= South Korea national under-17 football team =

Korea Republic U-17
- Nickname(s): Taegeuk Warriors; The Red Devils; The Reds
- Association: Korea Football Association (KFA)
- Confederation: AFC (Asia)
- Sub-confederation: EAFF (East Asia)
- Head coach: Back Gee-tae
- FIFA code: KOR
First colours	Second colours

First international
- South Korea 1–0 Bahrain (Doha, Qatar; 15 September 1984)

Biggest win
- South Korea 23–0 Northern Mariana Islands (Qingdao, China; 3 September 2023)

Biggest defeat
- South Korea 1–6 Saudi Arabia (Bangkok, Thailand; 7 November 1988); South Korea 1–6 United States (Lahti, Finland; 14 August 2003)

FIFA U-17 World Cup
- Appearances: 8 (first in 1987)
- Best result: Quarter-finals (1987, 2009, 2019)

AFC U-17 Asian Cup
- Appearances: 15 (first in 1986)
- Best result: Champions (1986, 2002)

The South Korea national under-17 football team (Korean: 대한민국 17세 이하 축구 국가대표팀; recognized as Korea Republic by FIFA) represents South Korea in international under-17 football competitions, and also can be managed as under-15 or under-16 team if necessary.

== Recent results and fixtures ==
The following is a list of match results in the last 12 months, as well as any future matches that have been scheduled.

Win Draw Loss Fixture

=== 2025 ===
20 December 2025 EAFF U-15 Championship	South Korea	1–1	China	Zhangzhou, China
15:00 UTC+8	Choi Junhyeok 43'	Report	Pan Chaowei 27' (pen.)	Stadium: Hooray International Football Training Base Stadium; Referee: Zhang Yihao (China)

22 December 2025 EAFF U-15 Championship	Japan	0–3	South Korea	Zhangzhou, China
10:10 UTC+8		Report	Myong Seong-jun 21', 55'; Jung Woo-jin 47'	Stadium: Hooray International Football Training Base A-05 Pitch; Referee: Bai Qitao (China)

=== 2026 ===
6 May 2026 AFC U-17 Asian Cup (Group C)	South Korea	1–1	United Arab Emirates	Jeddah, Saudi Arabia
20:30	Ahn Joo-wan 88'	Report	Al-Jneibi 8'	Stadium: King Abdullah Sports City Training Stadium (Pitch B); Attendance: 100; Referee: Adam Kersey (Australia)

10 May 2026 AFC U-17 Asian Cup (Group C)	Vietnam	1–4	South Korea	Jeddah, Saudi Arabia
19:00	Lê Sỹ Bách 33'	Report	An Sun-hyun 84'; Ian Nam 86'; Ahn Joo-wan 88'; Kim Ji-woo 90+4'	Stadium: King Abdullah Sports City Training Stadium (Pitch C); Attendance: 100; Referee: Du Jianxin (China)

13 May 2026 AFC U-17 Asian Cup (Group C)	South Korea	0–0	Yemen	Jeddah, Saudi Arabia
20:00		Report		Stadium: King Abdullah Sports City Training Stadium (Pitch B); Attendance: 252; Referee: Saud Al-Samhan (Kuwait)

16 May 2026 AFC U-17 Asian Cup (Quarter-finals)	Uzbekistan	2–2 (5–3 p)	South Korea	Jeddah, Saudi Arabia
19:00	Ravshanbekov 41', 45+2'	Report	Moon Ji-hwan 22'; An Sun-hyun 88'	Stadium: King Abdullah Sports City Training Stadium (Pitch C); Attendance: 81; Referee: Du Jianxin (China)
	Penalties
	Khakimov (penalty scored); Anvarov (penalty scored); Abdusoliev (penalty scored); Mamatov (penalty scored); Erkinov (penalty scored)		(penalty scored) Jung Ha-won; (penalty scored) Kim Ji-ho; (penalty scored) Ahn Joo-wan; (penalty missed) Park Kyung-hoon

== All-time results ==
=== Matches ===
The following is a list of match results in major competitions held by world, continental and regional federations. The FIFA U-17 World Cup (FIFA U-17 World Championship at the time) increased playing time of each match from 80 to 90 minutes in 1995.

Win Draw Loss

Competition	Round	Team scorer(s)	Score	Opponent	Ref.
1985 AFC U-16 Championship	Qualification; Group 1A	Kim Jong-rok 66'	1–0	Bahrain	
1985 AFC U-16 Championship	Qualification; Group 1A	—	0–1	Iraq	
1985 AFC U-16 Championship	Qualification; Group 1A		1–5	Qatar	
1986 AFC U-16 Championship	Qualification; Group 8	Kim Ho-cheol 19'; Roh Sang-rae 69'	2–0	Philippines	
1986 AFC U-16 Championship	Qualification; Group 8	Kim In-wan 21', 61'	2–0	Japan	
1986 AFC U-16 Championship	Group B	Kim Ho-cheol 9', 50', 57'; Hwang Gyu-ryong 14'; Jung Kwang-seok 60' (pen.)	5–0	Burma	
1986 AFC U-16 Championship	Group B	—	0–0	Bahrain	
1986 AFC U-16 Championship	Group B	—	0–0	North Korea	
1986 AFC U-16 Championship	Semi-finals	Hwang Gyu-ryong 63'	1–0	Saudi Arabia	
1986 AFC U-16 Championship	Final	—	0–0 (a.e.t.) (5–4 p)	Qatar	
1987 FIFA U-16 World Championship	Group B	Shin Tae-yong 53'	1–1	Ivory Coast	
1987 FIFA U-16 World Championship	Group B	—	0–1	Ecuador	
1987 FIFA U-16 World Championship	Group B	Noh Jung-yoon 25'; Shin Tae-yong 50'; Lee Tae-hong 65'; Kim In-wan 72'	4–2	United States	
1987 FIFA U-16 World Championship	Quarter-finals	—	0–2	Italy	
1988 AFC U-16 Championship	Qualification; Group 5	Lee Won-seok (?)	2–2	Japan	
1988 AFC U-16 Championship	Qualification; Group 5	Lee Won-seok (?)	7–0	Hong Kong	
1988 AFC U-16 Championship	Qualification; Group 5	Han Sang-ryeol 9', 12'; Lee Won-seok (?)	10–0	Brunei	
1988 AFC U-16 Championship	Group A	Gwak Kyung-keun 20', 50' (pen.)	2–1	Thailand	
1988 AFC U-16 Championship	Group A	—	0–1	Bahrain	
1988 AFC U-16 Championship	Group A	Yoon Jang-jin 70'	1–6	Saudi Arabia	
1988 AFC U-16 Championship	Group A	Gwak Kyung-keun (?); Yoon Jang-jin (?)	7–1	Indonesia	
1990 AFC U-16 Championship	Qualification; Group 5		1–0	Thailand	
1990 AFC U-16 Championship	Qualification; Group 5	Lee Dong-ryeol 50'; Lee Heung-woo 60'	2–0	Malaysia	
1990 AFC U-16 Championship	Qualification; Group 5		2–2	Bangladesh	
1990 AFC U-16 Championship	Group B		1–1	Indonesia	
1990 AFC U-16 Championship	Group B	—	0–3	Qatar	
1992 AFC U-16 Championship	Qualification; Group 5	Kim Hyeong-gu 45'	1–1	Japan	
1992 AFC U-16 Championship	Qualification; Group 5	Park Jong-pil 45'	1–2	North Korea	
1992 AFC U-16 Championship	Qualification; Group 5	—	0–4	China	
1994 AFC U-16 Championship	Qualification; Group 6	Kim Hyeon-jae (?); Na Hee-geun (?)	11–0	Guam	
1994 AFC U-16 Championship	Qualification; Group 6		2–2	Japan	
1994 AFC U-16 Championship	Group B	Kim Hyeon-jae 23'	1–0	Iraq	
1994 AFC U-16 Championship	Group B	—	0–2	Bahrain	
1994 AFC U-16 Championship	Group B	—	0–3	Japan	
1994 AFC U-16 Championship	Group B		1–1	United Arab Emirates	
1996 AFC U-16 Championship	Qualification; Group 8	Seo Kwan-soo 3'; Han Jeong-hwan 10', 68'; Kim Gyeong-il 20'; Lee Tae-gwon 21', 23', 54', 71'; Joo Won-gwan 46'; Yoon Hyeon 50'; Lee Eung-je 80'	11–1	Chinese Taipei	
1996 AFC U-16 Championship	Qualification; Group 8	Seo Kwan-soo 79' (pen.)	1–0	Laos	
1996 AFC U-16 Championship	Qualification; Group 8	Seo Kwan-soo (?)	3–1	Indonesia	
1996 AFC U-16 Championship	Group A	Park Young-deok 30', 75'; Jang Sang-hwa 55'	3–1	Kuwait	
1996 AFC U-16 Championship	Group A		2–3	Japan	
1996 AFC U-16 Championship	Group A		1–3	Oman	
1996 AFC U-16 Championship	Group A		1–1	Uzbekistan	
1998 AFC U-16 Championship	Qualification; Group 7	Lee Jeong-gyu 9'; Han Jung-hwa 16', 32'; Kim Tae-young 18'; Ju Kwang-youn 30', 71'	6–0	Chinese Taipei	
1998 AFC U-16 Championship	Qualification; Group 7	—	0–0 (5–4 p)	China	
1998 AFC U-16 Championship	Group B	Han Jung-hwa 47', 72'	2–1	Japan	
1998 AFC U-16 Championship	Group B	Choi Sung-kuk 72'	1–0	Oman	
1998 AFC U-16 Championship	Group B	Kim Dong-jin 15', 80'	2–1	Bangladesh	
1998 AFC U-16 Championship	Group B	Han Jung-hwa 12'; Ju Kwang-youn 49', 52'	3–4	Bahrain	
1998 AFC U-16 Championship	Semi-finals	Choi Sung-kuk 49'	1–2	Qatar	
1998 AFC U-16 Championship	Third place match	Ju Kwang-youn 13'	1–5	Bahrain	
2000 AFC U-16 Championship	Qualification; Group 7	Jung Yoon-sung 9 goals Lee Jin-ho 13'; Namkung Woong 19'; Han Seung-hyeon 25'; Han Jae-woong 26'; Jung Jo-gook 45'; Kwon Jip 83'	15–0	Brunei	
2000 AFC U-16 Championship	Qualification; Group 7	Lee Jin-ho 1', 4', 24', 78'; Namkung Woong 5', 62'; Han Jae-woong 17'; Kwon Jip 48', 67'; Jung Jo-gook 69', 72'; Jeong Byeong-min 70'; Park Ju-sung 74'	13–0	Mongolia	
2000 AFC U-16 Championship	Qualification; Group 7	Jung Yoon-sung 54'; Lee Ho 76'	2–2	China	
2002 AFC U-17 Championship	Qualification; Group 8	Kim Jun (?); An Sang-hyun (?); Lee Hun (?); Han Dong-won 6 goals Hong Hyeong-gi (?)	11–1	Laos	
2002 AFC U-17 Championship	Qualification; Group 8	Lee Sang-hup (?); Kim Jun (?); Kwon Soon-hyung (?); Yang Dong-hyen (?); Han Dong-won (?)	8–0	Philippines	
2002 AFC U-17 Championship	Qualification; Group 8	Lee Gang-jin (?); Kim Jun (?); An Sang-hyun (?); Yang Dong-hyen (?); Han Dong-won (?)	6–0	Cambodia	
2002 AFC U-17 Championship	Group B	Kim Jeong-hoon 20' ? 27' (o.g.); Park Tae-min 83'	3–0	Pakistan	
2002 AFC U-17 Championship	Group B	Lee Gang-jin 9' (pen.); Lee Yong-rae 51'	2–2	Yemen	
2002 AFC U-17 Championship	Group B	Lee Hun 6'; An Sang-hyun 23', 90'; Lee Sang-yong 25'	4–1	Vietnam	
2002 AFC U-17 Championship	Quarter-finals	Shin Young-cheol 49'; Choi Woo-seok 61', 67'	3–1	India	
2002 AFC U-17 Championship	Semi-finals	Yang Dong-hyen 12', 66'; Lee Hun 29'; Baek Seung-min 71'	4–0	Uzbekistan	
2002 AFC U-17 Championship	Final	Yang Dong-hyen 65'	1–1 (a.e.t.) (5–3 p)	Yemen	
2003 FIFA U-17 World Championship	Group D	Owens 11' (o.g.)	1–6	United States	
2003 FIFA U-17 World Championship	Group D	Yang Dong-hyen 45'; Sánchez 59' (o.g.)	2–3	Spain	
2003 FIFA U-17 World Championship	Group D	Han Dong-won 28'; Yang Dong-hyen 74'; Lee Yong-rae 78'	3–2	Sierra Leone	
2004 AFC U-17 Championship	Qualification; Group 13	Lee Chung-yong 5', 40', 90'; Koh Myong-jin 13', 67', 80'; Kang Seok-gu 30', 41'; Choo Sang-cheol 42', 47'	10–0	Hong Kong	
2004 AFC U-17 Championship	Qualification; Group 13	Ho Seung-wook 8', 23', 34', 52'; Bae Hae-min 9', 28'; Park Jung-hoon 19', 43'; Koh Myong-jin 25'; Yoo Yong-jae 35', 37'; Lee Hyun-woong 39'; Jo Yoon-jin 54', 62', 86'; Choi Gyeong-bok 55'; Lim Seong-taek 72', 91'	18–0	Guam	
2004 AFC U-17 Championship	Group B	Choi Kyung-bok 3'; Lee Chung-yong 48', 77'	3–0	Oman	
2004 AFC U-17 Championship	Group B	Lee Chung-yong 31'; Koh Myong-jin 57', 65'; Lim Se-hean 62'; Park Jung-hoon 75', 78'; Lim Seong-taek 85', 88'	8–0	Laos	
2004 AFC U-17 Championship	Group B	Koh Myong-jin 71'	1–0	Vietnam	
2004 AFC U-17 Championship	Quarter-finals	—	0–1	North Korea	
2006 AFC U-17 Championship	Qualification; Group L	Joo Sung-hwan 11', 12', 13', 30'; Lee Jae-beom 21'; Lim Jong-eun 25'; Yoon Bit-garam 32'; Kim Jung-hyun 39' ? 67' (o.g.); Bae Chun-suk 74', 86', 90'; Jeon Myeong-geun 81'; Koo Ja-myeong 88'	14–0	Macau	
2006 AFC U-17 Championship	Qualification; Group L	Kim Jung-hyun 16' (pen.)	1–1	Japan	
2006 AFC U-17 Championship	Qualification; Play-off	Kim Jung-hyun 90'	1–0	Thailand	
2006 AFC U-17 Championship	Group A	Choi Jin-soo 35'; Kim Jung-hyun 66'; Gu Ja-myeong 88'	3–1	Singapore	
2006 AFC U-17 Championship	Group A	Seol Jae-moon 45'; Joo Sung-hwan 81'	2–0	Nepal	
2006 AFC U-17 Championship	Group A	Joo Sung-hwan 59', 74'	2–3	Japan	
2006 AFC U-17 Championship	Quarter-finals	—	0–1	Tajikistan	
2007 FIFA U-17 World Cup	Group A	—	0–1	Peru	
2007 FIFA U-17 World Cup	Group A	—	0–2	Costa Rica	
2007 FIFA U-17 World Cup	Group A	Seol Jae-moon 45+1'; Yoon Bit-garam 80'	2–1	Togo	
2008 AFC U-16 Championship	Qualification; Group H	Rim Chang-woo 31'; Lim Dong-cheon 32', 50'; Lee Gang 43', 49', 74'; Lee Seung-min 62'; Cho Min-woo 68'; Kim Dong-min 72'; Lee Jong-ho 85'; Tien Chih-yuan 90' (o.g.)	11–0	Chinese Taipei	
2008 AFC U-16 Championship	Qualification; Group H	Lee Dong-nyeok 53'; Lee Gang 70'; Lee Jong-ho 76'; Lee Seung-min 87'	4–1	Thailand	
2008 AFC U-16 Championship	Qualification; Group H	Lee Gang 18', 43', 55', 69'; Lee Jong-ho 19', 21', 87'; Kim Jin-su 49', 62'; Lee Seung-min 71'; Nam Seung-woo 86'; Joo Ik-seong 90+1'	12–0	Chinese Taipei	
2008 AFC U-16 Championship	Qualification; Group H	Jeong Dong-cheol 55'	1–4	Thailand	
2008 AFC U-16 Championship	Group B	Kim Dong-jin 3'; Lee Gang 49', 61'; Rim Chang-woo 52'; Son Heung-min 72'	5–2	India	
2008 AFC U-16 Championship	Group B	Lee Dong-nyeok 2'; Kim Jin-su 5'; Rim Chang-woo 15'; Lee Jong-ho 29', 80', 90+1'; Son Heung-min 65', 75'; Kim Dong-min 86'	9–0	Indonesia	
2008 AFC U-16 Championship	Group B	Rim Chang-woo 80'	1–1	Syria	
2008 AFC U-16 Championship	Quarter-finals	Kim Dong-jin 12'; Son Heung-min 54'; Lee Gang 72'	3–0	Uzbekistan	
2008 AFC U-16 Championship	Semi-finals	Kim Dong-jin 4'; Lee Dong-nyeok 26'	2–1	Japan	
2008 AFC U-16 Championship	Final	Lee Gang 90+3'	1–2	Iran	
2009 FIFA U-17 World Cup	Group F	Nam Seung-woo 13'; Son Heung-min 62'; Lee Jong-ho 90'	3–1	Uruguay	
2009 FIFA U-17 World Cup	Group F	Kim Jin-su 30' (pen.)	1–2	Italy	
2009 FIFA U-17 World Cup	Group F	Lee Jong-ho 12'; Son Heung-min 22'	2–0	Algeria	
2009 FIFA U-17 World Cup	Round of 16	Kim Dong-jin 90+2'	1–1 (a.e.t.) (5–3 p)	Mexico	
2009 FIFA U-17 World Cup	Quarter-finals	Son Heung-min 40'	1–3	Nigeria	
2010 AFC U-16 Championship	Qualification; Group G	—	0–0	Myanmar	
2010 AFC U-16 Championship	Qualification; Group G	Hwang Sin-young 18', 45+2', 47'; Bang Chan-jun 24'; Park Jung-bin 34', 45'; Kwon Chang-hoon 43'; Kang Tae-woong 46', 83'; Rotha 57' (o.g.); Oh Jun-hyeok 77'	11–0	Cambodia	
2010 AFC U-16 Championship	Qualification; Group G	Park Jung-bin 13'	1–2	North Korea	
2010 AFC U-16 Championship	Qualification; Group G	Hwang Sin-young 19'; Jeong Ho-gyun 78'; Kang Tae-woong 80'	3–3	Vietnam	
2010 AFC U-16 Championship	Qualification; Group G	Kim Seung-jun 6'; Kwon Chang-hoon 82'	2–2	Thailand	
2012 AFC U-16 Championship	Qualification; Group F	Hwang Hee-chan 27'	1–1	Vietnam	
2012 AFC U-16 Championship	Qualification; Group F	Hwang Hee-chan 20'; Lee Geon 43', 90+4'; Yoo Won-jong 81'	4–2	Japan	
2012 AFC U-16 Championship	Qualification; Group F	Hwang Ki-wook 8' (pen.); Seo Jeong-deok 10', 14'; Roh Kyoung-woo 19', 62' (pen.), 76'; Tsai Shuo-che 42' (o.g.); Yoo Cheong-in 66'	8–0	Chinese Taipei	
2012 AFC U-16 Championship	Qualification; Group F	—	0–0	Laos	
2012 AFC U-16 Championship	Qualification; Group F	Seukirin 1' (o.g.); Lee Geon 14', 34', 74', 87'; Choi Ju-yong 16'; Hwang Ki-wook 21'; Yoo Jin-seok 70'; Ko Min-hyuk 84'; Roh Kyoung-woo 90'	10–0	Cambodia	
2012 AFC U-16 Championship	Group C	Hwang Hee-chan 18', 58', 67'	3–0	North Korea	
2012 AFC U-16 Championship	Group C	Hwang Hee-chan 13'; Choi Ju-yong 42'; Ko Min-hyuk 89'	3–1	Japan	
2012 AFC U-16 Championship	Group C	Jeong Hoon-woo 62'	1–0	Saudi Arabia	
2012 AFC U-16 Championship	Quarter-finals	Hwang Hee-chan 90+4'	1–1 (a.e.t.) (3–5 p)	Uzbekistan	
2014 AFC U-16 Championship	Qualification; Group H	Jo Sang-hyeon 3', 66', 90+2'; Park Myeong-su 11'; Lee Sang-heon 24'; Lee Yeon-gyu 33', 49', 85'; Kang Sang-hee 37', 45'; Lee Yong-eon 40'; You Ju-an 54'; Kim Ho 81'	13–0	Guam	
2014 AFC U-16 Championship	Qualification; Group H	Yook Geun-hyeok 8', 77', 89'; Lee Hyeong-gyeong 26', 43', 90+1'; You Ju-an 37'; Park Dae-won 50'; Jang Gyeol-hee 73'	9–0	Brunei	
2014 AFC U-16 Championship	Qualification; Group H	—	0–2	Malaysia	
2014 AFC U-16 Championship	Qualification; Group H	Lee Seung-woo 2', 18', 34', 75'	4–1	Laos	
2014 AFC U-16 Championship	Group A	Kim Jung-min 22'; Yoo Seung-min 86'; You Ju-an 90'	3–1	Oman	
2014 AFC U-16 Championship	Group A	Lee Seung-woo 15'	1–0	Malaysia	
2014 AFC U-16 Championship	Group A	Lee Seung-woo 45+1'; Hwang Tae-hyeon 62'	2–0	Thailand	
2014 AFC U-16 Championship	Quarter-finals	Lee Seung-woo 42', 47'	2–0	Japan	
2014 AFC U-16 Championship	Semi-finals	Jang Gyeol-hee 6', 49'; Lee Seung-woo 47' (pen.); Jang Jae-won 52'; Park Sang-hyeok 57'; Lee Sang-heon 60'; Lee Sang-min 62'	7–1	Syria	
2014 AFC U-16 Championship	Final	Choi Jae-young 34'	1–2	North Korea	
2014 Summer Youth Olympics	Group C	Kim Gyu-hyeong 4'; Jeong Woo-yeong 23' (pen.); Joo Hwi-min 36', 69'; Kim Seong-jun 59'	5–0	Cape Verde	
2014 Summer Youth Olympics	Group C	Jeong Woo-yeong 10'; Kim Gyu-hyeong 14', 26', 31', 59'; Rarua 53' (o.g.); Lee Ji-yong 62', 68', 80+1'	9–0	Vanuatu	
2014 Summer Youth Olympics	Semi-finals	Joo Hwi-min 63'	1–1 (3–1 p)	Iceland	
2014 Summer Youth Olympics	Final	Jeong Woo-yeong 16'	1–2	Peru	
2015 FIFA U-17 World Cup	Group B	Jang Jae-won 79'	1–0	Brazil	
2015 FIFA U-17 World Cup	Group B	Oh Se-hun 90+2'	1–0	Guinea	
2015 FIFA U-17 World Cup	Group B	—	0–0	England	
2015 FIFA U-17 World Cup	Round of 16	—	0–2	Belgium	
2016 AFC U-16 Championship	Qualification; Group I	Park Jeong-in 6 goals Ko Jun-hee 10', 82'; Lee Dong-ryul 31', 58', 67'; Shin Sang-whi 36', 41', 70', 75'; Son Jae-hyeok 62'; Yu Je-ho 64'	17–0	Macau	
2016 AFC U-16 Championship	Qualification; Group I	Cheon Seong-hoon 19'; Kim Dong-bum 29', 90+2'; Yong Dong-hyun 37'; Park Chan-bin 63', 70'	6–0	Chinese Taipei	
2016 AFC U-16 Championship	Qualification; Group I	Lee Dong-ryul 9'; Yong Dong-hyun 15'; Kim Tae-hwan 51'; Shin Sang-whi 56'	4–0	China	
2016 AFC U-16 Championship	Group C	Jeong Chan-young 43'	1–2	Iraq	
2016 AFC U-16 Championship	Group C	—	0–0	Oman	
2016 AFC U-16 Championship	Group C	Park Jeong-in 4'; Cheon Seong-hoon 14' (pen.); Ko Jun-hee 84'	3–0	Malaysia	
2018 AFC U-16 Championship	Qualification; Group H	Kim Dong-hyeon 11'; Lee Tae-seok 27'; Paik Sang-hoon 65'; Park Se-jun 67', 74'; Jeong Sang-bin 73', 85', 89'	8–0	Philippines	
2018 AFC U-16 Championship	Qualification; Group H	Yoon Suk-ju 16'; Lee Jun-seok 39'; Jeong Sang-bin 57'; Hong Yun-sang 82' (pen.)	4–0	Myanmar	
2018 AFC U-16 Championship	Qualification; Group H	Choi Min-seo 61' (pen.)	1–0	China	
2018 AFC U-16 Championship	Group D	Choi Min-seo 43', 68'; Hong Yun-sang 51'	3–0	Australia	
2018 AFC U-16 Championship	Group D	Ahn Gi-hun 22', 35'; Kazimi 45' (o.g.); Paik Sang-hoon 46'; Jeong Sang-bin 59', 63'; Hong Yun-sang 67'	7–0	Afghanistan	
2018 AFC U-16 Championship	Group D	Moon Jun-ho 45', 48'	2–0	Iraq	
2018 AFC U-16 Championship	Quarter-finals	Jeong Sang-bin 68'	1–0	India	
2018 AFC U-16 Championship	Semi-finals	Yoon Suk-ju 39'	1–1 (6–7 p)	Tajikistan	
2018 EAFF U-15 Boys' Tournament	Group B	Sung Jin-young 38'	1–0	North Korea	
2018 EAFF U-15 Boys' Tournament	Group B	Lee Hyun-ju 4', 18', 31', 36'; Lee Ji-han 10', 32'; Lim Sung-heon 14', 40+1'; Lee Hyeon-u 28'; Hong Ji-woo 49'; Yoon Tae-yang 52'; Kang Seong-jin 59', 73', 80+1'; Seo Gyu-won 60'; Kim Jong-won 76'; Sung Jin-young 64', 78', 80', 80+3'	20–0	Macau	
2018 EAFF U-15 Boys' Tournament	Group B	Lee Hyeon-u 3'; Kang Seong-jin 6'; Sung Jin-young 26'; Kim Jong-won 30+1', 43'; Lee Hyun-ju 32', 60+2'; Lee Ji-han 34'; Pahl 41', 60+1' (o.g.); Seo Gyu-won 47', 57'; Ahn Ji-man 54'	13–0	Guam	
2018 EAFF U-15 Boys' Tournament	Group B	Sung Jin-young 11'; Lee Ji-han 28'; Lim Sung-heon 33'; Yoon Tae-yang 57'; Ha Geum-seong 60'	5–0	Hong Kong	
2018 EAFF U-15 Boys' Tournament	Group B	Kwak Yong-chan 17'; Ha Geum-seong 23'; Kang Seong-jin 39'	3–0	China	
2019 FIFA U-17 World Cup	Group C	Eom Ji-sung 26'; Choi Min-seo 41'	2–1	Haiti	
2019 FIFA U-17 World Cup	Group C	Jeong Sang-bin 89'	1–3	France	
2019 FIFA U-17 World Cup	Group C	Paik Sang-hoon 1'; Hong Sung-wook 30'	2–1	Chile	
2019 FIFA U-17 World Cup	Round of 16	Choi Min-seo 33'	1–0	Angola	
2019 FIFA U-17 World Cup	Quarter-finals	—	0–1	Mexico	
2020 AFC U-16 Championship	Qualification; Group K	Lee Gyu-dong 19', 20', 47'; Lee Dong-hyeon 45+1'; Kim Ji-soo 54'; Heo Dong-min 70'; Jang Ha-min 81', 90+2'; Kim Do-hyeon 88'; Kim Jin-yeop 90+1'	10–0	Chinese Taipei	
2020 AFC U-16 Championship	Qualification; Group K	Jang Ha-min 51' (pen.)	1–0	Myanmar	
2020 AFC U-16 Championship	Qualification; Group K	Jang Ha-min 12'; Lee Gyu-dong 35'	2–0	Thailand	
2020 AFC U-16 Championship	Group C	—	Cancelled	Uzbekistan	
2020 AFC U-16 Championship	Group C	—	Cancelled	India	
2020 AFC U-16 Championship	Group C	—	Cancelled	Australia	
2023 AFC U-17 Asian Cup	Qualification; Group J	Kang Min-woo 26'; Yoo Byeong-heon 75'	2–3	Uzbekistan	
2023 AFC U-17 Asian Cup	Qualification; Group J	Kang Ju-hyeok 14', 25', 33', 56', 87'; Hwang Ji-seong 18'; Yoo Byeong-heon 30'; Yoon Do-young 58'; Kim Beom-hwan 63' (pen.); Ko Jong-hyeon 90+3'	10–0	Brunei	
2023 AFC U-17 Asian Cup	Group B	Kim Myung-jun 12' (pen.), 46', 60'; Baek In-woo 20', 55'; Yoon Do-young 31'	6–1	Qatar	
2023 AFC U-17 Asian Cup	Group B	Lim Hyun-sub 13'; Noorzai 24' (o.g.); Yoon Do-young 34', 54'	4–0	Afghanistan	
2023 AFC U-17 Asian Cup	Group B	—	0–2	Iran	
2023 AFC U-17 Asian Cup	Quarter-finals	Kang Min-woo 4'; Kim Myung-jun 36'; Yoon Do-young 69'; Kim Hyeon-min 84'	4–1	Thailand	
2023 AFC U-17 Asian Cup	Semi-finals	Baek In-woo 31'	1–0	Uzbekistan	
2023 AFC U-17 Asian Cup	Final	—	0–3	Japan	
2023 EAFF U-15 Men's Championship	Group A	Kim Ye-geon 32' (pen.); Jang Yo-han 47', 56'; Battumur 50' (o.g.); Kim Se-bin 82'; Kang Min-jun 90+5'	6–0	Mongolia	
2023 EAFF U-15 Men's Championship	Group A	Kang Min-jun 2', 24', 44', 50', 71'; Jang Yo-han 6', 15', 42'; Park Jeong-ho 16', 18', 40'; Heo Hwan 20', 61'; Sim Woo-sol 23'; Kim Min-jun 25', 45'; Lee Gang-hyeon 57', 81', 88'; Kim Ye-geon 74', 83', 90+2'; Kim Seung-hyeon 76'	23–0	Northern Mariana Islands	
2023 EAFF U-15 Men's Championship	Group A	Kim Ye-geon 19', 45+3'; Kim Se-bin 23'; Oh Tae-gyeong 33'; Jang Yo-han 51'; Kim Min-jun 61'; Lee Sang-yeon 64'; Kang Min-jun 79'; Han Jun-hee 84'	9–0	Macau	
2023 EAFF U-15 Men's Championship	Group A	Jang Yo-han 34'	1–1	China	
2023 EAFF U-15 Men's Championship	Semi-finals	—	0–4	Japan	
2023 EAFF U-15 Men's Championship	Third place match	Lee Dong-geun 55'; Sung Chi-chan 73' (o.g.); Kim Ye-geon 86'; Jang Yo-han 90+1'	4–0	Chinese Taipei	
2023 FIFA U-17 World Cup	Group E	Kim Myung-jun 35'	1–3	United States	
2023 FIFA U-17 World Cup	Group E	—	0–1	France	
2023 FIFA U-17 World Cup	Group E	Kim Myung-jun 49'	1–2	Burkina Faso	
2025 AFC U-17 Asian Cup	Qualification; Group C	Lee Su-yoon 8'; Lee Sang-yeon 15' (pen.); Jeon Min-seung 21' (pen.), 67'; Oh Ha-ram 35'	5–0	Bhutan	
2025 AFC U-17 Asian Cup	Qualification; Group C	Jeon Min-seung 26'; Lee Ji-ho 28'; Kim Eun-seong 34'; Kim Ji-seong 35', 43', 67'; Kim Min-chan 48'; Lim Ye-chan 72', 84'; Lee Sang-yeon 82'; Park Byeong-chan 87', 90+1', 90+5'	13–0	Maldives	
2025 AFC U-17 Asian Cup	Qualification; Group C	Lee Su-yoon 37' (pen.); Lee Ji-ho 64'	2–0	Bahrain	
2025 AFC U-17 Asian Cup	Qualification; Group C	Jeon Min-seung 8'; Lee Ji-ho 87' (pen.)	2–2	China	
2025 AFC U-17 Asian Cup	Group C	—	0–1	Indonesia	
2025 AFC U-17 Asian Cup	Group C	Jeong Hee-jeong 3'; Kim Ye-geon 9' (pen.); Kim Eun-seong 17', 70'; Oh Ha-ram 51'; Park Byeong-chan 66'	6–0	Afghanistan	
2025 AFC U-17 Asian Cup	Group C	Kim Eun-seong 29'	1–0	Yemen	
2025 AFC U-17 Asian Cup	Quarter-finals	Jeong Hyeon-ung 67'; Kim Ji-seong 90+9' (pen.)	2–2 (5–3 p)	Tajikistan	
2025 AFC U-17 Asian Cup	Semi-finals	Oh Ha-ram 45'	1–1 (1–3 p)	Saudi Arabia	
2025 FIFA U-17 World Cup	Group F	Koo Hyeon-bin 19'; Nam I-an 49'	2–1	Mexico	
2025 FIFA U-17 World Cup	Group F	—	0–0	Switzerland	
2025 FIFA U-17 World Cup	Group F	Kim Ji-sung 26'; Jeong Hyeon-ung 48'; Lee Yong-hyeon 87' (pen.)	3–1	Ivory Coast	
2025 FIFA U-17 World Cup	Round of 32	—	0–2	England	
2025 EAFF U-15 Championship	—	—	0–2	Hong Kong	
2025 EAFF U-15 Championship	—	Choi Jun-hyeok 43'	1–1	China	
2025 EAFF U-15 Championship	—	Myong Seong-jun 21'; Jung Woo-jin 47', 55'	3–0	Japan	
2026 AFC U-17 Asian Cup	Group C	Ahn Joo-wan 88'	1–1	United Arab Emirates	
2026 AFC U-17 Asian Cup	Group C	An Sun-hyun 84'; Ian Nam 86'; Ahn Joo-wan 88'; Kim Ji-woo 90+4'	4–1	Vietnam	
2026 AFC U-17 Asian Cup	Group C	—	0–0	Yemen	
2026 AFC U-17 Asian Cup	Quarter-finals	Moon Ji-hwan 22'; An Sun-hyun 88'	2–2 (3–5 p)	Uzbekistan	

=== Results by competition ===
As of 16 May 2026 (after the 2026 AFC U-17 Asian Cup)

Competition	Pld	W	D	L	GF	GA	GD	Win %
FIFA U-17 World Cup	31	12	4	15	36	46	−10	38.71
AFC U-17 Asian Cup	78	42	17	19	167	81	+86	53.85
AFC U-17 Asian Cup qualification	65	44	13	8	346	48	+298	67.69
Summer Youth Olympics	4	2	1	1	16	3	+13	50.00
EAFF U-15 Men's Championship	14	10	2	2	89	8	+81	71.43
Total	192	110	37	45	654	186	+468	57.29

== Coaching staff ==
Position	Coach
Manager	(South Korea) Back Gee-tae

== Players ==
=== Current squad ===
The following players were called up for the 2025 AFC U-17 Asian Cup between 3 and 20 April 2025.

Caps and goals are correct as of 7 April 2025, after the match against Afghanistan.

No.	Pos.	Player	Date of birth (age)	Caps	Goals	Club
1	GK	Park Do-hun	8 April 2008 (age 18)	2	0	(Korea Football Association) Daegu
12	GK	Heo Jae-won	21 May 2008 (age 18)	3	0	(Korea Football Association) Jeju
21	GK	Choi Ju-ho	12 January 2008 (age 18)	2	0	(Korea Football Association) Ulsan HD
2	DF	Kim Min-chan	13 April 2008 (age 18)	5	0	(Korea Football Association) Ulsan HD
3	DF	Kim Do-yeon	21 February 2008 (age 18)	4	2	(Korea Football Association) Daejeon Hana Citizen
4	DF	Kim Chan-il	3 July 2008 (age 18)	3	0	(Korea Football Association) Seongnam
5	DF	So Yoon-woo	10 May 2008 (age 18)	4	0	(Korea Football Association) Chungnam Asan
15	DF	Jung Hui-seop	26 January 2008 (age 18)	1	0	(Korea Football Association) Jeonbuk Hyundai Motors
20	DF	Koo Hyeon-bin	9 December 2008 (age 17)	5	0	(Korea Football Association) Incheon United
22	DF	Ryu Hye-sung	20 February 2008 (age 18)	3	0	(Korea Football Association) Ulsan HD
6	MF	Lee Su-yoon	13 September 2008 (age 18)	3	0	(Korea Football Association) Seongnam
7	MF	Kim Ji-sung	12 February 2008 (age 18)	2	0	(Korea Football Association) Suwon Samsung Bluewings
8	MF	Park Byung-chan	21 October 2008 (age 18)	5	2	(Korea Football Association) Daejeon Hana Citizen
10	MF	Kim Ye-geon	7 August 2008 (age 18)	5	2	(Football Association of Serbia) Red Star Belgrade
23	MF	Jin Geon-young	11 April 2008 (age 18)	5	0	(Korea Football Association) Cheonan Jeil High School
9	FW	Jung Hee-jung	17 September 2008 (age 18)	5	2	(Korea Football Association) Treasure Island Namhae
11	FW	Jang Woo-sik	10 January 2008 (age 18)	3	1	(Korea Football Association) Bucheon
13	FW	Lim Ye-chan	29 February 2008 (age 18)	5	0	(Korea Football Association) Incheon United
14	FW	Kim Ji-hyuk	17 February 2008 (age 18)	3	0	(Korea Football Association) Seongnam
16	FW	Oh Ha-ram	12 January 2008 (age 18)	5	2	(Korea Football Association) Jeonnam Dragons
17	FW	Jeong Hyun-woong	16 February 2008 (age 18)	5	3	(Korea Football Association) Seoul
18	FW	Park Seo-jun	30 April 2008 (age 18)	3	1	(Korea Football Association) Daejeon Hana Citizen
19	FW	Kim Eun-seong	17 March 2008 (age 18)	4	2	(Korea Football Association) Daedong Taxation High School

== Competitive record ==
Champions Runners-up Third place Tournament played on home soil

=== FIFA U-17 World Cup ===
FIFA U-17 World Cup record
Year	Round	Pld	W	D	L	GF	GA	Squad
(China) 1985	Did not qualify							
(Canada) 1987	Quarter-finals	4	1	1	2	5	6	Squad
(Scotland) 1989	Did not qualify							
(Italy) 1991	Did not qualify							
(Japan) 1993	Did not qualify							
(Ecuador) 1995	Did not qualify							
(Egypt) 1997	Did not qualify							
(New Zealand) 1999	Did not qualify							
(Trinidad and Tobago) 2001	Did not qualify							
(Finland) 2003	Group stage	3	1	0	2	6	11	Squad
(Peru) 2005	Did not qualify							
(South Korea) 2007	Group stage	3	1	0	2	2	4	Squad
(Nigeria) 2009	Quarter-finals	5	2	1	2	8	7	Squad
(Mexico) 2011	Did not qualify							
(United Arab Emirates) 2013	Did not qualify							
(Chile) 2015	Round of 16	4	2	1	1	2	2	Squad
(India) 2017	Did not qualify							
(Brazil) 2019	Quarter-finals	5	3	0	2	6	6	Squad
(Indonesia) 2023	Group stage	3	0	0	3	2	6	Squad
(Qatar) 2025	Round of 32	4	2	1	1	5	4	Squad
(Qatar) 2026	In progress	1	1	0	0	3	0	Squad
(Qatar) 2027	To be determined							
(Qatar) 2028	To be determined							
(Qatar) 2029	To be determined							
Total	Quarter-finals	32	13	4	15	39	46	9/21

=== AFC U-17 Asian Cup ===
AFC U-17 Asian Cup record								Qualification record					
Year	Round	Pld	W	D	L	GF	GA	Pld	W	D	L	GF	GA
(Qatar) 1985	Did not qualify							3	1	0	2	2	6
(Qatar) 1986	Champions	5	2	3	0	6	0	2	2	0	0	4	0
(Thailand) 1988	Group stage	4	2	0	2	10	9	3	2	1	0	19	2
(United Arab Emirates) 1990	Group stage	2	0	1	1	1	4	3	2	1	0	5	2
(Saudi Arabia) 1992	Did not qualify							3	0	1	2	2	7
(Qatar) 1994	Group stage	4	1	1	2	2	6	2	1	1	0	13	2
(Thailand) 1996	Group stage	4	1	1	2	7	8	3	3	0	0	15	2
(Qatar) 1998	Fourth place	6	3	0	3	10	13	2	1	1	0	6	0
(Vietnam) 2000	Did not qualify							3	2	1	0	30	2
(United Arab Emirates) 2002	Champions	6	4	2	0	17	5	3	3	0	0	25	1
(Japan) 2004	Quarter-finals	4	3	0	1	12	1	2	2	0	0	28	0
(Singapore) 2006	Quarter-finals	4	2	0	2	7	5	3	2	1	0	16	1
(Uzbekistan) 2008	Runners-up	6	4	1	1	21	6	4	3	0	1	28	5
(Uzbekistan) 2010	Did not qualify							5	1	3	1	17	7
(Iran) 2012	Quarter-finals	4	3	1	0	8	2	5	3	2	0	23	3
(Thailand) 2014	Runners-up	6	5	0	1	16	4	4	3	0	1	26	3
(India) 2016	Group stage	3	1	1	1	4	2	3	3	0	0	27	0
(Malaysia) 2018	Semi-finals	5	4	1	0	14	1	3	3	0	0	13	0
(Bahrain) ~~2020~~	Cancelled							3	3	0	0	13	0
(Thailand) 2023	Runners-up	6	4	0	2	15	7	2	1	0	1	12	3
(Saudi Arabia) 2025	Semi-finals	5	2	2	1	10	4	4	3	1	0	22	2
(Saudi Arabia) 2026	Quarter-finals	4	1	3	0	7	4	Directly qualified					
(Uzbekistan) 2027	Qualified							Directly qualified					
Total	2 titles	78	42	17	19	167	81	65	44	13	8	346	48

=== Other competitions ===
Competition	Round	Pld	W	D	L	GF	GA
(China) 2014 Summer Youth Olympics	Silver medalists	4	2	1	1	16	3
(China) 2018 EAFF U-15 Boys' Tournament	—	5	5	0	0	42	0
(China) 2023 EAFF U-15 Men's Championship	Third place	6	4	1	1	43	5
(China) 2025 EAFF U-15 Championship	Runners-up	3	1	1	1	4	3

== Head-to-head record ==
The following table shows South Korea's head-to-head record at the FIFA U-17 World Cup, AFC U-17 Asian Cup, Summer Youth Olympics and EAFF U-15 Men's Championship, excluding minor competitions and friendlies, as of 16 May 2026 (after the 2026 AFC U-17 Asian Cup).

Opponent	Pld	W	D	L	GF	GA	GD	Win %
Afghanistan	3	3	0	0	17	0	+17	100.00
Algeria	1	1	0	0	2	0	+2	100.00
Angola	1	1	0	0	1	0	+1	100.00
Australia	1	1	0	0	3	0	+3	100.00
Bahrain	7	2	1	4	7	12	−5	28.57
Bangladesh	2	1	1	0	4	3	+1	50.00
Belgium	1	0	0	1	0	2	−2	0.00
Bhutan	1	1	0	0	5	0	+5	100.00
Brazil	1	1	0	0	1	0	+1	100.00
Brunei	4	4	0	0	44	0	+44	100.00
Burkina Faso	1	0	0	1	1	2	−1	0.00
Cambodia	3	3	0	0	27	0	+27	100.00
Cape Verde	1	1	0	0	5	0	+5	100.00
Chile	1	1	0	0	2	1	+1	100.00
China	9	3	5	1	14	10	+4	33.33
Chinese Taipei	8	8	0	0	68	1	+67	100.00
Costa Rica	1	0	0	1	0	2	−2	0.00
Ecuador	1	0	0	1	0	1	−1	0.00
England	2	0	1	1	0	2	−2	0.00
France	2	0	0	2	1	4	−3	0.00
Guam	4	4	0	0	55	0	+55	100.00
Guinea	1	1	0	0	1	0	+1	100.00
Haiti	1	1	0	0	2	1	+1	100.00
Hong Kong	4	3	0	1	22	2	+20	75.00
Iceland	1	0	1	0	1	1	+0	0.00
India	3	3	0	0	9	3	+6	100.00
Indonesia	5	3	1	1	20	4	+16	60.00
Iran	2	0	0	2	1	4	−3	0.00
Iraq	4	2	0	2	4	3	+1	50.00
Italy	2	0	0	2	1	4	−3	0.00
Ivory Coast	2	1	1	0	4	2	+2	50.00
Japan	16	7	4	5	28	27	+1	43.75
Kuwait	1	1	0	0	3	1	+2	100.00
Laos	5	4	1	0	24	2	+22	80.00
Macau	4	4	0	0	60	0	+60	100.00
Malaysia	4	3	0	1	6	2	+4	75.00
Maldives	1	1	0	0	13	0	+13	100.00
Mexico	3	1	1	1	3	3	+0	33.33
Mongolia	2	2	0	0	19	0	+19	100.00
Myanmar (Note: Including Burma)	4	3	1	0	10	0	+10	75.00
Nepal	1	1	0	0	2	0	+2	100.00
Nigeria	1	0	0	1	1	3	−2	0.00
North Korea	7	2	1	4	7	7	+0	28.57
Northern Mariana Islands	1	1	0	0	23	0	+23	100.00
Oman	5	3	1	1	8	4	+4	60.00
Pakistan	1	1	0	0	3	0	+3	100.00
Peru	2	0	0	2	1	3	−2	0.00
Philippines	3	3	0	0	18	0	+18	100.00
Qatar	5	1	1	3	8	11	−3	20.00
Saudi Arabia	4	2	1	1	4	7	−3	50.00
Sierra Leone	1	1	0	0	3	2	+1	100.00
Singapore	1	1	0	0	3	1	+2	100.00
Spain	1	0	0	1	2	3	−1	0.00
Switzerland	1	0	1	0	0	0	+0	0.00
Syria	2	1	1	0	8	2	+6	50.00
Tajikistan	3	0	2	1	3	4	−1	0.00
Thailand	9	7	1	1	19	9	+10	77.78
Togo	1	1	0	0	2	1	+1	100.00
United Arab Emirates	2	0	2	0	2	2	+0	0.00
United States	3	1	0	2	6	11	−5	33.33
Uruguay	1	1	0	0	3	1	+2	100.00
Uzbekistan	7	3	3	1	14	7	+7	42.86
Vanuatu	1	1	0	0	9	0	+9	100.00
Vietnam	5	3	2	0	13	6	+7	60.00
Yemen	4	1	3	0	4	3	+1	25.00
Total	192	110	37	45	654	186	+468	57.29

== See also ==
- Football in South Korea
- Korea Football Association
- South Korea national football team
- South Korea national football B team
- South Korea national under-23 football team
- South Korea national under-20 football team
- South Korea women's national under-17 football team
