= 2006 AFC U-17 Championship qualification =

Qualification for the 2006 AFC U-17 Championship.

== West Asia (Zone 1) ==
=== Group A ===
Team	Pts	Pld	W	D	L	GF	GA	GD
Iraq	6	2	2	0	0	4	0	+4
Jordan (H)	3	2	1	0	1	2	1	+1
Palestine	0	2	0	0	2	0	5	–5

13 December 2005

Iraq	3 – 0	Palestine

Amman, Jordan

15 December 2005

Palestine	0 – 2	Jordan

Amman, Jordan

17 December 2005

Jordan	0 – 1	Iraq

Amman, Jordan

=== Group B ===
Team	Pts	Pld	W	D	L	GF	GA	GD
Yemen	6	2	2	0	0	6	3	+3
Qatar (H)	3	2	1	0	1	2	3	–1
Bahrain	0	2	0	0	2	4	6	–2

13 December 2005

Qatar	0 – 2	Yemen

Doha, Qatar

15 December 2005

Yemen	4 – 3	Bahrain

Doha, Qatar

17 December 2005

Bahrain	1 – 2	Qatar

Doha, Qatar

=== Group C ===
Team	Pts	Pld	W	D	L	GF	GA	GD
Saudi Arabia	6	2	2	0	0	8	1	+7
Oman (H)	3	2	1	0	1	5	5	0
Lebanon	0	2	0	0	2	2	9	–7

13 December 2005

Oman	5 – 1	Lebanon

Muscat, Oman

15 December 2005

Lebanon	1 – 4	Saudi Arabia

Muscat, Oman

17 December 2005

Saudi Arabia	4 – 0	Oman

Muscat, Oman

=== Group D ===
Team	Pts	Pld	W	D	L	GF	GA	GD
Syria (H)	4	2	1	1	0	2	0	+2
United Arab Emirates	3	2	1	0	1	2	2	0
Kuwait	1	2	0	1	1	0	2	–2

13 December 2005

Kuwait	0 – 0	Syria

Aleppo, Syria

15 December 2005

Syria	2 – 0	United Arab Emirates

Aleppo, Syria

17 December 2005

United Arab Emirates	2 – 0	Kuwait

Aleppo, Syria

== Central & South Asia (Zone 2) ==
=== Group E ===
Team	Pts	Pld	W	D	L	GF	GA	GD
Bangladesh	3	1	1	0	1	3	1	+2
Sri Lanka	3	1	1	0	1	1	3	–2

21 November 2005

Bangladesh	3 – 0	Sri Lanka

Bangabandhu National Stadium, Dhaka
25 November 2005

Sri Lanka	1 – 0	Bangladesh

Sri Lanka

=== Group F ===
Team	Pts	Pld	W	D	L	GF	GA	GD
Nepal (H)	6	2	2	0	0	4	1	+3
Uzbekistan	3	2	1	0	1	2	2	0
Kyrgyzstan	0	2	0	0	2	1	4	–3

13 November 2005

Uzbekistan	2 – 0	Kyrgyzstan

Kathmandu, Nepal

15 November 2005

Kyrgyzstan	1 – 2	Nepal

Kathmandu, Nepal

17 November 2005

Nepal	2 – 0	Uzbekistan

Kathmandu, Nepal

=== Group G ===
Team	Pts	Pld	W	D	L	GF	GA	GD
Tajikistan	6	2	2	0	0	4	2	+2
India (H)	3	2	1	0	1	11	3	+8
Pakistan	0	2	0	0	2	0	10	–10

13 November 2005

India	9 – 0	Pakistan

New Delhi, India

15 November 2005

Pakistan	0 – 1	Tajikistan

New Delhi, India

17 November 2005

Tajikistan	3 – 2	India

New Delhi, India

=== Group H ===
Team	Pts	Pld	W	D	L	GF	GA	GD
Iran	6	2	2	0	0	10	2	+8
Turkmenistan	0	2	0	0	0	2	10	–8

13 November 2005

Iran	5 – 0	Turkmenistan

Karaj, Iran

17 November 2005

Turkmenistan	2 – 5	Iran

Ashgabat, Turkmenistan

== Asean (Zone 3) ==
Singapore qualified as hosts.

=== Group I ===
Team	Pts	Pld	W	D	L	GF	GA	GD
Laos (H)	4	2	1	1	0	5	0	+5
Australia	4	2	1	1	0	3	1	+2
Indonesia	0	2	0	0	2	1	8	-7

February 7, 2006

Laos	0 – 0	Australia

Vientiane, Laos

February 9, 2006

Australia	3 – 1	Indonesia

Vientiane, Laos

February 11, 2006

Indonesia	0 – 5	Laos

Vientiane, Laos

Laos won the group, but was later disqualified for fielding over-aged players in a U-13 tournament in Qatar.

=== Group J ===
Team	Pts	Pld	W	D	L	GF	GA	GD
Myanmar	4	2	1	1	0	13	1	+12
Thailand (H)	4	2	1	1	0	11	1	+10
Maldives	0	2	0	0	2	0	22	–22

13 November 2005

Thailand	10 – 0	Maldives

Bangkok, Thailand

15 November 2005

Maldives	0 – 12	Myanmar

Bangkok, Thailand

17 November 2005

Myanmar	1 – 1	Thailand

Bangkok, Thailand

=== Group K ===
Team	Pts	Pld	W	D	L	GF	GA	GD
Vietnam	6	2	2	0	0	2	0	+2
Malaysia	0	2	0	0	2	0	2	–2

13 November 2005

Malaysia	0 – 1	Vietnam

Kuala Lumpur, Malaysia

17 November 2005

Vietnam	1 – 0	Malaysia

Hanoi, Vietnam

== East Asia (Zone 4) ==
=== Group L ===
Team	Pts	Pld	W	D	L	GF	GA	GD
Japan	4	2	1	1	0	27	1	+26
South Korea (H)	4	2	1	1	0	15	1	+14
Macau	0	2	0	0	2	0	40	–40

13 November 2005

South Korea	14 – 0	Macau

Paju, South Korea

15 November 2005

Macau	0 – 26	Japan

Paju, South Korea

17 November 2005

Japan	1 – 1	South Korea

Paju, South Korea

=== Group M ===
Team	Pts	Pld	W	D	L	GF	GA	GD
China (H)	6	2	2	0	0	20	0	+20
Chinese Taipei	3	2	1	0	1	2	10	–8
Mongolia	0	2	0	0	2	1	13	–12

13 November 2005

China	11 – 0	Mongolia

Weifang, PR China

15 November 2005

Mongolia	1 – 2	Chinese Taipei

Weifang, PR China

17 November 2005

Chinese Taipei	0 – 9	China

Weifang, PR China

=== Group N ===
Team	Pts	Pld	W	D	L	GF	GA	GD
North Korea (H)	6	2	2	0	0	21	0	+21
Hong Kong	1	2	0	1	1	2	6	–4
Guam	1	2	0	1	1	2	19	–17

14 November 2005

North Korea	17 – 0	Guam

Pyongyang, Korea DPR

16 November 2005

Guam	2 – 2	Hong Kong

Pyongyang, Korea DPR

18 November 2005

Hong Kong	0 – 4	North Korea

Pyongyang, Korea DPR

== Playoff Match ==
Play-off for the last spot at the finals (the best second-placed teams from ASEAN and East Asia)

15 February 2006

Thailand	0 – 1	South Korea
		Kim Jung-Hyun 90+3'

Kuala Lumpur, Malaysia
