= 2002 AFC U-17 Championship qualification =

Qualification for the 2002 AFC U-17 Championship.

== Group 1 ==
All matches were played in Sanaa, Yemen.

| Pos | Team | Pld | W | D | L | GF | GA | GD | Pts | Qualification |
|---|---|---|---|---|---|---|---|---|---|---|
| 1 | Yemen | 3 | 3 | 0 | 0 | 9 | 1 | +8 | 9 | Final tournament |
| 2 | Bahrain | 3 | 1 | 1 | 1 | 4 | 5 | −1 | 4 | |
| 3 | Kuwait | 3 | 1 | 1 | 1 | 4 | 6 | −2 | 4 | |
| 4 | Palestine | 3 | 0 | 0 | 3 | 3 | 8 | −5 | 0 | |

26 July 2002

| Yemen | 2–0 | Bahrain |

26 July 2002

| Palestine | 1–2 | Kuwait |

28 July 2002

| Bahrain | 1–1 | Kuwait |

28 July 2002

| Yemen | 3–0 | Palestine |

30 July 2002

| Bahrain | 3–2 | Palestine |

30 July 2002

| Yemen | 4–1 | Kuwait |

== Group 2 ==
| Pos | Team | Pld | W | D | L | GF | GA | GD | Pts | Qualification |
|---|---|---|---|---|---|---|---|---|---|---|
| 1 | Syria | 2 | 1 | 1 | 0 | 1 | 0 | +1 | 4 | Final tournament |
| 2 | Saudi Arabia | 2 | 0 | 1 | 1 | 0 | 1 | −1 | 1 | |
| – | Lebanon | withdrew | | | | | | | | |

26 July 2002

| Saudi Arabia | 0–0 | Syria |

Al-Ahsa, Saudi Arabia
31 July 2002

| Syria | 1–0 | Saudi Arabia |

Damascus, Syria

== Group 3 ==
All matches were played in Doha, Qatar.

| Pos | Team | Pld | W | D | L | GF | GA | GD | Pts | Qualification |
|---|---|---|---|---|---|---|---|---|---|---|
| 1 | Qatar | 2 | 2 | 0 | 0 | 5 | 1 | +4 | 6 | Final tournament |
| 2 | Jordan | 2 | 1 | 0 | 1 | 2 | 2 | 0 | 3 | |
| 3 | Iraq | 2 | 0 | 0 | 2 | 2 | 6 | −4 | 0 | |

26 July 2002

| Iraq | 1–2 | Jordan |

28 July 2002

| Qatar | 4–1 | Iraq |

31 July 2002

| Jordan | 0–1 | Qatar |

== Group 4 ==
Both matches were played in Chennai, India.

| Pos | Team | Pld | W | D | L | GF | GA | GD | Pts | Qualification |
|---|---|---|---|---|---|---|---|---|---|---|
| 1 | India | 2 | 2 | 0 | 0 | 12 | 0 | +12 | 6 | Final tournament |
| 2 | Maldives | 2 | 0 | 0 | 2 | 0 | 12 | –12 | 0 | |
| – | Bhutan | withdrew | | | | | | | | |

5 May 2002

| Maldives | 0–10 | India |

7 May 2002

| India | 2–0 | Maldives |

== Group 5 ==
All matches were played in Tashkent, Uzbekistan.

| Pos | Team | Pld | W | D | L | GF | GA | GD | Pts | Qualification |
|---|---|---|---|---|---|---|---|---|---|---|
| 1 | Uzbekistan | 2 | 2 | 0 | 0 | 10 | 2 | +8 | 6 | Final tournament |
| 2 | Kyrgyzstan | 2 | 0 | 1 | 1 | 3 | 7 | −4 | 1 | |
| 3 | Sri Lanka | 2 | 0 | 1 | 1 | 1 | 5 | −4 | 1 | |

6 May 2002

| Kyrgyzstan | 1–1 | Sri Lanka |

8 May 2002

| Uzbekistan | 4–0 | Sri Lanka |

10 May 2002

| Uzbekistan | 6–2 | Kyrgyzstan |

== Group 6 ==
All matches were played in Dushanbe, Tajikistan.

| Pos | Team | Pld | W | D | L | GF | GA | GD | Pts | Qualification |
|---|---|---|---|---|---|---|---|---|---|---|
| 1 | Tajikistan | 2 | 2 | 0 | 0 | 7 | 0 | +7 | 6 | Suspended and disqualified |
| 2 | Pakistan | 2 | 1 | 0 | 1 | 2 | 4 | −2 | 3 | Final tournament |
| 3 | Turkmenistan | 2 | 0 | 0 | 2 | 0 | 5 | −5 | 0 | |

13 May 2002

| Tajikistan | 3–0 | Turkmenistan |

15 May 2002

| Turkmenistan | 0–2 | Pakistan |

17 May 2002

| Pakistan | 0–4 | Tajikistan |

== Group 7 ==
All matches were played in Yangon, Myanmar.

| Pos | Team | Pld | W | D | L | GF | GA | GD | Pts | Qualification |
|---|---|---|---|---|---|---|---|---|---|---|
| 1 | Myanmar | 2 | 2 | 0 | 0 | 15 | 0 | +15 | 6 | Final tournament |
| 2 | Hong Kong | 2 | 1 | 0 | 1 | 3 | 9 | −6 | 3 | |
| 3 | Singapore | 2 | 0 | 0 | 2 | 0 | 9 | −9 | 0 | |

13 May 2002

| Myanmar | 9–0 | Hong Kong |

15 May 2002

| Hong Kong | 3–0 | Singapore |

17 May 2002

| Myanmar | 6–0 | Singapore |

== Group 8 ==
All matches were played in Seoul, South Korea.

| Pos | Team | Pld | W | D | L | GF | GA | GD | Pts | Qualification |
|---|---|---|---|---|---|---|---|---|---|---|
| 1 | South Korea | 3 | 3 | 0 | 0 | 25 | 1 | +24 | 9 | Final tournament |
| 2 | Laos | 3 | 2 | 0 | 1 | 9 | 12 | −3 | 6 | |
| 3 | Cambodia | 3 | 1 | 0 | 2 | 4 | 9 | −5 | 3 | |
| 4 | Philippines | 3 | 0 | 0 | 3 | 0 | 16 | −16 | 0 | |

15 April 2002

| Philippines | 0–3 | Cambodia |

15 April 2002

| South Korea | 11–1 | Laos |

17 April 2002

| Cambodia | 1–3 | Laos |

17 April 2002

| South Korea | 8–0 | Philippines |

19 April 2002

| Laos | 5–0 | Philippines |

19 April 2002

| South Korea | 6–0 | Cambodia |

== Group 9 ==
All matches were played in Pyongyang, North Korea.

| Pos | Team | Pld | W | D | L | GF | GA | GD | Pts | Qualification |
|---|---|---|---|---|---|---|---|---|---|---|
| 1 | China | 2 | 2 | 0 | 0 | 20 | 2 | +18 | 6 | Final tournament |
| 2 | North Korea | 2 | 1 | 0 | 1 | 23 | 3 | +20 | 3 | |
| 3 | Mongolia | 2 | 0 | 0 | 2 | 0 | 38 | −38 | 0 | |
| – | Guam | withdrew | | | | | | | | |

20 May 2002

| China | 17–0 | Mongolia |

22 May 2002

| North Korea | 21–0 | Mongolia |

24 May 2002

| North Korea | 2–3 | China |

== Group 10 ==
All matches were played in Taipei, Taiwan.

| Pos | Team | Pld | W | D | L | GF | GA | GD | Pts | Qualification |
|---|---|---|---|---|---|---|---|---|---|---|
| 1 | Vietnam | 2 | 1 | 1 | 0 | 3 | 2 | +1 | 4 | Final tournament |
| 2 | Indonesia | 2 | 0 | 2 | 0 | 2 | 2 | 0 | 2 | |
| 3 | Chinese Taipei | 2 | 0 | 1 | 1 | 2 | 3 | −1 | 1 | |

19 May 2002

| Indonesia | 1–1 | Vietnam |

21 May 2002

| Chinese Taipei | 1–1 | Indonesia |

23 May 2002

| Chinese Taipei | 1–2 | Vietnam |

== Group 11 ==
All matches were played in Kelana Jaya, Malaysia.

| Pos | Team | Pld | W | D | L | GF | GA | GD | Pts | Qualification |
|---|---|---|---|---|---|---|---|---|---|---|
| 1 | Japan | 3 | 3 | 0 | 0 | 22 | 0 | +22 | 9 | Final tournament |
| 2 | Malaysia | 3 | 2 | 0 | 1 | 16 | 2 | +14 | 6 | |
| 3 | Brunei | 3 | 1 | 0 | 2 | 2 | 21 | −19 | 3 | |
| 4 | Macau | 3 | 0 | 0 | 3 | 1 | 18 | −17 | 0 | |

11 May 2002

| Brunei | 0–11 | Japan |

11 May 2002

| Malaysia | 7–0 | Macau |

13 May 2002

| Macau | 0–9 | Japan |

13 May 2002

| Malaysia | 9–0 | Brunei |

15 May 2002

| Macau | 1–2 | Brunei |

15 May 2002

| Malaysia | 0–2 | Japan |

== Teams qualified for AFC U-17 Championship 2002 ==
- Yemen
- Syria
- Qatar
- India
- Uzbekistan
- Pakistan
- Myanmar
- South Korea
- China
- Vietnam
- Japan
- United Arab Emirates (host)
