= 1994 AFC U-16 Championship qualification =

This page provides information of the qualification for the 1994 AFC U-17 Championship.

== Groups ==
=== Group 1 ===
The group consisted of Jordan, Oman, and Pakistan, with matches played in Amman, Jordan.

Oman qualified for the final tournament.

=== Group 2 ===
The group consisted of United Arab Emirates, Saudi Arabia, Syria and Yemen, with matches played in Damascus, Syria.

United Arab Emirates, Saudi Arabia qualified for the final tournament.

=== Group 3 ===
The group consisted of Kazakhstan, Kyrgyzstan, Tajikistan and Uzbekistan, with matches played in Almaty, Kazakhstan.

Uzbekistan qualified for the final tournament.

=== Group 4 ===
The group consisted of Bahrain, India, Kuwait, with matches played in Tehran, Iran.

Bahrain qualified for the final tournament.

=== Group 5 ===
Pos	Team	Pld	W	D	L	GF	GA	GD	Pts	Qualification
1	China	2	2	0	0	8	0	+8	6	Final tournament
2	Iraq	2	1	0	1	2	3	−1	3	Final tournament
3	Hong Kong	2	0	0	2	1	8	−7	0	

May 18, 1994

Iraq	2–1	Hong Kong

Shijiazhuang, China
May 20, 1994

China	6–0	Hong Kong

Shijiazhuang, China
May 22, 1994

China	2–0	Iraq

Shijiazhuang, China

=== Group 6 ===
The group consisted of Guam, Japan, South Korea, with matches played in Seoul, South Korea.

Japan and South Korea qualified for the final tournament.
