= 2000 AFC U-16 Championship qualification =

Qualification for the 2000 AFC U-16 Championship.

== Group 1 ==
All matches played in Muscat, Oman.

| Pos | Team | Pld | W | D | L | GF | GA | GD | Pts | Qualification |
|---|---|---|---|---|---|---|---|---|---|---|
| 1 | Oman | 3 | 2 | 1 | 0 | 4 | 0 | +4 | 7 | Final tournament |
| 2 | Iraq | 3 | 1 | 1 | 1 | 6 | 3 | +3 | 4 | |
| 3 | Saudi Arabia | 3 | 0 | 2 | 1 | 3 | 5 | −2 | 2 | |
| 4 | United Arab Emirates | 3 | 0 | 2 | 1 | 2 | 7 | −5 | 2 | |

27 July 2000

| Oman | 0–0 | United Arab Emirates |

27 July 2000

| Saudi Arabia | 1–1 | Iraq |

29 July 2000

| United Arab Emirates | 2–2 | Saudi Arabia |

29 July 2000

| Oman | 2–0 | Iraq |

31 July 2000

| Iraq | 5–0 | United Arab Emirates |

31 July 2000

| Oman | 2–0 | Saudi Arabia |

== Group 2 ==
All matches played in Bahrain.

| Pos | Team | Pld | W | D | L | GF | GA | GD | Pts | Qualification |
|---|---|---|---|---|---|---|---|---|---|---|
| 1 | Kuwait | 3 | 3 | 0 | 0 | 10 | 2 | +8 | 9 | Final tournament |
| 2 | Tajikistan | 3 | 2 | 0 | 1 | 6 | 4 | +2 | 6 | |
| 3 | Bahrain | 3 | 1 | 0 | 2 | 7 | 7 | 0 | 3 | |
| 4 | Jordan | 3 | 0 | 0 | 3 | 3 | 13 | −10 | 0 | |
| – | Yemen | Withdrew | | | | | | | | |

July 20, 2000

| Bahrain | 2–3 | Tajikistan |

July 20, 2000

| Jordan | 1–6 | Kuwait |

July 22, 2000

| Bahrain | 4–1 | Jordan |

July 22, 2000

| Tajikistan | 0–1 | Kuwait |

July 24, 2000

| Tajikistan | 3–1 | Jordan |

July 24, 2000

| Bahrain | 1–3 | Kuwait |

== Group 3 ==
All matches played in Tehran, Iran.

| Pos | Team | Pld | W | D | L | GF | GA | GD | Pts | Qualification |
|---|---|---|---|---|---|---|---|---|---|---|
| 1 | Iran | 4 | 4 | 0 | 0 | 23 | 1 | +22 | 12 | Final tournament |
| 2 | Qatar | 4 | 2 | 1 | 1 | 16 | 5 | +11 | 7 | |
| 3 | Kazakhstan | 4 | 2 | 1 | 1 | 16 | 11 | +5 | 7 | |
| 4 | Lebanon | 4 | 1 | 0 | 3 | 9 | 13 | −4 | 3 | |
| 5 | Kyrgyzstan | 4 | 0 | 0 | 4 | 5 | 39 | −34 | 0 | |

June 23, 2000

| Kazakhstan | 1–1 | Qatar |

June 23, 2000

| Iran | 11–1 | Kyrgyzstan |

June 25, 2000

| Lebanon | 2–4 | Qatar |

June 25, 2000

| Iran | 8–0 | Kazakhstan |

June 27, 2000

| Kyrgyzstan | 2–10 | Kazakhstan |

June 27, 2000

| Iran | 2–0 | Lebanon |

June 29, 2000

| Qatar | 11–0 | Kyrgyzstan |

June 29, 2000

| Lebanon | 0–5 | Kazakhstan |

July 1, 2000

| Lebanon | 7–2 | Kyrgyzstan |

July 1, 2000

| Iran | 2–0 | Qatar |

== Group 4 ==
All matches played in Calcutta, India.

| Pos | Team | Pld | W | D | L | GF | GA | GD | Pts | Qualification |
|---|---|---|---|---|---|---|---|---|---|---|
| 1 | Bangladesh | 3 | 2 | 1 | 0 | 4 | 2 | +2 | 7 | Final tournament |
| 2 | India | 3 | 2 | 0 | 1 | 9 | 1 | +8 | 6 | |
| 3 | Pakistan | 3 | 0 | 2 | 1 | 3 | 9 | −6 | 2 | |
| 4 | Sri Lanka | 3 | 0 | 1 | 2 | 1 | 5 | −4 | 1 | |
| – | Bhutan | withdrew | | | | | | | | |

July 20, 2000

| India | 6–0 | Pakistan |

July 21, 2000

| Sri Lanka | 0–1 | Bangladesh |

July 23, 2000

| India | 3–0 | Sri Lanka |

July 24, 2000

| Bangladesh | 2–2 | Pakistan |

July 26, 2000

| India | 0–1 | Bangladesh |

July 27, 2000

| Pakistan | 1–1 | Sri Lanka |

== Group 5 ==
All matches played in Kathmandu, Nepal.

| Pos | Team | Pld | W | D | L | GF | GA | GD | Pts | Qualification |
|---|---|---|---|---|---|---|---|---|---|---|
| 1 | Nepal | 3 | 3 | 0 | 0 | 15 | 3 | +12 | 9 | Final tournament |
| 2 | Uzbekistan | 3 | 2 | 0 | 1 | 7 | 3 | +4 | 6 | |
| 3 | Maldives | 3 | 1 | 0 | 2 | 5 | 14 | −9 | 3 | |
| 4 | Turkmenistan | 3 | 0 | 0 | 3 | 6 | 13 | −7 | 0 | |

June 10, 2000

| Turkmenistan | 0–3 | Uzbekistan |

June 10, 2000

| Nepal | 7–0 | Maldives |

June 12, 2000

| Uzbekistan | 4–0 | Maldives |

June 12, 2000

| Turkmenistan | 3–5 | Nepal |

June 14, 2000

| Turkmenistan | 3–5 | Maldives |

June 14, 2000

| Nepal | 3–0 | Uzbekistan |

== Group 6 ==
All matches played in Bangkok, Thailand.

| Pos | Team | Pld | W | D | L | GF | GA | GD | Pts | Qualification |
|---|---|---|---|---|---|---|---|---|---|---|
| 1 | Thailand | 3 | 3 | 0 | 0 | 11 | 0 | +11 | 9 | Final tournament |
| 2 | Cambodia | 3 | 1 | 1 | 1 | 6 | 3 | +3 | 4 | |
| 3 | Hong Kong | 3 | 1 | 1 | 1 | 5 | 5 | 0 | 4 | |
| 4 | Chinese Taipei | 3 | 0 | 0 | 3 | 0 | 14 | −14 | 0 | |

May 22, 2000

| Thailand | 5–0 | Chinese Taipei |

May 22, 2000

| Hong Kong | 1–1 | Cambodia |

May 24, 2000

| Thailand | 2–0 | Cambodia |

May 24, 2000

| Hong Kong | 4–0 | Chinese Taipei |

May 26, 2000

| Thailand | 4–0 | Hong Kong |

May 26, 2000

| Chinese Taipei | 0–5 | Cambodia |

== Group 7 ==
All matches played in Seoul, South Korea.

| Pos | Team | Pld | W | D | L | GF | GA | GD | Pts | Qualification |
|---|---|---|---|---|---|---|---|---|---|---|
| 1 | China | 3 | 2 | 1 | 0 | 33 | 2 | +31 | 7 | Final tournament |
| 2 | South Korea | 3 | 2 | 1 | 0 | 30 | 2 | +28 | 7 | |
| 3 | Brunei | 3 | 1 | 0 | 2 | 6 | 27 | −21 | 3 | |
| 4 | Mongolia | 3 | 0 | 0 | 3 | 0 | 38 | −38 | 0 | |

May 22, 2000

| China | 19–0 | Mongolia |

May 22, 2000

| South Korea | 15–0 | Brunei |

May 24, 2000

| Brunei | 0–12 | China |

May 24, 2000

| Mongolia | 0–13 | South Korea |

May 26, 2000

| Brunei | 6–0 | Mongolia |

May 26, 2000

| South Korea | 2–2 | China |

== Group 8 ==
All matches played in Nagoya, Japan.

| Pos | Team | Pld | W | D | L | GF | GA | GD | Pts | Qualification |
|---|---|---|---|---|---|---|---|---|---|---|
| 1 | Japan | 3 | 3 | 0 | 0 | 33 | 2 | +31 | 9 | Final tournament |
| 2 | Indonesia | 3 | 2 | 0 | 1 | 15 | 16 | −1 | 6 | |
| 3 | Singapore | 3 | 1 | 0 | 2 | 14 | 12 | +2 | 3 | |
| 4 | Philippines | 3 | 0 | 0 | 3 | 1 | 33 | −32 | 0 | |

June 21, 2000

| Indonesia | 6–4 | Singapore |

June 21, 2000

| Japan | 16–0 | Philippines |

June 23, 2000

| Indonesia | 8–1 | Philippines |

June 23, 2000

| Japan | 6–1 | Singapore |

June 25, 2000

| Singapore | 9–0 | Philippines |

June 25, 2000

| Japan | 11–1 | Indonesia |

== Group 9 ==
All matches played in Yangon, Myanmar.

| Pos | Team | Pld | W | D | L | GF | GA | GD | Pts | Qualification |
|---|---|---|---|---|---|---|---|---|---|---|
| 1 | Myanmar | 3 | 3 | 0 | 0 | 30 | 1 | +29 | 9 | Final tournament |
| 2 | Malaysia | 3 | 2 | 0 | 1 | 18 | 3 | +15 | 6 | |
| 3 | Laos | 3 | 1 | 0 | 2 | 23 | 4 | +19 | 3 | |
| 4 | Guam | 3 | 0 | 0 | 3 | 0 | 63 | −63 | 0 | |

June 8, 2000

| Laos | 1–2 | Malaysia |

June 8, 2000

| Myanmar | 26–0 | Guam |

June 10, 2000

| Malaysia | 1–2 | Myanmar |

June 10, 2000

| Guam | 0–22 | Laos |

June 12, 2000

| Myanmar | 2–0 | Laos |

June 12, 2000

| Guam | 0–15 | Malaysia |

== Qualified teams ==
- Oman
- Kuwait
- Iran
- Bangladesh
- Nepal
- Thailand
- China
- Japan
- Myanmar
- Vietnam (host)
