= 1992 AFC U-16 Championship qualification =

The qualifications for the 1992 AFC U-16 Championship.

== Groups ==
=== Group 1 ===
Pos	Team	Pld	W	D	L	GF	GA	GD	Pts	Qualification
1	United Arab Emirates	2	1	1	0	4	1	+3	3	Final Tournament
2	Kuwait	2	0	1	1	1	4	−3	1	
–	Oman	withdrew								

Kuwait	1–1	United Arab Emirates

United Arab Emirates	3–0	Kuwait

=== Group 2 ===
Pos	Team	Pld	W	D	L	GF	GA	GD	Pts	Qualification
1	Bahrain	3	2	1	0	5	2	+3	5	Final tournament
2	Qatar	3	1	2	0	3	2	+1	4	Final tournament
3	Iran	3	0	2	1	3	5	−2	2	
4	Yemen	3	0	1	2	1	3	−2	1	

Qatar	1–1	Bahrain

Iran	1–1	Yemen

Bahrain	3–1	Iran

Qatar	1–0	Yemen

Yemen	0–1	Bahrain

Qatar	1–1	Iran

=== Group 3 ===
Pos	Team	Pld	W	D	L	GF	GA	GD	Pts	Qualification
1	Bangladesh	4	4	0	0	15	0	+15	8	Final tournament
2	Nepal	4	3	0	1	4	9	−5	6	
3	India	4	2	0	2	9	4	+5	4	
4	Pakistan	4	0	1	3	1	5	−4	1	
5	Maldives	4	0	1	3	1	12	−11	1	

May 3, 1992

Bangladesh	4–0	Maldives

Rajshahi, Bangladesh
May 4, 1992

Nepal	2–1	India

Rajshahi, Bangladesh

May 5, 1992

Pakistan	1–1	Maldives
Mohammad Ayub 24'		Ahmad Saleh

Rajshahi, Bangladesh
May 6, 1992

Bangladesh	8–0	Nepal

Rajshahi, Bangladesh

May 7, 1992

India	2–0	Pakistan
Ajoy Singh ?'; Prosunjit Paul 70' (pen.)

Rajshahi, Bangladesh
May 8, 1992

Nepal	1–0	Maldives

Rajshahi, Bangladesh

May 9, 1992

Bangladesh	1–0	Pakistan
Jahangir 85'

Rajshahi, Bangladesh
May 10, 1992

India	6–0	Maldives
Ajay Singh ?', ?', ?', ?', ?', ?'	Report

Rajshahi, Bangladesh

May 11, 1992

Pakistan	0–1	Nepal
		Gambir Rai 9'

Rajshahi, Bangladesh
May 12, 1992

Bangladesh	2–0	India

Rajshahi, Bangladesh

=== Group 4 ===
Within Group 4 there was planned to be a preliminary group for the following teams: Hong Kong, Macau, Taiwan, Philippines, Vietnam, Guam. The winner would advance to Group 4 proper. However, no result relating to the preliminary group is known and it seems like most/all teams withdrew.

Pos	Team	Pld	W	D	L	GF	GA	GD	Pts	Qualification
1	Thailand	3	3	0	0	21	0	+21	6	Final tournament
2	Indonesia	3	2	0	1	3	5	−2	4	
3	Singapore	3	1	0	2	2	13	−11	2	
4	Malaysia	3	0	0	3	1	9	−8	0	

Malaysia	1–2	Singapore

Malaysia

Thailand	5–0	Indonesia

Malaysia

Indonesia	1–0	Malaysia

Malaysia

Singapore	0–10	Thailand

Malaysia

Malaysia	0–6	Thailand

Malaysia

Indonesia	2–0	Singapore

Malaysia

=== Group 5 ===
Pos	Team	Pld	W	D	L	GF	GA	GD	Pts	Qualification
1	China	3	3	0	0	10	1	+9	6	Final tournament
2	North Korea	3	2	0	1	6	5	+1	4	Final tournament
3	Japan	3	0	1	2	3	8	−5	1	
4	South Korea	3	0	1	2	2	7	−5	1	

May 24, 1992

Japan	1–1	South Korea

Beijing, China
May 24, 1992

China	3–0	North Korea

Beijing, China

May 26, 1992

North Korea	2–1	South Korea

Beijing, China
May 26, 1992

China	3–1	Japan

Beijing, China

May 28, 1992

Japan	1–4	North Korea

Beijing, China
May 28, 1992

China	4–0	South Korea

Beijing, China

== Qualified teams ==
- United Arab Emirates
- Bahrain
- Bangladesh
- Thailand
- China
- North Korea
- Qatar
- Saudi Arabia (host)
