= 1998 AFC U-16 Championship qualification =

The qualifying stage for the 1998 AFC U-16 Championship, an international youth football competition, was organised on the basis of nine groups. The winning team in each group went forward to the final tournament in Qatar, together with Qatar as host nation.

== Group 1 ==
All matches played in Bawsher, Muscat, Oman

Team	Pld	W	D	L	GF	GA	GD	Pts
Oman	3	3	0	0	18	1	+17	9
Kuwait	3	1	1	1	8	4	+4	4
Turkmenistan	3	1	1	1	4	6	−2	4
Palestine	3	0	0	3	1	20	−19	0

20 July 1998

Oman	4–0	Turkmenistan

20 July 1998

Palestine	0–6	Kuwait

22 July 1998

Kuwait	1–3	Oman

22 July 1998

Palestine	1–3	Turkmenistan

24 July 1998

Kuwait	1–1	Turkmenistan

24 July 1998

Oman	11–0	Palestine

== Group 2 ==
All matches played in Tabriz, Iran

Team	Pld	W	D	L	GF	GA	GD	Pts
Iran	2	2	0	0	4	0	+4	6
United Arab Emirates	2	1	0	1	3	1	+2	3
Tajikistan	2	0	0	2	0	6	−6	0
Yemen (W)	0	-	-	-	-	-	—	0

(W) Withdrew
27 July 1998

United Arab Emirates	3–0	Tajikistan

31 July 1998

Iran	1–0	United Arab Emirates

2 August 1998

Iran	3–0	Tajikistan

== Group 3 ==
All matches played in Ha'il, Saudi Arabia

Team	Pld	W	D	L	GF	GA	GD	Pts
Bahrain	2	2	0	0	7	2	+5	6
Jordan	2	1	0	1	3	5	−2	3
Saudi Arabia	2	0	0	2	1	4	−3	0

3 August 1998

Bahrain	5–1	Jordan

5 August 1998

Bahrain	2–1	Saudi Arabia

7 August 1998

Jordan	2–0	Saudi Arabia

== Group 4 ==
All matches played in Hyderabad, India

Team	Pld	W	D	L	GF	GA	GD	Pts
North Korea	3	3	0	0	9	1	+8	9
India	3	1	1	1	6	1	+5	4
Pakistan	3	0	2	1	1	3	−2	2
Kazakhstan	3	0	1	2	2	13	−11	1

24 July 1998

Pakistan	1–1	Kazakhstan

24 July 1998

North Korea	1–0	India

26 July 1998

North Korea	2–0	Pakistan

26 July 1998

India	6–0	Kazakhstan

28 July 1998

North Korea	6–1	Kazakhstan

28 July 1998

Pakistan	0–0	India

== Group 5 ==
All matches played in Kathmandu, Nepal

Team	Pld	W	D	L	GF	GA	GD	Pts
Bangladesh	3	3	0	0	16	0	+16	9
Nepal	3	2	0	1	11	1	+10	6
Sri Lanka	3	1	0	2	8	5	+3	3
Guam	3	0	0	3	0	29	−29	0

20 April 1998

Nepal	10–0	Guam

21 April 1998

Sri Lanka	0–4	Bangladesh

23 April 1998

Guam	0–8	Sri Lanka

24 April 1998

Nepal	0–1	Bangladesh

26 April 1998

Bangladesh	11–0	Guam

27 April 1998

Nepal	1–0	Sri Lanka

== Group 6 ==
All matches played in Tashkent, Uzbekistan

Team	Pld	W	D	L	GF	GA	GD	Pts
Iraq	2	2	0	0	8	1	+7	6
Uzbekistan	2	1	0	1	7	3	+4	3
Maldives	2	0	0	2	0	11	−11	0
Bhutan (W)	0	-	-	-	-	-	—	0

(W) Withdrew
16 June 1998

Iraq	5–0	Maldives

18 June 1998

Uzbekistan	1–3	Iraq

20 June 1998

Uzbekistan	6–0	Maldives

== Group 7 ==
All matches played in Chengdu, China

Team	Pld	W	D	L	GF	GA	GD	Pts
South Korea	2	1	1	0	6	0	+6	4
China	2	1	1	0	6	0	+6	4
Chinese Taipei	2	0	0	2	0	12	−12	0
Philippines (W)	0	-	-	-	-	-	—	0

(W) Withdrew
16 May 1998

South Korea	6–0	Chinese Taipei

18 May 1998

Chinese Taipei	0–6	China

20 May 1998

China	0–0	South Korea
Penalties
	4–5

== Group 8 ==
All matches played in Yangon, Myanmar

Team	Pld	W	D	L	GF	GA	GD	Pts
Japan	4	4	0	0	15	2	+13	12
Myanmar	4	3	0	1	13	4	+9	9
Hong Kong	4	1	1	2	5	9	−4	4
Laos	4	1	1	2	4	11	−7	4
Malaysia	4	0	0	4	3	14	−11	0

25 May 1998

Japan	4–0	Hong Kong

25 May 1998

Laos	0–5	Myanmar

27 May 1998

Hong Kong	4–0	Malaysia

27 May 1998

Japan	4–1	Laos

29 May 1998

Malaysia	2–3	Myanmar

29 May 1998

Hong Kong	1–1	Laos

31 May 1998

Japan	5–0	Malaysia

31 May 1998

Myanmar	4–0	Hong Kong

2 June 1998

Malaysia	1–2	Laos

2 June 1998

Myanmar	1–2	Japan

== Group 9 ==
All matches played in Chon Buri, Thailand

Team	Pld	W	D	L	GF	GA	GD	Pts
Thailand	3	3	0	0	25	0	+25	9
Indonesia	3	1	1	1	8	8	0	4
Singapore	3	1	1	1	4	12	−8	4
Brunei	3	0	0	3	1	18	−17	0

21 April 1998

Thailand	9–0	Singapore

21 April 1998

Brunei	0–6	Indonesia

23 April 1998

Thailand	10–0	Brunei

23 April 1998

Indonesia	2–2	Singapore

25 April 1998

Singapore	2–1	Brunei

25 April 1998

Thailand	6–0	Indonesia

== Qualified teams ==
- Oman
- Iran
- Bahrain
- North Korea
- Bangladesh
- Iraq
- South Korea
- Japan
- Thailand
- Qatar (host)

== Sources ==
- rsssf.com
