= 1985 AFC U-16 Championship qualification =

The qualifying tournament for the 1985 AFC U-16 Championship took place from 20 August to 21 September, 1984.

== Groups ==
=== Group 1A ===
All matches were played in Doha, Qatar.

Pos	Team	Pld	W	D	L	GF	GA	GD	Pts	Qualification
1	Qatar	3	3	0	0	9	1	+8	6	AFC U-16 Championship
2	Iraq	3	2	0	1	3	4	−1	4	AFC U-16 Championship
3	South Korea	3	1	0	2	2	6	−4	2	
4	Bahrain	3	0	0	3	1	4	−3	0	

Bangladesh, Hong Kong, and Sri Lanka withdrew.

September 14, 1984

Qatar	3–0	Iraq

Doha, Qatar
September 15, 1984

South Korea	1–0	Bahrain
Kim, Jong-rok 26'

Khalifa Stadium, Doha, Qatar
September 17, 1984

Qatar	1–0	Bahrain

Doha, Qatar
September 18, 1984

Iraq	1–0	South Korea

Doha, Qatar
September 20, 1984

Iraq	2–1	Bahrain

Doha, Qatar
September 21, 1984

Qatar	5–1	South Korea

Doha, Qatar

=== Group 1B ===
All matches were played in Riyadh, Saudi Arabia.

Pos	Team	Pld	W	D	L	GF	GA	GD	Pts	Qualification
1	South Yemen	3	1	2	0	5	3	+2	4	AFC U-16 Championship
2	Saudi Arabia	3	1	2	0	3	2	+1	4	AFC U-16 Championship
3	United Arab Emirates	3	1	1	1	9	5	+4	3	
4	Syria	3	0	1	2	3	10	−7	1	

Indonesia and Oman withdrew.

September 14, 1984

Saudi Arabia	2–1	United Arab Emirates

Riyadh, Saudi Arabia
September 15, 1984

South Yemen	3–1	Syria

Riyadh, Saudi Arabia
September 17, 1984

United Arab Emirates	6–1	Syria

Riyadh, Saudi Arabia
September 17, 1984

Saudi Arabia	0–0	South Yemen

Riyadh, Saudi Arabia
September 19, 1984

Saudi Arabia	1–1	Syria

Riyadh, Saudi Arabia
September 19, 1984

South Yemen	2–2	United Arab Emirates

Riyadh, Saudi Arabia

=== Group 2A ===
All matches were played in Bangkok, Thailand.

Pos	Team	Pld	W	D	L	GF	GA	GD	Pts	Qualification
1	Kuwait	4	3	0	1	24	1	+23	6	AFC U-16 Championship
2	China	4	3	0	1	15	4	+11	6	AFC U-16 Championship
3	North Yemen	4	2	1	1	20	3	+17	5	
4	India	4	1	1	2	15	5	+10	3	
5	Macau	4	0	0	4	0	61	−61	0	

August 20, 1984

China	2–1	India

Bangkok, Thailand
August 21, 1984

North Yemen	16–0	Macau

Bangkok, Thailand
August 22, 1984

Kuwait	2–0	India

Bangkok, Thailand
August 23, 1984

China	11–0	Macau

Bangkok, Thailand
August 24, 1984

North Yemen	1–1	India

Bangkok, Thailand
August 25, 1984

Kuwait	21–0	Macau

Bangkok, Thailand
August 26, 1984

North Yemen	3–1	China

Bangkok, Thailand
August 27, 1984

India	13–0	Macau

Bangkok, Thailand
August 28, 1984

Kuwait	1–0	North Yemen

Bangkok, Thailand
August 30, 1984

China	1–0	Kuwait

Bangkok, Thailand

=== Group 2B ===
As with Group 2A, all Group 2B matches were also played in Bangkok, Thailand.

Pos	Team	Pld	W	D	L	GF	GA	GD	Pts	Qualification
1	Thailand	4	4	0	0	19	0	+19	8	AFC U-16 Championship
2	Japan	4	2	1	1	8	6	+2	5	AFC U-16 Championship
3	Nepal	4	2	1	1	5	7	−2	5	
4	Philippines	4	1	0	3	3	10	−7	2	
5	Singapore	4	0	0	4	0	12	−12	0	

Iran and Malaysia withdrew.

August 20, 1984

Thailand	5–0	Singapore

Bangkok, Thailand
August 21, 1984

Nepal	2–0	Philippines

Bangkok, Thailand
August 22, 1984

Japan	4–0	Singapore

Bangkok, Thailand
August 23, 1984

Thailand	6–0	Philippines

Bangkok, Thailand
August 24, 1984

Nepal	1–0	Singapore

Bangkok, Thailand
August 25, 1984

Japan	2–1	Philippines

Bangkok, Thailand
August 26, 1984

Thailand	5–0	Nepal

Bangkok, Thailand
August 27, 1984

Philippines	2–0	Singapore

Bangkok, Thailand
August 28, 1984

Japan	2–2	Nepal

Bangkok, Thailand
August 30, 1984

Thailand	3–0	Japan

Bangkok, Thailand
