= 1986 AFC U-16 Championship qualification =

1986 Asian Football Confederation matches

Qualification of the 1986 AFC U-16 Championship.

== Groups ==
=== Group 1 ===
The group consisted of Saudi Arabia, Syria and North Yemen, with matches played in Damascus, Syria.

Saudi Arabia qualified for the final tournament.

=== Group 2 ===
Pos	Team	Pld	W	D	L	GF	GA	GD	Pts	Qualification
1	Bahrain	2	2	0	0	7	2	+5	4	Final tournament
2	Iraq	2	1	0	1	5	3	+2	2	
3	Kuwait	2	0	0	2	0	7	−7	0	

1986

Iraq	2–3	Bahrain

Baghdad, Iraq
1986

Iraq	3–0	Kuwait

Baghdad, Iraq
August 4, 1986

Bahrain	4–0	Kuwait

Baghdad, Iraq

=== Group 3 ===
The group consisted Bangladesh, Nepal, Iran, with matches played in Tehran, Iran.

Bangladesh qualified for the final tournament.

=== Group 4 ===
The group only consisted of Myanmar and India, with only one match played.

June 30, 1986

Myanmar	4–0	India

Rangoon, Myanmar

=== Group 5 ===
The group consisted of Indonesia, Malaysia, Singapore, Thailand, with matches played in Jakarta, Indonesia.

Indonesia qualified for the final tournament.

=== Group 6 ===
The group consisted of China, Hong Kong, North Korea, with matches played in Victoria, Hong Kong.

North Korea qualified for the final tournament.

=== Group 7 ===
The group consisted of Philippines, Japan, South Korea, with matches played in Nagoya, Japan, in August 1986. It is known that South Korea beat Philippines and Japan both by 2–0.

South Korea qualified for the final tournament.
