= 1988 AFC U-16 Championship qualification =

Association football qualification process

This page provides information of the qualification process of the 1988 AFC U-16 Championship.

== Groups ==
=== Group 1 ===
The group matches were played in Kuwait in August, 1988. However, match results were not fully available from online. The final positions are shown below.

Pos	Team	Qualification
1	Saudi Arabia	Final Tournament
2	Iraq	Final Tournament
3	South Yemen	
4	North Yemen	
5	Oman	
6	Kuwait	

=== Group 2 ===
The group consisted Bahrain, Iran, Qatar, and Syria, with matches played in Doha, Qatar.

Bahrain and Qatar qualified for the final tournament.

=== Group 3 ===
Pos	Team	Pld	W	D	L	GF	GA	GD	Pts	Qualification
1	Thailand	4	3	1	0	14	2	+12	7	Final Tournament
2	China	4	3	1	0	5	1	+4	7	Final Tournament
3	India	4	1	1	2	5	8	−3	3	
4	Nepal	4	1	0	3	1	11	−10	2	
5	Bangladesh	4	0	1	3	2	5	−3	1	

May 19, 1988

Bangladesh	1–1	India

Bangkok, Thailand
May 19, 1988

Thailand	1–1	China

Bangkok, Thailand

May 21, 1988

Thailand	2–1	Bangladesh

Bangkok, Thailand
May 21, 1988

India	4–0	Nepal

Bangkok, Thailand

May 23, 1988

China	2–0	India

Bangkok, Thailand
May 23, 1988

Nepal	1–0	Bangladesh

Bangkok, Thailand

May 25, 1988

China	1–0	Nepal

Bangkok, Thailand
May 25, 1988

Thailand	5–0	India

Bangkok, Thailand

May 27, 1988

China	1–0	Bangladesh

Bangkok, Thailand
May 27, 1988

Thailand	6–0	Nepal

Bangkok, Thailand

=== Group 4 ===
Pos	Team	Pld	W	D	L	GF	GA	GD	Pts	Qualification
1	North Korea	3	3	0	0	12	3	+9	6	Final Tournament
2	Indonesia	3	2	0	1	3	3	0	4	Final Tournament
3	Malaysia	3	1	0	2	7	4	+3	2	
4	Singapore	3	0	0	3	2	14	−12	0	

June 14, 1988

Malaysia	6–0	Singapore

Kuala Lumpur, Malaysia
June 14, 1988

North Korea	3–0	Indonesia

Kuala Lumpur, Malaysia

June 16, 1988

Malaysia	0–1	Indonesia

Kuala Lumpur, Malaysia
June 16, 1988

Singapore	2–6	North Korea

Kuala Lumpur, Malaysia

June 18, 1988

Malaysia	1–3	North Korea

Kuala Lumpur, Malaysia
June 18, 1988

Indonesia	2–0	Singapore

Kuala Lumpur, Malaysia

=== Group 5 ===
Pos	Team	Pld	W	D	L	GF	GA	GD	Pts	Qualification
1	Japan	3	2	1	0	20	2	+18	5	Final Tournament
2	South Korea	3	2	1	0	19	2	+17	5	Final Tournament
3	Hong Kong	3	1	0	2	2	12	−10	2	
4	Brunei	3	0	0	3	0	25	−25	0	

April 1, 1988

Brunei	0–2	Hong Kong

Bandar Seri Begawan, Brunei
April 1, 1988

South Korea	2–2	Japan

Bandar Seri Begawan, Brunei

April 3, 1988

Hong Kong	0–7	South Korea

Bandar Seri Begawan, Brunei
April 3, 1988

Japan	13–0	Brunei

Bandar Seri Begawan, Brunei

April 5, 1988

Brunei	0–10	South Korea

Bandar Seri Begawan, Brunei
April 5, 1988

Hong Kong	0–5	Japan

Bandar Seri Begawan, Brunei
