= Mongolia national under-17 football team =

Mongolia Under-17
- Association: MFF
- Confederation: AFC (Asia)
- Sub-confederation: EAFF (East Asia)
- Head coach: Nanjid Dash-Yampil
- Top scorer: Temuulen Erdenetsogt (2)
- FIFA code: MNG
First colours	Second colours

First international
- China 19–0 Mongolia (Seoul, South Korea; 23 May 2000)

Biggest win
- Macau 0–1 Mongolia (Hebei Province, China; 7 October 2007) 09:45 AM, October 27, 2024 Mongolia U17 Mongolia U17 1-0 Full-time Nepal U17 06:30 AM, November 22, 2025 Maldives U17 Maldives U17 0-1 Full-time Mongolia U17 Mongolia U17

Biggest defeat
- North Korea 21–0 Mongolia (Pyongyang, North Korea; 22 May 2001)

FIFA U-17 World Cup
- Appearances: 0

AFC U-16 Championship
- Appearances: 0

The Mongolia national under-17 football team is the national U-17 football team of Mongolia. It is operated under the auspices of the Mongolian Football Federation and is a member of the Asian Football Confederation.

== Players ==
=== Current Squad ===
The following 18 players were selected for the most recent fixtures in the 2026 AFC U-17 Asian Cup qualification.

No.	Pos.	Player	Date of birth (age)	Club
1	GK	Altantur Badrakhsuren		
22	GK	Tuguldur Bayarmagnai		
3	DF	Temuun Jargalan		(Mongolian Football Federation) Deren
4	DF	Guyug Munkhtuvshin		(Mongolian Football Federation) Deren
5	DF	Khanbileg Sainbileg		(Mongolian Football Federation) Deren
13	DF	Batmend Bolorkhuu		
23	DF	Tuvshinbayar Bayanjarga		
11	DF	Khash-Erdene Tseveendorj		
12	DF	Garid Bat-Amgalan		
6	MF	Subeedei Jargalbayar		
8	MF	Mönkh-Orgil Yadamsüren	26 June 2009 (age 17)	(Mongolian Football Federation) SP Falcons
14	MF	Angarag Erkhemjargal		(Mongolian Football Federation) Deren
17	MF	Ulemj Myagmardorj		
7	MF	Enerel Gurragchaa		
15	FW	Irmuun Anand		
9	FW	Sainbayar Batbold (captain)		
10	FW	Reza Akhlaghi		
19	FW	Dulguun Khuyagdorj		

== Results and fixtures ==
=== 2025 ===
22 November 2025 2026 AFC U-17 Asian Cup qualification	Maldives	0-1	Mongolia	Chonburi, Thailand
19:30		Report	Hakeem 45+2' (o.g.)	Stadium: Chonburi Stadium; Referee: Muath Owfi (Palestine)

24 November 2025 2026 AFC U-17 Asian Cup qualification	Mongolia	0-4	Thailand	Chonburi, Thailand
19:30		Report	Phonphithak 35' (pen.), 70'; Pichaya 53'; Phasutha 90+4'	Stadium: Chonburi Stadium; Referee: Yousef Al-Sharshani (Qatar)

26 November 2025 2026 AFC U-17 Asian Cup qualification	Kuwait	5-0	Mongolia	Chonburi, Thailand
15:30	Al-Maraghi 7'; Al-Azemi 32'; Al-Ateeqi 36', 53'; Al-Enezi 90+1'	Report		Stadium: Chonburi Stadium; Referee: Muath Owfi (Palestine)

30 November 2025 2026 AFC U-17 Asian Cup qualification	Mongolia	2-6	Turkmenistan	Chonburi, Thailand
15:30	Munkh-Orgil 16'; Khanbileg 90' (pen.)	Report	Temuun 22' (o.g.); Meredov 34', 47'; Govshudov 49'; Ovezmyradov 75'; Garid 77' (o.g.)	Stadium: Chonburi Stadium; Referee: Ahmad Al-Khawaldeh (Jordan)

=== 2026 ===
8 November 2026 2027 AFC U-17 Asian Cup qualification	Northern Mariana Islands	0-2	Mongolia	Bishkek, Kyrgyzstan
14:00		Report	Gurragchaa 31'; Byambasuren 56'	Stadium: Dolen Omurzakov Stadium, Bishkek; Referee: Lakshay Tushir (India)

11 November 2026 2027 AFC U-17 Asian Cup qualification	Mongolia	1-4	Yemen	Bishkek, Kyrgyzstan
14:00				Stadium: Dolen Omurzakov Stadium, Bishkek

20 November 2026 2027 AFC U-17 Asian Cup qualification	Mongolia	v	Kyrgyzstan	Bishkek, Kyrgyzstan
18:00				Stadium: Dolen Omurzakov Stadium, Bishkek

== Competition record ==
=== FIFA U-17 World Cup ===
FIFA U-17 World Cup
Year	Round	PLD	W	D*	L	GS	GA
(China) 1985	Did not enter	-	-	-	-	-	-
(Canada) 1987	Did not enter	-	-	-	-	-	-
(Scotland) 1989	Did not enter	-	-	-	-	-	-
(Italy) 1991	Did not enter	-	-	-	-	-	-
(Japan) 1993	Did not enter	-	-	-	-	-	-
(Ecuador) 1995	Did not enter	-	-	-	-	-	-
(Egypt) 1997	Did not enter	-	-	-	-	-	-
(New Zealand) 1999	Did not enter	-	-	-	-	-	-
(Trinidad and Tobago) 2001	Did not qualify	-	-	-	-	-	-
(Finland) 2003	Did not qualify	-	-	-	-	-	-
(Peru) 2005	Did not qualify	-	-	-	-	-	-
(South Korea) 2007	Did not qualify	-	-	-	-	-	-
(Nigeria) 2009	Did not qualify	-	-	-	-	-	-
(Mexico) 2011	Withdrew	-	-	-	-	-	-
(United Arab Emirates) 2013	Did not enter	-	-	-	-	-	-
(Chile) 2015	Did not enter	-	-	-	-	-	-
(India) 2017	Did not qualify	-	-	-	-	-	-
(Indonesia) 2023	Did not qualify	-	-	-	-	-	-
(Qatar) 2025	Did not qualify	-	-	-	-	-	-
(Qatar) 2026	Did not qualify	-	-	-	-	-	-
Total							

=== AFC U-17 Asian Cup ===
AFC U-17 Asian Cup
Year	Round	PLD	W	D*	L	GF	GA
(Qatar) 1985	Did not enter	-	-	-	-	-	-
(Qatar) 1986	Did not enter	-	-	-	-	-	-
(Thailand) 1988	Did not enter	-	-	-	-	-	-
(United Arab Emirates) 1990	Did not enter	-	-	-	-	-	-
(Saudi Arabia) 1992	Did not enter	-	-	-	-	-	-
(Qatar) 1994	Did not enter	-	-	-	-	-	-
(Thailand) 1996	Did not enter	-	-	-	-	-	-
(Qatar) 1998	Did not enter	-	-	-	-	-	-
(Vietnam) 2000	Did not qualify	-	-	-	-	-	-
(United Arab Emirates) 2002	Did not qualify	-	-	-	-	-	-
(Japan) 2004	Did not qualify	-	-	-	-	-	-
(Singapore) 2006	Did not qualify	-	-	-	-	-	-
(Uzbekistan) 2008	Did not qualify	-	-	-	-	-	-
(Uzbekistan) 2010	Withdrew	-	-	-	-	-	-
(Iran) 2012	Did not enter	-	-	-	-	-	-
(Thailand) 2014	Did not enter	-	-	-	-	-	-
(India) 2016	Did not qualify	-	-	-	-	-	-
(Malaysia) 2018	Did not qualify	-	-	-	-	-	-
(Bahrain) 2020	Cancelled	-	-	-	-	-	-
(Thailand) 2023	Did not qualify	-	-	-	-	-	-
(Saudi Arabia) 2025	Did not qualify	-	-	-	-	-	-
(Saudi Arabia) 2026	Did not qualify	-	-	-	-	-	-
(Uzbekistan) 2027	to be determined	-	-	-	-	-	-
Total							
