= Choi Min-seo =

South Korean footballer (born 2002)

Personal information
- Date of birth: 5 March 2002 (age 24)
- Place of birth: South Korea
- Height: 1.81 m (5 ft 11 in)
- Position: Forward

Team information
- Current team: Gimpo FC

Youth career
- 2010–2014: Buan Elementary School
- 2015–2021: Pohang Steelers

Senior career*
Years	Team	Apps	(Gls)
2021	Pohang Steelers	0	(0)
2021	→ FC Anyang (loan)	11	(0)
2022-	Gimpo FC		

International career^{‡}
2018	South Korea U16	5	(2)
2019	South Korea U17	8	(3)
- * Club domestic league appearances and goals as of 17:43, 11 February 2022 (UTC) ‡ National team caps and goals as of 14:18, 11 March 2021 (UTC)

- Choi Min-seo
- Hangul: 최민서
- RR: Choe Minseo
- MR: Ch'oe Minsŏ

Choi Min-seo (Korean: 최민서; born 5 March 2002) is a South Korean footballer currently playing as a forward.

== Career statistics ==
=== Club ===
As of 11 February 2022.

Club	Season	League			Cup		Continental		Other		Total	
Club	Season	Division	Apps	Goals	Apps	Goals	Apps	Goals	Apps	Goals	Apps	Goals
Pohang Steelers	2021	K League 1	0	0	0	0	0	0	0	0	0	0
FC Anyang (loan)	2021	K League 2	11	0	0	0	–		0	0	11	0
Gimpo FC	2022	K League 2	0	0	0	0	–		0	0	0	0
Career total			11	0	0	0	0	0	0	0	11	0
