= Hwang Ki-wook =

South Korean footballer (born 1996)

Personal information
- Full name: Hwang Ki-wook
- Date of birth: 10 June 1996 (age 30)
- Place of birth: South Korea
- Height: 1.85 m (6 ft 1 in)
- Position: Defensive midfielder

Team information
- Current team: FC Anyang
- Number: 66

Youth career
- 2012–2014: FC Seoul
- 2015–2016: Yonsei University

Senior career*
Years	Team	Apps	(Gls)
2017–2019	FC Seoul	27	(0)
2017	→ AFC Tubize (loan)	10	(1)
2020–2021	Jeonnam Dragons	54	(3)
2022–	FC Anyang		

International career
2011–2012	South Korea U17	9	(2)
2013–2014	South Korea U20	8	(1)
2016–2018	South Korea U23	8	(0)
- * Club domestic league appearances and goals as of 27 January 2022

- Hwang Ki-wook
- Hangul: 황기욱
- RR: Hwang Giuk
- MR: Hwang Kiuk

Hwang Ki-wook (Korean: 황기욱; born 10 June 1996) is a South Korean football defensive midfielder who plays for FC Anyang.

== Club career ==
Hwang joined FC Seoul in 2017. On 2 April 2017, he made his K League Classic debut against Jeonbuk Hyundai Motors.

In 2020, he was traded with Han Chan-hee and joined Jeonnam Dragons of K League 2.

In 2022, Ki-wook joined FC Anyang.
