= Lee Ji-han =

South Korean footballer (born 2003)

Personal information
- Date of birth: 8 January 2003 (age 23)
- Place of birth: Seoul, South Korea
- Height: 1.82 m (6 ft 0 in)
- Position: Forward

Team information
- Current team: Hwaseong
- Number: 77

Youth career
- 2012–2013: Seocho MB
- 2014–2015: Seoul Shinyoungsan Elementary School
- 2016–2018: Seil Middle School
- 2019–2021: Boin High School

Senior career*
Years	Team	Apps	(Gls)
2022–2024	SC Freiburg II	32	(0)
2024	SGV Freiberg	1	(0)
2025–	Hwaseong	2	(0)
- * Club domestic league appearances and goals as of 16 April 2025

- Lee Ji-han
- Hangul: 이지한
- RR: I Jihan
- MR: I Chihan

Lee Ji-han (Korean: 이지한; born 8 January 2003) is a South Korean professional footballer who plays as a forward for Hwaseong.

== Career statistics ==
As of 10 February 2024

Appearances and goals by club, season and competition
Club	Season	League			Cup		Continental		Other		Total	
Club	Season	Division	Apps	Goals	Apps	Goals	Apps	Goals	Apps	Goals	Apps	Goals
SC Freiburg II	2021–22	3. Liga	5	0	–		–		0	0	5	0
SC Freiburg II	2022–23	3. Liga	14	0	–		–		0	0	14	0
SC Freiburg II	2023–24	3. Liga	12	0	–		–		0	0	12	0
Career total			31	0	0	0	0	0	0	0	31	0
