= Kyrgyzstan national under-17 football team =

National association football team

Kyrgyzstan Under-17
- Nickname: "Ак барстар" (Snow Leopards)
- Association: Kyrgyz Football Union
- Confederation: AFC (Asia)
- Sub-confederation: CAFA (Central Asia)
- Home stadium: Spartak Stadium
- FIFA code: KGZ
First colours	Second colours

First international
- Kazakhstan 3–0 Kyrgyzstan (Astana, Kazakhstan; April 24, 1993)

Biggest win
- Guam 0–9 Kyrgyzstan (Bishkek, Kyrgyzstan; November 26, 2025)

Biggest defeat
- Qatar 11–0 Kyrgyzstan (Tehran, Iran; June 29, 2000)

AFC U-17 Asian Cup
- Appearances: 1 (first in 2016)
- Best result: Group stage (2016)

The Kyrgyzstan national under-17 football team is the under-17 association football team of Kyrgyzstan and is controlled by the Kyrgyz Football Union.

== Competitive record ==
=== FIFA U-17 World Cup ===
For 1985 to 1991 see Soviet Union national under-16 football team.

FIFA U-17 World Cup
Year	Round	PLD	W	D*	L	GS	GA
(Japan) 1993	Did not enter	-	-	-	-	-	-
(Ecuador) 1995	Did not enter	-	-	-	-	-	-
(Egypt) 1997	Did not enter	-	-	-	-	-	-
(New Zealand) 1999	Did not qualify	-	-	-	-	-	-
(Trinidad and Tobago) 2001	Did not qualify	-	-	-	-	-	-
(Finland) 2003	Did not qualify	-	-	-	-	-	-
(Peru) 2005	Did not qualify	-	-	-	-	-	-
(South Korea) 2007	Did not qualify	-	-	-	-	-	-
(Nigeria) 2009	Disqualified	-	-	-	-	-	-
(Mexico) 2011	Did not qualify	-	-	-	-	-	-
(United Arab Emirates) 2013	Did not qualify	-	-	-	-	-	-
(Chile) 2015	Did not qualify	-	-	-	-	-	-
(India) 2017	Did not qualify	-	-	-	-	-	-
(Brazil) 2019	Did not qualify	-	-	-	-	-	-
(Indonesia) 2023	Did not qualify	-	-	-	-	-	-
(Qatar) 2025	Did not qualify						
Total							

=== AFC U-17 Asian Cup ===
Year	Round	PLD	W	D	L	GS	GA
(Saudi Arabia) 1992	Did not enter	-	-	-	-	-	-
(Qatar) 1994	Did not enter	-	-	-	-	-	-
(Thailand) 1996	Did not enter	-	-	-	-	-	-
(Qatar) 1998	Did not enter	-	-	-	-	-	-
(Vietnam) 2000	Did not qualify	-	-	-	-	-	-
(United Arab Emirates) 2002	Did not qualify	-	-	-	-	-	-
(Japan) 2004	Did not qualify	-	-	-	-	-	-
(Singapore) 2006	Did not qualify	-	-	-	-	-	-
(Uzbekistan) 2008	Disqualified	-	-	-	-	-	-
(Uzbekistan) 2010	Did not qualify	-	-	-	-	-	-
(Iran) 2012	Did not qualify	-	-	-	-	-	-
(Thailand) 2014	Did not qualify	-	-	-	-	-	-
(India) 2016	Group stage	3	1	0	2	2	11
(Malaysia) 2018	Did not qualify	-	-	-	-	-	-
(Thailand) 2023	Did not qualify	-	-	-	-	-	-
(Saudi Arabia) 2025	Did not qualify	-	-	-	-	-	-
Total		3	1	0	2	2	11

== Recent results and fixtures ==
Win Draw Lose

=== 2025 ===
22 November AFC U-17 Asian Cup qualification	Kyrgyzstan	0–2	Yemen	Bishkek, Kyrgyzstan
15:00 UTC+6		Report	Al-Nuaimi 56', 87'	Stadium: Dolen Omurzakov Stadium

24 November AFC U-17 Asian Cup qualification	Kyrgyzstan	1–3	Pakistan	Bishkek, Kyrgyzstan
19:00 UTC+6	Ishenbaev 65'	Report	Mustafa 9'; Abdul Samad 23'; Essa 83'	Stadium: Dolen Omurzakov Stadium; Referee: Saif Kamal Aisha (Palestine)

26 November AFC U-17 Asian Cup qualification	Guam	0–9	Kyrgyzstan	Bishkek, Kyrgyzstan
19:30 UTC+6		Report	Kazakov 9'; Mirlanov 29', 30', 56', 61'; Alisherov 63'; Sulpiev 65'; Ishenbaev 85'; Taalaibekov 90+3'	Stadium: Dolen Omurzakov Stadium; Referee: Layth Farhan Faraj (Iraq)

28 November AFC U-17 Asian Cup qualification	Laos	2–3	Kyrgyzstan	Bishkek, Kyrgyzstan
19:00 UTC+6	Anousith 42'; Odin 45+1'	Report	Mirlanov 19'; Grishchenko 26'; Ishenbaev 90+5'	Stadium: Dolen Omurzakov Stadium; Referee: Mohammed Murad Al-Balushi (Oman)

30 November AFC U-17 Asian Cup qualification	Kyrgyzstan	3–0	Cambodia	Bishkek, Kyrgyzstan
15:00 UTC+6	Abilov 27'; Mirlanov 89'; Abdyraev 90+2'	Report		Stadium: Dolen Omurzakov Stadium; Referee: Layth Farhan Faraj (Iraq)

== Head-to-head record ==
The following table shows Kyrgyzstan's head-to-head record in the AFC U-17 Asian Cup.

Opponent	Pld	W	D	L	GF	GA	GD	Win %
Australia	1	1	0	0	1	0	+1	100.00
Japan	1	0	0	1	0	8	−8	0.00
Vietnam	1	0	0	1	1	3	−2	0.00
Total	3	1	0	2	2	11	−9	33.33

== Current Squad ==
The following 22 players were selected for the 2026 AFC U-17 Asian Cup qualification.

No.	Pos.	Player	Date of birth (age)	Club
16	GK	Baiel Tashpolotov	21 March 2009 (age 17)	(Kyrgyz Football Union) Abdysh-Ata Kant
5	DF	Argen Asylbekov		(Kyrgyz Football Union) Abdysh-Ata Kant
15	DF	Ruslan Kolomenskiy		(Kyrgyz Football Union) Abdysh-Ata Kant
18	DF	Yzatbek Turdubaev		(Kyrgyz Football Union) Dordoi Bishkek
12	DF	Pavel Grishchenko		(Kyrgyz Football Union) Ilbirs Bishkek
20	DF	Bektur Khalbaev		(Kyrgyz Football Union) Abdysh-Ata Kant
2	MF	Mustafa Abdyraev		(Kyrgyz Football Union) Ilbirs Bishkek
4	MF	Artem Potorochin		(Kyrgyz Football Union) Abdysh-Ata Kant
11	MF	Elbek Tolonov		(Kyrgyz Football Union) FC Alay Osh
19	MF	Aliyar Alisherov		(Kyrgyz Football Union) Alga Bishkek
23	MF	Kanatbek Rakhatov	9 January 2010 (age 16)	(Kyrgyz Football Union) Abdysh-Ata Kant
3	MF	Eldar Talasbekov		(Kyrgyz Football Union) Ilbirs Bishkek
14	MF	Bekbol Nurbekov		(Kyrgyz Football Union) Dordoi Bishkek
6	MF	Aleksandr Berezyuk (captain)	4 January 2008 (age 18)	(Kyrgyz Football Union) Abdysh-Ata Kant
22	MF	Ariet Abilov	24 June 2010 (age 16)	(Kyrgyz Football Union) Ilbirs Bishkek
8	FW	Ulukbek Ishenbaev		(Kyrgyz Football Union) Dordoi Bishkek
21	FW	Ulukbek Sulpiev	18 June 2009 (age 17)	(Kyrgyz Football Union) Ilbirs Bishkek
13	FW	Kairat Abdimutalipov	8 February 2005 (age 21)	(Kazakhstan Football Federation) Arys
7	FW	Ular Bakiev	14 August 2009 (age 17)	(Kyrgyz Football Union) Ilbirs Bishkek
9	FW	Bekzat Kazakov		(Kyrgyz Football Union) Dordoi Bishkek
10	FW	Baymuras Taalaybekov		
17	FW	Baiel Mirlanov	27 January 2010 (age 16)	(Kyrgyz Football Union) Abdysh-Ata Kant
