= Kazakhstan national under-17 football team =

National U-17 association football team

Kazakhstan Under-17
- Association: Football Federation of Kazakhstan
- Head coach: (Spain) Carles Martorell
First colours	Second colours

First international
- Kazakhstan 5–0 Kyrgyzstan (Almaty, Kazakhstan, 24 April 1993)

Biggest win
- Liechtenstein 0–8 Kazakhstan (Almaty, Kazakhstan, 24 October 2011; Kyrgyzstan 2–10 Kazakhstan (Tehran, Iran, 27 June 2000)

Biggest defeat
- Portugal 10–0 Kazakhstan ( Aviero, Portugal, 10 October 2018)

The Kazakhstan national under-17 football team is the national under-17 football team of Kazakhstan and is controlled by the Football Federation of Kazakhstan. The team competes in the annual UEFA European Under-17 Football Championship.

== Current squad ==
The following players were called up for the most recent matches in 2026 UEFA European Under-17 Championship qualification.

No.	Pos.	Player	Date of birth (age)	Club
1	GK	Kamil Gaynullin	21 January 2009 (age 17)	(Kazakhstan Football Federation) Kairat
12	GK	Alikhan Shayzada	18 April 2009 (age 17)	(Kazakhstan Football Federation) Shakhter
23	GK	Nikita Kildzhiev	15 February 2009 (age 17)	(Kazakhstan Football Federation) Shakhter
4	DF	Nurali Azatkazy	12 June 2009 (age 17)	(Kazakhstan Football Federation) Shakhter
5	DF	Meirlan Baltabaev	15 January 2009 (age 17)	(Kazakhstan Football Federation) Kairat
8	DF	Islam Rakym	23 March 2009 (age 17)	(Kazakhstan Football Federation) Kairat
16	DF	Alikhan Abdi	5 February 2010 (age 16)	(Kazakhstan Football Federation) Kairat
20	DF	Alfir Khanafi	24 May 2009 (age 17)	(Kazakhstan Football Federation) Kairat
14	DF	Zhanibek Zhailaubek	24 April 2009 (age 17)	(Kazakhstan Football Federation) Kairat
2	DF	Marlen Amrenov	23 January 2009 (age 17)	(Kazakhstan Football Federation) Kairat
3	DF	Mansur Avaskhanov	23 October 2009 (age 17)	(Kazakhstan Football Federation) Kairat
13	DF	Nikita Lisokhmar	6 January 2010 (age 16)	(Kazakhstan Football Federation) Tobol
6	MF	Damir Yusupbekov	26 January 2009 (age 17)	(Kazakhstan Football Federation) Kairat
18	MF	Rinat Beybitov	26 May 2009 (age 17)	(Kazakhstan Football Federation) Aktobe
24	MF	Arman Akhmet	2 May 2009 (age 17)	(Kazakhstan Football Federation) Zhas Kyran Almaty
7	MF	Alikhan Zhumabek	13 July 2009 (age 17)	(Kazakhstan Football Federation) Kairat
21	MF	Sharipzhan Sharipkhan	3 February 2009 (age 17)	(Kazakhstan Football Federation) Khan Tengri
19	MF	Rasul Akimov (captain)	6 February 2009 (age 17)	(Kazakhstan Football Federation) Shakhter
10	FW	Abylay Zhilkaydar	13 April 2009 (age 17)	(Kazakhstan Football Federation) Kairat
17	FW	Magzum Zholaman	18 July 2009 (age 17)	(Kazakhstan Football Federation) Caspiy
9	FW	Rasul Dosan	7 March 2009 (age 17)	(Kazakhstan Football Federation) Atyrau
11	FW	Roman Chernomorets	11 May 2010 (age 16)	(Kazakhstan Football Federation) Kairat
15	FW	Anuar Tolendy	19 December 2010 (age 15)	(Kazakhstan Football Federation) Akademiya KFF
22	FW	Digdar Omarov	19 October 2009 (age 17)	(Kazakhstan Football Federation) Shakhter

== Results ==
Win Draw Loss Fixture

== See also ==
- Kazakhstani graduates of Olé Brasil C.F. (born 1994)
