= Macau national under-17 football team =

National association football team

Macau
- Nickname: Verdes (The Greens)
- Association: Associação de Futebol de Macau-China
- Confederation: AFC (Asia)
- Sub-confederation: EAFF (East Asia)
- Home stadium: Estádio Campo Desportivo
- FIFA code: MAC
First colours	Second colours

First international
- North Yemen 16–0 Macau (Bangkok, Thailand; 21 August 1984)

Biggest win
- Northern Mariana Islands 0–2 Macau (Hanoi, Vietnam; 30 November 2025)

Biggest defeat
- Macau 0–26 Japan (Paju, South Korea; 15 November 2005)

The Macau national under-17 football team is the under-17 football (soccer) team of Macau and is controlled by the Football Association of Macau, China.

== Competitive record ==
=== FIFA U-17 World Cup record ===
FIFA U-17 World Cup Record
Year	Round	GP	W	D	L	GS	GA
(China) 1985	Did not qualify						
(Canada) 1987	Did not enter						
(Scotland) 1989	Did not enter						
(Italy) 1991	Did not qualify						
(Japan) 1993	Did not enter						
(Ecuador) 1995	Did not enter						
(Egypt) 1997	Did not enter						
(New Zealand) 1999	Did not enter						
(Trinidad and Tobago) 2001	Did not enter						
(Finland) 2003	Did not qualify						
(Peru) 2005	Did not qualify						
(South Korea) 2007	Did not qualify						
(Nigeria) 2009	Disqualified						
(Mexico) 2011	Did not qualify						
(United Arab Emirates) 2013	Withdrew						
(Chile) 2015	Did not qualify						
(India) 2017	Did not qualify						
(Brazil) 2019	Did not qualify						
(Indonesia) 2023	Did not qualify						
(Qatar) 2025	Did not qualify						
Total	-	-	-	-	-	-	-

=== AFC U-17 Asian Cup record ===
AFC U-17 Asian Cup Record
Year	Round	GP	W	D	L	GS	GA
(Qatar) 1985	Did not qualify						
(Qatar) 1986	Did not enter						
(Thailand) 1988	Did not enter						
(United Arab Emirates) 1990	Did not qualify						
(Saudi Arabia) 1992	Did not enter						
(Qatar) 1994	Did not enter						
(Thailand) 1996	Did not enter						
(Qatar) 1998	Did not enter						
(Vietnam) 2000	Did not enter						
(United Arab Emirates) 2002	Did not qualify						
(Japan) 2004	Did not qualify						
(Singapore) 2006	Did not qualify						
(Uzbekistan) 2008	Disqualified						
(Uzbekistan) 2010	Did not qualify						
(Iran) 2012	Withdrew						
(Thailand) 2014	Did not qualify						
(India) 2016	Did not qualify						
(Malaysia) 2018	Did not qualify						
(Thailand) 2023	Did not enter						
(Saudi Arabia) 2025	Did not qualify						
Total	-	-	-	-	-	-	-

== Recent results and fixtures ==
=== 2025 ===
22 November 2026 AFC U-17 ACQ	Macau	0–2	Hong Kong	Hanoi, Vietnam
16:00 UTC+7		Report	Tung 19'; Sean Wong 58'	Stadium: Vietnam YFTC Field No. 3 Referee: Ismaeel Fazal (Pakistan)

24 November 2026 AFC U-17 ACQ	Macau	1–1	Singapore	Hanoi, Vietnam
19:00 UTC+7	Chan U Chit 40'	Report	Zharfan 88'	Stadium: Vietnam YFTC Field No. 3 Referee: Daniel Cook (Australia)

26 November 2026 AFC U-17 ACQ	Macau	0–5	Malaysia	Hanoi, Vietnam
19:00 UTC+7		Report	Alif Ashraf 39', 40', 51'; Iman Danish 86', 90+3'	Stadium: Vietnam YFTC Field No. 3 Referee: Afsheen Naseer (Maldives)

28 November 2026 AFC U-17 ACQ	Macau	0–4	Vietnam	Hưng Yên, Vietnam
19:00 UTC+7		Report	Triệu Đình Vỹ 9'; Trần Mạnh Quân 22'; Trần Ngọc Sơn 33'; Trương Nguyễn Duy Khang 37'	Stadium: PVF Stadium; Referee: Saleh Al-Ghamdi (Saudi Arabia)

30 November 2026 AFC U-17 ACQ	Macau	2–0	Northern Mariana Islands	Hanoi, Vietnam
16:00 UTC+7	Leong Hou Teng 47'; Ng Kuan Hou 54'	Report		Stadium: Vietnam YFTC Field No. 3 Referee: Afsheen Naseer (Maldives)

=== 2026 ===
08 November 2027 AFC U-17 ACQ	Macau	1–0	Bhutan	Ras Al Khaimah
19:20 UTC+4	Chow Man Nok Matias 69' (pen.)	Report		Stadium: Saud Bin Saqr Al Qasimi Stadium, Referee: Mrutyunjay Lingaraj Amatya (India)

== Most recent squad ==
The following 23 players were named to participate in the AFC U-17 Asian Cup qualifiers held in November 2026.

No.	Pos.	Player	Date of birth (age)	Caps	Club
1	GK	Chan Cheok Hei Travis	2011		Benfica de Macau
20	GK	Leong Hoi Teng	2010		(Macau) MUST IPO
22	GK	Chu Hou In	2010		(Macau) Shao Jiang
2	DF	Hu Kuong Wang		{{{caps}}}	{{{club}}}
3	DF	Tang Chin Long Harrison	2010	{{{caps}}}	{{{club}}}
4	DF	Ho Fei Ieong Alfie Alfie	2010		(Macau) MUST IPO
5	DF	Sio Wai Lim	2011		Benfica de Macau
6	DF	Chan Hong Ching	2010		(Macau) Cheng Fung
8	DF	Leong Hou Teng	2010		(Macau) GALA
23	DF	Pang Iok Fei	2010		(Macau) SASL
7	MF	Sin Chon Hei Nuno	2011		(Hong Kong) Kitchee
10	MF	Wu Chi Him	2010		(Macau) GALA
11	MF	Chow Man Nok Matias	2010		(Macau) MUST IPO
13	MF	Ye Zi Heng	2010		(Macau) Shao Jiang
15	MF	Leong Chi Kei	2010		(Macau) CHESSMAN CHIBA
16	MF	Che Cheok Long	2010		(Macau) Cheng Fung
18	MF	Cheang Hou Hin	2010		(Macau) CHESSMAN CHIBA
21	MF	Chan U Chit	2011		(Macau) CHESSMAN CHIBA
9	FW	Si Tou Chi Fung	2010		
12	FW	Ng Wang Kwan	2011		(Macau) CHESSMAN CHIBA
17	FW	Wong Tak Chon	2010		(Macau) MUST IPO
19	FW	Chan In Hei	2010		(Macau) SASL

=== 2025 ===
The following 23 players were named to participate in the AFC U-17 Asian Cup qualifiers held in November-December 2025.

No.	Pos.	Player	Date of birth (age)	Caps	Club
1	GK	Cheong Chi Him Travis	2009		
20	GK	Chen Chi Wa	2009		
22	GK	Che Long Sam	2009		(Macau) MUST IPO
2	DF	Kung Tsz To	2009		(Macau) MUST IPO
3	DF	Tang Chin Long Harrison	2010		(Macau) MUST IPO
4	DF	Ho Fei Ieong Alfie	2010		(Macau) MUST IPO
5	DF	Tang Tin	2009		(Macau) CHESSMAN CHIBA
6	DF	Au Kok Man	2009		(Macau) CHESSMAN CHIBA
12	DF	Kuok Tek Wang	2009		(Macau) Shao Jiang
21	DF	Chan U Chit	2011		(Macau) CHESSMAN CHIBA
23	DF	De Sousa Daniel Augusto	2009		(Macau) Shao Jiang
7	MF	Sin Chon Hei Nuno	2010		(Hong Kong) Eastern
8	MF	Leong Hou Teng	2010		(Macau) MUST IPO
11	MF	Chow Man Nok Matias	2010		(Macau) MUST IPO
13	MF	Kuong Chi Hin	2009		(Macau) Shao Jiang
14	MF	Cheong Ka Long	2009		(Macau) CHESSMAN CHIBA
15	MF	Wong Tak Chon	2010		(Macau) MUST IPO
19	MF	Leong Wai Chon	2009		(Macau) MUST IPO
18	MF	Si Tou Chi Fung	2010		
9	FW	Chong Chon Iat	2009		(Macau) Cheng Fung
10	FW	Ng Kuan Hou	2009		Benfica de Macau
16	FW	Tugla Batu	2010		(Macau) CHESSMAN CHIBA
17	FW	Wu Chi Him	2010		(Macau) MUST IPO

== See also ==
- Sports in Macau
