= Guam national under-17 football team =

Guam Under-17
- Nickname: Youth Matao
- Association: Guam Football Association
- Confederation: AFC (Asia)
- Sub-confederation: EAFF (East Asia)
- Head coach: Samuel San Gil
- Captain: Micah Elwell
- Home stadium: Guam National Football Stadium
- FIFA code: GUM
First colors	Second colors

First international
- Nepal 10–0 Guam (20 April 1998)

Biggest win
- Macau 0–6 Guam (Hebei, China; 26 September 2009)

Biggest defeat
- Tajikistan 33–0 Guam (Bishan, Singapore; 23 October 2024)

The Guam national under-17 football team is the national association football youth team for the United States territory of Guam and is controlled by the Guam Football Association. They are affiliated with the Asian Football Confederation's East Asian Football Federation region.

== Current squad ==
The following 23 players were called up for the 2026 AFC U-17 Asian Cup qualification.

No.	Pos.	Player	Date of birth (age)	Club
1	GK	Liam Ralph		
18	GK	Micah Tavarez		
21	GK	Renzel Reburiano	7 November 2009 (age 17)	
10	DF	David Benavente		
12	DF	Cole Sablan		
14	DF	Ryotaro Suzuki		
15	DF	Levi Barnhart		
17	DF	Alex Ko		
8	DF	Nikko Byerly		
23	DF	William Walls		
2	DF	Haruki Okamato		
11	DF	Orian Cazares		
3	MF	Mason Manibusan	9 June 2009 (age 17)	
4	MF	Gage Cruz		
7	MF	Justin Kwan		
13	MF	Nehemiah Nauta		
16	MF	Chima Mbakwem Jr.		
19	MF	Trystan Santos		
5	MF	Malcom Ogo	10 April 2009 (age 17)	
22	MF	Nathan Quilantip		
9	FW	Landen Cruz	30 January 2009 (age 17)	
6	FW	Peter Barcinas		
20	FW	Tariq Butler (captain)		

== Coaching staff ==
As of 25 October 2024

Position	Name
Head coach	(Guam) Dominic Gadia
Assistant coaches	(Guam) Jude Bischoff (Guam) Ralph Awa
Goalkeeping coaches	(Guam) Jeroen Bos
Doctor	(Guam) Kevin Estillore
Physioterapist	(Guam) Walfred Javier
Manager	(Guam) Vance Manibusan

== Competition record ==
- 2023 EAFF U-15 Men's Championship U15 Japan 26-0 Guam
- 2025 AFC U-17 Asian Cup qualification U17 Tajikistan 33-0 Guam

=== FIFA U-17 World Cup record ===
FIFA U-17 World Cup Record
Hosts/Year	Round	GP	W	D	L	GS	GA
(China) 1985	Did not enter						
(Canada) 1987	Did not enter						
(Scotland) 1989	Did not enter						
(Italy) 1991	Did not enter						
(Japan) 1993	Withdrew						
(Ecuador) 1995	Did not qualify						
(Egypt) 1997	Did not enter						
(New Zealand) 1999	Did not qualify						
(Trinidad and Tobago) 2001	Did not qualify						
(Finland) 2003	Withdrew						
(Peru) 2005	Did not qualify						
(South Korea) 2007	Did not qualify						
(Nigeria) 2009	Did not qualify						
(Mexico) 2011	Did not qualify						
(United Arab Emirates) 2013	Did not qualify						
(Chile) 2015	Did not qualify						
(India) 2017	Did not qualify						
(Brazil) 2019	Did not qualify						
(Peru) ~~2021~~	Cancelled due to the COVID-19 pandemic						
(Indonesia) 2023	Did not qualify						
(Qatar) 2025	Did not qualify						
(Qatar) 2026	Did not qualify						
(Qatar) 2027	Did not qualify						
Total	-	-	-	-	-	-	-

=== AFC U-16 Championship / AFC U-17 Asian Cup record ===
AFC U-16 Championship Record
Hosts/Year	Round	GP	W	D	L	GS	GA
(Qatar) 1985	Did not enter						
(Qatar) 1986	Did not enter						
(Thailand) 1988	Did not enter						
(United Arab Emirates) 1990	Did not enter						
(Saudi Arabia) 1992	Withdrew						
(Qatar) 1994	Did not qualify						
(Thailand) 1996	Did not enter						
(Qatar) 1998	Did not qualify						
(Vietnam) 2000	Did not qualify						
(United Arab Emirates) 2002	Withdrew						
(Japan) 2004	Did not qualify						
(Singapore) 2006	Did not qualify						
(Uzbekistan) 2008	Did not qualify						
(Uzbekistan) 2010	Did not qualify						
(Iran) 2012	Did not qualify						
(Thailand) 2014	Did not qualify						
(India) 2016	Did not qualify						
(Malaysia) 2018	Did not qualify						
(Bahrain) ~~2020~~	Cancelled due to the COVID-19 Pandemic						
(Thailand) 2023	Did not qualify						
(Saudi Arabia) 2025	Did not qualify						
(Saudi Arabia) 2026	Did not qualify						
(Uzbekistan) 2027	Did not qualify						
Total	-	-	-	-	-	-	-
