= 1994 AFC U-16 Championship =

Tournament details
- Host country: Qatar
- Dates: 18 October – 1 November
- Teams: 10 (from 1 confederation)

Final positions
- Champions: Japan (1st title)
- Runners-up: Qatar
- Third place: Oman
- Fourth place: Bahrain

Tournament statistics
- Matches played: 24
- Goals scored: 93 (3.88 per match)

The 1994 AFC U-16 Championship is the sixth edition of the tournament, organized by the Asian Football Confederation (AFC) every two years.

== Qualification ==
Qualified teams:

- Bahrain
- China
- Iraq
- Japan
- South Korea
- Oman
- Saudi Arabia
- United Arab Emirates
- Uzbekistan
- Qatar (host)

== Group stage ==
=== Group A ===
Pos	Team	Pld	W	D	L	GF	GA	GD	Pts	Qualification
1	Oman	4	3	0	1	11	2	+9	9	Knockout stage
2	Qatar	4	3	0	1	9	3	+6	9	Knockout stage
3	China	4	2	0	2	14	5	+9	6	
4	Saudi Arabia	4	2	0	2	8	4	+4	6	
5	Uzbekistan	4	0	0	4	3	31	−28	0	

1994-10-19

Qatar	2–1	China

Doha
1994-10-19

Saudi Arabia	6–1	Uzbekistan

Doha

1994-10-21

Oman	2–0	China

Doha
1994-10-21

Qatar	6–1	Uzbekistan

Doha

1994-10-23

China	11–0	Uzbekistan

Doha
1994-10-23

Oman	1–0	Saudi Arabia

Doha

1994-10-25

Oman	8–1	Uzbekistan

Doha
1994-10-25

Qatar	0–1	Saudi Arabia

Doha

1994-10-27

China	2–1	Saudi Arabia

Doha
1994-10-27

Oman	0–1	Qatar

Doha

=== Group B ===
Pos	Team	Pld	W	D	L	GF	GA	GD	Pts	Qualification
1	Bahrain	4	3	0	1	8	4	+4	9	Knockout stage
2	Japan	4	2	0	2	8	6	+2	6	Knockout stage
3	United Arab Emirates	4	1	2	1	10	9	+1	5	
4	Iraq	4	1	1	2	4	7	−3	4	
5	South Korea	4	1	1	2	2	6	−4	4	

1994-10-18

Iraq	0–1	South Korea

Doha
1994-10-18

United Arab Emirates	5–2	Japan

Doha

1994-10-20

Bahrain	2–0	South Korea

Doha
1994-10-20

Iraq	1–0	Japan

Doha

1994-10-22

Bahrain	3–1	United Arab Emirates

Doha
1994-10-22

South Korea	0–3	Japan

Doha

1994-10-24

Bahrain	0–3	Japan

Doha
1994-10-24

Iraq	3–3	United Arab Emirates

Doha

1994-10-26

Bahrain	3–0	Iraq

Doha
1994-10-26

South Korea	1–1	United Arab Emirates

Doha

== Knockout stage ==
=== Semifinals ===
1994-10-30

Oman	3–4 (a.e.t.)	Japan

Doha
1994-10-30

Bahrain	1–2 (a.e.t.)	Qatar

Doha

=== Third-place match ===
1994-11-01

Oman	3–2	Bahrain

Doha

=== Final ===
1994-11-01

Japan	1–0 (a.e.t.)	Qatar
Yamazaki 95'

Doha

== Winners ==
AFC U-16 Championship 1994 winners

Japan
First title

== Teams qualified for 1995 FIFA U-17 World Championship ==
- Japan
- Qatar
- Oman

== Sources ==
- rsssf.com
