= 1992 AFC U-16 Championship =

Tournament details
- Host country: Saudi Arabia
- Dates: 1–11 September
- Teams: 8 (from 1 confederation)

Final positions
- Champions: China (1st title)
- Runners-up: Qatar
- Third place: Saudi Arabia
- Fourth place: North Korea

Tournament statistics
- Matches played: 16
- Goals scored: 46 (2.88 per match)

The winners of the 1992 AFC U-16 Championship, organised by the Asian Football Confederation (AFC) and held once every two years for Asian under-16 teams that also serves as a qualification tournament for the FIFA U-17 World Cup, are listed below.

== Qualification ==
Qualified teams:

- Saudi Arabia (host)
- United Arab Emirates (Group 1 winner)
- Bahrain (Group 2 winner)
- Qatar (Group 2 runner-up)
- Bangladesh (Group 3 winner)
- Thailand (Group 4 winner)
- North Korea (Group 4 runner-up)
- China (Group 5 winner)

== Group stage ==
=== Group A ===
Rank	Team	Pld	W	D	L	GF	GA	GD	Pts	Qualification
1	North Korea	3	2	1	0	5	0	+5	5	Knockout stage
2	Saudi Arabia	3	1	2	0	4	0	+4	4	Knockout stage
3	Bahrain	3	1	1	1	6	4	+2	3	
4	Bangladesh	3	0	0	3	2	13	–11	0	

September 1, 1992

Bahrain	0–0	Saudi Arabia

September 1, 1992

North Korea	3–0	Bangladesh

September 3, 1992

Bangladesh	2–6	Bahrain

September 3, 1992

North Korea	0–0	Saudi Arabia

September 5, 1992

Bahrain	0–2	North Korea

September 5, 1992

Saudi Arabia	4–0	Bangladesh

=== Group B ===
Rank	Team	Pld	W	D	L	GF	GA	GD	Pts	Qualification
1	China	3	2	1	0	3	1	+2	5	Knockout stage
2	Qatar	3	2	0	1	5	3	+2	4	Knockout stage
3	Thailand	3	1	0	2	3	5	–2	2	
4	United Arab Emirates	3	0	1	2	3	5	–2	1	

September 2, 1992

Thailand	0–1	China
		Li Xiaopeng

September 2, 1992

United Arab Emirates	1–2	Qatar

September 4, 1992

China	1–0	Qatar
Li Xiaopeng

September 4, 1992

Thailand	2–1	United Arab Emirates

September 2, 1992

Qatar	3–1	Thailand

September 6, 1992

United Arab Emirates	1–1	China
?		Qu Shengqing

== Knockout stage ==
=== Semifinals ===
September 9, 1992

China	4–1	Saudi Arabia
Yu Genwei; Xu Zheng; Song Yuming

September 9, 1992

North Korea	1–2	Qatar

=== Third-place match ===
September 11, 1992

Saudi Arabia	2–1	North Korea

=== Final ===
September 11, 1992

China	2–2 (a.e.t.)	Qatar
Pang Li; Li Xiaopeng
Penalties
	8–7

== Winners ==
AFC U-16 Championship 1992 winners

China
First title

== Teams qualified for 1993 FIFA U-17 World Championship ==
- China
- Qatar
- Japan (host)

== Sources ==
- rsssf.com
