= Bahrain national under-17 football team =

Bahrain Under-17
- Nickname: Al Ahmar (The Reds)
- Association: Bahrain Football Association
- Confederation: AFC (Asia)
- Sub-confederation: WAFF (West Asia)
- Head coach: Vacant
- Captain: Jassem Kacem Benjemia
- Home stadium: Bahrain National Stadium
- FIFA code: BHR
First colours

FIFA U-17 World Cup
- Appearances: 2 (first in 1989)
- Best result: Fourth place (1989)

AFC U-17 Asian Cup
- Appearances: 7 (first in 1986)
- Best result: Runners-ups (1988)

The Bahrain national under-17 football team is the selection of under-17 players who represent the Bahrain Football Association for two years in competition. They have once been finalists in the AFC U-16 Championship and once finished fourth at the FIFA U-17 World Cup.

Al Ahmar was successful at the FIFA U-17 World Cup way back in 1989 where they topped group A, beating the likes of Cuba and Ghana by 3-0 and 1-0 margins, respectively. They drew with Scotland 1–1 in their final group stage game which helped them top their group. Later in the quarterfinals, they defeated Brazil on penalties and lost to Saudi Arabia in the semifinal hence ending their maiden FIFA U-17 World Cup on a high note by finishing 4th. They have played only one more world cup since then (in 1997) where they finished 3rd in their group, winning only one game.

Bahrain enjoyed the success in AFC U-16 competitions as well. Their best result came in 1988 where they finished as runners up losing to Saudi Arabia in final. After failing to qualify in 1990 edition, they qualified for the next 4 editions until 1998, but this time, the best they could achieve was 3rd place in 1996 and 1998 editions.

Since 2010 edition, Bahrain failed to qualify for AFC U-17 Asian Cup until 2025.

== Squad ==
=== Current Squad ===
The following 23 players were called up for the 2026 AFC U-17 Asian Cup qualification.

No.	Pos.	Player	Date of birth (age)	Club
1	GK	Hussein Ebrahim Al-Majed	12 March 2009 (aged 17)	(Bahrain Football Association) Al-Najma
21	GK	Abdulla Khalil	14 September 2009 (aged 16)	(Bahrain Football Association) Manama
22	GK	Omar Al-Balooshi	16 November 2009 (aged 16)	(Bahrain Football Association) Budaiya
3	DF	Sayed Hasan Al-Moosawi	10 November 2009 (aged 16)	(Bahrain Football Association) Manama
4	DF	Kumail Al-Satrawi	3 March 2009 (aged 17)	(Bahrain Football Association) Al-Ettihad Club
5	DF	Hussain Zain Al-Deen	7 January 2009 (aged 17)	(Bahrain Football Association) Al-Shabab
14	DF	Khaled Al-Khaja	5 July 2009 (aged 16)	(Bahrain Football Association) Manama
20	DF	Mohamed Ateya	19 February 2010 (aged 16)	(Bahrain Football Association) Al-Riffa
2	DF	Karrar Howaida	12 July 2009 (aged 16)	(Bahrain Football Association) Manama
23	DF	Haitham Shafi	22 January 2010 (aged 16)	(Bahrain Football Association) Riffa
16	DF	Ahmed Hani	24 May 2009 (aged 16)	(Bahrain Football Association) Al-Shabab
6	MF	Mohamed Salah	27 July 2009 (aged 16)	(Bahrain Football Association) Riffa
12	MF	Badr Abdelaziz	16 February 2010 (aged 16)	(Bahrain Football Association) Manama
8	MF	Eyad Mustafa	12 January 2009 (aged 17)	(Bahrain Football Association) Manama
19	MF	Faisal Abdulsalam	11 April 2009 (aged 16)	(Bahrain Football Association) Riffa
10	MF	Jassem Kacem Benjemia (captain)	5 February 2009 (aged 17)	(Bahrain Football Association) Al-Muharraq
18	MF	Esam Mohamed	14 July 2009 (aged 16)	(Bahrain Football Association) Riffa
7	FW	Mohamed Al-Jazzaf	8 March 2009 (aged 17)	(Bahrain Football Association) Manama
11	FW	Mohamed Al-Hassouni	10 December 2009 (aged 16)	(Bahrain Football Association) Al-Riffa
15	FW	Hasan Ramadhan Al-Naser	21 June 2009 (aged 16)	(Bahrain Football Association) Al-Riffa
17	FW	Abdulrahman Majed	3 January 2010 (aged 16)	(Bahrain Football Association) Al-Hidd
9	FW	Hussain Zuhair Darwish	29 May 2009 (aged 16)	(Bahrain Football Association) Al-Muharraq
13	FW	Omran Adel	5 September 2009 (aged 16)	(Bahrain Football Association) Al-Shabab

== Fixtures and results ==
=== 2025 ===
Win Draw Lose

22 November 2025 2026 AFC U17 Q	China	2–0	Bahrain	Chongqing, China
14:35 AST		Report		Stadium: Tongliang Long Stadium

24 November 2025 2026 AFC U17 Q	Bahrain	2–1	Sri Lanka	Chongqing, China
09:00 AST	Kumail Fadhel Alsatrawi 80'; Mohammed Al Jazaf 43'	Report	Mohamed Zaid 90'	Stadium: Yongchuan Sports Center

26 November 2025 2026 AFC U17 Q	Timor-Leste	0–3	Bahrain	Chongqing, China
09:00 AST		Report		Stadium: Tongliang Long Stadium

28 November 2025 2026 AFC U17 Q	Bangladesh	2–1	Bahrain	Chongqing, China
10:00 AST	Bostami 59'; Manik 72'	Report	Zuhair 85'	Stadium: Yongchuan Sports Center

30 November 2025 2026 AFC U17 Q	Bahrain	10–0	Brunei	Chongqing, China
14:35 AST		Report		Stadium: Yongchuan Sports Center; Referee: Yahya Al-Balushi (Oman)

== Performance at the AFC U-17 Asian Cup ==
Host nation(s) / Year	Round
(Qatar) 1985	Did not qualify
(Qatar) 1986	Group stage
(Thailand) 1988	Finalist
(United Arab Emirates) 1990	Did not qualify
(Saudi Arabia) 1992	Group stage
(Qatar) 1994	4th place
(Thailand) 1996	3rd place
(Qatar) 1998	3rd place
(Vietnam) 2000	Did not qualify
(United Arab Emirates) 2002	Did not qualify
(Japan) 2004	Did not qualify
(Singapore) 2006	Did not qualify
(Uzbekistan) 2008	Group stage
(Uzbekistan) 2010	Did not qualify
(Iran) 2012	Did not qualify
(Thailand) 2014	Did not qualify
(India) 2016	Did not qualify
(Malaysia) 2018	Did not qualify
(Bahrain) 2020	Tournament Cancelled
(Thailand) 2023	Did not qualify
(Saudi Arabia) 2025	Did not qualify

- Red border color indicates tournament was held on home soil.

== Performance at the FIFA U-17 World Cup ==
FIFA U-17 World Cup record
Year	Result	Position	Pld	W	D*	L	GF	GA
(China) 1985 – (Canada) 1987	Did not qualify							
(Scotland) 1989	Semi final	4th	6	2	2	2	5	5
(Italy) 1991 – (Ecuador) 1995	Did not qualify							
(Egypt) 1997	Group stage	12th	3	1	0	2	4	8
(New Zealand) 1999 - (Qatar) 2026	Did not qualify							
Total	2/20	0 Titles	9	3	2	4	9	13

FIFA U-17 World Cup History
Year	Round	Score	Result
(Scotland) 1989	Round 1	Cuba 0–3 Bahrain	Win
(Scotland) 1989	Round 1	Ghana 0-1 Bahrain	Win
(Scotland) 1989	Round 1	Scotland 1–1 Bahrain	Draw
1989	Quarterfinals	Bahrain 0(4)–0(1) Brazil	Win
1989	Semifinal	Bahrain 0–1 Saudi Arabia	Loss
(Egypt) 1997	Round 1	Costa Rica 1–3 Bahrain	Win
(Egypt) 1997	Round 1	Ghana 5-1 Bahrain	Loss
(Egypt) 1997	Round 1	Argentina 2–0 Bahrain	Loss

== Honours ==
- FIFA U-17 World Cup
  - 4th Place: (1989)
- AFC U-17 Asian Cup
  - Runners up(1): (1988)
  - Third Place(2): (1996, 1998)
  - 4th Place(1): (1994)

== Head-to-head record ==
The following table shows Bahrain's head-to-head record in the FIFA U-17 World Cup and AFC U-17 Asian Cup.

=== In FIFA U-17 World Cup ===
Opponent	Pld	W	D	L	GF	GA	GD	Win %
Argentina	1	0	0	1	0	2	−2	0.00
Brazil	1	0	1	0	0	0	+0	0.00
Costa Rica	1	1	0	0	3	1	+2	100.00
Cuba	1	1	0	0	3	0	+3	100.00
Ghana	2	1	0	1	2	5	−3	50.00
Portugal	1	0	0	1	0	3	−3	0.00
Saudi Arabia	1	0	0	1	0	1	−1	0.00
Scotland	1	0	1	0	1	1	+0	0.00
Total	9	3	2	4	9	13	−4	33.33

=== In AFC U-17 Asian Cup ===
Opponent	Pld	W	D	L	GF	GA	GD	Win %
Bangladesh	2	2	0	0	8	2	+6	100.00
China	2	1	1	0	6	0	+6	50.00
India	1	1	0	0	3	2	+1	100.00
Indonesia	1	0	1	0	2	2	+0	0.00
Iran	2	1	0	1	2	3	−1	50.00
Iraq	1	1	0	0	3	0	+3	100.00
Japan	3	0	1	2	1	5	−4	0.00
Myanmar	1	0	0	1	0	1	−1	0.00
North Korea	2	0	1	1	3	5	−2	0.00
Oman	3	1	0	2	4	5	−1	33.33
Qatar	1	0	0	1	1	2	−1	0.00
Saudi Arabia	3	0	2	1	0	2	−2	0.00
Singapore	1	1	0	0	3	0	+3	100.00
South Korea	5	4	1	0	12	4	+8	80.00
Thailand	3	0	1	2	2	10	−8	0.00
United Arab Emirates	1	1	0	0	3	1	+2	100.00
Uzbekistan	1	0	0	1	0	2	−2	0.00
Total	33	13	8	12	53	46	+7	39.39

== See also ==
- Bahrain national football team
- AFC U-17 Asian Cup
- FIFA U-17 World Cup
