= Kuwait national under-17 football team =

Kuwait Under-17
- Association: Kuwait Football Association
- Confederation: AFC (Asia)
- Head coach: Tareq Al-Khulaifi
- FIFA code: KUW
First colours	Second colours

FIFA U-17 World Cup
- Appearances: 0

Asian Championship
- Appearances: 6 (first in 2000)
- Best result: Quarterfinals (2004 & 2012)

WAFF U-16 Championship
- Appearances: 3 (first in 2009)
- Best result: Group stage (2009, 2019, 2022)

The Kuwait national under-17 football team is the youth association football team representing Kuwait in youth competitions and it is controlled by the Kuwait Football Association.

== Results ==
The following is a list of match results in the last 12 months, as well as any future matches that have been scheduled.

Win Draw Loss Fixture

== Players ==
=== Current Squad ===
The following 23 players were selected for the most recent fixtures in the 2026 AFC U-17 Asian Cup qualification

No.	Pos.	Player	Date of birth (age)	Club
1	GK	Abdulrahman Al-Ruwaidhan	2 November 2009 (age 17)	
22	GK	Ahmad Al-Hazza		
23	GK	Ahmad Al-Shawaf	3 April 2009 (age 17)	(Kuwait Football Association) Al-Arabi
2	DF	Turki Al-Hajri		
3	DF	Zaid Al-Saqer		
4	DF	Belal Mubarak	30 June 2009 (age 17)	(Kuwait Football Association) Kuwait SC
5	DF	Omar Redha		
7	DF	Shafi Al-Qahtani		
12	DF	Abdulrahman Al-Azemi		
13	DF	Abdullah Al-Soulah		
18	DF	Mohamad Al-Ateeqi		
6	MF	Ali Al-Maraghi		
8	MF	Abdulramman Al-Enezi		
10	MF	Abdullah Al-Khajee		
11	MF	Abdullah Al-Mutairi (captain)		
14	MF	Abdulwahab Adhfairi		
15	MF	Abdullah Al-Homaid		
20	MF	Yosef Muzail		
9	FW	Bader Al-Dawood		
16	FW	Fahad Al-Husaini		
17	FW	Haidar Nadoum		
19	FW	Saqer Al-Ayoub		
21	FW	Jaber Sanan		(Kuwait Football Association) Kazma

== Participation in Tournaments ==
=== AFC U-16 Championship ===
- 1985: Withdrew
- 1986 to 1994: DNQ
- 1996: Group Stage
- 1998: DNQ
- 2000: Group stage
- 2002: DNQ
- 2004: Quarterfinals
- 2006 to 2008: DNQ
- 2010: Group stage
- 2012: Quarterfinals
- 2014: Group stage
- 2016 to 2018: Suspended

=== FIFA U-17 World Cup ===
- 1985 to 2015: DNQ
- 2017 to 2019: Suspended
- 2023 to 2025: DNQ

== See also ==
- Kuwait national football team
- Kuwait national under-23 football team
- Kuwait women's national football team
