= 2026 SAFF U-17 Championship =

Tournament details
- Host country: Pakistan
- Teams: 7 (from 1 sub-confederation)

The 2026 SAFF U-17 Championship was to be the 11th edition of the SAFF U-17 Championship, an international football competition for men's under-17 national teams organized by South Asian Football Federation (SAFF). The tournament was scheduled to be held from 26 July–07 August 2026 in Islamabad, Pakistan, but was ultimately cancelled due to financial constraints.

== Venue ==
All matches were to be played at the Jinnah Stadium in Islamabad, Pakistan.

Islamabad	2026 SAFF U-17 Championship is located in Pakistan
Jinnah Sports Stadium	2026 SAFF U-17 Championship is located in Pakistan
Capacity: 48,700	2026 SAFF U-17 Championship is located in Pakistan

== Participating teams ==
These seven teams were to participate in this tournament.

Team	Appearances	Previous best performance
Bangladesh	11th	Champion (2015, 2018)
Bhutan	9th	Fourth place (2017)
India	11th	Champion (2013, 2017, 2019, 2022, 2023, 2024, 2025)
Maldives	9th	Group stage (2011, 2015, 2017, 2018, 2022)
Nepal	11th	Runners-up (2013, 2017, 2019, 2022)
Pakistan (Host)	7th	Champion (2011)
Sri Lanka	9th	Semi-finals (2022)

== See also ==
- 2026 SAFF U-20 Championship
- 2026 SAFF U-23 Championship
- 2026 SAFF Futsal Championship
- 2026 SAFF Club Championship
- 2026 SAFF U-17 Women's Championship
