= 2014 AFC U-16 Championship qualification =

Tournament details
- Host countries: Kuwait; Uzbekistan; Nepal; Jordan; Pakistan; Kyrgyzstan; Hong Kong; Laos; China; Malaysia
- Dates: 21–29 September 2013
- Teams: 43 (from 1 confederation)

Tournament statistics
- Matches played: 66
- Goals scored: 352 (5.33 per match)
- Top scorer(s): (North Korea) Jong Chang-Bom (6 goals)

The 2014 AFC U-16 Championship qualification was the qualification round for the 2014 AFC U-16 Championship, which took place in Thailand. The draw for the qualifiers was held on 26 April 2013 in Kuala Lumpur, Malaysia.

== Format ==
A total of 43 teams entered the qualification tournament and were drawn into ten groups of five or four teams. West Zone, containing teams from West Asia and South/Central Asia, had one group of five teams and five groups of four teams, while East Zone, containing teams from East Asia and ASEAN, had two groups of five teams and two groups of four teams. The teams were seeded according to their performance in the previous season in 2012. After playing each other once at a centralised venue, the ten group winners and best five runners-up from all groups qualified for the final tournament.

	Pot 1	Pot 2	Pot 3	Pot 4	Pot 5
West Zone (Groups A–F)	Iran Iraq Kuwait Oman Syria Uzbekistan	Bahrain India Qatar Saudi Arabia United Arab Emirates Yemen	Afghanistan Bangladesh (W) Nepal Pakistan Palestine Tajikistan	Jordan Kyrgyzstan Lebanon Maldives (W) Sri Lanka Turkmenistan	Bhutan
East Zone (Groups G–J)	Australia China Japan South Korea	Indonesia Laos North Korea Singapore	Hong Kong Malaysia Myanmar Vietnam	Chinese Taipei Guam Northern Mariana Islands Philippines	Brunei Macau

- Thailand automatically qualified for the finals as hosts.
- The following teams did not enter:
  - Cambodia
  - Mongolia
  - Timor-Leste

== Player eligibility ==
Players born on or after 1 January 1998 were eligible to compete in the qualification tournament.

== Tiebreakers ==
If two or more teams were equal on points on completion of the group matches, the following criteria were applied to determine the rankings.

1. Greater number of points obtained in the group matches between the teams concerned;
2. Goal difference resulting from the group matches between the teams concerned;
3. Greater number of goals scored in the group matches between the teams concerned;
4. Goal difference in all the group matches;
5. Greater number of goals scored in all the group matches;
6. Kicks from the penalty mark if only two teams are involved and they are both on the field of play;
7. Fewer score calculated according to the number of yellow and red cards received in the group matches;
8. Drawing of lots.

== Groups ==
=== Group A ===
- Matches were played in Kuwait (UTC+3).

Team	Pld	W	D	L	GF	GA	GD	Pts
Kuwait (H)	4	4	0	0	14	3	+11	12
Tajikistan	4	2	1	1	19	3	+16	7
Lebanon	4	2	0	2	6	12	−6	6
India	4	1	1	2	10	5	+5	4
Bhutan	4	0	0	4	3	29	−26	0

21 September 2013
16:50

Tajikistan	1–1	India
Saidov 36'	Report	Chakraborty 56' (pen.)

Ali Sabah Al-Salem Stadium, Kuwait City
Attendance: 70
Referee: Yaqoob Abdul Baki (Oman)
21 September 2013
20:50

Bhutan	2–4	Lebanon
Samten 90'; Ngawang 90+3' (pen.)	Report	Kharoubi 11'; Al Debek 32'; Abou Fakher 53'; Khayat 75'

Ali Sabah Al-Salem Stadium, Kuwait City
Attendance: 100
Referee: Aziz Asimov (Uzbekistan)

23 September 2013
16:50

Lebanon	1–5	Kuwait
Zein 7'	Report	Al-Enezi 5', 16'; Al-Bariki 43'; Al-Hadiyah 66'; Ahmad 90+1'

Ali Sabah Al-Salem Stadium, Kuwait City
Attendance: 200
Referee: Çarymyrat Gurbanow (Turkmenistan)
23 September 2013
20:50

Bhutan	0–12	Tajikistan
	Report	Khasanov 13'; Muhammadjoni 19', 27'; Tolibov 20', 49', 61'; Uzaqov 60'; Gulyakov 66', 67', 69', 89'; Malodustov 76'

Ali Sabah Al-Salem Stadium, Kuwait City
Attendance: 100
Referee: Khamis Al-Kuwari (Qatar)

25 September 2013
16:50

Kuwait	5–0	Bhutan
Al Enezi 10', 18'; Al Bariki 43', 76'; Al Sulaili 57'	Report

Ali Sabah Al-Salem Stadium, Kuwait City
Attendance: 120
Referee: Yaqoob Abdul Baki (Oman)
25 September 2013
20:50

India	0–1	Lebanon
	Report	Srour 58'

Ali Sabah Al-Salem Stadium, Kuwait City
Attendance: 200
Referee: Fahad Al-Mirdasi (Saudi Arabia)

27 September 2013
16:50

India	8–1	Bhutan
J. Singh 5'; Chakraborty 13', 31', 48'; Lalrinzuala 19'; B. Singh 42'; Lalrindika 73'; Nuruddin 76'	Report	Dorji 41'

Ali Sabah Al-Salem Stadium, Kuwait City
Attendance: 270
Referee: Çarymyrat Gurbanow (Turkmenistan)
27 September 2013
20:50

Tajikistan	1–2	Kuwait
Muhammadjoni 54'	Report	Al Naser 42'; Al Rashidi 90+1'

Ali Sabah Al-Salem Stadium, Kuwait City
Attendance: 250
Referee: Fahad Al-Mirdasi (Saudi Arabia)

29 September 2013
16:50

Lebanon	0–5	Tajikistan
	Report	Uzaqov 14', 33'; Muhammadjoni 16'; Tolibov 41'; Gulyakov 83'

Ali Sabah Al-Salem Stadium, Kuwait City
Attendance: 100
Referee: Khamis Al-Kuwari (Qatar)
29 September 2013
20:50

Kuwait	2–1	India
Khaled 9'; Salem 45+2' (pen.)	Report	Pandit 66'

Ali Sabah Al-Salem Stadium, Kuwait City
Attendance: 2,000
Referee: Aziz Asimov (Uzbekistan)

=== Group B ===
- Matches were played in Uzbekistan (UTC+5).

Team	Pld	W	D	L	GF	GA	GD	Pts
Uzbekistan (H)	2	2	0	0	13	0	+13	6
Yemen	2	1	0	1	3	5	−2	3
Palestine	2	0	0	2	1	12	−11	0
Maldives (W)	0	0	0	0	0	0	0	0

(W) Withdrew
25 September 2013
16:00

Yemen	3–1	Palestine
Ahmed 28'; Abdullah 52'; Yahya 55'	Report	Atout 78'

JAR Stadium, Tashkent
Attendance: 100
Referee: Masoud Tufayelieh (Syria)

27 September 2013
16:00

Palestine	0–9	Uzbekistan
	Report	Murtazaev 4'; Kuchimov 7', 26' (pen.); Nurulloev 50', 77'; Nurmatov 52'; Kurbonov 67'; Ganiev 83' (pen.), 90+2'

JAR Stadium, Tashkent
Attendance: 300
Referee: Hamad Al-Hashmi (United Arab Emirates)

29 September 2013
16:00

Uzbekistan	4–0	Yemen
Khuchimov 11', 52'; Jumaev 58'; Mahmudxojiyev 90+5'	Report

JAR Stadium, Tashkent
Attendance: 600
Referee: Pratap Singh (India)

=== Group C ===
- Matches were played in Nepal (UTC+5:45).

Team	Pld	W	D	L	GF	GA	GD	Pts
Nepal (H)	3	2	1	0	8	2	+6	7
Bahrain	3	2	0	1	5	4	+1	6
Iraq	3	1	1	1	11	5	+6	4
Turkmenistan	3	0	0	3	2	15	−13	0

25 September 2013
14:00

Iraq	8–1	Turkmenistan
Al-Msharrafawee 10', 59', 84' (pen.); Al-Shmailawi 68'; Tuaimah 78'; Gatea 80', 87'; Atiyah 90'	Report	Metdaýew 22'

Dasarath Rangasala Stadium, Kathmandu
Attendance: 1,000
Referee: Rowan Arumughan (India)
25 September 2013
17:00

Bahrain	0–2	Nepal
	Report	Bista 12'; Tamang 45+3'

Dasarath Rangasala Stadium, Kathmandu
Attendance: 4,400
Referee: Tayeb Shamsuzzaman (Bangladesh)

27 September 2013
14:00

Turkmenistan	1–3	Bahrain
Metdaýew 15'	Report	Jasim 12', 45+1'; Ameen 53'

Dasarath Rangasala Stadium, Kathmandu
Attendance: 500
Referee: Sgt. Win Cho (Myanmar)
27 September 2013
17:00

Nepal	2–2	Iraq
Magar 50'; Bista 70'	Report	Mahmood 15'; Khudhair 45+2'

Dasarath Rangasala Stadium, Kathmandu
Attendance: 4,500
Referee: Khurram Shahzad (Pakistan)

29 September 2013
14:00

Iraq	1–2	Bahrain
Abdulhadi 40'	Report	Jasim 9'; Naseem 14'

Dasarath Rangasala Stadium, Kathmandu
Attendance: 1,000
Referee: Tayeb Shamsuzzaman (Bangladesh)
29 September 2013
17:00

Nepal	4–0	Turkmenistan
Magar 45+2', 51', 82'; Rajbanshi 75'	Report

Dasarath Rangasala Stadium, Kathmandu
Attendance: 6,300
Referee: Khurram Shahzad (Pakistan)

=== Group D ===
- Matches were played in Jordan (UTC+3).

Team	Pld	W	D	L	GF	GA	GD	Pts
Saudi Arabia	3	2	1	0	4	1	+3	7
Syria	3	1	2	0	7	4	+3	5
Afghanistan	3	1	0	2	2	6	−4	3
Jordan (H)	3	0	1	2	6	8	−2	1

25 September 2013
15:30

Saudi Arabia	2–0	Afghanistan
Abu Shae 36' (pen.); Abdullah 70'	Report

Prince Mohammad International Stadium, Zarqa
Attendance: 50
Referee: Ahmed Aslam (Maldives)
25 September 2013
18:00

Syria	4–4	Jordan
Kibabi 38'; Barakat 53'; Mohamad Al-Hallak 73'; Jaddoua 89'	Report	Al-Maloukh 32'; Al-Jaafreh 43'; Obaid 80'; Tannous 90+2'

Amman International Stadium, Amman
Attendance: 215
Referee: Ali Shaban (Kuwait)

27 September 2013
15:30

Afghanistan	0–3	Syria
	Report	Jaddoua 69'; Al Hallak 89', 90+3'

Prince Mohammad International Stadium, Zarqa
Attendance: 52
Referee: Mukhtar Al Yarimi (Yemen)
27 September 2013
18:00

Jordan	1–2	Saudi Arabia
Abu Jalboush 42'	Report	Al-Salem 56'; Abu Shae 90+5'

Amman International Stadium, Amman
Attendance: 100
Referee: Naseer Ahmad Rana (Pakistan)

29 September 2013
15:30

Syria	0–0	Saudi Arabia
	Report

Prince Mohammad International Stadium, Zarqa
Attendance: 40
Referee: Ali Shaban (Kuwait)
29 September 2013
18:00

Afghanistan	2–1	Jordan
Waziri 50'; Mansory 67'	Report	Shdaifat 10'

Amman International Stadium, Amman
Attendance: 43
Referee: Ahmed Aslam (Maldives)

=== Group E ===
- Matches were played in Pakistan (UTC+6).

Team	Pld	W	D	L	GF	GA	GD	Pts
Iran	3	3	0	0	13	0	+13	9
United Arab Emirates	3	2	0	1	8	3	+5	6
Pakistan (H)	3	0	1	2	0	4	−4	1
Sri Lanka	3	0	1	2	0	14	−14	1

25 September 2013
16:00

Iran	8–0	Sri Lanka
Karimi 13', 25'; Darzi 30'; Shekari 37'; Dehghani 41'; Mokhtari 67', 85'; Khodadadi 68'	Report

Peoples Football Stadium, Karachi
Attendance: 2,500
Referee: Dmitriy Mashentsev (Kyrgyzstan)
25 September 2013
19:00

United Arab Emirates	2–0	Pakistan
Al-Matroushi 68'; Al-Otaiba 88'	Report

Peoples Football Stadium, Karachi
Attendance: 3,000
Referee: Jameel Abdulhusin (Bahrain)

27 September 2013
16:00

Pakistan	0–2	Iran
	Report	Mokhtari 30'; Shamsi 78'

Peoples Football Stadium, Karachi
Attendance: 1,500
Referee: Khamis Al-Marri (Qatar)
27 September 2013
19:00

Sri Lanka	0–6	United Arab Emirates
	Report	Al-Otaiba 2' (pen.); Yadoo 7', 66'; Al-Naqbi 23', 35', 59'

Peoples Football Stadium, Karachi
Attendance: 950
Referee: Taweel Feras (Syria)

29 September 2013
16:00

Iran	3–0	United Arab Emirates
Shekari 30'; Mokhtari 45+1', 47'	Report

Peoples Football Stadium, Karachi
Attendance: 4,100
Referee: Jameel Mohammed (Bahrain)
29 September 2013
19:00

Pakistan	0–0	Sri Lanka
	Report

Peoples Football Stadium, Karachi
Attendance: 2,500
Referee: Dmitriy Mashentsev (Kyrgyzstan)

=== Group F ===
- Matches were played in Kyrgyzstan (UTC+6).

Team	Pld	W	D	L	GF	GA	GD	Pts
Oman	2	1	1	0	7	6	+1	4
Qatar	2	1	0	1	7	7	0	3
Kyrgyzstan (H)	2	0	1	1	6	7	−1	1
Bangladesh (W)	0	0	0	0	0	0	0	0

(W) Withdrew
25 September 2013
16:30

Oman	3–3	Kyrgyzstan
Al-Siyabi 10', 76'; Al-Yahyaei 72'	Report	Ibraimov 31'; Batyrkanov 35'; Mambetaliev 89'

Spartak Stadium, Bishkek
Attendance: 2,500
Referee: Abdulshaheed Mohamed (Bahrain)

27 September 2013
16:30

Kyrgyzstan	3–4	Qatar
Almaz 34' (pen.); Al-Hitmi 54' (o.g.); Kadyrbek 87'	Report	Ahmed 5'; Al-Meghessib 15' (pen.); Palang 31', 90+1'

Spartak Stadium, Bishkek
Attendance: 4,000
Referee: Ali Sabah Adday Al-Qaysi (Iraq)

29 September 2013
16:30

Oman	4–3	Qatar
Al-Siyabi 33', 79', 86'; Al-Yahyaei 82'	Report	Sheban 55'; Ghaderi 90+4'; Al-Naimi 90+5'

Spartak Stadium, Bishkek
Attendance: 1,000
Referee: Mohammad Abu Loum (Jordan)

=== Group G ===
- Matches were played in Hong Kong (UTC+8).

Team	Pld	W	D	L	GF	GA	GD	Pts
Australia	4	4	0	0	26	2	+24	12
Hong Kong (H)	4	3	0	1	12	4	+8	9
Singapore	4	2	0	2	14	8	+6	6
Chinese Taipei	4	1	0	3	7	13	−6	3
Macau	4	0	0	4	1	33	−32	0

21 September 2013
10:30

Macau	0–5	Chinese Taipei
	Report	Yu Chia-huang 9', 62'; Tsou Yu-chieh 11'; Huang Jyun-wun 33'; Lan Hao-yu 41' (pen.)

Hong Kong Football Club Stadium, Hong Kong
Attendance: 100
Referee: Ko Hyung-Jin (South Korea)
21 September 2013
14:30

Hong Kong	4–1	Singapore
Ho Shing Yuen 2', 55'; Yu Wai Lim 27'; Ho Chik Hin 29'	Report	Zulqarnaen 74'

Hong Kong Football Club Stadium, Hong Kong
Attendance: 200
Referee: Yudai Yamamoto (Japan)

23 September 2013
14:30

Macau	0–5	Hong Kong
	Report	Cheng Chin Lung 24', 81'; Jordan Lam 42', 74' (pen.), 80'

Hong Kong Football Club Stadium, Hong Kong
Attendance: 150
Referee: Thong Chanketya (Cambodia)
24 September 2013
10:30

Chinese Taipei	0–7	Australia
	Report	Panetta 20'; Bandiera 23', 39', 61', 76'; Fotakopoulos 31'; Dimitroff 35'

Hong Kong Football Club Stadium, Hong Kong
Attendance: 150
Referee: Nivon Robesh Gamini (Sri Lanka)

25 September 2013
10:30

Australia	14–1	Macau
Reiners 4', 51'; D'Agostino 5', 31' (pen.); Devereux 15'; Stokes 17' de Godoy 19', 43'; Petratos 22', 82'; Kim 63'; Mendez 70'; Caletti 76'; Maskin 90+1'	Report	Vong Chak Man 56'

Hong Kong Football Club Stadium, Hong Kong
Attendance: 100
Referee: Thong Chanketya (Cambodia)
25 September 2013
14:30

Singapore	3–1	Chinese Taipei
Said 5', 42' (pen.); Onn 62'	Report	Huang Jyun-wun 68'

Hong Kong Football Club Stadium, Hong Kong
Attendance: 50
Referee: Ko Hyung-Jin (South Korea)

27 September 2013
10:30

Singapore	9–0	Macau
Muhammad Zulqarnaen 3', 18' (pen.); Anugrah 25'; Royston Tan Jia Jie 28', 34', 38'; Prakash Raj 45'; Muhd Syukri Bin Mohd Bashir 54', 61'	Report

Hong Kong Football Club Stadium, Hong Kong
Attendance: 50
Referee: Nivon Robesh Gamini (Sri Lanka)
27 September 2013
14:30

Hong Kong	0–2	Australia
	Report	D'Agostino 33'; Brimmer 39'

Hong Kong Football Club Stadium, Hong Kong
Attendance: 230
Referee: Yudai Yamamoto (Japan)

29 September 2013
10:30

Australia	3–1	Singapore
Devereux 13'; Panetta 16'; Bandiera 52' (pen.)	Report	Haiqal Anugerah 39'

Hong Kong Football Club Stadium, Hong Kong
Attendance: 50
Referee: Yudai Yamamoto (Japan)
29 September 2013
14:30

Chinese Taipei	1–3	Hong Kong
Hsieh Chun-ping 5'	Report	Ho Shing Yuen 20'; Cheng Chun Yin 43'; Jordan Lam 52'

Hong Kong Football Club Stadium, Hong Kong
Attendance: 240
Referee: Ko Hyung-Jin (South Korea)

=== Group H ===
- Matches were played in Laos (UTC+7).

Team	Pld	W	D	L	GF	GA	GD	Pts
Malaysia	4	3	1	0	24	1	+23	10
South Korea	4	3	0	1	26	3	+23	9
Laos (H)	4	2	1	1	14	5	+9	7
Brunei	4	1	0	3	4	21	−17	3
Guam	4	0	0	4	1	39	−38	0

21 September 2013
15:00

Brunei	4–1	Guam
Nazirrudin 16'; Syahmi 38', 42', 73'	Report	Benito 27'

New Laos National Stadium, Vientiane
Attendance: 150
Referee: Timur Faizullin (Kyrgyzstan)
21 September 2013
18:00

Malaysia	1–1	Laos
Ahmad 80'	Report	Sinthanong 88'

New Laos National Stadium, Vientiane
Attendance: 1,000
Referee: Ma Ning (China)

23 September 2013
15:00

Brunei	0–8	Malaysia
	Report	Najmuddin 4'; Ishyra 35' (o.g.); Shahrul 40'; Kogileswaran 44', 85'; Shyamierul 65'; Ashraf 73'; Najib 90+2'

New Laos National Stadium, Vientiane
Attendance: 100
Referee: Vo Minh Tri (Vietnam)
23 September 2013
18:00

Guam	0–13	South Korea
	Report	Jo Sang-hyun 3', 66', 90+2'; Park Myeong-su 11'; Lee Sang-heon 24'; Lee Yeon-gyu 33', 49', 85'; Kang Sang-hee 37', 45'; Lee Yon-geon 40'; You Ju-an 54'; Kim Ho 81'

New Laos National Stadium, Vientiane
Attendance: 300
Referee: Sukhbir Singh (Singapore)

25 September 2013
15:00

South Korea	9–0	Brunei
Yuk Geun-Hyeouk 8', 77', 89'; Lee Hyeong-Kyeong 26', 43', 90+1'; You Juan 37'; Park Dae-Won 50'; Jang Gyeol-Hee 73'	Report

New Laos National Stadium, Vientiane
Attendance: 250
Referee: Ma Ning (China)
25 September 2013
18:00

Laos	9–0	Guam
Laithaya 13'; Sinthanong 21', 52'; Hatsady 28', 65', 69', 74'; Lathasay 50'; Maitee 78'	Report

New Laos National Stadium, Vientiane
Attendance: 2,000
Referee: Md Mizanur Rahman (Bangladesh)

27 September 2013
15:00

Malaysia	2–0	South Korea
Najmuddin 45+1'; Ashraf 61'	Report

New Laos National Stadium, Vientiane
Attendance: 300
Referee: Timur Faizullin (Kyrgyzstan)
27 September 2013
18:00

Laos	3–0	Brunei
Aphixay 24'; Soulivanh 36'; Salath 84'	Report

New Laos National Stadium, Vientiane
Attendance: 2,500
Referee: Vo Minh Tri (Vietnam)

29 September 2013
15:00

Guam	0–13	Malaysia
	Report	Shahfizam 6'; Najmuddin 9', 16', 48'; Firdaus 14', 68'; Najib 22', 23', 63'; Kogi 57' (pen.); Abang 78', 80', 90+1'

New Laos National Stadium, Vientiane
Attendance: 500
Referee: Md Mizanur Rahman (Bangladesh)
29 September 2013
18:00

South Korea	4–1	Laos
Lee Seung-Woo 2', 18', 34', 75'	Report	Laithaya 90+3'

New Laos National Stadium, Vientiane
Attendance: 3,000
Referee: Sukhbir Singh (Singapore)

=== Group I ===
- Matches were played in China (UTC+8).

Team	Pld	W	D	L	GF	GA	GD	Pts
North Korea	3	2	1	0	21	0	+21	7
China (H)	3	2	1	0	16	1	+15	7
Myanmar	3	1	0	2	6	5	+1	3
Northern Mariana Islands	3	0	0	3	0	37	−37	0

25 September 2013
15:30

North Korea	3–0	Myanmar
Jong Chang-Bom 62', 72'; Han Kwang-Song 70'	Report

Hankou Cultural Sports Centre, Wuhan
Attendance: 60
Referee: Yu Ming-hsun (Chinese Taipei)
25 September 2013
19:35

China	14–0	Northern Mariana Islands
Zhang Huachen 4' (pen.), 39', 69'; Duan Liuyu 6', 11', 38'; Nie Meng 16'; Liu Ruofan 29', 45+2', 58'; Gong Chunjie 61'; Zhou Shengzhi 64'; Lin Zefeng 77'; Xie Zhiwei 82'	Report

Hankou Cultural Sports Centre, Wuhan
Attendance: 100
Referee: Kim Dae-yong (South Korea)

27 September 2013
15:30

Northern Mariana Islands	0–18	North Korea
	Report	Jong Chang-Bom 3', 20', 55', 67'; Kim Ye-Bom 4', 10', 28', 51'; Han Kwang-Song 6'; Yon Jun-Hyok 24', 45', 45+2', 69'; O Chung-Guk 26', 72'; Choe Jin-Nam 75', 76'; Kim Jin-Hyok 90+3'

Hankou Cultural Sports Centre, Wuhan
Attendance: 60
Referee: Hiroyoshi Takayama (Japan)
27 September 2013
19:35

Myanmar	1–2	China
Shwe Ko 61'	Report	Liu Ruofan 22'; Duan Liuyu 79'

Hankou Cultural Sports Centre, Wuhan
Attendance: 200
Referee: Kim Dae-yong (South Korea)

29 September 2013
15:30

Myanmar	5–0	Northern Mariana Islands
Soe Moe Tun 37'; Kyaw Zin Oo 45+1' (pen.); Zwe Thet Paing 51', 76'; Sann Thu Aung 61'	Report

Hankou Cultural Sports Centre, Wuhan
Attendance: 50
Referee: Dinh Van Dung (Vietnam)
29 September 2013
19:35

China	0–0	North Korea
	Report

Hankou Cultural Sports Centre, Wuhan
Attendance: 300
Referee: Hiroyoshi Takayama (Japan)

=== Group J ===
- Matches were played in Malaysia (UTC+8).

Team	Pld	W	D	L	GF	GA	GD	Pts
Japan	3	3	0	0	14	1	+13	9
Vietnam	3	2	0	1	6	3	+3	6
Indonesia	3	0	1	2	1	5	−4	1
Philippines	3	0	1	2	0	12	−12	1

25 September 2013
17:00

Japan	9–0	Philippines
Akama 33', 40', 45', 48', 81'; Sugiura 37'; Kato 57'; Koga 67'; Onozawa 86'	Report

Kuala Lumpur Stadium, Kuala Lumpur
Attendance: 80
Referee: Suhaizi Shukri (Malaysia)
25 September 2013
20:00

Indonesia	1–2	Vietnam
Riyanto 89'	Report	Phạm Trọng Hóa 10' (pen.), 82'

Kuala Lumpur Stadium, Kuala Lumpur
Attendance: 100
Referee: Wang Di (China PR)

27 September 2013
17:00

Vietnam	1–2	Japan
Phạm Trọng Hóa 70'	Report	Iyoha 33'; Shimoguchi 86'

Kuala Lumpur Stadium, Kuala Lumpur
Attendance: 80
Referee: Jarred Gillett (Australia)
27 September 2013
20:00

Philippines	0–0	Indonesia
	Report

Kuala Lumpur Stadium, Kuala Lumpur
Attendance: 50
Referee: Ashkan Khorshidi (Iran)

29 September 2013
17:00

Japan	3–0	Indonesia
Watanabe 52'; Doan 61', 67'	Report

Kuala Lumpur Stadium, Kuala Lumpur
Attendance: 80
Referee: Wang Di (China PR)
29 September 2013
20:00

Vietnam	3–0	Philippines
Lê Tiến Anh 28'; Nguyễn Văn Huy 68'; Hoàng Thế Tài 90'	Report

Kuala Lumpur Stadium, Kuala Lumpur
Attendance: 40
Referee: Suhaizi Shukri (Malaysia)

== Ranking of second-placed teams ==
In order to ensure equality when comparing the runners-up team of all the groups, the results of the matches between the runner-up team and the bottom-placed team (for Group C, D, E, I and J, which consist of four teams) or two sides from the bottom (for Group A, G and H, which consists of five teams) were considered null and void due to Groups B and F having only three teams participating in the qualifiers.

The best runner-up teams among those ranked second in the groups were determined as follows:

1. Greater number of points obtained from group matches
2. Goal difference resulting from group matches
3. Greater number of goals scored in group matches
4. Fewer number of points calculated according to the number of yellow and red cards received by the team in the group matches
5. Drawing of lots.

Grp	Team	Pld	W	D	L	GF	GA	GD	Pts
D	Syria	2	1	1	0	3	0	+3	4
I	China	2	1	1	0	2	1	+1	4
G	Hong Kong	2	1	0	1	4	3	+1	3
H	South Korea	2	1	0	1	4	3	+1	3
F	Qatar	2	1	0	1	7	7	0	3
J	Vietnam	2	1	0	1	3	3	0	3
E	United Arab Emirates	2	1	0	1	2	3	−1	3
C	Bahrain	2	1	0	1	2	3	−1	3
B	Yemen	2	1	0	1	3	5	−2	3
A	Tajikistan	2	0	1	1	2	3	−1	1

== Qualified teams ==
- Australia
- China
- Hong Kong
- Iran
- Japan
- Kuwait
- Malaysia
- Nepal
- North Korea
- Oman
- Qatar
- Saudi Arabia
- South Korea
- Syria
- Thailand (hosts)
- Uzbekistan
