= 2023 SAFF U-16 Championship =

Tournament details
- Host country: Bhutan
- Dates: 2–10 September 2023
- Teams: 6 (from 1 sub-confederation)
- Venue: 1 (in 1 host city)

Final positions
- Champions: India (5th title)
- Runners-up: Bangladesh

Tournament statistics
- Matches played: 9
- Goals scored: 27 (3 per match)
- Attendance: 16,475 (1,831 per match)
- Top scorer(s): (India) Md Arbash (3 goals)
- Best player: (India) Md Arbash
- Best goalkeeper: (India) Suraj Singh
- Fair play award: Pakistan

The 2023 SAFF U-16 Championship was the eighth edition of the SAFF U-16 Championship, an international football competition for men's under-17 national teams organized by South Asian Football Federation (SAFF). It was played from 2–10 September 2023 in Thimphu, Bhutan.

India are the defending champions, who won their fifth title in 2023 by defeating Bangladesh in the final. Pakistan were given the fair play award.

== Venue ==
All matches were held at the Changlimithang Stadium in Thimphu, Bhutan.

Thimphu
Changlimithang Stadium
Capacity: 15,000
Thimphu is located in Bhutan

== Teams ==
Sri Lanka are ineligible for participation as they are suspended by FIFA. Other six SAFF teams are eligible to participate.

Team	Appearances in the SAFF U-16 Championship	Previous best performance
Bangladesh	8th	Winners (2015, 2018)
Bhutan (Host)	6th	Fourth place (2017)
India	8th	Winners (2013, 2017, 2019, 2022)
Maldives	6th	Group stage (2011, 2015, 2017, 2018, 2022)
Nepal	8th	Runners-up (2013, 2017, 2019, 2022)
Pakistan	4th	Winners (2011)

=== Draw ===
The draw was held in BFF House in Dhaka, Bangladesh on 22 July 2023 at 12:00 BST (UTC+6).

Pot 1	Pot 2	Pot 3
Bhutan (hosts); India	Nepal; Maldives	Bangladesh; Pakistan

==== Draw result ====
Group A
Pos	Team
A1	India
A2	Nepal
A3	Bangladesh

Group B
Pos	Team
B1	Bhutan
B2	Maldives
B3	Pakistan

== Match officials ==
Referees

- (Bangladesh) Md. Nasir Uddin
- (Bhutan) Penjor Ugyen
- (Nepal) Kabin Byanjankar
- (Maldives) Zaheer Hussain
- (India) Senthil Nathan Sekaran

Assistant referees

- (Nepal) Sunwar Hem Kumar
- (Nepal) Madhav Khatri
- (Bangladesh) Bikash Sarker
- (Pakistan) Raeef Rauf
- (India) B. Nagoorkani

== Players eligibility ==
Players born on or after 1 January 2007 are eligible to compete in the tournament. Each team has to register a squad of minimum 16 players and maximum 23 players, minimum two of whom must be goalkeepers.

== Group stage ==
- Times listed are UTC+06:00 Bhutan Time.

Key to colours in group tables
Group winners and runners-up advance to the semi-finals

Tiebreakers

Teams are ranked according to points (3 points for a win, 1 point for a draw, 0 points for a loss), and if tied on points, the following tiebreaking criteria are applied, in the order given, to determine the rankings.

1. Points in head-to-head matches among tied teams;
2. Goal difference in head-to-head matches among tied teams;
3. Goals scored in head-to-head matches among tied teams;
4. If more than two teams are tied, and after applying all head-to-head criteria above, a subset of teams are still tied, all head-to-head criteria above are reapplied exclusively to this subset of teams;
5. Goal difference in all group matches;
6. Goals scored in all group matches;
7. Penalty shoot-out if only two teams are tied and they met in the last round of the group;
8. Disciplinary points (yellow card = 1 point, red card as a result of two yellots, direct red card = 3 points, yellow card followed by direct red card = 4 points);
9. Drawing of lots.

=== Group A ===
Pos	Team	Pld	W	D	L	GF	GA	GD	Pts	Qualification
1	India	2	2	0	0	2	0	+2	6	Qualified for Knockout stage
2	Bangladesh	2	1	0	1	1	1	0	3	Qualified for Knockout stage
3	Nepal	2	0	0	2	0	2	−2	0	

Source: GSA
2 September 2023
15:00

Bangladesh	0–1	India
	Report	Thoungamba Singh 75'

Changlimithang Stadium, Thimphu
Attendance: 720
Referee: Penjor Ugyen (Bhutan)

4 September 2023
19:00

Nepal	0–1	Bangladesh
	Report	Md Ashikur Rahman 47'

Changlimithang Stadium, Thimphu
Attendance: 0
Referee: Zaheer Hussain (Maldives)

6 September 2023
15:00

India	1–0	Nepal
Md. Arbash 33'	Report

Changlimithang Stadium, Thimphu
Attendance: 545
Referee: Zaheer Hussain (Maldives)

=== Group B ===
Pos	Team	Pld	W	D	L	GF	GA	GD	Pts	Qualification
1	Pakistan	2	2	0	0	5	1	+4	6	Qualified for Knockout stage
2	Maldives	2	1	0	1	3	5	−2	3	Qualified for Knockout stage
3	Bhutan (H)	2	0	0	2	3	5	−2	0	

Source: GSA
(H) Hosts
2 September 2023
19:00

Pakistan	2–1	Bhutan
Ubaidullah Khan 17'; Subhan Karim 30'	Report	Tandin Phuntsho 13'

Changlimithang Stadium, Thimphu
Attendance: 4,500
Referee: Md. Nasir Uddin (Bangladesh)

4 September 2023
15:00

Maldives	0–3	Pakistan
	Report	Subhan Karim 14'; Abdul Samad 39'; Ahmed Mifzal 51' (o.g.)

Changlimithang Stadium, Thimphu
Attendance: 200
Referee: Kabin Byanjankar (Nepal)

6 September 2023
17:30

Bhutan	2–3	Maldives
Sonam Dorji 42', 45+3'	Report	Mohamed Ilan Imran 4'; Kingyel Wancchuk Dorji 45+5' (o.g.); Ethan Ibrahim Zaki 71'

Changlimithang Stadium, Thimphu
Attendance: 5,100
Referee: Senthil Nathan Sekaran (India)

== Knockout stage ==
=== Bracket ===
Semi-finals
8 September – Thimphu
India	8
Maldives	0
8 September – Thimphu
Pakistan	1
Bangladesh	2

Final
10 September – Thimphu
India	2
Bangladesh	0

=== Semi-finals ===
8 September 2023
13:30

India	8–0	Maldives
Vishal Yadav 22'; Mohammed Kaif 36'; Levis Zangminlun 53'; Airborlang Kharthangmaw 62', 82'; Manbha Kupar Malngiang 70'; Md Arbash 77', 84'	Report

Changlimithang Stadium, Thimphu
Attendance: 260
Referee: Kabin Byanjankar (Nepal)
8 September 2023
17:30

Pakistan	1–2	Bangladesh
Abdul Ghani 6'	Report	Mursed Ali 14'; Md Abu Sayed 29'

Changlimithang Stadium, Thimphu
Attendance: 450
Referee: Penjor Ugyen (Bhutan)

=== Final ===
10 September 2023
18:00

India	2–0	Bangladesh
Bharat Lairenjam 9'; Levis Zangminlun 74'	Report

Changlimithang Stadium, Thimphu
Attendance: 4,700
Referee: Zaheer Hussain (Maldives)

== Winner ==
8th SAFF U-16 Championship 2023 Champions

India
Fifth title

== Awards ==
The following awards were given at the conclusion of the tournament:

Fair Play Award	Goalkeeper	Golden Boot Award
Pakistan	(India) Suraj Singh	(India) Md Arbas

== Statistics ==
=== Goalscorers ===
There were 29 goals scored in 10 matches, for an average of 2.9 goals per match.

3 goals

- (India) Md Arbash

2 goals

- (Pakistan) Subhan Karim
- (Bhutan) Sonam Dorji
- (India) Airborlang Kharthangmaw
- (India) Levis Zangminlun

1 goal

- (Bangladesh) Md Ashikur Rahman
- (Bangladesh) Mursed Ali
- (Bangladesh) Md Abu Sayed
- (India) Bharat Lairenjam
- (India) Thougngamba Singh Usham
- (India) Vishal Yadav
- (India) Md Kaif
- (India) Manbha Kupar Malngiang
- (Bhutan) Tandin Phuntsho
- (Pakistan) Ubaidullah Khan
- (Pakistan) Abdul Samad
- (Pakistan) Abdul Ghani
- (Maldives) Mohamed Ilan Imran
- (Maldives) Ethan Ibrahim Zaki

1 own goal

- (Maldives) Ahmed Mifzal (against Pakistan)
- (Bhutan) Kingyel Wancchuk Dorji (against Maldives)

Source: GSA

== See also ==
2023 in SAFF
Men's
U-16 Championship	U-19 Championship	Senior Championship (Final)
Women's
U-17 Championship	U-20 Championship	
