= Sajjad Mehmood =

Pakistani football manager

Personal information
- Full name: Sajjad Mehmood Khan
- Place of birth: Rawalpindi, Pakistan

Managerial career
- Years: Team
- 2006–2010: Khan Research Laboratories
- 2008: Pakistan (assistant)
- 2011: Pakistan U16
- 2011–2015: KRL (assistant)
- 2013: Pakistan U16
- 2015–2021: Khan Research Laboratories
- 2018: Pakistan (assistant)
- 2023: Pakistan U16
- 2024: Pakistan U17

Sajjad Mehmood Khan (Urdu: سجاد محمود خان) is a Pakistani football manager. He is best known for his long association with Khan Research Laboratories, where he won multiple national titles across two spells as head coach, and for leading Pakistan national youth teams, including Pakistan's first SAFF U-16 Championship triumph in 2011.

== Career ==
In 2006, Mehmood represented KRL as one of the attendees for the AFC B Certificate course in Lahore. In 2007, he was member of the coaching staff of Pakistan under-19 team. In 2008, he served as assistant coach of the Pakistan national team under Akhtar Mohiuddin for the 2008 SAFF Championship.

Under Mehmood, KRL won its first ever Pakistan Premier League title in 2009, and also captured the 2009 National Football Challenge Cup.

In July 2011 Mehmood was appointed head coach of Pakistan U-16 for the inaugural 2011 SAFF U-16 Championship in Nepal. Pakistan defeated India 2–1 in the final to win the title.

KRL hired Tariq Lutfi in April 2011, with Mehmood becoming assistant coach of the side. He also returned to lead Pakistan U-16 at the 2013 SAFF U-16 Championship.

After Lutfi's departure, Mehmood was again promoted from assistant to head coach. He promptly won the 2015 NBP National Challenge Cup, then retained the 2016 Pakistan Football Federation Cup, and later steered KRL to the 2018–19 Pakistan Premier League, a record fifth for the club.

In April 2018, he was appointed Director Competitions of the Pakistan Football Federation while serving as Pakistan national team assistant coach. He later resigned from the competitions role in November 2018.

He served again as head coach of youth team at the 2023 SAFF U-16 Championship, and then the 2024 SAFF U-17 Championship.

In 2023 along with youth coaches, he ran the senior Pakistan national team camp ahead of 2026 FIFA World Cup qualifiers prior to Stephen Constantine's arrival.

== Honours ==
=== Khan Research Laboratories ===
- Pakistan Premier League: 2009–10, 2018–19
- Pakistan National Football Challenge Cup: 2009, 2010, 2016
- NBP President's Cup: 2017

=== Pakistan U16 ===
- SAFF U-16 Championship: 2011
