= Bhutan national under-17 football team =

National youth association football team

Bhutan U-17
- Association: Bhutan Football Federation (BFF)
- Confederation: AFC (Asia)
- Sub-confederation: SAFF (South Asia)
- Home stadium: Changlimithang Stadium
- FIFA code: BHU
First colours	Second colours

First international
- Sri Lanka 3–0 Bhutan (Uzbekistan; 31 October 2003)

Biggest win
- Bhutan 6–0 Sri Lanka (Lalitpur, Nepal; 21 August 2017)

Biggest defeat
- Bhutan 0–12 Tajikistan (Kuwait City, Kuwait; 23 September 2013)

AFC U-17 Asian Cup
- Appearances: 0

SAFF U-17 Championship
- Appearances: 8 (first in 2013)
- Best result: 4th place (2017)

The Bhutan national under-17 football team represents Bhutan in men's international under-17 football. The team is controlled by the governing body for football in Bhutan, the Bhutan Football Federation, a member of the Asian Football Federation and the regional body the South Asian Football Federation. The under-17 team has played sporadically since its first foray into international football in 2004, competing exclusively either in the qualifying rounds for the AFC U-17 Asian Cup or the SAFF U-17 Championship. They are one of the weakest teams in their age group within both their continental and regional federations, having never qualified for the competition proper of the AFC U-16 Championship. They have played only nineteen competitive games in their entire history, losing eighteen of them, their only result coming in the form of a 0–0 draw with Pakistan in the 2013 SAFF U-16 Championship, conceding 102 goals along the way whilst scoring only seven in reply.

== History ==
Bhutan under-17s, much like the senior side came to international football relatively late. Although formal competition organized by the continental federation for this age group only commenced in 1985, Bhutan did not take part until 2004 when they entered the qualification rounds for the 2004 AFC U-17 Championship following three consecutive withdrawals from the qualifying competition in 1998, 2000 and 2002. Following this somewhat stuttering entry into the international arena, they travelled to Uzbekistan where their group games were to be played, but met with little success, failing to qualify and returning home without a point, or even scoring, losing 3–0 to Sri Lanka and then 6–0 to hosts Uzbekistan.

The team did not compete in the qualifying rounds of the next edition of the tournament but returned to continental competition two years later entering the qualifying rounds of the 2008 edition. This time the team travelled to Saudi Arabia, where all their group's matches were to be played. Their break from international football had not helped the team progress, as they lost their opening two matches 4–0 to Saudi Arabia and 1–0 to Sri Lanka. Their third match was to be their worst performance to that point, an 11-0 thrashing at the hands of Iraq. Although they continued in this vein, losing their next group game as well, they recorded their first ever competitive goal at the sixth time of asking in a 4–1 defeat to Lebanon, Thinley Dorji scoring a consolation goal for Bhutan in injury time at the end of the game. They were however unable to build on this, losing their final group game to India 4–0, to return home pointless for the second time.

For the first time in their history Bhutan competed in two consecutive editions of the AFC U-17 Championship qualifying rounds, travelling to Sana'a in Yemen for another round of five matches in their attempt to qualify for the 2010 AFC U-16 Championship. Their campaign got off to a terrible start, as they nearly eclipsed their unenviable record defeat suffered in the previous edition against Iraq, losing 10–0 in their opening match to Syria. The team recovered somewhat though in their next game, a narrow 2–1 defeat to Palestine, Chencho Gyeltshen putting Bhutan in front for the first time in any competitive match with only their second competitive goal in their history after just over a quarter of an hour, only to see Ashraf Nababta equalise ten minutes later. It looked as though Bhutan might hold on for a draw and their first ever positive result until Nababta scored his second of the game for Palestine in the eighty-third minute to claim all three points. The following two games saw Bhutan concede seven goals to both hosts Yemen and Iraq, although Dawa Tshering was able to convert a penalty on the stroke of half-time and the six goal margin was a considerable improvement on the scoreline the last time the two teams met. However, for the third time in three attempts Bhutan returned home without a point, albeit the two goals they scored represented their best attacking performance in competition to that point.

After missing the qualifying tournament for the 2012 AFC U-16 Championship, Bhutan's next foray into international football was the second edition of the SAFF U-16 Championship. Hosted by himalayan neighbour Nepal, the team's first performance in a regional international competition was their best to date. Their opening match against the hosts in the tournament's opening fixture at the Dasarath Rangasala Stadium in Kathmandu started promisingly as Bhutan went in at half time with the game scoreless. However they were unable to keep up their level of performance and conceded seven goals in the second half, with Bimal Magar and his namesake Hemant Magar both scoring hat-tricks. Bhutan's next match in the competition was arguably their greatest performance to date, as they secured their first ever positive result at the fourteenth time of asking in a 0–0 draw with Pakistan, despite being put under immense pressure from the Pakistanis in the second half. They were unable to build on this draw in their final game, losing 3–1 to Afghanistan Tenzin Shezang gave Bhutan the lead in the nineteenth minute although Afghanistan equalised through Atiqulallah Waziri to take the two teams into the break level. A further two goals in the second half from Nasir Ahmad consigned Bhutan to defeat and confirmed that Afghanistan would progress to the knock-out stages whilst Bhutan would go home.

Two months later the under-17 team travelled to Kuwait for the qualifying rounds of the 2014 AFC U-16 Championship. An opening 4–2 defeat to Lebanon was lent some respectability with two goals in injury time at the end of the game from Samten Norbu and Nawang Tshering, marking the first time in their history that the team had managed to score more than a single goal in a game. The remainder of the tournament was entirely forgettable for Bhutan. Their next match against Tajikistan resulted in a record 12–0 defeat, Tajik forward Rustam Tolibov scored a hat trick in the first hour, only to be replaced by fellow forward Sobirdzhon Gulyakov, who went on to score a further four goals himself in the remaining thirty minutes. The remaining two games saw further heavy defeats for Bhutan, 5–0 against the hosts Kuwait and 8–1 against India. This meant that for the fourth time in four attempts, Bhutan not only failed to qualify for the competition proper, but returned home without a single point. The only positive note to take from the tournament was Yoesel Dorji's goal against India meant that their three goals in total was their best ever attacking performance in any competition to date.

== Technical staff ==
Staff
Head coach	
Assistant coach	(Bhutan) Sonam Dhendup
Goalkeeping coach	(Bhutan) Tshering Dendup
Physiotherapist	(Bhutan) Chhador Zangmo
Team manager	(Bhutan) Dilli Ram Adhikari

== Players ==
=== Current Squad ===
The following 23 players were called up for the most recent fixtures in the 2026 AFC U-17 Asian Cup qualification.

No.	Pos.	Player	Date of birth (age)	Club
1	GK	Tashi Yonten		
21	GK	Sherab Dorji		
23	GK	Karma Jigsel		
2	MF	Tshendu Jamtsho		
3	MF	Rigsel Tshewang Sonam		
4	MF	Deychog Drakar Dorji (captain)		
5	MF	Kuenzang Rigzin Gyeltshen		
6	MF	Tenzin Namgyel		
8	MF	Ngawang Norbu		
9	MF	Yonten Tharchen		
10	MF	Dhendup Gyeltshen		
11	MF	Tashi Gyeltshen		
12	MF	Karma Yeshe Thabkhe		
13	MF	Pema Gyatsho Tshering		
14	MF	Thinley Dhendup Dorji		
15	MF	Tandin Tshering Wangdi		
16	MF	Ugyen Sethsum Namygel		
17	MF	Romee Rai		
18	MF	Lhawang Ningjay Tshering		
19	MF	Jurmeth Wangdi Norbu		
20	MF	Chagdor Wangchuk		
22	MF	Jamyang Lhendup Choda		
7	FW	Sayon Lama	13 January 2009 (age 17)	

== Competitive history ==
=== AFC U-17 Asian Cup ===
AFC U-17 Asian Cup record
Host/Year	Result	Position	Pld	W	D*	L	GF	GA
(Qatar) 1985	Did not qualify							
(Qatar) 1986	Did not qualify							
(Thailand) 1988	Did not qualify							
(United Arab Emirates) 1990	Did not qualify							
(Saudi Arabia) 1992	Did not qualify							
(Qatar) 1994	Did not qualify							
(Thailand) 1996	Did not qualify							
(Qatar) 1998	Did not qualify							
(Vietnam) 2000	Did not qualify							
(United Arab Emirates) 2002	Did not qualify							
(Japan) 2004	Did not qualify							
(Singapore) 2006	Did not qualify							
(Uzbekistan) 2008	Did not qualify							
(Uzbekistan) 2010	Did not qualify							
(Iran) 2012	Did not qualify							
(Thailand) 2014	Did not qualify							
(India) 2016	Did not qualify							
(Malaysia) 2018	Did not qualify							
(Bahrain) 2020	Did not qualify							
(Thailand) 2023	Did not qualify							
(Saudi Arabia) 2025	Did not qualify							
Total	0/21	0 titles	0	0	0	0	0	0

=== SAFF U-15 Championship ===
SAFF U-17 Championship record
Host/Year	Result	Position	Pld	W	D*	L	GF	GA
(Nepal) 2011	Did not enter							
(Nepal) 2013	Group stage		3	0	1	2	1	10
(Bangladesh) 2015	Did not enter							
(Nepal) 2017	Semifinal	4th	4	1	0	3	6	14
(Nepal) 2018	Group stage		2	0	0	2	0	8
(India) 2019	Group stage	5th	4	0	0	4	4	20
(Sri Lanka) 2022	Group stage		2	0	0	2	1	5
Total	5/7	0 titles	15	1	1	13	12	57

*Denotes draws includes knockout matches decided on penalty kicks. Red border indicates that the tournament was hosted on home soil. Beige background indicates 4th place finish.

== Honours ==
- SAFF U-17 Championship
  - 4th place: SAFF U-15
- UEFA ASSIST U-15 International Tournament
  - Runners-up: 🥈 UEFA ASSIST U-15 International Tournament
