= Pakistan national under-17 football team =

National association football team

Pakistan Under-17
- Nickname: Green Boys
- Association: Pakistan Football Federation
- Confederation: AFC (Asia)
- Sub-confederation: SAFF (South Asia)
- Head coach: Muhammad Habib
- FIFA code: PAK
First colours	Second colours

First international
- Pakistan 1–1 Maldives (Kathmandu, Nepal; July 1992)

Biggest win
- Guam 0–11 Pakistan (Besh-Kungoy, Kyrgyzstan; 30 November 2025)

Biggest defeat
- Indonesia 25–0 Pakistan (Tehran, Iran; 28 October 2012)

AFC U-17 Asian Cup
- Appearances: 1 (first in 2002)
- Best result: Group Stage (2002)

SAFF U-17 Championship
- Appearances: 6 (first in 2011)
- Best result: Champions (2011)
Medal record
SAFF Championship
Gold medal – first place	2011 Nepal
Silver medal – second place	2018 Nepal

The Pakistan national under-17 football team is a youth football team operated under the Pakistan Football Federation. The team represents Pakistan in the AFC U-17 Asian Cup and the SAFF U-17 Championship, winning the latter's inaugural edition, and is yet to qualify for the FIFA U-17 World Cup.

== History ==
=== 1990s ===
In February 1992, Pakistan competed in the Coca Cola U-16 Cup in Thailand. Pakistan participated in the AFC U-16 Championship for the first time in 1992, finishing fourth in their five-team group at Rajshahi Stadium in Bangladesh in May 1992. The clash between Pakistan and Maldives ended in a 1–1 draw. In the 24th minute midfielder Mohammad Ayub scored for Pakistan until Maldives fought back and their striker Ahmad Saleh levelled the game. India beat Pakistan 2–0 in the second match. The Pakistanis played with 10 players when the referee sent right back Adeel Sarfraz Butt off in the 59th minute. Ajoy Singh scored first and the second goal came from a penalty in the 70th by Prosunjit Paul. Host Bangladesh booted Pakistan out of the tournament defeating them by one goal to nil, the solitary goal, netted by right winger Jahangir five minutes before the final whistle. Pakistan lost to Nepal 0–1 in their last match. Nepal's stopper back Gambir Rai scored the lone goal in the ninth minute from a penalty.

=== 2000s ===
Pakistan along with Yemen fielded eight and four overage players respectively at the 2002 AFC U-17 Championship after passing the qualifying round, and were fined and suspended for taking part in the next 2004 AFC U-17 Championship after the discovery.

=== 2010s ===
Pakistan participated in the inaugural SAFF U-16 Championship held in Kathmandu, Nepal in 2011 with Sajjad Mehmood as the head coach, Hassan Baloch as manager and Munir Aftab as the captain. It beat India 1–0 in its first match, before winning 6–0 versus Maldives to reach the semi-finals. Two late goals helped it beat Bangladesh, and thus qualify for the final, in which it beat India 2–1 to win the tournament. Mohammad Bilal was the tournament's top goalscorer with 4 goals, while striker Mansoor Khan was declared the tournament's best player. Overall, Pakistan scored 11 goals and conceded only one.

In September 2011 for its AFC U-16 Championship qualification campaign, the team retained the same 22-player squad that had won the previous year's SAFF U-16 Championship. It finished fourth in its six-team group, securing wins against Maldives (4–0) and Afghanistan (3–1), but losing against Kuwait (0–2), United Arab Emirates (0–2), and Yemen (0–4).

In March 2012, the Pakistan national under-16 team then participated in the 2012 KPT Challenge Cup as "National Youth B". Drawn into a group with senior teams WAPDA and Pakistan Navy, the young team lost 0–3 against the former, and 0–2 against the latter. In May, it participated in the National Under-22 Football Championship, where it drew 0–0 against Baloch Nushki and 1–1 against Sindh, thus topping group B. In the semi-finals, the youth team lost 0–2 against Pakistan Army. In July 2012, three under-16 players went to Abu Dhabi for a month-long training camp at the Manchester United Soccer Schools.

The under-16 team participated in the 2013 SAFF U-16 Championship held in Nepal, where it was eliminated in the group stage after finishing third in its group after 0–0 draws against both Afghanistan and Bhutan, and a 0–3 loss to Nepal. Sajjad Mehmood was the coach for these fixtures.

The team withdrew from the 2015 SAFF U-16 Championship due to conflicts among the government and the Pakistan Football Federation.

In October 2018, the under-15 team participated in the 2018 SAFF U-15 Championship held in Nepal. After victories against India, Bhutan and Nepal, until finishing runner-up in the final against Bangladesh, the team drew by 1–1 draw until finally losing in the penalty shootout. The team also participated in the 2020 AFC U-16 Championship qualification in 2019.

=== 2020s ===
After inactivity due to the three-and-a-half years Pakistan Football Federation's suspension by FIFA, the team played at the 2023 SAFF U-16 Championship and 2024 SAFF U-17 Championship, both times ending semifinalists. In 2025, at the 2026 AFC U-17 Asian Cup qualification, the team ended second in the group stage and failed to qualify, but recorded a record 11–0 victory over Guam. In April 2026, the team participated at the UEFA Under-16 Development Tournament.

== Coaching staff ==
As of November 2026

Position	Name
Head coach	(Pakistan) Muhammad Habib
Assistant coaches	(Pakistan) Ghulam Shabbir
Assistant coaches	(Pakistan) Haji Abdul Sattar
Team manager	(Pakistan) Waseem Raja
Goalkeeping coach	(Pakistan) Noman Ibrahim

== Current Squad ==
The following 23 players were selected for the 2027 AFC U-17 Asian Cup qualification.

No.	Pos.	Player	Date of birth (age)	Club
	GK	Samar Razzak	5 March 2010 (aged 16)	(Pakistan Football Federation) Maidaan Football Academy
	GK	Wali Ullah		(Pakistan Football Federation)
	GK	Ahsan Ullah		(Pakistan Football Federation)
	DF	Nadeem Hussain		(Pakistan Football Federation)
	DF	Hamza Khan		(Pakistan Football Federation) Nowshera Star
	DF	Muhammad Hammad		(Pakistan Football Federation)
	DF	Syed Manzar Shah		(Pakistan Football Federation)
	DF	Mubashir Shah		(Pakistan Football Federation)
	DF	Muhammad Awais		(Pakistan Football Federation)
	DF	Hasnain Ali		(Pakistan Football Federation)
	DF	Mohsin Amin		(Pakistan Football Federation)
	MF	Abdul Samad Khan (captain)		(Association of Football Federations of Azerbaijan) Qarabağ Youth
	MF	Arsalan Fareedi		(Pakistan Football Federation)
	MF	Muhammad Khalil Ullah		(Pakistan Football Federation)
	MF	Muhammad Irmad Sarwar		(Pakistan Football Federation)
	MF	Muhammad Anees		(Pakistan Football Federation)
	MF	Bari Dad		(Pakistan Football Federation)
	MF	Muhammad Essa	27 March 2010 (aged 16)	(Pakistan Football Federation) Maidaan Football Academy
	FW	Muhammad Raffy		(Pakistan Football Federation)
	FW	Muhammad Moosa		(Pakistan Football Federation)
	FW	Muhammad Shahzad		(Pakistan Football Federation)
	FW	Hazrat Abbas		(Pakistan Football Federation)
	FW	Haris Khan		(Pakistan Football Federation)

== Results and fixtures ==
The following is a list of match results in the last 12 months, as well as any future matches that have been scheduled.

Win Draw Loss

=== 2026 ===
25 April 2026 UEFA Under-16 Development Tournament	Pakistan	1–4	Kazakhstan	Shymkent, Kazakhstan
	A. Samad		P. Shipitsin 5'; A. Tolendi 20'; D. Zarechny 29'; D. Kassi 45'

27 April 2026 UEFA Under-16 Development Tournament	Pakistan	1–2	Russia	Shymkent, Kazakhstan
	Shahraz Khan 50'		A. Braginets 7'; K. Denisov 78'

30 April 2026 UEFA Under-16 Development Tournament	Pakistan	0–1	Azerbaijan	Shymkent, Kazakhstan
			77'

8 November 2026 2027 AFC U-17 Asian Cup qualification	Pakistan	v	Sri Lanka	Vientiane, Laos
				Stadium: New Laos National Stadium

11 November 2026 2027 AFC U-17 Asian Cup qualification	Pakistan	v	Iran	Vientiane, Laos
				Stadium: New Laos National Stadium

14 November 2026 2027 AFC U-17 Asian Cup qualification	Pakistan	v	Laos	Vientiane, Laos
				Stadium: New Laos National Stadium

20 November 2026 2027 AFC U-17 Asian Cup qualification	Pakistan	v	Jordan	Vientiane, Laos
				Stadium: New Laos National Stadium

== Competition records ==
=== FIFA U-17 World Cup ===
FIFA U-17 World Cup record
Host/Year	Result	Position	Pld	W	D*	L	GF	GA
(China) 1985 to (Chile) 2015	did not qualify							
(India) 2017 to (Qatar) 2025	did not enter							
Total	0/20	–	–	–	–	–	–	–

=== AFC U-17 Asian Cup ===
AFC U-17 Asian Cup record
Host/Year	Result	Position	Pld	W	D*	L	GF	GA
(Qatar) 1985 to (United Arab Emirates) 1990	did not enter							
(Saudi Arabia) 1992	did not qualify							
(Qatar) 1994	did not enter							
(Thailand) 1996	did not enter							
(Qatar) 1998	did not qualify							
(Vietnam) 2000	did not qualify							
(United Arab Emirates) 2002	Group Stage	10th	3	0	1	2	2	6
(Japan) 2004	did not enter							
(Singapore) 2006 to (Thailand) 2014	did not qualify							
(India) 2016 to (Saudi Arabia) 2025	did not enter							
(Saudi Arabia) 2026	did not qualify							
Total	1/19	–	3	0	1	2	2	6

=== SAFF U-16 Championship ===
SAFF U-15/16/17 Championship record
Hosts / Year	Result	Position	GP	W	D*	L	GS	GA
(Nepal) 2011	Champions	1/6	4	4	0	0	11	1
(Nepal) 2013	Group Stage	5/7	3	0	2	1	0	3
(Bangladesh) 2015	Withdrew	0/6	0	0	0	0	0	0
(Nepal) 2017	did not enter	0/6	0	0	0	0	0	0
(Nepal) 2018	Runners-up	2/6	4	3	0	1	11	2
(India) 2019	did not enter	0/6	0	0	0	0	0	0
(Sri Lanka) 2022	did not enter	0/6	0	0	0	0	0	0
(Bhutan) 2023	Semi-Final	3/6	3	2	0	1	6	3
(Bhutan) 2024	Semi-Final	3/7	4	2	2	0	11	6
(Bhutan) 2025	Semi-Final	3/7	4	2	0	2	11	7
Total	6/10	1 Title	22	13	6	3	50	22

== Honours ==
- SAFF U-17 Championship
  - (gold) Champions: 2011
  - (silver) Runners-up 2018

== See also ==
- Pakistan national football team
- Pakistan national under-23 football team
- Pakistan national under-20 football team
