= Bangladesh national under-17 football team =

National association football team

Bangladesh Under-17
- Nickname(s): Bengal Tigers, Red and Greens, Junior Tigers
- Association: Bangladesh Football Federation
- Confederation: AFC (Asia)
- Sub-confederation: SAFF (South Asia)
- Head coach: Lodewijk de Kruif
- Captain: Nazmul Huda Faysal
- Home stadium: National Stadium; BSSSS Mostafa Kamal Stadium
First colours	Second colours

First international
- Qatar 6–1 Bangladesh (Doha, Qatar; 15 November 1986)

FIFA U-17 World Cup
- Appearances: None

AFC U-17 Asian Cup
- Appearances: 6 (first in 1986)
- Best result: Group Stage

SAFF U-17 Championship
- Appearances: 10 (first in 2011)
- Best result: Champions ( 2015, 2018)

The Bangladesh U-17 national football team (Bengali: বাংলাদেশ অনূর্ধ্ব-১৭ জাতীয় ফুটবল দল), is a youth football team operated under the Bangladesh Football Federation (BFF). The team would represent Bangladesh in the AFC U-17 Asian Cup, SAFF U-17 Championship, FIFA U-17 World Cup as well as any other under-17, under-16 & under-15 international football tournaments.

They have qualified for the AFC U-17 Asian Cup seven previous times and is yet to qualify for FIFA U-17 World Cup. The team has taken part in nine editions of the SAFF U-17 Championship and has won the tournament in both 2015 and 2018.

== Coaches ==
=== Coaching staff ===
As of 30 June 2026

Position	Name
Position	Name
Head coach	(Netherlands) Lodewijk de Kruif
Assistant coach	(Bangladesh) Atiqur Rahman Meshu (Italy) Dragos Alin Hogea
Fitness trainer	(Italy) Dragos Alin Hogea
Team manager	(Bangladesh) Sameed Quasem
Goalkeeping coach	(Spain) Jose Maria Moreno Martinez
Physiotherapist	(Bangladesh) KM Shakib
Media officer	(Bangladesh) Md Hasan Mahmud

=== Manager history ===
Year	Head coach
1986	(Bangladesh) Shamsuzzoha Chad
1990	(Bangladesh) Abdur Rahim
1992	(Bangladesh) Hasanuzzaman Khan Bablu
2000	(Bangladesh) Pranab Kumar Dey Banu
2004	(Bangladesh) Shahidur Rahman Shantoo
2006	(Bangladesh) Mahabub Hossain Roksy
2011	(Bangladesh) Nurul Haque Manik
2015	(Bangladesh) Syed Golam Jilani
2017–2020	(Bangladesh) Mustafa Anwar Parvez Babu
2019	(England) Rob Ryles
2022	(England) Paul Smalley
2023	(Bangladesh) Saifur Rahman Moni
2024	(Bangladesh) Saiful Bari Titu
2025–2026	(Bangladesh) Golam Robbani Choton
2026	(England) Gerard Jones
2026–	(Netherlands) Lodewijk de Kruif

== Recent fixtures and results ==
Win Draw Loss

=== 2025 ===
22 November 2025 2026 AFC U17 Q	Bangladesh	5–0	Timor-Leste	Chongqing, China
14:00 UTC+8	Kazi 11'; Manik 28', 43'; Bostami 49'; Ahmmed 88'	Report		Stadium: Tongliang Long Stadium

24 November 2025 2026 AFC U17 Q	Bangladesh	8–0	Brunei	Chongqing, China
14:00 UTC+8	Rahman 13', 49'; Kazi 23', 73'; Faysal 36'; Manik 37'; Ahmmed 75'; Arif 79'	Report		Stadium: Yongchuan Sports Center

26 November 2025 2026 AFC U17 Q	Bangladesh	5–0	Sri Lanka	Chongqing, China
14:00 UTC+8	Islam 24'; Manik 29'; Faysal 64', 90+1'; Bostami 90'	Report		Stadium: Tongliang Long Stadium

28 November 2025 2026 AFC U17 Q	Bangladesh	2–1	Bahrain	Chongqing, China
15:00 UTC+8	Bostami 59'; Manik 72'	Report	Zuhair 85'	Stadium: Yongchuan Sports Center

30 November 2025 2026 AFC U17 Q	Bangladesh	0–4	China	Chongqing, China
19:35 UTC+8	Shuai Weihao 8', 38', 53'; Zhao Songyuan 89'	Report		Stadium: Tongliang Long Stadium; Attendance: 15,291; Referee: Yahya Al-Balushi (Oman)

=== 2026 ===
8 November 2026 2027 AFC U17 Q	Syria	5–1	Bangladesh	Ras Al Khaimah, United Arab Emirates
17:20 UTC+6	Taha 14' (pen.), 78'; Al Salhani 40' (pen.); Al Hammoud 44'; Maghmoma 90+1'	Report	Bostami 48'	Stadium: Emirates Football Club Stadium; Referee: Mrutyunjay Lingaraj Amatya (India)

14 November 2026 2027 AFC U17 Q	Bangladesh	4–0	Bhutan	Ras Al Khaimah, United Arab Emirates
21:20 UTC+6	Ullah 8'; Ahmmed 15'; Bostami 28'; Arafat 67'	Report		Stadium: Saud Bin Saqr Al Qasimi Stadium; Referee: Huseen Jamal (Kuwait)

17 November 2026 2027 AFC U17 Q	Bangladesh	1–0	Macau	Ras Al Khaimah, United Arab Emirates
17:20 UTC+6	Mustakim 55'	Report		Stadium: Saud Bin Saqr Al Qasimi Stadium; Referee: Mahmoud Seifeddine (Lebanon)

20 November 2026 2027 AFC U17 Q	United Arab Emirates	2–0	Bangladesh	Ras Al Khaimah, United Arab Emirates
21:20 UTC+6	Gamal 61' (pen.); Esaadi 90+4'	Report		Stadium: Emirates Football Club Stadium; Referee: Abdulmajeed Al-Ghadani (Oman)

== Squad ==
=== Current squad ===
The following 23 players are named in the squad for 2026 AFC U-17 Asian Cup qualification.

No.	Pos.	Player	Date of birth (age)	Club
	GK	Md Alif Rahman Imtiage		(Bangladesh Football Federation) BFF Elite Academy
	GK	Md Tahsin Saheb		(Bangladesh Football Federation) PWD SC
	GK	Chandro Saha		(Bangladesh Football Federation) BFF Elite Academy
	DF	Md Sabbir Islam		(Bangladesh Football Federation) BFF Elite Academy
	DF	Ihsan Habib Ridwan		(Bangladesh Football Federation) BFF Elite Academy
	DF	Md Azam Khan		(Bangladesh Football Federation) BFF Elite Academy
	DF	Md Ikramul Islam		(Bangladesh Football Federation) BFF Elite Academy
	DF	Md Raj		(Bangladesh Football Federation) BFF Elite Academy
	DF	Md Tarek Hossain		(Bangladesh Football Federation) BKSP
	DF	Md Masud Rana		(Bangladesh Football Federation) BKSP
	MF	Md Shopon Hossain		(Bangladesh Football Federation) BFF Elite Academy
	MF	Md Kamal Merdha		(Bangladesh Football Federation) BFF Elite Academy
	MF	Md Arif		(Bangladesh Football Federation) BKSP
	MF	Md Nasrullah Sheikh		(Bangladesh Football Federation) BKSP
	MF	Nazmul Huda Faysal (captain)		(Bangladesh Football Federation) BFF Elite Academy
	MF	Bayzit Bostami		(Bangladesh Football Federation) BKSP
	MF	Md Akash Ahammed		(Bangladesh Football Federation) BFF Elite Academy
	FW	Md Opu Rahman		(Bangladesh Football Federation) BKSP
	FW	Md Manik		(Bangladesh Football Federation) BFF Elite Academy
	FW	Md Rifat Kazi		(Bangladesh Football Federation) BFF Elite Academy
	FW	Md Hedayet Ullah		(Bangladesh Football Federation) BFF Elite Academy
	FW	Md Mahim Miah Sojib		(Bangladesh Football Federation) BFF Elite Academy
	FW	Tahsan Kha		(Bangladesh Football Federation) BFF Elite Academy

=== Recent call-ups ===
The following players were called up to the squad in the past 12 months.

Pos.	Player	Date of birth (age)	Caps	Goals	Club	Latest call-up
DF	Md Shadat Hossain				(Bangladesh) BKSP	2025 SAFF U-17 Championship
MF	Ruhul Amin Akash				(Bangladesh) BKSP	2025 SAFF U-17 Championship
FW	Mohin Ahmmed				(Bangladesh) BKSP	2025 SAFF U-17 Championship
^{INJ} Withdrew due to injury^{PRE} Preliminary squad / standby^{TP} Training partner^{WD} Player withdrew from the squad due to non-injury issue.

== Competition records ==
=== FIFA U-17 World Cup ===
FIFA U-17 World Cup records
Host/Year	Result	Position	Pld	W	D*	L	GF	GA
(China) 1985 to (Brazil) 2019	Did not qualify							
(Peru) 2021	Cancelled							
(Indonesia) 2023	Did not qualify							
(Qatar) 2025	Did not qualify							
(Qatar) 2026	Did not qualify							
(Qatar) 2027	Did not qualify							
Total	0/20	0 Title	0	0	0	0	0	0

=== AFC U-17 Asian Cup ===
AFC U-17 Asian Cup records										Qualification					
Year	Result	Position	Pld	W	D	L	GF	GA	Squad	Pld	W	D	L	GF	GA
(Qatar) 1985	Withdrew									Withdrew					
(Qatar) 1986	Group stage	7/8	3	1	0	2	3	8	N/A	2	1	0	1	3	6
(Thailand) 1988	Did not qualify									4	0	1	3	2	5
(United Arab Emirates) 1990	Did not qualify									3	1	2	1	7	3
(Saudi Arabia) 1992	Group stage	8/8	3	0	0	3	2	13	N/A	4	4	0	0	15	0
(Qatar) 1994	Did not qualify									N/A					
(Thailand) 1996	Did not qualify									2	1	0	1	3	2
(Qatar) 1998	Group stage	8/10	4	0	2	2	4	9	N/A	3	3	0	0	16	0
(Vietnam) 2000	Group stage	6/10	4	2	0	2	4	7	N/A	3	2	0	1	4	2
(United Arab Emirates) 2002	Banned from participation									Banned from participation					
(Japan) 2004	Group stage	15/16	3	0	1	2	3	10	N/A	2	2	0	0	3	0
(Singapore) 2006	Group stage	15/15	3	0	0	3	0	14	N/A	2	1	0	1	3	1
(Uzbekistan) 2008	Did not qualify									5	1	0	4	14	19
(Uzbekistan) 2010	Did not qualify									4	1	1	2	2	8
(Iran) 2012	Did not qualify									4	0	0	4	0	16
(Thailand) 2014	Withdrew									Withdrew					
(India) 2016	Did not qualify									2	0	0	2	2	11
(Malaysia) 2018	Did not qualify									2	1	0	1	2	2
(Bahrain) 2020	Cancelled									3	1	0	2	3	5
(Thailand) 2023	Did not qualify									3	2	0	1	4	5
(Saudi Arabia) 2025	Did not qualify									4	2	0	2	10	4
(Saudi Arabia) 2026	Did not qualify									5	4	0	1	20	5
(Uzbekistan) 2027	Did not qualify									4	2	0	2	6	7
Total	Group stage	6/20	20	3	3	14	16	59	—	61	29	4	29	119	105

=== SAFF U-17 Championship ===
SAFF U-17 Championship records
Hosts/Year	Result	Position	GP	W	D*	L	GS	GA
(Nepal) 2011	Third	4/6	4	1	1	2	7	6
(Nepal) 2013	Third	3/7	4	2	0	2	5	8
(Bangladesh) 2015	Champions	1/6	4	4	0	0	8	2
(Nepal) 2017	Third	3/6	4	3	0	1	17	4
(Nepal) 2018	Champions	1/6	4	4	0	0	13	3
(India) 2019	Third	3/5	4	2	0	2	13	11
(Sri Lanka) 2022	Semi-finals	3/6	3	2	0	1	11	3
(Bhutan) 2023	Runner-up	2/6	4	2	0	2	3	4
(Bhutan) 2024	Runner-up	2/7	4	1	1	2	3	6
(Sri Lanka) 2025	Runners-up	2/7	4	3	0	1	12	2
Total	10/10	2 Titles	39	24	2	13	92	49

== Head-to-head record ==
The following table shows Bangladesh's known head-to-head record in the Asian and regional competitions.

Opponent	Pld	W	D	L	GF	GA	GD	Win %
Afghanistan	3	2	0	1	4	3	+1	66.67
Bahrain	3	1	0	2	4	9	−5	33.33
Bhutan	5	5	0	0	21	2	+19	100.00
Brunei	1	1	0	0	8	0	+8	100.00
Cambodia	1	0	0	1	0	1	−1	0.00
China	3	0	0	3	0	10	−10	0.00
Chinese Taipei	1	0	0	1	1	2	−1	0.00
Guam	1	1	0	0	11	0	+11	100.00
India	14	3	4	7	11	20	−9	21.43
Indonesia	2	1	1	0	2	1	+1	50.00
Iran	2	0	0	2	0	7	−7	0.00
Iraq	2	0	0	2	1	10	−9	0.00
Japan	2	0	1	1	2	8	−6	0.00
Kuwait	1	1	0	0	1	0	+1	100.00
Kyrgyzstan	2	2	0	0	3	0	+3	100.00
Macau	1	1	0	0	7	0	+7	100.00
Malaysia	1	1	0	0	4	0	+4	100.00
Maldives	4	3	1	0	19	1	+18	75.00
Nepal	11	5	1	5	21	17	+4	45.45
North Korea	1	0	0	1	0	3	−3	0.00
Oman	2	0	1	1	2	4	−2	0.00
Pakistan	7	3	3	1	10	8	+2	42.86
Palestine	1	0	0	1	0	2	−2	0.00
Philippines	2	2	0	0	2	0	+2	100.00
Qatar	5	1	0	4	4	18	−14	20.00
Saudi Arabia	3	0	0	3	1	10	−9	0.00
Singapore	1	1	0	0	2	1	+1	100.00
South Korea	2	0	1	1	3	4	−1	0.00
Sri Lanka	12	11	0	1	46	6	+40	91.67
Syria	1	0	0	1	0	7	−7	0.00
Thailand	3	1	1	1	4	3	+1	33.33
Timor-Leste	1	1	0	0	5	0	+5	100.00
Arab Emirates	1	0	0	1	1	6	−5	0.00
Uzbekistan	1	0	1	0	1	1	+0	0.00
Vietnam	1	0	0	1	0	2	−2	0.00
Yemen	3	0	0	3	0	9	−9	0.00
Total	107	47	15	45	201	175	+26	43.93

- Last Updated on 30 November 2025

== Honours ==
2015 SAFF U-16 Championship winning team pictures with then Prime Minister Sheikh Hasina at Ganabhaban, Dhaka.

- SAFF U-17 Championship
  - Winners (2): 2015, 2018
- UEFA Assist U-16 Development Tournament
  - Winners (1): 2019

== See also ==
- Bangladesh national football team
- Bangladesh under-23 football team
- Bangladesh under-20 football team
- Bangladesh women's national football team
- Bangladesh women's under-20 football team
- Bangladesh women's under-17 football team
