= 2019 SAFF U-15 Championship =

Tournament details
- Host country: India
- Dates: 21–31 August
- Teams: 5 (from 1 confederation)
- Venue: 1 (in Kalyani host cities)

Final positions
- Champions: India (3rd title)
- Runners-up: Nepal
- Third place: Bangladesh
- Fourth place: Sri Lanka

Tournament statistics
- Matches played: 11
- Goals scored: 60 (5.45 per match)
- Attendance: 35,690 (3,245 per match)
- Top scorer(s): (India) Himanshu Jangra (7 Goals)
- Best player: (India) Himanshu Jangra
- Fair play award: Bangladesh

The 2019 SAFF U-15 Championship was the sixth edition of the SAFF U-15 Championship, an international football competition for men's under-15 national teams organized by South Asian Football Federation (SAFF). The tournament was hosted by India at Kalyani Stadium from August 21 to August 31, 2019. Five teams from the region took part in the tournament.

Bangladesh is the defending champion. They have won previous season title by beating Pakistan 1(3)−1(2) penalties shoot out on 3 November 2018.

== Squads ==
Players born on or after 1 January 2004 are eligible to compete in the tournament. Each team have to register a squad of minimum 18 players and maximum 23 players, minimum three of whom had to be goalkeepers.

== Participating teams ==
Pakistan had sent their entry for the meet. However, due to some internal problems in their federation, they have withdrawn. A letter to reconfirm their entry was sent by SAFF, Pakistan said they would not be able to participate.

Team	Appearances in the SAFF U-15 Championship	Previous best performance
Bangladesh	6th	Champions (2015), (2018)
Bhutan	4th	Fourth Place
India (Host)	6th	Champions (2013, 2017)
Nepal	6th	Runners-up (2013, 2017)
Sri Lanka	5th	Group Stage

== Officials ==
Referees

- Bhubon Tarafder (Bangladesh)
- Nabindra Maharjan (Nepal)
- Ugyen Penjor (Bhutan)
- (Sri Lanka) Sanjaya Chathuranga (Sri Lanka)
- Vinay Suvarna (India)

Assistant Referees

- Khorshed Alam (Bangladesh)
- Madhav Khatri (Nepal)
- Pema Pema (Bhutan)
- (Sri Lanka) Riyazy Salam (Sri Lanka)
- Ujjal Halder (India)

== Venues ==
Kalyani	2019 SAFF U-15 Championship is located in India
Kalyani Stadium	2019 SAFF U-15 Championship is located in India
22°52′59″N 88°45′34.07″E	2019 SAFF U-15 Championship is located in India
Capacity: 20,000 seats	2019 SAFF U-15 Championship is located in India

== Round Robin ==
All the five teams will play each other in a round robin phase and the top two teams will play the final.

- All matches are played in Kalyani, India.
- Times listed are UTC+05:30.

Key to colours in group tables
Advance to Final

Pos	Team	Pld	W	D	L	GF	GA	GD	Pts	Status
1	India (H, C)	4	4	0	0	21	0	+21	12	Advance to Final
2	Nepal	4	3	0	1	12	6	+6	9	Advance to Final
3	Bangladesh	4	2	0	2	13	11	+2	6	
4	Sri Lanka	4	1	0	3	4	16	−12	3	
5	Bhutan	4	0	0	4	4	20	−16	0	

Source: SAFF
Rules for classification: 1) points; 2) head-to-head points; 3) head-to-head goal difference; 4) goal difference; 5) number of goals scored;
(C) Champions; (H) Hosts

21 August 2019
12:00

Nepal	0−5	India
	Report	Tongbram 6'; Paul 24'; Mazumder 41'; Loitongbam 50'; Nongmeikapam 56'

Kalyani Stadium, Kalyani
Attendance: 5,600
Referee: K.L.S. Chaturanga (Sri Lanka)

21 August 2019
15:00

Sri Lanka	3–2	Bhutan
Jayalath 52'; Neil 73'; Shakeel 90+2'	Report	Tenzin 7'; Chozang 47'

Kalyani Stadium, Kalyani
Attendance: 1,840
Referee: Bhubon Tarafder (Bangladesh)

23 August 2019
12:00

Bhutan	2−5	Bangladesh
Dorji 17'; Chozang 32'	Report	Mirad 15', 83'; Rahman 21'; Sarkar 45'; Raju 90+7'

Kalyani Stadium, Kalyani
Attendance: 2,890
Referee: Nabindra Maharjan (Nepal)

23 August 2019
15:00

Nepal	2−0	Sri Lanka
Bohora 46'; Rai 83'	Report

Kalyani Stadium, Kalyani
Attendance: 3,210
Referee: Vinay Suvarna (India)

25 August 2019
12:00

Bangladesh	7−1	Sri Lanka
Rahman 32', 44', 60', 71'; Islam 42'; Mirad 48'; Rabbi 67'	Report	Shakeel 50'

Kalyani Stadium, Kalyani
Attendance: 2,000
Referee: Ugyen Penjor (Bhutan)

25 August 2019
15:00

India	7−0	Bhutan
Loitongbam 1', 57'; Nongmeikapam 9', 25'; Singson 22'; Zomuanpuia 86'; Yumnam 89'	Report

Kalyani Stadium, Kalyani
Attendance: 3,450
Referee: Bhubon Tarafder (Bangladesh)

27 August 2019
12:00

India	5–0	Sri Lanka
Jangra 32', 42', 60'; Tongbram 38'; Paul 45+4'	Report

Kalyani Stadium, Kalyani
Attendance: 3,500
Referee: Nabindra Maharjan (Nepal)

27 August 2019
15:00

Bangladesh	1–4	Nepal
Mia 79'	Report	Yadav 45+2', 88'; Jimee 52'; Lamsal 84'

Kalyani Stadium, Kalyani
Attendance: 1,800
Referee: Vinay Suvarna (India)

29 August 2019
12:00

Bhutan	0–6	Nepal
	Report	Lamsal 5', 48'; Khatri 9'; Rai 75'; Sapkota 85'; Jimee 94'

Kalyani Stadium, Kalyani
Attendance: 3,600
Referee: Vinay Suvarna (India)

29 August 2019
15:00

Bangladesh	0–4	India
	Report	Jangra 29', 74', 79'; Paul 89'

Kalyani Stadium, Kalyani
Attendance: 3000
Referee: K.L.S. Chaturanga (Sri Lanka)

== Final ==
31 August 2019
15:00 UTC+5:30

India	7−0	Nepal
Tongbram 15'; Amandeep 42'; Leimapokam 45+3'; Nongmeikapam 51', 76', 80'; Jangra 65'	Report

Kalyani Stadium, Kalyani
Attendance: 4,800
Referee: Bhubon Tarafder (Bangladesh)

== Winner ==
2019 SAFF U-15 Championship

India
Third title

== Goalscorers ==
There were 60 goals scored in 11 matches, for an average of 5.45 goals per match.

7 goals

- (India) Himanshu Jangra

6 goals

- (India) Sridarth Nongmeikapam

5 goals

- (Bangladesh) Al Amin Rahman

3 goals

- (Bangladesh) Al Mirad
- (India) Shubho Paul
- (India) Taison Singh Loitongbam
- (Nepal) Pradip Lamsal
- (India) Maheson Singh Tongbram

2 goals

- (Bhutan) Sonam Jugdrul Chozang
- (Nepal) Krisna Adhikari Yadav
- (Nepal) Ashim Rai
- (Sri Lanka) Muhammed Shakeel

1 goal

- (Bangladesh) Md. Badsha Mia
- (Bangladesh) Golam Rabbi
- (Bangladesh) Rakibul Islam
- (Bangladesh) Arifur Rahman Raju
- (Bangladesh) Shuvo Sarkar
- (Bhutan) Phub Dorji
- (Bhutan) Kinzang Tenzin
- (India) Renedy Meitei Yumnam
- (India) Isaac Zomuanpuia
- (India) Paogoumang Singson
- (India) Anish Mazumder
- (India) Amandeep
- (India) Sibajit Singh Leimapokam
- (Nepal) Sasank Bohora
- (Nepal) Sugan Jimee
- (Nepal) Kris Sapkota
- (Nepal) Nirajan Khatri
- (Sri Lanka) Fernando Derick Neil
- (Sri Lanka) Tushmika Jayalath

== Broadcasting rights ==
Country	Broadcaster
India (host)	MYCUJOO.TV
South Asian Countries	MYCUJOO.TV
South-East Asian Countries	MYCUJOO.TV
