= Pakistan national youth football team =

Pakistan national youth football teams are several national youth football teams that represent the country in international youth football competitions.

- Pakistan national under-23 football team
- Pakistan national under-20 football team
- Pakistan national under-17 football team
