= SAFF U-17 Championship =

- Founded: 2011
- Region: SAFF
- Teams: 7
- Related competitions: SAFF U-17 Women's Championship
- Current champions: India (7th title)
- Most championships: India (7 titles)
- 2026 SAFF U-17 Championship

The SAFF U-15/U-16/U-17 Championship is an annual international football competition contested by the national teams of the members of the South Asian Football Federation (SAFF). The first edition was held as SAFF U-16 Championship, where most teams sent their U-15 team, keeping in mind AFC U-17 Asian Cup held every following years to SAFF U-16 Championship. In the 2017 edition, it was held as SAFF U-15 Championship and the subsequent 2022 edition, the SAFF U-17 Championship was introduced. The first edition of the tournament took place in Nepal in August 2011. The competition was launched under the leadership of SAFF President Kazi Salahuddin who was elected in 2009.

== Results ==
Ed.	Year	Cat.	Host	Final			Third place playoff			No. of teams
Ed.	Year	Cat.	Host	Champion	Score	Runner-up	Third place	Score	Fourth place	No. of teams
1	2011	U-16	Nepal	Pakistan	2–1	India	Nepal	2–1	Bangladesh	6
2	2013	U-16	Nepal	India	1–0	Nepal	Bangladesh	1–0	Afghanistan	7
3	2015	U-16	Bangladesh	Bangladesh	1–1 (4–2 p)	India	Afghanistan and Nepal			6
4	2017	U-15	Nepal	India	2–1	Nepal	Bangladesh	8–0	Bhutan	6
5	2018	U-15	Nepal	Bangladesh	1–1 (3–2 p)	Pakistan	India	1–0	Nepal	6
6	2019	U-15	India	India	7–0	Nepal	Bangladesh	^{RR}	Sri Lanka	5
7	2022	U-17	Sri Lanka	India	4–0	Nepal	Bangladesh and Sri Lanka			6
8	2023	U-16	Bhutan	India	2–0	Bangladesh	Pakistan and Maldives			6
9	2024	U-17	Bhutan	India	2–0	Bangladesh	Nepal and Pakistan			7
10	2025	U-17	Sri Lanka	India	2–2 (4–1 p)	Bangladesh	Pakistan and Nepal			7
11	2026	U-17	Pakistan							

== Participating nations ==
Legend

- 1st – Champions
- 2nd – Runners-up
- 3rd – Third place
- 4th – Fourth place
- SF – Semifinals
- GS – Group stage
- q – Qualified for upcoming tournament
- — Hosts
- × – Did not enter
- • – Did not qualify
- × – Withdrew before qualification
- — Withdrew/Disqualified after qualification
- — Not part of SAFF

Team	(Nepal) 2011	(Nepal) 2013	(Bangladesh) 2015	(Nepal) 2017	(Nepal) 2018	(India) 2019	(Sri Lanka) 2022	(Bhutan) 2023	(Bhutan) 2024	(Sri Lanka) 2025	Total
Bangladesh	4th	3rd	1st	3rd	1st	3rd	SF	2nd	2nd	2nd	10
Bhutan	×	GS	×	4th	GS	GS	GS	GS	GS	GS	8
India	2nd	1st	2nd	1st	3rd	1st	1st	1st	1st	1st	10
Maldives	GS	×	GS	GS	GS	×	GS	SF	GS	GS	8
Nepal	3rd	2nd	SF	2nd	4th	2nd	2nd	GS	SF	SF	10
Pakistan	1st	GS	×	×	2nd	×	×	SF	SF	SF	6
Sri Lanka	GS	GS	GS	GS	×	GS	SF	×	GS	GS	8
Former member
Afghanistan	×	4th	SF	Not part of SAFF							2

== Performance by nation ==
- Bold: Indicates host.

Nation	Champions	Runners-up	Third-place	Fourth-place	Semi-finalists
India	7 (2013, 2017, **2019**, 2022, 2023, 2024, 2025)	2 (2011, 2015)	1 (2018)	—N/a	—N/a
Bangladesh	2 (**2015**, 2018)	3 (2023, 2024, 2025)	3 (2013, 2017, 2019)	1 (2011)	1 (2022)
Pakistan	1 (2011)	1 (2018)	—N/a	—N/a	3 (2023, 2024, 2025)
Nepal	—N/a	4 (**2013**, **2017**, 2019, 2022)	1 (**2011**)	1 (**2018**)	3 (2015, 2024, 2025)
Afghanistan	—N/a	—N/a	—N/a	1 (2013)	1 (2015)
Bhutan	—N/a	—N/a	—N/a	1 (2017)	—N/a
Sri Lanka	—N/a	—N/a	—N/a	—N/a	1 (**2022**)
Maldives	—N/a	—N/a	—N/a	—N/a	1 (2023)

== Awards ==
Year	Top scorer(s)	Goals	Best player	Fair play award
2011	(Pakistan) Mohammad Bilal	4	(Pakistan) Mansoor Khan	Not awarded
2013	(Nepal) Bimal Magar	6	(India) Krishna Pandit	Not awarded
2015	(India) Saurabh Meher	3	(Bangladesh) Sarwan Zaman Nipu	Nepal
2017	(Bangladesh) Foysal Ahmed Fahim	6	(India) Vikram Pratap Singh	Bangladesh
2018	(Bangladesh) Nihat Jaman Ucchash	4	(Pakistan) Haseeb Khan	Bangladesh
2019	(India) Himanshu Jangra	7	(India) Himanshu Jangra	Bangladesh
2022	(Bangladesh) Mirajul Islam (India) Thanglalsoun Gangte (Nepal) Unesh Budhathoki	4	Not awarded	Not awarded
2023	(India) Md Arbash	3	(India) Md Arbash	Pakistan
2024	(Nepal) Sujan Dangol	4	(India) Md Arbash	Bhutan
2025	(Pakistan) Muhammad Abdullah	6	(Bangladesh) Nazmul Faysal	India

== See also ==
- SAFF Championship
- SAFF U-20 Championship
- SAFF Women's Championship
- SAFF U-20 Women's Championship
- SAFF U-17 Women's Championship
