= Krishna Pandit =

Indian footballer

Personal information
- Full name: Krishna Pandit
- Date of birth: 29 August 1998 (age 28)
- Place of birth: Chandigarh, India
- Position: Forward

Youth career
- AIFF Regional Academy
- Minerva Punjab

Senior career*
Years	Team	Apps	(Gls)
2016–2017	Minerva Punjab	8	(1)
2018–	Goa B		
2018–	→ Gokulam Kerala (Loan)		

International career
2013–2014	India U16		
2015	India U19		
- * Club domestic league appearances and goals as of 8 January 2017

Krishna Pandit (born 29 August 1998) is an Indian professional footballer who plays as a forward for FC Goa B in the Goa Professional League.

== Club career ==
Pandit was born in Chandigarh, he took his schooling at St. John's High School, Chandigarh, and first went to learn football at the age of 8. Pandit played his first match in under-12 team as a midfielder. Pandit represented his state in national level competitions before being selected to join the AIFF Regional Academy in 2012. Before joining the academy, Pandit was coached by former India international Sanjeev Maria. He was considered very highly rated among most involved with Indian football after he scored eight goals in only five matches during the AFC U14 Festival. Eventually, Pandit joined Minerva Punjab, at the time still known as Minerva Academy. He soon played for the club during the I-League 2nd Division.

After Minerva Punjab earned a spot in the I-League, the top division of Indian football, Pandit made his professional debut on 8 January 2017 against Chennai City. He came on as a 76th-minute substitute for Manandeep Singh as Minerva Punjab drew the match 0–0.

=== Goa B ===
After the I-League season, Pandit joined the reserve side of Indian Super League club Goa.

== International career ==
Pandit has represented India at various age levels. He made his international debut for India at the under-14 level in May 2012 during the AFC U-14 Football Festival. He scored eight goals in five matches for India. In 2013, he was promoted to the under-16 side for the SAFF U-16 Championship.

== Career statistics ==
As of 8 January 2017

Club	Season	League			League Cup		Domestic Cup		Continental		Total	
Club	Season	Division	Apps	Goals	Apps	Goals	Apps	Goals	Apps	Goals	Apps	Goals
Minerva Punjab	2016–17	I-League	8	1	—	—	0	0	—	—	8	1
Career total			8	1	0	0	0	0	0	0	8	1

== Honours ==
=== Individual ===
- SAFF U-16 Championship Best Player: 2013
