= Tongliang Long Stadium =

Football stadium in Chongqing, China

- 铜梁龙体育场
- Interactive map of Tongliang Long Stadium
- Full name: Tongliang Long Stadium
- Former names: Tongliang District Stadium
- Address: No. 174 Longmen West Street, Tongliang District; Chongqing; China
- Coordinates: 29.834152°N 106.048649°E
- Owner: Tongliang District People's Government (67%); Sichuan Zhongheng Huayi Industrial
- Operator: Chongqing Tonglianglong F.C.
- Capacity: 20,000
- Surface: Natural grass
- Scoreboard: Yes
- Public transit: Line X at Longmen Station (planned)

Construction
- Renovated: 2023

Tenant
- Chongqing Tonglianglong F.C. (2023–present)

The Tongliang Long Stadium is a sports venue in Chongqing's Tongliang District, serving as the home ground for China League One club Chongqing Tonglianglong F.C.

== History ==
Opened in 2022, the stadium began hosting professional matches in March 2023 when Chongqing Tonglianglong F.C. entered China League Two. The club secured promotion to China League One that November after a 3-0 victory over Hubei Istar.

In 2024, average attendance reached 9,034 spectators during league matches. The stadium's accessibility improved in January 2025 with the opening of the Bishan-Tongliang Line rail connection.

== Facilities ==
The 20,000-seat venue meets Chinese Football Association standards for second-tier competitions. It lacks undersoil heating but features adjacent training pitches.
