= Sri Lanka national under-17 football team =

Sri Lanka Under-17
- Nickname(s): ල০කා සි০හයෝ, Lankan Lions
- Association: Football Federation of Sri Lanka
- Confederation: AFC (Asia)
- Sub-confederation: SAFF (South Asia)
- Head coach: Fazul Rahuman
- FIFA code: SRI
First colours	Second colours

First international
- Sri Lanka 0–4 Bangladesh (Kathmandu, Nepal; 21 April 1998)

Biggest win
- Guam 0–8 Sri Lanka (Kathmandu, Nepal; 23 April 1998)

Biggest defeat
- Saudi Arabia 10–0 Sri Lanka (Riyadh, Saudi Arabia; 22 September 2017)

FIFA U-17 World Cup
- Appearances: 0

AFC U-17 Asian Cup
- Appearances: 0

SAFF U-17 Championship
- Appearances: 8 (first in 2011)
- Best result: Semi-finals (2022)

The Sri Lanka national under-17 football team (Sinhala: ශ්‍රී ලංකා 17න් පහළ ජාතික පාපන්දු කණ්ඩායම Shri Lanka Dahathen Pahala Jathika Papandu Kandayama, Tamil: இலங்கை 17 வயதுக்குட்பட்ட தேசிய கால்பந்து அணி Ilaṅkai 17 vayatukkuṭpaṭṭa tēciya kālpantu aṇi), is the under-17 football team of Sri Lanka. The team participates in the U-16 football competitions in international football and is controlled by the Football Federation of Sri Lanka. The team has never qualified for the FIFA U-17 World Cup or the AFC U-17 Asian Cup.

== History ==
In 1998, the team played against the Bangladesh national under-17 football team in the qualifiers for the AFC U-16 Championship, but lost 4–0. The team won its first international game against the Guam national under-18 football team in that competition by a score of 8–0. The Sri Lankan team also participated in the qualifiers but failed to win a single game.

== Tournament records ==
=== FIFA U-17 World Cup ===
World Cup finals									World Cup qualifications					
Hosts/Year	Result	Position	GP	W	D	L	GS	GA	GP	W	D*	L	GS	GA
(China) 1985 to (Egypt) 1997	Did not Enter								Did not Enter					
(New Zealand) 1999 to (Chile) 2015	Did not Qualify								19	3	3	13	18	56
(India) 2017	Did not Enter								Did not Enter					
(Brazil) 2019 to (Indonesia) 2023	Did not Qualify								Did not qualify					
(Qatar) 2025	To be determined													
Total	0/20	-	-	-	-	-	-	-	19	3	3	13	18	56

=== AFC U-17 Asian Cup ===
Championship finals									Championship qualifications					
Hosts/Year	Result	Position	GP	W	D	L	GS	GA	GP	W	D*	L	GS	GA
(Qatar) 1985 to (Thailand) 1996	Did not Enter								Did not Enter					
(Qatar) 1998	Did not Qualify								3	1	0	2	8	5
(Vietnam) 2000	Did not Qualify								3	0	1	2	1	5
(United Arab Emirates) 2002	Did not Qualify								2	0	1	1	1	5
(Japan) 2004	Did not Qualify								2	1	0	1	4	4
(Singapore) 2006	Did not Qualify								1	0	0	1	0	3
(Uzbekistan) 2008	Did not Qualify								5	1	0	4	3	22
(Uzbekistan) 2010 and (Iran) 2012	Did not Enter								Did not Enter					
(Thailand) 2014	Did not Qualify								3	0	1	2	0	14
(India) 2016	Did not Enter								Did not Enter					
(Malaysia) 2018 and (Saudi Arabia) 2025	Did not Qualify								8	0	0	8	0	49
Total	0/19	-	-	-	-	-	-	-	27	3	3	21	18	105

=== SAFF U-17/16/15 Championship ===
Year	Host	Pos.	P	W	D	L	GF	GA
2011	Nepal	5/6	2	0	0	2	2	12
2013	Nepal	6/7	2	0	0	2	2	7
2015	Bangladesh	6/6	2	0	0	2	0	9
2017	Nepal	5/6	2	0	0	2	0	10
Total			8	0	0	8	4	38

== Fixtures and results ==
=== 2025 ===
Win Draw Lose

22 November 2026 AFC U17 Q	Brunei	0–4	Sri Lanka	Chongqing, China
		Report	M. Rishad 72', 90'; I. Gamaladdage 86'; Kevinash Kumara 14'	Stadium: Yongchuan Sports Center

24 November 2026 AFC U17 Q	Bahrain	2–1	Sri Lanka	Chongqing, China
	Kumail Fadhel Alsatrawi 80'; Mohammed Al Jazaf 43'	Report	Mohamed Zaid 90'	Stadium: Yongchuan Sports Center

26 November 2026 AFC U17 Q	Sri Lanka	0–5	Bangladesh	Chongqing, China
14:00 UTC+8		Report	Islam 24'; Manik 29'; Faysal 64', 90+1'; Bostami 90'	Stadium: Tongliang Long Stadium

28 November 2026 AFC U-17 Asian Cup Q	Sri Lanka	0–8	China	Chongqing
19:35		Report	Zhao Songyuan 13'; Zhang Xuyao 30'; Kuang Zhaolei 41'; He Sifan 47'; Shuai Weihao 55'; Wan Xiang 75', 77'; Zhang Bolin 84'	Stadium: Tongliang Long Stadium; Attendance: 15,346; Referee: Iv Tina (Cambodia)

30 November 2025 2026 AFC U17 Q	Timor-Leste	2–1	Sri Lanka	Chongqing, China
20:35 TLT		Report		Stadium: Tongliang Long Stadium

== Coaching staff ==
Position	Name
Head coach	(Sri Lanka) Fazul Rahuman
Assistant coach	(Sri Lanka) Anton Joy
Goalkeeping coach	(Sri Lanka) Manjula Fernando
Performance analyst	(Sri Lanka) Sanka Jayamina
Team doctor	(Sri Lanka) Chathura Akalanka Edirisinghe
Physiotherapist	(Sri Lanka) Saman Dayawansa
Masseur	(Sri Lanka) Ruwan Jayasuriya
Kitman	(Sri Lanka) Shabeer Perera
Media officer	(Sri Lanka) Isuru Maduwantha
Team staff	(Sri Lanka) Hiran Rathnayaka

== Current squad ==
The following 23 players were called up for the 2026 AFC U-17 Asian Cup qualification.

No.	Pos.	Player	Date of birth (age)	Club
1	GK	Shaathin Kathafi		
2	DF	Muhammed Irshadh		
5	DF	Hiruka Ratnayake		(United States Soccer Federation) Solar SC
3	MF	Halik Familkhan		
4	MF	Enosh Magage		
6	MF	Mohamed Nazeer		
7	MF	Ishaq Mouffer		(United Arab Emirates Football Association) Go-Pro Sports
8	MF	Irusha Gamaladdage		
9	MF	Aditha Menuhas Wickramarathne	1 January 2009 (aged 17)	(Italian Football Federation) AlbinoLeffe
11	MF	Mohamed Ifham		
12	MF	Hamood Rizwan		
13	MF	Mohamed Ufran		
14	MF	Humaid Haroon		
15	MF	Manula Fernando		
16	MF	Mohamed Riswan		
17	MF	Mohamed Adnan Ali		
18	MF	Mohamed Ishaq		
19	MF	Ahamed Wasim		
20	MF	Thanusiyan Theiventhiran		
21	MF	Kevinash Kumara		
22	MF	Yahya Ahamed		
23	MF	Ashfak Hanhar		
10	FW	Zafarullah Zakariyya	21 September 2009 (aged 16)	(United Arab Emirates Football Association) Manchester City Academy Dubai

== See also ==
- Sri Lanka national football team
- Sri Lanka women's national football team
- Sri Lanka national under-23 football team
- Sri Lanka national under-20 football team
