= Nepal national under-17 football team =

National youth association football team

Nepal Under-17
- Nickname: The Junior Gorkhalis
- Association: All Nepal Football Association
- Confederation: AFC (Asia)
- Sub-confederation: SAFF (South Asia)
- Head coach: Upendra Man Singh
- Home stadium: Dasarath Rangasala Stadium
- FIFA code: NEP
First colours	Second colours

Biggest win
- Guam 0–10 Nepal (Kathmandu, Nepal; 20 April 1998)

Biggest defeat
- Japan 9–2 Nepal (Doha, Qatar; 23 October 2024)

World Cup
- Appearances: 0

AFC U-17 Asian Cup
- Appearances: 3 (first in 2000)
- Best result: Group Stage (2000, 2006, 2014)

South Asian Championship
- Appearances: 10 (first in 2011)
- Best result: Runners-up (2013, 2017, 2019, 2022)

The Nepal national under-17 football team (Nepali: नेपाल राष्ट्रिय यू-१७ फुटबल टिम) is the under-17 football team of Nepal. The team is controlled by the All Nepal Football Association and is a member of the Asian Football Confederation.

== History ==
=== Early years ===
In the mid-1980s, FIFA provided financial assistance and sent a number of coaches to help Nepal launch its first youth programme, which was geared towards spotting talent at the grassroots level (such as in schools, for example) and providing young players with the necessary know-how, both on and off the pitch. The initial five-year plan helped half the players groomed under the first youth programme to find a place in the national side, and the team that won the 2 gold medals in the first and sixth South Asian Federation (SAF) Games mostly consisted of the players from that youth programme.

=== Youth investment ===
ANFA asked FIFA for financial assistance to check the downslide of Nepalese domestic football and in 1998, FIFA agreed to donate funds through its Financial Assistance Programme (FAP), thereby allowing ANFA to construct a secretariat along with a football pitch and a hostel in Kathmandu to launch its youth development programme. The two-year intensive training period for the youth players selected in 1998 produced a number of skilful players, who recently participated in the ninth South Asian Games (Pakistan, 29 March - 5 April). The same team had earlier topped its group in the Asian Cup preliminary round in March 2004.

However, despite reaching the finals tournament of the 2000 AFC U-17 Championship in Vietnam, Nepal refused to participate in a biological age test, and as a result was banned from the 2002 AFC U-17 Championship. This, along with the Maoist uprising left manager Stephen Constantine to resign.

In 2002, endeavours to develop football received a further fillip when FIFA awarded a Goal programme to Nepal. Thanks to this project, ANFA has constructed regional football centres that include hostels, office secretariats and playing grounds in three major towns in three different regions. ANFA built these centres to focus on spotting hidden talent in villages or schools around the nation. These centres will also provide the necessary coaching and physical training, and in the long-term, the nation as a whole will benefit with more regional football sides on a par with the clubs of Kathmandu.

=== Recent years ===
Nepal was fined by the Asian Football Confederation for fielding over-age players during the 2014 AFC U-16 Championship. Since the fine, the All Nepal Football Association has put in place several necessary age checks as part of selection/trials. The most recent team has qualified for the 2016 AFC U-16 Championship, making it the first Nepal U-16 team to achieve a back-to-back qualification in history. However, the team was then excluded from the tournament due to player Manish Karki failing an MRI bone test. Nepal was penalized and ruled to have forfeited all three of their qualification group matches where the ineligible player was fielded by a 3–0 scoreline.

== Stadium ==
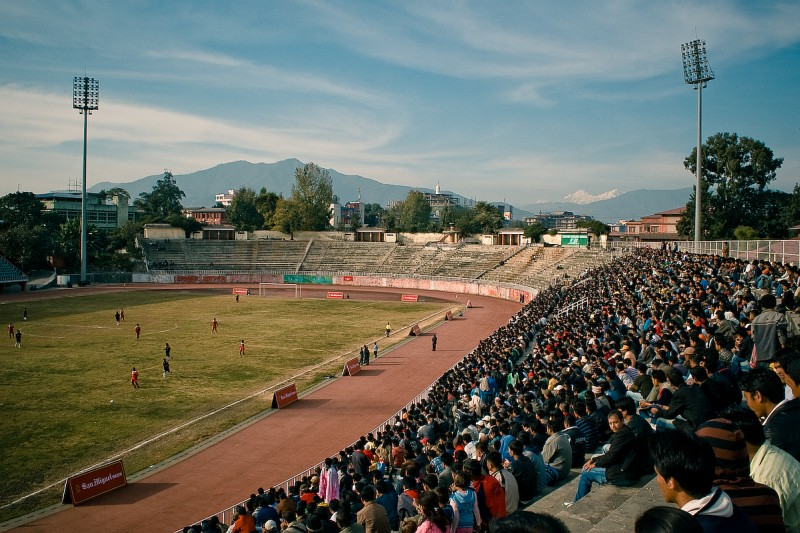
The stadium at daytime

The team's home ground is shared with the Nepal national football team at the Dasarath Rangasala Stadium, a multi-purpose stadium in Tripureswor, Kathmandu, Nepal. Holding 25,000 spectators, of which 5.000 seated, it is the biggest stadium in Nepal. It is named after Dashrath Chand, one of the martyrs of Nepal.

Most recently, the stadium was used as a primary venue for the 2012 AFC Challenge Cup and the 2013 SAFF Championship, with the Halchowk Stadium hosting some of the matches as well. Apart from sporting events, the stadium is also used as a music venue for cultural events with Bryan Adams being the most notable act that performed at the site.

Prior to the 2013 SAFF Championship in Nepal, the Dasarath Rangasala underwent heavy renovation that saw several improvements such as the expansion of seats from 20,000 to 25,000.

== Coaching staff ==
As of 18 March 2025

Position	Name
Head coach	(Nepal) Sanoj Shrestha (U17)
Head coach	(Nepal) Rabindra Silakar (U16)
Asst. Coach	(Nepal) Dhaneshwor Prajapati
Goalkeeper Coach	(Nepal) Prabin Khachhe Shrestha
Team Doctor	(Nepal) Raju Dangol
Physiotherapist	(Nepal) Nishant Joshi
Official	(Nepal) Dhan Kumar Lama Tamang
Official	(Nepal) Kalyan Kumar Khadka
Official	(Nepal) Ram Chandra Tamang Lama
Manager	(Nepal) Bijendra Pudasaini
Media Manager	(Nepal) Nilam Maharjan

== Players ==
=== U-17 Squad ===
The following 23 players were selected for the most recent fixtures in the 2026 AFC U-17 Asian Cup qualification.

No.	Pos.	Player	Date of birth (age)	Club
1	GK	Bishesh Baniya	11 September 2009 (age 17)	(All Nepal Football Association) New Road Team
16	GK	Ram Bahadur Bohara	2 October 2009 (age 17)	(All Nepal Football Association) Nepal Army F.C.
20	GK	Pemba Nurbu Bhote	22 October 2009 (age 17)	(All Nepal Football Association) Machhindra FC
4	DF	Birenda Malla		(All Nepal Football Association) Friends Club
5	DF	Anamol Karki		(All Nepal Football Association) Laiberi FC
8	DF	Mausam Rokaya	6 January 2009 (age 17)	(All Nepal Football Association) Nepal Army F.C.
3	DF	Dipen Karki		
6	DF	Prashant Moktan (captain)	21 January 2009 (age 17)	(All Nepal Football Association) Nepal Police F.C.
2	DF	Anoj Khadka		(All Nepal Football Association) Nepal Police F.C.
14	DF	Bhuban Kami		(All Nepal Football Association) Nepal Army F.C.
15	DF	Bhupesh Lama	21 May 2009 (age 17)	(All Nepal Football Association) Nepal Police F.C.
10	MF	Ram Thami	4 April 2009 (age 17)	(All Nepal Football Association) Nepal Police F.C.
17	MF	Nasib Hejman		
19	MF	Prasanta Menyangbo	19 June 2009 (age 17)	(All Nepal Football Association) Machhindra FC
23	MF	Nischal Magar	7 June 2009 (age 17)	(All Nepal Football Association) Nepal Police F.C.
7	FW	Sushan Thapa Magar		(All Nepal Football Association) Church Boys United
9	FW	Dig Bijaya Shahi	5 September 2009 (age 17)	(All Nepal Football Association) Nepal Army F.C.
11	FW	Laxman Thami	4 April 2009 (age 17)	(All Nepal Football Association) Nepal Police F.C.
12	FW	Pratis Thapa Mahar		(All Nepal Football Association) Rara F.C.
13	FW	Samir Kumar		(All Nepal Football Association) Nepal Police F.C.
18	FW	Sujan Syangtan		(All Nepal Football Association) Himalayan Sherpa Club
21	FW	Nis Kumar Shrestha		(All Nepal Football Association) Jalthal F.C.
22	FW	Sanjay Herman		(All Nepal Football Association) Church Boys United

=== U-16 Squad ===
- The 23-man squad was Entered for the 2023 SAFF U-16 Championship.

No.	Pos.	Player	Date of birth (age)	Caps	Goals	Club
	GK	Pemba Nurbu Bhote	22 October 2009 (age 17)			(All Nepal Football Association) Machhindra U-16
	GK	Bishesh Baniya	11 September 2009 (age 17)			(All Nepal Football Association) NRT U16
	GK	Bhakta Bahadur Pariyar	30 January 2008 (age 18)			(All Nepal Football Association) Nepal Police U-16
	DF	Ekraj Bishwokarma	20 December 2008 (age 17)			(All Nepal Football Association) Sankata U-16
	DF	Bhuvan Kami	18 January 2009 (age 17)			(All Nepal Football Association) Nepal Army U-16
	DF	Prashant Moktan	21 January 2009 (age 17)			(All Nepal Football Association) NPC U-16
	DF	Nishan Raj Lawot	29 August 2008 (age 18)			(All Nepal Football Association) MMC U-16
	DF	Saran SK	17 December 2008 (age 17)			(All Nepal Football Association) Sankata U-16
	DF	Kishan Thapa	9 May 2009 (age 17)			(All Nepal Football Association) Nepal Army U-16
	DF	Arbind Kumar Dhami				(All Nepal Football Association) APF U-16
	DF	Kishor Kumar Danwar				(All Nepal Football Association) ANFA Academy
	MF	Sujal Syangtan	9 August 2009 (age 17)			(All Nepal Football Association) NRT U-16
	MF	Ram Thami	4 April 2009 (age 17)			(All Nepal Football Association) NPC U-16
	MF	Pemba Tamang	23 March 2010 (age 16)			(All Nepal Football Association) MMC U-16
	MF	Ganesh Pulami Magar	25 March 2008 (age 18)			(All Nepal Football Association) NPC U-16
	MF	Binayak Tharu				(All Nepal Football Association) NRT U-16
	MF	Dilan Limbu	18 December 2008 (age 17)			(All Nepal Football Association) Sankata U-16
	MF	Subash Bam	5 September 2008 (age 18)			(All Nepal Football Association) NPC U-16
	MF	Laxman Thami	4 April 2009 (age 17)			(All Nepal Football Association) NPC U-16
	FW	Rohit Shrestha	17 August 2009 (age 17)			(All Nepal Football Association) Nepal Army U-16
	FW	Santosh Gongba	13 October 2008 (age 18)			(All Nepal Football Association) NRT U-16
	FW	Spandan Nepal	19 September 2010 (age 16)			(All Nepal Football Association) Nepal Army U-16
	FW	Darshan Adhikari	5 September 2008 (age 18)			(All Nepal Football Association) MMC U-16

== Competitive record ==
=== FIFA U-17 World Cup ===
In order to qualify for the FIFA U-17 World Cup, AFC teams must secure a berth (currently, semi-finals) through a continental tournament, the AFC U-17 Asian Cup.

FIFA U-17 World Cup finals record										FIFA U-17 World Cup qualifying record								
Year	Result	Pts	Pld	W	D	L	GF	GA	GD	Result	Pts	Pld	W	D	L	GF	GA	GD
(China) 1985 to (New Zealand) 1999	Did not qualify									Did not qualify								
(Trinidad and Tobago) 2001	Round 1									0	4	0	0	4	2	17	–15	
(Finland) 2003	Round 1									Did not qualify								
(Peru) 2005	Round 1									Did not qualify								
(South Korea) 2007	Round 1									Round 1	1	3	0	1	2	0	8	–8
(Nigeria) 2009	Round 1									Did not qualify								
(Mexico) 2011	Round 1									Did not qualify								
(United Arab Emirates) 2013	Round 1									Did not qualify								
(Chile) 2015	Round 1									Round 1	4	3	1	1	1	4	6	–2
(India) 2017	Disqualified									Disqualified; replaced by Oman	–	–	–	–	–	–	–	–
(Brazil) 2019 to (Qatar) 2026	did not qualify									Did not qualify								
(Qatar) 2027	disqualified due to FIFA suspension									Disqualified due to FIFA suspension								
Total	0	0	0	0	0	0	0	0	0	3/20	5	10	1	2	7	6	31	-25

=== AFC U-17 Asian Cup ===
AFC U-17 Asian Cup										AFC U-16 Championship qualifying record								
Year	Result	Pts	Pld	W	D	L	GF	GA	GD	Result	Pts	Pld	W	D	L	GF	GA	GD
(Qatar) 1985	Did not qualify									Group 2B (3rd)	5	4	2	1	1	5	7	–2
(Qatar) 1986	Did not qualify									Did not enter								
(Thailand) 1988	Did not qualify									Group 3 (4th)	2	4	1	0	3	1	11	–10
(United Arab Emirates) 1990	Did not qualify									Group 4 (2nd)	2	2	1	0	1	3	3	0
(Saudi Arabia) 1992	Did not qualify									Group 3 (2nd)	6	4	3	0	1	4	9	–5
(Qatar) 1994	Did not qualify									Did not enter								
(Thailand) 1996	Did not qualify									Did not enter								
(Qatar) 1998	Did not qualify									Group 5 (2nd)	6	3	2	0	1	11	1	+10
(Vietnam) 2000	Round 1	0	4	0	0	4	2	17	-15	Group 5 (1st)	9	3	3	0	0	15	3	+12
(United Arab Emirates) 2002	Did not qualify									Did not enter								
(Japan) 2004	Did not qualify									Group 6 (2nd)	4	2	1	1	0	3	1	+2
(Singapore) 2006	Round 1	1	3	0	1	2	0	8	-8	Group F (1st)	6	2	2	0	0	4	1	+3
(Uzbekistan) 2008	Did not qualify									Group B (4th)	3	4	1	0	3	7	10	–3
(Uzbekistan) 2010	Did not qualify									Group B (4th)	3	4	1	0	3	3	12	–9
(Iran) 2012	Did not qualify									Group D (4th)	1	3	0	1	2	1	5	−4
(Thailand) 2014	Round 1	4	3	1	1	1	4	6	-2	Group C (1st)	7	3	2	1	0	8	2	+6
(India) 2016	Disqualified									Group B(4th)	0	3	0	0	3	0	9	–9
(Malaysia) 2018	Did not qualify									Group D(4th)	1	3	0	1	2	3	5	–2
(Thailand) 2023	Did not qualify									Group F(4th)	0	3	0	0	3	2	12	–10
(Saudi Arabia) 2025	Did not qualify									Group F(4th)	0	3	0	0	3	2	15	–13
(Saudi Arabia) 2026	Did not qualify									Group G (5th)	0	4	0	0	4	2	15	–13
(Uzbekistan) 2027	Disqualified due to FIFA suspension									Disqualified due to FIFA suspension								
Total	3/21	5	10	1	2	7	6	31	-25	17/21	55	54	19	5	30	64	115	-55

=== SAFF U-17 Championship ===
Host/Year	Result	Pts	GP	W	D*	L	GF	GA	GD
(Nepal) 2011	Third place	4	4	2	2	0	9	2	+7
(Nepal) 2013	Runners-up	7	5	3	1	1	16	3	+13
(Bangladesh) 2015	Semi-finals	6	3	2	0	1	6	1	+5
(Nepal) 2017	Runners-up	3	4	2	0	2	12	6	+6
(Nepal) 2018	Fourth place	3	4	1	0	3	5	7	-2
(India) 2019	Runners-up	9	5	3	0	2	11	13	-2
(Sri Lanka) 2022	Runners-up	6	4	3	0	1	11	6	+5
(Bhutan) 2023	Group stage	0	2	0	0	2	0	2	-2
(Bhutan) 2024	3rd	6	4	2	0	2	8	6	+2
(Sri Lanka) 2025	TBD								
Total	10/10	40	35	18	3	14	78	46	+32

== Head-to-head record ==
The following table shows Nepal's head-to-head record in the AFC U-17 Asian Cup.

Opponent	Pld	W	D	L	GF	GA	GD	Win %
China	1	0	0	1	2	6	−4	0.00
Japan	2	0	0	2	0	9	−9	0.00
Kuwait	1	1	0	0	2	1	+1	100.00
Myanmar	1	0	0	1	0	3	−3	0.00
North Korea	1	0	0	1	1	4	−3	0.00
Singapore	1	0	1	0	0	0	+0	0.00
South Korea	1	0	0	1	0	2	−2	0.00
Uzbekistan	1	0	1	0	1	1	+0	0.00
Vietnam	1	0	0	1	0	5	−5	0.00
Total	10	1	2	7	6	31	−25	10.00

== See also ==
- Nepal national football team
- Nepal women's national football team
- Nepal national under-20 football team
- Football in Nepal
- AFC U-16 Championship
