= Maldives national under-17 football team =

National association football team

Maldives Under-17
- Nickname: Red Snappers
- Association: Football Association of Maldives
- Confederation: AFC (Asia)
- Sub-confederation: SAFF (South Asia)
- Head coach: Vacant
- Home stadium: Addu Football Stadium
- FIFA code: MDV
First colours	Second colours

FIFA U-17 World Cup
- Appearances: 0

AFC U-17 Asian Cup
- Appearances: 0

SAFF U-17 Championship
- Appearances: 8 (first in 2011)
- Best result: Group stage, 5 times

The Maldives national under-17 football team is the under-17 football team of the Maldives. The team participates in the U-17 football competitions in international football and is controlled by the Football Association of Maldives. The team has never qualified for the FIFA U-17 World Cup or the AFC U-17 Asian Cup. As of 2024, the team was coached by Mohamed Adam. It is qualified for the 2026 Asian Cup.

== Players ==
=== Current Squad ===
The following 23 players were selected for the most recent fixtures in the 2026 AFC U-17 Asian Cup qualification.

No.	Pos.	Player	Date of birth (age)	Club
1	GK	Shaiman Rashaad Rashaad		
18	GK	Mohamed Maail Moosa Moosa		
22	GK	Raaim Shiyam Ibrahim		(Football Association of Maldives) Super United
2	DF	Ahmed Aahil Athif		(Football Association of Maldives) Club Eagles
3	DF	Ahmed Amaan Amyn Amin		
15	DF	Abdul Khalig Aanish Abdulla Aslam		
20	DF	Aik Adam		
4	MF	Thaaiu Abdul Hakeem Hakeem		
5	MF	Daniyal Mohamed Didi Daniyal		
6	MF	Ibrahim Avsam Abdulla Avsam		
7	MF	Aakif bin Mohamed Aakif		
9	MF	Aidh Mohamed Jaweez		
10	MF	Abdulla Aaish Ali Aaish		
12	MF	Ali Ilaan Ahmed Ilaan (captain)		
13	MF	Looth bin Saud Looth		
14	MF	Hussain Ilhaam Ibrahim Ibrahim		
16	MF	Hussain Akmal Rasheed Rasheed		
17	MF	Ali Aflah Aneel Aneel		
21	MF	Aiman Ali Ali		
23	MF	Mohamed Vifaq Jadulla		(Football Association of Maldives) Super United
8	FW	Shaadhin Abdul Razzaq		
11	FW	Moosa Mikial Shakeeb		(Football Association of Maldives) Victory Sports Club
19	FW	Ehaan Bin ibrahim		(Football Association of Maldives) Super United

== Tournament records ==
=== FIFA U-17 World Cup Record ===
FIFA U-17 World Cup
Year	Round	PLD	W	D*	L	GS	GA
(China) 1985	Did not enter	-	-	-	-	-	-
(Canada) 1987	Did not enter	-	-	-	-	-	-
(Scotland) 1989	Did not enter	-	-	-	-	-	-
(Italy) 1991	Did not enter	-	-	-	-	-	-
(Japan) 1993	Did not qualify	-	-	-	-	-	-
(Ecuador) 1995	Did not enter	-	-	-	-	-	-
(Egypt) 1997	Did not enter	-	-	-	-	-	-
(New Zealand) 1999	Did not qualify	-	-	-	-	-	-
(Trinidad and Tobago) 2001	Did not enter	-	-	-	-	-	-
(Finland) 2003	Did not enter	-	-	-	-	-	-
(Peru) 2005	Did not qualify	-	-	-	-	-	-
(South Korea) 2007	Did not qualify	-	-	-	-	-	-
(Nigeria) 2009	Withdrew	-	-	-	-	-	-
(Mexico) 2011	Withdrew	-	-	-	-	-	-
(United Arab Emirates) 2013	Did not qualify	-	-	-	-	-	-
(Chile) 2015	Withdrew	-	-	-	-	-	-
(India) 2017	Did not qualify	-	-	-	-	-	-
(Brazil) 2019	Did not qualify	-	-	-	-	-	-
(Indonesia) 2023	Did not qualify	-	-	-	-	-	-
(Qatar) 2025	Did not qualify						
Total							

=== AFC U-17 Asian Cup Record ===
AFC U-17 Asian Cup
Year	Round	PLD	W	D*	L	GF	GA
(Qatar) 1985	Did not enter	-	-	-	-	-	-
(Qatar) 1986	Did not enter	-	-	-	-	-	-
(Thailand) 1988	Did not enter	-	-	-	-	-	-
(United Arab Emirates) 1990	Did not enter	-	-	-	-	-	-
(Saudi Arabia) 1992	Did not qualify	-	-	-	-	-	-
(Qatar) 1994	Did not enter	-	-	-	-	-	-
(Thailand) 1996	Did not enter	-	-	-	-	-	-
(Qatar) 1998	Did not qualify	-	-	-	-	-	-
(Vietnam) 2000	Did not qualify	-	-	-	-	-	-
(United Arab Emirates) 2002	Did not enter	-	-	-	-	-	-
(Japan) 2004	Did not qualify	-	-	-	-	-	-
(Singapore) 2006	Did not qualify	-	-	-	-	-	-
(Uzbekistan) 2008	Withdrew	-	-	-	-	-	-
(Uzbekistan) 2010	Withdrew	-	-	-	-	-	-
(Iran) 2012	Did not qualify	-	-	-	-	-	-
(Thailand) 2014	Withdrew	-	-	-	-	-	-
(India) 2016	Did not qualify	-	-	-	-	-	-
(Malaysia) 2018	Did not qualify	-	-	-	-	-	-
(Bahrain) 2020	Cancelled	-	-	-	-	-	-
(Thailand) 2023	Did not qualify	-	-	-	-	-	-
(Saudi Arabia) 2025	Did not qualify	-	-	-	-	-	-
Total							

=== SAFF U-16 Championship Record ===
SAFF U-17 Championship
Year	Host	Pos.	P	W	D*	L	GF	GA
2011	Nepal	6/6	2	0	0	2	0	11
2013	Nepal	0/6	Did not enter					
2015	Bangladesh	5/6	2	0	0	2	2	9
2017	Nepal	6/6	2	0	0	2	0	15
Total			6	0	0	6	2	35

*Draws include knockout matches decided on penalty kicks.
