= 2015 SAFF U-16 Championship =

Tournament details
- Host country: Bangladesh
- Dates: 9–18 August 2015
- Teams: 6 (from 1 confederation)
- Venue(s): Sylhet District Stadium (in Sylhet host cities)

Final positions
- Champions: Bangladesh (1st title)
- Runners-up: India

Tournament statistics
- Matches played: 9
- Goals scored: 28 (3.11 per match)
- Attendance: 96,646 (10,738 per match)
- Top scorer(s): (India) Saurabh Meher (3 goals)
- Best player(s): (Bangladesh) Sarwar Zaman Nipu

The 2015 SAFF U-16 Championship was the third edition of the SAFF U-16 Championship, an international football competition for men's under-16 national teams organized by SAFF. The tournament was hosted by Bangladesh from 9–18 of August, 2015 at Sylhet District Stadium. Six teams from the region were taking part, divided into two groups. Bangladesh U16 beat India U16 in the final and claimed the title for the first time.

== Participating teams ==
Team	Appearances in the SAFF U-16 Championship	Previous best performance
Afghanistan	2nd	Fourth place (2013)
Bangladesh (Host)	3rd	Third place (2013)
India	3rd	Champions (2013)
Maldives	2nd	Group Stage
Nepal	3rd	Runners-up (2013)
Sri Lanka	3rd	Group Stage

== Group draw ==
Group A	Group B
India; Bangladesh (Host); Sri Lanka	Nepal; Maldives; Afghanistan

== Venues ==
Sylhet	2015 SAFF U-16 Championship is located in Bangladesh
Sylhet District Stadium	2015 SAFF U-16 Championship is located in Bangladesh
Capacity: 18,000	2015 SAFF U-16 Championship is located in Bangladesh

== Match officials ==
Referees

- (Bangladesh) Rahman Dali
- (Bangladesh) Md. Anisur Rahman
- (India) L. Priyobrata Singh
- (Nepal) Nabindra Maharajan

Assistant referees

- (Bangladesh) Md Salim Miah
- (Bangladesh) Bitu Raj Barua
- (Bangladesh) Rahman Dali (Fourth Official)
- (Nepal) Nabindra Maharajan (Fourth Official)
- (Maldives) Ahmed Giyas
- (Afghanistan) Mohd Sharif Sarwari
- (India) L. Priyobrata Singh (Fourth Official)

Match Commissioner

- (Nepal) Gokul Thapa

Referee Assessor

- (India) Purushothaman Basker

General Coordinator

- (Bangladesh) Md Mohebul Kabir Rony

== Group stage ==
- All matches were played in Sylhet, Bangladesh.
- Times listed are UTC+06:00.

Key to colours in group tables
Group winners and runners-up advance to the semi-finals

=== Group A ===
Team	Pld	W	D	L	GF	GA	GD	Pts
Bangladesh	2	2	0	0	6	1	+5	6
India	2	1	0	1	6	2	+4	3
Sri Lanka	2	0	0	2	0	9	−9	0

9 August 2015
17:00 UTC+06:00

India	5–0	Sri Lanka
Meher 31', 49', 74'; Mohammed Afran 46' (o.g.); Shahjahan 66'	Report

Sylhet District Stadium, Sylhet
Attendance: 9,146
Referee: Nabindra Maharajan (Nepal)

11 August 2015
17:00 UTC+06:00

Bangladesh	4–0	Sri Lanka
Sarower Zaman Nipu 5', 87'; Rakib 61'; Atikuzzaman 77'	Report

Sylhet District Stadium, Sylhet
Attendance: 12,000
Referee: L. Priyobrata Singh (India)

13 August 2015
17:00 UTC+06:00

India	1–2	Bangladesh
Rahim 49'	Report	Mohammed Shawon 31'; Atikuzzaman 85' (pen.)

Sylhet District Stadium, Sylhet
Attendance: 18,000
Referee: Nabindra Maharajan (Nepal)

=== Group B ===
Team	Pld	W	D	L	GF	GA	GD	Pts
Nepal	2	2	0	0	6	0	+6	6
Afghanistan	2	1	0	1	4	3	+1	3
Maldives	2	0	0	2	2	9	−7	0

10 August 2015
17:00 UTC+06:00

Nepal	5–0	Maldives
Laxman Pariyar 3'; Prezen Tamang 18', 50'; Aryal 21', 90+5'	Report

Sylhet District Stadium, Sylhet
Attendance: 2,500
Referee: Rahman Dali (Bangladesh)

12 August 2015
17:00 UTC+06:00

Afghanistan	4–2	Maldives
Shayeq Hakeme 12'; Abdul Naser Amini 48', 54'; Sher Ahmed Hamidi 76'	Report	Yanish Adil 62'; Ismail Zaan Amir 86' (pen.)

Sylhet District Stadium, Sylhet
Attendance: 3,000
Referee: Md. Anisur Rahman (Bangladesh)

14 August 2015
17:30 UTC+06:00

Nepal	1–0	Afghanistan
Kshitiz Raj G.T 47'	Report

Sylhet District Stadium, Sylhet
Attendance: 2,000
Referee: Rahman Dali (Bangladesh)

== Knockout stage ==
Semi-finals
16 August – Sylhet
Bangladesh	1
Afghanistan	0
16 August – Sylhet
India	1
Nepal	0

Final
18 August – Sylhet
Bangladesh (p)	1 (4)
India	1 (2)

=== Semi-finals ===
16 August 2015
16:00 UTC+06:00

Bangladesh	1–0	Afghanistan
Saad 56'	Report

Sylhet District Stadium, Sylhet
Attendance: 20,000
Referee: L. Priyobrata Singh (India)

16 August 2015
19:00 UTC+06:00

India	1–0	Nepal
Rahim 22'	Report

Sylhet District Stadium, Sylhet
Attendance: 8,000
Referee: Md. Anisur Rahman (Bangladesh)

=== Final ===
18 August 2015
17:00 UTC+06:00

Bangladesh	1–1	India
Fahim Murshed 46'	Report	Amay Avinash Morajkar 63'
Penalties
Fahim Murshed (penalty scored); Jahangir Alam Sajeeb (penalty scored); Atikuzzaman (penalty scored); Saad (penalty scored)	4–2	(penalty scored) Meher; (penalty scored) Mohammed Rakib; (penalty missed) Abhijit; (penalty missed) Saqlain Khan

Sylhet District Stadium, Sylhet
Attendance: 22,000
Referee: Nabindra Maharajan (Nepal)

== Winner ==
2015 SAFF U-16 Championship

Bangladesh
First title

== Awards ==
The following awards were given for the 2015 SAFF U-16 Championship.

Fair Play Award	Man of the Final	Man of the Tournament	Golden Boot Award
Nepal	(Bangladesh) Shawon Hossain	(Bangladesh) Sarwar Zaman Nipu	(India) Saurabh Meher

== Goalscorers ==
3 goals

- (India) Saurabh Meher

2 goals

- (Afghanistan) Abdul Naser Amini
- (Bangladesh) Mohamed Atikuzzaman
- (Bangladesh) Sarower Zaman Nipu
- (India) Rahim Ali
- (Nepal) Suman Aryal
- (Nepal) Prezen Tamang

1 goal

- (Afghanistan) Shayeq Hakeme
- (Afghanistan) Sher Ahmed Hamidi
- (Bangladesh) Fahim Murshed
- (Bangladesh) M.M. Abedin Rakib
- (Bangladesh) Mohammed Shawon
- (Bangladesh) Saad Uddin
- (India) Amay Avinash Morajkar
- (India) Mohammed Shahjahan
- (Maldives) Yanish Adil
- (Maldives) Ismail Zaan Amir
- (Nepal) Laxman Pariyar
- (Nepal) Kshitiz Raj

1 own goal

- (Sri Lanka) Mohammed Afran (against India)
