= 2013 SAFF U-16 Championship =

Tournament details
- Host country: Nepal
- Dates: 20–30 July 2013
- Teams: 7
- Venue: 2 (in Kathmandu host cities)

Final positions
- Champions: India (1st title)
- Runners-up: Nepal
- Third place: Bangladesh

Tournament statistics
- Matches played: 13
- Goals scored: 35 (2.69 per match)
- Attendance: 26,091 (2,007 per match)
- Top scorer: (Nepal) Bimal Magar (6 goals)
- Best player: (India) Krishna Pandit

The 2013 SAFF U-16 Championship was the second edition of the SAFF U-16 Championship organized by South Asian Football Federation (SAFF). The tournament hosted by Nepal from 20 to 30 July at Dasarath Stadium and army ground. Seven teams from the region were participated in the tournament.

== Participated teams ==
The following seven nations participated in the tournament.

Team	Appearances in the SAFF U-16 Championship	Previous best performance
Bangladesh	2nd	Semi finals (2011)
Bhutan	1st	Group stages (2011)
India	2nd	Runner up (2011)
Maldives	2nd	Group stages (2011)
Nepal (Host)	2nd	Semi-finals (2011)
Pakistan	2nd	Champion (2011)
Sri Lanka	2nd	Group stages (2011)

== Group stage ==
- All matches were played in Kathmandu, Nepal.
- Times listed are UTC+05:45.

Key to colours in group tables
Group winners and runners-up advance to the semi-finals

=== Group A ===
Team	Pld	W	D	L	GF	GA	GD	Pts
Nepal	3	2	1	0	11	1	+10	7
Afghanistan	3	1	2	0	4	2	+2	5
Pakistan	3	0	2	1	0	3	-3	2
Bhutan	3	0	1	2	1	10	-9	1

20 July 2013
16:00 UTC+05:45

Nepal	7–0	Bhutan
B.Magar 48', 62', 63'; H.Magar 58', 76', 84'; Subedi 78'	Report

Dasarath Rangasala Stadium
Attendance: 1,500
Referee: Kasun Lakmal Weerakkody (Sri Lanka)
20 July 2013
16:00 UTC+05:45

Pakistan	0–0	Afghanistan
	Report

Army Ground, Kathmandu
Attendance: 2,379
Referee: Shrawan Lama (Nepal)

22 July 2013
16:00 UTC+05:45

Afghanistan	1–1	Nepal
A.Mansory 74'	Report	H.Magar 81'

Dasarath Rangasala Stadium
Attendance: 1,249
Referee: Kasun Lakmal Weerakkody (Sri Lanka)
22 July 2013
16:00 UTC+05:45

Bhutan	0–0	Pakistan
	Report

Army Ground, Kathmandu
Attendance: 3,341
Referee: Nabindra Maharjan (Nepal)

24 July 2013
16:00 UTC+05:45

Pakistan	0–3	Nepal
	Report	Limbu 13'; B.Magar 65', 73'

Dasarath Rangasala Stadium
Attendance: 2,164
Referee: Kasun Lakmal Weerakkody (Sri Lanka)
24 July 2013
16:00 UTC+05:45

Bhutan	1–3	Afghanistan
Shezang 18'	Report	Waziri 27'; Ahmad 63', 90+2'

Army Ground, Kathmandu
Attendance: 1,971
Referee: S. Borua (Bangladesh)

=== Group B ===
Team	Pld	W	D	L	GF	GA	GD	Pts
India	2	2	0	0	6	1	+5	6
Bangladesh	2	1	0	1	3	3	0	3
Sri Lanka	2	0	0	2	2	7	-5	0

21 July 2013
16:00 UTC+05:45

India	4–1	Sri Lanka
Pandit 21'; B. Singh 23', 90'; Prosenjit Chakraborty 66'	Report	Niresh 44'

Army Ground, Kathmandu
Attendance: 1,749
Referee: Rana Naseer Ahmed (Pakistan)

23 July 2013
16:00 UTC+05:45

Bangladesh	3–1	Sri Lanka
Tutul 28', 57'; Torikul Islam 81'	Report	Niresh 43'

Army Ground, Kathmandu
Attendance: 1,560
Referee: Kabin Byanjankar (Nepal)

25 July 2013
16:00 UTC+05:45

India	2–0	Bangladesh
B. Singh 43'; Pandit 90+2'	Report

Army Ground, Kathmandu
Attendance: 971
Referee: Shrawan Lama (Nepal)

== Knockout stage ==
=== Bracket ===
Semi-finals
27 July – Kathmandu
Bangladesh	1
Nepal	5
28 Julym – Kathmandu
India (p)	0 (4)
Afghanistan	0 (3)

Final
30 July – Kathmandu
Nepal	0
India	1
Third place match
30 July – Kathmandu
Afghanistan	0
Bangladesh	1

=== Semi-finals ===
27 July 2013
16:00 UTC+05:45

Nepal	5–1	Bangladesh
Limbu 8', 59'; B. Magar 20'; Bista 23'; Atikuzzaman 56' (o.g.)	Report	Sifat 65'

Dasarath Rangasala Stadium
Attendance: 1,746
Referee: Rana Naseer Ahmed (Pakistan)

28 July 2013
16:00 UTC+05:45

India	0–0	Afghanistan
	Report
Penalties
Pandit (penalty missed); Singh (penalty scored); Chakraborty (penalty scored); Tirkey (penalty scored); Rodrigues (penalty scored)	4–3	(penalty scored) Waziri; (penalty scored) Ahmad; (penalty missed) Jalal; (penalty scored) Sardari; (penalty missed) Rezahi

Army Ground, Kathmandu
Attendance: 1,400
Referee: Nabindra Maharajan (Nepal)

=== Third place ===
30 July 2013
13:30 UTC+05:45

Bangladesh	1–0	Afghanistan
Tushar 55'	Report

Army Ground, Kathmandu
Attendance: 1,642
Referee: Rana Naseer Ahmed (Pakistan)

=== Final ===
30 July 2013
15:30 UTC+05:45

Nepal	0–1	India
	Report	Lalrinzuala 18'

Dasarath Rangasala Stadium
Attendance: 4,419
Referee: Mizanur Rahman (Bangladesh)

== Awards ==
2013 SAFF U-16 Championship champions

India
First title
