= 2000 AFC U-16 Championship =

Tournament details
- Host country: Vietnam
- City: Đà Nẵng
- Dates: 3–17 September
- Teams: 10 (from 1 confederation)
- Venues: 2 (in 1 host city)

Final positions
- Champions: Oman (2nd title)
- Runners-up: Iran
- Third place: Japan
- Fourth place: Vietnam

Tournament statistics
- Matches played: 24
- Goals scored: 95 (3.96 per match)
- Best player: (Vietnam) Phạm Văn Quyến

The 2000 AFC U-16 Championship was the 9th AFC U-16 Championship, which was held between 3 and 17 September 2000 in Vietnam. Oman defeated Iran in the final round.

== Qualification ==
- Group 1 : Oman
- Group 2 : Kuwait
- Group 3 : Iran
- Group 4 : Bangladesh
- Group 5 : Nepal
- Group 6 : Thailand
- Group 7 : China
- Group 8 : Japan
- Group 9 : Myanmar
- Host : Vietnam

== Venue ==
All matches were held in Chi Lăng Stadium, Da Nang, Vietnam.

== Group stage ==
=== Group A ===
Pos	Team	Pld	W	D	L	GF	GA	GD	Pts	Qualification
1	Japan	4	4	0	0	14	1	+13	12	Knockout stage
2	Vietnam	4	2	1	1	9	5	+4	7	Knockout stage
3	China	4	2	0	2	13	12	+1	6	
4	Myanmar	4	1	1	2	4	7	−3	4	
5	Nepal	4	0	0	4	2	17	−15	0	

3 September 2000

China	6–2	Nepal

3 September 2000

Vietnam	0–2	Japan

5 September 2000

Myanmar	0–2	Japan

5 September 2000

Nepal	0–5	Vietnam

7 September 2000

Myanmar	0–4	China

7 September 2000

Japan	3–0	Nepal

9 September 2000

Nepal	0–3	Myanmar

9 September 2000

China	2–3	Vietnam

11 September 2000

Japan	7–1	China

11 September 2000

Vietnam	1–1	Myanmar

=== Group B ===
Pos	Team	Pld	W	D	L	GF	GA	GD	Pts	Qualification
1	Iran	4	4	0	0	12	2	+10	12	Knockout stage
2	Oman	4	3	0	1	11	7	+4	9	Knockout stage
3	Bangladesh	4	2	0	2	4	7	−3	6	
4	Thailand	4	1	0	3	4	9	−5	3	
5	Kuwait	4	0	0	4	6	12	−6	0	

4 September 2000

Thailand	3–2	Kuwait

4 September 2000

Oman	1–2	Iran

6 September 2000

Iran	3–0	Thailand

6 September 2000

Bangladesh	1–0	Kuwait

8 September 2000

Bangladesh	1–3	Oman

8 September 2000

Kuwait	1–3	Iran

10 September 2000

Iran	4–0	Bangladesh

10 September 2000

Oman	2–1	Thailand

12 September 2000

Kuwait	3–5	Oman

12 September 2000

Thailand	0–2	Bangladesh

== Knockout stage ==
=== Semi finals ===
15 September 2000

Japan	2–3	Oman

15 September 2000

Iran	4–0	Vietnam

=== Third place match ===
17 September 2000

Japan	4–2	Vietnam

=== Final ===
17 September 2000

Iran	0–1	Oman

== Winners ==
AFC U-16 Championship 2000 winners

Oman
Second title

== Teams qualifying for the 2001 FIFA U-17 World Championship ==
- Oman
- Iran
- Japan

== X-ray tests and bans ==
In May 2001, 16 players were banned from international football for 2 years following X-ray tests that suggested they were at least 19 years old. Of the teams involved, Oman had 6 players banned, Iran 5, Bangladesh 3 and Thailand 2. Nepal did not allow its players to be tested. These five teams were banned from the next edition of the tournament.

Despite the disciplines, the final results of the tournament were not changed due to the draws were already taken place before the ban and the finalists Iran and Oman both participated in the 2001 FIFA U-17 World Championship. At the tournament held in Trinidad and Tobago, both sides failed to make it past the group stage as well as Japan, with Iran losing every match they played and Oman only drawing once.
