= 1998 AFC U-16 Championship =

بطولة آسيا تحت 16 سنة لكرة القدم 1998

Tournament details
- Host country: Qatar
- Dates: 3–17 September
- Teams: 10 (from 1 confederation)
- Venue: 1 (in 1 host city)

Final positions
- Champions: Thailand (1st title)
- Runners-up: Qatar
- Third place: Bahrain
- Fourth place: South Korea

Tournament statistics
- Matches played: 34
- Goals scored: 90 (2.65 per match)

1998 AFC U-16 Championship was the 8th edition of the AFC U-16 Championship. Qatar hosted the tournament from 3 to 17 September 1998. The top two teams qualified for the 1999 FIFA U-17 World Championship in New Zealand.

== Qualification ==
The following 10 teams qualified for the final tournament:

- Group 1: Oman
- Group 2: Iran
- Group 3: Bahrain
- Group 4: North Korea
- Group 5: Bangladesh
- Group 6: Iraq
- Group 7: South Korea
- Group 8: Japan
- Group 9: Thailand
- Host: Qatar

== Venues ==
All matches were held in Grand Hamad Stadium in the city of Doha.

Doha	Location of the host city of the 1998 AFC U-16 Championship.
Grand Hamad Stadium	Location of the host city of the 1998 AFC U-16 Championship.
Capacity: 13,000	Location of the host city of the 1998 AFC U-16 Championship.

== Group stage ==
Group winners and runners-up advanced to the semifinals.

=== Group A ===
Team	Pld	W	D	L	GF	GA	GD	Pts
Qatar	4	3	1	0	9	3	+6	10
Thailand	4	2	1	1	6	6	0	7
Iraq	4	2	0	2	9	4	+5	6
North Korea	4	2	0	2	5	6	−1	6
Iran	4	0	0	4	1	11	−10	0

3 September 1998

Qatar	4–0	Iran

4 September 1998

Iraq	3–0	North Korea

5 September 1998

Iran	1–2	Thailand

6 September 1998

Qatar	3–2	North Korea

8 September 1998

Thailand	3–2	Iraq

8 September 1998

North Korea	1–0	Iran

9 September 1998

Qatar	1–0	Iraq

10 September 1998

Thailand	0–2	North Korea

11 September 1998

Iran	0–4	Iraq

12 September 1998

Thailand	1–1	Qatar

=== Group B ===
Team	Pld	W	D	L	GF	GA	GD	Pts
Bahrain	4	3	0	1	9	6	+3	9
South Korea	4	3	0	1	8	6	+2	9
Japan	4	2	1	1	8	6	+2	7
Bangladesh	4	0	2	2	4	7	−3	2
Oman	4	0	1	3	3	7	−4	1

4 September 1998

Oman	1–1	Bangladesh

4 September 1998

Japan	1–2	South Korea

5 September 1998

Bangladesh	0–2	Bahrain

6 September 1998

South Korea	1–0	Oman

7 September 1998

Bahrain	1–2	Japan

8 September 1998

Bangladesh	1–2	South Korea

9 September 1998

Japan	3–1	Oman

10 September 1998

Bahrain	4–3	South Korea

11 September 1998

Japan	2–2	Bangladesh

12 September 1998

Bahrain	2–1	Oman

== Knockout stage ==
=== Semifinals ===
15 September 1998

Qatar	2–1	South Korea
Ibrahim Salmeen 34'; Hamza 39'		Choi Sung-yong 55'

15 September 1998

Bahrain	0–6	Thailand

=== Third place match ===
17 September 1998

Bahrain	5–1	South Korea

=== Final ===
17 September 1998

Thailand	1–1 (a.e.t.)	Qatar
Penalties
	3–2

== Winners ==
1998 AFC U-16 Championship winners

Thailand
1st title

== Teams qualified for 1999 FIFA U-17 World Championship ==
- Thailand
- Qatar

=== Inter-confederation playoff ===
Third-placed Bahrain played off against Australia, winners of the 1999 OFC U-17 championship for the final slot for the 1999 FIFA U-17 World Championship.

14 August 1999

Australia	2–1	Bahrain

Canberra, Australia
27 August 1999

Bahrain	0–1	Australia

Manama, Bahrain

Australia won 3–1 on aggregate and qualified for the 1999 FIFA U-17 World Championship.

== Sources ==
- rsssf.com
