= 2011 SAFF U-16 Championship =

Tournament details
- Host country: Nepal
- Dates: 1–10 August 2011
- Teams: 6
- Venue: 1 (in Kathmandu host cities)

Final positions
- Champions: Pakistan (1st title)
- Runners-up: India

Tournament statistics
- Matches played: 11
- Goals scored: 42 (3.82 per match)
- Attendance: 33,173 (3,016 per match)
- Top scorer: (Pakistan) Mohamad Bilal (4 Goals)
- Best player: (Pakistan) Mansoor Khan

The 2011 SAFF U-16 Championship was the first edition of the SAFF U-16 Championship hosted by Nepal from 1 to 10 August 2011 at Dasarath Stadium. Six teams from the region participated in the tournament.

Pakistan became the 2011 champions after beating India 2–1 in the final on 10 August 2011. Pakistan's Mohammad Bilal was the top scorer with 4 goals. Mansoor Khan, also from Pakistan, was declared the tournament's best player.

== Participated teams ==
The following six nations participated in the tournament.

Team	Appearances in the SAFF U-16 Championship	Previous best performance
Bangladesh	1st	Debut
India	1st	Debut
Maldives	1st	Debut
Nepal (Host)	1st	Debut
Pakistan	1st	Debut
Sri Lanka	1st	Debut

== Group stage ==
=== Group A ===
Team	Pld	W	D	L	GF	GA	GD	Pts
Pakistan	2	2	0	0	7	0	+7	6
India	2	1	0	1	5	1	+4	3
Maldives	2	0	0	2	0	11	−11	0

1 August 2011
15:30 NST

Pakistan	1–0	India
Khan 20'	Report

Dasarath Stadium, Kathmandu
Attendance: 4,806
Referee: F. Ahamed (Bangladesh)

3 August 2011
15:30 NST

Maldives	0–6	Pakistan
	Report	Mohamad Bilal 5', 56', 84', 90'; Sher Ali 79', 80'

Dasarath Stadium, Kathmandu
Attendance: 1,631
Referee: Alamgir Khan (Bangladesh)

5 August 2011
15:30 NST

India	5–0	Maldives
Lalhimpuia 31'; Raja Rawat 36'; Laldanta Sanga 45+2', 54'; Prokash Majumdar 63'	Report

Dasarath Stadium, Kathmandu
Attendance: 2,346
Referee: Dulal Mridha (Bangladesh)

=== Group B ===
Team	Pld	W	D	L	GF	GA	GD	Pts
Nepal	2	1	1	0	6	0	+6	4
Bangladesh	2	1	1	0	6	2	+4	4
Sri Lanka	2	0	0	2	2	12	−10	0

2 August 2011
15:30 NST

Bangladesh	6–2	Sri Lanka
Mohamad Mezbahuddin 8', 40', 64'; Mohamad Ali 14'; Akash Shaha 15'; Mohammad Sabbir 57'	Report	Johar Mohammad 68', 86'

Dasarath Stadium, Kathmandu
Attendance: 4,468
Referee: P. Singh (India)

4 August 2011
15:30 NST

Nepal	0–0	Bangladesh
	Report

Dasarath Stadium, Kathmandu
Attendance: 4,870
Referee: Ashish Roy (India)

6 August 2011
15:30 NST

Sri Lanka	0–6	Nepal
	Report	Lama 14', 58'; Rai 48'; Shrestha 48'; Magar 68', 70'

Dasarath Stadium, Kathmandu
Attendance: 1,841
Referee: Amin Bepari (Bangladesh)

== Knockout stage ==
=== Bracket ===
Semi-finals
8 August – Kathmandu
Bangladesh	0
Pakistan	2
8 August – Kathmandu
India (p)	1 (4)
Nepal	1 (2)

Final
10 August – Kathmandu
Pakistan	2
India	1
Third place match
10 August – Kathmandu
Nepal	2
Bangladesh	1

== Semi-finals ==
8 August 2011
13:00 NST

Bangladesh	0–2	Pakistan
	Report	Khan 89'; Sher Ali 90'

Dasarath Stadium, Kathmandu
Attendance: 4,611
Referee: Prakash Roy (India)

8 August 2011
15:30 NST

India	1–1 (a.e.t.)	Nepal
Nitin Jayal 90'	Report	Rishi Thapa 20'
Penalties
Lalrammuana (penalty missed); Sanga (penalty scored); Saha (penalty scored); Mendes (penalty scored); Singh (penalty scored)	4–2	(penalty scored) Thapa; (penalty scored) Aditya; (penalty missed) Umesh; (penalty missed) Sagar; (penalty missed) Bibek

Dasarath Stadium, Kathmandu
Attendance: 3,164
Referee: S. Banarjee (Bangladesh)

== Fifth place playoff ==
9 August 2011
13:30 NST

Maldives	2–0	Sri Lanka
Rizuhaan Ibrahim 14'; Rasheed Ahmed 61'	Report

Dasarath Stadium, Kathmandu
Attendance: 941
Referee: B. Torofdar (Bangladesh)

== Third place match ==
10 August 2011

Nepal	2–1	Bangladesh

Dasarath Stadium, Kathmandu
Attendance: 1,549
Referee: R. Rashid (Bangladesh)

== Final ==
10 August 2011
15:30 NST

Pakistan	2–1	India
Muhammad Zeeshan 23'; M. Khan 50'	Report	Lalhimpuia 44'

Dasarath Stadium, Kathmandu
Attendance: 2,946
Referee: S. Borua (Bangladesh)

== Awards ==
2011 SAFF U-16 Championship champions

Pakistan
First title

== Goalscorers ==
There have been 42 goals scored in 11 matches, for an average of 3.82 goals per match.

4 goals

- (Pakistan) Mohamad Bilal

3 goals

- (Bangladesh) Mohamad Mezbahuddin
- (Pakistan) Mohamed Ali

2 goals

- (Pakistan) Sher Ali

1 goal

- (Nepal) Suman Lama
- (India) Daniel Lalhlimpuia
- (Pakistan) Mansoor Khan
- (Bangladesh) Mohamad Ali
- (Bangladesh) Akash Shaha
- (Bangladesh) Mohammad Sabbir
