= 2024–25 in Indian football =

Football in India
- Season: 2024–25

Men's football
- ISL: Shield: Mohun Bagan SG; Cup: Mohun Bagan SG
- I-League: Inter Kashi
- I-League 2: Diamond Harbour
- I-League 3: Diamond Harbour
- Super Cup: Goa
- Durand Cup: NorthEast United

Women's football
- IWL: East Bengal
- IWL 2: Garhwal United

The 2024–25 season was the 137th competitive association football season in India. The domestic season begins in July 2024.

== Season summary ==
- Indian Football competition calendar ‘24–25 to begin with Durand Cup in July though Indian Footballing Calendar runs through June-July session.
- A nine-month window for AIFF Youth Leagues U13 / U15 / U17.
- Super Cup in March-May 2025 window.
- IWL gets a 6-month window.

== Men's national football team ==
=== Senior team ===
The following is a list of match results in the 2024–25 season, as well as any future matches that have been scheduled in the season.

Win Draw Loss Fixture

=== 2024 ===
6 June 2024 2026 World Cup qualification	India	0–0	Kuwait	Kolkata, India
19:00 UTC+5:30		Report		Stadium: Salt Lake Stadium; Attendance: 58,932; Referee: Fu Ming (China)

11 June 2024 2026 World Cup qualification	Qatar	2–1	India	Al Rayyan, Qatar
18:45 UTC+3	Aymen 73'; Al-Rawi 90'	Report	Chhangte 37'	Stadium: Ahmad bin Ali Stadium; Attendance: 2,816; Referee: Kim Woosung (South Korea)

3 September 2024 2024 Intercontinental Cup	India	0–0	Mauritius	Hyderabad, India
19:30 IST (UTC+05:30)		Report		Stadium: G. M. C. Balayogi Athletic Stadium; Attendance: 18,976; Referee: Mohamed Javiz (Maldives)

9 September 2024 2024 Intercontinental Cup	India	0–3	Syria	Hyderabad, India
19:30 IST (UTC+05:30)		Report	Al Aswad 7'; Irandust 76'; Sabbag 90+6'	Stadium: G. M. C. Balayogi Athletic Stadium; Attendance: 19,982; Referee: Nivon Robesh (Sri Lanka)

9 October 2024 2024 VFF Tri-Nations Series	Vietnam	Cancelled	India	Nam Dinh, Vietnam
18:00 UTC+7				Stadium: Thiên Trường Stadium
Note: Tournament cancelled due to Lebanon pulling out following the 2024 Israeli invasion of Lebanon

12 October 2024 2024 VFF Tri-Nations Series	Lebanon	Cancelled	India	Nam Dinh, Vietnam
18:00 UTC+7				Stadium: Thiên Trường Stadium
Note: Tournament cancelled due to Lebanon pulling out following the 2024 Israeli invasion of Lebanon

12 October 2024 Friendly	Vietnam	1–1	India	Nam Dinh, Vietnam
18:00 UTC+7	Bùi Vĩ Hào 38'	Report	Choudhary 53'	Stadium: Thiên Trường Stadium; Attendance: 8,239; Referee: Choi Hyunjai (South Korea)

18 November 2024 Friendly	India	1–1	Malaysia	Hyderabad, India
19:30 UTC+5:30	Bheke 39'	Report	Josué 19'	Stadium: G. M. C. Balayogi Athletic Stadium; Attendance: 15,367; Referee: Thoriq Alkatiri (Indonesia)

=== 2025 ===
19 March 2025 Friendly	India	3–0	Maldives	Shillong, India
19:00 UTC+5:30	Bheke 34'; Colaço 66'; Chhetri 76'	Report		Stadium: Jawaharlal Nehru Stadium; Attendance: 6,798; Referee: Prajwol Chhetri (Nepal)

25 March 2025 2027 ACQ – 3R	India	0–0	Bangladesh	Shillong, India
19:00 UTC+5:30		Report		Stadium: Jawaharlal Nehru Stadium; Attendance: 14,952; Referee: Hussein Abo Yehia (Lebanon)

4 June 2025 Friendly	Thailand	2–0	India	Rangsit, Thailand
19:30 7:00	Davis 8'; Poramet 59'	Report		Stadium: Thammasat Stadium; Attendance: 2,181; Referee: Tam Ping Wun (Hong Kong)

10 June 2025 2027 ACQ – 3R	Hong Kong	1–0	India	Kowloon, Hong Kong
	Pereira 90+4' (pen.)			Stadium: Kai Tak Sports Park; Attendance: 42,570; Referee: Ahmad Alaeddin (Lebanon)

=== Under-23 ===
==== 2025 ====
18 June 2025 Friendly	Tajikistan	3–2	India	Tursunzoda, Tajikistan
20:30 IST (UTC+05:30)	Khabibov 59'; Davlatov 90+1'; Azizboev 90+5'	Report	S. Bhat 33'; Chhetri (yellow card) 20' (yellow-red card) 56'; Gogoi 85'	Stadium: TALCO Arena

21 June 2025 Friendly	India	0–0	Kyrgyzstan	Hisor, Tajikistan
20:30 IST (UTC+05:30)		Report		Stadium: Hisor Central Stadium; Referee: Abdullo Davlatov (Tajikistan)

=== Under-20 ===
==== 2024 SAFF U-20 Championship ====
19 August 2024 2024 SAFF U-20 GS	Bhutan	0–1	India	Lalitpur, Nepal
14:45 IST	Gyeltshen (red card) 69'	Report	Molla 37'; Guite (red card) 69'; Pramveer (red card) 69'	Stadium: ANFA Complex; Attendance: 223; Referee: Shyamlal Danuwar (Nepal)

23 August 2024 2024 SAFF U-20 GS	India	1–0	Maldives	Lalitpur, Nepal
14:45 IST	Kipgen 90+5'	Report		Stadium: ANFA Complex; Attendance: 440; Referee: Mohamed Jafran Athambawa (Sri Lanka)

26 August 2024 2024 SAFF U-20 SF	India	1–1 (3–4 p)	Bangladesh	Lalitpur, Nepal
14:45 IST	Meetei 75'	Report	Molla 36'; Marma Aky (yellow card) 90+5' (yellow-red card) 90+5'	Stadium: ANFA Complex; Attendance: 3,243; Referee: Shyamlal Danuwar (Nepal)
	Penalties
	Gangte (penalty missed); Pramveer (penalty scored); Goyary (penalty scored); Parmar (penalty scored); Tirkey (penalty missed)		(penalty scored) Nova; (penalty scored) Moin; (penalty scored) Topu; (penalty scored) Asif

==== 2025 AFC U-20 Asian Cup qualification ====
25 September 2024 2025 AFC U-20 ACQ	Mongolia	1–4	India	Vientiane, Laos
14:30 IST	Tumen-Ulziy (red card) 28'; Uuganbat 45'	Report	Kelvin 20'; Kipgen 51', 54'; Korou 85'	Stadium: New Laos National Stadium; Attendance: 132; Referee: Wong Wai Lun (Hong Kong)

27 September 2024 2025 AFC U-20 ACQ	India	0–1	Iran	Vientiane, Laos
14:30 IST		Report	Mazraeh 88'	Stadium: New Laos National Stadium; Attendance: 142; Referee: Asker Nadjafaliyev (Uzbekistan)

29 September 2024 2025 AFC U-20 ACQ	India	2–0	Laos	Vientiane, Laos
17:30 IST	Goyary 69'; Gangte 84'	Report		Stadium: New Laos National Stadium; Attendance: 3,323; Referee: Shukri Al-Hunfush (Saudi Arabia)

==== 2025 Mandiri U20 Challenge Series ====
24 January 2025 U20 Challenge Series	India	1–6	Syria	Sidoarjo, Indonesia
14:30 IST	M. Malngiang 63'	Report	A. Al-Dahan 4', 45+2'; M. Ramadan 15'; Hassan Mahmoud 36'; Homam Mahmoud 48', 62'	Stadium: Gelora Delta Stadium

27 January 2025 U20 Challenge Series	Jordan	5–0	India	Sidoarjo, Indonesia
14:30 IST	Al-Fakhouri 45+1', 45+2'; Sabra 48'; Youssef Al-Maqableh 69'; Omar Khadr 90'	Report		Stadium: Gelora Delta Stadium

30 January 2025 U20 Challenge Series	Indonesia	4–0	India	Sidoarjo, Indonesia
18:00 IST	Toni Firmansyah 4'; Muhammad Ragil 46', 60'; Muhammad Iqbal Gwijangge 76'	Report		Stadium: Gelora Delta Stadium

==== 2025 SAFF U-19 Championship ====
9 May 2025 2025 SAFF U-19 GS	India	8–0	Sri Lanka	Yupia, India
17:00 IST	Prashan Jajo 17', 62'; Danny Meitei 26', 31', 50'; Mohammed Arbas 41'; Omang Dodum 49'; S. Shami 81'	Report		Stadium: Golden Jubilee Stadium; Attendance: 5,328; Referee: S.M. Jasim Akhter (Bangladesh)

13 May 2025 2025 SAFF U-19 GS	India	4–0	Nepal	Yupia, India
17:00 IST	Thangjam Roshan Singh 28'; Omang Dodum 29'; Rohen Singh 75'; Danny Meitei 83'	Report		Stadium: Golden Jubilee Stadium; Attendance: 2,500; Referee: Zaheer Hussain (Maldives)

16 May 2025 2025 SAFF U-19 SF	India	3–0	Maldives	Yupia, India
19:30	Meitei 14'; Dodum 21'; Jajo 66'	Report		Stadium: Golden Jubilee Stadium; Attendance: 5,126; Referee: SM Jasim Akhter (Bangladesh)

16 May 2025 2025 SAFF U-19 F	Bangladesh	1–1 (3–4 p)	India	Yupia, India
19:30	Ahmed 61'	Report	Shami 2'	Stadium: Golden Jubilee Stadium; Attendance: 12,789; Referee: Md Jafran Athambawa (Sri Lanka)
	Penalties
	Chowdhury (penalty scored); Mursed (penalty scored); Ahmed (penalty scored); Faysal (penalty missed); Sahed (penalty missed)		(penalty scored) Arbash; (penalty missed) R. Singh; (penalty scored) N. R. Singh; (penalty scored) Abranches; (penalty scored) Shami

=== Under-17 ===
23 August 2024 Friendly	Bali United U20 (Indonesia)	2–2	India	Badung, Indonesia
		Report	Sami; Arbash	Stadium: Samudra Kuta Stadium

25 August 2024 Friendly	Indonesia	3–1	India	Gianyar, Indonesia
20:00 UTC+8	Evandra 14' (pen.); Fandi 50'; Mierza 62'		Zangminlun 52'	Stadium: I Wayan Dipta Stadium; Referee: Thoriq Alkatiri (Indonesia)

27 August 2024 Friendly	India	1–0	Indonesia	Gianyar, Indonesia
18:00 UTC+5:30	Brahmacharimayum 78'			Stadium: Kapten I Wayan Dipta Stadium; Referee: Ryan Nanda Saputra (Indonesia)

20 September 2024 2024 SAFF U-17 GS	Bangladesh	0–1	India	Thimphu, Bhutan
17:30		Report	Sumit Sharma Brahmacharimayum 90+1'	Stadium: Changlimithang Stadium; Attendance: 300; Referee: Pema Tshewang (Bhutan)

24 September 2024 2024 SAFF U-17 GS	India	3–0	Maldives	Thimphu, Bhutan
17:30	Samson Ahongshangban 13'; Hemneichung Lunkim 74', 89'	Report		Stadium: Changlimithang Stadium; Attendance: 60; Referee: Sashanka Madushanka (Sri Lanka)

28 September 2024 2024 SAFF U-17 SF	India	4–2	Nepal	Thimphu, Bhutan
13:30	Vishal Yadav 61', 68'; Ningthou Khongjam Rishi Singh 85'; Hemneichung Lunkim 90+5'	Report	Subash Bam 82'; Mohammed Kaif 89' (o.g.)	Stadium: Changlimithang Stadium; Attendance: 82; Referee: Md Symoon Hasan Sany (Bangladesh)

30 September 2024 2024 SAFF U-17 F	India	2–0	Bangladesh	Thimphu, Bhutan
17:30	Mohammed Kaif 58'; Mohammed Arbash 90+5'	Report		Stadium: Changlimithang Stadium; Attendance: 1230; Referee: Sashanka Madushanka (Sri Lanka)

23 October 2024 2025 AFC U-17 ACQ	India	13–0	Brunei	Chonburi province, Thailand
16:00 UTC+7				Stadium: Chonburi Stadium

25 October 2024 2025 AFC U-17 ACQ	Turkmenistan	0–1	India	Chonburi province, Thailand
16:00 UTC+7				Stadium: Chonburi Stadium

27 October 2024 2025 AFC U-17 ACQ	Thailand	3–2	India	Chonburi province, Thailand
20:00 UTC+7				Stadium: Chonburi Stadium

== Women's national football team ==
=== Senior team ===
The following is a list of match results in the 2024–25 season, as well as any future matches that have been scheduled in the season.

Legend

Win Draw Loss Void or postponed Fixtures

==== 2024 ====
4 June Friendly	Uzbekistan	0–0	India	Tashkent, Uzbekistan
17:00 UTC+5		Report		Stadium: Milliy Stadium; Attendance: 64

9 July Friendly	Myanmar	2–1	India	Yangon, Myanmar
--:-- UTC+6:30	Win Theingi Tun 14'; San Thaw Thaw 74'	Report	Xaxa 58'	Stadium: Thuwunna Stadium

12 July Friendly	Myanmar	1–1	India	Yangon, Myanmar
--:-- UTC+6:30	Win Theingi Tun 50'	Report	Pyari Xaxa 48'	Stadium: Thuwunna Stadium

17 October 2024 SAFF W GS	Pakistan	2–5	India	Kathmandu, Nepal
	Hirani 45+2' (pen.); Siddiqi 47'	Report	Dangmei 5', 42'; Manisha 17'; Bala Devi 35'; Chouhan 78'	Stadium: Dashrath Stadium; Attendance: 452; Referee: Anjana Rai (Nepal)

23 October 2024 SAFF W GS	India	1–3	Bangladesh	Kathmandu, Nepal
17:30	Bala Devi 43'	Report	Afeida Khandaker 19'; Tohura 29', 42'	Stadium: Dashrath Stadium; Attendance: 251; Referee: Choki Om (Bhutan)

27 October 2024 SAFF W SF	Nepal	1–1 (4–2 p)	India	Kathmandu, Nepal
18:30	Bhandari 66'	Report	Basfore 62'	Stadium: Dashrath Stadium; Attendance: 18,009; Referee: Choki Om (Bhutan)
	Penalties
	Bhandari (penalty scored); Rana (penalty scored); Magar (penalty scored); Karki (penalty scored)		(penalty missed) Ashalata Devi; (penalty scored) Manisha; (penalty scored) Shirvoikar; (penalty missed) Ranjana Chanu

30 December Friendly	India	14–0	Maldives	Bengaluru, India
15:30	Xaxa 7', 8', 15'; Lynda Kom 12', 21', 29', 52'; Neha Sillay 16', 45'; Basfore 51'; Ranjana 54'; Kajol 59', 66'; Rimpa 62'	Report		Stadium: Padukone – Dravid Centre for Sports Excellence; Referee: Kanika Barman (India)

==== 2025 ====
2 January Friendly	India	11–1	Maldives	Bengaluru, India
15:30	Lhingdeikim 12', 16', 56', 59'; Kajol 15'; Hawwa Haneefa 17' (o.g.); Pooja 41'; Sibani Devi 45+1'; Simran 62', 68'; Bhumika Devi 71' (pen.)	Report	Mariyam Rifa 27'	Stadium: Padukone – Dravid Centre for Sports Excellence; Referee: Ranjita Devi Tekcham (India)

20 February 2025 Pink Ladies Cup	Jordan	0–2	India	Al Hamriyah, UAE
16:30		Report	Priyangka Devi 23'; Manisha Kalyan 54'	Stadium: Al Hamriya Sports Club Stadium

23 February 2025 Pink Ladies Cup	Russia	2–0	India	Al Hamriyah, UAE
20:30	Zhukova 25'; Smirnova 90+2'	Report		Stadium: Al Hamriya Sports Club Stadium; Referee: Khudum Bhit Khulud (United Arab Emirates)

26 February 2025 Pink Ladies Cup	India	0–3	South Korea	Al Hamriyah, UAE
12:30		Report	Choi Yoo-jung 8'; Choi Dak-yeong 27'; Moon Eun-ju 81'	Stadium: Al Hamriya Sports Club Stadium

30 May Friendly	Uzbekistan	1–0	India	Bengaluru, India
16:30	Khabibullaeva 56'	Report		Stadium: Padukone-Dravid Centre for Sports Excellence; Referee: Kim Yu-jeong (South Korea)

3 June Friendly	India	0–1	Uzbekistan	Bengaluru, India
16:30		Report	Kudratova 49'	Stadium: Padukone-Dravid Centre for Sports Excellence; Referee: Cha Min-ji (South Korea)

=== Under-20 ===
==== 2025 ====
19 February Pink Ladies U20 Youth Cup	India	2–1	Jordan	Manavgat, Turkey
17:30 UTC+5:30	Lhingdeikim Kipgen 63'; Pooja 77'	Report	Jinan Said (pen.), 35'	Stadium: Arslan Zeki Demirci Sports Complex

22 February Pink Ladies U20 Youth Cup	India	1–0	Hong Kong	Manavgat, Turkey
17:30 UTC+5:30	Sibani Nongmeikapam 53'	Report		Stadium: Arslan Zeki Demirci Sports Complex

25 February Pink Ladies U20 Youth Cup	India	0–3	Russia	Manavgat, Turkey
17:30 UTC+5:30		Report	Mariia Nachaeva 15'; Polina Pavlova 17'; Natalia Perminova 47'	Stadium: Arslan Zeki Demirci Sports Complex

== Women's national futsal team ==
=== Senior team ===
The following is a list of match results in the 2024–25 season, as well as any future matches that have been scheduled in the season.

15 January 2025 2025 AFC Qual	Hong Kong	5–0	India	Yogyakarta
				Stadium: Among Rogo Sports Hall

17 January 2025 2025 AFC Qual	Indonesia	6–0	India	Yogyakarta
				Stadium: Among Rogo Sports Hall

19 January 2025 2025 AFC Qual	India	3–4	Kyrgyzstan	Yogyakarta
				Stadium: Among Rogo Sports Hall

== International club competitions ==
=== Friendly games (Next Gen Cup) ===
Team 1	Score	Team 2
Kinetic Academy (England)	2-1	(India) Muthoot
Tonbridge Angels (England)	1-4	(India) Punjab
Luton Town (England)	0-3	(India) East Bengal

==== League stage ====
The league stage consists of eight teams with each team playing against any three of the seven other teams only. These teams are pre-seeded into two groups and the placement matches are decided via their positions in those respective groups. Aside from regular match and scoring system, a penalty shootout is held after each match, irrespective of the regular match. The winner of the penalty shootout gets an additional bonus point in their points table.

Pos	Grp	Team	Pld	W	PW	D	PL	L	GF	GA	GD	Pts	Qualification	(England) TOT	(England) ASV	(South Africa) STB	(England) EVT	(England) CRP	(India) PUN	(India) MUT	(India) EAB
1	A	(England) Tottenham	6	2	3	0	0	1	7	1	+6	9	Advance to final	—	—	—	—	—	3–0 (6-5 P)	4–0 (3-2 P)	—
2	A	(England) Aston Villa (H)	6	2	3	0	0	1	7	3	+4	9	Advance to third-place playoff	—	—	0–1 (4-3 P)	—	—	—	—	4–0 (4-2 P)
3	B	(South Africa) Stellenbosch	6	3	0	0	3	0	3	0	+3	9	Advance to final	1–0 (4-5 P)	—	—	—	—	—	—	—
4	A	(England) Everton	6	2	2	0	1	1	8	2	+6	8	Advance to fifth-place playoff	—	—	—	—	—	1–2 (3-4 P)	1–0 (4-2 P)	—
5	A	(England) Crystal Palace	6	2	2	0	1	1	4	1	+3	8	Advance to seventh-place playoff	—	—	0–1 (5-4 P)	—	—	—	—	1–0 (4-2 P)
6	B	(India) Punjab	6	1	1	0	2	2	4	7	−3	4	Advance to third-place playoff	—	2–3 (5-3 P)	—	—	—	—	—	—
7	B	(India) Muthoot	6	0	1	0	2	3	0	8	−8	1	Advance to fifth-place playoff	—	—	—	—	0–3 (5-4 P)	—	—	—
8	B	(India) East Bengal	6	0	0	0	3	3	0	11	−11	0	Advance to seventh-place playoff	—	—	—	0–6 (1-4 P)	—	—	—	—

(H) Host

==== Placement matches ====
All matches played at main and secondary pitches of Bodymoor Heath Training Ground, Tamworth, Staffordshire, London, England with the final to take place at Loughborough University Stadium, Loughborough, Leicestershire, England.

7th place play-off
Team 1	Score	Team 2
(England) Crystal Palace	7-1	(India) East Bengal

5th place play-off
Team 1	Score	Team 2
(England) Everton	6-1	(India) Muthoot

3rd place play-off
Team 1	Score	Team 2
(England) Aston Villa	0-2	(India) Punjab

Sources: RFDL, PL

== AFC club competitions (men's) ==
=== AFC Champions League 2 ===
==== Qualifying play-offs ====
14 August 2024 Preliminary round	East Bengal (India)	2–3	(Turkmenistan) Altyn Asyr	Kolkata
19:00 UTC+5:30	Lalhlansanga 7'; Crespo 59'	Report	Annayew 18'; Nurmuradow 28'; Titow 52'	Stadium: Salt Lake Stadium; Referee: (Australia) Alexander King

==== Group stage ====
Pos	Team	Pld	W	D	L	GF	GA	GD	Pts	Qualification	TRA	WAK	RAV	MBSG
1	(Iran) Tractor	4	3	1	0	16	4	+12	10	Advance to round of 16	—	3–3	7–0	~~2 Oct~~
2	(Qatar) Al-Wakrah	4	1	1	2	4	8	−4	4	Advance to round of 16	0–3	—	0–2	~~6 Nov~~
3	(Tajikistan) Ravshan Kulob	4	1	0	3	3	11	−8	3		1–3	0–1	—	~~27 Nov~~
4	(India) Mohun Bagan SG	0	0	0	0	0	0	0	0	Withdrew, record expunged (Note: On 7 October 2024, AFC announced that Mohun Bagan SG were considered to have withdrawn from the AFC Champions League Two after they failed to appear for their fixture against Tractor in Tabriz due to safety concerns. Their single match was expunged.)	~~4 Dec~~	~~23 Oct~~	~~0–0~~	—

Source: AFC
Rules for classification: Tiebreakers
Notes:

18 September 2024	Mohun Bagan SG (India)	Voided (0–0)	(Tajikistan) Ravshan Kulob	Vivekananda Yuba Bharati Krirangan Stadium, Kolkata
19:30 UTC+5:30		Report		Attendance: 18,908; Referee: Ahmed Issa (United Arab Emirates)

2 October 2024	Tractor (Iran)	Cancelled	(India) Mohun Bagan SG	Yadegar-e Emam Stadium, Tabriz
19:30 UTC+3:30		The match on 2 October 2024 was cancelled by Asian Football Confederation as Mohan Bagan SG refused to travel to Tabriz, Iran citing security reasons followed by the current advisory by the Embassy of The Republic of India in Tehran, Iran due to the process of state mourning for Hezbollah leader Hassan Nasrallah. Consequently on 7 October, AFC announced that Mohun Bagan SG were considered to have withdrawn from the AFC Champions League Two.

23 October 2024	Mohun Bagan SG (India)	Cancelled	(Qatar) Al-Wakrah	Vivekananda Yuba Bharati Krirangan Stadium, Kolkata
19:30 UTC+5:30

6 November 2024	Al-Wakrah (Qatar)	Cancelled	(India) Mohun Bagan SG	Al Janoub Stadium, Al Wakrah
19:00 UTC+3

27 November 2024	Ravshan Kulob (Tajikistan)	Cancelled	(India) Mohun Bagan SG	Central Republican Stadium, Dushanbe (Note: Ravshan Kulob played their home matches at Central Republican Stadium, Dushanbe, instead of their regular home stadium Kulob Markazii Stadium, Kulob, which did not meet AFC requirements.)
19:00 UTC+5

4 December 2024	Mohun Bagan SG (India)	Cancelled	(Iran) Tractor	Vivekananda Yuba Bharati Krirangan Stadium, Kolkata
21:30 UTC+5:30

=== AFC Challenge League ===
==== Group stage ====
Pos	Team	Pld	W	D	L	GF	GA	GD	Pts	Qualification	EAB	NJM	PAR	BSK
1	(India) East Bengal	3	2	1	0	9	4	+5	7	Advance to Quarter-finals		3–2	2–2	
2	(Lebanon) Nejmeh	3	2	0	1	5	4	+1	6					1–0
3	(Bhutan) Paro (H)	3	1	1	1	5	5	0	4			1–2		
4	(Bangladesh) Bashundhara Kings	3	0	0	3	1	7	−6	0		0–4		1–2	

Source: AFC
Rules for classification: Group stage tiebreakers
(H) Hosts

26 October 2024	East Bengal (India)	2–2	(Bhutan) Paro	Changlimithang Stadium, Thimphu
17:00 UTC+6	Talal 5'; Diamantakos 69'	Report	Opoku 8' (pen.); Asante 45+4'	Referee: Mohammad Ghabayen (Jordan)

29 October 2024	Bashundhara Kings (Bangladesh)	0–4	(India) East Bengal	Changlimithang Stadium, Thimphu
21:00 UTC+6		Report	Diamantakos 1'; Souvik 20'; Nandhakumar 26'; Anwar 33'	Attendance: 200; Referee: Mohammad Deham (Bahrain)

1 November 2024	East Bengal (India)	3–2	(Lebanon) Nejmeh	Changlimithang Stadium, Thimphu
16:00 UTC+6	Musah 8' (o.g.); Diamantakos 15', 77' (pen.)	Report	Opare 18'; Monzer 43'	Referee: Songkran Bunmeekiart (Thailand)

==== Knockout stage ====
Quarter-finals
E2	(Cambodia) Svay Rieng	6	1	7
D1	(Myanmar) Shan United	2	2	4
East Region
D2	(Chinese Taipei) Tainan City	0	0	0
E1	(Indonesia) Madura United	0	3	3
B2	(Kuwait) Al-Arabi (a.e.t.)	1	2	3
C1	(Oman) Al-Seeb	0	2	2
West Region
A1	(India) East Bengal	0	1	1
B1	(Turkmenistan) Arkadag	1	2	3

Semi-finals
(Cambodia) Svay Rieng	3	3	6
(Indonesia) Madura United	0	3	3
(Kuwait) Al-Arabi	2	0	2
(Turkmenistan) Arkadag	0	3	3

Final
(Cambodia) Svay Rieng	1
(Turkmenistan) Arkadag (a.e.t.)	2

5 March 2025	East Bengal (India)	0–1	(Turkmenistan) Arkadag	Kolkata
19:00 UTC+5:30		Report	Gurbanow 10'	Stadium: Salt Lake Stadium; Attendance: 25,497

12 March 2025	Arkadag (Turkmenistan)	2–1 (1-3 agg.)	(India) East Bengal	Arkadag
15:30 UTC+5	Annadurdyýew 89' (pen.), 90+8'	Report	Bouli 1'	Stadium: Arkadag Stadium; Attendance: 10,000; Referee: Sheikh Ahmad Alaeddin (Lebanon)

== AFC club competitions (women's) ==
=== Preliminary Group B ===
Pos	Team	Pld	W	D	L	GF	GA	GD	Pts	Qualification
1	(India) Odisha	2	2	0	0	6	2	+4	6	Advance to group stage
2	(Jordan) Etihad (H)	2	1	0	1	6	2	+4	3	
3	(Singapore) Lion City Sailors	2	0	0	2	1	9	−8	0	

Source: AFC
Rules for classification: Tiebreakers
(H) Hosts

25 August 2024	Lion City Sailors (Singapore)	1–4	(India) Odisha	Prince Mohammed Stadium, Zarqa
19:00 UTC+3	R. Ee 43'	Report	D. Chu 20' (o.g.); Kom 54', 57'; Ruzi 88' (o.g.)	Attendance: 50; Referee: Park Se-jin (South Korea)

31 August 2024	Odisha (India)	2–1	(Jordan) Etihad	Prince Mohammed Stadium, Zarqa
19:00 UTC+3	Yeboah 27', 70'	Report	Jbarah 57'	Attendance: 200; Referee: Rebecca Durcau (Australia)

=== Main Group C ===
Pos	Team	Pld	W	D	L	GF	GA	GD	Pts	Qualification
1	(Japan) Urawa Red Diamonds	3	3	0	0	21	0	+21	9	Advance to Quarter-finals
2	(Vietnam) Hồ Chí Minh City (H)	3	2	0	1	6	4	+2	6	Advance to Quarter-finals
3	(Chinese Taipei) Taichung Blue Whale	3	1	0	2	5	5	0	3	Advance to Quarter-finals
4	(India) Odisha	3	0	0	3	1	24	−23	0	

Source: AFC
Rules for classification: Tiebreakers
(H) Hosts

6 October 2024	Urawa Red Diamonds (Japan)	17–0	(India) Odisha	Thống Nhất Stadium, Ho Chi Minh City
15:00 UTC+7	Endo 5'; Fujisaki 9'; Takatsuka 13'; Shiokoshi 15', 18', 30'; Shimada 17', 44'; Tanno 53'; Kurishima 54'; Ito 56', 59', 62', 90+4'; Ibrahim 66' (o.g.); Tsunoda 68'; Takeuchi 83'	Report		Attendance: 186; Referee: Pansa Chaisanit (Thailand)

9 October 2024	Odisha (India)	1–3	(Vietnam) Hồ Chí Minh City	Thống Nhất Stadium, Ho Chi Minh City
19:00 UTC+7	Yeboah 63'	Report	Nguyễn Thi Kim Yến 1'; Huỳnh Như 42'; Ngô Thị Hồng Nhung 90+4'	Attendance: 682; Referee: Yu Hong (China)

12 October 2024	Taichung Blue Whale (Chinese Taipei)	4–0	(India) Odisha	Thống Nhất Stadium, Ho Chi Minh City
15:00 UTC+7	Chen Jin-wen 42', 69'; Tanaka 45'; Silawan 57'	Report		Attendance: 135; Referee: Edita Mirabidova (Uzbekistan)

== Men's club football ==
=== Indian Super League ===
Pos	Team	Pld	W	D	L	GF	GA	GD	Pts	Qualification
1	Mohun Bagan (C, W)	24	17	5	2	47	16	+31	56	Qualification for the Champions League Two group stage and semi-finals
2	Goa	24	14	6	4	43	27	+16	48	Qualification for the Champions League Two preliminary stage and semi-finals (Note: Goa qualified for the AFC Champions League Two preliminary stage by winning the 2025 Super Cup.)
3	Bengaluru	24	11	5	8	40	31	+9	38 (Note: Head-to-head points: Bengaluru 7, NorthEast 7, Jamshedpur 3; Head-to-head goal difference: Bengaluru +2, NorthEast -2.)	Qualification for the knockouts
4	NorthEast United	24	10	8	6	46	29	+17	38	Qualification for the knockouts
5	Jamshedpur	24	12	2	10	37	43	−6	38	Qualification for the knockouts
6	Mumbai City	24	9	9	6	29	28	+1	36	Qualification for the knockouts
7	Odisha	24	8	9	7	44	37	+7	33	
8	Kerala Blasters	24	8	5	11	33	37	−4	29	
9	East Bengal	24	8	4	12	27	33	−6	28 (Note: Head-to-head points: East Bengal 6, Punjab 0.)	
10	Punjab	24	8	4	12	34	38	−4	28	
11	Chennaiyin	24	7	6	11	34	39	−5	27	
12	Hyderabad	24	4	6	14	22	47	−25	18	
13	Mohammedan	24	2	7	15	12	43	−31	13	

Source: ISL
Rules for classification: 1) points; 2) goal difference; 3) number of goals scored; 4) head-to-head points; 5) head-to-head goal difference; 6) head-to-head goals scored; 7) fair play ranking; 8) drawing of lots
(Note: Head-to-head record is used only after all the matches between the teams in question have been played).
(C) Champions; (W) ISL Cup winners

==== ISL playoffs ====
Knockout
4	NorthEast United	0
5	Jamshedpur	2
3	Bengaluru	5
6	Mumbai City	0

Semifinals
1	Mohun Bagan	1	2	3
5	Jamshedpur	2	0	2
2	Goa	0	2	2
3	Bengaluru	2	1	3

Finals
1	Mohun Bagan (a.e.t.)	2
3	Bengaluru	1

==== Final ====
12 April 2025
19:30 IST

Mohun Bagan	2–1 (a.e.t.)	Bengaluru
Cummings 72' (pen.); Maclaren 96'	ISL; AIFF; I-League	Alberto 49' (o.g.)

Vivekananda Yuba Bharati Krirangan, Kolkata
Attendance: 59,112
Referee: Senthil Nathan Sekaran

=== I-League ===
Pos	Team	Pld	W	D	L	GF	GA	GD	Pts	Promotion or relegation
1	Inter Kashi (C, P)	22	12	6	4	42	31	+11	42 (Note: Inter Kashi was awarded and then stripped of points in multiple rulings. The Court of Arbitration for Sport ultimately ruled in their favor, restoring four deducted points.)	Promotion to ISL and qualification for Super Cup (April) and (October)
2	Churchill Brothers	22	11	7	4	45	25	+20	40 (Note: Churchill Brothers were deducted one point and awarded two, which were later revoked by the Court of Arbitration for Sport. Churchill Brothers challenged this decision in Federal Supreme Court of Switzerland, which was dismissed, preventing further changes in points table.)	
3	Real Kashmir	22	10	7	5	31	25	+6	37 (Note: The forfeit win originally awarded to Real Kashmir was revoked by CAS in favor of Inter Kashi.)	
4	Gokulam Kerala	22	11	4	7	45	29	+16	37 (Note: Head-to-head: Real Kashmir 4, Gokulam Kerala 1)	Qualification for Super Cup (April) and (October)
5	Rajasthan United	22	9	6	7	34	33	+1	33	Qualification for Super Cup (October)
6	Dempo	22	8	5	9	35	33	+2	29 (Note: Head-to-head: Dempo 4, Namdhari 1)	Qualification for Super Cup (October)
7	Namdhari	22	8	5	9	28	30	−2	29 (Note: Namdhari was deducted three points for fielding an ineligible player, then awarded three in another ruling, which was also later overturned.)	
8	Shillong Lajong	22	7	7	8	46	45	+1	28	
9	Sreenidi Deccan	22	7	7	8	34	37	−3	28	
10	Aizawl	22	6	5	11	35	46	−11	23 (Note: Aizawl was awarded two points after Churchill Brothers fielded an ineligible player.)	
11	Sporting Bengaluru (R)	22	5	6	11	24	42	−18	21	Relegation to I-League 2
12	Delhi (R)	22	3	5	14	21	44	−23	14	Relegation to I-League 2

Source: I-League
Rules for classification: 1) Points; 2) Head-to-head points; 3) Head-to-head goal difference; 4) Total goal difference; 5) Total goals scored; 6) Drawing of lots
(Note: Head-to-head applies only after all relevant matches are played)
(C) Champions; (P) Promoted; (R) Relegated

=== I-League 2 ===
Pos	Team	Pld	W	D	L	GF	GA	GD	Pts	Promotion or relegation
1	Diamond Harbour (C)	16	11	5	0	28	10	+18	38	Promotion to I-League
2	Chanmari	16	10	3	3	36	10	+26	33	Promotion to I-League
3	Sporting Goa	16	7	5	4	18	12	+6	26	
4	Bengaluru United	16	6	5	5	21	11	+10	23	
5	SAT	16	6	4	6	21	23	−2	22	
6	United	16	5	6	5	15	17	−2	21	
7	NEROCA	16	5	2	9	19	29	−10	17	
8	TRAU	16	3	3	10	14	30	−16	12	Relegation to I-League 3
9	KLASA	16	2	1	13	8	38	−30	7	Relegation to I-League 3

Source: I-League 2 AIFF
Rules for classification: 1) points; 2) head-to-head points; 3) head-to-head goal difference; 4) head-to-head goals scored; 5) goal difference; 6) number of goals scored; 7) fair play ranking; 8) drawing of lots
(C) Champions

=== I-League 3 ===
Pos	Team	Pld	W	D	L	GF	GA	GD	Pts	Promotion	DHB	KLA	KAM	SES	DTH
1	Diamond Harbour (H)	4	4	0	0	10	2	+8	12	24/25 I-League 2 and Final		2–0	4–1		
2	KLASA	4	2	1	1	4	4	0	7	24/25 I-League 2			2–1	0–0	2–1
3	Karbi Anglong Morning Star	4	2	0	2	11	8	+3	6	25/26 I-League 2					6–0
4	Sesa	4	1	1	2	5	7	−2	4	Relegated to State leagues	0–3		2–3		
5	Downtown Heroes	4	0	0	4	3	12	−9	0	Relegated to State leagues	1–2			1–3	

(H) Hosts

Pos	Team	Pld	W	D	L	GF	GA	GD	Pts	Promotion	CFC	SAT	MYJ	ABU	DAL
1	Chanmari	4	4	0	0	10	1	+9	12	24/25 I-League 2 and Final				2–1	3–0
2	SAT	4	2	1	1	8	6	+2	7	24/25 I-League 2	0–3		3–1		3–0
3	MYJ–GMSC	4	2	0	2	4	5	−1	6	25/26 I-League 2	0–2			1–0	
4	Abbas Union	4	0	2	2	4	6	−2	2	Relegated to State leagues		2–2			1–1
5	Dalbir	4	0	1	3	1	9	−8	1	Relegated to State leagues			0–2		

==== Final ====
6 October 2024
15:00 IST

Diamond Harbour	1–0	Chanmari
Ragav Gupta 30'	Report

Naihati Stadium, Naihati
Attendance: 500
Referee: Ashwin

=== State football leagues ===
Zone	State	League	Teams	League dates	Duration (months)	Champions	Runners-up	I-League 3 qualification
North	Delhi	2024–25 Delhi Premier League	12	26 Sep 2024–24 Mar 2025	6	CISF Protectors	Garhwal Heroes	Royal Rangers
North	Punjab	2024–25 Punjab State Super League	12	25 July 2024–1 Apr 2025	9	Namdhari	Punjab	-
North	Rajasthan	2024–25 R-League A Division	11	7 Apr 2025–31 May 2025	2	Zinc FA	Royal FC Jaipur	Zinc FA
Northeast
Northeast	Assam	Assam State Premier League	11	2 Apr–10 June 2025	2	Chhaygaon	Elevenstar	Chhaygaon
Northeast	Manipur	Manipur State League	19	1 Feb 2025–8 Apr 2025	2	YPHU	Sang-Gai Heroes	-
Northeast	Manipur	Manipur Premier League	18	27 Apr 2025–27 July 2025	3	FC Raengdai	Asufii FA	FC Raengdai
Northeast	Mizoram	2024–25 Mizoram Premier League	8	9 July–15 Oct 2024	3	Aizawl	Mizoram Police	-
Northeast	Sikkim	SFA A Division S-League	8	5 Sep 2024–13 Feb 2025	5	Sikkim Police	Sikkim Brotherhood	Sikkim Brotherhood
Northeast	Sikkim	Sikkim Premier League	9	10 Apr–16 May 2025	1	Sikkim Aakraman	Singling SC	-
Northeast	Nagaland	2025 Nagaland Super League	7	28 Jan 2025–1 Apr 2025	2	Barak	Longterok	-
Northeast	Meghalaya	2024 Meghalaya State League	24	26 Oct 2024–1 Feb 2025	3	Mawlai	Shillong Lajong	Mawlai
East
East	Odisha	2024 FAO League	8	28 July–18 Sep 2024	2	Sunrise Club	Rovers Club	Sunrise Club; Samaleswari
East	West Bengal (Kolkata)	2024–25 Calcutta Premier Division	26	25 June 2024–18 Feb 2025	7	East Bengal	Diamond Harbour	-
East	Chhattisgarh	2025 Chhattisgarh Football League	8	17 Jan–30 Mar 2025	2.5	SECR Bilaspur	New Friends Dantewada	New Friends Dantewada
West	Goa	2024–25 Goa Professional League	14	21 Sep 2024–2 May 2025	7	Sporting Goa	Dempo	CD Salgaocar
West	Gujarat	Gujarat SFA Club Championship	10	19 Oct 2024–20 Mar 2025	5	ARA	Charutar Vidya Mandal	ARA
West	Madhya Pradesh	Madhya Pradesh Premier League	9	26 Oct 2024–14 Jan 2025	3	Lakecity FC	BLG The Diamond Rock	BLG The Diamond Rock
West	Maharashtra	2024–25 Maharashtra State Senior Men's Football League	8	10 May–14 June 2025	1	MMS Solapur	MYJ-GMSC	Mumbay
West	Mumbai	2024–25 Mumbai Premier League	18	13 Oct 2024–13 Apr 2025	6	India On Track	MYJ-GMSC	-
South	Karnataka (Bengaluru)	2024–25 Bangalore Super Division	18	7 Oct 2024–20 Feb 2025	5	FC Agniputhra	Kickstart	FC Agniputhra
South	Andhra Pradesh	2025 AP Super Cup	8	20–27 Mar 2025	8 days	Godavari FC	Kolleru FC	Citadel Godavari Legends
South	Kerala	2024–25 Kerala Premier League	14	27 Jan–12 May 2025	3.5	Muthoot FA	Kerala Police	-

== Cup competitions (Men's) ==
=== Durand Cup ===
Quarter-finals
21 August – Kokrajhar
NorthEast United	2
Indian Army	0
21 August – Shillong
Shillong Lajong	2
East Bengal	1
23 August – Jamshedpur
Mohun Bagan	3(6)
Punjab	3(5)
23 August – Kolkata
Bengaluru	1
Kerala Blasters	0

Semi-finals
26 August – Shillong
NorthEast United	3
Shillong Lajong	0
27 August – Kolkata
Mohun Bagan	2(4)
Bengaluru	2(3)

Final
31 August – Kolkata
NorthEast United	2(4)
Mohun Bagan	2(3)

==== Final ====
31 August 2024
17:30

Mohun Bagan SG	2–2	NorthEast United
Cummings 11' (pen.); Sahal 45+5'	Report	Ajaraie 55'; Guillermo 58'
Penalties
Cummings (penalty scored); Manvir (penalty scored); Colaco (penalty missed); Petratos (penalty scored); Subhasish (penalty missed)	3–4	Guillermo (penalty scored); Zabaco (penalty scored); Parthib (penalty scored); Ajaraie (penalty scored)

Salt Lake Stadium, Kolkata
Attendance: 52,391
Referee: Harish Kundu

=== Super Cup ===
Round of 16
20 April
8	Kerala Blasters	2
9	East Bengal	0
21 April
2	Goa	3
IL4	Gokulam Kerala	0
21 April
7	Odisha	0
10	Punjab	3
23 April
3	Bengaluru	1 (3)
IL2	Inter Kashi (p)	1 (5)
23 April
6	Mumbai City	4
11	Chennaiyin	0
24 April
4	Northeast United	6
13	Mohammedan	0
24 April
5	Jamshedpur	2
12	Hyderabad	0

Quarter-finals
26 April
8	Kerala Blasters	1
1	Mohun Bagan	2
26 April
2	Goa	2
10	Punjab	1
27 April
IL2	Inter Kashi	0
6	Mumbai City	1
27 April
4	Northeast United	0 (4)
5	Jamshedpur (p)	0 (5)

Semi-finals
30 April
1	Mohun Bagan	1
2	Goa	3
30 April
6	Mumbai City	0
5	Jamshedpur	1

Final
3 May
2	Goa	3
5	Jamshedpur	0

==== Final ====
Number of teams per tier still in competition
ISL	I-League	Total
2 / 13	0 / 12	2 / 25

3 May 2025
19:30 IST (UTC+5:30)
Match 14

Goa	3–0	Jamshedpur
Herrera 23', 51'; Dražić 72'	Report; PDF; Khel Now

Kalinga Stadium, Bhubaneswar
Attendance: 7,156
Referee: Venkatesh Ramachadran
Man of the Match: Borja Herrera (Goa)

=== Bandodkar Trophy ===
==== Group stage ====
Group A
Pos	Team	Pld	Pts
1	(India) Goa	3	9
2	(Australia) Brisbane Roar	3	6
3	(India) Dempo	3	3
4	(India) Sporting Goa	3	0

Source: gfagoa.com

Group B
Pos	Team	Pld	Pts
1	(India) Odisha	3	9
2	(Argentina) Defensa y Justicia	3	6
3	(India) Chennaiyin	3	3
4	(India) Churchill Brothers	3	0

Source: gfagoa.com

==== Knockout stage ====
Semifinals
A1	(India) Goa	1
B2	(Argentina) Defensa y Justicia	0
B1	(India) Odisha	'2
A2	(Australia) Brisbane Roar	1

Final
A1	(India) Goa (p)	3 (3)
B1	(India) Odisha	3 (1)

===== Final =====
6 September 2024
19:00 IST

Goa (India)	3–3	(India) Odisha
Sadiku 34' (pen.), 88'; Drazic 41'	Report	Boumous 18'; Jahouh 49' (pen.); Ali 55'
Penalties
Sadiku (penalty scored); Herrera (penalty scored); Drazic (penalty scored)	3–1	(penalty scored) Mauricio; (penalty missed) Jahouh; (penalty missed) Boumous; (penalty missed) Delgado

Fatorda Stadium, Margao
Referee: Tejas Nagvenkar

=== Sikkim Gold Cup ===
==== Matches ====
All international teams have been given a direct quarterfinal berth.

===== Bracket =====
Pre-Qualifying
(India) Sikkim Police	5
(India) Kalighat Milan Sangha	0
(India) Army Red	1
(India) Khawzawl Vengthar	5
(India) GTA XI	1
(India) Gangtok Himalayan	3
(India) Punjab Police	1
(India) Chennaiyin	3

Pre-Quarter
(India) Sikkim Police	3
(India) Gokulam Kerala	4
(India) Khawzawl Vengthar	1
(India) NorthEast United	3
(India) Gangtok Himalayan(p)	1 (4)
(India) Sudeva Delhi	1 (3)
(India) Chennaiyin	1
(India) Diamond Harbour	0

Quarterfinals
(India) Gokulam Kerala	2
(Bhutan) Transport United	1
(India) NorthEast United	6
(United Arab Emirates) Royal	1
(India) Gangtok Himalayan	3
(Malaysia) Kelantan Darul Naim	0
(India) Chennaiyin	1
(Nepal) Church Boys United	0

Semifinals
(India) Gokulam Kerala	0
(India) NorthEast United	2
(India) Gangtok Himalayan	2
(India) Chennaiyin	1

Final
(India) NorthEast United (p)	0 (4)
(India) Gangtok Himalayan	0 (3)

===== Final =====
24 November 2024
14:30

NorthEast United (India)	0–0	(India) Gangtok Himalayan
Penalties
	4–3

Paljor Stadium, Gangtok

== Women's club football ==
=== Indian Women's League ===
Pos	Team	Pld	W	D	L	GF	GA	GD	Pts	Qualification or relegation
1	East Bengal (C)	14	12	1	1	38	10	+28	37	Qualification for the Champions League preliminary stage and SAFF Club Championship
2	Gokulam Kerala	14	9	2	3	30	14	+16	29	
3	Sribhumi	14	7	1	6	27	23	+4	22	
4	Kickstart	14	4	6	4	20	20	0	18	
5	Sethu	14	5	2	7	18	23	−5	17	
6	Nita	14	4	2	8	19	33	−14	14	
7	Odisha (R)	14	3	3	8	16	25	−9	12	Relegation to Indian Women's League 2
8	HOPS (R)	14	2	3	9	10	30	−20	9	Relegation to Indian Women's League 2

Source: AIFF
Rules for classification: 1) points; 2) head-to-head points; 3) head-to-head goal difference; 4) goal difference; 5) number of goals scored; 6) drawing of lots
(C) Champions; (R) Relegated

=== Indian Women's League 2 ===
Pos	Team	Pld	W	D	L	GF	GA	GD	Pts	Promotion
1	Garhwal United	4	4	0	0	13	1	+12	12	Promotion to Indian Women's League
2	Indian Arrows (Note: Indian Arrows were initially not eligible for promotion during the course of the league, as they are an AIFF developmental team. AIFF confirmed their promotion on 11 July 2025. The decision was later rescinded on 23 November 2025.)	4	3	0	1	11	2	+9	9	
3	Sesa	4	1	0	3	5	12	−7	3	Promotion to Indian Women's League
4	Krida Prabodhini	4	1	0	3	4	11	−7	3	
5	Roots	4	1	0	3	2	9	−7	3	
6	Tungabhadra	0	0	0	0	0	0	0	0	Withdrew

Source: I-League
Rules for classification: 1) points; 2) head-to-head points; 3) head-to-head goal difference; 4) goal difference; 5) number of goals scored; 6) drawing of lots

== Men's club futsal ==
=== Futsal Club Championship ===
Knockout

Quarter-finals
14 August
Juggernaut	3
Corbett	5
14 August
Goal Hunterz	5
Ambelim	1
14 August
Bhawanipore	16
Minerva Academy	1
14 August
TOFA	7
Hazrat Nizamuddin	1

Semi-finals
16 August
Corbett	3
Goal Hunterz	5
16 August
Bhawanipore	7
TOFA	0

Final
18 August
Goal Hunterz	4
Bhawanipore	2

Final

18 August 2025
18:00 IST

Goal Hunterz	4–2	Bhawanipore
M. Adhikari 2', 36', 40'; Shoun 10'	Report	Khatua 28'; Laltlansanga 32'

Shri Manoj Sarkar Stadium, Rudrapur, Uttarakhand
Attendance: 200
Referee: Vishal Mahendrabhai Vaja

== Youth football ==
=== Elite League ===
Quarterfinals
A1	AIFF FIFA Talent Academy	5
B2	Mohun Bagan SG	0
C1	Northeast United	1
D2	Jamshedpur	2
B1	Bengal Football Academy	2
A2	Punjab FC	6
D1	Muthoot Football Academy	0
C2	FC Madras	5

Semifinals
QF1	AIFF FIFA Talent Academy	0
QF2	Jamshedpur	5
QF3	Punjab FC	3
QF4	FC Madras	2

Finals
SF1	Jamshedpur	1
SF2	Punjab FC	4

==== Final ====
14 May 2025
15:00 IST
Final

Jamshedpur	1–4	Punjab
Heerangamba Seram 84'	Report; Summary	Karish Soram 28'; Ashish Lohar 34'; Vikash Kisku 37'; Usham Thoungamba Singh 39'

Indira Gandhi Athletic Stadium, Guwahati, Assam, India
Referee: Bagavath Sundhar Jee S

=== Reliance Foundation Development League ===
All matches to be played at Reliance Corporate Park, Navi Mumbai.

Semifinals
A1	Jamshedpur	1
B2	Mohun Bagan SG	5
B1	Classic FA	3
A2	Goa	0

Final
SF1	Mohun Bagan SG	3
SF2	Classic FA	0
Third place
SF1	Jamshedpur	0
SF2	Goa	1

==== Final ====
14 April 2025
18:00 IST
Final

Mohun Bagan SG	3–0	Classic FA
Tamang 8', 23', 52'	Report

Reliance Corporate Park, Navi Mumbai, India
Attendance: 130

== Nationals ==
=== Santosh Trophy ===
Quarter-finals
26 December – Hyderabad (DA)
West Bengal	3
Odisha	1
27 December – Hyderabad (DA)
Meghalaya	1
Services	2
27 December – Hyderabad (DA)
Kerala	1
Jammu and Kashmir	0
26 December – Hyderabad (DA)
Manipur (a.e.t.)	5
Delhi	2

Semi-finals
29 December – Hyderabad (GBAS)
West Bengal	4
Services	2
29 December – Hyderabad (GBAS)
Kerala	5
Manipur	1

Final
31 December – Hyderabad (GBAS)
West Bengal	1
Kerala	0

==== Final ====
31 December 2024
19:30

West Bengal	1–0	Kerala
Robi 90+4'	Report

GMC Balayogi Athletic Stadium, Hyderabad
Attendance: 1,000
Referee: Akashkumar Kamleshkumar Mehta
Man of the Match: `Robi Hansda (West Bengal)

=== Rajmata Jijabai Trophy ===
Semi-finals
Manipur	3
West Bengal	0
Haryana	0
Odisha	2

Final
Manipur	1
Odisha	0

==== Final ====
23 December 2024
14:00 IST

Manipur	1–0	Odisha
Roja Devi 55'	Report

Ramakrishna Mission Sports Complex, Narayanpur
Attendance: 10,000
Referee: Ruba Devi G

== See also ==
- Football in India
