= 2024–25 in Bangladeshi football =

2024–25 Bangladeshi football season

Football in Bangladesh
- Season: 2024–25

Men's football
- BPL: Mohammedan SC
- BCL: PWD Sports Club
- 1st Division: Not Held
- 2nd Division: Not Held
- 3rd Division: Not Held
- Federation Cup: Bashundhara Kings
- Challenge Cup: Bashundhara Kings

Women's football
- BWFL: Not Held

The 2024–25 season is the 53rd competitive association football season in Bangladesh. The domestic season began on 1 June 2024, while the national team season commences on 12 June 2024 to TBC 2025.

== Men's national teams ==
=== Friendlies ===
5 September 2024 Friendly	Bhutan	0–1	Bangladesh	Thimphu, Bhutan
18:00 UTC+6		Report	Morsalin 5'	Stadium: Changlimithang Stadium; Referee: Prajwol Chhetri (Nepal)

8 September 2024 Friendly	Bhutan	1–0	Bangladesh	Thimphu, Bhutan
18:00 UTC+6	Wangchuk 90+1'	Report		Stadium: Changlimithang Stadium; Referee: Prajwol Chhetri (Nepal)

5 November 2024 Hybrid Friendly	Bangladesh	1–0	Fortis FC	Dhaka, Bangladesh
18:00 UTC+6	Piash 48'			Stadium: Bashundhara Kings Arena

8 November 2024 Hybrid Friendly	Bangladesh	3–2	Fortis FC	Dhaka, Bangladesh
18:00 UTC+6	Morsalin 17'; Piash 25'; Emon 67'			Stadium: Bashundhara Kings Arena

13 November 2024 Friendly	Bangladesh	0–1	Maldives	Dhaka, Bangladesh
BST (UTC+6)		Report	Fasir 18'	Stadium: Bashundhara Kings Arena; Referee: Virendha Rai (Bhutan)

16 November 2024 Friendly	Bangladesh	2–1	Maldives	Dhaka, Bangladesh
BST (UTC+6)	Jony 43'; Papon 90+4'	Report	Fasir 23'	Stadium: Bashundhara Kings Arena; Referee: Virendha Rai (Bhutan)

== Under-20 team ==
=== 2024 SAFF Under 20 Championship ===
Group A

Pos	Team	Pld	W	D	L	GF	GA	GD	Pts	Qualification
1	Nepal (H)	2	2	0	0	3	1	+2	6	Qualified for Knockout stage
2	Bangladesh	2	1	0	1	3	2	+1	3	Qualified for Knockout stage
3	Sri Lanka	2	0	0	2	0	3	−3	0	
4	Pakistan	0	0	0	0	0	0	0	0	Withdrew

Source: GSA
(H) Hosts

20 August 2024 2024 SAFF U-20 Championship GS	Bangladesh	2–1	Sri Lanka	Kathmandu, Nepal
15:15 BST (UTC+6)	Mirajul 17'; Nova 85'	Report		Stadium: Dasharath Rangasala Stadium; Referee: Senthil Nathan (India)

22 August 2024 2024 SAFF U-20 Championship GS	Bangladesh	1–2	Nepal	Kathmandu, Nepal
15:15 BST (UTC+6)	Mirajul 43'	Report	Samir Tamang 17'; Niranjan Shamim 19'	Stadium: Dasharath Rangasala Stadium; Attendance: 483; Referee: Afsheen Naseer

26 August 2024 2024 SAFF U-20 SF	India	1–1 (3–4 p)	Bangladesh	Lalitpur, Nepal
15:15 BST (UTC+6)	Rickey Meetei 75'	Report	Asadul Molla 36'	Stadium: ANFA Complex; Attendance: 3,243; Referee: Shyamlal Danuwar (Nepal)
	Penalties
	Thanglalsoun Gangte (penalty missed); Pramveer (penalty scored); Gwgwmsar Goyary (penalty scored); Manjot Singh Parmar (penalty scored); Akash Tirkey (penalty missed)		(penalty scored) Piash Ahmed Nova; (penalty scored) Moinul Islam Moin; (penalty scored) Shakil Ahad Topu; (penalty scored) Ashraful Haque Asif

28 August 2024 2024 SAFF U-20 Final	Nepal	1–4	Bangladesh	Lalitpur, Nepal
15:15 BST (UTC+6)	Samir Tamang 80'	Report	Mirajul 45+1', 55'; Rahul 71'; Nova 90+6'	Stadium: ANFA Complex; Attendance: 3,425; Referee: Mohamed Jafran Athambawa (Sri Lanka)

=== 2025 SAFF Under 20 Championship ===
Group A

Pos	Team	Pld	W	D	L	GF	GA	GD	Pts	Qualification
1	Bangladesh	2	1	1	0	5	2	+3	4	Advance to knockout stage
2	Maldives	2	0	2	0	4	4	0	2	Advance to knockout stage
3	Bhutan	2	0	1	1	2	5	−3	1	

Source: Soccerway

9 May 2025	Bangladesh	2–2	Maldives	Yupia, India
16:30 BST (UTC+6)	Faysal 13'; Kazi 45'	Report	Abdulla 57'; Zaki 73'	Stadium: Golden Jubilee Stadium; Attendance: 1,836; Referee: Md Jafran Athambawa (Sri Lanka)

11 May 2025	Bhutan	0–3	Bangladesh	Yupia, India
16:30 BST (UTC+6)		Report	Mursed 13'; Soran 28'; Faysal 90+6'	Stadium: Golden Jubilee Stadium; Referee: Nabindra Maharjan (Nepal)

16 May 2025 2025 SAFF U-19 SF	Bangladesh	2–1	Nepal	Yupia, India
16:00 BST (UTC+6)	Rahman 73'; Faysal 81'	Report	Dangol 87'	Stadium: Golden Jubilee Stadium; Attendance: 1,583; Referee: Ugyen Penjor (Bhutan)

18 May 2025 2025 SAFF U-19 Final	Bangladesh	1–1 (3–4 p)	India	Yupia, India
19:30 BST (UTC+6)	Joy 61'	SAFF	Shami 2'	Stadium: Golden Jubilee Stadium; Attendance: 12,789; Referee: Mohamed Jafran Athambawa (Sri Lanka)
	Penalties
	Mithu (penalty scored); Mursed (penalty scored); Joy (penalty scored); Faysal (penalty missed); Salah (penalty missed)		(penalty scored) Arbash; (penalty missed) Rohen Singh; (penalty scored) Rishi Singh; (penalty scored) Jodric; (penalty scored) Shami

=== 2025 AFC U-20 Asian Cup qualification ===
Group A

Pos	Team	Pld	W	D	L	GF	GA	GD	Pts	Qualification
1	Syria	4	4	0	0	16	1	+15	12	Final tournament
2	Vietnam (H)	4	3	0	1	12	2	+10	9	
3	Bangladesh	4	1	1	2	5	11	−6	4	
4	Guam	4	0	2	2	4	16	−12	2	
5	Bhutan	4	0	1	3	2	9	−7	1	

Source: AFC
(H) Hosts

21 September 2024 2025 AFC U-20 Asian Cup qualification GS	Bangladesh	0–4	Syria	Lạch Tray Stadium, Haiphong
20:45 BST (UTC+6)		Report	Kawa Issa 5'; Youshaa Knaj 12'; Wessam Dukhan 73'; Anas Dahhan 79'	Attendance: 198; Referee: Suhaizi Shukri (Malaysia)

23 September 2024 2025 AFC U-20 Asian Cup qualification GS	Guam	2–2	Bangladesh	Lạch Tray Stadium, Haiphong
17:00 BST (UTC+6)	Shuntaro Suzuki 75' (pen.); Curtis Harmon 90+1'	Report	Mirajul Islam 6'; Moinul Islam Moin 87'	Attendance: 325; Referee: Adam Kersey (Australia)

27 September 2024 2025 AFC U-20 Asian Cup qualification GS	Bangladesh	1–4	Vietnam	Lạch Tray Stadium, Haiphong
20:00 BST (UTC+6)	Nova 41'	Report	Hoàng Minh Tiến 3', 30'; Lê Văn Quang Duyệt 42'; Nguyễn Công Phương 81'	Attendance: 4,156; Referee: Suhaizi Shukri (Malaysia)

29 September 2024 2025 AFC U-20 Asian Cup qualification GS	Bhutan	1–2	Bangladesh	Lạch Tray Stadium, Haiphong
17:00 BST (UTC+6)	Asadul Islam Sakib 70' (o.g.)	Report	Asadul Molla 4'; Moin 87'	Attendance: 185; Referee: Tam Ping Wun (Hong Kong)

== Under-17 teams ==
=== SAFF U-17 Championship ===
Group A

Pos	Team	Pld	W	D	L	GF	GA	GD	Pts	Qualification
1	India	2	2	0	0	4	0	+4	6	Qualified for Knockout stage
2	Bangladesh	2	0	1	1	1	2	−1	1	Qualified for Knockout stage
3	Maldives	2	0	1	1	1	4	−3	1	

Source: GSA

20 September 2024 2024 SAFF U-17 Championship GS	Bangladesh	0–1	India	Thimphu, Bhutan
18:00 BST (UTC+6)		Report	Sumit Sharma Brahmacharimayum 90+1'	Stadium: Changlimithang Stadium Thimphu; Attendance: 300; Referee: Pema Tshewang (Bhutan)

22 September 2024 2024 SAFF U-17 Championship GS	Bangladesh	1–1	Maldives	Changlimithang Stadium, Thimphu
18:00 BST (UTC+6)	Murshed 49'	Report	Imran 79'	Attendance: 150; Referee: Nabindra Maharjan (Nepal)

28 September 2024 2024 SAFF U-17 Championship SF	Pakistan	2–2 (7–8 p)	Bangladesh	Changlimithang Stadium, Thimphu
18:00 BST (UTC+6)	M Shahab Ahmed 32'; Abdul Rehman 62' (pen.)	Report	Md Manik 74', 90+4'	Attendance: 40; Referee: Pema Tshewang (Bhutan)
	Penalties
	Abdul Rehman (penalty scored); Abdul Samad (penalty scored); Syed Muhammad Aabis Reza kazmi (penalty scored); Khobaib Khan (penalty scored); Ubaid Ullah Khan (penalty scored); Majid Ali (penalty scored); Sharaf Khan (penalty scored); Abdul Ghaani (penalty missed)		Murshed (penalty scored); Md Joy Ahmed (penalty scored); Md Kamal Merdha (penalty scored); Md Siam Omit (penalty scored); Md Manik (penalty scored); Akash Ahamad (penalty scored); Md Mithu Chowdhury (penalty scored); Ashikur Rahman (penalty scored)

30 September 2024 2024 SAFF U-17 Championship Final	India	2–0	Bangladesh	Changlimithang Stadium, Thimphu
18:00 BST (UTC+6)	Mohammed Kaif 58'; Mohammed Arbash 90+5'	Report		Attendance: 1230; Referee: Sashanka Madushanka (Sri Lanka)

=== Group B ===
Pos	Team	Pld	W	D	L	GF	GA	GD	Pts	Qualification
1	Afghanistan	4	4	0	0	23	3	+20	12	Final tournament
2	Bangladesh	4	2	0	2	10	4	+6	6	
3	Philippines	4	2	0	2	9	9	0	6	
4	Cambodia (H)	4	2	0	2	3	5	−2	6	
5	Macau	4	0	0	4	0	24	−24	0	

Source: AFC
Rules for classification: Qualification tiebreakers
(H) Hosts

19 October 2024 2025 AFC U-17 Asian Cup qual.	Cambodia	1–0	Bangladesh	Phnom Penh, Cambodia
18:00 BST (UTC+6)	Thach Daro 85'	Report		Stadium: Olympic Stadium; Referee: Ali Alachkar (Lebanon)

23 October 2024 2025 AFC U-17 Asian Cup qual.	Bangladesh	1–0	Philippines	Phnom Penh, Cambodia
18:00 BST (UTC+6)	Mohammad Shofiq Rahman 18'	Report		Stadium: Olympic Stadium; Referee: Tsoi Ramina (Kyrgyzstan)

25 October 2024 2025 AFC U-17 Asian Cup qual.	Bangladesh	7–0	Macau	Phnom Penh, Cambodia
17:00 BST (UTC+6)	Faysal 40', 74', 81', 83'; Md Manik 65'; Md Rifat Kazi 71'; Tang Tin 73' (o.g.)	Report		Stadium: Olympic Stadium; Referee: Ali Alachkar (Lebanon)

27 October 2024 2025 AFC U-17 Asian Cup qual.	Bangladesh	2–3	Afghanistan	Phnom Penh, Cambodia
17:00 BST (UTC+6)	Yaser Safi 30'; Milad Noori 62'; Arash Ahmadi 69'	Report	Mithu Chowdhury 6'; Murshed 45+1'	Stadium: Olympic Stadium; Referee: Ali Alachkar (Lebanon)

== Men's clubs football ==
=== League season ===
Bangladesh Premier League

League table

Pos	Team	Pld	W	D	L	GF	GA	GD	Pts	Qualification or relegation
1	Mohammedan (Note: Mohammedan does not possess an AFC Challenge League licence.) (C)	18	13	3	2	46	16	+30	42	
2	Dhaka Abahani	18	10	5	3	31	8	+23	35	Qualification for the AFC Challenge League qualifying stage
3	Bashundhara Kings (W)	18	9	5	4	45	15	+30	32	Qualification for the AFC Challenge League qualifying stage (Note: as Federation Cup winners.)
4	Rahmatganj	18	9	3	6	39	25	+14	30	
5	Brothers Union	18	7	6	5	28	18	+10	27	
6	Fortis	18	6	9	3	24	15	+9	27	
7	Bangladesh Police	18	8	3	7	23	24	−1	27	
8	Fakirerpool	18	6	1	11	23	54	−31	19	
9	Dhaka Wanderers (R)	18	3	1	14	14	55	−41	10	Relegation to BCL
10	Chittagong Abahani (R)	18	1	0	17	7	50	−43	3	Relegation to BCL

Source: Soccerway
Rules for classification: 1) Points; 2) Goal difference; 3) Goals scored.
(C) Champion; (R) Relegated; (W) Cup Winner
Notes:

Bangladesh Championship League

League table

Pos	Team	Pld	W	D	L	GF	GA	GD	Pts	BPL
1	PWD SC (C, P)	18	12	4	2	31	7	+24	40	Qualification to 2025–26 Bangladesh Premier League
2	Arambagh KS (P)	18	10	6	2	23	11	+12	36	Qualification to 2025–26 Bangladesh Premier League
3	City Club	18	8	7	3	28	14	+14	31	
4	Dhaka Rangers	18	6	5	7	22	28	−6	23	
5	Little Friends Club	18	5	6	7	18	20	−2	21	
6	Wari Club	18	5	6	7	16	24	−8	21	
7	BRTC SC	18	3	10	5	15	25	−10	19	
8	Farashganj SC (R)	18	4	5	9	14	21	−7	17	Relegation to 2025–26 Dhaka Senior Division League
9	Uttar Baridhara (R)	18	3	7	8	18	24	−6	16	Relegation to 2025–26 Dhaka Senior Division League
10	BFF Football Academy (Note: BFF Elite Academy is not eligible for promotion or relegation from the Bangladesh Championship League.)	18	3	6	9	16	27	−11	15	

Source: Global Sports Archive
Rules for classification: 1) Points; 2) Goal difference; 3) Goals scored;
(C) Champions; (P) Promoted; (R) Relegated

=== Cup competitions ===
Bangladesh Challenge Cup

Match

22 November 2024
17:00 BST (UTC+6)

Bashundhara Kings	3–1	Mohammedan SC
Topu 73'; Fahim 81'; Miguel 90+7'	Report	Diabate 7'

Bashundhara Kings Arena, Dhaka
Referee: Virendra Rai (Bhutan)

2024–25 Federation Cup

Groups stage
Group A

Pos	Team	Pld	W	D	L	GF	GA	GD	Pts	Qualification
1	Bashundhara Kings	4	3	0	1	9	4	+5	9	Qualified for QRF 1
2	Brothers Union	4	2	1	1	9	1	+8	7	Advanced to QRF 2
3	Fortis	4	2	1	1	5	1	+4	7	
4	Bangladesh Police	4	1	2	1	4	4	0	5	
5	Dhaka Wanderers	4	0	0	4	1	18	−17	0	

Source: Soccerway

Group B

Pos	Team	Pld	W	D	L	GF	GA	GD	Pts	Qualification
1	Dhaka Abahani	4	4	0	0	9	0	+9	12	Qualify for QRF 1
2	Rahmatganj MFS	4	3	0	1	10	2	+8	9	Advance to QRF 2
3	Mohammedan	4	2	0	2	11	4	+7	6	
4	Fakirerpool YMC	4	0	1	3	4	16	−12	1	
5	Chittagong Abahani	4	0	1	3	2	14	−12	1	

Source: Soccerway

Bracket

QRF 1
A1	Bashundhara Kings	1 (2)
B1	Dhaka Abahani (p)	1 (4)
QRF 2
A2	Brothers Union	1
B2	Rahmatganj MFS (a.e.t.)	2

QRF 3
A1	Bashundhara Kings (a.e.t.)	2
B2	Rahmatganj MFS	1

Final
B1	Dhaka Abahani	1 (3)
A1	Bashundhara Kings (p)	1 (5)

Final

22 & 29 April 2025 (Note: The final match was held on 22 April 2025, at 2:45 PM. But later, the match was temporarily suspended due to excessive rain and poor lighting at the end. The remainder of the match was later moved to 3:00 PM on 29 April 2025.)
15:00 BST
(Rescheduled) (Note: The original time of this match was 14:45 UTC on April 22.)

Dhaka Abahani	1–1 (Note: The match was temporarily suspended due to poor lighting.) (a.e.t.)	Bashundhara Kings
Ibrahim 15'	Report	Lescano 6'
Penalties
Augusto (penalty scored); Emeka (penalty missed); Sabuz (penalty scored); Mirajul (penalty scored)	3–5	(penalty scored) Fernandez; (penalty scored) Morsalin; (penalty scored) Md Insan Hossain; (penalty scored) Topu; (penalty scored) Daciel

Rafiq Uddin Bhuiyan Stadium, Mymensingh
Referee: Saymoon Hasan Sany
Man of the Match: Mehedi Hasan Srabon (Bashundhara Kings)

Dhaka Abahani	Bashundhara Kings

== Women's national teams ==
=== Group A ===
Pos	Team	Pld	W	D	L	GF	GA	GD	Pts	Qualification
1	India	2	1	0	1	6	5	+1	3	Qualified for Knockout stage
2	Bangladesh	2	1	1	0	4	2	+2	4	Qualified for Knockout stage
3	Pakistan	2	0	1	1	3	6	−3	1	

Source: Soccerway

20 October 2024 2024 SAFF Women's Championship GS	Bangladesh	1–1	Pakistan	Kathmandu, Nepal
17:45 BST (UTC+6)	Shamsunnahar Jr. 90+1'	Report	Malik 32'	Stadium: Dasharath Rangasala; Attendance: 307; Referee: Choki Om (Bhutan)

23 October 2024 2024 SAFF Women's Championship GS	India	1–3	Bangladesh	Kathmandu, Nepal
17:45 BST (UTC+6)	Bala Devi 43'	Report	Afeida Khandaker 19'; Tohura 29', 42'	Stadium: Dasharath Rangasala; Attendance: 251; Referee: Choki Om (Bhutan)

27 October 2024 2024 SAFF Women's Championship SF	Bangladesh	7–1	Bhutan	Kathmandu, Nepal
13:45 BST (UTC+6)	Ritu 7'; Tohura 15', 35', 58'; Sabina 26', 37'; Masura 72'	Report	Lhazom 41'	Stadium: Dasharath Rangasala; Attendance: 486; Referee: Y.A. Pabasara Minisaraniyapa (Sri Lanka)

30 October 2024 2024 SAFF W Final	Bangladesh	2–1	Nepal	Kathmandu, Nepal
17:45 BST (UTC+6)	Monika 52'; Ritu 81'	Report	Amisha Karki 56'	Stadium: Dasharath Rangasala; Attendance: 15,373; Referee: Kanika Barman (India)

=== Friendlies ===
26 February 2025 Friendly	United Arab Emirates	3–1	Bangladesh	Dubai, United Arab Emirates
21:30 BST (UTC+6)	Elizabeth Forshaw 18'; Georgia Gibson 28', 73'	Report	Afeida Khandaker 35' (pen.)	Stadium: United Arab Emirates Football Association Stadium; Referee: Alissar Baddour (Syria)

2 March 2025 Non-FIFA friendly	United Arab Emirates	3–1	Bangladesh	Dubai, United Arab Emirates
21:30 BST (UTC+6)	Nouf Faleh 32'; Mia Lindborg 40'; Georgia Gibson 58'	Report	Afeida Khandaker 80' (pen.)	Stadium: United Arab EmiratesourFootball Association Stadium; Referee: Alissar Baddour (Syria)

== AFC competitions ==
=== Groups stage ===
The detailed schedule was announced on 22 August 2024 after the draw ceremony.

=== Group A ===
Pos	Team	Pld	W	D	L	GF	GA	GD	Pts	Qualification	EAB	NJM	PAR	BSK
1	(India) East Bengal	3	2	1	0	9	4	+5	7	Advance to Quarter-finals		3–2	2–2	
2	(Lebanon) Nejmeh	3	2	0	1	5	4	+1	6					1–0
3	(Bhutan) Paro (H)	3	1	1	1	5	5	0	4			1–2		
4	(Bangladesh) Bashundhara Kings	3	0	0	3	1	7	−6	0		0–4		1–2	

Source: AFC
Rules for classification: Group stage tiebreakers
(H) Hosts

26 October 2024 2024–25 AFC Challenge League GS	Nejmeh (Lebanon)	1–0	(Bangladesh) Bashundhara Kings	Thimphu, Bhutan
21:00 BST (UTC+6)	Saad 49' (o.g.)	Report		Stadium: Changlimithang Stadium; Attendance: 300; Referee: Jin Jingyuan (China)

29 October 2024 2024–25 AFC Challenge League GS	Bashundhara Kings (Bangladesh)	0–4	(India) East Bengal	Thimphu, Bhutan
21:00 BST (UTC+6)	Diamantakos 1'; Souvik 20'; Nandhakumar 26'; Anwar 33'	Report		Stadium: Changlimithang Stadium; Attendance: 200; Referee: Mohammad Deham (Bahrain)

1 November 2024 2024–25 AFC Challenge League GS	Bashundhara Kings (Bangladesh)	1–2	(Bhutan) Paro	Thimphu, Bhutan
21:00 BST (UTC+6)	Gryshyn 12'	Report	Wangdi 23'; Jasur Jumayev 55' (o.g.)	Stadium: Changlimithang Stadium; Attendance: 869; Referee: Mohammad Mofeed Naser Ghabayen (Jordan)
