= Mahabub Hossain Roksy =

Bangladeshi footballer and coach (born 1975)

Roksy
Personal information
- Full name: Mahabub Hossain Roksy
- Date of birth: 10 October 1975 (age 51)
- Place of birth: Chittagong, Bangladesh
- Height: 1.70 m (5 ft 7 in)
- Position: Midfielder

Team information
- Current team: Bashundhara Kings (assistant)

Youth career
- 1985–86: MSPCC City Club

Senior career*
Years	Team	Apps	(Gls)
1987–88	Avijatrik Malibagh		
1988	Arambagh KS		
1989–95	Dhaka Mohammedan		
1991	Kolkata Mohammedan		
1995–98	Arambagh KS		
1999–00	Muktijoddha Sangsad		
2000	→ Chaturanga JS (loan)		
2001–02	Brothers Union		
2002–03	Farashganj SC		

International career
1990	Bangladesh U16		
1992	Bangladesh U19		
1991	Bangladesh U23		
1991	Bangladesh	0	(0)

Managerial career
- 2003–05: Badda Jagoroni
- 2006: Bangladesh U17
- 2017: Bangladesh U23 (assistant)
- 2017: Bangladesh U19
- 2017–18: Sheikh Jamal DC
- 2018: Bangladesh (assistant)
- 2018–: Bashundhara Kings (assistant)
Medal record
Representing Bangladesh
South Asian Games
Bronze medal – third place	1991
- * Club domestic league appearances and goals

Mahabub Hossain Roksy (Bengali: মাহাবুব হোসেন রক্সি; born 10 October 1975) is a Bangladeshi football coach and former player who currently serves as the assistant coach of Bangladesh Premier League club Bashundhara Kings.

== Coaching career ==
Roksy is now the head coach of Sheikh Jamal Dhanmondi Club in Bangladesh Premier League. He was also the assistant head coach for Andrew Ord in the Bangladesh national football team.

He was the head coach of Bangladesh side during 2017 SAFF U-18 Championship.

== Managerial statistics ==
As of February 2018

Team	Nat.	From	To	P	W	D	L	GS	GA	%W
Bangladesh U19	(Bangladesh)	September 2017	October 2017	8	5	1	2	14	6	62.50
Sheikh Jamal DC	(Bangladesh)	November 2017	February 2018	14	7	4	3	28	20	50.00

P – Total of played matches W – Won matches D – Drawn matches L – Lost matches GS – Goal scored GA – Goals against
%W – Percentage of matches won
