= 2022 SAFF U-17 Championship =

Tournament details
- Host country: Sri Lanka
- City: Colombo
- Dates: 5–14 September
- Teams: 6 (from 1 confederation)
- Venue: 1

Final positions
- Champions: India (4th title)
- Runners-up: Nepal

Tournament statistics
- Matches played: 7
- Goals scored: 29 (4.14 per match)
- Top scorer(s): (India) Thanglalsoun Gangte (Bangladesh) Mirajul Islam (Nepal) Unesh Budhathoki (4 goals each)

The 2022 SAFF U-17 Championship was the seventh edition of the SAFF U-17 Championship, an international football competition for men's under-17 national teams organized by South Asian Football Federation (SAFF). The tournament took place in Sri Lanka from September 5 to 14, 2022. Six teams from the region took part.

India is the defending champion. They have won previous season title by beating Nepal 7−0 on 31 August 2019.

== Participating teams ==
FIFA suspended Pakistan Football Federation on 7 April 2021, but eventually withdrew the ban, yet they could not participate in the competition as it was too late for them to be ready.

Team	Appearances in the SAFF U-17 Championship	Previous best performance
Bangladesh	7th	Champions (2015, 2018)
Bhutan	5th	Fourth Place
India	7th	Champions (2013, 2017, 2019)
Maldives	5th	Group Stage
Nepal	7th	Runners-up (2013, 2017, 2019)
Sri Lanka (Host)	6th	Group Stage

== Venue ==
All matches are being held at the Racecourse Ground in Colombo, Sri Lanka.

Colombo	Colombo is located in Sri Lanka
Racecourse Ground	Colombo is located in Sri Lanka
Capacity: 10,000	Colombo is located in Sri Lanka

== Officials ==
Referees

- (Maldives) Abdulla Shathir
- (Sri Lanka) Athambawa Mohammed Jafran
- (Bhutan) Pema Tshewang
- (Nepal) Kabin Byanjankar

Assistant Referees

- (Bangladesh) Sujoy Barua
- (Bangladesh) Md Alamgir Sarker
- (Sri Lanka) Liyanagunawardhana Dhanushka Sampath
- (Maldives) Niushad Mohamed
- (Nepal) Yunal Malla
- (Bhutan) Passang Tshering

== Draw ==
Once the hosting nation is announced, it will be put in the 1st position of pot 1 while Maldives will be moved to pot 3.

Pot 1	Pot 2	Pot 3
Sri Lanka (Hosts); India	Nepal; Bangladesh	Bhutan; Maldives
Source: SAFF

== Players' eligibility ==
Players born on or after 1 January 2006, are eligible to compete in the tournament. Each team has to register a squad of minimum 16 players and maximum 23 players, minimum two of whom must be goalkeepers.

== Group stage ==
- Times listed are UTC+05:30 Sri Lanka Standard Time.

Key to colours in group tables
Group winners and runners-up advance to the semi-finals

Tiebreakers

Teams are ranked according to points (3 points for a win, 1 point for a draw, 0 points for a loss), and if tied on points, the following tiebreaking criteria are applied, in the order given, to determine the rankings.

1. Points in head-to-head matches among tied teams;
2. Goal difference in head-to-head matches among tied teams;
3. Goals scored in head-to-head matches among tied teams;
4. If more than two teams are tied, and after applying all head-to-head criteria above, a subset of teams are still tied, all head-to-head criteria above are reapplied exclusively to this subset of teams;
5. Goal difference in all group matches;
6. Goals scored in all group matches;
7. Penalty shoot-out if only two teams are tied and they met in the last round of the group;
8. Disciplinary points (yellow card = 1 point, red card as a result of two yellow cards = 3 points, direct red card = 3 points, yellow card followed by direct red card = 4 points);
9. Drawing of lots.

=== Group A ===
Pos	Team	Pld	W	D	L	GF	GA	GD	Pts	Status
1	Bangladesh	2	2	0	0	10	1	+9	6	Qualified for Knockout stage
2	Sri Lanka (H)	2	1	0	1	2	5	−3	3	Qualified for Knockout stage
3	Maldives	2	0	0	2	0	6	−6	0	

Source: GSA
(H) Hosts

5 September 2022
20:00

Bangladesh	5–1	Sri Lanka
Rubel 7'; Murshed 10', 75'; Rana 79'; Nazim Uddin 90+2'	Report	Yasser 77'

Colombo Racecourse, Colombo
Attendance: 556
Referee: Kabin Byanjankar (Nepal)

7 September 2022
15:30

Maldives	0–5	Bangladesh
	Report	Faysal 5'; Murshed 38'; Mirajul 74', 77', 90+7'

Colombo Racecourse, Colombo
Attendance: 206
Referee: Pema Tshewang (Bhutan)

9 September 2022
20:00

Sri Lanka	1−0	Maldives
	Report

Colombo Racecourse, Colombo

=== Group B ===
Pos	Team	Pld	W	D	L	GF	GA	GD	Pts	Status
1	Nepal	2	2	0	0	5	2	+3	6	Qualified for Knockout stage
2	India	2	1	0	1	4	3	+1	3	Qualified for Knockout stage
3	Bhutan	2	0	0	2	1	5	−4	0	

Source: GSA

5 September 2022
15:30

Bhutan	0–3	India
	Report	Gangte 9', 15'; Vanlalpeka 47'

Colombo Racecourse, Colombo
Attendance: 302
Referee: Athambawa Mohammed Jafran (Sri Lanka)

7 September 2022
20:00

Nepal	2−1	Bhutan
Budathoki 13'; S. Thapa 57'	Report	J. Dorji 68'

Colombo Racecourse, Colombo
Attendance: 346
Referee: Abdulla Shathir (Maldives)

9 September 2022
15:30

India	1−3	Nepal
Danny 25'	Report	Saroj; Budathoki 49'; Subash 68'

Colombo Racecourse, Colombo

== Knockout stage ==
=== Bracket ===
Semi-finals
12 September – Colombo
Bangladesh	1
India	2
12 September – Colombo
Nepal	6
Sri Lanka	0

Final
14 September – Colombo
India	4
Nepal	0

=== Semi-finals ===
12 September 2022

Bangladesh	1–2	India
Mirajul 61' (pen.)	Report	Gangte 50', 58'

Colombo Racecourse, Colombo
Referee: Kabin Byanjankar (Nepal)
12 September 2022
20:00

Nepal	6–0	Sri Lanka
Laksham 22'; Budhathoki 23', 51'; Subash 30'; Karki 38'; Rai 90'	Report

Colombo Racecourse, Colombo

=== Final ===
14 September 2022
20:00

India	4–0	Nepal
Bobby 18'; Korou 30'; Guite 63'; Aman 90+4'	Report

Colombo Racecourse, Colombo
Referee: Alamgir Sarker (Bangladesh)

== Winner ==
7th SAFF U-17 Championship 2022

India
Fourth title

== Goalscorers ==
There have been 35 goals scored in 9 matches, for an average of 3.89 goals per match (as of 14 September 2022).

4 goals

- (Nepal) Unesh Budhathoki
- (India) Thanglalsoun Gangte
- (Bangladesh) Mirajul Islam

3 goals

- (Bangladesh) Murshed Ali

2 goals

- (India) Vanlalpeka Guite
- (Nepal) Subash Bam

1 goal

- (Bangladesh) Mohammed Rubel Shaikh
- (Bangladesh) Sirajul Islam Rana
- (Bangladesh) Mohammed Nazim Uddin
- (Bangladesh) Nazmul Huda Faysal
- (Bhutan) Jetsune Dorji
- (India) Danny Meitei
- (India) Bobby
- (India) Korou
- (Nepal) Harish Raj Bhatta
- (Nepal) Niraj Karki
- (Nepal) Sijal Rai
- (Nepal) Prashant Laksham
- (Nepal) Semanta Thapa
- (Nepal) Saroj Darlami
- (Sri Lanka) M. M. Yasser Sharfaraz
- (Sri Lanka) Mohamed Aiham Ibrahim

Source: SAFF

== See also ==
- 2022 SAFF Women's Championship
- 2022 SAFF U-18 Women's Championship
- 2022 SAFF U-15 Women's Championship
- 2022 SAFF U-20 Championship
