= Murshed Ali =

Bangladeshi footballer

Personal information
- Date of birth: December 20, 2008 (age 17)
- Place of birth: Bangladesh
- Height: 1.65 m (5 ft 5 in)
- Positions: Forward; right winger

Team information
- Current team: Fortis
- Number: 16

Youth career
- —2021: Boda Two Star FA
- BKSP
- 2021–2024: BFF Elite Academy

Senior career*
Years	Team	Apps	(Gls)
2024–	Fortis	16	(1)

International career^{‡}
2022–2024	Bangladesh U17	15	(6)
2025–	Bangladesh U20	8	(1)
2026–	Bangladesh Olympic	3	(0)
- * Club domestic league appearances and goals as of 17 October 2026 ‡ National team caps and goals as of 8 June 2026

Murshed Ali (Bengali: মুর্শেদ আলি, pronounced [murʃed̪ aliː]; born 20 December 2008) is a Bangladeshi professional footballer who plays as a right winger for Fortis.

== Early career ==
Murshed comes from Boda of Panchagarh District. His football journey developed through the Boda Two Star Football Academy under Mofazzal Hossain Bipul. He later got admitted to BKSP and afterwards earned a place at the BFF Elite Academy.

== Club career ==
In July 2024, Murshed joined Fortis from the BFF Elite Academy. He scored his first goal in the Bangladesh Football League for the club against Brothers Union on 15 May 2026.

== International career ==
Murshed made his junior international debut in the 2022 SAFF U-17 Championship, where he marked his first appearance with two goals. In the 2024 SAFF U-17 Championship, he scored once to help his side secure progression to the semi-finals, with Bangladesh ultimately finishing as tournament runners-up.

During the 2025 SAFF U-19 Championship, he found the net once again, playing a role in Bangladesh's run to the semi-finals. The following year, he was part of the Bangladesh U-20 squad that won the 2026 SAFF U-20 Championship.

He made his debut for Bangladesh U-23 against Pakistan.

His maiden call-up to the senior national team came in November 2025, although he did not feature in the starting eleven.

== Honors ==
Bangladesh U20

- SAFF U-20 Championship: 2026
