= 2024 SAFF U-17 Championship =

Tournament details
- Host country: Bhutan
- Dates: 20–30 September 2024
- Teams: 7 (from 1 sub-confederation)
- Venue: 1 (in 1 host city)

Final positions
- Champions: India (6th title)
- Runners-up: Bangladesh

Tournament statistics
- Matches played: 12
- Goals scored: 44 (3.67 per match)
- Attendance: 6,208 (517 per match)
- Top scorer(s): (Nepal) Sujan Dangol (4 goals)
- Best player: (India) Mohamed Arbash
- Best goalkeeper: (India) Aheibam Suraj Singh
- Fair play award: Bhutan

The 2024 SAFF U-17 Championship was the ninth edition of the SAFF U-17 Championship, an international football competition for men's under-17 national teams organized by South Asian Football Federation (SAFF). Its played from 20 to 30 September 2024 in Thimphu, Bhutan.

India are the defending champions, who won their sixth title by defeating Bangladesh 2–0 goals in the final on 30 September 2024.

== Venue ==
All matches played at the Changlimithang Stadium in Thimphu, Bhutan.

Thimphu
Changlimithang Stadium
Capacity: 15,000
Thimphu is located in Bhutan

== Participating teams ==
The following seven teams were participated in the tournament.

Team	Appearances in the SAFF U-17 Championship	Previous best performance
Bangladesh	9th	Champion (2015, 2018)
Bhutan (Host)	7th	Fourth place (2017)
India	9th	Champion (2013, 2017, 2019, 2022, 2023)
Maldives	7th	Group stage (2011, 2015, 2017, 2018, 2022)
Nepal	9th	Runners-up (2013, 2017, 2019, 2022)
Pakistan	5th	Champion (2011)
Sri Lanka	7th	Semi-finals (2022)

== Draw ==
The draw ceremony of the tournament was held in Hotel InterContinental, Dhaka, Bangladesh on 8 June 2024. The seven participants was divided into two groups which Group A consist three teams & followed by Group B four teams.

=== Draw ===
Pot 1	Pot 2	Pot 3	Pot 4
India; Bhutan (hosts)	Maldives; Nepal	Bangladesh; Pakistan	Sri Lanka

=== Draw result ===
Group A
Pos	Team
A1	India
A2	Maldives
A3	Bangladesh

Group B
Pos	Team
B1	Bhutan
B2	Nepal
B3	Pakistan
B4	Sri Lanka

== Match officials ==
Referees

- (Bangladesh) Md Symoon Hasan Sany
- (Bhutan) Pema Tshewang
- (India) Mrutyunjay L Amatya
- (Maldives) Zaheer Hussain
- (Nepal) Nabindra Maharjan
- (Sri Lanka) Sashanka Madushanka

Assistant referees

- (Bangladesh) Sujoy Barua
- (Bhutan) Tshering Phuntsho
- (India) Sourav Sarkar
- (Maldives) Abdulla Shathir
- (Nepal) Harish Karki
- (Sri Lanka) Indunil Sandakelum

== Players eligibility ==
Players born on or after 1 January 2008 are eligible to compete in the tournament. Each team has to register a squad of minimum 16 players and maximum 23 players, minimum two of whom must be goalkeepers.

== Group stage ==
- Times listed are UTC+06:00 Bhutan Time.

Key to colours in group tables
Group winners and runners-up advance to the semi-finals

Tiebreakers

Teams are ranked according to points (3 points for a win, 1 point for a draw, 0 points for a loss), and if tied on points, the following tiebreaking criteria are applied, in the order given, to determine the rankings.

1. Points in head-to-head matches among tied teams;
2. Goal difference in head-to-head matches among tied teams;
3. Goals scored in head-to-head matches among tied teams;
4. If more than two teams are tied, and after applying all head-to-head criteria above, a subset of teams are still tied, all head-to-head criteria above are reapplied exclusively to this subset of teams;
5. Goal difference in all group matches;
6. Goals scored in all group matches;
7. Penalty shoot-out if only two teams are tied and they met in the last round of the group;
8. Disciplinary points (yellow card = 1 point, red card as a result of two yellows, direct red card = 3 points, yellow card followed by direct red card = 4 points);
9. Drawing of lots.

=== Group A ===
Pos	Team	Pld	W	D	L	GF	GA	GD	Pts	Qualification
1	India	2	2	0	0	4	0	+4	6	Qualified for Knockout stage
2	Bangladesh	2	0	1	1	1	2	−1	1	Qualified for Knockout stage
3	Maldives	2	0	1	1	1	4	−3	1	

Source: GSA
20 September 2024
18:00

Bangladesh	0–1	India
	Report	Sumit Sharma Brahmacharimayum 90+1'

Changlimithang Stadium, Thimphu
Attendance: 300
Referee: Pema Tshewang (Bhutan)

22 September 2024
18:00

Bangladesh	1–1	Maldives
Murshed Ali 49'	Report	Mohamed Ilan Imran 79'

Changlimithang Stadium, Thimphu
Attendance: 150
Referee: Nabindra Maharjan (Nepal)

24 September 2024
18:00

India	3–0	Maldives
Samson Ahongshangban 13'; Hemneichung Lunkim 74', 89'	Report

Changlimithang Stadium, Thimphu
Attendance: 60
Referee: Sashanka Madushanka (Sri Lanka)

=== Group B ===
Pos	Team	Pld	W	D	L	GF	GA	GD	Pts	Qualification
1	Pakistan	3	2	1	0	9	4	+5	7	Qualified for Knockout stage
2	Nepal	3	2	0	1	6	2	+4	6	Qualified for Knockout stage
3	Bhutan (H)	3	1	1	1	9	6	+3	4	
4	Sri Lanka	3	0	0	3	2	14	−12	0	

Source: GSA
(H) Hosts
21 September 2024
14:00

Nepal	0–1	Pakistan
	Report	Muhammad Talha 81'

Changlimithang Stadium, Thimphu
Attendance: 60
Referee: Sashanka Madushanka (Sri Lanka)
21 September 2024
18:00

Bhutan	5–1	Sri Lanka
Karma Yeshe Thabkhe 14'; Sayon Lama 40'; Chimi Tobden Dorji 57'; Thinley Yezer 78'; Tandin Phuntsho 83'	Report	Mohamed Zaid Mohamed Ifham 65'

Changlimithang Stadium, Thimphu
Attendance: 1,199
Referee: Mrutyunjay L Amatya (India)

23 September 2024
14:00

Nepal	4–0	Sri Lanka
Sujan Dangol 4', 12', 30'; Bigyan Khadka 84'	Report

Changlimithang Stadium, Thimphu
Attendance: 30
Referee: Zaheer Hussain (Maldives)
23 September 2024
18:00

Bhutan	3–3	Pakistan
Thinley Yeszer 25'; Tandin Phuntsho 90+4'; Sonam Dorji 90+6' (pen.)	Report	Khobaib Khan 38'; Subhan Karim 47'; Sharaf Khan 68'

Changlimithang Stadium, Thimphu
Attendance: 1,200
Referee: Md Symoon Hasan Sany (Bangladesh)

25 September 2024
14:00

Pakistan	5–1	Sri Lanka
Subhan Karim 20', 26'; Muhammad Talha 30'; Mohamed Irshad 47' (o.g.); Abdul Ghani 56'	Report	Zakariyya Zafarullah 77'

Changlimithang Stadium, Thimphu
Attendance: 70
Referee: Zaheer Hussain (Maldives)
25 September 2024
18:00

Bhutan	1–2	Nepal
Yonten Tharchen 43'	Report	Krishna Bahadur Ale 56'; Sujan Dangol 85'

Changlimithang Stadium, Thimphu
Attendance: 1,787
Referee: Mrutyunjay L Amatya (India)

== Knockout stage ==
- In the knockout stages, if a match finished goalless at the end of normal playing time, extra time would have been played (two periods of 15 minutes each) and followed, if necessary, by a penalty shoot-out to determine the winner.

=== Bracket ===
Semi-finals
28 September – Thimphu
India	4
Nepal	2
28 September – Thimphu
Pakistan	2 (7)
Bangladesh (p)	2 (8)

Final
30 September – Thimphu
India	2
Bangladesh	0

=== Semi-finals ===
28 September 2024
14:00

India	4–2	Nepal
Vishal Yadav 61', 68'; Ningthou Khongjam Rishi Singh 85'; Hemneichung Lunkim 90+5'	Report	Subash Bam 82'; Mohammed Kaif 89' (o.g.)

Changlimithang Stadium, Thimphu
Attendance: 82
Referee: Md Symoon Hasan Sany (Bangladesh)
28 September 2024
18:00

Pakistan	2–2	Bangladesh
M Shahab Ahmed 32'; Abdul Rehman 62' (pen.)	Report	Md Manik 74', 90+4'
Penalties
Abdul Rehman (penalty scored); Abdul Samad (penalty scored); Syed Muhammad Aabis Reza kazmi (penalty scored); Khobaib Khan (penalty scored); Ubaid Ullah Khan (penalty scored); Majid Ali (penalty scored); Sharaf Khan (penalty scored); Abdul Ghaani (penalty missed)	7–8	(penalty scored) Murshed Ali; (penalty scored) Md Joy Ahmed; (penalty scored) Md Kamal Merdha; (penalty scored) Md Siam Omit; (penalty scored) Md Manik; (penalty scored) Akash Ahamad; (penalty scored) Md Mithu Chowdhury; (penalty scored) Ashikur Rahman

Changlimithang Stadium, Thimphu
Attendance: 40
Referee: Pema Tshewang (Bhutan)

=== Final ===
30 September 2024
18:00

India	2–0	Bangladesh
Mohammed Kaif 58'; Mohammed Arbash 90+5'	Report

Changlimithang Stadium, Thimphu
Attendance: 1,230
Referee: Sashanka Madushanka (Sri Lanka)

== Statistics ==
=== Goalscorers ===
There were 44 goals scored in 12 matches, for an average of 3.67 goals per match.

4 goals

- (Nepal) Sujan Dangol

3 goals

- (India) Hemneichung Lunkim
- (Pakistan) Subhan Karim

2 goals

- (Bangladesh) Md Manik
- (Bhutan) Thinley Yezer
- (Bhutan) Tandin Phuntsho
- (India) Vishal Yadav
- (Pakistan) Muhammad Talha

1 goal

- (Bhutan) Yonten Tharchen
- (Bhutan) Karma Yeshe Thabkhe
- (Bhutan) Sayon Lama
- (Bhutan) Chimi Tobden Dorji
- (Bhutan) Sonam Dorji
- (Bangladesh) Murshed Ali
- (India) Mohammed Kaif
- (India) Mohammed Arbash
- (India) Sumit Sharma Brahmacharimayum
- (India) Samson Ahongshangban
- (India) Ningthou Khongjam Rishi Singh
- (Maldives) Mohamed Ilan Imran
- (Nepal) Bigyan Khadka
- (Nepal) Krishna Bahadur Ale
- (Nepal) Subash Bam
- (Pakistan) Sharaf Khan
- (Pakistan) Abdul Ghani
- (Pakistan) Khobaib Khan
- (Pakistan) M. Shahab Ahmed
- (Pakistan) Abdul Rehman
- (Sri Lanka) Mohamed Zaid Mohamed Ifham
- (Sri Lanka) Zakariyya Zafarullah

1 own goal

- (India) Mohammed Kaif (Playing against Nepal)
- (Sri Lanka) Mohamed Irshad (Playing against Pakistan)

Source: GSA

== Winner ==
9th SAFF U-17 Championship 2024 Champions

India
Sixth title

== Awards ==
Fair Play Award	Best Goalkeeper	Highest Goalscorer	Most Valuable Player
Bhutan	(India) Aheibam Suraj Singh	(Nepal) Sujan Dangol	(India) Mohammed Arbash

== See also ==
- 2024 SAFF Women's Championship
- 2024 SAFF U-20 Championship
- 2024 SAFF U-16 Women's Championship
- 2024 SAFF U-19 Women's Championship
