= 2024 VFF Tri-Nations Series =

International football tournament

2024 VFF Tri Nation Series
Tournament details
- Host country: Vietnam
- City: Nam Định
- Dates: Cancelled (originally 9–15 October 2024)
- Teams: 3 (from 1 confederation)

The 2024 VFF Tri Nation Series, was to be the 13th edition of the VFF Cup, the international men's football tournament organized by the Vietnam Football Federation. It was scheduled be played from 9 October to 15 October 2024, featuring three teams, with all matches held at Thiên Trường Stadium in Nam Định.

The withdrawal of Lebanon one week before the tournament lead the Vietnam Football Federation to cancel the tournament.

== Participating nations ==
Host Vietnam originally invited Lebanon and India to participate in the tournament. However, on 3 October 2024, Lebanon announced their withdrawal from the tournament following the 2024 Israeli invasion of Lebanon. Due to lack of time, the Vietnam Football Federation was unable to invite a replacement team and decided to cancel the tournament. The match between Vietnam and India was maintained as a friendly game and was rescheduled to be held on 12 October 2024.

FIFA Rankings, as of 19 September 2024

| Nation | FIFA ranking |
|---|---|
| Vietnam (Hosts) | 116 |
| Lebanon | 114 |
| India | 126 |

== Matches ==
9 October 2024
18:00

| Vietnam | Cancelled | India |
|---|---|---|
| | Report |

Thiên Trường Stadium, Nam Định
12 October 2024
18:00

| Lebanon | Cancelled | India |
|---|---|---|
| | Report |

Thiên Trường Stadium, Nam Định
15 October 2024
18:00

| Vietnam | Cancelled | Lebanon |
|---|---|---|
| | Report |

Thiên Trường Stadium, Nam Định
