= Simran Gurung =

Indian footballer (born 2005)

Personal information
- Date of birth: 18 March 2005 (age 21)
- Place of birth: Jorethang, Namchi district, Sikkim, India
- Position: Forward

Team information
- Current team: Krida Prabodhini
- Number: 10

Senior career*
Years	Team	Apps	(Gls)
- SSA Soreng
2022–2023	Misaka United FC		
- Pink Panthers FC
2024–2025	Garhwal United		
2025–	Krida Prabodhini		

International career^{‡}
2022	India U17		
2025–	India	1	(2)
- * Club domestic league appearances and goals ‡ National team caps and goals as of 2 January 2025

Simran Gurung (born 18 March 2005) is an Indian professional footballer from Sikkim, who plays as a forward for the Indian Women's League 2 club Krida Prabodhini and the India women's national team.

== Early life ==
Gurung is from Jorethang, Namchi district, Sikkim. She is a product of State Academy for Girls run by the Sikkim Football Association at Soreng. She is the first girl from Sikkim to play for the senior India team.

== Career ==
Gurung was selected in the 23-player Indian squad and played the second of the two FIFA international friendlies against Maldives on 2 January 2025 at the Padukone-Dravid Centre for Sports Excellence in Bengaluru. She scored two goals on debut, in 62nd and 68th minute.

In December 2024, she played for Sikkim in the Rajmata Jijabai Trophy held in Narayanpur, Chhattisgarh. In the early rounds of the 29th Senior Nationals played at Agartala in October 2024, Gurung scored four goals in their first match where Sikkim beat Gujarat 4–0. In May 2024, she was part of the Sikkim team that played in group B of the 28th Senior Women's National Football Championship for Rajmata Jijabai Trophy in Kolkata. Earlier, she represented Sikkim in the 2nd North East Olympic Games held at Shillong.

== Career statistics ==
=== International ===
As of 2 January 2025

National team	Year	Caps	Goals
India	2025	1	2
Total		1	2

Scores and results list India's goal tally first.

List of international goals scored by Simran Gurung
No.	Date	Venue	Opponent	Score	Result	Competition
1.	2 January 2025	Padukone – Dravid Centre for Sports Excellence, Bengaluru, India	Maldives	9–1	11–1	Friendly
2.	2 January 2025	Padukone – Dravid Centre for Sports Excellence, Bengaluru, India	Maldives	10–1	11–1	Friendly
