= Shami Singamayum =

Indian footballer (born 2007)

Personal information
- Full name: Shami Singamayum
- Date of birth: 18 April 2007 (age 19)
- Place of birth: Manipur, India
- Position: Midfielder

Team information
- Current team: Punjab
- Number: 25

Youth career
- 2019–2024: Punjab

Senior career*
| Years | Team | Apps | (Gls) |
| 2024– | Punjab | 5 | (1) |

International career^{‡}
| 2025– | India U20 | 4 | (2) |
- * Club domestic league appearances and goals as of 16:30, 6 March 2025 (UTC) ‡ National team caps and goals as of 22:04, 18 May 2025 (UTC)

Shami Singamayum (Meitei: Singamayum Shami, born 18 April 2007) is a professional footballer who plays as a midfielder for Indian Super League club Punjab.

== Career ==
=== Club career ===
Shami was a product of the Punjab FC youth system, joining the club's academy at age 12. His senior team debut came in the Durand Cup against CISF Protectors, coming on as an 81st-minute substitute for Leon Augustine as Punjab won 3–0.

Shami made his Indian Super League debut for Punjab on 25 September 2024 at home against Hyderabad, coming in as a late substitute for Filip Mrzljak in an eventual 2–0 win for the Shers.

On 6 March 2025, Shami scored his first goal for Punjab FC, coincidentally away against Hyderabad FC, the team who he debuted against earlier in the season. After picking up a Petros Giakoumakis pass outside the box, he placed his shot into the net with his left foot. This goal gave him the record for being the youngest-ever ISL goal-scorer, at 17 years and 322 days. This was Punjab's final goal of the match, as it eventually ended 3–1 to Punjab.

=== International career ===
==== 2025 U-19 SAFF Championship ====
In April 2025, Shami was shortlisted for the probable squad of the India under-20 team that would play the 2025 SAFF U-19 Championship. He was finally selected in the 25 member squad, and was named as captain. In his debut, Shami scored a goal in a 8–0 victory against Sri Lanka.

Shami put on a man-of-the-match display in the final of the tournament against Bangladesh. As India won a wide free-kick around 30 yards from goal, Shami stepped up to take it. However, spotting the goalkeeper slightly off his line, Shami curled the free-kick into the top corner. This goal drew comparisons to Ronaldinho’s free-kick goal against England during the 2002 FIFA World Cup, due to the similarity of both goals. The match ended 1–1 and headed into a penalty shootout. There, Shami, taking the final penalty, scored to secure India's fourth SAFF U-19 Championship title.

== Career statistics ==
=== Club ===
As of 6 March 2025

| Club | Season | League | | | Cup | | AFC | | Total | |
| Club | Season | Division | Apps | Goals | Apps | Goals | Apps | Goals | Apps | Goals |
|---|---|---|---|---|---|---|---|---|---|---|
| Punjab | 2024–25 | Indian Super League | 5 | 1 | 2 (Note: Appearance(s) in Durand Cup) | 0 | — | | 7 | 1 |
| Career total | | | 5 | 1 | 2 | 0 | 0 | 0 | 7 | 1 |

== Honours ==
India U-20

- SAFF U-19 Championship: 2025

Individual

- 2025 SAFF U-19 Championship Most Valuable Player
