= Thanglalsoun Gangte =

Indian football player

Personal information
- Date of birth: 22 April 2006 (age 20)
- Place of birth: Imphal, Manipur, India
- Position: Striker

Team information
- Current team: Diamond Harbour
- Number: 24

Youth career
- 2019: Minerva Academy
- 2019–2023: Sudeva Delhi U18

Senior career*
Years	Team	Apps	(Gls)
2023–2025	Chennaiyin		
2025–	Diamond Harbour		

International career^{‡}
2022–2024	India U17	17	(9)
2024–	India U20	2	(1)
Medal record
Men's football
Representing India U-17
SAFF U-17 Championship
Gold medal – first place	2022 Sri Lanka
- * Club domestic league appearances and goals ‡ National team caps and goals as of 22:53, 29 September 2024 (UTC)

Thanglalsoun Gangte (born 22 April 2006) is an Indian professional footballer who plays as a forward for I-League club Diamond Harbour.

== Club career ==
=== Youth career ===
The son of a former local footballer from Imphal, Gangte was introduced to football at a very early age. After a brief stint at the Minerva Academy, he soon joined Sudeva Delhi in 2019. It was from the I-League club, that Gangte participated in the Delhi Futsal League and the Delhi Football League.

=== Chennaiyin ===
On 3 September 2023, 17 year-old Gangte signed his first senior contract with Indian Super League side Chennaiyin on a three-year contract, with an option to extend further by two years.

=== Diamond Harbour ===
On 2 July 2025, Gangte signed with Diamond Harbour, a club newly set to participate in the I-League. He is expected to begin his tenure by featuring in the club's campaign in the Calcutta Football League.

On 5 July 2025, Gangte scored his first goal for the club, netting a 90+5th-minute winner in a 1–0 victory over Wari Athletic Club in the Calcutta Football League.

== International career ==
=== India U17 ===
In September 2022, Gangte was selected to the India U17 squad for the 2022 SAFF U-17 Championship, held in Colombo, Sri Lanka. He finished the tournament as joint top scorer with 4 goals, clinching India U17's fourth championship and thus becoming the first team to successfully defend a junior SAFF crown.

=== India U20 ===
Gangte earned his first call-up to the India U20 squad for the 2024 SAFF U-20 Championship. On 26 August 2024, he made his debut for the team in the semi-final against Bangladesh, coming on as a substitute in the 58th minute for Malemngamba Singh Thokchom. The match ended 1–1 in regular time and went to penalties, where Gangte missed the first attempt, contributing to a 3–4 shootout defeat.

On 29 September 2024, in the 2025 AFC U‑20 Asian Cup qualifiers, Gangte scored against Laos, heading in the second goal in the 84th minute to secure a 2–0 victory.

== Career statistics ==
=== Club ===
As of 5 July 2025

Club	Season	League			National Cup		League Cup		AFC		Others		Total	
Club	Season	Division	Apps	Goals	Apps	Goals	Apps	Goals	Apps	Goals	Apps	Goals	Apps	Goals
Chennaiyin B	2024	RFDL	4	0	–		0	0	–		–		4	0
Diamond Harbour	2025–26	I-League	0	0	–		0	0	–		1 (Note: Appearance(s) in Calcutta Football League)	1	1	1
Career total			4	0	0	0	0	0	0	0	1	1	5	1

== Honours ==
India U-17

- SAFF U-17 Championship: 2022

Individual

- SAFF U-17 Championship top scorer: 2022
