= 2025 SAFF U-19 Championship =

Tournament details
- Host country: India
- Dates: 9–18 May 2025
- Teams: 6 (from 1 sub-confederation)
- Venue: 1 (in 1 host city)

Final positions
- Champions: India (4th title)
- Runners-up: Bangladesh
- Third place: Maldives; Nepal

Tournament statistics
- Matches played: 9
- Goals scored: 36 (4 per match)
- Attendance: 31,668 (3,519 per match)
- Top scorer: (India) Danny Meitei (5 goals)
- Best player: (India) Mohammed Arbas
- Best goalkeeper: (India) Suraj Singh Aheibam
- Fair play award: India

The 2025 SAFF U-19 Championship was the 7th edition of the SAFF U-19 Championship, an international football competition for men's under-19 national teams from South Asia region, organized by the South Asian Football Federation (SAFF). The tournament was played in Yupia, India from 9–18 May 2025.

On 18 May 2025, India won their fourth title by beating Bangladesh 4–3 on penalty in the final after a 1–1 draw at the end of the regular time.

== Venue ==
All matches were played at Golden Jubilee Stadium in Yupia, Arunachal Pradesh, India.

Yupia	Yupia is located in India
Golden Jubilee Stadium	Yupia is located in India
Capacity: 15,000	Yupia is located in India

== Participants teams ==
The following six national teams participated in the tournament.

Team	Appearances in the SAFF U-19 Championship	Previous best performance
Bangladesh	7th	Champions (2024)
Bhutan	6th	Fourth place (2017, 2019)
India (Host)	7th	Champions (2019, 2022, 2023)
Maldives	7th	Third place (2019)
Nepal	7th	Champions (2015, 2017)
Sri Lanka	4th	Group stage (2019, 2022)

== Players eligibility ==
Each team had to register a squad of minimum 16 and maximum 23 players. Players born on or after 1 January 2007 were eligible to compete in the tournament (as per FIFA eligibility rules of underage competitions).

== Squads ==
Team squads

Bangladesh	Bhutan	India	Maldives	Nepal	Sri Lanka
Goalkeepers: Md Ismail Hossain Mahin; Md Nahidul Islam; Raj Chowdury; Defenders: Ashikur Rahman; Md Mithu Chowdhury; Md Sifat Sahariar; Md Abdul Riyad Fahim; Salah Uddin Sahed; Md Delwar; Sani Das; Midfielders: Md Kamal Merdha; Nazmul Huda Faysal; Md Siya Omit; Md Ratul Hasan; Samuel Raksam; Forwards: Abdul Kadir; Farzad Syed Aftab; Md Mursed Ali; Md Joy Ahamed; Sree Sumon Soren; Md Manik; Md Rifat Kazi; Ashik; Head coach: Golam Robbani Choton	Goalkeepers: Tenzi Dorji; Kalchan Moktan Dorji; Tandin Penjor; Defenders: Ugyen Dorji; Ngawag Yonten; Kuenzang D Wangchuk; Chogyel S Sherab; Kencho Wangdi; Thinley Wangchuk; Tandin Tshewang; Ronit Rai; Tshering Dorji; Midfielders: Rinzin Dorji; Sonam Dorji; Thinley Yezer; Tandin Phuntsho; Kelden Dorjee; Chaya Dev Sharma; Pema Tshering; Rinchen Cheda; Forwards: Dendup Karma Tshering; Lham Tenzin; Kinley Dorji; Head coach: Sonam Dhendup	Goalkeepers: Aarush Hari; Aheibam Suraj Singh; Ramesh; Defenders: Ashik Adhikari; Takhellambam Bungson Singh; Jodric Abranches; Malemngamba Singh Thokchom; Mohammed Kaif; Sumit Sharma Brahmacharimayum; Sohum Utreja; Roshan Singh Thangjam; Midfielders: Danny Meitei Laishram; Gurnaj Singh Grewal; Md Arbash; Ningthoukhongjam Rishi Singh; Singamayum Shami; Forwards: Ahongshangbam Samson; Bharat Lairenjam; Chaphamayum Rohen Singh; Omang Dodum; Prashant Jajo; Hemneichung Lunkim; Yohaan Benjamin; Head coach: Bibiano Fernandes	Goalkeepers: Hussain Nihaal Mohamed; Xahran Hassan Ziyad; Mohamed Yais; Defenders: Ahmed Athoof Rasheed; Mohamed Ravaau; Eydhan Ahmed Moosa; Hassan Haisham Hamid; Ahmed Mikyal Mueen; Mohamed Laamih Imthiyaz; Shahudhaan Abdul Ghani; Ahmed Hamees Areef; Midfielders: Naail Yoosuf; Ahzam Rasheed; Alson Ibrahim; Mohamed Shamhaan; Ahmed Hamdhaan Azleen; Forwards: Yoosuf Ayaan Amir; Aidh Mohamed Jaweez; Nassah Ibrahim Nasir; Ethan Ibrahim Zaki; Mohamed Izaan Ali; Ashham Ibrahim Mohamed; Anoof Abdulla; Head coach: Ahmed Shakir	Goalkeepers: Bhakta Bahadur Pariyar; Upendra Lwagun; Bishesh Baniya; Defenders: Roshan Tamang; Rohan Moktan; Prashant Moktan; Kushahang Nembang; Madan Paudel; Ram Thapa; Bijay Urba; Siddhant Khadka; Midfielders: Krishna Bahadur Ale; Krish Thapa Magar; Saroj Darlami; Lachhu Thapa; Sabin Kumar Lungeli Magar; Ranjeet Lama; Subash Bam; Bigyan Khadka; Forwards: Pawan Pakhrin; Dharbendra Kunwar; Sujan Dangol; Prasun Tamang; Head coach: Urjan Shrestha	Goalkeepers: Dassanayake Anuk Shahil; Nadal Aaron Senapala; Mohamed Rikas Muhammed; Defenders: Zawahir Ayman Riyas; Edirisinghe Omith; Mohamed Ramlan Abdul Rahman; Abdul Hameed Mohammed Irfan; Mohamed Shiras Mohamed Shahid; Mohamed Rizwan Mohamed Aashif; Suthakar Roisan Bright; Midfielders: Vijayaratnam Haris; Mohamed Hafeef Akram; Aidan Francis Perera; Mohamed Siddeek Mohamed Maziyad; Mohamed Faris Umar; Nassim Abdallah Faiz; Zafarullah Zakariyya; Forwards: Luckman Rashad Shihab; Kalinga Anupa Pabasara; Silmy Mohamed Hussain; Mohammadu Hussain Abdullah; Krawege Hirun Mirasha; Kaleelullah Mohamed Katheem; Head coach: (Maldives) Imran Mohamed

== Draw ==
The draw ceremony of the tournament was held on 11 March 2025.

Pot 1	Pot 2	Pot 3
India (hosts); Maldives	Nepal; Bhutan	Bangladesh; Sri Lanka

=== Draw result ===
Group A
Pos	Team
A1	Maldives
A2	Bhutan
A3	Bangladesh

Group B
Pos	Team
B1	India
B2	Nepal
B3	Sri Lanka

== Match officials ==
Referees

- (Bangladesh) SM Jashim Akhter
- (India) Harish Kundu (†)
- (Maldives) Zaheer Hussain (†)
- (Nepal) Nabindra Maharjan (†)
- (Sri Lanka) Md Jafran Athambawa (†)
- (Bhutan) Ugyen Penjor (†)

Assistant Referees & Fourth Official

- (Bangladesh) Shohrab Hossain
- (Bangladesh) Sourav Sarker
- (Bhutan) Tshering Phuntsho
- (Maldives) Raeef Rauf
- (Nepal) Prakash Bhujel
- (Sri Lanka) L. Dhanushka Sampath

(†): Also performed as assistant referee in some matches.

== Group stage ==
- Times listed are UTC+05:30 Indian Standard Time (IST).

Key to colours in group tables
Group winners and runners-up advance to the semi-finals

Tiebreakers

Teams are ranked according to points (3 points for a win, 1 point for a draw, 0 points for a loss), and if tied on points, the following tiebreaking criteria are applied, in the order given, to determine the rankings.

1. Points in head-to-head matches among tied teams;
2. Goal difference in head-to-head matches among tied teams;
3. Goals scored in head-to-head matches among tied teams;
4. If more than two teams are tied, and after applying all head-to-head criteria above, a subset of teams are still tied, all head-to-head criteria above are reapplied exclusively to this subset of teams;
5. Goal difference in all group matches;
6. Goals scored in all group matches;
7. Penalty shoot-out if only two teams are tied and they met in the last round of the group;
8. Disciplinary points (yellow card = 1 point, red card as a result of two yellow cards = 3 points, direct red card = 3 points, yellow card followed by direct red card = 4 points);
9. Drawing of lots.

=== Group A ===
Pos	Team	Pld	W	D	L	GF	GA	GD	Pts	Qualification
1	Bangladesh	2	1	1	0	5	2	+3	4	Advance to knockout stage
2	Maldives	2	0	2	0	4	4	0	2	Advance to knockout stage
3	Bhutan	2	0	1	1	2	5	−3	1	

Source: Soccerway
9 May 2025
16:00

Bangladesh	2–2	Maldives
Faysal 13'; Kazi 45'	Report	Abdulla 57'; Zaki 73'

Golden Jubilee Stadium, Yupia
Attendance: 1,836
Referee: Md Jafran Athambawa (Sri Lanka)

11 May 2025
16:00

Bhutan	0–3	Bangladesh
	Report	Mursed 13'; Soran 28'; Faysal 90+6'

Golden Jubilee Stadium, Yupia
Referee: Nabindra Maharjan (Nepal)

13 May 2025
16:00

Maldives	2–2	Bhutan
A. Mohammed 77'; I. Mohammed 90+5'	Report	Tenzin 44'; Sherab 90+7'

Golden Jubilee Stadium, Yupia
Attendance: 1,150
Referee: Harish Kundu (India)

=== Group B ===
Pos	Team	Pld	W	D	L	GF	GA	GD	Pts	Qualification
1	India (H)	2	2	0	0	12	0	+12	6	Advance to knockout stage
2	Nepal	2	1	0	1	5	4	+1	3	Advance to knockout stage
3	Sri Lanka	2	0	0	2	0	13	−13	0	

Source: Soccerway
(H) Hosts
9 May 2025
19:30

India	8–0	Sri Lanka
Jajo 17', 62'; Meitei 26', 31', 50'; Arbas 41'; Dodum 49'; Shami 81'	Report

Golden Jubilee Stadium, Yupia
Attendance: 5,328
Referee: SM Jasim Akhter (Bangladesh)

11 May 2025
19:30

Sri Lanka	0–5	Nepal
	Report	Dangol 45+3'; Kunwar 61'; Bam 76'; Khadka 89'; Thapa 90+3'

Golden Jubilee Stadium, Yupia
Attendance: 1,356
Referee: Harish Kundu (India)

13 May 2025
19:30

India	4–0	Nepal
Roshan 28'; Dodum 29'; Rohen 75'; Meitei 83'	Report

Golden Jubilee Stadium, Yupia
Attendance: 2,500
Referee: Zaheer Hussain (Maldives)

== Knockout stage ==
Semi-finals
16 May – Yupia
Bangladesh	2
Nepal	1
16 May – Yupia
India	3
Maldives	0

Final
18 May – Yupia
Bangladesh	1 (3)
India (p)	1 (4)

=== Semi-finals ===
16 May 2025
15:30

Bangladesh	2–1	Nepal
Rahman 73'; Faysal 81'	Report	Dangol 87'

Golden Jubilee Stadium, Yupia
Attendance: 1,583
Referee: Ugyen Penjor (Bhutan)

16 May 2025
19:30

India	3–0	Maldives
Meitei 14'; Dodum 21'; Jajo 66'	Report

Golden Jubilee Stadium, Yupia
Attendance: 5,126
Referee: SM Jasim Akhter (Bangladesh)

=== Final ===
18 May 2025
19:00

Bangladesh	1–1	India
Ahmed 61'	Report	Shami 2'
Penalties
Chowdhury (penalty scored); Murshed (penalty scored); Ahmed (penalty scored); Faysal (penalty missed); Sahed (penalty missed)	3–4	(penalty scored) Arbash; (penalty missed) R. Singh; (penalty scored) N. R. Singh; (penalty scored) Abranches; (penalty scored) Shami

Golden Jubilee Stadium, Yupia
Attendance: 12,789
Referee: Md Jafran Athambawa (Sri Lanka)

== Winners ==
7th SAFF U-19 Championship 2025 Champions

India
Fourth title

== Statistics ==
=== Goalscorers ===
There have been 36 goals scored in 9 matches, for an average of 4 goals per match.

5 goals

- (India) Danny Meitei

3 goals

- (Bangladesh) Nazmul Huda Faysal
- (India) Omang Dodum
- (India) Prashant Jajo

2 goals

- (Nepal) Sujan Dangol
- (India) Singamayum Shami

1 goal

- (Bangladesh) Md Rifat Kazi
- (Bangladesh) Murshed Ali
- (Bangladesh) Sree Sumon Soren
- (Bangladesh) Ashikur Rahman
- (Bangladesh) Md Joy Ahamed
- (Bhutan) Lham Tenzin
- (Bhutan) Chhogyel Sherab
- (India) Mohammed Arbas
- (India) Roshan Singh
- (India) Rohen Singh
- (Maldives) Ethan Ibrahim Zaki
- (Maldives) Anoof Abdulla
- (Maldives) Ibrahim Mohammed
- (Maldives) Aidh Mohammed
- (Nepal) Dharbendra Kunwar
- (Nepal) Subhash Bam
- (Nepal) Bigyan Khadka
- (Nepal) Lachhu Thapa

Source: GSA

=== Hat-tricks ===
No.	Player	For	Against	Result	Date	Ref
1.	Danny Meitei	**India**	Sri Lanka	8–0	9 May 2025	

Note: Bold indicates the winning team.

== Awards ==
The following awards were given at the conclusion of the tournament:

Fair Play Award	Best goalkeeper	Top scorer(s)	Most valuable player
India	(India) Suraj Singh Aheibam	(India) Danny Meitei	(India) Mohammed Arbas

== Broadcasting ==
Territory	Broadcaster(s)	Reference
No restricted territory	Sportzworkz^{(YouTube channel)}	2025 SAFF U19 matches playlist on YouTube

== See also ==
- 2025–26 AFC Women's Champions League
- 2025 SAFF U-17 Women's Championship
- 2025 SAFF U-20 Women's Championship
