= Nazmul Huda Faysal =

Bangladeshi footballer

Personal information
- Date of birth: 5 September 2009 (age 17)
- Place of birth: Brahmanbaria, Bangladesh
- Position: Attacking midfielder

Team information
- Current team: Dhaka Abahani

Youth career
- BFF Elite Academy

Senior career*
Years	Team	Apps	(Gls)
2025	Chittagong Abahani	0	(0)
2025–2026	PWD	4	(1)
2026–	Dhaka Abahani	0	(0)

International career^{‡}
2024–	Bangladesh U17	16	(6)
2025–	Bangladesh U20	11	(3)
2026–	Bangladesh Olympic	3	(0)
Medal record
Men's football
Representing Bangladesh
SAFF U-20 Championship
Winner	2026 Maldives	Team
- * Club domestic league appearances and goals as of 7 September 2026 ‡ National team caps and goals as of 8 June 2026

Nazmul Huda Faysal (Bengali: নাজমুল হুদা ফয়সাল, Bengali pronunciation: [nazmul ɦuda fɔjsal]) is a Bangladeshi professional footballer who plays as an attacking midfielder for Bangladesh Football League club Dhaka Abahani.

== Early years ==
Nazmul Huda Faysal was born in Brahmanbaria District of Chittagong Division.

== Club career ==
In July 2025, Faysal began his professional football career with Bangladesh Premier League club Chittagong Abahani.

Faysal joined Dhaka Abahani for the 2026–27 Bangladesh Football League.

== International career ==
=== Youth ===
Faysal was named in the Bangladesh U-17 squad for the 2025 AFC U-17 Asian Cup qualifiers, where he scored four goals in four appearances, including all four goals in a single match against the Macau U-17 team.

He was selected as the captain to lead the Bangladesh U-19 team for the 2025 SAFF U-19 Championship. He led the team to the final, contributing with 3 goals in 4 matches.

He won the Best Player award in the 2025 SAFF U-17 Championship.

== Honors ==
Bangladesh U20

- SAFF U-20 Championship: 2026
