= Bangladesh national under-20 football team =

National association football team

Bangladesh Under-20
- Nicknames: বাংলার বাঘ (Bengal Tigers); লাল-সবুজ (Red and Green)
- Association: Bangladesh Football Federation
- Confederation: AFC (Asia)
- Sub-confederation: SAFF (South Asia)
- Head coach: Atiqur Rahman Meshu
- Captain: Mithu Chowdhury
- Home stadium: National Stadium; BSSS Mostafa Kamal Stadium
- FIFA code: BAN
First colours	Second colours

First international
- Bangladesh 0–2 Philippines (Kuwait City, Kuwait; 5 April 1975)

Biggest win
- Bangladesh 5–0 Maldives (Malé, Maldives; 29 July 1996)

Biggest defeat
- Bangladesh 0–6 India (Doha, Qatar; 16 October 2002); Bangladesh 0–6 Iraq (Dhaka, Bangladesh; 27 October 2011); Bangladesh 0–6 Iraq (Abril, Iraq; 8 October 2013)

AFC U-20 Asian Cup
- Appearances: 6 (first in 1975)
- Best result: 5th (1980)

SAFF U-20 Championship
- Appearances: 8 (first in 2015)
- Best result: Champions (2024, 2026)
Medal record
Men's football
SAFF U-20 Championship
Gold medal – first place	2024 Nepal	Team
Gold medal – first place	2026 Maldives	Team
Silver medal – second place	2017 Bhutan	Team
Silver medal – second place	2019 Nepal	Team
Silver medal – second place	2022 India	Team
Silver medal – second place	2025 India	Team

The Bangladesh national under-20 football team represents Bangladesh in international youth football competitions in SAFF U-20 Championship, AFC U-20 Asian Cup and FIFA U-20 World Cup, as well as any other under-20, under-19 & under-18 international football tournaments. The team is operated under the Bangladesh Football Federation.

They have qualified for the AFC U-20 Asian Cup six previous times and is yet to qualify for FIFA U-20 World Cup. The team taken part in four editions of the SAFF U-20 Championship, and won their maiden title in 2024. Since 2022, Bangladesh U-20 began taking part in all stages of the AFC Championship. Previously, the U-19 team participated in the tournament.

== History ==
=== 1975−2000 ===
After becoming affiliated with the Asian Football Confederation in 1973, the Bangladesh team were given direct entry into the 1975 AFC Youth Championship & 1977 AFC Youth Championship, although they ended both tournaments without achieving a single victory. The Bangladesh Football Federation however, failed to arrange a regular youth setup as the team did not participate during the 1974 and 1976 editions of the tournament even after acquiring AFC membership.

The 1978 AFC Youth Championship was held in Dhaka, becoming the first major football tournament held in Bangladesh. Coaches Abdur Rahim and Abdus Sadek were given the task of building the team with three months to go. However, West Germany's Werner Bickelhaupt came as the head coach of the team on the initiative of FIFA. Bickelhaupt, the first foreign football coach of Bangladesh's national team at any level, later served as the coach of the senior team as well. Bickelhaupt's team consisted of: Suhas Barua, Moinul Karim, Dewan Arefin Tutul, Abul Hossain, Sawpan Das, Mukul, Kawsar Ali, Abdus Salam, Md. Badal, Ashish Bhadra, Aslam, Hasanuzzaman Bablu, Kazi Anwar, Hasan Ahmadul Haque, Golam Rabbani Helal, Salam Murshedy, Mohammed Mohsin (captain). Standby: Abdul Halim, Majid, Ghaffer, Moni, Wahiduzzaman Pintu. The team leader was Zillur Rahman, joint manager Nabi Chowdhury and AQZ Islam Kislu and assistant coach Abdur Rahim. Bangladesh were drawn into Group C with Singapore, North Yemen, Bahrain and Kuwait. All games were held at the Bangabandhu National Stadium.

Bangladesh's first match was against Singapore. A quick double from Singapore striker Donang, saw the hosts fall behind 2–0. However, goals from Ashish Bhadra and captain Mohsin meant the game finished 2–2. In the next game against North Yemen, the Bangladesh team created history by winning the game 1–0, thanks to a lone goal by striker Hassan Ahmedul Haque. However, the next match saw Bangladesh being defeated 2–0 by Kuwait, the team ended the tournament with a 1–1 draw against Bahrain, due to a penalty taken by Moshin. The draw meant Bangladesh had failed to reach the quarter-finals finishing a point behind Bahrain, even after going toe to toe with much stronger opposition. Bangladesh then took part in the 1980 AFC Youth Championship, thanks to Sheikh Aslam's goals during qualification. The team finished bottom of their group in the main tournament, having been drawn in a tough group Bangladesh managed earn points against South Korea and Qatar.

Bangladesh almost managed to qualify for the 1985 AFC Youth Championship, after finishing second in their qualifying group alongside South Korea, the team were knocked out of the qualifiers after losing 1–0 in the semi-finals to China. Bangladesh ended up losing the 3rd place match to South Korea. Bangladesh did not participate in the next two out of the five Youth Championship qualifiers, before again qualifying in 1996 after defeating Maldives 8–0 in aggregate. However, in the main tournament, the team disappointed conceding a total of twelve goals in four games, salvaging only a goalless draw against Iran.

=== 2000−present ===
After being unfortunate to not qualify for the 2000 AFC Youth Championship, the Bangladesh team managed to qualify for the 2002 AFC Youth Championship, held in Qatar. Nevertheless, they failed to win a single game during the entirety of the Championship. Since 2002, the Bangladesh U20 team was unable to take part in a major tournament until the launching of SAFF U-20 Championship, in 2015. The 2015 SAFF U-19 Championship which was the tournaments first edition was held in Nepal. Rohit Sarkar and Mannaf Rabby scored as Bangladesh defeated Bhutan in their maiden SAFF U-18 Championship game. After advancing to the semi-final as group runner-up, Bangladesh came up short during the penalty shoot-out to India as Rahmat Mia missed the last penalty.

Mahabub Hossain Roksy's team made a remarkable comeback during the opening game of the 2017 SAFF U-18 Championship. After falling 3–0 behind, goals from Jafar Iqbal, Rahmat Mia and Mahbubur Rahman saw Bangladesh win the game 4–3. However, after losing to Nepal 2–1, Bangladesh finished in second place due to head to head results. Roxy's team also showed some promising displays during the 2018 AFC U-19 Championship qualifiers (previously known as the AFC Youth Championship) although they failed to qualify once more. Atikuzzaman's owngoal in the 94th minute against Uzbekistan, lead to Bangladesh's only defeat during the qualifiers. Bangladesh reached the final of the 2019 SAFF U-18 Championship, only to lose to India 1–2. Bangladesh conceded the first goal within two minutes and although they were down to 10-men after Mohammad Ridoy was sent off after a scuffle with the Indian players, captain Yeasin Arafat equalized just before half-time, but the referee sent him off due to his celebrations and Indian striker Ravi Rana scored the winner in stoppage time to seal his sides victory. The teams fate kept on worsening as, they finished bottom of their group during the 2020 AFC U-19 Championship qualifiers.

Due to the ongoing domestic league season, Bangladesh team for the 2022 SAFF U-20 Championship mainly consisted U-17 players from the BFF Elite Academy and the Bangladesh Championship League. The team was impressive throughout the tournament but had similar fate to the previous edition, as they lost to India in the final.

== Coaches ==
=== Coaching staff ===
As of 4 September 2026

Position	Name
Interim head coach	(Bangladesh) Atiqur Rahman Meshu
Assistant coach	(Bangladesh) Atiqur Rahman Meshu
Fitness trainer & Asssitant Coach	(Italy) Dragos Alin Hogea
Team Manager	(Bangladesh) Sameed Quasem
Goalkeeper coach	(Spain) Jose Maria Moreno Martinez
Physio	(Bangladesh) KM Shakib
Media Officer	(Bangladesh) Khalid Nowmee
Video analyst	(Bangladesh) Abdullah Nasif Hassan
Team observer	(Bangladesh) Md Ashik Sayeed
Team observer	(Bangladesh) Md Jahid Hossain Joni

=== Manager history ===
Year	Head coach
1975	(Bangladesh) Mohammed Noor Hossain
1977	(Bangladesh) Anwar Hossain
1978	(West Germany) Werner Bickelhaupt
1980	(Bangladesh) Abdul Gafur Baloch
1984	(Bangladesh) Golam Sarwar Tipu
1988	(West Germany) Werner Bickelhaupt
1996	(Germany) Otto Pfister
1998	(Bangladesh) Hasanuzzaman Bablu
2000	(Bangladesh) Abu Yusuf
2002	(Austria) György Kottán
2003	(Bangladesh) Abu Yusuf
2009	(Bangladesh) Shafiqul Islam Manik
2011	(North Macedonia) Nikola Ilievski
2013	(Netherlands) René Koster
2015–2016	(Bangladesh) Saiful Bari Titu
2017	(Bangladesh) Mahabub Hossain Roksy
2017–2018	(England) Andrew Ord
2019	(England) Andy Peter Turner
2022	(England) Paul Smalley (interim)
2022–2023	(Bangladesh) Rashed Ahmed Pappu
2024	(Bangladesh) Maruful Haque
2025	(Bangladesh) Golam Rabbani Choton
2026	(England) Mark Cox
2026	(England) Gerard Jones

== Squad ==
=== Current U-20 squad ===
The following 23 players were named in the squad for the 2027 AFC U-20 Asian Cup qualification.

No.	Pos.	Player	Date of birth (age)	Club
	GK	SP Rafiz	21 November 2007 (age 19)	(Bangladesh Football Federation) Dhaka Abahani
	GK	Raj Chowdhury	10 August 2009 (age 17)	(Bangladesh Football Federation) Dhaka Abahani
	GK	Md Nahidul Islam	3 May 2008 (age 18)	(Bangladesh Football Federation) Rahmatganj MFS
	DF	Masud Rana		(Bangladesh Football Federation) Dhaka Abahani
	DF	Md Siam Omit	6 September 2009 (age 17)	(Bangladesh Football Federation) Bangladesh Police
	DF	Md Ikramul Islam	1 January 2010 (age 16)	(Bangladesh Football Federation) PWD
	DF	Md Abdul Riyad Fahim (Captain)	8 August 2008 (age 18)	(Bangladesh Football Federation) Dhaka Abahani
	DF	Zidane Yousuf	22 September 2007 (age 19)	(The Football Association) Walton & Hersham
	DF	Sharif Uddin Nirob	1 January 2008 (age 18)	(Bangladesh Football Federation) Bangladesh Police
	DF	Ihsan Habib Riduan	16 December 2009 (age 16)	(Bangladesh Football Federation) PWD
	DF	Sheikh Sangram		(Bangladesh Football Federation) Khelaghar
	MF	Md Mithu Chowdhury	10 November 2008 (age 18)	(Bangladesh Football Federation) Fortis
	MF	Saiful Islam	28 March 2008 (age 18)	(Bangladesh Football Federation) Mohammedan
	MF	Md Kamal Merdha	12 December 2009 (age 16)	(Bangladesh Football Federation) Khelaghar
	MF	Nazmul Huda Faysal	5 September 2009 (age 17)	(Bangladesh Football Federation) PWD
	MF	Eshan Malik	13 December 2009 (age 16)	(Football Australia) Parramatta U18
	FW	Md Manik	11 December 2009 (age 16)	(Bangladesh Football Federation) PWD
	FW	Adam Abbas	24 February 2007 (age 19)	Free Agent
	FW	Raisul Islam Rahid		(Bangladesh Football Federation) PWD
	FW	Md Opu Rahman		(Bangladesh Football Federation) City Club
	FW	Md Joy Ahamed		(Bangladesh Football Federation) Mohammedan
	FW	Md Mahe Khan	11 February 2007 (age 19)	(The Football Association) Rushden & Higham United
	FW	Farzad Syed Aftab	31 July 2007 (age 19)	(Croatian Football Federation) NK Metalac Sisak U19

==== Recent U-20 call-ups ====
The following players were called up to the squad in the past 12 months.

Pos.	Player	Date of birth (age)	Caps	Goals	Club	Latest call-up
GK	Md Ismail Hossain Mahin	28 October 2007 (age 19)			(Bangladesh) Mohammedan SC	2026 SAFF U-20 Championship
DF	Sani Das	2 March 2008 (age 18)			(Bangladesh) Fortis	2026 SAFF U-20 Championship
DF	Declan Sullivan	28 November 2007 (age 18)			(United States) FC Delco Academy	2026 SAFF U-20 Championship
DF	Ashikur Rahman	17 June 2009 (age 17)			(Bangladesh) PWD	2026 SAFF U-20 Championship
DF	Md Yusuf Ali	10 August 2007 (age 19)			(Bangladesh) Bashundhara Kings	2026 SAFF U-20 Championship
DF	Md Sifat Sahariar	31 August 2007 (age 19)			(Bangladesh) Rahmatganj MFS	2026 SAFF U-20 Championship^{PRE}
DF	Salauddin Shahed	27 October 2008 (age 18)			(Bangladesh) Brothers Union	2026 SAFF U-20 Championship^{PRE}
DF	Sushrata Mondal				(Canada) Dawson College	2026 SAFF U-20 Championship^{INJ}
MF	Samuel Raksam	10 November 2007 (age 19)			(Bangladesh) Bashundhara Kings	2026 SAFF U-20 Championship
MF	Chandon Roy	4 May 2007 (age 19)			(Bangladesh) Bashundhara Kings	2026 SAFF U-20 Championship
MF	Ibrahim Nawaz	30 March 2008 (age 18)			(England) HRBFC Isthmian Youth Team	2026 SAFF U-20 Championship
MF	Md Ratul Hasan	2 February 2007 (age 19)			(Bangladesh) Arambagh KS	2026 SAFF U-20 Championship^{PRE}
MF	Shafiq Rahman Tihim	12 October 2008 (age 18)			(Bangladesh) Fortis	2026 SAFF U-20 Championship^{PRE}
FW	Sree Sumon Soren	11 June 2007 (age 19)			Bangladesh Police	2026 SAFF U-20 Championship
FW	Murshed Ali	20 December 2008 (age 17)			(Bangladesh) Fortis	2026 SAFF U-20 Championship
FW	Md Rifat Kazi	18 October 2009 (age 17)			(Bangladesh) Khelaghar	2026 SAFF U-20 Championship
FW	Ronan Sullivan	28 November 2007 (age 18)			(United States) Philadelphia Union Academy	2026 SAFF U-20 Championship
FW	Moltagim Alam Hemal	10 December 2007 (age 18)			(Bangladesh) Brothers Union	2026 SAFF U-20 Championship
FW	Md Ashik	7 July 2009 (age 17)			(Bangladesh) City Club	
FW	Amir Sami				(United States) Long Island Slammers	2026 SAFF U-20 Championship^{PRE}
^{INJ} Withdrew due to injury^{PRE} Preliminary squad / standby^{TP} Training partner^{WD} Player withdrew from the squad due to non-injury issue.

=== Current U-19 squad ===
The following 23 players list were named in the squad for the 2025 SAFF U-19 Championship.

No.	Pos.	Player	Date of birth (age)	Club
1	GK	Md Ismail Hossain Mahin	28 October 2007 (age 19)	(Bangladesh Football Federation) Mohammedan SC
23	GK	Md Nahidul Islam		(Bangladesh Football Federation) BFF Elite Academy
13	GK	Raj Chowdhury		(Bangladesh Football Federation) BFF Elite Academy
2	DF	Sani Das		(Bangladesh Football Federation) BFF Elite Academy
3	DF	Md Abdul Riyad Fahim		(Bangladesh Football Federation) BFF Elite Academy
4	DF	Md Mithu Chowdhury		(Bangladesh Football Federation) Brothers Union
5	DF	Ashikur Rahman		(Bangladesh Football Federation) PWD SC
14	DF	Md Siam Omit		(Bangladesh Football Federation) Bangladesh Police
15	DF	Md Sifat Sahariar		(Bangladesh Football Federation) BFF Elite Academy
21	DF	Salauddin Shahed		(Bangladesh Football Federation) BFF Elite Academy
22	DF	Md Delwar		(Bangladesh Football Federation) Farashganj SC
6	MF	Md Kamal Merdha		(Bangladesh Football Federation) BFF Elite Academy
8	MF	Samuel Raksam		(Bangladesh Football Federation) Bashundhara Kings
10	MF	Nazmul Huda Faysal (Captain)		(Bangladesh Football Federation) Chittagong Abahani
18	MF	Md Ratul Hasan		(Bangladesh Football Federation) BFF Elite Academy
7	FW	Sree Sumon Soren		(Bangladesh Football Federation) Brothers Union
9	FW	Md Manik		(Bangladesh Football Federation) BFF Elite Academy
12	FW	Abdul Kadir		(Italian Football Federation) Fermana U18
11	FW	Murshed Ali		(Bangladesh Football Federation) Fortis
16	FW	Md Ashik		(Bangladesh Football Federation) BFF Elite Academy
17	FW	Md Joy Ahamed		(Bangladesh Football Federation) BFF Elite Academy
19	FW	Farzad Syed Aftab		(Croatian Football Federation) NK Metalac Sisak U19
20	FW	Md Rifat Kazi		(Bangladesh Football Federation) BFF Elite Academy

==== Recent U-19 call-ups ====
The following players were called up to the squad in the past 12 months.

Pos.	Player	Date of birth (age)	Caps	Goals	Club	Latest call-up
^{INJ} Withdrew due to injury^{PRE} Preliminary squad / standby^{TP} Training partner^{WD} Player withdrew from the squad due to non-injury issue.

== Fixtures and results ==
Matches in the last 12 months, and future scheduled matches
Win Draw Loss Fixture

=== 2026 ===
24 March 2026 2026 SAFF U-20 GS	Bangladesh	2–0	Pakistan	Malé, Maldives
16:45 BST (UTC+6)	R. Sullivan 54', 72'	Report		Stadium: National Football Stadium; Attendance: 2,550; Referee: Mohamed Rideewita Withana Chirantha (Sri Lanka)

28 March 2026 2026 SAFF U-20 GS	Bangladesh	1–1	India	Malé, Maldives
16:45 BST (UTC+6)	Riyad 45+10'	Report	V. Yadav 17'	Stadium: National Stadium; Attendance: 3,932; Referee: Raeef Rauf (Maldives)

1 April 2026 2026 SAFF U-20 SF	Bangladesh	1–0	Nepal	Malé, Maldives
16:45 BST (UTC+6)	Manik 11'	Report		Stadium: National Stadium; Attendance: 3,910; Referee: Jatinder Singh (India)

3 April 2026 2026 SAFF U-20 Final	Bangladesh	0–0 (4–3 p)	India	Malé, Maldives
21:00 BST (UTC+6)		Report		Stadium: National Stadium; Attendance: 4,100; Referee: Umesh Bidari (Nepal)
	Penalties
	Murshed (penalty scored); Chandon (penalty scored); Fahim (penalty scored); Raksam (penalty missed); R. Sullivan (penalty scored)		(penalty missed) Rishi; (penalty scored) Arbash; (penalty scored) Samson; (penalty scored) Vishal; (penalty missed) Dodum

18 August 2026 Friendly	Bangladesh	Cancelled	United Arab Emirates	Thailand
		Report
Note: Cancelled due to visa complications.

24 August 2026 Closed Door friendly	Bangladesh	2–2	(Bangladesh) Fortis	Dhaka
BST	Riduan (?); Siam Omit (?)	Report	Rony (?)

31 August 2026 2027 AFC U-20 Q	Bangladesh	0–2	Uzbekistan	Tashkent, Uzbekistan
20:00 BST		Report	Saydaliev 19'; Kuvonchbek 46'	Stadium: Do'stlik Stadium; Referee: Wiwat Jumpaoon (Thailand)

3 September 2026 2027 AFC U-20 Q	Bangladesh	0–3	Syria	Tashkent, Uzbekistan
17:00 BST		Report	Alam 44'; Marios 45+1'; Al Najar 90'	Stadium: Do'stlik Stadium; Referee: Ammar Ashkanani (Kuwait)

6 September 2026 2027 AFC U-20 Q	India	3–0	Bangladesh	Tashkent, Uzbekistan
17:00 BST	Laishram 25'; Yadav 60'; Arbash 79'	Report		Stadium: Do'stlik Stadium; Referee: Yudi Nurcahya (Indonesia)

== Competition records ==
=== FIFA U-20 World Cup ===
FIFA U-20 World Cup
Host/Year	Result	Position	Pld	W	D*	L	GF	GA
(Tunisia) 1977 to (Poland) 2019	Did not qualify							
(Indonesia) 2021	Cancelled							
(Argentina) 2023	Did not qualify							
(Chile) 2025	Did not qualify							
(Azerbaijan) (Uzbekistan) 2027	Did not qualify							
Total	–	0/25	–	–	–	–	–	–

=== AFC U-20 Asian Cup ===
AFC U-20 Asian Cup										Qualification					
Year	Result	Position	Pld	W	D	L	GF	GA	Squad	Pld	W	D	L	GF	GA
(Malaysia) 1959 to (Japan) 1971	Part of Pakistan									Part of Pakistan					
(Thailand) 1972 (Thailand) 1974	Did not participate									Did not participate					
(Kuwait) 1975	Group Stage	16/19	4	0	0	4	2	9	N/A	Directly qualified					
(Thailand) 1976	Did not participate									Did not participate					
(Iran) 1977	Group Stage	12/13	2	0	0	2	0	7	N/A	Directly qualified					
(Bangladesh) 1978	Group Stage	10/19	4	1	2	1	4	5	N/A	Directly qualified as a host					
(Thailand) 1980	Round Robin	5/5	4	0	2	2	1	7	N/A	4	3	0	1	9	3
(Thailand) 1982	Did not participate									Did not participate					
(United Arab Emirates) 1985	Did not qualify									5	2	1	2	3	3
(Saudi Arabia) 1986	Did not participate									Did not participate					
(Qatar) 1988	Did not qualify									2	0	1	1	1	5
(Indonesia) 1990	Did not qualify									4	1	2	1	5	3
(United Arab Emirates) 1992	Did not qualify									4	2	2	0	4	1
(Indonesia) 1994	Did not qualify									3	0	1	2	2	9
(South Korea) 1996	Group Stage	9/10	4	0	1	3	3	12	N/A	2	2	0	0	8	0
(Thailand) 1998	Did not qualify									3	2	0	1	4	6
(Iran) 2000	Did not qualify									3	2	1	0	7	2
(Qatar) 2002	Group Stage	12/12	3	0	0	3	0	13	N/A	3	2	1	0	8	2
(Malaysia) 2004	Did not qualify									2	1	1	0	2	1
(India) 2006	Did not qualify									2	0	0	2	0	7
(Saudi Arabia) 2008	Withdrew									Withdrew					
(China) 2010	Did not qualify									5	1	1	3	6	14
(United Arab Emirates) 2012	Did not qualify									4	1	0	3	3	11
(Myanmar) 2014	Did not qualify									2	1	0	1	1	6
(Bahrain) 2016	Did not qualify									3	1	1	1	3	5
(Indonesia) 2018	Did not qualify									4	2	1	1	5	1
(Uzbekistan) 2020	Cancelled									3	0	1	2	2	6
(Uzbekistan) 2023	Did not qualify									4	2	1	1	5	4
(China) 2025	Did not qualify									4	1	1	2	5	11
(China) 2027	Did not qualify									3	0	0	3	0	8
Total	0 Titles	6/43	21	1	5	15	10	53	—	69	26	16	27	83	108

=== SAFF U-18/U-19/U-20 Championship ===
SAFF U-18/U-19/U-20 Championship records
Hosts Year	Result	Position	GP	W	D*	L	GS	GA
(Nepal) 2015	Semi-finals	3/6	3	1	0	2	3	2
(Bhutan) 2017	Runners-up	2/5	4	3	0	1	9	5
(Nepal) 2019	Runners-up	2/6	4	2	1	1	8	2
(India) 2022	Runners-up	2/5	5	3	1	1	10	8
(Nepal) 2023	Group stage	6/6	2	0	0	2	3	7
(Nepal) 2024	Champions	1/6	4	2	1	1	8	4
(India) 2025	Runners-up	2/6	4	2	2	0	8	4
(Maldives) 2026	Champions	1/7	4	3	1	0	4	1
Total	2 Titles	8/8	30	16	6	8	53	33

== Head-to-head records ==
The following table shows Bangladesh's head-to-head record in the Asian and regional competitions.

As of 31 August 2026

Opponent	Pld	W	D	L	GF	GA	GD	Win %
Bahrain	4	0	2	2	1	5	−4	0.00
Bhutan	9	6	1	2	20	9	+11	66.67
China	1	0	0	1	0	1	−1	0.00
Guam	1	0	1	0	2	2	+0	0.00
Hong Kong	3	1	1	1	5	5	+0	33.33
India	15	3	7	5	13	26	−13	20.00
Iran	3	0	1	2	0	7	−7	0.00
Iraq	4	0	1	3	1	16	−15	0.00
Japan	2	0	0	2	0	4	−4	0.00
Jordan	1	0	1	0	1	1	+0	0.00
Kazakhstan	1	1	0	0	3	2	+1	100.00
Kuwait	2	1	0	1	1	2	−1	50.00
Laos	1	0	1	0	3	3	+0	0.00
Macau	1	1	0	0	3	2	+1	100.00
Malaysia	1	0	1	0	0	0	+0	0.00
Maldives	10	9	1	0	30	4	+26	90.00
Nepal	12	6	3	3	23	12	+11	50.00
North Korea	2	0	1	1	0	5	−5	0.00
Oman	2	1	0	1	2	1	+1	50.00
Pakistan	5	4	1	0	10	3	+7	80.00
Philippines	1	0	0	1	0	2	−2	0.00
Qatar	3	0	1	2	1	5	−4	0.00
Saudi Arabia	3	0	0	3	0	13	−13	0.00
Singapore	2	1	1	0	3	2	+1	50.00
South Korea	6	0	3	3	4	14	−10	0.00
Sri Lanka	7	6	1	0	15	1	+14	85.71
Syria	3	0	0	3	1	9	−8	0.00
Tajikistan	2	1	1	0	4	1	+3	50.00
Thailand	4	0	0	4	0	10	−10	0.00
Arab Emirates	1	0	0	1	1	6	−5	0.00
Uzbekistan	3	0	0	3	0	7	−7	0.00
Vietnam	2	0	0	2	1	5	−4	0.00
Yemen	1	1	0	0	1	0	+1	100.00
Total	118	42	30	46	149	185	−36	35.59

== Honours ==
2026 SAFF U-20 Championship winning team at a reception ceremony held at the National Sports Council in Dhaka.

=== Regional ===
- SAFF U-20/U-19/U-18 Championship
  - (gold) Champions (2): 2024, 2026
  - (silver) Runners-up (4): 2017, 2019, 2022, 2025

== See also ==
- Bangladesh national football team
- Bangladesh under-23 football team
- Bangladesh under-17 football team
- Bangladesh women's national football team
- Bangladesh women's under-20 football team
- Bangladesh women's under-17 football team
