= 2020 AFC U-16 Championship qualification =

Tournament details
- Host countries: Jordan (Group A); Uzbekistan (Group B); Iran (Group C); Saudi Arabia (Group D); Qatar (Group E); Kyrgyzstan (Group F); Indonesia (Group G); Vietnam (Group H); Singapore (Group I); Laos (Group J); Myanmar (Group K)
- Dates: 14–22 September 2019
- Teams: 47 (from 1 confederation)

Tournament statistics
- Matches played: 78
- Goals scored: 386 (4.95 per match)
- Attendance: 60,423 (775 per match)
- Top scorer: (Tajikistan) Abdulfatohi Khudoidodzoda (8 goals)

The 2020 AFC U-16 Championship qualification was an international men's under-16 football competition which decided the participating teams of the 2020 AFC U-16 Championship.

The AFC announced the cancellation of the final tournament due to the COVID-19 pandemic on 25 January 2021.

== Draw ==
All 47 AFC member associations teams entered the competition.

The draw was held on 9 May 2019 at the AFC House in Kuala Lumpur, Malaysia.

- West: 25 teams from West Asia, Central Asia and South Asia, were drawn into six groups: one group of five teams and five groups of four teams (Groups A–F).
- East: 22 teams from ASEAN and East Asia, were drawn into five groups: two groups of five teams and three groups of four teams (Groups G–K).

The teams were seeded in each zone according to their performance in the 2018 AFC U-16 Championship final tournament and qualification (overall ranking shown in parentheses; NR stands for non-ranked teams). The following restrictions were also applied:

- The eleven teams which indicated their intention to serve as qualification group hosts prior to the draw were drawn into separate groups.

	Pot 1	Pot 2	Pot 3	Pot 4	Pot 5
West Zone	1. **Tajikistan** (2); 2. **Oman** (7); 3. **India** (8); 4. **Iran** (9) **(H)**; 5. **Yemen** (10); 6. Iraq (12)	7. Jordan (14) **(H)**; 8. Afghanistan (16); 9. **Saudi Arabia** (17) **(H)**; 10. Bangladesh (18); 11. **Uzbekistan** (22) **(H)**; 12. Kyrgyzstan (24) **(H)**	13. **Qatar** (26) **(H)**; 14. Palestine (27); 15. Syria (29); 16. Nepal (32); 17. **Bahrain** (33) **(Q)**; 18. Lebanon (34)	19. Maldives (38); 20. Bhutan (40); 21. Sri Lanka (42)	22. Kuwait (NR); 23. Pakistan (NR); 24. Turkmenistan (NR); 25. **United Arab Emirates** (NR)
East Zone	1. **Japan** (1); 2. **South Korea** (3); 3. **Australia** (4); 4. **North Korea** (5); 5. **Indonesia** (6) **(H)**	6. Thailand (11); 7. Malaysia (13); 8. Vietnam (15) **(H)**; 9. **China** (19); 10. Hong Kong (20)	11. Brunei (21); 12. Myanmar (23) **(H)**; 13. Timor-Leste (25); 14. Cambodia (28); 15. Singapore (30) **(H)**	16. Chinese Taipei (31); 17. Laos (35) **(H)**; 18. Philippines (36); 19. Mongolia (37); 20. Guam (39)	21. Macau (41); 22. Northern Mariana Islands (43)

Notes

- Teams in **bold** qualified for the final tournament.
- (H): Qualification group hosts
- (Q): Final tournament hosts, automatically qualified regardless of qualification results

== Player eligibility ==
Players born on or after 1 January 2004 were eligible to compete in the tournament.

== Format ==
In each group, teams played each other once at a centralised venue. The eleven group winners and the four best runners-up qualified for the final tournament. The matches were played between 14 and 22 September 2019.

=== Tiebreakers ===
Teams were ranked according to points (3 points for a win, 1 point for a draw, 0 points for a loss), and if tied on points, the following tiebreaking criteria were applied, in the order given, to determine the rankings (Regulations Article 9.3):

1. Points in head-to-head matches among tied teams;
2. Goal difference in head-to-head matches among tied teams;
3. Goals scored in head-to-head matches among tied teams;
4. If more than two teams are tied, and after applying all head-to-head criteria above, a subset of teams are still tied, all head-to-head criteria above are reapplied exclusively to this subset of teams;
5. Goal difference in all group matches;
6. Goals scored in all group matches;
7. Penalty shoot-out if only two teams are tied and they met in the last round of the group;
8. Disciplinary points (yellow card = 1 point, red card as a result of two yellow cards = 3 points, direct red card = 3 points, yellow card followed by direct red card = 4 points);
9. Drawing of lots.

== Groups ==
=== Group A ===
- All matches were held in Jordan.
- Times listed are UTC+3.

Pos	Team	Pld	W	D	L	GF	GA	GD	Pts	Qualification
1	Tajikistan	4	4	0	0	29	2	+27	12	Final tournament
2	Jordan (H)	4	2	1	1	17	6	+11	7	
3	Kuwait	4	1	2	1	4	11	−7	5	
4	Nepal	4	1	1	2	4	15	−11	4	
5	Sri Lanka	4	0	0	4	0	20	−20	0	

Source: AFC
Rules for classification: Qualification tiebreakers
(H) Hosts
14 September 2019
17:00

Nepal	0–7	Jordan
	Report	Ayman 16'; Hajabi 19'; Habahbeh 20', 43', 47'; Obeidat 42'; Al-Ma'aitah 80'

Prince Mohammed Stadium, Zarqa
Attendance: 178
Referee: Kim Dae-yong (South Korea)
14 September 2019
20:00

Kuwait	2–0	Sri Lanka
Al-Sulili 9'; Yousef 15'	Report

Prince Mohammed Stadium, Zarqa
Attendance: 18
Referee: Nazmi Nasaruddin (Malaysia)

16 September 2019
17:00

Sri Lanka	0–8	Tajikistan
	Report	Saidaliev 17'; Toirov 22'; Khudoidodzoda 26', 34', 60', 68'; Salimshoev 40'; Akhtamov 88'

Prince Mohammed Stadium, Zarqa
Attendance: 11
Referee: Mahmood Al-Majarafi (Oman)
16 September 2019
20:00

Kuwait	1–1	Nepal
Al-Hindi 90+5' (pen.)	Report	Rai 74'

Prince Mohammed Stadium, Zarqa
Attendance: 37
Referee: Shaun Evans (Australia)

18 September 2019
17:00

Tajikistan	9–0	Kuwait
Al-Kandari 20' (o.g.); Salimshoev 42', 45+2'; Khudoidodzoda 45+4', 74'; Saidaliev 47'; Azizov 68'; Karimov 77' (pen.); Toirov 90+1'	Report

Prince Mohammed Stadium, Zarqa
Attendance: 19
Referee: Nazmi Nasaruddin (Malaysia)
18 September 2019
20:00

Jordan	7–0	Sri Lanka
Al-Taher 52'; Habahbeh 60', 67'; Obeidat 73'; Al-Ma'aitah 76', 86'; Al-Elaimat 90+3'	Report

Prince Mohammed Stadium, Zarqa
Attendance: 531
Referee: Thoriq Alkatiri (Indonesia)

20 September 2019
17:00

Jordan	1–1	Kuwait
Obeidat 28'	Report	Al-Sulili 19'

Prince Mohammed Stadium, Zarqa
Attendance: 972
Referee: Kim Dae-yong (South Korea)
20 September 2019
20:00

Nepal	0–7	Tajikistan
	Report	Saidaliev 7', 15', 29'; Khudoidodzoda 12'; Toirov 46'; Davlatzoda 71'; Shovaisudinov 83' (pen.)

Prince Mohammed Stadium, Zarqa
Attendance: 127
Referee: Mahmood Al-Majarafi (Oman)

22 September 2019
17:00

Sri Lanka	0–3	Nepal
	Report	M. Gurung 36'; Chaulagain 64'; Tamli 89'

Prince Mohammed Stadium, Zarqa
Attendance: 63
Referee: Thoriq Alkatiri (Indonesia)
22 September 2019
20:00

Tajikistan	5–2	Jordan
Rahmatzoda 24'; Khudoidodzoda 60'; Toirov 69'; Azizov 77'; Saidaliev 82'	Report	Al-Alem 11'; Habahbeh 13'

Prince Mohammed Stadium, Zarqa
Attendance: 1,123
Referee: Shaun Evans (Australia)

=== Group B ===
- All matches were held in Uzbekistan.
- Times listed are UTC+5.

Pos	Team	Pld	W	D	L	GF	GA	GD	Pts	Qualification
1	India	3	2	1	0	11	1	+10	7	Final tournament
2	Uzbekistan (H)	3	2	1	0	7	4	+3	7	Final tournament
3	Turkmenistan	3	1	0	2	4	9	−5	3	
4	Bahrain (Note: Bahrain, as final tournament hosts, automatically qualified regardless of qualification results.)	3	0	0	3	2	10	−8	0	Final tournament

Source: AFC
Rules for classification: Qualification tiebreakers
(H) Hosts
Notes:
18 September 2019
16:00

India	5–0	Turkmenistan
Paul 23'; Nongmeikapam 40', 90+1'; Loitongbam 55'; Jangra 90'	Report

Transportation Institute Stadium, Tashkent
Attendance: 55
Referee: Masoud Tufayelieh (Syria)
18 September 2019
16:00

Uzbekistan	3–1	Bahrain
Islamov 18'; Abdurazokov 69'; Turdimurodov 90'	Report	Mahmood 44'

JAR Stadium, Tashkent
Attendance: 550
Referee: Kim Woo-sung (South Korea)

20 September 2019
16:00

Turkmenistan	2–3	Uzbekistan
Goşaýew 41'; Mämiýew 90+1'	Report	Atabaýew 45+2' (o.g.); Islamov 72'; Turdimurodov 81'

JAR Stadium, Tashkent
Attendance: 320
Referee: Yudai Yamamoto (Japan)
20 September 2019
16:00

Bahrain	0–5	India
	Report	Nongmeikapam 4', 27'; M. Hasan 25' (o.g.); Paul 45+1', 73'

Transportation Institute Stadium, Tashkent
Attendance: 100
Referee: Clifford Daypuyat (Philippines)

22 September 2019
16:00

India	1–1	Uzbekistan
Nongmeikapam 68'	Report	Islamov 81'

JAR Stadium, Tashkent
Attendance: 1,100
Referee: Clifford Daypuyat (Philippines)
22 September 2019
16:00

Bahrain	1–2	Turkmenistan
Humood 11'	Report	Annamyradow 79' (pen.); Gurbandurdyýew 90+2'

Transportation Institute Stadium, Tashkent
Attendance: 35
Referee: Kim Woo-sung (South Korea)

=== Group C ===
- All matches were held in Iran.
- Times listed are UTC+4:30 on 18–20 September, UTC+3:30 on 22 September 2019.

Pos	Team	Pld	W	D	L	GF	GA	GD	Pts	Qualification
1	Iran (H)	3	3	0	0	18	1	+17	9	Final tournament
2	Palestine	3	2	0	1	8	3	+5	6	
3	Maldives	3	1	0	2	4	17	−13	3	
4	Afghanistan	3	0	0	3	0	9	−9	0	

Source: AFC
Rules for classification: Qualification tiebreakers
(H) Hosts
18 September 2019
16:45

Afghanistan	0–3 Awarded (Note: AFC awarded Palestine, Maldives and Iran a 3–0 win as a result of Afghanistan fielding two ineligible players. The original match results were Afghanistan 2–2 Palestine, Maldives 0–3 Afghanistan and Iran 4–0 Afghanistan.)	Palestine
Amiri 30', 70'	Report	Shadid 40', 69'

Hajibabaei Stadium, Hamadan
Attendance: 558
Referee: Timur Faizullin (Kyrgyzstan)
18 September 2019
19:45

Iran	13–0	Maldives
Ebrahimzadeh 6', 27', 46', 77', 86'; Rostami 11' (pen.), 48'; Danesh 26', 43'; Bahri 30', 40'; Kooshki 58', 72'	Report

Hajibabaei Stadium, Hamadan
Attendance: 1,221
Referee: Yusuke Araki (Japan)

20 September 2019
16:45

Maldives	3–0 Awarded	Afghanistan
	Report	Amin 52'; Bashiri 57'; Halim 84'

Hajibabaei Stadium, Hamadan
Attendance: 420
Referee: Khalid Al-Shaqsi (Oman)
20 September 2019
19:45

Palestine	1–2	Iran
Awayssa 26'	Report	Rostami 30' (pen.); Ebrahimzadeh 45'

Hajibabaei Stadium, Hamadan
Attendance: 1,630
Referee: Mongkolchai Pechsri (Thailand)

22 September 2019
15:45

Palestine	4–1	Maldives
Al-Sharbati 56'; Khdirat 66'; Awayssa 88'; Attal 90+2'	Report	Hamdoon 50'

Hajibabaei Stadium, Hamadan
Attendance: 144
Referee: Mongkolchai Pechsri (Thailand)
22 September 2019
18:45

Iran	3–0 Awarded	Afghanistan
Kooshki 17', 76'; Rostami 45+2' (pen.), 59'	Report

Hajibabaei Stadium, Hamadan
Attendance: 1,352
Referee: Yusuke Araki (Japan)

=== Group D ===
- All matches were held in Saudi Arabia.
- Times listed are UTC+3.

Pos	Team	Pld	W	D	L	GF	GA	GD	Pts	Qualification
1	Saudi Arabia (H)	3	2	1	0	8	3	+5	7	Final tournament
2	Oman	3	2	1	0	3	0	+3	7	Final tournament
3	Pakistan	3	0	1	2	3	7	−4	1	
4	Syria	3	0	1	2	2	6	−4	1	

Source: AFC
Rules for classification: Qualification tiebreakers
(H) Hosts
18 September 2019
18:25

Oman	2–0	Pakistan
M. Al-Hasani 18'; Al-Araimi 61'	Report

Prince Saud bin Jalawi Stadium, Khobar
Attendance: 99
Referee: Yu Ming-hsun (Chinese Taipei)
18 September 2019
21:20

Saudi Arabia	4–1	Syria
Zaid 8'; Al-Zaid 17'; Barrah 39', 83'	Report	Kassem 45+1'

Prince Saud bin Jalawi Stadium, Khobar
Attendance: 120
Referee: Çarymyrat Kurbanow (Turkmenistan)

20 September 2019
18:25

Syria	0–1	Oman
	Report	Al-Jabri 90'

Prince Saud bin Jalawi Stadium, Khobar
Attendance: 98
Referee: Chae Sang-hyeop (South Korea)
20 September 2019
21:20

Pakistan	2–4	Saudi Arabia
M. Khan 63'; Ahmed 72'	Report	Hibah 14'; Al-Elewai 15', 67'; Barrah 38'

Prince Saud bin Jalawi Stadium, Khobar
Attendance: 98
Referee: Sadullo Gulmurodi (Tajikistan)

22 September 2019
18:25

Syria	1–1	Pakistan
Jabra 90'	Report	Ahmed 64'

Prince Saud bin Jalawi Stadium, Khobar
Attendance: 69
Referee: Çarymyrat Kurbanow (Turkmenistan)
22 September 2019
21:20

Oman	0–0	Saudi Arabia
	Report

Prince Saud bin Jalawi Stadium, Khobar
Attendance: 100
Referee: Yu Ming-hsun (Chinese Taipei)

=== Group E ===
- All matches were held in Qatar.
- Times listed are UTC+3.

Pos	Team	Pld	W	D	L	GF	GA	GD	Pts	Qualification
1	Qatar (H)	3	2	1	0	14	1	+13	7	Final tournament
2	Yemen	3	2	1	0	14	2	+12	7	Final tournament
3	Bangladesh	3	1	0	2	3	5	−2	3	
4	Bhutan	3	0	0	3	1	24	−23	0	

Source: AFC
Rules for classification: Qualification tiebreakers
(H) Hosts
18 September 2019
16:00

Yemen	10–1	Bhutan
Balabl 12' (pen.); Murshed 16', 76'; Hasan 20', 43'; Mahdi 51', 52', 80', 84'; Al-Tairi 74'	Report	Namgyel 42'

Aspire Dome, Doha
Attendance: 150
Referee: Zhang Lei (China)
18 September 2019
19:00

Bangladesh	0–2	Qatar
	Report	Al-Abdulla 55'; Al-Dosari 90'

Aspire Dome, Doha
Attendance: 605
Referee: Nasrullo Kabirov (Tajikistan)

20 September 2019
16:00

Bhutan	0–3	Bangladesh
	Report	Saeed 45'; Jigme 50' (o.g.); Moinul 52'

Aspire Dome, Doha
Attendance: 455
Referee: Takuto Okabe (Japan)
20 September 2019
19:00

Qatar	1–1	Yemen
Al-Quraishi 58' (pen.)	Report	Al-Kawmani 77'

Aspire Dome, Doha
Attendance: 3,000
Referee: Payam Heidari (Iran)

22 September 2019
16:00

Yemen	3–0	Bangladesh
Hasan 64'; Mahroos 73', 78'	Report

Aspire Dome, Doha
Attendance: 2,100
Referee: Takuto Okabe (Japan)
22 September 2019
19:00

Qatar	11–0	Bhutan
Al-Abdulla 8', 65', 68'; Hamza 36' (pen.), 88' (pen.); Al-Quraishi 44' (pen.), 57'; Al-Naimi 49'; Al-Mejaba 53'; Al-Ghareeb 73'; Al-Dosari 90+3'	Report

Aspire Dome, Doha
Attendance: 500
Referee: Zhang Lei (China)

=== Group F ===
- All matches were held in Kyrgyzstan.
- Times listed are UTC+6.

Pos	Team	Pld	W	D	L	GF	GA	GD	Pts	Qualification
1	United Arab Emirates	3	3	0	0	7	2	+5	9	Final tournament
2	Iraq	3	2	0	1	5	2	+3	6	
3	Kyrgyzstan (H)	3	1	0	2	4	7	−3	3	
4	Lebanon	3	0	0	3	4	9	−5	0	

Source: AFC
Rules for classification: Qualification tiebreakers
(H) Hosts
18 September 2019
15:30

Iraq	0–1	United Arab Emirates
	Report	Adil 39'

Dolen Omurzakov Stadium, Bishkek
Attendance: 50
Referee: Rowan Arumughan (India)
18 September 2019
20:00

Kyrgyzstan	3–2	Lebanon
Almazbekov 62'; Abylkasymov 72', 85'	Report	Khalaf 10'; Nassereddine 21'

Dolen Omurzakov Stadium, Bishkek
Attendance: 1,200
Referee: Chen Hsin-chuan (Chinese Taipei)

20 September 2019
15:30

Lebanon	1–2	Iraq
Zbib 84'	Report	Al-Ameer 64'; Jameel 78'

Dolen Omurzakov Stadium, Bishkek
Attendance: 45
Referee: Pranjal Banerjee (India)
20 September 2019
20:00

United Arab Emirates	2–1	Kyrgyzstan
Adil 7'; Ibrahim 13'	Report	Almazbekov 87' (pen.)

Dolen Omurzakov Stadium, Bishkek
Attendance: 2,000
Referee: Choe Kwang-hyon (North Korea)

22 September 2019
15:30

Lebanon	1–4	United Arab Emirates
Zbib 63' (pen.)	Report	Adil 16' (pen.); Al-Harthi 26', 60'; Abdulrahim 32'

Dolen Omurzakov Stadium, Bishkek
Attendance: 50
Referee: Rowan Arumughan (India)
22 September 2019
20:00

Iraq	3–0	Kyrgyzstan
Hasan 40'; Jameel 45+2'; Al-Akbar 90' (pen.)	Report

Dolen Omurzakov Stadium, Bishkek
Attendance: 2,500
Referee: Chen Hsin-chuan (Chinese Taipei)

=== Group G ===
- All matches were held in Indonesia.
- Times listed are UTC+7.

Pos	Team	Pld	W	D	L	GF	GA	GD	Pts	Qualification
1	China	4	3	1	0	28	0	+28	10	Final tournament
2	Indonesia (H)	4	3	1	0	27	1	+26	10	Final tournament
3	Philippines	4	2	0	2	10	12	−2	6	
4	Brunei	4	1	0	3	7	19	−12	3	
5	Northern Mariana Islands	4	0	0	4	2	42	−40	0	

Source: AFC
Rules for classification: Qualification tiebreakers
(H) Hosts
14 September 2019
15:30

Brunei	0–7	China
	Report	Fan Chao 3', 22'; He Xiaoke 57', 60', 89'; Gao Jingchun 75'; Zeng Yaozhang 90+4'

Madya Stadium, Jakarta
Attendance: 28
Referee: Sherzod Kasimov (Uzbekistan)
14 September 2019
19:00

Northern Mariana Islands	0–7	Philippines
	Report	Saludo 3'; Jalique 33', 42', 51'; Pahud 69'; Palacio 81'; Del Campo 90+2'

Madya Stadium, Jakarta
Attendance: 39
Referee: Feras Taweel (Syria)

16 September 2019
15:30

Northern Mariana Islands	1–5	Brunei
Goto 87'	Report	Danisyh 49'; Idzzaham 60', 73', 90+2'; Syaherrul 84'

Madya Stadium, Jakarta
Attendance: 21
Referee: Bijan Heidari (Iran)
16 September 2019
19:00

Philippines	0–4	Indonesia
	Report	Athallah 37'; Marselino 46'; Lestaluhu 52'; Wahyu D. 78'

Madya Stadium, Jakarta
Attendance: 3,740
Referee: Abdulla Al-Marri (Qatar)

18 September 2019
15:30

China	6–0	Philippines
Fan Chao 14', 57'; Mijit 22' (pen.), 58'; He Xiaoke 47', 52'	Report

Madya Stadium, Jakarta
Attendance: 60
Referee: Mohammad Arafah (Jordan)
18 September 2019
19:00

Indonesia	15–1	Northern Mariana Islands
Marselino 8', 51', 53', 63', 90'; Daffa 15'; Athallah 16', 18', 26', 42'; Ruy 57', 73'; Wahyu P. 59', 78'; Mikhael 87'	Report	Maniago 45+1'

Madya Stadium, Jakarta
Attendance: 711
Referee: Feras Taweel (Syria)

20 September 2019
15:30

China	15–0	Northern Mariana Islands
Zeng Yaozhang 4', 6', 29', 46'; Cui Xinglong 17', 41', 51'; Huang Peizhao 36', 66', 68', 82'; Chen Diya 45' (pen.); Gao Jingchun 62'; Mijit 81' (pen.), 89'	Report

Madya Stadium, Jakarta
Attendance: 39
Referee: Bijan Heidari (Iran)
20 September 2019
19:00

Brunei	0–8	Indonesia
	Report	Athallah 15' (pen.); Daffa 43', 88'; Marselino 47' (pen.); Faizal 61', 69'; Ruy 63', 83'

Madya Stadium, Jakarta
Attendance: 1,060
Referee: Abdulla Al-Marri (Qatar)

22 September 2019
15:30

Philippines	3–2	Brunei
Pahud 55'; Abelarde 58'; Dalapo 84'	Report	Wafiq 16'; Syaherrul 73'

Gelora Bung Karno Stadium, Jakarta
Attendance: 517
Referee: Mohammad Arafah (Jordan)
22 September 2019
19:00

Indonesia	0–0	China
	Report

Gelora Bung Karno Stadium, Jakarta
Attendance: 13,026
Referee: Sherzod Kasimov (Uzbekistan)

=== Group H ===
- All matches were held in Vietnam.
- Times listed are UTC+7.

Pos	Team	Pld	W	D	L	GF	GA	GD	Pts	Qualification
1	Australia	4	4	0	0	8	2	+6	12	Final tournament
2	Vietnam (H)	4	3	0	1	16	2	+14	9	
3	Timor-Leste	4	2	0	2	11	4	+7	6	
4	Mongolia	4	1	0	3	2	14	−12	3	
5	Macau	4	0	0	4	1	16	−15	0	

Source: AFC
Rules for classification: Qualification tiebreakers
(H) Hosts
14 September 2019
16:00

Macau	0–1	Mongolia
	Report	Jargalsaikhan 70'

Vietnam YFTC Field no. 1, Hanoi
Attendance: 10
Referee: Zaid Thamer (Iraq)
14 September 2019
18:00

Timor-Leste	0–2	Vietnam
	Report	Nguyễn Văn Dương 5'; Phạm Văn Phong 28'

Vietnam YFTC Field no. 3, Hanoi
Attendance: 325
Referee: Ahmad Al-Ali (Kuwait)

16 September 2019
16:00

Macau	1–6	Timor-Leste
Cristevão 55' (o.g.)	Report	Bahkito 8', 48'; Willian 39'; Fernando 80'; Guilherme 82'; Zenivio 89'

Vietnam YFTC Field no. 1, Hanoi
Attendance: 41
Referee: Qasim Al-Hatmi (Oman)
16 September 2019
18:00

Mongolia	1–2	Australia
Damdindorj 65'	Report	Delgernasan 3' (o.g.); Batsukh 15' (o.g.)

Vietnam YFTC Field no. 3, Hanoi
Attendance: 105
Referee: Ali Reda (Lebanon)

18 September 2019
16:00

Australia	3–0	Macau
Nguyen 9', 44'; Leong Chon Kit 27' (o.g.)	Report

Vietnam YFTC Field no. 1, Hanoi
Attendance: 30
Referee: Ammar Mahfoodh (Bahrain)
18 September 2019
18:00

Vietnam	7–0	Mongolia
Đỗ Văn Chí 5' (pen.); Gankhuyag 17' (o.g.); Võ Anh Quân 24'; Nguyễn Công Sơn 40'; Cái Văn Quỳ 74'; Vũ Đặng Minh Tú 75'; Đàm Đức Vinh 80'	Report

Vietnam YFTC Field no. 3, Hanoi
Attendance: 208
Referee: Qasim Al-Hatmi (Oman)

20 September 2019
16:00

Timor-Leste	0–1	Australia
	Report	Rawlins 45+1'

Vietnam YFTC Field no. 1, Hanoi
Attendance: 92
Referee: Ahmad Al-Ali (Kuwait)
20 September 2019
18:00

Vietnam	6–0	Macau
Sou Hin Nang 28' (o.g.); Vũ Đặng Minh Tú 48'; Lei Cheng Lam 52' (o.g.); Phan Duy Hào 53', 64'; Đàm Đức Vinh 87'	Report

Vietnam YFTC Field no. 3, Hanoi
Attendance: 52
Referee: Ali Reda (Lebanon)

22 September 2019
16:00

Mongolia	0–5	Timor-Leste
	Report	Kefi 5', 13'; Bahkito 68', 75', 82'

Vietnam YFTC Field no. 1, Hanoi
Attendance: 30
Referee: Ammar Mahfoodh (Bahrain)
22 September 2019
18:00

Australia	2–1	Vietnam
Oliveira 58'; Smyth 89'	Report	Nguyễn Công Sơn 19'

Vietnam YFTC Field no. 3, Hanoi
Attendance: 683
Referee: Zaid Thamer (Iraq)

=== Group I ===
- All matches were held in Singapore.
- Times listed are UTC+8.

Pos	Team	Pld	W	D	L	GF	GA	GD	Pts	Qualification
1	North Korea	3	3	0	0	26	1	+25	9	Final tournament
2	Hong Kong	3	2	0	1	6	6	0	6	
3	Singapore (H)	3	1	0	2	12	9	+3	3	
4	Guam	3	0	0	3	2	30	−28	0	

Source: AFC
Rules for classification: Qualification tiebreakers
(H) Hosts
17 September 2019
17:00

North Korea	16–0	Guam
Yom Chol-gyong 7', 57'; Choe Song-jin 12', 33', 35' (pen.), 44'; Ri Il-song 15', 39', 42' (pen.); Ri Kum-chol 37', 52', 55', 66', 89'; Kim Kwang-ryong 65'; Ryu Kwon-ung 72'	Report

Jalan Besar Stadium, Kallang
Attendance: 56
Referee: Baraa Aisha (Palestine)
17 September 2019
20:00

Hong Kong	2–1	Singapore
Lee Tsz Hin 35'; Lee Lok Him 90+1' (pen.)	Report	Khairin 9'

Jalan Besar Stadium, Kallang
Attendance: 528
Referee: Khalid Al-Turais (Saudi Arabia)

19 September 2019
17:00

Guam	1–4	Hong Kong
Benavente 75'	Report	Yim Kai Cheuk 5', 39'; Slattery 52'; Lee Tsz Hin 86'

Jalan Besar Stadium, Kallang
Attendance: 171
Referee: C. R. Srikrishna (India)
19 September 2019
20:00

Singapore	1–6	North Korea
Khairin 43'	Report	Ri Il-song 22'; Choe Song-jin 27', 63'; Yom Chol-gyong 38'; Choe Ryong-il 51'; Ri Kum-chol 73'

Jalan Besar Stadium, Kallang
Attendance: 721
Referee: Dmitriy Mashentsev (Kyrgyzstan)

21 September 2019
17:00

North Korea	4–0	Hong Kong
Choe Song-jin 31' (pen.); Ri Il-song 36'; Mun Jong-chong 39', 61'	Report

Jalan Besar Stadium, Kallang
Attendance: 124
Referee: Khalid Al-Turais (Saudi Arabia)
21 September 2019
20:00

Singapore	10–1	Guam
Pinto 7' (pen.); Ali 16'; Seng Hong Kai 22', 33'; Arsyad 25', 53', 65'; Austin 39'; Irfan 47'; Nasrul 90+3' (pen.)	Report	Stenson 18'

Jalan Besar Stadium, Kallang
Attendance: 578
Referee: Baraa Aisha (Palestine)

=== Group J ===
- All matches were held in Laos.
- Times listed are UTC+7.

Pos	Team	Pld	W	D	L	GF	GA	GD	Pts	Qualification
1	Japan	3	2	1	0	14	2	+12	7	Final tournament
2	Laos (H)	3	2	0	1	2	4	−2	6	
3	Malaysia	3	1	1	1	9	3	+6	4	
4	Cambodia	3	0	0	3	0	16	−16	0	

Source: AFC
Rules for classification: Qualification tiebreakers
(H) Hosts
18 September 2019
15:00

Japan	4–0	Laos
H. Suzuki 25', 75'; Narahara 26'; Yamazaki 63'	Report

National Stadium, Vientiane
Attendance: 2,362
Referee: Mohammed Al-Hoish (Saudi Arabia)
18 September 2019
18:30

Malaysia	7–0	Cambodia
Adam U. 7' (pen.); Adam F. 16'; Akid 22', 30'; Harry 52'; Nabil 65'; Khairil 90'	Report

National Stadium, Vientiane
Attendance: 189
Referee: Tejas Nagvenkar (India)

20 September 2019
15:00

Cambodia	0–8	Japan
	Report	Morimoto 3', 10', 88'; Osaka 15', 59'; Kitano 49', 62'; Naito 57'

National Stadium, Vientiane
Attendance: 120
Referee: Ismaeel Habib Ali (Bahrain)
20 September 2019
18:30

Laos	1–0	Malaysia
Somthongkham 4'	Report

National Stadium, Vientiane
Attendance: 2,000
Referee: Shukri Al-Hunfush (Saudi Arabia)

22 September 2019
15:00

Japan	2–2	Malaysia
Osako 63' (pen.); Naito 90+4'	Report	Daniel 73' (pen.), 82'

National Stadium, Vientiane
Attendance: 721
Referee: Shukri Al-Hunfush (Saudi Arabia)
22 September 2019
18:30

Cambodia	0–1	Laos
	Report	Siphongphan 25'

National Stadium, Vientiane
Attendance: 5,283
Referee: Ismaeel Habib Ali (Bahrain)

=== Group K ===
- All matches were held in Myanmar.
- Times listed are UTC+6:30.

Pos	Team	Pld	W	D	L	GF	GA	GD	Pts	Qualification
1	South Korea	3	3	0	0	13	0	+13	9	Final tournament
2	Thailand	3	2	0	1	10	2	+8	6	
3	Chinese Taipei	3	1	0	2	2	16	−14	3	
4	Myanmar (H)	3	0	0	3	0	7	−7	0	

Source: AFC
Rules for classification: Qualification tiebreakers
(H) Hosts
18 September 2019
15:00

South Korea	10–0	Chinese Taipei
Lee Kyu-dong 19', 20', 47'; Lee Dong-hyeon 45+1'; Kim Ji-soo 54'; Her Dong-min 70'; Chang Ha-min 81', 90+2'; Kim Do-hyun 88'; Kim Jin-yeop 90+1'	Report

Thuwunna Stadium, Yangon
Attendance: 150
Referee: Hussein Abo Yehia (Lebanon)
18 September 2019
18:00

Thailand	4–0	Myanmar
Niphitphon 7', 12'; Kakana 28'; Theekawin 63'	Report

Thuwunna Stadium, Yangon
Attendance: 1,256
Referee: Saoud Al-Athbah (Qatar)

20 September 2019
15:00

Chinese Taipei	0–6	Thailand
	Report	Kongpop 22'; Thanawat 30'; Niphitphon 47', 49', 59', 90'

Thuwunna Stadium, Yangon
Attendance: 200
Referee: Ali Shaban (Kuwait)
20 September 2019
18:00

Myanmar	0–1	South Korea
	Report	Chang Ha-min 51' (pen.)

Thuwunna Stadium, Yangon
Attendance: 453
Referee: Vahid Kazemi (Iran)

22 September 2019
15:00

South Korea	2–0	Thailand
Chang Ha-min 12'; Lee Kyu-dong 35'	Report

Thuwunna Stadium, Yangon
Attendance: 368
Referee: Hussein Abo Yehia (Lebanon)
22 September 2019
18:00

Myanmar	0–2	Chinese Taipei
	Report	Huang Yung-chun 48'; Luo Zih-an 85'

Thuwunna Stadium, Yangon
Attendance: 523
Referee: Saoud Al-Athbah (Qatar)

== Ranking of second-placed teams ==
Due to groups having different number of teams, the results against the fifth-placed teams in five-team groups were not considered for this ranking.

Pos	Grp	Team	Pld	W	D	L	GF	GA	GD	Pts	Qualification
1	E	Yemen	3	2	1	0	14	2	+12	7	Final tournament
2	G	Indonesia	3	2	1	0	12	0	+12	7	Final tournament
3	B	Uzbekistan	3	2	1	0	7	4	+3	7	Final tournament
4	D	Oman	3	2	1	0	3	0	+3	7	Final tournament
5	H	Vietnam	3	2	0	1	10	2	+8	6 (Note: Disciplinary points: Vietnam −4, Thailand −6.)	
6	K	Thailand	3	2	0	1	10	2	+8	6	
7	C	Palestine	3	2	0	1	8	3	+5	6	
8	F	Iraq	3	2	0	1	5	2	+3	6	
9	I	Hong Kong	3	2	0	1	6	6	0	6	
10	J	Laos	3	2	0	1	2	4	−2	6	
11	A	Jordan	3	1	1	1	10	6	+4	4	

Source: AFC
Rules for classification: 1) points; 2) goal difference; 3) goals scored; 4) disciplinary points; 5) drawing of lots.

== Qualified teams ==
The following 16 teams qualified for the final tournament.

Team	Qualified as	Qualified on	Previous appearances in AFC U-16 Championship^{1}
Bahrain	Hosts	17 September 2019	7 (1986, 1988, 1992, 1994, 1996, 1998, 2008)
Tajikistan	Group A winners	22 September 2019	3 (2006, 2010, 2018)
India	Group B winners	22 September 2019	8 (1990, 1996, 2002, 2004, 2008, 2012, 2016, 2018)
Iran	Group C winners	22 September 2019	11 (1996, 1998, 2000, 2004, 2006, **2008**, 2010, 2012, 2014, 2016, 2018)
Saudi Arabia	Group D winners	22 September 2019	10 (**1985**, 1986, **1988**, 1992, 1994, 2006, 2008, 2012, 2014, 2016)
Qatar	Group E winners	22 September 2019	10 (1985, 1986, 1988, **1990**, 1992, 1994, 1998, 2002, 2004, 2014)
United Arab Emirates	Group F winners	20 September 2019	7 (1990, 1992, 1994, 2002, 2008, 2010, 2016)
China	Group G winners	22 September 2019	14 (1985, 1988, 1990, **1992**, 1994, 1996, 2000, 2002, **2004**, 2006, 2008, 2010, 2012, 2014)
Australia	Group H winners	22 September 2019	6 (2008, 2010, 2012, 2014, 2016, 2018)
North Korea	Group I winners	21 September 2019	11 (1986, 1988, 1992, 1998, 2004, 2006, **2010**, 2012, **2014**, 2016, 2018)
Japan	Group J winners	22 September 2019	15 (1985, 1988, **1994**, 1996, 1998, 2000, 2002, 2004, **2006**, 2008, 2010, 2012, 2014, 2016, **2018**)
South Korea	Group K winners	22 September 2019	14 (**1986**, 1988, 1990, 1994, 1996, 1998, **2002**, 2004, 2006, 2008, 2012, 2014, 2016, 2018)
Yemen	1st best runners-up	22 September 2019	5 (2002, 2006, 2012, 2016, 2018)
Indonesia	2nd best runners-up	22 September 2019	6 (1986, 1988, 1990, 2008, 2010, 2018)
Uzbekistan	3rd best runners-up	22 September 2019	9 (1994, 1996, 2002, 2004, 2008, 2010, **2012**, 2014, 2016)
Oman	4th best runners-up	22 September 2019	10 (1994, **1996**, 1998, **2000**, 2004, 2010, 2012, 2014, 2016, 2018)

^{1} Bold indicates champions for that year. Italic indicates hosts for that year.

== Goalscorers ==
There were 386 goals scored in 78 matches, for an average of 4.95 goals per match.

8 goals

- (Tajikistan) Abdulfatohi Khudoidodzoda

7 goals

- (Indonesia) Marselino Ferdinan
- (North Korea) Choe Song-jin

6 goals

- (Indonesia) Athallah Araihan
- (Iran) Amir Ebrahimzadeh
- (Jordan) Abdelqader Al-Alem
- (North Korea) Ri Kum-chol
- (Tajikistan) Muhammadvoris Saidaliev
- (Thailand) Niphitphon Wongpanya

5 goals

- (China) He Xiaoke
- (China) Zeng Yaozhang
- (India) Sridarth Nongmeikapam
- (Iran) Yadegar Rostami
- (North Korea) Ri Il-song
- (Timor-Leste) Alexandro Bahkito

4 goals

- (China) Fan Chao
- (China) Huang Peizhao
- (China) Mewlan Mijit
- (Indonesia) Ruy Arianto
- (Iran) Reza Kooshki
- (Qatar) Rashid Al-Abdulla
- (South Korea) Chang Ha-min
- (South Korea) Lee Kyu-dong
- (Tajikistan) Khusrav Toirov
- (Yemen) Mohammed Mahdi

3 goals

- (Brunei) Idzzaham Aleshahmezan
- (China) Cui Xinglong
- (India) Shubho Paul
- (Indonesia) Aditiya Daffa
- (Japan) Sorato Morimoto
- (Jordan) Saraj Al-Ma'aitah
- (Jordan) Mohammad Obeidat
- (North Korea) Yom Chol-gyong
- (Philippines) John Lloyd Jalique
- (Qatar) Mohammed Al-Quraishi
- (Saudi Arabia) Muhannad Barrah
- (Singapore) Arsyad Basiron
- (Tajikistan) Kabir Salimshoev
- (United Arab Emirates) Sultan Adil
- (Uzbekistan) Rian Islamov
- (Yemen) Mohammed Ali Hasan

2 goals

- (Afghanistan) Mujtaba Amiri
- (Australia) Nathan Nguyen
- (Brunei) Syaherrul Affendy
- (China) Gao Jingchun
- (Hong Kong) Lee Tsz Hin
- (Hong Kong) Yim Kai Cheuk
- (Indonesia) Wahyu Pratama
- (Indonesia) Faizal Shaifullah
- (Iran) Fardin Bahri
- (Iran) Iman Danesh
- (Iraq) Mohammed Jameel
- (Japan) Sota Kitano
- (Japan) Yamato Naito
- (Japan) Sina Osaka
- (Japan) Hiroto Suzuki
- (Kuwait) Thamer Al-Sulili
- (Kyrgyzstan) Aalambek Abylkasymov
- (Kyrgyzstan) Beknaz Almazbekov
- (Lebanon) Mahmoud Zbib
- (Malaysia) Daniel Edzuan
- (Malaysia) Akid Zamri
- (North Korea) Mun Jong-chong
- (Pakistan) Moin Ahmed
- (Palestine) Bahaa Awayssa
- (Palestine) Ahmed Shadid
- (Philippines) David Pahud
- (Qatar) Abdulrahman Al-Dosari
- (Qatar) Mobarak Hamza
- (Singapore) Khairin Nadim
- (Singapore) Seng Hong Kai
- (Saudi Arabia) Abdulaziz Al-Elewai
- (Tajikistan) Sunatullo Azizov
- (Timor-Leste) Alexandro Kefi
- (United Arab Emirates) Mohamed Al-Harthi
- (Uzbekistan) Rustam Turdimurodov
- (Vietnam) Đàm Đức Vinh
- (Vietnam) Nguyễn Công Sơn
- (Vietnam) Phan Duy Hào
- (Vietnam) Vũ Đặng Minh Tú
- (Yemen) Hamzah Mahroos
- (Yemen) Ahmed Murshed

1 goal

- (Afghanistan) Hamayoun Amin
- (Afghanistan) Jan Bashiri
- (Afghanistan) Wahid Halim
- (Australia) Bernardo Oliveira
- (Australia) Joshua Rawlins
- (Australia) Luka Smyth
- (Bahrain) Ali Humood
- (Bahrain) Sayed Mahmood
- (Bangladesh) Moinul Islam Moin
- (Bangladesh) Saiful Islam Saeed
- (Bhutan) Jigme Namgyel
- (Brunei) Wafiq Danish
- (Brunei) Danisyh Syariee
- (China) Chen Diya
- (Chinese Taipei) Huang Yung-chun
- (Chinese Taipei) Luo Zih-an
- (Guam) Joshua Benavente
- (Guam) Andrew Stenson
- (Hong Kong) Lee Lok Him
- (Hong Kong) Matthew Slattery
- (India) Himanshu Jangra
- (India) Taison Singh Loitongbam
- (Indonesia) Wahyu Drajat
- (Indonesia) Alfin Lestaluhu
- (Indonesia) Mikhael Tata
- (Iraq) Ali Al-Akbar
- (Iraq) Karar Al-Ameer
- (Iraq) Mustafa Hasan
- (Japan) Yoshiki Narahara
- (Japan) Rui Osako
- (Japan) Taishin Yamazaki
- (Jordan) Mo'ath Al-Elaimat
- (Jordan) Adham Al-Reda'i
- (Jordan) Saif Al-Taher
- (Jordan) Ahmad Ayman
- (Jordan) Ali Hajabi
- (Kuwait) Abdulwahab Al-Hindi
- (Kuwait) Sayed Yousef
- (Laos) Anantaza Siphongphan
- (Laos) Lavi Somthongkham
- (Lebanon) Ibrahim Khalaf
- (Lebanon) Rayan Nassereddine
- (Malaysia) Harry Danish
- (Malaysia) Adam Farhan
- (Malaysia) Adam Uwais
- (Malaysia) Nabil Qayyum
- (Malaysia) Khairil Zain
- (Maldives) Aiham Hamdoon
- (Mongolia) Shiiravjamts Damdindorj
- (Mongolia) Munkhbolor Jargalsaikhan
- (Nepal) Anil Chaulagain
- (Nepal) Mohit Gurung
- (Nepal) Dipesh Rai
- (Nepal) Jaan Tamli
- (North Korea) Choe Ryong-il
- (North Korea) Kim Kwang-ryong
- (North Korea) Ryu Kwon-ung
- (Northern Mariana Islands) Kohtaro Goto
- (Northern Mariana Islands) Jim Maniago
- (Oman) Mamoon Al-Araimi
- (Oman) Mshary Al-Hasani
- (Oman) Abdulrahman Al-Jabri
- (Pakistan) Muhammad Amir Khan
- (Palestine) Malik Al-Sharbati
- (Palestine) Fouad Attal
- (Palestine) Almothana Khdirat
- (Philippines) Umi Abelarde
- (Philippines) Uriel Dalapo
- (Philippines) Simon del Campo
- (Philippines) Benjamin Palacio
- (Philippines) Vincent Saludo
- (Qatar) Hassan Al-Ghareeb
- (Qatar) Mahdi Al-Mejaba
- (Qatar) Abdulaziz Al-Naimi
- (Saudi Arabia) Suhayb Al-Zaid
- (Saudi Arabia) Walid Hibah
- (Saudi Arabia) Abdullah Zaid
- (Singapore) Kenji Austin
- (Singapore) Nasrul Haji
- (Singapore) Irfan Iskandar
- (Singapore) Ali Manaf
- (Singapore) Ethan Pinto
- (South Korea) Her Dong-min
- (South Korea) Kim Do-hyun
- (South Korea) Kim Ji-soo
- (South Korea) Kim Jin-yeop
- (South Korea) Lee Dong-hyeon
- (Syria) Omar Jabra
- (Syria) Anis Kassem
- (Tajikistan) Fakhriddin Akhtamov
- (Tajikistan) Khurshed Davlatzoda
- (Tajikistan) Mehrubon Karimov
- (Tajikistan) Rahmatshoh Rahmatzoda
- (Tajikistan) Mujovid Shovaisudinov
- (Thailand) Theekawin Chansri
- (Thailand) Kakana Khamyok
- (Thailand) Thanawat Saipetch
- (Thailand) Kongpop Sroirak
- (Timor-Leste) Fernando
- (Timor-Leste) Matias Guilherme
- (Timor-Leste) Zenivio
- (Timor-Leste) Willian
- (Turkmenistan) Abdyrahman Annamyradow
- (Turkmenistan) Yslamgeldi Goşaýew
- (Turkmenistan) Meýlis Gurbandurdyýew
- (Turkmenistan) Begenç Mämiýew
- (United Arab Emirates) Mansoor Abdulrahim
- (United Arab Emirates) Yousif Ibrahim
- (Uzbekistan) Mirkomil Abdurazokov
- (Vietnam) Cái Văn Quỳ
- (Vietnam) Đỗ Văn Chí
- (Vietnam) Nguyễn Văn Dương
- (Vietnam) Phạm Văn Phong
- (Vietnam) Võ Anh Quân
- (Yemen) Hasan Al-Kawmani
- (Yemen) Omar Al-Tairi
- (Yemen) Hesham Balabl

1 own goal

- (Bahrain) Mohamed Hasan (against India)
- (Bhutan) Kelzang Jigme (against Bangladesh)
- (Kuwait) Ahmad Al-Kandari (against Tajikistan)
- (Macau) Lei Cheng Lam (against Vietnam)
- (Macau) Leong Chon Kit (against Australia)
- (Macau) Sou Hin Nang (against Vietnam)
- (Mongolia) Tuguldur Batsukh (against Australia)
- (Mongolia) Altanshagai Delgernasan (against Australia)
- (Mongolia) Ulziisaikhan Gankhuyag (against Vietnam)
- (Timor-Leste) Cristevão (against Macau)
- (Turkmenistan) Rahymberdi Atabaýew (against Uzbekistan)
