= 2025 CAFA U-17 Championship =

CAFA U-17 Championship 2025
Чемпионат CAFA-2025 среди юношеских сборных (U-17)

Tournament details
- Host country: Uzbekistan
- City: Tashkent
- Dates: 24–31 May
- Teams: 6 (from 1 sub-confederation)
- Venue: 1 (in 1 host city)

Final positions
- Champions: Tajikistan (2nd title)
- Runners-up: Uzbekistan
- Third place: Turkmenistan
- Fourth place: Kyrgyz Republic

Tournament statistics
- Matches played: 9
- Goals scored: 39 (4.33 per match)
- Top scorer(s): (Iran) Abbas Rafie (4 goals)
- Best player: (Tajikistan) Mehrubon Odilzoda
- Best goalkeeper: (Tajikistan) Abubakr Rahmonqulov
- Fair play award: Afghanistan

The 2025 CAFA U-17 Championship was the third edition of the CAFA U-17 Championship, the international youth football championship organized by Central Asian Football Association for the men's under-17 national teams of Central Asia. The tournament took place from 24 to 31 May 2025 in Tashkent, Uzbekistan. All six CAFA member associations participated in the tournament, with players born on or after 1 January 2009 eligible to participate.

Afghanistan were the defending champions, having won the previous year's final; however, they failed to retain the title after being eliminated early following two defeats in the group stage.

== Participation ==
=== Participating teams ===
For the second consecutive year, all six member associations of the CAFA fielded teams in the final tournament.

Team	Appearance	Last appearance	Previous best performance
Afghanistan	3rd	2024 (Champions)	Champions (2024)
Iran	3rd	2024 (Fourth place)	Fourth place (2023, 2024)
Kyrgyz Republic	3rd	2024 (Sixth place)	Fifth place (2023)
Tajikistan	3rd	2024 (Third place)	Champions (2023)
Turkmenistan	2nd	2024 (Fifth place)	Fifth place (2024)
Uzbekistan	3rd	2024 (Runners-up)	Runners-up (2023, 2024)

=== Seeding ===
The 6 teams were drawn into two groups of three teams, with seeding based on their performance at the previous edition. Seeding was shown in parentheses. Host Uzbekistan was automatically seeded to Pot 1 and placed in the first position of Group A.

Pot 1	Pot 2	Pot 3
Uzbekistan (2) (hosts); Afghanistan (1)	Tajikistan (3); Iran (4)	Turkmenistan (5); Kyrgyz Republic (6)

=== Draw ===
The draw took place on 23 May 2025.

The draw resulted in the following groups:

Group A
Pos	Team
A1	Uzbekistan
A2	Iran
A3	Kyrgyz Republic

Group B
Pos	Team
B1	Afghanistan
B2	Tajikistan
B3	Turkmenistan

== Group stage ==
The match schedule was released on May 23rd, after the draw was conducted.

All times are local TJT (UTC+5).

Tiebreakers

Teams were ranked according to points (3 points for a win, 1 point for a draw, 0 points for a loss), and if tied on points, the following tie-breaking criteria were applied, in the order given, to determine the rankings:

1. Points in head-to-head matches among tied teams;
2. Goal difference in head-to-head matches among tied teams;
3. Goals scored in head-to-head matches among tied teams;
4. If more than two teams are tied, and after applying all head-to-head criteria above, a subset of teams are still tied, all head-to-head criteria above are reapplied exclusively to this subset of teams;
5. Goal difference in all group matches;
6. Goals scored in all group matches;
7. Penalty shoot-out if only two teams were tied and they met in the last round of the group;
8. Disciplinary points (yellow card = 1 point, red card as a result of two yellow cards = 3 points, direct red card = 3 points, yellow card followed by direct red card = 4 points);
9. Drawing of lots.

=== Group A ===
Pos	Team	Pld	W	D	L	GF	GA	GD	Pts	Qualification
1	Uzbekistan (H)	2	2	0	0	9	3	+6	6	Final
2	Kyrgyz Republic	2	1	0	1	5	8	−3	3	Third place play-off
3	Iran	2	0	0	2	5	8	−3	0	Fifth place play-off

Source: CAFA
Rules for classification: Tiebreakers
(H) Hosts
24 May 2025
20:30

Kyrgyz Republic	1–5	Uzbekistan
Rakhatov 54'		Ravshanbekov 24'; Abduraimov 65', 72' (pen.); Aliev 75'; Sindarov 90+4'

Dustlik Stadium, Tashkent

26 May 2025
17:30

Iran	3–4	Kyrgyz Republic
Amiri 38'; Rafie 40', 57'	Report (FFIRI)	Tolonov 9'; Mirlanov 26'; Kazakov 50'; Ishenbaev 88'

Dustlik Stadium, Tashkent
Referee: Ashraf Hussainzada (Afghanistan)

28 May 2025
20:30

Uzbekistan	4–2	Iran
Ravshanbekov 75', 88'; Sadirjanov 81'; Atabekov 90+2'	Report (FFIRI)	Rafie 13'; Shamisi 18'

Dustlik Stadium, Tashkent

=== Group B ===
Pos	Team	Pld	W	D	L	GF	GA	GD	Pts	Qualification
1	Tajikistan	2	2	0	0	7	1	+6	6	Final
2	Turkmenistan	2	1	0	1	2	4	−2	3	Third place play-off
3	Afghanistan	2	0	0	2	0	4	−4	0	Fifth place play-off

Source: CAFA
Rules for classification: Tiebreakers
24 May 2025
17:30

Turkmenistan	1–0	Afghanistan
Govshudov 5'	Report (TFF)

Dustlik Stadium, Tashkent

26 May 2025
20:30

Tajikistan	4–1	Turkmenistan
Mirahmadov 50'; Sanginov 54', 71'; Durdykakayev 90+1' (o.g.)	Report (FFT)	Hajyyev 79'

Dustlik Stadium, Tashkent

28 May 2025
17:30

Afghanistan	0–3	Tajikistan
		Rahimzoda 68'; Sanginov 89'; Shirinov 90+1'

Dustlik Stadium, Tashkent

== Play-off stage ==
=== Fifth place play-off ===
30 May 2025
17:30

Iran	3–1	Afghanistan
Rafie 8'; Mousavian Ziari 45+1'; Jafari 48'	Report (FFIRI)	Garmaseh 73' (o.g.)

Dustlik Stadium, Tashkent
Referee: Amirjon Khorkashev (Tajikistan)

=== Third place play-off ===
30 May 2025
21:00

Turkmenistan	0–0	Kyrgyz Republic
	Report (TFF)
Penalties
Govshudov (penalty scored); Meredov (penalty scored); Stepanyan (penalty scored); Shamyradov (penalty scored); Ovezmyradov (penalty missed); Zhumaniyazov (penalty scored); Durdyakakayev (penalty scored); Hamragulyyev (penalty scored)	7–6	(penalty missed) Rakhatov; (penalty scored) Bereziuk; (penalty scored) Taalaibekov; (penalty scored) Khalbaev; (penalty scored) Kazakov; (penalty scored) Turdubaev; (penalty scored) Abdyraev; (penalty missed) Nurbekov

Dustlik Stadium, Tashkent
Referee: Nikita Mustafin (Uzbekistan)

=== Final ===
31 May 2025
19:30

Uzbekistan	3–4 (a.e.t.)	Tajikistan
Abduraimov 13' (pen.); Sadirjanov 42', 93'		Odilzoda 45+2', 120'; Shirinov 95'; Karimzoda 97'

Dustlik Stadium, Tashkent
Referee: Morteza Mansourian (Iran)

== Goalscorers ==
There were 39 goals scored in 9 matches, for an average of 4.33 goals per match.

4 goals

- (Iran) Abbas Rafie

3 goals

- (Tajikistan) Parviz Sanginov
- (Uzbekistan) Laziz Abduraimov
- (Uzbekistan) Akhrorbek Ravshanbekov
- (Uzbekistan) Sukhrob Sadirjanov

2 goals

- (Tajikistan) Mehrubon Odilzoda
- (Tajikistan) Usmon Shirinov

1 goal

- (Kyrgyzstan) Ulukbek Ishenbaev
- (Kyrgyzstan) Bekzat Kazakov
- (Kyrgyzstan) Baiel Mirlanov
- (Kyrgyzstan) Kanatbek Rakhatov
- (Kyrgyzstan) Elbek Tolonov
- (Iran) Mobin Amiri
- (Iran) Pouya Jafari
- (Iran) Alireza Mousavian
- (Iran) Mojtaba Shamisi
- (Tajikistan) Komron Karimzoda
- (Tajikistan) Muhammadjon Mirahmadov
- (Tajikistan) Furqon Rahimzoda
- (Turkmenistan) Aymrat Hajyyev
- (Turkmenistan) Suleymannazar Govshudov
- (Uzbekistan) Rustam Aliev
- (Uzbekistan) Khusanboy Atabekov
- (Uzbekistan) Khumoyun Sindarov

1 own goal

- (Iran) Amirhossein Tavakoli (against Afghanistan)
- (Turkmenistan) Hajymuhammet Durdykakayev (against Tajikistan)

Source: CAFA
