= 2004 AFC U-17 Championship qualification =

The AFC U-17 Championship 2004 Qualification was held from 11 October through 15, 2003. The drawing for its matchups was conducted on 18 July 2003, at the AFC office in Kuala Lumpur.

== Group 1 ==
Pos	Team	Pld	W	D	L	GF	GA	GD	Pts	Qualification
1	Kuwait	2	1	1	0	4	3	+1	4	Final tournament
2	Jordan	2	0	1	1	3	4	−1	1	

11 October 2003

Kuwait	2–1	Jordan

Kuwait
15 October 2003

Jordan	2–2	Kuwait

Jordan

== Group 2 ==
Both matches played in Oman

Pos	Team	Pld	W	D	L	GF	GA	GD	Pts	Qualification
1	Oman (H)	2	2	0	0	10	0	+10	6	Final tournament
2	Palestine	2	0	0	2	0	10	−10	0	

11 October 2003

Palestine	0–5	Oman

Oman
14 October 2003

Oman	5–0	Palestine

Oman

== Group 3 ==
All matches in Saudi Arabia

Pos	Team	Pld	W	D	L	GF	GA	GD	Pts	Qualification
1	Iraq	2	2	0	0	5	2	+3	6	Final tournament
2	United Arab Emirates	2	1	0	1	3	4	−1	3	
3	Saudi Arabia (H)	2	0	0	2	0	2	−2	0	

11 October 2003

United Arab Emirates	2–4	Iraq

Saudi Arabia
13 October 2003

Iraq	1–0	Saudi Arabia

Saudi Arabia
15 October 2003

Saudi Arabia	0–1	United Arab Emirates

Saudi Arabia

== Group 4 ==
All matches in Qatar

Pos	Team	Pld	W	D	L	GF	GA	GD	Pts	Qualification
1	Qatar (H)	2	2	0	0	13	1	+12	6	Final tournament
2	Bahrain	2	1	0	1	2	4	−2	3	
3	Lebanon	2	0	0	2	0	10	−10	0	

11 October 2003

Bahrain	1–0	Lebanon

Qatar
13 October 2003

Lebanon	0–9	Qatar

Qatar
15 October 2003

Qatar	4–1	Bahrain

Qatar

== Group 5 ==
All matches in Iran

Pos	Team	Pld	W	D	L	GF	GA	GD	Pts	Qualification
1	Iran (H)	2	2	0	0	8	4	+4	6	Final tournament
2	Turkmenistan	2	1	0	1	6	7	−1	3	
3	Tajikistan	2	0	0	2	5	8	−3	0	

11 October 2003

Iran	4–2	Tajikistan

Iran
13 October 2003

Tajikistan	3–4	Turkmenistan

Iran
15 October 2003

Turkmenistan	2–4	Iran

Iran

== Group 6 ==
All matches in New Delhi, India

Pos	Team	Pld	W	D	L	GF	GA	GD	Pts	Qualification
1	India (H)	2	1	1	0	5	1	+4	4	Final tournament
2	Nepal	2	1	1	0	3	1	+2	4	
3	Afghanistan	2	0	0	2	0	6	−6	0	

1 December 2003

India	1–1	Nepal

New Delhi, India
3 December 2003

Nepal	2–0	Afghanistan

New Delhi, India
5 December 2003

Afghanistan	0–4	India

New Delhi, India

== Group 7 ==
All matches in Uzbekistan

Pos	Team	Pld	W	D	L	GF	GA	GD	Pts	Qualification
1	Uzbekistan	2	2	0	0	10	1	+9	6	Final tournament
2	Sri Lanka	2	1	0	1	4	4	0	3	
3	Bhutan	2	0	0	2	0	9	−9	0	

29 October 2003

Uzbekistan	4–1	Sri Lanka

Uzbekistan
31 October 2003

Sri Lanka	3–0	Bhutan

Uzbekistan
2 November 2003

Bhutan	0–6	Uzbekistan

Uzbekistan

== Group 8 ==
Both matches in Bangladesh

Pos	Team	Pld	W	D	L	GF	GA	GD	Pts	Qualification
1	Bangladesh	2	2	0	0	3	0	+3	6	Final tournament
2	Kyrgyzstan	2	0	0	2	0	3	−3	0	

11 October 2003

Bangladesh	1–0	Kyrgyzstan

Bangladesh
13 October 2003

Kyrgyzstan	0–2	Bangladesh

Bangladesh

== Group 9 ==
Pos	Team	Pld	W	D	L	GF	GA	GD	Pts	Qualification
1	Thailand	2	2	0	0	7	1	+6	6	Final tournament
2	Singapore	2	0	0	2	1	7	−6	0	
–	Timor-Leste	withdrew								

11 December 2003

Thailand	4–0	Singapore

Thailand
13 December 2003

Singapore	1–3	Thailand

Singapore

== Group 10 ==
All matches in Laos

Pos	Team	Pld	W	D	L	GF	GA	GD	Pts	Qualification
1	Laos	2	2	0	0	8	0	+8	6	Final tournament
2	Myanmar	2	1	0	1	3	2	+1	3	
3	Maldives	2	0	0	2	0	9	−9	0	

28 November 2003

Maldives	0–3	Myanmar

Laos
30 November 2003

Laos	6–0	Maldives

Laos
2 December 2003

Myanmar	0–2	Laos

Laos

== Group 11 ==
All matches in Vietnam

Pos	Team	Pld	W	D	L	GF	GA	GD	Pts	Qualification
1	Vietnam	2	2	0	0	10	0	+10	6	Final tournament
2	Cambodia	2	1	0	1	4	6	–2	3	
3	Philippines	2	0	0	2	2	10	−8	0	

11 October 2003

Philippines	0–6	Vietnam

Vietnam
13 October 2003

Cambodia	4–2	Philippines

Vietnam
15 October 2003

Vietnam	4–0	Cambodia

Vietnam

== Group 12 ==
Pos	Team	Pld	W	D	L	GF	GA	GD	Pts	Qualification
1	Malaysia	2	1	1	0	4	2	+2	4	Final tournament
2	Indonesia	2	0	1	1	2	4	–2	1	
–	Brunei	withdrew								

10 December 2003

Malaysia	3–1	Indonesia

Malaysia
14 December 2003

Indonesia	1–1	Malaysia

Indonesia

== Group 13 ==
All matches in South Korea

Pos	Team	Pld	W	D	L	GF	GA	GD	Pts	Qualification
1	South Korea	2	2	0	0	28	0	+28	6	Final tournament
2	Hong Kong	2	1	0	1	7	12	–5	3	
3	Guam	2	0	0	2	2	25	−23	0	

11 October 2003

South Korea	10–0	Hong Kong

South Korea
13 October 2003

Hong Kong	7–2	Guam

South Korea
15 October 2003

Guam	0–18	South Korea

South Korea

== Group 14 ==
All matches in North Korea

Pos	Team	Pld	W	D	L	GF	GA	GD	Pts	Qualification
1	North Korea	2	2	0	0	20	0	+20	6	Final tournament
2	Mongolia	2	0	0	2	0	20	−20	0	

13 October 2003

North Korea	9–0	Mongolia

North Korea
15 October 2003

Mongolia	0–11	North Korea

North Korea

== Group 15 ==
All matches in China

Pos	Team	Pld	W	D	L	GF	GA	GD	Pts	Qualification
1	China	2	2	0	0	30	0	+30	6	Final tournament
2	Chinese Taipei	2	1	0	8	7	12	+1	3	
3	Macau	2	0	0	2	0	31	−31	0	

11 October 2003

China	23–0	Macau

China
13 October 2003

Macau	0–8	Chinese Taipei

China
15 October 2003

Chinese Taipei	0–7	China

China

== Qualified Teams ==
- Host : Japan
- Group 1 : Kuwait
- Group 2 : Oman
- Group 3 : Iraq
- Group 4 : Qatar
- Group 5 : Iran
- Group 6 : India
- Group 7 : Uzbekistan
- Group 8 : Bangladesh
- Group 9 : Thailand
- Group 10 : Laos
- Group 11 : Vietnam
- Group 12 : Malaysia
- Group 13 : South Korea
- Group 14 : North Korea
- Group 15 : China
