= 2024 CAFA U-17 Championship =

CAFA U-17 Championship 2024
Чемпионат CAFA-2024 среди юношеских сборных (U-17)

Tournament details
- Host country: Tajikistan
- City: Dushanbe
- Dates: 17–24 August
- Teams: 6 (from 1 sub-confederation)
- Venue(s): 1 (in 1 host city)

Final positions
- Champions: Afghanistan (1st title)
- Runners-up: Uzbekistan
- Third place: Tajikistan
- Fourth place: Iran

Tournament statistics
- Matches played: 9
- Goals scored: 20 (2.22 per match)
- Top scorer(s): (Iran) Salman Ghafarifouza (3 goals)
- Best player(s): (Afghanistan) Hamid Amiri
- Best goalkeeper: (Afghanistan) Hamid Amiri
- Fair play award: Iran

The 2024 CAFA U-17 Championship was the second edition of the CAFA U-17 Championship, the international youth football championship organized by Central Asian Football Association for the men's under-17 national teams of Central Asia. The tournament was held from August 17th to 24th in Dushanbe, Tajikistan. All six CAFA members participated in the tournament, with players born on or after 1 January 2007 eligible to participate.

Host Tajikistan were the reigning champions, having claimed the title in last year's inaugural edition.

== Participation ==
=== Participating teams ===
All six CAFA member associations entered teams for the final tournament. with Turkmenistan debuting in the competition.

Team	Appearance	Last appearance	Previous best performance
Afghanistan	2nd	2023 (Third place)	Third place (2023)
Iran	2nd	2023 (Fourth place)	Fourth place (2023)
Kyrgyz Republic	2nd	2023 (Fifth place)	Fifth place (2023)
Tajikistan	2nd	2023 (Champions)	Champions (2023)
Turkmenistan	1st	Debut	
Uzbekistan	2nd	2023 (Runners-up)	Runners-up (2023)

=== Squads ===
Players born on or after 1 January 2008 and on or before 31 December 2009 were eligible to compete in the tournament.

=== Seeding ===
The 6 teams were drawn into two groups of three teams, with seeding based on their performance at the previous edition. Seeding was shown in parentheses except the team who previously did not participate, which were denoted by (–).

The host Tajikistan automatically seeded to Pot 1 and placed into the first position of Group A.

Pot 1	Pot 2	Pot 3
Tajikistan (1) (hosts); Uzbekistan (2)	Afghanistan (3); Iran (4)	Kyrgyz Republic (5); Turkmenistan (–)

=== Draw ===
The draw took place on 15 August 2024.

The draw resulted in the following groups:

Group A
Pos	Team
A1	Tajikistan
A2	Afghanistan
A3	Kyrgyz Republic

Group B
Pos	Team
B1	Uzbekistan
B2	Iran
B3	Turkmenistan

== Group stage ==
The match schedule was released on August 15th, after the draw was conducted.

All times are local TJT (UTC+5).

Tiebreakers

Teams were ranked according to points (3 points for a win, 1 point for a draw, 0 points for a loss), and if tied on points, the following tie-breaking criteria were applied, in the order given, to determine the rankings:

1. Points in head-to-head matches among tied teams;
2. Goal difference in head-to-head matches among tied teams;
3. Goals scored in head-to-head matches among tied teams;
4. If more than two teams are tied, and after applying all head-to-head criteria above, a subset of teams are still tied, all head-to-head criteria above are reapplied exclusively to this subset of teams;
5. Goal difference in all group matches;
6. Goals scored in all group matches;
7. Penalty shoot-out if only two teams were tied and they met in the last round of the group;
8. Disciplinary points (yellow card = 1 point, red card as a result of two yellow cards = 3 points, direct red card = 3 points, yellow card followed by direct red card = 4 points);
9. Drawing of lots.

=== Group A ===
Pos	Team	Pld	W	D	L	GF	GA	GD	Pts	Qualification
1	Afghanistan	2	2	0	0	3	0	+3	6	Final
2	Tajikistan (H)	2	1	0	1	3	1	+2	3	Third place play-off
3	Kyrgyz Republic	2	0	0	2	0	5	−5	0	Fifth place play-off

Source: CAFA
Rules for classification: Tiebreakers
(H) Hosts
17 August 2024
21:30

Kyrgyz Republic	0–3	Tajikistan
	Report (FFT)	Nazriev 71'; Shoev 85'; Ashuralizoda 90+3'

Republican Central Stadium, Dushanbe
Referee: Akobirkhuja Shukrullaev (Uzbekistan)

19 August 2024
18:30

Afghanistan	2–0	Kyrgyz Republic
Ahmadi 6'; Safi 43'	Report (FFT)

Republican Central Stadium, Dushanbe
Referee: Arslan Goshanov (Turkmenistan)

21 August 2024
21:30

Tajikistan	0–1	Afghanistan
	Report (FFT)	Sarwari 6'

Republican Central Stadium, Dushanbe
Referee: Morteza Mansourian (Iran)

=== Group B ===
Pos	Team	Pld	W	D	L	GF	GA	GD	Pts	Qualification
1	Uzbekistan	2	2	0	0	2	0	+2	6	Final
2	Iran	2	1	0	1	6	2	+4	3	Third place play-off
3	Turkmenistan	2	0	0	2	1	7	−6	0	Fifth place play-off

Source: CAFA
Rules for classification: Tiebreakers
17 August 2024
18:30

Turkmenistan	0–1	Uzbekistan
	Report (FFT)	Tulaganmirzaev 7'

Republican Central Stadium, Dushanbe

19 August 2024
21:30

Iran	6–1	Turkmenistan
Kazemirekabdarkolaei 11'; Ghafarifouza 21', 36', 48'; Mehralian 31' (pen.); Khodadadian Miri 87'	Report (FFT)	Gowşudow 90+1'

Republican Central Stadium, Dushanbe
Referee: Sanzhar Zhakypbekov (Kyrgyzstan)

21 August 2024
18:30

Uzbekistan	1–0	Iran
Abdukarimov 90+4'	Report (FFT)

Republican Central Stadium, Dushanbe
Referee: Abdullo Davlatov (Tajikistan)

== Play-off stage ==
=== Fifth place play-off ===
23 August 2024
18:00

Kyrgyz Republic	0–2	Turkmenistan
		Babaýew 17' (pen.); Nasyrow 49'

Republican Central Stadium, Dushanbe
Referee: Morteza Mansourian (Iran)

=== Third place play-off ===
23 August 2024
21:30

Iran	1–1	Tajikistan
Nazarzoda 49' (o.g.)		Davlatzoda 89'
Penalties
Hosseini (penalty scored); Mohammadi (penalty missed); Mehralian (penalty scored); Jolokhani Niaraki (penalty missed)	2–4	(penalty scored) Zarifzoda; (penalty scored) Bobonazarov; (penalty scored) Ashuralizoda; (penalty scored) Makhtumov

Republican Central Stadium, Dushanbe
Referee: Akobirkhuja Shukrullaev (Uzbekistan)

=== Final ===
24 August 2024
20:00

Afghanistan	1–0	Uzbekistan
Hajizade 27'

Republican Central Stadium, Dushanbe
Referee: Abdullo Davlatov (Tajikistan)

== Goalscorers ==
There were 20 goals scored in 9 matches, for an average of 2.22 goals per match.

3 goals

- (Iran) Salman Ghafarifouza

1 goal

- (Afghanistan) Arash Ahmadi
- (Afghanistan) Azamuddin Hajizade
- (Afghanistan) Yaser Safi
- (Afghanistan) Sahil Sarwari
- (Iran) Abolfazl Kazemirekabdarkolaei
- (Iran) Mohammadamin Mehralian
- (Iran) Erfan Khodadadian Miri
- (Tajikistan) Muhammad Nazriev
- (Tajikistan) Akhmadjon Shoev
- (Tajikistan) Nazrullo Ashuralizoda
- (Tajikistan) Idris Davlatzoda
- (Turkmenistan) Kakamyrat Babaýew
- (Turkmenistan) Süleýmannazar Gowşudow
- (Turkmenistan) Muhammedaly Nasyrow
- (Uzbekistan) Sardorbek Tolaganmirzayev
- (Uzbekistan) Miraziz Abdukarimov

1 own goal

- (Tajikistan) Bakhodur Nazarzoda (against Iran)

Source: CAFA
