= Mehrubon Odilzoda =

Tajikistani footballer (born 2009)

Personal information
- Date of birth: 15 September 2009 (age 17)
- Place of birth: Tajikistan
- Height: 1.76 m (5 ft 9 in)
- Position: Defensive midfielder

Team information
- Current team: Istiklol
- Number: 14

Youth career
- Istiklol

Senior career*
Years	Team	Apps	(Gls)
2025–	Istiklol	8	(0)

International career^{‡}
2022	Tajikistan U14	4	(1)
2023–	Tajikistan U17	15	(4)
2026–	Tajikistan U20	1+	(1)
- * Club domestic league appearances and goals as of 08:43, 13 November 2026 (UTC) ‡ National team caps and goals as of 08:43, 13 November 2026 (UTC)

Mehrubon Odilzoda (Tajik: Мехрубон Одилзода; born 15 September 2009) is a Tajikistani footballer who plays as a defensive midfielder for Tajikistan Higher League club Istiklol.

== Club career ==
Odilzoda currently plays for Tajikistan Higher League club Istiklol.

== International career ==
In 2022, Odilzoda represented Tajikistan's under-14 national team at the 2022 CAFA U-14 Championship. By 2023, he was playing for the under-17 national team at the 2023 CAFA U-17 Championship. At the 2025 edition of the tournament, he scored twice in the final against Uzbekistan and was awarded the best player of the tournament. He also represented them at the AFC U-17 Asian Cup in 2025 and 2026, as well as the 2025 FIFA U-17 World Cup.

In August 2026, he was called up to the Tajikistan under-20 national team for 2027 AFC U-20 Asian Cup qualification, where he scored in a 4–1 win against Afghanistan.

== Style of play ==
Odilzoda has been described as a creative midfielder, who is able to control the tempo and intensity of matches. On their Next Generation 2026 list, The Guardian described him as a "steady defensive midfielder who is composed beyond his years", and that despite only being 16, he failed to look out of place with the Tajikistan under-20 national team.
