= Mewlan Mijit =

Chinese footballer (born 2004)

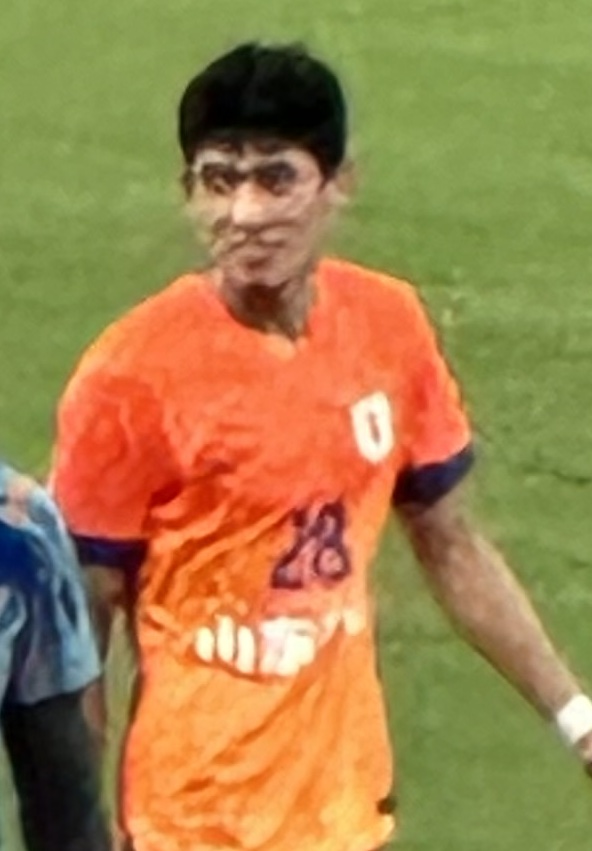
- Mewlan in August 2024

Personal information
- Full name: Mewlan Mijit
- Date of birth: 27 January 2004 (age 22)
- Place of birth: Huocheng, Xinjiang, China
- Height: 1.84 m (6 ft 0 in)
- Position: Attacking midfielder

Team information
- Current team: Shandong Taishan
- Number: 28

Youth career
- –2022: Shandong Taishan

Senior career*
Years	Team	Apps	(Gls)
2022–	Shandong Taishan	31	(3)
2025	→ Qingdao Hainiu (loan)	11	(0)

International career^{‡}
2022–2023	China U20	5	(1)
2024	China U21	2	(0)
- * Club domestic league appearances and goals as of 19 November 2026 ‡ National team caps and goals as of 22 November 2025

Mewlan Mijit (simplified Chinese: 买乌郎·米吉提; traditional Chinese: 買烏郎·米吉提; pinyin: Mǎiwūláng Mǐjítí; born 27 January 2004) is a Chinese professional footballer who plays as an attacking midfielder for Chinese Super League club Shandong Taishan.

== Club career ==
=== Early career ===
Born in Huocheng County in Xinjiang, he joined the youth academy of Chinese Super League club Shandong Luneng Taishan, and became part of the 2019 U15 National Youth Super League. In the competition, Mewlan and teammate He Xiaoke were awarded with the Golden Boot award for the competition, scoring seven goals each.

=== Shandong Taishan ===
After entering the Shandong Taishan first-team in the 2022 season and due to injuries incurred on a few Shandong starters, Mewlan made his senior and professional debut on 15 December 2022, starting the game and playing the first-half of a Chinese Super League fixture against Guangzhou in a 4–2 win. In the third minute of the match, Mewlan provided an assist for Moisés to open the scoring for Shandong Taishan. On 19 December 2022, he was given his second and only other appearance of the season in an 8–0 win over Shenzhen, coming on as an 88th minute substitute for Chen Pu.

On 24 June 2023, Mewlan scored his first goal for the club in a 6–1 win over Dongguan United in the 2023 Chinese FA Cup. On 19 September 2023, Mewlan made his AFC Champions League debut, when he came on as a 90th minute substitute for Song Long in Shandong's first group stage match away at Kaya. At the start of the 2024 season on 15 April, he was put in the starting lineup and played 63 minutes in a Chinese Super League clash against defending champions Shanghai Port; the match finished 4–3 for Shanghai Port. After being given a run of appearances in the latter half of the 2024 season, he scored his first goal in the Chinese Super League on 28 September 2024, in a 4–1 away win against Shenzhen Peng City.

On 17 July 2025, Mewlan was loaned to Chinese Super League club Qingdao Hainiu.

== International career ==
In February 2023, Mewlan was selected as part of the China U20 squad for the 2023 AFC U-20 Asian Cup. On 12 March 2023, he came on as an extra-time substitute for Hu Hetao in the quarter-final tie against South Korea.

On 3 January 2025, Mewlan received his first call-up from the China senior national team for a training camp.

== Personal life ==
Mewlan is an ethnic Uyghur.

== Career statistics ==
=== Club ===
As of 22 November 2025

Appearances and goals by club, season, and competition
Club	Season	League			Cup		Continental		Other		Total	
Club	Season	Division	Apps	Goals	Apps	Goals	Apps	Goals	Apps	Goals	Apps	Goals
Shandong Taishan	2022	Chinese Super League	2	0	0	0	0 (Note: Appearances in AFC Champions League)	0	–		2	0
Shandong Taishan	2023	Chinese Super League	2	0	2	1	1	0	0 (Note: Appearances in Chinese FA Super Cup)	0	5	1
Shandong Taishan	2024	Chinese Super League	10	1	1	0	2 (Note: 1 appearance in AFC Champions League, 1 appearance in AFC Champions League Elite)	0	–		13	1
Shandong Taishan	2025	Chinese Super League	4	0	1	0	1 (Note: Appearances in AFC Champions League Elite)	0	–		6	0
Shandong Taishan	Total		18	1	4	1	4	0	0	0	26	2
Qingdao Hainiu	2025	Chinese Super League	11	0	1	0	–		–		12	0
Career total			29	1	5	1	4	0	0	0	38	2
