= List of football stadiums in Iran =

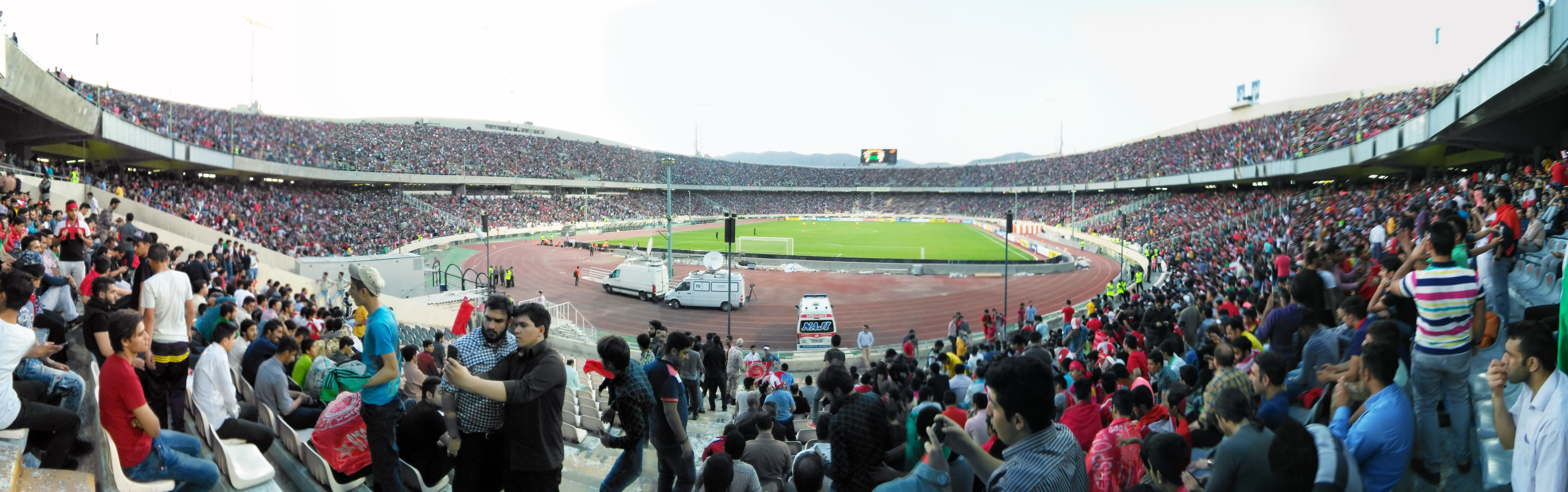
The 78,116-capacity Azadi Stadium is the home of Esteghlal and Persepolis.

The following is a list of football stadiums in Iran, ordered by capacity. The minimum capacity in this table is 15,000. Stadiums in bold are currently used in Persian Gulf Pro League.

== Existing stadiums ==
Num	Name	capacity	date	city	pics	Hosting
1	**Azadi Stadium**	78,116	1974	Tehran		Iran national football team, Persepolis F.C., Esteghlal F.C.
2	**Naghsh-e Jahan Stadium**	75,000	2003	Isfahan		Sepahan S.C.
3	**Yadegar-e Emam Stadium**	66,833	1996	Tabriz		Tractor S.C.
4	**Pars Shiraz Stadium**	50,000	2017	Shiraz		Fajr Sepasi F.C.
5	**Ghadir Stadium**	38,900	2012	Ahvaz		Esteghlal Khuzestan F.C.
6	**Foolad Arena**	30,655	2018	Ahvaz		Foolad F.C.
7	Takhti Stadium (Tehran)	30,122	1973	Tehran		Saipa F.C.
8	Shohadaye Mes Kerman Stadium	30,000	2024	Kerman		Sanat Mes Kerman F.C.
9	Imam Reza Stadium	27,700	2017	Mashhad		
10	Samen Stadium	27,000	2004	Mashhad		
11	Shahid Shiroudi Stadium	25,000	1942	Tehran		
12	**Fuladshahr Stadium**	20,000	1998	Fuladshahr		Zob Ahan Esfahan F.C.
13	Rah Ahan-e Ekbatan Stadium	20,000	1973	Tehran		
14	Hafezieh Stadium	20,000	1945	Shiraz		
15	University of Tehran Stadium	20,000	1978	Tehran		
16	Khalij-e Fars Stadium	20,000	2010	Bandar Abbas	border|frameless	
17	Dr. Azodi Stadium	17,276	1984	Rasht		S.C. Damash Gilan
18	**Shohada-ye Shahr-e Qods Stadium**	17,000	2004	Shahr-e Qods		Paykan F.C., Havadar S.C.
19	**Vatani Stadium**	15,000	1946	Qaem Shahr		Nassaji Mazandaran F.C.
20	Shahid Bakeri Stadium	15,000	2018	Urmia		Navad Urmia F.C.
21	Takhti Stadium (Ahvaz)	15,000	1978	Ahvaz		Esteghlal Ahvaz F.C.

== Smaller stadiums ==
The list below has stadiums with a capacity below 15,000. The minimum required capacity is 5,000.

Stadium	Capacity	Tenants
Yadegar-e Emam Stadium	12,000	Saba Qom F.C.
Shahid Nassiri Stadium	12,000	Chadormalou Ardakan S.C. and Shahid Ghandi Yazd
Rah Ahan Stadium	12,000	Rah Ahan
Shohadaye Mes	10,000	Mes Rafsanjan
Takhti Stadium	10,000	Sanat Naft
Shahid Hajibabaei Stadium	10,000	PAS Hamedan F.C.
Sirous Ghayeghran	9,000	Malavan
Shahid Dastgerdi Stadium	8,250	Paykan and Iran U-20
Shohada Stadium	6,000	Shemushack Noshahr

== Future stadiums ==
Num	Name	Capacity
1	Badran stadium	160,000
2	Persian Gulf	120,000
3	Azadi 2 Stadium	45,000
4	Gohar Park Stadium	40,000
5	Lor Arena	40,000
6	Zanjan Stadium	45,000
7	Borujerd Arena Stadium	45,000
8	Perspolis Stadium	50,000
9	Esteghlal Stadium	50,000
10	Shahrood Stadium	15,000
11	Shohada-ye Haftom-e Tir Khoye Stadium	15,000
12	Chabahar	15,000
13	5 Mehr Abadan	35,000
14	Sabzevar Stadium	15,000
15	Damghan Stadium	15,000
16	Minab Stadium	10,000

== See also ==
- List of Asian stadiums by capacity
- List of association football stadiums by capacity
- List of association football stadiums by country
- List of sports venues by capacity
- Lists of stadiums
- Persian wikipedia
- Yjc
