= Reza Zuhro =

Indonesian footballer

Personal information
- Full name: Muhammad Reza Zuhro Ussurur
- Date of birth: 2 January 2004 (age 22)
- Place of birth: Jombang, Indonesia
- Height: 1.74 m (5 ft 9 in)
- Position: Midfielder

Team information
- Current team: Persikotas Nusantara

Youth career
- 2021–2022: Barito Putera U20

Senior career*
Years	Team	Apps	(Gls)
2022–2026	Barito Putera	7	(0)
2025–2026	→ Persekat Tegal (loan)	5	(0)
2026–	Persikotas Nusantara	0	(0)
- * Club domestic league appearances and goals as of 16 January 2026 (UTC)

Muhammad Reza Zuhro Ussurur (born 2 January 2004) is an Indonesian professional footballer who plays as a midfielder for Liga Nusantara club Persikotas Nusantara.

== Club career ==
=== PS Barito Putera ===
Zuhro is one of the young players promoted from the Barito Putera U20 team, alongside Iqbal Gwijangge and Aditiya Daffa. On 6 December 2022, Zuhro made his professional league debut for Barito Putera in a match that ended in a 3–2 loss against Persebaya Surabaya at Maguwoharjo Stadium.

== Career statistics ==
=== Club ===
As of 16 January 2026

Club	Season	League		Cup		Continental		Other		Total	
Club	Season	Apps	Goals	Apps	Goals	Apps	Goals	Apps	Goals	Apps	Goals
PS Barito Putera	2022–23	6	0	0	0	–		0	0	6	0
PS Barito Putera	2023–24	1	0	0	0	–		0	0	1	0
PS Barito Putera	2024–25	0	0	0	0	–		0	0	0	0
Persekat Tegal (loan)	2025–26	5	0	0	0	—		0	0	5	0
Career total		12	0	0	0	0	0	0	0	12	0
