= Fan Chao =

Chinese footballer (born 2004)

Personal information
- Date of birth: 8 February 2004 (age 22)
- Place of birth: Hefei, Anhui, China
- Height: 1.87 m (6 ft 2 in)
- Position: Forward

Team information
- Current team: Changchun Yatai
- Number: 44

Youth career
- 2014–2022: Changchun Yatai

Senior career*
Years	Team	Apps	(Gls)
2022–	Changchun Yatai	11	(0)
2024	→ Guangxi Pingguo Haliao (loan)	25	(4)
2025	→ Guangxi Pingguo (loan)	12	(1)

International career
2018–2019	China U15	4	(4)
2021–2023	China U20		
- * Club domestic league appearances and goals as of 1 March 2026 (UTC)

Fan Chao (Chinese: 樊超; born 8 February 2004) is a Chinese footballer currently playing as a forward for Changchun Yatai.

== Club career ==
Born in Hefei, Anhui, Fan began his career with Changchun Yatai at the age of ten, after being spotted by youth coach Sun Maofeng. In 2016, following impressive performances at the Audi Youth Cup, Fan was invited to train with Spanish side Barcelona. He continued to progress through the academy of Changchun Yatai, making his debut in a 3–0 loss to Beijing Guoan. He went on to play in three more games in the 2022 season, including the 4–0 defeat to Shanghai Port on the final day of the season. Despite his team's poor results towards the end of the season, Fan garnered praise for his performances.

== International career ==
Fan has represented China from under-14 to under-20 level. He scored four goals in four appearances in qualification for the 2020 AFC U-16 Championship, which was eventually cancelled.

Following impressive performances for the under-19 team, the Chinese Football Association wrote to his club, Changchun Yatai, to thank them for supporting the development of young Chinese players.

== Career statistics ==
=== Club ===
As of 1 March 2026.

Appearances and goals by club, season and competition
Club	Season	League			Cup		Continental		Other		Total	
Club	Season	Division	Apps	Goals	Apps	Goals	Apps	Goals	Apps	Goals	Apps	Goals
Changchun Yatai	2022	Chinese Super League	4	0	0	0	—		—		4	0
Changchun Yatai	2023	Chinese Super League	5	0	1	0	—		—		6	0
Changchun Yatai	2025	Chinese Super League	2	0	0	0	—		—		2	0
Changchun Yatai	Total		11	0	1	0	0	0	0	0	12	0
Guangxi Pingguo Haliao (loan)	2024	China League One	25	4	1	0	—		—		26	4
Guangxi Pingguo (loan)	2025	China League One	12	1	0	0	—		—		12	1
Career total			48	5	2	0	0	0	0	0	50	5
