= Foolad Arena =

Football stadium in Ahvaz, Iran

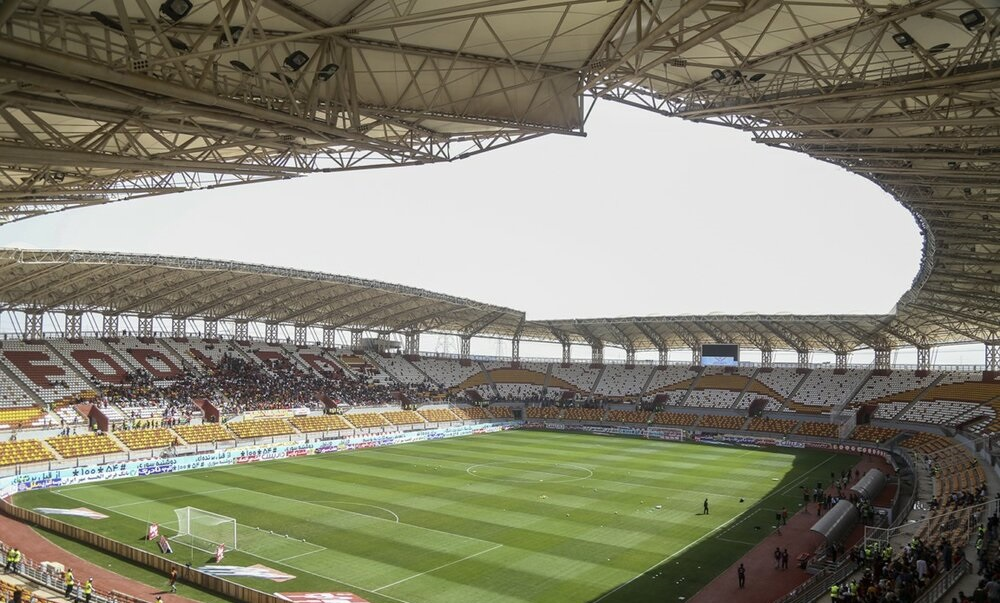
- Interactive map of Foolad Arena
- Location: Ahvaz, Iran
- Coordinates: 31°16′46″N 48°46′48″E
- Owner: Foolad
- Operator: Foolad
- Capacity: 35,000
- Executive suites: 12
- Surface: Grass
- Scoreboard: LCD
- Field size: 105 x 68 m

Construction
- Groundbreaking: December 2, 2011
- Opened: November 13, 2018
- Cost: $40 million
- Architect: Amir Rostami sani
- Builder: Ideh Pardazan Sana'at Foolad
- Project managers: Pars Gostareh; Jahan Kowsar Company; Habibollah Sabzpoosh

Tenant
- Foolad

Website
- www.fooladfc.ir

Foolad Khuzestan Stadium or Foolad Arena (Persian: فولاد آرنا, Fulâd Ârena), is a stadium in Ahvaz, which was opened on 13 November 2018. It hosts the home matches of Foolad F.C. since March 2019. The stadium was planned to be completed by November 2013, which was changed to middle of 2018 due to financial problems.

== Design ==
It will seat 30,655 people for football matches and up to 35,000 people for other events.

== Building and facilities ==
The stadium is located in the plan Foolad Sports Complex, which is included 27,000 and 5,000 capacity football stadiums, training camp, futsal arena, volleyball and basketball halls and two pools which one of them opened in 2012.

== Gallery ==
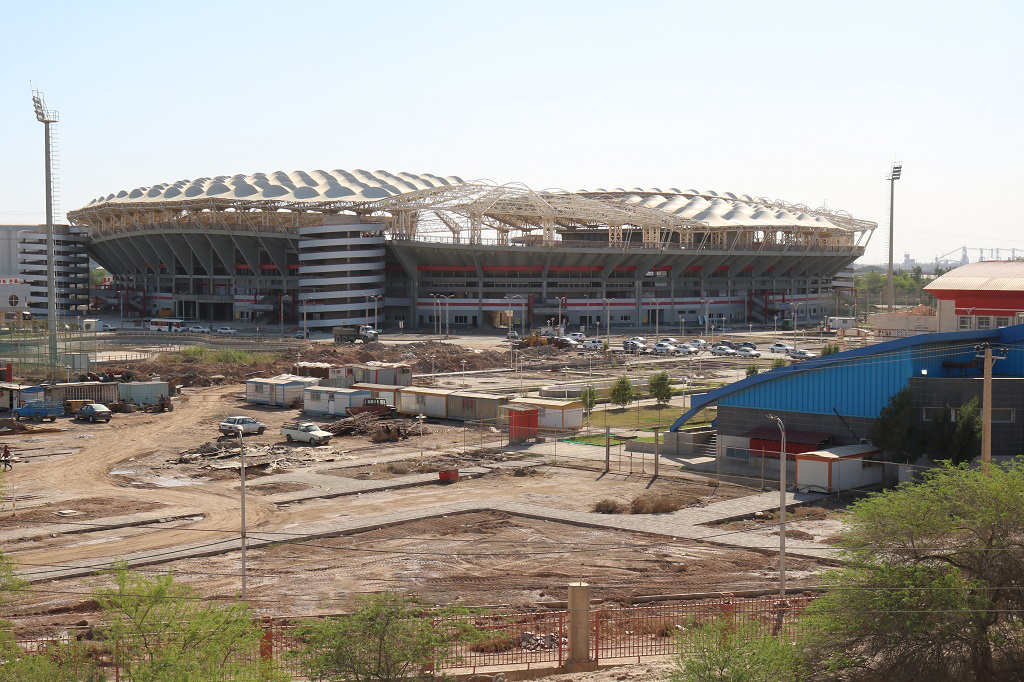
Outdoor of the stadium under construction.

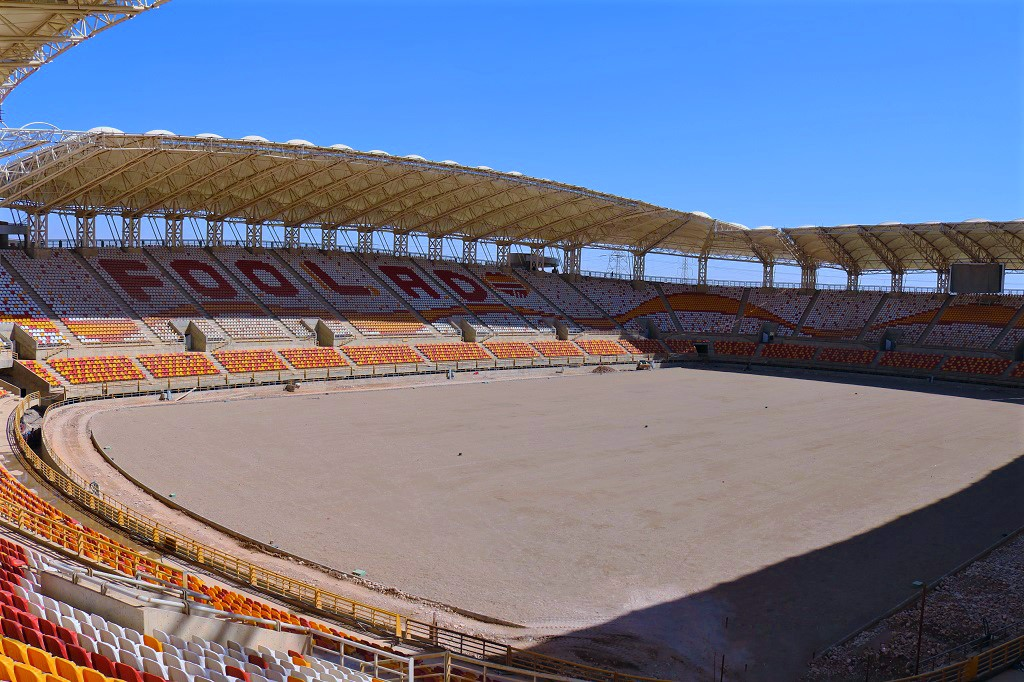
Foolad Arena under construction.

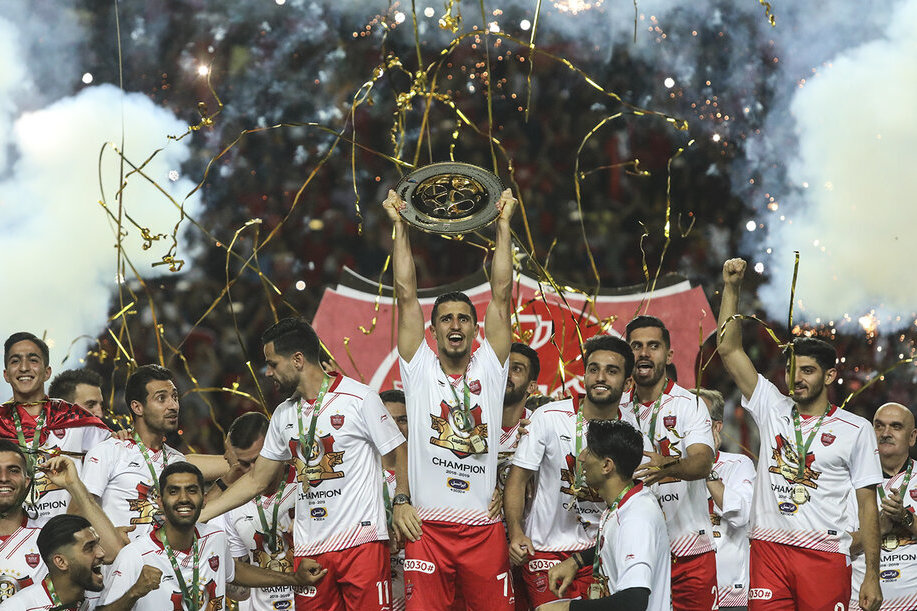
2018–19 Hazfi Cup Final in Foolad Arena.

== See also ==
- Ghadir Stadium
- List of football stadiums in Iran
- Lists of stadiums
