= Aditiya Daffa =

Indonesian footballer

Personal information
- Full name: Aditiya Daffa Al-Haqi
- Date of birth: 11 January 2004 (age 22)
- Place of birth: Jakarta, Indonesia
- Height: 1.70 m (5 ft 7 in)
- Positions: Defensive midfielder; right-back

Team information
- Current team: Barito Putera
- Number: 24

Youth career
- 2018–2019: Persitangsel
- 2020–2024: Barito Putera

Senior career*
| Years | Team | Apps | (Gls) |
| 2021– | Barito Putera | 45 | (0) |

International career^{‡}
| 2019–2020 | Indonesia U16 | 6 | (3) |
Medal record
Men's football
Representing Indonesia
AFF U-16 Youth Championship
| Third place | 2019 Thailand |
- * Club domestic league appearances and goals as of 3 May 2026 ‡ National team caps and goals as of 19 August 2019

Aditiya Daffa Al-Haqi (born 11 January 2004) is an Indonesian professional footballer who plays as a defensive midfielder or right-back for Liga 2 club Barito Putera.

== Club career ==
=== Barito Putera ===
Daffa is one of the young players promoted from the Barito Putera U20 alongside Iqbal Gwijangge and Reza Zuhro. Daffa made his first-team debut on 4 September 2021 in a match against Persib Bandung at the Indomilk Arena, Tangerang.

== Career statistics ==
=== Club ===
As of 3 May 2026.

| Club | Season | League | | Cup | | Other | | Total | |
| Club | Season | Apps | Goals | Apps | Goals | Apps | Goals | Apps | Goals |
|---|---|---|---|---|---|---|---|---|---|
| Barito Putera | 2021 | 2 | 0 | 0 | 0 | 0 | 0 | 2 | 0 |
| Barito Putera | 2022–23 | 3 | 0 | 0 | 0 | 0 | 0 | 3 | 0 |
| Barito Putera | 2023–24 | 0 | 0 | 0 | 0 | 0 | 0 | 0 | 0 |
| Barito Putera | 2024–25 | 17 | 0 | 0 | 0 | 0 | 0 | 17 | 0 |
| Barito Putera | 2025–26 | 23 | 0 | 0 | 0 | 0 | 0 | 23 | 0 |
| Career total | | 45 | 0 | 0 | 0 | 0 | 0 | 45 | 0 |

== Honours ==
=== International ===
Indonesia U-16

- AFF U-16 Youth Championship third place: 2019
