= 2024 Shandong Taishan F.C. season =

Shandong Taishan
2024 season
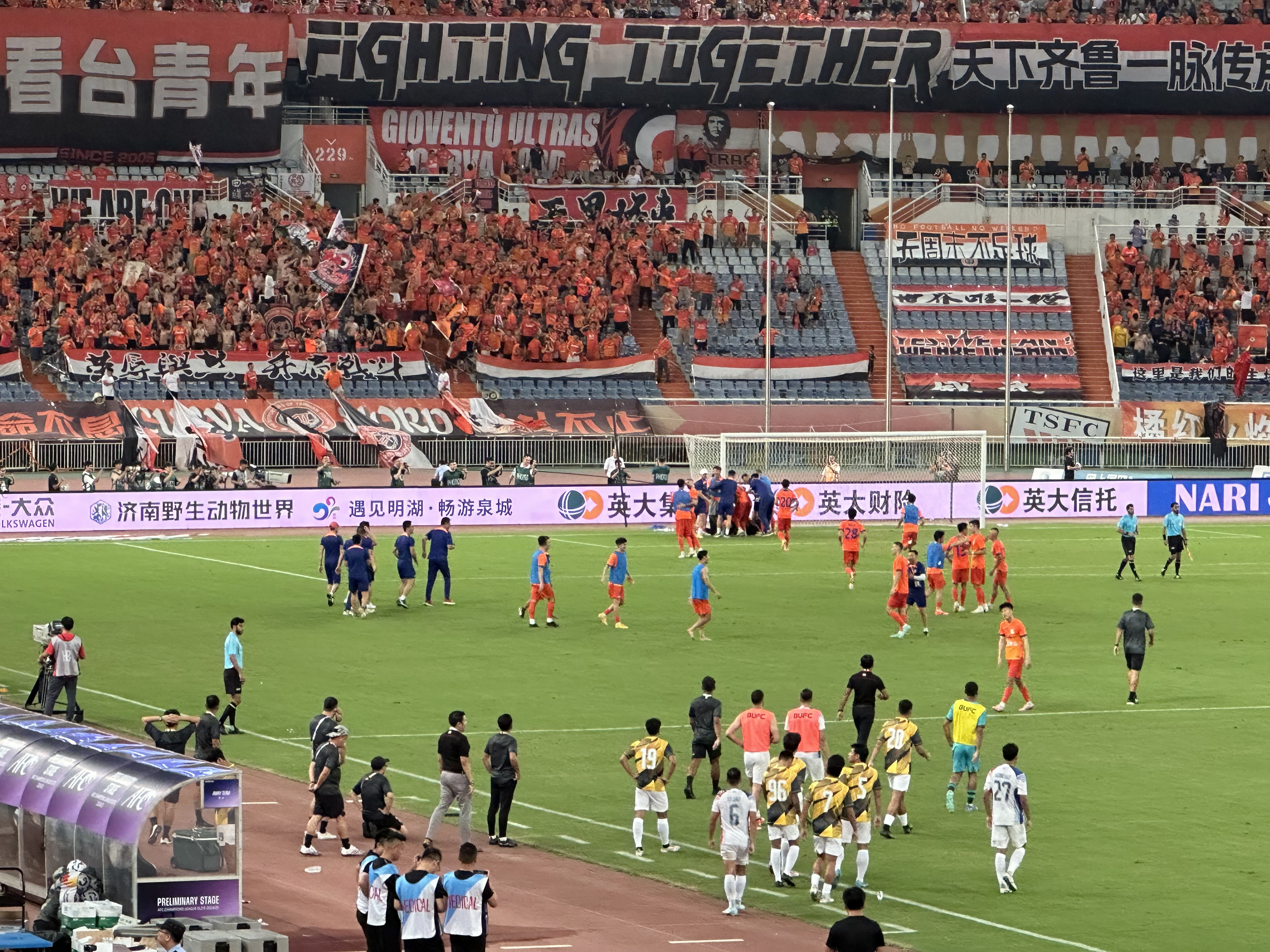
- Shandong Taishan celebrating a win over Bangkok United
- Manager: Choi Kang-hee
- Chinese Super League: 5th
- Chinese FA Cup: Final
- AFC Champions League Elite: League stage
- Top goalscorer: League: Cryzan (9); All: Cryzan (10)
- Average home league attendance: 27,208
- All statistics correct as of 28 September 2024.

The 2024 season is the 68th year of Shandong Taishan's existence and their 31st season in the top tier of Chinese football. The club is competing in the Chinese Super League, the Chinese FA Cup, and the AFC Champions League.

== Transfers ==
Pos.	Player	Transferred from	Fee	Date	Source
DF	(Brazil) Marcel Scalese	(Brazil) Ituano	Free	15 July 2024	

== Competitions ==
=== Overall record ===
Competition	First match	Last match	Starting round	Record							
Competition	First match	Last match	Starting round	Pld	W	D	L	GF	GA	GD	Win %
Chinese Super League	1 March 2024	2 November 2024	Matchday 1	0	0	0	0	0	0	+0	—
Chinese FA Cup	22 June 2024	23 November 2024		0	0	0	0	0	0	+0	—
AFC Champions League Elite			Play-off round	0	0	0	0	0	0	+0	—
Total				0	0	0	0	0	0	+0	—

Last updated: 28 September 2024
Source: Soccerway

=== Super League ===
==== League table ====
Pos	Team	Pld	W	D	L	GF	GA	GD	Pts	Qualification or relegation
3	Chengdu Rongcheng	30	18	5	7	65	31	+34	59	Qualification for AFC Champions League Elite play-off round
4	Beijing Guoan	30	16	8	6	65	35	+30	56	Qualification for AFC Champions League Two group stage
5	Shandong Taishan	30	13	9	8	49	40	+9	48	
6	Tianjin Jinmen Tiger	30	12	6	12	44	47	−3	42	
7	Zhejiang	30	11	5	14	55	60	−5	38	

Source: Soccerway
Rules for classification:
- During season: 1) Points; 2) Head-to-head points; 3) Head-to-head goal difference; 4) Head-to-head goals scored; 5) Goal difference; 6) Goals scored; 7) Rankings in the previous season. (Rules 2 to 4 are only applied when teams concerned have finished both/all the matches against others.)
- After season: 1) Points; 2) Head-to-head points; 3) Head-to-head goal difference; 4) Head-to-head goals scored; 5) Goal difference; 6) Goals scored; 7) Disciplinary points (yellow card = 1 point, red card = 3 points); 8) Drawing of lots.

==== Results summary ====
Overall								Home						Away					
Pld	W	D	L	GF	GA	GD	Pts	W	D	L	GF	GA	GD	W	D	L	GF	GA	GD
0	0	0	0	0	0	0	0	0	0	0	0	0	0	0	0	0	0	0	0

Last updated: 28 September 2024.

==== Results by round ====
Round	1	2	3	4	5	6	7	8	9	10	11	12	13	14	15	16	17	18	19	20	21	22	23	24	25	26	27	28
Ground	H	H	H	A	H	A	H	A	H	A	A	H	A	H	A	A	A	A	H	A	H	A	H	A	H	H	A	H
Result	W	D	L	W	D	L	W	W	W	D	W	W	D	W	D	D	L	L	D	L	L	L	W	W	L	D	W	
Position																												

Updated to match(es) played on 28 September 2024. Source:
A = Away; H = Home; W = Win; D = Draw; L = Loss

==== Matches ====
1 March 2024 1	Shandong Taishan	4–2	Changchun Yatai	Jinan
--:--				Stadium: Jinan Olympic Sports Center Stadium

9 March 2024 2	Shandong Taishan	0–0	Beijing Guoan	Jinan
--:--				Stadium: Jinan Olympic Sports Center Stadium

31 March 2024 3	Shandong Taishan	0–3	Shanghai Shenhua	Jinan
--:--				Stadium: Jinan Olympic Sports Center Stadium

5 April 2024 4	Qingdao Hainiu	0–1	Shandong Taishan
--:--

9 April 2024 5	Shandong Taishan	2–2	Henan	Jinan
--:--				Stadium: Jinan Olympic Sports Center Stadium

14 April 2024 6	Shanghai Port	4–3	Shandong Taishan
--:--

20 April 2024 7	Shandong Taishan	4–1	Cangzhou Mighty Lions	Jinan
--:--				Stadium: Jinan Olympic Sports Center Stadium

26 April 2024 8	Chengdu Rongcheng	0–1	Shandong Taishan
--:--

30 April 2024 9	Shandong Taishan	3–1	Nantong Zhiyun	Jinan
--:--				Stadium: Jinan Olympic Sports Center Stadium

4 May 2024 10	Qingdao West Coast	0–0	Shandong Taishan
--:--

11 May 2024 11	Wuhan Three Towns	1–2	Shandong Taishan
--:--

16 May 2024 12	Shandong Taishan	3–2	Shenzhen Peng City	Jinan
--:--				Stadium: Jinan Olympic Sports Center Stadium

21 May 2024 13	Tianjin Jinmen Tiger	1–1	Shandong Taishan
--:--

25 May 2024 14	Shandong Taishan	3–0	Zhejiang	Jinan
--:--				Stadium: Jinan Olympic Sports Center Stadium

14 June 2024 15	Meizhou Hakka	0–0	Shandong Taishan
--:--

26 June 2024 16	Changchun Yatai	2–2	Shandong Taishan
--:--

30 June 2024 17	Beijing Guoan	2–0	Shandong Taishan
--:--

6 July 2024 18	Shanghai Shenhua	6–0	Shandong Taishan
--:--

13 July 2024 19	Shandong Taishan	1–1	Qingdao Hainiu	Jinan
--:--				Stadium: Jinan Olympic Sports Center Stadium

21 July 2024 24	Nantong Zhiyun	0–2	Shandong Taishan
--:--

28 July 2024 20	Henan	1–0	Shandong Taishan
--:--

3 August 2024 21	Shandong Taishan	0–1	Shanghai Port	Jinan
--:--				Stadium: Jinan Olympic Sports Center Stadium

9 August 2024 22	Cangzhou Mighty Lions	3–1	Shandong Taishan
--:--

17 August 2024 23	Shandong Taishan	3–0	Chengdu Rongcheng	Jinan
--:--				Stadium: Jinan Olympic Sports Center Stadium

13 September 2024 25	Shandong Taishan	0–1	Qingdao West Coast	Jinan
--:--				Stadium: Jinan Olympic Sports Center Stadium

21 September 2024 26	Shandong Taishan	0–0	Wuhan Three Towns	Jinan
--:--				Stadium: Jinan Olympic Sports Center Stadium

28 September 2024 27	Shenzhen Peng City	1–4	Shandong Taishan
--:--

18 October 2024 28	Shandong Taishan	v	Tianjin Jinmen Tiger	Jinan
19:35 UTC+8				Stadium: Jinan Olympic Sports Center Stadium

=== FA Cup ===
22 June 2024 Fourth round	Chongqing Tonglianglong	3–6	Shandong Taishan	Tongliang
19:30 UTC+8		Report		Stadium: Tongliang Long Stadium

17 July 2024 Fifth round	Qingdao West Coast	0–4	Shandong Taishan	Qingdao
18:00 UTC+8		Report		Stadium: Guzhenkou University City Sports Center

21 August 2024 Quarter-finals	Shandong Taishan	3–1	Henan	Jinan
19:35 UTC+8				Stadium: Jinan Olympic Sports Center Stadium

24 September 2024 Semi-finals	Shandong Taishan	1–0	Chengdu Rongcheng	Jinan
19:35 UTC+8				Stadium: Jinan Olympic Sports Center Stadium

23 November 2024 Final	Shandong Taishan	v	Shanghai Port
19:35 UTC+8

=== AFC Champions League Elite ===
==== League stage ====
Pos	Team	Pld	W	D	L	GF	GA	GD	Pts	Qualification
8	(China) Shanghai Port	8	2	2	4	10	18	−8	8	Advance to round of 16
9	(South Korea) Pohang Steelers	7	2	0	5	9	17	−8	6	
10	(South Korea) Ulsan HD	7	1	0	6	4	16	−12	3	
11	(Australia) Central Coast Mariners	7	0	1	6	8	18	−10	1	
12	(China) Shandong Taishan	0	0	0	0	0	0	0	0	Withdrawn, record expunged (Note: Shandong Taishan were considered to have withdrawn from the AFC Champions League Elite after the club confirmed that it did not intend to report for their league stage match against Ulsan HD on 19 February 2025. Their remaining fixture was cancelled, with their seven played matches being expunged.)

Source: Asian Football Confederation
Rules for classification: 1) points; 2) goal difference; 3) number of goals scored; 4) number of matches won; 5) penalty shoot-out if only two teams remain tied and played each other on the final matchday 6) fair play ranking; 7) drawing of lots
Notes:

Round	1	2
Ground	H	A
Result	W	
Position		

Updated to match(es) played on 17 September 2024. Source: AFC
A = Away; H = Home; W = Win; D = Draw; L = Loss

17 September 2024 1	Shandong Taishan (China)	3–1	(Australia) Central Coast Mariners	Jinan
18:00 UTC+8				Stadium: Jinan Olympic Sports Center Stadium; Referee: Khalid Al-Turais (Saudi Arabia)

2 October 2024 2	Vissel Kobe (Japan)	v	(China) Shandong Taishan	Kobe, Japan
19:00 UTC+9				Stadium: Noevir Stadium Kobe
