= Yoshiki Narahara =

Japanese footballer

Personal information
- Date of birth: 7 April 2004 (age 22)
- Place of birth: Fukuoka, Japan
- Height: 1.68 m (5 ft 6 in)
- Position: Midfielder

Team information
- Current team: Sagan Tosu
- Number: 8

Youth career
- –2022: Sagan Tosu

Senior career*
Years	Team	Apps	(Gls)
2022–	Sagan Tosu	20	(1)

International career^{‡}
2019	Japan U15	2	(0)
2019–2020	Japan U16	4	(1)
2021	Japan U17		
- * Club domestic league appearances and goals as of 1 January 2026 ‡ National team caps and goals as of 17:04, 23 February 2022 (UTC)

Yoshiki Narahara (楢原 慶輝, Narahara Yoshiki; born 7 April 2004) is a Japanese footballer currently playing as a midfielder for Sagan Tosu.

== Career statistics ==
=== Club ===
As of 23 February 2022.

Club	Season	League			National Cup		League Cup		Other		Total	
Club	Season	Division	Apps	Goals	Apps	Goals	Apps	Goals	Apps	Goals	Apps	Goals
Sagan Tosu	2022	J1 League	0	0	0	0	1 (Note: Appearances in the J.League Cup)	0	0	0	1	0
Career total			0	0	0	0	1	0	0	0	1	0
