= Beknaz Almazbekov =

Kyrgyz footballer (born 2005)

Personal information
- Full name: Beknaz Almazbekovich Almazbekov
- Date of birth: 23 June 2005 (age 21)
- Place of birth: Bishkek, Kyrgyzstan
- Height: 1.74 m (5 ft 9 in)
- Position: Forward

Youth career
- 2014–2017: Alga Bishkek
- 2017–2024: Galatasaray

Senior career*
Years	Team	Apps	(Gls)
2024–2025	Llapi	9	(0)
2025–2026	Rukh Lviv	25	(0)
2026–	Liepāja	3	(0)

International career^{‡}
2019	Kyrgyzstan U16	3	(2)
2022	Kyrgyzstan U20	6	(2)
2022–	Kyrgyzstan	21	(1)
- * Club domestic league appearances and goals as of 16:15, 7 October 2026 (UTC) ‡ National team caps and goals as of 16:25, 7 October 2026 (UTC)

Beknaz Almazbekovich Almazbekov (Kyrgyz: Бекназ Алмазбеков; Russian: Бекназ Алмазбекович Алмазбеков; born 23 June 2005) is a Kyrgyz professional footballer who plays as a forward for Latvian Higher League club FK Liepāja and the Kyrgyzstan national team.

== Club career ==
=== Bishkek ===
Born in Kyrgyzstan, Almazbekov moved to Turkey as a child, as his brother had received an offer to study at a university there. He had played football in his homeland with Alga Bishkek, and was invited to join Galatasaray shortly after his arrival in Turkey. As he was under 18 at the time, the move came under investigation from UEFA, who found no fault, as Almazbekov had not moved to Turkey solely for football-related purposes.

=== Galatasaray ===
In 2019, while playing for the Galatasaray youth team, he made international headlines by deliberately missing a penalty that he felt the referee had unfairly awarded to his team. The following year, after continuing his good form with the Galatasaray youth teams, he was named by the AFC as one of the best young players in Central Asia.

In February 2022, he was promoted to the first team at the age of 16. He made his unofficial debut in a 3–1 friendly loss to Ukrainian side Dynamo Kyiv, as part of the Global Tour for Peace, coming on as a substitute for Emre Kılınç.

In September of the same year, he was named by English newspaper The Guardian as one of the best players born in 2005 worldwide.

=== KF Llapi ===
On 1 September 2024, it was announced that Almazbekov was transferred to KF Llapi of the Kosovo Superleague. The player then signed a three-year contract with the club.

=== Rukh Lviv ===
In February 2025, Almazbekov departed Llapi and joined Ukrainian First League club FC Rukh Lviv.

=== FK Liepāja ===
Almazbekov joined FK Liepāja of the Latvian Higher League during the summer 2026 transfer window.

== International career ==
Almazbekov has represented Kyrgyzstan at youth international level. In May 2022, he was called up to the senior national team for 2023 AFC Asian Cup qualification matches.

== Personal life ==
Almazbekov has named former Galatasaray player Wesley Sneijder as an inspiration to him.

== Career statistics ==
=== International ===
As of matches played 9 June 2026.

Appearances and goals by national team and year
National team	Year	Apps	Goals
Kyrgyzstan	2022	1	0
2023	3	0	
2024	11	0	
2025	2	0	
2026	4	1	
Total		21	1

== International goals ==
Scores and results list Kyrgyzstan's goal tally first.

No.	Date	Venue	Opponent	Score	Result	Competition
1.	27 March 2026	Calista Sports Center, Belek, Türkiye	Madagascar	1–4	2–5	Friendly

== Honours ==
Galatasaray

- Süper Lig: 2022–23
