= 2023 CAFA U-17 Championship =

CAFA U-17 Championship 2023
Tournament details
- Host country: Tajikistan
- City: Hisor
- Dates: 18–28 August
- Teams: 5 (from 1 sub-confederation)
- Venue: 1 (in 1 host city)

Final positions
- Champions: Tajikistan (1st title)
- Runners-up: Uzbekistan
- Third place: Afghanistan
- Fourth place: Iran

Tournament statistics
- Matches played: 10
- Goals scored: 34 (3.4 per match)
- Attendance: 12,114 (1,211 per match)
- Top scorer(s): (Iran) Ehsan Balouch Shahbakhsh (Tajikistan) Muhammad Nazriev (Uzbekistan) Nurbek Sarsenbaev (3 goals each)
- Best player: (Tajikistan) Muhammad Nazriev
- Fair play award: Tajikistan

The 2023 CAFA U-17 Championship was the inaugural edition of CAFA U-17 Championship, the international youth football championship organized by Central Asian Football Association for the men's under-17 national teams of Central Asia. The tournament was held from August 18th to 28th in Hisor, Tajikistan. During the eight-day round-robin event, five nations competed for the title, each playing once before the final matchday on August 27th.

Host Tajikistan became the first champions of the tournament after finishing at the top of the standings.

== Participating teams ==
A total of 5 (out of 6) CAFA member associations entered the tournament. Uzbekistan participated with its under-15 team instead.

Team	Appearance	Previous best performance
Afghanistan	1st	—N/a
Iran	1st	—N/a
Kyrgyz Republic	1st	—N/a
Tajikistan	1st	—N/a
Uzbekistan	1st	—N/a

Did not enter

- Turkmenistan

== Venues ==
All Matches were held at the Hisor Central Stadium.

Hisor	2023 CAFA U-17 Championship (Tajikistan)
Hisor Central Stadium	2023 CAFA U-17 Championship (Tajikistan)
Capacity: 20,000	2023 CAFA U-17 Championship (Tajikistan)

== Match officials ==
CAFA selected the following referees to officiate the tournament:

Referees

- (Kyrgyzstan) Mederbek Taichiev
- (Tajikistan) Abdullo Davalatov
- (Turkmenistan) Arslan Goşanow
- (Uzbekistan) Asker Nadjafaliev

Assistant referees

- (Iran) Danial Bashandehnaeni
- (Kyrgyzstan) Khusan Dzhalaldinov
- (Tajikistan) Ismoil Nuraliev
- (Turkmenistan) Palvan Palvanow
- (Uzbekistan) Avazbek Abdullaev

== Main tournament ==
The main tournament schedule was announced on 18 August 2023.

Pos	Team	Pld	W	D	L	GF	GA	GD	Pts	Final result
1	Tajikistan (H)	4	3	0	1	9	3	+6	9	Champions
2	Uzbekistan	4	3	0	1	8	3	+5	9	Runners-up
3	Afghanistan	4	2	0	2	6	7	−1	6 (Note: Head-to-head points: Afghanistan 3, Iran 0)	Third place
4	Iran	4	2	0	2	10	5	+5	6	
5	Kyrgyz Republic	4	0	0	4	1	16	−15	0	

Source: CAFA
Rules for classification: 1) Points; 2) head-to-head matches; 3) Goal difference; 4) Number of goals scored.
(H) Hosts
Notes:
20 August 2023
18:00

Kyrgyz Republic	0–3	Afghanistan
	Report	Shirzai 30'; Ahmadi 32'; Safi 47'

Hisor Central Stadium, Hisor
Attendance: 85
Referee: Arslan Goşanow (Turkmenistan)
20 August 2023
21:00

Uzbekistan	3–1	Iran
Rustamov 41'; Sarsenbaev 78', 90+5'	Report	Zare 90+1'

Hisor Central Stadium, Hisor
Attendance: 153
Referee: Mederbek Taichiev (Kyrgyz Republic)

21 August 2023
18:00

Afghanistan	1–3	Tajikistan
Sarwari 2'	Report	Nazriev 34', 47'; Bobonazarov 41'

Hisor Central Stadium, Hisor
Attendance: 412
Referee: Asker Nadjafaliev (Uzbekistan)
21 August 2023
21:00

Kyrgyz Republic	0–2	Uzbekistan
	Report	Ramilov 28'; Sarsenbaev 61'

Hisor Central Stadium, Hisor
Attendance: 30
Referee: Abdullo Davlatov (Tajikistan)

23 August 2023
18:00

Iran	1–2	Afghanistan
Shafei 58'	Report	Sarwari 42'; Mahbobi 47'

Hisor Central Stadium, Hisor
Attendance: 135
Referee: Abdullo Davlatov (Tajikistan)
23 August 2023
21:00

Tajikistan	4–1	Kyrgyz Republic
Bobonazarov 69'; Davlyatzoda 74'; Sharipov 77'; Ormonov 90' (o.g.)	Report	Kanatov 23'

Hisor Central Stadium, Hisor
Attendance: 300
Referee: Arslan Goşanow (Turkmenistan)

25 August 2023
18:00

Iran	7–0	Kyrgyz Repbulic
Torabi 30' (pen.); Shahbakhsh 53', 73', 90+1'; Razi 59'; Kheradpisheh 65'; Momenikafshgari 81'	Report

Hisor Central Stadium, Hisor
Attendance: 241
Referee: Asker Nadjafaliev (Uzbekistan)
25 August 2023
21:00

Uzbekistan	0–2	Tajikistan
	Report	Davlyatzoda 19'; Nazriev 44'

Hisor Central Stadium, Hisor
Attendance: 5,200
Referee: Mederbek Taichiev (Kyrgyz Repbulic)

27 August 2023
18:00

Afghanistan	0–3	Uzbekistan
	Report	Fayzullaev 8'; Tulaganmirzaev 36'; Sodikov 90+4'

Hisor Central Stadium, Hisor
Attendance: 83
Referee: Abdullo Davalatov (Tajikistan)
27 August 2023
21:00

Tajikistan	0–1	Iran
	Report	Goudarzi 72'

Hisor Central Stadium, Hisor
Attendance: 5,475
Referee: Asker Nadjafaliev (Uzbekistan)

== Goalscorers ==
There were 34 goals scored in 10 matches, for an average of 3.4 goals per match (as of 27 August 2023).

3 goals

- (Iran) Ehsan Balouch Shahbakhsh
- (Tajikistan) Muhammad Nazriev
- (Uzbekistan) Nurbek Sarsenbaev

2 goals

- (Afghanistan) Sahil Sarwari
- (Tajikistan) Idris Davlyatzoda
- (Tajikistan) Parviz Bobonazarov

1 goal

- (Afghanistan) Mohammed Waris Shirzai
- (Afghanistan) Arash Ahmadi
- (Afghanistan) Yaser Safi
- (Afghanistan) Nawid Mahbobi
- (Iran) Abdollah Zare
- (Iran) Kourosh Shafei
- (Iran) Ashkan Torabi
- (Iran) Vihan Razi
- (Iran) Ehsan Kheradpisheh
- (Iran) Mohammadhossein Momenikafshgari
- (Iran) Mohammadreza Goudarzi
- (Kyrgyzstan) Kairat Kanatov
- (Tajikistan) Firuzjon Sharipov
- (Uzbekistan) Asadbek Ramilov
- (Uzbekistan) Jamshidbek Rustamov
- (Uzbekistan) Mukhammadyusuf Fayzullaev
- (Uzbekistan) Sardorbek Tulaganmirzaev
- (Uzbekistan) Sayfiddin Sodikov

1 own goal

- (Kyrgyzstan) Zhanbolot Ormonov (against Tajikistan)

Source: CAFA

== Player awards ==
The following awards were given at the conclusion of the tournament:
The ranking for the Top Goalscorer was determined using the following criteria: goals, assists and fewest minutes played.

Top Goalscorer	Best player	Fair Play award	Special award
(Uzbekistan) Nurbek Sarsenbaev (3 goals)	(Tajikistan) Mohammad Nazriev	Tajikistan	Iran
