= Amir Ebrahimzadeh =

Iranian footballer (born 2004)

Personal information
- Date of birth: 1 January 2004 (age 22)
- Place of birth: Tabriz, Iran
- Height: 1.88 m (6 ft 2 in)
- Position: Forward

Team information
- Current team: Shafa Baku
- Number: 99

Youth career
- –2021: Tractor

Senior career*
Years	Team	Apps	(Gls)
2021–2024	Tractor	4	(1)
2024–2025	Aluminium Arak	3	(0)
2025–	Shafa Baku		

International career^{‡}
2021	Iran U17	1	(0)
2022–2023	Iran U20	8	(7)
- * Club domestic league appearances and goals as of 2 January 2025 ‡ National team caps and goals as of 7 March 2023

Amir Ebrahimzadeh (Persian: امیر ابراهیم‌زاده; born 31 January 2004) is an Iranian professional footballer who plays as a forward for Azerbaijan Premier League club Shafa Baku.

== Career ==
Ebrahimzadeh made his debut for Tractor in first fixtures of 2021–22 Persian Gulf Pro League against Gol Gohar while he substituted in for Mohammad Moslemipour.

== Career statistics ==
Club	Season	League			Cup		Continental		Total	
Club	Season	League	Apps	Goals	Apps	Goals	Apps	Goals	Apps	Goals
Tractor	2021-22	Persian Gulf Pro League	1	0	0	0	0	0	1	0
Tractor	2022-23	Persian Gulf Pro League	1	0	0	0	0	0	1	0
Tractor	2023-24	Persian Gulf Pro League	0	0	0	0	0	0	0	0
Career total			2	0	0	0	0	0	2	0
