= Zeng Yaozhang =

Chinese footballer (born 2004)

Personal information
- Date of birth: 14 July 2004 (age 22)
- Place of birth: Guangzhou, Guangdong, China
- Height: 1.75 m (5 ft 9 in)
- Position: Forward

Team information
- Current team: Guangzhou
- Number: 16

Youth career
- 2015–2022: Evergrande Football School

Senior career*
Years	Team	Apps	(Gls)
2022–	Guangzhou	2	(0)

International career
2019	China U16	4	(5)
- * Club domestic league appearances and goals as of 14:01, 31 January 2023 (UTC)

Zeng Yaozhang (Chinese: 曾耀樟; born 14 July 2004) is a Chinese footballer currently playing as a forward for Guangzhou.

== Club career ==
Born in Guangzhou, Guangdong, Zeng played for the Evergrande Football School, studying abroad in Spain in 2017. Since joining the first-team squad of Guangzhou, he has been tipped to become one of the club's best players.

== International career ==
Zeng has represented China at under-16 level.

== Career statistics ==
=== Club ===
As of 31 January 2023.

Appearances and goals by club, season and competition
Club	Season	League			Cup		Continental		Other		Total	
Club	Season	Division	Apps	Goals	Apps	Goals	Apps	Goals	Apps	Goals	Apps	Goals
Guangzhou	2022	Chinese Super League	2	0	0	0	0	0	0	0	2	0
Career total			2	0	0	0	0	0	0	0	2	0
