= Shahid Hajibabaei Stadium =

Football stadium in Hamedan, Iran

- Maryanaj Stadium
- Location: Hamedan, Iran
- Capacity: 10,000
- Surface: Grass

Construction
- Groundbreaking: 2009
- Opened: September 16, 2012

Shahid Hajibabaei Stadium, is a Football Stadium located in Hamedan, Iran. It was opened on September 16, 2012 and has an all-seater seating capacity of 10,000. This stadium was one of the hosts of the 2014 AFC U-14 Championship.
