= He Xiaoke =

Chinese football player (born 2004)

Personal information
- Date of birth: 24 January 2004 (age 22)
- Place of birth: Beijing, China
- Height: 1.76 m (5 ft 9 in)
- Position: Forward

Youth career
- 2014–2022: Shandong Taishan
- 2020: → Red Star Belgrade (loan)
- 2021–2022: → Sabadell (loan)

Senior career*
Years	Team	Apps	(Gls)
2022–2023	Shandong Taishan	0	(0)
2022	→ Sabadell B (loan)	1	(0)
2022–2023	→ Sabadell (loan)	1	(0)
2023	→ Andorra (loan)	1	(0)
2024	Andorra	0	(0)
2024	→ San Cristóbal (loan)	5	(0)
2024	Shandong Taishan	2	(0)
2025–	Qingdao West Coast	1	(0)
2025	→ Henan FC (loan)	3	(0)

International career
2018–2020	China U16		
2021–2022	China U19		
2024	China U21		
- * Club domestic league appearances and goals as of 28 August 2025

He Xiaoke (Chinese: 何小珂; born 24 January 2004) is a Chinese professional footballer who plays as a forward.

== Club career ==
Born in Beijing, China, He first trialled at the academy of Shandong Taishan at the age of six, also trialling with Ghuangzou before joining Shandong Taishan at the age of ten. A short stint with Serbian side Red Star Belgrade followed in 2020, but due to the COVID-19 pandemic, he returned to China.

In September 2021, he joined Spanish side Sabadell. He made his debut in the Primera Federación on 18 December 2022, coming on as a substitute for David Astals as Sabadell lost 2–0 to Osasuna B.

In August 2023, he joined FC Andorra, signing a four-year contract.

== International career ==
He has represented China from under-14 to under-19 level, captaining the under-15, under-16 and under-18 sides. He was called up to the under-19 side for the first time in July 2022.

== Career statistics ==
=== Club ===
As of 29 December 2022.

Club	Season	League			Cup		Other		Total	
Club	Season	Division	Apps	Goals	Apps	Goals	Apps	Goals	Apps	Goals
Sabadell B	2021–22	Segona Catalana	1	0	–		0	0	1	0
Sabadell	2022–23	Primera Federación	1	0	0	0	0	0	1	0
FC Andorra	2023–24	Segunda División	0	0	0	0	0	0	0	0
Career total			2	0	0	0	0	0	2	0
