= Afghanistan national under-17 football team =

National association football team

Afghanistan Under-17
- Association: Afghanistan Football Federation (AFF)
- Confederation: AFC (Asia)
- FIFA code: AFG

AFC U-17 Asian Cup
- Appearances: 3 (first in 2018)
- Best result: Group stage (2018, 2023, 2025)

CAFA U-17 Championship
- Appearances: 3 (first in 2023)
- Best result: Champions (2024)

The Afghanistan national under-17 football team is controlled by the Afghanistan Football Federation and represents Afghanistan in international football competitions at this age.

== Competitive record ==
=== FIFA U-17 World Cup ===
FIFA U-17 World Cup record
Year	Round	Position	Pld	W	D	L	GF	GA	Squad
(China) 1985	Did not qualify								
(Canada) 1987	Did not qualify								
(Scotland) 1989	Did not qualify								
(Italy) 1991	Did not qualify								
(Japan) 1993	Did not qualify								
(Ecuador) 1995	Did not qualify								
(Egypt) 1997	Did not qualify								
(New Zealand) 1999	Did not qualify								
(Trinidad and Tobago) 2001	Did not qualify								
(Finland) 2003	Did not qualify								
(Peru) 2005	Did not qualify								
(South Korea) 2007	Did not qualify								
(Nigeria) 2009	Did not qualify								
(Mexico) 2011	Did not qualify								
(United Arab Emirates) 2013	Did not qualify								
(Chile) 2015	Did not qualify								
(India) 2017	Did not qualify								
(Brazil) 2019	Did not qualify								
(Indonesia) 2023	Did not qualify								
(Qatar) 2025	Did not qualify								
(Qatar) 2026	Did not qualify								
(Qatar) 2027	To be determined								
(Qatar) 2028	To be determined								
(Qatar) 2029	To be determined								
Total	—	0/20	0	0	0	0	0	0	—

=== AFC U-17 Asian Cup ===
AFC U-17 Asian Cup record										Qualification record					
Year	Round	Position	Pld	W	D	L	GF	GA	Squad	Pld	W	D	L	GF	GA
(Qatar) 1985	Did not enter									Did not enter					
(Qatar) 1986	Did not enter									Did not enter					
(Thailand) 1988	Did not enter									Did not enter					
(United Arab Emirates) 1990	Did not enter									Did not enter					
(Saudi Arabia) 1992	Did not enter									Did not enter					
(Qatar) 1994	Did not enter									Did not enter					
(Thailand) 1996	Did not enter									Did not enter					
(Qatar) 1998	Did not enter									Did not enter					
(Vietnam) 2000	Did not enter									Did not enter					
(United Arab Emirates) 2002	Did not enter									Did not enter					
(Japan) 2004	Did not qualify									2	0	0	2	0	6
(Singapore) 2006	Did not enter									Did not enter					
(Uzbekistan) 2008	Withdrew									Withdrew					
(Uzbekistan) 2010	Did not qualify									4	0	1	3	1	12
(Iran) 2012	Disqualified									5	1	0	4	10	12
(Thailand) 2014	Did not qualify									3	1	0	2	2	6
(India) 2016	Did not qualify									2	0	1	1	2	3
(Malaysia) 2018	Group stage		3	0	0	3	1	13	Squad	4	3	0	1	11	4
(Thailand) 2023	Group stage		3	1	0	2	3	11	Squad	2	1	0	1	5	2
(Saudi Arabia) 2025	Group stage		3	0	0	3	0	10	Squad	4	4	0	0	23	3
(Saudi Arabia) 2026	Did not qualify									4	1	0	3	4	10
Total	Group stage	3/20	9	1	0	8	4	34	—	30	11	2	17	58	58
