= Turkmenistan national under-17 football team =

National association football team

The Turkmenistan national under-17 football team is the under-17 football (soccer) team of Turkmenistan and is controlled by the Football Federation of Turkmenistan.

== Players ==
=== Current Squad ===
The following 23 players were selected for the most recent fixtures in the 2026 AFC U-17 Asian Cup qualification.

No.	Pos.	Player	Date of birth (age)	Club
1	GK	Gokbatyr Myradov		
16	GK	Azim Abayev		
22	GK	Yunus Syyayev		
2	DF	Dovlet Muhammedov		
3	DF	Didar Hamragulyyev		
4	DF	Ovezmyrat Ovezmyrado		
5	DF	Resul Meredov		
6	DF	Timur Pastushenko		
15	DF	Begmuhammet Shirmuhammedov		
17	DF	Hajymuhammet Durdykakayev	23 June 2009 (age 17)	(Football Federation of Turkmenistan) Altyn Tach
18	DF	Soltanmyrat Hezretgulyyev		
20	DF	Achylmuhammet Dovletov		
7	MF	Hudaynazar Meredov	1 February 2010 (age 16)	(Football Federation of Turkmenistan) Altyn Tach
8	MF	Medet Muhammetmyradov	2 May 2010 (age 16)	(Football Federation of Turkmenistan) Altyn Tach
9	MF	Shamyrat Shamyradov		
11	MF	Suleymannazar Govshudov (captain)	10 January 2009 (age 17)	(Football Federation of Turkmenistan) FK Diýar
13	MF	Ismail Klychev		
14	MF	Aymyrat Hajyyev		
19	MF	Aydyn Jumayev		
21	MF	Orazmuhammet Ovekov		
23	MF	Dastan Zhumaniyazov		
12	FW	Davut Tejenov		
10	FW	Amanmyrat Charyyev		

== Competitive record ==
=== FIFA U-17 World Cup record ===
For 1985 to 1991 see Soviet Union national under-16 football team.

FIFA U-17 World Cup
Year	Round	PLD	W	D*	L	GS	GA
(Japan) 1993	Did not enter	-	-	-	-	-	-
(Ecuador) 1995	Did not enter	-	-	-	-	-	-
(Egypt) 1997	Did not enter	-	-	-	-	-	-
(New Zealand) 1999	Did not qualify	-	-	-	-	-	-
(Trinidad and Tobago) 2001	Did not qualify	-	-	-	-	-	-
(Finland) 2003	Did not qualify	-	-	-	-	-	-
(Peru) 2005	Did not qualify	-	-	-	-	-	-
(South Korea) 2007	Did not qualify	-	-	-	-	-	-
(Nigeria) 2009	Did not qualify	-	-	-	-	-	-
(Mexico) 2011	Did not qualify	-	-	-	-	-	-
(United Arab Emirates) 2013	Did not enter	-	-	-	-	-	-
(Chile) 2015	Did not qualify	-	-	-	-	-	-
(India) 2017	Did not qualify	-	-	-	-	-	-
(Brazil) 2019	Did not enter	-	-	-	-	-	-
(Indonesia) 2023	Did not qualify	-	-	-	-	-	-
(Qatar) 2025	Did not qualify	-	-	-	-	-	-
(Qatar) 2026	Did not qualify	-	-	-	-	-	-
(Qatar) 2027	Withdrew	-	-	-	-	-	-
Total							

*Denotes draws including knockout matches decided on penalty kicks.

=== AFC U-17 Asian Cup ===
Year	Round	PLD	W	D*	L	GS	GA
(Saudi Arabia) 1992	Did not enter	-	-	-	-	-	-
(Qatar) 1994	Did not enter	-	-	-	-	-	-
(Thailand) 1996	Did not enter	-	-	-	-	-	-
(Qatar) 1998	Did not qualify	-	-	-	-	-	-
(Vietnam) 2000	Did not qualify	-	-	-	-	-	-
(United Arab Emirates) 2002	Did not qualify	-	-	-	-	-	-
(Japan) 2004	Did not qualify	-	-	-	-	-	-
(Singapore) 2006	Did not qualify	-	-	-	-	-	-
(Uzbekistan) 2008	Round 1	3	0	0	3	1	12
(Uzbekistan) 2010	Did not qualify	-	-	-	-	-	-
(Iran) 2012	Did not enter	-	-	-	-	-	-
(Thailand) 2014	Did not qualify	-	-	-	-	-	-
(India) 2016	Did not qualify	-	-	-	-	-	-
(Malaysia) 2018	Withdrew	-	-	-	-	-	-
(Thailand) 2023	Did not qualify	-	-	-	-	-	-
(Saudi Arabia) 2025	Did not qualify	-	-	-	-	-	-
(Saudi Arabia) 2026	Did not qualify	-	-	-	-	-	-
(Uzbekistan) 2027	Withdrew	-	-	-	-	-	-
Total		3	0	0	3	1	12

== Head-to-head record ==
The following table shows Turkmenistan's head-to-head record in the AFC U-17 Asian Cup.

Opponent	Pld	W	D	L	GF	GA	GD	Win %
Australia	1	0	0	1	0	6	−6	0.00
China	1	0	0	1	1	2	−1	0.00
Saudi Arabia	1	0	0	1	0	4	−4	0.00
Total	3	0	0	3	1	12	−11	0.00
