= Tajikistan national under-17 football team =

National association football team

Tajikistan Under-17
- Association: Tajikistan National Football Federation
- Confederation: AFC (Asia)
- Head coach: (San Marino) Marco Ragini
- FIFA code: TJK
First colours	Second colours

Biggest win
- Tajikistan 33–0 Guam (Bishan, Singapore; 23 October 2024)

FIFA U-17 World Cup
- Appearances: 3 (first in 2007)
- Best result: Round of 16 (2007)

AFC U-17 Asian Cup
- Appearances: 5 (first in 2006)
- Best result: Runners-up (2018)

The Tajikistan national under-17 football team is controlled by the Tajikistan National Football Federation and represents Tajikistan in international under-17 football competitions.

== Current squad ==
The following players were called up for the 2025 AFC U-17 Asian Cup between 3 and 20 April 2025.

Caps and goals correct as of 5 April 2025, after the match against Oman.

No.	Pos.	Player	Date of birth (age)	Caps	Goals	Club
1	GK	Mukhammadrakhim Rakhmonov	3 January 2009 (age 17)	0	0	(Tajikistan Football Federation) RShVSM Dushanbe
16	GK	Anushervon Kurbonzoda	11 January 2008 (age 18)	0	0	(Tajikistan Football Federation) Dushanbe-83
23	GK	Abubakr Rakhmonkulov	5 September 2008 (age 18)	8	0	(Tajikistan Football Federation) Sarkhadchi Khamadoni
2	DF	Abdusamad Melikmurodov	24 June 2008 (age 18)	7	1	(Tajikistan Football Federation) Dushanbe-83
4	DF	Mekhrozhiddin Rozikov	10 December 2008 (age 17)	6	1	(Tajikistan Football Federation) Dushanbe-83
5	DF	Mustafo Khasanbekov	29 January 2009 (age 17)	8	0	(Tajikistan Football Federation) Istiklol
8	DF	Akhmadzhon Shoev	1 August 2008 (age 18)	8	0	(Tajikistan Football Federation) Istiklol
11	DF	Zarif Zarifzoda	13 November 2008 (age 18)	7	1	(Tajikistan Football Federation) Dushanbe-83
12	DF	Shukhrat Nurmatov	13 May 2010 (age 16)	0	0	Unknown
14	DF	Muboriz Miskinshoev	23 February 2008 (age 18)	4	0	(Tajikistan Football Federation) Istiklol
3	MF	Sadriddin Sattorov	15 June 2009 (age 17)	2	0	(Tajikistan Football Federation) Dushanbe-83
6	MF	Bakhodur Nazarzoda	15 September 2008 (age 18)	6	0	(Tajikistan Football Federation) Dushanbe-83
9	MF	Abdullo Ibragimzoda	20 October 2008 (age 18)	7	0	(Tajikistan Football Federation) Dushanbe-83
10	MF	Ramazon Bakhtaliev	24 October 2008 (age 18)	6	0	(Tajikistan Football Federation) Istiklol
13	MF	Parviz Bobonazarov	4 January 2000 (age 26)	7	2	(Tajikistan Football Federation) Istiklol
15	MF	Abdukayum Fuzaylov	14 November 2008 (age 18)	0	0	(Tajikistan Football Federation) Istiklol
18	MF	Umed Jafoev	10 October 2008 (age 18)	6	3	Unknown
19	MF	Furkon Rakhimzoda	25 August 2009 (age 17)	2	0	(Tajikistan Football Federation) Dushanbe-83
20	MF	Khaydarsho Khudoydodov	1 January 2008 (age 18)	6	3	(Tajikistan Football Federation) Eskhata
21	MF	Mekhrubon Odilzoda	15 September 2009 (age 17)	4	0	(Tajikistan Football Federation) Istiklol
22	MF	David Maksudov	15 May 2008 (age 18)	5	1	(Tajikistan Football Federation) Mokhir
7	FW	Mukhammad Nazriev	23 October 2008 (age 18)	7	17	(Tajikistan Football Federation) Istiklol
17	FW	Nazrullo Ashuralizoda	5 July 2008 (age 18)	8	9	(Tajikistan Football Federation) Dushanbe-83

== Competitive record ==
=== FIFA U-17 World Cup ===
Year	Result	Pld	W	D	L	GF	GA
(China) 1985	Part of the Soviet Union						
(Canada) 1987	Part of the Soviet Union						
(Scotland) 1989	Part of the Soviet Union						
(Italy) 1991	Part of the Soviet Union						
(Japan) 1993	Did not enter						
(Ecuador) 1995	Did not enter						
(Egypt) 1997	Did not enter						
(New Zealand) 1999	Did not qualify						
(Trinidad and Tobago) 2001	Did not qualify						
(Finland) 2003	Did not qualify						
(Peru) 2005	Did not qualify						
(South Korea) 2007	Round of 16	4	1	1	2	5	6
(Nigeria) 2009	Did not qualify						
(Mexico) 2011	Did not qualify						
(United Arab Emirates) 2013	Did not qualify						
(Chile) 2015	Did not qualify						
(India) 2017	Did not qualify						
(Brazil) 2019	Group stage	3	1	0	2	3	8
(Indonesia) 2023	Did not qualify						
(Qatar) 2025	Group stage	3	0	0	3	2	10
(Qatar) 2026	In progress	1	1	0	0	5	3
(Qatar) 2027	To be determined						
(Qatar) 2028	To be determined						
(Qatar) 2029	To be determined						
Total:4/24	Round of 16	11	3	1	7	15	27

=== AFC U-17 Asian Cup ===
Year	Round	P	W	D	L	GS	GA
(Qatar) 1985	Part of the Soviet Union						
(Qatar) 1986	Part of the Soviet Union						
(Thailand) 1988	Part of the Soviet Union						
(United Arab Emirates) 1990	Part of the Soviet Union						
(Saudi Arabia) 1992	Did not enter						
(Qatar) 1994	Did not enter						
(Thailand) 1996	Did not enter						
(Qatar) 1998	Did not qualify						
(Vietnam) 2000	Did not qualify						
(United Arab Emirates) 2002	Suspended						
(Japan) 2004	Did not qualify						
(Singapore) 2006	Third place	6	4	1	1	11	10
(Uzbekistan) 2008	Disqualified						
(Uzbekistan) 2010	Group stage	3	0	1	2	3	13
(Iran) 2012	Did not qualify						
(Thailand) 2014	Did not qualify						
(India) 2016	Did not qualify						
(Malaysia) 2018	Runners-up	6	1	3	2	6	10
(Thailand) 2023	Group stage	3	0	1	2	1	5
(Saudi Arabia) 2025	Quarter-finals	4	2	1	1	7	7
(Saudi Arabia) 2026	Quarter-finals	4	2	1	1	8	10
(Uzbekistan) 2027	Qualified						
(Saudi Arabia) 2028	To be determined						
(Saudi Arabia) 2029	To be determined						
Total:7/24	Runners-up	26	9	8	9	36	55

== Head-to-head record ==
The following table shows Tajikistan's head-to-head record in the FIFA U-17 World Cup and AFC U-17 Asian Cup.

=== In FIFA U-17 World Cup ===
Opponent	Pld	W	D	L	GF	GA	GD	Win %
Argentina	1	0	0	1	1	3	−2	0.00
Belgium	1	0	0	1	0	1	−1	0.00
Burkina Faso	1	0	0	1	0	2	−2	0.00
Cameroon	1	1	0	0	1	0	+1	100.00
Croatia					—			
Cuba	1	1	0	0	5	3	+2	100.00
Czech Republic	1	0	0	1	1	6	−5	0.00
Peru	1	0	1	0	1	1	+0	0.00
Senegal					—			
Spain	1	0	0	1	1	5	−4	0.00
Tunisia	1	0	0	1	0	1	−1	0.00
United States	2	1	0	1	5	5	+0	50.00
Total	11	3	1	7	15	27	−12	27.27

=== In AFC U-17 Asian Cup ===
Opponent	Pld	W	D	L	GF	GA	GD	Win %
Australia	1	0	0	1	0	2	−2	0.00
China	1	0	1	0	1	1	+0	0.00
India	1	0	0	1	1	4	−3	0.00
Iran	2	2	0	0	5	2	+3	100.00
Iraq	1	1	0	0	1	0	+1	100.00
Japan	3	0	1	2	0	6	−6	0.00
Jordan	1	0	1	0	1	1	+0	0.00
Malaysia	1	0	0	1	2	6	−4	0.00
Myanmar	1	1	0	0	1	0	+1	100.00
North Korea	3	0	1	2	1	7	−6	0.00
Oman	1	1	0	0	2	1	+1	100.00
Saudi Arabia	2	0	1	1	5	7	−2	0.00
South Korea	3	1	2	0	4	3	+1	33.33
Syria	1	0	1	0	3	3	+0	0.00
Thailand	2	2	0	0	4	1	+3	100.00
Uzbekistan	1	0	0	1	1	8	−7	0.00
Yemen	1	1	0	0	4	3	+1	100.00
Total	26	9	8	9	36	55	−19	34.62

== Past competition rosters ==
=== FIFA U-17 World Cup rosters ===
- 2007 FIFA U-17 World Cup
- 2019 FIFA U-17 World Cup
