= 2020 AFC U-16 Championship =

بطولة آسيا تحت 16 سنة 2020

Tournament details
- Host country: Bahrain
- Dates: Cancelled
- Teams: 16 (from 1 confederation)
- Venue: 3 (in 3 host cities)

The 2020 AFC U-16 Championship would have been the 19th edition of the AFC U-16 Championship, the biennial international youth football championship organised by the Asian Football Confederation (AFC) for the men's under-16 national teams of Asia. It was scheduled to take place in Bahrain, who had been appointed as the host by the AFC on 17 September 2019. It was originally scheduled between 16 September and 3 October 2020, but was postponed twice due to the COVID-19 pandemic.

The AFC announced the cancellation of the tournament on 25 January 2021, leaving the hosting rights for the 2023 AFC U-17 Asian Cup with Bahrain.

Originally, the top four teams of the tournament would have qualified for the 2021 FIFA U-17 World Cup in Peru as the AFC representatives. Due to the ongoing COVID-19 Pandemic, the 2021 U-17 World Cup was also cancelled, with hosting rights for the 2023 FIFA U-17 World Cup still with Peru.

This edition was expected to be the last to be played as an under-16 tournament, as the AFC have proposed switching the tournament from under-16 to under-17 starting from 2023.

Japan were the defending champions.

== Qualification ==
Qualifying was played from 14 – 22 September 2019. Bahrain also participated in the qualifiers, even though they had already qualified automatically as hosts.

=== Qualified teams ===
The following 16 teams qualified for the final tournament.

| Team | Qualified as | Appearance | Previous best performance |
|---|---|---|---|
| Bahrain | Hosts | 8th | Runners-up (1988) |
| Tajikistan | Group A winners | 4th | Runners-up (2018) |
| India | Group B winners | 9th | Quarter-finals (2002, 2018) |
| Iran | Group C winners | 12th | Champions (2008) |
| Saudi Arabia | Group D winners | 11th | Champions (1985, 1988) |
| Qatar | Group E winners | 11th | Champions (1990) |
| United Arab Emirates | Group F winners | 8th | Runners-up (1990) |
| China | Group G winners | 15th | Champions (1992, 2004) |
| Australia | Group H winners | 7th | Semi-finals (2010, 2014, 2018) |
| North Korea | Group I winners | 12th | Champions (2010, 2014) |
| Japan | Group J winners | 16th | Champions (1994, 2006, 2018) |
| South Korea | Group K winners | 15th | Champions (1986, 2002) |
| Yemen | 1st best runners-up | 6th | Runners-up (2002) |
| Indonesia | 2nd best runners-up | 7th | Fourth place (1990) |
| Uzbekistan | 3rd best runners-up | 10th | Champions (2012) |
| Oman | 4th best runners-up | 11th | Champions (1996, 2000) |

== Draw ==
The draw of the final tournament was held on 18 June 2020, 14:30 MYT (UTC+8), at the AFC House in Kuala Lumpur. The 16 teams were drawn into four groups of four teams. The teams were seeded according to their performance in the 2018 AFC U-16 Championship final tournament and qualification, with the hosts Bahrain automatically seeded and assigned to Position A1 in the draw.

| Pot 1 | Pot 2 | Pot 3 | Pot 4 |
|---|---|---|---|
| 1. Bahrain (hosts); 2. Japan; 3. Tajikistan; 4. South Korea | 5. Australia; 6. North Korea; 7. Indonesia; 8. Oman | 9. India; 10. Iran; 11. Yemen; 12. Saudi Arabia | 13. China; 14. Uzbekistan; 15. Qatar; 16. United Arab Emirates |

Final Draw (prior to the tournament's cancellation)
| Group A | Bahrain | North Korea | Iran | Qatar |
| Group B | Tajikistan | Oman | Yemen | United Arab Emirates |
| Group C | South Korea | Australia | India | Uzbekistan |
| Group D | Japan | Indonesia | Saudi Arabia | China |
