= GFF U-17 Gulf Cup =

- Founded: 2001
- Teams: 8
- Current champions: Egypt (1st title)
- Most championships: Saudi Arabia (6 titles)
- Website: the-gff.com
- 2026 GFF U-17 Gulf Cup

The GFF U-17 Gulf Cup (Arabic: كأس الخليج تحت 17 عامًا), formerly known as the GCC U-17 Championship, is a regional football competition governed by the Gulf Football Federation (GFF). The tournament was founded by the Gulf Cooperation Council (GCC) and was first organised in 2001 as a round-robin tournament of five nations. The last edition organised by the GCC was in 2016.

The tournament was relaunched by the AGCFF (now known as the GFF) in 2025, featuring eight teams.

== Records ==
The 2014 edition had been moved from Qatar to Bahrain, but was later cancelled in whole.

Season	Host	Winner	Score	Runner-up
GCC U-17 Championship
2001	Bahrain	Oman	RR	Saudi Arabia
2002	Saudi Arabia	Oman	RR	Saudi Arabia
2003	Qatar	Saudi Arabia	RR	Qatar
2006	Saudi Arabia	United Arab Emirates	RR	Saudi Arabia
2008	Saudi Arabia	Saudi Arabia	RR	United Arab Emirates
2009	United Arab Emirates	United Arab Emirates	1–1 (4–2 pen.)	Saudi Arabia
2010	Kuwait	United Arab Emirates	2–1	Saudi Arabia
2011	Qatar	Saudi Arabia	2–2 (4–3 pen.)	Qatar
2012	Kuwait	Saudi Arabia	1–0	Qatar
2013	Qatar	United Arab Emirates	2–2 (3–0 pen.)	Oman
2015	Qatar	Oman	0–0 (5–3 pen.)	Saudi Arabia
2016	Qatar	Saudi Arabia	RR	Oman
AGCFF U-17 Gulf Cup
2025	Qatar	Saudi Arabia	2–0	United Arab Emirates
GFF U-17 Gulf Cup
2026	Qatar	Egypt	3–1	United Arab Emirates

== Performance by country ==
Nation	Champions	Runners-up
Saudi Arabia	6 (2003, 2008, 2011, 2012, 2016, 2025)	6 (2001, 2002, 2006, 2009, 2010, 2015)
United Arab Emirates	4 (2006, 2009, 2010, 2013)	3 (2008, 2025, 2026)
Oman	3 (2001, 2002, 2015)	2 (2013, 2016)
Egypt	1 (2026)	-
Qatar	-	3 (2003, 2011, 2012)

Goalzz

== See also ==
- Arabian Gulf Cup
