= United Arab Emirates national under-17 football team =

UAE Under-17
- Association: United Arab Emirates Football Association
- Confederation: AFC (Asia)
- Head coach: (United Arab Emirates) Majed Al Zaabi
- Captain: (United Arab Emirates) Khaled Anbar
- FIFA code: UAE
First colours	Second colours

FIFA U-17 World Cup
- Appearances: 4 (first in 1991)
- Best result: Round of 16 (2009)

AFC U-17 Asian Cup
- Appearances: 7 (first in 1990)
- Best result: Runners-up (1990)

GCC U-17 Championship
- Appearances: 10 (first in 2003)
- Best result: Champions (2006, 2009, 2010, 2013)

United Arab Emirates national under-17 football team
Medal record

GCC U-17 Championship
Gold medal – first place	2006 Saudi Arabia	Team
Gold medal – first place	2009 UAE	Team
Gold medal – first place	2010 Kuwait	Team
Gold medal – first place	2013 Qatar	Team
Silver medal – second place	2008 Saudi Arabia	Team
Bronze medal – third place	2003 Qatar	Team
Bronze medal – third place	2011 Qatar	Team
Bronze medal – third place	2012 Kuwait	Team
Bronze medal – third place	2016 Qatar	Team

United Arab Emirates national under-17 football team
Medal record

AFC U-17 Asian Cup
Silver medal – second place	1990 UAE	Team

United Arab Emirates national under-17 football team
Medal record

WAFF U-16 Championship
Silver medal – second place	2019 Palestine	Team

The United Arab Emirates national under-17 football team represents the United Arab Emirates in international under-17 football competitions and is controlled by the United Arab Emirates Football Association.

== Competition Records ==
=== GCC U-17 Championship Record ===
Year	Round	GP	W	D*	L	GS	GA
(Bahrain) 2001	Unknown	-	-	-	-	-	-
(Saudi Arabia) 2002	Unknown	-	-	-	-	-	-
(Qatar) 2003	Third place	5	3	0	2	17	8
(Saudi Arabia) 2006	Champions	5	4	1	0	13	1
(Saudi Arabia) 2008	Runners-up	3	2	0	1	6	3
(United Arab Emirates) 2009	Champions	4	4	0	0	10	1
(Kuwait) 2010	Champions	4	2	1	1	8	7
(Qatar) 2011	Third place	4	1	3	0	4	2
(Kuwait) 2012	Third place	4	2	0	2	8	5
(Qatar) 2013	Champions	4	2	2	0	9	5
(Qatar) 2015	Group stage	2	1	0	1	2	5
(Qatar) 2016	Third place	4	1	2	1	2	2
Total	10/12	39	22	9	8	79	39

=== FIFA U-17 World Cup ===
Year	Result	Pld	W	D	L	GF	GA
(China) 1985	Did not qualify						
(Canada) 1987	Did not qualify						
(Scotland) 1989	Did not qualify						
(Italy) 1991	Group stage	3	0	1	2	3	10
(Japan) 1993	Did not qualify						
(Ecuador) 1995	Did not qualify						
(Egypt) 1997	Did not qualify						
(New Zealand) 1999	Did not qualify						
(Trinidad and Tobago) 2001	Did not qualify						
(Finland) 2003	Did not qualify						
(Peru) 2005	Did not qualify						
(South Korea) 2007	Did not qualify						
(Nigeria) 2009	Round of 16	4	1	0	3	3	6
(Mexico) 2011	Did not qualify						
(United Arab Emirates) 2013	Group stage	3	0	0	3	2	10
(Chile) 2015	Did not qualify						
(India) 2017	Did not qualify						
(Brazil) 2019	Did not qualify						
(Indonesia) 2023	Did not qualify						
(Qatar) 2025	Group stage	3	0	1	2	1	9
(Qatar) 2026	Did not qualify						
(Qatar) 2027	Did not qualify						
(Qatar) 2028	To be determined						
(Qatar) 2029	To be determined						
Total:4/24	Round of 16	13	1	2	10	9	35

=== AFC U-17 Asian Cup ===
Year	Round	GP	W	D	L	GS	GA
(Qatar) 1985	did not qualify						
(Qatar) 1986	did not qualify						
(Thailand) 1988	did not qualify						
(United Arab Emirates) 1990	Runners-up	5	3	1	1	10	3
(Saudi Arabia) 1992	Group Stage	3	0	1	2	3	5
(Qatar) 1994	Group Stage	4	1	2	1	10	9
(Thailand) 1996	did not qualify						
(Qatar) 1998	did not qualify						
(Vietnam) 2000	did not qualify						
(United Arab Emirates) 2002	Quarter-Finals	4	1	1	2	5	7
(Japan) 2004	did not qualify						
(Singapore) 2006	did not qualify						
(Uzbekistan) 2008	Semi-finals	4	2	0	2	7	13
(Uzbekistan) 2010	Quarter-finals	4	1	2	1	5	5
(Iran) 2012	did not qualify						
(Thailand) 2014	did not qualify						
(India) 2016	Quarter-finals	4	2	1	1	7	5
(Malaysia) 2018	withdrew						
(Thailand) 2023	did not qualify						
(Saudi Arabia) 2025	Quarter-finals	4	1	1	2	5	8
(Saudi Arabia) 2026	Group Stage	3	0	1	2	5	7
(Uzbekistan) 2027	did not qualify						
Total:7/21	Runners-up	35	11	10	14	57	62

=== WAFF U-20 Championship ===
Year	Round	Pld	W	D	L	GF	GA
(Palestine) 2019	Runners-up	4	1	3	0	4	2
(Iraq) 2021	Group stage	3	0	1	2	1	4
(Saudi Arabia) 2024	Runners-up						
Total	3/3	7	1	4	2	5	6

- Red border color indicates tournament was held on home soil.

== Individual awards ==
All Emiratis players who have won many individual awards With the UAE Under-17.

GCC U-17 Championship

Year	Player	Award
(United Arab Emirates) 2009	Nasser Abdulla	Best Goalkeeper
(United Arab Emirates) 2008	Abdullah Essa	Top Goalscorers
(United Arab Emirates) 2006	Ahmed Khalil	Top Goalscorers
(United Arab Emirates) 2003	Mohammed Al Shehhi	Top Goalscorers

== Current staff ==
Position	Name
Head coach	(United Arab Emirates) Majed Al Zaabi
Assistant coach	(United Arab Emirates) Nawaf Aldarmaki
Assistant coach	(United Arab Emirates) Sulaiman Haji Alblooshi
Goalkeeping coach	(United Arab Emirates) Yousif Al-Zaabi
Fitness coach	(Romania) Bogdan Paravan
Scouting/Logistics Officer	(United Arab Emirates) Tharik abdul-Raheem
Team administrator	(United Arab Emirates) Esam Binsalmin
Doctor	(United Arab Emirates) Djamel Senoussi
Physiotherapist	(United Arab Emirates) Esam Al-Ali
Performance Analyst	(United Arab Emirates) Abdulla Al-Muqahwi

== Current squad ==
The following 23 players were called up for the 2025 AFC U-17 Asian Cup.

Head coach: (United Arab Emirates) Majed Al-Zaabi

No.	Pos.	Player	Date of birth (age)	Club
1	GK	Mayed Mohamed	31 January 2008 (age 18)	(United Arab Emirates Football Association) Al-Wahda
17	GK	Mohammed Nasser	11 February 2008 (age 18)	(United Arab Emirates Football Association) Al-Wasl
22	GK	Saeed Ali	18 April 2009 (age 17)	(United Arab Emirates Football Association) Sharjah
2	DF	Houd Saleh	3 November 2008 (age 18)	(United Arab Emirates Football Association) Al-Jazira
3	DF	Ahmed Ekramy	11 October 2008 (age 18)	(United Arab Emirates Football Association) Al-Jazira
5	DF	Suhail Al-Noubi	10 August 2008 (age 18)	(United Arab Emirates Football Association) Al-Nasr
12	DF	Fahad Khalil	25 January 2008 (age 18)	(United Arab Emirates Football Association) Al-Nasr
13	DF	Salem Esam	2 December 2008 (age 17)	(United Arab Emirates Football Association) Al-Wasl
14	DF	Humaid Ibrahim	24 January 2008 (age 18)	(United Arab Emirates Football Association) Sharjah
4	MF	Obaid Omran	23 January 2008 (age 18)	(United Arab Emirates Football Association) Sharjah
6	MF	Ibrahim Yousuf	27 May 2008 (age 18)	(United Arab Emirates Football Association) Al-Wasl
7	MF	Mohammed Gamal	3 August 2008 (age 18)	(United Arab Emirates Football Association) Al-Nasr
8	MF	Abdulla Rashed	12 March 2008 (age 18)	(United Arab Emirates Football Association) Al-Ain
18	MF	Ali Hassan	4 December 2008 (age 17)	(United Arab Emirates Football Association) Shabab Al-Ahli
19	MF	Mohammad Ahmad	31 March 2008 (age 18)	(United Arab Emirates Football Association) Shabab Al-Ahli
20	MF	Mohammad Salem	14 September 2008 (age 18)	(United Arab Emirates Football Association) Al-Nasr
21	MF	Abdalla Hatem	19 May 2008 (age 18)	(Egyptian Football Association) Al-Ahly
23	MF	Abdullah Mennad	2 October 2008 (age 18)	(United Arab Emirates Football Association) Sharjah
9	FW	Mayed Adel	21 January 2008 (age 18)	(United Arab Emirates Football Association) Al-Nasr
10	FW	Faysal Mohammed	3 September 2008 (age 18)	(United Arab Emirates Football Association) Al-Wahda
11	FW	Mohamed Buti	30 January 2008 (age 18)	(United Arab Emirates Football Association) Shabab Al-Ahli
15	FW	Jayden Adetiba	7 June 2009 (age 17)	(The Football Association) Arsenal
16	FW	Hazaa Faisal	10 February 2008 (age 18)	(United Arab Emirates Football Association) Al-Ain

== Former squads ==
- 1991 FIFA U-17 World Championship squads – UAE
- 2009 FIFA U-17 World Cup squads – UAE
- 2013 FIFA U-17 World Cup squads – UAE

== Head-to-head record ==
The following table shows United Arab Emirates' head-to-head record in the FIFA U-17 World Cup and AFC U-17 Asian Cup.

=== In FIFA U-17 World Cup ===
Opponent	Pld	W	D	L	GF	GA	GD	Win %
Brazil	2	0	0	2	1	10	−9	0.00
Costa Rica	1	0	1	0	1	1	+0	0.00
Croatia	1	0	0	1	0	3	−3	0.00
Germany	1	0	1	0	2	2	+0	0.00
Honduras	1	0	0	1	1	2	−1	0.00
Malawi	1	1	0	0	2	0	+2	100.00
Senegal	1	0	0	1	0	5	−5	0.00
Slovakia	1	0	0	1	0	2	−2	0.00
Spain	1	0	0	1	1	3	−2	0.00
Sudan	1	0	0	1	1	4	−3	0.00
Turkey	1	0	0	1	0	2	−2	0.00
United States	1	0	0	1	0	1	−1	0.00
Total	13	1	2	10	9	35	−26	7.69

=== In AFC U-17 Asian Cup ===
Opponent	Pld	W	D	L	GF	GA	GD	Win %
Australia	3	2	0	1	7	5	+2	66.67
Bahrain	1	0	0	1	1	3	−2	0.00
China	4	0	3	1	2	3	−1	0.00
India	3	2	1	0	7	3	+4	66.67
Indonesia	1	1	0	0	2	0	+2	100.00
Iran	2	0	1	1	1	4	−3	0.00
Iraq	2	1	1	0	5	4	+1	50.00
Japan	4	1	0	3	7	13	−6	25.00
Jordan	1	1	0	0	5	1	+4	100.00
Kuwait	1	0	1	0	0	0	+0	0.00
Malaysia	1	1	0	0	3	2	+1	100.00
Myanmar	1	1	0	0	4	2	+2	100.00
Qatar	2	0	0	2	1	4	−3	0.00
Saudi Arabia	1	1	0	0	3	1	+2	100.00
South Korea	2	0	2	0	2	2	+0	0.00
Thailand	1	0	0	1	1	2	−1	0.00
Uzbekistan	2	0	0	2	1	6	−5	0.00
Vietnam	2	0	1	1	3	4	−1	0.00
Yemen	1	0	0	1	2	3	−1	0.00
Total	35	11	10	14	57	62	−5	31.43
