= Uzbekistan national under-17 football team =

National association football team

Uzbekistan
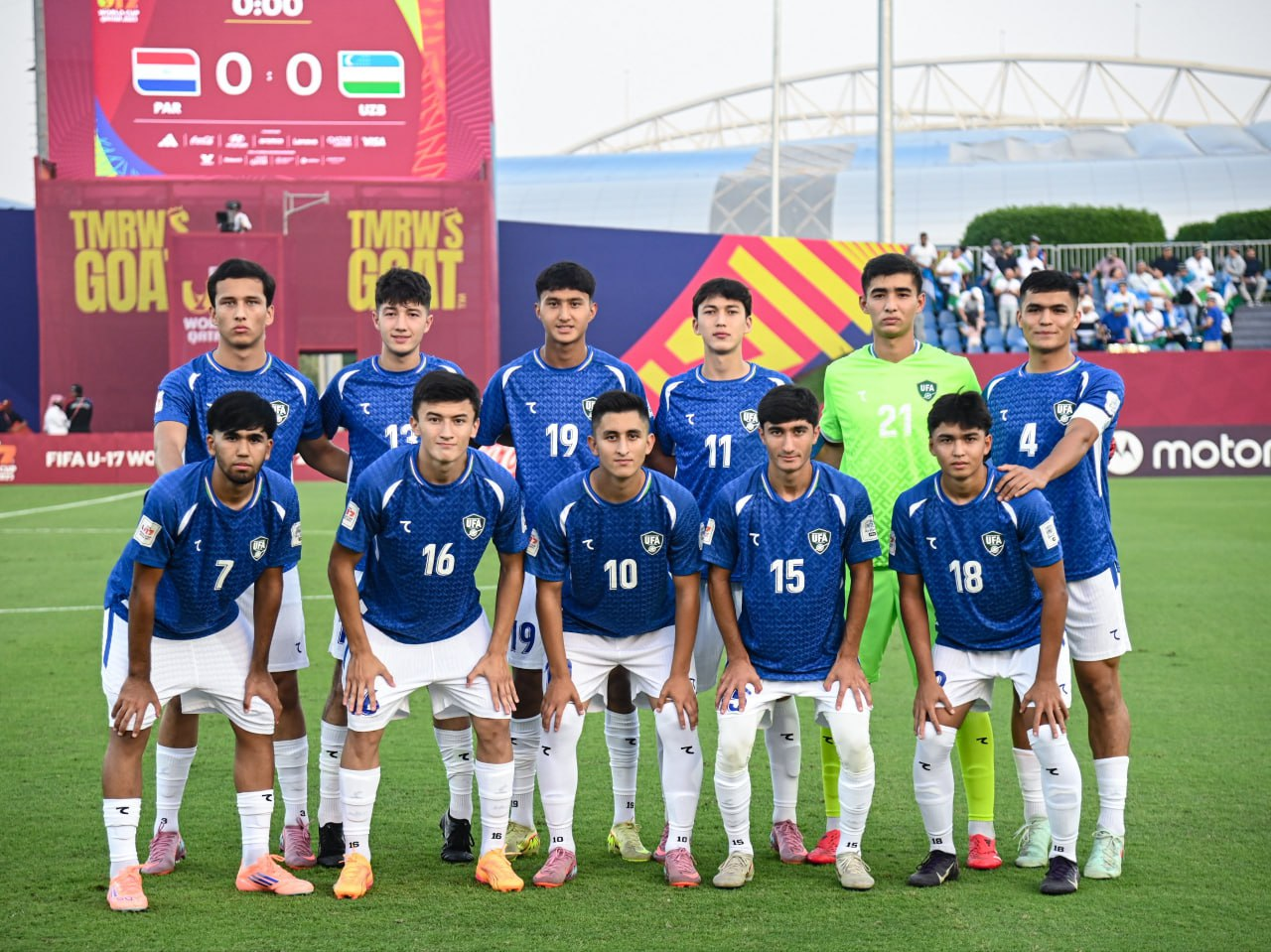
- Nickname(s): Oq boʻrilar (White Wolves)
- Association: Uzbekistan Football Association
- Confederation: AFC (Asia)
- Head coach: (Uzbekistan) Islom Ismoilov
- Home stadium: Pakhtakor Markaziy Stadium
- FIFA code: UZB
First colours	Second colours

First international
- Tajikistan 0–4 Uzbekistan (Almaty, Kazakhstan; 24 April 1993)

Biggest win
- Uzbekistan 14–0 Brunei (Tashkent, Uzbekistan; 5 October 2022)

Biggest defeat
- Argentina 8–0 Uzbekistan (Buenos Aires, Argentina; 8 March 2023)

FIFA U-17 World Cup
- Appearances: 4 (first in 2011)
- Best result: Quarter-finals (2011, 2023)

AFC U-17 Asian Cup
- Appearances: 11 (first in 1994)
- Best result: Champions (2012, 2025)

The Uzbekistan national under-17 football team represents Uzbekistan in international U-17 football competitions. It is controlled by the Uzbekistan Football Association and is a member of the Asian Football Confederation.

== Competitive record ==
=== FIFA U-17 World Cup ===
FIFA U-17 World Cup record
Year	Result	Pld	W	D	L	GF	GA
(China) 1985	Part of Soviet Union						
(Canada) 1987	Part of Soviet Union						
(Scotland) 1989	Part of Soviet Union						
(Italy) 1991	Part of Soviet Union						
(Japan) 1993	Did not qualify						
(Ecuador) 1995	Did not qualify						
(Egypt) 1997	Did not qualify						
(New Zealand) 1999	Did not qualify						
(Trinidad and Tobago) 2001	Did not qualify						
(Finland) 2003	Did not qualify						
(Peru) 2005	Did not qualify						
(South Korea) 2007	Did not qualify						
(Nigeria) 2009	Did not qualify						
(Mexico) 2011	Quarter-finals	5	3	0	2	9	8
(United Arab Emirates) 2013	Round of 16	4	2	1	1	4	2
(Chile) 2015	Did not qualify						
(India) 2017	Did not qualify						
(Brazil) 2019	Did not qualify						
(Indonesia) 2023	Quarter-finals	5	2	1	2	7	7
(Qatar) 2025	Round of 16	5	2	2	1	12	8
(Qatar) 2026	In progress	1	0	0	1	1	2
(Qatar) 2027	To be determined						
(Qatar) 2028	To be determined						
(Qatar) 2029	To be determined						
Total:5/24	Quarter-finals	20	9	4	7	33	27

=== AFC U-17 Asian Cup ===
AFC U-17 Asian Cup record
Hosts / Year	Result	GP	W	D*	L	GS	GA
(Qatar) 1985	Part of Soviet Union						
(Qatar) 1986	Part of Soviet Union						
(Thailand) 1988	Part of Soviet Union						
(United Arab Emirates) 1990	Part of Soviet Union						
(Saudi Arabia) 1992	Part of (Commonwealth of Independent States) CIS						
(Qatar) 1994	Group stage	4	0	0	4	3	31
(Thailand) 1996	Group stage	4	0	1	3	2	12
(Qatar) 1998	did not qualify						
(Vietnam) 2000	did not qualify						
(United Arab Emirates) 2002	Fourth-place	6	3	1	2	7	7
(Japan) 2004	Group stage	3	0	2	1	4	7
(Singapore) 2006	did not qualify						
(Uzbekistan) 2008	Quarter-finals	4	2	0	2	10	5
(Uzbekistan) 2010	Runners-up	6	4	1	1	15	5
(Iran) 2012	Champions	6	2	3	1	9	8
(Thailand) 2014	Quarter-finals	4	2	1	1	10	10
(India) 2016	Quarter-finals	4	3	0	1	9	6
(Malaysia) 2018	did not qualify						
(Thailand) 2023	Semi-finals	5	3	1	1	5	2
(Saudi Arabia) 2025	Champions	6	6	0	0	17	3
(Saudi Arabia) 2026	Semi-finals	4	2	2	0	8	3
(Saudi Arabia) 2027	qualified						
Total:11/15	2 Titles	56	27	12	17	99	99

== Managers ==
- (Uzbekistan) Aleksey Evstafeev, U15 – U17 (2009–2011)
- (Uzbekistan) Dilshod Nuraliev, U15 – U17 (2011–2013)
- (Uzbekistan) Timur Alimkhodjaev, U15 – U16 (2013–2014)
- (Uzbekistan) Alexander Mochinov, U16 (2014)
- (Uzbekistan) Timur Alimkhodjaev, U15 – U16 (2015–2016)
- (Uzbekistan) Dilshod Nuraliev, U15 (2017)
- (Uzbekistan) Azamat Abduraimov, U14 – U16 (2018–2020)
- (Uzbekistan) Olim Shokirov, U16 (2020–2021)
- (Uzbekistan) Jamoliddin Rakhmatullaev, U16 – U17 (2022–2023)
- (Uzbekistan) Islom Ismoilov, U16 – U17 (2024–)

== Current coaching staff ==
As of April 2023

Position	Name
Head coach	(Uzbekistan) Jamoliddin Rakhmatullaev
Assistant coach	(Uzbekistan) Sobir Usmankhadjaev
Fitness coach	(Uzbekistan) Anvar Rakhimov
Goalkeeper coach	(Uzbekistan) Ruslan Matniyazov

== Current squads ==
The following players were called up for the 2025 AFC U-17 Asian Cup in April 2025.

Caps and goals correct as of 3 April 2025, after the match against Thailand.

No.	Pos.	Player	Date of birth (age)	Caps	Goals	Club
1	GK	Ibrokhim Shokirov	18 March 2008 (age 18)	4	0	(Uzbekistan Football Association) Pakhtakor
12	GK	Bakhodir Izboskanov	22 July 2008 (age 18)	1	0	(Uzbekistan Football Association) Bunyodkor
21	GK	Nematullo Rustamzhonov	17 March 2008 (age 18)	8	0	(Uzbekistan Football Association) Olympic Tashkent
2	DF	Khodjiakbar Botiraliev	2 January 2008 (age 18)	6	0	(Uzbekistan Football Association) Namangan FA
3	DF	Mukhammad Khakimov	4 October 2009 (age 17)	3	0	(Uzbekistan Football Association) Pakhtakor
5	DF	Amirkhon Muradov	15 June 2008 (age 18)	9	0	(Uzbekistan Football Association) Pakhtakor
6	DF	Miraziz Abdukarimov	11 May 2008 (age 18)	10	0	(Uzbekistan Football Association) Sogdiana
13	DF	Abullokh Fazliddinov	20 January 2008 (age 18)	6	0	(Uzbekistan Football Association) Pakhtakor
14	DF	Bekhruz Saidmurodov	9 February 2008 (age 18)	10	0	(Uzbekistan Football Association) Pakhtakor
15	DF	Mukhammadali Musakhonov	18 December 2008 (age 17)	12	0	(Uzbekistan Football Association) Olympic Tashkent
23	DF	Dilyorbek Makhmudzhonov	3 December 2008 (age 17)	4	0	(Uzbekistan Football Association) Andijon
4	MF	Muminkhon Bakhodirkhonov	30 March 2008 (age 18)	11	1	(Uzbekistan Football Association) Olympic Tashkent
8	MF	Akbar Mukhammadov	29 May 2008 (age 18)	8	0	(Uzbekistan Football Association) Pakhtakor
10	MF	Mukhammad Khabibullaev	29 January 2008 (age 18)	12	3	(Uzbekistan Football Association) Lokomotiv Tashkent
16	MF	Azizbek Abdumuminov	3 November 2008 (age 18)	3	0	(Uzbekistan Football Association) Mash'al
18	MF	Abubakir Shukurullaev	2 February 2008 (age 18)	12	4	(Uzbekistan Football Association) Pakhtakor
19	MF	Azizbek Erimbetov	2 April 2008 (age 18)	12	0	(Uzbekistan Football Association) Jayhun Nukus
22	MF	Faridjon Abdullaev	13 August 2008 (age 18)	1	0	(Uzbekistan Football Association) TFA Tashkent
7	FW	Sadriddin Khasanov	21 May 2008 (age 18)	11	4	(Uzbekistan Football Association) Bunyodkor
9	FW	Nurbek Sarsenbaev	27 September 2008 (age 18)	10	4	(Uzbekistan Football Association) Bunyodkor
11	FW	Sayfiddin Sodikov	27 June 2008 (age 18)	12	1	(Uzbekistan Football Association) Olympic Tashkent
17	FW	Jamshidbek Rustamov	26 March 2008 (age 18)	10	4	(Uzbekistan Football Association) Olympic Tashkent
20	FW	Asilbek Aliev	8 June 2009 (age 17)	9	3	(Uzbekistan Football Association) Olympic Tashkent

== Previous squads ==
FIFA U-17 World Cup/Youth Championship squads

- 2023 FIFA U-17 World Cup squads – Uzbekistan
- 2013 FIFA U-17 World Cup squads – Uzbekistan
- 2011 FIFA U-17 World Cup squads – Uzbekistan

AFC U-16 Championship squads

- 2025 AFC U-17 Asian Cup squads – Uzbekistan
- 2023 AFC U-17 Asian Cup squads – Uzbekistan
- 2016 AFC U-16 Championship squads - Uzbekistan
- 2014 AFC U-16 Championship squads - Uzbekistan
- 2010 AFC U-16 Championship squads – Uzbekistan
- 2008 AFC U-16 Championship squads – Uzbekistan

== Recent results and friendlies ==
5 November 2025 FIFA U-17 World Cup Group J	Paraguay	2-1	Uzbekistan	Doha, Qatar
				Stadium: Aspire Zone

8 November 2025 FIFA U-17 World Cup Group J	Republic of Ireland	1-2	Uzbekistan	Doha, Qatar
				Stadium: Aspire Zone

11 November 2025 FIFA U-17 World Cup Group J	Uzbekistan	6-1	Panama	Doha, Qatar
				Stadium: Aspire Zone

15 November 2025 FIFA U-17 World Cup Round of 32	Croatia	1-1 (4-5 p)	Uzbekistan	Doha, Qatar
				Stadium: Aspire Zone

18 November 2025 FIFA U-17 World Cup Round of 16	Italy	3-2	Uzbekistan	Doha, Qatar
				Stadium: Aspire Zone

19 May 2026 AFC U-17 Asian Cup Semifinal	Japan	1-1 (3-2 p)	Uzbekistan	Tokyo, Japan
				Stadium: National Stadium

== Head-to-head record ==
The following table shows Uzbekistan's head-to-head record in the FIFA U-17 World Cup and AFC U-17 Asian Cup.

=== In FIFA U-17 World Cup ===
Opponent	Pld	W	D	L	GF	GA	GD	Win %
Australia	1	1	0	0	4	0	+4	100.00
Canada	1	1	0	0	3	0	+3	100.00
Croatia	2	1	1	0	3	2	+1	50.00
Czech Republic	1	1	0	0	2	1	+1	100.00
England	1	1	0	0	2	1	+1	100.00
France	1	0	0	1	0	1	−1	0.00
Honduras	1	0	0	1	0	1	−1	0.00
Italy	1	0	0	1	2	3	−1	0.00
Ivory Coast	1	0	0	1	1	2	−1	0.00
Mali	1	0	0	1	0	3	−3	0.00
Morocco	1	0	1	0	0	0	+0	0.00
New Zealand	1	0	0	1	1	4	−3	0.00
Panama	2	2	0	0	8	1	+7	100.00
Paraguay	1	1	0	0	2	1	+1	100.00
Republic of Ireland	1	0	0	1	1	2	−1	0.00
Spain	1	0	1	0	2	2	+0	0.00
United States	1	1	0	0	2	1	+1	100.00
Uruguay	1	0	0	1	0	2	−2	0.00
Total	20	9	4	7	33	27	+6	45.00

=== In AFC U-17 Asian Cup ===
Opponent	Pld	W	D	L	GF	GA	GD	Win %
Australia	1	1	0	0	2	1	+1	100.00
Bahrain	1	1	0	0	2	0	+2	100.00
Bangladesh	1	0	1	0	1	1	+0	0.00
China	4	1	1	2	3	14	−11	25.00
India	2	2	0	0	4	2	+2	100.00
Indonesia	1	1	0	0	3	0	+3	100.00
Iran	2	1	0	1	4	4	+0	50.00
Iraq	2	0	0	2	1	6	−5	0.00
Japan	4	1	2	1	4	6	−2	25.00
Jordan	1	0	1	0	0	0	+0	0.00
Kuwait	2	1	0	1	4	4	+0	50.00
Nepal	1	0	1	0	1	1	+0	0.00
North Korea	4	3	0	1	9	5	+4	75.00
Oman	2	0	0	2	2	14	−12	0.00
Qatar	3	1	1	1	4	8	−4	33.33
Saudi Arabia	4	3	0	1	8	6	+2	75.00
Singapore	1	1	0	0	7	0	+7	100.00
South Korea	5	0	2	3	2	10	−8	0.00
Syria	4	1	1	2	5	8	−3	25.00
Tajikistan	1	1	0	0	8	1	+7	100.00
Thailand	2	2	0	0	9	4	+5	100.00
United Arab Emirates	2	2	0	0	6	1	+5	100.00
Vietnam	1	1	0	0	1	0	+1	100.00
Yemen	1	1	0	0	1	0	+1	100.00
Total	52	25	10	17	91	96	−5	48.08

== See also ==
- Uzbekistan national under-20 football team
- Uzbekistan national under-23 football team
- Uzbekistan national football team
