= Indonesia national under-17 football team =

Indonesia U-17
- Nickname(s): Garuda Muda (The Young Garuda); Merah Putih (The Red and White)
- Association: PSSI (Football Association of Indonesia)
- Confederation: AFC (Asia)
- Sub-confederation: AFF (Southeast Asia)
- Head coach: David Nascimento
- Captain: Ramadhan Putra
- Most caps: Mierza Firjatullah (26)
- Top scorer: Bagus Kahfi (17)
- Home stadium: Gelora Bung Karno Stadium
- FIFA code: IDN
First colours	Second colours

First international
- Indonesia 8–0 Singapore (Jakarta, Indonesia; 2 May 1986)

Biggest win
- Indonesia 25–0 Pakistan (Tehran, Iran; 28 October 2012)

Biggest defeat
- Japan 11–1 Indonesia (Nagoya, Japan; 25 June 2000)

FIFA U-17 World Cup
- Appearances: 2 (first in 2023)
- Best result: Group stage (2023, 2025)

AFC U-17 Asian Cup
- Appearances: 7 (first in 1986)
- Best result: Fourth place (1990)

ASEAN U-16 Boys Championship
- Appearances: 12 (first in 2002)
- Best result: Champions (2018, 2022)

Indonesia national under-17 football team represents Indonesia in international football competitions such as FIFA U-17 World Cup, AFC U-17 Asian Cup, ASEAN U-16 Boys Championship, and any other under-17 international football tournaments. It is controlled by the Football Association of Indonesia (PSSI).

== Recent history ==
The team won the AFF U-16 Youth Championship twice, in 2018 and 2022.

=== 2023–2025: Playing at the World Cup ===
They qualified for the 2023 FIFA U-17 World Cup as a replacement for Peru, whose hosting rights were withdrawn in April 2023. This was the first ever FIFA tournament hosted by the country, its only third FIFA tournament ever, (Note: Does not count the participation at the 1956 Summer Olympic football tournament; an Olympic football tournament is not considered as a FIFA tournament.) and the first since 1979, when their U-20 team played at the FIFA World Youth Championship as the second Asian team, replacing three 1978 AFC Youth Championship semi-finalists who forfeited. Indonesia also became the first Southeast Asian country to play in all three of FIFA men's football tournament. (Note: Played in the 1938 FIFA World Cup, as of 2026 remains the only Southeast Asian representation at the World Cup.)

The team started the tournament by scoring the country's first ever goal at a FIFA tournament courtesy of Arkhan Kaka in the match against Ecuador. They conceded an equaliser later, but managed to become the first Southeast Asian country to both score a goal and avoid defeat at a FIFA men's football tournament match. (Note: Malaysia lost all three group stage matches at the 1997 FIFA World Youth Championship; Thailand lost all three group stage matches at the 1997 and 1999 FIFA U-17 World Championships; Myanmar lost all three group stage matches at the 2015 FIFA U-20 World Cup; Vietnam's only point at the 2017 FIFA U-20 World Cup came from a 0–0 draw.) He then scored the equaliser in the second match against Panama. Nabil Asyura scored the consolation goal in 3–1 defeat against Morocco, which concluded their participation.

The team then qualified for the 2025 AFC U-17 Asian Cup, in which their victory against South Korea and Yemen secured their qualification to the expanded 48-team FIFA U-17 World Cup, the country's first successful qualification campaign to a FIFA tournament. (Note: In the 1938 FIFA World Cup, the then-Dutch East Indies won by walkover against both Japan and the United States who withdrew; the 1979 and 2023 participations are already mentioned above.)

Indonesia were drawn to Group H alongside four-time champions Brazil, tournament debutants Zambia, and CONCACAF representatives Honduras. Zahaby Gholy opened the scoring in the first game, but Zambia then made a comeback to win 3–1. Against Brazil, they were dismantled 4–0. In the third group match, Evandra Florasta scored Indonesia's first goal from a penalty kick. Honduras quickly equalised via the same manner. Fadly Alberto then scored Indonesia's first ever second goal in a FIFA tournament, securing Indonesia's first ever win at any FIFA tournament, which was also the first win for a Southeast Asian team in a FIFA men's football tournament match. Upon the team's elimination, head coach Nova Arianto was promoted alongside his overage players to the U-20 national team, and he was replaced by former teammate Kurniawan Dwi Yulianto.

=== 2026–present: Declining ===
Under the new head coach and with an almost entirely new team, Indonesia were battered at home 7–0 in a friendly against China. The teams then played a rematch, in which China won 3–2. They then got eliminated in the group stage of the 2026 ASEAN U-17 Boys' Championship, their worst result since 2017 and the first time such thing happened at home soil since 2008.

Having qualified as quarter-finalists the year prior, they were in the 2026 AFC U-17 Asian Cup. They beat China 1–0 in the first game, but defeats against Qatar and Japan combined with Qatar's loss to China made sure they became the group's only side to not play in the 2026 FIFA U-17 World Cup, with Qatar as the tournament hosts automatically qualified.

== Coaching staff ==
Position	Name
Head coach	(Portugal) David Nascimento
Assistant coaches	Ahmad Bustomi
Assistant coaches	Simon Tahamata
Goalkeeping coaches	(Indonesia) Arief Priyadhi
Fitness coach	Muhamad Alimudin
Analyst	(Indonesia) Taufik Nur Hidayat
Doctor	Vacant
Physiotherapists	Vacant
Team manager	Vacant

== Coaching history ==
- (Indonesia) Subangkit (2007)
- (Indonesia) Mundari Karya (2008)
- (Indonesia) Indra Sjafri (2011–2013)
- (Indonesia) Sutan Harhara (2013)
- (Indonesia) Fakhri Husaini (2014–2018)
- (Indonesia) Bima Sakti (2018–2023)
- (Indonesia) Nova Arianto (2023–2025)
- (Indonesia) Kurniawan Dwi Yulianto (2026)
- (Portugal) David Nascimento (2026–present)

== Players ==
=== Current squad ===
The following players were called up for the training camp ahead of the 2027 AFC U-17 Asian Cup qualification.

No.	Pos.	Player	Date of birth (age)	Club
1	GK	Abdillah Ishak	3 March 2010 (age 16)	(Football Association of Indonesia) Persija Jakarta
12	GK	Sendi Juliansyah	4 July 2010 (age 16)	(Football Association of Indonesia) Dewa United
23	GK	Syahdan Caesar	23 May 2010 (age 16)	(Football Association of Indonesia) ASIOP
2	DF	Rasya Keandra	2 August 2010 (age 16)	(Football Association of Indonesia) SSB biMBA AIUEO
3	DF	Faiz Hikmal	9 February 2010 (age 16)	(Football Association of Indonesia) Imran Soccer Academy
4	DF	Ramadhan Putra (captain)	16 August 2010 (age 16)	(Football Association of Indonesia) Persebaya Surabaya
5	DF	Allekay Kaisar	5 September 2010 (age 16)	(Football Association of Indonesia) Persik Kediri
13	DF	Gede Kayana	13 May 2011 (age 15)	(Football Association of Indonesia) Bali United
19	DF	Faiz Fathurrahman	19 November 2010 (age 16)	(Football Association of Indonesia) SSB biMBA AIUEO
20	DF	Pradipta Arya	2 June 2010 (age 16)	(Football Association of Indonesia) Persik Kediri
6	MF	Kadek Dwi Sedana	6 April 2011 (age 15)	(Football Association of Indonesia) Bali United
7	MF	Valdo Putra	7 August 2010 (age 16)	(Football Association of Indonesia) Persija Jakarta
8	MF	Haikal Kamil	19 August 2010 (age 16)	(Football Association of Indonesia) Persik Kediri
10	MF	Stenly Meyanu	23 October 2010 (age 16)	(Football Association of Indonesia) Papua Football Academy
14	MF	Edsel Henrian	1 December 2010 (age 15)	(Football Association of Indonesia) Persija Jakarta
17	MF	Dewa Gede Majesta	17 May 2010 (age 16)	(Football Association of Indonesia) Bali United
22	MF	Melki Yatipai	22 February 2010 (age 16)	(Football Association of Indonesia) Papua Football Academy
9	FW	Ichiro Akbar	9 January 2010 (age 16)	(Football Association of Indonesia) Bhayangkara Presisi Lampung
11	FW	Dzaky Azfar	12 October 2010 (age 16)	(Football Association of Indonesia) Bhayangkara Presisi Lampung
15	FW	Dolvi Solossa	15 November 2010 (age 16)	(Football Association of Indonesia) Papua Football Academy
16	FW	Dhamar Try Kusuma	16 January 2010 (age 16)	(Football Association of Indonesia) Persik Kediri
18	FW	Chico Yarangga	28 March 2010 (age 16)	(Football Association of Indonesia) ASIOP
21	FW	Yance Imbiri	21 March 2010 (age 16)	(Football Association of Indonesia) Papua Football Academy

=== Recent call-ups ===
The following players have also been called up to the squad within the last 12 months.

Pos.	Player	Date of birth (age)	Caps	Goals	Club	Latest call-up
GK	Firlo Jony	16 September 2010 (age 16)	-	-	(Indonesia) Persis Solo	vs Malaysia, July 2026
DF	Puma Nandhito	31 January 2010 (age 16)	-	-	(Indonesia) Persija Jakarta	vs Malaysia, July 2026
DF	Ramadhani Krishna	14 August 2010 (age 16)	-	-	(Indonesia) Persis Solo	vs Malaysia, July 2026
FW	Rifqy Arifin	9 November 2010 (age 16)	-	-	(Indonesia) SSB biMBA AIUEO	vs Malaysia, July 2026
Notes: ^{PRE} = Preliminary squad; ^{SUS} = Suspended; ^{INJ} = Withdrew from the roster due to an injury; ^{UNF} = Withdrew from the roster due to unfit condition; ^{RET} = Retired from the national team; ^{WD} = Withdrew from the roster for non-injury related reasons

== Results ==
The following is a list of match results, as well as any future matches that have been scheduled.

Win Draw Loss Fixture

=== 2026 ===
8 February Friendly	Indonesia	0–7	China	Tangerang, Indonesia
21:00 UTC+7		Source	Zhao Songyuan 16', 42'; Wang Heyi 25'; Shuai Weihao 44', 53'; Zhang Bolin 74'; Ailikamu Yilihong 90+1'	Stadium: Indomilk Arena; Referee: Songkran Bunmeekiart (Thailand)

11 February Friendly	Indonesia	2–3	China	Tangerang, Indonesia
18:30 UTC+7	Chico Jericho 22'; Miraj Rizky 49' (pen.)		Zhao Songyuan 9'; He Sifan 37'; Noah Duvert 90+4' (o.g.)	Stadium: Indomilk Arena; Referee: Cllifford Daypuyat (Philippine)

13 April 2026 ASEAN U-17 Boys' Championship	Indonesia	4–0	Timor-Leste	Gresik, Indonesia
19:30 UTC+7	Ekayana 6', 17'; Ridho 36'; Dava 41'	Report		Stadium: Gelora Joko Samudro Stadium; Referee: Meder Taichiev (Kyrgyzstan)

16 April 2026 ASEAN U-17 Boys' Championship	Malaysia	1–0	Indonesia	Gresik, Indonesia
19:30 UTC+7	Fareez 33'	Report		Stadium: Gelora Joko Samudro Stadium; Referee: Yusuke Ohashi (Japan)

19 April 2026 ASEAN U-17 Boys' Championship	Indonesia	0–0	Vietnam	Sidoarjo, Indonesia
19:30 UTC+7		Report		Stadium: Gelora Delta Stadium; Referee: Choi Cheol-jun (South Korea)

28 April Friendly	Saudi Arabia	2–1	Indonesia	Saudi Arabia
--:-- UTC+3	Faris Boushqra 24', 73'		84' (pen.)

5 May 2026 AFC U-17 Asian Cup	Indonesia	1–0	China	Jeddah, Saudi Arabia
19:30 UTC+3	Keanu 87'	Report		Stadium: King Abdullah Sports City Training Stadium (Pitch A); Referee: Abdullah Al-Shehri (Saudi Arabia)

9 May 2026 AFC U-17 Asian Cup	Qatar	2–0	Indonesia	Jeddah, Saudi Arabia
19:30 UTC+3	Tokode 57'; Larbi 66'	Report		Stadium: King Abdullah Sports City Training Stadium (Pitch A); Referee: Veronika Bernatskaia (Kyrgyzstan)

12 May 2026 AFC U-17 Asian Cup	Japan	3–1	Indonesia	Jeddah, Saudi Arabia
19:00 UTC+3	Tsuneyoshi 28'; Wada 59'; Okamoto 71'	Report	Tjoe 70'	Stadium: King Abdullah Sports City Training Stadium (Pitch A); Referee: Harish Kundu (India)

4 July Garuda Championship Series	Indonesia	1–1	Malaysia	Surakarta, Indonesia
20:00 UTC+7	Kusuma 80'	Report	Muzakif 90+6'	Stadium: Manahan Stadium; Referee: Clifford Daypuyat (Philippines)

7 July Garuda Championship Series	Indonesia	3–0	Malaysia	Surakarta, Indonesia
20:00 UTC+7	Ramadhan 11'; Kusuma 21'; Majesta 43'	Report		Stadium: Manahan Stadium

28 October Friendly	Malaysia	0–2	Indonesia	Gambang, Malaysia
--:-- UTC+8		Report	Chiko 27'; Alle 68'	Stadium: Mokhtar Dahari Academy

31 October Friendly	Indonesia	2–1	Malaysia	Gambang, Malaysia
--:-- UTC+8	Kusuma; Azfar		Goal	Stadium: Mokhtar Dahari Academy

11 November 2027 AFC U-17 Asian Cup qualification	Philippines	0–3	Indonesia	Yangon, Myanmar
15:00 UTC+6:30		Report	Dhamar 37', 45+1'; Majesta 76'	Stadium: Padaythar Stadium; Referee: Mohammed Al-Jaberi (Iraq)

14 November 2027 AFC U-17 Asian Cup qualification	Indonesia	2–0	Cambodia	Yangon, Myanmar
15:00 UTC+6:30	Solossa 10'; Yatipai 35'	Report		Stadium: Starcity Sports Club; Referee: Hasan Al-Haddad (Kuwait)

17 November 2027 AFC U-17 Asian Cup qualification	Afghanistan	0–4	Indonesia	Yangon, Myanmar
15:00 UTC+6:30		Report	Majesta 8'; Dzaky 52', 76'; Dhamar 72'	Stadium: Starcity Sports Club; Referee: Mohammad Osama Diwan (Jordan)

20 November 2027 AFC U-17 Asian Cup qualification	Indonesia	2–2	Myanmar	Yangon, Myanmar
15:00 UTC+6:30	Solossa 76'; Majesta 90+2'		Thura Hein Htet 5'; Paing Zay Tun 79'	Stadium: Padaythar Stadium; Referee: Lei-Ka Wong (Macau)

== Competitive record ==
=== FIFA U-17 World Cup ===
Year	Result	GP	W	D	L	GF	GA
(China) 1985	Did not enter						
(Canada) 1987	Did not qualify						
(Scotland) 1989	Did not qualify						
(Italy) 1991	Did not qualify						
(Japan) 1993	Did not qualify						
(Ecuador) 1995	Did not qualify						
(Egypt) 1997	Did not qualify						
(New Zealand) 1999	Did not qualify						
(Trinidad and Tobago) 2001	Did not qualify						
(Finland) 2003	Did not qualify						
(Peru) 2005	Did not qualify						
(South Korea) 2007	Did not enter						
(Nigeria) 2009	Did not qualify						
(Mexico) 2011	Did not qualify						
(United Arab Emirates) 2013	Did not qualify						
(Chile) 2015	Did not qualify						
(India) 2017	Disqualified due to FIFA suspension						
(Brazil) 2019	Did not qualify						
(Indonesia) 2023	Group stage	3	0	2	1	3	5
(Qatar) 2025	Group stage	3	1	0	2	3	8
(Qatar) 2026	Did not qualify						
(Qatar) 2027	To be determined						
(Qatar) 2028	To be determined						
(Qatar) 2029	To be determined						
Total:2/24	Group stage	6	1	2	3	6	13

=== AFC U-17 Asian Cup ===
AFC U-17 Asian Cup record									Qualifications record					
Year	Result	Position	GP	W	D	L	GF	GA	GP	W	D	L	GF	GA
(Qatar) 1985	Withdrew								Withdrew					
(Qatar) 1986	Group stage	8th	3	0	0	3	2	8	N/A					
(Thailand) 1988	Group stage	10th	4	0	1	3	3	15	3	2	0	1	3	3
(United Arab Emirates) 1990	Fourth place	4th	4	0	2	2	1	8	N/A					
(Saudi Arabia) 1992	Did not qualify								3	2	0	1	3	5
(Qatar) 1994	Did not qualify								N/A					
(Thailand) 1996	Did not qualify								N/A					
(Qatar) 1998	Did not qualify								3	1	1	1	8	8
(Vietnam) 2000	Did not qualify								3	2	0	1	15	16
(United Arab Emirates) 2002	Did not qualify								2	0	2	0	2	2
(Japan) 2004	Did not qualify								2	0	1	1	2	4
(Singapore) 2006	Did not enter								Did not enter					
(Uzbekistan) 2008	Group stage	14th	3	0	0	3	1	12	5	3	0	2	7	4
(Uzbekistan) 2010	Group stage	11th	3	1	0	2	4	5	4	2	1	1	10	3
(Iran) 2012	Did not qualify								5	3	0	2	26	10
(Thailand) 2014	Did not qualify								3	0	1	2	1	5
(India) 2016	Disqualified due to FIFA suspension								Disqualified					
(Malaysia) 2018	Quarter-finals	6th	4	1	2	1	5	4	4	4	0	0	25	1
(Bahrain) ~~2020~~	Cancelled due to the COVID-19 pandemic								4	3	1	0	27	1
(Thailand) 2023	Did not qualify								4	3	0	1	20	7
(Saudi Arabia) 2025	Quarter-finals	5th	4	3	0	1	7	7	3	2	1	0	11	0
(Saudi Arabia) 2026	Group stage	11th	3	1	0	2	2	5	Qualified automatically					
(Uzbekistan) 2027	Qualified								To be determined					
(Saudi Arabia) 2028	To be determined								To be determined					
Total	Best: Fourth place	8/21	28	6	5	17	25	64	45	27	8	13	160	69

AFC U-17 Asian Cup history
First match	Indonesia 1–5 Saudi Arabia (15 November 1986; Doha, Qatar)
Biggest win	Indonesia 4–1 Tajikistan (26 October 2010; Tashkent, Uzbekistan); Indonesia 4–1 Yemen (7 April 2025; Jeddah, Saudi Arabia)
Biggest defeat	Indonesia 0–9 South Korea (6 October 2008; Tashkent, Uzbekistan)
Best result	Fourth place (1990)

=== ASEAN U-16 Boys Championship ===
ASEAN U-16 Boys Championship record
Year	Result	Position	GP	W	D	L	GF	GA
(Indonesia) (Malaysia) 2002	Third place	3rd	6	3	1	2	9	8
(Thailand) 2005	Group stage	7th	2	0	0	2	3	9
(Vietnam) 2006	Did not enter							
(Cambodia) 2007	Fourth place	4th	6	2	3	1	8	7
(Indonesia) 2008	Group stage	5th	4	0	1	3	1	11
(Thailand) ~~2009~~	Cancelled							
(Indonesia) 2010	Fourth place	4th	4	1	0	3	2	5
(Laos) 2011	Group stage	8th	4	0	2	2	4	8
(Laos) 2012	Did not enter							
(Myanmar) 2013	Runners-up	2nd	6	2	4	0	10	4
(Indonesia) ~~2014~~	Cancelled							
(Cambodia) 2015	Disqualified due to FIFA suspension							
(Cambodia) 2016	Disqualified due to FIFA suspension							
(Thailand) 2017	Group stage	9th	5	1	1	3	7	13
(Indonesia) 2018	Champions	1st	7	6	1	0	23	4
(Thailand) 2019	Third place	3rd	7	4	2	1	15	3
(Indonesia) 2022	Champions	1st	5	4	1	0	15	2
(Indonesia) 2024	Third place	3rd	5	4	0	1	20	6
(Indonesia) 2026	Group stage	6th	3	1	1	1	4	1
Total	Best: Champions	13/17	64	28	17	19	121	81

ASEAN U-16 Boys Championship history
First match	Indonesia 2–1 Thailand (19 February 2002; Medan, Indonesia)
Biggest win	Singapore 0–9 Indonesia (3 August 2022; Sleman, Indonesia)
Biggest defeat	Myanmar 6–0 Indonesia (28 February 2002; Kuala Lumpur, Malaysia); Australia 6–0 Indonesia (11 July 2008; Jakarta, Indonesia)
Best result	Champions (2018 and 2022)

=== Exhibition ===
Exhibition game
Year	Tournament	Result	Position	GP	W	D	L	GF	GA
2012	(Hong Kong) HKFA International Youth Football Invitation Tournament	Champions	1st	3	3	0	0	8	2
2017	(Vietnam) Tien Phong Plastic Cup Tournament	Champions	1st	3	2	1	0	16	2
2018	JENESYS Japan-ASEAN U-16 Youth Football Tournament	Champions	1st	4	4	0	0	14	1
2019	(Myanmar) AFC-UEFA Assist U-16 Elite Boys Football Tournament	Runners-up	2nd	3	2	1	0	4	1
2019	(Qatar) Aspire U-16 Four Nations Tournament	Runners-up	2nd	3	2	0	1	7	2

== Head-to-head record ==
The following table shows Indonesia's head-to-head record in the FIFA U-17 World Cup and AFC U-17 Asian Cup.

=== In FIFA U-17 World Cup ===
Opponent	Pld	W	D	L	GF	GA	GD	Win %
Brazil	1	0	0	1	0	4	−4	0.00
Ecuador	1	0	1	0	1	1	+0	0.00
Honduras	1	1	0	0	2	1	+1	100.00
Morocco	1	0	0	1	1	3	−2	0.00
Panama	1	0	1	0	1	1	+0	0.00
Zambia	1	0	0	1	1	3	−2	0.00
Total	6	1	2	3	6	13	−7	16.67

=== In AFC U-17 Asian Cup ===
Opponent	Pld	W	D	L	GF	GA	GD	Win %
Afghanistan	1	1	0	0	2	0	+2	100.00
Australia	1	0	0	1	2	3	−1	0.00
Bahrain	1	0	1	0	2	2	+0	0.00
Bangladesh	1	0	0	1	1	2	−1	0.00
China	2	1	0	1	1	5	−4	50.00
India	2	0	1	1	0	1	−1	0.00
Iran	1	1	0	0	2	0	+2	100.00
Japan	1	0	0	1	1	3	−2	0.00
Jordan	1	0	0	1	0	1	−1	0.00
North Korea	1	0	0	1	0	6	−6	0.00
Qatar	3	0	1	2	0	3	−3	0.00
Saudi Arabia	2	0	0	2	1	9	−8	0.00
South Korea	4	1	1	2	3	17	−14	25.00
Syria	1	0	0	1	1	2	−1	0.00
Tajikistan	1	1	0	0	4	1	+3	100.00
Thailand	1	0	0	1	0	2	−2	0.00
United Arab Emirates	1	0	0	1	0	2	−2	0.00
Uzbekistan	1	0	0	1	0	3	−3	0.00
Vietnam	1	0	1	0	1	1	+0	0.00
Yemen	1	1	0	0	4	1	+3	100.00
Total	28	6	5	17	25	64	−39	21.43

== Honours ==
=== Regional ===
- ASEAN U-16 Boys' Championship
  - (gold) Champions (2): 2018, 2022
  - (silver) Runners-up (1): 2013
  - (bronze) Third place (3): 2002, 2019, 2024

=== Exhibition tournaments ===
- HKFA International Youth Football Invitation Tournament
  - (gold) Champions (1): 2012
- Tien Phong Plastic Cup Tournament
  - (gold) Champions (1): 2017
- JENESYS Japan-ASEAN U-16 Youth Football Tournament
  - (gold) Champions (1): 2018
- Garuda Championship Series
  - (gold) Champions (1): 2026
- Independence Cup
  - (silver) Runners-Up (1): 2024
- Pinatar Super Cup
  - (bronze) Third Place (1): 2025

== Previous squads ==
FIFA U-17 World Cup squads

- 2023 FIFA U-17 WC squad
- 2025 FIFA U-17 WC squad

AFC U-17 Asian Cup squads

- 2010 AFC U-16 Championship squad
- 2018 AFC U-16 Championship squad
- 2025 AFC U-17 Asian Cup squad
- 2026 AFC U-17 Asian Cup squad

== See also ==
- Indonesia national football team
- Indonesia women's national football team
- Indonesia national under-23 football team
- Indonesia national under-21 football team
- Indonesia national under-20 football team
- Indonesia national under-15 football team
- Indonesia women's national under-20 football team
- Indonesia women's national under-17 football team
