= Fahad Thani =

Qatari footballer and manager (born 1973)

Personal information
- Full name: Fahad Abdullah Al Thani Alzraa
- Date of birth: 1 December 1973 (age 52)
- Place of birth: Doha, Qatar
- Position: Right back

Youth career
- 1985–1990: Al Ahli

Senior career*
Years	Team	Apps	(Gls)
1990–1993	Al Ahli		

Managerial career
- 1995–1999: Al Rayyan (U–17)
- 1995–2001: Qatar U–17 (assistant)
- 2003–2005: Qatar U–14
- 2005–2006: Qatar U–17
- 2006–2011: ASPIRE
- 2011: Qatar U–17 (assistant)
- 2011–2013: Qatar (assistant)
- 2013–2014: Qatar
- 2014–2017: Qatar Olympic
- * Club domestic league appearances and goals

Fahad Thani (born 1 December 1973) is a Qatari former football player and current manager of the Qatar olympic football team. Thani, coaching mainly youth teams, including the Qatar U–17, was named as the replacement for Paulo Autuori as head coach of the Qatar national team in January 2013.

Thani graduated from the University of Qatar in 1996 with a degree in athletic training and in 1999 achieved an AFC "C" Coaching License and later in 2005 earned an AFC "A" License.

== Career ==
=== Playing career ===
Starting his playing career in the youth teams of Al Ahli, Thani played as a right back. He broke into the first team in 1990 at the age of 17, at a time when Al Ahli was undergoing its best years with the likes of Adel Malallah and Issa Ahmed playing for the club. His most notable achievement with Al Ahli was when he won the Emir of Qatar Cup in 1992, defeating Al Rayyan in the 2nd leg after losing the 1st leg 2–1.

He also played for Qatar's national youth teams.

=== Managerial career ===
Thani retired from football in 1993 and took up coaching. He first coached the youth teams of Al Rayyan and Al Ahli from 1994 to 1999, in addition to landing a job as the assistant coach of the Qatar U–17 team in 1995. He worked alongside future Manchester United coach René Meulensteen. After a two-year stint with the Qatar U–14 team, he was appointed head coach of the Qatar U–17 team in 2005. However, he failed to guide his team through the Asian qualifiers that year and also failed to make an impact in the 2006 GCC U-17 Championship.

After leaving his national team post, he was a part of ASPIRE Academy's coaching staff, managing the U–16 team. In 2011, he once again joined the Qatar U–17 team as an assistant coach during the 2011 GCC U-17 Championship. He was later appointed as the assistant coach of Qatar under Sebastião Lazaroni in August 2011. In January 2013, after a series of disappointing results and performances, namely a lackluster performance in the 21st Arabian Gulf Cup, Paulo Autuori mutually terminated his contract with the QFA and Thani was chosen as the new head coach.

He adopted a different policy on player selection than his predecessors, with only 7 of the 26 players he called up for the 2015 AFC Asian Cup qualification being foreign-born. His managerial debut came against Lebanon, which Qatar emerged 1–0 winners of after dominating the game, and, consequently, missing a late penalty. A week later, on 6 February, Qatar played their first competitive match against Malaysia as part of the 2015 AFC Asian Cup qualification. They narrowly won the match 2–0.

Thani's first real test as manager of Qatar came against Egypt on 8 March 2013 in a match which was organized in preparation for a World Cup Qualifying match against South Korea. Previously, on 28 December 2012, Egypt had defeated Qatar 2–0, then under Paulo Autuori, in Doha. However, under Thani's command, the match ended in a 3–1 victory for Qatar in the same venue. Egypt were missing most of their key players and the match was not recorded in FIFA's official calendar.

His team's first competitive loss came against Bahrain on 18 March 2013 in an away match for the 2015 AFC Asian Cup qualifiers. Qatar then lost 1–2 to South Korea in an away match on 26 March 2013 due to a goal in the last minute of injury time for the hosts.

== Honors ==
Al Ahli

- Emir of Qatar Cup: 1992
