= Al-Ali =

Al-Ali' (العلي) (English: The Sublimely Exalted) may refer to:

- Al-Ali, one of the 99 names of God
- Al Ali (tribe)
- Naji al-Ali, Palestinian cartoonist assassinated in London
- Ali (disambiguation)
- Rayyan Al-Ali (born 2006), Qatari footballer
