= 2014 Arab Cup U-17 =

Tournament details
- Host country: Qatar
- Dates: October 20 – November 2
- Teams: 7 (from 2 confederations)
- Venues: 2 (in 1 host city)

Final positions
- Champions: Iraq (1st title)
- Runners-up: Saudi Arabia
- Third place: Djibouti
- Fourth place: Qatar

Tournament statistics
- Matches played: 13
- Goals scored: 44 (3.38 per match)
- Top scorer(s): (Djibouti) Moussa Hassan (6 goals)
- Best player: (Iraq) Amir Sabah

The 2014 Arab Cup U-17 was the third edition of the Arab Cup U-17, an association football tournament between Arabic countries. It was played from October to November 2014 and hosted by Qatar.

== Participants ==
- Djibouti
- Iraq
- Mauritania
- Palestine
- Qatar
- Saudi Arabia
- Sudan

Bahrain withdrew from the tournament.

== Teams and Draw ==
The draw took place on 15 August 2014, in Doha Qatar.

The teams were drawn into the following groups:

Group A	Group B
Qatar (host); Djibouti; Mauritania	Iraq; Palestine; Saudi Arabia; Sudan

== Group stage ==
=== Group A ===
Team	Pld	W	D	L	GF	GA	GD	Pts
Qatar	2	1	1	0	4	2	+2	4
Djibouti	2	1	1	0	5	4	+1	4
Mauritania	2	0	0	2	4	7	−3	0

20 October 2014
16:30

Mauritania	3–4	Djibouti

Saoud bin Abdulrahman Stadium, Al Wakrah
Referee: Mohamed Al-Hoish (Saudi Arabia)

23 October 2014
16:30

Qatar	3–1	Mauritania

Saoud bin Abdulrahman Stadium, Al Wakrah
Referee: Jasem Ahmad (Kuwait)

26 October 2014
15:30

Djibouti	1–1	Qatar

Saoud bin Abdulrahman Stadium, Al Wakrah
Referee: Wathik Mohammed Abdallah Al-Baag (Iraq)

=== Group B ===
Team	Pld	W	D	L	GF	GA	GD	Pts
Iraq	3	2	1	0	4	1	+3	7
Saudi Arabia	3	1	2	0	6	1	+5	5
Sudan	3	1	1	1	4	3	+1	4
Palestine	3	0	0	3	0	9	−9	0

21 October 2014
15:15

Iraq	2–1	Sudan

Suheim Bin Hamad Stadium, Doha
Referee: Khamis Al-Kuwari (Qatar)
21 October 2014
17:45

Saudi Arabia	5–0	Palestine

Suheim Bin Hamad Stadium, Doha
Referee: Noureddine El-Jaafari (Morocco)

24 October 2014
14:15

Sudan	2–0	Palestine

Suheim Bin Hamad Stadium, Doha
Referee: Mohamad Darwich (Lebanon)
24 October 2014
16:45

Iraq	0–0	Saudi Arabia

Suheim Bin Hamad Stadium, Doha
Referee: Mustapha Ghorbal (Algeria)

27 October 2014
16:45

Palestine	0–2	Iraq

Suheim Bin Hamad Stadium, Doha
Referee: Mohamad Darwich (Lebanon)
27 October 2014
16:45

Saudi Arabia	1–1	Sudan

Suheim Bin Hamad Stadium, Doha
Referee: Noureddine El-Jaafari (Morocco)

== Knockout stage ==
Semi-finals
30 October - Doha
Qatar	1
Saudi Arabia	4
30 October - Doha
Iraq	4
Djibouti	0

Final
2 November - ...
Saudi Arabia	0
Iraq	2
Third place
2 November - ...
Qatar	3 (2)
Djibouti	3 (3)

=== Semi-finals ===
30 October 2014
16:10

Qatar	1–4	Saudi Arabia

Suheim Bin Hamad Stadium, Doha
Referee: Mustapha Ghorbal (Algeria)
30 October 2014
19:00

Iraq	4–0	Djibouti

Suheim Bin Hamad Stadium, Doha
Referee: Mohamad Darwich (Lebanon)

=== Third place playoff ===
2 November 2014
16:10

Qatar	3–3 (a.e.t.)	Djibouti
Penalties
	2–3

Suheim Bin Hamad Stadium, Doha
Referee: Wathik Mohammed Abdallah Al-Baag (Iraq)

=== Final ===
2 November 2014
19:00

Saudi Arabia	0–2	Iraq
		A. Khudeir 70'; S. Musa 75'

Suheim Bin Hamad Stadium, Doha
Attendance: 500
Referee: Jasem Ahmad (Kuwait)

== Winners ==
2014 Arab U-17 Championship

Iraq
First title
