= 2013 GCC U-17 Championship =

Tournament details
- Host country: Qatar
- Dates: 3–12 September
- Teams: 6 (from UAFA confederations)

Final positions
- Champions: United Arab Emirates (4th title)
- Runners-up: Oman
- Third place: Bahrain
- Fourth place: Qatar

Tournament statistics
- Matches played: 11
- Goals scored: 27 (2.45 per match)

The 2013 GCC U-17 Championship took place in Qatar from 3–12 September. It was the 10th edition of the tournament.

== Groups ==
Group A	Group B
Kuwait; Oman; Qatar (Hosts)	Bahrain; Saudi Arabia; United Arab Emirates

== Group stage ==
=== Group A ===
Team	Pld	W	D	L	GF	GA	GD	Pts
Oman	2	2	0	0	3	0	+3	6
Qatar	2	1	0	2	4	2	+2	3
Kuwait	2	0	0	2	1	6	-5	0

3 September 2013
13:00

Qatar	4 - 1	Kuwait

ASPIRE Academy, Doha
Referee: Mshari Al-Mshari (Saudi Arabia)

5 September 2013
15:45

Kuwait	0 - 2	Oman

ASPIRE Academy, Doha
Referee: Ahmed Salem (UAE)

7 September 2013
15:45

Qatar	0 - 1	Oman

ASPIRE Academy, Doha
Referee: Hussain Al-Bahar (Bahrain)

=== Group B ===
Team	Pld	W	D	L	GF	GA	GD	Pts
United Arab Emirates	2	2	0	0	7	3	+4	6
Bahrain	2	1	0	1	2	4	-2	3
Saudi Arabia	2	0	0	2	2	4	-2	0

3 September 2013
15:45

United Arab Emirates	3 - 2	Saudi Arabia

ASPIRE Academy, Doha
Referee: Amaar Ashknani (Kuwait)

5 September 2013
13:00

Bahrain	1 - 0	Saudi Arabia

ASPIRE Academy, Doha
Referee: Saoud Alathba (Qatar)

7 September 2013
13:00

United Arab Emirates	4 - 1	Bahrain

ASPIRE Academy, Doha
Referee: Muhanna Al-Wakesh (Oman)

== 5th Place ==
9 September 2013

Saudi Arabia	1 - 1	Kuwait
Penalties
	3 - 0

ASPIRE Academy, Doha

== Semi finals ==
10 September 2013

Oman	0 - 0	Bahrain
Penalties
	4 - 3

ASPIRE Academy, Doha
Referee: Amaar Ashknani (Kuwait)

10 September 2013

United Arab Emirates	0 - 0	Qatar
Penalties
	5 - 4

ASPIRE Academy, Doha
Referee: Mshari Al-Mshari (Saudi Arabia)

== Third place playoff ==
12 September 2013

Bahrain	2 - 0	Qatar

ASPIRE Academy, Doha
Referee: Muhanna Al-Wakesh (Oman)

== Final ==
12 September 2013

Oman	2 - 2	United Arab Emirates
Penalties
	0 - 3

ASPIRE Academy, Doha
Referee: Saoud Alathba (Qatar)

2013 Gulf Cup U-17 winners

United Arab Emirates
4th title
