= 2012 GCC U-17 Championship =

Tournament details
- Host country: Kuwait
- Dates: 22 September – 1 October
- Teams: 6 (from UAFA confederations)

Final positions
- Champions: Saudi Arabia (4th title)
- Runners-up: Qatar
- Third place: United Arab Emirates
- Fourth place: Kuwait

Tournament statistics
- Matches played: 10
- Goals scored: 26 (2.6 per match)

The 2012 GCC U-17 Championship will take place in Kuwait from 22 September – 1 October. It is the 9th edition of the tournament.

== Groups ==
The draw for the championships took place on 30 June 2012.

Group A	Group B
Bahrain; Kuwait (Hosts); Qatar	Oman; Saudi Arabia; United Arab Emirates

== Group stage ==
=== Group A ===
Team	Pld	W	D	L	GF	GA	GD	Pts
Qatar	2	1	1	0	5	1	+4	4
Kuwait	2	1	1	0	2	1	+1	4
Bahrain	2	0	0	2	0	5	-5	0

22 September 2012

Qatar	1 – 1	Kuwait

24 September 2012

Kuwait	1 – 0	Bahrain

26 September 2012

Bahrain	0 – 4	Qatar

=== Group B ===
Team	Pld	W	D	L	GF	GA	GD	Pts
Saudi Arabia	2	1	1	0	2	1	+1	4
United Arab Emirates	2	1	0	1	5	2	+3	3
Oman	2	0	1	1	0	4	-4	1

22 September 2012

Oman	0 – 4	United Arab Emirates

24 September 2012

United Arab Emirates	1 – 2	Saudi Arabia

26 September 2012

Saudi Arabia	0 – 0	Oman

== Semi finals ==
29 September 2012

United Arab Emirates	2 – 3	Qatar

29 September 2012

Saudi Arabia	5 – 0	Kuwait

== Third place playoff ==
1 October 2012

United Arab Emirates	1 – 0	Kuwait

== Final ==
1 October 2012

Qatar	0 – 1	Saudi Arabia

== Winners ==
GCC U-17 Championship 2012 winners

Saudi Arabia
4th title
