= AFC U-17 Asian Cup =

- Organiser(s): AFC
- Founded: 1985; 41 years ago
- Region: Asia (including Australia)
- Teams: 16
- Current champions: Japan (5th title)
- Most championships: Japan (5 titles)
- 2027 AFC U-17 Asian Cup

The AFC U-17 Asian Cup, formerly known as the AFC U-16 Championship and AFC U-17 Championship, is a football competition, organised by the Asian Football Confederation (AFC) held once every two years for Asian under-17 teams that also serves as a qualification tournament for the FIFA U-17 World Cup. The top 8 countries qualify to participate in the FIFA U-17 World Cup. Up to 2000, the tournament was for U-16 teams. Between 2002 and 2006 it was held as an under-17 tournament. Between 2008 and 2020, it was switched back to a U-16 Championship. The AFC then returned it to an under-17 tournament starting from 2023. Moreover, the tournament would also be rebranded from the "AFC U-16 Championship" to the "AFC U-17 Asian Cup".

On 24 May 2024, AFC announced that the tournament will be held annually from 2026.

== Results ==
Tournament names

- 1985–2000: AFC U-16 Championship
- 2002–2006: AFC U-17 Championship
- 2008–2020: AFC U-16 Championship
- 2023–present: AFC U-17 Asian Cup

Edition	Year	Host	Final			Third place match			Number of teams
Edition	Year	Host	Champions	Score	Runners-up	Third place	Score	Fourth place	Number of teams
1	1985	Qatar	Saudi Arabia	0–0 (a.e.t.) (4–3 p)	Qatar	Iraq	1–0	Thailand	7
2	1986	Qatar	South Korea	0–0 (5–4 p)	Qatar	Saudi Arabia	2–0	North Korea	8
3	1988	Thailand	Saudi Arabia	2–0	Bahrain	China	1–1 (4–3 p)	Iraq	10
4	1990	United Arab Emirates	Qatar	2–0	United Arab Emirates	China	5–0	Indonesia	7
5	1992	Saudi Arabia	China	2–2 (a.e.t.) (8–7 p)	Qatar	Saudi Arabia	2–1	North Korea	8
6	1994	Qatar	Japan	1–0 (a.e.t.)	Qatar	Oman	3–2	Bahrain	10
7	1996	Thailand	Oman	1–0	Thailand	Bahrain	0–0 (4–1 p)	Japan	10
8	1998	Qatar	Thailand	1–1 (a.e.t.) (3–2 p)	Qatar	Bahrain	5–1	South Korea	10
9	2000	Vietnam	Oman	1–0	Iran	Japan	4–2	Vietnam	10
10	2002	United Arab Emirates	South Korea	1–1 (5–3 p)	Yemen	China	1–0	Uzbekistan	12
11	2004	Japan	China	1–0	North Korea	Qatar	2–1	Iran	16
12	2006	Singapore	Japan	4–2 (a.e.t.)	North Korea	Tajikistan	3–3 (a.e.t.) (5–4 p)	Syria	15
Edition	Year	Host	Final			Losing semi-finalists^{1}			
Edition	Year	Host	Champions	Score	Runners-up	Losing semi-finalists^{1}			
13	2008	Uzbekistan	Iran	2–1	South Korea	Japan and United Arab Emirates			16
14	2010	Uzbekistan	North Korea	2–0	Uzbekistan	Australia and Japan			16
15	2012	Iran	Uzbekistan	1–1 (3–1 p)	Japan	Iran and Iraq			16
16	2014	Thailand	North Korea	2–1	South Korea	Australia and Syria			16
17	2016	India	Iraq	0–0 (4–3 p)	Iran	Japan and North Korea			16
18	2018	Malaysia	Japan	1–0	Tajikistan	Australia and South Korea			16
—	2020	Bahrain	Cancelled due to COVID-19 pandemic						
19	2023	Thailand	Japan	3–0	South Korea	Iran and Uzbekistan			16
20	2025	Saudi Arabia	Uzbekistan	2–0	Saudi Arabia	North Korea and South Korea			16
21	2026	Saudi Arabia	Japan	3–2	China	Australia and Uzbekistan			15
22	2027	Uzbekistan							
23	2028	Saudi Arabia							
24	2029	Saudi Arabia							

Notes

- ^{1} No third-place match was played.

== Most successful national teams ==
Team	Champions	Runners-up	Third place	Fourth place	Semi-finalists	Total
Japan	5 (1994, 2006, 2018, 2023, 2026)	1 (2012)	1 (2000)	1 (1996)	3 (2008, 2010, 2016)	11
South Korea	2 (1986, 2002)	3 (2008, 2014, 2023)	—	1 (1998)	2 (2018, 2025)	8
North Korea	2 (2010, 2014)	2 (2004, 2006)	—	2 (1986, 1992)	2 (2016, 2025)	8
China	2 (1992, 2004)	1 (2026)	3 (1988, 1990, 2002)	—	—	6
Saudi Arabia	2 (1985, 1988)	1 (**2025**)	2 (1986, **1992**)	—	—	6
Uzbekistan	2 (2012, 2025)	1 (**2010**)	—	1 (2002)	2 (2023, 2026)	6
Oman	2 (1996, 2000)	—	1 (1994)	—	—	3
Qatar	1 (1990)	5 (**1985**, **1986**, 1992, **1994**, **1998**)	1 (2004)	—	—	7
Iran	1 (2008)	2 (2000, 2016)	—	1 (2004)	2 (**2012**, 2023)	6
Thailand	1 (1998)	1 (**1996**)	—	1 (1985)	—	3
Iraq	1 (2016)	—	1 (1985)	1 (1988)	1 (2012)	4
Bahrain	—	1 (1988)	2 (1996, 1998)	1 (1994)	—	4
Tajikistan	—	1 (2018)	1 (2006)	—	—	2
United Arab Emirates	—	1 (**1990**)	—	—	1 (2008)	2
Yemen	—	1 (2002)	—	—	—	1
Syria	—	—	—	1 (2006)	1 (2014)	2
Indonesia	—	—	—	1 (1990)	—	1
Vietnam	—	—	—	1 (**2000**)	—	1
Australia	—	—	—	—	4 (2010, 2014, 2018, 2026)	4
Total (20 editions)	21	21	12	12	18	84

Note:

- Results as hosts **in bold**.

== Awards ==
Tournament	Best player	Top goal scorer	Goals	Fair play award
2002 United Arab Emirates	(South Korea) Cha Gi-suk	Unknown		South Korea
2004 Japan	(China) Wang Dalei	(Qatar) Yusef Ahmed	7	Unknown
2006 Singapore	(Japan) Yoichiro Kakitani	(Syria) Mohamad Jaafar	6	Japan
2008 Uzbekistan	(South Korea) Lee Jong-ho	(Iran) Kaveh Rezaei	6	South Korea
2010 Uzbekistan	(Uzbekistan) Timur Khakimov	(Uzbekistan) Timur Khakimov	5	Not awarded
2012 Iran	(Japan) Taro Sugimoto	(South Korea) Hwang Hee-chan	5	Not awarded
2014 Thailand	(South Korea) Lee Seung-woo	(South Korea) Lee Seung-woo	5	South Korea
2016 India	(Iraq) Mohammed Dawood	(Iraq) Mohammed Dawood	6	Iraq
2018 Malaysia	(Japan) Jun Nishikawa	(Malaysia) Luqman Hakim	5	Japan
2023 Thailand	(Japan) Gaku Nawata	(Japan) Gaku Nawata	5	Japan
2025 Saudi Arabia	(Uzbekistan) Sadriddin Khasanov	(Uzbekistan) Asilbek Aliev	5	Saudi Arabia
2026 Saudi Arabia	(Japan) Maki Kitahara	(Japan) Maki Kitahara	6	Saudi Arabia

== Participating nations ==
Legend:

- 1st – Champions
- 2nd – Runners-up
- 3rd – Third place
- 4th – Fourth place
- SF – Semi-finalists
- QF – Quarter-finals
- GS – Group stage
- Q – Qualified for upcoming tournament
- DQ – Disqualified
- •• – Qualified but withdrew
- • – Did not qualify
- × – Did not enter
- × – Withdrew / Banned / Entry not accepted by FIFA
- XX — Country not affiliated to AFC at that time
- XX — Country did not exist or national team was inactive
- – Hosts
- – Not affiliated to FIFA

Nation	1985	1986	1988	1990	1992	1994	1996	1998	2000	2002	2004	2006	2008	2010	2012	2014	2016	2018	2023	2025	2026	2027	Total
Afghanistan	×	×	×	×	×	×	×	×	×	×	•	×	×	•	DQ	•	•	GS	GS	GS	•	•	3
Australia												•	QF	SF	QF	SF	GS	SF	QF	GS	SF	Q	10
Bahrain	•	GS	2nd	•	GS	4th	3rd	3rd	•	•	•	•	GS	•	•	•	•	•	•	•	•	•	7
Bangladesh	×	GS	•	•	GS	•	•	GS	GS	×	GS	GS	DQ	•	•	×	•	•	•	•	•	•	6
China	GS	•	3rd	3rd	1st	GS	GS	•	GS	3rd	1st	QF	GS	GS	GS	GS	•	•	GS	GS	2nd	Q	18
Hong Kong	×	•	•	•	×	•	•	•	•	•	•	•	•	•	•	GS	•	•	•	•	•	•	1
India	•	•	•	GS	•	•	GS	•	•	QF	GS	•	GS	•	GS	•	GS	QF	GS	•	GS	Q	11
Indonesia	×	GS	GS	4th	•	•	•	•	•	•	•	•	GS	GS	•	•	×	QF	•	QF	GS	Q	8
Iran	×	•	•	•	•	•	GS	GS	2nd	×	4th	QF	1st	GS	SF	QF	2nd	GS	SF	GS	•	Q	13
Iraq	3rd	•	4th	×	×	GS	×	GS	•	•	QF	GS	DQ	QF	SF	•	1st	GS	•	•	•	Q	11
Japan	GS	•	GS	×	•	1st	4th	GS	3rd	GS	GS	1st	SF	SF	2nd	QF	SF	1st	1st	QF	1st	Q	19
Jordan	×	•	•	GS	•	•	•	•	•	•	•	•	•	QF	×	•	•	GS	•	•	•	•	3
Kuwait	••	•	•	•	•	•	•	•	GS	•	QF	•	•	GS	QF	GS	×	×	•	•	•	•	5
Kyrgyzstan						×	×	•	•	•	•	•	DQ	•	•	•	GS	•	•	•	•	•	1
Laos	×	×	×	×	×	×	•	•	•	•	GS	DQ	•	•	GS	•	•	•	GS	•	•	•	3
Lebanon	×	×	×	×	×	×	×	×	•	×	•	•	•	•	×	•	•	•	•	×	•	Q	1
Malaysia	×	•	•	•	•	•	×	•	•	•	GS	•	GS	•	•	QF	GS	GS	GS	•	•	•	6
Myanmar	×	GS	×	×	×	×	×	•	GS	GS	•	GS	×	•	•	•	•	•	•	•	GS	•	5
Nepal	•	×	•	•	•	×	×	•	GS	×	•	GS	•	•	•	GS	×	•	•	•	•	•	3
North Korea	×	4th	GS	•	4th	•	•	GS	×	•	2nd	2nd	DQ	1st	GS	1st	SF	QF	×	SF	×	DQ	12
Oman	×	•	•	•	×	3rd	1st	GS	1st	×	QF	•	•	GS	GS	GS	QF	QF	•	GS	•	•	11
Pakistan	×	×	×	×	•	×	×	•	•	GS	×	•	•	•	•	•	×	×	×	×	•	•	1
Qatar	2nd	2nd	GS	1st	2nd	2nd	•	2nd	•	QF	3rd	•	•	•	•	GS	•	•	GS	•	GS	Q	13
Saudi Arabia	1st	3rd	1st	••	3rd	GS	•	•	•	•	•	QF	QF	•	GS	GS	GS	•	QF	2nd	QF	Q	14
Singapore	•	•	•	•	•	•	•	•	•	•	•	GS	GS	•	•	•	•	•	•	•	•	•	2
South Korea	•	1st	GS	GS	•	GS	GS	4th	•	1st	QF	QF	2nd	•	QF	2nd	GS	SF	2nd	SF	QF	Q	18
South Yemen	GS	•	•																				1
Syria	•	×	×	×	×	×	×	×	×	QF	×	4th	QF	QF	QF	SF	•	•	•	•	•	Q	7
Tajikistan						×	×	•	•	×	•	3rd	DQ	GS	•	•	•	2nd	GS	QF	QF	Q	7
Thailand	4th	•	GS	•	GS	•	2nd	1st	GS	×	GS	•	•	•	GS	GS	GS	GS	QF	GS	GS	•	14
Timor-Leste											×	×	×	GS	•	×	•	•	×	×	•	•	1
Turkmenistan						×	×	•	•	•	•	•	GS	•	×	•	•	×	•	•	•	•	1
United Arab Emirates	•	•	•	2nd	GS	GS	•	•	•	QF	•	•	SF	QF	•	•	QF	×	•	QF	GS	•	9
Uzbekistan						GS	GS	•	•	4th	GS	•	QF	2nd	1st	QF	QF	•	SF	1st	SF	Q	13
Vietnam	×	×	×	×	×	×	×	×	4th	GS	GS	GS	•	GS	•	•	QF	GS	GS	GS	QF	Q	11
Yemen				×	•	•	•	×	×	2nd	•	GS	DQ	•	GS	•	GS	GS	QF	GS	GS	Q	9

== Summary (1985–2026) ==
Rank	Team	Part	M	W	D	L	GF	GA	GD	Points
1	Japan	18	86	54	14	18	215	98	+117	176
2	South Korea	17	78	42	17	19	167	81	+86	143
3	China	17	71	31	17	23	123	92	+31	110
4	Iran	13	59	30	11	18	111	67	+44	101
5	Qatar	12	52	28	12	12	85	52	+33	96
6	Uzbekistan	12	56	27	12	17	99	99	0	93
7	North Korea	12	58	24	16	18	95	72	+23	88
8	Saudi Arabia	14	58	24	11	19	95	64	+31	83
9	Oman	11	46	20	7	19	79	68	+11	67
10	Iraq	10	44	19	9	16	61	49	+12	66
11	Australia	9	37	20	4	13	73	56	+17	64
12	Thailand	14	53	17	1	28	73	89	−16	59
13	Bahrain	7	33	13	8	12	53	46	+7	47
14	United Arab Emirates	9	32	11	10	14	57	62	–5	43
15	Syria	6	27	10	9	8	39	33	+6	39
16	Tajikistan	6	26	9	8	9	36	55	−19	35
17	Yemen	9	30	9	7	14	35	42	−7	34
18	Vietnam	10	35	8	8	19	40	80	−40	32
19	India	10	32	6	7	19	36	75	−39	25
20	Indonesia	8	28	6	5	17	25	64	−36	23
21	Malaysia	6	19	5	2	12	21	41	−20	17
22	Kuwait	6	22	4	3	15	28	50	−22	15
23	Bangladesh	6	20	3	3	14	16	59	−43	12
24	Myanmar	5	15	2	3	10	14	43	−29	9
25	Jordan	3	10	1	4	5	8	23	−15	7
26	Laos	3	9	2	0	7	11	25	−14	6
27	Nepal	3	10	1	2	7	6	31	−25	5
28	Kyrgyzstan	1	3	1	0	2	2	11	−9	3
29	Afghanistan	3	9	1	0	8	4	34	−30	3
30	South Yemen	1	3	0	2	1	4	5	−1	2
31	Singapore	2	6	0	2	4	3	18	−15	2
32	Pakistan	1	3	0	1	2	2	6	−4	1
33	Hong Kong	1	3	0	0	3	0	6	−6	0
34	Timor-Leste	1	3	0	0	3	1	9	−8	0
35	Turkmenistan	1	3	0	0	3	1	12	−11	0

== Men's U-17 World Cup qualifiers ==
Legend

- 1st – Champions
- 2nd – Runners-up
- 3rd – Third place
- 4th – Fourth place
- QF – Quarter-finals
- R16 – Round of 16
- R32 – Round of 32
- GS – Group stage
- – Hosts
- – Not affiliated to AFC
- Q – Qualified for upcoming tournament

Team	(China) 1985	(Canada) 1987	(Scotland) 1989	(Italy) 1991	(Japan) 1993	(Ecuador) 1995	(Egypt) 1997	(New Zealand) 1999	(Trinidad and Tobago) 2001	(Finland) 2003	(Peru) 2005	(South Korea) 2007	(Nigeria) 2009	(Mexico) 2011	(United Arab Emirates) 2013	(Chile) 2015	(India) 2017	(Brazil) 2019	(Indonesia) 2023	(Qatar) 2025	(Qatar) 2026	Total
Australia	OFC member													R16		R16		R16			Q	4
Bahrain			4th				GS															2
China	QF		GS	GS	GS					GS	QF										Q	7
India																	GS					1
Indonesia																			GS	GS		2
Iran									GS				R16		R16		QF		R16			5
Iraq															GS		R16					2
Japan					QF	GS			GS			GS	GS	QF	R16		R16	R16	R16	QF	Q	12
North Korea											QF	R16		GS		R16	GS			R16		6
Oman						4th	QF		GS													3
Qatar	GS	QF		4th	GS	GS		QF			GS									GS	Q	9
Saudi Arabia	QF	GS	1st																	GS	Q	5
South Korea		QF								GS		GS	QF			R16		QF	GS	R32	Q	9
Syria												R16				GS						2
Tajikistan	Part of Soviet Union											R16						GS		GS	Q	4
Thailand							GS	GS														2
United Arab Emirates				GS									R16		GS					GS		4
Uzbekistan	Part of Soviet Union													QF	R16				QF	R16	Q	5
Vietnam																					Q	1
Yemen										GS												1

== See also ==
- AFC U-17 Women's Asian Cup
- FIFA U-17 World Cup
- AFC U-20 Asian Cup
- AFC U-23 Asian Cup
