= Ardiles Rumbiak =

Indonesian footballer

Personal information
- Full name: Ardiles Rumbiak
- Date of birth: 1 May 1986 (age 40)
- Place of birth: Biak Numfor, Indonesia
- Height: 1.72 m (5 ft 7 1/2 in)
- Positions: Midfielder; right back

Team information
- Current team: Papua Football Academy (head coach)

Senior career*
Years	Team	Apps	(Gls)
2008–2009	Persipura Jayapura	27	(0)
2010–2011	Sriwijaya	6	(0)
2011–2013	PSBS Biak Numfor	22	(1)
Total		55	(1)

Managerial career
- 2018–2019: Persemi Mimika
- 2021–2022: Belitong
- 2022–: Papua Football Academy
- * Club domestic league appearances and goals

Ardiles Rumbiak (born 1 May 1986) is an Indonesian professional football coach and former player who is currently head coach of Papua Football Academy.

== Honours ==
=== Head coach ===
Belitong

- Liga 3 (Indonesia): 2021
