= Saudi Arabia national under-17 football team =

Saudi Arabia Under-17
- Nickname(s): الصقور الخضر (The Green Falcons)
- Association: SAFF
- Confederation: AFC (Asia)
- Head coach: Mário Jorge
- Home stadium: King Fahd Sports City
- FIFA code: KSA
First colours	Second colours

AFC U-17 Asian Cup
- Appearances: 12 (first in 1985)
- Best result: Champions (1985, 1988)

FIFA U-17 World Cup
- Appearances: 4 (first in 1985)
- Best result: Champions (1989)

The Saudi Arabia national under-17 football team (Arabic: المنتخب السعودي لكرة القدم تحت 17 سنة), also known as Saudi Arabia Under-17 or Saudi Arabia junior team, represents Saudi Arabia in international association football competitions in AFC U-17 Championship and FIFA U-17 World Cup, as well as any other under-17 international football tournaments.

== History ==
The team won the 1989 FIFA U-16 World Championship and became the first Asian team to win a FIFA tournament. As of November 2025, they also became the only Asian men's football team to win any FIFA tournaments.

== Results and fixtures ==
The following is a list of match results in the last 12 months, as well as any future matches that have been scheduled.

Win Draw Loss Fixture

== Coaching staff ==
Position	Name	Ref.
Head coach	(Brazil) Mário Jorge	
Assistant coaches	(Australia) Brad Maloney	
Assistant coaches	(Brazil) Diego Ribas da Cunha	
Goalkeeping coach	(Brazil) Diego Alves	
Technical coach	(Saudi Arabia) Osama Hawsawi	
Fitness coach	(Italy) Sebastian Giovinco	
Fitness coach	(Brazil) Luiz Rhodolfo Dini Gaioto	
Physiotherapist	(Saudi Arabia) Dr. Naqeeb Khan	
Team Anaylst	(Saudi Arabia) Mohammad Al-Shalhoub	

== Current squad ==
The following players were called up for the 2025 AFC U-17 Asian Cup between 3–20 April 2025.

Caps and goals correct as of 3 April 2025, after the match against China

No.	Pos.	Player	Date of birth (age)	Caps	Goals	Club
1	GK	Mohammed Bokhulaif	21 March 2008 (age 18)	0	0	(Saudi Arabian Football Federation) Al-Fateh
21	GK	Abdulrahman Al-Otaibi	5 February 2008 (age 18)	3	0	(Saudi Arabian Football Federation) Al-Nassr
22	GK	Wafi Al-Aklabi	11 February 2008 (age 18)	0	0	(Saudi Arabian Football Federation) Al-Qadsiah
2	DF	Yazeed Al-Dosari	6 March 2008 (age 18)	3	0	(Saudi Arabian Football Federation) Al-Shabab
3	DF	Nassar Al-Fihani	21 May 2008 (age 18)	3	0	(Saudi Arabian Football Federation) Al-Ettifaq
4	DF	Turki Naji	29 December 2008 (age 17)	0	0	(Saudi Arabian Football Federation) Al-Shabab
5	DF	Moayad Saleem	9 March 2008 (age 18)	0	0	(Saudi Arabian Football Federation) Al-Faisaly
12	DF	Adel Hibah	4 February 2008 (age 18)	3	1	(Saudi Arabian Football Federation) Al-Hilal
14	DF	Abdulaziz Asiri	2 January 2008 (age 18)	0	0	(Saudi Arabian Football Federation) Al-Hilal
15	DF	Mohammed Al-Qarni	24 May 2008 (age 18)	0	0	(Saudi Arabian Football Federation) Al-Ittihad
20	DF	Abubaker Saeed	18 December 2008 (age 17)	3	0	(Saudi Arabian Football Federation) Al-Qadsiah
6	MF	Saeed Al-Dosari	30 January 2008 (age 18)	3	0	Unknown
7	MF	Al-Waleed Al-Awfi	5 December 2008 (age 17)	0	0	(Saudi Arabian Football Federation) Al-Ittihad
16	MF	Habib Al-Antif	26 June 2008 (age 18)	1	0	(Saudi Arabian Football Federation) Al-Nassr
18	MF	Abdulaziz Al-Fawaz	28 March 2008 (age 18)	3	0	(Saudi Arabian Football Federation) Al-Fateh
23	MF	Maher Tawashi	2 April 2008 (age 18)	2	0	(Saudi Arabian Football Federation) Al-Nassr
8	FW	Thari Saeed	25 June 2008 (age 18)	2	0	(Saudi Arabian Football Federation) Al-Hilal
9	FW	Abdulhadi Matari	28 February 2008 (age 18)	3	2	(Saudi Arabian Football Federation) Al-Ittihad
10	FW	Abdulrahman Sufyani	15 April 2008 (age 18)	3	2	(Saudi Arabian Football Federation) Al-Nassr
11	FW	Sabri Dahal	29 February 2008 (age 18)	3	1	(Saudi Arabian Football Federation) Al-Fayha
13	FW	Osama Al-Daghmah	25 June 2008 (age 18)	3	1	(Saudi Arabian Football Federation) Al-Ahli
17	FW	Salem Abdullah	7 April 2008 (age 18)	2	1	(Saudi Arabian Football Federation) Al-Ahli
19	FW	Mukhtar Barnawi	11 March 2008 (age 18)	2	0	(Saudi Arabian Football Federation) Al-Hilal

== Competitions record ==
=== FIFA U-17 World Cup ===
Host/Year	Round	Position	Pld	W	D	L	GF	GA
(China) 1985	Quarter-finals	6th	4	2	1	1	8	4
(Canada) 1987	Group stage	9th	3	1	1	1	2	1
(Scotland) 1989	Champions	1st	6	2	4	0	8	6
(Italy) 1991	Did not qualify							
(Japan) 1993	Did not qualify							
(Ecuador) 1995	Did not qualify							
(Egypt) 1997	Did not qualify							
(New Zealand) 1999	Did not qualify							
(Trinidad and Tobago) 2001	Did not qualify							
(Finland) 2003	Did not qualify							
(Peru) 2005	Did not qualify							
(South Korea) 2007	Did not qualify							
(Nigeria) 2009	Did not qualify							
(Mexico) 2011	Did not qualify							
(United Arab Emirates) 2013	Did not qualify							
(Chile) 2015	Did not qualify							
(India) 2017	Did not qualify							
(Brazil) 2019	Did not qualify							
(Indonesia) 2023	Did not qualify							
(Qatar) 2025	Group stage	34th	3	1	0	2	3	5
(Qatar) 2026	In progress	TBD	1	0	0	1	2	3
Total:4/20	1 Title		17	6	6	5	23	19

=== AFC U-17 Asian Cup ===
Host/Year	Round	Position	Pld	W	D	L	GF	GA	Pld	W	D	L	GF	GA
(Qatar) 1985	Champions	1st	4	2	1	1	5	3	3	2	1	0	3	2
(Qatar) 1986	Third place	3rd	5	3	0	2	8	3	Qualified as defending champions					
(Thailand) 1988	Champions	1st	6	5	1	0	17	3	5	?	?	?	?	?
(United Arab Emirates) 1990	withdrew								?	?	?	?	?	?
(Saudi Arabia) 1992	Third place	3rd	5	2	2	1	7	5	Qualified as host					
(Qatar) 1994	Group stage	6th	4	2	0	2	8	4	?	?	?	?	?	?
(Thailand) 1996	Did not qualify								?	?	?	?	?	?
(Qatar) 1998	Did not qualify								2	0	0	2	1	4
(Vietnam) 2000	Did not qualify								3	0	2	1	3	5
(United Arab Emirates) 2002	Did not qualify								2	0	1	1	0	1
(Japan) 2004	Did not qualify								2	0	0	2	0	2
(Singapore) 2006	Quarter-finals	6th	3	2	0	1	8	3	2	2	0	0	8	1
(Uzbekistan) 2008	Quarter-finals	6th	4	1	1	2	6	6	5	3	0	2	13	7
(Uzbekistan) 2010	Did not qualify								4	2	1	1	3	1
(Iran) 2012	Group stage	15th	3	0	0	3	1	5	3	1	1	1	5	3
(Thailand) 2014	Group stage	13th	3	0	2	1	2	3	3	2	1	0	4	1
(India) 2016	Group stage	11th	3	0	1	2	6	9	2	2	0	0	11	3
(Malaysia) 2018	Did not qualify								4	3	0	1	15	2
(Thailand) 2023	Quarter-finals	5th	4	3	0	1	7	2	4	4	0	0	19	2
(Saudi Arabia) 2025	Runners-up	2nd	6	2	2	2	8	10	Qualified as host					
(Saudi Arabia) 2026	Quarter-finals	5th	4	2	1	1	12	8	Qualified as host					
(Uzbekistan) 2027	Qualified													
(Saudi Arabia) 2028	Qualified as host													
(Saudi Arabia) 2029	Qualified as host													
Total:12/23	2 Titles		54	24	11	19	95	64	44	21	7	11	85	34

=== Arab Cup U-17 ===
Host/Year	Round	Position	Pld	W	D	L	GF	GA
(Saudi Arabia) 2011	Champions	1st	5	5	0	0	17	7
(Tunisia) 2012	Group stage	7th	2	1	0	1	5	5
(Qatar) 2014	Runners-up	2nd	5	2	2	1	10	4
(Algeria) 2022	Semi-finals	–	5	3	1	1	14	7
Total	4/4	Best: 1 title	17	11	3	3	44	23

== Head-to-head record ==
The following table shows Saudi Arabia's head-to-head record in the FIFA U-17 World Cup and AFC U-17 Asian Cup.

=== In FIFA U-17 World Cup ===
Opponent	Pld	W	D	L	GF	GA	GD	Win %
Australia	1	0	0	1	0	1	−1	0.00
Austria	1	0	0	1	0	1	−1	0.00
Bahrain	1	1	0	0	1	0	+1	100.00
Brazil	2	0	1	1	1	2	−1	0.00
Colombia	1	1	0	0	1	0	+1	100.00
Costa Rica	1	1	0	0	4	1	+3	100.00
France	1	1	0	0	2	0	+2	100.00
Guinea	1	0	1	0	2	2	+0	0.00
Haiti	0	0	0	0	0	0	+0	—
Italy	1	1	0	0	3	1	+2	100.00
Mali	1	0	0	1	0	2	−2	0.00
New Zealand	1	1	0	0	3	2	+1	100.00
Nigeria	2	0	2	0	0	0	+0	0.00
Portugal	1	0	1	0	2	2	+0	0.00
Scotland	1	0	1	0	2	2	+0	0.00
Uruguay	1	0	0	1	2	3	−1	0.00
Total	17	6	6	5	23	19	+4	35.29

=== In AFC U-17 Asian Cup ===
Opponent	Pld	W	D	L	GF	GA	GD	Win %
Australia	2	1	0	1	3	3	+0	50.00
Bahrain	3	1	2	0	2	0	+2	33.33
Bangladesh	2	2	0	0	5	0	+5	100.00
China	5	2	1	2	8	8	+0	40.00
India	1	0	1	0	3	3	+0	0.00
Indonesia	2	2	0	0	9	1	+8	100.00
Iran	2	0	0	2	3	5	−2	0.00
Iraq	1	1	0	0	2	1	+1	100.00
Japan	4	1	1	2	5	6	−1	25.00
Myanmar	1	1	0	0	5	0	+5	100.00
North Korea	5	3	1	1	7	4	+3	60.00
Oman	1	0	0	1	0	1	−1	0.00
Qatar	5	1	2	2	3	5	−2	20.00
South Korea	4	1	1	2	7	4	+3	25.00
Syria	2	0	1	1	1	2	−1	0.00
Tajikistan	1	1	0	0	2	0	+2	100.00
Thailand	3	3	0	0	7	2	+5	100.00
Turkmenistan	1	1	0	0	4	0	+4	100.00
United Arab Emirates	1	0	0	1	1	3	−2	0.00
Uzbekistan	4	1	0	3	6	8	−2	25.00
Total	50	22	10	18	83	56	+27	44.00

== Previous squads ==
=== FIFA U-16 World Championship squads ===
- 1985 FIFA U-16 World Championship
- 1987 FIFA U-16 World Championship
- 1989 FIFA U-16 World Championship

== Honours ==
FIFA U-17 World Cup

- Winners (1) : 1989

AFC U-17 Asian Cup

- Winners (2) : 1985, 1988
- Runners-up (1) : 2025
- Third place (2) : 1986, 1992

Arab Cup U-17

- Winners (1) : 2011
- Runners-up (1) : 2014

AGCFF U-17 Gulf Cup

- Winners (6) : 2003, 2008, 2011, 2012, 2016, 2025

== See also ==
- Saudi Arabia national football team
- Saudi Arabia national under-23 football team
- Saudi Arabia national under-20 football team
