= 2010 GCC U-17 Championship =

Tournament details
- Host country: Kuwait
- Dates: 21–30 September
- Teams: 6 (from UAFA confederations)

Final positions
- Champions: United Arab Emirates (3rd title)
- Runners-up: Saudi Arabia
- Third place: Qatar
- Fourth place: Oman

Tournament statistics
- Matches played: 11
- Goals scored: 32 (2.91 per match)

The 2010 GCC U-17 Championship took place in Kuwait between 21 and 30 September 2010. The GCC U-17 Championship took place for the sixth time in which six nations have entered.

UAE were the defending champion and won the event for the third time.

== Groups ==
Group A	Group B
Saudi Arabia; United Arab Emirates; Bahrain	Oman; Qatar; Kuwait (Hosts)

== Group stage ==
=== Group A ===
Team	Pld	W	D	L	GF	GA	GD	Pts
Saudi Arabia	2	1	1	0	2	1	+1	4
United Arab Emirates	2	1	0	1	4	2	+2	3
Bahrain	2	0	1	1	0	3	−3	1

All times are local (UTC+3)

21 September 2010
18:30

Saudi Arabia	2 – 1	United Arab Emirates

Jaber Al-Ahmad International Stadium, Kuwait City

23 September 2010
16:00

Bahrain	0 – 0	Saudi Arabia
	Report

Jaber Al-Ahmad International Stadium, Kuwait City

25 September 2010
16:00

United Arab Emirates	3 – 0	Bahrain
	Report

Jaber Al-Ahmad International Stadium, Kuwait City

=== Group B ===
Team	Pld	W	D	L	GF	GA	GD	Pts
Qatar	2	1	0	1	4	3	+1	3
Oman	2	1	0	1	3	3	0	3
Kuwait	2	1	0	1	3	4	−1	3

All times are local (UTC+3)

21 September 2010
16:00

Kuwait	2 – 1	Oman

Jaber Al-Ahmad International Stadium, Kuwait City

23 September 2010
18:30

Oman	2 – 1	Qatar

Jaber Al-Ahmad International Stadium, Kuwait City

25 September 2010
18:30

Kuwait	1 – 3	Qatar

Jaber Al-Ahmad International Stadium, Kuwait City

== Semifinals ==
27 September 2010
18:30

Saudi Arabia	2 – 1	Oman

Jaber Al-Ahmad International Stadium, Kuwait City

27 September 2010
18:30

Qatar	2 – 2 (2 – 4 pens)	United Arab Emirates

Jaber Al-Ahmad International Stadium, Kuwait City

== Fifth place playoff ==
28 September 2010
17:00

Bahrain	0 − 2	Kuwait

Jaber Al-Ahmad International Stadium, Kuwait City

== Third place playoff ==
29 September 2010
17:00

Oman	2 – 2 (3 – 5 pens)	Qatar

Jaber Al-Ahmad International Stadium, Kuwait City

== Final ==
30 September 2010
18:30

Saudi Arabia	1 – 2	United Arab Emirates

Jaber Al-Ahmad International Stadium, Kuwait City

== Winners ==
GCC U-17 Championship 2010 winners

United Arab Emirates
Third title

== See also ==
- Football at the Southeast Asian Games
- AFC
- AFC Asian Cup
- East Asian Cup
- Arabian Gulf Cup
- South Asian Football Federation Cup
- West Asian Football Federation Championship
