= Rayyan Al-Ali =

Qatari footballer

Personal information
- Full name: Rayyan Ahmed Al-Ali
- Date of birth: 26 March 2006 (age 20)
- Place of birth: Qatar
- Position: Left-back

Team information
- Current team: Al-Gharafa
- Number: 26

Senior career*
Years	Team	Apps	(Gls)
2025–	Al-Gharafa	12	(0)

International career^{‡}
2023	Qatar U16	1	(0)
2026–	Qatar	1	(0)
- * Club domestic league appearances and goals as of 17:06, 1 June 2026 (UTC) ‡ National team caps and goals as of 17:06, 1 June 2026 (UTC)

Rayyan Ahmed Al-Ali (Arabic: ريان احمد العلى; born 26 March 2006) is a Qatari professional footballer who plays as a left-back for Al-Gharafa in the Qatar Stars League and the Qatar national team.

== Club career ==
Al-Ali came through the youth ranks in Qatar before breaking into the Al-Gharafa first team in the 2025–26 season. He made appearances across the Qatar Stars League and the AFC Champions League Elite during his debut senior campaign.

== International career ==
Al-Ali was included in Qatar's preliminary 34-player squad for the 2026 FIFA World Cup, described by The Peninsula Qatar as one of the promising young talents in the selection. However, he did not make it to the final 26-man squad.

== Honours ==
Al-Gharafa

- Amir of Qatar Cup: 2025
