= 2008 GCC U-17 Championship =

Tournament details
- Host country: Saudi Arabia
- Dates: 3–7 August
- Teams: 4 (from UAFA confederations)

Final positions
- Champions: Saudi Arabia (2nd title)
- Runners-up: United Arab Emirates
- Third place: Oman
- Fourth place: Bahrain

The GCC U-17 Championship was played for the fifth time in 2008.

The championship was held in Saudi Arabia.

Only 4 nations participated, Saudi Arabia, UAE, Oman and Bahrain. The nations used it as preparation for the upcoming AFC Youth Championship.

== Participating nations ==
- Bahrain
- Oman
- Saudi Arabia
- (United Arab Emirates) UAE

== Fixtures and results ==
=== Final group ===
Team	Pts	Pld	W	D	L	GF	GA	GD
Saudi Arabia	7	3	2	1	0	5	1	+4
(United Arab Emirates) UAE	6	3	2	0	1	6	3	+3
Oman	4	3	1	1	1	2	2	0
Bahrain	0	3	0	0	3	2	9	−7

3 August 2008

UAE (United Arab Emirates)	2 – 0	Oman

Referee: -

3 August 2008

Saudi Arabia	3 – 1	Bahrain

Referee: -

5 August 2008

Bahrain	1 – 4	(United Arab Emirates) UAE

Referee: -

5 August 2008

Saudi Arabia	0 – 0	Oman

Referee: -

7 August 2008

Bahrain	0 – 2	Oman

Referee: -

7 August 2008

Saudi Arabia	2 – 0	(United Arab Emirates) UAE

Referee: -

== Winners ==
GCC U-17 Championship 2008 winners

Saudi Arabia
Second title

== Awards ==
Top Goalscorers	Most Valuable Player	Best Goalkeeper
(United Arab Emirates) Abdullah Essa	(Saudi Arabia) Abdullah Fareed	(Saudi Arabia) Abdullah Al Sudairy

== See also ==
- Football at the Southeast Asian Games
- AFC
- AFC Asian Cup
- East Asian Cup
- Arabian Gulf Cup
- South Asian Football Federation Cup
- West Asian Football Federation Championship
