= Papua Football Academy =

Indonesian football academy

Papua FA
- Full name: Papua Football Academy
- Nickname: The Boys of Cenderawasih
- Short name: PFA
- Founded: 31 August 2022; 4 years ago
- Ground: Mimika Sports Complex; Mimika Regency, Central Papua
- Owner: Freeport Indonesia
- Coach: Wolfgang Pikal
- League: various youth development leagues
- Website: papuafootballacademy.com

Papua Football Academy (simply known as Papua FA or PFA) is an Indonesian youth football academy and formal school based at the Mimika Sports Complex in Mimika Regency, Central Papua. Founded in 2022, the academy provides full sports scholarships, accommodation, and academic education for young Papuan talents.

== History ==
The establishment of the Papua Football Academy was initiated by Freeport Indonesia, heavily inspired by the enthusiasm and successful hosting of the 20th National Sports Week (PON XX) in the province of Papua in October 2021. The initiative caught the attention of the 7th President of Indonesia, Joko Widodo, who encouraged the formation of a professional football academy to optimize the raw athletic potential of Papuan youths.

The academy aims to systematically produce the next generation of Indonesian national football legends from the region, following the footsteps of notable Papuan players such as Rully Nere, Elie Aiboy, and Boaz Solossa. PFA was officially inaugurated by President Joko Widodo at the Lukas Enembe Stadium in Jayapura Regency, Papua, on 31 August 2022.

== Facilities ==
The academy is headquartered and fully operated within the Mimika Sports Complex in Timika, which was constructed by Freeport Indonesia. The facilities provided for the students include:

- Full-sized tactical training pitches and match fields.
- A modern fitness and sports science center.
- On-site student dormitories managed by professional staff, complete with recreational areas.
- Specialized classrooms, known as the "PFA Headquarters", utilized for formal educational curriculum and vocational training courses.

== Curriculum ==
The coaching methods at the Papua Football Academy are supervised by technical director Wolfgang Pikal alongside local Papuan coaches such as Ardiles Rumbiak. The academy integrates a comprehensive sports science approach that covers technical football analysis, sports psychology, targeted nutrition, physiology, and injury prevention.

The basic framework of the training follows the Filosofi Sepakbola Indonesia (Filanesia), which is the official national football curriculum developed by the Football Association of Indonesia (PSSI). In addition, the academy strictly complies with the FIFA Children Safeguarding Principles to guarantee a safe environment for all youth participants.

== Sponsorship and governance ==
The operational funding and scholarship programs of the Papua Football Academy are fully sponsored by Freeport Indonesia as part of their social investment initiatives in the Papua region. PFA works in close partnership with Indonesia's Ministry of Youth and Sports and the local provincial governments to synchronize sports development with national education standards, allowing the athletes to continue their formal academic progression while pursuing professional football careers.
