= 1990 AFC U-16 Championship =

Tournament details
- Host country: United Arab Emirates
- Dates: 19–29 October
- Teams: 7 (from 1 confederation)

Final positions
- Champions: Qatar (1st title)
- Runners-up: United Arab Emirates
- Third place: China
- Fourth place: Indonesia

Tournament statistics
- Matches played: 13
- Goals scored: 32 (2.46 per match)

The 1990 AFC U-16 Championship, was the fourth iteration of the AFC U-16 Championship, a tournament organised by the Asian Football Confederation (AFC) and held every two years for Asian under-16 teams.

United Arab Emirates was the host nation. The tournament was played out in Dubai, Sharjah, and Abu Dhabi.

== Qualification ==
Qualified teams

- United Arab Emirates (host)
- Jordan (Group 1 winner)
- Qatar (Group 2 winner)
- Saudi Arabia (Group 3 winner)
- India (Group 4 winner)
- South Korea (Group 5 winner)
- China (Group 6 winner)
- Indonesia (Group 7 winner)

== Group stage ==
=== Group A ===
Pos	Team	Pld	W	D	L	GF	GA	GD	Pts	Qualification
1	United Arab Emirates	3	2	1	0	8	1	+7	5	Knockout stage
2	China	3	2	1	0	6	1	+5	5	Knockout stage
3	India	3	1	0	2	2	6	−4	2	–
4	Jordan	3	0	0	3	1	9	−8	0	–

19 October 1990

United Arab Emirates	3–0	India

19 October 1990

China	3–0	Jordan

21 October 1990

China	3–1	India

21 October 1990

United Arab Emirates	5–1	Jordan

23 October 1990

India	1–0	Jordan

23 October 1990

United Arab Emirates	0–0	China

=== Group B ===
Pos	Team	Pld	W	D	L	GF	GA	GD	Pts	Qualification
1	Qatar	2	1	1	0	3	0	+3	3	Knockout stage
2	Indonesia	2	0	2	0	1	1	0	2	Knockout stage
3	South Korea	2	0	1	1	1	4	−3	1	–
–	Saudi Arabia	withdrew								

The then-reigning U-16 world champions Saudi Arabia withdrew, citing Blue Diamond Affair.

20 October 1990

South Korea	1–1	Indonesia

22 October 1990

Qatar	3–0	South Korea

24 October 1990

Qatar	0–0	Indonesia

== Knockout stage ==
=== Semifinals ===
26 October 1990

United Arab Emirates	2–0	Indonesia

26 October 1990

Qatar	1–0	China

=== Third-place match ===
28 October 1990

China	5–0	Indonesia

=== Final ===
29 October 1990

Qatar	2–0	United Arab Emirates

== Winners ==
AFC U-16 Championship 1990 winners

Qatar
First title

== Teams qualified for 1991 FIFA U-17 World Championship ==
- Qatar
- United Arab Emirates
- China

== Sources ==
- rsssf.com
