= 2009 GCC U-17 Championship =

Tournament details
- Host country: UAE
- Dates: 5–14 September
- Teams: 6 (from UAFA confederations)

Final positions
- Champions: United Arab Emirates (2nd title)
- Runners-up: Saudi Arabia
- Third place: Oman
- Fourth place: Bahrain

Tournament statistics
- Matches played: 11
- Goals scored: 30 (2.73 per match)
- Top scorer(s): (Bahrain) Mubarak Salim (Saudi Arabia) Fahad Al Mouallad (United Arab Emirates) Bader mobark (3 goals)
- Best player: (Saudi Arabia) Fahad Al Mouallad

The 2009 GCC U-17 Championship took place in the UAE between 5 and 14 September 2009. Six nations have entered the tournament, two more than the previous tournament held in Saudi Arabia.

Saudi Arabia is the defending champion.

== Groups ==
Group A	Group B
United Arab Emirates (Hosts); Bahrain; Qatar	Oman; Kuwait; Saudi Arabia

== Group Stage Standings & Results ==
=== Group A ===
Team	Pld	W	D	L	GF	GA	GD	Pts
(United Arab Emirates) UAE	2	2	0	0	6	0	+6	6
Bahrain	2	1	0	1	3	6	-3	3
Qatar	2	0	0	2	2	5	-3	0

5 September 2009

UAE (United Arab Emirates)	4 – 0	Bahrain

Referee: -

7 September 2009

Bahrain	3 – 2	Qatar

Referee: -

9 September 2009

Qatar	0 – 2	(United Arab Emirates) UAE

Referee: -

=== Group B ===
Team	Pld	W	D	L	GF	GA	GD	Pts
Saudi Arabia	2	2	0	0	3	1	+2	6
Oman	2	1	0	1	2	2	0	3
Kuwait	2	0	0	2	2	4	-2	0

5 September 2009

Oman	2 – 1	Kuwait

Referee: -

7 September 2009

Saudi Arabia	1 – 0	Oman

Referee: -

9 September 2009

Kuwait	1 – 2	Saudi Arabia

Referee: -

== Semi-finals ==
11 September 2009

Saudi Arabia	3 – 1	Bahrain

Referee: -

7 September 2009

UAE (United Arab Emirates)	3 – 0	Oman

Referee: -

== 5th Place Playoff ==
One off match between 3rd place group stage teams

12 September 2009

Qatar	0 – 1	Kuwait

Referee: -

== 3rd Place Playoff ==
One off match between semi final losers

13 September 2009

Oman	2 – 2 (4 - 3 pens)	Bahrain

Referee: -

== Final ==
14 September 2009

Saudi Arabia	1 – 1 (2 - 4 pens)	(United Arab Emirates) UAE
(69) Fahad Al Moullad		(91) Majed Shshin

Tahnoun Bin Mohamed Stadium
Referee: -

== Winners ==
GCC U-17 Championship 2009 winners

United Arab Emirates
Second title

== Awards ==
Top Goalscorers	Most Valuable Player	Best Goalkeeper
(Bahrain) Mubarak Salim (Saudi Arabia) Fahad AlMouallad (United Arab Emirates) Badr Mubarak	(Saudi Arabia) Fahad AlMouallad	(United Arab Emirates) Nasser Abdulla

== Goalscorers ==
3 goals:

- (Saudi Arabia) Fahad AlMouallad
- (Bahrain) Mubarak Salim
- (United Arab Emirates) Badr Mubarak

2 goals:

- (United Arab Emirates) Yousif Saeed
- (Kuwait) Soud Adailam AlEnazi
- (Oman) Mohammed AlHabsi

1 goals:

- (United Arab Emirates) Majed Shahin
- (United Arab Emirates) Saeed ali
- (United Arab Emirates) salah ali
- (Bahrain) Abdullah Sultan
- (Qatar) Mohamed jamal
- (Oman) Khamis Araimi
- (Oman) Yassin Juma
- (Kuwait) Mohammed AlFahad
- (Saudi Arabia) Abdallah Al-Ammar
- (United Arab Emirates) jawhar Ahmed
- (Saudi Arabia) Faris Al-Ahmadi
- (Saudi Arabia) abdallah AlFahad
- (Bahrain) Abulrahman AL-omairi
- (Saudi Arabia) Fahad Almalki
- (United Arab Emirates) Ahmad ali

== Top scoring teams ==
10 goals

- United Arab Emirates

7 goals

- Saudi Arabia

6 goals

- Bahrain

4 goals

- Oman

3 goals

- Kuwait

2 goals

- Qatar

== See also ==
- Football at the Southeast Asian Games
- AFC
- AFC Asian Cup
- East Asian Cup
- Arabian Gulf Cup
- South Asian Football Federation Cup
- West Asian Football Federation Championship
