= 2011 GCC U-17 Championship =

Tournament details
- Host country: Qatar
- Dates: 5–15 August
- Teams: 6 (from UAFA confederations)

Final positions
- Champions: Saudi Arabia (3rd title)
- Runners-up: Qatar
- Third place: United Arab Emirates
- Fourth place: Oman

Tournament statistics
- Matches played: 11
- Goals scored: 28 (2.55 per match)

The 2011 GCC U-17 Championship took place in Qatar from 5 to 15 August 2011. It was the 8th edition of the tournament.

UAE were the defending champions. Saudi Arabia won the tournament for the third time.

== Groups ==
Group A	Group B
Qatar (Hosts); Kuwait; Saudi Arabia	Oman; United Arab Emirates; Bahrain

== Group stage ==
=== Group A ===
Team	Pld	W	D	L	GF	GA	GD	Pts
Qatar	2	2	0	0	4	1	+3	6
Saudi Arabia	2	1	0	1	3	2	+1	3
Kuwait	2	0	0	2	2	6	-4	0

All times are local (UTC+3)

5 August 2011
21:15

Qatar	1 – 0	Saudi Arabia

Aspire Dome, Doha

7 August 2011
23:30

Kuwait	1 - 3	Saudi Arabia

Aspire Dome, Doha

9 August 2011
23:30

Qatar	3 - 1	Kuwait

Aspire Dome, Doha

=== Group B ===
Team	Pld	W	D	L	GF	GA	GD	Pts
Oman	2	1	1	0	3	0	+3	4
United Arab Emirates	2	1	1	0	2	0	+2	4
Bahrain	2	0	0	2	0	5	−5	0

All times are local (UTC+3)

5 August 2011
23:30

Oman	3 – 0	Bahrain

Aspire Dome, Doha

7 August 2011
21:15

Bahrain	0 – 2	United Arab Emirates

Aspire Dome, Doha

9 August 2011
21:15

United Arab Emirates	0 – 0	Oman

Aspire Dome, Doha

== Semi finals ==
13 August 2011
21:15

Qatar	1 – 1 (4 – 3 pens)	United Arab Emirates

Aspire Dome, Doha

13 August 2011
23:30

Oman	1 – 4	Saudi Arabia

Aspire Dome, Doha

== Fifth place playoff ==
11 August 2011

Bahrain	1 – 0	Kuwait

Aspire Dome, Doha

== Third place playoff ==
15 August 2011

United Arab Emirates	1 – 1 (4 – 2 pens)	Oman

Aspire Dome, Doha

== Final ==
15 August 2011
23:30

Qatar	2 – 2 (3 – 4 pens)	Saudi Arabia

Aspire Dome, Doha

== Winners ==
GCC U-17 Championship 2011 winners

Saudi Arabia
3rd title

== See also ==
- Football at the Southeast Asian Games
- AFC
- AFC Asian Cup
- East Asian Cup
- Arabian Gulf Cup
- South Asian Football Federation Cup
- West Asian Football Federation Championship
