= 1986 AFC U-16 Championship =

Tournament details
- Host country: Qatar
- Dates: 15–24 November
- Teams: 8 (from 1 confederation)
- Venue: (in 1 host city)

Final positions
- Champions: South Korea (1st title)
- Runners-up: Qatar
- Third place: Saudi Arabia
- Fourth place: North Korea

Tournament statistics
- Matches played: 16
- Goals scored: 37 (2.31 per match)

The 1986 AFC U-16 Championship was the 2nd edition of the AFC U-16 Championship organised by the Asian Football Confederation (AFC). It also served as a qualification tournament for the 1987 FIFA U-16 World Championship to be held at Canada. South Korea won the tournament, and qualified for the 1987 U-16 World Cup along runners-up Qatar and third-placed Saudi Arabia.

== Qualification ==
Qualified teams:

- Qatar (host)
- Saudi Arabia (Group 1 winner)
- Bahrain (Group 2 winner)
- Bangladesh (Group 3 winner)
- Burma (Group 4 winner)
- Indonesia (Group 5 winner)
- North Korea (Group 6 winner)
- South Korea (Group 7 winner)

== Group stage ==
=== Group A ===
Team	Pld	W	D	L	GF	GA	GD	Pts
Qatar	3	3	0	0	8	1	+7	6
Saudi Arabia	3	2	0	1	6	2	+4	4
Bangladesh	3	1	0	2	3	8	−5	2
Indonesia	3	0	0	3	2	8	−6	0

November 15

Indonesia	1−5	Saudi Arabia

Doha
November 15

Qatar	6−1	Bangladesh

Doha

November 17

Bangladesh	0−1	Saudi Arabia

Doha
November 17

Qatar	1−0	Indonesia

Doha

November 19

Bangladesh	2−1	Indonesia

Doha
November 19

Saudi Arabia	0−1	Qatar

Doha

=== Group B ===
Team	Pld	W	D	L	GF	GA	GD	Pts
South Korea	3	1	2	0	5	0	+5	4
North Korea	3	0	3	0	4	4	0	3
Burma	3	1	1	1	2	6	−4	3
Bahrain	3	0	2	1	3	4	−1	2

November 16

Bahrain	3−3	North Korea

Doha
November 16

Burma	0−5	South Korea

Doha

November 18

Bahrain	0−0	South Korea

Doha
November 18

Burma	1−1	North Korea

Doha

November 20

Bahrain	0−1	Burma

Doha
November 20

North Korea	0−0	South Korea

Doha

== Knockout stage ==
=== Semifinals ===
November 22

South Korea	1–0	Saudi Arabia

Doha
November 22

Qatar	1–0	North Korea

Doha

=== Third place match ===
November 24

Saudi Arabia	2–0	North Korea

Doha

=== Final ===
November 24

South Korea	0–0	Qatar
Penalties
	5–4

Doha

== Winners ==
AFC U-17 Championship 1986 winners

South Korea
First title

== Teams qualified for 1987 FIFA U-16 World Championship ==
- South Korea
- Qatar
- Saudi Arabia
