= 1988 AFC U-16 Championship =

Tournament details
- Host country: Thailand
- Dates: 1–14 November
- Teams: 10 (from 1 confederation)
- Venue: (in 1 host city)

Final positions
- Champions: Saudi Arabia (2nd title)
- Runners-up: Bahrain
- Third place: China
- Fourth place: Iraq

Tournament statistics
- Matches played: 24
- Goals scored: 67 (2.79 per match)

The 1988 AFC U-16 Championship was the 3rd edition of the AFC U-16 Championship, organised by the Asian Football Confederation (AFC). It was played by Asian under-16 teams and also served as a qualification tournament for the 1989 FIFA U-16 World Championship to be held at Scotland. Saudi Arabia won the tournament by winning 2–0 in the final against Bahrain; both teams qualified to the 1989 FIFA U-16 World Championship, along with third-placed China.

== Qualification ==
Qualified teams:

- Bahrain
- China
- Indonesia
- Iraq
- Japan
- North Korea
- South Korea
- Qatar
- Saudi Arabia
- Thailand (host)

== Group stage ==
=== Group A ===
Pos	Team	Pld	W	D	L	GF	GA	GD	Pts	Qualification
1	Saudi Arabia	4	3	1	0	13	2	+11	7	Knockout Stage
2	Bahrain	4	1	3	0	3	2	+1	5	Knockout Stage
3	South Korea	4	2	0	2	10	9	+1	4	
4	Thailand	4	1	1	2	4	5	−1	3	
5	Indonesia	4	0	1	3	3	15	−12	1	

November 1, 1988

Thailand	1–2	South Korea

Bangkok, Thailand
November 2, 1988

Bahrain	0–0	Saudi Arabia

Bangkok, Thailand

November 3, 1988

Indonesia	0–2	Thailand

Bangkok, Thailand
November 4, 1988

South Korea	0–1	Bahrain

Bangkok, Thailand

November 5, 1988

Saudi Arabia	4–0	Indonesia

Bangkok, Thailand
November 6, 1988

Thailand	0–0	Bahrain

Bangkok, Thailand

November 7, 1988

South Korea	1–6	Saudi Arabia

Bangkok, Thailand
November 8, 1988

Bahrain	2–2	Indonesia

Bangkok, Thailand

November 9, 1988

Saudi Arabia	3–1	Thailand

Bangkok, Thailand
November 10, 1988

Indonesia	1–7	South Korea

Bangkok, Thailand

=== Group B ===
Pos	Team	Pld	W	D	L	GF	GA	GD	Pts	Qualification
1	China	4	2	2	0	6	3	+3	6	Knockout Stage
2	Iraq	4	2	1	1	7	3	+4	5	Knockout Stage
3	Qatar	4	2	1	1	6	3	+3	5	
4	Japan	4	1	1	2	4	8	−4	3	
5	North Korea	4	0	1	3	4	10	−6	1	

November 1, 1988

Qatar	1–0	North Korea

Bangkok, Thailand
November 2, 1988

China	2–0	Japan

Bangkok, Thailand

November 3, 1988

Iraq	2–1	Qatar

Bangkok, Thailand
November 4, 1988

North Korea	2–2	China

Bangkok, Thailand

November 5, 1988

Japan	0–0	Iraq

Bangkok, Thailand
November 6, 1988

Qatar	0–0	China

Bangkok, Thailand

November 7, 1988

North Korea	2–3	Japan

Bangkok, Thailand
November 8, 1988

China	2–1	Iraq

Bangkok, Thailand

November 9, 1988

Japan	1–4	Qatar

Bangkok, Thailand
November 10, 1988

Iraq	4–0	North Korea

Bangkok, Thailand

== Knockout stage ==
=== Semifinals ===
November 12, 1988

China	0–0 (a.e.t.)	Bahrain
Penalties
	3–5

Bangkok, Thailand
November 12, 1988

Saudi Arabia	2–1 (a.e.t.)	Iraq
Jabarti Al-Shamrani 73'; Abdullah Al-Theneyan 98'		Abdullah Al-Theneyan 75' (o.g.)

Bangkok, Thailand

=== Third-place match ===
November 14, 1988

China	1–1 (a.e.t.)	Iraq
Su Maozhen 50'		Khalid Mohamed Karim 19'
Penalties
	4–3

Bangkok, Thailand

=== Final ===
November 14, 1988

Saudi Arabia	2–0	Bahrain
Khalid Al-Rowaihi 33', 39'

Bangkok, Thailand

== Winners ==
AFC U-17 Championship 1988 winners

Saudi Arabia
Second title

== Teams qualified for 1989 FIFA U-16 World Championship ==
- Saudi Arabia
- Bahrain
- China

== Sources ==
- rsssf.com
