= 1985 AFC U-16 Championship =

Tournament details
- Host country: Qatar
- Dates: 1–10 February
- Teams: 7
- Venue: (in 1 host city)

Final positions
- Champions: Saudi Arabia (1st title)
- Runners-up: Qatar
- Third place: Iraq
- Fourth place: Thailand

Tournament statistics
- Matches played: 12
- Goals scored: 21 (1.75 per match)

The 1985 AFC U-16 Championship was the inaugural edition of the AFC U-16 Championship organized by the Asian Football Confederation (AFC), a tournament for Asian under-16 teams that also served as a qualification tournament for the 1985 FIFA U-16 World Championship to be held at China. The tournament was won by Saudi Arabia, who defeated Qatar on penalties. Both teams accompanied the already qualified China to the 1985 FIFA U-16 World Cup.

== Group stage ==
=== Group A ===
Pos	Team	Pld	W	D	L	GF	GA	GD	Pts	Qualification
1	Qatar (H)	1	1	0	0	3	1	+2	2	Knockout stage
2	Saudi Arabia	2	1	0	1	4	3	+1	2	Knockout stage
3	Japan	1	0	0	1	0	3	−3	0	
4	Kuwait	0	0	0	0	0	0	0	0	Withdrew

(H) Hosts
February 1, 1985

Qatar	3−1	Saudi Arabia

Doha
February 5, 1985

Saudi Arabia	3−0	Japan

Doha
- Qatar vs. Japan was originally scheduled for February 3, but wasn't played.

=== Group B ===
Pos	Team	Pld	W	D	L	GF	GA	GD	Pts	Qualification
1	Thailand	3	1	2	0	3	2	+1	4	Knockout stage
2	Iraq	3	2	0	1	2	1	+1	4	Knockout stage
3	South Yemen	3	0	2	1	4	5	−1	2	
4	China	3	0	2	1	2	3	−1	2	

February 2, 1985

Iraq	1−0	China
Abdul-Nabi

Doha
February 2, 1985

Thailand	2−2	South Yemen

Doha

February 4, 1985

Iraq	1−0	South Yemen
Farhood

Doha
February 4, 1985

Thailand	0−0	China

Doha

February 6, 1985

Thailand	1−0	Iraq

Doha
February 6, 1985

China	2−2	South Yemen

Doha

== Knockout stage ==
Semi-finals
February 8 – Doha
Qatar	1
Iraq	0
February 8 – Doha
Saudi Arabia	1
Thailand	0

Final
February 10 – Doha
Saudi Arabia (p)	0 (4)
Qatar	0 (3)
Third place
February 10 – Doha
Iraq	1
Thailand	0

=== Semifinals ===
February 8, 1985

Qatar	1−0	Iraq

Doha
February 8, 1985

Saudi Arabia	1−0	Thailand

Doha

=== Third-place match ===
February 10, 1985

Iraq	1−0	Thailand
Saddam

Doha

=== Final ===
February 10, 1985

Saudi Arabia	0−0 (a.e.t.)	Qatar
Penalties
	4–3

Doha

== Winners ==
AFC U-16 Championship 1985 winners

Saudi Arabia
First title

== Teams qualified for 1985 FIFA U-16 World Championship ==
- China (as host of the 1985 FIFA U-16 World Championship)
- Saudi Arabia
- Qatar
