= 1996 AFC U-16 Championship =

Tournament details
- Host country: Thailand
- Dates: 17 September – 1 October
- Teams: 10 (from 1 confederation)

Final positions
- Champions: Oman (1st title)
- Runners-up: Thailand
- Third place: Bahrain
- Fourth place: Japan

Tournament statistics
- Matches played: 24
- Goals scored: 86 (3.58 per match)

The 1996 AFC U-16 Championship was the 7th edition of the tournament, organized by the Asian Football Confederation (AFC) every two years. Thailand was the host nation.

== Venue ==
All matches were played in Chiang Mai, Thailand.

Chiang Mai
700th Anniversary Stadium
Capacity: 25,000
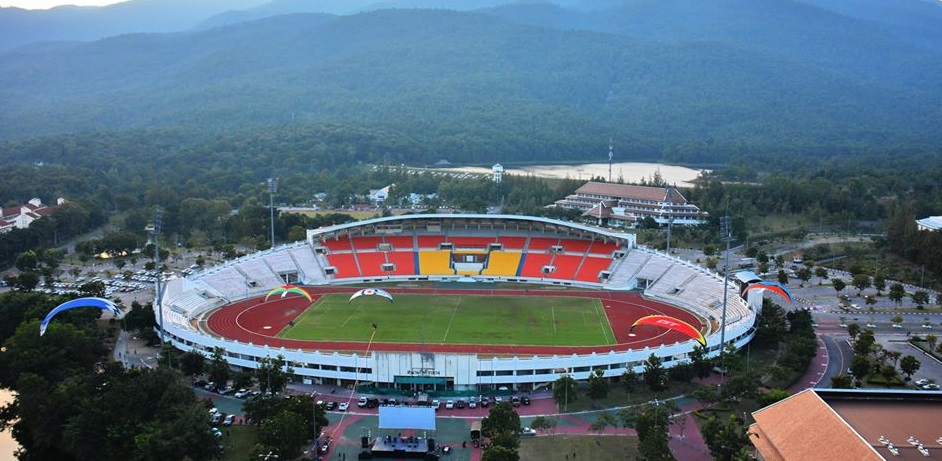

== Qualification ==
Qualified Teams:

- Bahrain
- China
- India
- Iran
- Japan
- South Korea
- Kuwait
- Oman
- Uzbekistan
- Thailand (host)

== Group stage ==
=== Group A ===
Pos	Team	Pld	W	D	L	GF	GA	GD	Pts	Qualification
1	Oman	4	3	1	0	12	4	+8	10	Knockout stage
2	Japan	4	3	1	0	13	6	+7	10	Knockout stage
3	South Korea	4	1	1	2	7	8	−1	4	
4	Kuwait	4	1	0	3	5	9	−4	3	
5	Uzbekistan	4	0	1	3	2	12	−10	1	

18 September 1996

Japan	2–2	Oman

18 September 1996

Kuwait	1–3	South Korea

20 September 1996

Japan	3–2	South Korea

20 September 1996

Uzbekistan	1–6	Oman

22 September 1996

Oman	3–1	South Korea

22 September 1996

Uzbekistan	0–2	Kuwait

24 September 1996

Japan	5–2	Kuwait

24 September 1996

Uzbekistan	1–1	South Korea

26 September 1996

Oman	1–0	Kuwait

26 September 1996

Uzbekistan	0–3	Japan

=== Group B ===
Pos	Team	Pld	W	D	L	GF	GA	GD	Pts	Qualification
1	Thailand	4	3	1	0	15	3	+12	10	Knockout Stage
2	Bahrain	4	3	0	1	13	7	+6	9	Knockout Stage
3	China	4	1	1	2	5	10	−5	4	
4	Iran	4	1	0	3	5	8	−3	3	
5	India	4	1	0	3	6	16	−10	3	

17 September 1996

China	2–0	Iran

17 September 1996

Thailand	7–0	India

19 September 1996

Bahrain	3–2	India

19 September 1996

Thailand	3–0	Iran

21 September 1996

Bahrain	6–0	China

21 September 1996

India	1–4	Iran

23 September 1996

Bahrain	2–4	Thailand

23 September 1996

India	3–2	China

25 September 1996

Bahrain	2–1	Iran

25 September 1996

Thailand	1–1	China

== Knock-out stage ==
=== Semifinals ===
29 September 1996

Oman	1–0	Bahrain

29 September 1996

Thailand	1–0	Japan

=== Third place match ===
1 October 1996

Bahrain	0–0 (a.e.t.)	Japan
Penalties
	4–1

=== Final ===
1 October 1996

Oman	1–0	Thailand

== Winners ==
AFC U-16 Championship 1996 winners

Oman
First title

== Teams qualified for 1997 FIFA U-17 World Championship ==
- Oman
- Thailand
- Bahrain

== Sources ==
- rsssf.com
