= Qatar national under-17 football team =

Qatar Under-17
- Association: Qatar Football Association
- Confederation: AFC (Asia)
- Sub-confederation: WAFF (West Asia)
- Head coach: Álvaro Mejía
- Home stadium: Khalifa International Stadium; Jassim bin Hamad Stadium
- FIFA code: QAT
First colours	Second colours

FIFA U-17 World Cup
- Appearances: 12 (first in 1991)
- Best result: Fourth place (1991)

AFC U-17 Asian Cup
- Appearances: 12 (first in 1985)
- Best result: (gold) Champions (1990)

The Qatar national under-17 football team is the national U-17 team of Qatar and is controlled by the Qatar Football Association.

== History ==
Despite being a country with a small base of footballers; Qatar has had a respectable degree of achievements at the youth level. In addition to becoming champions of Asia in 1990 after winning the 1990 AFC U-16 Championship held in the UAE, they also finished runners up five times (1985, 1986, 1992, 1994, and 1998). In addition, Qatar have also been the hosts of four of the U-16 championships; a record.

The youth players became consistent finalists in the Asian U-16 championships since they first reached the final in 1986 when they lost to South Korea in a dramatic penalty shoot-out on home soil, which was tightly clinched 5–4. This was followed by another appearance in 1988 before winning it 1990 after defeating China by a scoreline of 2–0.

One year later, they managed an Asian record high fourth-place finish in the FIFA U-17 World Cup, even with a relatively slow start as they failed to gain more than a single point in the first two group B matches, however, a Jassim Al Tammimi goal against Australia was enough for a quarterfinal place.

Qatar advanced to the semis on the expense of the United States, whom they defeated 5–4 in a penalty shoot-out after the score had settled 1–1 at the end of regulation time. Shortly after, they themselves went down in a penalty shootout to eventual champions, Ghana, in the semi-finals, before suffering the same fate against Argentina in the third-place match respectively.

Qatar's tradition of youth teams' excellence was to be prolonged for another decade; they reached the World Cup three more times on 1993, 1995 and 2005.

In the 2005 FIFA U-17 World Cup, Qatar were drawn 2–2 with the mighty Netherlands before half-time in their first group match. Although Qatar went on to lose the match 5–3, many future talents were discovered during the tournament, including Khalfan Ibrahim who went on to win the Asian Player of the Year award one year later.

They hosted the FIFA U-17 World Cup twenty years after their last appearance which took place in 2025 but went out in the group stage.

== Competitive record ==
=== FIFA U-17 World Cup ===
Year	Result	Pld	W	D	L	GF	GA
(China) 1985	Group stage	3	0	0	3	2	8
(Canada) 1987	Group stage	4	2	1	1	4	5
(Scotland) 1989	Did not qualify						
(Italy) 1991	Fourth place	6	1	4	1	3	3
(Japan) 1993	Group stage	3	1	0	2	3	7
(Ecuador) 1995	Group stage	3	0	1	2	1	5
(Egypt) 1997	Did not qualify						
(New Zealand) 1999	Quarter-finals	4	2	0	2	6	4
(Trinidad and Tobago) 2001	Did not qualify						
(Finland) 2003	Did not qualify						
(Peru) 2005	Group stage	3	0	0	3	4	14
(South Korea) 2007	Did not qualify						
(Nigeria) 2009	Did not qualify						
(Mexico) 2011	Did not qualify						
(United Arab Emirates) 2013	Did not qualify						
(Chile) 2015	Did not qualify						
(India) 2017	Did not qualify						
(Brazil) 2019	Did not qualify						
(Indonesia) 2023	Did not qualify						
(Qatar) 2025	Group stage	3	0	2	1	1	2
(Qatar) 2026	In progress	1	1	0	0	2	0
(Qatar) 2027	Qualified as hosts						
(Qatar) 2028	Qualified as hosts						
(Qatar) 2029	Qualified as hosts						
Total:12/24	Fourth place	30	7	8	15	26	48

=== AFC U-17 Asian Cup ===
Year	Result	GP	W	D	L	GF	GA
(Qatar) 1985	Runners-up	3	2	1	0	4	1
(Qatar) 1986	Runners-up	5	4	1	0	9	1
(Thailand) 1988	Group stage	4	2	1	1	6	3
(United Arab Emirates) 1990	Champions	4	3	1	0	6	0
(Saudi Arabia) 1992	Runners-up	5	3	1	1	9	6
(Qatar) 1994	Runners-up	6	4	0	2	11	5
(Thailand) 1996	Did not qualify						
(Qatar) 1998	Runners-up	6	4	2	0	12	5
(Vietnam) 2000	Did not qualify						
(United Arab Emirates) 2002	Quarter-finals	4	1	0	3	4	6
(Japan) 2004	Third place	6	4	2	0	15	7
(Singapore) 2006	Did not qualify						
(Uzbekistan) 2008	Did not qualify						
(Uzbekistan) 2010	Did not qualify						
(Iran) 2012	Did not qualify						
(Thailand) 2014	Group stage	3	0	2	1	4	5
(India) 2016	Did not qualify						
(Malaysia) 2018	Did not qualify						
(Thailand) 2023	Group stage	3	0	1	2	2	8
(Saudi Arabia) 2025	Did not qualify						
(Saudi Arabia) 2026	Group stage	3	1	0	2	3	5
(Uzbekistan) 2027	To be determined						
(Saudi Arabia) 2028	To be determined						
(Saudi Arabia) 2029	To be determined						
Total	12/24	52	28	12	12	85	52

== Head-to-head record ==
The following table shows Qatar's head-to-head record in the FIFA U-17 World Cup and AFC U-17 Asian Cup.

=== In FIFA U-17 World Cup ===
Opponent	Pld	W	D	L	GF	GA	GD	Win %
Argentina	1	0	1	0	1	1	+0	0.00
Australia	3	1	0	2	1	4	−3	33.33
Bolivia	1	0	1	0	0	0	+0	0.00
Brazil	2	0	0	2	1	8	−7	0.00
Burkina Faso	1	1	0	0	2	1	+1	100.00
Canada	1	1	0	0	2	1	+1	100.00
Colombia	1	1	0	0	2	0	+2	100.00
Congo	1	0	1	0	0	0	+0	0.00
Czech Republic	1	0	0	1	0	2	−2	0.00
Egypt	1	1	0	0	1	0	+1	100.00
Gambia	1	0	0	1	1	3	−2	0.00
Ghana	1	0	1	0	0	0	+0	0.00
Greece	0	0	0	0	0	0	+0	—
Hungary	1	0	0	1	0	3	−3	0.00
Italy	2	0	1	1	1	2	−1	0.00
Ivory Coast	1	0	0	1	0	3	−3	0.00
Jamaica	1	1	0	0	4	0	+4	100.00
Mexico	2	0	0	2	1	4	−3	0.00
Netherlands	1	0	0	1	3	5	−2	0.00
Nigeria	1	0	1	0	1	1	+0	0.00
Panama	1	1	0	0	2	0	+2	100.00
Paraguay	1	0	0	1	0	2	−2	0.00
South Africa	1	0	1	0	1	1	+0	0.00
Spain	1	0	0	1	0	1	−1	0.00
United States	2	0	1	1	2	6	−4	0.00
Total	30	7	8	15	26	48	−22	23.33

=== In AFC U-17 Asian Cup ===
Opponent	Pld	W	D	L	GF	GA	GD	Win %
Afghanistan	1	0	0	1	1	2	−1	0.00
Bahrain	1	1	0	0	2	1	+1	100.00
Bangladesh	2	2	0	0	12	2	+10	100.00
China	7	2	2	3	6	9	−3	28.57
Indonesia	3	2	1	0	3	0	+3	66.67
Iran	4	2	1	1	8	4	+4	50.00
Iraq	4	3	0	1	4	2	+2	75.00
Japan	4	2	0	2	8	6	+2	50.00
Kuwait	1	1	0	0	4	3	+1	100.00
North Korea	5	4	1	0	7	3	+4	80.00
Oman	1	1	0	0	1	0	+1	100.00
Saudi Arabia	5	2	2	1	5	3	+2	40.00
South Korea	4	2	1	1	6	7	−1	50.00
Syria	2	0	1	1	1	2	−1	0.00
Thailand	3	1	2	0	5	3	+2	33.332
United Arab Emirates	2	2	0	0	4	1	+3	100.00
Uzbekistan	3	1	1	1	8	4	+4	33.33
Total	52	28	12	12	85	52	+33	53.85

== Current squad ==
The following players were called up for the 2023 AFC U-17 Asian Cup between 15 June and 2 July 2023.

No.	Pos.	Player	Date of birth (age)	Club
1	GK	Anas Erraji	16 November 2006 (age 20)	(Qatar Football Association) Al-Gharafa
21	GK	Zeiad Mohamed Shoaib	6 February 2006 (age 20)	(Qatar Football Association) Al-Gharafa
22	GK	Galal Amir El-Sharkawy	26 February 2006 (age 20)	(Qatar Football Association) Al-Duhail
2	DF	Abdolaziz Abbas Jafari	14 January 2006 (age 20)	(Qatar Football Association) Al-Duhail
3	DF	Ahmad Samir Al-Mughanni	27 April 2006 (age 20)	(Qatar Football Association) Al-Sadd
4	DF	Yousef Ziyad Marei	2 February 2007 (age 19)	(Qatar Football Association) Al-Ahli
5	DF	Ali Mohammad Shahabi	29 January 2006 (age 20)	(Qatar Football Association) Al-Ahli
12	DF	Yazan Emad Awwad	29 September 2006 (age 20)	(Qatar Football Association) Al-Sadd
16	DF	Abdurrahman Iwan Kuswanto	14 August 2006 (age 20)	(Qatar Football Association) Al-Wakrah
23	DF	Abdulla Salman Al-Otaibi	15 April 2006 (age 20)	(Qatar Football Association) Al-Sadd
6	MF	Salem Reda	30 July 2006 (age 20)	(Qatar Football Association) Al-Arabi
8	MF	Mohammed Aman Al-Sulaiti	6 July 2006 (age 20)	(Qatar Football Association) Al-Arabi
10	MF	Bassam Adel Eid	25 September 2006 (age 20)	(Qatar Football Association) Al-Sadd
15	MF	Khalid Atiyaq Al-Shaaibi	3 June 2007 (age 19)	(Qatar Football Association) Al-Sadd
18	MF	Awab Mirghani Fadil	5 April 2006 (age 20)	(Qatar Football Association) Al-Duhail
20	MF	Esmail Musaed Al-Ahrak	5 February 2006 (age 20)	(Qatar Football Association) Al-Gharafa
7	FW	Tahsin Mohammed Jamshid	16 June 2006 (age 20)	(Qatar Football Association) Al-Duhail
9	FW	Dekhayel Tariq Al-Hamad	22 February 2006 (age 20)	(Qatar Football Association) Al-Duhail
11	FW	Rayyan Ahmed Al-Ali	26 March 2006 (age 20)	(Qatar Football Association) Al-Gharafa
13	FW	Mohamed Muatasim Elsiddig	18 May 2007 (age 19)	(Qatar Football Association) Al-Duhail
14	FW	Aws Adel Al-Muhiarat	30 November 2006 (age 19)	(Qatar Football Association) Al-Sadd
17	FW	Nasser Adil Babiker	26 August 2006 (age 20)	(Qatar Football Association) Al-Ahli
19	FW	Ethan Socorro	1 February 2007 (age 19)	(Qatar Football Association) Al-Rayyan

== Current coaching staff ==
Last update: February 2014.

Technical staff
Head coach	(Spain) Álvaro Mejía
Assistant coach	(Spain) Jorge Peris
Goalkeeping coach	(Qatar) Husam Abu Shanab
Fitness coach	(Qatar) Rami Al-Salati
Chief analyst	(England) Benjamin Goodson
Administrative staff
Director of administration	(Qatar) Mohammed Al Obaidly
Administrator	(Qatar) Faraj Saleh Al Marri
Media co-ordinator	(Qatar) Abdullah Saleh Sulaiti

== Managerial history ==
- (Brazil) Ronald de Carvalho (1979–85)
- (Qatar) Saeed al-Misnad (1985)
- (Brazil) Cabralzinho (1985)
- (Brazil) José Roberto Avila (ca. 1991)
- (Brazil) Humberto Filho (1993)
- (Netherlands) Wiel Coerver (ca. 1993)
- (Sweden) Bo Augustsson (ca. 1990s)
- (Netherlands) René Meulensteen (ca. 1990s)
- (Scotland) Dave Mackay (1995)
- (Qatar) Eid Mubarak (1995–96)
- (Qatar) Ahmed Omar (1996)
- (Denmark) Ove Pedersen (1996–97)
- (Brazil) José Paulo (1998–99)
- (Qatar) Saeed al-Misnad (1999)
- (Brazil) José Paulo (1999–c. 00)
- (Netherlands) Chris Dekker (2000–01)
- (Netherlands) Ruud Dokter (2001–02)
- (France) Patrick Revelli (2002–04)
- (Belgium) Tom Saintfiet (2004)
- (Netherlands) Tini Ruijs (2004–05)
- (Qatar) Fahad Thani (2005–06)
- (Netherlands) Tini Ruijs (2010–12)
- (Spain) Félix Sánchez Bas (2012–13)
- (Spain) Óscar Fernández (2012–15)
- (Netherlands) Arno Buitenweg (2013–17)
- (Qatar) Ibrahim Shafie (2021–24)
- (Algeria) Ahmed Reda Madouni (2024–25)
- (Spain) Álvaro Mejía (2025–)

== See also ==
- Qatar national football team
- Qatar national under-20 football team
- Qatar national under-23 football team
