= 2023 AFC U-17 Asian Cup squads =

The following is a list of squads for each national team competing at the 2023 AFC U-17 Asian Cup. The tournament took place in Thailand, between 15 June and 2 July 2023. It was the 19th U-17 age group competition organised by the Asian Football Confederation.

Players born between 1 January 2006 and 31 December 2008 were eligible to compete in the tournament. Each team had to register a squad of minimum 18 players and maximum 23 players, minimum three of whom must have been goalkeepers (Regulations Articles 26.3 and 26.3.4). The full squad listings are below.

The age listed for each player is as of 15 June 2023, the first day of the tournament. Players in bold have been capped at full international level.

== Group A ==
=== Thailand ===
Thailand announced their final squad on 2 June.

Manager: Pipob On-Mo

No.	Pos.	Player	Date of birth (age)	Club
1	GK	Tissanu Khuptanawin	10 February 2006 (aged 17)	(Football Association of Thailand) Chonburi
2	DF	Chanasorn Choklap	31 January 2006 (aged 17)	(Football Association of Thailand) Assumption College Thonburi
3	DF	Surachai Booncharee	26 April 2007 (aged 16)	(Football Association of Thailand) Bangkok United
4	DF	Jeerapong Chamsakul	12 May 2006 (aged 17)	(Football Association of Thailand) Chonburi
5	DF	Kittiphat Boonduang	10 February 2007 (aged 16)	(Football Association of Thailand) Muangthong United
6	MF	Pacharaphol Lekkun (captain)	4 June 2006 (aged 17)	(Football Association of Thailand) Chonburi
7	MF	Nanthiphat Chaiman	28 July 2006 (aged 16)	(Football Association of Thailand) Assumption College Sriracha
8	MF	Phanthawat Khetchompoo	3 April 2006 (aged 17)	(Football Association of Thailand) Buriram United
9	FW	Thanadol Hembuphakari	16 July 2006 (aged 16)	(Football Association of Thailand) Bangkok United
10	FW	Chanothai Kongmeng	7 March 2006 (aged 17)	(Football Association of Thailand) Buriram United
11	FW	Jirapong Pungviravong	20 September 2006 (aged 16)	(Football Association of Thailand) Buriram United
12	DF	Siraphob Nilsaeng	8 November 2006 (aged 16)	(Football Association of Thailand) BG Pathum United
13	DF	Saranyawat Naprasert	3 April 2006 (aged 17)	(Football Association of Thailand) BG Pathum United
14	MF	Ratthathammanun Deeying	10 December 2006 (aged 16)	(Football Association of Thailand) Chonburi
15	FW	Phongsakorn Sangkasopha	19 October 2006 (aged 16)	(Football Association of Thailand) Hua Hin City
16	DF	Tanakrit Lomnak	14 August 2006 (aged 16)	(Football Association of Thailand) Chonburi
17	FW	Teerapat Pruetong	17 February 2007 (aged 16)	(Football Association of Thailand) PTT Rayong
18	MF	Natee Tampradab	20 August 2006 (aged 16)	(Football Association of Thailand) Police Tero
19	MF	Dutsadee Buranajutanon	7 March 2006 (aged 17)	(Football Association of Thailand) Buriram United
20	GK	Supanut Sudathip	22 June 2006 (aged 16)	(Football Association of Thailand) Bangkok United
21	MF	Pichaiya Kongsri	3 August 2007 (aged 15)	(Football Association of Thailand) Bangkok United
22	FW	Kongnat Thuamthongdee	25 January 2007 (aged 16)	(Football Association of Thailand) Bangkok Sport School
23	GK	Thanakit Auttharak	17 March 2006 (aged 17)	(Football Association of Thailand) Nongbua Pitchaya

=== Yemen ===
Yemen announced their final squad on 13 May.

Manager: Mohammed Al-Baadani

No.	Pos.	Player	Date of birth (age)	Club
1	GK	Wadhah Al-Radfani	24 January 2008 (aged 15)	(Yemen Football Association) Al-Tilal
2	DF	Mohammed Raed	19 December 2007 (aged 15)	(Yemen Football Association) Shamsan
3	DF	Anwar Al-Turaiqi	1 January 2006 (aged 17)	(Yemen Football Association) Al-Shaab Sanaa
4	DF	Hesham Al-Husaini	6 March 2007 (aged 16)	(Yemen Football Association) Al-Yarmuk
5	DF	Mohammed Al-Hendi	17 January 2007 (aged 16)	(Yemen Football Association) Seiyun
6	DF	Ahmed Esmail	16 May 2007 (aged 16)	(Yemen Football Association) Shamsan
7	FW	Mohammed Fadhel	11 August 2007 (aged 15)	(Yemen Football Association) Al-Wehda Aden
8	MF	Haitham Al-Salami	1 January 2006 (aged 17)	(Yemen Football Association) Al-Shaab Sanaa
9	FW	Zaid Al-Garash	5 November 2008 (aged 14)	(Yemen Football Association) Al-Ittihad
10	MF	Essam Radman (captain)	27 July 2006 (aged 16)	(Yemen Football Association) Al-Shaab Sanaa
11	FW	Abdulrahman Al-Khadher	5 November 2008 (aged 14)	(Yemen Football Association) Al-Wehda Aden
12	MF	Ghassan Baradah	25 June 2007 (aged 15)	(Yemen Football Association) Al-Saqr
13	DF	Ahmed Al-Hajj	29 September 2007 (aged 15)	(Yemen Football Association) Al-Shula
14	MF	Ahmed Al-Mushiki	7 July 2008 (aged 14)	(Yemen Football Association) Al-Yarmuk
15	DF	Abdullah Al-Aqel	10 December 2007 (aged 15)	
16	MF	Mohammed Moqbel	12 February 2006 (aged 17)	(Yemen Football Association) Shamsan
17	DF	Ali Al-Hanbasi	25 May 2006 (aged 17)	(Yemen Football Association) Al-Wehda Sanaa
18	FW	**Adel Qasem**	1 March 2008 (aged 15)	(Yemen Football Association) Al-Tilal
19	DF	Yunes Ali	5 November 2008 (aged 14)	(Yemen Football Association) Al-Ahli
20	FW	Aiham Daghaif	2 November 2006 (aged 16)	(Yemen Football Association) Al-Ahli
21	DF	Abdulwahid Al-Sayaghi	5 November 2006 (aged 16)	(Yemen Football Association) Al-Ahli
22	GK	Mabrook Taleb	21 November 2006 (aged 16)	
23	GK	Marwan Meyad	7 November 2007 (aged 15)	(Yemen Football Association) Al-Wehda Sanaa

=== Malaysia ===
Malaysia announced their final squad on 12 June.

Manager: Osmera Omaro

No.	Pos.	Player	Date of birth (age)	Club
1	GK	Farish Farhan	30 January 2006 (aged 17)	(Football Association of Malaysia) Academy Mokhtar Dahari
2	DF	Aiman Yusuf	6 March 2006 (aged 17)	(Football Association of Malaysia) Academy Mokhtar Dahari
3	DF	Faris Danish	4 July 2006 (aged 16)	(Football Association of Malaysia) Academy Mokhtar Dahari
4	DF	Adib Ibrahim	16 August 2006 (aged 16)	(Football Association of Malaysia) Johor Darul Ta'zim
5	DF	Ryan Fahreen	18 April 2007 (aged 16)	(Football Association of Malaysia) Academy Mokhtar Dahari
6	MF	Afiq Hasniruddin (captain)	29 April 2006 (aged 17)	(Football Association of Malaysia) Academy Mokhtar Dahari
7	FW	Arami Wafiy	30 March 2006 (aged 17)	(Football Association of Malaysia) Academy Mokhtar Dahari
8	MF	Afiq Zulkifli	14 March 2006 (aged 17)	(Football Association of Malaysia) Academy Mokhtar Dahari
9	FW	Dainei Mat Disa	22 March 2006 (aged 17)	(Football Association of Malaysia) Academy Mokhtar Dahari
10	MF	Irfan Zakwan	21 June 2006 (aged 16)	(Football Association of Malaysia) Academy Mokhtar Dahari
11	FW	Ezawi Azman	25 May 2006 (aged 17)	(Football Association of Malaysia) Johor Darul Ta'zim
12	FW	Anjasmirza Saharudin	5 February 2006 (aged 17)	(Football Association of Malaysia) Academy Mokhtar Dahari
13	DF	Raja Norfirdaus	28 January 2006 (aged 17)	(Football Association of Malaysia) Academy Mokhtar Dahari
14	MF	Don Damien	1 October 2006 (aged 16)	(Football Association of Malaysia) Academy Mokhtar Dahari
15	DF	Irfan Aswad	8 July 2007 (aged 15)	(Football Association of Malaysia) Academy Mokhtar Dahari
16	GK	Aliff Aiman	21 February 2006 (aged 17)	(Football Association of Malaysia) Academy Mokhtar Dahari
17	FW	Zainurhakimi Zain	11 April 2006 (aged 17)	(Football Association of Malaysia) Academy Mokhtar Dahari
18	MF	Afiq Hakimi	4 January 2007 (aged 16)	(Football Association of Malaysia) Academy Mokhtar Dahari
19	FW	Nabil Fitri	12 October 2006 (aged 16)	(Football Association of Malaysia) Academy Mokhtar Dahari
20	MF	Aisy Al-Hakim	13 January 2007 (aged 16)	(Football Association of Malaysia) Academy Mokhtar Dahari
21	DF	Ahmad Danial	18 March 2006 (aged 17)	(Football Association of Malaysia) Academy Mokhtar Dahari
22	DF	Mulia Hairi	11 January 2006 (aged 17)	(Football Association of Malaysia) Academy Mokhtar Dahari
23	GK	Syazrul Haziq	6 March 2006 (aged 17)	(Football Association of Malaysia) Academy Mokhtar Dahari

=== Laos ===
Laos announced their final squad on 12 June.

Manager: Phonethip Sengmany

No.	Pos.	Player	Date of birth (age)	Club
1	GK	Chanthavisouk Nouvorlavong	9 January 2007 (aged 16)	(Lao Football Federation) Savannakhet Province
2	DF	Xayyasouk Keovisone	21 July 2006 (aged 16)	(Lao Football Federation) Ezra
3	DF	Chanthavisouk Phongsavath	16 December 2007 (aged 15)	(Lao Football Federation) Champasak United
4	DF	**Khammanh Thapaseuth**	31 December 2007 (aged 15)	(Lao Football Federation) Savannakhet Province
5	DF	Sisavath Keomoungkhoun	5 October 2006 (aged 16)	(Lao Football Federation) Namtha United
6	MF	Ketsada Detkhoumman	30 May 2007 (aged 16)	(Lao Football Federation) Lao Army
7	MF	Khounthavy Thongmany	16 October 2006 (aged 16)	(Lao Football Federation) Chanthabouly
8	MF	**Sayfon Keohanam** (captain)	11 July 2006 (aged 16)	(Football Association of Thailand) Nonthaburi United S.Boonmeerit
9	FW	Thanousack Nanthavongdouangsy	21 August 2006 (aged 16)	(Lao Football Federation) Vientiane FT
10	FW	**Peter Phanthavong**	15 February 2006 (aged 17)	(Lao Football Federation) Ezra
11	MF	Sayyavath Vansavath	28 June 2008 (aged 14)	(Lao Football Federation) Champasak United
12	GK	Soulisak Manpaseuth	1 November 2008 (aged 14)	(Lao Football Federation) Champasak United
13	DF	Aliyakone Phongsavanh	2 February 2006 (aged 17)	(Lao Football Federation) Vientiane FT
14	DF	Doulanay Keomanivong	24 June 2007 (aged 15)	(Lao Football Federation) Chanthabouly
15	DF	Khounvang Soundala	13 November 2006 (aged 16)	(Lao Football Federation) Namtha United
16	MF	Khamsing Nalinthone	25 January 2006 (aged 17)	(Lao Football Federation) Young Elephants
17	MF	Kadam Koneyer	10 October 2008 (aged 14)	(Lao Football Federation) Sekong
18	GK	Souksamone Vethita	13 August 2007 (aged 15)	(Lao Football Federation) Young Elephants
19	MF	**Phousomboun Panyavong**	20 June 2007 (aged 15)	(Lao Football Federation) Lao Army
20	FW	Sikanda Xaysongkham	3 July 2008 (aged 14)	(Lao Football Federation) Champasak Province
21	MF	Billy Donsanouphit	30 June 2008 (aged 14)	(Lao Football Federation) Ezra
22	FW	Phetsamone Sihathep	30 March 2006 (aged 17)	(Lao Football Federation) Young Elephants
23	MF	Soulin Thammasone	24 March 2006 (aged 17)	(Lao Football Federation) Namtha United

Phonethip Sengmany is the first Asian woman to coach a men's national team of any level.

== Group B ==
=== South Korea ===
South Korea announced their final squad on 15 June.

Manager: Byun Sung-hwan

No.	Pos.	Player	Date of birth (age)	Caps	Goals	Club
1	GK	Joo Seung-min	13 June 2006 (aged 17)	1	0	(Korea Football Association) Jeju United
2	DF	Lee Soo-ro	18 January 2006 (aged 17)	1	0	(Korea Football Association) Jeonbuk Hyundai Motors
3	DF	Lee Chang-woo	12 March 2006 (aged 17)	5	0	(Korea Football Association) Seoul Bo-in High School
4	DF	Kang Min-woo	2 March 2006 (aged 17)	6	1	(Korea Football Association) Ulsan Hyundai
5	DF	Yoo Min-jun	21 March 2006 (aged 17)	2	0	(Korea Football Association) Seongnam FC
6	MF	Cha Jae-hoon	3 May 2006 (aged 17)	2	0	(Korea Football Association) Seoul Jungkyung High School
7	MF	Yun Do-young	28 October 2006 (aged 16)	5	2	(Korea Football Association) Daejeon Hana Citizen
8	MF	Baek In-woo	29 November 2006 (aged 16)	6	0	(Korea Football Association) Yongin Football Center
9	FW	Kim Myung-jun (captain)	21 March 2006 (aged 17)	5	1	(Korea Football Association) Pohang Steelers
10	MF	Jin Tae-ho	20 January 2006 (aged 17)	4	0	(Korea Football Association) Jeonbuk Hyundai Motors
11	MF	**Yang Min-hyuk**	16 April 2006 (aged 17)	6	0	(Korea Football Association) Gangwon FC
12	DF	Hwang Ji-sung	20 June 2006 (aged 16)	2	1	(Korea Football Association) Incheon United
13	DF	Kim Yu-geon	28 March 2006 (aged 17)	1	0	(Korea Football Association) FC Seoul
14	FW	Kim Hyun-min	30 July 2006 (aged 16)	4	0	(Korea Football Association) Yeongdeungpo Technical High School
15	DF	Seo Jeong-hyeok	9 March 2006 (aged 17)	4	0	(Korea Football Association) Jeonbuk Hyundai Motors
16	MF	Lim Hyun-sub	16 January 2006 (aged 17)	5	0	(Korea Football Association) Suwon Samsung Bluewings
17	FW	Park Seung-soo	17 March 2007 (aged 16)	0	0	(Korea Football Association) Suwon Samsung Bluewings
18	FW	Lee Jae-hwan	15 December 2006 (aged 16)	1	2	(Korea Football Association) Incheon United
19	MF	Kim Seong-ju	2 August 2006 (aged 16)	3	1	(Korea Football Association) Suwon Samsung Bluewings
20	DF	Ko Jong-hyun	11 April 2006 (aged 17)	5	1	(Korea Football Association) Suwon Samsung Bluewings
21	GK	Yoon Jae-hoon	1 April 2006 (aged 17)	0	0	(Korea Football Association) Ulsan Hyundai
22	MF	Park Hyun-min	2 April 2007 (aged 16)	1	0	(Korea Football Association) Jeonbuk Hyundai Motors
23	GK	Hong Seong-min	29 September 2006 (aged 16)	3	0	(Korea Football Association) Pohang Steelers

=== Iran ===
Iran announced their final squad on 5 June.

Manager: Hossein Abdi

No.	Pos.	Player	Date of birth (age)	Club
1	GK	Arsha Shakouri	1 October 2006 (aged 16)	(Football Federation Islamic Republic of Iran) Esteghlal
2	DF	Nima Andarz	22 January 2006 (aged 17)	(Football Federation Islamic Republic of Iran) KIA Football Academy
3	DF	Hesam Nafari	7 May 2006 (aged 17)	(Football Federation Islamic Republic of Iran) Zob Ahan
4	DF	Alireza Homaeifard	14 January 2006 (aged 17)	(Football Federation Islamic Republic of Iran) Paykan
5	DF	Erfan Darvishaali (captain)	22 March 2006 (aged 17)	(Football Federation Islamic Republic of Iran) Foolad
6	MF	Samir Hoboobati	4 February 2006 (aged 17)	(Football Federation Islamic Republic of Iran) KIA Football Academy
7	MF	Esmaeil Gholizadeh	18 February 2006 (aged 17)	(Football Federation Islamic Republic of Iran) Sepahan
8	MF	**Amirmohammad Razzaghinia**	11 April 2006 (aged 17)	(Football Federation Islamic Republic of Iran) KIA Football Academy
9	DF	Yaghoub Barage	26 January 2006 (aged 17)	(Football Federation Islamic Republic of Iran) Mes Kerman
10	FW	**Kasra Taheri**	6 August 2006 (aged 16)	(Football Federation Islamic Republic of Iran) Sepahan
11	FW	Alireza Sharifi	20 March 2006 (aged 17)	(Football Federation Islamic Republic of Iran) KIA Football Academy
12	GK	Mohammad Hossein Sharifi	10 June 2006 (aged 17)	(Football Federation Islamic Republic of Iran) Esteghlal
13	MF	Mehdi Jenadeleh	11 May 2006 (aged 17)	(Football Federation Islamic Republic of Iran) Foolad
14	MF	Zargham Saadavi	31 March 2006 (aged 17)	(Football Federation Islamic Republic of Iran) Foolad
15	MF	Mohammad Askari	7 February 2006 (aged 17)	(Football Federation Islamic Republic of Iran) Foolad
16	FW	Farjad Fayaz	9 April 2006 (aged 17)	(Football Federation Islamic Republic of Iran) Malavan
17	FW	Reza Ghandipour	13 January 2006 (aged 17)	(Football Federation Islamic Republic of Iran) Paykan
18	MF	Mahan Sadeghi	23 June 2006 (aged 16)	(Football Federation Islamic Republic of Iran) Malavan
19	MF	Abolfazl Zamani	1 March 2006 (aged 17)	(Football Federation Islamic Republic of Iran) Paykan
20	DF	Hamidreza Shamsipour	28 May 2006 (aged 17)	(Football Federation Islamic Republic of Iran) Malavan
21	DF	Abolfazl Moredi	7 February 2006 (aged 17)	(Football Federation Islamic Republic of Iran) Foolad
22	GK	Farzad Rahimi	19 April 2006 (aged 17)	(Football Federation Islamic Republic of Iran) Sepahan
23	DF	Abolfazl Zoleykhaei	9 March 2006 (aged 17)	(Football Federation Islamic Republic of Iran) Parsian

=== Afghanistan ===
Afghanistan announced their final squad on 15 June.

Manager: Yusuf Mahandiszadah

No.	Pos.	Player	Date of birth (age)	Club
1	GK	Mansoor Noorzai	6 March 2006 (aged 17)	
2	DF	Rohullah Nazari	13 December 2006 (aged 16)	
3	DF	Ehsan Ahmad Rahmani	15 January 2007 (aged 16)	
4	DF	Omid Sarwari	3 October 2006 (aged 16)	
5	DF	Ahmad Sawad Sultani	13 March 2006 (aged 17)	
6	MF	**Ali Rahimi** (captain)	20 February 2006 (aged 17)	(Afghanistan Football Federation) Sorkh Poshan Herat
7	FW	Roman Hamidi	22 November 2006 (aged 16)	
8	MF	Jawad Al-Okoazay	22 January 2006 (aged 17)	(Afghanistan Football Federation) Attack Energy
9	MF	Arash Ahmadi	11 February 2008 (aged 15)	
10	MF	**Hakim Niazi**	14 August 2006 (aged 16)	(Afghanistan Football Federation) Attack Energy
11	FW	Navid Mohammadi	12 March 2006 (aged 17)	
12	FW	Enayatullah Kohi	1 March 2006 (aged 17)	
13	DF	Rahmatullah Jafari	31 December 2007 (aged 15)	
14	FW	Ali Ramazani	14 March 2006 (aged 17)	
15	DF	Arash Habibi	31 May 2006 (aged 17)	
16	MF	Ahmad Shekib Mehri	2 December 2006 (aged 16)	
18	MF	Mohammad Zarif Amini	30 December 2008 (aged 14)	
18	DF	Farid Gawhari	25 November 2006 (aged 16)	
19	FW	**Habibullah Hotak**	31 May 2007 (aged 16)	(Afghanistan Football Federation) Sorkh Poshan Herat
20	MF	Farzad Tajik	14 February 2007 (aged 16)	(Afghanistan Football Federation) Sorkh Poshan Herat
21	MF	Mohammad Mostafa Mohammadi	23 June 2006 (aged 16)	
22	GK	Shabir Ahmad Khairkhwa	31 January 2007 (aged 16)	
23	GK	Sediqullah Hussain Khail	7 May 2006 (aged 17)	

=== Qatar ===
Qatar announced their final squad on 13 June.

Manager: Óscar Fernández

No.	Pos.	Player	Date of birth (age)	Club
1	GK	Anas Erraji	16 November 2006 (aged 16)	(Qatar Football Association) Al-Gharafa
2	DF	Abdulaziz Al-Jaafari	14 January 2006 (aged 17)	(Qatar Football Association) Al-Duhail
3	DF	Ahmad Al-Mughanni	27 April 2006 (aged 17)	(Qatar Football Association) Al-Sadd
4	DF	**Yousef Marei**	2 February 2007 (aged 16)	(Qatar Football Association) Al-Ahli
5	DF	Ali Shahabi	29 January 2006 (aged 17)	(Qatar Football Association) Al-Ahli
6	MF	Salem Reda	30 July 2006 (aged 16)	(Qatar Football Association) Al-Arabi
8	MF	Mohammed Al-Sulaiti	6 July 2006 (aged 16)	(Qatar Football Association) Al-Arabi
7	FW	**Tahsin Jamshid**	16 June 2006 (aged 16)	(Qatar Football Association) Al-Duhail
9	FW	Dekhayel Al-Hamad	22 February 2006 (aged 17)	(Qatar Football Association) Al-Duhail
10	MF	Bassam Eid (captain)	25 September 2006 (aged 16)	(Qatar Football Association) Al-Sadd
11	FW	Rayyan Al-Ali	26 March 2006 (aged 17)	(Qatar Football Association) Al-Gharafa
12	DF	Yazan Awad	29 September 2006 (aged 16)	(Qatar Football Association) Al-Sadd
13	FW	Mohamed El-Siddig	18 May 2007 (aged 16)	(Qatar Football Association) Al-Duhail
14	FW	Awas Al-Muhiarat	30 November 2006 (aged 16)	(Qatar Football Association) Al-Sadd
15	MF	Khalid Al-Shaaibi	3 June 2007 (aged 16)	(Qatar Football Association) Al-Sadd
16	DF	Iwan Kuswanto	14 August 2006 (aged 16)	(Qatar Football Association) Al-Wakrah
17	FW	Nasser Babiker	26 August 2006 (aged 16)	(Qatar Football Association) Al-Ahli
18	MF	Awab Fadil	5 April 2006 (aged 17)	(Qatar Football Association) Al-Duhail
19	FW	Ethan Socorro	1 February 2007 (aged 16)	(Qatar Football Association) Al-Rayyan
20	MF	Ismail Al-Ahrak	5 February 2006 (aged 17)	(Qatar Football Association) Al-Gharafa
21	GK	Ziyad Shoaib	6 February 2006 (aged 17)	(Qatar Football Association) Al-Gharafa
22	GK	Galal El-Sharkawy	26 February 2006 (aged 17)	(Qatar Football Association) Al-Duhail
23	DF	Abdullah Al-Otaibi	15 April 2006 (aged 17)	(Qatar Football Association) Al-Sadd

== Group C ==
=== Tajikistan ===
Tajikistan announced their final squad on 13 June.

Manager: Zaynidin Rakhimov

No.	Pos.	Player	Date of birth (age)	Caps	Goals	Club
1	GK	Abubakir Makhmudov	8 December 2006 (aged 16)	0	0	(Tajikistan Football Federation) Istiklol
2	MF	Bakhtovar Gayurov	3 January 2006 (aged 17)	0	0	(Tajikistan Football Federation) Barqchi Hisor
3	DF	Khodzi Abdumanon	9 January 2006 (aged 17)	4	1	(Tajikistan Football Federation) Isfara
4	DF	Dilovar Dzhamshedzoda	2 December 2006 (aged 16)	4	1	(Tajikistan Football Federation) Barqchi Hisor
5	DF	**Nigmatullozoda Barakatullo**	17 August 2006 (aged 16)	2	0	(Tajikistan Football Federation) Barqchi Hisor
6	MF	Sheravgan Saidov	5 February 2006 (aged 17)	4	0	(Tajikistan Football Federation) Barqchi Hisor
7	FW	Masrur Gafurov	21 January 2006 (aged 17)	4	1	(Tajikistan Football Federation) Barqchi Hisor
8	MF	**Dzhovidon Khushvakhtov**	25 August 2006 (aged 16)	4	0	(Tajikistan Football Federation) Barqchi Hisor
9	FW	**Bilol Boboev**	30 June 2006 (aged 16)	3	0	(Tajikistan Football Federation) Barqchi Hisor
10	MF	**Abubakr Sulaimonov** (captain)	18 September 2006 (aged 16)	4	1	(Tajikistan Football Federation) Barqchi Hisor
11	MF	Akhmadzhon Abdusattor		0	0	(Tajikistan Football Federation) Barqchi Hisor
12	FW	Shakhbon Naimov	9 August 2007 (aged 15)	4	0	(Tajikistan Football Federation) Barqchi Hisor
13	FW	Rabboni Kamolov	27 June 2006 (aged 16)	4	4	(Tajikistan Football Federation) Barqchi Hisor
14	DF	Mekhrubon Khamidov	24 April 2006 (aged 17)	3	0	(Tajikistan Football Federation) Barqchi Hisor
15	DF	Farkhod Amiri	12 September 2006 (aged 16)	4	0	(Tajikistan Football Federation) Barqchi Hisor
16	GK	Mukhammad Abdulkhadov	29 June 2006 (aged 16)	0	0	(Tajikistan Football Federation) Panjshir Balch
17	MF	Sherzod Kakhorov	20 July 2006 (aged 16)	0	0	(Tajikistan Football Federation) Barqchi Hisor
18	FW	Nuriddin Oriyonmekhr	16 February 2006 (aged 17)	2	1	(Tajikistan Football Federation) Istiklol
19	FW	Tokhiri Mukhammadzhon	15 September 2006 (aged 16)	1	0	(Tajikistan Football Federation) Istiklol
20	MF	Yunus Ismatulloev	25 September 2006 (aged 16)	0	0	(Tajikistan Football Federation) Barqchi Hisor
21	FW	Rustam Kamolov	4 June 2007 (aged 16)	3	0	(Tajikistan Football Federation) Istiklol
22	MF	Khabibdzhon Khamitov	15 December 2006 (aged 16)	0	0	(Tajikistan Football Federation) Barqchi Hisor
23	GK	Sunatullo Ismoilov	24 May 2006 (aged 17)	4	0	(Tajikistan Football Federation) Barqchi Hisor

=== Australia ===
Australia announced their final squad on 13 June.

Manager: Brad Maloney

No.	Pos.	Player	Date of birth (age)	Caps	Goals	Club
1	GK	Anthony Pavlesic (captain)	31 January 2006 (aged 17)	6	0	(Football Australia) Central Coast Mariners
2	DF	Peter Antoniou	29 January 2007 (aged 16)	9	2	(Football Australia) Melbourne City
3	DF	Aden Green	27 August 2006 (aged 16)	2	1	(Football Australia) Western Sydney Wanderers
4	DF	Sotiris Phillis	11 August 2006 (aged 16)	6	0	(Football Australia) Adelaide United
5	DF	Bailey O'Neill	2 February 2006 (aged 17)	0	0	(Football Australia) Adelaide United
6	DF	Andriano Lebib	29 January 2006 (aged 17)	8	2	(Football Australia) Perth Glory
7	FW	Daniel Bennie	13 April 2006 (aged 17)	3	0	(Football Australia) Perth Glory
8	MF	Corey Sutherland	28 May 2006 (aged 17)	4	0	(Football Australia) Perth Glory
9	FW	Mitchell Glasson	4 May 2006 (aged 17)	6	6	(Football Australia) Sydney FC
10	MF	Miguel Di Pizio	4 January 2006 (aged 17)	6	5	(Football Australia) Central Coast Mariners
11	MF	Tiago Quintal	16 June 2006 (aged 16)	5	4	(Football Australia) Sydney FC
12	GK	Daniel Graskoski	28 January 2007 (aged 16)	0	0	(Football Australia) Northcote City
13	DF	Zac De Jesus	4 February 2006 (aged 17)	7	0	(Football Australia) Sydney FC
14	MF	Giovanni De Abreu	16 April 2006 (aged 17)	0	0	(Football Australia) Perth Glory
15	DF	Nathan Barrie	29 May 2006 (aged 17)	0	0	(Football Australia) Western Sydney Wanderers
16	MF	Edward Ince	8 October 2006 (aged 16)	0	0	(Football Australia) Brisbane Roar
17	FW	**Nestory Irankunda**	9 February 2006 (aged 17)	3	8	(Football Australia) Adelaide United
18	GK	Michael Vonja	12 January 2006 (aged 17)	1	0	(Football Australia) Western United
19	DF	Richard Nkomo	6 February 2007 (aged 16)	0	0	(Football Australia) Sydney FC
20	FW	Campbell Dovison	5 January 2006 (aged 17)	6	2	(Football Australia) Central Coast Mariners
21	DF	Fabian Talladira	4 February 2006 (aged 17)	6	0	(Football Australia) Adelaide United
22	FW	Nathan Amanatidis	23 January 2006 (aged 17)	0	0	(Football Australia) Adelaide United
23	FW	Jordan Hoey	6 January 2006 (aged 17)	3	1	(Football Australia) Melbourne Victory

=== Saudi Arabia ===
Saudi Arabia announced their final squad on 15 June.

Manager: Abdelwahab Al-Harbi

No.	Pos.	Player	Date of birth (age)	Club
1	GK	Mahmoud Al-Burayh	14 February 2006 (aged 17)	(Saudi Arabian Football Federation) Al-Fateh
2	DF	Mohammed Muhaysh	2 March 2006 (aged 17)	(Saudi Arabian Football Federation) Al-Hilal
3	DF	Muhannad Al-Harthi	10 July 2006 (aged 16)	(Saudi Arabian Football Federation) Al-Ettifaq
4	DF	Riyad Al-Yami	13 April 2006 (aged 17)	(Saudi Arabian Football Federation) Al-Ahli
5	DF	Yaseen Al-Jaber	30 April 2006 (aged 17)	(Saudi Arabian Football Federation) Al-Ittihad
6	DF	Mohammed Hazazi	8 April 2006 (aged 17)	(Saudi Arabian Football Federation) Al-Nassr
7	MF	Jathob Al-Dhefiri	9 September 2007 (aged 15)	(Saudi Arabian Football Federation) Al-Batin
8	MF	Farhah Al-Shamrani (captain)	27 February 2006 (aged 17)	(Saudi Arabian Football Federation) Al-Ittihad
9	FW	**Talal Haji**	16 September 2007 (aged 15)	(Saudi Arabian Football Federation) Al-Ittihad
10	FW	Nawaf Al-Jaadani	4 January 2006 (aged 17)	(Saudi Arabian Football Federation) Al-Ittihad
11	MF	Faris Salem	25 August 2007 (aged 15)	(Saudi Arabian Football Federation) Al-Nassr
12	MF	Qasem Begheel	22 August 2006 (aged 16)	(Saudi Arabian Football Federation) Ohod
13	MF	Mohammed Al-Muwallad	1 February 2006 (aged 17)	(Saudi Arabian Football Federation) Al-Ittihad
14	MF	Nawaf Al-Janahi	7 October 2006 (aged 16)	(Saudi Arabian Football Federation) Al-Ettifaq
15	MF	Bader Al-Bishi	1 May 2007 (aged 16)	(Saudi Arabian Football Federation) Al-Hilal
16	MF	Saad Al-Mutairi	6 December 2006 (aged 16)	(Saudi Arabian Football Federation) Al-Hilal
17	MF	Ammar Al-Yahebi	3 March 2006 (aged 17)	(Saudi Arabian Football Federation) Al-Ahli
18	MF	Ramez Al-Attar	17 January 2006 (aged 17)	(Saudi Arabian Football Federation) Al-Ahli
19	MF	Yousef Al-Tahhan	10 January 2006 (aged 17)	(Saudi Arabian Football Federation) Al-Nassr
20	FW	Nawaf Al-Bishri	2 March 2006 (aged 17)	(Saudi Arabian Football Federation) Al-Hazem
21	GK	Abdulrahman Al-Ghamdi	13 February 2006 (aged 17)	(Saudi Arabian Football Federation) Al-Taawoun
22	GK	Mohammed Al-Jaafari	28 April 2006 (aged 17)	(Saudi Arabian Football Federation) Al-Watan
23	DF	Abdulsalam Barnawi	8 February 2007 (aged 16)	(Saudi Arabian Football Federation) Al-Hilal

=== China PR ===
China announced their final squad on 3 June.

Manager: Yang Chen

No.	Pos.	Player	Date of birth (age)	Club
1	GK	Yao Haoyang	28 October 2006 (aged 16)	(Chinese Football Association) Hubei Istar
2	DF	Sun Kangbo	19 August 2006 (aged 16)	(Chinese Football Association) Hubei Istar
3	DF	Wu Qipeng	28 February 2007 (aged 16)	(Chinese Football Association) Shanghai Shenhua
4	DF	Xuan Dongxu	25 March 2006 (aged 17)	(Chinese Football Association) Shanghai Shenhua
5	DF	Yang Mingrui	5 April 2007 (aged 16)	(Chinese Football Association) Dalian Pro
6	MF	Qian Yuanfan	11 April 2006 (aged 17)	(Chinese Football Association) Zhejiang
7	MF	Cui Taixu	2 June 2006 (aged 17)	(Chinese Football Association) Zhejiang
8	MF	Huang Kaijun	23 May 2006 (aged 17)	(Chinese Football Association) Hubei Istar
9	FW	**Liu Chengyu**	2 July 2006 (aged 16)	(Chinese Football Association) Shanghai Shenhua
10	FW	**Wang Yudong**	23 November 2006 (aged 16)	(Chinese Football Association) Zhejiang
11	FW	Wang Haobin	11 August 2006 (aged 16)	(Chinese Football Association) Shandong Taishan
12	GK	Xie Jintian	28 March 2006 (aged 17)	(Chinese Football Association) Beijing Guoan
13	DF	Yang Bowen	5 February 2006 (aged 17)	(Chinese Football Association) Hubei Istar
14	FW	Mei Shuaijun	8 February 2006 (aged 17)	(Chinese Football Association) Shandong Taishan
15	FW	Zhang Junjie	15 October 2006 (aged 16)	(Chinese Football Association) Shanghai Port
16	DF	Liu Tiecheng	22 April 2006 (aged 17)	(Chinese Football Association) Shanghai Port
17	FW	He Kanghua	6 October 2006 (aged 16)	(Chinese Football Association) Shandong Taishan
18	FW	Huang Zheng	28 April 2006 (aged 17)	(Chinese Football Association) Shanghai Shenhua
19	MF	**Kuai Jiwen**	28 February 2006 (aged 17)	(Chinese Football Association) Shanghai Port
20	MF	Ouyang Jiaxin	2 January 2007 (aged 16)	(Chinese Football Association) Genbao Football Base
21	FW	Yu Zhuowei	15 August 2006 (aged 16)	(Chinese Football Association) Dalian Pro
22	GK	Xie Gongbo (captain)	22 May 2006 (aged 17)	(Chinese Football Association) Nantong Haimen Codion
23	MF	Li Ming	23 May 2006 (aged 17)	(Chinese Football Association) Shanghai Port

== Group D ==
=== Japan ===
Japan announced their final squad on 2 June.

Manager: Yoshiro Moriyama

No.	Pos.	Player	Date of birth (age)	Club
1	GK	Wataru Goto	8 May 2006 (aged 17)	(Japan Football Association) FC Tokyo
2	DF	Haruto Matsumoto	29 September 2006 (aged 16)	(Japan Football Association) Kashima Antlers
3	DF	Keita Kosugi (captain)	18 March 2006 (aged 17)	(Japan Football Association) Shonan Bellmare
4	DF	Kaito Tsuchiya	12 May 2006 (aged 17)	(Japan Football Association) Kawasaki Frontale
5	DF	Shuto Nagano	15 April 2006 (aged 17)	(Japan Football Association) FC Tokyo
6	MF	Ryunosuke Yada	30 September 2006 (aged 16)	(Japan Football Association) Shimizu S-Pulse
7	MF	Shungo Sugiura	14 May 2006 (aged 17)	(Japan Football Association) Nagoya Grampus
8	MF	Kohei Mochizuki	7 June 2006 (aged 17)	(Japan Football Association) Yokohama F. Marinos
9	FW	Yutaka Michiwaki	5 April 2006 (aged 17)	(Japan Football Association) Roasso Kumamoto
10	MF	Ryunosuke Sato	16 October 2006 (aged 16)	(Japan Football Association) FC Tokyo
11	FW	Rento Takaoka	12 March 2007 (aged 16)	(Japan Football Association) Nissho Gakuen High School
12	GK	Taisei Kambayashi	21 February 2006 (aged 17)	(Japan Football Association) Montedio Yamagata
13	DF	Yumeki Yoshinaga	22 February 2006 (aged 17)	(Japan Football Association) Kamimura Gakuen High School
14	FW	Gaku Nawata	29 July 2006 (aged 16)	(Japan Football Association) Kamimura Gakuen High School
15	MF	Joi Yamamoto	18 May 2006 (aged 17)	(Japan Football Association) Tokyo Verdy
16	DF	Kotaro Honda	20 May 2006 (aged 17)	(Japan Football Association) Shonan Bellmare
17	DF	Shotaro Shibata	17 April 2006 (aged 17)	(Japan Football Association) Kawasaki Frontale
18	MF	Yotaro Nakajima	22 April 2006 (aged 17)	(Japan Football Association) Sanfrecce Hiroshima
19	MF	Daiki Miyagawa	24 March 2006 (aged 17)	(Japan Football Association) Gamba Osaka
20	MF	Gakuto Kawamura	6 April 2006 (aged 17)	(Japan Football Association) Tokyo Verdy
21	MF	Gota Yamaguchi	24 April 2007 (aged 16)	(Japan Football Association) Shohei High School
22	DF	Yuya Kuroki	4 December 2007 (aged 15)	(Japan Football Association) Sagan Tosu
23	GK	Rui Araki	14 October 2007 (aged 15)	(Japan Football Association) Gamba Osaka

=== India ===
India announced their final squad on 30 May.

Manager: Bibiano Fernandes

No.	Pos.	Player	Date of birth (age)	Caps	Goals	Club
1	GK	Sahil Poonia	6 March 2006 (aged 17)	13	0	(All India Football Federation) Zinc Football
2	DF	Ricky Meetei	30 August 2006 (aged 16)	14	2	(All India Football Federation) Eastern Sporting Union
3	DF	Surajkumar Singh	28 June 2006 (aged 16)	4	0	(All India Football Federation) SAI Guwahati
4	DF	Mukul Panwar	7 July 2007 (aged 15)	12	1	(All India Football Federation) Chandigarh FA
5	MF	Prachit Gaonkar	13 May 2006 (aged 17)	1	0	(All India Football Federation) Goa
6	MF	Gurnaj Singh	9 January 2007 (aged 16)	14	0	(All India Football Federation) Chandigarh FA
7	FW	Korou Singh (captain)	3 December 2006 (aged 16)	14	5	(All India Football Federation) Sudeva Delhi
8	MF	Akash Tirkey	19 September 2006 (aged 16)	12	1	(All India Football Federation) Minerva Academy
9	FW	Thanglalsoun Gangte	22 April 2006 (aged 17)	14	9	(All India Football Federation) Sudeva Delhi
10	MF	Vanlalpeka Guite	23 October 2006 (aged 16)	14	5	(All India Football Federation) Aizawl
11	MF	Lalpekhlua Lalnuntluanga	30 April 2007 (aged 16)	14	4	(All India Football Federation) Bengaluru
12	DF	Malemngamba Singh	18 September 2006 (aged 16)	14	1	(All India Football Federation) SAI SAG
13	GK	Julfikar Gazi	6 May 2006 (aged 17)	1	0	(All India Football Federation) Bengal FA
14	FW	Gogocha Chungkham	27 January 2006 (aged 17)	0	0	(All India Football Federation) Classic FA
15	FW	Lemmet Tangvah	27 January 2007 (aged 16)	0	0	(All India Football Federation) Chandigarh FA
16	FW	Omang Dodum	24 June 2006 (aged 16)	0	0	(All India Football Federation) RoundGlass Punjab
17	MF	Danny Meitei	20 November 2007 (aged 15)	6	0	(All India Football Federation) Sudeva Delhi
18	FW	Shashwat Panwar	28 May 2006 (aged 17)	4	3	(All India Football Federation) Chandigarh FA
19	FW	Faizan Waheed	21 September 2006 (aged 16)	1	0	(All India Football Federation) J&K FA
20	DF	Dhanajit Ashangbam	17 January 2006 (aged 17)	0	0	(All India Football Federation) Manipur FA
21	GK	Pranav Sundarraman	21 January 2007 (aged 16)	0	0	(All India Football Federation) Meghalaya FA
22	DF	Pramveer Singh	12 July 2006 (aged 16)	0	0	(All India Football Federation) Punjab FA
23	MF	Rohen Singh	22 April 2007 (aged 16)	0	0	(All India Football Federation) East Bengal

=== Vietnam ===
Vietnam announced their final squad on 12 June.

Manager: Hoàng Anh Tuấn

No.	Pos.	Player	Date of birth (age)	Club
1	GK	Phạm Đình Hải	29 March 2006 (aged 17)	(Vietnam Football Federation) Hà Nội
2	DF	Phan Văn Thành	27 June 2006 (aged 16)	(Vietnam Football Federation) Sông Lam Nghệ An
3	DF	Nguyễn Lương Tuấn Khải	14 November 2006 (aged 16)	(Vietnam Football Federation) Huế
4	DF	Lê Nguyễn Quốc Trung	16 May 2006 (aged 17)	(Vietnam Football Federation) PVF
5	DF	Đặng Thanh Bình	29 June 2006 (aged 16)	(Vietnam Football Federation) Viettel
6	MF	Phạm Nguyễn Quốc Trung	6 May 2006 (aged 17)	(Vietnam Football Federation) Sông Lam Nghệ An
7	DF	Vi Đình Thượng	8 February 2006 (aged 17)	(Vietnam Football Federation) Huế
8	FW	Lê Đình Long Vũ	27 May 2006 (aged 17)	(Vietnam Football Federation) Sông Lam Nghệ An
9	MF	Nguyễn Công Phương (captain)	3 June 2006 (aged 17)	(Vietnam Football Federation) Viettel
10	FW	Nguyễn Thiên Phú	25 January 2008 (aged 15)	(Vietnam Football Federation) Hà Nội
11	FW	Phùng Quang Tú	13 March 2007 (aged 16)	(Vietnam Football Federation) PVF
12	DF	Nguyễn Quốc Khánh	15 May 2007 (aged 16)	(Vietnam Football Federation) PVF
13	GK	Nguyễn Bảo Ngọc	28 March 2007 (aged 16)	(Vietnam Football Federation) Sông Lam Nghệ An
14	FW	Lê Huỳnh Triệu	16 June 2006 (aged 16)	(Vietnam Football Federation) Đồng Tháp
15	DF	Bùi Văn Hoàng	31 January 2007 (aged 16)	(Vietnam Football Federation) Nam Định
16	DF	Nguyễn Hoàng Nam	7 October 2007 (aged 15)	(Vietnam Football Federation) Viettel
17	DF	Lê Nguyễn Quốc Kiên	16 May 2006 (aged 17)	(Vietnam Football Federation) PVF
18	DF	Nguyễn Hữu Trọng	24 November 2006 (aged 16)	(Vietnam Football Federation) Hồ Chí Minh City
19	FW	Nguyễn Lê Phát	12 January 2007 (aged 16)	(Vietnam Football Federation) PVF
20	DF	Đinh Quang Kiệt	16 July 2007 (aged 15)	(Vietnam Football Federation) Hoàng Anh Gia Lai
21	FW	Phùng Văn Nam	22 January 2006 (aged 17)	(Vietnam Football Federation) Sông Lam Nghệ An
22	FW	Hoàng Công Hậu	28 June 2007 (aged 15)	(Vietnam Football Federation) Viettel
23	GK	Nguyễn Quang Huy	19 June 2006 (aged 16)	(Vietnam Football Federation) SHB Đà Nẵng

=== Uzbekistan ===
Uzbekistan announced their final squad on 4 June.

Manager: Jamoliddin Rakhmatullayev

No.	Pos.	Player	Date of birth (age)	Club
1	GK	Diyor Tulaboev	4 March 2006 (aged 17)	(Uzbekistan Football Association) Pakhtakor Tashkent
2	DF	Aminbek Yokubov	27 December 2006 (aged 16)	(Uzbekistan Football Association) Lokomotiv Tashkent
3	DF	Bobur Karimov	13 March 2006 (aged 17)	(Uzbekistan Football Association) Pakhtakor Tashkent
4	DF	Asror Otakhonov	22 January 2006 (aged 17)	(Uzbekistan Football Association) Metallurg Bekabad
5	DF	Azizbek Tulkunbekov	10 February 2007 (aged 16)	(Uzbekistan Football Association) Bunyodkor
6	DF	Ozod Uktamov	10 July 2006 (aged 16)	(Uzbekistan Football Association) Navbahor Namangan
7	MF	Lazizbek Mirzaev (captain)	5 October 2006 (aged 16)	(Uzbekistan Football Association) Lokomotiv Tashkent
8	FW	Bekhruz Shukurullaev	27 October 2006 (aged 16)	(Uzbekistan Football Association) Olympic Tashkent
9	FW	Amir Saidov	1 February 2006 (aged 17)	(Uzbekistan Football Association) Bunyodkor
10	FW	Abdulkhamid Turgunboev	16 June 2006 (aged 16)	(Uzbekistan Football Association) Andijon
11	FW	Kuvonch Abraev	20 January 2007 (aged 16)	(Uzbekistan Football Association) Lokomotiv Tashkent
12	GK	Asilbek Numonov	12 August 2006 (aged 16)	(Uzbekistan Football Association) Nasaf
13	DF	Bekhruz Jumatov	13 February 2006 (aged 17)	(Uzbekistan Football Association) Olympic Tashkent
14	FW	Shodiyor Shodiboev	29 March 2006 (aged 17)	(Uzbekistan Football Association) Navbahor Namangan
15	MF	Abdulkhamid Ikromov	21 July 2006 (aged 16)	(Uzbekistan Football Association) Navbahor Namangan
16	MF	Mukhammedali Reimov	26 June 2006 (aged 16)	(Uzbekistan Football Association) TFA Tashkent
17	MF	Ollabergan Karimov	17 June 2006 (aged 16)	(Uzbekistan Football Association) Bunyodkor
18	FW	Nikolas Akopov	18 August 2006 (aged 16)	(Uzbekistan Football Association) Lokomotiv Tashkent
19	DF	Sherzod Abdulboriev	20 June 2006 (aged 16)	(Uzbekistan Football Association) Navbahor Namangan
20	MF	Oybek Urmonjonov	9 October 2006 (aged 16)	(Uzbekistan Football Association) Olympic Tashkent
21	GK	Yusuf Sobirov	20 April 2006 (aged 17)	(Uzbekistan Football Association) Bunyodkor
22	DF	Mamadalikhon Olimov	16 May 2006 (aged 17)	(Uzbekistan Football Association) Navbahor Namangan
23	DF	Dilshod Abdullaev	9 May 2006 (aged 17)	(Uzbekistan Football Association) Pakhtakor Tashkent
