= 2023 AFC U-17 Asian Cup qualification =

Tournament details
- Host countries: Jordan (Group A); Indonesia (Group B); Oman (Group C); Saudi Arabia (Group D); Bangladesh (Group E); Vietnam (Group F); Australia (Group G); Tajikistan (Group H); Kyrgyzstan (Group I); Uzbekistan (Group J)
- Dates: 1–9 October 2022
- Teams: 44 (from 1 confederation)

Tournament statistics
- Matches played: 70
- Goals scored: 344 (4.91 per match)
- Top scorer(s): (Australia) Nestory Irankunda (China) Wang Yudong (8 goals each)

The 2023 AFC U-17 Asian Cup qualification was an international men's under-17 football competition which was held to decide the participating teams of the 2023 AFC U-17 Asian Cup. It was held as under-17 tournament for the first time after rebranding by AFC.

== Format changes ==
The AFC Executive Committee had approved several strategic recommendations put forward by the AFC Competitions Committee. One of which was the removal of zoning principles in the AFC's youth competitions.

== Draw ==
Of the 47 AFC member associations, a total of 44 teams entered the competition. The initial final tournament hosts Bahrain decided to participate in qualification despite having automatically qualified for the final tournament before its eventual withdrawal from hosting. Their matches will not be taken into account when calculating the group ranking and best second-placed teams among the groups at first, but will taken following their withdrawal from hosting. As a result, like UEFA Euro 2020, all teams who will qualify for the final tournament were all from qualification. The draw was held on 24 May 2022.

The 44 teams were allocated to 4 groups of five teams and 6 groups of four teams, with teams seeded according to their performance in the 2018 AFC U-16 Championship final tournament and qualification (overall ranking shown in parentheses; NR stands for non-ranked teams). A further restriction was also applied, with the ten teams serving as qualification group hosts drawn into separate groups.

On 16 August, FIFA Council unanimously decided to suspend India with immediate effect due to undue influence from third parties, which constitutes a serious violation of the FIFA Statutes. On 27 August, FIFA lifted the suspension, allowing India to compete.

On 28 September, Timor-Leste withdrew from the competition, citing financial reasons. Sri Lanka withdrew from the qualification on 4 October.

	Pot 1	Pot 2	Pot 3	Pot 4	Pot 5
Host Pot	2. **Tajikistan** (2) **(H)**; 4. **Australia** (4) **(H)**; 5. Indonesia (6) **(H)**; 6. Oman (7) **(H)**	13. Jordan (14) **(H)**; 14. **Vietnam** (15) **(H)**; 16. **Saudi Arabia** (17) **(H)**; 17. Bangladesh (18) **(H)**	21. **Uzbekistan** (22) **(H)**; 23. Kyrgyzstan (24) **(H)**		
Remaining Teams	1. **Japan** (1); 3. **South Korea** (3); 7. **India** (8); 8. **Iran** (9); 9. **Yemen** (10); 10. **Thailand** (11)	11. Iraq (12); 12. **Malaysia** (13); 15. **Afghanistan** (16); 18. **China** (19); 19. Hong Kong (20); 20. Brunei (21)	22. Myanmar (23); 24. Timor-Leste (25) **(W)**; 25. **Qatar** (26); 26. Palestine (27); 27. Cambodia (28); 28. Syria (29); 29. Singapore (30); 30. Chinese Taipei (31)	31. Nepal (32); 32. Lebanon (34); 33. **Laos** (35); 34. Philippines (36); 35. Mongolia (37); 36. Maldives (38); 37. Guam (39); 38. Bhutan (40); 39. Sri Lanka (42) **(W)**; 40. Northern Mariana Islands (43)	41. Kuwait (NR); 42. Turkmenistan (NR); 43. United Arab Emirates (NR); 44. Bahrain (33)

Notes

- Teams in **bold** qualified for the final tournament.
- (H): Qualification group hosts
- (Q): Final tournament hosts, automatically qualified regardless of qualification results
- (W): Withdrew after draw

Did not enter
- Macau
- North Korea
- Pakistan (suspended)

== Player eligibility ==
Players born on or after 1 January 2006 were eligible to compete in the tournament.

== Format ==
In each group, teams will play each other once at a centralised venue. The ten group winners and the six best runners-up will qualify for the final tournament.

=== Tiebreakers ===
Teams will be ranked according to points (3 points for a win, 1 point for a draw, 0 points for a loss), and if tied on points, the following tiebreaking criteria are applied, in the order given, to determine the rankings (Regulations Article 7.3):

1. Points in head-to-head matches among tied teams;
2. Goal difference in head-to-head matches among tied teams;
3. Goals scored in head-to-head matches among tied teams;
4. If more than two teams are tied, and after applying all head-to-head criteria above, a subset of teams are still tied, all head-to-head criteria above are reapplied exclusively to this subset of teams;
5. Goal difference in all group matches;
6. Goals scored in all group matches;
7. Penalty shoot-out if only two teams are tied and they met in the last round of the group;
8. Disciplinary points (yellow card = 1 point, red card as a result of two yellow cards = 3 points, direct red card = 3 points, yellow card followed by direct red card = 4 points);
9. Drawing of lots.

== Groups ==
The matches were played between 1–9 October 2022.

=== Group A ===
- All matches were held in Jordan.
- Times listed are UTC+3.

Pos	Team	Pld	W	D	L	GF	GA	GD	Pts	Qualification
1	Japan	4	4	0	0	15	0	+15	12	Final tournament
2	Turkmenistan	4	1	2	1	6	11	−5	5 (Note: Head-to-heads goals scored: Turkmenistan 4, Jordan 3, Syria 1.)	
3	Jordan (H)	4	1	2	1	6	6	0	5	
4	Syria	4	1	2	1	7	6	+1	5	
5	Philippines	4	0	0	4	3	14	−11	0	

Source: AFC
Rules for classification: Qualification tiebreakers
(H) Hosts
Notes:
1 October 2022
16:30

Turkmenistan	2–0	Philippines
Annaýew 20', 64' (pen.)	Report

Prince Mohammed Stadium, Zarqa
Referee: Abdullah Jamali (Kuwait)
1 October 2022
21:00

Syria	0–0	Jordan
	Report

Prince Mohammed Stadium, Zarqa
Referee: Nivon Robesh Gamini (Sri Lanka)

3 October 2022
16:30

Philippines	0–3	Japan
	Report	Michiwaki 43', 45'; Tokuda 85'

Prince Mohammed Stadium, Zarqa
3 October 2022
21:00

Turkmenistan	1–1	Syria
Titow 64'	Report	Mahmoud 72'

Prince Mohammed Stadium, Zarqa
Referee: Suhaizi Shukri (Malaysia)

5 October 2022
16:30

Japan	7–0	Turkmenistan
Tokuda 10', 17', 45+1', 51'; Kofie 60', 89'; Nawata 84'	Report

Prince Mohammed Stadium, Zarqa
Referee: Torphong Somsing (Thailand)
5 October 2022
21:00

Jordan	3–1	Philippines
Al-Khdour 58'; Sabra 86'; Abu Khalifa 90+2'	Report	Ekberg 78'

Prince Mohammed Stadium, Zarqa

7 October 2022
16:30

Syria	0–3	Japan
	Report	Shibata 4'; Nawata 42'; Tokuda 67'

Prince Mohammed Stadium, Zarqa
Referee: Payam Heidari (Iran)
7 October 2022
21:00

Jordan	3–3	Turkmenistan
Sabra 9'; Abu Aqoula 52', 81'	Report	Titow 7', 47'; Annaýew 84' (pen.)

Prince Mohammed Stadium, Zarqa
Referee: Nivon Robesh Gamini (Sri Lanka)

9 October 2022
16:30

Philippines	2–6	Syria
Andan 63'; Collo 64'	Report	Al-Mahmoud 51'; Mahmoud 61'; Al-Hindi 75', 90+1'; Dahan 79'; Issa 82'

Prince Mohammed Stadium, Zarqa
Referee: Halim Shirzad (Afghanistan)
9 October 2022
21:00

Japan	2–0	Jordan
Khaleel 29' (o.g.); Michiwaki 39'	Report

Prince Mohammed Stadium, Zarqa
Referee: Abdullah Jamali (Kuwait)

=== Group B ===
- All matches were held in Indonesia.
- Times listed are UTC+7.

Pos	Team	Pld	W	D	L	GF	GA	GD	Pts	Qualification
1	Malaysia	4	3	1	0	13	4	+9	10	Final tournament
2	Indonesia (H)	4	3	0	1	20	7	+13	9	
3	United Arab Emirates	4	2	0	2	17	9	+8	6	
4	Palestine	4	1	0	3	7	10	−3	3	
5	Guam	4	0	1	3	1	28	−27	1	

Source: AFC
Rules for classification: Qualification tiebreakers
(H) Hosts
1 October 2022
16:00

Palestine	0–4	Malaysia
	Report	Anjasmirza 51'; Faris 69'; Arami 75'; Zainurhakimi 87'

Pakansari Stadium, Cibinong
Referee: Zaid Thamer (Iraq)
1 October 2022
20:00

United Arab Emirates	9–0	Guam
Al-Marzouki 12', 86', 90+2'; Malallah 31', 66'; Juma'a 36'; Abdullah 43'; Al-Suwaidi 75'; Jamal 90'	Report

Pakansari Stadium, Cibinong
Referee: Asker Nadjafaliev (Uzbekistan)

3 October 2022
16:00

United Arab Emirates	4–3	Palestine
Amer 22' (pen.); Juma'a 26'; Abdullah 70'; Malallah 86'	Report	Alshaer 3'; Radi 18'; Awawda 45'

Pakansari Stadium, Cibinong
Attendance: 0 (Note: All matches in Group B starting 3 October were played behind closed doors due to the Kanjuruhan Stadium disaster.)
Referee: Kim Woo-sung (South Korea)
3 October 2022
20:00

Guam	0–14	Indonesia
	Report	Arkhan 8', 11', 26' (pen.), 35'; Narendra 27'; Riski 32'; Zaky 45'; Moss 46' (o.g.); Jehan 48'; Gaoshirowi 59'; Habil 79'; Figo 84'; Nabil 88' (pen.); Ji Da-bin 90'

Pakansari Stadium, Cibinong
Attendance: 0
Referee: Mohammed Al-Shammari (Qatar)

5 October 2022
16:00

Malaysia	1–1	Guam
Qahir 73'	Report	Meyar 84'

Pakansari Stadium, Cibinong
Attendance: 0
Referee: Jonathan Barreiro (Australia)
5 October 2022
20:00

Indonesia	3–2	United Arab Emirates
Nabil 18'; Arkhan 30', 54'	Report	Malallah 32'; Abdullah 39'

Pakansari Stadium, Cibinong
Attendance: 0
Referee: Kassem Al-Hatmi (Oman)

7 October 2022
16:00

Malaysia	3–2	United Arab Emirates
Arami 45+1'; Anjasmirza 51'; Faris 90+7'	Report	Amer 77' (pen.); Al-Marzouki 85'

Pakansari Stadium, Cibinong
Attendance: 0
Referee: Zaid Thamer (Iraq)
7 October 2022
20:00

Palestine	0–2	Indonesia
	Report	Al-Fuqaha 8' (o.g.); Habil 51'

Pakansari Stadium, Cibinong
Attendance: 0
Referee: Mohammed Al-Shammari (Qatar)

9 October 2022
16:00

Guam	0–4	Palestine
	Report	Zghir 24'; Barabra 26', 40', 78'

Pakansari Stadium, Cibinong
Attendance: 0
Referee: Jonathan Barreiro (Australia)
9 October 2022
20:00

Indonesia	1–5	Malaysia
Arkhan 90+3'	Report	Zainurhakimi 18'; Arami 20', 39' (pen.); Anjasmirza 24'; Afiq 27'

Pakansari Stadium, Cibinong
Attendance: 0
Referee: Kim Woo-sung (South Korea)

=== Group C ===
- All matches were held in Oman.
- Times listed are UTC+4.

Pos	Team	Pld	W	D	L	GF	GA	GD	Pts	Qualification
1	Qatar	4	3	1	0	9	4	+5	10	Final tournament
2	Oman (H)	4	2	1	1	5	3	+2	7	
3	Iraq	4	1	2	1	4	2	+2	5	
4	Bahrain	4	1	1	2	2	6	−4	4	
5	Lebanon	4	0	1	3	2	7	−5	1	

Source: AFC
Rules for classification: Qualification tiebreakers
(H) Hosts
1 October 2022
17:00

Qatar	2–1	Iraq
Khudhair 28' (o.g.); Al-Shaaibi 39'	Report	Al Darraji 2'

Sultan Qaboos Sports Complex, Muscat
Referee: Ahmad Al Ali (Kuwait)
1 October 2022
20:45

Bahrain	1–0	Lebanon
Bassam 68' (pen.)	Report

Sultan Qaboos Sports Complex, Muscat
Referee: Kim Hee-gon (South Korea)

3 October 2022
17:00

Lebanon	1–2	Oman
Yassine 76'	Report	Al-Maqbali 2'; Al-Jabri 90+6'

Sultan Qaboos Sports Complex, Muscat
Referee: Alex King (Australia)
3 October 2022
20:45

Bahrain	1–1	Qatar
Bassam 55'	Report	Shahabi 10'

Sultan Qaboos Sports Complex, Muscat
Referee: Akhrol Risquallev (Uzbekistan)

5 October 2022
17:00

Oman	2–0	Bahrain
Al-Breiki 45+2' (pen.), 77'	Report

Sultan Qaboos Sports Complex, Muscat
Referee: Khalid Al-Turais (Saudi Arabia)
5 October 2022
20:45

Iraq	0–0	Lebanon
	Report

Sultan Qaboos Sports Complex, Muscat
Referee: Sadullo Gulmurodi (Tajikistan)

7 October 2022
17:00

Iraq	3–0	Bahrain
Al Darraji 47'; Ali 70'; Jawad 85'	Report

Sultan Qaboos Sports Complex, Muscat
Referee: Alex King (Australia)
7 October 2022
20:45

Qatar	2–1	Oman
Adel 62' (pen.), 85'	Report	Al-Shekaily 7'

Sultan Qaboos Sports Complex, Muscat
Referee: Ahmad Al Ali (Kuwait)

9 October 2022
17:00

Lebanon	1–4	Qatar
Mazeed 74' (o.g.)	Report	Jamshid 8'; Nasir 63'; Shahabi 68'; Al-Ahrak 80'

Sultan Qaboos Sports Complex, Muscat
Referee: Sadullo Gulmurodi (Tajikistan)
9 October 2022
20:45

Oman	0–0	Iraq
	Report

Sultan Qaboos Sports Complex, Muscat
Referee: Kim Hee-gon (South Korea)

=== Group D ===
- All matches were held in Saudi Arabia.
- Times listed are UTC+3.

Pos	Team	Pld	W	D	L	GF	GA	GD	Pts	Qualification
1	Saudi Arabia (H)	4	4	0	0	19	2	+17	12	Final tournament
2	India	4	3	0	1	13	3	+10	9	Final tournament
3	Kuwait	4	2	0	2	8	5	+3	6	
4	Myanmar	4	1	0	3	8	11	−3	3	
5	Maldives	4	0	0	4	0	27	−27	0	

Source: AFC
Rules for classification: Qualification tiebreakers
(H) Hosts
1 October 2022
18:15

Kuwait	6–0	Maldives
Awadh 7'; Al-Sarraf 12'; Al-Kandari 60'; Al-Anbari 69'; Al-Hajjei 74', 78'	Report

Prince Saud bin Jalawi Stadium, Khobar
Referee: Dayirbek Abdildaev (Kyrgyzstan)
1 October 2022
21:30

Myanmar	0–6	Saudi Arabia
	Report	Al-Jadaani 7', 52' (pen.); Haji 10'; Al-Yuhaybi 37'; Al-Bishri 45+3'; Aung Zaw Myo 72' (o.g.)

Prince Saud bin Jalawi Stadium, Khobar
Referee: Ismaeel Habib Ali (Bahrain)

3 October 2022
18:15

Kuwait	1–0	Myanmar
Al-Mutairi 78'	Report

Prince Saud bin Jalawi Stadium, Khobar
Referee: Chen Hsin-chuan (Chinese Taipei)
3 October 2022
21:30

Maldives	0–5	India
	Report	Guite 11'; Fanai 25'; Aman 59'; Yendrembam 67' (pen.); Oinam 71'

Prince Saud bin Jalawi Stadium, Khobar
Referee: Yusuke Araki (Japan)

5 October 2022
18:15

Saudi Arabia	9–0	Maldives
Haji 22'; Al-Janahi 29', 81'; Al-Attar 36', 38', 55'; Al-Dhafiri 63' (pen.); Hibah 64'; Yousef 80'	Report

Prince Saud bin Jalawi Stadium, Khobar
Referee: Baraa Aisha (Palestine)
5 October 2022
21:30

India	3–0	Kuwait
Gangte 16', 71'; Thingujam 66'	Report

Prince Saud bin Jalawi Stadium, Khobar
Referee: Yahya Al-Mulla (United Arab Emirates)

7 October 2022
18:15

Myanmar	1–4	India
Htoo Wai Yan 60'	Report	Guite 23', 34'; Gangte 32' (pen.), 44'

Prince Saud bin Jalawi Stadium, Khobar
Referee: Dayirbek Abdildaev (Kyrgyzstan)
7 October 2022
21:30

Saudi Arabia	2–1	Kuwait
Al-Bishri 20', 29'	Report	Boodai 48'

Prince Mohamed bin Fahd Stadium, Dammam
Referee: Yusuke Araki (Japan)

9 October 2022
21:00

Maldives	0–7	Myanmar
	Report	Saw Myo Zaw 7', 28'; Pyae Sone Aung 34', 62'; Myat Phone Khant 45'; Aung Zaw Myo 69'; Myo Min Khant 90+1'

Prince Saud bin Jalawi Stadium, Khobar
Referee: Ismaeel Habib Ali (Bahrain)
9 October 2022
21:00

India	1–2	Saudi Arabia
Gangte 90+4'	Report	Haji 22', 58' (pen.)

Prince Mohamed bin Fahd Stadium, Dammam
Referee: Yahya Al-Mulla (United Arab Emirates)

=== Group E ===
- All matches were held in Bangladesh.
- Times listed are UTC+6.

Pos	Team	Pld	W	D	L	GF	GA	GD	Pts	Qualification
1	Yemen	3	3	0	0	18	0	+18	9	Final tournament
2	Bangladesh (H)	3	2	0	1	4	5	−1	6	
3	Singapore	3	1	0	2	2	8	−6	3	
4	Bhutan	3	0	0	3	0	11	−11	0	

Source: AFC
Rules for classification: Qualification tiebreakers
(H) Hosts
5 October 2022
16:00

Yemen	8–0	Bhutan
Abdullah 10'; Qasem 16'; K. Moqbel 21'; Abdulnabi 41'; Noman 44' (pen.); Al-Brwany 61'; Al-Turaiqi 74'; Al-Gumaei 85'	Report

Bir Sherestha Shaheed Shipahi Mostafa Kamal Stadium, Dhaka
Referee: Rustam Lutfullin (Uzbekistan)
5 October 2022
19:00

Bangladesh	2–1	Singapore
Brayden Goh 10' (o.g.); Isaac Lee 90+7' (o.g.)	Report	Syazwan 28'

Bir Sherestha Shaheed Shipahi Mostafa Kamal Stadium, Dhaka
Referee: Tam Ping Wun (Hong Kong)

7 October 2022
16:00

Singapore	0–6	Yemen
	Report	Al-Shaban 30'; Abdulnabi 42'; Radman 44'; Al-Salami 56', 68'; M. Moqbel 86'

Bir Sherestha Shaheed Shipahi Mostafa Kamal Stadium, Dhaka
Referee: Ramachandran Venkatesh (India)
7 October 2022
19:00

Bhutan	0–2	Bangladesh
	Report	Nazim 10'; Hemel 73'

Bir Sherestha Shaheed Shipahi Mostafa Kamal Stadium, Dhaka
Referee: Seyed Vahid Kazemi (Iran)

9 October 2022
16:00

Singapore	1–0	Bhutan
Harris 45+1'	Report

Bir Sherestha Shaheed Shipahi Mostafa Kamal Stadium, Dhaka
Referee: Sayyodjon Zainiddinov (Tajikistan)
9 October 2022
19:00

Yemen	4–0	Bangladesh
Al-Turaiqi 24' (pen.); Noman 37'; Qasem 45+1'; Al-Brwany 78'	Report

Bir Sherestha Shaheed Shipahi Mostafa Kamal Stadium, Dhaka
Referee: Rustam Lutfullin (Uzbekistan)

=== Group F ===
- All matches were held in Vietnam.
- Times listed are UTC+7.

Pos	Team	Pld	W	D	L	GF	GA	GD	Pts	Qualification
1	Vietnam (H)	3	3	0	0	12	0	+12	9	Final tournament
2	Thailand	3	2	0	1	6	4	+2	6	Final tournament
3	Chinese Taipei	3	1	0	2	5	9	−4	3	
4	Nepal	3	0	0	3	2	12	−10	0	

Source: AFC
Rules for classification: Qualification tiebreakers
(H) Hosts
5 October 2022
16:00

Thailand	3–0	Nepal
Tontawan 30', 65'; Thanakrit 79'	Report

Việt Trì Stadium, Việt Trì
Referee: Chae Sang-hyeop (South Korea)
5 October 2022
19:00

Vietnam	4–0	Chinese Taipei
Bùi Hoàng Sơn 19'; Nguyễn Lê Phát 73', 82'; Nguyễn Hoàng Anh 80'	Report

Việt Trì Stadium, Việt Trì
Referee: Majed Al Shamrani (Saudi Arabia)

7 October 2022
16:00

Chinese Taipei	1–3	Thailand
Lin Hai-cheng 14'	Report	Tontawan 12', 88'; Phongpech 55'

Việt Trì Stadium, Việt Trì
Referee: Sinan Hussain (Maldives)
7 October 2022
19:00

Nepal	0–5	Vietnam
	Report	Nguyễn Công Phương 7'; Bùi Hoàng Sơn 12'; Vi Đình Thượng 16'; Lê Đình Long Vũ 29'; Huỳnh Văn Danh 90+3'

Việt Trì Stadium, Việt Trì
Referee: Hiroki Kasahara (Japan)

9 October 2022
16:00

Chinese Taipei	4–2	Nepal
Lin Hai-cheng 3', 89'; Tai Yan-yao 28'; Lu Yi-ting 80'	Report	Laksam 10'; Singh 61'

Việt Trì Stadium, Việt Trì
Referee: Hasan Akrami (Iran)
9 October 2022
19:00

Thailand	0–3	Vietnam
	Report	Nguyễn Công Phương 20'; Lê Đình Long Vũ 25'; Phan Thanh Đức Thiện 39'

Việt Trì Stadium, Việt Trì
Attendance: 8,668
Referee: Majed Al Shamrani (Saudi Arabia)

=== Group G ===
- All matches were held in Australia.
- Times listed are UTC+11.

Pos	Team	Pld	W	D	L	GF	GA	GD	Pts	Qualification
1	Australia (H)	3	3	0	0	36	1	+35	9	Final tournament
2	China	3	2	0	1	21	3	+18	6	Final tournament
3	Cambodia	3	1	0	2	4	19	−15	3	
4	Northern Mariana Islands	3	0	0	3	0	38	−38	0	

Source: AFC
Rules for classification: Qualification tiebreakers
(H) Hosts
5 October 2022
15:00

China	9–0	Cambodia
Zhang Junjie 16'; Huang Kaijun 24'; Wang Yudong 26', 59', 61'; Kuai Jiwen 45+1'; Wang Haobin 86'; Li Ming 87'; Ouyang Jiaxin 90+2'	Report

Shepparton Sports City, Shepparton
Referee: Ammar Mahfoodh (Bahrain)
5 October 2022
19:30

Australia	23–0	Northern Mariana Islands
Irankunda 2', 6', 16', 38', 71'; Hately 28', 43', 48'; Glasson 32', 37', 59', 64'; Di Pizio 35' (pen.), 54'; Pearman 43'; Antoniou 53', 63'; Quintal 56', 69'; Parkes 75'; Lebib 77'; Ngewakl 89' (o.g.); Dovison 90+1'	Report

Shepparton Sports City, Shepparton
Attendance: 484
Referee: Yudi Nurcahya (Indonesia)

7 October 2022
15:00

Northern Mariana Islands	0–11	China
	Report	Huang Kaijun 13'; Zhang Junjie 26', 31'; Liu Chengyu 30', 42'; Mei Shuaijun 34' (pen.); Wang Haobin 38'; Wang Yudong 60', 71', 80', 90+2'

Shepparton Sports City, Shepparton
Referee: Songkran Bunmeekiart (Thailand)
7 October 2022
19:45

Cambodia	0–10	Australia
	Report	Ron Chongmieng 5' (o.g.); Glasson 13'; Hately 36', 73'; Irankunda 49'; Lebib 52'; Quintal 72' (pen.), 81'; Dovison 77'; Di Pizio 90'

Shepparton Sports City, Shepparton
Referee: Choi Hyun-jai (South Korea)

9 October 2022
15:00

Australia	3–1	China
Irankunda 7' (pen.), 65'; Di Pizio 70'	Report	Wang Yudong 25'

Shepparton Sports City, Shepparton
Referee: Ammar Mahfoodh (Bahrain)
9 October 2022
19:30

Cambodia	4–0	Northern Mariana Islands
Var David 21'; Sou Menghong 40'; Tum Makara 45+1'; Soun Makara 90+1'	Report

Shepparton Sports City, Shepparton
Referee: Abdul Hakim Haidi (Brunei)

=== Group H ===
- All matches were held in Tajikistan.
- Times listed are UTC+5.

Pos	Team	Pld	W	D	L	GF	GA	GD	Pts	Qualification
1	Tajikistan (H)	2	2	0	0	5	0	+5	6	Final tournament
2	Afghanistan	2	1	0	1	5	2	+3	3	Final tournament
3	Mongolia	2	0	0	2	0	8	−8	0	
4	Timor-Leste (Note: Timor-Leste withdrew from the tournament on 28 September 2022.)	0	0	0	0	0	0	0	0	Withdrew

Source: AFC
Rules for classification: Qualification tiebreakers
(H) Hosts
Notes:
5 October 2022
19:00

Mongolia	0–3	Tajikistan
	Report	Balchindorj 28' (o.g.); Sulaymonov 45'; Saidov 48'

Pamir Stadium, Dushanbe
Referee: Mohammad Ghabayen (Jordan)

7 October 2022
19:00

Afghanistan	5–0	Mongolia
Niazi 21', 33', 39'; Ramazani 74'; Rahimi 89'	Report

Pamir Stadium, Dushanbe
Referee: Mohamad Issa (Lebanon)

9 October 2022
19:00

Tajikistan	2–0	Afghanistan
Khujaev 21'; Jamshedzoda 80'	Report

Pamir Stadium, Dushanbe
Referee: Mahmood Al-Majarafi (Oman)

=== Group I ===
- All matches were held in Kyrgyzstan.
- Times listed are UTC+6.

Pos	Team	Pld	W	D	L	GF	GA	GD	Pts	Qualification
1	Iran	3	3	0	0	18	1	+17	9	Final tournament
2	Laos	3	2	0	1	7	4	+3	6	Final tournament
3	Kyrgyzstan (H)	3	1	0	2	3	7	−4	3	
4	Hong Kong	3	0	0	3	2	18	−16	0	

Source: AFC
Rules for classification: Qualification tiebreakers
(H) Hosts
5 October 2022
15:00

Iran	3–0	Laos
Taheri 67'; Askari 83'; Ghandipour 90+3'	Report

Dolen Omurzakov Stadium, Bishkek
Referee: Razlan Joffri Ali (Malaysia)
5 October 2022
19:30

Hong Kong	1–2	Kyrgyzstan
Timothy Chow 9'	Report	Kubanychbek Uulu 38'; Sharipov 75'

Dolen Omurzakov Stadium, Bishkek
Attendance: 1,277
Referee: Ammar Ashkanani (Kuwait)

7 October 2022
15:00

Laos	5–0	Hong Kong
Sayphone 16', 48'; Khammanh 30'; Peter 73', 79'	Report

Dolen Omurzakov Stadium, Bishkek
Referee: Ahmad Alaeddine (Lebanon)
7 October 2022
19:30

Kyrgyzstan	0–4	Iran
	Report	Taheri 30'; Andarz 57'; Ghandipour 77'; Homaeifard 82'

Dolen Omurzakov Stadium, Bishkek
Referee: Mohammad Arafah (Jordan)

9 October 2022
15:00

Iran	11–1	Hong Kong
Ghandipour 13', 16', 65', 90+2'; Gholizadeh 29', 66', 88'; Taheri 41', 52', 68'; Askari 81'	Report	Chan Ho Ka 67'

Dolen Omurzakov Stadium, Bishkek
Referee: Clifford Daypuyat (Philippines)
9 October 2022
19:30

Kyrgyzstan	1–2	Laos
Emilbekov 82'	Report	Pheatsamone 16'; Peter 90+4'

Dolen Omurzakov Stadium, Bishkek
Referee: Razlan Joffri Ali (Malaysia)

=== Group J ===
- All matches were held in Uzbekistan.
- Times listed are UTC+5.

Pos	Team	Pld	W	D	L	GF	GA	GD	Pts	Qualification
1	Uzbekistan (H)	2	2	0	0	17	2	+15	6	Final tournament
2	South Korea	2	1	0	1	12	3	+9	3	Final tournament
3	Brunei	2	0	0	2	0	24	−24	0	
4	Sri Lanka (Note: Sri Lanka withdrew from the tournament on 4 October 2022.)	0	0	0	0	0	0	0	0	Withdrew

Source: AFC
Rules for classification: Qualification tiebreakers
(H) Hosts
Notes:
5 October 2022
18:00

Brunei	0–14	Uzbekistan
	Report	Uktamov 8'; Saidov 10'; Mirzaev 19', 23', 31'; Turgunboev 30', 81', 89'; Abdullaev 42'; Shodiboev 44'; Karimov 75'; Abraev 82'; Mukhtorov 82'; Tulkunbekov 88'

JAR Stadium, Tashkent
Referee: Shukri Al Hanfosh (Saudi Arabia)

7 October 2022
18:00

Uzbekistan	3–2	South Korea
Yu Byeong-heon 71' (o.g.); Mirzaev 81'; Olimov 90'	Report	Kang Min-woo 26'; Yu Byeong-heon 75'

JAR Stadium, Tashkent
Referee: Bijan Heidari (Iran)

9 October 2022
18:00

South Korea	10–0	Brunei
Kang Ju-hyeok 14', 25', 33', 56', 87'; Hwang Ji-sung 18'; Yu Byeong-heon 30'; Yoon Do-yong 58'; Kim Bum-hwan 63' (pen.); Ko Jong-hyun 90+3'	Report

Pakhtakor Central Stadium, Tashkent
Referee: Sultan Al-Hammadi (United Arab Emirates)

== Ranking of second-placed teams ==
Due to groups having a different number of teams, the results against the fourth-placed teams in groups with four teams, or the results against the fourth and fifth-placed teams in groups with five teams, was not considered for this ranking.

Originally only the five best runners-up would qualify, but due to Bahrain’s withdrawal as the final tournament host, the sixth-best runner-up also qualified.

Pos	Grp	Team	Pld	W	D	L	GF	GA	GD	Pts	Qualification
1	J	South Korea	2	1	0	1	12	3	+9	3	Final tournament
2	G	China	2	1	0	1	10	3	+7	3	Final tournament
3	H	Afghanistan	2	1	0	1	5	2	+3	3	Final tournament
4	D	India	2	1	0	1	4	2	+2	3	Final tournament
5	F	Thailand	2	1	0	1	3	4	−1	3	Final tournament
6	I	Laos	2	1	0	1	2	4	−2	3	Final tournament
7	B	Indonesia	2	1	0	1	4	7	−3	3	
8	E	Bangladesh	2	1	0	1	2	5	−3	3	
9	C	Oman	2	0	1	1	1	2	−1	1	
10	A	Turkmenistan	2	0	1	1	3	10	−7	1	

Source: Group stage
Rules for classification: 1) points; 2) goal difference; 3) goals scored; 4) disciplinary points; 5) drawing of lots.

== Qualified teams ==
A total of 16 teams including hosts qualified for the final tournament.

Team	Qualified as	Qualified on	Previous appearances in AFC U-16 Championship^{1}
Japan	Group A winners	7 October 2022	15 (1985, 1988, **1994**, 1996, 1998, 2000, 2002, 2004, **2006**, 2008, 2010, 2012, 2014, 2016, **2018**)
Malaysia	Group B winners	9 October 2022	5 (2004, 2008, 2014, 2016, 2018)
Qatar	Group C winners	7 October 2022	10 (1985, 1986, 1988, **1990**, 1992, 1994, 1998, 2002, 2004, 2014)
Saudi Arabia	Group D winners	9 October 2022	10 (**1985**, 1986, **1988**, 1992, 1994, 2006, 2008, 2012, 2014, 2016)
Yemen	Group E winners	9 October 2022	5 (2002, 2006, 2012, 2016, 2018)
Vietnam	Group F winners	9 October 2022	7 (2000, 2002, 2004, 2006, 2010, 2016, 2018)
Australia	Group G winners	9 October 2022	6 (2008, 2010, 2012, 2014, 2016, 2018)
Tajikistan	Group H winners	9 October 2022	3 (2006, 2010, 2018)
Iran	Group I winners	7 October 2022	11 (1996, 1998, 2000, 2004, 2006, **2008**, 2010, 2012, 2014, 2016, 2018)
Uzbekistan	Group J winners	7 October 2022	9 (1994, 1996, 2002, 2004, 2008, 2010, **2012**, 2014, 2016)
South Korea	Best runners-up	9 October 2022	14 (**1986**, 1988, 1990, 1994, 1996, 1998, **2002**, 2004, 2006, 2008, 2012, 2014, 2016, 2018)
China	2nd best runners-up	9 October 2022	14 (1985, 1988, 1990, **1992**, 1994, 1996, 2000, 2002, **2004**, 2006, 2008, 2010, 2012, 2014)
Afghanistan	3rd best runners-up	9 October 2022	1 (2018)
India	4th best runners-up	9 October 2022	8 (1990, 1996, 2002, 2004, 2008, 2012, 2016, 2018)
Thailand	5th best runners-up	9 October 2022	11 (1985, 1988, 1992, 1996, **1998**, 2000, 2004, 2012, 2014, 2016, 2018)
Laos	6th best runners-up	9 October 2022	2 (2004, 2012)

^{1} Bold indicates champions for that year. Italic indicates hosts for that year.

== Goalscorers ==
There were 344 goals scored in 70 matches, for an average of 4.91 goals per match.

8 goals

- (Australia) Nestory Irankunda
- (China) Wang Yudong

7 goals

- (Indonesia) Arkhan Kaka

6 goals

- (Iran) Reza Ghandipour
- (Japan) Homare Tokuda

5 goals

- (Australia) Mitchell Glasson
- (Australia) Max Hately
- (India) Thanglalsoun Gangte
- (Iran) Kasra Taheri
- (South Korea) Kang Ju-hyeok

4 goals

- (Australia) Miguel Di Pizio
- (Australia) Tiago Quintal
- (Malaysia) Arami Wafiy
- (Saudi Arabia) Talal Haji
- (Thailand) Tontawan Puntamunee
- (United Arab Emirates) Walid Malallah
- (United Arab Emirates) Abdulaziz Al-Marzouki
- (Uzbekistan) Lazizbek Mirzaev

3 goals

- (Afghanistan) Hakim Niazi
- (China) Zhang Junjie
- (Chinese Taipei) Lin Hai-cheng
- (India) Vanlalpeka Guite
- (Iran) Esmaeil Gholizadeh
- (Japan) Yutaka Michiwaki
- (Laos) Peter Phanthavong
- (Malaysia) Anjasmirza Saharudin
- (Palestine) Amer Barabra
- (Saudi Arabia) Ramiz Al-Attar
- (Saudi Arabia) Nawaf Al-Bishri
- (Turkmenistan) Enwer Annaýew
- (Turkmenistan) Denis Titow
- (United Arab Emirates) Ghaith Abdullah
- (Uzbekistan) Abdulkhamid Turgunboev

2 goals

- (Australia) Peter Antoniou
- (Australia) Campbell Dovison
- (Australia) Andriano Lebib
- (Bahrain) Sami Bassam
- (China) Huang Kaijun
- (China) Liu Chengyu
- (China) Wang Haobin
- (Indonesia) Habil Akbar
- (Indonesia) Nabil Asyura
- (Iran) Mohammad Askari
- (Iraq) Ali Akbar Al Darraji
- (Japan) Shota Kofie
- (Japan) Gaku Nawata
- (Jordan) Azzedine Abu Aqoula
- (Jordan) Ibrahim Sabra
- (Kuwait) Mohammad Al-Hajjei
- (Laos) Sayphone Keohanam
- (Malaysia) Faris Danish
- (Malaysia) Zainurhakimi Zain
- (Myanmar) Pyae Sone Aung
- (Myanmar) Saw Myo Zaw
- (Oman) Tamim Al-Breiki
- (Qatar) Bassam Adel
- (Qatar) Ali Mohammad Shahabi
- (Saudi Arabia) Nawaf Al-Jadaani
- (Saudi Arabia) Nawaf Al-Janahi
- (South Korea) Yu Byeong-heon
- (Syria) Alaa Al-Deen Al-Hindi
- (Syria) Homam Mahmoud
- (United Arab Emirates) Saeed Amer
- (United Arab Emirates) Muhammad Juma'a
- (Vietnam) Bùi Hoàng Sơn
- (Vietnam) Lê Đình Long Vũ
- (Vietnam) Nguyễn Công Phương
- (Vietnam) Nguyễn Lê Phát
- (Yemen) Abdulrahman Abdulnabi
- (Yemen) Mohammad Ameer Al-Brwany
- (Yemen) Mohammad Wahib Noman
- (Yemen) Adel Qasem
- (Yemen) Haitham Al-Salami
- (Yemen) Anwar Al-Turaiqi

1 goal

- (Afghanistan) Ali Reza Rahimi
- (Afghanistan) Ali Ramazani
- (Australia) Andre Parkes
- (Australia) Jaylen Pearman
- (Bangladesh) Moltagim Alam Hemel
- (Bangladesh) Mohammed Nazim Uddin
- (Cambodia) Makara Soun
- (Cambodia) Menghong Sou
- (Cambodia) David Var
- (Cambodia) Tum Makara
- (China) Kuai Jiwen
- (China) Li Ming
- (China) Mei Shuaijun
- (China) Ouyang Jiaxin
- (Chinese Taipei) Lu Yi-ting
- (Chinese Taipei) Tai Yan-yao
- (Guam) Riku Meyar
- (Hong Kong) Chan Ho Ka
- (Hong Kong) Timothy Chow
- (India) Aman
- (India) Lalhmingchhuanga Fanai
- (India) Phoenix Oinam
- (India) Korou Singh Thingujam
- (India) Boby Singh Yendrembam
- (Indonesia) Figo Dennis
- (Indonesia) Muhamad Gaoshirowi
- (Indonesia) Jehan Pahlevi
- (Indonesia) Ji Da-bin
- (Indonesia) Riski Afrisal
- (Indonesia) Sulthan Zaky
- (Indonesia) Narendra Tegar
- (Iran) Nima Andarz
- (Iran) Alireza Homaeifard
- (Iraq) Bawan Ali
- (Iraq) Ameer Jawad
- (Japan) Shotaro Shibata
- (Jordan) Amin Abu Khalifa
- (Jordan) Abdelrahman Al-Khdour
- (Kuwait) Soud Al-Anbari
- (Kuwait) Hussain Awadh
- (Kuwait) Ahmad Boodai
- (Kuwait) Soud Al-Kandari
- (Kuwait) Yousef Al-Mutairi
- (Kuwait) Fadel Al-Sarraf
- (Kyrgyzstan) Argen Emilbekov
- (Kyrgyzstan) Manas Kubanychbek Uulu
- (Kyrgyzstan) Aidar Sharipov
- (Laos) Khammanh Thapaseuth
- (Laos) Pheatsamone Sihathep
- (Lebanon) Mohamad Yassine
- (Malaysia) Afiq Danish Zulkifli
- (Malaysia) Qahir Dzakirin
- (Myanmar) Aung Zaw Myo
- (Myanmar) Htoo Wai Yan
- (Myanmar) Myat Phone Khant
- (Myanmar) Myo Min Khant
- (Nepal) Prashant Laksam
- (Nepal) Dhan Singh
- (Oman) Omar Al-Jabri
- (Oman) Abdullah Al-Maqbali
- (Oman) Al-Haitham Al-Shekaily
- (Palestine) Tareq Awawda
- (Palestine) Mahmoud Radi
- (Palestine) Husam Alshaer
- (Palestine) Mohammed Zghir
- (Philippines) Lucas Andan
- (Philippines) Joaquin Collo
- (Philippines) Bacchus Ekberg
- (Qatar) Esmail Al-Ahrak
- (Qatar) Tahsin Jamshid
- (Qatar) Ahmad Nasir
- (Qatar) Khalid Al-Shaaibi
- (Saudi Arabia) Jathub Al-Dhafiri
- (Saudi Arabia) Ziyad Hibah
- (Saudi Arabia) Faris Yousef
- (Saudi Arabia) Amar Al-Yuhaybi
- (Singapore) Harris Ilhan
- (Singapore) Muhammad Syazwan
- (South Korea) Hwang Ji-sung
- (South Korea) Kang Min-woo
- (South Korea) Kim Bum-hwan
- (South Korea) Ko Jong-hyun
- (South Korea) Yoon Do-yong
- (Syria) Anas Dahan
- (Syria) Kawa Issa
- (Syria) Hasan Al-Mahmoud
- (Tajikistan) Dilovari Jamshedzoda
- (Tajikistan) Bekhruz Khujaev
- (Tajikistan) Sheravgan Saidov
- (Tajikistan) Abubakr Sulaymonov
- (Thailand) Thanakrit Jampalee
- (Thailand) Phongpech Aiemsaard
- (United Arab Emirates) Ali Jamal
- (United Arab Emirates) Hilal Al-Suwaidi
- (Uzbekistan) Dilshod Abdullaev
- (Uzbekistan) Kuvonchbek Abraev
- (Uzbekistan) Ollobergan Karimov
- (Uzbekistan) Zikrillokhon Mukhtorov
- (Uzbekistan) Mamadalikhon Olimov
- (Uzbekistan) Amirbek Saidov
- (Uzbekistan) Shodiyor Shodiboev
- (Uzbekistan) Azizbek Tulkunbekov
- (Uzbekistan) Ozodbek Uktamov
- (Vietnam) Huỳnh Văn Danh
- (Vietnam) Nguyễn Hoàng Anh
- (Vietnam) Phan Thanh Đức Thiện
- (Vietnam) Vi Đình Thượng
- (Yemen) Abdulrahman Abdullah
- (Yemen) Ahmad Al-Gumaei
- (Yemen) Esam Radman
- (Yemen) Mohammad Khaled Moqbel
- (Yemen) Mokhtar Muwafaq Moqbel
- (Yemen) Saeed Al-Shaban

1 own goal

- (Cambodia) Ron Chongmieng (against Australia)
- (Guam) Donovan Moss (against Indonesia)
- (Iraq) Kameran Ahmed Khudhair (against Qatar)
- (Jordan) Ahmad Khaleel (against Japan)
- (Mongolia) Itgel Balchindorj (against Tajikistan)
- (Myanmar) Aung Zaw Myo (against Saudi Arabia)
- (Northern Mariana Islands) Nolan Ngewakl (against Australia)
- (Palestine) Ibrahim Al-Fuqaha (against Indonesia)
- (Qatar) Rashid Mazeed (against Lebanon)
- (Singapore) Brayden Goh (against Bangladesh)
- (Singapore) Isaac Lee (against Bangladesh)
- (South Korea) Yu Byeong-heon (against Uzbekistan)

== See also ==
- 2023 AFC U-20 Asian Cup
- 2023 AFC U-20 Asian Cup qualification
- 2023 AFC U-17 Asian Cup
