= Lazizbek Mirzaev =

Uzbek footballer (born 2006)

Personal information
- Full name: Lazizbek Azizovich Mirzaev
- Date of birth: 5 October 2006 (age 20)
- Place of birth: Tashkent, Uzbekistan
- Position: Midfielder

Team information
- Current team: Lokomotiv Tashkent (on loan from Gazalkent)
- Number: 71

Youth career
- 2019–2021: Odil Ahmedov FA
- 2022: Lokomotiv Tashkent

Senior career*
Years	Team	Apps	(Gls)
2022–2024	Lokomotiv Tashkent	21	(0)
2025–2026	Leganés	0	(0)
2026–	Gazalkent		
2026–	→ Lokomotiv Tashkent (loan)	2	(1)

International career^{‡}
2021–2023	Uzbekistan U17	16	(3)
2024–2025	Uzbekistan U20	4	(2)
- * Club domestic league appearances and goals as of 19 March 2026 ‡ National team caps and goals as of 12 December 2024

Lazizbek Mirzaev (Uzbek: Лазизбек Мирзаев; born 5 October 2006) is an Uzbek professional footballer who plays as a midfielder for Uzbekistan Super League club Lokomotiv Tashkent on loan from Gazalkent.

== Club career ==
Born in Tashkent, Mirzaev first took an interest in football at the age of seven, after watching Argentina international Lionel Messi play. After suffering a serious injury, he stepped away from the game to recover, before returning in 2019, when he joined the Odil Ahmedov Football Academy.

He joined then-Super League side Lokomotiv Tashkent for the 2022 season, and would go on to make his professional debut on 12 November, coming on as a late second-half substitute for Jerome Mpasko in a 3–1 win against Metallurg Bekabad. In January of the following year, he signed his first professional contract with the club, despite their relegation to the Pro League.

== International career ==
In 2021, Mirzaev represented Uzbekistan at both under-15 and under-16 level, scoring a brace for the latter in a 2–1 away win against the United Arab Emirates on 23 December. The following year he continued to represent the Uzbekistan under-16 team, scoring the only goal in a 1–0 friendly win over the under-18 squad of Pakhtakor, before captaining the side as they played at the Mirabror Usmanov Memorial Cup.

Later in 2022, Mirzaev scored a hat-trick against Brunei in a resounding 14–0 2023 AFC U-17 Asian Cup qualification win, before following this up with a free-kick equalising goal in an eventual 3–2 win over South Korea, helping Uzbekistan qualify for the 2023 AFC U-17 Asian Cup. At the competition proper, Mirzaev could not prevent Uzbekistan's defeat to South Korea in the semi-finals, stating "We have come a long way to this tournament. We played good matches. The most important thing is to qualify for the World Cup."

Ahead of the 2023 FIFA U-17 World Cup, Mirzaev was named by FIFA as one of the five Asian players to watch out for.

== Career statistics ==
=== Club ===
As of matches played 17 December 2024.

Appearances and goals by club, season and competition
Club	Season	League			Cup		Other		Total	
Club	Season	Division	Apps	Goals	Apps	Goals	Apps	Goals	Apps	Goals
Lokomotiv Tashkent	2022	Uzbekistan Super League	1	0	0	0	0	0	1	0
Lokomotiv Tashkent	2023	Uzbekistan Pro League	6	0	1 (Note: Appearances in the Uzbekistan Cup)	0	0	0	7	0
Lokomotiv Tashkent	2024	Uzbekistan Super League	14	0	2	0	0	0	16	0
Leganés	2024–25	La Liga	0	0	0	0	0	0	0	0
Career total			21	0	3	0	0	0	24	0

== Honours ==
Lokomotiv

- Uzbekistan Pro League: 2023
