= Mei Shuaijun =

Chinese footballer (born 2006)

Personal information
- Date of birth: 8 February 2006 (age 20)
- Place of birth: Zhoukou, Henan, China
- Position: Midfielder

Team information
- Current team: Shandong Taishan
- Number: 40

Youth career
- Shenzhen FA
- Shandong Taishan

Senior career*
Years	Team	Apps	(Gls)
2024–	Shandong Taishan B	57	(8)
2025–	Shandong Taishan	4	(0)

International career
2023	China U17	3	(0)
2024	China U19	2	(0)
- * Club domestic league appearances and goals as of 19 November 2026

Mei Shuaijun (Chinese: 梅帅军; born 8 February 2006) is a Chinese professional footballer who plays as a midfielder for Chinese Super League club Shandong Taishan.

== Early life ==
Born in Zhoukou in the Chinese province of Henan, Mei moved to Shenzhen as a child, and studied at the Yuanling Primary School.

== Club career ==
Having progressed through the academy of Shandong Taishan, Mei made his debut for the club's 'B' team in the China League Two in the 2024 season. He had a successful first season in professional football, being named young player of the month in June, having scored three goals in five appearances. His long-range strike against Shanxi Chongde Ronghai on 14 July 2024 took his tally for the season to four goals. On 12 October of the same year, he was handed a three-game suspension and fined 15,000 yuan for "engaged in unsportsmanlike conduct by using insulting gestures" during Shandong Taishan B's 1–0 loss to Shenzhen Juniors on 29 September.

Mei made his debut for Shandong Taishan's first team in the Chinese Super League on 19 April 2025, coming on as a second-half substitute for Li Yuanyi in a 6–1 loss to Beijing Guoan. In doing so, he became the first player born in 2006 to feature for the club. Having been officially promoted to the first team in July 2025, Mei's second appearance in Shandong Taishan's 3–0 win against Meizhou Hakka drew plaudits from Chinese media.

== International career ==
Mei was called up to the Chinese under-16 squad for a training camp in May 2021, while registered to the Shenzhen Football Association. Having scored once in qualification for the tournament, against the Northern Mariana Islands in an 11–0 win, Mei made three appearances at the 2023 AFC U-17 Asian Cup. He was called up to the under-19 side in March 2024 ahead of the Jakarta International Invitational Tournament, where he played in one of the two friendly matches against Indonesia.

== Style of play ==
Mei is often utilised as a defensive or attacking midfielder for Shandong Taishan's B team, though he is also capable of playing as a forward.

== Career statistics ==
As of 30 March 2026.

Appearances and goals by club, season and competition
Club	Season	League			Cup (Note: Includes Chinese FA Cup)		Continental		Other		Total	
Club	Season	Division	Apps	Goals	Apps	Goals	Apps	Goals	Apps	Goals	Apps	Goals
Shandong Taishan B	2024	China League Two	24	4	0	0	—		—		24	4
Shandong Taishan B	2025	China League Two	7	2	0	0	—		—		7	2
Shandong Taishan B	2026	China League Two	1	0	0	0	—		—		1	0
Shandong Taishan B	Total		32	6	0	0	0	0	0	0	32	6
Shandong Taishan	2025	Chinese Super League	4	0	1	0	—		—		5	0
Shandong Taishan	2026	Chinese Super League	0	0	0	0	—		—		0	0
Shandong Taishan	Total		4	0	1	0	0	0	0	0	5	0
Career total			36	6	1	0	0	0	0	0	37	6
