= Amin Abu Khalifa =

Jordanian footballer (born 2006)

Personal information
- Full name: Amin Husam Amin Abu Khalifa
- Date of birth: 5 February 2006 (age 20)
- Place of birth: Amman, Jordan
- Position: Right-back

Team information
- Current team: Al-Bukiryah (on loan from Al-Riyadh)
- Number: 12

Youth career
- –2024: Jordan Knights
- 2024–2025: Al-Riyadh
- 2025: Al-Shabab

Senior career*
Years	Team	Apps	(Gls)
2025–	Al-Riyadh	0	(0)
2025–	→Al-Bukiryah (loan)	0	(0)

International career^{‡}
2021	Jordan U-15		
2022	Jordan U-16		
2022–2023	Jordan U-17	4	(1)
2024–	Jordan U-20	3	(0)
- * Club domestic league appearances and goals as of 1 July 2025 ‡ National team caps and goals as of 29 September 2024

Amin Husam Amin Abu Khalifa (Arabic: أمين أبو خليفة; born 5 February 2006) is a Jordanian professional footballer who plays as a right-back for Saudi First Division League club Al-Bukiryah, on loan from Al-Riyadh.

== Club career ==
=== Early career ===
Born in Jordan, Abu Khalifa began his career at Jordan Knights, before signing with Al-Riyadh on a four-year contract. On 4 February 2025, he would join Al-Shabab's youth academy on a short loan.

=== Al-Riyadh ===
Upon returning from Al-Shabab's youth academy. Abu Khalifa joined the first team of Saudi Pro League club Al-Riyadh, participating in a training camp held in Spain.

== International career ==
On 26 November 2021, Abu Khalifa received his first call up with the Jordan U-15 national team for the 2021 WAFF U-15 Championship. Having an appearance at the tournament.

On 19 March 2022, Abu Khalifa joined the Jordan U-17's for a training camp in Antalya. He was a part of the winning team at the 2022 WAFF U-16 Championship. On 27 September 2022, Abu Khalifa was called up to the U-17 team for AFC qualifiers, scoring a goal against the Philippines.

On 11 January 2024, Abu Khalifa received his first call up with the Jordan U-20's for a training camp held in Antalya. He joined another camp in March, facing Syria and Japan. On 20 June 2024, Abu Khalifa was called up for the 2024 WAFF U-19 Championship. Abu Khalifa was called up with the team to participate in qualifiers.
