= Abdurrahman Iwan =

Qatari professional footballer (born 2006)

Personal information
- Full name: Abdurrahman Iwan Kuswanto
- Date of birth: 14 August 2006 (age 20)
- Place of birth: Doha, Qatar
- Position: Defender

Team information
- Current team: Al-Wakrah
- Number: 43

Youth career
- 2012–2015: Al-Wakrah
- 2015–2019: Aspire Academy
- 2019–: Al-Wakrah

Senior career*
Years	Team	Apps	(Gls)
2025–	Al-Wakrah	1	(0)
- * Club domestic league appearances and goals as of 18 August 2023

Abdurrahman Iwan Kuswanto (Arabic: وعبدالرحمن أوان; born 14 August 2006) is a Qatari professional footballer who plays as a defender for Qatar Stars League club Al-Wakrah.

== Early life ==
Iwan was born in Doha, to Indonesian parents from Kramatwatu in Serang who had moved to Qatar as his father worked for Qatar Petroleum.

== Club career ==
Having started to play football at the age of five, Iwan's father took him for trials with a number of professional clubs, including Al-Wakrah, albeit unsuccessfully due to his non-Qatari citizenship. Eventually he began training with Al-Wakrah three days a week, before joining officially in 2012. He joined the Aspire Academy in 2015.

== International career ==
Iwan is eligible to represent both Qatar and Indonesia at international level. In September 2022, he was called up to the Qatar under-17 side for the first time. He was a member of Qatar's squad for the 2023 AFC U-17 Asian Cup, but did not feature as Qatar were eliminated in the group stage.

In July 2023, it was reported that the Football Association of Indonesia (PSSI) had approached Iwan to play for Indonesia internationally, with the player posting on his Facebook account: "Thank God we arrived in our beloved homeland". When asked on social media by fans why he had initially chosen to represent Qatar ahead of Indonesia, he replied that the PSSI had not approached him with regard to representing Indonesia.

== Style of play ==
A forward in his early career, Iwan was a prolific goal-scorer, and earned comparisons to Argentine football legend Diego Maradona for his style of play.
