= Hakim Niazi =

Afghan footballer

Personal information
- Full name: Hakim Khan Niazi
- Date of birth: 14 August 2006 (age 20)
- Place of birth: Afghanistan
- Position: Attacking midfielder

Team information
- Current team: Attack Energy

Senior career*
Years	Team	Apps	(Gls)
2023–	Attack Energy		

International career^{‡}
2022–2023	Afghanistan U17	9	(5)
2023–	Afghanistan	2	(0)
- * Club domestic league appearances and goals as of 22:19, 19 September 2023 (UTC) ‡ National team caps and goals as of 18:12, 12 December 2024 (UTC)

Hakim Khan Niazi (born 14 August 2006) is an Afghan footballer who currently plays as an attacking midfielder for Afghan Premier League team Attack Energy and the Afghanistan national team.

== International career ==
Niazi represented Afghanistan in the 2022 CAFA U-16 Championship. He scored his team's only goal in a 1–1 draw with Kyrgyzstan in the team's opening match. He represented the country at the youth level again in 2023 AFC U-17 Asian Cup qualification. In the team's opening match, he scored three goals in the first half of an eventual 5–0 win over Mongolia. In the final tournament Niazi scored against Iran in the team's opening match of the Group Stage. He went on to assist on a goal by Habibullah Hotak in an eventual 2–1 victory over Qatar in both teams' final match of the Group Stage and tournament.

In July 2023 Niazi was called up to the Afghanistan national team by head coach Abdullah Al Mutairi for a training camp to determine the nation's squad for upcoming 2026 FIFA World Cup qualification and 2023 AFC Asian Cup qualification matches. He was then included in Afghanistan's squad for another training camp and a pair of friendlies against Bangladesh in September 2023. He made his debut on 3 September in the first of the two contests.

=== International career statistics ===
As of 3 September 2023

Afghanistan national team
Year	Apps	Goals
2023	1	0
2024	1	0
Total	2	0
