= Vi Đình Thượng =

Vietnamese footballer

Personal information
- Full name: Vi Đình Thượng
- Date of birth: 8 February 2006 (age 20)
- Place of birth: Quỳ Hợp, Nghệ An, Vietnam
- Height: 1.67 m (5 ft 6 in)
- Positions: Left-back; midfielder

Team information
- Current team: Huế
- Number: 37

Youth career
- 2019–2023: Huế

Senior career*
Years	Team	Apps	(Gls)
2023–	Huế	40	(3)

International career^{‡}
2022–2023	Vietnam U17	10	(1)
Medal record
Men's football
Representing Vietnam
AFF U-16 Youth Championship
Runner-up	Indonesia 2022
- * Club domestic league appearances and goals as of 13 June 2026 ‡ National team caps and goals as of 26 August 2023

Vi Đình Thượng (born 8 February 2006) is a Vietnamese professional footballer who plays as a left-back or midfielder for V.League 2 club Huế.

== Early career ==
Born in Nghệ An, Thượng participated in the entrance test of the Sông Lam Nghệ An youth academy in 2019 but failed to impress the club's coaches. He then went on a trial at Huế youth academy and was admitted.

Alongside football, Thượng also practiced running. In 2020, he won the mountain running competition of the Thừa Thiên Huế province.

== Club career ==
On 10 December 2023, Thượng made his professional debut in Huế's 2–1 V.League 2 win against Bà Rịa-Vũng Tàu.

== International career ==
He took part in the 2022 AFF U-16 Youth Championship, where Vietnam U16 finished as runner-up after losing to Indonesia in the final.

A year later, he was selected to participate in the 2023 AFC U-17 Asian Cup with Vietnam U17. He started in all three group stage games before Vietnam got eliminated.

== Personal life ==
Thượng comes from a family belonging to the Thái ethnic group.

== Career statistics ==
As of match played 13 June 2026

Appearances and goals by club, season and competition
Club	Season	League			Cup		Other		Total	
Club	Season	Division	Apps	Goals	Apps	Goals	Apps	Goals	Apps	Goals
Huế	2023–24	V.League 2	10	0	1	0	—		11	0
Huế	2024–25	V.League 2	19	2	0	0	—		19	2
Huế	2026	Second Division	11	1	—		1 (Note: Appearances in Second Division promotion play-offs)	0	12	1
Career total			40	3	1	0	1	0	42	3

== Honours ==
Vietnam U16

- AFF U-16 Youth Championship: Runner-up: 2022
