= Azizbek Tulkinbekov =

Uzbekistani association football player

Personal information
- Date of birth: 18 January 2007 (age 19)
- Place of birth: Tashkent, Uzbekistan
- Height: 1.81 m (5 ft 11 in)
- Position: Centre-back

Team information
- Current team: Bunyodkor
- Number: 66

Youth career
- Bunyodkor

Senior career*
Years	Team	Apps	(Gls)
2022–	Bunyodkor	24	(0)

International career
2022–2023	Uzbekistan U17	17	(0)
2024	Uzbekistan U20	10	(2)
2024–	Uzbekistan U21	2	(0)
- * Club domestic league appearances and goals as of 11 August 2025

Azizbek Tulkinbekov (Uzbek: Azizbek Toʻlqinbekov; born 18 January 2007) is an Uzbekistani professional footballer who plays as a centre-back for the Uzbekistan Super League club Bunyodkor.

== Club career ==
He made his senior and professional debut with Bunyodkor in a 2–0 Uzbekistan Super League win over FC Kokand 1912 on 7 November 2022 at the age of 15 years, 8 months, and 28 days. In doing so, he became the youngest ever debutant in the league. On 15 October 2024, he was named by English newspaper The Guardian as one of the best players born in 2007 worldwide.

== International career ==
Tulkinbekov is a youth international for Uzbekistan, having played for the Uzbekistan U17s at the 2023 AFC U-17 Asian Cup and the 2023 FIFA U-17 World Cup.
