= Alireza Homaeifard =

Iranian football player

Personal information
- Full name: Alireza Homaeifard
- Date of birth: 14 January 2006 (age 20)
- Place of birth: Hamadan, Iran
- Height: 1.86 m (6 ft 1 in)
- Position: Left-back

Team information
- Current team: Persepolis
- Number: 74

Senior career*
Years	Team	Apps	(Gls)
2024–2025	Paykan	0	(0)
2025–	Persepolis	1	(0)

International career
2023	Iran U17	9	(1)
2024–2025	Iran U20	3	(0)
- * Club domestic league appearances and goals as of 19 August 2026

Alireza Homaeifard (Persian: علیرضا همایی‌فرد; born 14 January 2006 in Hamadan) is an Iranian professional footballer who plays as a left-back for Persepolis. He has previously played for the youth teams of Paykan and represented Iran at the U-17 and U-20 levels.

== Club career ==
=== Paykan ===
Homaeifard began his football career in the youth ranks of Paykan. He played for the U-15 team from June 2019 to July 2021, before joining the U-17 team in October 2021. On 15 July 2022, Homaeifard signed a formal three-year contract with Paykan's senior team and played at the youth and senior levels of the club. He eventually transferred to Persepolis on an official contract in November 2024.

=== Persepolis ===
Homaeifard joined Persepolis from Paykan in 2024, with his contract registered until 30 June 2028.

Homaeifard joined Persepolis's senior squad for the 2026–27 season, He started in the second week of the Persian Gulf Pro League against Esteghlal Khuzestan, playing the full 90 minutes in a 4–1 victory for Persepolis. In that match, he played as a full-back and had a goalscoring opportunity late in the first half, which he missed.

== Career statistics ==
As of 19 August 2026

Club	Division	Season	League		Hazfi Cup		Asia		Other		Total	
Club	Division	Season	Apps	Goals	Apps	Goals	Apps	Goals	Apps	Goals	Apps	Goals
Persepolis	Persian Gulf Pro League	2026–27	1	0	0	0	–	–	–	–	1	0
Persepolis total			1	0	0	0	–	–	–	–	1	0

== International career ==
=== Iran U-17 ===
Homaeifard was a member of the Iran U-17 national team in 2023. He was included in Iran's squad for the AFC U-17 Asian Cup and the 2023 FIFA U-17 World Cup.

=== Iran U-20 ===
Homaeifard has also played for the Iran U-20 national team. He was included in Iran's official squad for the 2025 AFC U-20 Asian Cup.

In 2024, Homaeifard participated with the Iran national team in the CAFA U-20 Championship. Iran defeated Kyrgyzstan 3–0 in the final to win the tournament, with Homaeifard appearing in the final match.

== International statistics ==
National team	Year	Apps	Goals
Iran U-17	2023	9	1
Iran U-20	2024–2025	3	0

== Honours ==
=== International ===
- AFC U-17 Asian Cup:

Joint third place: 2023 Thailand Qualification for the 2023 FIFA U-17 World Cup

- FIFA U-17 World Cup:

Inclusion in Iran's final 21-man squad for the 2023 Indonesia World Cup under Hossein Abdi

- CAFA U-20 Championship: Winner (2024)
