= Kotaro Honda (footballer) =

Japanese footballer (born 2006)

Kotaro Honda 本多 康太郎
Personal information
- Date of birth: 20 May 2006 (age 20)
- Place of birth: Yokohama, Kanagawa, Japan
- Height: 1.88 m (6 ft 2 in)
- Position: Centre-back

Team information
- Current team: Shonan Bellmare
- Number: 24

Youth career
- 2014–2018: Mihosho SC
- 2019–: Shonan Bellmare

International career^{‡}
Years	Team	Apps	(Gls)
2021	Japan U15		
2022	Japan U16	3	(0)
2023	Japan U17	13	(0)
2025–	Japan U20	1	(0)
- ‡ National team caps and goals as of 12:47, 20 May 2025 (UTC)

Kotaro Honda (本多 康太郎, Honda Kōtarō; born 20 May 2006) is a Japanese footballer who plays as a centre-back for Shonan Bellmare.

== Club career ==
Born in Yokohama in the Kanagawa Prefecture of Japan, Honda began his career with Mihosho SC, joining in 2014. After joining the academy of professional club Shonan Bellmare in 2019, it was announced in April 2024 that he would be promoted to the first team the following year. He joined up with the club's first team permanently in January 2025, having already been involved in training and practice matches.

== International career ==
Between 2021 and 2023, Honda was called up to Japan's under-15, under-16 and under-17 sides. He was called up to the under-17 team for the 2023 FIFA U-17 World Cup alongside Bellmare teammate Keita Kosugi. In Japan's opening 1–0 win against Poland, Honda was critical of his own performance, despite Japan keeping a clean sheet, stating that the team had been tense and that he "definitely want[ed] to improve." He expressed his disappointment at Japan not being able to progress past the round of 16, saying that Japan had been "shown the difference" by Spain forward Marc Guiu, whose goal in Spain's 2–1 win knocked Japan out of the competition.

In May 2025 he was drafted into Japan's under-20 side to replace injured centre-back Rikuto Kuwahara.
