= Mohammad Hossein Sharifi =

Iranian footballer (born 2006)

Personal information
- Full name: Mohammad Hossein Sharifi Taskouh
- Date of birth: 10 June 2006 (age 20)
- Place of birth: Rasht, Iran
- Height: 1.89 m (6 ft 2 in)
- Position: Goalkeeper

Team information
- Current team: Esteghlal

Youth career
- 2020-2023: Esteghlal

Senior career*
Years	Team	Apps	(Gls)
2019–2022	Esteghlal	1	(0)

International career^{‡}
2023–	Iran U23	0	(0)
- * Club domestic league appearances and goals as of 24 May 2021 ‡ National team caps and goals as of 24 December 2021

Mohammad Hossein Sharifi (Persian: محمد حسین شریفی; born 10 June 2006) is an Iranian footballer who plays for Esteghlal in the Persian Gulf Pro League.
