= Mohammad Askari =

Iranian football player (born 2006)

Mir Mohammad Askari
Personal information
- Date of birth: 7 February 2006 (age 20)
- Place of birth: Behbahan, Iran
- Height: 1.85 m (6 ft 1 in)
- Position: Winger

Team information
- Current team: Sepahan
- Number: 17

Youth career
- 2012–2014: Behbahan National Football School
- 2015–2018: Ramshir Noonhalan
- 2018–2020: Hafari Ahvaz
- 2021–2023: Esteghlal Khuzestan

Senior career*
| Years | Team | Apps | (Gls) |
| 2023–2025 | Foolad | 42 | (3) |
| 2025– | Sepahan | 10 | (3) |

International career^{‡}
| 2022–2023 | Iran U17 | 17 | (5) |
| 2024– | Iran U20 | 3 | (0) |
- * Club domestic league appearances and goals as of 1 May 2025 ‡ National team caps and goals as of 12 July 2024

Mohammad Askari (Persian: محمد عسکری; born 7 February 2006) is an Iranian football winger who plays for the Iranian football club Sepahan in the Persian Gulf Pro League.

== Early career ==
In 2012, Askari started his football career in Behbahan national football school. In 2015, he participated in Ramshir Noonhalan national team, and from 2018 to 2020, he was in the Hafari youth team in the country's premier league. In 2021, he participated in the youth team of Esteghlal Khuzestan.

== International career ==
He has played 27 games for the Iran youth national teams., scoring 37 goals and 8 assists. He took part in a junior tournament and four friendlies with the Iranian youth national teams.

In 2023 he participated in the 2023 AFC U-17 Asian Cup with Iran U17. The team reached the semi-finals and qualified for 2023 FIFA U-17 World Cup.

== Personal life ==
On 16 January 2026, just before their match against South Korea in the 2026 AFC U-23 Asian Cup, Askari, along with his entire team, refused to sing "Mehr-e Khavaran", the national anthem of the Islamic Republic of Iran, in solidarity with the 2025–2026 Iranian protests.

== Honours ==
=== International ===
Iran U16

- CAFA U-16 Championship: 2022
