= Lê Đình Long Vũ =

Vietnamese footballer (born 2006)

Personal information
- Full name: Lê Đình Long Vũ
- Date of birth: 27 May 2006 (age 20)
- Place of birth: Thạch Hà, Hà Tĩnh, Vietnam
- Height: 1.72 m (5 ft 8 in)
- Position: Winger

Team information
- Current team: Sông Lam Nghệ An
- Number: 38

Youth career
- 2016–2017: PTF Hà Tĩnh
- 2017–2024: Sông Lam Nghệ An

Senior career*
Years	Team	Apps	(Gls)
2024–	Sông Lam Nghệ An	57	(1)

International career^{‡}
2022–2023	Vietnam U17	11	(5)
2024–2025	Vietnam U20	11	(1)
2023–	Vietnam U23	13	(0)
Medal record
Men's football
Representing Vietnam
AFF U-16 Youth Championship
Runner-up	Indonesia 2022
AFF U-23 Championship
Winner	Thailand 2023
- * Club domestic league appearances and goals as of 20 November 2026 ‡ National team caps and goals as of 14 November 2026

Lê Đình Long Vũ (born 27 May 2006) is a Vietnamese professional footballer who plays as a winger for V.League 1 side Sông Lam Nghệ An and the Vietnam national under-23 team.

In 2023, Long Vũ was listed by The Guardian as one of the 60 best young football talents in the world.

== Early career ==
Born in Hà Tĩnh, Long Vũ started playing football at an early age and regularly participated in youth tournaments organized in his province. After displaying good skills and techniques during a U11 tournament in 2017, Long Vũ received offers to sign Sông Lam Nghệ An and Hà Tĩnh. He chose Sông Lam Nghệ An considering the team will be better for his development.

In 2023, Long Vũ was promoted to the U19 team of Sông Lam Nghệ An despite being only 17 years old. He gained a starter spot and helped his team reach the final of the Vietnamese National U-19 Football Championship, where they lost against Thanh Hóa U19. Nevertheless, his performances during the tournament granted him the spot in the "Best XI". On 11 October 2023, he was named by English newspaper The Guardian as one of the best players born in 2006 worldwide.

== Club career ==
In March 2024, Long Vũ was promoted to Sông Lam Nghệ An senior squad for the second part of the 2023–24 season. He made his team debut on 13 March 2024, starting in the 0–1 Vietnamese Cup defeat against SHB Đà Nẵng.

== International career ==
In March 2022, Long Vũ was one of the four 2006 born players to be selected in Vietnam U17 squad for a training camp in Germany, where they played friendlies against youth teams of German professional clubs. Later in the year, Long Vũ was called up to Vietnam national under-16 team for the AFF U-16 Youth Championship. He scored one goal during the tournament as Vietnam reached the final game, where they were defeated by Indonesia.

In June 2023, Long Vũ took part in the 2023 AFC U-17 Asian Cup with Vietnam U17. He started in all three group stage games and scored Vietnam's only goal during the tournament from a long range shot against India.

Two months later, in August 2023, he featured in the Vietnam U23 squad for the 2023 AFF U-23 Championship as the youngest player in the team. He made his U-23 debut on 24 August 2023 in Vietnam's 1–0 victory against Philippines U23. Vietnam U23 later successfully won the tournament, with Long Vũ featuring in the final game against Indonesia U23 as he entered the field at the beginning of extra time to replace Nguyễn Quốc Việt.

== Playing style ==
As a winger who is capable of using both feet, Long Vũ can play well on either flank. He also has a good ability to create scoring chance and cross the ball accurately. In addition, Long Vũ is also known great quality in terms of his shooting ability from outside the box. His persistence, efficiency and exceptional dribbling skills made him one of the most talented Vietnamese players in his generation. In 2023, John Duerden of The Guardian described him as a player with "pace, slight build, dribbling and ability to whip balls into the area", and compared his playing style with Phil Foden.

== Career statistics ==
As of match played 20 November 2026

Appearances and goals by club, season and competition
Club	Season	League			Cup		Continental		Other		Total	
Club	Season	Division	Apps	Goals	Apps	Goals	Apps	Goals	Apps	Goals	Apps	Goals
Sông Lam Nghệ An	2023–24	V.League 1	12	0	1	0	—		—		13	0
Sông Lam Nghệ An	2024–25	V.League 1	21	0	2	0	—		—		23	0
Sông Lam Nghệ An	2025–26	V.League 1	21	1	1	0	—		—		22	1
Sông Lam Nghệ An	2026–27	V.League 1	3	0	1	0	—		—		4	0
Career total			57	1	5	0	0	0	0	0	62	1

== Honours ==
Vietnam U16

- AFF U-16 Championship runner-up: 2022

Vietnam U23

- AFF U-23 Championship: 2023
- Gia Lai U-23 VTV Cup: 2026
