= Kang Min-woo (footballer, born 2006) =

South Korean footballer (born 2006)

Personal information
- Date of birth: 2 March 2006 (age 20)
- Place of birth: Ulsan, South Korea
- Height: 1.85 m (6 ft 1 in)
- Position: Defender

Team information
- Current team: Kataller Toyama
- Number: 27

Youth career
- –2024: Ulsan HD FC

Senior career*
Years	Team	Apps	(Gls)
2024–	Ulsan HD FC	11	(0)
2025–2026	→ Jong Genk (loan)	7	(0)
2026–	→ Kataller Toyama (loan)	1	(1)

International career^{‡}
2022	South Korea U16	5	(1)
2023	South Korea U17	16	(1)
2024	South Korea U19	2	(0)
2024–	South Korea U20	4	(0)
- * Club domestic league appearances and goals as of 16 August 2026 ‡ National team caps and goals as of 10 June 2025

Kang Min-woo (Korean: 강민우; born 2 March 2006) is a South Korean footballer who plays as a defender for Japanese side Kataller Toyama on loan from Ulsan HD FC.

== Club career ==
As a youth player, Kang joined the youth academy of South Korean side Ulsan HD FC and was promoted to the club's senior team in 2024, helping the club win the league title. Subsequently, he was sent on loan to Belgian side Jong Genk in 2025.

== International career ==
Kang is a South Korea youth international. During the summer of 2023, he played for the South Korea national under-17 football team at the 2023 AFC U-17 Asian Cup.

== Style of play ==
Kang plays as a defender. South Korean news website Nate wrote in 2024 that "his quick feet, aggressive defense, aerial prowess, and build-up prowess solidified the defense".
