= Tahsin Jamshid =

Qatari footballer (born 2006)

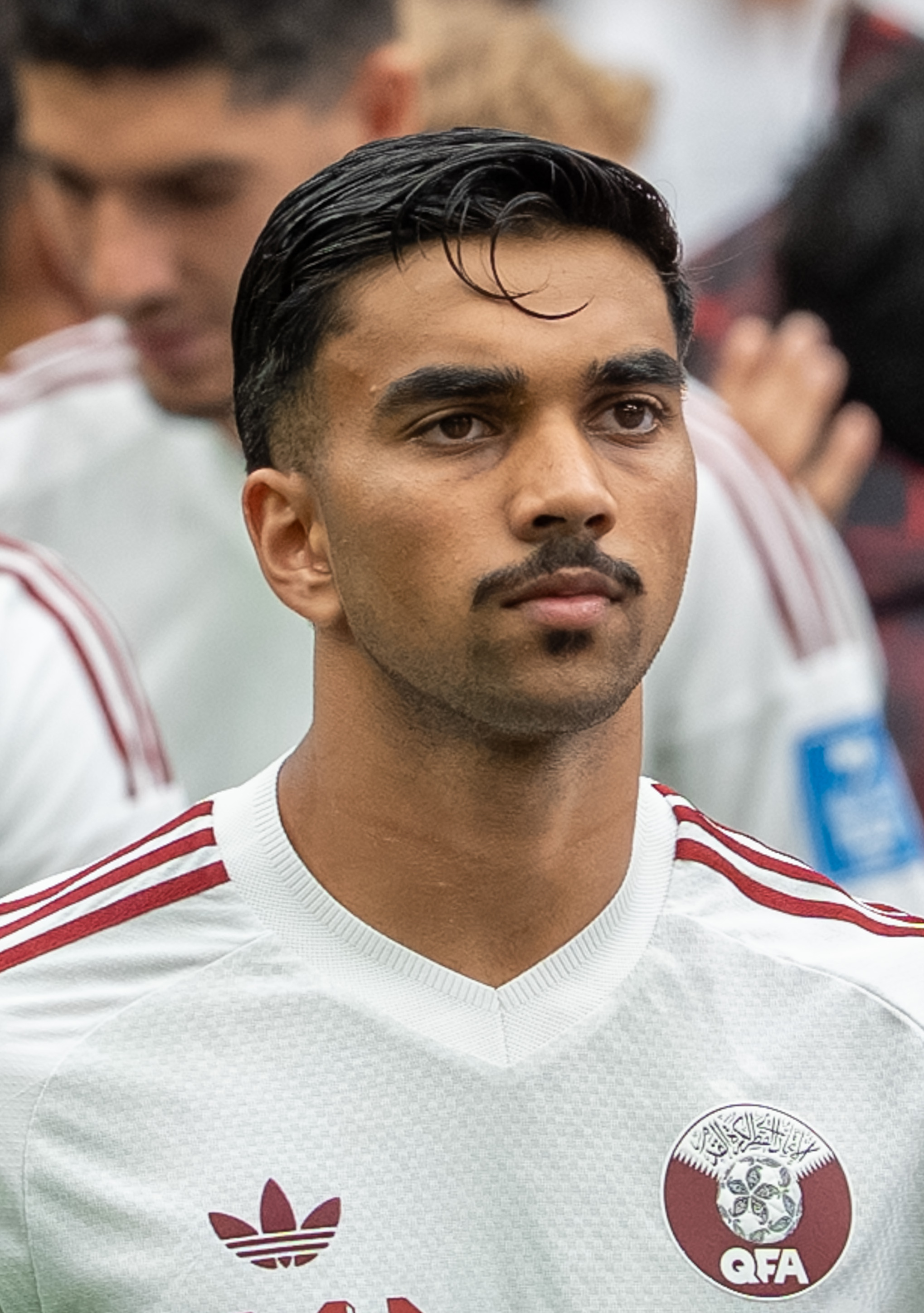
- Tahsin with Qatar in 2026

Personal information
- Full name: Tahsin Mohammed Jamshid
- Date of birth: 16 June 2006 (age 20)
- Place of birth: Doha, Qatar
- Height: 1.66 m (5 ft 5 in)
- Position: Winger

Team information
- Current team: Al-Duhail
- Number: 81

Youth career
- Al-Duhail

Senior career*
Years	Team	Apps	(Gls)
2024–	Al-Duhail	4	(1)
2024–2025	→ Alcorcón B (loan)	0	(0)

International career^{‡}
2021	Qatar U16	2	(1)
2022	Qatar U18	3	(0)
2024–	Qatar	3	(0)
- * Club domestic league appearances and goals as of 28 April 2024 ‡ National team caps and goals as of 6 June 2024

Tahsin Mohammed Jamshid (born 16 June 2006) is a Qatari professional footballer who plays as a winger for Qatar Stars League club Al-Duhail and the Qatar national team.

== Early life ==
Tahsin was born on 16 June 2006 in Qatar to Indian Malayali parents from Kerala. He got into football under his father's guidance, who was a former University of Calicut footballer. Tahsin's father Jamshid hails from Thalassery and mother Shyma hails from Valapattanam. His father works as an accountant in Qatar. Tahsin trained at the Aspire Football Academy in Qatar and became the first Indian player in the Gulf nation.

== Club career ==
Tahsin started playing football in the Qatar Stars League. He made his senior debut for Al Duhail on 31 March 2024 against Al Rayyan, he plays as a left winger, has trained at the Aspire Football Academy in Qatar and has featured in various age group squads in Qatar. He was part of the Qatari U-16, U-17 and Qatar U-17 football teams. He made his debut for Al Duhail in the Qatar Stars League, the country's first league, becoming the first Indian footballer to play in it.

== International career ==
Tahsin was named to the Qatar national team for FIFA World Cup qualifier matches against Afghanistan and India on 6 and 11 June.

He was later selected for the Qatar national team squad for the 2026 FIFA World Cup. With this selection, Tahsin became the first Indian passport-holder to play in the World Cup.

== Career statistics ==
=== Club ===
As of June 2026

Club	Season	League †			Cup ‡			International *			Total		
Club	Season	Apps	Goals	Assists	Apps	Goals	Assists	Apps	Goals	Assists	Apps	Goals	Assists
Al-Duhail SC (U-17)	Qatar Stars League 2022	26	1	4	0	0	0	-	-	-	26	1	4
Al-Duhail SC (U-19)	Qatar Stars League 2024	4	0	0	0	0	0	-	-	-	4	0	0
Career total		30	1	4	0	0	0	0	1	0	30	2	4
