= 2023 AFC U-17 Asian Cup =

ฟุตบอลชิงแชมป์เอเชีย รุ่นอายุไม่เกิน 17 ปี 2023

Tournament details
- Host country: Thailand
- Dates: 15 June – 2 July
- Teams: 16 (from 1 confederation)
- Venues: 4 (in 3 host cities)

Final positions
- Champions: Japan (4th title)
- Runners-up: South Korea

Tournament statistics
- Matches played: 31
- Goals scored: 99 (3.19 per match)
- Attendance: 17,586 (567 per match)
- Top scorer(s): (Japan) Gaku Nawata (5 goals)
- Best player: (Japan) Gaku Nawata
- Best goalkeeper: (Japan) Wataru Goto
- Fair play award: Japan

The 2023 AFC U-17 Asian Cup was the 19th edition of the AFC U-17 Asian Cup (including previous editions of the AFC U-16 Championship and AFC U-17 Championship), the biennial international youth football championship organised by the Asian Football Confederation (AFC) for the men's under-17 national teams of Asia. This edition was the first since 2006 to be played as an under-17 tournament, as the AFC proposed to switch the tournament from under-16 to under-17 starting from 2023. Moreover, the tournament was also rebranded from the "AFC U-16 Championship" to the "AFC U-17 Asian Cup".

On 25 January 2021, the AFC announced that Bahrain would retain hosting rights for the 2023 edition after the cancellation of the 2020 AFC U-16 Championship due to the COVID-19 pandemic. However, Bahrain decided to withdraw the rights to host the competition on 16 June 2022, requiring a new host to be chosen at a later date. On 23 December 2022, Thailand were chosen to host the tournament by the AFC Executive Committee.

A total of 16 teams played in the tournament. The top four teams of the tournament qualified for the 2023 FIFA U-17 World Cup initially played in Peru, which moved to Indonesia prior to the final as the AFC representatives besides Indonesia who qualified automatically as the new host.

Japan were the title holders, having won the title in 2018, and managed to defend their title.

== Qualification ==
Qualification matches were played between 1–9 October 2022.

=== Qualified teams ===
A total of 16 teams including hosts qualified for the final tournament. Bahrain, Indonesia, Oman, United Arab Emirates and North Korea (the latter of which did not enter qualifying) all missed out on this edition after initially qualifying for the previous edition. Furthermore, Afghanistan, Laos, Malaysia, Thailand and Vietnam all qualified for this edition after initially missing out.

Team	Qualified as	Appearance	Previous best performance
Japan	Group A winners	16th	Champions (1994, 2006, 2018)
Malaysia	Group B winners	6th	Quarter-finals (2014)
Qatar	Group C winners	11th	Champions (1990)
Saudi Arabia	Group D winners	11th	Champions (1985, 1988)
Yemen	Group E winners	7th	Runners-up (2002)
Vietnam	Group F winners	8th	Fourth place (2000)
Australia	Group G winners	7th	Semi-finals (2010, 2014, 2018)
Tajikistan	Group H winners	4th	Runners-up (2018)
Iran	Group I winners	12th	Champions (2008)
Uzbekistan	Group J winners	10th	Champions (2012)
South Korea	Best runners-up	15th	Champions (1986, 2002)
China	2nd best runners-up	15th	Champions (1992, 2004)
Afghanistan	3rd best runners-up	2nd	Group stage (2018)
India	4th best runners-up	9th	Quarter-finals (2002, 2018)
Thailand	5th best runners-up and hosts	12th	Champions (1998)
Laos	6th best runners-up	3rd	Group stage (2004, 2012)

== Venues ==
The competition was played in four venues across three cities/provinces.

Bangkok	2023 AFC U-17 Asian Cup is located in Thailand	Pathum Thani
Rajamangala Stadium	2023 AFC U-17 Asian Cup is located in Thailand	Pathum Thani Stadium
Capacity: 51,552	2023 AFC U-17 Asian Cup is located in Thailand	Capacity: 10,114
Pathum Thani	2023 AFC U-17 Asian Cup is located in Thailand	Chonburi
Thammasat Stadium	2023 AFC U-17 Asian Cup is located in Thailand	Chonburi Stadium
Capacity: 25,000	2023 AFC U-17 Asian Cup is located in Thailand	Capacity: 8,680

== Match officials ==
Referees

- (China) Shen Yinhao (†)
- (Indonesia) Thoriq Alkatiri
- (India) Pranjal Banerjee
- (Iran) Payam Heidari
- (Jordan) Ahmed Al-Ali (†)
- (Lebanon) Ali Reda (†)
- (Oman) Omar Al-Yaqoubi
- (South Korea) Kim Jong-hyeok (†)
- (Tajikistan) Nasrullo Kabirov
- (Thailand) Mongkolchai Pechsri
- (United Arab Emirates) Ahmed Eisa Darwish (†)
- (Uzbekistan) Rustam Lutfullin (†)

Assistant referees

- (Bahrain) Saleh Janahi
- (Bangladesh) Mohammed Manir Dhali
- (China) Zhang Cheng
- (Indonesia) Nurhadi Sulchan
- (Iran) Arman Assadi
- (Iraq) Ahmed Al-Baghdadi
- (Jordan) Ayman Obeidat
- (Kyrgyzstan) Ismailzhan Talipzhanov
- (Oman) Hamed Al-Ghafri
- (South Korea) Park Kyun-yong
- (Syria) Omar Al-Jamal
- (Syria) Fadi Mahmoud
- (Tajikistan) Akmal Buriev
- (Thailand) Pattarapong Kijsathit
- (United Arab Emirates) Jasem Al-Ali
- (Uzbekistan) Alisher Usmanov

(†): working as both referee and assistant referee.

== Draw ==
The 16 teams were drawn into four groups of four teams, with the teams seeded according to their performance in the 2018 AFC U-16 Championship final tournament and qualification, with the hosts Thailand automatically seeded and assigned to Position A1 in the draw. The draw took place and the match schedule was confirmed on 30 March 2023 in Bangkok, Thailand.

Pot 1	Pot 2	Pot 3	Pot 4
1. Thailand (H); 2. Japan; 3. Tajikistan; 4. South Korea	5. Australia; 6. India; 7. Iran; 8. Yemen	9. Malaysia; 10. Vietnam; 11. Afghanistan; 12. Saudi Arabia	13. China; 14. Uzbekistan; 15. Qatar; 16. Laos

== Squads ==
Players born between 1 January 2006 and 31 December 2008 were eligible to compete in the tournament. Each team should register a squad of minimum 18 players and maximum 23 players, minimum three of whom must be goalkeepers.

== Group stage ==
The group winners and runners-up advance to the quarter-finals.

Tiebreakers

Teams are to be ranked according to points (3 points for a win, 1 point for a draw, 0 points for a loss), and if tied on points, the following tie-breaking criteria were applied, in the order given, to determine the rankings:

1. Points in head-to-head matches among tied teams;
2. Goal difference in head-to-head matches among tied teams;
3. Goals scored in head-to-head matches among tied teams;
4. If more than two teams are tied, and after applying all head-to-head criteria above, a subset of teams are still tied, all head-to-head criteria above are reapplied exclusively to this subset of teams;
5. Goal difference in all group matches;
6. Goals scored in all group matches;
7. Penalty shoot-out if only two teams were tied and they met in the last round of the group;
8. Disciplinary points (yellow card = 1 point, red card as a result of two yellow cards = 3 points, direct red card = 3 points, yellow card followed by direct red card = 4 points);
9. Drawing of lots.

All match times are in local time, ICT (UTC+7).

=== Group A ===
Pos	Team	Pld	W	D	L	GF	GA	GD	Pts	Qualification
1	Thailand (H)	3	3	0	0	6	1	+5	9	Knockout stage
2	Yemen	3	2	0	1	6	2	+4	6	Knockout stage
3	Malaysia	3	1	0	2	2	8	−6	3	
4	Laos	3	0	0	3	3	6	−3	0	

Source: AFC
Rules for classification: Group stage tiebreakers
(H) Hosts
15 June 2023
17:00

Yemen	4–0	Malaysia
Al Khader 21'; Abbas 31'; Al Turaiqi 48' (pen.); Adib 88' (o.g.)	Report

Thammasat Stadium, Pathum Thani
Attendance: 129
Referee: Payam Heidari (Iran)
15 June 2023
19:00

Thailand	2–1	Laos
Dutsadee 12'; Chanothai 90+5'	Report	Phanthavong 26'

Pathum Thani Stadium, Pathum Thani
Attendance: 1,135
Referee: Kim Jong-hyeok (South Korea)

18 June 2023
17:00

Laos	1–2	Yemen
Phousomboun 55'	Report	Abbas 28'; Al Turaiqi 75' (pen.)

Thammasat Stadium, Pathum Thani
Attendance: 122
Referee: Rustam Lutfullin (Uzbekistan)
18 June 2023
19:00

Malaysia	0–3	Thailand
	Report	Pacharaphol 45+2'; Chanasorn 54'; Chanothai 78'

Pathum Thani Stadium, Pathum Thani
Attendance: 1,515
Referee: Ahmed Al-Ali (Jordan)

21 June 2023
19:00

Thailand	1–0	Yemen
Tanakrit 90+6'	Report

Pathum Thani Stadium, Pathum Thani
Attendance: 1,370
Referee: Banerjee Pranjal (India)
21 June 2023
19:00

Malaysia	2–1	Laos
Dainei 43', 78'	Report	Sayfon 12'

Thammasat Stadium, Pathum Thani
Attendance: 135
Referee: Nasrullo Kabirov (Tajikistan)

=== Group B ===
Pos	Team	Pld	W	D	L	GF	GA	GD	Pts	Qualification
1	Iran	3	2	1	0	8	1	+7	7	Knockout stage
2	South Korea	3	2	0	1	10	3	+7	6	Knockout stage
3	Afghanistan	3	1	0	2	3	11	−8	3	
4	Qatar	3	0	1	2	2	8	−6	1	

Source: AFC
Rules for classification: Group stage tiebreakers
16 June 2023
19:00

South Korea	6–1	Qatar
Kim Myung-jun 12' (pen.), 46', 60'; Baek In-woo 20', 55'; Yoon Do-young 31'	Report	Babiker 15'

Pathum Thani Stadium, Pathum Thani
Attendance: 111
Referee: Shen Yinhao (China)
16 June 2023
21:00

Iran	6–1	Afghanistan
Nafari 28'; Gholizadeh 32' (pen.), 51'; Taheri 45+4', 48'; Ghandipour 89'	Report	Niazi 36'

Rajamangala Stadium, Bangkok
Attendance: 73
Referee: Ali Reda (Lebanon)

19 June 2023
19:00

Afghanistan	0–4	South Korea
	Report	Lim Hyun-sub 13'; Noorzai 24' (o.g.); Yoon Do-young 34', 54'

Pathum Thani Stadium, Pathum Thani
Attendance: 170
Referee: Thoriq Alkatiri (Indonesia)
19 June 2023
21:00

Qatar	0–0	Iran
	Report

Rajamangala Stadium, Bangkok
Attendance: 83
Referee: Omar Al-Yaqoubi (Oman)

22 June 2023
21:00

South Korea	0–2	Iran
	Report	Andarz 18'; Sadeghi 19'

Pathum Thani Stadium, Pathum Thani
Attendance: 264
Referee: Ahmed Al-Ali (Jordan)
22 June 2023
21:00

Afghanistan	2–1	Qatar
Hotak 18', 40'	Report	Al-Shaaibi 26'

Rajamangala Stadium, Bangkok
Attendance: 78
Referee: Ali Reda (Lebanon)

=== Group C ===
Pos	Team	Pld	W	D	L	GF	GA	GD	Pts	Qualification
1	Saudi Arabia	3	3	0	0	7	0	+7	9	Knockout stage
2	Australia	3	2	0	1	7	5	+2	6	Knockout stage
3	Tajikistan	3	0	1	2	1	5	−4	1	
4	China	3	0	1	2	4	9	−5	1	

Source: AFC
Rules for classification: Group stage tiebreakers
16 June 2023
17:00

Australia	0–2	Saudi Arabia
	Report	Al-Bishri 56'; Al-Jaadani 86'

Chonburi Stadium, Chonburi
Attendance: 95
Referee: Omar Al-Yaqoubi (Oman)
16 June 2023
21:00

Tajikistan	1–1	China
Gafurov 36'	Report	Wang Yudong 6'

Chonburi Stadium, Chonburi
Attendance: 373
Referee: Pranjal Banerjee (India)

19 June 2023
17:00

China	3–5	Australia
Wang Yudong 14', 62'; Kuai Jiwen 45+7'	Report	Irankunda 9', 18'; De Abreu 12'; Glasson 25'; Amanatidis 90+8'

Chonburi Stadium, Chonburi
Attendance: 215
Referee: Ahmed Eisa Darwish (United Arab Emirates)
19 June 2023
21:00

Saudi Arabia	2–0	Tajikistan
Haji 63', 90'	Report

Chonburi Stadium, Chonburi
Attendance: 72
Referee: Kim Jong-hyeok (South Korea)

22 June 2023
17:00

Tajikistan	0–2	Australia
	Report	Bennie 68'; Amanatidis 90+9'

Rajamangala Stadium, Bangkok
Attendance: 128
Referee: Thoriq Alkatiri (Indonesia)
22 June 2023
17:00

Saudi Arabia	3–0	China
Al-Muwallad 45'; Al-Bishri 79'; Al-Yahebi 90+2'	Report

Chonburi Stadium, Chonburi
Attendance: 233
Referee: Mongkolchai Pechsri (Thailand)

=== Group D ===
Pos	Team	Pld	W	D	L	GF	GA	GD	Pts	Qualification
1	Japan	3	2	1	0	13	5	+8	7	Knockout stage
2	Uzbekistan	3	2	1	0	3	1	+2	7	Knockout stage
3	India	3	0	1	2	5	10	−5	1	
4	Vietnam	3	0	1	2	1	6	−5	1	

Source: AFC
Rules for classification: Group stage tiebreakers
17 June 2023
17:00

Japan	1–1	Uzbekistan
Michiwaki 8'	Report	Saidov 83'

Rajamangala Stadium, Bangkok
Attendance: 421
Referee: Mongkolchai Pechsri (Thailand)
17 June 2023
19:00

India	1–1	Vietnam
Malemngamba 69'	Report	Lê Đình Long Vũ 44'

Thammasat Stadium, Pathum Thani
Attendance: 108
Referee: Nasrullo Kabirov (Tajikistan)

20 June 2023
17:00

Vietnam	0–4	Japan
	Report	Michiwaki 2'; Mochizuki 59', 74'; Sato 66'

Rajamangala Stadium, Bangkok
Attendance: 294
Referee: Ali Reda (Lebanon)
20 June 2023
19:00

Uzbekistan	1–0	India
Reimov 81'	Report

Thammasat Stadium, Pathum Thani
Attendance: 98
Referee: Shen Yinhao (China)

23 June 2023
19:00

Japan	8–4	India
Kawamura 13'; Nawata 41', 45'; Nagano 52'; Mochizuki 54'; Nakajima 74'; Yamaguchi 90+6'; Sugiura 90+8'	Report	Mukul 47'; Meitei 62'; Miyagawa 69' (o.g.); Korou 79'

Rajamangala Stadium, Bangkok
Attendance: 274
Referee: Nasrullo Kabirov (Tajikistan)
23 June 2023
19:00

Vietnam	0–1	Uzbekistan
	Report	Shodiboev 25'

Thammasat Stadium, Pathum Thani
Attendance: 149
Referee: Kim Jong-hyeok (South Korea)

== Knockout stage ==
The schedule for the knockout stage was released in 2023. The top 4 teams in the knockout stage will qualify for the 2023 FIFA U-17 World Cup as AFC representatives.

=== Bracket ===
Quarter-finals
25 June – Pathum Thani
Thailand	1
South Korea	4
26 June – Thammasat
Saudi Arabia	0
Uzbekistan	2
25 June – Thammasat
Iran (p)	0 (4)
Yemen	0 (2)
26 June – Pathum Thani
Japan	3
Australia	1

Semi-finals
29 June – Pathum Thani
South Korea	1
Uzbekistan	0
29 June – Thammasat
Iran	0
Japan	3

Final
2 July – Pathum Thani
South Korea	0
Japan	3

=== Quarter-finals ===
Winners were qualified for the 2023 FIFA U-17 World Cup.

25 June 2023
17:00

Iran	0–0	Yemen
	Report
Penalties
Aali (penalty scored); Nafari (penalty scored); Gholizadeh (penalty scored); Askari (penalty missed); Andarz (penalty scored)	4–2	(penalty scored) Al Turaiqi; (penalty missed) Al Salami; (penalty scored) Radman; (penalty missed) Al Khadher

Thammasat Stadium, Pathum Thani
Attendance: 20
Referee: Kim Jong-hyeok (South Korea)

25 June 2023
21:00

Thailand	1–4	South Korea
Dutsadee 16'	Report	Kang Min-woo 4'; Kim Myung-jun 36'; Yoon Do-young 69'; Kim Hyun-min 84'

Pathum Thani Stadium, Pathum Thani
Attendance: 5,840
Referee: Shen Yinhao (China)

26 June 2023
17:00

Japan	3–1	Australia
Nawata 10'; Michiwaki 23'; Takaoka 74'	Report	Irankunda 62'

Pathum Thani Stadium, Pathum Thani
Attendance: 457
Referee: Mongkolchai Pechsri (Thailand)

26 June 2023
21:00

Saudi Arabia	0–2	Uzbekistan
	Report	Al-Burayah 79' (o.g.); Abdullaev 84'

Thammasat Stadium, Pathum Thani
Attendance: 170
Referee: Ahmed Al-Ali (Jordan)

=== Semi-finals ===
29 June 2023
17:00

Iran	0–3	Japan
	Report	Yada 10'; Mochizuki 25'; Sato 74'

Thammasat Stadium, Pathum Thani
Attendance: 298
Referee: Nasrullo Kabirov (Tajikistan)

29 June 2023
21:00

South Korea	1–0	Uzbekistan
Baek In-woo 31'	Report

Pathum Thani Stadium, Pathum Thani
Attendance: 496
Referee: Banerjee Pranjal (India)

=== Final ===
2 July 2023
19:00

South Korea	0–3	Japan
	Report	Nawata 45+1', 66'; Michiwaki 90+6'

Pathum Thani Stadium, Pathum Thani
Attendance: 2,660
Referee: Mongkolchai Pechsri (Thailand)

== Winners ==
2023 AFC U-17 Asian Cup winners

Japan
Fourth title

== Awards ==
The following awards were given at the conclusion of the tournament:

Top Goalscorer	Most Valuable Player	Best Goalkeeper	Fair Play award
(Japan) Gaku Nawata	(Japan) Gaku Nawata	(Japan) Wataru Goto	Japan

== Goalscorers ==
There were 99 goals scored in 31 matches, for an average of 3.19 goals per match.

5 goals

- (Japan) Gaku Nawata

4 goals

- (Japan) Kohei Mochizuki
- (Japan) Yutaka Michiwaki
- (South Korea) Kim Myung-jun
- (South Korea) Yun Do-young

3 goals

- (Australia) Nestory Irankunda
- (China) Wang Yudong
- (South Korea) Baek In-woo

2 goals

- (Afghanistan) Habibullah Hotak
- (Australia) Nathan Amanatidis
- (Iran) Esmaeil Gholizadeh
- (Iran) Kasra Taheri
- (Japan) Ryunosuke Sato
- (Malaysia) Dainei Disa
- (Saudi Arabia) Nawaf Al-Bishri
- (Saudi Arabia) Talal Haji
- (Thailand) Dutsadee Buranajutanon
- (Thailand) Chanothai Kongmeng
- (Yemen) Adel Abbas
- (Yemen) Anwar Al Turaiqi

1 goal

- (Afghanistan) Hakim Niazi
- (Australia) Daniel Bennie
- (Australia) Giovanni De Abreu
- (Australia) Mitchell Glasson
- (China) Kuai Jiwen
- (India) Danny Metei
- (India) Mukul Panwar
- (India) Korou Singh
- (India) Malemngamba Singh
- (Iran) Nima Andarz
- (Iran) Reza Ghandipour
- (Iran) Hesam Nafari
- (Iran) Mahan Sadeghi
- (Japan) Gakuto Kawamura
- (Japan) Shuto Nagano
- (Japan) Yotaro Nakajima
- (Japan) Shungo Sugiura
- (Japan) Rento Takaoka
- (Japan) Ryonusuke Yada
- (Japan) Gota Yamaguchi
- (Laos) Sayfon Keohanam
- (Laos) Phousomboun Panyavong
- (Laos) Peter Phanthavong
- (Qatar) Khalid Al-Shaaibi
- (Qatar) Nasser Babiker
- (Saudi Arabia) Nawaf Al-Jaadani
- (Saudi Arabia) Mohammed Al-Muwallad
- (Saudi Arabia) Ammar Al-Yahebi
- (South Korea) Kang Min-woo
- (South Korea) Kim Hyun-min
- (South Korea) Lim Hyun-sub
- (Tajikistan) Masrur Gafurov
- (Thailand) Chanasorn Choklap
- (Thailand) Pacharaphol Lekkun
- (Thailand) Tanakrit Lomnak
- (Uzbekistan) Dilshod Abdullaev
- (Uzbekistan) Mukhammadali Reimov
- (Uzbekistan) Amir Saidov
- (Uzbekistan) Shodiyor Shodiboev
- (Vietnam) Lê Đình Long Vũ
- (Yemen) Abdulrahman Al Khader

1 own goal

- (Afghanistan) Mansoor Noorzai (against South Korea)
- (Japan) Daiki Miyagawa (against India)
- (Malaysia) Adib Ibrahim (against Yemen)
- (Saudi Arabia) Mahmoud Essa Al-Burayah (against Uzbekistan)

== Qualified teams for FIFA U-17 World Cup ==
The following five teams from AFC qualified for the 2023 FIFA U-17 World Cup, including Indonesia who qualified automatically as host.

Team	Qualified on	Previous appearances in FIFA U-17 World Cup^{1}
Indonesia	23 June 2023	0 (debut)
Iran	25 June 2023	4 (2001, 2009, 2013, 2017)
South Korea	25 June 2023	6 (1987, 2003, 2007, 2009, 2015, 2019)
Japan	26 June 2023	9 (1993, 1995, 2001, 2007, 2009, 2011, 2013, 2017, 2019)
Uzbekistan	26 June 2023	2 (2011, 2013)

^{1} Bold indicates champions for that year. Italic indicates hosts for that year.

== See also ==
- 2023 AFC Asian Cup
- 2023 AFC U-20 Asian Cup
