= 2027 AFC U-17 Asian Cup qualification =

International football tournament

Tournament details
- Host countries: Myanmar (Group A); Thailand (Group B); United Arab Emirates (Group C); Laos (Group D); Malaysia (Group E); Kyrgyzstan (Group F); Oman (Group G)
- Dates: 8–20 November 2026
- Teams: 35 (from 1 confederation)
- Venues: 9 (in 8 host cities)

Tournament statistics
- Matches played: 66
- Goals scored: 297 (4.5 per match)
- Top scorer(s): (India) Dallalmuon Gangte (7 goals)

The 2027 AFC U-17 Asian Cup qualification was an international men's under-17 football competition which was held to decide the participating teams of the 2027 AFC U-17 Asian Cup.

== Draw ==
Of the 47 Asian Football Confederation (AFC) member associations, a total of 44 teams entered the competition. The 9 teams that had qualified for the 2026 FIFA U-17 World Cup automatically qualified for the final tournament as hosts or participants. The other 35 teams participated in the qualifiers for the 2027 AFC U-17 Asian Cup.

The draw took place at the AFC Headquarters in Kuala Lumpur, Malaysia on 27 August 2026 at 15:00 local time (UTC+8).

The 35 teams were allocated into 7 groups of 5 teams each. Seven countries were selected to host the qualification groups and were drawn into separate groups. The draw was seeded based on the results of the last three editions, with 2026 weighted at 100%, 2025 at 50%, and 2023 at 25%.

Teams entering the qualification
	Pot 1	Pot 2	Pot 3	Pot 4	Pot 5
Host teams	Thailand **(H)**; United Arab Emirates **(H)**; Oman **(H)**	Malaysia **(H)**; Myanmar **(H)**; Laos **(H)**	Kyrgyzstan **(H)**		
Remaining teams	**Yemen**; **Indonesia**; **India**; **Iran**	**Iraq**; Bangladesh; ~~Turkmenistan~~ **(W)**; Kuwait	Afghanistan; **Syria**; Bahrain; Jordan; Hong Kong; Palestine	Pakistan; Mongolia; Singapore; **Lebanon**; Philippines; Chinese Taipei; Bhutan	Cambodia; Macau; Brunei; Northern Mariana Islands; Maldives; Sri Lanka; Guam

Did not enter
- Nepal **(S)**
- North Korea **(DNQ)**
- Timor-Leste

Notes

- Teams in **bold** qualified for the final tournament.
- (H): Qualification group hosts.
- (S): Suspended by FIFA
- (DNQ): Disqualified from the competition
- (W): Withdrew after draw

== Groups ==
Tie-breaking criteria
Teams were ranked according to points (3 points for a win, 1 point for a draw, and 0 points for a loss), and if tied on points, the following tiebreaking criteria were applied, in the order given, to determine the rankings (Regulations Article 7.2):
1. Points in head-to-head matches among tied teams;
2. Goal difference in head-to-head matches among tied teams;
3. Goals scored in head-to-head matches among tied teams;
4. If more than two teams were tied, and after applying all head-to-head criteria above, a subset of teams were still tied, all head-to-head criteria above were reapplied exclusively to this subset of teams;
5. Goal difference in all group matches;
6. Goals scored in all group matches;
7. Penalty shoot-out if only two teams remain tied and they met in the last round of the group;
8. Disciplinary points (yellow card = 1 point, red card as a result of two yellow cards = 3 points, direct red card = 3 points, yellow card followed by direct red card = 4 points);
9. Drawing of lots.

=== Group A ===
- All matches were held in Myanmar.
- Times listed are UTC+6:30.

Pos	Team	Pld	W	D	L	GF	GA	GD	Pts	Qualification
1	Indonesia	4	3	1	0	11	2	+9	10	Final tournament
2	Afghanistan	4	2	1	1	9	7	+2	7	
3	Myanmar (H)	4	1	2	1	7	8	−1	5	
4	Philippines	4	1	1	2	5	9	−4	4	
5	Cambodia	4	0	1	3	2	8	−6	1	

Source: AFC
(H) Hosts
8 November 2026
15:00

Cambodia	1–2	Philippines
Long 45+1'	Report	Müller 39', 69'

Starcity Sports Club, Thanlyin
Referee: Mohammad Osama Diwan (Jordan)
8 November 2026
15:00

Afghanistan	4–1	Myanmar
Qaderi 9'; Hammas 15', 23', 49'	Report	Thet Naing Oo 56' (pen.)

Thuwunna Stadium, Yangon
Referee: Clarence Leow Hong Wei (Singapore)

11 November 2026
15:00

Cambodia	0–3	Afghanistan
	Report	Somaun 18' (o.g.); Sadeqi 53'; Haidari 88'

Starcity Sports Club, Thanlyin
Referee: Lei-Ka Wong (Macau)
11 November 2026
15:00

Philippines	0–3	Indonesia
	Report	Dhamar 37', 45+1'; Majesta 76'

Thuwunna Stadium, Yangon
Referee: Mohammed Al-Jaberi (Iraq)

14 November 2026
15:00

Indonesia	2–0	Cambodia
Solossa 10'; Yatipai 35'	Report

Starcity Sports Club, Thanlyin
Referee: Hasan Al-Haddad (Kuwait)
14 November 2026
15:00

Myanmar	3–1	Philippines
Thura Hein Htet 45+1'; Paing Zay Tun 52'; Thet Naing Oo 77'	Report	Müller 70'

Thuwunna Stadium, Yangon
Referee: Mouhammad Ebo (Syria)

17 November 2026
15:00

Myanmar	1–1	Cambodia
Aung Myat Thar 90'	Report	Poy 10'

Starcity Sports Club, Thanlyin
Referee: Mohammed Al-Jaberi (Iraq)
17 November 2026
15:00

Afghanistan	0–4	Indonesia
	Report	Majesta 8'; Dzaky 52', 76'; Dhamar 72'

Thuwunna Stadium, Yangon
Referee: Mohammad Osama Diwan (Jordan)

20 November 2026
15:00

Philippines	2–2	Afghanistan
Paradies 12'; Müller 45+1'	Report	Dizon 68' (o.g.); Sadeqi 90+3'

Starcity Sports Club, Thanlyin
Referee: Clarence Leow Hong Wei (Singapore)
20 November 2026
15:00

Indonesia	2–2	Myanmar
Majesta 77'; Solossa 90+2'	Report	Thura Hein Htet 6'; Paing Zay Tun 78'

Thuwunna Stadium, Yangon
Referee: Lei-Ka Wong (Macau)

=== Group B ===
- All matches were held in Thailand.
- Times listed are UTC+7.

Pos	Team	Pld	W	D	L	GF	GA	GD	Pts	Qualification
1	Iraq	4	3	1	0	11	4	+7	10	Final tournament
2	Thailand (H)	4	3	0	1	14	4	+10	9	
3	Hong Kong	4	1	2	1	12	4	+8	5	
4	Chinese Taipei	4	1	1	2	9	8	+1	4	
5	Maldives	4	0	0	4	0	26	−26	0	

Source: AFC
(H) Hosts
8 November 2026
15:00

Hong Kong	1–1	Iraq
Lu Zheyang 65'	Report	Al-Furaiji 23' (pen.)

Buriram City Stadium, Buriram
Referee: Zakaria Ismail (Malaysia)
8 November 2026
19:00

Maldives	0–5	Chinese Taipei
	Report	Sung Chi-yu 10'; Chen Sheng-en 21'; Zhang Yi-le 66', 77'; Lai Min-en 70'

Buriram City Stadium, Buriram
Referee: Won Myung-hee (South Korea)

11 November 2026
15:00

Maldives	0–9	Hong Kong
	Report	Cheung Chun Lok 24', 58'; Lee Shing Chun 26', 74'; Lu Zheyang 42', 48'; Lam Ka Fung 44'; Zahid 86' (o.g.); Yu Li Feng 89'

Buriram City Stadium, Buriram
Referee: Nikita Mustafin (Uzbekistan)
11 November 2026
19:00

Chinese Taipei	1–4	Thailand
Lai Min-en 90+1'	Report	Tachin 6', 20'; Müller 25'; Schmitt 45'

Buriram City Stadium, Buriram
Referee: Ashwin Kumar (India)

14 November 2026
15:00

Iraq	3–2	Chinese Taipei
Al-Nidawi 53'; Al-Jubainawi 75'; Al-Hilfi 89'	Report	Zhang Yi-le 58', 90+3' (pen.)

Buriram City Stadium, Buriram
Referee: Mohanad Najiamre (Palestine)
14 November 2026
19:00

Thailand	7–0	Maldives
Tachin 7'; Pisitwut 17'; Phuriwat 24'; Pitchaya 26' (pen.); Siriwat 46', 49', 77'	Report

Buriram City Stadium, Buriram
Referee: Abdulaziz Mousa Abdulla (Qatar)

17 November 2026
15:00

Iraq	5–0	Maldives
Al-Nidawi 7'; Magsoosi 19'; Al-Jubainawi 47'; Al-Furaiji 70', 72'	Report

Buriram City Stadium, Buriram
Referee: Ashwin Kumar (India)
17 November 2026
19:00

Hong Kong	1–2	Thailand
Yu Ching Kok 85'	Report	Müller 27'; Siriwat 84'

Buriram City Stadium, Buriram
Referee: Won Myung-hee (South Korea)

20 November 2026
15:00

Chinese Taipei	1–1	Hong Kong
Liu Jin-wei 37'	Report	Wong Sean 65'

Buriram City Stadium, Buriram
Referee: Zakaria Ismail (Malaysia)
20 November 2026
19:00

Thailand	1–2	Iraq
Pitchaya 58' (pen.)	Report	Jale 5', 84'

Buriram City Stadium, Buriram
Referee: Nikita Mustafin (Uzbekistan)

=== Group C ===
- All matches were held in United Arab Emirates.
- Times listed are UTC+4.

Pos	Team	Pld	W	D	L	GF	GA	GD	Pts	Qualification
1	Syria	4	3	1	0	17	2	+15	10	Final tournament
2	United Arab Emirates (H)	4	3	1	0	9	1	+8	10	
3	Bangladesh	4	2	0	2	6	7	−1	6	
4	Macau	4	1	0	3	1	5	−4	3	
5	Bhutan	4	0	0	4	0	18	−18	0	

Source: AFC
(H) Hosts
8 November 2026
15:20

Syria	5–1	Bangladesh
Al-Sheikh Taha 16' (pen.); Al-Salhani 41' (pen.); Al-Hammoud 44'; Hossen 77' (o.g.); Ahmmad 90+1' (o.g.)	Report	Bostami 47'

Emirates Football Club Stadium, Ras Al Khaimah
Referee: Mrutyunjay Lingaraj Amatya (India)
8 November 2026
19:20

Macau	1–0	Bhutan
Chow Man Nok 70' (pen.)	Report

Saud Bin Saqr Al Qasimi Stadium, Ras Al Khaimah
Referee: Daichi Shiino (Japan)

11 November 2026
15:20

Macau	0–1	Syria
	Report	Al-Mostafa 8'

Saud Bin Saqr Al Qasimi Stadium, Ras Al Khaimah
Referee: Abdulmajeed Al-Ghadani (Oman)
11 November 2026
19:20

Bhutan	0–3	United Arab Emirates
	Report	Al Ali 5'; Gamal 47'; Namgyel 57' (o.g.)

Emirates Football Club Stadium, Ras Al Khaimah
Referee: Mahmoud Seifeddine (Lebanon)

14 November 2026
15:20

United Arab Emirates	3–0	Macau
A. Mohammed 18'; Al Ali 61'; Gamal 78'	Report

Emirates Football Club Stadium, Ras Al Khaimah
Referee: Soodin Thuwan Fazmi (Sri Lanka)
14 November 2026
19:20

Bangladesh	4–0	Bhutan
Ullah 8'; Ahmmed 15'; Bostami 28'; Arafat 67'	Report

Saud Bin Saqr Al Qasimi Stadium, Ras Al Khaimah
Referee: Huseen Jamal (Kuwait)

17 November 2026
15:20

Bangladesh	1–0	Macau
Mustakim 55'	Report

Saud Bin Saqr Al Qasimi Stadium, Ras Al Khaimah
Referee: Mahmoud Seifeddine (Lebanon)
17 November 2026
19:20

Syria	1–1	United Arab Emirates
Al-Salhani 30'	Report	Gamal 90+6' (pen.)

Emirates Football Club Stadium, Ras Al Khaimah
Referee: Daichi Shiino (Japan)

20 November 2026
15:20

Bhutan	0–10	Syria
	Report	Al-Sheikh Taha 10', 30'; Al-Bardan 37'; Tatari 45'; Al-Salhani 46', 70', 85', 89'; Al-Sulaiman 51'; Ali Knan 88'

Saud Bin Saqr Al Qasimi Stadium, Ras Al Khaimah
Referee: Mrutyunjay Lingaraj Amatya (India)
20 November 2026
19:20

United Arab Emirates	2–0	Bangladesh
Gamal 61' (pen.); Esaadi 90+4'	Report

Emirates Football Club Stadium, Ras Al Khaimah
Referee: Abdulmajeed Al-Ghadani (Oman)

=== Group D ===
- All matches were held in Laos.
- Times listed are UTC+7.

Pos	Team	Pld	W	D	L	GF	GA	GD	Pts	Qualification
1	Iran	4	4	0	0	18	0	+18	12	Final tournament
2	Jordan	4	2	1	1	14	5	+9	7	
3	Pakistan	4	2	1	1	8	4	+4	7	
4	Laos (H)	4	1	0	3	5	9	−4	3	
5	Sri Lanka	4	0	0	4	2	29	−27	0	

Source: AFC
(H) Hosts
8 November 2026
16:00

Sri Lanka	1–3	Pakistan
Mahalekamge 25'	Report	Hammad 57'; Moosa 68'; Abbas 71'

New Laos National Stadium, Vientiane
Referee: Yoshito Nakagawa (Japan)
8 November 2026
19:00

Jordan	2–0	Laos
Al-Hourani 11', 45+1'	Report

New Laos National Stadium, Vientiane
Referee: Bader Bujamhoor (United Arab Emirates)

11 November 2026
16:00

Pakistan	0–1	Iran
	Report	Zarei 9'

New Laos National Stadium, Vientiane
Referee: Su Zihao (China)
11 November 2026
19:00

Sri Lanka	0–10	Jordan
	Report	Al-Rawashdeh 17'; Al-Hourani 27', 58', 70'; Al-Eassa 48'; Abu Sheikha 55'; Al-Sa'sa' 75', 85', 90+1'; Abu Zema 90+3'

New Laos National Stadium, Vientiane
Referee: Ahmed Al-Kalbani (Oman)

14 November 2026
16:00

Iran	11–0	Sri Lanka
Kheshtzar 4'; Zarei 13', 28', 45+1' (pen.), 58'; Naderi 16' (pen.), 17'; Mirnezhaddarzi 40'; Alimardani 45+3'; Jannatalipour 56', 69'	Report

New Laos National Stadium, Vientiane
Referee: Wael Haidar (Lebanon)
14 November 2026
19:00

Laos	0–3	Pakistan
	Report	Essa 14', 45'; Abbas 27'

New Laos National Stadium, Vientiane
Referee: Hussain Al-Showaikh (Bahrain)

17 November 2026
16:00

Jordan	0–3	Iran
	Report	Naderi 33'; Zarei 36'; Jannatalipor 58'

New Laos National Stadium, Vientiane
Referee: Yoshito Nakagawa (Japan)
17 November 2026
19:00

Laos	5–1	Sri Lanka
Ekalath 23'; Sitthilath 25'; Sisombat 29'; Atiya 45+3'; Kaisone 90+1' (pen.)	Report	Mohiyaddeen 85'

New Laos National Stadium, Vientiane
Referee: Bader Bujamhoor (United Arab Emirates)

20 November 2026
16:00

Pakistan	2–2	Jordan
Mousa 45' (pen.), 52'	Report	Abu Sheikha 55'; Al-Hourani 90+3'

New Laos National Stadium, Vientiane
Referee: Hussain Al-Showaikh (Bahrain)
20 November 2026
19:00

Iran	3–0	Laos
Iranzad 17'; Moradi 45+4'; Naderi 78'	Report

New Laos National Stadium, Vientiane
Referee: Ahmed Al-Kalbani (Oman)

=== Group E ===
- All matches were held in Malaysia.
- Times listed are UTC+8.

Pos	Team	Pld	W	D	L	GF	GA	GD	Pts	Qualification
1	India	4	3	1	0	20	3	+17	10	Final tournament
2	Palestine	4	3	0	1	11	6	+5	9	
3	Malaysia (H)	4	2	1	1	12	3	+9	7	
4	Singapore	4	1	0	3	11	9	+2	3	
5	Guam	4	0	0	4	0	33	−33	0	

Source: AFC
(H) Hosts
8 November 2026
15:30

Guam	0–6	Singapore
	Report	Pereira 2' (pen.); Farid 5' (pen.); A. Irfan 21'; Lai 25'; T. Tan 45'; P. Irfan 46'

Kuala Lumpur Stadium, Kuala Lumpur
Referee: Abdullah Zarban (Saudi Arabia)
8 November 2026
21:00

Palestine	2–0	Malaysia
Khalifah 16'; Bustami 51'	Report

Kuala Lumpur Stadium, Kuala Lumpur
Referee: Ko Min-gook (South Korea)

11 November 2026
15:30

Guam	0–5	Palestine
	Report	Khalifah 2'; Jamhour 7'; Badarne 28'; Abu-Armaneh 31'; Abou-Atiq 66'

Kuala Lumpur Stadium, Kuala Lumpur
Referee: Mario Cheung Wai Lung (Hong Kong)
11 November 2026
21:00

Singapore	2–4	India
Farid 27', 65'	Report	Gangte 29', 62' (pen.), 83'; Maity 89'

Kuala Lumpur Stadium, Kuala Lumpur
Referee: Dan Ning (China)

14 November 2026
15:30

India	12–0	Guam
Thongbam 5'; Gangte 13', 27', 32'; Manavathi 20'; Irom 53'; Wahengbam 55', 73', 84', 85'; Saikhom 56'; Maity 87'	Report

Kuala Lumpur Stadium, Kuala Lumpur
Referee: Lin Te-en (Chinese Taipei)
14 November 2026
21:00

Malaysia	2–1	Singapore
Syaifullah 32'; Fahim 88'	Report	Farid 45'

Kuala Lumpur Stadium, Kuala Lumpur
Referee: Mohamed Jafran (Sri Lanka)

17 November 2026
15:30

Palestine	1–4	India
Khalifah 33' (pen.)	Report	Doungel 7'; Ningthoujam 51'; Gangte 58'; Lalhunmawia 88'

Kuala Lumpur Stadium, Kuala Lumpur
Referee: Ko Min-gook (South Korea)
17 November 2026
21:00

Malaysia	10–0	Guam
Azam 8'; Brian Felix 13', 40'; Muzakif 21', 34'; Shah 40'; Fazryel 43', 45+3', 90+3'; Shakirin 65'	Report

Kuala Lumpur Stadium, Kuala Lumpur
Referee: Dan Ning (China)

20 November 2026
15:30

Singapore	2–3	Palestine
A. Irfan 2'; Farid 90+3'	Report	Abou-Atiq 29'; Hariri 40'; Sharifeh 48'

Kuala Lumpur Stadium, Kuala Lumpur
Referee: Abdullah Zarban (Saudi Arabia)
20 November 2026
21:00

India	0–0	Malaysia
	Report

Kuala Lumpur Stadium, Kuala Lumpur
Referee: Mario Cheung Wai Lung (Hong Kong)

=== Group F ===
- All matches were held in Kyrgyzstan.
- Times listed are UTC+6.

Pos	Team	Pld	W	D	L	GF	GA	GD	Pts	Qualification
1	Yemen	3	2	1	0	17	1	+16	7	Final tournament
2	Kyrgyzstan (H)	3	2	1	0	14	1	+13	7	
3	Mongolia	3	1	0	2	4	6	−2	3	
4	Northern Mariana Islands	3	0	0	3	0	27	−27	0	
5	~~Turkmenistan~~	0	0	0	0	0	0	0	0	Withdrew

Source: AFC
(H) Hosts
8 November 2026
14:00

Northern Mariana Islands	0–2	Mongolia
	Report	Gurragchaa 31'; Byambasuren 55'

Dolen Omurzakov Stadium, Bishkek
Referee: Lakshay Tushir (India)
8 November 2026
18:00

Kyrgyzstan	Cancelled	Turkmenistan

Dolen Omurzakov Stadium, Bishkek

11 November 2026
14:00

Mongolia	1–4	Yemen
Bat-Ochir 75'	Report	Aziz 15' (pen.), 89'; Farea 49'; Sainbileg 60' (o.g.)

Dolen Omurzakov Stadium, Bishkek
Referee: Nguyễn Nhựt Quang (Vietnam)
11 November 2026
18:00

Northern Mariana Islands	0–12	Kyrgyzstan
	Report	Abilov 2' (pen.), 49'; Isaev 14', 39', 50'; Mirlanov 24', 73'; Askerbekov 40', 90+2'; Alimzhanov 53'; Emilev 61'; Khodzhaev 85'

Dolen Omurzakov Stadium, Bishkek
Referee: Muhammad Khairulsyahmi (Malaysia)

14 November 2026
14:00

Yemen	13–0	Northern Mariana Islands
Al-Hemyari 3', 45+2'; Al-Yahri 21'; Farea 26', 39', 80'; Aziz 45+1', 71', 75', 79'; Al-Ghrara 50'; Al-Sharafi 88', 90+2'	Report

Dolen Omurzakov Stadium, Bishkek
Referee: Ali Shams (Lebanon)
14 November 2026
18:00

Turkmenistan	Cancelled	Mongolia

Dolen Omurzakov Stadium, Bishkek

17 November 2026
14:00

Turkmenistan	Cancelled	Northern Mariana Islands

Dolen Omurzakov Stadium, Bishkek
17 November 2026
18:00

Kyrgyzstan	0–0	Yemen
	Report

Dolen Omurzakov Stadium, Bishkek
Referee: Jon Mick Pineda (Philippines)

20 November 2026
14:00

Yemen	Cancelled	Turkmenistan

Dolen Omurzakov Stadium, Bishkek
20 November 2026
18:00

Mongolia	1–2	Kyrgyzstan
Dulguun 36'	Report	Almazbekovich 71'; Askerbekov 86'

Dolen Omurzakov Stadium, Bishkek
Referee: Ali Shams (Lebanon)

=== Group G ===
- All matches were held in Oman.
- Times listed are UTC+4.

Pos	Team	Pld	W	D	L	GF	GA	GD	Pts	Qualification
1	Lebanon	4	4	0	0	15	3	+12	12	Final tournament
2	Oman (H)	4	3	0	1	16	2	+14	9	
3	Bahrain	4	1	1	2	8	5	+3	4	
4	Kuwait	4	1	1	2	8	9	−1	4	
5	Brunei	4	0	0	4	1	29	−28	0	

Source: AFC
(H) Hosts
8 November 2026
17:00

Bahrain	1–1	Kuwait
Aun 22'	Report	Al-Dawood 19'

Al-Saada Sports Complex, Salalah
Referee: Naufal Adya Fairuski (Indonesia)
8 November 2026
20:00

Brunei	0–7	Lebanon
	Report	Mouarkech 8'; Al-Zohbi 10'; Farchoukh 33'; Barouk 68', 81'; Imad 84'; El Awad 88' (pen.)

Al-Saada Sports Complex, Salalah
Referee: Alimardon Bainazarov (Kyrgyzstan)

11 November 2026
17:00

Lebanon	2–1	Oman
Hamieh 66'; El Awad 90+3'	Report	Al-Hashemi 71'

Al-Saada Sports Complex, Salalah
Referee: Ali Al-Qahtani (Saudi Arabia)
11 November 2026
20:00

Brunei	1–6	Bahrain
Syahmi 53'	Report	Tolefat 2', 29' (pen.); Ahmed 33'; Al-Daoudi 41', 90+5'; Ali 71'

Al-Saada Sports Complex, Salalah
Referee: Trần Huy Hoàng (Vietnam)

14 November 2026
17:00

Oman	10–0	Brunei
Redzuan 19' (o.g.); Al-Shamsi 25', 26', 30'; Ardhin 35'; Al-Omrani 51', 54'; Al-Hashemi 57'; Al-Jabri 58'; Al-Ajmi 71'	Report

Al-Saada Sports Complex, Salalah
Referee: John Mike Basinang (Philippines)
14 November 2026
20:00

Kuwait	1–4	Lebanon
Al-Mulla 81'	Report	Mouarkech 34', 69'; Hamieh 54'; Kirdi 90+6'

Al-Saada Sports Complex, Salalah
Referee: Suhail Abdulla Ali Al-Mulla (United Arab Emirates)

17 November 2026
17:00

Bahrain	0–1	Oman
	Report	Al-Jabri 27'

Al-Saada Sports Complex, Salalah
Referee: Suhail Abdulla Ali Al-Mulla (United Arab Emirates)
17 November 2026
20:00

Kuwait	6–0	Brunei
Al-Dawood 56', 59', 61'; Al-Ali 62', 66'; Al-Saffar 76'	Report

Al-Saada Sports Complex, Salalah
Referee: Ali Al-Qahtani (Saudi Arabia)

20 November 2026
17:00

Lebanon	2–1	Bahrain
Al-Zohbi 64'; Hamieh 89'	Report	Ahmed 40'

Al-Saada Sports Complex, Salalah
Referee: John Mike Basinang (Philippines)
20 November 2026
20:00

Oman	4–0	Kuwait
Al-Hashemi 16', 61'; Ardhin 45+4'; Al-Shamsi 52'	Report

Al-Saada Sports Complex, Salalah
Referee: Alimardon Bainazarov (Kyrgyzstan)

== Qualified teams ==
The following 16 teams qualified for the final tournament.

Team	Qualified as	Appearance	Previous best performance
Uzbekistan	Hosts	13th	Champions (2012, 2025)
Qatar	World Cup Hosts	13th	Champions (1990)
Japan	2026 champions	19th	Champions (1994, 2006, 2018, 2023, 2026)
China	2026 runners-up	18th	Champions (1992, 2004)
Australia	2026 semi-finalist	10th	Semi-finals (2010, 2014, 2018, 2026)
South Korea	2026 quarter-finalist	18th	Champions (1986, 2002)
Saudi Arabia	2026 quarter-finalist	14th	Champions (1985, 1988)
Tajikistan	2026 quarter-finalist	7th	Runners-up (2018)
Vietnam	2026 quarter-finalist	11th	Fourth place (2000)
Indonesia	Group A winners	9th	Fourth place (1990)
Iraq	Group B winners	11th	Champions (2016)
Syria	Group C winners	7th	Semi-finals (2014)
Iran	Group D winners	14th	Champions (2008)
India	Group E winners	10th	Quarter-finals (2002, 2018)
Yemen	Group F winners	10th	Runners-up (2002)
Lebanon	Group G winners	1st	Debut

== Goalscorers ==
There were 297 goals scored in 66 matches, for an average of 4.5 goals per match.

7 goals

- (India) Dallalmuon Gangte

6 goals

- (Iran) Amirmohammad Zarei
- (Jordan) Faisal Al-Hourani
- (Syria) Qussi Al-Salhani
- (Yemen) Mohammed Sadeq Aziz

5 goals

- (Singapore) Izzan Farid

4 goals

- (Chinese Taipei) Zhang Yi-le
- (India) Raj Singh Wahengbam
- (Indonesia) Dewa Majesta
- (Iran) Aliasghar Naderi
- (Oman) Abdul Rahman Al-Hashemi
- (Oman) Bashar Al-Shamsi
- (Pakistan) Muhammad Moosa
- (Philippines) Kai Müller
- (Kuwait) Bader Al-Dawood
- (Thailand) Siriwat Hwaaied
- (United Arab Emirates) Salem Bani Gamal
- (Yemen) Ali Farea

3 goals

- (Afghanistan) Mohammad Fahim Hammas
- (Hong Kong) Lu Zheyang
- (Indonesia) Dhamar Try Kusuma
- (Indonesia) Dolvi Solossa
- (Iran) Amirsam Jannatalipour
- (Iraq) Hasan Al-Furaiji
- (Jordan) Khaled Al Sa’sa
- (Kyrgyzstan) Alymbek Isaev
- (Kyrgyzstan) Erzhan Askerbekov
- (Lebanon) Malek Mouarkech
- (Lebanon) Mohamad Hamieh
- (Malaysia) Mohamad Fazryel Ashraf
- (Palestine) Yazan Khalifah
- (Syria) Ahmad Al-Sheikh Taha
- (Thailand) Tachin Yeewangkong

2 goals

- (Afghanistan) Jaweed Sadeqi
- (Bahrain) Abdulrahman Ahmed
- (Bahrain) Ebrahim Tolefat
- (Bahrain) Badr Aldaoudi
- (Bangladesh) Bayzit Bostami
- (Chinese Taipei) Lai Min-en
- (Hong Kong) Lee Shing Chun
- (Hong Kong) Cheung Chun Lok
- (India) Ristik Maity
- (Indonesia) Dzaky Azfar
- (Iraq) Abdullah Al-Jubainawi
- (Iraq) Rasool Al-Nidawi
- (Iraq) Yousif Jale
- (Jordan) Yousef Abu Sheikha
- (Kyrgyzstan) Baiel Mirlanoc
- (Kyrgyzstan) Ariet Abilov
- (Kuwait) Abdullah Al-Ali
- (Lebanon) Wissam El Awad
- (Lebanon) Jad Al-Zohbi
- (Lebanon) Jad Barouk
- (Malaysia) Ahmad Muzakif Fitri
- (Malaysia) Brian Felix Harrison Paulus
- (Myanmar) Thet Naing Oo
- (Myanmar) Thura Hein Htet
- (Myanmar) Paing Zay Tun
- (Oman) Mohammed Al-Omrani
- (Oman) Nayer Bait Ardhin
- (Oman) Said Al-Jabri
- (Pakistan) Muhammad Essa
- (Pakistan) Hazrat Abbas
- (Palestine) Zein Abou-Atiq
- (Singapore) Aidan Irfan
- (Thailand) Pitchaya Wuttichai
- (Thailand) Marlon Müller
- (United Arab Emirates) Mansoor Al Ali
- (Yemen) Elyas Al-Hemyari
- (Yemen) Yaseen Al-Sharafi

1 goal

- (Afghanistan) Mojtaba Haidari
- (Afghanistan) Taib Qaderi
- (Bahrain) Zeyad Aun
- (Bahrain) Ali Khamed Ali
- (Bangladesh) Eyasin Arafat
- (Bangladesh) Mohin Ahmmed
- (Bangladesh) Hedayet Ullah
- (Bangladesh) Injamul Mustakim
- (Brunei) Arif Syahmi
- (Cambodia) Long Bich
- (Cambodia) Poy Boty
- (Hong Kong) Yu Ching Kok
- (Hong Kong) Yu Li Feng
- (Hong Kong) Lam Ka Fung
- (Hong Kong) Wong Sean
- (India) Zoramdinthara Lalhunmawia
- (India) Mukundo Singh Ningthoujam
- (India) Kamgouhao Doungel
- (India) Felix Meitei Saikhom
- (India) Hrishikesh Charan Manavathi
- (India) Leo Thongbam
- (India) David Mangang Irom
- (Indonesia) Melki Yatipai
- (Iran) Mohammadparsa Kheshtzar
- (Iran) Amirali Alimardani
- (Iran) Seyedradin Mirnezhaddarzi
- (Iran) Mohammad Hossein Moradi
- (Iran) Keyvan Iranzad
- (Iraq) Abbas Magsoosi
- (Iraq) Sajjad Al-Hilfi
- (Jordan) Fayez Al-Rawashdeh
- (Jordan) Faris Abu Zema
- (Jordan) Jamil Al-Eassa
- (Kuwait) Hasan Al-Mulla
- (Kuwait) Hussain Al-Saffar
- (Kyrgyzstan) Azizkhon Khodzhaev
- (Kyrgyzstan) Ariet Almazbekovich
- (Kyrgyzstan) Emir Emilev
- (Kyrgyzstan) Salavat Abdullazhanovich
- (Laos) Ekalath Wilaikul
- (Laos) Sitthilath Chanthamaly
- (Laos) Sisombat Vilaysone
- (Laos) Atiya Inthavong
- (Laos) Kaisone Muenvisetth
- (Lebanon) Hussein Kirdi
- (Lebanon) Ibrahim Farchoukh
- (Lebanon) Ralph Imad
- (Macau) Chow Man Nok
- (Malaysia) Muhammed Haziq Shakirin
- (Malaysia) Muhammad Shah Haqiqullah
- (Malaysia) Nur Azam Muslim
- (Malaysia) Syaifullah Mahruzi
- (Malaysia) Fahim Akmal
- (Mongolia) Bold-Erdene Bat-Ochir
- (Mongolia) Bilegt Byambasuren
- (Mongolia) Enerel Gurragchaa
- (Mongolia) Enkh-Amgalan Dulguun
- (Myanmar) Aung Myat Thar
- (Oman) Al Hussain Al-Ajmi
- (Pakistan) Muhammad Hammad
- (Palestine) Ali Hariri
- (Palestine) Abdelrahman Sharifeh
- (Palestine) Mohammed Jamhour
- (Palestine) Yazan Abumarneh
- (Palestine) Yunan Badarne
- (Palestine) Yousef Alexander
- (Philippines) Alejo Paradies
- (Singapore) Caden Pereira
- (Singapore) Lai Keng Lum
- (Singapore) Tyler Tan
- (Singapore) Putera Nur Irfan
- (Sri Lanka) Nidarsha Mahalekamge
- (Sri Lanka) Shimaak Mohiyaddeen
- (Syria) Azzam Al-Sulaiman
- (Syria) Aram Al-Hammoud
- (Syria) Mohammad Al-Mostafa
- (Syria) Mohammad Ali Knan
- (Syria) Mahmoud Al-Bardan
- (Syria) Mohamad Rabee Tatari
- (Thailand) Pisitwut Sawkhom
- (Thailand) Phuriwat Buacharoen
- (Thailand) Thomas Junior Thai Schmitt
- (Chinese Taipei) Sung Chi-yu
- (Chinese Taipei) Chen Sheng-en
- (Chinese Taipei) Liu Jin-wei
- (United Arab Emirates) Mohammed Abdulrahman Mohammed
- (United Arab Emirates) Saif Hisham Esaadi
- (Yemen) Khaled Al-Ghrara
- (Yemen) Ahmed Al-Yahri

1 own goal

- (Bangladesh) Tarek Hossen (against Syria)
- (Bangladesh) Md Maruf Ahammad (against Syria)
- (Bhutan) Tenzin Namgyel (against United Arab Emirates)
- (Brunei) Mohd Hashry Redzuan (against Oman)
- (Cambodia) It Somaun (against Afghanistan)
- (Maldives) Asyadh Mohahed Zahid (against Hong Kong)
- (Mongolia) Khanbileg Sainbileg (against Yemen)
- (Philippines) Francis Dizon (against Afghanistan)

== See also ==
- 2027 AFC U-17 Asian Cup
- 2026 AFC U-23 Asian Cup
- 2027 AFC U-20 Asian Cup qualification
- 2027 AFC U-17 Women's Asian Cup qualification
