= Hong Kong national under-17 football team =

National association football team

Hong Kong Under-17
- Association: Hong Kong Football Association
- Confederation: AFC (Asia)
- Head coach: Takuro Hosaka
- FIFA code: HKG
| First colours | Second colours |

AFC U-16 Championship
- Appearances: 1 (first in 2014)
- Best result: Group stage (2014)

The Hong Kong national under-17 football team is a national association football youth team of Hong Kong and is controlled by the Football Association of Hong Kong, China.

== Recent results and fixtures ==
=== 2025 ===
==== U-16 ====
| 22 November 2026 AFC U-17 ACQ | Hong Kong | 2–0 | Macau | Hanoi, Vietnam |
| 16:00 UTC+7 | Tung 19'; Sean Wong 58' | Report | | Stadium: Vietnam YFTC Field No. 3 Referee: Ismaeel Fazal (Pakistan) |

| 24 November 2026 AFC U-17 ACQ | Malaysia | 1–0 | Hong Kong | Hanoi, Vietnam |
| 16:00 UTC+7 | Iman Danish 65' | Report | | Stadium: Vietnam YFTC Field No. 3 Referee: Mohammed Saleh Alghamdi (Saudi Arabia) |

| 26 November 2026 AFC U-17 ACQ | Vietnam | 2–0 | Hong Kong | Hưng Yên, Vietnam |
| 19:00 UTC+7 | Nguyễn Minh Thủy 11'; Nguyễn Mạnh Cường 72' | Report | | Stadium: PVF Stadium; Referee: Cllifford Daypuyat (Philippines) |

| 28 November 2026 AFC U-17 ACQ | Hong Kong | 4–0 | Northern Mariana Islands | Hanoi, Vietnam |
| 19:00 UTC+7 | Sephrey Ma 5'; Leung 53'; Eden Tung 71'; Lam 88' | Report | | Stadium: Vietnam YFTC Field No. 3 Referee: Daniel Cook (Australia) |

| 30 November 2026 AFC U-17 ACQ | Singapore | 1–1 | Hong Kong | Hanoi, Vietnam |
| 19:00 UTC+7 | Zharfan 72' | Report | Lau Yat Laam 7' | Stadium: Vietnam YFTC Field No. 3 Referee: Rustam Choriev (Uzbekistan) |

==== U-15 ====
| 18 December 2025 EAFF U-15 | Hong Kong | 2–0 | South Korea | Zhangzhou, China |
| 10:10 UTC+8 | | Report | | Stadium: Hooray International Football Training Base A-05 Pitch; Referee: Jiang Yuhuai (China) |

| 20 December 2025 EAFF U-15 | Hong Kong | 0–2 | Japan | Zhangzhou, China |
| 10:10 UTC+8 | | Report | Yu Nanakubo 39'; Ren Isobe 70+1' | Stadium: Hooray International Football Training Base Pitch 5 Referee: Shi Liangyi (China) |

| 22 December 2025 EAFF U-15 | China | 3–0 | Hong Kong | Zhangzhou, China |
| 15:00 UTC+8 | | Report | | Stadium: Hooray International Football Training Base Stadium; Referee: Peng yuyang (China) |

=== 2026 ===
| 8 November 2027 AFC U-17 ACQ | Hong Kong | 1–1 | Iraq | Buriram, Thailand |
| 15:00 UTC+7 | Lu Zheyang 65' | Report | Hayder 23' (pen.) | Stadium: Buriram City Stadium; Referee: Zakaria Ismail (Malaysia) |

| 11 November 2027 AFC U-17 ACQ | Maldives | 0–9 | Hong Kong | Buriram, Thailand |
| 15:00 UTC+7 | | | | Stadium: Buriram Stadium |

| 17 November 2027 AFC U-17 ACQ | Hong Kong | 1–2 | Thailand | Buriram, Thailand |
| 19:00 UTC+7 | | | | Stadium: Buriram Stadium |

| 20 November 2027 AFC U-17 ACQ | Chinese Taipei | 1-1 | Hong Kong | Buriram, Thailand |
| 15:00 UTC+7 | | | | Stadium: Buriram Stadium |

==== U-16 ====
| 3 July Asia International Youth Soccer | Hong Kong | 3–1 | (Japan) Tottori Select U-16 | Tottori, Japan |
| 16:00 UTC+9 | | | | Stadium: DoraDoraPark Football Stadium |

| 4 July Asia International Youth Soccer | Hong Kong | 3–1 | (South Korea) Munseong H.S. U-16 | Tottori, Japan |
| 16:00 UTC+9 | | | | Stadium: DoraDoraPark Athletic Stadium |

| 5 July Asia International Youth Soccer | Hong Kong | 1–0 | (Japan) Gainare Tottori U-16 | Tottori, Japan |
| 17:30 UTC+9 | | | | Stadium: All Gainare Yajin Stadium |

| 16 August Friendly | Hong Kong | 2–2 (5–4 p) | (England) Man Utd U-16 | Mong Kok, Hong Kong |
| 18:00 UTC+8 | | | | Stadium: Mong Kok Stadium; Attendance: 4,435 |

== Coaching staff ==
| Position | Name |
|---|---|
| Head coach | (Japan) Takuro Hosaka |
| Executive Manager | (Hong Kong) Liu Chun Fai |
| Assistant coach | (Hong Kong) Cheung Kin Fung |
| Goalkeeper coach | (Hong Kong) Fan Chun Yip |
| Physical Coach | (England) Mathew Pears |
| Specialist Conditioning Coach | (Hong Kong) Stephen Lee |
| Technical Staff | (Hong Kong) Wu Chi Hang |
| Physiotherapist | (Hong Kong) Lo Ho Cheong (Hong Kong) Yau Kai Ching |

== Most recent squad ==
The following 23 players were named to participate in the AFC U-17 Asian Cup qualifiers held on 22–30 November 2025.

| No. | Pos. | Player | Date of birth (age) | Caps | Club |
|---|---|---|---|---|---|
| | GK | Hung Hei Yin | 6 January 2010 (age 16) | | (Hong Kong) Eastern |
| | GK | Tang Pui Chun | 13 February 2009 (age 17) | | (Hong Kong) Kitchee |
| | GK | Lo Kin Fung | 11 June 2010 (age 16) | | (Hong Kong) Lee Man |
| | DF | Wai Yi Yeung | 20 November 2009 (age 17) | | (England) Brooke House College |
| | DF | Lau Yat Laam | 1 August 2009 (age 17) | | (Hong Kong) Rangers |
| | DF | Milos Wong | 26 March 2009 (age 17) | | (Hong Kong) Rangers |
| | DF | Uriel Contiero | 17 November 2009 (age 17) | | (Hong Kong) Eastern |
| | DF | Rhys Brown | 12 July 2010 (age 16) | | (Hong Kong) Kitchee |
| | DF | Fong Chun Kit | 7 April 2010 (age 16) | | (Hong Kong) Kitchee |
| | DF | Poon Wing Kei | 17 April 2009 (age 17) | | (Hong Kong) Kitchee |
| | DF | Lee Sen Hei | 18 June 2010 (age 16) | | (Hong Kong) Kitchee |
| | MF | Chong Chik Shun | 28 October 2009 (age 17) | | (Hong Kong) HKFC |
| | MF | Leung Tsz Yin | 21 January 2009 (age 17) | | (Hong Kong) Kitchee |
| | MF | Bau Hok Yin | 24 October 2010 (age 16) | | (Hong Kong) Lee Man |
| | MF | Jay Marc Chan | 14 September 2009 (age 17) | | (Spain) Alcorcón |
| | MF | Joshua Baker | 5 October 2009 (age 17) | | (United States) Shattuck St. Mary's Academy |
| | MF | Wong Yat Hin | 24 February 2009 (age 17) | | (Japan) Yamagata Meisei High School |
| | FW | Damon Chiu | 22 April 2009 (age 17) | | (Hong Kong) Rangers |
| | FW | Sean Wong | 17 February 2010 (age 16) | | (Hong Kong) Rangers |
| | FW | Yu Li Feng | 30 June 2010 (age 16) | | (Hong Kong) Rangers |
| | FW | Tung Ki Lok | 7 June 2009 (age 17) | | (United States) Connecticut FC |
| | FW | Lam Tsun Wing | 31 March 2009 (age 17) | | (Hong Kong) Kitchee |
| | FW | Ma Lok | 8 February 2010 (age 16) | | (Hong Kong) Kitchee |

=== Recent call-ups ===
The following players have been called up for the team within the previous 12 months.

| No. | Pos. | Player | Date of birth (age) | Caps | Club |

== Competition records ==
=== FIFA U-17 World Cup record ===
FIFA U-17 World Cup
| Hosts / Year | Result | GP | W | D | L | GS | GA |
|---|---|---|---|---|---|---|---|
| (China) 1985 | did not enter | – | – | – | – | – | – |
| (Canada) 1987 | did not enter | – | – | – | – | – | – |
| (Scotland) 1989 | did not qualify | – | – | – | – | – | – |
| (Italy) 1991 | did not qualify | – | – | – | – | – | – |
| (Japan) 1993 | did not enter | – | – | – | – | – | – |
| (Ecuador) 1995 | did not qualify | – | – | – | – | – | – |
| (Egypt) 1997 | did not qualify | – | – | – | – | – | – |
| (New Zealand) 1999 | did not qualify | – | – | – | – | – | – |
| (Trinidad and Tobago) 2001 | did not qualify | – | – | – | – | – | – |
| (Finland) 2003 | did not qualify | – | – | – | – | – | – |
| (Peru) 2005 | did not qualify | – | – | – | – | – | – |
| (South Korea) 2007 | did not qualify | – | – | – | – | – | – |
| (Nigeria) 2009 | did not qualify | – | – | – | – | – | – |
| (Mexico) 2011 | did not qualify | – | – | – | – | – | – |
| (United Arab Emirates) 2013 | did not qualify | – | – | – | – | – | – |
| (Chile) 2015 | did not qualify | – | – | – | – | – | – |
| (India) 2017 | did not qualify | – | – | – | – | – | – |
| (Brazil) 2019 | did not qualify | – | – | – | – | – | – |
| (Peru) 2021 | did not qualify | – | – | – | – | – | – |
| (Indonesia) 2023 | did not qualify | – | – | – | – | – | – |
| (Qatar) 2025 | did not qualify | – | – | – | – | – | – |
| (Qatar) 2026 | did not qualify | – | – | – | – | – | – |
| Total | | – | – | – | – | – | – |

=== AFC U-17 Asian Cup record ===
| Hosts / Year | Result | GP | W | D | L | GS | GA |
|---|---|---|---|---|---|---|---|
| (Qatar) 1985 | Withdrew | – | – | – | – | – | – |
| (Qatar) 1986 | did not enter | – | – | – | – | – | – |
| (Thailand) 1988 | did not qualify | – | – | – | – | – | – |
| (United Arab Emirates) 1990 | did not qualify | – | – | – | – | – | – |
| (Saudi Arabia) 1992 | did not enter | – | – | – | – | – | – |
| (Qatar) 1994 | did not qualify | – | – | – | – | – | – |
| (Thailand) 1996 | did not qualify | – | – | – | – | – | – |
| (Qatar) 1998 | did not qualify | – | – | – | – | – | – |
| (Vietnam) 2000 | did not qualify | – | – | – | – | – | – |
| (United Arab Emirates) 2002 | did not qualify | – | – | – | – | – | – |
| (Japan) 2004 | did not qualify | – | – | – | – | – | – |
| (Singapore) 2006 | did not qualify | – | – | – | – | – | – |
| (Uzbekistan) 2008 | did not qualify | – | – | – | – | – | – |
| (Uzbekistan) 2010 | did not qualify | – | – | – | – | – | – |
| (Iran) 2012 | did not qualify | – | – | – | – | – | – |
| (Thailand) 2014 | Group stage | 3 | 0 | 0 | 3 | 0 | 6 |
| (India) 2016 | did not qualify | – | – | – | – | – | – |
| (Malaysia) 2018 | did not qualify | – | – | – | – | – | – |
| (Thailand) 2023 | did not qualify | – | – | – | – | – | – |
| (Saudi Arabia) 2025 | did not qualify | – | – | – | – | – | – |
| (Saudi Arabia) 2026 | did not qualify | – | – | – | – | – | – |
| Total | 1/20 | 3 | 0 | 0 | 3 | 0 | 6 |

== See also ==
- Hong Kong national football team
- Hong Kong national under-23 football team
- Hong Kong national under-20 football team
- Football Association of Hong Kong, China
- Football in Hong Kong
- Sport in Hong Kong
- Hong Kong
