= 2027 AFC U-17 Asian Cup =

2027 yilgi U-17 Osiyo Kubogi

Tournament details
- Host country: Uzbekistan
- Dates: 12–29 May 2027
- Teams: 16 (from 1 confederation)

The 2027 AFC U-17 Asian Cup will be the 22nd edition of the AFC U-17 Asian Cup (including previous editions of the AFC U-17 Championship and AFC U-16 Championship), the annual international youth association football championship organised by the Asian Football Confederation (AFC) for the men's under-17 national teams of Asia. It was originally intended to be the third of four consecutive U-17 Asian Cups held in Saudi Arabia from 2025 to 2028. However, on July 30, 2026, AFC announced that the hosting rights have been transferred to Uzbekistan, and Saudi Arabia will be compensated by hosting the 2029 edition.

The top eight teams of the tournament will qualify for the 2027 FIFA U-17 World Cup in Qatar as the AFC representatives.

Japan were the defending champions, having won their fifth title in 2026.

== Qualification ==
The host country of the 2027 FIFA U-17 World Cup (Qatar) and the top eight teams of the 2026 U-17 Asian Cup (which includes hosts Uzbekistan) qualified automatically, while the other seven teams decided by qualification, held between 8-20 November, 2026.

=== Qualified teams ===
The following teams qualified for the tournament.

Team	Qualification method	Date of qualification	Appearance(s)			Previous best performance
Team	Qualification method	Date of qualification	Total	First	Last	Previous best performance
Uzbekistan	Hosts	30 July 2026	13th	1994	2026	**Champions** (2012, 2025)
Australia	AFC teams at the 2026 FIFA U-17 World Cup	10 May 2026	10th	2008	2026	Semi-finalists (2010, 2014, 2018, 2026)
Saudi Arabia	AFC teams at the 2026 FIFA U-17 World Cup	9 May 2026	14th	1985	2026	**Champions** (1985, 1988)
Tajikistan	AFC teams at the 2026 FIFA U-17 World Cup	9 May 2026	7th	2006	2026	Runners-up (2018)
Japan	AFC teams at the 2026 FIFA U-17 World Cup	12 May 2026	19th	1985	2026	**Champions** (1994, 2006, 2018, 2023, 2026)
China	AFC teams at the 2026 FIFA U-17 World Cup	12 May 2026	18th	1985	2026	**Champions** (1992, 2004)
Vietnam	AFC teams at the 2026 FIFA U-17 World Cup	13 May 2026	11th	2000	2026	Fourth place (2000)
South Korea	AFC teams at the 2026 FIFA U-17 World Cup	13 May 2026	18th	1986	2026	**Champions** (1986, 2002)
Qatar	AFC teams at the 2026 FIFA U-17 World Cup	14 May 2026	13th	1985	2026	**Champions** (1990)
Indonesia	Group A winners	17 November 2026	9th	1986	2026	Fourth place (1990)
Iraq	Group B winners	20 November 2026	11th	1985	2018	**Champions** (2016)
Syria	Group C winners	20 November 2026	7th	2002	2014	Semi-finalists (2014)
Iran	Group D winners	17 November 2026	14th	1996	2025	**Champions** (2008)
India	Group E winners	20 November 2026	11th	1990	2026	Quarter-finals (2002, 2018)
Yemen	Group F winners	20 November 2026	10th	2002	2026	Runners-up (2002)
Lebanon	Group G winners	17 November 2026	1st	None		Debut

Key

- **Bold** text indicates they hosted that edition.

== Qualified teams for FIFA U-17 World Cup ==
The following nine teams from AFC qualified for the 2027 FIFA U-17 World Cup in Qatar; Qatar automatically qualified as the hosts.

Team	Qualified on	Previous appearances in FIFA U-17 World Cup
Qatar	14 March 2024	8 (1985, 1987, 1991, 1993, 1995, 1999, 2005, 2025, 2026)
TBD	May 2027	
TBD	May 2027	
TBD	May 2027	
TBD	May 2027	
TBD	May 2027	
TBD	May 2027	
TBD	May 2027	
TBD	May 2027	

Key

- **Bold** indicates champions for that year.
- Italic indicates hosts for that year.
