= Singapore national under-17 football team =

National U-17 association football team

Singapore U15/16/17s
- Nickname(s): The Cubs; The Young Lions; The Schoolboys
- Association: Football Association of Singapore
- Confederation: AFC (Asia)
- Sub-confederation: AFF (Southeast Asia)
- Head coach: Ashraf Ariffin
- Captain: Keegan Phang
- Home stadium: Jalan Besar Stadium (temporarily shared with the senior team)
- FIFA code: SIN
First colours	Second colours

First international
- Singapore 3–1 Zimbabwe (Singapore; 13 August 2010)

Biggest win
- Singapore 14–0 Guam (Bishan, Singapore; 27 October 2024)

Biggest defeat
- Indonesia 12–0 Singapore (Indonesia; 10 June 2017)

Asian Cup
- Appearances: 2 (first in 2006)
- Best result: Group Stage (2006, 2008)

ASEAN Championship
- Appearances: 8 (first in (Malaysia) / (Indonesia) 2002)
- Best result: 2008 & 2011 – Fourth place
Medal record
Football
Youth Olympic Games
Bronze medal – third place	2010 Youth Olympics	u16s
Lion City Cup
Runner-up	2011 Lion City Cup	u16s
Third place	2011 Lion City Cup	u15s
- Website: FAS

The Singapore national youth football team, nicknamed the Cubs, can refer to either of the following teams: the Under-16 team that represented the nation in the inaugural Youth Olympic Games and the Lion City Cup, and the Under-15s, which also took part in the Lion City Cup, and also the AFF U16 Championship. The youth team's honours include bronze for the Youth Olympic Games in 2010 on home soil, as well as second and third places for the Lion City Cup (the former being the U16s and the latter being the U15s).

== History ==
=== Youth Olympics – The road to bronze (2010) ===
2010 marked the breakthrough for the Under-15 team as they went through the Youth Olympic Games, held on home soil, comfortably. They got through the semi-finals before losing to eventual silver medalists Haiti. Singapore then beat Montenegro 4–1 to grab the bronze medal.

==== Group stage ====
Team	Pld	W	D	L	GF	GA	GD	Pts
Singapore	2	2	0	0	6	3	+3	6
Montenegro	2	1	0	1	4	4	0	3
Zimbabwe	2	0	0	2	2	5	−3	0

13 August 2010	Singapore	3–1	Zimbabwe	Jalan Besar Stadium, Singapore
20:45	Ammirul Emmran 1'; Muhaimin Suhaimi 11', 30'	Report	Albert Kusemwa 64' (pen.)	Attendance: 4,800; Referee: Walter López (Guatemala)

19 August 2010	Montenegro	2–3	Singapore	Jalan Besar Stadium, Singapore
20:45	Nebojša Kosović 9', 23' (pen.)	Report	Muhaimin Suhaimi 3'; Jeffrey Lightfoot 35'; Brandon Koh 75'	Attendance: 5,850; Referee: Wilmar Roldan (Colombia)

==== Semi-finals ====
22 August 2010	Singapore	0–2	Haiti	Jalan Besar Stadium, Singapore
20:45		Report	Jean Bonhomme 38'; Daniel Gedeon 80' (pen.)	Attendance: 6,000; Referee: István Vad (Hungary)

==== Bronze medal match ====
25 August 2010	Montenegro	1–4	Singapore	Jalan Besar Stadium, Singapore
18:00	Jovan Baošić 14'	Report	Hanafi Akbar 6', 45'; Ammirul Emmran 57' (pen.), 65'	Attendance: 4,380; Referee: Norbert Hauata (Tahiti)

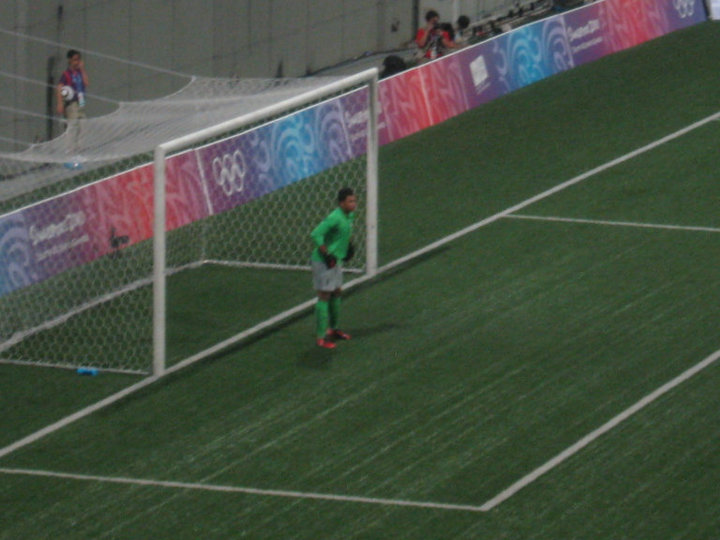
Goalkeeper Fashah Rosedin Iskandar during the bronze medal match between Montenegro and Singapore.

This match involved a lot of controversy, with a few Montenegro players accused of diving. Drawn 1–1, Singapore came back and eventually won the match 4–1.

=== Lion City Cup: Under-16s journey (2011) ===
Though captain Jeffrey Lightfoot was absent with an injury, the Under-16s became runners up of the competition under temporary captain Dhukhilan Jeevamani. They also went with new coach Takuma Koga.

==== Group stage ====
All attendances are referenced from ->

Team	Pld	W	D	L	GF	GA	GD	Pts
(Brazil) CR Flamengo U15	2	1	1	0	2	1	+1	4
Singapore U16	2	0	2	0	2	2	0	2
(England) Everton U15	2	0	1	1	1	2	−1	1

20 June 2011	Singapore U16	1–1	(Brazil) CR Flamengo U15	Jalan Besar Stadium, Singapore
18:00	Muhaimin Suhaimi 70'	Report	Jorge Marco 82'	Attendance: 2,490

22 June 2011	Everton U15 (England)	1–1	Singapore U16	Jalan Besar Stadium, Singapore
20:45	Callum Dyson 20'	Report	Hazim Hassan 22'	Attendance: 2,425

==== Semi finals ====
All attendances are referenced from ->
Singapore was first to shoot for penalties.

24 June 2011 Semi-final	Juventus U15 (Italy)	2–2 (3–4 p)	Singapore U16	Jalan Besar Stadium, Singapore
20:45	Fabio Gili 60'; Gianluca Tartaglia 70'	Report	Hazim Hassan 6' 13'	Attendance: 2,390
	Penalties
	Davide Faverato; Andrea Giannarelli (penalty missed); Federico Crepaldi; Federico Rinaldi; Lorenzo Zarmanian (penalty missed)		(penalty missed) Muhaimin Suhaimi; Hazim Hassan; Iskandar Khairul Anuar; Jonathan Tan; IIlyas Lee

In the semi-final between the youth team and Juventus U15, man of the match Hazim Hassan scored two goals in the first half, and Juventus came back with another two in the second. The Singapore team beat Juventus in the penalty shootout.

==== Final ====
26 June 2011 Final	Singapore U16	0–0 (3–4 p)	(Brazil) CR Flamengo U15	Jalan Besar Stadium, Singapore
20:45		Report		Attendance: 2,848
	Penalties
	Hanafi Akbar; Hazim Hassan; Iskandar Khairul Anuar (penalty missed); Jonathan Tan; IIlyas Lee (penalty missed)		Lincoln Fernando; Jorge Marco; Caio Rangel; (penalty missed) Ian Evans; Arlindo Neto

Fashah Rosedin (or Fashah Iskandar) was the most outstanding player that night against Flamengo. However, Caio Rangel and his other Samba football fellows brought the game to penalties where they won.

=== Lion City Cup: Under-15s journey (2011) ===
The Under-15 team, led by coach Dejan Gluscevic grabbed third, losing to eventual winners Flamengo U15 in the semi-finals by toppling Juventus U15 4–0 in the third place play-off.

==== Group stage ====
Team	Pld	W	D	L	GF	GA	GD	Pts
(Italy) Juventus U15	2	2	0	0	3	1	+2	6
Singapore U15	2	1	0	1	5	5	0	3
(England) Newcastle U15	2	0	0	2	3	5	−2	0

18 June 2011	Newcastle U-15 (England)	3–4	Singapore U-15	Jalan Besar Stadium, Singapore
18:00	James Atkinson 4'; Adam Armstrong 31'; Alex Gilliead 62'	Report	Zulfadhmi Suzliman 13'; Azhar Ramli 86'; Rifqi Yazid 90'; Faridzuan Fuad 90'	Attendance: NOT STATED

Their first group game, up against Newcastle United's U15 batch. Down 3–1, Singapore used just nine minutes to score 3 back and eventually win 4–3.

22 June 2011	Singapore U-15	1–2	(Italy) Juventus U-15	Jalan Besar Stadium, Singapore
18:00	Niccolo Guidicci 62' (o.g.)	Report	Andrea Marra 32'; Fabio Gili 85'	Attendance: 2,212

==== Semi-finals ====
24 June 2011	CR Flamengo U15 (Brazil)	3–0	Singapore U-15	Jalan Besar Stadium, Singapore
20:45	Jorge Marco 38'; Muhelmy Suhaimi 61' (o.g.); Caio Rangel 79'	Report		Attendance: 2,848

The Singapore U15s navigated past the group stage, leaving Newcastle U15 behind, and reaching to a clash with competition favourites Flamengo. Eventually, they lost 3–0.

==== Third-place play-off ====
26 June 2011	Juventus U-15 (Italy)	0–4	Singapore U-15	Jalan Besar Stadium, Singapore
18:00		Report	Irfan Iezran 26'; Azhar Ramli 63' 84' (pen.); Adam Swandi 68'	Attendance: 2,848

This match, along with the Singapore U16 semi-final with the same Italian opponents. The Italians were comprehensively beaten with the Under-15s clinching third place.

=== The AFF U-16 Championship (2011) ===
The U15 team, captained by Adam Swandi and coached by Dejan Gluscevic, took part at the AFF U-16 Championship, and finished in fourth place, winning 3 matches and losing 3 matches, including the semi-finals and the third place play-off. Adam Swandi scored five goals against Vietnam, the Philippines and Myanmar.

== Competition records ==
=== FIFA U-17 World Cup ===
FIFA U-17 World Cup record
Year	Round	PLD	W	D*	L	GS	GA
(China) 1985	did not qualify						
(Canada) 1987	did not qualify						
(Scotland) 1989	did not qualify						
(Italy) 1991	did not qualify						
(Japan) 1993	did not qualify						
(Ecuador) 1995	did not qualify						
(Egypt) 1997	did not qualify						
(New Zealand) 1999	did not qualify						
(Trinidad and Tobago) 2001	did not qualify						
(Finland) 2003	did not qualify						
(Peru) 2005	did not qualify						
(South Korea) 2007	did not qualify						
(Nigeria) 2009	did not qualify						
(Mexico) 2011	did not qualify						
(United Arab Emirates) 2013	did not qualify						
(Chile) 2015	did not qualify						
(India) 2017	did not qualify						
(Brazil) 2019	did not qualify						
(Indonesia) 2023	did not qualify						
(Qatar) 2025	did not qualify						
Total	0/20	-	-	-	-	-	-

=== AFC U-16 Championship ===
AFC U-16 Championship record								Qualifications					
Year	Round	PLD	W	D*	L	GS	GA	PLD	W	D	L	GS	GA
(Qatar) 1985	did not qualify							4	0	0	4	0	12
(Qatar) 1986	did not qualify							-	-	-	-	-	-
(Thailand) 1988	did not qualify							-	-	-	-	-	-
(United Arab Emirates) 1990	did not qualify							-	-	-	-	-	-
(Saudi Arabia) 1992	did not qualify							3	1	0	2	2	13
(Qatar) 1994	did not qualify							-	-	-	-	-	-
(Thailand) 1996	did not qualify							-	-	-	-	-	-
(Qatar) 1998	did not qualify							3	1	1	1	4	12
(Vietnam) 2000	did not qualify							3	1	0	2	14	12
(United Arab Emirates) 2002	did not qualify							2	0	0	2	0	9
(Japan) 2004	did not qualify							2	0	0	2	1	7
(Singapore) 2006	Group stage	3	0	2	1	2	4	-	-	-	-	-	-
(Uzbekistan) 2008	Group stage	3	0	0	3	1	14	4	3	0	1	17	3
(Uzbekistan) 2010	did not qualify							5	2	1	2	8	12
(Iran) 2012	did not qualify							4	1	1	2	10	6
(Thailand) 2014	did not qualify							4	2	0	2	14	8
(India) 2016	did not qualify							3	1	0	2	3	9
(Malaysia) 2018	did not qualify							3	1	0	2	10	18
(Thailand) 2023	did not qualify							3	1	0	2	2	8
Total	2/19	6	0	2	4	3	18	43	14	3	26	85	129

=== AFF Youth Championship (U-16) ===
Year	Group	Round	Position	GP	W	D*	L	GS	GA
(Malaysia) (Indonesia) 2002	U17 (2002 gen.)	Group stage	8th	4	1	1	2	11	11
(Thailand) 2005	U17 (2005 gen.)	did not participate							
(Vietnam) 2006	U17 (2006 gen.)	did not participate							
(Cambodia) 2007	U17 (2007 gen.)	Group stage	8th	3	0	1	2	3	9
(Indonesia) 2008	U16 (2008 gen.)	Group stage	4th	4	0	2	2	2	5
(Thailand) 2009	U16 (2009 gen.)	Cancelled							
(Indonesia) 2010	U16 (2010 gen.)	did not participate							
(Laos) 2011	U16 (2011 gen.)	Semi-finals	4th	6	3	0	3	16	5
(Laos) 2012	U16 (2012 gen.)	did not participate							
(Myanmar) 2013	U16 (2013 gen.)	Group stage	6th	4	1	2	1	6	6
(Indonesia) 2014	U16 (2014 gen.)	Cancelled							
(Cambodia) 2015	U16 (2015 gen.)	Group stage	6th	4	1	1	2	7	12
(Cambodia) 2016	U16 (2016 gen.)	Group stage	8th	5	1	0	4	6	16
(Thailand) 2017	U15 (2017 gen.)	Group stage	10th	5	0	0	5	0	16
(Indonesia) 2018	U16 (2018 gen.)	Group stage	8th	4	1	0	3	7	9
(Thailand) 2019	U15 (2019 gen.)	Group stage	8th	5	1	1	3	3	10
(Indonesia) 2022	U16 (2022 gen.)	Group stage	11th	3	0	0	3	2	16
Total		Semi-finals	4th Place	47	9	8	30	63	115

*Denotes draws including knockout matches decided on penalty kicks.
**Red border color indicates tournament was held on home soil.

== Recent results ==
=== 2025 ===
U17

22 November 2026 U17 Asian Cup Q	Singapore	0–6	Vietnam	Hưng Yên, Vietnam
19:00 UTC+7	Ayden Haziq (yellow card) 73'; Darwisy Johari (yellow card) 76'; Zharfan Zainal Abidin (yellow card) 78'; Aaryan Hermi (yellow card) 90+3'	Report	Lê Trọng Đại Nhân 4' (pen.); Lê Sỹ Bách 25'; Nguyễn Minh Thủy 38'; Chu Ngọc Nguyễn Lực 64'; Trần Mạnh Quân 68' (pen.), 89'; Duy Khang Truong Nguyen (yellow card) 80'	Stadium: PVF Stadium; Referee: Cllifford Daypuyat (Philippines)

24 November 2026 U17 Asian Cup Q	Singapore	1–1	Macau	Hanoi, Vietnam
19:00 UTC+7	Zharfan Zainal Abiddin 90'	Report	Chan U Chit 40'; Si Tou Chi Fung (yellow card) 62'; Fei-Ieong Alfie Ho (yellow card) 74'	Stadium: Vietnam YFTC Field No. 3 Referee: Daniel Cook (Australia)

26 November 2026 U17 Asian Cup Q	Singapore	2–1	Northern Mariana Islands	Hanoi, Vietnam
16:00 UTC+7	Aiman Eszuan 16'; Raoul Akbar 89'; Caleb Leo (yellow card) 56'	Report	Arstin Duenas Tagabuel 19'; David Xiong Xing (red card) 77'	Stadium: Vietnam YFTC Field No. 3 Referee: Ismaeel Fazal (Pakistan)

28 November 2026 U17 Asian Cup Q	Malaysia	2–1	Singapore	Hanoi, Vietnam
16:00 UTC+7	Iman Danish 5'; Arayyan Hakeem 44'	Report	Aaryan 75'	Stadium: Vietnam YFTC Field No. 3 Referee: Seo Dong-hwan (South Korea)

30 November 2026 U17 Asian Cup Q	Singapore	1–1	Hong Kong	Hanoi, Vietnam
19:00 UTC+7	Zharfan 72'	Report	Nigel Lau 7'	Stadium: Vietnam YFTC Field No. 3 Referee: Rustam Choriev (Uzbekistan)

=== 2026 ===
U17

7 February 2026 Friendly	JDT IV (Malaysia)	1–0	Singapore	Johor, Malaysia
--:-- UTC+8	Alif Hamzi 22'	Report

14 February 2026 Friendly	Singapore	0–0	United Arab Emirates	UAE
--:-- UTC+8		Report
Note: UAE training camp from 12 to 18 February

17 February 2026 Friendly	United Arab Emirates	2–0	Singapore	UAE
--:-- UTC+8		Report
Note: UAE training camp from 12 to 18 February

4 April 2026 Friendly	JDT IV (Malaysia)	2–0	Singapore	Johor, Malaysia
--:-- UTC+8	Tengku Hasyri 66'; Adam Mustaqim 79'	Report

11 April 2026 2026 ASEAN U17	Cambodia	0–0	Singapore	Surabaya, Indonesia
19:30 UTC+7		Report		Stadium: Gelora Delta Stadium; Referee: Izzul Fikri Kamaruzaman (Malaysia)

14 April 2026 2026 ASEAN U17	Australia	1–0	Singapore	Surabaya, Indonesia
19:30 UTC+7	Becvinovski 90+5'	Report		Stadium: Gelora Delta Stadium; Referee: Đỗ Khánh Nam (Vietnam)

17 April 2026 2026 ASEAN U17	Singapore	5–0	Brunei	Surabaya, Indonesia
15:30 UTC+7	Danish Abdul Hazin 30'; Aidan Irfan 39'; Gavriel Lai Keng Lum 54'; Aryan Sahib 55'; Ayden Haziq Syaifuallah 80'	Report		Stadium: Gelora Joko Samudro Stadium; Referee: John Mike Basinang (Philippines)

8 November 2026 2026 AFC U17 Qualifier	Guam	0–6	Singapore	Kuala Lumpur, Malaysia
19:30 UTC+7		Report	Barnhart 2' (pen.); Salas 5' (pen.); A. Irfan 20'; Lai Keng Lum 24'; Tan 45+1'; P. Irfan 46'	Stadium: Kuala Lumpur Stadium; Referee: Abdullah Zarban (Saudi Arabia)

11 November 2026 2026 AFC U17 Qualifier	Singapore	2–4	India	Kuala Lumpur, Malaysia
21:00 UTC+8	Izzan 26', 64'	Report	Gangte 29', 61' (pen.), 82'; Maity 88'	Stadium: Kuala Lumpur Stadium; Referee: Dan Ning (China)

14 November 2026 2026 AFC U17 Qualifier	Malaysia	2–1	Singapore	Kuala Lumpur, Malaysia
21:00 UTC+8	Syaifullah 32'; Fahim 88'	Report	I. Farid 45'	Stadium: Kuala Lumpur Stadium; Referee: Mohamed Jafran (Sri Lanka)

20 November 2026 2026 AFC U17 Qualifier	Palestine	2–3	Singapore	Kuala Lumpur, Malaysia
15:30 UTC+8	A. Irfan 2'; I. Farid 90+3'	Report	Abou-Atiq 29'; Hariri 40'; Sharifeh 48'	Stadium: Kuala Lumpur Stadium; Referee: Abdullah Zarban (Saudi Arabia)

U15

24 October 2026 2026 FIFA U-15 World Cup	Guatemala	1–0	Singapore	Baku, Azerbaijan
19:30 UTC+7				Stadium: Hovsan Competition Complex

25 October 2026 2026 FIFA U-15 World Cup	Honduras	3–0	Singapore	Baku, Azerbaijan
19:30 UTC+7				Stadium: Hovsan Competition Complex

25 October 2026 2026 FIFA U-15 World Cup	Canada	6–0	Singapore	Baku, Azerbaijan
19:30 UTC+7				Stadium: Hovsan Competition Complex

26 October 2026 2026 FIFA U-15 World Cup	American Samoa	0–12	Singapore	Baku, Azerbaijan
19:30 UTC+7				Stadium: Hovsan Competition Complex

26 October 2026 2026 FIFA U-15 World Cup	Guinea	6–0	Singapore	Baku, Azerbaijan
19:30 UTC+7				Stadium: Hovsan Competition Complex

27 October 2026 2026 FIFA U-15 World Cup	British Virgin Islands	0–9	Singapore	Baku, Azerbaijan
19:30 UTC+7				Stadium: Hovsan Competition Complex

27 October 2026 2026 FIFA U-15 World Cup	Bangladesh	1–1	Singapore	Baku, Azerbaijan
19:30 UTC+7				Stadium: Hovsan Competition Complex

28 October 2026 2026 FIFA U-15 World Cup	Hong Kong	7–0	Singapore	Baku, Azerbaijan
19:30 UTC+7				Stadium: Hovsan Competition Complex

28 October 2026 2026 FIFA U-15 World Cup	Saint Vincent and the Grenadines	3–8	Singapore	Baku, Azerbaijan
19:30 UTC+7				Stadium: Hovsan Competition Complex

29 October 2026 2026 FIFA U-15 World Cup	Eswatini	1–4	Singapore	Baku, Azerbaijan
19:30 UTC+7				Stadium: Hovsan Competition Complex

== Players ==
=== Current squad (U17) ===
These players are called up for the for 2026 AFC U17 Qualifier.

No.	Pos.	Player	Date of birth (age)	Caps	Goals	Club
	GK	Naqeeb Shawaluddin	23 August 2010 (age 16)	1	0	(Singapore) Lion City Sailors
	GK	Ilhan Hady	19 March 2010 (age 16)	4	0	(Singapore) Lion City Sailors
	GK	Safyn Sahar		0	0	(Singapore) Lion City Sailors
	DF	Caleb Leo	28 March 2010 (age 16)	2	0	(Singapore) Lion City Sailors
	DF	Joel Tan	8 December 2010 (age 15)	1	0	(Spain) DAV Santa Ana
	DF	Alessandro Mike Lura		0	0	(Singapore) Geylang International
	DF	Shlok Ranadive	10 June 2010 (age 16)	0	0	(Singapore) Lion City Sailors
	DF	Tyler Tan	7 July 2010 (age 16)	0	0	(Singapore) Lion City Sailors
	DF	Jacas Tjhai Jun Heo	5 January 2010 (age 16)	0	0	(Singapore) Lion City Sailors
	MF	Arfan Khafiz	15 June 2010 (age 16)	5	0	(Singapore) Tampines
	MF	Aufa Sutrisno		0	0	(Singapore) Lion City Sailors
	MF	Daniel Mehta		0	0	(Singapore) Lion City Sailors
	MF	Caden Pereira	3 February 2010 (age 16)	4	0	(Singapore) Lion City Sailors
	MF	Tan Yu Bin	13 October 2010 (age 16)	0	0	(Singapore) Lion City Sailors
	MF	Isaac Matthew Saw Tian Zhi	30 December 2010 (age 15)	0	0	(Singapore) Lion City Sailors
	MF	Aymann Aris		0	0	(Portugal) Sport Clube Salgueiros
	MF	Gavriel Lai Keng Lum		3	1	(Spain) Club Madrid City
	MF	Putera Irfan		0	0	(Singapore) Geylang International
	MF	Krishav Ram		0	0	(Portugal) Leixões U17
	FW	Rafael Mike Lura		0	0	(Singapore) Geylang International
	FW	Izzan Rifqi	4 March 2010 (age 16)	4	0	(Singapore) Lion City Sailors
	FW	Aidan Irfan	13 March 2010 (age 16)	2	1	(Spain) Club Madrid City

=== Recent call-ups ===
The list of players who were called up in the last 12 months.

Pos.	Player	Date of birth (age)	Caps	Goals	Club	Latest call-up
GK	Kenneth Ng	6 February 2009 (age 17)	0	0	(Singapore) Lion City Sailors U17	v.
GK	Evan Lee		0	0	(Singapore) Geylang International	v.
DF	Zaki Jumlan	27 September 2009 (age 17)	5	0	(Singapore) National Development Centre	v.
DF	Ayden Haziq Syaifuallah	27 September 2009 (age 17)	5	1	(Singapore) Young Lions U16	v.
DF	Mika Baihakki	24 April 2009 (age 17)	1		(Singapore) BG Tampines Rovers U17	v.Hong Kong, 13 July 2025
DF	Aaryan Azraqi Hermi	24 February 2009 (age 17)	5	0	(Singapore) Young Lions U16	v.
DF	Ariq Rizzuwan	16 March 2009 (age 17)	1		(Singapore) BG Tampines Rovers U17	v.Hong Kong, 13 July 2025
MF	Keanu Song		0	0	(Singapore) St Michael Soccer Academy	v.
MF	Jaden Han Ming Yan		0	0	(Singapore) St Michael Soccer Academy	v.
MF	Aiman Eszuan	1 December 2009 (age 16)	3	0	(Singapore) Young Lions U16	v.
MF	Erdy Thaqib	18 November 2009 (age 17)	5	0	Singapore Sports School	v.
MF	Farrel Farhan	15 March 2009 (age 17)	3	0	(Singapore) Young Lions U16	v.
MF	Angelo Joachim	1 December 2009 (age 16)	1	0	(Australia) Williams Landing	v.
MF	Adam Faizal	1 December 2009 (age 16)	3	0	(Singapore) Young Lions U16	v.
MF	Danish Abdul Hazin	6 May 2009 (age 17)	3	1	(Singapore) Young Lions U16	v.
MF	Chia Wayne Hon		0	0	(Singapore) Geylang International	v.
MF	Rayyan Razali		0	0	(Singapore) Geylang International	v.
MF	Raoul Hadid		3	0	(Singapore) Geylang International	v.
FW	Lukyan Tan	3 May 2009 (age 17)	3	0	(Singapore) Young Lions U16	v. Hong Kong, 13 July 2025
FW	Aryan Sahib	12 September 2009 (age 17)	2	1	(Singapore) Young Lions U16	v.
FW	Varghese Ethan		2	0	(Singapore) Lion City Sailors U17	v.
FW	Jamus Low Yu Wei		0	0	(Singapore) St Michael Soccer Academy	v.

=== Current squad (U16) ===
These players are called up for the Lion City Cup 2025.

No.	Pos.	Player	Date of birth (age)	Caps	Goals	Club
	GK	Ilhan Hady	19 March 2010 (age 16)	0	0	(Singapore) Lion City Sailors U17
	GK	Luthfi Naqeeb Syazani	23 August 2010 (age 16)	0	0	(Singapore) Lion City Sailors U17
	GK	Haziq Amiruddin		0	0	(Singapore) BG Tampines Rovers U17
	DF	Aiman Eszuan	1 December 2009 (age 16)	0	0	(Singapore) Lion City Sailors U17
	DF	Ayden Haziq Syaifullah	27 September 2009 (age 17)	0	0	(Singapore) Lion City Sailors U17
	DF	Aaryan Azraqi Hermi	24 February 2009 (age 17)	0	0	(Singapore) Lion City Sailors U17
	DF	Jacas Tjhai Jun Heo	5 January 2010 (age 16)	0	0	(Singapore) Lion City Sailors U17
	DF	Mika Baihakki	23 April 2009 (age 17)	0	0	(Singapore) BG Tampines Rovers U17
	DF	Ariq Rizzuwan		0	0	(Singapore) National Development Centre
	DF	Zamir Zamri		0	0	(Singapore) National Development Centre
	DF	Joel Tan		0	0	(Spain) Atletico Chopera Alcobendas
	DF	Miguel García		0	0	(Spain) Rayo Alcobendas
	MF	Zaki Jumlan		0	0	(Singapore) National Development Centre
	MF	Erdy Taha		0	0	(Singapore) National Development Centre
	MF	Adam Faisal	1 December 2009 (age 16)	0	0	(Singapore) Lion City Sailors U17
	MF	Darwisy Fitri Johari	18 February 2009 (age 17)	0	0	(Singapore) Lion City Sailors U17
	MF	Arfan Khafiz		0	0	(Singapore) BG Tampines Rovers U17
	FW	Darius Lai	15 January 2009 (age 17)	0	0	(Japan) Albirex Niigata (S) U21
	FW	Farrel Farhan		0	0	(Singapore) Lion City Sailors U17
	FW	Izzan Farid		0	0	(Singapore) Lion City Sailors U17
	FW	Danish Irfan Abdul Hazin	6 May 2009 (age 17)	0	0	(Singapore) Lion City Sailors U17
	FW	Aryan Sahib	12 September 2009 (age 17)	0	0	(Singapore) Lion City Sailors U17
	FW	Vedant Raj	12 September 2009 (age 17)	0	0	(Singapore) Geylang International U17
	FW	Aidan Irfan		0	0	(Spain) Global Pro Camps
	FW	Lukyan Tan		0	0	(Spain) Atletico Chopera

=== Recent call-ups ===
The list of players who were called up in the last 36 months.

Pos.	Player	Date of birth (age)	Caps	Goals	Club	Latest call-up
GK	Noor Aydrin	25 March 2008 (age 18)	0	0	(Singapore) Tampines Rovers U17	v.
GK	Jarec Ng	25 January 2008 (age 18)	0	0	(Singapore) Lion City Sailors U17	v.
DF	Zaki Jumlan				(Singapore) ActiveSG	v.
DF	Ahmad Martin Roslan	5 August 2008 (age 18)	0	0	(Singapore) Albirex Niigata (S) U21	v.
DF	Rauf Anaqi	8 June 2008 (age 18)	0	0	(Japan) Albirex Niigata (S) U21	v.
DF	Luth Harith	19 March 2008 (age 18)	0	0	(Singapore) Lion City Sailors U21	v.
DF	Ahmad Ilhan Rizqullah	17 September 2008 (age 18)	0		(Singapore) Lion City Sailors U21	v.
DF	Iliya Naufal	6 July 2008 (age 18)	0	0	(Singapore) Lion City Sailors U21	v.
DF	Shafrel Ariel	6 April 2008 (age 18)	0	0	(Singapore) Geylang International U21	v.
MF	Jaden Heng	10 November 2008 (age 18)			(Singapore) ActiveSG	v.
MF	Aqif Ariyan Saifuddin	25 February 2008 (age 18)	0	0	(Japan) Albirex Niigata (S) U21	v.
MF	Sarrvin Raj	5 April 2008 (age 18)	0	0	(Singapore) Lion City Sailors U21	v.
MF	Andy Reefqy	14 July 2008 (age 18)	2	1	(Singapore) Lion City Sailors U21	v.
MF	Harith Danish Irwan	27 November 2008 (age 17)	0	0	(Singapore) Lion City Sailors U21	v.
MF	Rae Peh Jun Wen	15 September 2008 (age 18)	0	0	(Singapore) Lion City Sailors U21	v.
MF	Erdy Thaqib		0	0	Singapore Sports School	v.
MF	Nyqil Iyyan	26 June 2008 (age 18)	0	0	(Singapore) Young Lions FC	v.
FW	Muhammad Helmi Shahrol	31 July 2008 (age 18)	1	1	(Japan) Albirex Niigata (S) U21	v.
FW	Uchenna Eziakor	17 May 2008 (age 18)	0	0	(Singapore) Lion City Sailors U21	v.
FW	Jadon Quah	20 April 2008 (age 18)	0	0	(Singapore) Lion City Sailors U17	v.

=== Current squad (U15) ===
These players are called up for the Lion City Cup 2023.

No.	Pos.	Player	Date of birth (age)	Caps	Goals	Club
1	GK	Noor Aydrin	25 March 2008 (age 18)	0	0	Singapore Sports School
28	GK	Jarec Ng	25 January 2008 (age 18)	0	0	Singapore Sports School
3	DF	Luth Harith	19 March 2008 (age 18)	0	0	(Singapore) Lion City Sailors U21
4	DF	Ahmad Ilhan Rizqullah	17 September 2008 (age 18)	0		(Singapore) Lion City Sailors U17
5	DF	Iliya Naufal	6 July 2008 (age 18)	0	0	Singapore Sports School
12	DF	Kieran Tan	1 January 2008 (age 18)	0	0	(Singapore) Lion City Sailors U17
14	DF	Shafrel Ariel	6 April 2008 (age 18)	0	0	Singapore Sports School
15	DF	Dani Qalish	20 May 2008 (age 18)	0	0	(Singapore) Lion City Sailors U17
16	DF	Damien Chiow	1 March 2008 (age 18)	0	0	(Singapore) Geylang International U15
21	DF	Ahmad Martin Roslan	5 August 2008 (age 18)	0	0	Singapore Sports School
6	MF	Andy Reefqy	14 July 2008 (age 18)	2	1	(Singapore) Lion City Sailors U17
8	MF	Uday Ghoshal	9 January 2008 (age 18)	0	0	(Singapore) Tanjong Pagar U17
10	MF	Harith Danish Irwan	27 November 2008 (age 17)	0	0	Singapore Sports School
17	MF	Jaden Heng	10 November 2008 (age 18)	41	33	(Singapore) ActiveSG
18	MF	Nyqil Iyyan	26 June 2008 (age 18)	0	0	Singapore Sports School
19	MF	Rae Peh Jun Wen	15 September 2008 (age 18)	0	0	(Singapore) Lion City Sailors U21
7	FW	Aqif Ariyan Saifuddin	25 February 2008 (age 18)	0	0	(Japan) Albirex Niigata (S) U17
9	FW	Muhammad Helmi Shahrol	31 July 2008 (age 18)	1	1	(Japan) Albirex Niigata (S) U17
11	FW	Uchenna Eziakor	17 May 2008 (age 18)	0	0	(Singapore) Lion City Sailors U17
20	FW	Nathan Mao Zhi Xuan	26 March 2008 (age 18)	1	2	(Singapore) Lion City Sailors U21
23	FW	Sarrvin Raj	5 April 2008 (age 18)	0	0	(Singapore) Lion City Sailors U17
24	FW	Jadon Quah	20 April 2008 (age 18)	0	0	(Singapore) Lion City Sailors U17
	FW	Kyen Sasikumar		0	0	(Spain) Atlético Madrid Youth Academy
	FW	Edan Kei McCulloch		0	0	(Spain) Rayo Alcobendas

== Coaching staff ==
Position	Name
Team manager	(Singapore) Kevin Huang
Head coach	(Singapore) Ashraf Ariffin
Assistant Coach(es)	(Singapore) Azlan Alipah
Assistant Coach(es)	(Singapore) Kanan Vedhamuthu
Assistant Coach(es)	(Australia) Kevin Staples
Assistant Coach(es)	(Singapore) Firdaus Mohamed
Goalkeeper Coach	(Singapore) Hyrulnizam Juma’at
Tactical Coach	(Australia) Jack Paliouras
Match Analyst	(Singapore) Daniel Lau
Match Analyst	(Australia) Matt Stevens
Head Football Science and Medicine	(Australia) Brian Willey
Fitness Coach	(Bosnia and Herzegovina) Dževad Šarić
Senior Sports Trainer	(Singapore) Nasruldin Baharuddin
Sports Trainer	(Singapore) Muhammad Fazly Bin Hasan (Singapore) Fazly Hasan
Masseur	(Singapore) Gurnaya Singh
Sports Scientist	(Singapore) Faizal Khalid Abdul Aziz
Lead Physiotherapist	(Singapore) Nurhafizah Abu Sujad
Kit Manager	(Singapore) Omar Mohd
Media Officer	(Singapore) Chia Pui San

== Player History ==
=== Captains ===
Note: Stand-in captain – Stood in when captain was absent (applies only for a standing in for at least 3 games in a row.)
The role of vice-captain does not apply here. Only caps and goals earned during captaincy are considered here.

==== Under-16s ====
No.	Pos.	Name	Type	Years in captaincy	Caps	Goals
5	DF	Jeffrey Lightfoot	Captain	2010	4	1
16	DF	Dhukhilan Jeevamani	Stand-in captain	2011	4	0

==== Under-15s ====
No.	Pos.	Name	Type	Years in captaincy	Caps	Goals
10	MF	Adam Swandi	Captain	2011	10	6

== Coach statistics ==
Note: Do note that all results are counted at the end of the final whistle, or a.e.t. if there is extra time. Matches with a penalty shoot-out outcome are still counted as a draw. Win PSO means the number of drawn games won via penalties, and the Win PSO (%) is the percentage of winning via penalties.

=== Under 16s ===
Name	Reign	Games	Wins	Draws	Losses	Wins (PSO)	Win (%)	Win PSO (%)
Kadir Yahaya	2010	4	3	0	1	0	75	0
Takuma Koga	2011	4	0	4	0	1	0	50

=== Under 15s ===
Name	Reign	Games	Wins	Draws	Losses	Wins (PSO)	Win (%)	Win PSO (%)
Dejan Gluscevic	2011	10	5	0	5	0	50	0

== Stadium ==
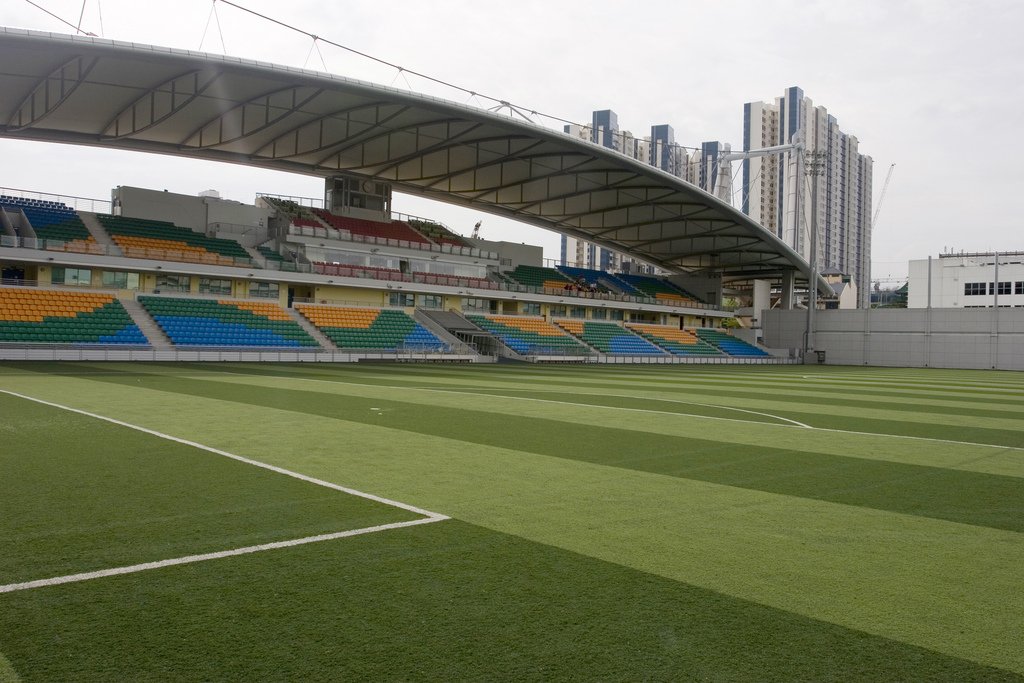
The Jalan Besar stadium

The youth team uses the Jalan Besar Stadium, sharing it temporarily with the senior team before the senior team moves to Singapore Sports Hub when it has finished construction.

== See also ==
- Singapore national football team
- Football Association of Singapore
- Jalan Besar Stadium

== Head-to-head record ==
The following table shows Singapore's head-to-head record in the AFC U-17 Asian Cup.

Opponent	Pld	W	D	L	GF	GA	GD	Win %
Bahrain	1	0	0	1	0	3	−3	0.00
Iran	1	0	0	1	1	4	−3	0.00
Japan	1	0	1	0	1	1	+0	0.00
Nepal	1	0	1	0	0	0	+0	0.00
South Korea	1	0	0	1	1	3	−2	0.00
Uzbekistan	1	0	0	1	0	7	−7	0.00
Total	6	0	2	4	3	18	−15	0.00
