= Maki Kitahara =

Japanese footballer (born 2009)

Maki Kitahara 北原 槙
Personal information
- Date of birth: 7 July 2009 (age 17)
- Place of birth: Suginami, Tokyo, Japan
- Height: 1.74 m (5 ft 9 in)
- Position: Midfielder

Team information
- Current team: Fujieda MYFC (on loan from FC Tokyo)
- Number: 77

Youth career
- –2021: JACPA Tokyo FC
- 2022–: FC Tokyo

Senior career*
Years	Team	Apps	(Gls)
2025–	FC Tokyo	7	(0)
2026–	→ Fujieda MYFC (loan)	1	(0)

International career^{‡}
2024–2025	Japan U15	6	(0)
2026–	Japan U17	7	(6)
- * Club domestic league appearances and goals as of 13 August 2026 ‡ National team caps and goals as of 21:30, 19 May 2026 (UTC)

Maki Kitahara (北原 槙, Kitahara Maki; born 7 July 2009) is a Japanese professional footballer who plays as a forward for Fujieda MYFC, on loan from the J1 League club FC Tokyo.

== Club career ==
A youth product of JACPA Tokyo FC, Kitahara undergoes his development with FC Tokyo. In June 2024, he was promoted to FC Tokyo's U-18 squad despite being a third-grade junior high schooler at the time. On 14 February 2025, he was registered with FC Tokyo's senior team as a Type 2 player. He made his senior and professional debut with FC Tokyo as a substitute in a 2–0 J1 League loss to Kashima Antlers on 1 March 2025. Aged 15 years, 7 months, and 22 days, he was the youngest ever debutant in the history of the J1 League, taking the record from Takayuki Morimoto.

== International career ==
In May 2024, Kitahara was called up to the Japan U15s for a set of friendlies at the age of 14.

== Honours ==
Japan U17

- AFC U-17 Asian Cup: 2026

Individual

- AFC U-17 Asian Cup Best Player: 2026
- AFC U-17 Asian Cup Top Scorer: 2026
