= 2026 AFC U-17 Asian Cup =

كٲس اسيا تحت 17 سنة

Tournament details
- Host country: Saudi Arabia
- Dates: 5–22 May 2026
- Teams: 15 (from 1 confederation)
- Venues: 4 (in 1 host city)

Final positions
- Champions: Japan (5th title)
- Runners-up: China

Tournament statistics
- Matches played: 28
- Goals scored: 91 (3.25 per match)
- Attendance: 4,392 (157 per match)
- Top scorer(s): (Japan) Maki Kitahara (6 goals)
- Best player: (Japan) Maki Kitahara
- Best goalkeeper: (Japan) Kosei Oshita
- Fair play award: Saudi Arabia

The 2026 AFC U-17 Asian Cup was the 21st edition of the AFC U-17 Asian Cup (including previous editions of the AFC U-17 Championship and AFC U-16 Championship), the annual international youth association football championship organised by the Asian Football Confederation (AFC) for the men's under-17 national teams of Asia. It was the second of four consecutive U-17 Asian Cups held in Saudi Arabia from 2025 to 2028.

The top eight teams of the tournament qualified for the 2026 FIFA U-17 World Cup in Qatar as the AFC representatives. Uzbekistan were the defending champions, having won their second title in 2025. They were eliminated in the semi-finals by eventual winners Japan.

== Qualification ==
The host country of the 2025 FIFA U-17 World Cup (Qatar) and the top eight teams of the 2025 U-17 Asian Cup (including hosts Saudi Arabia) qualified automatically, while the other seven teams were decided by qualification. There was one round of qualification matches, which was held between 22–30 November 2025.

=== Qualified teams ===
The following teams qualified for the tournament. Initially, North Korea also qualified, but withdrew due to concerns related to the 2026 Iran war, leaving the tournament at 15 teams.

Team	Qualification method	Date of qualification	Appearance(s)			Previous best performance (Note: Bold text indicates they hosted that edition.)
Team	Qualification method	Date of qualification	Total	First	Last	Previous best performance
Saudi Arabia	Hosts	24 May 2024	13th	1985	2025	**Champions** (1985, 1988)
Indonesia	AFC teams at the 2025 FIFA U-17 World Cup	5 August 2025	8th	1986	2025	Fourth place (1990)
Japan	AFC teams at the 2025 FIFA U-17 World Cup	5 August 2025	18th	1985	2025	**Champions** (1994, 2006, 2018, 2023)
Qatar	AFC teams at the 2025 FIFA U-17 World Cup	5 August 2025	12th	1985	2023	**Champions** (1990)
South Korea	AFC teams at the 2025 FIFA U-17 World Cup	5 August 2025	17th	1986	2025	**Champions** (1986, 2002)
Tajikistan	AFC teams at the 2025 FIFA U-17 World Cup	5 August 2025	6th	2006	2025	Runners-up (2018)
United Arab Emirates	AFC teams at the 2025 FIFA U-17 World Cup	5 August 2025	9th	1990	2025	Runners-up (**1990**)
Uzbekistan	AFC teams at the 2025 FIFA U-17 World Cup	5 August 2025	12th	1994	2025	**Champions** (2012, 2025)
China	Group A winners	30 November 2025	17th	1985	2025	**Champions** (1992, 2004)
Yemen	Group B winners	30 November 2025	9th	2002	2025	Runners-up (2002)
Vietnam	Group C winners	30 November 2025	10th	2000	2025	Fourth place (2000)
India	Group D winners	30 November 2025	10th	1990	2023	Quarter-finalists (2002, 2018)
Australia	Group E winners	30 November 2025	9th	2008	2025	Semi-finalists (2010, 2014, 2018)
Thailand	Group F winners	30 November 2025	14th	1985	2025	**Champions** (1998)
Myanmar	Group G winners	30 November 2025	5th	1986	2006	Group stage (1986, 2000, 2002, 2006)

== Venues ==
The tournament is held in the following venues in Jeddah.

Jeddah		Location of the host cities of the 2026 AFC U-17 Asian Cup.
King Abdullah Sports City Hall Stadium	King Abdullah Sports City Training Stadium (Pitch A)	Location of the host cities of the 2026 AFC U-17 Asian Cup.
Capacity: 1,000	Capacity: TBC	Location of the host cities of the 2026 AFC U-17 Asian Cup.
King Abdullah Sports City Training Stadium (Pitch B)	King Abdullah Sports City Training Stadium (Pitch C)	Location of the host cities of the 2026 AFC U-17 Asian Cup.
Capacity: TBC	Capacity: TBC	Location of the host cities of the 2026 AFC U-17 Asian Cup.

== Draw ==
The draw took place in Kuala Lumpur, Malaysia on 12 February 2026 at 15:00 MST (UTC+8).

The 16 teams were placed into four groups of four teams, with seeding based on their performance in the previous three editions of the tournament (2018, 2023, and 2025). As hosts, Saudi Arabia were ranked as the top seeded team.

Pot 1	Pot 2	Pot 3	Pot 4
1. Saudi Arabia (hosts); 2. South Korea; 3. Japan; 4. Uzbekistan	5. Tajikistan; 6. Australia; 7. Yemen; 8. Indonesia	9. Thailand; 10. China; 11. Vietnam; 12. India	13. ~~North Korea~~ (W); 14. United Arab Emirates; 15. Qatar; 16. Myanmar

== Match officials ==
The following referees and assistant referees were appointed for the tournament.

Referees

- (Australia) Adam Kersey
- (Belgium) Lothar D'hondt
- (China) Du Jianxin
- (India) Harish Kundu
- (Kuwait) Saud Al-Samhan
- (Kyrgyzstan) Veronika Bernatskaia
- (Oman) Yahya Al-Balushi
- (Saudi Arabia) Abdullah Al-Shehri
- (Singapore) Clarence Leow
- (Thailand) Wiwat Jumpao-on
- (United Arab Emirates) Sultan Al-Hammadi
- (Uzbekistan) Akobir Shukurullaev

Assistant referees

- (Australia) Owen Goldrick
- (Australia) Bradley Wright
- (Belgium) Romain Devillers
- (China) Tang Chao
- (India) Arun Pillai
- (Kuwait) Saud Al-Rashedi
- (Kyrgyzstan) Ramina Tsoi
- (Oman) Mohammed Al-Ghazali
- (Oman) Hamooh Al-Shuaibi
- (Saudi Arabia) Omar Al-Jamal
- (Saudi Arabia) Saad Al-Subaie
- (Singapore) Andy Tan
- (Thailand) Pattarapong Kijsathit
- (United Arab Emirates) Ali Rashid Al-Nuaimi
- (Uzbekistan) Islom Azimov
- (Uzbekistan) Alisher Usmanov

== Squads ==
Players born between 1 January 2009 and 31 December 2011 were eligible to compete in the tournament. Each team had to register a squad of minimum 18 players and maximum 23 players, minimum three of whom must have been goalkeepers (Regulations Articles 21.3).

== Group stage ==
The group winners and runners-up advanced to the quarter-finals and qualified for both the 2026 FIFA U-17 World Cup and the 2027 AFC U-17 Asian Cup. Had Qatar (who automatically qualified for the 2026 FIFA U-17 World Cup as hosts) advanced to the quarter-finals, the best third-placed team would have also qualified for the FIFA U-17 World Cup.

Tiebreakers

Teams were ranked according to points (3 points for a win, 1 point for a draw, 0 points for a loss), and if tied on points, the following tie-breaking criteria were applied, in the order given, to determine the rankings:

1. Points in head-to-head matches among tied teams;
2. Goal difference in head-to-head matches among tied teams;
3. Goals scored in head-to-head matches among tied teams;
4. If more than two teams were tied, and after applying all head-to-head criteria above, a subset of teams were still tied, all head-to-head criteria above were reapplied exclusively to this subset of teams;
5. Goal difference in all group matches;
6. Goals scored in all group matches;
7. Penalty shoot-out if only two teams were tied and they met in the last round of the group;
8. Disciplinary points (yellow card = 1 point, red card as a result of two yellow cards = 3 points, direct red card = 3 points, yellow card followed by direct red card = 4 points);
9. Drawing of lots.

All times are local, SAST (UTC+3).

=== Group A ===
Pos	Team	Pld	W	D	L	GF	GA	GD	Pts	Qualification
1	Saudi Arabia	3	2	1	0	11	5	+6	7	Knockout stage and FIFA U-17 World Cup
2	Tajikistan	3	2	1	0	8	5	+3	7	Knockout stage and FIFA U-17 World Cup
3	Thailand	3	0	1	2	2	6	−4	1	
4	Myanmar	3	0	1	2	2	7	−5	1	

Source: AFC
Rules for classification: Group stage tiebreakers
5 May 2026
20:00

Saudi Arabia	4–0	Myanmar
Makki 3', 23'; Bu Shaqraa 58'; Al-Dawsari 74' (pen.)	Report

King Abdullah Sports City Hall Stadium, Jeddah
Attendance: 150
Referee: Akobir Shukurullaev (Uzbekistan)
5 May 2026
20:30

Tajikistan	2–0	Thailand
Phetcharayut 1' (o.g.); Sanginov 90+7'	Report

King Abdullah Sports City Training Stadium (Pitch B), Jeddah
Attendance: 25
Referee: Yahya Al-Balushi (Oman)

9 May 2026
20:00

Thailand	0–2	Saudi Arabia
	Report	Al-Yami 4'; Al-Okrush 90+2'

King Abdullah Sports City Hall Stadium, Jeddah
Attendance: 150
Referee: Clarence Leow (Singapore)
9 May 2026
20:30

Myanmar	0–1	Tajikistan
	Report	Makhtumov 28'

King Abdullah Sports City Training Stadium (Pitch B), Jeddah
Attendance: 37
Referee: Saud Al-Samhan (Kuwait)

12 May 2026
20:00

Saudi Arabia	5–5	Tajikistan
Saeed 13'; Al-Shamrani 18', 33' (pen.); Al-Buri 39'; Bayomi 54'	Report	Anvarzod 27', 49'; Makhtumov 44'; Sanginov 83'; Mirakhmadov 90+7'

King Abdullah Sports City Hall Stadium, Jeddah
Attendance: 125
Referee: Lothar D'hondt (Belgium)
12 May 2026
20:00

Thailand	2–2	Myanmar
Pakorn 30'; Gabert 75'	Report	Sai Myat Min 19', 22'

King Abdullah Sports City Training Stadium (Pitch B), Jeddah
Attendance: 73
Referee: Veronika Bernatskaia (Kyrgyzstan)

=== Group B ===
Pos	Team	Pld	W	D	L	GF	GA	GD	Pts	Qualification
1	Japan	3	3	0	0	8	3	+5	9	Knockout stage and FIFA U-17 World Cup
2	China	3	1	0	2	3	3	0	3 (Note: Head-to-head points: China 3, Qatar 3, Indonesia 3. Head-to-head goal differences: China +1, Qatar 0, Indonesia –1.)	Knockout stage and FIFA U-17 World Cup
3	Qatar	3	1	0	2	3	5	−2	3	FIFA U-17 World Cup
4	Indonesia	3	1	0	2	2	5	−3	3	

Source: AFC
Rules for classification: Group stage tiebreakers
Notes:
5 May 2026
19:00

Japan	3–1	Qatar
Saito 51'; Kitahara 70', 76'	Report	Tokode 25'

King Abdullah Sports City Training Stadium (Pitch C), Jeddah
Attendance: 100
Referee: Wiwat Jumpao-on (Thailand)
5 May 2026
19:30

Indonesia	1–0	China
Keanu 87'	Report

King Abdullah Sports City Training Stadium (Pitch A), Jeddah
Attendance: 330
Referee: Abdullah Al-Shehri (Saudi Arabia)

9 May 2026
19:00

China	1–2	Japan
Zhao Songyuan 48'	Report	Motosuna 37'; Kitahara 60'

King Abdullah Sports City Training Stadium (Pitch C), Jeddah
Attendance: 200
Referee: Sultan Al-Hammadi (United Arab Emirates)
9 May 2026
19:30

Qatar	2–0	Indonesia
Tokode 57'; Larbi 66'	Report

King Abdullah Sports City Training Stadium (Pitch A), Jeddah
Attendance: 267
Referee: Veronika Bernatskaia (Kyrgyzstan)

12 May 2026
19:00

Japan	3–1	Indonesia
Tsuneyoshi 28'; Wada 59'; Okamoto 71'	Report	Tjoe 70'

King Abdullah Sports City Training Stadium (Pitch A), Jeddah
Attendance: 268
Referee: Harish Kundu (India)
12 May 2026
19:00

China	2–0	Qatar
He Sifan 14'; Zhang Bolin 71'	Report

King Abdullah Sports City Training Stadium (Pitch C), Jeddah
Attendance: 200
Referee: Adam Kersey (Australia)

=== Group C ===
Pos	Team	Pld	W	D	L	GF	GA	GD	Pts	Qualification
1	Vietnam	3	2	0	1	5	6	−1	6	Knockout stage and FIFA U-17 World Cup
2	South Korea	3	1	2	0	5	2	+3	5	Knockout stage and FIFA U-17 World Cup
3	Yemen	3	1	1	1	3	3	0	4	
4	United Arab Emirates	3	0	1	2	5	7	−2	1	

Source: AFC
Rules for classification: Group stage tiebreakers
6 May 2026
20:00

Yemen	0–1	Vietnam
	Report	Đậu Quang Hưng 77'

King Abdullah Sports City Hall Stadium, Jeddah
Attendance: 312
Referee: Harish Kundu (India)
6 May 2026
20:30

South Korea	1–1	United Arab Emirates
Ahn Joo-wan 88'	Report	Al-Jneibi 8'

King Abdullah Sports City Training Stadium (Pitch B), Jeddah
Attendance: 100
Referee: Adam Kersey (Australia)

10 May 2026
19:00

Vietnam	1–4	South Korea
Lê Sỹ Bách 33'	Report	An Sun-hyun 84'; Ian Nam 86'; Ahn Joo-wan 88'; Kim Ji-woo 90+4'

King Abdullah Sports City Training Stadium (Pitch C), Jeddah
Attendance: 100
Referee: Du Jianxin (China)
10 May 2026
19:30

United Arab Emirates	2–3	Yemen
H. Ali 25'; Al-Meri 62'	Report	Al-Maghdi 49'; Basheer 53' (pen.); Sadeq 85'

King Abdullah Sports City Training Stadium (Pitch A), Jeddah
Attendance: 90
Referee: Akobir Shukurullaev (Uzbekistan)

13 May 2026
20:00

South Korea	0–0	Yemen
	Report

King Abdullah Sports City Training Stadium (Pitch B), Jeddah
Attendance: 252
Referee: Saud Al-Samhan (Kuwait)
13 May 2026
20:00

Vietnam	3–2	United Arab Emirates
Chu Ngọc Nguyễn Lực 41'; Nguyễn Minh Thủy 48'; Nguyễn Mạnh Cường 69'	Report	Al-Mheiri 1'; Mahrous 56'

King Abdullah Sports City Hall Stadium, Jeddah
Attendance: 92
Referee: Wiwat Jumpao-on (Thailand)

=== Group D ===
Pos	Team	Pld	W	D	L	GF	GA	GD	Pts	Qualification
1	Uzbekistan	2	2	0	0	5	0	+5	6	Knockout stage and FIFA U-17 World Cup
2	Australia	2	1	0	1	4	2	+2	3	Knockout stage and FIFA U-17 World Cup
3	India	2	0	0	2	0	7	−7	0	
4	North Korea	0	0	0	0	0	0	0	0	Withdrew

Source: AFC
Rules for classification: Group stage tiebreakers
6 May 2026
19:00

Australia	4–0	India
Becvinovski 4'; Court 29' (pen.); Demuth 74'; Oliveira 86'	Report

King Abdullah Sports City Training Stadium (Pitch C), Jeddah
Attendance: 72
Referee: Lothar D'hondt (Belgium)
6 May 2026
19:30

Uzbekistan	Cancelled	North Korea

King Abdullah Sports City Training Stadium (Pitch A), Jeddah

10 May 2026
20:00

India	0–3	Uzbekistan
	Report	Abduraimov 32' (pen.); Wangkhem 60' (o.g.); Ravshanbekov 78'

King Abdullah Sports City Hall Stadium, Jeddah
Attendance: 58
Referee: Abdullah Al-Shehri (Saudi Arabia)
10 May 2026
20:30

North Korea	Cancelled	Australia

King Abdullah Sports City Training Stadium (Pitch B), Jeddah

13 May 2026
19:00

Uzbekistan	2–0	Australia
Murodov 28'; Ravshanbekov 45'	Report

King Abdullah Sports City Training Stadium (Pitch A), Jeddah
Attendance: 23
Referee: Yahya Al-Balushi (Oman)
13 May 2026
19:00

India	Cancelled	North Korea

King Abdullah Sports City Training Stadium (Pitch C), Jeddah

== Knockout stage ==
All eight teams that reached the knockout stage qualified for the 2026 FIFA U-17 World Cup.

In the knockout stage, no extra time was played, with a penalty shoot-out used to decide the winners where necessary.

=== Bracket ===
Quarter-finals
15 May – Jeddah (Pitch A)
Saudi Arabia	1
China	3
16 May – Jeddah (Pitch A)
Vietnam	0
Australia	3
15 May – Jeddah (Pitch C)
Japan	5
Tajikistan	0
16 May – Jeddah (Pitch C)
Uzbekistan (p)	2 (5)
South Korea	2 (3)

Semi-finals
19 May – Jeddah (Hall)
China	2
Australia	0
19 May – Jeddah (Hall)
Japan (p)	1 (3)
Uzbekistan	1 (2)

Final
22 May – Jeddah (Hall)
China	2
Japan	3

=== Quarter-finals ===
15 May 2026
19:00

Japan	5–0	Tajikistan
Kitahara 42', 60'; Saito 69'; Satomi 79'; Khodzhiev 90' (o.g.)	Report

King Abdullah Sports City Training Stadium (Pitch C), Jeddah
Attendance: 75
Referee: Abdullah Al-Shehri (Saudi Arabia)

15 May 2026
20:00

Saudi Arabia	1–3	China
Bayomi 21'	Report	Wan Xiang 27'; Zhao Songyuan 59'; He Sifan 90+2'

King Abdullah Sports City Training Stadium (Pitch A), Jeddah
Attendance: 306
Referee: Akobir Shukurullaev (Uzbekistan)

16 May 2026
19:00

Uzbekistan	2–2	South Korea
Ravshanbekov 41', 45+2'	Report	Moon Ji-hwan 22'; An Sun-hyun 88'
Penalties
Khakimov (penalty scored); Anvarov (penalty scored); Abdusoliev (penalty scored); Mamatov (penalty scored); Erkinov (penalty scored)	5–3	(penalty scored) Jung Ha-won; (penalty scored) Kim Ji-ho; (penalty scored) Ahn Joo-wan; (penalty missed) Park Kyung-hoon

King Abdullah Sports City Training Stadium (Pitch C), Jeddah
Attendance: 81
Referee: Du Jianxin (China)

16 May 2026
20:00

Vietnam	0–3	Australia
	Report	O'Carroll 40'; Hassarati 60'; Gerald 75'

King Abdullah Sports City Training Stadium (Pitch A), Jeddah
Attendance: 25
Referee: Sultan Al-Hammadi (United Arab Emirates)

=== Semi-finals ===
19 May 2026
18:00

Japan	1–1	Uzbekistan
Ezemuokwe 90+7'	Report	Aliev 28' (pen.)
Penalties
Kitahara (penalty scored); Iwatsuchi (penalty scored); Wada (penalty missed); Satomi (penalty missed); Motosuna (penalty scored)	3–2	(penalty missed) Khakimov; (penalty missed) Anvarov; (penalty missed) Abdusoliev; (penalty scored) Orifkhonov; (penalty scored) Abduraimov

King Abdullah Sports City Hall Stadium, Jeddah
Attendance: 80
Referee: Harish Kundu (India)

19 May 2026
21:30

China	2–0	Australia
Shuai Weihao 49'; Xie Jin 90'	Report

King Abdullah Sports City Hall Stadium, Jeddah
Attendance: 306
Referee: Abdullah Al-Shehri (Saudi Arabia)

=== Final ===
22 May 2026
20:00

China	2–3	Japan
Wan Xiang 48'; Zhao Songyuan 79' (pen.)	Report	Satomi 31'; Saito 42'; Kitahara 45+2'

King Abdullah Sports City Hall Stadium, Jeddah
Attendance: 495
Referee: Sultan Al-Hammadi (United Arab Emirates)

== Awards ==
The following awards were given at the conclusion of the tournament:

Top goalscorer	Most Valuable Player	Best Goalkeeper	Fair Play award
(Japan) Maki Kitahara (6 goals)	(Japan) Maki Kitahara	(Japan) Kosei Oshita	Saudi Arabia

== Goalscorers ==
There were 91 goals scored in 28 matches, for an average of 3.25 goals per match.

6 goals

- (Japan) Maki Kitahara

4 goals

- (Uzbekistan) Akhrorbek Ravshanbekov

3 goals

- (China) Zhao Songyuan
- (Japan) Kakeru Saito

2 goals

- (China) He Sifan
- (China) Wan Xiang
- (Japan) Tafuku Satomi
- (Myanmar) Sai Myat Min
- (Qatar) Ayokunle Samuel Tokode
- (Saudi Arabia) Ali Al-Shamrani
- (Saudi Arabia) Faisal Bayomi
- (Saudi Arabia) Ali Makki
- (South Korea) Ahn Joo-wan
- (South Korea) An Sun-hyun
- (Tajikistan) Munavar Anvarzod
- (Tajikistan) Asadbek Makhtumov
- (Tajikistan) Parviz Sanginov

1 goal

- (Australia) Luke Becvinovski
- (Australia) Max Court
- (Australia) Luka Demuth
- (Australia) Akeem Gerald
- (Australia) Georgio Hassarati
- (Australia) Oliver O'Carroll
- (Australia) Henrique Oliveira
- (China) Shuai Weihao
- (China) Xie Jin
- (China) Zhang Bolin
- (Indonesia) Keanu Senjaya
- (Indonesia) Peres Tjoe
- (Japan) Chimezie Kai Ezemuokwe
- (Japan) Anthony Motosuna
- (Japan) Arata Okamoto
- (Japan) Ryoma Tsuneyoshi
- (Japan) Takeshi Wada
- (Qatar) Dhiaeddine Larbi
- (Saudi Arabia) Abdullah Al-Dawsari
- (Saudi Arabia) Zaid Al-Buri
- (Saudi Arabia) Hassan Al-Okrush
- (Saudi Arabia) Marwan Al-Yami
- (Saudi Arabia) Faris Bu Shaqraa
- (Saudi Arabia) Yahya Saeed
- (South Korea) Moon Ji-hwan
- (South Korea) Kim Ji-woo
- (South Korea) Ian Nam
- (Tajikistan) Mukhammadzhon Mirakhmadov
- (Thailand) David Gabert
- (Thailand) Pakorn Suttiprapa
- (United Arab Emirates) Butti Al-Jneibi
- (United Arab Emirates) Abdulla Al-Meri
- (United Arab Emirates) Sultan Al-Mheiri
- (United Arab Emirates) Hussain Ali
- (United Arab Emirates) Adam Mahrous
- (Uzbekistan) Asilbek Aliev
- (Uzbekistan) Laziz Abduraimov
- (Uzbekistan) Mirkomil Murodov
- (Vietnam) Chu Ngọc Nguyễn Lực
- (Vietnam) Đậu Quang Hưng
- (Vietnam) Lê Sỹ Bách
- (Vietnam) Nguyễn Mạnh Cường
- (Vietnam) Nguyễn Minh Thủy
- (Yemen) Ali Al-Maghdi
- (Yemen) Sailan Basheer
- (Yemen) Mohammed Sadeq

1 own goal

- (India) Denny Singh Wangkhem (against Uzbekistan)
- (Tajikistan) Islomdzhon Khodzhiev (against Japan)
- (Thailand) Phetcharayut Soboonma (against Tajikistan)

== Qualified teams for FIFA U-17 World Cup ==
The following nine teams from AFC qualified for the 2026 FIFA U-17 World Cup in Qatar; Qatar automatically qualified as the hosts.

The teams also got a bye to the 2027 AFC U-17 Asian Cup.

Team	Qualified on	Previous appearances in FIFA U-17 World Cup^{1}
Qatar	14 March 2024	7 (1985, 1987, 1991, 1993, 1995, 1999, 2005, 2025)
Saudi Arabia	9 May 2026	4 (1985, 1987, **1989**, 2025)
Tajikistan	9 May 2026	3 (2007, 2019, 2025)
Uzbekistan	10 May 2026	4 (2011, 2013, 2023, 2025)
Australia	10 May 2026	13 (1985, 1987, 1989, 1991, 1993, 1995, 1999, 2001, 2003, 2011, 2015, 2019)
Japan	12 May 2026	11 (1993, 1995, 2001, 2007, 2009, 2011, 2013, 2017, 2019, 2023, 2025)
China	12 May 2026	6 (1985, 1989, 1991, 1993, 2003, 2005)
Vietnam	13 May 2026	0 (debut)
South Korea	13 May 2026	8 (1987, 2003, 2007, 2009, 2015, 2019, 2023, 2025)

^{1} Bold indicates champions for that year. Italic indicates hosts for that year.
