= Mukhammad Khakimov =

Uzbekistani footballer (born 2009)

Personal information
- Date of birth: October 4, 2009 (age 17)
- Place of birth: Yangiyer, Uzbekistan
- Height: 1.88 m (6 ft 2 in)
- Position: Centre-back

Team information
- Current team: Bunyodkor
- Number: 72

Youth career
- —2025: Bunyodkor

Senior career*
| Years | Team | Apps | (Gls) |
| 2025 | Pakhtakor | 13 | (3) |
| 2025— | Bunyodkor | 13 | (0) |

International career^{‡}
| 2025– | Uzbekistan U16 | 8 | (1) |
| 2026- | Uzbekistan | 1 | (0) |
- * Club domestic league appearances and goals as of 18 October 2026 ‡ National team caps and goals as of 18 October 2026

Mukhammad Khakimov (Uzbek: Muhammad Hakimov; born 4 October 2009) is an Uzbekistani professional footballer who plays as a centre-back for Uzbekistan Super League club Bunyodkor and Uzbekistan national team.

== Club career ==
On 1 July 2026, Khakimov officially signed his first professional contract with Bunyodkor's senior team, committing to the club through 31 December 2027. He made his Uzbekistan Super League debut during the second half of the 2026 season.

== International career ==
Khakimov represented Uzbekistan at the youth level, featuring prominently during the 2025 AFC U-17 Asian Cup, where Uzbekistan emerged as champions.

In October 2026, around his 16th birthday, Khakimov received his first call-up to senior Uzbekistan national team and subsequently made his senior international debut.

== Career Statistics ==
=== International ===
Nematov made his debut for the Uzbekistan main team on 1 October 2026 in a friendly match against Syria.

Uzbekistan national team
| Year | Apps | Goals |
|---|---|---|
| 2026 | 1 | 0 |
| Total | 1 | 0 |

Statistics accurate as of match played 1 October 2026.

== Honours ==
Uzbekistan U17

- AFC U-17 Asian Cup Champions: 2025
