= 2025 AFC U-17 Asian Cup qualification =

International football tournament

Tournament details
- Host countries: Jordan (Group A); Cambodia (Group B); China (Group C); Thailand (Group D); Chinese Taipei (Group E); Qatar (Group F); Kuwait (Group G); Laos (Group H); Vietnam (Group I); Singapore (Group J)
- Dates: 19–27 October 2024
- Teams: 43 (from 1 confederation)

Tournament statistics
- Matches played: 69
- Goals scored: 386 (5.59 per match)
- Top scorer(s): (Tajikistan) Muhammad Nazriev (16 goals)

The 2025 AFC U-17 Asian Cup qualification was an international men's under-17 football competition which was held to decide the participating teams of the 2025 AFC U-17 Asian Cup.

== Draw ==
Of the 47 Asian Football Confederation (AFC) member associations, a total of 44 teams entered the competition. Saudi Arabia as the hosts of the final tournament did not participate.

The draw was held on 13 June 2024 at Kuala Lumpur, Malaysia at 14:00 local time (UTC+8).

The 43 teams were allocated to three groups of five teams and seven groups of four teams, with teams seeded according to their performance in the 2023 AFC U-17 Asian Cup final tournament and qualification (overall ranking shown in parentheses; NR stands for non-ranked teams). A further restriction was also applied, with the ten teams serving as qualification group hosts drawn into separate groups.

Pot 1	Pot 2	Pot 3	Pot 4	Pot 5
1. **Japan** (1); 2. **South Korea** (2); 3. **Uzbekistan** (3); 4. **Iran** (4); 5. **Yemen** (6); 6. **Australia** (7); 7. **Thailand** (8) **(H)**; 8. Malaysia (9); 9. **Afghanistan** (10); 10. **Tajikistan** (11)	11. India (12); 12. **China** (13) **(H)**; 13. **Vietnam** (14) **(H)**; 14. Qatar (15) **(H)**; 15. Laos (16) **(H)**; 16. **Indonesia** (17); 17. Bangladesh (18); 18. **Oman** (19); 19. Jordan (20) **(H)**; 20. Iraq (21)	21. Syria (22); 22. **United Arab Emirates** (23); 23. Kuwait (24) **(H)**; 24. Kyrgyzstan (25); 25. Chinese Taipei (26) **(H)**; 26. Singapore (27) **(H)**; 27. Mongolia (28); 28. Cambodia (29) **(H)**; 29. Brunei (30); 30. Bahrain (31)	31. Turkmenistan (32); 32. Palestine (33); 33. Nepal (34); 34. Myanmar (35); 35. Bhutan (36); 36. Hong Kong (37); 37. Northern Mariana Islands (38); 38. Lebanon (39) **(W)**; 39. Guam (40); 40. Philippines (41)	41. Maldives (42); 42. **North Korea** (NR); 43. Macau (NR)

Notes

- Teams in **bold** qualified for the final tournament.
- (H): Qualification group hosts
- (W): Withdrew after draw

Did not enter
- Timor-Leste
- Pakistan
- Sri Lanka

== Player eligibility ==
Players born on or after 1 January 2008 were eligible to compete in the tournament.

== Schedule ==
The matches were played between 19 and 27 October 2024.

—N/a	Group A-C		Group D-G, I, J		Group H	
—N/a	Date	Matches	Date	Matches	Date	Matches
Matchday 1	19 October 2024	3 v 2; 5 v 4	23 October 2024	1 v 4; 2 v 3	23 October 2024	3 v 1
Matchday 2	21 October 2024	4 v 1; 5 v 3	25 October 2024	4 v 2; 3 v 1	25 October 2024	2 v 3
Matchday 3	23 October 2024	1 v 5; 2 v 4	27 October 2024	1 v 2; 3 v 4	27 October 2024	1 v 2
Matchday 4	25 October 2024	2 v 5; 3 v 1	—N/a			
Matchday 5	27 October 2024	4 v 3; 1 v 2	—N/a			

== Groups ==
In each group, teams played each other once at a centralised venue.

The ten group winners and the five best runners-up qualified for the final tournament.

Tiebreakers
Teams were ranked according to points (3 points for a win, 1 point for a draw, and 0 points for a loss), and if tied on points, the following tiebreaking criteria were applied, in the order given, to determine the rankings (Regulations Article 7.3):
1. Points in head-to-head matches among tied teams;
2. Goal difference in head-to-head matches among tied teams;
3. Goals scored in head-to-head matches among tied teams;
4. If more than two teams were tied, and after applying all head-to-head criteria above, a subset of teams were still tied, all head-to-head criteria above were reapplied exclusively to this subset of teams;
5. Goal difference in all group matches;
6. Goals scored in all group matches;
7. Penalty shoot-out if only two teams were tied and they met in the last round of the group;
8. Disciplinary points (yellow card = 1 point, red card as a result of two yellow cards = 3 points, direct red card = 3 points, yellow card followed by direct red card = 4 points);
9. Drawing of lots.

=== Group A ===
- All matches were held in Jordan.
- Times listed are UTC+3.

Pos	Team	Pld	W	D	L	GF	GA	GD	Pts	Qualification
1	North Korea	4	4	0	0	17	4	+13	12	Final tournament
2	Iran	4	3	0	1	13	7	+6	9	Final tournament
3	Hong Kong	4	2	0	2	7	17	−10	6	
4	Syria	4	1	0	3	5	6	−1	3	
5	Jordan (H)	4	0	0	4	4	12	−8	0	

Source: AFC
Rules for classification: Qualification tiebreakers
(H) Hosts
19 October 2024
17:00

Syria	3–1	Jordan
Al-Sarraj 50'; Dinawi 55'; Al-Hariri 75' (pen.)	Report	Al-Qasem 90+5' (pen.)

Prince Mohammed Stadium, Zarqa
Attendance: 193
Referee: Abdullah Al Shehri (Saudi Arabia)
19 October 2024
21:00

North Korea	8–2	Hong Kong
Pak Kwang-song 3'; Kim Yu-jin 8', 71'; Ri Kang-rim 14', 38', 58'; Ri Tae-myong 66'; Ri Ro-gwon 90'	Report	Yiu Tsz Leong 19'; Cheung Yiu Hin 90+5'

Prince Mohammed Stadium, Zarqa
Attendance: 27
Referee: Umesh Bidari (Nepal)

21 October 2024
17:00

Hong Kong	1–7	Iran
Yiu Tsz Leong 23'	Report	Garachchomaghloo 2', 50', 88', 90+2'; Khodadadian 16', 84'; Ahmadimanesh 32'

Prince Mohammed Stadium, Zarqa
Attendance: 20
Referee: Mohamed Jafran (Sri Lanka)
21 October 2024
21:00

North Korea	2–1	Syria
Kim Tae-guk 68'; Kim Yu-jin 83'	Report	Khalaf 71'

Prince Mohammed Stadium, Zarqa
Attendance: 162
Referee: Hussain Al-Showaikh (Bahrain)

23 October 2024
17:00

Jordan	1–2	Hong Kong
Al-Qasem 33' (pen.)	Report	Cheung Yiu Hin 4'; Wong Yat Hin 17'

Prince Mohammed Stadium, Zarqa
Attendance: 210
Referee: Baraa Abusarris (Palestine)
23 October 2024
21:00

Iran	1–4	North Korea
Khodadadian 90+5'	Report	Ri Kang-rim 22'; Kim Yu-jin 51'; Choe Song-hun 76' (pen.); Pak Kwang-song 90'

Prince Mohammed Stadium, Zarqa
Attendance: 10
Referee: Abdullah Al-Shehri (Saudi Arabia)

25 October 2024
17:00

Jordan	0–3	North Korea
	Report	An Jin-sok 42'; Choe Song-hun 59' (pen.); Kim Yu-jin 74'

Prince Mohammed Stadium, Zarqa
Attendance: 100
Referee: Mohamed Jafran (Sri Lanka)
25 October 2024
21:00

Syria	0–1	Iran
	Report	Alipour 20'

Prince Mohammed Stadium, Zarqa
Attendance: 300
Referee: Baraa Abusarris (Palestine)

27 October 2024
17:00

Iran	4–2	Jordan
Al-Qasem 15' (o.g.); Kazemirekabdarkolaei 70'; Ghafarifouzi 76'; Aghamohammadi 90+3' (pen.)	Report	Amro 37'; Aburomeh 39'

Prince Mohammed Stadium, Zarqa
Attendance: 120
Referee: Hussain Al-Showaikh (Bahrain)
27 October 2024
21:00

Hong Kong	2–1	Syria
Hui Siu Chung 65'; Jeffery Chin Yu-Ho 88'	Report	Dinawi 64'

Prince Mohammed Stadium, Zarqa
Attendance: 100
Referee: Umesh Bidari (Nepal)

=== Group B ===
- All matches were held in Cambodia.
- Times listed are UTC+7.

Pos	Team	Pld	W	D	L	GF	GA	GD	Pts	Qualification
1	Afghanistan	4	4	0	0	23	3	+20	12	Final tournament
2	Philippines	4	2	0	2	9	9	0	6 (Note: Head-to-head points: Philippines 3, Bangladesh 3, Cambodia 3. Head-to-head goal difference: Philippines +1, Bangladesh 0, Cambodia –1)	
3	Bangladesh	4	2	0	2	10	4	+6	6	
4	Cambodia (H)	4	2	0	2	3	5	−2	6	
5	Macau	4	0	0	4	0	24	−24	0	

Source: AFC
Rules for classification: Qualification tiebreakers
(H) Hosts
Notes:
19 October 2024
16:00

Macau	0–7	Philippines
	Report	Edvard Omitade 34'; Matthew Steen 37' (pen.); Anthony Moutzouris 43' (pen.); Spencer Webster 54'; Joshua Moleje 78'; Sambher Abrenica 85'; Amann 86'

Olympic Stadium, Phnom Penh
Attendance: 258
Referee: Veronika Bernatskaya (Kyrgyzstan)
19 October 2024
19:00

Cambodia	1–0	Bangladesh
Daro 85'	Report

Olympic Stadium, Phnom Penh
Attendance: 4,166
Referee: Ali Hussein Doshi (Iraq)

21 October 2024
16:00

Philippines	0–8	Afghanistan
	Report	Waris Shirzai 6', 40'; Ahmadi 57', 67'; Safi 62'; Mahbobi 74'; Ibrahimi 81'; Sarwari 90+4' (pen.)

Olympic Stadium, Phnom Penh
Attendance: 468
Referee: Chuang En-yir (Chinese Taipei)
21 October 2024
19:00

Macau	0–1	Cambodia
	Report	Pimakara 15'

Olympic Stadium, Phnom Penh
Attendance: 3,109
Referee: Ali Al Ashkar (Lebanon)

23 October 2024
16:00

Afghanistan	9–0	Macau
Nowrozi 7'; Waris Shirzai 27', 56'; Ahmadi 49'; Sarwari 54'; Chen Chia Yeh 60' (o.g.); Mahbobi 79'; Waris Raziqi 90'; Safi 90+2'	Report

Olympic Stadium, Phnom Penh
Attendance: 50
Referee: Sila Jinnigorn (Thailand)
23 October 2024
19:00

Bangladesh	1–0	Philippines
Shofiq Rahman 17'	Report

Olympic Stadium, Phnom Penh
Attendance: 120
Referee: Veronika Bernatskaya (Kyrgyzstan)

25 October 2024
16:00

Bangladesh	7–0	Macau
Nazmul Faysal 39', 74', 81', 82'; Manik 65'; Lei Weng Chong 70' (o.g.); Tang Tin 72' (o.g.)	Report

Prince Stadium, Phnom Penh
Attendance: 636
Referee: Chuang En-yir (Chinese Taipei)
25 October 2024
19:00

Cambodia	1–3	Afghanistan
Sakakibara 90+4'	Report	Safi 45'; Waris Shirzai 73'; Ahmadi 90'

Prince Stadium, Phnom Penh
Attendance: 3,894
Referee: Sila Jinnigorn (Thailand)

27 October 2024
16:00

Afghanistan	3–2	Bangladesh
Safi 30'; Milad Noori 63'; Ahmadi 70'	Report	Mithu Chowdhury 6'; Murshed Ali 45+1'

Prince Stadium, Phnom Penh
Attendance: 720
Referee: Ali Al Ashkar (Lebanon)
27 October 2024
19:00

Philippines	2–0	Cambodia
Spencer Webster 3', 43'	Report

Prince Stadium, Phnom Penh
Attendance: 2,315
Referee: Ali Hussein Doshi (Iraq)

=== Group C ===
- All matches were held in China.
- Times listed are UTC+8.

Pos	Team	Pld	W	D	L	GF	GA	GD	Pts	Qualification
1	South Korea	4	3	1	0	22	2	+20	10	Final tournament
2	China (H)	4	3	1	0	19	2	+17	10	Final tournament
3	Bahrain	4	2	0	2	2	4	−2	6	
4	Bhutan	4	0	1	3	2	14	−12	1	
5	Maldives	4	0	1	3	2	25	−23	1	

Source: AFC
Rules for classification: Qualification tiebreakers
(H) Hosts
19 October 2024
15:30

Maldives	2–2	Bhutan
Mohamed Imran 70', 81' (pen.)	Report	Lama 50'; Yezer 62'

Dalian Football Youth Training Base, Dalian
Attendance: 20
Referee: Senthilnathan Sekaran (India)
19 October 2024
19:35

Bahrain	0–2	China
	Report	Hebibilla 2'; Bian Yulang 60'

Puwan Stadium, Dalian
Attendance: 238
Referee: Firdavs Norsafarov (Uzbekistan)

21 October 2024
15:30

Maldives	0–1	Bahrain
	Report	Ebrahim Ayash 83'

Puwan Stadium, Dalian
Attendance: 20
Referee: Suhail Al-Mulla (United Arab Emirates)
21 October 2024
19:35

Bhutan	0–5	South Korea
	Report	Lee Su-yoon 8'; Lee Sang-yeon 15' (pen.); Jun Min-seong 21' (pen.), 67'; Oh Ha-ram 35'

Dalian Football Youth Training Base, Dalian
Attendance: 27
Referee: Clarence Leow (Singapore)

23 October 2024
15:30

China	6–0	Bhutan
Wei Xiangxin 34'; Hebibilla 47', 60'; Li Xiang 49', 90+5'; Yang Qiandong 90+4'	Report

Puwan Stadium, Dalian
Attendance: 166
Referee: Suhail Al-Mulla (United Arab Emirates)
23 October 2024
19:35

South Korea	13–0	Maldives
Jun Min-seung 26'; Lee Ji-ho 28'; Kim Eun-seong 34'; Kim Ji-sung 35', 43', 67'; Kim Min-chan 48'; Lim Ye-chan 72', 84'; Lee Sang-yeon 82'; Park Byeong-chan 87', 90+1', 90+5'	Report

Dalian Football Youth Training Base, Dalian
Attendance: 30
Referee: Senthilnathan Sekaran (India)

25 October 2024
15:30

China	9–0	Maldives
Yang Qiandong 5', 24', 66'; Wen Zhanlin 47'; Zhang Chengrui 63'; Abdulsalam 65'; Wei Xiangxin 77', 80'; Bian Yulang 85'	Report

Puwan Stadium, Dalian
Attendance: 180
Referee: Wael Haidar (Lebanon)
25 October 2024
19:35

Bahrain	0–2	South Korea
	Report	Lee Su-yoon 37' (pen.); Lee Ji-ho 64'

Dalian Football Youth Training Base, Dalian
Attendance: 55
Referee: Clarence Leow (Singapore)

27 October 2024
15:30

Bhutan	0–1	Bahrain
	Report	A. Bassam 51' (pen.)

Dalian Football Youth Training Base, Dalian
Attendance: 8
Referee: Wael Haidar (Lebanon)
27 October 2024
19:35

South Korea	2–2	China
Jun Min-seung 8'; Lee Ji-ho 87' (pen.)	Report	Yao Junyu 44'; Wei Xiangxin 66' (pen.)

Puwan Stadium, Dalian
Attendance: 488
Referee: Firdavs Norsafarov (Uzbekistan)

=== Group D ===
- All matches were held in Thailand.
- Times listed are UTC+7.

Pos	Team	Pld	W	D	L	GF	GA	GD	Pts	Qualification
1	Thailand (H)	3	3	0	0	24	2	+22	9	Final tournament
2	India	3	2	0	1	16	3	+13	6	
3	Turkmenistan	3	1	0	2	10	3	+7	3	
4	Brunei	3	0	0	3	0	42	−42	0	

Source: AFC
Rules for classification: Qualification tiebreakers
(H) Hosts
23 October 2024
16:00

India	13–0	Brunei
Yadav 8', 29', 52'; Arbash 24' (pen.); Lairenjam 38'; Kaif 41'; Mate 64'; Malngiang 73'; Lunkim 81'; A. Shah 84'; Muhammad Sami 86'; Sumit Sharma 88'; Usham Singh 90+4'	Report

Chonburi Stadium, Chonburi
Attendance: 70
Referee: Mederbek Taychiev (Kyrgyzstan)
23 October 2024
20:00

Thailand	2–0	Turkmenistan
La-ongdee 57'; Ponsan 88'	Report

Chonburi Stadium, Chonburi
Attendance: 949
Referee: Tareq Ahmed (Iraq)

25 October 2024
16:00

Turkmenistan	0–1	India
	Report	Rishi Singh 44'

Chonburi Stadium, Chonburi
Attendance: 10
Referee: Hamid Siri (Iran)
25 October 2024
20:00

Brunei	0–19	Thailand
	Report	Phuengkuson 11', 38'; Larsawat 12', 29', 48', 52'; Wan-on 19', 47'; Sahanunchaichid 30'; Jongketkorn 39', 49'; Srilang 58', 89'; Homboonma 70', 80', 90+2'; Chephankhung 71', 77', 86'

Chonburi Stadium, Chonburi
Attendance: 868
Referee: Dong Fangyu (China)

27 October 2024
16:00

Brunei	0–10	Turkmenistan
	Report	Gowşudow 18', 32', 37', 51', 66', 73'; Meredow 39'; Wepaýew 53', 90+3'; Oräzdurdyýew 59'

Chonburi Stadium, Chonburi
Attendance: 76
Referee: Đỗ Khánh Nam (Vietnam)
27 October 2024
20:00

Thailand	3–2	India
Ponsan 35', 60'; Ngernma 86'	Report	Mate 34' (pen.); Yadav 42'

Chonburi Stadium, Chonburi
Attendance: 1,730
Referee: Hamed Siri (Iran)

=== Group E ===
- All matches were held in Chinese Taipei (Taiwan).
- Times listed are UTC+8.

Pos	Team	Pld	W	D	L	GF	GA	GD	Pts	Qualification
1	Uzbekistan	3	3	0	0	5	0	+5	9	Final tournament
2	Iraq	3	2	0	1	9	1	+8	6	
3	Palestine	3	1	0	2	2	7	−5	3	
4	Chinese Taipei (H)	3	0	0	3	0	8	−8	0	

Source: AFC
Rules for classification: Qualification tiebreakers
(H) Hosts
23 October 2024
14:00

Uzbekistan	3–0	Palestine
Bakhodirkhonov 11'; Sarsenbaev 47'; Khasanov 77'	Report

Fu Jen Catholic University Stadium, New Taipei City
Attendance: 35
Referee: Mohammed Al-Mazyed (Qatar)
23 October 2024
18:30

Iraq	5–0	Chinese Taipei
Jassim 37', 45+3'; M. Al-Saedi 56'; Al-Talebi 77'; Ameer Hasan 84'	Report

Fu Jen Catholic University Stadium, New Taipei City
Attendance: 388
Referee: Zaheer Hussain (Maldives)

25 October 2024
14:00

Palestine	0–4	Iraq
	Report	Ameer Hasan 15', 90+6'; Alridha Al-Lami 64'; K. Al-Saedi 90'

Fu Jen Catholic University Stadium, New Taipei City
Attendance: 33
Referee: Nur Amali Ihsanuddin (Malaysia)
25 October 2024
18:30

Chinese Taipei	0–1	Uzbekistan
	Report	Shukurullaev 61'

Fu Jen Catholic University Stadium, New Taipei City
Attendance: 284
Referee: Gholamreza Adibi (Iran)

27 October 2024
14:00

Uzbekistan	1–0	Iraq
Sarsenbaev 59'	Report

Fu Jen Catholic University Stadium, New Taipei City
Attendance: 36
Referee: Nur Amali Ihsanuddin (Malaysia)
27 October 2024
18:30

Chinese Taipei	0–2	Palestine
	Report	Abudeiab 52', 90+4'

Fu Jen Catholic University Stadium, New Taipei City
Attendance: 480
Referee: Khash-Erdene Bold (Mongolia)

=== Group F ===
- All matches were held in Qatar.
- Times listed are UTC+3.

Pos	Team	Pld	W	D	L	GF	GA	GD	Pts	Qualification
1	Japan	3	3	0	0	21	2	+19	9	Final tournament
2	Qatar (H)	3	2	0	1	7	5	+2	6	
3	Mongolia	3	1	0	2	1	9	−8	3	
4	Nepal	3	0	0	3	2	15	−13	0	

Source: AFC
Rules for classification: Qualification tiebreakers
(H) Hosts
23 October 2024
17:45

Qatar	2–0	Mongolia
Zaid Ktit 18', 83'	Report

Aspire Academy Pitch 7, Doha
Attendance: 348
Referee: Ahmed Imam (Kuwait)
23 October 2024
19:45

Japan	9–2	Nepal
Tani 17', 38', 43', 61'; Asada 19', 45+2', 64'; Kasai 73'; Chonan 77'	Report	Sabin Kumar 11'; Khadka 88'

Hamad bin Khalifa Stadium, Doha
Attendance: 80
Referee: Aditya Purkayastha (India)

25 October 2024
17:45

Nepal	0–5	Qatar
	Report	Yazan Mohamed 20'; Zaid Ktit 45', 55', 82'; Omar Al-Marzouqi 66'

Aspire Academy Pitch 7, Doha
Attendance: 200
Referee: Sanzhar Zhakypbekov (Kyrgyzstan)
25 October 2024
19:45

Mongolia	0–7	Japan
	Report	Kawabata 10', 46'; Baasanjav 41' (o.g.); Kasai 55'; Asada 74', 88'; Tani 83'

Hamad bin Khalifa Stadium, Doha
Attendance: 84
Referee: Saif Al Messabi (United Arab Emirates)

27 October 2024
17:45

Mongolia	1–0	Nepal
Soyol 78'	Report

Hamad bin Khalifa Stadium, Doha
Attendance: 45
Referee: Aditya Purkayastha (India)
27 October 2024
17:45

Japan	5–0	Qatar
Imai 3'; Tani 52'; Seifeldin Hassanein 55' (o.g.); Seguchi 68'; Asada 86'	Report

Aspire Academy Pitch 7, Doha
Attendance: 368
Referee: Abdullo Davlatov (Tajikistan)

=== Group G ===
- All matches were held in Kuwait.
- Times listed are UTC+3.

Pos	Team	Pld	W	D	L	GF	GA	GD	Pts	Qualification
1	Australia	3	2	1	0	22	1	+21	7	Final tournament
2	Indonesia	3	2	1	0	11	0	+11	7	Final tournament
3	Kuwait (H)	3	1	0	2	10	4	+6	3	
4	Northern Mariana Islands	3	0	0	3	0	38	−38	0	

Source: AFC
Rules for classification: Qualification tiebreakers
(H) Hosts
23 October 2024
17:30

Indonesia	1–0	Kuwait
Baker 8'	Report

Abdullah Alkhalifa Alsabah Stadium, Mishref
Attendance: 475
Referee: Ammar Abo Alo (Syria)
23 October 2024
20:30

Australia	19–0	Northern Mariana Islands
Tatu 4', 17'; Garbowski 11', 31'; MacNicol 18', 24', 70'; Didulica 25', 26', 38', 45+1', 58'; Anastasio 35', 49', 83'; Alfaro 37'; Maltz 60'; Naylor 69', 84'	Report

Abdullah Alkhalifa Alsabah Stadium, Mishref
Attendance: 34
Referee: Khalid Khallufah Al Ahmari (Saudi Arabia)

25 October 2024
17:30

Northern Mariana Islands	0–10	Indonesia
	Report	Gholy 2', 9'; Aldyansyah 16', 24'; Evandra 21'; Gelgel 23', 42'; Cahya 69'; Daniel 88'; Alberto 90+1'

Abdullah Alkhalifa Alsabah Stadium, Mishref
Attendance: 648
Referee: Mahmoud Ahmad Mazin Alsawalmeh (Jordan)
25 October 2024
20:30

Kuwait	1–3	Australia
Al-Suwaidi 90+7'	Report	Tatu 21'; Charlie Parkin 85'; MacNicol 90+5'

Abdullah Alkhalifa Alsabah Stadium, Mishref
Attendance: 300
Referee: Seyit Doolotkeldi uulu (Kyrgyzstan)

27 October 2024
17:30

Australia	0–0	Indonesia
	Report

Abdullah Alkhalifa Alsabah Stadium, Mishref
Attendance: 200
Referee: Khalid Khallufah Al Ahmari (Saudi Arabia)
27 October 2024
20:30

Kuwait	9–0	Northern Mariana Islands
Abdullah Al-Qarzaei 7', 30', 40', 71'; Fawaz Al-Dawood 32', 78'; Al-Suwaidi 38'; Mubarak Al-Ajmi 57'; Ahmed Mesyer 90+2'	Report

Abdullah Alkhalifa Alsabah Stadium, Mishref
Attendance: 85
Referee: Mohammed Abdulhakim Ba-saleh (Yemen)

=== Group H ===
- All matches were held in Laos.
- Times listed are UTC+7.

Pos	Team	Pld	W	D	L	GF	GA	GD	Pts	Qualification
1	United Arab Emirates	2	2	0	0	7	2	+5	6	Final tournament
2	Malaysia	2	0	1	1	2	4	−2	1	
3	Laos (H)	2	0	1	1	4	7	−3	1	
4	Lebanon	0	0	0	0	0	0	0	0	Withdrawn (Note: Lebanon withdrew on 16 October 2024.)

Source: AFC
Rules for classification: Qualification tiebreakers
(H) Hosts
Notes:
23 October 2024
19:00

United Arab Emirates	2–0	Malaysia
Mayed Khamis 7'; B. Al-Marar 45+5' (pen.)	Report

New Laos National Stadium, Vientiane
Attendance: 265
Referee: Mahmoud Al-Sbaih (Kuwait)

25 October 2024
19:00

Laos	2–5	United Arab Emirates
Siphanom 50', 56' (pen.)	Report	Mayed Khamis 12'; Faisal Al-Breiki 29'; ฺB. Al-Marar 51'; Al-Suwaidi 89'; Mounkanyah 90+2' (o.g.)

New Laos National Stadium, Vientiane
Attendance: 1,907
Referee: Lakmal Weerakkody (Sri Lanka)

27 October 2024
19:00

Malaysia	2–2	Laos
Arayyan Hakeem 11'; Naqif Firhad 66'	Report	Phettakounh 21'; Siphanom 33' (pen.)

New Laos National Stadium, Vientiane
Attendance: 2,273
Referee: Ibrokhim Ismoilov (Uzbekistan)

=== Group I ===
- All matches were held in Vietnam.
- Times listed are UTC+7.

Pos	Team	Pld	W	D	L	GF	GA	GD	Pts	Qualification
1	Yemen	3	2	1	0	10	4	+6	7	Final tournament
2	Vietnam (H)	3	1	2	0	3	1	+2	5	Final tournament
3	Myanmar	3	1	0	2	3	9	−6	3	
4	Kyrgyzstan	3	0	1	2	3	5	−2	1	

Source: AFC
Rules for classification: Qualification tiebreakers
(H) Hosts
23 October 2024
16:00

Yemen	6–1	Myanmar
Wahib Al-Garash 5', 59'; Obaid Al-Sakkaf 12'; Ahmed Mohyam 46'; Karem Abdulatef 63'; Htet Kyaw Shine 75' (o.g.)	Report	Thura Min Thant 70'

Việt Trì Stadium, Phú Thọ
Attendance: 268
Referee: Amirjon Khorkashev (Tajikistan)
23 October 2024
19:00

Vietnam	0–0	Kyrgyzstan
	Report

Việt Trì Stadium, Phú Thọ
Attendance: 7,538
Referee: Oh Hyeon-jeong (South Korea)

25 October 2024
16:00

Kyrgyzstan	2–3	Yemen
Kanatov 19'; Khe 39'	Report	Wahib Al-Garash 23' (pen.), 71' (pen.); Karem Abdulatef 48'

Việt Trì Stadium, Phú Thọ
Attendance: 469
Referee: Benjamin James Abraham (Australia)
25 October 2024
19:00

Myanmar	0–2	Vietnam
	Report	Nguyễn Văn Dương 68'; Trần Gia Bảo 89'

Việt Trì Stadium, Phú Thọ
Attendance: 7,136
Referee: Akobirkhuja Shukurullaev (Uzbekistan)

27 October 2024
16:00

Kyrgyzstan	1–2	Myanmar
Isakov 15'	Report	Khamidulloev 85' (o.g.); Aung Pyae Phyo 90+2'

Việt Trì Stadium, Phú Thọ
Attendance: 289
Referee: Amirul Mohd Jamil (Malaysia)
27 October 2024
19:00

Yemen	1–1	Vietnam
Karem Abdulatef 12'	Report	Lê Huy Việt Anh 30'

Việt Trì Stadium, Phú Thọ
Attendance: 4,823
Referee: Akobirkhuja Shukurullaev (Uzbekistan)

=== Group J ===
- All matches were held in Singapore.
- Times listed are UTC+8.

Pos	Team	Pld	W	D	L	GF	GA	GD	Pts	Qualification
1	Tajikistan	3	3	0	0	38	1	+37	9	Final tournament
2	Oman	3	2	0	1	23	2	+21	6	Final tournament
3	Singapore (H)	3	1	0	2	15	8	+7	3	
4	Guam	3	0	0	3	0	65	−65	0	

Source: AFC
Rules for classification: Qualification tiebreakers
(H) Hosts
23 October 2024
17:00

Tajikistan	33–0	Guam
Khudoidodov 2', 25'; Nazriev 5', 12', 22', 38', 49', 50', 55'; Nazriev (cont.) 66', 67', 73', 76', 82', 83'; Ashuralizoda 6', 10', 30', 38', 45+1', 52'; Jafoev 20', 23', 32'; Melikmurodov 35'; Bobonanazarov 41', 42'; Shoev 58'; Rozykov 62'; Makhtumov 63', 77'; Mirahmadov 70'; Maksudov 72'	Report

Bishan Stadium, Bishan
Attendance: 82
Referee: Jack Morgan (Australia)
23 October 2024
20:00

Oman	5–0	Singapore
Salim Al-Amrani 21' (pen.), 72'; Osama Al-Mamari 55', 88'; Dawood Al-Kharusi 69'	Report

Bishan Stadium, Bishan
Attendance: 605
Referee: Koki Nagamine (Japan)

25 October 2024
17:00

Guam	0–18	Oman
	Report	Wagas Al-Azki 8', 41', 77'; W. Al-Abdulsalam 17', 45'; Talal Al-Rashdi 19', 22', 38', 49'; Dawood Al-Kharusi 26'; Qais Shajana 52', 61', 83', 86'; W. Al-Baraidai 55'; Y. Al-Balushi 70'; Firas Al-Saadi 82', 90+1'

Bishan Stadium, Bishan
Attendance: 100
Referee: Nasir Uddin (Bangladesh)
25 October 2024
20:00

Singapore	1–3	Tajikistan
Shafrel Nizam 82'	Report	Khudoidodov 4'; Ashuralizoda 61', 86'

Bishan Stadium, Bishan
Attendance: 650
Referee: Samarathunge Madushanka (Sri Lanka)

27 October 2024
17:00

Tajikistan	2–0	Oman
Nazriev 70', 81'	Report

Bishan Stadium, Bishan
Attendance: 150
Referee: Kim Yu-jeong (South Korea)
27 October 2024
20:00

Singapore	14–0	Guam
Erdy Thaqib 23', 40'; Muhammad Helmi 25', 38', 88'; Uchenna Eziakor 32', 48', 52'; Reburiano 42' (o.g.); Qalish 50'; Andy Reefqy 75'; Mohammad Raihan 68', 80'; Ahmad Martin 73'	Report

Bishan Stadium, Bishan
Attendance: 664
Referee: Jack Morgan (Australia)

== Ranking of second-placed teams ==
Due to groups having a different number of teams, the results against the fifth-placed teams in five-team groups and the fourth-placed teams in five-team groups and four-team groups were not considered for this ranking.

Pos	Grp	Team	Pld	W	D	L	GF	GA	GD	Pts	Qualification
1	C	China	2	1	1	0	4	2	+2	4	Final tournament
2	I	Vietnam	2	1	1	0	3	1	+2	4	Final tournament
3	G	Indonesia	2	1	1	0	1	0	+1	4	Final tournament
4	A	Iran	2	1	0	1	8	5	+3	3	Final tournament
5	J	Oman	2	1	0	1	5	2	+3	3	Final tournament
6	E	Iraq	2	1	0	1	4	1	+3	3	
7	D	India	2	1	0	1	3	3	0	3	
8	F	Qatar	2	1	0	1	2	5	−3	3	
9	H	Malaysia	2	0	1	1	2	4	−2	1	
10	B	Philippines	2	0	0	2	0	9	−9	0	

Rules for classification: 1) points; 2) goal difference; 3) goals scored; 4) disciplinary points; 5) drawing of lots.

== Qualified teams ==
A total of 16 teams including hosts Saudi Arabia qualified for the final tournament.

Team	Qualified as	Appearance	Previous best performance^{1}
Saudi Arabia	Hosts	12th	Champions (1985, 1988)
North Korea	Group A winners	12th	Champions (2010, 2014)
Afghanistan	Group B winners	3rd	Group stage (2018, 2023)
South Korea	Group C winners	16th	Champions (1986, 2002)
Thailand	Group D winners	13th	Champions (1998)
Uzbekistan	Group E winners	11th	Champions (2012)
Japan	Group F winners	17th	Champions (1994, 2006, 2018, 2023)
Australia	Group G winners	8th	Semi-finals (2010, 2014, 2018)
United Arab Emirates	Group H winners	8th	Runners-up (1990)
Yemen	Group I winners	8th	Runners-up (2002)
Tajikistan	Group J winners	5th	Runners-up (2018)
China	Best runners-up	16th	Champions (1992, 2004)
Vietnam	2nd best runners-up	9th	Fourth place (2000)
Indonesia	3rd best runners-up	7th	Fourth place (1990)
Iran	4th best runners-up	13th	Champions (2008)
Oman	5th best runners-up	11th	Champions (1996, 2000)

^{1}Italic indicates hosts for that year.

== Goalscorers ==
There were 386 goals scored in 69 matches, for an average of 5.59 goals per match.

16 goals

- (Tajikistan) Muhammadjon Nazriev

8 goals

- (Tajikistan) Nazrullo Ashuralizoda

6 goals

- (Japan) Hiroto Asada
- (Japan) Daichi Tani
- (Turkmenistan) Suleýmannazar Gowşudow

5 goals

- (Afghanistan) Arash Ahmadi
- (Afghanistan) Mohammad Shirzai
- (Australia) Anthony Didulica
- (North Korea) Kim Yu-jin
- (Qatar) Zaid Faisal

4 goals

- (Afghanistan) Yaser Safi
- (Australia) Quinn MacNicol
- (Bangladesh) Nazmul Huda Faysal
- (China) Wei Xiangxin
- (China) Yang Qiandong
- (India) Vishal Yadav
- (Iran) Omid Garachchomaghloo
- (Kuwait) Abdullah Al-Qarzaei
- (North Korea) Ri Kang-rim
- (Oman) Al-Walid Al-Rashdi
- (Oman) Qais Shajana
- (Singapore) Uchenna Eziakor
- (South Korea) Jun Min-seong
- (Thailand) Pirada Larsawat
- (Yemen) Mohammed Wahib Al-Garash

3 goals

- (Australia) Max Anastasio
- (Australia) Amlani Tatu
- (Iran) Erfan Khodadadian
- (Iraq) Ameer Falah Hasan
- (Laos) Phayak Siphanom
- (Oman) Waqas Al-Azki
- (Philippines) Spencer Webster
- (Singapore) Helmi bin Shahrol
- (South Korea) Kim Ji-sung
- (South Korea) Lee Ji-ho
- (South Korea) Park Byeong-chan
- (Tajikistan) Umed Jafoev
- (Tajikistan) Haidarsho Khudoidodov
- (Thailand) Kittiphop Chephankhung
- (Thailand) Jompon Honboonma
- (Thailand) Siwakorn Ponsan
- (Thailand) Phanuphong Wan-on
- (Yemen) Karem Hamdi Abdulatef

2 goals

- (Afghanistan) Nawid Mahbobi
- (Afghanistan) Sahil Sarwari
- (Australia) Alexander Garbowski
- (Australia) Max Naylor
- (China) Bian Yulang
- (China) Li Xiang
- (China) Hebibilla Nurhaji
- (Hong Kong) Yiu Tsz Leong
- (Hong Kong) Cheung Yiu Hin
- (India) Ngamgouhou Mate
- (Indonesia) Aldyansyah Taher
- (Indonesia) Komang Gelgel
- (Indonesia) Zahaby Gholy
- (Iraq) Zain Al-Abidin Jassim
- (Japan) Mibuki Kasai
- (Japan) Hyoei Kawabata
- (Jordan) Kazrg Al-Qasem
- (Kuwait) Fawaz Al-Dawood
- (Kuwait) Abdulrahman Al-Suwaidi
- (Maldives) Mohamed Ilan Imran
- (North Korea) Choe Song-hun
- (North Korea) Pak Kwang-song
- (Oman) Al-Walid Al-Abdulsalam
- (Oman) Ahmed Al-'Amrani
- (Oman) Sulaiman Al-Kharusi
- (Oman) Osama Al-Ma'mari
- (Oman) Firas Al-Sa'di
- (Palestine) Aseeb Abudeiab
- (Singapore) Andy Reefqy
- (Singapore) Erdy Thaqib
- (Singapore) Raihan bin Rafiq
- (South Korea) Lee Sang-yeon
- (South Korea) Lee Su-yoon
- (South Korea) Lim Ye-chan
- (Syria) Abdulrahman Dinawi
- (Tajikistan) Asadbek Makhtumov
- (Tajikistan) Parviz Bobonanazarov
- (Thailand) Thitinai Jongketkorn
- (Thailand) Sorawit Srilang
- (Turkmenistan) Arslan Wepaýew
- (United Arab Emirates) Mayed Adel Khamis
- (United Arab Emirates) Mohammed Buti Al-Marar
- (Uzbekistan) Nurbek Sarsenbaev
- (Yemen) Ahmed Abdullah Mohyam

1 goal

- (Afghanistan) Mohammad Ibrahimi
- (Afghanistan) Nasir Ahmad Mohammadi
- (Afghanistan) Milad Noori
- (Afghanistan) Mohammad Nowrozi
- (Afghanistan) Mohammad Waris Raziqi
- (Australia) Nickolas Alfaro
- (Australia) Jay Maltz
- (Australia) Charlie Parkin
- (Bahrain) Ebrahim Ahmed Ayash
- (Bahrain) Abdulrahman Bassam
- (Bangladesh) Mursed Ali
- (Bangladesh) Md Manik
- (Bangladesh) Md Rifat Kazi
- (Bangladesh) Mohammad Shofiq Rahman
- (Bhutan) Sayon Lama
- (Bhutan) Thinley Yezer
- (Cambodia) Rintaro Sakakibara
- (Cambodia) Thach Daro
- (Cambodia) Pov Pimakara
- (China) Bunyamin Abdulsalam
- (China) Wen Zhanlin
- (China) Yao Junyu
- (China) Zhang Chengrui
- (Hong Kong) Wong Yat Hin
- (Hong Kong) Jeffery Chin
- (Hong Kong) Hui Siu Chung
- (India) Md Arbash
- (India) Mohammed Kaif
- (India) Azlaan Shah KH
- (India) Bharat Lairenjam
- (India) Hemneichung Lunkim
- (India) Manbhakupar Malngiang
- (India) Ningthoukhongjam Rishi Singh
- (India) Mahmad Sami
- (India) Sumit Sharma
- (India) Usham Thougamba Singh
- (Indonesia) Fadly Alberto
- (Indonesia) Mathew Baker
- (Indonesia) Daniel Alfrido
- (Indonesia) Evandra Florasta
- (Indonesia) Ida Bagus Cahya
- (Iran) Mehrdad Aghamohammadi
- (Iran) Iliya Ahmadimanesh
- (Iran) Mahan Alipour
- (Iran) Salman Ghafarifouzi
- (Iran) Abolfazl Kazemirekabdarkolaei
- (Iraq) Ali Al-Lami
- (Iraq) Karrar Al-Saedi
- (Iraq) Murtadha Al-Saedi
- (Iraq) Hayder Al-Talebi
- (Japan) Kaiji Chonan
- (Japan) Kosuke Imai
- (Japan) Taiga Seguchi
- (Jordan) Mohammad Aburomeh
- (Jordan) Noureldeen Amro
- (Kuwait) Mubarak Al-Ajmi
- (Kuwait) Ahmed Mesyer
- (Kyrgyzstan) Amantur Isakov
- (Kyrgyzstan) Kairat Kanatov
- (Kyrgyzstan) Innan Khe
- (Laos) Palindeth Phettakounh
- (Malaysia) Arayyan Hakeem
- (Malaysia) Naqif Firhad
- (Mongolia) Odkhuu Soyol
- (Myanmar) Aung Pyae Phyo
- (Myanmar) Thura Min Than
- (Nepal) Bigyan Khadka
- (Nepal) Sabin Kumar
- (North Korea) An Jin-sok
- (North Korea) Kim Tae-guk
- (North Korea) Ri Ro-gwon
- (North Korea) Ri Tae-myong
- (Oman) Al-Yazan Al-Balushi
- (Oman) Al-Walid Al-Baraidai
- (Philippines) Sambher Abrenica
- (Philippines) Luke Amann
- (Philippines) Joshua Moleje
- (Philippines) Anthony Moutzouris
- (Philippines) Edvard Omitade
- (Philippines) Matthew Steen
- (Qatar) Omar Al-Marzouqi
- (Qatar) Yazan Hani Mohamed
- (Singapore) Ahmad Martin
- (Singapore) Shafrel Ariel
- (South Korea) Kim Eun-seong
- (South Korea) Kim Min-chan
- (South Korea) Oh Ha-ram
- (Syria) Bashar Al-Hariri
- (Syria) Ahmad Khalaf
- (Syria) Abdulrahman Al Sarraj
- (Tajikistan) David Maksudov
- (Tajikistan) Abdusamad Melikmurodov
- (Tajikistan) Muhammadjon Mirahmadov
- (Tajikistan) Mehrojidin Rozykov
- (Thailand) Sorakrit Kaewsri
- (Thailand) Chaiwat Ngernma
- (Thailand) Thatasaporn Phuengkuson
- (Thailand) Chatchawat Sahanunchaichid
- (Turkmenistan) Hudaýnazar Meredow
- (Turkmenistan) Weýsgeldi Oräzdurdyýew
- (United Arab Emirates) Faisal Al-Breiki
- (United Arab Emirates) Suhail Al-Suwaidi
- (Uzbekistan) Muminkhon Bakhodirkhonov
- (Uzbekistan) Sadriddin Khasanov
- (Uzbekistan) Abubakir Shukurullaev
- (Vietnam) Lê Huy Việt Anh
- (Vietnam) Nguyễn Văn Dương
- (Vietnam) Trần Gia Bảo
- (Yemen) Esam Obaid Al-Sakkaf

1 own goal

- (Jordan) Kazrg Al-Qasem (against Iran)
- (Kyrgyzstan) Mukhammadier Khamidulloev (against Myanmar)
- (Laos) Ki Mounkanyah (against the UAE)
- (Macau) Tang Tin (against Bangladesh)
- (Mongolia) Batmend Baasanjav (against Japan)
- (Qatar) Seifeldin Hassanein (against Japan)

== See also ==
- 2025 AFC U-17 Asian Cup
- 2025 AFC U-20 Asian Cup qualification
