= 2025 AFC U-17 Asian Cup =

كأس آسيا تحت 17 سنة 2025

Tournament details
- Host country: Saudi Arabia
- Dates: 3–20 April
- Teams: 16 (from 1 confederation)
- Venues: 4 (in 2 host cities)

Final positions
- Champions: Uzbekistan (2nd title)
- Runners-up: Saudi Arabia

Tournament statistics
- Matches played: 31
- Goals scored: 101 (3.26 per match)
- Attendance: 17,665 (570 per match)
- Top scorer(s): (Uzbekistan) Asilbek Aliev (5 goals)
- Best player: (Uzbekistan) Sadriddin Khasanov
- Best goalkeeper: (Uzbekistan) Nematulloh Rustamjonov
- Fair play award: Saudi Arabia

The 2025 AFC U-17 Asian Cup was the 20th edition of the AFC U-17 Asian Cup (including previous editions of the AFC U-16 Championship and AFC U-17 Championship), the biennial international youth football championship organised by the Asian Football Confederation (AFC) for the men's under-17 national teams of Asia.

On 24 May 2024, the AFC announced that Saudi Arabia would host the tournament. It was the first of the four consecutive AFC U-17 Asian Cup held in Saudi Arabia, preceding the 2026, 2027 and 2028 tournament, which also held in Saudi Arabia.

A total of 16 teams played in the tournament. The quarter-finalists qualified for the 2025 FIFA U-17 World Cup in Qatar as the AFC representatives, besides Qatar who qualified automatically as the host.

Japan were the title holders, having won their fourth title in 2023. They were eliminated in the quarter-finals by Saudi Arabia. Saudi Arabia then lost the final to Uzbekistan, who also defeated them in the group stage, despite the latter having two players dismissed in the first half.

== Qualification ==
Qualification matches were played between 19 and 27 October 2024.

=== Qualified teams ===
A total of 16 teams including hosts Saudi Arabia qualified for the final tournament.

Team	Qualified as	Appearance	Previous best performance
Saudi Arabia	Hosts	12th	**Champions** (1985, 1988)
North Korea	Group A winners	12th	**Champions** (2010, 2014)
Afghanistan	Group B winners	3rd	Group stage (2018, 2023)
South Korea	Group C winners	16th	**Champions** (1986, 2002)
Thailand	Group D winners	13th	**Champions** (1998)
Uzbekistan	Group E winners	11th	**Champions** (2012)
Japan	Group F winners	17th	**Champions** (1994, 2006, 2018, 2023)
Australia	Group G winners	8th	Semi-finals (2010, 2014, 2018)
United Arab Emirates	Group H winners	8th	Runners-up (1990)
Yemen	Group I winners	8th	Runners-up (2002)
Tajikistan	Group J winners	5th	Runners-up (2018)
China	Best runners-up	16th	**Champions** (1992, 2004)
Vietnam	2nd best runners-up	9th	Fourth place (2000)
Indonesia	3rd best runners-up	7th	Fourth place (1990)
Iran	4th best runners-up	13th	**Champions** (2008)
Oman	5th best runners-up	11th	**Champions** (1996, 2000)

^{1} Bold indicates champions for that year. Italic indicates hosts for that year.

== Venues ==
Four stadiums in two host cities were used for the tournament.

Jeddah
Prince Abdullah Al Faisal Sports City Stadium	King Abdullah Sports City Hall Stadium
Capacity: 25,000	Capacity: 1,000
Location of the stadiums of the 2025 AFC U-17 Asian Cup (Saudi Arabia)
Taif
King Fahd Sports City Stadium	Okadh Sport Club Stadium
Capacity: 20,000	Capacity: 1,500

== Match officials ==
Referees

- (Australia) Daniel Elder
- (China) Dong Fangyu
- (China) Jin Jingyuan
- (India) Venkatesh Ramachandran
- (Iran) Morteza Mansourian
- (Japan) Koki Nagamine
- (Jordan) Mahmoud Al-Sawalmeh
- (Qatar) Mohammed Al-Shammari
- (Saudi Arabia) Faisal Al-Balawi
- (South Korea) Kim Yu-jeong
- (Tajikistan) Abdullo Davlatov
- (Thailand) Torphong Somsing

Assistant referees

- (Australia) Andrew Meimarakis
- (China) Bao Mengxiao
- (China) Wu Mingfeng
- (Hong Kong) Lam Nai Kei
- (India) Vairamuthu Parasuraman
- (Iran) Alireza Moradi
- (Japan) Isao Nishihashi
- (Jordan) Hamza Sa'adeh
- (Lebanon) Ali Alachkar
- (Malaysia) Farhan Abdul Aziz
- (Palestine) Ashraf Abu Zubaida
- (Qatar) Yousuf Al-Shammari
- (Saudi Arabia) Faisal Al-Qahtani
- (Saudi Arabia) Ibrahim Al-Dakhil
- (Chinese Taipei) Kuo Chan-yu
- (Tajikistan) Vafo Karaev
- (Thailand) Nuannid Dornjangreed

== Draw ==
The draw of the final tournament was held on 23 January 2025 at the AFC House in Kuala Lumpur, Malaysia. The 16 teams were drawn into four groups of four teams, with the teams seeded according to their final rankings across the previous three editions (2016, 2018, 2023), with the hosts Saudi Arabia automatically seeded and assigned to Position A1 in the draw.

Pot 1	Pot 2	Pot 3	Pot 4
1. Saudi Arabia (hosts); 2. Japan; 3. South Korea; 4. Iran	5. Australia; 6. Yemen; 7. Uzbekistan; 8. Tajikistan	9. Thailand; 10. Vietnam; 11. Oman; 12. Afghanistan	13. China; 14. Indonesia; 15. North Korea; 16. United Arab Emirates

== Squads ==
Players born between 1 January 2008 and 31 December 2010 were eligible to compete in the tournament. Each team had to register a squad of minimum 18 players and maximum 23 players, minimum three of whom must have been goalkeepers (Regulations Articles 26.3).

== Group stage ==
The group winners and runners-up advanced to the quarter-finals and qualified for the 2025 FIFA U-17 World Cup.

Tiebreakers

Teams were ranked according to points (3 points for a win, 1 point for a draw, 0 points for a loss), and if tied on points, the following tie-breaking criteria were applied, in the order given, to determine the rankings:

1. Points in head-to-head matches among tied teams;
2. Goal difference in head-to-head matches among tied teams;
3. Goals scored in head-to-head matches among tied teams;
4. If more than two teams are tied, and after applying all head-to-head criteria above, a subset of teams are still tied, all head-to-head criteria above are reapplied exclusively to this subset of teams;
5. Goal difference in all group matches;
6. Goals scored in all group matches;
7. Penalty shoot-out if only two teams were tied and they met in the last round of the group;
8. Disciplinary points (yellow card = 1 point, red card as a result of two yellow cards = 3 points, direct red card = 3 points, yellow card followed by direct red card = 4 points);
9. Drawing of lots.

All match times are in local time, AST (UTC+3).

=== Group A ===
Pos	Team	Pld	W	D	L	GF	GA	GD	Pts	Qualification
1	Uzbekistan	3	3	0	0	9	2	+7	9	Knockout stage and FIFA U-17 World Cup
2	Saudi Arabia (H)	3	2	0	1	5	5	0	6	Knockout stage and FIFA U-17 World Cup
3	China	3	1	0	2	4	4	0	3	
4	Thailand	3	0	0	3	2	9	−7	0	

Source: AFC
Rules for classification: Group stage tiebreakers
(H) Hosts
3 April 2025
18:00

Uzbekistan	4–1	Thailand
Khasanov 2'; Sarsenbaev 13'; Aliev 80'; Shukurullaev 85'	Report	Mexes 40'

Okadh Sport Club Stadium, Taif
Attendance: 118
Referee: Mahmoud Al-Sawalmeh (Jordan)
3 April 2025
20:15

Saudi Arabia	2–1	China
Matari 11'; Al-Daghnah 45+2'	Report	Wei Xiangxin 90+8'

King Fahd Sports City Stadium, Taif
Attendance: 498
Referee: Mohammed Al-Shammari (Qatar)

6 April 2025
18:00

China	1–2	Uzbekistan
Zhang Chengrui 33'	Report	Khasanov 45+1'; Aliev 86'

Okadh Sport Club Stadium, Taif
Attendance: 79
Referee: Venkatesh Ramachandran (India)
6 April 2025
20:15

Thailand	1–3	Saudi Arabia
Siwakorn 17'	Report	Dahal 29'; Sufyani 75'; Barnawi 78'

King Fahd Sports City Stadium, Taif
Attendance: 318
Referee: Koki Nagamine (Japan)

9 April 2025
20:15

Thailand	0–2	China
	Report	Bunyamin 56' (pen.); Jiang Zhiqin 59'

Okadh Sport Club Stadium, Taif
Attendance: 60
Referee: Kim Yu-jeong (South Korea)
9 April 2025
20:15

Saudi Arabia	0–3	Uzbekistan
	Report	Rustamov 57' (pen.), 69'; Aliev 63'

King Fahd Sports City Stadium, Taif
Attendance: 1,031
Referee: Daniel Elder (Australia)

=== Group B ===
Pos	Team	Pld	W	D	L	GF	GA	GD	Pts	Qualification
1	Japan	3	1	1	1	7	5	+2	4 (Note: Head-to-head points: Japan 3, United Arab Emirates 3, Australia 3. Head-to-head goal difference: Japan +2, United Arab Emirates –1, Australia –1. Head-to-head points between the United Arab Emirates and Australia: United Arab Emirates 3, Australia 0.)	Knockout stage and FIFA U-17 World Cup
2	United Arab Emirates	3	1	1	1	4	5	−1	4	Knockout stage and FIFA U-17 World Cup
3	Australia	3	1	1	1	4	5	−1	4	
4	Vietnam	3	0	3	0	3	3	0	3	

Source: AFC
Rules for classification: Group stage tiebreakers
Notes:
4 April 2025
18:00

Australia	1–1	Vietnam
MacNicol 41'	Report	Hoàng Trọng Duy Khang 49'

Okadh Sport Club Stadium, Taif
Attendance: 70
Referee: Kim Yu-jeong (South Korea)
4 April 2025
20:15

Japan	4–1	United Arab Emirates
Yoshida 3', 15'; Kamo 34'; Asada 83'	Report	Mohammed 71'

King Fahd Sports City Stadium, Taif
Attendance: 53
Referee: Faisal Al-Balawi (Saudi Arabia)

7 April 2025
18:00

Vietnam	1–1	Japan
Trần Gia Bảo 90+6' (pen.)	Report	Yoshida 13'

Okadh Sport Club Stadium, Taif
Referee: Morteza Mansourian (Iran)
7 April 2025
20:15

United Arab Emirates	2–0	Australia
Adel 9'; Buti 52'	Report

King Fahd Sports City Stadium, Taif
Attendance: 76
Referee: Jin Jingyuan (China)

10 April 2025
18:00

Japan	2–3	Australia
Fujita 7'; Tani 86'	Report	Miliner 51'; Anastasio 71'; Garbowski 74'

Okadh Sport Club Stadium, Taif
Attendance: 144
Referee: Dong Fangyu (China)
10 April 2025
18:00

Vietnam	1–1	United Arab Emirates
Hoàng Trọng Duy Khang 23'	Report	Faisal 87'

King Fahd Sports City Stadium, Taif
Attendance: 59
Referee: Mohammed Al-Shammari (Qatar)

=== Group C ===
Pos	Team	Pld	W	D	L	GF	GA	GD	Pts	Qualification
1	Indonesia	3	3	0	0	7	1	+6	9	Knockout stage and FIFA U-17 World Cup
2	South Korea	3	2	0	1	7	1	+6	6	Knockout stage and FIFA U-17 World Cup
3	Yemen	3	1	0	2	3	5	−2	3	
4	Afghanistan	3	0	0	3	0	10	−10	0	

Source: AFC
Rules for classification: Group stage tiebreakers
4 April 2025
18:00

South Korea	0–1	Indonesia
	Report	Evandra 90+2'

Prince Abdullah Al-Faisal Stadium, Jeddah
Attendance: 950
Referee: Jin Jingyuan (China)
4 April 2025
20:15

Yemen	2–0	Afghanistan
Al-Raawi 24'; Al-Garash 27' (pen.)	Report

King Abdullah Sports City Hall Stadium, Jeddah
Attendance: 176
Referee: Dong Fangyu (China)

7 April 2025
18:00

Indonesia	4–1	Yemen
Gholy 15'; Alberto 25'; Evandra 87' (pen.), 89'	Report	Al-Garash 52' (pen.)

Prince Abdullah Al-Faisal Stadium, Jeddah
Referee: Abdullo Davlatov (Tajikistan)
7 April 2025
20:15

Afghanistan	0–6	South Korea
	Report	Jung Hee-jung 3'; Kim Ye-geon 9' (pen.); Kim Eun-seong 17', 70'; Oh Ha-ram 51'; Park Byeong-chan 66'

King Abdullah Sports City Hall Stadium, Jeddah
Attendance: 39
Referee: Mahmoud Al-Sawalmeh (Jordan)

10 April 2025
20:15

South Korea	1–0	Yemen
Kim Eun-seong 29'	Report

King Abdullah Sports City Hall Stadium, Jeddah
Attendance: 152
Referee: Faisal Al-Balawi (Saudi Arabia)
10 April 2025
20:15

Afghanistan	0–2	Indonesia
	Report	Alberto 90+4'; Gholy 90+6'

Prince Abdullah Al-Faisal Stadium, Jeddah
Attendance: 1,122
Referee: Venkatesh Ramachandran (India)

=== Group D ===
Pos	Team	Pld	W	D	L	GF	GA	GD	Pts	Qualification
1	Tajikistan	3	2	0	1	5	5	0	6	Knockout stage and FIFA U-17 World Cup
2	North Korea	3	1	2	0	6	3	+3	5	Knockout stage and FIFA U-17 World Cup
3	Oman	3	1	1	1	6	6	0	4	
4	Iran	3	0	1	2	4	7	−3	1	

Source: AFC
Rules for classification: Group stage tiebreakers
5 April 2025
18:00

Tajikistan	2–1	Oman
Zarifzoda 3'; Ashuralizoda 49'	Report	Al-Mashaykhi 11'

King Abdullah Sports City Hall Stadium, Jeddah
Attendance: 30
Referee: Torphong Somsing (Thailand)
5 April 2025
20:15

Iran	1–1	North Korea
Sahneh 24'	Report	Choe Chung-hyok 8'

Prince Abdullah Al-Faisal Stadium, Jeddah
Attendance: 25
Referee: Daniel Elder (Australia)

8 April 2025
18:00

North Korea	3–0	Tajikistan
Pak Kwang-song 50', 58'; Ri Kang-rim 82'	Report

King Abdullah Sports City Hall Stadium, Jeddah
Attendance: 36
Referee: Faisal Al-Balawi (Saudi Arabia)
8 April 2025
20:15

Oman	3–2	Iran
Al-Rashdi 53'; Al-Amrani 74' (pen.), 89'	Report	Beheshti 40'; Kheradpisheh 54'

Prince Abdullah Al-Faisal Stadium, Jeddah
Attendance: 25
Referee: Mohammed Al-Shammari (Qatar)

11 April 2025
20:15

Iran	1–3	Tajikistan
Gharahchomaghloo 52'	Report	Odilzoda 12'; Shoev 67'; Ibragimzoda 89'

Prince Abdullah Al-Faisal Stadium, Jeddah
Attendance: 38
Referee: Koki Nagamine (Japan)
11 April 2025
20:15

Oman	2–2	North Korea
Al-Maamari 65'; Salam 90+8'	Report	Kim Yu-jin 10'; Ri Kang-rim 74'

King Abdullah Sports City Hall Stadium, Jeddah
Attendance: 30
Referee: Jin Jingyuan (China)

== Knockout stage ==
In the knockout stage, if a match was level at the end of 90 minutes of normal playing time, the match would be decided by a penalty shoot-out to determine the winner; no extra time would be played.

All eight teams that reached the knockout stage qualified for the 2025 FIFA U-17 World Cup.

=== Bracket ===
Quarter-finals
13 April 2025 – Taif (King)
Uzbekistan	3
United Arab Emirates	1
14 April 2025 – Jeddah (King)
Indonesia	0
North Korea	6
13 April 2025 – Taif (Okadh)
Japan	2 (2)
Saudi Arabia (p)	2 (3)
14 April 2025 – Jeddah (Prince)
Tajikistan	2 (3)
South Korea (p)	2 (5)

Semi-finals
17 April 2025 – Taif (King)
Uzbekistan	3
North Korea	0
17 April 2025 – Taif (Okadh)
Saudi Arabia (p)	1 (3)
South Korea	1 (1)

Final
20 April 2025 – Taif (King)
Uzbekistan	2
Saudi Arabia	0

=== Quarter-finals ===
13 April 2025
17:00

Japan	2–2	Saudi Arabia
Seguchi 9' (pen.); Asada 72'	Report	A. Saeed 17' (pen.); Dahal 37'
Penalties
Asada (penalty scored); Yoshida (penalty scored); Kamo (penalty missed); Fujii (penalty missed); Hariu (penalty missed)	2–3	(penalty scored) Alfihani; (penalty scored) Aldosari; (penalty missed) T. Saeed; (penalty scored) Tawashi

Okadh Sport Club Stadium, Taif
Attendance: 786
Referee: Daniel Elder (Australia)

13 April 2025
20:15

Uzbekistan	3–1	United Arab Emirates
Aliev 14', 36'; Sodikov 45+5' (pen.)	Report	Buti 67'

King Fahd Sports City Stadium, Taif
Attendance: 116
Referee: Kim Yu-jeong (South Korea)

14 April 2025
17:00

Indonesia	0–6	North Korea
	Report	Choe Song-hun 7'; Kim Yu-jin 19'; Ri Kyong-bong 48'; Kim Tae-guk 60' (pen.); Ri Kang-rim 61'; Pak Ju-won 77'

King Abdullah Sports City Hall Stadium, Jeddah
Attendance: 436
Referee: Morteza Mansourian (Iran)

14 April 2025
20:15

Tajikistan	2–2	South Korea
Nazriev 83'; Ibragimzoda 85'	Report	Jeong Hyeon-ung 67'; Kim Ji-sung 90+9' (pen.)
Penalties
Zarifzoda (penalty scored); Rahimzoda (penalty missed); Shoev (penalty scored); Ashuralizoda (penalty scored)	3–5	(penalty scored) Kim Ye-geon; (penalty scored) Kim Ji-sung; (penalty scored) Kim Eun-seong; (penalty scored) So Yoon-woo; (penalty scored) Koo Hyeon-bin

Prince Abdullah Al-Faisal Stadium, Jeddah
Attendance: 108
Referee: Dong Fangyu (China)

=== Semi-finals ===
17 April 2025
17:00

Saudi Arabia	1–1	South Korea
A. Saeed 90+12' (pen.)	Report	Oh Ha-ram 45'
Penalties
Alfawaz (penalty scored); Dahal (penalty scored); Sufyani (penalty missed); T. Saeed (penalty scored)	3–1	(penalty scored) Kim Ji-sung; (penalty missed) Kim Min-chan; (penalty missed) Jeong Hyeon-ung; (penalty missed) Kim Do-yeon

Okadh Sport Club Stadium, Taif
Attendance: 790
Referee: Koki Nagamine (Japan)

17 April 2025
20:15

Uzbekistan	3–0	North Korea
Khasanov 31'; Rustamov 62'; Shukurullaev 65'	Report

King Fahd Sports City Stadium, Taif
Attendance: 75
Referee: Jin Jingyuan (China)

=== Final ===
20 April 2025
18:00

Uzbekistan	2–0	Saudi Arabia
Khakimov 51' (pen.); Khasanov 70'	Report

King Fahd Sports City Stadium, Taif
Attendance: 10,225
Referee: Mohammed Al-Shammari (Qatar)

== Awards ==
The following awards were given at the conclusion of the tournament:

Top goalscorer	Most Valuable Player	Best Goalkeeper	Fair Play award
(Uzbekistan) Asilbek Aliev (5 goals)	(Uzbekistan) Sadriddin Khasanov	(Uzbekistan) Nematulloh Rustamjonov	Saudi Arabia

== Goalscorers ==
There were 101 goals scored in 31 matches, for an average of 3.26 goals per match.

5 goals

- (Uzbekistan) Asilbek Aliev

4 goals

- (Uzbekistan) Sadriddin Khasanov

3 goals

- (Indonesia) Evandra Florasta
- (Japan) Minato Yoshida
- (North Korea) Ri Kang-rim
- (South Korea) Kim Eun-seong
- (Uzbekistan) Jamshidbek Rustamov

2 goals

- (Indonesia) Fadly Alberto
- (Indonesia) Zahaby Gholy
- (Japan) Hiroto Asada
- (North Korea) Kim Yu-jin
- (North Korea) Pak Kwang-song
- (Oman) Ahmed Al-Amrani
- (Saudi Arabia) Sabri Dahal
- (Saudi Arabia) Abu Baker Saeed
- (South Korea) Oh Ha-ram
- (Tajikistan) Abdullo Ibragimzoda
- (United Arab Emirates) Mohamed Buti
- (Uzbekistan) Abubakir Shukurullaev
- (Vietnam) Hoàng Trọng Duy Khang
- (Yemen) Mohammed Al-Garash

1 goal

- (Australia) Max Anastasio
- (Australia) Alexander Garbowski
- (Australia) Quinn MacNicol
- (Australia) Miles Miliner
- (China) Bunyamin Abdusalam
- (China) Jiang Zhiqin
- (China) Wei Xiangxin
- (China) Zhang Chengrui
- (Iran) Mahan Bereshti
- (Iran) Omid Gharahchomaghloo
- (Iran) Ehsan Kheradpisheh
- (Iran) Mehdi Sahneh
- (Japan) Asuto Fujita
- (Japan) Yuito Kamo
- (Japan) Taiga Seguchi
- (Japan) Daichi Tani
- (North Korea) Choe Chung-hyok
- (North Korea) Choe Song-hun
- (North Korea) Kim Tae-guk
- (North Korea) Pak Ju-won
- (North Korea) Ri Kyong-bong
- (Oman) Osama Al-Maamari
- (Oman) Mohammed Al-Mashaykhi
- (Oman) Al-Walid Al-Rashdi
- (Oman) Al-Walid Salam
- (Saudi Arabia) Osamah Al-Daghnah
- (Saudi Arabia) Mukhtar Ali Barnawi
- (Saudi Arabia) Abdulhadi Matari
- (Saudi Arabia) Abdulrahman Sufyani
- (South Korea) Jeong Hyeon-ung
- (South Korea) Jung Hee-jung
- (South Korea) Kim Ji-sung
- (South Korea) Kim Ye-geon
- (South Korea) Park Byeong-chan
- (Tajikistan) Nazrullo Ashuralizoda
- (Tajikistan) Mukhammad Nazriev
- (Tajikistan) Mekhrubon Odilzoda
- (Tajikistan) Akhmadchon Shoev
- (Tajikistan) Zarif Zarifzoda
- (Thailand) Silva Mexes
- (Thailand) Siwakorn Phonsan
- (United Arab Emirates) Mayed Adel
- (United Arab Emirates) Hazaa Faisal
- (United Arab Emirates) Faysal Mohammed
- (Uzbekistan) Muhammad Khakimov
- (Uzbekistan) Nurbek Sarsenbaev
- (Uzbekistan) Sayfiddin Sodikov
- (Vietnam) Trần Gia Bảo
- (Yemen) Mohammed Al-Raawi

== Qualified teams for FIFA U-17 World Cup ==
The following nine teams from AFC qualified for the 2025 FIFA U-17 World Cup; Qatar qualified automatically as the hosts.

Team	Qualified on	Previous appearances in FIFA U-17 World Cup^{1}
Qatar	14 March 2024	7 (1985, 1987, 1991, 1993, 1995, 1999, 2005)
Saudi Arabia	6 April 2025	3 (1985, 1987, **1989**)
Uzbekistan	6 April 2025	3 (2011, 2013, 2023)
Indonesia	7 April 2025	1 (2023)
Japan	10 April 2025	10 (1993, 1995, 2001, 2007, 2009, 2011, 2013, 2017, 2019, 2023)
South Korea	10 April 2025	7 (1987, 2003, 2007, 2009, 2015, 2019, 2023)
United Arab Emirates	10 April 2025	3 (1991, 2009, 2013)
North Korea	11 April 2025	5 (2005, 2007, 2011, 2015, 2017)
Tajikistan	11 April 2025	2 (2007, 2019)

^{1} Bold indicates champions for that year. Italic indicates hosts for that year.

== See also ==
- 2025 AFC U-20 Asian Cup
