= Philippines national under-17 football team =

Philippines U-17
- Association: Philippine Football Federation
- Confederation: AFC (Asia)
- Sub-confederation: AFF (Southeast Asia)
- Head coach: Joan Segura
- Captain: Leo Garcia
- FIFA code: PHI

First international
- Nepal 2–0 Philippines (Bangkok, Thailand; August 21, 1984)

Biggest win
- Northern Mariana Islands 2–9 Philippines (Vientiane, Laos; September 20, 2015); Philippines 7–0 Northern Mariana Islands (Jakarta, Indonesia; September 14, 2019); Macau 0–7 Philippines (Phnom Penh, Cambodia; October 19, 2024)

Biggest defeat
- Japan 16–0 Philippines (Nagoya, Japan; June 21, 2000)

World Cup
- Appearances: 0

Asian Cup
- Appearances: 0

ASEAN Championship
- Appearances: 11 (first in 2002)
- Best result: Group stage (2002, 2011, 2013, 2015, 2016, 2017, 2018, 2019, 2022, 2024, 2026)

The Philippines national under-17 football team is the national under-17 football team of the Philippines and represents the country in international football competitions such as the FIFA U-17 World Cup, the AFC U-17 Asian Cup, the ASEAN U-16 Boys Championship and any other under-17 international football tournaments. The team is controlled by the Philippine Football Federation (PFF), the governing body of football in the Philippines.

Their first international tournament title was the four-nation Singapore-hosted 2025 Lion City Cup.

== Results and fixtures ==
The following is a list of match results in the last 12 months, as well as any future matches that have been scheduled.

Win Draw Lose

=== 2025 ===
| November 24 2026 AFC U-17 Asian Cup qualification | Bhutan | 0–0 | Philippines | Aqaba, Jordan |
| 19:00 UTC+3 | | Report | | Stadium: Aqaba Stadium |

| November 28 2026 AFC U-17 Asian Cup qualification | Philippines | 0–6 | Australia | Aqaba, Jordan |
| 16:00 UTC+3 | | Report | Hassarati 4', 23', 60'; H. Oliveira 6'; Ng 76'; Shah 90' | Stadium: Aqaba Stadium |

| November 30 2026 AFC U-17 Asian Cup qualification | Jordan | 6–1 | Philippines | Aqaba, Jordan |
| 16:00 UTC+3 | Aljawhari 21'; Dehim 43', 70'; Abusa'ad 73'; E'Layan 74', 90' | Report | Long 86' | Stadium: Aqaba Stadium |

=== 2026 ===
| April 12 2026 ASEAN U-17 Boys' Championship | Thailand | 5–1 | Philippines | Gresik, Indonesia |
| 15:30 UTC+7 | Worawit 9'; Pattarawee 28'; Thodsadon 39'; Sathaporn 62'; Bacara 65' (o.g.) | Report | Long 79' | Stadium: Gelora Joko Samudro Stadium |

| April 15 2026 ASEAN U-17 Boys' Championship | Philippines | 3–4 | Laos | Gresik, Indonesia |
| 15:30 UTC+7 | Moleje 17'; Long 40'; Villanueva 83' (pen.) | Report | Chanthalangsy 2'; Pradith 45+2', 56'; Anousa 90' | Stadium: Gelora Joko Samudro Stadium; Attendance: 22; Referee: Clarence Leow (Singapore) |

| April 18 2026 ASEAN U-17 Boys' Championship | Myanmar | 1–2 | Philippines | Gresik, Indonesia |
| 15:30 UTC+7 | Nyi Nyi Thant 20' | Report | Long 81', 85' | Stadium: Gelora Joko Samudro Stadium |

| November 8 2027 AFC U-17 Asian Cup qualification | Cambodia | 1–2 | Philippines | Thanlyin, Myanmar |
| 15:00 UTC+7 | Long 45+3' | Report | Müller 39', 69' | Stadium: StarCity Sports Club Stadium; Referee: Mohammad Osama Diwan (Jordan) |

| November 11 2027 AFC U-17 Asian Cup qualification | Philippines | 0–3 | Indonesia | Yangon, Myanmar |
| 15:00 UTC+7 | Dhamar 37', 45+1'; Majesta 76' | Report | | Stadium: Thuwunna Stadium; Referee: Mohammed Al-Jaberi (Iraq) |

| November 14 2027 AFC U-17 Asian Cup qualification | Myanmar | 3–1 | Philippines | Yangon, Myanmar |
| 15:00 UTC+7 | Thura Hein Htet 45+1'; Paing Zay Tun 52'; Thet Naing Oo 77' | Report | Müller 70' | Stadium: Thuwunna Stadium; Referee: Mouhammad Ebo (Syria) |

| November 20 2027 AFC U-17 Asian Cup qualification | Philippines | 2–2 | Afghanistan | Thanlyin, Myanmar |
| 15:00 UTC+7 | Paradies 12'; Müller 45+1' | Report | Dizon 68' (o.g.); Sadeqi 90+3' | Stadium: StarCity Sports Club Stadium; Referee: Clarence Leow Hong Wei (Singapore) |

== Coaching staff ==
=== Current coaching staff ===
As of April 16, 2026

| Position | Name |
|---|---|
| Head coach | (Spain) Joan Segura |
| Assistant coaches | (Philippines) Mark Hilay |
| Assistant coaches | (Philippines) Ryan Fermin |
| Goalkeeping coach | (Philippines) Anthony Albao |

=== Coaching history ===
List of head coaches of the Philippines U-17
| Country | Name | Period | Ref. |
|---|---|---|---|
| Philippines | Tomasito Ramos | 2009−2011 | |
| Philippines | Anto Gonzales | 2013 | |
| Philippines | Jose Maria Aberasturi | 2015−2016 | |
| Philippines | Roxy Dorlas | 2017 | |
| Philippines | Chieffy Caligdong | 2017 | |
| Japan | Reiji Hirata | 2018 | |
| Philippines | Roxy Dorlas | 2019 | |
| Japan | Reiji Hirata | 2022 | |
| Japan | Yuki Matsuda | 2024 | |
| Japan | Tetsuya Tsuchida | 2025 | |
| Spain | Joan Segura | 2026– | |

== Players ==
=== Current squad ===
The following 23 players were called up for the 2026 AFC U-17 Asian Cup qualification matches against Australia, Bhutan, Iraq, Jordan.

Caps and goals updated as of November 16, 2025.

| No. | Pos. | Player | Date of birth (age) | Caps | Goals | Club |
|---|---|---|---|---|---|---|
| 1 | GK | Jaime Sandejas | January 28, 2009 (aged 16) | 1 | 0 | (Royal Spanish Football Federation) EF Huesca |
| 12 | GK | Reign Deomampo | February 2, 2009 (aged 16) | 1 | 0 | (Philippine Football Federation) Southridge Admirals |
| 23 | GK | Brian Angrish | December 28, 2009 (aged 15) | 0 | 0 | (Canadian Soccer Association) Vaughan U17 |
| 2 | DF | Sebastian Luna | January 20, 2009 (aged 16) | 1 | 0 | (Philippine Football Federation) Perpetual Saints |
| 4 | DF | Alphan Lomibao | January 22, 2009 (aged 16) | 2 | 0 | (Philippine Football Federation) UST Golden Booters |
| 6 | DF | Leo Garcia | October 1, 2009 (aged 16) | 5 | 0 | (Philippine Football Federation) Southridge Admirals |
| 21 | DF | Frank Bacara | May 1, 2009 (aged 16) | 2 | 0 | (Philippine Football Federation) FEU–D Baby Tamaraws |
| 27 | DF | Zavier Castañares | August 27, 2009 (aged 16) | 2 | 0 | (Philippine Football Federation) San Beda Red Lions |
| | DF | Zechariah Casillano | November 28, 2009 (aged 15) | 0 | 0 | (Philippine Football Federation) Southridge Admirals |
| | DF | Rommy Dayandayan | | 0 | 0 | (Philippine Football Federation) Tuloy |
| | DF | Nathan Siao | | 0 | 0 | (Royal Spanish Football Federation) Villarreal Cadete B |
| | DF | Johann Wicklein | July 15, 2009 (aged 16) | 0 | 0 | (Royal Spanish Football Federation) Getafe Juvenil B |
| 5 | MF | Aarran Long | April 25, 2009 (aged 16) | 5 | 1 | (Philippine Football Federation) BSM Lions |
| 8 | MF | Manu Simpao | August 21, 2009 (aged 16) | 2 | 0 | (Philippine Football Federation) Ateneo Blue Booters |
| 10 | MF | Toby Paulino | March 3, 2009 (aged 16) | 5 | 0 | (Portuguese Football Federation) Académica U17 |
| 12 | MF | Lawrence Binalong | | 2 | 1 | (Philippine Football Federation) Tuloy |
| 14 | MF | Jordan Villanueva | January 6, 2009 (aged 16) | 0 | 0 | (United States Soccer Federation) Portland Timbers Academy |
| 30 | MF | Geoffrey Marqueses Jr. | July 1, 2009 (aged 16) | 1 | 0 | (Philippine Football Federation) DLSZ Junior Archers |
| | MF | Ryan Gocheco | | 0 | 0 | (Royal Spanish Football Federation) Marcet Football University |
| | MF | Ellai Siao | | 0 | 0 | (Royal Spanish Football Federation) Villarreal Cadete B |
| 7 | FW | Joshua Moleje | January 12, 2009 (aged 16) | 8 | 2 | (Royal Spanish Football Federation) Levante Academy |
| 11 | FW | Francis Poticano | January 21, 2009 (aged 16) | 4 | 0 | (Philippine Football Federation) Southridge Admirals |
| 77 | FW | Filbert Tacardon | May 13, 2009 (aged 16) | 7 | 0 | (Philippine Football Federation) Claret Red Roosters |

=== Recent call-ups ===
The following players have been called up for the team for the last 12 months.

| Pos. | Player | Date of birth (age) | Caps | Goals | Club | Latest call-up |
|---|---|---|---|---|---|---|
| GK | Mateo Veloso | March 19, 2009 (age 17) | 2 | 0 | (Philippines) Kaya FC Academy | 2025 AFC U-17 Asian Cup qualification |
| GK | Gianne Abara | March 27, 2008 (age 18) | 0 | 0 | (Philippines) Far Eastern University | 2025 AFC U-17 Asian Cup qualification |
| DF | Peter Mirasol | August 1, 2008 (age 18) | 3 | 0 | (Philippines) PFF Youth National Team | 2025 AFC U-17 Asian Cup qualification |
| DF | Zachary Dalman | December 17, 2008 (age 17) | 4 | 0 | (Philippines) Far Eastern University | 2025 AFC U-17 Asian Cup qualification |
| DF | Dylan Wong | March 15, 2008 (age 18) | 0 | 0 | (Philippines) Kaya FC Academy | 2025 AFC U-17 Asian Cup qualification |
| DF | Rain Sermeno | December 17, 2008 (age 17) | 0 | 0 | (Philippines) Far Eastern University | 2025 AFC U-17 Asian Cup qualification |
| DF | Michael Maniti | September 5, 2008 (age 18) | 7 | 0 | (Australia) Blacktown City | 2025 AFC U-17 Asian Cup qualification |
| DF | Luke Amann | October 9, 2008 (age 18) | 1 | 1 | (United States) Sporting Club Jacksonville | 2025 AFC U-17 Asian Cup qualification |
| DF | Enzo Panganiban | December 15, 2008 (age 17) | 4 | 0 | (Philippines) Manila Soccer Academy | 2025 AFC U-17 Asian Cup qualification |
| MF | Spencer Webster | October 10, 2008 (age 18) | 4 | 3 | (Australia) St George City | 2025 AFC U-17 Asian Cup qualification |
| MF | Matthew Steen | September 2, 2008 (age 18) | 4 | 1 | (Belgium) Diksmuide-Oostende | 2025 AFC U-17 Asian Cup qualification |
| MF | Bryant Sidney | June 23, 2008 (age 18) | 0 | 0 | (Philippines) Tuloy | 2025 AFC U-17 Asian Cup qualification |
| MF | Renz Partosa | August 29, 2008 (age 18) | 1 | 0 | (Philippines) De La Salle Zobel | 2025 AFC U-17 Asian Cup qualification |
| MF | Ramil Fraga | October 18, 2009 (age 17) | 0 | 0 | (Philippines) Kaya FC Academy | 2025 AFC U-17 Asian Cup qualification |
| FW | Anthony Moutzouris | May 29, 2008 (age 18) | 4 | 1 | (Australia) Blacktown City | 2025 AFC U-17 Asian Cup qualification |
| FW | Edvard Omitade | September 17, 2008 (age 18) | 4 | 1 | (Philippines) San Beda University | 2025 AFC U-17 Asian Cup qualification |
| FW | Anthony Elorde | December 2, 2008 (age 17) | 2 | 0 | (Philippines) Southpoint School | 2025 AFC U-17 Asian Cup qualification |
| FW | Sambher Abrenica | May 7, 2008 (age 18) | 1 | 1 | (Philippines) Far Eastern University | 2025 AFC U-17 Asian Cup qualification |

== Competitive record ==
=== FIFA U-17 World Cup ===
The Philippines' FIFA U-17 World Cup Record
| Year | Round | Position | GP | W | D | L | GS | GA |
|---|---|---|---|---|---|---|---|---|
| (China) 1985 | Did not qualify | | | | | | | |
| (Canada) 1987 | Did not enter | | | | | | | |
| (Scotland) 1989 | Did not enter | | | | | | | |
| (Italy) 1991 | Did not enter | | | | | | | |
| (Japan) 1993 | Withdrew | | | | | | | |
| (Ecuador) 1995 | Did not enter | | | | | | | |
| (Egypt) 1997 | Did not enter | | | | | | | |
| (New Zealand) 1999 | Withdrew | | | | | | | |
| (Trinidad and Tobago) 2001 | Did not qualify | | | | | | | |
| (Finland) 2003 | Did not qualify | | | | | | | |
| (Peru) 2005 | Did not qualify | | | | | | | |
| (South Korea) 2007 | Did not enter | | | | | | | |
| (Nigeria) 2009 | Withdrew | | | | | | | |
| (Mexico) 2011 | Did not qualify | | | | | | | |
| (United Arab Emirates) 2013 | Did not enter | | | | | | | |
| (Chile) 2015 | Did not qualify | | | | | | | |
| (India) 2017 | Did not qualify | | | | | | | |
| (Brazil) 2019 | Did not qualify | | | | | | | |
| (Peru) 2021 | Cancelled due to the COVID-19 pandemic | | | | | | | |
| (Indonesia) 2023 | Did not qualify | | | | | | | |
| (Qatar) 2025 | Did not qualify | | | | | | | |

=== AFC U-17 Asian Cup ===
The Philippines' AFC U-16 Championship Record
| Year | Round | Position | GP | W | D | L | GS | GA |
|---|---|---|---|---|---|---|---|---|
| (Qatar) 1985 | did not qualify | | | | | | | |
| (Qatar) 1986 | did not enter | | | | | | | |
| (Thailand) 1988 | did not enter | | | | | | | |
| (United Arab Emirates) 1990 | did not enter | | | | | | | |
| (Saudi Arabia) 1992 | withdrew | | | | | | | |
| (Qatar) 1994 | did not enter | | | | | | | |
| (Thailand) 1996 | did not enter | | | | | | | |
| (Qatar) 1998 | withdrew | | | | | | | |
| (Vietnam) 2000 | did not qualify | | | | | | | |
| (United Arab Emirates) 2002 | did not qualify | | | | | | | |
| (Japan) 2004 | did not qualify | | | | | | | |
| (Singapore) 2006 | did not enter | | | | | | | |
| (Uzbekistan) 2008 | withdrew | | | | | | | |
| (Uzbekistan) 2010 | did not qualify | | | | | | | |
| (Iran) 2012 | did not enter | | | | | | | |
| (Thailand) 2014 | did not qualify | | | | | | | |
| (India) 2016 | did not qualify | | | | | | | |
| (Malaysia) 2018 | did not qualify | | | | | | | |
| (Bahrain) 2020 | cancelled due to the COVID-19 pandemic | | | | | | | |
| (Thailand) 2023 | did not qualify | | | | | | | |
| (Saudi Arabia) 2025 | did not qualify | | | | | | | |
| (Saudi Arabia) 2026 | did not qualify | | | | | | | |

=== ASEAN U-16 Boys Championship ===
The Philippines' ASEAN U-16 Boys Championship Record
| Year | Round | Position | GP | W | D | L | GS | GA |
|---|---|---|---|---|---|---|---|---|
| (Malaysia) (Indonesia) 2002 | Group stage | 9th Place | 4 | 0 | 1 | 3 | 2 | 17 |
| (Thailand) 2005 | Did not enter | | | | | | | |
| (Vietnam) 2006 | Did not enter | | | | | | | |
| (Cambodia) 2007 | Did not enter | | | | | | | |
| (Indonesia) 2008 | Did not enter | | | | | | | |
| (Thailand) 2009 | Cancelled | | | | | | | |
| (Indonesia) 2010 | Did not enter | | | | | | | |
| (Laos) 2011 | Group stage | 10th Place | 4 | 0 | 0 | 4 | 2 | 19 |
| (Laos) 2012 | Did not enter | | | | | | | |
| (Myanmar) 2013 | Group stage | 9th Place | 4 | 1 | 0 | 3 | 1 | 10 |
| (Cambodia) 2015 | Group stage | 11th Place | 4 | 0 | 0 | 4 | 3 | 16 |
| (Cambodia) 2016 | Group stage | 11th Place | 5 | 0 | 2 | 3 | 6 | 18 |
| (Thailand) 2017 | Group stage | 10th Place | 5 | 1 | 1 | 3 | 2 | 13 |
| (Indonesia) 2018 | Group stage | 11th Place | 5 | 0 | 0 | 5 | 3 | 30 |
| (Thailand) 2019 | Group stage | 12th Place | 5 | 0 | 0 | 5 | 4 | 18 |
| (Indonesia) 2022 | Group stage | 9th Place | 3 | 1 | 0 | 2 | 2 | 8 |
| (Indonesia) 2024 | Group stage | 10th Place | 3 | 0 | 0 | 3 | 0 | 10 |
| (Indonesia) 2026 | Group stage | 10th Place | 3 | 1 | 0 | 2 | 6 | 10 |
| Total | | 10/16 | 42 | 4 | 4 | 37 | 31 | 169 |

=== Minor tournaments ===
Minor tournaments record
| Tournament | Round | Position | Pld | W | D | L | GF | GA |
|---|---|---|---|---|---|---|---|---|
| (Singapore) 2025 Lion City Cup | Round robin | 1st | 3 | 2 | 1 | 0 | 6 | 2 |

== See also ==
- Football in the Philippines
- Philippines national football team
- Philippines national under-23 football team
- Philippines national under-21 football team
- Philippines national under-19 football team
- Philippines women's national football team
- Philippines women's national under-19 football team
