= Aaron Long =

Aaron Long may refer to:

- Aaron Long (animator) (born 1990), Canadian animator and filmmaker
- Aaron Long (soccer) (born 1992), American soccer player
- Robert Aaron Long, perpetrator of the 2021 Atlanta spa shootings

== See also ==
- Aarran Long (born 2009), Filipino footballer
