= Zhang Chengrui =

Chinese footballer (born 2008)

Personal information
- Date of birth: 15 March 2008 (age 18)
- Place of birth: Ningde, Fujian, China
- Height: 1.75 m (5 ft 9 in)
- Position: Midfielder

Team information
- Current team: Dalian Yingbo
- Number: 37

Youth career
- Dalian Pro

Senior career*
Years	Team	Apps	(Gls)
2026–	Dalian Yingbo	1	(0)
2026–	→ Dalian Yingbo B (res.)	9	(0)

International career^{‡}
2024–2025	China U17	2	(1)
2026–	China U19		
- * Club domestic league appearances and goals as of 19 November 2026 ‡ National team caps and goals as of 18 June 2026

Zhang Chengrui (simplified Chinese: 张城瑞; traditional Chinese: 張城瑞; pinyin: Zhāng Chéngruì; born 15 March 2008) is a Chinese professional footballer who plays as a midfielder for Chinese Super League club Dalian Yingbo.

== Early life and youth career ==
Zhang was born on 15 March 2008. He started his career at Dongbei Road Primary School and grew up in the Dalian youth training system. He represented Dalian Pro youth teams and Dalian Football Association teams at various age levels. In 2019, he was selected for the national best lineup at a national summer camp event while representing his Primary School.

== Club career ==
=== Dalian FA ===
Zhang was registered with the Dalian Football Association after the dissolution of Dalian Pro.

=== Dalian Yingbo ===
On 3 February 2026, Zhang had joined Dalian Yingbo from Dalian FA on a free transfer. On 2 March 2026, Dalian Yingbo officially announced that Zhang, along with Jing Kuanjie, Xiao Lirong, and Zeng Junhao, had been promoted to the first team. He was assigned the number 37 shirt.

== International career ==
In 2024, Zhang was called up to the China U16 national team. In October 2024, during the U17 Asian Cup qualification, Zhang recorded three assists and one goal in a 9–0 victory over Maldives U17.

In 2025, Zhang was included in the China U17 squad for the 2025 AFC U-17 Asian Cup. On 6 April 2025, he scored in a 2–1 group stage loss to Uzbekistan U17. He made three appearances and scored one goal in the tournament.

In September 2025, Zhang scored in a 4–0 friendly win over Myanmar U18. In January 2026, he was called up to the China U19 national team. In September 2026, he was called up again to the China U19 team for a training camp.

== Career statistics ==
=== Club ===
As of 18 June 2026

Appearances and goals by club, season and competition
Club	Season	League			National cup		Continental		Other		Total	
Club	Season	Division	Apps	Goals	Apps	Goals	Apps	Goals	Apps	Goals	Apps	Goals
Dalian Yingbo B	2026	China League Two	8	0	0	0	—		—		8	0
Dalian Yingbo	2026	Chinese Super League	1	0	0	0	—		—		1	0
Career total			9	0	0	0	0	0	0	0	9	0

== Honours ==
Liaoning U18

- National Games of China Football Men's U18: 2025
