= Silva Mexes =

Thai footballer (born 2010)

Silva Mexes ซิลวา เม็กเซส
Personal information
- Full name: Silva Mexes Tyler-Earnshaw
- Date of birth: 15 March 2010 (age 16)
- Place of birth: Nottingham, England
- Height: 1.78 m (5 ft 10 in)
- Position: Left winger

Team information
- Current team: Leeds United

Youth career
- 2021–2024: Ipswich Town
- 2024–2026: Manchester United
- 2026–: Leeds United

International career
Years	Team	Apps	(Gls)
2025–	Thailand U17	3	(1)

Silva Mexes Tyler-Earnshaw (Thai: ซิลวา เม็กเซส ไทเลอร์-เอิร์นชอว์; born 15 March 2010) is a footballer who plays as a left-winger for club Leeds United. Born in England, he is a youth international for Thailand.

== Early life ==
Born in England, Mexes' parents are former Welsh international footballer Robert Earnshaw and Tiffany Tyler, who has lineage from Nakhon Sawan, Thailand.

== Club career ==
In March 2024, it was reported by The Secret Scout that Mexes was close to joining Manchester United from Ipswich Town. This move was confirmed in May of the same year by Mexes himself, posting a photo of him signing a deal with the Red Devils on his Instagram account.

== International career ==
Of Zambian descent through his father, and Thai descent through his mother, Mexes pledged his international allegiance to the latter nation in early 2025, having trained with the Thailand under-17 side in the same year. He is not eligible to represent Wales, the nation his father featured fifty-nine times for, as his father was not born in the nation.

Called up to the Thailand squad for the 2025 AFC U-17 Asian Cup by manager Jadet Meelarp, Mexes scored a consolation goal in a 4–1 loss to eventual tournament winners Uzbekistan in the competitions opening game.

== Style of play ==
A left-winger, Mexes was also a 100m sprinter as a child, and was an under-13 champion in Essex. He is one of the fastest footballers worldwide, running the 100m sprint in 11.1 seconds.
