= Reiji Hirata =

Japanese football manager

Personal information
- Date of birth: June 26, 1975 (age 51)
- Place of birth: Japan

Managerial career
- Years: Team
- 1997–1998: Cerezo Osaka (youth)
- 2009–2014: Gifu (academy director)
- 2014: Chinese Taipei (technical director)
- 2015: Chinese Taipei U13
- 2017: Chinese Taipei
- 2017: Chinese Taipei U16
- 2018: Philippines U19
- 2018: Philippines U17
- 2023-: Japan U15

Reiji Hirata (Japanese: 平田 礼次; born in Japan) is a Japanese football manager. He is the current manager of the Japan national under-15 football team.

== Career ==
=== Chinese Taipei U16 ===
Hirata started his managerial career with the Chinese Taipei national under-16 football team.

=== Chinese Taipei ===
In 2017, he was appointed head coach of the Chinese Taipei national football team, a position he held until 2017.

=== Philippines youth ===
In 2018, he was appointed as the Head of Youth Development of Philippine Football Federation.

==== Philippines U-19 ====
Hirata coached the Philippines U-19 in the 2018 AFF U-19 Youth Championship held in Indonesia.

==== Philippines U-17 ====
A month later, Hirata led the Philippines U-17 in the 2018 AFF U-16 Youth Championship. The tournament was also held in Indonesia.
