= Wei Xiangxin =

Chinese footballer (born 2008)

Personal information
- Date of birth: 5 March 2008 (age 18)
- Place of birth: Meizhou, Guangdong, China
- Height: 1.80 m (5 ft 11 in)
- Position: Forward

Team information
- Current team: Auxerre
- Number: 49

Youth career
- 2017–2024: Meizhou Hakka

Senior career*
Years	Team	Apps	(Gls)
2024	Guangdong Mingtu	8	(7)
2025–2026	Meizhou Hakka	28	(1)
2026–	Auxerre	0	(0)
2026–	Auxerre B	4	(1)

International career
2024–2025	China U17	12	(9)
2026–	China U19	1	(0)
- * Club domestic league appearances and goals as of 28 August 2025

Wei Xiangxin (Chinese: 魏祥鑫; born 5 March 2008) is a Chinese professional footballer who plays as a forward for Ligue 1 club Auxerre.

== Early life ==
Born in Meizhou in the Chinese province of Guangdong, Wei was raised by his grandparents as his parents worked in Guangzhou and Shenzhen.

== Club career ==
Wei first took an interest in football in third grade, before joining a sports school in Wuhua County. He joined the academy of Meizhou Hakka, where he played between under-10 and under-11 age groups, before representing the province of Guangdong at the National Games of China. He joined Guangdong Mingtu for the 2024 season of the Chinese Champions League, helping the club earn promotion to China League Two.

On 1 March 2025, Wei made his debut for Meizhou Hakka in the Chinese Super League, coming on as a late substitute for Yang Chaosheng in a 2–1 win against Henan FC. In doing so, he became the first player born in 2008 to play in the league. In just his second professional appearance, he scored his first goal for the club: a penalty in an eventual 2–2 draw with Zhejiang on 16 April. Later in the same month, he was invited to trial with Chinese-owned French club Auxerre.

On 23 November 2025, one day after Meizhou Hakka's relegation to China League One, it was announced that Wei was set to join Ligue 1 side Auxerre on 1 July 2026. On 1 July 2026, Wei officially joined AJ Auxerre.

== International career ==
Wei represented the China under-16 side at the Peace Cup held in Shenyang in August 2024, scoring twice against Vietnam, before notching against Uzbekistan in a 2–1 win, helping his side win the competition. He first rose to prominence on the international stage during 2025 AFC U-17 Asian Cup qualification, helping China to qualify for the tournament proper with four goals in five games.

At the 2025 AFC U-17 Asian Cup, Wei scored a consolation goal in his side's 2–1 loss to Saudi Arabia. After China were knocked out of the competition in the group stage, Wei stated in an interview with the Xinhua News Agency that the experience had helped him "really feel the gap" between China and other Asian nations, and that China needed to play against strong foreign countries more often in order to "improve our skills and tactics faster and adapt to high intensity and fast pace".

== Career statistics ==
As of 22 November 2025.

Appearances and goals by club, season and competition
Club	Season	League			Cup		Continental		Other		Total	
Club	Season	Division	Apps	Goals	Apps	Goals	Apps	Goals	Apps	Goals	Apps	Goals
Guangdong Mingtu	2024	Chinese Champions League	8	7	0	0	—		—		8	7
Meizhou Hakka	2025	Chinese Super League	17	1	0	0	—		—		17	1
Career total			25	8	0	0	0	0	0	0	25	8
