= Aarran Long =

Filipino footballer

Personal information
- Full name: Aarran Thomas Dimapilis Long
- Date of birth: April 25, 2009 (age 17)
- Place of birth: Zamboanga City, Philippines
- Position: Forward

Team information
- Current team: Philippines

Youth career
- 2015–: BSM Lions

International career^{‡}
Years	Team	Apps	(Gls)
2024–2025	Philippines U16	6	(3)
2025–2026	Philippines U17	7	(6)
2026–	Philippines	1	(0)
- ‡ National team caps and goals as of 14:47, 3 August 2026 (UTC)

Aarran Thomas Dimapilis Long (born 25 April 2009) is a Filipino footballer who plays as a forward for the BSM Lions and the Philippines national team.

== Early life ==
Long attends the British School Manila, where he plays for their BSM Lions team.

== International career ==
Long was born in the Philippines to a Scottish father. He was the top scorer for the Philippines U16s at the Lion City Cup in 2023. He was called up to the Philippines U17s for the 2026 AFC U-17 Asian Cup qualifiers in November 2025. In July 2026, Long he was called up to the Philippines national team for the 2026 ASEAN Championship
