= Minato Yoshida =

Japanese footballer (born 2006)

Minato Yoshida 吉田 湊海
- Yoshida with Kashima Antlers in 2026

Personal information
- Date of birth: 15 July 2008 (age 18)
- Place of birth: Yamato, Kanagawa, Japan
- Height: 1.71 m (5 ft 7 in)
- Position: Forward

Team information
- Current team: Kashima Antlers
- Number: 30

Youth career
- –2020: JFC Futuro
- 2021–2023: FC Tama
- 2024–2026: Kashima Antlers

Senior career*
Years	Team	Apps	(Gls)
2025–	Kashima Antlers	9	(0)

International career^{‡}
2023	Japan U15	5	(3)
2024	Japan U16	8	(6)
2024–	Japan U17	19	(6)
- * Club domestic league appearances and goals as of 21 October 2026 ‡ National team caps and goals as of 21 November 2025

Minato Yoshida (吉田 湊海, Yoshida Minato; born 15 July 2008) is a Japanese professional footballer who plays as a forward for J1 League club Kashima Antlers.

== Early life ==
Yoshida was born on 15 July 2008 in Kanagawa Prefecture, Japan. Growing up, he played as a midfielder before switching to forward in middle school.

== Club career ==
As a youth player, Yoshida joined the youth academy of FC Tama. Following his stint there, he joined the youth academy of Kashima Antlers, helping the club's under-18 team win the 2025 Japan Club Youth U-18 Football Championship and was promoted to the club's senior team in 2025.

== International career ==
Yoshida is a Japan youth international. During November 2025, he played for the Japan national under-17 football team at the 2025 FIFA U-17 World Cup.

== Personal life ==
Yoshida has a younger brother, Ryuto, who is currently a member of Kawasaki Frontale U-18 team.

== Career statistics ==
As of 21 October 2026.

Appearances and goals by club, season and competition
Club	Season	League			National cup (Note: Includes Emperor's Cup)		Continental		Total	
Club	Season	Division	Apps	Goals	Apps	Goals	Apps	Goals	Apps	Goals
Kashima Antlers	2025	J1 League	1	0	0	0	0	0	1	0
Kashima Antlers	2026	J1 (100)	1	0	–		0	0	1	0
Kashima Antlers	2026–27	J1 League	7	0	2	1	1 (Note: Appearances in AFC Champions League Elite)	0	10	1
Kashima Antlers	Total		9	0	2	1	1	0	12	1
Career total			9	0	2	1	1	0	12	1
