= Sadriddin Khasanov =

Uzbekistani footballer (born 2008)

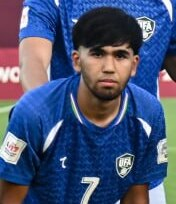

Personal information
- Full name: Sadriddin Zayniddin oʻgʻli Hasanov
- Date of birth: 21 May 2008 (age 18)
- Place of birth: Uzbekistan
- Height: 1.76 m (5 ft 9 in)
- Position: Winger

Team information
- Current team: Braga U23

Youth career
- Bunyodkor
- 2026–: Braga U23

Senior career*
Years	Team	Apps	(Gls)
2026	Bunyodkor	6	(0)

International career^{‡}
2022	Uzbekistan U15	4	(1)
2024	Uzbekistan U16	7	(2)
2024–2025	Uzbekistan U17	29	(10)
2026–	Uzbekistan U20	4	(0)
- * Club domestic league appearances and goals ‡ National team caps and goals as of 19 May 2026

Sadriddin Khasanov (Uzbek: Садриддин Хасанов; born 21 May 2008) is an Uzbekistani professional footballer who plays as a winger for the Under-23 squad of Portuguese club Braga.

== Club career ==
As a youth player, Khasanov joined the youth academy of Bunyodkor.

Khasanov made his debut for Bunyodkor on 6 March 2026, coming on as a substitute in the 62nd minute of the match against Dynamo Samarkand in the 2nd round of the 2026 Uzbekistan Football Championship. In total, he played 6 matches in the championship and 1 match in the Uzbekistan Cup for Bunyodkor.

On 9 July 2026, Khasanov signed a contract with Primeira Liga club Braga. He was assigned to their Under-23 squad.

== International career ==
Khasanov is an Uzbekistan youth international. During April 2025, he played for the Uzbekistan national under-17 football team at the 2025 AFC U-17 Asian Cup.

== Style of play ==
Khasanov plays as a winger. English newspaper The Guardian wrote in 2025 that he "likes to cut inside from the left, fast, strong, with an eye for goal... also appears to have a winning mentality".

== Honours ==
Uzbekistan U17

- AFC U-17 Asian Cup: 2025
