= Trần Gia Bảo =

Vietnamese footballer (born 2008)

Personal information
- Full name: Trần Gia Bảo
- Date of birth: 3 January 2008 (age 18)
- Place of birth: Lâm Đồng, Vietnam
- Height: 1.80 m (5 ft 11 in)
- Position: Forward

Team information
- Current team: Hoàng Anh Gia Lai
- Number: 16

Youth career
- 2022–2024: Hoàng Anh Gia Lai

Senior career*
| Years | Team | Apps | (Gls) |
| 2024– | Hoàng Anh Gia Lai | 38 | (5) |

International career^{‡}
| 2024–2025 | Vietnam U17 | 15 | (3) |
| 2026– | Vietnam U20 | 3 | (0) |
| 2026– | Vietnam U23 | 3 | (0) |
- * Club domestic league appearances and goals as of 20 November 2026 ‡ National team caps and goals as of 14 November 2026

Trần Gia Bảo (born 3 January 2008) is a Vietnamese professional footballer who plays as a forward for V.League 1 club Hoàng Anh Gia Lai. He is currently the youngest player to appear and to score in the history of V.League 1.

In 2025, Gia Bảo was named by English newspaper The Guardian as one of the best players born in 2008 worldwide.

== Early career ==
Born in Lâm Đồng, Gia Bảo is a youth product of the Hoàng Anh Gia Lai academy. In 2024, as the captain of the under-17 side of Hoàng Anh Gia Lai, he led the team to the Vietnamese National U-17 Championship final, but they were defeated by Hà Nội.

== Club career ==
At the age of 16, Gia Bảo was promoted to Hoàng Anh Gia Lai first team. On 15 September 2024, he made his professional debut in the first matchday of the 2024–25 V.League 1 against Quảng Nam. He entried the field as a substitute player in the 70th minute and scored a goal in the additional time, contributing in his team's 4–0 win. At 16 years old, 8 months and 12 days, he became the youngest player to appear and to score in a V.League 1 game.

On 13 September 2025, Gia Bảo made his first appearance in the Vietnamese Cup and scored a goal to help Hoàng Anh Gia Lai defeat Đồng Á Thanh Hóa 2–0, helping the team advance to the Round of 16.

== International career ==
In June 2024, Gia Bảo took part in the 2024 ASEAN U-16 Boys Championship with Vietnam under-16s. He scored a goal during the tournament as Vietnam finished in the fourth place.

== Playing style ==
Gia Bảo is a versatile player. He can play in every position in the attack, and can also operate as an attacking midfielder.

== Career statistics ==
As of match played 20 November 2026

Appearances and goals by club, season and competition
| Club | Season | League | | | Cup | | Continental | | Other | | Total | |
| Club | Season | Division | Apps | Goals | Apps | Goals | Apps | Goals | Apps | Goals | Apps | Goals |
|---|---|---|---|---|---|---|---|---|---|---|---|---|
| Hoàng Anh Gia Lai | 2024–25 | V.League 1 | 9 | 1 | 0 | 0 | — | | — | | 9 | 1 |
| Hoàng Anh Gia Lai | 2025–26 | V.League 1 | 22 | 3 | 1 | 1 | — | | — | | 23 | 4 |
| Hoàng Anh Gia Lai | 2026–27 | V.League 1 | 7 | 1 | 1 | 0 | — | | — | | 8 | 1 |
| Career total | | | 38 | 5 | 2 | 1 | 0 | 0 | 0 | 0 | 40 | 6 |

== Honours ==
Vietnam U23

- Gia Lai U-23 VTV Cup: 2026
