= Daichi Tani =

Japanese footballer (born 2008)

Daichi Tani 谷 大地
Personal information
- Date of birth: 1 July 2008 (age 18)
- Place of birth: South Korea
- Height: 1.85 m (6 ft 1 in)
- Position: Forward

Team information
- Current team: Sagan Tosu

Youth career
- –2023: FC Seoul
- 2023–: Sagan Tosu

International career^{‡}
| Years | Team | Apps | (Gls) |
| 2024– | Japan U17 | 5 | (4) |
- ‡ National team caps and goals as of 7 September 2025

Daichi Tani (Japanese: 谷大地; Korean: 김도윤, Kim Do-yun; born 1 July 2008) is a professional footballer who plays as a forward for Sagan Tosu. Born in South Korea, he is a Japan youth international.

== Early life ==
Tani was born on 1 July 2008 in South Korea. The son of Japanese singer Rumiko Tani and South Korean singer Kim Jung-min, he regarded Poland international Robert Lewandowski as his football idol.

== Club career ==
As a youth player, Tani joined the youth academy of South Korean side FC Seoul. Following his stint there, he joined the youth academy of Japanese side Sagan Tosu in 2023.

== International career ==
Tani is a Japan youth international. During April 2025, he played for the Japan national under-17 football team at the 2025 AFC U-20 Asian Cup.

== Style of play ==
Tani plays as a forward. South Korean newspaper The Chosun Ilbo wrote in 2025 that he "possesses exceptional football instincts. His speed allows him to excel in dribbling and passing, and he also possesses the finishing ability of a striker".
