= 2012 AFC U-16 Championship qualification =

The qualification for the 2012 AFC U-16 Championship.

== Format ==
Forty teams have entered the fray for this edition of the tournament and have been divided into two zones – West (22) and East (18). The teams will be divided into seven groups of six and five teams each.

West Zone will have two groups of six and two of five teams while East will have three groups of six teams each.

Top two teams from each of the groups and best third team from West and East zones will qualify for the tournament.

== Seedings ==
The draw for the 2012 AFC U-16 Championship qualification took place at AFC House on 30 March 2011.

West Asia
(Ranked 1st to 22nd)
1. Uzbekistan
2. United Arab Emirates
3. Syria
4. Iraq
5. Iran
6. Kuwait
7. Tajikistan
8. Oman
9. Saudi Arabia
10. Bahrain
11. Yemen
12. Bangladesh
13. Qatar
14. Nepal
15. Kyrgyzstan
16. Pakistan
17. India
18. Afghanistan
19. Lebanon (W)
20. Palestine
21. Maldives
22. Sri Lanka (W)
East Asia
(Ranked 1st to 18th)
1. North Korea
2. Australia
3. Japan
4. Indonesia
5. Vietnam
6. China
7. Timor-Leste
8. Chinese Taipei
9. Thailand
10. Laos
11. Hong Kong
12. Singapore
13. South Korea
14. Myanmar
15. Malaysia
16. Guam
17. Cambodia
18. Macau (W)

Five teams decided not to enter the qualifiers: Bhutan, Jordan, Mongolia, Philippines, Turkmenistan. Brunei was suspended at the time of the draw by FIFA.

Sri Lanka were drawn into Group A but withdrew

Lebanon were drawn into Group D but withdrew

Macau were drawn into Group E but withdrew

== Groups ==
=== Group A ===
All matches were held in Duhok, Iraq (UTC+3).

Team	Pld	W	D	L	GF	GA	GD	Pts
Iraq (H)	4	3	1	0	17	2	+15	10
Iran	4	3	1	0	12	1	+11	10
Qatar	4	2	0	2	9	6	+3	6
Palestine	4	1	0	3	2	15	−13	3
Bangladesh	4	0	0	4	0	16	−16	0
Sri Lanka	withdrew							

12 September 2011
14:00

Bangladesh	0–7	Iraq
	Report	Emon 8' (o.g.); Al-Mahdawi 4', 37', 66'; Ali Mhawi 25'; Karim 27'; Rasan 45'

Duhok Stadium, Duhok
Attendance: 1,500
Referee: Abdulshaheed Hasan Mohamed (Bahrain)
12 September 2011
17:00

Iran	5–0	Palestine
Karmollachaab 2'; Rigi 37'; Yasini 58'; Jaferi 78'; Nouri 87'	Report

Duhok Stadium, Duhok
Attendance: 500
Referee: Arumughan Rowan (India)

14 September 2011
14:00

Iraq	6–0	Palestine
Al-Mahdawi 27', 57'; Karim 30'; Ali Mhawi 85'; Al Daoos 89' (pen.); Lateef 90+3'	Report

Duhok Stadium, Duhok
Attendance: 700
Referee: Naser Al Ghafary (Jordan)
14 September 2011
17:00

Iran	3–0	Qatar
Bazaj 84'; Rigi 32', 47'	Report

Duhok Stadium, Duhok
Attendance: 300
Referee: Yaqoob Said Abdullah Abdul Baqi (Oman)

16 September 2011
14:00

Palestine	2–0	Bangladesh
Salah 53'; R. Dari 68' (pen.)	Report

Duhok Stadium, Duhok
Attendance: 200
Referee: Hamad Abdullah Hashimi (United Arab Emirates)
16 September 2011
17:00

Iraq	3–1	Qatar
Al-Mahdawi 2'; Bani 45'; Abdul-Zahra 63'	Report	Al Salemi 33'

Duhok Stadium, Duhok
Attendance: 3,100
Referee: Naser Al Ghafary (Jordan)

18 September 2011
14:00

Qatar	4–0	Palestine
Al-Jalabi 5', 76'; Hassanin 13'; Al Ahrak 33'	Report

Duhok Stadium, Duhok
Attendance: 100
Referee: Abdulshaheed Hasan Mohamed (Bahrain)
18 September 2011
17:00

Iran	3–0	Bangladesh
Estakhri 30'; Hosseini 76'; Karmollachaab 81'	Report

Duhok Stadium, Duhok
Attendance: 100
Referee: Arumughan Rowan (India)

20 September 2011
14:00

Bangladesh	0–4	Qatar
	Report	Mohamed 39'; Afif 43', 90+1'; Al-Jalabi 51'

Duhok Stadium, Duhok
Attendance: 100
Referee: Hamad Abdullah Hashimi (United Arab Emirates)
20 September 2011
17:00

Iraq	1–1	Iran
Rasan 43'	Report	Jaferi 42'

Duhok Stadium, Duhok
Attendance: 3,000
Referee: Yaqoob Said Abdullah Abdul Baqi (Oman)

=== Group B ===
All matches were held in Kuwait City and Hawally, Kuwait (UTC+3).

Team	Pld	W	D	L	GF	GA	GD	Pts
Yemen	5	4	1	0	15	2	+13	13
Kuwait (H)	5	4	0	1	14	3	+11	12
United Arab Emirates	5	3	1	1	13	4	+9	10
Pakistan	5	2	0	3	7	9	−2	6
Afghanistan	5	1	0	4	10	12	−2	3
Maldives	5	0	0	5	0	29	−29	0

12 September 2011
18:30

Yemen	1–1	United Arab Emirates
Al Dahi 62'	Report	Sulaiman 7' (pen.)

Mohammed Al-Hamad Stadium, Hawally
Attendance: 50
Referee: Dmitriy Mashentsev (Kyrgyzstan)
12 September 2011
18:30

Kuwait	3 – 0 Awarded	Afghanistan
Al Asfour 82' (pen.)	Report	M. Zaher 37'

Sabah Al Salem Stadium, Kuwait City
Attendance: 200
Referee: Ibrahim Al Hosni (Oman)
12 September 2011
21:30

Pakistan	4–0	Maldives
Bilal 11'; Khan 13'; S. Ali 62'; R. Ali 67'	Report

Sabah Al Salem Stadium, Kuwait City
Attendance: 61
Referee: Ali Sabah Al-Qaysi (Iraq)

14 September 2011
18:30

United Arab Emirates	3 – 0 Awarded	Afghanistan
A. Harasi 38'	Report	Muhammad Amin 65' (pen.)

Mohammed Al-Hamad Stadium, Hawally
Attendance: 350
Referee: Khamis Al Marri (Qatar)
14 September 2011
18:30

Kuwait	2–0	Pakistan
Bourslee 8'; Haider 51'	Report

Sabah Al Salem Stadium, Kuwait City
Attendance: 400
Referee: Vadim Agishev (Uzbekistan)
14 September 2011
21:30

Yemen	5–0	Maldives
Fadaaq 21', 64'; Aiman Abdulkafi Ahmed 34'; Al-Dahi 40'; Mohamed 74' (o.g.)	Report

Sabah Al Salem Stadium, Kuwait City
Attendance: 50
Referee: Timur Faizullin (Kyrgyzstan)

17 September 2011
18:30

Maldives	0–5	Kuwait
	Report	Salem 38', 75'; Haider 49'; Al Enezi 89'; Al Hajri 90+2'

Sabah Al Salem Stadium, Kuwait City
Attendance: 100
Referee: Ibrahim Al Hosni (Oman)
17 September 2011
18:30

United Arab Emirates	2–0	Pakistan
Sulaiman 32', 79'	Report

Mohammed Al-Hamad Stadium, Hawally
Attendance: 150
Referee: Ali Sabah Al-Qaysi (Iraq)
17 September 2011
21:30

Afghanistan	0 – 3 Awarded	Yemen
Rezaie 68'; Amin 78'	Report	G. Ahmed 6'

Sabah Al Salem Stadium, Kuwait City
Attendance: 1,500
Referee: Dmitriy Mashentsev (Kyrgyzstan)

19 September 2011
18:30

Maldives	0–6	United Arab Emirates
	Report	Sulaiman 4' (pen.), 33' (pen.); Al Harasi 6', 68'; Moosa 65' (o.g.); Mohammad 70'

Mohammed Al-Hamad Stadium, Hawally
Attendance: 15
Referee: Vadim Agishev (Uzbekistan)
19 September 2011
18:30

Kuwait	1–2	Yemen
Marzouq 90+4'	Report	Al-Haidari 1'; Al-Dahi 90+3'

Sabah Al Salem Stadium, Kuwait City
Attendance: 250
Referee: Khamis Al Marri (Qatar)
19 September 2011
21:30

Pakistan	3–1	Afghanistan
Bilal 45+4'; Khan 73', 84'	Report	Amin 54' (pen.)

Sabah Al Salem Stadium, Kuwait City
Attendance: 1,900
Referee: Timur Faizullin (Kyrgyzstan)

22 September 2011
18:30

Yemen	4–0	Pakistan
Al-Dahi 41' (pen.), 72' (pen.); Saif Ahmed 50'; Abdulrab Ahmed 84'	Report

Mohammed Al-Hamad Stadium, Hawally
Attendance: 1,000
Referee: Ibrahim Al Hosni (Oman)
22 September 2011
18:30

United Arab Emirates	1–3	Kuwait
Sulaiman 9'	Report	Marzouq 44'; Alajmi 49'; Bourslee 89'

Sabah Al Salem Stadium, Kuwait City
Attendance: 800
Referee: Dmitriy Mashentsev (Kyrgyzstan)
22 September 2011
21:30

Afghanistan	9–0	Maldives
Zamen 39', 51', 61', 74', 90+2'; Rezaie 56', 76'; Hussain 79'	Report

Mohammed Al-Hamad Stadium, Hawally
Attendance: 1,200
Referee: Ali Sabah Al-Qaysi (Iraq)

=== Group C ===
All matches were held in Tashkent, Uzbekistan (UTC+5).

Team	Pld	W	D	L	GF	GA	GD	Pts
Uzbekistan (H)	4	4	0	0	20	1	+19	12
India	4	3	0	1	13	11	+2	9
Bahrain	4	1	1	2	7	7	0	4
Tajikistan	4	1	1	2	6	8	−2	4
Kyrgyzstan	4	0	0	4	1	20	−19	0

1 October 2011
11:30

Bahrain	2–2	Tajikistan
Al Shaikh 52'; Al Hassouni 72'	Report	Tursunov 53'; Barotov 88'

TTYMI Stadium, Tashkent
Attendance: 123
Referee: Ko Hyung-Jin (Korea Republic)
1 October 2011
16:00

India	7–0	Kyrgyzstan
Rai 5', 7', 45', 55', 85'; Lalhlimpuia 17', 42'	Report

TTYMI Stadium, Tashkent
Attendance: 100
Referee: Mohammad Salem Al-Rshaidat (Jordan)

3 October 2011
11:30

Kyrgyzstan	0–7	Uzbekistan
	Report	Abbasov 9', 44', 51'; Davlatov 16'; Ib. Abdullaev 27'; Boltboev 42'; Iz. Abdullaev 72'

TTYMI Stadium, Tashkent
Attendance: 500
Referee: Masoud Tufaylieh (Syria)
3 October 2011
16:00

India	2–1	Bahrain
Raja 50'; Sezie 73' (pen.)	Report	Marhoon 21'

TTYMI Stadium, Tashkent
Attendance: 150
Referee: Charymurat Kurbanov (Turkmenistan)

5 October 2011
11:30

Uzbekistan	9–0	India
Abbasov 19', 45+1', 61', 68'; Odilov 26', 27', 30'; Ib. Abdullaev 41'; Mirzaev 67'	Report

TTYMI Stadium, Tashkent
Attendance: 723
Referee: Yousef Al-Marzouq (Kuwait)
5 October 2011
16:00

Tajikistan	2–0	Kyrgyzstan
Tursunov 17'; Juraboev 33'	Report

TTYMI Stadium, Tashkent
Attendance: 200
Referee: Mohammad Salem Al-Rshaidat (Jordan)

7 October 2011
11:30

Tajikistan	1–4	India
Tursunov 17' (pen.)	Report	Khiangte 26'; Rai 43'; Golui 61'; Lalhlimpuia 90+1'

TTYMI Stadium, Tashkent
Attendance: 100
Referee: Ko Hyung-Jin (Korea Republic)
7 October 2011
16:00

Bahrain	0–2	Uzbekistan
	Report	Khamdamov 45+2'; Ib. Abdullaev 49'

TTYMI Stadium, Tashkent
Attendance: 400
Referee: Masoud Tufaylieh (Syria)

9 October 2011
11:30

Kyrgyzstan	1–4	Bahrain
Cheshev 54'	Report	Obaid 8'; Marhoon 39'; Mohamed 63' (pen.); Isa 85'

TTYMI Stadium, Tashkent
Attendance: 50
Referee: Charymurat Kurbanov (Turkmenistan)
9 October 2011
16:00

Uzbekistan	2–1	Tajikistan
M. Ismoilov 20'; Odilov 36'	Report	Barotov 53'

TTYMI Stadium, Tashkent
Attendance: 200
Referee: Yousef Al-Marzouq (Kuwait)

=== Group D ===
All matches were held in Kathmandu, Nepal (UTC+5:45).

Team	Pld	W	D	L	GF	GA	GD	Pts
Oman	3	2	0	1	4	4	0	6
Syria	3	2	0	1	5	3	+2	6
Saudi Arabia	3	1	1	1	5	3	+2	4
Nepal (H)	3	0	1	2	1	5	−4	1
Lebanon	withdrew							

12 September 2011
15:00

Syria	2–0	Nepal
Ashqar 2'; Al-Hammoud 83'	Report

Dasarath Rangasala Stadium, Kathmandu
Attendance: 1,700
Referee: Jameel Abdulhusain Mohamed (Bahrain)
12 September 2011
15:00

Oman	0–3	Saudi Arabia
	Report	Al-Nabit 34'; Al-Qhtani 59'; Ghazwani 62'

Halchowk Stadium, Kathmandu
Attendance: 2,000
Referee: Vladislav Tseytlin (Uzbekistan)

14 September 2011
15:00

Nepal	0–2	Oman
	Report	Al-Rushadi 78'; Al-Alawi 87'

Dasarath Rangasala Stadium, Kathmandu
Attendance: 3,000
Referee: Yadollah Jahanbazi (Iran)
14 September 2011
15:00

Saudi Arabia	1–2	Syria
Hazazi 25'	Report	Salkeni 4'; Alkhaled 69'

Halchowk Stadium, Kathmandu
Attendance: 50
Referee: Ali Shaban (Kuwait)

16 September 2011
15:00

Syria	1–2	Oman
Mshhdani 67'	Report	Mubarak 9'; Jniat 12' (o.g.)

Halchowk Stadium, Kathmandu
Attendance: 500
Referee: Nivon Robesh Gamini (Sri Lanka)
16 September 2011
15:00

Saudi Arabia	1–1	Nepal
Ahmed 13'	Report	Heman 34'

Dasarath Rangasala Stadium, Kathmandu
Attendance: 400
Referee: Jameel Abdulhusain Mohamed (Bahrain)

=== Group E ===
All matches were held in Pyongyang, North Korea (UTC+9).

Team	Pld	W	D	L	GF	GA	GD	Pts
North Korea (H)	4	4	0	0	16	2	+14	12
China	4	3	0	1	8	3	+5	9
Singapore	4	1	1	2	10	6	+4	4
Malaysia	4	1	1	2	5	7	−2	4
Timor-Leste	4	0	0	4	3	24	−21	0
Macau	withdrew							

8 September 2011
13:00

China	3–1	Malaysia
Wang Jinxian 18'; Zhang Xiuwei 58'; Chen Kerui 69'	Report	Akram 77'

Kim Il-sung Stadium, Pyongyang
Attendance: 4,500
Referee: Prathan Nasawang (Thailand)
8 September 2011
17:00

Timor-Leste	2–11	North Korea
Januário 45+1'; Francyatma 80'	Report	Ri Kwang-Song 8', 52'; Choe Ju-song 12', 50', 6', 69'; Ri Ryong 28', 32'; Kim Il-Jin 71', 74', 77'

Kim Il-sung Stadium, Pyongyang
Attendance: 10,000
Referee: Phùng Đình Dũng (Vietnam)

10 September 2011
13:00

China	3–1	Singapore
Wang Jinxian 13'; Li Xiaoming 69'; Zhang Xiuwei 90+3'	Report	Adam 17' (pen.)

Kim Il-sung Stadium, Pyongyang
Attendance: 4,000
Referee: Abdul Hannan Miron (Bangladesh)
10 September 2011
17:00

North Korea	3–0	Malaysia
Jon Kum-Song 20' (pen.); Choe Ju-song 37', 57'	Report

Kim Il-sung Stadium, Pyongyang
Attendance: 12,300
Referee: Pratap Singh (India)

13 September 2011
13:00

Malaysia	3–0	Timor-Leste
Raphi 45+1'; Akram 74'; Hakimi 88'	Report

Kim Il-sung Stadium, Pyongyang
Attendance: 3,000
Referee: Yu Ming-Hsun (Chinese Taipei)
13 September 2011
17:00

North Korea	1–0	Singapore
Ri Kwang Song 89'	Report

Kim Il-sung Stadium, Pyongyang
Attendance: 10,000
Referee: Abdul Hannan Miron (Bangladesh)

15 September 2011
13:00

China	2–0	Timor-Leste
Liu Hao 23' (pen.); Wang Jinxian 35'	Report

Kim Il-sung Stadium, Pyongyang
Attendance: 2,000
Referee: Phùng Đình Dũng (Vietnam)
15 September 2011
17:00

Singapore	1–1	Malaysia
Amirul 56'	Report	Akram 31'

Kim Il-sung Stadium, Pyongyang
Attendance: 4,500
Referee: Yu Ming Hsun (Chinese Taipei)

18 September 2011
13:00

Timor-Leste	1–8	Singapore
Januário 20'	Report	Zulfadhmi 4'; Adam 39', 45+1', 79'; Mahathir 54'; Azhar 77', 78'; Abd Rahman 87'

Kim Il-sung Stadium, Pyongyang
Attendance: 4,500
Referee: Abdul Hannan Miron (Bangladesh)
18 September 2011
17:00

North Korea	1–0	China
Ri Kwang-Song 90+2'	Report

Kim Il-sung Stadium, Pyongyang
Attendance: 21,000
Referee: Pratap Singh (India)

=== Group F ===
All matches were held in Vientiane, Laos (UTC+7).

Team	Pld	W	D	L	GF	GA	GD	Pts
Japan	5	4	0	1	21	6	+15	12
South Korea	5	3	2	0	23	3	+20	11
Laos (H)	5	3	1	1	13	6	+7	10
Vietnam	5	2	1	2	12	9	+3	7
Cambodia	5	1	0	4	2	25	−23	3
Chinese Taipei	5	0	0	5	1	23	−22	0

12 September 2011
16:00

Chinese Taipei	0–4	Japan
	Report	Ito 10'; Sasaki 50'; Kitagawa 68', 73'

New Laos National Stadium, Vientiane
Attendance: 500
Referee: Thiam Hoe Leow (Singapore)
12 September 2011
16:00

Vietnam	1–1	South Korea
Trần Ngọc Sơn 75' (pen.)	Report	Hwang Hee-Chan 27'

Laos National Stadium, Vientiane
Attendance: 450
Referee: Rustam Kholov (Tajikistan)
12 September 2011
19:00

Laos	5–0	Cambodia
Phithack 34'; Armisay 24' (pen.), 58'; Southavone 51'; Anilan 90+2'	Report

New Laos National Stadium, Vientiane
Attendance: 1,000
Referee: Suleiman Jaber Dalgham (Jordan)

14 September 2011
16:00

Japan	2–4	South Korea
Okamura 5'; Sugimoto 74'	Report	Hwang Hee-Chan 20'; Lee Gun 43', 90+4'; Yoo Won-Jong 81'

New Laos National Stadium, Vientiane
Attendance: 1,140
Referee: Chris Beath (Australia)
14 September 2011
16:00

Chinese Taipei	1–2	Cambodia
Wang Chueh-Chun 68'	Report	Phallin 8', 10' (pen.)

Laos National Stadium, Vientiane
Attendance: 300
Referee: Apisit Aonrak (Thailand)
14 September 2011
19:00

Vietnam	0–3	Laos
	Report	Dalavong 13', 23'; Kettavong 76'

New Laos National Stadium, Vientiane
Attendance: 2,180
Referee: Ghandour Radwan (Lebanon)

17 September 2011
16:00

South Korea	8–0	Chinese Taipei
Hwang Ki-Wook 8' (pen.); Suh Jeong-Deog 10', 14'; Roh Kyoung-Woo 19', 62' (pen.), 76'; Tsai Shuo-Che 42' (o.g.); Yu Chung-In 66'	Report

Laos National Stadium, Vientiane
Attendance: 300
Referee: Thiam Hoe Leow (Singapore)
17 September 2011
16:00
group

Cambodia	0–5	Vietnam
	Report	Trần Ngọc Sơn 12' (pen.); Vũ Duy Nghi 80', 88'; Nguyễn Việt Thắng 86'; Nguyễn Quang Hải 90'

New Laos National Stadium, Vientiane
Attendance: 1,900
Referee: Rustam Kholov (Tajikistan)
17 September 2011
19:00

Japan	6–0	Laos
Nakamura 16', 55'; Kitagawa 47', 74'; Yoshiki 66'; Kobayashi 86'	Report

New Laos National Stadium, Vientiane
Attendance: 7,690
Referee: Suleiman Jaber Dalgham (Jordan)

19 September 2011
16:00

Cambodia	0–4	Japan
	Report	Nakamura 58', 61', 66'; Takagi 90+1'

Laos National Stadium, Vientiane
Attendance: 230
Referee: Apisit Aonrak (Thailand)
19 September 2011
16:00

Vietnam	4–0	Chinese Taipei
Lê Hoàng Dương 9', 69'; Huỳnh Hoàng Khanh 50'; Nguyễn Duy Điển 68'	Report

New Laos National Stadium, Vientiane
Attendance: 200
Referee: Rustam Kholov (Tajikistan)
19 September 2011
19:00

Laos	0–0	South Korea
	Report

New Laos National Stadium, Vientiane
Attendance: 2,820
Referee: Chris Beath (Australia)

22 September 2011
16:00

South Korea	10–0	Cambodia
Seukirin 1' (o.g.); Lee Gun 14', 34', 74', 87'; Choi Ju-Yong 16'; Hwang Ki-Wook 21'; You Jin-Seok 70'; Ko Min-Hyeok 84'; Roh Kyoung-Woo 90'	Report

Laos National Stadium, Vientiane
Attendance: 300
Referee: Chris Beath (Australia)
22 September 2011
16:00

Japan	5–2	Vietnam
Nakamura 35', 57', 72'; Kobayashi 51'; Sakai 66'	Report	Nguyễn Việt Thắng 1'; Lê Hoàng Dương 63'

New Laos National Stadium, Vientiane
Attendance: 1,200
Referee: Suleiman Jaber Dalgham (Jordan)
22 September 2011
19:00

Chinese Taipei	0–5	Laos
	Report	Kongmathilath 6', 15'; Dalavong 11'; Yen Ting-Han 30' (o.g.); Keola 83'

New Laos National Stadium, Vientiane
Attendance: 12,000
Referee: Thiam Hoe Leow (Singapore)

=== Group G ===
All matches were held in Nonthaburi (Nonthaburi) and Bangkok, Thailand (UTC+7).

Team	Pld	W	D	L	GF	GA	GD	Pts
Thailand (H)	5	5	0	0	28	6	+22	15
Australia	5	4	0	1	22	5	+17	12
Indonesia	5	3	0	2	26	10	+16	9
Myanmar	5	2	0	3	13	14	−1	6
Hong Kong	5	1	0	4	8	14	−6	3
Guam	5	0	0	5	1	49	−48	0

12 September 2011
18:00

Thailand	3–2	Australia
Tonglim 44'; Pamornprasert 50' (pen.); Puangbut 53'	Report	Tombides 11'; O'Neill 59'

Thephasadin Stadium, Bangkok
Attendance: 1,200
Referee: Jumpei Iida (Japan)
12 September 2011
15:00

Hong Kong	4–1	Guam
Brian Liu 15', 38'; Philip Wong 52'; Orr 60'	Report	Reyes 89'

Rajamangala National Stadium, Bangkok
Attendance: 25
Referee: Mohd Nafeez Bin Abdul Wahab (Malaysia)
12 September 2011
18:00

Indonesia	4–1	Myanmar
Puhiri 8', 29', 70'; Ihza 45+2'	Report	Kyaw Min Oo 80'

Rajamangala National Stadium, Bangkok
Attendance: 200
Referee: Yasser Al Rawahi (Oman)

14 September 2011
15:00

Thailand	11–0	Guam
Kulchart 7'; Puangbut 8'; Pamornprasert 16'; Kannoo 28', 31', 47', 71', 90+1'; Tiammuang 33'; Malison 39'; Klankhum 82'	Report

Rajamangala National Stadium, Bangkok
Attendance: 600
Referee: Singh Sukhbir (Singapore)
14 September 2011
18:00

Australia	4–0	Myanmar
Warland 20'; De Silva 76', 87'; Tombides 79'	Report

Rajamangala National Stadium, Bangkok
Attendance: 400
Referee: Lee Dong-Jun (South Korea)
14 September 2011
18:00

Indonesia	2–0	Hong Kong
Gavin Kwan 3'; Puhiri 84'	Report

Yamaha Stadium, Nonthaburi
Attendance: 30
Referee: Ma Ning (China PR)

17 September 2011
15:00

Australia	1–0	Hong Kong
Warland 31'	Report

Rajamangala National Stadium, Bangkok
Attendance: 150
Referee: Yasser Al Rawahi (Oman)
17 September 2011
18:00

Myanmar	1–4	Thailand
Aung Thu 45+2'	Report	Kannoo 2' (pen.); Puangbut 15'; Pamornprasert 54' (pen.); Tiammung 90+3'

Rajamangala National Stadium, Bangkok
Attendance: 300
Referee: Mohd Nafeez Bin Abdul Wahab (Malaysia)
17 September 2011
18:00

Guam	0–17	Indonesia
	Report	Kurniawan 13', 14', 61', 75', 85'; Puhiri 20', 25', 72', 87'; Fachrozy 26'; Tedi 48', 56', 57', 80'; Hariansyah 67'; Asso 73', 89'

Yamaha Stadium, Nonthaburi
Attendance: 200
Referee: Jumpei Iida (Japan)

19 September 2011
15:00

Hong Kong	2–4	Myanmar
Ip Ching 3' (pen.); Wong Philip 64'	Report	Soe Min Tun 48'; Zin Ko Tun 80' (pen.); Nyein Chan Aung 89'; Wanna 90+3'

Rajamangala National Stadium, Bangkok
Attendance: 100
Referee: Singh Sukhbir (Singapore)
19 September 2011
18:00

Guam	0–10	Australia
	Report	Stergiou 10'; Tombides 51', 53', 65', 86', 90+2'; Ly 61'; MacDonald 67', 75', 81'

Thephasadin Stadium, Bangkok
Attendance: 100
Referee: Lee Dong-Jun (South Korea)
19 September 2011
18:00

Indonesia	1–4	Thailand
Nugroho 66' (pen.)	Report	Kannoo 57', 62'; Puangbut 85'; Maperm 88'

Rajamangala National Stadium, Bangkok
Attendance: 500
Referee: Ma Ning (China PR)

22 September 2011
15:00

Thailand	6–2	Hong Kong
Kannoo 10', 23', 51', 80'; Sukchuai 50' (pen.); Puangbut 73'	Report	Philip 77' (pen.); Liu Ho Wang 85'

Rajamangala National Stadium, Bangkok
Attendance: 200
Referee: Mohd Nafeez Bin Abdul Wahab (Malaysia)
22 September 2011
18:00

Myanmar	7–0	Guam
Wanna 4', 24', 57'; Aung Thu Phyo 25', 32', 36', 65'	Report

Thephasadin Stadium, Bangkok
Attendance: 100
Referee: Yasser Al Rawahi (Oman)
22 September 2011
18:00

Australia	5–2	Indonesia
Tombides 3', 78'; Calver 10'; Papadimitrios 39' (pen.); Tanner 63'	Report	Hargianto 9'; Kurniawan 66'

Rajamangala National Stadium, Bangkok
Attendance: 100
Referee: Jumpei Iida (Japan)

== Third-placed qualifiers ==
At the end of the first stage, a comparison was made between the third placed teams from West and East zones will qualify for the tournament. The best third-placed team from each region advanced to the 2012 AFC U-16 Championship. Due to the varying number of teams per group, teams in different group would have played different number of matches. Therefore, in order to ensure equality when comparing the runner-up teams of all the groups, all teams will be compared across similar number of matches. AFC will decide on the number of matches. In principle, the results of the matches between the runner-up team and the bottom placed team in the group will be considered null and void.

West Zone

In western Zone Saudi Arabia qualified as best third-place finisher.

Team	Pld	W	D	L	GF	GA	GD	Pts
Saudi Arabia	3	1	1	1	5	3	+2	4
United Arab Emirates	3	1	1	1	4	4	0	4
Qatar	3	1	0	2	5	6	−1	3
Bahrain	3	0	1	2	3	6	−3	1

East Zone

In the Eastern zone Laos qualified as best third-place finisher.

Team	Pld	W	D	L	GF	GA	GD	Pts
Laos	4	2	1	1	8	6	+2	7
Indonesia	4	2	0	2	9	10	−1	6
Singapore	4	1	1	2	10	6	+4	4

== Qualifiers ==
- Australia
- China
- India
- Iran (host)
- Iraq
- Japan
- Kuwait
- Laos
- North Korea
- Oman
- Saudi Arabia
- South Korea
- Syria
- Thailand
- Uzbekistan
- Yemen

== See also ==
- 2012 AFC U-19 Championship qualification
