= 2012 AFC U-16 Championship =

مسابقات فوتبال زیر ۱۶ سال آسیا ۲۰۱۲

Tournament details
- Host country: Iran
- Dates: 22 September – 6 October
- Teams: 16 (from 1 confederation)
- Venues: 2 (in 1 host city)

Final positions
- Champions: Uzbekistan (1st title)
- Runners-up: Japan

Tournament statistics
- Matches played: 31
- Goals scored: 97 (3.13 per match)
- Attendance: 12,853 (415 per match)
- Top scorer(s): (South Korea) Hwang Hee-Chan (5 goals)
- Best player: (Japan) Taro Sugimoto

The 2012 AFC U-16 Championship was the 15th edition of the tournament organized by the Asian Football Confederation. The AFC approved Iran as hosts of the championship on 23 November 2011. The top 4 teams qualified for the 2013 FIFA U-17 World Cup, hosted by the United Arab Emirates. Qualification for the tournament started in 2011.

== Host Selection ==
The Organising Committee for AFC Youth Competitions for the 2011–2015 term announced that Iran and Palestine were interested in hosting the 2012 AFC U-16 Championship Finals.

Per decision of the AFC Competitions Committee, the host nation should qualify for the final tournament. The decision on the hosts was taken in the committee's meeting on 21 November 2011 based on the results of the qualifiers.

== Qualification ==
The qualification draw was held on 30 March 2011.

=== Qualifiers ===
- Iran
- Yemen
- Laos
- Australia
- Iraq
- Japan
- Kuwait
- China
- North Korea
- Oman
- Saudi Arabia
- South Korea
- Syria
- Thailand
- Uzbekistan
- India

== Venues ==
Tehran	2012 AFC U-16 Championship is located in Iran	Tehran
Shahid Dastgerdi Stadium	2012 AFC U-16 Championship is located in Iran	Ekbatan Stadium
Capacity: 8,250	2012 AFC U-16 Championship is located in Iran	Capacity: 12,000

== Draw ==
The draw for the competition was held on 10 May 2012 in Tehran, Iran.

Pot 1 (Host & Seeds)	Pot 2	Pot 3	Pot 4
Iran; North Korea; Uzbekistan; Australia	Japan; Syria; Iraq; Kuwait	China; Oman; Saudi Arabia; Yemen	Thailand; Laos; South Korea; India

== Group stage ==
In the group stage the tie-breaking criteria are direct matches before goal difference.

=== Group A ===
Team	Pld	W	D	L	GF	GA	GD	Pts
Iran	3	3	0	0	9	3	+6	9
Kuwait	3	1	1	1	6	6	0	4
Laos	3	1	0	2	6	8	−2	3
Yemen	3	0	1	2	3	7	−4	1

22 September 2012
13:00

Kuwait	1–1	Yemen
Thekr Allah 19'	Report	Al-Dahi 71' (pen.)

Shahid Dastgerdi Stadium, Tehran
Attendance: 100
Referee: Mohamed Al Zarouni (United Arab Emirates)

22 September 2012
17:00

Iran	3–1	Laos
Mazloum 17', 48'; Hosseini 19' (pen.)	Report	Noyvong 2'

Shahid Dastgerdi Stadium, Tehran
Attendance: 450
Referee: Dmitriy Mashentsev (Kyrgyzstan)

24 September 2012
13:00

Laos	3–4	Kuwait
Phanthavong 24'; Kettavong 28'; Noyvong 37' (pen.)	Report	Marzouq 26', 90+1'; Keola 32' (o.g.); Alajmi 90+2'

Shahid Dastgerdi Stadium, Tehran
Attendance: 100
Referee: Salah Abbas Alabbasi (Bahrain)

24 September 2012
17:00

Yemen	1–4	Iran
Al-Dahi 3'	Report	Rigi 54'; Ezzatollahi 61'; Jafari 65'; Karamolachaab 81'

Shahid Dastgerdi Stadium, Tehran
Attendance: 421
Referee: Maasaki Toma (Japan)

26 September 2012
17:00

Iran	2–1	Kuwait
Hosseini 40'; Shojaei 62'	Report	Thekr Allah 27'

Shahid Dastgerdi Stadium, Tehran
Attendance: 510
Referee: Valentin Kovalenko (Uzbekistan)

26 September 2012
17:00

Yemen	1–2	Laos
Al-Dahi 45'	Report	Mahdi 12' (o.g.); Kettavong 70'

Rah Ahan Stadium, Tehran
Attendance: 50
Referee: Chaiya Mahapab (Thailand)

=== Group B ===
Iraq and Australia played a penalty shootout after their final group match to determine the group winner, in which Iraq won that 3–2.

Team	Pld	W	D	L	GF	GA	GD	Pts
Iraq	3	2	1	0	4	1	+3	7
Australia	3	2	1	0	4	1	+3	7
Oman	3	1	0	2	5	6	−1	3
Thailand	3	0	0	3	2	7	−5	0

22 September 2012
15:00

Australia	2–0	Thailand
Tombides 14'; MacDonald 29'	Report

Rah Ahan Stadium, Tehran
Attendance: 183
Referee: Valentin Kovalenko (Uzbekistan)

22 September 2012
19:00

Iraq	2–1	Oman
Abdul-Zahra 5'; Majed 35'	Report	Al-Rushadi 61'

Rah Ahan Stadium, Tehran
Attendance: 150
Referee: Abdulrahman Abdou (Qatar)

24 September 2012
15:00

Thailand	0–2	Iraq
	Report	Karim 63'; M. Lateef 65'

Rah Ahan Stadium, Tehran
Attendance: 350
Referee: Naser Al Ghafari (Jordan)

24 September 2012
19:00

Oman	1–2	Australia
Al-Rushadi 52' (pen.)	Report	MacDonald 16'; Baldacchino 87'

Rah Ahan Stadium, Tehran
Attendance: 100
Referee: Yousef Al-Marzouq (Kuwait)

26 September 2012
13:00

Australia	0–0	Iraq
	Report
Penalties
	2–3

Shahid Dastgerdi Stadium, Tehran
Attendance: 150
Referee: Kim Jong-Hyeok (South Korea)

26 September 2012
13:00

Oman	3–2	Thailand
Al-Alawi 40'; Mubarak 55'; Al-Rushadi 72'	Report	Puangbut 8'; Thongma 17'

Rah Ahan Stadium, Tehran
Attendance: 55
Referee: Salah Abbas Alabbasi (Bahrain)

=== Group C ===
Team	Pld	W	D	L	GF	GA	GD	Pts
South Korea	3	3	0	0	7	1	+6	9
Japan	3	2	0	1	6	3	+3	6
North Korea	3	1	0	2	2	7	−5	3
Saudi Arabia	3	0	0	3	1	5	−4	0

23 September 2012
13:00

North Korea	0–3	South Korea
	Report	Hwang Hee-Chan 18', 58', 67'

Shahid Dastgerdi Stadium, Tehran
Attendance: 331
Referee: Yadollah Jahanbazi (Iran)

23 September 2012
17:00

Japan	2–0	Saudi Arabia
Sasaki 44'; Sugimoto 56'	Report

Shahid Dastgerdi Stadium, Tehran
Attendance: 200
Referee: Strebre Delovski (Australia)

25 September 2012
13:00

South Korea	3–1	Japan
Hwang Hee-Chan 13'; Choi Ju-Yong 42'; Ko Min-hyuk 89'	Report	Ogawa 23'

Shahid Dastgerdi Stadium, Tehran
Attendance: 350
Referee: Mohamed Al Zarouni (United Arab Emirates)

25 September 2012
17:00

Saudi Arabia	1–2	North Korea
Al-Qahtani 54'	Report	Ri Ryong 48'; Ri Kwang-Song 82'

Shahid Dastgerdi Stadium, Tehran
Attendance: 237
Referee: Dmitriy Mashentsev (Kyrgyzstan)

27 September 2012
17:00

North Korea	0–3	Japan
	Report	Nakamura 14'; Sugimoto 49'; Ogawa 82'

Shahid Dastgerdi Stadium, Tehran
Attendance: 150
Referee: Abdulrahman Abdou (Qatar)

27 September 2012
17:00

Saudi Arabia	0–1	South Korea
	Report	Jeong Hun-U 62'

Rah Ahan Stadium, Tehran
Attendance: 62
Referee: Yousef Al-Marzouq (Kuwait)

=== Group D ===
Team	Pld	W	D	L	GF	GA	GD	Pts
Syria	3	1	2	0	2	1	+1	5
Uzbekistan	3	1	1	1	4	4	0	4
China	3	0	3	0	4	4	0	3
India	3	0	2	1	4	5	−1	2

23 September 2012
15:00

Uzbekistan	3–2	India
Odilov 8'; Abdullaev 53' (pen.); Abdiganiyev 79'	Report	Rai 47', 71'

Rah Ahan Stadium, Tehran
Attendance: 100
Referee: Chaiya Mahapab (Thailand)

23 September 2012
19:00

Syria	1–1	China
Kurdaghli 90+4'	Report	Zhang Yuning 48'

Rah Ahan Stadium, Tehran
Attendance: 100
Referee: Kim Jong-Hyeok (South Korea)

25 September 2012
15:00

India	0–0	Syria
	Report

Rah Ahan Stadium, Tehran
Attendance: 150
Referee: Strebre Delovski (Australia)

25 September 2012
19:00

China	1–1	Uzbekistan
Hu Jinghang 43'	Report	Boltaboev 16'

Rah Ahan Stadium, Tehran
Attendance: 100
Referee: Yadollah Jahanbazi (Iran)

27 September 2012
13:00

Uzbekistan	0–1	Syria
	Report	Alhusni 33'

Shahid Dastgerdi Stadium, Tehran
Attendance: 20
Referee: Maasaki Toma (Japan)

27 September 2012
13:00

China	2–2	India
Wang Jinxian 21'; Zhang Yuning 33'	Report	Lalhlimpuia 19'; Mendes 90+4' (pen.)

Rah Ahan Stadium, Tehran
Attendance: 100
Referee: Naser Al Ghafari (Jordan)

== Knockout stage ==
=== Knockout Map ===
Quarter-finals
30 September
Iran	5
Australia	1
30 September
South Korea	1(3)
Uzbekistan	1(5)
30 September
Iraq	3
Kuwait	1
30 September
Syria	1
Japan	2

Semi-finals
3 October
Iran	2
Uzbekistan	3
3 October
Iraq	1
Japan	5

Final
6 October
Uzbekistan	1(3)
Japan	1(1)

=== Quarterfinals ===
30 September 2012
13:00

Iraq	3–1	Kuwait
Kadhim 59'; Salman 74'; Majed 80'	Report	Alasfour 68'

Shahid Dastgerdi Stadium, Tehran
Attendance: 500
Referee: Valentin Kovalenko (Uzbekistan)

30 September 2012
15:00

South Korea	1–1	Uzbekistan
Hwang Hee-Chan 90+4'	Report	Turaev 64'
Penalties
Yoo Won-Jong (penalty scored); Hwang Hee-Chan (penalty missed); Lee Gun (penalty scored); Lim Eun-Su (penalty scored)	3–5	(penalty scored) Komilov; (penalty scored) Abdullaev; (penalty scored) Shukurov; (penalty scored) Mirzaev; (penalty scored) Abbasov

Rah Ahan Stadium, Tehran
Attendance: 200
Referee: Mohamed Al Zarouni (United Arab Emirates)

30 September 2012
17:00

Iran	5–1	Australia
Ezzatollahi 31' (pen.); Karamolachaab 35', 90+3'; Bazaj 61'; Rigi 81'	Report	Antoniou 88'

Shahid Dastgerdi Stadium, Tehran
Attendance: 3,850
Referee: Maasaki Toma (Japan)

30 September 2012
19:00

Syria	1–2	Japan
Kurdaghli 87'	Report	Sugimori 80'; Sugimoto 82'

Rah Ahan Stadium, Tehran
Attendance: 197
Referee: Strebre Delovski (Australia)

=== Semifinals ===
3 October 2012
17:00

Iran	2–3	Uzbekistan
Hosseini 4'; Mazloum 88'	Report	Khamdamov 13'; Abdullaev 35'; Shukurov 42'

Shahid Dastgerdi Stadium, Tehran
Attendance: 3,050
Referee: Yousef Al-Marzouq (Kuwait)

3 October 2012
19:00

Iraq	1–5	Japan
Sami 59'	Report	Onishi 9'; Kitagawa 18', 88'; Watanabe 67'; Sasaki 68'

Rah Ahan Stadium, Tehran
Attendance: 537
Referee: Mohamed Al Zarouni (United Arab Emirates)

=== Final ===
6 October 2012
19:00

Uzbekistan	1–1	Japan
Turaev 52'	Report	Mizutani 6'
Penalties
Komilov (penalty scored); Shukurov (penalty scored); Mirzaev (penalty scored)	3–1	(penalty scored) Miyoshi; (penalty missed) Sugimoto; (penalty missed) Sugimori; (penalty missed) Kitagawa

Shahid Dastgerdi Stadium, Tehran
Attendance: 213
Referee: Abdulrahman Abdou (Qatar)

== Winners ==
AFC U-16 Championship 2012 winners

Uzbekistan
First title

== Countries to participate in 2013 FIFA U-17 World Cup ==
The four semi-finalists qualified for 2013 FIFA U-17 World Cup.

- Uzbekistan
- Japan
- Iran
- Iraq

== Goalscorers ==
There were 97 goals scored in 31 matches, for an average of 3.13 goals per match.

5 goals

- (South Korea) Hwang Hee-Chan

3 goals

- (Iran) Reza Karamolachaab
- (Iran) Majid Hosseini
- (Iran) Amir Mohammad Mazloum
- (Japan) Taro Sugimoto
- (Oman) Hatem Al-Rushadi
- (Yemen) Mohammed Al-Dahi

2 goals

- (Australia) Josh Macdonald
- (China) Zhang Yuning
- (Iran) Ali Rigi
- (Iran) Saeid Ezzatollahi
- (India) Uttam Rai
- (Japan) Koya Kitagawa
- (Japan) Hiroki Ogawa
- (Japan) Wataru Sasaki
- (Kuwait) Bader Thekr Allah
- (Kuwait) Nawaf Marzouq
- (Iraq) Samer Al-Mahdawi
- (Laos) Anousay Noyvong
- (Laos) Armisay Kettavong
- (Syria) Khaled Kurdaghli
- (Uzbekistan) Akobir Turaev

1 goal

- (Australia) Bai Antoniou
- (Australia) James Baldacchino
- (Australia) Taylor Tombides
- (China) Hu Jinghang
- (China) Wang Jinxian
- (Iran) Ali Shojaei
- (Iran) Mohammad Reza Bazaj
- (Iran) Sasan Jafari
- (India) Daniel Lalhlimpuia
- (India) Myron Mendes
- (Laos) Thanin Phanthavong
- (Iraq) Ali Essam Kadhim
- (Iraq) Mahdi Abdul-Zahra
- (Iraq) Mohammed Lateef
- (Iraq) Salman Ali Salman
- (Iraq) Sherko Karim
- (Iraq) Yasir Ammar Sami
- (Japan) Fumiya Nakamura
- (Japan) Koki Sugimori
- (Japan) Takuma Mizutani
- (Japan) Yuki Onishi
- (Japan) Ryoma Watanabe
- (South Korea) Choi Ju-Yong
- (South Korea) Jeong Hun-U
- (South Korea) Ko Min-hyuk
- (Kuwait) Abdullah Alasfour
- (Kuwait) Naji Alajmi
- (Saudi Arabia) Abdull-Kareem Al-Qahtani
- (Oman) Marwan Mubarak
- (Oman) Samir Al Alawi
- (North Korea) Ri Ryong
- (North Korea) Ri Kwang-Song
- (Syria) Subie Alhusni
- (Thailand) Saran Puangbut
- (Thailand) Peeranat Thongma
- (Uzbekistan) Abdullaev Izzatilla
- (Uzbekistan) Jamshid Boltaboev
- (Uzbekistan) Ibrokhim Abdullaev
- (Uzbekistan) Ilhomjon Abdiganiyev
- (Uzbekistan) Mukhiddin Odilov
- (Uzbekistan) Otabek Shukurov
- (Uzbekistan) Dostonbek Khamdamov

1 own goal

- (Laos) Anoukone Keola (playing against Kuwait)
- (Yemen) Ala Addin Mahdi (playing against Laos)
