= Thanin =

Thanin is a masculine given name. Notable people with the name include:

- Thanin Kraivichien (1927–2025), Thai judge, politician, and law professor
- Thanin Phanthavong (born 1998), Laotian footballer
