= Terens Puhiri =

Indonesian footballer

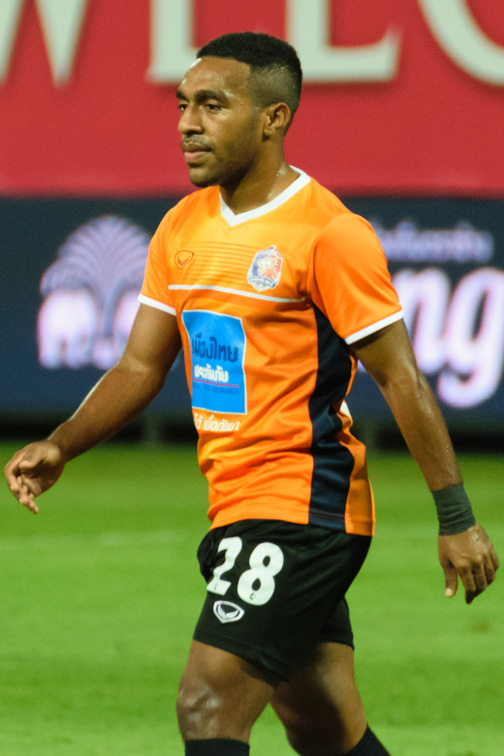
- Puhiri playing for Port in 2018

Personal information
- Full name: Terens Owang Priska Puhiri
- Date of birth: 13 October 1996 (age 30)
- Place of birth: Jayapura, Indonesia
- Height: 1.61 m (5 ft 3 in)
- Position: Winger

Team information
- Current team: Persis Solo
- Number: 28

Youth career
- 2007: Numbay Star Papua
- 2012–2014: Deportivo Indonesia
- 2014–2015: Persisam Putra Samarinda

Senior career*
Years	Team	Apps	(Gls)
2015–2025	Borneo Samarinda	210	(31)
2018	→ Port (loan)	11	(0)
2025–2026	PSS Sleman	22	(2)
2026–	Persis Solo	4	(0)

International career^{‡}
2010–2011	Indonesia U16	5	(8)
2022	Indonesia	2	(1)
- * Club domestic league appearances and goals as of 3 October 2026 ‡ National team caps and goals as of 30 January 2022

Terens Owang Priska Puhiri (born 13 October 1996) is an Indonesian professional footballer who plays as a winger for Championship club Persis Solo. He attained international stardom after footage of him sprinting in a game went viral, being hailed by several news outlets as the fastest football player in the world.

== Club career ==
=== Early career ===
Prior to becoming a professional player, Terens started his career at SSB Numbay Star Papua, and succeeded in bringing SSB Numbay Star to the Papua Regionals of the Danone Cup in 2008. As a result of this achievement, his team was selected to represent the Papua Region in the Danone Cup National stage, held in Jakarta, but were beaten in the semifinals by the team representing the Central Java region. Terens was awarded the best player award and top scorer in the event. In 2012, Terens moved to Deportivo Indonesia that plays in the lower league of the Uruguayan football league system.

=== Borneo Samarinda ===
In January 2015, Terens joined Borneo Samarinda, signing a five-year contract. On 23 October, his goal against Mitra Kukar on matchday 31 of the 2017 Liga 1 gained global attention due to the incredibly high speeds at which he appears to run in the video.

==== Loan to Port FC ====
On 20 December 2017, Terens moved to Thai League 1 club Port for a one-year loan. Terens made his club debut in a pre-season during the 2018 Leo Cup against Chiangrai United on 9 January 2018. Terens made his first Thai League 1 appearance on 11 February 2018, coming on as a substitute in a 3–0 win with Pattaya United at the PAT Stadium, Bangkok.

== International career ==
In August 2011, Terens was called up to the Indonesia U16 for 2012 AFC U-16 Championship qualification in Thailand. On 12 September 2011, he debuted in a youth national team when he coming as a starting in a 4–1 win against Myanmar U16 in the 2012 AFC U-16 Championship qualification. He also scored his first goal in 8th minute.

In January 2022, Terens was called up to the senior team in a friendly match in Bali by Shin Tae-yong. He earned his first cap in a 4–1 win friendly match against Timor Leste on 27 January 2022. He scored his debut goal, a few days later in the second match against Timor Leste again, in a 3–0 win.

In June 2022, he was called up for 2023 AFC Asian Cup qualifiers in Kuwait.

== Career statistics ==
=== Club ===
As of match played 3 October 2026

Club	Season	League			Cup (Note: Includes Piala Indonesia, Thai FA Cup)		Continental		Other (Note: Appearances in Indonesia President's Cup)		Total	
Club	Season	Division	Apps	Goals	Apps	Goals	Apps	Goals	Apps	Goals	Apps	Goals
Borneo Samarinda	2015	Indonesia Super League	2	0	0	0	—		0	0	2	0
Borneo Samarinda	2016	ISC A	31	5	0	0	—		0	0	31	5
Borneo Samarinda	2017	Liga 1	31	6	0	0	—		5	0	36	6
Borneo Samarinda	2019	Liga 1	32	8	5	1	—		2	0	39	9
Borneo Samarinda	2020	Liga 1	2	0	0	0	—		0	0	2	0
Borneo Samarinda	2021–22	Liga 1	31	4	0	0	—		3 (Note: Appearances in Menpora Cup)	0	34	4
Borneo Samarinda	2022–23	Liga 1	23	3	0	0	—		8	0	31	3
Borneo Samarinda	2023–24	Liga 1	38	3	0	0	—		0	0	38	3
Borneo Samarinda	2024–25	Liga 1	20	2	0	0	3 (Note: Appearances in ASEAN Club Championship)	0	4	0	27	2
Borneo Samarinda	Total		210	31	5	1	3	0	18	0	240	32
Port (loan)	2018	Thai League 1	11	0	2	0	—		0	0	13	0
PSS Sleman	2025–26	Championship	22	2	0	0	—		0	0	22	2
Persis Solo	2026–27	Championship	4	0	0	0	—		0	0	4	0
Career total			247	33	7	1	3	0	18	0	275	34

=== International ===
As of match played 30 January 2022

Indonesia national team
Year	Apps	Goals
2022	2	1
Total	2	1

=== International goals ===
No.	Date	Venue	Opponent	Score	Result	Competition
1.	30 January 2022	Kapten I Wayan Dipta Stadium, Gianyar, Indonesia	Timor-Leste	1–0	3–0	Friendly

== Honours ==
Borneo Samarinda

- Piala Presiden runner-up: 2017, 2022, 2024

PSS Sleman

- Championship runner up: 2025–26

Individual

- Liga 1 Team of the Season: 2019 (substitutes)
