= Takuma Mizutani =

Japanese footballer

Takuma Mizutani 水谷 拓磨
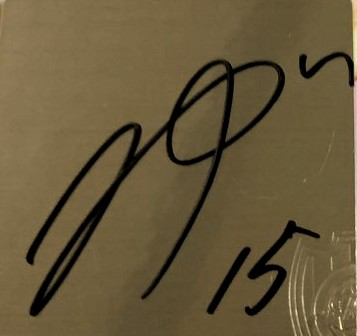

Personal information
- Full name: Takuma Mizutani
- Date of birth: April 24, 1996 (age 30)
- Place of birth: Suruga-ku, Shizuoka, Japan
- Height: 1.62 m (5 ft 4 in)
- Position: Midfielder

Team information
- Current team: Blaublitz Akita
- Number: 7

Youth career
- –2014: Shimizu S-Pulse

Senior career*
Years	Team	Apps	(Gls)
2014–2019	Shimizu S-Pulse	15	(0)
2015	→ J.League U-22 (loan)	3	
2016–2017	→ FC Imabari (loan)	20	(1)
2020–2022	Nagano Parceiro	91	(6)
2023–	Blaublitz Akita	90	(1)

International career
2013	Japan U-17	3	(0)
Medal record
Representing Japan
AFC U-16 Championship
Silver medal – second place	2012 Iran
- * Club domestic league appearances and goals as of 14 August 2026

Takuma Mizutani (水谷 拓磨, Mizutani Takuma; born April 24, 1996 in Shizuoka) is a Japanese footballer who plays as a midfielder for J2 League club Blaublitz Akita.

== Club career ==
Takuma Mizutani joined Shimizu S-Pulse in 2014. In June 2016, he moved on loan to FC Imabari.

== National team career ==
In October 2013, Mizutani was selected for the Japan U-17 national team for 2013 U-17 World Cup. He played 3 matches.

== Career statistics ==
Updated to 12 December 2022.

Appearances and goals by club, season and competition
Club	Season	League			Emperor's Cup		J.League Cup		Total	
Club	Season	Division	Apps	Goals	Apps	Goals	Apps	Goals	Apps	Goals
Shimizu S-Pulse	2014	J1 League	6	0	3	0	0	0	9	0
Shimizu S-Pulse	2015	J1 League	5	0	1	0	4	0	10	0
Shimizu S-Pulse	2016	J2 League	0	0	0	0	—		0	0
Shimizu S-Pulse	2018	J1 League	3	0	0	0	0	0	3	0
Shimizu S-Pulse	2019	J1 League	1	0	2	0	6	0	9	0
Shimizu S-Pulse	Total		15	0	6	0	10	0	31	0
FC Imabari (loan)	2016	JRL (Shikoku)	4	0	1	0	—		5	0
FC Imabari (loan)	2017	JFL	16	1	1	0	—		17	1
FC Imabari (loan)	Total		20	1	2	0	0	0	22	1
Nagano Parceiro	2020	J3 League	32	1	—		—		32	1
Nagano Parceiro	2021	J3 League	28	3	2	1	—		30	4
Nagano Parceiro	2022	J3 League	31	2	0	0	—		31	2
Nagano Parceiro	Total		91	6	2	1	0	0	93	7
Blaublitz Akita	2023	J2 League	0	0	0	0	—		0	0
Career total			126	7	10	1	10	0	146	8
