= Ko Min-hyuk =

South Korean footballer

Personal information
- Full name: Ko Min-hyuk
- Date of birth: 10 February 1996 (age 30)
- Place of birth: South Korea
- Height: 1.71 m (5 ft 7 in)
- Position: Midfielder

Youth career
- –2015: Ulsan Hyundai

Senior career*
Years	Team	Apps	(Gls)
2015–2016	Ulsan Hyundai	0	(0)
2015–2016	→ Daejeon Citizen (loan)	12	(1)
2017	Seoul E-Land	4	(0)
2018–2019	Abahani	10	(1)
2020–	Namdong	16	(2)

International career
2011–2012	South Korea U17	7	(2)
- * Club domestic league appearances and goals as of 30 March 2019

- Ko Min-hyuk
- Hangul: 고민혁
- Hanja: 高敏赫
- RR: Go Minhyeok
- MR: Ko Minhyŏk

Ko Min-hyuk (Korean: 고민혁; born 10 February 1996) is a South Korean footballer who last played as a midfielder for Abahani.

== Club career ==
Ko joined Ulsan Hyundai in 2015 and in July 2015, he was loaned to Daejeon Citizen.

On 5 July 2015 Ko made his league debut against Jeonbuk Hyundai. During his time at Daejeon Citizen, Ko appeared in 12 league matches and scored one goal before returning to Ulsan. He later played for Seoul E-Land FC and joined Abahani Limited Dhaka in 2018, where he participated in the Bangladesh Premier League.

== International career ==
He was a member of the South Korea national U-17 team for the 2012 AFC U-16 Championship.

== Club career statistics ==
Club performance			League		Cup		continental		Total	
Season	Club	League	Apps	Goals	Apps	Goals	Apps	Goals	Apps	Goals
South Korea			League		KFA Cup		Asia		Total	
2015	Daejeon Citizen	K League	11	1	0	0	—		11	1
2016	Daejeon Citizen	K League	1	0	0	0	—		1	0
Total	South Korea		12	1	0	0	0	0	12	1
Career total			12	1	0	0	0	0	12	1
