= Amir Mohammad Mazloum =

Iranian footballer

Amin Mazloum
Personal information
- Full name: Amir Mohammad Mazloum
- Date of birth: 27 January 1996 (age 30)
- Place of birth: Rasht, Iran
- Height: 1.83 m (6 ft 0 in)
- Position: Forward

Team information
- Current team: Etehad Fuman
- Number: 99

Youth career
- 2006–2008: Pegah Gilan
- 2008–2009: Damash Gilan
- 2009–2010: Malavan
- 2010–2012: Damash Tehran
- 2012–2013: Damash Gilan

Senior career*
| Years | Team | Apps | (Gls) |
| 2013–2014 | Damash Gilan | 6 | (0) |
| 2014–2015 | Moghavemat Tehran | 0 | (0) |
| 2015–2016 | Malavan | 0 | (0) |
| 2016–2018 | Moghavemat Tehran | | |
| 2019–2020 | Zolfaghar Kashan | | |
| 2021–2022 | Malavan B | | |
| 2022–2023 | Vahdat Rudbar | | |
| 2023– | Etehad Fuman | | |

International career
| 2011–2013 | Iran U17 | 30 | (14) |
| 2014 | Iran U20 | 1 | (1) |
- * Club domestic league appearances and goals as of 11 April 2014

Amir Mohammad Mazloum (Persian: امیرمحمد مظلوم; born 27 January 1996) is an Iranian footballer who plays for Etehad Fuman. He formerly played for the Iran national under-17 football team and the Iran national under-20 football team.

== International career ==
=== U17 ===
He represented Iran U17 in 2012 AFC U-16 Championship and 2013 FIFA U-17 World Cup.

=== U20 ===
He invited to Iran U20 by Ali Dousti Mehr to preparation for 2014 AFC U-19 Championship.
