= Uttam Rai =

Indian footballer

Personal information
- Date of birth: 20 December 1996 (age 29)
- Place of birth: Chumbung, West Sikkim, India
- Position: Forward

Team information
- Current team: Sankata Boys

Youth career
- 2007: Namchi Football Academy
- 2008–2009: Air Force School
- 2010–2012: IMG Soccer Academy
- 2013–2014: Colorado Rush

Senior career*
Years	Team	Apps	(Gls)
2014–2016	Dempo	10	(2)
2016	Chennaiyin	1	(0)
2016–2017	→ Minerva Punjab (loan)	4	(0)
2017–2019	Churchill Brothers	17	(0)
2019–2020	Friends Club	9	(4)
2020–2021	Garhwal	5	(0)
2021	Southern Samity	?	
2021–	Sankata Boys	12	(5)

International career
2010	India U14		
2011–2012	India U16	7	(8)
2013–2015	India U19	3	(0)
- * Club domestic league appearances and goals as of 27 December 2021

Uttam Rai (born 20 December 1996) is an Indian professional footballer who plays as a forward. He previously appeared with both the Nepali Martyr's Memorial A-Division League clubs Friends Kopundole and Sankata Boys.

== Early career ==
Rai was born on 20 December 1996 in Chumbung, West Sikkim, India. In 2007 Uttam joined the Namchi Football Academy, under the Search for More Bhaichungs program, in which he played in the Subroto Cup for two years. His highlight of the tournament was when he scored four goals in only 35 minutes against Sri Vyas Vidya Mandir, a game Namchi won 13–0.

After the 2007 Subroto Cup, Uttam gained a scholarship for Air Force School Football Academy who are based in Delhi where he stayed for two years. While with Air Force Uttam played in the Subroto Cup and in the DSA School Level League. Uttam played in the Subroto Cup for three seasons scoring 32 goals. He was then selected for the Subroto XI team which would tour Europe. While on tour Uttam received an offer from Swiss club Grasshopper Club Zürich who play in the Swiss Super League after Rai played two games against them for Subroto XI and scored three goals. However, due to being unable to gain a work permit Uttam came back to India. After coming back to India, Uttam was selected for the India team to play in the Tata Tea Jago Re tournament and travelled with an U16 squad to play some matches and train in Arsenal Academy. While at the tournament Uttam played against Canada, South Africa and England in first few rounds. India were knocked out after losing 7–5, after a semi-final against Spain.

In 2010, Uttam gained a selection to join the IMG Soccer Academy in Bradenton, Florida, United States with 14 other players from the India U16s. In 2011, Uttam played in the Dallas Cup for the India U16s, but it ended early for him as he got injured. One year later after scoring six goals in only four games during the 2012 AFC U-16 Championship qualification Uttam was named as one of the Top 10 Players To Watch Out For during the 2012 Dallas Cup. However he did not score in any of the three matches for India during the Dallas Cup as India went 0–1–2. In 2013–14, Rai appeared with USL League Two side Colorado Rush.

== Club career ==
=== Dempo ===
Rai made his professional début on 23 May 2015 as 73rd-minute substitute for Alwyn George in a match against Bengaluru FC. Just four minutes later he scored the equalizing goal in an eventual 1–1 draw after receiving a pass from fellow substitute Mandar Rao Desai.

=== Sankata Boys ===
On 12 November 2021, Rai moved to Nepal again and signed with Sankata Boys S.C. for the 2021 Martyr's Memorial A-Division League season. He debuted on 20 November against Himalayan Sherpa Club, the match ended 1–1. He scored a brace on 27 December in their 3–0 victory against Brigade Boys Club. He scored a total of 5 goals in 12 league matches for the club.

== International career ==
Uttam made his country debut at the under-14 level for India in 2010 during the AFC U14 Football Festival. He then made his debut for the India U16 side on 1 October 2011 in the first match of the 2012 AFC U-16 Championship qualification against Kyrgyzstan and marked it off as he scored 5 goals during that match. Rai then scored again for the India U16s against Tajikistan on 7 October 2011 as India qualified for the 2012 AFC U-16 Championship.

Uttam was in the Indian U19 squad for the 2014 AFC U-19 Championship qualification in 2013 where he made 3 appearances.

== Personal life ==
Rai was born in Namchi, Sikkim very close to the birthplace of his footballing idol Baichung Bhutia. He is also a fan of Spanish striker Fernando Torres and Barcelona.

== Career statistics ==
As of 29 May 2016

Club	Season	League			Federation Cup		Durand Cup		AFC		Total	
Club	Season	Division	Apps	Goals	Apps	Goals	Apps	Goals	Apps	Goals	Apps	Goals
Dempo	2014–15	I-League	2	1	0	0	0	0	—	—	2	1
Dempo	2015–16	I-League 2nd Division	8	1	—	—	—	—	—	—	8	1
Career total			10	2	0	0	0	0	0	0	10	2

== Honours ==
Dempo

- I-League 2nd Division: 2015–16

India U16

- SAFF U-16 Championship runner-up: 2011

== See also ==
- List of Indian football players in foreign leagues
