= Wataru Sasaki =

Japanese footballer

Personal information
- Full name: Wataru Sasaki
- Date of birth: July 28, 1996 (age 30)
- Place of birth: Mitaka, Tokyo, Japan
- Height: 1.74 m (5 ft 8 1/2 in)
- Position: Midfielder

Team information
- Current team: FC Maruyasu Okazaki
- Number: 14

Youth career
- 2009–2014: FC Tokyo U-15/18

Senior career*
| Years | Team | Apps | (Gls) |
| 2014–2015 | FC Tokyo | 1 | (0) |
| 2016 | → FC Tokyo U-23 (loan) | 17 | (0) |
| 2017-18 | Kamatamare Sanuki | 79 | (3) |
| 2022- | FC Maruyasu Okazaki | 2 | (0) |
| Total | | 99 | (3) |
Medal record
Representing Japan
AFC U-16 Championship
| Silver medal – second place | 2012 Iran |
- * Club domestic league appearances and goals as of 24 January 2024 @ 11:27(AEST)

Wataru Sasaki (佐々木 渉, Sasaki Wataru; born July 28, 1996, in Mitaka, Tokyo) is a Japanese football player for Kamatamare Sanuki.

== Club statistics ==
Updated to 23 February 2017.

| Club performance | | | League | | Cup | | League Cup | | Continental | | Total | |
| Season | Club | League | Apps | Goals | Apps | Goals | Apps | Goals | Apps | Goals | Apps | Goals |
| Japan | | | League | | Emperor's Cup | | J.League Cup | | AFC | | Total | |
|---|---|---|---|---|---|---|---|---|---|---|---|---|
| 2014 | FC Tokyo | J1 League | 1 | 0 | – | | – | | – | | 1 | 0 |
| 2015 | FC Tokyo | J1 League | 0 | 0 | 0 | 0 | 0 | 0 | – | | 0 | 0 |
| 2016 | FC Tokyo | J1 League | 0 | 0 | 0 | 0 | 0 | 0 | 0 | 0 | 0 | 0 |
| 2016 | FC Tokyo U-23 | J3 League | 17 | 0 | – | | – | | – | | 17 | 0 |
| Career total | | | 18 | 0 | 0 | 0 | 0 | 0 | – | | 18 | 0 |
