= Taro Sugimoto =

Japanese footballer (born 1996)

Taro Sugimoto 杉本太郎
Personal information
- Full name: Taro Sugimoto
- Date of birth: 28 December 1996 (age 29)
- Place of birth: Tajimi, Japan
- Height: 1.62 m (5 ft 4 in)
- Position: Midfielder

Team information
- Current team: Tokushima Vortis
- Number: 10

Youth career
- 2011–2013: Teikyo University Kani High School

Senior career*
Years	Team	Apps	(Gls)
2014–2018	Kashima Antlers	19	(1)
2014	→ J. League U-22 (loan)	6	(0)
2017–2018	→ Tokushima Vortis (loan)	65	(7)
2019–2020	Matsumoto Yamaga FC	63	(7)
2021–2022	Avispa Fukuoka	29	(0)
2022–	Tokushima Vortis	127	(9)

International career
2013	Japan U17	4	(1)
2014	Japan U18	3	(2)
Medal record
Kashima Antlers
Winner	J1 League	2016
Winner	J.League Cup	2015
Winner	Emperor's Cup	2016
Representing Japan
AFC U-16 Championship
Silver medal – second place	2012 Iran
- * Club domestic league appearances and goals as of 14 August 2026

Taro Sugimoto (杉本 太郎, Sugimoto Tarō; born 12 February 1996 in Tajimi) is a Japanese footballer who plays as a midfielder for J2 League club Tokushima Vortis.

== National team career ==
In October 2013, Sugimoto was elected Japan U-17 national team for 2013 U-17 World Cup. He played all 4 matches and scored a goal against Venezuela. Japan made it to the round of 16.

== Club statistics ==
As of 17 April 2023.

Appearances and goals by club, season and competition
Club	Season	League			Cup		League Cup		Other		Total	
Club	Season	Division	Apps	Goals	Apps	Goals	Apps	Goals	Apps	Goals	Apps	Goals
Japan			League		Emperor's Cup		League Cup		Other		Total	
Kashima Antlers	2014	J1 League	4	0	0	0	0	0	-		4	0
Kashima Antlers	2015	J1 League	1	0	2	1	0	0	-		3	1
Kashima Antlers	2016	J1 League	14	1	3	0	2	1	2 (Note: Appearance in FIFA Club World Cup) (Note: Appearance in J.League Cup / Copa Sudamericana Championship)	0	21	2
Kashima Antlers	Total		19	1	5	1	2	1	2	0	28	3
J.League U-22 Selection (loan)	2014	J3 League	6	0	-		-		-		6	0
Tokushima Vortis (loan)	2017	J1 League	41	6	0	0	-		-		41	6
Tokushima Vortis (loan)	2018	J1 League	24	1	1	1	-		-		25	2
Tokushima Vortis (loan)	Total		65	7	1	1	0	0	0	0	66	8
Matsumoto Yamaga	2019	J1 League	27	2	0	0	5	1	-		32	3
Matsumoto Yamaga	2020	J2 League	36	5	0	0	1	0	-		37	5
Matsumoto Yamaga	Total		63	7	0	0	6	1	0	0	69	8
Avispa Fukuoka	2021	J1 League	25	0	2	1	0	0	-		27	1
Avispa Fukuoka	2022	J1 League	4	0	2	0	4	0	-		10	0
Avispa Fukuoka	Total		29	0	4	1	4	0	0	0	37	1
Tokushima Vortis	2022	J2 League	13	0	0	0	-		-		13	0
Tokushima Vortis	2023	J2 League	9	0	0	0	-		-		9	0
Tokushima Vortis	Total		22	0	0	0	0	0	0	0	22	0
Career Total			204	15	10	3	12	2	2	0	228	20

== FIFA U-17 World Cup statistics ==
Club performance			Tournament	
Season	Club	League	Apps	Goals
Tournament
2013	Japan	2013 FIFA U-17 World Cup	4	1
Total			4	1
