= Sugimori =

Sugimori (杉森) is a Japanese surname. Notable people with the surname include:

- Chikamatsu Monzaemon (real name: Nobumori Sugimori) (1653–1725), Japanese dramatist of jōruri, the form of puppet theater that later came to be known as bunraku, and the live-actor drama, kabuki
- Fabiana Sugimori
- Hisahide Sugimori (1912–1997), Japanese writer
- Ken Sugimori
- Kojiro Sugimori (1881–1968), Japanese ethicist, philosopher, political scientist, and sociologist
- Koki Sugimori
- Miho Sugimori
- Miyuki Sugimori
- Teruhiro Sugimori
- Tsutomu Sugimori (born 1955), Japanese businessman
