= Thanin Phanthavong =

Laotian football player (born 1998)

Personal information
- Date of birth: 20 May 1998 (age 28)
- Place of birth: Chanthabuly, Vientiane, Laos
- Height: 1.76 m (5 ft 9 1/2 in)
- Position: Midfielder

Youth career
- 2012–2016: Bangkok Glass

Senior career*
Years	Team	Apps	(Gls)
2017	Lao Toyota	7	(0)

International career^{‡}
2011–2012	Laos U16		(1)
2016	Laos U19		(1)
2017	Laos U23	4	(1)
2016	Laos	4	(0)
- * Club domestic league appearances and goals as of 16:31, 22 May 2017 (UTC) ‡ National team caps and goals as of 16:31, 17 October 2018 (UTC)

Thanin Phanthavong (born 20 May 1998) is a Laotian football player who currently plays as a midfielder for Lao Toyota in the Lao Premier League.

== Club career ==
Phanthavong joined Thai side Bangkok Glass in 2012, and has been loaned to affiliate club, Rangsit FC.

== International career ==
Phanthavong made his senior international debut at the 2016 AFF Championship, replacing Sitthideth Khanthavong in the 42nd minute of a 4–3 win over Brunei.

== Career statistics ==
=== International ===
As of matches played 17 October 2018.

National team	Year	Apps	Goals
Laos	2016	1	0
Laos	2017	3	0
Total		4	0
