= 2026 ASEAN U-17 Boys' Championship =

Junior football championship in 2026

Kejuaraan Remaja U-16 ASEAN 2026

Tournament details
- Host country: Indonesia
- City: Greater Surabaya
- Dates: 11–24 April
- Teams: 12 (from 1 sub-confederation)
- Venues: 2 (in 1 host city)

Final positions
- Champions: Vietnam (4th title)
- Runners-up: Malaysia
- Third place: Australia
- Fourth place: Laos

Tournament statistics
- Matches played: 22
- Goals scored: 81 (3.68 per match)
- Top scorer(s): (Australia) Georgio Hassarati (11 goals)
- Best player: (Vietnam) Chu Ngọc Nguyễn Lực
- Best goalkeeper: (Vietnam) Lý Xuân Hòa

The 2026 ASEAN U-17 Boys' Championship was the 21st edition of the ASEAN U-17 Boys' Championship, organised by ASEAN Football Federation. It was hosted by Indonesia from 11 to 24 April 2026. Players born on or after 1 January 2009 were eligible to compete in the tournament.

The competition officially applied video assistant referee (VAR) technology for the first time, first applying in the semi-final matches.

Australia were the defending champions, but were defeated by eventual champions Vietnam 2–1 in the semi-finals.

== Participant teams ==
There was no qualification, and all entrants advanced to the final tournament. The following 12 teams from member associations of the ASEAN Football Federation entered the tournament.

Team	Association	App	Previous best performance
Australia	Football Australia	10th	Winners (2008, 2016, 2024)
Brunei	FA Brunei DS	11th	Group stage (11 times)
Cambodia	FF Cambodia	13th	Fourth place (2016)
Indonesia (H)	FA Indonesia	13th	Winners (2018, 2022)
Laos	Lao FF	15th	Runners-up (2002, 2007, 2011)
Malaysia	FA Malaysia	14th	Winners (2013, 2019)
Myanmar	Myanmar FF	14th	Winners (2002, 2005)
Philippines	Philippine FF	11th	Group stage (11 times)
Singapore	FA Singapore	13th	Fourth place (2008, 2011)
Thailand	FA Thailand	13th	Winners (2007, 2011, 2015)
Timor-Leste	FF Timor-Leste	10th	Third place (2010)
Vietnam	Vietnam FF	15th	Winners (2006, 2010, 2017)

== Draw ==
The tournament's official draw was held on 6 March 2026 in Jakarta, Indonesia at 14:00 (GMT+07:00). The pot placements followed each teams progress based on the previous edition.

Pot 1	Pot 2	Pot 3	Pot 4
Indonesia (H); Australia; Thailand	Vietnam; Laos; Cambodia	Malaysia; Myanmar; Singapore	Timor-Leste; Philippines; Brunei

- (H): Tournament host

== Venues ==
The tournament will be held in the following venues in Greater Surabaya, East Java.

Gresik	Sidoarjo
Gelora Joko Samudro Stadium	Gelora Delta Stadium
Capacity: 25,000	Capacity: 19,400
2026 ASEAN U-17 Boys' Championship is located in Java

== Squads ==
Players born on or after 1 January 2009 are eligible to compete in the tournament. Each team can register a maximum of 23 players (minimum three of whom must be goalkeepers).

== Group stage ==
The group winners and best runners-up advanced to the semi-finals.

- All times listed are WIB (UTC+7).

Tiebreakers

Teams were ranked according to points (3 points for a win, 1 point for a draw, 0 points for a loss), and if tied on points, the following tie-breaking criteria were applied, in the order given, to determine the rankings:

1. Points in head-to-head matches among tied teams;
2. Goal difference in head-to-head matches among tied teams;
3. Goals scored in head-to-head matches among tied teams;
4. If more than two teams were tied, and after applying all head-to-head criteria above, a subset of teams were still tied, all head-to-head criteria above were reapplied exclusively to this subset of teams;
5. Goal difference in all group matches;
6. Goals scored in all group matches;
7. Penalty shoot-out if only two teams were tied and they met in the last round of the group;
8. Disciplinary points (yellow card = 1 point, red card as a result of two yellow cards = 3 points, direct red card = 3 points, yellow card followed by direct red card = 4 points);
9. Drawing of lots.

=== Group A ===
Pos	Team	Pld	W	D	L	GF	GA	GD	Pts	Qualification
1	Vietnam	3	2	1	0	14	0	+14	7	Knockout stage
2	Malaysia	3	2	0	1	3	4	−1	6	Knockout stage
3	Indonesia (H)	3	1	1	1	4	1	+3	4	
4	Timor-Leste	3	0	0	3	0	16	−16	0	

Source: AFF
Rules for classification: Group stage tiebreakers
(H) Hosts
13 April 2026
15:30

Vietnam	4–0	Malaysia
Lê Sỹ Bách 11', 27'; Nguyễn Văn Dương 38'; Nguyễn Mạnh Cường 56'	Report

Gelora Joko Samudro Stadium, Gresik
Referee: Choi Cheol-jun (South Korea)
13 April 2026
19:30

Indonesia	4–0	Timor-Leste
Putu 6', 17'; Ridho 36'; Dava 41'	Report

Gelora Joko Samudro Stadium, Gresik
Referee: Meder Taichiev (Kyrgyzstan)

16 April 2026
15:30

Timor-Leste	0–10	Vietnam
	Report	Chu Ngọc Nguyễn Lực 6', 32', 85'; Lê Trọng Đại Nhân 20'; Trần Ngọc Sơn 24'; Trần Trí Dũng 61'; Nguyễn Văn Dương 67', 72', 81'; Trương Nguyễn Duy Khang 70'

Gelora Joko Samudro Stadium, Gresik
Referee: Iv Tina (Cambodia)
16 April 2026
19:30

Malaysia	1–0	Indonesia
Fareez 33'	Report

Gelora Joko Samudro Stadium, Gresik
Referee: Yusuke Ohashi (Japan)

19 April 2026
19:30

Indonesia	0–0	Vietnam
	Report

Gelora Delta Stadium, Sidoarjo
Referee: Choi Cheol-jun (South Korea)
19 April 2026
19:30

Malaysia	2–0	Timor-Leste
Aniq 9'; Adam 51'	Report

Gelora Joko Samudro Stadium, Gresik
Referee: Resul Mämmedow (Turkmenistan)

=== Group B ===
Pos	Team	Pld	W	D	L	GF	GA	GD	Pts	Qualification
1	Laos	3	2	1	0	7	5	+2	7	Knockout stage
2	Myanmar	3	1	1	1	2	2	0	4	
3	Thailand	3	1	0	2	7	5	+2	3 (Note: Head-to-head points: Thailand 3, Philippines 0)	
4	Philippines	3	1	0	2	6	10	−4	3	

Source: AFF
Rules for classification: Group stage tiebreakers
Notes:
12 April 2026
15:30

Thailand	5–1	Philippines
Worawit 9'; Pattarawee 28'; Thodsadon 39'; Sathaporn 62'; Bacara 65' (o.g.)	Report	Long 79'

Gelora Joko Samudro Stadium, Gresik
Referee: Yusuke Ohashi (Japan)
12 April 2026
19:30

Laos	0–0	Myanmar
	Report

Gelora Joko Samudro Stadium, Gresik
Referee: Naufal Adya Fairuski (Indonesia)

15 April 2026
15:30

Philippines	3–4	Laos
Moleje 17'; Long 40'; Villanueva 82' (pen.)	Report	Phoutphatai 1'; Anousith 47', 56'; Anousa 89'

Gelora Joko Samudro Stadium, Gresik
Referee: Clarence Leow Hong Wei (Singapore)
15 April 2026
19:30

Myanmar	1–0	Thailand
Aung Thiha 53'	Report

Gelora Joko Samudro Stadium, Gresik
Referee: Resul Mämmedow (Turkmenistan)

18 April 2026
15:30

Thailand	2–3	Laos
Viphusit 14'; Kouakou 62'	Report	Anoulak 54'; Sisombat 72', 76'

Gelora Delta Stadium, Sidoarjo
Referee: Meder Taichiev (Kyrgyzstan)
18 April 2026
15:30

Myanmar	1–2	Philippines
Nyi Nyi Thant 20'	Report	Long 80', 85'

Gelora Joko Samudro Stadium, Gresik
Referee: Naufal Adya Fairuski (Indonesia)

=== Group C ===
Pos	Team	Pld	W	D	L	GF	GA	GD	Pts	Qualification
1	Australia	3	3	0	0	15	0	+15	9	Knockout stage
2	Singapore	3	1	1	1	5	1	+4	4	
3	Cambodia	3	1	1	1	1	2	−1	4	
4	Brunei	3	0	0	3	0	18	−18	0	

Source: AFF
Rules for classification: Group stage tiebreakers
11 April 2026
15:30

Australia	12–0	Brunei
Hassarati 3', 35', 56', 58', 81'; O'Carroll 31'; Da Cruz 34', 74'; Sayon 45+1', 49'; Katrib 52'; Zharif 70' (o.g.)	Report

Gelora Delta Stadium, Sidoarjo
Referee: Alongkorn Khonwai (Thailand)
11 April 2026
19:30

Cambodia	0–0	Singapore
	Report

Gelora Delta Stadium, Sidoarjo
Referee: Muhammad Izzul Fikri Kamaruzaman (Malaysia)

14 April 2026
15:30

Brunei	0–1	Cambodia
	Report	Kryya Ly 26'

Gelora Delta Stadium, Sidoarjo
Referee: Thura Zaw (Myanmar)
14 April 2026
19:30

Singapore	0–1	Australia
	Report	Becvinovski 90+5'

Gelora Delta Stadium, Sidoarjo
Referee: Đỗ Khánh Nam (Vietnam)

17 April 2026
15:30

Australia	2–0	Cambodia
Hassarati 8'; Sikora 80'	Report

Gelora Delta Stadium, Sidoarjo
Referee: Muhammad Izzul Fikri Kamaruzaman (Malaysia)
17 April 2026
15:30

Singapore	5–0	Brunei
Danish 30'; Aidan I. 39'; Gavriel 54'; Aryan 55'; Ayden H. 80'	Report

Gelora Joko Samudro Stadium, Gresik
Referee: John Mike Basinang (Philippines)

=== Ranking for second-placed teams ===
Pos	Grp	Team	Pld	W	D	L	GF	GA	GD	Pts	Qualification
1	A	Malaysia	3	2	0	1	3	4	−1	6	Knockout stage
2	C	Singapore	3	1	1	1	5	1	+4	4	
3	B	Myanmar	3	1	1	1	2	2	0	4	

Source: AFF
Rules for classification: Group stage tiebreakers

== Knockout stage ==
In the knockout stage, the penalty shoot-out is used to decide the winner if necessary.

=== Bracket ===
Semi-finals
22 April
Laos	0
Malaysia	3
22 April
Vietnam	2
Australia	1

Final
24 April
Malaysia	0
Vietnam	3
Third place match
24 April
Laos	0
Australia	8

=== Semi-finals ===
22 April 2026
15:30

Laos	0–3	Malaysia
	Report	Yusuf 7' (pen.); Aniq 11'; Nilandone 58' (o.g.)

Gelora Delta Stadium, Sidoarjo
Referee: Choi Cheol-jun (South Korea)

22 April 2026
19:30

Vietnam	2–1	Australia
Nguyễn Mạnh Cường 45+4'; Chu Ngọc Nguyễn Lực 61'	Report	Becvinovski 9'

Gelora Delta Stadium, Sidoarjo
Referee: Yusuke Ohashi (Japan)

=== Third place match ===
24 April 2026
15:30

Laos	0–8	Australia
	Report	Sikora 20'; Hassarati 29' (pen.), 31', 40', 51', 90+5'; A. Reid 44', 58'

Gelora Delta Stadium, Sidoarjo
Referee: Alongkorn Khonwai (Thailand)

=== Final ===
24 April 2026
19:30

Malaysia	0–3	Vietnam
	Report	Đào Quý Vương 11'; Nguyễn Văn Dương 45+4', 54'

Gelora Delta Stadium, Sidoarjo
Referee: Naufal Adya Fairuski (Indonesia)

== Winner ==
2026 ASEAN U-17 Boys Championship winners

Vietnam
Fourth title

== Awards ==
Most Valuable Player	Top Scorer Award	Best Goalkeeper Award
(Vietnam) Chu Ngọc Nguyễn Lực	(Australia) Georgio Hassarati	(Vietnam) Lý Xuân Hòa

== Final ranking ==
Pos	Team	Pld	W	D	L	GF	GA	GD	Pts	Final result
1	Vietnam	5	4	1	0	19	1	+18	13	Champion
2	Malaysia	5	3	0	2	6	7	−1	9	Runner up
3	Australia	5	4	0	1	24	2	+22	12	Third place
4	Laos	5	2	1	2	7	16	−9	7	Fourth place
5	Singapore	3	1	1	1	5	1	+4	4	Eliminated in group stage
6	Indonesia (H)	3	1	1	1	4	1	+3	4	Eliminated in group stage
7	Myanmar	3	1	1	1	2	2	0	4	Eliminated in group stage
8	Cambodia	3	1	1	1	1	2	−1	4	Eliminated in group stage
9	Thailand	3	1	0	2	7	5	+2	3 (Note: Head-to-head points: Thailand 3, Philippines 0)	Eliminated in group stage
10	Philippines	3	1	0	2	6	10	−4	3	Eliminated in group stage
11	Timor-Leste	3	0	0	3	0	16	−16	0	Eliminated in group stage
12	Brunei	3	0	0	3	0	18	−18	0	Eliminated in group stage

Source: Group stage, Knockout stage
(H) Hosts

== Goalscorers ==
There were 81 goals scored in 22 matches, for an average of 3.68 goals per match.

11 goals

- (Australia) Georgio Hassarati

6 goals

- (Vietnam) Nguyễn Văn Dương

4 goals

- (Philippines) Aarran Long
- (Vietnam) Chu Ngọc Nguyễn Lực

2 goals

- (Australia) Luke Becvinovski
- (Australia) Corey Da Cruz
- (Australia) Aston Reid
- (Australia) Achnaff Sayon
- (Australia) Josef Sikora
- (Indonesia) Putu Ekayana
- (Laos) Anousith Phadit
- (Laos) Sisombat Vilaysone
- (Malaysia) Aniq Thaqif
- (Vietnam) Lê Sỹ Bách
- (Vietnam) Nguyễn Mạnh Cường

1 goal

- (Australia) Emile Katrib
- (Australia) Oliver O'Carroll
- (Cambodia) Sok Kryya Ly
- (Indonesia) Ridho
- (Indonesia) Dava Yunna
- (Laos) Phoutphatai Chanthalangsy
- (Laos) Anousa Silipanya
- (Laos) Anoulak Singsavang
- (Malaysia) Fareez Danial
- (Malaysia) Adam Haikal
- (Malaysia) Yusuf Nasrullah
- (Myanmar) Aung Thiha
- (Myanmar) Nyi Nyi Thant
- (Philippines) Joshua Moleje
- (Philippines) Jordan Villanueva
- (Singapore) Danish Abdul Hazin
- (Singapore) Ayden Haziq
- (Singapore) Aidan Irfan
- (Singapore) Gavriel Lai Keng Lum
- (Singapore) Aryan Sahib
- (Thailand) Worawit Boonthaokaeo
- (Thailand) Pattarawee Deebansok
- (Thailand) Prince Kouakou
- (Thailand) Sathaporn Phoojomjit
- (Thailand) Thodsadon Promsiridet
- (Thailand) Viphusit Seejan
- (Vietnam) Đào Quý Vương
- (Vietnam) Lê Trọng Đại Nhân
- (Vietnam) Trần Ngọc Sơn
- (Vietnam) Trần Trí Dũng
- (Vietnam) Trương Nguyễn Duy Khang

1 own goal

- (Brunei) Nurzharif Noradli (against Australia)
- (Laos) Nilandone Xayaseng (against Malaysia)
- (Philippines) Frank Bacara (against Thailand)

== Broadcasting rights ==
Broadcasters in Southeast Asia who acquired rights to the tournament include:

Territory	Broadcaster(s)	Ref.
Cambodia	Hang Meas HDTV	
Indonesia	Indosiar; Vidio.com	
Thailand	BG Sports	
Myanmar	Readers Channel	
Vietnam	TV360	

== See also ==
- 2026 ASEAN Championship
- 2026 ASEAN U-19 Boys' Championship
