= Timor-Leste national under-16 football team =

Timor-Leste U-17
- Nickname(s): O Sol Nascente (The Raising Sun), The Little Samba Nation, El Lafaek
- Association: Federação de Futebol de Timor-Leste
- Confederation: AFC (Asia)
- Head coach: (Japan) Shota Tokunaga
- Captain: João Pedro
- Most caps: Dom Lucas; Fidel de Araujo; Filomeno Junior; João Pedro; José Fonseca; Nidio Alves; Paulo Gali (9)
- Top scorer: Paulo Gali (11)
- Home stadium: Timor-Leste National Stadium
- FIFA code: TLS
First colours	Second colours

First international
- China 0–0 Timor-Leste (Hebei, China; 21 September 2009)

Biggest win
- Timor-Leste 13–0 Macau (Hebei, China; 28 September 2009)

Biggest defeat
- China 14–0 Timor-Leste (Chongqing, China; 24 November 2025)

AFC U-17 Asian Cup
- Appearances: 1 (first in 2010)
- Best result: Round 1 (2010)

ASEAN U-16 Boys' Championship
- Appearances: 9 (first in 2010)
- Best result: Third place (2010)

The Timor-Leste national Under-17 football team, formerly the under-16 team is a national team of Timor-Leste and is controlled by the Federação de Futebol de Timor-Leste. Timor-Leste has never had success on the international stage. They are currently one of the weakest teams in the world. Timor-Leste joined FIFA on 12 September 2005.

== Competitive record ==
=== FIFA U-17 World Cup ===
FIFA U-17 World Cup
Year	Round	GP	W	D	L	GF	GA
(Peru) 2005	Withdrew						
(South Korea) 2007	Did not enter						
(Nigeria) 2009	Withdrew						
(Mexico) 2011	Did not qualify						
(United Arab Emirates) 2013	Did not qualify						
(Chile) 2015	Did not enter						
(India) 2017	Did not qualify						
(Brazil) 2019	Did not qualify						
(Indonesia) 2023	Withdrew						
(Qatar) 2025	Did not enter						
(Qatar) 2026	Did not qualify						
(Qatar) 2027	Did not enter						
Total	N/A	0	0	0	0	0	0

=== AFC U-16 Championship ===
AFC U-16 Championship
Year	Round	GP	W	D	L	GF	GA
(Japan) 2004	Withdrew						
(Singapore) 2006	Did not enter						
(Uzbekistan) 2008	Withdrew						
(Uzbekistan) 2010	Group Stage	3	0	0	3	1	9
(Iran) 2012	Did not qualify						
(Thailand) 2014	Did not enter						
(India) 2016	Did not qualify						
(Malaysia) 2018	Did not qualify						
(Bahrain) 2020	Cancelled						
(Thailand) 2023	Withdrew						
(Saudi Arabia) 2025	Did not enter						
(Saudi Arabia) 2026	Did not qualify						
(Uzbekistan) 2027	Did not enter						
Total	Group Stage	3	0	0	3	1	9

AFC U-16 Championship History
Year	Round	Score	Result
2010	Round 1	Timor-Leste 0 – 5 Australia	Loss
2010	Round 1	Timor-Leste 0 – 1 Japan	Loss
2010	Round 1	Timor-Leste 1 – 3 Vietnam	Loss

=== AFF U-16 Youth Championship Record ===
AFF U-16 Championship
Year	Round	GP	W	D	L	GF	GA
(Thailand) 2005	No Participation						
(Vietnam) 2006	No Participation						
(Cambodia) 2007	No Participation						
(Indonesia) 2008	No Participation						
(Thailand) 2009	Tournament Cancelled						
(Indonesia) 2010	Third place	4	2	0	2	4	3
(Laos) 2011	Group Stage	4	0	1	3	5	14
(Laos) 2012	No Participation						
(Myanmar) 2013	No Participation						
(Indonesia) 2014	Tournament Cancelled						
(Cambodia) 2015	Group Stage	5	1	2	2	9	11
(Cambodia) 2016	Group Stage	4	1	1	2	4	7
(Thailand) 2017	Group Stage	5	0	1	4	0	9
(Indonesia) 2018	Group Stage	5	2	0	3	8	12
(Thailand) 2019	Group Stage	5	3	1	1	15	4
(Indonesia) 2022	Group Stage	3	1	1	1	12	5
(Indonesia) 2024	Group Stage	3	0	0	3	0	23
(Indonesia) 2026	Group Stage	3	0	0	3	0	16
Total	Third place	41	10	7	24	57	104

== Players ==
=== Current squad ===
The following 23 players were called up for the 2026 AFC U-17 Asian Cup qualification.

No.	Pos.	Player	Date of birth (age)	Club
1	GK	Levedinho	6 June 2009 (aged 16)	
12	GK	João Baptista	23 April 2009 (aged 16)	
20	GK	Joelnovo Baptista	31 December 2010 (aged 15)	
4	DF	Reinaldo	6 May 2009 (aged 16)	
16	DF	Gabriel Cardoso	15 November 2009 (aged 16)	
21	DF	Benedito	10 July 2009 (aged 16)	
2	DF	Salsinha	18 January 2009 (aged 17)	
5	DF	Inigo Martins	22 September 2009 (aged 16)	(East Timor Football Federation) DIT
14	DF	Florindo Magno	25 February 2009 (aged 17)	
18	DF	Filomeno da Silva	18 March 2009 (aged 17)	
22	DF	Jermias Zeus Tukan	26 February 2009 (aged 17)	
15	DF	Dramicio Augusto	13 March 2009 (aged 17)	(East Timor Football Federation) Emmanuel FC
6	MF	Jeronimo Nono	7 January 2009 (aged 17)	
8	MF	Paulo Braz (captain)	6 May 2009 (aged 16)	
11	MF	Elton Givanio	19 January 2009 (aged 17)	
19	MF	Geovanio		
9	FW	Gilson Xigueda	18 October 2010 (aged 15)	
11	FW	Germano Junior	13 April 2009 (aged 16)	(East Timor Football Federation) Sport Laulara e Benfica
23	FW	Quevin	7 February 2009 (aged 17)	
22	FW	Augusto Faustino	4 September 2009 (aged 16)	
10	FW	Jyzeus Lay	17 March 2009 (aged 17)	
7	FW	Tomas Rutkowski	30 June 2009 (aged 16)	(Football Australia) Hume City
17	FW	Manuel Reinaldo	16 May 2009 (aged 16)	(East Timor Football Federation) Karketu Dili

== List of Captains ==
Captain	Captaining period	Tournaments
Nelson Sing	2009–2010	2010 AFC U-16 Championship qualification 2010 AFF U-16 Youth Championship; 2010 AFC U-16 Championship
Eusébio Pereira	2011	2011 AFF U-16 Youth Championship; 2012 AFC U-16 Championship qualification
Julião	July–August 2015	2015 AFF U-16 Youth Championship
João Pedro	September 2015	2016 AFC U-16 Championship qualification
Osvaldo Belo	2016	2016 AFF U-16 Youth Championship
Paulo Braz	2026	2026 ASEAN U-17 Boys' Championship

== List of Coaches ==
Coach	Coaching period	Pld	W	D	L	Achievements
(South Korea) Kim Shin-hwan	2009-2010	12	6	1	5	2010 AFC U-16 Championship qualification - Qualify; 2010 AFF U-16 Youth Championship - Third place (First Time); 2010 AFC U-16 Championship - Round 1 (First Time)
(Japan) Norio Tsukitate	2011	8	0	1	7	2011 AFF U-16 Youth Championship - Round 1; 2012 AFC U-16 Championship qualification - Did not qualify
(Timor-Leste) Agostinho Martins	2015	9	3	3	3	2015 AFF U-16 Youth Championship - Round 1; 2016 AFC U-16 Championship qualification - Did not qualify
(Japan) Shota Tokunaga	2016-	4	1	1	2	2016 AFF U-16 Youth Championship - Round 1

=== Recent results ===
2026 Result

2026 ASEAN U-17 Boys' Championship

13 March 2026 Group A Match 1	Indonesia	4-0	Timor-Leste	East Java, Indonesia
14:30 WIB (UTC+07:00)				Stadium: Gelora Joko Samudro

2025 Result

2026 AFC U-17 Asian Cup qualification

24 November 2025 2026 AFC U17 Q	China	14–0	Timor-Leste	Chongqing, China
15:00 TLT		Report		Stadium: Yongchuan Sports Center

22 November 2025 2026 AFC U17 Q	Bangladesh	5–0	Timor-Leste	Chongqing, China
15:00 TLT	Kazi 11'; Manik 28', 43'; Bostami 49'; Ahmmed 88'	Report		Stadium: Tongliang Long Stadium

26 November 2025 2026 AFC U17 Q	Timor-Leste	0–3	Bahrain	Chongqing, China
15:00 TLT		Report		Stadium: Tongliang Long Stadium

28 November 2025 2026 AFC U17 Q	Brunei	0–2	Timor-Leste	Chongqing, China
16:00 TLT		Report		Stadium: Yongchuan Sports Center

30 November 2025 2026 AFC U17 Q	Timor-Leste	2–1	Sri Lanka	Chongqing, China
20:35 TLT		Report		Stadium: Tongliang Long Stadium

== Stadium ==
- Timor-Leste National Stadium (2002-present)

== Head-to-head record ==
The following table shows Timor-Leste's head-to-head record in the AFC U-17 Asian Cup.

Opponent	Pld	W	D	L	GF	GA	GD	Win %
Australia	1	0	0	1	0	5	−5	0.00
Japan	1	0	0	1	0	1	−1	0.00
Vietnam	1	0	0	1	1	3	−2	0.00
Total	3	0	0	3	1	9	−8	0.00
