= Australia men's national under-17 soccer team =

National association football team

Australia Under-17
- Nickname: Joeys
- Association: Football Australia
- Confederation: AFC (Asia)
- Sub-confederation: AFF (Southeast Asia)
- Head coach: Carl Veart
- Captain: Besian Kutleshi
- FIFA code: AUS
First colours	Second colours

First international
- Australia 2–1 New Zealand (New Zealand; 3 December 1983)

Biggest win
- Australia 30–0 American Samoa (Apia, Samoa; 5 December 2001)

Biggest defeat
- Australia 0–6 Japan (Bambolim, India; 22 September 2016)

FIFA U-17 World Cup
- Appearances: 14 (first in 1985)
- Best result: Runners-up (1999)

AFC U-17 Asian Cup
- Appearances: 10 (first in 2008)
- Best result: Semi-finals (2010, 2014, 2018, 2026)

ASEAN U-16 Boys' Championship
- Appearances: 8 (first in 2008)
- Best result: Champions; 2008, 2016, 2024
- Website: www.socceroos.com.au/joeys-u17s

The Australia national under-17 soccer team, known as the Joeys or Subway Joeys for sponsorship reasons, represents Australia in men's international under-17 soccer. The team is controlled by the governing body for Football in Australia, Football Australia (FA), which is currently a member of the Asian Football Confederation (AFC) and the regional ASEAN Football Federation (AFF) since leaving the Oceania Football Confederation (OFC) in 2006.

Australia is a ten-time OFC champion and a two-time AFF champion. The team has represented Australia at the FIFA U-17 World Cup tournaments on twelve occasions.

== History ==
=== 1999 U-17 World Championship ===
The Joeys best result in international football came in the 1999 FIFA U-17 World Championship hosted by New Zealand, where Australia finished second.

To qualify for the tournament Australia had to first win the Oceania qualifiers. This was achieved with wins over Fiji, Papua New Guinea, Cook Islands, American Samoa, Vanuatu, New Caledonia and again Fiji in the final which finished 5–0. Next up was a two leg play-off against Bahrain who had finished third in the 1998 AFC U-17 Championship. Australia won 3–1 on aggregate.

In the tournament proper, Australia lost their opening game 2–1 to Brazil although a come from behind 2–1 win over Germany and a 1–0 win over Mali saw Australia top the group. Australia dispatched of Qatar 1–0 in the quarter final and needed penalties to get past USA after a 2–2 draw in the semi-final. They lost the final to Brazil; the match finished nil all after extra time and Brazil won a penalty shoot-out 8–7.

A number of this Joeys squad would go on to represent the Socceroos including Adrian Madaschi, Jade North, Joshua Kennedy and Scott McDonald.

== Players ==
=== Current U-17 squad ===
The following 21 players were called up for the 2026 FIFA U-17 World Cup from 19 November – 13 December.

Caps and goals correct as of the game against Argentina on 19 November 2026.

No.	Pos.	Player	Date of birth (age)	Caps	Goals	Club
1	GK	Charlie Wilson-Papps	13 September 2009 (age 17)	9	0	(The Football Association) Brighton & Hove Albion
12	GK	Lachlan Allen	4 April 2009 (age 17)	8	0	(Football Australia) Western Sydney Wanderers
18	GK	Hugo Ng	3 January 2009 (age 17)	3	0	(Football Australia) Adelaide United
2	DF	Max Lyall-Rajendra	26 December 2009 (age 16)	1	0	(The Football Association) Bournemouth
4	DF	Marcus Savic	21 March 2009 (age 17)	16	1	(Football Australia) Western Sydney Wanderers
5	DF	Arnie Mitchell	6 May 2009 (age 17)	5	0	(Football Australia) Brisbane Roar
6	DF	Besian Kutleshi (Captain)	28 February 2009 (age 17)	19	0	(Football Australia) Melbourne City
13	DF	Callum McCaskey	20 March 2009 (age 17)	1	0	(Football Australia) Central Coast Mariners
15	DF	Emile Katrib	17 July 2009 (age 17)	13	1	(Football Australia) Western Sydney Wanderers
17	DF	Harrison Bond	19 January 2009 (age 17)	4	0	(Austrian Football Association) Red Bull Salzburg
3	MF	Emmett Shaw	4 March 2009 (age 17)	3	0	(Football Australia) Brisbane Roar
7	MF	Henrique Oliveira	17 January 2009 (age 17)	12	3	(Football Australia) Macarthur FC
8	MF	Jariyah Shah	25 May 2009 (age 17)	5	1	(The Football Association) Manchester United
14	MF	Oliver O'Carroll	16 May 2009 (age 17)	11	2	(Football Australia) Central Coast Mariners
19	MF	Dionn Nigro	19 August 2009 (age 17)	3	0	(Football Australia) Sydney FC
21	MF	Sajjad Nasiri	3 February 2009 (age 17)	12	0	(Football Australia) Adelaide United
9	FW	Luke Becvinovski	4 May 2009 (age 17)	16	10	(Football Australia) Central Coast Mariners
10	FW	Akol Akon	21 May 2009 (age 17)	14	4	(Football Australia) Sydney FC
11	FW	Max Court	16 January 2009 (age 17)	12	6	(Football Australia) APIA Leichhardt
16	FW	Akeem Gerald	1 February 2010 (age 16)	10	1	(Football Australia) Melbourne City
20	FW	Georgio Hassarati	3 March 2009 (age 17)	17	18	(Football Australia) Western Sydney Wanderers

=== Current U-16 squad ===
The following 23 players were called up for the 2026 CFA Team China U-16 Cup in September – 2026.

No.	Pos.	Player	Date of birth (age)	Caps	Goals	Club
	GK	Maxim Atkinson		0	0	(Football Australia) Melbourne Victory
	GK	Laris Cesko		1	0	(Football Australia) Adelaide United
	GK	Clayton Jones		0	0	(Football Australia) Brisbane Roar
	DF	Dhaniel Brown		0	0	(Football Australia) Perth Glory
	DF	Eddie Dunne		0	0	(Football Australia) Brisbane Roar
	DF	Ned Howell		0	0	(Football Australia) Manly United
	DF	Charley Kassis		0	0	(Football Australia) Macarthur Bulls
	DF	Denver Minster	9 June 2010 (age 16)	0	0	(Football Australia) Adelaide United
	DF	Jake Pilovski		1	0	(Football Australia) Melbourne City
	DF	Eden Smoli		0	0	(Football Australia) Sydney FC
	DF	Kaiden Walshe		1	0	(Football Australia) Newcastle Jets
	MF	Kalan Alagich	2 July 2010 (age 16)	0	0	(Football Australia) Adelaide United
	MF	Kallum Chalker		0	0	(Football Australia) Brisbane Roar
	MF	Luka Demuth	24 January 2010 (age 16)	10	1	(Football Australia) Melbourne City
	MF	Tyler Hogan		0	0	(Football Australia) Sydney FC
	MF	Kai Satilmis		0	0	(Football Australia) Melbourne City
	MF	Dimitri Staveris		0	0	(Football Australia) Sydney FC
	FW	Maalek Bakkar		0	0	(Football Australia) Melbourne City
	FW	Zachary Harrison		3	2	(Football Australia) Sydney FC
	FW	Noah Hoopers		0	0	(Football Australia) Central Coast Mariners
	FW	Jack Middleby		0	0	(Football Australia) Sydney FC
	FW	Riad Rarhidi		0	0	(Football Australia) Adelaide United
	FW	Jake Tadrosse		0	0	(Football Australia) Sydney FC

=== Recent call-ups ===
The following players have been called up within the last 12 months and remain eligible for selection.

Pos.	Player	Date of birth (age)	Caps	Goals	Club	Latest call-up
GK	Mitchell Bright		2	0	(Australia) Brisbane Roar	2026 CFA U17 Invitational, 5–13 July 2026
GK	Aaron Black		1	0	(Australia) Perth Glory	2026 ASEAN U-17 Boys' Championship, 11–24 April 2026
GK	Cooper Winqvist		1	0	(Sweden) Sirius	2026 PacificAus Sports Football Tour, 17–24 January 2026
DF	Fraser Brown	29 August 2009 (age 17)	5	0	(Australia) Melbourne City	2026 U17 Copa España, 21 September – 2 October
DF	Ethan Fletcher		2	0	(Australia) Sydney FC	2026 U17 Copa España, 21 September – 2 October
DF	William Kengni		8	0	(Australia) Melbourne Victory	2026 U17 Copa España, 21 September – 2 October
DF	Dominic Aravanis		2	0	(Australia) Melbourne City	2026 CFA U17 Invitational, 5–13 July 2026
DF	Lucas Chandler		2	0	(Australia) Brisbane Roar	2026 CFA U17 Invitational, 5–13 July 2026
DF	Oliver Dimovski		4	0	(Australia) Melbourne Victory	2026 CFA U17 Invitational, 5–13 July 2026
DF	Winston Ashburner	2 February 2009 (age 17)	10	0	(Australia) Melbourne Victory	2026 AFC U-17 Asian Cup, 5–22 May 2026
DF	Miles Milliner	10 August 2009 (age 17)	18	2	(Australia) Sydney FC	2026 AFC U-17 Asian Cup, 5–22 May 2026
DF	Stevan Rujak	29 August 2009 (age 17)	5	0	(Australia) Western Sydney Wanderers	2026 AFC U-17 Asian Cup, 5–22 May 2026
DF	Deklan Cooper-Ndambuki		3	0	(Australia) Adelaide United	2026 AFC U-17 Asian Cup qualifiers, 22–30 November 2025
MF	Aston Reid	2 April 2009 (age 17)	15	3	(Australia) Sydney FC	2026 U17 Copa España, 21 September – 2 October
MF	Sebastian Siegler	4 March 2009 (age 17)	0	0	(United States) Colorado Rapids	2026 U17 Copa España, 21 September – 2 October
MF	Ryan Buttigieg		5	1	(Australia) Sydney FC	2026 CFA U17 Invitational, 5–13 July 2026
MF	Keron Longhe		1	0	(Australia) Adelaide United	2026 CFA U17 Invitational, 5–13 July 2026
MF	Johnny Pavlovic		5	1	(Australia) Western Sydney Wanderers	2026 CFA U17 Invitational, 5–13 July 2026
MF	Daniel Wojcik		1	0	(Australia) Adelaide United	2026 CFA U17 Invitational, 5–13 July 2026
MF	Corey Da Cruz	24 April 2009 (age 17)	9	2	(Australia) Sydney FC	2026 AFC U-17 Asian Cup, 5–22 May 2026
MF	Nate Robson		1	0	(Australia) Western Sydney Wanderers	2026 ASEAN U-17 Boys' Championship, 11–24 April 2026
MF	Taj Sorensen		3	0	(Australia) Logan Lightning	2026 PacificAus Sports Football Tour, 17–24 January 2026
MF	Lenny Van Heer		2	0	(Sweden) Djurgårdens IF	2026 AFC U-17 Asian Cup qualifiers, 22–30 November 2025
FW	Malik Olukhale		7	2	(Australia) Melbourne Victory	2026 U17 Copa España, 21 September – 2 October
FW	Mustafa Abdellatif		2	0	(Australia) Western Sydney Wanderers	2026 CFA U17 Invitational, 5–13 July 2026
FW	Max Linton		2	1	(Australia) Wollongong Wolves	2026 CFA U17 Invitational, 5–13 July 2026
FW	Cristian Lombardo		5	3	(Australia) APIA Leichhardt	2026 CFA U17 Invitational, 5–13 July 2026
FW	Lucas Sands		2	0	(United Arab Emirates) Al Nasr	2026 CFA U17 Invitational, 5–13 July 2026
FW	Joey Sikora		6	3	(Australia) Sydney FC	2026 CFA U17 Invitational, 5–13 July 2026
FW	Gabriel Lombardi	9 April 2009 (age 17)	2	0	(Italy) Parma	2026 AFC U-17 Asian Cup, 5–22 May 2026
FW	Achnaff Sayon		2	2	(Australia) Perth Glory	2026 ASEAN U-17 Boys' Championship, 11–24 April 2026
FW	Chris Irakoze		5	0	(Australia) Adelaide United	2026 AFC U-17 Asian Cup qualifiers, 22–30 November 2025

== Results and fixtures ==
The following is a list of match results in the last 12 months, as well as any future matches that have been scheduled.

Legend

Win Draw Loss Fixture

=== 2025 ===
24 November AFC U-17 Asian Cup qualifiers	Jordan	0–1	Australia	Aqaba, Jordan
16:00 UTC+3		Report	Court 54'	Stadium: Al-Aqaba Stadium

26 November AFC U-17 Asian Cup qualifiers	Australia	3–0	Bhutan	Aqaba, Jordan
19:00 UTC+3	Olukhale 48'; Reid 52'; Becvinovski 75'	Report		Stadium: Al-Aqaba Stadium

28 November AFC U-17 Asian Cup qualifiers	Philippines	0–6	Australia	Aqaba, Jordan
16:00 UTC+3		Report	Hassarati 4', 23', 60', 76'; Oliveira 6'; Shah 90'	Stadium: Al-Aqaba Stadium

30 November AFC U-17 Asian Cup qualifiers	Australia	3–3	Iraq	Aqaba, Jordan
19:00 UTC+3	Court 30' (pen.), 36'; Becvinovski 74'	Report	Al-Nasari 48'; Hayder 61', 69'	Stadium: Al-Aqaba Stadium

=== 2026 ===
17 January 2026 PacificAus Sports Football Tour	Fiji	0–2	Australia	Lautoka, Fiji
		Report	Court 19'; Sikora 65'	Stadium: Churchill Park

20 January 2026 PacificAus Sports Football Tour	Solomon Islands	2–5	Australia	Honiara, Solomon Islands
	Fiumae 14'; Abana 45+3'	Report	Becvinovski 7', 49', 65'; Lombardo 36'; Court 82' (pen.)	Stadium: National Stadium

24 January 2026 PacificAus Sports Football Tour	Solomon Islands	1–3	Australia	Honiara, Solomon Islands
	Abana 58'	Report	Olukhale 19'; Hassarati 71'; Becvinovski 89'	Stadium: National Stadium

11 April 2026 ASEAN Boys' Championship GS	Australia	12–0	Brunei	Sidoarjo, Indonesia
15:30 UTC+7	Hassarati 3', 35', 56', 58', 81'; O'Carroll 31'; Da Cruz 34', 74'; Sayon 45+1', 49'; Katrib 52'; Zharif 70' (o.g.)	Report		Stadium: Gelora Delta Stadium; Referee: Alongkorn Khonwai (Thailand)

14 April 2026 ASEAN Boys' Championship GS	Singapore	0–1	Australia	Sidoarjo, Indonesia
19:30 UTC+7		Report	Becvinovski 90+5'	Stadium: Gelora Delta Stadium; Referee: Đỗ Khánh Nam (Vietnam)

17 April 2026 ASEAN Boys' Championship GS	Australia	2–0	Cambodia	Sidoarjo, Indonesia
15:30 UTC+7	Hassarati 8'; Sikora 80'	Report		Stadium: Gelora Delta Stadium; Referee: Muhammad Izzul Fikri Kamaruzaman (Malaysia)

22 April 2026 ASEAN Boys' Championship SF	Vietnam	2–1	Australia	Sidoarjo, Indonesia
19:30 UTC+7	Nguyễn Mạnh Cường 45+4'; Chu Ngọc Nguyễn Lực 61'	Report	Becvinovski 9'	Stadium: Gelora Delta Stadium; Referee: Yusuke Ohashi (Japan)

24 April 2026 ASEAN Boys' Championship TP	Laos	0–8	Australia	Sidoarjo, Indonesia
15:30 UTC+7		Report	Sikora 20'; Hassarati 29' (pen.), 31', 40', 51', 90+5'; A. Reid 44', 58'	Stadium: Gelora Delta Stadium; Referee: Alongkorn Khonwai (Thailand)

6 May 2026 Asian Cup GS	Australia	4–0	India	Jeddah, Saudi Arabia
19:00 UTC+3	Becvinovski 4'; Court 29' (pen.); Demuth 74'; Oliveira 86'	Report		Stadium: King Abdullah Sports City Training Stadium; Referee: Lothar D'hondt (Belgium)

10 May 2026 Asian Cup GS	North Korea	Cancelled (Note: North Korea withdrew due to concerns related to the 2026 Iran war, leaving the tournament at 15 teams.)	Australia	Jeddah, Saudi Arabia
20:30 UTC+3		Source		Stadium: King Abdullah Sports City Training Stadium

13 May 2026 Asian Cup GS	Uzbekistan	2–0	Australia	Jeddah, Saudi Arabia
19:00 UTC+3	Murodov 28'; Ravshanbekov 45'	Report		Stadium: King Abdullah Sports City Training Stadium; Referee: Yahya Al-Balushi (Oman)

16 May 2026 Asian Cup QF	Vietnam	0–3	Australia	Jeddah, Saudi Arabia
20:00 UTC+3		Report	O'Carroll 40'; Hassarati 60'; Gerald 75'	Stadium: King Abdullah Sports City Training Stadium; Attendance: 25; Referee: Sultan Al-Hammadi (United Arab Emirates)

19 May 2026 Asian Cup SF	China	2–0	Australia	Jeddah, Saudi Arabia
21:30 UTC+3	Shuai Weihao 48'; Xie Jin 90'	Report		Stadium: King Abdullah Sports City Hall Stadium; Attendance: 306; Referee: Abdullah Al-Shehri (Saudi Arabia)

5 July CFA U17 Invitational Tournament	China	3–0	Australia	Yinchuan, China
19:35 UTC+8	Shuai Weihao 5'; Zhao Songyuan 53'; Sun Chenxi 88'	Report		Stadium: Helan Mountain Stadium; Attendance: 26,836; Referee: Du Jianxin (China)

8 July CFA U17 Invitational Tournament	Australia	4–2	Nigeria	Yinchuan, China
16:00 UTC+8	Lombardo; Savic; Harrison	Report	?; ?	Stadium: Helan Mountain Stadium

11 July CFA U17 Invitational Tournament	Tanzania	5–3	Australia	Yinchuan, China
16:00 UTC+8	Chenga; Hussein; Mbengelendi	Report	Harrison; Linton; Buttigieg	Stadium: Helan Mountain Stadium; Referee: Tian Jin (China)

24 September Copa España U17	Panama	1–0	Australia	Salou, Spain
16:00 CEDT	López	Report		Stadium: Mediterranean Sports Complex

29 September Copa España U17	Morocco	0–0	Australia	Salou, Spain
16:00 CEDT		Report		Stadium: Mediterranean Sports Complex

19 November 2026 World Cup GS	Argentina	0–2	Australia	Al Rayyan, Qatar
19:00		Report	Güich 60' (o.g.); Akon 71'	Stadium: Aspire Zone; Referee: Michael Venne (Canada)

22 November 2026 World Cup GS	Denmark	v	Australia	Al Rayyan, Qatar
15:30		Source		Stadium: Aspire Zone

25 November 2026 World Cup GS	Australia	v	Mozambique	Al Rayyan, Qatar
18:30		Source		Stadium: Aspire Zone

==== Younger cohort ====
24 September CFA U16 Invitational Tournament	Australia	4–2	Vietnam	Shenyang, China
14:00 CST	Harrison 28', 56'; Hooper 66' (pen.); Vương Đình Minh Quang 34' (o.g.)	Report	Nguyễn Văn Cảnh 21'; Nguyễn Minh Nhật 71'	Stadium: Shenhe District Cultural and Sports Center Stadium

27 September CFA U16 Invitational Tournament	Kyrgyzstan	2–2	Australia	Shenyang, China
19:35 CST	44'; 90'	Report	Hogan 71'; Dunne 71'	Stadium: Shenhe District Cultural and Sports Center Stadium

30 September CFA U16 Invitational Tournament	China	0–1	Australia	Shenyang, China
19:35 CST		Report	Harrison 34'	Stadium: Shenhe District Cultural and Sports Center Stadium

== Coaching staff ==
Position	Name
Head coach	(Australia) Carl Veart
Assistant coach	(Australia) Michael Cooper
Assistant coach	(Australia) Aaron Mooy
Fitness coach	(Australia) Nathan Burns
Goalkeeper coach	(Italy) Davide Del Giovine
Team analyst	(Australia) Robert Cornthwaite (soccer)
Technical consultant	(England) Ron Smith

== Competitive record ==
=== FIFA U-17 World Cup ===
FIFA U-17 World Cup record
Year	Result	Position	Pld	W	D	L	GF	GA
(China) 1985	Quarter-finals	5th	4	3	1	0	4	1
(Canada) 1987	Quarter-finals	6th	4	2	0	2	3	5
(Scotland) 1989	Group stage	14th	3	0	1	2	3	6
(Italy) 1991	Quarter-finals	7th	4	2	0	2	7	6
(Japan) 1993	Quarter-finals	6th	4	1	1	2	7	5
(Ecuador) 1995	Quarter-finals	6th	4	1	1	2	6	7
(Egypt) 1997	Did not qualify							
(New Zealand) 1999	Runners-up	2nd	6	3	2	1	7	5
(Trinidad and Tobago) 2001	Quarter-finals	8th	4	2	0	2	6	6
(Finland) 2003	Group stage	16th	3	0	0	3	1	6
(Peru) 2005	Group stage	12th	3	1	0	2	2	5
(South Korea) 2007	Did not qualify							
(Nigeria) 2009	Did not qualify							
(Mexico) 2011	Round of 16	15th	4	1	1	2	3	7
(United Arab Emirates) 2013	Did not qualify							
(Chile) 2015	Round of 16	16th	4	1	1	2	3	11
(India) 2017	Did not qualify							
(Brazil) 2019	Round of 16	15th	4	1	1	2	5	9
(Indonesia) 2023	Did not qualify							
(Qatar) 2025	Did not qualify							
(Qatar) 2026	In progress	TBD	2	1	1	0	2	0
(Qatar) 2027	To be determined							
(Qatar) 2028	To be determined							
(Qatar) 2029	To be determined							
Total:14/24	Runners-up	2nd	53	19	10	24	59	79

=== OFC U-17 Championship ===
OFC U-17 Championship record
Year	Round	Pos	Pld	W	D*	L	GF	GA
(New Zealand) 1983	Champions	1st	5	5	0	0	22	2
(Chinese Taipei) 1986	Champions	1st	4	3	0	1	10	1
(Australia) 1989	Champions	1st	4	4	0	0	35	1
(New Zealand) 1991	Champions	1st	4	3	1	0	15	4
(New Zealand) 1993	Champions	1st	4	4	0	0	12	1
(Vanuatu) 1995	Champions	1st	3	3	0	0	11	0
(New Zealand) 1997	Runners-up	2nd	5	4	0	1	30	1
(Fiji) 1999	Champions	1st	7	7	0	0	55	1
(Samoa) (Vanuatu) 2001	Champions	1st	6	6	0	0	52	0
(American Samoa) (Australia) (New Caledonia) 2003	Champions	1st	7	7	0	0	40	3
(New Caledonia) 2005	Champions	1st	5	5	0	0	38	0
Total	10 titles	11/11	54	51	1	2	320	13

=== AFC U-17 Asian Cup ===
AFC U-17 Asian Cup record
Year	Result	Position	Pld	W	D	L	GF	GA
(Singapore) 2006	did not qualify							
(Uzbekistan) 2008	Quarter-finals	5th	4	3	0	1	13	5
(Uzbekistan) 2010	Semi-finals	4th	5	3	1	1	12	5
(Iran) 2012	Quarter-finals	6th	4	2	1	1	5	6
(Thailand) 2014	Semi-finals	3rd	5	4	1	0	12	4
(India) 2016	Group stage	16th	3	0	0	3	2	10
(Malaysia) 2018	Semi-finals	4th	5	3	0	2	10	9
(Bahrain) ~~2020~~	Cancelled due to the COVID-19 pandemic							
(Thailand) 2023	Quarter-finals	8th	4	2	0	2	8	8
(Saudi Arabia) 2025	Group stage	9th	3	1	1	1	4	5
(Saudi Arabia) 2026	Semi-finals	4th	4	2	0	2	7	4
(Saudi Arabia) 2027	Qualified							
Total:9/10	Semi-finals	3rd	37	20	4	13	73	56

=== AFF U-16/U-17 Youth Championship ===
AFF U-16 Youth Championship record
Year	Result	Position	Pld	W	D	L	GF	GA
(Indonesia) 2008	Champions	1st	5	3	2	0	14	4
(Thailand) ~~2009~~	Cancelled							
(Indonesia) 2010	did not participate							
(Laos) 2011	did not participate							
(Laos) 2012	Runners-up	2nd	4	2	1	1	9	8
(Myanmar) 2013	Third place	3rd	6	4	2	0	30	2
(Indonesia) ~~2014~~	Cancelled							
(Cambodia) 2015	Third place	3rd	6	5	0	1	36	8
(Cambodia) 2016	Champions	1st	7	3	3	1	27	13
(Thailand) 2017	Third place	3rd	7	5	0	2	27	10
(Indonesia) 2018	did not participate							
(Thailand) 2019	Group Stage	6th	5	3	1	1	11	5
(Indonesia) 2022	Group Stage	10th	3	0	1	2	6	9
(Indonesia) 2024	Champions	1st	5	3	2	0	20	6
(Indonesia) 2026	to be determined							
Total	9/12	3 Titles	48	28	12	8	175	67

AFF U-16 Youth Championship history
First match	Australia 2–1 Bahrain (9 July 2008; Jakarta, Indonesia)
Biggest win	Brunei 0–19 Australia (24 August 2013; Naypyidaw, Myanmar)
Biggest defeat	Vietnam 3–0 Australia (12 July 2016; Phnom Penh, Cambodia); Australia 0–3 Malaysia (1 August 2019; Chonburi, Thailand)
Best result	Champions 3 times (2008, 2016, 2024)
Worst result	Group stage 2 times (2019, 2022)

== Head-to-head record ==
The following table shows Australia's head-to-head record in the FIFA U-17 World Cup and AFC U-17 Asian Cup.

=== In FIFA U-17 World Cup ===
Opponent	Pld	W	D	L	GF	GA	GD	Win %
Argentina	6	3	1	2	8	7	+1	50.00
Brazil	7	1	1	5	4	10	−6	14.29
Canada	1	1	0	0	5	0	+5	100.00
Congo	2	2	0	0	4	1	+3	100.00
Costa Rica	1	0	0	1	0	2	−2	0.00
Croatia	1	1	0	0	4	0	+4	100.00
Denmark	2	0	2	0	1	1	+0	0.00
East Germany	1	0	0	1	0	1	−1	0.00
Ecuador	1	0	0	1	1	2	−1	0.00
France	2	0	0	2	1	8	−7	0.00
Germany	3	2	0	1	4	5	−1	66.67
Ghana	1	0	0	1	0	1	−1	0.00
Guinea	1	0	1	0	0	0	+0	0.00
Hungary	1	0	1	0	2	2	+0	0.00
Ivory Coast	1	1	0	0	2	1	+1	100.00
Mali	1	1	0	0	1	0	+1	100.00
Mexico	3	1	1	1	4	6	−2	33.33
Mozambique	0	0	0	0	—	—		
Nigeria	7	1	0	6	4	19	−15	14.29
Qatar	3	2	0	1	4	1	+3	66.67
Saudi Arabia	1	1	0	0	1	0	+1	100.00
Spain	1	0	1	0	2	2	+0	0.00
Trinidad and Tobago	1	1	0	0	1	0	+1	100.00
Turkey	1	0	0	1	0	1	−1	0.00
United States	2	0	2	0	4	4	+0	0.00
Uruguay	1	1	0	0	2	1	+1	100.00
Uzbekistan	1	0	0	1	0	4	−4	0.00
Total	53	19	10	24	59	79	−20	35.85

=== In AFC U-17 Asian Cup ===
Opponent	Pld	W	D	L	GF	GA	GD	Win %
Afghanistan	1	1	0	0	4	0	+4	100.00
China	3	3	0	0	10	4	+6	100.00
Timor-Leste	1	1	0	0	5	0	+5	100.00
Hong Kong	1	1	0	0	2	0	+2	100.00
Indonesia	1	1	0	0	3	2	+1	100.00
Iran	1	0	0	1	1	5	−4	0.00
Iraq	2	1	1	0	2	1	+1	50.00
Japan	6	2	1	3	9	16	−7	33.33
Kyrgyzstan	1	0	0	1	0	1	−1	0.00
Malaysia	1	1	0	0	2	1	+1	100.00
North Korea	1	0	1	0	1	1	+0	0.00
Oman	1	1	0	0	2	1	+1	100.00
Saudi Arabia	2	1	0	1	3	3	+0	50.00
South Korea	1	0	0	1	0	3	−3	0.00
Tajikistan	1	1	0	0	2	0	+2	100.00
Thailand	1	1	0	0	2	0	+2	100.00
Turkmenistan	1	1	0	0	6	0	+6	100.00
United Arab Emirates	3	1	0	2	5	7	−2	33.33
Uzbekistan	1	0	0	1	1	2	−1	0.00
Vietnam	3	1	1	1	6	5	+1	33.33
Total	33	18	4	11	66	52	+14	54.55

== Honours ==
- FIFA U-17 World Cup
  - Runners-up (1): 1999
- OFC U-17 Championship
  - Champions (10): 1983, 1987, 1989, 1991, 1993, 1995, 1999, 2001, 2003, 2005
  - Runners-up (1): 1997
- AFF U-16 Championship
  - Champions (3): 2008, 2016, 2024
  - Runners-up (1): 2012
  - Third place (3): 2013, 2015, 2017
