= 2015 AFF U-16 Youth Championship =

Football tournament in Cambodia for under-16 youth players

2015 AFF U-16 Youth Championship ព្រឹត្តិការណ៍ AFF U16 Championship 2015
Tournament details
- Host country: Cambodia
- City: Phnom Penh
- Dates: 27 July – 9 August
- Teams: 11 (from 1 sub-confederation)
- Venue: 2 (in 1 host city)

Final positions
- Champions: Thailand (3rd title)
- Runners-up: Myanmar
- Third place: Australia
- Fourth place: Laos

Tournament statistics
- Matches played: 29
- Goals scored: 111 (3.83 per match)
- Top scorer(s): (Australia) Marc Moric (Australia) John Roberts (8 goals each)

The 2015 AFF U-16 Youth Championship is the 10th edition of the AFF U-16 Youth Championship, organised by the ASEAN Football Federation. It will be hosted by Cambodia for the second time after the 2007 AFF U-17 Youth Championship. It will be played between 27 July to 9 August 2015. It was set to be hosted by Indonesia but they were suspended by FIFA in May 2015.

== Participant teams ==
All twelve member associations of the ASEAN Football Federation were set to take part in the tournament featuring three groups of four teams, but with Indonesia's suspension, they were omitted and the AFF reverted to two groups featuring six and five teams.

The following groups were drawn at the 15th AFF Council meeting in Singapore on 16 June 2015.

Team	Association	App	Previous best performance
Cambodia (H)	FF Cambodia	6th	Group stage (5 times)
Australia	FF Australia	4th	Winners (2008)
Brunei	FA Brunei DS	4th	Group stage (3 times)
Laos	Lao FF	8th	Runners-up (2002, 2007, 2011)
Malaysia	FA Malaysia	7th	Winners (2013)
Myanmar	Myanmar FF	7th	Winners (2002, 2005)
Philippines	Philippine FF	4th	Group stage (3 times)
Singapore	FA Singapore	6th	Fourth place (2008, 2011)
Thailand	FA Thailand	6th	Winners (2007, 2011)
Timor-Leste	FF Timor-Leste	3rd	Third place (2010)
Vietnam	Vietnam FF	8th	Winners (2006, 2010)

== Venues ==
The two venues to host matches are Olympic Stadium and Army Stadium in Phnom Penh. The matches of Group A will be held in Olympic Stadium and Army Stadium; the matches of Group B will be held in Olympic Stadium and the matches of Knockout stage will be held in Olympic Stadium.

Phnom Penh
Olympic Stadium	Location of stadiums of the 2015 AFF U-16 Youth Championship.	Army Stadium
Capacity: 50,000	Location of stadiums of the 2015 AFF U-16 Youth Championship.	Capacity: 7,000

== Squads ==
Players born on or after 1 January 1999 are eligible to compete in the tournament. Each team can register a maximum of 23 players (minimum three of whom must be goalkeepers).

== Group stage ==
The top two teams of each group advance to the semi-finals.

Tiebreakers

The teams are ranked according to points (3 points for a win, 1 point for a draw, 0 points for a loss). If tied on points, tiebreakers are applied in the following order:

1. Greater number of points obtained in the group matches between the teams concerned;
2. Goal difference resulting from the group matches between the teams concerned;
3. Greater number of goals scored in the group matches between the teams concerned;
4. If, after applying criteria 1 to 3, teams still have an equal ranking, criteria 1 to 3 are reapplied exclusively to the matches between the teams in question to determine their final rankings. If this procedure does not lead to a decision, criteria 5 to 9 apply;
5. Goal difference in all the group matches;
6. Greater number of goals scored in all the group matches;
7. Penalty shoot-out if only two teams are involved and they are both on the field of play;
8. Lower score calculated according to the number of yellow and red cards received in the group matches (1 point for a single yellow card, 3 points for a red card as a consequence of two yellow cards, 3 points for a direct red card, 4 points for a yellow card followed by a direct red card);
9. Drawing of lots.
- All matches held in Phnom Penh, Cambodia.
- All times are local, UTC+7.

=== Group A ===
Pos	Team	Pld	W	D	L	GF	GA	GD	Pts	Qualification
1	Laos	5	4	1	0	10	4	+6	13	Knockout stage
2	Thailand	5	4	0	1	10	2	+8	12	Knockout stage
3	Malaysia	5	2	0	3	4	8	−4	6	
4	Vietnam	5	1	2	2	10	8	+2	5	
5	Timor-Leste	5	1	2	2	9	11	−2	5	
6	Brunei	5	0	1	4	3	13	−10	1	

Source: AFF
27 July 2015
15:30

Malaysia	1–0	Vietnam
Nguyễn Xuân Kiên 32' (o.g.)	Report

Army Stadium, Phnom Penh
Referee: Vichhika Tuy (Cambodia)
27 July 2015
15:30

Laos	1–0	Thailand
Bounkong 36'	Report

Olympic Stadium, Phnom Penh
Referee: Khin Maung Win (Myanmar)
27 July 2015
18:30

Timor-Leste	2–2	Brunei
Filomeno Costa 48'; Dom Braz 64'	Report	Hanif 44', 62'

Olympic Stadium, Phnom Penh
Referee: Clifford Daypuyat (Philippines)

29 July 2015
15:30

Laos	3–2	Timor-Leste
Bounkong 26', 51'; Nalin 66'	Report	Armindo Gusmao 3'; Filomeno Costa 12'

Army Stadium, Phnom Penh
Referee: Mohammad Hasrin Haji Samat (Brunei)
29 July 2015
15:30

Brunei	1–6	Vietnam
Hariz 66'	Report	Trần Văn Đạt 11', 88'; Nguyễn Hồng Sơn 22', 37'; Bùi Anh Đức 56'; Nguyễn Hữu Thắng 90+2'

Olympic Stadium, Phnom Penh
Referee: Thant Zin Oo (Myanmar)
29 July 2015
18:30

Thailand	3–1	Malaysia
Korawich Tasa 2'; Jinnawat Russamee 19', 35'	Report	Nizarruddin 88'

Olympic Stadium, Phnom Penh
Referee: Lim Bunthoeun (Cambodia)

31 July 2015
15:30

Malaysia	1–0	Brunei
Shaqirin 29'	Report

Olympic Stadium, Phnom Penh
Referee: Clifford Daypuyat (Philippines)
31 July 2015
18:30

Vietnam	2–2	Laos
Nguyễn Khắc Khiêm 22', 45'	Report	Bounkong 49'; Nalin 89'

Olympic Stadium, Phnom Penh
Referee: Vichhika Tuy (Cambodia)

1 August 2015
10:00 (Note: The game was initially abandoned on the original match date due to heavy rain and played the following day.)

Thailand	3–0	Timor-Leste
Jinnawat 52', 76'; Korawich 90'	Report

Army Stadium, Phnom Penh
Referee: Thant Zin Oo (Myanmar)

2 August 2015
15:30

Vietnam	0–2	Thailand
	Report	Ngô Kim Long 49' (o.g.); Santipap 85'

Olympic Stadium, Phnom Penh
Referee: Clifford Daypuyat (Philippines)
2 August 2015
18:30

Timor-Leste	3–1	Malaysia
João Pedro 45'; Danilson Araújo 71', 81'	Report	Alif 79'

Olympic Stadium, Phnom Penh
Referee: Vichhika Tuy (Cambodia)

3 August 2015
10:00

Brunei	0–2	Laos
	Report	Sengsavang 9', 86'

Army Stadium, Phnom Penh
Referee: Khin Maung Win (Myanmar)

4 August 2015
15:30

Malaysia	0–2	Laos
	Report	Thatsaphone Saysouk 19'; Bounphachan Bounkong 21'

Olympic Stadium, Phnom Penh
Referee: Thant Zin Oo (Myanmar)
4 August 2015
15:30

Thailand	2–0	Brunei
Hassawat 82'; Jinnawat 84'	Report

Army Stadium, Phnom Penh
Referee: Lim Bunthoeun (Cambodia)
4 August 2015
18:30

Vietnam	2–2	Timor-Leste
Lê Ngọc Thái 49'; Trần Văn Đạt 89'	Report	Yafet Barros 34'; Armindo Gusmao 76'

Olympic Stadium, Phnom Penh
Referee: Lim Bunthoeun (Cambodia)

=== Group B ===
Pos	Team	Pld	W	D	L	GF	GA	GD	Pts	Qualification
1	Australia	4	4	0	0	24	4	+20	12	Knockout stage
2	Myanmar	4	3	0	1	9	5	+4	9	Knockout stage
3	Singapore	4	1	1	2	7	12	−5	4	
4	Cambodia (H)	4	1	1	2	1	7	−6	4	
5	Philippines	4	0	0	4	3	16	−13	0	

Source: AFF
(H) Hosts
28 July 2015
15:30

Singapore	1–3	Myanmar
Nicolas 34'	Report	Hein Htet Aung 12'; Win Naing Tun 39'; Htet Phyoe Wai 62'

Olympic Stadium, Phnom Penh
Referee: Souei Vongkham (Laos)
28 July 2015
18:30

Philippines	0–1	Cambodia
	Report	Teat Kimheng 55'

Olympic Stadium, Phnom Penh
Referee: Nguyễn Hiền Triệt (Vietnam)

30 July 2015
15:30

Singapore	4–1	Philippines
Hairee 54'; Rezky 75'; Sharul 90'; Firdaus 90+4'	Report	Calunsag 17'

Olympic Stadium, Phnom Penh
Referee: Khin Maung Win (Myanmar)
30 July 2015
18:30

Cambodia	0–4	Australia
	Report	Brook 2', 45+1'; Italiano 31'; Sweedan 90+2'

Olympic Stadium, Phnom Penh
Referee: Souei Vongkham (Laos)

1 August 2015
15:30

Myanmar	3–0	Philippines
Hein Htet Aung 37'; Win Naing Tun 44'; Kyaw Kyaw Htet 84'	Report

Olympic Stadium, Phnom Penh
Referee: Nguyễn Hiền Triệt (Vietnam)
1 August 2015
18:30

Australia	8–2	Singapore
Najjarine 22'; Moric 23', 42', 70', 87'; Pierias 54', 90+2'; Akbari 77'	Report	Rezky 18'; Kweh 64'

Olympic Stadium, Phnom Penh
Referee: Lim Bunthoeun (Cambodia)

3 August 2015
15:30

Australia	4–0	Myanmar
Najjarine 7'; Brook 16'; Valenti 19'; Moric 90+3'	Report

Olympic Stadium, Phnom Penh
Referee: Nguyễn Hiền Triệt (Vietnam)
3 August 2015
18:30

Cambodia	0–0	Singapore
	Report

Olympic Stadium, Phnom Penh
Referee: Souei Vongkham (Laos)

5 August 2015
15:30

Australia	8–2	Philippines
Roberts 5', 22', 28', 44'; Ryan 31'; Castaneda 70'; Moric 79'; Brook 87'	Report	Wilson 14'; Tacardon 24'

Olympic Stadium, Phnom Penh
Referee: Mohammad Hasrin Haji Samat (Brunei)
5 August 2015
18:30

Myanmar	3–0	Cambodia
Pyae Sone Naing 16'; Win Naing Tun 20'; Aung Chit Oo Ko Ko 55'	Report

Olympic Stadium, Phnom Penh
Referee: Clifford Daypuyat (Philippines)

== Knockout stage ==
In the knockout stage, penalty shoot-out is used to decide the winner if necessary (extra time is not used).

=== Bracket ===
Semi-finals
7 August – Phnom Penh
Laos	0
Myanmar	1
7 August – Phnom Penh
Australia	2
Thailand	3

Final
9 August – Phnom Penh
Myanmar	0
Thailand	3
Third place match
9 August – Phnom Penh
Laos	2
Australia	10

=== Semi-finals ===
7 August 2015
15:30

Laos	0−1	Myanmar
	Report	Pyae Sone Naing 32'

Olympic Stadium, Phnom Penh
Referee: Nguyễn Hiền Triệt (Vietnam)

7 August 2015
18:30

Australia	2−3	Thailand
Roberts 73' (pen.); Pierias 78'	Report	Jinnawat 48'; Hassawat 52'; Korawich 70'

Olympic Stadium, Phnom Penh
Referee: Thant Zin Oo (Myanmar)

=== Third place match ===
9 August 2015
15:30

Laos	2−10	Australia
Sengsavang 41', 44'	Report	Roberts 16' (pen.), 55', 78'; Brook 22'; Sweedan 43'; Akbari 45+2', 79', 90+2'; Moric 70', 80'

Olympic Stadium, Phnom Penh
Referee: Clifford Daypuyat (Philippines)

=== Final ===
9 August 2015
18:30

Myanmar	0−3	Thailand
	Report	Sittirak 41'; Natthapong 81'; Jinnawat 82'

Olympic Stadium, Phnom Penh
Referee: Vichhika Tuy (Cambodia)

== Winners ==
2015 AFF U-16 Youth Championship winners

Thailand
Third title

== Awards ==
The following awards were given at the conclusion of the tournament:

Top Goalscorer
(Australia) Marc Moric
(Australia) John Roberts

== Final ranking ==
As per statistical convention in football, matches decided in extra time are counted as wins and losses, while matches decided by penalty shoot-outs are counted as draws.

Pos	Team	Pld	W	D	L	GF	GA	GD	Pts	Final result
1	Thailand	7	6	0	1	16	4	+12	18	Champions
2	Myanmar	6	4	0	2	10	8	+2	12	Runners-up
3	Australia	6	5	0	1	36	9	+27	15	Third place
4	Laos	7	4	1	2	12	15	−3	13	Fourth place
5	Malaysia	5	2	0	3	4	8	−4	6	Eliminated in Group stage
6	Vietnam	5	1	2	2	10	8	+2	5	Eliminated in Group stage
7	Timor-Leste	5	1	2	2	9	11	−2	5	Eliminated in Group stage
8	Singapore	4	1	1	2	7	12	−5	4	Eliminated in Group stage
9	Cambodia (H)	4	1	1	2	1	7	−6	4	Eliminated in Group stage
10	Brunei	5	0	1	4	3	13	−10	1	Eliminated in Group stage
11	Philippines	4	0	0	4	3	16	−13	0	Eliminated in Group stage

(H) Hosts

== Goalscorers ==
8 goals

- (Australia) Marc Moric
- (Australia) John Roberts

7 goals

- (Thailand) Jinnawat Russamee

5 goals

- (Australia) Lachlan Brook
- (Laos) Bounphachan Bounkong

4 goals

- (Australia) Rahmat Akbari
- (Laos) Xayyaphon Sengsavang

3 goals

- (Australia) Dylan Pierias
- (Myanmar) Win Naing Tun
- (Thailand) Korrawit Tasa
- (Vietnam) Trần Văn Đạt

2 goals

- (Australia) Ramy Najjarine
- (Australia) Ahmed Sweedan
- (Brunei) Mohammad Hanif Adanan
- (Laos) Nalin
- (Myanmar) Hein Htet Aung
- (Myanmar) Pyae Sone Naing
- (Singapore) Rezza Rezky Ramadhani
- (Thailand) Hassawat Nopnate
- (Timor-Leste) Armindo Gusmao
- (Timor-Leste) Danilson Araujo
- (Timor-Leste) Filomeno Costa
- (Vietnam) Nguyễn Hồng Sơn
- (Vietnam) Nguyễn Khắc Khiêm

1 goal

- (Australia) Eduardo Castaneda
- (Australia) Jacob Italiano
- (Australia) Dylan Ryan
- (Australia) Adrian Valenti
- (Brunei) Abdul Hariz Herman
- (Cambodia) Teat Kimheng
- (Laos) Thatsaphone Saysouk
- (Malaysia) Ariq Shaqirin Suhaimi
- (Malaysia) Muhammad Alif Safwan
- (Malaysia) Muhammad Nizarruddin Jazi
- (Myanmar) Aung Chit Oo Ko Ko
- (Myanmar) Htet Phyoe Wai
- (Myanmar) Kyaw Kyaw Htet
- (Philippines) Fidel Victor Tacardon
- (Philippines) Joseph Sherwyn Calunsag
- (Philippines) Robert Lawrence Wilson
- (Singapore) Glenn Kweh Jia Jin
- (Singapore) Hidayatul Firdaus Johan
- (Singapore) Jordan Nicolas Vestering
- (Singapore) Khairul Hairee Abdul Hamid
- (Singapore) Muhammad Sharul Shah
- (Thailand) Natthapong Nakpitak
- (Thailand) Santipap Yaemsaen
- (Thailand) Sittirak Koetkhumthong
- (Timor-Leste) Dom Braz
- (Timor-Leste) Joao Frtas
- (Timor-Leste) Yafet Barros
- (Vietnam) Bùi Anh Đức
- (Vietnam) Lê Ngọc Thái
- (Vietnam) Nguyễn Hữu Thắng

Own goals

- (Vietnam) Ngô Kim Long (playing against Thailand)
- (Vietnam) Nguyễn Xuân Kiên (playing against Malaysia)
