= 2015 China-ASEAN International Youth Football Tournament =

Tournament details
- Host country: China
- Dates: 4 March – 11 March
- Teams: 4 (from 1 confederation)
- Venue: 1 (in 1 host city)

Final positions
- Champions: Malaysia
- Runners-up: Vietnam
- Third place: Myanmar
- Fourth place: China

Tournament statistics
- Matches played: 8
- Goals scored: 12 (1.5 per match)

The 2015 China-ASEAN International Youth Football Tournament was the first edition of the China-ASEAN International Youth Football Tournament. The competition began on 4 March and ended on 11 March 2015.

== Participants ==
- China
- Malaysia
- Myanmar
- Vietnam

== Group stage ==
Team	Pld	W	D	L	GF	GA	GD	Pts
1. Vietnam	3	2	1	0	4	2	+2	7
2. Malaysia	3	1	1	1	1	1	0	4
2. China PR	3	1	0	2	2	3	−1	3
4. Myanmar	3	1	0	2	2	3	−1	3

4 March 2015

Myanmar	1–2	Vietnam

Dongxing Sports Center, Guangxi
4 March 2015

China	1–0	Malaysia

Dongxing Sports Center, Guangxi
6 March 2015

Myanmar	0–1	Malaysia

Dongxing Sports Center, Guangxi
6 March 2015

China	1–2	Vietnam

Dongxing Sports Center, Guangxi
8 March 2015

Malaysia	0–0	Vietnam

Dongxing Sports Center, Guangxi
8 March 2015

China	0–1	Myanmar

Dongxing Sports Center, Guangxi

== Knockout stage ==
=== Third place ===
11 March 2015

China	0–1	Myanmar

Dongxing Sports Center, Guangxi

=== Final ===
11 March 2015

Vietnam	0–2	Malaysia

Dongxing Sports Center, Guangxi
