= China-ASEAN International Youth Football Tournament =

International youth football tournament in China

The China-ASEAN International Youth Football Tournament is an international youth football tournament held annually in Guangxi, China.

== Winners ==
Year	Teams	Winners	Score	Runners-up	Third	Score	Fourth
2015	4	Malaysia	2–0	Vietnam	Myanmar	1–0	China
2016	4						

=== Performances by countries ===
Team	Titles	Runners-up
Malaysia	1 (2015)	
Vietnam		1 (2015)
