= Noel Marcaida =

Filipino association football coach and former player

Personal information
- Full name: Noel Surigao Marcaida
- Date of birth: December 14, 1980 (age 45)
- Place of birth: Masbate, Philippines
- Position: Goalkeeper

Team information
- Current team: Loyola (technical director)

International career
Years	Team	Apps	(Gls)
c. 1999	Philippines		

Managerial career
- 2013–2014: Pachanga Diliman
- c. 2014: Philippines U21 (goalkeeping)
- c. 2015: Philippines U19 (goalkeeping)
- 2016: Philippines U19
- 2016–2017: Kaya–Iloilo (assistant)
- 2017–2019: Kaya–Iloilo
- 2020–: Loyola (technical director)
- 2021–: Philippines U23 (goalkeeping)

Noel Surigao Marcaida (born December 14, 1980) is a Filipino football coach and former player. He is currently the technical director of Loyola.

Marcaida was a goalkeeper of the Philippines national team in the 1999 Southeast Asian Games and the 2000 Olympic Qualifiers.

As a head coach, he led Pachanga Diliman to the final of the 2013 UFL Cup. He then coached Kaya–Iloilo from 2017 to 2019, where they won the Copa Paulino Alcantara and achieved two second-place finishes in the league. He has also served in the coaching staff of the Philippines' national youth teams.

== Career ==
=== As coach ===
==== Pachanga Diliman ====
Noel Marcaida coached Pachanga Diliman of the United Football League (UFL) and guided the club to the 2013 UFL Cup final, where they lost to Loyola.

==== Philippines youth teams ====
In February 2014, he was appointed as the goalkeeping coach of the Philippines under-21 team for that year's Hassanal Bolkiah Trophy. He was also goalkeeping coach for the Philippines under-19 team in the 2015 AFF U-19 Youth Championship and the 2016 AFC U-19 Championship qualification, both held in Laos. In February 2016, he was the head coach of Philippines U-19 during the 2016 China-ASEAN International Youth Football Tournament held in China.

==== Kaya ====
Marcaida joined Kaya in July 2016 as a goalkeeping coach and assistant to Chris Greatwich. After Greatwich's departure in 2017, Marcaida became the team's head coach. He led the club to win the inaugural Copa Paulino Alcantara in 2018 as well as guiding the team to its runner-up finish in both 2018 and 2019 Philippines Football League seasons. Kaya also participated in the 2019 AFC Cup. He announced his departure from the club in January 2020 after his contract expired on December 31, 2019.

=== As technical director ===
As of February 2020, he is the technical director of Loyola. As of 2020, he is also serving as the academy director of GKMarks Academy, a football academy specializing in goalkeeping.

== Personal life ==
Mark Jojo Marcaida, Noel's first cousin once removed who is partially deaf and mute, played as a forward for the National University football team. Noel's involvement in football inspired Mark to take up the sport.

== Honors ==
=== Coach ===
Pachanga Diliman

- United Football League Cup runner-up: 2013

Kaya–Iloilo

- Copa Paulino Alcantara: 2018; runner-up: 2019
