= Đậu Quang Hưng =

Vietnamese footballer

Personal information
- Full name: Đậu Quang Hưng
- Date of birth: 28 May 2009 (age 17)
- Place of birth: Nghi Xuân, Hà Tĩnh, Vietnam
- Height: 1.65 m (5 ft 5 in)
- Position: Forward

Team information
- Current team: Hồ Chí Minh City
- Number: 21

Youth career
- 2017–2018: Sông Lam Nghệ An
- 2018–2026: BMG Academy
- 2020: → Sông Lam Nghệ An (loan)

Senior career*
Years	Team	Apps	(Gls)
2026–	Hồ Chí Minh City	2	(0)

International career^{‡}
2026–	Vietnam U17	4	(1)
- * Club domestic league appearances and goals as of 26 September 2026 ‡ National team caps and goals as of 15 May 2026

Đậu Quang Hưng (born 28 June 2009) is a Vietnamese professional footballer who plays as a forward for V.League 2 club Hồ Chí Minh City.

== Club career ==
Quang Hưng joined the Sông Lam Nghệ An youth academy in 2017. After one year at the club, he participated in the Juventus Academy Vietnam (later became BMG Academy) trial and was admitted there.

On 18 September 2026, Quang Hưng made his professional debut for Hồ Chí Minh City, starting in the first game of the 2026–27 V.League 2 against Quy Nhơn United.

== International career ==
In April 2026, Quang Hưng was part of the Vietnam U17 squad that won the 2026 ASEAN U-17 Boys' Championship. Later in the year, at the AFC U-17 Asian Cup, Quang Hưng scored the winning goal in the first group stage match against Yemen. This goal contributed significantly to Vietnam's qualification to the 2026 FIFA U-17 World Cup.
