= Santipap Yaemsaen =

Thai footballer (born 2000)

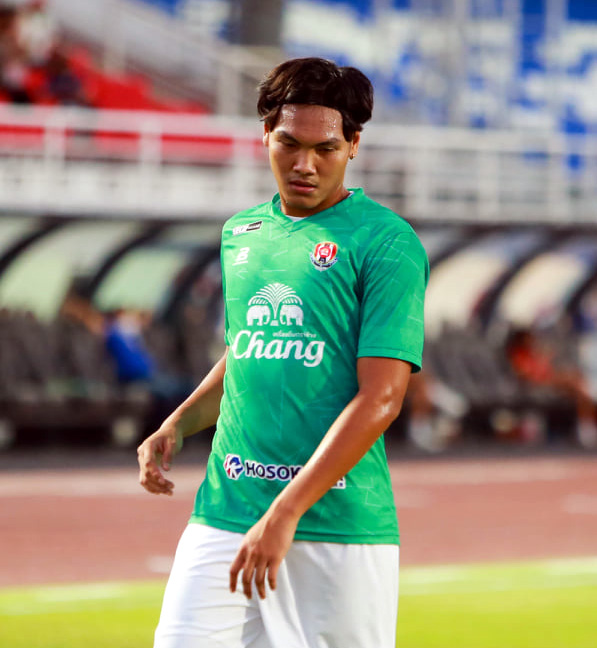
- Navy FC, 2022

Personal information
- Full name: Santipap Yaemsaen
- Date of birth: 1 March 2000 (age 26)
- Place of birth: Bangkok, Thailand
- Height: 1.87 m (6 ft 1 1/2 in)
- Position: Centre back

Team information
- Current team: Chiangrai United
- Number: 15

Youth career
- 2014–2020: Bangkok United

Senior career*
Years	Team	Apps	(Gls)
2020–2023	Bangkok United	1	(0)
2020–2021	→ Krabi (loan)	16	(1)
2022	→ Navy (loan)	14	(0)
2022	→ Krabi (loan)	11	(0)
2023	→ Chainat Hornbill (loan)	17	(1)
2023–	Chiangrai United	23	(1)

International career^{‡}
2015–2016	Thailand U16	10	(1)
2018	Thailand U19	1	(0)
- * Club domestic league appearances and goals as of 9 January 2026 ‡ National team caps and goals as of 9 June 2022 (UTC)

Santipap Yaemsaen (Thai: สันติภาพ แย้มแสน, born 1 March 2000) is a Thai professional footballer who plays as a centre back for Thai League 1 club Chiangrai United.

== International Goals ==
=== Under-16 ===
Santipap Yaemsaen – goals for Thailand U16
#	Date	Venue	Opponent	Score	Result	Competition
1.	2 August 2015	Phnom Penh, Cambodia	Vietnam	2–0	2–0	2015 AFF U-16 Youth Championship
