= Jariyah Shah =

Australian soccer player (born 2009)

Personal information
- Full name: Jariyah Zain Shah
- Date of birth: 25 May 2009 (age 17)
- Place of birth: Canberra, Australia
- Positions: Midfielder; right-back

Team information
- Current team: Manchester United
- Number: 83

Youth career
- Doncaster Rovers
- 2022–: Manchester United

International career^{‡}
Years	Team	Apps	(Gls)
2025–	Australia U17	5	(1)
- ‡ National team caps and goals as of 20 November 2026

Jariyah Zain Shah (born 25 May 2009) is an Australian soccer player who plays as a midfielder for English Premier League club Manchester United's youth team and the Australia under-17 national team.

== Early life ==
Shah was born in Canberra, Australia to a Pakistani father and Vietnamese mother. He moved to England as a child, and also holds British citizenship. His father, Tak Shah, played semi-professional football in England for Armthorpe Welfare.

== Club career ==
After moving to England, Shah joined the academy of Doncaster Rovers. However, in April 2022 he moved to Manchester United alongside teammate Neithan Barbosa, with the club reportedly paying a six-figure fee for both players as well as Zac Watson, who joined in September of the same year. He signed scholarship terms in July 2025, having made his under-18 debut in February against Wolverhampton Wanderers. He scored his first goal for the under-18 side against Everton on 20 December 2025.

== International career ==
Shah is eligible to represent Australia, England, Pakistan and Vietnam at international level. In December 2023, he was called up to the England under-15 squad for a training camp.

He was called up to the Australia under-17 squad in November 2025 ahead of 2026 AFC U-17 Asian Cup qualification fixtures. He scored in Australia's 4–0 win against the Philippines on 28 November 2025.

Shah was selected in the final Australian squad to compete in the 2026 FIFA U-17 World Cup.
