= 2026 CFA Team China U-16 Cup =

2026 CFA Team China U-16
2026CFA中国之队·“和平杯”沈阳国际青年足球锦标赛

Tournament details
- Host country: China
- City: Shenyang
- Dates: 24–27 September
- Teams: 4 (from 3 sub-confederations)
- Venue: 1

Final positions
- Champions: Australia (1st title)
- Runners-up: Kyrgyzstan
- Third place: China
- Fourth place: Vietnam

Tournament statistics
- Matches played: 6
- Goals scored: 21 (3.5 per match)
- Top scorer: (Australia) Zachary Harrison (3 goals)

The 2026 CFA Team China U-16 (Chinese: 2026CFA中国之队·“和平杯”沈阳国际青年足球锦标赛), also known as the 2026 CFA Team China U-16 – Peace Cup (Chinese: 2026CFA中国之队·和平杯) was the third edition of the under-16 CFA Cup organised by Chinese Football Association (CFA), an invitational under-16 football tournament held in Shenyang, Liaoning province, China from 24 to 30 September 2026. It was a part of the overall 2026 Shenyang Peace Cup for youth football teams.

== Format ==
The four invited teams played a single round-robin tournament.

== Venue ==
Shenyang
Shenhe District Cultural and Sports Center Stadium
Capacity: 12,800

== Teams ==
Team	Sub-confederation
China (host)	EAFF
Kyrgyzstan	CAFA
Vietnam	AFF
Australia	AFF

== Standings ==
Pos	Team	Pld	W	D	L	GF	GA	GD	Pts	
1	Australia (C)	3	2	1	0	7	4	+3	7	Champions
2	Kyrgyzstan	3	1	2	0	8	5	+3	5	Runners-up
3	China (H)	3	1	1	1	4	4	0	4	Third place
4	Vietnam	3	0	0	3	2	8	−6	0	Fourth place

Source: CFA
Rules for classification: 1) points; 2) goal difference; 3) goals scored; 4) head-to-head points; 5) head-to-head goal difference; 6) head-to-head number of goals scored; 7) Disciplinary points (yellow card = 1 point, red card as a result of two yellow cards = 3 points, direct red card = 3 points, yellow card followed by direct red card = 4 points).
(C) Champions; (H) Hosts

== Results ==
All match times are in local time, (UTC+8).

24 September 2026
14:00

Australia	4–2	Vietnam
Harrison 28', 56'; Hooper 66' (pen.); Vương Đình Minh Quang 34' (o.g.)	Report	Nguyễn Văn Cảnh 21'; Nguyễn Minh Nhật 71'

Shenhe District Cultural and Sports Center Stadium, Shenyang
24 September 2026
19:35

China	3–3	Kyrgyzstan
Zhang Shuhang 5'; Li Yuxuan 52'; Wu Bile 74'	Report	Alimzhanov 13'; Khodjaev 78'; Arynov 85'

Shenhe District Cultural and Sports Center Stadium, Shenyang
Attendance: 2,369
Referee: Qiu Zhaojun (China)

27 September 2026
14:00

China	1–0	Vietnam
Ji Zhenghao 68'	Report

Shenhe District Cultural and Sports Center Stadium, Shenyang
Attendance: 2,180
Referee: Dai Yige (China)
30 September 2026
19:35

Kyrgyzstan	2–2	Australia
44'; 90'	Report	Hogan 71'; Dunne 71'

Shenhe District Cultural and Sports Center Stadium, Shenyang

30 September 2026
14:00

Vietnam	0–3	Kyrgyzstan
	Report	21'

Shenhe District Cultural and Sports Center Stadium, Shenyang
30 September 2026
19:35

China	0–1	Australia
	Report	Harrison 13'

Shenhe District Cultural and Sports Center Stadium, Shenyang
Attendance: 3,652
Referee: Ren Tong (China)

== Top scorers ==
Rank	Player	Goals
1	(Australia) Zachary Harrison	3
2	(Vietnam) Nguyễn Văn Cảnh	1
2	(Vietnam) Nguyễn Minh Nhật	1
2	(Australia) Noah Hooper	1
2	(China) Zhang Shuhang	1
2	(China) Li Yuxuan	1
2	(China) Wu Bile	1
2	(Kyrgyzstan) Salavat Alimzhanov	1
2	(Kyrgyzstan) Azizkhan Khodjaev	1
2	(Kyrgyzstan) Alikhan Arynov	1
2	(Australia) Tyler Hogan	1
2	(Australia) Eddie Dunne	1
2	(China) Ji Zhenghao	1
