= 2009 AFF U-16 Youth Championship =

AFF U-16 Youth Championship Thailand 2009

Tournament details
- Host country: Thailand
- City: Bangkok
- Dates: 6–19 August (Canceled)
- Teams: 10 (from 1 confederation)
- Venue: 1 (in 1 host city)

The 2009 AFF U-16 Youth Championship was due to take place in Bangkok, Thailand between the 20 July and 2 August 2009, it was later moved to start on 6 August until 19 August but was eventually cancelled one month prior to the opening day due to the H1N1 virus in the country.

== Participant teams ==
- Australia
- Brunei
- Indonesia
- Laos
- Malaysia
- Myanmar
- Philippines
- Singapore
- Thailand
- Vietnam

Did not enter:

- Cambodia
- Timor Leste

== Venues ==
Bangkok
Rajamangala Stadium
Capacity: 49,722
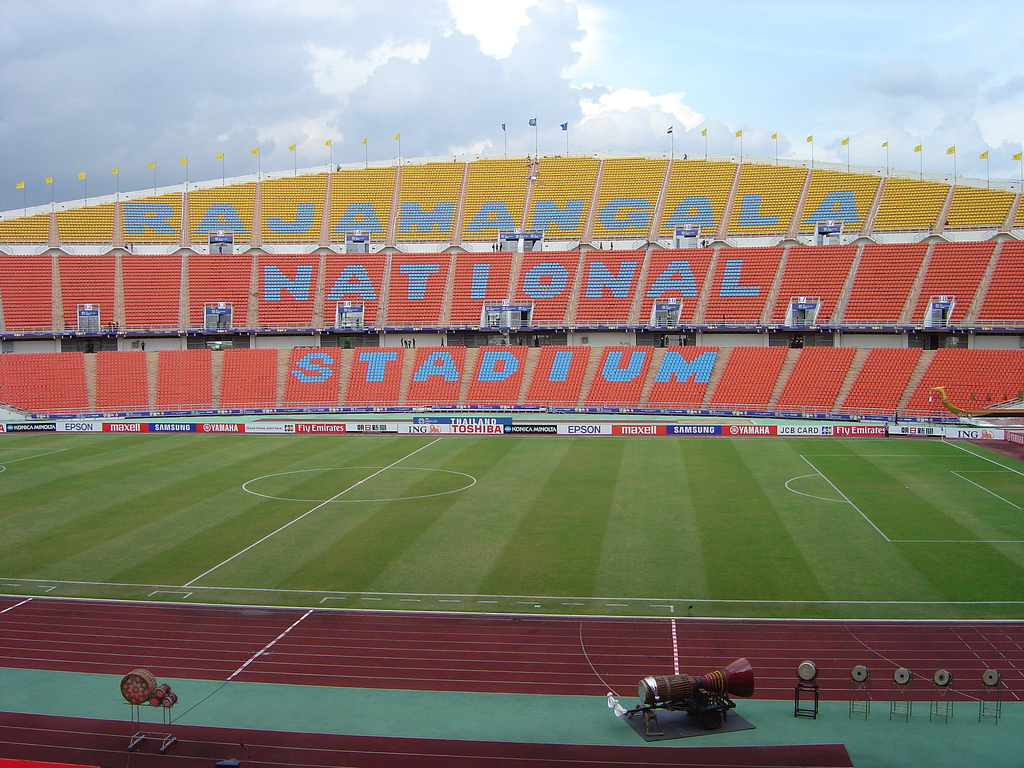

== Tournament ==
=== Group stage ===
==== Group A ====
Team	Pld	W	D	L	GF	GA	GD	Pts
Singapore	–							
Myanmar	–							
Australia	–							
Vietnam	–							
Brunei	–							

6 August 2009
14:00

Australia	–	Myanmar

Rajamangala Stadium
6 August 2009
16:30

Brunei	–	Vietnam

Rajamangala Stadium

8 August 2009
14:00

Vietnam	–	Singapore

Rajamangala Stadium
8 August 2009
16:30

Brunei	–	Australia

Rajamangala Stadium

10 August 2009
14:00

Singapore	–	Brunei

Rajamangala Stadium
10 August 2009
16:30

Myanmar	–	Vietnam

Rajamangala Stadium

12 August 2009
14:00

Brunei	–	Myanmar

Rajamangala Stadium
12 August 2009
16:30

Australia	–	Singapore

Rajamangala Stadium

14 August 2009
14:00

Vietnam	–	Australia

Rajamangala Stadium
14 August 2009
16:30

Myanmar	–	Singapore

Rajamangala Stadium

==== Group B ====
Team	Pld	W	D	L	GF	GA	GD	Pts
Thailand	–							
Indonesia	–							
Malaysia	–							
Laos	–							
Philippines	–							

7 August 2009
14:00

Indonesia	–	Malaysia

Rajamangala Stadium
7 August 2009
16:30

Philippines	–	Laos

Rajamangala Stadium

9 August 2009
14:00

Laos	–	Thailand

Rajamangala Stadium
9 August 2009
16:30

Philippines	–	Indonesia

Rajamangala Stadium

11 August 2009
14:00

Thailand	–	Philippines

Rajamangala Stadium
11 August 2009
16:30

Malaysia	–	Laos

Rajamangala Stadium

13 August 2009
14:00

Philippines	–	Malaysia

Rajamangala Stadium
13 August 2009
16:30

Indonesia	–	Thailand

Rajamangala Stadium

15 August 2009
14:00

Laos	–	Indonesia

Rajamangala Stadium
15 August 2009
16:30

Malaysia	–	Thailand

Rajamangala Stadium

=== Knockout stage ===
==== Semi-final ====
17 August 2009
14:00

Winner Group A	–	Runner-up Group B

Rajamangala Stadium

17 August 2009
16:30

Winner Group B	–	Runner-up Group A

Rajamangala Stadium

==== Third place play-off ====
19 August 2009
14:00

Lose semi-final 1	–	Loser semi-final 2

Rajamangala Stadium

==== Final ====
19 August 2009
16:30

Winner semi-final 1	–	Winner semi-final 2

Rajamangala Stadium
