= Liang Yu (footballer) =

Chinese footballer

Liang Yu 梁雨
Personal information
- Date of birth: April 20, 1994 (age 32)
- Place of birth: Tianjin, China
- Height: 1.80 m (5 ft 11 in)
- Position: Midfielder

Senior career*
Years	Team	Apps	(Gls)
2013–2015	Shanghai Shenhua	3	(0)
2015–2016	Henan Jianye	17	(0)
2017–2019	Shenzhen FC	1	(0)
- * Club domestic league appearances and goals as of 31 December 2019

Liang Yu (Chinese: 梁雨; born 20 April 1994 in Tianjin) is a Chinese professional football player as a midfielder.

== Club career ==
In 2013, Liang Yu started his professional footballer career with Shanghai Shenhua in the Chinese Super League. He would eventually make his league debut for Shanghai Shenhua on 26 June 2013 in a game against Changchun Yatai, coming on as a substitute for Bai Jiajun in the 85th minute.

On 10 July 2015, Liang transferred to fellow Chinese Super League side Henan Jianye.

== Club career statistics ==
Statistics accurate as of match played 31 December 2019.

Appearances and goals by club, season and competition
Club	Season	League			National Cup		Continental		Other		Total	
Club	Season	Division	Apps	Goals	Apps	Goals	Apps	Goals	Apps	Goals	Apps	Goals
Shanghai Shenhua	2013	Chinese Super League	2	0	0	0	-		-		2	0
Shanghai Shenhua	2014	Chinese Super League	1	0	0	0	-		-		1	0
Shanghai Shenhua	2015	Chinese Super League	0	0	0	0	-		-		0	0
Shanghai Shenhua	Total		3	0	0	0	0	0	0	0	3	0
Henan Jianye	2015	Chinese Super League	7	0	1	0	-		-		8	0
Henan Jianye	2016	Chinese Super League	10	0	2	1	-		-		12	1
Henan Jianye	Total		17	0	3	1	0	0	0	0	20	1
Shenzhen FC	2017	China League One	0	0	0	0	-		-		0	0
Shenzhen FC	2018	China League One	1	0	1	0	-		-		2	0
Shenzhen FC	Total		1	0	1	0	0	0	0	0	2	0
Career total			21	0	4	1	0	0	0	0	25	1
