= 2016 China-ASEAN International Youth Football Tournament =

Tournament details
- Host country: China
- Dates: 21 February – 25 February
- Teams: 4 (from 2 confederations)
- Venue: 1 (in 1 host city)

The 2016 China-ASEAN International Youth Football Tournament was the second edition of the China-ASEAN International Youth Football Tournament. The competition began on 21 February and ended on 25 February 2016.

== Participants ==
- China
- Croatia
- Philippines
- Uzbekistan
