= Laos national under-17 football team =

National association football team

Laos Under-17
- Association: Lao Football Federation
- Confederation: AFC (Asia)
- Sub-confederation: AFF (Southeast Asia)
- Head coach: (Thailand) Suphachai Klangkrasea
- Home stadium: New Laos National Stadium
- FIFA code: LAO
First colours	Second colours

First international
- Laos 0–5 Myanmar (Yangon, Myanmar; 25 May 1998)

Biggest win
- Laos 22–0 Guam (Yangon, Myanmar; 10 June 2000)

Biggest defeat
- Laos 1–11 South Korea (Seoul, South Korea; 15 April 2002)

AFC U-17 Asian Cup
- Appearances: 3 (first in 2004)
- Best result: Group stage (2004, 2012, 2023)

ASEAN U-16 Boys' Championship
- Appearances: 10 (first in 2002)
- Best result: Second place (2002, 2007, 2011)

The Laos national U-17 association football team is the association football team controlled by the Lao Football Federation.

== Roster ==
Position	Name
Team manager	(Laos) Khampheng Vongkhanty
Head coach	(Thailand) Suphachai Klangkrasea
Assistant coach	(Laos) Khola Oundala
Assistant coach	(Laos) Phonethip Sengmany
Assistant coach	(Laos) Sonevilay Sihavong
Goalkeeper coach	(Laos) Sengphet Vongxayyalath
Health/medical officer	(Laos) Sengchan Sibounheung (Laos) Kheuavanh Mengvilay
Team doctor	(Laos) Banchong Jinda
Kit manager	(Laos) Chanthaboun Muensee
Media Officer	(Laos) Sonexay Latsath

== Current Squad ==
The following 23 players were selected for the 2026 AFC U-17 Asian Cup qualification.

No.	Pos.	Player	Date of birth (age)	Club
1	GK	Sankham Thavithong	14 September 2010 (age 16)	(Lao Football Federation) Horng Lor Kanxay FC
13	GK	Xayaphet Phouttasy		(Lao Football Federation) Ezra
18	GK	Chakkalin Xayyasone		(Lao Football Federation) Ezra
3	DF	Vetsavanh Vilayphanh		(Lao Football Federation) Champi-Champa
8	DF	Thanyavouth Xaychaleun	1 January 2009 (age 17)	(Lao Football Federation) Ezra
16	DF	Visaithat Nanthavong	22 March 2009 (age 17)	(Lao Football Federation) Ezra
22	DF	Yanavout Mouyphachan		(Lao Football Federation) Champi-Champa
23	DF	Keokaysone Xayyasan		(Lao Football Federation) Ezra
5	DF	Bounthasak Chandala	26 November 2009 (age 16)	(Lao Football Federation) Young Elephants
12	DF	Anoulack Singsavang	21 September 2009 (age 17)	(Lao Football Federation) Salavan United
2	DF	Ki Mounkunya	18 November 2009 (age 16)	(Lao Football Federation) Mazda GB
9	MF	Anousith Phadit	9 September 2009 (age 17)	(Lao Football Federation) Mazda GB
4	MF	Palindeth Phettakounh	21 November 2009 (age 16)	(Lao Football Federation) BIS Master
6	MF	Bounpaseut Sengsavang	2 June 2009 (age 17)	(Lao Football Federation) Savannakhet
19	MF	Savansay Mounlatxavong	18 May 2009 (age 17)	(Lao Football Federation) Savannakhet
20	MF	Atiya Inthavong		(Lao Football Federation) Ezra
21	MF	Phongsavanh Bandakone	4 October 2009 (age 17)	(Lao Football Federation) TB Bokeo
7	FW	Sitthilath Chanthamaly	10 May 2010 (age 16)	(Lao Football Federation) Luang Prabang
10	FW	Odin Siphanit (captain)	7 August 2009 (age 17)	(Lao Football Federation) Mazda GB
11	FW	Phoutphatai Chanthalangsy	20 June 2009 (age 17)	(Lao Football Federation) Young Elephants
14	FW	Xaiyasid Kheuabphaphone		(Lao Football Federation) Ezra
15	FW	Sisombat Vilaysone		(Lao Football Federation) Champi-Champa
16	FW	Phommasone Niravong	18 August 2009 (age 17)	(Lao Football Federation) BIS Master

== Fixtures ==
Win Draw Loss

== Performances ==
=== AFC U-16 Championship ===
- 1985 to 1994 – Did not enter
- 1996 to 2002 – Did not qualify
- 2004 – Group stage
- 2006 – Disqualified
- 2008 to 2010 – Did not qualify
- 2012 – Group stage
- 2014 to 2018 – Did not qualify
- 2023 – Group stage
- 2025 – Did not qualify

=== AFF U-16 Championship ===
Laos has organized the tournament twice, in 2011 and in 2012.

- 2002: second
- 2005: third
- 2006: fourth
- 2007: second
- 2008: did not participate
- 2010: did not participate
- 2011: second
- 2012: third
- 2013: group stage
- 2015: fourth
- 2016: group stage
- 2017: group stage
- 2018: group stage
- 2019: group stage
- 2022: group stage
- 2024: Group Stage
