= Vietnam national under-17 football team =

Vietnam
- Nickname(s): Những chiến binh sao vàng (Golden Star Warriors)
- Association: Vietnam Football Federation (VFF)
- Confederation: AFC (Asia)
- Sub-confederation: AFF (Southeast Asia)
- Head coach: Cristiano Roland (U-17); Hoàng Anh Tuấn (U-16, interim)
- Captain: Nguyễn Huỳnh Đăng Khoa
- Home stadium: Various
- FIFA code: VIE
First colours	Second colours

First international
- Vietnam 0–2 Japan (Danang, Vietnam; 3 September 2000)

Biggest win
- Vietnam 18–0 Guam (Hanoi, Vietnam; 18 September 2015)

Biggest defeat
- Japan 7–0 Vietnam (Bambolim, India; 16 September 2016)

FIFA U-17 World Cup
- Appearances: 1 (first in 2026)

AFC U-17 Asian Cup
- Appearances: 11 (first in 2000)
- Best result: Fourth place (2000)

ASEAN U-17 Boys' Championship
- Appearances: 15 (first in 2002)
- Best result: (gold) Champions (2006, 2010, 2017, 2026)

The Vietnam national under-17 football team (Vietnamese: Đội tuyển quốc gia U17 Việt Nam), also known as National U-16–U-17 Selection Team (Vietnamese: Đội tuyển U-16–U-17 Quốc gia), represents Vietnam in football at an under-16 and under-17 age level and is controlled by Vietnam Football Federation, the governing body for football in Vietnam. They are currently coached by Cristiano Roland.

== History ==
The Vietnamese under-16 national team made their first international appearance in the 2000 AFC U-16 Championship as hosts. Led by Phạm Văn Quyến and Phan Như Thuật, the team finished as group runners-up in the group stage, and advanced to the semi-finals. There, they were defeated by Iran. In the third-place match to determine AFC's last representative for the 2001 FIFA U-17 World Championship, Vietnam suffered a 2–4 loss against Japan.

Vietnam won their first title in 2006, being crowned champions at the AFF U-17 Championship. They went on to win their second regional title in 2010.

In 2016, Vietnam passed the AFC U-16 Championship group stage for the second time, before being eliminated by Iran in the quarter-finals. A year later, Vietnam won the AFF U-17 Championship for the third time.

Under coach Cristiano Roland, Vietnam won their fourth AFF title in 2026. Later in the year, after finishing first in their group and qualified to the quarter-finals at the 2026 AFC U-17 Asian Cup, Vietnam gained their first ever qualification to the FIFA U-17 World Cup.

== Results and fixtures ==
The following is a list of match results in the last 12 months, as well as any future matches that have been scheduled.

Win Draw Lose

=== U-17 ===
==== 2026 ====
13 April ASEAN U-17 Championship GS	Vietnam	4–0	Malaysia	Gresik, Indonesia
15:30 UTC+7	Lê Sỹ Bách 11', 27'; Nguyễn Văn Dương 38'; Nguyễn Mạnh Cường 56'	Report		Stadium: Gelora Joko Samudro Stadium; Referee: Choi Cheol-jun (South Korea)

16 April ASEAN U-17 Championship GS	Timor-Leste	0–10	Vietnam	Gresik, Indonesia
15:30 UTC+7		Report	Chu Ngọc Nguyễn Lực 6', 32', 85'; Lê Trọng Đại Nhân 20'; Trần Ngọc Sơn 24'; Trần Trí Dũng 61'; Nguyễn Văn Dương 67', 72', 81'; Trương Nguyễn Duy Khang 70'	Stadium: Gelora Joko Samudro Stadium; Referee: Iv Tina (Cambodia)

19 April ASEAN U-17 Championship GS	Indonesia	0–0	Vietnam	Sidoarjo, Indonesia
19:30 UTC+7		Report		Stadium: Gelora Delta Stadium; Referee: Choi Cheol-jun (South Korea)

22 April ASEAN U-17 Championship SF	Vietnam	2–1	Australia	Sidoarjo, Indonesia
19:30 UTC+7	Nguyễn Mạnh Cường 45+5'; Chu Ngọc Nguyễn Lực 61'	Report	Becvinocski 9'	Stadium: Gelora Delta Stadium; Referee: Yusuke Ohashi (Japan)

24 April ASEAN U-17 Championship F	Malaysia	0–3	Vietnam	Sidoarjo, Indonesia
19:30 UTC+7		Report	Đào Quý Vương 11'; Nguyễn Văn Dương 45+4', 54'	Stadium: Gelora Delta Stadium; Referee: Naufal Adya Fairuski (Indonesia)

7 May AFC U-17 Asian Cup GS	Yemen	0–1	Vietnam	Jeddah, Saudi Arabia
20:00 UTC+3		Report	Đậu Quang Hưng 77'	Stadium: King Abdullah Sports City Hall Stadium; Attendance: 312; Referee: Harish Kundu (India)

10 May AFC U-17 Asian Cup GS	Vietnam	1–4	South Korea	Jeddah, Saudi Arabia
19:00 UTC+3	Lê Sỹ Bách 6'	Report	An Sun-hyun 84'; Ian Nam 86'; Ahn Joo-wan 88'; Kim Ji-woo 90+4'	Stadium: King Abdullah Sports City Training Stadium (Pitch C); Attendance: 100; Referee: Du Jianxin (China)

13 May AFC U-17 Asian Cup GS	Vietnam	3–2	United Arab Emirates	Jeddah, Saudi Arabia
20:00 UTC+3	Chu Ngọc Nguyễn Lực 41'; Nguyễn Minh Thủy 48'; Nguyễn Mạnh Cường 69'	Report	Al Mheiri 1'; Mahrous 56'	Stadium: King Abdullah Sports City Hall Stadium; Attendance: 92; Referee: Wiwat Jumpao-on (Thailand)

16 May AFC U-17 Asian Cup QF	Vietnam	0–3	Australia	Jeddah, Saudi Arabia
20:00 UTC+3		Report	O'Carroll 40'; Hassarati 60'; Gerald 75'	Stadium: King Abdullah Sports City Training Stadium (Pitch A); Attendance: 25; Referee: Sultan Al-Hammadi (United Arab Emirates)

27 September U17 Copa España	Australia	Cancelled	Vietnam	Salou, Spain
--:-- UTC+1				Stadium: Mediterranean Sports Hub
Note: Vietnam withdrew from the tournament after the venue was moved from Thailand to Spain

30 September U17 Copa España	Vietnam	Cancelled	Panama	Salou, Spain
--:-- UTC+1				Stadium: Mediterranean Sports Hub
Note: Vietnam withdrew from the tournament after the venue was moved from Thailand to Spain

3 October U17 Copa España	Morocco	Cancelled	Vietnam	Salou, Spain
--:-- UTC+1				Stadium: Mediterranean Sports Hub
Note: Vietnam withdrew from the tournament after the venue was moved from Thailand to Spain

26 October Friendly	South Korea	Cancelled	Vietnam	Incheon, South Korea
--:-- UTC+9

28 October Friendly	South Korea	Cancelled	Vietnam	Incheon, South Korea
--:-- UTC+9

9 November Friendly	Vietnam	2–0	Fiji	Dubai, United Arab Emirates
18:00 UTC+3	Lê Sỹ Bách 23'; Trần Mạnh Quân 24'	Report

14 November Friendly	Vietnam	1–1	Panama	Al Wakrah, Qatar
16:00 UTC+4	Chu Ngọc Nguyễn Lực (pen.)	Report		Stadium: Saoud bin Abdulrahman Stadium

20 November FIFA U-17 World Cup GS	Belgium	3–2	Vietnam	Al Rayyan, Qatar
16:00 UTC+3	Moorthamer 39'; Achahbar 42'; Philips 60'	Report	Lê Sỹ Bách 4'; Chu Ngọc Nguyễn Lực 84'	Stadium: Aspire Zone (pitch 9); Referee: Daiane Muniz (Brazil)

23 November FIFA U-17 World Cup GS	Vietnam	v	New Zealand	Al Rayyan, Qatar
18:30 UTC+3		Report		Stadium: Aspire Zone (pitch 8)

26 November FIFA U-17 World Cup GS	Vietnam	v	Mali	Al Rayyan, Qatar
16:00 UTC+3		Report		Stadium: Aspire Zone (pitch 9)

=== U-16 ===
==== 2026 ====
24 September Peace Cup	Australia	4–2	Vietnam	Shenyang, China
13:00 UTC+8	Harrison 28', 56'; Hooper 66' (pen.); Vương Đình Minh Quang 34' (o.g.)	Report	Nguyễn Văn Cảnh 21'; Nguyễn Minh Nhật 71'	Stadium: Shenhe District Cultural and Sports Center Stadium

27 September Peace Cup	China	1–0	Vietnam	Shenyang, China
13:00 UTC+8	Ji Zhenghao 68'	Report		Stadium: Shenhe District Cultural and Sports Center Stadium; Attendance: 2,180; Referee: Dai Yige (China)

30 September Peace Cup	Vietnam	0–3	Kyrgyzstan	Shenyang, China
13:00 UTC+8		Report	21'	Stadium: Shenhe District Cultural and Sports Center Stadium

December Friendly	Vietnam	v	South Korea
--:--

December Friendly	Vietnam	v	South Korea
--:--

==== 2027 ====
May AFC U-17 Asian Cup GS	Vietnam	v	TBD	Uzbekistan
--:-- UTC+5

May AFC U-17 Asian Cup GS	Vietnam	v	TBD	Uzbekistan
--:-- UTC+5

May AFC U-17 Asian Cup GS	Vietnam	v	TBD	Uzbekistan
--:-- UTC+5

== Players ==
=== U-17 ===
==== Current squad ====
The following 21 players were called up to prepare for the 2026 FIFA U-17 World Cup in November 2026.

No.	Pos.	Player	Date of birth (age)	Club
1	GK	Chu Bá Huấn	26 January 2009 (age 17)	(Vietnam Football Federation) Hà Nội
12	GK	Nguyễn Việt Dũng	12 February 2009 (age 17)	(Vietnam Football Federation) PVF
21	GK	Lý Xuân Hòa	21 July 2009 (age 17)	(Vietnam Football Federation) PVF
2	DF	Nguyễn Khắc Minh Đức	10 July 2009 (age 17)	(Vietnam Football Federation) Hà Nội
3	DF	Nguyễn Mạnh Cường	25 February 2009 (age 17)	(Vietnam Football Federation) Thể Công-Viettel
4	DF	Nguyễn Huỳnh Đăng Khoa (captain)	18 February 2009 (age 17)	(Vietnam Football Federation) PVF
5	DF	Trần Hoàng Việt	22 February 2009 (age 17)	(Vietnam Football Federation) Hà Nội
13	DF	Nguyễn Ngọc Anh Hào	27 November 2009 (age 16)	(Vietnam Football Federation) PVF
14	DF	Quán Thành Công	16 June 2009 (age 17)	(Vietnam Football Federation) Sông Lam Nghệ An
6	MF	Đào Quý Vương	10 September 2009 (age 17)	(Vietnam Football Federation) Hà Nội
7	MF	Nguyễn Hiệp Đại Việt Nam	17 March 2009 (age 17)	(Vietnam Football Federation) Thép Xanh Nam Định
8	MF	Nguyễn Minh Thủy	12 February 2009 (age 17)	(Vietnam Football Federation) Sông Lam Nghệ An
10	MF	Chu Ngọc Nguyễn Lực	28 July 2009 (age 17)	(Vietnam Football Federation) Hà Nội
15	MF	Nguyễn Trọng Phong	13 August 2009 (age 17)	(Vietnam Football Federation) PVF
17	MF	Trương Nguyễn Duy Khang	30 March 2009 (age 17)	(Vietnam Football Federation) PVF
9	FW	Lê Trọng Đại Nhân	8 October 2009 (age 17)	(Vietnam Football Federation) Thể Công-Viettel
11	FW	Nguyễn Văn Dương	6 October 2009 (age 17)	(Vietnam Football Federation) PVF
16	FW	Trần Ngọc Sơn	2 January 2009 (age 17)	(Vietnam Football Federation) Sông Lam Nghệ An
18	FW	Trần Trí Dũng	24 March 2009 (age 17)	(Vietnam Football Federation) Thể Công-Viettel
19	FW	Trần Mạnh Quân	28 June 2010 (age 16)	(Vietnam Football Federation) Hà Nội
20	FW	Lê Sỹ Bách	4 January 2009 (age 17)	(Vietnam Football Federation) PVF

==== Recent call-ups ====
The following players have been called up for the team within the last 12 months and are still available for selection.

Pos.	Player	Date of birth (age)	Caps	Goals	Club	Latest call-up
GK	Nguyễn Thái Sơn	4 February 2009 (age 17)	-	-	(Vietnam) Hà Nội	2026 FIFA U-17 World Cup ^{INJ}
GK	Nguyễn Tuấn Vũ	17 April 2009 (age 17)	-	-	(Vietnam) Thanh Hóa	2026 FIFA U-17 World Cup ^{PRE}
GK	Hồ Lê Nguyên Chương	5 September 2009 (age 17)	-	-	(Vietnam) Hồ Chí Minh City	2026 AFC U-17 Asian Cup ^{PRE}
DF	Lê Nguyên Khánh	1 September 2009 (age 17)	-	-	(Vietnam) Thanh Hóa	2026 FIFA U-17 World Cup ^{PRE}
DF	Phạm Minh Cường	21 September 2009 (age 17)	-	-	(Vietnam) Huế	2026 FIFA U-17 World Cup ^{PRE}
DF	Bùi Trung Hiếu	9 March 2009 (age 17)	-	-	(Vietnam) PVF	2026 FIFA U-17 World Cup ^{PRE}
DF	Phùng Quang Danh	29 September 2009 (age 17)	-	-	(Vietnam) Thể Công-Viettel	2026 FIFA U-17 World Cup ^{PRE}
DF	Trần Xuân Toàn		-	-	(Vietnam) Công An Hà Nội	2026 FIFA U-17 World Cup ^{PRE}
DF	Vũ Đức Duy		-	-	(Vietnam) Công An Hà Nội	2026 ASEAN U-17 Boys' Championship ^{PRE}
MF	Triệu Đình Vỹ	10 November 2009 (age 17)	-	-	(Vietnam) Thể Công-Viettel	2026 AFC U-17 Asian Cup
FW	Tạ Đình Phong		-	-	(Vietnam) SHB Đà Nẵng	2026 FIFA U-17 World Cup ^{PRE}
FW	Đậu Quang Hưng	28 June 2009 (age 17)	-	-	(Vietnam) Hồ Chí Minh City	2026 FIFA U-17 World Cup ^{PRE}
FW	Nguyễn Lê Quang Khôi	9 April 2009 (age 17)	-	-	(Vietnam) Hồ Chí Minh City	2026 AFC U-17 Asian Cup ^{PRE}
^{PRE} Preliminary squad; ^{INJ} Player withdrew from the squad due to an injury.; ^{WD} Player withdrew from the squad due to other reason.; ^{SUS} Serving suspension.

=== U-16 ===
==== Current squad ====
The following 34 players were named in the squad are preparing for the 2026 CFA U-17 Team China Cup in September 2026.

No.	Pos.	Player	Date of birth (age)	Club
	GK	Nguyễn Phúc Gia Huy		(Vietnam Football Federation) PVF
	GK	Lê Hoàng Gia Bảo		(Vietnam Football Federation) PVF
	GK	Lê Quang Minh		(Vietnam Football Federation) Hà Tĩnh
	GK	Nguyễn Nhật Tường		(Vietnam Football Federation) Hoàng Anh Gia Lai
	GK	Hoàng Văn Huy		(Vietnam Football Federation) Sông Lam Nghệ An
	DF	Lê Minh Hoàng		(Vietnam Football Federation) Hoàng Anh Gia Lai
	DF	Nguyễn Mạnh Nguyên		(Vietnam Football Federation) Hoàng Anh Gia Lai
	DF	Vũ Huy Hiệu		(Vietnam Football Federation) Hà Nội
	DF	Trần Minh Quân I		(Vietnam Football Federation) Sông Lam Nghệ An
	DF	Vương Đình Minh Quang		(Vietnam Football Federation) PVF
	DF	Nguyễn Văn Tấn		(Vietnam Football Federation) Hà Nội
	DF	Trần Minh Quân II		(Vietnam Football Federation) Hà Nội
	DF	Lê Thế Tài		(Vietnam Football Federation) Sông Lam Nghệ An
	DF	Đặng Cao Duy		(Vietnam Football Federation) PVF
	DF	Võ Bảo Long		(Vietnam Football Federation) Hà Tĩnh
	DF	Nguyễn Văn Cảnh		(Vietnam Football Federation) Sông Lam Nghệ An
	MF	Đỗ Sơn Hải		(Vietnam Football Federation) Thể Công-Viettel
	MF	Nguyễn Xuân Thành		(Vietnam Football Federation) PVF
	MF	Phạm Tuấn Kiệt		(Vietnam Football Federation) PVF
	MF	Đào Tuấn Sáng		(Vietnam Football Federation) Hoàng Anh Gia Lai
	MF	Nguyễn Minh Đạt		(Vietnam Football Federation) Công An Hà Nội
	MF	Nguyễn Minh Nhật		(Vietnam Football Federation) Becamex Ho Chi Minh City
	MF	Trần Văn Đức Uy		(Vietnam Football Federation) Sông Lam Nghệ An
	MF	Nguyễn Thành Đạt		(Vietnam Football Federation) Thể Công-Viettel
	MF	Trương Văn Tài		(Vietnam Football Federation) Sông Lam Nghệ An
	MF	Trần Hải Dương		(Vietnam Football Federation) Hà Nội
	MF	Khá Đức Nguyên		(Vietnam Football Federation) Thể Công-Viettel
	MF	Ngô Quốc Trung		(Vietnam Football Federation) Đồng Tháp
	MF	Nguyễn Trần Trọng Hiệp		(Vietnam Football Federation) PVF
	FW	Ngô Vũ Bảo Trung		(Vietnam Football Federation) Hà Nội
	FW	Nguyễn Văn Tú		(Vietnam Football Federation) Sông Lam Nghệ An
	FW	Dương Ngọc Hiếu		(Vietnam Football Federation) Đồng Tháp
	FW	Hoàng Trung Anh		(Vietnam Football Federation) PVF
	FW	Trần Nguyên Khải		(Vietnam Football Federation) Hải Phòng

==== Recent call-ups ====
The following players have been called up for the team within the last 12 months and are still available for selection.

Pos.	Player	Date of birth (age)	Caps	Goals	Club	Latest call-up
^{PRE} Preliminary squad; ^{INJ} Player withdrew from the squad due to an injury.; ^{WD} Player withdrew from the squad due to other reason.; ^{SUS} Serving suspension.

== Coaching staff ==
=== U-17 ===
As of 18 May 2026

Position	Name
Head coach	Cristiano Roland
Assistant coach	Gabriel Atz; Hoàng Tuấn Anh; Nguyễn Đại Đồng; Nguyễn Ngọc Duy; Hoàng Đình Tùng
Goalkeeper coach	Trần Văn Điền
Fitness coach	Brandi Regato Neto
Interpreter	Lê Sỹ Phương
Doctor	Đặng Đức Giảng; Nguyễn Thanh Giang
Technical director	Yutaka Ikeuchi

=== U-16 ===
As of 16 September 2026

Position	Name
Head coach	Hoàng Anh Tuấn
Assistant coach	Lê Tấn Tài; Âu Văn Hoàn; Unknown; Unknown; Unknown
Goalkeeper coach	Unknown
Fitness coach	Unknown
Interpreter	Unknown
Doctor	Unknown

== Competitive records ==
=== FIFA U-17 World Cup ===
Year	Result	Pld	W	D	L	GF	GA
(China) 1985	Did not enter						
(Canada) 1987	Did not enter						
(Scotland) 1989	Did not enter						
(Italy) 1991	Did not enter						
(Japan) 1993	Did not enter						
(Ecuador) 1995	Did not enter						
(Egypt) 1997	Did not enter						
(New Zealand) 1999	Did not enter						
(Trinidad and Tobago) 2001	Did not qualify						
(Finland) 2003	Did not qualify						
(Peru) 2005	Did not qualify						
(South Korea) 2007	Did not qualify						
(Nigeria) 2009	Did not qualify						
(Mexico) 2011	Did not qualify						
(United Arab Emirates) 2013	Did not qualify						
(Chile) 2015	Did not qualify						
(India) 2017	Did not qualify						
(Brazil) 2019	Did not qualify						
(Indonesia) 2023	Did not qualify						
(Qatar) 2025	Did not qualify						
(Qatar) 2026	In progress	1	0	0	1	2	3
(Qatar) 2027	To be determined						
(Qatar) 2028	To be determined						
(Qatar) 2029	To be determined						
Total:1/24	TBD	1	0	0	1	2	3

FIFA U-17 World Cup history
Season	Round	Opponent	Scores	Result	Venue
2026	Group stage	Belgium	2–3	Lose	Al Rayyan, Qatar
2026	Group stage	New Zealand	–		Al Rayyan, Qatar
2026	Group stage	Mali	–		Al Rayyan, Qatar

=== AFC U-17 Asian Cup ===
AFC U-17 Asian Cup record									Qualification record							
Year	Result	Pos.	Pld	W	D	L	GF	GA	Outcome	Pld	W	D	L	GF	GA	–
(Qatar) 1985	Did not enter								Did not enter							
(Qatar) 1986	Did not enter								Did not enter							
(Thailand) 1988	Did not enter								Did not enter							
(United Arab Emirates) 1990	Did not enter								Did not enter							
(Saudi Arabia) 1992	Did not enter								Did not enter							
(Qatar) 1994	Did not enter								Did not enter							
(Thailand) 1996	Did not enter								Did not enter							
(Qatar) 1998	Did not enter								Did not enter							
(Vietnam) 2000	Fourth place	4th	6	2	1	3	11	13	Qualified as hosts							
(United Arab Emirates) 2002	Group stage	11th	3	0	1	2	2	7	1st of 3	2	1	1	0	3	2	2002
(Japan) 2004	Group stage	16th	3	0	0	3	2	5	1st of 3	2	2	0	0	10	0	2004
(Singapore) 2006	Group stage	9th	3	1	1	1	5	5	1st of 2	2	2	0	0	2	0	2006
(Uzbekistan) 2008	Did not qualify								4th of 6	5	0	2	3	2	11	2008
(Uzbekistan) 2010	Group stage	12th	3	1	0	2	4	10	2nd of 6	5	2	2	1	12	6	2010
(Iran) 2012	Did not qualify								3rd of 6	5	2	1	2	12	9	2012
(Thailand) 2014	Did not qualify								2nd of 4	3	2	0	1	6	3	2014
(India) 2016	Quarter-finals	8th	4	2	0	2	6	15	2nd of 4^{BRU}	3	2	0	1	23	2	2016
(Malaysia) 2018	Group stage	15th	3	0	1	2	1	7	2nd of 4^{BRU}	3	2	0	1	15	5	2018
(Bahrain) ~~2020~~	Did not qualify and canceled								2nd of 5	4	3	0	1	16	2	2020
(Thailand) 2023	Group stage	14th	3	0	1	2	1	6	1st of 4	3	3	0	0	12	0	2023
(Saudi Arabia) 2025	Group stage	13th	3	0	3	0	3	3	2nd of 4^{BRU}	3	1	2	0	3	1	2025
(Saudi Arabia) 2026	Quarter-finals	8th	4	2	0	2	5	9	1st of 6	5	5	0	0	30	0	2026
(Uzbekistan) 2027	Qualified								Directly qualified							2027
(Saudi Arabia) 2028	To be determined								To be determined							2028
(Saudi Arabia) 2029	To be determined								To be determined							2029
Total: 9/23	Fourth place	4th	35	8	8	19	40	80	1st	45	27	8	10	146	41	

Vietnam's AFC U-16/U-17 Championship results history
Season	Round	Opponent	Scores	Result	Venue
2000	Group Stage	Japan	0–2	Lose	Đà Nẵng, Vietnam
2000	Group Stage	Nepal	5–0	Win	Đà Nẵng, Vietnam
2000	Group Stage	China	3–2	Win	Đà Nẵng, Vietnam
2000	Group Stage	Myanmar	1–1	Draw	Đà Nẵng, Vietnam
2000	Semi-finals	Iran	0–4	Lose	Đà Nẵng, Vietnam
2000	Third place play-off	Japan	2–4	Lose	Đà Nẵng, Vietnam
2002	Group Stage	Yemen	0–2	Loss	Dubai, United Arab Emirates
2002	Group Stage	Pakistan	1–1	Draw	Dubai, United Arab Emirates
2002	Group Stage	South Korea	1–4	Loss	Dubai, United Arab Emirates
2004	Group Stage	Laos	1–2	Lose	Naraha, Japan
2004	Group Stage	Oman	1–2	Loss	Naraha, Japan
2004	Group Stage	South Korea	0–1	Loss	Naraha, Japan
2006	Group Stage	Bangladesh	2–0	Won	Bishan, Singapore
2006	Group Stage	China	3–3	Draw	Bishan, Singapore
2006	Group Stage	Syria	0–2	Loss	Bishan, Singapore
2010	Group Stage	Japan	0–6	Loss	Tashkent, Uzbekistan
2010	Group Stage	Australia	1–3	Loss	Tashkent, Uzbekistan
2010	Group Stage	Timor-Leste	3–1	Won	Tashkent, Uzbekistan
2016	Group Stage	Japan	0–7	Loss	Bambolim, India
2016	Group Stage	Australia	3–2	Won	Bambolim, India
2016	Group Stage	Kyrgyzstan	3–1	Draw	Margao, India
2016	Quarter-finals	Iran	0–5	Loss	Margao, India
2018	Group Stage	India	1–1	Loss	Kuala Lumpur, Malaysia
2018	Group Stage	Indonesia	1–1	Draw	Kuala Lumpur, Malaysia
2018	Group Stage	Iran	0–5	Loss	Kuala Lumpur, Malaysia
2023	Group Stage	India	1–1	Draw	Pathum Thani, Thailand
2023	Group Stage	Japan	0–4	Loss	Bangkok, Thailand
2023	Group Stage	Uzbekistan	0–1	Loss	Pathum Thani, Thailand
2025	Group Stage	Australia	1–1	Draw	Taif, Saudi Arabia
2025	Group Stage	Japan	1–1	Draw	Taif, Saudi Arabia
2025	Group Stage	United Arab Emirates	1–1	Draw	Taif, Saudi Arabia
2026	Group Stage	Yemen	1–0	Won	Jeddah, Saudi Arabia
2026	Group Stage	South Korea	1–4	Loss	Jeddah, Saudi Arabia
2026	Group Stage	United Arab Emirates	3–2	Won	Jeddah, Saudi Arabia
2026	Quarter-finals	Australia	0–3	Loss	Jeddah, Saudi Arabia
2027	Group Stage	TBD	–		TBD, Uzbekistan
2027	Group Stage	TBD	–		TBD, Uzbekistan
2027	Group Stage	TBD	–		TBD, Uzbekistan

Notes

- ^{BRU} Qualified as best runners-up

=== ASEAN U-17 Boys' Championship ===
ASEAN U-17 Boys' Championship record
Year	Result	Pos.	Pld	W	D	L	GF	GA
(Malaysia) (Indonesia) 2002	Group stage	7/10	4	1	1	2	14	11
(Thailand) 2005	Group stage	6/7	3	0	1	2	4	9
(Vietnam) 2006	Champions	1/4	3	2	0	1	7	3
(Cambodia) 2007	Third place	3/9	5	2	1	2	6	7
(Indonesia) 2008	Did not enter							
(Thailand) 2009	Cancelled							
(Indonesia) 2010	Champions	1/4	4	3	0	1	4	2
(Laos) 2011	Group stage	5/10	4	2	0	2	15	9
(Laos) 2012	Did not enter							
(Myanmar) 2013	Fourth place	4/10	6	3	1	2	21	4
(Indonesia) 2014	Cancelled							
(Cambodia) 2015	Group stage	8/11	5	1	2	2	10	8
(Cambodia) 2016	Runners-up	2/11	7	5	2	0	21	7
(Thailand) 2017	Champions	1/12	7	6	1	0	18	2
(Indonesia) 2018	Group stage	5/11	5	3	1	1	15	7
(Thailand) 2019	Fourth place	4/12	7	4	0	3	9	6
(Indonesia) 2022	Runners-up	2/12	5	3	0	2	13	4
(Indonesia) 2024	Fourth place	4/12	5	2	1	2	22	9
(Indonesia) 2026	Champions	1/12	5	4	1	0	19	1
Total	4 Trophies	15/17	70	38	12	20	185	85

AFF Youth Championship History
Season	Round	Opponent	Scores	Result	Venue
2002	Group Stage	Myanmar	2–6	Loss	Kuala Lumpur, Malaysia
2002	Group Stage	Singapore	3–3	Draw	Kuala Lumpur, Malaysia
2002	Group Stage	Malaysia	0–2	Loss	Kuala Lumpur, Malaysia
2002	Group Stage	Brunei	9–0	Won	Kuala Lumpur, Malaysia
2005	Group Stage	Laos	1–4	Loss	Bangkok, Thailand
2005	Group Stage	Cambodia	2–2	Draw	Bangkok, Thailand
2005	Group Stage	Malaysia	1–3	Loss	Bangkok, Thailand
2006	Group Stage	Bangladesh	3–1	Won	Nam Định, Vietnam
2006	Group Stage	Myanmar	4–0	Won	Nam Định, Vietnam
2006	Group Stage	Laos	0–2	Loss	Nam Định, Vietnam
2007	Group Stage	Singapore	2–0	Won	Phnom Penh, Cambodia
2007	Group Stage	Myanmar	1–0	Won	Phnom Penh, Cambodia
2007	Group Stage	Laos	2–4	Loss	Phnom Penh, Cambodia
2007	Semi-finals	Thailand	0–2	Loss	Phnom Penh, Cambodia
2007	Third place play-off	Indonesia	1–1 a.e.t (pens. 4–3)	Won	Phnom Penh, Cambodia
2010	Group Stage	China	1–0	Won	Surakarta, Indonesia
2010	Group Stage	Indonesia	1–0	Won	Surakarta, Indonesia
2010	Group Stage	Timor-Leste	1–2	Loss	Surakarta, Indonesia
2010	Final	China	1–0	Won	Surakarta, Indonesia
2011	Group Stage	Singapore	0–5	Loss	Vientiane, Laos
2011	Group Stage	Cambodia	4–1	Won	Vientiane, Laos
2011	Group Stage	Philippines	10–0	Won	Vientiane, Laos
2011	Group Stage	Myanmar	1–3	Loss	Vientiane, Laos
2013	Group Stage	Myanmar	4–0	Won	Naypyidaw, Myanmar
2013	Group Stage	Cambodia	6–0	Won	Naypyidaw, Myanmar
2013	Group Stage	Australia	0–3	Loss	Naypyidaw, Myanmar
2013	Group Stage	Brunei	11–0	Won	Naypyidaw, Myanmar
2013	Semi-finals	Malaysia	0–1	Loss	Naypyidaw, Myanmar
2013	Third place play-off	Australia	0–0 a.e.t (pens. 6–7)	Loss	Naypyidaw, Myanmar
2015	Group Stage	Malaysia	0–1	Loss	Phnom Penh, Cambodia
2015	Group Stage	Brunei	6–1	Won	Phnom Penh, Cambodia
2015	Group Stage	Laos	2–2	Draw	Phnom Penh, Cambodia
2015	Group Stage	Thailand	0–2	Loss	Phnom Penh, Cambodia
2015	Group Stage	Timor-Leste	2–2	Draw	Phnom Penh, Cambodia
2016	Group Stage	Malaysia	3–0	Won	Phnom Penh, Cambodia
2016	Group Stage	Australia	3–0	Won	Phnom Penh, Cambodia
2016	Group Stage	Myanmar	5–1	Won	Phnom Penh, Cambodia
2016	Group Stage	Philippines	3–3	Draw	Phnom Penh, Cambodia
2016	Group Stage	Singapore	3–0	Won	Phnom Penh, Cambodia
2016	Semi-finals	Cambodia	1–0	Won	Phnom Penh, Cambodia
2016	Final	Australia	0–0 a.e.t (pens. 3–5)	Loss	Phnom Penh, Cambodia
2017	Group Stage	Cambodia	2–1	Won	Chonburi, Thailand
2017	Group Stage	Brunei	2–1	Won	Chonburi, Thailand
2017	Group Stage	Philippines	7–0	Won	Chonburi, Thailand
2017	Group Stage	Malaysia	1–0	Won	Chonburi, Thailand
2017	Group Stage	Timor-Leste	4–0	Won	Chonburi, Thailand
2017	Semi-finals	Australia	2–0	Won	Chonburi, Thailand
2017	Final	Thailand	0–0 a.e.t (pens. 4–2)	Won	Chonburi, Thailand
2018	Group Stage	Cambodia	1–0	Won	Gresik, Indonesia
2018	Group Stage	Timor-Leste	4–0	Won	Gresik, Indonesia
2018	Group Stage	Indonesia	2–4	Loss	Sidoarjo, Indonesia
2018	Group Stage	Philippines	6–1	Won	Gresik, Indonesia
2018	Group Stage	Myanmar	2–2	Draw	Sidoarjo, Indonesia
2019	Group Stage	Indonesia	0–2	Loss	Chonburi, Thailand
2019	Group Stage	Philippines	3–1	Won	Chonburi, Thailand
2019	Group Stage	Singapore	1–0	Won	Chonburi, Thailand
2019	Group Stage	Myanmar	3–0	Won	Chonburi, Thailand
2019	Group Stage	Timor-Leste	1–0	Won	Chonburi, Thailand
2019	Semi-finals	Malaysia	1–3	Loss	Chonburi, Thailand
2019	Third place play-off	Indonesia	0–0 a.e.t (pens. 2–3)	Loss	Chonburi, Thailand
2022	Group Stage	Singapore	5–1	Won	Bantul, Indonesia
2022	Group Stage	Philippines	5–0	Won	Bantul, Indonesia
2022	Group Stage	Indonesia	0–2	Loss	Sleman, Indonesia
2022	Semi-finals	Thailand	2–0	Won	Sleman, Indonesia
2022	Final	Indonesia	0–1	Loss	Sleman, Indonesia
2024	Group Stage	Brunei	15–0	Won	Surakarta, Indonesia
2024	Group Stage	Cambodia	1–1	Draw	Surakarta, Indonesia
2024	Group Stage	Myanmar	5–1	Won	Surakarta, Indonesia
2024	Semi-finals	Thailand	1–2	Loss	Surakarta, Indonesia
2024	Third place play-off	Indonesia	0–5	Loss	Surakarta, Indonesia
2026	Group Stage	Malaysia	4–0	Won	Gresik, Indonesia
2026	Group Stage	Timor-Leste	10–0	Won	Gresik, Indonesia
2026	Group Stage	Indonesia	0–0	Draw	Sidoarjo, Indonesia
2026	Semi-finals	Australia	2–1	Won	Sidoarjo, Indonesia
2026	Final	Malaysia	3–0	Won	Sidoarjo, Indonesia

== Head-to-head record ==
=== In FIFA U-17 World Cup ===
Opponent	Pld	W	D	L	GF	GA	GD	Win %
Belgium	1	0	0	1	2	3	−1	0.00
Mali	0	0	0	0	0	0	+0	—
New Zealand	0	0	0	0	0	0	+0	—
Total	1	0	0	1	2	3	−1	0.00

=== In AFC U-17 Asian Cup ===
Opponent	Pld	W	D	L	GF	GA	GD	Win %
Australia	4	1	1	2	5	9	−4	25.00
Bangladesh	1	1	0	0	2	0	+2	100.00
China	2	1	1	0	6	5	+1	50.00
India	2	0	1	1	1	2	−1	0.00
Indonesia	1	0	1	0	1	1	+0	0.00
Iran	3	0	0	3	0	14	−14	0.00
Japan	6	0	1	5	3	24	−21	0.00
Kyrgyzstan	1	1	0	0	3	1	+2	100.00
Laos	1	0	0	1	1	2	−1	0.00
Myanmar	1	0	1	0	1	1	+0	0.00
Nepal	1	1	0	0	5	0	+5	100.00
Oman	1	0	0	1	1	2	−1	0.00
Pakistan	1	0	1	0	1	1	+0	0.00
South Korea	3	0	0	3	2	9	−7	0.00
Syria	1	0	0	1	0	2	−2	0.00
Timor-Leste	1	1	0	0	3	1	+2	100.00
United Arab Emirates	2	1	1	0	4	3	+1	50.00
Uzbekistan	1	0	0	1	0	1	−1	0.00
Yemen	2	1	0	1	1	2	−1	50.00
Total	35	8	8	19	40	80	−40	22.86

== Honours ==
=== Continental ===
- AFC U-17 Asian Cup
  - Fourth place (1): 2000

=== Regional ===
- ASEAN U-17 Boys' Championship

Champions (4): 2006, 2010, 2017, 2026
(silver) Runners-up (2): 2016, 2022

== See also ==
- Vietnam national football team
- Vietnam national under-23 football team
- Vietnam national under-20 football team

Sporting positions
Preceded by 2005 Myanmar	ASEAN Champions; 2006 (First title)	Succeeded by Thailand 2007
Preceded by 2009 (Cancelled)	ASEAN Champions; 2010 (Second title)	Succeeded by Thailand 2011
Preceded by 2016 Australia	ASEAN Champions; 2017 (Third title)	Succeeded by Indonesia 2018
Preceded by 2024 Australia	ASEAN Champions; 2026 (Fourth title)	Succeeded by TBD 2028
