= 2010 AFF U-16 Youth Championship =

2010 AFF U-16 Preparatory Championship

Tournament details
- Host country: Indonesia
- City: Surakarta
- Dates: 20–26 September
- Teams: 4 (from 2 confederations)
- Venue: 1 (in 1 host city)

Final positions
- Champions: Vietnam (2nd title)
- Runners-up: China
- Third place: Timor-Leste
- Fourth place: Indonesia

Tournament statistics
- Matches played: 8
- Goals scored: 14 (1.75 per match)
- Top scorer(s): (China) Liang Yu (Timor-Leste) Rogerio Seran (2 goals)

The 2010 AFF U-16 Youth Championship was held from 20 to 26 September 2010, hosted by Indonesia. Only four teams that were participated, three teams from member associations of the ASEAN Football Federation (AFF) and an invitee team from the East Asian Football Federation (EAFF).

== Tournament ==
All times are Western Indonesia Time (WIB) – UTC+7

=== Group stage ===
Team	Pld	W	D	L	GF	GA	GD	Pts
Vietnam	3	2	0	1	3	2	+1	6
China	3	2	0	1	4	2	+2	6
Timor-Leste	3	1	0	2	2	3	−1	3
Indonesia	3	1	0	2	2	4	−2	3

20 September 2010
15:30

China	0 – 1	Vietnam
Liu Yiming (red card) 74'	Report	Dang Anh Tuan 84'

Manahan Stadium, Surakarta

20 Sept 2010
18:00

Indonesia	1 – 0	Timor-Leste
Antoni 90+1'	Report

Manahan Stadium, Surakarta
Attendance: 10,000

22 Sept 2010
15:30

Timor-Leste	0 – 1	China
	Report	Liang Yu 17'

Manahan Stadium, Surakarta

22 Sept 2010
18:00

Vietnam	1 – 0	Indonesia
Nguyen Do 6'	Report

Manahan Stadium, Surakarta

24 Sept 2010
15:30

Vietnam	1 – 2	Timor-Leste
Ho Ngoc Thang 57'	Report	Nidio 23'; Rogerio 75'

Manahan Stadium, Surakarta

24 Sept 2010
18:00

Indonesia	1 – 3	China
Sun Zhengao 59' (o.g.)	Report	Liang Yu 9'; Chen Shuo 18'; Shen Tianfeng 70'

Manahan Stadium, Surakarta

=== Third place play-off ===
26 Sept 2010
15:30

Timor-Leste	2 – 0	Indonesia
Fidel 50'; Rogerio 56'	Report

Manahan Stadium, Surakarta

=== Final ===
26 Sept 2010
18:00

China	0 – 1	Vietnam
	Report	Nguyen Xuan Nam 44'

Manahan Stadium, Surakarta

== Winner ==
2010 AFF U-16 Youth Championship winners

Vietnam
Second title

== Goal scorers ==
2 goals

- (China) Liang Yu
- (Timor-Leste) Rogerio Seran

1 goal

- (China) Chen Shuo
- (China) Shen Tianfeng
- (Indonesia) Antoni Nugroho
- (Timor-Leste) Nidio Alves
- (Timor-Leste) Fidel Santos
- (Vietnam) Dang Anh Tuan
- (Vietnam) Nguyen Do
- (Vietnam) Ho Ngoc Thang
- (Vietnam) Nguyen Xuan Nam

Own goal

- (China) Sun Zhengao (for Indonesia)
