= 2005 AFF U-17 Youth Championship =

Tournament details
- Host country: Thailand
- City: Bangkok
- Dates: 26 August – 4 September
- Teams: 7 (from 1 confederation)
- Venue(s): 3 (in 1 host city)

Final positions
- Champions: Myanmar (2nd title)
- Runners-up: Thailand
- Third place: Laos
- Fourth place: Malaysia

Tournament statistics
- Matches played: 13
- Goals scored: 57 (4.38 per match)

The AFF U-17 Youth Championship was played for the second time in 2005.

The championship was held in Bangkok, Thailand from 26 August to 4 September 2005

Seven nations took part, all from the ASEAN region. No guest nations were invited.

The seven teams were drawn into 2 groups. One group of 3 nations and the second group of 4 nations. The winners and runners up would progress to the semi-final stage.

== Participant teams ==
- Cambodia
- Indonesia
- Laos
- Malaysia
- Myanmar
- Thailand
- Vietnam

== Venues ==
Bangkok
Suphachalasai Stadium	Royal Thai Army Stadium	Thai-Japanese Stadium
Capacity: 35,000	Capacity: 20,000	Capacity: 6,600

== Fixtures and results ==
=== Group stage ===
==== Group A ====
Team	Pts	Pld	W	D	L	GF	GA	GD
Thailand	6	2	2	0	0	5	3	+2
Myanmar	3	2	1	0	1	7	3	+4
Indonesia	0	2	0	0	2	3	9	–6

26 August 2005
16:00

Thailand	3 – 2	Indonesia

Royal Thai Army Stadium

28 August 2005
16:00

Indonesia	1 – 6	Myanmar

Royal Thai Army Stadium

30 August 2005
16:00

Myanmar	1 – 2	Thailand

Thai-Japanese Stadium

==== Group B ====
Team	Pts	Pld	W	D	L	GF	GA	GD
Laos	7	3	2	1	0	7	2	+5
Malaysia	6	3	2	0	1	6	4	+2
Cambodia	2	3	0	2	1	2	7	–5
Vietnam	1	3	0	1	2	4	9	–5

27 August 2005
16:00

Laos	4 – 1	Vietnam

Royal Thai Army Stadium
27 August 2005
18:00

Malaysia	5 – 0	Cambodia

Royal Thai Army Stadium

29 August 2005
16:00

Cambodia	2 – 2	Vietnam

Royal Thai Army Stadium
29 August 2005
18:00

Malaysia	1 – 3	Laos

Royal Thai Army Stadium

31 August 2005
16:00

Cambodia	0 – 0	Laos

Royal Thai Army Stadium
31 August 2005
18:00

Malaysia	3 – 1	Vietnam

Royal Thai Army Stadium

=== Knockout stage ===
==== Bracket ====
Semi-finals
2 September – Bangkok (Royal Thai Army)
Thailand	3
Malaysia	1
2 September – Bangkok (Royal Thai Army)
Laos	1
Myanmar	2

Final
4 September – Bangkok (Royal Thai Army)
Thailand	4
Myanmar	5
Third place
4 September – Bangkok (Royal Thai Army)
Malaysia	1
Laos	3

==== Semi-finals ====
2 September 2005
18:30

Thailand	3 – 1	Malaysia

Royal Thai Army Stadium

2 September 2005
16:00

Laos	1 – 2	Myanmar

Royal Thai Army Stadium

==== Third place play-off ====
4 September 2005
15:30

Malaysia	1 – 3	Laos

Royal Thai Army Stadium

==== Final ====
4 September 2005
16:00

Thailand	4 – 5	Myanmar

Suphachalasai Stadium

== See also ==
- Football at the Southeast Asian Games
- AFC
- AFC Asian Cup
- East Asian Cup
- Arabian Gulf Cup
- South Asian Football Federation Cup
- West Asian Football Federation Championship
