= 2006 AFF U-17 Youth Championship =

Tournament details
- Host country: Vietnam
- City: Nam Định
- Dates: 12–16 August
- Teams: 4
- Venue(s): 1 (in 1 host city)

Final positions
- Champions: Vietnam (1st title)
- Runners-up: Myanmar
- Third place: Bangladesh
- Fourth place: Laos

Tournament statistics
- Matches played: 6
- Goals scored: 18 (3 per match)

The AFF U-17 Youth Championship was played for the second time in 2005.

The championship was held in Nam Định, Vietnam from 12 to 16 August 2006

Only 4 nations took part, 3 from the ASEAN region and guest nation Bangladesh from the SAFF region

The tournament was played in a round-robin group with the winners of the group crowned champions.

== Participant teams ==
- Bangladesh
- Laos
- Myanmar
- Vietnam

== Fixtures & results ==
Team	Pts	Pld	W	D	L	GF	GA	GD
Vietnam	6	3	2	0	1	7	3	+4
Myanmar	6	3	2	0	1	4	5	–1
Bangladesh	3	3	1	0	2	4	7	–3
Laos	3	3	1	0	2	3	3	0

12 August 2006
15:45

Laos	0 – 1	Myanmar

Thiên Trường Stadium
Attendance: 1,500
12 August 2006
18:00

Bangladesh	1 – 3	Vietnam

Thiên Trường Stadium
Attendance: 1,000

14 August 2006
15:45

Bangladesh	2 – 1	Laos

Thiên Trường Stadium
Attendance: 1,000
14 August 2006
18:00

Vietnam	4 – 0	Myanmar

Thiên Trường Stadium
Attendance: 3,000

16 August 2006
15:45

Myanmar	3 – 1	Bangladesh

Thiên Trường Stadium
Attendance: 500
16 August 2006
18:00

Vietnam	0 – 2	Laos

Thiên Trường Stadium
Attendance: 2,000

== See also ==
- Football at the Southeast Asian Games
- AFC
- AFC Asian Cup
- East Asian Cup
- Arabian Gulf Cup
- South Asian Football Federation Cup
- West Asian Football Federation Championship
