= Myanmar national under-17 football team =

National association football team

Myanmar Under-17
- Nickname: Chinthe
- Association: Myanmar Football Federation
- Confederation: AFC (Asia)
- Sub-confederation: AFF (Southeast Asia)
- Head coach: Kyaw Zay Ya
- Captain: Yan Kyaw Soe
- FIFA code: MYA
First colours	Second colours

First international
- Myanmar 0–5 South Korea (Doha, Qatar; 16 November 1986)

Biggest win
- Myanmar 26–0 Guam (Yangon, Myanmar; 10 June 2001)

Biggest defeat
- Saudi Arabia 6–0 Myanmar (Dammam, Saudi Arabia; 1 October 2022)

AFC U-17 Asian Cup
- Appearances: 4 (first in 1986)
- Best result: Group stage (4 times)

ASEAN U-16 Boys Championship
- Appearances: 9 (first in 2002)
- Best result: Winners (2002 & 2005)

The Myanmar national under-17 football team is the under-17 football team that represents Myanmar at the international football competitions. It is controlled by the Myanmar Football Federation.

== Competitive record ==
=== FIFA U-17 World Cup ===
FIFA U-17 World Cup
Year	Round	PLD	W	D*	L	GS	GA
(China) 1985	Did not enter						
(Canada) 1987	Did not qualify						
(Scotland) 1989	Did not enter						
(Italy) 1991	Did not enter						
(Japan) 1993	Did not enter						
(Ecuador) 1995	Did not enter						
(Egypt) 1997	Did not enter						
(New Zealand) 1999	Did not qualify						
(Trinidad and Tobago) 2001	Did not qualify						
(Finland) 2003	Did not qualify						
(Peru) 2005	Did not qualify						
(South Korea) 2007	Did not qualify						
(Nigeria) 2009	Withdrew						
(Mexico) 2011	Did not qualify						
(United Arab Emirates) 2013	Did not qualify						
(Chile) 2015	Did not qualify						
(India) 2017	Did not qualify						
(Indonesia) 2023	Did not qualify						
(Qatar) 2025	Did not qualify						
(Qatar) 2026	Did not qualify						
Total							

=== AFC U-17 Asian Cup ===
AFC U-17 Asian Cup
Year	Round	PLD	W	D*	L	GF	GA
(Qatar) 1985	Did not enter						
(Qatar) 1986	Group stage	3	1	1	1	2	6
(Thailand) 1988	Did not enter						
(United Arab Emirates) 1990	Did not enter						
(Saudi Arabia) 1992	Did not enter						
(Qatar) 1994	Did not enter						
(Thailand) 1996	Did not enter						
(Qatar) 1998	Did not qualify						
(Vietnam) 2000	Group stage	4	1	1	2	4	7
(United Arab Emirates) 2002	Group stage	3	0	0	3	4	12
(Japan) 2004	Did not qualify						
(Singapore) 2006	Group stage	2	0	0	2	2	11
(Uzbekistan) 2008	Withdrew						
(Uzbekistan) 2010	Did not enter						
(Iran) 2012	Did not enter						
(Thailand) 2014	Did not enter						
(India) 2016	Did not enter						
(Malaysia) 2018	Did not enter						
~~(Bahrain) 2020~~	Cancelled						
(Thailand) 2023	Did not qualify						
(Saudi Arabia) 2025	Did not qualify						
(Saudi Arabia) 2026	Group stage	3	0	1	2	2	7
Total:5/21	Group stage	15	2	3	10	14	43

== Current coaching staff ==
Position	Name
Team Manager	(Myanmar) Nyi Nyi Latt
Head coach	(Myanmar) Kyaw Zay Ya
Assistant coach	(Myanmar) Aung Zaw Myo (Myanmar) Tun Lin Aung
Goalkeeping coach	(Myanmar) Myat Ko Min
Doctor	(Myanmar) Phyo Thet Hlaing Win
Physiotherapist	(Myanmar) Lwin Oo Ko
Media officer	(Myanmar) Win Ko Ko

Source: Myanmar Football Federation

== Players ==
=== Current squad ===
The following players were called up for the most recent fixtures in the 2026 AFC U-17 Asian Cup qualification.

No.	Pos.	Player	Date of birth (age)	Club
1	GK	Latt Tun Lin	30 May 2010 (age 16)	(Myanmar Football Federation) Falcon FC
18	GK	Wai Yan Htet		
22	GK	Min Yo Sai Khant		(Myanmar Football Federation) Falcon FC
12	DF	Satt Paing Aung		(Myanmar Football Federation) Falcon FC
14	DF	Khant Aung Phone		(Myanmar Football Federation) Falcon FC
15	DF	Zaw Win		(Myanmar Football Federation) Myanmar Football Academy
3	DF	Ko Ko Myint Myat		(Myanmar Football Federation) Falcon FC
4	DF	Khant Kyaw Myo	1 January 2009 (age 17)	(Myanmar Football Federation) Myanmar Football Academy
13	DF	Min Thu Myat		(Myanmar Football Federation) Myanmar Football Academy
2	DF	Soe Kyaw Paing		(Myanmar Football Federation) Falcon FC
5	DF	Thi Ha Aung (captain)	3 July 2009 (age 17)	(Myanmar Football Federation) Myawady
17	MF	Phyo Wanna		(Myanmar Football Federation) Falcon FC
23	MF	Khant Kaung		(Myanmar Football Federation) Falcon FC
6	MF	Min Thant Win		(Myanmar Football Federation) Falcon FC
21	MF	Htoo Lwin Han		(Myanmar Football Federation) Falcon FC
7	MF	Htoo Paing Ant		(Myanmar Football Federation) Hantharwady United
19	FW	Naing Aung Ye		(Myanmar Football Federation) Falcon FC
8	FW	Yaung Lin		(Myanmar Football Federation) Falcon FC
9	FW	Wai Yan D		(Myanmar Football Federation) Falcon FC
10	FW	Nyi Thant Nyi	8 May 2010 (age 16)	(Myanmar Football Federation) Falcon FC
11	FW	Myat Min Sai		(Myanmar Football Federation) Falcon FC
16	FW	Lang Thing Chang		(Myanmar Football Federation) Falcon FC
20	FW	Myat Thar Aung		(Myanmar Football Federation) Falcon FC

== Recent results and forthcoming fixtures ==
Win Draw Lose

== Honours ==
=== AFF competitions ===
- AFF U-16 Youth Championship
  - Winners (2): 2002, 2005
  - Runners-up (2): 2006, 2015
  - Third place (1): 2011

=== Invitation ===
- Jockey Club International U15 Youth Invitation Football Tournament
  - Third place (2): 2018, 2019

== Head-to-head record ==
The following table shows Myanmar's head-to-head record in the AFC U-17 Asian Cup.

Opponent	Pld	W	D	L	GF	GA	GD	Win %
Bahrain	1	1	0	0	1	0	+1	100.00
China	2	0	0	2	1	8	−7	0.00
India	1	0	0	1	1	4	−3	0.00
Japan	1	0	0	1	0	2	−2	0.00
Nepal	1	1	0	0	3	0	+3	100.00
North Korea	2	0	1	1	3	7	−4	0.00
Saudi Arabia	1	0	0	1	0	5	−5	0.00
South Korea	1	0	0	1	0	5	−5	0.00
United Arab Emirates	1	0	0	1	2	4	−2	0.00
Vietnam	1	0	1	0	1	1	+0	0.00
Total	12	2	2	8	12	36	−24	16.67
