= 2026 AFC U-17 Asian Cup squads =

The following is a list of squads for each national team competing at the 2026 AFC U-17 Asian Cup. The tournament is taking place in Saudi Arabia, between 5–22 May 2026. It is the 21st U-17 age group competition organised by the Asian Football Confederation.

Players born between 1 January 2009 and 31 December 2011 are eligible to compete in the tournament. Each team has to register a squad of minimum 18 players and maximum 23 players, minimum three of whom must have been goalkeepers (Regulations Articles 26.3). The AFC announced the final lists on 3 May 2025. The full squad listings are below.

The age listed for each player is as of 5 May 2026, the first day of the tournament. A flag is included for coaches who are of a different nationality than their own national team. Players in bold have been capped at full international level.

== Group A ==
=== Myanmar ===
Head coach: Kyaw Zay Ya

No.	Pos.	Player	Date of birth (age)	Club
1	GK	Lin Latt Tun	30 January 2010 (aged 16)	(Myanmar Football Federation) Falcon FC
18	GK	Htet Wai Yan	29 July 2009 (aged 16)	(Myanmar Football Federation) Falcon FC
22	GK	Shin Thant Htoo	7 October 2009 (aged 16)	(Myanmar Football Federation) Falcon FC
2	DF	Paing Soe Kyaw	20 November 2009 (aged 16)	(Myanmar Football Federation) Falcon FC
3	DF	Myint Myat Ko Ko	29 March 2009 (aged 17)	(Myanmar Football Federation) Falcon FC
4	DF	Myo Khant Kyaw	1 January 2009 (aged 17)	(Myanmar Football Federation) Myanmar Football Academy
5	DF	Aung Thi Ha (captain)	3 July 2009 (aged 16)	(Myanmar Football Federation) Myawady
12	DF	Aung Satt Paing	5 September 2009 (aged 16)	(Myanmar Football Federation) Falcon FC
13	DF	Myat Min Thu	5 June 2009 (aged 16)	(Myanmar Football Federation) Myanmar Football Academy
14	DF	Phone Khant Aung	3 August 2009 (aged 16)	(Myanmar Football Federation) Falcon FC
15	DF	Win Zaw	25 February 2009 (aged 17)	(Myanmar Football Federation) Myanmar Football Academy
19	DF	Nay Myo Thu	31 January 2009 (aged 17)	(Myanmar Football Federation) Falcon FC
6	MF	Win Min Thant	27 May 2009 (aged 16)	(Myanmar Football Federation) Falcon FC
7	MF	Ant Htoo Paing	7 June 2009 (aged 16)	(Myanmar Football Federation) Hantharwady United
8	MF	Lin Yaung	14 January 2009 (aged 17)	(Myanmar Football Federation) Falcon FC
11	MF	Sai Myat Min	5 May 2009 (aged 17)	(Myanmar Football Federation) Falcon FC
16	MF	Chang Lang Thing	25 January 2009 (aged 17)	(Myanmar Football Federation) Falcon FC
17	MF	Aung Kaung Myat	11 February 2009 (aged 17)	(Myanmar Football Federation) Falcon FC
20	MF	Aung Myat Thar	28 February 2010 (aged 16)	(Myanmar Football Federation) Falcon FC
21	MF	Han Htoo Lwin	9 November 2009 (aged 16)	(Myanmar Football Federation) Falcon FC
9	FW	D Wai Yan	13 June 2009 (aged 16)	(Myanmar Football Federation) Falcon FC
10	FW	Nyi Nyi Thant	8 May 2010 (aged 15)	(Myanmar Football Federation) Falcon FC
23	FW	Kaung Khant	24 July 2009 (aged 16)	(Myanmar Football Federation) Falcon FC

=== Saudi Arabia ===
The final squad was announced on 30 April 2026.

Head coach: Ahmed Al-Hanfoosh

No.	Pos.	Player	Date of birth (age)	Club
1	GK	Musa Al-Eid	20 April 2009 (aged 17)	(Saudi Arabian Football Federation) Al-Ettifaq
21	GK	Abdullah Al-Mas	18 February 2010 (aged 16)	(Saudi Arabian Football Federation) Al-Shabab
22	GK	Musaed Al-Shammari	23 February 2009 (aged 17)	(Saudi Arabian Football Federation) Al-Ula
2	DF	Abdulrahman Al-Mami	10 February 2010 (aged 16)	(Saudi Arabian Football Federation) Ohod
3	DF	Ahmad Ishak	1 November 2009 (aged 16)	(Saudi Arabian Football Federation) Al-Ula
4	DF	Nawaf Al-Huwiri	6 January 2009 (aged 17)	(Saudi Arabian Football Federation) Al-Taawoun
5	DF	Ali Al-Yahya	7 May 2009 (aged 16)	(Saudi Arabian Football Federation) Al-Fateh
12	DF	Marwan Al-Yami	2 January 2009 (aged 17)	(Saudi Arabian Football Federation) Al-Ittihad
13	DF	Ammar Maimani	16 July 2009 (aged 16)	(Saudi Arabian Football Federation) Al-Ittihad
17	DF	Jawad Al-Hashim	8 February 2009 (aged 17)	(Saudi Arabian Football Federation) Al-Ettifaq
6	MF	Khalid Sharahili	29 August 2009 (aged 16)	(Saudi Arabian Football Federation) Al-Nassr
8	MF	Hassan Al-Okrush	6 February 2009 (aged 17)	(Saudi Arabian Football Federation) Al-Adalah
10	MF	Abdullah Al-Dawsari	26 March 2009 (aged 17)	(Saudi Arabian Football Federation) Al-Ahli
14	MF	Tameem Siraj	17 August 2009 (aged 16)	(Saudi Arabian Football Federation) Al-Ittihad
18	MF	Abdullah Al-Batli	20 October 2009 (aged 16)	(Saudi Arabian Football Federation) Al-Qadsiah
20	MF	Hamad Al-Shammari	20 September 2009 (aged 16)	(Saudi Arabian Football Federation) Al-Qadsiah
23	MF	Yahya Saeed	27 June 2009 (aged 16)	(Saudi Arabian Football Federation) Al-Nassr
7	FW	Ali Al-Hizimi	28 February 2009 (aged 17)	(Saudi Arabian Football Federation) Al-Qadsiah
9	FW	Faris Bushaqraa	18 July 2009 (aged 16)	(Saudi Arabian Football Federation) Al-Qadsiah
11	FW	Ali Al-Makki	3 September 2009 (aged 16)	(Saudi Arabian Football Federation) Al-Qadsiah
15	FW	Ali Al-Shamrani	17 March 2009 (aged 17)	(Saudi Arabian Football Federation) Al-Hilal
16	FW	Faisal Bayomi	13 September 2009 (aged 16)	(Saudi Arabian Football Federation) Al-Ittihad
19	FW	Zaid Al-Buri	11 January 2009 (aged 17)	(Saudi Arabian Football Federation) Al-Hilal

=== Tajikistan ===
The final squad was announced on 24 April 2026.

Head coach: Daler Kayosov

No.	Pos.	Player	Date of birth (age)	Club
1	GK	Mukhammadrakhim Rakhmonov	3 January 2009 (aged 17)	(Tajikistan Football Federation) Khosilot Farkhor
16	GK	Ramazon Abdullozoda	16 September 2010 (aged 15)	(Tajikistan Football Federation) Istiklol
23	GK	Abubakr Rakhmonkulov	5 September 2008 (aged 17)	(Tajikistan Football Federation) Panjshir
3	DF	Muhammadjon Karomatullozoda	5 July 2010 (aged 15)	(Tajikistan Football Federation) Istiklol
4	DF	Sadriddin Sattorov	15 June 2009 (aged 16)	(Tajikistan Football Federation) Khatlon
5	DF	Mustafo Khasanbekov	29 January 2009 (aged 17)	(Tajikistan Football Federation) Khatlon
11	DF	Furkon Rakhimzoda	25 August 2009 (aged 16)	(Tajikistan Football Federation) Khosilot Farkhor
12	DF	Khikmatullo Kabirov	3 July 2010 (aged 15)	(Tajikistan Football Federation) Istiklol
13	DF	Islomjon Khodzhiev	5 July 2009 (aged 16)	(Tajikistan Football Federation) Istiklol
15	DF	Munavar Anvarzod	31 October 2010 (aged 15)	(Tajikistan Football Federation) Istiklol
22	DF	Maktum Alidodov	9 January 2009 (aged 17)	(United Arab Emirates Football Association) Al-Nasr
2	MF	Komiljon Sharipov	1 January 2009 (aged 17)	(Tajikistan Football Federation) Istiklol
6	MF	Yosin Yusupov	17 August 2011 (aged 14)	(Royal Spanish Football Federation) Levante
8	MF	Mekhrubon Odilzoda	15 September 2009 (aged 16)	(Tajikistan Football Federation) Istiklol
9	MF	Mukhammadzhon Mirakhmadov	19 April 2009 (aged 17)	(Tajikistan Football Federation) Barkchi Hisor
14	MF	Olimjon Olimov	28 May 2010 (aged 15)	(Tajikistan Football Federation) Istiklol
17	MF	Parviz Bobonazarov	4 January 2009 (aged 17)	(Tajikistan Football Federation) Khatlon
19	MF	Siyovush Nazarov	13 April 2010 (aged 16)	(Tajikistan Football Federation) Istiklol
20	MF	Azizjon Shodiev	25 July 2010 (aged 15)	(Tajikistan Football Federation) Istiklol
7	FW	Asadbek Makhtumov	30 January 2009 (aged 17)	(Tajikistan Football Federation) Eskhata Khujand
10	FW	Parviz Sanginov	5 October 2009 (aged 16)	(Russian Football Union) Kosmos
18	FW	Bikhishti Radzhabzod	8 August 2010 (aged 15)	(Tajikistan Football Federation) Istiklol
21	FW	Alijon Shukhratjonzoda	21 April 2010 (aged 16)	(Tajikistan Football Federation) Istiklol

=== Thailand ===
The final squad was announced on 1 May 2026.

Head coach: (Germany) Marco Göckel

No.	Pos.	Player	Date of birth (age)	Club
1	GK	Chaophraya Klamchom	4 January 2009 (aged 17)	(Football Association of Thailand) Buriram United
20	GK	Harit Mansin	11 March 2010 (aged 16)	(Football Association of Thailand) Chonburi
23	GK	Thanaphon Thapcharoenphong	25 March 2009 (aged 17)	(Football Association of Thailand) Assumption College
2	DF	Natthakorn Raksa	28 May 2009 (aged 16)	(Football Association of Thailand) Assumption College Thonburi
3	DF	Kanaroot Kanphai	26 August 2009 (aged 16)	(Football Association of Thailand) Bangkok Christian College
4	DF	Paphontee Sertsri	31 January 2009 (aged 17)	(Football Association of Thailand) Chainat Hornbill
6	DF	Phetcharayut Soboonma	21 June 2009 (aged 16)	(Football Association of Thailand) Muangthong United
12	DF	Thanawich Sukyanee	6 January 2009 (aged 17)	(Football Association of Thailand) Assumption College
15	DF	Pongkun Baochaiyo	24 September 2009 (aged 16)	(Football Association of Thailand) Assumption College Sriracha
16	DF	Pracharat Sirikhanti	16 March 2009 (aged 17)	(Football Association of Thailand) Chonburi
17	DF	Thanphisit Peanksikum	6 January 2009 (aged 17)	(Football Association of Thailand) Chonburi
5	MF	Kittawat Nararit	21 September 2009 (aged 16)	(Football Association of Thailand) Bangkok Christian College
8	MF	Phanuphong Jeyakom	18 June 2009 (aged 16)	(Football Association of Thailand) Buriram United
10	MF	Phonphithak Rungrueang	15 September 2009 (aged 16)	(Football Association of Thailand) Buriram United
18	MF	Thatsataporn Phuengkuson	16 March 2009 (aged 17)	(Football Association of Thailand) Wat Suthiwararam School
19	MF	David Gabert	22 January 2009 (aged 17)	(German Football Association) Rot-Weiß Oberhausen
7	FW	Phanuwit Jeyakom	18 June 2009 (aged 16)	(Football Association of Thailand) Buriram United
9	FW	Pakorn Sutthiphapra	25 January 2010 (aged 16)	(Football Association of Thailand) Bangkok Christian College
11	FW	Poramet Laongdee	8 June 2009 (aged 16)	(Football Association of Thailand) Bangkok Christian College
13	FW	Pichaya Chaiwarangkun	7 April 2009 (aged 17)	(Football Association of Thailand) Pathum United
14	FW	Sutthipong Ekbua	12 May 2009 (aged 16)	(Football Association of Thailand) Bangkok Christian College
21	FW	Boonyakorn Pachongsin	30 September 2009 (aged 16)	(Football Association of Thailand) Assumption College
22	FW	Burapha Sawangsri	2 July 2009 (aged 16)	(Football Association of Thailand) Assumption College

== Group B ==
=== China ===
The final squad was announced on 29 April 2026.

Head coach: (Japan) Bin Ukishima

No.	Pos.	Player	Date of birth (age)	Club
1	GK	Qin Ziniu	10 July 2009 (aged 16)	(Chinese Football Association) Evergrande Football School
12	GK	Jiang Chengen	2 May 2010 (aged 16)	(Chinese Football Association) Evergrande Football School
23	GK	Zhu Yuxuan	13 July 2009 (aged 16)	(Royal Spanish Football Federation) Getafe
2	DF	Jin Yucheng	15 June 2009 (aged 16)	(Croatian Football Federation) Lokomotiva Zagreb
3	DF	Nan Zixun	23 March 2009 (aged 17)	(Chinese Football Association) Tsinghua University High School
4	DF	Li Junpeng	19 February 2009 (aged 17)	(Chinese Football Association) Shandong Taishan
5	DF	Zhang Xuyao	22 March 2009 (aged 17)	(Chinese Football Association) Shandong Taishan
16	DF	Wang Xiuhao	21 January 2009 (aged 17)	(Royal Spanish Football Federation) Damm
18	DF	Bian Weihao	15 February 2009 (aged 17)	(Chinese Football Association) Hubei Istar
22	DF	Liu Zhicheng	28 March 2009 (aged 17)	(Chinese Football Association) Qingdao West Coast
6	MF	Zhou Yunuo	26 February 2009 (aged 17)	(Chinese Football Association) Tsinghua University High School
7	MF	He Sifan	14 January 2009 (aged 17)	(Chinese Football Association) Shandong Taishan
8	MF	Kuang Zhaolei	13 March 2009 (aged 17)	(Chinese Football Association) Qingdao Hainiu
9	MF	Xie Jin	21 August 2009 (aged 16)	(Royal Spanish Football Federation) Fuenlabrada
10	MF	Wan Xiang	21 April 2009 (aged 17)	(Football Association of Serbia) Red Star Belgrade
13	MF	Wang Heyi	17 June 2009 (aged 16)	(Chinese Football Association) Guangzhou Yangcheng
15	MF	Pan Chaowei	25 February 2010 (aged 16)	(Chinese Football Association) Shandong Taishan
17	MF	Xu Zhengpeng	15 March 2009 (aged 17)	(Chinese Football Association) Wuhan Three Towns
19	MF	Peng Xianchen	6 January 2010 (aged 16)	(Chinese Football Association) Yixing Zhoutie Jiuteng
21	MF	Kong Xinuo	22 May 2009 (aged 16)	(Chinese Football Association) Shandong Taishan
11	FW	Shuai Weihao	5 January 2009 (aged 17)	(Chinese Football Association) Chengdu Rongcheng
14	FW	Zhao Songyuan	7 April 2009 (aged 17)	(Chinese Football Association) Tsinghua University High School
20	FW	Zhang Bolin	30 December 2009 (aged 16)	(Chinese Football Association) Hubei Istar

=== Indonesia ===
The final squad was announced on 30 April 2026.

Head coach: Kurniawan Dwi Yulianto

No.	Pos.	Player	Date of birth (age)	Club
1	GK	Mike Rajasa	6 February 2009 (aged 17)	(Royal Dutch Football Association) Utrecht
20	GK	Abdillah Ishak	3 March 2010 (aged 16)	(Football Association of Indonesia) Persija Jakarta
22	GK	Noah Duvert	30 April 2009 (aged 17)	(Football Association of Indonesia) Bali United
2	DF	Made Arbi	5 October 2009 (aged 16)	(Football Association of Indonesia) Bali United
3	DF	Farik Rizqi	4 May 2009 (aged 17)	(Football Association of Indonesia) Adhyaksa Banten
4	DF	Putu Ekayana	1 September 2009 (aged 16)	(Football Association of Indonesia) Bali United
5	DF	Mathew Baker (captain)	13 May 2009 (aged 16)	(Football Australia) Melbourne City
12	DF	Peres Akwila	25 May 2009 (aged 16)	(Football Association of Indonesia) Persija Jakarta
14	DF	Farrel Luckyta	10 June 2009 (aged 16)	(Football Association of Indonesia) PSS Sleman
16	DF	Pandu Aryo	22 October 2009 (aged 16)	(Football Association of Indonesia) Persik Kediri
23	DF	Zidane Raditya	1 May 2009 (aged 17)	(Football Association of Indonesia) Persis Solo
6	MF	Girly Andrade	15 February 2009 (aged 17)	(Football Association of Indonesia) Persik Kediri
8	MF	Fardan Farras	19 April 2009 (aged 17)	(Football Association of Indonesia) Borneo Samarinda
9	MF	Chico Jericho	28 March 2010 (aged 16)	(Football Association of Indonesia) ASIOP
10	MF	Keanu Senjaya	12 December 2009 (aged 16)	(Football Association of Indonesia) Bali United
15	MF	Miraj Rizky	30 July 2009 (aged 16)	(Football Association of Indonesia) Adhyaksa Banten
18	MF	Noha Simangunsong	12 March 2010 (aged 16)	(Royal Dutch Football Association) NAC Breda
19	MF	Ichiro Akbar	9 January 2010 (aged 16)	(Football Association of Indonesia) Bhayangkara Presisi Lampung
21	MF	Alfredo Nararya	24 February 2009 (aged 17)	(Football Association of Indonesia) Persebaya Surabaya
7	FW	Dava Yunna	20 April 2009 (aged 17)	(Football Association of Indonesia) Persebaya Surabaya
11	FW	Ridho	19 October 2009 (aged 16)	(Football Association of Indonesia) Persija Jakarta
13	FW	Sean Kastor	1 August 2009 (aged 16)	(Football Association of Indonesia) Persik Kediri
17	FW	Fardan Ary Setyawan	9 February 2009 (aged 17)	(Football Association of Indonesia) Adhyaksa Banten

=== Japan ===
The final squad was announced on 20 April 2026. Riku Hashimoto was replaced by Yuto Iwashita.

Head coach: Shinji Ono

No.	Pos.	Player	Date of birth (age)	Club
1	GK	Kosei Oshita	7 August 2009 (aged 16)	(Japan Football Association) Kashima Antlers
12	GK	Rento Kida	25 May 2010 (aged 15)	(Japan Football Association) Teikyo Nagaoka High School
23	GK	Koki Takahashi	28 February 2009 (aged 17)	(Japan Football Association) Taisei High School
2	DF	Yuto Iwashita	20 February 2009 (aged 17)	(Japan Football Association) Shizuoka Shoyo High School
3	DF	Anthony Motosuna	10 March 2009 (aged 17)	(Japan Football Association) Kashima Antlers
4	DF	Yuzo Takeuchi	27 May 2010 (aged 15)	(Japan Football Association) Nagoya Grampus
13	DF	Chimezie Ezemuokwe	2 April 2009 (aged 17)	(Japan Football Association) Cerezo Osaka
20	DF	Yoshito Kumada	5 September 2009 (aged 16)	(Japan Football Association) Omiya Ardija
22	DF	Koki Kurahashi	5 July 2009 (aged 16)	(Japan Football Association) Kashima Antlers
5	MF	Sosuke Hoshi	3 March 2009 (aged 17)	(Japan Football Association) Shoshi High School
6	MF	Sora Iwatsuchi	1 May 2009 (aged 17)	(Japan Football Association) Kashima Antlers
7	MF	Kaiji Chonan	7 April 2009 (aged 17)	(Japan Football Association) Kashiwa Reysol
8	MF	Takeshi Wada	5 June 2009 (aged 16)	(Japan Football Association) Urawa Red Diamonds
10	MF	Maki Kitahara	7 July 2009 (aged 16)	(Japan Football Association) Tokyo
14	MF	Tafuku Satomi	20 April 2009 (aged 17)	(Japan Football Association) Vissel Kobe
15	MF	Ryoma Tsuneyoshi	12 February 2009 (aged 17)	(Japan Football Association) Nagoya Grampus
16	MF	Kazato Kimura	16 September 2009 (aged 16)	(Japan Football Association) Kawasaki Frontale
17	MF	Yoshiki Fujimoto	2 April 2009 (aged 17)	(Japan Football Association) Gamba Osaka
18	MF	Rekuto Shiraogawa	11 January 2009 (aged 17)	(Japan Football Association) Nagoya Grampus
19	MF	Shun Tatemi	2 February 2009 (aged 17)	(Japan Football Association) Shutoku High School
21	MF	Arata Okamoto	16 December 2009 (aged 16)	(Japan Football Association) Gamba Osaka
9	FW	Eito Takaki	8 August 2009 (aged 16)	(Japan Football Association) Kashima Antlers
11	FW	Kakeru Saito	23 February 2009 (aged 17)	(Japan Football Association) Yokohama

=== Qatar ===
The final squad was announced on 1 May 2026.

Head coach: (Spain) Álvaro Mejía

No.	Pos.	Player	Date of birth (age)	Club
1	GK	Bakri Mohammed	2 July 2009 (aged 16)	(Qatar Football Association) Al-Rayyan
21	GK	Mohamed Fadil	14 February 2009 (aged 17)	(Qatar Football Association) Al-Duhail SC
22	GK	Aaron Robson	28 March 2009 (aged 17)	(Qatar Football Association) Al-Sadd
2	DF	Ghassan El-Toum	2 June 2009 (aged 16)	(Qatar Football Association) Al-Rayyan
3	DF	Adham Adnan	20 January 2010 (aged 16)	(Qatar Football Association) Al-Duhail SC
4	DF	Sami Darani	11 March 2009 (aged 17)	(Qatar Football Association) Al-Sadd
5	DF	Taha Nassir	28 October 2009 (aged 16)	(Qatar Football Association) Al-Duhail SC
12	DF	Tariq Yaghmour	30 April 2009 (aged 17)	(Qatar Football Association) Al-Sadd
13	DF	Youssef Ali	19 March 2009 (aged 17)	(Qatar Football Association) Al-Rayyan
16	DF	Ahmed Wael	1 December 2009 (aged 16)	(Qatar Football Association) Al-Arabi
17	DF	Saad Mohamed	17 August 2009 (aged 16)	(Qatar Football Association) Al-Shamal
6	MF	Hadi Khalil	3 November 2009 (aged 16)	(Qatar Football Association) Al-Duhail SC
8	MF	Mohamed Fadl	10 April 2009 (aged 17)	(Qatar Football Association) Al-Sadd
15	MF	Ahmed Abou El-Komsan	5 April 2010 (aged 16)	(Qatar Football Association) Al-Rayyan
18	MF	Shaher Roustom	30 December 2009 (aged 16)	(Qatar Football Association) Al-Duhail SC
23	MF	Karim Hariri	19 May 2009 (aged 16)	(Qatar Football Association) Al-Duhail SC
7	FW	Dhiaeddine Benyatla	2 January 2010 (aged 16)	(Qatar Football Association) Al-Gharafa
9	FW	Mohsain Al-Hajri	18 January 2009 (aged 17)	(Qatar Football Association) Al-Rayyan
10	FW	Osama Mohamed	12 November 2009 (aged 16)	(Qatar Football Association) Al-Sadd
11	FW	Faisal Al-Hamad	6 February 2009 (aged 17)	(Qatar Football Association) Qatar
14	FW	Abdoulaye N'Diaye	24 September 2009 (aged 16)	
19	FW	Amr Mohamed Ezzat	6 May 2009 (aged 16)	(Qatar Football Association) Al-Duhail SC
20	FW	Ayokunle Tokode	13 July 2009 (aged 16)	

== Group C ==
=== South Korea ===
The final squad was announced on 24 April 2026.

Head coach: Kim Hyun-jun

No.	Pos.	Player	Date of birth (age)	Club
1	GK	Jang Jun-yeong	27 August 2009 (aged 16)	(Korea Football Association) Pohang Steelers
12	GK	Lee Sung-hwa	20 March 2009 (aged 17)	(Korea Football Association) Boin High School
21	GK	Moon Yu-no	15 December 2009 (aged 16)	(Korea Football Association) Jeju
2	DF	Park Ji-hu	23 January 2009 (aged 17)	(Korea Football Association) Seoul
3	DF	Choi Jae-hyeok	4 November 2009 (aged 16)	(Korea Football Association) Gangwon
4	DF	Seong Min-su	5 February 2009 (aged 17)	(Korea Football Association) Pohang Steelers
5	DF	Choi Geon-min	16 November 2009 (aged 16)	(Korea Football Association) Jeonbuk Hyundai
13	DF	Im Yun-ho	13 June 2009 (aged 16)	(Korea Football Association) Gimcheon Sangmu
15	DF	Jun Nam-koong	7 January 2009 (aged 17)	(Korea Football Association) Bucheon
19	DF	Kang Mu-sung	29 March 2009 (aged 17)	(Korea Football Association) Ulsan
20	DF	Choi Min-jun	15 April 2009 (aged 17)	(Korea Football Association) Pohang Steelers
6	MF	Jung Ha-won	30 March 2009 (aged 17)	(Korea Football Association) Seoul
7	MF	Ahn Joo-wan	14 April 2009 (aged 17)	(Korea Football Association) Seoul E-Land
8	MF	Han Seung-min	9 November 2009 (aged 16)	(Korea Football Association) Jeonbuk Hyundai
11	MF	Kim Ji-ho	18 April 2009 (aged 17)	(Korea Football Association) Daejeon Hana Citizen
14	MF	An Sun-hyun	5 September 2009 (aged 16)	(Korea Football Association) Pohang Steelers
16	MF	Moon Ji-hwan	4 May 2009 (aged 17)	(Korea Football Association) Seoul
17	MF	Koo Hun-min	24 April 2009 (aged 17)	(Korea Football Association) Daejeon Hana Citizen
18	MF	Park Kyung-hoon	8 March 2009 (aged 17)	(Korea Football Association) Suwon Samsung
22	MF	Lee In-woo	2 June 2009 (aged 16)	(Korea Football Association) Suwon Samsung
23	MF	Kim Tae-ho	29 January 2009 (aged 17)	(Korea Football Association) Gyeonggibuk Science High School
9	FW	Ian Nam	3 January 2009 (aged 17)	(Korea Football Association) Ulsan
10	FW	Kim Ji-woo	2 January 2009 (aged 17)	(Korea Football Association) Busan IPark

=== United Arab Emirates ===
The final squad was announced on 1 May 2026.

Head coach: Majed Al-Zaabi

No.	Pos.	Player	Date of birth (age)	Club
1	GK	Josh Bentley	13 January 2009 (aged 17)	(The Football Association) Ipswich Town
17	GK	Sultan Johar	10 March 2010 (aged 16)	(United Arab Emirates Football Association) Sharjah
22	GK	Mubarak Ahmed	1 April 2009 (aged 17)	(United Arab Emirates Football Association) Al-Jazira
2	DF	Johannes Waimer	28 February 2009 (aged 17)	(German Football Association) FC Augsburg
3	DF	Sultan Qasem	10 August 2009 (aged 16)	(United Arab Emirates Football Association) Al-Nasr
4	DF	Abdulla Awadh	19 January 2009 (aged 17)	(United Arab Emirates Football Association) Shabab Al-Ahli
6	DF	Abdelrahman Walid	15 May 2009 (aged 16)	(United Arab Emirates Football Association) Al-Jazira
16	DF	Ali Hamad	15 April 2009 (aged 17)	(United Arab Emirates Football Association) Sharjah
18	DF	Butti Khamis	31 May 2009 (aged 16)	(United Arab Emirates Football Association) Al-Jazira
23	DF	Mohammed Musa	1 March 2009 (aged 17)	(United Arab Emirates Football Association) Shabab Al-Ahli
5	MF	Sultan Nasir	11 October 2009 (aged 16)	(United Arab Emirates Football Association) Sharjah
7	MF	Salem Gamal	23 April 2010 (aged 16)	(United Arab Emirates Football Association) Shabab Al-Ahli
8	MF	Saud Yaqoob	30 January 2009 (aged 17)	(United Arab Emirates Football Association) Al-Ain
10	MF	Hussain Yousuf	14 July 2009 (aged 16)	(United Arab Emirates Football Association) Al-Wasl
13	MF	Gabriel El-Khoury	26 April 2009 (aged 17)	(United Arab Emirates Football Association) Fursan Hispania
19	MF	Faris Ali	19 March 2009 (aged 17)	(United Arab Emirates Football Association) Shabab Al-Ahli
9	FW	Jayden Adetiba	1 January 2009 (aged 17)	(The Football Association) Ipswich Town
11	FW	Eisa Ahmed	8 April 2009 (aged 17)	(United Arab Emirates Football Association) Kalba
12	FW	Ali Hassan	3 August 2009 (aged 16)	(United Arab Emirates Football Association) Al-Nasr
14	FW	Mahmoud Badr	18 March 2009 (aged 17)	(Royal Spanish Football Federation) Celta Vigo
15	FW	Salem Fahad	8 January 2010 (aged 16)	(United Arab Emirates Football Association) Al-Jazira
20	FW	Adam Mahrous	17 September 2009 (aged 16)	(United Arab Emirates Football Association) Al-Wasl
21	FW	Hamza Swed	1 January 2010 (aged 16)	(The Football Association) Manchester City

=== Vietnam ===
The final squad was announced on 1 May 2026.

Head coach: (Brazil) Cristiano Roland

No.	Pos.	Player	Date of birth (age)	Club
1	GK	Chu Bá Huấn	26 January 2009 (aged 17)	(Vietnam Football Federation) Hà Nội
12	GK	Nguyễn Tuấn Vũ	17 April 2009 (aged 17)	(Vietnam Football Federation) Đông Á Thanh Hóa
23	GK	Lý Xuân Hòa	21 July 2009 (aged 16)	(Vietnam Football Federation) PVF
2	DF	Phạm Minh Cường	21 September 2009 (aged 16)	(Vietnam Football Federation) Huế
3	DF	Nguyễn Mạnh Cường	25 February 2009 (aged 17)	(Vietnam Football Federation) Thể Công-Viettel
4	DF	Nguyễn Huỳnh Đăng Khoa (captain)	18 February 2009 (aged 17)	(Vietnam Football Federation) PVF
5	DF	Trần Hoàng Việt	22 February 2009 (aged 17)	(Vietnam Football Federation) Hà Nội
13	DF	Nguyễn Ngọc Anh Hào	27 November 2009 (aged 16)	(Vietnam Football Federation) PVF
14	DF	Quán Thành Công	16 June 2009 (aged 16)	(Vietnam Football Federation) Sông Lam Nghệ An
15	DF	Nguyễn Khắc Minh Đức	10 July 2009 (aged 16)	(Vietnam Football Federation) Hà Nội
6	MF	Đào Quý Vương	10 September 2009 (aged 16)	(Vietnam Football Federation) Hà Nội
7	MF	Nguyễn Hiệp Đại Việt Nam	17 March 2009 (aged 17)	(Vietnam Football Federation) Thép Xanh Nam Định
8	MF	Nguyễn Minh Thủy	12 February 2009 (aged 17)	(Vietnam Football Federation) Sông Lam Nghệ An
10	MF	Chu Ngọc Nguyễn Lực	28 July 2009 (aged 16)	(Vietnam Football Federation) Hà Nội
17	MF	Trương Nguyễn Duy Khang	30 March 2009 (aged 17)	(Vietnam Football Federation) PVF
18	MF	Triệu Đình Vỹ	10 November 2009 (aged 16)	(Vietnam Football Federation) Thể Công-Viettel
9	FW	Lê Trọng Đại Nhân	8 October 2009 (aged 16)	(Vietnam Football Federation) Thể Công-Viettel
11	FW	Nguyễn Văn Dương	6 October 2009 (aged 16)	(Vietnam Football Federation) PVF
16	FW	Trần Ngọc Sơn	2 January 2009 (aged 17)	(Vietnam Football Federation) Sông Lam Nghệ An
19	FW	Trần Mạnh Quân	28 June 2010 (aged 15)	(Vietnam Football Federation) Hà Nội
20	FW	Lê Sỹ Bách	4 January 2009 (aged 17)	(Vietnam Football Federation) PVF
21	FW	Trần Trí Dũng	24 March 2009 (aged 17)	(Vietnam Football Federation) Thể Công-Viettel
22	FW	Đậu Quang Hưng	28 June 2009 (aged 16)	(Vietnam Football Federation) Hồ Chí Minh City

=== Yemen ===
The final squad was announced on 6 May 2026.

Head coach: Haitham Thabit

No.	Pos.	Player	Date of birth (age)	Club
1	GK	Wessam Al-Asbahi	3 June 2009 (aged 16)	(Yemen Football Association) Al-Ahli Sanaa
22	GK	Khaled Waleed	4 March 2009 (aged 17)	(Yemen Football Association) Arfan Abyan
23	GK	Amr Wasim	11 April 2010 (aged 16)	(Yemen Football Association) Al-Raidah Hadramout
3	DF	Sailan Basheer	9 February 2010 (aged 16)	(Yemen Football Association) Al-Shaab Sanaa
4	DF	Ali Al-Maghdi	24 January 2010 (aged 16)	(Yemen Football Association) Al-Wehda Sanaa
5	DF	Akram Khaled	30 September 2010 (aged 15)	(Yemen Football Association) Al-Wehda Sanaa
6	DF	Saber Sanad	1 February 2011 (aged 15)	(Yemen Football Association) Al-Ahli Aden
12	DF	Ahmed Al-Jledy	30 October 2009 (aged 16)	(Yemen Football Association) Al-Wehda Sanaa
14	DF	Ebrahim Anwar	21 November 2011 (aged 14)	(Yemen Football Association) Al-Ahli Aden
21	DF	Ahmed Ameen	9 April 2010 (aged 16)	(Yemen Football Association) May 22 San'a
7	MF	Ahmed Nasser	5 November 2010 (aged 15)	(Yemen Football Association) Al-Ahli Aden
8	MF	Ayman Al-Obadi	3 January 2009 (aged 17)	(Yemen Football Association) Al-Wehda Sanaa
13	MF	Mohammed Shafea	21 May 2010 (aged 15)	(Yemen Football Association) Al-Ahli Aden
15	MF	Khaled Rezq	1 September 2010 (aged 15)	(Yemen Football Association) Al-Yarmuk
17	MF	Amr Al-Hakami	28 June 2011 (aged 14)	(Yemen Football Association) Al-Oruba
19	MF	Mohsen Salem	13 May 2009 (aged 16)	(Yemen Football Association) Al-Wehda Aden
2	FW	Fahim Zuhair	17 July 2010 (aged 15)	(Yemen Football Association) Al-Tilal
9	FW	Mohammed Sadeq	12 November 2011 (aged 14)	(Yemen Football Association) Al-Oruba
10	FW	Ali Safeq	2 July 2010 (aged 15)	(Yemen Football Association) Al-Wehda Sanaa
11	FW	Haitham Tawfik	3 December 2009 (aged 16)	(Yemen Football Association) Al-Oruba
16	FW	Anmar Al-Abd	26 January 2009 (aged 17)	(Yemen Football Association) Qusayʽir-Hadramout
18	FW	Abdulrahman Al-Qufaili	2 October 2010 (aged 15)	(Yemen Football Association) Al-Saqr
20	FW	Mohammed Al-Ksaam	1 January 2010 (aged 16)	(Yemen Football Association) Al-Yarmuk

== Group D ==
=== Australia ===
The final squad was announced on 27 April 2026.

Head coach: Carl Veart

No.	Pos.	Player	Date of birth (age)	Caps	Goals	Club
1	GK	Charlie Wilson-Papps	13 September 2009 (aged 16)	4	0	(The Football Association) Brighton & Hove Albion
12	GK	Lachlan Allen	4 April 2009 (aged 17)	6	0	(Football Australia) Western Sydney Wanderers
18	GK	Hugo Ng	3 January 2009 (aged 17)	0	0	(Football Australia) Adelaide United
2	DF	Winston Ashburner	2 February 2009 (aged 17)	9	0	(Football Australia) Melbourne Victory
3	DF	Besian Kutleshi	28 February 2009 (aged 17)	15	0	(Football Australia) Melbourne City
4	DF	Marcus Savic	21 March 2009 (aged 17)	10	0	(Football Australia) Western Sydney Wanderers
5	DF	Miles Milliner	10 August 2009 (aged 16)	15	2	(Football Australia) Sydney FC
13	DF	Arnie Mitchell	6 May 2009 (aged 16)	1	0	(Football Australia) Brisbane Roar
14	DF	Fraser Brown	29 August 2009 (aged 16)	4	0	(Football Australia) Melbourne City
15	DF	Emile Katrib	17 July 2009 (aged 16)	8	1	(Football Australia) Western Sydney Wanderers
19	DF	Stevan Rujak	29 August 2009 (aged 16)	3	0	(Football Australia) Western Sydney Wanderers
22	DF	Harrison Bond	19 January 2009 (aged 17)	2	0	(Austrian Football Association) Red Bull Salzburg
6	MF	Sajjad Nasiri	3 February 2009 (aged 17)	8	0	(Football Australia) Adelaide United
7	MF	Aston Reid	2 April 2009 (aged 17)	12	3	(Football Australia) Sydney FC
8	MF	Oliver O'Carroll	16 May 2009 (aged 16)	6	1	(Football Australia) Melbourne City
21	MF	Luka Demuth	24 January 2010 (aged 16)	7	0	(Football Australia) Melbourne City
23	MF	Corey Da Cruz	24 April 2009 (aged 17)	6	2	(Football Australia) Sydney FC
9	FW	Luke Becvinovski	4 May 2009 (aged 17)	11	9	(Football Australia) Melbourne City
10	FW	Akol Akon	21 May 2009 (aged 16)	13	3	(Football Australia) Sydney FC
11	FW	Max Court	16 January 2009 (aged 17)	7	5	(Football Australia) APIA Leichhardt
16	FW	Akeem Gerald	1 February 2010 (aged 16)	6	0	(Football Australia) Melbourne City
17	FW	Henrique Oliveira	17 January 2009 (aged 17)	8	2	(Football Australia) Macarthur FC
20	FW	Georgio Hassarati	3 March 2009 (aged 17)	12	17	(Football Australia) Western Sydney Wanderers

=== India ===
The final squad was announced on 1 May 2026.

Head coach: Bibiano Fernandes

No.	Pos.	Player	Date of birth (age)	Caps	Goals	Club
1	GK	Rajrup Sarkar	12 August 2009 (aged 16)	7	0	(All India Football Federation) Zinc FA
21	GK	Manashjyoti Baruah	10 January 2009 (aged 17)	5	0	(All India Football Federation) RFYC
22	GK	Alok Nishad	5 March 2009 (aged 17)	1	0	(All India Football Federation) Sreenidi Deccan
2	DF	Lesvin Rebelo	3 July 2009 (aged 16)	7	0	(All India Football Federation) Goa Academy
3	DF	Indra Rana Magar	4 November 2009 (aged 16)	7	0	(All India Football Federation) RFYC
4	DF	Shubham Poonia	3 December 2009 (aged 16)	13	1	(All India Football Federation) NorthEast United
5	DF	Korou Meitei Konthoujam	3 March 2009 (aged 17)	0	0	(All India Football Federation) Classic FA
13	DF	Lawmsangzuala	1 January 2009 (aged 17)	11	0	(All India Football Federation) AIFF FIFA TA
14	DF	Abhishek Kumar Mondal	25 May 2010 (aged 15)	2	0	(All India Football Federation) Mohun Bagan SG
16	DF	Md Aimaan Bin	16 March 2009 (aged 17)	13	0	(All India Football Federation) Sudeva Delhi
6	MF	Moosa Ashiq	17 July 2009 (aged 16)	4	0	(All India Football Federation) Minerva Academy
8	MF	Nitishkumar Meitei	8 June 2009 (aged 16)	2	0	(All India Football Federation) Chennaiyin
10	MF	Dallalmuon Gangte (captain)	11 July 2010 (aged 15)	14	9	(All India Football Federation) NorthEast United
11	MF	Diamond Singh Thokchom	13 June 2010 (aged 15)	11	1	(All India Football Federation) AIFF FIFA TA
23	MF	Denny Singh Wangkhem	1 September 2009 (aged 16)	15	2	(All India Football Federation) FC Mangalore
7	FW	Azlan Shah KH	5 May 2008 (aged 18)	16	3	(All India Football Federation) Minerva Academy
9	FW	Washington Singh	9 August 2009 (aged 16)	5	2	(All India Football Federation) Classic FA
12	FW	Raj Singh Wahengbam	15 July 2010 (aged 15)	0	0	(All India Football Federation) Minerva Academy
15	FW	Yuvraj Kadam	17 March 2009 (aged 17)	4	0	(All India Football Federation) SAI RC
17	FW	Rahan Ahmed	1 January 2009 (aged 17)	11	2	(All India Football Federation) AIFF FIFA TA
18	FW	Adil Aman Anulgal	2 March 2009 (aged 17)	2	0	(All India Football Federation) FC Madras
19	FW	Heerangamba Seram	3 March 2009 (aged 17)	5	0	(All India Football Federation) Jamshedpur Academy
20	FW	Gunleiba Wangkheirakpam	11 September 2009 (aged 16)	13	5	(All India Football Federation) NorthEast United

=== Uzbekistan ===
The final squad was announced on 22 April 2026.

Head coach: Sergey Chigodaev

No.	Pos.	Player	Date of birth (age)	Club
1	GK	Olimjon Shomurotov	11 March 2009 (aged 17)	(Uzbekistan Football Association) Pakhtakor
12	GK	Mekhroj Sirojiddinov	28 March 2009 (aged 17)	(Uzbekistan Football Association) Republic Football Academy
21	GK	Abdulboriy Zoidjonov	1 January 2009 (aged 17)	(Uzbekistan Football Association) Lokomotiv
2	DF	Mashkhurbek Abdisoliev	1 January 2009 (aged 17)	(Uzbekistan Football Association) Nasaf
3	DF	Mukhammadaziz Ruziboev	8 July 2009 (aged 16)	(Uzbekistan Football Association) Gazalkent
4	DF	Muhammad Khakimov	4 October 2009 (aged 16)	(Uzbekistan Football Association) Bunyodkor
5	DF	Elsevar Olimov	1 January 2009 (aged 17)	(Uzbekistan Football Association) Neftchi
13	DF	Mirjamol Anvarov	12 June 2009 (aged 16)	(Uzbekistan Football Association) Odil Ahmedov Football Academy
15	DF	Nurmukhammad Uktamov	23 June 2009 (aged 16)	(Uzbekistan Football Association) Pakhtakor
16	DF	Adis Abdunabiev	10 December 2009 (aged 16)	(Uzbekistan Football Association) Oqtepa
22	DF	Abubakir Rakhimov	4 May 2009 (aged 17)	(Uzbekistan Football Association) Odil Ahmedov Football Academy
6	MF	Mukhammad Mamatov	20 July 2009 (aged 16)	(Uzbekistan Football Association) Pakhtakor
7	MF	Amirkhon Erkinov	10 January 2009 (aged 17)	(Uzbekistan Football Association) Odil Ahmedov Football Academy
8	MF	Islom Ravshanov	14 April 2009 (aged 17)	(Uzbekistan Football Association) Pakhtakor
10	MF	Mirkomil Murodov	19 September 2009 (aged 16)	(Uzbekistan Football Association) Bunyodkor
11	MF	Sukhrob Sadirjonov	31 March 2009 (aged 17)	(Uzbekistan Football Association) Gazalkent
14	MF	Mukhammadodilkhon Orifkhonov	28 December 2009 (aged 16)	(Uzbekistan Football Association) Odil Ahmedov Football Academy
17	MF	Jakhongirmirzo Uktamboev	10 July 2009 (aged 16)	(Uzbekistan Football Association) Bunyodkor
18	MF	Farrukh Khaitmurodov	13 January 2009 (aged 20)	(Uzbekistan Football Association) Pakhtakor
19	MF	Akhror Ravshanbekov	23 May 2009 (aged 16)	(Uzbekistan Football Association) Andijon
9	FW	Asilbek Aliev	1 January 2009 (aged 17)	(Uzbekistan Football Association) Republic Football Academy
20	FW	Laziz Abduraimov	26 October 2009 (aged 16)	(Uzbekistan Football Association) Bunyodkor
23	FW	Rustam Aliev	30 May 2009 (aged 19)	(Uzbekistan Football Association) Surkhon
