= 2025 CFA Team China U-16 Cup =

2025 CFA Team China U-16
2025CFA中国之队·呼和浩特国际足球锦标赛

Tournament details
- Host country: China
- City: Hohhot
- Dates: 28 May–1 June
- Teams: 4 (from 1 confederation)
- Venue: 1

Tournament statistics
- Matches played: 6
- Goals scored: 23 (3.83 per match)
- Top scorer: 6 players (1 goal each)

The 2025 CFA Team China U-16 Cup was the second edition of the under-16 CFA Cup organised by Chinese Football Association (CFA), an invitational under-16 football tournament held in Hohhot, Inner Mongolia, China from 28 May to 1 June 2025. It was a part of the overall 2025 Shenyang Peace Cup for youth football teams.

== Format ==
The four invited teams played a single round-robin tournament.

== Venue ==
Hohhot
Hohhot City Stadium
Capacity: 51,632

== Teams ==
- China (hosts)
- Vietnam
- Australia
- Saudi Arabia

== Standings ==
Pos	Team	Pld	W	D	L	GF	GA	GD	Pts	
1	China (C, H)	3	2	1	0	9	4	+5	7	Champions
2	Australia	3	2	0	1	6	8	−2	6	Runners-up
3	Vietnam	3	1	1	1	3	4	−1	4	Third place
4	Saudi Arabia	3	0	0	3	2	4	−2	0	Fourth place

Source: CFA
Rules for classification: 1) points; 2) goal difference; 3) goals scored; 4) head-to-head points; 5) head-to-head goal difference; 6) head-to-head number of goals scored; 7) Disciplinary points (yellow card = 1 point, red card as a result of two yellow cards = 3 points, direct red card = 3 points, yellow card followed by direct red card = 4 points).
(C) Champions; (H) Hosts

== Results ==
All match times are in local time, (UTC+8).

28 May 2025
14:00

Australia	2–1	Vietnam
Pavlovic 81'; Owusu 83'	Report	Lê Trọng Đại Nhân 45'

Hohhot City Stadium, Hohhot
Attendance: 312
Referee: Du Jianxin (China)
28 May 2025
19:35

China	2–1	Saudi Arabia
He Sifan 7'; Shuai Weihao 90+2'	Report	Abdullah 67'

Hohhot City Stadium, Hohhot
Attendance: 11,756
Referee: Zhang Lei (China)

30 May 2025
14:00

Saudi Arabia	1–2	Australia
Ayed Al-Shaheen 32'	Report	Da Cruz 25'; Oliveira 78'

Hohhot City Stadium, Hohhot
Attendance: 427
Referee: Niu Minghui (China)
30 May 2025
19:35

China	2–2	Vietnam
Liang Shiyu 12'; Wan Xiang 16'	Report	Lê Trọng Đại Nhân 47'; Le Sy Bach 84'

Hohhot City Stadium, Hohhot
Attendance: 9,234
Referee: Du Jianxin (China)

1 June 2025
14:00

Vietnam	2–1	Saudi Arabia
Lê Nguyên Quang Khôi 29'; Chu Ngọc Nguyễn Lực 82'	Report	Abdullah Al-Dawsari 24'

Hohhot City Stadium, Hohhot
Attendance: 5,645
Referee: Niu Minghui (China)
1 June 2025
19:35

China	5–2	Australia
Wan Xiang 9'; Shuai Weihao 39'; Liang Shiyu 71'; Zhang Bolin 81'; Xie Jin 85'	Report	Hassarati 2'; Li Junpeng 80' (o.g.)

Hohhot City Stadium, Hohhot
Attendance: 17,511
Referee: Zhang Lei (China)

== Top scorers ==
Rank	Player	Goals
1	(Vietnam) Lê Trọng Đại Nhân	2
1	(China) Liang Shiyu	2
1	(China) Shuai Weihao	2
1	(China) Wan Xiang	2
5	multiple players	1
