= Brunei national under-17 football team =

National association football team

Brunei Under-17
- Nickname(s): Tebuan Muda (Young Wasps)
- Association: FABD
- Confederation: AFC
- Sub-confederation: AFF
- Head coach: Ali Mustafa
- Captain: Ilyas Ilyasa Yahya
- Home stadium: Hassanal Bolkiah National Stadium
- FIFA code: BRU
First colours	Second colours

First international
- Brunei 0–2 Hong Kong (Bandar Seri Begawan, Brunei; 1 April 1988)

Biggest win
- Brunei 6–0 Mongolia (Seoul, South Korea; 27 May 2000)

Biggest defeat
- Brunei 0–19 Australia (Naypyidaw, Myanmar; 24 August 2013); Brunei 0–19 Thailand (Chonburi, Thailand; 25 October 2024)

FIFA U-17 World Cup
- Appearances: 0

AFC U-17 Asian Cup
- Appearances: 0

ASEAN U-16 Boys Championship
- Appearances: 10 (first in 2002)
- Best result: Group stage, 10 times

The Brunei national under-17 football team is the under-17 football team of Brunei and is controlled by the Football Association of Brunei Darussalam.

== International records ==
=== FIFA U-17 World Cup ===
Year	Result
(China) 1985~ (Canada) 1987	Did not enter
(Scotland) 1989	Did not qualify
(Italy) 1991~ (Ecuador) 1995	Did not enter
(Egypt) 1997	Withdrew
(New Zealand) 1999~ (Finland) 2003	Did not qualify
(Peru) 2005	Withdrew
(South Korea) 2007~ (United Arab Emirates) 2013	Did not enter
(Chile) 2015	Did not qualify
(India) 2017	Withdrew
(Brazil) 2019	Did not enter
(Indonesia) 2023~ (Qatar) 2025	Did not qualify

=== AFC U-17 Asian Cup ===
Year	Result
(Qatar) 1985~ (Qatar) 1986	Did not enter
(Thailand) 1988	Did not qualify
(United Arab Emirates) 1990~ (Qatar) 1994	Did not enter
(Thailand) 1996	Withdrew
(Qatar) 1998~ (United Arab Emirates) 2002	Did not enter
(Japan) 2004	Withdrew
(Singapore) 2006~ (Iran) 2012	Did not enter
(Thailand) 2014	Did not qualify
(India) 2016	Withdrew
(Malaysia) 2018~ (Uzbekistan) 2027	Did not qualify

=== ASEAN U-16 Boys Championship ===
AFF U-16 Youth Championship record
Year	Result	Position	GP	W	D	L	GF	GA
(Malaysia) (Indonesia) 2002	Group stage	10th	4	0	0	4	0	33
(Thailand) 2005	Did not enter							
(Vietnam) 2006	Did not enter							
(Cambodia) 2007	Group stage	9th	4	0	0	4	0	15
(Indonesia) 2008	Did not enter							
(Thailand) 2009	Cancelled							
(Indonesia) 2010	Did not enter							
(Laos) 2011	Did not enter							
(Laos) 2012	Did not enter							
(Myanmar) 2013	Group stage	10th	4	0	0	4	0	43
(Indonesia) 2014	Cancelled							
(Cambodia) 2015	Group stage	10th	5	0	1	4	3	13
(Cambodia) 2016	Group stage	10th	4	0	0	4	0	10
(Thailand) 2017	Group stage	8th	5	1	2	2	3	5
(Indonesia) 2018	Group stage	10th	4	0	0	4	3	21
(Thailand) 2019	Group stage	11th	5	0	1	4	2	23
(Indonesia) 2022	Group stage	12th	3	0	0	3	0	25
(Indonesia) 2024	Group stage	12th	3	0	0	3	1	29
(Indonesia) 2026	Group stage	12th	3	0	0	3	0	18
Total	Group stage	8th	44	1	4	39	12	235

AFF U-16 Youth Championship history
First match	Brunei 0–6 Malaysia (20 February 2002; Kuala Lumpur, Malaysia)
Biggest win	Cambodia 0–2 Brunei (16 July 2017; Chonburi, Thailand)
Biggest defeat	Brunei 0–19 Australia (24 August 2013; Naypyidaw, Myanmar)
Best result	Group stage 10 times (2002, 2007, 2013, 2015, 2016, 2017, 2018, 2019, 2022, 2024)
Worst result	—N/a

== Fixtures and results ==
2026 AFC U-17 Asian Cup qualification

22 November 2025 2026 AFC U-17 Asian Cup Q	Brunei	0–4	Sri Lanka	Chongqing, China
15:00 UTC+8			Kumara 14'; Rishad 72', 90'; Irusha 83'	Stadium: Yongchuan Sports Center; Referee: Yahya Al-Balushi (Oman)

24 November 2025 2026 AFC U-17 Asian Cup Q	Bangladesh	8–0	Brunei	Chongqing, China
14:00 UTC+8	Rahman 13', 49'; Kazi 23', 73'; Faysal 36'; Manik 37'; Arif 75'; Bostami 79'			Stadium: Yongchuan Sports Center; Referee: Naufal Adya Fairuski (Indonesia)

26 November 2025 2026 AFC U-17 Asian Cup Q	China	12–0	Brunei	Chongqing, China
19:35 UTC+8	Zhao Songyuan 11', 45+8', 45+9', 54', 58', 79'; Kuang Zhaolei 19'; Li Mingjie 39'; Wan Xiang 45+3'; Zhang Bolin 51', 63', 74'			Stadium: Tongliang Long Stadium; Attendance: 13,757; Referee: Harish Kundu (India)

28 November 2025 2026 AFC U-17 Asian Cup Q	Brunei	0–2	Timor-Leste	Chongqing, China
14:00 UTC+8			Da Silva 20'; Maia 61'	Stadium: Tongliang Long Stadium; Referee: Rashid Abdulla Hassan (United Arab Emirates)

30 November 2025 2026 AFC U-17 Asian Cup Q	Bahrain	10–0	Brunei	Chongqing, China
14:00 UTC+8	Al-Jazzaf 7', 45+2', 51', 90+2'; Zuhair 31', 36'; Omran 76'; Majed 83'; Benjemia 86' (pen.), 89'			Stadium: Tongliang Long Stadium

2026 ASEAN U-17 Boys' Championship

11 April 2026	Australia	12–0	Brunei	Sidoarjo, Indonesia
15:30 UTC+7	Hassarati 3', 35', 56', 58', 81'; O'Carroll 31'; C. Da Cruz 34', 74'; Sayon 45+1', 49'; Katrib 52'; Nurzharif 70' (o.g.)			Stadium: Gelora Delta Stadium; Referee: Alongkorn Khonwai (Thailand)

14 April 2026	Brunei	0–1	Cambodia	Sidoarjo, Indonesia
15:30 UTC+7			Kryya Ly 26'	Stadium: Gelora Delta Stadium; Referee: Thura Zaw (Myanmar)

17 April 2026	Singapore	5–0	Brunei	Gresik, Indonesia
15:30 UTC+7	Danish Irfan 30'; Aidan 39'; Lai 54'; Aryan Sahib 55'; Ayden Haziq 80'			Stadium: Gelora Joko Samudro Stadium; Referee: John Mike Basinang (Philippines)

2027 AFC U-17 Asian Cup qualification

8 November 2026 2027 AFC U-17 Asian Cup Q	Brunei	0–7	Lebanon	Salalah, Oman
20:00 UTC+6		Report	M. Mouarkech 1'; J. Al Zohbi 3'; I. Farchoukh 33'; J. Barouk 68', 81'; R. Imad 84'; W. El Awad 88' (pen.)	Stadium: Al-Saada Sports Complex; Referee: Alimardon Bainazarov (Kyrgyzstan)

11 November 2026 2027 AFC U-17 Asian Cup Q	Brunei	1–6	Bahrain	Salalah, Oman
20:00 UTC+6	Arif Syahmi 53'	Report	Tolefat 2', 25' (pen.); Majed 33'; Aldaoudi 41', 90+'	Stadium: Al-Saada Sports Complex; Referee: Trần Huy Hoàng (Vietnam)

14 November 2026 2027 AFC U-17 Asian Cup Q	Oman	10–0	Brunei	Salalah, Oman
20:00 UTC+6	Al-Hashemi 18', 56'; Al-Shamsi 25', 26', 30'; Ardhin 34'; Al-Omrani 51', 54'; Al-Jabri 59'; A. Al-Balooshi 70'	Report		Stadium: Al-Saada Sports Complex; Referee: Ali Al-Qahtani (Saudi Arabia)

17 November 2026 2027 AFC U-17 Asian Cup Q	Kuwait	6–0	Brunei	Salalah, Oman
20:00 UTC+6	Al-Dawood 56', 59', 61'; Al-Ali 62', 66'; Al-Saffar 76'	Report		Stadium: Al-Saada Sports Complex; Referee: Ali Al-Qahtani (Saudi Arabia)

== Current squad ==
Squad for the 2027 AFC U-17 Asian Cup qualification in Salalah, Oman in November 2026.

No.	Pos.	Player	Date of birth (age)	Caps	Goals	Club
1	GK	Muhsin Yusuf Idham Maswandi		2	0	(Football Association of Brunei Darussalam) BFA Brunei
18	GK	Fashya Habibie Norisawardi		3	0	(Football Association of Brunei Darussalam) Kayans
20	GK	Ary Hazim Jeffrey		0	0	(Football Association of Brunei Darussalam) Kasuka
2	DF	Hashry Fawwaz Redzuan		4	0	(Football Association of Brunei Darussalam) Kasuka
3	DF	Radin Hadizul Amin Azzatul Amin		4	0	(Football Association of Brunei Darussalam) PIP
5	DF	Edry Amsyar Mohaimin		7	0	(Football Association of Brunei Darussalam) PIP
6	DF	Danial Rahimi Sukaimy		3	0	(Football Association of Brunei Darussalam) Kayans
12	DF	Ifwat Zharfan Abdullah		0	0	(Football Association of Brunei Darussalam) DPMM
13	DF	Atqa Adaniy Helmi Syahrin		3	0	(Football Association of Brunei Darussalam) BFA Brunei
14	DF	Qhairol Zakhwan Junaidi		1	0	(Football Association of Brunei Darussalam) PIP
15	DF	Syahiran Sapolrizal		0	0	(Football Association of Brunei Darussalam) PKT
17	DF	Asrol Asyraf Shahmirol		2	0	(Football Association of Brunei Darussalam) PKT
19	DF	Zikrullah Hasbirullah Zool Hasbemi		2	0	(Football Association of Brunei Darussalam) Supastrikas
21	DF	Nur Aiman Shahrayyan Aruani		4	0	(Football Association of Brunei Darussalam) DPMM
4	MF	Rafi Syazwi Riduan		1	0	(Football Association of Brunei Darussalam) Kayans
8	MF	Fayyadh Fadillah Saiful Bahari		1	0	(Football Association of Brunei Darussalam) DPMM
9	MF	Darwish Izzat Keairol		11	0	(Football Association of Brunei Darussalam) Kasuka
10	MF	Ilyas Ilyasa Yahya		13	0	(Football Association of Brunei Darussalam) BSRC
11	MF	Shaqeel Qays Wafri Suhardi		14	0	(Football Association of Brunei Darussalam) Kasuka
23	MF	Hadi Quranul Hafiz Herman		4	0	(Football Association of Brunei Darussalam) BFA Brunei
7	FW	Arif Syahmi Abdullah		4	1	(Football Association of Brunei Darussalam) DPMM
16	FW	Ameer Abdul Muezz Amiruddin		4	0	(Football Association of Brunei Darussalam) BFA Brunei
22	FW	Syarif Ahsan Mohiddin		5	0	(Football Association of Brunei Darussalam) Dash FA

=== Recent call-ups ===
The following players have also been called up to the Brunei U17 squad in the last twelve months.

Pos.	Player	Date of birth (age)	Caps	Goals	Club	Latest call-up
GK	Ahmad Umayr As-Siddiq Noor Azman		1	0	BFA Brunei	2026 ASEAN U-17 Boys' Championship
GK	Malique Haikal Khairuddin Hamzah		0	0	(Brunei) Kasuka-PSIA	2026 ASEAN U-17 Boys' Championship
GK	Akmal Hafiy Punggut		8	0	(Brunei) DPMM	2026 ASEAN U-17 Boys' Championship
DF	Adi Idham Sazali		11	0	(Brunei) DPMM	2026 ASEAN U-17 Boys' Championship
DF	Adam Azhari Abdul Rahman		6	0	(Brunei) Falcon Sports	2026 ASEAN U-17 Boys' Championship
DF	Syahmi Wa'ie Khirol Effendi		9	0	(Brunei) Kasuka	2026 ASEAN U-17 Boys' Championship
DF	Ahmad Fadhlin Hafizin Adi Maswandy		11	0	(Brunei) Kasuka	2026 ASEAN U-17 Boys' Championship
DF	Khalish Wa'ie Azman		10	0	(Brunei) Indera	2026 ASEAN U-17 Boys' Championship
DF	Khairul Azmi Suderman		8	0	(Brunei) PIP	2026 ASEAN U-17 Boys' Championship
DF	Arif Wa'ie Yusra		4	0	(Brunei) Rimba Star	2026 ASEAN U-17 Boys' Championship
MF	Abdul Rash Aiman Nazmie Abdul Rashid		4	0	(Brunei) Rimba Star	2026 ASEAN U-17 Boys' Championship
MF	Aiman Hakeem Amirul Sabrin		1	0	BFA Brunei	2026 ASEAN U-17 Boys' Championship
MF	Nurzharif Hadri Noradli		7	0	(Brunei) Gergasi	2026 ASEAN U-17 Boys' Championship
MF	Ali Arsyad Alihan		4	0	(Brunei) DPMM	2026 AFC U-17 Asian Cup qualification
MF	Fakhrulluddin Irham Kamarul Ariffin		1	0	(Brunei) Rimba Star	2026 AFC U-17 Asian Cup qualification
FW	Hadi Danish Hamizal		2	0	(Brunei) PKT	2026 ASEAN U-17 Boys' Championship
FW	Harith Aqil Azaman		12	0	(Brunei) DPMM	2026 ASEAN U-17 Boys' Championship
FW	Arfan Dzakwan Dzulbahrin		3	0	BFA Brunei	2026 ASEAN U-17 Boys' Championship
FW	Abdul Aiman Zaffuan Abdul Al-Nadzif		1	0	(Brunei) PIP	2026 AFC U-17 Asian Cup qualification

== Former Coaches ==
- (Singapore) Stephen Ng Heng Seng
