= Zhao Songyuan =

Chinese footballer (born 2009)

Personal information
- Full name: Zhao Songyuan
- Date of birth: 7 April 2009 (age 17)
- Place of birth: Beijing, China
- Height: 1.94 m (6 ft 4 in)
- Position: Striker

Youth career
- 2021–: Tsinghua University High School

International career^{‡}
Years	Team	Apps	(Gls)
2025–	China U17	18	(20)
2026–	China	3	(0)
Medal record
Representing China
AFC U-17 Asian Cup
Runner-up	2026 Saudi Arabia
- ‡ National team caps and goals as of 21 August 2026

Zhao Songyuan (simplified Chinese: 赵松源; traditional Chinese: 趙松源; pinyin: Zhào Sōngyuán; born 7 April 2009) is a Chinese footballer who plays as a striker for the China national team.

== Early life ==
Born in Haidian, Beijing, on 7 April 2009, Zhao Songyuan's mother worked as a volleyball coach, while his father worked as a football coach. He received primary school education at Tsinghua University High School-Shangdi, and started participating in school competitions during fourth grade. However, he was often disadvantaged as he had slow pace due to his height. Football commentator Dong Lu worked as his mentor and recruited Zhao to Dong's "Chinese Football Boys" program. While continuing junior high school at Tsinghua University High School, his footballing talent was discovered by the school's Korean coaching crew, and became a starter for the team.

In September 2025, Zhao followed Beijing U16 as they won a gold medal for football at the 2025 National Games of China.

== International career ==
=== Youth ===
Zhao first entered the radar of China's national team setup at the U15 level in 2024. In November 2025, he was called up play in the 2026 AFC U-17 Asian Cup qualifiers for China U17. Making appearances in four of China's five matches, Zhao scored eleven goals as China advanced onto the final tournament. For his performances, he was recognised as one of the nominees for the 2025 Chinese U17 Golden Boy. In the 2026 AFC U-17 Asian Cup, he scored four goals in six matches as China came as runners-up in the tournament, helping China qualify for a first FIFA U-17 World Cup after a twenty-one-year absence.

In a friendly tournament in August 2026, Zhao scored two goals for China U17 against Arsenal in a 3–2 victory, followed by a goal and an assist as a substitute against Bayer Leverkusen. Arsenal head coach Adam Pilling praised Zhao's performance against them, while Bayer Leverkusen head coach Kevin Brok remarked positively on Zhao's positioning and technique.

=== Senior ===
On 24 September 2026, he made his China national team debut as a substitute against the Maldives at 17 years and 170 days, becoming the youngest men's player to earn a senior cap for China.

== Honours ==
China U17

- AFC U-17 Asian Cup runner-up: 2026

Beijing U16

- Football at the National Games of China: 2025
