= 2026 AFC U-17 Asian Cup qualification =

International football tournament

Tournament details
- Host countries: China (Group A); Kyrgyzstan (Group B); Vietnam (Group C); India (Group D); Jordan (Group E); Thailand (Group F); Myanmar (Group G)
- Dates: 22–30 November 2025
- Teams: 38 (from 1 confederation)
- Venues: 10 (in 9 host cities)

Tournament statistics
- Matches played: 85
- Goals scored: 392 (4.61 per match)

The 2026 AFC U-17 Asian Cup qualification was an international men's under-17 football competition which was being held to decide the participating teams of the 2026 AFC U-17 Asian Cup.

== Draw ==
All 47 Asian Football Confederation (AFC) member associations entered the competition. Nine teams including the hosts Saudi Arabia who qualified for the 2025 FIFA U-17 World Cup automatically qualify for the final tournament, while the other 38 teams participate in qualification.

The draw was held on 7 August 2025 at Kuala Lumpur, Malaysia at 16:00 local time (UTC+8).

The 38 teams were allocated to three groups of six teams and four groups of five teams, with teams seeded based on a points system derived from their final rankings across the previous three editions of the Finals (overall ranking shown in parentheses). A further restriction was also applied, with the seven teams serving as qualification group hosts drawn into separate groups.

Bye to the final tournament
1. **Uzbekistan**
2. **Saudi Arabia** (final tournament hosts)
3. **South Korea**
4. **North Korea**
5. **Japan**
6. **Tajikistan**
7. **United Arab Emirates**
8. **Indonesia**
9. **Qatar** (World Cup hosts)

Teams entering the qualification
	Pot 1	Pot 2	Pot 3	Pot 4	Pot 5	Pot 6
Host teams	14. **Thailand (H)**; 15. **China** **(H)**; 16. **Vietnam** **(H)**	18. **India** **(H)**	26. **Myanmar** **(H)**; 28. Kyrgyzstan **(H)**	35. Jordan **(H)**		
Remaining teams	10. **Australia**; 11. **Yemen**; 12. Iran; 13. Oman	17. Afghanistan; 19. Malaysia; 20. Bangladesh; 21. Iraq; 22. Laos; 23. Kuwait	24. Singapore; 25. Bahrain; 27. Philippines; 29. Turkmenistan; 30. Palestine	31. Syria; 32. Mongolia; 33. Cambodia; 34. Hong Kong; 36. Chinese Taipei; 37. Brunei	38. Nepal; 39. Bhutan; 40. Northern Mariana Islands; 41. Guam; 42. Maldives; 43. Timor-Leste; 44. Lebanon	45. Macau; 46. Sri Lanka; 47. Pakistan

Notes

- Teams in **bold** qualified for the final tournament.
- (H): Qualification group hosts.

== Groups ==
Tie-breaking criteria
Teams were ranked according to points (3 points for a win, 1 point for a draw, and 0 points for a loss), and if tied on points, the following tiebreaking criteria were applied, in the order given, to determine the rankings (Regulations Article 7.2):
1. Points in head-to-head matches among tied teams;
2. Goal difference in head-to-head matches among tied teams;
3. Goals scored in head-to-head matches among tied teams;
4. If more than two teams were tied, and after applying all head-to-head criteria above, a subset of teams were still tied, all head-to-head criteria above were reapplied exclusively to this subset of teams;
5. Goal difference in all group matches;
6. Goals scored in all group matches;
7. Penalty shoot-out if only two teams remain tied and they met in the last round of the group;
8. Disciplinary points (yellow card = 1 point, red card as a result of two yellow cards = 3 points, direct red card = 3 points, yellow card followed by direct red card = 4 points);
9. Drawing of lots.

=== Group A ===
- All matches were held in China.
- Times listed are UTC+8.

Pos	Team	Pld	W	D	L	GF	GA	GD	Pts	Qualification
1	China (H)	5	5	0	0	42	0	+42	15	Final tournament
2	Bangladesh	5	4	0	1	20	5	+15	12	
3	Bahrain	5	3	0	2	16	7	+9	9	
4	Timor-Leste	5	2	0	3	4	23	−19	6	
5	Sri Lanka	5	1	0	4	6	17	−11	3	
6	Brunei	5	0	0	5	0	36	−36	0	

Source: AFC
Rules for classification: Qualification tiebreakers
(H) Hosts
22 November 2025
14:00

Bangladesh	5–0	Timor-Leste
Rifat Kazi 11'; Manik 28', 43'; Bostami 50'; Ahammed 88'	Report

Tongliang Long Stadium, Chongqing
Referee: Choi Cheol-jun (Korea)
22 November 2025
15:00

Brunei	0–4	Sri Lanka
	Report	Kevinash 14'; Rishad 72', 90'; Irusha Marco 83'

Yongchuan Sports Center, Chongqing
22 November 2025
19:35

Bahrain	0–4	China
	Report	Shuai Weihao 6', 25'; Wan Xiang 27' (pen.); Zhang Bolin 90+3'

Tongliang Long Stadium, Chongqing
Attendance: 15,981
Referee: Sajëçon Zajniddinov (Tajikistan)

24 November 2025
14:00

Bangladesh	8–0	Brunei
Rahman 13', 49'; Kazi 23', 73'; Faysal 36'; Manik 37'; Arif 76'; Bostami 79'	Report

Yongchuan Sports Center, Chongqing
Referee: Naufal Adya Fairuski (Indonesia)
24 November 2025
15:00

Bahrain	2–1	Sri Lanka
Al-Jazzaf 43'; Al-Satrawi 90+9'	Report	Zaid 47'

Tongliang Long Stadium, Chongqing
Referee: Iv Tina (Cambodia)
24 November 2025
19:35

China	14–0	Timor-Leste
Zhang Bolin 6', 30'; Zhang Xuyao 17'; Xie Jin 33', 44', 64'; Shuai Weihao 36', 54', 79'; Wang Heyi 51'; Wan Xiang 59' (pen.); Zhao Songyuan 71', 77', 90'	Report

Yongchuan Sports Center, Chongqing
Attendance: 7,117
Referee: Rashid Abdulla Hassan (United Arab Emirates)

26 November 2025
14:00

Sri Lanka	0–5	Bangladesh
	Report	Islam 23'; Manik 28'; Faysal 64', 90+2'; Bostami 90'

Tongliang Long Stadium, Chongqing
Referee: Sajëçon Zajniddinov (Tajikistan)
26 November 2025
15:00

Timor-Leste	0–3	Bahrain
	Report	Al-Hassouni 26'; Saeed 45'; Al-Jazzaf 82'

Yongchuan Sports Center, Chongqing
Referee: Choi Cheol-jun (Korea)
26 November 2025
19:35

China	12–0	Brunei
Zhao Songyuan 11', 45+8', 45+9', 54', 58', 79'; Kuang Zhaolei 19'; Li Mingjie 39'; Wan Xiang 45+3'; Zhang Bolin 51', 63', 74'	Report

Tongliang Long Stadium, Chongqing
Attendance: 13,757
Referee: Harish Kundu (India)

28 November 2025
14:00

Brunei	0–2	Timor-Leste
	Report	Da Silva 20'; Maia 61'

Tongliang Long Stadium, Chongqing
28 November 2025
15:00

Bangladesh	2–1	Bahrain
Bostami 59'; Manik 73'	Report	Zuhair 87'

Yongchuan Sports Center, Chongqing
28 November 2025
19:35

Sri Lanka	0–8	China
	Report	Zhao Songyuan 13'; Zhang Xuyao 30'; Kuang Zhaolei 41'; He Sifan 47'; Shuai Weihao 55'; Wan Xiang 75', 77'; Zhang Bolin 84'

Tongliang Long Stadium, Chongqing
Attendance: 15,346
Referee: Iv Tina (Cambodia)

30 November 2025
14:00

Bahrain	10–0	Brunei
Al-Jazzaf 7', 45+2', 51', 90+2'; Zuhair 31', 36'; Omran 76'; Majed 83'; Benjemia 86' (pen.), 89'	Report

Tongliang Long Stadium, Chongqing
30 November 2025
15:00

Timor-Leste	2–1	Sri Lanka
Da Conceicao 26'; Gabriel Lay 63'	Report	Rishad 90+1'

Yongchuan Sports Center, Chongqing
30 November 2025
19:35

China	4–0	Bangladesh
Shuai Weihao 8', 38', 53'; Zhao Songyuan 89'	Report

Tongliang Long Stadium, Chongqing
Attendance: 15,291
Referee: Yahya Al-Balushi (Oman)

=== Group B ===
- All matches were held in Kyrgyzstan.
- Times listed are UTC+6.

Pos	Team	Pld	W	D	L	GF	GA	GD	Pts	Qualification
1	Yemen	5	5	0	0	24	3	+21	15	Final tournament
2	Pakistan	5	3	0	2	19	9	+10	9 (Note: Head-to-head record: Pakistan 3, Laos 3, Kyrgyzstan 3. Head-to-head goal difference: Pakistan +1, Laos 0, Kyrgyzstan –1)	
3	Laos	5	3	0	2	19	9	+10	9	
4	Kyrgyzstan (H)	5	3	0	2	16	7	+9	9	
5	Cambodia	5	1	0	4	7	15	−8	3	
6	Guam	5	0	0	5	1	43	−42	0	

Source: AFC
Rules for classification: Qualification tiebreakers
(H) Hosts
Notes:
22 November 2025
15:00

Kyrgyzstan	0–2	Yemen
	Report	Al-Nuaimi 56', 87'

Dolen Omurzakov Stadium, Bishkek
22 November 2025
15:00

Laos	8–0	Guam
Phoutphatai 14'; Sitthilath 21', 69'; Thanyavouth 36'; Odin 48', 61' (pen.); Anoulak 54'; Cazares 56' (o.g.)	Report

Dostuk Arena, Besh-Kungoy
Referee: Mohamed Jafran (Sri Lanka)
22 November 2025
19:00

Cambodia	1–3	Pakistan
Pimakara Pov 39' (pen.)	Report	Abdullah 35'; Abdul Samad 71'; Yasir 90+2'

Dolen Omurzakov Stadium, Bishkek
Referee: Ahmad Al-Khalifa (Syria)

24 November 2025
15:00

Yemen	10–0	Guam
Ahmed 2'; Tawfik 3', 36'; Ralph 8' (o.g.); Al-Fakih 42', 45+2'; S. Basheer 44'; Okamoto 77' (o.g.); Sadeq 87'; Nasser 90'	Report

Dolen Omurzakov Stadium, Bishkek
Referee: Tuan Yaasin Hanafiah (Malaysia)
24 November 2025
15:00

Laos	5–1	Cambodia
Sitthilath 26'; Phoutphatai 41'; Odin 50', 69'; Anousith 62'	Report	Pimakara Pov 43' (pen.)

Dostuk Arena, Besh-Kungoy
Attendance: 50
Referee: Mohammed Murad Al-Balushi (Oman)
24 November 2025
19:00

Kyrgyzstan	1–3	Pakistan
Ishenbaev 65'	Report	Mustafa 9'; Abdul Samad 23'; Essa 83'

Dolen Omurzakov Stadium, Bishkek
Referee: Saif Kamal Aisha (Palestine)

26 November 2025
15:00

Pakistan	1–2	Laos
Abdullah 45+1'	Report	Palindeth 9'; Odin 72' (pen.)

Dolen Omurzakov Stadium, Bishkek
Attendance: 146
Referee: Mohamed Jafran (Sri Lanka)
26 November 2025
15:00

Yemen	3–0	Cambodia
Al-Wesabi 18'; Al-Qufaili 83'; A. Basheer 90'	Report

Dostuk Arena, Besh-Kungoy
Referee: Yūsuke Ohashi (Japan)
26 November 2025
19:30

Guam	0–9	Kyrgyzstan
	Report	Kazakov 9'; Mirlanov 29', 30', 56', 61'; Alisherov 63'; Sulpiev 65'; Ishenbaev 85'; Taalaibekov 90+3'

Dolen Omurzakov Stadium, Bishkek
Referee: Layth Farhan Faraj (Iraq)

28 November 2025
15:00

Cambodia	5–1	Guam
Chantha Seyha 36', 90+6'; Be Cheaming 64'; Ly Sok Kryya 68'; Thy Vutty 76'	Report	Sokheang 64' (o.g.)

Dolen Omurzakov Stadium, Bishkek
Referee: Saif Kamal Aisha (Palestine)
28 November 2025
15:00

Pakistan	1–5	Yemen
Ahmad 71'	Report	S. Basheer 18' (pen.), 82'; Al-Wesabi 19'; Al-Fakih 25', 69'

Dostuk Arena, Besh-Kungoy
Referee: Tuan Yaasin Hanafiah (Malaysia)
28 November 2025
19:00

Laos	2–3	Kyrgyzstan
Anousith 42'; Odin 45+1'	Report	Mirlanov 19'; Grishchenko 26'; Nanthavong 90+4' (o.g.)

Dolen Omurzakov Stadium, Bishkek
Attendance: 543
Referee: Mohammed Murad Al-Balushi (Oman)

30 November 2025
15:00

Guam	0–11	Pakistan
	Report	Ullah 28', 45+2', 56'; Mehboob 32'; Abdullah 44'; Khan 67'; Abdul Samad 71', 80', 84', 90+3'; Ali 86'

Dostuk Arena, Besh-Kungoy
Referee: Ahmad Al-Khalifa (Syria)
30 November 2025
15:00

Kyrgyzstan	3–0	Cambodia
Abilov 27'; Mirlanov 89'; Abdyraev 90+2'	Report

Dolen Omurzakov Stadium, Bishkek
Referee: Layth Farhan Faraj (Iraq)
30 November 2025
19:00

Yemen	4–2	Laos
Al-Fakih 22', 81'; Al-Qufaili 65', 79'	Report	Siphanit 17' (pen.); Anousith 90+5'

Dolen Omurzakov Stadium, Bishkek
Attendance: 25
Referee: Yūsuke Ohashi (Japan)

=== Group C ===
- All matches were held in Vietnam.
- Times listed are UTC+7.

Pos	Team	Pld	W	D	L	GF	GA	GD	Pts	Qualification
1	Vietnam (H)	5	5	0	0	30	0	+30	15	Final tournament
2	Malaysia	5	4	0	1	21	5	+16	12	
3	Hong Kong	5	2	1	2	7	4	+3	7	
4	Singapore	5	1	2	2	5	11	−6	5	
5	Macau	5	1	1	3	3	12	−9	4	
6	Northern Mariana Islands	5	0	0	5	1	35	−34	0	

Source: AFC
Rules for classification: Qualification tiebreakers
(H) Hosts
22 November 2025
16:00

Hong Kong	2–0	Macau
Eden Tung 18'; Sean Wong 58'	Report

Vietnam YFTC Field No. 3, Hanoi
Referee: Ismaeel Fazal (Pakistan)
22 November 2025
19:00

Singapore	0–6	Vietnam
	Report	Lê Trọng Đại Nhân 4' (pen.); Lê Sỹ Bách 25'; Nguyễn Minh Thủy 38'; Chu Ngọc Nguyễn Lực 64'; Trần Mạnh Quân 69' (pen.), 89'

PVF Stadium, Hưng Yên
Referee: Clifford Daypuyat (Philippines)
22 November 2025
19:00

Malaysia	13–0	Northern Mariana Islands
Iman Danish 5', 16', 20'; Nabil Ikhwan 32'; Iman Irfan 34'; Arfan Haziq 40', 54', 90'; Arayyan Hakeem 45'; Alif Ashraf 50'; Nurikhwan Hazeem 59'; Navarro 65' (o.g.); Fahim Akmal 82'	Report

Vietnam YFTC Field No. 3, Hanoi
Referee: Seo Dong-hwan (South Korea)

24 November 2025
16:00

Malaysia	1–0	Hong Kong
Iman Danish 65'	Report

Vietnam YFTC Field No. 3, Hanoi
Referee: Saleh Al-Ghamdi (Saudi Arabia)
24 November 2025
19:00

Singapore	1–1	Macau
Zharfan 89'	Report	Chan U Chit 40'

Vietnam YFTC Field No. 3, Hanoi
Referee: Daniel Cook (Australia)
24 November 2025
19:00

Vietnam	14–0	Northern Mariana Islands
Trần Mạnh Quân 1', 16'; Nguyễn Văn Dương 21' (pen.), 23'; Chu Ngọc Nguyễn Lực 33'; Nguyễn Minh Thủy 35'; Trần Hoàng Việt 47'; Nguyễn Mạnh Cường 54'; Triệu Đình Vỹ 58'; Đào Quý Vương 74'; Trần Ngọc Sơn 75', 90+2'; Lê Trọng Đại Nhân 79', 81'	Report

PVF Stadium, Hưng Yên
Referee: Rustam Choriev (Uzbekistan)

26 November 2025
16:00

Northern Mariana Islands	1–2	Singapore
Tagabuel 19'	Report	Eszouan 16'; Raoul 89'

Vietnam YFTC Field No. 3, Hanoi
Referee: Ismaeel Fazal (Pakistan)
26 November 2025
19:00

Vietnam	2–0	Hong Kong
Nguyễn Minh Thủy 10'; Nguyễn Mạnh Cường 70'	Report

PVF Stadium, Hưng Yên
Referee: Clifford Daypuyat (Philippines)
26 November 2025
19:00

Macau	0–5	Malaysia
	Report	Alif Ashraf 39', 40', 49'; Iman Danish 86', 90+3'

Vietnam YFTC Field No. 3, Hanoi
Referee: Afsheen Naseer (Maldives)

28 November 2025
16:00

Malaysia	2–1	Singapore
Iman Danish 5'; Arayyan Hakeem 43'	Report	Aaryan 75'

Vietnam YFTC Field No. 3, Hanoi
Referee: Seo Dong-hwan (South Korea)
28 November 2025
19:00

Macau	0–4	Vietnam
	Report	Triệu Đình Vỹ 8'; Trần Mạnh Quân 21'; Trần Ngọc Sơn 33'; Trương Nguyễn Duy Khang 37'

PVF Stadium, Hưng Yên
Referee: Saleh Al-Ghamdi (Saudi Arabia)
28 November 2025
19:00

Hong Kong	4–0	Northern Mariana Islands
Sephrey Ma 5'; Leung 54'; Eden Tung 65'; Lam 88'	Report

Vietnam YFTC Field No. 3, Hanoi
Referee: Daniel Cook (Australia)

30 November 2025
16:00

Northern Mariana Islands	0–2	Macau
	Report	Leong Hou Teng 47'; Ng Kuan Hou 54'

Vietnam YFTC Field No. 3, Hanoi
Referee: Afsheen Naseer (Maldives)
30 November 2025
19:00

Vietnam	4–0	Malaysia
Nguyễn Mạnh Cường 4'; Nguyễn Ngọc Anh Hào 44'; Nguyễn Văn Dương 50'; Lê Sỹ Bách 77'	Report

PVF Stadium, Hưng Yên
Referee: Clifford Daypuyat (Philippines)
30 November 2025
19:00

Singapore	1–1	Hong Kong
Zharfan 73'	Report	Nigel Lau 7'

Vietnam YFTC Field No. 3, Hanoi
Referee: Rustam Choriev (Uzbekistan)

=== Group D ===
- All matches were held in India.
- Times listed are UTC+5:30.

Pos	Team	Pld	W	D	L	GF	GA	GD	Pts	Qualification
1	India (H)	4	2	1	1	6	5	+1	7 (Note: Head-to-head points: India 3, Iran 0)	Final tournament
2	Iran	4	2	1	1	10	4	+6	7	
3	Lebanon	4	1	3	0	4	2	+2	6	
4	Palestine	4	1	2	1	6	6	0	5	
5	Chinese Taipei	4	0	1	3	2	11	−9	1	

Source: AFC
Rules for classification: Qualification tiebreakers
(H) Hosts
Notes:
22 November 2025
16:30

Lebanon	0–0	Chinese Taipei
	Report

EKA Arena, Ahmedabad
Referee: Huseen Jamal (Kuwait)
22 November 2025
19:30

Palestine	1–1	India
Jomah 74'	Report	Poonia 44'

EKA Arena, Ahmedabad
Attendance: 4,200
Referee: Resul Mämmedow (Turkmenistan)

24 November 2025
16:30

Chinese Taipei	0–5	Iran
	Report	Gao Yu-zhu 45' (o.g.); Valipoor 52'; Asadi 54'; Ghasemi 83'; Beheshti 90+1'

EKA Arena, Ahmedabad
Referee: Mohammad Ghabayen (Jordan)
24 November 2025
19:30

Lebanon	1–1	Palestine
Maleb 81'	Report	Amireh 14'

EKA Arena, Ahmedabad

26 November 2025
16:30

Iran	1–1	Lebanon
Asadi 14'	Report	Eid 65'

EKA Arena, Ahmedabad
Referee: Huseen Jamal (Kuwait)
26 November 2025
19:30

India	3–1	Chinese Taipei
Gangte 32', 77', 79'	Report	Yang Hao-wei 4'

EKA Arena, Ahmedabad
Attendance: 3,285
Referee: Mohamed Rashed Ismaeel (Bahrain)

28 November 2025
16:30

Palestine	1–3	Iran
Kafafi 43'	Report	Asadi 49', 68'; Beheshti 72'

EKA Arena, Ahmedabad
28 November 2025
19:30

India	0–2	Lebanon
	Report	Assaf 26'; Maakaroun 37'

EKA Arena, Ahmedabad
Attendance: 2,638
Referee: Wissam Rabie (Syria)

30 November 2025
16:30

Chinese Taipei	1–3	Palestine
Quan Shi-xuan 52'	Report	Khalifah 33'; Kafafi 76'; Jamhour 88'

EKA Arena, Ahmedabad
Referee: Huseen Jamal (Kuwait)
30 November 2025
19:30

Iran	1–2	India
Valipoor 19'	Report	Gangte 45+1' (pen.); Wangkheirakpam 52'

EKA Arena, Ahmedabad
Attendance: 4,928
Referee: Mohammad Mofeed (Jordan)

=== Group E ===
- All matches were held in Jordan.
- Times listed are UTC+3.

Pos	Team	Pld	W	D	L	GF	GA	GD	Pts	Qualification
1	Australia	4	3	1	0	13	3	+10	10	Final tournament
2	Iraq	4	2	2	0	9	7	+2	8	
3	Jordan (H)	4	2	1	1	13	4	+9	7	
4	Bhutan	4	0	1	3	0	9	−9	1	
5	Philippines	4	0	1	3	3	15	−12	1	

Source: AFC
Rules for classification: Qualification tiebreakers
(H) Hosts
22 November 2025
16:00

Bhutan	0–5	Jordan
	Report	Al-Jawhari 7'; Al-Rabie 42'; Al-Malahi 65'; Abu Saad 89'; Bakkar 90+3'

Al-Aqaba Stadium, Aqaba
22 November 2025
19:00

Philippines	2–3	Iraq
Long 26'; Binalong 51'	Report	Hareb 21', 76'; Erailbi 41'

Al-Aqaba Stadium, Aqaba

24 November 2025
16:00

Jordan	0–1	Australia
	Report	Court 54'

Al-Aqaba Stadium, Aqaba
Referee: Baraa El Hayek (Lebanon)
24 November 2025
19:00

Bhutan	0–0	Philippines
	Report

Al-Aqaba Stadium, Aqaba

26 November 2025
16:00

Iraq	2–2	Jordan
Hayder 54' (pen.); Altalebi 75'	Report	Al-Rabie 49'; Elayan 85'

Al-Aqaba Stadium, Aqaba
26 November 2025
19:00

Australia	3–0	Bhutan
Olukhale 47'; Reid 52'; Becvinovski 75'	Report

Al-Aqaba Stadium, Aqaba
Referee: Akobirkhuja Shukurullaev (Uzbekistan)

28 November 2025
16:00

Philippines	0–6	Australia
	Report	Hassarati 4', 23', 60', 76'; Oliveira 6'; Shah 90'

Al-Aqaba Stadium, Aqaba
Referee: Ammar Abo Alo (Syria)
28 November 2025
19:00

Iraq	1–0	Bhutan
Hareb 87'	Report

Al-Aqaba Stadium, Aqaba
Referee: Baraa El Hayek (Lebanon)

30 November 2025
16:00

Jordan	6–1	Philippines
Al-Jawhari 21'; Abu Dehim 43', 70'; Abu Saad 73'; Al-Malahi 74', 90+2'	Report	Long 86'

Al-Aqaba Stadium, Aqaba
30 November 2025
19:00

Australia	3–3	Iraq
Court 30' (pen.), 36'; Becvinovski 74'	Report	Al-Nasari 48'; Hayder 61', 69'

Al-Aqaba Stadium, Aqaba

=== Group F ===
- All matches were held in Thailand.
- Times listed are UTC+7.

Pos	Team	Pld	W	D	L	GF	GA	GD	Pts	Qualification
1	Thailand (H)	4	3	0	1	16	4	+12	9 (Note: Head-to-head points: Thailand 3, Turkmenistan 3, Kuwait 3. Head-to-head goal difference: Thailand +2, Turkmenistan 0, Kuwait –2)	Final tournament
2	Turkmenistan	4	3	0	1	15	5	+10	9	
3	Kuwait	4	3	0	1	11	3	+8	9	
4	Mongolia	4	1	0	3	3	15	−12	3	
5	Maldives	4	0	0	4	1	19	−18	0	

Source: AFC
Rules for classification: Qualification tiebreakers
(H) Hosts
Notes:
22 November 2025
15:30

Turkmenistan	0–1	Kuwait
	Report	Redha 90+3'

Chonburi Stadium, Chonburi
Referee: Ali Reda (Lebanon)
22 November 2025
19:30

Maldives	0–1	Mongolia
	Report	Hakeem 45+2' (o.g.)

Chonburi Stadium, Chonburi
Referee: Muath Owfi (Palestine)

24 November 2025
15:30

Maldives	0–6	Turkmenistan
	Report	Muhammetmyradov 8'; Zhumaniyazov 38'; Govshudov 52'; Meredov 60'; Shamyradov 76', 90'

Chonburi Stadium, Chonburi
Referee: Nghiêm Bá Trí (Vietnam)
24 November 2025
19:30

Mongolia	0–4	Thailand
	Report	Phonphithak 35' (pen.), 70'; Pichaya 53'; Phasutha 90+4'

Chonburi Stadium, Chonburi
Referee: Yousef Al-Sharshani (Qatar)

26 November 2025
15:30

Kuwait	5–0	Mongolia
Al-Maraghi 7'; Al-Azemi 32'; Al-Ateeqi 36', 53'; Al-Enezi 90+1'	Report

Chonburi Stadium, Chonburi
Referee: Muath Owfi (Palestine)
26 November 2025
19:30

Thailand	7–1	Maldives
Sutthipong 19'; Phasutha 26'; Achirawat 34', 56'; Pakorn 53'; Achirawit 82'; Pitchaya 89'	Report	Jaweez 79'

Chonburi Stadium, Chonburi
Referee: Ahmad Al-Khawaldeh (Jordan)

28 November 2025
15:30

Kuwait	5–0	Maldives
Al-Mutairi 10'; Al-Ateeqi 34'; Al-Khajee 45+4', 83'; Al-Dawood 86'	Report

Chonburi Stadium, Chonburi
Referee: Nghiêm Bá Trí (Vietnam)
28 November 2025
19:30

Turkmenistan	3–2	Thailand
Govshudov 14'; Meredov 24', 62'	Report	Pichaya 65'; Pakorn 72'

Chonburi Stadium, Chonburi
Referee: Yousef Al-Sharshani (Qatar)

30 November 2025
15:30

Mongolia	2–6	Turkmenistan
Munkh-Orgil 16'; Khanbileg 90' (pen.)	Report	Temuun 22' (o.g.); Meredov 34', 47'; Govshudov 49'; Ovezmyradov 75'; Garid 77' (o.g.)

Chonburi Stadium, Chonburi
Referee: Ahmad Al-Khawaldeh (Jordan)
30 November 2025
19:30

Thailand	3–0	Kuwait
Phonphithak 10'; Pichaya 44'; Achirawat 57'	Report

Chonburi Stadium, Chonburi
Referee: Ali Reda (Lebanon)

=== Group G ===
- All matches were held in Myanmar.
- Times listed are UTC+6:30.

Pos	Team	Pld	W	D	L	GF	GA	GD	Pts	Qualification
1	Myanmar (H)	4	3	1	0	11	3	+8	10	Final tournament
2	Oman	4	3	0	1	12	3	+9	9	
3	Syria	4	2	1	1	10	8	+2	7	
4	Afghanistan	4	1	0	3	4	10	−6	3	
5	Nepal	4	0	0	4	2	15	−13	0	

Source: AFC
Rules for classification: Qualification tiebreakers
(H) Hosts
22 November 2025
16:00

Myanmar	3–1	Afghanistan
Myo Khant Kyaw 33'; Ye Naing Aung 47'; Sai Myat Min 59' (pen.)	Report	Noorzahi 74'

Thuwunna Stadium, Yangon
Referee: Sashanka Madushanka (Sri Lanka)
22 November 2025
19:00

Nepal	2–4	Syria
Shrestha 54', 70'	Report	Al-Hariri 7'; Al-Jasem 10'; Al-Fashtaki 14'; Al-Faraj 89' (pen.)

Thuwunna Stadium, Yangon
Referee: Dawoud Alabdullah (Kuwait)

24 November 2025
16:00

Nepal	0–4	Myanmar
	Report	Naing Aung Ye 13'; Aung Thi Ha 69'; Myo Khant Kyaw 81'; Win Min Thant 83'

Thuwunna Stadium, Yangon
Referee: Alongkorn Khonwai (Thailand)
24 November 2025
19:00

Syria	1–3	Oman
Al-Jasem 65'	Report	Khamis 21' (pen.); Hamoud 48' (o.g.); Al-Shamsi 66'

Thuwunna Stadium, Yangon
Referee: Marwan Al-Ismail (Jordan)

26 November 2025
16:00

Oman	5–0	Nepal
Karki 10' (o.g.); Al-Ghassani 19'; Al-Mamari 39'; Al-Shamsi 73'; Al-Hinai 87'	Report

Thuwunna Stadium, Yangon
Referee: Taha Kobeisse (Lebanon)
26 November 2025
19:00

Afghanistan	1–3	Syria
Noorzahi 90+3'	Report	Al-Hariri 9'; Al-Faraj 28'; Al-Sharie 63'

Thuwunna Stadium, Yangon
Referee: Alongkorn Khonwai (Thailand)

28 November 2025
16:00

Myanmar	2–0	Oman
Aung Thi Ha 64'; Nyi Nyi Thant 67'	Report

Thuwunna Stadium, Yangon
Referee: Dawoud Alabdullah (Kuwait)
28 November 2025
19:00

Afghanistan	2–0	Nepal
M. Ali 24'; Noorzahi 67'	Report

Thuwunna Stadium, Yangon
Referee: Taha Kobeisse (Lebanon)

30 November 2025
16:00

Syria	2–2	Myanmar
Al-Faraj 15'; Bakour 86'	Report	Nyi Nyi Thant 10'; Ant Htoo Paing 35'

Thuwunna Stadium, Yangon
Referee: Marwan Al-Ismail (Jordan)
30 November 2025
19:00

Oman	4–0	Afghanistan
Al-Sadi 45+1'; Al-Ghassani 60', 64'; Al-Hashim 85'	Report

Thuwunna Stadium, Yangon
Referee: Sashanka Madushanka (Sri Lanka)

== Qualified teams ==
The following 16 teams qualified for the final tournament.

Team	Qualified as	Appearance	Previous best performance^{1}
Saudi Arabia	Hosts and 2025 runners-up	13th	Champions (1985, 1988)
Qatar	World Cup Hosts	12th	Champions (1990)
Uzbekistan	2025 champions	12th	Champions (2012, 2025)
South Korea	2025 semi-finalist	17th	Champions (1986, 2002)
North Korea	2025 semi-finalist	13th	Champions (2010, 2014)
Japan	2025 quarter-finalist	18th	Champions (1994, 2006, 2018, 2023)
Indonesia	2025 quarter-finalist	8th	Fourth place (1990)
United Arab Emirates	2025 quarter-finalist	9th	Runners-up (1990)
Tajikistan	2025 quarter-finalist	6th	Runners-up (2018)
China	Group A winners	17th	Champions (1992, 2004)
Yemen	Group B winners	9th	Runners-up (2002)
Vietnam	Group C winners	10th	Fourth place (2000)
India	Group D winners	10th	Quarter-final (2002, 2018)
Australia	Group E winners	9th	Semi-final (2010, 2014, 2018)
Thailand	Group F winners	14th	Champions (1998)
Myanmar	Group G winners	5th	Group stage (1986, 2000, 2002, 2006)

^{1}Italic indicates hosts for that year.

== See also ==
- 2026 AFC U-17 Asian Cup
- 2026 AFC U-23 Asian Cup qualification
- 2026 AFC Women's Asian Cup qualification
- 2026 AFC U-17 Women's Asian Cup qualification
- 2026 AFC U-20 Women's Asian Cup qualification
