= China national under-17 football team =

National association football team

China U-17
- Association: Chinese Football Association
- Confederation: AFC (Asia)
- Sub-confederation: EAFF (East Asia)
- Head coach: Bin Ukishima ('09 team); Zhang Yaokun ('10 team); Zhou Haibin ('11 team)
- FIFA code: CHN
First colours	Second colours

AFC U-17 Asian Cup
- Appearances: 16 (first in 1985)
- Best result: Champions (1992, 2004)

FIFA U-17 World Cup
- Appearances: 6 (first in 1985)
- Best result: Quarter-finals (1985, 2005)

The China national under-17 football team, also known as the China Junior Team (国少队), represents the People's Republic of China in international football competitions in the FIFA U-17 World Cup and the AFC U-17 Asian Cup, as well as any other under-17 international football tournaments. It is governed by the Football Association of the People's Republic of China.

== Recent results and fixtures ==
The following is a list of match results in the last 12 months, as well as any future matches that have been scheduled.

Legend

Win Draw Loss Fixture

=== 2025 ===
==== U-16 ====
22 November 2026 AFC U-17 Asian Cup Q	Bahrain	0-4	China	Chongqing, China
19:35		Report	Shuai Weihao 6', 25'; Wan Xiang 27' (pen.); Zhang Bolin 90+3'	Stadium: Tongliang Long Stadium; Attendance: 15,981; Referee: Sajëçon Zajniddinov (Tajikistan)

24 November 2026 AFC U-17 Asian Cup Q	China	14-0	Timor-Leste	Chongqing, China
19:35	Zhang Bolin 6', 30'; Zhang Xuyao 17'; Xie Jin 33', 44', 64'; Shuai Weihao 36', 54', 79'; Wang Heyi 51'; Wan Xiang 59' (pen.); Zhao Songyuan 71', 77', 90'	Report		Stadium: Yongchuan Sports Center; Attendance: 7,117; Referee: Rashid Abdulla Hassan (United Arab Emirates)

26 November 2026 AFC U-17 Asian Cup Q	China	12-0	Brunei	Chongqing, China
19:35	Zhao Songyuan 11', 45+8', 45+9', 54', 58', 79'; Kuang Zhaolei 19'; Li Mingjie 39'; Wan Xiang 45+3'; Zhang Bolin 51', 63', 74'	Report		Stadium: Tongliang Long Stadium; Attendance: 13,757; Referee: Harish Kundu (India)

28 November 2026 AFC U-17 Asian Cup Q	Sri Lanka	0-8	China	Chongqing, China
19:35		Report	Zhao Songyuan 13'; Zhang Xuyao 30'; Kuang Zhaolei 41'; He Sifan 47'; Shuai Weihao 55'; Wan Xiang 75', 77'; Zhang Bolin 84'	Stadium: Tongliang Long Stadium; Attendance: 15,346; Referee: Iv Tina (Cambodia)

30 November 2026 AFC U-17 Asian Cup Q	China	4-0	Bangladesh	Chongqing, China
19:35	Shuai Weihao 8', 38', 53'; Zhao Songyuan 89'	Report		Stadium: Tongliang Long Stadium; Attendance: 15,291; Referee: Yahya Al-Balushi (Oman)

==== U-15 ====
18 December EAFF U-15 Championship	China	0–3	Japan	Zhangzhou, China
15:00		Report	Eita Sawaguchi 34'; Soma Iida 50'; Ren Isobe 55'	Stadium: Hooray International Football Training Base Stadium; Referee: Bai Qitao (China)

20 December EAFF U-15 Championship	South Korea	1–1	China	Zhangzhou, China
15:00	Choi Junhyeok 43'	Report	Pan Chaowei 27' (pen.)	Stadium: Hooray International Football Training Base Stadium; Referee: Zhang Yihao (China)

22 December EAFF U-15 Championship	China	3-0	Hong Kong	Zhangzhou, China
15:00	Sheng Chenxi 28'; Ke Bowen 60'; Ji Zhenghao 70+4'	Report		Stadium: Hooray International Football Training Base Stadium; Referee: Peng Yuyang (China)

=== 2026 ===
==== U-17 ====
30 January Friendly	China	1–2	Uzbekistan	Shenzhen, China
18:00	Zhang Xuyao 16'		Abduraimov 27'; Salomov 85'	Stadium: Shenzhen Youth Football Training Base Centre Stadium; Referee: Zhang Chao (China)

2 February Friendly	China	2–0	Uzbekistan	Shenzhen, China
18:00	Zhao Songyuan 16'; Zhang Bolin 72'			Stadium: Shenzhen Youth Football Training Base Pitch No.1; Referee: Gan Shuran (China)

8 February Friendly	Indonesia	0–7	China	Tangerang, Indonesia
21:00 UTC+7			Zhao Songyuan 16', 42'; Wang Heyi 25'; Shuai Weihao 44', 53'; Zhang Bolin 74'; Ailikamu Yilihong 90+1'	Stadium: Indomilk Arena; Referee: Songkran Bunmeekiart (Thailand)

11 February Friendly	Indonesia	2–3	China	Tangerang, Indonesia
18:30 UTC+7	Chico Jericho 22'; Miraj Rizky 49' (pen.)		Zhao Songyuan 9'; He Sifan 37'; Noah Duvert 90+4' (o.g.)	Stadium: Indomilk Arena; Referee: Cllifford Daypuyat (Philippine)

21 March Friendly	China	2–0	Tajikistan	Zhaoqing, China
19:00 UTC+8	Kuang Zhaolei 31'; Xie Jin 86'			Stadium: Zhaoqing New District Sports Center Stadium; Referee: Gan Shuran (China)

24 March Friendly	China	0–0	Tajikistan	Zhaoqing, China
18:00 UTC+8				Stadium: Zhaoqing New District Sports Center Stadium; Referee: Gan Shuran (China)

5 May 2026 AFC U-17 Asian Cup GS	Indonesia	1–0	China	Jeddah, Saudi Arabia
19:30 UTC+3	Keanu Senjaya 87'	Report		Stadium: King Abdullah Sports City Training Stadium (Pitch A); Attendance: 330; Referee: Abdullah Al-Shehri (Saudi Arabia)

9 May 2026 AFC U-17 Asian Cup GS	China	1–2	Japan	Jeddah, Saudi Arabia
19:00 UTC+3	Zhao Songyuan 48'	Report	Anthony Motosuna 37'; Maki Kitahara 60'	Stadium: King Abdullah Sports City Training Stadium (Pitch C); Attendance: 200; Referee: Sultan Al-Hammadi (United Arab Emirates)

12 May 2026 AFC U-17 Asian Cup GS	China	2–0	Qatar	Jeddah, Saudi Arabia
19:00 UTC+3	He Sifan 14'; Zhang Bolin 71'	Report		Stadium: King Abdullah Sports City Training Stadium (Pitch C); Attendance: 200; Referee: Adam Kersey (Australia)

15 May 2026 AFC U-17 Asian Cup QF	Saudi Arabia	1–3	China	Jeddah, Saudi Arabia
20:00 UTC+3	Bayomi 21'	Report	Wan Xiang 27'; Zhao Songyuan 59'; He Sifan 90+2'	Stadium: King Abdullah Sports City Training Stadium (Pitch A); Attendance: 306; Referee: Akobir Shukurullaev (Uzbekistan)

19 May 2026 AFC U-17 Asian Cup SF	China	2–0	Australia	Jeddah, Saudi Arabia
21:30 UTC+3	Shuai Weihao 48'; Xie Jin 90'	Report		Stadium: King Abdullah Sports City Hall Stadium; Attendance: 306; Referee: Abdullah Al-Shehri (Saudi Arabia)

22 May 2026 AFC U-17 Asian Cup Final	China	2–3	Japan	Jeddah, Saudi Arabia
20:00 UTC+3	Wan Xiang 48'; Zhao Songyuan 79' (pen.)	Report	Tafuku Satomi 31'; Kakeru Saito 42'; Maki Kitahara 45+2'	Stadium: King Abdullah Sports City Hall Stadium; Attendance: 495; Referee: Sultan Al-Hammadi (United Arab Emirates)

5 July Yinchuan Tournament	China	3–0	Australia	Yinchuan, China
19:35 UTC+8	Shuai Weihao 5'; Zhao Songyuan 53'; Sun Chenxi 88'	Report		Stadium: Helan Mountain Stadium; Attendance: 26,836; Referee: Du Jianxin (China)

8 July Yinchuan Tournament	China	0–2	Tanzania	Yinchuan, China
19:35 UTC+8		Report	Kizinga 45+1'; Athanasi 90+3'	Stadium: Helan Mountain Stadium; Attendance: 23,356; Referee: Maimaitijiang (China)

11 July Yinchuan Tournament	China	1–1	Nigeria	Yinchuan, China
19:35 UTC+8	Zhang Junhao 27'	Report	Samuel 11'	Stadium: Helan Mountain Stadium; Attendance: 19,265; Referee: Du Jianxin (China)

3 August Shanghai Future Star Cup	China	3–2	(England) Arsenal U-17	Shanghai, China
19:35 UTC+8	Zhao Songyuan 23', 41'; Cheng Shenghan 90+7'	Report	Oba 53'; Nwaneri 69'	Stadium: Pudong Football Stadium; Attendance: 9,328; Referee: István Kovács (Romania)

4 August Shanghai Future Star Cup	Athletic U-17 (Spain)	0–1	China	Shanghai, China
16:00 UTC+8		Report	Cheng Shenghan 14'	Stadium: Pudong Football Stadium South Training Pitch; Referee: Wang Jian (China)

6 August Shanghai Future Star Cup	China	2–1	(Germany) Leverkusen U-17	Shanghai, China
19:35 UTC+8	Kong Xinuo 61'; Zhao Songyuan 62'	Report	Mohammadi 36'	Stadium: Yuanshen Sports Centre Stadium; Attendance: 4,122; Referee: Wang Minjie (China)

7 August Shanghai Future Star Cup	China	0–0 (3–1 p)	(Argentina) River Plate U-17	Shanghai, China
19:35 UTC+8		Report		Stadium: Pudong Football Stadium North Training Pitch; Attendance: 60; Referee: Wang Jian (China)
	Penalties
	Zhao Songyuan (penalty scored); Pan Chaowei (penalty scored); Zhang Xuyao (penalty scored); Li Jiarun (penalty missed)		(penalty missed) Fernandez; (penalty missed) Amor; (penalty scored) Cabral; (penalty missed) Suljic

1 October Vertex Cup London 2026	China	0–1	Tanzania	London, United Kingdom
17:30 UTC+1		Report	Mbalasalu 83'	Stadium: The SkyEx Community Stadium; Referee: Oliver Mackey (England)

4 October Vertex Cup London 2026	Mexico	3–0	China	London, United Kingdom
14:00 UTC+1	Lugo 20', 55' (pen.); Cisneros 90+2'	Report		Stadium: The SkyEx Community Stadium; Referee: Harry Wager (England)

7 October Vertex Cup London 2026	Argentina	3–0	China	London, United Kingdom
11:00 UTC+1	Goytia 4'; Alcaraz 45+2' (pen.); Barrionuevo 74'	Report		Stadium: The SkyEx Community Stadium; Referee: Adam Merchant (England)

20 November 2026 FIFA U-17 World Cup	Spain	5–0	China	Al Rayyan, Qatar
17:00 UTC+3	Pesquer 40' (pen.); Tunkara 45+2'; Emeka 73', 79'; Trujillano 85'	Report		Stadium: Aspire Zone Pitch 5 Referee: Mathias de Armas (Uruguay)

23 November 2026 FIFA U-17 World Cup	Morocco	v	China	Al Rayyan, Qatar
18:00 UTC+3		Report		Stadium: Aspire Zone Pitch 2

26 November 2026 FIFA U-17 World Cup	China	v	Fiji	Al Rayyan, Qatar
18:00 UTC+3		Report		Stadium: Aspire Zone Pitch 3

==== U-16 ====
3 February Friendly	China	0–3	Uzbekistan	Zhangzhou, China
15:00 UTC+8			Khayrullaev 35'; Uktamov 69'; Kholmamato 90+1'	Stadium: Hooray International Football Training Base Pitch A01; Referee: Wan Tao (China)

6 February Friendly	China	2–0	Uzbekistan	Zhangzhou, China
15:00 UTC+8	Li Youan 20'; Li Yuxuan 71'			Stadium: Hooray International Football Training Base Pitch A01; Referee: Xu Qiangqiang (China)

31 March Montaigu Tournament	France	4–1	China	Montaigu-Vendée, France
18:30 UTC+1	Torres 5', 30'; Kharbouch 28'; Diallo 74'		Wu Bile 44'	Stadium: Stade Maxime Bossis Montaigu; Referee: Sebastian Henry (France)

2 April Montaigu Tournament	Brazil	1–0	China	Les Sables-d'Olonne, France
18:30 UTC+1	Ferreira 28'			Stadium: Parc des Sports de la Rudelière

4 April Montaigu Tournament	Ivory Coast	1–0	China	Les Sables-d'Olonne, France
18:30 UTC+1	Abbas 72'			Stadium: Parc des Sports de la Rudelière; Referee: Nathan Saudemont (France)

6 April Montaigu Tournament	China	1–0	Peru	Les Sables-d'Olonne, France
10:30 UTC+1	Liu Kaiyuan 27'			Stadium: Parc des Sports de la Rudelière; Referee: Jerome Moustey (France)

10 May Hohhot Tournament	China	1–0	Uzbekistan	Hohhot, China
14:00 UTC+8	Ji Zhenghao 80' (pen.)	Report		Stadium: Northern Football Training Base; Attendance: 4,132; Referee: He Kai (China)

13 May Hohhot Tournament	China	3–2	Tajikistan	Hohhot, China
19:35 UTC+8	Yuan Bohan 35' (pen.); Yang Chenshuo 47'; Peng Xiran 62'	Report	Hojiev 24'; Khalimov 50'	Stadium: Northern Football Training Base; Attendance: 2,954; Referee: Liu Zhao (China)

16 May Hohhot Tournament	China	4–2	South Korea	Hohhot, China
14:00 UTC+8	Wu Bile 1', 38'; Yuan Bohan 68' (pen.); Li Jiajin 90+1'	Report	Lim Ji-seong 6' (pen.); Chimara Justin 90+3'	Stadium: Northern Football Training Base; Attendance: 4,754; Referee: Ai Kun (China)

24 September Peace Cup	China	3–3	Kyrgyzstan	Shenyang, China
19:35 UTC+8	Zhang Shuhang 6'; Yang Yihuan 53'; Wu Bile 75'	Report	Alimzhanov 14'; Khodzhaev 79'; Arynov 85'	Stadium: Shenhe District Cultural and Sports Center Stadium; Attendance: 2,369; Referee: Qiu Zhaojun (China)

27 September Peace Cup	China	1–0	Vietnam	Shenyang, China
14:00 UTC+8	Ji Zhenghao 58'	Report		Stadium: Shenhe District Cultural and Sports Center Stadium; Attendance: 2,180; Referee: Dai Yige (China)

30 September Peace Cup	China	0–1	Australia	Shenyang, China
19:35 UTC+8		Report	Harrison 13'	Stadium: Shenhe District Cultural and Sports Center Stadium; Attendance: 3,652; Referee: Ren Tong (China)

16 October U-17 Gulf Cup	Qatar	0–2	China	Doha, Qatar
17:45 UTC+3		Report	Yuan Bohan 4'; Liu Yuyang 37'	Stadium: Grand Hamad Stadium; Referee: Ali Al-Qahtani (Saudi Arabia)

19 October U-17 Gulf Cup	China	2–1	Oman	Doha, Qatar
20:00 UTC+3	Al-Massoud 90+1'	Report	Liu Kaiyuan 41' (pen.); Peng Xianchen 45'	Stadium: Hamad bin Khalifa Stadium; Referee: Abdullah Zarban (Saudi Arabia)

22 October U-17 Gulf Cup	China	3–3	Bahrain	Al Wakrah, Qatar
20:00 UTC+3	Yang Yihuan 29'; Liu Jinglei 45'; Yang Chenshuo 62'	Report	Zuhair 20', 70', 80' (pen.)	Stadium: Saoud bin Abdulrahman Stadium; Referee: Mohammed Ba-Saleh (Yemen)

25 October U-17 Gulf Cup	United Arab Emirates	1–0	China	Doha, Qatar
20:00 UTC+3	Al-Blooshi 4'	Report		Stadium: Hamad bin Khalifa Stadium

1 November U-17 Gulf Cup	Egypt	4–0	China	Doha, Qatar
21:15 UTC+3	Al-Blooshi 11', 36'; Mousa 90'; Attia 90+3' (pen.)	Report		Stadium: Hamad bin Khalifa Stadium

==== U-15 ====
25 April Torneo delle Nazioni	Slovenia	2–1	China	Nova Gorica, Slovenia
17:00 UTC+1	Zvegla Noel 6'; Mesanovic Emin 16'	Report	Tang Huajian 48' (pen.)	Stadium: Športni park Nova Gorica

27 April Torneo delle Nazioni	Italy	0–2	China	Gradisca d'Isonzo, Italy
18:00 UTC+1		Report	Sha Ming 2', 9'	Stadium: Stadio Gino Colaussi; Referee: Dzenan Meskovic (Italy)

29 April Torneo delle Nazioni	Austria	1–0	China	Hermagor-Pressegger See, Austria
13:00 UTC+1	Safet Gracic 46'	Report		Stadium: FC "EP Schuller" Hermagor

1 May Torneo delle Nazioni	Romania	1–0	China	Mariano del Friuli, Italy
11:00 UTC+1	Batran Burchardt 63'	Report		Stadium: Campo Sportivo A.S.D. Mariano

24 October U-15 World Cup & Festival	Central African Republic	0–4	China	Baku, Azerbaijan
10:15 UTC+4		Report	Zhong Junhui 6'; Xu Xinze 24'; Sha Ming 38'; Guo Rundong 40'	Stadium: Hövsan Competition Complex Pitch 8A

25 October U-15 World Cup & Festival	China	1–1	Japan	Baku, Azerbaijan
09:00 UTC+4	Lu Tianhuai 17'	Report	Ren Tsuruoka 8'	Stadium: Hövsan Competition Complex Pitch 8A

25 October U-15 World Cup & Festival	Angola	3–2	China	Baku, Azerbaijan
15:45 UTC+4	Nequeteira 5'; Neves 13', 32'	Report	Sha Ming 27' (pen.), 40' (pen.)	Stadium: Hövsan Competition Complex Pitch 8A

26 October U-15 World Cup & Festival	Saudi Arabia	2–5	China	Baku, Azerbaijan
12:45 UTC+4	Alqahtani 18'; Binseed 23'	Report	Zhong Junhui 8', 20', 39' (pen.); Wang Zipei 17'; Guo Rundong 19'	Stadium: Hövsan Competition Complex Pitch 6A

26 October U-15 World Cup & Festival	China	8–3	Solomon Islands	Baku, Azerbaijan
19:30 UTC+4		Report		Stadium: Hövsan Competition Complex Pitch 6A

28 October U-15 World Cup & Festival	Iran	2-1	China	Baku, Azerbaijan
12:45 UTC+4		Report		Stadium: Hövsan Competition Complex Pitch 6A

28 October U-15 World Cup & Festival	China	3-2	Congo	Baku, Azerbaijan
19:30 UTC+4		Report		Stadium: Hövsan Competition Complex Pitch 10A

29 October U-15 World Cup & Festival	Malaysia	1-3	China	Baku, Azerbaijan
10:15 UTC+4		Report		Stadium: Hövsan Competition Complex Pitch 8A

29 October U-15 World Cup & Festival	Kyrgyzstan	1-6	China	Baku, Azerbaijan
17:00 UTC+4		Report		Stadium: Hövsan Competition Complex Pitch 7A

30 October U-15 World Cup & Festival	China	1-1 (4-5 p)	Turkey	Baku, Azerbaijan
09:00 UTC+4		Report		Stadium: Hövsan Competition Complex Pitch 1A

== Coaching staff ==
Position	Name
Head coach	(Japan) Bin Ukishima
Assistant coach	(Japan) Ishikawa Kei
Assistant coach	(China) Cao Yang
Goalkeeping coach	(Japan) Adauto Alexandre Masson
Fitness coach	(China) Wu Mingkun

== Current squad ==
The following 21 players were called up for the 2026 FIFA U-17 World Cup.

No.	Pos.	Player	Date of birth (age)	Club
12	GK	Qin Ziniu	10 July 2009 (aged 17)	(Chinese Football Association) Evergrande Football School
1	GK	Jiang Chengen	2 May 2010 (aged 16)	(Chinese Football Association) Hubei Istar
21	GK	Jiang Yuhan	1 January 2010 (aged 16)	(Chinese Football Association) Qingdao Hainiu
5	DF	Li Junpeng	19 February 2009 (aged 17)	(Chinese Football Association) Shandong Taishan
2	DF	Zhang Xuyao	22 March 2009 (aged 17)	(Chinese Football Association) Shandong Taishan
19	DF	Zhang Junhao	3 January 2009 (aged 17)	(Chinese Football Association) Shandong Taishan
18	DF	Liu Zhicheng	28 March 2009 (aged 17)	(Chinese Football Association) Qingdao West Coast
4	DF	Nan Zixun	23 March 2009 (aged 17)	(Chinese Football Association) Tsinghua University High School
3	DF	Jin Yucheng	15 June 2009 (aged 17)	(Croatian Football Federation) Lokomotiva Zagreb
13	MF	Pan Chaowei	25 February 2010 (aged 16)	(Chinese Football Association) Shandong Taishan
8	MF	Xu Zhengpeng	15 March 2009 (aged 17)	(Chinese Football Association) Wuhan Three Towns
11	MF	He Sifan	14 January 2009 (aged 17)	(Chinese Football Association) Wuhan Three Towns
7	MF	Kuang Zhaolei	13 March 2009 (aged 17)	(Chinese Football Association) Qingdao Hainiu
17	MF	Li Jiarun	5 September 2009 (aged 17)	(Chinese Football Association) Meizhou Hakka
6	MF	Zhou Yunuo	26 February 2009 (aged 17)	(Chinese Football Association) Tsinghua University High School
10	MF	Wan Xiang	21 April 2009 (aged 17)	(Football Association of Serbia) Red Star Belgrade
16	MF	Jin Junhu	18 February 2010 (aged 16)	(Korea Football Association) Suwon Samsung Bluewings
20	FW	Shuai Weihao	5 January 2009 (aged 17)	(Chinese Football Association) Chengdu Rongcheng
9	FW	Zhao Songyuan	7 April 2009 (aged 17)	(Chinese Football Association) Tsinghua University High School
14	FW	Liang Shiyu	6 May 2009 (aged 17)	(Chinese Football Association) Wuhan Three Towns
15	FW	Jin Guancheng	13 July 2009 (aged 17)	(Korea Football Association) Ulsan HD

== Competitive record ==
=== FIFA U-17 World Cup ===
Year	Result	Pos	P	W	D	L	F	A
(China) 1985	Quarter-finals	8th	4	2	1	1	8	7
(Canada) 1987	Did not qualify							
(Scotland) 1989	Group stage	12th	3	1	1	1	1	3
(Italy) 1991	Group stage	14th	3	0	1	2	4	7
(Japan) 1993	Group stage	14th	3	0	1	2	2	5
(Ecuador) 1995	Did not qualify							
(Egypt) 1997	Did not qualify							
(New Zealand) 1999	Did not qualify							
(Trinidad and Tobago) 2001	Did not qualify							
(Finland) 2003	Group stage	14th	3	0	1	2	5	7
(Peru) 2005	Quarter-finals	7th	4	1	2	1	4	7
(South Korea) 2007	Did not qualify							
(Nigeria) 2009	Did not qualify							
(Mexico) 2011	Did not qualify							
(United Arab Emirates) 2013	Did not qualify							
(Chile) 2015	Did not qualify							
(India) 2017	Did not qualify							
(Brazil) 2019	Did not qualify							
(Indonesia) 2023	Did not qualify							
(Qatar) 2025	Did not qualify							
(Qatar) 2026	In progress	TBD	1	0	0	1	0	5
Total: 7/21	Quarter-finals	7th	21	4	7	10	24	41

=== AFC U-17 Asian Cup ===
Year	Result	Pos	Pld	W	D	L	GF	GA
(Qatar) 1985	Group stage	7th	3	0	2	1	2	3
(Qatar) 1986	did not qualify							
(Thailand) 1988	Third place	3rd	6	2	4	0	7	4
(United Arab Emirates) 1990	Third place	3rd	5	3	1	1	11	2
(Saudi Arabia) 1992	Champions	1st	5	3	2	0	9	4
(Qatar) 1994	Group stage	5th	4	2	0	2	14	5
(Thailand) 1996	Group stage	6th	4	1	1	2	5	10
(Qatar) 1998	did not qualify							
(Vietnam) 2000	Group stage	5th	4	2	0	2	13	12
(United Arab Emirates) 2002	Third place	3rd	6	5	0	1	13	4
(Japan) 2004	Champions	1st	6	5	0	1	10	5
(Singapore) 2006	Quarter-finals	5th	4	2	1	1	10	5
(Uzbekistan) 2008	Group stage	9th	3	1	1	1	4	4
(Uzbekistan) 2010	Group stage	12th	3	0	1	2	1	4
(Iran) 2012	Group stage	9th	3	0	3	0	4	4
(Thailand) 2014	Group stage	11th	3	1	0	2	2	6
(India) 2016	did not qualify							
(Malaysia) 2018	did not qualify							
(Thailand) 2023	Group stage	13th	3	0	1	2	4	9
(Saudi Arabia) 2025	Group stage	11th	3	1	0	2	4	4
(Saudi Arabia) 2026	Runners-up	2nd	6	3	0	3	10	7
(Saudi Arabia) 2027	qualified							
Total:16/20	2 Titles		71	31	17	23	123	92

== Head-to-head record ==
The following table shows China's head-to-head record in the FIFA U-17 World Cup and AFC U-17 Asian Cup.

=== In FIFA U-17 World Cup ===
Opponent	Pld	W	D	L	GF	GA	GD	Win %
Argentina	2	0	1	1	1	2	−1	0.00
Bolivia	1	0	1	0	1	1	+0	0.00
Canada	1	1	0	0	1	0	+1	100.00
Chile	1	0	1	0	2	2	+0	0.00
Colombia	1	0	0	1	1	2	−1	0.00
Costa Rica	1	0	1	0	1	1	+0	0.00
Finland	1	0	0	1	1	2	−1	0.00
Germany	1	0	0	1	2	4	−2	0.00
Ghana	1	0	1	0	1	1	+0	0.00
Guinea	1	1	0	0	2	1	+1	100.00
Italy	1	0	1	0	2	2	+0	0.00
Mexico	1	0	1	0	3	3	+0	0.00
Nigeria	1	0	0	1	0	3	−3	0.00
Peru	1	1	0	0	1	0	+1	100.00
Poland	1	0	0	1	0	2	−2	0.00
Tunisia	1	0	0	1	0	1	−1	0.00
Turkey	1	0	0	1	1	5	−4	0.00
United States	2	1	0	1	4	4	+0	50.00
Total	20	4	7	9	24	36	−12	20.00

=== In AFC U-17 Asian Cup ===
Opponent	Pld	W	D	L	GF	GA	GD	Win %
Australia	4	1	0	3	6	10	−4	25.00
Bahrain	2	0	1	1	0	6	−6	0.00
Bangladesh	1	1	0	0	5	0	+5	100.00
Hong Kong	1	1	0	0	2	0	+2	100.00
India	4	2	1	1	11	7	+4	50.00
Indonesia	1	1	0	0	5	0	+5	100.00
Iran	2	2	0	0	5	0	+5	100.00
Iraq	4	1	1	2	3	5	−2	25.00
Japan	4	1	0	3	4	13	−9	25.00
Jordan	1	1	0	0	3	0	+3	100.00
Kuwait	1	0	0	1	0	1	−1	0.00
Myanmar	2	2	0	0	8	1	+7	100.00
Nepal	1	1	0	0	6	2	+4	100.00
North Korea	4	2	1	1	6	5	+1	50.00
Oman	2	1	0	1	1	2	−1	50.00
Qatar	6	2	2	2	7	6	+1	33.33
Saudi Arabia	5	2	1	2	8	8	+0	40.00
South Yemen	1	0	1	0	2	2	+0	0.00
Syria	2	1	1	0	2	1	+1	50.00
Tajikistan	1	0	1	0	1	1	+0	0.00
Thailand	5	3	2	0	6	2	+4	60.00
Turkmenistan	1	1	0	0	2	1	+1	100.00
United Arab Emirates	4	1	3	0	3	2	+1	25.00
Uzbekistan	4	2	1	1	14	3	+11	50.00
Vietnam	2	0	1	1	5	6	−1	0.00
Yemen	1	0	0	1	0	1	−1	0.00
Total	65	28	17	20	113	85	+28	43.08
