= Rami Malaeb =

Lebanese footballer (born 2009)

Personal information
- Full name: Rami Tarek Malaeb
- Date of birth: 1 September 2009 (age 17)
- Place of birth: Aley, Lebanon
- Position: Winger

Team information
- Current team: Rot-Weiss Essen
- Number: 40

Youth career
- –2022: Baissour
- 2022–2024: Rot-Weiß Oberhausen
- 2024–: Rot-Weiss Essen

Senior career*
Years	Team	Apps	(Gls)
2026–	Rot-Weiss Essen	1	(0)

International career^{‡}
2025	Lebanon U17	4	(1)
- * Club domestic league appearances and goals as of 17 October 2026 ‡ National team caps and goals as of 28 September 2025

Rami Tarek Malaeb (Arabic: رامي طارق ملاعب; born 1 September 2009) is a Lebanese professional footballer who plays as a winger for 3. Liga club Rot-Weiss Essen.

== Club career ==
Having previously played for Baissour at youth level in Lebanon, Malaeb joined the youth setup of German club Rot-Weiß Oberhausen in 2022. He moved to Rot-Weiss Essen in 2024, progressing through the club's youth teams before training regularly with the first team during the 2026–27 season.

On 17 October 2026, Malaeb made his senior debut for Rot-Weiss Essen in a 1–0 away defeat against FC Ingolstadt in the 3. Liga, entering the match as a substitute in the 84th minute. Five days later, on 22 October, Rot-Weiss Essen announced that Malaeb would become a permanent member of the first-team squad from 1 July 2027 and receive a professional contract.

== International career ==
In November 2025, Malaeb was called up to the Lebanon national under-17 team for qualification matches for the 2026 AFC U-17 Asian Cup, scoring in a 1–1 draw against Palestine.

== Career statistics ==
=== Club ===
As of match played 17 October 2026

Appearances and goals by club, season and competition
Club	Season	League			DFB-Pokal		Total	
Club	Season	Division	Apps	Goals	Apps	Goals	Apps	Goals
Rot-Weiss Essen	2026–27	3. Liga	1	0	0	0	1	0
Career total			1	0	0	0	1	0
