= Kuang Zhaolei =

Chinese professional footballer (born 2009)

Personal information
- Full name: Kuang Zhaolei
- Date of birth: 13 March 2009 (age 17)
- Place of birth: Guangzhou, Guangdong, China
- Height: 1.72 m (5 ft 8 in)
- Positions: Forward; right winger

Team information
- Current team: Qingdao Hainiu
- Number: 27

Youth career
- 2017–2018: Guangzhou Yuexiu Dongshan
- 2018–2023: Tsinghua University High School
- 2023: Damm
- 2023–2024: L'Hospitalet
- 2024–2025: Damm
- 2025–2026: Atlètic Lleida

Senior career*
Years	Team	Apps	(Gls)
2026–	Qingdao Hainiu	6	(0)

International career^{‡}
2024–2026	China U17	21	(6)
Medal record
Representing China
AFC U-17 Asian Cup
Runner-up	2026 Saudi Arabia
- * Club domestic league appearances and goals as of 8 November 2026 ‡ National team caps and goals as of 22 May 2026

Kuang Zhaolei (simplified Chinese: 邝兆镭; traditional Chinese: 邝兆鐳; pinyin: Kuàng Zhàoléi; born 13 March 2009) is a Chinese professional footballer who plays as a forward or right winger for Chinese Super League club Qingdao Hainiu and the China U17 national team.

== Early life ==
Kuang was born on 13 March 2009 in Guangzhou, Guangdong. He began playing football at age four while attending kindergarten. In 2017, he registered with Dongshan Youth Sports Club in Yuexiu District, Guangzhou, and was a participant of the Chinese Football Boy development program founded by football commentator Dong Lu.

== Club career ==
=== Youth career in China ===
While with China Football Youth, Kuang participated in multiple international youth tournaments. In August 2018, he competed in the Starry Sky Cup International Youth Football Invitational in Germany, scoring 11 goals and winning the Golden Boot as his team defeated youth sides from Borussia Dortmund, Werder Bremen, and Hannover 96. In 2019, he became the first Chinese player to receive an official invitation for a trial at FC Barcelona's La Masia academy.

In 2022, Kuang led Tsinghua University High School's U13 team to the runner-up position in the inaugural China Youth Football League, scoring in the semi-final against Zhejiang Energy U13.

=== Move to Spain ===
In March 2023, Kuang transferred to CF Damm's U14 youth team in Spain's Catalonia region. He made his debut for the club on 8 April 2023 in a Spanish Cup match, scoring one goal and providing three assists. In December 2023, he transferred to CE L'Hospitalet's youth team, and in January 2024, scored his first free-kick goal in the Catalan U16 League. He returned to CF Damm in August 2024.

=== CE Atlètic Lleida ===
On 28 July 2025, Kuang signed with CE Atlètic Lleida, competing in the Segunda Federación (Spanish fourth tier), on a contract until 2027. The club had purchased a vacant spot in the league following the administrative relegation of local rivals Lleida Esportiu.

During pre-season, Kuang appeared in multiple friendlies. On 22 August 2025, he started wearing the number 10 jersey in a friendly against Barcelona Atlètic. On 25 August, he came on as a substitute in the 69th minute against Tudelano and scored during the penalty shootout, though his team lost 7–8.

By September 2025, Kuang was not included in the club's first-team roster for the Segunda Federación campaign. Reports indicated he would instead register with the club's affiliated U19 team, AE Segre, to compete in the U19 National League (second tier of Spanish U19 football).

In December 2025, Kuang suffered a significant injury requiring wheelchair assistance, marking the second major injury of his career following a similar incident five years prior.

=== Qingdao Hainiu ===
On 17 February 2026, Chinese Super League club Qingdao Hainiu officially announced the signing of Kuang on a free transfer.

== International career ==
Kuang has been a regular member of the China U16 national team. In July 2024, he scored in a 4–1 victory over South Korea U15 during a training camp.

During the 2026 AFC U-17 Asian Cup qualification in November 2025, he contributed 2 goals and 4 assists across 4 appearances, including 3 assists in the decisive match against Bangladesh, helping China qualify for the final tournament. He also participated in the 2025 CFA China Team Xingtai Cup Hohhot International Football Tournament, where China U16 defeated Australia U16 5–2 to win the championship.

== Playing style ==
Kuang primarily operates as a right winger or attacking midfielder. He is noted for his first touch, acceleration, and ability to beat opponents through dribbling and feints. He is ambidextrous, capable of crossing from the right or cutting inside to shoot with his left foot. His passing range includes using the outside of the foot to deliver crosses.

However, evaluations have noted that his physical strength and core stability require improvement, and he occasionally holds onto the ball too long.
