= Bin Ukishima =

Japanese football manager

Bin Ukishima 浮嶋 敏
Personal information
- Date of birth: 4 September 1967 (age 59)
- Place of birth: Tokyo, Japan
- Position: Defender

Senior career*
Years	Team	Apps	(Gls)
1985–1990	Nissan Farm		
1991–1995	Fujitsu SC		

Managerial career
- 2006–2011: Yokohama FC youth
- 2011–2019: Shonan Bellmare (assistant)
- 2019–2021: Shonan Bellmare
- 2024–: China U-15
- * Club domestic league appearances and goals

Bin Ukishima (浮嶋 敏, Ukishima Bin; born 4 September 1967) is a Japanese football manager.

== Career statistics ==
=== Club ===
Club	Season	League			National Cup		League Cup		Continental		Other		Total	
Club	Season	Division	Apps	Goals	Apps	Goals	Apps	Goals	Apps	Goals	Apps	Goals	Apps	Goals
Fujitsu SC	1991–92	Japan Soccer League	–		0	0	–		–		0	0	0	0
Fujitsu SC	1992	JFL	16	0	2	0	–		–		0	0	18	0
Fujitsu SC	1993	JFL	0	0	0	0	–		–		0	0	0	0
Fujitsu SC	1994	JFL	4	0	0	0	–		–		0	0	4	0
Fujitsu SC	1995	JFL	1	0	0	0	–		–		0	0	1	0
Career total			21	0	2	0	0	0	0	0	0	0	23	0

== Managerial statistics ==
As of the end 2021 season.

Managerial record by team and tenure
Team	From	To	Record				
Team	From	To	P	W	D	L	Win %
Shonan Bellmare	2019	2021	80	17	27	36	21.3
Total			80	17	27	36	21.3
