= Football at the National Games of China =

Men's football (soccer) was a Chinese National Games sport since the first edition. Women's football competition began in 1987. Since 1997, the age limit for men's teams is under-20. Two youth divisions, men's under-16 and women's under-18, were launched since the 11th National Games.

== Men's tournaments ==
=== Medal table ===
Team	Gold	Silver	Bronze	Total
Liaoning	3 (1975*, 1993, 2001)	1 (1987)	1 (2005)	5
Shandong	3 (1979, 1997, 2005)	0	2 (2001, 2009)	5
Guangdong	2 (1975*, 1987)	3 (1983, 1997, 2009)	2 (1979, 1993)	7
Shanghai	2 (1983, 2009)	3 (1965, 2001, 2005)	1 (1997)	6
Hebei	1 (1965)	1 (1959)	0	2
Army	1 (1959)	0	3 (1965, 1975, 1987)	4
Beijing	0	2 (1979, 1993)	1 (1959)	3
Tianjin	0	0	1 (1983)	1

* = shared

== Men's youth tournaments ==
=== Medal table ===
Team	Gold	Silver	Bronze	Total
Shandong	1 (2009)	0	0	1
Shaanxi	0	1 (2009)	0	1
Liaoning	0	0	1 (2009)	1

== Women's tournaments ==
=== Medal table ===
Team	Gold	Silver	Bronze	Total
Beijing	2 (1987, 2005)	2 (1997, 2001)	0	4
Shanghai	2 (1997, 2001)	0	2 (2005, 2009)	4
Liaoning	1 (2009)	2 (1987, 2005)	1 (1993)	4
Henan	1 (1993)	0	0	1
Guangdong	0	1 (1993)	2 (1987, 1997)	3
Jiangsu	0	1 (2009)	0	1
Sichuan	0	0	1 (2001)	1

== Women's youth tournaments ==
=== Medal table ===
Team	Gold	Silver	Bronze	Total
Jiangsu	1 (2009)	0	0	1
Shanghai	0	1 (2009)	0	1
Tianjin	0	0	1 (2009)	1

== Former tournaments ==
=== 1910–1924 ===
==== Medal table ====
Team	Gold	Silver	Total
East China	2 (1914, 1924)	1 (1910)	3
South China	1 (1910)	0	1
North China	0	1 (1914)	1
Central China	0	1 (1924)	1

=== 1930–1935 ===
==== Medal table ====
Team	Gold	Silver	Bronze	Total
Shanghai	2 (1930, 1933)	0	0	2
Hong Kong	1 (1935)	0	1 (1933*)	2
Guangdong	0	1 (1933)	2 (1930*, 1935)	3
Nanjing	0	1 (1930)	0	1
Malaysian Chinese	0	1 (1935)	0	1
Liaoning	0	0	1 (1930*)	1
Hebei	0	0	1 (1933*)	1

* = shared

== All-time medal table ==
Team	Gold	Silver	Bronze	Total
Shanghai	6	4	3	13
Liaoning	4	3	4	11
Shandong	4	0	2	6
Guangdong	2	5	6	13
Beijing	2	4	1	7
East China	2	1	0	3
Hebei	1	1	1	3
Jiangsu	1	1	0	2
Army	1	0	3	4
Hong Kong	1	0	1	2
Henan	1	0	0	1
South China	1	0	0	1
Shaanxi	0	1	0	1
North China	0	1	0	1
Central China	0	1	0	1
Nanjing	0	1	0	1
Malaysian Chinese	0	1	0	1
Tianjin	0	0	2	2
Sichuan	0	0	1	1
