= Shuai Weihao =

Chinese footballer (born 2009)

Personal information
- Full name: Shuai Weihao
- Date of birth: 5 January 2009 (age 17)
- Place of birth: Xinjin County, Sichuan, China
- Height: 1.78 m (5 ft 10 in)
- Position: Forward

Team information
- Current team: Chengdu Rongcheng
- Number: 52

Youth career
- –2025: Chengdu Rongcheng

Senior career*
Years	Team	Apps	(Gls)
2025–	Chengdu Rongcheng B	26	(6)
2025–	Chengdu Rongcheng	0	(0)

International career^{‡}
2025–2026	China U17	21	(14)
Medal record
Representing China
AFC U-17 Asian Cup
Runner-up	2026 Saudi Arabia
- * Club domestic league appearances and goals as of 31 August 2026 ‡ National team caps and goals as of 30 November 2025

Shuai Weihao (simplified Chinese: 帅惟浩; traditional Chinese: 帥惟浩; pinyin: Shuài Wéihào; born 5 January 2009) is a Chinese professional footballer who plays as a forward for Chinese Super League club Chengdu Rongcheng.

== Club career ==
=== Early career ===
Born in Xinjin County, Chengdu, Sichuan, Shuai Weihao started playing football in second grade. He is a graduate of the Chengdu Rongcheng youth system. In November 2024, he became the top scorer for the 2024 China Youth Football League at the under-15 level. He scored sixteen goals in twelve matches. He scored seven goals against Guangxi Pingguo Haliao in a single match in the competition. In January 2025, he and a Chengdu FA U15 squad went on a 26-day trip to São Paulo in Brazil for a football exchange initiative.

=== Chengdu Rongcheng ===
On 20 March 2025, Shuai was promoted to Chengdu Rongcheng's B team, which competed in the 2025 China League Two season, and was given the number 52 shirt. On 23 March, he made his senior debut in a victory over Guangzhou Dandelion Alpha, becoming the first Chinese footballer born in 2009 to make an appearance in a professional league. On 2 May, he scored his first professional goal in a 4–1 home win against Quanzhou Yassin. With this goal, he became the second-youngest goalscorer in China's professional leagues at 16 years 117 days, behind only Han Jiabao. In the following month, Shuai scored in two consecutive league matches, winning both against Guangdong Mingtu and Wuhan Three Towns B respectively. On 31 August, he scored a double in Chengdu Rongcheng B's 2–1 victory against Nantong Haimen Codion. For his performances throughout the month of August, he was given the league's Young Player of the Month award. In September, he was selected in Chengdu Rongcheng's first-team roster for the 2025–26 AFC Champions League Elite. In the 2025 season, Shuai totalled five goals in twenty appearances for his debut season.

== International career ==
In March 2024, he was included in a 2009 age level elite training camp organised by the Chinese Football Association.

In May to June 2025, he was selected as of a China U16 squad to take part in a friendly competition hosted in Hohhot, Inner Mongolia, China. He scored two goals, one each against Saudi Arabia in a 2–1 win and Australia in a 5–2 win. In November, he was called up to the China U17 to compete in 2026 AFC U-17 Asian Cup qualification. He scored once against Sri Lanka, twice against Bahrain, and completed a hat-trick against Timor-Leste and Bangladesh.

== Personal life ==
In an interview in 2025, Shuai listed Wang Yudong, Erling Haaland, and Cristiano Ronaldo as his footballing idols. He likes to play the video game Honor of Kings.

== Career statistics ==
=== Club ===
As of 21 September 2025

Appearances and goals by club, season, and competition
Club	Season	League			Cup		Continental		Other		Total	
Club	Season	Division	Apps	Goals	Apps	Goals	Apps	Goals	Apps	Goals	Apps	Goals
Chengdu Rongcheng B	2025	China League Two	20	5	–		–		–		20	5
Chengdu Rongcheng	2025	Chinese Super League	0	0	0	0	0 (Note: Appearances in AFC Champions League Elite)	0	–		0	0
Career total			20	5	0	0	0	0	0	0	20	5
