= Wan Xiang =

Chinese footballer (born 2009)

Personal information
- Full name: Wan Xiang
- Date of birth: 21 April 2009 (age 17)
- Place of birth: Qitaihe, Heilongjiang, China
- Height: 1.73 m (5 ft 8 in)
- Positions: Attacking midfielder; forward

Team information
- Current team: Red Star Belgrade (youth)

Youth career
- 2019–2026: Hubei Istar
- 2025: Duljaj Football Academy
- 2026–: Red Star Belgrade

International career^{‡}
Years	Team	Apps	(Gls)
2025	China U16	6	(1)
2025–	China U17	11	(7)
Medal record
Representing China
AFC U-17 Asian Cup
Runner-up	2026 Saudi Arabia
- ‡ National team caps and goals as of 16:33, 16 November 2026 (UTC)

Wan Xiang (Chinese: 万项, Serbian: Ван Сјанг; born 21 April 2009) is a Chinese footballer who plays as an attacking midfielder and forward for Red Star Belgrade's youth academy.

== Club career ==
Wan joined the academy of Chinese side Hubei Istar in 2019, before briefly spending two months in Serbia at the Duljaj Football Academy in Topola in late 2025. On 15 February 2026, he signed for the academy of Serbian SuperLiga club Red Star Belgrade on a three-year contract, becoming the first Chinese player to sign for the club.

On his UEFA Youth League debut, Wan scored the only goal in a 1–0 win against Slovenian side NK Bravo, becoming the first Chinese player to score at the tournament.

== International career ==
Wan represents the China under-17 national team. During qualification for the 2026 AFC U-17 Asian Cup, he scored five goals and got six assists across five matches.

On 28 October 2026, he was included in China's preliminary squad for the 2026 FIFA U-17 World Cup, later being included in their final squad on 11 November.
