= Tsinghua University High School =

Public secondary school in Haidian, Beijing, China

- 清华大学附属中学
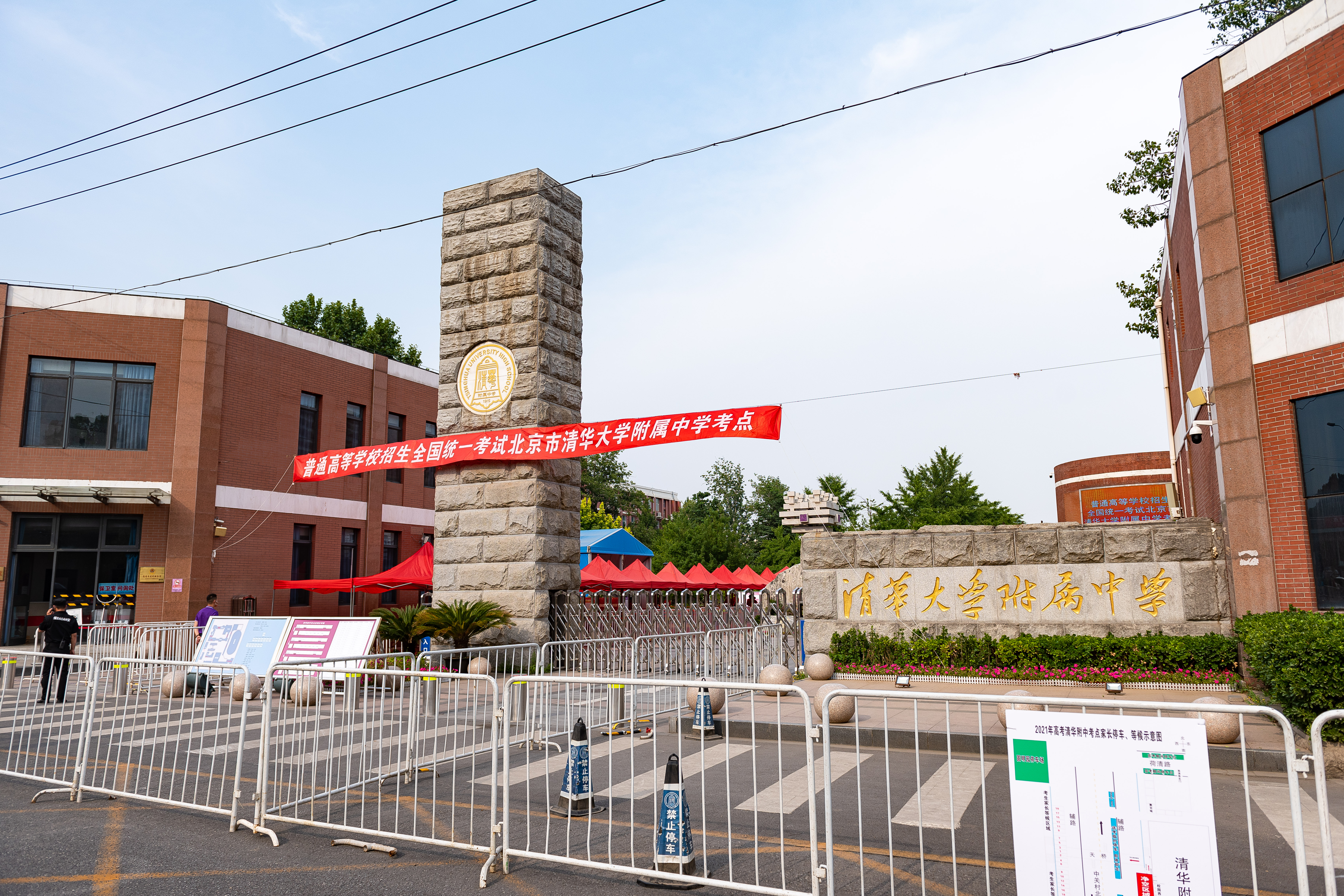
- School gate

Location
- Zhongguancun North Street, Haidian; Beijing; China; 40°00′29.02″N 116°18′50.80″E

Information
- Type: Public
- Motto: 自强不息，厚德载物
- Established: 1915 (Chengzhi School); 1952 (as a separate secondary school)
- Educational authority: Beijing City Haidian District Education Committee
- Principal: Fang Yan (方妍)
- Website: www.qhfz.edu.cn

Chinese name
- Simplified Chinese: 清华大学附属中学
- Traditional Chinese: 清華大學附屬中學
Transcriptions
Standard Mandarin
- Hanyu Pinyin: Qīnghuá Dàxué Fùshǔ Zhōngxué

Tsinghua University High School (清华大学附属中学) is a public secondary school in Haidian, Beijing, China, affiliated with Tsinghua University. It is one of the secondary schools attached to universities under the Ministry of Education and was among the first schools designated as demonstration senior high schools in Beijing. It traces its origins to Chengzhi School, founded in 1915 for the children of Tsinghua staff, became a separate school in 1952, and has taught both junior and senior secondary students recruited from across Beijing since 1960. The school says it has produced nearly 50,000 graduates.

In May 1966 its students formed the first group to call itself the Red Guards, from which the movement spread across China. Under principal Wang Dianjun, from 2007 to 2022, the school promoted university-level preparatory courses and a system for assessing students' all-round development, and expanded by running branch schools.

== History ==
=== Chengzhi School and the attached junior school (1915–1959) ===
Chengzhi School (成志学校) was founded in the autumn of 1915 by two Tsinghua administrators, Li Zhonghua and Wang Tieying, for the children of the institution's staff. It initially comprised only a primary school and a kindergarten, housed just inside Tsinghua's west gate. During the Second Sino-Japanese War, Tsinghua moved south and joined Peking and Nankai universities in the National Southwestern Associated University, which set up its own attached secondary and primary schools in 1939. After Tsinghua returned to Beijing in the autumn of 1946, Chengzhi School reopened and added a junior secondary section. Following the nationwide reorganisation of higher education in 1952, that section was separated from the primary school and opened on 1 September 1952 as the junior secondary school attached to Tsinghua University. It then had three junior grades, and all of its pupils were children of Tsinghua and Peking University staff; enrolment later grew to more than 400.

=== Founding of the high school (1959–1966) ===
In 1959 the Ministry of Education approved the establishment of Tsinghua University High School as a school recruiting from the whole city. It moved to a new site north of the Tsinghua campus and east of the Old Summer Palace, and in 1960, under principal Wan Bangru, admitted its first junior and senior secondary classes.

=== Cultural Revolution ===
On the evening of 29 May 1966, a group of the school's students, among them Bu Dahua, Luo Xiaohai and Zhang Chengzhi, met at the ruins of the Old Summer Palace and agreed to form an organisation called the "Red Guards"; the date was later regarded as the birth of the Red Guard movement. On 1 August 1966 Mao Zedong wrote to the group expressing his "warm support". According to the historian Wang Youqin, the Red Guards then took control of the school, renamed it the "Red Guard Combat School", and violence against staff and students escalated; on the night of 26 August 1966 the physics teacher Liu Shuhua was beaten and humiliated at a "struggle session" organised by the Red Guards and killed himself the same night.

=== Recovery and growth (1977–2006) ===
In 1978 the school was among the first to be designated a key secondary school in Beijing after the Cultural Revolution. In 1980, 194 of its 198 senior secondary graduates entered university, 180 of them key universities. During the 1980s it piloted a senior science class and a sports class named after Ma Yuehan; after 2000 it opened art classes in cooperation with Tsinghua's Academy of Arts and Design.

=== Wang Dianjun era (2007–2022) ===
In January 2007 Wang Dianjun, a professor of mathematics at Tsinghua University, became principal. The school set up an international division in 2008 and began holding a student leadership camp in 2009. From 2009 Wang campaigned for university-level preparatory courses in secondary schools, and in 2013 the Chinese Advanced Placement (CAP) programme, launched by the Chinese Society of Education with the ministry's approval, put him in charge of course development. In 2015 the school and Tsinghua's online education centre launched online CAP courses, and the school developed its own system for assessing students' all-round development. In July 2013 it launched a programme that selects 100 rural students a year from poor counties for several years of support. The top-scoring science candidate in Beijing's gaokao in 2013 and the top-scoring humanities candidate in 2014 were both from the school.

In July 2022 Tsinghua University appointed Fang Yan, previously the school's Party secretary, to succeed Wang Dianjun as principal. At its 110th anniversary on 18 October 2025, the school was reported to run nearly 30 group schools in and outside Beijing and to support more than ten schools in disadvantaged areas.

== Ethos and organisation ==
The school shares Tsinghua University's motto, 自强不息，厚德载物. Its school ethos is "actions speak louder than words", and it describes its aim as educating top innovative talent with patriotism, physical fitness, inner richness and an international outlook. Fang Yan is principal, and Xu Wenbing has been Party secretary since June 2026.

The main campus is on Zhongguancun North Street in Haidian, and the school also has campuses at Aosen and Jiangtai Road. Its website lists 16 group and partner schools, among them Tsinghua University Experimental School and schools in Chaoyang, Shangdi, Yongfeng and Changping in Beijing, together with schools in Wenchang, Zhengzhou, Fuzhou and Kunming. Tsinghua University Experimental School, founded in 2002 as a private school, shares the campus, teachers and examinations of Tsinghua University High School and became a public school in 2022.

== Principals ==
Principals of the school have included Wan Bangru (from 1960), Guo Jiansheng, Zhao Qinggang, Gao Celi, Wang Dianjun (January 2007 – July 2022) and Fang Yan (from July 2022).

== Notable alumni ==
- Liu Yandong, former Vice Premier of China, senior secondary class of 1961
- Yang Chen-Ning, Nobel laureate in physics, Chengzhi School class of 1933
- Shi Tiesheng, writer
- Chen Luyu, television host
- Zhang Chengzhi, writer and one of the founders of the school's Red Guards in 1966
