= 2018 AFF U-16 Youth Championship =

2018 AFF U-16 Championship
Kejuaraan Remaja U-16 AFF 2018

Tournament details
- Host country: Indonesia
- Cities: Gresik and Sidoarjo
- Dates: 29 July – 11 August
- Teams: 11 (from 1 sub-confederation)
- Venues: 2 (in 2 host cities)

Final positions
- Champions: Indonesia (1st title)
- Runners-up: Thailand
- Third place: Malaysia
- Fourth place: Myanmar

Tournament statistics
- Matches played: 29
- Goals scored: 115 (3.97 per match)
- Attendance: 130,497 (4,500 per match)
- Top scorer: (Indonesia) Bagus Kahfi (13 goals)
- Best player: (Thailand) Thanarin Thumsen
- Fair play award: Thailand

The 2018 AFF U-16 Championship was the thirteenth edition of the AFF U-16 Championship, the annual international youth association football championship organised by the ASEAN Football Federation for men's under-16 national teams of Southeast Asia.

A total of 11 teams played in the tournament, with players born on or after 1 January 2003 eligible to participate. Each match had a duration of 80 minutes, consisting of two halves of 40 minutes.

Indonesia beat Thailand 4–3 through penalty shoot-out in the final for their first title in the championship.

== Participant teams ==
There was no qualification, and all entrants advanced to the final tournament. The following 11 teams from member associations of the ASEAN Football Federation entered the tournament.

| Team | Association | App | Previous best performance |
|---|---|---|---|
| Brunei | FA Brunei DS | 7th | Group stage (6 times) |
| Cambodia | FF Cambodia | 9th | Fourth place (2016) |
| Indonesia (H) | FA Indonesia | 9th | Runners-up (2013) |
| Laos | Lao FF | 11th | Runners-up (2002, 2007, 2011) |
| Malaysia | FA Malaysia | 10th | Winners (2013) |
| Myanmar | Myanmar FF | 10th | Winners (2002, 2005) |
| Philippines | Philippine FF | 7th | Group stage (6 times) |
| Singapore | FA Singapore | 9th | Fourth place (2008, 2011) |
| Thailand | FA Thailand | 9th | Winners (2007, 2011, 2015) |
| Timor-Leste | FF Timor-Leste | 6th | Third place (2010) |
| Vietnam | Vietnam FF | 11th | Winners (2006, 2010, 2017) |

== Group stage ==
- All matches were held in Indonesia.
- All times are local, IWST (UTC+7).

=== Group A ===
| Pos | Team | Pld | W | D | L | GF | GA | GD | Pts | Qualification |
|---|---|---|---|---|---|---|---|---|---|---|
| 1 | Indonesia (H) | 5 | 5 | 0 | 0 | 21 | 3 | +18 | 15 | Knockout stage |
| 2 | Myanmar | 5 | 3 | 1 | 1 | 17 | 7 | +10 | 10 | Knockout stage |
| 3 | Vietnam | 5 | 3 | 1 | 1 | 15 | 7 | +8 | 10 | |
| 4 | Timor-Leste | 5 | 2 | 0 | 3 | 8 | 12 | −4 | 6 | |
| 5 | Cambodia | 5 | 1 | 0 | 4 | 7 | 12 | −5 | 3 | |
| 6 | Philippines | 5 | 0 | 0 | 5 | 3 | 30 | −27 | 0 | |

Source: AFF
(H) Hosts
29 July 2018
15:30

| Cambodia | 0–1 | Vietnam |
|---|---|---|
| | Report | Đinh Thanh Trung 36' (pen.) |

Gelora Joko Samudro Stadium, Gresik
Attendance: 122
Referee: Abdul Hakim Mohd Haidi (Brunei)
29 July 2018
19:00

| Indonesia | 8–0 | Philippines |
|---|---|---|
| Supriadi 2'; Komang 18'; Fajar 32'; Zico 45'; Rendy 56'; Bagus 63' (pen.), 67', 73' | Report |

Gelora Delta Stadium, Sidoarjo
Attendance: 8,931
Referee: Souei Vongkham (Laos)
29 July 2018
19:00

| Myanmar | 3–2 | Timor-Leste |
|---|---|---|
| Khun Kyaw Zin Hein 47'; Aung Ko Oo 61'; Naing Htwe 79' | Report | C. Gusmão 43'; Amaral 73' |

Gelora Joko Samudro Stadium, Gresik
Attendance: 137
Referee: Fitri Maskon (Malaysia)

31 July 2018
15:30

| Vietnam | 4–0 | Timor-Leste |
|---|---|---|
| Đinh Thanh Trung 16', 75'; Trịnh Văn Chung 31'; Đoàn Chí Bảo 68' | Report |

Gelora Joko Samudro Stadium, Gresik
Attendance: 50
Referee: Wiwat Jumpao-on (Thailand)
31 July 2018
15:30

| Cambodia | 5–1 | Philippines |
|---|---|---|
| Daradevid 16'; Samel 28'; Rina 52', 72'; Bunnarong 80+1' | Report | R. Yu 11' |

Gelora Delta Stadium, Sidoarjo
Attendance: 221
Referee: Xaypaseuth Phongsanit (Laos)
31 July 2018
19:00

| Myanmar | 1–2 | Indonesia |
|---|---|---|
| Zaw Win Thein 72' (pen.) | Report | Bagus 8', 26' |

Gelora Delta Stadium, Sidoarjo
Attendance: 8,745
Referee: Amdillah Zainuddin (Brunei)

2 August 2018
15:30

| Timor-Leste | 2–1 | Cambodia |
|---|---|---|
| da Cruz 13'; E. da Costa 46' | Report | Bunnarong 29' |

Gelora Joko Samudro Stadium, Gresik
Attendance: 80
Referee: Souei Vongkham (Laos)
2 August 2018
15:30

| Philippines | 0–7 | Myanmar |
|---|---|---|
| | Report | Naung Naung Soe 2', 29'; Aung Ko Oo 25'; Zaw Win Thein 34'; Pyae Phyo Aung 46'; Khun Kyaw Zin Hein 53'; Wai Yan Soe 77' |

Gelora Delta Stadium, Sidoarjo
Attendance: 279
Referee: Abdul Hakim Mohd Haidi (Brunei)
2 August 2018
19:00

| Vietnam | 2–4 | Indonesia |
|---|---|---|
| Đinh Thanh Trung 6', 73' (pen.); Võ Nguyên Hoàng (red card) 66' | Report | Supriadi 29'; Bagus 45' (pen.), 61'; Andre 80+4'; Bagas (red card) 66' |

Gelora Delta Stadium, Sidoarjo
Attendance: 9,588
Referee: Xaypaseuth Phongsanit (Laos)

4 August 2018
15:30

| Myanmar | 4–1 | Cambodia |
|---|---|---|
| Leap Pheng 55' (o.g.); Naing Htwe 62'; Naung Naung Soe 65'; La Min Htwe 80+3' | Report | Samel 43' |

Gelora Delta Stadium, Sidoarjo
Attendance: 2,156
Referee: Fitri Maskon (Malaysia)
4 August 2018
15:30

| Philippines | 1–6 | Vietnam |
|---|---|---|
| Reyes 50' | Report | Hoàng Văn Thông 19'; Nguyễn Quốc Hoàng 27', 58', 80+2'; Đinh Thanh Trung 40'; Đậu Ngọc Thành 80' |

Gelora Joko Samudro Stadium, Gresik
Attendance: 37
Referee: Amdillah Zainuddin (Brunei)
4 August 2018
19:00

| Indonesia | 3–0 | Timor-Leste |
|---|---|---|
| Bagus 49', 80+2'; Zico 72' | Report | Oscar (yellow card) 63' (yellow-red card) 80+3' |

Gelora Delta Stadium, Sidoarjo
Attendance: 23,209
Referee: Wiwat Jumpao-on (Thailand)

6 August 2018
15:30

| Timor-Leste | 4–1 | Philippines |
|---|---|---|
| Rosquillo 44' (o.g.); Da Cruz 51'; C. Gusmão 53'; Gomez 55' | Report | Ortega 22' |

Gelora Joko Samudro Stadium, Gresik
Attendance: 34
Referee: Xaypaseuth Phongsanit (Laos)
6 August 2018
15:30

| Vietnam | 2–2 | Myanmar |
|---|---|---|
| Đinh Thanh Trung 27', 70' | Report | La Min Htwe 11'; Yan Kyaw Soe 59' |

Gelora Delta Stadium, Sidoarjo
Attendance: 751
Referee: Souei Vongkham (Laos)
6 August 2018
19:00

| Cambodia | 0–4 | Indonesia |
|---|---|---|
| | Report | Rendy 11'; Bagus 21', 34', 43' (pen.) |

Gelora Delta Stadium, Sidoarjo
Attendance: 15,343
Referee: Abdul Hakim Mohd Haidi (Brunei)

=== Group B ===
| Pos | Team | Pld | W | D | L | GF | GA | GD | Pts | Qualification |
|---|---|---|---|---|---|---|---|---|---|---|
| 1 | Thailand | 4 | 3 | 1 | 0 | 12 | 2 | +10 | 10 | Knockout stage |
| 2 | Malaysia | 4 | 3 | 0 | 1 | 12 | 3 | +9 | 9 | Knockout stage |
| 3 | Laos | 4 | 2 | 1 | 1 | 5 | 4 | +1 | 7 | |
| 4 | Singapore | 4 | 1 | 0 | 3 | 7 | 9 | −2 | 3 | |
| 5 | Brunei | 4 | 0 | 0 | 4 | 3 | 21 | −18 | 0 | |

Source: AFF
30 July 2018
15:30

| Brunei | 2–3 | Laos |
|---|---|---|
| Idzzaham 1'; Hakeme 38' | Report | Anantaza 12'; Lekto 21'; Chony 48' |

Gelora Joko Samudro Stadium, Gresik
Attendance: 59
Referee: Dwi Purba Wicaksana (Indonesia)
30 July 2018
19:00

| Thailand | 2–1 | Malaysia |
|---|---|---|
| Ali 13' (o.g.); Azlan 64' (o.g.) | Report | Azlan 46' |

Gelora Joko Samudro Stadium, Gresik
Attendance: 212
Referee: Steve Supresencia (Philippines)

1 August 2018
15:30

| Brunei | 0–7 | Thailand |
|---|---|---|
| | Report | Arthit 10'; Thanakrit 17'; Thanarin 21'; Sitthinan 26'; Punnawat 58' (pen.); Panupong 63'; Sattawas 77' |

Gelora Joko Samudro Stadium, Gresik
Attendance: 30
Referee: Ngô Duy Lân (Vietnam)
1 August 2018
19:00

| Singapore | 1–2 | Laos |
|---|---|---|
| Z. Chua 77' | Report | Chony 16', 54' |

Gelora Joko Samudro Stadium, Gresik
Attendance: 51
Referee: Chy Samdy (Cambodia)

3 August 2018
15:30

| Thailand | 3–1 | Singapore |
|---|---|---|
| Thanakrit 13'; Kittiphong 28'; Thodsawat 78' | Report | Z. Chua 69' |

Gelora Joko Samudro Stadium, Gresik
Attendance: 41
Referee: Dwi Purba Wicaksana (Indonesia)
3 August 2018
19:00

| Malaysia | 6–1 | Brunei |
|---|---|---|
| Asman 2', 50'; Fahmi 27'; Ikhwan 38'; Harith 46'; Danial 80+3' | Report | Eddy 79' (pen.) |

Gelora Joko Samudro Stadium, Gresik
Attendance: 48
Referee: Chy Samdy (Cambodia)

5 August 2018
15:30

| Malaysia | 4–0 | Singapore |
|---|---|---|
| Alif 8'; Harith 33'; Fahmi 46'; Ryaan 56' (o.g.) | Report |

Gelora Joko Samudro Stadium, Gresik
Attendance: 95
Referee: Ngô Duy Lân (Vietnam)
5 August 2018
19:00

| Laos | 0–0 | Thailand |
|---|---|---|
| | Report |

Gelora Joko Samudro Stadium, Gresik
Attendance: 69
Referee: Steve Supresencia (Philippines)

7 August 2018
15:30

| Laos | 0–1 | Malaysia |
|---|---|---|
| | Report | Anantaza 4' (o.g.); Fahmi (yellow card) 75' (yellow-red card) 79' |

Gelora Joko Samudro Stadium, Gresik
Attendance: 119
Referee: Chy Samdy (Cambodia)
7 August 2018
19:00

| Singapore | 5–0 | Brunei |
|---|---|---|
| Z. Chua 52', 53'; Rukaifi 59', 78'; Dashan 80' | Report |

Gelora Joko Samudro Stadium, Gresik
Attendance: 63
Referee: Dwi Purba Wicaksana (Indonesia)

== Knockout stage ==
In the knockout stage, the penalty shoot-out was used to decide the winner if necessary.

=== Bracket ===
Semi-finals
9 August – Sidoarjo
Indonesia | 1
Malaysia | 0
9 August – Sidoarjo
Thailand | 1
Myanmar | 0

Final
11 August – Sidoarjo
Indonesia (p) | 1 (4)
Thailand | 1 (3)
Third Place
11 August – Sidoarjo
Malaysia | 1
Myanmar | 0

=== Semi-finals ===
9 August 2018
15:30

| Thailand | 1–0 | Myanmar |
|---|---|---|
| Thanarin 46' | Report |

Gelora Delta Stadium, Sidoarjo
Attendance: 3,951
Referee: Chy Samdy (Cambodia)
9 August 2018
19:00

| Indonesia | 1–0 | Malaysia |
|---|---|---|
| Bagus 72' (pen.) | Report |

Gelora Delta Stadium, Sidoarjo
Attendance: 24,278
Referee: Ngô Duy Lân (Vietnam)

=== Third place match ===
11 August 2018
15:30

| Malaysia | 1–0 | Myanmar |
|---|---|---|
| Alif 79' | Report |

Gelora Delta Stadium, Sidoarjo
Attendance: 5,100
Referee: Wiwat Jumpao-on (Thailand)

=== Final ===
11 August 2018
19:00

| Indonesia | 1–1 | Thailand |
|---|---|---|
| Fajar 33' | Report | Apidet 72' |
Penalties
| Zico (penalty scored); Bagus (penalty scored); Rendy (penalty scored); David (penalty scored) | 4–3 | (penalty scored) Thanarin; (penalty missed) Apidet; (penalty scored) Anucha; (penalty scored) Kittiphong; (penalty missed) Pongsakorn |

Gelora Delta Stadium, Sidoarjo
Attendance: 26,698
Referee: Souei Vongkham (Laos)

== Winner ==
2018 AFF U-16 Youth Championship winners

Indonesia
First title

== Awards ==
| Most Valuable Player | Top Scorer Award | Fair Play Award |
|---|---|---|
| (Thailand) Thanarin Thumsen | (Indonesia) Bagus Kahfi | Thailand |

== Goalscorers ==
13 goals

- (Indonesia) Bagus Kahfi

8 goals

- (Vietnam) Đinh Thanh Trung

4 goals

- (Singapore) Zikos Chua

3 goals

- (Laos) Chony Wenpaserth
- (Myanmar) Naung Naung Soe
- (Vietnam) Nguyễn Quốc Hoàng
- (Indonesia) Sutan Zico

2 goals

- (Cambodia) Bunthoeun Bunnarong
- (Cambodia) Ky Rina
- (Cambodia) Met Samel
- (Indonesia) Mochammad Supriadi
- (Indonesia) Fajar Fathur Rahman
- (Indonesia) Rendy Juliansyah
- (Malaysia) Alif Danial Abdul Aziz
- (Malaysia) Harith Naem Janieh
- (Malaysia) Muhammad Asman Asrul Sukarnain
- (Malaysia) Muhammad Fahmi Danial Mohd Zaaim
- (Myanmar) Aung Ko Oo
- (Myanmar) Khun Kyaw Zin Hein
- (Myanmar) La Min Htwe
- (Myanmar) Naing Htwe
- (Myanmar) Zaw Win Thein
- (Singapore) Muhammad Rukaifi Juraimi
- (Thailand) Thanakrit Laokrai
- (Thailand) Thanarin Thumsen
- (Timor-Leste) Alito da Silva da Cruz
- (Timor-Leste) Osorio Angelo da Costa Gusmão

1 goal

- (Brunei) Mohammad Eddy Shahrol Omar
- (Brunei) Mohammad Idzzaham Aleshahmezan Metali
- (Brunei) Hakeme Yazid Said
- (Cambodia) Lin Daradevid
- (Indonesia) Andre Oktaviansyah
- (Indonesia) David Maulana
- (Indonesia) Komang Teguh Trisnanda
- (Laos) Anantaza Siphongphan
- (Laos) Lekto Louang-aphay
- (Malaysia) Mohammad Ikhwan Mohd Hafiz
- (Malaysia) Muhammad Danial Amali
- (Malaysia) Muhammad Nuh Azlan Shah Mohd Yusof
- (Myanmar) Pyae Phyo Aung
- (Myanmar) Wai Yan Soe
- (Myanmar) Yan Kyaw Soe
- (Philippines) Antoine Ortega
- (Philippines) Renard Yu
- (Philippines) Sandro Reyes
- (Singapore) K. Dashan
- (Thailand) Apidet Jan-ngam
- (Thailand) Arthit Buangam
- (Thailand) Kittiphong Khetpara
- (Thailand) Panupong Wannatong
- (Thailand) Punnawat Chotjirachaithon
- (Thailand) Sattawas Leela
- (Thailand) Sitthinan Rungrueang
- (Thailand) Thodsawat Aunkongrat
- (Timor-Leste) Aldo Amaral
- (Timor-Leste) Ejivanio Ferreira da Costa
- (Timor-Leste) Joel Gomez
- (Vietnam) Đậu Ngọc Thành
- (Vietnam) Đoàn Chí Bảo
- (Vietnam) Hoàng Văn Thông
- (Vietnam) Trịnh Văn Chung

1 own goal

- (Cambodia) Ry Leap Pheng (against Myanmar)
- (Laos) Anantaza Siphongphan (against Malaysia)
- (Malaysia) Ali Imran Sukari (against Thailand)
- (Malaysia) Muhammad Nuh Azlan Shah Mohd Yusof (against Thailand)
- (Philippines) Jaime Rosquillo (against Timor-Leste)
- (Singapore) Ryaan Sanizal (against Malaysia)
