= Zikos Chua =

Singaporean footballer

Personal information
- Full name: Vasileios Zikos Chua Ming Xun
- Date of birth: 15 April 2002 (age 24)
- Place of birth: Kastoria, Greece
- Height: 1.84 m (6 ft 0 in)
- Position: Forward

Team information
- Current team: Balestier Khalsa
- Number: 19

Youth career
- 2014–2017: National Football Academy
- 2017–2018: Geylang International

Senior career*
Years	Team	Apps	(Gls)
2018–2021	Geylang International	21	(5)
2022–2023	→ Young Lions (loan)	23	(9)
2023–2024	Geylang International	21	(4)
2025–2026	Tampines Rovers	7	(1)
2026–2027	Balestier Khalsa	3	(0)

International career^{‡}
2016	Singapore U14		
2017–2018	Singapore U16	10	(8)
2019–2020	Singapore U19	1	(0)
2019–	Singapore U23	11	(1)
Medal record
Men's football
Representing Singapore
Merlion Cup
Winner	2019 Singapore
- * Club domestic league appearances and goals as of 21 November 2026 ‡ National team caps and goals as of 17:14, 3 November 2019 (UTC)

Vasileios Zikos Chua Ming Xun (born 15 April 2002) is a Singaporean professional footballer who plays as a forward for Singapore Premier League club Balestier Khalsa.

Chua holds the record of being the youngest player to score four goals in a single Singapore Premier League's match history at 20 years and 114 days.

== Early life ==
Chua was born in Greece to a Greek mother and a Chinese Singaporean father and grew up in Kastoria, Macedonia, Greece, with his younger brother, before returning to Singapore when he was 10. He was a student at Tanjong Katong Secondary School when he made his first bow as a professional footballer. Chua studied at Nanyang Junior College.

== Club career ==
=== Youth ===
Chua started his career with the National Football Academy before he was signed by former Geylang International head coach Mohd Noor Ali for the club's Under-19 side in 2017. He has also represented Singapore at various levels and was nominated for The New Paper Dollah Kassim Award in 2017.

While playing for the National Football Academy, Chua was also representing his school, Tanjong Katong Secondary School, in the National "C" Division, scoring 26 goals in 2016 to help his school win the title. He was named in Goal Singapore's 2020 NxGn list following his sublime performances for Geylang International.

=== Geylang International ===
On 4 July 2018, Chua came on as a late substitute in Geylang International's 3–1 win over Young Lions at Jalan Besar Stadium for his professional debut at the age of 16, Chua eclipsed the previous record set by Hariss Harun as the youngest ever debutant in the Singapore Premier League. He was the youngest player to ever play in the country's top tier of soccer and is the third-youngest scorer in the history of Singapore's professional league.

On 14 April 2019, Chua became the third youngest scorer in Singapore Premier League history, at 16 years and 364 days, after Hariss Harun and Fareez Farhan. He would than scored a brace in a 2–1 win over Warriors FC on 23 June 2019. Chua kept his exploits by becoming the youngest player ever to reach the five-goal mark in league history, at 17 years and 102 days on 27 July 2019. As of April 2020, Chua has scored 5 goals in 13 matches for the Eagles. His talent would not go un-noticed as he was picked up by J.League side Matsumoto Yamaga on a training stint.

However Chua would suffer an ACL injury in 2019, setting him back.

Chua would returned to Geylang International on 14 January 2024 after he completed his National Services. On 14 June 2024, he scored a brace in a 6–2 win over Hougang United.

==== Young Lions (loan) ====
In January 2022, Chua joined Young Lions on loan while serving his compulsory National Services with the Singapore Armed Forces. He scored his first goal for the club on 19 March 2022 in a 4–3 lost against Balestier Khalsa. On 7 August 2022, Chua scored a poker in a 4–2 win over Tanjong Pagar United which was also his first career hat-trick. However, on 24 August 2022, he suffered a Cruciate ligament injury which ruled him out for a year.

On 29 July 2023, Chua returned to action coming on as a substitution and scoring a goal in a 6–2 lost against Hougang United.

== International career ==
Chua was born in Greece to a Greek mother and a Chinese Singaporean father which make him eligible to represent Greece or Singapore at international level.

=== Youth ===
Chua was first called up to the Singapore U22 in 2019 for the 2019 Merlion Cup. He made his debut for the team on 7 June 2019, in a 3–0 win against Philippines U23.

On 31 July 2019, Singapore U18 head coach Fadzuhasny Juraimi named Chua in the Singapore squad for 2019 AFF U18 Youth Championship.

== Personal life ==
Chua younger brother, Christos Chua is also a professional footballer currently playing for Geylang International under-21 side while serving his National Services.

== Career statistics ==
=== Club ===
As of 21 November 2026.

Club	Season	League			Cup		Continental		Other		Total	
Club	Season	Division	Apps	Goals	Apps	Goals	Apps	Goals	Apps	Goals	Apps	Goals
Geylang International	2018	S.League	2	0	0	0	–		0	0	2	0
Geylang International	2019	Singapore Premier League	11	5	0	0	–		0	0	11	5
Geylang International	2020	Singapore Premier League	6	0	0	0	0	0	0	0	6	0
Geylang International	2021	Singapore Premier League	2	0	0	0	0	0	0	0	2	0
Geylang International	Total		21	5	0	0	0	0	0	0	21	5
Young Lions	2022	Singapore Premier League	19	8	0	0	0	0	0	0	19	8
Young Lions	2023	Singapore Premier League	4	1	1	0	0	0	0	0	5	1
Young Lions	Total		23	9	1	0	0	0	0	0	24	9
Geylang International	2024–25	Singapore Premier League	21	4	1	0	0	0	0	0	22	4
Geylang International	Total		21	4	1	0	0	0	0	0	22	4
Tampines Rovers	2025–26	Singapore Premier League	7	1	0	0	1	0	1	0	9	1
Tampines Rovers	Total		7	1	0	0	1	0	1	0	9	1
Balestier Khalsa	2026–27	Singapore Premier League	3	0	0	0	0	0	0	0	3	0
Balestier Khalsa	Total		3	0	0	0	0	0	0	0	3	0
Career total			75	19	2	0	1	0	1	0	79	19

=== International ===
==== U23 International caps ====
No	Date	Venue	Opponent	Result	Competition
1	7 June 2019	Jalan Besar Stadium, Kallang, Singapore	Philippines	3-0 (won)	2019 Merlion Cup
2	9 June 2019	Jalan Besar Stadium, Kallang, Singapore	Thailand	1-0 (won)	2019 Merlion Cup
3	25 October 2021	Jalan Besar Stadium, Jalan Besar, Singapore	Timor-Leste	2-2 (draw)	2022 AFC U-23 Asian Cup qualification
4	28 October 2021	Jalan Besar Stadium, Jalan Besar, Singapore	Philippines	1-0 (won)	2022 AFC U-23 Asian Cup qualification
5	7 May 2022	Thiên Trường Stadium, Nam Định, Vietnam	Laos	2–2 (draw)	2021 Southeast Asian Games
6	9 May 2022	Thiên Trường Stadium, Nam Định, Vietnam	Thailand	0–5 (lost)	2021 Southeast Asian Games
7	11 May 2022	Thiên Trường Stadium, Nam Định, Vietnam	Cambodia	1–0 (won)	2021 Southeast Asian Games
8	14 May 2022	Thiên Trường Stadium, Nam Định, Vietnam	Malaysia	2–2 (draw)	2021 Southeast Asian Games
9	6 Sept 2023	Việt Trì Stadium, Phú Thọ, Vietnam	Yemen	0-3 (lost)	2024 AFC U-23 Asian Cup qualification
10	9 Sept 2023	Việt Trì Stadium, Phú Thọ, Vietnam	Guam	1-1 (draw)	2024 AFC U-23 Asian Cup qualification
11	11 Sept 2023	Việt Trì Stadium, Phú Thọ, Vietnam	Vietnam	2-2 (draw)	2024 AFC U-23 Asian Cup qualification

==== U19 International caps ====
No	Date	Venue	Opponent	Result	Competition
1	7 August 2019	Thanh Long Stadium, Ho Chi Minh City, Vietnam	Thailand	1-1 (draw)	2019 AFF U-18 Youth Championship

==== U16 International caps ====
No	Date	Venue	Opponent	Result	Competition
1	17 March 2017	Po Kong Village Road Park, Hong Kong	Hong Kong	0-6 (lost)	2017 Jockey Cup
2	18 March 2017	Po Kong Village Road Park, Hong Kong	Thailand	1-5 (lost)	2017 Jockey Cup
3	19 March 2017	Po Kong Village Road Park, Hong Kong	Qatar	3-0 (won)	2017 Jockey Cup
4	20 September 2017	Wibawa Mukti Stadium, Indonesia	Malaysia	1-6 (lost)	2018 AFC U-16 Championship qualification
5	22 September 2017	Wibawa Mukti Stadium, Indonesia	Japan	0-11 (lost)	2018 AFC U-16 Championship qualification
6	24 September 2017	Wibawa Mukti Stadium, Indonesia	Guam	8-1 (won)	2018 AFC U-16 Championship qualification
7	1 August 2018	Gelora Joko Samudro Stadium, Indonesia	Laos	1-2 (lost)	2018 AFF U-16 Youth Championship
8	3 August 2018	Gelora Joko Samudro Stadium, Indonesia	Thailand	1-2 (lost)	2018 AFF U-16 Youth Championship
9	5 August 2018	Gelora Joko Samudro Stadium, Indonesia	Malaysia	0-4 (lost)	2018 AFF U-16 Youth Championship
10	7 August 2018	Gelora Joko Samudro Stadium, Indonesia	Brunei	5-0 (won)	2018 AFF U-16 Youth Championship

==== U16 International goals ====
No	Date	Venue	Opponent	Score	Result	Competition
1	19 March 2017	Po Kong Village Road Park, Hong Kong	Qatar	1-0	3-0 (won)	2017 Jockey Cup
2	19 March 2017	Po Kong Village Road Park, Hong Kong	Qatar	3-0	3-0 (won)	2017 Jockey Cup
3	24 September 2017	Wibawa Mukti Stadium, Indonesia	Guam	5-0	8-1 (won)	2018 AFC U-16 Championship qualification
4	24 September 2017	Wibawa Mukti Stadium, Indonesia	Guam	8-1	9-1 (won)	2018 AFC U-16 Championship qualification
5	1 August 2018	Gelora Joko Samudro Stadium, Indonesia	Laos	1-2	1-2 (lost)	2018 AFF U-16 Youth Championship
6	3 August 2018	Gelora Joko Samudro Stadium, Indonesia	Thailand	1-2	1-3 (lost)	2018 AFF U-16 Youth Championship
7	7 August 2018	Gelora Joko Samudro Stadium, Indonesia	Brunei	1-0	5-0 (won)	2018 AFF U-16 Youth Championship
8	7 August 2018	Gelora Joko Samudro Stadium, Indonesia	Brunei	2-0	5-0 (won)	2018 AFF U-16 Youth Championship

== Honours ==
=== International ===
Singapore U22

- Merlion Cup: 2019
