= Bagus Kahfi =

Indonesian footballer (born 2002)

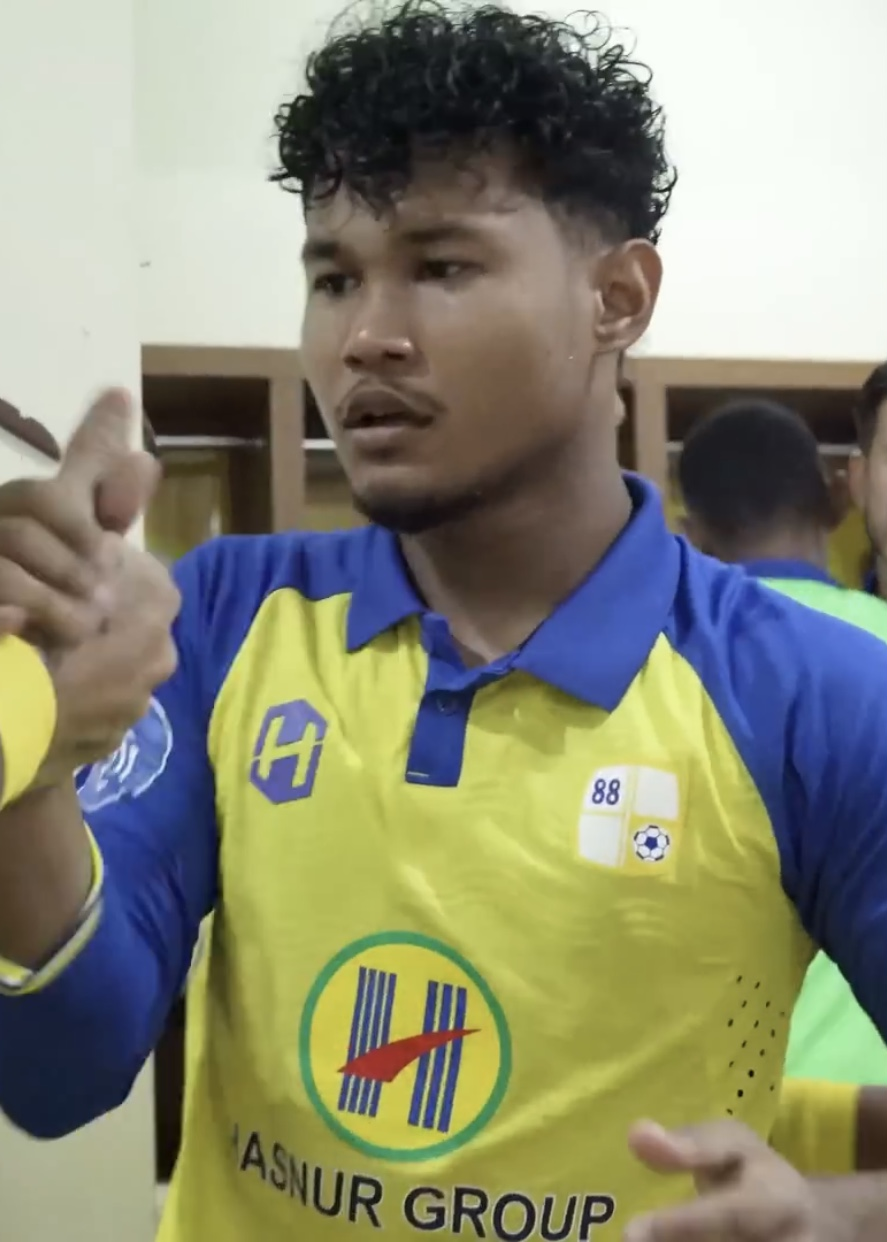
- Kahfi with Barito Putera in 2023

Personal information
- Full name: Amiruddin Bagus Kahfi Alfikri
- Date of birth: 16 January 2002 (age 24)
- Place of birth: Magelang, Indonesia
- Height: 1.69 m (5 ft 7 in)
- Position: Forward

Team information
- Current team: Barito Putera
- Number: 22

Youth career
- 2015–2016: Frenz United
- 2016–2018: PSSA Asahan
- 2018–2021: Barito Putera

Senior career*
Years	Team	Apps	(Gls)
2021–2022	Jong Utrecht	2	(0)
2022–2023	Asteras Tripolis	0	(0)
2023–	Barito Putera	52	(3)

International career
2017–2018	Indonesia U16	16	(17)
2019	Indonesia U19	6	(6)
2021	Indonesia U23	4	(1)
Medal record
Men's football
Representing Indonesia
AFF U-16 Youth Championship
Winner	2018 Indonesia
AFF U-19 Youth Championship
Third place	2019 Vietnam
- * Club domestic league appearances and goals as of 3 May 2026

Amiruddin Bagus Kahfi Alfikri (born 16 January 2002) is an Indonesian professional footballer who plays as a forward for Liga 2 club Barito Putera.

== Club career ==
Bagus Kahfi is a former youth academy player of PSSA Asahan and Barito Putera. On 5 February 2021, he joined Eredivisie club Utrecht on a contract until June 2022. This made him the first Indonesian footballer to sign a professional contract with a Dutch club. He made his professional debut for club's reserve side Jong Utrecht on 27 August 2021 in a 3–0 league win against Telstar.

On 22 August 2022, Kahfi signed for Greek Super League club Asteras Tripolis, until June 2023.

== International career ==
Bagus Kahfi started to represent Indonesia from the age of 15 when he debuted in an Indonesia U15 team match against Myanmar U15 in the 2017 AFF U-15 Youth Championship. He was part of Indonesia squad that won the 2018 AFF U-16 Youth Championship.

In October 2021, Bagus was called up to the Indonesia U23 in a friendly match against Tajikistan and Nepal and also prepared for 2022 AFC U-23 Asian Cup qualification in Tajikistan by Shin Tae-yong. Bagus made his debut for Indonesia U23, on 19 October 2021, by starting in a 2–1 win against Tajikistan U23.

== Personal life ==
Bagus Kahfi was born in Magelang, Central Java. He is the twin brother of Bagas Kaffa who plays for Liga 1 club Barito Putera.

== Career statistics ==
As of 3 May 2026

Appearances and goals by club, season and competition
Club	Season	League			Cup		Other		Total	
Club	Season	Division	Apps	Goals	Apps	Goals	Apps	Goals	Apps	Goals
Jong Utrecht	2021–22	Eerste Divisie	2	0	—		—		2	0
Asteras Tripolis	2022–23	Super League Greece	0	0	0	0	—		0	0
Barito Putera	2023–24	Liga 1	33	2	0	0	—		33	2
Barito Putera	2024–25	Liga 1	16	0	0	0	—		16	0
Barito Putera	2025–26	Championship	3	1	0	0	—		3	1
Career total			54	3	0	0	0	0	54	3

== International goals ==
=== Indonesia U17 ===
No.	Date	Venue	Opponent	Score	Result	Competition
1.	13 July 2017	Chonburi, Thailand	Australia	1–0	3–7	2017 AFF U-15 Championship
2.	13 July 2017	Chonburi, Thailand	Australia	2–0	3–7	2017 AFF U-15 Championship
3.	13 July 2017	Chonburi, Thailand	Australia	3–6	3–7	2017 AFF U-15 Championship
4.	16 September 2017	Bangkok, Thailand	Northern Mariana Islands	2–0	18–0	2018 AFC U-16 Championship qualification
5.	16 September 2017	Bangkok, Thailand	Northern Mariana Islands	5–0	18–0	2018 AFC U-16 Championship qualification
6.	16 September 2017	Bangkok, Thailand	Northern Mariana Islands	6–0	18–0	2018 AFC U-16 Championship qualification
7.	29 July 2018	Sidoarjo, Indonesia	Philippines	6–0	8–0	2018 AFF U-16 Youth Championship
8.	29 July 2018	Sidoarjo, Indonesia	Philippines	7–0	8–0	2018 AFF U-16 Youth Championship
9.	29 July 2018	Sidoarjo, Indonesia	Philippines	8–0	8–0	2018 AFF U-16 Youth Championship
10.	31 July 2018	Sidoarjo, Indonesia	Myanmar	1–0	2–1	2018 AFF U-16 Youth Championship
11.	31 July 2018	Sidoarjo, Indonesia	Myanmar	2–0	2–1	2018 AFF U-16 Youth Championship
12.	2 August 2018	Sidoarjo, Indonesia	Vietnam	2–1	4–2	2018 AFF U-16 Youth Championship
13.	2 August 2018	Sidoarjo, Indonesia	Vietnam	3–1	4–2	2018 AFF U-16 Youth Championship
14.	4 August 2018	Sidoarjo, Indonesia	Timor-Leste	1–0	3–0	2018 AFF U-16 Youth Championship
15.	4 August 2018	Sidoarjo, Indonesia	Timor-Leste	3–0	3–0	2018 AFF U-16 Youth Championship
16.	6 August 2018	Sidoarjo, Indonesia	Cambodia	2–0	4–0	2018 AFF U-16 Youth Championship
17.	6 August 2018	Sidoarjo, Indonesia	Cambodia	3–0	4–0	2018 AFF U-16 Youth Championship
18.	6 August 2018	Sidoarjo, Indonesia	Cambodia	4–0	4–0	2018 AFF U-16 Youth Championship
19.	8 August 2018	Sidoarjo, Indonesia	Malaysia	1–0	1–0	2018 AFF U-16 Youth Championship
20.	21 September 2018	Kuala Lumpur, Malaysia	Iran	1–0	2–0	2018 AFC U-16 Championship

=== Indonesia U19 ===
No.	Date	Venue	Opponent	Score	Result	Competition
1.	6 August 2019	Dĩ An, Vietnam	Philippines	3–0	7–1	2019 AFF U-18 Youth Championship
2.	6 August 2019	Dĩ An, Vietnam	Philippines	4–0	7–1	2019 AFF U-18 Youth Championship
3.	10 August 2019	Thủ Dầu Một, Vietnam	Brunei	1–0	6–1	2019 AFF U-18 Youth Championship
4.	10 August 2019	Thủ Dầu Một, Vietnam	Brunei	6–1	6–1	2019 AFF U-18 Youth Championship
5.	12 August 2019	Thủ Dầu Một, Vietnam	Laos	1–1	2–1	2019 AFF U-18 Youth Championship
6.	17 August 2019	Thủ Dầu Một, Vietnam	Malaysia	1–1	3–4 (a.e.t.)	2019 AFF U-18 Youth Championship

=== Indonesia U23 ===
No.	Date	Venue	Opponent	Score	Result	Competition
1.	19 October 2021	Dushanbe, Tajikistan	Tajikistan	2–1	2–1	Friendly

== Honours ==
Indonesia U16

- AFF U-16 Youth Championship: 2018

Indonesia U19

- AFF U-19 Youth Championship third place: 2019

Individual

- AFF U-16 Youth Championship Top scorer: 2018
- AFF U-19 Youth Championship Top scorer: 2019
- Liga 1 Young Player of the Month: December 2023
