= Sitthinan Rungrueang =

Thai footballer

Personal information
- Full name: Sitthinan Rungrueang
- Date of birth: 10 August 2002 (age 24)
- Place of birth: Suphan Buri, Thailand
- Height: 1.75 m (5 ft 9 in)
- Positions: Forward; winger

Team information
- Current team: Suphanburi
- Number: 10

Youth career
- 2014–2018: Ratchaburi Mitr Phol

Senior career*
Years	Team	Apps	(Gls)
2019–2023	Ratchaburi Mitr Phol	2	(0)
2020	→ Muangkan United (loan)	9	(1)
2022–2023	→ Suphanburi (loan)	13	(1)
2023–	Suphanburi	40	(5)

International career
2018	Thailand U16		
2018	Thailand U17		
2019–2022	Thailand U19		
2024–	Thailand U23	2	(0)
- * Club domestic league appearances and goals as of 26 April 2025

Sitthinan Rungrueang (Thai: สิทธินันท์ รุ่งเรือง; born 10 July 2002) is a Thai professional footballer who plays as a forward or a winger for Thai League 2 club Suphanburi.

== International goals ==
=== Thailand U16 ===
No.	Date	Venue	Opponent	Score	Result	Competition
1.	1 August 2018	Gelora Joko Samudro Stadium, Gresik, Indonesia	Brunei	4–0	7–0	2018 AFF U-16 Youth Championship

=== Thailand U19 ===
No.	Date	Venue	Opponent	Score	Result	Competition
1.	23 March 2019	Nha Trang Stadium, Nha Trang, Vietnam	China	2–0	2–1	Friendly
2.	15 August 2019	Thong Nhat Stadium, Ho Chi Minh City, Vietnam	Malaysia	1–0	1–0	2019 AFF U-18 Youth Championship
