= Bagas Kaffa =

Indonesian footballer

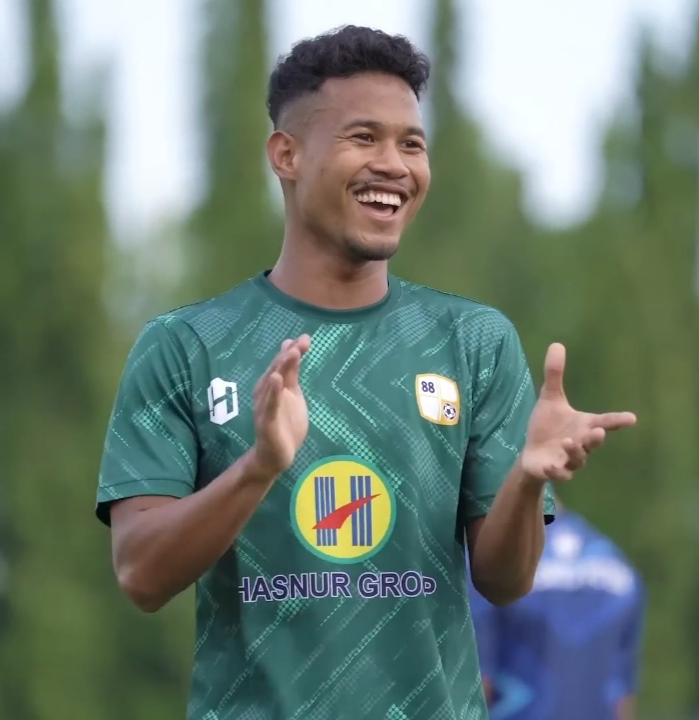
- Bagas training with Barito Putera in 2023

Personal information
- Full name: Amiruddin Bagas Kaffa Arrizqi
- Date of birth: 16 January 2002 (age 24)
- Place of birth: Magelang, Indonesia
- Height: 1.70 m (5 ft 7 in)
- Position: Right-back

Team information
- Current team: Semen Padang
- Number: 2

Youth career
- 2015–2016: PPLPD Musi Banyuasin
- 2016–2017: Frenz United
- 2017: PSSA Asahan
- 2017: PPLP Sumatra Utara
- 2017–2018: Chelsea Soccer School
- 2018: PPLP Jawa Tengah
- 2018–2019: Barito Putera

Senior career*
| Years | Team | Apps | (Gls) |
| 2020–2026 | Barito Putera | 121 | (4) |
| 2026– | Semen Padang | 1 | (0) |

International career^{‡}
| 2017–2018 | Indonesia U16 | 13 | (1) |
| 2019–2020 | Indonesia U19 | 6 | (0) |
| 2023–2024 | Indonesia U23 | 12 | (0) |
Medal record
Men's football
Representing Indonesia
AFF U-16 Youth Championship
| Winner | 2018 Indonesia |
AFF U-19 Youth Championship
| Third place | 2019 Vietnam |
Southeast Asian Games
| Gold medal – first place | 2023 Cambodia | Team |
AFF U-23 Championship
| Runner-up | 2023 Thailand | Team |
- * Club domestic league appearances and goals as of 22:15, 13 September 2026 (UTC+7) ‡ National team caps and goals as of 19:15, 9 May 2024 (UTC+7)

Amiruddin Bagas Kaffa Arrizqi (born 16 January 2002) is an Indonesian professional footballer who plays as a right-back for Championship club Semen Padang.

== Club career ==
=== Barito Putera ===
At a young age, he has already had the opportunity to play for PS Barito Putera. Bagas Kaffa agreed a contract with Barito Putera in 2019. Even his contract was extended until 2023. He is determined to win a position as a regular player at Laskar Antasari. Bagas Kaffa made his first-team debut on 6 March 2020 as a starting in a match against Bali United where he played the full 90 minutes as a right back. This season was suspended on 27 March 2020 due to the COVID-19 pandemic. The season was abandoned and was declared void on 20 January 2021.

On 27 September 2021, Bagas Kaffa provided an assist for Aleksandar Rakić in a 0–2 win over PSM Makassar. On 19 November, Bagas Kaffa scored his first league goal for Barito Putera in a 4–1 win over Persiraja Banda Aceh. Bagas Kaffa's impressive performance made him enter the Best XI of 2021–22 Liga 1. Throughout the season, he recorded 32 appearances, scored 1 goal and 4 assists.

Ahead of the 2022–23 season, Bagas Kaffa was linked with a move to Persija Jakarta, but he eventually stayed at the club. Despite this, he became a regular starter for Barito Putera under Rahmad Darmawan, and saw an improvement in his performances for the side. Bagas Kaffa scored his first goal of the season for Laskar Antasari on 29 September 2022, a last-minute effort in a match against Persik Kediri to equalise 2–2. On 24 December, Bagas Kaffa provided an assist for his compatriot Rafael Silva in a 0–3 win against Persita Tangerang at Maguwoharjo Stadium. Bagas Kaffa was fixed in the starting eleven throughout the season, playing almost the same number of games between the right-back and the right-midfield. His stable performance earned him a call-up to the Indonesia U23 which will be prepared to play in the upcoming 2023 Southeast Asian Games.

== International career ==
Bagas Kaffa started to represent Indonesia from the age of 15 when he debuted for the Indonesia U15 team in a match against Myanmar U15 in the 2017 AFF U-15 Youth Championship.

Bagas Kaffa was also part of the Indonesia U17 team that won the 2018 AFF U-16 Youth Championship, after in the final match against Thailand U17, winning the penalty-shootout. On 21 September, he scored his first international goal for Garuda Muda, with his acceleration past four opposing players against Iran U17 in the 2018 AFC U-16 Championship. The game ended in a 2–0 victory for Indonesia. He was awarded as the player with the best goal during the 2018 AFC U-16 Championship.

Bagas Kaffa was part of the Indonesia U-19 team that finished third in 2019 AFF U-19 Youth Championship.

In April 2023, Bagas Kaffa was called up to the Indonesia U22 for the training centre in preparation for 2023 SEA Games. Bagas Kaffa made his international U22 debut on 14 April 2023 in a friendly match against Lebanon U22 at Gelora Bung Karno Stadium, Jakarta.

== Career statistics ==
=== Club ===
As of 25 April 2026

| Club | Season | League | | | Cup | | Continental | | Other | | Total | |
| Club | Season | Division | Apps | Goals | Apps | Goals | Apps | Goals | Apps | Goals | Apps | Goals |
|---|---|---|---|---|---|---|---|---|---|---|---|---|
| Barito Putera | 2020 | Liga 1 | 2 | 0 | 0 | 0 | – | | 0 | 0 | 2 | 0 |
| Barito Putera | 2021–22 | Liga 1 | 32 | 1 | 0 | 0 | – | | 4 (Note: Appearances in Menpora Cup) | 0 | 36 | 1 |
| Barito Putera | 2022–23 | Liga 1 | 30 | 1 | 0 | 0 | – | | 5 (Note: Appearances in Indonesia President's Cup) | 0 | 35 | 1 |
| Barito Putera | 2023–24 | Liga 1 | 21 | 2 | 0 | 0 | – | | 0 | 0 | 21 | 2 |
| Barito Putera | 2024–25 | Liga 1 | 23 | 0 | 0 | 0 | – | | 0 | 0 | 23 | 0 |
| Barito Putera | 2025–26 | Championship | 13 | 0 | 0 | 0 | – | | 0 | 0 | 13 | 0 |
| Career total | | | 121 | 4 | 0 | 0 | 0 | 0 | 9 | 0 | 130 | 4 |

== Personal life ==
He is the twin brother of footballer Bagus Kahfi.

== Honours ==
Indonesia U-16

- Tien Phong Plastic Cup: 2017
- JENESYS Japan-ASEAN U-16 Youth Football Tournament: 2017
- AFF U-16 Youth Championship: 2018

Indonesia U-19

- AFF U-19 Youth Championship third place: 2019

Indonesia U-23

- SEA Games gold medal: 2023
- AFF U-23 Championship runner-up: 2023

Individual

- Liga 1 Young Player of the Month: September 2021, November 2021, February 2022
- Liga 1 Team of the Season: 2021–22
