= Andre Oktaviansyah =

Indonesian footballer

Personal information
- Full name: Andre Oktaviansyah
- Date of birth: 23 October 2002 (age 24)
- Place of birth: Depok, Indonesia
- Height: 1.60 m (5 ft 3 in)
- Position: Defensive midfielder

Team information
- Current team: Kendal Tornado
- Number: 8

Youth career
- 2010–2018: Pelita Jaya
- 2018–2019: PS TIRA
- 2019–2020: Garuda Select

Senior career*
Years	Team	Apps	(Gls)
2021–2022	Persikabo 1973	25	(0)
2022–2025	Persebaya Surabaya	52	(1)
2025	PSBS Biak	6	(1)
2026	Bekasi City	8	(0)
2026–	Kendal Tornado	0	(0)

International career^{‡}
2017–2018	Indonesia U16	15	(1)
2020–2021	Indonesia U19	2	(0)
Medal record
Men's football
Representing Indonesia
AFF U-16 Youth Championship
Winner	2018 Indonesia
- * Club domestic league appearances and goals as of 18 April 2026 ‡ National team caps and goals as of 19 August 2019

Andre Oktaviansyah (born 23 October 2002) is an Indonesian professional footballer who plays as a defensive midfielder for Championship club Kendal Tornado.

== Club career ==
=== Persikabo 1973 ===
He was signed by Persikabo 1973 to play in Liga 1 in the 2021 season. Andre made his first-team debut on 3 September 2021 as a substitute in a match against Madura United at the Indomilk Arena, Tangerang.

=== Persebaya Surabaya ===
Andre was signed by Persebaya Surabaya to play in Liga 1 in the 2022–23 season. He made his league debut on 19 August 2022 in a match against Borneo Samarinda at the Segiri Stadium, Samarinda.

== International career ==
Andre was part of the Indonesia U-16 team that won the 2018 AFF U-16 Youth Championship. In August 2020, Andre was included in the Indonesia national under-19 football team 30-man list for the Training Center in Croatia.

== Honours ==
=== International ===
Indonesia U16

- JENESYS Japan-ASEAN U-16 Youth Football Tournament: 2017
- AFF U-16 Youth Championship: 2018
