= Jun Nishikawa (footballer) =

Japanese footballer (born 2002)

Jun Nishikawa 西川 潤
Personal information
- Full name: Jun Nishikawa
- Date of birth: 21 February 2002 (age 24)
- Place of birth: Kawasaki, Kanagawa, Japan
- Height: 1.80 m (5 ft 11 in)
- Positions: Winger; attacking midfielder

Team information
- Current team: Fagiano Okayama
- Number: 66

Youth career
- Aoba FC Yokohama
- Yokohama F. Marinos
- 2017–2019: Toko Gakuen High School

Senior career*
Years	Team	Apps	(Gls)
2019–2025	Cerezo Osaka	31	(1)
2019	→ Cerezo Osaka U-23 (loan)	1	(0)
2022–2023	→ Sagan Tosu (loan)	35	(1)
2024	→ Iwaki FC (loan)	35	(3)
2025	→ Sagan Tosu (loan)	35	(6)
2026–	Fagiano Okayama	8	(0)

International career^{‡}
2017–2018	Japan U16	4	(0)
2019	Japan U17	4	(2)
2019	Japan U20	6	(0)
2022–2023	Japan U21	3	(0)
2023	Japan U22	2	(0)
2023	Japan U23	4	(0)
Medal record
Men's football
Representing Japan
AFC U-16 Championship
Winner	2018 Malaysia
Asian Games
Silver medal – second place	2022 Hangzhou	Team
- * Club domestic league appearances and goals as of 12 August 2026 ‡ National team caps and goals as of 7 October 2023

Jun Nishikawa (西川 潤, Nishikawa Jun; born 21 February 2002) is a Japanese professional footballer who plays as a winger or an attacking midfielder for J1 League club Fagiano Okayama.

== Career ==
On 8 January 2025, Nishikawa was announced at Sagan Tosu on a one year loan.

== Career statistics ==
As of 25 March 2026.

Appearances and goals by club, season and competition
Club	Season	League			National cup (Note: Includes Emperors Cup)		League cup (Note: Includes J.League Cup)		Continental		Total	
Club	Season	Division	Apps	Goals	Apps	Goals	Apps	Goals	Apps	Goals	Apps	Goals
Cerezo Osaka	2019	J1 League	1	0	0	0	2	0	0	0	3	0
Cerezo Osaka	2020	J1 League	13	1	0	0	2	0	0	0	15	1
Cerezo Osaka	2021	J1 League	17	0	2	0	1	0	1 (Note: Appearances in AFC Champions League Elite)	0	21	0
Cerezo Osaka	Total		31	1	2	0	5	0	1	0	39	1
Cerezo Osaka U-23 (loan)	2019	J3 League	1	0	–		–		–		1	0
Sagan Tosu (loan)	2022	J1 League	14	1	2	0	1	1	–		17	2
Sagan Tosu (loan)	2023	J1 League	21	0	1	1	3	0	–		25	1
Sagan Tosu (loan)	Total		35	1	3	1	4	1	0	0	42	3
Iwaki FC (loan)	2024	J2 League	35	3	2	0	0	0	–		37	3
Sagan Tosu (loan)	2025	J2 League	35	6	2	0	1	0	–		38	6
Career total			137	11	9	1	10	1	1	0	157	13

== Honours ==
Japan U16

- AFC U-16 Championship: 2018

Individual

- AFC U-16 Championship MVP: 2018
