= Thailand national under-17 football team =

Thailand Under-17
- Nickname(s): ช้างศึก (Changsuek) (War elephants)
- Association: Football Association of Thailand
- Confederation: AFC (Asia)
- Sub-confederation: AFF (Southeast Asia)
- Head coach: Wasapol Kaewpaluk
- Captain: Worawit Boonthaokaeo
- Home stadium: Rajamangala Stadium
- FIFA code: THA
First colours	Second colours	Third colours

Biggest win
- Brunei 0–19 Thailand (Chonburi, Thailand; 25 October 2024)

FIFA U-17 World Cup
- Appearances: 2 (first in 1997)
- Best result: Round 1 (1997, 1999)

AFC U-17 Asian Cup
- Appearances: 11 (first in 1985)
- Best result: Champions (1998)

The Thailand national under-17 football team is the national team for the under-17 level, representing Thailand in international football competitions in the FIFA U-17 World Cup, AFC U-17 Asian Cup and AFF U-16 Championship. It is controlled by the Football Association of Thailand.

Thailand was AFC champions in 1998 and three-time AFF champions. Thailand has also managed to qualify for the FIFA U-17 World Cup in 1997—becoming the first Southeast Asian team to qualify by merit to a FIFA tournament—and 1999.

== Results and fixtures ==
Win Draw Lose

=== 2026 ===
25 March 2026 Friendly	Thailand	2–2	India	Lopburi, Thailand
17:30 IST				Stadium: Phra Ramesuan Stadium

12 April 2026 ASEAN U-17 Boys' Championship GS	Thailand	5–1	Philippines	Gresik, Indonesia
15:30	Worawit 9'; Pattarawee 28'; Thodsadon 39'; Sathaporn 62'; Bacara 65' (o.g.)	Report	Long 79'	Stadium: Gelora Joko Samudro Stadium; Referee: Yusuke Ohashi (Japan)

15 April 2026 ASEAN U-17 Boys' Championship GS	Myanmar	1–0	Thailand	Gresik, Indonesia
19:30	Aung Thiha 53'	Report		Stadium: Gelora Joko Samudro Stadium; Referee: Resul Mämmedow (Turkmenistan)

18 April 2026 ASEAN U-17 Boys' Championship GS	Thailand	2–3	Laos	Gresik, Indonesia
15:30	Viphusit 14'; Kouakou 62'	Report	Anoulak 54'; Sisombat 72', 76'	Stadium: Gelora Joko Samudro Stadium; Referee: Meder Taichiev (Kyrgyzstan)

5 May 2026 AFC U-17 Asian Cup GS	Tajikistan	2–0	Thailand	Jeddah, Saudi Arabia
23:00 IST	Phetcharayut 1' (o.g.); Sanginov 90+7'	Report		Stadium: King Abdullah Sports City Training Stadium (Pitch B); Attendance: 25; Referee: Yahya Al-Balushi (Oman)

9 May 2026 AFC U-17 Asian Cup GS	Thailand	0–2	Saudi Arabia	Jeddah, Saudi Arabia
10:30 IST		Report	Al-Yami 4'; Al-Okrush 90+2'	Stadium: King Abdullah Sports City Training Stadium (Pitch B); Attendance: 150; Referee: Clarence Leow (Singapore)

12 May 2026 AFC U-17 Asian Cup GS	Thailand	2–2	Myanmar	Jeddah, Saudi Arabia
10:30 IST	Pakorn 30'; David 75'	Report	Sai Myat Min 19', 22'	Stadium: King Abdullah Sports City Training Stadium (Pitch B); Referee: Veronika Bernatskaia (Kyrgyzstan)

1 November 2026 Friendly	Thailand	1–1	Iran	Pathum Thani, Thailand
19:00

11 November 2026 2027 AFC U-17 Asian Cup Q	Chinese Taipei	1–4	Thailand	Buriram, Thailand
	Wei Lei 90+1'	Report	T. Yeewangkong 6', 20'; M. Mueller 25'; T. Schimtt 44'	Stadium: Buriram Stadium; Referee: Ashwin Kumar India)

14 November 2026 2027 AFC U-17 Asian Cup Q	Thailand	7–0	Maldives	Buriram, Thailand
	Yeewangkong 7'; Sawkhom 17'; Buacharoen 24'; Wuttichai 26' (pen.); Hwaaied 46', 49', 77'	Report		Stadium: Buriram Stadium; Referee: Abdulaziz Mousa Abdulla (Qatar)

17 November 2026 2027 AFC U-17 Asian Cup Q	Hong Kong	1–2	Thailand	Buriram, Thailand
	Yu Ching Kok 85'		Müller 27'; Siriwat 84'	Stadium: Buriram Stadium

20 November 2026 2027 AFC U-17 Asian Cup Q	Thailand	v	Iraq	Buriram, Thailand
				Stadium: Buriram Stadium

=== Previous squads ===
FIFA U-17 World Cup

- 1997 FIFA U-17 World Championship squads
- 1999 FIFA U-17 World Championship squads

AFC U-16 Championship

- 2014 AFC U-16 Championship squads
- 2016 AFC U-16 Championship squads
- 2018 AFC U-16 Championship squads

== Coaching staff ==
Position	Name
Head coach	(Thailand) Wasapol Kaewpaluk
Assistant coach	(Thailand) Mika Chunuonsee (Thailand) Nat Wejchabul (Thailand) Suchao Nuchnum
Goalkeeper coach	(Thailand) Worawut Thipsakwarakul
Fitness coach	(Thailand) Kritsana Kamutasen
Analyst	(Thailand) Pann Winitchakool
Doctor	(Thailand) Keerati Surakarn
Physiotherapists	(Thailand) Jirajet Jiranan

== Head coaches ==
Thailand national under-17 football team head coaches
Name	Country	Period	Honours
Charnwit Polcheewin	Thailand	1996–1997	1996 AFC U-17 Championship – Runner-up; 1997 FIFA U-17 World Championship – Group stage
Somchart Yimsiri	Thailand	1998–1999	1998 AFC U-17 Championship – Winners; 1999 FIFA U-17 World Championship – Group stage
Witthaya Laohakul	Thailand	2000–2002	2000 AFC U-17 Championship – Group stage
Sasom Pobprasert	Thailand	2004	2004 AFC U-17 Championship – Group stage
Thanis Areesngarkul	Thailand	2005–2006	2005 AFF U-17 Youth Championship – Runner-up
Phayong Khunnaen	Thailand	2007–2008	2007 AFF U-17 Youth Championship – Winners
Carlos Roberto	Brazil	2009	
Sasom Pobprasert	Thailand	2011	2011 AFF U-16 Youth Championship – Winners
Leones Pereira dos Santos	Brazil	2012	2012 AFC U-16 Championship – Group stage
Adul Rungrueang	Thailand	2014	2014 AFC U-16 Championship – Group stage
Phayong Khunnaen	Thailand	2015	2015 AFF U-16 Youth Championship – Winners
Chaiyong Khumpiam	Thailand	2016	2016 AFF U-16 Youth Championship – Third place 2016 AFC U-16 Championship – Group stage
Sarawut Suksawang (interim)	Thailand	2017	2017 Jockey Club International Youth Tournament – Winners
Salvador Valero Garcia	Spain	2017–2018	2017 AFF U-15 Championship – Runner-up
Thongchai Rungreangles	Thailand	2018	2018 AFF U-16 Youth Championship – Runner-up; 2018 AFC U-16 Championship – Group stage
Salvador Valero Garcia	Spain	2019–2021	2019 AFF U-15 Youth Championship – Runner-up
Pipob On-Mo	Thailand	2021–2023	2022 AFF U-16 Youth Championship – Third place 2023 AFC U-17 Asian Cup – Quarter-Finals
Chayakorn Tanaddernkao (Interim)	Thailand	2024	
Jadet Meelarp	Thailand	2024–2025	2024 ASEAN U-16 Boys Championship – Runner-up; 2025 AFC U-17 Asian Cup – Group stage
Songyot Klinsrisuk (Interim)	Thailand	2025	
Marco Göckel	Germany	2025–2026	2026 AFC U-17 Asian Cup – Group stage
Sirisak Yodyardthai	Thailand	2026	2026 ASEAN U-17 Boys' Championship – Group stage
Wasapol Kaewpaluk	Thailand	2026–	

== Competition record ==
=== FIFA U-17 World Cup ===
FIFA U-17 World Cup finals record
Year	Host country	Result	Position	GP	W	D*	L	GS	GA
1985	China	Did not qualify							
1987	Canada	Did not qualify							
1989	Scotland	Did not qualify							
1991	Italy	Did not qualify							
1993	Japan	Did not qualify							
1995	Ecuador	Did not qualify							
1997	Egypt	First round	14th	3	0	0	3	4	12
1999	New Zealand	First round	16th	3	0	0	3	1	17
2001	Trinidad and Tobago	Did not qualify							
2003	Finland	Did not enter							
2005	Peru	Did not qualify							
2007	South Korea	Did not qualify							
2009	Nigeria	Did not qualify							
2011	Mexico	Did not qualify							
2013	United Arab Emirates	Did not qualify							
2015	Chile	Did not qualify							
2017	India	Did not qualify							
2019	Brazil	Did not qualify							
~~2021~~	Peru	Did not qualify and cancelled							
2023	Indonesia	Did not qualify							
2025	Qatar	Did not qualify							
2026	Qatar	Did not qualify							
2027	Qatar	Did not qualify							
Total		2/20	14th	6	0	0	6	5	29

Note

- * : Denotes draws including knockout matches decided on penalty kicks.

=== AFC U-17 Asian Cup ===
AFC U-17 Championship finals record										Qualifications record					
Year	Host country	Result	Position	GP	W	D*	L	GS	GA	GP	W	D	L	GS	GA
1985	Qatar	Fourth place	4th	5	1	2	2	3	4	4	4	0	0	19	0
1986	Qatar	Did not qualify								N/A					
1988	Thailand	Group stage	7th	4	1	1	2	4	5	Qualified as host					
1990	United Arab Emirates	Did not qualify								N/A					
1992^{1}	Saudi Arabia	Group stage	6th	3	1	0	2	3	5	3	3	0	0	21	0
1994^{1}	Qatar	Did not qualify								N/A					
1996^{1}	Thailand	Runner-up	2nd	6	4	1	1	16	4	Qualified as host					
1998^{1}	Qatar	Champions	1st	6	3	2	1	13	7	3	3	0	0	25	0
2000^{1}	Vietnam	Group stage	8th	4	1	0	3	4	9	3	3	0	0	13	0
2002	United Arab Emirates	Did not enter								Did not enter					
2004^{1}	Japan	Group stage	11th	3	1	0	2	4	7	2	2	0	0	7	1
2006^{1}	Singapore	Did not qualify								3	1	1	1	11	2
2008	Uzbekistan	Did not qualify								4	2	0	2	15	7
2010	Uzbekistan	Did not qualify								5	2	2	1	13	4
2012	Iran	Group stage	16th	3	0	0	3	2	7	5	5	0	0	28	6
2014	Thailand	Group stage	10th	3	1	0	2	1	3	Qualified as host					
2016	India	Group stage	14th	3	0	1	2	5	10	3	2	0	1	6	2
2018	Malaysia	Group stage	11th	3	1	0	2	7	9	4	3	0	1	18	2
~~2020~~	Bahrain	Did not qualify and cancelled								3	2	0	1	10	2
2023	Thailand	Quarter-Finals	6th	4	3	0	1	7	5	3	2	0	1	6	4
2025	Saudi Arabia	Group stage	15th	3	0	0	3	2	9	3	3	0	0	24	2
2026	Saudi Arabia	Group stage	11	3	0	1	2	2	5	4	3	0	1	16	4
2027	Uzbekistan	Did not qualify								4	3	0	1	14	4
Total:13/19		1 Title	Best: 1st	53	17	8	28	73	89	56	43	3	10	246	40

Note

- ^{1} : The under-17 national team played at the 1992 to 2006 editions.
- * : Denotes draws including knockout matches decided on penalty kicks.

AFC U-17 Championship achievable editions
Year	Round	Score	Result
(Thailand) 1996	Group stage	Thailand 7–0 India	Win
(Thailand) 1996	Group stage	Thailand 3–0 Iran	Win
(Thailand) 1996	Group stage	Thailand 1–1 China	Draw
(Thailand) 1996	Group stage	Thailand 4–2 Bahrain	Win
(Thailand) 1996	Semifinals	Thailand 1–0 Japan	Win
(Thailand) 1996	Final	Thailand 0–1 Oman	Loss
(Thailand) 1996	Qualified for 1997 FIFA U-17 World Championship		
(Qatar) 1998	Group stage	Thailand 2–1 Iran	Win
(Qatar) 1998	Group stage	Thailand 3–2 Iraq	Win
(Qatar) 1998	Group stage	Thailand 0–2 North Korea	Loss
(Qatar) 1998	Group stage	Thailand 2–2 Bangladesh	Draw
(Qatar) 1998	Semifinals	Thailand 6–0 Bahrain	Win
(Qatar) 1998	Final	Thailand ^{1}1 - 1 Qatar	Win
(Qatar) 1998	Qualified for 1999 FIFA U-17 World Championship		

Note

- ^{1} : Thailand won by pk (3-2) after playing an extra time.

AFC U-17 Championship history
First Match	Thailand 2–2 South Yemen (2 February 1985; Doha, Qatar)
Biggest Win	Thailand 7–0 India (17 September 1996; Bangkok, Thailand)
Biggest Defeat	Iran 3–0 Thailand (6 September 2000, Da Nang, Vietnam); North Korea 4–1 Thailand (8 September 2004, Japan); Thailand 1–4 North Korea (20 September 2016, Bambolim, India); Thailand 1–4 South Korea (25 June 2023, Pathum Thani, Thailand)
Best Result	Champions in 1998
Worst Result	Group stage at 7 editions

=== AFF U-17 Championship ===
AFF U-16 Championship record
Year	Host country	Result	Position	GP	W	D*	L	GS	GA
2002^{1}	Indonesia; Malaysia	Group stage	5th	4	1	2	1	13	6
2005^{1}	Thailand	Runner-up	2nd	4	3	0	1	12	9
2006^{1}	Vietnam	Did not enter							
2007^{1}	Cambodia	Champions	1st	6	5	0	1	15	7
2008	Indonesia	Did not enter							
2009	Thailand	Cancelled							
2010	Indonesia	Did not enter							
2011	Laos	Champions	1st	6	4	2	0	14	4
2012	Laos	Fourth place	4th	4	0	0	4	2	11
2013	Myanmar	Did not enter							
2014	Indonesia	Cancelled							
2015	Cambodia	Champions	1st	7	6	0	1	16	4
2016	Cambodia	Third place	3rd	6	5	1	0	18	3
2017	Thailand	Runner-up	2nd	7	6	1	0	9	2
2018	Indonesia	Runner-up	2nd	6	4	2	0	14	3
2019	Thailand	Runner-up	2nd	7	4	2	1	18	6
2022	Indonesia	Third place	3rd	5	3	1	1	13	4
2024	Indonesia	Runner-up	2nd	5	3	2	0	12	3
2026	Indonesia	Group stage	9th	3	1	0	2	7	5
Total		13/17	Best: 1st	70	45	13	12	163	67

Note

- ^{1} : The under-17 national team played at the 2005 to 2007 editions.
- * : Denotes draws including knockout matches decided on penalty kicks.

=== Exhibition game ===
Exhibition game record
Year	Tournament	Result	Position	GP	W	D*	L	GS	GA
1980	(Singapore) Lion City Cup	4th place	4th	6	3	2	1	19	6
1981	(Singapore) Lion City Cup	Semi-final	4th	5	3	0	2	9	4
1982	(Singapore) Lion City Cup	Champions	1st	5	5	0	0	14	1
1984	(Thailand) Coca-Cola Cups	Champions	1st	4	4	0	0	10	1
1986	(China) Coca-Cola Cups	3rd place	3rd	5	3	1	1	N/A	
1988	(Indonesia) Coca-Cola Cups	Runner-up	2nd	5	4	0	1	15	5
1992	(Thailand) Coca-Cola Cups	4th place	4th	N/A					
2008	(Singapore) Lion City Cup	Champions	1st	4	4	0	0	N/A	
Total				20	15	2	3	42	11

Note

- * : Denotes draws including knockout matches decided on penalty kicks.

== Honours ==
This is a list of honours for the Thailand national under-17 football team.

=== International titles ===
- AFC U-16 Championship
  - Winners (1): 1998
  - Runner-up (1): 1996

=== Regional titles ===
- AFF U-16 Championship
  - Winners (3): 2007, 2011, 2015
  - Runner-up (5): 2005, 2017, 2018, 2019, 2024
  - Third place (2): 2016, 2022

=== Minor titles ===
- Singapore Lion City Cup Championship
  - Winners (2): 1982, 2008
- Coca-Cola U-16 Cups
  - Winners (1): 1984
- Jockey Club International Youth Tournament
  - Winners (1): 2017
- CFA Under-17 Mens International Football Tournament
  - Winners (1): 2018

== Head-to-head record ==
The following table shows Thailand's head-to-head record in the FIFA U-17 World Cup and AFC U-17 Asian Cup.

=== In FIFA U-17 World Cup ===
Opponent	Pld	W	D	L	GF	GA	GD	Win %
Chile	1	0	0	1	2	6	−4	0.00
Egypt	1	0	0	1	2	3	−1	0.00
Germany	1	0	0	1	0	3	−3	0.00
Ghana	1	0	0	1	1	7	−6	0.00
Mexico	1	0	0	1	0	4	−4	0.00
Spain	1	0	0	1	0	6	−6	0.00
Total	6	0	0	6	5	29	−24	0.00

=== In AFC U-17 Asian Cup ===
Opponent	Pld	W	D	L	GF	GA	GD	Win %
Australia	1	0	0	1	0	2	−2	0.00
Bahrain	3	2	1	0	10	2	+8	66.67
Bangladesh	1	0	0	1	0	2	−2	0.00
China	4	0	2	2	2	4	−2	0.00
India	1	1	0	0	7	0	+7	100.00
Indonesia	1	1	0	0	2	0	+2	100.00
Iran	3	2	0	1	5	4	+1	66.67
Iraq	4	2	0	2	4	5	−1	50.00
Japan	3	2	0	1	5	6	−1	66.67
Kuwait	1	1	0	0	3	2	+1	100.00
Laos	1	1	0	0	2	1	+1	100.00
Malaysia	3	2	0	1	7	3	+4	66.67
North Korea	3	0	0	3	2	10	−8	0.00
Oman	4	1	0	3	4	6	−2	25.00
Qatar	3	0	2	1	3	5	−2	0.00
Saudi Arabia	2	0	0	2	1	4	−3	0.00
South Korea	3	0	0	3	2	8	−6	0.00
South Yemen	1	0	1	0	2	2	+0	0.00
Tajikistan	1	0	0	1	1	2	−1	0.00
United Arab Emirates	1	1	0	0	2	1	+1	100.00
Uzbekistan	1	0	0	1	3	5	−2	0.00
Yemen	2	1	1	0	2	1	+1	50.00
Total	47	17	7	23	69	75	−6	36.17

== See also ==
- Thailand national football team
- Thailand national under-23 football team
- Thailand national under-21 football team
- Thailand national under-20 football team
- Thailand national under-15 football team
