= 2018 AFC U-16 Championship =

Kejohanan Remaja B-16 AFC 2018

Tournament details
- Host country: Malaysia
- Dates: 20 September – 7 October
- Teams: 16 (from 1 confederation)
- Venue: 3 (in 2 host cities)

Final positions
- Champions: Japan (3rd title)
- Runners-up: Tajikistan

Tournament statistics
- Matches played: 31
- Goals scored: 97 (3.13 per match)
- Attendance: 62,582 (2,019 per match)
- Top scorer(s): (Australia) Noah Botic (Japan) Shoji Toyama (Malaysia) Luqman Hakim (5 goals each)
- Best player: (Japan) Jun Nishikawa
- Fair play award: Japan

The 2018 AFC U-16 Championship was the 18th edition of the AFC U-16 Championship, the biennial international youth football championship organised by the Asian Football Confederation (AFC) for the men's under-16 national teams of Asia. It took place in Malaysia, which was appointed as hosts by the AFC on 25 July 2017, between 20 September and 7 October 2018. A total of 16 teams played in the tournament.

The top four teams of the tournament qualified for the 2019 FIFA U-17 World Cup in Brazil as the AFC representatives. Japan won their third title, and qualified together with runners-up Tajikistan and semi-finalists Australia and South Korea. Iraq were the defending champions but were eliminated in the group stage.

== Qualification ==
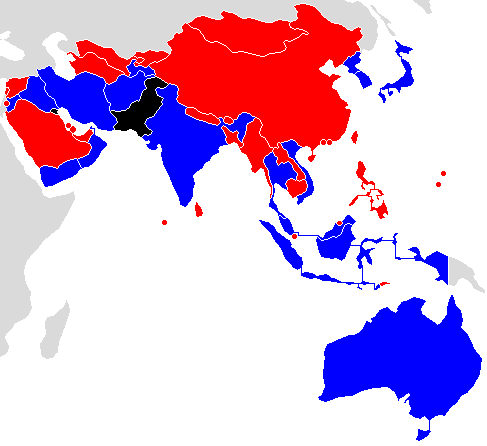

Qualifying was played on 16–29 September 2017. Malaysia also participated in the qualifiers, even though they had already qualified automatically as hosts.

=== Qualified teams ===
The following 16 teams qualified for the final tournament.

| Team | Qualified as | Appearance | Previous best performance |
|---|---|---|---|
| Malaysia | Hosts | 5th | Quarter-finals (2014) |
| Jordan | Group A winners | 3rd | Quarter-finals (2010) |
| Tajikistan | Group B winners | 3rd | Third place (2006) |
| Iran | Group C winners | 11th | Champions (2008) |
| Iraq | Group D winners | 10th | Champions (2016) |
| Yemen | Group E winners | 6th | Runners-up (2002) |
| North Korea | Group F winners | 11th | Champions (2010, 2014) |
| Indonesia | Group G winners | 6th | Fourth place (1990) |
| South Korea | Group H winners | 14th | Champions (1986, 2002) |
| Australia | Group I winners | 6th | Semi-finals (2010, 2014) |
| Japan | Group J winners | 15th | Champions (1994, 2006) |
| India | Group D runners-up (Note: As Malaysia (Group J runners-up) had already automatically qualified for the final tournament as hosts, the five best runners-up (excluding Malaysia) qualified for the final tournament.) | 8th | Quarter-finals (2002) |
| Oman | Group B runners-up | 10th | Champions (1996, 2000) |
| Thailand | Group G runners-up | 11th | Champions (1998) |
| Vietnam | Group I runners-up | 7th | Fourth place (2000) |
| Afghanistan | Group C runners-up | 1st | Debut |

== Venues ==
The matches were played in three venues around Klang Valley. The venues were Bukit Jalil National Stadium, UM Arena Stadium and Petaling Jaya Stadium. The final match was held at Bukit Jalil National Stadium.

| Kuala Lumpur | | 2018 AFC U-16 Championship is located in Selangor | Petaling Jaya |
|---|---|---|---|
| Bukit Jalil National Stadium | UM Arena Stadium | 2018 AFC U-16 Championship is located in Selangor | Petaling Jaya Stadium |
| Capacity: 87,411 | Capacity: 1,000 | 2018 AFC U-16 Championship is located in Selangor | Capacity: 25,000 |

== Draw ==
The draw of the final tournament was held on 26 April 2018, 15:00 MYT (UTC+8), at the AFC House in Kuala Lumpur. The 16 teams were drawn into four groups of four teams. The teams were seeded according to their performance in the 2016 AFC U-16 Championship final tournament and qualification, with the hosts Malaysia automatically seeded and assigned to Position A1 in the draw.

| Pot 1 | Pot 2 | Pot 3 | Pot 4 |
|---|---|---|---|
| 1. Malaysia (hosts); 2. Iraq; 3. Iran; 4. North Korea | 5. Japan; 6. Oman; 7. Vietnam; 8. South Korea | 9. Yemen; 10. India; 11. Thailand; 12. Australia | 13. Tajikistan; 14. Jordan; 15. Afghanistan; 16. Indonesia |

== Squads ==
Players born on or after 1 January 2002 were eligible to compete in the tournament. Each team should register a squad of minimum 18 players and maximum 23 players, minimum three of whom must be goalkeepers.

== Group stage ==
The top two teams of each group advanced to the quarter-finals.

Tiebreakers

Teams were ranked according to points (3 points for a win, 1 point for a draw, 0 points for a loss), and if tied on points, the following tiebreaking criteria were applied, in the order given, to determine the rankings:

1. Points in head-to-head matches among tied teams;
2. Goal difference in head-to-head matches among tied teams;
3. Goals scored in head-to-head matches among tied teams;
4. If more than two teams are tied, and after applying all head-to-head criteria above, a subset of teams are still tied, all head-to-head criteria above are reapplied exclusively to this subset of teams;
5. Goal difference in all group matches;
6. Goals scored in all group matches;
7. Penalty shoot-out if only two teams are tied and they met in the last round of the group;
8. Disciplinary points (yellow card = 1 point, red card as a result of two yellow cards = 3 points, direct red card = 3 points, yellow card followed by direct red card = 4 points);
9. Drawing of lots.

All times are local, MYT (UTC+8).

Schedule
| Matchday | Dates | Matches |
|---|---|---|
| Matchday 1 | 20–22 September 2018 | 1 v 4, 2 v 3 |
| Matchday 2 | 23–25 September 2018 | 4 v 2, 3 v 1 |
| Matchday 3 | 27–28 September 2018 (Note: Due to weather conditions (heavy rainfall and lightning), both Matchday 3 matches in Group A were postponed from 26 September, 16:30 (and initially pushed to 17:30) to 27 September, 11:00.) | 1 v 2, 3 v 4 |

=== Group A ===
| Pos | Team | Pld | W | D | L | GF | GA | GD | Pts | Qualification |
|---|---|---|---|---|---|---|---|---|---|---|
| 1 | Japan | 3 | 2 | 1 | 0 | 7 | 2 | +5 | 7 | Knockout stage |
| 2 | Tajikistan | 3 | 1 | 1 | 1 | 4 | 7 | −3 | 4 | Knockout stage |
| 3 | Thailand | 3 | 1 | 0 | 2 | 7 | 9 | −2 | 3 (Note: Head-to-head result: Thailand 4–2 Malaysia.) | |
| 4 | Malaysia (H) | 3 | 1 | 0 | 2 | 8 | 8 | 0 | 3 | |

Source: AFC
Rules for classification: Group stage tiebreakers
(H) Hosts
Notes:
20 September 2018
16:30

| Malaysia | 6–2 | Tajikistan |
|---|---|---|
| Luqman 30', 42', 46', 66'; Najmudin 33' (pen.); Mutalib 76' (pen.) | Report | Rahmatov 72' (pen.); Zairov 90+1' |

Bukit Jalil National Stadium, Kuala Lumpur
Attendance: 723
Referee: Ahmad Yacoub Ibrahim (Jordan)
20 September 2018
20:45

| Japan | 5–2 | Thailand |
|---|---|---|
| Araki 6', 34'; Kondo 8'; Handa 42'; Toyama 90+1' | Report | Warakorn 1'; Suphanat 15' |

UM Arena Stadium, Kuala Lumpur
Attendance: 86
Referee: Payam Heidari (Iran)

23 September 2018
16:30

| Thailand | 4–2 | Malaysia |
|---|---|---|
| Suphanat 3', 21'; Warakorn 57'; Apidet 85' | Report | Luqman 12'; Firdaus 48' |

Bukit Jalil National Stadium, Kuala Lumpur
Attendance: 8,596
Referee: Omar Mohamed Al-Ali (United Arab Emirates)
23 September 2018
20:45

| Tajikistan | 0–0 | Japan |
|---|---|---|
| | Report |

UM Arena Stadium, Kuala Lumpur
Attendance: 115
Referee: Saoud Al-Athbah (Qatar)

27 September 2018
11:00

| Malaysia | 0–2 | Japan |
|---|---|---|
| | Report | Toyama 37'; Naruoka 90+3' |

Bukit Jalil National Stadium, Kuala Lumpur
Attendance: 8,378
Referee: Kim Woo-sung (South Korea)
27 September 2018
11:00

| Thailand | 1–2 | Tajikistan |
|---|---|---|
| Suphanat 80' | Report | Panzhiev 38'; Zairov 84' |

UM Arena Stadium, Kuala Lumpur
Attendance: 75
Referee: Shukri Al-Hunfush (Saudi Arabia)

=== Group B ===
| Pos | Team | Pld | W | D | L | GF | GA | GD | Pts | Qualification |
|---|---|---|---|---|---|---|---|---|---|---|
| 1 | North Korea | 3 | 2 | 1 | 0 | 6 | 3 | +3 | 7 | Knockout stage |
| 2 | Oman | 3 | 1 | 1 | 1 | 5 | 5 | 0 | 4 | Knockout stage |
| 3 | Yemen | 3 | 1 | 0 | 2 | 5 | 4 | +1 | 3 | |
| 4 | Jordan | 3 | 0 | 2 | 1 | 5 | 9 | −4 | 2 | |

Source: AFC
Rules for classification: Group stage tiebreakers
21 September 2018
16:30

| Oman | 2–0 | Yemen |
|---|---|---|
| Al-Jaradi 14', 35' | Report |

Petaling Jaya Stadium, Petaling Jaya
Attendance: 750
Referee: Nazmi Nasaruddin (Malaysia)
21 September 2018
20:45

| North Korea | 2–2 | Jordan |
|---|---|---|
| Kim Kang-song 20', 44' | Report | Semreen 31'; Jamous 75' |

Petaling Jaya Stadium, Petaling Jaya
Attendance: 200
Referee: Pranjal Banerjee (India)

24 September 2018
16:30

| Jordan | 2–2 | Oman |
|---|---|---|
| Bani Hani 49'; Jamous 75' (pen.) | Report | Al-Salti 54'; N. Al-Naabi 86' |

Petaling Jaya Stadium, Petaling Jaya
Attendance: 50
Referee: Ammar Mahfoodh (Bahrain)
24 September 2018
20:45

| Yemen | 0–1 | North Korea |
|---|---|---|
| | Report | Kim Won-il 45+2' |

Petaling Jaya Stadium, Petaling Jaya
Attendance: 815
Referee: Yusuke Araki (Japan)

27 September 2018
16:30

| North Korea | 3–1 | Oman |
|---|---|---|
| Pak Ryong-gwon 4'; Kim Kang-song 16'; An Phyong-il 45+1' | Report | Al-Jaradi 78' (pen.) |

Petaling Jaya Stadium, Petaling Jaya
Attendance: 100
Referee: Nazmi Nasaruddin (Malaysia)
27 September 2018
16:30

| Yemen | 5–1 | Jordan |
|---|---|---|
| Saif 14', 73' (pen.); Senan 16'; Al-Qaaod 24'; Issa 25' (o.g.) | Report | Bani Hani 75' (pen.) |

Bukit Jalil National Stadium, Kuala Lumpur
Attendance: 531
Referee: Omar Mohamed Al-Ali (United Arab Emirates)

=== Group C ===
| Pos | Team | Pld | W | D | L | GF | GA | GD | Pts | Qualification |
|---|---|---|---|---|---|---|---|---|---|---|
| 1 | Indonesia | 3 | 1 | 2 | 0 | 3 | 1 | +2 | 5 | Knockout stage |
| 2 | India | 3 | 1 | 2 | 0 | 1 | 0 | +1 | 5 | Knockout stage |
| 3 | Iran | 3 | 1 | 1 | 1 | 5 | 2 | +3 | 4 | |
| 4 | Vietnam | 3 | 0 | 1 | 2 | 1 | 7 | −6 | 1 | |

Source: AFC
Rules for classification: Group stage tiebreakers
21 September 2018
16:30

| Iran | 0–2 | Indonesia |
|---|---|---|
| | Report | Bagus 4'; Bagas 90+1' |

Bukit Jalil National Stadium, Kuala Lumpur
Attendance: 3,431
Referee: Kim Woo-sung (South Korea)
21 September 2018
20:45

| Vietnam | 0–1 | India |
|---|---|---|
| | Report | V. Singh 86' (pen.) |

UM Arena Stadium, Kuala Lumpur
Attendance: 166
Referee: Yusuke Araki (Japan)

24 September 2018
16:30

| India | 0–0 | Iran |
|---|---|---|
| | Report |

Bukit Jalil National Stadium, Kuala Lumpur
Attendance: 186
Referee: Nazmi Nasaruddin (Malaysia)
24 September 2018
20:45

| Indonesia | 1–1 | Vietnam |
|---|---|---|
| Zico 49' | Report | Khuất Văn Khang 30' |

Bukit Jalil National Stadium, Kuala Lumpur
Attendance: 11,201
Referee: Ahmad Yacoub Ibrahim (Jordan)

27 September 2018
20:45

| Iran | 5–0 | Vietnam |
|---|---|---|
| Azizi 18', 36'; Barzegar 21'; Doustali 31', 64' | Report |

UM Arena Stadium, Kuala Lumpur (Note: The following venue changes were announced by the AFC on 25 September 2018 due to a request by the football associations of Malaysia and Indonesia in order to accommodate the large number of Indonesian fans: The Group C match between Iran v Vietnam was switched from Bukit Jalil National Stadium to UM Arena Stadium.; The Group C match between India v Indonesia was switched from UM Arena Stadium to Bukit Jalil National Stadium.; The quarter-final match between Group C winners v Group D runners-up was switched from UM Arena Stadium to Bukit Jalil National Stadium.)
Attendance: 105
Referee: Saoud Al-Athbah (Qatar)
27 September 2018
20:45

| India | 0–0 | Indonesia |
|---|---|---|
| | Report |

Bukit Jalil National Stadium, Kuala Lumpur
Attendance: 11,388
Referee: Ahmad Yacoub Ibrahim (Jordan)

=== Group D ===
| Pos | Team | Pld | W | D | L | GF | GA | GD | Pts | Qualification |
|---|---|---|---|---|---|---|---|---|---|---|
| 1 | South Korea | 3 | 3 | 0 | 0 | 12 | 0 | +12 | 9 | Knockout stage |
| 2 | Australia | 3 | 2 | 0 | 1 | 6 | 4 | +2 | 6 | Knockout stage |
| 3 | Iraq | 3 | 1 | 0 | 2 | 3 | 5 | −2 | 3 | |
| 4 | Afghanistan | 3 | 0 | 0 | 3 | 1 | 13 | −12 | 0 | |

Source: AFC
Rules for classification: Group stage tiebreakers
22 September 2018
16:30

| Iraq | 2–1 | Afghanistan |
|---|---|---|
| Sadeq 3'; Qasim 14' (pen.) | Report | Zahidi 5' |

UM Arena Stadium, Kuala Lumpur
Attendance: 10
Referee: Chen Hsin-chuan (Chinese Taipei)
22 September 2018
20:45

| South Korea | 3–0 | Australia |
|---|---|---|
| Choi Min-seo 43', 68'; Hong Yun-sang 51' | Report |

Petaling Jaya Stadium, Petaling Jaya
Attendance: 133
Referee: Shukri Al-Hunfush (Saudi Arabia)

25 September 2018
16:30

| Australia | 2–1 | Iraq |
|---|---|---|
| Duzel 67'; Botic 74' | Report | Qasim 81' (pen.) |

UM Arena Stadium, Kuala Lumpur
Attendance: 187
Referee: Payam Heidari (Iran)
25 September 2018
20:45

| Afghanistan | 0–7 | South Korea |
|---|---|---|
| | Report | Ahn Gi-hun 22', 35'; Kazimi 45' (o.g.); Paik Sang-hoon 46'; Jeong Sang-bin 59', 63'; Hong Yun-sang 67' |

Petaling Jaya Stadium, Petaling Jaya
Attendance: 150
Referee: Pranjal Banerjee (India)

28 September 2018
16:30

| Iraq | 0–2 | South Korea |
|---|---|---|
| | Report | Moon Jun-ho 45', 48' |

UM Arena Stadium, Kuala Lumpur
Attendance: 120
Referee: Yusuke Araki (Japan)
28 September 2018
16:30

| Australia | 4–0 | Afghanistan |
|---|---|---|
| Roddy 8', 45+3'; Botic 26', 61' | Report |

Petaling Jaya Stadium, Petaling Jaya
Attendance: 115
Referee: Chen Hsin-chuan (Chinese Taipei)

== Knockout stage ==
In the knockout stage, penalty shoot-out without extra time was used to decide the winners if necessary.

=== Bracket ===
Quarter-finals
30 September – Bukit Jalil
Japan | 2
Oman | 1
1 October – Bukit Jalil
Indonesia | 2
Australia | 3
30 September – Petaling Jaya
North Korea | 1 (2)
Tajikistan (p) | 1 (4)
1 October – Petaling Jaya
South Korea | 1
India | 0

Semi-finals
4 October – Bukit Jalil
Japan | 3
Australia | 1
4 October – Petaling Jaya
Tajikistan (p) | 1 (7)
South Korea | 1 (6)

Final
7 October – Bukit Jalil
Japan | 1
Tajikistan | 0

=== Quarter-finals ===
The winners qualified for the 2019 FIFA U-17 World Cup.

30 September 2018
16:30

| Japan | 2–1 | Oman |
|---|---|---|
| I. Al-Naabi 14' (o.g.); Toyama 81' | Report | Al-Mashary 22' |

Bukit Jalil National Stadium, Kuala Lumpur
Attendance: 267
Referee: Payam Heidari (Iran)

30 September 2018
20:45

| North Korea | 1–1 | Tajikistan |
|---|---|---|
| Ri Hun 69' | Report | Soirov 14' |
Penalties
| Ra Nam-hyon (penalty scored); Kim Jin-guk (penalty missed); Chae Yu-song (penalty missed); Kim Jin-hyok (penalty scored) | 2–4 | (penalty scored) Rahmatov; (penalty scored) Panzhiev; (penalty scored) Sharipov; (penalty scored) Soirov |

Petaling Jaya Stadium, Petaling Jaya
Attendance: 100
Referee: Ammar Mahfoodh (Bahrain)

1 October 2018
16:30

| Indonesia | 2–3 | Australia |
|---|---|---|
| Zico 17'; Rendy 89' | Report | Walsh 51'; Leombruno 65'; Botic 74' |

Bukit Jalil National Stadium, Kuala Lumpur
Attendance: 13,743
Referee: Kim Woo-sung (South Korea)

1 October 2018
20:45

| South Korea | 1–0 | India |
|---|---|---|
| Jeong Sang-bin 68' | Report |

Petaling Jaya Stadium, Petaling Jaya
Attendance: 200
Referee: Yusuke Araki (Japan)

=== Semi-finals ===
4 October 2018
16:30

| Japan | 3–1 | Australia |
|---|---|---|
| Toyama 59', 69'; Mito 78' | Report | Botic 8' (pen.) |

Bukit Jalil National Stadium, Kuala Lumpur
Attendance: 224
Referee: Omar Mohamed Al-Ali (United Arab Emirates)

4 October 2018
20:45

| Tajikistan | 1–1 | South Korea |
|---|---|---|
| Panzhiev 2' | Report | Yoon Suk-ju 39' |
Penalties
| Rahmatov (penalty scored); Sharipov (penalty scored); Zakirov (penalty scored); Panzhiev (penalty scored); Soirov (penalty scored); Sangov (penalty scored); Litfullaev (penalty scored) | 7–6 | (penalty scored) Jeong Sang-bin; (penalty scored) Lee Tae-seok; (penalty scored) Lee Jun-suk; (penalty scored) Hong Sung-wook; (penalty scored) Moon Jun-ho; (penalty scored) Yoon Suk-ju; (penalty missed) Son Ho-jun |

Petaling Jaya Stadium, Petaling Jaya
Attendance: 85
Referee: Nazmi Nasaruddin (Malaysia)

=== Final ===
7 October 2018
20:45

| Japan | 1–0 | Tajikistan |
|---|---|---|
| Nishikawa 63' | Report |

Bukit Jalil National Stadium, Kuala Lumpur
Attendance: 352
Referee: Ahmad Yacoub Ibrahim (Jordan)

== Winners ==
2018 AFC U-16 Championship

Japan
Third title

== Awards ==
The following awards were given at the conclusion of the tournament:

| Top Goalscorer | Most Valuable Player | Fair Play award |
|---|---|---|
| (Malaysia) Luqman Hakim (Note: Playing less than the other players scoring 5 goals (with 2 matches), Luqman won the Top Scorer Award) | (Japan) Jun Nishikawa | Japan |

== Goalscorers ==
There were 97 goals scored in 31 matches, for an average of 3.13 goals per match.

5 goals

- (Australia) Noah Botic
- (Japan) Shoji Toyama
- (Malaysia) Luqman Hakim

4 goals

- (Thailand) Suphanat Mueanta

3 goals

- (North Korea) Kim Kang-song
- (Oman) Qusai Al-Jaradi
- (South Korea) Jeong Sang-bin

2 goals

- (Australia) Joseph Roddy
- (Indonesia) Sutan Zico
- (Iran) Amirhossein Azizi
- (Iran) Amin Doustali
- (Iraq) Abdulrazzaq Qasim
- (Japan) Ryotaro Araki
- (Jordan) Reziq Bani Hani
- (Jordan) Amer Jamous
- (South Korea) Ahn Gi-hun
- (South Korea) Choi Min-seo
- (South Korea) Hong Yun-sang
- (South Korea) Moon Jun-ho
- (Tajikistan) Ozodbek Panzhiev
- (Tajikistan) Islom Zairov
- (Thailand) Warakorn Thongbai
- (Yemen) Faisal Saif

1 goal

- (Afghanistan) Ali Zahidi
- (Australia) Luke Duzel
- (Australia) Adam Leombruno
- (Australia) Daniel Walsh
- (India) Vikram Pratap Singh
- (Indonesia) Bagas Kaffa
- (Indonesia) Bagus Kahfi
- (Indonesia) Rendy Juliansyah
- (Iran) Aria Barzegar
- (Iraq) Hussein Sadeq
- (Japan) Riku Handa
- (Japan) Kuraba Kondo
- (Japan) Shunsuke Mito
- (Japan) Hikaru Naruoka
- (Japan) Jun Nishikawa
- (Jordan) Mohannad Semreen
- (Malaysia) Alif Mutalib
- (Malaysia) Firdaus Kaironnisam
- (Malaysia) Najmudin Akmal
- (North Korea) An Phyong-il
- (North Korea) Kim Won-il
- (North Korea) Pak Ryong-gwon
- (North Korea) Ri Hun
- (Oman) Tariq Al-Mashary
- (Oman) Nasser Al-Naabi
- (Oman) Omar Al-Salti
- (South Korea) Paik Sang-hoon
- (South Korea) Yoon Suk-ju
- (Tajikistan) Rustam Soirov
- (Tajikistan) Sharifbek Rahmatov
- (Thailand) Apidet Janngam
- (Vietnam) Khuất Văn Khang
- (Yemen) Saad Al-Qaaod
- (Yemen) Tamer Senan

1 own goal

- (Afghanistan) Esmatullah Kazimi (against South Korea)
- (Jordan) Mohammad Issa (against Yemen)
- (Oman) Issa Al-Naabi (against Japan)

== Qualified teams for FIFA U-17 World Cup ==
The following four teams from AFC qualified for the 2019 FIFA U-17 World Cup.

| Team | Qualified on | Previous appearances in FIFA U-17 World Cup ^{1} |
|---|---|---|
| Japan | 30 September 2018 | 8 (1993, 1995, 2001, 2007, 2009, 2011, 2013, 2017) |
| Tajikistan | 30 September 2018 | 1 (2007) |
| Australia | 1 October 2018 | 12 ^{2} (1985, 1987, 1989, 1991, 1993, 1995, 1999, 2001, 2003, 2005, 2011, 2015) |
| South Korea | 1 October 2018 | 5 (1987, 2003, 2007, 2009, 2015) |

^{1} Bold indicates champions for that year. Italic indicates hosts for that year.
^{2} Australia qualified as a member of the OFC for ten tournaments between 1985 and 2005.
