= Malaysia national under-16 football team =

National association football team

Malaysia U-17
- Nickname(s): Harimau Muda (Young Tigers)
- Association: Football Association of Malaysia
- Confederation: AFC (Asia)
- Sub-confederation: AFF (Southeast Asia)
- Head coach: Shukor Adan
- Home stadium: Bukit Jalil National Stadium
- FIFA code: MAS
First colours	Second colours

First international
- Singapore 0–0 Malaysia (Singapore; August 1980)

Biggest win
- Guam 0–15 Malaysia (Yangon, Myanmar; 12 June 2000)

Biggest defeat
- Croatia 11–0 Malaysia (Čakovec, Croatia; 7 November 2025)

AFC U-17 Asian Cup
- Appearances: 6 (first in 2004)
- Best result: Quarter-final (2014)

ASEAN U-16 Boys' Championship
- Appearances: 8 (first in 2002)
- Best result: Champions (2013, 2019)

The Malaysia national under-16 football team (also known as Malaysia under-16 or Malaysia U-16) represents Malaysia in international football competitions in ASEAN U-16 Boys' Championship, AFC U-17 Asian Cup and FIFA U-17 World Cup, as well as any other under-17 international football tournaments. The players in the current team mainly consist of players with age within 15 to 16 years old where the oldest players will be below the age requirement of 17 years old when the next U-17 tournament started.

== History ==
The team is considered to be the feeder team for the Malaysia national under-19 football team. It is for players aged 16 and less. Also in existence are national teams for Under-22s (Under-21s and Under-20s), Under-19s and Under-15s. As long as they are eligible, players can play at any level, hence it is possible for one to play for the U-16s, senior side and then again for the U-16s.

=== AFF U-16 Youth Championship ===
The team's best performance in the AFF U-16 Youth Championship was winning the 2013 edition in Myanmar.

Players were called up for the 2016 AFF U-16 Youth Championship in July 2016. The team did not manage to pass the group stage.

=== AFC U-16 Championship qualifying ===
Malaysia achieved their best ever quarter-final appearance in 2014 edition before being eliminated by Australia after a narrow 1–2 defeat. The team continued to show their improvement at youth level by advancing to the 2016 competition with three wins from four during their qualifying campaign under the guidance of coach P. Somasundram. The team targeting for reaching the semi-finals and qualify for the World Cup.

The team participated in the 2016 edition in Group C alongside South Korea, Oman, and Iraq. They were eventually knocked out of the campaign after failing to get past the group stage, being defeated 0–3 by both Oman and South Korea, before managing a 1–1 draw with Iraq, thus ending their chances to qualify for the 2017 FIFA U-17 World Cup.

=== FIFA U-17 World Cup qualifying ===
The team qualifying will be determined after AFC U-16 Youth Championship 2018 result.

=== NFDP collaboration ===
After a recent slump in performance of national team, Football Association of Malaysia (FAM) and National Football Development Programme (NFDP) has collaborated to increase the quality of grassroots football development in Malaysia in order to produce better players for the national team. The current target is to produce players which will represent Malaysia in Under 17 World Cup competition in near future.

== International records ==
=== FIFA U-17 World Cup ===
FIFA U-17 World Cup record
Year	Result	GP	W	D*	L	GS	GA
(China) 1985	Did not qualify						
(Canada) 1987	Did not qualify						
(Scotland) 1989	Did not qualify						
(Italy) 1991	Did not qualify						
(Japan) 1993	Did not qualify						
(Ecuador) 1995	Did not qualify						
(Egypt) 1997	Did not qualify						
(New Zealand) 1999	Did not qualify						
(Trinidad and Tobago) 2001	Did not qualify						
(Finland) 2003	Did not qualify						
(Peru) 2005	Did not qualify						
(South Korea) 2007	Did not qualify						
(Nigeria) 2009	Did not qualify						
(Mexico) 2011	Did not qualify						
(United Arab Emirates) 2013	Did not qualify						
(Chile) 2015	Did not qualify						
(India) 2017	Did not qualify						
(Brazil) 2019	Did not qualify						
(Peru) 2021	Did not qualify						
(Indonesia) 2023	Did not qualify						
(Qatar) 2025	Did not qualify						
(Qatar) 2026	Did not qualify						
Total	0/22	–	–	–	–	–	–

=== Asian Confederation ===
==== AFC U-17 Asian Cup ====
AFC U-17 Asian Cup record
Year	Result	GP	W	D*	L	GS	GA
(Qatar) 1985	Withdrew						
(Qatar) 1986	Did not qualify						
(Thailand) 1988	Did not qualify						
(United Arab Emirates) 1990	Did not qualify						
(Saudi Arabia) 1992	Did not qualify						
(Qatar) 1994	Did not qualify						
(Thailand) 1996	Did not qualify						
(Qatar) 1998	Did not qualify						
(Vietnam) 2000	Did not qualify						
(United Arab Emirates) 2002	Did not qualify						
(Japan) 2004	Group Stage	3	0	1	2	1	7
(Singapore) 2006	Did not qualify						
(Uzbekistan) 2008	Group Stage	3	1	0	2	5	7
(Uzbekistan) 2010	Did not qualify						
(Iran) 2012	Did not qualify						
(Thailand) 2014	Quarter-final	4	2	0	2	4	4
(India) 2016	Group Stage	3	0	1	2	1	7
(Malaysia) 2018	Group Stage	3	1	0	2	8	8
(Bahrain) ~~2020~~	Cancelled due to the COVID-19 pandemic						
(Thailand) 2023	Group Stage	3	1	0	2	2	8
(Saudi Arabia) 2025	Did not qualify						
(Saudi Arabia) 2026	Did not qualify						
(Uzbekistan) 2027	Did not qualify						
Total	Best: Quarter-final	19	5	2	12	21	41

=== ASEAN Confederation ===
==== AFF U17 Youth Championship ====
AFF U17 Youth Championship record
Year	Result	GP	W	D*	L	GS	GA
(Malaysia) (Indonesia) 2002	Fourth Place	4	3	0	1	12	8
(Thailand) 2005	Fourth Place	3	2	0	1	6	4
(Cambodia) 2007	Round 1	4	1	2	1	13	8
Total	Best: Fourth Place	11	6	2	3	31	20

==== AFF U-16 Youth Championship ====
AFF U16 Youth Championship record
Year	Result	GP	W	D*	L	GS	GA
(Indonesia) 2008	Third Place	4	2	1	1	6	5
(Laos) 2011	Group Stage	4	1	3	0	7	5
(Myanmar) 2013	Champions	6	3	3	0	13	3
(Cambodia) 2015	Group Stage	5	2	0	3	4	8
(Cambodia) 2016	Group Stage	5	2	1	2	6	12
(Thailand) 2017	Fourth Place	7	4	0	3	13	7
(Indonesia) 2018	Third Place	6	4	0	2	13	4
(Thailand) 2019	Champions	7	5	2	0	20	4
(Indonesia) 2022	Group Stage	3	1	2	0	6	3
(Indonesia) 2024	Group Stage	3	1	0	2	6	5
(Indonesia) 2026	Runners-up	5	3	0	2	6	7
Total	Best: Champions	55	28	12	15	100	63

=== Invited tournaments ===
Invited Tournament
Year	Tournament	Result	GP	W	D*	L	GS	GA
(Singapore) 1980	Lion City Cup	Round 1	5	1	2	2	3	12
(Singapore) 1981	Lion City Cup	Round 1	5	0	0	5	1	19
(Singapore) 1982	Lion City Cup	Round 1	4	1	0	3	5	7
(Singapore) 2005	Lion City Cup	Runners-up	5	3	1	1	11	3
(Singapore) 2006	Lion City Cup	Runners-up	4	2	1	1	3	3
(Malaysia) 2012	Frenz International Cup	Fourth Place	5	2	1	2	8	4
(Malaysia) 2014	FAM-FRENZ Asia Champions Trophy	Champions	13	8	3	2	44	17
(China) 2015	International Youth Championships	Champions	4	2	1	1	3	1
(China) 2016	Dream Come True Tournament	Runners-up	6	5	1	0	64	3
(India) 2016	AIFF Youth Cup	Fourth Place	5	0	2	3	5	12
(Japan) 2016	Bari Cup	Runners-up	5	4	0	1	20	5
(Italy) (Austria) (Slovenia) 2017	Tournament of Nations	Tenth Place	5	1	0	4	3	7
(Japan) 2018	JENESYS Japan-ASEAN Tournament	Fifth place	4	3	0	1	16	2
(Hong Kong) 2019	Jockey Club Football Tournament	Champions	3	3	0	0	11	1
(China) 2019	CFA U-16 Youth Football Tournament	Champions	3	2	1	0	5	2
(North Macedonia) 2022	UEFA U15 Development Tournament	Runners-up	3	1	2	0	5	3
(Switzerland) 2025	FIFA Youth Series	Fifth place	3	1	0	2	1	3
(Australia) 2025	Emerging Socceroos Championships	Tenth place	6	1	4	1	10	7
(Azerbaijan) 2026	FIFA U-15 World Cup & Festival	56th place	10	4	2	4	19	17
Total	Invited Tournament: 19 Tournaments	Best: Champions	98	44	21	33	237	128

== Results and fixtures ==
Win Draw Lose

=== 2026 ===
13 April ASEAN U-17 Boys' Championship group stage	Vietnam	4–0	Malaysia	Gresik, Indonesia
15:30 UTC+7	Lê Sỹ Bách 11', 27'; Nguyễn Văn Dương 38'; Nguyễn Mạnh Cường 56'	Report		Stadium: Gelora Joko Samudro Stadium; Referee: Choi Cheol-jun (South Korea)

16 April ASEAN U-17 Boys' Championship group stage	Malaysia	1–0	Indonesia	Gresik, Indonesia
19:30 UTC+7	Fareez 33'	Report		Stadium: Gelora Joko Samudro Stadium; Referee: Yusuke Ohashi (Japan)

19 April ASEAN U-17 Boys' Championship group stage	Malaysia	2–0	Timor-Leste	Gresik, Indonesia
19:30 UTC+7	Aniq Thaqif 9'; Adam Haikal 51'	Report		Stadium: Gelora Joko Samudro Stadium; Referee: Resul Mämmedow (Turkmenistan)

22 April ASEAN U-17 Boys' Championship semi-final	Laos	0–3	Malaysia	Sidoarjo, Indonesia
15:30 UTC+7		Report	Yusuf Nasrullah 7' (pen.); Aniq Thaqif 11'; Nilandone 58' (o.g.)	Stadium: Gelora Delta Stadium; Referee: Choi Cheol-jun (South Korea)

24 April ASEAN U-17 Boys' Championship final	Malaysia	0–3	Vietnam	Sidoarjo, Indonesia
19:30 UTC+7		Report	Đào Quý Vương 11'; Nguyễn Văn Dương 45+4', 54'	Stadium: Gelora Delta Stadium; Referee: Naufal Adya Fairuski (Indonesia)

4 July Garuda Championship Series 2026	Indonesia	1–1	Malaysia	Surakarta, Indonesia
20:00 UTC+7	Kusuma 80'	Report	Muzakif 90+6'	Stadium: Manahan Stadium; Referee: Clifford Daypuyat (Philippines)

7 July Garuda Championship Series 2026	Indonesia	3–0	Malaysia	Surakarta, Indonesia
20:00 UTC+7	Ramadhan 11'; Kusuma 21'; Majesta 43'	Report		Stadium: Manahan Stadium; Referee: Clifford Daypuyat (Philippines)

28 October Friendly	Malaysia	0–2	Indonesia	Gambang, Malaysia
--:-- UTC+8		Report	Jericho 27'; Alle 68'	Stadium: Mokhtar Dahari Academy

31 October Friendly	Malaysia	1–2	Indonesia	Gambang, Malaysia
--:-- UTC+8	Goal	Report	Kusuma; Azfar	Stadium: Mokhtar Dahari Academy

8 November 2027 AFC U-17 Asian Cup qualification	Palestine	2–0	Malaysia	Kuala Lumpur, Malaysia
21:00 UTC+8	Khalifah 16'; Alexander 51'	Report		Stadium: Kuala Lumpur Stadium; Referee: Ko Min-gook (South Korea)

14 November 2027 AFC U-17 Asian Cup qualification	Malaysia	2–1	Singapore	Kuala Lumpur, Malaysia
21:00 UTC+8	Syaifullah 32'; Fahim 88'	Report	Izzan 45'	Stadium: Kuala Lumpur Stadium; Referee: Mohamad Jafran Athambawa (Sri Lanka)

17 November 2027 AFC U-17 Asian Cup qualification	Malaysia	10–0	Guam	Kuala Lumpur, Malaysia
21:00 UTC+8	Azam Muslim 8'; Brian Felix 13', 40'; Muzakif Fitri 21', 34'; Shah Haqiqullah 40'; Fazryel Ashraf 43', 45+3', 90+3'; Haziq 65'	Report		Stadium: Kuala Lumpur Stadium; Referee: Dan Ning (China)

20 November 2027 AFC U-17 Asian Cup qualification	India	0–0	Malaysia	Kuala Lumpur, Malaysia
21:00 UTC+8		Report		Stadium: Kuala Lumpur Stadium; Referee: Mario Cheung Wai Lung (Hong Kong)

=== 2026 (U-15) ===
24 October 2026 FIFA U-15 World Cup & Festival	Dominica	1–3	Malaysia	Baku, Azerbaijan
10:15 UTC+4	28' (pen.)	Report	Aqheef Haiqal 12'; Anas Suffiyan 17'; Amirul Faris 39'	Stadium: Hövsan Competition Complex

25 October 2026 FIFA U-15 World Cup & Festival	Syria	1–3	Malaysia	Baku, Azerbaijan
09:00 UTC+4	36'	Report	Danny Firas 17'; Iman Lutfi 32', 35'	Stadium: Hövsan Competition Complex

25 October 2026 FIFA U-15 World Cup & Festival	Malaysia	5–0	Ethiopia	Baku, Azerbaijan
15:45 UTC+4	Danny Firas 4'; Aqheef Haiqal 21', 23'; Iman Lutfi 29', 39'	Report		Stadium: Hövsan Competition Complex

26 October 2026 FIFA U-15 World Cup & Festival	Malaysia	1–1	Hungary	Baku, Azerbaijan
11:30 UTC+4	Iman Lutfi 23' (pen.)	Report	20'	Stadium: Hövsan Competition Complex

26 October 2026 FIFA U-15 World Cup & Festival	Mexico	1–0	Malaysia	Baku, Azerbaijan
18:15 UTC+4	38'	Report		Stadium: Hövsan Competition Complex

28 October 2026 FIFA U-15 World Cup & Festival	South Africa	6–2	Malaysia	Baku, Azerbaijan
12:45 UTC+4	3', 9', 21', 26'; 4'; 33'	Report	Danny Firas 7' (pen.); Mikhaeel Yee 22'	Stadium: Hövsan Competition Complex

28 October 2026 FIFA U-15 World Cup & Festival	Malaysia	4–2	Jamaica	Baku, Azerbaijan
19:30 UTC+4	Armin Haikal 2'; Iman Lutfi 5', 8'; Rayyan Haziq 24'	Report	11'; 39'	Stadium: Hövsan Competition Complex

29 October 2026 FIFA U-15 World Cup & Festival	Malaysia	1–3	China	Baku, Azerbaijan
10:15 UTC+4	Anas Suffiyan 16'	Report	14', 34'; 32'	Stadium: Hövsan Competition Complex

29 October 2026 FIFA U-15 World Cup & Festival	Qatar	0–0 (5–4 p)	Malaysia	Baku, Azerbaijan
17:00 UTC+4		Report		Stadium: Hövsan Competition Complex
	Penalties
	Penalty scored		Penalty scored Penalty missed

30 October 2026 FIFA U-15 World Cup & Festival	Malaysia	0–2	Lebanon	Baku, Azerbaijan
10:15 UTC+4		Report	16'; 35'	Stadium: Hövsan Competition Complex

== Players ==
=== Current squad ===
The following players were finalised for the 2027 AFC U-17 Asian Cup qualification.

No.	Pos.	Player	Date of birth (age)	Club
1	GK	Adam Nurfakrullah Mohd Fadli	4 January 2010 (age 16)	(Football Association of Malaysia) Sekolah Sukan Malaysia Pahang
16	GK	Ahmad Airil Ridzman Ahmad Ridzalman	4 March 2010 (age 16)	(Football Association of Malaysia) SMK Taman Desa Skudai
23	GK	Muhammad Haziq Fikri Zolkiflee	28 January 2010 (age 16)	(Football Association of Malaysia) Sekolah Sukan Malaysia Pahang
2	DF	Mohammad Amsyar Naufal Mohd Zaizielanaim	26 July 2010 (age 16)	(Football Association of Malaysia) SMK Taman Desa Skudai
3	DF	Muhammad Adam Haikal Muhammad Afifi	2 June 2010 (age 16)	(Football Association of Malaysia) SMK Gambang
4	DF	Adam Muqri Muhaizam	16 January 2010 (age 16)	(Football Association of Malaysia) SMK Gambang
5	DF	Muhammad Fareez Danial Fadzly	12 January 2010 (age 16)	(Football Association of Malaysia) SMK Taman Desa Skudai
7	DF	Mohamad Fazryel Ashraf Zefri	26 February 2010 (age 16)	(Football Association of Malaysia) SMK Taman Desa Skudai
14	DF	Muhammad Harraz Ajwad Mohamad Hafizan	14 April 2010 (age 16)	(Football Association of Malaysia) Sekolah Sukan Malaysia Pahang
19	DF	Muhammad Aqif Syameel Muhamad Fairul	15 March 2010 (age 16)	(Football Association of Malaysia) SMK Taman Desa Skudai
20	DF	Muhammad Shah Haqiqullah Shahrul Al Faiza	5 February 2010 (age 16)	(Football Association of Malaysia) SMK Ibrahim Fikri
21	DF	Danish Haykal Faisal	(age 16)	(Football Association of Malaysia) Sekolah Sukan Malaysia Pahang
22	DF	Naim Musaddiq Mohd Sabri	25 March 2010 (age 16)	(Football Association of Malaysia) SMK Ibrahim Fikri
6	MF	Muhammad Aniq Thaqif Hairulnizam	9 January 2010 (age 16)	(Football Association of Malaysia) Sekolah Sukan Tunku Mahkota Ismail
8	MF	Muhammad Dini Mazlan	12 February 2010 (age 16)	(Football Association of Malaysia) Sekolah Sukan Malaysia Pahang
15	MF	Ahmad Aidil Mukhridz Ahmad Rizalman	4 March 2010 (age 16)	(Football Association of Malaysia) SMK Taman Desa Skudai
18	MF	Dawud Imran Rozlin	11 April 2010 (age 16)	(Football Association of Malaysia) Sekolah Sukan Malaysia Pahang
9	FW	Ahmad Muzakif Fitri Muhamad	17 May 2011 (age 15)	(Football Association of Malaysia) SMK Gambang
10	FW	Mohamad Fahim Akmal Zulkarnain	3 January 2010 (age 16)	(Football Association of Malaysia) SMK Taman Desa Skudai
11	FW	Nur Azam Muslim Nor Hisham	9 January 2011 (age 15)	(Football Association of Malaysia) SMK Gambang
12	FW	Brian Felix a/k Harrison Paulus	24 September 2010 (age 16)	(Football Association of Malaysia) Sekolah Sukan Malaysia Pahang
13	FW	Muhammad Syaifullah Mahruzi	13 February 2010 (age 16)	(Football Association of Malaysia) Sekolah Sukan Malaysia Pahang
17	FW	Muhammed Haziq Shakirin	1 February 2010 (age 16)	(Football Association of Malaysia) SSBJ

The following players were finalised for the 2026 FIFA U-15 World Cup & Festival in Baku, Azerbaijan.

No.	Pos.	Player	Date of birth (age)	Club
	GK	Muhammad Ariq Fayyadh Raimi	2 April 2011 (age 15)	(Football Association of Malaysia) SMK Gambang
	GK	Muhammad Harith Musyrif Hairy	5 January 2011 (age 15)	(Football Association of Malaysia) SMK Taman Desa Skudai
	DF	Amirul Faris Azlan @ Iskandar Shah	10 January 2011 (age 15)	(Football Association of Malaysia) SMK Gambang
	DF	Muhammad Ammar Mohd Saiful Hisham	22 February 2011 (age 15)	(Football Association of Malaysia) SMK Gambang
	DF	Muhammad Harris Haneef Zulkiffli	23 September 2011 (age 15)	(Football Association of Malaysia) SMK Gambang
	DF	Muhammad Adib Mohamed Ezammuddin	1 January 2011 (age 15)	(Football Association of Malaysia) SMK Gambang
	DF	Danny Firas Musleyadi	25 March 2011 (age 15)	(Football Association of Malaysia) SMK Taman Desa Skudai
	DF	Muhammad Rayyan Haziq Ahfizal Ahmad	3 June 2011 (age 15)	(Football Association of Malaysia) SMK Taman Desa Skudai
	MF	Muhammad Hykal Iqwan Azlan	13 April 2011 (age 15)	(Football Association of Malaysia) SMK Gambang
	MF	Anas Suffiyan Mohamad Arif	8 August 2011 (age 15)	(Football Association of Malaysia) SMK Gambang
	MF	Muhammad Mikhaeel Yee Mohd Mubeen Yee	29 July 2011 (age 15)	(Football Association of Malaysia) SMK Gambang
	FW	Muhammad Iman Luthfi Zairol Hisham	21 October 2011 (age 15)	(Football Association of Malaysia) SMK Gambang
	FW	Armin Haikal Hazim	8 April 2011 (age 15)	(Football Association of Malaysia) SMK Gambang
	FW	Aqheef Haiqal Koko	12 January 2011 (age 15)	(Football Association of Malaysia) SMK Taman Desa Skudai

=== Recent call-ups ===
The following players were previously called up to the squad.

Pos.	Player	Date of birth (age)	Caps	Goals	Club	Latest call-up
GK	Muhammad Nabil Sukiman	12 July 2011 (age 15)			(Malaysia) SMK Gambang	October 2026 U-15 training camp
GK	Muhd Atiff Mohd Norhisham	19 February 2010 (age 16)			(Malaysia) SMK Ibrahim Fikri	vs Indonesia, July 2026
GK	Adrian Muslim Sufian	13 May 2009 (age 17)	-	-	Sekolah Sukan Malaysia Pahang	2026 AFC U-17 Asian Cup qualification
GK	Aiman Khaufly Hanafi	19 January 2009 (age 17)			(Malaysia) SMK Taman Desa Skudai	2026 AFC U-17 Asian Cup qualification
GK	Muhammad Hakiim Rosli	27 February 2009 (age 17)			(Malaysia) SMK Taman Desa Skudai	2026 AFC U-17 Asian Cup qualification
DF	Muhammad Qayyum Syazwan Mohd Raffa	20 August 2010 (age 16)	-	-	Sekolah Sukan Malaysia Pahang	November 2026 training camp
DF	Emir Nadhif bin Elmi-Rizal	2 February 2010 (age 16)	-	-	(Malaysia) Sekolah Sukan Tunku Mahkota Ismail	November 2026 training camp
DF	Ahmad Ahnaf Dzul Affendi	7 March 2011 (age 15)			(Malaysia) SMK Gambang	October 2026 U-15 training camp
DF	Darwin a/l Tamil Vanaan	1 February 2011 (age 15)			(Malaysia) SMK Gambang	October 2026 U-15 training camp
DF	Muhammad Afiq Akram Yusni	11 April 2011 (age 15)			(Malaysia) SMK Gambang	October 2026 U-15 training camp
DF	Zazuan Asyraff Jefferi	5 September 2010 (age 16)			Sekolah Sukan Malaysia Pahang	vs. Indonesia, July 2026
DF	Muhammad Hairul Nurulasyikin	31 January 2010 (age 16)			(Malaysia) SMK Taman Desa Skudai	vs. Indonesia, July 2026
DF	Mohd Faiz Nazrin Anuar	25 January 2010 (age 16)	-	-	Sekolah Sukan Malaysia Pahang	2026 AFC U-17 Asian Cup qualification
DF	Muhammad Syazani Yussairi Yusnazairi	5 November 2009 (age 17)			Sekolah Sukan Malaysia Pahang	2026 AFC U-17 Asian Cup qualification
DF	Tan Zheng Hang	23 December 2010 (age 15)			(Malaysia) SMK Taman Desa Skudai	2026 AFC U-17 Asian Cup qualification
DF	Nourrul Ezzery Mohamad Nor Lizam	21 September 2009 (age 17)			Sekolah Sukan Malaysia Pahang	2026 AFC U-17 Asian Cup qualification
DF	Tengku Ahmad Darwis Tengku Daud	18 February 2009 (age 17)			(Malaysia) Mokhtar Dahari Academy	2026 AFC U-17 Asian Cup qualification
DF	Muhammad Amirul Haziq Mazlam	6 May 2009 (age 17)			Sekolah Sukan Malaysia Pahang	2026 AFC U-17 Asian Cup qualification
DF	Aqhyl Faiesal Ahmad Famy	21 March 2009 (age 17)			(Malaysia) SMK Taman Desa Skudai	2026 AFC U-17 Asian Cup qualification
MF	Muhammad Haziq Zamin	1 September 2010 (age 16)			Sekolah Sukan Malaysia Pahang	November 2026 training camp
MF	Muhammad Zahirul Haq Mohd Rizal	23 February 2010 (age 16)			(Malaysia) SMK Taman Desa Skudai	November 2026 training camp
MF	Muhammad Airis Rizqin Razeiman Azlan	9 May 2011 (age 15)			(Malaysia) SMK Gambang	October 2026 U-15 training camp
MF	Muhammad Razin Aqeef Nazmi	26 August 2011 (age 15)			(Malaysia) SMK Gambang	October 2026 U-15 training camp
MF	Mohd Aiman Haqimi Mohd Sanusi	4 April 2010 (age 16)			(Malaysia) SMK Gambang	2026 ASEAN U-17 Boys' Championship
MF	Muhammad Nurikhwan Hazeem Mohd Fadhil	22 March 2009 (age 17)			Sekolah Sukan Malaysia Pahang	2026 AFC U-17 Asian Cup qualification
MF	Muhammad Iman Irfan Muhammad Hapis	9 June 2009 (age 17)			Sekolah Sukan Malaysia Pahang	2026 AFC U-17 Asian Cup qualification
MF	Muhammad Nabil Ikhwan Mohd Zaidi	18 April 2009 (age 17)			(Malaysia) Sekolah Menengah Kebangsaan Dato Harun	2026 AFC U-17 Asian Cup qualification
MF	Taufiquul Hakim Mohd Azlan	15 February 2009 (age 17)			Sekolah Sukan Malaysia Pahang	2026 AFC U-17 Asian Cup qualification
MF	Muhammad Syakir Zamri	27 April 2009 (age 17)			(Malaysia) SMK Taman Desa Skudai	2026 AFC U-17 Asian Cup qualification
MF	Carrick Sipri	22 January 2009 (age 17)			(Malaysia) SMK Taman Desa Skudai	2026 AFC U-17 Asian Cup qualification
FW	Amsyar Mohd Zulfadli	28 February 2010 (age 16)			Sekolah Sukan Malaysia Pahang	November 2026 training camp
FW	Benjamin Aryan Mohd Norli	9 August 2010 (age 16)			(Malaysia) SMK Taman Desa Skudai	November 2026 training camp
FW	Muhammad Arif Haziq Azi Sham	(age 16)	-	-	(Malaysia) SMK Tinggi Kajang	November 2026 training camp
FW	Muhammad Ammar Idrakie Khairil Anuar	23 July 2011 (age 15)			(Malaysia) SMK Gambang	October 2026 U-15 training camp
FW	Muhammad Shahril Izwan Zainuddin	(age 15)			(Malaysia) SMK Ibrahim Fikri	October 2026 U-15 training camp
FW	Ahmad Yusuf Nasrullah Ahmad Ramli	18 June 2010 (age 16)			Sekolah Sukan Malaysia Pahang	vs. Indonesia, July 2026
FW	Bishran Balhaqy Shahrul Junaidy	26 February 2010 (age 16)			Sekolah Sukan Malaysia Pahang	2026 ASEAN U-17 Boys' Championship
FW	Muhammad Shukri Nasri	26 May 2010 (age 16)	-	-	Sekolah Sukan Malaysia Pahang	2026 ASEAN U-17 Boys' Championship
FW	Mohamad Iman Danish Mohd Shukor	26 March 2009 (age 17)			Sekolah Sukan Malaysia Pahang	2026 AFC U-17 Asian Cup qualification
FW	Arayyan Hakeem Norizam	13 September 2009 (age 17)			(Malaysia) SMK Taman Desa Skudai	2026 AFC U-17 Asian Cup qualification
FW	Muhammad Alif Ashraf Mohd Abd Rahman	30 January 2009 (age 17)			Sekolah Sukan Malaysia Pahang	2026 AFC U-17 Asian Cup qualification
FW	Arfan Haziq Ahmad Marzuki	21 January 2009 (age 17)			Sekolah Sukan Malaysia Pahang	2026 AFC U-17 Asian Cup qualification

== Coaching staff ==
Malaysia national football U17 team management
Roles	Names
Head coach	(Malaysia) Shukor Adan
Assistant coach	(Malaysia) Lim Chan Yew
Assistant coach	(Malaysia) Kuizwan Johari
Assistant coach	(Japan) Teshima Atsushi
Goalkeeping coach	(Malaysia) Farizal Harun
Fitness coach	(Malaysia) Rueben Jude Balraj
Fitness coach	(Japan) Hiroto Yokoyama
Team manager	(Malaysia) A. Christopher Raj
Kitman	(Malaysia) Suhardi Abang Usop
Team admin	(Malaysia) Mohd Razihanif Che Razak
Team analyst	(Malaysia) Zaquan Adha
Team analyst	(South Korea) Lee Jeyoon
Physiotherapist	(Malaysia) Nabil Fikri Kamaruddin
Masseur	(Malaysia) Mohd Nazrin Mohd Nor
Team doctor	(Malaysia) Ridzuan Azmi
Media officer	(Malaysia) Vincent Wong Yew Sing

== Coaching history ==
- (Malaysia) S. Balachandran (2013–2014)
- (Malaysia) Somasundram a/l Periasamy (2015–2016)
- (Malaysia) Lim Teong Kim (2017–2018)
- (Malaysia) P. Maniam (2019)
- (Malaysia) Osmera Omaro (2022–2024)
- (Spain) Javier Jordi Ribera (2024–2025)
- (Malaysia) Noor Zaidi Rohmat (2025)
- (Spain) Javier Jordi Ribera (2025–2026)
- (Malaysia) Shukor Adan (2026–)

== Honours ==
=== Regional ===
- ASEAN U-16 Boys' Championship
  - (gold) Winners (2): 2013, 2019
  - (bronze) Third Place (2): 2008, 2018

=== Others ===
- Lion City Cup:
  - (silver) Runner-up (2): 2005, 2006

== See also ==
- Malaysia national football team
- Malaysia women's national football team
- Malaysia national under-23 football team
- Malaysia national under-22 football team
- Malaysia national under-19 football team

== Head-to-head record ==
The following table shows Malaysia's head-to-head record in the AFC U-17 Asian Cup.

Opponent	Pld	W	D	L	GF	GA	GD	Win %
Australia	1	0	0	1	1	2	−1	0.00
India	1	0	0	1	1	2	−1	0.00
Iran	1	0	0	1	0	5	−5	0.00
Iraq	1	0	1	0	1	1	+0	0.00
Japan	2	0	0	2	0	6	−6	0.00
Kuwait	1	0	1	0	0	0	+0	0.00
Laos	1	1	0	0	2	1	+1	100.00
Oman	2	1	0	1	2	4	−2	50.00
South Korea	2	0	0	2	0	4	−4	0.00
Tajikistan	1	1	0	0	6	2	+4	100.00
Thailand	3	1	0	2	3	7	−4	33.33
United Arab Emirates	1	0	0	1	2	3	−1	0.00
Yemen	2	1	0	1	3	4	−1	50.00
Total	19	5	2	12	21	41	−20	26.32
