= ASEAN U-17 Boys' Championship =

- Organiser(s): AFF
- Founded: 2002
- Region: Southeast Asia
- Teams: varying
- Current champions: Vietnam (4th title)
- Most championships: Vietnam (4 titles)
- 2026 ASEAN U-17 Boys' Championship

The ASEAN U-17 Boys' Championship (formerly AFF U-16 Youth Championship, ASEAN U-16 Boys' Championship) is an annual international football competition contested by the national teams of the members of the ASEAN Football Federation (AFF) and occasionally invited nations from the rest of Asia.

The tournament used to be played at under-17 level, however the AFF followed the lead of the Asian Football Confederation after they renamed its U-17 competition to fall in line with FIFA's naming conventions and also to reflect the age of the players at the competition. The competition was first held in 2002 and resumed in 2005.

== Summary ==
Year	Host	Final			Third place match
Year	Host	Champions	Score	Runners-up	Third place	Score	Fourth place
2002; Details	Indonesia; Malaysia	Myanmar	4–1	Laos	Indonesia	1–0	Malaysia
2005; Details	Thailand	Myanmar	1–1 (4–3 p)	Thailand	Laos	3–1	Malaysia
2006; Details	Vietnam	Vietnam	RR	Myanmar	Bangladesh	RR	Laos
2007; Details	Cambodia	Thailand	3–2	Laos	Vietnam	1–1 (4–3 p)	Indonesia
2008; Details	Indonesia	Australia	1–1 (5–4 p)	Bahrain	Malaysia	3–0	Singapore
2009; Details	Thailand	Cancelled
2010; Details	Indonesia	Vietnam	1–0	China	Timor-Leste	2–0	Indonesia
2011; Details	Laos	Thailand	1–0	Laos	Myanmar	2–1	Singapore
2012; Details	Laos	Japan	3–1	Australia	Laos	3–0	Thailand
2013; Details	Myanmar	Malaysia	1–1 (3–2 p)	Indonesia	Australia	0–0 (7–6 p)	Vietnam
2014	Indonesia	Cancelled
2015; Details	Cambodia	Thailand	3–0	Myanmar	Australia	10–2	Laos
2016; Details	Cambodia	Australia	3–3 (5–3 p)	Vietnam	Thailand	3–0	Cambodia
2017; Details	Thailand	Vietnam	0–0 (4–2 p)	Thailand	Australia	3–2	Malaysia
2018; Details	Indonesia	Indonesia	1–1 (4–3 p)	Thailand	Malaysia	1–0	Myanmar
2019; Details	Thailand	Malaysia	2–1	Thailand	Indonesia	0–0 (3–2 p)	Vietnam
2022; Details	Indonesia	Indonesia	1–0	Vietnam	Thailand	3–0	Myanmar
2024; Details	Indonesia	Australia	1–1 (8–7 p)	Thailand	Indonesia	5–0	Vietnam
2026; Details	Indonesia	Vietnam	3–0	Malaysia	Australia	8–0	Laos

== Performance by country ==
Nation	Champions	Runners-up	Third place	Fourth place
Vietnam	4 (2006, 2010, 2017, 2026)	2 (2016, 2022)	1 (2007)	3 (2013, 2019, 2024)
Thailand	3 (2007, 2011, 2015)	5 (2005, 2017, 2018, 2019, 2024)	2 (2016, 2022)	1 (2012)
Australia	3 (2008, 2016, 2024)	1 (2012)	4 (2013, 2015, 2017, 2026)	—
Myanmar	2 (2002, 2005)	2 (2006, 2015)	1 (2011)	2 (2018, 2022)
Indonesia	2 (2018, 2022)	1 (2013)	3 (2002, 2019, 2024)	2 (2007, 2010)
Malaysia	2 (2013, 2019)	1 (2026)	2 (2008, 2018)	3 (2002, 2005, 2017)
Japan	1 (2012)	—	—	—
Laos	—	3 (2002, 2007, 2011)	2 (2005, 2012)	3 (2006, 2015, 2026)
Bahrain	—	1 (2008)	—	—
China	—	1 (2010)	—	—
Bangladesh	—	—	1 (2006)	—
Timor-Leste	—	—	1 (2010)	—
Singapore	—	—	—	2 (2008, 2011)
Cambodia	—	—	—	1 (2016)

== Participating nations ==
Team	(Indonesia) (Malaysia) 2002 (10)	(Thailand) 2005 (7)	(Vietnam) 2006 (4)	(Cambodia) 2007 (9)	(Indonesia) 2008 (5)	(Indonesia) 2010 (4)	(Laos) 2011 (10)	(Laos) 2012 (4)	(Myanmar) 2013 (10)	(Cambodia) 2015 (11)	(Cambodia) 2016 (11)	(Thailand) 2017 (12)	(Indonesia) 2018 (11)	(Thailand) 2019 (12)	(Indonesia) 2022 (12)	(Indonesia) 2024 (12)	(Indonesia) 2026 (12)	Total
Australia	×	×	×	×	1st	×	×	2nd	3rd	3rd	1st	3rd	×	GS	GS	1st	3rd	10
Brunei	GS	×	×	GS	×	×	×	×	GS	GS	GS	GS	GS	GS	GS	GS	GS	11
Cambodia	GS	GS	×	GS	×	×	GS	×	GS	GS	4th	GS	GS	GS	GS	GS	GS	13
Indonesia	3rd	GS	×	4th	GS	4th	GS	×	2nd	×	×	GS	1st	3rd	1st	3rd	GS	13
Laos	2nd	3rd	4th	2nd	×	×	2nd	3rd	GS	4th	GS	GS	GS	GS	GS	GS	4th	15
Malaysia	4th	4th	×	GS	3rd	×	GS	×	1st	GS	GS	4th	3rd	1st	GS	GS	2nd	14
Myanmar	1st	1st	2nd	GS	×	×	3rd	×	GS	2nd	GS	GS	4th	GS	4th	GS	GS	14
Philippines	GS	×	×	×	×	×	GS	×	GS	GS	GS	GS	GS	GS	GS	GS	GS	11
Singapore	GS	×	×	GS	4th	×	4th	×	GS	GS	GS	GS	GS	GS	GS	GS	GS	13
Thailand	GS	2nd	×	1st	×	×	1st	4th	×	1st	3rd	2nd	2nd	2nd	3rd	2nd	GS	13
Timor-Leste	×	×	×	×	×	3rd	GS	×	×	GS	GS	GS	GS	GS	GS	GS	GS	10
Vietnam	GS	GS	1st	3rd	×	1st	GS	×	4th	GS	2nd	1st	GS	4th	2nd	4th	1st	15
Invitees
Bahrain	×	×	×	×	2nd	×	×	×	×	×	×	×	×	×	×	×	×	1
Bangladesh	×	×	3rd	×	×	×	×	×	×	×	×	×	×	×	×	×	×	1
China	×	×	×	×	×	2nd	×	×	×	×	×	×	×	×	×	×	×	1
Japan	×	×	×	×	×	×	×	1st	×	×	×	×	×	×	×	×	×	1

Legend

- 1st — Champions
- 2nd — Runners-up
- 3rd — Third place
- 4th — Fourth place
- GS — Group stage
- Q — Qualified for the current tournament
- × — Did not enter / Withdrew / Banned
- — Hosts

== All-time ranking table ==
As of 2026

Rank	Team	Part	Pld	W	D	L	F	A	GD	Pts	Best finish
1	Thailand	13	70	45	13	12	163	67	+96	148	Champions (2007, 2011, 2015)
2	Vietnam	15	75	41	13	21	198	89	+109	136	Champions (2006, 2010, 2017, 2026)
3	Malaysia	14	66	34	14	18	131	83	+48	116	Champions (2013, 2019)
4	Myanmar	14	66	34	10	22	142	94	+48	112	Champions (2002, 2005)
5	Australia	10	53	32	12	9	199	67	+132	108	Champions (2008, 2016, 2024)
6	Laos	15	70	31	14	25	118	110	+8	107	Runners-up (2002, 2007, 2011)
7	Indonesia	13	64	28	17	19	121	81	+40	101	Champions (2018, 2022)
8	Cambodia	13	53	15	11	27	63	98	–35	56	Fourth place (2016)
9	Singapore	13	53	11	9	33	73	121	–48	42	Fourth place (2008, 2011)
10	Timor-Leste	10	39	8	7	24	57	104	–47	31	Third place (2010)
11	Philippines	11	45	4	4	37	31	169	–138	16	Group stage (11 times)
12	Japan	1	4	3	1	0	10	2	+8	10	Champions (2012)
13	Bahrain	1	5	2	2	1	6	4	+2	8	Runners-up (2008)
14	Brunei	11	44	1	4	39	12	235	–223	7	Group stage (11 times)
15	China	1	4	2	0	2	4	3	+1	6	Runners-up (2010)
16	Bangladesh	1	3	1	0	2	4	7	–3	3	Third place (2006)

== See also ==
- AFC U-17 Asian Cup
- ASEAN Football Federation
