= 2008 AFF U-16 Youth Championship =

AFF U-16 Youth Championship Indonesia 2008

Tournament details
- Host country: Indonesia
- City: Jakarta
- Dates: 9–19 July
- Teams: 5 (from 2 confederations)
- Venue: 1 (in 1 host city)

Final positions
- Champions: Australia (1st title)
- Runners-up: Bahrain
- Third place: Malaysia
- Fourth place: Singapore

Tournament statistics
- Matches played: 12
- Goals scored: 32 (2.67 per match)
- Top scorer(s): (Australia) Kamal Ibrahim (Australia) Kerem Bulut (4 goals)

The 2008 AFF U-16 Youth Championship is the first edition of the tournament as an under-16 youth championship as it was previously played at under-17 level. It took place in Jakarta, Indonesia in July 2008.

Only five nations took part which includes associate AFF member Australia and guest nation Bahrain, competing in a round-robin format with the top two teams playing in the final.

== Participant teams ==
- Australia
- Bahrain
- Indonesia
- Malaysia
- Singapore

== Tournament ==
All times are Western Indonesian Time (WIT) – UTC+7

=== Group stage ===
Team	Pld	W	D	L	GF	GA	GD	Pts
Australia	4	3	1	0	13	3	+10	10
Bahrain	4	2	1	1	5	3	+2	7
Malaysia	4	2	1	1	6	5	+1	7
Singapore	4	0	2	2	2	5	−3	2
Indonesia	4	0	1	3	1	11	−10	1

9 July 2008
16:00

Australia	2–1	Bahrain
Ibrahim 34'; Lum 88' (pen.)	Report 1 Report 2	Saeed 20'

Lebak Bulus Stadium
Referee: P. Pandian (Singapore)

9 July 2008
19:00

Singapore	0–2	Malaysia
Mohamad Firman Mohd Hanif (yellow card) (yellow-red card)	Report	Gary Steven Robbat 33'; Mohammad Aminuddin Samki 81'

Lebak Bulus Stadium
Referee: Allan Martinez (Philippines)

11 July 2008
16:00

Bahrain	1–0	Singapore
Ali ?'	Report	Muhammad Shahfiq Ghani (yellow card) (yellow-red card)

Lebak Bulus Stadium

11 July 2008
19:00

Indonesia	0–6	Australia
	Report	Hamill 15'; Bulut 25'; Yabio 32'; Abduh Lestaluhu 48' (o.g.); Ibrahim 57'; Costa 83'

Lebak Bulus Stadium

13 July 2008
16:00

Australia	4–1	Malaysia
Ibrahim 51', 55'; Bulut 83', 90'	Report	D. Saarvindran 62'

Lebak Bulus Stadium

13 July 2008
19:00

Bahrain	2–0	Indonesia
Ishaq 34'; Aldakheel 62'	Report

Lebak Bulus Stadium

15 July 2008
16:00

Malaysia	2–0	Indonesia
Ahmad Fauzan Yahya 67'; Mohamed Amer Saidin 88'	Report

Lebak Bulus Stadium

15 July 2008
19:00

Singapore	1–1	Australia
Muhammad Muhaymin Salim 46'	Report	Bulut 42'

Lebak Bulus Stadium

17 July 2008
16:00

Indonesia	1–1	Singapore
Agamal 57'	Report	Muhammad Muhaymin Salim 3'

Lebak Bulus Stadium

17 July 2008
19:00

Malaysia	1–1	Bahrain
Ahmad Fauzan Yahya 15'	Report	Aldakheel 90'

Lebak Bulus Stadium

=== Third place play-off ===
19 July 2008
16:00

Malaysia	3–0	Singapore
D. Saarvindran 29'; Sabri Sahar 64'; Iffi Afinaz Ismail 80'	Report

Lebak Bulus Stadium

=== Final ===
19 July 2008
19:00

Australia	1–1 (a.e.t.)	Bahrain
Marc Warren 87'	Report	Ali Muneer Redha 44'
Penalties
unknown other penalty kickers Brendan Hamill (penalty missed); Kerem Bulut (penalty scored)	5–4	unknown other penalty kickers (penalty missed) Salman Ahmed Aldakheel; (penalty missed) Abdulla Khalifa Mohamed

Lebak Bulus Stadium

== Winner ==
2008 AFF U-16 Youth Championship winners

Australia
First title

== Goalscorers ==
4 goals

- (Australia) Kamal Ibrahim
- (Australia) Kerem Bulut

2 goals

- (Bahrain) Salman Ahmed Aldakheel
- (Singapore) Muhammad Muhaymin Salim
- (Malaysia) D. Saarvindran
- (Malaysia) Ahmad Fauzan Yahya

1 goal

- (Australia) Joseph Costa
- (Australia) Brendan Hamill
- (Australia) Jared Lum
- (Australia) Marc Warren
- (Australia) Tedros Alemaw Yabio

1 goal

- (Bahrain) Sayed Dhiya Saeed
- (Bahrain) Ahmed Isa Ali
- (Bahrain) Hasan Ahmed Ishaq
- (Bahrain) Ali Muneer Redha
- (Indonesia) Fahreza Agamal
- (Malaysia) Garry Steven Robbat
- (Malaysia) Mohammad Aminuddin Samki
- (Malaysia) Mohamed Amer Saidin
- (Malaysia) Sabri Sahar
- (Malaysia) Iffi Afinaz Ismail

Own goal

- (Indonesia) Abduh Lestaluhu (for Australia)
