= 2002 AFF U-17 Youth Championship =

Tournament details
- Host countries: Malaysia; Indonesia
- City: Kuala Lumpur; Medan
- Dates: 19 February – 2 March
- Teams: 10 (from 1 confederation)
- Venue(s): 2 (in 2 host cities)

Final positions
- Champions: Myanmar (1st title)
- Runners-up: Laos
- Third place: Indonesia
- Fourth place: Malaysia

Tournament statistics
- Matches played: 24
- Goals scored: 102 (4.25 per match)

The 2002 AFF U-17 Youth Championship was the inaugural edition of the tournament. It took place from 19 February to 2 March 2002 with all 10 ASEAN Football Federation members taking part. It was co-hosted by Malaysia and Indonesia.

== Tournament ==
=== Group stage ===
==== Group A ====
- All matches played in Malaysia.

Team	Pld	W	D	L	GF	GA	GD	Pts
Myanmar	4	4	0	0	28	2	+26	12
Malaysia	4	3	0	1	12	8	+4	9
Vietnam	4	1	1	2	14	11	+3	4
Singapore	4	1	1	2	11	11	0	4
Brunei	4	0	0	4	0	33	−33	0

19 February 2002

Vietnam	2 – 6	Myanmar

Kuala Lumpur
19 February 2002

Malaysia	4 – 1	Singapore

Kuala Lumpur

20 February 2002

Brunei	0 – 6	Malaysia

Kuala Lumpur
20 February 2002

Singapore	3 – 3	Vietnam

Kuala Lumpur

21 February 2002

Myanmar	11 – 0	Brunei

Kuala Lumpur

22 February 2002

Malaysia	2 – 0	Vietnam

Kuala Lumpur
22 February 2002

Singapore	0 – 4	Myanmar

Kuala Lumpur

24 February 2002

Brunei	0 – 7	Singapore

Kuala Lumpur
24 February 2002

Myanmar	7 – 0	Malaysia

Kuala Lumpur

25 February 2002

Vietnam	9 – 0	Brunei

Kuala Lumpur

==== Group B ====
- All matches played in Indonesia

Team	Pld	W	D	L	GF	GA	GD	Pts
Laos	4	2	2	0	7	4	+3	8
Indonesia	4	2	1	1	8	2	+6	7
Thailand	4	1	2	1	13	6	+7	5
Cambodia	4	1	2	1	1	2	−1	5
Philippines	4	0	1	3	2	17	−15	1

19 February 2002

Indonesia	2 – 1	Thailand

Medan
Attendance: 15.000
19 February 2002

Laos	1 – 1	Philippines

Medan

20 February 2002

Cambodia	0 – 0	Indonesia

Medan
Attendance: 15.000
20 February 2002

Thailand	3 – 3	Laos

Medan

22 February 2002

Philippines	0 – 1	Cambodia

Medan
22 February 2002

Indonesia	0 – 1	Laos

Medan
Attendance: 15.000

24 February 2002

Thailand	9 – 1	Philippines

Medan
24 February 2002

Cambodia	0 – 0	Thailand

Medan

25 February 2002

Philippines	0 – 6	Indonesia

Medan
Attendance: 15.000
25 February 2002

Laos	2 – 0	Cambodia

Medan

=== Knockout stage ===
- All matches played in Malaysia.

==== Bracket ====
Semi-finals
28 February – Kuala Lumpur
Myanmar	6
Indonesia	0
28 February – Kuala Lumpur
Laos (p)	2 (7)
Malaysia	2 (6)

Final
2 March – Kuala Lumpur
Myanmar	4
Laos	1
Third place
2 March – Kuala Lumpur
Indonesia	1
Malaysia	0

==== Semi-finals ====
28 February 2002

Myanmar	6 – 0	Indonesia

Kuala Lumpur

28 February 2002

Laos	2 – 2 (a.e.t.)	Malaysia
Penalties
	7 – 6

Kuala Lumpur

==== Third place play-off ====
2 March 2002

Malaysia	0 – 1	Indonesia

Kuala Lumpur
Attendance: 50.000

==== Final ====
2 March 2002

Myanmar	4 – 1	Laos

Kuala Lumpur

== Winner ==
2002 AFF U-17 Youth Championship winners

Myanmar
First title

== Notes ==
- Indonesia have protested against their semi-final loss against Myanmar claiming their opponents fielded over-age players.
