= Gelora Joko Samudro Stadium =

Stadium in Gresik Regency, Indonesia

Gelora Joko Samudro
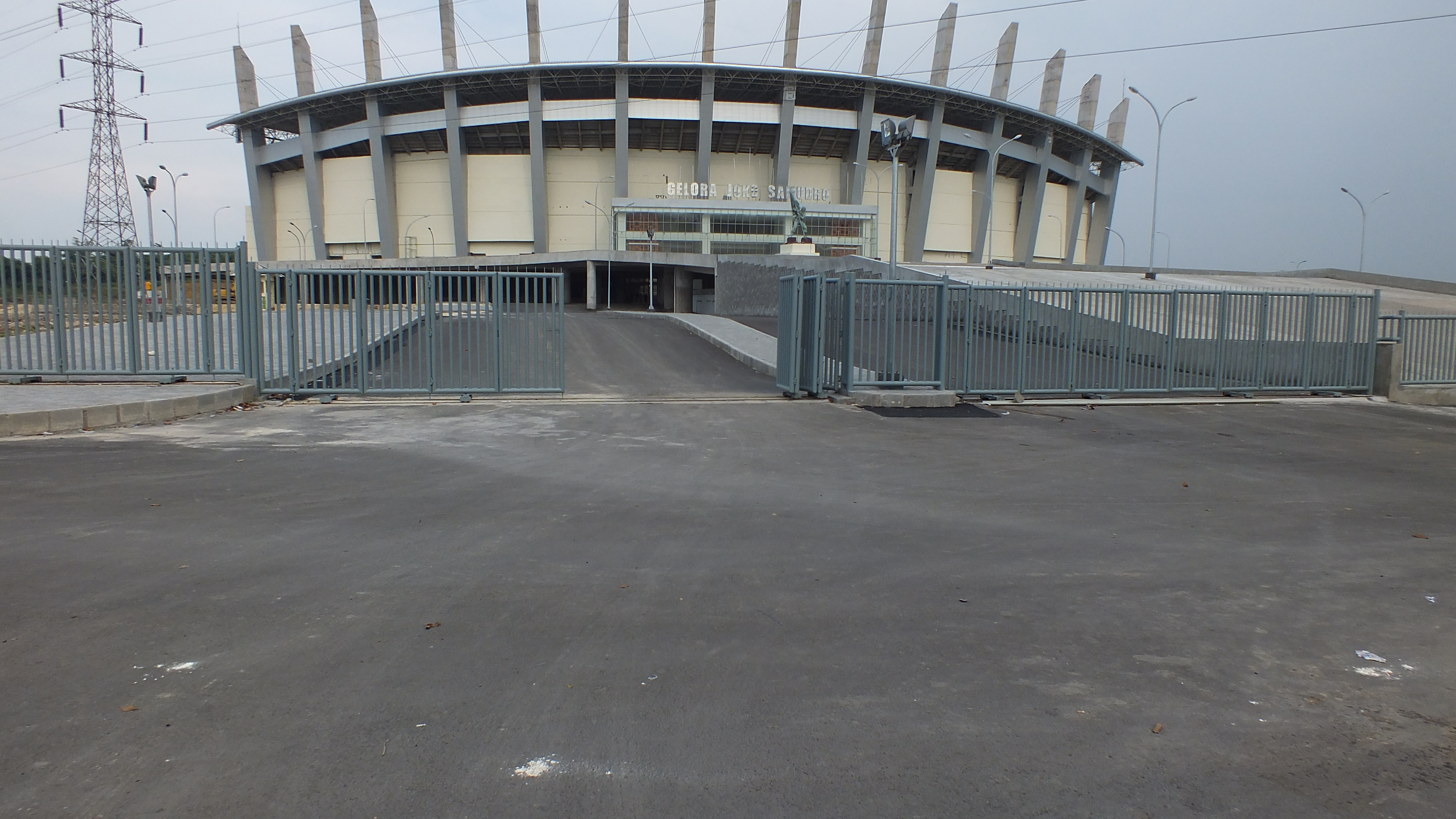
- Frontview

- Location in Greater Surabaya, East Java and Indonesia Gelora Joko Samudro (Java) Gelora Joko Samudro (Indonesia)
- Address: Jl. Veteran, Gending Wetan, Singosari, Kebomas, Gresik Regency, East Java 61123; Indonesia
- Location: Gresik Regency, East Java
- Coordinates: 7°11′7.4″S 112°39′2.7″E
- Owner: Regency Government of Gresik Regency
- Operator: Regency Government of Gresik Regency
- Capacity: 22,272
- Surface: Grass field

Construction
- Opened: 2017

Tenants
- Gresik United; Gresik Putra; Persegres Putra; Madura United (sometimes)

Gelora Joko Samudro is a multi-purpose stadium in the town of Gresik Regency, East Java, Indonesia. It is mostly used for football matches and is the new home stadium of Gresik United. The stadium hold 25,000 spectators.

== Sport events ==
Since its full operation in 2017, the stadium has been selected by PSSI several times to host international championships. Here are some championships that have taken place at Gelora Joko Samudro Stadium.

- 2018 AFF U-19 Youth Championship
- 2018 AFF U-15 Youth Championship
- 2026 ASEAN U-17 Boys' Championship
