= 2018 AFC U-16 Championship squads =

The following is a list of squads for each national team competing at the 2018 AFC U-16 Championship. The tournament took place in Malaysia, between 20 September and 7 October 2018. It was the 18th U-16 age group competition organised by the Asian Football Confederation.

Players born on or after 1 January 2002 were eligible to compete in the tournament. Each team had to register a squad of minimum 18 players and maximum 23 players, minimum three of whom must have been goalkeepers (Regulations Articles 24.1 and 24.2). The full squad listings are below.

== Group A ==
=== Malaysia ===
Malaysia named their squad on 14 September 2018.

Manager: Lim Teong Kim

No.	Pos.	Player	Date of birth (age)	Club
1	GK	Sikh Izhan	23 March 2002 (aged 16)	(Football Association of Malaysia) Mokhtar Dahari Academy
21	GK	Abdul Alim Al-Amri	28 January 2002 (aged 16)	(Football Association of Malaysia) Mokhtar Dahari Academy
22	GK	Syahmi Adib	30 March 2003 (aged 15)	(Football Association of Malaysia) Mokhtar Dahari Academy
3	DF	Firdaus Ramli	10 March 2002 (aged 16)	(Football Association of Malaysia) Mokhtar Dahari Academy
4	DF	Ali Imran Sukari	30 May 2002 (aged 16)	(Football Association of Malaysia) Mokhtar Dahari Academy
5	DF	Hariz Mansor	18 February 2002 (aged 16)	(Football Association of Malaysia) Mokhtar Dahari Academy
12	DF	Raimi Shamsul	28 October 2002 (aged 15)	(Football Association of Malaysia) Mokhtar Dahari Academy
14	DF	Zikri Khalili	25 June 2002 (aged 16)	(Football Association of Malaysia) Mokhtar Dahari Academy
17	DF	Alias Alan	16 October 2002 (aged 15)	(Football Association of Malaysia) Mokhtar Dahari Academy
19	DF	Harith Haiqal	22 June 2002 (aged 16)	(Football Association of Malaysia) Mokhtar Dahari Academy
23	MF	Danish Ishak	26 June 2002 (aged 16)	(Football Association of Malaysia) Mokhtar Dahari Academy
2	MF	Azannis Adzri	6 February 2003 (aged 15)	(Football Association of Malaysia) Mokhtar Dahari Academy
6	MF	Ikhwan Hafizo	30 September 2002 (aged 15)	(Football Association of Malaysia) Mokhtar Dahari Academy
8	MF	Firdaus Kaironnisam	10 December 2002 (aged 15)	(Football Association of Malaysia) Mokhtar Dahari Academy
11	MF	Alif Mutalib	16 January 2002 (aged 16)	(Football Association of Malaysia) Mokhtar Dahari Academy
15	MF	Alif Danial Abdul Aziz	14 May 2002 (aged 16)	(Football Association of Malaysia) Mokhtar Dahari Academy
16	MF	Umar Hakeem	26 August 2002 (aged 16)	(Football Association of Malaysia) Mokhtar Dahari Academy
18	MF	Syukur Fariz	5 January 2003 (aged 15)	(Football Association of Malaysia) Mokhtar Dahari Academy
7	FW	Najmudin Akmal	11 January 2003 (aged 15)	(Football Association of Malaysia) Mokhtar Dahari Academy
9	FW	Amirul Azzim Ruzki	1 April 2002 (aged 16)	(Football Association of Malaysia) Mokhtar Dahari Academy
10	FW	Luqman Hakim	5 March 2002 (aged 16)	(Football Association of Malaysia) Mokhtar Dahari Academy
13	FW	Harith Naem	25 January 2002 (aged 16)	(Football Association of Malaysia) Mokhtar Dahari Academy
20	FW	Danial Amali	10 May 2002 (aged 16)	(Football Association of Malaysia) Mokhtar Dahari Academy

=== Japan ===
Japan named their squad on 3 September 2018.

Manager: Yoshiro Moriyama

No.	Pos.	Player	Date of birth (age)	Club
1	GK	Taiki Yamada	8 January 2002 (aged 16)	(Japan Football Association) Kashima Antlers
12	GK	Masato Sasaki	1 May 2002 (aged 16)	(Japan Football Association) Kashiwa Reysol
23	GK	Taishi Nozawa	25 December 2002 (aged 15)	(Japan Football Association) FC Tokyo
2	DF	Kaito Suzuki	25 August 2002 (aged 16)	(Japan Football Association) Júbilo Iwata
3	DF	Riku Handa	1 January 2002 (aged 16)	(Japan Football Association) Montedio Yamagata
4	DF	Kohshiro Sumi	13 August 2002 (aged 16)	(Japan Football Association) FC Tokyo
5	DF	Yusuke Ishida	11 November 2002 (aged 15)	(Japan Football Association) Ichiritsu Funabashi High School
16	DF	Maaya Sako	2 December 2002 (aged 15)	(Japan Football Association) Tokyo Verdy
17	DF	Nao Yamada	18 November 2002 (aged 15)	(Japan Football Association) Urawa Red Diamonds
21	DF	Shinya Nakano	17 August 2003 (aged 15)	(Japan Football Association) Sagan Tosu
22	DF	Mitsuki Tajima	30 May 2002 (aged 16)	(Japan Football Association) Shimizu S-Pulse
6	MF	Asahi Yokokawa	26 May 2002 (aged 16)	(Japan Football Association) Shonan Bellmare
7	MF	Kakeru Yamauchi	6 January 2002 (aged 16)	(Japan Football Association) Vissel Kobe
8	MF	Hikaru Naruoka	28 July 2002 (aged 16)	(Japan Football Association) Shimizu S-Pulse
9	MF	Keita Nakano	27 August 2002 (aged 16)	(Japan Football Association) Kyoto Sanga
11	MF	Kuraba Kondo	6 July 2002 (aged 16)	(Japan Football Association) Cerezo Osaka
13	MF	Shunsuke Mito	28 September 2002 (aged 15)	(Japan Football Association) JFA Academy Fukushima
14	MF	Keita Ueda	3 September 2002 (aged 16)	(Japan Football Association) Yokohama F. Marinos
15	MF	Ryuma Nakano	6 October 2002 (aged 15)	(Japan Football Association) Kyoto Sanga
10	FW	Jun Nishikawa	21 February 2002 (aged 16)	(Japan Football Association) Toko Gakuen High School
18	FW	Ryotaro Araki	29 January 2002 (aged 16)	(Japan Football Association) Higashi Fukuoka High School
19	FW	Yusuke Aoki	30 August 2002 (aged 16)	(Japan Football Association) FC Tokyo
20	FW	Shoji Toyama	21 September 2002 (aged 15)	(Japan Football Association) Gamba Osaka

=== Thailand ===
Manager: Thongchai Rungreangles

No.	Pos.	Player	Date of birth (age)	Club
1	GK	Anuchid Taweesri	11 March 2002 (aged 16)	(Football Association of Thailand) Chonburi
18	GK	Natthawut Paengkrathok	1 February 2002 (aged 16)	(Football Association of Thailand) Assumption College Thonburi
23	GK	Phuwadol Pholsongkram	11 May 2002 (aged 16)	(Football Association of Thailand) Khon Kaen United
2	DF	Arthit Buangam	27 January 2002 (aged 16)	(Football Association of Thailand) Assumption College Thonburi
3	DF	Chatmongkol Rueangthanarot	9 May 2002 (aged 16)	(Football Association of Thailand) Chonburi
4	DF	Kittichai Yaidee	9 February 2002 (aged 16)	(Football Association of Thailand) Buriram United
5	DF	Jakkapong Sanmahung	6 April 2002 (aged 16)	(Football Association of Thailand) Chonburi
6	DF	Pongsakorn Innet	21 January 2002 (aged 16)	(Football Association of Thailand) Assumption College Thonburi
12	DF	Wongsakorn Thongsuphim	18 January 2003 (aged 15)	(Football Association of Thailand) Bangkok Glass
19	DF	Anuwat Matarat	14 December 2002 (aged 15)	(Football Association of Thailand) Nongphowittaya School
21	DF	Dechanon Srimeaung	11 July 2003 (aged 15)	(Football Association of Thailand) Bangkok Glass
7	MF	Thanarin Thumsen	11 January 2002 (aged 16)	(Football Association of Thailand) Bangkok United
8	MF	Sarawut Soawaros	20 March 2002 (aged 16)	(Football Association of Thailand) Chonburi
13	MF	Thanakrit Laokrai	22 December 2003 (aged 14)	(Football Association of Thailand) Bangkok Glass
14	MF	Punnawat Chotjirachaithorn	1 June 2002 (aged 16)	(Football Association of Thailand) Muangthong United
15	MF	Thanarat Thumsen	11 January 2002 (aged 16)	(Football Association of Thailand) Bangkok United
16	MF	Chitipat Kaeoyos	21 March 2003 (aged 15)	(Football Association of Thailand) PTT Rayong
17	MF	Apidet Janngam	10 March 2002 (aged 16)	(Football Association of Thailand) Buriram United
20	MF	Thanakit Thongsri	31 March 2003 (aged 15)	(Football Association of Thailand) Bangkok Glass
22	MF	Sattawas Leela	17 February 2003 (aged 15)	(Football Association of Thailand) Bangkok Glass
9	FW	Warakorn Thongbai	22 May 2002 (aged 16)	(Football Association of Thailand) Chonburi
10	FW	Suphanat Mueanta	2 August 2002 (aged 16)	(Football Association of Thailand) Buriram United
11	FW	Kittiphong Khetpara	12 June 2002 (aged 16)	(Football Association of Thailand) Chonburi

=== Tajikistan ===
Tajikistan named their squad on 12 September 2018.

Manager: Zaynidin Rakhimov

No.	Pos.	Player	Date of birth (age)	Club
1	GK	Mukhriddin Khasanov	23 September 2002 (aged 15)	(Tajikistan Football Federation) Parvoz
16	GK	Samandar Karimov	12 October 2002 (aged 15)	(Tajikistan Football Federation) Lokomotive Pamir
23	GK	Firuz Nazarov	17 March 2003 (aged 15)	(Tajikistan Football Federation) Orzu–2026
2	DF	Jonibek Sharipov	15 January 2002 (aged 16)	(Tajikistan Football Federation) Lokomotive Pamir
4	DF	Muhammadrasul Litfullaev	9 September 2003 (aged 15)	(Tajikistan Football Federation) Lokomotive Pamir
5	DF	Shahrom Nazarov	21 May 2002 (aged 16)	(Tajikistan Football Federation) Lokomotive Pamir
11	DF	Shohrukh Sangov	31 October 2002 (aged 15)	(Tajikistan Football Federation) Lokomotive Pamir
12	DF	Mehrobjon Azimov	20 March 2002 (aged 16)	(Tajikistan Football Federation) Lokomotive Pamir
15	DF	Muhammadali Azizboev	4 January 2003 (aged 15)	(Tajikistan Football Federation) Istaravshan
22	DF	Isroil Kholov	27 September 2002 (aged 15)	(Tajikistan Football Federation) Lokomotive Pamir
6	MF	Khamzadzhon Akhtamov	29 May 2003 (aged 15)	(Tajikistan Football Federation) Lokomotive Pamir
7	MF	Emomali Ahmadkhon	4 May 2002 (aged 16)	(Tajikistan Football Federation) Lokomotive Pamir
8	MF	Nidoyor Zabirov	1 July 2002 (aged 16)	(Tajikistan Football Federation) Lokomotive Pamir
14	MF	Sharifbek Rahmatov	1 September 2002 (aged 16)	(Tajikistan Football Federation) Lokomotive Pamir
17	MF	Umedjon Kholikov	21 February 2002 (aged 16)	(Tajikistan Football Federation) Lokomotive Pamir
18	MF	Azizbek Khasanov	2 March 2002 (aged 16)	(Tajikistan Football Federation) Lokomotive Pamir
20	MF	Ozodbek Panzhiev	12 October 2002 (aged 15)	(Tajikistan Football Federation) Lokomotive Pamir
21	MF	Sunatullo Ismoilov	28 April 2002 (aged 16)	(Tajikistan Football Federation) Vaksh Khatlon
3	FW	Parviz Khodzhiev	19 February 2003 (aged 15)	(Tajikistan Football Federation) Lokomotive Pamir
9	FW	Rustam Soirov	12 September 2002 (aged 16)	(Tajikistan Football Federation) Lokomotive Pamir
10	FW	Islom Zairov	12 January 2002 (aged 16)	(Tajikistan Football Federation) Lokomotive Pamir
13	FW	Amadoni Kamolov	16 January 2003 (aged 15)	(Tajikistan Football Federation) Lokomotive Pamir
19	FW	Ibrokhim Zakirov	16 November 2003 (aged 14)	(Tajikistan Football Federation) Regar-TadAZ

== Group B ==
=== North Korea ===
Manager: Pak Jong-chol

No.	Pos.	Player	Date of birth (age)	Club
1	GK	Yu Yong-bom	17 February 2002 (aged 16)	(DPR Korea Football Association) Pyongyang
2	DF	Kim Jin-hyok	25 March 2002 (aged 16)	(DPR Korea Football Association) South Hamgyong
3	DF	Kim Ju-hyok	1 October 2002 (aged 15)	(DPR Korea Football Association) Pyongyang
4	DF	Kim Jin-guk	18 September 2002 (aged 16)	(DPR Korea Football Association) Pyongyang
5	DF	Pak Ryong-gwon	11 May 2002 (aged 16)	(DPR Korea Football Association) Pyongyang
6	DF	Chae Yu-song	15 November 2002 (aged 15)	(DPR Korea Football Association) Pyongyang
7	MF	Pak Kyong-song	18 February 2002 (aged 16)	(DPR Korea Football Association) South Pyongan
8	MF	Kim Won-il	24 March 2002 (aged 16)	(DPR Korea Football Association) South Hamgyong
9	MF	Ra Nam-hyon	2 March 2002 (aged 16)	(DPR Korea Football Association) North Hwanghae
10	FW	Ri Jo-guk	9 May 2002 (aged 16)	(DPR Korea Football Association) Pyongyang
11	MF	Kim Kang-song	17 April 2002 (aged 16)	(DPR Korea Football Association) Pyongyang
12	DF	Ri Ryong-ju	17 June 2002 (aged 16)	(DPR Korea Football Association) Pyongyang
13	DF	Song Hyok	24 February 2003 (aged 15)	(DPR Korea Football Association) Pyongyang
14	MF	Won Hyok	20 February 2003 (aged 15)	(DPR Korea Football Association) Pyongyang
15	DF	Ri Hun	14 October 2002 (aged 15)	(DPR Korea Football Association) Pyongyang
16	MF	Ko Chang-ung	3 February 2002 (aged 16)	(DPR Korea Football Association) Pyongyang
17	MF	Kim To-myong	8 August 2002 (aged 16)	(DPR Korea Football Association) Pyongyang
18	GK	Kim Ryong-ik	13 March 2003 (aged 15)	(DPR Korea Football Association) Pyongyang
19	FW	An Phyong-il	2 November 2002 (aged 15)	(DPR Korea Football Association) South Pyongan
20	FW	Ri Yong-gwang	28 February 2002 (aged 16)	(DPR Korea Football Association) Pyongyang
21	GK	Ri Kyong-won	2 December 2002 (aged 15)	(DPR Korea Football Association) North Hwanghae

=== Oman ===
Oman named their squad on 6 September 2018.

Manager: Yaqoob Al-Sabahi

No.	Pos.	Player	Date of birth (age)	Club
1	GK	Mitham Al-Ajmi	22 May 2002 (aged 16)	(Oman Football Association) Al-Ittihad
12	GK	Rashad Al-Habsi	11 January 2002 (aged 16)	(Oman Football Association) Al-Nasr
22	GK	Abdalla Al-Alawi	2 February 2003 (aged 15)	(Oman Football Association) Yanqul
2	DF	Issa Al-Naabi	20 March 2002 (aged 16)	(Oman Football Association) Muscat
3	DF	Fahad Al-Rasbi	16 March 2002 (aged 16)	(Oman Football Association) Al-Kamil Al-Wafi
4	DF	Muayad Al-Subhi	17 November 2002 (aged 15)	(Oman Football Association) Al-Shabab
8	DF	Hamed Al-Mukhaini	15 March 2002 (aged 16)	(Oman Football Association) Al-Orouba
15	DF	Mohammed Al-Balushi	10 January 2002 (aged 16)	(Oman Football Association) Al-Suwaiq
19	DF	Tariq Al-Mashary	18 May 2002 (aged 16)	(Oman Football Association) Jalan
23	DF	Mulham Al-Sinaidi	15 March 2002 (aged 16)	(Oman Football Association) Ahli Sidab
5	MF	Ali Al-Dhahri	2 March 2002 (aged 16)	(Oman Football Association) Sohar
6	MF	Dawood Al-Jabri	4 June 2002 (aged 16)	(Oman Football Association) Samail
13	MF	Abdullah Al-Flaiti	15 November 2002 (aged 15)	(Oman Football Association) Al-Shabab
16	MF	Abdul Hakim Al-Uwaisi	15 January 2002 (aged 16)	(Oman Football Association) Al-Shabab
17	MF	Wail Al-Harthy	30 June 2002 (aged 16)	(Oman Football Association) Al-Suwaiq
18	MF	Hussein Al-Shahri	26 December 2002 (aged 15)	(Oman Football Association) Dhofar
20	MF	Mohammed Al-Madailwi	8 March 2003 (aged 15)	(Oman Football Association) Sur
21	MF	Harib Al-Adawi	13 June 2002 (aged 16)	(Oman Football Association) Al-Seeb
7	FW	Osama Al-Hadabi	10 September 2002 (aged 16)	(Oman Football Association) Al-Seeb
9	FW	Qusai Al-Jaradi	24 February 2003 (aged 15)	(Oman Football Association) Al-Seeb
10	FW	Al Azhar Al-Balushi	15 November 2002 (aged 15)	(Oman Football Association) Al-Shabab
11	FW	Omar Al-Salti	17 February 2002 (aged 16)	(Oman Football Association) Al-Orouba
14	FW	Nasser Al-Naabi	21 March 2002 (aged 16)	(Oman Football Association) Al-Shabab

=== Yemen ===
Yemen named their squad on 20 September 2018.

Manager: (Egypt) Magdy Shalaby

No.	Pos.	Player	Date of birth (age)	Club
1	GK	Abdullah Al-Sadi	23 April 2002 (aged 16)	(Yemen Football Association)
2	MF	Mohammed Al-Murisi	2 January 2003 (aged 15)	(Yemen Football Association)
3	DF	Azzam Al-Asadi	2 May 2003 (aged 15)	(Yemen Football Association) Shaab Ibb
4	DF	Hamzah Sabah	12 February 2002 (aged 16)	(Yemen Football Association) Al-Wehda
5	DF	Akram Mohammed	3 March 2002 (aged 16)	(Yemen Football Association)
6	MF	Khaled Awdali	6 October 2002 (aged 15)	(Yemen Football Association)
7	MF	Tamer Senan	2 May 2002 (aged 16)	(Yemen Football Association)
8	MF	Ahmed Zaid	11 February 2004 (aged 14)	(Yemen Football Association)
9	FW	Hamdan bin Awn	1 October 2002 (aged 15)	(Yemen Football Association)
10	FW	Sadeq Al-Galal	12 February 2002 (aged 16)	(Yemen Football Association)
11	MF	Faisal Saif	1 March 2002 (aged 16)	(Yemen Football Association)
12	MF	Osamah Al-Baadani	26 January 2002 (aged 16)	(Yemen Football Association) Shaab Ibb
13	FW	Abdulrahman Ali	1 August 2002 (aged 16)	(Yemen Football Association)
14	MF	Arafat Hagar	6 October 2003 (aged 14)	(Yemen Football Association)
15	DF	Abdulrahman Al-Ashwal	10 October 2003 (aged 14)	(Yemen Football Association)
16	DF	Mohanad Al-Garash	2 April 2003 (aged 15)	(Yemen Football Association)
17	MF	Saad Al-Qaaod	23 February 2002 (aged 16)	(Yemen Football Association)
18	MF	Hamid Al-Dhubri	1 January 2002 (aged 16)	(Yemen Football Association)
19	DF	Abdulkareem Al-Noobah	12 May 2002 (aged 16)	(Yemen Football Association)
20	DF	Saif Fadhl Ali	21 September 2002 (aged 15)	(Yemen Football Association)
21	DF	Hasan Ayash	1 January 2003 (aged 15)	(Yemen Football Association) Al-Hilal Al-Sahili
22	GK	Abdulrahman Al-Raimi	18 February 2003 (aged 15)	(Yemen Football Association)
23	GK	Mohammed Al-Dubai	2 July 2004 (aged 14)	(Yemen Football Association) Al-Wehda

=== Jordan ===
Jordan named their squad on 8 September 2018.

Manager: Abdallah El Qutati

No.	Pos.	Player	Date of birth (age)	Club
1	GK	Osama Al-Kawamleh	16 August 2002 (aged 16)	(Jordan Football Association) Al-Jalil
2	DF	Mohammad Khaldoon	17 May 2002 (aged 16)	(Jordan Football Association) Shabab Al-Ordon
3	DF	Fayez Lutfy	28 February 2002 (aged 16)	(Jordan Football Association) Dar Al-Dawaa
4	DF	Mohammad Hussein	26 January 2002 (aged 16)	(Jordan Football Association) Al-Wehdat
5	DF	Mohammad Bani Yaseen	5 September 2002 (aged 16)	(Jordan Football Association) Al-Arabi
6	MF	Mohammad Issa	15 February 2002 (aged 16)	(Jordan Football Association) Dar Al-Dawaa
7	FW	Rashed Al-Hanahneh	14 January 2002 (aged 16)	(Jordan Football Association) Al-Ahli
8	MF	Thaer Khaleel	5 April 2002 (aged 16)	(Jordan Football Association) Al-Wehdat
9	DF	Amer Jamous	3 July 2002 (aged 16)	(Jordan Football Association) Al-Jazeera
10	MF	Reziq Banihani	28 January 2002 (aged 16)	(Jordan Football Association) Dar Al-Dawaa
11	FW	Mohannad Semreen	8 January 2002 (aged 16)	(Jordan Football Association) Al-Wehdat
12	GK	Yamen Al-Mahmoud	16 March 2002 (aged 16)	(Jordan Football Association) Al-Hussein
13	MF	Amin Al-Shanaineh	7 April 2003 (aged 15)	(Jordan Football Association) Al-Faisaly
14	FW	Obada Al-Ruzi	16 May 2002 (aged 16)	(Jordan Football Association) Al-Faisaly
15	MF	Jaber Khalaf	24 January 2003 (aged 15)	
16	DF	Majd Al-Zaied	25 January 2002 (aged 16)	(Jordan Football Association) Al-Arabi
17	MF	Ahmad Al-Aqrabawi	29 April 2002 (aged 16)	(Jordan Football Association) Shabab Al-Ordon
18	MF	Amro Mousa	8 September 2002 (aged 16)	(Jordan Football Association) Al-Faisaly
19	FW	Sharif Babli	23 October 2002 (aged 15)	
20	DF	Othman El-Bashabsheh	19 May 2002 (aged 16)	(Jordan Football Association) Al-Ramtha
21	DF	Adel Al-Masri	15 April 2002 (aged 16)	(Jordan Football Association) Al-Faisaly
22	GK	Abdelrahman Al-Shelleh	26 May 2004 (aged 14)	(Jordan Football Association) Al-Faisaly
23	FW	Ahmad Al-Zghoul	8 January 2002 (aged 16)	(Jordan Football Association) Al-Arabi

== Group C ==
=== Iran ===
Iran named their squad on 9 September 2018.

Manager: Abbas Chamanyan

No.	Pos.	Player	Date of birth (age)	Club
1	GK	Amirhossein Nikpour	25 February 2002 (aged 16)	(Football Federation Islamic Republic of Iran) Sepahan
12	GK	Payam Parsa	21 June 2002 (aged 16)	(Football Federation Islamic Republic of Iran) Sanat Naft Abadan
22	GK	Mohammadreza Bagheri	27 January 2002 (aged 16)	(Football Federation Islamic Republic of Iran) Paykan
2	DF	Amirhossein Azizi	28 October 2002 (aged 15)	(Football Federation Islamic Republic of Iran) Paykan
3	DF	Amin Hazbavi	6 May 2003 (aged 15)	(Football Federation Islamic Republic of Iran) Foolad
4	DF	Pouria Teymori	4 February 2002 (aged 16)	(Football Federation Islamic Republic of Iran) Saipa
5	DF	Hossein Shaverdi	18 April 2002 (aged 16)	(Football Federation Islamic Republic of Iran) Foolad
6	DF	Amir Shabani	19 October 2002 (aged 15)	(Football Federation Islamic Republic of Iran) Pars Ozhan Taban
14	DF	Amirhossein Amnzadeh	19 January 2002 (aged 16)	(Football Federation Islamic Republic of Iran) Moghavemat Tehran
16	DF	Amirreza Eslamtalab	30 January 2003 (aged 15)	(Football Federation Islamic Republic of Iran) KIA Football Academy
21	DF	Farzan Malekinezhad	18 February 2003 (aged 15)	(Football Federation Islamic Republic of Iran) Aboumoslem
7	MF	Alireza Bavieh	21 August 2002 (aged 16)	(Football Federation Islamic Republic of Iran) Foolad
8	MF	Mohammadreza Shakibkhoo	9 January 2002 (aged 16)	(Football Federation Islamic Republic of Iran) Shahin Bushehr
9	MF	Mahdi Seyedi	31 March 2002 (aged 16)	(Football Federation Islamic Republic of Iran) Shahrdari Ardabil
10	MF	Yasin Salmani	27 February 2002 (aged 16)	(Football Federation Islamic Republic of Iran) Sepahan
13	MF	Alireza Khodabakhshi	30 January 2002 (aged 16)	(Football Federation Islamic Republic of Iran) Saipa
17	MF	Amir Jafari	18 January 2002 (aged 16)	(Football Federation Islamic Republic of Iran) Paykan
20	MF	Abolfazl Alizadeh	16 June 2002 (aged 16)	(Football Federation Islamic Republic of Iran) Saipa
23	MF	Seyed Hosseini	13 December 2002 (aged 15)	(Football Federation Islamic Republic of Iran) Vahdat Qom
11	FW	Hossein Hajizadeh	9 March 2003 (aged 15)	(Football Federation Islamic Republic of Iran) KIA Football Academy
15	FW	Hamidreza Sharifi	5 April 2004 (aged 14)	(Football Federation Islamic Republic of Iran) Foolad
18	FW	Aria Barzegar	10 October 2002 (aged 15)	(Football Federation Islamic Republic of Iran) KIA Football Academy
19	FW	Amin Doustali	31 January 2004 (aged 14)	(Football Federation Islamic Republic of Iran) KIA Football Academy

=== Vietnam ===
Vietnam named their squad on 17 September 2018.

Manager: Vũ Hồng Việt

No.	Pos.	Player	Date of birth (age)	Club
1	GK	Nguyễn Duy Dũng	1 May 2002 (aged 16)	(Vietnam Football Federation) Hà Nội
22	GK	Nguyễn Văn Việt	12 July 2002 (aged 16)	(Vietnam Football Federation) Sông Lam Nghệ An
23	GK	Trần Lâm Hào	28 October 2002 (aged 15)	(Vietnam Football Federation) PVF
2	DF	Nguyễn Hồng Phúc	31 May 2003 (aged 15)	(Vietnam Football Federation) Viettel
3	DF	Võ Quốc Dân	10 January 2002 (aged 16)	(Vietnam Football Federation) PVF
4	DF	Giáp Tuấn Dương	7 September 2002 (aged 16)	(Vietnam Football Federation) Công An Nhân Dân
5	DF	Vũ Tiến Long	4 April 2002 (aged 16)	(Vietnam Football Federation) Hà Nội
14	DF	Phạm Văn Đạt	20 April 2002 (aged 16)	(Vietnam Football Federation) Viettel
17	DF	Trần Thanh Tú	13 March 2002 (aged 16)	(Vietnam Football Federation) Becamex Bình Dương
18	DF	Đặng Tuấn Phong	7 February 2003 (aged 15)	(Vietnam Football Federation) Viettel
21	DF	Trịnh Quang Trường	2 February 2002 (aged 16)	(Vietnam Football Federation) PVF
6	MF	Nguyễn Văn Tú	17 January 2003 (aged 15)	(Vietnam Football Federation) Viettel
8	MF	Ngô Đức Hoàng	16 September 2002 (aged 16)	(Vietnam Football Federation) Hà Nội
9	MF	Nguyễn Thế Hưng	2 February 2002 (aged 16)	(Vietnam Football Federation) PVF
10	MF	Khuất Văn Khang	11 May 2003 (aged 15)	(Vietnam Football Federation) Viettel
11	MF	Nguyễn Quốc Hoàng	25 January 2002 (aged 16)	(Vietnam Football Federation) PVF
12	MF	Đinh Thành Trung	19 June 2002 (aged 16)	(Vietnam Football Federation) Viettel
15	MF	Ngô Thành Tài	28 November 2002 (aged 15)	(Vietnam Football Federation) Hà Nội
20	MF	Tạ Việt Sơn	21 February 2003 (aged 15)	(Vietnam Football Federation) Viettel
7	FW	Trịnh Minh Khôi	30 April 2003 (aged 15)	(Vietnam Football Federation) Viettel
16	FW	Đậu Ngọc Thành	2 January 2002 (aged 16)	(Vietnam Football Federation) Hà Nội
19	FW	Hà Trung Hậu	3 October 2002 (aged 15)	(Vietnam Football Federation) Becamex Bình Dương

=== India ===
Manager: Bibiano Fernandes

No.	Pos.	Player	Date of birth (age)	Club
1	GK	Lalbiakhlua Jongte	23 July 2002 (aged 16)	(All India Football Federation) AIFF Regional Academy
2	DF	Thoiba Singh Moirangthem	12 December 2002 (aged 15)	(All India Football Federation) Minerva Punjab
3	DF	Harpreet Singh	1 November 2002 (aged 15)	(All India Football Federation) Ozone
4	DF	Shabas Ahammed Moothedath	1 January 2002 (aged 16)	(All India Football Federation) AIFF Regional Academy
5	DF	Gurkirat Singh	16 July 2003 (aged 15)	(All India Football Federation) AIFF Regional Academy
6	FW	Vikram Pratap Singh	16 January 2002 (aged 16)	(All India Football Federation) Minerva Punjab
7	MF	Ravi Bahadur Rana	15 October 2002 (aged 15)	(All India Football Federation) AIFF Regional Academy
8	FW	Bekey Oram	23 December 2003 (aged 14)	(All India Football Federation) Bengaluru FC
9	FW	Ridge Demello	18 February 2002 (aged 16)	(All India Football Federation) AIFF Regional Academy
10	MF	Lalchhanhima Sailo	3 March 2003 (aged 15)	(All India Football Federation) Minerva Punjab
11	MF	Givson Singh	5 June 2002 (aged 16)	(All India Football Federation) AIFF Regional Academy
12	MF	Bhuvnesh Shendre	12 November 2002 (aged 15)	(All India Football Federation) DSK Shivajians
13	FW	Harpreet Rulbir	11 March 2002 (aged 16)	(All India Football Federation) Ozone
14	MF	Ricky Shabong	29 December 2002 (aged 15)	(All India Football Federation) Royal Wahingdoh
15	FW	Shanon Veigas	7 January 2002 (aged 16)	(All India Football Federation) Sporting Goa
18	FW	Reuben Letkhotinchon	9 October 2002 (aged 15)	(All India Football Federation) Delhi Dynamos
16	DF	Bikash Yumnam	6 September 2003 (aged 15)	(All India Football Federation) Minerva Punjab
17	MF	Eric Rempuatpuia Chhangte	14 March 2002 (aged 16)	(All India Football Federation) Shillong Lajong
19	DF	Samir Kerketta	7 November 2002 (aged 15)	(All India Football Federation) AIFF Regional Academy
20	GK	Vignesh Anand	10 November 2004 (aged 14)	(All India Football Federation) NEROCA
21	DF	Lalrokima	24 March 2003 (aged 15)	(All India Football Federation) Bengaluru FC
22	DF	Manish Chaudhary	25 October 2003 (aged 14)	(All India Football Federation) Bengaluru FC
23	GK	Niraj Kumar	16 November 2002 (aged 15)	(All India Football Federation) Ozone

=== Indonesia ===
Indonesia named their squad on 30 August 2018.

Manager: Fachry Husaini

No.	Pos.	Player	Date of birth (age)	Club
1	GK	Ahludz Dzikri	16 February 2002 (aged 16)	(Football Association of Indonesia) ASAD 313 Jaya Perkasa
21	GK	Ernando Ari	27 February 2002 (aged 16)	(Football Association of Indonesia) Persebaya Surabaya
23	GK	Risky Sudirman	2 February 2002 (aged 16)	(Football Association of Indonesia) Villa 2000
2	DF	Bagas Kaffa	16 January 2002 (aged 16)	(Football Association of Indonesia) Chelsea Soccer School Indonesia
3	DF	Yudha Febrian	13 February 2002 (aged 16)	(Football Association of Indonesia) Cibinong Raya
5	DF	Fadillah Nur Rahman	10 February 2002 (aged 16)	(Football Association of Indonesia) PPLP Sumatera Barat
13	DF	Cecep Mulyana	30 September 2002 (aged 15)	(Football Association of Indonesia) ASAD 313 Jaya Perkasa
14	DF	Reza Fauzan	20 May 2002 (aged 16)	(Football Association of Indonesia) Patriot Aceh
15	DF	Salman Alfarid	16 April 2002 (aged 16)	(Football Association of Indonesia) Diklat Ragunan
16	DF	Uchida Sudirman	25 March 2003 (aged 15)	(Football Association of Indonesia) Patriot 165
22	DF	Fatah Aji	27 April 2002 (aged 16)	(Football Association of Indonesia) PPLP DKI Jakarta
4	MF	Komang Teguh	28 April 2002 (aged 16)	(Football Association of Indonesia) Diklat Ragunan
6	MF	David Maulana	25 February 2002 (aged 16)	(Football Association of Indonesia) PPLP Medan
8	MF	Andre Oktaviansyah	23 October 2002 (aged 15)	(Football Association of Indonesia) Madura United
10	MF	Rendy Juliansyah	27 June 2002 (aged 16)	(Football Association of Indonesia) ASIOP Apacinti
18	MF	Brylian Aldama	23 February 2002 (aged 16)	(Football Association of Indonesia) Deltras
19	MF	Muhammad Talaohu	12 April 2002 (aged 16)	(Football Association of Indonesia) ASAD 313 Jaya Perkasa
7	FW	Amanar Abdillah	30 June 2002 (aged 16)	(Football Association of Indonesia) PS TIRA
9	FW	Sutan Zico	7 April 2002 (aged 16)	(Football Association of Indonesia) Chelsea Soccer School Indonesia
11	FW	Mochammad Supriadi	23 May 2002 (aged 16)	(Football Association of Indonesia) Diklat Ragunan
12	FW	Subhan Fajri	13 May 2003 (aged 15)	(Football Association of Indonesia) Posila Lhokseumawe
17	FW	Hamsa Lestaluhu	6 June 2002 (aged 16)	(Football Association of Indonesia) ASAD 313 Jaya Perkasa
20	FW	Bagus Kahfi	16 January 2002 (aged 16)	(Football Association of Indonesia) Chelsea Soccer School Indonesia

== Group D ==
=== Iraq ===
Iraq named their squad on 18 September 2018.

Manager: Faisal Aziz

No.	Pos.	Player	Date of birth (age)	Club
1	GK	Hasan Hadi	30 July 2002 (aged 16)	(Iraq Football Association) Al-Talaba
2	DF	Mustafa Najm	20 November 2003 (aged 14)	(Iraq Football Association)
3	DF	Murtadha Mohammed	20 April 2003 (aged 15)	(Iraq Football Association)
4	DF	Hussein Jasim	1 May 2003 (aged 15)	(Iraq Football Association)
5	DF	Baqer Talib	4 February 2004 (aged 14)	(Iraq Football Association)
6	MF	Hussein Khalid	7 January 2002 (aged 16)	(Iraq Football Association)
7	MF	Abdullah Zeyad	12 November 2002 (aged 15)	(Iraq Football Association)
8	MF	Abdul-Razaq Qasim	19 February 2003 (aged 15)	(Iraq Football Association) Al-Karkh
9	FW	Hasem Mohammed	1 October 2002 (aged 15)	(Iraq Football Association)
10	FW	Hasan Majeed	1 January 2002 (aged 16)	(Iraq Football Association)
11	MF	Ali Hikmat	23 October 2002 (aged 15)	(Iraq Football Association)
12	GK	Ahmed Khasib	1 March 2002 (aged 16)	(Iraq Football Association)
13	DF	Hayder Kadhim	28 January 2003 (aged 15)	(Iraq Football Association)
14	FW	Hussein Sadeq	2 October 2003 (aged 14)	(Iraq Football Association) Al-Shorta
15	DF	Hussein Saad	1 February 2003 (aged 15)	(Iraq Football Association)
16	MF	Ali Johni	19 March 2003 (aged 15)	(Iraq Football Association)
17	MF	Ali Jasim	20 January 2004 (aged 14)	(Iraq Football Association) Al-Karkh
18	MF	Yaseen Akram	8 December 2002 (aged 15)	(Iraq Football Association)
19	MF	Ameer Mohammed	11 January 2003 (aged 15)	(Iraq Football Association)
20	MF	Ameer Hasan	28 July 2003 (aged 15)	(Iraq Football Association)
21	MF	Murtadha Fareed	15 January 2003 (aged 15)	(Iraq Football Association)
22	GK	Osamah Imad	6 February 2003 (aged 15)	(Iraq Football Association)

=== South Korea ===
South Korea named their squad on 13 September 2018.

Manager: Kim Jung-soo

No.	Pos.	Player	Date of birth (age)	Club
1	GK	Shin Song-hoon	7 November 2002 (aged 15)	(Korea Football Association) Gwangju FC
21	GK	Kim Gi-hun	14 November 2002 (aged 15)	(Korea Football Association) Suwon Samsung Bluewings
23	GK	Lee Seung-hwan	5 April 2003 (aged 15)	(Korea Football Association) Pohang Steelers
2	DF	Lee Tae-seok	28 July 2002 (aged 16)	(Korea Football Association) FC Seoul
3	DF	Son Ho-jun	3 July 2002 (aged 16)	(Korea Football Association) Suwon Samsung Bluewings
4	DF	Lee Jun-suk	9 March 2002 (aged 16)	(Korea Football Association) Shingal High School
5	DF	Hong Sung-wook	17 September 2002 (aged 16)	(Korea Football Association) BooGyeong High School
12	DF	Kim Ryun-seong	4 June 2002 (aged 16)	(Korea Football Association) Pohang Steelers
13	DF	Kwak Yong-chan	18 July 2003 (aged 15)	(Korea Football Association) Daegu FC
15	DF	Bang Woo-jin	27 February 2002 (aged 16)	(Korea Football Association) FC Seoul
16	DF	Youn Jin-seo	10 July 2002 (aged 16)	(Korea Football Association) Jeonbuk Hyundai
6	MF	Yoon Suk-ju	25 February 2002 (aged 16)	(Korea Football Association) Pohang Steelers
7	MF	Jo Jin-ho	10 July 2003 (aged 15)	(Korea Football Association) Jeonbuk Hyundai
8	MF	Paik Sang-hoon	7 January 2002 (aged 16)	(Korea Football Association) FC Seoul
10	MF	Hong Yun-sang	19 March 2002 (aged 16)	(Korea Football Association) Pohang Steelers
14	MF	Seo Jae-min	16 September 2003 (aged 15)	(Korea Football Association) FC Seoul
17	MF	Kang Young-suk	5 May 2002 (aged 16)	(Korea Football Association) Jeonbuk Hyundai
18	MF	Kim Dong-hyeon	12 October 2002 (aged 15)	(Korea Football Association) Suwon Samsung Bluewings
19	MF	Ahn Gi-hun	1 January 2002 (aged 16)	(Korea Football Association) FC Seoul
22	MF	Cheon Se-yoon	6 November 2002 (aged 15)	(Korea Football Association) Suwon Samsung Bluewings
9	FW	Choi Min-seo	5 March 2002 (aged 16)	(Korea Football Association) Pohang Steelers
11	FW	Jeong Sang-bin	1 April 2002 (aged 16)	(Korea Football Association) Suwon Samsung Bluewings
20	FW	Moon Jun-ho	21 January 2003 (aged 15)	(Korea Football Association) Daejeon Citizen

=== Australia ===
Australia named their squad on 6 September 2018.

Manager: Trevor Morgan

No.	Pos.	Player	Date of birth (age)	Club
1	GK	Ahmad Taleb	4 December 2002 (aged 15)	(Football Australia) Melbourne City
12	GK	Adam Pavlešić	30 July 2002 (aged 16)	(Football Australia) Sydney FC
18	GK	Oliver Kalac	9 November 2002 (aged 15)	(Football Australia) Western Sydney Wanderers
2	DF	Jaiden Kucharski	25 June 2002 (aged 16)	(Football Australia) Sydney FC
3	DF	Daniel Walsh	15 October 2002 (aged 15)	(Football Australia) Perth Glory
4	DF	Tim Boke	21 January 2003 (aged 15)	(Football Australia) Belconnen United
5	DF	Jordan Bos	29 October 2002 (aged 15)	(Football Australia) Melbourne City
13	DF	Kerrin Stokes	11 December 2002 (aged 15)	(Football Australia) Croydon Kings
14	DF	Alexandar Popovic	7 September 2002 (aged 16)	(Football Australia) Adelaide United
15	DF	Jordan Courtney-Perkins	6 November 2002 (aged 15)	(Football Australia) Brisbane Roar
6	MF	Ryan Teague	24 January 2002 (aged 16)	(Football Australia) Sydney FC
8	MF	Birkan Kirdar	7 February 2002 (aged 16)	(Football Australia) Melbourne Victory
10	MF	Luke Duzel	5 February 2002 (aged 16)	(Football Australia) Melbourne City
11	MF	Joshua Varga	7 February 2002 (aged 16)	(Football Australia) Melbourne City
16	MF	Adam Leombruno	25 August 2003 (aged 15)	(Football Australia) FFSA NTC
17	MF	Lachlan Sepping	28 May 2002 (aged 16)	(Football Australia) Marconi Stallions
20	MF	Adam Zervas	28 September 2003 (aged 14)	(Football Australia) Newcastle Jets
23	MF	Thomas Lambiris	8 February 2003 (aged 15)	(Football Australia) Melbourne City
7	FW	Tristan Hammond	5 January 2003 (aged 15)	(Portuguese Football Federation) Sporting CP
9	FW	Noah Botić	11 January 2002 (aged 16)	(Football Australia) Rockdale City Suns
19	FW	Jayden Gorman	25 January 2003 (aged 15)	(Football Australia) Perth Glory
21	FW	Joseph Roddy	9 May 2003 (aged 15)	(Football Australia) Sydney FC
22	FW	Josh Benson	29 March 2003 (aged 15)	(Football Australia) Newcastle Jets

=== Afghanistan ===
Manager: Sayed Hadi Kazemi

No.	Pos.	Player	Date of birth (age)	Club
1	GK	Sharif Aminzada	6 December 2002 (aged 15)	(Afghanistan Football Federation)
2	DF	Sajad Ali Khalili	5 September 2002 (aged 16)	(Afghanistan Football Federation)
3	DF	Abdul Munir Hazrati	6 August 2003 (aged 15)	(Afghanistan Football Federation)
4	DF	Mohammad Amin Nezami	23 September 2002 (aged 15)	(Afghanistan Football Federation)
5	DF	Esmatullah Kazimi	6 March 2003 (aged 15)	(Afghanistan Football Federation)
6	DF	Mahdi Ibrahimi	29 October 2004 (aged 13)	(Afghanistan Football Federation)
7	MF	Faizuddin Shirzad	9 January 2003 (aged 15)	(Afghanistan Football Federation)
8	MF	Mohammad Haroon Naseri	6 September 2002 (aged 16)	(Afghanistan Football Federation)
9	FW	Edris Zamani	5 October 2003 (aged 14)	(Afghanistan Football Federation)
10	MF	Samir Samandari	5 November 2002 (aged 15)	(Afghanistan Football Federation) De Spin Ghar Bazan
11	FW	Abozar Rahmani	15 October 2002 (aged 15)	(Afghanistan Football Federation)
12	FW	Ramin Amiri	4 February 2004 (aged 14)	(Afghanistan Football Federation)
13	MF	Ali Zahidi	29 March 2004 (aged 14)	(Afghanistan Football Federation)
14	MF	Ali Sina Walizada	16 November 2002 (aged 15)	(Afghanistan Football Federation)
16	MF	Mohammad Nasir Rezaie	10 October 2002 (aged 15)	(Afghanistan Football Federation)
17	FW	Ahmad Zakaria Hussaini	25 September 2003 (aged 14)	(Afghanistan Football Federation)
18	FW	Parwiz Mohammadi	2 July 2003 (aged 15)	(Afghanistan Football Federation)
19	DF	Ibrahim Dawood	13 August 2003 (aged 15)	(Afghanistan Football Federation)
20	MF	Hasibullah Ahadi	21 March 2003 (aged 15)	(Afghanistan Football Federation)
22	GK	Ahmad Mashal Musaferzada	20 October 2002 (aged 15)	(Afghanistan Football Federation)
23	GK	Hadi Alizada	6 September 2002 (aged 16)	(Afghanistan Football Federation)
