= 2018 AFC U-16 Championship qualification =

Tournament details
- Host countries: Saudi Arabia (Group A); Tajikistan (Group B); Iran (Group C); Nepal (Group D); Qatar (Group E); Chinese Taipei (Group F); Thailand (Group G); Myanmar (Group H); Mongolia (Group I); Indonesia (Group J)
- Dates: 16–29 September 2017
- Teams: 45 (from 1 confederation)
- Venue: 10 (in 10 host cities)

Tournament statistics
- Matches played: 73
- Goals scored: 391 (5.36 per match)
- Attendance: 20,369 (279 per match)
- Top scorer: (Indonesia) Sutan Zico (10 goals)

The 2018 AFC U-16 Championship qualification was an international men's under-16 football competition which decides the participating teams of the 2018 AFC U-16 Championship.

A total of 16 teams qualified to play in the final tournament, including Malaysia who qualified automatically as hosts.

== Draw ==
Of the 47 AFC member associations, a total of 45 teams entered the competition. The final tournament hosts Malaysia also entered in qualification despite having automatically qualified for the final tournament (they had not been confirmed as hosts at the time of the qualification draw).

The draw was held on 21 April 2017, 15:00 MYT (UTC+8), at the AFC House in Kuala Lumpur, Malaysia. The 45 teams were drawn into ten groups: five groups of five teams and five groups of four teams. For the draw, teams were divided into two zones:

- West: 23 teams from West Asia, Central Asia and South Asia, to be drawn into five groups: three groups of five teams and two groups of four teams (Groups A–E).
- East: 22 teams from ASEAN and East Asia, to be drawn into five groups: two groups of five teams and three groups of four teams (Groups F–J).

The teams were seeded in each zone according to their performance in the 2016 AFC U-16 Championship final tournament and qualification (overall ranking shown in parentheses; NR stands for non-ranked teams). The following restrictions were also applied:

- The seven teams which indicated their intention to serve as qualification group hosts prior to the draw were drawn into separate groups.

	Pot 1	Pot 2	Pot 3	Pot 4	Pot 5
West Zone	1. **Iraq** (1); 2. **Iran** (2) **(H)**; 3. **Oman** (5); 4. United Arab Emirates (6) **(W)**; 5. Uzbekistan (7)	6. Kyrgyzstan (10); 7. Saudi Arabia (11) **(H)**; 8. **Yemen** (12); 9. **India** (13); 10. **Tajikistan** (17) **(H)**	11. Syria (20); 12. **Jordan** (22); 13. **Afghanistan** (23); 14. Qatar (25) **(H)**; 15. Palestine (28)	16. Bangladesh (30); 17. Bahrain (31); 18. Lebanon (33); 19. Nepal (34) **(H)**; 20. Turkmenistan (36) **(W)**	21. Maldives (37); 22. Bhutan (NR); 23. Sri Lanka (NR)
East Zone	1. **North Korea** (3); 2. **Japan** (4); 3. **Vietnam** (8); 4. **South Korea** (9); 5. **Thailand** (14) **(H)**	6. **Malaysia** (15) **(Q)**; 7. **Australia** (16); 8. China (18); 9. Hong Kong (19); 10. Laos (21)	11. Timor-Leste (24); 12. Myanmar (26) **(H)***; 13. Chinese Taipei (27) **(H)***; 14. Singapore (29); 15. Mongolia (32) **(H)**	16. Cambodia (35); 17. Philippines (38); 18. Macau (39); 19. Guam (40); 20. Northern Mariana Islands (41)	21. Brunei (NR); 22. **Indonesia** (NR)

Notes

- Teams in **bold** qualified for the final tournament.
- (H): Qualification group hosts (* Chinese Taipei and Myanmar chosen as group hosts after the draw, remaining group hosted at neutral venue)
- (Q): Final tournament hosts, automatically qualified regardless of qualification results
- (W): Withdrew after draw

Did not enter
West Zone	Kuwait (suspended); Pakistan
East Zone	None

== Player eligibility ==
Players born on or after 1 January 2002 are eligible to compete in the tournament.

== Format ==
In each group, teams play each other once at a centralised venue. The ten group winners and the five best runners-up qualify for the final tournament. If the final tournament hosts Malaysia win their group or are among the five best runners-up, the sixth best runner-up also qualifies for the final tournament.

=== Tiebreakers ===
Teams are ranked according to points (3 points for a win, 1 point for a draw, 0 points for a loss), and if tied on points, the following tiebreaking criteria are applied, in the order given, to determine the rankings (Regulations Article 9.3):

1. Points in head-to-head matches among tied teams;
2. Goal difference in head-to-head matches among tied teams;
3. Goals scored in head-to-head matches among tied teams;
4. If more than two teams are tied, and after applying all head-to-head criteria above, a subset of teams are still tied, all head-to-head criteria above are reapplied exclusively to this subset of teams;
5. Goal difference in all group matches;
6. Goals scored in all group matches;
7. Penalty shoot-out if only two teams are tied and they met in the last round of the group;
8. Disciplinary points (yellow card = 1 point, red card as a result of two yellow cards = 3 points, direct red card = 3 points, yellow card followed by direct red card = 4 points);
9. Drawing of lots.

== Groups ==
The matches were played between 16 and 29 September 2017.

Schedule
Matchday	Groups A, C & F–G		Groups B, D–E & H–J		
Matchday	Dates	Matches	Dates		Matches
Matchday	Dates	Matches	Groups B, D–E & I–J	Group H	Matches
Matchday 1	16 September 2017	3 v 2, 5 v 4	20 September 2017	25 September 2017	1 v 4, 2 v 3
Matchday 2	18 September 2017	4 v 1, 5 v 3	22 September 2017	27 September 2017	4 v 2, 3 v 1
Matchday 3	20 September 2017	1 v 5, 2 v 4	24 September 2017	29 September 2017	1 v 2, 3 v 4
Matchday 4	22 September 2017	2 v 5, 3 v 1	—		
Matchday 5	24 September 2017	4 v 3, 1 v 2	—		

=== Group A ===
- All matches were held in Saudi Arabia.
- Times listed are UTC+3.

Pos	Team	Pld	W	D	L	GF	GA	GD	Pts	Qualification
1	Jordan	4	3	1	0	12	3	+9	10	Final tournament
2	Saudi Arabia (H)	4	3	0	1	15	2	+13	9	
3	Uzbekistan	4	2	1	1	7	1	+6	7	
4	Bahrain	4	1	0	3	8	7	+1	3	
5	Sri Lanka	4	0	0	4	0	29	−29	0	

Source: AFC
Rules for classification: Qualification tiebreakers
(H) Hosts
16 September 2017
16:00

Sri Lanka	0–6	Bahrain
	Report	Al-Asfoor 1', 66'; Alawi 36', 40'; Sayed 56' (pen.), 85' (pen.)

Prince Turki bin Abdulaziz Stadium, Riyadh
Attendance: 200
Referee: Khurram Shahzad (Pakistan)
16 September 2017
20:15

Jordan	2–1	Saudi Arabia
Bani Hani 35'; Semreen 38'	Report	Al-Ali 74'

Prince Turki bin Abdulaziz Stadium, Riyadh
Attendance: 200
Referee: Omar Al-Yaqoubi (Oman)

18 September 2017
16:00

Bahrain	0–1	Uzbekistan
	Report	Kosimov 89'

Prince Turki bin Abdulaziz Stadium, Riyadh
Attendance: 50
Referee: Suhaizi Bin Shukri (Malaysia)
18 September 2017
20:15

Sri Lanka	0–7	Jordan
	Report	Semreen 18', 44'; Jamous 53'; Al-Ruzi 54', 71'; Khaleel 60'; Al-Zghoul 80'

Prince Turki bin Abdulaziz Stadium, Riyadh
Attendance: 230
Referee: Çarymyrat Kurbanow (Turkmenistan)

20 September 2017
16:00

Uzbekistan	6–0	Sri Lanka
Jaloliddinov 4' (pen.), 6'; Mamasidikov 50', 90'; Sabirov 70'; Roziev 79'	Report

Prince Turki bin Abdulaziz Stadium, Riyadh
Attendance: 50
Referee: Çarymyrat Kurbanow (Turkmenistan)
20 September 2017
20:15

Saudi Arabia	3–0	Bahrain
Al-Mashhari 33'; Al-Ali 36' (pen.); Kaabi 51'	Report

Prince Turki bin Abdulaziz Stadium, Riyadh
Attendance: 100
Referee: Adel Al-Naqbi (United Arab Emirates)

22 September 2017
16:00

Jordan	0–0	Uzbekistan
	Report

Prince Turki bin Abdulaziz Stadium, Riyadh
Attendance: 200
Referee: Adel Al-Naqbi (United Arab Emirates)
22 September 2017
20:15

Saudi Arabia	10–0	Sri Lanka
Qarradi 20', 64'; Al-Ali 23', 45+2'; Al-Mashhari 27'; Al-Arfaj 34'; Thanujan 35' (o.g.); Hassan 47'; Al-Beshi 55'; Whaeshi 73'	Report

Prince Turki bin Abdulaziz Stadium, Riyadh
Attendance: 250
Referee: Suhaizi Bin Shukri (Malaysia)

24 September 2017
16:00

Bahrain	2–3	Jordan
Alawi 18', 70'	Report	Bani Hani 8'; Semreen 36', 39'

Prince Turki bin Abdulaziz Stadium, Riyadh
Attendance: 150
Referee: Omar Al-Yaqoubi (Oman)
24 September 2017
20:15

Uzbekistan	0–1	Saudi Arabia
	Report	Al-Ali 79'

Prince Turki bin Abdulaziz Stadium, Riyadh
Attendance: 300
Referee: Çarymyrat Kurbanow (Turkmenistan)

=== Group B ===
- All matches were held in Tajikistan.
- Times listed are UTC+5.

Pos	Team	Pld	W	D	L	GF	GA	GD	Pts	Qualification
1	Tajikistan (H)	3	3	0	0	17	0	+17	9	Final tournament
2	Oman	3	2	0	1	14	1	+13	6	Final tournament
3	Syria	3	1	0	2	6	8	−2	3	
4	Maldives	3	0	0	3	0	28	−28	0	
5	Turkmenistan	0	0	0	0	0	0	0	0	Withdrew

Source: AFC
Rules for classification: Qualification tiebreakers
(H) Hosts
20 September 2017
16:00

Oman	8–0	Maldives
I. Al-Naabi 8'; Al-Sinaidi 25', 61'; Al-Rasbi 43'; Al-Salti 45'; N. Al-Naabi 64', 72'; Al-Mashary 88'	Report

Hisor Central Stadium, Hisor
Attendance: 100
Referee: Mooud Bonyadifar (Iran)
20 September 2017
19:00

Tajikistan	2–0	Syria
Emomali 69'; Zairov 76'	Report

Hisor Central Stadium, Hisor
Attendance: 1,210
Referee: Sivakorn Pu-udom (Thailand)

22 September 2017
16:00

Syria	0–6	Oman
	Report	A. Al-Balushi 66'; Al-Salti 67'; Al-Mashary 71'; Al-Rasbi 75'; Al-Hadabi 80'; Al-Jaradi 82'

Hisor Central Stadium, Hisor
Attendance: 100
Referee: Kim Hee-gon (South Korea)
22 September 2017
19:00

Maldives	0–14	Tajikistan
	Report	Sangov 24'; Rahmatov 29' (pen.), 90+4'; Emomali 35', 45+3', 56'; Zairov 45+1', 45+2'; Soirov 65' (pen.), 79', 87', 89'; Ibrahim 71' (o.g.); Khasanov 85'

Hisor Central Stadium, Hisor
Attendance: 1,200
Referee: Hamad Yousef Al-Ali (United Arab Emirates)

24 September 2017
16:00

Syria	6–0	Maldives
Naghnugh 7'; Maatouk 14'; Abo Karsh 33'; Al-Khatib 46'; Hatem 58'; Amara 90+4' (pen.)	Report

Hisor Central Stadium, Hisor
Attendance: 100
Referee: Mooud Bonyadifar (Iran)
24 September 2017
19:00

Oman	0–1	Tajikistan
	Report	Kholov 76'

Hisor Central Stadium, Hisor
Attendance: 2,300
Referee: Kim Hee-gon (South Korea)

=== Group C ===
- All matches were held in Iran.
- Times listed are UTC+4:30 on 16–20 September, UTC+3:30 on 22–24 September 2017.

Pos	Team	Pld	W	D	L	GF	GA	GD	Pts	Qualification
1	Iran (H)	4	4	0	0	15	1	+14	12	Final tournament
2	Afghanistan	4	3	0	1	11	4	+7	9	Final tournament
3	Kyrgyzstan	4	1	1	2	3	8	−5	4	
4	Lebanon	4	1	0	3	3	8	−5	3	
5	Bhutan	4	0	1	3	1	12	−11	1	

Source: AFC
Rules for classification: Qualification tiebreakers
(H) Hosts
16 September 2017
14:00

Afghanistan	3–1	Kyrgyzstan
Walizada 40'; Rashidi 74'; Mirzada 90+4'	Report	Rysbekov 90'

Enghelab Stadium, Karaj
Attendance: 120
Referee: Ahmed Al-Ali (Jordan)
16 September 2017
17:00

Bhutan	0–2	Lebanon
	Report	Zgheib 55'; Hadchity 60' (pen.)

Enghelab Stadium, Karaj
Attendance: 170
Referee: Takuto Okabe (Japan)

18 September 2017
14:00

Bhutan	0–3	Afghanistan
	Report	Zahidi 3', 89'; Ashgar 45+2'

Enghelab Stadium, Karaj
Attendance: 210
Referee: Võ Minh Trí (Vietnam)
18 September 2017
17:00

Lebanon	0–3	Iran
	Report	Shaverdi 23'; Azizi 24'; Seyedi 81'

Enghelab Stadium, Karaj
Attendance: 350
Referee: Sherzod Kasimov (Uzbekistan)

20 September 2017
14:00

Kyrgyzstan	1–0	Lebanon
Shipovskii 16'	Report

Enghelab Stadium, Karaj
Attendance: 67
Referee: C. R. Srikrishna (India)
20 September 2017
17:00

Iran	6–0	Bhutan
Bavieh 12', 42'; Shariat 54', 67', 90+1'; Rezaei 90'	Report

Enghelab Stadium, Karaj
Attendance: 350
Referee: Ahmed Al-Ali (Jordan)

22 September 2017
14:00

Kyrgyzstan	1–1	Bhutan
Shipovskii 50'	Report	Jigmi 53'

Enghelab Stadium, Karaj
Attendance: 200
Referee: Võ Minh Trí (Vietnam)
22 September 2017
17:00

Afghanistan	1–2	Iran
Nezami 90+2' (pen.)	Report	Seyedi 28'; Jafari 70'

Enghelab Stadium, Karaj
Attendance: 3,105
Referee: Takuto Okabe (Japan)

24 September 2017
14:00

Lebanon	1–4	Afghanistan
Ayach 68' (pen.)	Report	Samandari 46'; Rashidi 53', 82'; Walizada 87'

Enghelab Stadium, Karaj
Attendance: 475
Referee: Sherzod Kasimov (Uzbekistan)
24 September 2017
17:00

Iran	4–0	Kyrgyzstan
Jafari 16', 77'; Rezaei 26'; Bavieh 72'	Report

Enghelab Stadium, Karaj
Attendance: 300
Referee: Ahmed Al-Ali (Jordan)

=== Group D ===
- All matches were held in Nepal.
- Times listed are UTC+5:45.

Pos	Team	Pld	W	D	L	GF	GA	GD	Pts	Qualification
1	Iraq	3	2	1	0	5	0	+5	7	Final tournament
2	India	3	1	2	0	5	2	+3	5	Final tournament
3	Palestine	3	1	0	2	2	8	−6	3	
4	Nepal (H)	3	0	1	2	3	5	−2	1	

Source: AFC
Rules for classification: Qualification tiebreakers
(H) Hosts
20 September 2017
12:00

India	3–0	Palestine
G. Moirangthem 53'; Oram 74'; V. Singh 82'	Report

Halchowk Stadium, Kathmandu
Attendance: 50
Referee: Pechsri Mongkolchai (Thailand)
20 September 2017
15:30

Iraq	1–0	Nepal
Mandalawi 69'	Report

Halchowk Stadium, Kathmandu
Attendance: 251
Referee: Dmitrii Mashentsev (Kyrgyzstan)

22 September 2017
12:00

Palestine	0–4	Iraq
	Report	Shanan 50'; Al-Hilfi 67'; Qasim 72'; Hameed 89'

Halchowk Stadium, Kathmandu
Attendance: 52
Referee: Yaqoub Al-Hammadi (United Arab Emirates)
22 September 2017
15:30

Nepal	2–2	India
Chaudhary 76', 88'	Report	Rulbir 83', 85'

Halchowk Stadium, Kathmandu
Attendance: 200
Referee: Kasun Lakmal Weerakkody Karage (Sri Lanka)

24 September 2017
12:00

Iraq	0–0	India
	Report

Halchowk Stadium, Kathmandu
Attendance: 100
Referee: Dmitrii Mashentsev (Kyrgyzstan)
24 September 2017
15:30

Palestine	2–1	Nepal
Wridat 28', 75'	Report	Chaudhary 10' (pen.)

Halchowk Stadium, Kathmandu
Attendance: 198
Referee: Yaqoub Al-Hammadi (United Arab Emirates)

=== Group E ===
- All matches were held in Qatar.
- Times listed are UTC+3.

Pos	Team	Pld	W	D	L	GF	GA	GD	Pts	Qualification
1	Yemen	2	2	0	0	8	1	+7	6	Final tournament
2	Bangladesh	2	1	0	1	2	2	0	3	
3	Qatar (H)	2	0	0	2	1	8	−7	0	
4	United Arab Emirates	0	0	0	0	0	0	0	0	Withdrew

Source: AFC
Rules for classification: Qualification tiebreakers
(H) Hosts
20 September 2017
19:45

Yemen	6–1	Qatar
Al-Baadani 18', 86'; Thabit 27' (pen.); Senan 67'; Al-Baleet 82'; Sabah 90+3'	Report	Al-Zarra 7'

Grand Hamad Stadium, Doha
Attendance: 306
Referee: Hussein Abo Yehia (Lebanon)

22 September 2017
16:45

Bangladesh	0–2	Yemen
	Report	Thabit 45+4' (pen.); Al-Baadani 90+3'

Grand Hamad Stadium, Doha
Attendance: 230
Referee: Nazmi Nasaruddin (Malaysia)

24 September 2017
19:45

Qatar	0–2	Bangladesh
	Report	Dipok 70'; Fahim 81'

Grand Hamad Stadium, Doha
Attendance: 196
Referee: Timur Faizullin (Kyrgyzstan)

=== Group F ===
- All matches were held in Chinese Taipei.
- Times listed are UTC+8.

Pos	Team	Pld	W	D	L	GF	GA	GD	Pts	Qualification
1	North Korea	4	4	0	0	28	0	+28	12	Final tournament
2	Hong Kong	4	2	0	2	8	4	+4	6 (Note: Head-to-head results: Chinese Taipei 0–2 Hong Kong, Brunei 1–2 Chinese Taipei, Hong Kong 1–2 Brunei. Head-to-head standings: Hong Kong: 3 pts, +1 GD; Brunei: 3 pts, 0 GD; Chinese Taipei: 3 pts, −1 GD)	
3	Brunei	4	2	0	2	7	12	−5	6	
4	Chinese Taipei (H)	4	2	0	2	5	10	−5	6	
5	Macau	4	0	0	4	0	22	−22	0	

Source: AFC
Rules for classification: Qualification tiebreakers
(H) Hosts
Notes:
16 September 2017
15:00

Brunei	4–0	Macau
Aiman 26'; Raziq 37'; Yazid 67' (pen.); Shahrol 85'	Report

Fu Jen Catholic University Stadium, New Taipei
Attendance: 100
Referee: Omar Mohamed Al-Ali (United Arab Emirates)
16 September 2017
19:00

Chinese Taipei	0–2	Hong Kong
	Report	Tong Connor 55'; Wong Yat 56'

Fu Jen Catholic University Stadium, New Taipei
Attendance: 450
Referee: Masoud Tufayelieh (Syria)

18 September 2017
15:00

Macau	0–10	North Korea
	Report	Kim Jin-guk 14'; Ri Jo-guk 27', 58', 67'; Xiao Rongrui 43' (o.g.); Won Hyok 51'; Ra Nam-hyon 60', 70', 83'; Ri Yong-gwang 76'

Fu Jen Catholic University Stadium, New Taipei
Attendance: 60
Referee: Ali Reda (Lebanon)
18 September 2017
19:00

Brunei	1–2	Chinese Taipei
Abdul 11'	Report	Lin Chun-kai 85'; Yang Sheng-kai 90+3'

Fu Jen Catholic University Stadium, New Taipei
Attendance: 200
Referee: Ahmad Yacoub Ibrahim (Jordan)

20 September 2017
15:00

North Korea	9–0	Brunei
Ri Hun 6'; Kim Kang-song 12', 45+1'; Kim Won-il 13', 32', 60'; Ra Nam-hyon 22'; Kim Jin-hyok 42'; Ko Chang-ung 49'	Report

Fu Jen Catholic University Stadium, New Taipei
Attendance: 100
Referee: Masoud Tufayelieh (Syria)
20 September 2017
19:00

Hong Kong	5–0	Macau
Snelder 7', 40'; Chan Shinichi 25', 54'; Lau Ka Kiu 89'	Report

Fu Jen Catholic University Stadium, New Taipei
Attendance: 20
Referee: Khamsing Sayavongsy (Laos)

22 September 2017
15:00

Hong Kong	1–2	Brunei
Tung Siu Hang 38' (pen.)	Report	Aminuddin 60', 89'

Fu Jen Catholic University Stadium, New Taipei
Attendance: 40
Referee: Omar Mohamed Ahmed Hassan Al Ali (United Arab Emirates)
22 September 2017
19:00

Chinese Taipei	0–7	North Korea
	Report	Kim Kang-song 7', 27', 52'; An Phyong-il 8', 64'; Kim Jin-hyok 58'; Won Hyok 86'

Fu Jen Catholic University Stadium, New Taipei
Attendance: 300
Referee: Ali Reda (Lebanon)

24 September 2017
15:00

North Korea	2–0	Hong Kong
Song Hyok 38'; Kim Jin-hyok 90'	Report

Fu Jen Catholic University Stadium, New Taipei
Attendance: 100
Referee: Khamsing Sayavongsy (Laos)
24 September 2017
19:00

Macau	0–3	Chinese Taipei
	Report	Yang Sheng-kai 28'; Lin Chun-kai 43'; Liang Meng-hsin 56'

Fu Jen Catholic University Stadium, New Taipei
Attendance: 300
Referee: Ahmad Yacoub Ibrahim (Jordan)

=== Group G ===
- All matches were held in Thailand.
- Times listed are UTC+7.

Pos	Team	Pld	W	D	L	GF	GA	GD	Pts	Qualification
1	Indonesia	4	4	0	0	25	1	+24	12	Final tournament
2	Thailand (H)	4	3	0	1	18	2	+16	9	Final tournament
3	Timor-Leste	4	2	0	2	17	10	+7	6	
4	Laos	4	1	0	3	13	12	+1	3	
5	Northern Mariana Islands	4	0	0	4	1	49	−48	0	

Source: AFC
Rules for classification: Qualification tiebreakers
(H) Hosts
16 September 2017
16:00

Timor-Leste	5–2	Laos
Mouzinho 3'; Conceição 16', 42'; Gali 60'; Elias 68'	Report	Ackhavong 45+2'; Conceição 82' (o.g.)

Rajamangala Stadium, Bangkok
Attendance: 64
Referee: Jameel Abdulhusin (Bahrain)
16 September 2017
19:00

Indonesia	18–0	Northern Mariana Islands
Supriadi 9', 46', 90'; Bagus 13', 25', 42'; Rendy 14', 21'; Zico 49', 63', 65', 67', 82'; Amanar 69'; Lestaluhu 70', 72', 88'; Andre 90+2'	Report

Rajamangala Stadium, Bangkok
Attendance: 52
Referee: Bijan Heidari (Iran)

18 September 2017
16:00

Indonesia	3–1	Timor-Leste
Zico 61', 64', 89'	Report	Gali 19'

Rajamangala Stadium, Bangkok
Attendance: 76
Referee: Shaun Evans (Australia)
18 September 2017
19:00

Northern Mariana Islands	0–10	Thailand
	Report	Punnawat 30'; Jakkapong 40'; Arthit 45'; Nattakit 47', 90'; Warakorn 53', 55'; Thakdanai 58'; Thanarin 62', 86'

Rajamangala Stadium, Bangkok
Attendance: 204
Referee: Shukri Al-Hunfush (Saudi Arabia)

20 September 2017
16:00

Laos	10–0	Northern Mariana Islands
Chanthamaly 3'; Wenpaserth 5', 18', 42', 44', 71'; Ackhavong 76'; Thongsanith 86' (pen.); Keopheth 88'; Keomanyvong 90+1'	Report

Rajamangala Stadium, Bangkok
Attendance: 70
Referee: Jameel Abdulhusin (Bahrain)
20 September 2017
19:00

Thailand	0–1	Indonesia
	Report	Amanar 20'

Rajamangala Stadium, Bangkok
Attendance: 350
Referee: Mohammad Arafah (Jordan)

22 September 2017
16:00

Laos	0–3	Indonesia
	Report	Zico 25', 59'; Rendy 90+4' (pen.)

Rajamangala Stadium, Bangkok
Attendance: 63
Referee: Shaun Evans (Australia)
22 September 2017
19:00

Timor-Leste	0–4	Thailand
	Report	Warakorn 43', 58'; Nattakit 53'; Thanarin 81'

Rajamangala Stadium, Bangkok
Attendance: 283
Referee: Bijan Heidari (Iran)

24 September 2017
16:00

Northern Mariana Islands	1–11	Timor-Leste
Maniago 70'	Report	Mouzinho 8', 32', 85'; Ejivanio 13'; Gali 52', 54'; Brito 56', 59'; Frith 68', 78'; Mendez 81' (o.g.)

Rajamangala Stadium, Bangkok
Attendance: 60
Referee: Shukri Al-Hunfush (Saudi Arabia)
24 September 2017
19:00

Thailand	4–1	Laos
Punnawat 12'; Thanarin 58' (pen.), 90+2'; Vannalath 85' (o.g.)	Report	Wenpaserth 78'

Rajamangala Stadium, Bangkok
Attendance: 337
Referee: Mohammad Arafah (Jordan)

=== Group H ===
- All matches were held in Myanmar.
- Times listed are UTC+6:30.

Pos	Team	Pld	W	D	L	GF	GA	GD	Pts	Qualification
1	South Korea	3	3	0	0	13	0	+13	9	Final tournament
2	China	3	2	0	1	4	2	+2	6	
3	Myanmar (H)	3	1	0	2	6	6	0	3	
4	Philippines	3	0	0	3	0	15	−15	0	

Source: AFC
Rules for classification: Qualification tiebreakers
(H) Hosts
25 September 2017
15:00

South Korea	8–0	Philippines
Kim Dong-hyeon 11'; Lee Tae-seok 27'; Paik Sang-hoon 65'; Park Se-jun 67', 74'; Jeong Sang-bin 73', 85', 89'	Report

Thuwunna Stadium, Yangon
Attendance: 116
Referee: Ammar Mahfoodh (Bahrain)
25 September 2017
18:00

China	2–1	Myanmar
Abulimiti 57'; Asqer 77'	Report	Shwe Ko 87'

Thuwunna Stadium, Yangon
Attendance: 333
Referee: Mohammed Al-Hoish (Saudi Arabia)

27 September 2017
15:00

Philippines	0–2	China
	Report	Zhang Xingliang 39'; Pan Yusheng 90'

Thuwunna Stadium, Yangon
Attendance: 143
Referee: Khalid Al-Shaqsi (Oman)
27 September 2017
18:00

Myanmar	0–4	South Korea
	Report	Yoon Suk-ju 16'; Lee Jun-suk 39'; Jeong Sang-bin 57'; Hong Yun-sang 82' (pen.)

Thuwunna Stadium, Yangon
Attendance: 286
Referee: Payam Heidari (Iran)

29 September 2017
15:00

South Korea	1–0	China
Choi Min-seo 61' (pen.)	Report

Thuwunna Stadium, Yangon
Attendance: 84
Referee: Payam Heidari (Iran)
29 September 2017
18:00

Myanmar	5–0	Philippines
Kaung Khant Kyaw 11'; Zaw Win Thein 34'; Yan Naing Lin 37'; Ye Htet Aung 59'; Pyae Phyo Aung 81'	Report

Thuwunna Stadium, Yangon
Attendance: 124
Referee: Ammar Mahfoodh (Bahrain)

=== Group I ===
- All matches were held in Mongolia.
- Times listed are UTC+8.

Pos	Team	Pld	W	D	L	GF	GA	GD	Pts	Qualification
1	Australia	3	3	0	0	18	2	+16	9	Final tournament
2	Vietnam	3	2	0	1	15	5	+10	6	Final tournament
3	Cambodia	3	1	0	2	5	12	−7	3	
4	Mongolia (H)	3	0	0	3	3	22	−19	0	

Source: AFC
Rules for classification: Qualification tiebreakers
(H) Hosts
20 September 2017
12:00

Vietnam	5–2	Cambodia
Nguyễn Quốc Hoàng 9'; Võ Nguyên Hoàng 56'; Hà Trung Hậu 68'; Nguyễn Thế Hùng 79'; Đoàn Chí Bảo 85'	Report	Ky Rina 13'; Ly Mael 74'

MFF Football Centre, Ulaanbaatar
Attendance: 96
Referee: Kim Dae-yong (South Korea)
20 September 2017
16:00

Australia	10–1	Mongolia
Savas 8', 27', 34', 42', 50'; Hammond 30'; Peupion 66'; Botic 67'; Kucharski 79'; Kirdar 83'	Report	Erdene-Ochir 33'

MFF Football Centre, Ulaanbaatar
Attendance: 465
Referee: Hasan Akrami (Iran)

22 September 2017
12:00

Cambodia	0–5	Australia
	Report	Kirdar 73' (pen.), 90'; Savas 83'; Botic 86' (pen.); Peupion 90+3'

MFF Football Centre, Ulaanbaatar
Attendance: 46
Referee: Pranjal Banerjee (India)
22 September 2017
16:00

Mongolia	0–9	Vietnam
	Report	Võ Nguyên Hoàng 13'; Đinh Thanh Trung 24' (pen.); Đoàn Chí Bảo 50', 61', 65', 88'; Võ Minh Đan 53'; Nguyễn Quốc Hoàng 58'; Hà Trung Hậu 76'

MFF Football Centre, Ulaanbaatar
Attendance: 375
Referee: Ahmad A'Qashah (Singapore)

24 September 2017
12:00

Vietnam	1–3	Australia
Đậu Ngọc Thành 80'	Report	Savas 63'; Teague 72'; Hammond 79' (pen.)

MFF Football Centre, Ulaanbaatar
Attendance: 182
Referee: Hasan Akrami (Iran)
24 September 2017
16:00

Mongolia	2–3	Cambodia
Erdenetsogt 24', 52'	Report	Ky Rina 7'; Met Samel 18'; Bunthoeun Bunnarong 34'

MFF Football Centre, Ulaanbaatar
Attendance: 250
Referee: Kim Dae-yong (South Korea)

=== Group J ===
- All matches were held in Indonesia (neutral venue host).
- Times listed are UTC+7.

Pos	Team	Pld	W	D	L	GF	GA	GD	Pts	Qualification
1	Japan	3	3	0	0	35	0	+35	9	Final tournament
2	Malaysia (Note: Malaysia, as final tournament hosts, automatically qualified regardless of qualification results.)	3	2	0	1	20	6	+14	6	Final tournament
3	Singapore	3	1	0	2	10	18	−8	3	
4	Guam	3	0	0	3	2	43	−41	0	

Source: AFC
Rules for classification: Qualification tiebreakers
Notes:
20 September 2017
16:00

Japan	20–0	Guam
K. Nakano 5', 19', 38', 54' (pen.), 64' (pen.), 73'; Yoshida 10', 32', 51', 62'; Yokokawa 14'; Niu 28' (o.g.); Sumi 60'; Sako 66'; Aoshima 75'; Aoki 80', 87'; Kondo 83', 86'; S. Nakano 90'	Report

Wibawa Mukti Stadium, Cikarang
Attendance: 150
Referee: Mahmood Salim Said Al-Majarafi (Oman)
20 September 2017
19:00

Malaysia	6–1	Singapore
Luqman 5', 17'; Harith H. 11'; Amirul 29'; Zikri 55'; Firdaus 68'	Report	Tan 23'

Wibawa Mukti Stadium, Cikarang
Attendance: 280
Referee: Saoud Al-Athbah (Qatar)

22 September 2017
16:00

Guam	1–14	Malaysia
Halehale 84'	Report	Ikhwan 11'; Aiman 15' (pen.), 49', 87'; Aleff 23'; Faiz 30' (pen.); Alif 45+1', 51'; Harith N. 48'; Danish 59', 81'; Danial 67', 77'; Umar 72'

Wibawa Mukti Stadium, Cikarang
Attendance: 120
Referee: Chen Hsin-chuan (Chinese Taipei)
22 September 2017
19:00

Singapore	0–11	Japan
	Report	Araki 7', 78'; Koshio 24'; Aoki 38', 49', 62'; Naruoka 39'; Kondo 41'; Nishikawa 48'; Aoshima 74'; K. Nakano 80' (pen.)

Wibawa Mukti Stadium, Cikarang
Attendance: 150
Referee: Hanna Hattab (Syria)

24 September 2017
16:00

Japan	4–0	Malaysia
Yoshida 23'; Ueda 27'; K. Nakano 49'; Aoki 73'	Report

Wibawa Mukti Stadium, Cikarang
Attendance: 150
Referee: Mahmood Salim Said Al-Majarafi (Oman)
24 September 2017
19:00

Singapore	9–1	Guam
Tan 3', 20', 45+1', 56'; Chua 57', 80'; Niu 63' (o.g.); Rahmat 77'; Zulkifli 85'	Report	Halehale 90+2' (pen.)

Wibawa Mukti Stadium, Cikarang
Attendance: 120
Referee: Chen Hsin-chuan (Chinese Taipei)

== Ranking of second-placed teams ==
Due to groups having different number of teams and the withdrawal of United Arab Emirates from Group E, the results against the fifth and fourth-placed teams in five and four-team groups are not considered for this ranking.

Pos	Grp	Team	Pld	W	D	L	GF	GA	GD	Pts	Qualification
1	D	India	2	1	1	0	3	0	+3	4	Final tournament
2	B	Oman	2	1	0	1	6	1	+5	3	Final tournament
3	G	Thailand	2	1	0	1	4	1	+3	3	Final tournament
4	J	Malaysia	2	1	0	1	6	5	+1	3 (Note: Ranked by disciplinary points (Malaysia: –2 pts; Vietnam: –10 pts).)	Final tournament
5	I	Vietnam	2	1	0	1	6	5	+1	3	Final tournament
6	C	Afghanistan	2	1	0	1	4	3	+1	3	Final tournament
7	A	Saudi Arabia	2	1	0	1	2	2	0	3 (Note: Ranked by disciplinary points (Saudi Arabia: –4 pts; Bangladesh: –4 pts; China PR: –5 pts).)	
8	E	Bangladesh	2	1	0	1	2	2	0	3	
9	H	China	2	1	0	1	2	2	0	3	
10	F	Hong Kong	2	0	0	2	1	4	−3	0	

Source: AFC
Rules for classification: 1) points; 2) goal difference; 3) goals scored; 4) disciplinary points; 5) drawing of lots.

== Qualified teams ==
The following 16 teams qualified for the final tournament.

Team	Qualified as	Qualified on	Previous appearances in AFC U-16 Championship^{1}
Malaysia	Hosts	25 July 2017	4 (2004, 2008, 2014, 2016)
Jordan	Group A winners	24 September 2017	2 (1990, 2010)
Tajikistan	Group B winners	24 September 2017	2 (2006, 2010)
Iran	Group C winners	22 September 2017	10 (1996, 1998, 2000, 2004, 2006, **2008**, 2010, 2012, 2014, 2016)
Iraq	Group D winners	24 September 2017	9 (1985, 1988, 1994, 1998, 2004, 2006, 2010, 2012, **2016**)
Yemen	Group E winners	22 September 2017	5 (2002, 2006, 2008, 2012, 2016)
North Korea	Group F winners	24 September 2017	10 (1986, 1988, 1992, 1998, 2004, 2006, **2010**, 2012, **2014**, 2016)
Indonesia	Group G winners	22 September 2017	5 (1986, 1988, 1990, 2008, 2010)
South Korea	Group H winners	29 September 2017	13 (**1986**, 1988, 1990, 1994, 1996, 1998, **2002**, 2004, 2006, 2008, 2012, 2014, 2016)
Australia	Group I winners	24 September 2017	5 (2008, 2010, 2012, 2014, 2016)
Japan	Group J winners	24 September 2017	14 (1985, 1988, **1994**, 1996, 1998, 2000, 2002, 2004, **2006**, 2008, 2010, 2012, 2014, 2016)
India	1st best runners-up	24 September 2017	7 (1990, 1996, 2002, 2004, 2008, 2012, 2016)
Oman	2nd best runners-up	24 September 2017	9 (1994, **1996**, 1998, **2000**, 2004, 2010, 2012, 2014, 2016)
Thailand	3rd best runners-up	24 September 2017	10 (1985, 1988, 1992, 1996, **1998**, 2000, 2004, 2012, 2014, 2016)
Vietnam	5th best runners-up	24 September 2017	6 (2000, 2002, 2004, 2006, 2010, 2016)
Afghanistan	6th best runners-up	29 September 2017	0 (debut)

^{1} Bold indicates champions for that year. Italic indicates hosts for that year.

== Goalscorers ==
10 goals

- (Indonesia) Sutan Zico

8 goals

- (Japan) Keita Nakano

7 goals

- (Australia) Tyson Savas

6 goals

- (Japan) Yusuke Aoki
- (Laos) Chony Wenpaserth

5 goals

- (Japan) Yuji Yoshida
- (Jordan) Mohammad Semreen
- (North Korea) Kim Kang-song
- (Saudi Arabia) Hassan Al-Ali
- (Singapore) Marc Ryan Tan
- (Thailand) Thanarin Tumsen
- (Vietnam) Đoàn Chí Bảo

4 goals

- (Bahrain) Sayed Jawad Alawi
- (North Korea) Ra Nam-hyon
- (South Korea) Jeong Sang-bin
- (Tajikistan) Ahmadkhon Emomali
- (Tajikistan) Rustam Soirov
- (Thailand) Warakorn Thongbai
- (Timor-Leste) Paulo Gali
- (Timor-Leste) Mouzinho

3 goals

- (Afghanistan) Ahmad Shabir Rashidi
- (Australia) Birkan Kirdar
- (Indonesia) Bagus Kahfi
- (Indonesia) Mochammad Supriadi
- (Indonesia) Rendy Juliansyah
- (Indonesia) Hamsa Lestaluhu
- (Iran) Ahmad Shariat
- (Iran) Alireza Bavieh
- (Iran) Amir Jafari
- (Japan) Kuraba Kondo
- (Malaysia) Aiman Haikhal
- (Nepal) Birjesh Chaudhary
- (North Korea) Kim Jin-hyok
- (North Korea) Kim Won-il
- (North Korea) Ri Jo-guk
- (Tajikistan) Islom Zairov
- (Thailand) Nattakit Butsing
- (Yemen) Osamah Al-Baadani

2 goals

- (Afghanistan) Ali Zahidi
- (Afghanistan) Noman Walizada
- (Australia) Cameron Peupion
- (Australia) Noah Botic
- (Australia) Tristan Hammond
- (Bahrain) Abbas Fadhel Al-Asfoor
- (Bahrain) Abdulrahman Sayed
- (Brunei) Aminuddin Masri
- (Cambodia) Ky Rina
- (Chinese Taipei) Lin Chun-kai
- (Chinese Taipei) Yang Sheng-kai
- (Guam) Kyle Halehale
- (Hong Kong) Sean Snelder
- (Hong Kong) Chan Shinichi
- (India) Harpreet Rulbir
- (Indonesia) Amanar Abdillah
- (Iran) Mahdi Seyedi
- (Iran) Shervin Rezaei
- (Japan) Kenta Aoshima
- (Japan) Ryotaro Araki
- (Jordan) Obada Al-Ruzi
- (Jordan) Reziq Bani Hani
- (Kyrgyzstan) Sergei Shipovskii
- (Laos) Sisouphonh Ackhavong
- (Malaysia) Danial Amali
- (Malaysia) Luqman Hakim
- (Malaysia) Danish Ishak
- (Malaysia) Alif Mutalib
- (Mongolia) Temuulen Erdenetsogt
- (North Korea) An Phyong-il
- (North Korea) Won Hyok
- (Oman) Fahad Al-Rasbi
- (Oman) Mulham Al-Sinaidi
- (Oman) Nasser Al-Naabi
- (Oman) Omar Al-Salti
- (Oman) Tariq Al-Mashary
- (Palestine) Mahmoud Wridat
- (Saudi Arabia) Jaber Qarradi
- (Saudi Arabia) Meshari Al-Mashhari
- (Singapore) Vasileios Chua
- (South Korea) Park Se-jun
- (Tajikistan) Sharifbek Rahmatov
- (Thailand) Punnawat Choten-Jirachaithon
- (Timor-Leste) Jhon Frith
- (Timor-Leste) Luis Conceição
- (Timor-Leste) Serafin Brito
- (Uzbekistan) Jasurbek Jaloliddinov
- (Uzbekistan) Temur Mamasidikov
- (Vietnam) Hà Trung Hậu
- (Vietnam) Nguyễn Quốc Hoàng
- (Vietnam) Võ Nguyên Hoàng
- (Yemen) Sultan Thabit

1 goal

- (Afghanistan) Ahmad Tamim Mirzada
- (Afghanistan) Amin Nezami
- (Afghanistan) Samir Samandari
- (Afghanistan) Sayed Asghar
- (Australia) Jaiden Kucharski
- (Australia) Ryan Teague
- (Bangladesh) Dipok Roy
- (Bangladesh) Foysal Ahmed Fahim
- (Bhutan) Kelzang Jigmi
- (Brunei) Ady Aiman
- (Brunei) Abdul Raziq Lamit
- (Brunei) Hakeme Yazid Said
- (Brunei) Eddy Shahrol Izzat
- (Brunei) Hirman Abdul Lapti
- (Cambodia) Bunthoeun Bunnarong
- (Cambodia) Ly Mael
- (Cambodia) Met Samel
- (China) Aifeierding Aisikaer
- (China) Pan Yusheng
- (China) Subi Abulimiti
- (China) Zhang Xingliang
- (Chinese Taipei) Liang Meng-hsin
- (Hong Kong) Tong Connor Hew Fung
- (Hong Kong) Wong Yat
- (Hong Kong) Lau Ka Kiu
- (Hong Kong) Tung Willis Siu Hang
- (India) Bekey Oram
- (India) Givson Singh Moirangthem
- (India) Vikram Pratap Singh
- (Indonesia) Andre Oktaviansyah
- (Iran) Amirhossein Azizi
- (Iran) Hossein Shaverdi
- (Iraq) Ahmed Al-Hilfi
- (Iraq) Abdullah Hameed
- (Iraq) Mohammed Mandalawi
- (Iraq) Abdulrazzaq Qasim
- (Iraq) Hasan Shanan
- (Japan) Genki Koshio
- (Japan) Shinya Nakano
- (Japan) Hikaru Naruoka
- (Japan) Jun Nishikawa
- (Japan) Maaya Sako
- (Japan) Kohshiro Sumi
- (Japan) Keita Ueda
- (Japan) Asahi Yokokawa
- (Jordan) Ahmad Al-Zghoul
- (Jordan) Amer Jamous
- (Jordan) Thaer Khaleel
- (Kyrgyzstan) Bekkhan Rysbekov
- (Laos) Ananthana Chanthamaly
- (Laos) Phoutthalak Thongsanith
- (Laos) Soubanh Keopheth
- (Laos) Phonesavanh Keomanyvong
- (Lebanon) Mohamad Zgheib
- (Lebanon) Ralph Nader Hadchity
- (Lebanon) Wassim Ayach
- (Malaysia) Amirul Azzim
- (Malaysia) Ikhwan Hafizo
- (Malaysia) Harith Haiqal
- (Malaysia) Umar Hakeem
- (Malaysia) Firdaus Kaironnisam
- (Malaysia) Faiz Khairi
- (Malaysia) Ahmad Zikri Khalili
- (Malaysia) Harith Naem
- (Malaysia) Aleff Haedi Za’ba
- (Mongolia) Gan-erdene Erdene-ochir
- (Myanmar) Kaung Khant Kyaw
- (Myanmar) Pyae Phyo Aung
- (Myanmar) Shwe Ko
- (Myanmar) Yan Naing Lin
- (Myanmar) Ye Htet Aung
- (Myanmar) Zaw Win Thein
- (Northern Mariana Islands) Ian Maniago
- (North Korea) Kim Jin-guk
- (North Korea) Ko Chang-ung
- (North Korea) Ri Hun
- (North Korea) Ri Yong-gwang
- (North Korea) Song Hyok
- (Oman) Al Azhar Al-Balushi
- (Oman) Issa Al-Naabi
- (Oman) Osama Al-Hadabi
- (Oman) Qusai Al-Jaradi
- (Qatar) Jassim Al-Zarra
- (Saudi Arabia) Abdullah Al-Beshi
- (Saudi Arabia) Bander Whaeshi
- (Saudi Arabia) Basim Hassan
- (Saudi Arabia) Khalid Kaabi
- (Saudi Arabia) Rayan Al-Arfaj
- (Singapore) Farhan Zulkifli
- (Singapore) Fathullah Rahmat
- (South Korea) Choi Min-seo
- (South Korea) Hong Yun-sang
- (South Korea) Kim Dong-hyeon
- (South Korea) Lee Jun-suk
- (South Korea) Lee Tae-seok
- (South Korea) Paik Sang-hoon
- (South Korea) Yoon Suk-ju
- (Syria) Abdal Rahman Al-Khatib
- (Syria) Ahmad Amara
- (Syria) Ahmad Hatem
- (Syria) Mohammad Maatouk
- (Syria) Omar Naghnugh
- (Syria) Yasin Abo Karsh
- (Tajikistan) Azizbek Khasanov
- (Tajikistan) Isroil Kholov
- (Tajikistan) Shohrukh Sangov
- (Thailand) Arthit Bua-ngam
- (Thailand) Jakkapong Sanmahung
- (Thailand) Thakdanai Jaihan
- (Timor-Leste) Elias
- (Timor-Leste) Ejivanio
- (Uzbekistan) Daniyar Sabirov
- (Uzbekistan) Mirjalol Kosimov
- (Uzbekistan) Ruslan Roziev
- (Vietnam) Đậu Ngọc Thành
- (Vietnam) Đinh Thanh Trung
- (Vietnam) Nguyễn Thế Hùng
- (Vietnam) Võ Minh Đan
- (Yemen) Hamzah Sabah
- (Yemen) Tamer Senan
- (Yemen) Yahya Al-Baleet

1 own goal

- (Laos) Anoulack Vannalath (against Thailand)
- (Macau) Xiao Rongrui (against North Korea)
- (Maldives) Ahmed Nahil Ibrahim (against Tajikistan)
- (Northern Mariana Islands) Joshua Mendez (against Timor Leste)
- (Sri Lanka) Arichandran Thanujan (against Saudi Arabia)
- (Timor-Leste) Luis Conceição (against Laos)

2 own goals

- (Guam) Robert Niu (against Japan, Singapore)
