= Kyle Halehale =

Guamanian soccer player

Personal information
- Full name: Kyle Ko Halehale
- Date of birth: 3 June 2002 (age 24)
- Place of birth: Tamuning, Guam
- Height: 1.77 m (5 ft 10 in)
- Position: Midfielder

Youth career
- Bank of Guam Strykers

College career
Years	Team	Apps	(Gls)
2020–2024	Central Connecticut Blue Devils	47	(5)
2024	Mercyhurst Lakers	16	(1)

Senior career*
Years	Team	Apps	(Gls)
2017–2018	Bank of Guam Strykers		(14+)
2019–2020	Manhoben Lalåhi		(11)
2021	→ Hartford City FC (loan)		
2024	→ Staten Island Athletic (loan)		

International career^{‡}
2015–2017	Guam U17	6	(2)
2019	Guam U20	3	(0)
2018–	Guam	14	(0)
- * Club domestic league appearances and goals ‡ National team caps and goals as of 18:49, 29 March 2026 (UTC)

Kyle Ko Halehale (born 3 June 2002) is a Guamanian soccer player who plays as a midfielder for the Guam national team.

== College career ==
Halehale started all seven of CCSU's games in the shortened 2020 season, where he scored two goals. He scored his first goal in a 3–0 win vs. Fairleigh Dickinson on 22 March 2021.

== International career ==
Halehale was part of Guam under-17 team during qualifying rounds of 2016 AFC U-16 Championship and 2018 AFC U-16 Championship. Halehale netted one goal each against Malaysia and against Singapore.

Halehale made his senior team debut on 2 September 2018, coming on as a 69th minute substitute for Shawn Nicklaw in a 4–0 win against Northern Mariana Islands.

== Career statistics ==
=== International ===
As of match played 28 March 2026

Appearances and goals by national team and year
National team	Year	Apps	Goals
Guam	2018	3	0
Guam	2019	3	0
Guam	2020	0	0
Guam	2021	2	0
Guam	2022	0	0
Guam	2023	2	0
Guam	2024	4	0
Guam	2025	—	
Guam	2026	1	0
Total		14	0
