= Marc Ryan Tan =

Singaporean footballer

Personal information
- Full name: Marc Ryan Tan Wei Ming
- Date of birth: 18 January 2002 (age 24)
- Place of birth: Singapore
- Positions: Forward; right wing

Youth career
- National Football Academy

Senior career*
Years	Team	Apps	(Gls)
2019–2020	Young Lions	10	(0)
2021–2024	Tampines Rovers	21	(4)
2023–2024	Young Lions (loan)	0	(0)
Total		31	(4)

International career^{‡}
2017	Singapore U16	6	(6)
- * Club domestic league appearances and goals as of 14 May 2021 ‡ National team caps and goals as of 23 February 2020

Marc Ryan Tan Wei Ming (born 18 January 2002) is a Singaporean former professional footballer who played as a left-winger, right-winger or right-midfielder. He is the son of former Singapore International footballer, Steven Tan.

== Club career ==
=== Early career ===
Marc, together with 4 other boys, impressed West Ham's academy coaches, who conducted a training camp for about 25 youth footballers in Singapore in November 2015. They later went on trials and trainings with English clubs such as Wolverhampton Wanderers, Stoke City, Charlton Athletic FC and West Ham academy teams in 2016. The attacker models his game on Chile international Alexis Sánchez and England star Raheem Sterling.

=== Young Lions ===
Marc signed with the Young Lions in 2019. However, he did not make his debut in the 2019 season. Marc made his professional debut on March 11, 2020 in a 3-0 lost against Geylang International. He was named in Goal Singapore's 2020 NxGn list as one of the country's biggest talents shortly after.

== Personal life ==
Tan was born on 18 January 2002 in Singapore and is the son of Singaporean footballing legend Steven Tan. He attended Maris Stella High School and Singapore Sports School before studying in Temasek Polytechnic. His father is currently the head coach of the Temasek Polytechnic's football team.

== Career statistics ==
=== Club ===
As of match played 16 March 2022. Caps and goals may not be correct.

Appearances and goals by club, season and competition
Club	Season	League			National Cup		League Cup		Asia		Total	
Club	Season	Division	Apps	Goals	Apps	Goals	Apps	Goals	Apps	Goals	Apps	Goals
Young Lions	2019	Singapore Premier League	1	0	0	0	0	0	—		1	0
Young Lions	2020	Singapore Premier League	9	0	0	0	0	0	—		9	0
Young Lions	Total		10	0	0	0	0	0	0	0	10	0
Tampines Rovers	2021	Singapore Premier League	14	3	0	0	0	0	5	0	19	3
Tampines Rovers	2022	Singapore Premier League	7	1	0	0	0	0	0	0	7	1
Tampines Rovers	Total		21	4	0	0	0	0	5	0	26	4
Career total			31	4	0	0	0	0	5	0	36	4

- Young Lions are ineligible for qualification to AFC competitions in their respective leagues.

=== International ===
==== U16 International caps ====
No	Date	Venue	Opponent	Result	Competition
1	17 March 2017	Po Kong Village Road Park, Hong Kong	Hong Kong	0-6 (lost)	2017 Jockey Cup
2	18 March 2017	Po Kong Village Road Park, Hong Kong	Thailand	1-5 (lost)	2017 Jockey Cup
3	19 March 2017	Po Kong Village Road Park, Hong Kong	Qatar	3-0 (won)	2017 Jockey Cup
4	20 September 2017	Wibawa Mukti Stadium, Indonesia	Malaysia	1-6 (lost)	2018 AFC U-16 Championship qualification
5	22 September 2017	Wibawa Mukti Stadium, Indonesia	Japan	0-11 (lost)	2018 AFC U-16 Championship qualification
6	24 September 2017	Wibawa Mukti Stadium, Indonesia	Guam	9-1 (won)	2018 AFC U-16 Championship qualification

==== U16 International goals ====
No	Date	Venue	Opponent	Score	Result	Competition
1	19 March 2017	Po Kong Village Road Park, Hong Kong	Qatar	2-0	3-0 (won)	2017 Jockey Cup
2	20 September 2017	Wibawa Mukti Stadium, Indonesia	Malaysia	1-3	1-6 (lost)	2018 AFC U-16 Championship qualification
3	24 September 2017	Wibawa Mukti Stadium, Indonesia	Guam	1-0	9-1 (won)	2018 AFC U-16 Championship qualification
4	24 September 2017	Wibawa Mukti Stadium, Indonesia	Guam	2-0	9-1 (won)	2018 AFC U-16 Championship qualification
5	24 September 2017	Wibawa Mukti Stadium, Indonesia	Guam	3-0	9-1 (won)	2018 AFC U-16 Championship qualification
6	24 September 2017	Wibawa Mukti Stadium, Indonesia	Guam	4-0	9-1 (won)	2018 AFC U-16 Championship qualification
