= Jayden Gorman =

Australian soccer player

Personal information
- Full name: Jayden Shaye Gorman
- Date of birth: 25 January 2003 (age 23)
- Place of birth: Australia
- Position: Forward

Team information
- Current team: Greenock Morton
- Number: 9

Youth career
- –2016: Sorrento FC
- 2016–2018: Perth Glory
- 2019: Perth SC

Senior career*
Years	Team	Apps	(Gls)
2019	Perth Glory NPL	1	(2)
2019–2021	Perth SC	25	(9)
2022–2024	Perth Glory NPL	23	(11)
2022–2024	Perth Glory	7	(0)
2024–2025	Heidelberg United	5	(0)
2025–2026	Kingsway		
2026	Dubai City	16	(15)
2026–	Greenock Morton	4	(0)
- * Club domestic league appearances and goals as of 13:19, 13 November 2026 (UTC)

Jayden Gorman (born 25 January 2003) is an Australian professional soccer player who plays as a forward for Greenock Morton.

Gorman joined Greenock Morton on a one-year deal in July 2026.
