= Subhan Fajri =

Indonesian footballer

Personal information
- Full name: Subhan Fajri
- Date of birth: 13 May 2003 (age 23)
- Place of birth: Bireun, Indonesia
- Height: 1.69 m (5 ft 7 in)
- Position: Winger

Youth career
- 2019: Barito Putera U16
- 2019–2020: Garuda Select

Senior career*
Years	Team	Apps	(Gls)
2020–2022	Persiraja Banda Aceh	11	(0)
2022–2023	Dewa United	2	(0)

International career^{‡}
2022	Indonesia U19	6	(0)
2021	Indonesia U23	3	(0)
- * Club domestic league appearances and goals as of 7 August 2022 ‡ National team caps and goals as of 8 July 2022

Subhan Fajri (born 13 May 2003) is an Indonesian professional footballer who plays as a winger.

== Club career ==
=== Persiraja Banda Aceh ===
He was signed for Persiraja Banda Aceh to play in Liga 1 in the 2021 season. Fajri made his first-team debut on 11 September 2021 in a match against PSS Sleman at the Gelora Bung Karno Madya Stadium, Jakarta.

=== Dewa United ===
Subhan was signed for Dewa United to play in Liga 1 in the 2022–23 season. He made his league debut on 31 July 2022 in a match against Persikabo 1973 at the Indomilk Arena, Tangerang.

== International career ==
In 2018, Fajri represented the Indonesia U-16, in the 2018 AFC U-16 Championship. On 30 May 2022, Fajri made his debut for an Indonesian youth team against a Venezuela U20 squad in the 2022 Maurice Revello Tournament in France.

== Career statistics ==
=== Club ===
As of 7 August 2022.

Club	Season	League			Cup		Continental		Other		Total	
Club	Season	Division	Apps	Goals	Apps	Goals	Apps	Goals	Apps	Goals	Apps	Goals
Persiraja Banda Aceh	2021–22	Liga 1	11	0	0	0	–		0	0	11	0
Dewa United	2022–23	Liga 1	2	0	0	0	–		0	0	2	0
Dewa United	2023–24	Liga 1	0	0	0	0	–		0	0	0	0
Dewa United	2024–25	Liga 1	0	0	0	0	–		0	0	0	0
Career total			13	0	0	0	0	0	0	0	13	0
