= Fadillah Nur Rahman =

Indonesian footballer

Personal information
- Full name: Fadillah Nur Rahman
- Date of birth: 10 February 2002 (age 24)
- Place of birth: Padang Pariaman, Indonesia
- Height: 1.68 m (5 ft 6 in)
- Positions: Left-back; centre-back

Youth career
- 2017: SSB Nagari Kataping
- 2018: PPLP Sumatra Barat
- 2018–2020: SKO Ragunan
- 2019: Garuda Select

Senior career*
Years	Team	Apps	(Gls)
2020–2023	Madura United	5	(0)
2021	→ Kalteng Putra (loan)	1	(0)
2023–2024	PSPS Riau	7	(0)

International career^{‡}
2017–2018	Indonesia U16	15	(0)
Medal record
Men's football
Representing Indonesia
AFF U-16 Youth Championship
Winner	2018 Indonesia
- * Club domestic league appearances and goals as of 6 February 2024 ‡ National team caps and goals as of 1 October 2018

Fadillah Nur Rahman (born 10 February 2002) is an Indonesian professional footballer who plays as a defender.

== Club career ==
=== Madura United ===
Fadillah signed with Madura United to play in the Indonesian Liga 1 for the 2020 season. This season was suspended on 27 March 2020 due to the COVID-19 pandemic. The season was abandoned and was declared void on 20 January 2021. He made his professional debut on 5 February 2022 in a match against Persela Lamongan at the Ngurah Rai Stadium, Denpasar.

==== Kalteng Putra (loan) ====
In 2021, Fadillah signed a contract with Indonesian Liga 2 club Kalteng Putra. He made his league debut on 10 November 2021 in a match against Persewar Waropen at the Batakan Stadium, Balikpapan.

== International career ==
Fadillah was part of the Indonesia U-16 team that won the 2018 AFF U-16 Youth Championship.

== Career statistics ==
=== Club ===
As of 6 February 2024.

Club	Season	League			Cup		Continental		Other		Total	
Club	Season	Division	Apps	Goals	Apps	Goals	Apps	Goals	Apps	Goals	Apps	Goals
Madura United	2021–22	Liga 1	4	0	0	0	–		0	0	4	0
Madura United	2022–23	Liga 1	1	0	0	0	–		0	0	1	0
Kalteng Putra (loan)	2021	Liga 2	1	0	0	0	–		0	0	1	0
PSPS Riau	2023–24	Liga 2	7	0	0	0	–		0	0	7	0
Career total			13	0	0	0	0	0	0	0	13	0

== Honours ==
=== International ===
Indonesia U-16

- JENESYS Japan-ASEAN U-16 Youth Football Tournament: 2017
- AFF U-16 Youth Championship: 2018
