= Hasan Hadi =

Iraqi film director and screenwriter

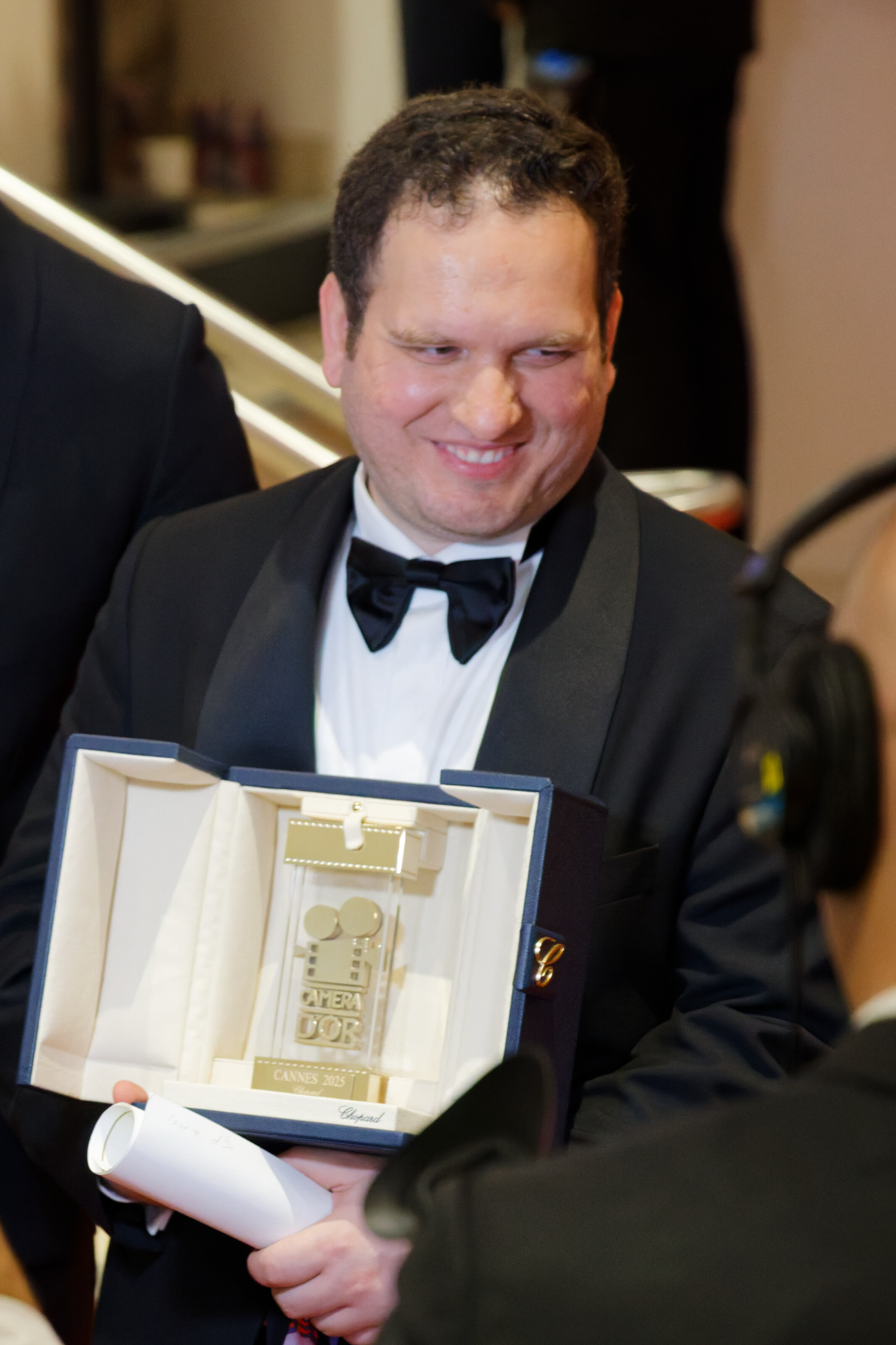
- Hadi at the 2025 Cannes Film Festival
- Occupations: Film director; screenwriter
- Notable work: The President's Cake (2025)
- Awards: Caméra d'Or (2025); Directors' Fortnight People's Choice (2025); Urbanworld Film Festival – Best Narrative Short (for Swimsuit) (2021)

Hasan Hadi is an Iraqi film director and screenwriter. His debut feature film, The President's Cake (2025), won the Caméra d'Or for best first feature film at the 2025 Cannes Film Festival. The film was selected for the Directors' Fortnight (Quinzaine des Cinéastes) and won the section's People's Choice award.

== Early life and education ==
Hadi grew up in southern Iraq during wartime. He has worked in journalism and film production. He was an MFA candidate at New York University (NYU) Tisch School of the Arts and previously worked as a researcher for The Wall Street Journal.

== Career ==
=== Short films and fellowships ===
Hadi directed the short film Swimsuit, which won Best Narrative Short at the 2021 Urbanworld Film Festival.

In 2022, Hadi was among the fellows of the Sundance Institute for its January Screenwriters Lab.

=== The President's Cake ===
Hadi wrote and directed The President's Cake, a feature film set in 1990s Iraq under Saddam Hussein. In the film, a nine-year-old girl is tasked with gathering ingredients for a mandatory birthday cake for the president under conditions of sanctions and scarcity.

At the 2025 Cannes Film Festival, The President's Cake won the Caméra d'Or; in his acceptance remarks, Hadi said the award marked the first time an Iraqi film had received an award at Cannes. The film also won the Directors' Fortnight People's Choice award. Sony Pictures Classics acquired distribution rights for multiple regions in May 2025.

In November 2025, it was announced that Iraq submitted The President's Cake as its official entry for the Academy Award for Best International Feature Film (2026 awards season).

== Filmography ==
- Swimsuit (short film)
- The President's Cake (feature film; 2025)

== Awards and honours ==
- 2025 – Caméra d'Or (The President's Cake).
- 2025 – Directors' Fortnight (Quinzaine des Cinéastes) People's Choice (The President's Cake).
- 2021 – Urbanworld Film Festival, Best Narrative Short (Swimsuit).
