= Amir Jafari (footballer) =

Iranian footballer (born 2002)

Personal information
- Full name: Amir Jafari Seyqalani
- Date of birth: 18 January 2002 (age 24)
- Place of birth: Fuman, Iran
- Height: 1.76 m (5 ft 9 in)
- Position: Left-back

Team information
- Current team: Gol Gohar
- Number: 14

Youth career
- –2020: Paykan
- 2020–2021: Shahr Khodro

Senior career*
Years	Team	Apps	(Gls)
2021–2022	Shahr Khodro	7	(0)
2022–	Gol Gohar	43	(1)

International career^{‡}
2018	Iran U16	4	(1)
2022–2023	Iran U23	16	(0)
- * Club domestic league appearances and goals as of 2 May 2025 ‡ National team caps and goals as of 1 October 2023

Amir Jafari Seyqalani (Persian: امیر جعفری صیقلانی; born 18 January 2002) is an Iranian footballer who plays as a left-back for Gol Gohar in the Persian Gulf Pro League.

== Club career ==
=== Shahr Khodro ===
He made his debut for Shahr Khodro in 26th fixtures of 2020–21 Persian Gulf Pro League against Naft Masjed Soleyman while he substituted in for Amir Hossein Karimi.

=== Gol Gohar ===
He joined Gol Gohar in the summer of 2022 and his good performances made him one of the candidates for the best young player of the year. He scored his first goal in the Premier League against Foolad on 15 April 2023.
