= Shinya Nakano (footballer) =

Japanese association football player

Shinya Nakano 中野 伸哉
Personal information
- Full name: Shinya Nakano
- Date of birth: 17 August 2003 (age 23)
- Place of birth: Saga, Japan
- Height: 1.73 m (5 ft 8 in)
- Position: Left back

Team information
- Current team: Gamba Osaka
- Number: 47

Youth career
- –2020: Sagan Tosu

Senior career*
Years	Team	Apps	(Gls)
2020–2024	Sagan Tosu	71	(1)
2023	→ Gamba Osaka (loan)	6	(0)
2024–	Gamba Osaka	28	(1)
2025	→ Shonan Bellmare (loan)	10	(0)

International career^{‡}
2017–2018	Japan U15	12	(1)
2018	Japan U16	15	(0)
2019	Japan U17	9	(0)
2020–2021	Japan U18	3	(0)
2021–	Japan U23	1	(0)
- * Club domestic league appearances and goals as of 9 August 2026 ‡ National team caps and goals as of 23:20, 7 July 2021 (UTC)

Shinya Nakano (中野 伸哉, Nakano Shin'ya; born 17 August 2003) is a Japanese footballer who plays as a left back for J1 League club Gamba Osaka.

== Career statistics ==
As of 9 April 2026

Appearances and goals by club, season and competition
Club	Season	League			National cup (Note: Includes Emperors Cup)		League cup (Note: Includes J.League Cup)		Total	
Club	Season	Division	Apps	Goals	Apps	Goals	Apps	Goals	Apps	Goals
Sagan Tosu	2020	J1 League	14	0	0	0	1	0	15	0
Sagan Tosu	2021	J1 League	34	0	2	0	2	0	38	0
Sagan Tosu	2022	J1 League	19	1	2	0	6	0	27	1
Sagan Tosu	2023	J1 League	4	0	2	0	3	0	9	0
Sagan Tosu	Total		71	1	6	0	12	0	89	1
Gamba Osaka (loan)	2023	J1 League	6	0	0	0	0	0	6	0
Gamba Osaka	2024	J1 League	12	0	1	0	1	0	14	0
Gamba Osaka	2025	J1 League	7	0	2	0	2	0	11	0
Gamba Osaka	Total		19	0	3	0	3	0	25	0
Shonan Bellmare (loan)	2025	J1 League	10	0	–		1	0	11	0
Career total			106	1	9	0	16	0	131	1

== Honours ==
Japan U16

- AFC U-16 Championship: 2018

Gamba Osaka

- AFC Champions League Two: 2025–26
