= Keita Nakano =

Japanese footballer

Personal information
- Full name: Keita Nakano
- Date of birth: 27 August 2002 (age 24)
- Place of birth: Kusatsu, Shiga, Japan
- Height: 1.67 m (5 ft 6 in)
- Position: Midfielder

Team information
- Current team: Tegevajaro Miyazaki
- Number: 13

Youth career
- FC Kusatsu
- 2015–2021: Kyoto Sanga

Senior career*
Years	Team	Apps	(Gls)
2021–2023	Kyoto Sanga	4	(0)
2023–2025	Tokushima Vortis	11	(0)
2024	Vanraure Hachinohe (loan)	2	(0)
2025-	Tegevajaro Miyazaki	14	(0)

International career
2017–2019	Japan U17	18	(13)
- * Club domestic league appearances and goals as of 1 January 2026

Keita Nakano (中野 桂太, Nakano Keita; born 27 August 2002) is a Japanese professional footballer who plays as a midfielder for Tegevajaro Miyazaki.

== Career statistics ==
As of 3 November 2023

Appearances and goals by club, season and competition
Club	Season	League			National Cup		League Cup		Other		Total	
Club	Season	Division	Apps	Goals	Apps	Goals	Apps	Goals	Apps	Goals	Apps	Goals
Japan			League		Emperor's Cup		J. League Cup		Other		Total	
Kyoto Sanga	2021	J2 League	2	0	1	0	–		–		3	0
Kyoto Sanga	2022	J1 League	2	0	5	1	3	1	–		10	2
Kyoto Sanga	Total		4	0	6	1	3	1	0	0	13	2
Tokushima Vortis	2023	J2 League	6	0	2	0	–		–		8	0
Career total			10	0	8	1	3	1	0	0	21	2

== Honours ==
Japan U16

- AFC U-16 Championship: 2018
