= Tristan Hammond =

Australian soccer player

Personal information
- Full name: Tristan Shane Hammond
- Date of birth: 5 January 2003 (age 23)
- Place of birth: Westmead, Australia
- Height: 1.72 m (5 ft 8 in)
- Position: Winger

Youth career
- 2014–2015: Belenenses
- 2015–2021: Sporting

Senior career*
Years	Team	Apps	(Gls)
2021–2023	Austria Wien II	21	(2)
2026–	NWS Spirit	2	(0)

International career^{‡}
2018–2019	Australia U17	10	(1)
2022	Australia U23	2	(0)
- * Club domestic league appearances and goals as of 21 February 2026 ‡ National team caps and goals as of 7 June 2022

Tristan Shane Hammond (born 5 January 2003) is an Australian soccer player who plays as a winger for NPL NSW club NWS Spirit.

== Club career ==
At the age of 11, Hammond joined the youth academy of Portuguese side Belenenses.

He later joined the youth academy of Sporting, one of the most successful clubs in Portugal.

In 2021, Hammond signed for Austrian second division team Austria Wien II. On 27 August 2021, Hammond debuted for Austria Wien II during a 2–0 loss to St. Pölten. He departed the club on 1 July 2023 after his contract was not renewed.

== International career ==
Hammond represented Australia at the 2019 FIFA U-17 World Cup. Hammond is eligible to represent Peru internationally through his mother.

== Personal life ==
He has a younger brother, Aydan Hammond, who currently plays for Western Sydney Wanderers in the A-League Men.
