= Maaya Sako =

Japanese footballer

Maaya Sako 佐古 真礼
Personal information
- Date of birth: 2 December 2002 (age 23)
- Place of birth: Tokyo, Japan
- Height: 1.93 m (6 ft 4 in)
- Position: Defender

Team information
- Current team: Tokyo Verdy
- Number: 29

Youth career
- –2021: Tokyo Verdy

Senior career*
Years	Team	Apps	(Gls)
2021–	Tokyo Verdy	4	(0)
2021	→ Fujieda MYFC (loan)	10	(2)
2023	→ AC Nagano Parceiro (loan)	17	(0)
2024	→ Iwate Grulla Morioka (loan)	16	(0)

International career
2017	Japan U15		
2017–2018	Japan U16		
2020	Japan U18		
- * Club domestic league appearances and goals as of 23:01, 20 January 2025 (UTC)

Maaya Sako (佐古 真礼, Sako Maaya; born 2 December 2002) is a Japanese footballer currently playing as a defender for J1 League club Tokyo Verdy.

== Career statistics ==
=== Club ===
As of end of 2024 season.

Appearances and goals by club, season and competition
Club	Season	League			National Cup		League Cup		Other		Total	
Club	Season	Division	Apps	Goals	Apps	Goals	Apps	Goals	Apps	Goals	Apps	Goals
Japan			League		Emperor's Cup		J. League Cup		Other		Total	
Tokyo Verdy	2021	J2 League	0	0	0	0	–		–		0	0
Tokyo Verdy	2022	J2 League	4	0	2	0	–		–		6	0
Tokyo Verdy	Total		4	0	2	0	0	0	0	0	6	0
Fujieda MYFC (loan)	2021	J3 League	10	2	0	0	–		–		10	2
AC Nagano Parceiro (loan)	2023	J3 League	17	0	1	0	–		–		18	0
Iwate Grulla Morioka (loan)	2024	J3 League	16	0	2	0	1	0	–		19	0
Career total			47	2	5	0	1	0	0	0	53	2

== Honours ==
Japan U16

- AFC U-16 Championship: 2018
