= WAFF U-17 Championship =

- Founded: 2005; 21 years ago
- Region: West Asia (WAFF)
- Teams: 7 (as of 2026)
- Current champions: Lebanon (1st title)
- Most championships: Iran; Iraq; Yemen; Syria; Saudi Arabia (2 titles each)
- 2026 WAFF U-17 Championship

The WAFF U-17 Championship (Arabic: بطولة اتحاد غرب آسيا للناشئين تحت 17 عاماً) is an international football competition contested by the men's under-17 national teams of the West Asian Football Federation (WAFF) member associations. It is part of WAFF's youth championship programme, which was inaugurated in 2005 with an under-15 tournament, won by hosts Iran. The competition has subsequently been held under different age designations, including under-15 and under-16, before being established as an under-17 competition.

== History ==
The first WAFF youth championship was held in Hamadan, Iran, in 2005 as an under-15 competition. Six national teams participated: Iran, Iraq, Syria, Lebanon, Jordan, and Palestine. The competition continued at under-15 level through 2007 and 2009.

The 2013 edition was held in Palestine as the WAFF U-16 Championship. It attracted international attention after several members of the participating teams were initially denied entry to the West Bank by Israeli authorities. The incident prompted calls for action from FIFA and UEFA, before the necessary entry permits were issued and the tournament was allowed to proceed. Iraq won the tournament.

The 2015 edition was won by Iraq, who successfully defended the regional title won in 2013. The tournament was contested by five teams in a round-robin format. The 2018 edition was also held at under-16 level, with Japan participating as a guest team and winning the tournament after four victories. The competition returned to under-15 level in 2019. It remained at that age level in 2021, when Yemen won the title for the first time.

In 2022, the competition returned to under-16 level. Hosts Jordan defeated Lebanon 1–0 in the final to win the championship for the first time. The 2023 edition, held in Oman, was contested at under-15 level. It was the tenth edition of the WAFF youth championship and featured eight teams divided into two groups of four, followed by semi-finals and a final. Saudi Arabia won the tournament after defeating Yemen on penalties in the final. The competition returned to under-16 level in 2024, which was held in Jordan. Syria defeated Saudi Arabia on penalties in the final to win their second title.

The 2025 edition marked the first time that the competition was held at under-17 level. It was hosted by Jordan, with Saudi Arabia winning their second title after defeating Lebanon on penalties in the final. The competition continued at under-17 level in 2026, with seven teams participating in the tournament in Jordan. Lebanon defeated Yemen on penalties in the final to win the championship for the first time.

== Results ==
WAFF U-17 Championship
Edition	Year	Host	Final			Third place match			No. of Teams
Edition	Year	Host	Champions	Score	Runners-up	Third place	Score	Fourth place	No. of Teams
1	2005	Iran	Iran	2–0; Shariati Stadium, Karaj	Syria	Iraq	5–0; Shariati Stadium, Karaj	Lebanon	6
2	2007	Syria	Syria	(Note: The tournament was played in a round-robin league format.)	Iran	Jordan		Iraq	5
3	2009	Jordan	Iran	3–2; Petra Stadium, Amman	Syria	Iraq	3–1; Petra Stadium, Amman	Jordan	9
4	2013	Palestine	Iraq		United Arab Emirates	Jordan		Palestine	4
5	2015	Jordan	Iraq		Saudi Arabia	United Arab Emirates		Palestine	5
6	2018	Jordan	Japan		India	Jordan		Yemen	5
7	2019	Jordan	Saudi Arabia		Jordan	Syria		Iraq	9
8	2021	Saudi Arabia	Yemen	1–1 (a.e.t.) (5–4 (p)); Prince Mohamed bin Fahd Stadium, Dammam	Saudi Arabia	Syria and United Arab Emirates (Note: The two semi-finalists did not play a third-place match.)			9
9	2022	Jordan	Jordan	1–0; Aqaba Stadium, Aqaba	Lebanon	Iraq and Syria			8
10	2023	Oman	Yemen	1–1 (a.e.t.) (3–2 (p)); Al-Saada Stadium, Salalah	Saudi Arabia	Iraq and United Arab Emirates			8
11	2024	Jordan	Syria	1–0; Aqaba Stadium, Aqaba	Saudi Arabia	Jordan and Palestine			9
12	2025	Jordan	Saudi Arabia	1–1 (a.e.t.) (5–3 (p)); Aqaba Stadium, Aqaba	Lebanon	Jordan and Syria			7
13	2026	Jordan	Lebanon	1–1 (4–3 (p)); Aqaba Stadium, Aqaba	Yemen	Jordan and United Arab Emirates			7

== Teams reaching the top four ==
Teams reaching the top four
Team	Titles	Runners-up	Third place	Fourth place	Semi-finalist	Total
Saudi Arabia	2 (2019, 2025)	4 (2015, 2021^{*}, 2023, 2024)				6
Syria	2 (2007^{*}, 2024)	2 (2005, 2009)	1 (2019)		3 (2021, 2022, 2025)	8
Yemen	2 (2021, 2023)	1 (2026)		1 (2018)		4
Iran	2 (2005^{*}, 2009)	1 (2007)				3
Iraq	2 (2013, 2015)		2 (2005, 2009)	2 (2007, 2019)	2 (2022, 2023)	8
Lebanon	1 (2026)	2 (2022, 2025)		1 (2005)		4
Jordan	1 (2022^{*})	1 (2019^{*})	3 (2007, 2013, 2018^{*})	1 (2009^{*})	3 (2024^{*}, 2025^{*}, 2026^{*})	9
Japan	1 (2018)					1
United Arab Emirates		1 (2013)	1 (2015)		3 (2021, 2023, 2026)	5
India		1 (2018)				1
Palestine				2 (2013^{*}, 2015)	1 (2024)	3

* = hosts

== See also ==
- WAFF Championship
- WAFF U-23 Championship
- WAFF U-19 Championship
- AFC U-17 Asian Cup
