= 2021 WAFF U-15 Championship =

بطولة اتحاد غرب آسيا الثامنة للناشئين

Tournament details
- Host country: Saudi Arabia
- City: Dammam
- Dates: 5–15 December
- Teams: 9 (from 1 sub-confederation)
- Venue: 1 (in 1 host city)

Final positions
- Champions: Yemen (1st title)
- Runners-up: Saudi Arabia

Tournament statistics
- Matches played: 12
- Goals scored: 41 (3.42 per match)

2021 WAFF U-15 Championship was the eighth edition of the WAFF U-16 Championship, the international youth football championship organised by the West Asian Football Federation (WAFF) for the men's under-15 national teams of West Asia. It was held in Dammam, Saudi Arabia from 5 to 15 December 2021. It was originally scheduled for 15–25 October 2021, but was postponed due to logistical reasons.

== Participating nations ==
All West Asian Federation teams entered the competition except Qatar, Oman and Kuwait.

Team	Appearance	Last appearance	Previous best performance
Bahrain	3rd	2019	Group stage (2009, 2019)
Iraq	8th	2019	Champions (2013, 2015)
Jordan	8th	2018	Runners-up (2018)
Lebanon	3rd	2007	Fourth place (2005)
Palestine	5th	2015	Group stage (2005, 2009, 2013, 2015)
Saudi Arabia	3rd	2019	Champions (2019)
Syria	4th	2009	Champions (2007)
United Arab Emirates	4th	2015	Runners-up (2013)
Yemen	3rd	2018	Fourth place (2018)

== Group stage ==
=== Group A ===
Pos	Team	Pld	W	D	L	GF	GA	GD	Pts	Qualification
1	Saudi Arabia	2	2	0	0	5	1	+4	6	Knockout stage
2	Iraq	2	1	0	1	3	3	0	3	
3	Lebanon	2	0	0	2	1	5	−4	0	

Source: WAFF
5 December 2021
18:45

Lebanon	1–2	Saudi Arabia

Prince Mohamed bin Fahd Stadium, Dammam
7 December 2019
17:00

Iraq	3–0	Lebanon

Prince Nayef bin Abdulaziz Stadium, Saihat
9 December 2021
18:45

Saudi Arabia	3–0	Iraq

Prince Mohamed bin Fahd Stadium, Dammam

=== Group B ===
Pos	Team	Pld	W	D	L	GF	GA	GD	Pts	Qualification
1	United Arab Emirates	2	2	0	0	6	1	+5	6	Knockout stage
2	Syria	2	1	0	1	7	4	+3	3	Knockout stage
3	Palestine	2	0	0	2	0	8	−8	0	

Source: WAFF
5 December 2021
17:00

United Arab Emirates	4–1	Syria

Prince Nayef bin Abdulaziz Stadium, Saihat
7 December 2021
15:00

Palestine	0–2	United Arab Emirates

Prince Mohamed bin Fahd Stadium, Dammam
9 December 2021
17:00

Syria	6–0	Palestine

Prince Nayef bin Abdulaziz Stadium, Saihat

=== Group C ===
Pos	Team	Pld	W	D	L	GF	GA	GD	Pts	Qualification
1	Yemen	2	2	0	0	8	1	+7	6	Knockout stage
2	Jordan	2	1	0	1	5	3	+2	3	
3	Bahrain	2	0	0	2	0	9	−9	0	

Source: WAFF
5 December 2021
15:00

Jordan	4–0	Bahrain

Prince Mohamed bin Fahd Stadium, Dammam
7 December 2021
18:45

Yemen	3–1	Jordan

Prince Mohamed bin Fahd Stadium, Dammam
9 December 2021
15:00

Bahrain	0–5	Yemen

Prince Mohamed bin Fahd Stadium, Dammam

== Knockout stage ==
=== Bracket ===
Semi-finals
11 December
Yemen	2
Syria	1
11 December
Saudi Arabia	3
United Arab Emirates	0

Final
13 December
Yemen (p)	1 (4)
Saudi Arabia	1 (3)

=== Semi finals ===
11 December 2021
15:00

Yemen	2–1	Syria
Al-Khadher 51'; Radman 52'		70'

Prince Mohamed bin Fahd Stadium, Dammam
11 December 2021
18:45

Saudi Arabia	3–0	United Arab Emirates
Al-Bashri 6'; Al-Shamrani 52'; 67' (o.g.)

Prince Mohamed bin Fahd Stadium, Dammam

=== Final ===
13 December 2021
18:45

Saudi Arabia	1–1	Yemen
Al-Issa 90+2'		Al-Brwany 46'
Penalties
	3–4

Prince Mohamed bin Fahd Stadium, Dammam
