= 2019 WAFF U-15 Championship =

بطولة اتحاد غرب آسيا السابعة للناشئين

Tournament details
- Host country: Jordan
- City: Zarqa
- Dates: 1–11 July
- Teams: 9 (from 1 sub-confederation)
- Venue: 1 (in 1 host city)

Final positions
- Champions: Saudi Arabia (1st title)
- Runners-up: Jordan
- Third place: Syria
- Fourth place: Iraq

Tournament statistics
- Matches played: 16
- Goals scored: 40 (2.5 per match)
- Top scorer: (Saudi Arabia) Muhannad Barah (3 goals)
- Best goalkeeper: (Saudi Arabia) Bilal Al-Dawa

2019 WAFF U-15 Championship was the seventh edition of the WAFF U-16 Championship, the international youth football championship organised by the West Asian Football Federation (WAFF) for the men's under-15 national teams of West Asia. It was held in Zarqa, Jordan from 1 to 11 July 2019. The draw of the competition was held on 9 June 2019.

Saudi Arabia won the championship title for the first time in its history after winning all its matches.

== Format ==
The groups winners of the three groups in the first round played in a single round-robin format, in order to determine the top three in the tournament. The second-placed teams played in the same way on the 4–6 positions, while the third-placed teams in their groups played on the 7–9 positions.

== Participating nations ==
All West Asian Federation teams entered the competition except Qatar, United Arab Emirates and Yemen.

Team	Appearance	Last appearance	Previous best performance
Bahrain	2nd	2009	Group stage (2009)
Iraq	7th	2018	Champions (2013, 2015)
Jordan	7th	2018	Third place (2007, 2013, 2018)
Kuwait	2nd	2009	Group stage (2009)
Lebanon	3rd	2007	Fourth place (2005)
Oman	1st	—N/a	—N/a
Palestine	5th	2015	Group stage (2005, 2009, 2013, 2015)
Saudi Arabia	2nd	2015	Runners-up (2015)
Syria	4th	2009	Champions (2007)

== Officials ==
Referees

- Mohammed Salman Al-Noori (Iraq)
- Mohammed Bunafoor (Bahrain)
- Mohammad Ghabayen (Jordan)
- Jamil Ramadan (Lebanon)
- Taher Bakkar (Syria)
- Faisal Al-Balawi (Saudi Arabia)
- Abdullah Jamali (Kuwait)
- (United Arab Emirates) Adel Al-Naqbi (UAE)
- Emad Bojeh (Palestine)
- Qassim Al-Hatmi (Oman)

Assistant Referees

- Ahmed Sabah Al-Baghadi (Iraq)
- Salman Tlasi (Bahrain)
- Hamza Saadeh (Jordan)
- Mohammad Rammal (Lebanon)
- Rami Taan (Syria)
- Faisal Al-Qahtani (Saudi Arabia)
- Sayed Ali (Kuwait)
- (United Arab Emirates) Zayed Dawood Kamal (UAE)
- Ashraf Abuzubaida (Palestine)

== First round ==
=== Group A ===
Pos	Team	Pld	W	D	L	GF	GA	GD	Pts	Qualification
1	Syria	2	1	1	0	2	1	+1	4	Final stage
2	Bahrain	2	1	1	0	2	1	+1	4	
3	Lebanon	2	0	0	2	0	2	−2	0	

Source: WAFF
1 July 2019
16:00

Syria	1–0	Lebanon
Kassem 80'	Report

Prince Mohammed Stadium, Zarqa
Referee: Mohammad Shebeeb (Iraq)

3 July 2019
16:00

Syria	1–1	Bahrain
Alsarakbi 21'	Report	Alhaja 86' (o.g.)

Prince Mohammed Stadium, Zarqa
Referee: Abdullah Jamali (Kuwait)

5 July 2019
16:00

Lebanon	0–1	Bahrain
	Report	Albadawi 12'

Prince Mohammed Stadium, Zarqa
Referee: Emad Bojeh (Palestine)

=== Group B ===
Pos	Team	Pld	W	D	L	GF	GA	GD	Pts	Qualification
1	Jordan	2	2	0	0	6	1	+5	6	Final stage
2	Oman	2	0	1	1	1	3	−2	1	
3	Palestine	2	0	1	1	2	5	−3	1	

Source: WAFF
1 July 2019
19:00

Oman	0–2	Jordan
	Report	Azazmeh 67'; Marar 84'

Prince Mohammed Stadium, Zarqa
Referee: Jamil Ramadan (Lebanon)

3 July 2019
19:00

Palestine	1–1	Oman
Awayssa 90+5'	Report	Alrawahi 13'

Prince Mohammed Stadium, Zarqa
Referee: Faisal Al-Balawi (Saudi Arabia)

5 July 2019
19:00

Jordan	4–1	Palestine
Al-Refai 12'; Obeidat 18'; Al-Alem 37'; Mohammad 52'	Report	Shreiteh 21'

Prince Mohammed Stadium, Zarqa
Referee: Taher Bakkar (Syria)

=== Group C ===
Pos	Team	Pld	W	D	L	GF	GA	GD	Pts	Qualification
1	Saudi Arabia	2	2	0	0	7	1	+6	6	Final stage
2	Iraq	2	0	1	1	0	1	−1	1	
3	Kuwait	2	0	1	1	1	6	−5	1	

Source: WAFF
1 July 2019
22:00

Iraq	0–1	Saudi Arabia
	Report	Barrah 14'

Prince Mohammed Stadium, Zarqa
Referee: Mohammad Ghabayen (Jordan)

3 July 2019
22:00

Kuwait	0–0	Iraq
	Report

Prince Mohammed Stadium, Zarqa
Referee: Mohammad Bonfour (Bahrain)

5 July 2019
22:00

Saudi Arabia	6–1	Kuwait
Barrah 3', 20'; Al-Aliwa 6'; Majrashi 37'; Bin Hibah 49'; Alabdrbalnab 51'	Report	Alrashidi 90'

Prince Mohammed Stadium, Zarqa
Referee: Qassim Al-Hatmi (Oman)

== Second round ==
=== 7th–9th classification ===
Pos	Team	Pld	W	D	L	GF	GA	GD	Pts
1	Kuwait	2	2	0	0	4	1	+3	6
2	Lebanon	2	1	0	1	3	3	0	3
3	Palestine	2	0	0	2	1	4	−3	0

Source: WAFF
7 July 2019
22:00

Kuwait	2–1	Lebanon
Alheleeli 21'; Alsulaili 39'	Report	Alkandari 90+2' (o.g.)

Prince Mohammed Stadium, Zarqa
Referee: Mohammed Shabeeb (Iraq)

9 July 2019
22:00

Palestine	0–2	Kuwait
	Report	Alheleeli 61'; Alsulaili 73'

Prince Mohammed Stadium, Zarqa
Referee: Mohammad Bonfour (Bahrain)

11 July 2019
22:30

Lebanon	2–1	Palestine
Nasserddine 54'; Al Awad 79'	Report	Shreiteh 23'

Prince Mohammed Stadium, Zarqa
Referee: Faisal Al-Balawi (Saudi Arabia)

=== 4th–6th classification ===
Pos	Team	Pld	W	D	L	GF	GA	GD	Pts
1	Iraq	2	1	1	0	3	1	+2	4
2	Oman	2	0	2	0	1	1	0	2
3	Bahrain	2	0	1	1	2	4	−2	1

Source: WAFF
7 July 2019
19:00

Iraq	3–1	Bahrain
Rahem 49'; Neamah 66'; Kadhim 86'	Report	Tarada 72'

Prince Mohammed Stadium, Zarqa
Referee: Abdullah Jamali (Kuwait)

9 July 2019
19:00

Oman	0–0	Iraq
	Report

Prince Mohammed Stadium, Zarqa
Referee: Taher Bakkar (Syria)

11 July 2019
19:30

Bahrain	1–1	Oman
Helal 86'	Report	Alruzaiqi 90+4'

Prince Mohammed Stadium, Zarqa
Referee: Mohammad Mofeed (Jordan)

=== Final stage ===
Pos	Team	Pld	W	D	L	GF	GA	GD	Pts
1	Saudi Arabia	2	2	0	0	6	1	+5	6
2	Jordan	2	1	0	1	3	4	−1	3
3	Syria	2	0	0	2	1	5	−4	0

Source: WAFF
7 July 2019
16:00

Saudi Arabia	3–0	Syria
Ayyash 14'; Bernawi 63'; Al-Mutairi 89'	Report

Prince Mohammed Stadium, Zarqa
Referee: Adel Alnaqbi (Oman)

9 July 2019
16:00

Jordan	1–3	Saudi Arabia
Al-Refai 23'	Report	Bernawi 34'; Al-Aliwa 55'; Abdulraoof 63'

Prince Mohammed Stadium, Zarqa
Referee: Qassim Al Hatemi (Oman)

11 July 2019
16:00

Syria	1–2	Jordan
Samarah 38' (o.g.)	Report	Al-Alem 9', 70'

Prince Mohammed Stadium, Zarqa
Referee: Adel Al-Naqbi (United Arab Emirates)

== Champion ==
2019 WAFF U-16 Championship champion

Saudi Arabia
First title

== Final standing ==
Rank	Team
1st place, gold medalist(s)	Saudi Arabia
2nd place, silver medalist(s)	Jordan
3rd place, bronze medalist(s)	Syria
4	Iraq
5	Oman
6	Bahrain
7	Kuwait
8	Lebanon
9	Palestine
