= Palestine national under-17 football team =

Youth association football team

Palestine Under-17
- Nickname: الفدائيون (The Fedayeen)
- Association: Palestinian Football Association
- Confederation: AFC (Asia)
- Head coach: Muhammad Al-Shurbaji
- FIFA code: PLE
First colours	Second colours

First international
- Palestine 0–6 Kuwait (Muscat, Oman; 20 July 1998)

Biggest win
- Maldives 0–5 Palestine (Malé, Maldives; 30 October 2026); Guam 0–5 Palestine (Kuala Lumpur, Malaysia; 11 November 2026)

Biggest defeat
- Oman 11–0 Palestine (Muscat, Oman; 24 July 1998)

FIFA U-17 World Cup
- Appearances: 0

AFC U-17 Asian Cup
- Appearances: 0

The Palestine national under-17 football team, represents Palestine in association football at an under-17 age level and is controlled by the Palestinian Football Association, the governing body for football in Palestine. The team has yet to qualify for either the FIFA U-17 World Cup or the AFC U-17 Asian Cup.

== Competition history ==
=== FIFA U-17 World Cup Championship record ===
Year	Round	Position	GP	W	D*	L	GS	GA
(China) 1985	Did not enter							
(Canada) 1987	Did not enter							
(Scotland) 1989	Did not enter							
(Italy) 1991	Did not enter							
(Japan) 1993	Did not enter							
(Ecuador) 1995	Did not enter							
(Egypt) 1997	Did not enter							
(New Zealand) 1999	Did not enter							
(Trinidad and Tobago) 2001	Did not enter							
(Finland) 2003	Did not qualify							
(Peru) 2005	Did not qualify							
(South Korea) 2007	Did not qualify							
(Nigeria) 2009	Did not qualify							
(Mexico) 2011	Did not qualify							
(United Arab Emirates) 2013	Did not qualify							
(Chile) 2015	Did not qualify							
(India) 2017	Did not qualify							
(Brazil) 2019	Did not qualify							
(Peru) 2023	Did not qualify							
(Qatar) 2025	Did not qualify							
(Qatar) 2026	Did not qualify							
(Qatar) 2027	Did not qualify							
Total	0/20	–	0	0	0	0	0	0

=== AFC U-17 Asian Cup record ===
AFC U-17 Asian Cup record										AFC U-17 Asian Cup qualification record						
Year	Round	Pld	W	D	L	GF	GA	GD		Pld	W	D	L	GF	GA	GD
(Qatar) 1985	Did not enter									Did not enter						
(Qatar) 1986	Did not enter									Did not enter						
(Thailand) 1988	Did not enter									Did not enter						
(United Arab Emirates) 1990	Did not enter									Did not enter						
(Saudi Arabia) 1992	Did not enter									Did not enter						
(Qatar) 1994	Did not enter									Did not enter						
(Thailand) 1996	Did not enter									Did not enter						
(Qatar) 1998	Did not qualify									3	0	0	3	1	20	−19
(Vietnam) 2000	Did not enter									Did not enter						
(United Arab Emirates) 2002	Did not qualify									3	0	0	3	3	8	−5
(Japan) 2004	Did not qualify									2	0	0	2	0	10	−10
(Singapore) 2006	Did not qualify									2	0	0	2	0	5	−5
(Uzbekistan) 2008 (Note: It was proven after the qualifiers that group opponents Bangladesh and Tajikistan had fielded overaged players. Tajikistan was disqualified from the final tournament and fined, and Bangladesh was also fined. Although Article 26 (f) of the tournament regulations mandates that the guilty member association forfeits the match, the AFC did not announce a revised table for the group.)	Did not qualify									5	0	1	4	4	26	−22
(Uzbekistan) 2010	Did not qualify									5	1	0	4	3	17	−14
(Iran) 2012	Did not qualify									4	1	0	3	2	15	−13
(Thailand) 2014	Did not qualify									2	0	0	2	1	12	−11
(India) 2016	Did not qualify									3	1	0	2	3	8	−5
(Malaysia) 2018	Did not qualify									3	1	0	2	2	8	−6
(Bahrain) 2020	Did not qualify									3	2	0	1	8	3	+5
(Thailand) 2023	Did not qualify									4	1	0	3	7	10	−6
(Saudi Arabia) 2025	Did not qualify									3	1	0	2	2	7	−5
(Saudi Arabia) 2026	Did not qualify									4	1	2	1	6	6	0
(Uzbekistan) 2027	Did not qualify									4	3	0	1	11	6	+5
Total	–	–	–	–	–	–	–	–	–	50	12	3	35	53	159	−106

=== Arab Cup U-17 ===
Arab Cup U-17 record
Host nation(s) and year	Round	Pos	Pld	W	D	L	GF	GA	Squad
(Saudi Arabia) 2011	Group stage	8th of 8	3	0	0	3	1	12	–
(Tunisia) 2012	Did not participate								
(Qatar) 2014	Group stage	7th of 7	3	0	0	3	0	9	–
(Morocco) 2021	Cancelled								
(Algeria) 2022	Group stage	14th of 16	3	0	1	2	0	8	–
Total	Best: Group stage	3/4	9	0	1	8	1	29	–

=== WAFF U-16 Championship ===
WAFF U-16 Championship record
Host nation(s) and year	Round	Pos	Pld	W	D	L	GF	GA	Squad
(Iran) 2005	Group stage	6th of 6	2	0	0	2	0	17	–
(Syria) 2007	Did not enter								
(Jordan) 2009	Group stage	7th of 9	2	0	1	1	2	4	–
(Palestine) 2013	Group stage	5th of 5	4	0	1	3	2	10	–
(Jordan) 2015	Group stage	4th of 5	4	1	0	3	3	10	–
(Jordan) 2018	Did not enter								
(Jordan) 2019	7th-9th place round	9th of 9	4	0	1	3	3	9	–
(Saudi Arabia) 2021	Group stage	8th of 9	2	0	0	2	0	8	
(Jordan) 2022	Group stage	7th of 8	3	0	0	3	1	5	–
(Oman) 2023	Did not enter								
(Jordan) 2024	Semi-finals	4th of 9	3	1	1	1	5	3	–
(Jordan) 2025	Group stage	7th of 7	2	0	0	2	2	5	–
(Jordan) 2026	Group stage	5th of 7	3	0	1	2	1	4	–
Total		10/13	29	2	5	22	19	75	–

== Results and fixtures ==
22 November 2025 2026 U-17 Asian Cup qualification	Palestine	1–1	India	Ahmedabad, India
19:30 UTC+5:30				Stadium: EKA Arena

24 November 2025 2026 U-17 Asian Cup qualification	Lebanon	1–1	Palestine	Ahmedabad, India
19:30 UTC+5:30				Stadium: EKA Arena

28 November 2025 2026 U-17 Asian Cup qualification	Palestine	1–3	Iran	Ahmedabad, India
16:30 UTC+5:30				Stadium: EKA Arena

30 November 2025 2026 U-17 Asian Cup qualification	Chinese Taipei	1–3	Palestine	Ahmedabad, India
16:30 UTC+5:30				Stadium: EKA Arena

23 September 2026 Friendly	Jordan	3–0	Palestine	Aqaba, Jordan
				Stadium: Al-Aqaba Stadium

26 September 2026 2026 WAFF U-17 Championship	Yemen	2–0	Palestine	Aqaba, Jordan
17:00 UTC+3	Farea 6'; AlKum 80' (o.g.)			Stadium: Al-Aqaba Stadium

28 September 2026 2026 WAFF U-17 Championship	Palestine	0–1	Lebanon	Aqaba, Jordan
17:00 UTC+3			Farchoukh 14' (pen.)	Stadium: Al-Aqaba Stadium

30 September 2026 2026 WAFF U-17 Championship	Syria	1–1	Palestine	Aqaba, Jordan
20:00 UTC+3				Stadium: Al-Aqaba Stadium

30 October 2026 Friendly	Maldives	0–5	Palestine	Malé, Maldives
				Stadium: National Football Stadium

2 November 2026 Friendly	Maldives	0–3	Palestine	Malé, Maldives
				Stadium: National Football Stadium

8 November 2026 2027 U-17 Asian Cup qualification	Palestine	2–0	Malaysia	Kuala Lumpur, Malaysia
21:00 UTC+8	Khalifah 16'; Alexander 51'	Report		Stadium: Kuala Lumpur Stadium; Referee: Ko Min-gook (South Korea)

11 November 2026 2027 U-17 Asian Cup qualification	Guam	0–5	Palestine	Kuala Lumpur, Malaysia
15:30 UTC+8		Report	Khalifah 2'; Jamhour 7'; Badarne 28'; Abumarneh 31'; Abouatiq 66'	Stadium: Kuala Lumpur Stadium; Referee: Mario Cheung Wai Lung (Hong Kong)

17 November 2026 2027 U-17 Asian Cup qualification	Palestine	1–4	India	Kuala Lumpur, Malaysia
15:30 UTC+8	Khalifah 33' (pen.)	Report	Doungel 7'; Ningthoujam 51'; Gangte 58'; Lalhunmawia 88'	Stadium: Kuala Lumpur Stadium; Referee: Ko Min-gook (South Korea)

20 November 2026 2027 U-17 Asian Cup qualification	Singapore	2–3	Palestine	Kuala Lumpur, Malaysia
15:30 UTC+8	A. Irfan 2'; I. Farid 90+3'	Report	Abou-Atiq 29'; Hariri 40'; Sharifeh 48'	Stadium: Kuala Lumpur Stadium; Referee: Abdullah Zarban (Saudi Arabia)

== Players ==
=== Current Squad ===
The following 23 players were selected for the 2026 AFC U-17 Asian Cup qualification.

No.	Pos.	Player	Date of birth (age)	Club
1	GK	Hamza Fahid Sobhieh	13 August 2009 (age 17)	(Norwegian Football Federation) Stabæk
16	GK	Rayan Al-Torok	1 April 2011 (age 15)	(Royal Spanish Football Federation) Granada
22	GK	Naseeb Ahmad Sarsour	8 August 2010 (age 16)	(United States Soccer Federation) Virginia Union
3	DF	Kamal Hasan	31 March 2010 (age 16)	(Palestinian Football Association) Joseph Blatter Academy
4	DF	Ahmad Hamadna (captain)	26 March 2009 (age 17)	(Palestinian Football Association) Joseph Blatter Academy
5	DF	Talal Ahmad	1 January 2009 (age 17)	(Lebanese Football Association) Riyadi Abbasiyah
15	DF	Jameel Khair	19 April 2009 (age 17)	(Palestinian Football Association) Orthodoxi Beit Sahour
12	DF	Mohammad Thabet	5 October 2009 (age 17)	(Palestinian Football Association) Shaqba Academy
17	DF	Saleem Arzeqat		(Palestinian Football Association) Ahli Al-Khaleel
2	DF	Ahmad Abou Lebde	16 December 2009 (age 16)	(Danish Football Association) Næsby BK
18	DF	Mustafa Al-Kabra	20 March 2009 (age 17)	(Norwegian Football Federation) Lillestrøm
6	MF	Mohammad Jamhour	22 April 2010 (age 16)	(United States Soccer Federation) Inter Miami
14	MF	Amin El-Haj	22 June 2009 (age 17)	(German Football Association) Berliner AK 07
8	MF	Adam Amireh	29 October 2010 (age 16)	(United States Soccer Federation) Charlotte FC
13	MF	Omar Jaber		(Palestinian Football Association) Mamoun Al-Khateeb
19	MF	Jamal Obeid	17 August 2009 (age 17)	(Palestinian Football Association) Thaqafi Tulkarm
10	MF	Zayn Al-Ghazawi	18 December 2009 (age 16)	(French Football Federation) Le Havre
7	FW	Osaid Anaya	27 April 2009 (age 17)	(Palestinian Football Association) Master Coach Academy
21	FW	Amin Idriss	31 March 2009 (age 17)	(Lebanese Football Association) Tadamon Sour
11	FW	Adam Kafafi	17 June 2009 (age 17)	(United Arab Emirates Football Association) Shabab Al Ahli
20	FW	Mohee Hasasneh	10 January 2009 (age 17)	(Palestinian Football Association) Shabab Al Ubeidiya
9	FW	Yazan Khalefah	19 February 2010 (age 16)	(Palestinian Football Association) Hilal Al-Quds
23	FW	Amir Jomah	28 June 2009 (age 17)	(Swedish Football Association) Vasalunds IF

== Competetive head-to-head ==
Opponent	Pld	W	D	L	GF	GA	GD	Win %	Last
Afghanistan	1	1	0	0	3	0	+3	100.00	2019
Algeria	1	0	0	1	0	5	−5	0.00	2022
Bahrain	3	1	0	2	6	6	+0	33.33	2024
Bangladesh	1	1	0	0	2	0	+2	100.00	2011
Bhutan	1	1	0	0	2	1	+1	100.00	2009
Chinese Taipei	2	2	0	0	5	1	+4	100.00	2025
Guam	2	2	0	0	9	0	+9	100.00	2026
Indonesia	1	0	0	1	0	2	−2	0.00	2022
India	3	0	1	2	2	8	−6	0.00	2026
Iran	4	0	0	4	2	19	−17	0.00	2025
Iraq	8	0	0	8	1	34	−33	0.00	2024
Jordan	6	1	2	3	5	10	−5	16.67	2025
Kuwait	5	0	0	5	2	13	−11	0.00	2022
Lebanon	4	0	1	3	2	6	−4	0.00	2026
Malaysia	2	1	0	1	2	4	−2	50.00	2026
Maldives	2	2	0	0	7	1	+6	100.00	2019
Nepal	1	1	0	0	2	1	+1	100.00	2017
Turkmenistan	2	0	1	1	2	4	−2	0.00	2007
Oman	4	0	1	3	1	22	−21	0.00	2019
Qatar	2	0	0	2	0	5	−5	0.00	2011
Saudi Arabia	4	0	0	4	1	16	−15	0.00	2024
Singapore	1	1	0	0	3	2	+1	100.00	2026
Sudan	2	0	0	2	0	5	−5	0.00	2022
Syria	7	0	2	5	5	28	−23	0.00	2026
Yemen	5	0	0	5	1	13	−12	0.00	2026
United Arab Emirates	6	0	1	5	6	19	−13	0.00	2022
Uzbekistan	4	0	0	4	1	24	−23	0.00	2024
Total	0	0	0	0	0	0	+0	—	

== See also ==
- Palestine national football team
- Palestine national under-23 football team
- Palestine national under-20 football team
- Palestine women's national football team
- Football in Palestine
