= Jordan national under-17 football team =

National association football team

Jordan U-17
- Nickname(s): النشامى (The Chivalrous)
- Association: Jordan Football Association
- Confederation: AFC (Asia)
- Sub-confederation: WAFF (West Asia)
- Head coach: Ashraf Shatat
- FIFA code: JOR
First colours	Second colours

AFC U-17 Asian Cup
- Appearances: 3 (first in 1990)
- Best result: Quarter-finals (2010)

The Jordan national under-17 football team (Arabic: منتخب الأردن تحت 17 سنة لكرة القدم) is the national under-17 football team of Jordan and is controlled by the Jordan Football Association. The team also serves as the national under-16 and national under-15 football teams of Jordan.

While the team is yet to qualify for both the FIFA U-17 World Cup, they have played in the AFC U-17 Asian Cup three times, reaching the quarter-finals of the 2010 edition. They also participate in the WAFF U-16 Championship.

== Competitive records ==
=== FIFA U-17 World Cup ===
FIFA U-17 World Cup finals record
Year	Result	Position	GP	W	D	L	GF	GA
(China) 1985	Did not enter							
(Canada) 1987	Did not qualify							
(Scotland) 1989	Did not qualify							
(Italy) 1991	Did not qualify							
(Japan) 1993	Did not qualify							
(Ecuador) 1995	Did not qualify							
(Egypt) 1997	Did not qualify							
(New Zealand) 1999	Did not qualify							
(Trinidad and Tobago) 2001	Did not qualify							
(Finland) 2003	Did not qualify							
(Peru) 2005	Did not qualify							
(South Korea) 2007	Did not qualify							
(Nigeria) 2009	Did not qualify							
(Mexico) 2011	Did not qualify							
(United Arab Emirates) 2013	Did not qualify							
(Chile) 2015	Did not qualify							
(India) 2017	Did not qualify							
(Brazil) 2019	Did not qualify							
(Peru) ~~2021~~	Cancelled due to the COVID-19 pandemic							
(Indonesia) 2023	Did not qualify							
(Qatar) 2025	Did not qualify							
(Qatar) 2026	Did not qualify							
(Qatar) 2027	To be determined							
Total	–	0/21	0	0	0	0	0	0

=== AFC U-16 Championship/AFC U-17 Asian Cup ===
AFC U-17 Asian Cup Record
Hosts / Year	Result	Position	GP	W	D*	L	GS	GA
(Qatar) 1985	Did not enter	-	-	-	-	-	-	-
(Qatar) 1986 − (Thailand) 1988	Did not qualify	-	-	-	-	-	-	-
(United Arab Emirates) 1990	Qualified	Group stage	3	0	0	3	1	9
(Saudi Arabia) 1992 − (Uzbekistan) 2008	Did not qualify	-	-	-	-	-	-	-
(Uzbekistan) 2010	Qualified	Quarterfinals	4	1	2	1	2	5
(Iran) 2012	Withdrew	-	-	-	-	-	-	-
(Thailand) 2014 − (India) 2016	Did not qualify	-	-	-	-	-	-	-
(Malaysia) 2018	Qualified	Group stage	3	0	2	1	5	9
(Bahrain) ~~2020~~	Cancelled due to the COVID-19 pandemic	-	-	-	-	-	-	-
(Thailand) 2023	Did not qualify	-	-	-	-	-	-	-
(Saudi Arabia) 2025	Did not qualify	-	-	-	-	-	-	-
(Uzbekistan) 2027	Did not qualify	-	-	-	-	-	-	-

=== WAFF U-17 Championship ===
WAFF U-17 Championship Record
Hosts / Year	Result	GP	W	D*	L	GS	GA
(Iran) 2005	Group stage	2	0	1	1	1	8
(Syria) 2007	Third place	4	1	2	1	3	8
(Jordan) 2009	Fourth place	4	1	1	2	4	7
(Palestine) 2013	Third place	3	0	1	2	3	8
(Jordan) 2015	Fifth place	4	0	1	3	2	9
(Jordan) 2018	Third place	4	2	0	2	11	9
(Jordan) 2019	Runners-up	4	3	0	1	9	5
(Saudi Arabia) 2021	Group stage	2	1	0	1	5	3
(Jordan) 2022	Champions	5	4	0	1	5	3
(Oman) 2023	Group Stage	3	1	1	1	3	3
(Jordan) 2024	Semi-finals	3	2	1	0	5	1
(Jordan) 2025	Semi-finals	3	1	1	1	2	2
(Jordan) 2026	Semi-finals	3	1	2	0	3	1

=== Arab U-17 and U-15 Championships ===
- 2009 Arab U-17 Championship: (3rd place)
- 2011 Arab U-15 Championship: (withdrew)
- 2012 Arab U-17 Championship: (withdrew)

=== International Cups/Friendly Tournaments ===
- 2013 U-16 Caspian Cup
- 2014 IAST Friendly Cup (Winner)

=== FIFA U-15 World Cup & Festival ===
FIFA U-15 World Cup & Festival record
Year	Host	Result
2026	Azerbaijan	118th place

== Results and fixtures ==
The following is a list of match results in the last 12 months, as well as any future matches that have been scheduled.

Win Draw Loss Fixture

=== Under-17 ===
==== 2025 ====
22 November 2026 U-17 Asian Cup qualification Group E	Bhutan	0–5	Jordan	Aqaba, Jordan
16:00		Report	Al-Jawhari 7'; Al-Rabie 42'; Al-Malahi 65'; Abu Saad 89'; Bakkar 90+3'	Stadium: Al-Aqaba Stadium

24 November 2026 U-17 Asian Cup qualification Group E	Jordan	0–1	Australia	Aqaba, Jordan
16:00		Report	Court 54'	Stadium: Al-Aqaba Stadium

26 November 2026 U-17 Asian Cup qualification Group E	Iraq	2–2	Jordan	Aqaba, Jordan
16:00	Hayder 51' (pen.); Altalebi 75'	Report	Al-Rabie 46'; Al-Malahi 85'	Stadium: Al-Aqaba Stadium

30 November 2026 U-17 Asian Cup qualification Group E	Jordan	6–1	Philippines	Aqaba, Jordan
16:00	Al-Jawhari 21'; Abu Dehim 43', 70'; Abu Saad 73'; Al-Malahi 74', 90+2'	Report	Long 86'	Stadium: Al-Aqaba Stadium

==== 2026 ====
6 September Friendly	Tunisia	1–1	Jordan	Hammam-Lif, Tunisia
16:00 UTC+1	Betayb 33' (pen.)	Report	Al-Hourani 85'	Stadium: Bou Kornine Stadium

12 September Friendly	Tunisia	4–1	Jordan	Hammam-Lif, Tunisia
16:30 UTC+1	Kahmeri; Hassan; Abdelbaki	Report	Al-Hourani 36'	Stadium: Bou Kornine Stadium

22 September Friendly	Jordan	3–0	Palestine	Aqaba, Jordan
17:00 UTC+3	Abu Sheikha 10'; Al-Hourani 41'; Al-Fawadleh 70'	Report		Stadium: Al-Aqaba Stadium

27 September 2026 WAFF U-17 Championship GS	Jordan	3–1	Oman	Aqaba, Jordan
18:00 UTC+3	Al-Hourani 31', 73'; Al-Issa 81'	Report (WAFF) Report (JFA)	Al Shamsi 5'	Stadium: Al-Aqaba Stadium

1 October 2026 WAFF U-17 Championship GS	Jordan	0–0	United Arab Emirates	Aqaba, Jordan
18:00 UTC+3		Report (WAFF) Report (JFA)		Stadium: Al-Aqaba Stadium

3 October 2026 WAFF U-17 Championship SF	Jordan	0–0 (1–3 p)	Lebanon	Aqaba, Jordan
20:00 UTC+3		Report (WAFF) Report (JFA)		Stadium: Al-Aqaba Stadium
	Penalties
	Al-Fawadleh (penalty missed); Al-Riyahneh (penalty missed); Qadadeh (penalty scored); Abu Sheikha (penalty missed)		Madi (penalty scored); Kammouni (penalty scored); El Barouk (penalty scored); Messelmani (penalty missed)

29 October Friendly	Jordan	2–0	Bangladesh	As-Salt, Jordan
16:00 UTC+3	Abu Sheikha 18'; Al-Sa'asa 73'	Report		Stadium: Al-Salt Stadium

2 November Friendly	Jordan	3–2	Bangladesh	As-Salt, Jordan
13:00 UTC+3	Al-Hourani 8', 11'; Zaki 14'		Goal	Stadium: Al-Salt Stadium

8 November 2027 AFC U-17 Asian Cup qualification	Jordan	2–0	Laos	Vientiane, Laos
19:00 UTC+7	Al-Hourani 11', 90+1'	Report (AFC) Report (JFA)		Stadium: New Laos National Stadium; Referee: Bader Bujamhoor (United Arab Emirates)

11 November 2027 AFC U-17 Asian Cup qualification	Sri Lanka	0–10	Jordan	Vientiane, Laos
19:00 UTC+7		Report	F. Al Rawashdeh 17'; Al-Hourani 27', 58', 70'; J. J. J. Aleassa 48'; Y. Abu Sheikha 55'; K. Al Sa’sa 75', 86', 90'; F. Abu Zema 90+3'	Stadium: New Laos National Stadium; Referee: Ahmed Al-Kalbani (Oman)

17 November 2027 AFC U-17 Asian Cup qualification	Jordan	0–3	Iran	Vientiane, Laos
16:00 UTC+7		Report	Naderi 33'; Zarei 36'; Jannatalipor 58'	Stadium: New Laos National Stadium; Referee: Yoshito Nakagawa (Japan)

20 November 2027 AFC U-17 Asian Cup qualification	Pakistan	v	Jordan	Vientiane, Laos
16:00 UTC+7				Stadium: New Laos National Stadium

=== Under-15 ===
==== 2026 ====
25 March Friendly	Russia	2–1	Jordan	Antalya, Türkiye
15:30 UTC+3	Lukyanov 70', 83'	Report	Al-Asal 27'	Stadium: Manavgat Atatürk Stadyumu

30 March Friendly	Russia	2–1	Jordan	Antalya, Türkiye
16:00 UTC+3	Torini 55' (pen.); Koledov 81'	Report	Al-Sa'asa 41'	Stadium: Manavgat Atatürk Stadyumu

17 October Friendly	Jordan	2–1	Palestine	Amman, Jordan
09:00 UTC+3		Report		Stadium: Polo Stadium

17 October Friendly	Jordan	2–2	Palestine	Amman, Jordan
11:00 UTC+3		Report		Stadium: Polo Stadium

17 October Friendly	Jordan	2–0	Palestine	Amman, Jordan
16:00 UTC+3		Report		Stadium: Polo Stadium

19 October Friendly	Jordan	0–0	Palestine	Amman, Jordan
09:00 UTC+3		Report		Stadium: Polo Stadium

24 October 2026 U-15 World Cup & Festival Group AD	Cyprus	2–1	Jordan	Baku, Azerbaijan
14:30 UTC+4	5'; 13'		22'	Stadium: Hovsan Competition Complex Pitch 2B

25 October 2026 U-15 World Cup & Festival Group AD	Nigeria	2–2	Jordan	Baku, Azerbaijan
12:45 UTC+4				Stadium: Hovsan Competition Complex Pitch 7B

25 October 2026 U-15 World Cup & Festival Group AD	Jordan	0–1	South Sudan	Baku, Azerbaijan
19:30 UTC+4				Stadium: Hovsan Competition Complex Pitch 7B

26 October 2026 U-15 World Cup & Festival Group AD	Jordan	1–1	Pakistan	Baku, Azerbaijan
11:30 UTC+4				Stadium: Hovsan Competition Complex Pitch 5B

26 October 2026 U-15 World Cup & Festival Group AD	Gambia	2–3	Jordan	Baku, Azerbaijan
18:15 UTC+4				Stadium: Hovsan Competition Complex Pitch 8B

28 October 2026 U-15 World Cup & Festival 97th–128th Round of 32	Jordan	1–3	Cape Verde	Baku, Azerbaijan
18:15 UTC+4				Stadium: Hovsan Competition Complex Pitch 1A

28 October 2026 U-15 World Cup & Festival 113th–128th Round of 16	Jordan	1–1 (4–2 p)	Togo	Baku, Azerbaijan
18:15 UTC+4				Stadium: Hovsan Competition Complex Pitch 1A

29 October 2026 U-15 World Cup & Festival 113th–120th quarter-finals	Syria	3–1	Jordan	Baku, Azerbaijan
				Stadium: Hovsan Competition Complex Pitch 5A

29 October 2026 U-15 World Cup & Festival 117th–120th semi-finals	Jordan	3–2	Mauritius	Baku, Azerbaijan
				Stadium: Hovsan Competition Complex Pitch 6A

30 October 2026 U-15 World Cup & Festival 117th-place match	Jordan	0–2	Bermuda	Baku, Azerbaijan
				Stadium: Hovsan Competition Complex Pitch 10A

== Current Coaching Staff ==
Managing Director	(Tunisia) Abdelhay Ben Soltane
Head coach	(Jordan) Ashraf Shatat
Assistant coach	(Jordan)
Goalkeeping coach	(Jordan)
Team doctor	(Jordan)

== Coaching History ==
- (England) Colwyn Rowe (2004-2006)
- (Jordan) Walid Fatafta (2009-2010)
- (England) Jonathan William Hill (2010)
- (United States) Bibert Kaghado (2011-2012)
- (Jordan) Adnan Awad (2013)
- (Jordan) Abdallah El-Qutati (2015-2016)
- (Jordan) Islam Al-Diabat (2016)
- (Jordan) Abdallah El-Qutati (2016-2018)
- (Jordan) Khalil Fatafta (2018-2019)
- (Jordan) Othman Al-Hasanat (2021)
- (Jordan) Amjad Abu Taima (2021)
- (Jordan) Abdallah El-Qutati (2022-2024)
- (Jordan) Khaled Saad (2024-2025)
- (Jordan) Ashraf Shatat (2026-)

== Players ==
=== Current squad ===
The following 23 players were called-up for the 2027 AFC U-17 Asian Cup qualification, held in Vientiane between 8 and 20 November.

No.	Pos.	Player	Date of birth (age)	Caps	Club
1	GK	Karam Al-Najjar			(Jordan) Shabab Al-Ordon
12	GK	Saif Atmeh			(Jordan) Amman FC
22	GK	Abdallah Hamad			(Jordan) Inglizia
2	DF	Ahmed Bani Yassin			Jordan Knights
3	DF	Fayez Al-Rawashdeh			(Jordan) Amman FC
4	DF	Ibrahim Mohammad Al-Fawadleh			(Jordan) Al-Khader Soccer Academy
5	DF	Obada Ibrahim Bassam Al-Riyahneh			Jordan Knights
13	DF	Ibrahim Abu Hajar			(Jordan) Al-Yazan Academy
15	DF	Jameel Dyabat Al-Issa			(Jordan) Al-Yazan Academy
18	DF	Faris Abu Zema	2010 (age 15–16)		(Jordan) Inglizia
21	DF	Hashem Al-Khateeb			(Jordan) Al-Ramtha
6	MF	Abdulhamid Al-Badayna			(Jordan) Al-Faisaly
8	MF	Mohanad Al-Asal			(Jordan) Al-Hussein
10	MF	Yazan Qadadeh	2010 (age 15–16)		(Jordan) Inglizia
11	MF	Mohammed Ahmed Zaki			(Jordan) Al-Khader Soccer Academy
16	MF	Aws Laith Emsaytif	14 September 2010 (age 16)		(United Arab Emirates) Al-Nasr
19	MF	Khaled Al-Sa'asa			(Jordan) Al-Yazan Academy
23	MF	Usaid Al-Adwan			Jordan Knights
7	FW	Yousef Abu Sheikha			Jordan Knights
9	FW	Faisal Al-Hourani	2010 (age 15–16)		(Jordan) Inglizia
14	FW	Ahmad Tamare Abu Dayyah			(Jordan) Al-Wehdat
17	FW	Abdulrahman Al-Baba	2010 (age 15–16)		(Jordan) Inglizia
20	FW	Musa Al-Dajani			Jordan Knights

=== Recent call-ups ===
The following players have previously been called up to the Jordan under-17 squad and remain eligible.

Pos.	Player	Date of birth (age)	Caps	Goals	Club	Latest call-up
FW	Hashem Aqel			-	(Jordan) Al-Khader Soccer Academy	v. Lebanon, 3 October 2026
FW	Abdulkarim Hanoush Al-Fayez			-	(Jordan) Inglizia	v. Lebanon, 3 October 2026
MF	Wassim Al-Harbawi			-	(Jordan) Inglizia	v. Lebanon, 3 October 2026
MF	Aws Ayman Al-Ajoulin			-	(Jordan) Al-Jazeera	v. Tunisia, 12 September 2026
FW	Majd Al-Amoush			-	(Jordan) Al-Jazeera	v. Tunisia, 12 September 2026
DF	Mohammad Abu Safiyeh			-	(Jordan) Inglizia	v. Russia, 30 March 2026
MF	Jamal Ismail			-	Jordan Knights	v. Russia, 30 March 2026
	Yanal Nedal Jaber			-	(Jordan) Al-Wehdat	v. Russia, 30 March 2026

=== Under-15 squad ===
The following 14 players were called-up for a set of friendlies against Palestine on October 17 and 19, as well as for the 2026 FIFA U-15 World Cup & Festival.

Manager: Mohamed Abdel-Raouf

No.	Pos.	Player	Date of birth (age)	Caps	Club
	GK	Mohamed Al-Said			(Jordan) Al-Wehdat
	GK	Kenan Hamouda			(Jordan) Inglizia
		Abdulrahman Khierallah			(Jordan) Al-Khader Academy
		Ameer Al-Zoubi			(Jordan) Al-Ramtha
		Ayham Al-Aridi			(Jordan) Al-Khader Academy
		Hashem Abdulhalim			Jordan Knights
		Khaled Al-Khalidi			Jordan Knights
		Laith Seria			Jordan Knights
		Majd Abu Judeh			(Jordan) Inglizia
		Waleed Al-Zoubi			(Jordan) Al-Dardour Academy
		Wesam Khlawi			(Jordan) Al-Jazeera
		Ziad Diabat			(Jordan) Al-Wefaq Academy
		Jamal Alkhraishah			(Jordan) IRIS International Sports Academy
		Zeineddin Abu Al-Shaar			(Jordan) Al-Ahli

== Head-to-head record ==
The following table shows Jordan's head-to-head record in the AFC U-17 Asian Cup.

Opponent	Pld	W	D	L	GF	GA	GD	Win %
China	1	0	0	1	0	3	−3	0.00
India	1	0	0	1	0	1	−1	0.00
Indonesia	1	1	0	0	1	0	+1	100.00
North Korea	2	0	1	1	2	6	−4	0.00
Oman	1	0	1	0	2	2	+0	0.00
Tajikistan	1	0	1	0	1	1	+0	0.00
United Arab Emirates	1	0	0	1	1	5	−4	0.00
Uzbekistan	1	0	1	0	0	0	+0	0.00
Yemen	1	0	0	1	1	5	−4	0.00
Total	10	1	4	5	8	23	−15	10.00

== See also ==
- Jordan national football team
- Jordan national under-23 football team
- Jordan national under-20 football team
- Jordan women's national football team
