= India national under-17 football team =

National association football team

India U-17
- Nickname: The Blue Colts
- Association: All India Football Federation
- Confederation: AFC (Asia)
- Sub-confederation: SAFF (South Asia)
- Head coach: Mehrajuddin Wadoo
- Captain: Dallalmoun Gangte
- FIFA code: IND
First colours	Second colours

First international
- China 2–1 India (Bangkok, Thailand; 20 August 1984)

Biggest win
- India 13–0 Macau (Bangkok, Thailand; 27 August 1984); India 13–0 Brunei (Chonburi, Thailand; 23 October 2024)

Biggest defeat
- Russia 8–0 India (St. Petersburg, Russia; 8 January 2017)

World Cup
- Appearances: 1 (first in 2017)
- Best result: Group stage (2017)

Asian Cup
- Appearances: 11 (first in 1990)
- Best result: Quarter-final (2002, 2018)

SAFF Championship
- Appearances: 10 (first in 2011)
- Best result: Champions (2013, 2017, 2019, 2022, 2023, 2024, 2025)

WAFF Championship (as guests)
- Appearances: 1 (first in 2018)
- Best result: Runners-up (2018)
Medal record
SAFF Championship
Gold medal – first place	2013 Nepal
Gold medal – first place	2017 Nepal
Gold medal – first place	2019 India
Gold medal – first place	2022 Sri Lanka
Gold medal – first place	2023 Bhutan
Gold medal – first place	2024 Bhutan
Gold medal – first place	2025 Sri Lanka
Silver medal – second place	2011 Nepal
Silver medal – second place	2015 Bangladesh
Bronze medal – third place	2018 Nepal
WAFF Championship
Silver medal – second place	2018 Jordan

The India national under-17 football team represents India in international football at the under-17 level. Controlled by the All India Football Federation, the governing body for football in India, the team is part of the Asian Football Confederation and the South Asian Football Federation.

== History ==
=== FIFA U-17 World Cup ===
India participated for the first time in FIFA U-17 World Cup as hosts in the 2017 edition of the tournament. This was the first time ever, and as of 2025 the only time, that a team representing India would participate in the finals of a FIFA organized world tournament. India was placed in group A along with, United States, Ghana and Columbia. On 6 October 2017, India played their first ever match in FIFA-U17 World Cup history against United States in front of 47,000 spectators. India lost the match by 3–0. India played their Second match against Colombia. Although India lost 1–2, in the 82nd minute Jeakson Singh Thounaojam became the first Indian goalscorer in a FIFA tournament. In the third match of group stage, India faced Ghana where they lost 4–0, finishing bottom of the group A. India also failed to qualify for 2019 edition when they lost by 1–0 in the quarterfinal match against South Korea at the 2018 AFC U-16 Championship.

=== AFC U-17 Asian Cup ===
The AFC U-16 Championship is the top level tournament for under-16 football teams in Asia and began in 1985. India participated in the tournament for the first time in 1990. They were knocked-out of the tournament in the group stage, finishing third in their four-team group with one against Jordan. The team qualified again for the tournament in 1996 where they finished last in their group which included Bahrain, China, Iran, and Thailand. The team lost three of their four matches, with their sole victory coming against China.

India qualified again for the tournament in 2002, where they reached the quarter-final round, in their best result to date. The team took on South Korea in the quarter-finals but lost 3–1, and thus failed to advance further. Following the 2002 tournament, India qualified for the next tournament in Japan. Two defeats and one victory in the group stage saw India finish third in their group, and were knocked out from the tournament.

After failing to qualify for 2006 AFC U-17 Championship, India qualified for the 2008 edition. Two defeats before a sole victory over Indonesia saw India once again make it no further than the group stage. The same result followed in 2012, only this time with no wins in the group stage.

India, for the seventh time, participated in the tournament in 2016 with the nation hosting the tournament. Despite home advantage, India once again could not make it beyond the group stage and finished last in their group which consisted of themselves, Iran, Saudi Arabia, and United Arab Emirates.

India qualified for 2018 AFC U-16 Championship by participating in the qualification round. India defeated Palestine, 3–0, then played a 2–2 draw against Nepal and finally qualified for the 2018 edition when they played a goalless draw against the defending champion Iraq. India played its group stage matches against Vietnam, Iran and Indonesia at the 2018 edition in Malaysia. They defeated Vietnam by 1–0, then held Iran to a goal less draw and finally qualified for the knock out stages by holding Indonesia to a 0–0 draw. In the quarter finals they were defeated 1–0 by heavy weights South Korea, ending their run in the tournament.

India has also qualified for the 2020 AFC U-16 Championship by participating in the qualifying round. In the first game they defeated Turkmenistan 5–0. In the second game also they defeated Bahrain by an identical score line. They finally qualified for the finals by holding Uzbekistan to a 1–1 draw. India was clubbed with Korea Republic, Australia and Uzbekistan in Group C for the tournament. But the tournament was called of due to COVID-19.

India qualified for the 2023 AFC U-17 Asian Cup for third consecutive time. India defeated Maldives by 5–0, Kuwait by 3–0 and Myanmar by 4–1 but fell to Saudi Arabia by 1–2. India qualified as second placed best ranked teams making their 9th appearance in the tournament. In 2023, India was clubbed with Vietnam, Uzbekistan and Japan in group stage of 2023 AFC U-17 Asian Cup in Thailand. India began their Asian campaign with a draw with Vietnam by 1–1 with a spectacular long shot by Malemnganba Singh Thokchom but fell to Uzbekistan by a solitary goal. The team faced a huge defeat against Japan but have put a valiant performance scoring 4 goals, concluding by score of 8–4 ending their campaign with a draw and two losses.

After failing to qualify for the 2025 edition, India qualified for 2026 edition making their 10th appearance in the tournament. India tied with Palestine by 1–1, defeated Chinese Taipei by 3–1 but fell to Lebanon by 0–2, shrinking the hopes to qualify for the tournament until a win against Iran by 2–1 helped them to qualify back for the final tournament after missing the 2025 edition. India faced losses against Australia and Uzbekistan and missed the World Cup qualification. India made their second consecutive qualification to the 2027 tournament by winning the qualifiers.

=== SAFF U-17 Championship ===
In 2009, the SAFF U-16 Championship was launched. India participated in the first edition of the tournament in 2011. After an opening day surprise defeat to Pakistan, India qualified for the next round after defeating the Maldives 5–0. India then made it to the final, defeating Nepal on penalties, but again lost to Pakistan in the final 2–1. India fared much better in the 2013 edition, finishing first in their group of Bangladesh and Sri Lanka, before defeating Afghanistan in the semi-final on penalties. In the final, India defeated Nepal 1–0 to win the tournament for the first time.

As reigning champions, India entered the 2015 edition of the tournament with a 5–0 victory over Sri Lanka. India then suffered a 2–1 defeat to Bangladesh to finish second in the group, and but still qualified for the semi-finals. In the semi-finals, India once again defeated Nepal 1–0, but lost to Bangladesh in the final on penalties.

At the 2017 edition India entered into semi-final, defeating Maldives and Nepal by 9–0 and 2–1 respectively. In the semi-final they defeated Bhutan by 3–0 and entered to the final and faced Nepal again and defeated them by 2–1 to become SAFF champion for the second time after 2013.

2019 edition of the tournament was their third title. In this edition the tournament was played in round robin, thus India played against all other teams and managed to win all their matches without a goal conceded. In the final they faced Nepal whom they easily defeated by 7−0 margin, thus scoring 28 goals in 5 matches, becoming champions for the third time.

2022 edition was their fourth title. In this edition, India was clubbed with Bhutan and Nepal. India began their SAFF campaign with a comfortable 3–0 win over Bhutan but surprisingly lost to Nepal by 1–3. Though, India qualified for semi finals where they defeated Bangladesh by 1–2 score line. India again faced Nepal in the finals where now they defeated Nepal with 4–0.

At the 2023 edition India entered into semi-final, defeating Nepal and Bangladesh by the scoreline of 1–0 in both games. In the semi-final they defeated Maldives by 8–0 and entered to the final and faced Bangladesh. India defeated them by 2–0 to become SAFF champion for the fifth time.

2024 edition turned out to be another title for them. India entered the semi finals by defeating Bangladesh and Maldives by 1–0 and 3–0 in both group games. In the semi-finals, they thrashed Nepal by score line of 4–2 and entered the final facing Bangladesh once again. India defeated them by 2–0 and won the title for sixth time.

2025 was another year when India defended their title for seventh time defeating Maldives, Bhutan and Pakistan in group stage. By defeating Nepal by 3–0, the team met Bangladesh in the finals, which led to a 2–2 draw, resulting in a penalty-shootout, in which India sealed a victory.

=== AIFF Youth Cup ===
The AIFF Youth Cup was first competed for in 2016. It was organized by the All India Football Federation (AIFF) as a preparatory tournament for the India under-17 team for the 2016 AFC U-16 Championship and the 2017 FIFA U-17 World Cup. The first tournament was held from 15 May to 25 May 2016 at the Tilak Maidan Stadium in Vasco, Goa. A total of five teams participated in the tournament after being invited by the All India Football Federation. The final was won 2–1 by South Korea over the United States.

== Recent results and fixtures ==
For past match results of the under-17 team, see the results in Indian football seasons.

Matches in the last 12 months, and future scheduled matches

Legend

Win Draw Loss Fixture

=== 2025 ===
22 November 2025 2026 AFC U17 ACQ	Palestine	1–1	India	Ahmedabad, India
19:30	Jomah 74'	Report	Poonia 45'	Stadium: EKA Arena

26 November 2025 2026 AFC U17 ACQ	India	3–1	Chinese Taipei	Ahmedabad, India
19:30	Gangte 32', 77', 79'	Report	Yang Hao-wei 4'	Stadium: EKA Arena; Referee: Mohamed Rashid Ismail (UAE)

28 November 2025 2026 AFC U17 ACQ	India	0–2	Lebanon	Ahmedabad, India
19:00 IST		Report	Assaf 26'; Maakaroun 38'	Stadium: EKA Arena; Referee: Wissam Rabie (Syria)

30 November 2025 2026 AFC U17 ACQ	Iran	1–2	India	Ahmedabad, India
	Valipoor 19'	Report	Gangte 45+1' (pen.); Wangkheirakpam 52'	Stadium: EKA Arena

=== 2026 ===
29 January 2026 Friendly	India	4–2	Tajikistan	Margao, India
16:00 IST	Gangte 8'; Wangkhem 48'; ?? 75' (o.g.); Ngangom 90+1'	Report	Odilzoda 18'; Sattorov 66'	Stadium: Jawaharlal Nehru Stadium

1 February 2026 Friendly	India	0–0	Tajikistan	Margao, India
16:00 IST		Report		Stadium: Jawaharlal Nehru Stadium

10 February 2026 Friendly	Turkey	1–0	India	Manavgat, Turkey
14:30 IST	Erdoğan 12' (pen.)	Report		Stadium: Emirhan Sports Center

12 February 2026 Friendly	Turkey	6–1	India	Manavgat, Turkey
14:30 IST	Seçil 7'; Fettahoğlu 14' (pen.); Ekici 20', 28'; Sayar 30'; Tuncel 85'	Report	Wangkhem 47'	Stadium: Emirhan Sports Center

15 February 2026 Hybrid Friendly	India	4–2	(Russia) Spartak Moscow U17	Serik, Turkey
	Ningthoujam 31'; Wangkheirakpam 57'; Ngangom 61'; Aimaan 82'	Report	?? 65'; ?? 86' (pen.)	Stadium: Fanatic Tour Serik Sport Center

3 March 2026 Friendly	Myanmar	1–2	India	Yangon, Myanmar
05:45 IST	Ko Ko 54'	Report	Ngangom 11'; Wangkheirakpam 24'	Stadium: Thuwunna Stadium; Referee: Khin Maung Soe (Myanmar)

5 March 2026 Friendly	Myanmar	0–0	India	Yangon, Myanmar
05:00 IST		Report		Stadium: Thuwunna Stadium; Referee: Thura Zaw (Myanmar)

25 March 2026 Friendly	Thailand	2–2	India	Lopburi, Thailand
17:30 IST	39', 86'	Report	Wangkheirakpam 22'; Wangkhem 67'	Stadium: Phra Ramesuan Stadium

28 March 2026 Friendly	India	3–0	Indonesia	Lopburi, Thailand
17:30 IST	Ngangom 17'; Wangkheirakpam 20', 58'	Report		Stadium: Phra Ramesuan Stadium

31 March 2026 Friendly	India	1–2	South Korea	Lopburi, Thailand
15:30 IST	Wangkheirakpam 32'	Report	5', 82'	Stadium: Phra Ramesuan Stadium

17 April 2026 Friendly	India	1–0	United Arab Emirates	Samut Prakan, Thailand
16:30 IST	Shah 27'	Report		Stadium: Windmill Football Club

21 April 2026 Friendly	India	1–5	United Arab Emirates	Samut Prakan, Thailand
16:30 IST	Gangte 89'	Report		Stadium: Windmill Football Club

25 April 2026 Friendly	Qatar	1–1	India	Doha, Qatar
21:30 IST	? 82'	Report	Wangkhem 67'	Stadium: Hamad bin Khalifa Stadium

28 April 2026 Friendly	Qatar	0–0	India	Doha, Qatar
21:30 IST		Report		Stadium: Hamad bin Khalifa Stadium

6 May 2026 2026 AFC U17 GS	Australia	4–0	India	Jeddah, Saudi Arabia
21:30 IST	Becvinovski 4'; Court 29' (pen.); Demuth 74'; Oliveira 86'	Report		Stadium: King Abdullah Sports City Training Stadium (Pitch C); Attendance: 72; Referee: Lothar D'hondt (Belgium)

10 May 2026 2026 AFC U17 GS	India	0–3	Uzbekistan	Jeddah, Saudi Arabia
22:30 IST		Report	Abduraimov 32' (pen.); Singh 60' (o.g.); Ravshanbekov 78'	Stadium: King Abdullah Sports City Hall Stadium; Attendance: 58; Referee: Abdullah Al-Shehri (Saudi Arabia)

13 May 2026 2026 AFC U17 GS	North Korea	Cancelled (Note: North Korea withdrew due to concerns related to the 2026 Iran war, leaving the tournament at 15 teams.)	India	Jeddah, Saudi Arabia
21:30 IST				Stadium: King Abdullah Sports City Training Stadium (Pitch C)

4 October 2026 Friendly	Myanmar	1–1	India	Thanlyin, Myanmar
15:30 MST	Aung Myat Thar 42'	Report	Dallalmoun Gangte 73' (pen.)	Stadium: StarCity Sports Club Ground

7 October 2026 Friendly	Myanmar	0–4	India	Thanlyin, Myanmar
15:30 MST		Report	Dallalmoun Gangte 40'; Kyi Thar 53' (o.g.); Kamgouhao Doungel 60'; Hrishikesh Charan Manavathi 72'	Stadium: StarCity Sports Club Ground

1 November 2026 Friendly	United Arab Emirates	0–0	India	Ras Al Khaimah, United Arab Emirates
20:30 IST				Stadium: Emirates Football Club Stadium

4 November 2026 Friendly	United Arab Emirates	1–4	India	Ras Al Khaimah, United Arab Emirates
20:30 IST	Jayden Adetiba	Report	Kamgouhao Doungel; Md Sahir Ali; Hrishikesh Manavathi; Ristik Maity	Stadium: Saud bin Saqr Al Qasimi Stadium

11 November 2026 2027 AFC U17 ACQ	Singapore	2–4	India	Kuala Lumpur, Malaysia
21:00 UTC+8	Izzan 26', 64'	Report	Gangte 29', 61' (pen.), 82'; Maity 88'	Stadium: Kuala Lumpur Stadium; Referee: Dan Ning (China)

14 November 2026 2027 AFC U17 ACQ	India	12–0	Guam	Kuala Lumpur, Malaysia
15:30 UTC+8	Thongbam 5'; Gangte 13', 27', 32'; Manavathi 20'; Irom 53'; Wahengbam 55', 73', 84', 85'; Saikhom 56'; Maity 87'	Report		Stadium: Kuala Lumpur Stadium; Referee: Lin Te-en (Chinese Taipei)

17 November 2026 2027 AFC U17 ACQ	Palestine	1–4	India	Kuala Lumpur, Malaysia
15:30 UTC+8	Khalifah 33' (pen.)	Report	Doungel 7'; Ningthoujam 51'; Gangte 58'; Lalhunmawia 88'	Stadium: Kuala Lumpur Stadium; Referee: Ko Min-gook (South Korea)

20 November 2026 2027 AFC U17 ACQ	India	0–0	Malaysia	Kuala Lumpur, Malaysia
21:00 UTC+8		Report		Stadium: Kuala Lumpur Stadium; Referee: Mario Cheung Wai Lung (Hong Kong)

== Team staff ==
As of September 2026

Position	Name
Head coach	(India) Mehrajuddin Wadoo
Assistant coach	(India) Sachin Badadhe
Goalkeeping coach	(India) Rajat Guha
Strength & Conditioning coach	(India) Manish Malik
Physiotherapist	(India) Askar PV
Team manager	(India) Shubham Gurung
Performance analyst	(India) Ashish Rana
Team doctor	(India) Sudheesh Pillai
Media officer	(India) Akhil Rawat

== Players ==
=== Current squad ===
The following players were called up for the 2027 AFC U-17 Asian Cup qualifiers.

Caps and goals are correct as of 20 November 2026, after the match against Malaysia.

No.	Pos.	Player	Date of birth (age)	Caps	Goals	Club
	GK	Arnav Pandhare		1	0	(All India Football Federation) RFYC
	GK	Maroof Shafi		6	0	(All India Football Federation) AIFF Academy
	GK	Newton Irengbam		0	0	(All India Football Federation) SC Delhi
	DF	Lawmsangzuala Sangnuntluanga	5 October 2010 (age 16)	6	0	(All India Football Federation) NorthEast United
	DF	Leo Thongbam	10 October 2010 (age 16)	6	1	(All India Football Federation) NorthEast United
	DF	Malem Laishram	10 August 2010 (age 16)	3	0	(All India Football Federation) Sudeva Delhi
	DF	Malsawmtluanga Lalbiakngura	25 February 2010 (age 16)	2	0	(All India Football Federation) FC Madras
	DF	Maldino Singh Yumnam		3	0	(All India Football Federation) AIFF Academy
	DF	Zoramdinthara Lalhunmawia	25 June 2010 (age 16)	6	2	(All India Football Federation) Punjab
	DF	Jinesh Thoudam	13 March 2010 (age 16)	1	0	(All India Football Federation) FC Madras
	DF	Sailex Oinam	23 March 2010 (age 16)	3	0	(All India Football Federation) Minerva Academy
	MF	Dallalmuon Gangte	11 July 2010 (age 16)	23	20	(All India Football Federation) NorthEast United
	MF	Henthoiba Keisam	10 December 2010 (age 15)	2	0	(All India Football Federation) NorthEast United
	MF	David Mangang Irom		3	1	(All India Football Federation) Classic FA
	MF	Mukundo Singh Ningthoujam	23 February 2010 (age 16)	7	1	(All India Football Federation) Sudeva Delhi
	MF	R. Lawmsangzuala		5	0	(All India Football Federation) Punjab
	MF	Sambay Thiyam		2	0	(All India Football Federation) Bengaluru
	FW	Hrishikesh Charan Manavathi	23 October 2010 (age 16)	6	2	(All India Football Federation) Bengaluru
	FW	Kamgouhao Doungel		5	2	(All India Football Federation) SC Delhi
	FW	Md Sahir Ali		5	0	(All India Football Federation) Sudeva Delhi
	FW	Ristik Maity		3	2	(All India Football Federation) RFYC
	FW	Raj Singh Wahengbam	15 July 2010 (age 16)	4	4	(All India Football Federation) Minerva Academy
	FW	Felix Meitei Saikhom		3	1	(All India Football Federation) AIFF Academy

=== Recent call-ups ===
The following footballers were part of a national selection in the past twelve months, but are not part of the current squad.

Pos.	Player	Date of birth (age)	Caps	Goals	Club	Latest call-up
GK	Alok Nishad	5 March 2009 (age 17)	1	0	(India) Sreenidi Deccan	2026 AFC U-17 Asian Cup
GK	Manashjyoti Baruah	10 January 2009 (age 17)	5	0	(India) RFYC	2026 AFC U-17 Asian Cup
GK	Rajrup Sarkar	12 August 2009 (age 17)	9	0	(India) Zinc FA	2026 AFC U-17 Asian Cup
DF	Abhishek Kumar Mondal	25 May 2010 (age 16)	5	1	(India) Mohun Bagan SG	Myanmar, October 2026
DF	Indra Rana Magar	4 November 2009 (age 17)	9	0	(India) RFYC	2026 AFC U-17 Asian Cup
DF	Korou Meitei Konthoujam	30 March 2009 (age 17)	14	0	(India) Classic FA	2026 AFC U-17 Asian Cup
DF	Lesvin Rebelo	3 July 2009 (age 17)	7	0	(India) Goa	2026 AFC U-17 Asian Cup
DF	Md Aimaan Bin	16 March 2009 (age 17)	14	0	(India) Sudeva Delhi	2026 AFC U-17 Asian Cup
DF	Shubham Poonia	3 December 2009 (age 16)	15	1	(India) NorthEast United	2026 AFC U-17 Asian Cup
MF	Denny Singh Wangkhem	1 September 2009 (age 17)	17	4	(India) FC Mangalore	2026 AFC U-17 Asian Cup
MF	Diamond Singh Thokchom	13 June 2010 (age 16)	11	1	(India) SC Delhi	2026 AFC U-17 Asian Cup
MF	Moosa Ashiq Sofi	17 July 2009 (age 17)	6	0	(India) Minerva Academy	2026 AFC U-17 Asian Cup
MF	Nitishkumar Meitei Yengkhom	8 June 2009 (age 17)	2	0	(India) Chennaiyin	2026 AFC U-17 Asian Cup
FW	Jasmeet Singh		0	0	(India) Punjab	Myanmar, October 2026
FW	Rahan Ahmed	19 July 2010 (age 16)	14	2	(India) AIFF Academy	Myanmar, October 2026
FW	Adil Aman A.	2 March 2009 (age 17)	3	0	(India) FC Madras	2026 AFC U-17 Asian Cup
FW	Azlaan Shah KH	5 May 2008 (age 18)	18	4	(India) Minerva Academy	2026 AFC U-17 Asian Cup
FW	Gunleiba Wangkheirakpam	11 September 2009 (age 17)	15	10	(India) NorthEast United	2026 AFC U-17 Asian Cup
FW	Heeranganba Seram	3 March 2009 (age 17)	6	0	(India) Jamshedpur	2026 AFC U-17 Asian Cup
FW	Washington Singh Ngangom	9 August 2009 (age 17)	6	3	(India) Classic FA	2026 AFC U-17 Asian Cup
FW	Yuvraj Kadam	17 March 2009 (age 17)	6	0	(India) SAI RC	2026 AFC U-17 Asian Cup
^{PRE} Preliminary squad / standby

== Competitive record ==
Red border indicates the team played as the host of the tournament.

*Denotes draws includes knockout matches decided on penalty kicks. Red border indicates that the tournament was hosted on home soil. Gold, silver, bronze backgrounds indicates 1st, 2nd and 3rd finishes respectively. Bold text indicates best finish in tournament.

=== FIFA U-17 World Cup ===
FIFA U-17 World Cup record
Year	Result	Position	Pld	W	D*	L	GF	GA	GD
(China) 1985 to (Chile) 2015	Did not qualify								
(India) 2017	Group stage	24th	3	0	0	3	1	9	−8
(Brazil) 2019	Did not qualify								
(Indonesia) 2023	Did not qualify								
(Qatar) 2025	Did not qualify								
(Qatar) 2026	Did not qualify								
Total: 1/21	Group stage	24th	3	0	0	3	1	9	−8

FIFA U-17 World Cup History
Year	Round	Score	Result
2017	Round 1	India **0–3** United States	Loss
2017	Round 1	India **1–2** Colombia	Loss
2017	Round 1	India **0–4** Ghana	Loss

=== AFC U-17 Asian Cup ===
AFC U-17 Asian Cup record										Qualification record							
Host/Year	Result	Position	Pld	W	D*	L	GF	GA	GD	Pld	W	D*	L	GF	GA	GD	Ref
(Qatar) 1985	Did not qualify									4	1	1	2	15	5	+10	
(Qatar) 1986	Did not qualify									1	0	0	1	0	4	-4	
(Thailand) 1988	Did not qualify									4	1	1	2	5	8	-3	
(United Arab Emirates) 1990	Group stage	5th	3	1	0	2	2	6	−4	2	1	0	1	3	3	0	
(Saudi Arabia) 1992	Did not qualify									4	2	0	2	9	4	+5	
(Qatar) 1994	Did not qualify									2	0	1	1	1	3	-2	
(Thailand) 1996	Group stage	9th	4	1	0	3	6	16	−10	—N/a	—N/a	—N/a	—N/a	—N/a	—N/a	—N/a	
(Qatar) 1998	Did not qualify									3	1	1	1	6	1	+5	
(Vietnam) 2000	Did not qualify									3	2	0	1	9	1	+8	
(United Arab Emirates) 2002	**Quarter-finals**	6th	4	1	1	2	7	9	−2	2	2	0	0	12	0	+12	
(Japan) 2004	Group stage	10th	3	1	0	2	3	4	−1	2	1	1	0	5	1	+4	
(Singapore) 2006	Did not qualify									2	1	0	1	11	3	+8	
(Uzbekistan) 2008	Group stage	12th	3	1	0	2	3	8	−5	5	4	1	0	18	2	+16	
(Uzbekistan) 2010	Did not qualify									5	1	1	3	6	15	-9	
(Iran) 2012	Group stage	13th	3	0	2	1	4	5	−1	4	3	0	1	13	11	+2	
(Thailand) 2014	Did not qualify									4	1	1	2	10	5	+5	
(India) 2016	Group stage	13th	3	0	1	2	5	9	−4	3	2	0	1	11	3	+8	
(Malaysia) 2018	**Quarter-finals**	7th	4	1	2	1	1	1	0	3	1	2	0	5	2	+3	
(Bahrain) 2020	Qualified but cancelled									3	2	1	0	11	1	+10	–
(Thailand) 2023	Group stage	12th	3	0	1	2	5	10	−5	4	3	0	1	13	3	+10	
(Saudi Arabia) 2025	Did not qualify									3	2	0	1	16	3	+13	
(Saudi Arabia) 2026	Group stage	12th	2	0	0	2	0	7	-7	4	2	1	1	6	5	+1	
(Uzbekistan) 2027	Qualified									4	3	1	0	20	3	+17	
Total: 11/22	Quarter-finals	5th	32	6	7	19	36	75	−36	71	36	13	22	205	86	+119	–

AFC U-17 Asian Cup Finals History
Year	Round	Score	Result
1990	Group A	India **0–3** United Arab Emirates	Loss
1990	Group A	India **1–3** China	Loss
1990	Group A	India **1–0** Jordan	Win
1996	Group B	India **0–7** Thailand	Loss
1996	Group B	India **2–3** Bahrain	Loss
1996	Group B	India **1–4** Iran	Loss
1996	Group B	India **3–2** China	Win
2002	Group A	India **1–4** China	Loss
2002	Group A	India **4–1** Myanmar	Win
2002	Group A	India **1–1** United Arab Emirates	Draw
2002	Quarterfinals	India **1–3** South Korea	Loss
2004	Group C	India **0–1** Iran	Loss
2004	Group C	India **1–2** Kuwait	Loss
2004	Group C	India **2–1** Malaysia	Win
2008	Group B	India **2–5** South Korea	Loss
2008	Group B	India **0–3** Syria	Loss
2008	Group B	India **1–0** Indonesia	Win
2012	Group D	India **2–3** Uzbekistan	Loss
2012	Group D	India **0–0** Syria	Draw
2012	Group D	India **2–2** China	Draw
2016	Group A	India **2–3** United Arab Emirates	Loss
2016	Group A	India **3–3** Saudi Arabia	Draw
2016	Group A	India **0–3** Iran	Loss
2018	Group C	India **1–0** Vietnam	Win
2018	Group C	India **0–0** Iran	Draw
2018	Group C	India **0–0** Indonesia	Draw
2018	Quarterfinals	India **0–1** South Korea	Loss
2023	Group D	India **1–1** Vietnam	Draw
2023	Group D	India **0–1** Uzbekistan	Loss
2023	Group D	India **4–8** Japan	Loss
2026	Group D	India **0–4 Australia**	Loss
2026	Group D	India **0–3 Uzbekistan**	Loss

AFC U-17 Asian Cup Qualification History
Year	Round	Score	Result
1985	Group 2A	India **1–2** China	Loss
1985	Group 2A	India **0–2** Kuwait	Loss
1985	Group 2A	India **1–1** Yemen	Draw
1985	Group 2A	India **13–0** Macau	Win
1986	Group 4	India **0–4** Burma	Loss
1988	Group 3	India **1–1** Bangladesh	Draw
1988	Group 3	India **4–0** Nepal	Win
1988	Group 3	India **0–2** China	Loss
1988	Group 3	India **0–5** Thailand	Loss
1990	Group 4	India **1–2** Nepal	Loss
1990	Group 4	India **2–1** Nepal	Win
1992	Group 3	India **1–2** Nepal	Loss
1992	Group 3	India **2–0** Pakistan	Win
1992	Group 3	India **6–0** Maldives	Win
1992	Group 3	India **0–2** Bangladesh	Loss
1994	Group 3	India **0–0** Iran	Draw
1994	Group 3	India **1–3** Bahrain	Loss
1998	Group 4	India **0–1** North Korea	Loss
1998	Group 4	India **6–0** Kazakhstan	Win
1998	Group 4	India **0–0** Pakistan	Draw
2000	Group 4	India **6–0** Pakistan	Win
2000	Group 4	India **3–0** Sri Lanka	Win
2000	Group 4	India **0–1** Bangladesh	Loss
2002	Group 4	India **10–0** Maldives	Win
2002	Group 4	India **2–0** Maldives	Win
2004	Group 6	India **1–1** Nepal	Draw
2004	Group 6	India **4–0** Afghanistan	Win
2006	Group G	India **9–0** Pakistan	Win
2006	Group G	India **2–3** Tajikistan	Loss
2008	Group C	India **6–0** Sri Lanka	Win
2008	Group C	India **2–2** Iraq	Draw
2008	Group C	India **3–0** Lebanon	Win
2008	Group C	India **3–0** Saudi Arabia	Win
2008	Group C	India **4–0** Bhutan	Win
2010	Group D	India **1–6** Jordan	Loss
2010	Group D	India **2–1** Turkmenistan	Win
2010	Group D	India **0–0** Kyrgyzstan	Draw
2010	Group D	India **0–2** Oman	Loss
2010	Group D	India **3–6** United Arab Emirates	Loss
2014	Group A	India **1–1** Tajikistan	Draw
2014	Group A	India **0–1** Lebanon	Loss
2014	Group A	India **8–1** Bhutan	Win
2014	Group A	India **1–2** Kuwait	Loss
2016	Group E	India **5–0** Bahrain	Win
2016	Group E	India **0–3** Iran	Loss
2016	Group E	India **6–0** Lebanon	Win
2018	Group D	India **3–0** Palestine	Win
2018	Group D	India **2–2** Nepal	Draw
2018	Group D	India **0–0** Iraq	Draw
2020	Group B	India **5–0** Turkmenistan	Win
2020	Group B	India **5–0** Bahrain	Win
2020	Group B	India **1–1** Uzbekistan	Draw
2023	Group D	India **5–0** Maldives	Win
2023	Group D	India **3–0** Kuwait	Win
2023	Group D	India **4–1** Myanmar	Win
2023	Group D	India **1–2** Saudi Arabia	Loss
2025	Group D	India **13–0** Brunei	Win
2025	Group D	India **1–0** Turkmenistan	Win
2025	Group D	India **2–3** Thailand	Loss
2026	Group D	India **1–1** Palestine	Draw
2026	Group D	India **3–1** Chinese Taipei	Win
2026	Group D	India **0–2** Lebanon	Loss
2026	Group D	India **2–1** Iran	Win
2027	Group E	India **4–2** Singapore	Win
2027	Group E	India **12–0** Guam	Win
2027	Group E	India **4–1** Palestine	Win
2027	Group E	India **0–0** Malaysia	Draw

=== SAFF U-17 Championship ===
SAFF U-17 Championship record
Host/Year	Result	Position	Pld	W	D*	L	GF	GA	GD
(Nepal) 2011	Runners-up	2nd	4	1	1	2	7	4	+3
(Nepal) 2013	Champions	1st	4	3	1	0	7	1	+6
(Bangladesh) 2015	Runners-up	2nd	4	2	1	1	8	3	+5
(Nepal) 2017	Champions	1st	4	4	0	0	16	2	+14
(Nepal) 2018	Semi-Final	3rd	4	2	1	1	6	3	+3
(India) 2019	Champions	1st	5	5	0	0	28	0	+28
(Sri Lanka) 2022	Champions	1st	4	3	0	1	10	4	+6
(Bhutan) 2023	Champions	1st	4	4	0	0	12	0	+12
(Bhutan) 2024	Champions	1st	4	4	0	0	10	2	+8
(Sri Lanka) 2025	Champions	1st	5	4	1	0	15	4	+11
Total	10/10	7 Titles	42	32	5	5	119	23	+96

SAFF U-17 Championship History
Year	Round	Score	Result
2011	Group A	India **0–1** Pakistan	Loss
2011	Group A	India **5–0** Maldives	Win
2011	Semifinals	India **1–1** Nepal (4–2) P	Draw
2011	Final	India **1–2** Pakistan	Loss
2013	Group B	India **4–1** Sri Lanka	Win
2013	Group B	India **2–0** Bangladesh	Win
2013	Semifinals	India **0–0** Afghanistan (4–3) P	Draw
2013	Final	India **1–0** Nepal	Win
2015	Group A	India **5–0** Sri Lanka	Win
2015	Group A	India **1–2** Bangladesh	Loss
2015	Semifinals	India **1–0** Nepal	Win
2015	Final	India **1–1** Bangladesh (2–4) P	Draw
2017	Group B	India **9–0** Maldives	Win
2017	Group B	India **2–1** Nepal	Win
2017	Semifinals	India **3–0** Bhutan	Win
2017	Final	India **2–1** Nepal	Win
2018	Group B	India **1–2** Pakistan	Loss
2018	Group B	India **4–0** Bhutan	Win
2018	Semifinals	India **1–1** Bangladesh (2–4) P	Draw
2018	Third place	India **1–0** Nepal	Win
2019	Round Robin	India **5–0** Nepal	Win
2019	Round Robin	India **7–0** Bhutan	Win
2019	Round Robin	India **5–0** Sri Lanka	Win
2019	Round Robin	India **4–0** Bangladesh	Win
2019	Final	India **7–0** Nepal	Win
2022	Group B	India **3–0** Bhutan	Win
2022	Group B	India **1–3** Nepal	Loss
2022	Semifinals	India **2–1** Bangladesh	Win
2022	Final	India **4–0** Nepal	Win
2023	Group A	India **1–0** Bangladesh	Win
2023	Group A	India **1–0** Nepal	Win
2023	Semifinals	India **8–0** Maldives	Win
2023	Final	India **2–0** Bangladesh	Win
2024	Group A	India **1–0** Bangladesh	Win
2024	Group A	India **3–0** Maldives	Win
2024	Semifinals	India **4–2** Nepal	Win
2024	Final	India **2–0** Bangladesh	Win
2025	Group B	India **6–0** Maldives	Win
2025	Group B	India **1–0** Bhutan	Win
2025	Group B	India **3–2** Pakistan	Win
2025	Semifinals	India **3–0** Nepal	Win
2025	Final	India **2–2** Bangladesh (4–1) P	Draw

=== WAFF U-16 Championship ===
WAFF U-16 Championship record
Host/Year	Result	Position	Pld	W	D*	L	GF	GA	GD
(Jordan) 2018	**Runners-up**	2nd	4	3	0	1	9	2	+7

WAFF U-16 Championship History
Year	Round	Score	Result
2018	Round Robin	India **4–0** Jordan	Win
2018	Round Robin	India **1–2** Japan	Loss
2018	Round Robin	India **1–0** Iraq	Win
2018	Round Robin	India **3–0** Yemen	Win

== Overall competitive records ==
As of 20 November 2026 vs Malaysia (excluding friendlies & minor tournaments)

Competition	Pld	W	D	L	GF	GA	GD	Win%
FIFA U-17 World Cup	3	0	0	3	1	9	−8	0.00
AFC U-17 Asian Cup	32	6	7	19	36	75	−39	18.75
AFC U-17 Asian Cup Qualification	71	36	13	22	205	86	+119	50.70
SAFF U-17 Championship	42	32	5	5	120	23	+97	76.19
WAFF U-16 Championship	4	3	0	1	9	2	+7	75.00
Total	152	77	25	50	371	195	+176	50.66

== Head-to-head record ==
As of 20 November 2026 vs Malaysia (excluding friendlies & minor tournaments)

The following table shows India's head-to-head record in the official competitive tournaments of FIFA U-17 World Cup, AFC U-17 Asian Cup (including qualifiers), SAFF U-17 Championship and WAFF U-16 Championship.

Positive Record Neutral Record Negative Record

Opponent	Pld	W	D	L	GF	GA	GD	Win %
Afghanistan	2	1	1	0	4	0	+4	50.00
Australia	1	0	0	1	0	4	−4	0.00
Bhutan	7	7	0	0	30	1	+29	100.00
Bahrain	4	2	0	2	13	6	+7	50.00
Bangladesh	14	7	4	3	20	11	+9	50.00
Brunei	1	1	0	0	13	0	+13	100.00
China	6	1	1	4	8	15	−7	16.67
Chinese Taipei	1	1	0	0	3	1	+2	100.00
Colombia	1	0	0	1	1	2	−1	0.00
Ghana	1	0	0	1	0	4	−4	0.00
Guam	1	1	0	0	12	0	+12	100.00
Indonesia	2	1	1	0	1	0	+1	50.00
Iran	7	1	2	4	3	12	−9	14.29
Iraq	3	1	2	0	3	2	+1	33.33
Japan	2	0	0	2	5	10	−5	0.00
Jordan	3	2	0	1	6	6	+0	66.67
Kazakhstan	1	1	0	0	6	0	+6	100.00
Kuwait	4	1	0	3	5	6	−1	25.00
Kyrgyzstan	1	0	1	0	0	0	+0	0.00
Lebanon	4	2	0	2	9	3	+6	50.00
Macau	1	1	0	0	13	0	+13	100.00
Malaysia	2	1	1	0	2	1	+1	50.00
Maldives	9	9	0	0	54	0	+54	100.00
Myanmar	3	2	0	1	8	6	+2	66.67
Nepal	19	13	3	3	44	16	+28	68.42
North Korea	1	0	0	1	0	1	−1	0.00
Oman	1	0	0	1	0	2	−2	0.00
Pakistan	8	4	1	3	22	7	+15	50.00
Palestine	3	2	1	0	8	2	+6	66.67
Saudi Arabia	3	1	1	1	7	5	+2	33.33
Singapore	1	1	0	0	4	2	+2	100.00
South Korea	3	0	0	3	3	9	−6	0.00
Sri Lanka	5	5	0	0	23	1	+22	100.00
Syria	2	0	1	1	0	3	−3	0.00
Tajikistan	2	0	1	1	3	4	−1	0.00
Thailand	4	0	1	3	2	15	−13	0.00
Turkmenistan	3	3	0	0	8	1	+7	100.00
United Arab Emirates	4	0	1	3	6	13	−7	0.00
United States	1	0	0	1	0	3	−3	0.00
Uzbekistan	4	0	1	3	3	8	−5	0.00
Vietnam	2	1	1	0	2	1	+1	50.00
Yemen	2	1	1	0	4	1	+3	50.00
Total	152	77	25	50	371	195	+176	50.66

== See also ==
- Football in India
- India national football team
- India women's national football team
- India national under-23 football team
- India national under-20 football team
- Sport in India
- Football in India
