= Iran national under-17 football team =

National association football team

Iran U-17
- Nickname(s): Team Melli Nojavanan ("The New Youth National Team" or "The Teenage National Team")
- Association: FFIRI
- Confederation: AFC (Asia)
- Head coach: Armaghan Ahmadi
- Captain: Erfan Yousefzade
- FIFA code: IRN
First colours	Second colours

FIFA U-17 World Cup
- Appearances: 5 (first in 2001)
- Best result: Quarters finals (2017)

AFC U-17 Asian Cup
- Appearances: 14 (first in 1996)
- Best result: Champions (2008)

The Iran national under-17 football team, more commonly known as Nojavanan, is controlled by the Iran Football Federation and represents Iran in international under-17 football competitions.

== Tournament records ==
=== FIFA U-17 World Cup ===
Year	Round	M	W	D	L	GF	GA	GD
(China) 1985	Withdrew							
(Canada) 1987	Did not qualify							
(Scotland) 1989	Did not qualify							
(Italy) 1991	Did not qualify							
(Japan) 1993	Did not qualify							
(Ecuador) 1995	Did not qualify							
(Egypt) 1997	Did not qualify							
(New Zealand) 1999	Did not qualify							
(Trinidad and Tobago) 2001	Group stage	3	0	0	3	2	6	–4
(Finland) 2003	Suspended							
(Peru) 2005	Did not qualify							
(South Korea) 2007	Did not qualify							
(Nigeria) 2009	Round of 16	4	2	1	1	4	2	+2
(Mexico) 2011	Did not qualify							
(United Arab Emirates) 2013	Round of 16	4	1	2	1	4	6	–2
(Chile) 2015	Did not qualify							
(India) 2017	Quarter-finals	5	4	0	1	13	5	+8
(Brazil) 2019	Did not qualify							
(Indonesia) 2023	Round of 16	4	2	1	1	10	5	+5
(Qatar) 2025	Did not qualify							
(Qatar) 2026	Did not qualify							
(Qatar) 2027	To be determined							
(Qatar) 2028	To be determined							
(Qatar) 2029	To be determined							
Total	5/24	20	9	4	7	33	24	+9

=== AFC U-17 Asian Cup ===
AFC U-17 Championship record									Qualifications							
Year	Round	M	W	D	L	GF	GA	GD	M	W	D	L	GF	GA	GD	Link
(Qatar) 1985	Withdrew								Withdrew							Link
(Qatar) 1986	Did Not Qualify								-	-	-	-	-	-	-	Link
(Thailand) 1988	Did Not Qualify								-	-	-	-	-	-	-	Link
(United Arab Emirates) 1990	Did Not Qualify								-	-	-	-	-	-	-	Link
(Saudi Arabia) 1992	Did Not Qualify								3	0	1	2	3	5	+2	Link
(Qatar) 1994	Did Not Qualify								-	-	-	-	-	-	-	Link
(Thailand) 1996	Group Stage	4	1	0	3	5	8	-3	-	-	-	-	-	-	-	Link
(Qatar) 1998	Group Stage	4	0	0	4	1	11	-10	2	2	0	0	4	0	+4	Link
(Vietnam) 2000	Runners-up	6	5	0	1	16	3	+13	4	4	0	0	23	1	+22	Link
(United Arab Emirates) 2002	Suspended								Suspended							Link
(Japan) 2004	Fourth place	6	4	0	2	13	6	+7	2	2	0	0	8	4	+4	Link
(Singapore) 2006	Quarter-finals	4	1	2	1	3	3	0	2	2	0	0	10	2	+8	Link
(Uzbekistan) 2008	Champions	6	6	0	0	15	3	+12	4	4	0	0	17	0	+17	Link
(Uzbekistan) 2010	Group Stage	3	1	1	1	6	4	+2	4	3	1	0	9	0	+9	Link
(Iran) 2012	Semi-finals	5	4	0	1	16	7	+9	3	3	0	0	11	0	+11	Link
(Thailand) 2014	Quarter-finals	4	2	1	1	6	5	+1	3	3	0	0	13	0	+13	Link
(India) 2016	Runners-up	6	3	3	0	13	4	+9	3	3	0	0	12	1	+11	Link
(Malaysia) 2018	Group Stage	3	1	1	1	5	2	+3	4	4	0	0	15	1	+14	Link
(Bahrain) 2020	Qualified but later cancelled due to the COVID-19 pandemic								3	3	0	0	19	1	+18	Link
(Thailand) 2023	Semi-finals	5	2	2	1	8	4	+4	3	3	0	0	18	1	+17	Link
(Saudi Arabia) 2025	Group Stage	3	0	1	2	4	7	-3	4	3	0	1	13	7	+6	Link
(Saudi Arabia) 2026	Did Not Qualify								4	2	1	1	10	4	+6	Link
(Uzbekistan) 2027	Qualified								4	4	0	0	18	0	+18	Link
Total	13/21	59	30	11	18	111	67	+44	52	45	3	4	203	27	+176	_

- 2020 AFC U-16 Championship qualification - AFC awarded Iran a 3–0 win as a result of Afghanistan fielding two ineligible players. The original match results were Iran 4–0 Afghanistan.

=== WAFF U-16 Championship ===
WAFF U-16 Championship record
Year	Round	Pld	W	D	L	GS	GA
(Iran) 2005	Champions	4	3	1	0	17	1
(Syria) 2007	Runners-up	4	2	1	1	18	8
(Jordan) 2009	Champions	4	4	0	0	11	6
(Palestine) 2013	did not enter						
(Jordan) 2015	did not enter						
2018–Onward	Not WAFF member						
Total	3/7	12	9	2	1	46	15

*Red border color indicates tournament was held on home soil.

=== CAFA U-16 Championship ===
CAFA Youth Championship record
Year	Round	Pld	W	D	L	GS	GA
(Uzbekistan) 2018	did not enter						
(Tajikistan) 2019	Third Place	5	3	0	2	10	5
(Tajikistan) 2022	Champions	4	3	1	0	12	2
Total	2/3	9	6	1	2	22	7

=== U14 Asian Youth Games ===
Football at the Asian Youth Games
Year	Round	Pld	W	D	L	GS	GA
(Singapore) 2009	Third Place	6	5	0	1	18	4
(China) 2013	Runners-up	6	5	0	1	17	2
Total	2/2	12	10	0	2	35	6

=== FIFA U-15 World Cup & Festival ===
2026 FIFA U-15 World Cup & Festival - 38th 10 7 0 3 30 17 +13 21

== Results and fixtures ==
=== Previous matches ===
Win Draw Loss

Date	Venue	Opponent	Competition	Result	Iranian scorers	Report

=== 2026 ===
2027 AFC U-17 Asian Cup qualification

Iran 1-1 Thailand Friendly

Iran 3-1 Hong Kong Friendly

Iran - Pakistan

Iran - Sri Lanka

Iran - Jordan

Iran - Laos

== Coaching staff ==
Position	Name
Head coach	(Iran) Armaghan Ahmadi
Assistant coach	(United States) Erfan Ardestani
Goalkeeping coach	(Iran) Mohammadjavad Paksima
Fitness coach	(Iran) Ali Salehnia
Assistant coach	(Iran) Freydoon Hardani
Analyst	(Iran) Rahman Jahanshahloo
Team doctor	(Iran) Mohammad Jafari
Team manager	(Iran) Pirooz Seyfollahpour

== Players ==
=== Current squad ===
The following 23 players were called up for 2026 AFC U-17 Asian Cup qualification.

No.	Pos.	Player	Date of birth (age)	Club
1	GK	Bardia Dori		(Football Federation Islamic Republic of Iran) Khalij Fars Shiraz
12	GK	Morteza Tadayoni		(Football Federation Islamic Republic of Iran) Sepahan
22	GK	Abolfazl Hosseini	19 April 2009 (age 17)	
4	DF	Pouya Esmi	23 August 2009 (age 17)	(Football Federation Islamic Republic of Iran) Persepolis
5	DF	Mohammadali Rahnama		(Football Federation Islamic Republic of Iran) Sepahan
14	DF	Sam Golgon		(Football Federation Islamic Republic of Iran) Khalij Fars Shiraz
3	DF	Ali Asgharzadeh	1 August 2009 (age 17)	(Football Federation Islamic Republic of Iran) Sepahan
13	DF	Abbas Rafie		(Football Federation Islamic Republic of Iran) Foolad
2	DF	Amirmahan Afrouziani	21 January 2009 (age 17)	(Football Federation Islamic Republic of Iran) Persepolis
6	MF	Mohammadtaha Kaviani	6 June 2009 (age 17)	(Football Federation Islamic Republic of Iran) KIA
15	MF	Mohammad Biniaz	27 January 2009 (age 17)	(Football Federation Islamic Republic of Iran) Paykan
16	MF	Yasan Jafari	5 May 2010 (age 16)	(Football Federation Islamic Republic of Iran) Persepolis
8	MF	Pouya Jafari	9 April 2009 (age 17)	(Football Federation Islamic Republic of Iran) KIA
18	MF	Mohammadhossein Hajaliakbari		(Football Federation Islamic Republic of Iran) Sepahan
10	MF	Mahan Beheshti (captain)	28 February 2009 (age 17)	(Football Federation Islamic Republic of Iran) Malavan
20	MF	Amirmohammad Hosseini		(Football Federation Islamic Republic of Iran) Gol Gohar
7	FW	Jafar Asadi	3 April 2009 (age 17)	(Football Federation Islamic Republic of Iran) Paykan
21	FW	Amirtaha Mohammadimehr		(Football Federation Islamic Republic of Iran) Pars Borazjan
23	FW	Mobin Amiri		(Football Federation Islamic Republic of Iran) Foolad
11	FW	Amirhossein Tayefeh	6 May 2009 (age 17)	(Football Federation Islamic Republic of Iran) Persepolis
17	FW	Amirmohammad Afrasiabi		(Football Federation Islamic Republic of Iran) Sepahan
9	FW	Amirreza Valipour	10 February 2009 (age 17)	(Football Federation Islamic Republic of Iran) Persepolis
19	FW	Mohammad Ghasemi		(Football Federation Islamic Republic of Iran) Sepahan

=== Previous squads ===
==== FIFA U-17 World Cups ====
- FIFA U-17 World Championship 2001 squad
- FIFA U-17 World Cup 2009 squad
- FIFA U-17 World Cup 2013 squad
- FIFA U-17 World Cup 2017 squad
- FIFA U-17 World Cup 2023 squad

== Head-to-head record ==
The following table shows Iran's head-to-head record in the FIFA U-17 World Cup and AFC U-17 Asian Cup.

=== In FIFA U-17 World Cup ===
Opponent	Pld	W	D	L	GF	GA	GD	Win %
Argentina	1	0	1	0	1	1	+0	0.00
Austria	1	1	0	0	1	0	+1	100.00
Brazil	1	1	0	0	3	2	+1	100.00
Canada	1	0	1	0	1	1	+0	0.00
Colombia	1	0	1	0	0	0	+0	0.00
Costa Rica	2	1	0	1	3	2	+1	50.00
England	1	0	0	1	1	2	−1	0.00
Gambia	1	1	0	0	2	0	+2	100.00
Germany	1	1	0	0	4	0	+4	100.00
Guinea	1	1	0	0	3	1	+2	100.00
Mali	1	0	0	1	0	1	−1	0.00
Mexico	1	1	0	0	2	1	+1	100.00
Morocco	1	0	1	0	1	1	+0	0.00
Netherlands	1	1	0	0	1	0	+1	100.00
New Caledonia	1	1	0	0	5	0	+5	100.00
Nigeria	1	0	0	1	1	4	−3	0.00
Paraguay	1	0	0	1	2	3	−1	0.00
Spain	1	0	0	1	1	3	−2	0.00
Uruguay	1	0	0	1	1	2	−1	0.00
Total	20	9	4	7	33	24	+9	45.00

=== In AFC U-17 Asian Cup ===
Opponent	Pld	W	D	L	GF	GA	GD	Win %
Afghanistan	1	1	0	0	6	1	+5	100.00
Australia	1	1	0	0	5	1	+4	100.00
Bahrain	2	1	0	1	3	2	+1	50.00
Bangladesh	1	1	0	0	4	0	+4	100.00
China	2	0	0	2	0	5	−5	0.00
India	4	3	1	0	8	1	+7	75.00
Indonesia	1	0	0	1	0	2	−2	0.00
Iraq	4	1	2	1	3	4	−1	25.00
Japan	2	0	1	1	1	4	−3	0.00
Kuwait	3	3	0	0	8	3	+5	100.00
Laos	1	1	0	0	3	1	+2	100.00
Malaysia	1	1	0	0	5	0	+5	100.00
North Korea	5	0	3	2	2	5	−3	0.00
Oman	4	2	0	2	9	6	+3	50.00
Qatar	4	1	1	2	4	8	−4	25.00
Saudi Arabia	2	2	0	0	5	3	+2	100.00
Singapore	1	1	0	0	4	1	+3	100.00
South Korea	2	2	0	0	4	1	+3	100.00
Syria	3	1	1	1	4	3	+1	33.33
Tajikistan	2	0	0	2	2	5	−3	0.00
Thailand	3	1	0	2	4	5	−1	33.33
United Arab Emirates	2	1	1	0	4	1	+3	50.00
Uzbekistan	2	1	0	1	4	4	+0	50.00
Vietnam	3	3	0	0	14	0	+14	100.00
Yemen	3	2	1	0	5	1	+4	66.67
Total	59	30	11	18	111	67	+44	50.85

== See also ==
- Iran national football team
- Iran national under-23 football team
- Iran national under-20 football team
