= 2015 WAFF U-16 Championship =

Tournament details
- Host country: Jordan
- City: Amman
- Dates: 29 July – 6 August
- Teams: 5 (from 1 sub-confederation)
- Venue: 1 (in 1 host city)

Final positions
- Champions: Iraq (2nd title)
- Runners-up: Saudi Arabia
- Third place: United Arab Emirates
- Fourth place: Palestine

Tournament statistics
- Matches played: 10
- Goals scored: 34 (3.4 per match)
- Top scorer: (Iraq) Mohanad Ali (5 goals)
- Best player: (Saudi Arabia) Hamad Al-Abdan

The 2015 WAFF U-16 Championship is the fifth edition of the WAFF Youth Competition. The previous edition was an Under-16 age group competition held in Palestine in 2013.

== Participating nations ==
5 West Asian Federation teams entered the competition.

Team	Appearance	Last appearance	Previous best performance
Iraq	5th	2013	Champions (2013)
Jordan	5th	2013	Third place (2007, 2013)
Palestine	4th	2013	Group stage (2005, 2009, 2013)
Saudi Arabia	1st	—N/a	—N/a
United Arab Emirates	3rd	2013	Runners-up (2013)

== Results ==
Team	Pld	W	D	L	GF	GA	GD	Pts
Iraq	4	4	0	0	12	1	+11	12
Saudi Arabia	4	2	1	1	10	6	+4	7
United Arab Emirates	4	2	0	2	7	8	−1	6
Palestine	4	1	0	3	3	10	−7	3
Jordan	4	0	1	3	2	9	−7	1

Source: WAFF
29 July 2015
17:00

Jordan	0–5	Iraq
	Report	Ali 4', 45', 64'; Shayyal 58'; Abed 66'

Petra Stadium, Amman
Referee: Sultan Almarzooqi (United Arab Emirates)
29 July 2015
20:15

Palestine	2–3	United Arab Emirates
Rashid 12'; Alhourani 80'	Report	Alhammadi 10'; Rashid 67' (o.g.); Almehrzi 90+3' (pen.)

Petra Stadium, Amman
Referee: Falah Saad (Iraq)

31 July 2015
17:00

Saudi Arabia	4–0	Palestine
Almas 11'; Alshaikhi 18'; Alabdan 82'; Alassaf 87' (pen.)	Report

Petra Stadium, Amman
Referee: Sultan Almarzooqi (United Arab Emirates)
31 July 2015
20:15

United Arab Emirates	1–0	Jordan
Amro 70' (pen.)	Report

Petra Stadium, Amman
Referee: Shukri Alhunfush (Saudi Arabia)

2 August 2015
17:00

Palestine	1–0	Jordan
Alatawna 4'	Report

Petra Stadium, Amman
Referee: Shukri Alhunfush (Saudi Arabia)
2 August 2015
20:45

Saudi Arabia	0–2	Iraq
	Report	Ali 29' (pen.); Al-Elayawi 76'

Petra Stadium, Amman
Referee: Ahmed Faisal (Jordan)

4 August 2015
17:00

United Arab Emirates	2–4	Saudi Arabia
Alruwais 54'; Amro 90+4'	Report	Alabdan 12', 87'; Mahboob 22' (o.g.); Mali 90+3'

Petra Stadium, Amman
Referee: Falah Saad (Iraq)
4 August 2015
20:15

Iraq	3–0	Palestine
Mukhlif 35', 90+3'; Abed 40'	Report

Petra Stadium, Amman
Referee: Sultan Almarzooqi (United Arab Emirates)

6 August 2015

Iraq	2–1	United Arab Emirates
Ali 90+3'	Report

Petra Stadium, Amman
6 August 2015

Jordan	2–2	Saudi Arabia

Petra Stadium, Amman

== Champion ==
2015 WAFF U-16 Championship champion

Iraq
Second title

== Awards ==
The following awards were given at the conclusion of the tournament:

Top Goalscorer	Best player	Fair Play award
(Iraq) Mohanad Ali	(Saudi Arabia) Hamad Al-Abdan	Saudi Arabia
