= 2018 WAFF U-16 Championship =

Tournament details
- Host country: Jordan
- City: Amman
- Dates: 1–9 August
- Teams: 5 (from 1 confederation)
- Venues: 2 (in 1 host city)

Final positions
- Champions: Japan (1st title)
- Runners-up: India
- Third place: Jordan
- Fourth place: Yemen

Tournament statistics
- Matches played: 10
- Goals scored: 36 (3.6 per match)
- Top scorer: (Jordan) Reziq Bani Hani (6 goals)

The 2018 WAFF U-16 Championship is the sixth edition of the WAFF Youth Competition. The previous edition was an Under-16 age group competition held in Jordan in 2015.

== Participating nations ==
| Team | Appearance | Last appearance | Previous best performance |
|---|---|---|---|
| India | 1st | —N/a | —N/a |
| Iraq | 6th | 2015 | Champions (2013, 2015) |
| Japan | 1st | —N/a | —N/a |
| Jordan | 6th | 2015 | Third place (2007, 2013) |
| Yemen | 2nd | 2009 | Group stage (2009) |

== Results ==
| Team | Pld | W | D | L | GF | GA | GD | Pts |
|---|---|---|---|---|---|---|---|---|
| Japan | 4 | 4 | 0 | 0 | 9 | 4 | +5 | 12 |
| India | 4 | 3 | 0 | 1 | 9 | 2 | +7 | 9 |
| Jordan | 4 | 2 | 0 | 2 | 11 | 9 | +2 | 6 |
| Yemen | 4 | 1 | 0 | 3 | 5 | 4 | +1 | 3 |
| Iraq | 4 | 0 | 0 | 4 | 2 | 13 | −11 | 0 |

Source: WAFF
1 August 2018
17:00

| Jordan | 0–4 | India |
|---|---|---|
| | Report | V. P. Singh 43', 61', 73'; Oram 84' |

King Abdullah Stadium, Amman
Referee: Ammar Ashkanani (Kuwait)
1 August 2018
20:00

| Yemen | 0–1 | Japan |
|---|---|---|
| | Report | Nakano 63' |

King Abdullah Stadium, Amman
Referee: Omar Al Miani (Jordan)

3 August 2018
17:00

| Yemen | 2–0 | Iraq |
|---|---|---|
| Ali 62', 85' | Report |

Amman International Stadium, Amman
Referee: Emad Bojeh (Palestine)
3 August 2018
20:00

| Japan | 2–1 | India |
|---|---|---|
| Kondo 57'; Toyama 64' | Report | V. P. Singh 26' |

Amman International Stadium, Amman
Referee: Ahmad Al Ali (Kuwait)

5 August 2018
17:00

| Japan | 3–2 | Jordan |
|---|---|---|
| Kondo 31'; Handa 54'; Aoki 64' | Report | Bani Hani 8'; Al-Ruzi 90+4' |

King Abdullah Stadium, Amman
Referee: Watheq Mohammad (Iraq)
5 August 2018
20:00

| India | 1–0 | Iraq |
|---|---|---|
| Shendre 90+3' | Report |

King Abdullah Stadium, Amman
Referee: Feras Yousef (Yemen)

7 August 2018
17:00

| India | 3–0 | Yemen |
|---|---|---|
| H. Singh 39'; Demello 47'; Danu 49' | Report |

Amman International Stadium, Amman
Referee: Watheq Mohammad (Iraq)
7 August 2018
20:00

| Iraq | 1–7 | Jordan |
|---|---|---|
| Mohammad 57' | Report | Bani Hani 16', 33', 50', 53', 85'; Al-Hanahneh 37'; Al-Shanaineh 90+3' |

Amman International Stadium, Amman
Referee: Ahmad Al Ali (Kuwait)

9 August 2018
17:00

| Iraq | 1–3 | Japan |
|---|---|---|
| Abed 65' | Report | Toyama 49'; Nakano 88', 90' |

King Abdullah Stadium, Amman
Referee: Omar AlMaani (Jordan)
9 August 2018
20:00

| Jordan | 2–1 | Yemen |
|---|---|---|
| Semreen 71', 80' | Report | Ali 81' |

King Abdullah Stadium, Amman
Referee: Ammar Ashkanani (Kuwait)

== Champion ==
2018 WAFF U-16 Championship champion

Japan
First title
