= 2009 WAFF U-15 Championship =

Tournament details
- Host country: Jordan
- City: Amman
- Dates: 13–18 August
- Teams: 9 (from 1 confederation)
- Venues: 2 (in 1 host city)

Final positions
- Champions: Iran (2nd title)
- Runners-up: Syria
- Third place: Iraq
- Fourth place: Jordan

Tournament statistics
- Matches played: 13
- Goals scored: 47 (3.62 per match)
- Top scorer: (Iraq) Hussein Abdullah Alfuadi (7 goals)

The 2009 WAFF U-15 Championship was the third edition of the WAFF U-15 Championship, an under-15 international tournament for member nations of the West Asian Football Federation (WAFF). It took place in Amman, Jordan from 13 to 18 August 2009, featuring 9 teams.

== Participating nations ==
9 West Asian Federation teams entered the competition.

Team	Appearance	Last appearance	Previous best performance
Bahrain	1st	—N/a	—N/a
Iran	3rd	2007	Champions (2005)
Iraq	3rd	2007	Third place (2005)
Jordan	3rd	2007	Third place (2007)
Kuwait	1st	—N/a	—N/a
Palestine	2nd	2005	Group stage (2005)
Syria	3rd	2007	Champions (2007)
United Arab Emirates	1st	—N/a	—N/a
Yemen	1st	—N/a	—N/a

== Venues ==
The competition was played in two venues in the city of Amman.

Amman	2009 WAFF U-15 Championship is located in Amman	Amman
King Abdullah II Stadium	2009 WAFF U-15 Championship is located in Amman	Petra Stadium
Capacity: 13,265	2009 WAFF U-15 Championship is located in Amman	Capacity: 6,000

== Group stage ==
=== Group A ===
Pos	Team	Pld	W	D	L	GF	GA	GD	Pts	Qualification
1	Iraq	2	2	0	0	9	1	+8	6	Knockout stage
2	Syria	2	1	0	1	4	3	+1	3	Knockout stage
3	Yemen	2	0	0	2	0	9	−9	0	

Source: goalzz
13 August 2009
15:30

Yemen	0–6	Iraq
		Ali 21' (pen.); Abdullah 23', 50'; Haitham 43'; Weli 84', 90'

Petra Stadium, Amman

14 August 2009
15:30

Iraq	3–1	Syria
Abdullah 47', 62'; Abdul Kareem 36'		Taqi 57'

Petra Stadium, Amman

15 August 2009
15:30

Yemen	0–3	Syria
		Taqi 15'; Omar 66'; Al-Hussny 85'

Petra Stadium, Amman

=== Group B ===
Pos	Team	Pld	W	D	L	GF	GA	GD	Pts	Qualification
1	Iran	2	2	0	0	4	1	+3	6	Knockout stage
2	United Arab Emirates	2	1	0	1	2	2	0	3	
3	Kuwait	2	0	0	2	2	5	−3	0	

Source: goalzz
13 August 2009
18:15

United Arab Emirates	2–1	Kuwait
Saeed 5'; Ahmed 47'		Al Sarheed 20' (pen.)

King Abdullah II Stadium, Amman

14 August 2009
18:15

Kuwait	1–3	Iran
Al-Subayie 21' (pen.)		Najafi 25'; Fathian 50', 80'

Petra Stadium, Amman

15 August 2009
18:15

United Arab Emirates	0–1	Iran
		Fathian 18'

King Abdullah II Stadium, Amman

=== Group C ===
Pos	Team	Pld	W	D	L	GF	GA	GD	Pts	Qualification
1	Jordan	2	1	1	0	3	2	+1	4	Knockout stage
2	Bahrain	2	1	0	1	4	3	+1	3	
3	Palestine	2	0	1	1	2	4	−2	1	

Source: goalzz
13 August 2009
18:15

Jordan	2–1	Bahrain
Ghaith 61'; Raja 90+1' (pen.)		Salim 81' (pen.)

Petra Stadium, Amman

14 August 2009
18:15

Bahrain	3–1	Palestine
Al-Khaldy 13', 78'; Subait 15'		Jalayta 68'

King Abdullah II Stadium, Amman

15 August 2009
18:15

Jordan	1–1	Palestine
Al-Bashtawi 65'		Maraaba 42'

Petra Stadium, Amman

=== Ranking of second-placed teams ===
The best runner-up team from the three groups advanced to the semi-finals along with the three group winners.

Pos	Grp	Team	Pld	W	D	L	GF	GA	GD	Pts	Qualification
1	A	Syria (Note: Syria and Bahrain finished with an identical record, and equal claim on second place in their respective groups. Therefore, a draw was held to determine the qualified team and it was Syria that was drawn as the best runner-up team.)	2	1	0	1	4	3	+1	3	Knockout stage
2	C	Bahrain	2	1	0	1	4	3	+1	3	
3	B	United Arab Emirates	2	1	0	1	2	2	0	3	

Source: kooora
Rules for classification: 1) Points; 2) Goal difference; 3) Goals scored; 4) Fair play points; 5) Drawing of lots.

== Knockout stage ==
=== Bracket ===
Semi-finals
17 August
Iraq	3 (3)
Iran (p)	3 (4)
17 August
Jordan	0
Syria	2

Final
18 August
Iran	3
Syria	2
Third place
18 August
Iraq	3
Jordan	1

=== Semi-finals ===
17 August 2009
17:00

Iraq	3–3	Iran
Kamel 2', 70'; Abdullah 45' (pen.)		1'; Abbas 20', 40'
Penalties
	3–4

King Abdullah II Stadium, Amman
17 August 2009
17:00

Jordan	0–2	Syria
		Alsabouh 72'; Al-Hussny 81'

Petra Stadium, Amman

=== Third place ===
18 August 2009
15:30

Iraq	3–1	Jordan
Ali 26'; Abdullah 37', 61'		Al-Bashtawi 81'

Petra Stadium, Amman

=== Final ===
18 August 2009
18:15

Iran	3–2	Syria
Fathian 31', 34', 50'		Taqi 45'; Al-Hussny 65'

Petra Stadium, Amman

== Champion ==
2009 WAFF U-15 Championship champion

Iran
Second title

== Statistics ==
=== Goalscorers ===
There have been 47 goals scored in 13 matches, for an average of 3.62 goals per match.

7 goals

- (Iraq) Hussein Abdullah Alfuadi

6 goals

- (Iran) Ali Fathian

3 goals

- (Syria) Adnan Taqi
- (Syria) Ihab Al-Hussny

2 goals

- (Bahrain) Nawaf Al-Khaldy
- (Iran) Amir Abbas Aeinehchi
- (Jordan) Laith Al-Bashtawi
- (Iraq) Mahdi Kamel Shiltagh
- (Iraq) Ali Weli
- (Iraq) Rasoul Ali

1 goal

- (Bahrain) Ayad Subait
- (Bahrain) Mubarak Salim
- (Iran) Fahad Najafi
- (Iran)
- (Iraq) Hussam Haitham
- (Iraq) Muntadher Abdul Kareem
- (Jordan) Abdul-Rahman Ghaith
- (Jordan) Samir Raja
- (Kuwait) Abdullah Al-Subayie
- (Kuwait) Mohammed Al Sarheed
- (Palestine) Ibrahim Jalayta
- (Palestine) Mohammed Maraaba
- (Syria) Abdul Rahman Alsabouh
- (Syria) Mohammed Hussam Omar
- (United Arab Emirates) Jawhar Ahmed
- (United Arab Emirates) Yousif Saeed
