= Petra Stadium =

Stadium in Amman, Jordan

Coordinates: 31°58′54″N 35°54′14″E

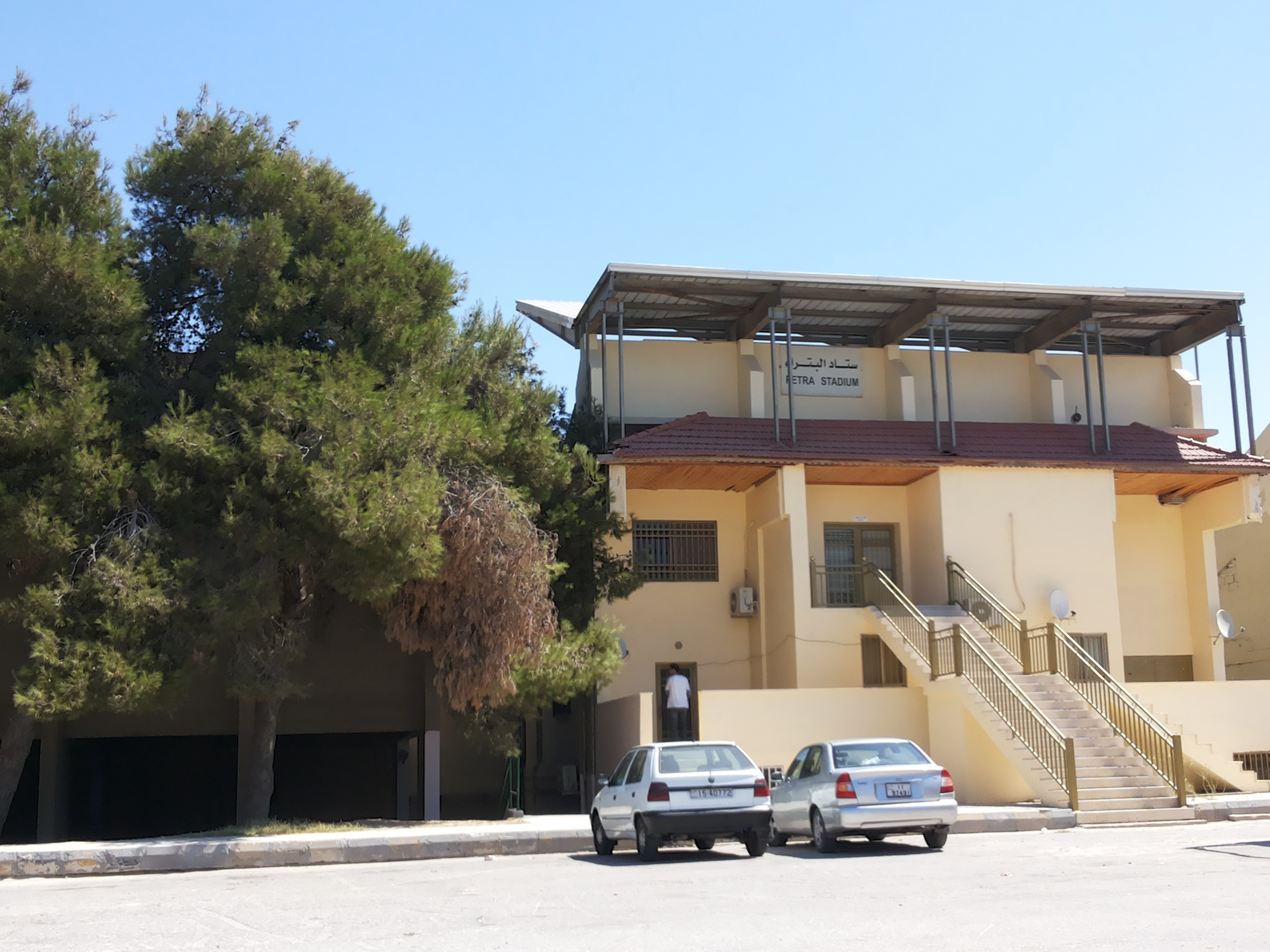
- Interactive map of Petra Stadium
- Full name: Petra Stadium
- Location: Amman, Jordan
- Capacity: 6,000

Tenants
- Jordan women's national football team Jordan U-20; Al-Ahli (Amman); Al-Jazeera (Amman)

Petra Stadium is a multi-use stadium in Amman, Jordan. It is currently used mostly for football matches. The stadium has a capacity of 6,000 spectators.
