= 2013 WAFF U-16 Championship =

Tournament details
- Host country: Palestine
- Dates: 18–21 August
- Teams: 4 (from 1 sub-confederation)
- Venue: 3 (in 3 host cities)

Final positions
- Champions: Iraq (1st title)
- Runners-up: United Arab Emirates
- Third place: Jordan
- Fourth place: Palestine

Tournament statistics
- Matches played: 6
- Goals scored: 23 (3.83 per match)
- Top scorer: (Iraq) Ameer Sabah (3 goals)

The 2013 WAFF U-16 Championship is the fourth edition of the WAFF Youth Competition. The previous edition was an Under-15 age group competition held in Jordan in 2009.

== Participating nations ==
4 West Asian Federation teams entered the competition.

Team	Appearance	Last appearance	Previous best performance
Iraq	4th	2009	Third place (2005, 2009)
Jordan	4th	2009	Third place (2007)
Palestine	3rd	2009	Group stage (2005, 2009)
United Arab Emirates	2nd	2009	Group stage (2009)

== Tournament information ==
All games were hosted at the Faisal Al-Husseini International Stadium. Initially, players and staff had been denied entry to the West Bank by Israeli authorities. Israel issued entry visas following an intervention from Jordanian prince and FIFA Vice-President Prince Ali Bin Al-Hussein. The competition has been temporarily postponed due to the issue.

== Results ==
Team	Pld	W	D	L	GF	GA	GD	Pts
Iraq	3	2	1	0	10	2	+8	7
United Arab Emirates	3	2	1	0	8	3	+5	7
Jordan	3	0	1	2	3	8	−5	1
Palestine	3	0	1	2	2	10	−8	1

Source: WAFF
18 August 2013
16:05

Palestine	2–2	Jordan
Dahla 42', 61'	Report	Alzu'bi 45+1'; Alja'afreh 82'

Faisal Al-Husseini International Stadium, Al-Ram
Referee: Abdullah Ali Abdullah Al-Ajeel Al-Zaabi (United Arab Emirates)
18 August 2013
19:00

United Arab Emirates	2–2	Iraq
Lafi 16'; Al-Matroushi 80'	Report	Sabah 26'; Jassim 63'

Faisal Al-Husseini International Stadium, Al-Ram
Referee: Jawad Assi (Palestine)

19 August 2013
17:00

Jordan	1–2	United Arab Emirates
Tannous 10'	Report	Al Otaiba 7', 72'

Faisal Al-Husseini International Stadium, Al-Ram
Referee: Falah Abid Saad (Iraq)
19 August 2013
19:00

Iraq	4–0	Palestine
Jassim 21'; Kadhim 59'; Sabah 88'; Mahmood 90+2' (pen.)	Report

Hussein Bin Ali Stadium, Hebron
Referee: Abdullah Ali Abdullah Al-Ajeel Al-Zaabi (United Arab Emirates)

21 August 2013
16:00

Palestine	0–4	United Arab Emirates
	Report	Al-Matroushi 45+1'; Malalla 48'; Al Hammadi 53'; Saleh 62'

Dura International Stadium, Dura
Referee: Falah Abid Saad (Iraq)
21 August 2013
19:00

Jordan	0–4	Iraq
	Report	Sabah 18'; Hadi 43'; Mahmood 57'; Tuaimah 62'

Dura International Stadium, Dura
Referee: Marwan Wazwaz (Palestine)

== Champion ==
2013 WAFF U-16 Championship champion

Iraq
First title

== Statistics ==
=== Goalscorers ===
There have been 23 goals scored in 6 matches, for an average of 3.83 goals per match.

3 goals

- (Iraq) Ameer Sabah

2 goals

- (Iraq) Husam Mahmood
- (Iraq) Sajjad Jassim
- (Palestine) Raed Dahla
- (United Arab Emirates) Faisel Al-Matroushi
- (United Arab Emirates) Eissa Al Otaiba

1 goal

- (Iraq) Hayder Ali Abboodi
- (Iraq) Mohammed Hadi
- (Iraq) Ali Tuaimah
- (Jordan) Baha'Aldeen Alja'afreh
- (Jordan) Ahmad Tannous
- (Jordan) Abdel Shokri Alzu'bi
- (United Arab Emirates) Khamis Saleh
- (United Arab Emirates) Hammadi
- (United Arab Emirates) Majd Lafi
- (United Arab Emirates) Abdulla Malalla
