= Iraq national under-17 football team =

Iraq under-17
- Nickname(s): Usood al-Rafidayn (Lions of Mesopotamia)
- Association: Iraq Football Association
- Confederation: AFC (Asia)
- Head coach: Salam Shaker
- Captain: Karrar Kadhim
- FIFA code: IRQ
First colours	Second colours	Third colours

First international
- Qatar 3–0 Iraq (Doha, Qatar; 14 September 1984)

Biggest win
- Iraq 8–1 Turkmenistan (Kathmandu, Nepal; 25 September 2013)

Biggest defeat
- Nigeria 5–0 Iraq (Dubai, UAE; 25 October 2013)

FIFA U-17 World Cup
- Appearances: 2 (first in 2013)
- Best result: Round of 16 (2017)

AFC U-17 Asian Cup
- Appearances: 10 (first in 1985)
- Best result: Champions (2016)

The Iraq national under-17 football team represents Iraq in international football competitions in AFC U-17 Asian Cup which Iraq holds one title, as well as any other international football tournaments. The team is controlled by the governing body for football in Iraq, Iraq Football Association (IFA).

== Matches ==
=== Recent results and fixtures ===
- The following is a list of match results in the last 12 months, as well as any future matches that have been scheduled.

Legend

Win Draw Lose

17 October 2026 2026 GFF U-17 Gulf Cup	Iraq	0–2	Yemen

23 October 2026 2026 GFF U-17 Gulf Cup	Kuwait	0–3	Iraq

26 October 2026 2026 GFF U-17 Gulf Cup	Iraq	0–5	Egypt

29 October 2026 2026 GFF U-17 Gulf Cup	Saudi Arabia	1–0	Iraq

8 November 2026 2027 AFC U-17 Asian Cup qualification	Hong Kong	1–1	Iraq

14 November 2026 2027 AFC U-17 Asian Cup qualification	Iraq	3–2	Chinese Taipei

17 November 2026 2027 AFC U-17 Asian Cup qualification	Iraq	5–0	Maldives

20 November 2026 2027 AFC U-17 Asian Cup qualification	Thailand	1–2	Iraq

== Coaching staff ==
Position	Name
Head coach	(Iraq) Ahmed Kadhim
Assistant coach	(Iraq) Emad Aoda
Assistant coach	(Iraq) Haidar Raheem
Assistant coach	(Iraq) Mohammed Ali Karim
Goalkeeping coach	(Iraq) Salah Lofty
Fitness coach	(Iraq) Mustafa Salam
Techchnical Supervisor	(Iraq) Riyadh Mezher
Team doctor	(Iraq) Saad Hussein

== Players ==
=== Current squad ===
The following players were selected for the 2026 Arab Gulf Cup U-17.

No.	Pos.	Player	Date of birth (age)	Club
	GK	Laith Mohammed		
	GK	Ayhad Khalat		
	GK	Hussein Majid		
	GK	Harith Hamza		
	DF	Ali Diaa		
	DF	Mohammed Rikan		
	DF	Ayoub Amer		
	DF	Hussein Haider		
	DF	Hussein Abbas		
	DF	Ali Hisham		
	DF	Jiavan Farouq		
	DF	Mustafa Haitham		
	DF	Abdullah Amir		
	MF	Hussein Hamza		
	MF	Amjad Kamal		
	MF	Ayman Ahmed		
	MF	Mohammed Hani		
	MF	Sajjad Raed		
	MF	Abdullah Kadhim		
	MF	Laith Saad		
	MF	Hassan Haider		
	MF	Malath Ahmed		
	MF	Ahmed Saad		
	MF	Musa Adel		
	MF	Mahdi Mohammed		
	FW	Yusuf Zigar		
	FW	Rasoul Mohammed		
	FW	Mohammed Murtadha		

== Coaches ==
As of 30 May 2023

Name	Period	Matches	Wins	Draws	Losses	Win %	Achievements
(Iraq) Amer Jameel	1984–1985	8	5	0	3	62.50	Third place at 1985 AFC U-16 Championship
(Iraq) Yahya Alwan	1986	2	1	0	1	50.00	
(Iraq) Sabah Ridha	1988	5	4	0	1	80.00	
(Iraq) Wathiq Naji	1988	6	2	2	2	33.33	Fourth place at 1988 AFC U-16 Championship
(Iraq) Amer Jameel	1994	6	2	1	3	33.33	
(Iraq) Adnan Hamad	1998	6	4	0	2	66.67	
(Iraq) Ammo Baba	2000	3	1	1	1	33.33	
(Iraq) Ahmed Radhi	2002	4	2	0	2	50.00	
(Iraq) Salih Radhi	2003–2004	10	7	1	2	70.00	
(Iraq) Kadhim Khalaf	2005–2006	0	0	0	0	—	
(Iraq) Hassan Ahmed	2007–2008	0	0	0	0	—	
(Iraq) Muwafaq Hussein	2009–2013	18	12	2	4	66.67	Qualified for 2013 FIFA U-17 World Cup
(Iraq) Taleb Chaloub	2013	8	4	3	1	50.00	
(Iraq) Qahtan Chathir	2014–2017	13	7	4	2	53.85	Qualified for 2017 FIFA U-17 World Cup; Winner of 2016 AFC U-16 Championship
(Iraq) Ali Hadi	2017–2018	3	2	1	0	66.67	
(Iraq) Faisal Aziz	2018	3	1	0	2	33.33	
(Iraq) Emad Mohammed	2019–2021	7	3	2	2	42.86	
(Iraq) Hassan Kamal	2021–2022	8	4	2	2	50.00	
(Iraq) Ahmed Kadhim	2022–2025	8	3	3	2	37.50	
(Spain) José María Zarco Martín	2025–2026	0	0	0	0	—	
(Iraq) Salam Shaker	2026–	0	0	0	0	—	

== Competitive record ==
=== FIFA U-17 World Cup ===
FIFA U-17 World Cup
Hosts / Year	Result	Position	GP	W	D	L	GS	GA
(China) 1985	did not qualify							
(Canada) 1987	did not qualify							
(Scotland) 1989	did not qualify							
(Italy) 1991	did not qualify							
(Japan) 1993	did not enter							
(Ecuador) 1995	did not qualify							
(Egypt) 1997	did not enter							
(New Zealand) 1999	did not qualify							
(Trinidad and Tobago) 2001	did not qualify							
(Finland) 2003	did not qualify							
(Peru) 2005	did not qualify							
(South Korea) 2007	did not qualify							
(Nigeria) 2009	disqualified							
(Mexico) 2011	did not qualify							
(United Arab Emirates) 2013	Group stage	23rd	3	0	0	3	2	12
(Chile) 2015	did not qualify							
(India) 2017	Round of 16	13th	4	1	1	2	5	10
(Brazil) 2019	did not qualify							
(Indonesia) 2023	did not qualify							
(Qatar) 2025	did not qualify							
(Qatar) 2026	did not qualify							
(Qatar) 2027	To be determined							
Total	Best: R16	2/20	7	1	1	5	7	22

FIFA U-17 World Cup history
Year	Round	Score	Result
2013
2013	Group stage	Iraq 1–4 Sweden	Loss
2013	Group stage	Iraq 1–3 Mexico	Loss
2013	Group stage	Iraq 0–5 Nigeria	Loss
2017
2017	Group stage	Iraq 1–1 Mexico	Draw
2017	Group stage	Iraq 3–0 Chile	Win
2017	Group stage	Iraq 0–4 England	Loss
2017	Round of 16	Iraq 1–5 Mali	Loss

=== AFC U-17 Asian Cup ===
AFC U-17 Asian Cup								Qualification record					
Hosts / Year	Result	GP	W	D*	L	GS	GA	GP	W	D	L	GF	GA
(Qatar) 1985	Third Place	5	3	0	2	3	2	3	2	0	1	3	4
(Qatar) 1986	did not qualify							2	1	0	1	5	3
(Thailand) 1988	Fourth place	6	2	2	2	9	6						
(United Arab Emirates) 1990	did not qualify												
(Saudi Arabia) 1992	did not enter												
(Qatar) 1994	Group stage	4	1	1	2	4	7	2	1	0	1	2	3
(Thailand) 1996	did not enter												
(Qatar) 1998	Group stage	4	2	0	2	9	4	2	2	0	0	8	1
(Vietnam) 2000	did not qualify							3	1	1	1	6	3
(United Arab Emirates) 2002	did not qualify							2	0	0	2	2	6
(Japan) 2004	Quarterfinals	4	2	0	2	7	6	2	2	0	0	5	2
(Singapore) 2006	Group stage	3	0	2	1	1	2	2	2	0	0	4	0
(Uzbekistan) 2008	Disqualified												
(Uzbekistan) 2010	Quarterfinals	4	2	0	2	7	5	5	4	0	1	15	3
(Iran) 2012	Semifinals	5	3	1	1	8	7	4	3	1	0	17	2
(Thailand) 2014	did not qualify							3	1	1	1	11	5
(India) 2016	Champions	6	3	3	0	10	5	3	3	0	0	9	1
(Malaysia) 2018	Group stage	3	1	0	2	3	5	3	2	1	0	5	0
(Thailand) 2023	did not qualify							4	1	2	1	4	2
(Saudi Arabia) 2025	did not qualify							3	2	0	1	9	1
(Saudi Arabia) 2026	did not qualify							4	2	2	0	9	7
(Uzbekistan) 2027	Qualified							4	3	1	0	11	4
Total	Best: Champions	44	19	9	17	61	49	55	34	9	11	130	49

=== WAFF U-16 Championship ===
WAFF Championship Record
Year	Result	GP	W	D*	L	GS	GA
(Iran) 2005	Third place	4	2	1	1	14	2
(Syria) 2007	Fourth place	4	1	1	2	7	6
(Jordan) 2009	Third place	4	3	0	1	15	6
(Palestine) 2013	Champions	3	2	1	0	10	2
(Jordan) 2015	Champions	4	4	0	0	12	1
(Jordan) 2018	Fifth place	4	0	0	4	2	13
(Jordan) 2019	Fourth place	4	1	2	1	3	2
(Saudi Arabia) 2021	Group stage	2	1	0	1	3	3
(Jordan) 2022	Semi-finals	4	3	0	1	6	2
(Oman) 2023	Semi-finals	4	2	0	2	6	5
(Jordan) 2024	Group stage	2	0	0	2	0	6
(Jordan) 2025	Group stage	3	1	0	2	5	3
(Jordan) 2026	Did not enter						
Total	Best: Champions	42	20	4	17	82	51

=== Arab Cup U-17 ===
Arab Cup U-17
Year	Result	Pld	W	D	L	GF	GA
(Tunisia) 2012	Runners-up	4	3	0	1	14	5
(Qatar) 2014	Champions	5	4	1	0	10	1
(Algeria) 2022	Quarterfinals	4	2	1	1	6	7
Total	Best: Champions	13	9	2	2	30	13

=== GFF U-17 Gulf Cup ===
GFF U-17 Gulf Cup record
Year	Result	Position	GP	W	D	L	GF	GA	Squad
(Bahrain) 2001 to (Qatar) 2025	Did not enter								
(Qatar) 2026	TBD	TBD	1	0	0	1	0	2	Squad
Total	Best: TBD	1/14	1	0	0	1	0	2	—

== Head-to-head record ==
The following table shows Iraq's head-to-head record in the FIFA U-17 World Cup and AFC U-17 Asian Cup.

=== In FIFA U-17 World Cup ===
Opponent	Pld	W	D	L	GF	GA	GD	Win %
Chile	1	1	0	0	3	0	+3	100.00
England	1	0	0	1	0	4	−4	0.00
Mali	1	0	0	1	1	5	−4	0.00
Mexico	2	0	1	1	2	4	−2	0.00
Nigeria	1	0	0	1	0	5	−5	0.00
Sweden	1	0	0	1	1	4	−3	0.00
Total	7	1	1	5	7	22	−15	14.29

=== In AFC U-17 Asian Cup ===
Opponent	Pld	W	D	L	GF	GA	GD	Win %
Afghanistan	1	1	0	0	2	1	+1	100.00
Australia	2	0	1	1	1	2	−1	0.00
Bahrain	1	0	0	1	0	3	−3	0.00
Bangladesh	1	1	0	0	3	1	+2	100.00
China	4	2	1	1	5	3	+2	50.00
Iran	4	1	2	1	4	3	+1	25.00
Japan	5	2	1	2	7	10	−3	40.00
Kuwait	2	2	0	0	6	1	+5	100.00
Malaysia	1	0	1	0	1	1	+0	0.00
North Korea	2	2	0	0	7	0	+7	100.00
Oman	2	1	1	0	3	2	+1	50.00
Qatar	4	1	0	3	2	4	−2	25.00
Saudi Arabia	1	0	0	1	1	2	−1	0.00
South Korea	3	1	0	2	2	4	−2	33.33
South Yemen	1	1	0	0	1	0	+1	100.00
Tajikistan	1	0	0	1	0	1	−1	0.00
Thailand	4	2	0	2	5	4	+1	50.00
United Arab Emirates	2	0	1	1	4	5	−1	0.00
Uzbekistan	2	2	0	0	6	1	+5	100.00
Yemen	1	0	1	0	1	1	+0	0.00
Total	44	19	9	16	61	49	+12	43.18

== See also ==
- Iraq national football team
- Iraq national under-23 football team
- Iraq national under-20 football team
