= Syria national under-17 football team =

Syria Under-17
- Nickname(s): Nosour Qasioun (Arabic: نسور قاسيون, lit. 'The Qasioun Eagles')
- Association: Syrian Football Association (SFA)
- Confederation: AFC (Asia)
- Sub-confederation: WAFF (West Asia); UAFA (Arab world)
- Head coach: Wilco van Buuren
- FIFA code: SYR
First colours	Second colours

FIFA ranking
- Highest: 100 (2018)

FIFA U-17 World Cup
- Appearances: 2 (first in 2007)
- Best result: Round of 16 (2007)

AFC U-17 Asian Cup
- Appearances: 6 (first in 2002)
- Best result: Third place (2014)

Arab Cup U-17
- Appearances: 1 (first in 2011)
- Best result: (silver) Runners-up (2011)

The Syria national under-17 football team is the national football youth team of Syria. It is governed by the Syrian Football Association.

== History ==
The first official appearance of a Syrian U-17 team was in the AFC U-17 Championship 2002 Qualification. In Group Two of the qualification, Syria beat Saudi Arabia 1-0 on aggregate, the only goal coming in the second leg in Syria, and so qualified for the finals at the first attempt.

In the AFC U-17 Championship 2002, Syria beat Qatar in the first match of the group stage, then followed a draw against Uzbekistan and a defeat against Japan before falling to a 2-1 defeat against Yemen in the quarter-finals.

Three years later, Syria qualified for the AFC U-17 Championship 2006 in Singapore. Despite being beaten 1-0 by China in their opening game, the Syrian team advanced to the second round with a 7-0 win over Bangladesh and a 2-0 victory against Vietnam. Syria reached the quarter-finals and won 2-1 against Saudi Arabia, but lost 2-0 in the semi-finals against eventual champions Japan. Despite losing the third place playoff against Tajikistan in a penalty shootout, they qualified for the 2007 FIFA U-17 World Cup in South Korea.

In Thailand 2014, Syria was among the four semi-finalists who qualified for Chile 2015.

== Players ==
=== Current Squad ===
These 24 players were selected for the most recent fixtures in the 2026 AFC U-17 Asian Cup qualification.

No.	Pos.	Player	Date of birth (age)	Club
1	GK	Assad Hasan	2 February 2009 (age 17)	(Syrian Football Association) Jableh
22	GK	Rashid Husaini		
23	GK	Mohamad Zein Durrah		(Syrian Football Association) Al-Wahda
2	DF	Abdullah Awad		(Jordan Football Association) Al-Hussein
3	DF	Ali Wassouf		(Syrian Football Association) Al-Muhafaza SC
4	DF	Mahmoud Kojak		(Syrian Football Association) Ommal Hama SC
5	DF	Yahya Hamoud		(Syrian Football Association) Al-Hurriya
13	DF	Mustafa Sharaf Al-Din		(Syrian Football Association) Al-Jaish
14	DF	Mohamad Al-Ali Al-Sallal		(Syrian Football Association) Ahli Aleppo
15	DF	Nejarfan Mahmoud		(Syrian Football Association) Al-Jaish
6	MF	Youssef Saleh		(Syrian Football Association) Al-Jaish
8	MF	Mahmoud Al-Hajji		(Syrian Football Association) Ahli Aleppo
16	MF	Odey Al-Fashtaki	1 January 2009 (age 17)	(German Football Association) 1. FC Saarbrücken
17	MF	Fares Sabouh		(Syrian Football Association) Al-Jaish
18	MF	Imad Bakour		(Syrian Football Association) Homs Al-Jadid
19	MF	Zaid Mona		(Syrian Football Association) Hutteen
20	MF	Omar Turki	1 January 2009 (age 17)	(United Arab Emirates Football Association) Al Nasr
21	MF	Farouk Shekh Khalil		(Syrian Football Association) Taliya
	FW	Ahmad Al-Hafi	4 January 2009 (age 17)	(Syrian Football Association) Al-Wahda
7	FW	Abdulhadi Al-Hariri	1 January 2009 (age 17)	(United Arab Emirates Football Association) Shabab Al Ahli
9	FW	Ahmad Al-Faraj	1 July 2009 (age 17)	(United Arab Emirates Football Association) Emirates
10	FW	Mohamad Al-Jasem		(Jordan Football Association) Jordan Knights
11	FW	Bashar Al-Hariri (captain)	7 January 2009 (age 17)	(Syrian Football Association) Al-Majd
12	FW	Mohammad Al-Mostafa		(United Arab Emirates Football Association) Shabab Al Ahli

== Competitive record ==
=== FIFA U-17 World Cup ===
FIFA U-17 World Cup
Year	Round	PLD	W	D*	L	GS	GA
(China) 1985	Did not qualify	-	-	-	-	-	-
(Canada) 1987	Did not enter	-	-	-	-	-	-
(Scotland) 1989	Did not enter	-	-	-	-	-	-
(Italy) 1991	Did not enter	-	-	-	-	-	-
(Japan) 1993	Did not enter	-	-	-	-	-	-
(Ecuador) 1995	Did not enter	-	-	-	-	-	-
(Egypt) 1997	Did not enter	-	-	-	-	-	-
(New Zealand) 1999	Did not enter	-	-	-	-	-	-
(Trinidad and Tobago) 2001	Did not enter	-	-	-	-	-	-
(Finland) 2003	Did not qualify	-	-	-	-	-	-
(Peru) 2005	Did not enter	-	-	-	-	-	-
(South Korea) 2007	Round of 16	4	1	1	2	4	5
(Nigeria) 2009	Did not qualify	-	-	-	-	-	-
(Mexico) 2011	Did not qualify	-	-	-	-	-	-
(United Arab Emirates) 2013	Did not qualify	-	-	-	-	-	-
(Chile) 2015	Group stage	3	0	1	2	1	8
(India) 2017	Did not qualify	-	-	-	-	-	-
(Brazil) 2019	Did not qualify	-	-	-	-	-	-
(Peru) ~~2021~~	Did not qualify	-	-	-	-	-	-
(Indonesia) 2023	Did not qualify	-	-	-	-	-	-
(Qatar) 2025	Did not qualify						
Total		7	1	2	4	5	13

FIFA U-17 World Cup History
Year	Round	Score	Result
2007	Round 1	Syria 0 – 0 Argentina	Draw
2007	Round 1	Syria 1 – 2 Spain	Lost
2007	Round 1	Syria 2 – 0 Honduras	Won
2007	Round of 16	Syria 1 – 3 England	Lost
2015	Round 1	Syria 1 – 4 Paraguay	Lost
2015	Round 1	Syria 0 – 0 New Zealand	Draw
2015	Round 1	Syria 0 – 4 France	Lost

=== AFC U-17 Asian Cup ===
Year	Round	PLD	W	D	L	GF	GA
(Qatar) 1985	Did not qualify						
(Qatar) 1986	Did not enter						
(Thailand) 1988	Did not enter						
(United Arab Emirates) 1990	Did not enter						
(Saudi Arabia) 1992	Did not enter						
(Qatar) 1994	Did not enter						
(Thailand) 1996	Did not enter						
(Qatar) 1998	Did not enter						
(Vietnam) 2000	Did not enter						
(United Arab Emirates) 2002	Quarter-finals	4	1	1	2	3	4
(Japan) 2004	Did not enter						
(Singapore) 2006	Fourth Place	6	3	1	2	14	7
(Uzbekistan) 2008	Quarter-finals	4	2	1	1	6	4
(Uzbekistan) 2010	Quarter-finals	4	1	2	1	4	4
(Iran) 2012	Quarter-finals	4	1	2	1	3	3
(Thailand) 2014	Semi-finals	5	2	2	1	9	11
(India) 2016	Did not qualify						
(Malaysia) 2018	Did not qualify						
(Thailand) 2023	Did not qualify						
(Saudi Arabia) 2025	Did not qualify						
(Saudi Arabia) 2026	Did not qualify						
(Uzbekistan) 2027	Qualified						
Total	7/22	27	10	9	8	39	33

AFC U-17 Championship History
Year	Round	Score	Result
2002	Round 1	Syria 1 – 0 Qatar	Won
2002	Round 1	Syria 1 – 1 Uzbekistan	Draw
2002	Round 1	Syria 0 – 1 Japan	Lost
2002	Quarter-finals	Syria 1 – 2 Yemen	Lost
2006	Round 1	Syria 0 – 1 China	Lost
2006	Round 1	Syria 7 – 0 Bangladesh	Won
2006	Round 1	Syria 2 – 0 Vietnam	Won
2006	Quarter-finals	Syria 2 – 1 Saudi Arabia	Won
2006	Semi-finals	Syria 0 – 2 Japan	Lost
2006	Third Place	Syria 3 – 3 Tajikistan	Draw
2008	Round 1	Syria 2 – 1 Indonesia	Won
2008	Round 1	Syria 3 – 0 India	Won
2008	Round 1	Syria 1 – 1 South Korea	Draw
2008	Quarter-finals	Syria 0 – 2 Iran	Lost
2010	Round 1	Syria 1 – 1 North Korea	Draw
2010	Round 1	Syria 1 – 0 Oman	Won
2010	Round 1	Syria 1 – 1 Iran	Draw
2010	Quarter-finals	Syria 1 – 2 Uzbekistan	Lost
2012	Round 1	Syria 1 – 1 China	Draw
2012	Round 1	Syria 0 – 0 India	Draw
2012	Round 1	Syria 1 – 0 Uzbekistan	Won
2012	Quarter-finals	Syria 1 – 2 Japan	Lost
2014	Round 1	Syria 0 – 0 Saudi Arabia	Draw
2014	Round 1	Syria 1 – 1 Qatar	Draw
2014	Round 1	Syria 2 – 1 Iran	Won
2014	Quarter-finals	Syria 5 – 2 Uzbekistan	Won
2014	Semi-finals	Syria 1 – 7 South Korea	Lost

== Head-to-head record ==
The following table shows Syria's head-to-head record in the FIFA U-17 World Cup and AFC U-17 Asian Cup.

=== In FIFA U-17 World Cup ===
Opponent	Pld	W	D	L	GF	GA	GD	Win %
Argentina	1	0	1	0	0	0	+0	0.00
England	1	0	0	1	1	3	−2	0.00
France	1	0	0	1	0	4	−4	0.00
Honduras	1	1	0	0	2	0	+2	100.00
New Zealand	1	0	1	0	0	0	+0	0.00
Paraguay	1	0	0	1	1	4	−3	0.00
Spain	1	0	0	1	1	2	−1	0.00
Total	7	1	2	4	5	13	−8	14.29

=== In AFC U-17 Asian Cup ===
Opponent	Pld	W	D	L	GF	GA	GD	Win %
Bangladesh	1	1	0	0	7	0	+7	100.00
China	2	0	1	1	1	2	−1	0.00
India	2	1	1	0	3	0	+3	50.00
Indonesia	1	1	0	0	2	1	+1	100.00
Iran	3	1	1	1	3	4	−1	33.33
Japan	3	0	0	3	1	5	−4	0.00
North Korea	1	0	1	0	1	1	+0	0.00
Oman	1	1	0	0	1	0	+1	100.00
Qatar	2	1	1	0	2	1	+1	50.00
Saudi Arabia	2	1	1	0	2	1	+1	50.00
South Korea	2	0	1	1	2	8	−6	0.00
Tajikistan	1	0	1	0	3	3	+0	0.00
Uzbekistan	4	2	1	1	8	5	+3	50.00
Vietnam	1	1	0	0	2	0	+2	100.00
Yemen	1	0	0	1	1	2	−1	0.00
Total	27	10	9	8	39	33	+6	37.04

== See also ==
- Syria national football team
- Syria national under-23 football team
- Syria national under-20 football team
- Syrian Football Association
- Football in Syria
