= 2024–25 ES Mostaganem season =

ES Mostaganem
2024–25 season
- President: Taqi al-Din Bibi
- Head coach: Chérif Hadjar (from 1 July 2024) (until 11 November 2024); Slimane Raho (from 14 November 2024) (until 26 December 2024); Nadhir Leknaoui (from 30 December 2024)
- Stadium: Mohamed Bensaïd Stadium
- Ligue 1: 14th
- Algerian Cup: Quarter-finals
- Top goalscorer: League: Ramdane Hitala (6 goals); All: Ramdane Hitala (8 goals)

The 2024–25 season, is ES Mostaganem's 9th season in the top flight of Algerian football. On May 27, 2024, ES Mostaganem returned to the Ligue 1 after 25 years of waiting, by defeating ASM Oran. In addition to the domestic league, ES Mostaganem are participating in the Algerian Cup. On June 27, 2024, The federal office approved the calendar for the 2024–25 Ligue 1 season with the aim of ending on May 31, 2025. The first round is scheduled for September 14, this delay is motivated both by an extended end of the 2023–24 season but also by the holding of early presidential elections which will take place on September 7, 2024. However, the Ligue de Football Professionnel decided to postpone the start of the Ligue 1 by a week, on September 21.

The coffers of ES Mostaganem were replenished, with a subsidy of around 20 million dinars from the wilaya, while waiting for a similar sum to also be allocated to this promotion to Ligue 1 from the APC of Mostaganem. By this financial contribution, registered as “an exceptional motivation bonus” rewarding Espérance for its return among the Algerian elite after a wait of 25 years, the wali honors his commitment which he kept when he had received the champions of Ligue 2.

== Squad list ==
Players and squad numbers last updated on 5 February 2025.
Note: Flags indicate national team as has been defined under FIFA eligibility rules. Players may hold more than one non-FIFA nationality.

No.	Nat.	Name	Position	Date of birth (age)	Signed from
Goalkeepers
1	(Algeria)	Abdesslam Hannane	GK	23 September 1995 (aged 28)	(Algeria) ASM Oran
16	(Algeria)	Walid Ouabdi	GK	12 June 1995 (aged 29)	(Algeria) JS Saoura
40	(Algeria)	Mohammed Reyad Lezoul	GK	15 August 2004 (aged 20)	(Algeria) MC Oran U21
Defenders
2	(Algeria)	Mohamed Beghdadi	CB	7 March 2003 (aged 21)	(Algeria) Reserve team
3	(Algeria)	Abdelkader Tamimi	CB	20 March 2001 (aged 23)	(Algeria) MC Oran
4	(Algeria)	Benali Benamar	CB	12 January 1995 (aged 29)	(Algeria) JS Saoura
5	(Algeria)	Djamel Benlamri	CB	25 December 1989 (aged 35)	Unattached
12	(Algeria)	Boualem Mesmoudi	CB	15 April 1994 (aged 30)	(Algeria) ES Ben Aknoun
15	(Algeria)	Mohamed Amine Ezzemani	LB	27 November 1994 (aged 29)	(Morocco) MA Tétouan
20	(Algeria)	Riadh Dahmani	RB	25 November 1996 (aged 27)	(Algeria) NC Magra
21	(Algeria)	Khaled Chouari	CB	16 September 1995 (aged 28)	(Algeria) Unknown
27	(Algeria)	Abdellah Meddah	RB	8 March 1999 (aged 25)	(Algeria) USM Khenchela
Midfielders
6	(Algeria)	Mustapha Zeghnoun	AM	30 June 1991 (aged 33)	(Algeria) US Biskra
7	(Algeria)	Houcine Aoued	AM	21 April 1999 (aged 25)	(Algeria) Paradou AC
8	(Algeria)	Chakib Aoudjane	CM	23 June 1996 (aged 28)	(Algeria) ES Ben Aknoun
14	(Guinea)	Fode Camara	DM	12 June 2002 (aged 22)	(Tunisia) CS Sfaxien
18	(Algeria)	Omar Embarek	DM	11 November 1998 (aged 26)	(Algeria) USM Alger
24	(Algeria)	Noureddine Hamri	DM	28 June 1994 (aged 30)	(Algeria) MC El Bayadh
Forwards
9	(Algeria)	Fodil Belkhadem	CF	25 January 2002 (aged 22)	(Algeria) CR Belouizdad
10	(Algeria)	Fouad Ghanem	LW	16 November 1997 (aged 26)	(Algeria) ES Sétif
11	(Algeria)	Chérif Siam	RW	1 May 1995 (aged 29)	(Algeria) US Biskra
13	(Democratic Republic of the Congo)	Ducapel Moloko	RW	25 December 1997 (aged 26)	(Algeria) Diyala SC
17	(Algeria)	Ramdane Hitala	CF	8 February 1995 (aged 29)	(Algeria) ES Sétif
19	(Algeria)	Akram Bibi	ST	11 April 2003 (aged 21)	(Algeria) Reserve team
22	(Algeria)	Ameur Bouguettaya	LW	21 July 1995 (aged 29)	(Algeria) MC Oran
23	(Algeria)	Yasser Belaribi	LW	22 January 1999 (aged 25)	(Algeria) MC El Bayadh
26	(Algeria)	Nizar Tamer	RW	31 July 2001 (aged 23)	(Algeria) US Biskra

== Transfers ==
=== In ===
==== Summer ====
Date	Pos	Player	Moving from	Fee	Source
10 July 2024	RB	(Algeria) Abdellah Meddah	USM Khenchela	Free transfer	
10 July 2024	CB	(Algeria) Adel Amaouche	MC El Bayadh	Free transfer	
11 July 2024	AM	(Algeria) Chakib Aoudjane	ES Ben Aknoun	Free transfer	
17 July 2024	CM	(Algeria) Toufik Addadi	ASO Chlef	Free transfer	
17 July 2024	GK	(Algeria) Mohamed Alaouchiche	ASO Chlef	Free transfer	
18 July 2024	CB	(Algeria) Abdelkader Tamimi	MC Oran	Free transfer	
18 July 2024	RW	(Algeria) Chérif Siam	US Biskra	Free transfer	
18 July 2024	RW	(Algeria) Nizar Tamer	US Biskra	Free transfer	
18 July 2024	ST	(Algeria) Hani Gasmi	SKAF Khemis Miliana	Free transfer	
28 July 2024	CB	(Algeria) Yacine Zeghad	ES Sétif	Free transfer	
28 July 2024	CF	(Algeria) Ramdane Hitala	ES Sétif	Free transfer	
29 July 2024	AM	(Algeria) Mustapha Zeghnoun	US Biskra	Free transfer	
30 July 2024	GK	(Algeria) Mohammed Reyad Lezoul	MC Oran U21	Free transfer	
7 August 2024	CF	(Algeria) Mohammed Fodil Belkhadem	CR Belouizdad	Free transfer	
10 August 2024	CB	(Algeria) Boualem Mesmoudi	ES Ben Aknoun	Free transfer	
10 August 2024	CB	(Algeria) Benali Benamar	JS Saoura	Free transfer	
10 August 2024	DM	(Algeria) Aziz Benabdi	ES Ben Aknoun	Free transfer	
17 August 2024	LB	(Algeria) Mohamed Amine Ezzemani	(Morocco) MA Tétouan	Free transfer	
18 August 2024	LW	(Algeria) Yasser Belaribi	MC El Bayadh	Free transfer	

==== Winter ====
Date	Pos	Player	Moving from	Fee	Source
2 January 2025	CB	(Algeria) Djamel Benlamri	Unattached	Free transfer	
3 February 2025	DM	(Algeria) Omar Embarek	USM Alger	Six months loan	

=== Out ===
==== Summer ====
Date	Pos	Player	Moving to	Fee	Source
13 July 2024	AM	(Algeria) Oussama Daibeche	CR Belouizdad	Free transfer	
14 July 2024	FW	(Algeria) Abdel-Touab Ali Hadji	ES Sétif	Free transfer	
31 July 2024	RW	(Algeria) Moussa Boukhena	ASO Chlef	Free transfer	

==== Winter ====
Date	Pos	Player	Moving to	Fee	Source
2 January 2025	CM	(Algeria) Toufik Addadi	(Algeria) Olympique Akbou	Free transfer	

== Competitions ==
=== Overview ===
Competition	Record								Started round	Final position / round	First match	Last match
Competition	G	W	D	L	GF	GA	GD	Win %	Started round	Final position / round	First match	Last match
Ligue 1	30	8	10	12	23	31	−8	26.67	—N/a	14th	28 September 2024	21 June 2025
Algerian Cup	4	2	2	0	6	4	+2	50.00	Round of 64	Quarter-finals	3 January 2025	26 March 2025
Total	34	10	12	12	29	35	−6	29.41				

Updated to match played 21 June 2025
Source: Competitions

=== Ligue 1 ===
==== League table ====
Pos	Team	Pld	W	D	L	GF	GA	GD	Pts	Qualification or relegation
12	MC El Bayadh	30	9	9	12	23	26	−3	36	
13	ASO Chlef	30	7	13	10	24	27	−3	34	
14	ES Mostaganem	30	8	10	12	23	31	−8	34	
15	NC Magra (R)	30	7	10	13	23	35	−12	31	Relegation to Algerian Ligue 2
16	US Biskra (R)	30	3	11	16	12	31	−19	20	Relegation to Algerian Ligue 2

Source: the-sports.org
Rules for classification: 1) points; 2) head-to-head points; 3) head-to-head goal difference; 4) goal difference; 5) total goals; 6) fairplay ranking; 7) playoff.
(R) Relegated

==== Results summary ====
Overall								Home						Away					
Pld	W	D	L	GF	GA	GD	Pts	W	D	L	GF	GA	GD	W	D	L	GF	GA	GD
30	8	10	12	23	31	−8	34	6	6	3	12	10	+2	2	4	9	11	21	−10

Last updated: 21 June 2025.
Source: Competitive matches

==== Results by round ====
Round	1	2	3	4	5	6	7	8	9	10	11	12	13	14	15	16	17	18	19	20	21	22	23	24	25	26	27	28	29	30
Ground	A	H	A	H	A	H	A	H	A	H	A	A	H	A	H	H	A	H	A	H	A	H	A	H	A	H	H	A	H	A
Result	D	W	L	L	L	W	W	L	L	D	D	L	D	L	L	D	L	W	L	W	D	D	L	W	D	D	W	L	D	W
Position	9	3	10	11	14	10	8	9	12	12	13	13	14	14	15	15	16	15	16	14	14	14	15	13	15	14	14	14	14	14

Updated to match(es) played on 21 June 2025. Source: Competitive matches
A = Away; H = Home; W = Win; D = Draw; L = Loss

==== Matches ====
The league fixtures were announced on 11 July 2024.

All times are local, WAT (UTC+1).

Win Draw Loss Postponed

28 September 2024 Round 2	ES Mostaganem	2–1	MC Oran	Mostaganem
18:00	Addadi 51' (pen.); Hitala 70'	Report	Aguieb 42'	Stadium: Mohamed Bensaïd Stadium; Attendance: 0 (close doors); Referee: Lahlou Benbraham; VAR: Yahia Dehar

2 October 2024 Round 1	CS Constantine	0–0	ES Mostaganem	Mila
16:00		Report		Stadium: Belkacem Belaid Stadium; Attendance: 0 (close doors); Referee: Abdelali Ibrir

6 October 2024 Round 3	USM Khenchela	2–0	ES Mostaganem	Khenchela
16:00	Bakir 20', 78'	Report		Stadium: Amar Hamam Stadium; Referee: Lotfi Bekouassa

18 October 2024 Round 5	ES Sétif	1–0	ES Mostaganem	Sétif
18:00	Mouley 68' (pen.)	Report		Stadium: 8 May 1945 Stadium; Attendance: 0 (close doors); Referee: Rafik Aouina

22 October 2024 (Note: The match between ES Mostaganem and USM Alger is postponed from October 12, to October 22, 2024, due to the presence of three players from USM Alger with their national teams, Benbot and Radouani with Algeria and Terrazas with Bolivia.) Round 4	ES Mostaganem	0–1	USM Alger	Mostaganem
17:30		Report	Gassama 26'	Stadium: Mohamed Bensaïd Stadium; Referee: Youcef Gamouh; VAR: Youcef Taieb Bouderbal

26 October 2024 Round 6	ES Mostaganem	1–0	US Biskra	Mostaganem
17:45	Hitala 21'	Report		Stadium: Mohamed Bensaïd Stadium; Referee: Hamza Bouslimani

3 November 2024 Round 7	Olympique Akbou	1–2	ES Mostaganem	Béjaïa
17:30	Ouassa 59'	Report	Aoudjane 72', 86'	Stadium: Maghrebi Unity Stadium; Referee: Lotfi Bekouassa

9 November 2024 Round 8	ES Mostaganem	0–2	CR Belouizdad	Mostaganem
18:00		Report	Benguit 76', 90+5'	Stadium: Mohamed Bensaïd Stadium; Referee: Alaa Bouab

16 November 2024 Round 9	NC Magra	1–0	ES Mostaganem	Magra
15:00	Amrane 16'	Report		Stadium: Boucheligue Brothers Stadium; Referee: Fateh Harkat

23 November 2024 Round 10	ES Mostaganem	1–1	JS Saoura	Mostaganem
16:00	Ghanem 84'	Report	Saadi 19'	Stadium: Mohamed Bensaïd Stadium; Referee: Tahar Boudjemaa; VAR: Mustapha Ghorbal

30 November 2024 Round 11	MC El Bayadh	1–1	ES Mostaganem	El Bayadh
15:00	Toumi Sief 80'	Report	Belkhadem 82'	Stadium: Zakaria Medjdoub Stadium; Referee: Ayoub Belhachemi

7 December 2024 Round 12	ASO Chlef	2–0	ES Mostaganem	Chlef
15:00	Agbagno 45+3'; Sadahine 90+6'	Report		Stadium: Mohamed Boumezrag Stadium; Referee: Mustapha Ghorbal; VAR: Redouane Allou

21 December 2024 Round 14	JS Kabylie	2–1	ES Mostaganem	Tizi Ouzou
17:00	Boudebouz 8'; Boualia 63'	Report	Belkhadem 80'	Stadium: Hocine Aït Ahmed Stadium; Referee: Houssam Benyahia; VAR: Anes Azrine

26 December 2024 Round 15	ES Mostaganem	0–2	Paradou AC	Mostaganem
17:00		Report	Boulbina 9', 89'	Stadium: Mohamed Bensaïd Stadium; Referee: Mehdi Oukil

2 February 2025 Round 13	ES Mostaganem	1–1	MC Alger	Mostaganem
16:00	Benamar 50'	Report	Abdellaoui 9'	Stadium: Mohamed Bensaïd Stadium; Attendance: 0 (close doors); Referee: Fateh Harkat; VAR: Nabil Boukhalfa

13 February 2025 Round 16	ES Mostaganem	0–0	CS Constantine	Mostaganem
16:00		Report		Stadium: Mohamed Bensaïd Stadium; Attendance: 0 (close doors); Referee: Mustapha Ghorbal; VAR: Youcef Taieb Bouderbal

19 February 2025 Round 17	MC Oran	1–0	ES Mostaganem	Bir El Djir
17:00	Moulay 26'	Report		Stadium: Miloud Hadefi Stadium; Attendance: 0 (close doors); Referee: Akram Mechairia; VAR: Yahia Dehar

25 February 2025 Round 18	ES Mostaganem	2–0	USM Khenchela	Mostaganem
18:00	Aoudjane 21'; Siam 34'	Report		Stadium: Mohamed Bensaïd Stadium; Attendance: 0 (close doors); Referee: Lahlou Benbraham; VAR: Tahar Boudjemaa

6 March 2025 Round 19	USM Alger	1–0	ES Mostaganem	Baraki
22:00	Benlamri 32' (o.g.)	Report		Stadium: Nelson Mandela Stadium; Referee: Tahar Boudjemaa; VAR: Youcef Taieb Bouderbal

14 March 2025 Round 20	ES Mostaganem	1–0	ES Sétif	Mostaganem
22:00	Hitala 52'	Report		Stadium: Mohamed Bensaïd Stadium; Attendance: 0 (close doors); Referee: Mehdi Oukil

4 April 2025 Round 21	US Biskra	0–0	ES Mostaganem	Biskra
16:00		Report		Stadium: 18 February Stadium; Attendance: 0 (close doors); Referee: Anes Azrine; VAR: Redouane Allou

10 April 2025 Round 22	ES Mostaganem	1–1	Olympique Akbou	Mostaganem
19:00	Hitala 51'	Report	Zamoum 34'	Stadium: Mohamed Bensaïd Stadium; Attendance: 0 (close doors); Referee: Youcef Gamouh; VAR: Fateh Harkat

19 April 2025 Round 23	CR Belouizdad	3–2	ES Mostaganem	Baraki
17:00	Mahious 87', 89'; Hamroune 90+6'	Report	Hitala 37', 79'	Stadium: Nelson Mandela Stadium; Attendance: 0 (close doors); Referee: Ayoub Belhachemi

26 April 2025 Round 24	ES Mostaganem	2–1	NC Magra	Mostaganem
16:00	Benlamri 24'; Bouguettaya 86'	Report	H.Demane 90+5'	Stadium: Mohamed Bensaïd Stadium; Referee: Haitham Ghouti

10 May 2025 Round 25	JS Saoura	0–0	ES Mostaganem	Béchar
18:00		Report		Stadium: 20 August 1955 Stadium; Referee: Lotfi Bekouassa

18 May 2025 Round 26	ES Mostaganem	0–0	MC El Bayadh	Mostaganem
16:00		Report		Stadium: Mohamed Bensaïd Stadium; Referee: Fateh Harkat; VAR: Anes Azrine

25 May 2025 Round 27	ES Mostaganem	1–0	ASO Chlef	Mostaganem
17:00	Aoudjane 42'	Report		Stadium: Mohamed Bensaïd Stadium; Referee: Lahlou Benbraham; VAR: Nabil Boukhalfa

12 June 2025 Round 28	MC Alger	5–2	ES Mostaganem	Algiers
21:00	Bangoura 5', 86' (pen.); Zunon 22'; Tabti 71'; Bayazid 90+4'	Report	Aoudjane 43'; Tamimi 68'	Stadium: Stade du 5 Juillet; Referee: Haitham Ghouti; VAR: Lotfi Bekouassa

16 June 2025 Round 29	ES Mostaganem	0–0	JS Kabylie	Mostaganem
20:00		Report		Stadium: Mohamed Bensaïd Stadium; Referee: Youcef Gamouh; VAR: Yahia Dehar

21 June 2025 Round 30	Paradou AC	1–3	ES Mostaganem	Blida
17:45	Sais 45+3'	Report	Mesmoudi 3'; Aoudjane 17'; Bouguettaya 77'	Stadium: Mustapha Tchaker Stadium; Referee: Alaa Bouab; VAR: Tahar Boudjemaa

=== Algerian Cup ===
3 January 2025 Round of 64	ES Mostaganem	1–1 (a.e.t.) (5–4 p)	WAB Tissemssilt	Mostaganem
16:00	Belaribi 83'	Report	Goushi 60'	Stadium: Mohamed Bensaïd Stadium; Referee: Mehadji Tayeb Bouderbal

11 January 2025 Round of 32	ES Mostaganem	2–1 (a.e.t.)	JSM Tiaret	Mostaganem
16:00	Hitala 18', 120'	Report	Hamadi 54'	Stadium: Mohamed Bensaïd Stadium; Referee: Smain Hamlet

6 February 2025 Round of 16	US Biskra	1–2 (a.e.t.)	ES Mostaganem	Biskra
16:00	Dadache 42'	Report	Belkhadem 13', 114'	Stadium: 18 February Stadium; Referee: Abdelali Ibrir

26 March 2025 Quarter-finals	USM El Harrach	1–1 (a.e.t.) (2–0 p)	ES Mostaganem	Algiers
22:20	Abid 26'	Report	Mesmoudi 62'	Stadium: Stade du 5 Juillet; Referee: Alaa Bouab; VAR: Akram Mechairia
	Penalties
	Chouki (penalty scored); Ferhat (penalty missed); Bouderbala (penalty scored)		(penalty missed) Tamer; (penalty missed) Meddah; (penalty missed) Hamri; (penalty missed) Hitala

== Squad information ==
=== Appearances and goals ===
As of 21 June 2025

No.	Pos	Player	Nat	Ligue 1			Algerian Cup			Total		
No.	Pos	Player	Nat	App	St	G	App	St	G	App	St	G
Goalkeepers
1	GK	Abdesslam Hannane	(Algeria)	21	21	0	3	2	0	24	23	0
16	GK	Walid Ouabdi	(Algeria)	8	8	0	2	2	0	10	10	0
40	GK	Mohammed Reyad Lezoul	(Algeria)	0	0	0	0	0	0	0	0	0
Defenders
2	CB	Mohamed Beghdadi	(Algeria)	0	0	0	0	0	0	0	0	0
3	CB	Abdelkader Tamimi	(Algeria)	14	11	1	2	1	0	16	12	1
4	CB	Benali Benamar	(Algeria)	28	27	1	4	3	0	32	30	1
5	CB	Djamel Benlamri	(Algeria)	13	13	1	2	2	0	15	15	1
12	CB	Boualem Mesmoudi	(Algeria)	21	17	1	3	3	1	24	20	2
15	LB	Mohamed Amine Ezzemani	(Algeria)	24	20	0	4	4	0	28	24	0
20	RB	Riadh Dahmani	(Algeria)	16	11	0	3	3	0	19	14	0
21	CB	Khaled Chouari	(Algeria)	12	7	0	1	0	0	13	7	0
27	RB	Abdellah Meddah	(Algeria)	24	23	0	4	3	0	28	26	0
Midfielders
6	AM	Mustapha Zeghnoun	(Algeria)	22	16	0	3	3	0	25	19	0
7	AM	Houcine Aoued	(Algeria)	2	0	0	0	0	0	2	0	0
8	CM	Chakib Aoudjane	(Algeria)	30	26	5	4	4	0	34	30	5
14	DM	Fodé Camara	(Guinea)	13	11	0	1	1	0	14	12	0
18	DM	Omar Embarek	(Algeria)	13	12	0	0	0	0	13	12	0
24	DM	Noureddine Hamri	(Algeria)	20	6	0	1	1	0	21	7	0
Forwards
9	CF	Fodil Belkhadem	(Algeria)	16	6	2	3	2	2	19	8	4
10	LW	Fouad Ghanem	(Algeria)	6	1	1	2	0	0	8	1	1
11	RW	Chérif Siam	(Algeria)	20	14	1	4	3	0	24	17	1
13	RW	Ducapel Moloko	(Democratic Republic of the Congo)	7	1	0	1	0	0	8	1	0
17	CF	Ramdane Hitala	(Algeria)	23	21	6	2	2	2	25	23	8
19	ST	Akram Abou Bakr Bibi	(Algeria)	12	3	0	3	0	0	15	3	0
22	LW	Ameur Bouguettaya	(Algeria)	21	12	2	4	2	0	25	14	2
23	LW	Yasser Belaribi	(Algeria)	18	8	0	4	2	1	22	10	1
26	RW	Nizar Tamer	(Algeria)	17	4	0	4	1	0	21	5	0
Players transferred out during the season
~~16~~	GK	Mohamed Alaouchiche	(Algeria)	1	1	0	0	0	0	1	1	0
~~18~~	CM	Toufik Addadi	(Algeria)	12	12	1	0	0	0	12	12	1
~~5~~	CB	Yacine Zeghad	(Algeria)	1	0	0	0	0	0	1	0	0
~~13~~	DM	Aziz Benabdi	(Algeria)	10	9	0	0	0	0	10	9	0
~~14~~	ST	Hani Gasmi	(Algeria)	10	4	0	1	0	0	11	4	0
Total				30		23	4		6	34		29

Last updated: 21 June 2025
Source: mondefootball.fr

=== Goalscorers ===
As of 21 June 2025

Includes all competitive matches.

No.	Nat.	Player	Pos.	L1	AC	TOTAL
17	(Algeria)	Ramdane Hitala	CF	6	2	8
8	(Algeria)	Chakib Aoudjane	CM	5	0	5
17	(Algeria)	Fodil Belkhadem	CF	2	2	4
22	(Algeria)	Ameur Bouguettaya	LW	2	0	2
12	(Algeria)	Boualem Mesmoudi	CB	1	1	2
10	(Algeria)	Fouad Ghanem	LW	1	0	1
11	(Algeria)	Chérif Siam	RW	1	0	1
4	(Algeria)	Benali Benamar	CB	1	0	1
3	(Algeria)	Abdelkader Tamimi	CB	1	0	1
5	(Algeria)	Djamel Benlamri	CB	1	0	1
18	(Algeria)	Toufik Addadi	CM	1	0	1
23	(Algeria)	Yasser Belaribi	LW	0	1	1
Own Goals				0	0	0
Totals				23	6	29

=== Clean sheets ===
As of 21 June 2025

					Clean sheets		
No.	Nat	Name	GP	GA	L1	AC	Total
1	(Algeria)	Abdesslam Hannane	24	25	6	0	6
16	(Algeria)	Walid Ouabdi	10	8	4	0	4
40	(Algeria)	Mohammed Reyad Lezoul	0	0	0	0	0
Players transferred out during the season
16	(Algeria)	Mohamed Alaouchiche	1	2	0	0	0
		TOTALS		35	10	0	10
