= 2022 Arab Cup U-17 =

كأس العرب تحت 17 عام 2022
- Official poster of the tournament

Tournament details
- Host country: Algeria
- Dates: 23 August – 8 September
- Teams: 16 (from 2 confederations)
- Venues: 2 (in 2 host cities)

Final positions
- Champions: Algeria (1st title)
- Runners-up: Morocco

Tournament statistics
- Matches played: 31
- Goals scored: 87 (2.81 per match)
- Top scorer: (Saudi Arabia) Talal Haji (7 goals)
- Best player: (Algeria) Meslem Anatof
- Best goalkeeper: (Morocco) Taha Belghzal

The 2022 Arab Cup U-17 (Arabic: كأس العرب تحت 17 سنة 2022) is the fourth edition of the Arab Cup U-17, an association football tournament between Arab countries. It will be played from 23 August to 8 September 2022 in Algeria in Oran which represent the administrative organization of the tournament, and two other cities, Sig and Mostaganem which they holds each ones the football matches.

Iraq won the previous tournament in 2014, but were eliminated in the quarter-finals. Host Algeria won the tournament for the first time after beating Morocco on penalties 4–2.

== Teams ==
16 teams took part to the tournament. The draw took place on 31 July 2022 in Abha, Saudi Arabia.

Team	Appearance	Last appearance	Previous best performance
Algeria	3rd	2011	Fourth place
Comoros	1st	debut	
Egypt	1st	debut	
Iraq	4th	2014	Winners
Lebanon	1st	debut	
Libya	2nd	2012	Group stage
Mauritania	3rd	2014	Group stage
Morocco	3rd	2012	Third place
Oman	2nd	2012	Group stage
Palestine	3rd	2014	Group stage
Saudi Arabia	4th	2014	Winners
Sudan	4th	2011	Third place
Syria	2nd	2011	Runners-up
Tunisia	2nd	2012	Winners
United Arab Emirates	1st	debut	
Yemen	2nd	2012	Fourth place

Bahrain, Djibouti, Jordan, Kuwait, Qatar and Somalia did not enter.

=== Seedings ===
Pot 1	Pot 2	Pot 3	Pot 4
1. Algeria (hosts); 2. Morocco; 3. Egypt; 4. Tunisia	5. Saudi Arabia; 6. United Arab Emirates; 7. Iraq; 8. Oman	9. Lebanon; 10. Palestine; 11. Mauritania; 12. Libya	13. Comoros; 14. Sudan; 15. Yemen; 16. Syria

== Venues ==
The city of Oran hosts the tournament but two stadiums from two other cities, Sig and Mostaganem were allocated to host the matches.

: Administrative venue : Football matches venues	Sig
: Administrative venue : Football matches venues	Abdelkrim Kerroum Stadium
: Administrative venue : Football matches venues	Capacity: 20,000
: Administrative venue : Football matches venues	Mostaganem
: Administrative venue : Football matches venues	Mohamed Bensaïd Stadium
: Administrative venue : Football matches venues	Capacity: 18,000

== Officiating ==
=== Referees ===
- (Algeria) Elias Bekouassa
- (Egypt) Mahmoud Nagy
- (Iraq) Mohamed Salman
- (Jordan) Usama Hasan
- (Kuwait) Ammar Ashkanani
- (Lebanon) Maher El Ali
- (Libya) Ahmed Al-Zaruq
- (Morocco) Mostafa Kachef
- (Oman) Mahmoud Salem Hameed
- (Palestine) Mohammed Abu Shahla
- (Saudi Arabia) Shukri Al-Hanfush
- (Sudan) Ameen Al-Hadi
- (Syria) Muhammad Suleiman Kanat
- (Tunisia) Mohamed Yousri Bouali
- (United Arab Emirates) Yahya Al-Mulla
- (Yemen) Mokhtar Al-Arami

=== Assistant referees ===
- (Algeria) Mohamed Serradj
- (Algeria) Brahim Hamlaoui
- (Comoros) Abdelmajid El-Zalan
- (Egypt) Hany Abdelfattah
- (Iraq) Hussein Falah Munshid
- (Lebanon) Ali Berri
- (Libya) Monji Abu Shikiwa
- (Mauritania) Ahmed Ibrahim
- (Morocco) Hamza Naciri
- (Oman) Nasser Saidi
- (Palestine) Khaldun Abu Qbita
- (Saudi Arabia) Faisal Al-Qahtani
- (Somalia) Muleed Rajah Ali
- (Sudan) Naji Al-Fateh
- (Syria) Mohammad Qazzaz
- (Tunisia) Youssef El-Jami

== Group stage ==
The group winners and the two best second-placed teams advance to the quarter-finals.

=== Group A ===
Pos	Team	Pld	W	D	L	GF	GA	GD	Pts	Qualification
1	Algeria (H)	3	3	0	0	10	0	+10	9	Advance to knockout stage
2	Sudan	3	2	0	1	5	2	+3	6	Advance to knockout stage
3	United Arab Emirates	3	0	1	2	0	5	−5	1	
4	Palestine	3	0	1	2	0	8	−8	1	

Source: UAFA
(H) Hosts
23 August 2022
17:00

Algeria	5–0	Palestine
Ziad 3'; Kahlouchi 62'; Issam 65'; Boualem 82'; Anatof 88'

Abdelkrim Kerroum Stadium, Sig
Referee: Mahmoud Salem Hameed (Oman)
23 August 2022
17:00

United Arab Emirates	0–2	Sudan
		Musa 40', 58'

Mohamed Bensaïd Stadium, Mostaganem

26 August 2022
20:00

Palestine	0–0	United Arab Emirates

Mohamed Bensaïd Stadium, Mostaganem
Referee: Mohamed Yousri Bouali (Tunisia)
26 August 2022
20:00

Sudan	0–2	Algeria
		Badani 11'; Ziad 50' (pen.)

Abdelkrim Kerroum Stadium, Sig
Referee: Mohamed Salman (Iraq)

29 August 2022
17:00

Algeria	3–0	United Arab Emirates
Abdelmoudjib 12'; Kessassi 34'; Anatof 86'

Abdelkrim Kerroum Stadium, Sig
Referee: Muhammad Suleiman Kanat (Syria)
29 August 2022
17:00

Sudan	3–0	Palestine
Musab 16'; Musa 51' (pen.); Munzer 62'

Mohamed Bensaïd Stadium, Mostaganem

=== Group B ===
Pos	Team	Pld	W	D	L	GF	GA	GD	Pts	Qualification
1	Yemen	3	1	2	0	5	2	+3	5	Advance to knockout stage
2	Tunisia	3	1	2	0	3	2	+1	5 (Note: Disciplinary points: Tunisia 0; Libya –5)	Advance to knockout stage
3	Libya	3	1	2	0	3	2	+1	5	
4	Oman	3	0	0	3	2	7	−5	0	

Source: UAFA
Notes:
23 August 2022
20:00

Tunisia	0–0	Libya

Abdelkrim Kerroum Stadium, Sig
23 August 2022
20:00

Oman	0–3	Yemen
		Al-Khidr 24'; Abdul-Nabi 42', 62'

Mohamed Bensaïd Stadium, Mostaganem

26 August 2022
17:00

Libya	2–1	Oman
Al-Zaqouzi 52'; Al-Mabrouk 69'		Al-Mushaykhani 48'

Mohamed Bensaïd Stadium, Mostaganem
26 August 2022
17:00

Yemen	1–1	Tunisia
Al-Hindi 55'		Argui 19'

Abdelkrim Kerroum Stadium, Sig

29 August 2022
20:00

Tunisia	2–1	Oman
Amdouni 1'; Guizani 49'		Ben Hassine 37' (o.g.)

Abdelkrim Kerroum Stadium, Sig
Referee: Maher Al-Ula (Lebanon)
29 August 2022
20:00

Yemen	1–1	Libya
Tariki 19'		Al-Mabrouk 77'

Mohamed Bensaïd Stadium, Mostaganem

=== Group C ===
Pos	Team	Pld	W	D	L	GF	GA	GD	Pts	Qualification
1	Iraq	3	2	1	0	5	3	+2	7	Advance to knockout stage
2	Morocco	3	2	0	1	3	2	+1	6	Advance to knockout stage
3	Comoros	3	1	0	2	4	5	−1	3	
4	Mauritania	3	0	1	2	3	5	−2	1	

Source: UAFA
24 August 2022
17:00

Morocco	1–2	Iraq
Amine 45+1'		Akbar 43'; Jaafar 45+3'

Abdelkrim Kerroum Stadium, Sig
24 August 2022
17:00

Comoros	3–2	Mauritania
Imam 50'; Mohamed 60', 90'		Abderrahmane 41', 88'

Mohamed Bensaïd Stadium, Mostaganem

27 August 2022
20:00

Iraq	2–1	Comoros
Akbar 27', 65'		Salem 60' (o.g.)

Mohamed Bensaïd Stadium, Mostaganem
27 August 2022
20:00

Mauritania	0–1	Morocco
		Rachidi 12'

Abdelkrim Kerroum Stadium, Sig

30 August 2022
17:00

Morocco	1–0	Comoros
Chakir 83'

Abdelkrim Kerroum Stadium, Sig
30 August 2022
17:00

Mauritania	1–1	Iraq
Ba 7' (pen.)		Jassim 68' (pen.)

Mohamed Bensaïd Stadium, Mostaganem
Referee: Ameen Al-Hadi (Sudan)

=== Group D ===
Pos	Team	Pld	W	D	L	GF	GA	GD	Pts	Qualification
1	Egypt	3	3	0	0	17	0	+17	9	Advance to knockout stage
2	Saudi Arabia	3	2	0	1	10	6	+4	6	Advance to knockout stage
3	Syria	3	0	1	2	3	9	−6	1	
4	Lebanon	3	0	1	2	0	15	−15	1	

Source: UAFA
24 August 2022
20:00

Egypt	3–0	Saudi Arabia
Adel 18'; Khedr 47'; Abdel Aziz 70'

Abdelkrim Kerroum Stadium, Sig
24 August 2022
20:00

Syria	0–0	Lebanon
	Report

Mohamed Bensaïd Stadium, Mostaganem

27 August 2022
17:00

Saudi Arabia	4–3	Syria
Al-Yahibi 34'; Hazazi 41'; Haji 73'; Al-Bishri 82'		Issa 45', 50'; Dahan 68'

Mohamed Bensaïd Stadium, Mostaganem
27 August 2022
17:00

Lebanon	0–9	Egypt
	Report	Adel 23'; Magoub 52'; Abdel Karim 54'; Riyad 57'; Abdeen 65'; Khedr 69', 72'; Moawad 75'; El-Haddad 90+3'

Abdelkrim Kerroum Stadium, Sig

30 August 2022
20:00

Egypt	5–0	Syria
Abdel Aziz 8', 35'; Al Jabara 37' (o.g.); Boustenjy 69', 83'

Abdelkrim Kerroum Stadium, Sig
30 August 2022
20:00

Lebanon	0–6	Saudi Arabia
	Report	Al-Shamrani 3' (pen.); Al-Yahibi 37'; Haji 41', 52', 71'; Al-Bishri 90'

Mohamed Bensaïd Stadium, Mostaganem

== Knockout stage ==
=== Bracket ===
Quarter-finals
1 Sep − Mostaganem
Algeria (p)	1 (3)
Tunisia	1 (1)
2 Sep − Mostaganem
Iraq	1
Saudi Arabia	4
1 Sep − Mostaganem
Yemen	1
Sudan	0
2 Sep − Mostaganem
Egypt	0
Morocco	2

Semi-finals
5 Sep − Sig
Algeria (p)	0 (5)
Saudi Arabia	0 (4)
5 Sep − Sig
Yemen	0
Morocco	2

Final
8 Sep − Sig
Algeria (p)	1 (4)
Morocco	1 (2)

=== Quarter-finals ===
1 September 2022
16:30

Algeria	1–1	Tunisia
Abdelmoudjib 29'		Taboubi 57'
Penalties
Badani (penalty scored); Anatof (penalty scored); Kessassi (penalty scored); Bouaouiche (penalty missed)	3–1	(penalty missed) Amdouni; (penalty scored) Guizani; (penalty missed) Rabie; (penalty missed) Boukhris

Mohamed Bensaïd Stadium, Mostaganem
Referee: Yahya Al-Mulla (UAE)

1 September 2022
20:00

Yemen	1–0	Sudan
Tariki 26' (pen.)

Mohamed Bensaïd Stadium, Mostaganem
Referee: Elias Bekouassa (Algeria)

2 September 2022
16:30

Iraq	1–4	Saudi Arabia
Jassim 5'		Al-Jadaani 28'; Haji 45+2', 58', 66'

Mohamed Bensaïd Stadium, Mostaganem
Referee: Mahmoud Nagy (Egypt)

2 September 2022
20:00

Egypt	0–2	Morocco
		Maâli 81'; Naïr 90+2'

Mohamed Bensaïd Stadium, Mostaganem
Referee: Maher El Ali (Lebanon)

=== Semi-finals ===
5 September 2022
16:30

Algeria	0–0	Saudi Arabia
Penalties
Badani (penalty scored); Anatof (penalty scored); Karkour (penalty scored); Belgaïd (penalty scored); Kessassi (penalty scored)	5–4	(penalty scored) Al-Shamrani; (penalty scored) Al-Bishri; (penalty missed) Haji; (penalty scored) Al-Jadaani; (penalty scored) Al-Attar

Abdelkrim Kerroum Stadium, Sig
Referee: Muhammad Suleiman Kanat (Syria)

5 September 2022
20:00

Yemen	0–2	Morocco
		Boughizane 79'; El Rafei 90+5'

Abdelkrim Kerroum Stadium, Sig
Referee: Ammar Ashkanani (Kuwait)

=== Final ===
8 September 2022
20:00

Algeria	1–1	Morocco
Chehima 90'		Rachidi 51'
Penalties
Ziad (penalty missed); Badani (penalty scored); Anatof (penalty scored); Kessassi (penalty scored); Kahlouchi (penalty scored)	4–2	(penalty missed) Maâli; (penalty missed) Bakhti; (penalty scored) Bayad; (penalty scored) Katb

Abdelkrim Kerroum Stadium, Sig
Attendance: 20,000
Referee: Mahmoud Nagy (Egypt)

== Statistics ==
=== Goalscorers ===
There were 87 goals scored in 31 matches, for an average of 2.81 goals per match.

7 goals

- (Saudi Arabia) Talal Haji

3 goals

- (Egypt) Ayman Abdel Aziz
- (Egypt) Omar Khedr
- (Iraq) Ali Akbar
- (Sudan) Musa Hussein

2 goals

- (Algeria) Mohamed Abdelmoudjib
- (Algeria) Meslem Anatof
- (Algeria) Mohamed Ali Saleh Ziad
- (Comoros) Azad Mohamed
- (Egypt) Ibrahim Adel
- (Egypt) Ahmed Boustenjy
- (Iraq) Hassan Ali Jassim
- (Libya) Abdelmoumen Al-Mabrouk
- (Mauritania) Andou Abderrahmane
- (Morocco) Mohammed Rachidi
- (Saudi Arabia) Nawaf Al-Bishri
- (Saudi Arabia) Ammar Al-Yahibi
- (Syria) Kawa Issa
- (Yemen) Abdulrahman Abdul-Nabi
- (Yemen) Anwar Tariki

1 goal

- (Algeria) Younès Badani
- (Algeria) Elias Boualem
- (Algeria) Ismail Tayeb Chehima
- (Algeria) Yazid Issam
- (Algeria) Malik Kahlouchi
- (Algeria) Fethi Kessassi
- (Comoros) Kildi Imam
- (Egypt) Ahmed Abdin
- (Egypt) Hossam Abdel Karim
- (Egypt) Hisham El-Haddad
- (Egypt) Marwan Magoub
- (Egypt) Omar Moawad
- (Egypt) Ali Riyad
- (Iraq) Karrar Jaafar
- (Libya) Marwan Al-Zaqouzi
- (Mauritania) Sidy Ba
- (Morocco) Mohamed Amine
- (Morocco) Mouad Boughizane
- (Morocco) Adam Chakir
- (Morocco) Said El Rafei
- (Morocco) Abdelhamid Maâli
- (Morocco) Aymen Naïr
- (Oman) Al-Harith Al-Mushaykhani
- (Saudi Arabia) Nawaf Al-Jadaani
- (Saudi Arabia) Muhammad Hazazi
- (Saudi Arabia) Farha Al-Shamrani
- (Sudan) Musab Fadlallah
- (Sudan) Munzer Muhamed
- (Syria) Anas Dahan
- (Tunisia) Anas Amdouni
- (Tunisia) Abderrahmane Argui
- (Tunisia) Mohamed Karim Guizani
- (Tunisia) Akram Taboubi
- (Yemen) Mohammed Al-Hindi
- (Yemen) Abdulrahman Al-Khidr

1 own goal

- (Iraq) Ali Salem (against Comoros)
- (Syria) Majd Al Jabara (against Egypt)
- (Tunisia) Youcef Ben Hassine (against Oman)

Source: UAFA

== Broadcasting rights ==
The channels that will cover the competition are the two Algerian channels Algeria 6 and Algeria Web and also all the channels who are members of the Arab States Broadcasting Union (ASBU).
