= 2023 WAFF U-15 Championship =

بطولة اتحاد غرب آسيا العاشرة للناشئين

Tournament details
- Host country: Oman
- City: Salalah
- Dates: 11–20 December
- Teams: 8 (from 1 confederation)
- Venue: 1 (in 1 host city)

Final positions
- Champions: Yemen (2nd title)
- Runners-up: Saudi Arabia

Tournament statistics
- Matches played: 15
- Goals scored: 28 (1.87 per match)
- Top scorer: (Iraq) Zain Al-Abidin Jassim (4 goals)

The 2023 WAFF U-15 Championship was the tenth edition of the WAFF U-16 Championship, the annual international youth football championship organised by the WAFF for the men's under-15 national teams of West Asia. It was hosted by Oman for the first time. Eight national teams took part in the tournament.

Jordan were the defending champions but were eliminated at the group stages. Yemen won the second title, beating Saudi Arabia 3–2 on penalties.

== Participating nations ==
Eight nations from the WAFF participated in the tournament; Bahrain, Qatar, Kuwait and Palestine did not take part.

Team	Appearance	Last appearance	Previous best performance
Iraq	10th	2022	Champions (2013, 2015)
Jordan	10th	2022	Champions (2022)
Lebanon	6th	2022	Runners-up (2022)
Oman	3rd	2022	Fifth place (2019)
Saudi Arabia	4th	2021	Champions (2019)
Syria	7th	2022	Champions (2007)
United Arab Emirates	5th	2021	Runners-up (2013)
Yemen	6th	2022	Champions (2021)

== Group stage ==
The group winners and runners-up advanced to the semi-finals.

=== Group A ===
Pos	Team	Pld	W	D	L	GF	GA	GD	Pts	Qualification
1	Yemen	3	3	0	0	5	1	+4	9	Knockout stage
2	Iraq	3	1	1	1	5	3	+2	4	Knockout stage
3	Oman (H)	3	1	1	1	2	2	0	4	
4	Lebanon	3	0	0	3	0	6	−6	0	

Source: WAFF
(H) Hosts
11 December 2023
17:00

Iraq	1–2	Yemen
Waheed 26' (pen.)		Al-Khader 3' (pen.); Shamseddin 5'

Al-Saada Stadium, Salalah
11 December 2023
20:00

Oman	1–0	Lebanon
Al-Braidaei 53' (pen.)

Al-Saada Stadium, Salalah

13 December 2023
17:00

Lebanon	0–3	Iraq
		Abdulridha 34'; Jassim 51', 72'

Al-Saada Stadium, Salalah
13 December 2023
20:00

Yemen	1–0	Oman
Abdulnabi 26'

Al-Saada Stadium, Salalah

15 December 2023
17:00

Yemen	2–0	Lebanon
Al-Ward 73'; Atwi 75'

Al-Saada Stadium, Salalah
15 December 2023
20:00

Oman	1–1	Iraq
Al-Amiri 67' (o.g.)		Jassim 54'

Al-Saada Stadium, Salalah

=== Group B ===
Pos	Team	Pld	W	D	L	GF	GA	GD	Pts	Qualification
1	Saudi Arabia	3	1	2	0	4	2	+2	5	Knockout stage
2	United Arab Emirates	3	1	1	1	1	1	0	4 (Note: Head-to-head points: United Arab Emirates 3, Jordan 0.)	Knockout stage
3	Jordan	3	1	1	1	3	3	0	4	
4	Syria	3	1	0	2	1	3	−2	3	

Source: WAFF
Notes:
12 December 2023
17:00

Saudi Arabia	2–0	Syria
Sufyani 8'; Al-Awfi 45+4' (pen.)

Al-Saada Stadium, Salalah
12 December 2023
20:00

United Arab Emirates	1–0	Jordan
Bin Mahdi 41'

Al-Saada Stadium, Salalah

14 December 2023
17:00

Jordan	2–2	Saudi Arabia
Al-Tmaizi 20', 32'		Al-Awfi 47'; Hazazi 90+7'

Al-Saada Stadium, Salalah
14 December 2023
20:00

Syria	1–0	United Arab Emirates
Dinawi 83'

Al-Saada Stadium, Salalah

16 December 2023
17:00

Syria	0–1	Jordan
		Al-Masry 34'

Al-Saada Stadium, Salalah
16 December 2023
20:00

United Arab Emirates	0–0	Saudi Arabia

Al-Saada Stadium, Salalah

== Knockout stage ==
=== Semi-finals ===
18 December 2023
17:00

Yemen	2–0	United Arab Emirates
Qasem 54', 87'

Al-Saada Stadium, Salalah
18 December 2023
20:30

Saudi Arabia	2–1	Iraq
Ahmed 28'; Saeed 39'		Jassim 60'

Al-Saada Stadium, Salalah

=== Final ===
20 December 2023
19:30

Yemen	1–1	Saudi Arabia
Al-Khader 11'		Al-Dawood 77'
Penalties
Al-Khader (penalty missed); Qasem (penalty scored); Al-Nasheri (penalty missed); Rahman (penalty scored); Al-Ahmed (penalty scored)	3–2	(penalty scored) Al-Awfi; (penalty missed) Asiri; (penalty missed) Barnawi; (penalty scored) Hazazi; (penalty missed) Al-Fawaz

Al-Saada Stadium, Salalah

== Goalscorers ==
There were 28 goals scored in 15 matches, for an average of 1.87 goals per match.

4 goals

- (Iraq) Zain Al-Abidin Jassim

2 goals

- (Jordan) Mahmoud Al-Tmaizi
- (Saudi Arabia) Al-Waleed Al-Awfi
- (Yemen) Abdulrahman Al-Khader
- (Yemen) Adel Abbas Qasem

1 goal

- (Iraq) Ahmed Abdulridha
- (Iraq) Alaa Waheed
- (Jordan) Azzedine Al-Masry
- (Oman) Al-Walid Al-Braidaei
- (Saudi Arabia) Thari Ahmed
- (Saudi Arabia) Meshal Al-Dawood
- (Saudi Arabia) Abdullah Hazazi
- (Saudi Arabia) Abubakr Saeed
- (Saudi Arabia) Abdulrahman Sufyani
- (Syria) Abdelrahman Dinawi
- (United Arab Emirates) Hazza Bin Mahdi
- (Yemen) Abdulrahman Abdulnabi
- (Yemen) Omar Atwi
- (Yemen) Mohammed Shamseddin
- (Yemen) Mardan Al-Ward

1 own goal

- (Iraq) Ali Al-Amiri (against Oman)
