= 2026 WAFF U-17 Championship =

بطولة اتحاد غرب آسيا الحادية عشرة للناشئين 2026

Tournament details
- Host country: Jordan
- City: Aqaba
- Dates: 26 September – 5 October
- Teams: 7 (from 1 sub-confederation)
- Venue: 1 (in 1 host city)

Final positions
- Champions: Lebanon (1st title)
- Runners-up: Yemen

Tournament statistics
- Matches played: 12
- Goals scored: 23 (1.92 per match)
- Top scorer(s): (Jordan) Faisal Al-Hourani (Lebanon) Ibrahim Farchoukh (Yemen) Mohammed Aziz (Yemen) Sailan Sailan (2 goals)
- Best player: (Yemen) Ali Farea
- Best goalkeeper: (Lebanon) Mehdi Makki

The 2026 WAFF U-17 Championship was the 13th edition of the WAFF U-17 Championship organised by the WAFF. It will be held in Aqaba, Jordan from 26 September to 5 October. Seven of the twelve members participated in the competition.

Saudi Arabia were the defending champions of the competition, but did not participate in this edition. Lebanon won its first title of the competition, defeating Yemen 4–3 on penalties.

== Draw ==
The draw ceremony took place on 9 September 2026, to which the seven teams were divided into two groups. Teams in the same group in the AFC U-17 qualifiers were guaranteed not to be in the same group in this tournament.

== Teams ==
Players born on or after 1 January 2010 were eligible to participate in the competition.

== Group stage ==
=== Group A ===
Pos	Team	Pld	W	D	L	GF	GA	GD	Pts	Qualification
1	Yemen	3	3	0	0	7	2	+5	9	Knockout stage
2	Lebanon	3	2	0	1	6	2	+4	6	Knockout stage
3	Palestine	3	0	1	2	1	4	−3	1	
4	Syria	3	0	1	2	2	8	−6	1	

Source: WAFF
Rules for classification: Group stage tiebreakers
26 September 2026
17:00

Yemen	2–0	Palestine
Farea 6'; AlKum 80' (o.g.)	Report

Al-Aqaba Stadium, Aqaba
26 September 2026
20:00

Lebanon	4–0	Syria
El Zohbi 24'; Farchoukh 64'; Kurdi 82'; Kammouni 90+1'	Report

Al-Aqaba Stadium, Aqaba

28 September 2026
17:00

Palestine	0–1	Lebanon
	Report	Farchoukh 14' (pen.)

Al-Aqaba Stadium, Aqaba
28 September 2026
20:00

Syria	1–3	Yemen
Maghmouma 71'	Report	Sailan 6'; Aziz 32'; Shafie 56'

Al-Aqaba Stadium, Aqaba

30 September 2026
17:00

Yemen	2–1	Lebanon
Mahmoud 61' (pen.); Aziz 90+2'	Report	El Barouk 40'

Al-Aqaba Stadium, Aqaba
30 September 2026
20:00

Syria	1–1	Palestine
Al-Salhani 59'	Report	Khalifah 53'

Al-Aqaba Stadium, Aqaba

=== Group B ===
Pos	Team	Pld	W	D	L	GF	GA	GD	Pts	Qualification
1	Jordan (H)	2	1	1	0	3	1	+2	4	Knockout stage
2	United Arab Emirates	2	1	1	0	1	0	+1	4	Knockout stage
3	Oman	2	0	0	2	1	4	−3	0	

Source: WAFF
Rules for classification: Group stage tiebreakers
(H) Hosts
27 September 2026
17:00

Jordan	3–1	Oman
Al-Hourani 31', 73'; Al-Issa 81'	Report	Al Shamsi 5'

Al-Aqaba Stadium, Aqaba

29 September 2026
18:00

United Arab Emirates	1–0	Oman
Kuznetsov 90+3'	Report

Al-Aqaba Stadium, Aqaba

1 October 2026
18:00

Jordan	0–0	United Arab Emirates
	Report

Al-Aqaba Stadium, Aqaba

== Knockout stage ==
=== Semi-finals ===
3 October 2026
17:00

Yemen	2–1	United Arab Emirates
Sailan 10'; Al-Wasabi 41'	Report	Bani 37' (pen.)

Al-Aqaba Stadium, Aqaba

3 October 2026
20:00

Jordan	0–0	Lebanon
	Report
Penalties
Al-Fawadleh (penalty missed); Al-Riyahneh (penalty missed); Qadadeh (penalty scored); Abu Sheikha (penalty missed)	1–3	Madi (penalty scored); Kammouni (penalty scored); El Barouk (penalty scored); Messelmani (penalty missed)

Al-Aqaba Stadium, Aqaba

=== Final ===
5 October 2026
19:00

Yemen	0–0	Lebanon
	Report
Penalties
Sailan (penalty missed); Al-Wasabi (penalty scored); Aziz (penalty scored); Mahmoud (penalty scored); Al-Sanhani (penalty missed)	3–4	Madi (penalty missed); Hamieh (penalty scored); El Barouk (penalty scored); Kurdi (penalty scored); El Zohbi (penalty scored)

Al-Aqaba Stadium, Aqaba
Referee: Ammar Bdor (Syria)

== Goalscorers ==
There were 23 goals scored in 12 matches, for an average of 1.92 goals per match.

2 goals

- (Jordan) Faisal Al-Hourani
- (Lebanon) Ibrahim Farchoukh
- (Yemen) Mohammed Aziz
- (Yemen) Sailan Sailan

1 goal

- (Yemen) Ali Farea
- (Yemen) Mohammed Shafie
- (Yemen) Saber Mahmoud
- (Yemen) Ali Shafeq Al-Wasabi
- (Lebanon) Jad El Zohbi
- (Lebanon) Hussein Kurdi
- (Lebanon) Mehdi Kammouni
- (Lebanon) Jad El Barouk
- (Jordan) Jameel Al-Issa
- (Oman) Bashar Al Shamsi
- (Syria) Abdelhadi Maghmouna
- (Syria) Qusai Al-Salhani
- (United Arab Emirates) Lev Kuznetsov
- (United Arab Emirates) Salem Gamal Bani
- (Palestine) Yazan Khalifah

1 own goal

- (Palestine) Zaki AlKum (against Yemen)
