= 2022 WAFF U-16 Championship =

بطولة اتحاد غرب آسيا التاسعة للناشئين

Tournament details
- Host country: Jordan
- City: Aqaba
- Dates: 21–30 June
- Teams: 8 (from 1 confederation)
- Venue: 1 (in 1 host city)

Final positions
- Champions: Jordan (1st title)
- Runners-up: Lebanon

Tournament statistics
- Matches played: 15
- Goals scored: 31 (2.07 per match)
- Top scorer: (Yemen) Abdul-Rahman Abdul-Nabi (4 goals)
- Best player: (Jordan) Izz Alden Abu Aqoleh
- Best goalkeeper: (Lebanon) Jad Jawhar

The 2022 WAFF U-16 Championship was the ninth edition of the WAFF U-16 Championship, the annual international youth football championship organised by the WAFF for the men's under-16 national teams of West Asia. It took place in Aqaba, Jordan, at the Aqaba Stadium. Eight teams played in the competition, with players born on or after 1 January 2006 eligible to participate.

Yemen, who won the previous edition in 2021, were the title holders; they were eliminated in the group stage. Hosts Jordan won the competition for the first time, after defeating Lebanon 1–0 in the final.

== Participating nations ==
Eight nations from the WAFF participated in the tournament; Bahrain, Qatar, Saudi Arabia and the United Arab Emirates did not take part. The draw for the group stage was held on 25 May 2022 at the WAFF headquarters in Jordan.

Team	Appearance	Last appearance	Previous best performance
Iraq	9th	2021	Champions (2013, 2015)
Jordan	9th	2021	Runners-up (2019)
Kuwait	3rd	2019	Seventh place (2019)
Lebanon	5th	2021	Fourth place (2005)
Oman	2nd	2019	Fifth place (2019)
Palestine	7th	2021	Ninth place (2019)
Syria	6th	2021	Champions (2007)
Yemen	5th	2021	Champions (2021)

== Group stage ==
The group winners and runners-up advanced to the semi-finals.

=== Group A ===
Pos	Team	Pld	W	D	L	GF	GA	GD	Pts	Qualification
1	Iraq	3	3	0	0	6	1	+5	9	Knockout stage
2	Jordan (H)	3	2	0	1	2	2	0	6	Knockout stage
3	Yemen	3	1	0	2	5	3	+2	3	
4	Oman	3	0	0	3	0	7	−7	0	

Source: WAFF
(H) Hosts
21 June 2022
18:00

Iraq	2–1	Yemen
Abdul-Ridha 48'; Jaafar 64'	Report	Abdul-Nabi 68'

Aqaba Stadium, Aqaba
21 June 2022
21:00

Oman	0–1	Jordan
	Report	Al-Khador 20'

Aqaba Stadium, Aqaba
Referee: Mohammad Abu Shahla (Palestine)

23 June 2022
18:00

Oman	0–2	Iraq
	Report	Jassem 23'; Karim 44'

Aqaba Stadium, Aqaba
Referee: Faisal Al Balwi (Saudi Arabia)
23 June 2022
21:00

Yemen	0–1	Jordan
	Report	Abu Aqouleh 10'

Aqaba Stadium, Aqaba
Referee: Abdullah Al Kandari (Kuwait)

25 June 2022
18:00

Yemen	4–0	Oman
Abdullah 13'; Abdul Nabi 38', 45+1', 84'	Report

Aqaba Stadium, Aqaba
25 June 2022
21:00

Jordan	0–2	Iraq
	Report	Jawad 68'; Jaafar 73'

Aqaba Stadium, Aqaba

=== Group B ===
Pos	Team	Pld	W	D	L	GF	GA	GD	Pts	Qualification
1	Syria	3	3	0	0	8	1	+7	9	Knockout stage
2	Lebanon	3	2	0	1	4	1	+3	6	Knockout stage
3	Kuwait	3	1	0	2	1	7	−6	3	
4	Palestine	3	0	0	3	1	5	−4	0	

Source: WAFF
22 June 2022
18:00

Palestine	1–2	Syria
Sharif 62'		Issa 58'; Alaa 90'

Aqaba Stadium, Aqaba
Referee: Usama Ahmed (Jordan)
22 June 2022
21:00

Lebanon	2–0	Kuwait
El Qawwam 36'; Siblini 86'	Report

Aqaba Stadium, Aqaba
Referee: Ahmed Kadhem (Iraq)

24 June 2022
18:00

Kuwait	1–0	Palestine
Al Saraf 85'	Report

Aqaba Stadium, Aqaba
24 June 2022
21:00

Syria	1–0	Lebanon
Batal 20'	Report

Aqaba Stadium, Aqaba

26 June 2022
18:00

Syria	5–0	Kuwait
Sakkan 19'; Issa 22'; Saleh 39'; Hamami 45+4'; Al-Boni 80'	Report

Aqaba Stadium, Aqaba
26 June 2022
21:00

Lebanon	2–0	Palestine
Yassine 44', 80'	Report

Aqaba Stadium, Aqaba
Referee: Ahmed Kadhem (Iraq)

== Knockout stage ==
=== Semi-finals ===
28 June 2022
18:00

Iraq	0–1	Lebanon
	Report	Yassine 43'

Aqaba Stadium, Aqaba
Referee: Haitham Al-Walidi (Yemen)
28 June 2022
21:30

Syria	1–2	Jordan
Al Hindi 20'	WAFF report Jordan FA report	Abu Aqouleh 48', 78'

Aqaba Stadium, Aqaba
Referee: Abdullah Al Kandari (Kuwait)

=== Final ===
30 June 2022
18:00

Lebanon	0–1	Jordan
	Report	Freij 53'

Aqaba Stadium, Aqaba
Referee: Mohammad Bonfour (Bahrain)

== Player awards ==
The following awards were given at the conclusion of the tournament:

Top Goalscorer	Best Player	Best Goalkeeper
(Yemen) Abdul-Rahman Abdul-Nabi	(Jordan) Izz Alden Abu Aqoleh	(Lebanon) Jad Jawhar

== Goalscorers ==
There were 31 goals scored in 15 matches, for an average of 2.07 goals per match.

4 goals

- (Yemen) Abdul-Rahman Abdul-Nabi

3 goals

- (Jordan) Izz Alden Abu Aqoleh
- (Lebanon) Mohammad Yassine

2 goals

- (Iraq) Karrar Jaffar
- (Syria) Kawah Issa

1 goal

- (Iraq) Ahmed Abdul-Ridha Al-Hawi
- (Iraq) Amir Jawad
- (Iraq) Hassan Jassem
- (Iraq) Hassan Karim
- (Jordan) Abdul-Rahman Al-Khador
- (Jordan) Saleh Freij
- (Kuwait) Fadel Al Saraf
- (Lebanon) Badreddine El Qawwam
- (Lebanon) Hussein Siblini
- (Palestine) Mohammad Sharif
- (Syria) Aladdin Alaa
- (Syria) Abdallah Batal
- (Syria) Mohammad Al-Boni
- (Syria) Hashem Hamami
- (Syria) Alaa Eddin Al Hindi
- (Syria) Ahmad Sakkan
- (Syria) Omar Saleh
- (Yemen) Abdul-Rahman Abdullah
