= Zain Al-Abidin Jassim =

Iraqi footballer (born 2008)

Personal information
- Full name: Zain Al-Abidin Jassim Al-Rubaye
- Date of birth: 5 August 2008 (age 18)
- Place of birth: Basra, Iraq
- Height: 1.75 m (5 ft 9 in)
- Positions: Attacking midfielder; forward

Team information
- Current team: Al-Minaa
- Number: 18

Youth career
- –2025: Al-Minaa

Senior career*
Years	Team	Apps	(Gls)
2024	Naft Al-Basra	0	(0)
2025–	Al-Minaa	11	(1)

International career^{‡}
2022–2023	Iraq U15	4	(4)
2023–2024	Iraq U16	2	(3)
2024–2025	Iraq U17	6	(5)
2025–	Iraq U20	3	(1)
- * Club domestic league appearances and goals as of May 20, 2026 ‡ National team caps and goals as of 31 August 2026

Zain Al-Abidin Jassim Al-Rubaye (Arabic: زين العابدين جاسم الربيعي; born 5 August 2008) is an Iraqi professional footballer who plays as a attacking midfielder for Iraq Stars League side Al-Minaa.

== Club career ==
Jassim began playing football at Al-Minaa Academy. After shining in the 2023 WAFF U-15 Championship, where he won the top scorer award, rival club Naft Al-Basra signed him on a three-year contract, although he was still an Al-Minaa' player and his contract had not yet expired. This caused a crisis between the two clubs, affecting the player as he was unable to play for either club. He remained suspended.

After the crisis ended, and On 19 May 2025, he made his debut for the first team of Al-Minaa in the Iraq Stars League, coming on as a substitute for Karrar Jaafar in a match against Karbala and providing an assist for Alaa Abdul Zahra. After that, he played to Al-Minaa Academy and won the 2024–25 Iraqi U19 Premier League title with them, scoring the winning goal in the final against Zakho.

On May 20, 2026, he scored his first goal in the Iraq Stars League against Al-Mosul in a match that ended with Al-Minaa winning 1–0. After that, he played to Al-Minaa Academy and won the 2025–26 Iraqi U19 Premier League title with them, scoring the winning goal in the final against Al-Gharraf.

== International career ==
Jassim was first picked to represent Iraq in 2023, when the under-15 coach Ahmed Kadhim selected him to be a part of his 23-man squad to play in 2023 WAFF U-15 Championship. He did not score in his first match against Yemen, but he scored a brace in the second match against Lebanon, and one goal in the third match against Oman. The team qualified for the semi-finals, and played against Saudi Arabia, and Jassim scoring a goal in a match that the team lost 2–1, but he won the title of top scorer of the tournament, scoring four goals.

He also played in the 2024 WAFF U-16 Championship, scoring a brace in the first match against Lebanon and one in the second match against Jordan. However, the team was deemed to have lost both matches due to the ineligibility of a player. He also played in the 2025 AFC U-17 Asian Cup qualification, scoring a brace in the first match against Chinese Taipei. He was also selected to be part of the 24-man Iraq U20 squad to play in the AGCFF U-20 Gulf Cup. He did not participate in the first match against Bahrain, but he played in the starting lineup in the second match against Egypt on 1 September 2025, and scored a goal after just three minutes to help the team win and qualify for the semi-finals. He was again named in the under-17 team for the AGCFF U-17 Gulf Cup, and on 23 September 2025, he scored a brace against Bahrain in a 2–0 win. Then on 26 September, he scored a goal against Saudi Arabia to lead his team to the semi-finals. He also participated with the under-20 team in the 2027 AFC U-20 Asian Cup qualification.

== Honours ==
Individual

- WAFF U-15 Championship Top Goalscorer: 2023 (4 goals)
