= 2024 WAFF U-16 Championship =

بطولة اتحاد غرب آسيا الحادية عشرة للناشئين 2024

Tournament details
- Host country: Jordan
- City: Zarqa
- Dates: 2–11 September
- Teams: 9 (from 1 confederation) (from 1 sub-confederation)
- Venue: 1 (in 1 host city)

Final positions
- Champions: Syria (2nd title)
- Runners-up: Saudi Arabia

Tournament statistics
- Matches played: 12
- Goals scored: 33 (2.75 per match)

The 2024 WAFF U-16 Championship was the 11th edition of the WAFF U-16 Championship organised by the WAFF. It was held in Zarqa, Jordan from 2 to 11 September. Nine member teams participated in the competition. The title holder was Yemen.

Players born on or after 1 January 2008 are eligible to participate.

== Draw ==
The draw ceremony took place on 7 August 2024, and the nine teams were divided into three groups. Kuwait, Qatar and the UAE were absent from the tournament. Teams in the same group in the AFC U-17 qualifiers have been guaranteed not to be in the same group in this tournament.

== Match officials ==
- (Bahrain) Hussein Al-Shuwaikh
- (Bahrain) Abdullah Yaqoub (assistant)
- (Jordan) Ahmad Yacoub Ibrahim
- (Palestine) Muath Owfi
- (Palestine) Kenan Al-Bajawi (assistant)
- (Yemen) Mohammed Basaleh
- (Yemen) Ibrahim Al-Hasani (assistant)

== Group stage ==
=== Group A ===
Pos	Team	Pld	W	D	L	GF	GA	GD	Pts	Qualification
1	Jordan (H)	2	2	0	0	4	0	+4	6	Knockout stage
2	Lebanon	2	1	0	1	3	1	+2	3	
3	Iraq	2	0	0	2	0	6	−6	0	

Source: WAFF
Rules for classification: Group stage tiebreakers
(H) Hosts
2 September 2024
20:00

Lebanon	0–1	Jordan
	Report	Mahmoud 77'

Prince Mohammed Stadium, Zarqa

4 September 2024
17:00

Iraq	0–3 Awarded (Note: Iraq forfeited the match due to fielding the ineligible player Ahmed Ali Abdullah among other penalties.)	Lebanon
Jassim 4', 34'	Report	Sa'ad 58'; Fawaz 73'

Prince Mohammed Stadium, Zarqa

6 September 2024
20:00

Jordan	3–0 Awarded	Iraq
Al-Tmaizi 5'	Report	Jassim 45+1'; Ridha 56'

Prince Mohammed Stadium, Zarqa

=== Group B ===
Pos	Team	Pld	W	D	L	GF	GA	GD	Pts	Qualification
1	Saudi Arabia	2	1	0	1	5	4	+1	3	Knockout stage
2	Yemen	2	1	0	1	4	4	0	3	
3	Oman	2	1	0	1	4	5	−1	3	

Source: WAFF
Rules for classification: Group stage tiebreakers
2 September 2024
17:00

Oman	1–3	Yemen
Al-Amrani 52'	Report	Hamdi 10', 80'; Delio 38'

Prince Mohammed Stadium, Zarqa

4 September 2024
20:00

Saudi Arabia	2–3	Oman
Al-Fawaz 34'; Al-Sufyani 49'	Report	Al-Amrani 8'; Al-Rashdi 90+3'; Al-Kharousi 90+6'

Prince Mohammed Stadium, Zarqa

6 September 2024
16:00

Yemen	1–3	Saudi Arabia
Hamdi 83'	Report	Ahmed 13'; Matari 38'; Al-Sufyani 75'

Prince Mohammed Stadium, Zarqa

=== Group C ===
Pos	Team	Pld	W	D	L	GF	GA	GD	Pts	Qualification
1	Palestine	2	1	1	0	4	1	+3	4	Knockout stage
2	Syria	2	1	1	0	3	2	+1	4	Knockout stage
3	Bahrain	2	0	0	2	1	5	−4	0	

Source: WAFF
Rules for classification: Group stage tiebreakers
3 September 2024
20:00

Palestine	3–0 Awarded (Note: Bahrain forfeited the match due to fielding the ineligible player Mihran Mohammed Yousef among other penalties.)	Bahrain
	Report

Prince Mohammed Stadium, Zarqa

5 September 2024
17:00

Syria	1–1	Palestine
Al-Sarraj 24'	Report	Al-Izza 78'

Prince Mohammed Stadium, Zarqa

7 September 2024
20:00

Bahrain	1–2	Syria
Zuhair 13'	Report	Al-Hassan 70'; Dinawi 90+2'

Prince Mohammed Stadium, Zarqa

=== Ranking of best runners-up ===
Pos	Grp	Team	Pld	W	D	L	GF	GA	GD	Pts	Qualification
1	C	Syria	2	1	1	0	3	2	+1	4	Knockout stage
2	A	Lebanon	2	1	0	1	3	1	+2	3	
3	B	Yemen	2	1	0	1	4	4	0	3	

Source: WAFF

== Knockout stage ==
=== Semi-finals ===
9 September 2024
17:00

Saudi Arabia	2–1	Palestine

Prince Mohammed Stadium, Zarqa
9 September 2024
20:30

Jordan	1–1	Syria
Penalties
	4–5

Prince Mohammed Stadium, Zarqa

=== Final ===
11 September 2024
19:00

Saudi Arabia	2–2	Syria
Penalties
	9–10

Prince Mohammed Stadium, Zarqa

== Goalscorers ==
There were 23 goals scored in 8 matches, for an average of 2.88 goals per match (as of 6 September 2024).

3 goals

- (Iraq) Zain Al-Abidin Jassim
- (Yemen) Karim Hamdi

2 goals

- (Oman) Ahmed Al-Amrani
- (Saudi Arabia) Abdul-Rahman Al-Sufyani

1 goal

- (Iraq) Ali Ridha
- (Jordan) Mohanad Mahmoud
- (Jordan) Mahmoud Al-Tmaizi
- (Lebanon) Mohammed Fawaz
- (Lebanon) Mohammed Sa'ad
- (Oman) Sulaiman Al-Kharousi
- (Oman) Al-Waleed Al-Rashdi
- (Palestine) Ayham Al-Izza
- (Saudi Arabia) Thari Ahmed
- (Saudi Arabia) Abdul-Aziz Al-Fawaz
- (Saudi Arabia) Abdul-Hadi matari
- (Syria) Abdul-Rahman Al-Sarraj
- (Yemen) Ali Delio
