= Bader Kawam =

Lebanese footballer (born 2006)

Personal information
- Full name: Badreddine Mahmoud Kawam
- Date of birth: 2 April 2006 (age 20)
- Place of birth: Sidon, Lebanon
- Height: 1.75 m (5 ft 9 in)
- Position: Right-back

Team information
- Current team: Jwaya
- Number: 2

Youth career
- –2022: Superior Squad
- 2022–2026: Ahed

Senior career*
Years	Team	Apps	(Gls)
2023–2026	Ahed	33	(2)
2026–	Jwaya	0	(0)

International career^{‡}
2022	Lebanon U16		(1)
2022	Lebanon U17	3	(0)
2023	Lebanon U20		
2026–	Lebanon	3	(0)
Medal record
Men's football
Representing Lebanon
WAFF U-16 Championship
Silver medal – second place	2022	U-16 Team
- * Club domestic league appearances and goals as of 13 September 2026 ‡ National team caps and goals as of 13 November 2026

Badreddine Mahmoud Kawam (Arabic: بدر الدين محمود قوام; born 2 April 2006), known as Bader Kawam (Arabic: بدر قوام), is a Lebanese footballer who plays as a right-back for Lebanese Premier League club Jwaya and the Lebanon national team.

== Club career ==
A youth product of Superior Squad, Kawam moved to Ahed's youth sector in 2022. In September 2025, Kawam scored his first senior goal in Ahed's 3–0 win over Racing Beirut. In July 2026, he scored in a 2–1 defeat to Nejmeh. Kawam finished the 2025–26 season with two goals in 12 league appearances.

In August 2026, Kawam transferred to Jwaya.

== International career ==
Kawam was called up to the Lebanon national under-16 team for the 2022 WAFF U-16 Championship, in which Lebanon finished runners-up, and to the under-17s for the 2023 AFC U-17 Asian Cup qualification. In 2023, he was called up to the under-20s ahead of two friendly matches against Jordan.

He received his first call-up to the senior national team from head coach Madjid Bougherra in September 2026, ahead of friendlies against the Maldives and Kyrgyzstan in October. He made his debut on 1 October, starting in a 6–0 win against the Maldives.

== Style of play ==
Kawam plays as a right-back.

== Career statistics ==
=== Club ===
As of match played 19 September 2026

Appearances and goals by club, season and competition
Club	Season	League			Lebanon Cup		League cup (Note: Includes Lebanese Federation Cup)		Other		Total	
Club	Season	Division	Apps	Goals	Apps	Goals	Apps	Goals	Apps	Goals	Apps	Goals
Ahed	2023–24	Lebanese Premier League	2	0	3	0	1	0	—		6	0
Ahed	2024–25	Lebanese Premier League	19	0	—		—		—		19	0
Ahed	2025–26	Lebanese Premier League	12	2	0	0	—		2 (Note: Appearances in National Solidarity Tournament)	0	14	2
Ahed	Total		33	2	3	0	1	0	2	0	39	2
Jwaya	2026–27	Lebanese Premier League	0	0	2	0	—		—		2	0
Career total			33	2	5	0	1	0	2	0	41	2

=== International ===
As of match played 13 November 2026

Appearances and goals by national team and year
National team	Year	Apps	Goals
Lebanon	2026	3	0
Total		3	0

== Honours ==
Ahed

- Lebanese Federation Cup: 2023

Lebanon U16

- WAFF U-16 Championship runner-up: 2022
