= Taha Benrhozil =

Moroccan footballer (born 2006)

Personal information
- Full name: Taha Benrhozil
- Date of birth: 18 June 2006 (age 20)
- Place of birth: Mohammedia, Morocco
- Height: 1.79 m (5 ft 10 in)
- Position: Goalkeeper

Team information
- Current team: Mohammed VI Football Academy

Youth career
- 2012–2015: La Lauria
- 2015–: Mohammed VI Football Academy

International career^{‡}
Years	Team	Apps	(Gls)
2022–	Morocco U17	17	(0)
Medal record
Representing Morocco
U-17 Africa Cup of Nations
Runner-up	2023
- ‡ National team caps and goals as of 22 November 2023

Taha Benrhozil (Arabic: طه بنغوزيل; born 18 June 2006) is a Moroccan footballer who currently plays as a goalkeeper for the Mohammed VI Football Academy.

== Early life ==
Benrhozil was born in Mohammedia to a father who also played as a goalkeeper, and is the grandson of Abdelsalam Benrhozil, who played for Union de Mohammédia.

== International career ==
Called up to the Morocco under-17 side for the 2022 Arab Cup U-17, Benrhozil started in every game as Morocco reached the final. For his performances in the tournament, Benrhozil was named Goalkeeper of the Tournament.

In the final, after Morocco lost 4–2 on penalties to Algeria following a 1–1 draw in normal time, Benrhozil was involved in a collision with an Algerian player as he went to leave his penalty area, with the Algerian team choosing to celebrate in the Moroccan end of the pitch. This altercation sparked a brawl, with Algerian players attacking Benrhozil and his teammates with kicks and punches. For their role in the incident, Algeria were subject to punishment from the Union of Arab Football Associations (UAFA), who ordered them to pay a fine of US$120,000 for fans entering the field, while both sides were fined US$25,000 for failing to control players. Algerian player Abdelhak Ben Idder, who initially attacked Behrhozil, was given a six-month suspension by the UAFA.

He was called up to the squad again in April for the 2023 U-17 Africa Cup of Nations, and he drew praise for his performance in Morocco's 3–0 quarter-final win against Algeria, keeping prolific Algerian forward Moslem Anatouf quiet during the game. Following Morocco's 6–5 penalty shoot-out win against Mali, he earned comparisons to Morocco national team goalkeeper Yassine Bounou, for their shared ability to save penalty kicks.

His performances continued to impress for Morocco's under-17 side, and at the 2023 FIFA U-17 World Cup, he was named Man of the Match in Morocco's 4–1 penalty shoot-out win against Iran, following a 1–1 draw in normal time - saving from Iranian Kasra Taheri twice in the penalty shoot-out, after the initial penalty was retaken due to encroachment from Benrhozil.

== Personal life ==
Benrhozil supports Moroccan Botola side Wydad Casablanca.

== Honours ==
Morocco U17

- U-17 Africa Cup of Nations runner-up: 2023
