= 2023–24 ES Ben Aknoun season =

ES Ben Aknoun
2023–24 season
- President: Kamel Meberbeche
- Head coach: Abdennour Bousbia (until 11 October 2023); Billel Dziri (from 11 October 2023)
- Stadium: 20 August 1955 Stadium
- Ligue 1: 15th (relegated)
- Algerian Cup: Quarter-final
- Top goalscorer: League: Abdelali Hadji; Abderahmane Hachoud (7 goals); All: Abdelali Hadji (9 goals)
- Biggest win: ES Ben Aknoun 3–0 ASM Oran
- Biggest defeat: MC Alger 4–0 ES Ben Aknoun
Home colours	Away colours

The 2023–24 season, is ES Ben Aknoun's first ever season in the top flight of Algerian football. In addition to the domestic league, ES Ben Aknoun are participating in the Algerian Cup.

== Squad list ==
Players and squad numbers last updated on 5 February 2024.
Note: Flags indicate national team as has been defined under FIFA eligibility rules. Players may hold more than one non-FIFA nationality.

No.	Nat.	Position	Name	Date of Birth (Age)	Signed from
Goalkeepers
1	(Algeria)	GK	Mohamed Lamine Zemmamouche	19 March 1985 (aged 38)	(Algeria) USM Alger
18	(Algeria)	GK	Yanis Bentchakal	21 July 1998 (aged 25)	(Algeria) USMM Hadjout
24	(Algeria)	GK	Tarek Bousseder	28 November 2000 (aged 22)	(Algeria) Paradou AC
Defenders
2	(Algeria)	RB	Zidane Guennoune	29 September 2000 (aged 22)	
3	(Algeria)	CB	Boualem Mesmoudi	15 April 1994 (aged 29)	Free agent
4	(Algeria)	CB	Ilyes Haddouche	1 July 1998 (aged 25)	(Algeria) NA Hussein Dey
6	(Algeria)	LB	Zakaria Bencherifa	8 September 1991 (aged 32)	(Algeria) JSM Skikda
13	(Algeria)	CB	Mehdi Messaoudène	1 February 1993 (aged 29)	(Algeria) ASM Oran
15	(Algeria)	CB	Fateh Talah	30 March 1993 (aged 30)	(Algeria) JS Kabylie
16	(Algeria)	CB	Abdelkrim Oukali	13 December 1994 (aged 28)	(Algeria) NC Magra
22	(Algeria)	CB	Hamza Ayad	13 February 1996 (aged 27)	(Libya) Al Ansar
25	(Algeria)	CB	Ramy Oukali	20 January 2001 (aged 22)	
26	(Algeria)	LB	Tarek Belouchat	16 April 1997 (aged 26)	(Algeria) ES Sétif
27	(Algeria)	RB	Abderahmane Hachoud	2 July 1988 (aged 35)	(Algeria) MC Alger
Midfielders
5	(Algeria)	MF	Mohamed Daoud	27 December 1991 (aged 31)	(Algeria) NC Magra
7	(Algeria)	MF	Kheireddine Toual	4 August 2001 (aged 22)	(Algeria) USM Alger
8	(Algeria)	MF	Zineddine Asli	15 April 1997 (aged 26)	(Algeria) JSM Skikda
10	(Algeria)	MF	Chakib Aoudjane	12 June 1996 (aged 27)	
14	(Algeria)	MF	Abdelkader Boutiche	26 October 1996 (aged 26)	Free agent
17	(Algeria)	MF	Rayan Allam	1 December 2000 (aged 22)	
20	(Algeria)	MF	Yacine Deghmani	29 July 1991 (aged 32)	(Algeria) RC Arbaâ
23	(Algeria)	MF	Aziz Benabdi	9 August 1993 (aged 30)	Free agent
Forwards
9	(Algeria)	FW	Hadj Bouguèche	7 December 1983 (aged 39)	(Algeria) NC Magra
11	(Algeria)	FW	Ahmed Zaouche	27 May 1999 (aged 24)	(Algeria) RC Arbaâ
12	(Algeria)	FW	Ali Haroun	1 February 1997 (aged 26)	(Algeria) MC Alger
21	(Algeria)	FW	Abdelali Hadji	25 June 1997 (aged 26)	(Algeria) USM El Harrach

== Transfers ==
=== In ===
==== Winter ====
Date	Pos	Player	Moving from	Fee	Source
4 February 2024	DF	(Algeria) Boualem Mesmoudi	Free agent	Free transfer	
4 February 2024	MF	(Algeria) Aziz Benabdi	Free agent	Free transfer	
4 February 2024	FW	(Algeria) Ali Haroun	MC Alger	Free transfer	
4 February 2024	MF	(Algeria) Kheireddine Toual	USM Alger	Loan	

=== Out ===
==== Summer ====
Date	Pos	Player	Moving to	Fee	Source
14 August 2023	MF	(Algeria) Dalil Hassen Khodja	MC Alger	Free transfer	

==== Winter ====
Date	Pos	Player	Moving to	Fee	Source
31 January 2024	DF	(Algeria) Adel Meguetounhif	Free agent	Free transfer (Released)	
31 January 2024	MF	(Algeria) Reda Halilou	Free agent	Free transfer (Released)	
31 January 2024	FW	(Algeria) Rayane Attia	Free agent	Free transfer (Released)	
31 January 2024	FW	(Algeria) Yasser Bouabdallah	Free agent	Free transfer (Released)	
5 February 2024	FW	(Algeria) Mouaauya Meklouche	Free agent	Free transfer (Released)	

== Competitions ==
=== Overview ===
Competition	Record								Started round	Final position / round	First match	Last match
Competition	G	W	D	L	GF	GA	GD	Win %	Started round	Final position / round	First match	Last match
Ligue 1	30	8	8	14	32	37	−5	26.67	—N/a	15th	16 September 2023	14 June 2024
Algerian Cup	4	3	1	0	7	1	+6	75.00	Round of 64	Quarter-final	2 February 2024	13 April 2024
Total	34	11	9	14	39	38	+1	32.35				

Updated to match played 14 June 2024
Source: Competitions

=== Ligue 1 ===
==== League table ====
Pos	Team	Pld	W	D	L	GF	GA	GD	Pts	Qualification or relegation
12	NC Magra	30	9	11	10	30	32	−2	38	
13	MC Oran	30	9	9	12	26	33	−7	36	
14	US Biskra	30	9	9	12	25	34	−9	36	
15	ES Ben Aknoun (R)	30	8	8	14	32	37	−5	32 (Note: ES Ben Aknoun awarded 3–0 win against US Souf.)	Relegation to Algerian Ligue 2
16	US Souf (R)	30	2	1	27	22	86	−64	7 (Note: US Souf lost 3–0 win against ES Ben Aknoun by penalty.)	Relegation to Algerian Ligue 2

Source: the-sports.org
Rules for classification: 1) points; 2) head-to-head points; 3) head-to-head goal difference; 4) goal difference; 5) total goals; 6) fairplay ranking; 7) playoff.
(R) Relegated

==== Results summary ====
Overall								Home						Away					
Pld	W	D	L	GF	GA	GD	Pts	W	D	L	GF	GA	GD	W	D	L	GF	GA	GD
29	8	8	13	32	37	−5	32	6	3	6	22	20	+2	2	5	7	10	17	−7

Last updated: 14 June 2024.
Source: Competitive matches

==== Results by round ====
Round	1	2	3	4	5	6	7	8	9	10	11	12	13	14	15	16	17	18	19	20	21	22	23	24	25	26	27	28	29	30
Ground	A	H	A	H	A	H	A	H	A	H	A	H	A	A	H	H	A	H	A	H	A	H	A	H	A	H	A	H	H	A
Result	L	D	L	L	L	L	D	L	L	D	D	W	D	D	D	L	L	W	W	W	D	W	W	L	L	W	L	W	L	L
Position	16	14	15	16	16	16	16	16	16	16	15	14	14	14	14	14	15	15	14	14	14	14	13	14	14	14	15	15	15	15

Updated to match(es) played on 14 June 2024. Source: Competitive matches
A = Away; H = Home; W = Win; D = Draw; L = Loss

==== Matches ====
The league fixtures were announced on 24 August 2023.

All times are local, WAT (UTC+1).

Win Draw Loss Postponed

16 September 2023 Round 1	MC Alger	4–0	ES Ben Aknoun	Dar El Beïda
16:00	Bayazid 11'; Benkhemassa 24'; Belaïli 71'; Merzougui 90'	Report		Stadium: Omar Benrabah Stadium; Referee: Abdelmoumen Touabti

22 September 2023 Round 2	ES Ben Aknoun	2–2	ASO Chlef	Belouizdad
16:00	Hachoud 12' (pen.); Talah 90+2'	Report	Souibaâh 33' (pen.); Belouchat 66' (o.g.)	Stadium: 20 August 1955 Stadium; Referee: Lahlou Benbraham

30 September 2023 Round 3	JS Saoura	1–0	ES Ben Aknoun	Béchar
19:00	Khalfallah 90+4'	Report		Stadium: 20 August 1955 Stadium; Referee: Rafik Aouina

7 October 2023 Round 4	ES Ben Aknoun	0–1	US Souf	Dar El Beïda
15:45		Report	Al-Ghunaymi 36' (pen.)	Stadium: Omar Benrabah Stadium; Referee: Youcef Gamouh

11 November 2023 Round 5	NC Magra	3–1	ES Ben Aknoun	Magra
15:00	Hadded 45+5' (pen.); Demane 62'; Saidi 87'	Report	Zaouche 45+1'	Stadium: Boucheligue Brothers Stadium; Referee: Abdelmoumen Touabti

18 November 2023 Round 6	ES Ben Aknoun	0–1	Paradou AC	Belouizdad
15:00		Report	Titraoui 79'	Stadium: 20 August 1955 Stadium; Referee: Abdelali Ibrir

25 November 2023 Round 7	USM Khenchela	0–0	ES Ben Aknoun	Khenchela
15:00		Report		Stadium: Amar Hamam Stadium; Referee: Bilal Bendjahene

8 December 2023 Round 9	JS Kabylie	1–0	ES Ben Aknoun	Tizi Ouzou
18:00	Boukhanchouche 11'	Report		Stadium: 1 November 1954 Stadium; Referee: Yahia Dahar

15 December 2023 Round 10	ES Ben Aknoun	1–1	CR Belouizdad	Belouizdad
15:15	Hadji 76'	Report	Jallow 39' (pen.)	Stadium: 20 August 1955 Stadium; Referee: Lotfi Bekouassa

29 December 2023 Round 11	US Biskra	1–1	ES Ben Aknoun	Biskra
18:00	Boukarroum 45+4' (pen.)	Report	Zaouche 20'	Stadium: 18 February Stadium; Referee: Abdelali Ibrir

5 January 2024 Round 12	ES Ben Aknoun	2–1	MC Oran	Belouizdad
15:15	Hachoud 11' (pen.); Hadji 60'	Report	Benayad 60'	Stadium: 20 August 1955 Stadium; Referee: Houssam Benyahia

13 January 2024 Round 13	ES Sétif	1–1	ES Ben Aknoun	Sétif
18:00	Oukil 52'	Report	Hachoud 42'	Stadium: 8 May 1945 Stadium; Referee: Bilal Bendjahene

19 January 2024 Round 14	CS Constantine	1–1	ES Ben Aknoun	Constantine
16:45	Madani 90+5'	Report	Ait Mouloud 77'	Stadium: Chahid Hamlaoui Stadium; Referee: Nabil Boukhalfa

23 January 2024 Round 8	ES Ben Aknoun	1–2	USM Alger	Belouizdad
15:30	Deghmani 83'	Report	Bacha 48'; Belkacemi 89'	Stadium: 20 August 1955 Stadium; Referee: Hamza Bouslimani

27 January 2024 Round 15	ES Ben Aknoun	1–1	MC El Bayadh	Belouizdad
15:30	Hadji 1'	Report	Hitala 90+2'	Stadium: 20 August 1955 Stadium; Referee: Ayoub Belhachemi

16 February 2024 Round 17	ASO Chlef	2–1	ES Ben Aknoun	Chlef
16:45	Bourdim 25'; Addadi 73'	Report	Hachoud 40'	Stadium: Mohamed Boumezrag Stadium; Referee: Rafik Aouina

23 February 2024 Round 18	ES Ben Aknoun	2–0	JS Saoura	Belouizdad
16:00	Talah 29'; Aoudjane 85'	Report		Stadium: 20 August 1955 Stadium; Referee: Haithem Ghouti

2 March 2024 Round 19	US Souf	0–3	ES Ben Aknoun	El Oued
16:00		Report		Stadium: 1 November 1954 Stadium; Referee: Abdelali Ibrir
Note: ES Ben Aknoun awarded 3–0 win against US Souf.

15 March 2024 Round 20	ES Ben Aknoun	3–1	NC Magra	Belouizdad
15:30	Haroun 31'; Hadji 69'; Guennoune 84'	Report	Kemoukh 44'	Stadium: 20 August 1955 Stadium; Referee: Mohamed Bouteraa

20 March 2024 Round 16	ES Ben Aknoun	2–3	MC Alger	Dar El Beïda
15:30	Haddouche 59'; Hachoud 76'	Report	Bayazid 39' (pen.); Bencherifa 48' (o.g.); Ghezala 70'	Stadium: Omar Benrabah Stadium; Referee: Lahlou Benbraham

25 March 2024 Round 21	Paradou AC	0–0	ES Ben Aknoun	Dar El Beïda
15:30		Report		Stadium: Omar Benrabah Stadium; Referee: Youcef Gamouh

6 April 2024 Round 22	ES Ben Aknoun	3–2	USM Khenchela	Belouizdad
15:45	Toual 12'; Hadji 46'; Deghmani 87'	Report	Omoyele 35'; Debbih 90+2'	Stadium: 20 August 1955 Stadium; Referee: Alaa Bouab

27 April 2024 Round 24	ES Ben Aknoun	2–3	JS Kabylie	Belouizdad
16:00	Hachoud 21' (pen.); Hadji 81'	Report	Maâmeri 41' (pen.), 88' (pen.); Redjem 78'	Stadium: 20 August 1955 Stadium; Referee: Akram Mechairia

11 May 2024 Round 25	CR Belouizdad	1–0	ES Ben Aknoun	Algiers
17:00	Zerrouki 82'	Report		Stadium: Stade du 5 Juillet; Referee: Billel Soltani

17 May 2024 Round 26	ES Ben Aknoun	2–1	US Biskra	Belouizdad
17:00	Mesmoudi 9'; Toual 31'	Report	Khoualed 51'	Stadium: 20 August 1955 Stadium; Referee: Houssam Benyahia

26 May 2024 Round 27	MC Oran	1–0	ES Ben Aknoun	Oran
16:45	Kerroum 45+3'	Report		Stadium: Ahmed Zabana Stadium; Referee: Youcef Gamouh

30 May 2024 Round 23	USM Alger	0–2	ES Ben Aknoun	Belouizdad
17:00		Report	Hadji 33'; Haroun 86'	Stadium: 20 August 1955 Stadium; Referee: Abdelali Ibrir

7 June 2024 Round 28	ES Ben Aknoun	1–1	ES Sétif	Belouizdad
16:45	Hachoud 82' (pen.)	Report		Stadium: 20 August 1955 Stadium; Referee: Haithem Ghouti

11 June 2024 Round 29	ES Ben Aknoun	0–1	CS Constantine	Belouizdad
16:45		Report	Benchaâ 90+8'	Stadium: 20 August 1955 Stadium; Referee: Yahia Dahar

14 June 2024 Round 30	MC El Bayadh	1–0	ES Ben Aknoun	El Bayadh
16:45	Belmiloud 29'	Report		Stadium: Zakaria Medjdoub Stadium; Referee: Mustapha Ghorbal

=== Algerian Cup ===
2 February 2024 Round of 64	US Souf	1–3	ES Ben Aknoun	El Oued
14:30	Chacha 89'	Report	Hadji 44', 86' (pen.); Atif 62'	Stadium: 1 November 1954 Stadium; Referee: Mehadji Tayeb Bouderbal

9 March 2024 Round of 32	ES Ben Aknoun	3–0	ASM Oran	Belouizdad
15:00	Zaouche 29'; Hachoud 56'; Toual 90'	Report		Stadium: 20 August 1955 Stadium; Referee: Tahar Boudjemaa
Note: ES Ben Aknoun Lineups: Zemmamouche, Hachoud, Bencherifa (substituted off) 70' (Guennoune (substituted on) 70'), Mesmoudi, Talah (substituted off) 46' (Messaoudène (substituted on) 46'), Benabdi, Boutiche (substituted off) 70' (Deghmani (substituted on) 70'), Aoudjane, Zaouche (substituted off) 90' (Bouguèche (substituted on) 90'), Haroun (substituted off) 76' (Toual (substituted on) 76'), Hadji.

30 March 2024 Round of 16	ES Ben Aknoun	1–0	JS Djijel	Belouizdad
15:00	Haroun 45+2'	Report		Stadium: 20 August 1955 Stadium; Referee: Yahia Dahar
Note: ES Ben Aknoun Lineups: Bousseder, Hachoud, Bencherifa, Mesmoudi, Haddouche, Benabdi, Boutiche, Aoudjane (substituted off) 46' (Toual (substituted on) 46'), Ait Mouloud (substituted off) 59' (Zaouche (substituted on) 59'), Haroun (substituted off) 81' (Guennoune (substituted on) 81'), Hadji.

13 April 2024 Quarter-final	CS Constantine	0–0 (a.e.t.) (5–4 p)	ES Ben Aknoun	Oran
17:30		Report		Stadium: Miloud Hadefi Stadium; Referee: Mustapha Ghorbal
	Penalties
	Dib (penalty scored); Rebiaï (penalty scored); Zaalani (penalty missed); Madani (penalty scored); Benchaâ (penalty missed); Temine (penalty scored); Meddahi (penalty scored)		(penalty missed) Hachoud; (penalty scored) Bencherifa; (penalty missed) Hadji; (penalty scored) Benabdi; (penalty scored) Daoud; (penalty scored) Boutiche; (penalty missed) Ait Mouloud
Note: ES Ben Aknoun Lineups: Bousseder, Hachoud, Bencherifa, Mesmoudi, Haddouche (substituted off) 113' (Messaoudène (substituted on) 113'), Benabdi, Boutiche, Toual (substituted off) 103' (Daoud (substituted on) 103'), Zaouche (substituted off) 75' (Ait Mouloud (substituted on) 75'), Haroun (substituted off) 96' (Guennoune (substituted on) 96'), Hadji.

== Squad information ==
=== Playing statistics ===
No.	Pos	Nat	Player	Total		Ligue 1		Algerian Cup	
No.	Pos	Nat	Player	Apps	Goals	Apps	Goals	Apps	Goals
Goalkeepers
1	GK	(Algeria) ALG	Mohamed Lamine Zemmamouche	9	0	8	0	1	0
18	GK	(Algeria) ALG	Yanis Bentchakal	1	0	1	0	0	0
24	GK	(Algeria) ALG	Tarek Bousseder	24	0	21	0	3	0
Defenders
2	DF	(Algeria) ALG	Zidane Guennoune	12	1	9	1	3	0
3	DF	(Algeria) ALG	Boualem Mesmoudi	15	1	12	1	3	0
4	DF	(Algeria) ALG	Ilyes Haddouche	28	1	25	1	3	0
6	DF	(Algeria) ALG	Zakaria Bencherifa	29	0	25	0	4	0
13	DF	(Algeria) ALG	Mehdi Messaoudène	8	0	6	0	2	0
15	DF	(Algeria) ALG	Fateh Talah	25	2	24	2	1	0
16	DF	(Algeria) ALG	Abdelkrim Oukali	4	0	4	0	0	0
22	DF	(Algeria) ALG	Hamza Ayad	0	0	0	0	0	0
25	DF	(Algeria) ALG	Ramy Oukali	0	0	0	0	0	0
26	DF	(Algeria) ALG	Tarek Belouchat	13	0	12	0	1	0
27	DF	(Algeria) ALG	Abderahmane Hachoud	33	8	29	7	4	1
Midfielders
5	MF	(Algeria) ALG	Mohamed Daoud	26	0	24	0	2	0
7	MF	(Algeria) ALG	Kheireddine Toual	17	3	14	2	3	1
8	MF	(Algeria) ALG	Zineddine Asli	15	0	14	0	1	0
10	MF	(Algeria) ALG	Chakib Aoudjane	28	1	25	1	3	0
14	FW	(Algeria) ALG	Abdelkader Boutiche	17	0	14	0	3	0
17	MF	(Algeria) ALG	Rayan Allam	0	0	0	0	0	0
20	MF	(Algeria) ALG	Yacine Deghmani	18	2	16	2	2	0
23	MF	(Algeria) ALG	Aziz Benabdi	16	1	13	1	3	0
66	MF	(Algeria) ALG	Malik Dilmi	1	0	1	0	0	0
Forwards
9	FW	(Algeria) ALG	Hadj Bouguèche	16	0	15	0	1	0
11	FW	(Algeria) ALG	Ahmed Zaouche	30	3	27	2	3	1
12	FW	(Algeria) ALG	Ali Haroun	17	3	14	2	3	1
21	FW	(Algeria) ALG	Abdelali Hadji	31	9	27	7	4	2
33	FW	(Algeria) ALG	Boualem Atif	2	1	1	0	1	1
51	FW	(Algeria) ALG	Rayane Ait Mouloud	14	1	12	1	2	0
77	FW	(Algeria) ALG	Badis Bouamama	3	0	3	0	0	0
Players transferred out during the season
3	DF	(Algeria) ALG	Adel Meguetounhif	0	0	0	0	0	0
12	MF	(Algeria) ALG	Reda Halilou	0	0	0	0	0	0
7	FW	(Algeria) ALG	Rayane Attia	6	0	6	0	0	0
14	FW	(Algeria) ALG	Yasser Bouabdallah	5	0	5	0	0	0
19	FW	(Algeria) ALG	Mouaauya Meklouche	7	0	7	0	0	0

Last updated: 14 June 2024
Source: soccerway.com

=== Goalscorers ===
As of 14 June 2024

Includes all competitive matches.

No.	Nat.	Player	Pos.	L 1	AC	TOTAL
21	(Algeria)	Abdelali Hadji	FW	7	2	9
27	(Algeria)	Abderahmane Hachoud	DF	7	1	8
11	(Algeria)	Ahmed Zaouche	FW	2	1	3
7	(Algeria)	Kheireddine Toual	MF	2	1	3
12	(Algeria)	Ali Haroun	FW	2	1	3
15	(Algeria)	Fateh Talah	DF	2	0	2
20	(Algeria)	Yacine Deghmani	MF	2	0	2
51	(Algeria)	Rayane Ait Mouloud	FW	1	0	1
33	(Algeria)	Boualem Atif	FW	0	1	1
10	(Algeria)	Chakib Aoudjane	MF	1	0	1
2	(Algeria)	Zidane Guennoune	DF	1	0	1
4	(Algeria)	Ilyes Haddouche	DF	1	0	1
3	(Algeria)	Boualem Mesmoudi	DF	1	0	1
Own Goals				0	0	0
Totals				31	7	38
