= Izz Alden Abu Aqoleh =

Jordanian footballer

Ezzedeen Abu Aqouleh
Personal information
- Full name: Ezzedeen Nayel Abu Aqouleh
- Date of birth: 19 November 2006 (age 19)
- Place of birth: Ar-Ramtha, Jordan
- Position: Striker

Team information
- Current team: Al-Ramtha
- Number: 11

Youth career
- Al-Ramtha

Senior career*
Years	Team	Apps	(Gls)
2023–	Al-Ramtha		

International career^{‡}
2022	Jordan U17	4	(2)
2024–	Jordan U20		(1)
- * Club domestic league appearances and goals as of 14 August 2025 ‡ National team caps and goals as of 14 August 2025

Ezzedeen Nayel Abu Aqouleh (Arabic: عز الدين أبو عاقولة; born 19 November 2006) is a Jordanian professional footballer who plays as a striker for the Jordanian club Al-Ramtha.

== Club career ==
=== Youth career ===
Born in Ar-Ramtha, Abu Aqouleh began his career at Al-Ramtha.

In 2024, Abu Aqouleh led the club to a Jordanian U-19 Elite League, becoming the top scorer of the competition, despite the impact that his eye injury and the lengthy recovery process had caused.

=== Al-Ramtha ===
He made his senior debut for the club during the 2023–24 Jordanian Pro League season, to which he became the youngest player to score a goal in the league, registering two goals as a substitute against Sahab age of 16 years, 11 months and 7 days.

Despite the promising start to his season and gaining popularity among Al-Ramtha's fanbase, Abu Aqouleh's career took a halt when a "fiery projectile" hit his eye, affecting his vision and requiring an operation. Al-Wehdat's management would go visit Abu Aqouleh to check on his status. Abu Aqouleh would later undergo a successful eye surgery in Russia. He would later reveal that the doctors in Jordan suggested for him to retire, to which he "did not like the doctor's words" at the time.

Abu Aqouleh went on a short trial at Saudi Pro League club Al-Riyadh, but preferred to gain more playing time domestically at Al-Ramtha and head abroad with more experience.

Abu Aqouleh would eventually participate with the club by the midway point of the 2024–25 Jordanian Pro League season.

== International career ==
Abu Aqouleh began his international career as a Jordan U-15 player, participating in the 2021 WAFF U-15 Championship held in Saudi Arabia.

He appeared at the following 2022 WAFF U-16 Championship, where he would score three goals and lead Jordan U-16 to a title win. He would subsequently be awarded as best player of the tournament.

Abu Aqouleh was named to the Jordan U-17 squad as a part of 2023 AFC U-17 Asian Cup qualification. to which his team was unable to qualify for the final tournament.

Upon healing from his eye injury, Abu Aqouleh returned to the national team set-up in November 2024, when Jordan U-20 manager Peter Meindertsma invited him to an internal training camp. His exclusion to the final 2025 AFC U-20 Asian Cup squad had caused Al-Ramtha fans confusion.
