= 2021 Arab Cup U-17 =

كأس العرب تحت 17 سنة

Tournament details
- Host country: Morocco
- Dates: Cancelled (originally 29 July – 15 August)
- Teams: 16 (from 2 confederations)

The 2021 Arab Cup U-17 was to be the fourth edition of the Arab Cup U-17. It was scheduled to be hosted by Morocco from 29 July to 15 August 2021. The tournament was initially scheduled to be held from 1 to 17 July, but was postponed indefinitely, and later cancelled.

== Teams ==
- Algeria
- Bahrain
- Djibouti
- Egypt
- Iraq
- Kuwait
- Lebanon
- Libya
- Mauritania
- Morocco (hosts)
- Palestine
- Saudi Arabia
- Somalia
- Tunisia
- United Arab Emirates
- Yemen

== Draw ==
The draw took place on 5 July 2021 in Cairo, Egypt.

== Group stage ==
The group winners and runners-up advance to the quarter-finals.

All times are local, WAT (UTC+1).

=== Group A ===
Pos	Team	Pld	W	D	L	GF	GA	GD	Pts	Qualification
1	Morocco (H)	0	0	0	0	0	0	0	0	Knockout stage
2	Palestine	0	0	0	0	0	0	0	0	Knockout stage
3	Saudi Arabia	0	0	0	0	0	0	0	0	
4	Kuwait	0	0	0	0	0	0	0	0	

First match(es) will be played: TBD. Source: UAFA
Rules for classification: Tiebreakers
(H) Hosts

Morocco	v	Palestine

Kuwait	v	Saudi Arabia

Morocco	v	Kuwait

Palestine	v	Saudi Arabia

Saudi Arabia	v	Morocco

Kuwait	v	Palestine

=== Group B ===
Pos	Team	Pld	W	D	L	GF	GA	GD	Pts	Qualification
1	Algeria	0	0	0	0	0	0	0	0	Knockout stage
2	United Arab Emirates	0	0	0	0	0	0	0	0	Knockout stage
3	Libya	0	0	0	0	0	0	0	0	
4	Djibouti	0	0	0	0	0	0	0	0	

First match(es) will be played: TBD. Source: UAFA
Rules for classification: Tiebreakers

Algeria	v	United Arab Emirates

Libya	v	Djibouti

United Arab Emirates	v	Libya

Algeria	v	Djibouti

Libya	v	Algeria

Djibouti	v	United Arab Emirates

=== Group C ===
Pos	Team	Pld	W	D	L	GF	GA	GD	Pts	Qualification
1	Tunisia	0	0	0	0	0	0	0	0	Knockout stage
2	Iraq	0	0	0	0	0	0	0	0	Knockout stage
3	Mauritania	0	0	0	0	0	0	0	0	
4	Yemen	0	0	0	0	0	0	0	0	

First match(es) will be played: TBD. Source: UAFA
Rules for classification: Tiebreakers

Tunisia	v	Iraq

Mauritania	v	Yemen

Tunisia	v	Yemen

Iraq	v	Mauritania

Mauritania	v	Tunisia

Yemen	v	Iraq

=== Group D ===
Pos	Team	Pld	W	D	L	GF	GA	GD	Pts	Qualification
1	Egypt	0	0	0	0	0	0	0	0	Knockout stage
2	Bahrain	0	0	0	0	0	0	0	0	Knockout stage
3	Somalia	0	0	0	0	0	0	0	0	
4	Lebanon	0	0	0	0	0	0	0	0	

First match(es) will be played: TBD. Source: UAFA
Rules for classification: Tiebreakers

Egypt	v	Bahrain

Somalia	v	Lebanon

Somalia	v	Bahrain

Lebanon	v	Egypt

Egypt	v	Somalia

Lebanon	v	Bahrain

== Knockout stage ==
In the knockout stage, penalty shoot-out is used to decide the winner if necessary (no extra time is played).

=== Bracket ===
Quarter-finals
–
Winner Group A
Runner-up Group B
–
Winner Group C
Runner-up Group D
–
Winner Group B
Runner-up Group A
–
Winner Group D
Runner-up Group C

Semi-finals
–
–

Final
–

=== Quarter-finals ===
Winner Group A	v	Runner-up Group B

Winner Group B	v	Runner-up Group A

Winner Group C	v	Runner-up Group D

Winner Group D	v	Runner-up Group C

=== Semi-finals ===
v

v

=== Final ===
v

== See also ==
- 2021 Arab Cup U-20
- 2021 Arab Women's Cup
