= Moslem Anatouf =

Algerian footballer (born 2006)

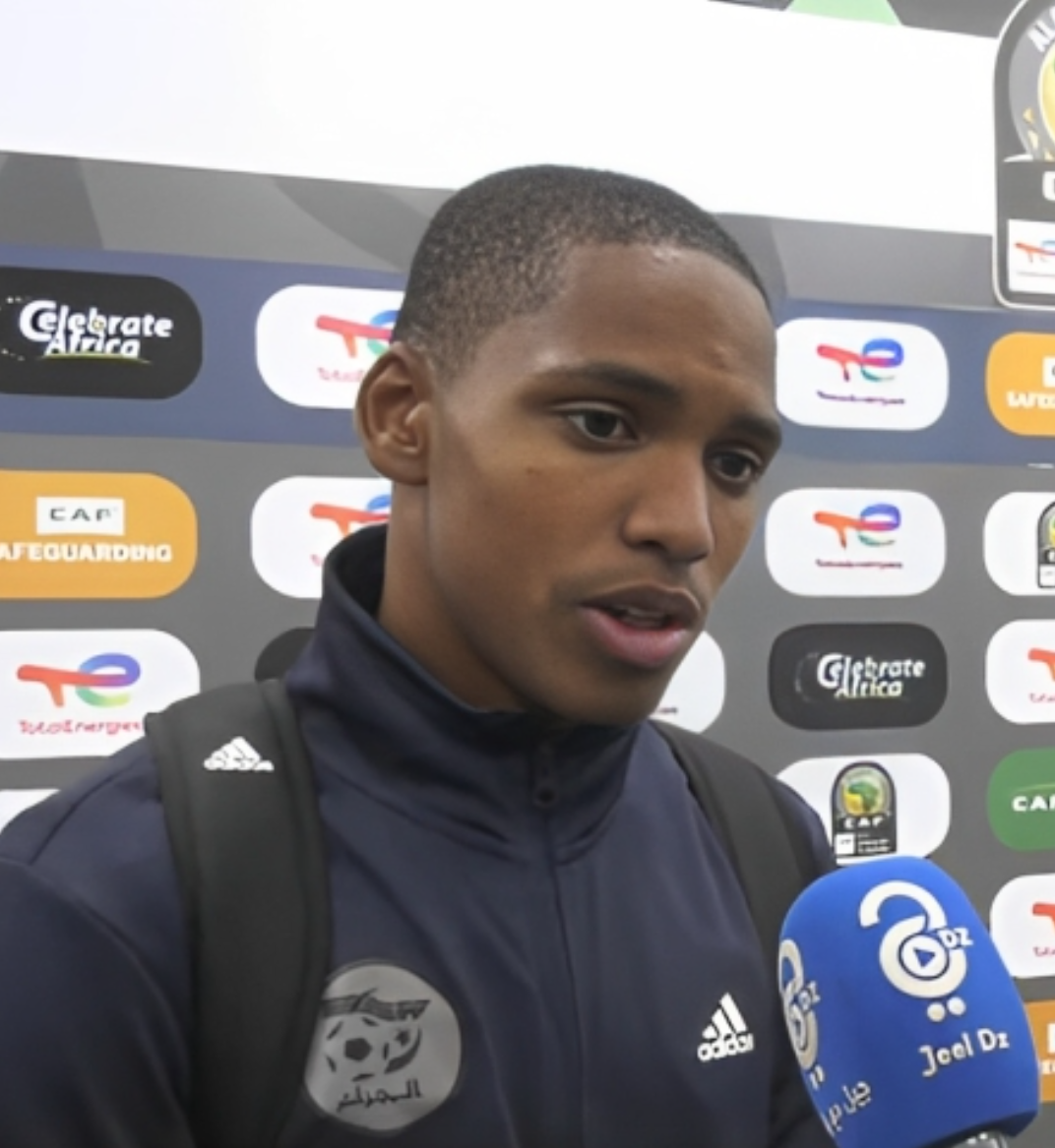

Personal information
- Date of birth: 8 May 2006 (age 20)
- Place of birth: Tindouf, Algeria
- Position: Forward

Team information
- Current team: CS Constantine (on loan from MC Alger)
- Number: 20

Youth career
- 2021–2023: Academie SBA FAF
- 2023–2025: MC Alger

Senior career*
Years	Team	Apps	(Gls)
2025–	MC Alger	12	(1)
2026–	→ CS Constantine (loan)	0	(0)

International career
2022–2023	Algeria U17	11	(7)
2023–	Algeria U20	3	(0)
- * Club domestic league appearances and goals as of 9 August 2026

Moslem Anatouf (Arabic: مسلم عناتوف; born 8 May 2006) is an Algerian footballer who plays as a forward for CS Constantine, on loan from MC Alger.

== Club career ==
Anatouf began his career at a local academy in Tindouf, where he was born, before joining the Academie de Sidi Bel Abbès in 2021.

On 11 October 2023, he was named by English newspaper The Guardian as one of the best players born in 2006 worldwide.

On 8 August 2026, he was loaned to CS Constantine.

== International career ==
Anatouf was called up to the Algerian under-17 team for the 2022 Arab Cup U-17, and was named player of the tournament, after scoring twice in six games, and helping his team win the tournament. He was called up again for the Algiers U17 International Tournament in March 2023, finishing with three goals in three appearances.

He was named in the Algerian squad for the 2023 Africa U-17 Cup of Nations, and gave an interview before the opening game against Somalia, stating that Algeria would have to begin the tournament well. In the 22nd minute of the game against Somalia, he intercepted a misplaced back-pass from Somali defender Abdirahman Ahmed, taking the ball past goalkeeper Abdikadir Ali with his first touch and scoring. He scored Algeria's second in the 51st minute, finishing from a corner, as Algeria won the game 2–0, and Anatouf was named man of the match. Algeria lost the second game of the tournament 3–0 to Senegal, with Anatouf apologising to fans after the game for the "mistakes" the team made.

== Personal life ==
Anatouf has expressed his admiration for Nigerian striker Victor Osimhen, while stating that he wishes to emulate French striker Kylian Mbappé.
