= 2025 WAFF U-17 Championship =

بطولة اتحاد غرب آسيا الحادية عشرة للناشئين 2025

Tournament details
- Host country: Jordan
- City: Aqaba
- Dates: 27 October – 4 November
- Teams: 7 (from 1 sub-confederation)
- Venue: 1 (in 1 host city)

Final positions
- Champions: Saudi Arabia (2nd title)
- Runners-up: Lebanon

Tournament statistics
- Matches played: 12
- Goals scored: 23 (1.92 per match)
- Top scorer(s): (Iraq) Mustafa Al-Nasseri (Syria) Abdulhadi Al-Hariri (Lebanon) Adnan Madi (2 goals)
- Best player: (Saudi Arabia) Khaled Sharahili
- Best goalkeeper: (Lebanon) Jason Fenianos

The 2025 WAFF U-17 Championship was the 12th edition of the WAFF U-17 Championship organised by the WAFF. It was held in Aqaba, Jordan from 27 October to 4 November. Seven members participated in the competition.

Players born on or after 1 January 2009 were eligible to participate in the competition.

Syria were the defending champions but were eliminated at the semi-finals. Saudi Arabia won its second title, defeating Lebanon 5–3 on penalties.

== Draw ==
The draw ceremony took place on 16 October 2025, and the seven teams were divided into two groups. Teams in the same group in the AFC U-17 qualifiers were guaranteed not to be in the same group in this tournament.

== Group stage ==
=== Group A ===
Pos	Team	Pld	W	D	L	GF	GA	GD	Pts	Qualification
1	Saudi Arabia	3	2	1	0	3	1	+2	7	Knockout stage
2	Lebanon	3	1	2	0	1	0	+1	5	Knockout stage
3	Iraq	3	1	0	2	5	3	+2	3	
4	Kuwait	3	0	1	2	0	5	−5	1	

Source: WAFF
Rules for classification: Group stage tiebreakers
27 October 2025
15:00

Saudi Arabia	2–1	Iraq
Maimani 31'; Alaa 90+7'		Haidar 90'

Al-Aqaba Stadium, Aqaba

27 October 2025
21:00

Kuwait	0–0	Lebanon

Al-Aqaba Stadium, Aqaba

29 October 2025
18:00

Iraq	4–0	Kuwait
Al-Nasseri 6', 28'; Hareb 55'; Jale 90+4'

Al-Aqaba Stadium, Aqaba

29 October 2025
21:00

Lebanon	0–0	Saudi Arabia

Al-Aqaba Stadium, Aqaba

31 October 2025
15:00

Lebanon	1–0	Iraq
Madi 45+2'

Al-Aqaba Stadium, Aqaba

31 October 2025
21:00

Saudi Arabia	1–0	Kuwait
Sharahili 80'

Al-Aqaba Stadium, Aqaba

=== Group B ===
Pos	Team	Pld	W	D	L	GF	GA	GD	Pts	Qualification
1	Syria	2	2	0	0	5	2	+3	6	Knockout stage
2	Jordan (H)	2	1	0	1	1	1	0	3	Knockout stage
3	Palestine	2	0	0	2	2	5	−3	0	

Source: WAFF
Rules for classification: Group stage tiebreakers
(H) Hosts
27 October 2025
18:00

Jordan	1–0	Palestine
Al-Malahi 48'	Report

Al-Aqaba Stadium, Aqaba

29 October 2025
15:00

Palestine	2–4	Syria
Obeid 5'; Kafafi 90'	Report	A. Al-Hariri 39'; B. Al-Hariri 44'; Al-Haji 62'; Faraj

Al-Aqaba Stadium, Aqaba

31 October 2025
18:00

Syria	1–0	Jordan
A. Al-Hariri 66'	Report

Al-Aqaba Stadium, Aqaba

== Knockout stage ==
=== Semi-finals ===
2 November 2025
17:00

Syria	1–1	Lebanon
Bakour 60'	Report	Bedran 11'
Penalties
Al-Faraj (penalty scored); Al-Jassem (penalty scored); A. Al-Hariri (penalty missed); B. Al-Hariri (penalty scored); Bakour (penalty missed); Hamoud (penalty missed)	3–4	Kiami (penalty scored); Assaf (penalty scored); Daher (penalty missed); Chahine (penalty missed); Abi Mansour (penalty scored); Assy (penalty scored)

Al-Aqaba Stadium, Aqaba

2 November 2025
20:00

Saudi Arabia	1–1	Jordan
Al-Hazemi 13'	Report	Abu Saad 89'
Penalties
Al-Batli (penalty missed); Al-Bayoumi (penalty scored); Sharahili (penalty scored); Drahihm (penalty missed); Al-Hashem (penalty scored); Al-Malfi (penalty scored)	4–3	Qadadeh (penalty missed); Tbaishat (penalty missed); Amro (penalty scored); Sarhan (penalty scored); Marqa (penalty scored); Al-Jawhari (penalty missed)

Al-Aqaba Stadium, Aqaba

=== Final ===
4 November 2025
19:00

Lebanon	1–1	Saudi Arabia
Madi 73'	Report	Al-Nabi 89'
Penalties
Kiami (penalty missed); Assaf (penalty scored); Safieddine (penalty scored); Assy (penalty scored)	3–5	Al-Nabi (penalty scored); Al-Batli (penalty scored); Sharahili (penalty scored); Al-Mani (penalty scored); Al-Hashem (penalty scored)

Al-Aqaba Stadium, Aqaba

== Goalscorers ==
There were 23 goals scored in 12 matches, for an average of 1.92 goals per match.

2 goals

- (Iraq) Mustafa Al-Nasseri
- (Syria) Abdulhadi Al-Hariri
- (Lebanon) Adnan Madi

1 goal

- (Saudi Arabia) Ammar Maimani
- (Saudi Arabia) Faisal Alaa
- (Saudi Arabia) Khaled Sharahili
- (Saudi Arabia) Ali Al-Hazemi
- (Saudi Arabia) Yazan Al-Nabi
- (Iraq) Montader Haidar
- (Iraq) Alamir Haidar Hareb
- (Iraq) Yousif Jale
- (Jordan) Sleman Elyan Al-Malahi
- (Jordan) Mamdouh Abu Saad
- (Palestine) Jamal Obeid
- (Palestine) Adam Kafafi
- (Syria) Bashar Al-Hariri
- (Syria) Mahmoud Al-Haji
- (Syria) Ahmad Faraj
- (Syria) Imad Bakour
- (Lebanon) Youssef Bedran
