= Mahmoud Al-Tmaizi =

Jordanian footballer (born 2008)

Personal information
- Full name: Mahmoud Mohanad Al-Tmaizi
- Date of birth: 4 April 2008 (age 18)
- Place of birth: Jordan
- Position: Striker

Team information
- Current team: Al-Hussein
- Number: 9

Youth career
- 6 Yard
- –2026: Jordan Knights

Senior career*
Years	Team	Apps	(Gls)
2026–	Al-Hussein	3	(1)

International career^{‡}
2023	Jordan U15	3	(2)
2024	Jordan U17	7	(0)
2025–	Jordan U20	2	(0)
- * Club domestic league appearances and goals as of 8 May 2026 ‡ National team caps and goals as of 15 November 2025

Mahmoud Mohanad Al-Tmaizi (Arabic: محمود مهند الطميزي; born 4 April 2008), also known as Gaya (Arabic: قايا), is a Jordanian footballer who plays as a striker for Jordanian Pro League club Al-Hussein.

== Club career ==
=== Early career ===
Al-Tmaizi first picked up the sport during his schooling days, before joining the 6 Yard Football Academy, and later joining Jordan Knights. He gained his nickname during his youth days when he initially referred to the sport as "gaya", to which his youth manager started to refer to Al-Tmaizi as Gaya and it subsequently stuck with him in later years.

=== Al-Hussein ===
On 27 January 2026, Al-Tmaizi signed his first professional contract with Al-Hussein for three and a half seasons. On 6 February 2026, he made his debut for the club as a substitute and went on to score a goal on their 5–1 victory against Shabab Al-Ordon. On 8 May 2026, Al-Tmaizi won the Jordanian Pro League title with Al-Hussein after only playing one match with them.

== International career ==
Al-Tmaizi began his international career as a Jordan under-15 player. He participated in the 2023 WAFF U-15 Championship held in Salalah, where he scored two goals against Saudi Arabia. He was then called up to the under-17 team ahead of the 2025 AFC U-17 Asian Cup qualification.

Al-Tmaizi received his first under-20 call-up in 2025, where he participated in two friendlies against Russia on 13 and 15 November.
