= Lebanon national under-17 football team =

National association football team

Lebanon under-17
- Nickname(s): ناشئو الأرز (The Junior Cedars)
- Association: Lebanese Football Association (LFA)
- Confederation: AFC (Asia)
- Sub-confederation: WAFF (West Asia)
- Head coach: Ramy El Ladki
- Home stadium: Various
- FIFA code: LBN
First colours	Second colours

First international
- Lebanon 2–4 Qatar (Tehran, Iran; 25 June 2000)

Biggest win
- Lebanon 7–2 Kyrgyzstan (Tehran, Iran; 1 July 2000)

Biggest defeat
- Lebanon 0–9 Qatar (Qatar; 13 October 2003); Lebanon 0–9 Egypt (Sig, Algeria; 27 August 2022)

AFC U-17 Asian Cup
- Appearances: 1 (first in 2027)
- Best result: To be determined (2027)

Arab Cup U-17
- Appearances: 1 (first in 2022)
- Best result: Group stage (2022)

WAFF U-17 Championship
- Appearances: 9 (first in 2005)
- Best result: Champions (2026)
Medal record
Men's football
WAFF U-17 Championship
Gold medal – first place	2026 Jordan
Silver medal – second place	2022 Jordan
Silver medal – second place	2025 Jordan

The Lebanon national under-17 football team (Arabic: منتخب لبنان تحت 17 سنة لكرة القدم) is the national under-17 football team of Lebanon and is controlled by the Lebanese Football Association. The team also serves as the national under-16 and national under-15 football teams of Lebanon.

While the team is yet to qualify for the FIFA U-17 World Cup, they qualfied for the AFC U-17 Asian Cup in 2027. Lebanon also participate in the Arab Cup U-17 and WAFF U-17 Championship. They won the WAFF U-17 Championship in 2026, becoming the first Lebanese men's national team to win a title, and finished runners-up in 2022 and 2025.

== Competitive record ==
=== FIFA U-17 World Cup ===
FIFA U-17 World Cup record										Qualification record						
Host nation(s) and year	Round	Pos	Pld	W	D	L	GF	GA	Squad	Outcome	Pld	W	D	L	GF	GA
(China) 1985	did not enter									did not enter						
(Canada) 1987	did not enter									did not enter						
(Scotland) 1989	did not enter									did not enter						
(Italy) 1991	did not enter									did not enter						
(Japan) 1993	did not enter									did not enter						
(Ecuador) 1995	did not enter									did not enter						
(Egypt) 1997	did not enter									did not enter						
(New Zealand) 1999	did not enter									did not enter						
(Trinidad and Tobago) 2001	did not qualify									The 2000 AFC U-17 Championship served as the qualifying tournament						
(Finland) 2003	withdrew									withdrew						
(Peru) 2005	did not qualify									The 2004 AFC U-17 Championship served as the qualifying tournament						
(South Korea) 2007	did not qualify									The 2006 AFC U-17 Championship served as the qualifying tournament						
(Nigeria) 2009	did not qualify									The 2008 AFC U-16 Championship served as the qualifying tournament						
(Mexico) 2011	did not qualify									The 2010 AFC U-16 Championship served as the qualifying tournament						
(United Arab Emirates) 2013	withdrew									withdrew						
(Chile) 2015	did not qualify									The 2014 AFC U-16 Championship served as the qualifying tournament						
(India) 2017	did not qualify									The 2016 AFC U-16 Championship served as the qualifying tournament						
(Brazil) 2019	did not qualify									The 2018 AFC U-16 Championship served as the qualifying tournament						
(Indonesia) 2023	did not qualify									The 2023 AFC U-17 Asian Cup served as the qualifying tournament						
(Qatar) 2025	withdrew									withdrew						
(Qatar) 2026	did not qualify									The 2026 AFC U-17 Asian Cup served as the qualifying tournament						
(Qatar) 2027	to be determined									The 2027 AFC U-17 Asian Cup will serve as the qualifying tournament						
Total	—	0/21	—	—	—	—	—	—	—	Total	—	—	—	—	—	—

=== AFC U-17 Asian Cup ===
AFC U-17 Asian Cup record										Qualification record						
Host nation(s) and year	Round	Pos	Pld	W	D	L	GF	GA	Squad	Outcome	Pld	W	D	L	GF	GA
(Qatar) 1985	did not enter									did not enter						
(Qatar) 1986	did not enter									did not enter						
(Thailand) 1988	did not enter									did not enter						
(United Arab Emirates) 1990	did not enter									did not enter						
(Saudi Arabia) 1992	did not enter									did not enter						
(Qatar) 1994	did not enter									did not enter						
(Thailand) 1996	did not enter									did not enter						
(Qatar) 1998	did not enter									did not enter						
(Vietnam) 2000	did not qualify									4th of 5	4	1	0	3	9	13
(United Arab Emirates) 2002	withdrew									withdrew						
(Japan) 2004	did not qualify									3rd of 3	2	0	0	2	0	10
(Singapore) 2006	did not qualify									3rd of 3	2	0	0	2	2	9
(Uzbekistan) 2008	did not qualify									4th of 6	5	2	0	3	9	15
(Uzbekistan) 2010	did not qualify									5th of 5	4	0	0	4	1	12
(Iran) 2012	withdrew									withdrew						
(Thailand) 2014	did not qualify									3rd of 5	4	2	0	2	6	12
(India) 2016	did not qualify									4th of 4	3	0	0	3	2	11
(Malaysia) 2018	did not qualify									4th of 5	4	1	0	3	3	8
(Bahrain) ~~2020~~	cancelled									4th of 4	3	0	0	3	4	9
(Thailand) 2023	did not qualify									5th of 5	4	0	1	3	2	7
(Saudi Arabia) 2025	withdrew									withdrew						
(Saudi Arabia) 2026	did not qualify									3rd of 5	4	1	3	0	4	2
(Uzbekistan) 2027	qualified									1st of 5	4	4	0	0	15	3
Total	—	1/22	—	—	—	—	—	—	—	Total	43	11	4	28	57	111

=== Arab Cup U-17 ===
Arab Cup U-17 record
Host nation(s) and year	Round	Pos	Pld	W	D	L	GF	GA	Squad
(Saudi Arabia) 2011	did not participate								
(Tunisia) 2012	did not participate								
(Qatar) 2014	did not participate								
(Morocco) ~~2021~~	cancelled								
(Algeria) 2022	Group stage	15th of 16	3	0	1	2	0	15	—
Total	Best: group stage	1/4	3	0	1	2	0	15	—

=== WAFF U-17 Championship ===
WAFF U-17 Championship record
Host nation(s) and year	Round	Pos	Pld	W	D	L	GF	GA	Squad
(Iran) 2005	3rd–4th place round	4th of 6	4	0	1	3	3	14	—
(Syria) 2007	Group stage	5th of 5	4	0	1	3	2	20	—
(Jordan) 2009	did not participate								
(Palestine) 2013	did not participate								
(Jordan) 2015	did not participate								
(Jordan) 2018	did not participate								
(Jordan) 2019	7th–9th place round	8th of 9	4	1	0	3	3	4	—
(Saudi Arabia) 2021	Group stage	7th of 9	2	0	0	2	1	5	—
(Jordan) 2022	Runners-up	2nd of 8	5	3	0	2	5	2	—
(Oman) 2023	Group stage	8th of 8	3	0	0	3	0	6	—
(Jordan) 2024	Group stage	6th of 9	2	1	0	1	3	1	—
(Jordan) 2025	Runners-up	2nd of 6	3	1	4	0	3	2	—
(Jordan) 2026	Champions	1st of 7	5	2	2	1	6	2	—
Total	Best: runners-up	9/13	29	8	8	18	26	56	—

== Results and fixtures ==
The following is a list of match results in the last 12 months, as well as any future matches that have been scheduled.

Win Draw Loss Fixture

=== 2026 ===
17 August 2026 Friendly	Lebanon	2–2	Syria	Jounieh, Lebanon
15:00 UTC+3	Farchoukh 90+2'; Messelmani 90+3'	Report	5'; 85'	Stadium: Fouad Chehab Stadium

19 August 2026 Friendly	Lebanon	2–2	Syria	Jounieh, Lebanon
21:00 UTC+3	Farchoukh 54'; Kurdi 76'	Report	53'; 90'	Stadium: Fouad Chehab Stadium

16 September 2026 Friendly	Armenia	1–2	Lebanon	Yerevan, Armenia
16:00 UTC+4	58'	Report	Messelmani 31'; Mshawrab 87'	Stadium: Technical Center-Academy of the Football Federation of Armenia

19 September 2026 Friendly	Armenia	0–2	Lebanon	Yerevan, Armenia
16:00 UTC+4		Report	Farchoukh 2'; Imad 80'	Stadium: Technical Center-Academy of the Football Federation of Armenia

26 September 2026 2026 WAFF U-17 Championship GS	Lebanon	4–0	Syria	Aqaba, Jordan
20:00 UTC+3	El Zohbi 24'; Farchoukh 64'; Kurdi 82'; Kammouni 90+1'	Report		Stadium: Al-Aqaba Stadium

28 September 2026 2026 WAFF U-17 Championship GS	Palestine	0–1	Lebanon	Aqaba, Jordan
17:00 UTC+3		Report	Farchoukh 14' (pen.)	Stadium: Al-Aqaba Stadium

30 September 2026 2026 WAFF U-17 Championship GS	Yemen	2–1	Lebanon	Aqaba, Jordan
17:00 UTC+3	Mahmoud 61' (pen.); Aziz 90+2'	Report	El Barouk 40'	Stadium: Al-Aqaba Stadium

3 October 2026 2026 WAFF U-17 Championship SF	Jordan	0–0 (1–3 p)	Lebanon	Aqaba, Jordan
17:00 UTC+3		Report		Stadium: Al-Aqaba Stadium
	Penalties
	Al-Fawadleh (penalty missed); Al-Riyahneh (penalty missed); Qadadeh (penalty scored); Abu Sheikha (penalty missed)		Madi (penalty scored); Kammouni (penalty scored); El Barouk (penalty scored); Messelmani (penalty missed)

5 October 2026 2026 WAFF U-17 Championship F	Yemen	0–0 (3–4 p)	Lebanon	Aqaba, Jordan
19:00 UTC+3		Report		Stadium: Al-Aqaba Stadium; Referee: Ammar Bdor (Syria)
	Penalties
	Sailan (penalty missed); Al-Wasabi (penalty scored); Mohammed Aziz (penalty scored); Mahmoud (penalty scored); Al-Sanhani (penalty missed)		Madi (penalty missed); Hamieh (penalty scored); El Barouk (penalty scored); Kurdi (penalty scored); El Zohbi (penalty scored)

8 November 2026 2027 AFC U-17 Asian Cup qualification	Brunei	0–7	Lebanon	Salalah, Oman
20:00 UTC+4		Report	Mouarkech 1'; Al Zohbi 3'; Farchoukh 33'; Barouk 68', 81'; Imad 84'; El Awad 88' (pen.)	Stadium: Al-Saada Sports Complex; Referee: Alimardon Bainazarov (Kyrgyzstan)

11 November 2026 2027 AFC U-17 Asian Cup qualification	Lebanon	2–1	Oman	Salalah, Oman
17:00 UTC+4	Hamieh 66'; El Awad 90+3'	Report	A. R. Al Hashemi 71'	Stadium: Al-Saada Sports Complex; Referee: Ali Al-Qahtani (Saudi Arabia)

14 November 2026 2027 AFC U-17 Asian Cup qualification	Kuwait	1–4	Lebanon	Salalah, Oman
20:00 UTC+4	Al-Mulla 81'	Report	Mouarkech 34', 69'; Hamieh 54'; Kirdi 90+6'	Stadium: Al-Saada Sports Complex; Referee: Suhail Abdulla Ali Al-Mulla (United Arab Emirates)

20 November 2026 2027 AFC U-17 Asian Cup qualification	Lebanon	2–1	Bahrain	Salalah, Oman
17:00 UTC+4	Al Zohbi 64'; Hamieh 89'	Report	Ahmed 40'	Stadium: Al-Saada Sports Complex; Referee: John Mike Basinang (Philippines)

== Players ==
The following 23 players were called up for the 2027 AFC U-17 Asian Cup qualification matches between 8 and 20 November 2026.

No.	Pos.	Player	Date of birth (age)	Club
1	GK	Mehdi Makki	6 August 2010 (age 16)	(Lebanese Football Association) Nejmeh
21	GK	Isaac Kdouh	17 January 2010 (age 16)	(Football Australia) Bulls FC Academy
23	GK	Karim Taha	25 October 2010 (age 16)	(Lebanese Football Association) Safa
2	DF	Ralph Imad	25 June 2010 (age 16)	(Lebanese Football Association) Athletico
3	DF	Jawad Messelmani	27 September 2010 (age 16)	(Lebanese Football Association) Nejmeh
4	DF	Mohammad Madi (captain)	26 August 2010 (age 16)	(Lebanese Football Association) Ahed
5	DF	Omar Dalal	1 January 2010 (age 16)	(Lebanese Football Association) Nejmeh
12	DF	Mohammad Nassar	25 January 2010 (age 16)	(Lebanese Football Association) Ahed
13	DF	Georgio Elias	25 January 2010 (age 16)	(Lebanese Football Association) Athletico
14	DF	Aram Kyomjian	14 July 2010 (age 16)	(Lebanese Football Association) Athletico
15	DF	Roda Matar	23 April 2010 (age 16)	(Lebanese Football Association) Ahed
6	MF	Mohammad Chahoud	16 September 2010 (age 16)	(Lebanese Football Association) Nejmeh
8	MF	Mohammad Hamieh	3 May 2010 (age 16)	(Lebanese Football Association) Ahed
10	MF	Sari Hanoun	13 January 2010 (age 16)	(Lebanese Football Association) Ahed
16	MF	Jad El Barouk	12 January 2010 (age 16)	(Lebanese Football Association) Athletico
18	MF	Ramez Mshawrab	5 October 2010 (age 16)	(Lebanese Football Association) Nejmeh
22	MF	Wisam El-Awad	19 January 2010 (age 16)	(German Football Association) 1. FC Kaiserslautern
7	FW	Jad El Zohbi	25 July 2010 (age 16)	(Lebanese Football Association) Nejmeh
9	FW	Ibrahim Farchoukh	19 July 2010 (age 16)	(Lebanese Football Association) Safa
11	FW	Malek Mouarkesh	15 June 2010 (age 16)	(Lebanese Football Association) Sanharib
17	FW	Hussein Kurdi	13 February 2010 (age 16)	(Lebanese Football Association) Nejmeh
19	FW	Mohammed Kdouh	26 March 2010 (age 16)	(German Football Association) JFV Calenberger Land
20	FW	Mehdi Kammouni	19 February 2010 (age 16)	(Lebanese Football Association) Ahed

== See also ==
- Lebanon national football team
- Lebanon national under-23 football team
- Lebanon national under-20 football team
- Lebanon women's national under-17 football team
- Football in Lebanon
