= 2005 WAFF U-15 Championship =

Tournament details
- Host country: Iran
- City: Karaj
- Dates: 23–29 July
- Teams: 6 (from 1 sub-confederation)
- Venue(s): 2 (in 1 host city)

Final positions
- Champions: Iran (1st title)
- Runners-up: Syria
- Third place: Iraq
- Fourth place: Lebanon

Tournament statistics
- Matches played: 11
- Goals scored: 53 (4.82 per match)

2005 WAFF U-15 Championship was the first edition of the WAFF U-15 Championship. A WAFF youth football championship organised by the West Asian Football Federation (WAFF) for the men's under-15 national teams of West Asia. It was held in Karaj, Iran from 23 August to 29 July 2005.

== Format ==
The groups winner and the second-placed team of the two groups in the first round played in a single round-robin format, qualified for the semi-finals.

== Participating nations ==
6 West Asian Federation teams entered the competition.

- Jordan
- Lebanon
- Iran (hosts)
- Iraq
- Palestine
- Syria

== Group stage ==
=== Group A ===
Pos	Team	Pld	W	D	L	GF	GA	GD	Pts	Qualification
1	Iran	2	1	1	0	9	0	+9	4	Final stage
2	Iraq	2	1	1	0	8	0	+8	4	Final stage
3	Palestine	2	0	0	2	0	17	−17	0	

Source: West Asian Football Federation
23 July 2005
18:00

Iraq	8–0	Palestine

Shariati Karaj 2, Karaj

24 July 2005
18:00

Iran	0–0	Iraq

Shariati Karaj 1, Karaj

25 July 2005
17:00

Palestine	0–9	Iran

Shariati Karaj 1, Karaj

=== Group B ===
Pos	Team	Pld	W	D	L	GF	GA	GD	Pts	Qualification
1	Syria	2	2	0	0	11	2	+9	6	Final stage
2	Lebanon	2	0	1	1	3	5	−2	1	Final stage
3	Jordan	2	0	1	1	1	8	−7	1	

Source: West Asian Football Federation
23 July 2005
18:00

Syria	7–0	Jordan

Shariati Karaj 1, Karaj

24 July 2005
18:00

Lebanon	2–4	Syria

Shariati Karaj 2, Karaj

25 July 2005
17:00

Jordan	1–1	Lebanon

Shariati Karaj 2, Karaj

== Knockout stage ==
=== Bracket ===
Semi-finals
27 July
Iran	4
Lebanon	0
27 July
Syria	2
Iraq	1

Final
29 July
Iran	4
Syria	1
Third place
29 July
Lebanon	0
Iraq	5

=== Semi-finals ===
27 July 2005
18:00

Iran	4–0	Lebanon

Shariati Karaj 1, Karaj
27 July 2005
18:00

Syria	2–1	Iraq

Shariati Karaj 2, Karaj

=== Fifth place ===
28 July 2005
18:00

Palestine	1–3	Jordan

Shariati Karaj 1, Karaj

=== Third place ===
29 July 2005
17:30

Lebanon	0–5	Iraq

Shariati Karaj 2, Karaj

=== Final ===
29 July 2005
17:30

Iran	4–1	Syria

Shariati Karaj 1, Karaj

== Champion ==
2005 WAFF U-15 Championship champion

Iran
First title

== Final standing ==
Rank	Team
1st place, gold medalist(s)	Iran
2nd place, silver medalist(s)	Syria
3rd place, bronze medalist(s)	Iraq
4	Lebanon
5	Jordan
6	Palestine
