= Mohamed Bensaïd Stadium =

Stadium in Mostaganem, Algeria

Coordinates: 35.9240°N 0.1052°E

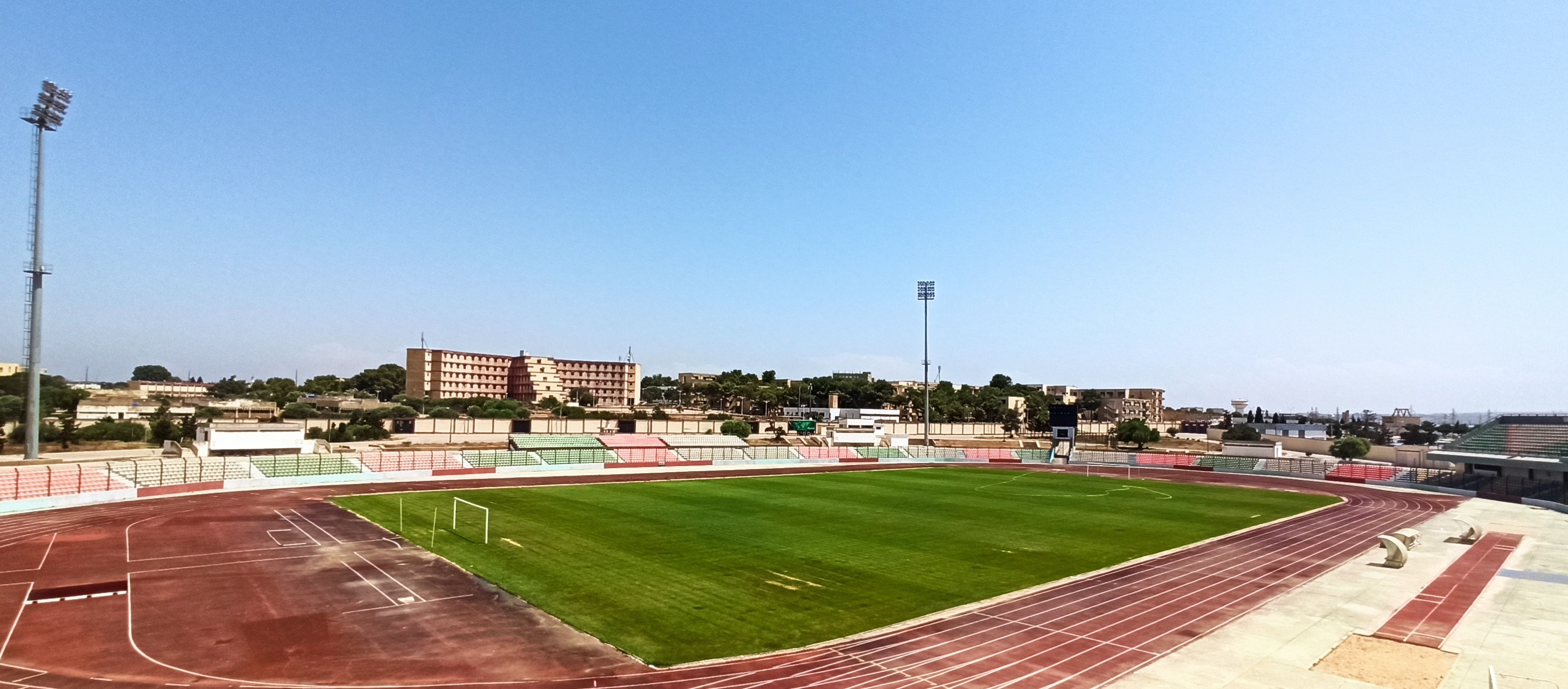
- Interactive map of Mohamed Bensaïd Stadium
- Full name: Mohamed Bensaïd Stadium
- Location: Route de Relizane; Mostaganem, Algeria
- Owner: OPOW de Mostaganem
- Capacity: 18,000
- Surface: Grass

Construction
- Opened: 25 January 1990

Tenants
- ES Mostaganem; WA Mostaganem

Mohamed Bensaïd Stadium (Arabic: ملعب محمد بن سعيد), is a multi-use stadium in Mostaganem, Algeria, it is a part of Complexe Commandant Ferradj. It is currently used mostly for football matches and is the home ground of ES Mostaganem and WA Mostaganem. The stadium holds 18,000 spectators.
