= 2011 Arab Cup U-17 =

Tournament details
- Host country: Saudi Arabia
- Dates: July 14 – July 27
- Teams: 8 (from 2 confederations)
- Venue(s): Prince Abdullah Al-Faisal Stadium, Jeddah

Final positions
- Champions: Saudi Arabia (1st title)
- Runners-up: Syria
- Third place: Sudan
- Fourth place: Algeria

Tournament statistics
- Matches played: 16
- Goals scored: 54 (3.38 per match)

The 2011 Arab Cup U-17 was the first edition of the Arab Cup U-17, an association football tournament between Arabic countries. It was played in July 2011 and hosted by Saudi Arabia.

== Participants ==
- Algeria
- Iraq
- Kuwait
- Morocco
- Palestine
- Saudi Arabia
- Sudan
- Syria

== Teams and Draw ==
The teams were drawn into the following groups:

Group A	Group B
Saudi Arabia (host); Syria; Kuwait; Palestine	Sudan; Iraq; Algeria; Morocco

== Group stage ==
=== Group A ===
Team	Pld	W	D	L	GF	GA	GD	Pts
Saudi Arabia	3	3	0	0	9	1	+8	9
Syria	3	1	1	1	7	4	+3	4
Kuwait	3	1	1	1	3	3	0	4
Palestine	3	0	0	3	1	12	−11	0

14 July 2011

Saudi Arabia	3–1	Syria

Prince Abdullah Al Faisal Stadium, Jeddah
14 July 2011

Kuwait	2–1	Palestine

Prince Abdullah Al Faisal Stadium, Jeddah

17 July 2011

Kuwait	0–1	Saudi Arabia

Prince Abdullah Al Faisal Stadium, Jeddah
17 July 2011

Palestine	0–5	Syria

Prince Abdullah Al Faisal Stadium, Jeddah

20 July 2011

Syria	1–1	Kuwait

Prince Abdullah Al Faisal Stadium, Jeddah
20 July 2011

Saudi Arabia	5–0	Palestine

Prince Abdullah Al Faisal Stadium, Jeddah

=== Group B ===
Team	Pld	W	D	L	GF	GA	GD	Pts
Algeria	3	2	1	0	3	0	+3	7
Sudan	3	1	2	0	4	3	+1	5
Morocco	3	1	1	1	3	3	0	4
Iraq	3	0	0	3	2	6	−4	0

15 July 2011

Sudan	3–2	Iraq

Prince Abdullah Al Faisal Stadium, Jeddah
15 July 2011

Algeria	2–0	Morocco

Prince Abdullah Al Faisal Stadium, Jeddah

18 July 2011

Iraq	0–2	Morocco

Prince Abdullah Al Faisal Stadium, Jeddah
18 July 2011

Sudan	0–0	Algeria

Prince Abdullah Al Faisal Stadium, Jeddah

21 July 2011

Morocco	1–1	Sudan

Prince Abdullah Al Faisal Stadium, Jeddah
21 July 2011

Algeria	1–0	Iraq

Prince Abdullah Al Faisal Stadium, Jeddah

== Knockout stage ==
Semi-finals
24 July - Jeddah
Saudi Arabia	4
Sudan	3
24 July - Jeddah
Algeria	2
Syria	3

Final
2 November - ...
Saudi Arabia	4
Syria	3
Third place
2 November - ...
Sudan	2
Algeria	1

=== Semi-finals ===
24 July 2011

Saudi Arabia	4–3	Sudan

Prince Abdullah Al Faisal Stadium, Jeddah
24 July 2011

Algeria	2–3	Syria

Prince Abdullah Al Faisal Stadium, Jeddah

=== Third place playoff ===
26 July 2011

Sudan	2–1	Algeria

Prince Abdullah Al Faisal Stadium, Jeddah

=== Final ===
27 July 2011

Saudi Arabia	4–3	Syria

Prince Abdullah Al Faisal Stadium, Jeddah

== Winners ==
2011 Arab U-17 Championship

Saudi Arabia
First title
