= Boualem Mesmoudi =

Algerian footballer (born 1994)

Personal information
- Full name: Boualem Amine Mesmoudi
- Date of birth: 15 April 1994 (age 32)
- Place of birth: Oran, Algeria
- Height: 1.85 m (6 ft 1 in)
- Position: Defender

Youth career
- 2006–2007: Nasr Es Senia
- 2007–2013: MC Oran
- 2013–2014: ASM Oran

Senior career*
| Years | Team | Apps | (Gls) |
| 2014–2018 | ASM Oran | 61 | (7) |
| 2018–2019 | USM Bel Abbès | 22 | (2) |
| 2019–2021 | MC Oran | 36 | (6) |
| 2021–2022 | ES Sahel | 6 | (0) |
| 2022 | Al-Wakrah | 4 | (0) |
| 2022–2023 | MC Alger | 12 | (0) |
| 2024 | ES Ben Aknoun | 12 | (1) |
| 2024–2026 | ES Mostaganem | 37 | (1) |

International career^{‡}
| 2021– | Algeria A' | 2 | (0) |
- * Club domestic league appearances and goals as of 5 June 2026 ‡ National team caps and goals as of 9 October 2021

Boualem Amine Mesmoudi (Arabic: بوعلام مصمودي; born 15 April 1994) is an Algerian footballer.

== Career ==
In 2019, he signed a contract with MC Oran. In 2021, he signed a contract with ES Sahel. In 2022, he signed a contract with Al-Wakrah SC. On 2 July 2022, Mesmoudi Signed a two-years contract with MC Alger. In February 2024, he joined ES Ben Aknoun.In August 2024, he joined ES Mostaganem.

== Honours ==
=== Club ===
USM Bel Abbès

- Algerian Super Cup (1): 2018
