= 2007 WAFF U-15 Championship =

بطولة اتحاد غرب آسيا الثانية للناشئين

Tournament details
- Host country: Syria
- City: Aleppo
- Dates: 1–6 September
- Teams: 5 (from 1 sub-confederation)
- Venue: 1 (in 1 host city)

Final positions
- Champions: Syria (1st title)
- Runners-up: Iran
- Third place: Jordan
- Fourth place: Iraq

Tournament statistics
- Matches played: 10
- Goals scored: 44 (4.4 per match)

The 2007 WAFF U-15 Championship was the second edition of the WAFF U-15 Championship, the annual international youth football championship organised by the WAFF for the men's under-15 national teams of West Asia. It took place in Aleppo, Syria. Five teams entered the competition.

Iran were the defending champions. Players born on or after 1 January 1992 were eligible to compete.

== Tournament ==
Pos	Team	Pld	W	D	L	GF	GA	GD	Pts
1	Syria (C, H)	4	3	1	0	14	2	+12	10
2	Iran	4	2	1	1	18	8	+10	7
3	Jordan	4	1	2	1	3	8	−5	5
4	Iraq	4	1	1	2	7	6	+1	4
5	Lebanon	4	0	1	3	2	20	−18	1

Source: WAFF
(C) Champions; (H) Hosts
1 September 2007
17:00

Iraq	2–2	Iran

Al-Hamadaniah Stadium, Aleppo
1 September 2007
19:00

Jordan	2–2	Lebanon

Al-Hamadaniah Stadium, Aleppo

2 September 2007
17:00

Jordan	1–0	Iraq

Al-Hamadaniah Stadium, Aleppo
2 September 2007
19:00

Iran	2–6	Syria

Al-Hamadaniah Stadium, Aleppo

3 September 2007
17:00

Lebanon	0–5	Iraq

Al-Hamadaniah Stadium, Aleppo
3 September 2007
19:00

Syria	0–0	Jordan

Al-Hamadaniah Stadium, Aleppo

5 September 2007
17:00

Lebanon	0–8	Iran

Al-Hamadaniah Stadium, Aleppo
5 September 2007
19:00

Iraq	0–3	Syria

Al-Hamadaniah Stadium, Aleppo

6 September 2007
17:00

Iran	6–0	Jordan

Al-Hamadaniah Stadium, Aleppo
6 September 2007
19:00

Syria	5–0	Lebanon

Al-Hamadaniah Stadium, Aleppo
