= 2010–11 Damash Gilan F.C. season =

Damash Gilan
2009–10 season
- Chairman: (Iran) Amir Abedini
- Manager: (Iran) Mehdi Dinvarzadeh

This is a list of Damash Gilan's results in the 2010–11 season. The club was competing in the Azadegan League and Hazfi Cup.

== Players ==
=== Appearances and goals ===
Appearance and goalscoring records for all the players who are in the Damash Gilan first team squad during the 2010–11 season.
Last update May 12, 2011.

No.	Pos	Nat	Player	Total		Azadegan League		Hazfi Cup	
No.	Pos	Nat	Player	Apps	Goals	Apps	Goals	Apps	Goals
1	GK	(Iran) IRI	Ali Nazarmohammadi (1st vice-captain)	14	0	13	0	1	0
2	DF	(Iran) IRI	Ali Mohammad Dehghan	11	0	9	0	2	0
3	DF	(Iran) IRI	Ali Hosseini	22	0	20	0	2	0
5	MF	(Iran) IRI	Amir Saadati	2	0	2	0	0	0
6	DF	(Iran) IRI	Masoud Mikaeili	20	0	19	0	1	0
7	MF	(Iran) IRI	Hadi Sohrabi	16	1	14	1	2	0
8	DF	(Iran) IRI	Alireza Nazifkar	24	5	22	5	2	0
9	MF	(Iran) IRI	Amin Torkashvand	21	5	19	4	2	1
10	FW	(Iran) IRI	Afshin Chavoshi (2nd vice-captain)	21	16	18	13	3	3
11	MF	(Iran) IRI	Mohammad Reza Mahdavi (captain)	23	7	21	6	2	1
12	MF	(Iran) IRI	Mostafa Hajati	23	2	21	2	2	0
13	FW	(Iran) IRI	Mohammad Abshak	26	0	23	0	3	0
14	MF	(Iran) IRI	Mohammad Sadegh Taheri	12	0	12	0	0	0
15	MF	(Iran) IRI	Behnam Afsheh	24	3	21	1	3	2
16	DF	(Iran) IRI	Saeed Esmaeil Shirazi	3	0	3	0	0	0
17	DF	(Iran) IRI	Ebrahim Lovinian	15	0	13	0	2	0
20	DF	(Iran) IRI	Mohammad Mokhtari	5	1	3	0	2	1
21	DF	(Iran) IRI	Sepehr Mohammad Sadegh	7	0	7	0	0	0
22	MF	(Iran) IRI	Mehrzad Rezaei	25	0	22	0	3	0
23	FW	(Iran) IRI	Ali Amiri	15	4	13	2	2	2
24	FW	(Montenegro) MNE	Admir Adrović	12	3	9	1	3	2
26	MF	(Iran) IRI	MehrGan Golbarg	2	0	2	0	0	0
27	FW	(Iran) IRI	Reza Almaskhaneh	3	0	3	0	0	0
28	MF	(Armenia) ARM	Hamlet Mkhitaryan	23	2	19	1	4	1
30	GK	(Montenegro) MNE	Miloš Radanović	14	0	12	0	2	0
33	GK	(Iran) IRI	Behnam Laeghifar	1	0	1	0	0	0
	DF	(Iran) IRI	Iman Kollivand	1	0	1	0	0	0
	DF	(Iran) IRI	Iman Golalizadeh	1	0	1	0	0	0
	MF	(Iran) IRI	Milad Torabi	0	0	0	0	0	0
	FW	(Iran) IRI	Arman Dadashzade	1	0	0	0	1	0
		(Iran) IRI	Sadegh Pourmohammad	0	0	0	0	0	0
	DF	(Iran) IRI	Hossein Gohari	0	0	0	0	0	0
		(Iran) IRI	Mojtaba Farzam	0	0	0	0	0	0

== Match results ==
Win Tie Loss

=== Regular reason ===
September 23, 2010	Damash Gilan	1–1	Foolad Natanz	Rasht, Gilan, Iran
	Chavoshi 65'; Mokhtari (yellow card) 42'; Adrović (yellow card) 84'; Hosseini (yellow card) 86'		Shojaei 57'; Marzban (yellow card); Maheri (yellow card); Mahdavi (yellow card); Shojaei (yellow card)	Stadium: Sardar Jangal Stadium; Attendance: 1,000; Referee: Mansour Ashouri

October 07, 2010	Shahrdari Yasuj	0–0	Damash Gilan	Yasouj, Kohgilūyé o Boyer-Ahmad, Iran
	Abashk (yellow card); Hosseini (yellow card)		Hejazipour (yellow card); Nazifkar (red card)	Stadium: Tahkti Yasuj; Attendance: 500; Referee: Rahim Mehrpishe

October 29, 2010	Damash Gilan	1–1	Tarbiat Yazd	Rasht, Gilan, Iran
	Adrović 48'		Moghadasipour 70'	Stadium: Dr. Azodi Stadium; Attendance: 1,000

November 04, 2010	Mes Rafsanjan	2–0	Damash Gilan	Rafsanjan, Kerman, Iran
	Mehdizadeh 23'; Mohammadi 68'; Mehdizadeh (yellow card)		Saadati (yellow card)	Stadium: Shohadaye Noushabad; Attendance: 1,000; Referee: Ghasem Vahedi

November 12, 2010	Damash Gilan	1–0	Etka Gorgan	Rasht, Gilan, Iran
	Amiri 57'; Hajati (yellow card); Abashk (yellow card); Amiri (yellow card); Mkhitaryan (yellow card)		Vazaei (yellow card); Geravand (yellow card); Mohammadpour (red card) 85'	Stadium: Dr. Azodi Stadium; Attendance: 2,000; Referee: Mohammadreza Akbarian

November 19, 2010	Kaveh Tehran	Postponed	Damash Gilan	Tehran, Iran

November 26, 2010	Damash Gilan	2–0	Hamyari Arak	Rasht, Gilan, Iran
	Sohrabi 30'; Afsheh 87'			Stadium: Dr. Azodi Stadium; Attendance: 3,000

December 3, 2010	Payam Mashhad	1–0	Damash Gilan	Mashhad, Khorasan, Iran
	Zahmatkesh 53'			Stadium: Takhti Mashhad; Attendance: 2,000; Referee: Asadi

December 10, 2010	Damash Gilan	1–1	Mashin Sazi	Rasht, Gilan, Iran
	Mahdavi 84'		Faramarzi 40'	Stadium: Dr. Azodi Stadium; Attendance: 1,000; Referee: Afshar

December 19, 2010	Kaveh Tehran	1–1	Damash Gilan	Tehran, Iran
	Shahrouz Ghavimazhab 80'		Alireza Nazifkar 62'	Stadium: Qods Stadium; Attendance: 100; Referee: Salehi

December 25, 2010	Naft M.S.	2–2	Damash Gilan	Masjed Soleyman, Khouzestan, Iran
	Khademi 9'; Nesari 90+2'		Nazifkar 32' 74'	Stadium: Shahid Behnam Mohammadi; Attendance: 20,000; Referee: Mehrpisheh

December 31, 2010	Damash Gilan	2–1	Gol Gohar	Rasht, Gilan, Iran
	Nazifkar 56'; Torkashvand (yellow card) 63'		Fathi 45'	Stadium: Dr. Azodi Stadium; Attendance: 1,000; Referee: Rasoul Rahbarfam

January 7, 2011	Damash Gilan	1–0	Shahrdari F.C.	Rasht, Gilan, Iran
	Chavoshi 46'			Stadium: Dr. Azodi Stadium; Attendance: 2,000; Referee: Akbarian

January 13, 2011	Moghavemat Sepasi	0–1	Damash Gilan	Shiraz, Fars, Iran
			Mahdavi 78'	Stadium: Hafezieh Stadium; Attendance: 4,000; Referee: Janbazi

January 28, 2011	Foolad Natanz	1–1	Damash Gilan	Natanz, Isfahan, Iran
	Torkashvand 6'		Shojaei 28'	Stadium: Shahid Manouchehri; Attendance: 1,000; Referee: Moyood Bonyadifard

February 07, 2011	Damash Gilan	4–3	Shahrdari Yasuj	Rasht, Gilan, Iran
	Torkashvand 19'; Chavoshi 32' 63' 73'		Akbari 13'; Berosh 37'; Haghshenas 88'	Stadium: Dr. Azodi Stadium; Attendance: 3,000; Referee: Ali Sadighi

February 13, 2011	Tarbiat Yazd	0–0	Damash Gilan	Yazd, Yazd province, Iran
				Stadium: Nassiri Stadium; Attendance: 0 Referee: Hossein Zargar

February 18, 2011	Damash Gilan	4–1	Mes Rafsanjan	Rasht, Gilan, Iran
	Mahdavi 9' 12'; Chavoshi 42'; Amiri 60'		Jamali 80'	Stadium: Dr. Azodi Stadium; Attendance: 3,000; Referee: Shahin Shahbabaei

February 25, 2011	Etka Golestan	1–0	Damash Gilan	Gorgan, Golestan, Iran
	Yanpi 83'			Stadium: Karim Abad Stadium; Attendance: 1,500; Referee: Mohammad Maleki

March 4, 2011	Damash Gilan	3–1	Kaveh Tehran	Rasht, Gilan, Iran
	Hajati 63'; Chavoshi 67'; Mahdavi 85'		Ebrahimi 41'	Stadium: Dr. Azodi Stadium; Attendance: 3,000; Referee: Mansour Nouri

March 11, 2011	Hamyari Arak	1–2	Damash Gilan	Arak, Markazi, Iran
	Jaffari 30'		Chavoshi 46'; Nazifkar 78'	Stadium: Imam Khomeini Stadium; Attendance: 1,500; Referee: Gholamreza Jabbari

March 18, 2011	Damash Gilan	3–0	Payam Mashhad	Rasht, Gilan, Iran
		technical lose of 3–0		Stadium: Dr. Azodi Stadium

April 8, 2011	Mashin Sazi	2–3	Damash Gilan	Tabriz, East Azarbaijan, Iran
	Pasi 14', 92'		Mahdavi 72'; Chavoshi 74'; Turkashvand 89'	Stadium: Yadegare Imam Stadium; Attendance: 1,0000; Referee: Ashkan Khorshidi

April 14, 2011	Damash Gilan	3–1	Naft M.S.	Rasht, Gilan, Iran
				Stadium: Dr. Azodi Stadium

=== Hazfi Cup ===
September 30, 2010	Damash Gilan	4–0	Milad Dezful F.C.	Rasht, Gilan, Iran
	Chavoshi 8'; Amiri 23' 45'; Afsheh 47'			Stadium: Sardar Jangal Stadium; Attendance: 100; Referee: Toraj Haghveridi

October 12, 2010	Shahrdari Ashkezar F.C.	1–6	Damash Gilan	Ashkezar, Yazd, Iran
			Chavoshi; Adrović; Torkashvand; Mokhtari; Mkhitaryan

October 20, 2010	Damash Gilan	3–1	Saipa F.C.	Rasht, Gilan, Iran
	Chavoshi 14'; Mahdavi 18'; Afsheh 65'; Abashk (yellow card)		Ebrahim Sadeghi 39'; Hosseini (yellow card)	Stadium: Sardar Jangal Stadium; Attendance: 500; Referee: Shahin Hajbabaei

November 21, 2010	Damash Gilan	1–2	Persepolis F.C.	Rasht, Gilan, Iran
	Adrović 12'; Sohrabi (yellow card); Torkashvand (yellow card); Nazifkar (yellow card); Hajati (red card)		Heidari 33'; Hallafi 104'; Mohammad (yellow card); Shiri (yellow card); Tiago (yellow card)	Stadium: Sardar Jangal Stadium; Attendance: 20,000

== Goal scorers ==
Scorer	League	Hazfi Cup	Total
(Iran) Afshin Chavoshi	13	3	16
(Iran) Mohammad Reza Mahdavi	6	1	7
(Iran) Alireza Nazifkar	5	0	5
(Iran) Amin Torkashvand	4	1	5
(Iran) Ali Amiri	2	2	4
(Iran) Mostafa Hajati	2	0	2
(Montenegro) Admir Adrović	1	3	4
(Iran) Behnam Afsheh	1	2	3
(Armenia) Hamlet Mkhitaryan	1	1	1
(Iran) Hadi Sohrabi	1	0	1
(Iran) Mohammad Mokhtari	0	1	1
Total goals scored	36	12	48

== Squad changes during 2010/11 season ==
=== In ===
No.	Position	Player	Moving from	League	Transfer window
8	DF	(Iran) Alireza Nazifkar	(Iran) Nassaji Mazandaran	(Iran) Azadegan League	Summer
	MF	(Iran) Milad Torabi	(Iran) Damash Lorestan	(Iran) Azadegan League	Summer
24	FW	(Montenegro) Admir Adrović	(Montenegro) FK Sutjeska Nikšić	(Montenegro) First League	Summer
3	DF	(Iran) Ali Hosseini	(Iran) Saipa	Iran Pro League	Summer
17	DF	(Iran) Ebrahim Lovinian	(Iran) Aboomoslem	(Iran) Azadegan League	Summer
2	DF	(Iran) Ali Mohamad Dehghan	(Iran) Moghavemat Sepasi	(Iran) Azadegan League	Summer
11	MF	(Iran) Mohammad Reza Mahdavi	(Iran) Steel Azin	Iran Pro League	Summer
10	FW	(Iran) Afshin Chavoshi	(Iran) Steel Azin	Iran Pro League	Summer
30	GK	(Montenegro) Miloš Radanović	(Montenegro) FK Rudar Pljevlja	(Montenegro) First League	Summer
1	GK	(Iran) Ali Nazarmohammadi	(Iran) Steel Azin	Iran Pro League	Summer
15	MF	(Iran) Behnam Afsheh	(Iran) Moghavemat Sepasi	(Iran) Azadegan League	Summer
	DF	(Iran) Iman Golalizadeh	(Iran) Shirin Faraz	(Iran) Azadegan League	Summer
	FW	(Iran) Arman Dadashzadeh	Youth Team		Summer
26	MF	(Iran) Mehrgan Golbarg	Youth Team		Summer
		(Iran) Sadegh Pourmohammad	Youth Team		Summer
	DF	(Iran) Hossein Gohari	Youth Team		Summer
		(Iran) Mojtaba Farzam	Youth Team		Summer
14	MF	(Iran) Mohammad Sadegh Taheri	(Iran) Tractor	Iran Pro League	Fall
21	DF	(Iran) Sepehr Mohammad Sadegh	(Iran) Naft Tehran	Iran Pro League	Fall
16	DF	(Iran) Saeed Esmaeil Shirazi	(Iran) Naft Tehran	Iran Pro League	Fall

=== Out ===
No.	Position	Player	Moving to	League	Transfer window
9	MF	(Iran) Hossein Maleki	(Iran) Chooka	(Iran) 2nd Division	Summer
11	FW	(Iran) Reza Taheri	(Iran) Moghavemat Sepasi	(Iran) Azadegan League	Summer
40	GK	(Croatia) Tomislav Vranjić	Free agent		Summer
22	MF	(Iran) Shahin Shafie	(Iran) Gostaresh Foolad	(Iran) Azadegan League	Summer
1	GK	(Iran) Mohsen Forouzanfar	(Iran) Gostaresh Foolad	(Iran) Azadegan League	Summer
21	DF	(Iran) Mohammad Siah	Free agent		Summer
4	MF	(Iran) Amir Azhari	(Iran) Hamyari Arak	(Iran) Azadegan League	Summer
3	DF	(Iran) Taghi Ghasemzadeh	(Iran) Tarbiat Yazd	(Iran) Azadegan League	Summer
26	FW	(Iran) Hamed Abedi	Free agent		Summer
	DF	(Iran) Milad Shadmand	Free agent		Summer
	FW	(Iran) Mehdi Aghazadeh	Free agent		Summer
	FW	(Iran) Hamed Kianirad	(Iran) Tarbiat Yazd	(Iran) Azadegan League	Summer
14	FW	(Iran) Habib Shakeri	(Iran) Tarbiat Yazd	(Iran) Azadegan League	Summer
	GK	(Iran) Hamed Tabatabaei	(Iran) Payam Mashhad	(Iran) Azadegan League	Summer
6	MF	(Iran) Mostafa Haghipour	(Iran) Tractor Sazi	Iran Pro League	Summer
2	DF	(Iran) Siamak Farahani	Free agent		Summer
5	DF	(Iran) Reza Aghamohammadi	Free agent		Summer
7	FW	(Iran) Mohsen Rasouli	Free agent		Summer
17	MF	(Iran) Masoud Abtahi	Free agent		Summer
19	MF	(Iran) Ali Ghasemian	Free agent		Summer
5	DF	(Iran) Amir Saadati	Free agent		Fall
