= 2004–05 Persepolis F.C. season =

Persepolis
2004–05 season
- Chairman: Hojatollah Khatib
- Manager: Rainer Zobel
- Stadium: Azadi Stadium
- Iran Pro League: 4th
- Hazfi Cup: Round of 16
- Top goalscorer: League: Javad Kazemian (9 goals); All: Javad Kazemian (9 goals)
- Highest home attendance: 75,000 (22 October 2004 against Esteghlal)
- Lowest home attendance: 8,000 (19 December 2003 against Saipa; 10 April 2005 against Saba Battery)
- Average home league attendance: 23,733
Home colours	Away colours

The 2004–05 season was the Persepolis's 4th season in the Persian Gulf Cup, and their 22nd consecutive season in the top division of Iranian Football. They also competed in the Hazfi Cup. Persepolis was captained by Behrouz Rahbarifar.

== Squad ==
As of October 2004. Note: Flags indicate national team as defined under FIFA eligibility rules; some limited exceptions apply. Players may hold more than one non-FIFA nationality.

No.	Pos.	Nation	Player
1	GK	IRI	Davoud Fanaei
2	DF	MKD	Ilče Pereski
3	DF	IRI	Hassan Khanmohammadi
4	DF	IRI	Yahya Golmohammadi (vice-captain)
5	DF	IRI	Mohammad Reza Mahdavi
6	MF	IRI	Karim Bagheri (3rd captain)
8	DF	IRI	Ali Ansarian
9	FW	IRI	Javad Kazemian
10	MF	IRI	Hamed Kavianpour
11	DF	IRI	Pejman Jamshidi
12	MF	IRI	Aref Mohammadvand
13	DF	IRI	Sheys Rezaei
14	MF	IRI	Reza Jabbari
15	MF	IRI	Mohammad Reza Mamani

No.	Pos.	Nation	Player
16	FW	IRI	Ali Salmani
17	FW	IRI	Sohrab Entezari
18	FW	NGR	Sambo Choji
19	FW	IRI	Meghdad Ghobakhlou
20	DF	IRI	Behrouz Rahbarifar (captain)
21	MF	IRI	Ebrahim Asadi
22	GK	IRI	Mohammad Mohammadi
23	DF	IRI	Alireza Emamifar
24	FW	IRI	Mehdi Salehpour
25	MF	IRI	Ardalan Ashtiani
26	MF	IRI	Meisam Rezapour
30	GK	IRI	Farshid Karimi
33	FW	IRI	Mehrdad Oladi
88	GK	MKD	Jane Nikolovski

== Transfers ==
=== In ===
No	P	Name	Age	Moving from	Transfer fee	Type	Transfer window	Source
20	CB	Behrouz Rahbarifar	33	Pas	–	Free Transfer	Summer	
8	CB	Ali Ansarian	26	Saipa	–	Free Transfer	Summer	
2	CB	(North Macedonia) Ilče Pereski	28	(North Macedonia) Karaorman	–	Free Transfer	Summer	
18	CF	(Nigeria) Sambo Choji	26	(Germany) Saarbrücken	–	Free Transfer	Summer	
5	CB	Mohammad Reza Mahdavi	32	Sepahan	–	Free Transfer	Summer	
26	LW	Meisam Rezapour	22	Azarbayejan	–	Free Transfer	Summer	
24	CF	Mehdi Salehpour	30	Azarbayejan	–	Free Transfer	Summer	
1	GK	Davoud Fanaei	29	Azarbayejan	–	Free Transfer	Summer	
25	RB	Ardalan Ashtiani	22	Persepolis Academy	–	Promoted	Summer	
15	DM	Mohammad Reza Mamani	22	Persepolis Academy	–	Promoted	Summer	
	GK	(North Macedonia) Jane Nikolovski	32	(North Macedonia) Napredok	–	Free Transfer	Winter	

=== Out ===
No	P	Name	Age	Moving to	Transfer fee	Type	Transfer window	Source
20	CB	Younes Bahonar	27	Tractor Sazi	–	Free Transfer	Summer	
25	CM	Hamid Estili	38	Retired			Summer	
13	CF	(Mali) Issa Traoré	25	Pas	–	Free Transfer	Summer	
15	CB	Mojtaba Shiri	25	Esteghlal Ahvaz	–	Free Transfer	Summer	
5	CB	Afshin Peyrovani	34	Paykan	–	Free Transfer	Summer	
10	CF	Ali Daei	34	Saba Battery	–	Free Transfer	Summer	
11	LW	Mehdi Tartar	29	Sepahan	–	Free Transfer	Summer	
	LB	Ali Nikhou	27	Sepahan	–	Free Transfer	Summer	
2	LB	Mohammad Barzegar	28	Sanat Naft	–	Free Transfer	Summer	
1	GK	(North Macedonia) Saša Ilić	34	Esteghlal Ahvaz	–	Free Transfer	Summer	
	RW	Behnam Afsheh	21	Released		Contract termination	Summer	

== Technical staff ==
Position	Staff
Head coach	(Germany) Rainer Zobel
Assistant coach	(Iran) Hamid Estili
Goalkeeping coach	(Iran) Vahid Ghelich
Physical fitness trainer	(Iran) Parviz Komasi
Doctor	(Iran) Dr Farid Zarineh
Technical manager	(Iran) Ali Parvin
Team manager	(Iran) Mahmoud Khordbin

== Competition record ==
Competition	Record							
Competition	G	W	D	L	GF	GA	GD	Win %
Iran Pro League	30	16	7	7	42	28	+14	53.33
Hazfi Cup	4	1	0	3	7	7	+0	25.00
Total	30	11	9	10	49	35	+14	36.67

=== Iran Pro League ===
==== Standings ====
Pos	Team	Pld	W	D	L	GF	GA	GD	Pts
2	Zob Ahan	30	17	7	6	38	19	+19	58
3	Esteghlal	30	16	10	4	51	35	+16	58
4	Persepolis	30	16	7	7	43	27	+16	55
5	Est. Ahvaz	30	12	8	10	41	34	+7	44
6	Pas	30	11	9	10	49	40	+9	42

Updated to match(es) played on 1 September 2018. Source: IPL Stats, Soccerway
Rules for classification: 1) Points; 2) Goal difference; 3) Goals scored.

== Competitions ==
=== Iran Pro League ===
Win Draw Loss Postponed

Date Round	Home	Score	Away	Location

14 September 2004 1	Foolad	3 – 1	Persepolis	Ahvaz
	I. Mobali 6'; A. Momenzadeh 38'; M. Soleymani (yellow card) 63'; A. Badavi (yellow card) 75'; A. Hajipour (yellow card) 86'; L. Hamidi 90+3' (yellow card) 90+3'	Stats	M. Mohammadi (yellow card) 17'; J. Kazemian 65'; R. Jabari (yellow card) 77'; Y. Golmohammadi (yellow card) 80'; K. Bagheri (yellow card) 90+2'	Stadium: Takhti Stadium; Man of the Match: 15,000

19 September 2004 2	Persepolis	1 – 1	Bargh Shiraz	Tehran
	K. Bagheri 15'; I. Pereski (yellow card) 33'; P. Jamshidi (yellow card) 55'	Stats	B. Pakniat 82'; M. Haj Osbouei (yellow card) 90'	Stadium: Azadi Stadium; Attendance: 40,000

24 September 2004 3	Paykan	0 – 1	Persepolis	Tehran
	M. Khoramzi (yellow card) 40'	Stats	S. Entezari 28' (yellow card) 85'; B. Rahbarifar (yellow card) 56'; E. Asadi (yellow card) 65'; M. Mahdavi (yellow card) 88'	Stadium: Azadi Stadium; Attendance: 35,000

1 October 2004 4	Persepolis	1 – 2	Malavan	Tehran
	I. Pereski (yellow card) 15'; S. Choji 18'; E. Asadi (yellow card) 62'	Stats	M. Giahi (yellow card) 46'; B. Rahbarifar 51' (o.g.); M. Ghorbani 65'; M. Falahatchi (yellow card) 90+2'	Stadium: Azadi Stadium; Attendance: 25,000

17 October 2004 5	Shamoushak	0 – 1	Persepolis	Noshahr
	R. Moslemzadeh (yellow card) 30'	Stats	A. Ansarian (yellow card) 28'; M. Oladi 87'	Attendance: 10,000

22 October 2004 6	Persepolis	0 – 0	Esteghlal	Tehran
	P. Jamshidi (yellow card) 39'; Y. Golmohammadi (yellow card) 81'	Stats	R. Enayati (yellow card) 45'; A. Mansourian (yellow card) 54'	Stadium: Azadi Stadium; Attendance: 75,000; Referee: (Germany) Florian Meyer

29 October 2004 7	Sepahan	0 – 0	Persepolis	Isfahan
	S. Bayat (yellow card) 57'; M. Khademi (yellow card) 90+3'	Stats	B. Rahbarifar (yellow card) 18'; Y. Golmohammadi (yellow card) 28'; E. Asadi (yellow card) 59'; P. Jamshidi (yellow card) 69'	Stadium: Naghsh-e-Jahan Stadium; Attendance: 25,000

11 November 2004 8	Persepolis	2 – 0	Esteghlal Ahvaz	Tehran
	R. Jabbari 10'; J. Kazemian 55' (yellow card) 55'; M. Rezapour (yellow card) 63'; A. Salmani (yellow card) 66'	Stats	A. Abu Al-Hail (yellow card) 37'	Stadium: Azadi Stadium; Attendance: 10,000

19 November 2004 9	Saba Battery	0 – 0	Persepolis	Tehran
	S. Adu Tutu (yellow card) 25' (yellow-red card) 41'; A. Sakhvadze (yellow card) 60'; A. Ghasemian (yellow card) 67'	Stats	A. Ansarian (yellow card) 48'	Stadium: Azadi Stadium; Attendance: 35,000

26 November 2004 10	Persepolis	5 – 1	Fajr Sepasi	Tehran
	A. Salmani (yellow card) 28'; M. Oladi (yellow card) 34' (goal) 65'; M. Rezapour (yellow card) 42'; A. Ansarian 56', 80' (yellow card) 45' (yellow-red card) 92'; J. Kazemian 62'; R. Jabari 86'; P. Jamshidi (yellow card) 90'	Stats	H. Faraji (yellow card) 41'; F. Tabatabaeifar (yellow card) 71'; F. Talebi 75'; M. Mohammadi (yellow card) 88'	Stadium: Azadi Stadium; Attendance: 20,000

10 December 2004 12	Persepolis	2 – 1	Pas	Tehran
	M. Oladi 34'; J. Kazemian 43' (yellow card) 23' (yellow-red card) 45'; M. Mahdavi (yellow card) 56'	Stats	I. Razaghirad 2'; M. Nosrati (yellow card) 47'; M. Maniei (yellow card) 65'; J. Nekounam (penalty missed) 67'; M. Bayatinia (yellow card) 83'; A. Borhani (yellow card) 90'	Stadium: Azadi Stadium; Attendance: 35,000

14 December 2004 11	Pegah	0 – 1	Persepolis	Rasht
	R. Mir Toroghi (yellow card) 90'	Stats	S. Entezari 26'; A. Emamifar (yellow card) 44'; P. Jamshidi (yellow card) 82'; E. Asadi (yellow card) 89'	Stadium: Dr. Azodi Stadium; Attendance: 25,000

19 December 2004 13	Persepolis	1 – 0	Saipa	Tehran
	B. Rahbarifar (yellow card) 65' (red card) 77'; A. Emamifar 85'	Stats	R. Samieinia (yellow card) 8'; M. Izadi (yellow card) 67'; E. Sadeghi (yellow card) 77'	Stadium: Azadi Stadium; Attendance: 8,000

24 December 2004 14	Aboumoslem	1 – 0	Persepolis	Mashhad
	F. Fazli 65' (yellow card) 65'; A. Bagheri (yellow card) 86'	Stats	A. Emamifar (yellow card) 40'; K. Bagheri (yellow card) 44'; P. Jamshidi (yellow card) 86'	Stadium: Takhti Stadium; Attendance: 35,000

30 December 2004 15	Persepolis	1 – 0	Zob Ahan	Tehran
	S. Entezari 90'	Stats	M. Hosseini (yellow card) 84'	Stadium: Azadi Stadium; Attendance: 15,000

9 January 2005 16	Persepolis	0 – 2	Foolad	Tehran
	B. Rahbarifar (yellow card) 15'; A. Ansarian (yellow card) 46'; J. Kazemian (yellow card) 60'	Stats	M. Soleymani 46'; I. Mobali 47'; R. Mardani (yellow card) 64'; A. Badavi (yellow card) 67'; M. Nouri (yellow card) 90+3'	Stadium: Azadi Stadium; Attendance: 30,000

14 January 2005 17	Bargh Shiraz	1 – 2	Persepolis	Shiraz
	F. Abedi 24'; M. Eyni (yellow card) 40'; S. Zare (yellow card) 44'; H. Abedinejad (yellow card) 61'	Stats	K. Bagheri (yellow card) 45'; J. Kazemian 45'; M. Mahdavi 46'; B. Rahbarifar (yellow card) 58'; M. Oladi (yellow card) 65'	Stadium: Hafezieh Stadium; Attendance: 30,000

20 January 2005 18	Persepolis	2 – 1	Paykan	Tehran
	M. Oladi 11'; Y. Golmohammadi (yellow card) 28'; J. Kazemian 33' (yellow card) 86'; M. Mahdavi (yellow card) 35'; B. Rahbarifar (yellow card) 78'	Stats	M. Sar Asiabi (yellow card) 1'; B. Tahmasebi 23'	Stadium: Azadi Stadium; Attendance: 25,000

16 February 2005 20	Persepolis	2 – 1	Shamoushak	Tehran
	M. Oladi 45'; I. Pereski (yellow card) 57'; P. Jamshidi 58'	Stats	E. Mohseni (yellow card) 70'; M. Jabarpour 83'	Stadium: Azadi Stadium; Attendance: 10,000

25 February 2005 21	Esteghlal	3 – 2	Persepolis	Tehran
	A. Gilauri (yellow card) 14'; M. Fekri (yellow card) 38' (goal) 84'; R. Enayati 68'; A. Mansourian (yellow card) 81'; P. Ghorbani 90+2'	Stats	Sh. Rezaei 74'; S. Entezari 77' (yellow card) 77'; B. Rahbarifar (yellow card) 84'	Stadium: Azadi Stadium; Attendance: 80,000; Referee: (Russia) Valentin Ivanov

1 March 2005 19	Malavan	1 – 2	Persepolis	Anzali
	A. Ghorbani 78'; H. Ashjari (yellow card) 90+2'	Stats	A. Emamifar (yellow card) 23'; K. Bagheri 54'; Sh. Rezaei (yellow card) 78'; M. Oladi 85'	Stadium: Takhti Stadium; Attendance: 20,000

10 March 2005 23	Esteghlal Ahvaz	1 – 1	Persepolis	Ahvaz
	E. Taghipour (yellow card) 42'; H. Zadmahmoud 58'; H. Farzaneh (yellow card) 81'; A. Abu Al-Hail (yellow card) 89'	Stats	M. Mahdavi (yellow card) 17'; E. Asadi (yellow card) 50'; A. Salmani (yellow card) 75'; M. Salehpour 86'	Stadium: Takhti Stadium; Attendance: 30,000

10 April 2005 24	Persepolis	1 – 0	Saba Battery	Tehran
	A, Ansarian 34'; I. Pereski (yellow card) 88'; R. Jabari (yellow card) 90+2'	Stats	M. Soltani (yellow card) 35'; S. Beygi (yellow card) 42'	Stadium: Azadi Stadium; Attendance: 8,000

15 April 2005 25	Fajr Sepasi	0 – 0	Persepolis	Shiraz
	M. Neysani (yellow card) 7'; V. Moradi (yellow card) 58'; V. Rezaei (yellow card) 68'; M. Madanchi (yellow card) 90+1'	Stats	P. Jamshidi (yellow card) 21'; J. Kazemian (yellow card) 73'; A. Ansarian (yellow card) 80'	Stadium: Hafezieh Stadium; Attendance: 20,000

24 April 2005 26	Persepolis	6 – 0	Pegah	Tehran
	E. Asadi 20'; R. Jabari 42'; S. Entezari 44'; A. Emamifar 58'; J. Kazemian 61'; I. Pereski (yellow card) 73' (yellow-red card) 90'; M. Oladi 81'	Stats		Stadium: Azadi Stadium; Attendance: 10,000

29 April 2005 27	Pas	1 – 1	Persepolis	Tehran
	M. Bayatinia 4' (yellow card) 4'; H. Rajabi (yellow card) 57'; J. Nekounam (yellow card) 73'; A. Kazem (yellow card) 90+3'	Stats	A. Ansarian 11'; E. Asadi (yellow card) 38'; A. Emamifar (yellow card) 57'; Y. Golmohammadi (yellow card) 74'; M. Mahdavi (yellow card) 88'	Stadium: Azadi Stadium; Attendance: 70,000

6 May 2005 28	Saipa	0 – 1	Persepolis	Tehran
	M. Arzani (yellow card) 22'; M. Hasheminasab (yellow card) 64'	Stats	R. Jabari (yellow card) 67'; K. Bagheri (yellow card) 69'; M. Oladi 90+1' (yellow card) 90+2'	Stadium: Azadi Stadium; Attendance: 40,000

15 May 2005 22	Persepolis	1 – 2	Sepahan	Tehran
	J. Kazemian 17'	Stats	R. Khatibi 75', 85'	Stadium: Azadi Stadium; Attendance: 35,000

11 June 2005 29	Persepolis	3 – 2	Aboumoslem	Tehran
	S. Entezari 24', 34'; E. Asadi 62'; K. Bagheri (yellow card) 66'; A. Ansarian (yellow card) 89'	Stats	M. Kheiri 19'; A. Pourmand (yellow card) 59'; M. Jabari 77'	Stadium: Azadi Stadium; Attendance: 10,000

20 June 2005 30	Zob Ahan	3 – 2	Persepolis	Fooladshahr
	M. Salehinejad (yellow card) 17'; M. Rajabzadeh 38'; K. Sajedi (yellow card) 44'; I. Heydari (yellow card) 86' (goal) 90+3'; J. Rodriguez 89'	Stats	B. Rahbarifar (yellow card) 4'; M. Oladi (yellow card) 11'; I. Pereski (yellow card) 50'; S. Entezari (yellow card) 55' (goal) 80'; J. Kazemian 90'	Stadium: Fooladshahr Stadium; Attendance: 15,000

==== Score overview ====
Win Draw Loss

Opposition	Home score	Away score	Aggregate score
Aboomoslem	3–2	1–0	3–3
Bargh Shiraz	1–1	1–2	3–2
Esteghlal	0–0	3–2	2–3
Esteghlal Ahvaz	2–0	1–1	3–1
Fajr Sepasi	5–1	0–0	5–1
Foolad	0–2	3–1	1–5
Malavan	1–2	1–2	3–3
PAS	2–1	1–1	3–2
Paykan	2–1	0–1	3–1
Pegah	6–0	0–1	7–0
Saba Battery	1–0	0–0	1–0
Saipa	1–0	0–1	2–0
Sepahan	1–2	0–0	1–2
Shamoushak	2–1	0–1	3–1
Zob Ahan	1–0	3–2	3–3

=== Hazfi Cup ===
Win Draw Loss Postponed

Date Round	Home	Score	Away	Location

15 March 2005 Round of 32	Persepolis	1 – 0	Fajr Sepah Tehran	Tehran
	Y. Golmohammadi 38'			Stadium: Azadi Stadium; Referee: Mahmoud Rafiei

26 June 2005 Round of 16	Persepolis	0 – 1	Aboumoslem	Tehran
	Y. Golmohammadi (red card) 90+2'		M. Jabbari	Stadium: Azadi Stadium; Referee: Masoud Moradi

== Scorers ==
No.	Pos	Nat	Name	Pro League	Hazfi Cup	Total
9	RW	(Iran)	Javad Kazemian	9	0	9
17	CF	(Iran)	Sohrab Entezari	8	0	8
33	SS	(Iran)	Mehrdad Oladi	8	0	8
8	CB	(Iran)	Ali Ansarian	4	0	4
14	AM	(Iran)	Reza Jabbari	3	0	3
6	DM	(Iran)	Karim Bagheri	2	0	2
21	DM	(Iran)	Ebrahim Asadi	2	0	2
23	LB	(Iran)	Alireza Emamifar	2	0	2
5	CB	(Iran)	Mohammad Reza Mahdavi	1	0	1
?	FW	(Iran)	Mehdi Salehpour	1	0	1
18	ST	(Nigeria)	Sambo Choji	1	0	1
11	MF	(Iran)	Pejman Jamshidi	1	0	1
13	CB	(Iran)	Sheys Rezaei	1	0	1
4	CB	(Iran)	Yahya Golmohammadi	0	1	1
Totals				43	1	44

=== Goalkeeping ===
			League			Hazfi			Total		
No	N	Name	M	GA	CS	M	GA	CS	M	GA	CS
22	(Iran)	Mohammad Mohammadi	28	26	12	2	1	1	30	27	13
30	(Iran)	Farshid Karimi	2	1	1	–	–	–	2	1	1
Total			30	27	13	2	1	1	32	28	14
Last updated: 31 August 2020

== See also ==
- 2004–05 Iran Pro League
- 2004–05 Hazfi Cup
