= 2009–10 Damash Gilan F.C. season =

Damash Gilan
2008–09 season
- Chairman: Amir Abedini
- Manager: Markar Aghajanian; Firouz Karimi (until week 24)
- Azadegan League: 2nd
- Hazfi Cup: 1/8 Final
- Top goalscorer: League: Ali Amiri (10); All: Ali Amiri (11)

This is a list of Damash Gilan's results for the 2009–10 season. The club is competing in the Azadegan League and Hazfi Cup. By the end of the season Damash finish second on the league and was qualified for the promotion playoffs but they were eliminated in the playoff game against Sanat Naft and missed out on promotion

== 2009-2010 Squad ==
=== First-team squad ===
Note: Flags indicate national team as defined under FIFA eligibility rules; some limited exceptions apply. Players may hold more than one non-FIFA nationality.

No.	Pos.	Nation	Player
1	GK	IRN	Mohsen Forouzan
2	DF	IRN	Siamak Farahani
3	DF	IRN	Taghi Ghasemzade
4	MF	IRN	Amir Azhari
5	DF	IRN	Reza Aghamohammadi
6	MF	IRN	Mostafa Haghipour
7	FW	IRN	Mohsen Rasouli
8	MF	IRN	Mehrzad Rezaei
9	MF	IRN	Hossein Maleki
10	MF	IRN	Amin Torkashvand
11	FW	IRN	Reza Taheri
12	MF	IRN	Mostafa Hajati (captain)
13	FW	IRN	Mohammad Abshak
14	MF	IRN	Habib Shaker
16	DF	IRN	Masoud Mikaeli
17	MF	IRN	Masoud Abtahi
19	MF	IRN	Ali Ghasemian

No.	Pos.	Nation	Player
20	DF	IRN	Mohammad Mokhtari (vice-captain)
21	DF	IRN	Mohammad Siah
22	MF	IRN	Shahin Shafie
23	MF	IRN	Ali Amiri
25	MF	IRN	Hadi Sohrabi
26	FW	IRN	Hamed Abedi
27	FW	IRN	Reza Almaskhaneh
28	MF	ARM	Hamlet Mkhitaryan
33	GK	IRN	Behnam Laeghifar
40	GK	CRO	Tomislav Vranjić
--	MF	IRN	Hamed Hajati
--	DF	IRN	Milad Shadmand
--	FW	IRN	Mehdi Aghazadeh
--	DF	IRQ	Ahmad Wale Zeyad *
--	GK	BRA	Edgar Gomez Rodriguez *
--	FW	BRA	Philip Barbosa *
--	FW	IRN	Yunes Graeili *

- Notes

These players didn't finish the season with Damash Gilan

== Squad statistics ==
No.	Pos.	Name	League		Hazfi Cup		Total	
No.	Pos.	Name	Apps	Goals	Apps	Goals	Apps	Goals
1	GK	(Iran) Mohsen Forouzan	16	0	3	0	19	0
2	DF	(Iran) Siamak Farahani	0	0	0	0	0	0
3	DF	(Iran) Taghi Ghasemzade	10	0	1	0	11	0
4	MF	(Iran) Amir Azhari	14	0	2	0	16	0
5	DF	(Iran) Reza Aghamohammadi	10	0	2	0	12	0
6	MF	(Iran) Mostafa Haghipour	22	0	2	0	24	0
7	FW	(Iran) Mohsen Rasouli	4	0	0	0	4	0
8	MF	(Iran) Mehrzad Rezaei	21	0	1	0	22	0
9	MF	(Iran) Hossein Maleki	3	0	1	0	4	0
10	MF	(Iran) Amin Torkashvand	19	5	1	0	20	5
11	FW	(Iran) Reza Taheri	24	9	3	1	27	10
12	MF	(Iran) Mostafa Hajati	12	3	3	0	15	3
13	FW	(Iran) Mohammad Abshak	21	1	3	0	24	1
14	MF	(Iran) Habib Shakeri	6	0	1	0	7	0
16	DF	(Iran) Masoud Mikaeli	26	0	3	0	29	0
17	DF	(Iran) Masoud Abtahi	7	2	1	1	8	3
19	MF	(Iran) Ali Ghasemian	12	0	1	0	13	0
20	DF	(Iran) Mohammad Mokhtari	19	1	3	0	22	1
21	DF	(Iran) Mohammad Siah	11	0	1	0	12	0
22	MF	(Iran) Shahin Shafie	22	5	2	1	24	6
23	MF	(Iran) Ali Amiri	23	10	2	1	25	11
25	MF	(Iran) Hadi Sohrabi	6	0	2	0	8	0
26	FW	(Iran) Hamed Abedi	0	0	0	0	0	0
27	FW	(Iran) Reza Almaskhaneh	8	2	1	0	9	2
28	MF	(Armenia) Hamlet Mkhitaryan	16	0	3	0	19	0
33	GK	(Iran) Behnam Laeghifar	0	0	0	0	0	0
40	GK	(Croatia) Tomislav Vranjić	8	0	0	0	8	0
--	DF	(Iraq) Ahmad Wale Zeyad	1	0	0	0	1	0
--	GK	(Brazil) Edgar Gomez Rodriguez	1	0	0	0	1	0
--	FW	(Brazil) Philip Barbosa	3	0	1	0	4	0
--	MF	(Iran) Hamed Hajati	0	0	0	0	0	0
--	DF	(Iran) Milad Shadmand	0	0	0	0	0	0
--	FW	(Iran) Mehdi Aghazadeh	0	0	0	0	0	0
--	FW	(Iran) Yunes Graeili	0	0	0	0	0	0

== Azadegan League Schedule ==
No.	Date	Home	Scores	Away	Goal Scorers	yellow card	red card	Crowd	Rank
1	10/9/2009	Kowsar	0 - 3	Damash	Torkashvand (4)(83), Amiri (6)	1	-	15,000	1
2	10/15/2009	Damash	2 - 1	Petroshimi	Torkashvand (20)(48)	2	-	1,000	1
3	10/23/2009	Gol Gohar	1 - 1	Damash	Amiri (45)	1	1	3,000	1
4	10/29/2009	Damash	1 - 0	Mes Sarcheshme	Shafie (90)	1	-	3,000	1
5	11/5/2009	Aluminium Hormozgan	0 - 2	Damash	Almaskhale(76), Torkashvand(87)	2	-	3,000	1
6	11/13/2009	Nassaji	4 - 1	Damash	Taheri (41)	1	-	20,000	1
7	11/9/2009	Damash	1 - 2	Naft Tehran	Abtahi (57)	2	-	500	4
8	12/3/2009	Bargh Shiraz	2 - 1	Damash	Shafie (55)	-	-	5,000	4
9	12/11/2009	Damash	1 - 0	Gostaresh	Shafie (28)	1	-	500	3
10	12/17/2009	Shensa Arak	2 - 2	Damash	Amiri (2), (4)	3	-	1000	3
11	1/1/2010	Damash	0 - 1	Shirin Faraz	-	2	-	2,000	4
12	1/8/2010	Foulad Novin	2 - 1	Damash	Taheri (18)	2	-	2,000	7
13	1/14/2010	Damash	0 - 0	Mehrkam	-	1	-	5,000	7
14	2/19/2010	Damash	2 - 0	Kowsar	Abshak (43), Abtahi (87)	1	-	1,000	5
15	3/5/2010	Petroshimi	1 - 1	Damash	Shafie (14)	3	-	2,000	5
16	3/11/2010	Damash	2 - 1	Gol Gohar	Almaskhale(20), Mokhtari(51)	2	-	500	5
17	4/04/2010	Mes Sarcheshme	0 - 1	Damash	Taheri (69)	-	-	100	4
18	4/8/2010	Damash	2 - 2	Aluminium Hormozgan	Taheri (16), Amiri (45)	1	-	6,000	4
19	4/16/2010	Damash	1 - 1	Nassaji	Taheri (44)	1	-	7,000	4
20	4/23/2010	Naft Tehran	1 - 2	Damash	Amiri (25), Taheri (68)	1	-	500	2
21	5/14/2010	Damash	2 - 1	Bargh Shiraz	Taheri (29),(83)	-	-	10,000	2
22	6/05/2010	Gostaresh	1 - 3	Damash	Shafie (42), Amiri (44)(78)	2	-	500	2
23	6/11/2010	Damash	1 - 0	Shensa Arak	Amiri (86)	2	-	3,000	2
24	6/17/2010	Shirin Faraz	1 - 0	Damash	-	1	-	1,500	2
25	6/21/2010	Damash	3 - 0	Foolad Novin	Taheri (48)(85), Hajati (90)	2	-	1,000	2
26	6/27/2010	Mehrkam	1 - 2	Damash	Hajati (72)(94)	2	-	1,500	2

=== Damash in Azadegan League 2009/10 Classification ===
	Team	GP	W	D	L	Pts	GF	GA	GD
1	Naft	26	13	10	3	49	33	16	+17
2	Damash Gilan	26	14	6	6	48	38	26	+12
3	Bargh Shiraz	26	14	6	6	48	33	23	+10

=== Azadegan League Summary of Results ===
	GP	W	D	L	Pts	GF	GA	GD
Host	7	4	1	2	12	7	5	+2
Away	7	2	2	3	8	11	11	0

=== Promotion Play Off ===
Team 1	Agg.	Team 2	1st leg	2nd leg
Damash	2-7	Sanat Naft	1-5	1-2

=== First leg ===
July 2, 2010
18:00

Sanat Naft	5-1	Damash Gilan
Zolfonoun 15'; Rikani 30'; Saki 15'; Mardasi 50' 79'		Amiri 37'

Takhti Stadium, Abadan

=== Return leg ===
July 8, 2010
18:00

Damash Gilan	1-2	Sanat Naft
Taheri 40'		Gaúcho Da Silva 37'; Niknafs 86'

Sardar Jangal Stadium, Rasht

== Damash Hazfi Cup Schedule ==
No.	Step	Date	Home	Scores	Away	Goal Scorers	yellow card	red card	Crowd
1	Second Round	Nov-26-2009	Damash	2-0	Niroye Zamini	Taheri (10), Shafiei (55)	-	-	3,000
2	Third Round	Dec-23-2009	Damash	1-0	Naft Tehran	Amiri (80)	2	-	200
3	1/16 Final	Feb-25-2010	Damash	1-0	Moghavemat	Abtahi (53)	1	-	8,000
4	1/8 Final	Mar-19-2010	Gostaresh	1-0	Damash	-	3	-	3,000

== Goalscorers ==
Scorer	League	Hazfi Cup	Total
(Iran) Ali Amiri	10	1	11
(Iran) Reza Taheri	9	1	10
(Iran) Shahin Shafiei	5	1	6
(Iran) Amin Torkashvand	5	-	5
(Iran) Mostafa Hajati	3	-	3
(Iran) Masoud Abtahi	2	1	3
(Iran) Mohamadreza Almaskhaneh	2	-	2
(Iran) Mohammad Abshak	1	-	1
(Iran) Mohammad Mokhtari	1	-	1
Total goals scored	38	4	42

== Squad changes during 2009/10 season ==
=== In ===
No.	Position	Player	Moving from	League	Transfer Window
11	FW	(Iran) Reza Taheri	(Iran) Foolad	Iran Pro League	Summer
10	MF	(Iran) Amin Torkashvand	(Iran) Rah Ahan	Iran Pro League	Summer
22	FW	(Iran) Shahin Shafie	(Iran) Saba Qom	Iran Pro League	Summer
23	MF	(Iran) Ali Amiri	(Iran) Saba Qom	Iran Pro League	Summer
7	MF	(Iran) Mohsen Rasouli	(Iran) Esteghlal Ahvaz	Iran Pro League	Summer
6	MF	(Iran) Mostafa Haghipour	(Iran) Saba Qom	Iran Pro League	Summer
3	DF	(Iran) Taghi Ghasemzadeh	(Iran) Nirouye Zamini	(Iran) 2nd Division	Summer
	FW	(Iran) Yunes Geraeili	(Iran) Moghavemat Sepasi	Iran Pro League	Summer
5	DF	(Iran) Reza Aghamohammadi	(Iran) Naft Tehran	(Iran) Azadegan League	Summer
4	MF	(Iran) Amir Azhari	(Iran) Saba Qom	Iran Pro League	Summer
	DF	(Iraq) Ahmad Wale Zeyd	(Iraq) Moghavemat Sepasi	(Iraq) Iraqi Premier League	Summer
8	MF	(Iran) Mehrzad Rezaei	(Iran) Esteghlal Ahvaz	Iran Pro League	Summer
17	FW	(Iran) Masoud Abtahi	(Iran) Tractor Sazi	Iran Pro League	Summer
1	GK	(Iran) Mohsen Forouzanfar	(Iran) Malavan	Iran Pro League	Summer
12	GK	(Brazil) Edgar Gomez Rodriguez	(Brazil) América Futebol Clube	(Brazil) Campeonato Brasileiro Série B	Summer
28	MF	(Armenia) Hamlet Mkhitaryan	(Armenia) Banants Yerevan	(Armenia) Armenian Premier League	Fall
40	GK	(Serbia) Tomislav Vranjić	(Greece) AEL	Super League Greece	Fall

=== Out ===
No.	Position	Player	Moving to	League	Transfer Window
10	FW	(Iran) Afshin Chavoshi	(Iran) Steel Azin	Iran Pro League	Summer
1	GK	(Iran) Ali Nazarmohammadi	(Iran) Steel Azin	Iran Pro League	Summer
11	MF	(Iran) Mohammad Reza Mahdavi	(Iran) Steel Azin	Iran Pro League	Summer
15	MF	(Iran) Behnam Afsheh	(Iran) Moghavemat Sepasi	Iran Pro League	Summer
7	DF	(Iran) Reza Niknazar	(Iran) Nassaji Mazandaran	(Iran) Azadegan League	Summer
6	MF	(Iran) Mehdi Noori	(Iran) Shahin Bushehr	Iran Pro League	Summer
5	DF	(Iran) Ali Ashourizad	(Iran) Steel Azin	Iran Pro League	Summer
4	MF	(Iran) Habib Houshyar	(Iran) Shahin Bushehr	Iran Pro League	Summer
16	MF	(Iran) Amir Hossein Yousefi	(Iran) Mes Kerman	Iran Pro League	Summer
22	GK	(Iran) Farshid Karimi	(Iran) Rah Ahan	Iran Pro League	Summer
3	MF	(Serbia) Ivan Dragičević	(Iran) Damash Iranian	(Iran) Azadegan League	Summer
27	FW	(Iran) Hossein Ebrahimi	(Iran) Malavan	Iran Pro League	Summer
21	FW	(Brazil) Adriano Alvez	(Iran) Malavan	Iran Pro League	Summer
8	DF	(Iran) Alireza Nazifkar	(Iran) Nassaji Mazandaran	(Iran) Azadegan League	Summer
17	DF	(Cameroon) William Djongo	Free Agent		Summer
33	DF	(Iraq) Ahmad Wale Zeyad	Free Agent		Fall
12	GK	(Brazil) Edgar Gomez Rodriguez	Free Agent		Fall
	FW	(Brazil) Philip Barbosa	Free Agent		Fall
