= 2004 AFC U-17 Championship =

AFC U-17選手権2004

Tournament details
- Host country: Japan
- Dates: 4–18 September
- Teams: 16 (from 1 confederation)

Final positions
- Champions: China (2nd title)
- Runners-up: North Korea
- Third place: Qatar
- Fourth place: Iran

Tournament statistics
- Matches played: 32
- Goals scored: 95 (2.97 per match)

The 2004 AFC U-17 Championship was the 11th AFC U-17 Championship, which was held between 4 and 18 September 2004 in Japan.

China won their second title after beating Korea DPR 1–0 in the final.

== Qualification ==
- Bangladesh
- China
- India
- Iran
- Iraq
- North Korea
- South Korea
- Kuwait
- Laos
- Malaysia
- Oman
- Qatar
- Thailand
- Uzbekistan
- Vietnam
- Japan (as hosts)

== Venues ==
The matches were played in the following five venues. Three venues in the Shizuoka Prefecture and two in the Fukushima Prefecture.

| Naraha | 2004 AFC U-17 Championship is located in Japan | Kōriyama |
|---|---|---|
| J-Village Stadium | 2004 AFC U-17 Championship is located in Japan | Koriyama Football Ground |
| Capacity: 5,000 | 2004 AFC U-17 Championship is located in Japan | Capacity: 3,722 |
Shizuoka
| Fujieda General Athletics Ground | Kusanagi Track and Field | Outsourcing Stadium Nihondaira |
| Capacity: 13,000 | Capacity: 28,000 | Capacity: 18,500 |

== Group stage ==
=== Group A ===
| Pos | Team | Pld | W | D | L | GF | GA | GD | Pts | Qualification |
|---|---|---|---|---|---|---|---|---|---|---|
| 1 | China | 3 | 2 | 0 | 1 | 5 | 5 | 0 | 6 | Knockout stage |
| 2 | North Korea | 3 | 1 | 1 | 1 | 5 | 3 | +2 | 4 | Knockout stage |
| 3 | Japan (H) | 3 | 1 | 1 | 1 | 4 | 3 | +1 | 4 | |
| 4 | Thailand | 3 | 1 | 0 | 2 | 4 | 7 | −3 | 3 | |

Source: AFC
(H) Hosts
4 September 2004
16:30

| China | 2–1 | Thailand |
|---|---|---|
| Wang Weilong 22'; Yang Xu 87' | Report | Sakarin 83' |

Fujieda General Athletics Ground, Fujieda
Attendance: 767
Referee: Sabah Kasim Khalaf (Iraq)
4 September 2004
19:00

| Japan | 0–0 | North Korea |
|---|---|---|
| | Report |

Fujieda General Athletics Ground, Fujieda
Attendance: 2,196
Referee: Mohammad Mansour (Lebanon)

6 September 2004
16:30

| North Korea | 1–2 | China |
|---|---|---|
| Pak Chol-min 42' | Report | Yang Jian 32'; Gu Jinjin 61' |

Kusanagi Track and Field, Shizuoka
Attendance: 472
Referee: Salem Mujghef (Jordan)
6 September 2004
19:00

| Thailand | 2–1 | Japan |
|---|---|---|
| Sakarin 45+1' (pen.); Chokchai 57' | Report | Dogaki 27' |

Kusanagi Track and Field, Shizuoka
Attendance: 1,300
Referee: Vladislav Tseytlin (Uzbekistan)

8 September 2004
19:00

| China | 1–3 | Japan |
|---|---|---|
| Yang Xu 12' | Report | Aoyama 28'; Kurata 47'; Cui Nanri 90+1' (o.g.) |

Fujieda General Athletics Ground, Fujieda
Attendance: 1,087
Referee: Abdul Malik Abdul Bashir (Singapore)
8 September 2004
19:00

| Thailand | 1–4 | North Korea |
|---|---|---|
| Sakarin 74' | Report | Myong In-ho 53'; Jon Kwang-ik 65'; Choe Myong-ho 68'; Ri Chol-myong 75' |

Outsourcing Stadium Nihondaira, Shimizu-ku
Attendance: 637
Referee: Mohammad Mansour (Lebanon)

=== Group B ===
| Pos | Team | Pld | W | D | L | GF | GA | GD | Pts | Qualification |
|---|---|---|---|---|---|---|---|---|---|---|
| 1 | South Korea | 3 | 3 | 0 | 0 | 12 | 0 | +12 | 9 | Knockout stage |
| 2 | Oman | 3 | 2 | 0 | 1 | 4 | 4 | 0 | 6 | Knockout stage |
| 3 | Laos | 3 | 1 | 0 | 2 | 2 | 11 | −9 | 3 | |
| 4 | Vietnam | 3 | 0 | 0 | 3 | 2 | 5 | −3 | 0 | |

Source: AFC
4 September 2004
16:30

| South Korea | 3–0 | Oman |
|---|---|---|
| Choi Kyung-bok 3'; Lee Chung-yong 48', 77' | Report |

J-Village Stadium, Naraha
Attendance: 400
Referee: Ramachandran Krishnan (Malaysia)
4 September 2004
19:00

| Vietnam | 1–2 | Laos |
|---|---|---|
| Huỳnh Phúc Hiệp 46' | Report | Singto 4', 13' |

J-Village Stadium, Naraha
Attendance: 350
Referee: Mohamed Al-Zarouni (United Arab Emirates)

6 September 2004
16:30

| Oman | 2–1 | Vietnam |
|---|---|---|
| F. Al-Balushi 78' (pen.); Al-Yaqoubi 90+2' (pen.) | Report | Nguyễn Quang Tình 47' (pen.) |

J-Village Stadium, Naraha
Attendance: 91
Referee: Mansour Sadeq (Kuwait)
6 September 2004
19:00

| Laos | 0–8 | South Korea |
|---|---|---|
| | Report | Lee Chung-yong 31'; Koh Myong-jin 57', 65'; Lim Se-hean 62'; Park Jung-hoon 75', 78'; Lim Sung-Teak 85', 88' |

J-Village Stadium, Naraha
Attendance: 274
Referee: Praveer Bose (India)

8 September 2004
15:00

| South Korea | 1–0 | Vietnam |
|---|---|---|
| Koh Myong-jin 71' | Report |

J-Village Stadium, Naraha
Attendance: 158
Referee: Ramachandran Krishnan (Malaysia)
8 September 2004
15:00

| Oman | 2–0 | Laos |
|---|---|---|
| Abdulwahed 49'; Al-Yaqoubi 87' | Report |

Koriyama Football Ground, Kōriyama
Attendance: 450
Referee: Khader Haj Khader (Syria)

=== Group C ===
| Pos | Team | Pld | W | D | L | GF | GA | GD | Pts | Qualification |
|---|---|---|---|---|---|---|---|---|---|---|
| 1 | Iran | 3 | 3 | 0 | 0 | 9 | 1 | +8 | 9 | Knockout stage |
| 2 | Kuwait | 3 | 1 | 1 | 1 | 3 | 4 | −1 | 4 | Knockout stage |
| 3 | India | 3 | 1 | 0 | 2 | 3 | 4 | −1 | 3 | |
| 4 | Malaysia | 3 | 0 | 1 | 2 | 1 | 7 | −6 | 1 | |

Source: AFC
5 September 2004
16:30

| India | 0–1 | Iran |
|---|---|---|
| | Report | Amiri 76' |

Fujieda General Athletics Ground, Fujieda
Attendance: 123
Referee: Abdul Malik Abdul Bashir (Singapore)
5 September 2004
19:00

| Malaysia | 0–0 | Kuwait |
|---|---|---|
| | Report |

Fujieda General Athletics Ground, Fujieda
Attendance: 106
Referee: Tan Hai (China)

7 September 2004
16:30

| Iran | 5–0 | Malaysia |
|---|---|---|
| Fatahi 5'; Yampi 11', 87', 88'; Assakereh 67' | Report |

Outsourcing Stadium Nihondaira, Shimizu-ku
Attendance: 50
Referee: Ram Krishna Ghosh (Bangladesh)
7 September 2004
19:00

| Kuwait | 2–1 | India |
|---|---|---|
| Al Jaser 58'; Al-Fadhel 88' | Report | Hmar 66' |

Outsourcing Stadium Nihondaira, Shimizu-ku
Attendance: 159
Referee: Yu Yong-mok (North Korea)

9 September 2004
19:00

| India | 2–1 | Malaysia |
|---|---|---|
| Pohshna 25'; Pradhan 52' | Report | Nizam 41' |

Fujieda General Athletics Ground, Fujieda
Attendance: 35
Referee: Salem Mujghef (Jordan)
9 September 2004
19:00

| Iran | 3–1 | Kuwait |
|---|---|---|
| Faradonbeh 14'; Yampi 19'; Fatahi 75' | Report | Al Buti 24' |

Outsourcing Stadium Nihondaira, Shimizu-ku
Attendance: 130
Referee: Tan Hai (China)

=== Group D ===
| Pos | Team | Pld | W | D | L | GF | GA | GD | Pts | Qualification |
|---|---|---|---|---|---|---|---|---|---|---|
| 1 | Qatar | 3 | 2 | 1 | 0 | 9 | 3 | +6 | 7 | Knockout stage |
| 2 | Iraq | 3 | 2 | 0 | 1 | 7 | 3 | +4 | 6 | Knockout stage |
| 3 | Uzbekistan | 3 | 0 | 2 | 1 | 4 | 7 | −3 | 2 | |
| 4 | Bangladesh | 3 | 0 | 1 | 2 | 3 | 10 | −7 | 1 | |

Source: AFC
5 September 2004
16:30

| Uzbekistan | 1–1 | Bangladesh |
|---|---|---|
| Berdiev 11' | Report | Z. Hossain 50' |

J-Village Stadium, Naraha
Attendance: 180
Referee: Ramachandran Krishnan (Malaysia)
5 September 2004
19:00

| Qatar | 1–0 | Iraq |
|---|---|---|
| Al Yazeedi 19' | Report |

J-Village Stadium, Naraha
Attendance: 190
Referee: Yuichi Nishimura (Japan)

7 September 2004
16:30

| Bangladesh | 1–6 | Qatar |
|---|---|---|
| Mia 9' | Report | Afif 56', 75'; Al-Qutaiti 59'; Ibrahim 71'; Ahmed 81', 90' |

J-Village Stadium, Naraha
Attendance: 168
Referee: Khader Haj Khader (Syria)
7 September 2004
19:00

| Iraq | 4–1 | Uzbekistan |
|---|---|---|
| Mahsan 7'; Jabbar 67'; Hamed 77'; Muhsin 90' | Report | Turaev 16' |

J-Village Stadium, Naraha
Attendance: 192
Referee: Jaafar Al-Khabbaz (Bahrain)

9 September 2004
15:00

| Uzbekistan | 2–2 | Qatar |
|---|---|---|
| Turaev 68'; Berdiev 90+3' | Report | Ahmed 21'; Fareed 55' |

J-Village Stadium, Naraha
Attendance: 200
Referee: Yuichi Nishimura (Japan)
9 September 2004
15:00

| Bangladesh | 1–3 | Iraq |
|---|---|---|
| Chowdhury 46' | Report | Mahmood 19'; Muhsin 65'; Hamed 84' |

Koriyama Football Ground, Kōriyama
Attendance: 392
Referee: Jaafar Al-Khabbaz (Bahrain)

== Knockout stages ==
=== Knockout Map ===
Quarter-finals
12 September
China | 1
Oman | 0
12 September
Iran | 3
Iraq | 0
12 September
South Korea | 0
North Korea | 1
12 September
Qatar | 4
Kuwait | 3

Semi-finals
15 September
China | 3
Iran | 0
15 September
North Korea (PSO) | 0 (7)
Qatar | 0 (6)

Final
18 September
China | 1
North Korea | 0
Third place
18 September
Iran | 1
Qatar | 2

=== Quarter-finals ===
12 September 2004
19:00

| China | 1–0 | Oman |
|---|---|---|
| Zhu Yifan 47' |

Fujieda General Athletics Ground, Fujieda

12 September 2004
19:00

| Iran | 3–0 | Iraq |
|---|---|---|
| Ipakchi 8'; Yampi 60', 68' |

Outsourcing Stadium Nihondaira, Shimizu-ku

12 September 2004
16:00

| South Korea | 0–1 | North Korea |
|---|---|---|
| | | Pak Chol-min 37' |

Fujieda General Athletics Ground, Fujieda

12 September 2004
16:00

| Qatar | 4–3 | Kuwait |
|---|---|---|
| Ahmed 5', 38'; Khalfan 8'; Al Yazeedi 69' | | Enezi 49'; Banna 56'; Buti 64' |

Outsourcing Stadium Nihondaira, Shimizu-ku

=== Semi-finals ===
15 September 2004
19:00

| China | 3–0 | Iran |
|---|---|---|
| Yang Xu 37'; Huang Jie 40', 73' |

Kusanagi Track and Field, Shizuoka

15 September 2004
16:00

| North Korea | 0–0 | Qatar |
Penalties
| | 7–6 |

Kusanagi Track and Field, Shizuoka

=== Third place play-off ===
18 September 2004
16:00

| Iran | 1–2 | Qatar |
|---|---|---|
| Ali Amiri 37' | | Ahmed 15', 48' |

Fujieda General Athletics Ground, Fujieda

=== Finals ===
18 September 2004
19:00

| China | 1–0 | North Korea |
|---|---|---|
| Wang Weilong 85' |

Fujieda General Athletics Ground, Fujieda

== Winners ==
AFC U-17 Championship 2004 winners

China
Second title

== Goalscorers ==
There were 95 goals scored in 32 matches, for an average of 2.97 goals per match.

7 goals

- (Qatar) Yusef Ahmed

6 goals

- (Iran) Shahab Yampi

3 goals

- (China) Yang Xu
- (South Korea) Koh Myong-jin
- (South Korea) Lee Chung-yong
- (Thailand) Sakarin Chanyotha

2 goals

- (China) Huang Jie
- (China) Wang Weilong
- (Iran) Ali Amiri
- (Iran) Hossein Fatahi
- (Iraq) Ajeel Hamed
- (Iraq) Ahmed Muhsin
- (Kuwait) Abdulrazaq Al Buti
- (Laos) Lamnao Singto
- (North Korea) Pak Chol-min
- (Oman) Jalal Al-Yaqoubi
- (Qatar) Ali Afif
- (Qatar) Mohammed Al Yazeedi
- (South Korea) Lim Sung-taek
- (South Korea) Park Jung-hoon
- (Uzbekistan) Anvar Berdiev
- (Uzbekistan) Lutfulla Turaev

1 goal

- (Bangladesh) Mithun Chowdhury
- (Bangladesh) Mohamed Zahid Hossain
- (Bangladesh) Rajon Mia
- (China) Gu Jinjin
- (China) Yang Jian
- (China) Zhu Yifan
- (India) Zaidinmawia Hmar
- (India) Poibang Pohshna
- (India) Sanju Pradhan
- (Iran) Hossein Assakereh
- (Iran) Benyamin Faradonbeh
- (Iran) Amirhossein Ipakchi
- (Iraq) Akram Jabbar
- (Iraq) Muhammad Mahmood
- (Iraq) Noor Aldeen Mahsan
- (Japan) Jun Aoyama
- (Japan) Ryuichi Dogaki
- (Japan) Shu Kurata
- (Kuwait) Bader Al Banna
- (Kuwait) Abdulaziz Al Enezi
- (Kuwait) Amer Al-Fadhel
- (Kuwait) Bader Al Jaser
- (Malaysia) Nizam Yaaqob
- (North Korea) Choe Myong-ho
- (North Korea) Jon Kwang-ik
- (North Korea) Myong In-ho
- (North Korea) Ri Chol-myong
- (Oman) Mohammed Abdulwahed
- (Oman) Faiz Al-Balushi
- (Qatar) Marzouq Al-Qutaiti
- (Qatar) Khalid Fareed
- (Qatar) Khalfan Ibrahim
- (South Korea) Choi Kyung-bok
- (South Korea) Lim Se-haen
- (Thailand) Chokchai Chuchai
- (Vietnam) Huỳnh Phúc Hiệp
- (Vietnam) Nguyễn Quang Tình

1 own goal

- (China) Cui Nanri (against Japan)

== Teams qualified for 2005 FIFA U-17 World Championship ==
- China
- North Korea
- Qatar
