= Afshin Esmaeilzadeh =

Iranian football player

Personal information
- Full name: Afshin Esmaeilzadeh
- Date of birth: 21 April 1992 (age 34)
- Place of birth: Rasht, Iran
- Height: 1.83 m (6 ft 0 in)
- Position: Attacking midfielder

Team information
- Current team: Esteghlal Jonoub
- Number: 10

Youth career
- 2008–2009: Damash
- 2010–2012: Damash
- 2012–2013: Persepolis

Senior career*
Years	Team	Apps	(Gls)
2008–2012	Damash	1	(0)
2009–2010	→ Gahar Zagros (loan)	9	(0)
2012–2015	Persepolis	7	(0)
2013–2014	→ Beira-Mar (loan)	4	(0)
2015–2016	Mes Kerman	10	(0)
2016	Giti Pasand	7	(0)
2016	Sumgayit	10	(0)
2017–2018	Esteghlal Jonoub	0	(0)
2020–2021	Daraei F.C.		

International career^{‡}
2007–2009	Iran U17	12	(2)
2012–2014	Iran U22	1	(0)
- * Club domestic league appearances and goals as of 24 May 2018 ‡ National team caps and goals as of 6 June 2012

Afshin Esmaeilzadeh (Persian: افشین اسماعیل‌زاده; born April 21, 1992) is an Iranian football midfielder who last played for Esteghlal Jonoub in the Azadegan League.

== Club career ==
=== Damash ===
Esmaeilzadeh joined popular club, S.C. Damash on 4 November 2008 with a five-years contract.

=== Persepolis ===
After a season in Damash, he moved to Persepolis in the summer of 2012. He signed a three-years contract until end of 2014–15 season. He made his debut for persepolis on first fixture of 2012–13 season against Sanat Naft.

=== Loan to Beira-Mar ===
Esmaeilzadeh loaned out to Beira-Mar for the 2013–14 season. In November, he was put on trial at Benfica B. After only 4 league appearances with Beira-Mar, Esmaeilzadeh returned to Persepolis.

=== Return to Persepolis ===
After a half a season in Portugal he returned to Persepolis by club coach Ali Daei to spend last year of his contract.

== Career statistics ==
As of 24 May 2018

Club	Season	League			Cup^{1}		League Cup^{2}		Continental^{3}		Total	
Club	Season	Division	Apps	Goals	Apps	Goals	Apps	Goals	Apps	Goals	Apps	Goals
Gahar Zagros (loan)	2009–10	Division 1	9	0	0	0	–	–	–	–	9	0
Damash	2010–11	Division 1	0	0	0	0	–	–	–	–	0	0
Damash	2011–12	Pro League	1	0	0	0	–	–	–	–	1	0
Damash	Total		1	0	0	0	–	–	0	0	1	0
Persepolis	2012–13	Pro League	1	0	0	0	–	–	–	–	1	0
Beira-Mar (loan)	2013–14	Segunda Liga	4	0	1	0	1	0	–	–	6	0
Persepolis	2014–15	Pro League	6	0	0	0	–	–	0	0	6	0
Mes Kerman	2015–16	Division 1	10	0	0	0	–	–	–	–	10	0
Giti Pasand	2015–16	Division 1	7	0	0	0	–	–	–	–	7	0
Sumgayit	2016–17	Azerbaijan Premier League	10	0	0	0	–	–	–	–	10	0
Career total			48	0	1	0	1	0	0	0	50	0

^{1} Includes Taça de Portugal and Hazfi Cup.
^{2} Includes Taça da Liga.
^{3} Includes ACL.

- Assists

Season	Team	Assists
11–12	Damash	0
12–13	Persepolis	0
13–14	Beira-Mar	2

== International career ==
=== Iran U–17 ===
Esmaeilzadeh played a central role in the Iran U–17 winning the 2008 AFC U-16 Championship starting 5 of the six games. He captained the team in the penultimate game against Korea Republic. He featured in 3 games for Iran in the 2009 FIFA U-17 World Cup coming on as a substitute against Uruguay U–17 scoring in the 119th minute.

=== Iran U–20 ===
He was a member of Iran U–20 during 2010 AFC U-19 Championship but removed from final squad because of health problems while he infected to the Malaria with his club teammates Mehrgan Golbarg and Hossein Gohari.

=== Iran U–22 ===
He was called up to the Iran U–23 team by Alireza Mansourian in March 2012, and has been selected for the 2013 AFC U-22 Championship.

== Honours ==
Persepolis

- Hazfi Cup: 2012–13 (Runner-up)
