= Archil =

Archil (Georgian: არჩილ) is a masculine Georgian given name. Notable people with the given name include:

- Archil of Iberia (fl. c. 411–435), Georgian king
- Archil of Kakheti (fl. 8th century), Georgian ruling prince
- Archil, Prince of Mukhrani (fl. 1540–1582), Georgian nobleman
- Archil II (1647–1713), Georgian king
- Prince Archil of Imereti (died 1775), Georgian royal prince
- Archil Arveladze (born 1973), Georgian footballer
- Archil Gegeshidze (born 1956), Georgian diplomat and scholar
- Archil Gelovani (1915–1978), Soviet officer
- Archil Gomiashvili (1926–2005), Georgian actor
- Archil Jorjadze (1872–1913), Georgian politician
- Archil Kavtarashvili (born 1973), Georgian rugby union player
- Archil Khabadze (born 1980), Georgian business executive and politician
- Archil Kiknadze (1915–1967), Georgian football player and manager
- Archil Lortkipanidze (born 1970), Georgian fencer
- Archil Sakhvadze (born 1978), Georgian footballer
- Archil Talakvadze (born 1983), Georgian politician
- Archil Tsagareli (1913–1988), Georgian geologist
