= Miloš Radanović =

Montenegrin footballer

Personal information
- Full name: Miloš Radanović
- Date of birth: 5 November 1980 (age 45)
- Place of birth: Pljevlja, SFR Yugoslavia
- Height: 1.88 m (6 ft 2 in)
- Position: Goalkeeper

Senior career*
Years	Team	Apps	(Gls)
2001–2003	Rudar Pljevlja	90	(1)
2004	Sutjeska Nikšić	15	(0)
2004–2006	Banat Zrenjanin	30	(0)
2006–2007	Olympiakos Nicosia	1	(0)
2007–2008	Smederevo	15	(0)
2008–2010	Rudar Pljevlja	4	(0)
2010–2011	Damash Gilan	12	(0)
2012–2013	Mornar Bar	33	(0)
2013–2017	Rudar Pljevlja	132	(7)
- * Club domestic league appearances and goals

Miloš Radanović (Serbian Cyrillic: Милош Радановић, born 5 November 1980) is a Montenegrin retired footballer who played as a goalkeeper.

== Club career ==
Born in Pljevlja, he started his career in his hometown club, an oscillating First and Second League club FK Rudar Pljevlja where he became the main goalkeeper, and stayed until January 2004. After a brief, half season, spell in FK Sutjeska Nikšić, in 2004, he moves to the ambitious FK Budućnost Banatski Dvor, a club that was playing in the Second Yugoslav League but, was promoted, the next season, to the First League of FR Yugoslavia. Once there, the club changed his name to FK Banat Zrenjanin, the name that still uses, and Radanović became one of the best goalkeepers in Serbian football. In the summer of 2006, Miloš moves abroad to Cyprus where he plays for Olympiakos Nicosia. Next, in 2007, he was back, signing with FK Smederevo, now playing in a separate Serbian Superliga, and, since 2008, he is back to his first club, FK Rudar, now playing in the Montenegrin First League.
