= Mohammad Abshak =

Iranian footballer

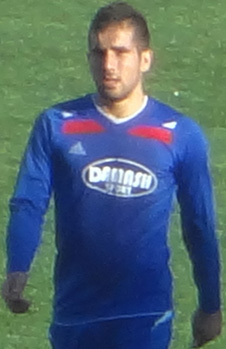
- Abshak in January 2012

Personal information
- Date of birth: 27 January 1987 (age 39)
- Place of birth: Rasht, Iran
- Height: 1.76 m (5 ft 9 in)
- Position: Defensive midfielder

Team information
- Current team: Esteghlal Khuzestan
- Number: 13

Youth career
- 2003–2007: Sepidrood

Senior career*
Years	Team	Apps	(Gls)
2007–2008	Pegah Gilan	0	(0)
2008–2013	Damash	85	(3)
2013–2014	Mes Kerman	10	(0)
2014–2015	Rah Ahan	8	(0)
2015–2017	Malavan	32	(0)
2017–2018	Baadraan	25	(3)
2018–2019	Nassaji Mazandaran	18	(0)
2019–2024	Foolad	113	(1)
2024–	Esteghlal Khuzestan	17	(0)
- * Club domestic league appearances and goals as of 30 October 2024

Mohammad Abshak (Persian: محمد آبشک, born 27 January 1987) is an Iranian footballer who plays for Esteghlal Khuzestan.

== Club career ==
Abshak starts his career with Sepidrood youth team. In 2007, after playing 3 seasons for Sepidrood, he joined Pegah that just got promoted to Iran Pro League, but could not play a single game for them because of army services, so he joined Fajr Gilan instead. In 2008—after fishing his army services—he returned to Pegah in Iran Pro League but could not play a single game again due injury. In October 2008, Pegah was sold and renamed to Damash Gilan. In the next season, Damash was relegated to Azadegan League and Firouz Karimi was appointed as a Head Coach. Abashk could prove himself to Karimi and was the starter in most of games. Since then, he has been a member of the team and one of its key players

== Club statistics ==
Last Update 9 April 2016

Club performance			League		Cup		Total	
Season	Club	League	Apps	Goals	Apps	Goals	Apps	Goals
Iran			League		Hazfi Cup		Total	
2008–09	Damash	Pro League	0	0	0	0	0	0
2009–10	Damash	Azadegan League	21	1	3	0	24	1
2010–11	Damash	Azadegan League	23	0	3	0	26	0
2011–12	Damash	Pro League	17	1	1	0	18	1
2012–13	Damash	Pro League	16	1	4	0	20	0
2013–14	Damash	Pro League	8	0	0	0	8	0
2013–14	Mes	Pro League	10	0	1	0		
2014–15	Rah Ahan	Pro League	8	0	1	0	9	0
2014–15	Malavan	Pro League	12	0	0	0	12	0
2015–16	Malavan	Pro League	16	0	0	0	16	0
Total			131	3	12	0		

== Honours ==
Foolad

- Hazfi Cup: 2020–21
- Iranian Super Cup: 2021
