= Shahab Yampi =

Iranian footballer

Personal information
- Full name: Shahab Yampi
- Place of birth: Aqqala, Golestan province, Iran
- Position: Forward

Team information
- Current team: Etka Gorgan

College career
Years	Team	Apps	(Gls)
2009	Islamic Azad University		

Senior career*
Years	Team	Apps	(Gls)
2004–2005	Paykan	3	(0)
2009–2012	Etka Gorgan		(3)

International career
2004	Iran U17	6	(6)
2005	Iran U20	4	(1)
Medal record
Representing Iran
Men's Football
World Interuniversity Games
Silver medal – second place	2009 Milan	Islamic Azad University
- * Club domestic league appearances and goals

Shahab Yanpi or Shahab Yampi (Persian: شهاب یامپی) is an Iranian football player. He is a former member of Iran U17 and Iran U20.

== Club career ==
He Played for Paykan in 2004–05 Iran Pro League and experienced a relegation with them.

=== Club career statistics ===
Club performance			League		Cup		Continental		Total	
Season	Club	League	Apps	Goals	Apps	Goals	Apps	Goals	Apps	Goals
Iran			League		Hazfi Cup		Asia		Total	
2009–10	Etka Gorgan	Azadegan League		1			-	-		
2010–11	Etka Gorgan	Azadegan League		2			-	-		
2011–12	Etka Gorgan	Azadegan League	25	0			-	-		
Career total										

== International career ==
Yanpi was a part of Iran national under-17 football team in 2004 AFC U-17 Championship, scoring 6 goals in 6 matches. He was Invited to Iran U20 in 2006 AFC Youth Championship qualification in 2005, scoring one goal against Bangladesh, He also participated in Valentin Granatkin Memorial 2005 with Iran U20 as a benchwarmer. but was not included in the final list for 2006 AFC Youth Championship.

== 2009 World Interuniversity Games ==
He was a part Silver-Medalist Islamic Azad University Karaj Branch football team during 2009 World Interuniversity Games. He committed to push referee in the final match against Nancy University.
