= Mohammad Ziaeipour =

Iranian footballer

Personal information
- Date of birth: 14 March 1989 (age 37)
- Place of birth: Iran
- Position: Defender

Youth career
- –2008: Saipa

Senior career*
Years	Team	Apps	(Gls)
2009–2010	Saipa	12	(0)
2010	Mes Sarcheshme		
2011–2012	Gol Gohar		
2018–2021	Naft Iranian		
2021–2022	Ariyan		
2022	Daraei		
2022–2023	Ariyan		
- * Club domestic league appearances and goals

Mohammad Ziaeipour (Persian: محمد ضیایی پور; born 14 March 1989) is an Iranian former footballer.

== Club career ==
Club performance			League		Cup		Continental		Total	
Season	Club	League	Apps	Goals	Apps	Goals	Apps	Goals	Apps	Goals
Iran			League		Hazfi Cup		Asia		Total	
2009–10	Saipa	Persian Gulf Cup	12	0	0	0	-	-	12	0
2010–11	Saipa	Persian Gulf Cup	0	0	0	0	-	-	0	0
Total	Iran		12	0	0	0	0	0	12	0
Career total			12	0	10	0	0	0	12	0
