= Rouhollah Samieinia =

Iranian footballer

Personal information
- Full name: Rouhollah Samieinia
- Date of birth: 17 March 1979 (age 47)
- Place of birth: Tehran, Iran
- Height: 1.86 m (6 ft 1 in)
- Position: Left back

Senior career*
Years	Team	Apps	(Gls)
2004	Saipa F.C.	4	(4)
2005–2007	Bargh Shiraz F.C.	3	(3)
2007–2009	Sanat Naft Abadan F.C.	2	(2)
2009–2010	Salgaocar SC	2	(8)
2010	Churchill Brothers SC	4	(1)
2011–2012	Dempo SC	1	(1)
- * Club domestic league appearances and goals

Rouhollah Samieinia (born 17 March 1979) is an Iranian former professional footballer who played for as a defender. He has appeared with Indian I-League giants Churchill Brothers and Dempo SC.
