= Ilče Pereski =

Macedonian footballer

Personal information
- Full name: Ilče Pereski
- Date of birth: 18 July 1976 (age 50)
- Place of birth: Struga, SFR Yugoslavia
- Height: 5 ft 11 in (1.80 m)
- Positions: Defender; defensive midfielder

Senior career*
Years	Team	Apps	(Gls)
- Karaorman
2004–2005	Persepolis	13	(0)
2005–2010	Rovinj	78	(2)
- * Club domestic league appearances and goals as of 4 January 2009

Ilče Pereski (born 18 July 1976 in Struga) is a Macedonian association footballer who currently plays for NK Rovinj in the Treća HNL. He played for Persepolis during the 2004–05 Iran Pro League. Rainer Zobel has described him as "a very good player".

== Club career ==
Pereski has previously played for FK Karaorman in the Macedonian Vtora Liga.
