= Alireza Pourmand =

Iranian footballer and coach

Personal information
- Full name: Alireza Pourmand
- Date of birth: June 21, 1970 (age 56)
- Place of birth: Isfahan, Iran
- Position: Midfielder

Team information
- Current team: Saba Qom (assistant manager)

Youth career
- 1985–1990: Sepahan

Senior career*
Years	Team	Apps	(Gls)
1990–1997	Sepahan		
1997–2002	Zob Ahan		
2002–2003	Moghavemat Sepasi		
2003–2006	Pas Tehran		
2006–2007	Aboomoslem		
2007–2009	Bank Tejarat		

Managerial career
- 2010–2011: Tractor Sazi (Assistant)
- 2011–2012: Rah Ahan (Assistant)
- 2012–2013: Gahar Zagros (Assistant)
- 2012: Gahar Zagros (Caretaker)
- 2013–: Saba Qom (Assistant)
- * Club domestic league appearances and goals

Alireza Pourmand (Persian: علیرضا پورمند; born 21 June 1970 in Isfahan, Iran) is an Iranian football coach and retired player who serves as assistant manager at Saba Qom. He also managed Gahar after the resignation of Mehdi Tartar.

He is seen as an expert and pioneer of football.
