= Ali Hosseini =

Iranian footballer

Personal information
- Full name: Seyed Ali Hosseini
- Date of birth: 2 March 1988 (age 38)
- Place of birth: Khorramabad, Iran
- Height: 1.82 m (6 ft 0 in)
- Position: Full back

Youth career
- Kowsar
- Saba

Senior career*
Years	Team	Apps	(Gls)
2007–2009	Nirooye Zamini		
2009–2010	Saipa	13	(0)
2010–2012	Damash	31	(1)
2012–2014	Rah Ahan	32	(0)
2014–2015	Paykan	16	(0)
2015–2016	Esteghlal Ahvaz	5	(0)
- * Club domestic league appearances and goals

Seyed Ali Hosseini (Persian: سیدعلی حسینی; born 2 March 1988) is an Iranian former footballer.

== Club career ==
Hosseini started his career with Saipa. In summer 2010 he joined Damash. In July 2012 he joined Rah Ahan.

=== Club career statistics ===
As of 7 August 2014

Club	Division	Season	League		Hazfi Cup		Asia		Total	
Club	Division	Season	Apps	Goals	Apps	Goals	Apps	Goals	Apps	Goals
Saipa	Pro League	2009–10	14	0			–	–		
Damash	Division 1	2010–11	20	0			–	–		
Damash	Pro League	2011–12	11	0			–	–		
Rah Ahan	Pro League	2012–13	23	0			–	–	23	0
Rah Ahan	Pro League	2013–14	10	0			–	–	10	0
Paykan	Pro League	2014–15	2	0	0	0	–	–	2	0
Career total			70	0			118	118|18		
