= Sambo Choji =

Nigerian former football striker

Personal information
- Full name: Sambo Choji
- Date of birth: 13 March 1977 (age 49)
- Place of birth: Benin City, Nigeria
- Height: 1.72 m (5 ft 8 in)
- Position: Striker

Youth career
- 1993–1994: Greater Tomorrow

Senior career*
Years	Team	Apps	(Gls)
1994–1995	SF Hostenbach		
1995–2005	1. FC Saarbrücken	168	(80)
2002–2003	Eintracht Braunschweig	23	(8)
2003–2004	1. FC Saarbrücken	19	(6)
2004–2005	→ Persepolis (loan)	12	(1)
2006–2007	SKN St. Pölten	6	(5)

International career
1993	Nigeria U16		
- * Club domestic league appearances and goals

Sambo Choji (born 13 March 1977 in Benin City) is a Nigerian former football striker. Choji was an integral member of the Nigeria national Under-17 team, the golden eaglets that won the Fifa World Under-17 championship in 1993 in Tokyo, Japan. He played all games operating in the left flank as Nigeria beat title holders, Ghana, to be crowned champions a second time. He is currently retired and residing in his home city of Jos, in Plateau State, North-Central Nigeria where he has been developing future football talents.

Choji has played for Plateau United fc of Jos,1. FC Saarbrücken and Eintracht Braunschweig in the German 2. Bundesliga.
