= Koriyama West Soccer Stadium =

Soccer stadium in Kōriyama, Fukushima, Japan

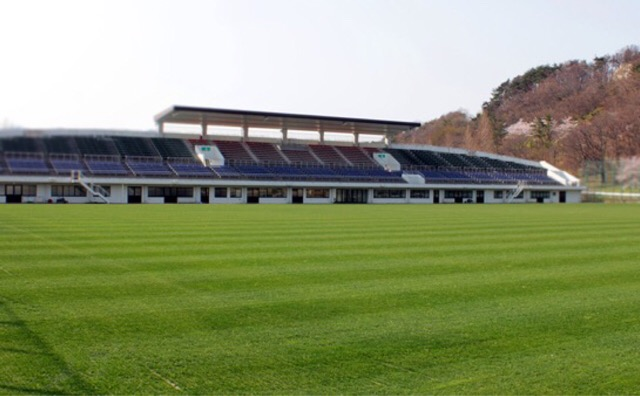
- Interactive map of Koriyama West Soccer Stadium
- Location: Koriyama, Fukushima, Japan
- Coordinates: 37°23′45.5″N 140°18′4.4″E
- Owner: Koriyama City
- Operator: FSG College League
- Capacity: 3,722

Construction
- Opened: 1994

Tenant
- Fukushima United FC

Kōriyama West Soccer Stadium (郡山西部サッカー場) is a soccer stadium in Kōriyama, Fukushima, Japan. It features natural turf but has no lighting. While J.League requires seating of at least 5,000 for J3 games, matches have been set at Kōriyama West for the future.
