= Ardalan Ashtiani =

Iranian football player

Personal information
- Full name: Ardalan Ashtiani
- Date of birth: April 5, 1982 (age 44)
- Place of birth: Tehran, Iran
- Position: Right back

Team information
- Current team: Kaveh Tehran

Youth career
- Persepolis

Senior career*
Years	Team	Apps	(Gls)
2004–2006	Persepolis	13	(0)
2006–2007	Homa		
2009–2010	Damash Iranian		
2010–2011	Kaveh Tehran		
- * Club domestic league appearances and goals

Ardalan Ashtiani (Persian: اردلان آشتیانی, born April 5, 1982) is an Iranian football player. He is the son of Iranian footballer Ebrahim Ashtiani.
