= Hamlet Mkhitaryan (footballer, born 1973) =

Armenian footballer

Personal information
- Date of birth: 24 November 1973 (age 52)
- Place of birth: Yerevan, Armenian SSR, USSR
- Height: 1.75 m (5 ft 9 in)
- Position: Midfielder

Youth career
- 1989–1990: Kotayk Abovian

Senior career*
Years	Team	Apps	(Gls)
1990–1991	Kotayk Abovian	4	(0)
1991–1995	Ararat Yerevan	84	(17)
1996–1998	Pyunik Yerevan	42	(12)
1999	Maccabi Herzliya	13	(0)
2000–2001	Ararat Yerevan	42	(6)
2001–2002	Homenmen Beirut		
2002–2003	Tadamon Sour		
2004	Vostok	16	(3)
2004–2006	MTZ-RIPO Minsk	46	(10)
2006–2007	PAS Tehran	17	(1)
2007	Pyunik Yerevan	3	(0)
2007–2009	Rah Ahan	43	(2)
2009	Banants	9	(0)
2009–2011	Damash Guilan	35	(1)
2011–2012	Parseh Tehran	21	(3)
2012–2013	Gahar Zagros	15	(0)

International career^{‡}
1994–2008	Armenia	56	(2)

Managerial career
- 2016: Parseh
- * Club domestic league appearances and goals as of 16 March 2013 ‡ National team caps and goals as of 6 September 2008

Hamlet Vladimiri Mkhitaryan (Armenian: Համլետ Վլադիմիրի Մխիթարյան;, born 24 November 1973) is a retired Armenian football player. He also played for the Armenia national team.

== Club career ==
In 2005, Mkhitaryan was on the verge of signing with Scottish club Hearts, but the contract was not signed between the two parties due to work permit complications. In October 2006, he joined the Tehran club Pas in the Iran Pro League. In 2007, after Pas was officially dissolved, he signed with another Tehran club, Rah Ahan. After playing for two seasons, he joined Armenian Premier League club Banants Yerevan and returned home. He later went back to Iran, where he signed a contract with Damash Gilan. For one season he played for a third Tehran club, Parse Tehran, and later for Gahar Zagros.

== International career ==
Mkhitaryan debuted for Armenia national team in an away friendly match against the United States on 15 May 1994. He participated in 56 international matches and scored two goals. He left the national team in 2008.

== International goals ==
No.	Date	Venue	Opponent	Score	Result	Competition
1.	18 March 2005	Sheikh Khalifa International Stadium, Al Ain, United Arab Emirates	Kuwait	1–2	1–3	Friendly
2.	6 June 2007	Vazgen Sargsyan Republican Stadium, Yerevan, Armenia	Poland	1–0	1–0	UEFA Euro 2008 qualifying

== Honours ==
- Lebanese Premier League Team of the Season: 2001–02
