= Sohrab Entezari =

Iranian footballer

Personal information
- Full name: Sohrab Entezari
- Date of birth: 21 April 1977 (age 49)
- Place of birth: Babol, Mazandaran, Iran
- Position: Striker

Youth career
- 1994–1997: Shamoushak Noshahr

Senior career*
Years	Team	Apps	(Gls)
1997–2001	Shamoushak	46	(24)
2001–2006	Persepolis	94	(27)
2006–2009	Rah Ahan	59	(8)
2009–2010	Shahrdari Tabriz	13	(6)
2010–2011	Tarbiat Yazd	10	(3)
- * Club domestic league appearances and goals as of 20:52,May 2009(UTC)

Sohrab Entezari (Persian: سهراب انتظاری; born April 21, 1977) is a retired Iranian footballer.

== Club career statistics ==
Last update: May 21, 2011

Season	Team	Division	Apps	Goals
2001–02	Persepolis	1	18	9
2002–03	Persepolis	1	16	3
2003–04	Persepolis	1	19	4
2004–05	Persepolis	1	23	8
2005–06	Persepolis	1	18	3
2006–07	Rah Ahan	1	12	0
2007–08	Rah Ahan	1	20	5
2008–09	Rah Ahan	1	27	3
2009–10	Shahrdari Tabriz	2	13	6
2010–11	Tarbiat Yazd	2	10	3
