= Mostafa Haghipour =

Iranian footballer

Personal information
- Full name: Seyed Mostafa Haghipour
- Date of birth: May 21, 1982 (age 44)
- Place of birth: Iran
- Position: Midfielder

Team information
- Current team: Tractor Sazi
- Number: 18

Youth career
- 2001: Pas Tehran

Senior career*
| Years | Team | Apps | (Gls) |
| 2002–2006 | Pas Tehran | | |
| 2006–2008 | Esteghlal Ahvaz | 49 | (1) |
| 2008–2009 | Saba Qom | 2 | (1) |
| 2009–2010 | Damash Gilan | 22 | (0) |
| 2010–2011 | Tractor Sazi | 5 | (1) |
- * Club domestic league appearances and goals as of 6 June 2010 ‡ National team caps and goals as of 12 May 2010

Mostafa Haghipour is an Iranian footballer who currently plays for Tractor Sazi in the Iran Pro League.

== Club career ==
Haghipour joined Tractor Sazi F.C. in 2010, after spending the previous season at Damash Gilan F.C. in the Azadegan League.

| Club performance | | | League | | Cup | | Continental | | Total | |
| Season | Club | League | Apps | Goals | Apps | Goals | Apps | Goals | Apps | Goals |
| Iran | | | League | | Hazfi Cup | | Asia | | Total | |
|---|---|---|---|---|---|---|---|---|---|---|
| 2006–07 | Esteghlal Ahvaz | Persian Gulf Cup | 24 | 0 | | | - | - | | |
| 2007–08 | Esteghlal Ahvaz | Persian Gulf Cup | 25 | 1 | | | - | - | | |
| 2008–09 | Saba | Persian Gulf Cup | 2 | 1 | | | - | - | | |
| 2009–10 | Damash Gilan | Azadegan | 22 | 0 | 2 | 0 | - | - | 24 | 0 |
| 2010–11 | Tractor Sazi | Persian Gulf Cup | 5 | 1 | 0 | 0 | - | - | 5 | 1 |
| Total | Iran | | 78 | 3 | | | 0 | 0 | | |
| Career total | | | 78 | 3 | | | 0 | 0 | | |

- Assist Goals

| Season | Team | Assists |
|---|---|---|
| 2010–11 | Tractor Sazi | 0 |
