= Archil Sakhvadze =

Georgian footballer

Personal information
- Date of birth: 10 March 1978 (age 48)
- Height: 1.82 m (5 ft 11 1/2 in)
- Position: Midfielder

Senior career*
| Years | Team | Apps | (Gls) |
| 1994–1995 | FC Mretebi Tbilisi | 15 | (0) |
| 1995–1997 | FC Dinamo-2 Tbilisi | 41 | (2) |
| 1997 | FC Dinamo Tbilisi | 10 | (0) |
| 1998 | TSU Tbilisi | 3 | (0) |
| 1998–2003 | FC Dinamo Tbilisi | 131 | (6) |
| 2004 | FC Lokomotivi Tbilisi | 7 | (0) |
| 2004–2005 | Saba Qom F.C. | | |
| 2005 | FC Dinamo Tbilisi | 4 | (0) |
| 2006 | FC Tbilisi | 9 | (2) |
| 2006–2007 | FC Merani Tbilisi | 1 | (0) |

International career
| 2003 | Georgia | 1 | (0) |
- * Club domestic league appearances and goals

Archil Sakhvadze (born 10 March 1978) is a retired Georgian professional football player.
