= Amir Saadati =

Iranian footballer

Personal information
- Full name: Amir Houshang Saadati
- Date of birth: September 23, 1981 (age 45)
- Place of birth: Tehran, Iran
- Height: 1.84 m (6 ft 0 in)
- Position: Defender

Team information
- Current team: Damash Gilan
- Number: 5

Youth career
- 1999–2000: Bargh Tehran

Senior career*
Years	Team	Apps	(Gls)
2000–2002	Bargh Tehran		
2002–2005	DSV Leoben	46	(0)
2005–2006	Wiener Sportclub	36	(3)
2006–2007	Saipa	14	(0)
2007–2008	Damash Iranian		
2008–2010	Sepahan	8	(0)
2010–2011	Damash Gilan		

International career^{‡}
2002–2005	Iran U23		
- * Club domestic league appearances and goals as of 4 October 2009 ‡ National team caps and goals as of 20 August 2007

Amir Houshang Saadati (Persian: امیرهوشنگ سعادتی; born September 23, 1981) is an Iranian football defender who currently plays for Damash Gilan F.C. in the Azadegan League.

== Club career ==
Saadati previously played for DSV Leoben in the Austrian First Division.

Season	Team	Country	Division	Apps	Goals
06/07	Saipa	Iran	1	14	0
07/08	Damash	Iran	2	?	?
08/09	Sepahan	Iran	1	8	0
09/10	Sepahan	Iran	1	0	0
10/11	Damash Gilan	Iran	2	2	0
