= Tomislav Vranjić =

Croatian footballer

Personal information
- Date of birth: 12 February 1983 (age 43)
- Place of birth: Vinkovci, SFR Yugoslavia
- Height: 1.93 m (6 ft 4 in)
- Position: Goalkeeper

Youth career
- Cibalia

Senior career*
Years	Team	Apps	(Gls)
2001–2005	Cibalia	30	(0)
2005–2006	Varteks	28	(0)
2006–2008	Dinamo Zagreb	30	(0)
2007–2008	→ Inter Zaprešić (loan)	36	(0)
2008–2009	AEL	30	(0)
2010	Damash Gilan	8	(0)
2011–2012	Cibalia	20	(0)
2012–2013	Sunkar	32	(0)
2013–2014	Cibalia	28	(0)
2015	Šokadija Babina Greda	15	(0)
2015	Cibalia	0	(0)
2016	Šokadija Babina Greda		
2016–2017	Zrinski Tordinci		
2017–2020	BFC Tur Abdin	20	(0)

International career
2000–2001	Croatia U19	10	(0)
2002–2005	Croatia U21	26	(0)
- * Club domestic league appearances and goals as of 28 December 2017

Tomislav Vranjić (born 12 February 1983) is a Croatian former professional footballer who played as a goalkeeper.
