= Hossein Maleki =

Iranian footballer

Personal information
- Full name: Hossein Maleki
- Date of birth: 6 April 1990 (age 36)
- Place of birth: Iran
- Position: Winger

Team information
- Current team: Saipa
- Number: 21

Youth career
- 2007–2009: Foolad
- 2009–2010: Farhang Ramhormoz
- 2011–2012: Naft Masjed Soleyman

Senior career*
| Years | Team | Apps | (Gls) |
| 2012–2015 | Naft Masjed Soleyman | 67 | (12) |
| 2015–2016 | Foolad | 11 | (0) |
| 2016–2017 | Paykan | 17 | (2) |
| 2017-2018 | Sh. Mahshahr | | |
| 2018–2020 | Shahin Bushehr | 40 | (8) |
| 2020– | Saipa | 14 | (2) |
- * Club domestic league appearances and goals as of 29 November 2019

Hossein Maleki is an Iranian football player, who currently plays for Persian Gulf Pro League club Saipa.
