= Mohammad Sadegh Taheri =

Iranian footballer (b. 1985)

Personal information
- Full name: Mohammad Sadegh Taheri
- Date of birth: May 5, 1985 (age 41)
- Place of birth: Tehran, Iran
- Position: Midfielder

Team information
- Current team: Parseh Tehran
- Number: 8

Senior career*
| Years | Team | Apps | (Gls) |
| 2008–2010 | Damash Iranian | 41 | (5) |
| 2010–2012 | Tractor Sazi | 9 | (0) |
| 2010–2011 | → Damash Gilan (loan) | 12 | (0) |
| 2011–2012 | → Parseh Tehran (loan) | 18 | (1) |
| 2012– | Parseh Tehran | 25 | (2) |
- * Club domestic league appearances and goals

Mohammad Sadegh Taheri is an Iranian footballer who currently plays for Parseh Tehran in Azadegan League.

== Club career ==
Taheri joined Tractor Sazi F.C. in 2010, after spending the previous two seasons at Damash Iranian F.C. in the Azadegan League.

| Club performance | | | League | | Cup | | Continental | | Total | |
| Season | Club | League | Apps | Goals | Apps | Goals | Apps | Goals | Apps | Goals |
| Iran | | | League | | Hazfi Cup | | Asia | | Total | |
|---|---|---|---|---|---|---|---|---|---|---|
| 2008–09 | Damash Iranian | Azadegan | 17 | 2 | | | - | - | | |
| 2009–10 | Damash Iranian | Azadegan | 24 | 3 | | | - | - | | |
| 2010–11 | Tractor Sazi | Persian Gulf Cup | 9 | 0 | | | - | - | | |
| 2010–11 | Damash Gilan | Azadegan | 12 | 0 | 0 | 0 | - | - | 12 | 0 |
| Total | Iran | | 62 | 5 | | | 0 | 0 | | |
| Career total | | | 62 | 5 | | | 0 | 0 | | |

- Assist Goals

| Season | Team | Assists |
|---|---|---|
| 2010–11 | Tractor Sazi | 0 |
