= Amin Torkashvand =

Iranian footballer

Personal information
- Full name: Amin Torkashvand
- Date of birth: April 20, 1982 (age 44)
- Place of birth: Tuyserkan, Iran
- Position: Midfielder

Team information
- Current team: Sepidrood Rasht

Senior career*
Years	Team	Apps	(Gls)
2005–2009	Rah Ahan	91	(6)
2009–2011	Damash	38	(9)
2011–2012	Parse	24	(4)
2012–2013	Gahar Zagros	31	(4)
2013–2014	Paykan	13	(2)
2014–2015	Damash	15	(0)
2015–2016	Sepidrood	0	(0)
2017–2018	Esteghlal Jonoub	8	(0)
2019–2020	Atrak Bojnourd	4	(0)
2021–2022	Kia Pars		
2022–2024	Shahrdari Karaj		
2024–2025	Shohadaye Charbagh Alborz		
- * Club domestic league appearances and goals as of 30 April 2015 ‡ National team caps and goals as of 25 September 2010

Amin Torkashvand is an Iranian former professional footballer. He last played for Shohadaye Charbagh Alborz in the regional leagues.

== Career ==
Torkashvand played for Rah Ahan from 2005 to 2009 and then he joined the newly found club Damash Gilan, where he scored 5 goals in his first year. In the following season, he scored 4 goals for the team, helping them gain promotion to the Iran Pro League. For the 2011–12 season he joined another Azadegan League team Parseh Tehran.

Club performance			League		Cup		Total	
Season	Club	League	Apps	Goals	Apps	Goals	Apps	Goals
Iran			League		Hazfi Cup		Total	
2005–06	Rah Ahan	Pro League	23	2			23	2
2006–07	Rah Ahan	Pro League	27	1			27	1
2007–08	Rah Ahan	Pro League	25	3			25	3
2008–09	Rah Ahan	Pro League	16	0			16	0
2009–10	Damash	Azadegan League	19	5	1	0	20	5
2010–11	Damash	Azadegan League	19	4	2	1	21	5
2011–12	Parseh	Azadegan League	24	4			24	4
2012–13	Gahar Zagros	Pro League	31	4		2		6
2013–14	Paykan	Azadegan League	13	2		0		2
2014–15	Damash	Azadegan League	15	0	–	–	15	0
Career total			212	19				22
