= Ali Amiri (Iranian footballer) =

Iranian footballer

Personal information
- Full name: Ali Amiri Khodamorad
- Date of birth: March 21, 1988 (age 38)
- Place of birth: Iran
- Height: 1.86 m (6 ft 1 in)
- Position: Striker

Team information
- Current team: Oxin Alborz

Senior career*
Years	Team	Apps	(Gls)
2006–2007	Foolad	7	(2)
2007–2008	Pas Hamedan	11	(4)
2008–2009	Saba	13	(4)
2009–2011	Damash Gilan	36	(15)
2011–2012	Rah Ahan	16	(6)
2012–2013	Sang Ahan	14	(6)
2013–2014	Paykan	12	(4)
2015–2016	Pars Jonoubi Jam	25	(12)
2016–2017	Oxin Alborz	11	(4)
2018–2019	Fajr Sepasi Shiraz F.C.		
2019	Gol Gohar Sirjan F.C.		
2019	Malavan F.C.		
2020	F.C. Rayka Babol		
- * Club domestic league appearances and goals

Ali Amiri Khodamorad (Persian: علی امیری, born March 21, 1988) is an Iranian footballer. He currently plays in the striker position for the Iran Pro League club, Rah Ahan.

== Club career ==
Playing for Foolad FC in 2006–2007, Khodamorad made an appearance as a substitute in the Asian Champions League 2006 against Al-Ittihad of Syria, although he had not made any IPL appearance for the club before.

He joined Pas Hamedan in 2007 after playing only 5 games for this team Amiri joined Saba but another bad season for him, He decided to move a lower division and play for Damash Gilan in Azadegan League for 2009–2010 season.

=== Club career statistics ===
Club performance			League		Cup		Continental		Total	
Season	Club	League	Apps	Goals	Apps	Goals	Apps	Goals	Apps	Goals
Iran			League		Hazfi Cup		Asia		Total	
2006–07	Foolad	Pro League	0	0	0	0	1	0	1	0
2007–08	PAS	Pro League	5	0	0	0	-	-	5	0
2008–09	Saba	Pro League	5	0	0	0	1	0	6	0
2009–10	Damash	Division 1	23	10	3	1	-	-	26	11
2010–11	Damash	Division 1	13	2	2	2	-	-	15	4
2011–12	Rah Ahan	Pro League	9	0	0	0	-	-	10	0
2012–13	Rah Ahan	Pro League	1	0	0	0	-	-	1	0
2012–13	Sang Ahan	Division 1	10	5	0	0	-	-	10	5
2013–14	Paykan	8	2			-	-			
Career total			75	19	5	3	2	0	82	20

- Last update August 6, 2013

== International career ==
Amiri used to be part of the Iran national under-20 football team and Iran national under-23 football team.
