= Mohammad Reza Mahdavi =

Iranian footballer

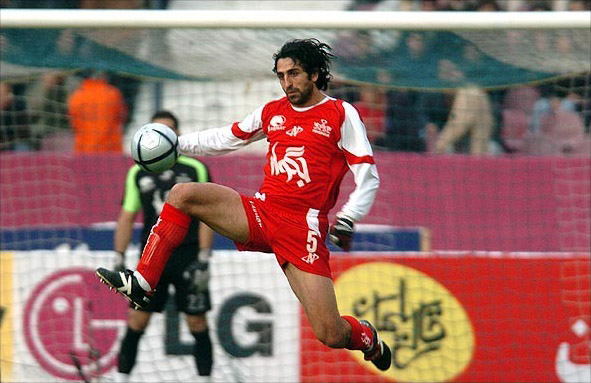

Personal information
- Full name: Mohammad Reza Mahdavi
- Date of birth: 17 December 1972 (age 53)
- Place of birth: Tehran, Iran
- Height: 6 ft 2 in (1.88 m)
- Position: Centre-back

Senior career*
Years	Team	Apps	(Gls)
1994–2000	Bahman		
2000	Esteghlal		
2000–2002	Charleroi	22	(0)
2002–2003	Persepolis		
2003–2004	Sepahan		
2004–2005	Shahrdari Bandar Abbas		
2005–2006	Esteghlal Ahvaz	9	(0)

International career^{‡}
1994–2002	Iran	6	(1)
- * Club domestic league appearances and goals as of 11:21, 8 April 2008 (UTC) ‡ National team caps and goals as of 11:21, 8 April 2008 (UTC)

Mohammad Reza Mahdavi (Persian: محمدرضا مهدوی; born 17 December 1972) is an Iranian retired football defender in the Iran Pro League. He has also previously played for the Iran national football team and was in the squad for the 2000 AFC Asian Cup.

Mahdavi played for three seasons with R. Charleroi S.C. in the Belgian First Division.
