= Behnam Afsheh =

Iranian footballer

Personal information
- Full name: Behnam Afsheh
- Date of birth: 3 April 1983 (age 43)
- Place of birth: Fuman, Iran
- Position: Midfielder

Team information
- Current team: Niroye Zamin

Youth career
- Persepolis

Senior career*
Years	Team	Apps	(Gls)
2006–2008	Pegah Gilan	27	(0)
2008–2009	Damash Gilan	23	(1)
2009–2010	Moghavemat	23	(3)
2010–2013	Damash Gilan	40	(1)
2013	Mes Sarcheshmeh	13	(4)
2013–2014	Esteghlal Ahvaz	8	(2)
2014–2015	Sepidrood Rasht		
2016–2017	Niroye Zamin		
- * Club domestic league appearances and goals as of 3 March 2014 ‡ National team caps and goals as of 25 September 2010

Behnam Afsheh (born 3 April 1983) is a former Iranian professional footballer.

== Career ==
Afsheh was part of Pegah Gilan until 2008. When Pegah dissolved, he joined a new team, Damash, for one season and scored Damash's first goal against Fajr Sepasi on 17 September 2008. By the end of the season, Damash was relegated to the Azadegan League and Afsheh moved to Moghavemat. He moved back to Damash Gilan in the summer of 2010. He was released by Damash in December 2012. He joined Azadegan League side Mes Sarcheshmeh in January 2013.

== Club career statistics ==
Last Update 3 March 2014

Club performance			League		Cup		Continental		Total	
Season	Club	League	Apps	Goals	Apps	Goals	Apps	Goals	Apps	Goals
Iran			League		Hazfi Cup		Asia		Total	
2006–07	Pegah	Division 1	20	1	1	0	–	–	21	1
2007–08	Pegah	Pro League	7	0	1	0	–	–	8	0
2008–09	Damash	Pro League	23	1	0	0	–	–	23	1
2009–10	Moghavemat	Pro League	23	3	1	0	–	–	24	1
2010–11	Damash	Division 1	21	1	3	2	–	–	24	3
2011–12	Damash	Pro League	10	0	1	1	–	–	11	1
2012–13	Damash	Pro League	9	0	0	0	–	–	9	0
2012–13	Mes Sarcheshmeh	Division 1	13	4	–	–	–	–	13	4
2013–14	Esteghlal Ahvaz	Division 1	8	2	–	–	–	–	8	2
Career total			134	12	8	3	0	0	142	15

== External sources ==
- Profile at Persianleague
