= 2008 AFC U-16 Championship qualification =

2008 AFC U-16 Championship qualification was the qualification for the 2008 AFC U-16 Championship football competition. The matches were held from 1 October to 7 November 2007.

The draw for the qualification stages was made on 22 December 2006 in Kuala Lumpur, seven groups with six teams and one group with three teams were made. However Afghanistan, the Philippines, Timor-Leste, the Maldives and Myanmar withdrew before the start of the qualification.

On 18 February 2008, the AFC Disciplinary Committee ejected eight teams for fielding overage players, including DPR Korea, Tajikistan and Iraq, who had originally qualified for the AFC U-16 Championship 2008.

The winners and runners-up of Groups A–G along with the winner of the three-team Group H qualified for the finals. Hosts Uzbekistan also qualified automatically for the finals, after qualified by its own performances during the qualification.

== Groups ==
=== Group A ===
Pos	Team	Pld	W	D	L	GF	GA	GD	Pts	Qualification
1	Syria	5	5	0	0	20	2	+18	15	Final tournament
2	Yemen	5	3	1	1	12	8	+4	10	Final tournament
3	Qatar (H)	5	3	0	2	11	11	0	9	
4	Oman	5	1	2	2	4	7	−3	5	
5	Pakistan	5	1	1	3	4	10	−6	4	
6	Kyrgyzstan	5	0	0	5	6	19	−13	0	Disqualified

Source: AFC
- All matches were held in Qatar.
- Times listed are UTC+3.
22 October 2007
17:45

Syria	6–0	Pakistan
Al Khadr 7'; Al-Mawas 32', 53', 83'; Saleh 56'; Adib 66' (pen.)	Report

Al-Arabi Stadium, Doha
Referee: Kadhum Auda (Iraq)
22 October 2007
20:00

Yemen	3–2	Kyrgyzstan
Al-Baidhani 20'; Al-Sahmi 26'; Al-Shamsi 82'	Report	Ageev 30'; Ad. T. Uulu 62'

Al-Arabi Stadium, Doha
Attendance: 50
Referee: Atallah Al-Enezi (Kuwait)
22 October 2007
20:00

Oman	1–2	Qatar
Al-Rashaidi 43'	Report	Mukhtar 55'; Muftah 75'

Suheim bin Hamad Stadium, Doha
Attendance: 200
Referee: Mohamed Al-Saeedi (United Arab Emirates)

25 October 2007
17:45

Yemen	1–1	Oman
Al-Yamani 20'	Report	Sloum 73'

Al-Arabi Stadium, Doha
Attendance: 200
Referee: Alaa Al-Abadee (Iraq)
25 October 2007
17:45

Qatar	1–0	Pakistan
Al Ansari 11'	Report

Suheim bin Hamad Stadium, Doha
Attendance: 30
Referee: Sabah Kasim Khalaf (Iraq)
25 October 2007
20:00

Kyrgyzstan	0–3	Syria
	Report	Al Kaddour 14'; Medo 39'; Al Khadr 64'

Al-Arabi Stadium, Doha
Attendance: 200
Referee: Naser Al Enezi (Kuwait)

27 October 2007
17:40

Kyrgyzstan	0–2	Oman
	Report	Bamasila 70' (pen.); Al Mukhaini 90+3'

Al-Arabi Stadium, Doha
Attendance: 10
Referee: Kadhum Auda (Iraq)
27 October 2007
17:40

Syria	3–0	Qatar
Al Khadr 29'; Al Kaddour 44'; Qalaji 53'	Report

Suheim bin Hamad Stadium, Doha
Attendance: 300
Referee: Atallah Al-Enezi (Kuwait)
27 October 2007
20:00

Pakistan	0–1	Yemen
	Report	Al-Shamsi 90+1' (pen.)

Al-Arabi Stadium, Doha
Attendance: 30
Referee: Mohamed Al-Saeedi (United Arab Emirates)

30 October 2007
17:40

Qatar	1–5	Yemen
Muftah 24'	Report	Al-Baidhani 16'; Al-Hubaishi 73', 84'; Al-Yamani 82'; Muhsen 90+1'

Suheim bin Hamad Stadium, Doha
Attendance: 150
Referee: Naser Al Enezi (Kuwait)
30 October 2007
20:00

Pakistan	4–2	Kyrgyzstan
Adil 11', 64', 71' (pen.); Hameed 36'	Report	Sataev 42'; Ba. Uulu 84' (pen.)

Al-Arabi Stadium, Doha
Attendance: 50
Referee: Atallah Al-Enezi (Kuwait)
30 October 2007
20:00

Oman	0–4	Syria
	Report	Al Khadr 38', 78'; Medo 74'; Jmhaa 86'

Al-Arabi Stadium, Doha
Attendance: 300
Referee: Alaa Al-Abadee (Iraq)

2 November 2007
17:40

Syria	4–2	Yemen
Adib 7' (pen.), 16' (pen.); Bashbayouk 22'; Jmhaa 48'	Report	Al-Shamsi 12', 36' (pen.)

Al-Arabi Stadium, Doha
Attendance: 2,000
Referee: Mohamed Al-Saeedi (United Arab Emirates)
2 November 2007
20:00

Pakistan	0–0	Oman
	Report

Al-Arabi Stadium, Doha
Attendance: 200
Referee: Naser Al Enezi (Kuwait)
2 November 2007
20:00

Kyrgyzstan	2–7	Qatar
Akz. Uulu 19', 86'	Report	Abuhezima 4', 83'; Hassan 20', 45', 68'; Alaaeldin 29'; Al Ansari 84'

Suheim bin Hamad Stadium, Doha
Attendance: 50
Referee: Alaa Al-Abadee (Iraq)

=== Group B ===
Pos	Team	Pld	W	D	L	GF	GA	GD	Pts	Qualification
1	Iran (H)	4	4	0	0	17	0	+17	12	Final tournament
2	Bahrain	4	2	1	1	5	9	−4	7	Final tournament
3	Kuwait	4	1	2	1	6	8	−2	5	
4	Nepal	4	1	0	3	7	10	−3	3	
5	Jordan	4	0	1	3	4	12	−8	1	
6	Afghanistan	0	0	0	0	0	0	0	0	Withdrew

Source: AFC
- All matches were held in Iran.
- Times listed are UTC+3:30.
17 October 2007
14:00

Nepal	2–3	Bahrain
Malla 15'; Sa. Shrestha 90+4'	Report	Al-Farhan 19' (pen.), 63' (pen.); Al-Yasi 90'

PAS Stadium, Tehran
Attendance: 50
Referee: Fareed Al-Marzouqi (United Arab Emirates)
17 October 2007
18:00

Jordan	3–3	Kuwait
Al-Qamamaz 8'; Abualsayed 53'; Bataineh 70'	Report	Arab 46'; Al-Sahli 62'; Al Dhufairi 68'

PAS Stadium, Tehran
Attendance: 50
Referee: Hla Tint (Myanmar)

19 October 2007
14:00

Nepal	3–1	Jordan
Sh. Shrestha 59'; Krishna 67'; Malla 80'	Report	Arjah 53'

PAS Stadium, Tehran
Attendance: 20
Referee: Muhsen Basma (Syria)
19 October 2007
18:00

Bahrain	0–7	Iran
	Report	Rezaei 15', 31', 48'; Yeghaneh 22'; Shirazi 60'; Sadeghian 71'; Goudarzi 80'

PAS Stadium, Tehran
Attendance: 150
Referee: Abdullah Al Hilali (Oman)

21 October 2007
14:00

Bahrain	2–0	Jordan
Al-Farhan 40' (pen.); Al-Moawda 52'	Report

PAS Stadium, Tehran
Attendance: 50
Referee: Fareed Al-Marzouqi (United Arab Emirates)
21 October 2007
18:00

Iran	3–0	Kuwait
Yeghaneh 76', 86'; Heydari 88'	Report

PAS Stadium, Tehran
Attendance: 150
Referee: Hla Tint (Myanmar)

23 October 2007
14:00

Kuwait	3–2	Nepal
T. Ebrahim 10'; Al-Ajmi 53'; Karam 58'	Report	Malla 18'; Su. Shrestha 66'

PAS Stadium, Tehran
Attendance: 20
Referee: Abdullah Al Hilali (Oman)
23 October 2007
18:00

Jordan	0–4	Iran
	Report	Sadeghian 28', 76'; Yeghaneh 42'; Esmaeilzadeh 74'

PAS Stadium, Tehran
Attendance: 200
Referee: Muhsen Basma (Syria)

25 October 2007
14:00

Iran	3–0	Nepal
Yeghaneh 51', 61'; Heydari 85'	Report

PAS Stadium, Tehran
Attendance: 50
Referee: Fareed Al-Marzouqi (United Arab Emirates)
25 October 2007
18:00

Bahrain	0–0	Kuwait
	Report

PAS Stadium, Tehran
Attendance: 70
Referee: Hla Tint (Myanmar)

=== Group C ===
Pos	Team	Pld	W	D	L	GF	GA	GD	Pts	Qualification
1	Iraq	5	4	1	0	28	2	+26	13	Disqualified
2	India	5	4	1	0	18	2	+16	13	Final tournament
3	Saudi Arabia (H)	5	3	0	2	13	7	+6	9	Final tournament
4	Lebanon	5	2	0	3	9	15	−6	6	
5	Sri Lanka	5	1	0	4	3	22	−19	3	
6	Bhutan	5	0	0	5	1	24	−23	0	Disqualified

Source: AFC
- All matches were held in Saudi Arabia.
- Times listed are UTC+3.
27 October 2007
16:15

Saudi Arabia	4–0	Bhutan
Al-Hafith 24'; Al Asiri 38'; Hawsawi 75'; Al-Aoufi 76'	Report

Prince Mohamed bin Fahd Stadium, Dammam
Attendance: 200
Referee: Ali Al-Badwawi (United Arab Emirates)
27 October 2007
17:40

Iraq	5–0	Lebanon
Jawda 37', 64'; Waleed 74'; Jabbar 84'; Azeez 85'	Report

Prince Saud bin Jalawi Stadium, Khobar
Attendance: 100
Referee: Abdulrahman Racho (Syria)
27 October 2007
19:00

India	6–0	Sri Lanka
Rai 1'; Malsawmfela 31' (pen.), 52'; Ralte 37', 74'; Ma. Singh 46'	Report

Prince Mohamed bin Fahd Stadium, Dammam
Attendance: 120
Referee: Jaafar Mahfoodh (Bahrain)

30 October 2007
16:15

Iraq	2–2	India
Salim 29'; Kueam 50'	Report	B. Singh 80'; Ghosh 87'

Prince Mohamed bin Fahd Stadium, Dammam
Attendance: 300
Referee: Jaafar Mahfoodh (Bahrain)
30 October 2007
17:40

Sri Lanka	1–0	Bhutan
Mohideen 45'	Report

Prince Saud bin Jalawi Stadium, Khobar
Attendance: 50
Referee: Mohammad Abu Loum (Jordan)
30 October 2007
19:00

Lebanon	1–4	Saudi Arabia
Kdouh 26'	Report	Hawsawi 5'; Al-Aoufi 63', 84' (pen.); Al Khamis 70'

Prince Mohamed bin Fahd Stadium, Dammam
Attendance: 400
Referee: Khalid Al-Senaani (United Arab Emirates)

1 November 2007
16:15

Lebanon	0–3	India
	Report	Devrani 9', 64'; Ma. Singh 47'

Prince Saud bin Jalawi Stadium, Khobar
Attendance: 80
Referee: Khalid Al-Senaani (United Arab Emirates)
1 November 2007
17:40

Saudi Arabia	5–0	Sri Lanka
Al Khamis 36', 45+1', 90+2'; Al-Aoufi 38'; Bkit 87'	Report

Prince Mohamed bin Fahd Stadium, Dammam
Attendance: 300
Referee: Abdulrahman Racho (Syria)
1 November 2007
19:00

Bhutan	0–11	Iraq
	Report	Jouda 7'; Jasim 22', 38'; Al-Rubayawi 46', 56', 87'; Azeez 51'; Jabbar 60', 72'; Al-Wuhaili 77'; Al-Bujasim 85'

Prince Saud bin Jalawi Stadium, Khobar
Attendance: 50
Referee: Ali Al-Badwawi (United Arab Emirates)

4 November 2007
16:15

Sri Lanka	0–7	Iraq
	Report	Al-Rubayawi 1'; Kueam 10'; Jouda 20', 32'; Jabbar 45+3'; Ali 79' (pen.); Kadhim 81'

Prince Mohamed bin Fahd Stadium, Dammam
Attendance: 70
Referee: Jaafar Mahfoodh (Bahrain)
4 November 2007
17:40

Bhutan	1–4	Lebanon
Dorji 90+1' (pen.)	Report	Sabra 13'; Khechfe 15', 80'; Noureddine 90+2' (pen.)

Prince Saud bin Jalawi Stadium, Khobar
Attendance: 100
Referee: Mohammad Abu Loum (Jordan)
4 November 2007
19:00

India	3–0	Saudi Arabia
Malsawmfela 42', 50'; Ralte 65'	Report

Prince Mohamed bin Fahd Stadium, Dammam
Attendance: 1,200
Referee: Ali Al-Badwawi (United Arab Emirates)

7 November 2007
16:15

Saudi Arabia	0–3	Iraq
	Report	Jouda 6', 59'; Jasim 38'

Prince Mohamed bin Fahd Stadium, Dammam
Attendance: 500
Referee: Abdulrahman Racho (Syria)
7 November 2007
17:40

Bhutan	0–4	India
	Report	Chettri 34'; Das 36'; Mall 68', 83'

Prince Saud bin Jalawi Stadium, Khobar
Attendance: 200
Referee: Khalid Al-Senaani (United Arab Emirates)
7 November 2007
19:00

Lebanon	4–2	Sri Lanka
Khechfe 34'; Kdouh 37'; Noureddine 42' (pen.); El Dine 90+2'	Report	Mohideen 70'; Gobarage 90+1'

Prince Mohamed bin Fahd Stadium, Dammam
Attendance: 100
Referee: Mohammad Abu Loum (Jordan)

=== Group D ===
Pos	Team	Pld	W	D	L	GF	GA	GD	Pts	Qualification
1	Uzbekistan	5	4	1	0	17	7	+10	13	Final tournament
2	Tajikistan	5	3	1	1	12	6	+6	10	Disqualified
3	Turkmenistan	5	2	2	1	8	8	0	8	Final tournament
4	United Arab Emirates (H)	5	2	1	2	20	9	+11	7	Final tournament
5	Bangladesh	5	1	0	4	14	19	−5	3	Disqualified
6	Palestine	5	0	1	4	4	26	−22	1	

Source: AFC
- All matches were held in United Arab Emirates.
- Times listed are UTC+4.
17 October 2007
16:00

Tajikistan	1–1	Turkmenistan
Ktsoev 14'	Report	Bobonazarov 38' (o.g.)

Al Wehda Stadium, Abu Dhabi
Attendance: 100
Referee: Naser Al-Ghafari (Jordan)
17 October 2007
16:00

Bangladesh	9–1	Palestine
Sohel 13', 21' (pen.), 30', 59'; Saifuddin 55', 82'; S. Hossain 45+1'; Nadim 70', 87'	Report	Al-Shaer 81'

Military Physical Education Centre, Abu Dhabi
Attendance: 200
Referee: Radwan Ghandour (Lebanon)
17 October 2007
18:30

United Arab Emirates	2–2	Uzbekistan
Ghuloom 2'; Ismail 7'	Report	Supijanov 40'; Kamolov 70', 87'

Military Physical Education Centre, Abu Dhabi
Attendance: 300
Referee: Chaiwat Kunsuta (Thailand)

20 October 2007
16:00

Bangladesh	1–9	United Arab Emirates
Sohel 64'	Report	Ghuloom 7'; Hadeed 28'; Al Hamadi 47', 52', 61', 89'; Al Ameri 80'; Ismail 86', 87'

Military Physical Education Centre, Abu Dhabi
Attendance: 300
Referee: Abdullah Al Harrasi (Oman)
20 October 2007
16:00

Palestine	0–4	Tajikistan
	Report	A. Nazarov 18', 42'; Sharipov 45+2'; Bobonazarov 78'

Al Wehda Stadium, Abu Dhabi
Attendance: 100
Referee: Khalaf Al Labani (Yemen)
20 October 2007
18:30

Uzbekistan	4–1	Turkmenistan
Abdullayev 38'; Supijanov 45', 88', 90'	Report	Orazsähedow 45+1'

Military Physical Education Centre, Abu Dhabi
Attendance: 150
Referee: Mukhtar Al Yarimi (Yemen)

22 October 2007
16:00

Palestine	1–6	United Arab Emirates
Al-Shaer 44'	Report	Al Ameri 38', 69'; Al Hamadi 39', 45+1', 66', 67'

Military Physical Education Centre, Abu Dhabi
Attendance: 150
Referee: Radwan Ghandour (Lebanon)
22 October 2007
16:00

Turkmenistan	3–1	Bangladesh
R. Kurbanov 29'; Orazsähedow 49', 82' (pen.)	Report	S. Hossain 87'

Al Wehda Stadium, Abu Dhabi
Attendance: 100
Referee: Chaiwat Kunsuta (Thailand)
22 October 2007
18:30

Tajikistan	1–2	Uzbekistan
Salokhiddinzoda 6'	Report	Abdullayev 4'; Gapparov 58'

Military Physical Education Centre, Abu Dhabi
Attendance: 250
Referee: Naser Al-Ghafari (Jordan)

25 October 2007
16:00

Uzbekistan	3–2	Bangladesh
Gapparov 67'; Shotursunov 70'; Abdullayev 73'	Report	Sohel 66'; Saifuddin 84'

Al Wehda Stadium, Abu Dhabi
Attendance: 50
Referee: Abdullah Al Harrasi (Oman)
25 October 2007
16:00

Turkmenistan	1–1	Palestine
Myradow 34'	Report	Al-Rahban 14'

Military Physical Education Centre, Abu Dhabi
Attendance: 100
Referee: Khalaf Al Labani (Yemen)
25 October 2007
18:30

United Arab Emirates	2–3	Tajikistan
Ismail 44'; Saeed 75'	Report	Ktsoev 36'; Payzov 70'; Kalugin 82'

Military Physical Education Centre, Abu Dhabi
Attendance: 300
Referee: Mukhtar Al Yarimi (Yemen)

28 October 2007
16:00

Tajikistan	3–1	Bangladesh
A. Saidov 12'; Gaforov 81', 87'	Report	Sohag 90+4'

Al Wehda Stadium, Abu Dhabi
Attendance: 100
Referee: Naser Al-Ghafari (Jordan)
28 October 2007
16:00

Turkmenistan	2–1	United Arab Emirates
Orazsähedow 65'; Mingazow 69'	Report	Al-Badooli 85'

Military Physical Education Centre, Abu Dhabi
Attendance: 200
Referee: Radwan Ghandour (Lebanon)
28 October 2007
18:30

Palestine	1–6	Uzbekistan
Sulaiman 43'	Report	Nasrulloev 30'; Supijanov 47'; Abdullayev 61'; Umarov 79', 90'; Shotursunov 90+1'

Military Physical Education Centre, Abu Dhabi
Attendance: 150
Referee: Chaiwat Kunsuta (Thailand)

=== Group E ===
Team	Pld	W	D	L	GF	GA	GD	Pts	Qualification
China (H)	4	4	0	0	28	1	+27	12	Final tournament
Singapore	4	3	0	1	17	3	+14	9	Final tournament
Mongolia	4	1	1	2	1	13	−12	4	
Guam	4	1	1	2	1	13	−12	4	
Macau	4	0	0	4	1	18	−17	0	Disqualified
Philippines	0	0	0	0	0	0	0	0	Withdrew

- All matches in Hebei Province, China
- Times listed are UTC+8
1 October 2007
13:30

Singapore	8–0	Mongolia
Salim 5', 36', 79', 87'; Stanely 58', 59', 60', 65'	Report

NFTC Stadium, Hebei Province
Attendance: 20
Referee: Sachiko Baba (Japan)

1 October 2007
15:30

China	12–0	Macau
Nan Yunqi 16', 20', 30', 51'; Wang Qingfeng 25'; Zhang Tianlong 29'; Jiang Xiaochen 36'; Guo Yi 56', 76'; Yu Baobao 83', 86', 89'	Report

NFTC Stadium, Hebei Province
Attendance: 25
Referee: Mohd Yussof Mat Karim (Malaysia)

3 October 2007
13:30

Singapore	4–0	Guam
Stanely 23'; Shahfiq 34', 68'; Salim 39'	Report

NFTC Stadium, Hebei Province
Attendance: 70
Referee: Valentin Kovalenko (Uzbekistan)

3 October 2007
15:30

Mongolia	0–5	China
	Report	Nan Yunqi 36', 45+1', 79'; Wang Qingfeng 37'; Jiang Xiaochen 54'

NFTC Stadium, Hebei Province
Attendance: 25
Referee: Jaafar Alawi Jawad Mahfoodh (Bahrain)

5 October 2007
13:30

Mongolia	0–0	Guam
	Report

NFTC Stadium, Hebei Province
Attendance: 11
Referee: Rustam Saidov (Uzbekistan)

5 October 2007
15:30

Macau	1–4	Singapore
Trigo 40'	Report	Shahfiq 29', 79'; Fazli 47'; Stanely 56'

NFTC Stadium, Hebei Province
Attendance: 5
Referee: Sachiko Baba (Japan)

7 October 2007
13:30

Macau	0–1	Mongolia
	Report	Bayanjargal 24'

NFTC Stadium, Hebei Province
Attendance: 5
Referee: Mohd Yussof Mat Karim (Malaysia)

7 October 2007
15:30

Guam	0–9	China
	Report	Wang Qingfeng 7', 26'; Sun Dong 9', 58', 88'; Wang Tong 36'; Jiang Xiaochen 62', 64'; Nan Yunqi 80'

NFTC Stadium, Hebei Province
Attendance: 10
Referee: Rustam Saidov (Uzbekistan)

9 October 2007
13:30

Macau	0–1	Guam
	Report	Diambra Odi 86'

NFTC Stadium, Hebei Province
Attendance: 5
Referee: Valentin Kovalenko (Uzbekistan)

9 October 2007
15:30

China	2–1	Singapore
Nan Yunqi 57'; Sun Dong 65'	Report	Salim 4'

NFTC Stadium, Hebei Province
Attendance: 6
Referee: Jaafar Alawi Jawad Mahfoodh (Bahrain)

=== Group F ===
Team	Pld	W	D	L	GF	GA	GD	Pts	Qualification
Japan	5	5	0	0	22	1	+21	15	Final tournament
Indonesia (H)	5	3	0	2	7	4	+3	9	Final tournament
Laos	5	3	0	2	12	3	+9	9	
Cambodia	5	1	2	2	3	15	−12	5	Disqualified
Vietnam	5	0	2	3	2	11	−9	2	
Hong Kong	5	0	2	3	1	13	−12	2	

- All matches in Jakarta, Indonesia
- Times listed are UTC+7
24 October 2007
16:00

Japan	2–0	Laos
Uchida 54'; Shibasaki 70'	Report

Lebak Bulus Stadium, Jakarta
Attendance: 300
Referee: Valentin Kovalenko (Uzbekistan)

24 October 2007
18:15

Vietnam	1–1	Cambodia
Huỳnh Vân Thành 58'	Report	Sokpheng 70'

Lebak Bulus Stadium, Jakarta
Attendance: 300
Referee: Cha Sung-Mi (Korea Republic)

26 October 2007
16:00

Hong Kong	0–1	Indonesia
	Report	Alan 47'

Lebak Bulus Stadium, Jakarta
Attendance: 5,000
Referee: Lee Min-Hu (Korea Republic)

26 October 2007
18:15

Cambodia	0–7	Japan
	Report	Sugimoto 1', 13', 32', 78', 89'; Usami 30'; Haraguchi 66'

Lebak Bulus Stadium, Jakarta
Attendance: 300
Referee: Dilovar Orzuev (Tajikistan)

28 October 2007
16:00

Vietnam	0–0	Hong Kong
	Report

Lebak Bulus Stadium, Jakarta
Attendance: 3,500
Referee: Arjunan Ajjagowder (India)

28 October 2007
18:15

Indonesia	1–0	Laos
Reffa 63' (pen.)	Report

Lebak Bulus Stadium, Jakarta
Attendance: 6,500
Referee: Dilovar Orzuev (Tajikistan)

30 October 2007
16:00

Cambodia	1–1	Hong Kong
Mony Udom 37'	Report	Fong Pak Lun 10'

Lebak Bulus Stadium, Jakarta
Attendance: 2,000
Referee: Valentin Kovalenko (Uzbekistan)

30 October 2007
18:15

Japan	2–1	Indonesia
Haraguchi 21'; Usami 29'	Report	Reffa 18' (pen.)

Lebak Bulus Stadium, Jakarta
Attendance: 7,000
Referee: Arjunan Ajjagowder (India)

1 November 2007
16:00

Laos	2–1	Vietnam
Vilayout 66'; Konekham 86'	Report	Hoàng Văn Nhuận 10'

Lebak Bulus Stadium, Jakarta
Attendance: 300
Referee: Lee Min-Hu (Korea Republic)

1 November 2007
18:15

Hong Kong	0–7	Japan
	Report	Takagi 15', 40'; Mochizuki 19'; Haraguchi 39'; Doi 60', 68'; Ito 89'

Lebak Bulus Stadium, Jakarta
Attendance: 500
Referee: Cha Sung-Mi (Korea Republic)

3 November 2007
16:00

Indonesia	4–1	Vietnam
Alan 78', 81', 87', 90+3'	Report	Nguyễn Dinh Lợi 62'

Lebak Bulus Stadium, Jakarta
Attendance: 6,000
Referee: Valentin Kovalenko (Uzbekistan)

3 November 2007
18:15

Laos	6–0	Cambodia
Soukaphone 24'; Kita 41'; Ketsada 63' (pen.); Vilayout 69', 75'; Keoviengphet 77'	Report

Lebak Bulus Stadium, Jakarta
Attendance: 300
Referee: Arjunan Ajjagowder (India)

5 November 2007
16:00

Japan	4–0	Vietnam
Doi 33'; Ito 36'; Shibahara 48'; Miyaichi 75'	Report

Lebak Bulus Stadium, Jakarta
Attendance: 500
Referee: Lee Min-Hu (Korea Republic)

5 November 2007
18:15

Laos	4–0	Hong Kong
Kita 23', 55'; Soukaphone 31', 84'	Report

Lebak Bulus Stadium, Jakarta
Attendance: 1,500
Referee: Cha Sung-Mi (Korea Republic)

5 November 2007
20:30

Cambodia	1–0	Indonesia
Sotheth 85'	Report

Lebak Bulus Stadium, Jakarta
Attendance: 6,000
Referee: Dilovar Orzuev (Tajikistan)

=== Group G ===
Team	Pld	W	D	L	GF	GA	GD	Pts	Qualification
North Korea	2	1	1	0	4	0	+4	4	Disqualified
Australia	2	1	1	0	2	0	+2	4	Final tournament
Malaysia	2	0	0	2	0	6	−6	0	Final tournament
Timor-Leste	0	0	0	0	0	0	0	0	Withdrew
Maldives	0	0	0	0	0	0	0	0	Withdrew
Myanmar	0	0	0	0	0	0	0	0	Withdrew

- All matches in Singapore
- Times listed are UTC+8
17 October 2007
19:00

Malaysia	0–2	Australia
	Report	Warren 14'; Babalj 26'

Jalan Besar Stadium, Singapore
Attendance: 200
Referee: Ram Krishna Gosh (Bangladesh)

19 October 2007
19:00

Australia	0–0	North Korea
	Report

Jalan Besar Stadium, Singapore
Attendance: 500
Referee: Vo Minh Tri (Vietnam)

21 October 2007
19:00

North Korea	4–0	Malaysia
Ri Hyok-chol 8', 35'; Rim Kwang-Hyok 48'; Jong Il-Gwan 62'	Report

Jalan Besar Stadium, Singapore
Attendance: 269
Referee: Chawalit Sananwai (Thailand)

=== Group H ===
Team	Pld	W	D	L	GF	GA	GD	Pts	Qualification
South Korea	4	3	0	1	28	5	+23	9	Final tournament
Thailand (H)	4	2	0	2	15	7	+8	6	
Chinese Taipei	4	1	0	3	2	33	−31	3	

- All matches in Bangkok, Thailand
- Times listed are UTC+7
17 October 2007
16:00

South Korea	11–0	Chinese Taipei
Rim Chang-Woo 31'; Lim Dong-Cheon 32', 50'; Lee Chang 43', 49', 74'; Lee Seung-Min 62'; Cho Min-Woo 68'; Kim Dong-Min 72'; Lee Jong-Ho 85'; Tien Chih-Yuan 90' (o.g.)	Report

Rajamangala Stadium, Bangkok
Attendance: 100
Referee: Masaaki Iemoto (Japan)

19 October 2007
16:00

Chinese Taipei	2–1	Thailand
Lin Chang-Fa 29'; Chang Hao-Wei 75'	Report	Poemtawee 44'

Rajamangala Stadium, Bangkok
Attendance: 200
Referee: Huang Junjie (China PR)

21 October 2007
16:00

Thailand	1–4	South Korea
Srisai 8'	Report	Lee Dong-Nyck 53'; Lee Chang 70'; Lee Jong-Ho 76'; Lee Seung-Min 87'

Rajamangala Stadium, Bangkok
Attendance: 200
Referee: Masaaki Iemoto (Japan)

24 October 2007
16:00

Chinese Taipei	0–12	South Korea
	Report	Lee Chang 18', 43', 55', 69'; Lee Jong-Ho 19', 21', 87'; Kim Jin-Su 49', 62'; Lee Seung-Min 71'; Nam Seung-Woo 86'; Joo Ik-Seong 90+1'

Suphachalasai Stadium, Bangkok
Attendance: 50
Referee: Huang Junjie (China PR)

26 October 2007
16:00

Thailand	9–0	Chinese Taipei
Chuaisinuan 7', 74'; Duangfa 23', 39', 58', 78'; Chumuang 81', 89'; Yooyen 82'	Report

Suphachalasai Stadium, Bangkok
Attendance: 150

28 October 2007
16:00

South Korea	1–4	Thailand
Jung Dong-Cheol 55'	Report	Cheepnurat 35'; Chumuang 71', 80'; Yooyen 84'

Suphachalasai Stadium, Bangkok
Attendance: 200

== Countries to participate in 2008 AFC U-16 Championship ==
- Australia
- Bahrain
- China
- India
- Indonesia
- Iran
- Japan
- South Korea
- Malaysia
- Saudi Arabia
- Singapore
- Syria
- Turkmenistan
- United Arab Emirates
- Yemen
- Uzbekistan (host country)
