= 2008 AFC U-16 Championship =

2008 yilgi U-16 Osiyo chempionati

Tournament details
- Host country: Uzbekistan
- Dates: 4–19 October
- Teams: 16 (from 1 confederation)
- Venues: 2 (in 1 host city)

Final positions
- Champions: Iran (1st title)
- Runners-up: South Korea

Tournament statistics
- Matches played: 31
- Goals scored: 113 (3.65 per match)
- Attendance: 73,220 (2,362 per match)
- Top scorer: (Iran) Kaveh Rezaei (6 goals)
- Best player: (South Korea) Lee Jong-ho
- Fair play award: South Korea

The 2008 AFC U-16 Championship was the 13th competition of the AFC U-17 Championship organized by the Asian Football Confederation (AFC), which was held between 4 and 19 October 2008 in Tashkent, Uzbekistan. The Qualifiers was held in 2007 from 17–28 October.

Iran won their first title after beating South Korea 2–1 in the final.

== Qualification competition ==
- Australia
- Bahrain
- China
- India
- Indonesia
- Iran
- Japan
- South Korea
- Malaysia (replacing North Korea)
- Saudi Arabia (replacing Iraq)
- Singapore
- Syria
- Turkmenistan
- United Arab Emirates (replacing Tajikistan)
- Yemen
- Uzbekistan (host country)

== Stadiums ==
Tashkent
Pakhtakor Stadium	MHSK Stadium
Capacity: 35,000	Capacity: 15,000

== Group stage ==
All times local (UTC+5)

=== Group A ===
Pos	Team	Pld	W	D	L	GF	GA	GD	Pts	Qualification
1	Iran	3	3	0	0	8	2	+6	9	Knockout stage
2	Uzbekistan (H)	3	2	0	1	10	2	+8	6	Knockout stage
3	Bahrain	3	1	0	2	3	4	−1	3	
4	Singapore	3	0	0	3	1	14	−13	0	

Source: AFC
(H) Hosts
4 October 2008
16:00

Singapore	0–7	Uzbekistan
	Report	Abdullayev 10' (pen.), 86'; Gapparov 20'; Utkin 23', 90+1'; Galeev 81', 89'

Pakhtakor Stadium, Tashkent
Attendance: 10,000
Referee: Mohammad Mansour (Lebanon)
4 October 2008
20:00

Iran	2–0	Bahrain
Sadeghian 72'; Rezaei 82'	Report

Pakhtakor Stadium, Tashkent
Attendance: 500
Referee: Peter Green (Australia)

6 October 2008
16:00

Uzbekistan	1–2	Iran
Muhiddinov 80'	Report	Yeghaneh 27'; Rezaei 55'

Pakhtakor Stadium, Tashkent
Attendance: 12,000
Referee: Minoru Tōjō (Japan)
6 October 2008
20:00

Bahrain	3–0	Singapore
Al-Dakheel 41'; Saeed 58'; Yusuf 75'	Report

Pakhtakor Stadium, Tashkent
Attendance: 170
Referee: Mukhtar Al Yarimi (Yemen)

8 October 2008
15:00

Iran	4–1	Singapore
Golbarg 31'; Darvishi 51'; Chang 67' (o.g.); Gholizadeh 85'	Report	Al-Qaasimy 81'

MHSK Stadium, Tashkent
Attendance: 1,000
Referee: Võ Minh Trí (Vietnam)
8 October 2008
15:00

Uzbekistan	2–0	Bahrain
Abdurakhmonov 44'; Muhiddinov 51'	Report

Pakhtakor Stadium, Tashkent
Attendance: 6,000
Referee: Peter Green (Australia)

=== Group B ===
Pos	Team	Pld	W	D	L	GF	GA	GD	Pts	Qualification
1	South Korea	3	2	1	0	15	3	+12	7	Knockout stage
2	Syria	3	2	1	0	6	2	+4	7	Knockout stage
3	India	3	1	0	2	3	8	−5	3	
4	Indonesia	3	0	0	3	1	12	−11	0	

Source: AFC
4 October 2008
14:00

South Korea	5–2	India
Kim Dong-jin 3'; Lee Chang 49', 61'; Rim Chang-woo 52'; Son Heung-min 72'	Report	Ralte 69', 88'

MHSK Stadium, Tashkent
Attendance: 2,000
Referee: Abdullah Balideh (Qatar)
4 October 2008
18:00

Syria	2–1	Indonesia
Jmhaa 25'; Rammal 65'	Report	Vava 36'

MHSK Stadium, Tashkent
Attendance: 2,300
Referee: Minoru Tōjō (Japan)

6 October 2008
14:00

Indonesia	0–9	South Korea
	Report	Lee Dong-nyck 2'; Kim Jin-su 5'; Rim Chang-woo 15'; Lee Jong-ho 29', 80', 90+1'; Son Heung-min 65', 75'; Kim Dong-min 86'

MHSK Stadium, Tashkent
Attendance: 700
Referee: Peter Green (Australia)
6 October 2008
18:00

India	0–3	Syria
	Report	Al-Khadr 44'; Devrani 66' (o.g.); Chettri 72' (o.g.)

MHSK Stadium, Tashkent
Attendance: 1,000
Referee: Mohammad Mansour (Lebanon)

8 October 2008
19:00

Syria	1–1	South Korea
Rammal 63'	Report	Rim Chang-woo 80'

Pakhtakor Stadium, Tashkent
Attendance: 700
Referee: Minoru Tōjō (Japan)
8 October 2008
19:00

India	1–0	Indonesia
Ma. Singh 24'	Report

MHSK Stadium, Tashkent
Attendance: 3,000
Referee: Mukhtar Al Yarimi (Yemen)

=== Group C ===
Pos	Team	Pld	W	D	L	GF	GA	GD	Pts	Qualification
1	Australia	3	3	0	0	11	2	+9	9	Knockout stage
2	Saudi Arabia	3	1	1	1	6	4	+2	4	Knockout stage
3	China	3	1	1	1	4	4	0	4	
4	Turkmenistan	3	0	0	3	1	12	−11	0	

Source: AFC
5 October 2008
16:00

China	2–1	Turkmenistan
Nan Yunqi 32'; Guo Yi 83'	Report	Durdyýew 30'

Pakhtakor Stadium, Tashkent
Attendance: 1,200
Referee: Mohsen Torky (Iran)
5 October 2008
20:00

Saudi Arabia	1–3	Australia
Al-Ghamdi 83'	Report	Domenici 14', 30'; Hamill 49'

Pakhtakor Stadium, Tashkent
Attendance: 1,000
Referee: Valentin Kovalenko (Uzbekistan)

7 October 2008
16:00

Australia	2–1	China
Lum 16' (pen.); Ibrahim 50'	Report	Jin Jingdao 45+1' (pen.)

Pakhtakor Stadium, Tashkent
Attendance: 4,000
Referee: Mohsen Torky (Iran)
7 October 2008
20:00

Turkmenistan	0–4	Saudi Arabia
	Report	Al-Aoufi 22', 55'; Al-Shahrani 32'; Al-Asiri 48'

Pakhtakor Stadium, Tashkent
Attendance: 300
Referee: Abdullah Balideh (Qatar)

9 October 2008
15:00

China	1–1	Saudi Arabia
Yu Baobao 52'	Report	Al-Khamis 71'

Pakhtakor Stadium, Tashkent
Attendance: 700
Referee: Valentin Kovalenko (Uzbekistan)
9 October 2008
15:00

Australia	6–0	Turkmenistan
Kantarovski 7'; Yabio 32'; Gapare 43', 48'; Petratos 63'; Warren 65'	Report

MHSK Stadium, Tashkent
Attendance: 3,000
Referee: Salem Mujghef (Jordan)

=== Group D ===
Pos	Team	Pld	W	D	L	GF	GA	GD	Pts	Qualification
1	Japan	3	3	0	0	13	1	+12	9	Knockout stage
2	United Arab Emirates	2	1	0	1	4	8	−4	3 (Note: Head-to-head result: United Arab Emirates 3–2 Malaysia.)	Knockout stage
3	Malaysia	3	1	0	2	5	7	−2	3	
4	Yemen (Note: Yemen were ejected from the tournament for fielding an overage player, Wesam Saleh Al-Worafi.)	2	0	0	2	0	6	−6	0	

Source: AFC
Notes:
5 October 2008
14:00

Japan	4–0	Malaysia
Shibasaki 32'; Usami 34', 70'; Miyayoshi 65'	Report

MHSK Stadium, Tashkent
Attendance: 300
Referee: Salem Mujghef (Jordan)
5 October 2008
18:00

Yemen	1–1 Annulled (Note: The match was annulled due to both teams fielding ineligible players: United Arab Emirates fielded a suspended player, Haddaf Al Ameri, while Yemen fielded an overage player, Wesam Saleh Al-Worafi.)	United Arab Emirates
Muhsen 21'	Report	Hadeed 35'

MHSK Stadium, Tashkent
Attendance: 250
Referee: Võ Minh Trí (Vietnam)

7 October 2008
14:00

Malaysia	3–0 Awarded (Note: The match was awarded 3–0 to Malaysia as Yemen fielded an ineligible player. The match initially ended in a 1–1 draw.)	Yemen
Fandi 90+1' (pen.)	Report	Al-Shamsi 10' (pen.)

MHSK Stadium, Tashkent
Attendance: 1,000
Referee: Salem Mujghef (Jordan)
7 October 2008
18:00

United Arab Emirates	1–6	Japan
Hadeed 76' (pen.)	Report	Miyayoshi 7', 16', 57'; T. Uchida 60'; Sugimoto 72', 88'

MHSK Stadium, Tashkent
Attendance: 1,200
Referee: Valentin Kovalenko (Uzbekistan)

9 October 2008
19:00

Japan	3–0 Awarded (Note: The match was awarded 3–0 to Japan as Yemen fielded an ineligible player. The match initially ended 2–1 to Yemen.)	Yemen
T. Uchida 52'	Report	Al-Shamsi 56' (pen.); Al-Baidhani 90+5'

Pakhtakor Stadium, Tashkent
Attendance: 1,000
Referee: Mohsen Torky (Iran)
9 October 2008
19:00

United Arab Emirates	3–2	Malaysia
Al-Saffar 16'; Al-Khoori 29'; Al-Ameri 58'	Report	Bukhari 68' (pen.), 72'

MHSK Stadium, Tashkent
Attendance: 1,000
Referee: Abdullah Balideh (Qatar)

== Knockout stages ==
=== Bracket ===
Quarter-finals
12 October – Pakhtakor
Iran	2
Syria	0
12 October – MHSK
Australia	2
United Arab Emirates	3
12 October – Pakhtakor
South Korea	3
Uzbekistan	0
12 October – MHSK
Japan	2
Saudi Arabia	0

Semi-finals
15 October – Pakhtakor
Iran	3
United Arab Emirates	0
15 October – Pakhtakor
South Korea	2
Japan	1

Final
19 October – Pakhtakor
Iran	2
South Korea	1

=== Quarterfinal ===
12 October 2008
14:00

Australia	2–3	United Arab Emirates
Kantarovski 48'; Sainsbury 57'	Report	Hadeed 7', 64'; Mohammad 90+1'

MHSK Stadium, Tashkent
Attendance: 500
Referee: Minoru Tōjō (Japan)

12 October 2008
16:00

Iran	2–0	Syria
Rezaei 79', 90'	Report

Pakhtakor Stadium, Tashkent
Attendance: 3,500
Referee: Valentin Kovalenko (Uzbekistan)

12 October 2008
18:00

Japan	2–0	Saudi Arabia
Sugimoto 38'; Otayf 45' (o.g.)	Report

MHSK Stadium, Tashkent
Attendance: 500
Referee: Peter Green (Australia)

12 October 2008
20:00

South Korea	3–0	Uzbekistan
Kim Dong-jin 12'; Son Heung-min 54'; Lee Chang 72'	Report

Pakhtakor Stadium, Tashkent
Attendance: 12,000
Referee: Mohammad Mansour (Lebanon)

=== Semifinal ===
15 October 2008
15:00

Iran	3–0	United Arab Emirates
Dabbagh 59'; Imani 77'; Rezaei 90+3'	Report

Pakhtakor Stadium, Tashkent
Attendance: 1,300
Referee: Võ Minh Trí (Vietnam)

15 October 2008
19:00

South Korea	2–1	Japan
Kim Dong-jin 4'; Lee Dong-nyck 26'	Report	T. Uchida 2'

Pakhtakor Stadium, Tashkent
Attendance: 500
Referee: Abdullah Balideh (Qatar)

=== Final ===
19 October 2008
16:00

Iran	2–1	South Korea
Talebat 38'; Rezaei 62'	Report	Lee Chang 90+3'

Pakhtakor Stadium, Tashkent
Attendance: 600
Referee: Valentin Kovalenko (Uzbekistan)

== Winners ==
2008 AFC U-16 Championship

Iran
First title

== Awards ==
The following awards were given at the conclusion of the tournament:

Most Valuable Player	Top Scorer	Fair Play Award
(South Korea) Lee Jong-ho	(Iran) Kaveh Rezaei	South Korea

== Goalscorers ==
There were 113 goals scored in 31 matches, for an average of 3.65 goals per match.

6 goals

- (Iran) Kaveh Rezaei

4 goals

- (Japan) Takumi Miyayoshi
- (South Korea) Lee Chang
- (South Korea) Son Heung-min
- (United Arab Emirates) Fahad Hadeed (Note: This player's goal tally includes one or more goals which the player scored in matches that were subsequently forfeited, but which AFC continues to count in its statistics.)

3 goals

- (Japan) Kenyu Sugimoto
- (Japan) Tatsuya Uchida
- (South Korea) Lee Jong-ho
- (South Korea) Kim Dong-jin
- (South Korea) Rim Chang-woo

2 goals

- (Australia) Stephen Domenici
- (Australia) Danai Gapare
- (Australia) Ben Kantarovski
- (India) Lalrindika Ralte
- (Japan) Takashi Usami
- (Malaysia) Muhamad Bukhari
- (Saudi Arabia) Ahmed Al-Aoufi
- (South Korea) Lee Dong-nyck
- (Syria) Mohamad Ali Rammal
- (Uzbekistan) Abdumutallib Abdullaev
- (Uzbekistan) Aleksandr Galeev
- (Uzbekistan) Oyatullahon Muhiddinov
- (Uzbekistan) Maksim Utkin
- (Yemen) Mohamed Hussein Al-Shamsi

1 goal

- (Australia) Brendan Hamill
- (Australia) Kamal Ibrahim
- (Australia) Jared Lum
- (Australia) Dimitrios Petratos
- (Australia) Marc Warren
- (Australia) Trent Sainsbury
- (Australia) Tedros Yabio
- (Bahrain) Salman Al-Dakheel
- (Bahrain) Sayed Dhiya Saeed
- (Bahrain) Dheya Salman Yusuf
- (China) Guo Yi
- (China) Jin Jingdao
- (China) Nan Yunqi
- (China) Yu Baobao
- (India) Manandeep Singh
- (Indonesia) Vava Mario Yagalo
- (Iran) Bahram Dabbagh
- (Iran) Ali Darvishi
- (Iran) Farhad Gholizadeh
- (Iran) Mehrgan Golbarg
- (Iran) Akbar Imani
- (Iran) Payam Sadeghian
- (Iran) Mohsen Talebat
- (Iran) Mehrdad Yeghaneh
- (Japan) Gaku Shibasaki
- (Malaysia) Fandi Othman
- (Saudi Arabia) Mohammed Al-Asiri
- (Saudi Arabia) Nawaf Al-Ghamdi
- (Saudi Arabia) Abdulrahim Al-Khamis
- (Saudi Arabia) Yasser Al-Shahrani
- (Singapore) Al-Qaasimy Rahman
- (South Korea) Kim Dong-min
- (South Korea) Kim Jin-su
- (Syria) Rabie Jmhaa
- (Syria) Asaad Al-Khadr
- (Turkmenistan) Didar Durdyýew
- (Uzbekistan) Bobur Abdurakhmonov
- (Uzbekistan) Ayubhon Gapparov
- (United Arab Emirates) Haddaf Al-Ameri
- (United Arab Emirates) Mohamed Al-Khoori
- (United Arab Emirates) Abdulla Mohammad
- (United Arab Emirates) Marwan Al-Saffar
- (Yemen) Ahmed Al-Baidhani
- (Yemen) Mohammed Muhsen

1 own goal

- (India) Ashish Chettri (against Syria)
- (India) Deepak Devrani (against Syria)
- (Saudi Arabia) Abdullah Otayf (against Japan)
- (Singapore) Kenneth Chang (against Iran)

== Qualified teams for FIFA U-17 World Cup ==
The following four teams from AFC qualified for the 2009 FIFA U-17 World Cup.

Team	Qualified on	Previous appearances in FIFA U-17 World Cup ^{1}
United Arab Emirates	12 October 2008	1 (1991)
Iran	12 October 2008	1 (2001)
Japan	12 October 2008	4 (1993, 1995, 2001, 2007)
South Korea	12 October 2008	3 (1987, 2003, 2007)

^{1} Bold indicates champions for that year. Italic indicates hosts for that year.
