= Football at the 2014 Asian Games – Men's tournament =

Men's Football Tournament at the 2014 Asian Games
Tournament details
- Host country: South Korea
- Dates: 14 September – 2 October
- Teams: 29 (from 1 confederation)
- Venues: 5 (in 2 host cities)

Final positions
- Champions: South Korea (1st title)
- Runners-up: North Korea
- Third place: Iraq
- Fourth place: Thailand

Tournament statistics
- Matches played: 56
- Goals scored: 179 (3.2 per match)
- Top scorer: (Indonesia) Ferdinand Sinaga (6)

The men's football tournament at the 2014 Asian Games was held in Incheon and three other cities in South Korea from 14 September to 2 October 2014. The opening match was played 5 days prior to the opening ceremony. The men's football tournament consisted of 29 teams.

All competing nations were required to send their under-23 teams and a maximum of three over-aged players to participate.

Hosts South Korea defeated their northern neighbours 1–0 thanks to a goal in the last minute of extra time to win the gold medal. Meanwhile, Iraq won the bronze medal after defeating Thailand with the same score.

== Venues ==
	Incheon	
	Munhak Stadium	Incheon Football Stadium
	Capacity: 49,084	Capacity: 20,891
Goyang	Ansan	Hwaseong
Goyang Stadium	Wa~ Stadium	Hwaseong Stadium
Capacity: 41,311	Capacity: 35,000	Capacity: 35,270

== Group stage ==
All times are Korea Standard Time (UTC+09:00)

=== Group A ===
Pos	Team	Pld	W	D	L	GF	GA	GD	Pts
1	South Korea	3	3	0	0	6	0	+6	9
2	Saudi Arabia	3	2	0	1	6	1	+5	6
3	Malaysia	3	1	0	2	4	6	−2	3
4	Laos	3	0	0	3	0	9	−9	0

Source: RSSSF
14 September
14:00

Saudi Arabia	3–0	Laos
Al-Ghamdi 75' (pen.); S. Al-Shehri 86'; Kanabah 90+1'

Munhak Stadium, Incheon
Referee: Minoru Tojo (Japan)

14 September
17:00

South Korea	3–0	Malaysia
Rim Chang-woo 27'; Kim Shin-wook 78'; Kim Seung-dae 82'

Munhak Stadium, Incheon
Referee: Abdullah Balideh (Qatar)

17 September
17:00

Malaysia	4–0	Laos
Zafuan 12'; Muhammad 76'; Othman 79'; Danial 83'

Wa~ Stadium, Ansan
Referee: Mohamed Al-Zarouni (United Arab Emirates)

17 September
20:00

South Korea	1–0	Saudi Arabia
Kim Seung-dae 12'

Wa~ Stadium, Ansan
Referee: Ma Ning (China)

21 September
17:00

Malaysia	0–3	Saudi Arabia
		Al-Hafith 56'; Kanabah 72'; A. Al-Shehri 83'

Goyang Stadium, Goyang
Referee: Sivakorn Pu-udom (Thailand)

21 September
17:00

Laos	0–2	South Korea
		Lee Jong-ho 42'; Kim Seung-dae 89'

Hwaseong Stadium, Hwaseong
Referee: Ahmed Al-Kaf (Oman)

=== Group B ===
Pos	Team	Pld	W	D	L	GF	GA	GD	Pts
1	Uzbekistan	3	2	1	0	9	1	+8	7
2	Hong Kong	3	2	1	0	5	3	+2	7
3	Bangladesh	3	1	0	2	2	5	−3	3
4	Afghanistan	3	0	0	3	1	8	−7	0

Source: RSSSF
15 September
17:00

Bangladesh	1–0	Afghanistan
Mamunul 83'

Munhak Stadium, Incheon
Referee: Võ Minh Trí (Vietnam)

15 September
20:00

Uzbekistan	1–1	Hong Kong
Sergeev 75'		Chan Siu Kwan 80'

Munhak Stadium, Incheon
Referee: Ali Sabah (Iraq)

18 September
17:00

Hong Kong	2–1	Afghanistan
Chan Siu Kwan 37'; Lam Hok Hei 56'		Amiri 67'

Wa~ Stadium, Ansan
Referee: Marai Al-Awaji (Saudi Arabia)

18 September
20:00

Uzbekistan	3–0	Bangladesh
Shodiev 12', 21'; Rashidov 34'

Wa~ Stadium, Ansan
Referee: Yu Ming-hsun (Chinese Taipei)

22 September
17:00

Hong Kong	2–1	Bangladesh
Annan 53'; Lam Hok Hei 73'		Sajib 77'

Hwaseong Stadium, Hwaseong
Referee: Masoud Tufayelieh (Syria)

22 September
17:00

Afghanistan	0–5	Uzbekistan
		Krimets 6'; Shodiev 42', 90+1'; Sayfiyev 50'; Sergeev 86'

Goyang Stadium, Goyang
Referee: Khamis Al-Marri (Qatar)

=== Group C ===
Pos	Team	Pld	W	D	L	GF	GA	GD	Pts
1	Palestine	3	2	0	1	5	3	+2	6
2	Tajikistan	3	2	0	1	3	2	+1	6
3	Singapore	3	1	1	1	5	5	0	4
4	Oman	3	0	1	2	3	6	−3	1

Source: RSSSF
14 September
14:00

Singapore	0–1	Tajikistan
		Asrorov 87'

Wa~ Stadium, Ansan
Referee: Mohamed Al-Zarouni (United Arab Emirates)

14 September
17:00

Oman	0–2	Palestine
		Wridat 39'; Maraaba 56'

Wa~ Stadium, Ansan
Referee: Marai Al-Awaji (Saudi Arabia)

17 September
17:00

Palestine	2–1	Tajikistan
Maraaba 34'; Musa 37'		Asrorov 30'

Hwaseong Stadium, Hwaseong
Referee: Sivakorn Pu-udom (Thailand)

17 September
20:00

Oman	3–3	Singapore
Al-Hamhami 11'; A. Said 25'; Al-Farsi 29'		Suhaimi 12'; Ramli 43'; Baharudin 85'

Hwaseong Stadium, Hwaseong
Referee: Rowan Arumughan (India)

21 September
17:00

Palestine	1–2	Singapore
Wridat 83'		Ghani 2', 18'

Wa~ Stadium, Ansan
Referee: Minoru Tojo (Japan)

21 September
17:00

Tajikistan	1–0	Oman
Ergashev 90+2'

Football Stadium, Incheon
Referee: Võ Minh Trí (Vietnam)

=== Group D ===
Pos	Team	Pld	W	D	L	GF	GA	GD	Pts
1	Iraq	3	3	0	0	10	1	+9	9
2	Japan	3	2	0	1	9	4	+5	6
3	Kuwait	3	1	0	2	6	7	−1	3
4	Nepal	3	0	0	3	0	13	−13	0

Source: RSSSF
14 September
14:00

Iraq	4–0	Nepal
Resan 5'; Mahmoud 45+1'; Chand 85' (o.g.); Bahjat 90+2'

Football Stadium, Incheon
Referee: Ma Ning (China)

14 September
19:30

Japan	4–1	Kuwait
Oshima 43'; Suzuki 50', 84'; Iwanami 74'		Najaf 70'

Football Stadium, Incheon
Referee: Ko Hyung-jin (South Korea)

17 September
17:00

Kuwait	5–0	Nepal
Al-Hamdan 2'; Al-Sanea 67', 73' (pen.), 87'; Al-Azemi 83'

Goyang Stadium, Goyang
Referee: Tayeb Shamsuzzaman (Bangladesh)

17 September
20:00

Japan	1–3	Iraq
Nakajima 36'		Tariq 12'; Adnan 48', 72'

Goyang Stadium, Goyang
Referee: Çarymyrat Kurbanow (Turkmenistan)

21 September
14:00

Nepal	0–4	Japan
		Notsuda 33'; Nakajima 54'; Suzuki 62', 70'

Goyang Stadium, Goyang
Referee: Chaiya Mahapab (Thailand)

21 September
14:00

Kuwait	0–3	Iraq
		Tariq 16', 62'; Hussein 71'

Hwaseong Stadium, Hwaseong
Referee: Abdullah Balideh (Qatar)

=== Group E ===
Pos	Team	Pld	W	D	L	GF	GA	GD	Pts
1	Thailand	3	3	0	0	11	0	+11	9
2	Indonesia	3	2	0	1	11	6	+5	6
3	Maldives	3	1	0	2	3	8	−5	3
4	East Timor	3	0	0	3	2	13	−11	0

Source: RSSSF
15 September
17:00

East Timor	0–7	Indonesia
		Sinaga 7', 11', 36', 84'; Tuasalamony 78' (pen.); Setiawan 82'; Utomo 87'

Goyang Stadium, Goyang
Referee: Yu Ming-hsun (Chinese Taipei)

15 September
20:00

Thailand	2–0	Maldives
Weerawatnodom 50'; Kraisorn 85'

Goyang Stadium, Goyang
Referee: Masoud Tufayelieh (Syria)

18 September
14:00

Maldives	0–4	Indonesia
		Lestaluhu 13'; Sinaga 50', 82' (pen.); Gatra 57'

Football Stadium, Incheon
Referee: Ali Sabah (Iraq)

18 September
20:00

Thailand	3–0	East Timor
Songkrasin 23'; Thaweekarn 59'; Inpinit 79'

Football Stadium, Incheon
Referee: Timur Faizullin (Kyrgyzstan)

22 September
20:00

Maldives	3–2	East Timor
Ali 27'; Yaamin 63'; Irufaan 73'		Rangel 20' (pen.); Maia 58'

Wa~ Stadium, Ansan
Referee: Çarymyrat Kurbanow (Turkmenistan)

22 September
20:00

Indonesia	0–6	Thailand
		Pombuppha 7'; Kraisorn 17', 90+1'; Songkrasin 57'; Thaweekarn 76'; Inpinit 82'

Football Stadium, Incheon
Referee: Rowan Arumughan (India)

=== Group F ===
Pos	Team	Pld	W	D	L	GF	GA	GD	Pts
1	North Korea	2	2	0	0	5	0	+5	6
2	China	2	1	0	1	1	3	−2	3
3	Pakistan	2	0	0	2	0	3	−3	0

Source: RSSSF
15 September
17:00

North Korea	3–0	China
Sim Hyon-jin 10'; So Kyong-jin 47'; Ri Hyok-chol 57'

Football Stadium, Incheon
Referee: Khamis Al-Marri (Qatar)

18 September
17:00

Pakistan	0–2	North Korea
		So Kyong-jin 40' (pen.); Jong Il-gwan 67'

Hwaseong Stadium, Hwaseong
Referee: Ahmed Al-Kaf (Oman)

22 September
20:00

China	1–0	Pakistan
Chang Feiya 20'

Hwaseong Stadium, Hwaseong
Referee: Timur Faizullin (Kyrgyzstan)

=== Group G ===
Pos	Team	Pld	W	D	L	GF	GA	GD	Pts
1	Jordan	2	2	0	0	3	0	+3	6
2	United Arab Emirates	2	1	0	1	5	1	+4	3
3	India	2	0	0	2	0	7	−7	0

Source: RSSSF
15 September
17:00

United Arab Emirates	5–0	India
Al-Katheeri 13', 15', 64'; Al-Ahbabi 19'; Jhingan 82' (o.g.)

Hwaseong Stadium, Hwaseong
Referee: Chaiya Mahapab (Thailand)

18 September
17:00

Jordan	1–0	United Arab Emirates
Mohammed 8' (o.g.)

Goyang Stadium, Goyang
Referee: Ko Hyung-jin (South Korea)

22 September
17:00

India	0–2	Jordan
		Al-Bashtawi 17'; Thalji 67'

Munhak Stadium, Incheon
Referee: Ma Ning (China)

=== Group H ===
Pos	Team	Pld	W	D	L	GF	GA	GD	Pts
1	Vietnam	2	2	0	0	5	1	+4	6
2	Kyrgyzstan	2	0	1	1	1	2	−1	1
3	Iran	2	0	1	1	2	5	−3	1

Source: RSSSF
15 September
17:00

Iran	1–4	Vietnam
Mosalman 66' (pen.)		Võ Huy Toàn 24'; Mạc Hồng Quân 28'; Trần Phi Sơn 69'; Ngô Hoàng Thịnh 82'

Wa~ Stadium, Ansan
Referee: Ahmed Al-Kaf (Oman)

18 September
17:00

Kyrgyzstan	1–1	Iran
Otkeev 89'		Pouraliganji 79'

Munhak Stadium, Incheon
Referee: Khamis Al-Marri (Qatar)

22 September
17:00

Vietnam	1–0	Kyrgyzstan
Vũ Minh Tuấn 63' (pen.)

Wa~ Stadium, Ansan
Referee: Tayeb Shamsuzzaman (Bangladesh)

== Knockout round ==
Round of 16
25 September
South Korea	3
Hong Kong	0
25 September
Palestine	0
Japan	4
25 September
Thailand	2
China	0
25 September
Jordan (a.e.t.)	2
Kyrgyzstan	0
26 September
Uzbekistan	2
Saudi Arabia	3
26 September
Iraq	4
Tajikistan	2
26 September
North Korea	4
Indonesia	1
26 September
Vietnam	1
United Arab Emirates	3

Quarterfinals
28 September
South Korea	1
Japan	0
28 September
Thailand	2
Jordan	0
28 September
Saudi Arabia	0
Iraq	3
28 September
North Korea	1
United Arab Emirates	0

Semifinals
30 September
South Korea	2
Thailand	0
30 September
Iraq	0
North Korea (a.e.t.)	1

Gold medal match
2 October
South Korea (a.e.t.)	1
North Korea	0
Bronze medal match
2 October
Iraq	1
Thailand	0

=== Round of 16 ===
25 September
17:00

Palestine	0–4	Japan
		Endo 17'; Suzuki 27'; Arano 75'; Harakawa 82'

Hwaseong Stadium, Hwaseong
Referee: Ma Ning (China)

25 September
17:00

Jordan	2–0 (a.e.t.)	Kyrgyzstan
Al-Essawi 110'; Al-Mardi 115'

Incheon Munhak Stadium
Referee: Minoru Tojo (Japan)

25 September
20:00

South Korea	3–0	Hong Kong
Lee Yong-jae 59'; Park Joo-ho 76'; Kim Jin-su 90+3'

Goyang Stadium, Goyang
Referee: Mohamed Al-Zarouni (United Arab Emirates)

25 September
20:00

Thailand	2–0	China
Kraisorn 47', 76'

Wa~ Stadium, Ansan
Referee: Ali Sabah (Iraq)

26 September
16:00

Iraq	4–2	Tajikistan
Tariq 7'; Shaker 47'; Adnan 62'; Nadhim 84'		Vasiev 37'; Fatkhuloev 88'

Football Stadium, Incheon
Referee: Ko Hyung-jin (South Korea)

26 September
16:00

Vietnam	1–3	United Arab Emirates
Nguyễn Huy Hùng 87'		Al-Kathiri 21'; Khalfan 60'; Al-Ahbabi 90+3'

Hwaseong Stadium, Hwaseong
Referee: Timur Faizullin (Kyrgyzstan)

26 September
20:00

Uzbekistan	2–3	Saudi Arabia
Iskanderov 45+1'; Shodiev 70'		Al-Ghamdi 17' (pen.); Yuldashov 54' (o.g.); Al-Bishi 90+5'

Goyang Stadium, Goyang
Referee: Chaiya Mahapab (Thailand)

26 September
20:00

North Korea	4–1	Indonesia
Pak Kwang-ryong 19'; Jo Kwang 40'; Jong Il-gwan 41', 66'		Utomo 60'

Wa~ Stadium, Ansan
Referee: Khamis Al-Marri (Qatar)

=== Quarterfinals ===
28 September
14:00

Thailand	2–0	Jordan
Songkrasin 37'; Thaweekarn 71'

Football Stadium, Incheon
Referee: Çarymyrat Kurbanow (Turkmenistan)

28 September
14:00

North Korea	1–0	United Arab Emirates
Jong Il-gwan 90+2'

Hwaseong Stadium, Hwaseong
Referee: Yu Ming-hsun (Chinese Taipei)

28 September
17:00

South Korea	1–0	Japan
Jang Hyun-soo 88' (pen.)

Incheon Munhak Stadium
Referee: Marai Al-Awaji (Saudi Arabia)

28 September
17:00

Saudi Arabia	0–3	Iraq
		Mahmoud 10', 29'; Al-Shamekh 49' (o.g.)

Goyang Stadium, Goyang
Referee: Ahmed Al-Kaf (Oman)

=== Semifinals ===
30 September
17:00

Iraq	0–1 (a.e.t.)	North Korea
		Jong Il-gwan 96'

Football Stadium, Incheon
Referee: Ma Ning (China)

30 September
20:00

South Korea	2–0	Thailand
Lee Jong-ho 41'; Jang Hyun-soo 45+1' (pen.)

Munhak Stadium, Incheon
Referee: Mohamed Al-Zarouni (United Arab Emirates)

=== Bronze medal match ===
2 October
17:00

Thailand	0–1	Iraq
		Mahmoud 62'

Football Stadium, Incheon
Referee: Ko Hyung-jin (South Korea)

=== Gold medal match ===
2 October
20:00

South Korea	1–0 (a.e.t.)	North Korea
Rim Chang-woo 120+1'

Munhak Stadium, Incheon
Referee: Abdullah Balideh (Qatar)

== Goalscorers ==
6 goals

- Ferdinand Sinaga (INA)

5 goals

- Musashi Suzuki (JPN)
- Jong Il-gwan (PRK)
- Adisak Kraisorn (THA)
- Vokhid Shodiev (UZB)

4 goals

- Younis Mahmoud (IRQ)
- Humam Tariq (IRQ)
- Saeed Al-Kathiri (UAE)

3 goals

- Ali Adnan (IRQ)
- Kim Seung-dae (KOR)
- Sami Al-Sanea (KUW)
- Chanathip Songkrasin (THA)
- Kroekrit Thaweekarn (THA)

2 goals

- Chan Siu Kwan (HKG)
- Lam Hok Hei (HKG)
- Fandi Eko Utomo (INA)
- Shoya Nakajima (JPN)
- Jang Hyun-soo (KOR)
- Lee Jong-ho (KOR)
- Rim Chang-woo (KOR)
- Raed Al-Ghamdi (KSA)
- Majed Kanabah (KSA)
- Mohammed Maraaba (PLE)
- Ahmad Maher Wridat (PLE)
- So Kyong-jin (PRK)
- Shahfiq Ghani (SIN)
- Pinyo Inpinit (THA)
- Siyovush Asrorov (TJK)
- Bandar Al-Ahbabi (UAE)
- Igor Sergeev (UZB)

1 goal

- Zohib Islam Amiri (AFG)
- Mamunul Islam (BAN)
- Aminur Rahman Sajib (BAN)
- Chang Feiya (CHN)
- Christian Annan (HKG)
- Bayu Gatra (INA)
- Ramdani Lestaluhu (INA)
- Novri Setiawan (INA)
- Alfin Tuasalamony (INA)
- Mohsen Mosalman (IRI)
- Morteza Pouraliganji (IRI)
- Ali Bahjat (IRQ)
- Marwan Hussein (IRQ)
- Mustafa Nadhim (IRQ)
- Bashar Resan (IRQ)
- Salam Shaker (IRQ)
- Laith Al-Bashtawi (JOR)
- Ahmad Al-Essawi (JOR)
- Mahmoud Al-Mardi (JOR)
- Yazan Thalji (JOR)
- Takuma Arano (JPN)
- Wataru Endo (JPN)
- Riki Harakawa (JPN)
- Takuya Iwanami (JPN)
- Gakuto Notsuda (JPN)
- Ryota Oshima (JPN)
- Avazbek Otkeev (KGZ)
- Kim Jin-su (KOR)
- Kim Shin-wook (KOR)
- Lee Yong-jae (KOR)
- Park Joo-ho (KOR)
- Abdulaziz Al-Bishi (KSA)
- Abdullah Al-Hafith (KSA)
- Ahmed Al-Shehri (KSA)
- Saleh Al-Shehri (KSA)
- Faisal Ajab Al-Azemi (KUW)
- Fahad Al-Hamdan (KUW)
- Yousef Najaf (KUW)
- Ferris Danial (MAS)
- Nor Farhan Muhammad (MAS)
- Fandi Othman (MAS)
- Aidil Zafuan (MAS)
- Amdhan Ali (MDV)
- Mohamed Irufaan (MDV)
- Moosa Yaamin (MDV)
- Saud Al-Farsi (OMA)
- Hatem Al-Hamhami (OMA)
- Abdulmajid Said (OMA)
- Hilal Musa (PLE)
- Jo Kwang (PRK)
- Pak Kwang-ryong (PRK)
- Ri Hyok-chol (PRK)
- Sim Hyon-jin (PRK)
- Safuwan Baharudin (SIN)
- Faris Ramli (SIN)
- Sahil Suhaimi (SIN)
- Chananan Pombuppha (THA)
- Narubadin Weerawatnodom (THA)
- Jahongir Ergashev (TJK)
- Fatkhullo Fatkhuloev (TJK)
- Dilshod Vasiev (TJK)
- Ricardo Sousa Maia (TLS)
- Diogo Santos Rangel (TLS)
- Saif Khalfan (UAE)
- Jamshid Iskanderov (UZB)
- Egor Krimets (UZB)
- Sardor Rashidov (UZB)
- Farrukh Sayfiev (UZB)
- Mạc Hồng Quân (VIE)
- Ngô Hoàng Thịnh (VIE)
- Nguyễn Huy Hùng (VIE)
- Trần Phi Sơn (VIE)
- Võ Huy Toàn (VIE)
- Vũ Minh Tuấn (VIE)

1 own goal

- Sandesh Jhingan (IND) (against UAE)
- Abdullah Al-Shamekh (KSA) (against IRQ)
- Rohit Chand (NEP) (against IRQ)
- Darwish Mohammed (UAE) (against JOR)
- Boburbek Yuldashov (UZB) (against KSA)

== Final standing ==
Rank	Team	Pld	W	D	L	GF	GA	GD	Pts
1st place, gold medalist(s)	South Korea	7	7	0	0	13	0	+13	21
2nd place, silver medalist(s)	North Korea	6	5	0	1	11	2	+9	15
3rd place, bronze medalist(s)	Iraq	7	6	0	1	18	4	+14	18
4	Thailand	7	5	0	2	15	3	+12	15
5	Japan	5	3	0	2	13	5	+8	9
6	Saudi Arabia	5	3	0	2	9	6	+3	9
7	Jordan	4	3	0	1	5	2	+3	9
8	Uzbekistan	4	2	1	1	11	4	+7	7
9	Hong Kong	4	2	1	1	5	6	−1	7
10	United Arab Emirates	4	2	0	2	8	3	+5	6
11	Indonesia	4	2	0	2	12	10	+2	6
12	Vietnam	3	2	0	1	6	4	+2	6
13	Tajikistan	4	2	0	2	5	6	−1	6
14	Palestine	4	2	0	2	5	7	−2	6
15	Singapore	3	1	1	1	5	5	0	4
16	Kuwait	3	1	0	2	6	7	−1	3
17	Malaysia	3	1	0	2	4	6	−2	3
18	Bangladesh	3	1	0	2	2	5	−3	3
19	China	3	1	0	2	1	5	−4	3
20	Maldives	3	1	0	2	3	8	−5	3
21	Oman	3	0	1	2	3	6	−3	1
22	Iran	2	0	1	1	2	5	−3	1
23	Kyrgyzstan	3	0	1	2	1	4	−3	1
24	Pakistan	2	0	0	2	0	3	−3	0
25	Afghanistan	3	0	0	3	1	8	−7	0
26	India	2	0	0	2	0	7	−7	0
27	Laos	3	0	0	3	0	9	−9	0
28	East Timor	3	0	0	3	2	13	−11	0
29	Nepal	3	0	0	3	0	13	−13	0
