= Alan Martha =

Indonesian footballer (born 1992)

Personal information
- Full name: Alan Martha
- Date of birth: July 22, 1992 (age 34)
- Place of birth: Padang Pariaman, Indonesia
- Height: 1.58 m (5 ft 2 in)
- Position: Forward

Youth career
- 2008–2011: Deportivo Indonesia
- 2013: Sriwijaya U21

Senior career*
Years	Team	Apps	(Gls)
2011–2012	Persija Jakarta	3	(0)
2012	→ Persepam Pamekasan (loan)		
2013	Persepar Palangkaraya		
2013–2015	Sriwijaya	6	(0)
2016	Kalteng Putra	13	(0)
2017	Celebest	4	(0)
2017	Persikad Depok	6	(1)

International career
2007–2008	Indonesia U17	5	(5)
2009	Indonesia U19	5	(2)
- * Club domestic league appearances and goals as of 25 March 2017

Alan Martha (born July 22, 1992) is an Indonesian former footballer who played as a forward.

== International career ==
On November 3, 2007, Alan scored a quart-rick against Vietnam U-17 in the 2008 AFC U-16 Championship qualification.

Alan scored 2 goals for Indonesia U-19 against Chinese Taipei U-19 in a 2010 AFC U-19 Championship qualification match.

== International goals ==
Alan Martha: International under-17 goals

Goal	Date	Venue	Opponent	Score	Result	Competition
1	26 October 2007	Lebak Bulus Stadium, Jakarta, Indonesia	Hong Kong U-17	0–1	0–1	2008 AFC U-16 Championship qualification
2	3 November 2007	Lebak Bulus Stadium, Jakarta, Indonesia	Vietnam U-17	1–1	4–1	2008 AFC U-16 Championship qualification
3	3 November 2007	Lebak Bulus Stadium, Jakarta, Indonesia	Vietnam U-17	2–1	4–1	2008 AFC U-16 Championship qualification
4	3 November 2007	Lebak Bulus Stadium, Jakarta, Indonesia	Vietnam U-17	3–1	4–1	2008 AFC U-16 Championship qualification
5	3 November 2007	Lebak Bulus Stadium, Jakarta, Indonesia	Vietnam U-17	4–1	4–1	2008 AFC U-16 Championship qualification

Alan Martha: International under-19 goals

Goal	Date	Venue	Opponent	Score	Result	Competition
1	12 November 2009	Si Jalak Harupat Stadium, Bandung, Indonesia	Chinese Taipei U-19	0–1	0–6	2010 AFC U-19 Championship qualification
2	12 November 2009	Si Jalak Harupat Stadium, Bandung, Indonesia	Chinese Taipei U-19	0–5	0–6	2010 AFC U-19 Championship qualification

== Honours ==
=== Club ===
Sriwijaya U-21

- Indonesia Super League U-21: 2012–13
