= Thinley Dorji =

Thinley Dorji may refer to:

- Thinley Dorji (footballer)
- Thinley Dorji (archer)
