= Payam Sadeghian =

Iranian footballer

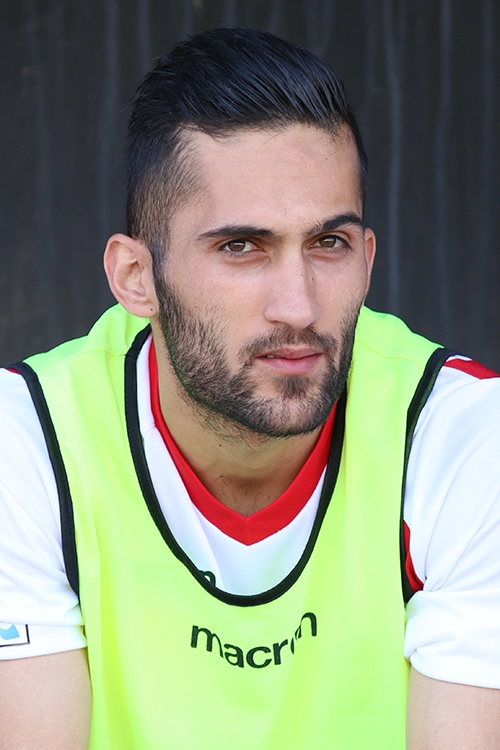
- Sadeghian with Persepolis

Personal information
- Full name: Payam Sadeghian Sharafabad
- Date of birth: 29 February 1992 (age 34)
- Place of birth: Tabriz, Iran
- Height: 1.71 m (5 ft 7 1/2 in)
- Positions: Attacking midfielder; second striker

Youth career
- 2005–2010: Zob Ahan

Senior career*
Years	Team	Apps	(Gls)
2009–2013	Zob Ahan	61	(6)
2013–2015	Persepolis	36	(4)
2015	Naft Tehran	10	(1)
2015–2016	Saba Qom	7	(0)
2016–2017	Machine Sazi	18	(4)
2017–2019	Osmanlıspor	12	(1)
2019	Sepidrood	3	(0)

International career^{‡}
2005–2007	Iran U14	25	(14)
2007–2009	Iran U17	21	(8)
2009–2010	Iran U20	5	(1)
2010–2014	Iran U23	22	(12)
2012–2015	Iran	5	(1)
- * Club domestic league appearances and goals as of 30 December 2018 ‡ National team caps and goals as of 3 March 2014

Payam Sadeghian (Persian: پیام صادقیان; born 29 February 1992) is a retired Iranian footballer.

== Club career ==
=== Zob Ahan ===
Sadeghian showed himself as a starting line-up player first time in 2011–12 IPL and made an assist for Mohammad Hosseini against Foolad. He also scored a goal and made another assist in a match against Malavan. On 9 September 2011, he made another assist for Esmaeil Farhadi against Persepolis. Two weeks later, he played the full 90 minutes against Shahin Bushehr and made an assist for Mohammad Ahmadpouri. He made an assist for Mohammad Ghazi on 2 October 2011 to show his assist ability another time.

=== Persepolis ===
He signed a two-year contract with Persepolis on 9 June 2013. He made his debut in a match against Tractor Sazi as a substitute for Gholamreza Rezaei and made an assist two minutes later for Mehdi Seyed Salehi. In his first season with Persepolis he was instrumental in their success and was one of their most important players. In August 2014 Sadegian was banned three months for shoving a referee during a match against Foolad.

He was fired by Persepolis on 27 April 2015 after a dispute with coach Branko Ivanković.

=== Naft Tehran ===
On 1 July 2015, Sadeghian joined Naft Tehran on a five-year contract. He scored his first goal for the club on 27 October 2015 in a 2–1 victory against Padideh.

=== Saba Qom ===
After falling out with the management at Naft, Sadeghian left the club and on 8 January 2016 he signed with Saba Qom and reunited with former coach Ali Daei.

=== Machine Sazi ===
On 28 May 2016, Sadeghian signed with newly promoted Tabrizi side Machine Sazi. This club also is his father's (Hassan Sadeghian) team. Sadeghian assisted in his first match for the club against Foolad.

=== Osmanlıspor ===
On 30 August 2017, Sadeghian signed a three–year contract with Turkish club Osmanlıspor. On 4 November 2017, Sadeghian made his first appearance for the club in a match against Fenerbahce, coming on as a second-half substitute and immediately contributing an assist. Sadeghian made his second appearance on 28 November 2017 in a Turkish Cup match, he played 85 minutes and recorded two assist. In his first five matches for the club, Payam recorded four assists. Three in the cup and one in the league.

Sadeghian scored his first goal for the club on 3 March 2018 from a penalty kick against Kasimpasa.

== International career ==
=== Under-17 ===
He captained the team to the championship for the first time in the 2008 AFC U-16 Championship. At the tournament he played in all the games apart from the final due to suspension. He scored Iran's first goal at the tournament against Bahrain. Winning the tournament qualified Iran for the 2009 FIFA U-17 World Cup, Sadeghian again scored Iran's first goal at the tournament against Gambia in the 44th minute making the most from a poorly taken free kick from the goalkeeper. He played a key role in Iran's qualification from its group, unbeaten with 7 points.

=== Under-20 ===
He was again a vital part of Iran's U19's participation at the 2010 AFC U-19 Championship. He played in Iran's first two games, Iran losing both and failing to qualify from its group.

=== Under-22 ===
He was called up by Ali Reza Mansourian to participate in the team's training camp in Italy. During a friendly match against the Italy B team he scored 2 goals in Iran's 6–2, including Iran's first with an outstanding free kick.

=== Senior ===
Sadeghian made his debut for the senior Iran team against Mozambique, as a substitute in 2012. He was called up again to the squad by Carlos Queiroz in March 2014, and played in Iran's match against Kuwait which Iran won 3–2.

== Statistics ==
=== Club ===
As of 30 December 2018.

Club	Division	Season	League			Cup			Continental			Total		
Club	Division	Season	Apps	Goals	Assists	Apps	Goals	Assists	Apps	Goals	Assists	Apps	Goals	Assists
Zob Ahan	Pro League	2009–10	3	1	0	1	0	0	0	0	0	4	1	0
Zob Ahan	Pro League	2010–11	1	0	0	0	0	0	1	0	0	2	0	0
Zob Ahan	Pro League	2011–12	27	2	4	0	0	0	1	0	0	28	2	4
Zob Ahan	Pro League	2012–13	30	3	1	3	0	0	–	–	–	33	3	1
Zob Ahan	Total		61	6	5	4	0	0	2	0	0	67	6	5
Persepolis	Pro League	2013–14	26	3	8	2	0	0	–	–	–	28	3	8
Persepolis	Pro League	2014–15	10	1	0	2	1	0	2	0	0	14	2	0
Persepolis	Total		36	4	8	4	1	0	2	0	0	42	5	8
Naft Tehran	Pro League	2015–16	10	1	2	2	0	0	2	0	0	14	1	2
Saba Qom	Pro League	2015–16	7	0	2	0	0	0	–	–	–	7	0	2
Mashin Sazi	Pro League	2016–17	18	4	5	1	1	0	–	–	–	19	5	5
Osmanlıspor	Süper Lig	2017–18	10	1	1	2	0	3	–	–	–	12	1	4
Osmanlıspor	TFF First League	2018–19	2	0	0	0	0	0	–	–	–	2	0	0
Osmanlıspor	Total		12	1	1	2	0	3	0	0	0	14	1	4
Career total			144	16	21	13	2	3	6	0	0	163	18	24

=== International goals ===
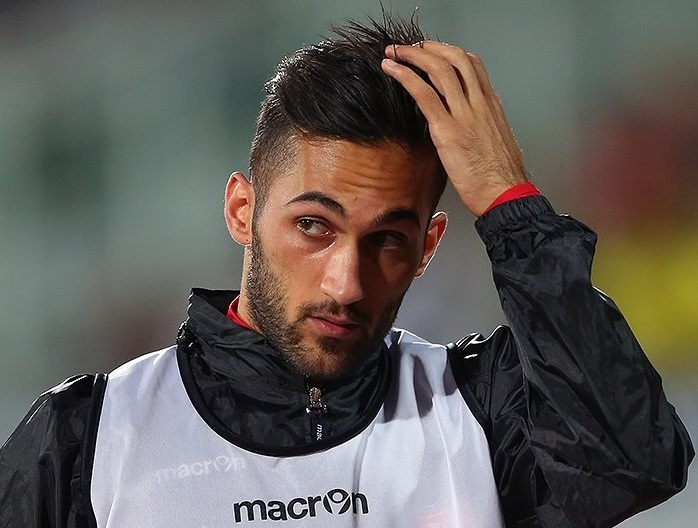
Sadeghian benching during a Hazfi Cup match with Persepolis

==== U17 ====
International U-17 goals
9	25 October 2009	Calabar, Nigeria	Gambia	2–0	Win	2009 FIFA U-17 World Cup
8	10 October 2008	Pakhtakor, Uzbekistan	Bahrain	2–0	Win	2008 AFC U-16 Championship
6	25 October 2007	Tehran, Iran	Nepal	3–0	Win	2008 AFC U-16 Championship qualification
6	25 October 2007	Tehran, Iran	Nepal	3–0	Win	2008 AFC U-16 Championship qualification
5	21 October 2007	Tehran, Iran	Kuwait	3–0	Win	2008 AFC U-16 Championship qualification
4	19 October 2007	Manama, Bahrain	Bahrain	7–0	Win	2008 AFC U-16 Championship qualification
3	19 October 2007	Manama, Bahrain	Bahrain	7–0	Win	2008 AFC U-16 Championship qualification
2	19 October 2007	Manama, Bahrain	Bahrain	7–0	Win	2008 AFC U-16 Championship qualification
1	19 October 2007	Manama, Bahrain	Bahrain	7–0	Win	2008 AFC U-16 Championship qualification

==== U23 ====
International U-23 goals
12	29 December 2013	Kish, Iran	South Korea	3–2	Win	Friendly
11	25 March 2013	Doha, Qatar	Turkey	3–2	Win	Qatar Tournament
10	25 March 2013	Doha, Qatar	Turkey	3–2	Win	Qatar Tournament
9	21 March 2013	Doha, Qatar	Morocco	1–0	Win	Qatar Tournament
8	4 September 2012	Tehran, Iran	Syria	3–1	Win	Friendly
7	4 September 2012	Tehran, Iran	Syria	3–1	Win	Friendly
6	1 July 2012	Malacca, Malaysia	Tajikistan	2–0	Win	2013 AFC U-22 Championship qualification
5	28 June 2012	Malacca, Malaysia	Maldives	7–0	Win	2013 AFC U-22 Championship qualification
4	15 June 2012	Rome, Italy	Greece	4–0	Win	Friendly
3	15 June 2012	Rome, Italy	Greece	4–0	Win	Friendly
2	12 June 2012	Rome, Italy	Italy	6–2	Win	Friendly
1	12 June 2012	Rome, Italy	Italy	6–2	Win	Friendly

==== Senior ====
#	Date	Venue	Opponent	Score	Result	Competition
1	3 March 2014	Enghelab Stadium, Karaj	Kuwait	2–1	3–2	2015 AFC Asian Cup qualification

== Honours ==
=== Club ===
Zob Ahan

- AFC Champions League Runner-up (1): 2010
- Iran Pro League Runner-up (1): 2009–10

Persepolis

- Iran Pro League Runner-up (1): 2013–14

=== International ===
Iran

- AFC U-16 Championship (1): 2008

=== Individual ===
- Persian Gulf Pro League Top Assistant (1): 2013–14
