= Akshay Mall =

Indian footballer (born 1992)

Personal information
- Date of birth: 30 September 1992 (age 34)
- Place of birth: India
- Position: Midfielder

Team information
- Current team: Air India
- Number: 8

Youth career
- Providence

Senior career*
Years	Team	Apps	(Gls)
2010–2012	Pailan Arrows		
2012–	Air India	3	(0)

International career
2007–2008	India U16	4	(2)
- * Club domestic league appearances and goals

Akshay Vilmal Kumar Mall (born 30 September 1992) is an Indian footballer who plays as a midfielder for Air India FC in the I-League.

== Career ==
=== Early Career and Pailan Arrows ===
Mall started playing football from the early age of six in his home state of Gujarat. In 2006 Mall represented his state in the Mir Iqbal Hussain Trophy. Then in 2007 Mall participated in the Kanga Cup which is a tournament based in Canberra, Australia for his club Providence FC who are based in Vadodara in his home state of Gujarat in which after the tournament he was adjudged the Player of the Tournament for under-15 players.

In 2010 Mall rejected the chance to sign for Indian football giants East Bengal F.C. due to the "politics at the club" and instead decided to sign with the Pailan Arrows (then AIFF XI) who were a starter club in the I-League created by the All India Football Federation so young footballers can gain regular time in India's top league. On 3 December 2010 Mall was part of the first ever AIFF XI I-League 18-man squad that played against Prayag United at the Salt Lake Stadium in which AIFF XI lost 2–1.

=== Air India ===
After two seasons with Pailan Arrows Mall signed with Air India FC who also play in the I-League and he made his debut for the club on 11 October 2012 in a league match against his former club Pailan Arrows at the Salt Lake Stadium in which he came on as an 81st-minute substitute for Micky Fernandes as Air India lost the match 2–1.

== International ==
Mall made his official debut for the India U16s on 7 November 2007 against Bhutan in which he also scored two goals for India's U16s in the 68th and 83rd minutes to help India's U16s to a 4–0 victory and qualification to the 2008 AFC U-16 Championship.

== Career statistics ==
=== Club ===
Statistics accurate as of 12 May 2013

Club	Season	League		Federation Cup		Durand Cup		AFC		Total	
Club	Season	Apps	Goals	Apps	Goals	Apps	Goals	Apps	Goals	Apps	Goals
Air India	2012–13	3	0	0	0	0	0	—	—	3	0
Career total		3	0	0	0	0	0	0	0	3	0
