= Nan Yunqi =

Chinese footballer

南云齐 Nan Yunqi
Personal information
- Date of birth: October 6, 1993 (age 33)
- Place of birth: Dalian, Liaoning, China
- Height: 1.77 m (5 ft 9 1/2 in)
- Position: Forward

Senior career*
Years	Team	Apps	(Gls)
2011–2012	Dalian Shide	1	(0)
2013–2015	Dalian Aerbin	0	(0)
2013	→ Shenyang Shenbei (loan)	16	(4)
2015	→ Dalian Transcendence (loan)	19	(7)
2016	Dalian Transcendence	7	(0)
2017	Dalian Boyang	21	(7)
2018–2020	Nantong Zhiyun	52	(15)
2021-2022	Zibo Cuju	40	(8)
2022	Yunnan Yukun		
2023	Binzhou Huilong	12	(6)
2024	Shijiazhuang Gongfu	15	(0)
2025	Guangxi Union	2	(0)
2025	Guangxi Lanhang	10	(2)
- * Club domestic league appearances and goals as of 1 January 2026

Nan Yunqi (Chinese: 南云齐, born 6 October 1993 in Dalian, Liaoning) is a Chinese football player.

== Club career ==
Nan Yunqi started his professional football career in 2011 when he was promoted to Chinese Super League side Dalian Shide. On 3 November 2012, he made his debut for Dalian Shide in the 2012 Chinese Super League against Guizhou Renhe, coming on as a substitute for Yan Xiangchuang in the 84th minute.

In 2013, Nan transferred to Dalian Aerbin after Dalian Shide dissolved. On 1 March 2013, he moved to China League One side Shenyang Shenbei on a one-year loan deal. On 5 March 2015, Nan was loaned to China League Two side Dalian Transcendence until 31 December 2015. He transferred to Dalian Transcendence in March 2016.

In March 2017, Nan transferred to League Two side Dalian Boyoung. In March 2018, Nan signed for China League Two side Nantong Zhiyun.

== Career statistics ==
Statistics accurate as of match played 1 January 2026.

Appearances and goals by club, season and competition
Club	Season	League			National Cup		Continental		Other		Total	
Club	Season	Division	Apps	Goals	Apps	Goals	Apps	Goals	Apps	Goals	Apps	Goals
Dalian Shide	2011	Chinese Super League	0	0	0	0	-		-		0	0
Dalian Shide	2012	Chinese Super League	1	0	1	0	-		-		2	0
Dalian Shide	Total		1	0	1	0	0	0	0	0	2	0
Dalian Aerbin	2014	Chinese Super League	0	0	1	0	-		-		1	0
Shenyang Shenbei (loan)	2013	China League One	16	4	2	1	-		-		18	5
Dalian Transcendence (loan)	2015	China League Two	19	7	3	1	-		-		22	8
Dalian Transcendence	2016	China League One	7	0	1	0	-		-		8	0
Dalian Boyoung	2017	China League Two	21	7	2	2	-		-		23	9
Nantong Zhiyun	2018	China League Two	25	9	4	0	-		-		29	9
Nantong Zhiyun	2019	China League One	16	5	0	0	-		-		16	5
Nantong Zhiyun	2020	China League One	11	1	-		-		-		11	1
Nantong Zhiyun	Total		52	15	4	0	0	0	0	0	56	15
Zibo Cuju	2021	China League One	30	6	1	1	-		-		31	7
Zibo Cuju	2022	China League One	10	2	0	0	-		-		10	2
Zibo Cuju	Total		40	8	1	1	0	0	0	0	41	9
Yunnan Yukun	2022	CMCL			-		-		-			
Binzhou Huilong	2023	CMCL	12	6	-		-		-		12	6
Shijiazhuang Gongfu	2024	China League One	15	0	2	0	-		-		17	0
Guangxi Union	2025	CMCL	2	0	-		-		-		2	0
Guangxi Lanhang	2025	China League Two	10	2	0	0	-		-		10	2
Career total			195	49	17	5	0	0	0	0	212	54

== International goals ==
=== China U16 ===
No.	Date	Venue	Opponent	Score	Result	Competition
1.	1 October 2007	Hebei, China	Macau	1–0	12–0	2008 AFC U-16 Championship qualification
2.	1 October 2007	Hebei, China	Macau	2–0	12–0	2008 AFC U-16 Championship qualification
3.	1 October 2007	Hebei, China	Macau	5–0	12–0	2008 AFC U-16 Championship qualification
4.	1 October 2007	Hebei, China	Macau	7–0	12–0	2008 AFC U-16 Championship qualification
5.	3 October 2007	Hebei, China	Mongolia	1–0	5–0	2008 AFC U-16 Championship qualification
6.	3 October 2007	Hebei, China	Mongolia	3–0	5–0	2008 AFC U-16 Championship qualification
7.	3 October 2007	Hebei, China	Mongolia	5–0	5–0	2008 AFC U-16 Championship qualification
8.	7 October 2007	Hebei, China	Guam	8–0	9–0	2008 AFC U-16 Championship qualification
9.	9 October 2007	Hebei, China	Singapore	1–1	2–1	2008 AFC U-16 Championship qualification
10.	5 October 2008	Tashkent, Uzbekistan	Turkmenistan	1–1	2–1	2008 AFC U-16 Championship

== Honours ==
Yunnan Yukun

- CMCL: 2022

Shaanxi Chang'an Union

- CMCL play-offs: 2023
