= Lebak Bulus Stadium =

Defunct football stadium in Jakarta, Indonesia

- Persija Last Match in Lebak Bulus Stadium
- Interactive map of Lebak Bulus Stadium
- Location: Jakarta, Indonesia
- Coordinates: 6°17′20.79″S 106°46′36.16″E
- Owner: Government of Jakarta
- Capacity: 12,500
- Surface: Grass

Construction
- Opened: 1987
- Closed: 2013
- Demolished: 2013

Tenant
- Persija Jakarta (1998–2007)

Lebak Bulus Stadium was a football stadium in Jakarta, Indonesia. The stadium had 12,500 seats and can be extended to 15,000 until 25,000 people. It was used mostly for football matches. The stadium held AFC U-17 Championship 2008 Qualification Group F Matches and Football Men's Tournament at the 2011 SEA Games Group B Matches.

The stadium was demolished in 2013 to build a depot for the Jakarta Mass Rapid Transit system. The new stadium, known as the Jakarta International Stadium (JIS), was built at 4.5 hectares, initially in Tanjung Priok, with Rp 580 billion ($62.7 million) fund and located close to nearby railroad and toll road. JIS was opened in 2022, with the exact location in Tanjung Priok, North Jakarta.

== Notable events ==
On 8 July 1992, Brazilian metal band Sepultura performed at the stadium during their 1992 World Arise Tour.

On 10 and 11 April 1993, Metallica performed at the stadium during their Nowhere Else to Roam tour. Attended by more than 40,000 people, the concert is infamous for its mass rioting and looting. The utter havoc was recalled by drummer Lars Ulrich in the documentary film Global Metal.
