= Ahmad Al Kaddour =

Syrian footballer (born 1993)

Ahmad Al Kaddour أحمد القدور
Personal information
- Full name: Amad Ahmad Al Kaddour
- Date of birth: 4 January 1993 (age 33)
- Place of birth: Aleppo, Syria
- Height: 1.81 m (5 ft 11 1/2 in)
- Position: Forward

Team information
- Current team: Al-Baqa'a

Youth career
- Al-Horriya
- 2010–2012: Al Shorta

Senior career*
Years	Team	Apps	(Gls)
2012–2013	Al Shorta		
2013	Churchill Brothers	4	(0)
2013–2014	Al Wahda	18	(3)
2014	Al-Baqa'a	6	(0)
2015	Al Wahda		
2015–2016	Al-Karamah		
2016	Erbil SC		
2017–	Al Salibikhaet	10	(8)

International career
2007–2008	Syria U-17		
2009–2012	Syria U-20		
2012–	Syria U-22		
- * Club domestic league appearances and goals as of 6 December 2013

Amad Ahmad Al Kaddour (born 4 January 1993) is a Syrian professional footballer, who currently plays for Al Salibikhaet in the Kuwaiti Premier League.

== Career ==
=== Al Shorta ===
For the 2012–13 season, Ahmad played for Al Shorta for which he scored once in the league against Hutteen SC on 20 February 2013 in which he found the net in the 14th minute as his club won 2–0.

=== Churchill Brothers ===
Kaddour made his professional debut for Churchill Brothers in the I-League on 21 September 2013 against Salgaocar at the Duler Stadium; as Churchill Brothers lost the match 1–0. Syrian striker has been released by defending I-League champions after failing to impress in the four games.

=== Al Wahda ===
In December 2013 Al Kaddour joined 2013 Syrian Cup winners Al Wahda of the Syrian Premier League. On February 10, 2014 he scored his first goal in the League match against Al-Muhafaza, which his team won 3-1.

=== Al-Baqa'a ===
He joined Al-Baqa'a in August 2014.

== International career ==
Ahmad represented the national team in 2012 AFC U-19 Championship. In the Quarter-finals against Uzbekistan he missed a penalty in the tie-breaker.

== Career statistics ==
As of 6 December 2013

Club	Season	League			Federation Cup		Durand Cup		AFC		Total	
Club	Season	Division	Apps	Goals	Apps	Goals	Apps	Goals	Apps	Goals	Apps	Goals
Churchill Brothers	2013–14	I-League	4	0	0	0	—	—	—	—	4	0
Career total			4	0	0	0	0	0	0	0	4	0
