= Sun Dong (footballer) =

Chinese association football player

Personal information
- Date of birth: 3 January 1992 (age 34)
- Place of birth: Dalian, Liaoning, China
- Height: 1.75 m (5 ft 9 in)
- Position: Midfielder

Team information
- Current team: Jiangxi Beidamen
- Number: 27

Youth career
- –2013: Shandong Taishan

Senior career*
Years	Team	Apps	(Gls)
2013	Shandong Taishan	0	(0)
2014	Shandong Tengding		
2016–2023	Jiangxi Beidamen	107	(11)
Total		107	(11)
- * Club domestic league appearances and goals as of 14:01, 24 August 2021 (UTC)

Sun Dong (Chinese: 孙冬; born 3 January 1992) is a Chinese footballer currently playing as a midfielder for Jiangxi Beidamen.

On 10 September 2024, Chinese Football Association announced that Sun was banned from football-related activities for lifetime for involving in match-fixing.

== Career statistics ==
=== Club ===
As of 30 November 2022.

Club	Season	League			Cup		Other		Total	
Club	Season	Division	Apps	Goals	Apps	Goals	Apps	Goals	Apps	Goals
Shandong Taishan	2013	Chinese Super League	0	0	1 (Note: Appearances in the Chinese FA Cup)	0	–		1	0
Jiangxi Liansheng/ Jiangxi Beidamen	2016	China League Two	18	0	1	0	5 (Note: Appearances in the China League Two playoffs)	0	24	0
Jiangxi Liansheng/ Jiangxi Beidamen	2017	China League Two	19	1	1	0	0	0	20	1
Jiangxi Liansheng/ Jiangxi Beidamen	2018	China League Two	19	3	0	0	1	0	20	3
Jiangxi Liansheng/ Jiangxi Beidamen	2019	China League Two	21	3	2	1	3	0	26	4
Jiangxi Liansheng/ Jiangxi Beidamen	2020	China League One	7	1	0	0	1 (Note: Appearances in the China League One relegation playoffs)	0	8	1
Jiangxi Liansheng/ Jiangxi Beidamen	2021	China League One	10	1	0	0	–		10	1
Jiangxi Liansheng/ Jiangxi Beidamen	2022	China League One	13	2	1	1	–		14	3
Jiangxi Liansheng/ Jiangxi Beidamen	Total		107	11	5	2	10	0	122	13
Career total			107	11	6	2	10	0	123	13
