= Takuto Haraguchi =

Japanese footballer

Takuto Haraguchi 原口拓人
Personal information
- Full name: Takuto Haraguchi
- Date of birth: 3 May 1992 (age 34)
- Place of birth: Kawanishi, Hyōgo, Japan
- Height: 1.73 m (5 ft 8 in)
- Position: Forward

Team information
- Current team: Veertien Mie
- Number: 34

Youth career
- 2004–2010: Gamba Osaka Youth
- 2011–2014: Kansai University FC

Senior career*
| Years | Team | Apps | (Gls) |
| 2015–2016 | Renofa Yamaguchi | 29 | (3) |
| 2017–2018 | Gainare Tottori | 17 | (1) |
| 2019– | Veertien Mie | 14 | (1) |
- * Club domestic league appearances and goals as of 23 December 2019

Takuto Haraguchi (原口 拓人, Haraguchi Takuto; born 3 May 1992) is a Japanese footballer who plays for Veertien Mie.

== Club statistics ==
Updated to 23 December 2019.

| Club performance | | | League | | Cup | | Total | |
| Season | Club | League | Apps | Goals | Apps | Goals | Apps | Goals |
| Japan | | | League | | Emperor's Cup | | Total | |
|---|---|---|---|---|---|---|---|---|
| 2015 | Renofa Yamaguchi | J3 League | 19 | 2 | 1 | 0 | 20 | 2 |
| 2016 | Renofa Yamaguchi | J2 League | 10 | 1 | 0 | 0 | 10 | 1 |
| 2017 | Gainare Tottori | J3 League | 17 | 1 | 1 | 0 | 18 | 1 |
| 2018 | Gainare Tottori | J3 League | 0 | 0 | 0 | 0 | 0 | 0 |
| 2019 | Veertien Mie | JFL | 14 | 1 | 1 | 0 | 15 | 1 |
| Career total | | | 60 | 5 | 3 | 0 | 63 | 5 |
