= Mehrdad Yeghaneh =

Iranian footballer

Personal information
- Full name: Mehrdad Yeghaneh
- Date of birth: 22 January 1992 (age 34)
- Place of birth: Tabriz, Iran
- Position: Defender

Team information
- Current team: Niroye Zamini

Youth career
- 2005–2009: Tractor
- 2009–2010: Sepahan

Senior career*
Years	Team	Apps	(Gls)
2010–2012	Gostaresh Foulad		
2012–2014	Paykan		
2014–2016	Niroye Zamini		

International career
2006–2009	Iran U17		
- * Club domestic league appearances and goals

Mehrdad Yeghaneh (Persian: مهرداد يگانه; born 22 January 1992) is an Iranian footballer for Niroye Zamini in the Azadegan League as a defender. He previously played in the Iran Pro League and Paykan F.C. team. Yeghaneh was with the youth national team of the AFC U-16 Championship, went to 2009 FIFA U-17 World Cup and with the national team until the ascent 1/16.

== International ==
Iran U-17

- AFC U-16 Championship (1): 2008
