= Yuta Ito =

Japanese footballer

Yuta Ito 伊藤 優汰
Personal information
- Full name: Yuta Ito
- Date of birth: September 18, 1992 (age 34)
- Place of birth: Nagoya, Aichi, Japan
- Height: 1.72 m (5 ft 7 1/2 in)
- Position: Midfielder

Team information
- Current team: Moriyama Samurai 2000

Youth career
- 2005–2010: Kyoto Sanga Youth

Senior career*
Years	Team	Apps	(Gls)
2011–2015	Kyoto Sanga	73	(9)
2013	→ Ehime FC (loan)	6	(0)
2016–2018	Albirex Niigata	29	(1)
2019	Kataller Toyama	11	(1)
2020	Aventura Kawaguchi		
2021–	Moriyama Samurai 2000		
- * Club domestic league appearances and goals as of 19:02, 24 January 2021 (UTC)

Yuta Ito (伊藤 優汰, Itō Yūta; born September 18, 1992) is a Japanese footballer who plays as a winger for Moriyama Samurai 2000.

== Club career ==
Born in Nagoya, Ito made his senior debut for Kyoto Sanga during the 2011 season. He signed a contract extension with the club in September 2011, and spent the 2013 on loan at Ehime. He moved to Albirex Niigata in January 2016. He joined Aventura Kawaguchi after a small stint with Kataller Toyama in March 2020.

== Career statistics ==
Updated to 23 February 2020.

Appearances and goals by club, season and competition
Club	Season	League			Emperor's Cup		J.League Cup		Total	
Club	Season	Division	Apps	Goals	Apps	Goals	Apps	Goals	Apps	Goals
Kyoto Sanga	2011	J2 League	20	3	1	0	—		21	3
Kyoto Sanga	2012	J2 League	10	1	0	0	—		10	1
Ehime FC	2013	J2 League	6	0	0	0	—		6	0
Kyoto Sanga	2014	J2 League	14	1	2	0	—		16	1
Kyoto Sanga	2015	J2 League	29	4	1	0	—		30	4
Albirex Niigata	2016	J1 League	18	1	1	0	4	1	23	2
Albirex Niigata	2017	J1 League	7	0	1	0	2	0	10	0
Albirex Niigata	2018	J2 League	4	0	1	0	4	0	9	0
Kataller Toyama	2019	J3 League	11	1	2	0	—		13	1
Career total			104	10	6	0	6	1	116	11
