= Cần Giuộc =

Cần Giuộc Phường Cần Giuộc
- Ward
- Cần Giuộc ward
- Location within Vietnam
- Coordinates: 10°36′22″N 106°40′16″E
- Country: Vietnam
- Region: Mekong Delta
- Province: Tây Ninh
- Time zone: UTC+7 (UTC + 7)

Cần Giuộc is a ward (phường) of Tây Ninh Province, Vietnam.
