= Kim Dong-jin (footballer, born 1992) =

South Korean footballer

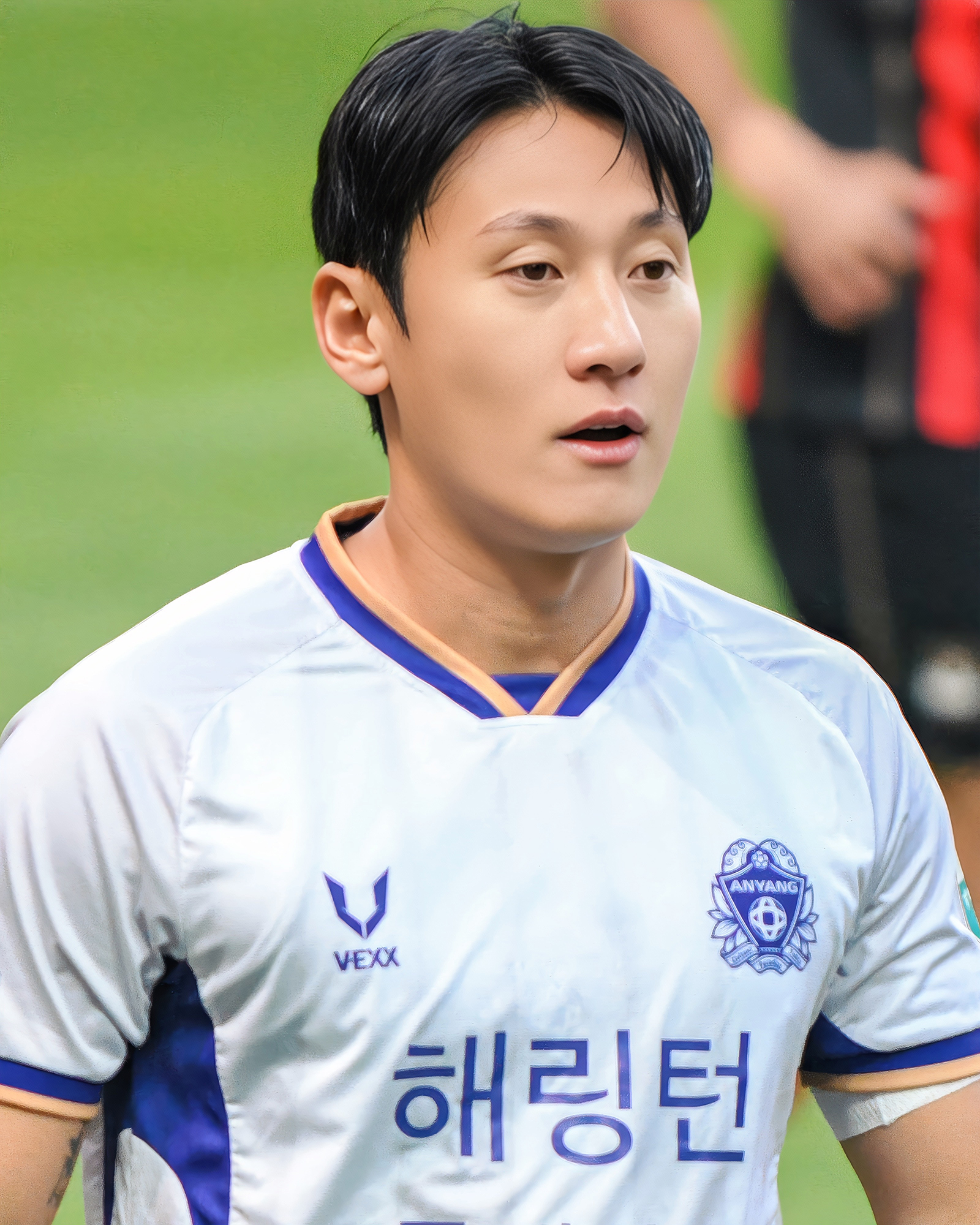
- Kim in 2026

Personal information
- Date of birth: 28 December 1992 (age 33)
- Place of birth: South Korea
- Height: 1.78 m (5 ft 10 in)
- Position: Defender

Team information
- Current team: FC Anyang
- Number: 22

Youth career
- 2011–2013: Ajou University

Senior career*
Years	Team	Apps	(Gls)
2014–2020	Daegu FC	109	(1)
2018–2019	→ Asan Mugunghwa (army)	32	(0)
2021	Gyeongnam FC	35	(2)
2022-	FC Anyang	136	(14)

International career
2008–2009	South Korea U-17		
- * Club domestic league appearances and goals as of 3 August 2026

Kim Dong-jin (Korean: 김동진; born 28 December 1992) is a South Korean footballer who plays as defender for FC Anyang in K League 1.

== Career ==
He was selected by Daegu FC in the 2014 K League draft.
