= Darwish Mohammed =

Emirati footballer (born 1993)

Personal information
- Full name: Darwish Jumaa Mohammed
- Date of birth: 8 January 1993 (age 33)
- Place of birth: United Arab Emirates
- Height: 1.70 m (5 ft 7 in)
- Position: Left back

Youth career
- 2007–2009: Dubai
- 2009–2012: Al-Ahli

Senior career*
Years	Team	Apps	(Gls)
2012–2014	Al-Ahli		
2014–2018	Baniyas		
2018–2020	Dibba Al-Fujairah		
2020–2021	Khor Fakkan		
2021	Hatta		
2022–2023	Al Jazirah Al-Hamra		
2023–2024	Al Rams		
- * Club domestic league appearances and goals

Darwish Mohammed (Arabic: درويش محمد; born 8 January 1993) is an Emirati footballer who plays as a left back.
