= Bahram Dabbagh =

Iranian football midfielder

Bahram Dabagh
Personal information
- Full name: Bahram Dabagh
- Date of birth: July 24, 1992 (age 34)
- Place of birth: Azarshahr, Iran
- Height: 1.70 m (5 ft 7 in)
- Position: Midfielder

Team information
- Current team: Nassaji Mazandaran

Youth career
- –2012: Tractor

Senior career*
Years	Team	Apps	(Gls)
2009–2012	Tractor	0	(0)
2012–2013	Paykan	9	(0)
2013–2015	Naft Tehran	5	(0)
2015–2016	Nassaji Mazandaran	0	(0)
2016-2017	Mantagheh Azad	0	(0)
2017-2018	Sanaye Talaei	7	(0)

International career
2008–2009	Iran U17	5	(1)
2010–2011	Iran U20	3	(0)
2012–2014	Iran U22	3	(1)
- * Club domestic league appearances and goals as of 11 December 2014

Bahram Dabbagh (Persian: بهرام دباغ; born July 24, 1992) is an Iranian former professional football midfielder

== Career ==
Dabbagh joined Paykan in 2012.

== Club career statistics ==
As of 11 June 2015

Club performance			League		Cup		Continental		Total	
Season	Club	League	Apps	Goals	Apps	Goals	Apps	Goals	Apps	Goals
Iran			League		Hazfi Cup		Asia		Total	
2009–10	Tractor	Pro League	0	0	1	1	–		1	1
2010–11	Tractor	Pro League	0	0			–			
2011–12	Tractor	Pro League	0	0			–			
2012–13	Paykan	Pro League	1	0	0	0	–		1	0
2013–14	Naft Tehran	Pro League	2	0	1	0	–		3	0
2013–14	Naft Tehran	Pro League	3	0	2	0	0	0	5	0
2014–15	Naft Tehran	Pro League	2	0	0	0	0	0	2	0
Career total			8	0			0	0		

== International career ==
=== U 17 ===
Dabbagh played Iran national under-17 football team winning the Asian U-16 Championship in 2008 starting 5 of the six games.

=== U 19 ===
He was again a vital part of Iran's U19's participating at the 2010 AFC U-19 Championship, he played in Iran's first to games, Iran losing both and failing to qualify from its group.

=== U 22 ===
He was called up by Ali Reza Mansourian to participate in the team's training camp in Italy.
