= Lee Jong-ho (footballer, born 1992) =

South Korean footballer

Personal information
- Date of birth: 24 February 1992 (age 34)
- Place of birth: Suncheon, South Korea
- Height: 1.80 m (5 ft 11 in)
- Position: Forward

Youth career
- 2008–2010: Jeonnam Dragons

Senior career*
Years	Team	Apps	(Gls)
2011–2015	Jeonnam Dragons	145	(36)
2016	Jeonbuk Hyundai Motors	22	(5)
2017–2018	Ulsan Hyundai	37	(8)
2019	→ V-Varen Nagasaki (loan)	13	(1)
2020–2021	Jeonnam Dragons	46	(12)
2022–2023	Seongnam FC	42	(7)
Total		305	(69)

International career
2007–2009	South Korea U17	25 (Note: Includes three appearances and two goals against clubs.)	(15)
2010–2011	South Korea U20	12	(2)
2013–2014	South Korea U23	7	(4)
2015	South Korea	2	(1)
Medal record
Representing South Korea
Men's football
Asian Games
Gold medal – first place	2014 Incheon
AFC U-16 Championship
Runner-up	2008 Uzbekistan
EAFF Championship
Winner	2015 China
- * Club domestic league appearances and goals

- Lee Jong-ho
- Hangul: 이종호
- Hanja: 李宗浩
- RR: I Jongho
- MR: I Chongho

Lee Jong-ho (Korean: 이종호; born 24 February 1992) is a South Korean former professional footballer who played as a forward.

== Club career ==
Lee attended Gwangyang Jecheol High School, which had the under-18 club of Jeonnam Dragons. Known for his aggressive movement and accurate shot, he was nicknamed the "Gwangyang Rooney" during his schooldays. After graduating from high school, Lee signed a three-year contract with senior team on 24 February 2011. He made his Jeonnam debut in a 1–0 win over Jeonbuk Hyundai Motors at the K League on 6 March 2011, coming on as a substitute for Nam Joon-jae. He played as a main player for the club since 2012, and became the club's top goalscorer with 12 goals in 2015.

After moving to Jeonbuk Hyundai Motors in 2016, Lee won the 2016 AFC Champions League, and scored a goal against Mamelodi Sundowns at the 2016 FIFA Club World Cup. However, he was not a main player at Jeonbuk, and left for Ulsan Hyundai to get more time on the field. He led Ulsan's 2–1 first leg win by having one goal and one assist in the 2017 Korean FA Cup final against Busan IPark. His club won its first Korean FA Cup title after the second leg ended in a goalless draw, but he suffered a fractured tibia in the middle of the match. He could play only three matches in 2018 due to the injury, and transferred to J2 League club V-Varen Nagasaki the next year.

In 2020, Lee returned to Jeonnam Dragons relegated to the K League 2 at the time. While captaining Jeonnam in 2021, he scored nine goals in 32 matches and helped his club win the 2021 Korean FA Cup. Despite these performances, he left the club without a contract extension before the 2022 season. Lastly, he played for Seongnam FC for two years before announcing his retirement on 12 March 2024.

== International career ==
Lee provided three assists as well as scoring a hat-trick against Indonesia, while he led South Korea to the 2008 AFC U-16 Championship final. South Korea lost 2–1 to Iran in the final, but he received the Most Valuable Player award after the match. He also scored two goals at the 2009 FIFA U-17 World Cup.

Lee scored a goal after avoiding opponents' goalkeeper with his exquisite ball control in a 2–0 win over China at the 2015 EAFF Championship, where he made his senior international debut.

== Career statistics ==
=== Club ===
Appearances and goals by club, season and competition
Club	Season	League			National cup		League cup		Continental		Other		Total	
Club	Season	Division	Apps	Goals	Apps	Goals	Apps	Goals	Apps	Goals	Apps	Goals	Apps	Goals
Jeonnam Dragons	2011	K League	18	2	1	0	3	0	—		—		22	2
Jeonnam Dragons	2012	K League	33	6	1	0	—		—		—		34	6
Jeonnam Dragons	2013	K League 1	32	6	0	0	—		—		—		32	6
Jeonnam Dragons	2014	K League 1	31	10	1	0	—		—		—		32	10
Jeonnam Dragons	2015	K League 1	31	12	3	2	—		—		—		34	14
Jeonnam Dragons	Total		145	36	6	2	3	0	—		—		154	38
Jeonbuk Hyundai Motors	2016	K League 1	22	5	3	3	—		5	1	1 (Note: Appearance in FIFA Club World Cup)	1	31	10
Ulsan Hyundai	2017	K League 1	34	8	6	2	—		6	1	—		46	11
Ulsan Hyundai	2018	K League 1	3	0	0	0	—		—		—		3	0
Ulsan Hyundai	Total		37	8	6	2	—		6	1	—		49	11
V-Varen Nagasaki	2019	J2 League	13	1	2	1	5	1	—		—		20	3
Jeonnam Dragons	2020	K League 2	19	4	2	1	—		—		—		21	5
Jeonnam Dragons	2021	K League 2	27	8	4	1	—		—		1 (Note: Appearance in K League 2 promotion play-offs)	0	32	9
Jeonnam Dragons	Total		46	12	6	2	—		—		1	0	53	14
Seongnam FC	2022	K League 1	14	0	0	0	—		—		—		14	0
Seongnam FC	2023	K League 2	28	7	0	0	—		—		—		28	7
Seongnam FC	Total		42	7	0	0	—		—		—		42	7
Career total			305	69	23	10	8	1	11	2	2	1	349	83

=== International ===
List of international goals scored by Lee Jong-ho
No.	Date	Venue	Opponent	Score	Result	Competition
1	2 August 2015	Wuhan Sports Center Stadium, Wuhan, China	China	2–0	2–0	2015 EAFF Championship

== Honours ==
Jeonbuk Hyundai Motors

- AFC Champions League: 2016

Ulsan Hyundai

- Korean FA Cup: 2017

Jeonnam Dragons

- Korean FA Cup: 2021

South Korea U17

- AFC U-16 Championship runner-up: 2008

South Korea U23

- Asian Games: 2014

South Korea

- EAFF Championship: 2015

Individual

- AFC U-16 Championship Most Valuable Player: 2008
- K League All-Star: 2014, 2015
