= Võ Minh Trí =

Vietnamese football referee

- Full name: Võ Minh Trí
- Born: April 3, 1972 (age 54); Cần Giuộc, Long An, Vietnam

Domestic
Years	League	Role
1997–2017	V-League	Referee

International
Years	League	Role
2001–2017	FIFA listed	Referee

Võ Minh Trí (Cần Giuộc, April 3, 1972) is a retired Vietnamese football referee who had been a full international referee for FIFA.

He was chosen as the V-League Referee of the Year in 2010. He was officiated at the 2010 AFF Suzuki Cup, 2014 FIFA World Cup qualification, 2015 SAFF Championship.

To date, he is the only high profile Vietnamese referee to have officiated in several international competitions.
