= Rim Chang-woo =

South Korean footballer

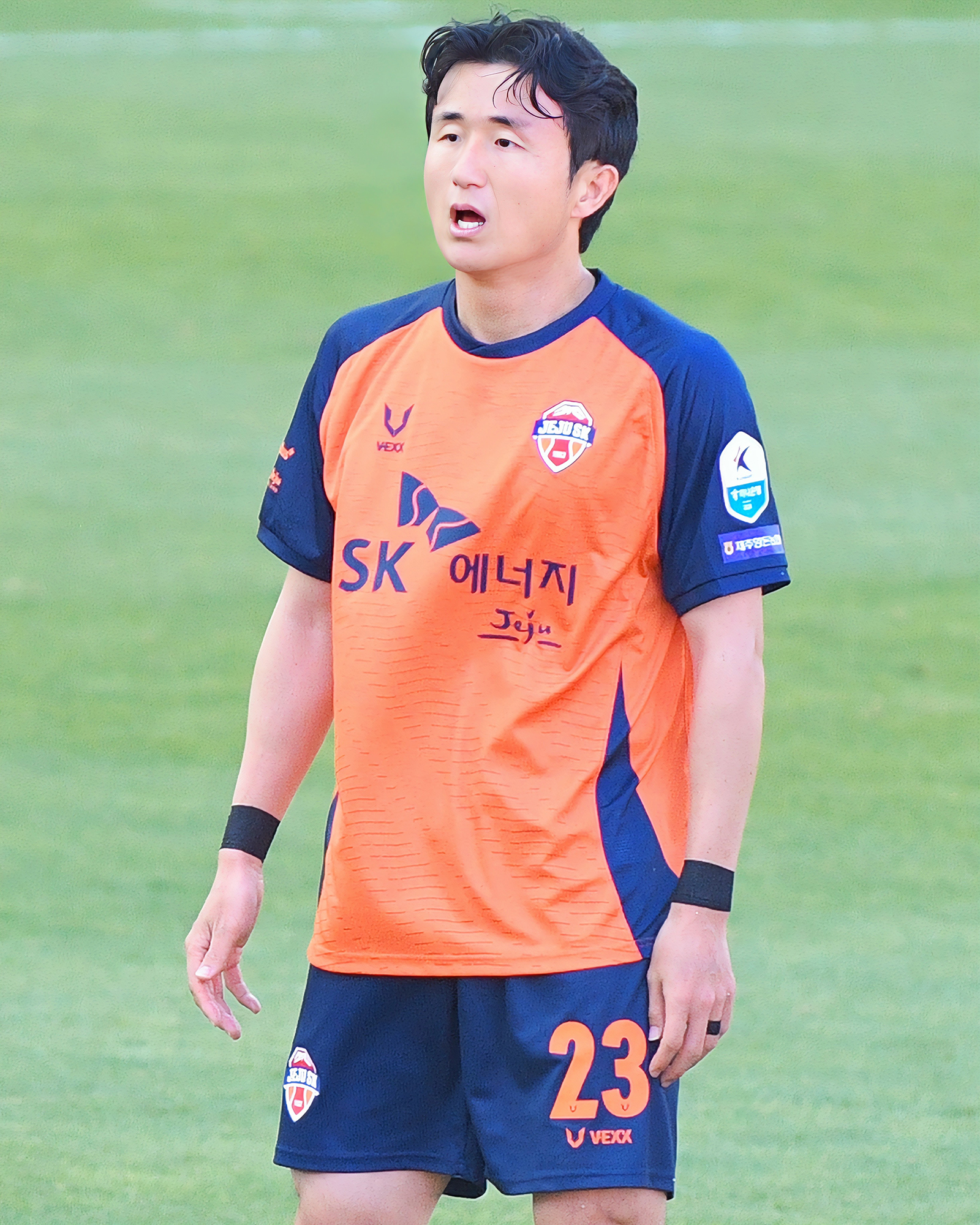
- Rim in 2026

Personal information
- Date of birth: 13 February 1992 (age 34)
- Place of birth: Jeju City, South Korea
- Height: 1.83 m (6 ft 0 in)
- Position: Centre back

Team information
- Current team: Jeju United
- Number: 23

Youth career
- 2007–2009: Hyundai High School

Senior career*
Years	Team	Apps	(Gls)
2010–2015	Ulsan Hyundai	33	(1)
2014	→ Daejeon Citizen (loan)	28	(2)
2016–2020	Al-Wahda	99	(7)
2021–2023	Gangwon FC	78	(3)
2023–	Jeju United	63	(2)

International career^{‡}
2007–2009	South Korea U-17	26	(9)
2011	South Korea U-20	6	(0)
2014	South Korea U-23	12	(3)
2015–	South Korea	6	(0)
Medal record
Representing South Korea
Asian Games
Gold medal – first place	2014 Incheon	Team
- * Club domestic league appearances and goals as of 3 August 2026 ‡ National team caps and goals as of 10 October 2017

- Rim Chang-woo
- Hangul: 임창우
- Hanja: 任倉佑
- RR: Im Changu
- MR: Im Ch'angu

Rim Chang-woo (Korean: 임창우; Korean pronunciation: [im.tɕʰaŋ.u]; born 13 February 1992) is a South Korean footballer who plays as centre back.

== Career ==
He was selected by Ulsan Hyundai in the 2010 K-League Draft. He made his K-League debut match against Jeonbuk Hyundai on 17 October 2012. In January 2016 he joined Al-Wahda of the UAE Pro League.

== International career ==
In 2014, he represented South Korea at the 2014 Asian Games and scored the winning goal against North Korea in the final late into extra time. Rim made his senior debut against China at the 2015 EAFF East Asian Cup.

== Career statistics ==
As of 25 November 2023

Appearances and goals by club, season and competition
Club	Season	League			National cup		League cup		Continental		Other		Total	
Club	Season	Division	Apps	Goals	Apps	Goals	Apps	Goals	Apps	Goals	Apps	Goals	Apps	Goals
Ulsan Hyundai	2010	K League Classic	0	0	0	0	0	0	—		—		0	0
Ulsan Hyundai	2011	K League Classic	0	0	0	0	0	0	—		—		0	0
Ulsan Hyundai	2012	K League Classic	6	0	0	0	—		0	0	—		6	0
Ulsan Hyundai	2013	K League Classic	0	0	1	0	—		—		0	0	1	0
Ulsan Hyundai	2015	K League Classic	27	1	4	0	—		—		—		31	1
Ulsan Hyundai	Total		33	1	5	0	0	0	0	0	0	0	38	1
Daejeon Citizen (loan)	2014	K League Challenge	28	2	0	0	—		—		—		28	2
Al-Wahda	2015–16	UAE Pro League	12	1	0	0	1	0	—		—		13	1
Al-Wahda	2016–17	UAE Pro League	22	3	4	0	5	0	7	1	—		38	4
Al-Wahda	2017–18	UAE Pro League	22	2	3	0	9	0	5	0	1	0	40	2
Al-Wahda	2018–19	UAE Pro League	24	1	1	0	8	0	6	0	1	0	40	1
Al-Wahda	2019–20	UAE Pro League	19	0	1	0	7	0	4	1	—		31	1
Al-Wahda	Total		99	7	9	0	30	0	22	2	2	0	99	9
Gangwon FC	2021	K League 1	28	1	4	1	—		—		2	0	34	2
Gangwon FC	2022	K League 1	37	2	2	0	—		—		—		39	2
Gangwon FC	2023	K League 1	13	0	3	0	—		—		—		16	0
Gangwon FC	Total		78	3	9	1	—		—		2	0	89	4
Jeju United	2023	K League 1	8	0	1	0	—		—		—		9	0
Career total			245	13	24	1	30	0	22	2	4	0	325	16

== Honours ==
Club

Al Wahda FC

- President’s Cup: 2016-17
- UAE League Cup: 2015–16, 2017-18
- Super Cup: 2017, 2018

International

South Korea U23

- Asian Games: 2014

South Korea

- EAFF East Asian Cup: 2015
