= Thinley Dorji (footballer) =

Bhutanese professional footballer

Personal information
- Full name: Thinley Dorji
- Date of birth: 5 May 1995 (age 31)
- Place of birth: Bhutan
- Position: Midfielder

Team information
- Current team: Yeedzin

Senior career*
| Years | Team | Apps | (Gls) |
| 2012– | Yeedzin | | |

International career
| 2011– | Bhutan | 3 | (0) |
- * Club domestic league appearances and goals

Thinley Dorji (born 5 May 1995) is a Bhutanese professional footballer, currently playing for Yeedzin. He made his first appearance for the Bhutan national football team in 2012.
