= Guo Yi (footballer) =

Chinese footballer (born 1993)

Guo Yi 郭毅
Personal information
- Date of birth: 29 January 1993 (age 33)
- Place of birth: Liuzhou, Guangxi, China
- Height: 1.73 m (5 ft 8 in)
- Position: Left winger

Team information
- Current team: Hubei Istar
- Number: 7

Youth career
- Shenzhen Yantian Sports School
- 2010–2012: Boavista

Senior career*
Years	Team	Apps	(Gls)
2012	Boavista	1	(0)
2012–2014	Marítimo	0	(0)
2012–2013	→ Marítimo B (loan)	1	(0)
2014	→ Tondela (loan)	1	(0)
2014–2015	Gondomar	25	(3)
2015–2016	Leixões	12	(0)
2016–2018	Tianjin Teda	4	(0)
2018	→ Meizhou Hakka (loan)	26	(3)
2019–2024	Meizhou Hakka	80	(20)
2023	→ Qingdao West Coast (loan)	22	(4)
2024	→ Ganzhou Ruishi (loan)	9	(0)
2024	Guangxi Pingguo Haliao	7	(1)
2025	Nanjing City	19	(3)
2026–	Hubei Istar	0	(0)

International career
2015	China U22	2	(1)
- * Club domestic league appearances and goals as of 31 December 2022

Guo Yi (Chinese: 郭毅; pinyin: Guō Yì; born 29 January 1993) is a Chinese footballer who plays as a left winger for Chinese League Two club Hubei Istar.

== Career ==
Guo joined Boavista youth team system in 2010 and was promoted to the first team in early 2012. He made his senior debut on 1 April 2012, in a 4–2 home victory against Padroense, coming as a substitute for Nuno Tavares in the 79th minute. Guo transferred to Primeira Liga side Marítimo in the summer of 2012. He was sent to the Marítimo B team. On 18 September 2013, he eventually made his debut in the Segunda Liga against Porto B, coming as a substitute for Kukula in the 88th minute. He was loaned to another Segunda Liga club Tondela in January 2014. However, he failed to establish himself within the team and played just one match in the final round of the season which Tondela lost to Moreirense 1–0 on 11 May 2014. Tondela officially announced Guo's departure on 12 May 2014. Guo moved to Portuguese Second Division side Gondomar in August 2014. Guo transferred to LigaPro side Leixões along with Pan Ximing on 6 July 2015.

On 29 January 2016, Guo transferred to Tianjin Teda in the Chinese Super League. He made his debut for Tianjin on 11 May 2016 in a 7–1 away win against Guangdong Haoxin in the 2016 Chinese FA Cup, coming on for Zhou Tong in the half time. On 17 September 2016, he made his Super League debut in a 2–0 away defeat against Jiangsu Suning, coming on as a substitute for Bai Yuefeng in the 73rd minute.

On 28 February 2018, Guo was loaned to China League One club Meizhou Hakka. He made a permanent transfer to Meizhou Hakka on 2 February 2019. He would go on to be utilized as a vital member of the team that gained promotion to the top tier after coming second within the division at the end of the 2021 China League One campaign.

== Career statistics ==
As of 31 December 2022

Appearances and goals by club, season and competition
Club	Season	League			National cup		League cup		Continental		Total	
Club	Season	Division	Apps	Goals	Apps	Goals	Apps	Goals	Apps	Goals	Apps	Goals
Boavista	2011–12	Segunda Divisão	1	0	0	0	–		–		1	0
Marítimo B (loan)	2012–13	Segunda Liga	0	0	–		–		–		0	0
Marítimo B (loan)	2013–14	Segunda Liga	1	0	–		–		–		1	0
Marítimo B (loan)	Total		1	0	0	0	0	0	0	0	1	0
Tondela (loan)	2013–14	Segunda Liga	1	0	0	0	–		–		1	0
Gondomar	2014–15	Campeonato de Portugal	25	3	2	0	–		–		27	3
Leixões	2015–16	LigaPro	12	0	1	0	3	1	–		16	1
Tianjin Teda	2016	Chinese Super League	4	0	1	0	–		–		5	0
Tianjin Teda	2017	Chinese Super League	0	0	0	0	–		–		0	0
Tianjin Teda	Total		4	0	1	0	0	0	0	0	5	0
Meizhou Hakka (loan)	2018	China League One	26	3	0	0	–		–		26	3
Meizhou Hakka	2019	China League One	27	9	0	0	–		–		27	9
Meizhou Hakka	2020	China League One	10	3	1	1	–		–		11	4
Meizhou Hakka	2021	China League One	33	7	0	0	–		–		33	7
Meizhou Hakka	2022	Chinese Super League	10	1	2	0	–		–		12	1
Meizhou Hakka	Total		80	20	3	1	0	0	0	0	83	21
Career total			150	26	7	1	3	1	0	0	160	28
