= Hadi Amini Pak =

Iranian footballer

Personal information
- Date of birth: 2 August 1994 (age 32)
- Place of birth: Ahvaz, Iran
- Height: 1.84 m (6 ft 0 in)
- Position: Forward

Team information
- Current team: Foolad F.C.
- Number: 27

Senior career*
Years	Team	Apps	(Gls)
2020-2021	Foolad F.C.	5	(0)

International career^{‡}
2017–18	Iran U-17	4	(0)
2019	Iran U-23	5	(0)
- * Club domestic league appearances and goals as of 01:42, 18 October 2023 (UTC) ‡ National team caps and goals as of 01:42, 18 October 2023 (UTC)

Hadi Amini Pak (Persian: هادی امینی پاک; born 2 August 1994) is an Iranian footballer who plays as a forward for Persian Gulf Pro League side Foolad F.C.
