= Pakistan women's national under-17 football team =

Youth football team

Pakistan Women's U-17
- Nickname(s): Green Shirts, Pak Shaheens
- Association: Pakistan Football Federation
- Confederation: AFC (Asia)
- Sub-confederation: SAFF (South Asia)
- Head coach: (Pakistan) Muhammad Rasheed
- Captain: Aliya Sadiq
- FIFA code: PAK
First colours	Second colours

First international
- Bangladesh 14–0 Pakistan (Thimphu, Bhutan; 9 August 2018)

Biggest win
- Did not win a game yet

Biggest defeat
- Bangladesh 14–0 Pakistan (Thimphu, Bhutan; 9 August 2018)

World Cup
- Appearances: 0

Asian Cup
- Appearances: 0

SAFF Championship
- Appearances: 1 (first in 2018)
- Best result: Group stage (2018)

The Pakistan women's U-17 national football team is a youth women's football team operated under the Pakistan Football Federation. The team has so far represented Pakistan at the AFC U-17 Women's Asian Cup and the SAFF U-17 Women's Championship.

== Team image ==
=== Nicknames ===
The Pakistan women's national under-17 football team has been known or nicknamed as the Green Shirts, Pak Shaheens.

=== Home stadium ===
Bolivia plays their home matches on the Karachi United Stadium and others stadiums.

== History ==
The Pakistan women's national under-17 football team is the very weakest women's soccer team alongside Bhutan and Sri Lanka in the SAFF region. They team have played their debut game on 9 August 2018 at Thimphu, Bhutan versus Bangladesh which lost by 0–14 goals. The nations are not regularly participating in their SAFF and AFC competitions. They yet to qualified AFC U-17 Women's Asian Cup.

== Current squad ==
The following squad was announced for 2019 AFC U-16 Women's Championship qualification

As of 12 November 2022

No.	Pos.	Player	Date of birth (age)	Caps	Goals	Club
1	GK	Ayesha Naseem	2 May 2005	0	0	(Pakistan Football Federation)
3	DF	Anushey Usman	20 May 2004	0	0	(Pakistan Football Federation)
4	DF	Shanza	10 December 2004	0	0	(Pakistan Football Federation)
5	DF	Zara Hameed	23 January 2005	0	0	(Pakistan Football Federation)
6	MF	Smavia Yasir	4 April 2004	0	0	(Pakistan Football Federation)
7	FW	Alina Ispahani	23 August 2004	0	0	(Pakistan Football Federation)
8	MF	Sanober	9 November 2005	0	0	(Pakistan Football Federation)
9	MF	Aliza Sabir	5 February 2004	0	0	(Pakistan Football Federation)
10	FW	Aliya Sadiq (Captain)	8 June 2004	0	0	(Pakistan Football Federation)
11	MF	Marium Zehri	29 July 2004	0	0	(Pakistan Football Federation)
12	MF	Faima Qayyum	15 February 2004	0	0	(Pakistan Football Federation)
13	DF	Syeda Umme Zunaira Shah	12 January 2005	0	0	(Pakistan Football Federation)
14	DF	Adan Aftab	9 August 2004	0	0	(Pakistan Football Federation)
16	MF	Noor Qaiser	30 June 2004	0	0	(Pakistan Football Federation)
17	MF	Seemal Saad	27 January 2004	0	0	(Pakistan Football Federation)
19	GK	Nida Karim	27 December 2004	0	0	(Pakistan Football Federation)
20	DF	Shumaila Hussain	14 January 2005	0	0	(Pakistan Football Federation)
21	DF	Fatima Imran	20 November 2005	0	0	(Pakistan Football Federation)
22	DF	Huda Naz	8 September 2004	0	0	(Pakistan Football Federation)

== Fixtures and results ==
Legend

Win Draw Loss Fixtures

== Competitive record ==
Champions Runners-up Third place Fourth place

=== FIFA U-17 Women's World Cup ===
FIFA U-17 Women's World Cup record
Year	Result	Position	Pld	W	D	L	GF	GA
(New Zealand) 2008	Did not qualify							
(Trinidad and Tobago) 2010	Did not qualify							
(Azerbaijan) 2012	Did not qualify							
(Costa Rica) 2014	Did not qualify							
(Jordan) 2016	Did not qualify							
(Uruguay) 2018	Did not qualify							
(India) 2022	Did not qualify							
(Dominican Republic) 2024	Did not enter							
(Morocco) 2025	Did not qualify							
(Morocco) 2026	Did not qualify							
Total	0/10	0 Titles	0	0	0	0	0	0

*Draws include knockout matches decided on penalty kicks.

=== AFC U-17 Women's Asian Cup ===
AFC U-17 Women's Asian Cup record
Year	Round	Position	MP	W	D*	L	GF	GA
(Japan) 2005 to (Indonesia) 2022	Did not qualify							
(Indonesia) 2024	Did not qualify							
(China) 2026	Did not qualify							
(China) 2027	Did not qualify							
Total	–	0/11	0	0	0	0	0	0

*Draws include knockout matches decided on penalty kicks.

=== AFC U-17 Women's Asian Cup qualification ===
AFC U-17 Women's Asian Cup qualification record
Year	Round	Position	MP	W	D*	L	GF	GA
(Japan) 2005 to (Indonesia) 2015	Did not participate							
(Thailand) 2017	Withdrew							
(Thailand) 2019	DNQ	–	4	0	0	4	0	20
(Indonesia) ~~2022~~	Cancelled							
(Indonesia) 2024	To be determined							
(China) 2026	Did not participate							
(China) 2027	Did not participate							
Total	–	1/11	4	0	0	4	0	20

*Draws include knockout matches decided on penalty kicks.

=== SAFF U-17 Championship ===
SAFF U-17 Women's Championship record
Year	Result	Position	Pld	W	D	L	GF	GA
(Bangladesh) 2017	Did Not Participate							
(Bhutan) 2018	Group stage	6/6	2	0	0	2	0	18
(Bhutan) 2019	Did Not Participate							
(Bangladesh) 2022	Did Not Participate							
(Bangladesh) 2023	Did Not Participate							
(Nepal) 2024	Did Not Participate							
(Bhutan) 2025	Did Not Participate							
(Bhutan) 2026	To be Determined							
Total	1/8	0 Title	2	0	0	2	0	18
