= 2018–19 in Pakistani football =

Football in Pakistan
- Season: 2018–19

Men's football
- Pakistan Premier League: Khan Research Laboratories
- National Challenge Cup: Pakistan Airforce

The 2018–19 season was the 71st in Pakistani football. It was the first season in Pakistan football after FIFA lifted its ban on Pakistan from all footballing activities which was implemented on 10 October 2017.

== National teams ==
=== 2019 ===
6 June 2019 2022 FIFA WC qualification	Cambodia	2–0	Pakistan	Phnom Penh, Cambodia
18:30 UTC+7	Chanthea 81'; Sokumpheak 84'	Report		Stadium: Phnom Penh Olympic Stadium; Attendance: 33,706; Referee: Shaun Evans (Australia)

11 June 2019 2022 FIFA WC qualification	Pakistan	1–2	Cambodia	Doha, Qatar
19:00 UTC+3	Bashir 18'	Report	Sokpheng 64'; Bunheing 89'	Stadium: Hamad bin Khalifa Stadium; Referee: Hanna Hattab (Syria)

==== 2018 SAFF Championship ====
Group A

Pos	Team	Pld	W	D	L	GF	GA	GD	Pts	Qualification
1	Nepal	3	2	0	1	7	2	+5	6	Qualified for semi-finals
2	Pakistan	3	2	0	1	5	2	+3	6	Qualified for semi-finals
3	Bangladesh (H)	3	2	0	1	3	2	+1	6	
4	Bhutan	3	0	0	3	0	9	−9	0	

Source: RSSSF
(H) Hosts

4 September 2018	Nepal	1–2	Pakistan	Dhaka
16:00	B. Magar 82'	Report	Bashir 36' (pen.); Mu. Ali 90+6'	Stadium: Bangabandhu National Stadium; Referee: Mohammad Arafah (Jordan)

6 September 2018	Bangladesh	1–0	Pakistan	Dhaka
19:00	Barman 85'	Report		Stadium: Bangabandhu National Stadium; Referee: Hasan Akrami (Iran)

8 September 2018	Pakistan	3–0	Bhutan	Dhaka
16:00	Riaz 20'; Bashir 29'; F. Ahmed 90+1'	Report		Stadium: Bangabandhu National Stadium; Referee: Hasan Akrami (Iran)

Semi-final

12 September 2018	India	3−1	Pakistan	Dhaka
19:00 IST	Manvir Singh 48', 69'; Sumeet Passi 84'	Report	Muhammed Ali 88'	Stadium: Bangabandhu National Stadium; Referee: Sivakorn Pu-udom (Thailand)

=== Pakistan men's national under-15 football team ===
==== 2018 SAFF U-15 Championship ====
Group B

Pos	Team	Pld	W	D	L	GF	GA	GD	Pts	Status
1	Pakistan	2	2	0	0	6	1	+5	6	Qualified for Knockout stage
2	India	2	1	0	1	5	2	+3	3	Qualified for Knockout stage
3	Bhutan	2	0	0	2	0	8	−8	0	

Source: SAFF

25 October 2018	India	1–2	Pakistan	ANFA Complex, Lalitpur, Nepal
11:30	Thlacheu Vanlalruatfela 53'	SAFF AIFF	Adnan Justin 36'; Wasif 85'

27 October 2018	Bhutan	0–4	Pakistan	ANFA Complex, Lalitpur, Nepal
11:30		SAFF	Mudassar Nazar 20'; Iftikar Ahmed 23'; Moin Ahmed 29', 42'

Semi-finals

1 November 2018	Pakistan	4–0	Nepal	ANFA Complex, Lalitpur, Nepal
14:30	54' (o.g.); Mohib Ullah 59' (pen.), 68' (pen.); Moin Ahmed 77'	SAFF		Referee: Pema Tshewang (Bhutan)

Finals

3 November 2018	Bangladesh	1–1 (3–2 p)	Pakistan	ANFA Complex, Lalitpur, Nepal
14:30	Haseeb Khan 25' (o.g.)	SAFF	Mohib Ullah 54' (pen.)	Referee: Sudish Kumar Pandey (Nepal)
	Penalties
	Rajon Howladar (penalty missed); Tauhidul Islam Riday (penalty scored); Raja Ansari (penalty scored); Rostom Mia (penalty scored); Md. Rabi Ul Islam (penalty missed)		(penalty missed) Junaid Shah; (penalty missed) Adnan Justin; (penalty scored) Mohib Ullah; (penalty scored) Wasif; (penalty missed) Mudassar Nazar

=== Pakistan women's national under-18 football team ===
==== 2018 SAFF U-18 Women's Championship ====
Group A

- Times listed are UTC+6

Pos	Team	Pld	W	D	L	GF	GA	GD	Pts	Status
1	Bangladesh	2	2	0	0	19	1	+18	6	Qualified for Knockout stage
2	Nepal	2	1	0	1	13	2	+11	3	Qualified for Knockout stage
3	Pakistan	2	0	0	2	0	29	−29	0	

Source: Championship schedule according to the SAFF U18 Women's Championship official website.SAFF

28 September 2018	Nepal	12–0	Pakistan	Changlimithang Stadium
19:00	Rekha Paudel 5', 17', 19', 32', 38', 71', 74'; Saru Limbu 47'; Rashmi Kumari Ghising 67'; Alisha Jimba 82'; Manjali Kumari Yonjan 87'; Manisha Raut 92'	Report

30 September 2018	Pakistan	0–17	Bangladesh	Changlimithang Stadium
19:00		Report	10', 30', 40', 62', 73', 76', 90' Mossammat Sirat Jahan Shopna; 7', 13', 22', 71' Marzia; 37' Mossammat Mishrat Jahan Moushumi; 58' Mossammat Akhi Khatun; 74' Srimoti Krishna Rani Sarker; 87' Tohura Khatun; 32', 69' (pen.) Sheuli Azim

=== Pakistan women's national under-15 football team ===
==== 2018 SAFF U-15 Women's Championship ====
Pos	Team	Pld	W	D	L	GF	GA	GD	Pts	Status
1	Bangladesh	2	2	0	0	17	0	+17	6	Qualified for Semi-finals
2	Nepal	2	1	0	1	4	3	+1	3	Qualified for Semi-finals
3	Pakistan	2	0	0	2	0	18	−18	0	

Source: Bhutan Football

9 August 2018	Bangladesh	14–0	Pakistan	Changlimithang Stadium, Thimphu
19:00	Tohura Khatun 5', 19'; Monika Chakma 17'; Shamsunnahar 31'; Maria Manda 39'; Akhi Khatun 40'; Sajeda Khatun 48', 58'; Shamsunnahai 50', 54', 57', 90'; Anai Mogini 60', 88'

11 August 2018	Nepal	4–0	Pakistan	Changlimithang Stadium, Thimphu
19:00	Anuska Sherpa 8'; Sabita Rana Magar 14', 56'; Rajani Thokar 59'

== Club competitions ==
=== Changes in the Premier League ===
Teams promoted to the 2018–19 Pakistan Premier League:

Football Federation League

- Pakistan Navy
- Baloch Nushki

Promotional play-offs

- Ashraf Sugar Mills
- Civil Aviation Authority
- Sui Northern Gas
- Sui Southern Gas

Teams relegated from the 2018–19 Pakistan Premier League:

- Karachi Port Trust
- Baloch Nushki
- Ashraf Sugar Mills
- Pakistan Airlines

=== Pakistan Premier League ===
Pos	Team	Pld	W	D	L	GF	GA	GD	Pts	Qualification or relegation
1	Khan Research Laboratories (C)	26	14	9	3	40	12	+28	51	
2	Pakistan Airforce	26	14	9	3	40	13	+27	51	
3	Sui Southern Gas	26	15	5	6	32	16	+16	50	
4	Pakistan Army	26	12	10	4	38	19	+19	46	
5	WAPDA	26	13	6	7	32	18	+14	45	
6	K-Electric	26	10	11	5	30	21	+9	41	
7	Civil Aviation Authority	26	11	6	9	31	27	+4	39	
8	National Bank	26	9	6	11	27	27	0	33	
9	Pakistan Navy	26	10	3	13	30	37	−7	33	
10	Muslim	26	5	13	8	16	17	−1	28	
11	Afghan Chaman	26	8	4	14	24	44	−20	28	
12	Sui Northern Gas	26	3	14	9	28	33	−5	23	
13	Karachi Port Trust (R)	26	4	6	16	19	46	−27	18	Relegation to 2020 PFF League
14	Baloch Nushki (R)	26	0	6	20	12	69	−57	6	Relegation to 2020 PFF League

Source: Soccerway.com
Rules for classification: 1) points; 2) head-to-head points; 3) head-to-head goal difference; 4) goal difference; 5) number of goals scored; 6) drawing of lots
(C) Champions; (R) Relegated

=== National Challenge Cup ===
==== Bracket ====
Quarter-finals
3 May – 4:00 PM
Ashraf Sugar Mill F.C.	0
PPL F.C.	3
4 May – 4:00 PM
Navy F.C.	0
WAPDA F.C. (AET)	2
5 May – 4:00 PM
PAF F.C. (P)	0 (4)
Army F.C.	0 (2)
6 May – 4:00 PM
CAA F.C.	2
Asia Ghee Mill F.C.	1

Semi-finals
7 May – 4:00 PM
PPL F.C.	0
WAPDA F.C.	2
8 May – 4:00 PM
PAF F.C. (P)	1 (4)
CAA F.C.	1 (3)

Final
10 May – 4:00 PM
WAPDA F.C.	1
PAF F.C.	2
