= 2025 SAFF U-17 Women's Championship =

Tournament details
- Host country: Bhutan
- City: Thimphu
- Dates: 20–31 August 2025
- Teams: 4 (from 1 sub-confederation)
- Venue: 1

Final positions
- Champions: India (3rd title)
- Runners-up: Bangladesh
- Third place: Nepal
- Fourth place: Bhutan

Tournament statistics
- Matches played: 12
- Goals scored: 53 (4.42 per match)
- Top scorer: (India) Anushka Kumari (8 goals)
- Best player: (India) Abhista Basnett
- Best goalkeeper: (Bangladesh) Meghla Rani Roy
- Fair play award: Bangladesh

The 2025 SAFF U-17 Women's Championship was the 7th edition of SAFF U-17 Women's Championship an international football competition for women's under-17 national teams, organized by SAFF. The tournament was played in Bhutan from 20–31 August 2025. Four teams from the region participated in the tournament. Bangladesh are the defending champion.

India is the defending champion having won the title for the finished tournament by 5 win of 6 with 15 points on 31 August 2025.

== Host selection ==
At the SAFF Executive Committee virtual meeting, held on 24 December 2024 in the Dhaka, Bangladesh SAFF announced the name of Bhutan host country of the tournament.

== Players eligibility ==
Players born on or after 1 January 2008 are eligible to compete in the tournament. Each team has to register a squad of minimum 16 players and maximum 23 players, minimum two of whom must be goalkeepers.

== Participating nations ==
The following four nations are participating in the tournament.

Team	Appearances in the SAFF U-17 Women's Championship	Best performance
Bangladesh	7th	Champions (2017, 2024)
Bhutan (Host)	7th	3rd place (2018)
India	6th	Champions (2018, 2019)
Nepal	7th	Champions (2022)

== Venue ==
All matches being play at this venue.

Thimphu
Changlimithang Stadium
Capacity: 25,000
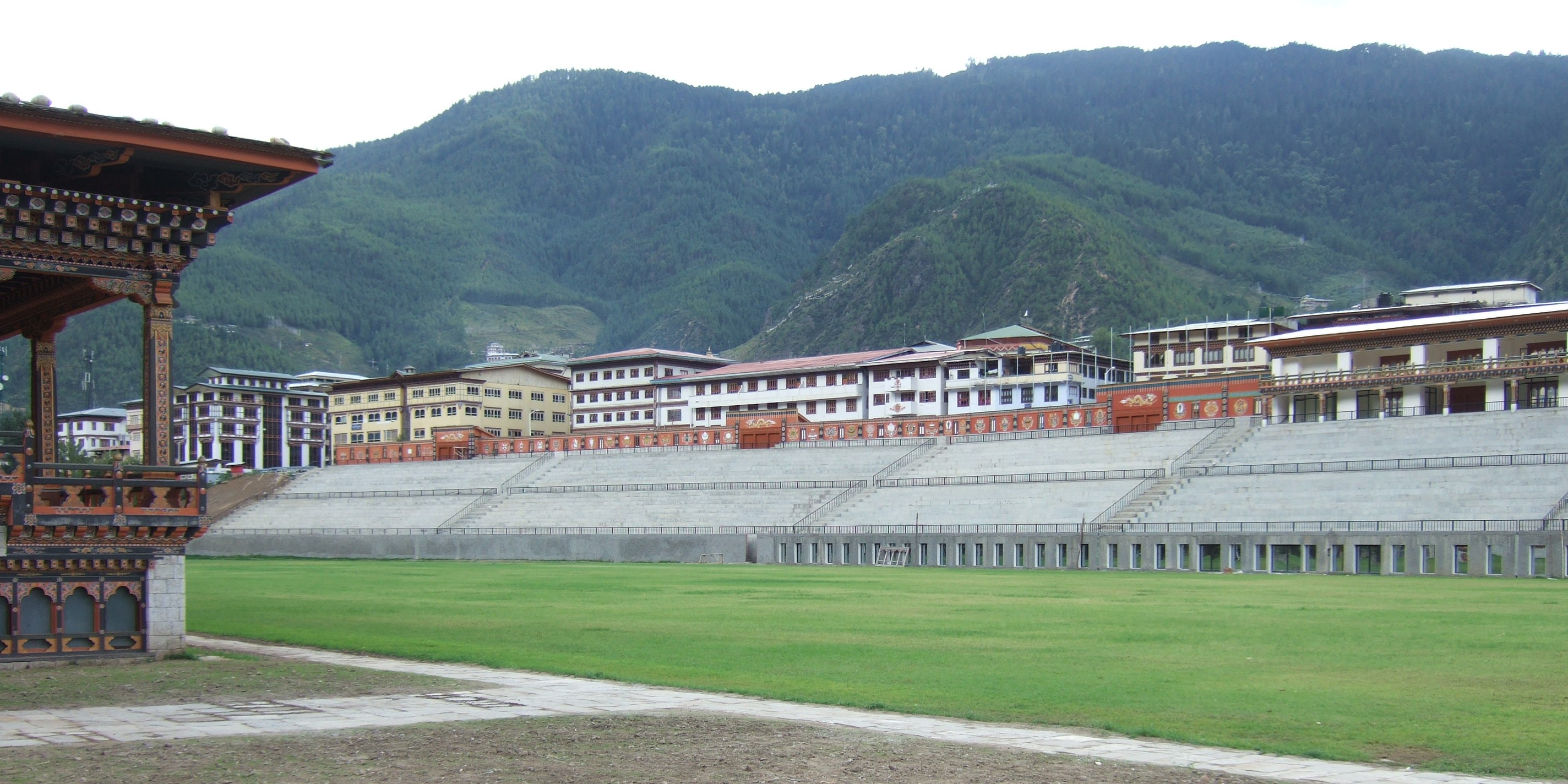

== Draw ==
The draw and fixtures were announced by SAFF tournament committee on 9 July 2025 in Dhaka, Bangladesh. The four nations will play each other twice in the round robin format.

== Squads ==
The following squads were announced ahead of the tournament.

Bangladesh	Bhutan (Host)	India	Nepal
Mst Yearzan Begum (GK); Meghla Rani Roy (GK); Ishita Tripure (GK); Shiuly Roy (DF); Arifa Akter (DF); Arpita Biswas Arpita (DF) (C); Kranuching Marma (DF); Sorovi Rani (DF); Tania Akter Fomi (DF); Mst Amena Khatun (DF); Purnima Marma (DF); Umma Kulsum (MF); Thuinuye Marma (MF); Fatema Akter (MF); Joba Rani (MF); Mst Almina (MF); Reya (MF); Mst Momita (MF); Mamoni Chakma (FW); Alpi Akter (FW); Sauravi Akanda Prity (FW); Protima Rani (FW); Mst Reshme Akter (FW); ★ Head coach: (Bangladesh) Mahbubur Rahman Litu	Kelzang Wangmo (GK); Nima Wangmo; Kelzang Wangmo; Susmita Subba; Sonam Choden (C); Tenzin Lhazom; Pema Dekar; Sonam Yangchen; Reyang Gisel Wangchuk; Tshering Lhamo; Khandu Tshomo; Rinzin Dema; Tenzin Yangden Dorjee; Dechen Dolkar; Ugyen Toshmo; Kuenzang Lhamo; Kuenden Sonam Tshogyel; Chorten Zangmo; Kinley Zangmo; Pema Lhazin; Deki Yangzom; Sonam Yeshay Pelmo; Ismita Rai; ★ Head coach: (India) Anjana Turambekar	Munni (GK); Surajmuni Kumari (GK); Tamphasana Devi Konjengbam (GK); Alena Devi Sarangthem (DF); Alisha Lyngdoh (DF); Binita Horo (DF); Divyani Linda (DF); Elizabed Lakra (DF); Priya (DF); Ritu Badaik (DF); Taniya Devi Tonambam (DF); Abhista Basnett (MF); Anita Dungdung (MF); Beena Kumari (MF); Bonifilia Shullai (MF); Julan Nongmaithem (MF); Pritika Barman (MF); Shveta Rani (MF); Thandamoni Baskey (MF); Anushka Kumari (FW); Nira Chanu Longjam (FW); Pearl Fernandes (FW); Valaina Jada Fernandes (FW); ★ Head coach: (Sweden) Joakim Alexandersson	Jharna Dumrakoti (GK); Laxmi Oli (GK); Ganga Gurung (GK); Dikshya Rayamajhi (DF); Samjhana Chand (DF); Alija Kumari BK (DF); Gyanshu Dolmo Lo (DF); Purnia Tadi (DF); Anu Majhi (DF); Min Maya Shrestha (DF); Anshu BK (DF); Diki Syangbo Tamang (MF); Kritisha Tamang (MF); Rabina BK (MF); Sahara Limbu (MF); Babtika Karki (MF); Bhumika Ubdathoki (MF); Ashika Karki (MF); Srijana Baduwal (MF); Asmita Magar (FW); Yam Kumari BK (FW); Anita Rana Magar (FW); Dikshya Ranpal (FW); ★ Head coach: (Nepal) Chet Narayan Shrestha

== Match officials ==
The following match officials were chosen for the officiated in the tournament.

Referees

- (Bangladesh) Sharaban Tahura
- (Bhutan) Meera Tamang
- (India) Neetu Rana
- (Nepal) Kriti Sen
- (Sri Lanka) Pabasara Minisarani Yapa

Assistant Referees

- (Bangladesh) Sohana Khatun
- (Bhutan) Kinzang Choden
- (India) Lalhruaizeli Khiangte
- (Nepal) Somika Rai
- (Sri Lanka) HM Malika Madhushani

Match Commissioners

- (Bangladesh) Tayeb Hasan Shamsuzzaman
- (Bhutan) Mindu Dorji
- (India) Wendy Assunta Decosta

== Round robin ==
Key to colours in group tables
Champion

Tiebreakers

Teams are ranked according to points (3 points for a win, 1 point for a draw, 0 points for a loss), and if tied on points, the following tie-breaking criteria are applied, in the order given, to determine the rankings.

1. Points in head-to-head matches among tied teams;
2. Goal difference in head-to-head matches among tied teams;
3. Goals scored in head-to-head matches among tied teams;
4. If more than two teams are tied, and after applying all head-to-head criteria above, a subset of teams are still tied, all head-to-head criteria above are reapplied exclusively to this subset of teams;
5. Goal difference in all group matches;
6. Goals scored in all group matches;
7. Penalty shoot-out if only two teams are tied and they met in the last round of the group;
8. Disciplinary points (yellow card = 1 point, red card as a result of two yellow cards = 3 points, direct red card = 3 points, yellow card followed by direct red card = 4 points);
9. Drawing of lots.

=== Standing ===
Pos	Team	Pld	W	D	L	GF	GA	GD	Pts	Status
1	India	6	5	0	1	30	4	+26	15	Champion
2	Bangladesh	6	4	1	1	15	8	+7	13	
3	Nepal	6	1	1	4	4	21	−17	4	
4	Bhutan (H)	6	0	2	4	4	20	−16	2	

Source: SAFF
Rules for classification: 1) points; 2) head-to-head points; 3) head-to-head goal difference; 4) goal difference; 5) number of goals scored;
(H) Hosts
20 August 2025
15:00

India	7–0	Nepal
Basnett 16', 42'; Longjam 26', 56'; A. Kumari 34', 62'; Nongmaithem 45+2'	Report

Changlimithang Stadium, Thimphu
Attendance: 150
Referee: Meera Tamang (Bhutan)
20 August 2025
18:00

Bangladesh	3–1	Bhutan
Prity 45+3'; Akter 54', 66'	Report	Choden 62'

Changlimithang Stadium, Thimphu
Attendance: 249
Referee: Minisarani Y. Pabasara (Sri Lanka)

22 August 2025
15:00

Bangladesh	0–2	India
	Report	P. Fernandes 14'; Shullai 76'

Changlimithang Stadium, Thimphu
Attendance: 100
Referee: Meera Tamang (Bhutan)
22 August 2025
18:00

Bhutan	1–2	Nepal
Tshogyal 42'	Report	Limbu 58', 77'

Changlimithang Stadium, Thimphu
Attendance: 285
Referee: Neetu Rana (India)

24 August 2025
15:00

Bhutan	0–8	India
	Report	Basnett 23', 88'; A. Kumari 53', 61', 72'; P. Fernandes 71'; Linda 77'; V. Fernandes 90+2'

Changlimithang Stadium, Thimphu
Attendance: 185
Referee: Sharaban Tahura (Bangladesh)
24 August 2025
18:00

Bangladesh	3–0	Nepal
Thuinuye 41'; Prity 45'; Reya 90+2'	Report

Changlimithang Stadium, Thimphu
Attendance: 350
Referee: Minisarani Y. Pabasara (Sri Lanka)

27 August 2025
15:00

Bangladesh	4–1	Nepal
Thuinuye 38'; Prity 45', 71', 86'	Report	Bhumika 47'

Changlimithang Stadium, Thimphu
Attendance: 95
Referee: Neetu Rana (India)
27 August 2025
18:00

India	5–0	Bhutan
A. Kumari 4', 16'; Rani 24'; Nongmaithem 77'; Longjam 90+5'	Report

Changlimithang Stadium, Thimphu
Attendance: 193
Referee: Kriti Sen (Nepal)

29 August 2025
15:00

Bhutan	1–1	Bangladesh
Zangmo 45+1'	Report	Purnima 6'

Changlimithang Stadium, Thimphu
Attendance: 143
Referee: Kriti Sen (Nepal)
29 August 2025
18:00

India	5–0	Nepal
Longjam 5'; P. Fernandes 15', 43'; Linda 79', 90+2'	Report

Changlimithang Stadium, Thimphu
Attendance: 171
Referee: Sharaban Tahura (Bangladesh)

31 August 2025
15:00

Bangladesh	4–3	India
Purnima 1'; Alpi 34'; Prity 49', 90+5'	Report	A. Kumari 9'; Barman 65'; Nongmaithem 89'

Changlimithang Stadium, Thimphu
Attendance: 351
Referee: Meera Tamang (Bhutan)
31 August 2025
18:00

Bhutan	1–1	Nepal
Yangchen 45+'	Report	Karki 15'

Changlimithang Stadium, Thimphu
Attendance: 385
Referee: Neetu Rana (India)

== Winners ==
2025 SAFF U-17 Women's Championship Champions

India
Third title

== Statistics ==
=== Goalscorers ===
There have been 44 goals scored in 12 matches, for an average of 3.67 goals per match. Source: GSA

8 Goals

- (India) Anushka Kumari

7 Goals

- (Bangladesh) Sauravi Akanda Prity

4 Goals

- (India) Abhista Basnett
- (India) Pearl Fernanades
- (India) Nira Chanu Longjam

3 Goals

- (Bangladesh) Alpi Akter
- (India) Divyani Linda
- (India) Julan Nongmaithem

2 Goals

- (Bangladesh) Purnima Marma
- (Bangladesh) Thuinuye Marma
- (Nepal) Sahara Limbu

1 Goal

- (Bangladesh) Reya
- (Bhutan) Chorten Zangmo
- (Bhutan) Rinzin Dema Choden
- (Bhutan) Kuenden Sonam Tshogyal
- (Bhutan) Sonam Yangchen
- (India) Valaina Fernandes
- (India) Bonifilia Shullai
- (India) Shveta Rani
- (Nepal) Bhumika Budathoki
- (India) Patrick Barman
- (Nepal) Babtika Karki

=== Hat trick ===
Player	Against	Result	Date	Ref
(India) Anushka Kumari	Bhutan	8–0	24 August 2025	
(Bangladesh) Sauravi Akanda Prity	Nepal	4–1	27 August 2025	

== Awards ==
The following awards were given at the conclusion of the tournament:

Most Valuable Player	Top scorer	Best Goalkeeper	Fair Play Award
(India) Abhista Basnett	(India) Anushka Kumari	(Bangladesh) Meghla Rani Roy	Bangladesh

== Broadcasting ==
Territory	Broadcaster(s)	Reference
No restricted territory	Sportzworkz^{(YouTube Channel)}	2025 SAFF U-17 Women's matches playlist on YouTube
South Asia (No restricted territory)	SAFF Football^{(YouTube Channel)}	2025 SAFF U-17 Women's matches's channel on YouTube

== See also ==
- 2025–26 AFC Women's Champions League
- 2025 SAFF U-17 Women's Championship
- 2025 SAFF U-20 Women's Championship
