= 2023 SAFF U-17 Women's Championship =

UEFA Assist SAFF U-17 Women's Championship

Tournament details
- Host country: Bangladesh
- City: Dhaka
- Dates: 20–28 March
- Teams: 5 (from 2 confederations)
- Venue: 1

Final positions
- Champions: Russia (1st title)
- Runners-up: Bangladesh
- Third place: India
- Fourth place: Nepal

Tournament statistics
- Matches played: 10
- Goals scored: 49 (4.9 per match)
- Attendance: 5,783 (578 per match)
- Top scorer(s): (India) Shilji Shaji (8 goals)
- Best player: (Russia) Elena Golik
- Best goalkeeper: (Nepal) Sujata Tamang
- Fair play award: India

The 2023 UEFA Assist U-17 Women's Championship was the 5th edition of SAFF U-17 Women's Championship, an international football competition for women's under-17 national teams, organized by SAFF in collaboration with UEFA. The tournament was played in Bangladesh from 20 to 28 March 2023. Five teams from the region took part.

Nepal was the defending champion having won the previous 2022 edition title for the finished top of the league table.

== Player eligibility ==
Players born on or after 1 January 2008 are eligible to compete in the tournament. Each team has to register a squad of minimum 16 players and maximum 23 players, minimum two of whom must be goalkeepers.

== Participating nations ==
Russia is set to feature in the tournament for the first time as a guest nation, following suspension by FIFA and UEFA for the 2022 Russian invasion of Ukraine.

Team	Appearances in the SAFF U-17 Women's Championship	Previous best performance
Bangladesh (Host)	3rd	Champions (2017)
Bhutan	3rd	3rd (2018)
India	3rd	Champions (2018, 2019)
Nepal	3rd	Champions (2022)
Russia (invitee)	1st	debut

== Venue ==
All matches will be held at the BSSS Mostafa Kamal Stadium in Dhaka, Bangladesh

Dhaka	Dhaka is located in Bangladesh
BSSS Mostafa Kamal Stadium	Dhaka is located in Bangladesh
Capacity: 25,000	Dhaka is located in Bangladesh

== Match officials ==
Referees

- (Bangladesh) Jaya Chakma
- (Bhutan) Yangkhey Tshering
- (India) Kanika Barman
- (Nepal) Anjana Rai
- (Nepal) Meera Tamang

Assistant Referees

- (Bangladesh) Salma Akter Mone
- (Nepal) Prem Kumari Sunwar
- (Bhutan) Choden Kingzang
- (Nepal) Radhika Shakya
- (India) Abhirami Thambilali

== Tournament format ==
Single round-robin, each team will play each other. The team with the most points becomes champion.

Key to colours in league table define Champion
Champion

Tiebreakers

Teams are ranked according to points (3 points for a win, 1 point for a draw, 0 points for a loss), and if tied on points, the following tiebreaking criteria are applied, in the order given, to determine the rankings.

1. Points in head-to-head matches among tied teams;
2. Goal difference in head-to-head matches among tied teams;
3. Goals scored in head-to-head matches among tied teams;
4. If more than two teams are tied, and after applying all head-to-head criteria above, a subset of teams are still tied, all head-to-head criteria above are reapplied exclusively to this subset of teams;
5. Goal difference in all group matches;
6. Goals scored in all group matches;
7. Penalty shoot-out if only two teams are tied and they met in the last round of the group;
8. Disciplinary points (yellow card = 1 point, red card as a result of two yellow cards = 3 points, direct red card = 3 points, yellow card followed by direct red card = 4 points).

== League table ==
=== Standing ===
Pos	Team	Pld	W	D	L	GF	GA	GD	Pts	Status
1	Russia	4	4	0	0	17	1	+16	12	Champion
2	Bangladesh (H)	4	2	1	1	10	5	+5	7	
3	India	4	2	0	2	13	4	+9	6	
4	Nepal	4	1	1	2	7	8	−1	4	
5	Bhutan	4	0	0	4	2	31	−29	0	

Source: SAFF
(H) Hosts

== Matches ==
All times at local (UTC+6)

20 March 2023
15:15

Nepal	1–4	India
Barsha Oli 54'	Report (SAFF); Report (AIFF)	Shilji 10', 40', 81'; Pooja 41'

BSSS Mostafa Kamal Stadium, Dhaka
Attendance: 203
Referee: Yangkhey Tshering (Bhutan)
20 March 2023
19:15

Bhutan	1–8	Bangladesh
Preya Ghalley 64'	Report (SAFF); Report (UNB)	Sree Moti Trisna Rani 16', 28'; Mst Sultana Akter 35'; Sauravi Akanda Prity 42'; Thuinuye Marma 60', 77'; Munne 61'; Sagorika 85'

BSSS Mostafa Kamal Stadium, Dhaka
Attendance: 314
Referee: Kanika Barman (India)

22 March 2023
15:15

Bangladesh	0–3	Russia
	Report (SAFF); Report (UNB)	Elena Golik 5', 45'; Anastasia Karataeva 62'

BSSS Mostafa Kamal Stadium, Dhaka
Attendance: 1,200
Referee: Anjana Rai (Nepal)
22 March 2023
19:15

Bhutan	0–5	Nepal
	Report (SAFF); Report (Goalnepal)	Barsha Oli 16', 50'; Dipa Rokaya 30'; Senu Pariyar 34', 58'

BSSS Mostafa Kamal Stadium, Dhaka
Attendance: 332
Referee: Jaya Chakma (Bangladesh)

24 March 2023
15:15

Russia	9–1	Bhutan
Anastasiia Chernousova 11', 46', 48'; Elena Golik 14'; Anastasia Karataeva 37'; Eseniia Kadyntseva 45+4', 59'; Sofia Golovina 49'; Polina Bogdanova 66'	Report (SAFF); Report (TBS)	Kira Naumova 49' (o.g.)

BSSS Mostafa Kamal Stadium, Dhaka
Attendance: 312
Referee: Kanika Barman (India)
24 March 2023
19:15

India	0–1	Bangladesh
	Report (SAFF); Report (Daily Sun)	Akhila Rajan 74' (o.g.)

BSSS Mostafa Kamal Stadium, Dhaka
Attendance: 1,324
Referee: Anjana Rai (Nepal)

26 March 2023
15:15

India	9–0	Bhutan
Menaka Lourembam 3'; Shilji 12', 62', 69', 76', 79'; Sibani Devi Nongmeikapam 42', 61'; Thoibisana 56'	Report (SAFF); Report (AIFF)

BSSS Mostafa Kamal Stadium, Dhaka
Attendance: 452
Referee: Anjana Rai (Nepal)
26 March 2023
19:15

Nepal	0–3	Russia
	Report (SAFF); Report (Himal Sanchar)	Elena Golik 63', 75'; Polina Filshina 83'

BSSS Mostafa Kamal Stadium, Dhaka
Attendance: 326
Referee: Meera Tamang (Nepal)

28 March 2023
15:15

Bangladesh	1–1	Nepal
Sagorika 75'	Report (SAFF); Report (TBS)	Senu Pariyar 8'

BSSS Mostafa Kamal Stadium, Dhaka
Attendance: 607
Referee: Kanika Barman (India)
28 March 2023
19:15

Russia	2–0	India
Vasilisa Avdienko 10'; Daria Kotlova 13'	Report (SAFF); Report (AIFF)

BSSS Mostafa Kamal Stadium, Dhaka
Attendance: 713
Referee: Jaya Chakma (Bangladesh)

== Awards ==
2023 SAFF U-17 Women's Championship Champions

Russia
First title

== Statistics ==
=== Goalscorers ===
There were 49 goals scored in 10 matches, for an average of 4.9 goals per match. Source: SAFF

8 Goals

- (India) Shilji Shaji

5 Goals

- (Russia) Elena Golik

3 Goals

- (Nepal) Senu Pariyar
- (Nepal) Barsha Oli
- (Russia) Anastasiia Chernousova

2 Goals

- (Bangladesh) Mst. Sagorika
- (Bangladesh) Sree Moti Trisna Rani
- (Bangladesh) Thuinuye Marma
- (Russia) Anastasia Karataeva
- (Russia) Eseniia Kadyntseva
- (India) Sibani Devi Nongmeikapam

1 Goal

- (Bangladesh) Mst Sultana Akter
- (Bangladesh) Sauravi Akanda Prity
- (Bangladesh) Munne
- (Bhutan) Preya Ghalley
- (India) Pooja
- (India) Thoibisana Chanu Toijam
- (India) Menaka Lourembam
- (Nepal) Dipa Rokaya
- (Russia) Sofia Golovina
- (Russia) Polina Bogdanova
- (Russia) Polina Filshina
- (Russia) Vasilisa Avdienko
- (Russia) Daria Kotlova

Own Goals

- (India) Akhila Rajan (against Bangladesh)
- (Russia) Kira Naumova (against Bhutan)

== See also ==
2023 in SAFF
Men's
U-16 Championship	U-19 Championship	Senior Championship (Final)
Women's
U-17 Championship	U-20 Championship	
