= Golam Rabbani Choton =

Bangladeshi association football manager and former player

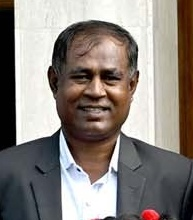
- Choton in 2022

Personal information
- Full name: Golam Rabbani Choton
- Date of birth: 2 July 1968 (age 58)
- Place of birth: Bogra, Rajshahi, East Pakistan (present-day Bangladesh)
- Position: Defender

Team information
- Current team: BFF Elite Academy (head coach)

Senior career*
Years	Team	Apps	(Gls)
1983–1986	Basabo TS		
1987–1990	Fakirerpool		
1991–1993	Wari Club		
1994	Fakirerpool YMC		
1995–2001	Arambagh KS		
2002	BRTC SC		

Managerial career
- 1993–1994: T&T Club
- 1996–2005: T&T Club
- 2005: Dipali JS
- 2008: Bangladesh (assistant)
- 2013–2023: Bangladesh Women U14
- 2013–2023: Bangladesh Women U17
- 2009–2023: Bangladesh Women U20
- 2009–2023: Bangladesh Women
- 2023–2024: Bangladesh Army
- 2023–2024: Bangladesh Army Women
- 2024–: BFF Elite Academy
- 2025: Bangladesh U19
Medal record
Representing Bangladesh (manager)
Women's football
SAFF Women's Championship
Winner	2022 Nepal
Runner-up	2016 India
South Asian Games
Bronze medal – third place	2010 Bangladesh
Bronze medal – third place	2016 India
SAFF U-20 Women's Championship
Winner	2018 Bhutan
Winner	2021 Bangladesh
SAFF U-17 Women's Championship
Winner	2017 Bangladesh
Runner-up	2018 Bhutan
Runner-up	2019 Bhutan
Bangamata U-19 Women's International Gold Cup
Winner	2019 Bangladesh
- * Club domestic league appearances and goals

Golam Rabbani Choton (Bengali: গোলাম রব্বানী ছোটন) (born 2 July 1968) is a Bangladeshi professional football manager and former player who currently serves as the head coach of the BFF Elite Academy. He was the former head coach of Bangladesh women's under-14, Bangladesh women's under-17, Bangladesh women's under-20 and Bangladesh women's national football team. He is considered as the pioneer of Bangladesh women's football. Golam Robbani had played for Fakirerpool Young Men's Club and Arambagh KS for most of his playing career as a defender.

== Early years ==
Golam Rabbani Choton was born on 2 July 1968, in Bogra, Bangladesh and spent his childhood there. But, he and his family originally from Tangail.

== Career ==
In the 1983–84 season, he began his senior playing career by playing for Basabo Tarun Sangha, where he spent three seasons. Then, he joined Fakirerpool Young Men's Club in the 1987–88 season. After spending 3 seasons at Fakirerpool, he signed a contract with Wari Club Dhaka. Subsequently, he played for Fakirerpool and Arambagh KS. Most recently in the 2001–02 season, he joined BRTC Sports Club from Arambagh KS. He retired after playing only one season for BRTC.

== Managerial career ==
In 1993, Golam Rabbani made his debut as a manager of T&T Club. After stepping down as T&T's manager for just one season, he took over as T&T's manager again in the 1996–97 season, the second time he spent about 10 seasons as T&T's manager. He then joined Dipali Jubo Sangha as a manager. In 2009, he became the manager of the Bangladesh national women's team as well as the manager of the Bangladesh women's under-20 team. Later, he also became the manager of Bangladesh Women's Under-14 and Bangladesh women's under-17 teams. As a manager, he has won 7 titles so far, including the 2018 SAFF U-18 Women's Championship

Under his coaching, Bangladesh clinched their maiden SAFF Women's Championship title with a 3–1 victory over Nepal in an entertaining final at the Dasharath Rangasala in Kathmandu on 19 September 2022, and they became runner-up at the SAFF Women's Championship 2016. On 26 May 2023, Golam Rabbani Choton has brought shocking news as he has chosen to step down from his duties as head coach of the women's team after the end of May. Then, he took over Bangladesh Army football team as manager.

== Honours ==
=== Manager ===
- SAFF Women's Championship

Champion : 2022
Runner-up (1) : 2016

- South Asian Games

Bronze (2) : 2010, 2016

- SAFF U-20 Women's Championship

Champion (2) : 2018, 2021

- Bangamata U-19 Women's International Gold Cup

Champion (1) : 2019

- SAFF U-17 Women's Championship

Champion (1) : 2017
Runner-up (2) : 2018, 2019

- AFC U-14 Girls' Regional Championship – South and Central

Champion (2) : 2015, 2016

== See also ==
- Bangladesh women's national football team
- Bangladesh women's national under-20 football team
- Bangladesh women's national under-17 football team
- Bangladesh national football team
