= Tohura Khatun =

Bangladeshi women's football player (born 2003)

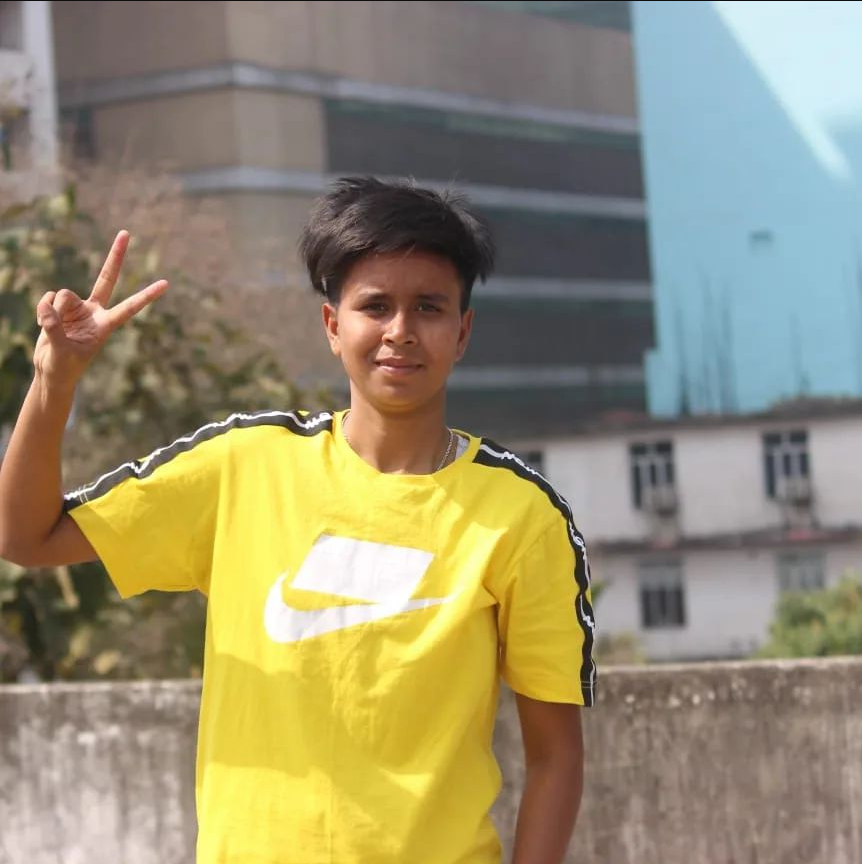
- Tohura Khatun in 2022

Personal information
- Date of birth: May 5, 2003 (age 23)
- Place of birth: Kolsindur, Mymensingh
- Height: 1.47 m (4 ft 10 in)
- Position: Forward

Team information
- Current team: Farashganj
- Number: 10

Youth career
- 2011–2014: Kalsindur Government Primary School

College career
Years	Team	Apps	(Gls)
2015–2016	Kolsindur High School		

Senior career*
Years	Team	Apps	(Gls)
2020–2021	Bashundhara Kings	20	(22)
2023–2024	ARB College	8	(11)
2025	Royal Thimphu College	6	(1)
2025–	Farashganj	8	(11)

International career^{‡}
2015–2016	Bangladesh U-14		(11)
2017–2018	Bangladesh U-15		(15)
2016–2019	Bangladesh U-16		(11)
2018–2022	Bangladesh U-19	10	(4)
2018–	Bangladesh	40	(15)
Medal record
Women's football
Representing Bangladesh
SAFF Women's Championship
Winner	2024 Nepal
Winner	2022 Nepal
SAFF U-18 Women's Championship
Winner	2018 Bhutan
Winner	2021 Bangladesh
Bangamata U-19 Women's International Gold Cup
Winner	2019 Bangladesh
AFC U-14 Girls' Regional (South and Central) Championship
First place	2015 Nepal
First place	2016 Tajikistan
SAFF U-15 Women's Championship
First place	2017 Bangladesh
Jockey CGI U-15 Youth Tournament
First place	2018 Hong Kong
- * Club domestic league appearances and goals as of 16 February 2026 ‡ National team caps and goals as of 6 June 2026

Tohura Khatun (Bengali: তহুরা খাতুন IPA: [tohuɾa kʰatun]; born 5 May 2003) is a Bangladeshi professional footballer who plays as a forward for Farashganj and the Bangladesh national team.

== Club career ==
=== Royal Thimphu College ===
In July 2025, Tohura joined Bhutan Women's National League club Royal Thimphu College.

=== Farashganj ===
In December 2025, Tohura joined Farashganj for the 2025–26 Bangladesh Women's Football League. She scored four goals in her debut for the club.

== International career ==
=== Youth ===
Tohura was a player of 2025 AFC U-14 Girls' Region (South & Central) Championship winning squad od Bangladesh. She managed to score one goal against Bhutan in the tournament. She later helped her team to retain the title in the next edition. She was the top scorer of 2026 AFC U-14 Girls' Regional (South & Central) Championship, where she scored 10 goals in 4 matches.

She was later selected for the Bangladesh U-15 team that won 2017 SAFF U-15 Women's Championship. She scored a hat-trick against Nepal in the opening match, which resulted in her becoming the top-scorer in the tournament.

She played a key role for Bangladesh U-15 to win 2018 Jockey CGI U-15 Youth Football Tournament in Hong Kong, which was the first ever invitational overseas trophy her team won.. She ended the four-nation tournament as the highest scorer with 8 goals from 3 matches.

She scored two goals against Iran and UAE during 2017 AFC U-16 Women's Championship qualification. Later she was selected for the final squad at the 2017 AFC U-16 Women's Championship.

== International goals ==
=== Bangladesh U-14 ===
Scores and results list Bangladesh's goal tally first.

No.	Date	Venue	Opponent	Score	Result	Competition
1	2015	Kathmandu, Nepal	Bhutan			2015 AFC U14 Girls' Regional Championship (South and Central)
2	26 April 2016	Aviator Stadium, Dushanbe, Tajikistan	India		3–1	2016 AFC U14 Girls' Regional Championship (South and Central)
3	26 April 2016	Aviator Stadium, Dushanbe, Tajikistan	India		3–1	2016 AFC U14 Girls' Regional Championship (South and Central)
4	28 April 2016	Aviator Stadium, Dushanbe, Tajikistan	Nepal		9-0	2016 AFC U14 Girls' Regional Championship (South and Central)
5	28 April 2016	Aviator Stadium, Dushanbe, Tajikistan	Nepal		9-0	2016 AFC U14 Girls' Regional Championship (South and Central)
6	30 April 2016	Aviator Stadium, Dushanbe, Tajikistan	Tajikistan		9-1	2016 AFC U14 Girls' Regional Championship (South and Central)
7	30 April 2016	Aviator Stadium, Dushanbe, Tajikistan	Tajikistan		9-1	2016 AFC U14 Girls' Regional Championship (South and Central)
8	30 April 2016	Aviator Stadium, Dushanbe, Tajikistan	Tajikistan		9-1	2016 AFC U14 Girls' Regional Championship (South and Central)
9	1 May 2016	Aviator Stadium, Dushanbe, Tajikistan	India	1–0	4-0	2016 AFC U14 Girls' Regional Championship (South and Central)
10	1 May 2016	Aviator Stadium, Dushanbe, Tajikistan	India	3-0	4-0	2016 AFC U14 Girls' Regional Championship (South and Central)
11	1 May 2016	Aviator Stadium, Dushanbe, Tajikistan	India	4-0	4-0	2016 AFC U14 Girls' Regional Championship (South and Central)

=== Bangladesh U-17 ===
Scores and results list Bangladesh's goal tally first.

No.	Date	Venue	Opponent	Score	Result	Competition
1	27 August 2016	Bangabandhu National Stadium, Dhaka, Bangladesh	Iran	3–0	3-0	2017 AFC U-16 Women's Championship qualification
2	3 September 2016	Bangabandhu National Stadium, Dhaka, Bangladesh	(United Arab Emirates) UAE	4–0	4-0	2017 AFC U-16 Women's Championship qualification
3	17 December 2017	BSSS Mostafa Kamal Stadium, Dhaka, Bangladesh	Nepal	3–0	6-0	2017 SAFF U-15 Women's Championship
4	17 December 2017	BSSS Mostafa Kamal Stadium, Dhaka, Bangladesh	Nepal	5-0	6-0	2017 SAFF U-15 Women's Championship
5	17 December 2017	BSSS Mostafa Kamal Stadium, Dhaka, Bangladesh	Nepal	6-0	6-0	2017 SAFF U-15 Women's Championship
6	30 March 2018	Siu Sai Wan Sports Ground, Hong Kong	Malaysia	2–0	10-1	2018 CGI U15 Youth Football Tournament
7	30 March 2018	Siu Sai Wan Sports Ground, Hong Kong	Malaysia	3-0	10-1	2018 CGI U15 Youth Football Tournament
8	31 March 2018	Siu Sai Wan Sports Ground, Hong Kong	Iran	1-0	8-1	2018 CGI U15 Youth Football Tournament
9	31 March 2018	Siu Sai Wan Sports Ground, Hong Kong	Iran	2-0	8-1	2018 CGI U15 Youth Football Tournament
10	31 March 2018	Siu Sai Wan Sports Ground, Hong Kong	Iran	3-0	8-1	2018 CGI U15 Youth Football Tournament
11	1 April 2018	Siu Sai Wan Sports Ground, Hong Kong	Hong Kong	1-0	6-0	2018 CGI U15 Youth Football Tournament
12	1 April 2018	Siu Sai Wan Sports Ground, Hong Kong	Hong Kong	3-0	6-0	2018 CGI U15 Youth Football Tournament
13	1 April 2018	Siu Sai Wan Sports Ground, Hong Kong	Hong Kong	6-0	6-0	2018 CGI U15 Youth Football Tournament
14	9 August 2018	Changlimithang Stadium, Thimphu, Bhutan	Pakistan	1–0	14-0	2018 SAFF U-15 Women's Championship
15	9 August 2018	Changlimithang Stadium, Thimphu, Bhutan	Pakistan	3-0	14-0	2018 SAFF U-15 Women's Championship
16	13 August 2018	Changlimithang Stadium, Thimphu, Bhutan	Nepal	1-0	3-0	2018 SAFF U-15 Women's Championship
17	16 August 2018	Changlimithang Stadium, Thimphu, Bhutan	Bhutan	3-0	5-0	2018 SAFF U-15 Women's Championship
18	17 September 2018	BSSS Mostafa Kamal Stadium, Dhaka, Bangladesh	Bahrain	10–0	10-0	2019 AFC U-16 Women's Championship qualification
19	19 September 2018	BSSS Mostafa Kamal Stadium, Dhaka, Bangladesh	Lebanon	3-0	8-0	2019 AFC U-16 Women's Championship qualification
20	23 September 2018	BSSS Mostafa Kamal Stadium, Dhaka, Bangladesh	Vietnam	1-0	2-0	2019 AFC U-16 Women's Championship qualification
21	27 February 2019	Mandalar Thiri Stadium, Mandalay, Myanmar	Philippines	1–0	10-0	2019 AFC U-16 Women's Championship qualification
22	27 February 2019	Mandalar Thiri Stadium, Mandalay, Myanmar	Philippines	2-0	10-0	2019 AFC U-16 Women's Championship qualification
23	27 February 2019	Mandalar Thiri Stadium, Mandalay, Myanmar	Philippines	4-0	10-0	2019 AFC U-16 Women's Championship qualification
24	27 February 2019	Mandalar Thiri Stadium, Mandalay, Myanmar	Philippines	5-0	10-0	2019 AFC U-16 Women's Championship qualification
25	21 September 2019	IPE Chonburi Stadium, Chonburi, Thailand	Australia	1–0	2-2	2019 AFC U-16 Women's Championship
26	21 September 2019	IPE Chonburi Stadium, Chonburi, Thailand	Australia	2-1	2-2	2019 AFC U-16 Women's Championship

=== Bangladesh U-20 ===
Scores and results list Bangladesh's goal tally first.

No.	Date	Venue	Opponent	Score	Result	Competition
1	30 September 2018	Changlimithang Stadium, Thimphu, Bhutan	Pakistan	16–0	17-0	2018 SAFF U-18 Women's Championship
2	30 April 2019	Bangabandhu National Stadium, Dhaka, Bangladesh	Mongolia	3–0	3-0	2019 Bangamata U-19 Women's Gold Cup
3	13 December 2021	BSSS Mostafa Kamal Stadium, Dhaka, Bangladesh	Bhutan	1–0	6-0	2021 SAFF U-19 Women's Championship
4	13 December 2021	BSSS Mostafa Kamal Stadium, Dhaka, Bangladesh	Bhutan	3-0	6-0	2021 SAFF U-19 Women's Championship

=== Bangladesh ===
As of match played 25 February 2026
Scores and results list Bangladesh's goal tally first, score column indicates score after each Tohura Khatun goal.

List of international goals scored by Tohura Khatun
No.	Date	Venue	Opponent	Score	Result	Competition
1	9 September 2021	Dasharath Rangasala, Kathmandu, Nepal	Nepal	1–2	1–2	Friendly
2	26 September 2021	JAR Stadium, Tashkent, Uzbekistan	Hong Kong	1–0	5–0	Friendly
3	16 September 2022	Dasharath Rangasala, Kathmandu, Nepal	Bhutan	7–0	8–0	2022 SAFF Women's Championship
4	1 December 2023	BSSSMK Stadium, Dhaka, Bangladesh	Singapore	2–0	3–0	Friendly
5	1 December 2023	BSSSMK Stadium, Dhaka, Bangladesh	Singapore	3–0	3–0	Friendly
6	4 December 2023	BSSSMK Stadium, Dhaka, Bangladesh	Singapore	1–0	8–0	Friendly
7	4 December 2023	BSSSMK Stadium, Dhaka, Bangladesh	Singapore	3–0	8–0	Friendly
8	23 October 2024	Dasharath Rangasala, Kathmandu, Nepal	India	2–0	3–1	2024 SAFF Championship
9	23 October 2024	Dasharath Rangasala, Kathmandu, Nepal	India	3–0	3–1	2024 SAFF Championship
10	27 October 2024	Dasharath Rangasala, Kathmandu, Nepal	Bhutan	2–0	7–1	2024 SAFF Championship
11	27 October 2024	Dasharath Rangasala, Kathmandu, Nepal	Bhutan	4–0	7–1	2024 SAFF Championship
12	27 October 2024	Dasharath Rangasala, Kathmandu, Nepal	Bhutan	6–1	7–1	2024 SAFF Championship
13	29 June 2025	Thuwunna Stadium, Yangon, Myanmar	Bahrain	4–0	7–0	AFC Women's Asian Cup qualification
14	29 June 2025	Thuwunna Stadium, Yangon, Myanmar	Bahrain	5–0	7–0	AFC Women's Asian Cup qualification
15	5 July 2025	Thuwunna Stadium, Yangon, Myanmar	Turkmenistan	6–0	7–0	AFC Women's Asian Cup qualification
-	25 February 2026	Marconi Stadium, Sydney, Australia	(Australia) Western Sydney Wanderers FC		1–1	Unofficial Friendly

== Honours ==
Royal Thimphu College

- Bhutan Women's National League: 2025

Bangladesh U-20

- SAFF Women's Championship: 2021

Bangladesh

- SAFF Women's Championship: 2022, 2024

=== Individual ===
Bangladesh Women's Football League Best Player: 2020
