= Julan Nongmaithem =

Indian footballer (born 2011)

Personal information
- Date of birth: 15 February 2011 (age 15)
- Place of birth: Manipur, India
- Height: 1.66 m (5 ft 5 in)
- Position: Midfielder

Team information
- Current team: Kickstart

Youth career
- 2024: Manipur

Senior career*
Years	Team	Apps	(Gls)
2024–2025	Indian Arrows women	8	(0)
2026–	Kickstart		

International career^{‡}
2025–	India U17	12	(5)
2025–	India	1	(0)
- * Club domestic league appearances and goals ‡ National team caps and goals as of 27 October 2025

Julan Nongmaithem (born 15 February 2011) is an Indian professional footballer who plays as a midfielder for the Indian Women's League club Kickstart, the India women national U-17 team as well as the India women national team.

== Career ==
=== Youth career ===
Nongmaithem represented Manipur at the Sub Junior Girls' National Football Championship and captained the side. Under her leadership, Manipur won the Tier-1 championship after defeating Jharkhand by 7–5 in the final. Nongmaithem scored 5 goals from 5 matches in the championship, which includes 2 goals in the final.

=== Club career ===
In 2025, All India Football Federation (AIFF) decided to put it is developmental team Indian Arrows (women) in the Indian Women's League 2 (IWL2), the second tier women's professional league of India. However, the team was predominantly the India under-17 team under the guidance of Joakim Alexandersson. It was mainly to prepare the team for then upcoming 2025 SAFF U-17 Women's Championship, followed by the 2026 AFC U-17 Women's Asian Cup qualification. Following Nongmaithem's performance in the Sub Junior championship, she was selected in the Arrows team that would participate in the 2024–25 season. Nongmaithem also captained the Arrows in the final round of this season. She played a total of 8 matches in the group stage & final round and won 6 of them, thus became the runners-up of this season.

== International career ==
=== India U-17 team ===
Following the 2024–25 IWL2, Nongmaithem was also included in the final squad of U-17 national side. Alexendersson also made her the captain of the side. She scored her maiden goal on her debut for the national side in a 7–0 victory against Nepal on 20 August 2025. She successfully led the team to become the 2025 SAFF U-17 Women's Champion, winning 5 out the 6 matches.

On 6 October 2025, Alexandersson named the 23-member squad for 2026 AFC U-17 Women's Asian Cup qualifiers. Nongmaithem was again made the captain of the side. She again successfully lead the team to victory. She played important role in winning both the matches against Kyrgyzstan and Uzbekistan, thus qualified for the 2026 AFC U-17 Women's Asian Cup. She scored a goal against Kyrgyzstan.

Following the SAFF U-17 victory, AIFF decided that the U-17 team would participate in the 2026 SAFF U-19 Women's Championship instedd of the U-19 team, as a preparation for the 2026 AFC U-17 Women's Asian Cup. Nongmaithem again lead the team to victory under the guidance of then new coach Pamela Conti. They won this edition of SAFF U-19 by defeating Bangladesh U-19 team by 4–0 in the final, where Nongmaithem scored the opening goal for India.

=== Senior team ===
On 26 October 2025, the then coach of India women's national team, Crispin Chettri announced the squad for friendlies against Nepal and Iran. Nongmaithem was included in the squad based on her performance at the SAFF U-17 and AFC U-17 qualifiers. This was her maiden call-up for the senior team. She made her debut in the 1–2 defeat against Nepal on 27 October 2025. She became the youngest footballer to play in a senior international match for India at the age of 14 years 300 days, surpassing the record of Bembem Devi Oinam who made her debut at the age of 15 years 206 days in 1995.

== Career statistics ==
=== Club ===
As of match played on 15 May 2025

Appearances and goals by club, season and competition
Club	Season	League			National Cup		Continental		Other		Total	
Club	Season	Division	Apps	Goals	Apps	Goals	Apps	Goals	Apps	Goals	Apps	Goals
Indian Arrows Women	2024–25	Indian Women's League 2	8	0	—						8	0
Career total			8	0	0	0	0	0	0	0	8	0

=== International ===
As of 27 October 2025

National team	Year	Caps	Goals
India	2025	1	0
Total		1	0

== Honours ==
=== Club ===
Manipur

- Sub Junior Girls' National Football Championship: Champion (2024–25)

Indian Arrows

- Indian Women's League 2: Runners-up (2024–25)

=== National Team ===
India U-17

- SAFF U-17 Women's Championship: Champion (2025)
- SAFF U-20 Women's Championship: Champion (2026)
