= 2024 SAFF U-16 Women's Championship =

Tournament details
- Host country: Nepal
- City: Lalitpur
- Dates: 1–10 March 2024
- Teams: 4 (from 1 sub-confederation)
- Venue: 1

Final positions
- Champions: Bangladesh (2nd title)
- Runners-up: India

Tournament statistics
- Matches played: 7
- Goals scored: 34 (4.86 per match)
- Attendance: 1,140 (163 per match)
- Top scorer(s): (Bangladesh) Sauravi Akanda Prity (India) Anushka Kumari (5 goals each)
- Best player: (Bangladesh) Sauravi Akanda Prity
- Best goalkeeper: (Bangladesh) Yearzan Begum
- Fair play award: Bhutan

The 2024 SAFF U-16 Women's Championship was 6th edition of SAFF U-16 Women's Championship, an international football competition for women's under-16 national teams, organized by SAFF. The tournament were played in Nepal from 1–10 March 2024. Four teams from the region participated in the tournament.

In the previous edition, invitee team Russia won the championship after defeating India by 2–0 in the final. Bangladesh became the champion by defeating India by (3)1–1(2) goals penalties shootout in the final on 10 March 2024.

== Host selection ==
At the SAFF Executive Committee meeting, held on 10 January 2024 in the Dhaka, Bangladesh SAFF announced the name of Nepal host country of the tournament.

== Participating nations ==
The following four nations were participated in the tournament.

Team	Appearances in the SAFF U-16 Women's Championship	Previous best performance
Bangladesh	6th	Champions (2017)
Bhutan	6th	3rd place (2018)
India	5th	Champions (2018, 2019)
Nepal (Host)	6th	Champions (2022)

== Venue ==
All matches were played at ANFA Complex Lalitpur, Nepal.

Lalitpur	2024 SAFF U-16 Women's Championship is located in Nepal
ANFA Complex	2024 SAFF U-16 Women's Championship is located in Nepal
Capacity: 4,000	2024 SAFF U-16 Women's Championship is located in Nepal

== Players eligibility ==
Players born on or after 1 January 2009 are eligible to compete in the tournament. Each team has to register a squad of minimum 16 players and maximum 23 players, minimum two of whom must be goalkeepers.

== Match officials ==
Referees

- (Bangladesh) Jaya Chakma
- (India) Sen Hangma Subba
- (Nepal) Maya Lama
- (Nepal) Meera Tamang

Assistant Referees

- (Bangladesh) Shohana Khatun
- (Bhutan) Sonam Palden
- (India) Elangbam Debala Devi
- (Nepal) Merina Dhimal

== Round robin ==
Single round-robin, each team played each other. The top teams contest in the final.

Key to colours in league table define Champion
Champion

Tiebreakers

Teams are ranked according to points (3 points for a win, 1 point for a draw, 0 points for a loss), and if tied on points, the following tiebreaking criteria are applied, in the order given, to determine the rankings.

1. Points in head-to-head matches among tied teams;
2. Goal difference in head-to-head matches among tied teams;
3. Goals scored in head-to-head matches among tied teams;
4. If more than two teams are tied, and after applying all head-to-head criteria above, a subset of teams are still tied, all head-to-head criteria above are reapplied exclusively to this subset of teams;
5. Goal difference in all group matches;
6. Goals scored in all group matches;
7. Penalty shoot-out if only two teams are tied and they met in the last round of the group;
8. Disciplinary points (yellow card = 1 point, red card as a result of two yellow cards = 3 points, direct red card = 3 points, yellow card followed by direct red card = 4 points).

=== League table ===
Pos	Team	Pld	W	D	L	GF	GA	GD	Pts	Status
1	Bangladesh	3	3	0	0	11	1	+10	9	Qualified for Final
2	India	3	2	0	1	18	3	+15	6	Qualified for Final
3	Nepal	3	1	0	2	3	12	−9	3	
4	Bhutan	3	0	0	3	0	16	−16	0	

Source: GSA

== Matches ==
1 March 2024
15:00

India	7–0	Bhutan
Shveta Rani 6', 27'; Pearl Fernandes 13', 26'; Anushka Kumari 17', 40'; Anwita Raghuraman 61'	Report

ANFA Complex, Lalitpur
Attendance: 231
Referee: Jaya Chakma (Bangladesh)

2 March 2024
15:00

Nepal	0–2	Bangladesh
	Report	Prity 24', 31'

ANFA Complex, Lalitpur
Attendance: 103
Referee: Meera Tamang (Bhutan)

4 March 2024
15:00

Bhutan	0–3	Nepal
	Report	Puja Giri 14'; Bhumika Budathoki 18'; Gyanshu Dolma Lo 31'

ANFA Complex, Lalitpur
Attendance: 150
Referee: Sen Hangma Subba (India)

5 March 2024
15:00

Bangladesh	3–1	India
Alpi Akter 9'; Prity 78'; Arpita Bishwas 89'	Report	Anushka Kumari 55'

ANFA Complex, Lalitpur
Attendance: 200
Referee: Maya Lama (Nepal)

7 March 2024
15:00

India	10–0	Nepal
Anita Dungdung 3'; Pearl Fernandes 14', 43'; Anushka Kumari 22'; Bonifilia Shullai 25'; Gurleen Kaur Sidhu 33', 77'; Min Maya Shrestha 46' (o.g.); Gurnaz Kaur 58'; Rheanna Liz Jacob 79'	Report

ANFA Complex, Lalitpur
Attendance: 200
Referee: Jaya Chakma (Bangladesh)

8 March 2024
15:00

Bangladesh	6–0	Bhutan
Prity 13', 77'; Fatema Akter 32'; Kranuching Marma 35'; Sathi Munda 47'; Thuinuye Marma 69'	Report

ANFA Complex, Lalitpur
Attendance: 50
Referee: Sen Hangma Subba (India)

== Final ==
10 March 2024
15:00

Bangladesh	1–1	India
Mariam Binte Hanna 71'	Report	Anushka Kumari 5'
Penalties
Prity (penalty missed); Mariam Binte Hanna (penalty scored); Thuinuye Marma (penalty scored); Alpi Akter (penalty missed); Sathi Munda (penalty scored)	3–2	(penalty scored) Shveta Rani; (penalty missed) Alena Devi Sarangthem; (penalty missed) Bonifilia Shullai; (penalty scored) Anwita Raghuraman; (penalty missed) Divyani Linda

ANFA Complex, Lalitpur
Attendance: 206
Referee: Maya Lama (Nepal)

== Winners ==
2024 SAFF U-16 Women's Championship Champions

Bangladesh
Second title

== Awards ==
The following awards were given at the conclusion of the tournament:

Most Valuable Player	Best Goalkeeper	Fair Play Award
(Bangladesh) Sauravi Akanda Prity	(Bangladesh) Yearzan Begum	Bhutan

== Statistics ==
=== Goalscorers ===
There have been 34 goals scored in 7 matches, for an average of 4.86 goals per match.

5 goals

- (Bangladesh) Sauravi Akanda Prity
- (India) Anushka Kumari

4 goals

- (India) Pearl Fernandes

2 goals

- (India) Shveta Rani
- (India) Gurleen Kaur Sidhu

1 goal

- (Bangladesh) Mariam Binta Hanna
- (Bangladesh) Fatema Akter
- (Bangladesh) Kranuching Marma
- (Bangladesh) Sathi Munda
- (Bangladesh) Thuinuye Marma
- (Bangladesh) Alpi Akter
- (Bangladesh) Arpita Bishwas
- (India) Anwita Raghuraman
- (India) Anita Dungdung
- (India) Bonifilia Shullai
- (India) Gurnaz Kaur
- (India) Rheanna Liz Jacob
- (Nepal) Gyanshu Dolmalo
- (Nepal) Bhumika Budathoki
- (Nepal) Puja Giri

1 own goal

- (Nepal) Min Maya Shrestha (Against India)

Source: GSA

== See also ==
- 2024 SAFF U-17 Championship
- 2024 SAFF U-20 Championship
- 2024 SAFF U-19 Women's Championship
- 2024 SAFF Women's Championship
