= SAFF U-17 Women's Championship =

- Founded: 2017; 9 years ago
- Region: South Asia (SAFF)
- Teams: 7
- Related competitions: SAFF U-20 Championship
- Current champions: India (3rd title)
- Most championships: India (3 titles)
- 2026 SAFF U-17 Women's Championship

The SAFF U-15/U-16/U-17 Women's Championship is an annual association football tournament for women's national teams under the age of 15/16/17. The tournament is organized by South Asian Football Federation (SAFF).

== History ==
The tournament began in 2017 and is hosted every other year. For 2021, the decision was made to make the tournament a U-16 tournament versus the previous three iterations which had been U-15. However, the tournament was ultimately postponed. Later, Bangladesh was declared to be the host of the 4th edition, which is going to take place in U-15 format on late 2022.

== Results ==
| Ed. | Year | Cat. | Host | Final | | | Third place playoff | | | No. of teams |
| Ed. | Year | Cat. | Host | Champion | Score | Runner-up | Third place | Score | Fourth place | No. of teams |
| 1 | 2017 | U-15 | Bangladesh | Bangladesh | 1–0 | India | Bhutan | ^{RR} | Nepal | 4 |
| 2 | 2018 | U-15 | Bhutan | India | 1–0 | Bangladesh | Bhutan | 2–2 (4–3 p) | Nepal | 6 |
| 3 | 2019 | U-15 | Bhutan | India | 0–0 (5–3 p) | Bangladesh | Nepal | ^{RR} | Bhutan | 4 |
| 4 | 2022 | U-15 | Bangladesh | Nepal | ^{RR} | Bangladesh | Bhutan | | | 3 |
| 5 | 2023 | U-17 | Bangladesh | Russia | ^{RR} | Bangladesh | India | ^{RR} | Nepal | 5 |
| 6 | 2024 | U-16 | Nepal | Bangladesh | 1–1 (3–2 p) | India | Nepal | ^{RR} | Bhutan | 4 |
| 7 | 2025 | U-17 | Bhutan | India | ^{RR} | Bangladesh | Nepal | ^{RR} | Bhutan | 4 |
| 8 | 2026 | U-17 | Bhutan | | | | | | | |

== Participating nations ==
Legend

- **1st** – Champions
- **2nd** – Runners-up
- **3rd** – Third place
- **4th** – Fourth place
- GS – Group stage
- q – Qualified for upcoming tournament
- — Hosts
- × – Did not enter
- • – Did not qualify
- × – Withdrew before qualification
- — Withdrew after qualification
- — Disqualified after qualification

| Team | (Bangladesh) 2017 | (Bhutan) 2018 | (Bhutan) 2019 | (Bangladesh) 2022 | (Bangladesh) 2023 | (Nepal) 2024 | (Bhutan) 2025 | Total |
|---|---|---|---|---|---|---|---|---|
| Bangladesh | **1st** | **2nd** | **2nd** | **2nd** | **2nd** | **1st** | **2nd** | 7 |
| Bhutan | **GS** | **3rd** | **4th** | **3rd** | **5th** | **4th** | **4th** | 7 |
| India | **2nd** | **1st** | **1st** | × | **3rd** | **2nd** | **1st** | 6 |
| Maldives | x | x | x | x | x | x | × | 0 |
| Nepal | **4th** | **4th** | **3rd** | **1st** | **4th** | **3rd** | **3rd** | 7 |
| Pakistan | x | GS | x | x | x | x | × | 1 |
| Sri Lanka | x | GS | x | x | x | x | × | 1 |
Guest team
| Russia | x | x | x | x | **1st** | x | × | 1 |

=== Performance by nation ===
Bold: Indicates host.

| Nation | Champions | Runners-up | Third-place | Fourth-place |
|---|---|---|---|---|
| India | 3 (2018, 2019, 2025) | 2 (2017, 2024) | 1 (2023) | —N/a |
| Bangladesh | 2 (**2017**, 2024) | 5 (2018, 2019, **2022**, **2023**, 2025) | —N/a | —N/a |
| Nepal | 1 (2022) | —N/a | 3 (2019, **2024**, 2025) | 3 (2017, 2018, 2023) |
| Russia | 1 (2023) | —N/a | —N/a | —N/a |
| Bhutan | —N/a | —N/a | 3 (2017, **2018**, 2022) | 3 (**2019**, 2024, **2025**) |

== Awards ==
| Year | Most Valuable Player | Top scorer(s) | | Best Goalkeeper | Fair play award |
| Year | Most Valuable Player | Player(s) | Goals | Best Goalkeeper | Fair play award |
|---|---|---|---|---|---|
| 2017 | (Bangladesh) Akhi Khatun | (India) Priyangka Devi Naorem | 4 | Not awarded | Bangladesh |
| 2018 | (India) Priyangka Devi Naorem | (India) Shilky Devi Hemam (Bangladesh) Shamsunnahar Jr. (Bangladesh) Tohura Khatun (Nepal) Chandra Bandari | 4 | Not awarded | Bangladesh |
| 2019 | (Bangladesh) Rupna Chakma | (India) Lynda Kom | 4 | Not awarded | Bhutan |
| 2022 | (Bangladesh) Sauravi Akanda Prity | (Bangladesh) Sauravi Akanda Prity | 9 | (Nepal) Sujata Tamang | Bangladesh |
| 2023 | (Russia) Elena Golik | (India) Shilji Shaji | 8 | (Nepal) Sujata Tamang | India |
| 2024 | (Bangladesh) Sauravi Akanda Prity | (Bangladesh) Sauravi Akanda Prity (India) Anushka Kumari | 5 | (Bangladesh) Yearzan Begum | Bhutan |
| 2025 | (India) Abhista Basnett | (India) Anushka Kumari | 8 | (Bangladesh) Meghla Rani Roy | Bangladesh |

== Winning coaches ==
| Year | Team | Coach |
|---|---|---|
| 2017 | Bangladesh | (Bangladesh) Golam Robbani Choton |
| 2018 | India | (India) Biby Thomas Muttath |
| 2019 | India | (India) Biby Thomas Muttath |
| 2022 | Nepal | (Nepal) Bhagwati Rana Magar |
| 2023 | Russia | (Russia) Elena Medved |
| 2024 | Bangladesh | (Bangladesh) Saiful Bari Titu |
| 2025 | India | (Sweden) Joakim Alexandersson |

== See also ==
- SAFF Championship
- SAFF U-20 Championship
- SAFF U-17 Championship
- SAFF Women's Championship
- SAFF U-20 Women's Championship
