= Shilji Shaji =

Indian footballer (born 2007)

Personal information
- Date of birth: 13 March 2007 (age 19)
- Place of birth: Kakkayam, Kozhikode, Kerala, India
- Height: 1.53 m (5 ft 0 in)
- Position: Forward

Team information
- Current team: Gokulam Kerala
- Number: 20

Senior career*
Years	Team	Apps	(Gls)
2022–	Gokulam Kerala	14	(2)

International career
2023	India U17	6	(16)
2025	India U20	3	(0)
- * Club domestic league appearances and goals as of 18 May 2026

Shilji Shaji (born 13 March 2007) is an Indian professional footballer who plays for Gokulam Kerala and the India U17. She won the 2022–23 AIFF Emerging Player of the Year award.

== Early life ==
Shilji hails from Kakkayam, Kozhikode, Kerala and started playing football at Kallanode School. She said, "My father played football, and he sent me to play as well. Very few girls of my age used to play football. So I mostly played with senior girls".

== Career ==
=== Gokulam Kerala ===
Shilji progressed through the girls' academy at Gokulam . She made her senior debut during the 2025–26 Indian Women's League season aged 18, was introduced as a substitute against Nita on 20 December 2025.

== International career ==
She was called up to the India U17. Shilji scored her first goal for India U17 team in a friendly match against Jordan on 6 February 2023, ultimately scoring four goals in this game. Shilji also scored another four goals in the next match against the same opponent on 9 February 2023. Shilji scored a hat trick as India beat Nepal emphatically in the 2023 SAFF U-17 Women's Championship. Shilji got to her fourth hat trick for the U-17 team against Bhutan in the 2023 SAFF U-17 Women's Championship. She was called for 2024 AFC U-17 Women's Asian Cup qualification Team, Later AIFF announced Nishima Kumari of Jharkhand as replacement for attacking midfielder Shilji Shaji, who was diagnosed with viral pneumonia.

== Honours ==
Individual

- Top Scorer :2023 SAFF U-17 Women's Championship
