= Bhutan women's national under-17 football team =

Bhutan Women's U-17
- Association: Bhutan Football Federation
- Confederation: AFC (Asia)
- Sub-confederation: SAFF (South Asia)
- Head coach: Anju Turambekar
- Home stadium: Changlimithang Stadium
- FIFA code: BHU
First colours	Second colours

First international
- India 3–0 Bhutan (Dhaka, Bangladesh; 17 December 2017)

Biggest win
- Bhutan 6–0 Sri Lanka (Thimphu, Bhutan; 11 August 2018)

Biggest defeat
- Bhutan 1–10 India (Thimphu, Bhutan; 11 October 2019); Bangladesh 9–0 Bhutan (Dhaka, Bangladesh; 7 November 2022); India 9–0 Bhutan (Dhaka, Bangladesh; 26 March 2023)

SAFF U-17 Women's Championship
- Appearances: 7 (first in 2017)
- Best result: 3rd place (2017, 2018, 2022)

The Bhutan women's national under-17 football team represents Bhutan in women's international under-17 football. The team is controlled by the governing body for football in Bhutan, the Bhutan Football Federation. The team participate AFC U-17 Women's Asian Cup and SAFF U-17 Women's Championship.

== History ==
The Bhutan national women's under-17 football represents Bhutan in the women's U-17 level. They are the very weakest team in the South Asian Football Federation. The team have not yet qualified to the FIFA U-17 Women's World Cup and AFC U-17 Women's Asian Cup. They are only play SAFF U-17 Women's Championship and 2018 and 2019 the team finished third position.

== Team staff ==
As of 2026

Position	Name
Head coach/technical director	(India) Anju Turambekar
Assistant coach	(Bhutan) Sherab Gyelmo
Goalkeeper coach	(Bhutan) Hari Gurung
Strength and conditioning coach	(Bhutan) Ngawang Chozom
Physiotherapist	(India) Arwin Hanse
Team manager	(Bhutan) Karma Choki
Media officer	(Bhutan) Choki Dorji

== Fixtures and results ==
Legend

Win Draw Loss Fixtures

== Competitive record ==
=== FIFA U-17 Women's World Cup ===
FIFA U-17 Women's World Cup record
Year	Result	Position	Pld	W	D	L	GF	GA
(New Zealand) 2008	Did not qualify							
(Trinidad and Tobago) 2010	Did not qualify							
(Azerbaijan) 2012	Did not qualify							
(Costa Rica) 2014	Did not qualify							
(Jordan) 2016	Did not qualify							
(Uruguay) 2018	Did not qualify							
(India) 2022	Did not qualify							
(Dominican Republic) 2024	withdrawn							
(Morocco) 2025	Did not qualify							
(Morocco) 2026	Did not qualify							
(Morocco) 2027	Did not qualify							
Total	0/9	0 Titles	0	0	0	0	0	0

*Draws include knockout matches decided on penalty kicks.

=== AFC U-17 Women's Asian Cup ===
AFC U-17 Women's Asian Cup record
Year	Round	Position	MP	W	D*	L	GF	GA
(Japan) 2005 to (China) 2027	Did not qualify							
Total	–	0/9	0	0	0	0	0	0

*Draws include knockout matches decided on penalty kicks.

=== AFC U-17 Women's Asian Cup qualification ===
AFC U-17 Women's Championship qualification record
Year	Round	Position	MP	W	D*	L	GF	GA
(Japan) 2005 to (Thailand) 2019	Did not participate							
(Indonesia) 2022	Did not held due to COVID-19 pandemic							
(Indonesia) 2024	Did not qualify							
Total	–	0/9	0	0	0	0	0	0

*Draws include knockout matches decided on penalty kicks.

=== SAFF U-15/U-16/U-17 Women's Championship ===
SAFF U-15/16/17 Women's Championship record
Year	Result	Position	Pld	W	D	L	GF	GA
(Bangladesh) 2017	3rd Place	3/4	3	0	1	2	1	7
(Bhutan) 2018	3rd Place	3/6	5	2	0	3	8	8
(Bhutan) 2019	4th Place	4/4	3	0	1	2	2	13
(Bangladesh) 2022	3rd Place	3/3	4	0	0	4	0	25
(Bangladesh) 2023	5th Place	5/5	4	0	0	4	2	31
(Nepal) 2024	4th Place	4/4	3	0	0	3	0	16
(Bhutan) 2025	4th Place	4/4	6	0	2	4	4	20
Total	7/7	0 Title	28	2	4	22	17	120
