= Sauravi Akanda Prity =

Bangladeshi footballer

Personal information
- Date of birth: November 28, 2008 (age 17)
- Place of birth: Nandail Upazila, Mymensingh District, Bangladesh
- Height: 1.60 m (5 ft 3 in)
- Position: Forward

Team information
- Current team: Rajshahi Stars
- Number: 11

Youth career
- 2018: Panchrukhi Government Primary School
- 2019–: BKSP

Senior career*
Years	Team	Apps	(Gls)
2021	Bashundhara Kings		
2022	Siraj Srity Songsod		
2023–2024	ARB College	8	(6)
2025	Nasrin	0	(0)
2025–	Rajshahi Stars	9	(12)

International career^{‡}
2022–2025	Bangladesh U-17	23	(25)
2023–	Bangladesh U-20	5	(0)
2025–	Bangladesh	7	(1)
Medal record
Women's football
Representing Bangladesh
SAFF U-20 Women's Championship
Runner-up	2026 Bangladesh
Winner	2023 Bangladesh
SAFF U-17 Women's Championship
Winner	2024 Nepal
- * Club domestic league appearances and goals as of 19 February 2026 ‡ National team caps and goals as of 3 June 2026

Sauravi Akanda Prity (Bengali: সৌরভী আকন্দ প্রীতি IPA: [ʃouɾobʱi akɔndo pɾiti]; born 28 November 2008) is a Bangladeshi professional footballer who plays as a forward for Rajshahi Stars and the Bangladesh national team.

== Early career ==
Prity comes from Bargharia village in Jahangirpur Union of Nandail Upazila of Mymensingh District. In 2018, she captained Panchrukhi Government Primary School to victory in the Bangamata Gold Cup Tournament. She subsequently got the chance to represent Bangladesh at age levels.

Prity joined BKSP in 2019.

== Club career ==
=== Bashundhara Kings ===
In 2021, Prity joined Bashundhara Kings.

=== Siraj Srity Songsod ===
Prity joined Siraj Srity Songsod for the 2021–2022 season and scored a hat-trick against Brahmanbaria.

=== Nasrin ===
Prity was included in the Nasrin squad for 2025 SAFF Women's Club Championship.

=== Rajshahi Stars ===
On 22 December 2025, she joined Rajshahi Stars before the 2025–26 Bangladesh Women's Football League season. She scored twice for the club in her debut match.

== International career ==
=== Youth ===
Prity was the top scorer of the 2022 SAFF U-15 Women's Championship, finishing with 9 goals in 4 matches in the tournament.

In the 2024 SAFF U-16 Women's Championship, she was awarded Best Player of the Tournament after finishing as the competition's top scorer with 5 goals.

She represented Bangladesh at the 2025 SAFF U-17 Women's Championship, where she scored a hat-trick.

=== Senior ===
Prity scored her first senior international goal for Bangladesh against Maldives during the 2026 SAFF Women's Championship.

== Statistics ==
=== International goals ===
No.	Date	Venue	Opponent	Score	Result	Competition
1.	28 May 2026	Jawaharlal Nehru Stadium, Margao, India	Maldives	3–2	4–2	2026 SAFF Women's Championship

== Honours ==
Bashundhara Kings

- Bangladesh Women's Football League: 2020–21

Rajshahi Stars

- Bangladesh Women's Football League: 2025–26

Individual

- SAFF U-17 Women's Championship Top Scorer: 2024
