= Nepal women's national under-17 football team =

Women's national association football team representing Nepal

Nepal Women's U-17
- Nickname: Nepali Chelis
- Association: All Nepal Football Association
- Confederation: AFC (Asia)
- Sub-confederation: SAFF (South Asia)
- Home stadium: Various
- FIFA code: NEP
First colours	Second colours

First international
- Bangladesh 6–0 Nepal (Dhaka, Bangladesh; 17 December 2017)

Biggest win
- Nepal 7–0 Bhutan (Dhaka, Bangladesh; 3 November 2022)

Biggest defeat
- Thailand 12–0 Nepal (Chonburi, Thailand; 17 October 2025)

SAFF U-17 Women's Championship
- Appearances: 7 (first in 2017)
- Best result: Champions (2022)

The Nepal women's U-17 national football team, otherwise known as Nepali Cheli's (Nepalese Sisters) is controlled by the All Nepal Football Association and represents Nepal in women's international football competitions. The Women's Football Department is developed to control and manage the women's football activities. The official motto of women's football in Nepal is "Football for Change". It is a member of the Asian Football Confederation and the South Asian Football Federation and has yet to qualify for the Asian Cup.

== History ==
The team played their debut game against Bangladesh on 17 December 2017 in 2017 SAFF U-15 Women's Championship which they lost by 6–0 margin. They finished last in the group stage, losing to India by 10–0 margin and then gained their first ever points in the tournament by drawing 1–1 against Bhutan.

In the next edition of the tournament, Nepal qualified for the semi-finals for the first time but went down to India by narrow margin of 2–1 following which Nepal played third-place game against Bhutan which they lost in penalty shootout. During the same tournament, head coach Sanoj Shreshtha made it clear that Nepali players were not overaged.

== Coaches ==
=== Coaching staff ===
As of 13 July 2025

Position	Name
Head coach	(Nepal) Sanjeet Singh
Assistant coach	(Nepal) Naresh Thapa
Assistant coach	(Nepal) Ritesh Malla
Goalkeeper coach	(Nepal) Chandra Devi Dahal
Team Manager	(Nepal) Niru Thapa

== Current squad ==
The following players were called up for the 2024 AFC U-17 Women's Asian Cup qualification

No.	Pos.	Player	Date of birth (age)	Caps	Goals	Club
	GK	Jharna Dumrakoti				(All Nepal Football Association) APF
	GK	Sunita Sengtan				
	GK	Laxmi Oli				
	DF	Dikshya Rayamajhi				
	DF	Rejina Lama				
	DF	Mina Chand				
	DF	Kritisha Tamang				(All Nepal Football Association) Karnali Province
	DF	Anshu BK				(All Nepal Football Association) Waling Municipality
	DF	Min Maya Shestha				
	DF	Alija BK				
	DF	Gyanshu Dolma Lo				
	MF	Bhumika Budathoki				(All Nepal Football Association) Karnali Province
	MF	Ashika Karki				(All Nepal Football Association) Koshi Province
	MF	Babtika Karki				
	MF	Ayusha Reule				
	MF	Diki Kumari Syangbo Tamang				
	MF	Ayusha Gurung				(All Nepal Football Association) Waling Municipality
	MF	Rabina BK				(All Nepal Football Association) Waling Municipality
	MF	Sabina Tamang				(All Nepal Football Association) Bhojpur Municipality
	FW	Puja Giri				
	FW	Anita Rana Magar				
	FW	Yam Kumari BK				(All Nepal Football Association) Waling Municipality
	FW	Purnima Tharu				

== Recent results and fixtures ==
The following is a list of match results in the last 12 months, as well as any future matches that have been scheduled.

Legend

Win Draw Loss Fixture

== Competitive record ==
=== FIFA U-17 Women's World Cup ===
FIFA U-17 World Cup finals record										FIFA U-20 World Cup qualifying record								
Year	Result	Pts	Pld	W	D	L	GF	GA	GD	Result	Pts	Pld	W	D	L	GF	GA	GD
(New Zealand) 2008 to (Uruguay) 2018	did not qualify									Qualification based on AFC U-17 Women's Asian Cup's Result								
(India) 2021	Cancelled due to COVID-19 Pandemic									Cancelled due to COVID-19 Pandemic								
(India) 2022	did not qualify									Qualification based on AFC U-17 Women's Asian Cup's Result								
(Dominican Republic) 2024	did not qualify									Qualification based on AFC U-17 Women's Asian Cup's Result								
(Morocco) 2025	did not qualify									Qualification based on AFC U-17 Women's Asian Cup's Result								
Total	0/9	0	0	0	0	0	0	0	0	-	0	0	0	0	0	0	0	0

=== AFC U-17 Women's Asian Cup ===
AFC U-17 Championship finals record										AFC U-17 Championship qualifying record								
Year	Result	Pts	Pld	W	D	L	GF	GA	GD	Result	Pts	Pld	W	D	L	GF	GA	GD
(South Korea) 2005	No Qualification Process									No Qualification Process								
(Malaysia) 2007	No Qualification Process									No Qualification Process								
(Thailand) 2009 to (Thailand) 2017	Did not enter									Did not enter								
(Thailand) 2019	Did not qualify									Group E (4th)	1	3	0	1	2	5	19	-14
(Indonesia) 2022	Cancelled due to COVID-19 Pandemic									Qualification Cancelled due to COVID-19 Pandemic								
(Indonesia) 2024	Did not qualify									Group H (2nd)	3	2	1	0	1	4	2	+2
(China) 2026	TBD									Group F	TBD							
Total	0/10	0	0	0	0	0	0	0	0	3/8	4	5	1	1	3	9	21	-13

=== SAFF U-17 Women's Championship ===
SAFF U-17 Women's Championship
Host/Year	Result	Position	GP	W	D	L	GS	GA	GD
(Bangladesh) 2017	Group Stage	4th	3	0	1	2	1	17	-16
(Bhutan) 2018	Semi final	4th	3	1	0	2	5	5	0
(Bhutan) 2019	Semi final	3rd	3	0	1	2	4	7	-3
(Bangladesh) 2022	Champion	2nd	4	3	1	0	10	1	+9
(Bangladesh) 2023	Fourth	3rd	4	1	1	2	7	8	-1
(Nepal) 2024	Third	3rd	3	1	0	2	3	12	-9
(Bhutan) 2025	Third	3rd	6	1	1	4	4	21	-17
Total	1 Title	6/6	26	7	5	14	34	71	-37

== Honours ==
- AFC U-14 Girls’ Regional (Central and South) Championship

Champion (1): 2014
Runners-up (1) :2015
