= Sumati Kumari =

Indian footballer

Personal information
- Date of birth: 15 January 2004 (age 22)
- Place of birth: Londra, Jharkhand, India
- Position: Forward

Team information
- Current team: Sethu
- Number: 25

Senior career*
Years	Team	Apps	(Gls)
- Sethu
2023–2026	Gokulam Kerala		
2026–	Sethu		

International career^{‡}
2019	India U17		
2021–2023	India U20		
2021–	India	3	(0)
- * Club domestic league appearances and goals ‡ National team caps and goals as of 30 May 2025

Sumati Kumari (born 15 January 2004) is an Indian professional footballer from Jharkhand, who plays as a forward for Sethu in the Indian Women's League and represents the India women's national football team.

== Early life ==
Kumari is from Lundru village, Gumla district, Jharkhand. She is the youngest of six siblings. She trained at the local District Residential Sports Centre under coaches Veena Kerketta and Mohammad Rizwan. In 2019, when she was attending the National camp in Goa, her mother died. The news reached her after two days and she had decided to stay back and play for India. From May 2020, she has been supported by the Jharkhand government.

== Career ==
She was scouted by AIFF coaches while playing in her village and was selected for the Junior National camp in 2016.

In April 2019, she played for Jharkhand in the Junior Nationals and scored two goals in the 3–0 win in the semifinals against Gujarat. The event was also played as trials for selecting the Indian under-17 team for the 2020 U-17 World Cup.

She made her junior debut in 2019 and was part of the winning Indian U-15 Women's Team at the SAFF U-15 Championship in Bhutan, where she scored three goals in four matches.

In December 2019, she played the India under-17 team in the two friendlies against Thailand and Sweden. In January 2022, she made her senior India debut after she was selected for the Indian team to play AFC Asian Cup.

In March 2023, she was part of the Indian team in the AFC U-20 Women's Asian Cup Qualifiers Round 1 in Vietnam.

In August 2022, the Gumla district administration felicitated Sumati and other players on the National Sports Day.

== Career statistics ==
=== International ===
As of 30 May 2025

National team	Year	Caps	Goals
India	2021	2	0
India	2022	0	0
India	2023	0	0
India	2024	0	0
India	2025	1	0
Total		3	0
