= 2022 SAFF U-15 Women's Championship =

Tournament details
- Host country: Bangladesh
- Dates: 1–11 November
- Teams: 3 (from 1 sub-confederation)
- Venue: 1 (in 1 host city)

Final positions
- Champions: Nepal (1st title)
- Runners-up: Bangladesh

Tournament statistics
- Matches played: 6
- Goals scored: 28 (4.67 per match)
- Attendance: 11,784 (1,964 per match)
- Top scorer(s): (9 goals) (Bangladesh) Sauravi Akanda Prity
- Best player: (Bangladesh) Sauravi Akanda Prity
- Best goalkeeper: (Nepal) Sujata Tamang
- Fair play award: Bangladesh

The 2022 SAFF U-15 Women's Championship was the 4th edition of SAFF U-15 Women's Championship, the association football tournament for women's national team under the age of 15 and it organised by South Asian Football Federation. It was held from 1–11 November 2022 in Bangladesh.

Nepal is the defending champion having won the 2022 title for the finished top of the league table.

== Host selection ==
South Asian Football Federation (SAFF) have announced on 5 October 2022 that Bangladesh is the host of the tournament.

== Venue ==
All matches were played at the BSSS Mostafa Kamal Stadium in Dhaka, Bangladesh.

Dhaka	Dhaka is located in Bangladesh
BSSS Mostafa Kamal Stadium	Dhaka is located in Bangladesh
Capacity: 25,000	Dhaka is located in Bangladesh

== Player eligibility ==
All players born on or after 1 January 2007 are eligible to participate in the tournament.

== Match officials ==
Referees

- (Bangladesh) Jaya Chakma
- (India) Kanika Barman
- (India) Usha Bhainsora

Assistant Referees

- (India) Reshme Thapa Chettri
- (Bangladesh) Salma Akter Moni
- (India) Soni Akanksha

== Participating nations ==
The following three teams will participate in this edition.

Team	Appearances in the SAFF U-15 Women's Championship	Previous best performance
Bangladesh (Host)	4th	Champions (2017)
Bhutan	4th	3rd Place (2017, 2018)
Nepal	4th	3rd Place (2019)

== Tournament format ==
Double round-robin, each team will play each other twice. Champion will determine with team have a best result.

Key to colours in league table define Champion
Champion

== League table ==
=== Standing ===
Pos	Team	Pld	W	D	L	GF	GA	GD	Pts	Status
1	Nepal	4	3	1	0	10	1	+9	10	Champion
2	Bangladesh (H)	4	2	1	1	18	2	+16	7	
3	Bhutan	4	0	0	4	0	25	−25	0	

Source: SAFF
(H) Hosts

=== Matches ===
All times at local (UTC+6)

1 November 2022
16:30

Bhutan	0–8	Bangladesh
	Report (SAFF); Report (FBD)	Umehla 7', 76'; Thuinuye Marma 21'; Mst. Joynob Bibi Rita 28'; Kanon Rani Bahadur 50'; Prity 68', 73', 90+2'

BSSS Mostafa Kamal Stadium, Dhaka
Attendance: 1,117
Referee: Kanika Barman (India)

3 November 2022
16:30

Nepal	7–0	Bhutan
Barsha Oli 1', 17', 33', 34'; Sukriya Miya 65', 72'; Senu Pariyar 85'	Report (SAFF); Report (FBD)

BSSS Mostafa Kamal Stadium, Dhaka
Attendance: 150
Referee: Jaya Chakma (Bangladesh)

5 November 2022
16:30

Bangladesh	0–1	Nepal
	Report (SAFF); Report (FBD)	Barsha Oli 87'

BSSS Mostafa Kamal Stadium, Dhaka
Attendance: 3,708
Referee: Usha Bhainsora (India)

7 November 2022
16:30

Bangladesh	9–0	Bhutan
Prity 15', 22', 32', 45+1', 46', 87'; Nusrat Jahan Mitu 55'; Aysha Akter 66'; Thuinuye Marma 80'	Report (SAFF); Report (Offside Desk)

BSSS Mostafa Kamal Stadium, Dhaka
Attendance: 2,187
Referee: Usha Bhainsora (India)

9 November 2022
16:30

Bhutan	0–1	Nepal
	Report (SAFF); Report (FBD)	Senu Pariyar 49'

BSSS Mostafa Kamal Stadium, Dhaka
Attendance: 1,287
Referee: Jaya Chakma (Bangladesh)

11 November 2022
16:30

Nepal	1–1	Bangladesh
Sushila KC 15'	Report (SAFF); Report (Dhaka Post)	Mst. Ruma Akter 54'

BSSS Mostafa Kamal Stadium, Dhaka
Attendance: 3,335
Referee: Kanika Barman (India)

== Awards ==
2022 SAFF U-15 Women's Championship champions

Nepal
First title

== Statistics ==
=== Goalscorers ===
There have been 28 goals scored in 6 matches, for an average of 4.67 goals per match.

9 goals

- (Bangladesh) Sauravi Akanda Prity

5 goals

- (Nepal) Barsha Oli

2 goals

- (Bangladesh) Thuinuye Marma
- (Bangladesh) Umehla Marma
- (Nepal) Sushila KC
- (Nepal) Sukriya Miya
- (Nepal) Senu Pariyar

1 goal

- (Bangladesh) Kanon Rani Bahadur
- (Bangladesh) Mst Joynob Bibi Rita
- (Bangladesh) Mst Ruma Akter
- (Bangladesh) Nusrat Jahan Mitu
- (Bangladesh) Aysha Akter

Source: SAFF

== See also ==
- 2022 SAFF Women's Championship
- 2022 SAFF U-18 Women's Championship
- 2022 SAFF U-20 Championship
- 2022 SAFF U-17 Championship
