= 2026 SAFF U-17 Women's Championship =

Tournament details
- Host country: Bhutan
- City: Thimphu
- Teams: 7 (from 1 sub-confederation)
- Venue: 1

The 2026 SAFF U-17 Women's Championship was intended to be the 8th edition of SAFF U-17 Women's Championship an international football competition for women's under-17 national teams, organized by South Asian Football Federation. The tournament was scheduled to be held in Bhutan from 8–15 May 2026, but was ultimately cancelled due to financial constraints.

== See also ==
- 2026 SAFF U-17 Championship
- 2026 SAFF Championship
- 2026 SAFF Futsal Championship
- 2026 SAFF Club Championship
- 2026 SAFF U-19 Women's Championship
- 2026 SAFF Women's Championship
- 2026 SAFF Women's Futsal Championship
