= Kritina Devi Thounaojam =

Indian footballer

Kritina Devi
Personal information
- Full name: Kritina Devi Thounaojam
- Date of birth: 10 February 2003 (age 23)
- Place of birth: Haokha Mamang, Thoubal, Manipur, India
- Position: Defender

Team information
- Current team: Nita

Youth career
- Indian Arrows

Senior career*
Years	Team	Apps	(Gls)
- The Young Welfare Club
2021–22	Indian Arrows Women		
2022–2026	Gokulam Kerala	43	(0)
2026–	Nita		

International career^{‡}
- India U17
- * Club domestic league appearances and goals as of 15 May 2026 ‡ National team caps and goals as of 9 February 2024

Kritina Devi Thounaojam (Meitei: Thounaojam Kritina Devi, born 10 February 2003) is an Indian professional footballer from Manipur, who plays as a defender for the Indian Women's League club Nita. She has also represented India at the youth level.

== Early life ==
Kritina hails from Haokha Mamang village in Thoubal district, Manipur. Her father, Thounaojam Rajen Singh, is a farmer while her mother is a home maker. Initially, her father was reluctant to send his only daughter to play football but Devi's uncle Deben Singh persuaded him that it would be good for the girl. Deben Singh's son, Kiyam Amarjit Singh (former Under-17 India captain) and another cousin Thounaojam Jeakson Singh, both played for India team in the Under-17 World Cup. All three families stay close by in the same colony.

== Career ==
- While Kritina was in Class 6, she took part in a grassroots talent hunt in 2014 and she got hooked to the game.
- In 2019 she played a key role in the three-nation tournament with Thailand and Sweden.
- In July 2020, she was named in the probables for the Under-17 World Cup.
- In February 2021, she was one of the six players from Manipur selected for the Indian team for the international friendly matches in Alanya, Turkey.
- In November 2021, she was called for the U-19 National camp in preparation for the SAFF Women's Championship 2021 to be held in Bangladesh.

== Honours ==
Manipur

- Rajmata Jijabai Trophy: 2023–24
