= Akhi Khatun =

Bangladeshi footballer (born 2003)

Personal information
- Full name: Akhi Khatun
- Date of birth: 18 June 2003 (age 23)
- Place of birth: Shahzadpur, Sirajganj
- Height: 1.73 m (5 ft 8 in)
- Position: Centre-back

Youth career
- 2014: Parkola Government Primary School
- 2014: Shahzadpur Ibrahim Girls' School
- 2014–2022: BKSP

Senior career*
Years	Team	Apps	(Gls)
2020–2022	Bashundhara Kings	22	(4)

International career^{‡}
2016–2018	Bangladesh U14		(3)
2017–2020	Bangladesh U17		(2)
2018–2021	Bangladesh U20	9	(1)
2018–2022	Bangladesh	18	(3)
2018	Bangladesh futsal	3	(0)
Medal record
Women's football
Representing Bangladesh
SAFF Women's Championship
Winner	2022 Nepal
SAFF U-20 Women's Championship
Winner	2018 Bhutan
Winner	2021 Bangladesh
Bangamata U-19 Women's International Gold Cup
Winner	2019 Bangladesh
- * Club domestic league appearances and goals as of 9 December 2020 ‡ National team caps and goals as of 19 September 2022

Akhi Khatun (Bengali: আঁখি খাতুন, Bengali pronunciation: [ãkʰi kʰatun]) is a Bangladeshi former professional footballer who played as a centre-back for Bashundhara Kings Women and the Bangladesh women's national football team.

She rose through the ranks after playing for the national under-15 football team. Besides football, she has played for the Bangladesh futsal team.

== Career ==
Akhi was the member of 2017 SAFF U-15 Women's Championship winning Bangladesh squad. She scored two goals for a 3–0 win against Bhutan and showed doughty performance throughout the tournament on artificial turf was adjudged most valuable player of the tournament.

== International goals ==
No.	Date	Venue	Opponent	Score	Result	Competition
1.	13 November 2018	Thuwunna Stadium, Yangon, Myanmar	Nepal	1–1	1–1	2020 AFC Women's Olympic Qualifying Tournament

== Honors ==
Bangladesh U-20

- SAFF Women's Championship: 2021

Bangladesh

- SAFF Women's Championship: 2022
