= Bangladesh women's national under-17 football team =

Women's association football team

Bangladesh Women's U-17
- Association: Bangladesh Football Federation
- Confederation: AFC (Asia)
- Sub-confederation: SAFF (South Asia)
- Head coach: (Bangladesh) Mahbubur Rahman Litu
- Captain: Arpita Biswas
- Home stadium: Bangabandhu National Stadium
- FIFA code: BAN
First colours	Second colours

First international
- Bangladesh 0–1 Guam (Namhae, South Korea; 16 April 2005)

Biggest win
- Bangladesh 14–0 Pakistan (Thimphu, Bhutan; 9 August 2018)

Biggest defeat
- Japan 24–0 Bangladesh (Namhae, South Korea; 18 April 2005)

AFC U-17 Women's Asian Cup
- Appearances: 3 (first in 2005)
- Best result: Group stage (2005, 2017, 2019)

SAFF U-17 Women's Championship
- Appearances: 7 (first in 2017)
- Best result: Champions (2017, 2024)
Medal record
SAFF U-17 Women's Championship
Gold medal – first place	2017 Bangladesh
Silver medal – second place	2018 Bhutan
Silver medal – second place	2019 Bhutan
Silver medal – second place	2022 Bangladesh
Silver medal – second place	2023 Bangladesh
Gold medal – first place	2024 Nepal
Silver medal – second place	2025 Bhutan

The Bangladesh women's national under-17 football team represents Bangladesh in international women's under-17 football in the AFC U-17 Women's Asian Cup and the FIFA U-17 Women's World Cup. It is controlled by the Bangladesh Football Federation. They have qualified for the 2017 AFC U-16 Women's Championship in Thailand in September 2017. That was the first time this team played in the final round of the tournament after 2005 edition.

== Team image ==
=== Home stadium ===
The Bangladesh women's national under-17 football team plays its home matches on the Bangabandhu National Stadium.

== Results and fixtures ==
Legend

Win Draw Loss Fixture

=== 2026 ===
10 September 2026 Friendly	Bangladesh	5–0	Jordan	JFA Field, Jordan
20:00 UTC+6	Alpi 10'; Reya 51'; Mousumi 58'; Kulsum 80'; Payal 90'	Report

13 September 2026 Friendly	Bangladesh	2–0	Jordan	JFA Field, Jordan
20:00 UTC+6	Alpi; Alpi	Report

8 October 2026 AFC U-17 Women's Asian Cup Qualification	Bangladesh	2–1	Uzbekistan	Tashkent, Uzbekistan
17:00 BST (UTC+6)	Purnima 4'; Runa 90+3'	Report	Lakaeva 17'	Stadium: Do'stlik Stadium; Referee: Elaheh Sinakaei (Iran)

11 October 2026 AFC U-17 Women's Asian Cup Qualification	Philippines	3–0	Bangladesh	Tashkent, Uzbekistan
17:00 BST (UTC+6)	Bascara 73'; Granger 90', 90+2'	Report		Stadium: Do'stlik Stadium; Referee: Nodira Mirzoeva (Tajikistan)

== Coaching staff ==
=== Current coaching staff ===
As of 8 August 2025

Role	Name
Head coach	(Bangladesh) Mahbubur Rahman Litu
Assistant coach	(Bangladesh) Abul Hossain (Bangladesh) Mahmuda Akter
Goalkeepin coach	(Bangladesh) Md Emran Hasan Emon
Physiologist	(Bangladesh) Laizu Yeasmin Lipa
Team manager	(Bangladesh) Mahmuda Akter
Media officer	(Bangladesh) Khalid Mahmud
Technical Director	(Bangladesh) Saiful Bari Titu

=== Manager history ===
- (Bangladesh) Golam Robbani Choton (2013–2023)
- (Bangladesh) Saiful Bari Titu (2023–2024)
- (Bangladesh) Mahbubur Rahman Litu (2024–present)

== Players ==
- Krishna Rani Sarkar (2014–2017)

== Honours ==
- SAFF U-17 Women's Championship

Champion (2): 2017, 2024
Runners-up (4) 2018, 2019, 2022, 2023

- AFC U-14 Girls’ Regional (South and Central) Championship

Champion (2): 2015, 2016

- Jockey CGI U-15 Youth Tournament

Champion (1): 2018

== Competitive record ==
=== FIFA U-17 Women's World Cup ===
FIFA U-17 Women's World Cup records
Year	Result	Pld	W	D	L	GF	GA	GD
(New Zealand) 2008	Did not qualify							
(Trinidad and Tobago) 2010	Did not qualify							
(Azerbaijan) 2012	Did not qualify							
(Costa Rica) 2014	Did not qualify							
(Jordan) 2016	Did not qualify							
(Uruguay) 2018	Did not qualify							
(India) 2022	Did not qualify							
(Dominican Republic) 2024	Did not qualify							
(Morocco) 2025	Did not qualify							
Total	0/9	0	0	0	0	0	0	0

*Draws include knockout matches decided on penalty kicks.

=== AFC U-17 Women's Asian Cup ===
AFC U-17 Women's Championship records
Year	Result	Pld	W	D	L	GF	GA	GD
(South Korea) 2005	Group stage	3	0	0	3	2	28	-26
(Malaysia) 2007	Did not enter							
(Thailand) 2009	Did not enter							
(China) 2011	Did not enter							
(China) 2013	Did not enter							
(China) 2015	Did not qualify							
(Thailand) 2017	Group stage	3	0	0	3	2	15	-13
(Thailand) 2019	Group stage	3	0	1	2	2	12	-10
(Indonesia) ~~2022~~	Did not held							
(Indonesia) 2024	Did not qualify							
(China) 2026	Did not qualify							
(China) 2027	To be determined							
(China) 2028	To be determined							
Total	3/10	9	0	1	8	6	55	-49

*Draws include knockout matches decided on penalty kicks.

=== AFC U-17 Women's Asian Cup qualification ===
AFC U-17 Women's Championship qualification record
Hosts	Result	GP	W	D	L	GS	GA	GD
(South Korea) 2005	Direct Qualified							
(Malaysia) 2007	Did not participate							
(Thailand) 2009	Did not participate							
(China) 2011	Did not participate							
(China) 2013	Did not participate							
(China) 2015	Did not qualify	4	2	0	2	9	4	+5
(Thailand) 2017	Qualified	5	5	0	0	26	2	+24
(Thailand) 2019	Qualified	7	6	0	1	38	3	+35
(Indonesia) ~~2022~~	Not held							
(Indonesia) 2024	Did not qualify	5	2	0	3	10	9	+1
(China) 2026	Did not qualify	2	0	1	1	1	6	–5
(China) 2027	TBD							
(China) 2028	TBD							
Total	6/12	23	15	1	7	84	24	+60

=== SAFF U-17 Women's Championship ===
SAFF U-17 Women's Championship record
Hosts / Year	Result	GP	W	D*	L	GS	GA	GD
(Bangladesh) 2017	Champion	4	4	0	0	13	0	13
(Bhutan) 2018	Runners-up	4	3	0	1	22	1	21
(Bhutan) 2019	Runners-up	4	2	2	0	5	2	3
(Bangladesh) 2022	Runners-up	4	2	1	1	18	2	16
(Bangladesh) 2023	Runners-up	4	2	1	1	10	5	5
(Nepal) 2024	Champion	4	3	1	0	12	2	10
(Bhutan) 2025	Runners-up	6	4	1	1	15	8	7
Total	7/7	30	20	6	4	95	20	75

== Head-to-head record ==
As of 16 July 2026

Against	Region	P	W	D	L	GF	GA	GD	%Win
Australia	AFC	3	0	1	2	4	9	−5	0.00
Bahrain	AFC	1	1	0	0	10	0	+10	100.00
Bhutan	AFC	9	8	1	0	45	3	+42	88.89
China	AFC	1	0	0	1	0	3	−3	0.00
Chinese Taipei	AFC	2	1	0	1	4	7	−3	50.00
Guam	AFC	1	0	0	1	0	1	−1	0.00
Hong Kong	AFC	1	0	0	1	2	3	−1	0.00
India	AFC	11	5	3	3	15	11	+4	45.45
Iran	AFC	2	1	0	1	4	2	+2	50.00
Japan	AFC	3	0	0	3	0	36	−36	0.00
Jordan	AFC	2	1	1	0	2	1	+1	50.00
Kyrgyzstan	AFC	1	1	0	0	10	0	+10	100.00
Lebanon	AFC	1	1	0	0	8	0	+8	100.00
Myanmar	AFC	1	1	0	0	1	0	+1	100.00
Nepal	AFC	9	6	2	1	22	5	+17	66.67
North Korea	AFC	1	0	0	1	0	9	−9	0.00
Pakistan	AFC	1	1	0	0	14	0	+14	100.00
Philippines	AFC	2	1	0	1	11	3	+8	50.00
Russia	UEFA	1	0	0	1	0	3	−3	0.00
Singapore	AFC	2	2	0	0	8	0	+8	100.00
Syria	AFC	1	1	0	0	2	0	+2	100.00
Thailand	AFC	1	0	0	1	0	1	−1	0.00
Turkmenistan	AFC	1	1	0	0	6	0	+6	100.00
United Arab Emirates	AFC	4	4	0	0	20	0	+20	100.00
Uzbekistan	AFC	0	0	0	0	0	0	+0	—
Vietnam	AFC	2	1	0	1	2	2	+0	50.00
Total	26 nations	64	37	8	19	190	99	+91	57.81

== See also ==
- Sport in Bangladesh
  - Football in Bangladesh
    - Women's football in Bangladesh
- Bangladesh women's national football team
- Bangladesh women's national under-20 football team
