= 2018 SAFF U-15 Women's Championship =

Tournament details
- Host country: Bhutan
- Dates: 9–18 August
- Teams: 6 (from 1 confederation)
- Venue: 1 (in 1 host city)

Final positions
- Champions: India (1st title)
- Runners-up: Bangladesh
- Third place: Bhutan
- Fourth place: Nepal

Tournament statistics
- Matches played: 10
- Goals scored: 53 (5.3 per match)
- Attendance: 49,626 (4,963 per match)
- Top scorer(s): (India) Shilky Devi (Bangladesh) Shamsunnahar (Bangladesh) Tohura Khatun (Nepal) Chandra Bhandari (4 goals)
- Best player: (India) Naorem Priyanka Devi
- Fair play award: Bangladesh

The 2018 SAFF U-15 Women's Championship was the 2nd edition of the SAFF U-15 Women's Championship, an international football competition for women's under-15 national teams organized by SAFF. The tournament was hosted by Bhutan from 9–18 of August, 2018 at Changlimithang Stadium. Six teams from the region took part.

== Host selection ==
A draw for tournament ceremony was held on 7 July 2018 in Motijheel at conference room of Bangladesh Football Federation.

SAFF general secretary Anwarul Haque Helal and BFF general secretary Abu Nayeem Shohag, were among others present on the occasion.

== Player eligibility ==
Players born on or after 1 January 2003 are eligible to compete in the tournament.

== Participating nations ==
Team	Appearances in the SAFF U-15 Women's Championship	Previous best performance
Bangladesh	2nd	Champions (2017)
Bhutan (Host)	2nd	Group Stage (2017)
India	2nd	Runners-up (2017)
Nepal	2nd	Group Stage (2017)
Pakistan	1st	—
Sri Lanka	1st	—

== Venue ==
Thimphu
Changlimithang Stadium	Changlimithang (Bhutan)
Capacity: 30,000	Changlimithang (Bhutan)

== Group stage ==
- All matches were played in Thimphu, Bhutan.
- Times listed are UTC+06:00.

Key to colours in group tables
Group winners and runners-up advance to the semi-finals

=== Group A ===
Pos	Team	Pld	W	D	L	GF	GA	GD	Pts	Status
1	India	2	2	0	0	13	0	+13	6	Qualified for Knockout stage
2	Bhutan (H)	2	1	0	1	6	1	+5	3	Qualified for Knockout stage
3	Sri Lanka	2	0	0	2	0	18	−18	0	

Source: Bhutan Football
(H) Hosts
9 August 2018
16:00

India	12–0	Sri Lanka
Hemam Shilky Devi 1', 20', 44'; Lynda Kom 6'; Aveka Singh 14', 59'; Sunita Munda 42', 79'; Thounaojam Kritina Devi 47'; Kiran 72'; Anju 87', 89'	AIFF

Changlimithang Stadium, Thimphu
Attendance: 4,619
Referee: Ali Islam (Bangladesh)

11 August 2018
16:00

Bhutan	6–0	Sri Lanka
Sonam Lamho 9', 38', 79'; Yeshey Bidha 67', 83'; Deki Yangdon 77'

Changlimithang Stadium, Thimphu
Attendance: 7,631
Referee: Jeet Chowdhury (India)

13 August 2018
16:00

India	1–0	Bhutan
Hemam Shilky Devi 58'	AIFF

Changlimithang Stadium, Thimphu
Attendance: 4,762
Referee: Mizanur Rahman (Bangladesh)

=== Group B ===
Pos	Team	Pld	W	D	L	GF	GA	GD	Pts	Status
1	Bangladesh	2	2	0	0	17	0	+17	6	Qualified for Knockout stage
2	Nepal	2	1	0	1	4	3	+1	3	Qualified for Knockout stage
3	Pakistan	2	0	0	2	0	18	−18	0	

Source: Bhutan Football
9 August 2018
19:00 BST

Bangladesh	14–0	Pakistan
Tohura Khatun 5', 19'; Monika Chakma 17'; Shamsunnahar 31'; Maria Manda 39'; Akhi Khatun 40'; Sajeda Khatun 48', 58'; Shamsunnahai 50', 54', 57', 90'; Anai Mogini 60', 88'

Changlimithang Stadium, Thimphu
Attendance: 6,401
Referee: Diponkar Ghosh (India)

11 August 2018
19:00 BST

Nepal	4–0	Pakistan
Anuska Sherpa 8'; Sabita Rana Magar 14', 56'; Rajani Thokar 59'

Changlimithang Stadium, Thimphu
Attendance: 1,964
Referee: Ali Islam (Bangladesh)

13 August 2018
19:00 BST

Nepal	0–3	Bangladesh
		Tohura Khatun 46'; Maria Manda 51'; Sajeda Khatun 67'

Changlimithang Stadium, Thimphu
Attendance: 4,916
Referee: P.Singh (India)

== Bracket ==
Semi-finals
16 August – Thimphu
India	2
Nepal	1
16 August – Thimphu
Bangladesh	5
Bhutan	0

Final
18 August – Thimphu
India	1
Bangladesh	0
Third Place
18 August – Thimphu
Nepal	2 (3)
Bhutan (p)	2 (4)

== Knockout stage ==
=== Semi-finals ===
16 August 2018
16:00 BST

India	2–1	Nepal
Lynda Kom 31'; Thounaojam Kritina Devi 59'	AIFF	Rajani Thokar 37'

Changlimithang Stadium, Thimphu
Attendance: 1,946
Referee: Mizanur Rahman (Bangladesh)

16 August 2018
19:00 BST

Bangladesh	5–0	Bhutan
Anai Mogini 18'; Anuching Mogini 38'; Tohura Khatun 43'; Maria Manda 69'; Shaheda Akter Ripa 86'

Changlimithang Stadium, Thimphu
Attendance: 4,803
Referee: P.Singh (India)

=== Third place match ===
18 August 2018
16:00 BST

Nepal	2–2	Bhutan
Chandra Bhandhari 48', 55'		Deki Yangdon 3'; Yeshi Bidha 66'
Penalties
Sabita Rana Magar (penalty missed); Saraswati Hamal (penalty scored); Preeti Rai (penalty scored); Saloni Ramanagar (penalty scored); Chandra Bhandari (penalty missed)	3–4	(penalty scored) Sonam Lamho; (penalty scored) Tshering Yangchen; (penalty missed) Sherab Pelmo; (penalty scored) Yeshi Bidha; (penalty scored) Tshering Lhadon

Changlimithang Stadium, Thimphu
Attendance: 1,973
Referee: Ali Islam (Bangladesh)

=== Final ===
18 August 2018
19:00 BST

India	1–0	Bangladesh
Sunita Munda 66'	AIFF

Changlimithang Stadium, Thimphu
Attendance: 10,611
Referee: Shubash Thapa (Nepal)

== Awards ==
2018 SAFF U-15 Women's Championship champions

India
First title

== Goalscorers ==
4 Goals

- (Bangladesh) Shamsunnahai
- (Bangladesh) Tohura Khatun
- (India) Shilky Devi
- (Nepal) Chandra Bhandhari

3 Goals

- (Bangladesh) Sajeda Khatun
- (Bangladesh) Maria Manda
- (Bhutan) Sonam Lamho
- (Bhutan) Yeshey Bidha
- (India) Sunita Munda

2 Goals

- (Bangladesh) Anai Mogini
- (Bhutan) Deki Yangdon
- (India) Aveka Singh
- (India) Anju
- (India) Lynda Kom
- (India) Thounaojam Kritina Devi
- (Nepal) Sabita Rana Magar
- (Nepal) Rajani Thokar

1 Goal

- (Bangladesh) Monika Chakma
- (Bangladesh) Shamsunnahar
- (Bangladesh) Akhi Khatun
- (Bangladesh) Anuching Mogini
- (Bangladesh) Shaheda Akter Ripa
- (India) Kiran
- (Nepal) Anuska Sherpa
