= 2022 AFC U-17 Women's Asian Cup =

Piala Asia Putri U-17 2022

Tournament details
- Host country: Indonesia
- Dates: Cancelled (originally 9–22 May 2022)
- Teams: 8 (from 1 confederation)

The 2022 AFC U-17 Women's Asian Cup was originally to be held as the 9th edition of the AFC U-17 Women's Asian Cup (including previous editions of the AFC U-17 Women's Championship and AFC U-16 Women's Championship), the biennial international youth football championship organised by the Asian Football Confederation (AFC) for the women's under-17 national teams of Asia, before being cancelled due to the COVID-19 pandemic.

Starting from the 2022 edition, the AFC agreed to the proposal for switching the tournament from under-16 to under-17. Moreover, the tournament was also rebranded from the "AFC U-16 Women's Championship" to the "AFC U-17 Women's Asian Cup". It was scheduled to be held in Indonesia between 9–22 May 2022. A total of eight teams were to compete in the tournament.

The AFC announced the cancellation of the tournament on 5 July 2021, leaving the hosting rights for the 2024 AFC U-17 Women's Asian Cup also to Indonesia. Japan were to be the defending champions.

In addition to India (as hosts), the top two teams of the tournament were to qualify for the 2021 FIFA U-17 Women's World Cup in India, prior to that tournament's own cancellation. These same three teams - India (as hosts), Japan and North Korea - qualified for the 2022 FIFA U-17 Women's World Cup. However, the AFC subsequently announced that China PR would replace North Korea as one of the AFC's representatives.

== Qualification ==
The host country and the top three teams of the previous tournament in 2019 qualified automatically, while the other four teams were to be decided by qualification. There would have been two rounds of qualification matches, with the first round scheduled to be played between 18 and 26 September 2021, and the second round scheduled to be played between 8–12 December 2021.

=== Qualified teams ===
The following teams qualified for the tournament.

Team	Qualified as	Appearance	Previous best performance
Indonesia	Hosts	2nd	Group stage (2005)
Japan	2019 champions	9th	Champions (2005, 2011, 2013, 2019)
North Korea	2019 runners-up	8th	Champions (2007, 2015, 2017)
China	2019 third place	9th	Runners-up (2005)

== Qualified teams for FIFA U-17 Women's World Cup ==
Japan and North Korea, the winners and runners-up of 2019 edition, originally qualified for the 2022 FIFA U-17 Women's World Cup, including India who qualified automatically as host.

On 16 March 2022, the AFC announced that China PR would replace North Korea as one of the AFC's representatives.

On 16 August 2022, it was announced that the All India Football Federation, or AIFF, was suspended by FIFA due to undue influence from third parties. As a result, the 2022 FIFA U-17 Women's World Cup was stripped from India, as FIFA planned to assess the next steps when it came to hosting the tournament. On 27 August, FIFA lifted the suspension, thus giving back the hosting rights to India.

Team	Qualified on	Previous appearances in FIFA U-17 Women's World Cup^{1}
India	15 March 2019	0 (debut)
Japan	25 September 2019	6 (2008, 2010, 2012, **2014**, 2016, 2018)
China	16 March 2022	2 (2012, 2014)

^{1} Bold indicates champions for that year. Italic indicates hosts for that year.
