= 2019 AFC U-16 Women's Championship =

ฟุตบอลหญิงชิงชนะเลิศแห่งเอเชีย รุ่นอายุไม่เกิน 16 ปี 2019

Tournament details
- Host country: Thailand
- Dates: 15–28 September
- Teams: 8 (from 1 confederation)
- Venues: 2 (in 1 host city)

Final positions
- Champions: Japan (4th title)
- Runners-up: North Korea
- Third place: China
- Fourth place: Australia

Tournament statistics
- Matches played: 16
- Goals scored: 63 (3.94 per match)
- Attendance: 2,689 (168 per match)
- Top scorer: (Japan) Maika Hamano (5 goals)
- Best player: (Japan) Hanon Nishio
- Fair play award: North Korea

The 2019 AFC U-16 Women's Championship was the 8th edition of the AFC U-16 Women's Championship, the biennial international youth football championship organised by the Asian Football Confederation (AFC) for the women's under-16 national teams of Asia. The tournament was held in Thailand between 15 and 28 September 2019, with a total of eight teams competing.

The top two teams of the tournament would have qualified for the 2021 FIFA U-17 Women's World Cup (originally 2020 but postponed due to COVID-19 pandemic) in India as the AFC representatives, besides India who would have automatically qualified as hosts. However, FIFA announced on 17 November 2020 that this edition of the World Cup would be cancelled.

This edition was the last to be played as an under-16 tournament, as the AFC have agreed to the proposal for switching the tournament from under-16 to under-17 starting from 2022.

North Korea were the defending champions, but were defeated 2–1 in the final by Japan.

== Qualification ==
Four teams qualified directly for the final tournament: the hosts and the top three of 2017. The other four spots were determined by the qualifying stage.

A total of 30 teams entered the qualifying stage. Due to the increased number of teams, two qualification rounds were scheduled for the first time. The first round was scheduled for 15–23 September 2018, and the second round was scheduled for 23 February – 3 March 2019.

=== Qualified teams ===
The following teams have qualified for the tournament.

Team	Qualified as	Appearance	Previous best performance
Thailand	Hosts	8th	Third place (2005)
North Korea	2017 champions	7th	Champions (2007, 2015, 2017)
South Korea	2017 runners-up	8th	Champions (2009)
Japan	2017 third place	8th	Champions (2005, 2011, 2013)
Australia	Second round Group A winners	6th	Fourth place (2009)
Vietnam	Second round Group A runners-up	1st	Debut
China	Second round Group B winners	8th	Runners-up (2005)
Bangladesh	Second round Group B runners-up	3rd	Group stage (2005, 2017)

== Venues ==
The matches are played at two venues, both at the Mueang Chonburi District in Chonburi Province.

- Chonburi Stadium
- IPE Chonburi Stadium

Chonburi
Chonburi Stadium	IPE Chonburi Stadium
Capacity: 8,680	Capacity: 11,000
2019 AFC U-16 Women's Championship is located in Thailand

== Draw ==
The draw was held on 23 May 2019, 15:30 ICT (UTC+7), at the Oakwood Hotel in Chonburi, Thailand. The eight teams were drawn into two groups of four teams. The teams were seeded according to their performance in the 2017 AFC U-16 Women's Championship final tournament and qualification, with the hosts Thailand automatically seeded and assigned to Position A1 in the draw.

Pot 1	Pot 2	Pot 3	Pot 4
1. Thailand (hosts); 2. North Korea	3. South Korea; 4. Japan	5. China; 6. Australia	7. Bangladesh; 8. Vietnam

== Squads ==
Players born between 1 January 2003 and 31 December 2005 were eligible to compete in the tournament. Each team must register a squad of minimum 16 players and maximum 23 players, minimum two of whom must be goalkeepers (Regulations Articles 24.1 and 24.2).

== Group stage ==
The top two teams of each group advanced to the semi-finals.

Tiebreakers

Teams were ranked according to points (3 points for a win, 1 point for a draw, 0 points for a loss), and if tied on points, the following tiebreaking criteria are applied, in the order given, to determine the rankings (Regulations Article 9.3):

1. Points in head-to-head matches among tied teams;
2. Goal difference in head-to-head matches among tied teams;
3. Goals scored in head-to-head matches among tied teams;
4. If more than two teams are tied, and after applying all head-to-head criteria above, a subset of teams are still tied, all head-to-head criteria above are reapplied exclusively to this subset of teams;
5. Goal difference in all group matches;
6. Goals scored in all group matches;
7. Penalty shoot-out if only two teams are tied and they meet in the last round of the group;
8. Disciplinary points (yellow card = 1 point, red card as a result of two yellow cards = 3 points, direct red card = 3 points, yellow card followed by direct red card = 4 points);
9. Drawing of lots.

All times are local, ICT (UTC+7).

Schedule
Matchday	Dates	Matches
Matchday 1	15–16 September 2019	1 v 4, 2 v 3
Matchday 2	18–19 September 2019	4 v 2, 3 v 1
Matchday 3	21–22 September 2019	1 v 2, 3 v 4

=== Group A ===
Pos	Team	Pld	W	D	L	GF	GA	GD	Pts	Qualification
1	Japan	3	2	1	0	17	0	+17	7	Knockout stage
2	Australia	3	1	2	0	8	3	+5	5	Knockout stage
3	Thailand (H)	3	1	0	2	2	14	−12	3	
4	Bangladesh	3	0	1	2	2	12	−10	1	

Source: AFC
Rules for classification: Group stage tiebreakers
(H) Hosts
15 September 2019
16:00

Japan	0–0	Australia
	Report

IPE Chonburi Stadium, Chonburi
Attendance: 223
Referee: Law Bik Chi (Hong Kong)
15 September 2019
19:00

Thailand	1–0	Bangladesh
Thawanrat 59'	Report

Chonburi Stadium, Chonburi
Attendance: 300
Referee: Kim Yu-jeong (South Korea)

18 September 2019
16:00

Bangladesh	0–9	Japan
	Report	Hayashi 2'; Hamano 6', 23'; Ota 17'; Nebu 43', 51'; Hiranaka 49'; Tanno 60', 61'

IPE Chonburi Stadium, Chonburi
Attendance: 165
Referee: Mahnaz Zokaee (Iran)
18 September 2019
19:00

Australia	6–1	Thailand
Jancevski 5', 45+1'; Lowry 27', 45+3'; Beaumont 51', 59'	Report	Janista 70'

Chonburi Stadium, Chonburi
Attendance: 250
Referee: Bùi Thị Thu Trang (Vietnam)

21 September 2019
16:00

Thailand	0–8	Japan
	Report	Hamano 28', 49'; Nishio 31', 33'; Tanno 50'; Oyama 61'; Inose 70'; Amano 86'

Chonburi Stadium, Chonburi
Attendance: 250
Referee: Kim Yu-jeong (South Korea)
21 September 2019
16:00

Australia	2–2	Bangladesh
Mihocic 77'; Zois 80'	Report	T. Khatun 21', 78'

IPE Chonburi Stadium, Chonburi
Attendance: 172
Referee: Mahsa Ghorbani (Iran)

=== Group B ===
Pos	Team	Pld	W	D	L	GF	GA	GD	Pts	Qualification
1	North Korea	3	3	0	0	17	0	+17	9	Knockout stage
2	China	3	2	0	1	3	4	−1	6	Knockout stage
3	South Korea	3	1	0	2	3	5	−2	3	
4	Vietnam	3	0	0	3	0	14	−14	0	

Source: AFC
Rules for classification: Group stage tiebreakers
16 September 2019
16:00

North Korea	10–0	Vietnam
Kim Chung-mi 8'; Sin Pom-hyang 44' (pen.), 90+2'; Myong Yu-jong 51', 85'; Kim Hye-yong 55'; Hong Song-ok 57'; Ham Ju-hyang 67'; Kim Kye-jong 71', 78'	Report

IPE Chonburi Stadium, Chonburi
Attendance: 105
Referee: Thein Thein Aye (Myanmar)
16 September 2019
19:00

South Korea	0–2	China
	Report	Zou Mengyao 66'; Shao Ziqin 75' (pen.)

Chonburi Stadium, Chonburi
Attendance: 80
Referee: Mahsa Ghorbani (Iran)

19 September 2019
16:00

China	0–4	North Korea
	Report	Kim Chung-mi 27'; Myong Yu-jong 36'; Sin Pom-hyang 60'; Hong Song-ok 83'

IPE Chonburi Stadium, Chonburi
Attendance: 119
Referee: Rebecca Durcau (Australia)
19 September 2019
19:00

Vietnam	0–3	South Korea
	Report	Hwang Ah-yun 17'; Jang Jin-yeong 20'; Vũ Thị Hoa 90+1' (o.g.)

Chonburi Stadium, Chonburi
Attendance: 100
Referee: Asmita Manandhar (Nepal)

22 September 2019
16:00

North Korea	3–0	South Korea
Myong Yu-jong 36'; Hong Song-ok 56'; Kim Hye-yong 68'	Report

Chonburi Stadium, Chonburi
Attendance: 80
Referee: Law Bik Chi (Hong Kong)
22 September 2019
16:00

China	1–0	Vietnam
Shao Ziqin 81'	Report

IPE Chonburi Stadium, Chonburi
Attendance: 83
Referee: Thein Thein Aye (Myanmar)

== Knockout stage ==
In the knockout stage, penalty shoot-out (no extra time) was used to decide the winner if necessary (Regulations Articles 12.1 and 12.2).

=== Bracket ===
Semi-finals
25 September – IPE Chonburi
Japan	2
China	0
25 September – IPE Chonburi
North Korea	3
Australia	0

Final
28 September – Chonburi
Japan	2
North Korea	1
Third place match
28 September – Chonburi
China	2
Australia	1

=== Semi-finals ===
Winners qualified for 2021 FIFA U-17 Women's World Cup.

25 September 2019
12:00

North Korea	3–0	Australia
Kim Hye-yong 14', 17'; Kim Pom-i 90+3'	Report

IPE Chonburi Stadium, Chonburi
Attendance: 150
Referee: Thein Thein Aye (Myanmar)

25 September 2019
16:00

Japan	2–0	China
Nishio 71'; Hamano 82'	Report

IPE Chonburi Stadium, Chonburi
Attendance: 152
Referee: Bùi Thị Thu Trang (Vietnam)

=== Third place match ===
28 September 2019
16:00

China	2–1	Australia
Shi Xiaomin 78'; Zou Mengyao 82'	Report	Lowry 1'

Chonburi Stadium, Chonburi
Attendance: 180
Referee: Kim Yu-jeong (South Korea)

=== Final ===
28 September 2019
20:00

Japan	2–1	North Korea
Amano 19'; Hayashi 23'	Report	Hong Song-ok 9' (pen.)

Chonburi Stadium, Chonburi
Attendance: 280
Referee: Law Bik Chi (Hong Kong)

== Winners ==
Winner 2019 AFC U-16 Women's Championship

Japan
Fourth title

== Awards ==
The following awards were given at the conclusion of the tournament:

Top Goalscorer	Most Valuable Player	Fair Play award
(Japan) Maika Hamano	(Japan) Hanon Nishio	North Korea

== Goalscorers ==
There were 63 goals scored in 16 matches, for an average of 3.94 goals per match.

5 goals

- (Japan) Maika Hamano

4 goals

- (North Korea) Hong Song-ok
- (North Korea) Kim Hye-yong
- (North Korea) Myong Yu-jong

3 goals

- (Australia) Hana Lowry
- (Japan) Hanon Nishio
- (Japan) Ririka Tanno
- (North Korea) Sin Pom-hyang

2 goals

- (Australia) Georgia Beaumont
- (Australia) Alana Jancevski
- (Bangladesh) Tohura Khatun
- (China) Shao Ziqin
- (China) Zou Mengyao
- (Japan) Suzu Amano
- (Japan) Manaka Hayashi
- (Japan) Momoko Nebu
- (North Korea) Kim Chung-mi
- (North Korea) Kim Kye-jong

1 goal

- (Australia) Claudia Mihocic
- (Australia) Paige Zois
- (China) Shi Xiaomin
- (Japan) Kyono Hiranaka
- (Japan) Yuko Inose
- (Japan) Moe Ota
- (Japan) Aemu Oyama
- (North Korea) Ham Ju-hyang
- (North Korea) Kim Pom-i
- (South Korea) Hwang Ah-yun
- (South Korea) Jang Jin-yeong
- (Thailand) Janista Jinantuya
- (Thailand) Thawanrat Promthongmee

1 own goal

- (Vietnam) Vũ Thị Hoa (against South Korea)

== Qualified teams for FIFA U-17 Women's World Cup ==
Japan, North Korea, and China would have qualified for the 2021 FIFA U-17 Women's World Cup before the tournament was cancelled.

Japan and North Korea originally qualified for the 2022 FIFA U-17 Women's World Cup, including India who qualified automatically as host. On 16 March 2022, the AFC announced that China PR would replace North Korea as the AFC's representatives at the FIFA U-17 Women's World Cup. On 16 August 2022, it was announced that the All India Football Federation, or AIFF, was suspended by FIFA due to undue influence from third parties. As a result, the 2022 FIFA U-17 Women's World Cup was stripped from India, as FIFA planned to assess the next steps when it came to hosting the tournament. On 27 August, FIFA lifted the suspension, thus giving back the hosting rights to India.

Team	Qualified on	Previous appearances in FIFA U-17 Women's World Cup^{1}
India	15 March 2019	0 (debut)
Japan	25 September 2019	6 (2008, 2010, 2012, **2014**, 2016, 2018)
China	16 March 2022	2 (2012, 2014)

^{1} Bold indicates champions for that year. Italic indicates hosts for that year.
