= 2019 SAFF U-15 Women's Championship =

Tournament details
- Host country: Bhutan
- Dates: 9–15 October
- Teams: 4 (from 1 confederation)
- Venue: Changlimithang Stadium (in Thimphu host cities)

Final positions
- Champions: India (2nd title)
- Runners-up: Bangladesh
- Third place: Nepal
- Fourth place: Bhutan

Tournament statistics
- Matches played: 7
- Goals scored: 25 (3.57 per match)
- Attendance: 4,150 (593 per match)
- Top scorer(s): (India) Lynda Kom Serto (4 goals)
- Best player: (Bangladesh) Rupna Chakma
- Fair play award: Bhutan

The 2019 SAFF U-15 Women's Championship was the 3rd edition of the SAFF U-15 Women's Championship, an international football competition for women's under-15 national teams organized by SAFF. The tournament was hosted by Thimphu, Bhutan from 9 October to 15 October 2019. Four teams from the region will take part.

== Squads ==
Players born on or after 1 January 2004 are eligible to compete in the tournament. Each team have to register a squad of minimum 18 players and maximum 23 players, minimum three of whom had to be goalkeepers.

== Participating nations ==
Team	Appearances in the SAFF U-15 Women's Championship	Previous best performance
Bangladesh	3rd	Champions (2017)
Bhutan (Host)	3rd	3rd (2018)
India	3rd	Champions (2018)
Nepal	3rd	4th (2018)

== Venue ==
Thimphu
Changlimithang Stadium
Capacity: 25,000
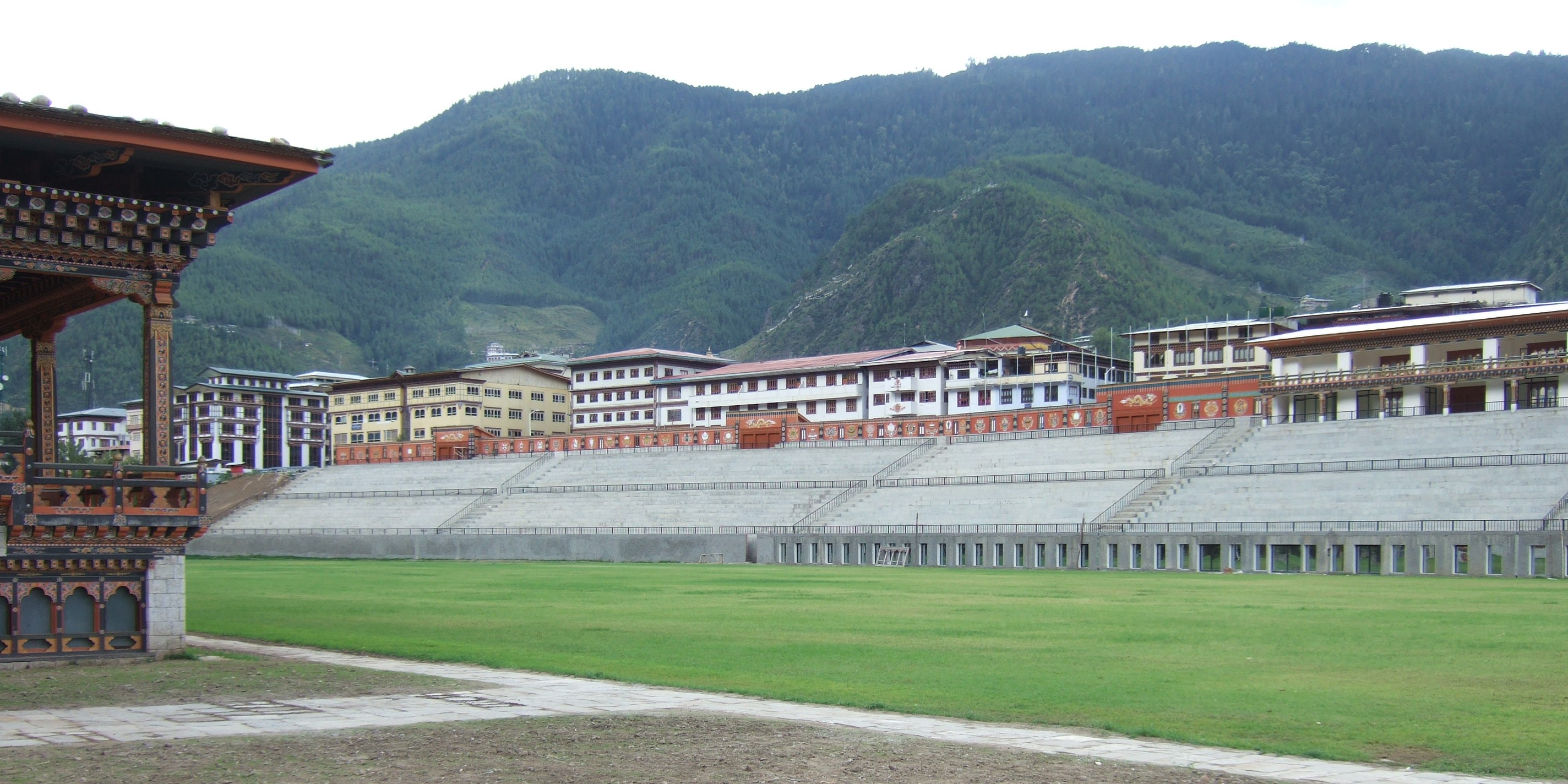

== Round robin ==
All the four teams will play each other in a round robin phase and the top two teams will play the final.

- All matches will be played at Thimphu, Bhutan.
- Times listed are UTC+06:00.

Key to colours in group tables
Advance to Final

Pos	Team	Pld	W	D	L	GF	GA	GD	Pts	Status
1	India	3	2	1	0	15	3	+12	7	Qualified for Final
2	Bangladesh	3	2	1	0	5	2	+3	7	Qualified for Final
3	Nepal	3	0	1	2	3	7	−4	1	
4	Bhutan (H)	3	0	1	2	2	13	−11	1	

Source: SAFF
Rules for classification: 1) points; 2) head-to-head points; 3) head-to-head goal difference; 4) goal difference; 5) number of goals scored;
(H) Hosts

9 October 2019
15:00

Nepal	1–4	India
Damai 62'	Report	Kumari 7'; Serto 38', 56'; Sujeesh 66'

Changlimithang Stadium, Thimphu
Attendance: 1,550
Referee: Jaya Chakma (Bangladesh)

9 October 2019
18:00

Bangladesh	2–0	Bhutan
Ripa 22'; Akhter 31'	Report

Changlimithang Stadium, Thimphu
Attendance: 750
Referee: Anjana Rai (Nepal)

11 October 2019
15:00

Nepal	1–2	Bangladesh
Karki 64'	Report	Ripa 12'; Shamsunnahar Jr. 26'

Changlimithang Stadium, Thimphu
Attendance: 450
Referee: Kanika Burman (India)

11 October 2019
18:00

Bhutan	1–10	India
Wangmo 9'	Report	Sujeesh 8'; Kiran 15', 21'; Serto 19', 54'; Kumari 24', 86'; Sankhae 63', 64', 72'

Changlimithang Stadium, Thimphu
Referee: Jaya Chakma (Bangladesh)

13 October 2019
15:00

Bangladesh	1–1	India
Rani 26'	Report	Baxla 24'

Changlimithang Stadium, Thimphu
Attendance: 400
Referee: Choki Om (Bhutan)

13 October 2019
18:00

Nepal	1–1	Bhutan
Damai 50'	Report	Lhazom 68'

Changlimithang Stadium, Thimphu
Attendance: 600
Referee: Kanika Burman (India)

== Final ==
15 October 2019
18:00 UTC+6

India	0–0	Bangladesh
	Report
Penalties
	5–3

Changlimithang Stadium, Thimphu
Attendance: 400
Referee: Choki Om (Bhutan)

== Awards ==
2019 SAFF U-15 Women's Championship Champions

India
Second title

== Goalscorers ==
There were 25 goals scored in 7 matches, for an average of 3.57 goals per match.

4 goals

- (India) Lynda Kom Serto

3 goals

- (India) Sumati Kumari
- (India) Sai Sankhae

2 goals

- (Bangladesh) Shaheda Akter Ripa
- (India) Kiran
- (India) Priyanka Sujeesh
- (Nepal) Man Maya Damai

1 goal

- (Bangladesh) Rojina Akhter
- (Bangladesh) Shamsunnahar Jr.
- (Bangladesh) Sapna Rani
- (Bhutan) Sangay Wangmo
- (Bhutan) Deki Lhazom
- (India) Amisha Baxla
- (Nepal) Amisha Karki

== Broadcasting rights ==
Country	Broadcaster
Nepal (host)	MYCUJOO.TV
South Asian Countries	MYCUJOO.TV
South-East Asian Countries	MYCUJOO.TV
