= 2017 SAFF U-15 Women's Championship =

Tournament details
- Host country: Bangladesh
- Dates: 17–24 December
- Teams: 4 (from 1 confederation)
- Venue: 2 (in 2 host cities)

Final positions
- Champions: Bangladesh (1st title)
- Runners-up: India
- Third place: Bhutan
- Fourth place: Nepal

Tournament statistics
- Matches played: 7
- Goals scored: 28 (4 per match)
- Attendance: 32,192 (4,599 per match)
- Top scorer: (India) Naorem Priyanka Devi (4 goals)
- Best player: (Bangladesh) Akhi Khatun
- Fair play award: Bangladesh

The 2017 SAFF U-15 Women's Championship was the 1st edition of the SAFF U-15 Women's Championship, an international football competition for women's under-15 national teams organized by SAFF. The tournament was hosted by Bangladesh from 17 to 24 December 2017 at Bangabandhu National Stadium and BSSSM Mostofa Kamal Stadium. Four teams from the region took part.

== Participating teams ==
Team	Appearances in the SAFF U-15 Women's Championship	Previous best performance
Bangladesh (Host)	1st	—
Bhutan	1st	—
India	1st	—
Nepal	1st	—

== Venues ==
Bangabandhu National Stadium	BSSSM Mostofa Kamal Stadium
Dhaka	Dhaka
Capacity: 36,000	Capacity: 25,000

== Group stage ==
- All matches were played in Dhaka, Bangladesh.
- Times listed are UTC+06:00.

Pos	Team	Pld	W	D	L	GF	GA	GD	Pts	Status
1	Bangladesh	3	3	0	0	12	0	+12	9	Qualified for Final
2	India	3	2	0	1	13	3	+10	6	Qualified for Final
3	Bhutan	3	0	1	2	1	7	−6	1	
4	Nepal	3	0	1	2	1	17	−16	1	

Source: [SAFF]
17 December 2017
10:30 BST

India	3–0	Bhutan
Thounaojam 4'; Naorem 11'; Pratiksha Lakra 19'	AIFF; BFF

BSSSM Mostofa Kamal Stadium
Attendance: 1,381
Referee: Haleem Mridha (Bangladesh)

17 December 2017
14:30 BST

Bangladesh	6–0	Nepal
Monika Chakma 11'; Anuching Mogini 14', 45+1'; Tohura Khatun 32', 59', 73'	GoalNepal; BFF

BSSSM Mostofa Kamal Stadium
Attendance: 1,3516
Referee: Arjun Majumdar (India)

19 December 2017
11:30 BST

Bhutan	0–3	Bangladesh
	BFF	Akhi Khatun 13', 56'; Sajeda Khatun 80'

BSSSM Mostofa Kamal Stadium
Attendance: 2,311
Referee: P.Singh (India)

19 December 2017
14:30 BST

Nepal	0–10	India
	AIFF	Lynda Kom Serto 4', 31'; Sunita Munda 23', 62', 86'; Santhiya 40'; Naorem Priyanka Devi 41', 52', 75'; Pusparani Chanu 69'

BSSSM Mostofa Kamal Stadium
Attendance: 4,687
Referee: Jamal Khan (Bangladesh)

21 December 2017
11:30 BST

India	0–3	Bangladesh
		Anuching Mogini 32'; Shamsunnahar 45+' (pen.); Monika Chakma 52'

BSSSM Mostafa Kamal Stadium
Attendance: 4,918
Referee: Hafeez Mir (Pakistan)

21 December 2017
14:30 BST

Nepal	1–1	Bhutan
Sabita Rana Magar 81'		Diki 9'

BSSSM Mostafa Kamal Stadium
Attendance: 4,139
Referee: Kamal Khan (Bangladesh)

== Final ==
24 December 2017
14:00 BST

India	0–1	Bangladesh
	Report	Shamsunnahar 41'

BSSSM Mostafa Kamal Stadium
Attendance: 1,240
Referee: Harish Karki (Nepal)

== Awards ==
2017 SAFF U-15 Women's Championship champions

Bangladesh
First title

== Goalscorers ==
4 goals

- (India) Naorem Priyanka Devi

3 goals

- (Bangladesh) Anuching Mogini
- (Bangladesh) Tohura Khatun
- (India) Sunita Munda

2 goals

- (Bangladesh) Akhi Khatun
- (Bangladesh) Monika Chakma
- (Bangladesh) Shamsunnahar
- (India) Kynda Kom Serto

1 goal

- (Bhutan) Diki
- (Nepal) Sabita Rana Magar
- (Bangladesh) Sajeda Khatun
- (India) Thounaojam Kritina Devi
- (India) Pratiksha Lakra
- (India) Santhiya
- (India) Pusparani Chanu
