= 2026 SAFF U-19 Women's Championship =

Tournament details
- Host country: Nepal
- Dates: 31 January–7 February 2026
- Teams: 4 (from 1 sub-confederation)
- Venue: 1 (in Pokhara host cities)

Final positions
- Champions: India (3rd title)
- Runners-up: Bangladesh

Tournament statistics
- Matches played: 7
- Goals scored: 34 (4.86 per match)
- Attendance: 1,606 (229 per match)
- Top scorer(s): (Bangladesh) Alpi Akter (7 goals)
- Best player: (Bangladesh) Alpi Akter
- Best goalkeeper: (India) Munni
- Fair play award: India

The 2026 SAFF U-19 Women's Championship was the 7th edition of the SAFF U-19 Women's Championship, an international youth football tournament contested by women's under-19 national teams from South Asia and organised by the South Asian Football Federation (SAFF). The tournament was held in Pokhara, Nepal, from 31 January to 7 February 2026, with four national teams participated.

India is the current champion having defeated Bangladesh by 4–0 goals in the final of the tournament on 7 February 2026.

== Host selection ==
The host nation for the tournament was selected by the South Asian Football Federation (SAFF) during a virtual meeting of its executive committee held on 20 November 2025 in Dhaka, Bangladesh. During the meeting, SAFF officials reviewed hosting arrangements and logistical preparedness before officially awarding the hosting rights to Nepal. The decision confirmed Nepal as the tournament venue and continued the country's role in staging regional youth women's football competitions under the SAFF umbrella.

== Participating nations ==
The following four nations took part in the tournament.

Legend

Did not participate

Country	Appearance	Previous best performance
Bangladesh	7th	Champions (2018, 2021, 2023, 2024 (Note: Bangladesh and India were the joint champion.), 2025)
Bhutan	6th	Fourth-place (2018, 2023, 2024)
India U17 (Note: Though the tournament is for U-20 age group, India fielded their U-17 team as a preparatory tournament for the 2026 AFC U-17 Women's Asian Cup.)	6th	Champions (2022, 2024)
Maldives		
Nepal (Host)	7th	Runners-up (2018, 2023)
Pakistan		
Sri Lanka		

The following squads were announced ahead of the tournament.

== Squads ==
The following squads were announced ahead of the tournament.

Bangladesh	Bhutan	India U17	Nepal (H)
Mst Yearzan Begum; Meghla Rani Roy; Ishita Tripura; Mst Joynob Bibi Rita; Arpita Biswas Arpita; Sorovi Rani; Kranuching Marma; Puja Das; Protima Munda; Mst Surovi Akter Afrin; Munki Akhter; Shanti Mardi; Mst Bonna Khatun; Rupa Akter; Mst Momita Khatun; Thuinuye Marma; Mst Mira Khatun; Sree Moti Trishna Rani; Alpi Akter; Mamoni Chakma; Purnima Marma; Ayonto Bala Mahato; Sauravi Akanda Prity; ★ Head coach: (England) Peter Butler	Dekhi Yangzom; Sonam Choden; Kelzang Yangmo; Ugyen Tshomo; Kinley Zangmo; Kinley Yangdon; Tenzin Lhazom; Kelzan Wangmo; Ngawang Choki; Sonam Yangden; Tshendu Tshering; Susmita Subba; Jingme T. Choden; Sonam Choden; Tsheing Lhamo; Pema Dekar; Chorten Zangmo; Pema Lhazin; Nima Wangmo; Sonam Choden; Tsheing Lham; Khandu Tshomo; Sangay Wangmo; ★ Head coach: (Bhutan) Tanka Maya Ghalley	Shelna Maria Sajit; Surajmuni Kumari; Munni Bhambhu; Akashi Naik; Alena Devi Sarangthem; Alisha Lyngdoh; Binita Horo; Divyani Linda; Elizabed Lakra; Joyshini Chanu Huidrom; Taniya Devi Tonambam; Abhista Basnett; Alva Devi Senjam; Anita Dungdung; Julan Nongmaithem; Pritika Barman; Redima Devi Chingkhamayum; Shveta Rani; Thandamoni Baskey; Anushka Kumari; Anwita Raghuraman; Pearl Fernandes; Valaina Fernandes; ★ Head coach: (Italy) Pamela Conti	Aliza BK; Anita Rana Magar; Ashika Karki; Barsha Kuwor; Barsha Oli; Bhumika Budhithoki; Gyansu Dolmo Lo; Jharna Dumrakoti; Juna Tamang; Kritisha Tamang; Maya Maski; Min Maya Shrestha; Nirmala Acharya; Prajita Rai; Purnima Tadi; Saara Limbu; Sabnam Rai; Saloni Kumari Chaudhary; Sangita Kumari Malla; Senu Paariyar; Srijana Baduwal; Sushila KC; Yam Kumari BK; ★ Head coach: (Nepal) Suman Shrestha

== Venue ==
All the matches were played at the Pokhara Rangasala in Pokhara, Nepal.

Pokhara	Pokhara is located in Nepal
Pokhara Rangasala	Pokhara is located in Nepal
Capacity: 18,500	Pokhara is located in Nepal

== Match officials ==
Referees

- (Bhutan Football Federation) Choki Om (†)
- (Bhutan Football Federation) Tshering Yangkey (†)
- (Bangladesh Football Federation) Saraban Tahura (†)
- (All India Football Federation) Mahi Tudu (†)
- (All Nepal Football Association) Anjana Rai (†)

Assistant Referees

- (Bangladesh Football Federation) Soahana Khatun
- (Bangladesh Football Federation) Salma Akter Mone
- (Bhutan Football Federation) Kinzang Choden
- (All India Football Federation) Sushmita Rai
- (All Nepal Football Association) Merina Dhimal

Referee Assessors

- (All Nepal Football Association) Bina Nawachhe Shrestha

Match commissioners

- (Bhutan Football Federation) Mindu Dorji
- (All India Football Federation) Suvrat Suresh Thatte

(†): Also performed as assistant referee and others role in some matches.

== Round robin ==
Each team will play each other. The top two teams contest in the final.

Key to colours in group tables
Table top two teams advance to the final

Tie-breaking criteria
Teams are ranked according to points (3 points for a win, 1 point for a draw, 0 points for a loss), and if tied on points, the following tie-breaking criteria are applied, in the order given, to determine the rankings.
1. Points in head-to-head matches among tied teams;
2. Goal difference in head-to-head matches among tied teams;
3. Goals scored in head-to-head matches among tied teams;
4. If more than two teams are tied, and after applying all head-to-head criteria above, a subset of teams are still tied, all head-to-head criteria above are reapplied exclusively to this subset of teams;
5. Goal difference in all group matches;
6. Goals scored in all group matches;
7. Disciplinary points (yellow card = 1 point, red card as a result of two yellow cards = 3 points, direct red card = 3 points, yellow card followed by direct red card = 4 points);
8. Drawing of lots.

- All times listed below are local, NST (UTC+05:45)

=== Standings ===
Pos	Team	Pld	W	D	L	GF	GA	GD	Pts	Qualification	BAN	IND	NEP	BHU
1	Bangladesh	3	3	0	0	18	0	+18	9	Qualified for the Final		2–0	4–0	12–0
2	India	3	2	0	1	9	2	+7	6	Qualified for the Final			1–0	8–0
3	Nepal	3	1	0	2	2	6	−4	3					2–1
4	Bhutan	3	0	0	3	1	22	−21	0					

Source: Sofascore
Legend: Blue = home team win; Yellow = draw; Red = away team win.
Rules for classification: 1) points; 2) head-to-head points; 3) head-to-head goal difference; 4) goal difference; 5) goals scored

=== Matches ===
31 January 2026
12:00
Match 1

Bangladesh	12–0	Bhutan
Chakma 28'; Rani 43', 54', 60'; Akhter 44', 45+3', 81', 90+3'; A. Akter 73', 86', 90+5'; Biswas 90+4'	Report

Pokhara Rangasala, Pokhara
Attendance: 30
Referee: Anjana Rai (Nepal)
31 January 2026
15:00
Match 2

India U17	1–0	Nepal
P. Fernandes 49'	Report

Pokhara Rangasala, Pokhara
Attendance: 116
Referee: Tshering Yangkey (Bhutan)

2 February 2026
12:00
Match 3

Bangladesh	2–0	India U17
Biswas 29'; A. Akter 40'	Report

Pokhara Rangasala, Pokhara
Attendance: 250
Referee: Choki Om (Bhutan)
2 February 2026
15:00
Match 4

Nepal	2–1	Bhutan
Baduwal 36'; Rai 69'	Report	Choden 87'

Pokhara Rangasala, Pokhara
Attendance: 470
Referee: Mahi Tudu (India)

4 February 2026
12:00
Match 5

India U17	8–0	Bhutan
Lyngdoh 6'; Basnett 10'; P. Fernandes 16', 38', 40'; Linda 17'; Barman 25', 89'	Report

Pokhara Rangasala, Pokhara
Attendance: 150
Referee: Saraban Tahura (Bangladesh)
4 February 2026
15:00
Match 6

Bangladesh	4–0	Nepal
Munda 3'; A. Akter 45+4', 67', 82'	Report

Pokhara Rangasala, Pokhara
Attendance: 340
Referee: Mahi Tudu (India)

== Final ==
7 February 2026
15:00

Bangladesh	0–4	India U17
	Report	Nongmaithem 42'; Lakra 63' (pen.); P. Fernandes 68'; Raghuraman 83'

Pokhara Rangasala, Pokhara
Attendance: 250
Referee: Om Choki (Bhutan)

== Winners ==
2026 SAFF U-20 Women's Championship Champions

India
3rd title

== Awards ==
The following awards were given at the conclusion of the tournament:

Most Valuable Player	Top Goalscorers	Best goalkeeper	Fair Play	Ref.
(Bangladesh) Alpi Akter	(Bangladesh) Alpi Akter	(India) Munni	India	

== Statistics ==
=== Goalscorers ===
There were 34 goals scored in 7 matches, for an average of 4.86 goals per match.

7 goals

- (Bangladesh) Alpi Akter

5 goals

- (India) Pearl Fernandes

4 goals

- (Bangladesh) Munki Akhter

3 goals

- (Bangladesh) Sree Moti Trishna Rani

2 goals

- (Bangladesh) Arpita Biswas
- (India) Pritika Barman

1 goal

- (Bangladesh) Mamoni Chakma
- (Bangladesh) Protima Munda
- (Bhutan) Sonam Choden
- (India) Abhista Basnett
- (India) Alisha Lyngdoh
- (India) Divyani Linda
- (India) Anwita Raghuraman
- (India) Elizabed Lakra
- (India) Julan Nongmaithem
- (Nepal) Prajita Rai
- (Nepal) Srijana Baduwal

Source: Sofascore

=== Hat trick ===
As of 7 February 2026

Player	Against	Result	Date	Ref
(Bangladesh) Munki Akhter^{4}	Bhutan	12–0	31 January 2026	
(Bangladesh) Alpi Akhter	Bhutan	12–0	31 January 2026	
(Bangladesh) Sree Moti Trishna Rani	Bhutan	12–0	31 January 2026	
(India) Pearl Fernandes	Bhutan	8–0	4 February 2026	
(Bangladesh) Alpi Akhter	Nepal	4–0	4 February 2026	

== Broadcasting ==
Broadcaster(s)	Territory	Reference
Sportzworkz^{(YouTube Channel)}	No restricted territory	SPORTZWORKZ

== See also ==
- 2026 SAFF U-20 Championship
- 2026 SAFF Championship
- 2026 SAFF Futsal Championship
- 2026 SAFF Club Championship
- 2026 SAFF U-17 Women's Championship
- 2026 SAFF Women's Championship
- 2026 SAFF Women's Futsal Championship
