= Bangladesh women's national under-20 football team =

National under-20 association football team

Bangladesh Women's U-20
- Association: Bangladesh Football Federation
- Confederation: AFC (Asia)
- Sub-confederation: SAFF (South Asia)
- Head coach: Peter James Butler
- Captain: Afeida Khandaker
- Home stadium: National Stadium, Dhaka
- FIFA code: BAN
First colours	Second colours

First international
- Bangladesh 0–6 Kyrgyzstan (Shiliguri, India; 7 March 2006)

Biggest win
- Bangladesh 17–0 Pakistan (Thimphu, Bhutan; 30 September 2018)

Biggest defeat
- Bangladesh 0–9 India (Siliguri, India; 9 March 2006)

FIFA U-20 Women's World Cup
- Appearances: 0

AFC U-20 Women's Asian Cup
- Appearances: 1 (first in 2026)
- Best result: Group stage (2026)

SAFF U-20 Women's Championship
- Appearances: 6 (first in 2018)
- Best result: Champions (2018, 2021, 2023, 2024, 2025)
Medal record
SAFF U-20 Women's Championship
Gold medal – first place	2025 Bangladesh
Gold medal – first place	2024 Bangladesh
Gold medal – first place	2023 Bangladesh
Gold medal – first place	2021 Bangladesh
Gold medal – first place	2018 Bhutan
Silver medal – second place	2022 India
Gold medal – first place	2023 Bangladesh
Gold medal – first place	2023 Bangladesh
Gold medal – first place	2025 Bangladesh
Silver medal – second place	2026 Nepal

Bangladesh women's national under-20 football team represents Bangladesh in international football competitions for players under the age of 20. The team competes in the FIFA U-20 Women's World Cup, AFC U-20 Women's Asian Cup as well as SAFF U-20 Women's Championship.

== Team image ==
=== Home stadium ===
The Bangladesh women's national under-20 football team plays their home matches on the National Stadium, which is situated In Dhaka.

== Results and fixtures ==
legend

Win Draw Loss Fixture

Since 2006 to present day all matches results are updated below in the table.

=== 2006 ===
7 March 2006 2006 AFC U-19 Women's Championship qual.	Bangladesh	0–6	Kyrgyzstan	India

9 March 2006 2006 AFC U-19 Women's Championship qual.	Bangladesh	0–9	India	India
				Attendance: 150

=== 2010 ===
20 September 2010 2011 AFC U-19 Women's Championship qual.	Bangladesh	1–6	Jordan	Dhaka, Bangladesh
19:00 UTC+6	Khatun 8'		Al Majali 34' (pen.) *Jebreen 37', 64', 90+2' *Assahwneh 75' *Abukhashabeh 87'	Stadium: Bir Sherestha Shaheed Shipahi Mostafa Kamal Stadium; Attendance: 10,000; Referee: Sato Nami (Japan)

22 September 2010 2011 AFC U-19 Women's Championship qual.	Bangladesh	0–6	Iran	Dhaka, Bangladesh
19:00 UTC+6			Naraghi 44', 60', 73' *Ghanbari 47' (pen.), 86' *Parvin 50'	Stadium: Bir Sherestha Shaheed Shipahi Mostafa Kamal Stadium; Attendance: 15,000; Referee: Kim Sooke-Hee (South Korea)

24 September 2010 2011 AFC U-19 Women's Championship qual.	Bangladesh	0–6	India	Dhaka, Bangladesh
19:00 UTC+6			Elangbam 39' *Salam 53', 73', 75', 78' *Bhutia 86'	Stadium: Bir Sherestha Shaheed Shipahi Mostafa Kamal Stadium; Attendance: 18,000; Referee: Rita Gani (Malaysia)

=== 2012 ===
20 October 2012 2013 AFC U-19 Women's Championship qualification Round 1	Bangladesh	0–1	India	Malacca, Malaysia
15:00 UTC+6			Nikhila 76'	Stadium: Hang Jebat Stadium; Attendance: 30; Referee: Kajiyama Fusako (Japan)

22 October 2012 2013 AFC U-19 Women's Championship qualification Round 1	Bangladesh	0–2	Uzbekistan	Malacca, Malaysia
15:00 UTC+6			Selime 20' *Mahliyo 56'	Stadium: Hang Jebat Stadium; Attendance: 50; Referee: Saltanat Noroozi (Iran)

=== 2018 ===
30 September 2018 2018 SAFF U-18 Women's Championship Group B	Bangladesh	17–0	Pakistan	Thimphu, Bhutan
19:00 UTC+6	Shopna 10', 30', 40', 62', 73', 76', 90'; Marzia 7', 13', 22', 71'; Moushumi 37'; Akhi 58'; Krishna 74'; Tohura 87'; Sheuli 32', 69' (pen.)			Stadium: Changlimithang Stadium

2 October 2018 2018 SAFF U-18 Women's Championship Group B	Bangladesh	2–1	Nepal	Thimphu, Bhutan
19:00 UTC+6	Shopna 16'; Krishna 32'		Rashmi Kumari Ghishing 90+2'	Stadium: Changlimithang Stadium

5 October 2018 2018 SAFF U-18 Women's Championship Semi finals	Bangladesh	4–0	Bhutan	Thimphu, Bhutan
19:00 UTC+6	Sanjida Akhter 2'; Moushumi 45+3'; Krishna 60'; Shamsunnahar 86' (pen.)			Stadium: Changlimithang Stadium

7 October 2018 2018 SAFF U-18 Women's Championship Final	Bangladesh	1–0	Nepal	Thimphu, Bhutan
	Masura Pravin 49'			Stadium: Changlimithang Stadium

=== 2019 ===
22 April 2019 2019 Bangamata U-19 Women's Gold Cup Group B	Bangladesh	2–0	United Arab Emirates	Dhaka, Bangladesh
18:00 UTC+6	Shopna 12' *Krishna 30'			Stadium: Bangabandhu National Stadium; Attendance: 9,414; Referee: Abdel Aqel (Jordan)

26 April 2019 2019 Bangamata U-19 Women's Gold Cup Group B	Bangladesh	2–1	Kyrgyzstan	Dhaka, Bangladesh
18:00 UTC+6	Sanjida Akhter 1' *Krishna 59'		Zairina 69'	Stadium: Bangabandhu National Stadium; Attendance: 4,220; Referee: Shen Yinhao (China)

=== 2025 ===
17 July 2025 2025 SAFF U-20 Women's Championship Round robin	Bangladesh	3–0	Bhutan	Dhaka, Bangladesh
19:00 BST (UTC+6)	Sree Moti Trishna Rani 33', 66' *Sapna 75'	Report		Stadium: Bashundhara Sports Ground; Attendance: 0 Referee: Y.A. Pabasara Minisaraniyapa (Sri Lanka)

19 July 2025 2025 SAFF U-20 Women's Championship Round robin	Bangladesh	5–0	Sri Lanka	Dhaka, Bangladesh
19:00 BST (UTC+6)	Kanon Bahadur 26' *Puja Das 45+2', 74' *Sree Moti Trishna Rani 86' *Afeida 90+7'	Report		Stadium: Bashundhara Sports Ground; Attendance: 0 Referee: Tshering Yangkhey (Bhutan)

21 July 2025 2025 SAFF U-20 Women's Championship Round robin	Bangladesh	4–0	Nepal	Dhaka, Bangladesh
19:00 BST (UTC+6)	Sagorika 8', 52', 58', 72'	Report		Stadium: Bashundhara Kings Arena; Attendance: 5,374; Referee: Rachana Hasmukh Kamani (India)

6 August 2025 2026 AFC U-20 Women's Asian Cup qualification Group H	Bangladesh	3–1	Laos	Vientiane, Laos
18:00 BST (UTC+6)	Sagorika 36', 90+2' *Munki 59'	Report	Keo Onsy 87'	Stadium: New Laos National Stadium; Referee: Fatemeh Nasiri (Iran)

8 August 2025 2026 AFC U-20 Women's Asian Cup qualification Group H	Bangladesh	8–0	Timor-Leste	Vientiane, Laos
15:00 BST (UTC+6)	Sikha 20' *Shanti 33' *Sagorika 36', 73' *Trishna 45+4', 57', 82' *Munki 90+6'	Report		Stadium: New Laos National Stadium; Referee: Roziyabonu Yusupova (Uzbekistan)

10 August 2025 2026 AFC U-20 Women's Asian Cup qualification Group H	Bangladesh	1–6	South Korea	Vientiane, Laos
15:00 BST (UTC+6)	Trishna 15'	Report	Lee Ha-eun 19', 87', 90' *Cho Hye-young 48', 60' *Jin Hye-rin 90+6'	Stadium: New Laos National Stadium; Referee: Anjana Rai (Nepal)

=== 2026 ===
31 January 2026 2026 SAFF U-19 Women's Championship Round-robin	Bangladesh	12–0	Bhutan	Pokhara, Nepal
12:15 BST (UTC+6)	Mamoni 28' *Trishna 43', 54', 60' *Munki 44', 45+3', 81', 90+3' *Alpi 73', 86', 90+5' *Arpita 90+4'	Report		Stadium: Pokhara Rangasala; Attendance: 30; Referee: Anjana Rai (Nepal)

2 February 2026 2026 SAFF U-19 Women's Championship Round-robin	Bangladesh	2–0	India U17	Pokhara, Nepal
12:15 BST (UTC+6)	Arpita 29' *Alpi 40'	Report		Stadium: Pokhara Rangasala; Attendance: 250; Referee: Om Choki (Bhutan)

4 February 2026 2026 SAFF U-19 Women's Championship Round-robin	Bangladesh	4–0	Nepal	Pokhara, Nepal
15:15 BST (UTC+6)	Munda 3' *A. Akter 45+4', 67', 82'	Report		Stadium: Pokhara Rangasala; Attendance: 340; Referee: Mahi Tudu (India)

7 February 2026 2026 SAFF U-19 Women's Championship Final	Bangladesh	0–4	India U17	Pokhara, Nepal
15:15 BST (UTC+6)		Report	Nongmaithem 42' *Lakra 63' (pen.) *P. Fernandes 68' *Raghuraman 83'	Stadium: Pokhara Rangasala; Attendance: 250; Referee: Om Choki (Bhutan)

25 March 2026 Closed Door Friendly	Bangladesh	1–1	India	Thailand
BST (UTC+6)	Umehla

27 March 2026 Closed Door Friendly	Bangladesh	2–0	Jordan	Thailand
BST (UTC+6)	Sauravi Akanda *Mamoni	Report

1 April 2026 2026 AFC U-20 Women's Asian Cup GS	Bangladesh	2–3	Thailand	Pathum Thani, Thailand
19:00 BST (UTC+6)	Sagorika 36', 50'	Report	Kurisara 69' (pen.) *Rinyaphat 76' (pen.) *Pichayatida 79'	Stadium: Thammasat Stadium; Attendance: 271; Referee: Azusa Sugino (Japan)

4 April 2026 2026 AFC U-20 Women's Asian Cup GS	Bangladesh	0–2	China	Nonthaburi, Thailand
19:00 BST (UTC+6)		Report	Yu Xingyue 47' *Wang Aifang 82'	Stadium: Nonthaburi Province Stadium; Attendance: 110; Referee: Rawdha Almansoori (United Arab Emirates)

7 April 2026 2026 AFC U-20 Women's Asian Cup GS	Bangladesh	0–1	Vietnam	Nonthaburi, Thailand
19:00 BST (UTC+6)		Report	Nguyễn Thị Thùy Linh 49'	Stadium: Nonthaburi Province Stadium; Attendance: 36; Referee: Yang Shu-ting (Chinese Taipei)

== Coaching staff ==
=== Current coaching staff ===
As of 30 March 2026 (Source)

Position	Name
Head Coach	(England) Peter James Butler
Assistant Coaches	(Bangladesh) Abul Hossain (Bangladesh) Lina Chakma
Goalkeeping Coach	(Bangladesh) Masud Ahamad
Strength & Conditioning Coach	(England) Cameron Nicholas Lord
Team Doctor	(Bangladesh) Nowrin Parvez
Physiotherapist	(Bangladesh) Zakia Rahman
Video Analyst	(Bangladesh) Md Emran Hasan Emon
Team Manager	(Bangladesh) Khalid Mahmud Nowmee
Media Manager	(Bangladesh) Md Saeed Hasan
Videographer	(Bangladesh) Anisur Rahman
Kitman	(Bangladesh) Md Rashibul Hossain

=== Manager history ===
- (Bangladesh) Golam Robbani (2009–2023)
- (Bangladesh) Saiful Bari Titu (2023–2024)
- (England) Peter James Butler (2025–present)

== Players ==
=== Current squad ===
The following 23 players were named in the squad for the 2026 AFC U-20 Women's Asian Cup.

No.	Pos.	Player	Date of birth (age)	Caps	Goals	Club
	GK	Mile Akter				(Bangladesh Football Federation) Nasrin Sporting Academy
	GK	Swarna Rani Mandal				(Bangladesh Football Federation) Farashganj SC
	GK	Mst Momita Khatun				(Bangladesh Football Federation) Bangladesh Army
	DF	Afeida Khandaker				(Bangladesh Football Federation) Nasrin Sporting Academy
	DF	Mst Fardosi Akter Shonale				(Bangladesh Football Federation) Nasrin Sporting Academy
	DF	Mst Surma Jannat				(Bangladesh Football Federation) Nasrin Sporting Academy
	DF	Nabiran Khatun				(Bangladesh Football Federation) Nasrin Sporting Academy
	DF	Sinha Jahan Shikha				(Bangladesh Football Federation) BKSP
	DF	Mst Joynob Bibi Rita				(Bangladesh Football Federation) Bangladesh Army
	DF	Arpita Biswas Arpita				(Bangladesh Football Federation) Bangladesh Army
	DF	Mst Surovi Akter Arfin				(Bangladesh Football Federation) Bangladesh Army
	MF	Sapna Rani				(Bangladesh Football Federation) Nasrin Sporting Academy
	MF	Umehla Marma				(Bangladesh Football Federation) Nasrin Sporting Academy
	MF	Nadia Akter Juti				(Bangladesh Football Federation) Nasrin Sporting Academy
	MF	Most Munki Akhter				(Bangladesh Football Federation) Rajshahi Stars FC
	MF	Puja Das				(Bangladesh Football Federation) Rajshahi Stars FC
	MF	Shanti Mardi				(Bangladesh Football Federation) Bangladesh Army
	MF	Sorovi Rani				(Bangladesh Football Federation) Nasrin Sporting Academy
	FW	Mst Sagorika				(Bangladesh Football Federation) Nasrin Sporting Academy
	FW	Sauravi Akanda Prity				(Bangladesh Football Federation) Rajshahi Stars FC
	FW	Sree Moti Trishna Rani				(Bangladesh Football Federation) Rajshahi Stars FC
	FW	Mamoni Chakma				(Bangladesh Football Federation) Bangladesh Ansar
	FW	Alpi Akter				(Bangladesh Football Federation) Rajshahi Stars FC

=== Captains ===
- Mishrat Jahan Moushumi (2016–2019)
- Maria Manda (2020–2022)
- Afeida Khandaker (2023–2025)
- Arpita Biswas (2026 – present)

== Competitive record ==
=== FIFA U-20 Women's World Cup ===
FIFA U-20 Women's World Cup record
Host	Result	Position	Pld	W	D	L	GF	GA
(Canada) 2002	Did not qualify							
(Thailand) 2004	Did not qualify							
(Russia) 2006	Did not qualify							
(Chile) 2008	Did not qualify							
(Germany) 2010	Did not qualify							
(Japan) 2012	Did not qualify							
(Canada) 2014	Did not qualify							
(Papua New Guinea) 2016	Did not qualify							
(France) 2018	Did not qualify							
(Costa Rica) 2022	Did not qualify							
(Colombia) 2024	Did not qualify							
(Poland) 2026	Did not qualify							
Total	0/12	0 Titles	0	0	0	0	0	0

*Draws include knock-out matches decided on penalty kicks.

=== AFC U-20 Women's Asian Cup ===
AFC U-20 Women's Asian Cup record
Host	Result	Position	Pld	W	D	L	GF	GA
(India) 2002	Did not enter							
(China) 2004	Did not enter							
(Malaysia) 2006	Did not qualify							
(China) 2007	Did not enter							
(China) 2009	Did not enter							
(Vietnam) 2011	Did not qualify							
(China) 2013	Did not qualify							
(China) 2015	Did not enter							
(China) 2017	Did not enter							
(Thailand) 2019	Did not qualify							
(Uzbekistan) ~~2022~~	Cancelled							
(Uzbekistan) 2024	Did not qualify							
(Thailand) 2026	Group stage	10th	3	0	0	3	2	6
Total	1/12	0 Title	3	0	0	3	2	6

*Draws include knock-out matches decided on penalty kicks.

=== AFC U-20 Women's Asian Cup qualification ===
AFC U-20 Women's Asian Cup qualification records
Hosts / Year	Result	GP	W	D	L	GS	GA
(India) 2002	Did Not Participate						
(China) 2004	Did Not Participate						
(Malaysia) 2006	DNQ	2	0	0	2	0	15
(China) 2007	Did Not Participate						
(China) 2009	Did Not Participate						
(Vietnam) 2011	DNQ	3	0	0	3	1	18
(China) 2013	DNQ	2	0	0	2	0	3
(China) 2015	Did Not Participate						
(China) 2017	Did Not Participate						
(Thailand) 2019	DNQ	3	1	0	2	5	10
(Uzbekistan) ~~2022~~	Cancelled						
(Uzbekistan) 2024	DNQ	2	1	0	1	4	1
(Thailand) 2026	Qualified	3	2	0	1	12	7
Total	6/12	15	4	0	11	22	54

=== SAFF U-19/U-20 Women's Championship ===
SAFF U-19/U-20 Women's Championship records
Hosts/Year	Result	GP	W	D	L	GS	GA	GD
(Bhutan) 2018	Champion	4	4	0	0	24	1	+23
(Bangladesh) 2021	Champion	5	4	1	0	20	0	+20
(India) 2022	Runners-up	4	3	0	1	7	4	+3
(Bangladesh) 2023	Champion	4	3	1	0	11	1	+10
(Bangladesh) 2024	Champion	4	3	1	0	9	2	+7
(Bangladesh) 2025	Champion	6	6	0	0	28	4	+24
(Nepal) 2026	Runners-up	4	3	0	1	18	4	+14
Total	7/7	31	26	3	2	117	16	+101

== Head-to-head records ==
More wins Wins equal losses More losses

As of 7 April 2026

Against	Region	P	W	D	L	GF	GA	GD	%Win
Bhutan	AFC	7	7	0	0	38	1	+37	100.00
China	AFC	1	0	0	1	0	2	−2	0.00
Chinese Taipei	AFC	1	0	0	1	0	2	−2	0.00
India	AFC	11	4	3	4	6	19	−13	36.36
India U17	AFC	2	1	0	1	2	4	−2	50.00
Iran	AFC	2	0	0	2	0	7	−7	0.00
Jordan	AFC	2	1	0	1	3	6	−3	50.00
Kyrgyzstan	AFC	2	1	0	1	2	7	−5	50.00
Laos	AFC	1	1	0	0	3	1	+2	100.00
Mongolia	AFC	1	1	0	0	3	0	+3	100.00
Nepal	AFC	11	10	1	0	29	8	+21	90.91
Pakistan	AFC	1	1	0	0	17	0	+17	100.00
South Korea	AFC	2	0	0	2	1	13	−12	0.00
Sri Lanka	AFC	3	3	0	0	26	1	+25	100.00
Tajikistan	AFC	1	1	0	0	5	1	+4	100.00
Timor-Leste	AFC	1	1	0	0	8	0	+8	100.00
Thailand	AFC	1	0	0	1	2	3	−1	0.00
Turkmenistan	AFC	1	1	0	0	4	0	+4	100.00
United Arab Emirates	AFC	1	1	0	0	2	0	+2	100.00
Uzbekistan	AFC	1	0	0	1	0	2	−2	0.00
Vietnam	AFC	1	0	0	1	0	1	−1	0.00
Total	19 nations	54	34	4	16	149	78	+71	62.96

== Honours ==
- SAFF U-20 Women's Championship

Champion (5): 2018, 2021, 2023, 2024, 2025

- Bangamata U-19 Women's International Gold Cup

Champion trophy shared (1): 2019

== See also ==
- Sport in Bangladesh
  - Football in Bangladesh
    - Women's football in Bangladesh
- Bangladesh women's national football team
- Bangladesh women's national under-17 football team
- Bangladesh national football team
- Bangladesh national under-20 football team
- Bangladesh national under-17 football team
