= Sapna Rani =

Bangladeshi professional footballer (born 2006)

Sapna Rani স্বপ্না রানী
Personal information
- Date of birth: 9 May 2006 (age 20)
- Place of birth: Thakurgaon, Bangladesh
- Height: 1.57 m (5 ft 2 in)
- Position: Midfielder

Team information
- Current team: Rajshahi Stars

Youth career
- —2020: Rangatungi United
- BKSP

Senior career*
Years	Team	Apps	(Gls)
2020	Nasrin	12	(14)
2021–2024	ARB College	33	(23)
2025	Royal Thimphu College	4	(1)
2025–	Rajshahi Stars	9	(2)

International career^{‡}
2019	Bangladesh U17		
2022–2026	Bangladesh U20	25	(3)
2022–	Bangladesh	26	(1)
Medal record
Women's football
Representing Bangladesh
SAFF Women's Championship
Winner	2024 Nepal
SAFF U-18 Women's Championship
Winner	2025 Bangladesh
Winner	2024 Bangladesh
Winner	2023 Bangladesh
Runner-up	2022 India
SAFF U-15 Women's Championship
Runner-up	2019 Bhutan
- * Club domestic league appearances and goals as of 4 March 2026 ‡ National team caps and goals as of 7 April 2026

Sapna Rani (Bengali: স্বপ্না রানী IPA: [ʃɔpna ɾani]; born 9 May 2006) is a Bangladeshi women's professional footballer who plays as a midfielder for Rajshahi Stars and the Bangladesh national team.

== Early life ==
Sapna Rani was born in the village of Rangatungi in Thakurgaon, Bangladesh. She comes from the village of Shiyaldangi in Ranisankail Upazila of the district.

She began her football career at the Rangatungi United Football Academy, an institution known for developing several female players who have gone on to represent the national team.

Rani was later admitted to BKSP, where she continued her football development. In 2019, she was part of the BKSP team that won the under-17 girls' title at the Subroto Cup.

== Club career ==
=== ARB College ===
Sapna played for ARB College in the Bangladesh Women's Football League since the club's formation in 2021. During the 2020–21 season of the Bangladesh Women's Football League, her club, ARB College Sporting Club, finished as the runner-up.

=== Royal Thimphu College ===
In 2025, Sapna joined Bhutan Women's National League club Royal Thimphu College. She scored a goal for the club in the 2025–26 AFC Women's Champions League.

=== Rajshahi Stars ===
Sapna joined Rajshahi Stars for the 2025–26 Bangladesh Women's Football League. She scored a goal for the club in her debut match.

== International career ==
In 2019, Sapna Rani received her first call-up to Bangladesh U-17. Later, in March 2022, she played in the 2018 SAFF U-18 Women's Championship held in India, where Bangladesh finished as runners-up. She was part of the Bangladesh squad for the 2022 SAFF Women's Championship held in Nepal. During the tournament, Bangladesh achieved a historic 3–0 victory in the group stage, their first-ever against India in senior women's football. Bangladesh ultimately won the 2022 SAFF title, defeating Nepal in the final.

In the 2024 SAFF U-19 Women's Championship, Sapna featured for Bangladesh in a 1–1 draw against India in the final, with the match proceeding to a penalty shootout. After all 11 players from both sides converted their penalties, officials controversially attempted to decide the winner by a coin toss. Following protests and review of the tournament rules, teams were declared joint champions. In October 2024, Sapna Rani was named in the Bangladesh squad for the 2024 SAFF Women's Championship, where the team retained their title with a 2–1 victory over Nepal in the final. Bangladesh qualified for the AFC Women's Asian Cup for the first time in history by finishing top of Group C in the qualifiers. The team secured dominant victories over Bahrain (7–0), Myanmar (2–1), and Turkmenistan (7–0), collecting all nine points from three matches. In the final match, Sapna contributed to the win by scoring one of Bangladesh's seven goals against Turkmenistan.

== Style of play ==
Sapna Rani primarily plays as a central midfielder and has been deployed in both holding and box-to-box midfield roles. She is known for her positional awareness, work rate and her ability to scan space.

== Career statistics ==
=== International ===
As of match played 5 July 2025

List of international goals
No.	Date	Venue	Opponent	Score	Result	Competition
1	5 July 2025	Thuwunna Stadium, Yangon, Myanmar	Turkmenistan	1–0	7–0	2026 AFC Women's Asian Cup qualification

== Personal life ==
In addition to football, Sapna has also played cricket and has represented Rangatungi School in Thakurgaon as a wicketkeeper-batter.

== Honours ==
Royal Thimphu College

- Bhutan Women's National League: 2025

Rajshahi Stars

- Bangladesh Women's Football League: 2025–26

Bangladesh U20

- SAFF U-20 Women's Championship: 2024, 2025

Bangladesh

- SAFF Women's Championship: 2024
