= Sri Lanka women's national under-20 football team =

Sri Lanka Women's U-20
- Association: Football Federation of Sri Lanka
- Confederation: AFC (Asia)
- Sub-confederation: SAFF (South Asia)
- Head coach: (Sri Lanka) Manjula Chaminda
- Captain: Imesha Warnakulasuriya
- FIFA code: SRI
First colours	Second colours

First international
- Sri Lanka 0–0 Palestine (Colombo, Sri Lanka; 7 November 2014)

Biggest defeat
- Sri Lanka 0–12 Bangladesh (Dhaka, Bangladesh; 19 December 2021)

SAFF U-20 Women's Championship
- Appearances: 2 (first in 2021)
- Best result: Fourth place (2025)

The Sri Lanka women's national under-20 football team is the national under-20 team of Sri Lanka that represents the Sri Lanka in international football competitions including the SAFF U-20 Women's Championship, the AFC U-20 Women's Asian Cup and the FIFA U-20 Women's World Cup, as well as any other under-20 international football tournaments. The team is governed by the Football Federation of Sri Lanka and is a member of the Asian Football Confederation (AFC).

== Home stadium ==
The Sri Lanka women's national under-20 football team plays their home matches on the Sugathadasa Stadium.

== Players ==
- The following players were called up for 2021 SAFF U-19 Women's Championship.

No.	Pos.	Player	Date of birth (age)	Club
1	GK	Tharindi Janithya	6 January 2004 (age 22)	(Football Federation of Sri Lanka)
2	DF	Chinthani Vishmika Banfara	8 February 2003 (age 23)	(Football Federation of Sri Lanka)
3	MF	Tharindi Ranshari	29 September 2003 (age 22)	(Football Federation of Sri Lanka)
4	DF	Rashmi Kavisha	8 July 2003 (age 23)	(Football Federation of Sri Lanka)
5	MF	Irohani Sewmali	20 September 2004 (age 21)	(Football Federation of Sri Lanka)
6	MF	Jokitha Uruthirakumar	9 February 2004 (age 22)	(Football Federation of Sri Lanka)
7	MF	Uthpala Kavindi Jayakodi	2 December 2003 (age 22)	(Football Federation of Sri Lanka)
8	MF	Maleeka Shaahaani Amith	29 May 2004 (age 22)	(Football Federation of Sri Lanka)
10	FW	Kirushanthini Rakuthas	27 March 2004 (age 22)	(Football Federation of Sri Lanka)
11	FW	Geethma Senuri Bandara	22 February 2003 (age 23)	(Football Federation of Sri Lanka)
12	FW	Sanduni Nisandala Kumarihami	2 August 2004 (age 22)	(Football Federation of Sri Lanka)
13	MF	Senuri Kavindya Gallage	10 July 2004 (age 22)	(Football Federation of Sri Lanka)
15	FW	Pabasara Methmini Ekanayake	12 March 2004 (age 22)	(Football Federation of Sri Lanka)
16	DF	Hasini Kawshalya Jayasekarage	17 June 2004 (age 22)	(Football Federation of Sri Lanka)
17	MF	Imesha Warnakulasuriya (Captain)	7 February 2004 (age 22)	(Football Federation of Sri Lanka)
18	DF	Tharmika Sivaneswaran	26 July 2004 (age 22)	(Football Federation of Sri Lanka)
19	MF	Amavi Anuththara Kahatapitiya	20 September 2004 (age 21)	(Football Federation of Sri Lanka)
20	MF	Valantina Mariyanayakam	15 February 2004 (age 22)	(Football Federation of Sri Lanka)
21	DF	Nimesha Sadaruwani Bandara	2 November 2004 (age 21)	(Football Federation of Sri Lanka)
22	GK	Onethra Sankalani Bandara	2 January 2004 (age 22)	(Football Federation of Sri Lanka)
23	GK	Jayasundara Mudiyanselage	7 August 2004 (age 22)	(Football Federation of Sri Lanka)

== Fixtures ==
The following is a list of match results in the last 12 months, as well as any future matches that have been scheduled.

Legend

Win Draw Loss Fixture

== Competitive record ==
=== FIFA U-20 Women's World Cup ===
FIFA U-20 Women's World Cup record
Host	Result	Position	Pld	W	D	L	GF	GA
(Canada) 2002	Did not qualify							
(Thailand) 2004	Did not qualify							
(Russia) 2006	Did not qualify							
(Chile) 2008	Did not qualify							
(Germany) 2010	Did not qualify							
(Japan) 2012	Did not qualify							
(Canada) 2014	Did not qualify							
(Papua New Guinea) 2016	Did not qualify							
(France) 2018	Did not qualify							
(Costa Rica) 2022	Did not qualify							
(Colombia) 2024	Did not enter							
(Poland) 2026	To be determined							
Total	0/12	0 Titles	0	0	0	0	0	0

*Draws include knock-out matches decided on penalty kicks.

=== AFC U-19/U-20 Women's Asian Cup ===
AFC U-19/U-20 Women's Asian Cup record
Host	Result	Position	Pld	W	D	L	GF	GA
(India) 2002	Did not qualify							
(China) 2004	Did not qualify							
(Malaysia) 2006	Did not qualify							
(China) 2007	Did not qualify							
(China) 2009	Did not qualify							
(Vietnam) 2011	Did not qualify							
(China) 2013	Did not qualify							
(China) 2015	Did not qualify							
(China) 2017	Did not qualify							
(Thailand) 2019	Did not qualify							
(Uzbekistan) ~~2022~~	Cancelled							
Total	0/11	0 Titles	0	0	0	0	0	0

*Draws include knock-out matches decided on penalty kicks.

=== AFC U-19/U-20 Women's Asian Cup qualification ===
AFC U-19/U-20 Women's Championship qualification record
Hosts / Year	Result	GP	W	D	L	GS	GA
(India) 2002	Did Not Participate						
(China) 2004	Did Not Participate						
(Malaysia) 2006	Did Not Participate						
(China) 2007	Did Not Participate						
(China) 2009	Did Not Participate						
(Vietnam) 2011	Did Not Participate						
(China) 2013	Did Not Participate						
(China) 2015	Did Not Participate						
(China) 2017	Did Not Participate						
(Thailand) 2019	Did Not Participate						
(Uzbekistan) ~~2022~~	Cancelled						
(Uzbekistan) 2024	To be determined						
Total	0/10	0	0	0	0	0	0

=== SAFF U-18/U-19/U-20 Women's Championship ===
SAFF U-18/U-19/U-20 Women's Championship record
Year	Result	GP	W	D*	L	GF	GA	GD
(Bhutan) 2018	Did Not Participate							
(Bangladesh) 2021	Group stage	4	0	0	4	0	28	–28
(India) 2022	Did Not Participate							
(Bangladesh) 2023	Did Not Participate							
(Bangladesh) 2024	Did Not Participate							
(Bangladesh) 2025	Fourth place	6	0	0	0	1	38	–37
Total	2/6	4	0	0	4	1	66	–65

*Draws include knock-out matches decided on penalty kicks.

== Head-to-head record ==
As of 31 January 2026

Against	Region	P	W	D	L	GF	GA	GD	%Win
Bangladesh	AFC	3	0	0	3	1	38	−37	0.00
India	AFC	1	0	0	1	0	5	−5	0.00
Nepal	AFC	3	0	0	3	0	19	−19	0.00
Bhutan	AFC	3	0	0	3	0	15	−15	0.00
Palestine	AFC	1	0	1	0	0	0	+0	0.00
Iran	AFC	1	0	0	1	1	4	−3	0.00
Total	6 nations	15	0	1	14	2	61	−59	0.00
