= Afeida Khandaker =

Bangladeshi footballer (born 2006)

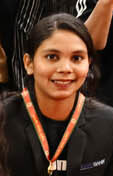
- Afeida in 2024

Personal information
- Full name: Afeida Khandaker Pranti
- Date of birth: 18 November 2006 (age 19)
- Place of birth: Satkhira, Bangladesh
- Height: 1.68 m (5 ft 6 in)
- Position: Centre-back

Team information
- Current team: Rajshahi Stars
- Number: 4

Youth career
- 2016–2018: BKSP

Senior career*
| Years | Team | Apps | (Gls) |
| 2021–2024 | ARB College | 33 | (5) |
| 2025 | Royal Thimphu College | 3 | (0) |
| 2025– | Rajshahi Stars | 10 | (2) |

International career^{‡}
| 2019 | Bangladesh U17 | 4 | (0) |
| 2021– | Bangladesh U20 | 29 | (5) |
| 2023– | Bangladesh | 33 | (4) |
Medal record
Women's football
Representing Bangladesh
SAFF Women's Championship
| Winner | 2024 Nepal |
SAFF U-18 Women's Championship
| Winner | 2024 Bangladesh |
| Winner | 2023 Bangladesh |
| Winner | 2021 Bangladesh |
SAFF U-15 Women's Championship
| Runner-up | 2019 Bhutan |
- * Club domestic league appearances and goals as of 19 February 2026 ‡ National team caps and goals as of 21 September 2026

Afeida Khandaker Pranti (Bengali: আফঈদা খন্দকার প্রান্তি IPA: [afida kʰɔndokaɾ pɾanti]; born 18 November 2006) is a Bangladeshi professional footballer who plays as a centre-back for Rajshahi Stars and the Bangladesh national team.

== Early life ==
Born in Satkhira District, Afeida Khandaker comes from a sporting family. Her father coached her early development in football when she accompanied her elder sister to trials for the BKSP. In 2016, she was admitted there as a fifth-grade student at its Savar campus, marking the formal beginning of her football journey. She continued her education alongside football, and in 2018, she was selected for the national training camp.

In 2019, while representing BKSP at the Subroto Cup, she was named the tournament's Best Player as BKSP won the under-17 girls’ title.

== Club career ==
=== ARB College ===
Afeida played for ARB College in the Bangladesh Women's Football League since the club's formation in 2021.

=== Royal Thimphu College ===
In 2025, Afeida joined Bhutan Women's National League club Royal Thimphu College.

=== Rajshahi Stars ===
On 22 December 2025, Newcomer Rajshahi Stars fielded a strong squad in the Bangladesh Women's Football League with the inclusion of national women's team captain Afeida Khandaker. Afeida scored a goal in her debut for the club, contributing to a 12–0 win.

== International career ==
=== Youth ===
In February 2024, Afeida Khandaker captained the Bangladesh U‑19 women's team at the 2024 SAFF U‑19 Women's Championship held in Bangladesh. The team advanced to the final by topping their group unbeaten, including a 4–0 win over Bhutan. In the final against India, the match ended 1–1 after regular time, and both teams converted all 11 penalties. The on-field referees initially attempted to decide the winner by a coin toss, favoring India, which led to significant protests. Upon review, officials recognized that the tournament's rules did not allow a coin toss outcome and instead declared both teams as joint champions.

=== Senior ===
In May 2025, Afeida Khandaker was named the captain of the Bangladesh senior national team for a tri-nation series in Jordan, which included hosts Jordan and Indonesia. This appointment followed a player rebellion earlier that year, where 18 senior footballers, including former captain Sabina Khatun, protested against head coach Peter Butler and boycotted the training camp. Consequently, Afeida received the captaincy after several experienced players were omitted from the squad.

The tri-nation series in Jordan served as preparation for the 2026 AFC Women's Asian Cup Qualifiers. Under Khandaker's captaincy, the Bangladesh women's football team remained unbeaten against higher-ranked opponents. On May 31, 2025, Bangladesh held Indonesia to a goalless draw in Amman. Later, on June 3, 2025, they played a 2–2 draw against host nation Jordan, coming from behind twice in the match.

Bangladesh secured qualification for the 2026 AFC Women's Asian Cup for the first time in history. The team topped Group C in the 2026 qualifiers with, defeating Bahrain 7–0, Myanmar 2–1, and Turkmenistan 7–0, finishing with nine points from three matches. The historic qualification was confirmed after a 2–2 draw between Bahrain and Turkmenistan ensured Bangladesh's top position in the group.

== Career statistics ==
=== International ===
As of match played 5 July 2025
Scores and results list Bangladesh's goal tally first, score column indicates score after each Afeida Khandaker goal.

List of international goals scored by Afeida Khandaker
| No. | Date | Venue | Opponent | Score | Result | Competition |
|---|---|---|---|---|---|---|
| 1 | 1 December 2023 | BSSS Mostafa Kamal Stadium, Dhaka, Bangladesh | Singapore | 1–0 | 3–0 | Friendly |
| 2 | 23 October 2024 | Dasharath Rangasala, Kathmandu, Nepal | India | 1–0 | 3–1 | 2024 SAFF Women's Championship |
| 3 | 26 February 2025 | Theyab Awana Stadium, Dubai, United Arab Emirates | United Arab Emirates | 1–2 | 1–3 | Friendly |
| 4 | 2 March 2025 | Theyab Awana Stadium, Dubai, United Arab Emirates | United Arab Emirates | 1–3 | 1–3 | Friendly |

== Personal life ==
Her father, Khandaker Arif Hasan, is a former footballer who played for the Satkhira district team, the Khulna divisional youth team, and Dhaka's Shantinagar Club in the second division during 1989–90. He currently runs a local football training center and coaches gymnastics and boxing. Her mother, Momtaz Khatun, was involved in athletics and served on the Satkhira District Women's Sports Association, receiving the “Adommo Nari” award in Khulna division in 2024. Afeida's elder sister, Afra Khandaker, is a national-level boxer and former BKSP student. Afeida joined BKSP in 2016, while Afra enrolled in 2017 for boxing.

Afeida completed her Higher Secondary Certificate (HSC) in 2024.

== Honours ==
Royal Thimphu College

- Bhutan Women's National League: 2025

Rajshahi Stars

- Bangladesh Women's Football League: 2025–26

Bangladesh U20

- SAFF U-20 Women's Championship: 2021, 2024, 2025

Bangladesh

- SAFF Women's Championship: 2024
