= Pakistan women's national under-20 football team =

Women's under-20 national association football team representing Pakistan

Pakistan Women's U-20
- Nickname(s): Green Shirts, Pak Shaheens
- Association: Pakistan Football Federation
- Confederation: AFC (Asia)
- Sub-confederation: SAFF (South Asia)
- Head coach: Siddique Sheikh
- Captain: Rameen Fareed
- FIFA code: PAK
First colours	Second colours

First international
- Nepal 12–0 Pakistan (Thimphu, Bhutan; 28 September 2018)

Biggest defeat
- India 18–0 Pakistan (Chonburi, Thailand; 24 October 2018); Pakistan 0–18 Thailand (Chonburi, Thailand; 26 October 2018)

SAFF Championship
- Appearances: 1 (first in 2018)
- Best result: Group Stage (2018)

The Pakistan women's national under-20 football team is a youth women's football team operated under the Pakistan Football Federation. The team has so far represented Pakistan at the AFC U-20 Women's Asian Cup and the SAFF U-20 Women's Championship.

== Current players ==
The following squad were called up for recently ended 2019 AFC U-19 Women's Championship qualification.

No.	Pos.	Player	Date of birth (age)	Caps	Goals	Club
1	GK	Tooba Idris Dar				
2	DF	Arfana Aslam				
3	DF	Mishal Akram				
4	MF	Maliha Nasir				
5	DF	Sonam Kamal				
6	FW	Javeria Chaudhry				
7	FW	Eeshal Fayyaz				
8	MF	Syeda Dua Gilani			{{{goals}}}	
9	DF	Hajima				
10	MF	Rameen Fareed				
11	MF	Eman Fayyaz				
12	MF	Anushka Rasheed				
14	DF	Najiha Aivi				
16	FW	Rubab Arif				
17	FW	Mehreen Gul				
18	GK	Zainob Noor				
19	DF	Meeral Arif				
18	GK	Sahar Zaman				

== Fixtures and results ==
legend

Win Draw Loss Fixture

== Competitive record ==
=== FIFA U-20 Women's World Cup ===
FIFA U-20 Women's World Cup record
Host	Result	Position	Pld	W	D	L	GF	GA
(Canada) 2002	Did not qualify							
(Thailand) 2004	Did not qualify							
(Russia) 2006	Did not qualify							
(Chile) 2008	Did not qualify							
(Germany) 2010	Did not qualify							
(Japan) 2012	Did not qualify							
(Canada) 2014	Did not qualify							
(Papua New Guinea) 2016	Did not qualify							
(France) 2018	Did not qualify							
(Costa Rica) 2022	Did not qualify							
(Colombia) 2024	Did not enter							
(Poland) 2026	To be determined							
Total	0/12	0 Titles	0	0	0	0	0	0

*Draws include knock-out matches decided on penalty kicks.

=== AFC U-20/U-19 Women's Asian Cup qualification ===
AFC U-20/U-19 Women's Asian Cup qualification record
Hosts / Year	Result	GP	W	D	L	GS	GA
(India) 2002	Did Not Participate						
(China) 2004	Did Not Participate						
(Malaysia) 2006	Did Not Participate						
(China) 2007	Did Not Participate						
(China) 2009	Did Not Participate						
(Vietnam) 2011	Did Not Participate						
(China) 2013	Did Not Participate						
(China) 2015	Did Not Participate						
(China) 2017	Did Not Participate						
(Thailand) 2019	Did not qualify						
(Uzbekistan) 2022	Cancelled						
(Uzbekistan) 2024	Withdrew						
(Thailand) 2026	Did Not Participate						
Total	0/12	0	0	0	0	0	0

=== SAFF U-18/U-19/U-20 Women's Championship ===
SAFF U-18/U-19/U-20 Women's Championship record
Year	Result	GP	W	D*	L	GF	GA	GD
(Bhutan) 2018	Group stage	2	0	0	2	0	29	–29
(Bangladesh) 2021	Did Not Participate							
(India) 2022	Did Not Participate							
(Bangladesh) 2023	Did Not Participate							
(Bangladesh) 2024	Did Not Participate							
(Bangladesh) 2025	Did Not Participate							
(Bangladesh) 2026	Did Not Participate							
Total	1/6	2	0	0	2	0	29	–29

*Draws include knock-out matches decided on penalty kicks.

== See also ==
- Pakistan national under-20 football team
