= Mst Sagorika =

Bangladeshi footballer (born 2007)

Personal information
- Full name: Mosammat Sagorika
- Date of birth: 1 December 2007 (age 18)
- Place of birth: Thakurgaon, Bangladesh
- Height: 1.55 m (5 ft 1 in)
- Positions: Striker; winger

Team information
- Current team: Bangladesh Police

Youth career
- —2022: Rangatungi United
- BKSP

Senior career*
Years	Team	Apps	(Gls)
2022	Brahmanbaria	11	(10)
2024	ARB College	8	(15)
2025–	Bangladesh Police	10	(13)

International career^{‡}
2023	Bangladesh U17	9	(2)
2024–	Bangladesh U20	13	(18)
2024–	Bangladesh	17	(5)
Medal record
Women's football
Representing Bangladesh
SAFF Women's Championship
Winner	2024 Nepal
SAFF U-20 Women's Championship
Winner	2025 Bangladesh
Winner	2024 Bangladesh
- * Club domestic league appearances and goals as of 16 February 2026 ‡ National team caps and goals as of 6 June 2026

Mosammat Sagorika (Bengali: মোসাম্মৎ সাগরিকা IPA: [mosamːɔt ʃaɡorika]; born 1 December 2007) is a Bangladeshi professional footballer who plays as a striker or winger for Bangladesh Police and the Bangladesh national team.

== Early life ==
Mosammat Sagorika was born on 1 December 2007, in Rangatungi village of Ranisankail, Thakurgaon. Her father, Liton Ali, runs a tea stall located in the Bolidara area on the Ranisankail-Haripur Upazila road, while her brother a former footballer, had to leave the game due to financial impediments. She began her football career at Rangatungi United Football Academy, which specializes in women's football and is located near her village.

== Club career ==
=== Brahmanbaria ===
Sagorika represented Brahmanbaria in the 2021–22 Bangladesh Women's League, scoring 10 goals in 11 games, including a hat-trick against Farashganj.

=== ARB College ===
Sagorika played for ARB College in the 2023–24 Bangladesh Women's League, scoring 15 goals in 8 games. During the season she struck a hat-trick against both Dhaka Rangers and Saddapuskuruni Jubo, and a super hat-trick against Jamalpur Kacharipara Akadas.

=== Bangladesh Police ===
She played for Bangladesh Police in the 2025–26 Bangladesh Women's Football League. She netted her debut goal for the club against Nasrin Sports Academy, ultimately finishing the match with five goals.

== International career ==
=== Youth ===
In 2023, Sagorika represented the Bangladesh U17 team in the 2023 SAFF U-17 Women's Championship and 2024 AFC U-17 Women's Asian Cup qualifiers. The following year, she received the Top Scorer and Most Valuable Player Award as Bangladesh U19 won the 2024 SAFF U-19 Women's Championship.

In the 2025 SAFF U-20 Women's Championship, she scored four goals in the last match against Nepal and helped her team clinch the championship.

She scored a brace in her debut match at the 2026 AFC U-20 Women's Asian Cup against Thailand.

=== Senior ===
On 24 July 2024, she debuted for Bangladesh in a friendly match against Bhutan in a 5–1 victory, scoring a hat-trick in the process. On 27 July, she scored another goal in the second friendly match, as her team defeated Bhutan 4–2.

Sagorika scored her first competitive tournament goal for the senior team in the 2026 SAFF Women's Championship in the semi-final against Nepal, netting a stoppage-time winner to send her team to the final.

== Career statistics ==
Scores and results list Bangladesh's goal tally first, score column indicates score after each Mst. Sagorika goal.

List of international goals scored by Mst. Sagorika
No.	Date	Venue	Opponent	Score	Result	Competition
1	24 July 2024	Changlimithang Stadium, Thimphu, Bhutan	Bhutan	1–1	5–1	Friendly
2	24 July 2024	Changlimithang Stadium, Thimphu, Bhutan	Bhutan	1–4	5–1	Friendly
3	24 July 2024	Changlimithang Stadium, Thimphu, Bhutan	Bhutan	1–5	5–1	Friendly
4	27 July 2024	Changlimithang Stadium, Thimphu, Bhutan	Bhutan	2–2	4–2	Friendly
5	3 June 2026	Jawaharlal Nehru Stadium, Margao, Goa, India	Nepal	2–1	2–1	2026 SAFF Women's Championship

== Honours ==
Bangladesh

- SAFF Women's Championship: 2024

Bangladesh U20

- SAFF U-20 Women's Championship: 2024, 2025

Individual

- SAFF U-20 Women's Championship Most Valuable Player: 2024, 2025
- SAFF U-20 Women's Championship Top Scorer: 2024
