= Sanjida =

Sanjida (Bengali: সানজিদা/সনজীদা, romanised: Sanjida/Sanjeeda) is a Bangladeshi feminine given name.

== Notable people ==
- Sanjida Islam (born 1996), Bangladeshi International cricketer
- Sanjida Khatun (born 1932), Bangladeshi musicologist
- Sanjida Akhter (born 2001), Bangladeshi footballer
