= 2025 SAFF U-20 Women's Championship =

Tournament details
- Host country: Bangladesh
- Dates: 11–21 July 2025
- Teams: 4 (from 1 sub-confederation)
- Venues: 2 (in Dhaka host cities)

Final positions
- Champions: Bangladesh (5th title)
- Runners-up: Nepal
- Third place: Bhutan
- Fourth place: Sri Lanka

Tournament statistics
- Matches played: 12
- Goals scored: 71 (5.92 per match)
- Attendance: 12,724 (1,060 per match)
- Top scorer(s): (Nepal) Purnima Rai (10 goals)
- Best player: (Bangladesh) Mosammat Sagorika
- Best goalkeeper: (Bangladesh) Mile Akter
- Fair play award: Sri Lanka

The 2025 SAFF U-20 Women's Championship was the sixth edition of the SAFF U-20 Women's Championship, an international football competition for women's under–20 national teams organized by the South Asian Football Federation (SAFF). The tournament was played from 11 to 21 July 2025 in Dhaka, Bangladesh.

Bangladesh won the title of the SAFF U–20 Women's Championship 2025 after finishing on the top table with Eighteen points and became the champions in this edition.

== Host selection ==
At the SAFF Executive Committee virtual meeting, held on 20 November 2024 in Dhaka, Bangladesh, SAFF announced that Bangladesh would host the tournament.

== Participating nations ==
The following four nations participated in the tournament.

Team	Appearances in the SAFF U-20 Women's Championship	Previous best performance
Bangladesh (Host)	5th	Champions (2018, 2021, 2023, 2024)
Bhutan	4th	Fourth-place (2018, 2023, 2024)
Nepal	5th	Runners-up (2018, 2023)
Sri Lanka	2nd	Group stage (2021)

== Venue ==
All matches were played at the Bashundhara Kings Arena and Bashundhara Sports Ground (Note: Due to poor conditions and a poor outfield, the ground was changed, and the match was held at the adjacent Bashundhara Sports Ground instead. Kings Arena was the main venue as per the schedule.) in Dhaka, Bangladesh.

Dhaka	Dhaka is located in Bangladesh
Bashundhara Kings Arena	Dhaka is located in Bangladesh
Capacity: 6,000	Dhaka is located in Bangladesh

== Draw and fixtures ==
The draw and fixtures were announced by the SAFF tournament committee on 12 June 2025 at 17:00 BST. The four nations played each other twice in the double round-robin league format.

== Squads ==
The following squads were announced ahead of the tournament.

Bangladesh (H)	Bhutan	Nepal	Sri Lanka
Swarna Rani Mandal; Mile Akter; MST Fardosi Akter Shonale; MST Joynob Bibi Rita; Afeida Khandaker (c); MST Surma Jannat; Kanom Akter; MST Ruma Akter; Kanon Rani Bahadur; Sapna Rani; MST Oeyshi Khatun; Ayonto Bala Mahato; Rupa Akter; MST Bonna Khatun; MOST Munki Akhter; Sinha Jahan Shikha; Shanti Mardi; Nadia Akter Juti; Nabiran Khatun; Sree Moti Trishna Rani; MST Sagorika; Umehla Marma; Puja Das; Head coach: (England) Peter Butler	Pema Yangzom; Tshendu Pelzom (c); Nima Seldon; Sonam Choden; Tshering Pelden; Moelam Choekey; Namsel Wangzom; Tshering Lhamo; Preya Ghalley; Sangay Wangmo; Kelden Wangmo; Diktsha Rai; Sonam Choden (GK); Sonam Yangchen; Chador Zangmo; Kelzang Wangmo; Jigme Tenzin Chodden; Tshering Lham; Kinley Yangdon; Choki Om; Chorten Zangmo; Pema Dekar; Sonam Choden; Head coach: (Bhutan) Tanka Maya Ghalley	Anisha Rai; Asmita Gurung; Barsha Oli; Birsana Chaudhary; Ganga Rokaya; Jhuma Bishwakarma; Kabita Gurung; Karun Budhathoki; Kusum Khatiwada; Lila Joshi; Manisha Sen; Maya Maske; Meena Deuba; Purnima Rai; Samiskhya Magar; Sarita Kumari Nath; Semihangma Limbu Pandhak; Senu Pariyar; Simran Rai; Sita Rokaya; Sujata Tamang; Sukriya Miya; Sushila KC; Head coach: (Nepal) Yam Prasad Gurung	Sanduni Sewmini (c); Oshadhi Vandana Bandara; Rashmi Kavisha Devindi; Ann Perera; Chasila Shehani Abeysingha; Shavinka Thushani; Thushanthan Sasmi; Dulini Sandeepani De Silva; Jasotharan Layansika; Hasheema Banu; Oshadhi Sewwandi; Sritharan Hamshiya; Indran Mashi Gregory; Idusha Madubashini; Irusha Madubashini; Tharushika Dilshani; Madushani Apsara; Gagani Gayathma; Thayaparan Kuvetha; Aathika Asfar; Methuki Thennakoon; Rumesha Sewmini; Sasidi Nimsara; Head coach: (Sri Lanka) Shirantha Kumara

== Match officials ==
Referees

- (Bangladesh) Jaya Chakma (†)
- (India) Rachana Hasmukh Kamani (†)
- (Bhutan) Tshering Yangkhey
- (Nepal) Anjana Rai (†)
- (Sri Lanka) Y.A. Pabasara Minisaraniyapa

Assistant Referees & Fourth Official

- (Bangladesh) Salma Akter Moni
- (India) Abhirami Thambilali
- (Nepal) Prem Kumari Sunwar
- (Nepal) Merina Dhimal
- (Sri Lanka) H.M. Malika Madhushani

Match commissioner & Referee Assessor

- (Bhutan) Tashi Dorji Wangmo
- (Sri Lanka) Mohamed Asif Mohamed Ansar
- (Nepal) Bina Nawachhe Shrestha

(†): Also performed as assistant referee in some matches.

== Round robin ==
Key to colours in group tables
Champion

Tiebreakers

Teams are ranked according to points (3 points for a win, 1 point for a draw, 0 points for a loss), and if tied on points, the following tie-breaking criteria are applied, in the order given, to determine the rankings.

1. Points in head-to-head matches among tied teams;
2. Goal difference in head-to-head matches among tied teams;
3. Goals scored in head-to-head matches among tied teams;
4. If more than two teams are tied, and after applying all head-to-head criteria above, a subset of teams are still tied, all head-to-head criteria above are reapplied exclusively to this subset of teams;
5. Goal difference in all group matches;
6. Goals scored in all group matches;
7. Penalty shoot-out if only two teams are tied and they met in the last round of the group;
8. Disciplinary points (yellow card = 1 point, red card as a result of two yellow cards = 3 points, direct red card = 3 points, yellow card followed by direct red card = 4 points);
9. Drawing of lots.

=== Standings ===
Pos	Team	Pld	W	D	L	GF	GA	GD	Pts	Status
1	Bangladesh (H)	6	6	0	0	28	4	+24	18	Champions
2	Nepal	6	4	0	2	30	8	+22	12	
3	Bhutan	6	2	0	4	12	21	−9	6	
4	Sri Lanka	6	0	0	6	1	38	−37	0	

Source: SAFF
Rules for classification: (1) points; (2) head-to-head points; (3) head-to-head goal difference; (4) goal difference; (5) number of goals scored;
(H) Hosts

=== Matches ===
11 July 2025
15:00

Bangladesh	9–1	Sri Lanka
Sapna 2'; Munki Akhter 4', 47'; Sagorika 38', 52', 57'; Sinha Jahan Sikha 48'; Rupa Akter 84'; Shanti Mardi 90+3'	Report	Jasotharan Layansika 90+1'

Bashundhara Kings Arena, Dhaka
Attendance: 1,000
Referee: Anjana Rai (Nepal)
11 July 2025
19:00

Bhutan	1–6	Nepal
Kelden Wangmo 54'	Report	Senu Pariyar 9', 18'; Purnima Rai 18', 63', 84', 88'

Bashundhara Kings Arena, Dhaka
Attendance: 2,180
Referee: Y.A. Pabasara Minisaraniyapa (Sri Lanka)

13 July 2025
15:00

Sri Lanka	0–5	Bhutan
	Report	Kelden Wangmo 2', 15'; Namsel Wangzom 24'; Sangay Wangmo 79', 87'

Bashundhara Kings Arena, Dhaka
Attendance: 1,020
Referee: Jaya Chakma (Bangladesh)
13 July 2025
19:00

Nepal	2–3	Bangladesh
Anisha Rai 78' (pen.); Meena Deuba 87'	Report	Sinha Jahan Sikha 14'; Sagorika 37'; Sree Moti Trishna Rani 90+7'

Bashundhara Kings Arena, Dhaka
Attendance: 3,150
Referee: Tshering Yangkhey (Bhutan)

15 July 2025
15:00

Bangladesh	4–1 (Note: The match was temporarily suspended due to poor outfield.)	Bhutan
Shanti Mardi 7', 57', 79'; Munki Akhter 76'	Report	Sangay Wangmo 53'

Bashundhara Kings Arena/Sports Ground, Dhaka (Note: The field was changed after halftime due to poor conditions and a poor outfield. The post-match sessions were held at the adjacent Bashundhara Sports Ground.)
Attendance: 0
Referee: Anjana Rai (Nepal)
15 July 2025
20:45 (Note: The match was postponed and postponed from 19:00 due to poor field conditions due to incessant rain at the Kings Arena. The match is being held at Bashundhara Sports Ground at 20:45.)

Sri Lanka	0–7	Nepal
	Report	Meena Deuba 8', 42', 70'; Sushila KC 13'; Purnima Rai 45+2', 45+4'; Sarita Nath 90+1'

Bashundhara Sports Ground, Dhaka
Attendance: 0
Referee: Rachana Hasmukh Kamani (India)

17 July 2025
15:00

Nepal	7–0	Sri Lanka
Purnima Rai 16'; Kusum Khatiwada 35', 44'; Sarita Kumari Nath 42'; Birsana Chaudhary 67' (pen.); Samikshya Magar 74', 78'	Report

Bashundhara Sports Ground, Dhaka
Attendance: 0
Referee: Jaya Chakma (Bangladesh)
17 July 2025
19:00

Bhutan	0–3	Bangladesh
	Report	Sree Moti Trishna Rani 33', 66'; Sapna 75'

Bashundhara Sports Ground, Dhaka
Attendance: 0
Referee: Y.A. Pabasara Minisaraniyapa (Sri Lanka)

19 July 2025
15:00

Nepal	8–0	Bhutan
Meena Deuba 1', 12', 65'; Samikshya Magar 9'; Purnima Rai 23', 45+1', 45+6'; Kusum Khatiwada 63'	Report

Bashundhara Sports Ground, Dhaka
Attendance: 0
Referee: Rachana Hasmukh Kamani (India)
19 July 2025
19:00

Sri Lanka	0–5	Bangladesh
	Report	Kanon Bahadur 26'; Puja Das 45+2', 74'; Sree Moti Trishna Rani 86'; Afeida 90+7'

Bashundhara Sports Ground, Dhaka
Attendance: 0
Referee: Tshering Yangkhey (Bhutan)

21 July 2025
15:00

Bhutan	5–0	Sri Lanka
Preya Ghalley 41', 59', 64'; Sangay Wangmo 73'; Namsel Wangzom 81'	Report

Bashundhara Kings Arena, Dhaka
Attendance: 0
Referee: Anjana Rai (Nepal)
21 July 2025
19:00

Bangladesh	4–0	Nepal
Sagorika 8', 52', 58', 72'	Report

Bashundhara Kings Arena, Dhaka
Attendance: 5,374
Referee: Rachana Hasmukh Kamani (India)

== Winners ==
2025 SAFF U-20 Women's Championship Champions

Bangladesh
Fifth title

== Awards ==
The following awards were given at the conclusion of the tournament:

Most Valuable Player	Top Goalscorers	Best goalkeeper	Fair play award	Ref
(Bangladesh) Mosammat Sagorika	(Nepal) Purnima Rai	(Bangladesh) Mile Akter	Sri Lanka	

== Statistics ==
=== Goalscorers ===
There have been 71 goals scored in 12 matches, for an average of 5.92 goals per match.

10 goals

- (Nepal) Purnima Rai

8 goals

- (Bangladesh) Mosammat Sagorika

7 goals

- (Nepal) Meena Deuba

4 goals

- (Bangladesh) Shanti Mardi
- (Bangladesh) Sree Moti Trishna Rani

3 goals

- (Bhutan) Preya Ghalley
- (Bhutan) Sangay Wangmo
- (Bhutan) Kelden Wangmo
- (Bangladesh) Munki Akhter
- (Nepal) Kusum Khatiwada
- (Nepal) Samikshya Magar

2 goals

- (Bhutan) Namsel Wangzom
- (Bangladesh) Sapna Rani
- (Bangladesh) Sinha Jahan Sikha
- (Bangladesh) Puja Das
- (Nepal) Senu Pariyar
- (Nepal) Sarita Kumari

1 goal

- (Bangladesh) Rupa Akter
- (Bangladesh) Kanon Bahadur
- (Bangladesh) Afeida Khandaker
- (Nepal) Anisha Rai
- (Nepal) Birsana Chaudhary
- (Sri Lanka) Jasotharan Layansika

Source: GSA

=== Hat trick ===
Player	Against	Result	Date	Ref
(Bangladesh) Mosammat Sagorika	Sri Lanka	9–1	11 July 2025	
(Nepal) Purnima Rai	Bhutan	6–1	11 July 2025	
(Bangladesh) Shanti Mardi	Bhutan	4–1	15 July 2025	
(Nepal) Meena Deuba	Sri Lanka	7–0	15 July 2025	
(Nepal) Purnima Rai	Bhutan	8–0	19 July 2025	
(Nepal) Meena Deuba	Bhutan	8–0	19 July 2025	
(Bangladesh) Mosammat Sagorika	Nepal	4–0	21 July 2025	

== Broadcasting ==
Territory	Broadcaster(s)	Reference
No restricted territory	Sportzworkz^{(YouTube Channel)}	2025 SAFF U-20 Women's matches playlist on YouTube
Bangladesh	T Sports^{(T Sports YouTube)}	2025 SAFF U-20 Women's matches playlist on YouTube

== See also ==
- 2025–26 AFC Women's Champions League
- 2025 SAFF U-17 Women's Championship
- 2025 SAFF U-20 Women's Championship
