= 2019 Bangamata U-19 Women's Gold Cup =

2019 Bangamata U–19 Women's Gold Cup

Tournament details
- Host country: Bangladesh
- Dates: 22 April – 3 May 2019
- Teams: 6 (from 6 AFC nations)
- Venue: 1 (in 1 host city)

Final positions
- Champions: Bangladesh (Joint winners); Laos (Joint winners) (1st title)
- Runners-up: None

Tournament statistics
- Matches played: 8
- Goals scored: 33 (4.13 per match)
- Attendance: 34,592 (4,324 per match)
- Top scorer: (Laos) Ms Pe Phomphakdy (8 goals)
- Best player: (Bangladesh) Sanjida Akhter
- Best goalkeeper: (Bangladesh) Mahmuda Akter

The 2019 Bangamata U–19 Women's Gold Cup was the 1st edition of Bangamata U-19 Women's International Gold Cup, an annual international women's youth football tournament hosted by Bangladesh Football Federation.The main goal of this tournament to make strong pipeline of Bangladesh women's national football team in future. After the 4th edition of this tournament it will be National women's team tournament instead of Bangladesh women's national under-20 football team.

== Draw ==
The draw was held at the Hotel Pan Pacific Sonargaon in Dhaka on 12 March 2019.The six teams were divided into two groups. The top two teams from each group qualified for the semi-finals.

| Group A | Group B |
|---|---|
| Laos; Mongolia; Tajikistan | Bangladesh; Kyrgyzstan; United Arab Emirates |

== Venue ==
Dhaka
Bangabandhu National Stadium
Capacity: 36,000
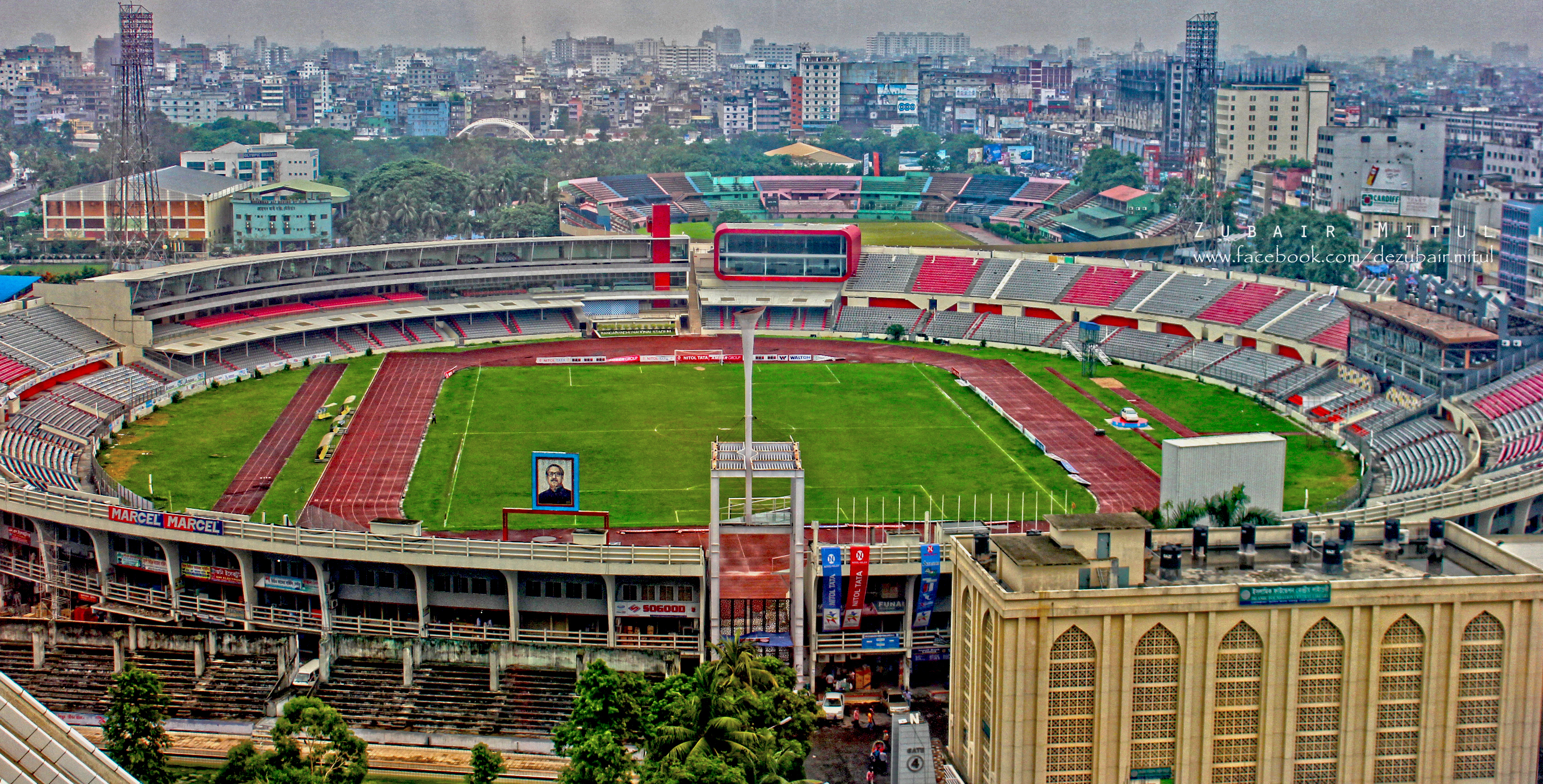

== Prize money ==
- Champion got US$25,000.
- Runners-up got US$15,000.

== Participating teams ==
- Bangladesh (Host)
- Kyrgyzstan
- Laos
- Mongolia
- Tajikistan
- United Arab Emirates

== Group stage ==
- Times listed are UTC+6:00.

=== Group A ===
| Pos | Team | Pld | W | D | L | GF | GA | GD | Pts | Qualification |
|---|---|---|---|---|---|---|---|---|---|---|
| 1 | Laos | 2 | 2 | 0 | 0 | 11 | 0 | +11 | 6 | Advance to Semi-Finals |
| 2 | Mongolia | 2 | 1 | 0 | 1 | 3 | 5 | −2 | 3 | Advance to Semi-Finals |
| 3 | Tajikistan | 2 | 0 | 0 | 2 | 0 | 9 | −9 | 0 | |

Source: BFF
23 April 2019
18:00 BST

| Tajikistan | 0–3 | Mongolia |
|---|---|---|
| | Report | Tuvshinjargal 13'; Enkhbaatar 28'; Nyamsuren 69' |

Bangabandhu National Stadium, Dhaka
Attendance: 4,316
Referee: Mizanur Rahman (Bangladesh)

25 April 2019
18:00 BST

| Mongolia | 0–5 | Laos |
|---|---|---|
| | Report | Phomphakdy 2', 50'; Aphatsala 13', 32'; Saysamone 82' |

Bangabandhu National Stadium, Dhaka
Attendance: 1,329
Referee: Mahmood Al-Majarafi (Oman)

27 April 2019
20:30 BST

| Laos | 6–0 | Tajikistan |
|---|---|---|
| Phomphakdy 4', 37'; Chanthithong 25' (pen.); Inthaphone 75', 90'; Fayzulloeva 90+4' (o.g.) | Report |

Bangabandhu National Stadium, Dhaka
Attendance: 1,942
Referee: Zaid Thamer Mohammed (Iraq)

=== Group B ===
| Pos | Team | Pld | W | D | L | GF | GA | GD | Pts | Qualification |
|---|---|---|---|---|---|---|---|---|---|---|
| 1 | Bangladesh | 2 | 2 | 0 | 0 | 4 | 1 | +3 | 6 | Advance to Semi-Finals |
| 2 | Kyrgyzstan | 2 | 1 | 0 | 1 | 3 | 3 | 0 | 3 | Advance to Semi-Finals |
| 3 | United Arab Emirates | 2 | 0 | 0 | 2 | 1 | 4 | −3 | 0 | |

Source: BFF
22 April 2019
18:00 BST

| Bangladesh | 2–0 | United Arab Emirates |
|---|---|---|
| Shopna 12'; Krishna 30' | Report |

Bangabandhu National Stadium, Dhaka
Attendance: 9,414
Referee: Abdel Aqel (Jordan)

24 April 2019
18:00 BST

| United Arab Emirates | 1–2 | Kyrgyzstan |
|---|---|---|
| al-Zarkan 39' | Report | Boronbekova 6'; Yrysbek Kyzy 18' |

Bangabandhu National Stadium, Dhaka
Attendance: 1,671
Referee: I. Alam (Bangladesh)

26 April 2019
18:00 BST

| Bangladesh | 2–1 | Kyrgyzstan |
|---|---|---|
| Akhter 1'; Krishna 59' | Report | Akhmatkulova 69' |

Bangabandhu National Stadium, Dhaka
Attendance: 4,220
Referee: Shen Yinhao (China)

== Knockout stage ==
- Time Listed are UTC+6:00
- All matches were held at Dhaka
- In the knockout stage, extra time and penalty shoot-out are used to decide the winner if necessary.

=== Bracket ===
Semi-Finals
29 April – Dhaka
Laos | 7
Kyrgyzstan | 1
30 April – Dhaka
Bangladesh | 3
Mongolia | 0

Final
3 May – Dhaka
Laos | n.p.
Bangladesh | n.p.

=== Semi-finals ===
29 April 2019
18:00 BST

| Laos | 7–1 | Kyrgyzstan |
|---|---|---|
| Phomphakdy 9', 21', 86', 89' (pen.); Sisaketh 74'; Inthiya 57'; Vongsingkham 90+2' | Report | Askarova 43' |

Bangabandhu National Stadium, Dhaka
Attendance: 2,300
Referee: Sarkar Asit Kumar (India)

30 April 2019
18:00 BST

| Bangladesh | 3–0 | Mongolia |
|---|---|---|
| Monika 45+1'; Akter 69'; Tohura 85' | Report |

Bangabandhu National Stadium, Dhaka
Attendance: 6,408
Referee: Aung Moe (Myanmar)

=== Final ===
3 May 2019
18:00 BST

| Laos | Cancelled (Note: The final match was cancelled due to unplayable conditions caused by Cyclonic Storm Fani, with both finalists declared joint champions.) | Bangladesh |
|---|---|---|
| | Report |

Bangabandhu National Stadium, Dhaka
Attendance: 9,400
Referee: Rawut Nakarit (Thailand)

== Goalscorers ==
There were 33 goals scored in 8 matches, for an average of 4.12 goals per match.

8 goals

- (Laos) Ms Pe Phomphakdy

3 goals

- (Laos) Saysamone Inthaphone

2 goals

- (Bangladesh) Krishna Rani Sarkar
- (Laos) Aphatsala Chanthavongxay

1 goal

- (Bangladesh) Sanjida Akhter
- (Bangladesh) Marzia Akter
- (Bangladesh) Monika Chakma
- (Bangladesh) Tohura Khatun
- (Bangladesh) Sirat Jahan Shopna
- (Kyrgyzstan) Zairina Akhmatkulova
- (Kyrgyzstan) Aiturgan Askarova
- (Kyrgyzstan) Aizhan Boronbekova
- (Kyrgyzstan) Kenzhebubu Yrysbek Kyzy
- (Laos) Anouta Chanthithong
- (Laos) Monthip Inthiya
- (Laos) Vady Sisaketh
- (Laos) Larnoy Vongsingkham
- (Mongolia) Enkhbaatar Enkhmargad
- (Mongolia) Nyamsuren Delgorzaya
- (Mongolia) Tuvshinjargal Undral
- (United Arab Emirates) Shahd Al-Zarkan

1 own goal

- (Tajikistan) Marjona Fayzulloeva (against Laos)

== Broadcaster ==
| Territory | Television |
|---|---|
| Bangladesh | RTV |

== Sponsorship ==
Local sports marketing company K-Sports bought the rights for the tournament.

Co-sponsored by

- United Commercial Bank Limited
- Dhaka Bank Limited
- Biman Bangladesh Airlines
- Haa-Meem Group
- Intraco Group
- Bangladesh Tourism Board
- Nagorik Tv
- Radio Bhumi
- Radio Foorti
- Unicef Bangladesh
- Intercontinental Dhaka
