= Sirat Jahan Shopna =

Bangladeshi footballer

Personal information
- Full name: Mosammat Sirat Jahan Shopna
- Date of birth: 10 April 2001 (age 25)
- Place of birth: Rangpur, Bangladesh
- Position: Forward

Youth career
- Palichara Primary Government School

Senior career*
Years	Team	Apps	(Gls)
2020–2022	Bashundhara Kings	18	(25)

International career^{‡}
2018–2019	Bangladesh U-20	9	(9)
2014–2022	Bangladesh	25	(10)
2018	Bangladesh futsal	3	(0)
Medal record
Women's football
Representing Bangladesh
SAFF Women's Championship
Winner	2022 Nepal
Runner-up	2016 India
South Asian Games
Bronze medal – third place	2016 India
SAFF U-20 Women's Championship
Winner	2018 Bhutan
Bangamata U-19 Women's International Gold Cup
Winner	2019 Bangladesh
- * Club domestic league appearances and goals as of 31 December 2022 ‡ National team caps and goals as of 19 September 2022

Mosammat Sirat Jahan Shopna (Bengali: মোসাম্মত সিরাত জাহান স্বপ্না, Bengali pronunciation: [mosamːɔt sirat dʒaɦan ʃɔpna]; born 10 April 2001) is a Bangladeshi former professional footballer who played as a forward for Bashundhara Kings and the Bangladesh national team.

She has also played for the Bangladesh national futsal team.

== Early career ==
She played for Palichara Primary Government School, located in Rangpur.

== International career ==
Shopna scored for Bangladesh in the 40th minute in the final of the 2016 SAFF Women's Championship.

== International goals ==
Scores and result list Bangladesh's goal tally first.

No.	Date	Venue	Opponent	Score	Result	Competition
1	29 December 2016	Kanchenjunga Stadium, Siliguri, India	Afghanistan	6–0	6–0	2016 SAFF Women's Championship
2	2 January 2017	Kanchenjunga Stadium, Siliguri, India	Maldives	1–0	6–0	2016 SAFF Women's Championship
3	2 January 2017	Kanchenjunga Stadium, Siliguri, India	Maldives	2–0	6–0	2016 SAFF Women's Championship
4	2 January 2017	Kanchenjunga Stadium, Siliguri, India	Maldives	5–0	6–0	2016 SAFF Women's Championship
5	4 January 2017	Kanchenjunga Stadium, Siliguri, India	India	1–1	1–3	2016 SAFF Women's Championship
6	23 June 2022	BSSS Mostafa Kamal Stadium, Dhaka, Bangladesh	Malaysia	4–0	6–0	Friendly Match
7	10 September 2022	Dashrath Rangasala, Kathmandu, Nepal	Pakistan	2–0	6–0	2022 SAFF Women's Championship
8	13 September 2022	Dashrath Rangasala, Kathmandu, Nepal	India	1–0	3–0	2022 SAFF Women's Championship
9	13 September 2022	Dashrath Rangasala, Kathmandu, Nepal	India	3–0	3–0	2022 SAFF Women's Championship
10	16 September 2022	Dashrath Rangasala, Kathmandu, Nepal	Bhutan	1–0	8–0	2022 SAFF Women's Championship

== Honours ==
=== Club ===
Bashundhara Kings Women

- Bangladesh Women's Football League
  - Winners (3): 2019–20, 2020–21, 2021–22

=== International ===
- SAFF Women's Championship

Winner : 2022
Runner-up : 2016

- South Asian Games

Bronze : 2016

- SAFF U-20 Women's Championship

Champion (1): 2018

- Bangamata U-19 Women's International Gold Cup

Champion trophy shared (1): 2019

- AFC U-14 Girls' Regional C'ship – South and Central

Bangladesh U-14 Girls'
Champion : 2015
