= 2011 AFC U-19 Women's Championship qualification =

Tournament details
- Dates: 20 September – 30 October 2010
- Teams: 10 (from 1 confederation)

This article include details of 2011 AFC U-19 Women's Championship qualification.

Qualifiers were held from 20 September to 30 October 2010 and comprised two rounds.

== First round ==
Each group winner will advance to the Second round.

=== Group A ===
All matches were held in Makati, Philippines (UTC+8).

Team	Pld	W	D	L	GF	GA	GD	Pts
Uzbekistan	2	2	0	0	5	0	+5	6
Myanmar	2	1	0	1	5	1	+4	3
Philippines	2	0	0	2	0	9	−9	0

- Note: Hong Kong withdrew before playing any matches.
20 September 2010
15:30

Myanmar	0–1	Uzbekistan
	Report	Gugueva 20'

UMAK Stadium, Makati
Attendance: 1,000
Referee: Praew Semaksuk (Thailand)

22 September 2010
15:00

Philippines	0–5	Myanmar
	Report	Wai Aung 25'; Yin Win 74', 88'; Ray Zar 80', 84'

UMAK Stadium, Makati
Attendance: 1,500
Referee: Fukano Etsuko (Japan)

24 September 2010
15:00

Philippines	0–4	Uzbekistan
	Report	Karachik 26'; Bakhromova 53'; Safina 56'; Turdiboeva 68'

UMAK Stadium, Makati
Attendance: 1,500
Referee: Mai Hoang Trang (Vietnam)

=== Group B ===
All matches were held in Dhaka, Bangladesh (UTC+6).

Team	Pld	W	D	L	GF	GA	GD	Pts
Iran	3	3	0	0	13	4	+9	9
India	3	2	0	1	10	4	+6	6
Jordan	3	1	0	2	8	6	+2	3
Bangladesh	3	0	0	3	1	18	−17	0

20 September 2010
15:30

India	2–4	Iran
Elangbam 25'; Salam Rinaroy Devi 52'	Report	Parvin 18', 29', 70'; Bahrami 59'

Birshrestha Sipahi Mohammad Mostafa Stadium, Dhaka
Attendance: 5,000
Referee: Rita Gani (Malaysia)
20 September 2010
19:00

Bangladesh	1–6	Jordan
Khatun 8'	Report	Al-Majali 34' (pen.); Jebreen 37', 64', 90+2'; Assahwneh 75'; Abu-Khashabeh 87'

Birshrestha Sipahi Mohammad Mostafa Stadium, Dhaka
Attendance: 10,000
Referee: Sato Nami (Japan)

22 September 2010
15:30

Jordan	0–2	India
	Report	Salam 18'; Soren 25'

Birshrestha Sipahi Mohammad Mostafa Stadium, Dhaka
Attendance: 4,000
Referee: Ri Hyang-Ok (Korea DPR)
22 September 2010
19:00

Iran	6–0	Bangladesh
Naraghi 44', 60', 73'; Ghanbari 47' (pen.), 86'; Parvin 50'	Report

Birshrestha Sipahi Mohammad Mostafa Stadium, Dhaka
Attendance: 15,000
Referee: Kim Sook-Hee (Korea Republic)

24 September 2010
15:30

Jordan	2–3	Iran
Jebreen 15', 24'	Report	Sarbali Alishah 36'; Samaneh 85'; Karimi 89'

Birshrestha Sipahi Mohammad Mostafa Stadium, Dhaka
Attendance: 5,000
Referee: Sato Nami (Japan)
24 September 2010
19:00

India	6–0	Bangladesh
Elangbam 39'; Salam 53', 73', 75', 78'; Bhutia 86'	Report

Birshrestha Sipahi Mohammad Mostafa Stadium, Dhaka
Attendance: 18,000
Referee: Rita Gani (Malaysia)

== Second round ==
All matches were held Kuala Lumpur, Malaysia (UTC+8).

Team	Pld	W	D	L	GF	GA	GD	Pts
Vietnam	4	3	1	0	8	1	+7	10
Thailand	4	2	2	0	13	2	+11	8
Chinese Taipei	4	2	0	2	8	8	0	6
Uzbekistan	4	1	1	2	8	9	−1	4
Iran	4	0	0	4	3	20	−17	0

21 October 2010
15:00

Chinese Taipei	0–2	Thailand
	Report	Dangda 7'; Feng Meng-ping 24' (o.g.)

National Stadium, Kuala Lumpur
Attendance: 70
Referee: Fukano Etsuko (Japan)
21 October 2010
18:30

Iran	1–5	Uzbekistan
Rahimi 62'	Report	Riskieva 19', 74'; Gugueva 33'; Bakhromova 77'; Karachik 89'

National Stadium, Kuala Lumpur
Attendance: 100
Referee: Ri Hong-Sil (Korea DPR)

23 October 2010
15:00

Uzbekistan	0–3	Vietnam
	Report	Phạm Hải Yến 68', 88'; Nguyễn Thị Nguyệt 90'

National Stadium, Kuala Lumpur
Attendance: 100
Referee: Kim Sook-Hee (Korea Republic)
23 October 2010
18:30

Iran	2–4	Chinese Taipei
Ahmadi 71'; Samaneh 90+2'	Report	Liu Chien-yun 3'; Chen Li-wen 44', 73'; Yang Ching 90+1'

National Stadium, Kuala Lumpur
Attendance: 80
Referee: Fukano Etsuko (Japan)

25 October 2010
15:00

Vietnam	2–0	Iran
Nguyễn Thị Liễu 8'; Nguyễn Thị Tuyết Dung 36'	Report

National Stadium, Kuala Lumpur
Attendance: 100
Referee: Kim Sook-Hee (Korea Republic)
25 October 2010
18:30

Thailand	2–2	Uzbekistan
Dangda 28'; Thaoto 63'	Report	Turdiboeva 45'; Gugueva 66'

National Stadium, Kuala Lumpur
Attendance: 120
Referee: Ri Hong-Sil (Korea DPR)

28 October 2010
15:00

Thailand	9–0	Iran
Thaoto 14', 18', 25', 34', 52'; Dangda 28', 66', 72'; Tanasan 90+1'	Report

National Stadium, Kuala Lumpur
Attendance: 100
Referee: Kim Sook-Hee (Korea Republic)
28 October 2010
18:30

Chinese Taipei	1–3	Vietnam
Chang Shu-chin 25' (pen.)	Report	Nguyễn Thị Nguyệt 16', 56', 48' (pen.)

National Stadium, Kuala Lumpur
Attendance: 110
Referee: Fukano Etsuko (Japan)

30 October 2010
15:00

Uzbekistan	1–3	Chinese Taipei
Turdiboeva 57' (pen.)	Report	Chiang Ya-hui 5'; Lee Hsiu-chin 56', 64'

National Stadium, Kuala Lumpur
Attendance: 100
Referee: Ri Hong-Sil (Korea DPR)
30 October 2010
18:30

Vietnam	0–0	Thailand
	Report

National Stadium, Kuala Lumpur
Attendance: 100
Referee: Fukano Etsuko (Japan)
