= Sanjida Akhter =

Bangladeshi women's football player

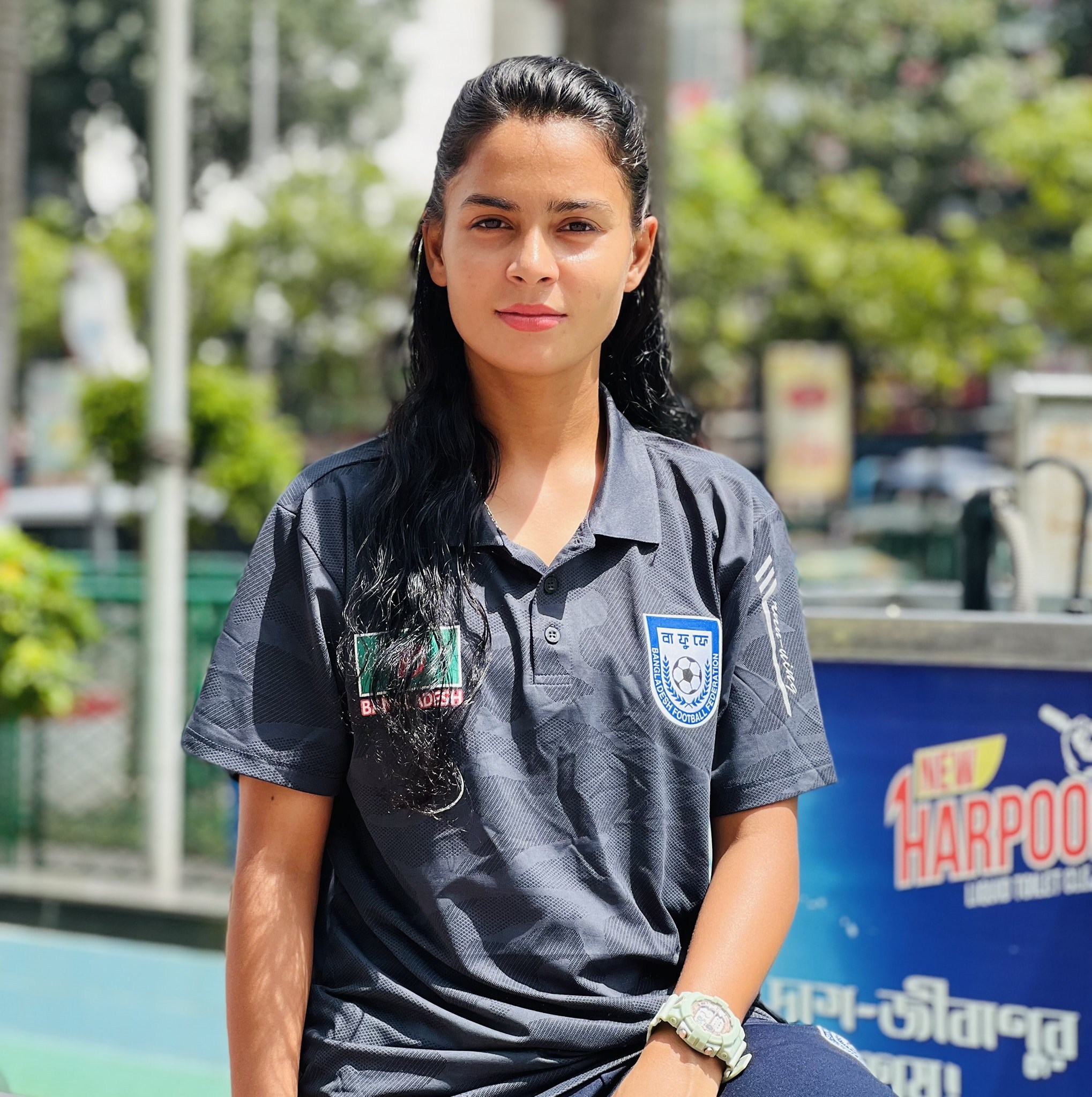
- Akhter in 2022

Personal information
- Full name: Sanjida Akhter
- Date of birth: March 20, 2001 (age 25)
- Place of birth: Mymensingh
- Height: 1.60 m (5 ft 3 in)
- Positions: Right winger; attacking midfielder

Youth career
- 2011–2013: Kalsindur Government Primary School

Senior career*
Years	Team	Apps	(Gls)
2020–2023	Bashundhara Kings	29	(12)
2023–2024	Nasrin	8	(5)
2024	East Bengal	6	(1)
2025	Thimphu City	2	(2)
2025	Nasrin	0	(0)
2025–2026	Bangladesh Police	10	(7)
2026	Jhapa	0	(0)
2026	Techvill (futsal)		

International career^{‡}
2013–2015	Bangladesh U-14	4	(4)
2014–2017	Bangladesh U17	9	(4)
2018–2019	Bangladesh U20	9	(2)
2016–	Bangladesh	31	(1)
2018	Bangladesh futsal	3	(0)
Medal record
Women's football
Representing Bangladesh
SAFF Women's Championship
Winner	2022 Nepal	,
Winner	2024 Nepal
Runner-up	2016 India
South Asian Games
Bronze medal – third place	2016 India
SAFF U-20 Women's Championship
Winner	2018 Bhutan
Bangamata U-19 Women's International Gold Cup
Winner	2019 Bangladesh
AFC U-14 Girls' Regional C'ship – South and Central
Winner	2015 Bangladesh	Bangladesh U14
- * Club domestic league appearances and goals as of 24 May 2026 ‡ National team caps and goals as of 24 May 2026

Sanjida Akhter (Bengali: সানজিদা আক্তার; born 20 March 2001) is a Bangladeshi professional footballer who plays as a midfielder for the Bangladesh national team.

Besides, she has also played for the Bangladesh women's futsal team.

== Early years and education ==
Sanjida Akter was born on 20 March 2001 in Kalsindur, Dhobaura, Mymensingh district.

She is currently an undergraduate student of American International University-Bangladesh.

== Early career ==
Sanjida first played in the 2011 Bangamata Sheikh Fazilatunnesa Mujib Gold Cup Football Tournament for Kalsindur Government Primary School.

== Club career ==
=== Bashundhara Kings ===
Sanjida joined Bangladesh Women's Football league team Bashundhara Kings in 2019 and made appearances for the club as their starting midfielder during the 2019-20 Bangladesh Women's Football League season.

=== East Bengal ===
In 2024, she joined the Indian Women's League club East Bengal for the season.

=== Thimphu City ===
In 2025, she signed with Bhutan Women's National League club Thimphu City. She scored two goals in two matches for the club.

=== Nasrin ===
She played for Nasrin for 2025 SAFF Women's Club Championship. Her team consisted largely of age-level players, with her as the sole experienced campaigner, resulting in her team finishing bottom of the table with two draws and two defeats, without registering a win.

=== Bangladesh Police ===
In 2025, she signed with Bangladesh Police for the 2025–26 Bangladesh Women's Football League and led the team.

=== Jhapa ===
In March 2026, she joined Jhapa for the 2025–26 ANFA Women's League. She became the first Bangladeshi woman footballer to be recruited to play in Nepal's top-tier league. However, the league was suspended indefinitely on 19 March 2026, following concerns over foreign players participating on tourist visas without the required work permits.

=== Techvill ===
She joined Techvill to compete in the inaugural 2025–26 Women's Futsal League Bangladesh. Techvill finished third in the edition, recording eight wins and two defeats in 10 matches.

== International career ==
Sanjida was selected to the Bangladesh girls' U-17 team for the 2015 AFC U-16 Women's Championship qualification – Group B matches in 2014. She also played AFC U-14 Girls' Regional Championship – South and Central held in Nepal in 2015, where Bangladesh U-14 Girls' became Champion. She played in 2017 AFC U-16 Women's Championship qualification – Group C matches. She capped 9 times for the U-17 nationals and scored 4 goals. Being group C champion, Bangladesh have qualified for the 2017 AFC U-16 Women's Championship in Thailand in September 2017.

She later played in 2019 AFC U-19 Women's Championship qualification and the 2020 AFC Women's Olympic Qualifying Tournament.

== International goals ==
No.	Date	Venue	Opponent	Score	Result	Competition
1	4 December 2023	BSSSMK Stadium, Dhaka, Bangladesh	Singapore	4–0	8–0	Friendly

== Honours ==
=== Club ===
Bashundhara Kings Women

- Bangladesh Women's Football League
  - Winners (2): 2019–20, 2020–21

=== International ===
- SAFF Women's Championship

Winner : 2022, 2024
Runner-up : 2016

- South Asian Games

Bronze : 2016

- SAFF U-20 Women's Championship

Champion (1): 2018

- Bangamata U-19 Women's International Gold Cup

Champion trophy shared (1): 2019 She was the best player in the tournament.

- AFC U-14 Girls' Regional C'ship – South and Central

Bangladesh U-14 Girls'
Champion : 2015
