= Maysam Abu-Khashabeh =

Jordanian footballer

Maysam Abu-Khashabeh ميسم أبو خشبة (Arabic)
Personal information
- Full name: Maysam Muhsen Saeed Abu-Khashabeh
- Date of birth: 18 May 1993 (age 33)
- Place of birth: Amman, Jordan
- Position: Forward

International career^{‡}
| Years | Team | Apps | (Gls) |
| 2010 | Jordan U19 | 1+ | (1) |
| 2013 | Jordan | 1 | (0) |
- ‡ National team caps and goals as of 18 May 2014

Maysam Muhsen Saeed Abu-Khashabeh (Arabic: ميسم محسن سعيد أبو خشبة; born 18 May 1993) is a Jordanian footballer who plays as a forward. She has been a member of the Jordan women's national team.

== International career ==
Abu-Khashabeh capped for Jordan at senior level during the 2014 AFC Women's Asian Cup qualification.

== Personal life ==
Abu-Khashabeh is Muslim.
