= Bhutan women's national under-20 football team =

Youth association football team

Bhutan Women's U-20
- Association: Bhutan Football Federation
- Confederation: AFC (Asia)
- Sub-confederation: SAFF (South Asia)
- Head coach: Tanka Maya Ghalley
- Captain: Kelzang Tshering Wangmo
- FIFA code: BHU
First colours	Second colours

First international
- India 4–0 Bhutan (Thimphu, Bhutan; 28 September 2018)

Biggest win
- Bhutan 13–0 Maldives (Thimphu, Bhutan; 30 September 2018)

Biggest defeat
- India 12–0 Bhutan (Dhaka, Bangladesh; 3 February 2023); Bangladesh 12–0 Bhutan (Pokhara, Nepal; 31 January 2026)

FIFA U-20 Women's World Cup
- Appearances: 0

AFC U-20 Women's Asian Cup
- Appearances: 0

SAFF U-20 Women's Championship
- Appearances: 6 (first in 2018)
- Best result: Third place (2025)

The Bhutan women's national under-20 football team is the national under-20 team of Bhutan that represents the Bhutan in international football competitions including the SAFF U-20 Women's Championship, the AFC U-20 Women's Asian Cup and the FIFA U-20 Women's World Cup, as well as any other under-20 international football tournaments. The team is governed by the Bhutan Football Federation and is a member of the Asian Football Confederation (AFC). The youth side play their home games at Changlimithang Stadium in Thimphu alongside the senior team.

== Home stadium ==
The Bhutan women's national under-20 football team plays their home matches on the Changlimithang Stadium.

== Players ==
- The following players were called up for 2021 SAFF U-19 Women's Championship.

No.	Pos.	Player	Date of birth (age)	Club
1	GK	Dechen Wangmo	8 March 2004 (age 22)	(Bhutan Football Federation)
2	DF	Karma Wangmo	1 April 2003 (age 23)	(Bhutan Football Federation)
3	DF	Kelden Lhamo	28 September 2003 (age 23)	(Bhutan Football Federation)
4	DF	Rigzin Wangmo	28 October 2003 (age 23)	(Bhutan Football Federation)
5	DF	Pema Choki Lhamo	8 July 2003 (age 23)	(Bhutan Football Federation)
6	MF	Karma Zangmo	20 September 2004 (age 22)	(Bhutan Football Federation)
7	DF	Kezang Wangmo	20 September 2004 (age 22)	(Bhutan Football Federation)
8	MF	Deki Yangdon	9 February 2004 (age 22)	(Bhutan Football Federation)
9	MF	Tshering Lhaden	2 December 2003 (age 22)	(Bhutan Football Federation)
10	FW	Sonam Lhamo	29 May 2004 (age 22)	(Bhutan Football Federation)
11	MF	Yeshey Bidha	27 March 2004 (age 22)	(Bhutan Football Federation)
13	MF	Tandin Zangmo	22 February 2003 (age 23)	(Bhutan Football Federation)
14	MF	Pema Yangzom	2 August 2004 (age 22)	(Bhutan Football Federation)
15	GK	Karma Yuden	2 November 2004 (age 22)	(Bhutan Football Federation)
16	MF	Choney Zangmo	10 July 2004 (age 22)	(Bhutan Football Federation)
17	MF	Sonam Tshomo (Captain)	12 March 2004 (age 22)	(Bhutan Football Federation)
18	MF	Tshering Choden	17 June 2004 (age 22)	(Bhutan Football Federation)
19	MF	Sangay Dema	7 February 2004 (age 22)	(Bhutan Football Federation)
20	MF	Sherab Pelmo	26 July 2004 (age 22)	(Bhutan Football Federation)
21	GK	Kinzang Dema	15 February 2004 (age 22)	(Bhutan Football Federation)

== Recent results and fixtures ==
The following is a list of match results in the last 12 months, as well as any future matches that have been scheduled.

Legend

Win Draw Loss Fixture

=== 2026 ===
31 January 2026 SAFF U-19	Bangladesh	12–0	Bhutan	Pokhara, Nepal
12:00 UTC+5:45	Mamoni 28'; Trishna 43', 54', 60'; Munki 44', 45+3', 81', 90+3'; Alpi 73', 86', 90+5'; Arpita 90+4'			Stadium: Pokhara Rangasala; Attendance: 30; Referee: Anjana Rai (Nepal)

2 February 2026 SAFF U-19	Nepal	2–1	Bhutan	Pokhara, Nepal
15:00 UTC+5:45	Baduwal 36'; Rai 69'		Choden 87'	Stadium: Pokhara Rangasala; Attendance: 470; Referee: Mahi Tudu (India)

4 February 2026 SAFF U-19	India U17	8–0	Bhutan	Pokhara, Nepal
12:00 UTC+5:45	Lyngdoh 6'; Basnett 10'; P. Fernandes 16', 38', 40'; Linda 17'; Barman 25', 89'			Stadium: Pokhara Rangasala; Attendance: 150; Referee: Saraban Tahura (Bangladesh)

== Competitive record ==
=== FIFA U-20 Women's World Cup ===
FIFA U-20 Women's World Cup record
Host	Result	Position	Pld	W	D	L	GF	GA
(Canada) 2002	Did not qualify							
(Thailand) 2004	Did not qualify							
(Russia) 2006	Did not qualify							
(Chile) 2008	Did not qualify							
(Germany) 2010	Did not qualify							
(Japan) 2012	Did not qualify							
(Canada) 2014	Did not qualify							
(Papua New Guinea) 2016	Did not qualify							
(France) 2018	Did not qualify							
(Costa Rica) 2022	Did not qualify							
(Colombia) 2024	Did not qualify							
(Poland) 2026	Did not qualify							
Total	0/12	0 Titles	0	0	0	0	0	0

*Draws include knock-out matches decided on penalty kicks.

=== AFC U-19/U-20 Women's Asian Cup ===
AFC U-19/U-20 Women's Asian Cup record
Host	Result	Position	Pld	W	D	L	GF	GA
(India) 2002	Did not qualify							
(China) 2004	Did not qualify							
(Malaysia) 2006	Did not qualify							
(China) 2007	Did not qualify							
(China) 2009	Did not qualify							
(Vietnam) 2011	Did not qualify							
(China) 2013	Did not qualify							
(China) 2015	Did not qualify							
(China) 2017	Did not qualify							
(Thailand) 2019	Did not qualify							
(Uzbekistan) ~~2022~~	Cancelled							
(Uzbekistan) 2024	Did not qualify							
(Thailand) 2026	Did not qualify							
Total	0/11	0 Titles	0	0	0	0	0	0

*Draws include knock-out matches decided on penalty kicks.

=== AFC U-19/U-20 Women's Asian Cup qualification ===
AFC U-19/U-20 Women's Asian Cup qualification record
Hosts / Year	Result	GP	W	D	L	GS	GA
(India) 2002	Did Not Participate						
(China) 2004	Did Not Participate						
(Malaysia) 2006	Did Not Participate						
(China) 2007	Did Not Participate						
(China) 2009	Did Not Participate						
(Vietnam) 2011	Did Not Participate						
(China) 2013	Did Not Participate						
(China) 2015	Did Not Participate						
(China) 2017	Did Not Participate						
(Thailand) 2019	Did Not Participate						
(Uzbekistan) ~~2022~~	Cancelled						
(Uzbekistan) 2024	To be determined						
Total	0/10	0	0	0	0	0	0

=== SAFF U-18/U-19/U-20 Women's Championship ===
SAFF U-18/U-19/U-20 Women's Championship record
Year	Result	GP	W	D*	L	GF	GA	GD
(Bhutan) 2018	Group stage	4	1	0	3	13	9	+4
(Bangladesh) 2021	Group stage	4	1	0	3	5	13	−8
(India) 2022	Did Not Participate							
(Bangladesh) 2023	Group stage	3	0	0	3	0	21	−21
(Bangladesh) 2024	Group Stage	3	0	0	3	0	15	−15
(Bangladesh) 2025	Third place	6	2	0	4	12	21	−9
(Nepal) 2026	Group Stage	3	0	0	3	1	22	−21
Total	6/7	20	4	0	9	31	101	−70

*Draws include knock-out matches decided on penalty kicks.
