= 2006 AFC U-19 Women's Championship qualification =

Tournament details
- Teams: 12 (from 1 confederation)

The 2006 AFC U-19 Women's Championship qualification was qualification section of 2006 AFC U-19 Women's Championship.

== North Zone ==
All matches were held at Chinese Taipei

Team	Pld	W	D	L	GF	GA	GD	Pts
Japan	2	2	0	0	18	1	+17	6
Chinese Taipei	2	1	0	1	4	4	0	3
Hong Kong	2	0	0	2	0	17	−17	0

1 March 2006

Japan	4–1	Chinese Taipei

3 March 2006

Japan	14–0	Hong Kong

5 March 2006

Chinese Taipei	3–0	Hong Kong

== East Zone ==
All matches were held at Thailand

Team	Pld	W	D	L	GF	GA	GD	Pts
Australia	2	2	0	0	12	2	+10	6
Thailand	2	1	0	1	4	6	−2	3
Myanmar	2	0	0	2	0	8	−8	0

5 March 2006

Thailand	2–6	Australia

7 March 2006

Australia	6–0	Myanmar

9 March 2006

Thailand	2–0	Myanmar

== South Zone ==
All matches were held at India

Team	Pld	W	D	L	GF	GA	GD	Pts
India	2	2	0	0	16	0	+16	6
Kyrgyzstan	2	1	0	1	6	7	−1	3
Bangladesh	2	0	0	2	0	15	−15	0

5 March 2006

India	7–0	Kyrgyzstan

7 March 2006

Bangladesh	0–6	Kyrgyzstan

9 March 2006

India	9–0	Bangladesh

== West Zone ==
All matches were held at Jordan

Team	Pld	W	D	L	GF	GA	GD	Pts
Jordan	2	1	1	0	4	2	+2	4
Uzbekistan	2	1	1	0	4	2	+2	4
Singapore	2	0	0	2	0	4	−4	0

Jordan won group on a coin toss.

1 March 2006

Jordan	2–2	Uzbekistan

3 March 2006

Uzbekistan	2–0	Singapore

5 March 2006

Jordan	2–0	Singapore

== Qualified Teams ==
Automatically qualified

- South Korea (2004 Champions)
- China (2004 Runners-up)
- North Korea (2004 Third place)
- Malaysia (Hosts)

Qualified Teams

- Japan
- Australia
- India
- Jordan
