= 2024 SAFF U-19 Women's Championship =

Tournament details
- Host country: Bangladesh
- Dates: 2–8 February 2024
- Teams: 4 (from 1 sub-confederation)
- Venue: 1 (in 1 host city)

Final positions
- Champions: Bangladesh (4th title); India (2nd title)
- Third place: Nepal
- Fourth place: Bhutan

Tournament statistics
- Matches played: 7
- Goals scored: 26 (3.71 per match)
- Attendance: 9,779 (1,397 per match)
- Top scorer(s): (Bangladesh) Mst. Sagorika (India) Pooja (India) Sibani Devi (4 goals each)
- Best player: (Bangladesh) Mst. Sagorika

The 2024 SAFF U-19 Women's Championship was the fifth edition of the SAFF U-19 Women's Championship, an international football competition for women's under–19 national teams organized by SAFF. The tournament was held from 2 to 8 February 2024 in Bangladesh.

Bangladesh and India are the joint champion, both teams have finished 1–1 goals in the regulations time and 11–11 goals by penalties shoot-out in the final of the tournament on 8 February 2024.

== Host selection ==
At the SAFF Executive Committee meeting, held on 25 December 2023 in the Dhaka, Bangladesh SAFF announced the name of Bangladesh host country of the tournament.

== Venue ==
All matches will be played at the BSSS Mostafa Kamal Stadium in Dhaka, Bangladesh.

Dhaka	Dhaka is located in Bangladesh
BSSS Mostafa Kamal Stadium	Dhaka is located in Bangladesh
Capacity: 25,000	Dhaka is located in Bangladesh

== Participating nations ==
The following four nations will participate in the tournament.

Team	Appearances in the SAFF U-19 Women's Championship	Previous best performance
Bangladesh (Host)	5th	Champions (2018, 2021, 2023)
Bhutan	4th	Fourth-place (2018, 2023)
India	5th	Champions (2022)
Nepal	5th	Runners-up (2018)

== Players eligibility ==
Players born on or after 1 January 2005 are eligible to compete in the tournament. Each team has to register a squad of minimum 16 players and maximum 23 players, minimum two of whom must be goalkeepers.

== Match officials ==
Referees

- (Bangladesh) Jaya Chakma
- (India) Kanika Barman
- (Bhutan) Tshering Yangkhey
- (Nepal) Anjana Rai
- (Sri Lanka) Y.A. Pabasara Minisaraniyapa

Assistant referees

- (Bangladesh) Salma Akter Moni
- (Nepal) Prem Kumari Sunwar
- (India) Ri-iohlang Dhar
- (Nepal) Radhika Shakya
- (Sri Lanka) H.M. Malika Madhushani

== Round robin ==
Single round-robin, each team will play each other. The top teams contest in the final.

Key to colours in group tables
Table top two teams advance to the final

Tiebreakers

Teams are ranked according to points (3 points for a win, 1 point for a draw, 0 points for a loss), and if tied on points, the following tie-breaking criteria are applied, in the order given, to determine the rankings.

1. Points in head-to-head matches among tied teams;
2. Goal difference in head-to-head matches among tied teams;
3. Goals scored in head-to-head matches among tied teams;
4. If more than two teams are tied, and after applying all head-to-head criteria above, a subset of teams are still tied, all head-to-head criteria above are reapplied exclusively to this subset of teams;
5. Goal difference in all group matches;
6. Goals scored in all group matches;
7. Penalty shoot-out if only two teams are tied and they met in the last round of the group;
8. Disciplinary points (yellow card = 1 point, red card as a result of two yellow cards = 3 points, direct red card = 3 points, yellow card followed by direct red card = 4 points);
9. Drawing of lots.

=== Standings ===
Pos	Team	Pld	W	D	L	GF	GA	GD	Pts	Status
1	Bangladesh (H)	3	3	0	0	8	1	+7	9	Advance to the Final
2	India	3	2	0	1	14	1	+13	6	Advance to the Final
3	Nepal	3	1	0	2	2	7	−5	3	
4	Bhutan	3	0	0	3	0	15	−15	0	

Source: SAFF
(H) Hosts

=== Matches ===
2 February 2024
15:00

India	10–0	Bhutan
Sibani 8', 19', 36'; Pooja 31', 58', 59', 90+4'; Sulanjana Raul 52'; Menaka Devi 61'; Arina Devi 73'	Report

BSSS Mostafa Kamal Stadium, Dhaka
Attendance: 432
Referee: Jaya Chakma (Bangladesh)
2 February 2023
19:00

Nepal	1–3	Bangladesh
Sukriya Miya 54'	Report	Sagorika 40', 57'; Munki 42'

BSSS Mostafa Kamal Stadium, Dhaka
Attendance: 1,938
Referee: Kanika Barman (India)

4 February 2024
15:00

Bhutan	0–1	Nepal
	Report	Senu Pariyar 54'

BSSS Mostafa Kamal Stadium, Dhaka
Attendance: 60
Referee: Y.A. Pabasara Minisaraniyapa (Sri Lanka)
4 February 2024
19:00

Bangladesh	1–0	India
Sagorika 90+2'	Report

BSSS Mostafa Kamal Stadium, Dhaka
Attendance: 1,327
Referee: Tshering Yangkhey (Bhutan)

6 February 2024
15:00

India	4–0	Nepal
Neha 54', 81'; Sulanjana Raul 86'; Cindy Colney 90+3'	Report

BSSS Mostafa Kamal Stadium, Dhaka
Attendance: 0
Referee: Jaya Chakma (Bangladesh)
6 February 2024
19:00

Bangladesh	4–0	Bhutan
Nusrat Jahan Mitu 18'; Mst Oeyshi Khatun 31', 63'; Sree Moti Trishna Rani 58'	Report

BSSS Mostafa Kamal Stadium, Dhaka
Attendance: 1,143
Referee: Anjana Rai (Nepal)

== Final ==
8 February 2024
18:00

Bangladesh	1–1	India
Sagorika 90+3'	Report	Sibani 8'
Penalties
Afeida (penalty scored); Mst Surma Jannat (penalty scored); Mst Joynob Bibi Rita (penalty scored); Sapna (penalty scored); Munki (penalty scored); Mst Eity Khatun (penalty scored); Mst Sultana Akter (penalty scored); Umehla (penalty scored); Sagorika (penalty scored); Kanon Rani Bahadur (penalty scored); Swarna Rani Mandal (penalty scored)	11–11	(penalty scored) Neha; (penalty scored) Nitu; (penalty scored) Sibani Devi Nongmeikapam; (penalty scored) Lalita Boypai; (penalty scored) Thoibisana Chanu Toijam; (penalty scored) Sulanjana Raul; (penalty scored) Viskit Bara; (penalty scored) Pooja; (penalty scored) Heena Khatun; (penalty scored) Sonibia Devi Irom; (penalty scored) Anika Devi Sharubam

BSSS Mostafa Kamal Stadium, Dhaka, Bangladesh
Attendance: 4,879
Referee: Anjana Rai (Nepal)

== Winners ==
2024 SAFF U-20 Women's Championship Champions

Bangladesh
Fourth title

2024 SAFF U-20 Women's Championship Champions

India
Second title

== Awards ==
The following awards were given at the conclusion of the tournament:

Top Goalscorers	Most Valuable Player
(Bangladesh) Mst. Sagorika (India) Pooja (India) Sibani Devi	(Bangladesh) Mst. Sagorika

== Statistics ==
=== Goalscorers ===
There were 26 goals scored in 7 matches, for an average of 3.71 goals per match.

4 goals

- (Bangladesh) Mst. Sagorika
- (India) Pooja
- (India) Sibani Devi

2 goals

- (Bangladesh) Mst Oeyshi Khatun
- (India) Neha
- (India) Sulanjana Raul

1 goal

- (Bangladesh) Sree Moti Trishna Rani
- (Bangladesh) Nusrat Jahan Mitu
- (Bangladesh) Munki Akhter
- (India) Menaka Devi
- (India) Arina Devi
- (India) Cindy Remruatpuii Colney
- (Nepal) Sukriya Miya
- (Nepal) Senu Pariyar

Source: SAFF

=== Hat-trick ===
Player	Against	Result	Date	Ref
(India) Pooja	Bhutan	10–0	2 February 2024	
(India) Sibani Devi	Bhutan	10–0	2 February 2024	

== Controversy ==
The match was drawn after regulation time and penalty shoot-out and according to the by-laws sudden death was to be followed to decide the champion. However, Sri Lankan match commissioner D. Silva Jayasuriya Dilan decided to toss the coin to decide the champion and after the toss, the Indian women's team was declared champion. Being frustrated by this incident, Bangladeshi fans started throwing bottles on the ground. But soon, realising her mistake, the match commissioner again decided to continue the sudden death to decide the winner. However, the Indian players refused to participate and left the field, though Bangladeshi players remained on the ground. Finally, after five hours of internal talks and negotiations, both the teams were declared joint-champion.

== See also ==
- 2024 SAFF U-17 Championship
- 2024 SAFF U-20 Championship
- 2024 SAFF U-16 Women's Championship
- 2024 SAFF Women's Championship
