= Nepal women's national under-20 football team =

Women's youth association football team

Nepal Women's U-20
- Association: All Nepal Football Association
- Confederation: AFC (Asia)
- Sub-confederation: SAFF (South Asia)
- Head coach: Bal Gopal Shahu
- Captain: Sarah Bajracharya
- FIFA code: NEP

First international
- North Korea 19–0 Nepal (27 May 2004, Suzhou; China)

Biggest win
- Nepal 12–0 Pakistan (28 September 2018, Thimphu; Bhutan)

Biggest defeat
- North Korea 19–0 Nepal (27 May 2004, Suzhou; China)

AFC U-20 Women's Asian Cup
- Appearances: 1 (first in 2004)
- Best result: Group stage (2004)

SAFF U-20 Women's Championship
- Appearances: 6 (first in 2018)
- Best result: Runners-up (2018), 2023, 2025)

The Nepal women's national under-20 football team represents Nepal in international football competitions for players under the age of 20. They play SAFF U-20 Women's Championship, and AFC U-20 Women's Asian Cup. The team is yet to qualify for the FIFA U-20 Women's World Cup.

== Coaches ==
=== Coaching staff ===
As of 25 May 2025

Position	Name
Head coach	(Nepal) Yam Prasad Gurung
Assistant coach	(Nepal) Sandesh Kumar Shrestha
Assistant coach	(Nepal) Kiran Kumar Karki
Goalkeeper coach	(Nepal) Min Bahadur Basnet
Physiotherapipst	(Nepal) Shila Giri
Team Manager	(Nepal) Indu Duwal

== Current squad ==
The following players were called up for the 2026 AFC U-20 Women's Asian Cup qualification

No.	Pos.	Player	Date of birth (age)	Caps	Goals	Club
1	GK	Karuna Budathoki				(All Nepal Football Association) Bagmati Youth Club
20	GK	Sujata Tamang				(All Nepal Football Association) Bagmati Youth Club
22	GK	Lila Joshi				(All Nepal Football Association) Church Boys United
2	DF	Anisha Rai				(All Nepal Football Association) Koshi Province
3	DF	Sita Rokaya				(All Nepal Football Association) Karnali Province
4	DF	Ganga Rokaya				(All Nepal Football Association) Nepal Police
5	DF	Semihangma Limbu Pandhak				(All Nepal Football Association) Bagmati Youth Club
6	DF	Sajina Syangtan				(All Nepal Football Association) Koshi Province
12	DF	Sarita Kumari Nath				(All Nepal Football Association) Chandrapur Municipality
14	DF	Maya Maske				(All Nepal Football Association) Sankata Club
19	DF	Simran Rai				(All Nepal Football Association) Sankata
7	MF	Asmita Gurung				(All Nepal Football Association) Karnali Province
8	MF	Sushila KC				(All Nepal Football Association) Sankata
9	MF	Sukriya Miya				(All Nepal Football Association) Sankata
16	MF	Manisha Sen				(All Nepal Football Association) Waling Municipality
17	MF	Kusum Khatiwada				(All Nepal Football Association) APF FC
18	MF	Birsana Chaudhary (Captain)				(Bhutan Football Federation) Transport United
21	MF	Kabita Gurung				(All Nepal Football Association) Chandrapur Municipality
23	MF	Senu Pariyar				(All Nepal Football Association) Sankata
10	FW	Barsha Oli				(All Nepal Football Association) Church Boys United
11	FW	Samikshya Magar				(All Nepal Football Association) Sankata
13	FW	Meena Deuba				(All Nepal Football Association) Nepal Police
15	FW	Purnima Rai				(All Nepal Football Association) Sankata

== Recent results and fixtures ==
=== 2026 ===
31 January 2026	India	v	Nepal	Pokhara, Nepal
15:00 UTC+5:45				Stadium: Pokhara Rangasala

2 February 2026	Nepal	v	Bhutan	Pokhara, Nepal
15:00 UTC+5:45				Stadium: Pokhara Rangasala

4 February 2026	Bangladesh	v	Nepal	Pokhara, Nepal
15:00 UTC+5:45				Stadium: Pokhara Rangasala

== Competitive record ==
=== FIFA U-20 Women's World Cup ===
FIFA U-20 World Cup finals record										FIFA U-20 World Cup qualifying record								
Year	Result	Pts	Pld	W	D	L	GF	GA	GD	Result	Pts	Pld	W	D	L	GF	GA	GD
(Canada) 2002 to (France) 2018	did not qualify									Qualification based on AFC U-20 Women's Asian Cup's Result								
(Costa Rica) (Panama) 2020	Cancelled due to COVID-19 Pandemic									Qualification based on AFC U-20 Women's Asian Cup's Result								
(Costa Rica) 2022	Did not qualify									Qualification based on AFC U-20 Women's Asian Cup's Result								
(Colombia) 2024	Did not qualify									Qualification based on AFC U-20 Women's Asian Cup's Result								
(Poland) 2026	Did not qualify									Qualification based on AFC U-20 Women's Asian Cup's Result								
Total	0/13	0	0	0	0	0	0	0	0	1/12	1	3	0	0	3	2	29	−27

=== AFC U-20 Women's Asian Cup ===
AFC U-19 Championship finals record										AFC U-19 Championship qualifying record								
Year	Result	Pts	Pld	W	D	L	GF	GA	GD	Result	Pts	Pld	W	D	L	GF	GA	GD
(India) 2002	No Qualification Process									No Qualification Process								
(China) 2004	Group Stage	0	3	0	0	3	2	29	-27	No Qualification Process								
(Malaysia) 2006 to (China) 2017	Did not enter									Did not enter								
(Thailand) 2019	Did not qualify									2nd Round, Group B (2nd)	6	6	2	0	4	13	18	-5
(Uzbekistan) 2022	Cancelled due to COVID-19 Pandemic									Qualification Cancelled due to COVID-19 Pandemic								
(Uzbekistan) 2024	Did not qualify									2nd Round, Group B (1st)	6	5	2	0	3	12	15	-3
(Thailand) 2026	Did not qualify									Group A	TBD							
Total	1/11	0	3	0	0	3	2	29	-27	–	2/9	11	4	0	7	25	33	-8

=== SAFF U-20 Women's Championship ===
SAFF U-20 Women's Championship
Host/Year	Result	Position	GP	W	D	L	GS	GA	GD
(Bhutan) 2018	Runner-up	2nd	4	2	0	2	17	5	+12
(Bangladesh) 2021	Third	3rd	4	2	1	1	10	1	+9
(India) 2022	Third	3rd	4	0	0	4	4	18	-14
(Bangladesh) 2023	Runner-up	2nd	4	2	0	2	8	7	+1
(Bangladesh) 2024	Third	3rd	3	1	0	2	2	7	-5
(Bangladesh) 2025	Runner-up	2nd	6	4	0	2	30	8	+22
Total	0 Titles	6/6	25	11	1	13	71	44	+25
