= SAFF U-20 Women's Championship =

- Founded: 2018; 8 years ago
- Region: SAFF
- Teams: 7
- Related competitions: SAFF U-20 Championship
- Current champions: India (3rd title)
- Most championships: Bangladesh (5 titles)
- Website: saffederation.org
- 2026 SAFF U-19 Women's Championship

The SAFF U-18/U-19/U-20 Women's Championship is an annual international association football tournament for women's national football teams under the age of 18/19/20, governed by the South Asian Football Federation (SAFF). All the seven teams of the member associations are eligible to compete in tournament, unless sanctioned by AFC or FIFA.

== Results ==
Ed.	Year	Cat.	Host	Final			Third place playoff			No. of teams
Ed.	Year	Cat.	Host	Champion	Score	Runner-up	Third place	Score	Fourth place	No. of teams
1	2018	U-18	Bhutan	Bangladesh	1–0	Nepal	India	1–0	Bhutan	6
2	2021	U-19	Bangladesh	Bangladesh	1–0	India	Nepal	^{RR}	Bhutan	5
3	2022	U-18	India	India	^{RR}	Bangladesh	Nepal			3
4	2023	U-20	Bangladesh	Bangladesh	3–0	Nepal	India	^{RR}	Bhutan	4
5	2024	U-19	Bangladesh	Bangladesh India	1–1 (11–11 p)	None (Note: Bangladesh and India were declared joint champions)	Nepal	^{RR}	Bhutan	4
6	2025	U-20	Bangladesh	Bangladesh	^{RR}	Nepal	Bhutan	^{RR}	Sri Lanka	4
7	2026	U-19	Nepal	India U17	4–0	Bangladesh	Nepal	^{RR}	Bhutan	4

== Participating nations ==
Legend

- 1st – Champions
- 2nd – Runners-up
- 3rd – Third place
- 4th – Fourth place
- GS – Group stage
- q – Qualified for upcoming tournament
- — Hosts
- × – Did not enter
- • – Did not qualify
- × – Withdrew before qualification
- — Withdrew after qualification
- — Disqualified after qualification

Team	(Bhutan) 2018 (6)	(Bangladesh) 2021 (5)	(India) 2022 (3)	(Bangladesh) 2023 (4)	(Bangladesh) 2024 (4)	(Bangladesh) 2025 (4)	(Nepal) 2026 (4)	Total
Bangladesh	1st	1st	2nd	1st	1st	1st	2nd	7
Bhutan	4th	GS	×	4th	4th	3rd	4th	6
India (Note: also includes results of India U-17 team.)	3rd	2nd	1st	3rd	1st	×	1st	6
Maldives	GS	×	×	×	×	×	×	1
Nepal	2nd	GS	3rd	2nd	3rd	2nd	3rd	7
Pakistan	GS	×	×	×	×	×	×	1
Sri Lanka	×	GS	×	×	×	4th	×	2

=== Performance by nation ===
Nation	Champions	Runners-up	Third-place	Fourth-place
Bangladesh	5 (2018, 2021, 2023, 2024, 2025)	2 (2022, 2026)	—N/a	—N/a
India	3 (2022, 2024, 2026 (Note: India was represented by the India U-17 team.))	1 (2021)	1 (2018, 2023)	—N/a
Nepal	—N/a	3 (2018, 2023, 2025)	3 (2022, 2024, 2026)	—N/a
Bhutan	—N/a	—N/a	1 (2025)	4 (2018, 2023, 2024, 2026)
Sri Lanka	—N/a	—N/a	—N/a	1 (2025)

== Awards ==
Year	Most Valuable Player	Top scorer(s)		Best Goalkeeper	Fair play award
Year	Most Valuable Player	Player(s)	Goals	Best Goalkeeper	Fair play award
2018	(Bangladesh) Akhi Khatun	(Bangladesh) Sirat Jahan Shopna	8	Not awarded	Not awarded
2021	(Bangladesh) Shaheda Akter Ripa	(Bangladesh) Shaheda Akter Ripa	5	Not awarded	Nepal
2022	(India) Lynda Kom	(India) Lynda Kom	5	Not awarded	Bangladesh
2023	(Bangladesh) Shamsunnahar Junior	(Bangladesh) Shamsunnahar Junior (Nepal) Amisha Karki	4	(Bangladesh) Rupna Chakma	Bhutan
2024	Not awarded	(Bangladesh) Mosammat Sagorika (India) Pooja (India) Sibani Devi	4	Not awarded	Not awarded
2025	(Bangladesh) Mosammat Sagorika	(Nepal) Purnima Rai	10	(Bangladesh) Mile Akter	Sri Lanka
2026	(Bangladesh) Alpi Akter	(Bangladesh) Alpi Akter	7	(India) Munni	India

=== Winning coaches ===
Year	Team	Coach
2018	Bangladesh	(Bangladesh) Golam Robbani Choton
2021	Bangladesh	(Bangladesh) Golam Robbani Choton
2022	India	(Sweden) Thomas Dennerby
2023	Bangladesh	(Bangladesh) Golam Robbani Choton
2024	Bangladesh; India	(Bangladesh) Saiful Bari Titu (India) Shukla Dutta
2025	Bangladesh	(England) Peter Butler
2026	India U17	(Italy) Pamela Conti

== See also ==
- SAFF Championship
- SAFF U-20 Championship
- SAFF U-17 Championship
- SAFF Women's Championship
- SAFF U-17 Women's Championship
