= 2018 SAFF U-18 Women's Championship =

Tournament details
- Host country: Bhutan
- Dates: 28 September – 7 October
- Teams: 6 (from 1 confederation)
- Venue: 1 (in Thimphu host cities)

Final positions
- Champions: Bangladesh (1st title)
- Runners-up: Nepal
- Third place: India
- Fourth place: Bhutan

Tournament statistics
- Matches played: 10
- Goals scored: 65 (6.5 per match)
- Attendance: 24,383 (2,438 per match)
- Top scorer(s): (Bangladesh) Mossammat Sirat Jahan Shopna (8 goals)
- Best player: (Bangladesh) Akhi Khatun

The 2018 SAFF U-18 Women's Championship was the first edition of the SAFF U-18 Women's Championship, an international football competition for women's under-18 national teams organized by SAFF. The tournament was hosted from 28 September – 7 October 2018 at Changlimithang Stadium. Six teams from the region took part (Sri Lanka had its team withdrawn from the tournament).

== Venue ==
All matches were played at the Changlimithang Stadium in Thimphu, Bhutan.

Thimphu	Thimphu is located in Bhutan
Changlimithang Stadium	Thimphu is located in Bhutan
Capacity: 45,000	Thimphu is located in Bhutan

== Participating nations ==
Team	Appearances in the SAFF U-18 Women's Championship	Previous best performance
Bangladesh	1st	–
Bhutan (Host)	1st	–
India	1st	–
Maldives	1st	–
Nepal	1st	–
Pakistan	1st	–

== Draw ==
A draw for tournament ceremony was held on 7 July 2018 in Motijheel at conference room of Bangladesh Football Federation. SAFF general secretary Anwarul Haque Helal and BFF general secretary Abu Nayeem Shohag, were among others present on the occasion. Initially all of seven countries team participated for the draw, two groups A and B were made: group A consisted of India, Sri Lanka and Maldives and group B consisted of Nepal, Bangladesh, Bhutan and Pakistan. Later, however, Sri Lanka had their team withdrawn from the tournament and the groups were redefined.

Group A	Group B
India; Sri Lanka †; Maldives; Bhutan	Nepal; Bangladesh; Bhutan ‡ Pakistan

† Sri Lanka withdrew before tournament
‡ Bhutan drawn to Group A, thus both the groups redefined

== Squads ==
Each team had to register a squad of minimum 18 players and maximum 23 players, minimum three of whom must be goalkeepers.

== Players eligibility ==
Players born on or after 1 January 2000 were eligible to compete in the tournament. Each team had to register a squad of minimum 16 players and maximum 23 players, minimum two of whom must be goalkeepers.

== Group stage ==
Key to colours in group tables
Group winners and runners-up advance to the semi-finals

Tiebreakers

Teams are ranked according to points (3 points for a win, 1 point for a draw, 0 points for a loss), and if tied on points, the following tiebreaking criteria are applied, in the order given, to determine the rankings.

1. Points in head-to-head matches among tied teams;
2. Goal difference in head-to-head matches among tied teams;
3. Goals scored in head-to-head matches among tied teams;
4. If more than two teams are tied, and after applying all head-to-head criteria above, a subset of teams are still tied, all head-to-head criteria above are reapplied exclusively to this subset of teams;
5. Goal difference in all group matches;
6. Goals scored in all group matches;
7. Penalty shoot-out if only two teams are tied and they met in the last round of the group;
8. Disciplinary points (yellow card = 1 point, red card as a result of two yellow cards = 3 points, direct red card = 3 points, yellow card followed by direct red card = 4 points);
9. Drawing of lots.

=== Group A ===
Pos	Team	Pld	W	D	L	GF	GA	GD	Pts	Status
1	India	2	2	0	0	12	0	+12	6	Qualified for Knockout stage
2	Bhutan (H)	2	1	0	1	13	4	+9	3	Qualified for Knockout stage
3	Maldives	2	0	0	2	0	21	−21	0	

Source: Championship schedule according to the SAFF U18 Women's Championship official website.SAFF
(H) Hosts
- Times listed are UTC+6
28 September 2018
16:00 UTC+6:00

India	4–0	Bhutan
Devneta Roy 35', 50'; Manisha 64'; Roja 67'	SAFF; AIFF

Changlimithang Stadium
Attendance: 3,941
Referee: M. Rahman (Bangladesh)

30 September 2018
16:00 UTC+6:00

Bhutan	13–0	Maldives
Yeshey Bidha 3', 7'; Sonam Choden 16', 41', 44', 86'; Namgyel Den 19', 50'; Galley Wangmo 21', 72'; Suk Maya Galley 35'; Jamyang Choden 67'; Tandin Zangmo 84'	SAFF

Changlimithang Stadium
Attendance: 2,200
Referee: Nani Ram Thapa (Nepal)

2 October 2018
16:00 UTC+6:00

Maldives	0–8	India
	SAFF; AIFF	Roja 16'; Karishma Rai 19'; Pakpi Devi 22' (pen.); B. Mariyammal 27'; Soni Behera 34', 46'; Sangita Kumari 57'; Jannat Adam 62' (o.g.)

Changlimithang Stadium
Attendance: 2,466
Referee: K.L.S Chathuranga (Sri Lanka)

=== Group B ===
Pos	Team	Pld	W	D	L	GF	GA	GD	Pts	Status
1	Bangladesh	2	2	0	0	19	1	+18	6	Qualified for Knockout stage
2	Nepal	2	1	0	1	13	2	+11	3	Qualified for Knockout stage
3	Pakistan	2	0	0	2	0	29	−29	0	

Updated to match(es) played on 2 October 2018. Source: Championship schedule according to the SAFF U18 Women's Championship official website.SAFF
- Times listed are UTC+6
28 September 2018
19:00 UTC+6:00

Nepal	12–0	Pakistan
Poudel 5', 17', 19', 32', 38', 71', 74'; Limbu 47'; Rashmi Kumari Ghising 67'; Alisha Jimba 82'; Manjali Kumari Yonjan 87'; Manisha Raut 92'	Report

Changlimithang Stadium
Attendance: 1,348
Referee: Ugyen Dorji (Bhutan)

30 September 2018
19:00 UTC+6:00

Pakistan	0–17	Bangladesh
	Report	Shopna 10', 30', 40', 62', 73', 76', 90'; Marzia 7', 13', 22', 71'; Moushumi 37'; Akhi 58'; Krishna 74'; Tohura 87'; Sheuli 32', 69' (pen.)

Changlimithang Stadium
Attendance: 3,618
Referee: Tanmoy Dhar (India)

2 October 2018
19:00 UTC+6:00

Bangladesh	2−1	Nepal
Shopna 16'; Krishna 32'		Rashmi Kumari Ghising 90+2'

Changlimithang Stadium
Attendance: 1,941
Referee: D.D Indika Sendanayake (Sri Lanka)

== Knockout stage ==
- Times listed are UTC+6

=== Bracket ===
Semi-finals
5 October –
India	1 (1)
Nepal	1 (3)
5 October –
Bangladesh	4
Bhutan	0

Final
7 October –
Nepal	0
Bangladesh	1
Third Place
7 October –
India	1
Bhutan	0

=== Semi finals ===
5 October 2018
15:30 UTC+6:00

India	1−1	Nepal
Jabamani 62'	SAFF AIFF	15' Rashmi Kumari Ghising
Penalties
Devneta Roy (penalty missed); Asha Kumari (penalty missed); Jabamani (penalty scored); Manisha (penalty missed)	1−3	(penalty scored) Poudel; (penalty missed) Puja Rana; (penalty scored) Anjana Rani Magar

Changlimithang Stadium
Attendance: 3,148
Referee: Golam Mourshed Chowdhury (Bangladesh)

5 October 2018
19:00 UTC+6:00

Bangladesh	4−0	Bhutan
Sanjida 2'; Moushumi 45+3'; Krishna 60'; Shamsunnahar 86' (pen.)

Changlimithang Stadium
Attendance: 2,340
Referee: Kuldeep Tariyal (India)

=== Third place ===
7 October 2018
15:30 UTC+6:00

Bhutan	0–1	India
		72' Devneta Roy

Changlimithang Stadium
Attendance: 1,740
Referee: Md Shafiqul Islam (Bangladesh)

=== Final ===
7 October 2018
19:00 UTC+6:00

Bangladesh	1–0	Nepal
Masura 49'

Changlimithang Stadium
Attendance: 1,641
Referee: Abdulla Shathir (Maldives)

== Winners ==
2018 SAFF U-18 Women's Championship champions

Bangladesh
First title

== Goalscorers ==
There were 65 goals scored in 10 matches, for an average of 6.5 goals per match.

8 goals

- (Bangladesh) Mossammat Sirat Jahan Shopna

7 goals

- (Nepal) Rekha Poudel

4 goals

- (Bangladesh) Marzia
- (Bhutan) Sonam Choden

3 goals

- (Bangladesh) Krishna Rani Sarkar
- (India) Devneta Roy
- (Nepal) Rashmi Kumari Ghising

2 goals

- (Bangladesh) Sheuli Azim
- (Bangladesh) Mishrat Jahan Moushumi
- (Bhutan) Yeshey Bidha
- (Bhutan) Namgyel Den
- (Bhutan) Galley Wangmo
- (India) Asem Roja Devi
- (India) Soni Behra

1 goal

- (Bangladesh) Akhi Khatun
- (Bangladesh) Tohura Khatun
- (Bangladesh) Sanjida Akhter
- (Bangladesh) Shamsunnahar
- (Bangladesh) Masura Parvin
- (Bhutan) Suk Maya Galley
- (Bhutan) Jamyang Choden
- (Bhutan) Tandin Zangmo
- (India) Manisha
- (India) Karishma Rai
- (India) Yumlembam Pakpi Devi
- (India) Balamurugan Mariyammal
- (India) Sangita Kumari
- (India) Jabamani Tudu
- (Nepal) Saru Limbu
- (Nepal) Alisha Jimba
- (Nepal) Manjali Kumari Yonjan
- (Nepal) Manisha Raut
