= 2023 SAFF U-20 Women's Championship =

Tournament details
- Host country: Bangladesh
- Dates: 3–9 February
- Teams: 4 (from 1 sub-confederation)
- Venue: 1 (in Dhaka host cities)

Final positions
- Champions: Bangladesh (3rd title)
- Runners-up: Nepal

Tournament statistics
- Matches played: 7
- Goals scored: 32 (4.57 per match)
- Attendance: 22,748 (3,250 per match)
- Top scorer(s): (Nepal) Amisha Karki (Bangladesh) Shamsunnahar Jr. (4 goals each)
- Best player: (Bangladesh) Shamsunnahar Jr.
- Best goalkeeper: (Bangladesh) Rupna Chakma
- Fair play award: Bhutan

The 2023 SAFF U-20 Women's Championship was the 4th edition of the SAFF U-20 Women's Championship, an international football competition for women's under–20 national teams organized by SAFF. The tournament were played from 3–9 February 2023 in Bangladesh.

Bangladesh is the defending champion having defeated Nepal by 3–0 goals in the final of the tournament on 9 February 2023.

== Venue ==
All matches will held at the BSSS Mostafa Kamal Stadium in Dhaka, Bangladesh.

Dhaka	Dhaka is located in Bangladesh
BSSS Mostafa Kamal Stadium	Dhaka is located in Bangladesh
Capacity: 25,000	Dhaka is located in Bangladesh

== Participating nations ==
Team	Appearances in the SAFF U-20 Women's Championship	Previous best performance
Bangladesh (Host)	4th	Champions (2018, 2021)
Bhutan	3rd	Fourth-place (2018)
India	4th	Champions (2022)
Nepal	4th	Runners-up (2018)

== Players eligibility ==
Players born on or after 1 January 2003 are eligible to compete in the tournament. Each team has to register a squad of minimum 16 players and maximum 23 players, minimum two of whom must be goalkeepers.

== Match officials ==
Referees

- (Nepal) Maya Lado
- (India) Kusum Mandi
- (Bangladesh) Jaya Chakma
- (Bhutan) Yangkhey Tshering
- (Nepal) Meera Tamang

Assistant referees

- (Bangladesh) Salma Akter Mone
- (Nepal) Merina Dhimal
- (India) Chim Chim Serto
- (Nepal) Prem Kumari Sunwar

== Round robin ==
Key to colours in group tables
Table top two teams advance to the final

Tiebreakers

Teams are ranked according to points (3 points for a win, 1 point for a draw, 0 points for a loss), and if tied on points, the following tie-breaking criteria are applied, in the order given, to determine the rankings.

1. Points in head-to-head matches among tied teams;
2. Goal difference in head-to-head matches among tied teams;
3. Goals scored in head-to-head matches among tied teams;
4. If more than two teams are tied, and after applying all head-to-head criteria above, a subset of teams are still tied, all head-to-head criteria above are reapplied exclusively to this subset of teams;
5. Goal difference in all group matches;
6. Goals scored in all group matches;
7. Penalty shoot-out if only two teams are tied and they met in the last round of the group;
8. Disciplinary points (yellow card = 1 point, red card as a result of two yellow cards = 3 points, direct red card = 3 points, yellow card followed by direct red card = 4 points);
9. Drawing of lots.

=== Standings ===
Pos	Team	Pld	W	D	L	GF	GA	GD	Pts	Status
1	Bangladesh (H)	3	2	1	0	8	1	+7	7	Advance to the Final
2	Nepal	3	2	0	1	8	4	+4	6	Advance to the Final
3	India	3	1	1	1	13	3	+10	4	
4	Bhutan	3	0	0	3	0	21	−21	0	

Source: SAFF
(H) Hosts

=== Matches ===
3 February 2023
15:00

India	12–0	Bhutan
Apurna 29', 36'; Nitu 43'; Neha 45+2', 55', 90'; Anita 50', 69', 78'; Lynda 61', 63', 75'	Report (SAFF); Report (AIFF)

BSSS Mostafa Kamal Stadium, Dhaka
Attendance: 204
Referee: Jaya Chakma (Bangladesh)
3 February 2023
19:00

Nepal	1–3	Bangladesh
Manmaya 24'	Report (SAFF); Report (Prothom Alo)	Aklima 3'; Ripa 13', 90+1'

BSSS Mostafa Kamal Stadium, Dhaka
Attendance: 5,437
Referee: Kusum Mandi (India)

5 February 2023
15:00

Bhutan	0–4	Nepal
	Report (SAFF); Report (Goalnepal)	Amisha 19', 45+2', 63'; Preeti 61'

BSSS Mostafa Kamal Stadium, Dhaka
Attendance: 262
Referee: Jaya Chakma (Bangladesh)
5 February 2023
19:00

Bangladesh	0–0	India
	Report (SAFF); Report (New Age)

BSSS Mostafa Kamal Stadium, Dhaka
Attendance: 4,156
Referee: Maya Lama (Nepal)

7 February 2023
15:00

India	1–3	Nepal
Apurna 21'	Report (SAFF); Report (UNB)	Anjali 48'; Preeti 69'; Amisha 89'

BSSS Mostafa Kamal Stadium, Dhaka
Attendance: 150
Referee: Yangkhey Tshering (Bhutan)
7 February 2023
19:00

Bangladesh	5–0	Bhutan
Aklima 22', 60'; Shamsunnahar 30', 53', 61'	Report (SAFF); Report (Daily Star)

BSSS Mostafa Kamal Stadium, Dhaka
Attendance: 2,713
Referee: Kusum Mandi (India)

== Final ==
9 February 2023
18:00

Bangladesh	3–0	Nepal
Ripa 42'; Shamsunnahar 45+1'; Unnoti 87'	Report (SAFF); Report (Daily Star)

BSSS Mostafa Kamal Stadium, Dhaka
Attendance: 9,826
Referee: Yangkhey Tshering (Bhutan)

== Winners ==
2023 SAFF U-20 Women's Championship Champions

Bangladesh
Third title

== Awards ==
The following awards were given at the conclusion of the tournament:

Top Goalscorer	Most Valuable Player	Best goalkeeper	Fair Play award
(Bangladesh) Shamsunnahar Junior (Nepal) Amisha Karki	(Bangladesh) Shamsunnahar Junior	(Bangladesh) Rupna Chakma	Bhutan

== Statistics ==
=== Goalscorers ===
There were 32 goals scored in 7 matches, for an average of 4.57 goals per match. Source: SAFF

4 Goals

- (Bangladesh) Shamsunnahar Junior
- (Nepal) Amisha Karki

3 Goals

- (Bangladesh) Shaheda Akter Ripa
- (Bangladesh) Most Aklima Khatun
- (India) Anita Kumari
- (India) Lynda Kom
- (India) Neha
- (India) Apurna Narzary

2 Goals

- (Nepal) Preeti Rai

1 Goal

- (Bangladesh) Unnoti Khatun
- (India) Nitu Linda
- (Nepal) Manmaya Damai
- (Nepal) Anjali Chand

=== Hat-tricks ===
Player	Against	Result	Date	Ref
(India) Neha	Bhutan	12–0	3 February 2023	
(India) Anita Kumari	Bhutan	12–0	3 February 2023	
(India) Lynda Kom	Bhutan	12–0	3 February 2023	
(Bangladesh) Shamsunnahar Junior	Bhutan	5–0	7 February 2023	
(Nepal) Amisha Karki	Bhutan	4–0	5 February 2023	

== See also ==
2023 in SAFF
Men's
U-16 Championship	U-19 Championship	Senior Championship (Final)
Women's
U-17 Championship	U-20 Championship	
