= 2023–24 Bangladesh Women's Football League =

6th season of the Bangladesh Women's Football League

Bangladesh Women's Football League
- Season: 2023–24
- Dates: 27 April–28 May 2024
- Champions: Nasrin Sporting Club (1st title)
- SAFF Club Championship: Nasrin Sporting Club
- Matches: 36
- Goals: 200 (5.56 per match)
- Best player: Mosammat Sultana (Bangladesh Army FC)
- Top goalscorer: Sabina Khatun (Nasrin Sporting Club) (17 Goals)
- Highest scoring: Jamalpur Kacharipara Akadas 0–19 Nasrin Sporting Club (29 April 2024)
- Longest winning run: 8 Matches; Nasrin Sporting Club
- Longest unbeaten run: 8 Matches; Nasrin Sporting Club
- Longest winless run: 8 Matches; Jamalpur Kacharipara Akadas
- Longest losing run: 8 Matches; Jamalpur Kacharipara Akadas

The 2023–24 Bangladesh Women's Football League,also known as the UCB Women's Football League 2023–24 due to sponsorship reason. It was the 6th season of the Bangladesh Women's Football League, the top level of women's football in Bangladesh, since its establishment in 2011. The league has been started on 27 April 2024 and concluded on 28 May 2024.

Nasrin Sporting Club is the current title holder, having won 1st title in the 2023–24 edition.

== Venue ==
All matches were played at the BSSS Mostafa Kamal Stadium in Dhaka, Bangladesh

Dhaka	Dhaka is located in Bangladesh
BSSS Mostafa Kamal Stadium	Dhaka is located in Bangladesh
Capacity: 25,000	Dhaka is located in Bangladesh

== Teams ==
=== Clubs and locations ===
The following nine teams were contested in the league.

Locations of the 2023–24 Bangladesh Women's Football League teams

Team	Location	Appearance
ARB College Sporting Club	Noakhali	3rd
Bangladesh Army FC	Dhaka	1st
Dhaka Rangers FC	Dhaka	2nd
Farashganj SC	Dhaka Farashganj	2nd
Jamalpur Kacharipara Akadas	Jamalpur	4th
Nasrin Sporting Club	Dhaka	4th
Siraj Srity Songsod	Rajshahi	2nd
Suddopuskorini Jubo SC	Rangpur	3rd
Uttara FC	Dhaka Uttara	2nd

=== Personnel and sponsoring ===
Team	Head coach	Captain	Kit manufacturer	Shirt sponsor (chest)
ARB College Sporting Club	(Bangladesh) Md Golam Rayhan Bapon	(Bangladesh) Tahura Khatun		Toma Group
Bangladesh Army FC	(Bangladesh) Golam Rabbani Choton	(Bangladesh) Mehenur Akter Mim		
Dhaka Rangers FC	(Bangladesh) Md Shofiqul Hasan Polash	(Bangladesh) Ronjona Rani		
Farashganj SC Women	(Bangladesh) Khokon Das	(Bangladesh) Sadia Akter		
Jamalpur Kacharipara Akadas	(Bangladesh) Md Shofiqul Islam	(Bangladesh) Fareda Khatun		Smart Technologies (BD) Ltd.
Nasrin Sporting Club	(Bangladesh) Shohel Rahman	(Bangladesh) Sabina Khatun	Wearix	Berger Paints
Suddopuskorini Jubo SC	(Bangladesh) Shamim Khan Miskin	(Bangladesh) Ruma Akhter Ote	Rangpur Group	Harvard ExCeL Digital School
Siraj Srity Songsod	(Bangladesh) Md Shahiduzzaman Kamal	(Bangladesh) Ruma Akter		
Uttara FC	(Bangladesh) Md Jaman Ahmed	(Bangladesh) Saurovi Akter Eity		

== League table ==
Pos	Team	Pld	W	D	L	GF	GA	GD	Pts	Qualification
1	Nasrin Sporting Club (C)	8	7	1	0	67	4	+63	22	Qualification to the 2025 SAFF Club Championship
2	ARB College SC	8	6	1	1	48	5	+43	19	
3	Bangladesh Army FC	8	6	0	2	24	5	+19	18	
4	Suddopuskorini Jubo SC	8	4	1	3	16	18	−2	13	
5	Siraj Srity Songsod	8	3	2	3	16	6	+10	11	
6	Farashganj SC Women	8	3	0	5	11	25	−14	9	
7	Dhaka Rangers FC	8	2	1	5	12	29	−17	7	
8	Uttara FC Women	8	2	0	6	5	35	−30	6	
9	Jamalpur Kacharipara Akadas	8	0	0	8	1	73	−72	0	

Source: BFF
(C) Champions

== Results ==
No Home \ No Away	ARBSC	BAFC	DRFC	FSCW	JKXI	NSC	SJSC	SSS	UFCW
ARB College Sporting Club	—			6–0	17–0	2–2			10–0
Bangladesh Army FC	1–0	—	7–1				1–2	1–0	
Dhaka Rangers FC	0–4		—	1–0			0–2	1–1	
Farashganj SC		0–2		—	6–0	0–11			3–0
Jamalpur Kacharipara Akadas		0–8	1–9		—	0–19			0–2
Nasrin Sporting Club		3–1	13–0			—	7–0		10–0
Suddopuskorini Jubo SC	2–8			0–1	8–0		—	0–0	
Siraj Srity Songsod	0–1			3–1	4–0	1–2		—	
Uttara FC		1–3	1–0				1–2	0–7	—

Updated to match(es) played on unknown. Source: BFF
Legend: Blue = left column team win; Yellow = draw; Red = top row team win.

== Results by games ==
Team ╲ Round	1	2	3	4	5	6	7	8	9
ARB College Sporting Club	L	W	W	W	W	D	W	W	–
Bangladesh Army FC	W	–	W	W	W	L	L	W	W
Dhaka Rangers FC	D	L	L	L	W	–	W	L	L
Farashganj SC	W	L	L	–	L	W	W	L	L
Jamalpur Kacharipara Akadas	L	L	L	L	L	L	L	–	L
Nasrin Sporting Club	W	W	–	W	W	D	W	W	W
Suddopuskorini Jubo SC	–	L	D	W	L	W	L	W	W
Siraj Srity Songsod	D	W	D	L	–	W	L	L	L
Uttara FC	L	W	W	L	L	L	–	L	L

Source: BFF
W = Win; D = Draw; L = Lose

== Positions by round ==
Team ╲ Round	1	2	3	4	5	6	7	8	9
ARB College Sporting Club	7	3	2	2	2	2	2	2	2
Bangladesh Army FC	3	4	3	3	3	3	3	3	3
Dhaka Rangers FC	4	7	7	8	6	8	6	7	7
Farashganj SC	2	6	6	7	8	6	4	5	6
Jamalpur Kacharipara Akadas	9	9	9	9	9	9	9	9	9
Nasrin Sporting Club	1	1	1	1	1	1	1	1	1
Suddopuskorini Jubo SC	6	8	8	6	7	5	7	4	4
Siraj Srity Songsod	5	2	5	5	5	4	5	6	5
Uttara FC	8	5	4	4	4	7	8	8	8

Leader & Champion
Runner Up

Source: BFF

== Season statistics ==
=== Goalscorers ===
There have been 200 goals scored in 36 matches, for an average of 5.56 goals per match. Source: BFF

17 Goals

- (Bangladesh) Sabina Khatun (Nasrin Sporting Club)

15 Goals

- (Bangladesh) Mst. Sagorika (ARB Sporting Club)

11 Goals

- (Bangladesh) Sumaya Matsushima (Nasrin Sporting Club)
- (Bangladesh) Tohura Khatun (ARB College Sporting Club)
- Mosammat Sultana (Bangladesh Army FC)
- (Bangladesh) Alpi Akter (Siraj Srity Songsod)

9 Goals

- (Bangladesh) Shamsunnahar Jr. (Nasrin Sporting Club)

7 Goals

- (Bangladesh) Ritu Porna Chakma (Nasrin Sporting Club)
- (Bangladesh) Kolpona Akter (Dhaka Rangers FC)

6 Goals

- (Bangladesh) Sauravi Akanda Prity (ARB College Sporting Club)
- (Bangladesh) Thuinuye Marma (Siraj Srity Songsod)

5 Goals

- (Bangladesh) Maria Manda (Nasrin Sporting Club)
- (Bangladesh) Sanjida Akter (Nasrin Sporting Club)
- Tonima Biswas (Bangladesh Army FC)

4 Goals

- (Bangladesh) Monika Chakma (Nasrin Sporting Club)
- (Bangladesh) Popi Rani (Farashganj SC)
- Shikha Akter (Bangladesh Army FC)
- (Bangladesh) Most Shila Akter (Suddopuskorini Jubo SC)
- (Bangladesh) Kakoli Soren (Suddopuskorini Jubo SC)

3 Goals

- (Bangladesh) Munki Akhter (ARB Sporting Club)
- (Bangladesh) Mst Halima Akter (ARB College Sporting Club)
- (Bangladesh) Most Taspia Akter Tisha (Siraj Srity Songsod)
- (Bangladesh) Krishna Rani Sarkar (Nasrin Sporting Club)
- (Bangladesh) Hoimonti Khalko (Farashganj SC)
- (Bangladesh) Masura Parvin (Nasrin Sporting Club)
- (Bangladesh) Sapna Rani (ARB Sporting Club)

2 Goals

- (Bangladesh) Afeida Khandaker (ARB College Sporting Club)
- (Bangladesh) Marufa Akter (Dhaka Rangers FC)
- (Bangladesh) Shanti Mardi (Dhaka Rangers FC)
- (Bangladesh) Bithika Kisku (Dhaka Rangers FC)
- (Bangladesh) Seemoti Shornali Terke (Farashganj SC)
- (Bangladesh) Mst Bonna Khatun (Farashganj SC)
- (Bangladesh) Josna (Uttara FC Women)
- (Bangladesh) Shaheda Akter Ripa (ARB Sporting Club)
- (Bangladesh) Mst Surma Jannat (ARB Sporting Club)
- (Bangladesh) Marzia (Nasrin Sporting Club)
- Nowson Jahan Niti (Bangladesh Army FC)
- (Bangladesh) Nusrat Jahan Mitu (Siraj Srity Songsod)
- (Bangladesh) Most Eilamoni Akhter Eila (Uttara FC Women)
- (Bangladesh) Sathi Munda (Farashganj SC)
- (Bangladesh) Most Ruma Akter Ote (Suddopuskorini Jubo SC)

1 Goal

- (Bangladesh) Mst Ruma Akter (Siraj Srity Songsod)
- (Bangladesh) Most Swapna Akter (Uttara FC Women)
- Mst Momita Khatun (Bangladesh Army FC)
- (Bangladesh) Kohati Kisku (ARB Sporting Club)
- (Bangladesh) Most Mousumi Akter (Siraj Srity Songsod)
- (Bangladesh) Taspia Tisha (Siraj Srity Songsod)
- (Bangladesh) Umehla Marma (Siraj Srity Songsod)
- (Bangladesh) Kranuching Marma (Siraj Srity Songsod)
- Mst Mahfuza Khatun (Bangladesh Army FC)
- (Bangladesh) Rubina Akter (Jamalpur Kacharipara Akadas)
- (Bangladesh) Rehena Akter (Dhaka Rangers FC)
- (Bangladesh) Mst Jarmin Akter (Dhaka Rangers FC)
- (Bangladesh) Rupali Ray Rupa (Suddopuskorini Jubo SC)

=== Own goals ===
† Bold Club indicates winner of the match

Player	Club	Opponent	Result	Date	Ref
(Bangladesh) Nandita Akter Juti	Siraj Srity Songsod	Nasrin Sporting Club	1–2	10 May 2024	

=== Hat-tricks ===
† Bold Club indicates winner of the match

Player	For	Against	Result	Date	Ref
(Bangladesh) Maria Manda^{4}	Nasrin Sporting Club	Jamalpur Kacharipara Akadas	19–0	29 April 2024	
(Bangladesh) Shamsunnahar^{4}	Nasrin Sporting Club	Jamalpur Kacharipara Akadas	19–0	29 April 2024	
(Bangladesh) Sabina Khatun ^{4}	Nasrin Sporting Club	Jamalpur Kacharipara Akadas	19–0	29 April 2024	
(Bangladesh) Mst. Sagorika	ARB Sporting Club	Dhaka Rangers FC	4–0	5 May 2024	
(Bangladesh) Mst. Sagorika^{4}	ARB Sporting Club	Jamalpur Kacharipara Akadas	17–0	9 May 2024	
(Bangladesh) Mst Tohura Khatun^{7}	ARB Sporting Club	Jamalpur Kacharipara Akadas	17–0	9 May 2024	
(Bangladesh) Mst. Sagorika	ARB Sporting Club	Suddopuskorini Jubo SC	8–2	13 May 2024	
(Bangladesh) Alpi Akter	Siraj Srity Songsod	Uttara FC Women	7–0	16 May 2024	
(Bangladesh) Kolpona Akter	Dhaka Rangers FC	Jamalpur Kacharipara Akadas	9–1	21 May 2024	
(Bangladesh) Sabina Khatun^{5}	Nasrin Sporting Club	Dhaka Rangers FC	13–0	28 May 2024	
(Bangladesh) Sumaya Matsushima	Nasrin Sporting Club	Dhaka Rangers FC	13–0	28 May 2024	
(Bangladesh) Most Shila Akter	Suddopuskorini Jubo SC	Jamalpur Kacharipara Akadas	8–0	28 May 2024	

== See also ==
- 2023–24 Bangladesh Premier League (football)
- 2023–24 Bangladesh Championship League
