= Umehla Marma =

Bangladeshi footballer

Personal information
- Full name: Umehla Marma
- Date of birth: 14 August 2007 (age 19)
- Height: 1.50 m (4 ft 11 in)
- Position: Midfielder

Team information
- Current team: Ansar & VDP

Youth career
- Suehlamong FA

Senior career*
Years	Team	Apps	(Gls)
2023–2025	Siraj Srity Songsod		
2025–	Ansar & VDP	9	(12)

International career^{‡}
2022–2024	Bangladesh U17		
2024–	Bangladesh U20	14	(0)
2025–	Bangladesh	11	(1)
Medal record
Women's football
Representing Bangladesh
SAFF U-20 Women's Championship
Winner	2025 Bangladesh
Winner	2024 Bangladesh
- * Club domestic league appearances and goals as of 16 February 2026 ‡ National team caps and goals as of 6 June 2026

Umehla Marma (Bengali: উমেহ্লা মারমা; born 1 January 2007) is a Bangladeshi professional footballer who plays as a midfielder for Bangladesh Women's League club Ansar & VDP and the Bangladesh national team.

== Early career ==
Marma began her football career in Kachukhali, Kawkhali, Rangamati District. Her development was associated with the local football infrastructure surrounding Suehlamong Football Academy. She first came to the attention of Bangladesh Football Federation coaches in 2021, when she travelled to the federation's turf to play in a match on International Women's Day. She was called up to the Bangladesh U15 team the following year.

In 2026, Marma scored a hat-trick for Suehlamong Football Academy, helping the team win the Chattogram regional championship in the Prothom Alo–Star News Women's Football Tournament.

== Club career ==
Marma played for Siraj Srity Songsod in the 2023–24 Bangladesh Women's Football League.

She was signed by Ansar & VDP for the 2025–26 Bangladesh Women's Football League. In the league, she scored her first hat-trick against Nasrin.

== International career ==
=== Youth ===
In the 2024 SAFF U-19 Women's Championship, Marma featured for Bangladesh in a 1–1 draw against India in the final, with the match proceeding to a penalty shootout. After all 11 players from both sides converted their penalties, officials controversially attempted to decide the winner by a coin toss, initially favoring India. Following protests and review of the tournament rules, which had no provision for such a method, both teams were declared joint champions.

=== Senior ===
In 2025, Marma was named in the Bangladesh squad for the 2026 AFC Women's Asian Cup qualification. The team secured dominant victories over Bahrain (7–0), Myanmar (2–1), and Turkmenistan (7–0), collecting all nine points from three matches. Their historic qualification was confirmed following a 2–2 draw between Bahrain and Turkmenistan.

Marma scored her first senior international goal for Bangladesh against Maldives during the 2026 SAFF Women's Championship.

== Statistics ==
=== International goals ===
No.	Date	Venue	Opponent	Score	Result	Competition
1.	28 May 2026	Jawaharlal Nehru Stadium, Margao, India	Maldives	2–0	4–2	2026 SAFF Women's Championship

== Honours ==
Bangladesh U20

- SAFF U-20 Women's Championship: 2024, 2025
