= Maria Manda =

Bangladeshi footballer (born 2003)

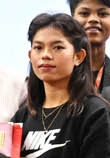
- Manda in 2024

Personal information
- Date of birth: May 10, 2003 (age 23)
- Place of birth: Mandirgona, Dhobaura, Mymensingh, Bangladesh
- Height: 1.47 m (4 ft 10 in)
- Position: Midfielder

Team information
- Current team: Farashganj
- Number: 8

Youth career
- 2011–2014: Kalsindur Government Primary School

Senior career*
Years	Team	Apps	(Gls)
2020–2023	Bashundhara Kings	37	(4)
2023–2024	Nasrin	8	(5)
2024	→ Royal Thimphu College (loan)	1	(?)
2025	Thimphu City	6	(18)
2025—	Farashganj	10	(14)

International career^{‡}
2014–2016	Bangladesh U14	10	(6)
2015–2019	Bangladesh U17	11	(3)
2018–	Bangladesh U20	9	(1)
2016–	Bangladesh	53	(1)
Medal record
Women's football
Representing Bangladesh
SAFF Women's Championship
Winner	2024 Nepal
Winner	2022 Nepal
Runner-up	2016 India
South Asian Games
Bronze medal – third place	2016 India
SAFF U-20 Women's Championship
Winner	2018 Bhutan
Winner	2021 Bangladesh
Bangamata U-19 Women's International Gold Cup
Winner	2019 Bangladesh
AFC U-14 Girls' Regional C'ship – South and Central
Winner	2015 Bangladesh	Bangladesh U14
- * Club domestic league appearances and goals as of 16 February 2026 ‡ National team caps and goals as of 6 June 2026

Maria Manda Sangma (Bengali: মারিয়া মান্দা; born 10 May 2003) is a Bangladeshi professional footballer who plays as a midfielder for Farashganj and the Bangladesh women's national team.

She has also played for the Bangladesh women's national futsal team.

== Early life ==
Maria Manda Sangma was born on 10 May 2003 in Mandirgona village, Dhobaura, Mymensingh. She belongs to Garo tribe.

== Early career ==
Maria became involved in football in 2011. In 2013, they became the first champion for the famous Kalsindur Government Primary School in Dhobaura, where she was a player.

== Club career ==
=== Nasrin ===
In the 2023–24 season, Maria joined Nasrin in the Bangladesh Women's Football League.

=== Royal Thimphu College ===
In 2024, she was loaned to Royal Thimphu College in Bhutan to play in the preliminary stage of the 2024-25 AFC Women's Champions League. Prior to participating in the tournament, she featured in a league match for the club.

=== Thimphu City ===
In 2025, she signed for Bhutanese club Thimphu City.

=== Farashganj ===
Maria joined Farashganj in the 2025–26 Bangladesh Women's Football League. She scored her first goal in her debut for the club.

== International career ==
=== Youth ===
She was selected the captain of Bangladesh U-15 team. Under her leadership, Bangladesh became the undefeated champion after defeating India. She was then called up to the Under-14 national team in 2014. Bangladesh won the AFC U-14 Regional Championship in Tajikistan under her co-captaincy. She was also the co-captain of the undefeated champion team in the AFC U-16 qualifiers.

After she was selected for the Bangladesh women's national football team, she contributed to the runners-up of SAFF. As a result, Bangladesh under-15 armband was tied to her arm in the safe. Afterwards, India lost twice in the same tournament.

She was selected to the Bangladesh U16 team for the 2015 AFC U-16 Women's Championship qualification – Group B matches in 2014. Bangladesh participated in the AFC U-14 Girls' Regional Championship – South and Central held in Nepal in 2015. Bangladesh women's national U16 football team played the qualifier for the 2017 AFC U-16 Women's Championship. And, she played in 2017 AFC U-16 Women's Championship qualification – Group C matches where Bangladesh became group C champion. Being group C champion, Bangladesh qualified for the 2017 AFC U-16 Women's Championship in Thailand in September 2017.

She was the member of the Bangladesh U19 team who won the 2018 SAFF U-18 Women's Championship and Bangamata U-19 Women's International Gold Cup in 2019. She later played in the 2019 AFC U-19 Women's Championship qualification.

=== Senior ===
Maria was selected to Bangladesh women's national football team for 2016 South Asian Games, where they became third in the women's football category and won Bronze. Also she was in the team for 2016 SAFF Women's Championship.Bangladesh were in the Group B. She played two of the group B matches and being group B unbeaten champion, Bangladesh demolish Maldives 6–0 to barge in the semi-final into SAFF Championship final where they lost against India and became Runner-up. And in 2018, she also played in the 2020 AFC Women's Olympic Qualifying Tournament. She played in 2019 SAFF Women's Championship for Bangladesh where they became semi-finalist.

Maria scored her first international goal on 2 December 2025 against Azerbaijan during the 2025 Bangladesh Tri-Nations Cup at the National Stadium.

Before the start of the 2026 SAFF Women's Championship, Maria was appointed captain of the national team.

== Statistics ==
=== International goals ===
No.	Date	Venue	Opponent	Score	Result	Competition
1.	2 December 2025	National Stadium, Dhaka, Bangladesh	Azerbaijan	1–1	1–2	2025 Bangladesh Tri-Nations Cup

== Honours ==
=== Club ===
Bashundhara Kings Women

- Bangladesh Women's Football League
  - Winners (2): 2019–20, 2020–21

=== International ===
- SAFF Women's Championship

Winner : 2022, 2024
Runner-up : 2016

- South Asian Games

Bronze : 2016

- SAFF U-20 Women's Championship

Champion (2): 2018, 2021

- Bangamata U-19 Women's International Gold Cup

Champion trophy shared (1): 2019

- AFC U-14 Girls' Regional C'ship – South and Central

Bangladesh U-14 Girls'
Champion : 2015
