= Nabiran Khatun =

Bangladeshi professional footballer

Personal information
- Date of birth: 18 December 2006 (age 19)
- Place of birth: Magura, Bangladesh
- Height: 1.45 m (4 ft 9 in)
- Position: Centre-back

Youth career
- 2017–2020: BKSP

Senior career*
Years	Team	Apps	(Gls)
2024–2025	Farashganj		
2025–	BKSP		

International career^{‡}
2022–	Bangladesh U20	19	(0)
2025–	Bangladesh	5	(0)
Medal record
Women's football
Representing Bangladesh
SAFF U-20 Women's Championship
Winner	2025 Bangladesh
Winner	2024 Bangladesh
Winner	2023 Bangladesh
Runner-up	2022 India
- * Club domestic league appearances and goals as of 30 May 2026 ‡ National team caps and goals as of 7 April 2026

Nabiran Khatun (Bengali: নবীরন খাতুন IPA: [nobiɾɔn kʰatun]; born 18 December 2006) is a Bangladeshi professional footballer who plays as a centre-back for BKSP, the Bangladesh U20 national team and the Bangladesh national team.

== Early life ==
Born in Magura, Nabiran Khatun comes from a Muslim family. In 2017, she was admitted to Bangladesh Krira Shikkha Protishtan as a fifth-grade student at its Savar campus, marking the formal beginning of her football journey. She led the Magura district team to the JFA U-14 title, scoring twice in the final.

== Club career ==
=== Farashganj ===
Nabiran played for Farashganj in the Bangladesh Women's Football League 2024.

== International career ==
=== Youth ===
Nabiran featured in all four matches as Bangladesh finished runners-up at the 2022 SAFF U-18 Women's Championship. She was subsequently a member of the Bangladesh squads that won the 2023 SAFF U-20 Women's Championship and the 2024 SAFF U-19 Women's Championship. During this period, she primarily played as a forward.

She appeared in all of Bangladesh's matches during the victorious campaign at the 2025 SAFF U-20 Women's Championship. She also appeared in all three matches of the 2026 AFC U-20 Women's Asian Cup qualification, helping Bangladesh to qualify for the 2026 AFC U-20 Women's Asian Cup for the first time in the nation's history.

=== Senior ===
Nabiran had her first senior team callup for friendly matches against United Arab Emirates in March 2025. During the preparations for UAE friendlies, the head coach Peter Butler converted and trained her as a defender. She was a member of the Bangladesh team which secured qualification for the 2026 AFC Women's Asian Cup for the first time. Nabiran made her international debut on 24 October 2025, in a friendly match against Thailand. In February 2026, she was named in the final squad for the AFC Women's Asian Cup.
