= Shamsunnahar (footballer, born 2003) =

Bangladeshi footballer

Shamsun Nahar
Personal information
- Date of birth: 31 January 2003 (age 23)
- Place of birth: Kolsindur, Dhobaura, Mymensingh, Bangladesh
- Height: 1.55 m (5 ft 1 in)
- Position: Left-back

Team information
- Current team: Farashganj
- Number: 3

Youth career
- Kalsindur Government Primary School

Senior career*
Years	Team	Apps	(Gls)
2020–2023	Bashundhara Kings	18	(4)
2023–2024	Nasrin	8	(11)
2025	Thimphu City	5	(11)
2025–	Farashganj	10	(6)

International career^{‡}
2014–2016	Bangladesh U-14	8	(3)
2014–2018	Bangladesh U-16	12	(8)
2018–	Bangladesh U-19	9	(2)
2016–	Bangladesh	54	(0)
Medal record
Women's football
Representing Bangladesh
SAFF Women's Championship
Winner	2024 Nepal
Winner	2022 Nepal
Runner-up	2016 India
South Asian Games
Bronze medal – third place	2016 India
SAFF U-20 Women's Championship
Winner	2018 Bhutan
Winner	2021 Bangladesh
Bangamata U-19 Women's International Gold Cup
Winner	2019 Bangladesh
- * Club domestic league appearances and goals as of 16 February 2026 ‡ National team caps and goals as of 6 June 2026

Shamsun Nahar (Note: also known as Shamsun Nahar Sr.) (Bengali: শামছুন্নাহার IPA: [ʃamsunːahaɾ]; born 31 January 2003) is a Bangladeshi professional footballer who plays as a left-back for Farashganj and Bangladesh women's national football team.

== Early career ==
Shamsunnahar first played in 2011 Bangamata Sheikh Fazilatunnesa Mujib Gold Cup Football Tournament for Kalsindur Government Primary School.

== Club career ==
=== Thimphu City ===
In 2025, she signed with Bhutan Women's National League club Thimphu City.

=== Farashganj ===
She joined Farashganj for the 2025–26 Bangladesh Women's Football League.

== International career ==
Shamsunnahar was selected to the Bangladesh women's national under-17 football team for the 2017 AFC U-16 Women's Championship qualification – Group C matches. She played first time at the tournament in the match against Iran on 27 August 2016.

== Honours ==
=== Club ===
Bashundhara Kings Women

- Bangladesh Women's Football League
  - Winners (2): 2019–20, 2020–21

=== International ===
- SAFF Women's Championship

Champion: 2022, 2024
Runner-up: 2016

- South Asian Games

Bronze: 2016

- SAFF U-20 Women's Championship

Champion (2): 2018, 2021

- Bangamata U-19 Women's International Gold Cup

Champion trophy shared (1): 2019
AFC U-14 Girls' Regional Championship – South and Central
Bangladesh U-14 Girls'

- Champion (2): 2015, 2016
