= Ansar & VDP FC Women =

Bangladeshi women's association football club

Ansar & VDP Women
- Full name: Ansar and Village Defence Party Football Club Women
- Short name: AVFC
- Founded: 2004; 22 years ago
- Ground: Bir Sherestha Shaheed Shipahi Mostafa Kamal Stadium
- Capacity: 25,000
- Owner: Bangladesh Ansar
- Head coach: Trishna Chakma
- League: Bangladesh Women's Football League
- 2025–26: BWFL, 7th of 11
Home colours	Away colours

Ansar & VDP FC Women (Bengali: আনসার ও ভিডিপি এফসি মহিলা), is a Bangladeshi professional women's football club from Dhaka. They participate in the Bangladesh Women's Football League, the women's premier football league in Bangladesh.

== History ==
In 2004, the Bangladesh Ansar formed a women's football team to participate in the first ever women's football tournament in Bangladesh. The team finished runners-up, losing 0–1 to Dhaka. In 2009, Ansar won the inaugural Women's National Football Championship. They won consecutive National Championship titles from 2011 to 2012. They finished runners-up in 2014, losing to Mymensingh on penalties in the final, after a 1–1 draw.

They eventually formed a team to participate in the 2025–26 Bangladesh Women's Football League. On 1 January 2026, they were defeated 2–3 by Saddapuskuruni Jubo SC in their first league game.

== Current squad ==
As of 1 January 2026

Note: Flags indicate national team as defined under FIFA eligibility rules; some limited exceptions apply. Players may hold more than one non-FIFA nationality.

No.	Pos.	Nation	Player
1	GK	BAN	Mahlathui Marma
2	DF	BAN	Rumi Rani
3	DF	BAN	Mafuiching Marma
4	DF	BAN	Sauravi Rani
5	DF	BAN	Tania Akter Fomi
6	DF	BAN	Methuiching Marma
7	DF	BAN	Kranuching Marma
8	MF	BAN	Joba Rani
9	FW	BAN	Mamoni Chakma
10	FW	BAN	Purnima Marma
11	MF	BAN	Umehla Marma
12	FW	BAN	Manti Chakma
13	FW	BAN	Munmun Akter (Captain)
15	DF	BAN	Priyanka Urang
16	MF	BAN	Nazmin Nahar
17	FW	BAN	Jahanara Akther

No.	Pos.	Nation	Player
19	MF	BAN	Mst Shahanaz
20	FW	BAN	Ching Me Pru Marma
21	DF	BAN	Atuma Marma
22	GK	BAN	Monira
23	DF	BAN	Munni Khatun
24	FW	BAN	Lucky Sawtal
25	GK	BAN	Sunali Munda
28	MF	BAN	Aroti Rani
29	GK	BAN	Hlanuching Marma
30	GK	BAN	Kemi Marma
31	DF	BAN	Thuinuma Marma
34	FW	BAN	Ma Prue Ching Marma
35	FW	BAN	Suichingma Marma

== Competitive record ==
As of 13 February 2026

Season	Division	League								League top scorer(s)	
Season	Division	P	W	D	L	GF	GA	Pts	Position	Players	Goals
2025–26	BWFL	10	3	3	4	31	27	12	7	(Bangladesh) Umehla Marma	12

== Head coach's record ==
As of 13 February 2026

Head coach	From	To	P	W	D	L	GF	GA	%W
(Bangladesh) Trishna Chakma	1 October 2025	Present	10	3	3	4	31	27	30.00

== Club management ==
=== Technical staff ===
Position	Name
Team manager	(Bangladesh) Md Zahidul Islam
Team Leader	(Bangladesh) Miraj Shifat-E-Khoda
Head coach	(Bangladesh) Trishna Chakma
Assistant coach	(Bangladesh) Aungmraching Marma
Goalkeeper coach	(Bangladesh) Suehla Mong Marma
Team officials	(Bangladesh) Minar Hossain
Equipment manager	(Bangladesh) Mahmudul Hassan Milon

== Honours ==
- National Women Championship
  - Champions (3): 2009, 2011, 2012
  - Runners-up (1): 2014
