= Bangladesh Krira Shikkha Protishtan women's football team =

Bangladeshi association women's football club

BKSP Women
- Full name: Bangladesh Krira Shikkha Protishtan Football Club Women
- Short name: BKSP
- Founded: 2016; 10 years ago
- Ground: Bir Sherestha Shaheed Shipahi Mostafa Kamal Stadium
- Capacity: 25,000
- Owner: BKSP
- Head coach: Hasan Al Masud
- League: Bangladesh Women's Football League
- 2025–26: BWFL, 6th of 11

Bangladesh Krira Shikkha Protishtan women's football team (Bengali: বাংলাদেশ ক্রীড়া শিক্ষা প্রতিষ্ঠান নারী ফুটবল দল), known as BKSP FC Women, is a professional women's football club from Bangladesh that represents the national sports institute, Bangladesh Krira Shikkha Protishtan. The team currently participates in the Bangladesh Women's Football League, the premier women's football league in Bangladesh.

== History ==
In 2016, Bangladesh Krira Shikkha Protishtan (BKSP) began their Women's Football Trainee Admission Program. The junior team won the Subroto Cup U17 Girls Tournament for three consecutive years from 2017 to 2019.

The institution first formed a women's football team to participate in the Bangladesh Women's Football League in the 2025–26 season. On 29 December 2025, they played their first league match and defeated defending champions Nasrin Sporting Academy 8–0 at the Bir Sherestha Shaheed Shipahi Mostafa Kamal Stadium in Dhaka. Nevertheless, in their next game held on 7 January 2026, the team suffered a 4–0 defeat to Rajshahi Stars.

== Current squad ==
As of 29 December 2025

Note: Flags indicate national team as defined under FIFA eligibility rules; some limited exceptions apply. Players may hold more than one non-FIFA nationality.

No.	Pos.	Nation	Player
1	GK	BAN	Mst Fardosi Akter Shonale
2	DF	BAN	Nabiran Khatun (captain)
3	DF	BAN	Ritu Akter
4	DF	BAN	Mst Airin Khatun
5	DF	BAN	Mat Boishakhi Khatun
7	FW	BAN	Ayonto Bala Mahato
8	MF	BAN	Umma Kulsum
9	MF	BAN	Puja Chakma
10	FW	BAN	Mst Mira Khatun
11	MF	BAN	Fatema Akter
12	MF	BAN	Mst Afsana Akter
13	MF	BAN	Rupa Akter
14	FW	BAN	Mst Almina
15	MF	BAN	Reya

No.	Pos.	Nation	Player
16	DF	BAN	Kobita Rani
17	DF	BAN	Mishu Rani
18	DF	BAN	Mst Amena Khatun
19	MF	BAN	Anonna Murmu Bithi
20	FW	BAN	Protima Munda
21	DF	BAN	Anamika Uran
22	GK	BAN	Mst Jyoti Khatun
23	GK	BAN	Pretha Biswas
24	FW	BAN	Mst Runa Akter
28	MF	BAN	Shosti Munda
29	DF	BAN	Tithi Rani Mahato
30	GK	BAN	Meghla Rani Roy
45	DF	BAN	Mst Eti Akter
64	FW	BAN	Tangila Afroz Hira

== Competitive record ==
As of 13 February 2026

Season	Division	League								League top scorer(s)	
Season	Division	P	W	D	L	GF	GA	Pts	Position	Players	Goals
2025–26	BWFL	10	4	2	4	34	15	14	6	(Bangladesh) Reya	7

== Head coach's record ==
As of 13 February 2026

Head coach	From	To	P	W	D	L	GF	GA	%W
(Bangladesh) Hasan Al Masud	1 October 2025	Present	10	4	2	4	34	15	40.00

== Club management ==
=== Current technical staff ===
Position	Name
Head coach	(Bangladesh) Hasan Al Masud
Assistant coach	(Bangladesh) Asia Khatun Bithi, Md Faruk Hossain
Physiotherapist	(Bangladesh) Lotfa Akter
Team manager	(Bangladesh) Md Golam Mabud Hasan
Assistant manager	(Bangladesh) Paritosh Dewan
