= Ritu Porna Chakma =

Bangladeshi footballer (born 2003)

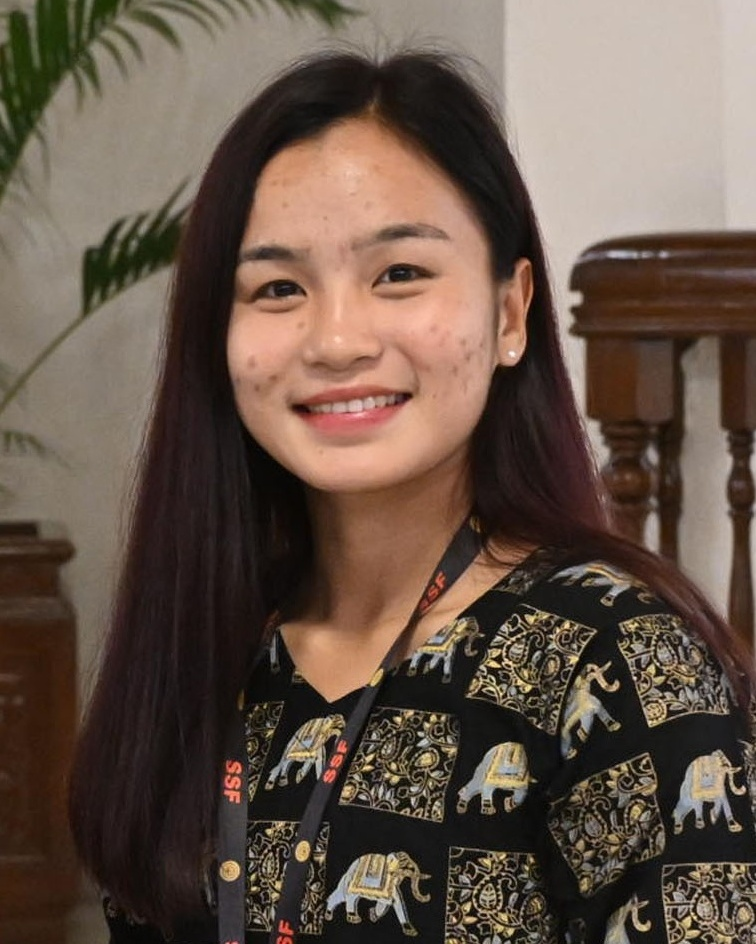
- Chakma in 2025

Personal information
- Date of birth: 30 December 2003 (age 22)
- Place of birth: Kawkhali Upazila, Rangamati District, Bangladesh
- Height: 1.47 m (4 ft 10 in)
- Positions: Left winger; midfielder

Team information
- Current team: Ayeyawady
- Number: 17

Youth career
- 2016–2022: BKSP

Senior career*
Years	Team	Apps	(Gls)
2020–2023	Bashundhara Kings	25	(15)
2023–2024	Nasrin	8	(7)
2024	→ Royal Thimphu College (loan)	1	(?)
2025	Paro	8	(13)
2025–	Rajshahi Stars	10	(11)
2026–	→ Ayeyawady (loan)	9	(3)

International career^{‡}
2018–2020	Bangladesh U17		
2020–2021	Bangladesh U19	5	(3)
2021–	Bangladesh	45	(15)
Medal record
Women's football
Representing Bangladesh
SAFF Women's Championship
Winner	2022 Nepal
Winner	2024 Nepal
SAFF U-20 Women's Championship
Winner	2021 Bangladesh
- * Club domestic league appearances and goals as of 29 July 2026 ‡ National team caps and goals as of 21 September 2026

Ritu Porna Chakma (Bengali: ঋতুপর্ণা চাকমা; Chakma: 𑄢𑄨𑄖𑄪𑄛𑄧𑄢𑄴𑄚 𑄌𑄇𑄴𑄟; born 30 December 2003) is a Bangladeshi professional footballer who plays as a winger or midfielder for the Bangladesh national team and Ayeyawady.

== Early life ==
Ritu Porna Chakma was born on 30 December 2003 in Kawkhali, Rangamati. She is of indigenous Chakma community.

She studied at Mogachhari Government Primary School. At school, a teacher named Birsen Chakma introduced her to football. She started playing football in 2012 while attending primary school. In 2013, at the age of 10, she took part in the Bangamata Gold Cup Football tournament, representing her school.

Ritu is the oldest among four sisters and one brother. After the deaths of her father in 2015 and her younger brother in 2022, her mother, Kala Sona Chakma, and her sisters supported her.

== Club career ==
In the 2023–24 season, Chakma joined Nasrin in the Bangladesh Women's Football League.

In 2024, she was loaned to Bhutanese club Royal Thimphu College for the 2024–25 AFC Women's Champions League, scoring once in two preliminary stage appearances against Bam Khatoon. Prior to participating in the tournament, she featured in a league match for the club.

In 2025, she signed with Paro, another Bhutanese club, where she scored four goals in her first two appearances. In the season, she managed to score 13 goals in 8 matches.

On 22 December 2025, she joined Rajshahi Stars for the 2025–26 Bangladesh Women's Football League.

In 2026, she signed a three-month deal with Ayeyawady for the Myanmar Women League. She made her debut for the club in a 4–0 victory against Thitsar Arman. She made her debut in the 2026–27 AFC Women's Champions League against Jurong. After the AWCL campaign ended, her loan spell with Ayeyawady ended, and she returned to her parent club.

== International career ==
Chakma made her senior debut for the Bangladesh women's national team in 2019. The following year, she participated in the 2022 SAFF Women's Championship, where Bangladesh secured its first title in the tournament's history, held in Kathmandu. She also played for the Bangladesh U-19 team during this period, including a match where she scored twice against Sri Lanka.

She was part of the squad that won the 2022 and 2024 SAFF Women's Championship.

On 30 October 2024, Chakma scored the winning goal in the final of the SAFF Women's Championship against Nepal and was named the tournament's Most Valuable Player. On the next month, she received an offer from a European club, North Macedonian club Brera Tiverija.

During the AFC Women's Asian Cup qualifiers, Chakma scored in Bangladesh's 7–0 victory over Bahrain on 29 June 2025. On 2 July 2025, she scored twice in a 2–1 win against Myanmar in Yangon, helping Bangladesh qualify for the AFC Women's Asian Cup for the first time in the nation's history.

== Style of play ==
Chakma primarily plays as a left winger, although she is also capable of operating as an attacking midfielder. She is known for her pace, dribbling ability, creativity in the final third, and powerful left-footed shots. She is also capable of delivering inswinging set-pieces and scoring directly from corner kicks, as well as from acute angles.

Peter Butler described her as "one of the best wingers in South Asia" in 2026.

== Career statistics ==
Scores and results list Bangladesh's goal tally first, score column indicates score after each goal scored by Chakma.

List of international goals scored by Ritu Porna Chakma
No.	Date	Venue	Opponent	Score	Result	Competition
1	10 September 2022	Dasharath Rangasala, Kathmandu, Nepal	Pakistan	6–0	6–0	2022 SAFF Women's Championship
2	16 September 2022	Dasharath Rangasala, Kathmandu, Nepal	Bhutan	4–0	8–0	2022 SAFF Women's Championship
3	4 December 2023	BSSS Mostafa Kamal Stadium, Dhaka, Bangladesh	Singapore	2–0	8–0	Friendly
4	4 December 2023	BSSS Mostafa Kamal Stadium, Dhaka, Bangladesh	Singapore	5–0	8–0	Friendly
5	24 July 2024	Changlimithang Stadium, Thimphu, Bhutan	Bhutan	3–1	5–1	Friendly
6	27 July 2024	Changlimithang Stadium, Thimphu, Bhutan	Bhutan	4–2	4–2	Friendly
7	27 October 2024	Dasharath Rangasala, Kathmandu, Nepal	Bhutan	1–0	7–1	2024 SAFF Women's Championship
8	30 October 2024	Dasharath Rangasala, Kathmandu, Nepal	Nepal	2–1	2–1	2024 SAFF Women's Championship
9	29 June 2025	Thuwunna Stadium, Yangon, Myanmar	Bahrain	2–0	7–0	2026 AFC Women's Asian Cup qualification
10	2 July 2025	Thuwunna Stadium, Yangon, Myanmar	Myanmar	1–0	2–1	2026 AFC Women's Asian Cup qualification
11	2 July 2025	Thuwunna Stadium, Yangon, Myanmar	Myanmar	2–0	2–1	2026 AFC Women's Asian Cup qualification
12	5 July 2025	Thuwunna Stadium, Yangon, Myanmar	Turkmenistan	5–0	7–0	2026 AFC Women's Asian Cup qualification
13	5 July 2025	Thuwunna Stadium, Yangon, Myanmar	Turkmenistan	7–0	7–0	2026 AFC Women's Asian Cup qualification
14	3 June 2026	Jawaharlal Nehru Stadium, Margao, India	Nepal	1–1	2–1	2026 SAFF Women's Championship
15	6 June 2026	Jawaharlal Nehru Stadium, Margao, India	India	1–1	1–3	2026 SAFF Women's Championship

== Awards and honors ==
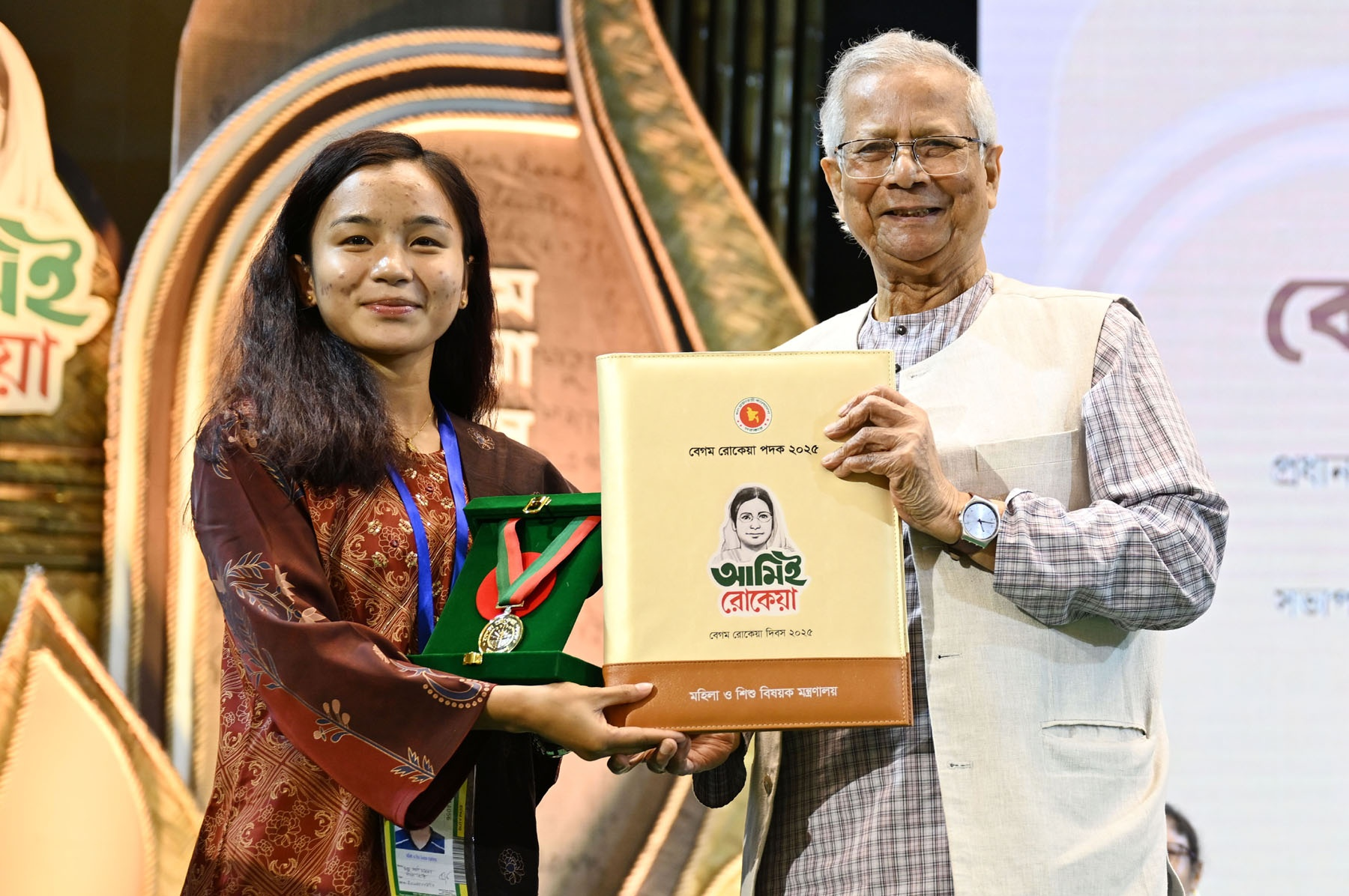
Chakma receiving 2025 Begum Rokeya Padak.

On 9 December 2025, Ritu was awarded the Begum Rokeya Padak 2025 in the category of women's awakening (sports).

=== Honours ===
Bashundhara Kings

- Bangladesh Women's Football League: 2021–22, 2021–22

Rajshahi Stars

- Bangladesh Women's Football League: 2025–26

Bangladesh U-20

- SAFF Women's Championship: 2021

Bangladesh

- SAFF Women's Championship: 2022, 2024
