= Palichara Stadium =

Upazila-Level Stadiums in Bangladesh

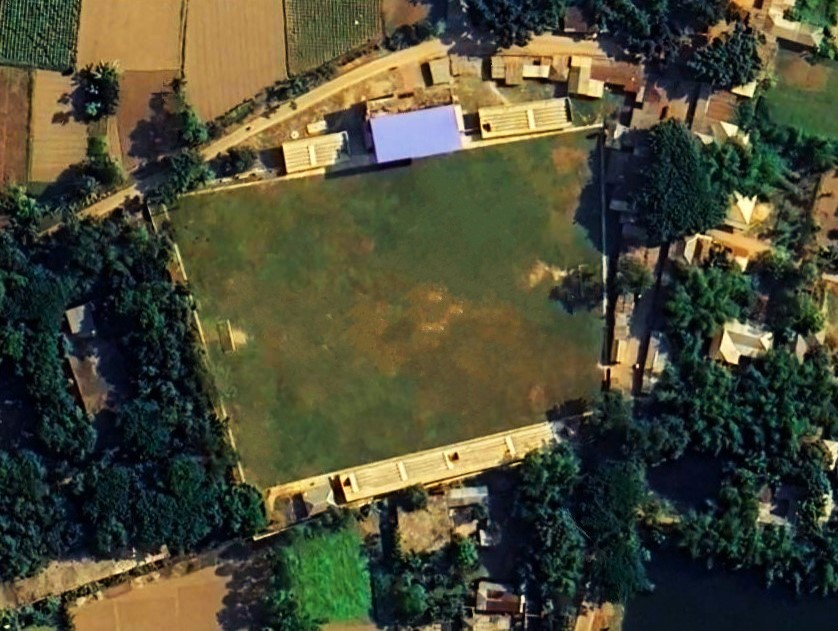
- Palichara Stadium in November 2022
- Interactive map of Palichara Stadium
- Location: Palichhara, Saddapuskuruni Union, Rangpur Sadar
- Coordinates: 25°40′10.9″N 89°11′16.5″E
- Owner: National Sports Council
- Scoreboard: No
- Acreage: 4 acres (1.6 ha)

Construction
- Groundbreaking: 2021
- Built: 2021–2022
- Opened: 2 August 2023
- Cost: ৳ 5.61 crore

Tenant
- Saddapuskuruni Jubo SC Rangpur

Palichara Stadium (Bengali: পালিচড়া স্টেডিয়াম) is an upazila-level stadium in Bangladesh, opened in 2023. is located near Nayapukur College Bazar in Palichara village, Saddapuskuruni Union, Sadar Upazila, approximately 14 kilometers from Rangpur. The National Sports Council constructed this stadium which serves as the home ground of the Saddapuskuruni Jubo SC Rangpur. In addition, age-based competitions at the regional level are also held here.

== History ==
=== Background ===
In 2011, Palichara Government Primary School became the runner-up in the Primary School Gold Cup Football Tournament of Bangladesh. The following year, the school became the national champion in the same tournament, which sparked growing interest in women's football in Palichara. To train footballers, the Saddapuskuruni Jubo SC Rangpur was established in 2013.

In the following years, the Saddapuskuruni Club and the women of Palichara represented Bangladesh in domestic competitions, leagues, and age-based teams such as the Under-16, Under-17, and Under-19 categories, and some also played for the national team. In recognition of the continued success of Palichara’s women footballers in winning various titles with these teams, the National Sports Council took the initiative to construct the stadium under the project titled Advanced Development, including a Modern Media Center and an Indoor Stadium at Rangpur District Stadium.

=== Construction ===
In March 2021, the construction of the stadium began on the grounds of M.N. High School and Majida Khatun College in the Nayapukur area of Palichara village. The construction was completed in November 2022 for 56,067,000 Bangladeshi Taka. On 2 August 2023, the stadium was officially inaugurated along with other infrastructures in Rangpur District.

== Structure ==
Palichara Stadium is built on 4 acres of land in the Nayapukur area of the village. The trapezium-shaped field has spectator galleries and a pavilion building on its eastern and western sides. Besides the main field, the stadium also includes residential facilities for players, changing rooms, a dining hall, an auditorium, and a separate room for press conferences.

== Usage ==
The stadium serves as the home ground for Saddapuskuruni Jubo SC Rangpur, a northern team in the Bangladesh Women's Football League. In addition to the club's regular players, around 30 female footballers from Palichara and surrounding villages practice here regularly. In 2023, the regional final of the Under-12 National Women's Football Championship was held at this venue.
