= Monika Chakma =

Bangladeshi football player (born 2003)

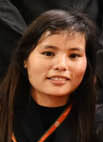
- Chakma in 2024

Personal information
- Date of birth: 15 September 2003 (age 23)
- Place of birth: Khagrachhari, Chattogram, Bangladesh
- Height: 1.45 m (4 ft 9 in)
- Position: Midfielder

Team information
- Current team: Farashganj
- Number: 6

Youth career
- Suehlamong FA

Senior career*
Years	Team	Apps	(Gls)
2020–2024	Bashundhara Kings	34	(10)
2024	Royal Thimphu College	2	(0)
2025	Paro	9	(11)
2025–2026	Farashganj	8	(5)
2026–	Rajshahi Stars	0	(0)

International career^{‡}
2012–2016	Bangladesh U14	10	(5)
2016–2018	Bangladesh U16	11	(0)
2018–2019	Bangladesh U19	8	(1)
2019–	Bangladesh	48	(4)
2018	Bangladesh futsal	3	(0)
Medal record
Women's football
Representing Bangladesh
SAFF Women's Championship
Winner	2024 Nepal
Winner	2022 Nepal
SAFF U-20 Women's Championship
Winner	2021 Bangladesh
Winner	2018 Bhutan
Bangamata U-19 Women's International Gold Cup
Winner	2019 Bangladesh
- * Club domestic league appearances and goals as of 16 February 2026 ‡ National team caps and goals as of 21 September 2026

Monika Chakma (Chakma: 𑄟𑄧𑄚𑄨𑄇 𑄌𑄋𑄴𑄟𑄳𑄦; Bengali: মনিকা চাকমা; born 15 September 2003) is a women's professional footballer who plays as a midfielder for the Bangladesh national team.

Monika gained recognition in 2019 when she scored a goal against Mongolia during the Bangamata U-19 Women's International Gold Cup. She is popularly known by the nickname "Magical Chakma". Besides football, she has also played for the Bangladesh national futsal team.

== Early life and education ==
Monika Chakma was born on September 15, 2003, in Sumontpara, Lakshmichhari, located in the Khagrachari district of the Chattogram Division, Bangladesh. She is the youngest of five daughters of Bindu Kumar Chakma and Robi Mala Chakma. Her elder sister is Anika Chakma.

She is currently an undergraduate student of American International University, Bangladesh.

== Early career ==
Monika Chakma first competed in the Bangamata Sheikh Fazilatunnesa Mujib Football Tournament in 2010, held at Marachengi Government Primary School in Lakshmichhari. In 2012, she relocated to Chattogram, where Rangamati Maghachari facilitated her admission to Rangamati Maghachari Government Primary School. Representing her school in the 2013 Bangamata Football Tournament, she achieved runner-up status at the national level.

== Club career ==
=== Royal Thimphu College ===
In 2024, she was loaned to Bhutanese club Royal Thimphu College SC for the 2024–25 AFC Women's Champions League, scoring once in two preliminary stage appearances against Bam Khatoon. Prior to participating in the tournament, she featured in a league match for the club.

=== Paro ===
In 2025, Monika signed with Bhutan Women's National League club Paro.

=== Farashganj ===
She joined Farashganj in the 2025–26 Bangladesh Women's Football League. She scored her first goal in her debut for the club.

=== Rajshahi Stars ===
She joined Rajshahi Stars to play in the 2026–27 AFC Women's Champions League.

== International career ==
Chakma was first selected for the Bangladesh Under-14 team, where she contributed three goals and helped secure the Fair Play trophy for a third-place finish in the 2012 AFC Tournament in Sri Lanka. She later represented Bangladesh in the Asian Under-14 Championship in Thailand and competed in the Bangamata U-19 Women's International Gold Cup, where she scored a goal against Mongolia in the semi-finals. This goal led to Bangladesh being featured in FIFA's "Fans' Favorite" page, and FIFA recognized her skill with the title "Magical Chakma."

== Personal life ==
Monika completed her Higher Secondary Certificate (HSC) in Humanities from Monica Ghagra College, following her studies at Rangamati Ghagra High School.

She joined the police force in January 2018 while continuing her education in computer in a polytechnic institute.

== Career statistics ==
=== International ===
As of match played 5 July 2025
Scores and results list Bangladesh's goal tally first, score column indicates score after each Monika Chakma goal.

List of international goals scored by Monika Chakma
No.	Date	Venue	Opponent	Score	Result	Competition
1	23 June 2022	Bir Sherestha Shaheed Shipahi Mostafa Kamal Stadium, Dhaka, Bangladesh	Malaysia	5–0	6–0	Friendly
2	10 September 2022	Dasharath Rangasala, Kathmandu, Nepal	Pakistan	1–0	6–0	2022 SAFF Women's Championship
3	30 October 2024	Dasharath Rangasala, Kathmandu, Nepal	Nepal	1–0	2–1	2024 SAFF Women's Championship
4	5 July 2025	Thuwunna Stadium, Yangon, Myanmar	Turkmenistan	4–0	7–0	2026 AFC Women's Asian Cup qualification

== See also ==
- 2017 SAFF U-15 Women's Championship
- 2018 SAFF U-15 Women's Championship
