= 2025–26 Bangladesh Women's Football League =

7th season of the Bangladesh Women's Football League

Bangladesh Women's Football League
- Season: 2025–26
- Dates: 29 December 2025–13 February 2026
- Champions: Rajshahi Stars (1st title)
- AFC Champions League: Rajshahi Stars
- SAFF Women's Club Championship: Rajshahi Stars
- Matches: 55
- Goals: 415 (7.55 per match)
- Best Player: (Bangladesh) Shamsunnahar Jr. (Farashganj SC)
- Top goalscorer: (Bangladesh) Alpi Akter (Rajshahi Stars) (30 goals)
- Best goalkeeper: (Bangladesh) Rupna Chakma (Rajshahi Stars)
- Highest scoring: Dhaka Rangers 24–0 Kachari Para Akadas (17 January 2026); Farashganj SC 23–0 Kachari Para Akadas (4 January 2026)
- Longest winning run: 10 Matches; Rajshahi Stars
- Longest unbeaten run: 10 Matches; Rajshahi Stars
- Longest winless run: 10 Matches; Kachari Para Akadas
- Longest losing run: 10 Matches; Kachari Para Akadas

The 2025–26 Bangladesh Women's Football League was the 7th season of the Bangladesh Women's Football League, the top level of women's football in Bangladesh, since its establishment in 2011.

Rajshahi Stars is the current title holder, having won 1st title in the 2025–26 edition.

== Venue ==
All matches was played at the BSSS Mostafa Kamal Stadium in Dhaka, Bangladesh

Dhaka	Dhaka is located in Bangladesh
BSSS Mostafa Kamal Stadium	Dhaka is located in Bangladesh
Capacity: 25,000	Dhaka is located in Bangladesh

== Teams ==
Eleven teams participated in the 2025–26 Bangladesh Women's Football League.

Locations of the 2025–26 Bangladesh Women's Football League teams

Team	Location	2025–26 Season
Ansar & VDP	Dhaka	1st
Bangladesh Army	Dhaka	2nd
Bangladesh Police	Dhaka	2nd
BKSP Football Club	Savar	1st
Dhaka Rangers	Dhaka	3rd
Farashganj SC	Dhaka	4th
Kacharipara Akadas	Jamalpur	5th
Nasrin SA	Dhaka	6th
Rajshahi Stars	Rajshahi	1st
Siraj Srity Songsod	Rajshahi	3rd
Suddopuskorini JSC	Rangpur	4th

== Personnel and sponsoring ==
Team	Head coach	Captain	Kit Manufacturer	Kit Sponsor
Ansar & VDP FC	(Bangladesh) Trishna Chakma	(Bangladesh) Munmun Akter	Made by club	
Bangladesh Army	(Bangladesh) Md Anwar Hossain	(Bangladesh) Mst Farjana Akter Rotna	Made by club	
Bangladesh Police	(Bangladesh) Wali Faisal	(Bangladesh) Sanjida Akter		Old Bailey, Mufasir Tours
BKSP Football Club	(Bangladesh) Hasan Al Masud	(Bangladesh) Protima Munda	Made by club	
Dhaka Rangers	(Bangladesh) Md Shofiqul Hasan Polash	(Bangladesh) Kalpana Aktar	Made by club	
Farashganj SC	(Bangladesh) Abu Ahmed Faysal	(Bangladesh) Maria Manda	Desinex	
Kacharirara Akadas	(Bangladesh) Maksudul Amin Rana	(Bangladesh) Soheli Sharmin		
Nasrin Sporting Academy	(Bangladesh) Md Monir Hossain	(Bangladesh) Mst Esrat Jahan		
Rajshahi Stars	(Bangladesh) Mahmuda Sharifa Oditi	(Bangladesh) Sheuli Azim	Hunkar	Nabil Group
Siraj Srity Songsod	(Bangladesh) Md Shahidul Islam	(Bangladesh) Mst Nurjahan Akter Moni		Poran Bazar
Suddopuskorini Jubo SC	(Bangladesh) Shamim Khan Miskin	(Bangladesh) Hoymonti Sukla Khalko	Made by club	

== Foreign players ==
Teams allowed to register maximum of four foreign players. All four can be part of the starting lineup.

Club	Player 1	Player 2
Farashganj	(Nepal) Puja Rana	(Nepal) Samikshya Ghimire
Rajshahi Stars	(Nepal) Bimala BK	(Nepal) Dipa Shahi

== League table ==
Pos	Team	Pld	W	D	L	GF	GA	GD	Pts	Qualification
1	Rajshahi Stars	10	10	0	0	90	0	+90	30	Qualification to the 2026–27 AFC Women's Champions League and 2026 SAFF Women's Club Championship
2	Farashganj SC	10	9	0	1	70	4	+66	27	
3	Bangladesh Army	10	8	0	2	68	5	+63	24	
4	Bangladesh Police	10	6	1	3	46	15	+31	19	
5	Saddapuskuruni	10	5	1	4	33	30	+3	16	
6	BKSP FC	10	4	2	4	34	15	+19	14	
7	Ansar & VDP	10	3	3	4	31	27	+4	12	
8	Dhaka Rangers	10	3	0	7	15	55	−40	9	
9	Siraj Srity	10	2	1	7	12	47	−35	7	
10	Nasrin SA	10	1	0	9	12	88	−76	3	
11	Kacharipara Akadas	10	0	0	10	4	129	−125	0	

Source: Sofascore

== Results ==
No Home \ No Away	AVFC	BAFC	BPFC	BKSP	DRFC	FSCW	JKXI	NSA	RSFC	SSS	SJSC
Ansar & VDP	—			2–2		1–4	12–0	7–1			2–3
Bangladesh Army	5–1	—		5–0	7–0			18–0		4–0	
Bangladesh Police	2–2	0–2	—		9–0				0–7	5–1	
BKSP FC			0–1	—		0–2	9–0	8–0			0–0
Dhaka Rangers	2–4			0–6	—	0–10		2–0			0–7
Farashganj SC		1–0	3–2			—	23–0		0–1	9–0	
Kacharirara Akadas		0–18	0–10		2–10		—		0–24	1–5	
Nasrin SC			0–15			0–11	9–1	—	0–12		2–9
Rajshahi Stars	8–0	3–0		4–0	10–0				—	13–0	
Siraj Srity	0–0			1–9	0–1			5–0		—	0–5
Suddopuskorini Jubo		0–9	0–2			0–7	9–0		0–8		—

Source: Sofascore
Legend: Blue = left column team win; Yellow = draw; Red = top row team win.

== Results by games ==
Team ╲ Round	1	2	3	4	5	6	7	8	9	10	11
Ansar & VDP	L	D	L	W	L	D	D	–	W	W	L
Bangladesh Army	W	W	W	W	W	L	W	W	–	W	L
Bangladesh Police	L	W	W	L	W	–	D	W	W	L	W
BKSP FC	W	L	L	–	L	D	W	W	L	W	D
Dhaka Rangers	L	–	W	L	L	W	L	L	L	L	W
Farashganj SC	W	W	–	W	W	W	W	L	W	W	W
Kacharirara Akadas	L	L	L	L	L	L	L	L	L	–	L
Nasrin SC	L	L	L	L	W	L	L	L	L	L	–
Rajshahi Stars	–	W	W	W	W	W	W	W	W	W	W
Siraj Srity	W	D	L	L	–	L	L	W	L	L	L
Suddopuskorini Jubo	W	L	W	W	L	W	–	L	W	L	D

Source: Sofascore
W = Win; D = Draw; L = Lose

== Positions by round ==
Team ╲ Round	1	2	3	4	5	6	7	8	9	10	11
Ansar & VDP	7	8	9	6	7	7	7	8	7	7	7
Bangladesh Army	4	2	1	1	1	3	3	2	3	3	3
Bangladesh Police	8	6	4	5	4	5	5	4	4	4	4
BKSP FC	2	5	7	8	8	8	6	6	6	6	6
Dhaka Rangers	11	9	8	9	9	6	8	9	9	9	8
Farashganj SC	1	1	2	2	2	2	2	3	2	2	2
Kacharirara Akadas	9	11	11	11	11	11	11	11	11	11	11
Nasrin SC	10	10	10	10	10	10	10	10	10	10	10
Rajshahi Stars	6	4	3	3	3	1	1	1	1	1	1
Siraj Srity	3	3	6	7	6	9	9	7	8	8	9
Suddopuskorini Jubo	5	7	5	4	5	4	4	5	5	5	5

Leader & Champion
Runner Up

Source: Sofascore

== Season statistics ==
=== Scoring ===
- First goal of the season:
  Tannima Biswas (Bangladesh Army FC) against (Bangladesh Police FC) (29 December 2025)

=== Goalscorers ===
There have been 415 goals scored in 55 matches, for an average of 7.55 goals per match.

30 goals

- (Bangladesh) Alpi Akter (Rajshahi Stars)

26 goals

- (Bangladesh) Shamsunnahar Jr. (Farashganj)

20 goals

- Mosammat Sultana (Bangladesh Army FC)

16 goals

- Unnoti Khatun (Bangladesh Army FC)

14 goals

- (Bangladesh) Maria Manda (Farashganj)

13 goals

- (Bangladesh) Mst. Sagorika (Police FC)

12 goals

- (Bangladesh) Sauravi Akanda Prity (Rajshahi Stars)
- (Bangladesh) Umehla Marma (Ansar & VDP Football Club)

11 goals

- (Bangladesh) Tohura Khatun (Farashganj)
- Tannima Biswas (Bangladesh Army FC)
- (Bangladesh) Ritu Porna Chakma (Rajshahi Stars)
- (Bangladesh) Shaheda Akter Ripa (Rajshahi Stars)

10 goals

- (Bangladesh) Kumari Payel Rani (Saddapuskuruni Jubo SC)
- (Bangladesh) Jannatul Ferdous Jhinuk (Saddapuskuruni Jubo SC)
- (Bangladesh) Airin Khatun (Police FC)

9 goals

- (Bangladesh) Mamoni Chakma (Ansar & VDP Football Club)
- (Nepal) Dipa Shahi (Rajshahi Stars)

7 goals

- (Bangladesh) Reya (BKSP Football Club)
- (Bangladesh) Popi Rani (Nasrin Sports Academy)
- (Bangladesh) Sanjida Akter (Police FC)

6 goals

- (Bangladesh) Shamsunnahar (Farashganj SC)
- (Bangladesh) Mst Runa Akter (BKSP Football Club)

5 goals

- Most Bristy Akter (Bangladesh Army FC)
- (Bangladesh) Fatema Akter (BKSP Football Club)
- (Bangladesh) Monika Chakma (Farashganj)
- (Bangladesh) Shila Akter (Saddapuskuruni Jubo SC)
- (Bangladesh) Mst Mira Khatun (BKSP Football Club)
- (Bangladesh) Rumi Hasda (Dhaka Rangers FC)

4 goals

- (Bangladesh) Mst Reshme Akther (Rajshahi Stars)
- Mst Joynob Bibi Rita (Bangladesh Army FC)
- (Bangladesh) Mst. Surma Jannat (Police FC)
- (Bangladesh) Mst Monki Akhter (Rajshahi Stars)

3 goals

- (Bangladesh) Ratna Roy (Dhaka Rangers FC)
- (Bangladesh) Munmun Akter (Ansar & VDP Football Club)
- (Bangladesh) Sabina Akter Rubi (Police FC)
- (Bangladesh) Mst Mim Islam (Saddapuskuruni Jubo SC)
- (Bangladesh) Asma Khatun (Nasrin Sports Academy)
- Arpita Biswas Arpita (Bangladesh Army FC)
- Shika Akter (Bangladesh Army FC)
- (Bangladesh) Soma Rani (Siraj Srity Songsod)
- (Bangladesh) Umma Kulsum (BKSP Football Club)
- Mst Halima Akter (Bangladesh Army FC)
- (Bangladesh) Most Taspia Alter Tisha (Siraj Srity Songsod)
- (Bangladesh) Soheli Sharmin (Kacharirara Akadas)

2 goals

- (Bangladesh) Rozana Bintyrezvi (Police FC)
- (Bangladesh) Sabina Akter Ruby (Police FC)
- (Bangladesh) Afeida Khandaker (Rajshahi Stars)
- (Bangladesh) Bipasha Akter Trisha (Farashganj)
- (Nepal) Puja Rana Magar (Farashganj SC)
- (Bangladesh) Anamika Tripura (Farashganj)
- (Bangladesh) Sapna Rani (Rajshahi Stars)
- (Bangladesh) Puja Das (Rajshahi Stars)
- (Bangladesh) Protima Munda (BKSP Football Club)
- (Bangladesh) Elamoni Akhter Eila (Police FC)
- (Bangladesh) Sinha Ayat (Saddapuskuruni Jubo SC)
- (Bangladesh) Purnima Marma (Ansar & VDP Football Club)
- (Bangladesh) Kalpana Akter (Dhaka Rangers FC)
- (Bangladesh) Mst Mimi Khatun (Dhaka Rangers FC)

1 goal

- Eite Akter (Bangladesh Army FC)
- (Bangladesh) Sree Moti Trishna Rani (Rajshahi Stars)
- (Bangladesh) Tina (Siraj Srity Songsod)
- (Bangladesh) Bithi (Siraj Srity Songsod)
- (Bangladesh) Airin Khatun (BKSP Football Club)
- (Bangladesh) Almina (BKSP Football Club)
- (Bangladesh) Ayonto Bala Mahato (BKSP Football Club)
- (Bangladesh) Puja Chakma (BKSP Football Club)
- (Bangladesh) Suichingma Marma (Ansar & VDP Football Club)
- (Bangladesh) Souravi Rani (Ansar & VDP Football Club)
- (Bangladesh) Kranuching Marma (Ansar & VDP Football Club)
- (Bangladesh) Munni Khatun (Ansar & VDP Football Club)
- (Bangladesh) Lucky Sawtal (Ansar & VDP Football Club)
- (Bangladesh) Mst Anonna Khanom (Saddapuskuruni Jubo SC)
- (Bangladesh) Hoymonti Sukla Khalko (Saddapuskuruni Jubo SC)
- (Bangladesh) Most Ruma Akter Ote (Saddapuskuruni Jubo SC)
- Sree Shanti Mardi (Bangladesh Army FC)
- (Bangladesh) Kohati Kisku (Police FC)
- (Bangladesh) Marufa Akter (Police FC)
- (Bangladesh) Juma (Police FC)
- (Bangladesh) Prity Prity (Farashganj)
- (Bangladesh) Mossamat Nargis Khatun (Rajshahi Stars)
- (Nepal) Samiksha Ghimire (Farashganj)
- (Nepal) Bimala BK (Rajshahi Stars)
- (Bangladesh) Suniya Akther Sati (Dhaka Rangers FC)
- (Bangladesh) Rupali Ray Rupa (Dhaka Rangers FC)
- (Bangladesh) Sree Monira Soren (Dhaka Rangers FC)
- (Bangladesh) Most Mousumi Alter (Dhaka Rangers FC)
- (Bangladesh) Mst Soma Akter (Nasrin Sports Academy)
- (Bangladesh) Kobita Rani (BKSP Football Club)
- (Bangladesh) Sumita Rani (Siraj Srity Songsod)
- (Bangladesh) Soma Rani (Siraj Srity Songsod)
- (Bangladesh) Sanjida Akter (Siraj Srity Songsod)
- (Bangladesh) Puja Rani (Nasrin Sports Academy)
- (Bangladesh) Shekh Samia Akter (Kacharirara Akadas)

Source: Sofascore

=== Hat-tricks ===
† Bold Club indicates winner of the match

As of 13 February 2026

Player	For	Against	Result	Date	Ref
(Bangladesh) Shamsunnahar Jr.^{4}	Farashganj SC	Dhaka Rangers FC	10–0	1 January 2026	
(Bangladesh) Tohura Khatun^{4}	Farashganj SC	Dhaka Rangers FC	10–0	1 January 2026	
(Nepal) Dipa Shahi^{4}	Rajshahi Stars FC	Nasrin Sports Academy	12–0	3 January 2026	
(Bangladesh) Shamsunnahar Jr.^{6}	Farashganj SC	Kachari Para Akadas	23–0	4 January 2026	
(Bangladesh) Maria Manda^{6}	Farashganj SC	Kachari Para Akadas	23–0	4 January 2026	
(Bangladesh) Tohura Khatun	Farashganj SC	Kachari Para Akadas	23–0	4 January 2026	
(Bangladesh) Mst. Sagorika^{5}	Bangladesh Police FC Women	Nasrin Sports Academy	15–0	7 January 2026	
(Bangladesh) Mst Mim Islam	Suddopuskorini Jubo Sporting Club	Kachari Para Akadas Unnayan Shangstha	9–0	7 January 2026	
(Bangladesh) Kumari Payel Rani	Suddopuskorini Jubo Sporting Club	Kachari Para Akadas Unnayan Shangstha	9–0	7 January 2026	
(Bangladesh) Alpi Akter	Rajshahi Stars FC	BKSP FC Women	4–0	7 January 2026	
(Bangladesh) Umehla Marma^{5}	Ansar & VDP Football Club	Nasrin Sports Academy	7–1	10 January 2026	
(Bangladesh) Unnoti Khatun^{6}	Bangladesh Army FC	Kachari Para Akadas Unnayan Shangstha	18–0	10 January 2026	
(Bangladesh) Mosamamt Sultana^{4}	Bangladesh Army FC	Kachari Para Akadas Unnayan Shangstha	18–0	10 January 2026	
(Bangladesh) Tannima Biswas	Bangladesh Army FC	Kachari Para Akadas Unnayan Shangstha	18–0	10 January 2026	
(Bangladesh) Jannatul Ferdous Jhinuk	Suddopuskorini Jubo SC	Dhaka Rangers FC	7–1	10 January 2026	
(Bangladesh) Shamsunnahar Jr.^{4}	Farashganj SC	Siraj Srity Songsod	9–0	10 January 2026	
(Bangladesh) Maria Manda	Farashganj SC	Siraj Srity Songsod	9–0	10 January 2026	
(Bangladesh) Popi Rani^{5}	Nasrin Sports Academy	Kachari Para Akadas Unnayan Shangstha	9–1	13 January 2026	
(Bangladesh) Asma Khatun	Nasrin Sports Academy	Kachari Para Akadas Unnayan Shangstha	9–1	13 January 2026	
(Bangladesh) Unnoti Khatun^{4}	Bangladesh Army FC	Dhaka Rangers FC	7–0	13 January 2026	
(Bangladesh) Shamsunnahar Jr.^{4}	Farashganj SC	Suddopuskorini Jubo Sporting Club	7–0	4 January 2026	
(Bangladesh) Kumari Payel Rani	Suddopuskorini Jubo Sporting Club	Siraj Srity Songsod	5–0	17 January 2026	
(Bangladesh) Alpi Akter^{7}	Rajshahi Stars FC	Kachari Para Akadas Unnayan Shangstha	24–0	17 January 2026	
(Bangladesh) Sauravi Akanda Prity^{7}	Rajshahi Stars FC	Kachari Para Akadas Unnayan Shangstha	24–0	17 January 2026	
(Bangladesh) Shaheda Akter Ripa^{4}	Rajshahi Stars FC	Kachari Para Akadas Unnayan Shangstha	24–0	17 January 2026	
(Bangladesh) Mst Reshme Akter	Rajshahi Stars FC	Kachari Para Akadas Unnayan Shangstha	24–0	17 January 2026	
(Bangladesh) Shamsunnahar Jr.	Farashganj SC	Nasrin Sports Academy	11–0	20 January 2026	
(Bangladesh) Shika Akter	Bangladesh Army FC	Siraj Srity Songsod	4–0	20 January 2026	
(Bangladesh) Fatema Akter	BKSP Women FC	Kachari Para Akadas Unnayan Shangstha	9–0	20 January 2026	
(Bangladesh) Mst Runa Akter	BKSP Women FC	Kachari Para Akadas Unnayan Shangstha	9–0	20 January 2026	
(Bangladesh) Soma Rani	Siraj Srity Songsod	Nasrin Sports Academy	5–0	24 January 2026	
(Bangladesh) Unnoti Khatun^{4}	Bangladesh Army FC	Suddopuskorini Jubo Sporting Club	9–0	24 January 2026	
(Bangladesh) Mst Runa Akter	BKSP Women FC	Dhaka Rangers FC Women	6–0	24 January 2026	
(Bangladesh) Kumari Payel Rani	Suddopuskorini Jubo Sporting Club	Nasrin Sports Academy	9–2	27 January 2026	
(Bangladesh) Most Shila Akter	Suddopuskorini Jubo Sporting Club	Nasrin Sports Academy	9–2	27 January 2026	
(Bangladesh) Alpi Akter^{5}	Rajshahi Stars FC	Siraj Srity Songsod	13–0	27 January 2026	
(Bangladesh) Ritu Porna Chakma	Rajshahi Stars FC	Siraj Srity Songsod	13–0	27 January 2026	
(Bangladesh) Mst Surma Jannat	Bangladesh Police FC	Dhaka Rangers FC Women	9–0	27 January 2026	
(Bangladesh) Umehla Marma	Ansar & VDP Football Club	Kachari Para Akadas Unnayan Shangstha	12–0	27 January 2026	
(Bangladesh) Mosamamt Sultana^{9}	Bangladesh Army FC	Nasrin Sports Academy	18–0	10 February 2026	
(Bangladesh) Most Brishty Akter	Bangladesh Army FC	Nasrin Sports Academy	18–0	10 February 2026	
(Bangladesh) Ratna Ray	Dhaka Rangers FC	Kachari Para Akadas Unnayan Shangstha	10–2	13 February 2026	

=== Own goals ===
† Bold Club indicates winner of the match.

As of 13 February 2026

Player	Club	Opponent	Result	Date
(Bangladesh) Soheli Sharmin	Kacharirara Akadas	Siraj Srity Songsod	1–5	1 January 2026

== Player of the match ==
† Bold club indicates winner of the match.

As of 13 February 2026

Match No	Club	Player	Opponents	Round
1	Bangladesh Army FC	(Bangladesh) Tannima Biswas	Bangladesh Police FC	1
2	BKSP FC Women	(Bangladesh) Fatema Akter	Nasrin Sports Academy	1
3	Saddapuskuruni Jubo SC	(Bangladesh) Jannatul Ferdous Jhinuk	Ansar & VDP Football Club	1
4	Siraj Srity Songsod	(Bangladesh) Taspia Akter Tisha	Kacharirara Akadas	1
5	Farashganj SC Women	(Bangladesh) Shamsunnahar Jr. Tohura Khatun	Dhaka Rangers FC	1
6	Rajshahi Stars FC	(Nepal) Dipa Shahi	Nasrin Sports Academy	2
7	Bangladesh Army FC	(Bangladesh) Mst Halima Akter	BKSP Women FC	2
8	Bangladesh Police FC	(Bangladesh) Sanjida Akter	Suddopuskorini Jubo SC	2
9	Siraj Srity Songsod	(Bangladesh) Tanzina Akter Tisha	Ansar & VDP FC Women	2
10	Farashganj SC	(Bangladesh) Shamsunnahar Jr.	Kacharirara Akadas	2
11	Bangladesh Police FC	(Bangladesh) Mst. Sagorika	Nasrin Sports Academy	3
12	Bangladesh Army FC	(Bangladesh) Tannima Biswas	Ansar & VDP Football Club	3
13	Suddopuskorini Jubo SC	(Bangladesh) Mst Annonna Khanam	Kacharirara Akadas	3
14	Dhaka Rangers FC	(Bangladesh) Kalpana Akter	Siraj Srity Songsod	3
15	Rajshahi Stars FC	(Bangladesh) Alpi Akter	BKSP Women FC	3
16	Ansar & VDP FC Women	(Bangladesh) Umehla Marma	Nasrin Sports Academy	4
17	Bangladesh Army FC	(Bangladesh) Unnoti Khatun	Kacharirara Akadas	4
18	Saddapuskuruni Jubo SC	(Bangladesh) Jannatul Ferdous Jhinuk	Dhaka Rangers FC	4
19	Farashganj SC	(Bangladesh) Shamsunnahar Jr.	Siraj Srity Songsod	4
20	Rajshahi Stars FC	(Bangladesh) Ritu Porna Chakma	Bangladesh Police FC	4
21	Nasrin Sports Academy	(Bangladesh) Popi Akter	Kacharirara Akadas	5
22	Bangladesh Army FC	(Bangladesh) Unnoti Khatun	Dhaka Rangers FC	5
23	Farashganj SC Women	(Bangladesh) Shamsunnahar Jr.	Saddapuskuruni Jubo SC	5
24	Rajshahi Stars FC	(Bangladesh) Ritu Porna Chakma	Ansar & VDP Football Club	5
25	Bangladesh Police FC	(Bangladesh) Airin Khatun	BKSP Women FC	5
26	Dhaka Rangers FC	(Bangladesh) Mst Mimi Khtun	Nasrin Sports Academy	6
27	Farashganj SC	(Bangladesh) Shamsunnahar Jr.	Bangladesh Army FC	6
28	Saddapuskuruni Jubo SC	(Bangladesh) Kumari Payel Rani	Siraj Srity Songsod	6
29	Rajshahi Stars FC	(Bangladesh) Alpi Akter	Kacharirara Akadas	6
30	BKSP Women FC	(Bangladesh) Tangila Afroz Hira	Ansar & VDP Football Club	6
31	Farashganj SC	(Bangladesh) Maria Manda	Nasrin Sports Academy	7
32	Bangladesh Army FC	(Bangladesh) Shika Akter	Siraj Srity Songsod	7
33	Rajshahi Stars FC	(Nepal) Dipa Shahi	Dhaka Rangers FC Women	7
34	BKSP FC Women	(Bangladesh) Fatema Akter	Kacharirara Akadas	7
35	Ansar & VDP FC Women	(Bangladesh) Umehla Marma	Bangladesh Police FC	7
36	Siraj Srity Songsod	(Bangladesh) Soma Rani	Nasrin Sports Academy	8
37	Bangladesh Army FC	(Bangladesh) Shika Akter	Saddapuskuruni Jubo SC	8
38	Rajshahi Stars FC	(Bangladesh) Alpi Akter	Farashganj SC Women	8
39	BKSP FC Women	(Bangladesh) Mst Runa Akter	Dhaka Rangers FC Women	8
40	Bangladesh Police FC	(Bangladesh) Mst. Sagorika	Kacharirara Akadas	8
41	Saddapuskuruni Jubo SC	(Bangladesh) Sinha Ayat	Nasrin Sports Academy	9
42	Rajshahi Stars FC	(Bangladesh) Alpi Akter	Siraj Srity Songsod	9
43	Farashganj SC	(Bangladesh) Monika Chakma	BKSP FC Women	9
44	Bangladesh Police FC	(Bangladesh) Surma Jannat	Dhaka Rangers FC Women	9
45	Ansar & VDP FC Women	(Bangladesh) Umehla Marma	Kacharirara Akadas	9
46	Bangladesh Army FC; Nasrin Sports Academy	(Bangladesh) Mosamamt Sultana (Bangladesh) Puja Rani	Bangladesh Army FC; Nasrin Sports Academy	10
47	Rajshahi Stars FC	(Bangladesh) Ritu Porna Chakma	Saddapuskuruni Jubo SC	10
48	BKSP FC Women	(Bangladesh) Reya	Siraj Srity Songsod	10
49	Farashganj SC Women	(Bangladesh) Shamsunnahar Jr.	Bangladesh Police FC	10
50	Ansar & VDP FC Women	(Bangladesh) Umehla Marma	Dhaka Rangers FC	10
51	Rajshahi Stars FC	(Bangladesh) Ritu Porna Chakma	Bangladesh Army FC	11
52	Saddapuskuruni Jubo SC	(Bangladesh) Ennima Khanom Richi	BKSP FC Women	11
53	Bangladesh Police FC	(Bangladesh) Marufa Akter	Siraj Srity Songsod	11
54	Farashganj SC Women	(Bangladesh) Tohura Khatun	Ansar & VDP Football Club	11
55	Dhaka Rangers FC Women	(Bangladesh) Ratna Roy	Kacharirara Akadas	11
