= Mohammad Ataur Rahman Bhuiyan (Manik) =

Bangladeshi businessman

Mohammad Ataur Rahman Bhuiyan (Manik) is a Bangladeshi businessman, sports organizer, and politician. He is the chairman of Toma Group, a major Bangladeshi conglomerate. He is the vice-president of the Bangladesh Football Federation, the associate of FIFA in Bangladesh. He is the vice-president of the Noakhali District unit of Awami League.

Bhuiyan is the chairman of Bangladesh Football Federation Development Committee. He is the convenor of BFF Professional League Management Committee's sub committee. He signed an agreement with InterContinental Dhaka to make it the official hosting partner of Bangladesh Football Federation.

== Career ==
Bhuiyan established Toma Group in 1996 with the start of Toma Construction & Co. Limited. Bhuiyan is the chairman of Toma Group. He signed an agreement with Dutch-Bangla Bank Limited in April 2014 which would allow the customers of the bank to pay for Toma taxies with their cards. His Toma Group is one of two exclusive contractors of Bangladesh Railway, the other is Max Group. Toma Construction was building Moghbazar-Mouchak Flyover when a pedestrian died in an accident despite which the company failed to improve on safety.

Bhuiyan is the vice-president of the Noakhali District unit of Awami League. His appointment to vice-president was criticised by Abdul Quader Mirza, brother of Awami League General Secretary, Obaidul Quader. Mirza accused Bhuiyan of being close to Hawa Bhaban, the political office of Bangladesh Nationalist Party chairperson, Khaleda Zia. Mirza also criticised Bhuiyan's fellow vice-president of Noakhali District unit of Awami League, Zabed Minhaj Ahmed Zabed who is the younger brother of former Bangladesh Army chief Moeen U Ahmed for not having enough links to Awami League.

On 11 December 2019, Bhuiyan sued MG Kibria Chowdhury and another journalist of Dainik Jatio Arthonitee who alleged he had links to Bangladesh Jamaat-e-Islami and Bangladesh Islami Chhatra Shibir in their newspaper under the Digital Security Act. The journalists were arrested on 6 January 2020.

Bhuiyan bought nomination papers for vice-president of the Bangladesh Football Federation on 8 September 2020. He was elected in October under the Samonnya Parishad of president Kazi Salahuddin. The Bangladesh Football Federation was founded on 15 July 1972 by Muhammad Yusuf Ali, the country's former minister for education, culture and sport. In December 2021, he accorded a reception to the Swadhin Bangla' Football team.
