= Kalsindur Government Primary School =

Location
- Kalsindur village, Dhobaura Upazila, Mymensingh District; Bangladesh
- Coordinates: 25°07′55″N 90°33′56″E

Information
- Type: Public
- Head teacher: Minati Rani Sheel
- Gender: Boys (6 to 11); Girls (6 to 11)
- Age range: 6–11

Kalsindur Government Primary School is a government-funded primary school situated in Kalsindur village of Dhobaura Upazila in Mymensingh District, Bangladesh. Boys and girls ages at the range of 6–11 years old study there from class I-V.

== Sports ==
The school has produced a number of women's footballers who represented Bangladesh from age group football to senior football at international levels.

== Notable alumni ==
- Maria Manda
- Sheuli Azim
- Sanjida Akhter
- Tohura Khatun
- Shamsunnahar
