= Subroto Cup =

- Organiser(s): Air Force Sports Control Board
- Founded: 1960; 66 years ago
- Region: India
- Current champions: Junior: Kerala (Farook HSS, Kozhikode); Sub-Junior: West Bengal (Manik Para VV, Jhargram); Girls Junior: Jharkhand (St. Patrick's, Gumla)
- Most championships: Junior: West Bengal (18 titles); Sub-Junior: Mizoram (5 titles); Girls Junior: Jharkhand (4 titles)
- Broadcaster(s): Prasar Bharati Sports; SportsCast India (YouTube)
- Website: subrotocup.in
- 2026

The Subroto Cup International Football Tournament is an international inter-school football tournament held in New Delhi, India. The tournament, held annually since 1960, is named after the Indian Air Force Air Marshal Subroto Mukerjee. It is the oldest national school football tournament in India and was instituted to promote and encourage the sport at the grassroots level in the country. Students from different countries across Asia participate in this tournament, making it one of the more noteworthy school-level football competitions.

== History ==
Subroto Mukerjee conceived the idea in 1958 when he was the Chief of the Air Staff. Subroto Mukerjee Sports Education Society was formed in 1960.

== Organisation ==
The Subroto Cup is conducted by the Indian Air Force, with the help of Ministry of Youth Affairs & Sports.

== Tournament structure ==
The current tournament structure consists of the preliminary inter-school tournaments at different divisional levels culminating in the inter-school finals at the state level. The winners then participate in the main national tournament.

Subroto Cup Football Tournament
Round	Level	Tournament
Main	National	Subroto Cup
Preliminary	State	State Subroto Cup
Preliminary	Division	Division Subroto Cup
Preliminary	District	District Subroto Cup
Preliminary	Sub-Division	Sub-Division Subroto Cup

== Venues ==
The venues for the tournament held at New Delhi:

- Ambedkar Stadium
- Jawaharlal Nehru Stadium
- Tejas Football Ground (Race Course)
- Subroto Park

== International participation ==
School teams from numerous countries have played in the tournament, with the first team reaching the final in 1993 being the Special Sports School from Uzbekistan. Since then many schools from foreign countries take part regularly, such as Brazil, Indonesia, Afghanistan, Nepal, Ukraine, Sri Lanka, Bangladesh, Bhutan etc.

In the 2015 Championship, for the first time teams of boys and girls came from Afghanistan for the tournament. Brazilian legend and football's elder statesman Pele came to India after a gap of 38 years to attend the final of the 56th edition of the Subroto Cup as the chief guest. In 2016, Rivaldo and Roberto Carlos were the chief guests at the 57th edition.

== Results ==
=== Junior (U–17) ===
The following is the list of winners and runners-up:

Year	Winners	Score	Runners-Up	Ref
1960	DAV HSS Daryaganj, Delhi and DAV HSS Chitragupta Road, New Delhi	0–0	–	
1961	Rani Rashmani High School, Calcutta, West Bengal	2–0	Gorkha Military HSS, Dehra Dun, Uttar Pradesh (now Uttarakhand)	
1962	The tournament was not held due to Indo-China War			
1963	Batanagar High School, Calcutta, West Bengal	4–2	Rani Rashmani High School, Calcutta, West Bengal	
1964	Gorkha Military HSS, Dehra Dun, Uttar Pradesh (now Uttarakhand)	1–0	Anjuman-i-Islam, Bombay, Maharashtra	
1965	Shri KAB Vidyalaya, Hazaribagh, Bihar (now Jharkhand) and Gorkha Military HSS, Dehra Dun, Uttar Pradesh (now Uttarakhand)	0–0	–	
1966	Government HSS, Car Nicobar, Andaman & Nicobar Islands	2–0	S.S.S., Jalandhar, Punjab	
1967	Government HSS, Car Nicobar, Andaman & Nicobar Islands	1–0	Government HS, Kohima, Nagaland	
1968	PKA Institution, Calcutta, West Bengal	1–0	Government HS, Mokokchung, Nagaland	
1969	Gorkha Boys Company, Dehra Dun, Uttar Pradesh (now Uttarakhand) and Government HSS, Car Nicobar, Andaman & Nicobar Islands	1–1	–	
1970	Gorkha Boys Company, Dehra Dun, Uttar Pradesh (now Uttarakhand)	2–1	Gorkha Military HSS, Dehra Dun, Uttar Pradesh (now Uttarakhand)	
1971	The tournament was not held due to Indo-Pak War			
1972	PKA Institution, Calcutta, West Bengal	2–0	Gorkha Boys Company, Dehra Dun, Uttar Pradesh (now Uttarakhand)	
1973	Sir G.D. Patliputra HS, Patna, Bihar	2–0	Tombisana HS, Imphal, Manipur	
1974	Sir G.D. Patliputra HS, Patna, Bihar and PKA Institution, Calcutta, West Bengal	0–0	–	
1975	PKA Institution, Calcutta, West Bengal	1–0	Sir G.D. Patliputra HS, Patna, Bihar	
1976	Netaji Sikshayatan, Agarpara, West Bengal	1–0	PKA Institution, Calcutta, West Bengal	
1977	Adarsh Seva Vidyalaya, Varanasi, Uttar Pradesh	1–0	Government HSS, Car Nicobar, Andaman and Nicobar Islands	
1978	St. Anthony's HSS, Shillong, Meghalaya	1–0	Madhyamgram High School, West Bengal	
1979	Ibemcha HSS, Manipur	1–0	Government HSS, Kokrajhar. Assam	
1980	Ibemcha HSS, Manipur and Government High School, Dimapur, Nagaland	0–0	–	
1981	Madhyamgram High School, West Bengal	2–1	Government High School, Dimapur, Nagaland	
1982	Madhyamgram High School, West Bengal	1–0	St. Ignatius High School, Gumla, Ranchi, Bihar (now Jharkhand)	
1983	Madhyamgram High School, West Bengal	2–1	Aizawl High School, Mizoram	
1984	Government HSS, Car Nicobar, Andaman and Nicobar Islands	1–0	Government High School, Dimapur, Nagaland	
1985	Madhyamgram High School, West Bengal	1–0	Government High School, Dimapur, Nagaland	
1986	Government HSS, Kokrajhar, Assam	2–0	R.K. Mission School, Arunachal Pradesh	
1987	No.1 Goa Naval Unit NCC, Panaji, Goa	1–0	No.6, Bengal Battalion Bangaon, NCC Kalyani, West Bengal	
1988	Madhyamgram High School, West Bengal	4–0	R.K. Mission School, Arunachal Pradesh	
1989	Adarsh Seva Vidyalaya, Varanasi, Uttar Pradesh	0–0 (2–0 p)	Madhyamgram High School, West Bengal	
1990	St. Ignatius High School, Gumla, Ranchi, Bihar (now Jharkhand)	0–4 (6–4 p)	Arya Vidyapith HSS, Guwahati, Assam	
1991	Sports College (now Guru Gobind Singh Sports College), Lucknow, Uttar Pradesh	3–0	Bidhan Nagar Government High School, Calcutta, West Bengal	
1992	Arya Vidyapith HSS, Guwahati, Assam	2–1	Christ College, Cuttack, Orissa	
1993	St. Ignatius High School, Gumla, Ranchi, Bihar (now Jharkhand)	0–0 (4–3 p)	Special Sports School, Tashkent, Uzbekistan	
1994	Sports College (now Guru Gobind Singh Sports College), Lucknow, Uttar Pradesh	0–0 (5–4 p)	Bidhan Nagar Government High School, Calcutta, West Bengal	
1995	Madhyamgram High School, West Bengal	3–0	Sports College (now Guru Gobind Singh Sports College), Lucknow, Uttar Pradesh	
1996	Madhyamgram High School, West Bengal	0–0 (3–2 p)	Ort Netanya, Israel	
1997	Sukantanagar Vidyaniketan, Calcutta, West Bengal	1–0	Central High School, Imphal, Manipur	
1998	Mamata Modern High School, Delhi	1–1 (5–3 p)	Christ College, Cuttack, Orissa	
1999	Government Boys High School, Shillong, Meghalaya	1–1 (6–5 p)	Sukantanagar Vidyaniketan, Calcutta, West Bengal	
2000	Rangadih High School, Purulia, West Bengal	1–0	Army Boys Company, Danapur, Bihar	
2001	Government Boys High School, Mizoram	2–0	Army Boys, Bangalore, Karnataka	
2002	Bokaro Secondary School, Sector IV-E, Jharkhand	1–0	Apex Public School, Sant Nagar, Delhi	
2003	Oxford High School, Mizoram	1–1 (4–2 p)	Government HSS, Car Nicobar, Andaman and Nicobar Islands	
2004	BSL IV E High School, Bokaro, Jharkhand	1–1, 1–0 (a.e.t.)	Government Senior Secondary School, Dimapur, Nagaland	
2005	Nobel Academy, Kathmandu, Nepal	1–1, 4–4 (2–1 p)	Government Model High School, Chandigarh	
2006	Nobel Academy, Kathmandu, Nepal	5–0	Higher Secondary School, Agartala, Tripura	
2007	National Cadet Corps, Aizawl, Mizoram	1–0	Sagarbhanga High School, Durgapur, West Bengal	
2008	Boys Sports Company, Bangalore, Karnataka	2–1	Govt. HS School, Mizoram	
2009	SAI Eastern Centre, Kolkata, West Bengal	1–0	Government Central School, Mizoram	
2010	Government Mamit High School, Mizoram	1–0	Army Boys, Danapur, Bihar	
2011	National Cadet Corps, West Bengal and Sikkim	2–1	Mynkhen Christian Higher Secondary School, Meghalaya	
2012	Dynamo Kyiv, Ukraine	5–2	MSP Higher Secondary School, Malappuram, Kerala	
2013	OM Roy Memorial, Shillong, Meghalaya	4–0	Magurmari High School, Kokrajhar, Assam	
2014	Colegio Estadul Santo Antonio, Brazil	2–2 (5–4 p)	MSP Higher Secondary School, Malappuram, Kerala	
2015	AIFF Academy	4–1	Little Angels Paradise Secondary School, Manipur	
2016	Atlético Paranaense, Brazil	1–0	Army Boys, Bangalore, Karnataka	
2017	St. Columbus Collegiate School, Bokaro, Jharkhand	2–1	Army Boys Company	
2018	Bangladesh Krira Shikkha Protishtan, Dhaka, Bangladesh	1–0	Amini School, Afghanistan	
2019	Hopewell Elias Higher Secondary School, Shillong, Meghalaya	1–0	Bangladesh Krira Shikkha Protishtan, Dhaka, Bangladesh	
2022	Pilgrim Higher Secondary School, Dimapur, Nagaland	1–0	Government Model Higher Secondary School, Chandigarh	
2023	Government Model Higher Secondary School, Chandigarh	0–0 (5–3 p)	Amenity Public School, Rudrapur, Uttarakhand	
2024	T.G. English School, Bishnupur, Manipur	1–1 (4–3 p)	Myngken Christian HS School, Ri-Bhoi, Meghalaya	
2025	Farook Higher Secondary School, Kozhikode, Kerala	2–0	Amenity Public School, Rudrapur, Uttarakhand	

=== Sub–Junior (U–15) ===
At the request of the School Games Federation of India, the Subroto Cup organisers started a sub-junior (11-14 Years) football tournament from 1998. Sixteens teams participated in the inaugural tournament, while more schools took part in the following years. Since 2000, the fairplay trophy for the sub-junior group has been named in the memory of late Lieutenant Sandeep Loomba, who died in a mountaineering expedition at Abi Gamin peak. Fairplay trophy for the junior group, medals and certificates for both the age groups, are provided by the Subroto Society.

The following is the list of winners and runners-up:

Year	Winners	Score	Runners-Up	Ref
1998	Bokaro Ispat Vidyalaya, Bokaro Steel City, Bihar (now Jharkhand)	0–0 (a.e.t.) (5–4 p)	Electric Veng, Middle School, Aizawl, Mizoram	
1999	ANFA Academy, Lalitpur, Nepal	3–0	Shri Kamlakar Chaubey Adarsh Seva Vidhyalaya, Varanasi, Uttar Pradesh	
2000	Bokaro Ispat Vidyalaya, Bokaro Steel City, Jharkhand	1–0	Galaxy Public School, Kathmandu, Nepal	
2001	St John Bosco Boys Ups School, Sohra, Meghalaya	1–0	St Ignatius' High School, Gumla, Jharkhand	
2002	Holy Heart School, Aizawl, Mizoram	2–1	Namchi Sports Hostel, Namchi, Sikkim	
2003	Holy Heart School, Aizawl, Mizoram	1–0	Bangladesh Krira Shikkha Protishtan, Dhaka, Bangladesh	
2004	Gyanodaya Bal Batika School, Lalitpur, Nepal	4–0	Air Force Bal Bharati School, New Delhi, Delhi	
2005	Army Public School Shillong, Shillong, Meghalaya	2–2 (a.e.t.) (5–3 p)	Nobel Academy of Higher Secondary School, Kathmandu, Nepal	
2006	Allied Co-Education School, Kathmandu, Nepal	1–0	Government Model School, Chandigarh	
2007	SAI Netaji Subhas Regional Centre, Lucknow, Uttar Pradesh	1–1 (a.e.t.) (4–3 p)	Greenwood School, Dimapur, Nagaland	
2008	Greenwood School, Dimapur, Nagaland	2–0	Bangladesh Krira Shikkha Protishtan, Dhaka, Bangladesh	
2009	Sukantanagar Vidyaniketan, Kolkata, West Bengal	1–0	Charity School, Kohima, Nagaland	
2010	Government Model High School, Chandigarh	1–1 (a.e.t.) (5–3 p)	Hmar Veng High School, Kolasib, Mizoram	
2011	Butwal Elite English School, Butwal, Nepal	1–0	Charity School, Kohima, Nagaland	
2012	Greenwood School, Dimapur, Nagaland	3–1	Kalyangarh Bidyamandir, Kolkata, West Bengal	
2013	Government Chawngfianga Middle School, Mizoram	2–1	Betkuchi High School, Guwahati, Assam	
2014	Greenwood School, Dimapur, Nagaland	0–0 (5–4 p)	Government Model High School, Chandigarh	
2015	Government Chawngfiang Middle School, Mizoram	3–2 (a.e.t.)	Lycée Esteqlal, Kabul, Afghanistan	
2016	Bangladesh Krira Shikkha Protishtan, Dhaka, Bangladesh	0–0 (a.e.t.) (4–2 p)	Government Model High School, Chandigarh	
2017	Astaqlal Kabul, Afghanistan	2–0	Government Model High School, Sector 36, Chandigarh	
2018	Unique Model Academy, Manipur	2–0	NCC Directorate, Odisha	
2019	Saidan Secondary School, Mizoram	2–0	Unique Model Academy, Manipur	
2022	Heirok Higher Secondary School, Manipur	2–0	Berwa High School, Jharkhand	
2023	Minerva Public School, Mohali, Punjab	1–0	Chawngfianga Middle School, Saidan, Kolasib, Mizoram	
2024	Nongjri Presbyterian Secondary School, Nongjri, Meghalaya	3–0	Major Dhyanchand Sports College, Saifai, Etawah, Uttar Pradesh	
2025	Minerva Public School, Mohali, Punjab	6–0	Vidyanchal International School, Muzaffarpur, Bihar	
2026	Manik Para Vivekanand Vidyapeeth, Jhargram, West Bengal	1–0	Kamrup Metropolitan Senior Secondary School, Sonapur, Assam	

=== Girls Junior (U–17) ===
Year	Winners	Score	Runners-Up	Ref
2012	Oriental English School, Manipur	1–0	Government Mizo High School, Mizoram	
2013	Radha Madhav Sanskrit Vidhyalaya, Nambol, Bishnupur, Manipur	1–1 (6–4 p)	Govt Senior Secondary School, Alakhpura, Bhiwani, Haryana	
2014	Government Girls Senior Secondary School, Hisar, Haryana	3–0	Kiyang Kasiya Memorial Tribal School, Assam	
2015	Girls Very Girls Secondary School, Alakhpura, Haryana	0–0 (5–3 p)	Chanambam Thambou Higher Secondary School, Manipur	
2016	Girls Senior Secondary School, Alakhpura, Haryana	1–0	Sports School, Kohima, Nagaland	
2017	Krida Shiksha Protishtan, Bangladesh	1–0	Government High School, Aizawl, Mizoram	
2018	Krida Shiksha Protishtan, Bangladesh	1–0	St. Joseph's International School, Hisar, Haryana	
2019	Krida Shiksha Protishtan, Bangladesh	4–0	Nilmani English School, Manipur	
2022	St. Patrick's, Gumla, Jharkhand	3–1	Wangoi Higher Secondary School, Imphal, Manipur	
2023	St. Patrick's, Gumla, Jharkhand	3–0	Girls Senior Secondary School, Alakhpura, Bhiwani, Haryana	
2024	Mother International School, Ranchi, Jharkhand	4–1	Krida Shiksha Protishtan, Bangladesh	
2025	Betkuchi High School, Guwahati, Assam	3–1	Nandajhar Adibashi Pashili High School, Uttar Dinajpur, West Bengal	
2026	St. Patrick's, Gumla, Jharkhand	2–0	Springfield HSS, NCC; Aizawl, Mizoram	

== Total titles won ==
=== Junior (U–17) ===
State/Country/Org.	Titles	Last win
West Bengal	18	2011
Uttar Pradesh	8	1994
Bihar	5	1993
Andaman and Nicobar	4	1984
Meghalaya	4	2019
Mizoram	4	2010
Delhi	3	1998
Manipur	3	2024
Jharkhand	3	2017
Nagaland	2	2022
Assam	2	1992
Nepal	2	2006
Brazil	2	2016
Goa	1	1987
Karnataka	1	2008
Sikkim	1	2011
Ukraine	1	2012
AIFF	1	2015
Bangladesh	1	2018
Chandigarh	1	2023
Kerala	1	2025

=== Sub–Junior (U–15) ===
State/Country/Org.	Titles	Last win
Mizoram	5	2019
Nepal	4	2011
Meghalaya	3	2024
Nagaland	3	2014
Manipur	2	2022
Punjab	2	2025
West Bengal	2	2026
Bihar	1	1998
Jharkhand	1	2000
Uttar Pradesh	1	2007
Chandigarh	1	2010
Bangladesh	1	2016
Afghanistan	1	2017

=== Girls Junior (U–17) ===
State/Country/Org.	Titles	Last win
Jharkhand	4	2026
Haryana	3	2016
Bangladesh	3	2019
Manipur	2	2013
Assam	1	2025

== See also ==
- Junior National Football Championship
- Football in India
- Indian football league system
- Youth League
- History of Indian football
- Indian Arrows
- AIFF Elite Academy
