= Toma Group =

Bangladeshi construction company

- Formation: 1996
- Headquarters: Dhaka, Bangladesh
- Region served: Bangladesh
- Official language: Bengali
- Revenue: ▲৳1000 Crore ▲US$120 million (2019)
- Staff: 6000 (2020)
- Website: www.tomagroup.com.bd

Toma Group (Bengali: তমা গ্রুপ) is a Bangladeshi construction conglomerate based in Dhaka which specializes in government contracts. Mohammad Ataur Rahman Bhuiyan (Manik) is the chairperson of Toma Group.

== History ==
Toma Group was established in 1996 with the start of Toma Construction & Co. Limited. Toma Group established Toma Properties Limited in 2006.

In 2014, Toma Group signed an agreement with Bashundhara Group to use only their cement in its construction works.

In July 2020, the Anti-Corruption Commission questioned Toma Construction Limited over the supply of fake N95 respirator masks during the COVID-19 pandemic in Bangladesh.

=== Construction work ===
In 2007, the Public Works Department awarded a contract to Toma Group to build health care facilities, an asthma centre and a diabetic hospital in Bogra District for 110 million taka. The project did not start in 2011 because the Ministry of Health and Family Welfare did not proceed with it.

The Bangladesh High Court issued an arrest warrant against Showeb Chowdhury Tapan, the head of the governing body of Siddheswari Boys School and College, on 6 February 2014, after he rented out the school's playground to Toma Group. They were using the playground to store construction materials for the Moghbazar Flyover. A petition was filed by the president of the Siddheswari Home Owners Association challenging the lease's legality.

A construction worker of Toma Group died while constructing the Mouchak-Moghbazar flyover in March 2017. Bdnews24.com reported that the workers at the construction site lacked adequate safety gear. Bangladesh High Court issued a ruling on a petition filed by Children's Charity Foundation of Bangladesh on behalf of the injured and dead workers, asking Toma Group why it should not be directed to provide 3 and 5 million taka compensation to the two injured and one dead victim.

Cabinet Committee on Public Purchase, chaired by Industries Minister Amir Hossain Amu, awarded Toma Construction a contract to build eight buildings in Uttara Sector-18 for 3.56 billion BDT on 26 March 2015.

=== Taxi service ===
In April 2014, the Toma group launched a taxi service in Dhaka in partnership with Trust Transport Services of the Army Welfare Trust. The taxis were inaugurated by Prime Minister Sheikh Hasina.

Toma Group stopped Taxi services from 1 January 2023, while the Army Welfare Trust wrote the Bangladesh Road Transport Authority claiming the majority of its fleet was out of order.

=== Railway projects ===
Toma Group is one of two exclusive contractors of Bangladesh Railway, the other being Max Group. Toma Group received a 5.5 billion BDT syndicated loan, arranged by United Commercial Bank Limited, to build a Railway Line from Dohazari to Cox's Bazar.

Toma Construction delayed the construction of a culvert in the Hatirjheel project by three months after subcontracting the work in 2011. They had received the contract from Bangladesh Railway. It had received a contract to construct the 27-kilometre Raimoni-Mymensingh road for 2.66 billion taka. It had received the contract in partnership with Shamim Enterprise Limited and China Metallurgical Group Corporation.

On 30 December 2020, the Department of Environment fined Toma Construction 500 million taka for illegally cutting hills in Lohagara Upazila in Chittagong District. The hills were located inside Chunati Wildlife Sanctuary and were cut in October 2020 as part of the construction of Dohazari-Cox's Bazar railway track. The Director of the Department of Environment stated that they intend to file a case with the environmental court over the incident.

=== Post uprising era ===
The company received a significant number of contracts from 2009 to 2024 during the Sheikh Hasina-led Awami League government. The company is owned by Ataur Rahman Bhuiyan. He is the former vice president of the Noakhali District unit of the Awami League. The company was viewed as close to influential Awami League leaders, including Mirza Azam. Bhuiyan contested the 2024 election in Noakhali-2 as an independent candidate but lost.

In 2025, the company owner fled Bangladesh after the corruption of four bridges in Sunamganj. 750-meter Shah Arefin (RA)-Advaita Mahaprabhu Maitree Bridge over the Jadukata River in Sunamganj's Tahirpur upazila was contracted to Toma Construction in late 2018 for around Tk 86 crore. It was supposed to finish by mid-2021, but after seven years, the contractor has largely abandoned the site. In 2026, a large part of the bridge collapsed.

In August 2025, the Cabinet Committee on Financial Affairs, led by Adviser of Finance to the Muhammad Yunus-led interim government, Dr. Salehuddin Ahmed, cancelled the contract awarded to Toma Construction & Co. Ltd for the construction of Pangaon Cargo Terminal and modernization of passenger terminals in Chandpur District and Narayanganj District. The remaining work was given to SSR International Limited, Sheltech-Bangla JV and Chakar Construction-The Builders JV.

== Businesses ==
- Toma Concrete Limited
- Toma Construction
- Toma Properties
