= Shamsunnahar Jr. =

Bangladeshi women's football player (born 2004)

Personal information
- Date of birth: 30 March 2004 (age 22)
- Place of birth: Mymensingh, Bangladesh
- Height: 1.50 m (4 ft 11 in)
- Position: Forward

Team information
- Current team: Farashganj
- Number: 20

Senior career*
Years	Team	Apps	(Gls)
2020–2024	Bashundhara Kings	25	(21)
2025	Royal Thimphu College	6	(1)
2025—	Farashganj	7	(22)

International career^{‡}
2018–2019	Bangladesh U-17	14	(6)
2021–2023	Bangladesh U-20	11	(5)
2020–	Bangladesh	38	(8)
Medal record
Women's football
Representing Bangladesh
SAFF Women's Championship
Winner	2024 Nepal
Winner	2022 Nepal
- * Club domestic league appearances and goals as of 26 January 2026 ‡ National team caps and goals as of 6 June 2026

Shamsunnahar Jr. (Bengali: শামসুন্নাহার জুনিয়র; born 30 March 2004) is a Bangladeshi women's professional footballer who plays as a forward for Farashganj and Bangladesh national team.

== Early career ==
Shamsunnahar first represented her school team in the Bangamata Sheikh Fazilatunnesa Mujib Gold Cup Football Tournament in 2011, where her performances in early school-level competitions began to draw attention. Through consistent participation in grassroots football at the school level, she eventually earned recognition that led to selection in national youth setups.

== Club career ==
=== Bashundhara Kings ===
Shamsunnahar played for Bashundhara Kings Women in the Bangladesh Women's Football League.

=== Royal Thimphu College ===
In July 2025, she joined Bhutan Women's National League club Royal Thimphu College. She made her debut for the club against Ugyen Academy and scored a goal.

=== Farashganj ===
She joined Farashganj in the 2025–26 Bangladesh Women's Football League. She scored four goals in her debut for the club. She became the Most Valuable Player in the season.

== International career ==
Shamsunnahar captained the Bangladesh U-18 team at the 2018 SAFF U-18 Women's Championship and the 2022 SAFF U-18 Women's Championship.

She won the Player of the Tournament award at the 2023 SAFF U-20 Women's Championship.

In 2024, she was named in Bangladesh's squad for the 2024 SAFF Women's Championship, which finished as champions.

== Career statistics ==
=== International ===
As of match played 5 July 2025
Scores and results list Bangladesh's goal tally first, score column indicates score after each Shamsunnahar Jr. goal.

List of international goals scored by Shamsunnahar Jr.
No.	Date	Venue	Opponent	Score	Result	Competition
1	19 September 2022	Dasharath Rangasala, Kathmandu, Nepal	Nepal	1–0	3–1	2022 SAFF Women's Championship
2	4 December 2023	BSSSMK Stadium, Dhaka, Bangladesh	Singapore	8–0	8–0	Friendly
3	20 October 2024	Dasharath Rangasala, Kathmandu, Nepal	Pakistan	1–1	1–1	2024 SAFF Women's Championship
4	3 June 2025	King Abdullah II Stadium, Amman, Jordan	Jordan	1–1	1–1	Friendly
5	29 June 2025	Thuwunna Stadium, Yangon, Myanmar	Bahrain	1–0	7–0	2026 AFC Women's Asian Cup qualification
6	5 July 2025	Thuwunna Stadium, Yangon, Myanmar	Turkmenistan	2–0	7–0	2026 AFC Women's Asian Cup qualification
7	5 July 2025	Thuwunna Stadium, Yangon, Myanmar	Turkmenistan	3–0	7–0	2026 AFC Women's Asian Cup qualification
8	27 October 2025	Chalerm Phrakiat Bang Mod Stadium, Bangkok, Thailand	Thailand	1–2	1–5	Friendly

== Honours ==
Royal Thimphu College

- Bhutan Women's National League: 2025

Bangladesh U20

- SAFF U-20 Women's Championship: 2021, 2024

Bangladesh

- SAFF Women's Championship: 2024

=== Individual ===
- Bangladesh Women's Football League Most Valuable Player: 2025-26
