= Bangladesh Army women's football team =

Bangladeshi association football club

- Full name: Bangladesh Army Football Team Women
- Short name: BAFWT
- Founded: 2023; 3 years ago
- Ground: Various
- Owner: Bangladesh Army
- Head coach: Md Anwar Hossain
- League: Bangladesh Women's Football League
- 2025–26: 3rd of 11

Bangladesh Army Football Team Women (Bengali: বাংলাদেশ সেনাবাহিনী ফুটবল দল নারী) represents the Bangladesh Army in women's association football and competes in the Bangladesh Women's Football League, the premier women's football league in Bangladesh.

== History ==
In an effort to form the Bangladesh Army women's team, women footballers were enlisted in the Bangladesh Army for the first time in 2022. On 19 September 2023, the Bangladesh Army women's team played its first official game, defeating Bangladesh Krira Shikkha Protishtan (BKSP) 2–0.

== Squad ==
As of 29 December 2025

Note: Flags indicate national team as defined under FIFA eligibility rules; some limited exceptions apply. Players may hold more than one non-FIFA nationality.

No.	Pos.	Nation	Player
1	GK	BAN	Owama Marma
2	DF	BAN	Arpita Biswas Arpita
3	DF	BAN	Mst Surovi Akter Afrin
4	DF	BAN	Mst Farjana Akhter Ratna (Captain)
5	DF	BAN	Unnata Khatun
6	DF	BAN	Eity Akhter
7	FW	BAN	Tannima Biswas
8	MF	BAN	Mst Oeyshi Khatun
9	FW	BAN	Most Bristy Akter
10	FW	BAN	Sumaiya Akter Kona
11	FW	BAN	Mosamamt Sultana
12	FW	BAN	Munia Akhter Mumu
13	MF	BAN	Taposi Chisim
14	MF	BAN	Mst Halima Akter
15	MF	BAN	Kanon Rani Bahadur

No.	Pos.	Nation	Player
16	FW	BAN	Mst Momita Khatun
17	MF	BAN	Senari Chakma
19	FW	BAN	Shika Akter
20	FW	BAN	Sri Shanti Mardi
21	FW	BAN	Mst Asha Moni
22	GK	BAN	Mile Akhter
23	GK	BAN	Merry Iris Provence Tripura Norve
24	DF	BAN	Bristy Chakma
25	GK	BAN	Borsha Mistry
28	FW	BAN	Sree Bidisha Rani Bad
30	FW	BAN	Thuiyenu Marma
33	DF	BAN	Mst Joynob Bibi Rita
50	MF	BAN	Thuimaching Marma
55	MF	BAN	Mst Bonna Akter
66	DF	BAN	Provati Basak
75	DF	BAN	Shuly Roy
77	MF	BAN	Mst Ruma Akter
88	DF	BAN	Moni Das
90	MF	BAN	Nusrat Jahan Mitu
99	MF	BAN	Mst Bonna Khatun

== Competitive record ==
As of 13 February 2026

Season	Division	League								League top scorer(s)	
Season	Division	P	W	D	L	GF	GA	Pts	Position	Players	Goals
2023–24	BWFL	8	6	0	2	24	5	18	3	(Bangladesh) Mosammat Sultana	11
2025–26	BWFL	10	8	0	2	68	5	24	3	(Bangladesh) Mosammat Sultana	20

== Head coach's record ==
As of 13 February 2026

Head coach	From	To	P	W	D	L	GF	GA	%W
(Bangladesh) Golam Rabbani Choton	2 April 2024	20 June 2024	8	6	0	2	24	5	75.00
(Bangladesh) Md Anwar Hossain	2 November 2025	Present	10	8	0	2	68	5	80.00

== Club management ==
=== Technical staff (2025) ===
Position	Name
Head coach	(Bangladesh) Md Anwar Hossain
Assistant coach	(Bangladesh) Md Mamun Reza
Team manager	(Bangladesh) Anika Nawar
Assistant manager	(Bangladesh) Uzzal Ritchill
Doctor	(Bangladesh) Naima Binte Karim
Coordinator	(Bangladesh) Asif
Security officer	(Bangladesh) Rika Boral
Physical trainer	(Bangladesh) Tarek
