= Suddopuskorini Jubo Sporting Club =

Bangladeshi association football club

Saddapuskuruni Jubo SC
- Nickname: SJSC
- Founded: 2015
- Ground: Palichara Stadium
- Capacity: 10,000
- President: Md Milon Miah
- Head coach: Md Shamim Khan Miskin
- League: Bangladesh Women's Football League
- 2025–26: BWFL, 5th of 11

Suddopuskorini Jubo Sporting Club (Bengali: সদ্যপুষ্কুরীনি যুব স্পোর্টিং ক্লাব, Bengali pronunciation: [ʃɔddopuʃkuɾini jubo spoɾʈiŋ klab]), commonly known as, Suddopuskorini Jubo, is a Bangladeshi women's professional football club from Rangpur. They participate in the Bangladesh Women's Football League, the women's premier football league in Bangladesh. Suddopuskorini Jubo SC was founded in 2015.

== Current squad ==
As of 1 January 2026

Note: Flags indicate national team as defined under FIFA eligibility rules; some limited exceptions apply. Players may hold more than one non-FIFA nationality.

No.	Pos.	Nation	Player
1	GK	BAN	Ennima Khanam Richi
2	DF	BAN	Most Ruma Akter Ote
3	DF	BAN	Most Mourashi Akter
4	DF	BAN	Modina Islam
5	DF	BAN	Most Akter Nila
6	DF	BAN	Laboni Rani Aporna
7	MF	BAN	Mst Annonna Khanam
8	MF	BAN	Mst Mim Islam
9	FW	BAN	Shila Akter
11	FW	BAN	Jannatul Ferdous Jinuk
12	FW	BAN	Sinha Ayat
13	DF	BAN	Mst Oishi Akther
14	DF	BAN	Priyonti Roy

No.	Pos.	Nation	Player
15	DF	BAN	Most Amika Khatun
16	DF	BAN	Most Moni Aktar
17	FW	BAN	Kumari Payel Rani
18	FW	BAN	Oishi Dey
19	MF	BAN	Hoymonti Sukla Khalko (Captain)
20	FW	BAN	Most Brishty Akther
22	FW	BAN	Most Jannati Aktar Fiya
23	GK	BAN	Sultana Akter
23	GK	BAN	Most Mostarina Maya
24	FW	BAN	Shamina Hasda
25	DF	BAN	Most Marjiya Aktar Zim Moni
29	DF	BAN	Shimla Khatun
30	FW	BAN	Mst Sagorika Parvin

== Competitive record ==
As of 13 February 2026

Season	Division	League								League top scorer(s)	
Season	Division	P	W	D	L	GF	GA	Pts	Position	Players	Goals
2020–21	BWFL	14	1	0	13	14	63	3	8	(Bangladesh) Tonima Biswas	7
2021–22	BWFL	11	4	1	6	17	33	13	8	(Bangladesh) Most Nasrin Begum	6
2023–24	BWFL	8	4	1	3	16	18	13	4	(Bangladesh) Most Shila Alter (Bangladesh) Kakoli Soren	4
2025–26	BWFL	10	5	1	4	33	30	16	5	(Bangladesh) Kumari Payel Rani	10

== Head coach's record ==
As of 13 February 2026

Head coach	From	To	P	W	D	L	GF	GA	%W
(Bangladesh) Md Milon Khan	9 January 2021	30 September 2021	14	1	0	13	14	63	7.14
(Bangladesh) Md Shamim Khan Miskin	20 February 2024	Present	29	13	3	13	66	91	44.83

== Club management ==
=== Technical staff ===
Position	Name
President	(Bangladesh) Md Milon Miah
Head coach	(Bangladesh) Md Shamim Khan Miskin
Assistant coach	(Bangladesh) Runa Akter
Goalkeeping coach	(Bangladesh) Ragib-Al-Anzum Nirob
Team manager	(Bangladesh) Rekha Akter
Assistant manager	(Bangladesh) AKM Aftabuzzaman
Media manager	(Bangladesh) Ehtasamul Haque Sany
Physiotherapist	(Bangladesh) Md Elias Ahammed
Kitman	(Bangladesh) ATM Abu Bin Rahman
Doctor	(Bangladesh) Md Jubaed Karim
Physical trainer	(Bangladesh) Md Ashraful Islam
Message man	(Bangladesh) Md Shamul Islam
