= Rajshahi Stars FC =

Bangladeshi women's association football club

Rajshahi Stars
- Full name: Rajshahi Stars Football Club
- Nickname: RSFC
- Founded: 2025; 1 year ago
- Ground: BSSS Mostafa Kamal Stadium
- Capacity: 25,000
- Owner: Nabil Group of Industries
- Head coach: Mahmuda Sharifa Oditi
- League: Bangladesh Women's Football League
- 2025–26: Champions
- Website: rajshahistarsfc.com
Home colours	Away colours

Rajshahi Stars Football Club (Bengali: রাজশাহী স্টারস ফুটবল ক্লাব), commonly known as Rajshahi Stars, is a women's professional football club based in Rajshahi, that competes in Bangladesh Women's Football League, the top flight women's club football competition in Bangladesh.

== History ==
Rajshahi Stars FC, funded by Nabil Group, was established in 2025. The club assembled a strong squad for the 2025–26 Bangladesh Women's Football League season, featuring players such as Bangladesh national team captain Afeida Khandaker and forward Ritu Porna Chakma.

== Players ==
=== Current squad ===
As of 24 December 2025

Note: Flags indicate national team as defined under FIFA eligibility rules; some limited exceptions apply. Players may hold more than one non-FIFA nationality.

No.	Pos.	Nation	Player
1	GK	BAN	Surodhani Kisku
2	DF	BAN	Sheuli Azim (captain)
3	DF	NEP	Bimala BK
4	DF	BAN	Afeida Khandaker
5	DF	BAN	Mosammat Nargis Khatun
6	DF	BAN	Mst Uzaifa Khatun
7	MF	BAN	Sapna Rani
8	MF	BAN	Sohagi Kiski
9	FW	BAN	Sree Moti Trishna Rani
10	FW	BAN	Alpi Akter
11	FW	BAN	Sauravi Akanda Prity
12	FW	BAN	Hafsa Aktar
13	GK	BAN	Rupna Chakma

No.	Pos.	Nation	Player
14	FW	BAN	Albina Haque
15	MF	BAN	Munki Akhter
16	FW	BAN	Karim Faria Joyeta
17	FW	BAN	Ritu Porna Chakma
19	FW	BAN	Rehena Akter
20	DF	BAN	Puja Das
21	DF	BAN	Nadia Akter Juti
22	GK	BAN	Swarna Rani Mandal
23	FW	BAN	Mst Reshme Akther
24	FW	BAN	Sumi
32	MF	NEP	Dipa Shahi
75	FW	BAN	Shaheda Akter Ripa

== Club management ==
=== Current technical staff ===
Position	Name
Head coach	(Bangladesh) Mahmuda Sharifa Oditi
Assistant coach	(Bangladesh) Surovey Akter Eity (Bangladesh) Mohammad Mamun
Goalkeeping coach	(Bangladesh) Robiul Hasan Khan Mona
Physiotherapist	(Bangladesh) Rebeka Sultan
Team manager	(Bangladesh) Md Musfiqur Rahman

== Head coach's record ==
As of 23 August 2026

Head coach	From	To	P	W	D	L	GF	GA	%W
(Bangladesh) Mahmuda Sharifa Oditi	5 October 2025	Present	10	10	0	0	90	0	100.00
(Bangladesh) Golam Rabbani Choton	1 July 2026	Present	3	1	0	2	9	6	33.33

== Competitive record ==
As of 13 February 2026

Season	Division	League								League top scorer(s)	
Season	Division	P	W	D	L	GF	GA	Pts	Position	Players	Goals
2025–26	BWFL	10	10	0	0	90	0	30	1st	(Bangladesh) Alpi Akter	30

== Honours ==
Type	Competitions	Titles	Seasons
Domestic	BWFL	1	2025–26

== Performance in AFC competitions ==
- AFC Women's Champions League

2026–27: Preliminary stage

Season	Competition	Round	Opponent	Home	Away	Aggregate
2026–27	AFC Women's Champions League	Preliminary stage	(India) East Bengal	0–4		3rd
2026–27	AFC Women's Champions League	Preliminary stage	(Malaysia) Sabah	1–2		3rd
2026–27	AFC Women's Champions League	Preliminary stage	(Guam) Rovers FC	8–0		3rd
