= Farashganj SC Women =

Bangladeshi association football club

- Full name: Farashganj Sporting Club Women
- Short name: FSCW
- Founded: 2010; 16 years ago
- Ground: Bir Sherestha Shaheed Shipahi Mostafa Kamal Stadium
- Capacity: 25,000
- President: Manos Bose Baburam
- Head coach: Khokon Das
- League: Bangladesh Women's Football League
- 2025–26: BWFL, 2nd of 11

Farashganj Sporting Club Women, commonly known as Farashganj SC Women (Bengali: ফরাশগঞ্জ এসসি নারী), is a Bangladeshi women's professional football club from Farashganj, Dhaka. They participate in the Bangladesh Women's Football League, the women's premier football league in Bangladesh.

== History ==
The Farashganj SC Women was founded in 2010. The club played their first game on 16 November 2022 against FC Brahmanbaria in Dhaka which ended in a 0–4 defeat, in the 2021–22 Bangladesh Women's Football League.

They finished as runners-up in the 2025–26 Bangladesh Women's Football League season.

== Current squad ==
As of 30 January 2026

Note: Flags indicate national team as defined under FIFA eligibility rules; some limited exceptions apply. Players may hold more than one non-FIFA nationality.

No.	Pos.	Nation	Player
1	GK	BAN	Yearzan Begum
2	DF	NEP	Puja Rana
3	DF	BAN	Shamsunnahar
4	DF	NEP	Samiksha Ghimire
5	DF	BAN	Antu Dey
6	MF	BAN	Monika Chakma
7	FW	BAN	Protima Rani
8	MF	BAN	Maria Manda (Captain)
9	MF	BAN	Bipasha Akter Trisha
10	FW	BAN	Tohura Khatun
11	FW	BAN	Suma Saddar
12	FW	BAN	Afren Jahan
13	FW	BAN	Sima Rani
14	MF	BAN	Panna Akter
15	MF	BAN	Protima Hasda
16	MF	BAN	Joti Mondol
17	FW	BAN	Anie Khatun
18	DF	BAN	Mst Shefaly

No.	Pos.	Nation	Player
19	MF	BAN	Mukti Rani Das
20	DF	BAN	Shamsunnahar Jr.
21	FW	BAN	Lisha Tripura
22	GK	BAN	Shantona Robidas Shabonti
23	MF	BAN	Punom Rani Biswas
24	DF	BAN	Mst Fareda Khatun
25	DF	BAN	Sumaiya Khatun
26	FW	BAN	Prity Prity
27	FW	BAN	Tanisha Akter Tanni
28	DF	BAN	Painuching Marma
29	FW	BAN	Mst Jerin
30	DF	BAN	Manoching Marma
31	GK	BAN	Resma Akter Rinti
32	FW	BAN	Anamika Tripura
33	DF	BAN	Nadia Afren
34	GK	BAN	Shejuty Islam Smrity
35	DF	BAN	Roni Akhter

== Competitive record ==
As of 27 May 2024

Season	Division	League								League top scorer(s)	
Season	Division	P	W	D	L	GF	GA	Pts	Position	Players	Goals
2021–22	BWFL	11	0	0	11	2	55	0	12	(Bangladesh) Mahlaching Marma Riki (Bangladesh) Srimoti Sornali Terka	1
2023–24	BWFL	8	3	0	5	11	25	9	6	(Bangladesh) Popi Rani	4
2025–26	BWFL	10	9	0	1	70	4	27	2	(Bangladesh) Shamsunnahar Jr.	26

== Head coach's record ==
As of 13 February 2026

Head Coach	From	To	P	W	D	L	GF	GA	%W
(Bangladesh) Khokon Das	5 October 2022	30 June 2024	19	3	0	16	13	80	15.79
(Bangladesh) Abu Ahmed Faysal	10 October 2025	Present	10	9	0	1	70	4	90.00

== Club management ==
=== Technical staff ===
Position	Name
President	(Bangladesh) Manos Bose Baburam
Team manager	(Bangladesh) Khair Uddin Ahmmed Mukul
Assistant manager	(Bangladesh) Mizanur Rahman Bappy
Head coach	(Bangladesh) Khokon Das
Assistant coach	(Bangladesh) Asia Khatun Bithi
Goalkeeper coach	(Bangladesh) Rupa Akter
Masseur	(Bangladesh) Abul Kalam Azad
Physiotherapist	(Bangladesh) Md Sharif
Media manager	(Bangladesh) Rezaur Rahman Sinha
