= Siraj Srity Songsod =

Bangladeshi association football club

- Full name: Siraj Srity Songsod
- Nickname: SSS
- Founded: 1999
- Ground: Bir Sherestha Shaheed Shipahi Mostafa Kamal Stadium
- Capacity: 25,000
- President: Sabbir Ahmmed
- Head coach: Md Shahidul Islam Sourav
- League: Bangladesh Women's Football League
- 2025–26: BWFL, 9th of 11

Siraj Srity Songsod (Bengali: সিরাজ স্মৃতি সংসদ, Bengali pronunciation: [ʃiradʒ srĩti ʃɔŋʃɔd]) is a Bangladeshi women's professional football club from Rajshahi. They participate in the Bangladesh Women's Football League, the women's premier football league in Bangladesh.

== History ==
The Siraj Srity Songsod was founded in 1999. Bangladesh Football Federation (BFF) gave the club permission to participate in the 2021–22 Bangladesh Women's Football League. The club has played their debut game against Jamalpur Kacharipara Akadas on 17 November and won by 4–0.

== Current squad ==
As of 2 January 2026

Note: Flags indicate national team as defined under FIFA eligibility rules; some limited exceptions apply. Players may hold more than one non-FIFA nationality.

No.	Pos.	Nation	Player
1	GK	BAN	Tanzina Akter Tina
2	DF	BAN	Sunita Rani
3	DF	BAN	Mst Khadija Khatun
4	DF	BAN	Rumita Soren
5	DF	BAN	Sadia Akter
6	DF	BAN	Fatema Akter
7	MF	BAN	Puja Roy
8	MF	BAN	Mst Habiba
9	FW	BAN	Chosha Roaja
10	FW	BAN	Mst Nurjahan Akter Moni (Captain)
12	MF	BAN	Soma Rani
13	MF	BAN	Sanjida Akter
14	FW	BAN	Mst Shova Akter Bithi
15	FW	BAN	Most Taspia Akter Tisha
16	MF	BAN	Mst Bithi Khatun
17	FW	BAN	Mst Saleha Khatun
18	MF	BAN	Antika Rani Halder
19	MF	BAN	Zumur Akter

No.	Pos.	Nation	Player
20	DF	BAN	Romana Jannat
21	DF	BAN	Api Mondal
22	GK	BAN	Mis Afroza Akther
23	DF	BAN	Lipika Chowkidar
24	DF	BAN	Sobita Rani Das
26	MF	BAN	Ritu Rani
27	DF	BAN	Tupur Rani
28	MF	BAN	Tisha Akter
29	DF	BAN	Farjana Akter
30	GK	BAN	Mst Jannatul Ferdous Mukta
31	FW	BAN	Bithi Khatun
32	FW	BAN	Hira Khatun
33	MF	BAN	Mst Akhi Akter
34	MF	BAN	Sonia Akter
35	GK	BAN	Sucana Pahan

== Competitive record ==
As of 13 February 2026

Season	Division	League								League top scorer(s)	
Season	Division	P	W	D	L	GF	GA	Pts	Position	Players	Goals
2021–22	BWFL	11	6	1	4	29	15	19	4	(Bangladesh) Trishna Rani	5
2023–24	BWFL	8	3	2	3	16	6	11	4	(Bangladesh) Alpi Akter	11
2025–26	BWFL	10	2	1	7	12	47	7	9	(Bangladesh) Soma Rani (Bangladesh) Most Taspia Akter Tisha	3

== Head coach's record ==
As of 13 February 2026

Head Coach	From	To	P	W	D	L	GF	GA	%W
(Bangladesh) Md Shahiduzzaman Kamal	25 September 2022	30 July 2025	18	9	3	6	45	20	50.00
(Bangladesh) Md Shahidul Islam Sourav	1 December 2025	Present	10	2	1	7	12	47	20.00

== Club management ==
=== Technical staff ===
Position	Name
Head coach	(Bangladesh) Md Shahidul Islam Sourav
Assistant coach	(Bangladesh) Aminul Islam Ripon
Goalkeeping coach	(Bangladesh) Kanai Chandra Das
Team manager	(Bangladesh) Md Harun Or Rashid
Team leader	(Bangladesh) Md Idris Ali
Assistant manager	(Bangladesh) Md Nazrul Islam Niyon
Media officer	(Bangladesh) Alamgir Hossain Alam
Team officials	(Bangladesh) Md Kawsaruzzaman Babu
Physiotherapist	(Bangladesh) Md Momotaz Uddin
Kitman	(Bangladesh) Md Saiful Islam
