= Bangamata U-19 Women's International Gold Cup =

International football tournament of the Bangladesh Football Federation

Bangamata U-19 Women's International Gold Cup বঙ্গমাতা অনূর্ধ্ব-১৯ নারী আন্তর্জাতিক গোল্ডকাপ
- Founded: 3 March 2019; 7 years ago
- Region: International
- Current champions: Bangladesh; Laos (1st title)
- Most championships: Bangladesh; Laos (1 titles)
- 2019 Bangamata U-19 Women's Gold Cup

The Bangamata U-19 Women's International Gold Cup is an international football tournament organised by the Bangladesh Football Federation (BFF) as a tribute to Sheikh Fazilatunnesa Mujib, the wife of Sheikh Mujibur Rahman, the founding father of Bangladesh.

== History ==
The Bangamata U-19 Women's Gold Cup is the youth under 19 Women's national football teams competition in Bangladesh which run under the Bangladesh Football Federation. The tournament was established 2019. The main goal of the tournament is to develop and grow women's national team and age level teams' skill. According to the BFF statement the tournament will be replaced as a national teams tournament instead of Under 19 teams tournament after three completed seasons.

== Tournament summaries ==
| Year | Final | | |
| Year | Winner | Score | Runners-up |
|---|---|---|---|
| 2019; Details | Bangladesh and Laos | Postponed | None/Joint Winners |

== Top goal scorers ==
=== To goalscorers by edition ===
| Year | Country | Player(s) | Goals |
|---|---|---|---|
| 2019 | Laos | Ms Pe Phomphakdy | 8 |
