= Nasrin Sporting Academy =

Nasrin Sports Academy
- Nickname: Nasrin
- Short name: NSA
- Founded: 2000
- Ground: Bir Sherestha Shaheed Shipahi Mostafa Kamal Stadium
- Capacity: 25,000
- President: Md Ataur Rahman Khan
- Head coach: Md Monir Hossain
- League: Bangladesh Women's Football League
- 2025–26: BWFL, 10th of 11
Home colours	Away colours

Nasrin Sports Academy is a Bangladeshi women's professional football club from Dhaka. It was established in 2000 and competes in the Bangladesh Women's Football League. The club participated in the inaugural SAFF Women's Club Championship in 2025.

== Current squad ==
As of 29 December 2025

Note: Flags indicate national team as defined under FIFA eligibility rules; some limited exceptions apply. Players may hold more than one non-FIFA nationality.

No.	Pos.	Nation	Player
1	GK	BAN	Mst Sagorika
2	DF	BAN	Mst Esrat Jahan (Captain)
3	DF	BAN	Eti Rani
4	DF	BAN	Sonia Khatun
5	DF	BAN	Sumi Rani
6	FW	BAN	Muntaha Binte Azim Samia
7	MF	BAN	Nusrati Rahman Oishi
8	MF	BAN	Mst Sumi Khatun
9	FW	BAN	Mst Soma Akter
10	FW	BAN	Popi Rani
11	MF	BAN	Mst Jarmin Akter
13	FW	BAN	Mst Nurjahan Khatun
14	DF	BAN	Mst Ritu Akter Eite
15	MF	BAN	Sargita Rani
16	MF	BAN	Mst Khatiza Akter
17	DF	BAN	Prema

No.	Pos.	Nation	Player
18	MF	BAN	Anzuman Binte Jumur
20	FW	BAN	Sharmin Akter
21	DF	BAN	Lotika Rani Roy
22	GK	BAN	Akhi Soren
23	GK	BAN	Ishita Tripura
24	DF	BAN	Sopna Hasda
25	MF	BAN	Dipaly Ro
26	DF	BAN	Dristy Rani
27	MF	BAN	Sathi Rani
28	DF	BAN	Most Fareda Khatun
29	DF	BAN	Tokkoni
30	GK	BAN	Bristy Roy
32	MF	BAN	Fatema Akter Koli
33	DF	BAN	Meghla Rani
35	DF	BAN	Afrin Akter
46	MF	BAN	Kursia Jannat
50	MF	BAN	Aneesha Progga Huda

== Competitive record ==
As of 13 February 2026

Season	Division	League								League top scorer(s)	
Season	Division	P	W	D	L	GF	GA	Pts	Position	Players	Goals
2019–20	BWFL	12	10	0	2	53	15	30	2	(Bangladesh) Swapna Rani	14
2020–21	BWFL	14	5	1	8	22	52	16	6	(Bangladesh) Mst Shopna Akter	4
2021–22	BWFL	11	4	3	4	18	39	15	6	(Bangladesh) Airin Khatun	8
2023–24	BWFL	8	7	1	0	67	4	22	1	(Bangladesh) Sabina Khatun	17
2025–26	BWFL	10	1	0	9	12	88	3	10	(Bangladesh) Popi Rani	7

== Continental record ==
Win	Draw	Loss

Season	Competition	Round	Club	Result	Position	Top scorer(s)	Goals
2025–26
2025–26	SWCC	Group Stage	(Nepal) APF	0–4	5th in Group stage	(Bangladesh) Sauravi Akanda Prity	1
2025–26	SWCC	Group Stage	(Pakistan) Karachi City	0–0	5th in Group stage	(Bangladesh) Sauravi Akanda Prity	1
2025–26	SWCC	Group Stage	(India) East Bengal	0–7	5th in Group stage	(Bangladesh) Sauravi Akanda Prity	1
2025–26	SWCC	Group Stage	(Bhutan) Transport United	1–1	5th in Group stage	(Bangladesh) Sauravi Akanda Prity	1

== Head coach's record ==
As of 13 February 2026

Head coach	From	To	P	W	D	L	GS	GA	%W
(Bangladesh) Md Didarul Alam Dipu	1 January 2020	25 August 2021	26	15	1	10	71	66	57.69
(Bangladesh) Shohel Rahman	10 June 2022	10 May 2022	17	9	4	4	71	42	52.94
(Bangladesh) Md Monir Hossain	1 October 2025	Present	14	1	2	11	13	100	7.14

== Club management ==
=== Technical staff (2025) ===
Position	Name
Head coach	(Bangladesh) Md Monir Hossain
Assistant coach	(Bangladesh) Md Kamal Hossain
Goalkeeper coach	(Bangladesh) Md Meraz

=== Board of directors ===
Position	Name
Team manager	(Bangladesh) Feroza Begum
Assistant manager	(Bangladesh) Nusrati Rahman Rashmi
Physio	(Bangladesh) Md Shamim Ahsan
Media officer	(Bangladesh) Md Easir Arafat (Bangladesh) Ataur Rahman Khan

== Honours ==
=== League ===
- Bangladesh Women's Football League
  - Winners (1): 2023–24
