= Bangladesh Women's Football League =

Association football league in Bangladesh

- Organising body: Bangladesh Football Federation
- Founded: November 2011; 14 years ago
- First season: 2011–12
- Country: Bangladesh
- Confederation: AFC (Asia)
- Number of clubs: 11
- Level on pyramid: 1
- International cup(s): AFC Women's Champions League; SAFF Women's Club Championship
- Current champions: Rajshahi Stars FC (1st title) (2025–26)
- Most championships: Bashundhara Kings (3 titles)
- Most appearances: Sabina Khatun (42)
- Top scorer: Sabina Khatun (134)
- Broadcaster(s): T Sports
- Website: bff.com.bd
- Current: 2025–26 Bangladesh Women's Football League

The Bangladesh Women's Football League (WFL), officially known as the UCB Women's Football League for sponsorship reasons and formerly as WFL, is a professional association football league and the highest level of women's club football competition in Bangladesh. Established in 2011, the league is run by the Bangladesh Football Federation.

== History ==
After two consecutive seasons, the league was postponed for indefinite because of financial issues. After a gap of 7 years, the BFF organised the third edition in 2020. The 2021–22 season had 12 clubs participating, the highest to date.

== Champions ==
2011–2013
Edition	Season	Champion	Result	Runner-up
1st	2011–12	Sheikh Jamal Dhanmondi	2–0	Dhaka Mohammedan
2nd	2012–13	Dhaka Abahani	3–1	Dhaka Mohammedan

2019–present
Edition	Season	Champion	Runner up	Ref.
3rd	2019–20	Bashundhara Kings	Nasrin SC	
4th	2020–21	Bashundhara Kings	ARB College	
5th	2021–22	Bashundhara Kings	ARB College	
6th	2023–24	Nasrin SC	ARB College	
7th	2025–26	Rajshahi Stars	Farashganj SC	

== Performance by club ==
Club	Titles	Runners–up	Winning seasons	Runners–up seasons
Bashundhara Kings Women	3		2019–20, 2020–21, 2021–22	
Nasrin Sporting Club	1	1	2023–24	2019–20
Sheikh Jamal Dhanmondi Club Women	1		2011–12	
Dhaka Abahani Women	1		2012–13	
Rajshahi Stars FC	1		2025–26	
ARB College SC		3		2020–21, 2021–22, 2023–24
Dhaka Mohammedan Women		2		2011–12, 2012–13
Farashganj SC Women		1		2025–26

== Current clubs ==
Locations of the 2025–26 Bangladesh Women's Football League teams

Eleven clubs participated in the 2025–26 Bangladesh Women's Football League:

Club	Location
Ansar & VDP	Dhaka
Bangladesh Army	Dhaka
Bangladesh Police	Dhaka
BKSP Football Club	Savar
Dhaka Rangers	Dhaka
Farashganj	Dhaka
Kacharipara Akadas	Jamalpur
Nasrin SC	Dhaka
Rajshahi Stars	Rajshahi
Siraj Srity Songsod	Rajshahi
Suddopuskorini Jubo	Rangpur

== All-time BWFL table ==
(Season: 2011/12 and 2025/26 — Last Update Date: 13 February 2026)
Pos.	Club	Part.	Pld	W	D	L	GF	GA	GD	Pts
1	Bashundhara Kings	3	37	37	0	0	342	2	+340	111
2	Nasrin Sports Academy	6	58	28	5	25	173	244	–71	89
3	ARB College	3	33	28	1	4	195	16	+179	85
4	Jamalpur KA	5	55	15	3	37	69	331	–262	48
5	Suddopuskorini JSC	4	43	14	3	26	80	144	–64	45
6	Bangladesh Army	2	18	14	0	4	92	28	+64	42
7	Siraj Srity Songsod	3	29	11	4	14	57	73	–16	37
8	Farashganj SC	4	31	12	0	19	83	112	–9	36
9	Brahmanbaria	2	25	10	5	10	36	79	–43	35
10	Cumilla United	3	37	9	8	20	35	123	–88	35
11	Rajshahi Stars	1	10	10	0	0	90	0	+90	30
12	Uttara FC	2	19	9	2	8	30	42	–12	29
13	Dhaka Rangers	3	29	6	3	20	33	131	–98	21
14	Bangladesh Police	2	13	6	1	6	48	42	+6	19
15	FC UttarBongo	1	12	5	1	6	27	40	–13	16
16	Dhaka Abahani	1	5	5	0	0	65	1	+64	15
17	Sheikh Jamal DC	1	5	5	0	0	61	0	+61	15
18	Dhaka Mohammedan	1	7	5	0	2	61	5	+56	15
19	Barishal FA	1	11	5	0	6	24	18	+6	15
20	BKSP FT	1	10	4	2	4	34	15	+19	14
21	Ansar & VDP	1	10	3	3	4	31	27	+4	12
22	Begum Anowara	1	12	4	0	8	13	38	–25	12
23	Kachijhuli SC	1	14	2	2	10	10	47	–37	8
24	Spartan MK Gallactico	1	12	2	1	9	9	61	–52	7
25	Dipali JS	1	4	2	0	2	12	8	+4	6
26	Feni SC	1	4	2	0	2	8	25	−17	6
27	Wari Club	1	3	1	0	2	4	17	−13	3
28	Arambagh KS	1	6	1	0	5	4	62	−58	3
29	Jatrabari KS	1	2	0	0	2	1	16	−15	0

== Winning coaches ==
Head coach	Club	Wins	Winning years
(Bangladesh) Mosharraf Badal	Sheikh Jamal DC	1	2011–12
(Bangladesh) Mahmuda Sharifa Oditi	Bashundhara Kings	1	2019–20
(Bangladesh) Abu Faisal Ahmed	Bashundhara Kings	1	2020–21
(Bangladesh) Syed Golam Jilani	Bashundhara Kings	1	2021–22
(Bangladesh) Shohel Rahman (Bangladesh) Mahmuda Sharifa Oditi	Nasrin SC	1	2023–24
(Bangladesh) Mahmuda Sharifa Oditi	Rajshahi Stars	1	2025–26

== Statistics and records ==
=== Seasonal statistics ===
As of 13 February 2026

Season	Matches played	Total Goals
2011–12	10	94
2012–13	12	129
2019–20	42	259
2020–21	56	299
2021–22	66	331
2023–24	36	200
2025–26	55	415
Total	277	1.727

=== Top goalscorers ===
As of 13 February 2026

Rank	Player	Seasons	Apps	Goals
1	(Bangladesh) Sabina Khatun	6	53	151
2	(Bangladesh) Alpi Akter	2	19	41
3	(Bangladesh) Krishna Rani Sarkar	3	31	36
4	(Bangladesh) Aklima Khatun	3	36	36
5	(Bangladesh) Tohura Khatun	4	44	35
6	(Bangladesh) Shamsunnahar Jr.	3	32	30
7	(Bangladesh) Sapna Rani	4	44	30
8	(Bangladesh) Aungmraching Marma	1	5	29
9	(Bangladesh) Mosammat Sultana	4	44	28
10	(Bangladesh) Ritu Porna Chakma	4	44	28
11	(Bangladesh) Anuching Mogini	3	36	27

=== Top scorers by season ===
Season	Player	Club	Goals
2011–12	(Bangladesh) Sabina Khatun	Sheikh Jamal DC	25
2012–13	(Bangladesh) Aungmraching Marma	Dhaka Abahani	29
2019–20	(Bangladesh) Sabina Khatun	Bashundhara Kings	35
2020–21	(Bangladesh) Krishna Rani Sarkar	Bashundhara Kings	28
2021–22	(Bangladesh) Aklima Khatun	ARB College SC	25
2023–24	(Bangladesh) Sabina Khatun	Nasrin SC	17
2025–26	(Bangladesh) Alpi Akter	Rajshahi Stars	30

=== Player of the season ===
Season	Player	Club
2011–12	(Bangladesh) Sui Nu Pru Marma	Dhaka Mohammedan
2012–13	(Bangladesh) Sabina Khatun	Dhaka Mohammedan
2019–20	(Bangladesh) Tohura Khatun	Bashundhara Kings
2020–21	(Bangladesh) Sohagi Kisku	ARB College SC
2021–22	(Bangladesh) Shaheda Akter Ripa	ARB College SC
2023–24	(Bangladesh) Mosammat Sultana	Bangladesh Army
2025–26	(Bangladesh) Shamsunnahar Jr.	Farashganj SC

== Sponsorship ==
Period	Sponsor	Name	Ref.
2011 – 13	Walton		
2019 – 21	Tricotex		
2021 – 22	Bashundhara Group	Bashundhara Group Women's Football League	
2023 – 24	United Commercial Bank	UCB Bangladesh Women's Football League	
2025–26	Dhaka Bank	Dhaka Bangladesh Women's Football League	

== See also ==
- Women's football in Bangladesh
- AFC Women's Club Championship
- SAFF Club Women's Championship
