= List of women's football clubs in Bangladesh =

The following is a list of clubs who have played in the Bangladesh Women's Football League since its formation in 2011 to the current 2025–26 season.

In Bangladesh, there is only one women's football league: the Bangladesh Women's Football League. Thus, there are no promotions or relegation to date.

== Bangladesh Women's Football League ==
=== Current clubs (2025–26) ===
Eleven clubs will compete in the 2025–26 Bangladesh Women's Football League:

Locations of the 2025–26 Bangladesh Women's Football League teams

Team	Location
Ansar & VDP	Dhaka
Bangladesh Army	Dhaka
Bangladesh Police	Dhaka
BKSP Football Club	Savar
Dhaka Rangers	Dhaka
Farashganj SC	Dhaka
Kacharipara Akadas	Jamalpur
Nasrin Sporting Academy	Dhaka
Rajshahi Stars	Rajshahi
Siraj Srity Songsod	Rajshahi
Suddopuskorini Jubo SC	Rangpur

=== Former clubs ===
The following clubs who had played in the Bangladesh Women's Football League in the earlier seasons but don't participate in the current 2025–26 season:

- ARB College Sporting Club
- Arambagh KS Women
- Barishal Football Academy
- Bashundara Kings Women
- Begum Anowara SC
- Brothers Union Women
- Cumilla United
- Dhaka Abahani Women
- Dhaka Mohammedan Women
- Dhaka Wanderers Club Women
- Dipali Jubo Sangha
- FC Brahminbaria
- FC Uttar Bongo
- Feni SC Women
- Jatrabari Krira Sangha
- Kachijhuli Sporting Club
- Sheikh Jamal Dhanmondi Club Women
- Spartan MK Gallactico Sylhet FC
- Uttara FC Women
- Wari Club Women

== See also ==
- Women's football in Bangladesh
- List of women's national football teams
- International competitions in women's association football
