= List of Bangladesh Women's Football League seasons =

Bangladesh Women's Football League
- Founded: 2 October 2011
- Country: Bangladesh
- Confederation: AFC (Asia)
- Number of clubs: 11
- Level on pyramid: 1
- International cup(s): AFC Women's Champions League; SAFF Women's Club Championship
- Current champions: Nasrin Sporting Academy (1st title) (2023–24)
- Most championships: Bashundhara Kings Women (3 titles)
- Current: 2025–26 Bangladesh Women's Football League

The Bangladesh Women's Football League (WFL), officially known as the UCB Women's Football League for sponsorship reasons and formerly as WFL, is a professional association football league and the highest level of women's club football competition in Bangladesh. Established in 2011, the league is run by the Bangladesh Football Federation.

== History ==
Bangladesh Women's Football League is the country's top flight domestic women's football league which is founded in 2011 by Bangladesh Football Federation. After two consecutive season, the league was postponed for indefinite time because of unknown reason. After a long gap of 7 years, Bangladesh Football Federation organised the third edition in 2020. Currently Cholo Kheli Trust is the Strategic partner for Bangladesh Women's Football and for next three years. Cholo Kheli Trust, a charitable foundation formed to work in the fields of Sports, Education, Health combined with Information, create strategies and execute them in association with respective Ministries. Inspire next generation youth of Bangladesh to love, appreciate and pick sports and Play. The Trust also want them to be well Educated, Healthy and be informed by the Best standards in the World.

== Seasons ==
Season	Champions	Runner-up	Top scorer(s)	Goals in WFL					
Season	Champions	Runner-up	Top scorer(s)	Goals in WFL	2011–12	Sheikh Jamal Dhanmondi Club Women	Dhaka Mohammedan Women	Sabina Khatun	25
2012–13	Dhaka Abahani Women	Dhaka Mohammedan Women	Aungmraching Marma	29					
2019–20	Bashundhara Kings Women	Nasrin Sporting Academy	Sabina Khatun	35					
2020–21	Bashundhara Kings Women	ARB College Sporting Club	Krishna Rani Sarkar	28					
2021–22	Bashundhara Kings Women	ARB College Sporting Club	Aklima Khatun	25					
2023–24	Nasrin Sporting Academy	ARB College Sporting Club	Sabina Khatun	17					
