= 2023–24 in Bangladeshi football =

2023–24 Bangladeshi football season

Football in Bangladesh
- Season: 2023–24

Men's football
- BPL: Bashundhara Kings
- BCL: Fakirerpool YMC
- 1st Division: Not Awarded
- 2nd Division: Not Held
- 3rd Division: Not Held
- U-18 League: Dhaka Abahani U-18
- U-16 League: Wari Club U-16
- Federation Cup: Bashundhara Kings
- Independence Cup: Bashundhara Kings

Women's football
- BWFL: Nasrin Sporting Club

The 2023–24 season was the 52nd competitive association football season in Bangladesh. The domestic season began on 1 August 2023 and concluded on 29 May 2024 while the national team season commenced on 15 June 2023 and ended on 11 June 2024.

== Men's national teams ==
=== Friendlies ===
15 June 2023 Friendly	Cambodia	0–1	Bangladesh	Phnom Penh, Cambodia
		Report	Mojibur 24'	Stadium: National Olympic Stadium; Attendance: 30,000; Referee: Wiwat Jumpaoon (Thailand)

4 September Friendly	Bangladesh	0–0	Afghanistan	Dhaka, Bangladesh
17:00 BST (UTC+6)		Report		Stadium: Bashundhara Kings Arena; Referee: Prakash Nath Shrestha (Nepal)

7 September Friendly	Bangladesh	1–1	Afghanistan	Dhaka, Bangladesh
17:00 BST (UTC+6)	Morsalin 62'	Report	Sharza 52'	Stadium: Bashundhara Kings Arena; Referee: Prajwol Chhetri (Nepal)

=== Group B ===
Pos	Team	Pld	W	D	L	GF	GA	GD	Pts	Qualification
1	Lebanon	3	3	0	0	7	1	+6	9	Qualified for Semi-finals
2	Bangladesh	3	2	0	1	6	4	+2	6	Qualified for Semi-finals
3	Maldives	3	1	0	2	3	4	−1	3	
4	Bhutan	3	0	0	3	2	9	−7	0	

Source: Global Sports Archive

22 June 2023 2023 SAFF Championship Group B	Lebanon	2–0	Bangladesh	Bengaluru, India
16:00 BST (UTC+6)	Maatouk 80'; Bader 90+6'	Report		Stadium: Sree Kanteerava Stadium; Attendance: 50; Referee: Crystal John (India)

25 June 2023 2023 SAFF Championship Group B	Bangladesh	3–1	Maldives	Bengaluru, India
16:00 BST (UTC+6)	Rakib 42'; Tariq 67'; Morsalin 90'	Report	Hamza 17'	Stadium: Sree Kanteerava Stadium; Attendance: 100; Referee: Prajwol Chhetri (Nepal)

28 June 2023 2023 SAFF Championship Group B	Bhutan	1–3	Bangladesh	Bengaluru, India
20:00 BST (UTC+6)	Dorji 12'	Report	Morsalin 21'; Jigme 30' (o.g.); Rakib 36'	Stadium: Sree Kanteerava Stadium; Referee: Crystal John (India)

1 July 2023 2023 SAFF Championship SF	Kuwait	1–0 (a.e.t.)	Bangladesh	Bangalore, India
15:30 BST (UTC+6)	Al-Buloushi 105+2'	Report		Stadium: Sree Kanteerava Stadium; Attendance: 500; Referee: Crystal John (India)

=== 2026 FIFA World Cup qualifying Round 1 ===
12 October 2023 2026 FIFA World Cup qualification – AFC first round	Maldives	1–1	Bangladesh	Malé, Maldives
17:00 BST (UTC+6)	Nazeem 87'	Report	Saad 90+2'	Stadium: National Football Stadium; Attendance: 2,555; Referee: Seyed Vahid Kazemi (Iran)

17 October 2023 2026 FIFA World Cup qualification – AFC first round	Bangladesh	2-1 (3-2 agg.)	Maldives	Dhaka
17:45 UTC+6	Rakib 11'; Fahim 46'	Report	Aisam 36'	Stadium: Bashundhara Kings Arena, Dhaka; Attendance: 6,729; Referee: Ammar Mahfoodh (Bahrain)

=== 2026 FIFA World Cup qualification – AFC second round ===
==== Group I ====
Pos	Team	Pld	W	D	L	GF	GA	GD	Pts	Qualification	(Australia)	(Palestine)	(Lebanon)	(Bangladesh)
1	Australia	6	6	0	0	22	0	+22	18	World Cup qualifying third round and Asian Cup	—	5–0	2–0	7–0
2	Palestine	6	2	2	2	6	6	0	8	World Cup qualifying third round and Asian Cup	0–1	—	0–0	5–0
3	Lebanon	6	1	3	2	5	8	−3	6	Asian Cup qualifying third round	0–5	0–0	—	4–0
4	Bangladesh	6	0	1	5	1	20	−19	1	Asian Cup qualifying third round	0–2	0–1	1–1	—

Source: FIFA AFC

16 November 2023 2026 WCQ R2 / 2027 ACQ	Australia	7–0	Bangladesh	Melbourne, Australia
15:00 BST (UTC+6)	Souttar 4'; Borrello 20'; Duke 37', 40'; Maclaren 48', 70', 84'	Report		Stadium: Melbourne Rectangular Stadium; Attendance: 20,876; Referee: Ahrol Risqullaev (Uzbekistan)

21 November 2023 2026 WCQ R2 / 2027 ACQ	Bangladesh	1–1	Lebanon	Dhaka, Bangladesh
17:45 BST (UTC+6)	Morsalin 72'	Report	Osman 67'	Stadium: Bashundhara Kings Arena; Attendance: 20,000; Referee: Kim Dae-yong (South Korea)

21 March 2024 2026 WCQ R2 / 2027 ACQ	Bangladesh	0–5	Palestine	Jaber Al-Ahmad International Stadium, Kuwait City (Kuwait)
00:30 BST (UTC+6)	Dabbagh 43', 53', 77'; Qunbar 45+1', 49'	Report		Attendance: 37,432; Referee: Shen Yinhao (China)

26 March 2024 2026 WCQ R2 / 2027 ACQ	Bangladesh	0–1	Palestine	Dhaka, Bangladesh
15:30 BST (UTC+6)	Termanini 90+4'	Report		Stadium: Bashundhara Kings Arena; Attendance: 5,195; Referee: Nasrullo Kabirov (Tajikistan)

6 March 2024 2026 WCQ R2 / 2027 ACQ	Bangladesh	0–2	Australia	Dhaka, Bangladesh
16:45 BST (UTC+6)		Report	Hrustic 29'; Yengi 62'	Stadium: Bashundhara Kings Arena; Attendance: 5,227; Referee: Jansen Foo (Singapore)

11 June 2024 2026 WCQ R2 / 2027 ACQ	Lebanon	4–0	Bangladesh	Khalifa International Stadium, Al Rayyan (Qatar) (Note: Lebanon will play all their home matches at a neutral venue until further notice, due to the adjacent Gaza war.)
22:00 BST (UTC+6)	Maatouk 5' (pen.), 49', 60'; Matar 45+2'	Report		Stadium: Khalifa International Stadium; Attendance: 13,721; Referee: Razlan Joffri Ali (Malaysia)

== Under-23 team ==
=== Group H ===
Pos	Team	Pld	W	D	L	GF	GA	GD	Pts	Qualification
1	Thailand (H)	3	3	0	0	9	0	+9	9	Final tournament
2	Malaysia	3	2	0	1	6	1	+5	6	Possible final tournament
3	Philippines	3	1	0	2	1	9	−8	3	
4	Bangladesh	3	0	0	3	0	6	−6	0	

Source: AFC
Rules for classification: Qualification tiebreakers
(H) Hosts

6 September 2023 2024 AFC U-23 Asian Cup qualification Group H	Malaysia	2–0	Bangladesh	Chonburi, Thailand
15:30 BST (UTC+6)	Izwan 81'; Tierney 90+4'	Report		Stadium: Chonburi Stadium; Attendance: 750; Referee: Omar Mohamed Al Ali (United Arab Emirates)

9 September 2023 2024 AFC U-23 Asian Cup qualification Group H	Bangladesh	0–3	Thailand	Chonburi, Thailand
19:30 BST (UTC+6)		Report	Purachet 44', 45+3'; Airfan 87'	Stadium: Chonburi Stadium; Attendance: 1,500; Referee: Yusuf Atef MA Al-Shamari (Qatar)

12 September 2023 2024 AFC U-23 Asian Cup qualification Group H	Bangladesh	0–1	Philippines	Chonburi, Thailand
15:30 BST (UTC+6)			Gavin Muens 56' (pen.)	Stadium: Chonburi Stadium; Attendance: 300; Referee: Faisal Sulaiman A Albawali (Saudi Arabia)

=== Group A ===
Pos	Team	Pld	W	D	L	GF	GA	GD	Pts	Qualification
1	China (H)	3	2	1	0	9	1	+8	7	Knockout stage
2	India	3	1	1	1	3	6	−3	4	Knockout stage
3	Myanmar	3	1	1	1	2	5	−3	4	Knockout stage
4	Bangladesh	3	0	1	2	0	2	−2	1	

Source: Football – Men – Groups
Rules for classification: Group stage tiebreakers
(H) Hosts

19 September 2023	Bangladesh	0–1	Myanmar	Hangzhou, China
18:00 BST (UTC+6)		Report	Hasan 69' (o.g.)	Stadium: Yellow Dragon Sports Center; Attendance: 3,087; Referee: Daiyrbek Abdyldaev (Kyrgyzstan)

21 September 2023	India	1–0	Bangladesh	Hangzhou, China
18:00 BST (UTC+6)	Chhetri 85' (pen.)	Report		Stadium: Yellow Dragon Sports Center; Attendance: 1,150; Referee: Clifford Postanes Daypuyat (Philippines)

24 September 2023	China	0–0	Bangladesh	Hangzhou, China
21:30 BST (UTC+6)		Report		Stadium: Huanglong Sports Centre Stadium; Attendance: 36,918; Referee: Mongkolchai Pechsri (Thailand)

== Under-19 ==
Group B

Pos	Team	Pld	W	D	L	GF	GA	GD	Pts	Qualification
1	India	2	2	0	0	5	1	+4	6	Qualified for Knockout stage
2	Bhutan	2	1	0	1	5	5	0	3	Qualified for Knockout stage
3	Bangladesh	2	0	0	2	3	7	−4	0	

Source: GSA

21 September 2023 2023 SAFF U-19 Championship Group stage	Bangladesh	0–3	India	Kathmandu, Nepal
13:45 BST (UTC+6)		Report	Gwgmsar Goyary 1'; Naoba Meitei Pangabam 45+5'; Arjun Singh Oinam 90'	Stadium: Dashrath Stadium; Attendance: 201; Referee: Nadheem Ali (Maldives)

23 September 2023 2023 SAFF U-19 Championship Group stage	Bhutan	4–3	Bangladesh	Kathmandu, Nepal
17:45 BST (UTC+6)	Jigme Namgyel 32', 68'; Kingzang Tenzi 45+3'; Rinzin Dorji 84'	Report	Md Rubel Shaikh 3'; Asadul Molla 30'; Razu Ahmed Zisan 55'	Stadium: Dashrath Stadium; Attendance: 300; Referee: Adnan Anjum (Pakistan)

== Under-16 ==
Group A

Pos	Team	Pld	W	D	L	GF	GA	GD	Pts	Qualification
1	India	2	2	0	0	2	0	+2	6	Qualified for Knockout stage
2	Bangladesh	2	1	0	1	1	1	0	3	Qualified for Knockout stage
3	Nepal	2	0	0	2	0	2	−2	0	

Source: GSA

2 September 2023 2023 SAFF U-16 Championship Group A	Bangladesh	0–1	India	Thimphu, Bhutan
15:00 BST (UTC+6)		Report	Thoungamba Singh 75'	Stadium: Changlimithang Stadium; Attendance: 720; Referee: Penjor Ugyen (Bhutan)

4 September 2023 2023 SAFF U-16 Championship Group A	Bangladesh	1–0	Nepal	Thimphu, Bhutan
19:00 BST (UTC+6)	Md Ashikur Rahman 47'	Report		Stadium: Changlimithang Stadium; Referee: Zaheer Hussain (Maldives)

=== Semi-finals ===
8 September 2023 2023 SAFF U-16 Championship Semi-finals	Pakistan	1–2	Bangladesh	Thimphu, Bhutan
17:30 BST (UTC+6)	Abdul Ghani 6'	Report	Murshed Ali 14'; Md Abu Sayed 29'	Stadium: Changlimithang Stadium; Attendance: 450; Referee: Penjor Ugyen (Bhutan)

=== Final ===
10 September 2023 2023 SAFF U-16 Championship Final	India	2-0	Bangladesh	Thimphu, Bhutan
17:30 BST (UTC+6)	Bharat Lairenjam 9'; Levis Zangminlun 74'	Report		Stadium: Changlimithang Stadium; Attendance: 4,700

== Women's national teams ==
=== Friendlies ===
13 July 2023 Friendly	Bangladesh	1–1	Nepal	Dhaka, Bangladesh
17:30 BST (UTC+6)	Khatun 66'	Report	Bhandari 90+1'	Stadium: Bir Sherestha Shaheed Shipahi Mostafa Kamal Stadium; Referee: Choki Om (Bhutan)

16 July 2023 Friendly	Bangladesh	0–0 (2–4 p)	Nepal	Dhaka, Bangladesh
17:30 BST (UTC+6)		Report		Stadium: Bir Sherestha Shaheed Shipahi Mostafa Kamal Stadium; Referee: Kanika Barman (India)

October 2023 Friendly	Lebanon	v	Bangladesh	Lebanon
: BST (UTC+6)				Stadium: TBD

October 2023 Friendly	Lebanon	v	Bangladesh	Lebanon
: BST (UTC+6)				Stadium: TBD

1 December 2023 Friendly	Bangladesh	3–0	Singapore	Dhaka, Bangladesh
16:00 BST (UTC+6)	Afeida Khandaker 3'; T. Khatun 16', 60'	Report (BFF)		Stadium: Bir Sherestha Shaheed Shipahi Mostafa Kamal Stadium; Referee: Appuhamila Pabasara Minisarani (Sri Lanka)

4 December 2023 Friendly	Bangladesh	8–0	Singapore	Dhaka, Bangladesh
15:00 BST (UTC+6)	T. Khatun 16', 24'; Ritu Chakma 18', 62'; S. Akhter 57'; Khatun 75'; Matsushima 87'; Shamsunnahar Jr. 91'	Report		Stadium: Bir Sherestha Shaheed Shipahi Mostafa Kamal Stadium; Referee: Choki Om (Bhutan)

31 May 2024 Friendly	Bangladesh	0–4	Chinese Taipei	Dhaka, Bangladesh
17:45 BST (UTC+6)		Report	Su Yu-hsuan 12', 27', 56'; Su Sin-yun 19'	Stadium: Bashundhara Kings Arena; Referee: Choki Om (Bhutan)

3 June 2024 Friendly	Bangladesh	0–1	Chinese Taipei	Dhaka, Bangladesh
17:45 BST (UTC+6)		Report	Su Yu-hsuan 17'	Stadium: Bashundhara Kings Arena; Referee: Yapa Pabasara Minisaraniyapa (Sri Lanka)

=== Asian Games ===
Group D

Pos	Team	Pld	W	D	L	GF	GA	GD	Pts	Qualification
1	Japan	3	3	0	0	23	0	+23	9	Knockout stage
2	Vietnam	3	2	0	1	8	8	0	6	Possible knockout stage
3	Nepal	3	0	1	2	1	11	−10	1	
4	Bangladesh	3	0	1	2	2	15	−13	1	

Source: Football – Women – Groups
Rules for classification: Group stage tiebreakers

22 September 2023 Football at the 2023 Asian Games Group D	Japan	8–0	Bangladesh	Wenzhou, China
17:30 BST (UTC+6)	Chiba 7', 29'; Tanikawa 8' (pen.), 80'; Shiokoshi 45'; Hijikata 49'; Sakakibara 58', 85'	Report		Stadium: Wenzhou Sports Centre; Attendance: 2,744; Referee: Kim Yu-jeong (South Korea)

25 September 2023 Football at the 2023 Asian Games Group D	Bangladesh	1–6	Vietnam	Wenzhou, China
14:00 BST (UTC+6)	Parvin 87' (pen.)	Report	Phạm Hải Yến 5'; Nguyễn Thị Thúy Hằng 34'; Trần Thị Duyên 66'; Thái Thị Thảo 78'; Nguyễn Thị Bích Thùy 71', 80'	Stadium: Wenzhou Sports Centre; Attendance: 2,108; Referee: Yu Hong (China)

28 September 2023 Football at the 2023 Asian Games Group D	Nepal	1–1	Bangladesh	Wenzhou, China
14:00 BST (UTC+6)	Rekha Poudel 82'	Report	Khatun 44'	Stadium: Wenzhou Sports Centre; Attendance: 3,304; Referee: Yu Hong (China)

=== Round robin ===
Pos	Team	Pld	W	D	L	GF	GA	GD	Pts	Status
1	Bangladesh (H)	3	3	0	0	8	1	+7	9	Advance to the Final
2	India	3	2	0	1	14	1	+13	6	Advance to the Final
3	Nepal	3	1	0	2	2	7	−5	3	
4	Bhutan	3	0	0	3	0	15	−15	0	

Source: SAFF
(H) Hosts

2 February 2023 2024 SAFF U-19 Women's Championship Round robin	Nepal	1–3	Bangladesh	Dhaka, Bangladesh
19:00 BST (UTC+6)	Sukriya Miya 54'	Report	Mst. Sagorika 40', 57'; Munki Akhter 42'	Stadium: BSSS Mostafa Kamal Stadium; Attendance: 1,938; Referee: Kanika Barman (India)

4 February 2024 2024 SAFF U-19 Women's Championship Round robin	Bangladesh	1–0	India	Dhaka, Bangladesh
19:00 BST (UTC+6)	Mst. Sagorika 90+2'	Report		Stadium: BSSS Mostafa Kamal Stadium; Attendance: 1,327; Referee: Tshering Yangkhey (Bhutan)

6 February 2024 2024 SAFF U-19 Women's Championship Round robin	Bangladesh	4–0	Bhutan	Dhaka, Bangladesh
19:00 BST (UTC+6)	Nusrat Jahan Mitu 18'; Mst Oeyshi Khatun 31', 63'; Sree Moti Trishna Rani 58'	Report		Stadium: BSSS Mostafa Kamal Stadium; Attendance: 1,143; Referee: Anjana Rai (Nepal)

==== Final ====
8 February 2024 2024 SAFF U-19 Women's Championship Final	Bangladesh	1–1 (11–11 p)	India	Dhaka, Bangladesh
18:00 BST (UTC+6)	Mst. Sagorika 90+3'	Report	Sibani Devi 8'	Stadium: BSSS Mostafa Kamal Stadium; Attendance: 4,879; Referee: Anjana Rai (Nepal)
	Penalties
	Afeida Khandaker (penalty scored); Mst Surma Jannat (penalty scored); Mst Joynob Bibi Rita (penalty scored); Sapna Rani (penalty scored); Munki Akhter (penalty scored); Mst Eity Khatun (penalty scored); Mst Sultana Akter (penalty scored); Umehla Marma (penalty scored); Mst. Sagorika (penalty scored); Kanon Rani Bahadur (penalty scored); Swarna Rani Mandal (penalty scored)		(penalty scored) Neha; (penalty scored) Nitu Linda; (penalty scored) Sibani Devi Nongmeikapam; (penalty scored) Lalita Boypai; (penalty scored) Thoibisana Chanu Toijam; (penalty scored) Sulanjana Raul; (penalty scored) Viskit Bara; (penalty scored) Pooja; (penalty scored) Heena Khatun; (penalty scored) Sonibia Devi Irom; (penalty scored) Anika Devi Sharubam

=== Group B ===
Pos	Team	Pld	W	D	L	GF	GA	GD	Pts	Qualification
1	Australia	3	3	0	0	12	3	+9	9	Final tournament
2	Philippines	3	2	0	1	6	7	−1	6	Final tournament
3	Vietnam (H)	3	1	0	2	3	3	0	3	
4	Bangladesh	3	0	0	3	1	9	−8	0	

Source: AFC
Rules for classification: Qualification tiebreakers
(H) Hosts

20 September 2023 2024 AFC U-17 Women's Asian Cup qualification Group B	Bangladesh	0–2	Vietnam	Hanoi, Vietnam
18:00 BST (UTC+6)		Report	Nguyễn Ngô Thảo Nguyên 41'; Ngân Thị Thanh Hiếu 64'	Stadium: Vietnam Youth Football Training Center; Referee: Sabin Ramos (Philippine)

22 September 2023 2024 AFC U-17 Women's Asian Cup qualification Group B	Philippines	2–0	Bangladesh	Hanoi, Vietnam
15:00 BST (UTC+6)	Nguyễn Ngô Thảo Nguyên 41'; Ngân Thị Thanh Hiếu 64'	Report		Stadium: Vietnam Youth Football Training Center; Referee: Sugino Azusa (Japan)

24 September 2023 2024 AFC U-17 Women's Asian Cup qualification Group B	Australia	4–0	Bangladesh	Hanoi, Vietnam
15:00 BST (UTC+6)	Sienna Dale 2', 57', 61', 74'	Report		Stadium: Vietnam Youth Football Training Center; Referee: Supiree Testhomya (Cambodia)

=== Round robin ===
==== League table ====
Pos	Team	Pld	W	D	L	GF	GA	GD	Pts	Status
1	Bangladesh	3	3	0	0	11	1	+10	9	Qualified for Final
2	India	3	2	0	1	18	3	+15	6	Qualified for Final
3	Nepal	3	1	0	2	3	12	−9	3	
4	Bhutan	3	0	0	3	0	16	−16	0	

Source: GSA

2 March 2024 2024 SAFF U-16 Women's Championship Round robin	Bangladesh	2–0	Nepal	Lalitpur, Nepal
15:15 BST (UTC+6)	Prity 24', 31'	Report		Stadium: ANFA Complex; Attendance: 103; Referee: Meera Tamang (Nepal)

5 March 2024 2024 SAFF U-16 Women's Championship Round robin	Bangladesh	3–1	India	Lalitpur, Nepal
15:15 BST (UTC+6)	Alpi Akter 9'; Prity 78'; Arpita Bishwas 89'	Report	Anushka Kumari 55'	Stadium: ANFA Complex; Attendance: 200; Referee: Maya Lama (Nepal)

=== Final ===
10 March 2024 2024 SAFF U-16 Women's Championship Final	Bangladesh	1–1 (3–2 p)	India	Lalitpur, Nepal
15:15 BST (UTC+6)	Mariam Binte Hanna 71'	Report	Anushka Kumari 5'	Stadium: ANFA Complex; Attendance: 206; Referee: Maya Lama (Nepal)
	Penalties
	Sauravi Akanda Prity (penalty missed); Mariam Binte Hanna (penalty scored); Thuinuye Marma (penalty scored); Alpi Akter (penalty missed); Sathi Munda (penalty scored)		Shveta Rani (penalty scored); Alena Devi Sarangthem (penalty missed); Bonifilia Shullai (penalty missed); Anwita Raghuraman (penalty scored); Divyani Linda (penalty missed)

== AFC competitions ==
=== AFC Champions League ===
==== Preliminary round ====
15 August 2023	Sharjah (United Arab Emirates)	2–0	(Bangladesh) Bashundhara Kings	Sharjah Stadium, Sharjah
19:35 UTC+4	Luanzinho 45+3', 71'	Report		Attendance: 1,426; Referee: Nasrullo Kabirov (Tajikistan)

=== AFC Cup ===
==== Preliminary round ====
16 August 2023	Dhaka Abahani (Bangladesh)	2–1	(Maldives) Club Eagles	Sylhet
15:15 UTC+6	Stewart 21'; Quipapá 89'	Report	Rizuvan 63'	Stadium: Sylhet District Stadium; Attendance: 1,823; Referee: Zainiddinov Sayyodjon (Tajikistan)

==== Play-off round ====
22 August 2023	Mohun Bagan SG (India)	3–1	(Bangladesh) Dhaka Abahani	Kolkata, India
19:00 UTC+5:30	Cummings 37' (pen.); Soleimani 58' (o.g.); Sadiku 60'	Report	Stewart 17'	Stadium: Salt Lake Stadium; Attendance: 10,625; Referee: Bijan Heydari (Iran)

==== Group Stage ====
The draw for the 2023–24 AFC Cup group stage was held on 24 August 2023 at AFC House in Kuala Lumpur, Malaysia. The first group matches will be played on 18 September 2023.

Pos	Team	Pld	W	D	L	GF	GA	GD	Pts	Qualification	ODI	BDK	MBSG	MAZ
1	(India) Odisha	6	4	0	2	17	12	+5	12	Inter-zone play-off semi-finals	—	1–0	0–4	6–1
2	(Bangladesh) Bashundhara Kings	6	3	1	2	10	10	0	10		3–2	—	2–1	2–1
3	(India) Mohun Bagan SG	6	2	1	3	11	11	0	7		2–5	2–2	—	2–1
4	(Maldives) Maziya	6	2	0	4	9	14	−5	6		2–3	3–1	1–0	—

Source: AFC
Rules for classification: Group stage tiebreakers

19 September 2023 1	Maziya (Maldives)	3–1	(Bangladesh) Bashundhara Kings	Malé, Maldives
16:00 BST (UTC+6)	Balabanović 15'; K. Gamal (yellow card) 28'; Nazeem 68'; H. Nihan (yellow card) 80'; Fasir 90+1'	Report	Rakib (yellow card) 52'; Saad (yellow card) 90'; Ibrahim 90+3'	Stadium: National Football Stadium; Attendance: 874; Referee: Razlan Joffri bin Ali (Malaysia)

2 October 2023 2	Bashundhara Kings (Bangladesh)	3–2	(India) Odisha FC	Dhaka, Bangladesh
18:00 BST (UTC+6)	M. Figueira 39', (yellow card) 90+2'; Dori 45', 54', (yellow card) 56'; S. Rana (yellow card) 90+7'	Report	C. Delgado (yellow card) 15'; D. Maurício 19'; P. Rebello (yellow card) 43'; J. Lalrinzuala 66'; R. Krishna (yellow card) 77'; Thoiba (yellow card) 88'	Stadium: Bashundhara Kings Arena; Attendance: 7,137; Referee: Mohammad Hasan Mahmoud Arafah (Jordan)

24 October 2023 3	Mohun Bagan SG (India)	2–2	(Bangladesh) Bashundhara Kings	Odisha, India
22:00 BST (UTC+6)	D. Petratos 29'; A. Rai 54'; J. Cummings (yellow card) 61'; A. Thapa (yellow card) 88'	Report	Dori 33', (yellow card) 55'; Robinho 70' (pen.)	Stadium: Kalinga Stadium; Attendance: 150; Referee: Clifford Postanes Daypuyat (Philippines)

6 November 2023 4	Bashundhara Kings (Bangladesh)	2–1	(India) Mohun Bagan SG	Dhaka, Bangladesh
20:00 BST (UTC+6)	M. Figueira 44'; Robinho 80'; M. Srabon (yellow card) 90'	Report	L. Colaco 17', (yellow card) 65'; S. Samad (yellow card) 74'; H. Boumous (yellow card) 83'; G. Martins (yellow card) 90+5'	Stadium: Bashundhara Kings Arena; Attendance: 7,137; Referee: Suhaizi Shukri (Malaysia)

27 November 2023 5	Bashundhara Kings (Bangladesh)	2–1	(Maldives) Maziya	Dhaka, Bangladesh
18:00 BST (UTC+6)	Rakib (yellow card) 40'; Yuldashev 80' (yellow card) 78'; Figueira 88'	Report	Regan 11'; Shareef (yellow card) 57'	Stadium: Bashundhara Kings Arena; Attendance: 6,552; Referee: Mohammad Hasan Mahmoud Arafah (Jordan)

11 December 2023 6	Odisha (India)	1–0	(Bangladesh) Bashundhara Kings	Bhubaneswar, India
	Fall 61'	Report		Stadium: Kalinga Stadium; Attendance: 5,132; Referee: Ngô Duy Lân (Vietnam)

== Men's club football ==
=== League season ===
==== League table ====
Pos	Team	Pld	W	D	L	GF	GA	GD	Pts	Qualification or relegation
1	Bashundhara Kings (C, W, Q)	18	14	3	1	49	13	+36	45	Qualification for the AFC Challenge League group stage and 2024 Bangladesh Challenge Cup
2	Mohammedan SC (Q)	18	9	8	1	40	17	+23	35	Qualification for the 2024 Bangladesh Challenge Cup (Note: being Bashundhara Kings Champions and winners of both league and 2023–24 Federation Cup, Mohammedan SC qualified for 2024 Bangladesh Challenge Cup after being runners-up in both league and cup.)
3	Abahani Ltd. Dhaka	18	9	5	4	34	22	+12	32	
4	Bangladesh Police FC	18	7	5	6	23	19	+4	26	
5	Fortis FC	18	6	6	6	21	23	−2	24	
6	Sheikh Russel KC	18	4	7	7	20	24	−4	19	
7	Chittagong Abahani	18	4	7	7	22	29	−7	19	
8	Sheikh Jamal DC	18	4	5	9	14	24	−10	17	
9	Rahmatganj MFS	18	2	10	6	19	26	−7	16	
10	Brothers Union	18	1	4	13	21	66	−45	7	

Source: Soccerway
Rules for classification: 1) Points; 2) Goal difference; 3) Goals scored.
(C) Champion; (Q) Qualify for the phase indicated; (W) Cup Winner

==== League table ====
Pos	Team	Pld	W	D	L	GF	GA	GD	Pts	BPL
1	Fakirerpool YMC (C, P)	14	8	3	3	28	14	+14	27	Qualification to 2024–25 Bangladesh Premier League
2	Dhaka Wanderers (P)	14	6	6	2	17	8	+9	24	Qualification to 2024–25 Bangladesh Premier League
3	PWD SC	14	6	5	3	20	14	+6	23	
4	BFF Elite Academy	14	6	4	4	20	18	+2	22	
5	Wari Club	14	5	5	4	14	9	+5	20	
6	NoFeL Sporting Club	14	3	8	3	9	11	−2	17	
7	Farashganj SC (R)	14	2	6	6	13	22	−9	12	Relegation to 2024–25 Dhaka Senior Division League
8	Uttara FC (R)	14	1	1	12	10	35	−25	4	Relegation to 2024–25 Dhaka Senior Division League

Source: Global Sports Archive
Rules for classification: 1) Points; 2) Goal difference; 3) Goals scored;
(C) Champions; (P) Promoted; (R) Relegated

=== Cup competitions ===
==== 2023–24 Independence Cup (Bangladesh) ====
Final
3 December–Dhaka
Bangladesh Police FC	1
Rahmatganj MFS	2
5 December –Munshigonj
Dhaka Mohammedan	1
Chittagong Abahani	0
3 December –Dhaka
Dhaka Abahani (p)	1 (3)
Sheikh Jamal DC	1 (2)
5 December –Dhaka
Bashundhara Kings	2
Bangladesh Army	1

Semi-finals
15 December –Gopalganj
Rahmatganj MFS	0
Dhaka Mohammedan	1
15 December–Dhaka
Dhaka Abahani	0
Bashundhara Kings	4

Final
18 December–Gopalganj
Bashundhara Kings	2
Dhaka Mohammedan	1

==== Final ====
18 December 2023
13:45 BST (UTC+6)

Mohammedan SC	1–2	Bashundhara Kings
Emmanuel 51'	Report	Rakib 52'; Dorielton 86'

Sheikh Fazlul Haque Mani Stadium, Gopalganj
Referee: Md Jalal Uddin

=== Bracket ===
Quarter-finals
2 April–Gopalganj
Mohammedan SC	2
Sheikh Russel KC	1
23 April–Gopalganj
Sheikh Jamal DC	0
Bangladesh Police FC	3
16 April–Gopalganj
Bashundhara Kings	2
Rahmatganj MFS	0
30 April–Dhaka
Abahani Limited Dhaka	3
Fortis FC	1

Semi-finals
7 May–Munshigonj
Mohammedan SC	2
Bangladesh Police FC	1
14 May–Munshigonj
Bashundhara Kings	3
Abahani Limited Dhaka	0

Final
22 May–Mymensingh
Mohammedan SC	1
Bashundhara Kings (a.e.t.)	2

==== Final ====
22 May 2024
15:00 BST (UTC+6)

Mohammedan SC	1–2 (a.e.t.)	Bashundhara Kings
Emmanuel 63'	Report	Figueira 87'; Jahid 105'

Rafiq Uddin Bhuiyan Stadium, Mymensingh
Referee: Jasim Akhter

== Women's club football ==
=== League season ===
==== League table ====
Pos	Team	Pld	W	D	L	GF	GA	GD	Pts	Qualification
1	Nasrin Sporting Club (C)	8	7	1	0	67	4	+63	22	Qualification to the 2025 SAFF Club Championship
2	ARB College SC	8	6	1	1	48	5	+43	19	
3	Bangladesh Army FC	8	6	0	2	24	5	+19	18	
4	Suddopuskorini Jubo SC	8	4	1	3	16	18	−2	13	
5	Siraj Srity Songsod	8	3	2	3	16	6	+10	11	
6	Farashganj SC Women	8	3	0	5	11	25	−14	9	
7	Dhaka Rangers FC	8	2	1	5	12	29	−17	7	
8	Uttara FC Women	8	2	0	6	5	35	−30	6	
9	Jamalpur Kacharipara Akadas	8	0	0	8	1	73	−72	0	

Source: BFF
(C) Champions
