= FC Brahmanbaria Women =

Bangladeshi Women's Football club

- Full name: Football Club Brahmanbaria Women
- Nickname: FCB
- Founded: 15 June 2017; 8 years ago
- Ground: Niaz Mohammad Stadium Brahmanbaria
- Capacity: 15,000
- Owner: Md Shahadat Hossain
- President: TM Shakat Ali Mostafa
- Head coach: Md Jahir Iqbal
- League: Bangladesh Women's Football League
- 2021–22: 10th of 12
Home colours

Football Club Brahmanbaria Women (Bengali: ফুটবল ক্লাব ব্রাহ্মণবাড়িয়া নারী দল) is a professional Bangladeshi Women's association football from Brahmanbaria. The club was founded on 2017 and currently plays in Bangladesh Women's Football League.

== History ==
The club were founded 2017 and it participated 2020–21 Bangladesh Women's Football League season. The club played their inaugural match against Jamalpur Kacharipara Akadas on 1 April 2021 and scored a 0–1 victory.

== Current squad ==
FC Brahmanbaria Women squad for 2021–22 season.

As of 11 November 2022

Note: Flags indicate national team as defined under FIFA eligibility rules; some limited exceptions apply. Players may hold more than one non-FIFA nationality.

No.	Pos.	Nation	Player
1	GK	BAN	Purnima Baspor
2	DF	BAN	Mini Hem Brom
3	DF	BAN	Salma
4	DF	BAN	Irin Akter
5	DF	BAN	Balshri Mankin Moyna
6	DF	BAN	Mantona Murari
7	FW	BAN	Ameena Khatun (Captain)
8	DF	BAN	Janira Manda
9	MF	BAN	Mst Afrin Akter
10	MF	BAN	Devi Rani Das
11	MF	BAN	Romana
12	FW	BAN	Nur Nahar Akter
13	DF	BAN	Mst Mohona Akter Mim
14	MF	BAN	Fahima Akter
15	FW	BAN	Rubina Akter
16	MF	BAN	Mahamuda Islam
17	DF	BAN	Rumita Soran
18	DF	BAN	Misty Akter
19	DF	BAN	Beli Soran
20	FW	BAN	Mst Sagorika
21	FW	BAN	Fatema Akter
22	GK	BAN	Sadia Sultana Urme
23	MF	BAN	Riya Akter
24	DF	BAN	Salma Islam
25	GK	BAN	Mst Munei Akter
26	DF	BAN	Fahmida Reshme
27	DF	BAN	Sumi
28	DF	BAN	Sree Protika Rani Roy
29	GK	BAN	Tanjina Akther
30	GK	BAN	Broasha Mistry

== Competitive record ==
As of 29 December 2022

Season	Division	League								League top scorer(s)	
Season	Division	P	W	D	L	GF	GA	Pts	Position	Players	Goals
2021–22	BWFL	11	3	2	6	15	47	11	10	(Bangladesh) Mst Sagorika	10

== Club management ==
=== Current technical staff ===
As of December 2022

Position	Name
Head coach	(Bangladesh) Md Jahir Iqbal

== Head coach records ==
As of 29 December 2022

Head Coach	From	To	P	W	D	L	GF	GA	%W
(Bangladesh) Suehla Mong Marma	2020	15 March 2021	14	7	3	4	21	32	50.00
(Bangladesh) Md Jahir Iqbal	2 September 2022	Present	11	3	2	6	15	47	27.27

P – Total of played matches

W – Won matches

D – Drawn matches

L – Lost matches

GS – Goals scored

GA – Goals against

%W – Percentage of matches won

== See also ==
- Bashundhara Kings Women
- Nasrin Sporting Academy
- ARB College Sporting Club
- Jamalpur Kacharipara Akadas
- Bangladesh Women's Football League
