= 2020–21 Bangladesh Women's Football League =

4th season of the Bangladesh Women's Football League

Bangladesh Women's Football League
- Season: 2020–21
- Dates: 31 March 2021 – 19 July 2021
- Champions: Bashundhara Kings; 2nd title
- Matches: 56
- Goals: 299 (5.34 per match)
- Best player: (Bangladesh) Sohagi Kisku (ARB Sporting Club)
- Top goalscorer: (Bangladesh) Krishna Rani Sarkar (28 goals) (Bashundhara Kings)
- Highest scoring: Bashundhara Kings 20–0 Nasrin Sporting Club (8 June 2021)
- Longest winning run: Bashundhara Kings (14 Matches)
- Longest unbeaten run: Bashundhara Kings (14 Matches)
- Longest winless run: Suddopuskorini Jubo SC (13 Matches)

The 2020–21 Bangladesh Women's Football League, also known as the Tricotex Bangladesh Women's Football League 2020–21 due to sponsorship reasons, it was the 4th season of the Bangladesh Women's Football League, the top level of women's football in Bangladesh, since its establishment in 2011. The tournament started on 31 March. Bashundhara Kings are the defending champions.

The Women's Football League has been postponed indefinitely on 5 April 2021, as the Bangladesh government decided to enforce a seven-day lockdown in the country.

== Venue ==
Due to the COVID-19 pandemic, all matches were held at the BSSS Mostafa Kamal Stadium in Dhaka, Bangladesh.

Dhaka	Dhaka is located in Bangladesh
BSSS Mostafa Kamal Stadium	Dhaka is located in Bangladesh
Capacity: 25,000	Dhaka is located in Bangladesh

== Teams ==
=== Clubs and locations ===
The Bangladesh Football Federation (BFF) have confirmed the following eight participants will contest the league:

Locations of the 2020–21 Bangladesh Women's Football League teams

Team	Location
ARB College Sporting Club	Noakhali
Bashundhara Kings	Dhaka
Cumilla United	Cumilla
FC Brahmanbaria	Brahmanbaria
Jamalpur Kacharipara Akadas	Jamalpur
Kachijhuli Sporting Club	Mymensingh
Nasrin Sporting Club	Dhaka
Suddopuskorini Jubo SC	Rangpur

=== Personnel and sponsoring ===
Team	Head coach	Captain	Kit manufacturer	Shirt sponsor (chest)
ARB College Sporting Club	(Bangladesh) Jahidul Islam Rana	(Bangladesh) Marzia Akhter		Amir Group
Bashundhara Kings	(Bangladesh) Abu Faisal Ahmed	(Bangladesh) Sabina Khatun	Club manufactured kit	Bashundhara Group
Cumilla United	(Bangladesh) Nazrul Islam Belal	(Bangladesh) Rumki Akter		
FC Brahmanbaria	(Bangladesh) Suehlamong	(Bangladesh) Maynu Marma	Graphics Bird	
Jamalpur Kacharipara Akadas	(Bangladesh) Jafar Ahmed	(Bangladesh) Sadia Akter		
Kachijhuli Sporting Club				
Nasrin Sporting Club				
Suddopuskorini Jubo SC	(Bangladesh) Md. Milon Khan	(Bangladesh) Mst. Runa Akhter	Graphics Bird	

== League table ==
Pos	Team	Pld	W	D	L	GF	GA	GD	Pts	Qualification
1	Bashundhara Kings	14	14	0	0	123	1	+122	42	Champion
2	ARB College	14	12	0	2	76	6	+70	36	Runner-up
3	FC Brahmanbaria	14	7	3	4	21	32	−11	24	
4	Cumilla United	14	5	3	6	15	34	−19	18	
5	Jamalpur Kacharipara XI	14	5	1	8	22	52	−30	16	
6	Nasrin SC	14	5	1	8	18	64	−46	16	
7	Kachijhuli SC	14	2	2	10	10	47	−37	8	Expelled (Note: Kachijhuli Sporting Club didn't play three matches in a row and gave walkover to the opponents. The disciplinary committee first gave them a 'Show Cause' notice and later expelled them from rest of the league. The opponents of their remaining matches awarded 3–0 victory.)
8	Suddopuskorini Jubo SC	14	1	0	13	14	63	−49	3	

Source: SofaScore

== Results ==
Home \ Away	ARBSC	BKW	CU	FCB	JKXI	KSC	NSC	SJSC
ARB College Sporting Club	—	0–1	7–0	8–2	9–0	11–0	6–0	6–0
Bashundhara Kings	3–0	—	9–0	6–0	19–0		20–0	14–1
Cumilla United	0–4	0–6	—	0–1	0–0		1–2	2–1
FC Brahmanbaria	0–7	0–6	1–1	—	3–1	1–1	0–4	1–0
Jamalpur Kacharipara Akadas	3–0	0–5		0–1	—		3–0	5–0
Kachijhuli Sporting Club		0–11	1–1		3–4	—		
Nasrin Sporting Club	4–0	0–16	2–1	2–2	0–2	0–2	—	5–3
Suddopuskorini Jubo SC	0–11	0–5	0–5	2–3	3–4	3–1	2–3	—

Updated to match(es) played on unknown. Source: SofaScore
Legend: Blue = home team win; Yellow = draw; Red = away team win.

== Positions by round ==
Team ╲ Round	1	2	3	4	5	6	7	8	9	10	11	12	13	14
ARB College Sporting Club	2	2	2	2	2	2	2	2	2	2	2	2	2	2
Bashundhara Kings	1	1	1	1	1	1	1	1	1	1	1	1	1	1
Cumilla United	7	4	3	3	5	5	5	5	4	4	4	5	5	4
FC Brahmanbaria	4	3	4	4	3	4	4	3	3	3	3	3	3	
Jamalpur Kacharipara Akadas	5	6	7	6	7	7	7	7	7	7	6	6	6	5
Kachijhuli Sporting Club	3	5	6	7	6	6	6	6	6	6	7	7	7	7
Nasrin Sporting Club	6	7	5	5	4	3	3	4	5	5	4	4	4	6
Suddopuskorini Jubo SC	8	8	8	8	8	8	8	8	8	8	8	8	8	8

Leader & Champion
Runner Up

Source: SofaScore

== Goalscorers ==
There were 299 goals scored in 56 matches, for an average of 5.34 goals per match.

28 goals

- (Bangladesh) Krishna Rani Sarkar (Bashundhara Kings)

27 goals

- (Bangladesh) Sabina Khatun (Bashundhara Kings)

14 goals

- (Bangladesh) Anuching Mogini (ARB College Sporting Club)

11 goals

- (Bangladesh) Shaheda Akter Ripa (ARB College Sporting Club)
- (Bangladesh) Mosammat Sirat Jahan Shopna (Bashundhara Kings)
- (Bangladesh) Shamsunnahar Jr. (Bashundhara Kings)

10 goals

- (Bangladesh) Marzia (ARB College Sporting Club)

7 goals

- (Bangladesh) Anika Tanjum (ARB College Sporting Club)
- (Bangladesh) Sheuli Azim (Bashundhara Kings)
- (Bangladesh) Tonima Biswas (Suddopuskorini Jubo SC)
- (Bangladesh) Ritu Porna Chakma (Bashundhara Kings)

6 goals

- (Bangladesh) Sapna Rani (ARB College Sporting Club)
- (Bangladesh) Tohura Khatun (Bashundhara Kings)

5 goals

- (Bangladesh) Halima Akter (ARB College Sporting Club)
- (Bangladesh) Rojina Aktar (Cumilla United)
- (Bangladesh) Sadia Akter (FC Brahmanbaria)

4 goals

- (Bangladesh) Ela Moni (FC Brahmanbaria)
- (Bangladesh) Mossamat Eti (ARB College Sporting Club)
- (Bangladesh) Munmun Akter (FC Brahmanbaria)
- (Bangladesh) Mst Shopna Akter (Nasrin Sporting Club)
- (Bangladesh) Monika Chakma (Bashundhara Kings)
- (Bangladesh) Sanjida Akhter (Bashundhara Kings)
- (Bangladesh) Maria Manda (Bashundhara Kings)
- (Bangladesh) Aklima Khatun (ARB College Sporting Club)

3 goals

- (Bangladesh) Lipi Akter (Jamalpur Kacharipara Akadas)
- (Bangladesh) Nasrin Akter (ARB College Sporting Club)
- (Bangladesh) Sita Rani Chandra (Nasrin Sporting Club)
- (Bangladesh) Sajeda Khatun (ARB College Sporting Club)
- (Bangladesh) Mrs Shikha Akhter (Kachijhuli Sporting Club)
- (Bangladesh) Shamsunnahar (Bashundhara Kings)
- (Bangladesh) Malene Chakma (Jamalpur Kacharipara Akadas)
- (Bangladesh) Rehana Akter (Cumilla United)
- (Bangladesh) Shirin Akter (Nasrin Sporting Club)

2 goals

- (Bangladesh) Sumaiya Akter (Bashundhara Kings)
- (Bangladesh) Akhi Akter (Cumilla United)
- (Bangladesh) Unnoti Khatun(ARB College Sporting Club)
- (Bangladesh) Jannatul Islam Rumi (Nasrin Sporting Club)
- (Bangladesh) Marufa Akhter (Kachijhuli Sporting Club)
- (Bangladesh) Mrs Amena Khatun (Kachijhuli Sporting Club)
- (Bangladesh) Shohely Sharmin Sharabony (Jamalpur Kacharipara Akadas)
- (Bangladesh) Ratna (Jamalpur Kacharipara Akadas)
- (Bangladesh) Sohagi Kisku (ARB College Sporting Club)
- (Bangladesh) Kanon Rani (Jamalpur Kacharipara Akadas)
- (Bangladesh) Joynob Bibi Rita (Suddopuskorini Jubo SC)
- (Bangladesh) Bipasha Mali (Jamalpur Kacharipara Akadas)
- (Bangladesh) Ratna Akter (Jamalpur Kacharipara Akadas)

1 goal

- (Bangladesh) Mosammat Sultana (Bashundhara Kings)
- (Bangladesh) Kolpona (Kachijhuli Sporting Club)
- (Bangladesh) Marufa Akter (Kachijhuli Sporting Club)
- (Bangladesh) Bonna Akter (FC Brahmanbaria)
- (Bangladesh) Lipi Akter (Cumilla United)
- (Bangladesh) Kursia Jannat (Nasrin Sporting Club)
- (Bangladesh) Mst Airin (Nasrin Sporting Club)
- (Bangladesh) Sumi Khatun (Cumilla United)
- (Bangladesh) Masura Parvin (Bashundhara Kings)
- (Bangladesh) Sabrina Akter Suma (Kachijhuli Sporting Club)
- (Bangladesh) Nasrin Akter (Suddopuskorini Jubo SC)
- (Bangladesh) Shila Akhter (Suddopuskorini Jubo SC)
- (Bangladesh) Surovi Akhter Eity (Jamalpur Kacharipara Akadas)
- (Bangladesh) Akhi Khatun (Bashundhara Kings)
- (Bangladesh) Selina Khatun (FC Brahmanbaria)
- (Bangladesh) Kohati Kisku (ARB College Sporting Club)
- (Bangladesh) Mahfuza Khatun (ARB College Sporting Club)
- (Bangladesh) Afeida Khandaker (ARB College Sporting Club)
- (Bangladesh) Soma Akter (Suddopuskorini Jubo SC)
- (Bangladesh) Sultana Akter (Bashundhara Kings)
- (Bangladesh) Rojina Akter (Cumilla United)
- (Bangladesh) Moinu Marma (FC Brahmanbaria)
- (Bangladesh) Sumi (FC Brahmanbaria)
- (Bangladesh) Ripa Akter (ARB College Sporting Club)
- (Bangladesh) Kakoli Akter (ARB College Sporting Club)

=== Own goals ===
† Bold Club indicates winner of the match

Player	Club	Opponent	Result	Date
(Bangladesh) Kanon Rani	Jamalpur Kacharipara Akadas	Nasrin Sporting Club	0–3	24 May 2021
(Bangladesh) Kumari Sumi Rani	Nasrin Sporting Club	Bashundhara Kings	0–20	8 June 2021
(Bangladesh) Khaleda Khatun	Jamalpur Kacharipara Akadas	FC Brahmanbaria	1–3	21 June 2021
