= 2021–22 Bangladesh Women's Football League =

5th season of the Bangladesh Women's Football League

Bangladesh Women's Football League
- Season: 2021–22
- Dates: 15 November–31 December 2022
- Champions: Bashundhara Kings (3rd title)
- Matches: 66
- Goals: 331 (5.02 per match)
- Best player: (Bangladesh) Shaheda Akter Ripa (ARB College Sporting Club)
- Top goalscorer: 25 goals (Bangladesh) Aklima Khatun (ARB College Sporting Club)
- Biggest home win: ARB College Sporting Club 14–0 Nasrin Sporting Club (07 December 2022)
- Biggest away win: FC Brahmanbaria Women 0–19 Bashundhara Kings Women (25 December 2022)
- Highest scoring: FC Brahmanbaria Women 0–19 Bashundhara Kings Women (25 December 2022)
- Longest winning run: 11 matches Bashundhara Kings
- Longest unbeaten run: 11 matches Bashundhara Kings
- Longest winless run: 7 matches Nasrin Sporting Club
- Longest losing run: 11 matches Farashganj SC Women

The 2021–22 Bangladesh Women's Football League, also known as the Bashundhara Group Bangladesh Women's Football League 2021–22 due to sponsorship reason. It was the 5th season of the Bangladesh Women's Football League, the top level of women's football in Bangladesh, since its establishment in 2011. The league was commenced on 15 November 2022 and ended on 31 December 2022.

Bashundhara Kings Women won the current 2021–22 season title.

== Venue ==
All matches were played at the BSSS Mostafa Kamal Stadium in Dhaka, Bangladesh

Dhaka	Dhaka is located in Bangladesh
BSSS Mostafa Kamal Stadium	Dhaka is located in Bangladesh
Capacity: 25,000	Dhaka is located in Bangladesh

== Teams ==
=== Clubs and locations ===
The following twelve participants were participated in the league.

Locations of the 2021–22 Bangladesh Women's Football League teams

Team	Location
ARB College Sporting Club	Noakhali
Bashundhara Kings	Dhaka
Barishal Football Academy	Barishal
Cumilla United	Cumilla
Dhaka Rangers FC	Dhaka
Farashganj SC	Dhaka Farashganj
FC Brahmanbaria	Brahmanbaria
Jamalpur Kacharipara Akadas	Jamalpur
Nasrin Sporting Club	Dhaka
Siraj Srity Songsod	Rajshahi
Saddapuskuruni Jubo SC	Rangpur
Uttara FC	Dhaka Uttara

=== Personnel and sponsoring ===
Team	Head coach	Captain	Kit manufacturer	Shirt sponsor (chest)
ARB College Sporting Club	(Bangladesh) Golam Rayhan Bapon	(Bangladesh) Sohagi Kisku		Amir Group
Bashundhara Kings	(Bangladesh) Syed Golam Jilani	(Bangladesh) Sabina Khatun	Club manufactured kit	Bashundhara Group
Barishal Football Academy	(Bangladesh) Md Asraful Haque	(Bangladesh) Ela Moni		Fortune Barishal
Cumilla United	(Bangladesh) Swapon Kumar Das	(Bangladesh) Rony Akter	Sarker's Design	
Dhaka Rangers FC	(Bangladesh) Asia Khatun Bithi	(Bangladesh) Bonna Akter		
Farashganj SC	(Bangladesh) Khokon Dash	(Bangladesh) Mahlaching Marma Riki		
FC Brahmanbaria	(Bangladesh) Md Johir Iqbal	(Bangladesh) Md Ayub Ali		
Jamalpur Kacharipara Akadas	(Bangladesh) Md Jafar Ahmed	(Bangladesh) Sofia Khatun		Smart Technologies (BD) Ltd.
Nasrin Sporting Club	(Bangladesh) Shahdat Hossain	(Bangladesh) Mst Shopna Akter		
Suddopuskorini Jubo SC	(Bangladesh) Shamim Khan Miskin	(Bangladesh) Mossamat Sultana	BIRD	
Siraj Srity Songsod	(Bangladesh) Md Shahiduzzaman	(Bangladesh) Nusrat Jahan Mitu		
Uttara FC	(Bangladesh) Md Mahbub Ali Manik	(Bangladesh) Surovi Akter Eity		

== League table ==
Pos	Team	Pld	W	D	L	GF	GA	GD	Pts	Qualification
1	Bashundhara Kings	11	11	0	0	100	1	+99	33	Champion
2	ARB College SC	11	10	0	1	71	5	+66	30	Runner-up
3	Uttara FC Women	11	7	2	2	25	7	+18	23	
4	Siraj Srity Songsod	11	6	1	4	29	15	+14	19	
5	Barishal Football Academy	11	5	0	6	24	18	+6	15	
6	Nasrin Sporting Club	11	4	3	4	18	39	−21	15	
7	Cumilla United	11	3	4	4	12	26	−14	13	
8	Suddopuskorini Jubo SC	11	4	1	6	17	33	−16	13	
9	Jamalpur Kacharipara Akadas	11	4	1	6	12	38	−26	13	
10	FC Brahmanbaria	11	3	2	6	15	47	−32	11	
11	Dhaka Rangers FC	11	1	2	8	6	47	−41	5	
12	Farashganj SC Women	11	0	0	11	2	55	−53	0	

Source: Azscore

== Results ==
No Home \ No Away	ARBSC	BKW	CU	FCB	JKXI	DRFC	NSC	SJSC	BFA	UFCW	FSCW	SSS
ARB College Sporting Club	—	0–2	6–0	8–0	9–0	6–1	14–0	8–1	3–1	1–0	12–0	4–0
Bashundhara Kings	2–0	—	12–0	19–0	7–0	12–0	11–0	10–1	5–0	2–0	13–0	7–0
Cumilla United	0–6	0–12	—	0–2	3–0	0–0	5–1	1–1	0–2	1–1	2–1	0–0
FC Brahmanbaria	0–8	0–19	2–0	—	2–3	1–1	1–1	1–3	2–1	1–6	4–0	1–5
Jamalpur Kacharipara Akadas	0–9	0–7	0–3	3–2	—	4–0	1–1	2–0	0–4	0–5	2–0	0–6
Dhaka Rangers FC	1–6	0–12	0–0	1–1	0–4	—	1–6	1–4	0–6	0–3	2–0	0–5
Nasrin Sporting Club	0–14	0–11	1–5	1–1	1–1	6–1	—	2–0	2–0	0–0	5–0	0–6
Suddopuskorini Jubo SC	1–8	1–10	1–1	3–1	0–2	4–1	0–2	—	2–5	1–3	2–0	1–0
Barishal Football Academy	1–3	0–5	2–0	1–2	4–0	6–0	0–2	5–2	—	1–2	4–0	0–2
Uttara FC	0–1	0–2	1–1	6–1	5–0	3–0	0–0	3–1	2–1	—	4–0	1–0
Farashganj SC	0–12	0–13	1–2	0–4	0–2	0–2	0–5	0–2	0–4	0–4	—	1–5
Siraj Srity Songsod	0–4	0–7	0–0	5–1	6–0	5–0	6–0	0–1	2–0	0–1	5–1	—

Source: azscore
Legend: Blue = left column team win; Yellow = draw; Red = top row team win.

== Positions by round ==
Team ╲ Round	1	2	3	4	5	6	7	8	9	10	11
ARB College Sporting Club	1	1	2	2	2	2	2	2	2	2	2
Bashundhara Kings	4	2	1	1	1	1	1	1	1	1	1
Cumilla United	7	8	8	6	4	4	5	8	8	9	7
FC Brahmanbaria	2	4	3	4	5	6	4	6	7	8	10
Jamalpur Kacharipara Akadas	10	6	7	9	10	7	9	9	10	10	9
Dhaka Rangers FC	6	7	9	11	11	10	11	11	11	11	11
Nasrin Sporting Club	5	5	5	7	7	9	10	10	9	7	6
Suddopuskorini Jubo SC	8	10	10	8	9	11	8	7	5	6	8
Barishal Football Academy	3	3	4	5	6	8	6	4	6	5	5
Uttara FC	9	9	6	3	3	3	3	3	3	3	3
Farashganj SC	11	12	12	12	12	12	12	12	12	12	12
Siraj Srity Songsod	12	11	11	10	8	5	7	5	4	4	4

Leader & Champion
Runner Up

Source: azscore

=== Results by games ===
Team ╲ Round	1	2	3	4	5	6	7	8	9	10	11
ARB College Sporting Club	W	W	W	W	W	W	W	W	W	W	L
Bashundhara Kings	W	W	W	W	W	W	W	W	W	W	W
Cumilla United	D	L	D	W	W	D	L	L	L	D	W
FC Brahmanbaria	W	D	W	L	D	L	W	L	L	L	L
Jamalpur Kacharipara Akadas	L	W	D	L	L	W	L	L	L	W	W
Dhaka Rangers FC	D	D	L	L	L	W	L	L	L	L	L
Nasrin Sporting Club	W	D	D	L	D	L	L	L	W	W	W
Suddopuskorini Jubo SC	L	L	D	W	L	L	W	W	W	L	L
Barishal Football Academy	W	W	L	L	L	L	W	W	L	W	L
Uttara FC	L	D	W	W	W	D	W	W	W	L	W
Farashganj SC	L	L	L	L	L	L	L	L	L	L	L
Siraj Srity Songsod	L	L	L	W	W	W	L	W	W	D	W

Source: azscore
W = Win; D = Draw; L = Lose

== Season statistics ==
=== Goalscorers ===
There have been 331 goals scored in 66 matches, for an average of 5.02 goals per match.

25 goals

- (Bangladesh) Aklima Khatun (ARB Sporting Club)

19 goals

- (Bangladesh) Sabina Khatun (Bashundhara Kings)

12 goals

- (Bangladesh) Mosammat Sirat Jahan Shopna (Bashundhara Kings)

11 goals

- (Bangladesh) Krishna Rani Sarkar (Bashundhara Kings)

10 goals

- (Bangladesh) Shaheda Akter Ripa (ARB Sporting Club)
- (Bangladesh) Anuching Mogini (Bashundhara Kings)
- (Bangladesh) Shamsunnahar Jr. (Bashundhara Kings)
- (Bangladesh) Mst. Sagorika (FC Brahmanbaria)

8 goals

- (Bangladesh) Ritu Porna Chakma (Bashundhara Kings)
- (Bangladesh) (Japan) Matsushima Sumaya (Bashundhara Kings)
- (Bangladesh) Airin (Nasrin Sporting Club)

7 goals

- (Bangladesh) Sadia Akter (Uttara FC Women)
- (Bangladesh) Sapna Rani (ARB Sporting Club)
- (Bangladesh) Lipi Akter (Uttara FC Women)

6 goals

- (Bangladesh) Nasrin (Suddopuskorini Jubo SC)
- (Bangladesh) Mahfuza Khatun (ARB Sporting Club)
- (Bangladesh) Ela Moni (Barishal Football Academy)

5 goals

- (Bangladesh) Sanjida Akhter (Bashundhara Kings)
- (Bangladesh) Trishna Rani (Siraj Srity Songsod)
- (Bangladesh) Kursia Jannat (Nasrin Sporting Club)
- (Bangladesh) Sultana (Suddopuskorini Jubo SC)

4 goals

- (Bangladesh) Mirona (ARB Sporting Club)
- (Bangladesh) Sinha (Barishal Football Academy)
- (Bangladesh) Afroza (Jamalpur Kacharipara Akadas)
- (Bangladesh) Kanon (Siraj Srity Songsod)
- (Bangladesh) Prity (Siraj Srity Songsod)

3 goals

- (Bangladesh) Unnoti Khatun (ARB Sporting Club)
- (Bangladesh) Roaja (Cumilla United)
- (Bangladesh) Thuinuye Marma (Siraj Srity Songsod)
- (Bangladesh) Shaheda (ARB Sporting Club)
- (Bangladesh) Marzia (Bashundhara Kings)
- (Bangladesh) Maria Manda (Bashundhara Kings)
- (Bangladesh) Liva (Siraj Srity Songsod)
- (Bangladesh) Rojena Akter (Uttara FC Women)
- (Bangladesh) Munki (Siraj Srity Songsod)

2 goals

- (Bangladesh) Tohura Khatun (Bashundhara Kings)
- (Bangladesh) Akhi Khatun (Bashundhara Kings)
- (Bangladesh) Rupa (ARB Sporting Club)
- (Bangladesh) Joynob Bibi Rita (Siraj Srity Songsod)
- (Bangladesh) Shahanag (Jamalpur Kacharipara Akadas)
- (Bangladesh) Afeida Khandaker (ARB Sporting Club)
- (Bangladesh) Amena (FC Brahmanbaria)
- (Bangladesh) Selina (Uttara FC Women)
- (Bangladesh) Rubina (FC Brahmanbaria)
- (Bangladesh) Parul (Uttara FC Women)
- (Bangladesh) Mitu (Siraj Srity Songsod)
- (Bangladesh) Kohati Kisku (ARB Sporting Club)
- (Bangladesh) Nowson Jahan (ARB Sporting Club)
- (Bangladesh) Sajeda Khatun (Barishal Football Academy)
- (Bangladesh) Marufa (Barishal Football Academy)
- (Bangladesh) Sanjida (Jamalpur Kacharipara Akadas)
- (Bangladesh) Jannatul (Jamalpur Kacharipara Akadas)
- (Bangladesh) Sheuli Azim (Bashundhara Kings)
- (Bangladesh) Tonima Biswas (Uttara FC Women)

1 goal

- (Bangladesh) Rehena Akter (Barishal Football Academy)
- (Bangladesh) Raposhsi (Barishal Football Academy)
- (Bangladesh) Tania (Barishal Football Academy)
- (Bangladesh) Rafaza (Dhaka Rangers FC)
- (Bangladesh) Rupa (Suddopuskorini Jubo SC)
- (Bangladesh) Monika Chakma (Bashundhara Kings)
- (Bangladesh) Kranuching (Dhaka Rangers FC)
- (Bangladesh) Munmun (Uttara FC Women)
- (Bangladesh) Irishna (Jamalpur Kacharipara Akadas)
- (Bangladesh) Kakoli (Suddopuskorini Jubo SC)
- (Bangladesh) Oyeshi (Siraj Srity Songsod)
- (Bangladesh) Riki (Farashganj SC Women)
- (Bangladesh) Maria (Cumilla United)
- (Bangladesh) Shipra (Cumilla United)
- (Bangladesh) Ripa (Cumilla United)
- (Bangladesh) Sumi (Cumilla United)
- (Bangladesh) Halima (ARB Sporting Club)
- (Bangladesh) Rima (Cumilla United)
- (Bangladesh) Machaiu (Cumilla United)
- (Bangladesh) Simi (Nasrin Sporting Club)
- (Bangladesh) Fatema (FC Brahmanbaria)
- (Bangladesh) Rony (Cumilla United)
- (Bangladesh) Mariyam (Dhaka Rangers FC)
- (Bangladesh) Shohagi (ARB Sporting Club)
- (Bangladesh) Dipa (Barishal Football Academy)
- (Bangladesh) Nargis (Bashundhara Kings)
- (Bangladesh) Tonni (Uttara FC Women)
- (Bangladesh) Roja (Siraj Srity Songsod)
- (Bangladesh) Shila (Suddopuskorini Jubo SC)
- (Bangladesh) Kakoli (Barishal Football Academy)
- (Bangladesh) Sajeda (Barishal Football Academy)
- (Bangladesh) Sikha (Barishal Football Academy)
- (Bangladesh) Poly (Barishal Football Academy)
- (Bangladesh) Taniya (Barishal Football Academy)
- (Bangladesh) Masura Parvin (Bashundhara Kings)
- (Bangladesh) Rupna Chakma (Bashundhara Kings)
- (Bangladesh) Momita (Siraj Srity Songsod)
- (Bangladesh) Eti (Dhaka Rangers FC)
- (Bangladesh) Mehenaj (Nasrin Sporting Club)
- (Bangladesh) Shirin (Nasrin Sporting Club)
- (Bangladesh) Irishna Rani (Jamalpur Kacharipara Akadas)
- (Bangladesh) Chonda (Barishal Football Academy)
- (Bangladesh) Senari Chakma (Nasrin Sporting Club)
- (Bangladesh) Sinthiya (Nasrin Sporting Club)
- (Bangladesh) Mohona (Dhaka Rangers FC)
- (Bangladesh) Purnima (Cumilla United)
- (Bangladesh) Trasna Sorda (Cumilla United)
- (Bangladesh) Somali (Farashganj SC Women)
- (Bangladesh) Shamsunnahar Sr. (Bashundhara Kings)

Source: BFF

=== Own goals ===
† Bold Club indicates winner of the match

Player	Club	Opponent	Result	Date
(Bangladesh) Moni Das	Farashganj SC Women	ARB Sporting Club	0–12	19 November 2022
(Bangladesh) Somali	Farashganj SC Women	ARB Sporting Club	0–12	19 November 2022
(Bangladesh) Ruma	Suddopuskorini Jubo SC	ARB Sporting Club	1–8	3 December 2022
(Bangladesh) Moni Das	Farashganj SC Women	Dhaka Rangers FC	0–2	9 December 2022
(Bangladesh) Joynob	Siraj Srity Songsod	Suddopuskorini Jubo SC	0–1	14 December 2022

=== Hat-tricks ===
Player	For	Against	Result	Date	Ref
(Bangladesh) Mst. Sagorika	FC Brahmanbaria	Farashganj SC Women	4–0	16 November 2022	
(Bangladesh) Mirona	ARB Sporting Club	Farashganj SC Women	12–0	19 November 2022	
(Bangladesh) Krishna Rani Sarkar ^{4}	Bashundhara Kings	Farashganj SC Women	13–0	25 November 2022	
(Bangladesh) Ripa ^{4}	ARB Sporting Club	Dhaka Rangers FC	6–1	25 November 2022	
(Bangladesh) Mosammat Sirat Jahan Shopna ^{4}	Bashundhara Kings	Dhaka Rangers FC	12–0	30 November 2022	
(Bangladesh) Sabina Khatun	Bashundhara Kings	Dhaka Rangers FC	12–0	30 November 2022	
(Bangladesh) Sadia	Uttara FC Women	Jamalpur Kacharipara Akadas	5–0	1 December 2022	
(Bangladesh) Aklima Khatun ^{8}	ARB Sporting Club	Nasrin Sporting Club	14–0	7 December 2022	
(Bangladesh) Anuching Mogini ^{4}	Bashundhara Kings	Suddopuskorini Jubo SC	10–1	7 December 2022	
(Bangladesh) Aklima Khatun ^{6}	ARB Sporting Club	Jamalpur Kacharipara Akadas	9–0	13 December 2022	
(Bangladesh) Sabina Khatun ^{4}	Bashundhara Kings	Nasrin Sporting Club	11–0	13 December 2022	
(Bangladesh) Anuching Mogini	Bashundhara Kings	Nasrin Sporting Club	11–0	13 December 2022	
(Bangladesh) (Japan) Matsushima Sumaya	Bashundhara Kings	Nasrin Sporting Club	11–0	13 December 2022	
(Bangladesh) Aklima Khatun ^{4}	ARB Sporting Club	Cumilla United	6–0	17 December 2022	
(Bangladesh) Shamsunnahar Jr ^{5}	Bashundhara Kings	Jamalpur Kacharipara Akadas	7–0	17 December 2022	
(Bangladesh) Sanjida	Bashundhara Kings	Cumilla United	12–0	21 December 2022	
(Bangladesh) Airin	Nasrin Sporting Club	Farashganj SC Women	5–0	23 December 2022	
(Bangladesh) Shultana	Suddopuskorini Jubo SC	Dhaka Rangers FC	4–1	23 December 2022	
(Bangladesh) Sabina Khatun ^{8}	Bashundhara Kings	FC Brahmanbaria Women	19–0	25 December 2022	
(Bangladesh) Krishna Rani Sarkar	Bashundhara Kings	FC Brahmanbaria Women	19–0	25 December 2022	
(Bangladesh) Anuching Mogini	Bashundhara Kings	FC Brahmanbaria Women	19–0	25 December 2022	
(Bangladesh) Prity	Siraj Srity Songsod	FC Brahmanbaria Women	5–1	29 December 2022	

^{n} Player scored n goals.

== See also ==
- 2021–22 Bangladesh Premier League
- 2022 AFC Women's Club Championship
