= 2011–12 Bangladesh Women's Football League =

1st season of the Bangladesh Women's Football League

Bangladesh Women's Football League
- Season: 2011–12
- Dates: 28 September – 14 October 2011
- Champions: Sheikh Jamal Dhanmondi Club Women
- Matches: 10
- Goals: 94 (9.4 per match)
- Best Player: Sui Nu Pru Marma (Dhaka Mohammedan Women)
- Top goalscorer: 25 goals Sabina Khatun (Sheikh Jamal Dhanmondi Club Women)

The 2011–12 Bangladesh Women's Football League, also known as the Walton Dhaka Metropolis Women's Football League 2011 due to sponsorship reasons, it was the 1st season of domestic women's club football competition in Bangladesh hosted and organized by the Bangladesh Football Federation (BFF). Eight teams participated in the tournament.

Sheikh Jamal Dhanmondi Club Women are current champions. The club defeated Dhaka Mohammedan Women by 2–0 on 14 October 2011 to lift the trophy for the first time.

== Venue ==
Dhaka
Bangabandhu National Stadium
Capacity: 36,000
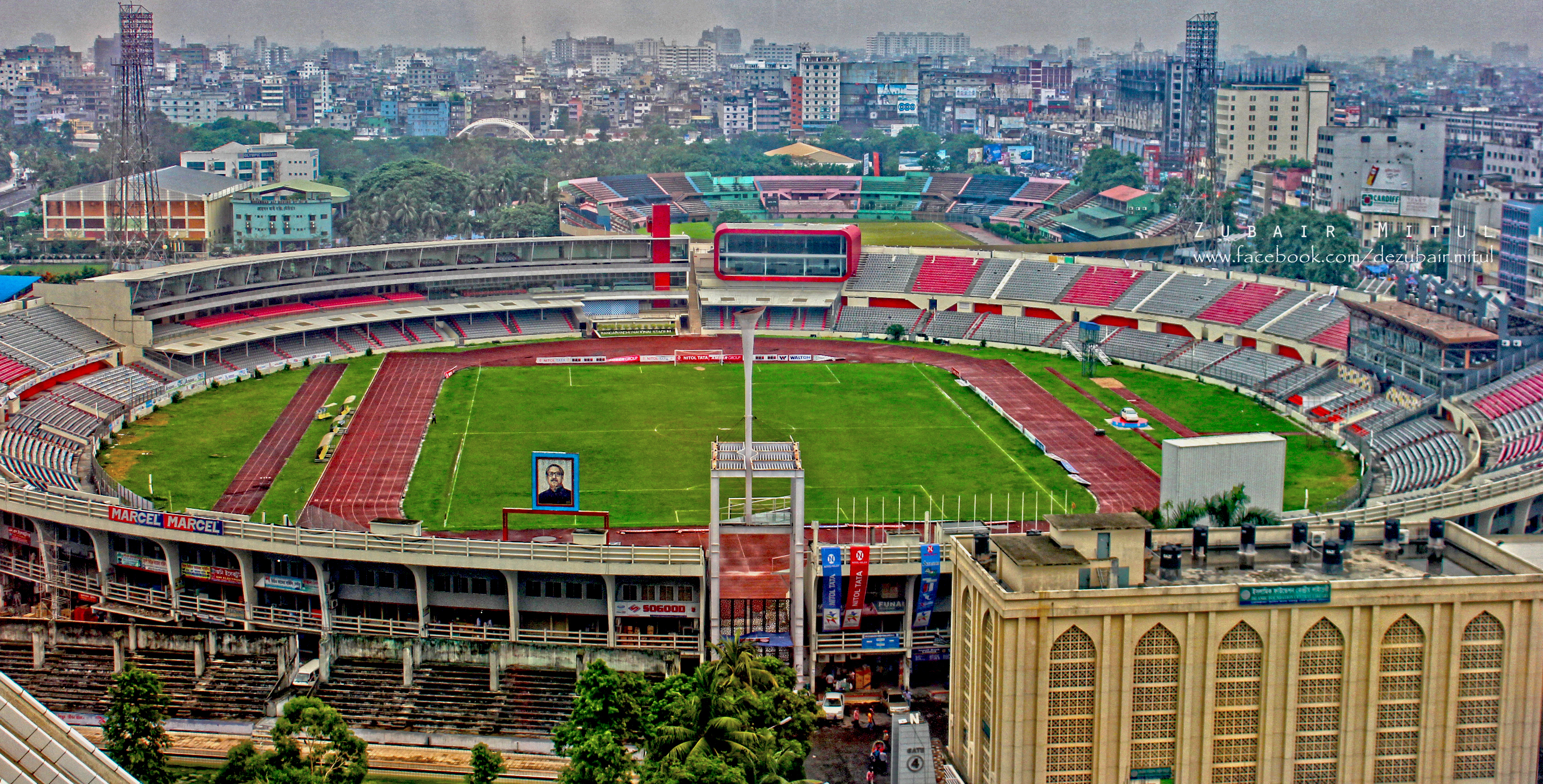

== Participating teams ==
The following eight teams were contested in the tournament.

Team	Appearances	Previous best performance
Arambagh KS Women	1st	
Brothers Union Women		
Dhaka Mohammedan Women	1st	
Dipali Jubo Sangha	1st	
Dhaka Wanderers Club Women		
Farashganj SC Women	1st	
Sheikh Jamal Dhanmondi Club Women	1st	
Wari Club Women	1st	

== Group summary ==
Group A	Group B
Arambagh KS Women	Brothers Union Women
Dipali Jubo Sangha	Dhaka Mohammedan Women
Sheikh Jamal DC Women	Dhaka Wanderers Club Women
Wari Club Women	Farashganj SC Women

== Round and dates ==
Dates/Year	Round	Match dates
27 September – 14 October 2011	Group stages	
27 September – 14 October 2011	Semi-finals	
27 September – 14 October 2011	Final	14 October

== Group stages ==
=== Group A ===
Group A
Pos	Team	Pld	W	D	L	GF	GA	GD	Pts
1	Sheikh Jamal DC Women	3	3	0	0	43	0	+43	9
2	Dipali Jubo Sangha	3	2	0	1	12	5	+7	6
3	Wari Club Women	3	1	0	2	4	17	−13	3
4	Arambagh KS Women	3	0	0	3	2	39	−37	0

28 September 2011	Sheikh Jamal DC Women	4-0	Dipali Jubo Sangha

30 September 2011	Wari Club Women	4-1	Arambagh KS Women

5 October 2011	Sheikh Jamal DC Women	26-0	Arambagh KS Women

5 October 2011	Dipali Jubo Sangha	3-0	Wari Club Women

8 October 2011	Sheikh Jamal DC Women	13-0	Wari Club Women

8 October 2011	Dipali Jubo Sangha	9-1	Arambagh KS Women

=== Group B ===
Group B
Pos	Team	Pld	W	D	L	GF	GA	GD	Pts
1	Dhaka Mohammedan Women	1	1	0	0	12	0	+12	3
2	Farashganj SC Women	1	0	0	1	0	12	−12	0
3	Brothers Union Women	0	0	0	0	0	0	0	0 (Note: Brothers Union Women - Withdrew from the league)
4	Dhaka Wanderers Club Women	0	0	0	0	0	0	0	0 (Note: Dhaka Wanderers Club Women - Withdrew from the league)

4 October 2011	Dhaka Mohammedan Women	12-0	Farashganj SC Women

== Semi finals ==
Date	Match	Result
11 October 2011	Sheikh Jamal DC Women - Farashganj SC Women	16–0
12 October 2011	Dhaka Mohammedan Women - Dipali Jubo Sangha	3–0

== Final ==
Date	Match	Result
14 October 2011	Dhaka Mohammedan Women - Sheikh Jamal DC Women	0–2

== Winners ==
1st Bangladesh Women's Football League 2011–12
Winners
Sheikh Jamal Dhanmondi Club Women
First Title
