= Kachijhuli Sporting Club =

Bangladeshi Women's Football club

- Full name: Kachijhuli Sporting Club
- Short name: KSC
- Founded: March 20, 2021; 4 years ago
- Ground: Bir Sherestha Shaheed Shipahi Mostafa Kamal Stadium
- Capacity: 25,000
- President: Md Shariful Islam
- Head coach: AKM Delwar Hossain
- League: Bangladesh Women's Football League
- 2020–21: BWFL, 8 of 8

Kachijhuli Sporting Club (Bengali: কাঁচিঝুলি স্পোর্টিং ক্লাব) was a professional Bangladeshi Women's association football club from Mymensingh. The club was founded in 2021 and last played in the Bangladesh Women's Football League.

== History ==
The club was established on 20 March 2021, ahead of the 2020–21 Bangladesh Women's Football League. In second phase of the league, the club was expelled due to abandoning three matches.

== BWFL performance by year ==
Years	Played	Win	Draw	Loss	Goals for	Goals against
2020–21	14	2	2	10	10	47
2021–22	Did not participate					
Overall	14	2	2	10	10	47

== Top goalscorers by season ==
As of 8 July 2021

Season	Player	Matches	Goals	Ref
2020–21	(Bangladesh) Shikha Akter	10	3	

== Head coach's record ==
As of 19 July 2021

Head coach	From	To	P	W	D	L	GF	GA	%W
(Bangladesh) AKM Delwar Hossain Mokul	7 January 2021	N/A	14	2	2	10	10	47	14.29
