= Barishal Football Academy Women =

Bangladeshi association football club

- Full name: Barishal Football Academy Women
- Short name: BFA
- Founded: 10 January 2020; 5 years ago
- Ground: Bir Sherestha Shaheed Shipahi Mostafa Kamal Stadium
- Capacity: 25,000
- President: Al Amin Biswas
- Head coach: Md Ashraful Haque Apel
- League: Bangladesh Women's Football League
- 2021–22: BWFL, 5th of 11

Barishal Football Academy Women (Bengali: বরিশাল ফুটবল একাডেমি নারী দল) was a Bangladeshi women's football club based in Barishal that competed in the Bangladesh Women's Football League, the top flight of women's football in Bangladesh.

== History ==
Barishal Football Academy was founded on 10 January 2020. The club first competed in the 2021–22 Bangladesh Women's Football League. Barishal FA played their debut game against Jamalpur Kacharipara Akadas on 17 November, which was won by 4–0.

== Squad (2022) ==
Note: Flags indicate national team as defined under FIFA eligibility rules; some limited exceptions apply. Players may hold more than one non-FIFA nationality.

No.	Pos.	Nation	Player
1	GK	BAN	Jui Akter
2	DF	BAN	Mehenur Akter
3	DF	BAN	Mst Nargis Khatun
4	GK	BAN	Tania
5	MF	BAN	Mst Lutfora Akter Lima
6	DF	BAN	Dipa Khatun
7	FW	BAN	Rehena Akther
8	DF	BAN	Ronjona Rani
9	FW	BAN	Sinha Jahan Shikha
10	FW	BAN	Sajeda Khatun
11	FW	BAN	Ela Moni (captain)
12	FW	BAN	Mst Kakoli Akter
13	FW	BAN	Taposi Uchisim
14	MF	BAN	Marufa Akter

No.	Pos.	Nation	Player
15	MF	BAN	Bithika Kisku
16	DF	BAN	Mafuiching Marma
17	DF	BAN	Tanisha Akter
18	DF	BAN	Chondana Rani
19	MF	BAN	Mst Munni Akter
20	FW	BAN	Fahima Akther Swarna
21	FW	BAN	Sajeda Khatun
22	GK	BAN	Sopna Akther Jili
23	GK	BAN	Owama Marma
24	MF	BAN	Nuha Akter Suma
25	DF	BAN	Mithila Rani Sarkar Joln
26	FW	BAN	Poli Akter
28	DF	BAN	Eity Akther Riya
30	GK	BAN	Tule Roy

== Competitive record ==
As of 29 December 2022

Season	Division	League								League top scorer(s)	
Season	Division	P	W	D	L	GF	GA	Pts	Position	Players	Goals
2021–22	BWFL	11	5	0	6	24	18	15	5	(Bangladesh) Ela Moni	6

== Head coach's record ==
As of 31 December 2022

Head coach	From	To	P	W	D	L	GF	GA	%W
(Bangladesh) Md Ashraful Haque Apel	10 November 2022	N/A	11	5	0	6	24	18	45.45

== Club management ==
=== Technical staff (2022) ===
Position	Name
Head Coach	(Bangladesh) Ashraful Haque Apel
Assistant coach	(Bangladesh) Suehla Mong Marma
Goalkeeping coach	(Bangladesh) Moly Akter
Media manager	(Bangladesh) Md Razu Ahmed Sumon
Physio	(Bangladesh) Renesa Farah Anny

=== Board of directors (2022) ===
Position	Name
Governing Body Chairman	(Bangladesh) Syed Rezaul Karim
Executive Committee President	(Bangladesh) Al Amin Biswas
General secretary	(Bangladesh) Md Saiful Islam Sokal
