= 2012–13 Bangladesh Women's Football League =

2nd season of the Bangladesh Women's Football League

Bangladesh Women's Football League
- Season: 2012–13
- Dates: 23 February – 30 March 2013
- Champions: Dhaka Abahani Women
- Matches: 12
- Goals: 129 (10.75 per match)
- Best Player: (Bangladesh) Sabina Khatun (Dhaka Mohammedan Women)
- Top goalscorer: 29 goals (Bangladesh) Aungmraching Marma (Dhaka Abahani Women)

The 2012–13 Bangladesh Women's Football League, also known as the Walton Dhaka Metropolis Women's Football League 2013 due to sponsorship reason, it was the 2nd season of domestic women's club football competition in Bangladesh organized by Bangladesh Football Federation (BFF). The 8 teams were participated in the tournament.

Dhaka Abahani Women are current champions. The club have defeated Dhaka Mohammedan Women by 3–1 on 5 March 2013 to lift the trophy for the first time.

== Venue ==
Dhaka
Bangabandhu National Stadium
Capacity: 36,000
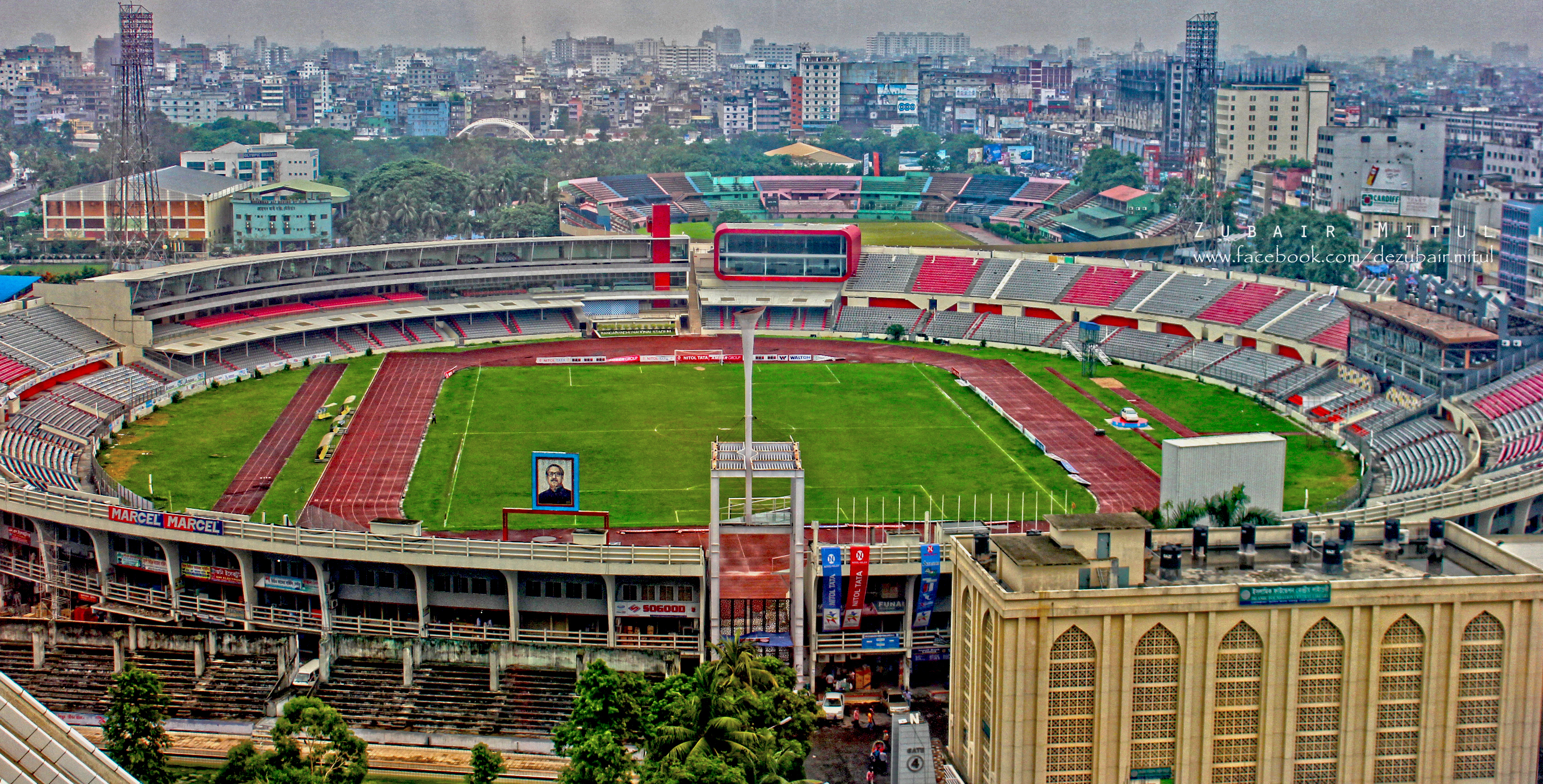

== Participating teams ==
The following eight teams will contest in the tournament.

Team	Appearances	Previous best performance
Dhaka Abahani Women	1st	
Arambagh KS Women	2nd	
Bangladesh Police FC Women	1st	
Dipali Jubo Sangha		
Feni SC Women	1st	
Jatrabari Krira Sangha	1st	
Dhaka Mohammedan Women	2nd	Runners-up (2011)
Nasrin Sports Academy	1st	

== Group summary ==
Group A	Group B
Arambagh KS Women	Bangladesh Police FC Women
Dipali Jubo Sangha	Dhaka Abahani Women
Jatrabari Krira Sangha	Feni SC Women
Dhaka Mohammedan Women	Nasrin Sports Academy

== Round and dates ==
Dates/Year	Round	Match dates
23 February – 30 March 2013	Group stages	23 February – 2 March 2013
23 February – 30 March 2013	Semi-finals	27 March
23 February – 30 March 2013	Final	30 March

== Group stages ==
Key to colours in group tables
Group winners and runners-up advance to the Knockout-stage
Later withdrew

Tiebreakers

Teams were ranked according to points (3 points for a win, 1 point for a draw, 0 points for a loss), and if tied on points, the following tie-breaking criteria were applied, in the order given, to determine the rankings.

1. Points in head-to-head matches among tied teams;
2. Goal difference in head-to-head matches among tied teams;
3. Goals scored in head-to-head matches among tied teams;
4. If more than two teams are tied, and after applying all head-to-head criteria above, a subset of teams are still tied, all head-to-head criteria above are reapplied exclusively to this subset of teams;
5. Goal difference in all group matches;
6. Goals scored in all group matches;
7. Penalty shoot-out if only two teams were tied and they met in the last round of the group;
8. Disciplinary points (yellow card = 1 point, red card as a result of two yellow cards = 3 points, direct red card = 3 points, yellow card followed by direct red card = 4 points);
9. Drawing of lots.

=== Group A ===
Pos	Team	Pld	W	D	L	GF	GA	GD	Pts	Status
1	Dhaka Mohammedan Women	2	2	0	0	30	0	+30	6	Advance to Knockout stage
2	Arambagh KS Women	2	1	0	1	2	17	−15	3	Advance to Knockout stage
3	Jatrabari Krira Sangha	2	0	0	2	1	16	−15	0	
4	Dipali Jubo Sangha	0	0	0	0	0	0	0	0	Later withdrew

Updated to match(es) played on unknown. Source:

=== Group B ===
Pos	Team	Pld	W	D	L	GF	GA	GD	Pts	Status
1	Dhaka Abahani Women	3	3	0	0	56	0	+56	9	Advance to Knockout stage
2	Feni SC Women	3	2	0	1	8	10	−2	6	Advance to Knockout stage
3	Nasrin Sports Academy	3	1	0	2	5	34	−29	3	
4	Bangladesh Police FC Women	3	0	0	3	2	27	−25	0	

Updated to match(es) played on unknown. Source:

== Knockout stage ==
- In the knockout stages, if a match finished goalless at the end of normal playing time, extra time would have been played (two periods of 15 minutes each) and followed, if necessary, by a penalty shoot-out to determine the winner.

=== Bracket ===
Semi-finals
27 March–Dhaka
Dhaka Mohammedan Women	15
Feni SC Women	0
27 March–Dhaka
Dhaka Abahani Women	6
Arambagh KS Women	0

Final
30 March–Dhaka
Dhaka Abahani Women	3
Dhaka Mohammedan Women	1

== Winners ==
2nd Bangladesh Women's Football League 2012–13
Winners
Dhaka Abahani Women
First Title

== Statistics ==
=== Goalscorers ===
There were 129 goals scored in 12 matches, for an average of 10.8 goals per match.

29 goals

- (Bangladesh) Aungmraching Marma (Dhaka Abahani Women)

28 goals

- (Bangladesh) Sabina Khatun (Dhaka Mohammedan Women)

14 goals

- (Bangladesh) Munmun Akter (Dhaka Abahani Women)

9 goals

- (Bangladesh) Suraiya Akter (Dhaka Abahani Women)

6 goals

- (Bangladesh) Sharmin Akter Rupa (Dhaka Abahani Women)

5 goals

- (Bangladesh) Shanto (Dhaka Mohammedan Women)

4 goals

- (Bangladesh) Mirona (Dhaka Mohammedan Women)

3 goals

- (Bangladesh) Bithi Akter (Dhaka Mohammedan Women)
- (Bangladesh) SNP Marma (Dhaka Abahani Women)
- (Bangladesh) Runa Mali (Feni SC Women)

2 goals

- (Bangladesh) Mainui Marma (Dhaka Abahani Women)
- (Bangladesh) Rony Akter(Feni SC Women)
- (Bangladesh) Milli Mali (Feni SC Women)
- (Bangladesh) SN Mong (Nasrin Sports Academy)
- Sumi (Bangladesh Police FC Women)

1 goal

- (Bangladesh) Rehena Akter (Dhaka Abahani Women)
- (Bangladesh) Badly Khatun (Dhaka Mohammedan Women)
- (Bangladesh) Janu Akter (Dhaka Mohammedan Women)
- (Bangladesh) Putul (Dhaka Abahani Women)
- (Bangladesh) NC Marma (Dhaka Mohammedan Women)
- (Bangladesh) Bilkis (Dhaka Mohammedan Women)
- (Bangladesh) Lizu (Dhaka Mohammedan Women)
- (Bangladesh) Shuma (Feni SC Women)
- (Bangladesh) Bandana (Nasrin Sports Academy)
- (Bangladesh) Mahmuda (Nasrin Sports Academy)
- (Bangladesh) Ritu (Nasrin Sports Academy)
- (Bangladesh) Aklima (Arambagh KS Women)
- (Bangladesh) Margia (Arambagh KS Women)
- (Bangladesh) Sharmin (Jatrabari Krira Sangha)
