= Bangladesh Police FC Women =

Bangladeshi association women's football club

Bangladesh Police Women
- Full name: Bangladesh Police Football Club Women
- Short name: PFC
- Founded: 2013; 13 years ago
- Ground: Bir Sherestha Shaheed Shipahi Mostafa Kamal Stadium
- Capacity: 25,000
- Owner: Bangladesh Police
- Head coach: Wali Faisal
- League: Bangladesh Women's Football League
- 2025–26: BWFL, 4th of 11
Home colours	Away colours

Active departments of Farashganj SC
- Football (Men's): Football (women's)

Bangladesh Police FC Women (Bengali: বাংলাদেশ পুলিশ এফসি নারী), is a professional women's football club from Dhaka. They participate in the Bangladesh Women's Football League, the premier women's football league in Bangladesh.

== History ==
The Bangladesh Police first formed a women's football team to participate in the 2012–13 Bangladesh Women's Football League. After 2012–13 season, they did not participate till 2025.

After 4 seasons, The Bangladesh Police formed a women's football team to participate in the 2025–26 Bangladesh Women's Football League. Deputy Police Commissioner, Kazi Nasrin Edib Luna served as the team's manager, while former Bangladesh national team player, Wali Faisal was appointed as the coach. On 29 December 2025, the team played their comeback league game against Bangladesh Army, losing 2–0.

== Current squad ==
As of 29 December 2025

Note: Flags indicate national team as defined under FIFA eligibility rules; some limited exceptions apply. Players may hold more than one non-FIFA nationality.

No.	Pos.	Nation	Player
1	GK	BAN	Taslima
2	DF	BAN	Ronjona Rani
3	DF	BAN	Arifa Akter
4	DF	BAN	Mst Surma Jannat
5	DF	BAN	Kohati Kisku
6	DF	BAN	Josna
7	FW	BAN	Sanjida Akhter (Captain)
8	MF	BAN	Airin Khatun
9	FW	BAN	Mst Eilamoni Akter Eila
10	FW	BAN	Mst. Sagorika
11	FW	BAN	Sabina Akter Rubi
12	DF	BAN	Mst Antora Khatun
13	DF	BAN	Chondona Rani
14	DF	BAN	Mst Jhinuk
15	DF	BAN	Suria Begum

No.	Pos.	Nation	Player
16	FW	BAN	Juma
17	MF	BAN	Marufa Akter
18	MF	BAN	Tusty Rani
19	FW	BAN	Mst Sultana Akter
20	MF	BAN	Munne
21	MF	BAN	Brasti Rani
22	GK	BAN	Yasmin Akther
23	GK	BAN	Hira
24	FW	BAN	Rozana Bintyrezvi
25	DF	BAN	Maitri Rani Basanti
28	FW	BAN	Sanjida Akter Sadia
30	MF	BAN	Sadia Afrin
33	GK	BAN	Durga Preya Dol
66	MF	BAN	Bina Pahan
71	FW	BAN	Nusrat Jahan
77	FW	BAN	Suraiya Akter
88	FW	BAN	Most Jahanara Parvin
90	FW	BAN	Mst Sabina Yasmin

== Competitive record ==
As of 13 February 2026

Season	Division	League								League top scorer(s)	
Season	Division	P	W	D	L	GF	GA	Pts	Position	Players	Goals
2025–26	BWFL	10	6	1	3	46	15	19	4	(Bangladesh) Mst. Sagorika	13

== Head coach's record ==
As of 13 February 2026

Head coach	From	To	P	W	D	L	GS	GA	%W
(Bangladesh) Wali Faisal	10 November 2025	Present	10	6	1	3	46	15	60.00

== Club management ==
=== Technical staff ===
Position	Name
Head coach	(Bangladesh) Wali Faisal
Assistant coach	(Bangladesh) Shamim Al Mamun
Goalkeeper coach	(Bangladesh) Azam Khan
Team manager	(Bangladesh) Kazi Nusrin Edib Luna
Assistant manager	(Bangladesh) Rakibul Hasan
Physio	(Bangladesh) Md Azad Sharif Sujon
Assistant physio	(Bangladesh) Barsha
