= Dhaka Rangers FC Women =

Bangladeshi association football club

Dhaka Rangers Women
- Full name: Dhaka Rangers Football Club Women
- Short name: DRFC
- Founded: 2022
- Ground: Bir Sherestha Shaheed Shipahi Mostafa Kamal Stadium
- Capacity: 25,000
- President: Ohada Sultana Lovely
- Head coach: Md Shofiqul Hasan Polash
- League: Bangladesh Women's Football League
- 2025–26: BWFL, 8th of 11

Dhaka Rangers Football Club Women (Bengali: ঢাকা রেঞ্জার্স ফুটবল ক্লাব নারী), commonly known as Dhaka Rangers, is a Bangladeshi women's professional football club from Dhaka. They participate in the Bangladesh Women's Football League, the women's premier league in Bangladesh.

== History ==
Dhaka Rangers FC was founded in 2022. The club first competed in the 2021–22 Bangladesh Women's Football League. They have played their first official game on 16 November 2022 against Cumilla United, which ended in a 0–0 draw.

== Current squad ==
As of 1 January 2026

Note: Flags indicate national team as defined under FIFA eligibility rules; some limited exceptions apply. Players may hold more than one non-FIFA nationality.

No.	Pos.	Nation	Player
1	GK	BAN	Mst Kobita Akter
2	DF	BAN	Most Mousumi Akter
4	DF	BAN	Mst Santona Akther
8	MF	BAN	Mst Mimi Khatun
10	FW	BAN	Taniya Taniya
11	MF	BAN	Mst Golapi Akter Surovi
12	FW	BAN	Eka Rani Das
14	FW	BAN	Mst Tanzina Akther
15	FW	BAN	Bristy Roy Joyi
17	FW	BAN	Kakoli Rani
18	FW	BAN	Rumita Hasda
19	FW	BAN	Ratna Roy
22	GK	BAN	Mst Homayra Akther Himi
23	GK	BAN	Shefa Akter Sane Asma
24	FW	BAN	Onanna Rani Sutradhar
28	DF	BAN	Sree Monira Soren
33	GK	BAN	Jim Akter
34	DF	BAN	Prionty Dey
37	DF	BAN	Mst Suborna Akter

No.	Pos.	Nation	Player
42	DF	BAN	Rupali Ray Rupa
43	DF	BAN	Rupa
44	MF	BAN	Kalpana Akter (Captain)
47	MF	BAN	Mst Ratna Khatun
82	DF	BAN	Mst Roksana Begum
83	DF	BAN	Mst Sumona Akter
90	FW	BAN	Mst Lipi Akter
91	FW	BAN	Mst Lipi Begum
92	MF	BAN	Suniya Akther Sati
93	MF	BAN	Sri Moti Trishna Rani
94	FW	BAN	Mst Papiya Akter
95	FW	BAN	Mst Pingki Akter
96	FW	BAN	Mst Mim Khatun
99	MF	BAN	Zuma

== Competitive record ==
As of 13 February 2025

Season	Division	League								League top scorer(s)	
Season	Division	P	W	D	L	GF	GA	Pts	Position	Players	Goals
2021–22	BWFL	11	1	2	8	6	47	5	11	(Bangladesh) Mst Rafaza Khatun (Bangladesh) Mst Mohona Tabassum Munira (Bangladesh) Eti Akter (Bangladesh) Marium (Bangladesh) Kranuching Marma	1
2023–24	BWFL	8	2	1	5	12	29	7	7	(Bangladesh) Kalpona Akter	7
2025–26	BWFL	10	3	0	7	15	55	9	8	(Bangladesh) Rumi Hasda	5

== Head coach's record ==
As of 13 February 2026

Head coach	From	To	P	W	D	L	GF	GA	%W
(Bangladesh) Asia Khatun Bithi	12 October 2022	25 February 2024	11	1	2	8	6	47	9.09
(Bangladesh) Md Shofiqul Hasan Polash	3 March 2024	Present	18	5	1	12	27	84	27.78

== Club management ==
=== Technical staff ===
Position	Name
Technical director	(Bangladesh) Md Mahbub Ali Manik
Team manager	(Bangladesh) Raihan Ahmed Shawon
Assistant manager	(Bangladesh) Md Mithu Mia
Head coach	(Bangladesh) Md Shofiqul Hasan Polash
Assistant coach	(Bangladesh) Miraj
Goalkeeping coach	(Bangladesh) Md Myzidul Islam
Media officer	(Bangladesh) Maruf
Doctor	(Bangladesh) Syed Shamim Ahsan
Masseur	(Bangladesh) Md Fahim Hasan
Team officials	(Bangladesh) Yunus
Equipment manager	(Bangladesh) Rubel
