= Munki Akhter =

Bangladeshi footballer

Personal information
- Date of birth: 5 December 2008 (age 17)
- Height: 1.45 m (4 ft 9 in)
- Position: Midfielder

Team information
- Current team: Rajshahi Stars
- Number: 15

Senior career*
Years	Team	Apps	(Gls)
2023–2024	ARB College	8	(3)
2025–	Rajshahi Stars	9	(4)

International career^{‡}
2022–2024	Bangladesh U17		
2024–	Bangladesh U20	16	(10)
2024–	Bangladesh	16	(1)
Medal record
Women's football
Representing Bangladesh
SAFF Women's Championship
Winner	2024 Nepal
SAFF U-20 Women's Championship
Runner-up	2026 Bangladesh
Winner	2025 Bangladesh
Winner	2024 Bangladesh
- * Club domestic league appearances and goals as of 19 February 2026 ‡ National team caps and goals as of 7 April 2026

Munki Akhter (Bengali: মুনকি আখতার IPA: [munki akʰtaɾ]; born 5 December 2008) is a Bangladeshi professional footballer who plays as a midfielder for Bangladesh Women's League club Rajshahi Stars and the Bangladesh national team.

== Club career ==
=== ARB College ===
Munki played for ARB College in the Bangladesh Women's Football League. During the 2020–21 season of the Bangladesh Women's Football League, the club finished as the runner-up of the season.

=== Rajshahi Stars ===
On 22 December 2025, she joined Rajshahi Stars for the 2025–26 Bangladesh Women's Football League.

== International career ==
=== Youth ===
In the 2025 SAFF U-20 Women's Championship, she scored three goals and helped her team clinch the championship. In the same year, her team qualified for the 2026 AFC U-20 Women's Asian Cup, with her scoring a goal against Laos.

She scored the first hat-trick for the team against Bhutan in 2026 SAFF U-19 Women's Championship.

=== Senior ===
In October 2024, Munki Akhter was named in the Bangladesh squad for the 2024 SAFF Women's Championship, where the team retained their title with a 2–1 victory over Nepal in the final.

Bangladesh qualified for the AFC Women's Asian Cup for the first time in history by finishing top of Group C in the qualifiers. The team secured dominant victories over Bahrain (7–0), Myanmar (2–1), and Turkmenistan (7–0), collecting all nine points from three matches. Their historic qualification was confirmed following a 2–2 draw between Bahrain and Turkmenistan. In the tournament, Munki contributed by scoring one of Bangladesh's seven goals against Bahrain.

== Career statistics ==
=== International ===
As of match played 5 July 2025

Scores and results list Bangladesh's goal tally first, score column indicates score after each Munki Akhter goal.

List of international goals scored by Munki Akhter
No.	Date	Venue	Opponent	Score	Result	Competition
1	29 June 2025	Thuwunna Stadium, Yangon, Myanmar	Bahrain	7–0	7–0	2026 AFC Women's Asian Cup qualification

== Honours ==
Rajshahi Stars

- Bangladesh Women's Football League: 2025–26

Bangladesh

- SAFF Women's Championship: 2024

Bangladesh U20

- SAFF U-20 Women's Championship: 2024, 2025
