= Dipali Jubo Sangha =

Association football club in Bangladesh

- Founded: 1960; 65 years ago
- General secretary: Shariful Azam Bhuiyan
- League: Dhaka Third Division League
- 2022–23: Third Division League 8th of 15
Home colours	Away colours

Dipali Jubo Sangha (Bengali: দিপালী যুব সংঘ) is a Bangladeshi football club based in the Dhaka. It currently competes in the Dhaka Third Division League, the fifth-tier of Bangladeshi football.

== History ==
The club was founded in 1960 in Dhaka. They finished runners-up in the Pioneer League in 1993, and entered the Dhaka Third Division League. Under head coach, Kamal Babu, the club would accomplish consecutive promotions within a span of a year, finishing runners-up in the Third Division and Second Division in the 2001 and 2002 editions, respectively.

Eventually, they would finish joint runners-up with Farashganj SC in the 2003–04 First Division, and enter the top-tier, from the 2005 Premier Division season. The club would finish their maiden top-flight season bottom of the table and failed to register a single victory. They earned two points the entire season, with their first coming in an 1–1 draw with Dhaka Wanderers in the league's seventh round. Following their relegation, they would participate in the 2007–08 Senior Division, which served as the new second-tier after the introduction of the professional league. They again failed to register a single victory, and were further demoted to the Second Division.

In 2012, the club were relegated to the Third Division, in their first season back in the Second Division. The club were amidst controversy, when the club's president, Arif Khan Joy, who was also at the time deputy minister for youth and sports and BFF vice-president, entered the dugout during a Third Division fixture against Arambagh Football Academy. This action violated tournament regulations, which state that only club officials with accreditation cards issued by the BFF or the league committee are eligible to remain in the dugout. Following this incident, Arambagh president Mominul Haque Sayeed alleged that the referee had been influenced by the minister’s presence.

== Honours ==
- Dhaka First Division League
  - Runners-up (1): 2003–04
- Dhaka Second Division League
  - Runners-up (1): 2002
- Dhaka Third Division League
  - Runners-up (1): 2001
- Pioneer League
  - Runners-up (1): 1993

== See also ==
- List of football clubs in Bangladesh
- History of football in Bangladesh
