= Uttara FC Women =

Bangladeshi association football club

- Full name: Uttara Football Club Women
- Short name: UFCW
- Founded: 2022; 4 years ago
- Ground: Various
- President: Qantara Khaleda Khan
- Head coach: Md Jaman Ahmed
- League: Bangladesh Women's Football League
- 2023–24: BWFL, 8th of 9

Active departments of Uttara FC
- Football (Women's): Football (Men's)

Uttara FC Women (Bengali: উত্তরা এফসি ওমেন) is a Bangladeshi women's professional football club based in Uttara, Dhaka. It competes in the Bangladesh Women's Football League, the top flight of women's football in Bangladesh.

== Squad (2024) ==
Note: Flags indicate national team as defined under FIFA eligibility rules; some limited exceptions apply. Players may hold more than one non-FIFA nationality.

No.	Pos.	Nation	Player
19	MF	BAN	Shilpa Roy
20	MF	BAN	Shaurovi Rani
22	GK	BAN	Meghla Rani Roy
23	DF	BAN	Josna Chakma
29	MF	BAN	Mosa Maniya Khatun
30	FW	BAN	Rumi Rani
31	DF	BAN	Jairun Akter Jubli
36	FW	BAN	Sumaiya Akter Kona
39	FW	BAN	Eka Rani Das
40	FW	BAN	Lipi Akter
41	FW	BAN	Jannatul Ferdous Jinuk
45	FW	BAN	Tusti Rani Das
50	GK	BAN	Hira
60	DF	BAN	Onamika Tripura
65	FW	BAN	Roni Akter

No.	Pos.	Nation	Player
69	FW	BAN	Soniya Akter
70	GK	BAN	Purnima Akter
71	MF	BAN	Surovi Akter Eity
75	FW	BAN	Rojina Akter
76	DF	BAN	Ratri Moni
80	FW	BAN	Sohaly Sharmin
81	FW	BAN	Eila Moni
89	DF	BAN	Kamrun Nahar
90	MF	BAN	Shaila Khatun
91	DF	BAN	Josna
92	DF	BAN	Tania
93	FW	BAN	Sopna
95	FW	BAN	Tnia Akter Rumi
97	DF	BAN	Mas Shoborna (captain)
99	GK	BAN	Easmin Akter Jova

== Competitive record ==
As of 16 May 2024

Season	Division	League								League top scorer(s)	
Season	Division	P	W	D	L	GF	GA	Pts	Position	Players	Goals
2021–22	BWFL	11	7	2	2	25	7	23	3	(Bangladesh) Sadia Akter	7
2023–24	BWFL	8	2	0	6	5	35	6	8	(Bangladesh) Most Eilamoni Akhter Eila (Bangladesh) Josna	2

== Head coach's record ==
As of 27 May 2024

Head coach	From	To	P	W	D	L	GF	GA	%W
(Bangladesh) Md Mahbub Ali Manik	20 October 2022	30 January 2023	11	7	2	2	25	7	63.64
(Bangladesh) Md Jaman Ahmed	2 February 2024	Present	8	2	0	6	5	35	25.00

== Club management ==
=== Technical staff (2024) ===
Position	Name
Director	(Bangladesh) Md Anowar Hosan
Head coach	(Bangladesh) Md Jaman Ahmed
Assistant coach	(Bangladesh) Md Emdadul Haque
Team manager	(Bangladesh) Md Maruf Afsari
Assistant manager	(Bangladesh) Mahmudul Hasan Emon
Kitman	(Bangladesh) Md Sharif Uddin Bhuiyan
Media officer	(Bangladesh) Md Raishul Islam Liton
Physiotherapist	(Bangladesh) Shantono Mollik
Masseur	(Bangladesh) Maruf Rayhan
