= Cumilla United =

Bangladeshi women's association football club

- Full name: Cumilla United
- Founded: 2020; 5 years ago
- Owner: (Bangladesh) Md Fakhruzzaman
- President: (Bangladesh) Md Fakhruzzaman
- Head coach: (Bangladesh) Swapan Kumar Das
- League: Bangladesh Women's Football League
- 2021–22: 7th of 12

Cumilla United (Bengali: কুমিল্লা ইউনাইটেড) is a Bangladeshi Women's association football club based on Cumilla. The club competes in the Bangladesh Women's Football League, the top division of women's football in Bangladesh.

== Current squad ==
As of 10 January 2023

The following squad were named for 2021–22 BWFL season.

Every player in this club are from its own Academy.

Note: Flags indicate national team as defined under FIFA eligibility rules; some limited exceptions apply. Players may hold more than one non-FIFA nationality.

No.	Pos.	Nation	Player
1	GK	BAN	Surodhani Kisku
2	DF	BAN	Shipra Rani
3	DF	BAN	Kobita Rani
4	DF	BAN	Ferdousi Akter Mariya
5	DF	BAN	Rony Akter (Captain)
6	MF	BAN	Tarima Khtun Rima
7	MF	BAN	Mst Sumi Khatun
8	MF	BAN	Bonna Khatun
9	FW	BAN	Juma
10	FW	BAN	Tanzila Afroz Hira
11	MF	BAN	Chosau Rooja
12	MF	BAN	Rupa Akter
13	DF	BAN	Purnima Rani Mondol
14	DF	BAN	Sajeda Akter
15	FW	BAN	Sumaiya Akter Kona
16	DF	BAN	Istiya Jahan Hima
17	FW	BAN	Ripa
18	MF	BAN	Reme Khatun
19	FW	BAN	Tarsna Sarder
20	MF	BAN	Surma Akter
21	FW	BAN	Machaiu Marma
22	GK	BAN	Tasnima Islam Munni
30	GK	BAN	Krishna Chakma
36	GK	BAN	Nisha Khatun
75	FW	BAN	Taslima Akter
99	DF	BAN	Surovi Akter Afrin

== Competitive record ==
As of 31 December 2022

Season	Division	League								League top scorer(s)	
Season	Division	P	W	D	L	GF	GA	Pts	Position	Players	Goals
2021–22	BWFL	11	3	4	4	12	26	13	7	(Bangladesh) Chosau Rooja	3

== Club management ==
=== Current technical staff ===
As of December 2020

Position	Name
Team Leader	(Bangladesh) Md Fakhruzzaman
Head Coach	(Bangladesh) Swapan Kumar Das
Assistant Coach	(Bangladesh) Md Atikur Rahman
Goalkeeper Coach	(Bangladesh) Md Zahidul Islam
Trainer	(Bangladesh) Debashis Kumar Saha
Physio	(Bangladesh) Md Shipon
Team Manager	(Bangladesh) Md Gulzar Rahman Mamun
Media Officer	(Bangladesh) AKM Rafiuzzaman
Technical Director	(Bangladesh) Md Kazi Maruf

== Team record ==
=== Head coach record ===
As of 31 December 2022

Head Coach	From	To	P	W	D	L	GS	GA	%W
(Bangladesh) Nazrul Islam Belal	13 January 2020	15 August 2021	14	5	3	6	15	34	35.71
(Bangladesh) Swapon Kumar Das	8 September 2022	Present	11	3	4	4	12	26	27.27
