= ARB College Sporting Club =

- Full name: Ataur Rahman Bhuiyan College Sporting Club
- Nickname: ARB
- Founded: 2021
- Ground: Bir Sherestha Shaheed Shipahi Mostafa Kamal Stadium
- Capacity: 25,000
- President: Mohammed Fakhrul Islam
- Head coach: Md Goalm Rayhan
- League: Bangladesh Women's Football League
- 2023–24: BWFL, 2nd of 9

ARB College Sporting Club (Bengali: এআরবি কলেজ স্পোর্টিং ক্লাব) is a professional Bangladeshi women's football club from Noakhali. Its a member of the Bangladesh Women's Football League.

== History ==
The club began participating in the 2020–21 Bangladesh Womens Football League season. The club has played inaugural match against Cumilla United on 2 April 2021.

== Competitive record ==
As of 21 May 2024

Season	Division	League								League top scorer(s)	
Season	Division	P	W	D	L	GF	GA	Pts	Position	Players	Goals
2020–21	BWFL	14	12	0	2	76	6	36	2	(Bangladesh) Anuching Mogini	14
2021–22	BWFL	11	10	0	1	71	5	30	2	(Bangladesh) Mst Aklima Khatun	25
2023–24	BWFL	8	6	1	1	48	5	19	2	(Bangladesh) Mosammat Sagorika	15

== Club management ==
=== Technical staff (2024) ===
Position	Name
Head coach	(Bangladesh) Md Golam Rayhan
Assistant coach	(Bangladesh) Md Nurunabi Masum
Team manager	(Bangladesh) Shalina Akther
Goalkeeping coach	(Bangladesh) Robiul Islam Khan Mona
Media officer	(Bangladesh) Mohammad Jahir Uddin
Kitman	(Bangladesh) Shamol Das
Physiotherapist	(Bangladesh) Afsana Shithil

== Head coach's record ==
As of 21 May 2024

Head coach	From	To	P	W	D	L	GF	GA	%W
(Bangladesh) Shahab Uddin	1 January 2021	30 October 2021	14	12	0	2	76	6	85.71
(Bangladesh) Md Golam Rayhan	5 November 2021	Present	18	15	1	2	118	10	83.33

== Honours ==
=== League ===
- Bangladesh Women's Football League
  - Runners-up (3): 2020–21, 2021–22, 2023–24
