= Kachari Para Akadas Unnayan Shangstha =

Bangladeshi Women's Football club

- Full name: Kachari Para Akadas Unnayan Shangstha
- Nickname: JKXI
- Founded: 2006; 20 years ago
- Ground: Bir Sherestha Shaheed Shipahi Mostafa Kamal Stadium
- Capacity: 25,000
- President: Md Nural Islam
- Head coach: Maksudul Amin Rana
- League: Bangladesh Women's Football League
- 2025–26: BWFL, 11th of 11

Kachari Para Akadas Unnayan Shangstha (Bengali: কাচাঁরী পাড়া একাদশ উন্নয়ন সংস্থা) is a Bangladeshi women's professional football club from Jamalpur founded in 2006. It's a member of the Bangladesh Women's Football League.

== History ==
In December 2019, the club announced that they will take part in the 2019–20 Bangladesh Women's League, the top tier professional women's league of Bangladesh.

== Current squad ==
As of 29 December 2025

Note: Flags indicate national team as defined under FIFA eligibility rules; some limited exceptions apply. Players may hold more than one non-FIFA nationality.

No.	Pos.	Nation	Player
1	GK	BAN	Mst Nisha Khatun
3	DF	BAN	Mukti Akter
4	DF	BAN	Lata Bonagi
5	DF	BAN	Abida Islam Asa Moni
6	MF	BAN	Aysha Shamoly
7	FW	BAN	Rishat Akter Munni
8	FW	BAN	Sama
9	FW	BAN	Aklima Akter
10	FW	BAN	Shahanaj Akter
11	FW	BAN	Soheli Sharmin (Captain)
12	DF	BAN	Sheila Khatun
13	FW	BAN	Maksuda Akter
14	DF	BAN	Alma Akter Abisha
15	DF	BAN	Srete Akter
16	MF	BAN	Mst Rattri Khatun Airin
17	DF	BAN	Urmi Akter
18	DF	BAN	Emy Akter
19	MF	BAN	Jannatul Ferdous
20	DF	BAN	Mongoli Bakchi

No.	Pos.	Nation	Player
21	MF	BAN	Mst Rikta Khatun
22	GK	BAN	Mahabuba Hasan Jony
23	FW	BAN	Mst Hafsa
24	DF	BAN	Sabitri Tripura
25	GK	BAN	Sumi Khatun
26	FW	BAN	Kojol Rekha Taniya
27	MF	BAN	Keya Das
28	DF	BAN	Sadhubi Rani Ray Bithi
29	MF	BAN	Mst Meherun Nesa
30	GK	BAN	Bonna Akter
31	DF	BAN	Isha Halima
32	FW	BAN	Marzana Akter Sikha
33	FW	BAN	Shekh Samia Akter
34	GK	BAN	Mst Dola Khatun
35	MF	BAN	Safa Maroa

== Competitive record ==
As of 13 February 2026

Season	Division	League								League top scorer(s)	
Season	Division	P	W	D	L	GF	GA	Pts	Position	Players	Goals
2019–20	BWFL	12	6	1	5	30	39	19	3	(Bangladesh) Sadia	7
2020–21	BWFL	14	5	1	8	22	52	16	5	(Bangladesh) Lipi Akter	3
2021–22	BWFL	11	4	1	6	12	38	13	6	(Bangladesh) Afroza	4
2023–24	BWFL	8	0	0	8	1	73	0	9	(Bangladesh) Rubina Akter	1
2025–26	BWFL	10	0	0	10	4	129	0	11	(Bangladesh) Soheli Sharmin	3

== Head coach's record ==
As of 13 February 2026

Head Coach	From	To	P	W	D	L	GF	GA	%W
(Bangladesh) Asia Khatun Bithi	1 January 2020	20 December 2020	12	6	1	5	30	39	50.00
(Bangladesh) Jafor Ahmed	5 February 2021	10 June 2024	33	9	2	22	35	163	27.27
(Bangladesh) Maksudul Amin Rana	25 September 2025	Present	10	0	0	10	4	129	0.00

== Club management ==
=== Technical staff ===
Position	Name
Team manager	(Bangladesh) Md Shahidul Islam Limon
Assistant manager	(Bangladesh) Md Shafiqul Islam
Head coach	(Bangladesh) Maksudul Amin Rana
Assistant coach	(Bangladesh) Zumur Akter
Goalkeeping coach	(Bangladesh) AKM Golam Shariar Robin
Media officer	(Bangladesh) Md Ziaur Rahman Sumon
Kitman	(Bangladesh) Md Yean Rahman (Bangladesh) Mithun Chandra Sheel
Physiotherapist	(Bangladesh) Jami Akter
Team officials	(Bangladesh) Sanjida
Equipment manager	(Bangladesh) Mst Sumaiya Akter
