= 2024 CAFA U-20 Championship =

CAFA U-20 Championship 2024

Tournament details
- Host country: Kyrgyzstan
- Dates: 5–12 July
- Teams: 6 (from 1 sub-confederation)
- Venue: 1 (in 1 host city)

Final positions
- Champions: Iran (1st title)
- Runners-up: Kyrgyz Republic
- Third place: Uzbekistan
- Fourth place: Tajikistan

Tournament statistics
- Matches played: 9
- Goals scored: 23 (2.56 per match)
- Attendance: 10,351 (1,150 per match)
- Top scorer(s): (Iran) Reza Ghandipour (4 goals)
- Best player: (Iran) Amirmohammad Razaghinia
- Best goalkeeper: (Iran) Arsha Shakouri
- Fair play award: Turkmenistan

The 2024 CAFA U-20 Championship was the 2nd edition of the CAFA U-20 Championship, the international youth football championship organised by Central Asian Football Association for the men's under-20 national teams of Central Asia. Kyrgyzstan hosted the tournament from 5 to 12 July 2024. A total of six teams played in the tournament, with players born on or after 1 January 2004 eligible to participate. It was the first CAFA tournament to implement video assistant referees (VAR).

Uzbekistan were the defending champions having won the inaugural edition. However, their inability to defeat Iran in the group stage resulted in them playing in the third-place playoff which they won. Meanwhile, Iran clinched their first title by defeating host the Kyrgyz Republic 3–0 in the final.

== Participation ==
=== Participating teams ===
All six CAFA member associations entered teams for the final tournament. with Kyrgyzstan debuting in the competition.

Team	Appearance	Last appearance	Previous best performance
Afghanistan	2nd	2023 (Fourth place)	Fourth place (2023)
Iran	2nd	2023 (Runners-up)	Runners-up (2023)
Kyrgyz Republic	1st	Debut	
Tajikistan	2nd	2023 (Third place)	Third place (2023)
Turkmenistan	2nd	2023 (Fifth place)	Fifth place (2023)
Uzbekistan	2nd	2023 (Champions)	Champions (2023)

=== Squads ===
Players born on or after 1 January 2005 and on or before 31 December 2007 were eligible to compete in the tournament.

=== Seeding ===
The 6 teams were drawn into two groups of three teams, with seeding based on their performance at the previous edition. Seeding was shown in parentheses except the team who previously did not participate, which were denoted by (–).

The host Kyrgyz Republic automatically seeded to Pot 1 and placed into the first position of Group A.

Pot 1	Pot 2	Pot 3
Kyrgyzstan (–) (hosts); Uzbekistan (1)	Iran (2); Tajikistan (3)	Afghanistan (4); Turkmenistan (5)

=== Draw ===
The draw took place at 12:00 TJT (UTC+5) on 25 June 2024 and was live-streamed on the Central Asian Football Association's YouTube channel.

The draw resulted in the following groups:

Group A
Pos	Team
A1	Kyrgyz Republic
A2	Tajikistan
A3	Afghanistan

Group B
Pos	Team
B1	Uzbekistan
B2	Iran
B3	Turkmenistan

== Venues ==
All matches were played at the following venue:

2024 CAFA U-20 Championship is located in Kyrgyzstan	Jalal-Abad
2024 CAFA U-20 Championship is located in Kyrgyzstan	Kurmanbek Stadium
2024 CAFA U-20 Championship is located in Kyrgyzstan	Capacity: 5,000

== Match officials ==
The following officials were appointed for the tournament:

Referees

- (Iran) Payam Heidari
- (Iran) Mahsa Ghobrani
- (Kyrgyzstan) Veronika Bernatskaia
- (Kyrgyzstan) Mederbek Taichiev
- (Tajikistan) Nasrullo Kabirov
- (Tajikistan) Sadullo Gulmurodi
- (Turkmenistan) Resul Mämmedow
- (Uzbekistan) Firdavs Norsafarov
- (Uzbekistan) Rustam Lutfullin

Assistant referees

- (Afghanistan) Nangyali Sadat
- (Iran) Farhad Moravveji
- (Kyrgyzstan) Sergei Grishchenko
- (Tajikistan) Akmal Buriev
- (Turkmenistan) Palwan Palwanow
- (Uzbekistan) Bakhtiyorkhuja Shavkatov

== Group stage ==
The match schedule was released on June 25th, after the draw was conducted.

All times are local KGT (UTC+6).

Tiebreakers

Teams were ranked according to points (3 points for a win, 1 point for a draw, 0 points for a loss), and if tied on points, the following tie-breaking criteria were applied, in the order given, to determine the rankings:

1. Points in head-to-head matches among tied teams;
2. Goal difference in head-to-head matches among tied teams;
3. Goals scored in head-to-head matches among tied teams;
4. If more than two teams are tied, and after applying all head-to-head criteria above, a subset of teams are still tied, all head-to-head criteria above are reapplied exclusively to this subset of teams;
5. Goal difference in all group matches;
6. Goals scored in all group matches;
7. Penalty shoot-out if only two teams were tied and they met in the last round of the group;
8. Disciplinary points (yellow card = 1 point, red card as a result of two yellow cards = 3 points, direct red card = 3 points, yellow card followed by direct red card = 4 points);
9. Drawing of lots.

=== Group A ===
Pos	Team	Pld	W	D	L	GF	GA	GD	Pts	Qualification
1	Kyrgyz Republic (H)	2	1	1	0	4	0	+4	4	Final
2	Tajikistan	2	1	1	0	1	0	+1	4	Third place play-off
3	Afghanistan	2	0	0	2	0	5	−5	0	Fifth place play-off

Source: CAFA
Rules for classification: Tiebreakers
(H) Hosts
5 July 2024
22:00

Afghanistan	0–4	Kyrgyz Republic
	Report (KFU); Report (CAFA)	Madaminov 9'; Madanov 60'; Emilbekov 76'; Abdirasulov 86'

Kurmanbek Stadium, Jalal-Abad
Attendance: 1,952
Referee: Resul Mämmedow (Turkmenistan)

7 July 2024
17:30

Tajikistan	1–0	Afghanistan
Daliev 43'	Report (FFT); Report (CAFA)

Kurmanbek Stadium, Jalal-Abad
Attendance: 176
Referee: Mahsa Ghorbani (Iran)

9 July 2024
22:00

Kyrgyz Republic	0–0	Tajikistan
	Report (KFU); Report (FFT); Report (CAFA)

Kurmanbek Stadium, Jalal-Abad
Attendance: 2,832
Referee: Firdavs Norsafarov (Uzbekistan)

=== Group B ===
Pos	Team	Pld	W	D	L	GF	GA	GD	Pts	Qualification
1	Iran	2	1	1	0	4	1	+3	4	Final
2	Uzbekistan	2	1	1	0	4	3	+1	4	Third place play-off
3	Turkmenistan	2	0	0	2	2	6	−4	0	Fifth place play-off

Source: CAFA
Rules for classification: Tiebreakers
5 July 2024
17:30

Turkmenistan	2–3	Uzbekistan
Esenow 15'; Berenow 90' (pen.)	Report (CAFA)	Usmonov 65'; Makhamatov 75' (pen.); Abdullaev 90+4'

Kurmanbek Stadium, Jalal-Abad
Attendance: 957
Referee: Mederbek Taichiev (Kyrgyzstan)

7 July 2024
22:00

Iran	3–0	Turkmenistan
Ghandipour 7'; Homaeifard 28'; Mazraeh 73'	Report (FFIRI); Report (CAFA)

Kurmanbek Stadium, Jalal-Abad
Attendance: 225
Referee: Veronika Bernatskaia (Kyrgyzstan)

9 July 2024
17:30

Uzbekistan	1–1	Iran
Rejabaliev 78' (pen.)	Report (UFA); Report (FFIRI); Report (CAFA)	Hassani 68'

Kurmanbek Stadium, Jalal-Abad
Attendance: 236
Referee: Sadullo Gulmurodi (Tajikistan)

== Play-off stage ==
=== Fifth place play-off ===
11 July 2024
20:00

Afghanistan	1–1	Turkmenistan
Rahimi 76' (pen.)	Report (FFIRI); Report (CAFA)	Garajaýew 72'
Penalties
Shah Raofi (penalty scored); Abdullaye (penalty scored); Rajabi (penalty scored); Moghaddam (penalty missed); Rahimi (penalty scored); Hamidi (penalty scored); Seyedi (penalty missed); Rahmani (penalty scored); Ali Zada (penalty scored); Alokozai (penalty scored)	8–7	(penalty scored) Annamyradow; (penalty scored) Agajumaýew; (penalty scored) Kambarow; (penalty scored) Sarkisýan; (penalty missed) Berenow; (penalty scored) Bekmyradow; (penalty missed) Orazow; (penalty scored) Garajaýew; (penalty scored) Nepesow; (penalty missed) Zülfakar

Kurmanbek Stadium, Jalal-Abad
Attendance: 87
Referee: Nasrullo Kabirov (Tajikistan)

=== Third place play-off ===
12 July 2024
17:00

Uzbekistan	3–0	Tajikistan
Abdullaev 3'; Shukurullaev 53'; Shodiboev 61'	Report (CAFA)

Kurmanbek Stadium, Jalal-Abad
Attendance: 74
Referee: Payam Heidari (Iran)

=== Final ===
12 July 2024
22:00

Kyrgyz Republic	0–3	Iran
	Report (FFIRI); Report (CAFA)	Ghandipour 45+7' (pen.), 49', 58'

Kurmanbek Stadium, Jalal-Abad
Attendance: 3,812
Referee: Rustam Lutfullin (Uzbekistan)

== Goalscorers ==
There were 23 goals scored in 9 matches, for an average of 2.56 goals per match.

4 goals

- (Iran) Reza Ghandipour

2 goals

- (Uzbekistan) Bekhruz Abdullaev

1 goal

- (Afghanistan) Ali Reza Rahimi
- (Iran) Ali Hassani
- (Iran) Alireza Homaeifard
- (Iran) Yousef Mazraeh
- (Kyrgyzstan) Kairat Abdirasulov
- (Kyrgyzstan) Argen Emilbekov
- (Kyrgyzstan) Umar Madaminov
- (Kyrgyzstan) Yryskeldi Madanov
- (Tajikistan) Azizbek Daliev
- (Turkmenistan) Magtymberdi Berenow
- (Turkmenistan) Gurbanmuhammet Esenow
- (Turkmenistan) Gurbangeldi Garajaýew
- (Uzbekistan) Abdushukur Makhamatov
- (Uzbekistan) Meyirbek Rejabaliev
- (Uzbekistan) Shodiyor Shodiboev
- (Uzbekistan) Bekhruz Shukurullaev
- (Uzbekistan) Murodali Usmonov

Source: CAFA

== Awards ==
The following awards were given at the conclusion of the tournament:

Top Goalscorer	Best goalkeeper	Best player	Fair play
(Iran) Reza Ghandipour	(Iran) Arsha Shakouri	(Iran) Amirmohammad Razaghinia	Turkmenistan
