= 2022 CAFA U-19 Championship =

Tournament details
- Host country: Tajikistan
- City: Dushanbe
- Dates: 3–13 August
- Teams: 5 (from 1 sub-confederation)
- Venue(s): (in 1 host city)

Final positions
- Champions: Iran (2nd title)
- Runners-up: Uzbekistan
- Third place: Tajikistan
- Fourth place: Kyrgyzstan

Tournament statistics
- Matches played: 10
- Goals scored: 31 (3.1 per match)
- Attendance: 18,005 (1,801 per match)
- Top scorer(s): (Uzbekistan) Shakhriyor Jabborov (3 goals)
- Best player(s): (Iran) Amin Hazbavi
- Fair play award: Afghanistan

The 2022 CAFA U-19 Championship was the third edition of the CAFA U-19 Championship, the triennial international youth football championship organised by CAFA for the men's under-19 national teams of Central Asia. Tajikistan hosted the tournament from 3 to 16 August 2022. A total of five teams played in the tournament, with players born on or after 1 January 2003 eligible to participate.

Iran were the defending champions, having won their first title in 2019. and they successfully managed to retain the title.

== Participation ==
=== Participating teams ===
A total of 5 (out of 6) CAFA member associations entered teams for the tournament.

Team	App.	Previous best performance
Afghanistan	3rd	Fourth place (2016, 2019)
Iran	2nd	Champions (2019)
Kyrgyzstan	2nd	Runners-up (2016)
Tajikistan	3rd	Runners-up (2019)
Uzbekistan	3rd	Champions (2016)

Did not enter

- Turkmenistan

== Venues ==
Matches were held at the Republic Central Stadium.

Dushanbe	2022 CAFA U-19 Championship (Tajikistan)
Republic Central Stadium	2022 CAFA U-19 Championship (Tajikistan)
Capacity: 20,000	2022 CAFA U-19 Championship (Tajikistan)

== Match officials ==
The following officials were appointed for the tournament:

Referees

- (Afghanistan) Halim Shirzad
- (Iran) Mansourian Morteza
- (Kyrgyzstan) Daiyrbek Abdyldaev
- (Tajikistan) Sayyodjon Zayniddinov
- (Uzbekistan) Firdavs Norsafarov

Assistant referees

- (Afghanistan) Sadat Sayed Nangyali
- (Iran) Ali Ahmadi
- (Kyrgyzstan) Ismailzhan Talipzhanov
- (Tajikistan) Farkhod Kuralov
- (Uzbekistan) Bakhtiyorkhuja Shavkatov

== Main tournament ==
The main tournament schedule was announced on 27 July 2022.

Pos	Team	Pld	W	D	L	GF	GA	GD	Pts	Final result
1	Iran	4	2	2	0	12	4	+8	8	Champions
2	Uzbekistan	4	1	3	0	6	3	+3	6	Runners-up
3	Tajikistan (H)	4	2	0	2	7	9	−2	6	Third place
4	Kyrgyzstan	4	1	2	1	4	5	−1	5	
5	Afghanistan	4	0	1	3	2	10	−8	1	

Source: CAFA
Rules for classification: 1) Points; 2) head-to-head matches; 3) Goal difference; 4) Number of goals scored.
(H) Hosts
5 August 2022
18:00

Uzbekistan	2–2	Iran
Esanov 49'; Jabborov 81'	Report	Hazbavi 87' (pen.); Ebrahimzadeh 90'

Republic Central Stadium, Dushanbe
Attendance: 250
Referee: Daiyrbek Abdyldaev (Kyrgyzstan)
5 August 2022
21:00

Kyrgyzstan	1–0	Afghanistan
Nurmat 35'	Report

Republic Central Stadium, Dushanbe
Attendance: 100
Referee: Firdavs Norsafarov (Uzbekistan)

6 August 2022
18:00

Kyrgyzstan	0–0	Uzbekistan
	Report

Republic Central Stadium, Dushanbe
Attendance: 105
Referee: Halim Shirzad (Afghanistan)
6 August 2022
21:00

Afghanistan	1–4	Tajikistan
Hussaini 20'	Report	Khaitov 13'; Qurbonov 70'; Asoev 78'; Ashurmamadov 89' (pen.)

Republic Central Stadium, Dushanbe
Attendance: 1,700
Referee: Mansourian Morteza (Iran)

8 August 2022
18:00

Iran	4–0	Afghanistan
Ghorbanigavashini 5'; Gendeshmin 44'; Hazbavi 52' (pen.); Fakhrian 78'	Report

Republic Central Stadium, Dushanbe
Attendance: 250
Referee: Sayyodjon Zayniddinov (Tajikistan)
8 August 2022
21:00

Tajikistan	3–1	Kyrgyzstan
Jurabekzoda 40'; Ashurmamadov 80' (pen.); Azizov 90+1'	Report	Baktybekov 70'

Republic Central Stadium, Dushanbe
Attendance: 3,500
Referee: Firdavs Norsafarov (Uzbekistan)

10 August 2022
18:00

Iran	2–2	Kyrgyzstan
Ghorbanigavashini 48'; Pilali 90+6'	Report	Brauzman 33'; Zhenishbekov 54'

Republic Central Stadium, Dushanbe
Attendance: 300
Referee: Sayyodjon Zayniddinov (Tajikistan)
10 August 2022
21:00

Uzbekistan	3–0	Tajikistan
Jabborov 29', 75'; Kholdorkhonov 69'	Report

Republic Central Stadium, Dushanbe
Attendance: 5,500
Referee: Halim Shirzad (Afghanistan)

12 August 2022
18:00

Afghanistan	1–1	Uzbekistan
Ahadi 17'	Report	Tursunpulatov 7'

Republic Central Stadium, Dushanbe
Attendance: 100
Referee: Daiyrbek Abdyldaev (Kyrgyzstan)
10 August 2022
21:00

Tajikistan	0–4	Iran
	Report	Hazbavi 9'; Gendeshmin 14'; Eslamtalab 24'; Shahim 81'

Republic Central Stadium, Dushanbe
Attendance: 6,200
Referee: Firdavs Norsafarov (Uzbekistan)

== Player awards ==
The following awards were given at the conclusion of the tournament:

The ranking for the Top Goalscorer was determined using the following criteria: goals, assists and fewest minutes played.

Top Goalscorer	Best player	Fair Play award	Special award
(Uzbekistan) Shakhriyor Jabborov (3 goals)	(Iran) Amin Hazbavi	Afghanistan	Kyrgyzstan

== Goalscorers ==
There were 31 goals scored in 10 matches, for an average of 3.1 goals per match.

3 goals

- (Iran) Amin Hazbavi
- (Uzbekistan) Shakhriyor Jabborov

2 goals

- (Iran) Erfan Ghorbanigavashini
- (Iran) Saeid Saharkhizan Gendeshmin
- (Tajikistan) Salam Ashurmamadov

1 goal

- (Afghanistan) Ahmad Zakaria Hussaini
- (Afghanistan) Hasibullah Ahadi
- (Iran) Amin Pilali
- (Iran) Amir Ebrahimzadeh
- (Iran) Amir Shahim
- (Iran) Amirreza Eslamtalab
- (Iran) Mojtaba Fakhrian
- (Kyrgyzstan) Bimyrza Zhenishbekov
- (Kyrgyzstan) Irrakhimbek Nurmat Uulu
- (Kyrgyzstan) Khristian Brauzman
- (Kyrgyzstan) Nurbol Baktybekov
- (Tajikistan) Asadbek Jurabekzoda
- (Tajikistan) Azizbek Khaitov
- (Tajikistan) Mehrob Asoev
- (Tajikistan) Sodiqjon Qurbonov
- (Tajikistan) Sunatullo Azizov
- (Uzbekistan) Asliddin Tursunpulatov
- (Uzbekistan) Pulatkhuja Kholdorkhonov
- (Uzbekistan) Sherzod Esanov

Source: CAFA
