= Ashraf Hussainzada =

Afghan football referee

- Full name: Mohammad Ashraf Hussainzada
- Born: Afghanistan

Domestic
Years	League	Role
2024–present	Afghanistan Champions League	Referee

International
Years	League	Role
2025–present	FIFA listed	Referee
2023–present	CAFA	Referee

Mohammad Ashraf Hussainzada is an Afghan football referee who, as of 2025, is the only FIFA-listed central referee from the country. He has mostly been active at CAFA tournaments.

== Career ==
Hussainzada was given the FIFA badge in 2025, following a complete renovation of Afghanistan's FIFA list. He has previously overseen matches in non-FIFA competitions, having a recorded career dating only from 2023 in the inaugural edition of the CAFA U-20 Championship in Tajikistan, organized by the Central Asian Football Association, which is a non-affiliated FIFA confederation grouping teams from Central Asia, including Afghanistan, Kyrgyzstan, Iran, Turkmenistan, Uzbekistan, and Tajikistan. He refereed a single match of the tournament (Tajikistan U-20 4–1 Turkmenistan U-20) at the TALCO Arena in Tursunzoda, as well as being a fourth official at the Uzbekistan U-20 3–2 Iran U-20 match.

Previously to be given FIFA recognition, Hussainzada was active in local football, whose top flight is the Afghanistan Champions League. In a June 2025 ceremony, he was promoted to international refereeing, along roster of other FIFA Afghans, including two assistant referees, a futsal referee, and one for beach soccer tournaments. Hussainzada is the only FIFA-listed central referee from Afghanistan as of 2025, with the previous representative Halim Shirzad not appearing on the new list.

Following his FIFA designation, Hussainzada continued to participate in CAFA competitions, including the 2025 CAFA U-17 Championship, where he refereed a single group stage match between Kyrgyzstan U-17 and Iran U-17 in Tashkent, Uzbekistan. His other match at the tournament was as a fourth (support) referee at the third-place match between Turkmenistan U-17 and Kyrgyzstan U-17.

== Selected international record ==
2023 CAFA U-20 Championship
Date	Match	Result	Venue
21 May 2023	Uzbekistan – Iran	3–2	TALCO Arena (as fourth official)
24 May 2023	Tajikistan – Turkmenistan	4–2	TALCO Arena
2025 CAFA U-17 Championship
24 May 2025	Iran – Kyrgyzstan	3–4	Lokomotiv Stadium
30 May 2025	Turkmenistan – Kyrgyzstan	0–0 (7–6)	Lokomotiv Stadium (as fourth official)
