= 2019 CAFA U-19 Championship =

Tournament details
- Host country: Tajikistan
- City: Dushanbe
- Dates: 9–15 August
- Teams: 5 (from 1 sub-confederation)
- Venue(s): 1 (in 1 host city)

Final positions
- Champions: Iran (1st title)
- Runners-up: Tajikistan
- Third place: Uzbekistan
- Fourth place: Afghanistan

Tournament statistics
- Matches played: 10
- Goals scored: 34 (3.4 per match)
- Attendance: 17,270 (1,727 per match)
- Top scorer(s): (Tajikistan) Rustam Soirov (4 goals)
- Best player(s): (Iran) Amirhossein Nikpour
- Fair play award: Iran

the 2019 CAFA U-19 Championship was the 2nd edition of the CAFA U-19 Championship, the triennial international youth football championship organised by Central Asian Football Association for the men's under-19 national teams of Central Asia. The tournament was held in Dushanbe, Tajikistan from August 9 to August 15, 2019, featuring a total of five participating teams, with players born on or after 1 January 2000 eligible to participate.

Uzbekistan are the defending champions, having defeated Kyrgyz Republic to win the inaugural tournament back in 2016. However, they were unable to defend their title, as Iran dominated, remaining undefeated in all four matches, to claim their maiden trophy.

== Participating teams ==
A total of 5 (out of 6) teams participated in the final tournament. Iran made their debut in the tournament after pulling out of the inaugural edition. However, the runners-up of the 2016 edition, Kyrgyz Republic, were absent from the tournament.

Team	App.	Previous best performance
Afghanistan	2nd	Fourth place (2016)
Iran	1st	debut
Tajikistan	2nd	Fifth place (2016)
Turkmenistan	2nd	Third place (2016)
Uzbekistan	2nd	Champions (2016)

Did not enter

- Kyrgyz Republic

== Venues ==
All Matches were played in the following venue:

Dushanbe	2019 CAFA U-19 Championship (Tajikistan)
Republic Central Stadium	2019 CAFA U-19 Championship (Tajikistan)
Capacity: 20,000	2019 CAFA U-19 Championship (Tajikistan)

== Match officials ==
The following referees and assistant referees were selected to officiate the tournament:

Referees

- (Afghanistan) Halim Aqa Shirzad
- (Iran) Vahid Seyed Kazemi
- (Kyrgyzstan) Nurgazy Cholponbaev
- (Tajikistan) Sayyodjon Zayniddinov
- (Turkmenistan) Arslan Goshanov
- (Uzbekistan) Akhrol Riskullaev

Assistant referees

- (Afghanistan) Sharif Mohd Sarwari
- (Iran) Hassan Zeheiri
- (Kyrgyzstan) Eldiiar Salybaev
- (Tajikistan) Khamza Shoymardonov
- (Turkmenistan) Akmyrat Gurbanov
- (Uzbekistan) Sanjar Shayusupov

== Main tournament ==
The main tournament schedule was announced on 3 August 2019.

Pos	Team	Pld	W	D	L	GF	GA	GD	Pts	Final result
1	Iran	4	3	1	0	9	1	+8	10	Champions
2	Tajikistan (H)	4	2	2	0	11	5	+6	8	Runners-up
3	Uzbekistan	4	1	2	1	6	6	0	5	Third place
4	Afghanistan	4	0	2	2	5	9	−4	2	
5	Turkmenistan	4	0	1	3	3	13	−10	1	

Updated to match(es) played on unknown. Source: CAFA
(H) Hosts
9 August 2019

Afghanistan	2–2	Turkmenistan
Wojdi 10'; Mohammadi 27'	Report	Priýew 17'; Myradow 89'

Republic Central Stadium, Dushanbe
Attendance: 100
Referee: Sayyodjon Zayniddinov (Tajikistan)
9 August 2019
20:00

Uzbekistan	0–2	Iran
	Report	Zavari 50'; Rahimabadi 75'

Republic Central Stadium, Dushanbe
Attendance: 120
Referee: Halim Aqa Shirzad (Afghanistan)

10 August 2019
17:00

Afghanistan	2–2	Uzbekistan
Wojdi 59'; Mohammadi 86'	Report	Shamsiev 11'; Rafaelov 45'

Republic Central Stadium, Dushanbe
Attendance: 200
Referee: Vahid Seyed Kazemi (Iran)
10 August 2019
20:00

Turkmenistan	1–5	Tajikistan
Myratberdiýew 16'	Report	Kamolov 34'; Samiev 75', 90+5'; Soirov 88', 90+2'

Republic Central Stadium, Dushanbe
Attendance: 550
Referee: Akhrol Riskullaev (Uzbekistan)

12 August 2019
17:00

Iran	4–0	Turkmenistan
Barzegar 2'; Zavari 14'; Bizhani 81'; Mousavian 90+2'	Report

Republic Central Stadium, Dushanbe
Attendance: 300
Referee: Nurgazy Cholponbaev (Kyrgyzstan)
12 August 2019
20:00

Tajikistan	3–1	Afghanistan
Zoirov 8'; Samiev 36'; Zabirov 68' (pen.)	Report	Azizi 90+4'

Republic Central Stadium, Dushanbe
Attendance: 1,200
Referee: Arslan Goshanov (Turkmenistan)

13 August 2019
17:00

Iran	2–0	Afghanistan
Barzegar 34', 71'	Report

Republic Central Stadium, Dushanbe
Attendance: 300
Referee: Sayyodjon Zayniddinov (Tajikistan)
13 August 2019
20:00

Uzbekistan	2–2	Tajikistan
Abdumajidov 30'; Yuldoshev 62'	Report	Kamolov 5'; Soirov 77'

Republic Central Stadium, Dushanbe
Attendance: 4,000
Referee: Halim Aqa Shirzad (Afghanistan)

15 August 2019
17:00

Turkmenistan	0–2	Uzbekistan
	Report	Abdumajidov 45+1'; Ibragimov 83'

Republic Central Stadium, Dushanbe
Attendance: 500
Referee: Vahid Seyed Kazemi (Iran)
15 August 2019
20:00

Tajikistan	1–1	Iran
Soirov 39'	Report	Rahimabadi 80'

Republic Central Stadium, Dushanbe
Attendance: 10,000
Referee: Akhrol Riskullaev (Uzbekistan)

== Goalscorers ==
There were 34 goals scored in 10 matches, for an average of 3.4 goals per match.

4 goals

- (Tajikistan) Rustam Soirov

3 goals

- (Iran) Aria Barzegar
- (Tajikistan) Shahrom Samiev

2 goals

- (Afghanistan) Farshid Wojdi
- (Afghanistan) Tareq Mohammadi
- (Iran) Mahdi Hashemnezhad Rahimabadi
- (Iran) Mohammad Hossein Zavari
- (Tajikistan) Amadoni Kamolov
- (Uzbekistan) Odilbek Abdumajidov

1 goal

- (Afghanistan) Rashed Azizi
- (Iran) Hossein Bizhani
- (Iran) Seyed Reza Mousavian
- (Turkmenistan) Ruslan Priýew
- (Turkmenistan) Begençmyrat Myradow
- (Turkmenistan) Rahman Myratberdiýew
- (Tajikistan) Islom Zoirov
- (Tajikistan) Abdulmumin Zabirov
- (Uzbekistan) Ibrokhimkhalil Yuldoshev
- (Uzbekistan) Ibrokhim Ibragimov
- (Uzbekistan) Bekhzod Shamsiev
- (Uzbekistan) Tokhir Rafaelov

Source: CAFA

== Player awards ==
The following awards were given at the conclusion of the tournament:

The ranking for the Top Goalscorer was determined using the following criteria: goals, assists and fewest minutes played.

Top Goalscorer	Best player	Fair Play award	Special award
(Tajikistan) Shahrom Samiev	(Iran) Amirhossein Nikpour	Iran	Afghanistan
