= Central Asian Football Association =

Association football organization in Central Asia

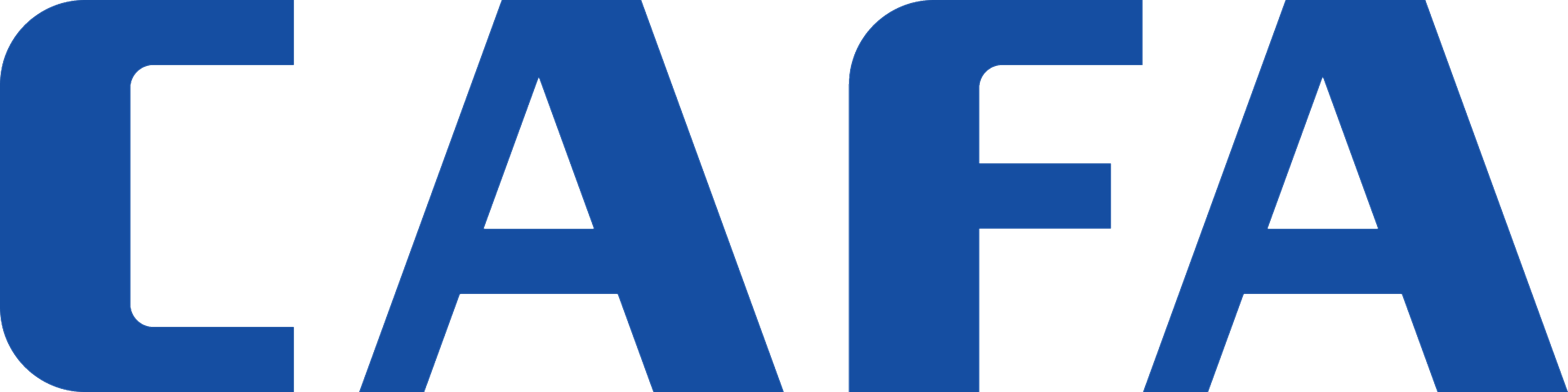

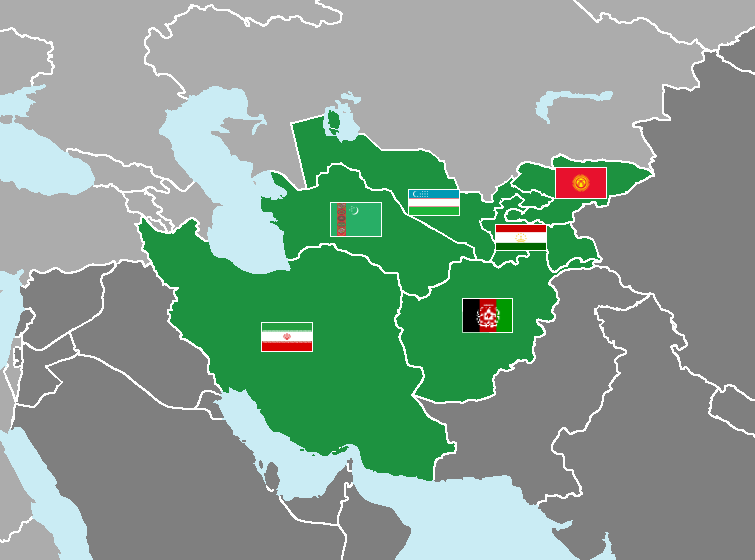
- Abbreviation: CAFA
- Formation: 9 January 2015; 11 years ago
- Type: Sports organization
- Headquarters: Dushanbe, Tajikistan
- Members: 6 member associations
- President: (Tajikistan) Rustam Emomali
- Vice president: (Afghanistan) Mohammad Yousef Kargar
- General secretary: (Tajikistan) Ulugbek Karimov
- Website: www.the-cafa.com

Central Asian Football Association (CAFA) is one of five regional bodies that govern association football in Asia. It governs association football, futsal, and beach football in Central Asia and countries neighboring the region. Headquartered in Dushanbe, Tajikistan, CAFA consists of six full national association members: Afghanistan, Iran, Kyrgyzstan, Tajikistan, Turkmenistan, and Uzbekistan.

CAFA consists of the national football associations of Central Asia, runs competitions between national and club teams, and controls the prize money, regulations, and media rights to those competitions. CAFA aims to develop and strengthen the game of football throughout the region by raising the standards and creating more opportunities for the Member Associations for further growth.

In June 2014, the association was in principle approved by the Asian Football Confederation and approved at the Extraordinary Congress in January 2015 during the 2015 AFC Asian Cup. As a result, CAFA will be able to have representative member(s) on the AFC executive committee.

The formation of CAFA was spearheaded by the Iranian Football Federation following disputes with West Asian Football Federation members. It was reported that AFC President Salman Bin Ibrahim Al-Khalifa gained politically from the creation of the new zone.

== History ==
Members of the six nations met with AFC president Sheikh Salman on 10 May 2014 to talk about the possibility of creating a new Asian football zone. The delegations were invited by the AFC president following an initiative and proposed by Afghanistan and Iran. At the extraordinary AFC congress on 9 June 2014 in São Paulo, the plan of the new zone was ratified by the congress. It was subsequently approved at the AFC Extraordinary Congress in January 2015. CAFA's main headquarters after its foundation is located in Dushanbe, Tajikistan.

In 2018, the inaugural edition of the CAFA Women's Championship was held in Uzbekistan. In June 2023, the inaugural edition of the CAFA Nations Cup was held in Uzbekistan and Kyrgyzstan. In October 2023, CAFA and AIFF signed a memorandum of understanding which will facilitate the participation of Indian teams in the Central Asian tournaments. In February 2025, Uzbekistan, Tajikistan, and Kyrgyzstan submitted a joint bid to host the 2031 AFC Asian Cup. In April 2025, it was announced that two European teams, Armenia and Russia, had been invited to the 2025 CAFA Men's Futsal Championship, hosted by Iran. In June 2025, the second edition of the CAFA Nations Cup was announced to be held in August and September 2025, co-hosted by Uzbekistan and Tajikistan.

== Executive committee ==
Position	Name	Years active
President	(Tajikistan) Rustam Emomali	2019–present
Vice-president	(Afghanistan) Mohammad Yousef Kargar	2023–present
Second Vice-president	(Turkmenistan) Arslan Aynazarov	2019–present
General Secretary	(Tajikistan) Ulugbek Karimov	2019–present

=== Presidents ===
President	Years
(Uzbekistan) Mirabror Usmanov	2015–2018
(Uzbekistan) Umid Ahmadjonov	2018–2019
(Tajikistan) Rustam Emomali	2019–present

=== Vice-presidents ===
Vice-president	Years
(Tajikistan) Rustam Emomali	2015–2018
(Tajikistan) Khurshed Mirzo	2018–2019
(Kyrgyzstan) Dastanbek Konokbaev	2019–2023
(Afghanistan) Mohammad Yousef Kargar	2023–present

=== General Secretaries ===
General Secretary	Years
(Uzbekistan) Avazbek Maksumov	2015–2017
(Uzbekistan) Sanjar Rizayev	2018–2019
(Tajikistan) Ulugbek Karimov	2019–present

=== AFC Vice-Presidents for Central Zone ===
General Secretary	Years
(Iran) Ali Kafashian	2015–2019
(Iran) Mehdi Taj	2019–present

=== AFC Executive Committee Members for Central Zone ===
AFC Exco	Years
(Afghanistan) Mehri Zohra	2015–2019
(Afghanistan) Ali Reza Aghazada	2019–2023
(Kyrgyzstan) Dastanbek Konokbaev	2023–present

=== Member ===
AFC Member	Years
(Iran) Hedayat Mombini	2023–present

== Member associations ==
CAFA consists of six member associations. All of them are members of the Asian Football Confederation.

Code	Association	National teams	Founded	FIFA affiliation	AFC affiliation	CAFA affiliation	IOC member	Former federation
AFG	Afghanistan Football Federation	Men's; U23; U20; U17; F; BS; Women's; U20; U17	1933	1948	1954	2015	Yes	SAFF (2005–2014)
IRN	Football Federation Islamic Republic of Iran	Men's; U23; U20; U17; F; BS; Women's; U20; U17	1920	1948	1954	2015	Yes	WAFF (2001–2014)
KGZ	Kyrgyz Football Union	Men's; U23; U20; U17; F; BS; Women's; U20; U17	1992	1994	1994	2015	Yes	
TJK	Tajikistan Football Federation	Men's; U23; U20; U17; F; BS; Women's; U20; U17	1936	1994	1994	2015	Yes	
TKM	Football Federation of Turkmenistan	Men's; U23; U20; U17; F; BS; Women's; U20; U17	1992	1994	1994	2015	Yes	
UZB	Uzbekistan Football Association	Men's; U23; U20; U17; F; BS; Women's; U20; U17	1946	1994	1994	2015	Yes	

Association	National Football Leagues	League Champion	National Football Cups	Cup Champion	Super Cups	Super Cup Champion
Afghanistan	Afghanistan Champions League	Abu Muslim	–	–	–	–
Afghanistan	–	–	–	–	–	–
Iran	Persian Gulf Pro League	Tractor	Hazfi Cup	Esteghlal	Iranian Super Cup	Tractor
Iran	Kowsar Women Football league	Khatoon F.C	Women's Hazfi Cup	–	Women's Super Cup	–
Kyrgyzstan	Kyrgyzstan Top League	Dordoi	Kyrgyzstan Cup	Neftchi Kochkor-Ata	Kyrgyzstan Super Cup	Dordoi
Kyrgyzstan	Kyrgyzstan Women's League	SDYUSHOR Sl Alge	–	–	–	–
Tajikistan	Tajikistan Higher League	Istiklol	Tajikistan Cup	Khujand	Tajikistan Super Cup	Istiklol
Tajikistan	–	–	–	–	–	–
Turkmenistan	Turkmenistan Higher League	Altyn Asyr	Turkmenistan Cup	Şagadam	Turkmenistan Super Cup	Altyn Asyr
Turkmenistan	–	–	–	–	–	–
Uzbekistan	Uzbekistan Super League	Pakhtakor	Uzbekistan Cup	Nasaf	Uzbekistan Super Cup	Pakhtakor
Uzbekistan	Uzbekistan Women's League	Sogdiana	Uzbek women's Cup	Bunyodkor Tashkent	Uzbek women's Super Cup	Bunyodkor Tashkent

== Competitions ==
https://the-cafa.com/competitions_page/

=== Current title holders ===
CAFA runs several competitions which cover men's, women's, youth and futsal.

Competition	Year	Champions	Title	Runners-up	Next edition
Men's National teams
CAFA Nations Cup	2025	Uzbekistan	1st	Iran	2027
CAFA U-20 Championship	2026	Uzbekistan	2nd	Kyrgyzstan	TBD
CAFA U-19 Championship	2022	Iran	2nd	Uzbekistan	TBD
CAFA U-17 Championship	2026	Tajikistan	3rd	Uzbekistan	TBD
CAFA U-16 Championship	2022	Iran	1st	Uzbekistan	TBD
CAFA U-15 Championship	2021	Iran	2nd	Tajikistan	TBD
CAFA U-14 Championship	2022	Tajikistan	1st	Iran	TBD
CAFA Futsal Cup	2023	Iran U23	1st	Afghanistan	TBD
CAFA U-19 Futsal Championship	2022	Iran	1st	Afghanistan	TBD
Women's National teams
CAFA Women's Championship	2022	Uzbekistan	2nd	Iran	TBD
CAFA U-23 Women's Championship	2019	Uzbekistan	1st	Iran	TBD
CAFA U-20 Women's Championship	2026	Uzbekistan	2nd	Iran	TBD
CAFA U-19 Women's Championship	2016	Uzbekistan	1st	Iran	TBD
CAFA U-18 Women's Championship	2025	Uzbekistan		Kyrgyzstan	
CAFA U-17 Women's Championship	2026	Kyrgyzstan	3rd	Iran	2027
CAFA U-15 Girls Championship	2024	Iran	2nd	Uzbekistan	TBD
CAFA U-14 Girls Championship	2023	Iran	1st	Kyrgyzstan	TBD
CAFA Women's Futsal Championship	2026	Iran	5th	Kyrgyzstan	TBD
CAFA U-19 Women's Futsal Championship	2020	Iran	1st	Uzbekistan	TBD
Men's Clubs teams
CAFA Silk Way Cup	2026				TBD

=== Events by Year ===
#	Year	Events
1	2016	2
2	2017	2
3	2018	3
4	2019	4
5	2020	1
6	2021	3

#	Year	Events
7	2022	8
8	2023	7
9	2024	5
10	2025	6
11	2026	5

=== Events timeline ===
Competitions:

#	Event	Host City	Host Country	Champions	Teams	Dates	Ref
2016
1	2016 CAFA U-19 Championship	Tashkent	Uzbekistan	Uzbekistan	6	7-16 August	
2	2016 CAFA U-19 Women's Championship	Tashkent	Uzbekistan	Uzbekistan	4	14-16 October	
2017
3	2017 CAFA U-15 Championship	Hisor	Tajikistan	Afghanistan	5	2-9 July	
4	2017 CAFA U-15 Girls Championship	Hisor	Tajikistan	Uzbekistan	4	26-28 August	
2018
5	2018 CAFA U-16 Championship	Tashkent	Uzbekistan	Uzbekistan	4	3-13 July	
6	2018 CAFA U-15 Championship	Tashkent	Uzbekistan	Iran	6	20-31 July	
7	2018 CAFA Women's Championship	Tashkent	Uzbekistan	Uzbekistan	5	23 Nov – 1 Dec	
2019
8	2019 CAFA U-16 Championship	Dushanbe - Hisor	Tajikistan	Tajikistan	6	26 July - 1 August	
9	2019 CAFA U-19 Championship	Dushanbe	Tajikistan	Iran	5	9-15 August	
10	2019 CAFA U-15 Girls Championship	Tashkent	Uzbekistan	Iran	4	13-16 September	
11	2019 CAFA U-23 Women's Championship	Dushanbe - Hisor	Tajikistan	Uzbekistan	6	22-28 November	
2020
12	2020 CAFA U-19 Women's Futsal Championship	Dushanbe	Tajikistan	Iran	6	24-29 January	
2021
13	2021 CAFA U-20 Women's Championship	Dushanbe	Tajikistan	Uzbekistan	5	11–17 June	
14	2021 CAFA U-17 Women's Championship	Dushanbe	Tajikistan	Uzbekistan	4	3-7 July	
15	2021 CAFA U-15 Championship	Dushanbe	Tajikistan	Iran	5	17–24 November	
2022
16	2022 CAFA Women's Futsal Championship	Dushanbe	Tajikistan	Iran	4	21-28 January	
17	2022 CAFA U-19 Futsal Championship	Bishkek	Kyrgyzstan	Iran	5	12-19 February	
18	2022 CAFA U-18 Women's Championship	Dushanbe	Tajikistan	Iran	4	11-15 March	
19	2022 CAFA U-16 Championship	Dushanbe	Tajikistan	Iran	5	13-20 May	
20	2022 CAFA Women's Championship	Dushanbe	Tajikistan	Uzbekistan	5	6-21 July	
21	2022 CAFA U-19 Championship	Dushanbe	Tajikistan	Iran	5	3-13 August	
22	2022 CAFA U-15 Girls Championship	Hisor	Tajikistan	Uzbekistan	3	21-26 October	
23	2022 CAFA U-14 Championship	Hisor	Tajikistan	Tajikistan	5	11–18 November	
2023
24	2023 CAFA Women's Futsal Championship	Tashkent	Uzbekistan	Iran	4	27–30 January	
25	2023 CAFA U-17 Women's Championship	Hisor	Tajikistan	Uzbekistan	4	10–17 March	
26	2023 CAFA U-20 Championship	Dushanbe - Tursunzoda	Tajikistan	Uzbekistan	5	21–28 May	
27	2023 CAFA Championship	Bishkek - Tashkent	Kyrgyzstan - Uzbekistan	Iran	7	10–20 June	
28	2023 CAFA Futsal Cup	Dushanbe	Tajikistan	Iran	6	23–30 July	
29	2023 CAFA U-17 Championship	Hisor	Tajikistan	Tajikistan	5	18–28 August	
30	2023 CAFA U-14 Girls Championship	Dushanbe	Tajikistan	Iran	4	15–19 October	
2024
31	2024 CAFA Women's Futsal Championship	Dushanbe	Tajikistan	Iran	5	2–12 February	
32	2024 CAFA U-18 Women's Championship	Dushanbe	Tajikistan	Iran	5	19–28 April	
33	2024 CAFA U-15 Girls Championship	Dushanbe	Tajikistan	Iran	4	21–25 May	
34	2024 CAFA U-20 Championship	Jalal-Abad	Kyrgyzstan	Iran	6	5–12 July	
35	2024 CAFA U-17 Championship	Dushanbe	Tajikistan	Afghanistan	6	17–24 August	
2025
36	2025 CAFA Women's Futsal Championship	Dushanbe	Tajikistan	Iran	5	9–16 February	
37	2025 CAFA U-17 Women's Championship	Dushanbe	Tajikistan	Uzbekistan	4	4–8 March	
38	2025 CAFA U-17 Championship	Tashkent	Uzbekistan	Tajikistan	6	24-31 May	
39	2025 CAFA U-20 Championship	Hisor - Tursunzoda	Tajikistan	Iran	6	13-23 June	
40	2025 CAFA Nations Cup	Hisor – Tashkent	Tajikistan - Uzbekistan	Uzbekistan	8	26 August-8 September	
41	2025 CAFA U-18 Women's Championship	[[]]	{{}}	{{}}	5	29 October-9 November	
2026
42	CAFA U17 Championship 2026	[[]]	{{}}	[[ national football team|]]	5		
43	CAFA U20 Championship 2026	[[]]	{{}}	[[ national football team|]]	5		
44	2026 CAFA Women's Futsal Championship	[[]]	{{}}	[[ national football team|]]	3		
45	CAFA U20 Women’s Championship 2026	[[]]	{{}}	[[ national football team|]]	4		
46	CAFA U17 Women’s Championship 2026	[[]]	{{}}	[[ national football team|]]	4		

- Men
- Women

=== Medals ===
As of 19 September 2026 (After CAFA U17 Women’s Championship 2026).

Rank	Nation	Gold	Silver	Bronze	Total
1	Iran	21	15	2	38
2	Uzbekistan	17	18	7	42
3	Tajikistan	5	2	16	23
4	Afghanistan	2	3	1	6
5	Kyrgyzstan	1	8	14	23
6	Turkmenistan	0	0	4	4
7	India	0	0	1	1
7	Oman	0	0	1	1
Totals (8 entries)		46	46	46	138

== Tournament record ==
=== FIFA World Cup ===
FIFA World Cup record
Team	1930 (Uruguay) (13)	1934 (Kingdom of Italy) (16)	1938 (French Third Republic) (15)	1950 (Fourth Brazilian Republic) (13)	1954 (Switzerland) (16)	1958 (Sweden) (16)	1962 (Chile) (16)	1966 (England) (16)	1970 (Mexico) (16)	1974 (West Germany) (16)	1978 (Argentina) (16)	1982 (Spain) (24)	1986 (Mexico) (24)	1990 (Italy) (24)	1994 (United States) (24)	1998 (France) (32)	2002 (Japan) (South Korea) (32)	2006 (Germany) (32)	2010 (South Africa) (32)	2014 (Brazil) (32)	2018 (Russia) (32)	2022 (Qatar) (32)	2026 (Canada) (Mexico) (United States) (48)	2030 (Morocco) (Portugal) (Spain) (48)	2034 (Saudi Arabia) (48)	Years
Iran	—N/a									•	GS	×	×	•	•	GS	•	GS	•	GS	GS	GS	GS			7
Uzbekistan	—N/a															•	•	•	•	•	•	•	GS			1

=== Olympic Games men's football tournament ===
Olympic Games (Men's tournament) record
Team	1900 (France) (3)	1904 (United States) (3)	1908 (United Kingdom) (6)	1912 (Sweden) (11)	1920 (Belgium) (14)	1924 (France) (22)	1928 (Netherlands) (17)	1936 (Germany) (16)	1948 (United Kingdom) (18)	1952 (Finland) (25)	1956 (Australia) (11)	1960 (Italy) (16)	1964 (Japan) (14)	1968 (Mexico) (16)	1972 (West Germany) (16)	1976 (Canada) (13)	1980 (Soviet Union) (16)	1984 (United States) (16)	1988 (South Korea) (16)	1992 (Spain) (16)	1996 (United States) (16)	2000 (Australia) (16)	2004 (Greece) (16)	2008 (China) (16)	2012 (United Kingdom) (16)	2016 (Brazil) (16)	2021 (Japan) (16)	2024 (France) (16)	Years
Afghanistan	—N/a								PR	—N/a		abandoned qualification second leg	—N/a											•	—N/a	•	•	•	1
Iran	—N/a								—N/a				GS	—N/a	GS	QF	qualified but withdrew	—N/a	•	•	•	•	•	•	•	•	•	•	4
Uzbekistan	—N/a																				•	•	•	•	•	•	•	GS	1

=== AFC Asian Cup ===
AFC Asian Cup record
Team	1956 (Hong Kong) (4)	1960 (South Korea) (4)	1964 (Israel) (4)	1968 (Iran) (5)	1972 (Thailand) (6)	1976 (Iran) (6)	1980 (Kuwait) (10)	1984 (Singapore) (10)	1988 (Qatar) (10)	1992 (Japan) (8)	1996 (United Arab Emirates) (12)	2000 (Lebanon) (12)	2004 (China) (16)	2007 (Indonesia) (Malaysia) (Thailand) (Vietnam) (16)	2011 (Qatar) (16)	2015 (Australia) (16)	2019 (United Arab Emirates) (24)	2023 (Qatar) (24)	2027 (Saudi Arabia) (24)	Years
Iran	×	•	×	1st	1st	1st	3rd	4th	3rd	GS	3rd	QF	3rd	QF	QF	QF	SF	SF	Q	16
Kyrgyzstan	Part of Soviet Union										•	•	•	×	•	•	R16	GS	Q	3
Tajikistan	Part of Soviet Union										•	•	•	×	•	•	•	QF		1
Turkmenistan	Part of Soviet Union										•	•	GS	×	•	•	GS	•		2
Uzbekistan	Part of Soviet Union										GS	GS	QF	QF	4th	QF	R16	QF	Q	9

=== Asian Games ===
Football at the Asian Games was a senior tournament until 1998.
Football at the Asian Games has been an under-23 tournament since 2002.

Nation	(India) 1951 (6)	(Philippines) 1954 (12)	(Japan) 1958 (14)	(Indonesia) 1962 (8)	(Thailand) 1966 (11)	(Thailand) 1970 (10)	(Iran) 1974 (15)	(Thailand) 1978 (14)	(India) 1982 (16)	(South Korea) 1986 (18)	(China) 1990 (14)	(Japan) 1994 (18)	(Thailand) 1998 (23)	(South Korea) 2002 (24)	(Qatar) 2006 (28)	(China) 2010 (24)	(South Korea) 2014 (29)	(Indonesia) 2018 (25)	(China) 2022 (21)	Years
Afghanistan	4th	GS												GS			GS			4
Iran	2nd		GS		2nd	QF	1st		QF	QF	1st	R16	1st	1st	3rd	4th	GS	R16	QF	16
Kyrgyzstan	Part of Soviet Union														GS	GS	R16	GS	R16	5
Tajikistan	Part of Soviet Union												GS		GS		R16			3
Turkmenistan	Part of Soviet Union											QF	QF	R16		R16				4
Uzbekistan	Part of Soviet Union											1st	QF	R16	QF	QF	R16	QF	3rd	8

=== AFC U-23 Asian Cup ===
Teams	2013	2016	2018	2020	2022	2024	2026	Total
Iran	GS	QF	•	GS	GS	•		5
Tajikistan	•	•	•	•	GS	GS		2
Turkmenistan	•	•	•	•	QF	•		1
Uzbekistan	GS	GS	1st	4th	2nd	2nd		7

=== FIFA U-20 World Cup ===
FIFA U-20 World Cup record
Team	1977 (Tunisia) (16)	1979 (Japan) (16)	1981 (Australia) (16)	1983 (Mexico) (16)	1985 (Soviet Union) (16)	1987 (Chile) (16)	1989 (Saudi Arabia) (16)	1991 (Portugal) (16)	1993 (Australia) (16)	1995 (Qatar) (16)	1997 (Malaysia) (24)	1999 (Nigeria) (24)	2001 (Argentina) (24)	2003 (United Arab Emirates) (24)	2005 (Netherlands) (24)	2007 (Canada) (24)	2009 (Egypt) (24)	2011 (Colombia) (24)	2013 (Turkey) (24)	2015 (New Zealand) (24)	2017 (South Korea) (24)	2019 (Poland) (24)	2023 (Argentina) (24)	Years
Iran	GS	•	×	×	×	×	•	×	•	×	•	•	GS	•	•	•	•	•	•	•	GS	•	•	3
Uzbekistan									•	•	•	•	•	GS	•	•	GS	•	QF	QF	•	•	R16	5

=== FIFA U-17 World Cup ===
FIFA U-17 World Cup record
Team	1985 (China) (16)	1987 (Canada) (16)	1989 (Scotland) (16)	1991 (Italy) (16)	1993 (Japan) (16)	1995 (Ecuador) (16)	1997 (Egypt) (16)	1999 (New Zealand) (16)	2001 (Trinidad and Tobago) (16)	2003 (Finland) (16)	2005 (Peru) (16)	2007 (South Korea) (24)	2009 (Nigeria) (24)	2011 (Mexico) (24)	2013 (United Arab Emirates) (24)	2015 (Chile) (24)	2017 (India) (24)	2019 (Brazil) (24)	2023 (Indonesia) (24)	2025 (Qatar) (48)	Years
Iran	•	•	•	•	•	•	•	•	GS	•	•	•	R16	•	R16	•	QF	•	R16	•	5
Tajikistan						•	•	•	•	•	•	R16	•	•	•	•	•	GS	•	GS	3
Uzbekistan						•	•	•	•	•	•	•	•	QF	R16	•	•	•	QF	R16	4

=== FIFA Futsal World Cup ===
FIFA Futsal World Cup record
Team	(Netherlands) 1989 (16)	(Hong Kong) 1992 (16)	(Spain) 1996 (16)	(Guatemala) 2000 (16)	(Chinese Taipei) 2004 (16)	(Brazil) 2008 (20)	(Thailand) 2012 (24)	(Colombia) 2016 (24)	(Lithuania) 2021 (24)	(Uzbekistan) 2024 (24)	Years
Afghanistan	•	•	•	•	•	•	•	•	•	R16	1
Iran	•	4th	GS	GS	GS	R16	R16	3rd	QF	R16	9
Tajikistan	•		•	•	•	•	•	•	•	GS	1
Uzbekistan	•			•	•	•	•	GS	R16	GS	3

=== AFC Futsal Asian Cup ===
Team	(Malaysia) 1999	(Thailand) 2000	(Iran) 2001	(Indonesia) 2002	(Iran) 2003	(Macau) 2004	(Vietnam) 2005	(Uzbekistan) 2006	(Japan) 2007	(Thailand) 2008	(Uzbekistan) 2010	(United Arab Emirates) 2012	(Vietnam) 2014	(Uzbekistan) 2016	(Taiwan) 2018	(Kuwait) 2022	(Thailand) 2024	Years
Afghanistan	×	×	×	×	×	×	×	×	×	×	•	×	×	•	•	•	QF	1
Iran	1st	1st	1st	1st	1st	1st	1st	3rd	1st	1st	1st	3rd	2nd	1st	1st	2nd	1st	17
Kyrgyzstan	R1	R1	R1	QF	QF	R1	4th	4th	4th	QF	QF	QF	R1	6th	R1	•	QF	16
Tajikistan	×	×	R1	×	×	×	R2	R1	QF	R1	R1	R1	R1	R1	R1	QF	4th	12
Turkmenistan	×	×	×	×	×	×	R1	R1	R1	R1	R1	R1	•	•	•	R1	×	7
Uzbekistan	R1	R1	2nd	QF	QF	4th	3rd	2nd	3rd	QF	2nd	QF	3rd	2nd	3rd	3rd	3rd	17

== Rankings ==
=== Men's National Teams ===
FIFA Rankings (as of 7 October 2026)
CAFA*	FIFA	+/−	National Team	Points
1	23	▼1	Iran	1597.31
2	59	▲1	Uzbekistan	1416.61
3	100	▲1	Tajikistan	1218.88
4	104	▲2	Kyrgyzstan	1199.73
5	139	▲2	Turkmenistan	1078.65
6	168	▲3	Afghanistan	968.07

Leading Men's team:

=== Women's National Teams ===
FIFA Rankings (as of 16 June 2026)
CAFA*	FIFA	+/−	National Team	Points
1	51	▲2	Uzbekistan	1474.15
2	68	Steady	Iran	1370.37
3	137	▲6	Kyrgyzstan	1070.63
4	141	▼1	Turkmenistan	1063.88
5	159	▼1	Tajikistan	954.78

- ^{*} Provisionally listed due to not having played more than five matches against officially ranked teams
- ^{**} Inactive for more than 18 months and therefore not ranked
- Last updated 9 June 2023.

Leading Women's team:

=== Futsal ===
FIFA Rankings (as of 24 September 2026)
CAFA*	FIFA	+/−	National Team	Points
1	5	Steady	Iran	1507.71
2	22	▼1	Afghanistan	1192.37
3	24	▼1	Uzbekistan	1186.5
4	48	▲1	Kyrgyzstan	1056.57
5	49	▲1	Tajikistan	1056.09
6	68	▲1	Turkmenistan	992.35

FIFA Rankings (as of 24 September 2026)
CAFA*	FIFA	+/−	National Team	Points
1	10	Steady	Iran	1161.08
2	24	▲1	Uzbekistan	997.99
3	47	Steady	Afghanistan	907.13
4	51	Steady	Turkmenistan	891.8
5	63	Steady	Kyrgyzstan	841.1
6	69	Steady	Tajikistan	809.01

=== Men's national beach soccer team ===
BSWW Rankings (as of 2 September 2026)
CAFA*	BSWW	+/−	National Team	Points
1	6	Steady	Iran	1786.75
2	70	▲1	Afghanistan	82
3	84	Steady	Kyrgyzstan	19.25
4	88	▼1	Uzbekistan	16.75

== Individual statistics ==
=== Top goalscorer in men's football ===
As of 15 October 2024

==== By number of goals ====
#	Name	Career	Goals	Caps	Avg/Game
1	(Iran) Ali Daei (list)	1993–2006	108	148	0.73
2	(Iran) **Sardar Azmoun**	2014– present	55	87	0.63
3	(Iran) **Mehdi Taremi**	2015– present	51	89	0.57
4	(Iran) Karim Bagheri	1993–2010	50	87	0.57
5	(Uzbekistan) **Eldor Shomurodov**	2015– present	41	77	0.55
6	(Iran) Ali Karimi	1998–2012	38	127	0.3
6	(Iran) Javad Nekounam	2000–2015	38	149	0.26
8	(Uzbekistan) Maxim Shatskikh	1999–2014	34	61	0.56
9	(Uzbekistan) Mirjalol Kosimov	1992–2005	31	67	0.46
9	(Uzbekistan) Alexander Geynrikh	2002–2017	31	97	0.32

==== By country ====
(only highest goalscorers from each country)

#	Name	Career	Goals	Caps	Avg/Game
1	(Iran) Ali Daei (list)	1993–2006	108	148	0.73
2	(Uzbekistan) **Eldor Shomurodov**	2015– present	41	77	0.53
3	(Tajikistan) **Manuchekhr Dzhalilov**	2011– present	20	51	0.39
4	(Turkmenistan) Wladimir Baýramow	2000–2013	16	39	0.41
4	(Kyrgyzstan) Mirlan Murzayev	2009–2023	16	60	0.27
6	(Afghanistan) **Faysal Shayesteh**	2014– present	9	58	0.16
6	(Afghanistan) **Balal Arezou**	2011– Present	9	28	0.32

Players in bold are active international players.

== See also ==
- FIFA
  - Asian Football Confederation (AFC)
    - ASEAN Football Federation (AFF)
    - East Asian Football Federation (EAFF)
    - Central Asian Football Association (CAFA)
    - South Asian Football Federation (SAFF)
    - West Asian Football Federation (WAFF)

== Results links ==
- https://www.international-football.net/countries
- https://www.international-football.net/countries#AFC
- https://www.international-football.net/country?team=Iran
- https://www.international-football.net/country?team=Afghanistan
- https://www.international-football.net/country?team=Tajikistan
- https://www.international-football.net/country?team=Uzbekistan
- https://www.international-football.net/country?team=Turkmenistan
- https://www.international-football.net/country?team=Kyrgyzstan
