= CAFA Junior Championship =

The CAFA Junior Championship, is an international association football competition contested by the junior (U-18 to U-20) national teams of the members of the Central Asian Football Association (CAFA), the governing body of football in Central Asia.

== Results ==
=== Under-20 Men ===
CAFA U-20 Championship
- Founded: 2023; 3 years ago
- Region: Central Asia (CAFA)
- Teams: 5 (as of 2023)
- Current champions: Iran (1st title)
- Most championships: Iran(2 title each)
- 2025 CAFA U-20 Championship

The CAFA U-20 Championship is an international football competition contested by the Central Asian men's under-20 national teams of the CAFA member associations. The competition began in 2023, with Uzbekistan winning the inaugural competition.

Edition	Year	Hosts	Champions	Score	Runners-up	Third place	Score and Venue	Fourth place	No. of Teams
1	2023	Tajikistan	Uzbekistan	round-robin	Iran	Tajikistan	round-robin	Afghanistan	5
2	2024	Kyrgyzstan	Iran	3–0	Kyrgyzstan	Uzbekistan	3–0	Tajikistan	6
3	2025	Tajikistan	Iran	2–0	Kyrgyzstan	Tajikistan	1-1 (4-2 P)	Uzbekistan	6
4	2026	Tajikistan	Uzbekistan	round-robin	Kyrgyzstan	Tajikistan	round-robin	Turkmenistan	6

Teams reaching the top four
Team	Titles	Runners-up	Third place	Fourth place	Total
Iran	1 (2024)	1 (2023)			2
Uzbekistan	1 (2023)		1 (2024)		2
Kyrgyzstan		1 (2024)			1
Tajikistan			1 (2023^{*})	1 (2024)	2
Afghanistan				1 (2023)	1

* = hosts

=== Under-19 Men ===
CAFA U-19 Championship
- Founded: 2016; 10 years ago
- Region: Central Asia (CAFA)
- Teams: 5 (as of 2022)
- Current champions: Iran (2nd title)
- Most championships: Iran (2 titles)
- 2022 CAFA U-19 Championship

The CAFA U-19 Championship is an international football competition contested by the Central Asian men's under-19 national teams of the CAFA member associations. The competition began in 2016, with Uzbekistan winning the inaugural competition.

Edition	Year	Hosts	Champions	Score	Runners-up	Third place	Score and Venue	Fourth place	No. of Teams
1	2016	Uzbekistan	Uzbekistan	1–0	Kyrgyzstan	Turkmenistan	2–1	Afghanistan	6
2	2019	Tajikistan	Iran	round-robin	Tajikistan	Uzbekistan	round-robin	Afghanistan	5
3	2022	Tajikistan	Iran	round-robin	Uzbekistan	Tajikistan	round-robin	Kyrgyzstan	5

Teams reaching the top four
Team	Titles	Runners-up	Third place	Fourth place	Total
Iran	2 (2019, 2022)				2
Uzbekistan	1 (2016^{*})	1 (2022)	1 (2019)		3
Tajikistan		1 (2019^{*})	1 (2022^{*})		2
Kyrgyzstan		1 (2016)		1 (2022)	2
Turkmenistan			1 (2016)		1
Afghanistan				2 (2016, 2019)	2

* = hosts

=== Under-20 Women ===
CAFA U-20 Women's Championship
- Founded: 2021; 5 years ago
- Region: Central Asia (CAFA)
- Teams: 5 (as of 2021)
- Current champions: Uzbekistan (1st title)
- Most championships: Uzbekistan (1 title)
- 2021 CAFA U-20 Women's Championship

The CAFA U-20 Women's Championship is an international football competition contested by the Central Asian women's under-20 national teams of the CAFA member associations. The competition began in 2021, with Uzbekistan winning the inaugural competition.

Edition	Year	Hosts	Champions	Score	Runners-up	Third place	Score and Venue	Fourth place	No. of Teams
1	2021	Tajikistan	Uzbekistan	round-robin	Iran	Kyrgyzstan	round-robin	Afghanistan	5
2	2026	Tajikistan	Uzbekistan	round-robin	Iran	Kyrgyzstan	round-robin	Tajikistan	4

Teams reaching the top four
Team	Titles	Runners-up	Third place	Fourth place	Total
Uzbekistan	1 (2021)				1
Iran		1 (2021)			1
Kyrgyzstan			1 (2021)		1
Afghanistan				1 (2021)	1

* = hosts

=== Under-19 Women ===
CAFA U-19 Women's Championship
- Founded: 2016; 10 years ago
- Region: Central Asia (CAFA)
- Teams: 4 (as of 2016)
- Current champions: Uzbekistan (1st title)
- Most championships: Uzbekistan (1 title)
- 2016 CAFA U-19 Women's Championship

The CAFA U-19 Women's Championship is an international football competition contested by the Central Asian women's under-19 national teams of the CAFA member associations. The competition began in 2016, with Uzbekistan winning the inaugural competition.

Edition	Year	Hosts	Champions	Score	Runners-up	Third place	Score and Venue	Fourth place	No. of Teams
1	2016	Uzbekistan	Uzbekistan	round-robin	Iran	Kyrgyzstan	round-robin	Tajikistan	4

Teams reaching the top four
Team	Titles	Runners-up	Third place	Fourth place	Total
Uzbekistan	1 (2016^{*})				1
Iran		1 (2016)			1
Kyrgyzstan			1 (2016)		1
Tajikistan				1 (2016)	1

* = hosts

=== Under-18 Women ===
CAFA U-18 Women's Championship
- Founded: 2022; 4 years ago
- Region: Central Asia (CAFA)
- Teams: 5 (as of 2024)
- Current champions: Iran (2nd title)
- Most championships: Iran (2 title)
- 2024 CAFA U-18 Women's Championship

The CAFA U-18 Women's Championship is an international football competition contested by the Central Asian women's under-18 national teams of the CAFA member associations. The competition began in 2022, with Iran winning the inaugural competition.

Edition	Year	Hosts	Champions	Score	Runners-up	Third place	Score	Fourth place	No. of Teams
1	2022	Tajikistan	Iran	round-robin	Uzbekistan	Kyrgyzstan	round-robin	Tajikistan	4
2	2024	Tajikistan	Iran	round-robin	Uzbekistan	Kyrgyzstan	round-robin	Tajikistan	5
3	2025	Uzbekistan	Uzbekistan	round-robin	Kyrgyzstan	Iran	round-robin	Tajikistan	5

Teams reaching the top four
Team	Titles	Runners-up	Third place	Fourth place	Total
Iran	1 (2022)				1
Uzbekistan		1 (2022)			1
Kyrgyzstan			1 (2022)		1
Tajikistan				1 (2022^{*})	1

* = hosts
