= 2023 CAFA U-20 Championship =

Tournament details
- Host country: Tajikistan
- City: Dushanbe Tursunzoda
- Dates: 21–28 May
- Teams: 5 (from 1 sub-confederation)
- Venue(s): (CSKA Polytechnic Stadium, TALCO Arena), (in 2 host cities)

Final positions
- Champions: Uzbekistan (1st), (1title)
- Runners-up: Iran (2nd)
- Third place: Tajikistan (3rd)
- Fourth place: Afghanistan (4th)

Tournament statistics
- Matches played: 10
- Goals scored: 44 (4.4 per match)
- Attendance: 13,309 (1,331 per match)
- Top scorer: (Iran) Reza Mirzayan (6 goals)
- Best player: (Uzbekistan) Muhammadali Urinboev (2 goals)
- Fair play award: Afghanistan

The 2023 CAFA U-20 Championship is the first edition of the CAFA U-20 Championship, an international youth football championship organised by CAFA for the men's under-20 national teams of Central Asia. Tajikistan hosted the tournament between 21 and 28 May 2023. A total of five teams are playing in the tournament, with players born on or after 1 January 2003 eligible to participate.

== Participating nations ==
A total of 5 (out of 6) CAFA member national teams entered the tournament.

| Team | Appearance |
|---|---|
| Afghanistan | 1st |
| Iran | 1st |
| Tajikistan | 1st |
| Turkmenistan | 1st |
| Uzbekistan | 1st |

Did not enter

- Kyrgyzstan

== Venues ==
Matches were held at the CSKA Polytechnic Stadium and TALCO Arena.

| Dushanbe | 2023 CAFA U-20 Championship (Tajikistan) |
| CSKA Polytechnic Stadium | 2023 CAFA U-20 Championship (Tajikistan) |
| Capacity: ? | 2023 CAFA U-20 Championship (Tajikistan) |
| Tursunzoda | 2023 CAFA U-20 Championship (Tajikistan) |
| TALCO Arena | 2023 CAFA U-20 Championship (Tajikistan) |
| Capacity: 13,770 | 2023 CAFA U-20 Championship (Tajikistan) |

== Match officials ==
Referees

- (Afghanistan) Ashraf Hussainzada
- (Iran) Arab Baraghi Amir
- (Tajikistan) Abdullo Davlatov
- (Uzbekistan) Arslan Goshanov
- (Uzbekistan) Firdavs Norsafarov

Assistant referees

- (Afghanistan) Nangyali Sadat

== Main tournament ==
The main tournament schedule was announced on 16 May 2023.

| Pos | Team | Pld | W | D | L | GF | GA | GD | Pts | Final result |
|---|---|---|---|---|---|---|---|---|---|---|
| 1 | Uzbekistan | 4 | 3 | 1 | 0 | 17 | 5 | +12 | 10 | Champions |
| 2 | Iran | 4 | 3 | 0 | 1 | 11 | 5 | +6 | 9 | Runners-up |
| 3 | Tajikistan (H) | 4 | 1 | 2 | 1 | 7 | 6 | +1 | 5 | Third place |
| 4 | Afghanistan | 4 | 1 | 1 | 2 | 4 | 10 | −6 | 4 | |
| 5 | Turkmenistan | 4 | 0 | 0 | 4 | 5 | 18 | −13 | 0 | |

Updated to match(es) played on unknown. Source: CAFA
Rules for classification: Tiebreakers
(H) Hosts
21 May 2023
17:00

| Uzbekistan | 3–2 | Iran |
|---|---|---|
| Komilov 25'; Urinboev 41'; Akhmadjonov 69' | Report | Mirzayan 23', 36' |

TALCO Arena, Tursunzoda
Attendance: 1217
Referee: Abdullo Davlatov (Tajikistan)
21 May 2023
17:00

| Turkmenistan | 1–2 | Afghanistan |
|---|---|---|
| Esenov 48'; Annaev (penalty missed) 52' | Report | Alizada 46'; Kohi 84' |

CSKA Polytechnic Stadium, Dushanbe
Attendance: 173
Referee: Firdavs Norsafarov (Uzbekistan)

22 May 2023
17:00

| Afghanistan | 1–1 | Tajikistan |
|---|---|---|
| Amin 48' | Report | Gafurov 28' |

TALCO Arena, Tursunzoda
Attendance: 2150
Referee: Arslan Goshanov (Uzbekistan)
22 May 2023
17:00

| Turkmenistan | 2–9 | Uzbekistan |
|---|---|---|
| Esenov (penalty missed) 62'; Esenov 62', 87' | Report | Ibraimov 4'; Bekmurotov 16'; Haydarov 28' (pen.), 41', 45', 59', 84'; Komilov 33', 52' |

CSKA Polytechnic Stadium, Dushanbe
Attendance: 67
Referee: Arab Baraghi Amir (Iran)

24 May 2023
17:00

| Tajikistan | 4–2 | Turkmenistan |
|---|---|---|
| Oriyonmekhri 12'; Naimov (penalty missed) 15'; Muhammadjoni 30', 35'; Gafurov 82' | Report | Kadyrov 18'; Nigmatullozoda 25' (o.g.) |

TALCO Arena, Tursunzoda
Attendance: 2650
Referee: Ashraf Hussainzada (Afghanistan)
24 May 2023
17:00

| Iran | 4–1 | Afghanistan |
|---|---|---|
| Sadeghi 38'; Mirzayan 43'; Mazraï 63'; Atashgah 79' | Report | Alizada 67' |

CSKA Polytechnic Stadium, Dushanbe
Attendance: 82
Referee: Abdullo Davlatov (Tajikistan)

26 May 2023
17:00

| Uzbekistan | 1–1 | Tajikistan |
|---|---|---|
| Urinboev (penalty missed) 43'; Urinboev 90+4' (pen.) | Report | Khudjaev 90'; Ismoilov (red card) 90+5' |

TALCO Arena, Tursunzoda
Attendance: 3100
Referee: Arab Baraghi Amir (Iran)
26 May 2023
17:00

| Iran | 3–0 | Turkmenistan |
|---|---|---|
| Mirzayan 69', 75'; Atashgah 82' | Report | Esenov (red card) 62' |

CSKA Polytechnic Stadium, Dushanbe
Attendance: 220
Referee: Firdavs Norsafarov (Uzbekistan)

28 May 2023
10:30

| Afghanistan | 0–4 | Uzbekistan |
|---|---|---|
| | Report | Odilov 18', 40'; Tukhsanov 40'; Ibraimov 87' |

CSKA Polytechnic Stadium, Dushanbe
Attendance: 150
Referee: Abdullo Davlatov (Tajikistan)
28 May 2023
17:00

| Tajikistan | 1–2 | Iran |
|---|---|---|
| Khudjaev 74' | Report | Mirzayan 16'; Kharizi 28' |

TALCO Arena, Tursunzoda
Attendance: 3500
Referee: Firdavs Norsafarov (Uzbekistan)

== Player awards ==
The following awards were given at the conclusion of the tournament:

The ranking for the Top Goalscorer was determined using the following criteria: goals, assists and fewest minutes played.

| Top Goalscorer | Best player | Fair Play award | Special award |
|---|---|---|---|
| (Iran) Reza Mirzayan (6 goals) | (Uzbekistan) Muhammadali Urinboev | Afghanistan | Turkmenistan |

== Goalscorers ==
There were 44 goals scored in 10 matches, for an average of 4.4 goals per match.

6 goals

- (Iran) Reza Mirzayan

5 goals

- (Uzbekistan) Abdugafur Haydarov

3 goals

- (Turkmenistan) Gurbenmuhammad Esenov
- (Uzbekistan) Murodjon Komilov

2 goals

- (Afghanistan) Farhad Alizada
- (Iran) Mirmahdi Mahdavi Atashgah
- (Tajikistan) Masrur Gafurov
- (Tajikistan) Torhi Muhammadjoni
- (Tajikistan) Bekhruz Khudjaev
- (Uzbekistan) Muhammadali Urinboev
- (Uzbekistan) Temur Odilov
- (Uzbekistan) Nurlan Ibraimov

1 goal

- (Afghanistan) Enayatullah Kohi
- (Afghanistan) Homayoun Amin
- (Iran) Afshin Sadeghi
- (Iran) Youssef Mazraï
- (Iran) Abbas Kahrizi
- (Turkmenistan) Abdalla Kadyrov
- (Tajikistan) Nuriddin Oriyonmekhri
- (Uzbekistan) Narminjon Akhmadjonov
- (Uzbekistan) Alijon Bekmurotov
- (Uzbekistan) Daler Tukhsanov

1 own goal

- (Tajikistan) Barakatullo Nigmatullozoda (against Turkmenistan)

Source: CAFA
