= Aizhan Boronbekova =

Kyrgyz footballer (born 2000)

Personal information
- Date of birth: 31 March 2000 (age 26)
- Place of birth: Bishkek, Kyrgyzstan
- Height: 1.52 m (5 ft 0 in)
- Position: Midfielder

Team information
- Current team: MFA Žalgiris-MRU
- Number: 77

Senior career*
Years	Team	Apps	(Gls)
2019	Azaliya-SDYUSHOR SI		
2021–2023	FC Bunyodkor	15	(4)
2024–	MFA Žalgiris-MRU	23	(5)

International career^{‡}
2016–2019	Kyrgyzstan U19	9	(1)
2019	Kyrgyzstan U23	5	(1)
2018–	Kyrgyzstan	14	(2)
2020	Kyrgyzstan Futsal U19	5	(1)
2022–	Kyrgyzstan Futsal	12	(3)
- * Club domestic league appearances and goals ‡ National team caps and goals as of 21 January 2025

Aizhan Boronbekova (Kyrgyz: Айжан Боронбекова, Ayjan Boronbekova; born 31 March 2000) is a Kyrgyz professional footballer and futsal player who plays as a midfielder for Moterų A lyga club MFA Žalgiris-MRU and captains the Kyrgyzstan national team.

== Club career ==
in August 2021, Boronbekova joined Uzbekistan Women's League side FC Bunyodkor. In November of the same year, she participated with the club in the 2021 AFC Women's Club Championship held in Amman. Alongside the club, she finished as the league's runner-up in the 2021 season.

In April 2024, Boronbekova signed with Lithuanian club MFA Žalgiris-MRU in the Moterų A lyga. On 16 April 2024, she made her club debut against FK Saned, scoring her first goal in the same match.

On 10 December 2024, she won the Best Women's Player award at the annual KFU Football Awards.

== International career ==
=== Football ===
In 2016, at the age of 16, Boronbekova first represented Kyrgyzstan at the Under-19 level in the 2016 CAFA U-19 Women's Championship. She played her first match on 15 October 2016 against Iran and scored Kyrgyzstan's only goal in that game. Two years later, she was called by coach Gulbara Umatalieva to the senior squad for the 2018 CAFA Women's Championship held in Tashkent. On 8 September 2019, she scored her first international goal against Nepal during the 2019 Cup of Hope held in Karakol.

=== Futsal ===
After representing the nation at the Under-19 level in the 2020 CAFA U-19 Women's Futsal Championship, Boronbekova was called up to the senior futsal team for their inaugural campaign in the 2022 CAFA Women's Futsal Championship.

=== International goals ===
Scores and results list Kyrgyzstan's goal tally first, score column indicates score after each Boronbekova goal.

List of international goals scored by Aizhan Boronbekova
No.	Date	Venue	Opponent	Score	Result	Competition	Ref.
1	8 September 2019	Stadion Karakol, Karakol, Kyrgyzstan	Nepal	1–2	2–8	2019 Cup of Hope	
2	12 September 2019	Stadion Karakol, Karakol, Kyrgyzstan	Tajikistan	1–0	2–0	Friendly	
3	4 June 2026	BFA Outdoor Pitches, Manama, Bahrain	Bahrain	2–0	5–0	Friendly	
4	4 June 2026	BFA Outdoor Pitches, Manama, Bahrain	Bahrain	4–0	5–0	Friendly	
