= 2016 CAFA U-19 Championship =

Tournament details
- Host country: Uzbekistan
- City: Tashkent
- Dates: 5–11 August
- Teams: 6 (from 1 sub-confederation)
- Venue(s): 2 (in 1 host city)

Final positions
- Champions: Uzbekistan A (1st title)
- Runners-up: Kyrgyzstan
- Third place: Turkmenistan
- Fourth place: Afghanistan

Tournament statistics
- Matches played: 9
- Goals scored: 25 (2.78 per match)

The 2016 CAFA U-19 Championship was the inaugural edition of the CAFA U-19 Championship, the triennial international youth football championship organised by Central Asian Football Association for the men's under-19 national teams of Central Asia. Uzbekistan hosted the tournament from 6 to 9 August 2016. A total of six teams played in the tournament, with players born on or after 1 January 1997 eligible to participate.

Uzbekistan emerged as the inaugural champions of the first-ever CAFA tournament by defeating the Kyrgyz Republic 1–0 in the final match.

== Participating teams ==
Initially, all six CAFA members were set to participate in the tournament. However, Iran pulled out of the tournament before it began, and were replaced by a Uzbekistan B side.

Team	App.	Previous best performance
Afghanistan	1st	Debut
Kyrgyzstan	1st	debut
Tajikistan	1st	Debut
Turkmenistan	1st	Debut
Uzbekistan A	1st	Debut
Uzbekistan B	1st	Debut

Did not enter

- Iran (W)

== Venues ==
Tashkent		2016 CAFA U-19 Championship (Uzbekistan)
JAR Stadium	Pakhtakor Stadium	2016 CAFA U-19 Championship (Uzbekistan)
Capacity: 8,500	Capacity: 35,000	2016 CAFA U-19 Championship (Uzbekistan)

== Group stage ==
The final tournament schedule was announced on 25 July 2016.

=== Group A ===
Pos	Team	Pld	W	D	L	GF	GA	GD	Pts	Qualification
1	Kyrgyzstan	2	1	1	0	4	2	+2	4	Final
2	Uzbekistan B (H)	2	1	1	0	4	2	+2	4	Fifth place play-off
3	Afghanistan	2	0	0	2	0	4	−4	0	Third place play-off

Source: CAFA
Rules for classification: Group stage tiebreakers
(H) Hosts
6 August 2016
10:30

Uzbekistan B	2–2	Kyrgyzstan
Kodirkulov 45'; Sindarov 60' (pen.)	Report	Kelm 30', 44'

JAR Stadium, Tashkent

7 August 2016
10:30

Afghanistan	0–2	Uzbekistan B
	Report	Kodirkulov 5'; Ortikov 71' (pen.)

JAR Stadium, Tashkent

8 August 2016
10:30

Kyrgyzstan	2–0	Afghanistan
Mamyraliev; Smatov

JAR Stadium, Tashkent

=== Group B ===
Initially, Iran were drawn to this group, but after their withdrawal, Uzbekistan A replaced them.

Pos	Team	Pld	W	D	L	GF	GA	GD	Pts	Qualification
1	Uzbekistan A (H)	2	2	0	0	7	1	+6	6	Final
2	Turkmenistan	2	1	0	1	2	4	−2	3	Third place play-off
3	Tajikistan	2	0	0	2	2	6	−4	0	Fifth place play-off

Source: CAFA
Rules for classification: Group stage tiebreakers
(H) Hosts
6 August 2016
17:30

Uzbekistan A	3–0	Turkmenistan
Mukhiddinov 62', 63'; Tukhtasinov 84'

Pakhtakor Stadium, Tashkent

7 August 2016
17:30

Tajikistan	1–4	Uzbekistan A
Uzokov 90'	Report	Tukhtasinov 7'; Davlatzhonov 12'; Ganiev 20', 77'

Pakhtakor Stadium, Tashkent

8 August 2016
17:30

Turkmenistan	2–1	Tajikistan
	Report	Khamrokulov

Pakhtakor Stadium, Tashkent

== Placement matches ==
=== Fifth place play-off ===
9 August 2016
12:00

Uzbekistan B	1–1	Tajikistan
Esonkulov 66'	Report	Khamrokulov 44'
Penalties
	6–7

JAR Stadium, Tashkent

=== Third place play-off ===
9 August 2016
10:00

Afghanistan	1–2	Turkmenistan

JAR Stadium, Tashkent

=== Final ===
9 August 2016
17:30

Kyrgyzstan	0–1	Uzbekistan A
	Report	Kobilov 29'

JAR Stadium, Tashkent

== Goalscorers ==
There were 25 goals scored in 9 matches, for an average of 2.78 goals per match.

2 goals

- (Kyrgyzstan) Viktor Kelm
- (Tajikistan) Nuriddin Khamrokulov
- (Uzbekistan) Sharof Mukhiddinov
- (Uzbekistan) Nurillo Tukhtasinov
- (Uzbekistan) Azizjon Ganiev
- (Uzbekistan) Sanjar Kodirkulov

1 goal

- (Afghanistan) ??
- (Kyrgyzstan) Suyuntbek Mamyraliev
- (Kyrgyzstan) Azat Smatov
- (Tajikistan) Khudoydod Uzokov
- (Turkmenistan) ??
- (Turkmenistan) ??
- (Turkmenistan) ??
- (Turkmenistan) ??
- (Uzbekistan) Saidzhamol Davlatzhonov
- (Uzbekistan) Islom Kobilov
- (Uzbekistan) Javokhir Esonkulov
- (Uzbekistan) Sobit Sindarov
- (Uzbekistan) Abdukadyr Ortikov

Source: CAFA
