= Sayed Ali Reza Aghazada Sadat =

Sayed Alireza Aghazada
- سید علی رضا آقازاده
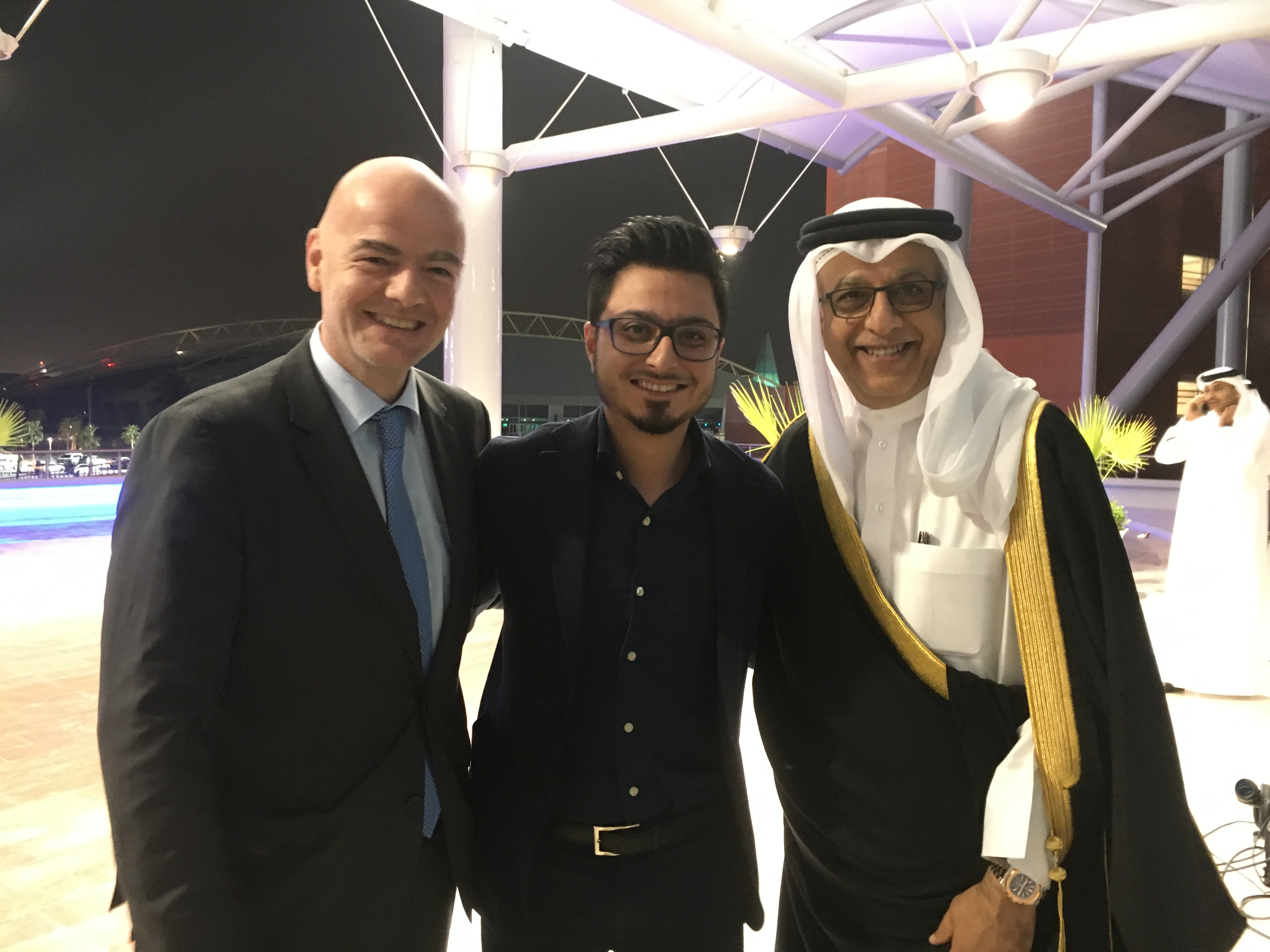
- Born: 20 January 1991 (age 35); Logar, Afghanistan
- Education: Kabul University

Sayed Alireza Aghazada (born 20 January 1991) is the former general secretary of the Afghanistan Football Federation.

Aghazada was elected as Asian Football Confederation executive member on 29th AFC Congress on 6 April 2019 in Kuala Lumpur.

Aghazada has served in national and international football positions, and the youngest executive member of AFC since its establishment in 1954.

During his office term as general secretary, the first Afghan Premier League was established, as well as several abroad training camps for the Afghan national football team. He served the following positions: Asian Football Confederation media and communication committee member

FIFA Organising committee member

Central Asian Football Association Head of marketing and communications

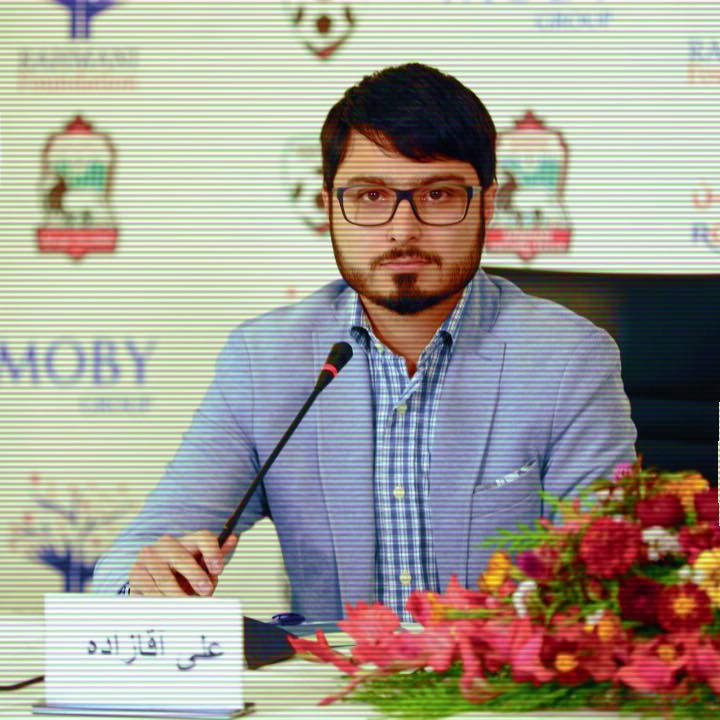
