= Iran women's national under-20 football team =

Women's under-20 national football team of Iran

Iran
- Nickname(s): Team Melli Javanane Zanan ("The Ladies Youth National Team")
- Association: IFF
- Confederation: AFC (Asia)
- Sub-confederation: CAFA (Central Asia)
- Head coach: Marta Mika
- FIFA code: IRN
First colours	Second colours

AFC U-20 Women's Asian Cup
- Appearances: 1 (first in 2015)
- Best result: Group stage (2015)

The Iran women's national under-20 football team represents Iran in international women's under-20 football in the AFC U-20 Women's Asian Cup and the FIFA U-20 Women's World Cup. It is controlled by the Iranian Football Federation.

== History ==
The women's under-20s qualified for the 2015 AFC U-19 Women's Championship for the first time after winning their group in qualification.

=== Nicknames ===
The Iran women's national under-20 football team has been known or nicknamed as the "Team Melli Javanane Zanan (The Ladies Youth National Team)".

== Results and fixtures ==
Win Draw Loss

== Competitive record ==
=== AFC U19/U20 Women's Championship ===
AFC U-20 Women's Asian Cup									Qualifications							
Year	Result	M	W	D	L	GF	GA	GD	M	W	D	L	GF	GA	GD	Link
(India) 2002	did not enter								no qualification							Link
(China) 2004	did not enter								no qualification							Link
(Malaysia) 2006	did not enter								did not enter							Link
(China) 2007	did not enter								did not enter							Link
(China) 2009	did not qualify								4	1	0	3	5	16	-11	Link
(Vietnam) 2011	did not qualify								7	3	0	4	16	24	-8	Link
(China) 2013	did not qualify								6	3	2	1	28	9	+19	Link
(China) 2015	Group stage	3	0	0	3	1	29	-28	2	2	0	0	10	1	+9	Link
(China) 2017	did not qualify								2	0	1	1	1	3	-2	Link
(Thailand) 2019	did not qualify								5	2	1	2	10	6	+4	Link
(Uzbekistan) 2024	did not qualify								5	3	0	2	12	8	+4	Link
(Thailand) 2026	did not qualify								3	2	0	1	5	11	-6	Link
Total	1/11	3	0	0	3	1	29	-28	33	15	4	14	87	78	+9	Link

- 2022 AFC U-20 Women's Asian Cup was cancelled.

=== CAFA Junior Championship ===
- 2016 CAFA U-19 Women's Championship
- 2021 CAFA U-20 Women's Championship
- 2022 CAFA U-18 Women's Championship
- 2024 CAFA U-18 Women's Championship

== See also ==
- Iran women's national football team
- Iran women's national under-17 football team
- Women's football in Iran
