= 2022 CAFA U-19 Futsal Championship =

Central Asian football competition

Tournament details
- Host country: Kyrgyzstan
- City: Bishkek
- Dates: 12–19 February
- Teams: 5 (from 1 sub-confederation)
- Venue: 1 (in 1 host city)

Final positions
- Champions: Iran (1st title)
- Runners-up: Afghanistan
- Third place: Kyrgyzstan
- Fourth place: Uzbekistan

Tournament statistics
- Matches played: 10
- Goals scored: 77 (7.7 per match)
- Attendance: 1,055 (106 per match)
- Top scorer(s): (Kyrgyzstan) Bektur Iliasov (6 goals)
- Best player: (Afghanistan) Omid Qanbari
- Fair play award: Iran

The 2022 CAFA U-19 Futsal Championship was the inaugural edition of the CAFA U-19 Futsal Championship, the international youth futsal championship organised by CAFA for the men's under-19 national teams of Central Asia. The tournament was hosted at the Gazprom Arena in Bishkek, Kyrgyzstan from 12 to 19 February 2022.

Iran won the title unbeaten, becoming the first champions of the CAFA U-19 Futsal Championship. Host Kyrgyz Republic finished in third place after securing two wins out of four matches they played.

== Participating teams ==
A total of 5 (out of 6) CAFA member national teams entered the tournament. دوره دوم این مسابقات به میزبانی ایران در سال ۲۰۲۵ برگذار می‌شود که ۶ تیم اصلی این منطقه به علاوه روسیه و ارمنستان که دعوت شده اند برگذار می‌شود

Team	Appearance	Previous best performance
Afghanistan	1st	—
Iran	1st	—
Kyrgyzstan	1st	—
Tajikistan	1st	—
Uzbekistan	1st	—

Did not enter

- Turkmenistan

== Venues ==
Matches were held at the Gazprom Arena.

Bishkek	2022 CAFA U-19 Futsal Championship (Kyrgyzstan)
Gazprom Arena	2022 CAFA U-19 Futsal Championship (Kyrgyzstan)
Capacity: 20,000	2022 CAFA U-19 Futsal Championship (Kyrgyzstan)

== Match officials ==
A total of 10 referees were appointed for the tournament.

Referees

- (Iran) Esmail Kamar Basteh
- (Iran) Ali Ahmadi
- (Kyrgyzstan) Nursultan Salamat Uulu
- (Kyrgyzstan) Eldiiar Keldibekov
- (Kyrgyzstan) Nurbek Arstanbek Uulu
- (Tajikistan) Sukhrob Sattorov
- (Tajikistan) Behruz Murtazoev
- (Uzbekistan) Adham Rihsiboyev
- (Uzbekistan) Khushnudbek Atamuratov
- (Uzbekistan) Anatoly Rubakov

== Squads ==
Each national team have to submit a squad of 14 players, two of whom must be goalkeepers.

== Main tournament ==
The main tournament schedule was announced on 6 February 2022.

Pos	Team	Pld	W	D	L	GF	GA	GD	Pts	Final result
1	Iran	4	4	0	0	25	6	+19	12	Champions
2	Afghanistan	4	3	0	1	21	15	+6	9	Runners-up
3	Kyrgyzstan (H)	4	2	0	2	18	16	+2	6	Third place
4	Uzbekistan	4	1	0	3	8	25	−17	3	
5	Tajikistan	4	0	0	4	5	15	−10	0	

Source: CAFA
Rules for classification: 1) Points; 2) head-to-head matches; 3) Goal difference; 4) Number of goals scored.
(H) Hosts
12 February 2022
15:00

Iran	10–3	Afghanistan
Dehghani 1', 17', 34:37; Taghavi 6', 14' (pen.); Jozari 11'; Mohammadpour 19', 28'; Balkaneh 36:55; Sedighzadi 39:24	Report	Gorgej 14', 16'; Qanbari 23'

Gazprom Arena, Bishkek
Attendance: 159
Referee: Behruz Murtazoev (Tajikistan)
Anatoly Rubakov (Uzbekistan)
Sukhrob Sattorov (Tajikistan)
12 February 2022
18:00

Uzbekistan	3–1	Tajikistan
Eshonkolov 12:13, 33:58; Murodkulov 39:54	Report	Khushvakhtov 13:15

Gazprom Arena, Bishkek
Attendance: 52
Referee: Ali Ahmadi (Iran)
Eldiiar Keldibekov (Kyrgyz Republic)
Esmail Kamar Basteh (Iran)

13 February 2022
15:00

Tajikistan	1–2	Iran
Saidov 37:53	Report	Sedighzadeh 06:36; Nazrizoda 25:58 (o.g.)

Gazprom Arena, Bishkek
Attendance: 37
Referee: Adham Rihsiboyev (Uzbekistan)
Khushnudbek Atamuratov (Uzbekistan)
Nursultan Salamat Uulu (Kyrgyz Republic)
13 February 2022
18:00

Kyrgyzstan	3–5	Afghanistan
Sadykov 08:58; Azamat Uulu 17:49; Iliasov 34:31	Report	Qanbari 00:52, 09:09, 20:46; Nazari 11:44; Hosseini 22:08

Gazprom Arena, Bishkek
Attendance: 235
Referee: Esmail Kamar Basteh (IR Iran)
Sukhrob Sattorov (Tajikistan)
Ali Ahmadi (IR Iran)

15 February 2022
16:00

Afghanistan	5–1	Tajikistan
Qanbari 16:36, 22:24; Nazrizoda 18:26 (o.g.); Nazari 19:25; Hosseini 31:35	Report	Saidov 19:11 (pen.)

Gazprom Arena, Bishkek
Attendance: 55
Referee: Anatoly Rubakov (Uzbekistan)
Nursultan Salamat Uulu (Kyrgyz Republic)
Khushnudbek Atamuratov (Uzbekistan)
15 February 2022
19:00

Kyrgyzstan	9–3	Uzbekistan
Iliasov 06:22, 23:55; Azamat Uulu 07:38, 26:52, 34:21; Karypbekov 09:01; Aianbaev 11:47; Kanatbekov 24:47, 30:25	Report	Eshonkolov 08:52; Safarov 11:32; Akhmedov 13:33

Gazprom Arena, Bishkek
Attendance: 80
Referee: Sukhrob Sattorov (Tajikistan)
Esmail Kamar Basteh (IR Iran)
Behruz Murtazoev (Tajikistan)

17 February 2022
16:00

Afghanistan	8–1	Uzbekistan
Nazari 10:58; Hosseini 12:35, 12:45, 22:19, 32:21; Ghafoori 16:33; Ahmadi 33:11; Mumtaz 36:24	Report	Usmonov 34:39

Gazprom Arena, Bishkek
Attendance: 101
Referee: Eldiiar Keldibekov (Kyrgyz Republic)
Nursultan Salamat Uulu (Kyrgyz Republic)
Esmail Kamar Basteh (IR Iran)
17 February 2022
19:00

Iran	6–1	Kyrgyzstan
Mohammadpour 01:26; Bazyar 03:43; Jozari 08:15, 16:45; Sedighzadeh 31:38; Balkaneh 39:45	Report	Iliasov 09:21

Gazprom Arena, Bishkek
Attendance: 207
Referee: Khushnudbek Atamuratov (Uzbekistan)
Behruz Murtazoev (Tajikistan)
Anatoly Rubakov (Uzbekistan)

19 February 2022
16:00

Uzbekistan	1–7	Iran
Abdukarimov 39:20	Report	Balkaneh 05:47; Jozari 10:54, 20:00; Barahouei 12:24, 13:52, 14:36; Makhramov 27:53 (o.g.)

Gazprom Arena, Bishkek
Attendance: 50
Referee: Nursultan Salamat Uulu (Kyrgyz Republic)
Nurbek Arstanbek Uulu (Kyrgyz Republic)
Behruz Murtazoev (Tajikistan)
19 February 2022
18:00

Tajikistan	2–5	Kyrgyzstan
Khushvakhtov 10:41; Sattorov 12:24	Report	Saipidinov 01:43; Karypbekov 21:57; Kanatbekov 26:13; Iliasov 28:17, 37:29

Gazprom Arena, Bishkek
Attendance: 79
Referee: Adham Rihsiboyev (Uzbekistan)
Ali Ahmadi (IR Iran)
Khushnudbek Atamuratov (Uzbekistan)

== Goalscorers ==
There were 77 goals scored in 10 matches, for an average of 7.7 goals per match.

6 goals

- (Afghanistan) Omid Qanbari
- (Afghanistan) Sayed Mojtaba Hosseini
- (Kyrgyzstan) Bektur Iliasov

5 goals

- (Iran) Ali Jozari

4 goals

- (Kyrgyzstan) Ilgiz Azamat Uulu

3 goals

- (Afghanistan) Noorullah Nazari
- (Iran) Amirhamzeh Sedighzadeh
- (Iran) Amirhossein Dehghani
- (Iran) Erfan Mohammadpour
- (Iran) Milad Barahouei
- (Iran) Soran Balkaneh
- (Kyrgyzstan) Aimen Kanatbekov
- (Uzbekistan) Daler Eshonkulov

2 goals

- (Afghanistan) Bahman Gorgej
- (Iran) Amirhossein Taghavi
- (Kyrgyzstan) Bekmat Karypbekov
- (Tajikistan) Saidisroil Saidov
- (Tajikistan) Dzhovidon Khushvakhtov

1 goal

- (Afghanistan) Abul Bashir Ahmadi
- (Afghanistan) Hamidullah Ghafoori
- (Afghanistan) Mohammad Ali Mumtaz
- (Iran) Mohammad Hossein Bazyar
- (Kyrgyzstan) Adil Aianbaev
- (Kyrgyzstan) Ernest Saipidinov
- (Kyrgyzstan) Kanat Sadykov
- (Uzbekistan) Doston Usmonov
- (Uzbekistan) Alan Akhmedov
- (Uzbekistan) Kosimjon Safarov
- (Uzbekistan) Mirshod Abdukarimov
- (Uzbekistan) Samandar Murodkulov
- (Tajikistan) Haidar Sattorov

1 own goal

- (Uzbekistan) Umidjon Makhramov (against Iran)

2 own goals

- (Tajikistan) Umed Nazrizoda (against Iran and Afghanistan)

Source: CAFA

== Awards ==
The following awards were given at the conclusion of the tournament:

The ranking for the Top Goalscorer was determined using the following criteria: goals, assists and fewest minutes played.

Top Goalscorer	Best player	Fair Play award	Special award
(Kyrgyzstan) Bektur Iliasov (6 goals)	(Afghanistan) Omid Qanbari	Iran	Uzbekistan
