= 2016 CAFA U-19 Women's Championship =

Tournament details
- Host country: Uzbekistan
- City: Tashkent
- Dates: 14–16 October
- Teams: 4 (from 1 sub-confederation)
- Venue(s): 1 (in 1 host city)

Final positions
- Champions: Uzbekistan (1st title)
- Runners-up: Iran
- Third place: Kyrgyzstan
- Fourth place: Tajikistan

Tournament statistics
- Matches played: 6
- Goals scored: 30 (5 per match)

The 2016 CAFA U-19 Women's Championship was the inaugural edition of CAFA U-19 Women's Championship, the international women's football championship organised by Central Asian Football Association for the women's under-19 national teams of Central Asia. Uzbekistan hosted The tournament from 14 to 16 October 2016.

Uzbekistan were crowned the inaugural champions, after they topped the standings undefeated in all of its matches.

== Participating teams ==
Four (out of 6) CAFA members entered the tournament.

| Team | App. | Previous best performance |
|---|---|---|
| Iran | 1st | Debut |
| Kyrgyzstan | 1st | debut |
| Tajikistan | 1st | Debut |
| Uzbekistan | 1st | Debut |

Did not enter

- Afghanistan
- Turkmenistan

== Venues ==
All matches were held in the JAR Stadium in the capital city Tashkent.

| Tashkent | 2016 CAFA U-19 Women's Championship (Uzbekistan) |
| JAR Stadium | 2016 CAFA U-19 Women's Championship (Uzbekistan) |
| Capacity: 8,500 | 2016 CAFA U-19 Women's Championship (Uzbekistan) |

== Main tournament ==
The main tournament schedule was announced on 13 October 2016.

| Pos | Team | Pld | W | D | L | GF | GA | GD | Pts | Final result |
|---|---|---|---|---|---|---|---|---|---|---|
| 1 | Uzbekistan (H) | 3 | 3 | 0 | 0 | 16 | 1 | +15 | 9 | Champions |
| 2 | Iran | 3 | 2 | 0 | 1 | 10 | 4 | +6 | 6 | Runners-up |
| 3 | Kyrgyzstan | 3 | 0 | 1 | 2 | 2 | 10 | −8 | 1 | Third place |
| 4 | Tajikistan | 3 | 0 | 1 | 2 | 2 | 15 | −13 | 1 | |

Source: CAFA
Rules for classification: 1) Points; 2) head-to-head matches; 3) Goal difference; 4) Number of goals scored.
(H) Hosts
15 October 2016
11:00

| Tajikistan | 1–8 | Uzbekistan |
|---|---|---|
| Safarova | Report |

JAR Stadium, Tashkent
15 October 2016
14:00

| Iran | 4–1 | Kyrgyzstan |
|---|---|---|
| 2' (pen.); 30' (pen.); 37'; 46' | | Boronbekova 18' (pen.) |

JAR Stadium, Tashkent

16 October 2016
11:00

| Tajikistan | 0–6 | Iran |
|---|---|---|
| | Report | Chatrenoor 11' (pen.), 28'; Anafjeh 16'; Ghasemi 24' (pen.), 25'; Salehipour 80' |

JAR Stadium, Tashkent
Referee: Edita Mirabidova (Uzbekistan)
16 October 2016
14:00

| Uzbekistan | 5–0 | Kyrgyzstan |

JAR Stadium, Tashkent

17 October 2016
11:00

| Kyrgyzstan | 1–1 | Tajikistan |
|---|---|---|
| Podskrebko 78' (pen.) | Report | Fayzulloeva 90' |

JAR Stadium, Tashkent
17 October 2016
14:00

| Iran | 0–3 | Uzbekistan |

JAR Stadium, Tashkent

== Goalscorers ==
There were 30 goals scored in 6 matches, for an average of 5 goals per match.

2 goals

- (Iran) Afsaneh Chatrenoor
- (Iran) Fatemeh Ghasemi

1 goal

- (Iran) Elham Anafjeh
- (Iran) Ghazaleh Salehipour
- (Iran) ??
- (Iran) ??
- (Iran) ??
- (Iran) ??
- (Kyrgyzstan) Elizaveta Podskrebko
- (Kyrgyzstan) Aizhan Boronbekova
- (Tajikistan) Marjona Fayzulloeva
- (Tajikistan) Zulaikho Safarova
- (Uzbekistan) ??
- (Uzbekistan) ??
- (Uzbekistan) ??
- (Uzbekistan) ??
- (Uzbekistan) ??
- (Uzbekistan) ??
- (Uzbekistan) ??
- (Uzbekistan) ??
- (Uzbekistan) ??
- (Uzbekistan) ??
- (Uzbekistan) ??
- (Uzbekistan) ??
- (Uzbekistan) ??
- (Uzbekistan) ??
- (Uzbekistan) ??
- (Uzbekistan) ??

Source: CAFA

== Champion ==
2016 CAFA U-19 Girls Championship winners

Uzbekistan
First title
