= Aria Barzegar =

Iranian footballer

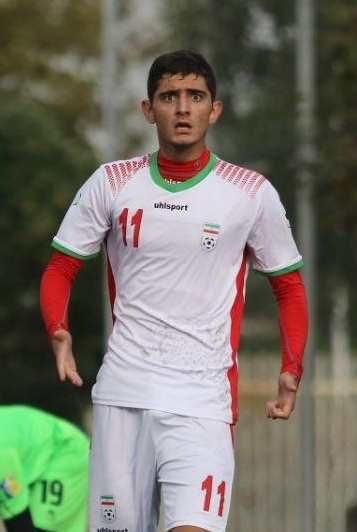
- Barzegar with Iran U20 in 2019

Personal information
- Full name: Seyed Aria Barzegar
- Date of birth: 10 October 2002 (age 24)
- Place of birth: Shiraz, Iran
- Height: 1.89 m (6 ft 2 in)
- Position: Forward

Team information
- Current team: Zob Ahan
- Number: 18

Youth career
- 2014–2018: Khalij Fars Shiraz (Academy)
- 2019–2020: Persepolis Academy

Senior career*
Years	Team	Apps	(Gls)
2020–2021	Persepolis	0	(0)
2021	→ Fajr Sepasi (loan)	2	(0)
2022	Vitebsk	5	(0)
2022–2023	Naft Masjed Soleyman	19	(0)
2023	Esteghlal	0	(0)
2023–2025	Nassaji Mazandaran	23	(0)
2025–	Zob Ahan	2	(0)

International career^{‡}
2017–2018	Iran U16	2	(1)
2019	Iran U18	3	(1)
2019	Iran U19	7	(5)
2021–	Iran U23	3	(0)
2022–	Iran	1	(0)
- * Club domestic league appearances and goals as of 31 May 2024 ‡ National team caps and goals as of 10 November 2022

Aria Barzegar (Persian: آریا برزگر; born 10 October 2002) is an Iranian professional footballer who plays as a forward for Zob Ahan in the Persian Gulf Pro League.

== Club career ==
=== Persepolis ===
In October 2019, he signed a three-year contract with the club. He continued to play in the youth team. In 2020, he was on bench in 2020 AFC Champions League Final with number 25.

=== Fajr Sepasi (loan) ===
In March 2021, he went on loan to Fajr Sepasi from the Azadegan League. He made his debut for the club on 24 April 2021 in a match against Pars Jonoubi. At the end of the 2020–2021 season, he became the winner of the championship. In August 2021, he left the club.

=== Vitebsk ===
In March 2022, he moved to the Belarusian club Vitebsk. He made his debut for the club on 7 April 2022, in the Belarusian Cup against Gomel. He made his debut in the Premier League on 11 April 2022, in a match against Arsenal Dzerzhinsky. In July 2022, information appeared that the footballer would leave the club during the summer transfer window. On 17 July 2022, the club announced the termination of the contract with the player by agreement of the parties.

=== Naft MIS ===
In July 2022, he moved to the Iranian club Tractor. Then he soon became a player in the Naft MIS club. He made his debut for Naft Masjed Soleyman in Persian Gulf Pro League on 25 August 2022, appearing off the bench against Paykan in 3rd week of 2022–23 Persian Gulf Pro League.

== International career ==
Barzegar made his debut for the Iran national team in 2022 at aged 21 in a 1–0 friendly win over Nicaragua on 10 November 2022.

== Honours ==
Persepolis

- Persian Gulf Pro League : 2019–2020
- AFC Champions League Runner-up : 2020

Fajr Sepasi

- Azadegan League : 2020–21

Iran U19

- CAFA Junior Championship 2019
