= Mirabror Usmanov =

Uzbek politician (1947–2019)

- Мираброр Усманов

Member of the Senate of the Oliy Majlis of the Republic of Uzbekistan
- In office 2005–2019

President of the Central Asian Football Federation
- In office 2015–2018
- Preceded by: Office established
- Succeeded by: Umid Akhmadjanov

President of the Football Federation of Uzbekistan
- In office 2005–2017
- Preceded by: Zokir Almatov
- Succeeded by: Umid Akhmadjanov

Personal details
- Born: Mirabror Zufarovich Usmanov; 4 July 1947 Tashkent, Uzbek SSR, Soviet Union (now Uzbekistan)
- Died: March 15, 2019 (aged 71) Tashkent, Uzbekistan
- Education: Samarkand Cooperative Institute

Mirabror Zufarovich Usmanov (Uzbek Latin: Mirabror Zufarovich Usmonov, Uzbek Cyrillic: Мираброр Зуфарович Усмoнов; 4 July 1947 – 15 March 2019) Uzbek statesman, political and sports figure, president of the National Olympic Committee of Uzbekistan, the Football Federation of Uzbekistan, the Football Federation of Central Asia, and Uzbek Senator (2005–2010).

== Biography ==
=== Early life ===
He was born on July 4, 1947, in Tashkent. In 1978 he graduated from the Samarkand Cooperative Institute, majoring in economics.

=== Career ===
From 1961 to 1967 Usmanov was a sixth grade chef at the Bakhor restaurant in Tashkent. In 1970 he was the head of production at the Guliston restaurant in Tashkent. From 1970 to 1986 Usmanov worked as director of the Dustlik and Zarafshan restaurants, director of the Tashkent restaurants trust. From 1986 to 1990 he was head of the Main Department of Public Catering of the Executive Committee of Tashkent.

From 1990 to 1992 he held the position of Minister of Trade of the Republic of Uzbekistan. From 1992 to 1994 he was the chairman of the Uzbeksavdo company. From 1994 to 2005 Usmanov was Deputy Prime Minister of the Republic of Uzbekistan and was in charge of trade.

From 2005 to 2010 - a senator working on a permanent basis in the Committee of the Senate of the Oliy Majlis of the Republic of Uzbekistan on foreign policy issues.

From 2006 to 2017 - President of the Football Federation of Uzbekistan.

From 2013 to 2017 - President of the National Olympic Committee of Uzbekistan.

From 2015 to 2017 - President of the Central Asian Football Federation.

=== Death ===
He died 15 March 2019, in Tashkent.

== Awards ==
- Orden "Mehnat Shuhrati" (1995)
- Certificate of honor of the Republic of Uzbekistan (1997)
- Memorable sign "O'zbekiston mustaqilligiga 15 yil" (2006)
- Orden "Fidokorona xizmatlari uchun" (2007)
- Orden "El-yurt xurmati" (2011)
- FIFA Order of Merit (2014)
