= 2022 CAFA U-18 Women's Championship =

Tournament details
- Host country: Tajikistan
- City: Dushanbe
- Dates: 9–16 March
- Teams: 5 (from 1 sub-confederation)
- Venue: 1 (in 1 host city)

Final positions
- Champions: Iran (1st title)
- Runners-up: Uzbekistan
- Third place: Kyrgyzstan
- Fourth place: Tajikistan

Tournament statistics
- Matches played: 6
- Goals scored: 27 (4.5 per match)
- Attendance: 421 (70 per match)
- Top scorer(s): (Iran) Negin Zandi (6 goals)
- Best player: (Iran) Seyedeh Katehsari
- Fair play award: Kyrgyzstan

the 2022 CAFA U-18 Women's Championship was the inaugural edition of the CAFA U-18 Women's Championship, the biennial international youth football championship organized by the CAFA for the women's under-18 national teams of Central Asia.Tajikistan hosted the tournament. A total of four teams played in the tournament, with players born on or after 1 January 2004 eligible to participate.

Iran were crowned the inaugural champions after finishing the tournament undefeated.

== Participation ==
=== Participating teams ===
A total of 4 (out of 6) CAFA nations entered the competition.

Team	App.	Previous best performance
Iran	1st	—N/a
Kyrgyzstan	1st	—N/a
Tajikistan	1st	—N/a
Uzbekistan	1st	—N/a

Did not enter

- Afghanistan
- Turkmenistan

== Venues ==
Matches were held at the Republic Central Stadium.

Dushanbe	2022 CAFA U-18 Women's Championship (Tajikistan)
Republic Central Stadium	2022 CAFA U-18 Women's Championship (Tajikistan)
Capacity: 20,000	2022 CAFA U-18 Women's Championship (Tajikistan)

== Match officials ==
The following officials were appointed for the tournament:

Referees

- (Kyrgyzstan) Malika Kadirova
- (Iran) Sahar Bibak
- (Tajikistan) Munisa Mirzoeva
- (Uzbekistan) Anna Sidorova

Assistant referees

- (Kyrgyzstan) Keremet Ismailova
- (Iran) Hadiseh Mahdavi
- (Iran) Zahra Emdadi
- (Tajikistan) Zukhal Khuchanazarova
- (Tajikistan) Intizora Solihova
- (Uzbekistan) Zilola Rahmatova

== Main tournament ==
The main tournament schedule was announced on 6 May 2022.

Pos	Team	Pld	W	D	L	GF	GA	GD	Pts	Final result
1	Iran	3	3	0	0	14	1	+13	9	Champions
2	Uzbekistan	3	1	1	1	9	3	+6	4	Runners-up
3	Kyrgyzstan	3	1	1	1	3	3	0	4	Third place
4	Tajikistan (H)	3	0	0	3	1	20	−19	0	

Source: CAFA
Rules for classification: 1) Points; 2) head-to-head matches; 3) Goal difference; 4) Number of goals scored.
(H) Hosts
11 March 2022
14:00

Uzbekistan	0–1	Iran
	Report (CAFA)	Zandi 35'

Republic Central Stadium, Dushanbe
Attendance: 30
Referee: Malika Kadirova (Kyrgyz Republic)
11 March 2022
17:00

Tajikistan	0–1	Kyrgyzstan
	Report (CAFA)	Karataeva 55'

Republic Central Stadium, Dushanbe
Attendance: 110
Referee: Sahar Bibak (IR Iran)

13 March 2022
14:00

Kyrgyzstan	1–1	Uzbekistan
Turgumbaeva 31'	Report (CAFA)	Turgunova 65'

Republic Central Stadium, Dushanbe
Attendance: 40
Referee: Munisa Mirzoeva (Tajikistan)
13 March 2022
17:00

Iran	11–0	Tajikistan
Zandi 5', 34', 71', 73'; Didar 26'; Foroozandeh 45+2'; Masoumi Katehsari 55', 62', 75'; Kafi 85'; Zolfi 89'	Report (CAFA)

Republic Central Stadium, Dushanbe
Attendance: 78
Referee: Anna Sidorova (Uzbekistan)

15 March 2022
14:00

Iran	2–1	Kyrgyzstan
Afshardoost 55'; Zandi 60'	Report (CAFA)	Murzakulova 27'

Republic Central Stadium, Dushanbe
Attendance: 43
Referee: Anna Sidorova (Uzbekistan)
15 March 2022
17:00

Tajikistan	1–8	Uzbekistan
Davlyatova 90' (pen.)	Report (CAFA)	Mamatkarimova 20'; Abdukarimova 27'; Rustullaeva 52', 57', 58', 77'; Kuchkorova 84' (pen.); Saydabbosova 87'

Republic Central Stadium, Dushanbe
Attendance: 120
Referee: Malika Kadirova (Kyrgyz Republic)

== Player awards ==
The following awards were given at the conclusion of the tournament:

Top Goalscorer	Best player	Fair Play award	Special award
(Iran) Negin Zandi (6 goals)	(Iran) Seyedeh Masoumi Katehsari	Kyrgyzstan	Tajikistan

== Goalscorers ==
There were 27 goals scored in 6 matches, for an average of 4.5 goals per match.

6 goals

- (Iran) Negin Zandi Dareh Gharibi

4 goals

- (Uzbekistan) Leyla Rustullaeva

3 goals

- (Iran) Seyedeh Zahra Masoumi Katehsari

1 goal

- (Iran) Sara Didar
- (Iran) Hasti Foroozandeh
- (Iran) Kimia Kafi
- (Iran) Mohaddeseh Zolfi
- (Iran) Elaheh Afshardoost
- (Kyrgyzstan) Aiana Karataeva
- (Kyrgyzstan) Asem Turgumbaeva
- (Kyrgyzstan) Nursuluu Murzakulova
- (Tajikistan) Madina Davlyatova
- (Uzbekistan) Oydinoy Turgunova
- (Uzbekistan) Zarina Mamatkarimova
- (Uzbekistan) Makhzuna Abdukarimova
- (Uzbekistan) Sevinch Kuchkorova
- (Uzbekistan) Rukhshona Saydabbosova

Source: CAFA
