= Tajikistan national under-20 football team =

National sports team

Tajikistan
- Association: Tajikistan Football Federation
- Confederation: AFC (Asia)
- Head coach: Miloš Kostić
- Home stadium: Pamir Stadium, Dushanbe
- FIFA code: TJK
First colours	Second colours

AFC U-20 Asian Cup
- Appearances: 5 (first in 2006)
- Best result: Quarter-finals (2016, 2018)

The Tajikistan national under-20 football team is a national association football youth team of Tajikistan and is controlled by the Tajikistan Football Federation and represents Tajikistan in international under-20 football competitions.

== Tournament records ==
=== FIFA U-20 World Cup ===
Year	Result	Pld	W	D	L	GF	GA
(Qatar) 1995~ (Chile) 2025	DNQ	–	–	–	–	–	–
(Azerbaijan) (Uzbekistan) 2027	TBD	–	–	–	–	–	–
Total		0	0	0	0	0	0

- 2006 AFC Youth Championship
- 2008 AFC U-19 Championship
- 2016 AFC U-19 Championship
- 2018 AFC U-19 Championship
- 2023 AFC U-20 Asian Cup

== Results and fixtures ==
31 August 2026 2027 AFC U-20 Asian Cup qualification	Tajikistan	2–3	Bahrain	Isa Town, Bahrain
20:30	Murotov 14'; Ahmed 90+1' (o.g.)	Report	Mahran 6', 44', 90'	Stadium: Khalifa Sports City Stadium; Referee: Ali Al Ashkar (Lebanon)

3 September 2026 2027 AFC U-20 Asian Cup qualification	Afghanistan	1–4	Tajikistan	Isa Town, Bahrain
17:00	Hotak 30'	Report	Sharopov 19'; Kamolov 22'; Odilzoda 37'; Makhtomov 88'	Stadium: Khalifa Sports City Stadium; Referee: Amir Arab Baraghi (Iran)

6 September 2026 2027 AFC U-20 Asian Cup qualification	Jordan	0–1	Tajikistan	Isa Town, Bahrain
17:00		Report	Isakov 55'	Stadium: Khalifa Sports City Stadium; Referee: Zhang Lei (China)

== Current squad ==
- The following 23 players were called up for the 2016 AFC U-19 Championship:
- Caps and goals are correct as of October 20, 2016, after the match against Australia.
- Caps and goals are correct excluding friendly matches and unrecognized tournaments such as Arab U-20 Championship.

=== Recent squad ===
No.	Pos.	Player	Date of birth (age)	Club
1	GK	Ismoilov Shahrom		(Tajikistan Football Federation)
2	DF	Nurmatov Khuseyn		(Tajikistan Football Federation)
3	DF	Tabrezi Davlatmir		(Tajikistan Football Federation)
4	FW	Davlatbekov Munir		(Tajikistan Football Federation)
5	FW	Ergashev Dorobjon		(Tajikistan Football Federation)
6	DF	Alisheri Khotam		(Tajikistan Football Federation)
7	MF	Saidov Karomatullo (captain)		(Tajikistan Football Federation)
8	MF	Ziyoev Hojiboy		(Tajikistan Football Federation)
9	FW	Muhammadjoni Hasan		(Tajikistan Football Federation)
10	FW	Parpiev Mukhsinzhon		(Tajikistan Football Federation)
11	FW	Hamroqulov Nuriddin		(Tajikistan Football Federation)
12	FW	Safarov Amirdzhon		(Tajikistan Football Federation)
13	FW	Rustam Tolibov		(Tajikistan Football Federation)
14	DF	Hanonov Vahdat		(Tajikistan Football Federation)
15	MF	Zoir Jurabaev		(Tajikistan Football Federation)
16	GK	Boboev Fathullp		(Tajikistan Football Federation)
17	MF	Ehsoni Panshanbe		(Tajikistan Football Federation)
18	MF	Yodgorov Daler		(Tajikistan Football Federation)
19	DF	Rakhmonov Azimchon		(Tajikistan Football Federation)
20	DF	Fuzaylov Ziyovuddin		(Tajikistan Football Federation)
21	FW	Boboev Sheriddin		(Tajikistan Football Federation)
22	MF	Karimov Otabek		(Tajikistan Football Federation)
23	GK	Behruz Khayriev		(Tajikistan Football Federation)

== Head-to-head record ==
The following table shows Tajikistan's head-to-head record in the AFC U-20 Asian Cup.

Opponent	Pld	W	D	L	GF	GA	GD	Win %
Australia	1	0	1	0	0	0	+0	0.00
China	3	2	0	1	3	6	−3	66.67
Iran	1	0	0	1	1	3	−2	0.00
Japan	2	0	0	2	0	8	−8	0.00
Jordan	1	0	0	1	0	2	−2	0.00
Lebanon	1	1	0	0	5	1	+4	100.00
Malaysia	1	0	1	0	2	2	+0	0.00
North Korea	2	0	1	1	1	2	−1	0.00
Oman	1	1	0	0	1	0	+1	100.00
Saudi Arabia	1	0	0	1	1	3	−2	0.00
South Korea	2	0	1	1	0	1	−1	0.00
Uzbekistan	1	0	0	1	1	2	−1	0.00
Total	17	4	4	9	15	30	−15	23.53
