= Turkmenistan national under-21 football team =

Turkmen international youth football team

Turkmenistan U-21
- Association: Football Federation of Turkmenistan
- Confederation: AFC (Asia)
- Head coach: Ahmet Agamyradow
- Captain: Mekan Saparow
- Home stadium: Ashgabat Stadium
- FIFA code: TKM

Biggest win
- Northern Mariana Islands 0–7 Turkmenistan (Amman, Jordan; 10 September 2022)

Biggest defeat
- Turkmenistan 0–4 Finland (St.Petersburg, Russia; 23 January 2015)

The Turkmenistan national under-21 football team represents Turkmenistan in international under-21 football competitions. It is controlled by the Football Federation of Turkmenistan and is a member of the Asian Football Confederation.

== Coaching staff ==
- Head coach: Ahmet Agamyradow
- Coach: Fazil Mamedov
- Administrator: Babanazar Haknazarov
- Doctor: Maksatmyrat Ilyasov

== Current squad ==
The selections for 2015 Commonwealth of Independent States Cup on January 16–25, 2015.

No.	Pos.	Player	Date of birth (age)	Caps	Goals	Club
1	GK	Ibrayym Niyazberdiyev	22 April 1996 (age 30)	0	0	(Football Federation of Turkmenistan) FC HTTU
16	GK	Dovletyar Berdiyev	5 May 1998 (age 28)	0	0	(Football Federation of Turkmenistan) FC Altyn Tach
25	GK	Rahat Japarov	22 January 1996 (age 30)	0	0	(Russian Football Union) FC Domodedovo Moscow
2	DF	Güýçmyrat Annagulyýew	10 February 1996 (age 30)	0	0	(Football Federation of Turkmenistan) Balkan
3	DF	Hoshgeldi Hojovov	28 February 1996 (age 30)	0	0	(Football Federation of Turkmenistan) FC HTTU
4	DF	Mekan Saparow	22 April 1994 (age 32)	6	1	(Football Federation of Turkmenistan) Balkan
15	DF	Islamberdi Bayramov	1 February 1997 (age 29)	0	0	(Football Federation of Turkmenistan) FC Altyn Tach
17	DF	Serdargeldi Kabayev	19 January 1997 (age 29)	0	0	(Football Federation of Turkmenistan) FC Altyn Tach
18	DF	Dovletgeldi Mirsultanov	29 May 1995 (age 31)	0	0	(Football Federation of Turkmenistan) FC HTTU
22	DF	Elyasberdi Berenov	26 July 1995 (age 31)	0	0	(Football Federation of Turkmenistan) Talyp Sporty
6	MF	Begench Akmammedov	1 June 1998 (age 28)	0	0	(Football Federation of Turkmenistan) FC Altyn Tach
8	MF	Yhlas Saparmammedov	25 February 1997 (age 29)	0	0	(Football Federation of Turkmenistan) FC Altyn Tach
9	MF	Resul Hojaýew	7 January 1997 (age 29)	0	0	(Football Federation of Turkmenistan) FC Altyn Tach
10	MF	Gurban Annayev	10 May 1995 (age 31)	0	0	(Football Federation of Turkmenistan) FC Ahal
11	MF	Elyas Akyyev	13 January 1996 (age 30)	0	0	(Football Federation of Turkmenistan) FC Talyp Sporty
13	MF	Movlamberdi Goshanov	13 August 1995 (age 31)	0	0	(Football Federation of Turkmenistan) FC Talyp Sporty
14	MF	Begmyrat Bayov	5 July 1998 (age 28)	0	0	(Football Federation of Turkmenistan) FC Altyn Tach
19	MF	Berdimyrat Rejepov	19 June 1995 (age 31)	0	0	(Football Federation of Turkmenistan) FC Ahal
22	MF	Yenish Seydiyev	14 January 1995 (age 31)	0	0	(Football Federation of Turkmenistan) FC Ashgabat
7	FW	Didargeldi Kovusov	11 January 1995 (age 31)	0	0	(Football Federation of Turkmenistan) Talyp Sporty
20	FW	Selim Nurmyradow	22 March 1996 (age 30)	0	0	(Russian Football Union) Rubin Kazan

== Results and upcoming fixtures ==
31 August 2026 2027 AFC U-20 Asian Cup qualification	Iraq	1–2	Turkmenistan	Chonburi
15:30	Malik 59'	Report	Gowşudow 15'; Orazdurdyýew 77'	Stadium: Chonburi Stadium; Referee: Ahmad Alaeddin (Lebanon)

3 September 2026 2027 AFC U-20 Asian Cup qualification	Turkmenistan	0–1	Thailand	Chonburi
19:30		Report	Pikulhom 57'	Stadium: Chonburi Stadium; Referee: Aditya Purkayastha (India)

6 September 2026 2027 AFC U-20 Asian Cup qualification	United Arab Emirates	3–2	Turkmenistan	Chonburi
15:30	Muller 62', 81'; Al Jneibi 84'	Report	Gowşudow 8'; Charryev 19'	Stadium: Chonburi Stadium

== See also ==
- Turkmenistan national football team
- Turkmenistan national under-23 football team
- Turkmenistan national under-19 football team
- Turkmenistan national under-17 football team
