= Afghanistan national under-20 football team =

Afghanistan U-20
- Association: Afghanistan Football Federation (AFF)
- Confederation: AFC (Asia)
- FIFA code: AFG

AFC U-19 Championship
- Appearances: 3 (first in 1975)
- Best result: Quarter-finals (1977)

CAFA U-20 Championship
- Appearances: 3 (first in 2023)
- Best result: Fourth place (2023)

The Afghanistan national under-20 football team is controlled by the Afghanistan Football Federation and represents Afghanistan in international football competitions at this age.

== Competitive record ==
=== FIFA U-20 World Cup ===
FIFA U-20 World Cup record
Year	Round	Position	Pld	W	D	L	GF	GA	Squad
(Tunisia) 1977	Did not qualify								
(Japan) 1979	Did not qualify								
(Australia) 1981	Did not qualify								
(Mexico) 1983	Did not qualify								
(Soviet Union) 1985	Did not qualify								
(Chile) 1987	Did not qualify								
(Saudi Arabia) 1989	Did not qualify								
(Portugal) 1991	Did not qualify								
(Australia) 1993	Did not qualify								
(Qatar) 1995	Did not qualify								
(Malaysia) 1997	Did not qualify								
(Nigeria) 1999	Did not qualify								
(Argentina) 2001	Did not qualify								
(United Arab Emirates) 2003	Did not qualify								
(Netherlands) 2005	Did not qualify								
(Canada) 2007	Did not qualify								
(Egypt) 2009	Did not qualify								
(Colombia) 2011	Did not qualify								
(Turkey) 2013	Did not qualify								
(New Zealand) 2015	Did not qualify								
(South Korea) 2017	Did not qualify								
(Poland) 2019	Did not qualify								
(Argentina) 2023	Did not qualify								
(Chile) 2025	Did not qualify								
(Azerbaijan) (Uzbekistan) 2027	To be determined								
Total	—	0/24	0	0	0	0	0	0	—

=== AFC U-20 Asian Cup ===
AFC U-20 Asian Cup record										Qualification record					
Year	Round	Position	Pld	W	D	L	GF	GA	Squad	Pld	W	D	L	GF	GA
(Federation of Malaya) 1959	Did not enter									Did not enter					
(Federation of Malaya) 1960	Did not enter									Did not enter					
(Thailand) 1961	Did not enter									Did not enter					
(Thailand) 1962	Did not enter									Did not enter					
(Federation of Malaya) 1963	Did not enter									Did not enter					
(South Vietnam) 1964	Did not enter									Did not enter					
(Japan) 1965	Did not enter									Did not enter					
(Philippines) 1966	Did not enter									Did not enter					
(Thailand) 1967	Did not enter									Did not enter					
(South Korea) 1968	Did not enter									Did not enter					
(Thailand) 1969	Did not enter									Did not enter					
(Philippines) 1970	Did not enter									Did not enter					
(Japan) 1971	Did not enter									Did not enter					
(Thailand) 1972	Did not enter									Did not enter					
(Iran) 1973	Did not enter									Did not enter					
(Thailand) 1974	Did not enter									Did not enter					
(Kuwait) 1975	Group stage		4	0	1	3	3	12							
(Thailand) 1976	Did not enter									Did not enter					
(Iran) 1977	Quarter-finals		3	0	1	2	1	8							
(Bangladesh) 1978	Group stage		3	0	0	3	0	11							
(Thailand) 1980	Did not enter									Did not enter					
(Thailand) 1982	Did not enter									Did not enter					
(United Arab Emirates) 1985	Did not enter									Did not enter					
(Saudi Arabia) 1986	Did not enter									Did not enter					
(Qatar) 1988	Did not enter									Did not enter					
(Indonesia) 1990	Did not enter									Did not enter					
(United Arab Emirates) 1992	Did not enter									Did not enter					
(Indonesia) 1994	Did not enter									Did not enter					
(South Korea) 1996	Did not enter									Did not enter					
(Thailand) 1998	Did not enter									Did not enter					
(Iran) 2000	Did not enter									Did not enter					
(Qatar) 2002	Did not enter									Did not enter					
(Malaysia) 2004	Did not qualify									2	0	0	2	1	9
(India) 2006	Did not qualify									0	0	0	0	0	0
(Saudi Arabia) 2008	Did not qualify									Disqualified					
(China) 2010	Did not qualify									5	0	0	5	3	20
(United Arab Emirates) 2012	Did not enter									Did not enter					
(Myanmar) 2014	Did not qualify									4	0	0	4	1	12
(Bahrain) 2016	Did not qualify									3	0	0	3	0	10
(Indonesia) 2018	Withdrew									Withdrew					
(Uzbekistan) 2023	Did not qualify									3	1	0	2	1	4
(China) 2025	Did not qualify									4	1	1	2	1	6
(China) 2027	To be determined									To be determined					
Total	Quarter-finals	3/42	10	0	2	8	4	31	—	21	2	1	18	7	61
