= Uzbekistan national under-20 football team =

National association football team

Uzbekistan
- Nickname: Uzbek: Oq boʻrilar (White Wolves)
- Association: Uzbekistan Football Association
- Confederation: AFC (Asia)
- Head coach: Farhod Nishonov
- Home stadium: Milliy Stadium
- FIFA code: UZB
First colours	Second colours

First international
- Kuwait 1–4 Uzbekistan (Al-Ain, UAE; 24 August 1996)

Biggest win
- Uzbekistan 12–0 Nepal (Tashkent, Uzbekistan; 10 May 2002)

Biggest defeat
- United Arab Emirates 5–0 Uzbekistan (Jeddah, Saudi Arabia; 23 August 2000); Uzbekistan 0–5 North Korea (Yangon, Myanmar; 20 October 2014)

FIFA U-20 World Cup
- Appearances: 6 (first in 2003)
- Best result: Quarterfinals (2013, 2015)

AFC U-20 Asian Cup
- Appearances: 9 (first in 2002)
- Best result: Champions (2023)

The Uzbekistan national under-20 football team represents Uzbekistan in international under-20 football competitions. It is controlled by the Uzbekistan Football Association and is a member of the Asian Football Confederation.

== History ==
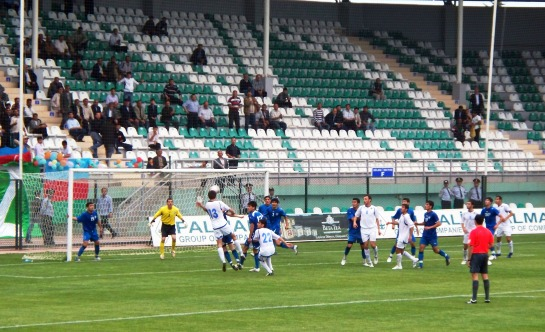
U-20 against Azerbaijan, 20 May 2009

The Uzbekistan national under-19 football team's debut in AFC Youth Championship was in the 2002 tournament in Qatar. Uzbekistan U-19 qualified for the tournament's knockout stages and in the quarter-final beat Syria 4–0. In the semi-final they faced Japan, losing 2–4 in a penalty shootout. In the third place match, the U-19 national team lost to Saudi Arabia. Their best performance in the AFC U-19 Championships was in 2008. In the 2008 AFC U-19 Championship the U-19 team finished runners-up, losing 1–2 in the final to UAE.

Uzbekistan national under-20 football team played six times in FIFA U-20 World Cups. In 2003 and 2009 the team exited in the group stage. In the 2013 World Cup in Turkey, the U-20 team made the play-off and in the Round of 16 beat Greece 3–1, but lost in the quarter-final to France 4–0.

In 2013, the Uzbekistan U-18 team qualified for the 2014 AFC U-19 Championship in Myanmar. They qualified for the quarter-final and beat Thailand U-19 2-1 qualifying directly to the 2015 FIFA U-20 World Cup. In the semi-final match held on 20 October 2014, Uzbekistan was beaten by North Korea 0:5.

In 2023, the team were eliminated in the Round of 16 from the FIFA U-20 World Cup by debutant and eventual third place finisher Israel.

In 2027, Uzbekistan will co-host the FIFA U-20 World Cup along with Azerbaijan, the team also earned an automatic qualification as co-host.

== Competitive record ==
=== FIFA U-20 World Cup ===
FIFA U-20 World Cup record
Year	Result	Pld	W	D	L	GF	GA	Squad
(Tunisia) 1977	Part of Soviet Union							
(Japan) 1979	Part of Soviet Union							
(Australia) 1981	Part of Soviet Union							
(Mexico) 1983	Part of Soviet Union							
(Soviet Union) 1985	Part of Soviet Union							
(Chile) 1987	Part of Soviet Union							
(Saudi Arabia) 1989	Part of Soviet Union							
(Portugal) 1991	Part of Soviet Union							
(Australia) 1993	Did not qualify							
(Qatar) 1995	Did not qualify							
(Malaysia) 1997	Did not qualify							
(Nigeria) 1999	Did not qualify							
(Argentina) 2001	Did not qualify							
(United Arab Emirates) 2003	Group stage	3	0	0	3	3	6	Squad
(Netherlands) 2005	Did not qualify							
(Canada) 2007	Did not qualify							
(Egypt) 2009	Group stage	3	0	1	2	2	6	Squad
(Colombia) 2011	Did not qualify							
(Turkey) 2013	Quarter-finals	5	2	1	2	7	10	Squad
(New Zealand) 2015	Quarter-finals	5	2	0	3	8	8	Squad
(South Korea) 2017	Did not qualify							
(Poland) 2019	Did not qualify							
(Argentina) 2023	Round of 16	4	1	1	2	5	5	Squad
(Chile) 2025	Did not qualify							
(Azerbaijan) (Uzbekistan) 2027	Qualified as co-host							
(Armenia) (Georgia (country)) 2029	To be determined							
Total	Quarter-finals	20	5	3	12	25	35	—

FIFA U-20 World Cup history
Year	Round	Score	Result
2003
2003	Group stage	Uzbekistan 2–3 Mali	Loss
2003	Group stage	Uzbekistan 1–2 Argentina	Loss
2003	Group stage	Uzbekistan 0–1 Spain	Loss
2009
2009	Group stage	Uzbekistan 1–2 Ghana	Loss
2009	Group stage	Uzbekistan 0–3 Uruguay	Loss
2009	Group stage	Uzbekistan 1–1 England	Draw
2013
2013	Group stage	Uzbekistan 3–0 New Zealand	Win
2013	Group stage	Uzbekistan 1–1 Croatia	Draw
2013	Group stage	Uzbekistan 0–4 Uruguay	Loss
2013	Round of 16	Uzbekistan 3–1 Greece	Win
2013	Quarterfinals	Uzbekistan 0–4 France	Loss
2015
2015	Group stage	Uzbekistan 3–4 Honduras	Loss
2015	Group stage	Uzbekistan 0–3 Germany	Loss
2015	Group stage	Uzbekistan 3–0 Fiji	Win
2015	Round of 16	Uzbekistan 2–0 Austria	Win
2015	Quarterfinals	Uzbekistan 0–1 Senegal	Loss
2023
2023	Group stage	Uzbekistan 1–2 Argentina	Loss
2023	Group stage	Uzbekistan 2–2 New Zealand	Draw
2023	Group stage	Uzbekistan 2–0 Guatemala	Win
2023	Round of 16	Uzbekistan 0–1 Israel	Loss

=== AFC U-20 Asian Cup record ===
AFC U-20 Asian Cup finals record										Qualifications record					
Year	Host country	Result	Position	GP	W	D*	L	GS	GA	GP	W	D	L	GS	GA
1994	Indonesia	Did not qualify													
1996	South Korea	Did not qualify								3	2	0	1	10	5
1998	Thailand	Did not qualify								4	1	1	2	9	5
2000	Iran	Did not qualify								4	2	0	2	8	11
2002	Qatar	Fourth place	4th	6	3	1	2	14	11	2	2	0	0	19	0
2004	Malaysia	Quarter-finals	6th	4	2	1	1	9	6	2	2	0	0	8	0
2006	India	Did not qualify								2	1	1	0	3	0
2008	Saudi Arabia	Runners-up	2nd	6	3	2	1	5	3	3	3	0	0	5	1
2010	China	Quarter-finals	5th	4	3	0	1	5	2	2	1	1	0	6	1
2012	United Arab Emirates	Semi-finals	3rd	5	2	2	1	11	7	4	3	0	1	7	4
2014	Myanmar	Semi-finals	4th	5	2	2	1	8	10	4	3	0	1	10	2
2016	Bahrain	Quarter-finals	5th	4	2	1	1	5	5	3	3	0	0	14	0
2018	Indonesia	Did not qualify								4	3	0	1	17	1
~~2020~~	Uzbekistan	Qualified but later cancelled due to the COVID-19 pandemic								3	2	1	0	5	1
2023	Uzbekistan	Champion	1st	6	3	3	0	5	1	4	4	0	0	14	2
2025	China	Quarter-finals	6th	4	2	1	1	8	6	4	4	0	0	21	1
Total		8/14	Best: 1st	44	22	13	9	70	51	48	36	4	8	156	34

Note

- *: Denotes draws including knockout matches decided on penalty kicks

AFC U-20 Asian Cup history
First Match	Uzbekistan 4–0 Thailand (15 October 2002; Doha, Qatar)
Biggest Win	Uzbekistan 4–0 Thailand (15 October 2002; Doha, Qatar); Uzbekistan 4–0 Syria (16 October 2002; Doha, Qatar); Uzbekistan 4–0 Vietnam (4 November 2012; Ras Al Khaimah, United Arab Emirates)
Biggest Defeat	Uzbekistan 0–5 North Korea (20 October 2014; Yangon, Myanmar)
Best Result	Champions at the 2023
Worst Result	Quarter finals at the 4 editions

== Managers ==
- (Uzbekistan) Viktor Borisov (U20): 2003
- (England) Colin Toal (U20): 2005–2006
- (Uzbekistan) Akhmadjon Ubaydullaev (U18–20): 2007–2009
- (Uzbekistan) Marat Kabaev (U18–19): 2009–2010
- (Uzbekistan) Ahmadjon Musaev (U18–20) 2011–2013
- (Uzbekistan) Alexey Evstafeev (U18–19): 2013–2014
- (Uzbekistan) Sergey Lushan (U19): 2014
- (Uzbekistan) Ravshan Khaydarov (U19–20): 2014–2015
- (Uzbekistan) Jasur Abduraimov (U18–19): 2015–2016
- (Uzbekistan) Alexander Mochinov (U18): 2017
- (Uzbekistan) Otabek Gulomkhujaev (U18–19): 2018–2019
- (Uzbekistan) Ildar Magdeev (U18): (2021)
- (Uzbekistan) Ravshan Khaydarov (U18–20): 2022–2023
- (Uzbekistan) Farkhod Nishonov (U18–20): 2024 present

== Team ==
=== Current squad ===
The following players were named in the squad for the 2025 AFC U-20 Asian Cup, to be played in 12 February 2025.

Caps and goals correct as of 22 January 2025, after the match against Qatar.

No.	Pos.	Player	Date of birth (age)	Caps	Goals	Club
1	GK	Maksim Murkaev	21 February 2005 (aged 19)	3	0	(Uzbekistan Football Association) Surkhon
2	DF	Saidkhon Khamidov	20 January 2005 (aged 20)	9	0	(Uzbekistan Football Association) Olympic MobiUz
3	DF	Mukhammadali Zolkhidov	27 January 2005 (aged 20)	7	0	(Uzbekistan Football Association) Pakhtakor
4	DF	Giyosjon Rizakulov	20 February 2005 (aged 19)	16	0	(Uzbekistan Football Association) Qizilqum
5	DF	Azizbek Tulkinbekov	10 February 2007 (aged 18)	17	2	(Uzbekistan Football Association) Bunyodkor
6	MF	Ravshan Khayrullaev	21 August 2005 (aged 19)	16	9	(Uzbekistan Football Association) Bukhara
7	MF	Daler Tukhsanov	11 April 2005 (aged 19)	18	1	(Uzbekistan Football Association) Pakhtakor
8	FW	Amirbek Saidov	1 February 2006 (aged 19)	12	0	(Football Association of Serbia) Jedinstvo
9	FW	Saidumarxon Saidnurullaev	13 April 2005 (aged 19)	13	6	(Uzbekistan Football Association) Pakhtakor
10	FW	Mukhammadali Urinboev	24 April 2005 (aged 19)	15	3	(Uzbekistan Football Association) Pakhtakor
11	FW	Murodjon Komilov	24 January 2005 (aged 20)	16	4	(Uzbekistan Football Association) Kokand 1912
12	GK	Mukhammadyusuf Sobirov	20 April 2006 (aged 18)	11	0	(Uzbekistan Football Association) Sogdiana
13	DF	Bekhruz Djumatov	13 February 2006 (aged 18)	15	0	(Uzbekistan Football Association) Sogdiana
14	DF	Ozodbek Kurbonov	27 February 2005 (aged 19)	4	1	(Uzbekistan Football Association) Olympic MobiUz
15	MF	Lazizbek Mirzaev	5 October 2006 (aged 18)	0	0	(Royal Spanish Football Federation) Leganés
16	MF	Mukhammadali Reimov	26 June 2006 (aged 18)	16	0	(Uzbekistan Football Association) Olympic MobiUz
17	MF	Ollobergan Karimov	17 June 2006 (aged 18)	12	0	(Uzbekistan Football Association) Bunyodkor
18	MF	Narimonjon Akhmadjonov	18 March 2005 (aged 19)	13	0	(Uzbekistan Football Association) Bunyodkor
19	MF	Rustambek Fomin	9 July 2005 (aged 19)	22	1	(Uzbekistan Football Association) Pakhtakor
20	DF	Dilshod Abdullaev	9 May 2006 (aged 18)	15	3	(Uzbekistan Football Association) Pakhtakor
21	GK	Samandar Muratbaev	3 March 2005 (aged 19)	11	0	(Uzbekistan Football Association) Metallurg
22	MF	Asilbek Jumaev	25 March 2005 (aged 19)	12	0	(Uzbekistan Football Association) Surkhon
23	FW	Abdugaffor Khaydarov	16 February 2005 (aged 19)	9	3	(Uzbekistan Football Association) Surkhon

=== Previous squads ===
FIFA U-20 World Cup/Youth Championship squads

- 2015 FIFA U-20 World Cup squads – Uzbekistan
- 2013 FIFA U-20 World Cup squads – Uzbekistan
- 2009 FIFA U-20 World Cup squads – Uzbekistan
- 2003 FIFA World Youth Championship squads – Uzbekistan

AFC U-19 Championship squads

- 2014 AFC U-19 Championship squads – Uzbekistan
- 2012 AFC U-19 Championship squads – Uzbekistan
- 2010 AFC U-19 Championship squads – Uzbekistan
- 2008 AFC U-19 Championship squads – Uzbekistan

== Fixtures and results ==
Win Draw Loss Fixture

=== 2026 ===
31 August 2026 2027 AFC U20 Qualifiers	Uzbekistan	2–0	Bangladesh	Tashkent, Uzbekistan
19:00 UZT	Saydaliev 19'; Kuvonchbek 46'	Report		Stadium: Do'stlik Stadium; Referee: Wiwat Jumpaoon (Thailand)

3 September 2026 2027 AFC U20 Qualifiers	India	0–4	Uzbekistan	Tashkent, Uzbekistan
19:00 UZT		Report	Maratov 29'; Abraev 34'; Shorakhmedov 67'; Sersenbaev 90'	Stadium: Do'stlik Stadium; Referee: Morteza Mansourian (Iran)

6 September 2026 2027 AFC U20 Qualifiers	Uzbekistan	3–0	Syria	Tashkent, Uzbekistan
19:00 UZT	Ermanov 10'; Kuvonchbek 81'; Tulaganov 90+5' (pen.)	Report		Stadium: Do'stlik Stadium; Referee: Du Jianxin (China)

== Head-to-head record ==
The following table shows Uzbekistan's head-to-head record in the FIFA U-20 World Cup and AFC U-20 Asian Cup.

=== In FIFA U-20 World Cup ===
Opponent	Pld	W	D	L	GF	GA	GD	Win %
Argentina	2	0	0	2	2	4	−2	0.00
Austria	1	1	0	0	2	0	+2	100.00
Croatia	1	0	1	0	1	1	+0	0.00
England	1	0	1	0	1	1	+0	0.00
Fiji	1	1	0	0	3	0	+3	100.00
France	1	0	0	1	0	4	−4	0.00
Germany	1	0	0	1	0	3	−3	0.00
Ghana	1	0	0	1	1	2	−1	0.00
Greece	1	1	0	0	3	1	+2	100.00
Guatemala	1	1	0	0	2	0	+2	100.00
Honduras	1	0	0	1	3	4	−1	0.00
Israel	1	0	0	1	0	1	−1	0.00
Mali	1	0	0	1	2	3	−1	0.00
New Zealand	2	1	1	0	5	2	+3	50.00
Senegal	1	0	0	1	0	1	−1	0.00
Spain	1	0	0	1	0	1	−1	0.00
Uruguay	2	0	0	2	0	7	−7	0.00
Total	20	5	3	12	25	35	−10	25.00

=== In AFC U-20 Asian Cup ===
Opponent	Pld	W	D	L	GF	GA	GD	Win %
Australia	4	1	3	0	6	5	+1	25.00
Bahrain	1	1	0	0	1	0	+1	100.00
China	2	0	2	0	0	0	+0	0.00
India	1	1	0	0	2	1	+1	100.00
Indonesia	3	2	1	0	6	2	+4	66.67
Iran	2	0	0	2	1	4	−3	0.00
Iraq	3	3	0	0	4	0	+4	100.00
Japan	1	0	1	0	1	1	+0	0.00
Jordan	2	1	1	0	3	2	+1	50.00
Laos	1	1	0	0	5	2	+3	100.00
North Korea	3	2	0	1	3	5	−2	66.67
Qatar	1	1	0	0	5	4	+1	100.00
Saudi Arabia	2	0	0	2	1	6	−5	0.00
South Korea	6	1	2	3	6	10	−4	16.67
Syria	4	2	2	0	9	3	+6	50.00
Tajikistan	1	1	0	0	2	1	+1	100.00
Thailand	3	3	0	0	7	1	+6	100.00
United Arab Emirates	2	0	1	1	3	4	−1	0.00
Vietnam	1	1	0	0	4	0	+4	100.00
Yemen	1	1	0	0	1	0	+1	100.00
Total	44	22	13	9	70	51	+19	50.00

== See also ==
- Uzbekistan national under-17 football team
- Uzbekistan national under-23 football team
- Uzbekistan national football team
- Uzbekistan national futsal team
