= 2021 CAFA U-15 Championship =

Чемпионат CAFA-2021 среди юношеских сборных (U-15)

Tournament details
- Host country: Tajikistan
- City: Dushanbe
- Dates: 17–24 November
- Teams: 4 (from 1 sub-confederation)
- Venue: (in 1 host city)

Final positions
- Champions: Iran (2nd title)
- Runners-up: Tajikistan
- Third place: Uzbekistan
- Fourth place: Kyrgyzstan

Tournament statistics
- Matches played: 6
- Goals scored: 25 (4.17 per match)
- Attendance: 1,680 (280 per match)
- Top scorer(s): (Tajikistan) Abubakr Sulyamonov (3 goals)
- Best player: (Iran) Esmaeil Gholizadeh
- Fair play award: Kyrgyzstan

the 2021 CAFA U-15 Championship was the third edition of the CAFA U-15 Championship, the international youth football championship organized by CAFA for the men's under-15 national teams of Central Asia. Tajikistan was hosting the tournament. Four nations including the host Tajikistan competed for the title in the eight-day round-robin event, with all teams to cross paths once before the final Matchday on November 23, with players born on or after 1 January 2006 eligible to participate.

Iran were the defending champions having won their first title in 2018. and successfully retained their title after they finished at the top of the standings, edging out host Tajikistan on superior goal difference.

== Participating teams ==
A total of 4 (out of 6) CAFA member national teams entered the tournament.

Team	Appearance	Previous best performance
Iran	2nd	Champions (2018)
Kyrgyzstan	3rd	Fourth place (2017)
Tajikistan	3rd	Third place (2018)
Uzbekistan	3rd	Runners-up (2017, 2018)

Did not enter

- Afghanistan
- Turkmenistan

== Venues ==
All matches were held at the following venue:

Dushanbe	2021 CAFA U-15 Championship (Tajikistan)
Republic Central Stadium	2021 CAFA U-15 Championship (Tajikistan)
Capacity: 20,000	2021 CAFA U-15 Championship (Tajikistan)

== Match officials ==
The following officials were appointed for the tournament:

Referees

- (Iran) Amir Arabbaraghi
- (Kyrgyzstan) Sanzhar Zhakypbekov
- (Tajikistan) Amirjon Korkashev
- (Tajikistan) Abdullo Davlatov
- (Uzbekistan) Abdurashid Khudayberganov

Assistant referees

- (Iran) Farhad Farhadpour
- (Kyrgyzstan) Argen Chyngyz Uulu
- (Tajikistan) Sorban Ahmadzoda
- (Uzbekistan) Bakhtiyorkhuja Shavkatov
- (Uzbekistan) Hasan Nabiyev

== Main tournament ==
The official tournament schedule was revealed on 6 May 2022.

Pos	Team	Pld	W	D	L	GF	GA	GD	Pts	Final result
1	Iran	3	2	1	0	12	3	+9	7	Champions
2	Tajikistan (H)	3	2	1	0	7	1	+6	7	Runners-up
3	Uzbekistan	3	0	1	2	4	6	−2	1	Third place
4	Kyrgyzstan	3	0	1	2	2	15	−13	1	

Source: CAFA
Rules for classification: 1) Points; 2) head-to-head matches; 3) Goal difference; 4) Number of goals scored.
(H) Hosts
19 November 2021
12:00

Uzbekistan	2–3	Iran
Tursunaliev 53'; Mukhtorov 87' (pen.)	Report (CAFA); Report (AFC)	Hobobati 62'; Razaghinia 76'; Aali 90' (pen.)

Republican Central Stadium, Dushanbe
Attendance: 50
Referee: Sanzhar Zhakypbekov (Kyrgyzstan)
19 November 2021
18:00

Tajikistan	5–0	Kyrgyzstan
Sulyamonov 5', 11'; Jalolov 47' (pen.); Zarifi 70'; Boboev 78'	Report (CAFA); Report (AFC)

Republican Central Stadium, Dushanbe
Attendance: 200
Referee: Amir Arabbaraghi (IR Iran)

21 November 2021
12:00

Kyrgyzstan	2–2	Uzbekistan
Temirbekov 13'; Sharipov 84'	Report (CAFA); Report (AFC)	Mukhtorov 25' (pen.); Tursunaliev 90+6'

Republican Central Stadium, Dushanbe
Attendance: 100
Referee: Amirjon Korkashev (Tajikistan)
21 November 2021
15:00

Iran	1–1	Tajikistan
Rahmannejad 7'	Report (CAFA); Report (AFC)	Sulyamonov 17' (pen.)

Republican Central Stadium, Dushanbe
Attendance: 600
Referee: Abdurashid Khudayberganov (Uzbekistan)

23 November 2021
12:00

Iran	8–0	Kyrgyzstan
Gholizadeh 32', 50'; Hobobati 40'; Aali 54'; Ghandipour 59'; Taheri 68', 84'; Rahmannejad 72'	Report (CAFA); Report (AFC)

Republican Central Stadium, Dushanbe
Attendance: 30
Referee: Abdullo Davlatov (Tajikistan)
23 November 2021
15:00

Tajikistan	1–0	Uzbekistan
Gafurov 58'	Report (CAFA); Report (AFC)

Republican Central Stadium, Dushanbe
Attendance: 700
Referee: Sanzhar Zhakypbekov (Kyrgyz Republic)

== Player awards ==
The following awards were given at the conclusion of the tournament:

Top Goalscorer	Best player	Fair Play award	Special award
(Tajikistan) Abubakr Sulyamonov (3 goals)	(Iran) Esmaeil Gholizadeh	Tajikistan	Kyrgyzstan

== Goalscorers ==
There were 25 goals scored in 6 matches, for an average of 4.17 goals per match.

3 goals

- (Tajikistan) Abubakar Sulyamonov

2 goals

- (Iran) Ali Rahmannejad
- (Iran) Erfan Darvish Aali
- (Iran) Esmaeil Gholizadeh Samian
- (Iran) Kasra Taheri
- (Iran) Samir Hobobati
- (Uzbekistan) Ibrohimjon Tursunaliev
- (Uzbekistan) Zikrillokhon Mukhtorov

1 goal

- (Iran) Reza Ghandipour
- (Iran) Amirmohammad Razaghinia
- (Kyrgyzstan) Aidar Sharipov
- (Kyrgyzstan) Emirkhan Temirbekov
- (Tajikistan) Amirkhon Jalolov
- (Tajikistan) Aziz Zarifi
- (Tajikistan) Bilol Boboev
- (Tajikistan) Masrur Gafurov

Source: CAFA
