= 2025 CAFA U-17 Women's Championship =

CAFA U-17 Women's Championship 2025
Чемпионат CAFA-2025 среди женских юниорских сборных до 17 лет

Tournament details
- Host country: Tajikistan
- City: Dushanbe
- Dates: 4–8 March
- Teams: 4 (from 1 sub-confederation)
- Venue: 1 (in 1 host city)

Final positions
- Champions: Uzbekistan (3rd title)
- Runners-up: Iran
- Third place: Kyrgyz Republic

Tournament statistics
- Matches played: 6
- Goals scored: 9 (1.5 per match)
- Top scorer: (Iran) Maryam Khalili Far (3 goals)
- Best player: (Uzbekistan) Mekhrangiz Khamidova
- Fair play award: Kyrgyz Republic

The 2025 CAFA U-17 Women's Championship was the third edition of the CAFA U-17 Women's Championship, the biennial international women's youth football championship organised by Central Asian Football Association (CAFA) for the women's under-17 national teams of Central Asia. It took place in Dushanbe, Tajikistan, from March 4 to 8, 2025. A total of four teams, including host Tajikistan, took part in the tournament.

Uzbekistan were two-time defending champions having won the first two editions of the tournament. and successfully defended their title.

== Participating teams ==
Four of the six CAFA members entered the 2025 edition of the tournament, all of whom also took part in the previous edition.

Team	App	Last	Best placement in the tournament
Iran	3rd	2023	Runners-up (2021, 2023)
Kyrgyz Republic	2nd	2023	Third place (2023)
Tajikistan	3rd	2023	Third place (2021)
Uzbekistan	3rd	2023	Champions (2021, 2023)

Did not enter

- Afghanistan
- Turkmenistan

== Match officials ==
CAFA has selected the following referees and assistant referees for the tournament:

=== Referees ===
- (Iran) Fatemeh Nasiri
- (Kyrgyzstan) Malika Kadyarova
- (Tajikistan) Natalia Sotnikova
- (Uzbekistan) Gulshoda Saitkulova

=== Assistant Referees ===
- (Iran) Reihaneh Shirazi
- (Kyrgyzstan) Gaukhara Murzalieva
- (Tajikistan) Munisa Mirzoeva
- (Uzbekistan) Diana Isaeva

== Main tournament ==
Pos	Team	Pld	W	D	L	GF	GA	GD	Pts	Final result
1	Uzbekistan	3	2	1	0	2	0	+2	7	Champions
2	Iran	3	2	0	1	6	1	+5	6	Runners-up
3	Kyrgyz Republic	3	1	1	1	1	2	−1	4	Third place
4	Tajikistan (H)	3	0	0	3	0	6	−6	0	

Source: CAFA
Rules for classification: 1) Points; 2) head-to-head matches; 3) Goal difference; 4) Number of goals scored.
(H) Hosts
4 March 2025
12:00

Iran	0–1	Uzbekistan
		Alikhonova 62'

Republican Central Stadium, Dushanbe
Referee: Natalia Sotnikova (Tajikistan)
4 March 2025
15:00

Tajikistan	0–1	Kyrgyz Republic
		Makhamatsalieva 4'

Republican Central Stadium, Dushanbe
Referee: Fatemeh Nasiri (Iran)

6 March 2025
12:00

Kyrgyz Republic	0–2	Iran
		Soumehsaraei 38'; Khalili Far 64'

Republican Central Stadium, Dushanbe
Referee: Gulshoda Saitkulova (Uzbekistan)
6 March 2025
15:00

Uzbekistan	1–0	Tajikistan
Yusupova 45+1'

Republican Central Stadium, Dushanbe
Referee: Malika Kadyarova (Kyrgyzstan)

8 March 2025
12:00

Uzbekistan	0–0	Kyrgyz Republic

Republican Central Stadium, Dushanbe
Referee: Fatemeh Nasiri (Iran)
8 March 2025
15:00

Tajikistan	0–4	Iran
		Ghorbani 25'; Khalili Far 28', 38'; Lotfzadeh 88'

Republican Central Stadium, Dushanbe
Referee: Gulshoda Saitkulova (Uzbekistan)

== Goalscorers ==
There were 9 goals scored in 6 matches, for an average of 1.5 goals per match.

3 goals

- (Iran) Maryam Khalili Far

1 goal

- (Iran) Dina Ghorbani
- (Iran) Fatemeh Lotfzadeh
- (Iran) Yasna Soumehsaraei
- (Kyrgyzstan) Sumaiia Makhamatsalieva
- (Uzbekistan) Shakhzoda Alikhonova
- (Uzbekistan) Yodgorkhon Yusupova

Source: CAFA

== Player awards ==
The following awards were given at the conclusion of the tournament:

Top Goalscorer	Best player	Fair Play award	Special award
(Iran) Maryam Khalili Far (3 goals)	(Uzbekistan) Mekhrangiz Khamidova	Kyrgyz Republic	Tajikistan
