= 2019 CAFA U-16 Championship =

CAFA U-16 Championship 2019
Tournament details
- Host country: Tajikistan
- City: Dushanbe, Hisor
- Dates: 26 July - 1 August
- Teams: 6 (from 1 sub-confederation)
- Venue: 2 (in 2 host cities)

Final positions
- Champions: Tajikistan (1st title)
- Runners-up: Uzbekistan
- Third place: Iran
- Fourth place: Afghanistan

Tournament statistics
- Matches played: 15
- Goals scored: 42 (2.8 per match)
- Attendance: 5,741 (383 per match)
- Top scorer(s): (Afghanistan) Ahmad Zakaria Hussaini (Iran) Yadegar Rostami (Uzbekistan) Alisher Khayrullaev (3 goals each)
- Best player: (Tajikistan) Muhammadvoris Saidaliev
- Fair play award: Kyrgyzstan

the 2019 CAFA U-16 Championship was the 2nd edition of the CAFA U-16 Championship, the international youth football championship organized by Central Asian Football Association (CAFA) for the men's under-16 national teams of Central Asia. The tournament took place in the Tajik cities of Dushanbe and Hisor. with the participation of all CAFA members, with players born on or after 1 January 2003 eligible to participate.

Uzbekistan were the defending champions having won the inaugural edition in 2018. but failed to defend its title. Instead, the host nation Tajikistan clinched the title, marking their maiden triumph in any CAFA tournament.

== Participating teams ==
All six CAFA member nations participated in the tournament, setting a new record. Iran and Turkmenistan made their debut after missing the 2018 edition.

Team	App.	Previous best performance
Afghanistan	2nd	Runners-up (2018)
Iran	1st	Debut
Kyrgyzstan	2nd	Fourth place (2018)
Tajikistan	2nd	Third place (2018)
Turkmenistan	1st	Debut
Uzbekistan	2nd	Champions (2018)

== Venues ==
The tournament's matches took place in two venues spanning two cities.

Dushanbe	Hisor	2019 CAFA U-16 Championship (Tajikistan)
Republic Central Stadium	Hisor Central Stadium	2019 CAFA U-16 Championship (Tajikistan)
Capacity: 20,000	Capacity: 20,000	2019 CAFA U-16 Championship (Tajikistan)

== Match officials ==
The following referees and assistant referees were selected to officiate the tournament:

Referees

- (Afghanistan) Halim Aqa Shirzad
- (Iran) Komeil Gholami
- (Kyrgyzstan) Dairbek Abdyldaev
- (Tajikistan) Kurshed Dadoboev
- (Tajikistan) Sadullo Gulmurodi
- (Uzbekistan) Jasur Mukhtarov

Assistant referees

- (Afghanistan) Nangyali Sadat
- (Iran) Alireza Ildorom
- (Kyrgyzstan) Husan Dzhalaldinov
- (Tajikistan) Vafo Karaev
- (Tajikistan) Rustambek Khuzkhaev
- (Uzbekistan) Aleksandr Sidorov

== Main tournament ==
The final tournament schedule was announced on 16 July 2019.

Pos	Team	Pld	W	D	L	GF	GA	GD	Pts	Final result
1	Tajikistan (H)	5	4	1	0	10	1	+9	13	Champions
2	Uzbekistan	5	3	1	1	12	5	+7	10	Runners-up
3	Iran	5	3	0	2	10	6	+4	9	Third place
4	Afghanistan	5	2	1	2	4	6	−2	7	
5	Turkmenistan	5	1	0	4	2	11	−9	3	
6	Kyrgyzstan	5	0	1	4	4	13	−9	1	

Source: CAFA
(H) Hosts
26 July 2019
18:00

Turkmenistan	1–3	Iran
Goşaýew (yellow card) 17'; Sähedow 60'; Annamyradow (yellow card) 68'; Muhammetnurow (yellow card) 70+1'	Report (CAFA)	Golmohammadi 15'; Bahri (yellow card) 20'; Rostami 66' (pen.); Ranjbar 70+5'

Hisor Central Stadium, Hisor
Attendance: 100
Referee: Kurshed Dadoboev (Tajikistan)
26 July 2019
18:00

Afghanistan	2–2	Kyrgyzstan
Ebrahimi 44' (yellow card) 70+2'; Hussaini 51'	Report (CAFA)	Abylkasymov 17'; Daniiarov (yellow card) 19'; Azamatov 32'

Republic Central Stadium, Dushanbe
Attendance: 177
Referee: Jasur Mukhtarov (Uzbekistan)
26 July 2019
20:30

Uzbekistan	1–1	Tajikistan
Turdimurodov 28'; Khujamberdiev (yellow card) 43'; Todorov (yellow card) 70+2'	Report (CAFA)	Andalibov (yellow card) 6'; Salimshoev (yellow card) 41'; Alijoni 59'

Republic Central Stadium, Dushanbe
Attendance: 278
Referee: Dairbek Abdyldaev (Kyrgyzstan)

27 July 2019
18:00

Afghanistan	1–0	Turkmenistan
Hussaini 22' (yellow card) 33'; Zahidi (yellow card) 65'	Report (CAFA)	Jumaýew (yellow card) 62'; Sähedow (yellow card) 70+1'

Hisor Central Stadium, Hisor
Attendance: 37
Referee: Komeil Gholami (Iran)
27 July 2019
18:00

Tajikistan	2–0	Kyrgyzstan
Shovaisudinov 38'; Saidaliev 60' (pen.); Azizov (yellow card) 64'	Report (CAFA)

Republic Central Stadium, Dushanbe
Attendance: 123
Referee: Halim Aga Sh. (Afghanistan)
27 July 2019
20:30

Uzbekistan	1–2	Iran
Khujamberdiev 16' (pen.); Todorov (yellow card) 43'; Turdimurodov (yellow card) 50' (yellow-red card) 70+9'; Bakhodirov (yellow card) 68'	Report (CAFA)	Rohani 10'; Khademi 54'; Kamalvand (red card) 70+8'

Republic Central Stadium, Dushanbe
Attendance: 117
Referee: Gulmurodi Sadullo (Tajikistan)

29 July 2019
18:00

Kyrgyzstan	2–3	Uzbekistan
Ilichbek Uulu 41'; Tynybekov 46'; Azamatov (yellow card) 50'	Report (CAFA)	Toshkentboev 2'; Khujamberdiev 29' (pen.) (yellow card) 35+3'; Khayrullaev 39' (yellow card) 70+2'; Islamov (yellow card) 46'; Rakhmatov (yellow card) 55'

Hisor Central Stadium, Hisor
Attendance: 70
Referee: Komeil Gholarmi (Iran)
29 July 2019
18:00

Tajikistan	3–0	Turkmenistan
Shomurodov (yellow card) 5'; Azizov 59'; Saidaliev 67'; Toirov 70+4'	Report (CAFA)	Jumaýew (yellow card) 8'; Baýramow (yellow card) 54'; Kulyýazow (yellow card) 64'; Annamyradow (yellow card) 70+1'

Republic Central Stadium, Dushanbe
Attendance: 172
Referee: Halim Aqa Shirzad (Afghanistan)
29 July 2019
20:30

Iran	0–1	Afghanistan
Saghafi (yellow card) 70+5'; Koshki (yellow card) 70+5'	Report (CAFA)	Ibrahimi (yellow card) 25'; Hussaini 66'

Republic Central Stadium, Dushanbe
Attendance: 185
Referee: Dairbek Abdyldaev (Kyrgyzstan)

30 July 2019
18:00

Iran	0–3	Tajikistan
Golmohamadi (yellow card) 24'; Saghafi (yellow card) 35+2'	Report (CAFA)	Salimshoev 15', 27'; Shakhriyori (yellow card) 35+2'; Rahmadzoda (yellow card) 58'; Azizov 70+3'

Republic Central Stadium, Dushanbe
Attendance: 743
Referee: Jasur Mukhtarov (Uzbekistan)
30 July 2019
18:00

Afghanistan	0–3	Uzbekistan
Amiri (yellow card) 37'	Report (CAFA)	Khusanov 3' (yellow card) 49'; Khayrullaev 19'; Islamov (yellow card) 44'; Turdimurodov 48'; Muydinov (yellow card) 52'

Hisor Central Stadium, Hisor
Attendance: 57
Referee: Gulmurodi Sadullo (Tajikistan)
30 July 2019
20:30

Turkmenistan	1–0	Kyrgyzstan
Maksadow (yellow card) 5'; Kişikow 55'; Jumamyradow (yellow card) 60'	Report (CAFA)

Republic Central Stadium, Dushanbe
Attendance: 15
Referee: Kurshed Dadoboev (Tajikistan)

1 July 2019
18:00

Uzbekistan	4–0	Turkmenistan
Yulbarsov 3'; Tukhtasinov 12'; Akramov 46'; Khayrullaev 63'	Report (FFT)

Hisor Central Stadium, Hisor
Attendance: 117
Referee: Dairbek Abdyldaev (Kyrgyzstan)
1 July 2019
18:00

Tajikistan	1–0	Afghanistan
Khudoidodzoda 41'	Report (FFT)

Republic Central Stadium, Dushanbe
Attendance: 3,500
Referee: Komeil Gholami (Iran)
1 July 2019
20:30

Kyrgyzstan	0–5	Iran
	Report (FFT)	Rostami 14', 46'; Kamalvand 35+1'; Ranjbar 50'; Rohani 70'

Republic Central Stadium, Dushanbe
Attendance: 50
Referee: Halim Aqa Shirzad (Afghanistan)

== Goalscorers ==
There were 42 goals scored in 15 matches, for an average of 2.8 goals per match.

3 goals

- (Afghanistan) Ahmad Zakaria Hussaini
- (Iran) Yadegar Rostami
- (Uzbekistan) Alisher Khayrullaev

2 goals

- (Iran) Aliakbar Ranjbar
- (Iran) Khaled Rohani
- (Tajikistan) Kabir Salimshoev
- (Tajikistan) Muhammadvoris Saidaliev
- (Tajikistan) Sunatullo Azizov
- (Uzbekistan) Murodbek Khujamberdiev
- (Uzbekistan) Rustam Turdimurodov

1 goal

- (Afghanistan) Mehdi Ebrahimi
- (Iran) Sajad Khademi
- (Iran) Sajjad Golmohammadi
- (Iran) Sobhan Kamalvand
- (Kyrgyzstan) Aalambek Abylkasymov
- (Kyrgyzstan) Atai Ilichbek Uulu
- (Kyrgyzstan) Nurseit Azamatov
- (Kyrgyzstan) Yryskeldi Tynybekov
- (Tajikistan) Abdulfatoh Khudoidodzoda
- (Tajikistan) Aini Alijoni
- (Tajikistan) Khusrav Toirov
- (Tajikistan) Mujovid Shovaisudinov
- (Turkmenistan) Batyr Sähedow
- (Turkmenistan) Muhammetali Kişikow
- (Uzbekistan) Abdukodir Khusanov
- (Uzbekistan) Azizjon Toshkentboev
- (Uzbekistan) Elyor Yulbarsov
- (Uzbekistan) Shakhzod Akramov
- (Uzbekistan) Tokhirbek Tukhtasinov

Source: CAFA

== Awards ==
The following awards were given at the conclusion of the tournament:

Top Goalscorer	Best player	Fair Play award	Special award
(Afghanistan) Ahmad Zakaria Hussaini	(Tajikistan) Muhammadvoris Saidaliev	Kyrgyzstan	Turkmenistan
