= 2022 CAFA U-16 Championship =

Tournament details
- Host country: Tajikistan
- City: Dushanbe
- Dates: 11–21 May
- Teams: 5 (from 1 sub-confederation)
- Venue: 1 (in 1 host city)

Final positions
- Champions: Iran (1st title)
- Runners-up: Uzbekistan
- Third place: Tajikistan
- Fourth place: Afghanistan

Tournament statistics
- Matches played: 10
- Goals scored: 31 (3.1 per match)
- Attendance: 13,047 (1,305 per match)
- Top scorer(s): (Uzbekistan) Amirbek Saidov (6 goals)
- Best player: (Iran) Reza Ghandipour
- Fair play award: Kyrgyzstan

the 2022 CAFA U-16 Championship was the third edition of the CAFA U-16 Championship, the international youth football championship organized by Central Asian Football Association for the men's under-16 national teams of Central Asia. Tajikistan hosted the tournament from 11 to 21 May. A total of five teams competed for the title in the eight-day round-robin event, with all teams to cross paths once before the final Matchday on May 20, with players born on or after 1 January 2006 eligible to participate.

Tajikistan were the defending champions, having won the last edition in 2019. but failed to retain their title after winning only one of their four matches. Iran clinched the title after they edged out Uzbekistan on goal difference after a 7–0 win against Tajikistan.

== Participation ==
=== Participating teams ===
A total of 5 (out of 6) CAFA nations entered the competition.

Team	Appearance	Previous best performance
Afghanistan	3rd	Runners-up (2018)
Iran	2nd	Third place (2019)
Kyrgyzstan	3rd	Fourth place (2018)
Tajikistan	3rd	Champions (2019)
Uzbekistan	3rd	Champions (2018)

Did not enter

- Turkmenistan

== Venues ==
Matches were held at the Republic Central Stadium.

Dushanbe	2022 CAFA U-16 Championship (Tajikistan)
Republic Central Stadium	2022 CAFA U-16 Championship (Tajikistan)
Capacity: 20,000	2022 CAFA U-16 Championship (Tajikistan)

== Match officials ==
The following officials were appointed for the tournament:

Referees

- (Iran) Seyyedali Asghar Momeni
- (Kyrgyzstan) Nurzatbek Abdykadyrov
- (Tajikistan) Abdullo Dablatov
- (Uzbekistan) Akobirkhuja Shukurllaev

Assistant referees

- (Iran) Alireza Moradi
- (Kyrgyzstan) Khusan Dzhalaldinov
- (Tajikistan) Akmal Buriev
- (Tajikistan) Ismoil Nuraliev
- (Uzbekistan) Rustam Tagaev
- (Uzbekistan) Aleksandr Sidorov

== Main tournament ==
The main tournament schedule was announced on 6 May 2022.

Pos	Team	Pld	W	D	L	GF	GA	GD	Pts	Final result
1	Iran	4	3	1	0	12	2	+10	10	Champions
2	Uzbekistan	4	3	1	0	13	4	+9	10	Runners-up
3	Tajikistan (H)	4	1	1	2	2	9	−7	4	Third place
4	Afghanistan	4	0	2	2	1	8	−7	2	
5	Kyrgyzstan	4	0	1	3	3	8	−5	1	

Source: CAFA
Rules for classification: 1) Points; 2) head-to-head matches; 3) Goal difference; 4) Number of goals scored.
(H) Hosts
13 May 2022
18:00

Uzbekistan	2–2	Iran
Mukhtorov 41'; Saidov 88'	Report	Ghandipour 58'; Digehsara 62'

Republic Central Stadium, Dushanbe
Attendance: 420
Referee: Nurzatbek Abdykadyrov (Kyrgyzstan)
13 May 2022
21:00

Afghanistan	1–1	Kyrgyzstan
Niazi 57'	Report	Shaidullaev 68'

Republic Central Stadium, Dushanbe
Attendance: 545
Referee: Akobirkhuja Shukurllaev (Uzbekistan)

14 May 2022
18:00

Afghanistan	0–6	Uzbekistan
	Report	Djumatov 41', 53'; Khoshimboev 52'; Mirzaev 57'; Saidov 60', 83'

Republic Central Stadium, Dushanbe
Attendance: 444
Referee: Abdullo Davlatov (Tajikistan)
14 May 2022
21:00

Kyrgyzstan	0–2	Tajikistan
	Report	Gafurov 52' (pen.); Saidov 69'

Republic Central Stadium, Dushanbe
Attendance: 2,500
Referee: Seyyedali Asghar Momeni (Iran)

16 May 2022
18:00

Iran	2–0	Kyrgyzstan
Temirbekov 12' (o.g.); Taheri 74'	Report

Republic Central Stadium, Dushanbe
Attendance: 120
Referee: Akobirkhuja Shukurullaev (Uzbekistan)
16 May 2022
21:00

Tajikistan	0–0	Afghanistan
	Report

Republic Central Stadium, Dushanbe
Attendance: 5,005
Referee: Seyyedali Asghar Momeni (Iran)

18 May 2022
18:00

Iran	1–0	Afghanistan
Dizajvar 86'	Report

Republic Central Stadium, Dushanbe
Attendance: 424
Referee: Abdullo Davlatov (Tajikistan)
18 May 2022
21:00

Uzbekistan	2–0	Tajikistan
Shdiboev 13'; Djumatov 49'	Report

Republic Central Stadium, Dushanbe
Attendance: 3,000
Referee: Nurzatbek Abdykadyrov (Kyrgyzstan)

20 May 2022
18:00

Kyrgyzstan	2–3	Uzbekistan
Kuvatbekov 8' (pen.); Tursunaliev 21'	Report	Saidov 12', 24', 75'

Republic Central Stadium, Dushanbe
Attendance: 185
Referee: Seyyedali Asghar Momeni (Iran)
20 May 2022
21:00

Tajikistan	0–7	Iran
	Report	Ghandipour 16', 39', 48'; Askari 50'; Samian 65'; Taheri 83', 89'

Republic Central Stadium, Dushanbe
Attendance: 404
Referee: Nurzatbek Abdykadyrov (Kyrgyzstan)

== Player awards ==
The following awards were given at the conclusion of the tournament:

Top Goalscorer	Best player	Fair Play award	Special award
(Uzbekistan) Amirbek Saidov (6 goals)	(Iran) Reza Ghandipour	Kyrgyzstan	Afghanistan

== Goalscorers ==
There were 31 goals scored in 10 matches, for an average of 3.1 goals per match.

6 goals

- (Uzbekistan) Amirbek Saidov

4 goals

- (Iran) Reza Ghandipour

3 goals

- (Iran) Kasra Taheri
- (Uzbekistan) Bekhruz Djumatov

1 goal

- (Afghanistan) Hakim Khan Niazi
- (Iran) Mahan Sadeghi Digehsara
- (Iran) Amirreza Jeddi Dizajvar
- (Iran) Esmaeil Gholizadeh Samian
- (Iran) Mohammad Askari
- (Kyrgyzstan) Baiel Tursunaliev
- (Kyrgyzstan) Munarbek Kuvatbekov
- (Kyrgyzstan) Arzybek Shaidullaev
- (Tajikistan) Masrur Gafurov
- (Tajikistan) Sheravgan Saidov
- (Uzbekistan) Jahongir Khoshimboev
- (Uzbekistan) Lazizbek Mirzaev
- (Uzbekistan) Zikrillokhon Mukhtorov
- (Uzbekistan) Shodiyor Shodiboev

1 own goal

- (Kyrgyzstan) Emirkhan Temirbekov (against Iran)

Source: CAFA
