= Iran women's national under-17 football team =

National association football team

Iran
- Nickname: Team Melli Nojavanane Zanan
- Association: IFF
- Confederation: AFC (Asia)
- Sub-confederation: CAFA (Central Asia)
- Head coach: Shadi Mahini
- FIFA code: IRN
First colours	Second colours

Asian Cup
- Appearances: 2 (first in 2013)
- Best result: Group Stage (2013, 2015)

The Iran women's national under-17 football team represents Iran in international women's under-17 football in the AFC U-17 Women's Asian Cup and the FIFA U-17 Women's World Cup. It is controlled by the Iranian Football Federation. Iran women's national under-17 football team has qualified to AFC U-16 Women's Championship twice in 2011 and 2013.

== Fixtures and Results ==
Win Draw Loss

=== 2026 ===
5 October 2026 2027 Asian Cup qualification	Iran	–	Laos	Vientiane, Laos
19:00 UTC+7				Stadium: New Laos National Stadium

8 October 2026 2027 Asian Cup qualification	Cambodia	–	Iran	Vientiane, Laos
16:00 UTC+7				Stadium: New Laos National Stadium

11 October 2026 2027 Asian Cup qualification	Chinese Taipei	–	Iran	Vientiane, Laos
16:00 UTC+7				Stadium: New Laos National Stadium

== Competitive record ==
=== AFC U16/U17 Women's Championship ===
AFC U-17 Women's Asian Cup									Qualifications							
Year	Result	M	W	D	L	GF	GA	GD	M	W	D	L	GF	GA	GD	Link
(South Korea) 2005	did not enter								no qualifications							Link
(Malaysia) 2007	did not enter								no qualifications							Link
(Thailand) 2009	did not enter								did not enter							Link
(China) 2011	did not qualify								6	1	1	4	7	14	-7	Link
(China) 2013	Group stage	2	1	0	1	2	9	-7	3	2	0	1	8	5	+3	Link
(China) 2015	Group stage	3	0	0	3	0	13	-13	4	4	0	0	19	3	+16	Link
(Thailand) 2017	did not qualify								5	3	0	2	28	9	+19	Link
(Thailand) 2019	did not qualify								7	3	1	3	25	8	+17	Link
(Indonesia) 2024	did not qualify								5	2	0	3	8	18	-10	Link
(China) 2026	did not qualify								3	2	0	1	12	2	+10	Link
Total	2/9	5	1	0	4	2	22	-20	33	17	2	14	107	59	+48	Link

- 2022 AFC U-17 Women's Asian Cup was cancelled.

=== CAFA Youth Championship ===
==== U17 ====
- Runners-up: 2021 CAFA U-17 Women's Championship
- Runners-up: 2023 CAFA U-17 Women's Championship
- Runners-up: 2025 CAFA U-17 Women's Championship

==== U15 ====
- Runners-up: 2017 CAFA U-15 Girls Championship
- Champions: 2019 CAFA U-15 Girls Championship
- Runners-up: 2022 CAFA U-15 Girls Championship
- Champions: 2024 CAFA U-15 Girls Championship

==== U14 ====
- Champions: 2023 CAFA U-14 Girls Championship

== See also ==
- Iran women's national football team
- Iran women's national under-20 football team
- Women's football in Iran
