= 2024 CAFA U-15 Girls Championship =

International youth football competition

Чемпионат CAFA-2024 среди женских юниорских сборных (U-15)

Tournament details
- Host country: Tajikistan
- City: Dushanbe
- Dates: 21–25 May
- Teams: 4 (from 1 sub-confederation)
- Venue(s): 1 (in 1 host city)

Final positions
- Champions: Iran (2nd title)
- Runners-up: Uzbekistan
- Third place: Kyrgyz Republic

Tournament statistics
- Matches played: 6
- Goals scored: 18 (3 per match)
- Attendance: 325 (54 per match)
- Top scorer(s): (Iran) Maryam Khalili Far (5 goals)
- Best player(s): (Iran) Yasna Soumehsaraei
- Fair play award: Tajikistan

The 2024 CAFA U-15 Girls Championship was the fourth edition of the CAFA U-15 Girls Championship, the biennial international women's football youth championship of Central Asia organized by the Central Asian Football Association (CAFA) for the women's under-15 national teams of Central Asia. Tajikistan hosted the tournament from 21 to 25 May. A total of four teams played in the tournament, with players born on or after 1 January 2009 eligible to participate.

Uzbekistan were the defending champions having won the last edition. but failed to defend their title after losing to Iran in the second match. In the other hand Iran clinched their second title undefeated.

== Participating teams ==
Four (out of 6) CAFA nations entered the competition, with the Kyrgyz Republic returning to the tournament after missing the last edition in 2022.

Team	Appearance	Last appearance	Previous best performance
Iran	4th	2022 (Runners-up)	Champions (2019)
Kyrgyz Republic	3rd	2019 (Runners-up)	Runners-up (2019)
Tajikistan	4th	2022 (Third place)	Third place (2017, 2019, 2022)
Uzbekistan	4th	2022 (Champions)	Champions (2017, 2022)

Did not enter

- Afghanistan
- Turkmenistan

== Squads ==
Team	Squad	Head Coach
Iran	Squad	(Iran) Parvane Khosravi
Kyrgyz Republic	Squad	(Kyrgyzstan) Natalia Gayvoronskaya
Tajikistan	Squad	(Tajikistan) Farkhodjon Kholbekov
Uzbekistan	Squad	(Uzbekistan) Viktoriya Sirota

== Venues ==
All matches are scheduled to take place at a single venue located in the capital city Dushanbe.

Dushanbe	2024 CAFA U-15 Girls Championship (Tajikistan)
Republic Central Stadium	2024 CAFA U-15 Girls Championship (Tajikistan)
Capacity: 20,000	2024 CAFA U-15 Girls Championship (Tajikistan)

== Match officials ==
The following referees and assistant referees were selected to officiate the tournament:

Referees

- (Iran) Mahsa Ghorbani
- (Kyrgyzstan) Malika Kadyrova
- (Uzbekistan) Roziyabonu Yusupova
- (Uzbekistan) Gulshoda Saitkulova

Assistant referees

- (Iran) Bahareh Seyfi

== Main tournament ==
The main tournament schedule was announced on 11 May 2024.

Pos	Team	Pld	W	D	L	GF	GA	GD	Pts	Final result
1	Iran	3	3	0	0	10	1	+9	9	Champions
2	Uzbekistan	3	2	0	1	3	1	+2	6	Runners-up
3	Kyrgyz Republic	3	1	0	2	4	7	−3	3	Third place
4	Tajikistan (H)	3	0	0	3	1	9	−8	0	

Source: CAFA
Rules for classification: 1) Points; 2) head-to-head matches; 3) Goal difference; 4) Number of goals scored.
(H) Hosts
21 May 2024
17:00

Iran	5–1	Kyrgyz Republic
Khalili Far 12', 38', 43'; Soumehsaraei 55'; Forouzanfar 80+1'	Report	Makhamatsalieva 5'

Republic Central Stadium, Dushanbe
Attendance: 50
Referee: Roziyabonu Yusupova (Uzbekistan)
21 May 2024
20:00

Tajikistan	0–2	Uzbekistan
	Report	Akbarova 7'; M. Khamidova 68'

Republic Central Stadium, Dushanbe
Attendance: 60
Referee: Malika Kadyrova (Kyrgyz Republic)

23 May 2024
17:00

Uzbekistan	0–1	Iran
	Report	Ghorbani 32'

Republic Central Stadium, Dushanbe
Attendance: 20
Referee: Malika Kadyrova (Kyrgyz Republic)
23 May 2024
20:00

Kyrgyz Republic	3–1	Tajikistan
Asanbekova 26'; Makhamatsalieva 75'; Bakyt 80+1'	Report	Qodirova 31'

Republic Central Stadium, Dushanbe
Attendance: 45
Referee: Gulshoda Saitkulova (Uzbekistan)

25 May 2024
17:00

Kyrgyz Republic	0–1	Uzbekistan
	Report	Alikhonova 32'

Republic Central Stadium, Dushanbe
Attendance: 85
Referee: Natalia Sotnikova (Tajikistan)
25 May 2024
20:00

Tajikistan	0–4	Iran
	Report	Khalili Far 7', 29'; Soumehsaraei 59' (pen.); Davoudilimouni 72'

Republic Central Stadium, Dushanbe
Attendance: 65
Referee: Roziyabonu Yusupova (Uzbekistan)

== Goalscorers ==
There were 18 goals scored in 6 matches, for an average of 3 goals per match.

5 goals

- (Iran) Maryam Khalili Far

2 goals

- (Iran) Yasna Jafarina Soumehsaraei
- (Kyrgyzstan) Sumaiia Makhamatsalieva

1 goal

- (Iran) Sedna Davoudilimouni
- (Iran) Setia Forouzanfar
- (Iran) Tania Ghorbani
- (Kyrgyzstan) Anelia Asanbekova
- (Kyrgyzstan) Eles Bakyt
- (Tajikistan) Omina Qodirova
- (Uzbekistan) Mohina Akbarova
- (Uzbekistan) Mehrangiz Khamidova
- (Uzbekistan) Shakhzoda Alikhonova

Source: CAFA
