= CAFA Youth Championship =

The CAFA Youth Championship, is an international association football competition contested by the youth (U-14 to U-17) national teams of the members of the Central Asian Football Association (CAFA), the governing body of football in Central Asia.

== Results ==
=== Under-17 Boys ===
CAFA U-17 Championship
- Founded: 2023; 3 years ago
- Region: Central Asia (CAFA)
- Teams: 6 (as of 2024)
- Current champions: Tajikistan (2nd title)
- Most championships: Tajikistan (2 titles)
- 2025 CAFA U-17 Championship

The CAFA U-17 Championship is an international football competition contested by the Central Asian boys under-17 national teams of the CAFA member associations. The competition began in 2023, with Tajikistan winning the inaugural competition.

Edition	Year	Hosts	Champions	Score	Runners-up	Third place	Score	Fourth place	No. of Teams
1	2023	Tajikistan	Tajikistan	round-robin	Uzbekistan	Afghanistan	round-robin	Iran	5
2	2024	Tajikistan	Afghanistan	1–0	Uzbekistan	Tajikistan	1–1 (4–2 p)	Iran	6
3	2025	Uzbekistan	Tajikistan	4–3 (a.e.t.)	Uzbekistan	Turkmenistan	0–0 (7–6 p)	Kyrgyz Republic	6
4	2026	Uzbekistan	Tajikistan	round-robin	Uzbekistan	Kyrgyz Republic	round-robin	Turkmenistan	6

Teams reaching the top four
Team	Titles	Runners-up	Third place	Fourth place	Total
Tajikistan	2 (2023, 2025)		1 (2024)		3
Afghanistan	1 (2024)		1 (2023)		2
Uzbekistan		3 (2023, 2024, 2025)			3
Iran				2 (2023, 2024)	2
Turkmenistan			1 (2025)		1
Kyrgyzstan				1 (2025)	1

=== Under-16 Boys ===
CAFA U-16 Championship
- Founded: 2018; 8 years ago
- Region: Central Asia (CAFA)
- Teams: 5 (as of 2022)
- Current champions: Iran (1st title)
- Most championships: Iran; Tajikistan; Uzbekistan (1 title each)
- 2022 CAFA U-16 Championship

The CAFA U-16 Championship is an international football competition contested by the Central Asian boys under-16 national teams of the CAFA member associations. The competition began in 2018, with Uzbekistan winning the inaugural competition.

Edition	Year	Hosts	Champions	Score	Runners-up	Third place	Score	Fourth place	No. of Teams
1	2018	Uzbekistan	Uzbekistan	round-robin	Afghanistan	Tajikistan	round-robin	Kyrgyzstan	4
2	2019	Tajikistan	Tajikistan	round-robin	Uzbekistan	Iran	round-robin	Afghanistan	6
3	2022	Tajikistan	Iran	round-robin	Uzbekistan	Tajikistan	round-robin	Afghanistan	5

Teams reaching the top four
Team	Titles	Runners-up	Third place	Fourth place	Total
Uzbekistan	1 (2018)	2 (2019, 2022)			3
Tajikistan	1 (2019)		2 (2018, 2022)		3
Iran	1 (2022)		1 (2019)		2
Afghanistan		1 (2018)		2 (2019, 2022)	3
Kyrgyzstan				1 (2018)	1

=== Under-15 Boys ===
CAFA U-15 Championship
- Founded: 2017; 9 years ago
- Region: Central Asia (CAFA)
- Teams: 5 (as of 2021)
- Current champions: Iran (1st title)
- Most championships: Iran (2 titles)
- 2021 CAFA U-15 Championship

The CAFA U-15 Championship is an international football competition contested by the Central Asian boys under-15 national teams of the CAFA member associations. The competition began in 2017, with Afghanistan winning the inaugural competition.

Edition	Year	Hosts	Champions	Score	Runners-up	Third place	Score	Fourth place	No. of Teams
1	2017	Tajikistan	Afghanistan	round-robin	Uzbekistan	Turkmenistan	round-robin	Kyrgyzstan	5
2	2018	Uzbekistan	Iran	round-robin	Uzbekistan	Tajikistan	round-robin	Afghanistan	6
3	2021	Tajikistan	Iran	round-robin	Tajikistan	Uzbekistan	round-robin	Kyrgyzstan	5

Teams reaching the top four
Team	Titles	Runners-up	Third place	Fourth place	Total
Iran	2 (2018, 2021)				2
Afghanistan	1 (2017)			1 (2018)	2
Uzbekistan		2 (2017, 2018)	1 (2021)		3
Tajikistan		1 (2021)	1 (2018)		2
Turkmenistan			1 (2017)		1
Kyrgyzstan				2 (2017, 2021)	2

=== Under-14 Boys ===
CAFA U-14 Championship
- Founded: 2022; 4 years ago
- Region: Central Asia (CAFA)
- Teams: 5 (as of 2022)
- Current champions: Tajikistan (1st title)
- Most championships: Tajikistan (1 title)
- 2022 CAFA U-14 Championship

The CAFA U-14 Championship is an international football competition contested by the Central Asian boys under-14 national teams of the CAFA member associations. The competition began in 2022, with Tajikistan winning the inaugural competition.

Edition	Year	Hosts	Champions	Score	Runners-up	Third place	Score	Fourth place	No. of Teams
1	2022	Tajikistan	Tajikistan	round-robin	Iran	Uzbekistan	round-robin	Afghanistan	5

Teams reaching the top four
Team	Titles	Runners-up	Third place	Fourth place	Total
Tajikistan	1 (2022)				1
Iran		1 (2022)			1
Uzbekistan			1 (2022)		1
Afghanistan				1 (2022)	1

=== Under-17 Women ===
CAFA U-17 Women's Championship
- Founded: 2021; 5 years ago
- Region: Central Asia (CAFA)
- Teams: 4 (as of 2025)
- Current champions: Uzbekistan (3rd title)
- Most championships: Uzbekistan (3 titles)
- 2025 CAFA U-17 Women's Championship

The CAFA U-17 Women's Championship is an international football competition contested by the Central Asian women's under-17 national teams of the CAFA member associations. The competition began in 2021, with Uzbekistan winning the inaugural competition.

Edition	Year	Hosts	Champions	Score	Runners-up	Third place	Score and Venue	Fourth place	No. of Teams
1	2021	Tajikistan	Uzbekistan	round-robin	Iran	Tajikistan	round-robin	Afghanistan	4
2	2023	Tajikistan	Uzbekistan	round-robin	Iran	Kyrgyzstan	round-robin	Tajikistan	4
3	2025	Tajikistan	Uzbekistan	round-robin	Iran	Kyrgyzstan	round-robin	Tajikistan	4

Teams reaching the top four
Team	Titles	Runners-up	Third place	Fourth place	Total
Uzbekistan	3 (2021, 2023, 2025)				3
Iran		3 (2021, 2023, 2025)			3
Kyrgyzstan			2 (2023, 2025)		2
Tajikistan			1 (2021)	2 (2023, 2025)	3
Afghanistan				1 (2021)	1

=== Under-15 Girls ===
CAFA U-15 Girls Championship
- Founded: 2017; 9 years ago
- Region: Central Asia (CAFA)
- Teams: 4 (as of 2024)
- Current champions: Iran (2nd title)
- Most championships: Iran; Uzbekistan (2 titles)
- 2024 CAFA U-15 Girls Championship

The CAFA U-15 Girls Championship is an international football competition contested by the Central Asian girls under-15 national teams of the CAFA member associations. The competition began in 2017, with Uzbekistan winning the inaugural competition.

Edition	Year	Hosts	Champions	Score	Runners-up	Third place	Score	Fourth place	No. of Teams
1	2017	Tajikistan	Uzbekistan	round-robin	Iran	Tajikistan	round-robin	Kyrgyzstan	4
2	2019	Uzbekistan	Iran	round-robin	Kyrgyzstan	Tajikistan	round-robin	Uzbekistan	4
3	2022	Tajikistan	Uzbekistan	round-robin	Iran	Tajikistan			3
4	2024	Tajikistan	Iran	round-robin	Uzbekistan	Kyrgyzstan	round-robin	Tajikistan	4

Teams reaching the top four
Team	Titles	Runners-up	Third place	Fourth place	Total
Iran	2 (2019, 2024)	2 (2017, 2022)			4
Uzbekistan	2 (2017, 2022)	1 (2024)		1 (2019)	4
Kyrgyzstan		1 (2019)	1 (2024)	1 (2017)	3
Tajikistan			3 (2017, 2019, 2022)	1 (2024)	4

=== Under-14 Girls ===
CAFA U-14 Girls Championship
- Founded: 2023; 3 years ago
- Region: Central Asia (CAFA)
- Teams: 4 (as of 2023)
- Current champions: Iran (1st title)
- Most championships: Iran (1 title)
- 2023 CAFA U-14 Girls Championship

The CAFA U-14 Girls Championship is an international football competition contested by the Central Asian girls under-14 national teams of the CAFA member associations. The competition began in 2023, with Iran winning the inaugural competition.

Edition	Year	Hosts	Champions	Score	Runners-up	Third place	Score	Fourth place	No. of Teams
1	2023	Tajikistan	Iran	round-robin	Kyrgyzstan	Uzbekistan	round-robin	Tajikistan	4

Teams reaching the top four
Team	Titles	Runners-up	Third place	Fourth place	Total
Iran	1 (2022)				1
Kyrgyzstan		1 (2022)			1
Uzbekistan			1 (2022)		1
Tajikistan				1 (2022)	1

== Matches ==
=== Men ===
- 2017 U15:
- 2018 U16:
- 2018 U15:
- 2019 U16:

=== Women ===
- 2017 U15:
- 2019 U15:
- 2021 U17:
