= 2023 CAFA U-17 Women's Championship =

CAFA U-17 Women's Championship 2023
Чемпионат CAFA-2023 среди девушек до 17 лет

Tournament details
- Host country: Tajikistan
- City: Hisor
- Dates: 12–16 March
- Teams: 4 (from 1 sub-confederation)
- Venue: 1 (in 1 host city)

Final positions
- Champions: Uzbekistan (2nd title)
- Runners-up: Iran
- Third place: Kyrgyz Republic

Tournament statistics
- Matches played: 6
- Goals scored: 26 (4.33 per match)
- Attendance: 341 (57 per match)
- Top scorer(s): (Iran) Somayeh Esmaeili (Uzbekistan) Mehribon Egamberdieva (4 goals)
- Best player: (Uzbekistan) Asalkhon Aminjonova
- Fair play award: Iran

The 2023 CAFA U-17 Women's Championship was second edition of the CAFA U-17 Women's Championship, the biennial international women's youth football championship organised by Central Asian Football Association (CAFA) for the women's under-17 national teams of Central Asia. It took place in Hisor, Tajikistan. A total of four teams including host Tajikistan participated in the tournament, with Kyrgyz Republic debuting in the tournament.

Uzbekistan were the defending champions and they successfully defended their 2021 title after finishing at the top of the table unbeaten in all matches.

== Participating nations ==
On 6 March 2023, CAFA confirmed the participation of four member associations in the tournament. Kyrgyz Republic debuted in the tournament after withdrawing from the first edition before the start of the tournament. despite participating in the first edition Afghanistan missed out on this edition.

Team	App	Last	Best placement in the tournament
Iran	2nd	2021	Runners-up (2021)
Kyrgyz Republic	1st	—N/a	debut
Tajikistan	2nd	2021	Third place (2021)
Uzbekistan	2nd	2021	Champions (2021)

Did not enter

- Afghanistan
- Turkmenistan

== Match officials ==
CAFA has selected the following referees and assistant referees for the tournament:

=== Referees ===
- (Iran) Fatemeh Nasiri Looshani
- (Kyrgyzstan) Malika Kadyrova
- (Tajikistan) Natalia Sotnikova
- (Tajikistan) Zukhal Khuchanazarova

=== Assistant Referees ===
- (Iran) Zahra Emdadi Siahpirani
- (Kyrgyzstan) Adinai Kylychbek Kyzy
- (Tajikistan) Munisa Mirzoeva
- (Uzbekistan) Nasibabonu Toshmuhammedova

== Squads ==
Players born on or after 1 January 2006 were eligible to compete in the tournament. Each team had to register a squad of a minimum of 18 players and a maximum of 23 players.

== Main tournament ==
The official tournament schedule was revealed on 5 March 2023.

Pos	Team	Pld	W	D	L	GF	GA	GD	Pts	Final result
1	Uzbekistan	3	3	0	0	12	1	+11	9	Champions
2	Iran	3	2	0	1	10	4	+6	6	Runners-up
3	Kyrgyz Republic	3	1	0	2	4	5	−1	3	Third place
4	Tajikistan (H)	3	0	0	3	0	16	−16	0	

Source: CAFA
Rules for classification: 1) Points; 2) head-to-head matches; 3) Goal difference; 4) Number of goals scored.
(H) Hosts
12 March 2023
12:00

Uzbekistan	4–1	Iran
Egamberdieva 27', 87'; Aminjonova 72' (pen.); Rostami 76' (o.g.)	Report	Feizrahimi (yellow card) 24'; Babouyehdarabi (yellow card) 55'; Esmaeili 76'

Hisor Central Stadium, Hisor
Attendance: 50
Referee: Malika Kadyrova (Kyrgyz Republic)
12 March 2023
16:30

Tajikistan	0–4	Kyrgyz Republic
	Report	Kostiuk 29' (yellow card) 79'; Dzhuzubakhunova 64'; Kostiuk (yellow card) 76'; Mamatsulaimanova (yellow card) 80' (goal) 83', 90'

Hisor Central Stadium, Hisor
Attendance: 44
Referee: Fatemeh Nasiri Looshani (Iran)

14 March 2023
12:00

Kyrgyz Republic	0–3	Uzbekistan
Pirmatova (yellow card) 14'; Kostiuk (yellow card) 55' (yellow-red card) 90'; Gaparova (yellow card) 75'	Report	Aminjonova (yellow card) 42'; Shodieva 73'; Rakhmatullaeva 77'; Egamberdieva 80'

Hisor Central Stadium, Hisor
Attendance: 50
Referee: Natalia Sotnikova (Tajikistan)
14 March 2023
16:30

Iran	7–0	Tajikistan
Birang 28' (pen.); Esmaeili 37', 79', 90+1'; Dini 78', 90+3'; Shahmiri 90'	Report	Rahmatova (yellow card) 82'; Zokirova (yellow card) 90+3'

Hisor Central Stadium, Hisor
Attendance: 66
Referee: Malika Kadyrova (Kyrgyz Republic)

16 March 2023
12:00

Iran	2–0	Kyrgyz Republic
Babouyehdarabi 26', 44'; Feizrahimi (yellow card) 59'	Report	Ishembieva (yellow card) 65'

Hisor Central Stadium, Hisor
Attendance: 54
Referee: Natalia Sotnikova (Tajikistan)
16 March 2023
16:30

Tajikistan	0–5	Uzbekistan
Khalilova (yellow card) 55'; Ashurova (yellow card) 75'; Shanbieva (yellow card) (red card) 90+3'	Report	Bakhtiyarova 23', 48'; Aminjonova 51'; Egamberdieva 57' (red card) 90+3'; Tuhtaboeva 62'; Olimjonova (yellow card) 63'

Hisor Central Stadium, Hisor
Attendance: 77
Referee: Fatemeh Nasiri Looshani (Iran)

== Goalscorers ==
There were 26 goals scored in 6 matches, for an average of 4.33 goals per match.

4 goals

- (Iran) Somayeh Esmaeili
- (Uzbekistan) Mehribon Egamberdieva

2 goals

- (Iran) Maryam Dini
- (Iran) Mina Babouyehdarabi
- (Kyrgyzstan) Nuriia Mamatsulaimanova
- (Uzbekistan) Asalkhon Aminjonova
- (Uzbekistan) Diyora Bakhtiyarova

1 goal

- (Iran) Maedeh Birang Kivaj
- (Iran) Shadan Shahmiri
- (Kyrgyzstan) Kristina Kostiuk
- (Kyrgyzstan) Myrzaiym Dzhuzubakhunova
- (Uzbekistan) Etibor Shodieva
- (Uzbekistan) Meruert Rakhmatullaeva
- (Uzbekistan) Navbahor Tuhtaboeva

1 own goal

- (Iran) Mahdis Rostami (against Uzbekistan)

Source: CAFA

== Player awards ==
The following awards were given at the conclusion of the tournament:
The ranking for the Top Goalscorer was determined using the following criteria: goals, assists and fewest minutes played.

Top Goalscorer	Best player	Fair Play award	Special award
(Iran) Somayeh Esmaeili (4 goals)	(Uzbekistan) Asalkhon Aminjonova	Iran	Tajikistan
