= 2022 CAFA U-15 Girls Championship =

International youth football competition

2022 CAFA U-15 Women's Championship

Tournament details
- Host country: Tajikistan
- City: Hisor
- Dates: 21–26 October 2022
- Teams: 3 (from 1 sub-confederation)
- Venue: 1 (in 1 host city)

Final positions
- Champions: Uzbekistan (2nd title)
- Runners-up: Iran

Tournament statistics
- Matches played: 3
- Goals scored: 11 (3.67 per match)
- Attendance: 251 (84 per match)
- Top scorer(s): (Uzbekistan) Mehribon Egamberdieva (4 goals)
- Best player: (Uzbekistan) Asalkhon Aminjonova
- Fair play award: Tajikistan

The 2022 CAFA U-15 Girls Championship was the third edition of the CAFA U-15 Girls Championship, the international women's football youth championship of Central Asia organized by the Central Asian Football Association (CAFA) for the women's under-15 national teams of Central Asia. It was held in Tajikistan from 21 to 26 October 2022. A total of 3 teams participated in the tournament, with players born on or after 1 January 2007 eligible to participate.

Iran were the defending champions having won the last edition. but were dethroned by Uzbekistan after they finished top of the standings on superior goal difference.

== Teams ==
A total of 3 (out of 6) CAFA nations entered the tournament.

Country	Appearance	Previous best performance
Iran	3rd	Champions (2019)
Tajikistan	3rd	Third place (2017, 2019)
Uzbekistan	3rd	Champions (2017)

Did not enter

- Afghanistan
- Kyrgyzstan
- Turkmenistan

== Venues ==
All matches were held at the following venue:

Hisor	2022 CAFA U-15 Girls Championship (Tajikistan)
Hisor Central Stadium	2022 CAFA U-15 Girls Championship (Tajikistan)
Capacity: 20,000	2022 CAFA U-15 Girls Championship (Tajikistan)

== Main tournament ==
The main tournament schedule was announced on 18 October 2022.

Pos	Team	Pld	W	D	L	GF	GA	GD	Pts	Final result
1	Uzbekistan	2	1	1	0	8	2	+6	4	Champions
2	Iran	2	1	1	0	3	2	+1	4	Runners-up
3	Tajikistan (H)	2	0	0	2	0	7	−7	0	

Source: CAFA
Rules for classification: 1) Points; 2) head-to-head matches; 3) Goal difference; 4) Number of goals scored.
(H) Hosts
21 October 2022
16:00 UTC+5

Uzbekistan	6–0	Tajikistan
Egamberdieva 7', 9', 55'; Aminjonova 20', 77'; Mamatkulova 40+1'	Report (UFA); Report (CAFA)

Hisor Central Stadium, Hisor
Attendance: 85
Referee: Bahareh Seifinahavandi (Iran)

23 October 2022
16:00 UTC+5

Iran	2–2	Uzbekistan
Rahmani 69', 73'	Report (UFA); Report (CAFA)	Egamberdieva 28'; Bakhtiyorova 35'

Hisor Central Stadium, Hisor
Attendance: 66
Referee: Zukhal Khuchanazarova (Tajikistan)

25 October 2022
16:00 UTC+5

Tajikistan	0–1	Iran
	Report (FFT); Report (CAFA)	Jahanshahi 44'

Hisor Central Stadium, Hisor
Attendance: 100
Referee: Roziyabonu Yusupova (Uzbekistan)

== Awards ==
=== Champion ===
2022 CAFA U-15 Girls Championship winners

Uzbekistan
Second title

=== Player awards ===
The following awards were given at the conclusion of the tournament.

Most Valuable Player	Top Scorer	Fairplay Award	Special Award
(Uzbekistan) Asalkhon Aminjonova	(Uzbekistan) Mehribon Egamberdieva (4 goals)	Tajikistan	Iran

== Goalscorers ==
There were 11 goals scored in 3 matches, for an average of 3.67 goals per match.

4 goals

- (Uzbekistan) Mehribon Egamberdieva

2 goals

- (Iran) Parnia Rahmani
- (Uzbekistan) Asalkhan Aminjonova

1 goal

- (Iran) Tania Jahanshahi
- (Uzbekistan) Dilnura Mamatkulova
- (Uzbekistan) Diyora Bakhtiyorova

Source: CAFA
