= Mohaddeseh Zolfi =

Iranian association football player (born 2005)

Personal information
- Full name: Mohaddeseh Zolfi
- Date of birth: January 16, 2005 (age 21)
- Place of birth: Tabriz, Iran
- Height: 1.68 m (5 ft 6 in)
- Position: Forward

Team information
- Current team: Ista Alborz
- Number: 6

Senior career*
Years	Team	Apps	(Gls)
2022–2023	Malavan Bandar Anzali		
2024–present	Ista Alborz		

International career^{‡}
2019	Iran U15		
2020–2021	Iran U17		(2)
2022–present	Iran women's national football team	5+	(1)
- * Club domestic league appearances and goals as of 9 June 2026 ‡ National team caps and goals as of 9 June 2026

Mohaddeseh Zolfi (born 16 January 2005 in Tabriz) is an Iranian footballer who plays as a forward for Ista Alborz and the Iran women's national football team.

== Playing career ==
She won the title with the Iran women's national under-15 team at the 2019 CAFA U-15 Girls Championship and was named the tournament's best player.

In 2021, she also performed successfully at the 2021 CAFA U-17 Women's Championship, where she was once again named the tournament's best player. The Iran women's national under-17 team finished as runners-up in the competition.

== Controversies ==
In 2026, following the Iran women's national team's participation in Australia, several international media outlets reported that a number of Iranian women's national team players had sought asylum. Mohaddeseh Zolfi was among the players mentioned in those reports.

Following the publication of these reports, several Iranian media outlets stated that she had returned to the Iran women's national team camp.

== International career ==
After progressing through Iran's youth national teams, Zolfi was called up to the senior Iran women's national football team and appeared in various international competitions, including the AFC Women's Asian Cup qualifiers, CAFA competitions, and official AFC tournaments.

During the qualification stage of the 2026 AFC Women's Asian Cup, she scored in Iran's match against Bhutan.

Zolfi also played for Iran in the final tournament of the 2026 AFC Women's Asian Cup against Australia, the Philippines, and South Korea.

== Honours ==
=== International ===
- Winner of the 2019 CAFA U-15 Girls Championship
- Runner-up of the 2021 CAFA U-17 Women's Championship

=== Individual ===
- Best Player of the 2019 CAFA U-15 Girls Championship
- Best Player of the 2021 CAFA U-17 Women's Championship
