= 2018 CAFA U-15 Championship =

Tournament details
- Host country: Uzbekistan
- City: Tashkent
- Dates: 20–31 July
- Teams: 6 (from 1 sub-confederation)
- Venue(s): 3 (in 1 host city)

Final positions
- Champions: Iran (1st title)
- Runners-up: Uzbekistan
- Third place: Tajikistan
- Fourth place: Afghanistan

Tournament statistics
- Matches played: 15
- Goals scored: 39 (2.6 per match)
- Attendance: 1,714 (114 per match)
- Top scorer(s): (Iran) Mehran Nafari (Uzbekistan) Oblayorbek Rahmatov (4 goals each)
- Best player(s): (Iran) Mehran Nafari
- Best goalkeeper: (Iran) Aria Hoseinifar
- Fair play award: Kyrgyzstan

The 2018 CAFA U-15 Championship was the second edition of the CAFA U-15 Championship, the international youth football championship organized by CAFA for the men's under-15 national teams of Central Asia. Uzbekistan was hosting the tournament. All 6 CAFA teams entered the tournament, with players born on or after 1 January 2003 eligible to participate.

Afghanistan were the defending champions having inaugural competition in 2017. but failed to retain their title after suffering two losses to Tajikistan and debutant Iran, who ultimately won the trophy unbeaten.

== Participating teams ==
All 6 CAFA nations entered the competition, with Iran making their debut after missing last year's edition.

Team	App.	Previous best performance
Afghanistan	2nd	Champions (2017)
Iran	1st	Debut
Kyrgyzstan	2nd	Fourth place (2017)
Tajikistan	2nd	Fifth place (2017)
Turkmenistan	2nd	Third place (2017)
Uzbekistan	2nd	Runners-up (2017)

== Venues ==
The tournaments matches were held at three venues located throughout the capital city Tashkent.

Tashkent			2018 CAFA U-15 Championship (Uzbekistan)
Lokomotiv Stadium	National Stadium	Pakhtakor Stadium	2018 CAFA U-15 Championship (Uzbekistan)
Capacity: 8,000	Capacity: 33,834	Capacity: 35,000	2018 CAFA U-15 Championship (Uzbekistan)

== Main tournament ==
The final tournament schedule was announced on 14 July 2018.

Pos	Team	Pld	W	D	L	GF	GA	GD	Pts	Final result
1	Iran	5	5	0	0	12	0	+12	15	Champions
2	Uzbekistan (H)	5	3	1	1	9	2	+7	10	Runners-up
3	Tajikistan	5	3	0	2	7	6	+1	9	Third place
4	Afghanistan	5	2	1	2	5	5	0	7	
5	Kyrgyzstan	5	1	0	4	5	8	−3	3	
6	Turkmenistan	5	0	0	5	1	18	−17	0	

Updated to match(es) played on unknown. Source: CAFA
(H) Hosts
22 July 2018
18:30

Turkmenistan	1–4	Uzbekistan
Maksadow 70+2'	Report	Kokhorjonov 8'; Akramov 49'; Rahmatov 54', 64'

National Stadium, Tashkent
Attendance: 123
Referee: Amir Saman Soltani (Iran)
22 July 2018
21:00

Kyrgyzstan	0–2	Iran
	Report	Nafari 34'; Afkhamkojaabadi 40'

National Stadium, Tashkent
Attendance: 54
Referee: Dzhumamurad Dzhumamuradov (Turkmenistan)
22 July 2018
21:00

Afghanistan	0–3	Tajikistan
	Report	Irgashev 10' (pen.); Mehruboni 22', 45'

Stadium of the Transport Institute, Tashkent
Attendance: 75
Referee: Asker Najafaliev (Uzbekistan)

24 July 2018
18:30

Uzbekistan	3–0	Tajikistan
Akramov 16', 26'; Khudzhamberdiev 61'	Report

Pakhtakor Stadium, Tashkent
Attendance: 248
Referee: Halim Aqa Sherzad (Afghanistan)
24 July 2018
21:00

Afghanistan	2–1	Kyrgyzstan
Barati 27'; Hussaini 35+1'	Report	Sharshenbekov 56'

Pakhtakor Stadium, Tashkent
Attendance: 248
Referee: Abdullo Davlatov (Tajikistan)
24 July 2018
21:00

Turkmenistan	0–5	Iran
	Report	Nafari 3', 24'; Karimi 22', 29', 61'

Stadium of the Transport Institute, Tashkent
Attendance: 63
Referee: Kiyomiddin Piriev (Kyrgyzstan)

26 July 2018
18:30

Tajikistan	2–0	Turkmenistan
Olimzoda 48'; Mehruboni 64'	Report

National Stadium, Tashkent
Attendance: 73
Referee: Kiyomiddin Piriev (Kyrgyzstan)
26 July 2018
21:00

Iran	1–0	Afghanistan
Mohammadi 14'	Report

National Stadium, Tashkent
Attendance: 67
Referee: Asker Najafaliev (Uzbekistan)
26 July 2018
21:00

Uzbekistan	2–0	Kyrgyzstan
Rahmatov 41', 52'	Report

Stadium of the Transport Institute, Tashkent
Attendance: 140
Referee: Dzhumamurad Dzhumamuradov (Turkmenistan)

28 July 2018
18:30

Kyrgyzstan	0–2	Tajikistan
	Report	Saidov 23'; Akramov 31'

National Stadium, Tashkent
Attendance: 100
Referee: Asker Najafaliev (Uzbekistan)
28 July 2018
21:00

Iran	1–0	Uzbekistan
Rostami 33'	Report

National Stadium, Tashkent
Attendance: 473
Referee: Halim Aqa Sherzad (Afghanistan)
28 July 2018
21:00

Afghanistan	3–0	Turkmenistan
Hussaini 56', 58'; Amiri 63'	Report

National Stadium, Tashkent
Attendance: 50
Referee: Abdullo Davlatov (Tajikistan)

30 July 2018
18:30

Tajikistan	0–3	Iran
	Report	Nafari 31'; Asgharikebria 63', 67'

Stadium of the Transport Institute, Tashkent
Referee: Kiyomiddin Piriev (Kyrgyzstan)
30 July 2018
21:00

Uzbekistan	0–0	Afghanistan

National Stadium, Tashkent
30 July 2018
21:00

Turkmenistan	0–4	Kyrgyzstan
	Report	Ilichbek Uulu ??', ??'; Tynybekov ??'; Beishebai Uulu ??'

Stadium of the Transport Institute, Tashkent

== Goalscorers ==
There were 39 goals scored in 15 matches, for an average of 2.6 goals per match.

4 goals

- (Iran) Mehran Nafari
- (Uzbekistan) Oblayorbek Rahmatov

3 goals

- (Afghanistan) Ahmad Zakaria Hussaini
- (Iran) Arshia Karimi
- (Tajikistan) Abdurauf Mehruboni
- (Uzbekistan) Shakhzod Akramov

2 goals

- (Iran) Arif Asgharikebria
- (Kyrgyzstan) Atai Ilichbek Uulu

1 goal

- (Afghanistan) Mohammad Sadiq Barati
- (Afghanistan) Ramin Amiri
- (Iran) Alireza Afkhamkojaabadi
- (Iran) Mohammadmehdi Mohammadi
- (Iran) Yadegar Rostami
- (Kyrgyzstan) Arsen Sharshenbekov
- (Kyrgyzstan) Yryskeldi Tynybekov
- (Kyrgyzstan) Beikunt Beishebai Uulu
- (Tajikistan) Salokhiddin Irgashev
- (Tajikistan) Firdavsi Olimzoda
- (Tajikistan) Muib Saidov
- (Tajikistan) Davlatbek Akramov
- (Turkmenistan) Begenç Maksadow
- (Uzbekistan) Murodbek Khudzhamberdiev
- (Uzbekistan) Asadbek Kokhorjonov

Source: CAFA

== Awards ==
The following awards were given at the conclusion of the tournament:

Top Goalscorer	Best player	Best goalkeeper
(Uzbekistan) Oblayorbek Rahmatov	(Iran) Mehran Nafari	(Iran) Aria Hoseinifar
Fair Play award	Special award	Fans award
Kyrgyzstan	Turkmenistan	Afghanistan
