= 2015 AFC U-16 Women's Championship =

2015亚足联U16女子锦标赛

Tournament details
- Host country: China
- Dates: 4–15 November
- Teams: 8 (from 1 confederation)
- Venue: 2 (in 1 host city)

Final positions
- Champions: North Korea (2nd title)
- Runners-up: Japan
- Third place: China
- Fourth place: Thailand

Tournament statistics
- Matches played: 16
- Goals scored: 69 (4.31 per match)
- Attendance: 1,755 (110 per match)
- Top scorer: (China) Wang Yanwen (6 goals)
- Best player: (North Korea) Ri Hae-yon
- Fair play award: Japan

The 2015 AFC U-16 Women's Championship was the 6th edition of the AFC U-16 Women's Championship, the biennial international youth football championship organised by the Asian Football Confederation (AFC) for the women's under-16 national teams of Asia. The tournament was held in China between 4–15 November 2015. A total of eight teams played in the tournament.

Same as previous editions, the tournament acted as the AFC qualifiers for the FIFA U-17 Women's World Cup. The top two teams of the tournament qualified for the 2016 FIFA U-17 Women's World Cup in Jordan as the AFC representatives, besides Jordan who qualified automatically as hosts.

North Korea won their second title with a 1–0 final victory over Japan. Both finalists qualified for the World Cup.

== Qualification ==
The draw for the qualifiers was held on 17 June 2014. Four teams qualified directly for the final tournament by their 2013 performance, while the other entrants competed in the qualifying stage for the remaining four spots.

=== Qualified teams ===
The following eight teams qualified for the final tournament.

| Team | Qualified as | Appearance | Previous best performance |
|---|---|---|---|
| Japan | 2013 AFC U-16 Women's Championship champions | 6th | Champions (2005, 2011, 2013) |
| North Korea | 2013 AFC U-16 Women's Championship runners-up | 5th | Champions (2007) |
| China | 2013 AFC U-16 Women's Championship third place / Hosts | 6th | Runners-up (2005) |
| Thailand | 2013 AFC U-16 Women's Championship fourth place | 6th | Third place (2005) |
| Uzbekistan | Qualifying Group A winners | 2nd | Group stage (2013) |
| Iran | Qualifying Group B winners | 2nd | Group stage (2013) |
| South Korea | Qualifying Group C winners | 6th | Champions (2009) |
| Chinese Taipei | Qualifying Group D winners | 4th | Group stage (2005, 2009, 2013) |

== Venues ==
Wuhan hosted the tournament, with two venues: Xinhua Road Sports Center and Hankou Cultural Sports Centre.

Wuhan
| Xinhua Road Sports Center | Hankou Cultural Sports Centre |
| Capacity: 22,140 | Capacity: 20,000 |
2015 AFC U-16 Women's Championship is located in China

== Draw ==
The draw for the final tournament was held on 13 May 2015 at the AFC House in Kuala Lumpur. The eight teams were drawn into two groups of four teams. The teams were seeded according to their performance in the previous edition in 2013.

| Pot 1 | Pot 2 | Pot 3 | Pot 4 |
|---|---|---|---|
| China (hosts); Japan | North Korea; Thailand | Chinese Taipei; Iran | South Korea; Uzbekistan |

== Squads ==
Players born between 1 January 1999 and 31 December 2001 were eligible to compete in the tournament. Each team can register a maximum of 23 players (minimum three of whom must be goalkeepers).

== Group stage ==
The top two teams of each group advanced to the semi-finals.

Tiebreakers

The teams were ranked according to points (3 points for a win, 1 point for a draw, 0 points for a loss). If tied on points, tiebreakers were applied in the following order:

1. Greater number of points obtained in the group matches between the teams concerned;
2. Goal difference resulting from the group matches between the teams concerned;
3. Greater number of goals scored in the group matches between the teams concerned;
4. Goal difference in all the group matches;
5. Greater number of goals scored in all the group matches;
6. Penalty shoot-out if only two teams are involved and they are both on the field of play;
7. Fewer score calculated according to the number of yellow and red cards received in the group matches (1 point for a single yellow card, 3 points for a red card as a consequence of two yellow cards, 3 points for a direct red card, 4 points for a yellow card followed by a direct red card);
8. Drawing of lots.

All times were local, CST (UTC+8).

=== Group A ===
| Pos | Team | Pld | W | D | L | GF | GA | GD | Pts | Qualification |
|---|---|---|---|---|---|---|---|---|---|---|
| 1 | China (H) | 3 | 2 | 1 | 0 | 12 | 3 | +9 | 7 | Knockout stage |
| 2 | Thailand | 3 | 2 | 0 | 1 | 5 | 5 | 0 | 6 | Knockout stage |
| 3 | South Korea | 3 | 1 | 1 | 1 | 8 | 4 | +4 | 4 | |
| 4 | Iran | 3 | 0 | 0 | 3 | 0 | 13 | −13 | 0 | |

Source: AFC
Rules for classification: Group stage tiebreakers
(H) Hosts
4 November 2015
15:00

| Thailand | 4–0 | Iran |
|---|---|---|
| Kanyanat 5', 36'; Yaowaporn 8', 90+2' | Report |

Hankou Cultural Sports Centre, Wuhan
Attendance: 60
Referee: Fusako Kajiyama (Japan)
4 November 2015
19:00

| China | 3–3 | South Korea |
|---|---|---|
| Xie Qiwen 16'; Zhang Linyan 38'; Wang Yanwen 72' | Report | Choi Jeong-min 57'; Gwon Hui-seon 68'; Mun Eun-ju 90+4' |

Xinhua Road Sports Center, Wuhan
Attendance: 200
Referee: Casey Reibelt (Australia)

6 November 2015
15:00

| South Korea | 0–1 | Thailand |
|---|---|---|
| | Report | Nutwadee 89' |

Hankou Cultural Sports Centre, Wuhan
Attendance: 105
Referee: Mai Hoàng Trang (Vietnam)
6 November 2015
19:00

| Iran | 0–4 | China |
|---|---|---|
| | Report | Ma Xiaolan 22', 90+3'; Chen Yuanmeng 27'; Wang Yanwen 81' |

Xinhua Road Sports Center, Wuhan
Attendance: 150
Referee: Thein Thein Aye (Myanmar)

8 November 2015
15:00

| China | 5–0 | Thailand |
|---|---|---|
| Ma Xiaolan 3'; Wang Yanwen 11', 33'; Jin Kun 40', 47' | Report |

Xinhua Road Sports Center, Wuhan
Attendance: 200
Referee: Thein Thein Aye (Myanmar)
8 November 2015
15:00

| Iran | 0–5 | South Korea |
|---|---|---|
| | Report | Choi Jeong-min 14', 30'; Jung Min-young 25' (pen.); Mun Eun-ju 53'; Yang Hyeon-ji 90+4' (pen.) |

Hankou Cultural Sports Centre, Wuhan
Attendance: 40
Referee: Casey Reibelt (Australia)

=== Group B ===
| Pos | Team | Pld | W | D | L | GF | GA | GD | Pts | Qualification |
|---|---|---|---|---|---|---|---|---|---|---|
| 1 | Japan | 3 | 2 | 1 | 0 | 11 | 1 | +10 | 7 | Knockout stage |
| 2 | North Korea | 3 | 2 | 1 | 0 | 10 | 1 | +9 | 7 | Knockout stage |
| 3 | Uzbekistan | 3 | 1 | 0 | 2 | 3 | 8 | −5 | 3 | |
| 4 | Chinese Taipei | 3 | 0 | 0 | 3 | 0 | 14 | −14 | 0 | |

Source: AFC
Rules for classification: Group stage tiebreakers
5 November 2015
15:00

| Japan | 4–0 | Uzbekistan |
|---|---|---|
| Nagano 54'; Ueki 60'; Miyazawa 78'; Takarada 81' | Report |

Xinhua Road Sports Center, Wuhan
Attendance: 50
Referee: Shiva Yari (Iran)
5 November 2015
15:00

| North Korea | 5–0 | Chinese Taipei |
|---|---|---|
| Kim Pom-ui 2'; Sung Hyang-sim 8', 33'; Ri Hae-yon 43'; Ri Un-jong 90+3' | Report |

Hankou Cultural Sports Centre, Wuhan
Attendance: 40
Referee: Pannipar Kamnueng (Thailand)

7 November 2015
15:00

| Uzbekistan | 0–4 | North Korea |
|---|---|---|
| | Report | Kim Pom-ui 45+3', 55', 78'; Choe Un-chong 71' |

Hankou Cultural Sports Centre, Wuhan
Attendance: 40
Referee: Shiva Yari (Iran)
7 November 2015
15:00

| Chinese Taipei | 0–6 | Japan |
|---|---|---|
| | Report | Endo 18'; Kanekatsu 24' (pen.); Miyazawa 31', 38'; Takahashi 40'; Kojima 88' |

Xinhua Road Sports Center, Wuhan
Attendance: 50
Referee: Park Ji-yeong (South Korea)

9 November 2015
15:00

| Japan | 1–1 | North Korea |
|---|---|---|
| Takahashi 63' | Report | Sung Hyang-sim 2' |

Xinhua Road Sports Center, Wuhan
Attendance: 100
Referee: Mai Hoàng Trang (Vietnam)
9 November 2015
15:00

| Chinese Taipei | 0–3 | Uzbekistan |
|---|---|---|
| | Report | Panjieva 45+1'; Kurbonova 75'; Nazarkulova 88' |

Hankou Cultural Sports Centre, Wuhan
Attendance: 35
Referee: Pannipar Kamnueng (Thailand)

== Knockout stage ==
In the knockout stage, penalty shoot-out was used to decide the winner if necessary (extra time was not used).

=== Bracket ===
Semi-finals
12 November – Wuhan
China | 1
North Korea | 2
12 November – Wuhan
Japan | 8
Thailand | 0

Final
15 November – Wuhan
North Korea | 1
Japan | 0
Third place
15 November – Wuhan
China | 8
Thailand | 0

=== Semi-finals ===
Winners qualified for 2016 FIFA U-17 Women's World Cup.

12 November 2015
15:00

| Japan | 8–0 | Thailand |
|---|---|---|
| Ueki 5', 68'; Takahashi 16'; Endo 36', 75'; Miyazawa 55', 56'; Takarada 84' | Report |

Xinhua Road Sports Center, Wuhan
Attendance: 100
Referee: Thein Thein Aye (Myanmar)

12 November 2015
19:00

| China | 1–2 | North Korea |
|---|---|---|
| Zhang Linyan 62' | Report | Ri Hae-yon 2', 87' |

Xinhua Road Sports Center, Wuhan
Attendance: 280
Referee: Casey Reibelt (Australia)

=== Third place match ===
15 November 2015
15:00

| China | 8–0 | Thailand |
|---|---|---|
| Zhao Yujie 14'; Wang Yanwen 19', 89' (pen.); Xie Qiwen 21', 26', 66'; Jin Kun 32'; Shen Mengyu 90+1' | Report |

Xinhua Road Sports Center, Wuhan
Attendance: 100
Referee: Fusako Kajiyama (Japan)

=== Final ===
15 November 2015
19:00

| North Korea | 1–0 | Japan |
|---|---|---|
| Ri Hae-yon 41' | Report |

Xinhua Road Sports Center, Wuhan
Attendance: 205
Referee: Pannipar Kamnueng (Thailand)

== Winners ==
Winner 2015 AFC U-16 Women's Championship

North Korea
Second title

== Qualified teams for FIFA U-17 Women's World Cup ==
The following three teams from AFC qualified for the FIFA U-17 Women's World Cup. Jordan qualified as hosts.

| Team | Qualified on | Previous appearances in tournament^{1} |
|---|---|---|
| Jordan | 5 December 2013 | 0 (Debut) |
| North Korea | 12 November 2015 | 4 (**2008**, 2010, 2012, 2014) |
| Japan | 12 November 2015 | 4 (2008, 2010, 2012, **2014**) |

^{1} Bold indicates champion for that year. Italic indicates host for that year.

== Awards ==
The following awards were given at the conclusion of the tournament.

| Most Valuable Player | Top Scorer | Fair Play Award |
|---|---|---|
| (North Korea) Ri Hae-yon | (China) Wang Yanwen | Japan |

== Goalscorers ==
6 goals

- (China) Wang Yanwen

5 goals

- (Japan) Hinata Miyazawa

4 goals

- (China) Xie Qiwen
- (North Korea) Kim Pom-ui
- (North Korea) Ri Hae-yon

3 goals

- (China) Jin Kun
- (China) Ma Xiaolan
- (Japan) Jun Endo
- (Japan) Hana Takahashi
- (Japan) Riko Ueki
- (North Korea) Sung Hyang-sim
- (South Korea) Choi Jeong-min

2 goals

- (China) Zhang Linyan
- (Japan) Saori Takarada
- (South Korea) Mun Eun-ju
- (Thailand) Kanyanat Chetthabutr
- (Thailand) Karen Yaowaporn Lohrmann

1 goal

- (China) Chen Yuanmeng
- (China) Shen Mengyu
- (China) Zhao Yujie
- (Japan) Rio Kanekatsu
- (Japan) Seira Kojima
- (Japan) Fuka Nagano
- (North Korea) Choe Un-chong
- (North Korea) Ri Un-jong
- (South Korea) Gwon Hui-seon
- (South Korea) Jung Min-young
- (South Korea) Yang Hyeon-ji
- (Thailand) Nutwadee Pram-nak
- (Uzbekistan) Shahnoza Kurbonova
- (Uzbekistan) Makhliyo Nazarkulova
- (Uzbekistan) Maftuna Panjieva
