= Amirbek Saidov =

Uzbek footballer (born 2006)

Personal information
- Date of birth: 1 February 2006 (age 20)
- Place of birth: Tashkent, Uzbekistan
- Height: 1.82 m (6 ft 0 in)
- Position: Striker

Team information
- Current team: Sogdiana (on loan from Jedinstvo Ub)
- Number: 29

Youth career
- –2023: Bunyodkor

Senior career*
Years	Team	Apps	(Gls)
2023–2024	Bunyodkor	6	(0)
2024–	Jedinstvo Ub	5	(0)
2025	→ Bukhara (loan)	6	(0)
2026–	→ Sogdiana (loan)	6	(0)

International career^{‡}
2022–2023	Uzbekistan U17	22	(13)
2024–	Uzbekistan U20	5	(0)
- * Club domestic league appearances and goals as of 29 July 2026 ‡ National team caps and goals as of 27 May 2024

Amirbek Saidov (Uzbek: Амирбек Саидов; born 1 February 2006) is an Uzbek professional footballer who plays as a striker for Sogdiana, on loan from Serbian club Jedinstvo Ub.

== Club career ==
Saidov is a product of the Bunyodkor youth academy. In 2023, he was promoted to the first team.

== International career ==
With the Uzbekistan under-16s, Saidov participated in the 2022 CAFA U-16 Championship and scored 6 goals during competition to be top scorer and helped his team to finish as runner-up.

Saidov featured in the 2023 AFC U-17 Asian Cup with Uzbekistan U17 team. He scored a goal during the tournament as his team manage to reach the semi-finals. Later in the year, he took part in the 2023 FIFA U-17 World Cup with Uzbekistan U17. He scored 3 goals in the group stage to qualify his team to the knockout stage. In the round of 16, he scored a goal in Uzbekistan's 2–1 win against England, qualifying the team to the quarter-finals.

== Honours ==
Individual

- CAFA U-16 Championship top scorer: 2022
