= 2023 CAFA U-14 Girls Championship =

International youth football competition

CAFA U-14 Girls Championship 2023
Чемпионат CAFA-2023 среди женских юниорских сборных (U-14)

Tournament details
- Host country: Tajikistan
- City: Dushanbe
- Dates: 15–19 October
- Teams: 4 (from 1 sub-confederation)
- Venue: 1 (in 1 host city)

Final positions
- Champions: Iran (1st title)
- Runners-up: Kyrgyz Republic
- Third place: Uzbekistan

Tournament statistics
- Matches played: 6
- Goals scored: 19 (3.17 per match)
- Attendance: 245 (41 per match)
- Top scorer(s): (Uzbekistan) Mekhrangiz Khamidova (6 goals)
- Best player: (Iran) Elina Shahbazi
- Fair play award: Tajikistan

2023 CAFA U-14 Girls Championship was the inaugural edition of the CAFA U-14 Girls Championship, the international youth football championship organised by Central Asian Football Association for the girls under-14 national teams of Central Asia. The tournament took place in Dushanbe, Tajikistan from October 15 to 19. Four teams played in the tournament, with players born on or after 1 January 2009 eligible to participate.

Iran clinched the title unbeaten throughout the championship, accumulating seven points from three matches.

== Participating teams ==
A total of 4 (out of 6) CAFA member associations entered the tournament.

| Country | Appearance | Previous best performance |
|---|---|---|
| Iran | 1st | Debut |
| Kyrgyz Republic | 1st | Debut |
| Tajikistan | 1st | Debut |
| Uzbekistan | 1st | Debut |

Did not enter

- Afghanistan
- Turkmenistan

== Main tournament ==
The tournament's official schedule was revealed on 7 October 2023.

All times are local, TTJ (UTC+5)

| Pos | Team | Pld | W | D | L | GF | GA | GD | Pts | Final result |
|---|---|---|---|---|---|---|---|---|---|---|
| 1 | Iran | 3 | 2 | 1 | 0 | 4 | 1 | +3 | 7 | Champions |
| 2 | Kyrgyz Republic | 3 | 1 | 2 | 0 | 4 | 3 | +1 | 5 | Runners-up |
| 3 | Uzbekistan | 3 | 1 | 0 | 2 | 11 | 4 | +7 | 3 | Third place |
| 4 | Tajikistan (H) | 3 | 0 | 1 | 2 | 0 | 11 | −11 | 1 | |

Source: CAFA
Rules for classification: 1) Points; 2) head-to-head matches; 3) Goal difference; 4) Number of goals scored.
(H) Hosts
15 October 2023
12:00

| Iran | 1–1 | Kyrgyz Republic |
|---|---|---|
| Ghorbani 49' | Report (CAFA) | Kulibaeva 10' |

Republican Central Stadium, Dushanbe
Attendance: 50
Referee: Gulshoda Saitkulova (Uzbekistan)
15 October 2023
15:00

| Tajikistan | 0–9 | Uzbekistan |
|---|---|---|
| Ochildieva (yellow card) 44' | Report (UFA); Report (CAFA) | Khamidova 4', 46', 55', 70+1'; Yuldasheva 12'; Alikhonova 18', 25'; Kolosovskaya 37', 49' |

Republican Central Stadium, Dushanbe
Attendance: 20
Referee: Mahnaz Zokaee (Iran)

17 October 2023
12:00

| Uzbekistan | 0–1 | Iran |
|---|---|---|
| | Report (UFA); Report (CAFA) | Ansaricholcheh (yellow card) 24'; Ghorbani 47' (yellow card) 58' |

Republican Central Stadium, Dushanbe
Attendance: 0
Referee: Zukhal Khuchanazarova (Tajikistan)
17 October 2023
15:00

| Kyrgyz Republic | 0–0 | Tajikistan |
|---|---|---|
| Abdirashitova (yellow card) 48' | Report (KFU); Report (CAFA) |

Republican Central Stadium, Dushanbe
Attendance: 100
Referee: Mahnaz Zokaee (Iran)

19 October 2023
12:00

| Kyrgyz Republic | 3–2 | Uzbekistan |
|---|---|---|
| Ishembieva (yellow card) 9'; Makhamatsalieva 12'; Konokbaeva 57'; Dakhova 62' (o.g.) | Report (KFU); Report (UFA); Report (CAFA) | Mamatalieva (yellow card) 35'; Khamidova 45' (pen.), 53'; Abdulazizova (yellow card) 61' |

Republican Central Stadium, Dushanbe
Attendance: 50
Referee: Zukhal Khuchanazarova (Tajikistan)
19 October 2023
15:00

| Tajikistan | 0–2 | Iran |
|---|---|---|
| | Report (CAFA) | Lotfzadeh 23'; Khalili Far 53' |

Republican Central Stadium, Dushanbe
Attendance: 25
Referee: Seiit Doolotkeldi Uulu (Kyrgyz Republic)

== Awards ==
=== Champion ===
2023 CAFA U-14 Girls Championship winners

Iran
First title

=== Player awards ===
The following awards were given after the conclusion of the tournament:

| Most Valuable Player | Top Scorer | Fairplay Award | Special Award |
|---|---|---|---|
| (Iran) Elina Shahbazi | (Uzbekistan) Mekhrangiz Khamidova (6 goals) | Tajikistan | Tajikistan |

== Goalscorers ==
There were 19 goals scored in 6 matches, for an average of 3.17 goals per match.

6 goals

- (Uzbekistan) Mekhrangiz Khamidova

2 goals

- (Iran) Dina Ghorbani
- (Uzbekistan) Shakhzoda Alikhonova
- (Uzbekistan) Sofiya Kolosovskaya

1 goal

- (Iran) Fatemeh Lotfzadeh
- (Iran) Maryam Khalili Far
- (Kyrgyzstan) Gulzhamal Kulibaeva
- (Kyrgyzstan) Sumaiia Makhamatsalieva
- (Kyrgyzstan) Aruuke Konokbaeva
- (Uzbekistan) Charos Yuldasheva

1 own goal

- (Uzbekistan) Mariya Dakhova (against Kyrgyz Republic)

Source: CAFA
