= 2021 CAFA U-17 Women's Championship =

Чемпионат CAFA-2021 среди женских юниорских сборных до 17 лет

Tournament details
- Host country: Tajikistan
- City: Dushanbe
- Dates: 3–7 July
- Teams: 4 (from 1 sub-confederation)
- Venue: 1 (in 1 host city)

Final positions
- Champions: Uzbekistan (1st title)
- Runners-up: Iran
- Third place: Tajikistan
- Fourth place: Afghanistan

Tournament statistics
- Matches played: 6
- Goals scored: 28 (4.67 per match)
- Attendance: 0 (0 per match)
- Top scorer(s): (Uzbekistan) Leyla Rustullaeva (6 goals)
- Best player: (Iran) Mohaddesh Zolfi
- Fair play award: Tajikistan

The CAFA U-17 Women's Championship was the inaugural edition of the CAFA U-17 Women's Championship, the biennial international youth football championship organised by CAFA for the women's under-17 national teams of Central Asia. Tajikistan hosted the tournament from 3 to 7 July. A total of four teams played in the tournament, with players born on or after 1 January 2004 eligible to participate.

Uzbekistan won the title unbeaten to become the inaugural champions of the competition. Host Tajikistan finished third after a defeat to Iran on the final matchday.

== Participating teams ==
Initially, A total of 5 (out of 6) CAFA member national teams entered the tournament. However, despite earlier confirmation of participation, the Kyrgyz Republic withdrew before the start of the tournament, citing unforeseen circumstances.

Team	Appearance	Previous best performance
Afghanistan	1st	—N/a
Iran	1st	—N/a
Tajikistan	1st	—N/a
Uzbekistan	1st	—N/a

Did not enter

- Kyrgyzstan (W)
- Turkmenistan

== Venues ==
All Matches were held at the following Venue:

Dushanbe	2021 CAFA U-17 Women's Championship (Tajikistan)
Republican Central Stadium	2021 CAFA U-17 Women's Championship (Tajikistan)
Capacity: 20,000	2021 CAFA U-17 Women's Championship (Tajikistan)

== Match officials ==
The following officials were appointed for the tournament:

Referees

- (Iran) Maedeh Jaefari
- (Kyrgyzstan) Veronika Bernatskaya
- (Tajikistan) Zuhal Khujanazarova
- (Uzbekistan) Kristina Borisova

Assistant referees

- (Afghanistan) Farahnaz Jalali
- (Afghanistan) Sonia Noorri
- (Iran) Atena Lashani
- (Kyrgyzstan) Adinay Kylychbek Kyzy
- (Tajikistan) Dilshoda Rahmonova
- (Uzbekistan) Zilola Rakhmatova

== Main tournament ==
The original schedule when Kyrgyzstan was participating was published on 28 June 2021. The revised tournament schedule after Kyrgyzstan withdrew was announced on 2 July 2021.

Pos	Team	Pld	W	D	L	GF	GA	GD	Pts	Final result
1	Uzbekistan	3	2	1	0	11	1	+10	7	Champions
2	Iran	3	2	0	1	9	2	+7	6	Runners-up
3	Tajikistan (H)	3	1	1	1	6	6	0	4	Third place
4	Afghanistan	3	0	0	3	2	19	−17	0	

Source: CAFA
Rules for classification: 1) Points; 2) head-to-head matches; 3) Goal difference; 4) Number of goals scored.
(H) Hosts
3 July 2021
18:00

Iran	6–0	Afghanistan
Zolfi 9', 74'; Morshediniknam 13'; Mansoralvares 17'; Norouzi 34'; Soleimani 80+5'	Report

Republican Central Stadium, Dushanbe
Attendance: 0
Referee: Zuhal Khujanazarova (Tajikistan)
3 July 2021
20:45

Uzbekistan	1–1	Tajikistan
Rustullaeva 45'	Report	Dzhalilova 80+1'

Republican Central Stadium, Dushanbe
Attendance: 0
Referee: Maedeh Jaefari (Iran)

5 July 2021
18:00

Iran	0–2	Uzbekistan
	Report	Rustullaeva 40+1', 73'

Republican Central Stadium, Dushanbe
Attendance: 0
Referee: Veronika Bernatskaya (Kyrgyz Republic)
5 July 2021
20:45

Tajikistan	5–2	Afghanistan
Faizulloeva 6', 21', 42'; Nazarova 12'; Gulova 55'	Report	Foladi 3'; Sultani 74'

Republican Central Stadium, Dushanbe
Attendance: 0
Referee: Kristina Borisova (Uzbekistan)

7 July 2021
18:00

Uzbekistan	8–0	Afghanistan
Saydabbosova 20', 41'; Rakhmatulloeva 32'; Rustullaeva 46' (pen.), 56', 67'; Buntina 60'; Egamberdieva 80+2' (pen.)	Report

Republican Central Stadium, Dushanbe
Attendance: 0
Referee: Zuhal Khujanazarova (Tajikistan)
7 July 2021
20:45

Tajikistan	0–3	Iran
	Report	Ezatabadipour 19'; Zolfi 32'; Bagherinasab 63'

Republican Central Stadium, Dushanbe
Attendance: 0
Referee: Veronika Bernatskaya (Kyrgyz Republic)

== Player awards ==
The following awards were given at the conclusion of the tournament:

Top Goalscorer	Best player	Fair Play award	Special award
(Uzbekistan) Leyla Rustullaeva (6 goals)	(Iran) Mohaddesh Zolfi	Tajikistan	Afghanistan

== Goalscorers ==
There were 28 goals scored in 6 matches, for an average of 4.67 goals per match.

6 goals

- (Uzbekistan) Leyla Rustullaeva

3 goals

- (Iran) Mohaddeseh Zolfi
- (Tajikistan) Rukhshona Faizulloeva

2 goals

- (Uzbekistan) Rukhshona Saydabbosova

1 goal

- (Afghanistan) Fatima Foladi
- (Afghanistan) Elnaz Sultani
- (Iran) Ghazal Morshediniknam
- (Iran) Mehrnaz Ezatabadipour
- (Iran) Melika Bagherinasab
- (Iran) Nazaninzahra Mansoralvares
- (Iran) Diyana Norouzi
- (Iran) Sevinij Soleimani
- (Tajikistan) Jonona Nazarova
- (Tajikistan) Munisa Gulova
- (Tajikistan) Umeda Dzhalilova
- (Uzbekistan) Sevinch Rakhmatulloeva
- (Uzbekistan) Kseniya Buntina
- (Uzbekistan) Mehribon Egamberdieva

Source: CAFA
