= Aliakbar Ranjbar =

Iranian footballer (born 2004)

Personal information
- Date of birth: 2 February 2004 (age 22)
- Place of birth: Shiraz, Iran
- Height: 1.78 m (5 ft 10 in)
- Position: Right-back

Team information
- Current team: Paykan
- Number: 23

Youth career
- –2022: Paykan

Senior career*
Years	Team	Apps	(Gls)
2022–	Paykan	33	(0)

International career^{‡}
2022–2023	Iran U20	5	(0)
- * Club domestic league appearances and goals as of 21 April 2025 ‡ National team caps and goals as of 1 March 2023

Aliakbar Ranjbar (Persian: علی اکبر رنجبر; born 2 February 2004) is an Iranian professional footballer who plays as a right-back for Azadegan League club Paykan.

== Club career ==
Born in Shiraz, Ranjbar is a youth product of Paykan.

Ranjbar was promoted to Paykan's senior team in 2022, making his professional debut in a 0–5 Persian Gulf Pro League loss against Sepahan on 12 May 2023.

== International career ==
Ranjbar is a youth international for Iran, having played for the under-20. With Iran U20, he featured in the 2023 AFC U-20 Asian Cup as the second choice right-back, behind Mohammadreza Bordbar.
