= Reza Ghandipour =

Iranian footballer

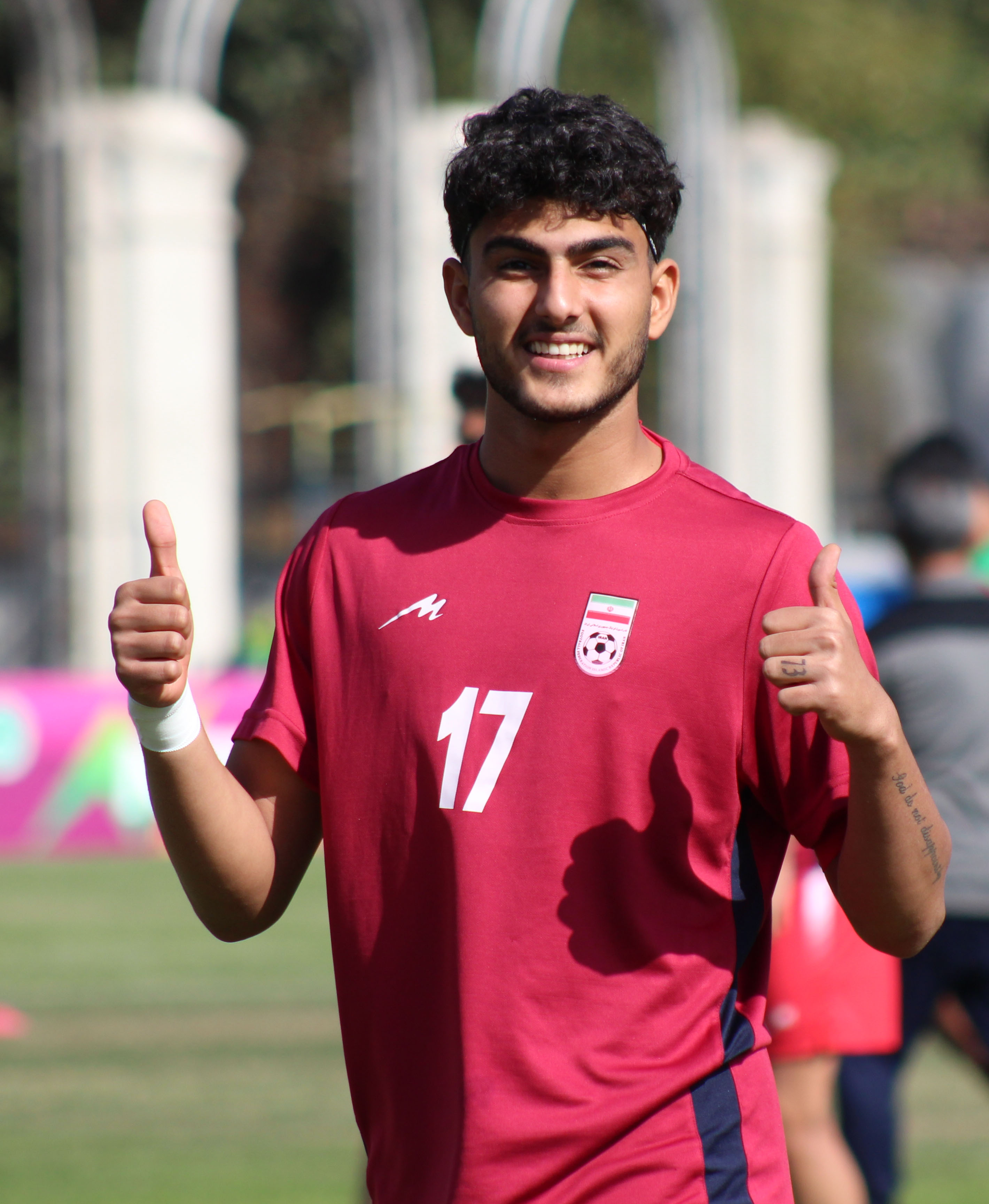
- Reza Ghandipour at the training field in 2023

Personal information
- Date of birth: 13 January 2006 (age 20)
- Place of birth: Behbahan, Iran
- Height: 1.84 m (6 ft 0 in)
- Position: Forward

Team information
- Current team: Shabab Al Ahli
- Number: 9

Youth career
- Behbahan Railway Club
- Sepahan
- –2023: Paykan

Senior career*
Years	Team	Apps	(Gls)
2023–2025	Paykan	8	(1)
2024–2025	→ Malavan (loan)	23	(8)
2025–	Shabab Al Ahli	2	(0)
2025–2026	→ Al Wahda (loan)	10	(1)

International career^{‡}
2022–2024	Iran U17	15	(13)
2024–	Iran U20	7	(7)
- * Club domestic league appearances and goals as of 16 March 2026 ‡ National team caps and goals as of 23 February 2025

Reza Ghandipour (Persian: رضا غندی پور; born 13 January 2006) is an Iranian footballer who plays as a forward for UAE Pro League club Shabab Al Ahli, and the Iran national under-20 team.

== Early career ==
Ghandipour started his football career in Behbahan Railway Club and then joined Sepahan. Ghandipour was the top scorer of the Junior Premier League and participated in the national youth football team of Iran. He joined the national youth football of Iran.

== International career ==
In the 2022 CAFA U-16 Championship, Ghandipour scored 4 goals as Iran finish as champion. He was therefore named as the best player of the tournament.

== Personal life ==
On 16 January 2026, just before their match against South Korea in the 2026 AFC U-23 Asian Cup, Ghandipour, along with his entire team, refused to sing "Mehr-e Khavaran", the national anthem of the Islamic Republic of Iran, in solidarity with the 2025–2026 Iranian protests.

== Honours ==
=== International ===
Iran U16

- CAFA U-16 Championship: 2022
