= Kasra Taheri =

Iranian footballer (born 2006)

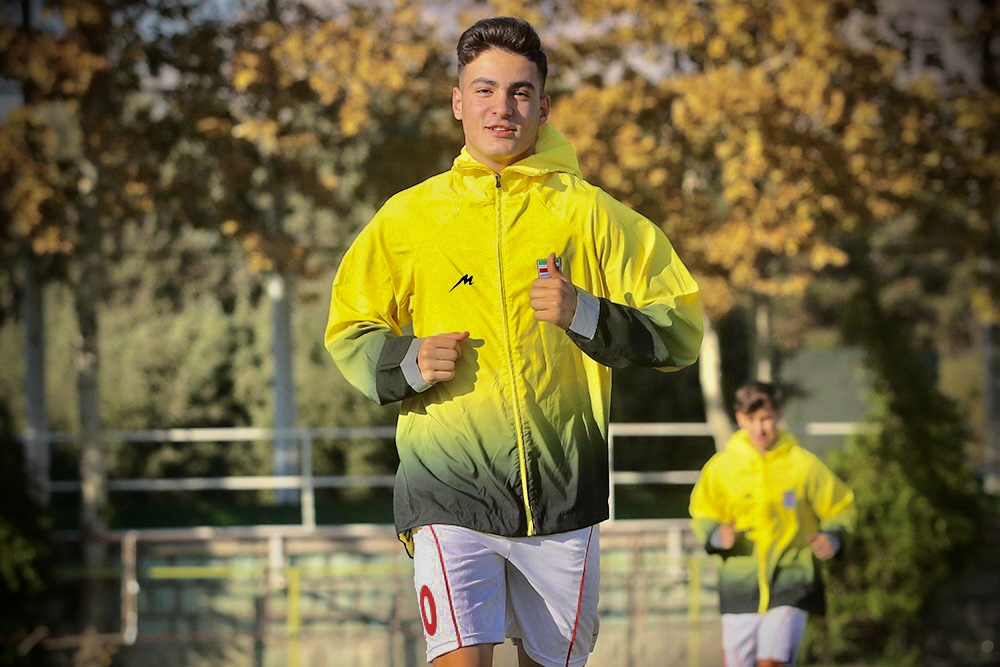
- Kasra Taheri at the training field in 2023

Personal information
- Full name: Kasra Taheri
- Date of birth: 6 August 2006 (age 20)
- Place of birth: Yasuj, Iran
- Height: 1.86 m (6 ft 1 in)
- Position: Striker

Team information
- Current team: Sepahan
- Number: 70

Youth career
- Sepahan

Senior career*
Years	Team	Apps	(Gls)
2023–2024	Sepahan	0	(0)
2024–2026	Rubin Kazan	4	(0)
2025–2026	→ Paykan (loan)	7	(4)
2026	Nassaji Mazandaran	0	(0)
2026–	Sepahan	10	(6)

International career^{‡}
2022–2023	Iran U17	19	(12)
2024–2025	Iran U20	3	(3)
2025–	Iran U23	2	(5)
2025–	Iran	3	(0)
- * Club domestic league appearances and goals as of 19 March 2026 ‡ National team caps and goals as of 29 May 2026

Kasra Taheri (Persian: کسری طاهری; born 6 August 2006) is an Iranian footballer who plays as a striker for Iranian club Sepahan and the Iran national team.

== Early career ==
At the age of 11, Taheri participated in a youth trial with Sepahan and was admitted to their youth team.

== Club career ==
On 19 February 2024, Taheri signed a three-year contract with Russian Premier League club Rubin Kazan. He became the fourth Iranian player in Rubin's history, following Sardar Azmoun, Reza Shekari and Alireza Haghighi.

Taheri made his debut for Rubin on 8 April 2024 against Orenburg.

On 27 July 2025, Taheri was loaned to Paykan for the 2025–26 season.

== International career ==
Taheri participated in the 2022 CAFA U-16 Championship with Iran U16. He scored 3 goals during the tournament, the second highest in the team as his team were crowned as champion.

With Iran U17, Taheri featured in the 2023 AFC U-17 Asian Cup. He scored 2 goals during the tournament, both against Afghanistan in the group stage. Iran later reached the semi-finals and qualified for the 2023 FIFA U-17 World Cup.

Taheri was part of the Iran U17 squad that participated in the 2023 FIFA U-17 World Cup. He scored 2 goals in the group stage against Brazil and New Caledonia to help his team advance to the round of 16, where they lost to Morocco on the penalty shootouts with Taheri eventually missing his attempt.

Kasra Taheri was invited to the Iran U23 by Ravankhah in August 2025 to participate in the 2026 AFC U-23 Asian Cup qualification.

Ghalenoei On 4 October 2025, invited Kasra Taheri to the Iranian national team camp for friendly matches against Russia and Tanzania.

He made his debut against Russia on 10 October 2025 in Friendly match.

Taheri, along with Omid Noorafkan, announced he would not travel with the national team to Mexico to play in the 2026 FIFA World Cup.

=== International ===
As of match played 29 May 2026

Appearances and goals by national team and year
National team	Year	Apps	Goals
Iran
Iran	2025	2	0
Iran	2026	1	0
Total		3	0

== Career statistics ==
As of 3 October 2025

Appearances and goals by club, season and competition
Club	Season	League			Cup		Continental		Other		Total	
Club	Season	Division	Apps	Goals	Apps	Goals	Apps	Goals	Apps	Goals	Apps	Goals
Sepahan	2023–24	Pro League	0	0	0	0	0	0	—		0	0
Rubin Kazan	2023–24	Russian Premier League	2	0	0	0	—		—		2	0
Rubin Kazan	2024–25	Russian Premier League	2	0	2	0	—		—		4	0
Rubin Kazan	Total		4	0	2	0	—		—		6	0
Paykan	2025–26	Pro League	6	4	0	0	—		—		6	4
Career totals			10	4	2	0	0	0	0	0	12	4

== Honours ==
=== International ===
Iran U16

- CAFA U-16 Championship: 2022
