= 2017 CAFA U-15 Championship =

Tournament details
- Host country: Tajikistan
- City: Hisor
- Dates: 2–9 July
- Teams: 5 (from 1 sub-confederation)
- Venue: 1 (in 1 host city)

Final positions
- Champions: Afghanistan (1st title)
- Runners-up: Uzbekistan
- Third place: Turkmenistan
- Fourth place: Kyrgyzstan

Tournament statistics
- Matches played: 10
- Goals scored: 37 (3.7 per match)
- Attendance: 13,200 (1,320 per match)
- Top scorer(s): (Uzbekistan) Buronbek Mirzasalimov (5 goals)
- Best player: (Tajikistan) Sherzod Dadaboev
- Best goalkeeper: (Kyrgyzstan) Shumkarbek Topchubaev

The 2017 CAFA U-15 Championship was the inaugural edition of the CAFA U-15 Championship, the international youth football championship organized by CAFA for the men's under-15 national teams of Central Asia. Tajikistan was hosting the tournament. Five teams entered the tournament, with players born on or after 1 January 2002 eligible to participate.

Afghanistan clinched the title of the inaugural championship after beating Uzbekistan 3–2 on the final matchday.

== Participating teams ==
5 (out of 6) CAFA member associations entered the tournament. Although Iran initially entered, they withdrew before the start of the tournament.

Team	App.	Previous best performance
Afghanistan	1st	Debut
Kyrgyzstan	1st	Debut
Tajikistan	1st	Debut
Turkmenistan	1st	Debut
Uzbekistan	1st	Debut

did not enter

- Iran (W)

== Venues ==
Following Iran's withdrawal, all matches were relocated to the Hisor Central Stadium. Initially, matches were planned to be held in both Dushanbe and Hisor, but due to Iran's withdrawal, Hisor became the sole venue for all matches.

Hisor	2017 CAFA U-15 Championship (Tajikistan)
Hisor Central Stadium	2017 CAFA U-15 Championship (Tajikistan)
Capacity: 20,000	2017 CAFA U-15 Championship (Tajikistan)

== Main tournament ==
The Original final tournament schedule was announced on 19 June 2017. A modified tournament schedule was announced on 30 June 2017, after Iran withdrew from the competition.

Pos	Team	Pld	W	D	L	GF	GA	GD	Pts	Final result
1	Afghanistan	4	3	0	1	9	5	+4	9 (Note: Head-to-head points: Afghanistan 3, Uzbekistan 0)	Champions
2	Uzbekistan	4	3	0	1	12	7	+5	9	Runners-up
3	Turkmenistan	4	2	0	2	7	9	−2	6	Third place
4	Kyrgyzstan	4	1	0	3	4	8	−4	3 (Note: Head-to-head points: Kyrgyzstan 3, Tajikistan 0)	
5	Tajikistan (H)	4	1	0	3	5	8	−3	3	

Source: CAFA
(H) Hosts
Notes:
3 July 2017
18:00

Kyrgyzstan	1–2	Uzbekistan
Kenzhabekov 49'	Report	Abdualimov 21'; Mirzasalimov 69'

Hisor Central Stadium, Hisor
Attendance: 200
Referee: Sadullo Gulmurodi (Tajikistan)
3 July 2017
21:00

Afghanistan	3–1	Tajikistan
Naseri 2'; Hussaini 83', 90+6'	Report	Nazarov 41'

Hisor Central Stadium, Hisor
Attendance: 500
Referee: Jasur Mukhtarov (Uzbekistan)

4 July 2017
18:00

Kyrgyzstan	1–3	Afghanistan
Kudaiberdiev 46'	Report	Samandari 36'; Naseri 54'; Mirzoda 57'

Hisor Central Stadium, Hisor
Attendance: 900
Referee: Dzhumamurad Dzhumamuradov (Turkmenistan)
4 July 2017
21:00

Uzbekistan	6–2	Turkmenistan
Abdumannonov 42' (pen.); Gudjikow 44' (o.g.); Mirzosalimov 46', 77'; Akhrorbekov 50'; Kakhorjonov 62'	Report	Palwanow 58'; Orazow 75'

Hisor Central Stadium, Hisor
Attendance: 1,100
Referee: Spartak Danilenko (Kyrgyzstan)

5 July 2017
18:00

Turkmenistan	3–0	Kyrgyzstan
Palwanow 3', 27'; Gudjikow 47'	Report

Hisor Central Stadium, Hisor
Attendance: 700
Referee: Halim Aqa Shirzad (Afghanistan)
5 July 2017
21:00

Tajikistan	1–2	Uzbekistan
Rakhimov 70'	Report	Mirzasalimov 60', 69'

Hisor Central Stadium, Hisor
Attendance: 1,600
Referee: Dzhumamurad Dzhumamuradov (Turkmenistan)

7 July 2017
18:00

Afghanistan	0–1	Turkmenistan
	Report	Gylyçmyradow 46'

Hisor Central Stadium, Hisor
Attendance: 400
Referee: Sadullo Gulmurodi (Tajikistan)
7 July 2017
21:00

Tajikistan	0–2	Kyrgyzstan
	Report	Berekeev 36'; Erkinbek uulu 64'

Hisor Central Stadium, Hisor
Attendance: 3,500
Referee: Jasur Mukhtarov (Uzbekistan)

9 July 2017
18:00

Afghanistan	3–2	Uzbekistan
Samandari 6'; Mirzada 48'; Hussaini 78'	Report	Norchaev 39'; Davronov 83'

Hisor Central Stadium, Hisor
Attendance: 800
Referee: Spartak Danilenko (Kyrgyzstan)
9 July 2017
21:00

Turkmenistan	1–3	Tajikistan
Durdyýew 12'	Report	Nazarov 9'; Bobokhonov 10', 85'

Hisor Central Stadium, Hisor
Attendance: 3,500
Referee: Halim Aqa Shirzad (Afghanistan)

== Goalscorers ==
There were 37 goals scored in 10 matches, for an average of 3.7 goals per match.

5 goals

- (Uzbekistan) Buronbek Mirzasalimov

3 goals

- (Afghanistan) Sayed Asghar Hussaini
- (Turkmenistan) Timur Palwanow

2 goals

- (Afghanistan) Fardeen Naseri
- (Afghanistan) Samir Samandari
- (Afghanistan) Ahmad Tamim Mirzada
- (Tajikistan) Farkhod Bobokhonov
- (Tajikistan) Faiziddin Nazarov

1 goal

- (Kyrgyzstan) Aktan Berekeev
- (Kyrgyzstan) Kubatbek Erkinbek uulu
- (Kyrgyzstan) Bekzat Kenzhabekov
- (Kyrgyzstan) Mirlanbek Kudaiberdiev
- (Tajikistan) Alisher Rakhimov
- (Turkmenistan) Meýlis Durdyýew
- (Turkmenistan) Hemra Gudjikow
- (Turkmenistan) Azym Gylyçmyradow
- (Turkmenistan) Oraz Orazow
- (Uzbekistan) Khusain Norchaev
- (Uzbekistan) Alibek Davronov
- (Uzbekistan) Bektemir Abdumannonov
- (Uzbekistan) Nurbek Akhrorbekov
- (Uzbekistan) Jasurbek Kakhorjonov
- (Uzbekistan) Javokhir Abdualimov

1 own goal

- (Turkmenistan) Hemra Gudjikow (against Uzbekistan)

Source: CAFA

== Awards ==
The following awards were given at the conclusion of the tournament:

Top Goalscorer	Best player	Best goalkeeper
(Uzbekistan) Buronbek Mirzasalimov	(Tajikistan) Sherzod Dadaboev	(Kyrgyzstan) Shumkarbek Topchubaev
