= 2019 CAFA U-15 Girls Championship =

International youth football competition

Tournament details
- Host country: Uzbekistan
- City: Tashkent
- Dates: 13–16 September
- Teams: 4 (from 1 sub-confederation)
- Venue(s): 2 (in 1 host city)

Final positions
- Champions: Iran (1st title)
- Runners-up: Kyrgyzstan
- Third place: Tajikistan

Tournament statistics
- Matches played: 6
- Goals scored: 27 (4.5 per match)
- Attendance: 550 (92 per match)
- Top scorer(s): (Kyrgyzstan) Aiana Karataeva (6 goals)
- Best player(s): (Iran) Mohaddeseh Zolfi
- Best goalkeeper: Kyrgyzstan

The 2019 CAFA U-15 Girls Championship was the second edition of the CAFA U-15 Girls Championship, the international women's football youth championship of Central Asia organized by the Central Asian Football Association (CAFA). It took place in Tashkent, Uzbekistan from 13 to 16 September 2019.

The host Uzbekistan entered the tournament as the defending champions having won last year's edition in Tajikistan. However, they were unable to defend their title, finishing in last place. meanwhile, Iran won the Championship title for the first time, after finishing undefeated throughout the round-robin competition.

== Participating teams ==
A total of 4 (out of 6) CAFA member national teams entered the tournament.

Country	App.	Previous best performance
Iran	2nd	Runners-up (2017)
Kyrgyzstan	2nd	Fourth place (2017)
Tajikistan	2nd	Third place (2017)
Uzbekistan	2nd	Champions (2017)

Did not enter

- Afghanistan
- Turkmenistan

== Match officials ==
The following referees and assistant referees were selected to officiate the tournament:

Referees

- (Afghanistan) Yasmin Haidary
- (Iran) Asou Javaheri
- (Kyrgyzstan) Malika Kadyrova
- (Uzbekistan) Edita Mirabidova

Assistant referees

- (Afghanistan) Farishta Shaihmiri
- (Iran) Zhaleh Toofanpour
- (Kyrgyzstan) Zhibek Akyl Kyzy
- (Uzbekistan) Khairinisa Erkinova

== Main tournament ==
All times are local, TUZ (UTC+5)

Pos	Team	Pld	W	D	L	GF	GA	GD	Pts	Final result
1	Iran	3	3	0	0	8	2	+6	9	Champions
2	Kyrgyzstan	3	2	0	1	12	4	+8	6	Runners-up
3	Tajikistan	3	1	0	2	3	10	−7	3	Third place
4	Uzbekistan (H)	3	0	0	3	4	11	−7	0	

Updated to match(es) played on unknown. Source: CAFA
Rules for classification: 1) Points; 2) head-to-head matches; 3) Goal difference; 4) Number of goals scored.
(H) Hosts
13 September 2019
12:00

Uzbekistan	2–6	Kyrgyzstan
Rustullaeva 60', 64' (pen.)	Report	Diushenova 11'; Karataeva 23', 45', 67', 70+3'; Rysbekova 69'

Chigatay Stadium, Tashkent
Attendance: 50
Referee: Asou Javaheri (Iran)
13 September 2019
16:00

Iran	4–0	Tajikistan
Zolfi 9', 35+3'; Imomalieva 26' (o.g.); Yousefi 70+3'	Report

Chigatay Stadium, Tashkent
Attendance: 63
Referee: Edita Mirabidova (Uzbekistan)

14 September 2019
12:00

Kyrgyzstan	0–1	Iran
	Report	Zolfi 43'

Chigatay Stadium, Tashkent
Attendance: 47
Referee: Edita Mirabidova (Uzbekistan)
14 September 2019
16:00

Tajikistan	2–0	Uzbekistan
Fayzulloeva 2', 35+3'	Report

Chigatay Stadium, Tashkent
Attendance: 60
Referee: Yasmin Haidary (Afghanistan)

16 September 2019
12:00

Tajikistan	1–6	Kyrgyzstan
Kayumova 40'	Report	Karataeva 6', 70'; Khudoiarova 41', 45'; Termez Kyzy 48'; Turgumbaeva 68'

Lokomotiv Stadium, Tashkent
Attendance: 30
Referee: Asou Javaheri (Iran)
16 September 2019
16:00

Uzbekistan	2–3	Iran
Rustullaeva 46'; Abdukarimova 70+4'	Report	Yousefi 26'; Morshediniknam 56'; Norouzi 70+2'

Lokomotiv Stadium, Tashkent
Attendance: 300
Referee: Malika Kadyrova (Kyrgyzstan)

== Goalscorers ==
There were 27 goals scored in 6 matches, for an average of 4.5 goals per match.

6 goals

- (Kyrgyzstan) Aiana Karataeva

3 goals

- (Iran) Mohaddeseh Zolfi
- (Uzbekistan) Leyla Rustullaeva

2 goals

- (Iran) Seyedehfatemeh Yousefi
- (Kyrgyzstan) Almira Khudoiarova
- (Tajikistan) Rukhshona Fayzulloeva

1 goal

- (Iran) Ghazal Morshediniknam
- (Iran) Diyana Norouzi
- (Kyrgyzstan) Aruuke Diushenova
- (Kyrgyzstan) Madina Rysbekova
- (Kyrgyzstan) Elvira Termez Kyzy
- (Kyrgyzstan) Asem Turgumbaeva
- (Tajikistan) Malika Kayumova
- (Uzbekistan) Makhzuna Abdukarimova

1 own goal

- (Tajikistan) Dildora Imomalieva (against Iran)

Source: CAFA

== Awards ==
=== Champion ===
2019 CAFA U-15 Girls Championship winners

Iran
First title

=== Individual awards ===
The following awards were given after the conclusion of the tournament.

Most Valuable Player	Top Scorer	Fairplay Award	Special Award
(Iran) Mohaddeseh Zolfi	(Kyrgyzstan) Aiana Karataeva	Kyrgyzstan	Uzbekistan
