= 2018 CAFA U-16 Championship =

Tournament details
- Host country: Uzbekistan
- City: Tashkent
- Dates: 3–13 July
- Teams: 4 (from 1 sub-confederation)
- Venue(s): 2 (in 1 host city)

Final positions
- Champions: Uzbekistan (1st title)
- Runners-up: Afghanistan
- Third place: Tajikistan
- Fourth place: Kyrgyzstan

Tournament statistics
- Matches played: 6
- Goals scored: 23 (3.83 per match)
- Attendance: 3,150 (525 per match)
- Top scorer(s): (Uzbekistan) Temur Mamasidikov (3 goals)
- Best player(s): (Uzbekistan) Jasurbek Jaloliddinov
- Fair play award: Afghanistan

The 2018 CAFA U-16 Championship was the inaugural edition of the CAFA U-16 Championship, the international youth football championship organized by Central Asian Football Association (CAFA) for the men's under-16 national teams of Central Asia. The tournament took place in Tashkent, Uzbekistan. featuring four participating teams, with players born on or after 1 January 2002 eligible to participate.

Uzbekistan was crowned champions of the first-ever under-16 edition after finishing at the top of the standings, unbeaten in all three matchdays.

== Participating teams ==
4 (out of 6) CAFA member nations participated in the tournament.

Team	App.	Previous best performance
Afghanistan	1st	Debut
Kyrgyzstan	1st	Debut
Tajikistan	1st	Debut
Uzbekistan	1st	Debut

Did not enter

- Iran
- Turkmenistan

== Venues ==
The tournament took place in 2 venues situated across Tashkent.

Tashkent		2018 CAFA U-16 Championship (Uzbekistan)
Lokomotiv Stadium	National Stadium	2018 CAFA U-16 Championship (Uzbekistan)
Capacity: 8,000	Capacity: 33,834	2018 CAFA U-16 Championship (Uzbekistan)

== Main tournament ==
The final tournament schedule was announced on 27 June 2018.

Pos	Team	Pld	W	D	L	GF	GA	GD	Pts	Final result
1	Uzbekistan (H)	3	3	0	0	12	2	+10	9	Champions
2	Afghanistan	3	2	0	1	6	4	+2	6	Runners-up
3	Tajikistan	3	0	1	2	3	6	−3	1	Third place
4	Kyrgyzstan	3	0	1	2	2	11	−9	1	

Source: CAFA
(H) Hosts
5 July 2018
17:00

Afghanistan	1–4	Uzbekistan
Ubaydullaev 8' (o.g.)	Report	Mamasidikov 29', 44'; Chikrizov 40'; Norchaev 87'

National Stadium, Tashkent
Attendance: 1,049
Referee: Meder Taichiev (Kyrgyzstan)
5 July 2018
20:00

Kyrgyzstan	2–2	Tajikistan
Kanybekov 29' (pen.); Khudaiberdiev 36'	Report	Fuzailov 17'; Niyozbekov 23'

National Stadium, Tashkent
Attendance: 145
Referee: Jasur Mukhtarov (Uzbekistan)

7 July 2018
17:00

Uzbekistan	5–0	Kyrgyzstan
Ubaydullaev 5'; Sattorov 41'; Chikrizov 43'; Mamasidikov 54'; Nasirov 80'	Report

National Stadium, Tashkent
Attendance: 748
Referee: Sayodzhon Zainiddinov (Tajikistan)
7 July 2018
20:00

Tajikistan	0–1	Afghanistan
	Report	Bobonazarov 68' (o.g.)

National Stadium, Tashkent
Attendance: 518
Referee: Jasur Mukhtarov (Uzbekistan)

9 July 2018
16:45

Tajikistan	1–3	Uzbekistan
Ramazonov 75'	Report	Roziev 37', 56'; Jaloliddinov 85'

Lokomotiv Stadium, Tashkent
Attendance: 345
Referee: Meder Taichiev (Kyrgyzstan)
9 July 2018
20:30

Afghanistan	4–0	Kyrgyzstan
Sediqi 2', 22'; Samandari 13', 17'	Report

Lokomotiv Stadium, Tashkent
Attendance: 345
Referee: Sayodzhon Zainiddinov (Tajikistan)

== Goalscorers ==
There were 23 goals scored in 6 matches, for an average of 3.83 goals per match.

3 goals

- (Uzbekistan) Temur Mamasidikov

2 goals

- (Afghanistan) Abdulahad Sediqi
- (Afghanistan) Samir Samandari
- (Uzbekistan) Igor Chikrizov
- (Uzbekistan) Ruslan Roziev

1 goal

- (Kyrgyzstan) Adilet Kanybekov
- (Kyrgyzstan) Mirlanbek Khudaiberdiev
- (Tajikistan) Zukhriddin Fuzailov
- (Tajikistan) Alinur Niyozbekov
- (Tajikistan) Umedjon Ramazonov
- (Uzbekistan) Jasurbek Jaloliddinov
- (Uzbekistan) Muhammadyusuf Nasirov
- (Uzbekistan) Khusayin Norchaev
- (Uzbekistan) Mironshokh Sattorov
- (Uzbekistan) Khurshid Ubaydullaev

1 own goal

- (Tajikistan) Firuzjon Bobonazarov (against Afghanistan)
- (Uzbekistan) Khurshid Ubaydullaev (against Afghanistan)

Source: CAFA

== Awards ==
The following awards were given at the conclusion of the tournament:

Top Goalscorer	Best player	Fair Play award	Special award
(Uzbekistan) Temur Mamasidikov	(Uzbekistan) Jasurbek Jaloliddinov	Afghanistan	Kyrgyzstan
