= Yadegar Rostami =

Iranian footballer

Personal information
- Date of birth: 2 January 2004 (age 22)
- Place of birth: Marivan, Iran
- Height: 1.81 m (5 ft 11 in)
- Position: Midfielder

Team information
- Current team: Fajr Sepasi
- Number: 10

Youth career
- –2022: KIA

Senior career*
Years	Team	Apps	(Gls)
2022–2025	Pogoń Szczecin II	44	(10)
2022–2025	Pogoń Szczecin	3	(0)
2024	→ ŁKS Łódź (loan)	1	(0)
2024	→ ŁKS Łódź II (loan)	7	(1)
2025–	Fajr Sepasi	31	(6)

International career^{‡}
2022	Iran U23	3	(0)
- * Club domestic league appearances and goals as of 6 May 2025 ‡ National team caps and goals as of 7 June 2022

Yadegar Rostami (Persian: یادگار رستمی; born 2 January 2004) is an Iranian professional footballer who plays as a midfielder for Azadegan League club Fajr Sepasi.

== Personal life ==
On 16 January 2026, just before their match against South Korea in the 2026 AFC U-23 Asian Cup, Mahdavi, along with his entire team, refused to sing "Mehr-e Khavaran", the national anthem of the Islamic Republic of Iran, in solidarity with the 2025–2026 Iranian protests.
