= Hisor Central Stadium =

Multi-purpose stadium in Hisor, Tajikistan

- Interactive map of Hisor Central Stadium
- Full name: Hisor Central Stadium; Варзишгохи марказии Ҳисор
- Location: Hisor
- Coordinates: 38°32′58.396″N 68°33′23.301″E
- Owner: Government of the Republic of Tajikistan
- Capacity: 20,000
- Record attendance: 20,000
- Field size: 110 m × 75 m (361 ft × 246 ft)

Construction
- Built: 2014; 12 years ago
- Opened: October 27, 2015; 11 years ago
- Cost: >42 million SM

The Hisor Central Stadium (Tajik: Варзишгохи марказии Ҳисор, romanized: Varzishgoxi markazii Hisor) is a multi-purpose stadium in Hisor, Tajikistan. It is currently used mostly for football matches. Ever since it opened in 2015, this stadium, which can hold 20,000 people, has been the home of football club Barkchi and the Tajikistan national football team.

== History ==
The stadium was opened on 27 October 2015, to commemorate the 3000th anniversary of Hisor. Tajik President Emomali Rahmon attended the ceremony. The construction of the stadium amounted to a little over 42 million somoni.

In July 2017, the stadium hosted its first international tournament the 2017 CAFA U-15 Girls Championship.

On 4 November 2017, the stadium hosted the 2017 AFC Cup final between FC Istiklol and Iraqi Al-Quwa Al-Jawiya.

== Major tournament matches ==
=== AFC Cup ===
Date	Team #1	Result	Team #2	Round	Attendance	Edition
4 May 2017	(Tajikistan) Istiklol	0–1	(Iraq) Al-Quwa Al-Jawiya	Final	20,000	2017 AFC Cup

== See also ==
- Republic Central Stadium
