= Uzbekistan women's national under-17 football team =

Women's national association football team for Uzbekistan

Uzbekistan Women's U-17
- Association: Uzbekistan Football Federation
- Confederation: AFC (Asia)
- Sub-confederation: CAFA (Central Asia)
- Head coach: (Uzbekistan) Ilxam Xanjariyev
- Captain: Angelina Polyushkevich
- Home stadium: Pakhtakor Stadium
- FIFA code: UZB
First colours	Second colours

First international
- Uzbekistan 1–3 India (Kuala Lumpur, Malaysia; 9 November 2008)

Biggest win
- Uzbekistan 17–0 Bahrain (Colombo, Sri Lanka; 22 December 2014)

Biggest defeat
- China 9–0 Uzbekistan (Kuala Lumpur, Malaysia; 13 November 2008)

AFC U-17 Women's Asian Cup
- Appearances: 2 (first in 2013)
- Best result: Group stage (2013, 2015)

The Uzbekistan women's national U-17 football team (Uzbek: Oʻzbekiston ayollar milliy futbol terma jamoasi) is the female age of under-17 team representative football team for Uzbekistan. It has played in two AFC U-17 Women's Asian Cup but has not yet qualified for the FIFA U-17 Women's World Cup.

== History ==
The Uzbekistan women's national under-17 football team represent the country in the women's under age of 17. The team plays AFC U-17 Women's Asian Cup. The team have qualified in the tournament 2013 and 2015 where they exit from group stage. The team has not yet qualified to the FIFA U-17 Women's World Cup.

== Current squad ==
The following squad was announced for 2019 AFC U-16 Women's Championship qualification.

As of 20 September 2019

No.	Pos.	Player	Date of birth (age)	Caps	Goals	Club
1	GK	Aziza Davlatova	30 May 2004	0	0	(Uzbekistan Football Association)
2	FW	Angelina Akteryakova	29 January 2003	0	0	(Uzbekistan Football Association) Andijon
3	DF	Maxliyo Zoidboyeva	8 May 2004	0	0	(Uzbekistan Football Association) Sogdiona Jizzan
4	DF	Zarina Jumayeva	2 September 2003	0	0	(Uzbekistan Football Association) AGMK
5	MF	Fotima Tursunaliyeva	23 October 2003	0	0	(Uzbekistan Football Association) Andijon
6	FW	Oysara Suyunova	30 July 2003	0	0	(Uzbekistan Football Association) Sogdiana
7	MF	Kamola Erkinova	7 September 2003	0	0	(Uzbekistan Football Association)
8	FW	Zuhra Tursunaliyeva	9 February 2004	0	0	(Uzbekistan Football Association)
9	MF	Diyora Joʻraboyeva	14 May 2003	0	0	(Uzbekistan Football Association)
10	MF	Parvina Sodiqova	24 August 2003	0	0	(Uzbekistan Football Association)
11	FW	Leyla Oraniyazova	7 November 2004	0	0	(Uzbekistan Football Association)
12	GK	Angelina Polyushkevich (Captain)	3 January 2003	0	0	(Uzbekistan Football Association) Nasaf Qarshi
13	MF	Zarina Mamatkarimova	19 May 2003	0	0	(Uzbekistan Football Association)
14	DF	Marina Kosnikova	5 January 2003	0	0	(Uzbekistan Football Association)
15	MF	Umida Xatamova	27 September 2004	0	0	(Uzbekistan Football Association)
16	DF	Sevinch Qoʻchqorova	17 February 2004	0	0	(Uzbekistan Football Association)
17	MF	Nozima Sheraliyeva	28 December 2004	0	0	(Uzbekistan Football Association)
18	DF	Sevinch Ashurova	23 July 2004	0	0	(Uzbekistan Football Association)
19	MF	Durdona Aliyeva	30 August 2004	0	0	(Uzbekistan Football Association)
20	DF	Rushana Toshpulatova	27 April 2004	0	0	(Uzbekistan Football Association)
22	FW	Maxzuna Abdukarimova	4 April 2003	0	0	(Uzbekistan Football Association)
23	FW	Oʻgʻiloy Saydullayeva	18 July 2004	0	0	(Uzbekistan Football Association)
25	DF	Nodira Iskandarova	10 March 2004	0	0	(Uzbekistan Football Association)

== Fixtures and results ==
https://www.flashscore.co.uk/team/uzbekistan/OY1oxl17/results/

legend

Win Draw Loss Fixture

=== 2026 ===
5 October 2026 2027 AFC U-17 Women's Asian Cup qualification	Philippines	v	Uzbekistan	Do'stlik Stadium, Tashkent, Uzbekistan
--:-- UTC+5

8 October 2026 2027 AFC U-17 Women's Asian Cup qualification	Bangladesh	v	Uzbekistan	Do'stlik Stadium, Tashkent, Uzbekistan
--:-- UTC+5

== Competitive record ==
=== FIFA U-17 Women's World Cup ===
FIFA U-17 Women's World Cup record
Year	Result	Position	Pld	W	D	L	GF	GA
(New Zealand) 2008	Did not qualify							
(Trinidad and Tobago) 2010	Did not qualify							
(Azerbaijan) 2012	Did not qualify							
(Costa Rica) 2014	Did not qualify							
(Jordan) 2016	Did not qualify							
(Uruguay) 2018	Did not qualify							
(India) 2022	Did not qualify							
(Dominican Republic) 2024	Did not qualify							
(Morocco) 2025	Did not qualify							
(Morocco) 2026	Did not qualify							
(Morocco) 2027	Did not qualify							
Total	0/9	0 Titles	0	0	0	0	0	0

*Draws include knockout matches decided on penalty kicks.

=== AFC U-17 Women's Asian Cup ===
AFC U-17 Women's Championship record
Year	Round	Position	MP	W	D*	L	GF	GA
(Japan) 2005 to (China) 2011	Did not qualify							
(China) 2013	Group stage	9/12	2	0	1	1	0	3
(China) 2015	Group stage	6/8	3	1	0	2	3	8
(Thailand) 2017 to (Thailand) 2019	Did not qualify							
(Indonesia) 2022	Did not held							
(Indonesia) 2024	Did not qualify							
(China) 2026	Did not qualify							
(China) 2027	Did not qualify							
Total	2/9	0 Titles	5	1	1	3	3	11

*Draws include knockout matches decided on penalty kicks.

=== AFC U-17 Women's Asian Cup qualification ===
AFC U-17 Women's Championship qualification record
Year	Round	Position	MP	W	D*	L	GF	GA
(Japan) 2005 to (Malaysia) 2007	Did not participate							
(Thailand) 2009	DNQ	–	3	0	0	3	1	13
(China) 2011	Did not participate							
(China) 2013	Qualified	–	3	2	1	0	10	1
(China) 2015	Qualified	–	2	2	0	0	22	0
(Thailand) 2017	DNQ	–	5	2	1	2	9	12
(Thailand) 2019	DNQ	–	4	2	1	1	7	9
(Indonesia) 2022	Did not held							
(Indonesia) 2024	DNQ	–	2	1	0	1	2	4
(China) 2026	DNQ	–	2	0	0	2	2	4
Total	7/10	0 Titles	21	9	3	9	53	43

*Draws include knockout matches decided on penalty kicks.
