= 2017 CAFA U-15 Girls Championship =

International youth football competition

Tournament details
- Host country: Tajikistan
- City: Hisor
- Dates: 26–28 August
- Teams: 4 (from 1 sub-confederation)
- Venue: 1 (in 1 host city)

Final positions
- Champions: Uzbekistan (1st title)
- Runners-up: Iran
- Third place: Tajikistan

Tournament statistics
- Matches played: 6
- Goals scored: 20 (3.33 per match)
- Top scorer: (Uzbekistan) Tojinisokhon Rashidova
- Best player: (Uzbekistan) Diyora Erkinova
- Best goalkeeper: (Iran) Fatemeh Ijadi

The 2017 CAFA U-15 Girls Championship was the inaugural edition of the CAFA U-15 Girls Championship, the international women's football youth championship of Central Asia organized by the Central Asian Football Association (CAFA). For the women's under-15 national teams of Central Asia. Tajikistan was hosting the tournament from 26 to 28 August.

A total of four teams played in the tournament, with players born on or after 1 January 2002 eligible to participate.

Uzbekistan clinched the title after remaining undefeated in all matches.

== Participating teams ==
A total of 4 (out of 6) CAFA member national teams entered the tournament.

Country	App.	Previous best performance
Iran	1st	Debut
Kyrgyzstan	1st	Debut
Tajikistan	1st	Debut
Uzbekistan	1st	Debut

Did not enter

- Afghanistan
- Turkmenistan

== Venues ==
All Matches were held at the Hisor Central Stadium.

Hisor	2017 CAFA U-15 Girls Championship (Tajikistan)
Hisor Central Stadium	2017 CAFA U-15 Girls Championship (Tajikistan)
Capacity: 20,000	2017 CAFA U-15 Girls Championship (Tajikistan)

== Main tournament ==
All times are local, TTJ (UTC+5)

Pos	Team	Pld	W	D	L	GF	GA	GD	Pts	Final result
1	Uzbekistan	3	3	0	0	13	2	+11	9	Champions
2	Iran	3	1	1	1	3	3	0	4	Runners-up
3	Tajikistan (H)	3	1	0	2	4	11	−7	3	Third place
4	Kyrgyzstan	3	0	1	2	0	4	−4	1	

Source: CAFA
Rules for classification: 1) Points; 2) head-to-head matches; 3) Goal difference; 4) Number of goals scored.
(H) Hosts
26 August 2017
18:00

Iran	0–0	Kyrgyzstan
	Report

Hisor Central Stadium, Hisor
26 August 2017
21:00

Tajikistan	2–8	Uzbekistan
	Report	Rashidova ??', ??', ??', ??', ??'; Juraboeva ??'; Bobokulova ??'; Abduganieva ??'

Hisor Central Stadium, Hisor

27 August 2017
17:00

Kyrgyzstan	0–3	Uzbekistan
	Report

Hisor Central Stadium, Hisor
27 August 2017
21:00

Iran	3–1	Tajikistan
	Report

Hisor Central Stadium, Hisor

28 August 2017
18:00

Uzbekistan	2–0	Iran
Rashidova ??'; Juraboeva ??'	Report

Hisor Central Stadium, Hisor
28 August 2017
21:00

Tajikistan	1–0	Kyrgyzstan
	Report

Hisor Central Stadium, Hisor

== Goalscorers ==
There were 20 goals scored in 6 matches, for an average of 3.33 goals per match. Source: CAFA

== Awards ==
=== Champion ===
2017 CAFA U-15 Girls Championship winners

Uzbekistan
First title

=== Individual awards ===
The following awards were given after the conclusion of the tournament.

Top Scorer	Most Valuable Player	Best Goalkeeper
(Uzbekistan) Tojinisokhon Rashidova	(Uzbekistan) Diyora Erkinova	(Iran) Fatemeh Ijadi
