= Markazii Jumhuriyavii Stadium =

Stadium in Dushanbe, Tajikistan

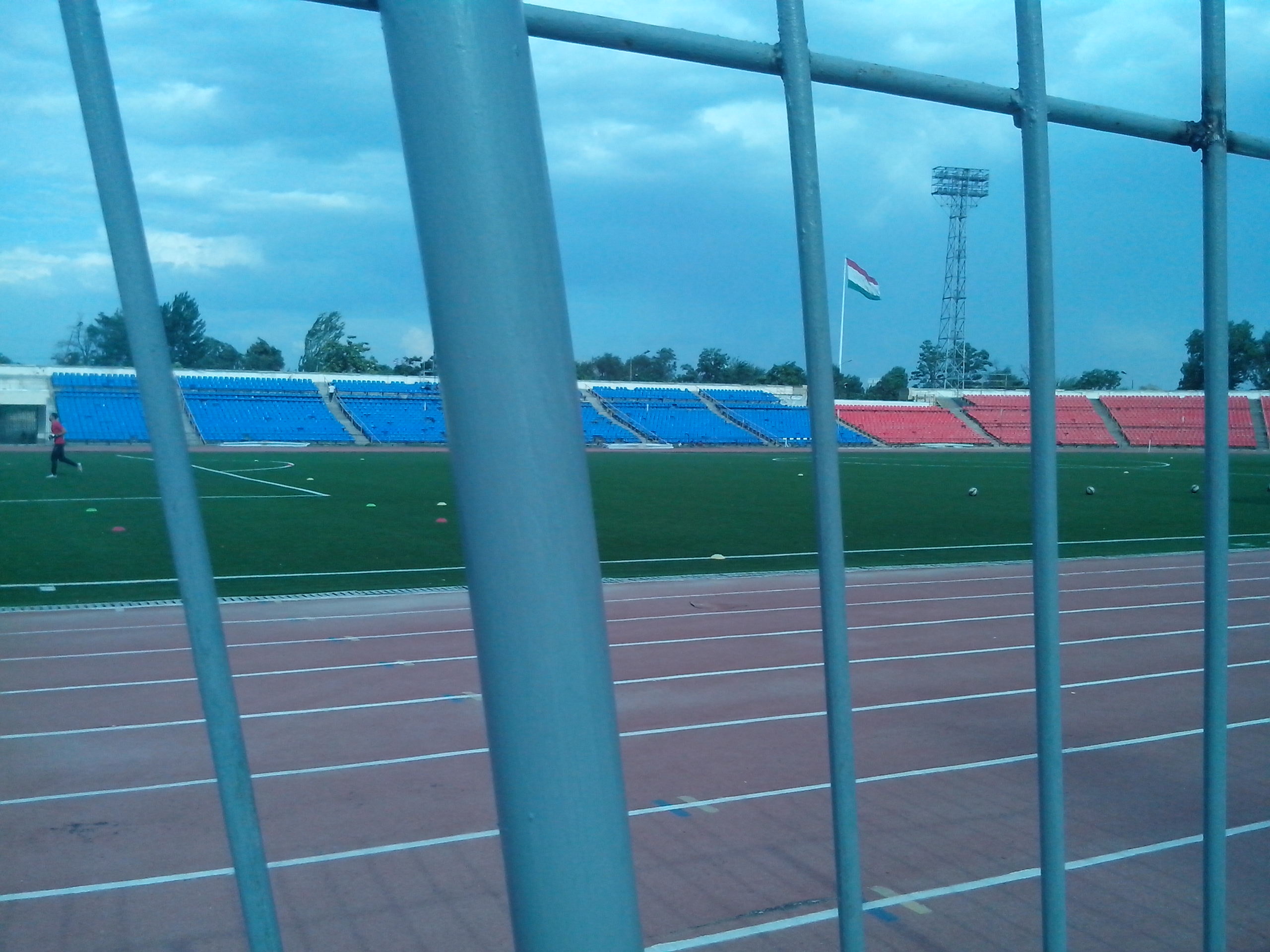
- A view of the stadium
- Interactive map of Markazii Jumhuriyavii Stadium
- Full name: Republican Central Stadium; Варзишгоҳи марказии ҷумҳуриявии
- Location: Dushanbe
- Coordinates: 38°35′9.26″N 68°46′10.24″E
- Capacity: 20,000
- Surface: AstroTurf

Construction
- Built: 1939
- Opened: 1946
- Renovated: 1962, 2007, 2010

Tenants
- Tajikistan national football team Istiklol; CSKA Pamir Dushanbe

The Markazii Jumhuriyavii Stadium (Tajik: Варзишгоҳи марказии ҷумҳуриявии) or Republican Central Stadium, formerly known as Pamir Stadium is a multi-purpose stadium in Dushanbe, Tajikistan. It is currently used mostly for football matches. The stadium currently holds 20,000. It is currently the home ground of the Tajikistan national football team, Istiqlol Dushanbe and CSKA Pamir Dushanbe. It also hosted Afghanistan national football team matches during 2022 World Cup qualification.

It is located next to Dushanbe Zoo.

== History ==
The construction of the Central Stadium of Tajikistan began in 1939 but was halted during the Great Patriotic War. In 1946, construction resumed, and the western stand for 5,000 spectators was built. In 1962, the “Dushanbesokhtmon” trust continued the work and within a year completed the main stadium field for 21,400 spectators, officially opening it for use.

The complex covers more than 20 hectares (as of 2014). The stadium also includes the Republican swimming pool, a handball arena (opened in 1974), and the Tennis Palace (considered one of the best sports palaces in Central Asia). The Firdausi Wrestling Hall was established in 2005.

During preparations for the 5th Central Asian Games, the stadium’s eight-lane track and areas for jumping and throwing (discus, javelin, hammer) were resurfaced with red elastic material. Jumping pits were repaired, new flagpoles installed, and new sports equipment was introduced for competitions.

As of 2014, the stadium had 19,000 seats. The football pitch was renovated in 2012.

The stadium also hosts:

- The Republican School of Higher Sports Mastery in football
- The Republican School of Higher Sports Mastery in athletics
- The Republican School of Higher Sports Mastery in winter sports
- The Republican School of Higher Sports Mastery in applied disciplines
- The city’s youth sports school in athletics
- The “Istiklol” football club
- The Football Federation of Dushanbe

International, city, and national competitions, as well as matches of the capital’s football teams, are held annually at the stadium.

== Architectural summary ==
The sports hall of the stadium is distinguished by its unique architectural character. Designed with a long rectangular form, the structure combines clean geometric lines with graceful curves. Both the roof and the foundation follow a curved profile, creating a dynamic silhouette. Along the length of the hall, where the roofline meets the foundation, narrow strip windows are set in place, allowing light to filter naturally into the interior.

The central wall is fully glazed, further enhancing the flow of daylight and giving the hall a bright, open atmosphere. Above, the dome-shaped roof is insulated with polystyrene foam, balancing structural efficiency with modern materials.

A central entrance provides symmetry and accessibility, while the building’s proportions emphasize both scale and functionality:

- Length: 82 m
- Width: 32 m
- Height: 10.5 m
- Sports area: 1,960 m²

The use of rectangular geometry, curved elements, and use of light and materials makes the stadium hall a functional sports venue and example of mid-20th-century architectural design.
