= 2023 AFC U-20 Asian Cup squads =

International football tournament in Uzbekistan

The 2023 AFC U-20 Asian Cup was an international football tournament that was held in Uzbekistan from 1 to 18 March 2023. The sixteen participating national teams were required to register a squad of a minimum of 18 and a maximum of 23 players, including at least three goalkeepers (Regulations Article 26.3). Only players in these squads are eligible to take part in the tournament. The tournament exclusively requires players to be born between 1 January 2003 and 31 December 2007 to be eligible (Regulations Article 22.1), that is, they must be a maximum of 20 years old and at least 16 years old by the end of the calendar year in which the competition is played.

Each participating national team had to submit a provisional list of a minimum of 18 and a maximum of 50 players (including at least four goalkeepers) to the Asian Football Confederation (AFC), via the AFC Administration System (AFCAS), no later than thirty days prior to its first match of the competition. Up to 5 players could be replaced or added to the provisional list, for any reason, provided that the maximum number of registered players (50) is not exceeded no later than seven days prior to its first match of the competition (Regulations Article 25). The final list of up to 23 players per national team had to be submitted to AFC, via AFCAS, by latest ten days prior to the first match of the tournament. All players in the final list had to be chosen from the respective provisional list. Teams are permitted to replace any player up to 6 hours prior to their first match of the competition. In addition, any player with positive PCR tests for SARS-CoV-2 may be replaced before and during the tournament up to six hours before the next match of the interested national team. The replacement player must come from the provisional list and will be assigned the shirt number of the replaced player (Regulations Article 26.2).

The age listed for each player is on 1 March 2023, the first day of the tournament. A flag is included for coaches who are of a different nationality than their own national team. Players name marked in bold have been capped at full international level.

== Group A ==
=== Uzbekistan ===
Uzbekistan announced a provisional squad of 25 players on 3 February 2023. The final squad of 23 players was announced on 25 February 2023.

Head coach: Ravshan Khaydarov

No.	Pos.	Player	Date of birth (age)	Club
1	GK	Edem Nemanov	25 December 2003 (aged 19)	(Uzbekistan Football Association) Chigatoy
2	DF	Izzatillo Polatov	15 June 2003 (aged 19)	(Uzbekistan Football Association) Metallurg
3	DF	**Abdukodir Khusanov**	29 February 2004 (aged 19)	(Football Federation of Belarus) Energetik-BGU Minsk
4	DF	Abubakir Ashurov	12 June 2003 (aged 19)	(Uzbekistan Football Association) Pakhtakor
5	DF	Javokhir Utamurodov	9 March 2004 (aged 18)	(Uzbekistan Football Association) Nasaf
6	DF	Jakhongir Orozov	18 January 2004 (aged 19)	(Uzbekistan Football Association) Bunyodkor
7	FW	Polatkhoja Kholdorkhonov	6 July 2003 (aged 19)	(Uzbekistan Football Association) Pakhtakor
8	MF	Bekhruz Askarov	8 March 2003 (aged 19)	(Uzbekistan Football Association) Pakhtakor
9	FW	Shakhzodjon Nematjonov	6 August 2003 (aged 19)	(Uzbekistan Football Association) Metallurg
10	MF	Umarali Rakhmonaliev (captain)	18 August 2003 (aged 19)	(Russian Football Union) Rubin Kazan
11	FW	Shakhriyor Jabborov	14 January 2003 (aged 20)	(Uzbekistan Football Association) Pakhtakor
12	GK	Asrorbek Kenjayev	15 July 2004 (aged 18)	(Uzbekistan Football Association) Neftchi
13	DF	**Zafarmurod Abdurakhmatov**	28 April 2003 (aged 19)	(Uzbekistan Football Association) Nasaf
14	MF	**Abbosbek Fayzullaev**	3 October 2003 (aged 19)	(Uzbekistan Football Association) Pakhtakor
15	DF	Diyorbek Ortiqboyev	6 January 2003 (aged 20)	(Uzbekistan Football Association) Pakhtakor
16	MF	Shakhzodbek Rahmatullayev	7 May 2003 (aged 19)	(Uzbekistan Football Association) Pakhtakor
17	MF	Nodir Abdurazzakov	27 May 2004 (aged 18)	(Uzbekistan Football Association) AGMK
18	DF	Saidafzalkhon Akhrorov	20 January 2003 (aged 20)	(Uzbekistan Football Association) Turon Yaypan
19	MF	Shakhzod Akramov	7 February 2004 (aged 19)	(Uzbekistan Football Association) Nasaf
20	DF	Makhmudjon Makhamadjonov	30 June 2003 (aged 19)	(Uzbekistan Football Association) Bunyodkor
21	GK	Otabek Boymurodov	5 June 2003 (aged 19)	(Uzbekistan Football Association) Pakhtakor
22	MF	Sherzod Esanov	1 February 2003 (aged 20)	(Uzbekistan Football Association) Andijon
23	FW	Asadbek Juraboyev	17 February 2004 (aged 19)	(Uzbekistan Football Association) Navbahor

=== Indonesia ===
Indonesia announced a provisional squad of 30 players on 27 January 2023. The final squad of 23 players was announced on 23 February 2023. Zanadin Fariz withdrew injured on 1 March 2023 and was replaced by Brandon Scheunemann.

Head coach: (South Korea) Shin Tae-yong

No.	Pos.	Player	Date of birth (age)	Club
1	GK	**Cahya Supriadi**	11 February 2003 (aged 20)	(Football Association of Indonesia) Persija Jakarta
2	DF	Sulthan Zaky	23 March 2006 (aged 16)	(Football Association of Indonesia) PSM Makassar
3	DF	Marcell Januar	20 January 2004 (aged 19)	(Football Association of Indonesia) Persis Solo
4	DF	**Muhammad Ferarri** (captain)	21 June 2003 (aged 19)	(Football Association of Indonesia) Persija Jakarta
5	DF	**Kakang Rudianto**	2 February 2003 (aged 20)	(Football Association of Indonesia) Persib Bandung
6	DF	Brandon Scheunemann	9 March 2005 (aged 17)	(Football Association of Indonesia) PSIS Semarang
7	MF	Ferdiansyah Cecep	15 July 2003 (aged 19)	(Football Association of Indonesia) Persib Bandung
8	MF	**Arkhan Fikri**	28 December 2004 (aged 18)	(Football Association of Indonesia) Arema
9	FW	**Hokky Caraka**	21 August 2004 (aged 18)	(Football Association of Indonesia) PSS Sleman
10	FW	**Ronaldo Kwateh**	19 October 2004 (aged 18)	(Turkish Football Federation) Bodrumspor
11	MF	Resa Aditya	6 March 2004 (aged 18)	(Football Association of Indonesia) Persija Jakarta
12	MF	**Achmad Maulana**	24 April 2003 (aged 19)	(Football Association of Indonesia) Persija Jakarta
13	DF	Dimas Pamungkas	31 July 2004 (aged 18)	(Football Association of Indonesia) Bhayangkara
14	DF	**Robi Darwis**	22 August 2003 (aged 19)	(Football Association of Indonesia) Persib Bandung
15	MF	Dzaky Asraf	6 February 2003 (aged 20)	(Football Association of Indonesia) PSM Makassar
16	MF	**Dony Tri Pamungkas**	11 January 2005 (aged 18)	(Football Association of Indonesia) Persija Jakarta
17	DF	Frengky Missa	20 February 2004 (aged 19)	(Football Association of Indonesia) Persija Jakarta
18	MF	**Alfriyanto Nico**	3 April 2003 (aged 19)	(Football Association of Indonesia) Persija Jakarta
19	FW	Rabbani Tasnim	26 May 2003 (aged 19)	(Football Association of Indonesia) Borneo Samarinda
20	FW	Ginanjar Wahyu	20 November 2003 (aged 19)	(Football Association of Indonesia) Persija Jakarta
21	FW	Hugo Samir	25 January 2005 (aged 18)	(Football Association of Indonesia) Persis Solo
22	GK	**Daffa Fasya**	7 May 2004 (aged 18)	(Football Association of Indonesia) Borneo Samarinda
23	GK	Aditya Arya	21 April 2004 (aged 18)	(Football Association of Indonesia) Persebaya Surabaya

=== Iraq ===
Iraq announced their final squad of 23 players on 7 February 2023. Goalkeeper Ridha Abdulaziz was replaced by Omran Zaki.

Head coach: Emad Mohammed

No.	Pos.	Player	Date of birth (age)	Club
1	GK	Abbas Kareem	15 November 2003 (aged 19)	(Iraq Football Association) Al-Shorta
2	DF	Sajad Fadhil	5 May 2004 (aged 18)	(Iraq Football Association) Al-Zawra'a
3	DF	Ali Abbas Mohesin	14 February 2004 (aged 19)	(Iraq Football Association) Amanat Baghdad
4	DF	Kadhim Raad	5 March 2003 (aged 19)	(Iraq Football Association) Al-Quwa Al-Jawiya
5	MF	Abdul-Razzaq Qasim (captain)	19 February 2003 (aged 20)	(Iraq Football Association) Al-Shorta
6	DF	Adam Rasheed	7 July 2006 (aged 16)	(Danish Football Association) AaB
7	FW	Mohammed Jameel	25 November 2005 (aged 17)	(Iraq Football Association) Al-Sinaat Al-Kahrabaiya
8	MF	Ismail Ahmed	4 March 2003 (aged 19)	(Iraq Football Association) Newroz
9	FW	Mustafa Qabeel	8 January 2005 (aged 18)	(Iraq Football Association) Erbil
10	FW	Abdulqader Ayoub	23 July 2003 (aged 19)	(Iraq Football Association) Erbil
11	FW	Ashar Ali	24 September 2003 (aged 19)	(Iraq Football Association) Al-Mina'a
12	GK	Omran Zaki	2 August 2004 (aged 18)	(Iraq Football Association) Zakho
13	MF	Abbas Majed	29 October 2003 (aged 19)	(Iraq Football Association) Al-Talaba
14	FW	Abbas Fadhil	13 July 2003 (aged 19)	(Iraq Football Association) Naft Maysan
15	DF	Abbas Manie	11 January 2003 (aged 20)	(Iraq Football Association) Amanat Baghdad
16	MF	**Ali Jassim**	20 January 2004 (aged 19)	(Iraq Football Association) Al-Kahrabaa
17	DF	Muslim Mousa	11 March 2005 (aged 17)	(Iraq Football Association) Al-Mina'a
18	MF	Ali Sadiq	13 February 2003 (aged 20)	(Iraq Football Association) Al-Zawra'a
19	DF	Sajad Mahdi	25 February 2003 (aged 20)	(Iraq Football Association) Naft Maysan
20	FW	Charbel Shamoon	10 February 2004 (aged 19)	(Football Australia) Western United
21	MF	Hayder Abdulkareem	7 August 2004 (aged 18)	(Iraq Football Association) Al-Zawra'a
22	GK	Hussein Hassan	5 October 2003 (aged 19)	(Iraq Football Association) Al-Karkh
23	FW	Abboud Rabah	25 May 2003 (aged 19)	(Iraq Football Association) Al-Qasim

=== Syria ===
Syria announced their final squad of 23 players on 25 February 2023.

Head coach: (Netherlands) Mark Wotte

No.	Pos.	Player	Date of birth (age)	Club
1	GK	Maksim Sarraf	15 March 2005 (aged 17)	(Russian Football Union) CSKA Moscow
2	DF	Ammar Al Maa	1 June 2003 (aged 19)	(Syrian Football Association) Al-Wathba
3	DF	Khaled Al Hejjeh	22 May 2004 (aged 18)	(Syrian Football Association) Hutteen
4	DF	Ali Al Rina	10 January 2004 (aged 19)	(Syrian Football Association) Al-Ittihad
5	MF	Amer Al Fayad	1 May 2004 (aged 18)	(Syrian Football Association) Al-Ittihad
6	MF	Malek Janeer (captain)	1 January 2003 (aged 20)	(United Arab Emirates Football Association) Al Wasl
7	FW	**Hozan Osman**	16 May 2003 (aged 19)	(Royal Dutch Football Association) De Graafschap
8	DF	Mahmoud Nayef	3 January 2004 (aged 19)	(Syrian Football Association) Al-Ittihad
9	FW	Zakaria Al Ramadan	1 January 2005 (aged 18)	(Syrian Football Association) Al-Ittihad
10	FW	**Mahmoud Al Aswad**	14 September 2003 (aged 19)	(Syrian Football Association) Al-Karamah
11	MF	Elias Safar	19 November 2003 (aged 19)	(Swedish Football Association) Järfälla
12	FW	Mahmoud M'Hanna	28 May 2003 (aged 19)	(Syrian Football Association) Jableh
13	DF	Anas Al Hardan	3 January 2005 (aged 18)	(Danish Football Association) AaB
14	DF	Ahmad Al Mekdad	12 January 2004 (aged 19)	(Syrian Football Association) Jableh
15	DF	Mohammad Othman	10 January 2004 (aged 19)	(Syrian Football Association) Al-Wahda
16	MF	Abdallah Zakreet	3 January 2003 (aged 20)	(Syrian Football Association) Al-Karamah
17	MF	Mustafa Hamo	20 February 2003 (aged 20)	(Syrian Football Association) Al-Wahda
18	MF	Hasan Dahhan	5 January 2003 (aged 20)	(Syrian Football Association) Al-Ittihad
19	FW	Muhannad Fadel	4 January 2003 (aged 20)	(Syrian Football Association) Al-Karamah
20	MF	Mustafa Abdullatif	15 December 2003 (aged 19)	(German Football Association) Hertha BSC
21	FW	Mohammad Asaad	21 September 2003 (aged 19)	(Syrian Football Association) Tishreen
22	GK	Mohamad Hassouni	7 January 2004 (aged 19)	(Syrian Football Association) Al-Ittihad
23	GK	Ali Holou	20 August 2003 (aged 19)	(Syrian Football Association) Al-Wathba

== Group B ==
=== Qatar ===
Qatar announced their final squad of 23 players on 27 February 2023.

Head coach: (Spain) Iñaki González

No.	Pos.	Player	Date of birth (age)	Club
1	GK	Amir Hassan	22 April 2004 (aged 18)	(Qatar Football Association) Al-Arabi
2	DF	Chalpan Abdullah	26 June 2003 (aged 19)	(Royal Belgian Football Association) Eupen
3	DF	Mohammed Mansour	15 July 2003 (aged 19)	(Qatar Football Association) Al-Gharafa
4	DF	**Hashemi Al-Hussain**	15 August 2003 (aged 19)	(Qatar Football Association) Al-Arabi
5	DF	Hassan Al-Ghareeb (captain)	22 May 2004 (aged 18)	(Royal Spanish Football Federation) Cultural Leonesa
6	MF	Mostafa Essam	20 May 2003 (aged 19)	(Royal Spanish Football Federation) Cultural Leonesa
7	FW	**Mubarak Shanan**	20 February 2004 (aged 19)	(Royal Spanish Football Federation) Cultural Leonesa
8	MF	**Ibrahim Al-Hassan**	26 October 2005 (aged 17)	(Qatar Football Association) Al-Rayyan
9	FW	Rashid Al-Abdulla	21 February 2004 (aged 19)	(Royal Spanish Football Federation) Alcorcón
10	MF	Jassem Al-Sharshani	2 January 2003 (aged 20)	(Qatar Football Association) Al Ahli
11	FW	**Ahmed Al-Rawi**	30 May 2004 (aged 18)	(Royal Spanish Football Federation) Alcorcón
12	DF	Yousef Al-Khatib	4 August 2004 (aged 18)	(Qatar Football Association) Al-Wakrah
13	DF	Ahmed Reyad	28 September 2003 (aged 19)	(Qatar Football Association) Al-Duhail
14	DF	Younis Bala	5 January 2005 (aged 18)	(Qatar Football Association) Al-Duhail
15	MF	**Mahdi Salem**	4 April 2004 (aged 18)	(Qatar Football Association) Al Sadd
16	MF	**Nabil Irfan**	7 February 2004 (aged 19)	(Qatar Football Association) Al-Wakrah
17	FW	Moustafa Asar	26 August 2004 (aged 18)	(Qatar Football Association) Al-Rayyan
18	MF	Awab El-Awad	2 February 2004 (aged 19)	(Qatar Football Association) Al-Sailiya
19	DF	Ayoub Al-Oui	11 March 2005 (aged 17)	(Qatar Football Association) Al-Gharafa
20	FW	**Mohamed Khaled Gouda**	26 January 2005 (aged 18)	(Qatar Football Association) Al-Arabi
21	GK	Sami Mazen	5 January 2004 (aged 19)	(Qatar Football Association) Al-Rayyan
22	GK	Ali Mohammed	17 May 2003 (aged 19)	(Qatar Football Association) Al-Duhail
23	DF	Saifeldeen Hassan	31 March 2003 (aged 19)	(Qatar Football Association) Al-Gharafa

=== Australia ===
Australia announced their squad of 23 players on 7 February 2023.

Head coach: (Australia) Trevor Morgan

No.	Pos.	Player	Date of birth (age)	Club
1	GK	Jack Warshawsky	8 August 2004 (aged 18)	(Football Australia) Western Sydney Wanderers
2	DF	Joshua Rawlins (captain)	23 April 2004 (aged 18)	(Royal Dutch Football Association) Utrecht
3	MF	Nectarios Triantis	11 May 2003 (aged 19)	(Football Australia) Central Coast Mariners
4	MF	Chris Donnell	24 January 2004 (aged 19)	(Football Australia) Perth Glory
5	DF	Matt Dench	8 December 2003 (aged 19)	(The Football Association) Charlton Athletic
6	MF	Rhys Bozinovski	7 March 2004 (aged 18)	(Football Australia) Western United
7	FW	Bernardo Oliveira	16 March 2004 (aged 18)	(Football Australia) Adelaide United
8	MF	Alessandro Lopane	9 April 2004 (aged 18)	(Football Australia) Western Sydney Wanderers
9	FW	Gabriel Popovic	28 July 2003 (aged 19)	(Croatian Football Federation) Rudeš
10	FW	Adrian Segecic	1 June 2004 (aged 18)	(Football Australia) Sydney FC
11	FW	Raphael Borges Rodrigues	11 September 2003 (aged 19)	(Football Australia) Melbourne City
12	GK	James Nieuwenhuizen	17 January 2004 (aged 19)	(Football Australia) Melbourne City
13	DF	Panashe Madanha	5 August 2004 (aged 18)	(Football Australia) Adelaide United
14	DF	Kaelan Majekodunmi	21 February 2004 (aged 19)	(Football Australia) Perth Glory
15	DF	Joseph Forde	28 December 2003 (aged 19)	(Football Australia) Perth Glory
16	DF	Jake Girdwood-Reich	26 May 2004 (aged 18)	(Football Australia) Sydney FC
17	DF	Aidan Simmons	26 May 2003 (aged 19)	(Football Australia) Western Sydney Wanderers
18	GK	Alex Robinson	9 March 2005 (aged 17)	(Football Australia) Macarthur FC
19	FW	Archie Goodwin	7 November 2004 (aged 18)	(Football Australia) Newcastle Jets
20	MF	Alexander Badolato	23 February 2005 (aged 18)	(Football Australia) Western Sydney Wanderers
21	FW	Jed Drew	29 August 2003 (aged 19)	(Football Australia) Macarthur FC
22	FW	Jing Reec	12 June 2003 (aged 19)	(Danish Football Association) AGF
23	MF	Jonny Yull	5 March 2005 (aged 17)	(Football Australia) Adelaide United

=== Vietnam ===
Vietnam announced a provisional squad of 30 players on 14 February 2023. The final squad of 23 players was announced on 25 February 2023.

Head coach: Hoàng Anh Tuấn

No.	Pos.	Player	Date of birth (age)	Club
1	GK	Cao Văn Bình	8 January 2005 (aged 18)	(Vietnam Football Federation) Sông Lam Nghệ An
2	DF	Nguyễn Mạnh Hưng	8 August 2005 (aged 17)	(Vietnam Football Federation) Viettel
3	DF	**Hồ Văn Cường**	15 January 2003 (aged 20)	(Vietnam Football Federation) Sông Lam Nghệ An
4	DF	Nguyễn Đức Anh	16 May 2003 (aged 19)	(Vietnam Football Federation) Hà Nội
5	DF	Lê Nguyên Hoàng	14 February 2005 (aged 18)	(Vietnam Football Federation) Sông Lam Nghệ An
6	MF	Nguyễn Đức Phú	13 January 2003 (aged 20)	(Vietnam Football Federation) PVF-CAND
7	MF	Nguyễn Đức Việt	1 January 2004 (aged 19)	(Vietnam Football Federation) Hoàng Anh Gia Lai
8	MF	**Nguyễn Văn Trường**	10 September 2003 (aged 19)	(Vietnam Football Federation) Hà Nội
9	FW	**Nguyễn Thanh Nhàn**	28 July 2003 (aged 19)	(Vietnam Football Federation) PVF-CAND
10	MF	**Khuất Văn Khang** (captain)	11 May 2003 (aged 19)	(Vietnam Football Federation) Viettel
11	FW	**Bùi Vĩ Hào**	24 February 2003 (aged 20)	(Vietnam Football Federation) Becamex Bình Dương
12	FW	Hoàng Minh Tiến	23 March 2005 (age 21)	(Vietnam Football Federation) Hoàng Anh Gia Lai
13	DF	Mai Quốc Tú	10 July 2005 (aged 17)	(Vietnam Football Federation) SHB Đà Nẵng
14	FW	Nguyễn Quốc Việt	4 May 2003 (aged 19)	(Vietnam Football Federation) Hoàng Anh Gia Lai
15	FW	**Nguyễn Đình Bắc**	19 August 2004 (aged 18)	(Vietnam Football Federation) Quảng Nam
16	DF	Nguyễn Hồng Phúc	31 May 2003 (aged 19)	(Vietnam Football Federation) Viettel
17	DF	Nguyễn Bảo Long	23 August 2005 (age 21)	(Vietnam Football Federation) PVF Football Academy
18	DF	Lê Văn Hà	1 July 2004 (aged 18)	(Vietnam Football Federation) Hà Nội
19	MF	Thái Bá Đạt	23 March 2005 (aged 17)	(Vietnam Football Federation) PVF Football Academy
20	MF	Trần Nam Hải	5 February 2004 (aged 19)	(Vietnam Football Federation) Sông Lam Nghệ An
21	MF	Đinh Xuân Tiến	10 January 2003 (aged 20)	(Vietnam Football Federation) Sông Lam Nghệ An
22	GK	Nguyễn Quang Trường	4 July 2004 (aged 18)	(Vietnam Football Federation) PVF Football Academy
23	GK	Nguyễn Tiến Mạnh	20 January 2003 (aged 20)	(Vietnam Football Federation) Quảng Nam

=== Iran ===
Iran announced their provisional squad of 50 players on 8 February 2023.

Head coach: Samad Marfavi

No.	Pos.	Player	Date of birth (age)	Club
1	GK	**Mohammad Khalifeh**	19 August 2004 (aged 18)	(Football Federation Islamic Republic of Iran) Persepolis
2	DF	Aliakbar Ranjbar	2 February 2004 (aged 19)	(Football Federation Islamic Republic of Iran) Paykan
3	DF	Mersad Seifi	11 August 2003 (aged 19)	(Football Federation Islamic Republic of Iran) Nassaji Mazandaran
4	MF	Mohammadreza Torabi	18 July 2004 (aged 18)	(Football Federation Islamic Republic of Iran) Esteghlal
5	DF	**Amin Hazbavi** (captain)	6 May 2003 (aged 19)	(Football Federation Islamic Republic of Iran) Foolad
6	DF	Milad Kor	9 October 2003 (aged 19)	(Football Federation Islamic Republic of Iran) Tractor
7	FW	Amir Ebrahimzadeh	31 January 2004 (aged 19)	(Football Federation Islamic Republic of Iran) Tractor
8	MF	Alireza Enayatzadeh	5 April 2004 (aged 18)	(Football Federation Islamic Republic of Iran) Persepolis
9	FW	**Saeid Saharkhizan**	26 June 2003 (aged 19)	(Football Federation Islamic Republic of Iran) Havadar
10	MF	Farhad Zavoshi	8 February 2003 (aged 20)	(Football Federation Islamic Republic of Iran) Havadar
11	MF	Amirreza Eslamtalab	30 January 2003 (aged 20)	(Football Federation Islamic Republic of Iran) KIA Football Academy
12	GK	Adib Zarei	16 April 2003 (aged 19)	(Football Federation Islamic Republic of Iran) Shahin
13	DF	Mehran Feizabadi	8 July 2003 (aged 19)	(Football Federation Islamic Republic of Iran) Esteghlal
14	MF	Erfan Ghorbani	27 January 2003 (aged 20)	(Football Federation Islamic Republic of Iran) KIA Football Academy
15	DF	Amin Pilali	7 January 2003 (aged 20)	(Football Federation Islamic Republic of Iran) KIA Football Academy
16	MF	**Javad Hosseinnejad**	26 June 2003 (aged 19)	(Football Federation Islamic Republic of Iran) Sepahan
17	MF	Mojtaba Fakhrian	15 May 2003 (aged 19)	(Football Federation Islamic Republic of Iran) Aluminium Arak
18	DF	**Danial Iri**	26 October 2003 (aged 19)	(Football Federation Islamic Republic of Iran) Zob Ahan Esfahan
19	MF	Alireza Safari	2 December 2003 (aged 19)	(Football Federation Islamic Republic of Iran) Saipa
20	FW	Hossein Hajizadeh	8 March 2003 (aged 19)	(Football Federation Islamic Republic of Iran) Persepolis
21	MF	Mohammadreza Bordbar	26 August 2004 (aged 18)	(Football Federation Islamic Republic of Iran) Malavan
22	GK	Sadegh Salehi	30 March 2004 (aged 18)	(Football Federation Islamic Republic of Iran) Sepahan
23	FW	Selim Toomaj	9 January 2005 (aged 18)	(Turkish Football Federation) Fenerbahçe

== Group C ==
=== South Korea ===
South Korea announced a provisional squad of 26 players on 11 February 2023. The final squad of 23 players was announced on 21 February 2023.

Head coach: Kim Eun-jung

No.	Pos.	Player	Date of birth (age)	Club
1	GK	Kim Jun-hong	3 June 2003 (aged 19)	(Korea Football Association) Gimcheon Sangmu
2	DF	Park Chang-woo	1 March 2003 (aged 20)	(Korea Football Association) Jeonbuk Hyundai Motors
3	DF	Hwang In-taek	1 April 2003 (aged 19)	(Korea Football Association) Seoul E-Land
4	DF	Choi Seok-hyun	13 January 2003 (aged 20)	(Korea Football Association) Dankook University
5	MF	Park Hyun-bin	19 May 2003 (aged 19)	(Korea Football Association) Incheon United
6	DF	Bae Seo-joon	11 December 2003 (aged 19)	(Korea Football Association) Daejeon Hana Citizen
7	FW	Kim Yong-hak	20 May 2003 (aged 19)	(Portuguese Football Federation) Portimonense
8	MF	Lee Seung-won (captain)	6 March 2003 (aged 19)	(Korea Football Association) Gangwon FC
9	FW	Lee Young-jun	23 May 2003 (aged 19)	(Korea Football Association) Gimcheon Sangmu
10	FW	**Bae Jun-ho**	21 August 2003 (aged 19)	(Korea Football Association) Daejeon Hana Citizen
11	FW	**Kang Seong-jin**	26 March 2003 (aged 19)	(Korea Football Association) FC Seoul
12	DF	Cho Young-kwang	11 March 2004 (aged 18)	(Korea Football Association) FC Seoul
13	DF	Lee Jun-jae	14 July 2003 (aged 19)	(Korea Football Association) Gyeongnam FC
14	MF	Kang Sang-yoon	31 May 2004 (aged 18)	(Korea Football Association) Jeonbuk Hyundai Motors
15	DF	Park Jun-young	18 June 2003 (aged 19)	(Korea Football Association) Seoul E-Land
16	MF	Kim Gyeong-hwan	8 April 2003 (aged 19)	(Korea Football Association) Daejeon Hana Citizen
17	FW	Lee Jun-sang	19 November 2003 (aged 19)	(Korea Football Association) Seongnam FC
18	FW	Sung Jin-young	21 March 2003 (aged 19)	(Korea Football Association) Korea University
19	MF	Kim Hee-seung	19 January 2003 (aged 20)	(Korea Football Association) Daegu FC
20	DF	Kim Ji-soo	24 December 2004 (aged 18)	(Korea Football Association) Seongnam FC
21	GK	Moon Hyun-ho	13 May 2003 (aged 19)	(Korea Football Association) Chungnam Asan
22	FW	Moon Seung-min	20 January 2003 (aged 20)	(Korea Football Association) Jeonju University
23	GK	Kim Jung-hun	8 September 2004 (aged 18)	(Korea Football Association) Korea University

=== Tajikistan ===
Tajikistan announced a provisional squad of 26 players on 11 February 2023. The final squad of 23 players was announced on 21 February 2023.

Head coach: (Belarus) Oleg Kubarev

No.	Pos.	Player	Date of birth (age)	Club
1	GK	Safarmad Ghaforov	14 April 2004 (aged 18)	(Tajikistan Football Federation) Khatlon
2	DF	**Fakhriddin Akhtamov**	26 November 2004 (aged 18)	(Tajikistan Football Federation) Khujand
3	DF	**Rakhmatsho Rakhmatzoda**	6 April 2004 (aged 18)	(Tajikistan Football Federation) Khosilot Farkhor
4	DF	Mehrubon Gafforzoda	15 February 2004 (aged 19)	(Tajikistan Football Federation) Ravshan Kulob
5	DF	**Sodikjon Kurbonov**	19 January 2003 (aged 20)	(Tajikistan Football Federation) Istiklol
6	MF	Azizbek Khaitov	6 April 2003 (aged 19)	(Tajikistan Football Federation) Khujand
7	MF	Salam Ashurmamadov	18 March 2003 (aged 19)	(Portuguese Football Federation) Dumiense FC/CJPII
8	MF	Khamzadzhon Akhtamov	29 May 2003 (aged 19)	(Tajikistan Football Federation) Istaravshan
9	FW	Abdulfatohi Khudoidodzoda	15 July 2004 (aged 18)	(Tajikistan Football Federation) Dynamo Dushanbe
10	FW	Sunatullo Azizov	3 August 2004 (aged 18)	(Tajikistan Football Federation) Khatlon
11	DF	Shakhriyori Inoyatullo	17 January 2004 (aged 19)	(Tajikistan Football Federation) Ravshan Kulob
12	MF	Kabir Salimshoev	1 August 2004 (aged 18)	(Tajikistan Football Federation) Dynamo Dushanbe
13	MF	**Amadoni Kamolov**	16 January 2003 (aged 20)	(Tajikistan Football Federation) Istiklol
14	MF	**Salokhiddin Irgashev**	3 July 2003 (aged 19)	(Tajikistan Football Federation) Istiklol
15	DF	**Mekhrubon Karimov**	19 January 2004 (aged 19)	(Georgian Football Federation) Samgurali Tsqaltubo
16	GK	Shakhobiddin Makhmudzoda	5 January 2005 (aged 18)	(Tajikistan Football Federation) Dynamo Dushanbe
17	MF	**Alidzhoni Ayni**	6 August 2004 (aged 18)	(Tajikistan Football Federation) Istiklol
18	MF	Abdullo Sharipov	3 May 2004 (aged 18)	(Tajikistan Football Federation) CSKA Pamir
19	DF	Asadbek Ziyozoda	2 February 2003 (aged 20)	(Tajikistan Football Federation) Istaravshan
20	FW	**Daler Sharipov**	13 February 2004 (aged 19)	(Uzbekistan Football Association) Metallurg
21	FW	Faridun Davlatov	12 February 2004 (aged 19)	(Tajikistan Football Federation) Regar-TadAZ
22	MF	**Fatkhullo Olimzoda**	3 August 2005 (aged 17)	(Tajikistan Football Federation) Ravshan Kulob
23	GK	Suhrobkhuja Yusupov	22 October 2004 (aged 18)	(Tajikistan Football Federation) Khujand

=== Jordan ===
Jordan announced their final squad of 23 players on 22 February 2023.

Head coach: Islam Al-Diabat

No.	Pos.	Player	Date of birth (age)	Club
1	GK	Murad Al-Faluji	27 December 2003 (aged 19)	(Jordan Football Association) Al-Wehdat
2	DF	Arafat Al-Haj	17 April 2003 (aged 19)	(Jordan Football Association) Al-Wehdat
3	DF	Asim Abu Al-Teen	25 August 2003 (aged 19)	(Jordan Football Association) Al-Hussein
4	DF	Youssef Hassan	2 February 2003 (aged 20)	(Jordan Football Association) Al-Hussein
5	MF	Hashem Al-Mubaidin	24 December 2003 (aged 19)	(Jordan Football Association) Al-Jazeera
6	MF	Mohammad Kahlan	2 April 2003 (aged 19)	(Jordan Football Association) Al-Wehdat
7	FW	Adham Al-Refaei	7 June 2004 (aged 18)	(Jordan Football Association) Al-Faisaly
8	MF	Mohammad Abdulaziz	26 August 2003 (aged 19)	(Jordan Football Association) Al-Wehdat
9	FW	Baker Kalbouneh	13 August 2003 (aged 19)	(Jordan Football Association) Al-Jazeera
10	MF	**Mohannad Abu Taha** (captain)	2 February 2003 (aged 20)	(Jordan Football Association) Al-Wehdat
11	MF	Seifaddeen Darwish	5 May 2003 (aged 19)	(Jordan Football Association) Al-Hussein
12	GK	Abdel Rahman Al-Talalga	12 April 2003 (aged 19)	(Jordan Football Association) Al-Faisaly
13	MF	Omar Salah	18 April 2003 (aged 19)	(Jordan Football Association) Al-Wehdat
14	DF	Zakaria Amro	26 June 2003 (aged 19)	(Swedish Football Association) Mjällby AIF
15	DF	Suhib Al-Qadi	22 January 2004 (aged 19)	(Jordan Football Association) Al-Wehdat
16	DF	Alaa Dayyeh	4 May 2003 (aged 19)	(Jordan Football Association) Al-Wehdat
17	MF	Mo'ath Al-Elaimat	28 August 2004 (aged 18)	(Jordan Football Association) Shabab Al-Ordon
18	FW	Sultan Al-Sheyab	22 February 2003 (aged 20)	(Jordan Football Association) Al-Hussein
19	FW	Zaid Al-Asfar	22 February 2003 (aged 20)	(Norwegian Football Federation) Hønefoss
20	FW	Ali Azaizeh	13 April 2004 (aged 18)	(Jordan Football Association) Al-Ramtha
21	DF	Ali Hajabi	2 May 2004 (aged 18)	(Jordan Football Association) Al-Ahli
22	GK	Rajaei Ardakani	11 January 2003 (aged 20)	(Royal Belgian Football Association) Beerschot
23	DF	Ahmad Ayman	24 November 2004 (aged 18)	(Jordan Football Association) Shabab Al-Ordon

=== Oman ===
Oman announced their final squad of 23 players on 22 February 2023.

Head coach: (Spain) David Gordo

No.	Pos.	Player	Date of birth (age)	Club
1	GK	Mazin Saleh	29 January 2003 (aged 20)	(Oman Football Association) Muscat
2	DF	Ayman Al-Nabhani	27 July 2003 (aged 19)	(Oman Football Association) Al-Hamra
3	DF	Said Al-Ghanboosi	4 February 2005 (aged 18)	(Oman Football Association) Al-Orouba
4	DF	Turki Bait Rabia	1 April 2004 (aged 18)	(Oman Football Association) Al-Ittihad
5	DF	Salim Al-Abdali (captain)	14 February 2004 (aged 19)	(Oman Football Association) Al-Seeb
6	MF	Ali Al-Bulushi	2 May 2004 (aged 18)	(Oman Football Association) Oman
7	MF	Moatasim Al-Samin	23 May 2004 (aged 18)	(Oman Football Association) Dhofar
8	MF	Mohammed Al-Aufi	13 October 2003 (aged 19)	(Oman Football Association) Al-Hamra
9	FW	Khalid Al-Sulaimi	13 September 2003 (aged 19)	(Royal Spanish Football Federation) Celta de Vigo
10	MF	Abdulmageed Al-Balushi	15 January 2004 (aged 19)	(Oman Football Association) Oman
11	FW	Mamoon Al-Araimi	22 July 2004 (aged 18)	(Oman Football Association) Al-Orouba
12	GK	Muhtadi Al-Abri	19 September 2003 (aged 19)	(Oman Football Association) Bahla
13	DF	Usama Al-Mahruqi	7 March 2003 (aged 19)	(Oman Football Association) Al-Seeb
14	DF	Jabran Al-Amri	23 August 2004 (aged 18)	(Oman Football Association) Bawshar
15	MF	Sultan Al-Marzouq	23 October 2004 (aged 18)	(Oman Football Association) Dhofar
16	DF	Abdullah Al-Afifi	3 August 2003 (aged 19)	(Oman Football Association) Al-Hamra
17	FW	Abdallah Al-Rajhi	1 April 2003 (aged 19)	(Oman Football Association) Bawshar
18	MF	Mohammed Bait Subea	9 November 2004 (aged 18)	(Oman Football Association) Al-Nasr
19	FW	Salah Al-Jadeedi	26 February 2003 (aged 20)	(Oman Football Association) Al-Hamra
20	MF	Nasser Al-Saqri	9 February 2004 (aged 19)	(Royal Spanish Football Federation) Celta de Vigo
21	MF	Ahad Al-Mashaikhi	30 May 2003 (aged 19)	(Oman Football Association) Muscat
22	GK	Usama Al-Rawahi	9 March 2003 (aged 19)	(Oman Football Association) Al-Seeb
23	DF	Musab Al-Shamsi	19 September 2003 (aged 19)	(Oman Football Association) Fanja

== Group D ==
=== Saudi Arabia ===
Saudi Arabia announced a provisional squad of 26 players on 13 February 2023. The final squad of 23 players was announced on 27 February 2023.

Head coach: Saleh Al-Mohammadi

No.	Pos.	Player	Date of birth (age)	Club
1	GK	Muhannad Al-Yahya	19 September 2004 (aged 18)	(Saudi Arabian Football Federation) Al-Fateh
2	DF	Ahmed Al-Julaydan	8 March 2004 (aged 18)	(Saudi Arabian Football Federation) Al-Fateh
3	DF	Mohammed Al-Dossari	31 March 2003 (aged 19)	(Saudi Arabian Football Federation) Al-Ettifaq
4	DF	Mohammed Sulaiman	8 April 2004 (aged 18)	(Saudi Arabian Football Federation) Al-Ahli
5	DF	Mohammed Barnawi	7 August 2005 (aged 17)	(Saudi Arabian Football Federation) Al-Hilal
6	MF	Faisal Al-Subiani	7 July 2003 (aged 19)	(Saudi Arabian Football Federation) Al-Ahli
7	MF	Abdulaziz Al-Aliwa	11 February 2004 (aged 19)	(Saudi Arabian Football Federation) Al-Nassr
8	MF	Abdullah Al-Zaid	8 January 2004 (aged 19)	(Saudi Arabian Football Federation) Al-Hilal
9	FW	**Abdullah Radif**	20 January 2003 (aged 20)	(Saudi Arabian Football Federation) Al-Taawoun
10	MF	**Musab Al-Juwayr** (captain)	20 June 2003 (aged 19)	(Saudi Arabian Football Federation) Al-Hilal
11	MF	Yaseen Al-Zubaidi	26 April 2003 (aged 19)	(Saudi Arabian Football Federation) Al-Ahli
12	DF	Salem Al-Najdi	27 January 2003 (aged 20)	(Saudi Arabian Football Federation) Al-Fateh
13	DF	Waleed Saber	22 April 2004 (aged 18)	(Saudi Arabian Football Federation) Al-Nassr
14	DF	Mubarak Al-Rajeh	1 August 2003 (aged 19)	(Saudi Arabian Football Federation) Al-Raed
15	MF	Mohammed Al-Marri	14 July 2003 (aged 19)	(Saudi Arabian Football Federation) Al-Qadsiah
16	FW	Faisal Al-Abdulwahed	29 December 2004 (aged 18)	(Saudi Arabian Football Federation) Al-Fateh
17	MF	**Marwan Al-Sahafi**	17 February 2004 (aged 19)	(Saudi Arabian Football Federation) Al-Ittihad
18	MF	Suhayb Al-Zaid	12 August 2004 (aged 18)	(Saudi Arabian Football Federation) Al-Hilal
19	FW	Yazeed Jawshan	4 May 2003 (aged 19)	(Saudi Arabian Football Federation) Al-Faisaly
20	FW	Meshari Al-Nemer	5 August 2003 (aged 19)	(Saudi Arabian Football Federation) Al-Nassr
21	GK	Osama Al-Mermesh	6 July 2003 (aged 19)	(Saudi Arabian Football Federation) Al-Ittihad
22	GK	Turki Baaljawsh	24 November 2003 (aged 19)	(Saudi Arabian Football Federation) Al-Ettifaq
23	DF	Khalid Asiri	27 November 2004 (aged 18)	(Saudi Arabian Football Federation) Al-Shabab

=== Japan ===
Japan announced their squad of 23 players on 7 February 2023. Shinya Nakano was replaced by Kosuke Matsumura after picking up an injury.

Head coach: Koichi Togashi

No.	Pos.	Player	Date of birth (age)	Club
1	GK	Ryoya Kimura	10 June 2003 (aged 19)	(Japan Football Association) Nihon University
2	DF	Kosuke Matsumura	2 May 2004 (aged 18)	(Japan Football Association) Yokohama F. Marinos
3	DF	Hayato Tanaka	1 November 2003 (aged 19)	(Japan Football Association) Kashiwa Reysol
4	DF	Shuta Kikuchi	16 August 2003 (aged 19)	(Japan Football Association) Shimizu S-Pulse
5	DF	Hayate Matsuda	2 October 2003 (aged 19)	(Japan Football Association) Mito HollyHock
6	MF	Riku Yamane	17 August 2003 (aged 19)	(Japan Football Association) Yokohama F. Marinos
7	MF	Kuryu Matsuki (captain)	30 April 2003 (aged 19)	(Japan Football Association) FC Tokyo
8	MF	Kodai Sano	25 September 2003 (aged 19)	(Japan Football Association) Fagiano Okayama
9	FW	Ayumu Yokoyama	4 March 2003 (aged 19)	(Japan Football Association) Sagan Tosu
10	FW	Sota Kitano	13 August 2004 (aged 18)	(Japan Football Association) Cerezo Osaka
11	FW	Isa Sakamoto	26 August 2003 (aged 19)	(Japan Football Association) Fagiano Okayama
12	GK	Ryusei Haruna	1 May 2004 (aged 18)	(Japan Football Association) Mito HollyHock
13	DF	Kosei Suwama	6 June 2003 (aged 19)	(Japan Football Association) University of Tsukuba
14	DF	Takatora Einaga	7 April 2003 (aged 19)	(Japan Football Association) Kawasaki Frontale
15	DF	Yusei Yashiki	18 October 2003 (aged 19)	(Japan Football Association) Oita Trinita
16	MF	Kenshin Yasuda	5 March 2005 (aged 17)	(Japan Football Association) Oita Trinita
17	MF	Issei Kumatoriya	14 February 2003 (aged 20)	(Japan Football Association) Meiji University
18	FW	Naoki Kumata	2 August 2004 (aged 18)	(Japan Football Association) FC Tokyo
19	DF	Kota Takai	4 September 2004 (aged 18)	(Japan Football Association) Kawasaki Frontale
20	MF	Taisei Abe	7 June 2004 (aged 18)	(Japan Football Association) V-Varen Nagasaki
21	MF	Hidemasa Koda	2 October 2003 (aged 19)	(Japan Football Association) Nagoya Grampus
22	DF	Niko Takahashi	17 August 2005 (aged 17)	(Royal Spanish Football Federation) Barcelona Juvenil B
23	GK	Yu Kanoshima	5 May 2003 (aged 19)	(Japan Football Association) Ryutsu Keizai University

=== China ===
China announced a provisional squad of 31 players on 10 January 2023, which was later reduced to 28 players. The final squad of 23 players was announced on 23 February 2023.

Head coach: (Spain) Antonio Puche

No.	Pos.	Player	Date of birth (age)	Club
1	GK	Li Hao	6 March 2004 (aged 18)	(Royal Spanish Football Federation) Atlético Madrid
2	DF	**Hu Hetao**	5 October 2003 (aged 19)	(Chinese Football Association) Chengdu Rongcheng
3	MF	Peng Xiao	28 July 2005 (aged 17)	(Chinese Football Association) Shandong Taishan
4	DF	Yang Minjie	16 April 2003 (aged 19)	(Chinese Football Association) Wuhan Three Towns
5	DF	**Liu Haofan**	23 October 2003 (aged 19)	(Chinese Football Association) Zhejiang Professional
6	MF	You Wenjie	16 July 2003 (aged 19)	(Chinese Football Association) Wuhan Three Towns
7	FW	Afrden Asqer (captain)	15 September 2003 (aged 19)	(Chinese Football Association) Guangzhou
8	MF	Bao Shengxin	1 August 2003 (aged 19)	(Chinese Football Association) Zhejiang Professional
9	FW	**Behram Abduweli**	8 March 2003 (aged 19)	(Chinese Football Association) Shandong Taishan
10	MF	Mewlan Mijit	27 January 2004 (aged 19)	(Chinese Football Association) Shandong Taishan
11	FW	Fan Chao	8 February 2004 (aged 19)	(Chinese Football Association) Changchun Yatai
12	DF	Zhang Yixuan	18 August 2004 (aged 18)	(Chinese Football Association) Hubei Istar
13	MF	Gao Yunan	28 September 2003 (aged 19)	(Chinese Football Association) Hebei
14	MF	Xu Bin	2 May 2004 (aged 18)	(Chinese Football Association) Guangzhou
15	DF	Xiang Rongjun	31 March 2004 (aged 18)	(Chinese Football Association) Shanghai Port
16	DF	Li Suda	9 February 2004 (aged 19)	(Chinese Football Association) Qingdao Hainiu
17	MF	Mutellip Iminqari	18 March 2004 (aged 18)	(Chinese Football Association) Chengdu Rongcheng
18	MF	Chen Zhexuan	24 September 2003 (aged 19)	(Chinese Football Association) Shandong Taishan
19	FW	Abdulla Adil	10 September 2004 (aged 18)	(Chinese Football Association) Changchun Yatai
20	FW	Rehmatulla Shohret	7 February 2003 (aged 20)	(Chinese Football Association) Hangzhou Qiantang
21	MF	Sherzat Nur	1 January 2004 (aged 19)	(Chinese Football Association) Hubei Istar
22	GK	Huo Shenping	26 November 2003 (aged 19)	(Chinese Football Association) Guangzhou
23	GK	Yu Jinyong	6 July 2004 (aged 18)	(Chinese Football Association) Shandong Taishan

=== Kyrgyzstan ===
Kyrgyzstan announced a provisional squad of 28 players on 13 January 2023. The final squad of 23 players was announced on 25 February 2023.

Head coach: (Russia) Maksim Lisitsyn

No.	Pos.	Player	Date of birth (age)	Club
1	GK	Sultan Chomoev	20 January 2003 (aged 20)	(Kyrgyz Football Union) Dordoi Bishkek
2	DF	**Khristiyan Brauzman**	15 August 2003 (aged 19)	(Kyrgyz Football Union) Abdysh-Ata Kant
3	DF	Elaman Akylbekov	11 August 2003 (aged 19)	(Kyrgyz Football Union) Ilbirs Bishkek
4	DF	**Said Datsiev**	14 April 2003 (aged 19)	(Kyrgyz Football Union) Dordoi Bishkek
5	DF	Temirlan Samat uulu	2 May 2003 (aged 19)	(Kyrgyz Football Union) Ilbirs Bishkek
6	MF	Baibol Ermekov	8 September 2005 (aged 17)	(Kyrgyz Football Union) Ilbirs Bishkek
7	FW	Atay Ilichbek uulu	18 March 2004 (aged 18)	(Kyrgyz Football Union) Ilbirs Bishkek
8	MF	Mirlan Bekberdinov	14 August 2003 (aged 19)	(Kyrgyz Football Union) Ilbirs Bishkek
9	FW	Nurbol Baktybekov	23 February 2004 (aged 19)	(Kyrgyz Football Union) Ilbirs Bishkek
10	MF	Bektur Abdyvaliev	29 April 2003 (aged 19)	(Kyrgyz Football Union) Dordoi Bishkek
11	MF	Biimyrza Zhenishbekov	4 September 2003 (aged 19)	(Kyrgyz Football Union) Abdysh-Ata Kant
12	DF	Bayastan Bokonov	18 May 2004 (aged 18)	(Kyrgyz Football Union) Dordoi Bishkek
13	GK	Astapbek Askaralyev	17 October 2003 (aged 19)	(Kyrgyz Football Union) Ilbirs Bishkek
14	MF	**Arsen Sharshenbekov**	16 March 2004 (aged 18)	(Russian Football Union) Alania Vladikavkaz
15	MF	Bektur Kochkonbaev	11 January 2003 (aged 20)	(Kyrgyz Football Union) Talant
16	GK	**Kurmanbek Nurlanbekov**	1 April 2004 (aged 18)	(Kyrgyz Football Union) Dordoi Bishkek
17	DF	Arslan Bekberdinov	14 August 2003 (aged 19)	(Kyrgyz Football Union) Abdysh-Ata Kant
18	FW	Suleiman Dzhumabekov	24 December 2003 (aged 19)	(Kyrgyz Football Union) Talant
19	FW	Marlen Murzakhmatov	21 May 2003 (aged 19)	(Kyrgyz Football Union) Dordoi Bishkek
20	MF	Irrakhimbek Nurmat uulu	27 January 2003 (aged 20)	(Kyrgyz Football Union) Kaganat
21	MF	**Ermek Kenzhebaev**	3 April 2003 (aged 19)	(Kyrgyz Football Union) Dordoi Bishkek
22	MF	**Kimi Merk**	6 July 2004 (aged 18)	(German Football Association) 1. FC Kaiserslautern
23	FW	Elzar Melisbek uulu	7 June 2004 (aged 18)	(Kyrgyz Football Union) Ilbirs Bishkek
