= Saifi =

Saifi could refer to:

- Muslim Barhai, Islamic community in northern India and Nepal
- Sifi (name)
- System Average Interruption Frequency Index, index for electric power utilities
- Saifi Village, neighborhood in Beirut, Lebanon
