= Hajjam =

Ethnic group in India

Hijama
Salmani and Turkia

Regions with significant populations
- India, Nepal, Bangladesh, Pakistan

Languages
- Urdu, Hindi, Punjabi

Religion
- Islam

Related ethnic groups
- Saifi, Shaikh

Hajjam are an ethnic group in the Indian subcontinent known for practicing cupping therapy, also known as Hijama. The word Hijama has been derived from the Arabic word Al Hajm, means "sucking", referring to this therapy. A practitioner was called a Hijama in Arab countries, and the name was used in India as well.

They are on the OBC list of Haryana and Himachal Pradesh.

== The Hajjam in Nepal ==
The Central Bureau of Statistics of Nepal classifies the Hajjam (called Hajam in the Nepal census) as a subgroup within the broader social group of Madheshi Other Caste. At the time of the 2011 Nepal census, 117,758 people (0.4% of the population of Nepal) were Hajjam. The frequency of Hajjam by province was as follows:

- Madhesh Province (1.4%)
- Lumbini Province (0.5%)
- Koshi Province (0.3%)
- Bagmati Province (0.1%)
- Gandaki Province (0.0%)
- Karnali Province (0.0%)
- Sudurpashchim Province (0.0%)

The frequency of Hajjam was higher than national average (0.4%) in the following districts:

- Saptari (1.5%)
- Dhanusha (1.4%)
- Parsa (1.4%)
- Rautahat (1.4%)
- Siraha (1.4%)
- Mahottari (1.3%)
- Sarlahi (1.3%)
- Bara (1.2%)
- Kapilvastu (1.1%)
- Banke (0.9%)
- Parasi (0.9%)
- Rupandehi (0.8%)
- Morang (0.6%)
- Sunsari (0.5%)
