= Sifi =

Sifi can refer to:

- Systemically important financial institution (SIFI), in financial policy
- Sifi (name), a given name and surname in Arabic, Persian, and Urdu
