= Abdukodir Khusanov =

Uzbek footballer (born 2004)

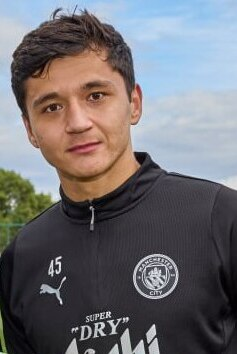
- Khusanov with Manchester City in 2025

Personal information
- Full name: Abduqodir Xikmatjon oʻgʻli Xusanov
- Date of birth: 29 February 2004 (age 22)
- Place of birth: Tashkent, Uzbekistan
- Height: 1.86 m (6 ft 1 in)
- Positions: Centre-back; right-back

Team information
- Current team: Manchester City
- Number: 45

Youth career
- 2011–2021: Bunyodkor

Senior career*
Years	Team	Apps	(Gls)
2022–2023	Energetik-BGU	36	(4)
2023–2025	Lens	24	(0)
2024	Lens B	2	(0)
2025–	Manchester City	35	(0)

International career^{‡}
2020	Uzbekistan U17	3	(0)
2022	Uzbekistan U19	2	(0)
2022–2023	Uzbekistan U20	13	(0)
2023–	Uzbekistan Olympic	9	(0)
2023–	Uzbekistan	33	(0)
Medal record
Men's football
Representing Uzbekistan
FIFA Series
Winner	2026 Uzbekistan
AFC U-20 Asian Cup
Gold medal – first place	2023	Team
CAFA Nations Cup
Silver medal – second place	2023	Team
AFC U-23 Asian Cup
Silver medal – second place	2024	Team
- * Club domestic league appearances and goals as of 14:23, 21 November 2026 (UTC) ‡ National team caps and goals as of 14:07, 6 October 2026 (UTC)

Abdukodir Khikmatzhon ugli Khusanov (Uzbek: Abduqodir Xikmatjon oʻgʻli Xusanov; born 29 February 2004) is an Uzbek professional footballer who plays as a centre-back or right-back for Premier League club Manchester City and the Uzbekistan national team.

Graduating from the youth setup of Bunyodkor, Khusanov started his career in Belarus with Energetik-BGU in 2022, where he played for one and a half seasons before his transfer to French side Lens in 2023. While at Lens, he became the first Uzbek to play in Ligue 1, before joining Manchester City in January 2025, consequently becoming the first Uzbek footballer to play in the English Premier League.

Khusanov is both an Uzbekistan youth and senior international, having represented the country from the under-17 age group onwards. He earned a senior call-up in 2023, representing them at the 2023 AFC Asian Cup and the 2026 FIFA World Cup.

== Club career ==
=== Early years ===
Born in Tashkent, Khusanov played for the youth teams of Uzbek club Bunyodkor up to the age of 18.

=== Energetik-BGU ===
In March 2022, Khusanov moved to Belarusian club Energetik-BGU. He made his debut for the club on 19 March in a match against Vitebsk, starting and playing the entire match. Khusanov scored his first goal on 2 May, in a match against Neman Grodno, where he also gave two assists. In August, Khusanov was included in the list of the most promising players in the world according to the International Center for Sports Research. At the end of the season, his club finished as the runners-up of the 2022 Belarusian Premier League. He got into the symbolic team of the championship.

In December 2022, Energetik-BGU reported that Khusanov would continue to play at the club. His first match of the new season was on 2 April 2023 against BATE Borisov. He got into the symbolic team of the second round of the Belarusian Premier League. On 23 April, Khusanov scored his first goal of the season in a match against Shakhtyor Soligorsk. Three days later, he was included in the list of the most promising players under the age of 20, where he took 15th place among centre-backs.

=== Lens ===
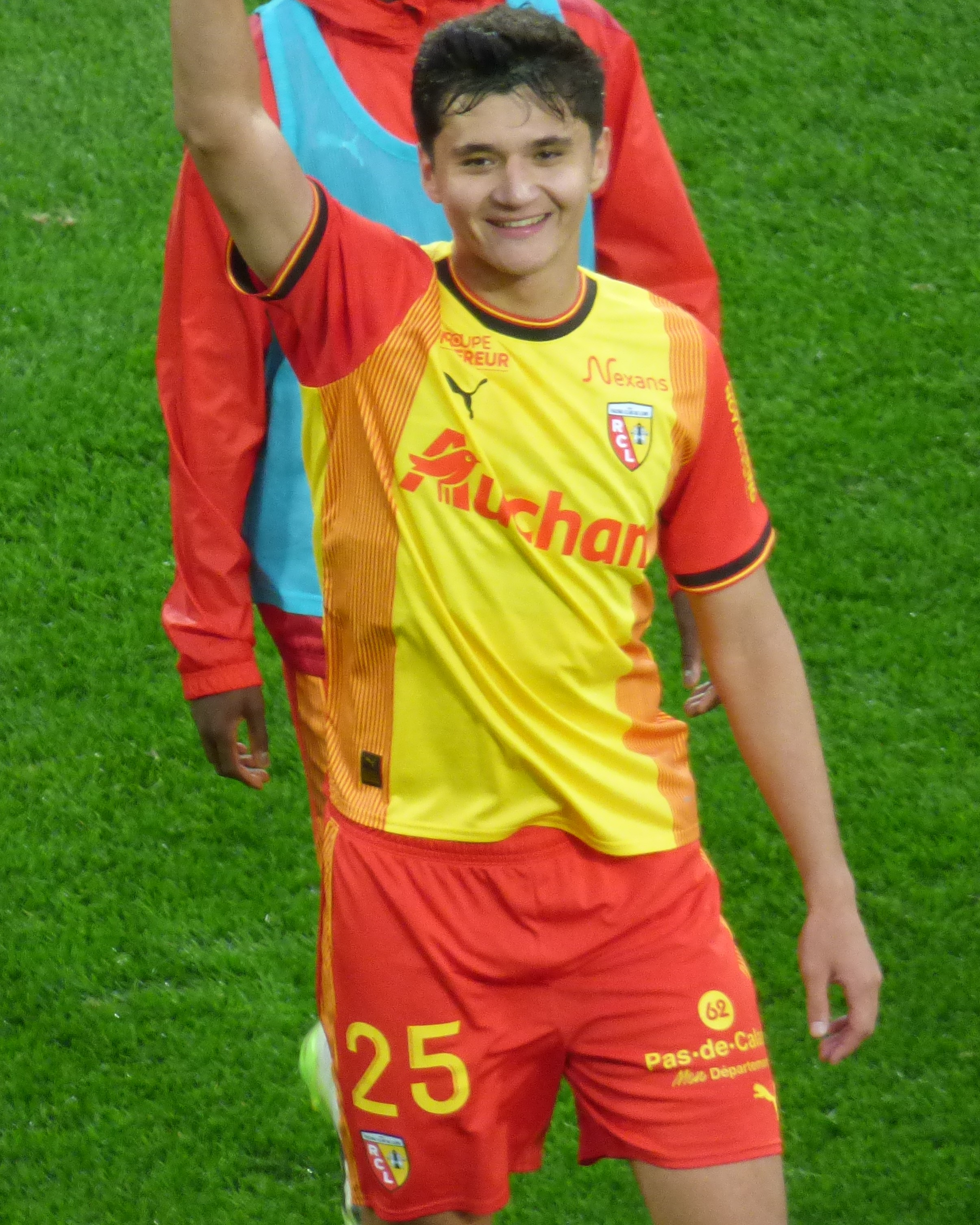
Khusanov with Lens in 2023

On 24 July 2023, Khusanov signed with Ligue 1 club Lens on a four-year contract. He made his debut for the club on 16 September in a 1–0 home loss against Metz, becoming the first Uzbek player to play in Ligue 1. On 29 November, Khusanov played his first UEFA club competition game, a 6–0 UEFA Champions League group stage defeat against Arsenal. At 19 years and 9 months old, he became the youngest Uzbek to play in the UEFA Champions League.

His final match with Lens took place on 22 December 2024 in the Coupe de France against Paris Saint-Germain, marking his debut as the first Uzbek player to participate in the competition. The match ended in a 1–1 draw, with Lens ultimately eliminated after a penalty shootout.

=== Manchester City ===
On 20 January 2025, Khusanov became the first Uzbek player to sign for a Premier League club, joining Manchester City on a four-and-a-half-year deal, on a reported initial fee of €40 million, and on 25 January, he made his debut against Chelsea. On 8 February, Khusanov, deflecting into the net a shot by teammate Rico Lewis, scored his first goal for Manchester City in a fourth round 1–2 away victory over third-tier side Leyton Orient, his first FA Cup game.

A year later, in January 2026, then-manager Pep Guardiola expressed his satisfaction with "Khusa," whose progress, he said, showed he's a "top signing." Later that year, on 25 July, Khusanov extended his contract with the club until 2031.

== International career ==
=== Youth ===
Khusanov played for the Uzbekistan under-17 national team. In June 2022, he made his debut for the Uzbekistan under-19 team, playing two friendly matches against Belarus. In September 2022, he was called up to the Uzbekistan under-20 team, for which he played two full matches against Slovakia.

==== U20 team ====
In March 2023, Khusanov joined the Uzbekistan U20 squad for the AFC U-20 Asian Cup. His first tournament match was on 1 March 2023, against Syria. The team topped their group, advancing to the knockout stage. On 11 March 2023, Khusanov helped the team defeat Australia in a penalty shoot-out in the quarter-finals, thus securing a spot in the 2023 FIFA U-20 World Cup. In their semi-final on 15 March 2023, Uzbekistan defeated South Korea in another penalty shoot-out. The team then claimed the championship title by defeating Iraq in the final on 18 March.

In May 2023, Khusanov was called up to the Uzbekistan U20 team for the FIFA U-20 World Cup. His first match in the tournament was on 20 May 2023, against Argentina. After finishing second in their group, the team advanced to the knockout stage, where they were eliminated by Israel in the round of 16 on 30 May 2023. Throughout the tournament, Khusanov was a key player, playing every match in full.

==== U23 team ====
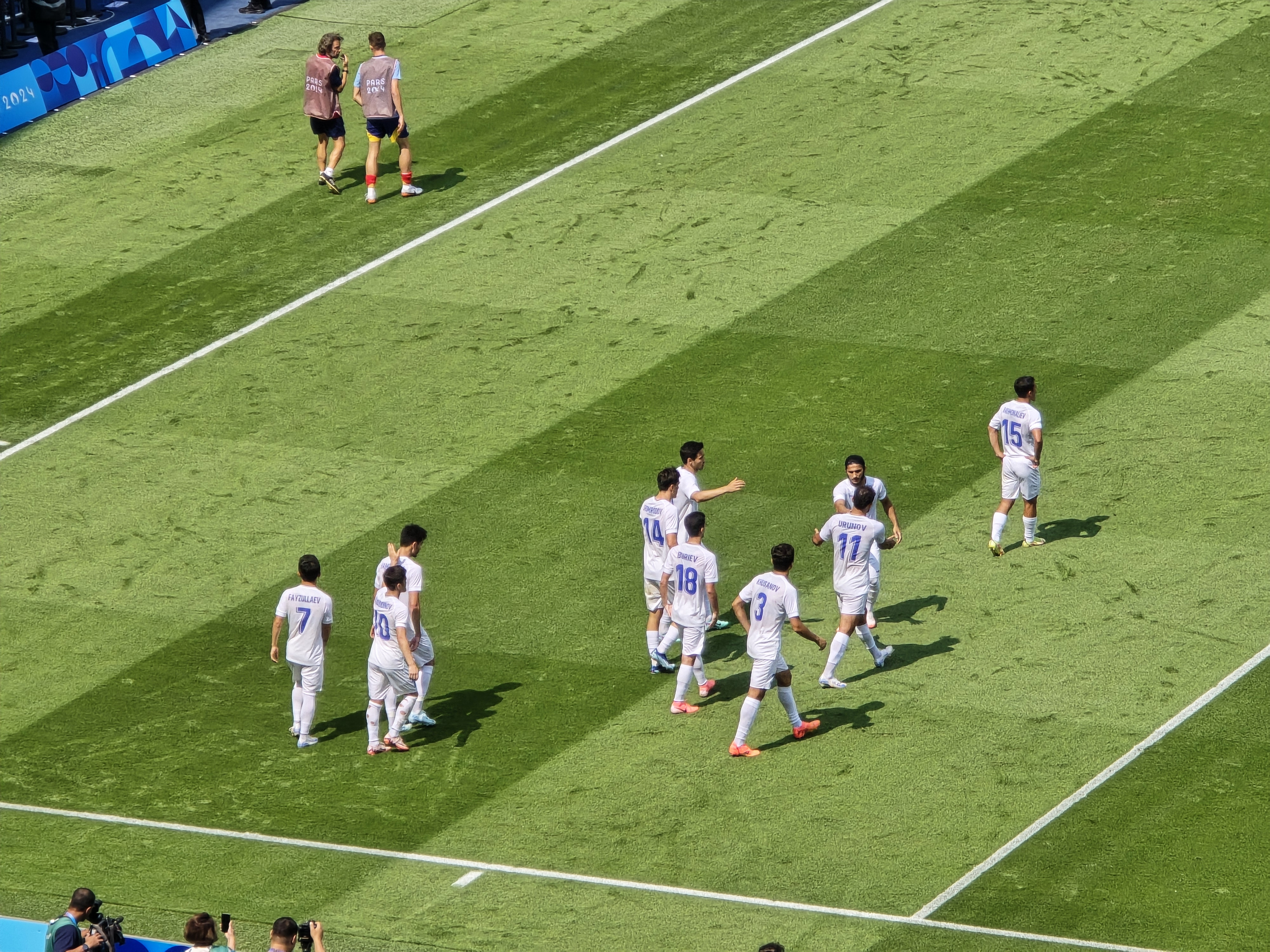
Uzbekistan versus Spain at the 2024 Summer Olympics, Parc des Princes, Paris.

In September 2023, Khusanov joined the Uzbekistan U23 team for the AFC U-23 Asian Cup qualifiers. He debuted on 6 September 2023, in a match against Afghanistan. Khusanov provided his first assist for the under-23 team on 12 September 2023, in a match against Iran, which helped secure a narrow victory.

In April 2024, Khusanov was part of the Uzbekistan U23 squad for the AFC U-23 Asian Cup. He played his first match on 23 April 2024 against Vietnam, starting in the line-up. The team reached the final, where they lost to Japan on 3 May 2024; however, Khusanov did not take part in the final match.

=== Senior ===
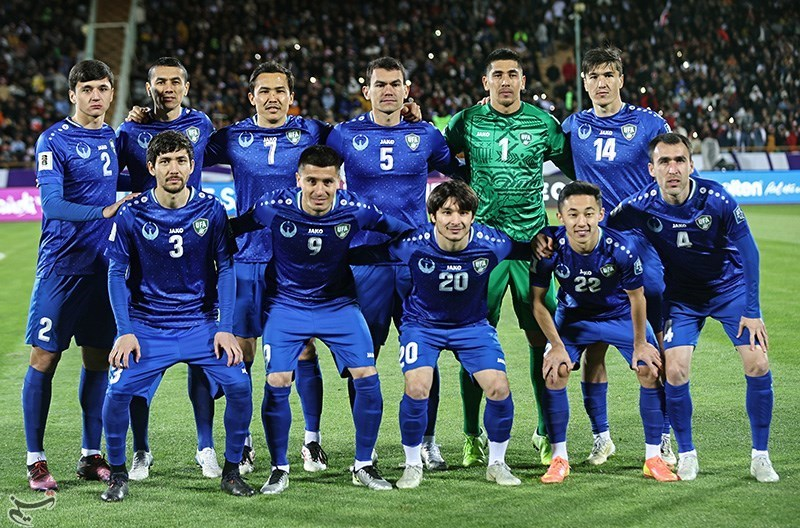
Khusanov (far left, number 2) lining up for Uzbekistan in 2025

In June 2023, Khusanov received a call-up to the Uzbekistan senior national team to participate in the CAFA Nations Cup. On 11 June, he made his international debut against Oman, replacing Farrukh Sayfiev in the 83rd minute. Together with the team, Khusanov reached the CAFA Nations Cup final, securing first place in the group stage. He ultimately became a silver medalist in the tournament, as the team lost to Iran in the final on 20 June, where Khusanov spent the entire match on the bench.

In January 2024, Khusanov travelled with the national team to the main stage of the 2023 AFC Asian Cup. His first match in the tournament took place on 13 January 2024, against Syria, where he started in the line-up and received a yellow card. By the end of the group stage, Khusanov and the team secured second place in the group and advanced to the knockout stage. Together with the team, he reached the quarter-finals, where Uzbekistan were eliminated by Qatar on 3 February in a penalty shoot-out, thus concluding their tournament run.

On 5 June 2025, Khusanov's defensive performances saw Uzbekistan qualify for the FIFA World Cup for the first time in their history, following a 0–0 draw against the United Arab Emirates in the 9th matchday of the Asian qualifiers.

On 2 June 2026, Khusanov was included in the 26-man Uzbekistan squad selected by head coach Fabio Cannavaro for the 2026 FIFA World Cup, marking the country's first-ever appearance in the tournament.

== Personal life ==
Khusanov is the son of Khikmat Khashimov (also transliterated as Hikmat Hoshimov), who had a brief stint as a professional football player with PFK Metallurg Bekabad. "Abduqodir" is a common Uzbek name of Arabic origin and means "servant of the Almighty".

In May 2025, Khusanov got married. The traditional Uzbek wedding took place in Tashkent.

== Career statistics ==
=== Club ===
As of match played 21 November 2026

Appearances and goals by club, season and competition
Club	Season	League			National cup (Note: Includes Belarusian Cup, Coupe de France, FA Cup)		League cup (Note: Includes EFL Cup)		Continental		Other		Total	
Club	Season	Division	Apps	Goals	Apps	Goals	Apps	Goals	Apps	Goals	Apps	Goals	Apps	Goals
Energetik-BGU	2022	Belarusian Premier League	27	3	2	0	—		—		—		29	3
Energetik-BGU	2023	Belarusian Premier League	8	1	0	0	—		—		—		8	1
Energetik-BGU	Total		35	4	2	0	—		—		—		37	4
Lens B	2023–24	Championnat National 3	1	0	—		—		—		—		1	0
Lens	2023–24	Ligue 1	11	0	0	0	—		4 (Note: Two appearances in UEFA Champions League, two appearances in UEFA Europa League)	0	—		15	0
Lens	2024–25	Ligue 1	13	0	1	0	—		2 (Note: Appearances in UEFA Conference League)	0	—		16	0
Lens	Total		24	0	1	0	—		6	0	—		31	0
Manchester City	2024–25	Premier League	6	0	2	1	—		1 (Note: Appearance(s) in UEFA Champions League)	0	1 (Note: Appearance in FIFA Club World Cup)	0	10	1
Manchester City	2025–26	Premier League	21	0	5	0	5	0	6	0	—		37	0
Manchester City	2026–27	Premier League	8	0	0	0	2	0	4	0	1 (Note: Appearance in FA Community Shield)	0	15	0
Manchester City	Total		35	0	7	1	7	0	11	0	2	0	62	1
Career total			94	4	10	1	7	0	17	0	2	0	130	5

=== International ===
As of match played 6 October 2026

Appearances and goals by national team and year
National team	Year	Apps	Goals
Uzbekistan	2023	7	0
Uzbekistan	2024	11	0
Uzbekistan	2025	6	0
Uzbekistan	2026	9	0
Total		33	0

== Honours ==
Manchester City

- FA Cup: 2025–26; runner-up: 2024–25
- EFL Cup: 2025–26

Uzbekistan U20

- AFC U-20 Asian Cup: 2023

Uzbekistan U23

- AFC U-23 Asian Cup runner-up: 2024

Uzbekistan

- CAFA Nations Cup: 2025; runner-up: 2023
- FIFA Series: 2026

Individual

- IFFHS Asian Men's Team of the Year: 2023, 2025
- FIFA Series Player of the Tournament: 2026

Orders

- Medal "Kelajak Bunyodkori": 2023
