= Pulatkhuzha Kholdorkhonov =

Uzbek footballer

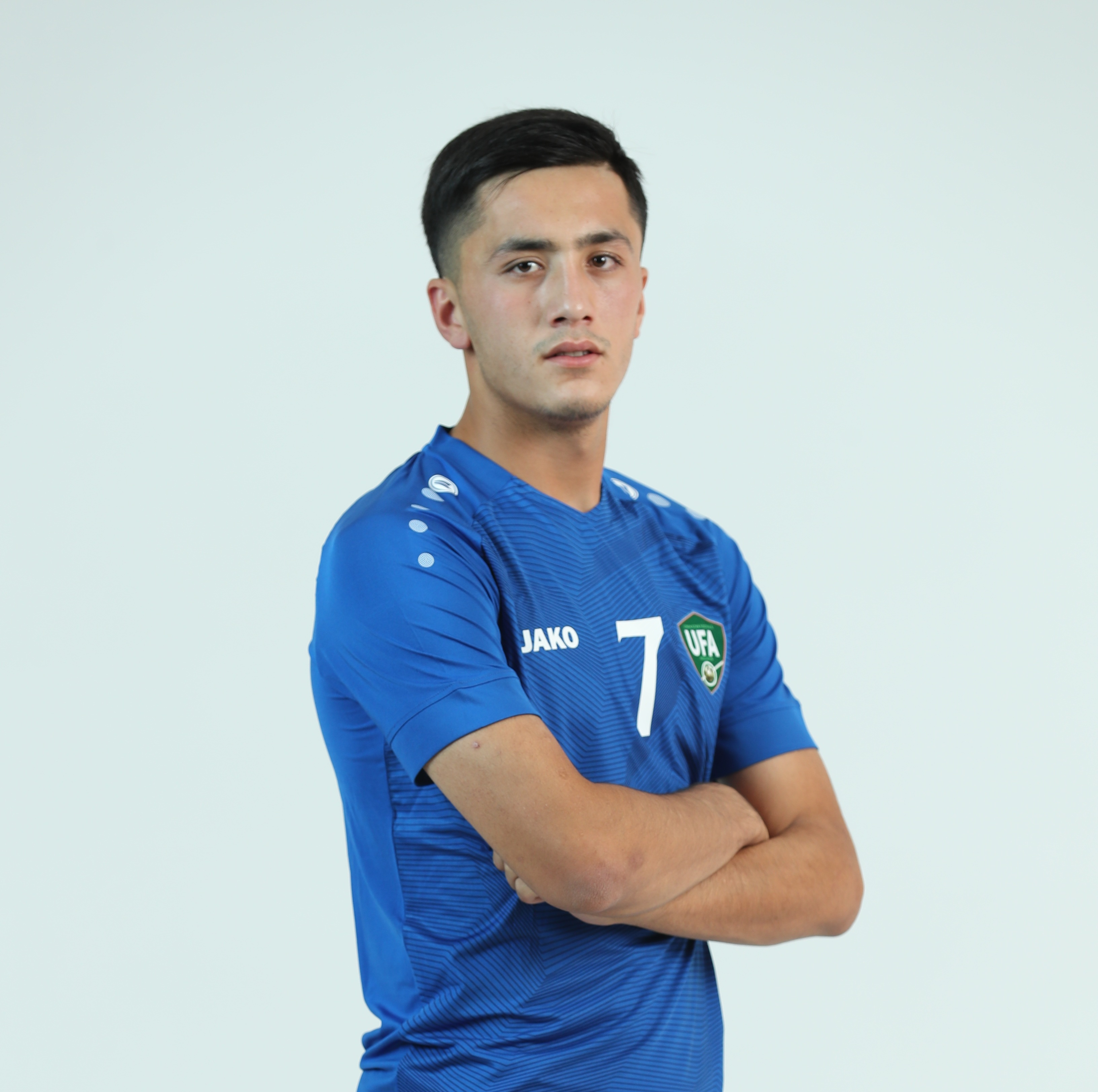

Personal information
- Date of birth: 6 July 2003 (age 23)
- Place of birth: Kosonsoy District, Uzbekistan
- Height: 1.86 m (6 ft 1 in)
- Position: Forward

Team information
- Current team: Andijan
- Number: 7

Youth career
- 2015–2020: Pakhtakor Academy

Senior career*
| Years | Team | Apps | (Gls) |
| 2020 | Pakhtakor-2 | | |
| 2021–2024 | Pakhtakor | 40 | (3) |
| 2022 | → Olympic (loan) | 20 | (4) |
| 2025 | Navbahor | 7 | (1) |
| 2025 | Shoʻrtan | 15 | (7) |
| 2026- | Andijan | 14 | (1) |

International career
| 2021-2022 | Uzbekistan U19 | 4 | (4) |
| 2022-2023 | Uzbekistan U20 | 14 | (2) |
| 2023 | Uzbekistan U23 | 6 | (0) |
- * Club domestic league appearances and goals

Pulatkhuzha Kholdorkhonov (Uzbek: Poʻlatxoʻja Xoldorxonov; born 6 July 2003 in Kosonsoy District, Namangan Region) is an Uzbek professional footballer who plays as a forward for FC Andijon. He was a winner of the 2023 AFC U-20 Asian Cup.

== Club career ==
Poʻlatxoʻja was born on 6 July 2003 in Kosonsoy District, Namangan Region. Graduate of Pakhtakor football academy. Until 2021, played for Pakhtakor's reserve team. Until 2021, Xoldorxonov played for Pakhtakor's reserve side, where he made 21 appearances and scored 11 goals. After a successful 2021 season, he was promoted to the first team by the coaching staff. In his first season with the senior team, he made 7 appearances in the Uzbekistan Super League and 1 appearance in the AFC Champions League. In the latter competition, he became one of the youngest goalscorers in AFC Champions League history (Pakhtakor - Al-Quwa). During the 2022 season, Xoldorxonov played for Olympic in Uzbekistan Super League (21 matches), Uzbekistan Cup (2 matches) and also featured in 15 reserve matches, scoring a total of 17 goals across all competitions.

== Career statistics ==
=== Club ===
| Club | Season | League Apps | League Goals | Cup Apps | Cup Goals | ACL Apps | ACL Goals | Total Apps | Total Goals |
|---|---|---|---|---|---|---|---|---|---|
| Pakhtakor | 2021 | 7 | 0 | 0 | 0 | 1 | 1 | 7 | 1 |
| Pakhtakor | 2022 | 21 | 4 | 2 | 0 | - | - | 23 | 4 |
| Total | | 28 | 4 | 2 | 0 | 1 | 1 | 30 | 5 |

=== International ===
| Year | Appearances | Goals |
|---|---|---|
| 2022 | 4 | 4 |
| 2023 | 14 | 2 |
| Total | 18 | 6 |

== Honours ==
Pakhtakor

- Uzbekistan Super Cup winner: 2021
- Uzbekistan Super League winner: 2022

Uzbekistan U20

- AFC U-20 Asian Cup winner: 2023
