= Huo Shenping =

Chinese footballer (born 2003)

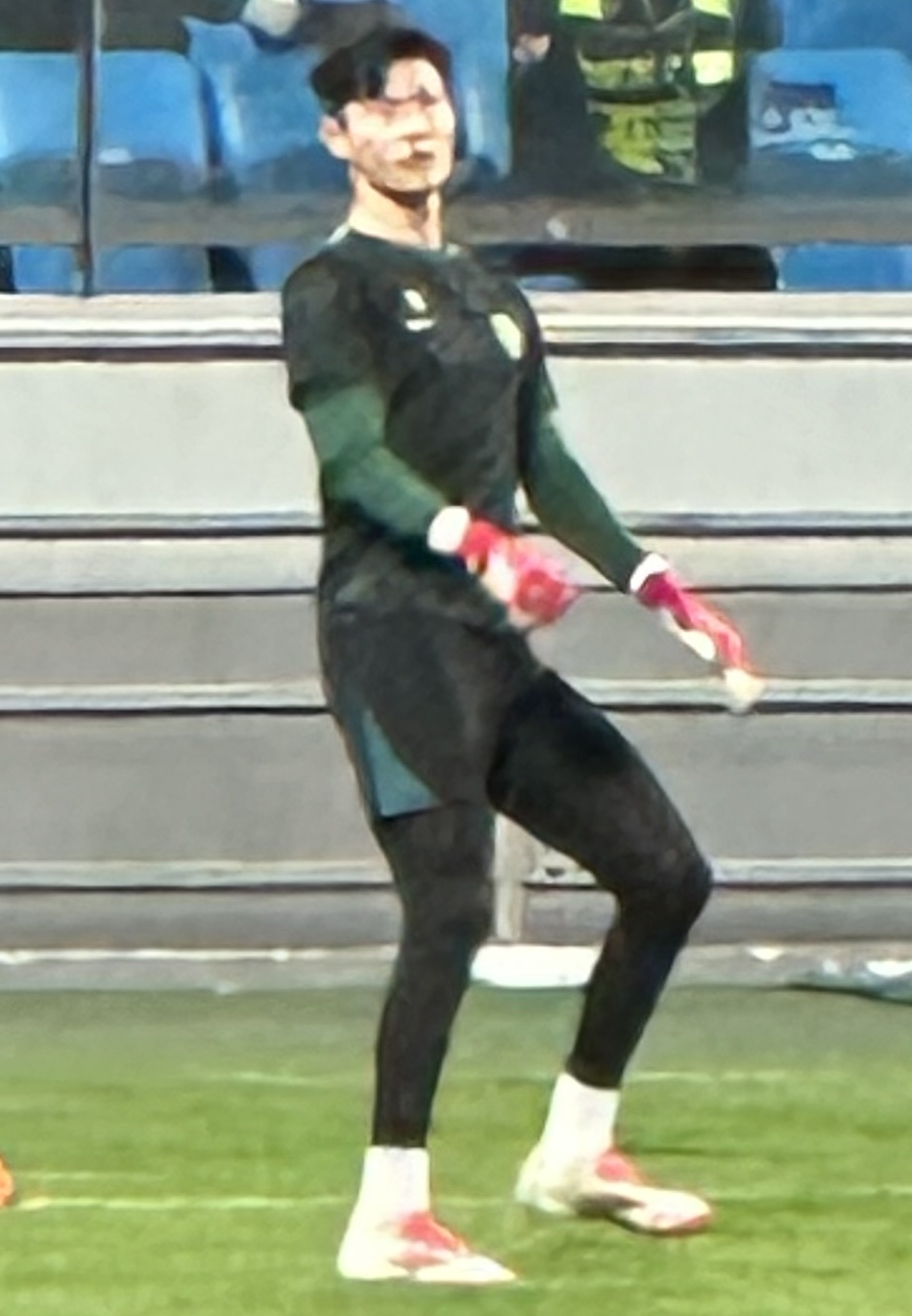
- Huo in April 2025

Personal information
- Full name: Huo Shenping
- Date of birth: 26 November 2003 (age 22)
- Place of birth: Dancheng County, Henan, China
- Height: 1.88 m (6 ft 2 in)
- Position: Goalkeeper

Team information
- Current team: Zhejiang FC
- Number: 32

Youth career
- 2013–2021: Guangzhou FC

Senior career*
Years	Team	Apps	(Gls)
2021	Guangxi Huaqiangu	3	(0)
2022–2024	Guangzhou FC	47	(0)
2025–	Zhejiang FC	2	(0)

International career^{‡}
2022	China U19	1	(0)
2025–2026	China U23	3	(0)
Medal record
Men's football
Representing China
AFC U-23 Asian Cup
Runner-up	2026 Saudi Arabia	Team
- * Club domestic league appearances and goals as of 22 November 2025 ‡ National team caps and goals as of 16 January 2026

Huo Shenping (Chinese: 霍深坪; pinyin: Huò Shēnpíng; born 26 November 2003) is a Chinese professional footballer who plays as a goalkeeper for Chinese Super League club Zhejiang FC.

== Club career ==
Born in Dancheng County in Zhoukou, Henan, Huo Shenping joined the Evergrande Football School affiliate of Guangzhou Evergrande in 2013. Initially trying out as a midfielder and as a defender, he became a goalkeeper by the end of 2013. After training at the Evergrande Football School with goalkeeping coach Kang Yanlin until 2018, Huo was sent out to train and study academics at Evergrande's academy in Spain.

In 2021, Huo made a transfer to Chinese Champions League club Guangxi Huaqiangu. He made three appearances for Guangxi Huaqiangu in the finals round of the 2021 Chinese Champions League.

On 2 May 2022, Huo was named in Guangzhou's first-team squad ahead of the 2022 Chinese Super League season, being given the number 32. On 15 June 2022, he made his debut for Guangzhou in a 1–0 league defeat to Shanghai Port. At the conclusion of the 2022 season, Huo made a total of three league appearances and two Chinese FA Cup appearances, as he followed Guangzhou finish the league in seventeenth place and suffered relegation from the Chinese Super League.

In 2023, Huo became the first-choice goalkeeper for Guangzhou in their 2023 China League One campaign, and made 22 league appearances as he guided a young Guangzhou side to twelfth place. Following the end of the 2023 season and the expiration of his contract with Guangzhou, Huo went on trial at newly promoted China League One club Yunnan Yukun, but later renewed his contract with Guangzhou for another season. After a 1–0 away league victory over Dalian Yingbo on 4 May 2024, Huo taunted the home fans by bowing to them, and caused physical conflict between the two teams, with Huo being struck by Dalian Yingbo player Wang Xuanhong as a result. Huo was suspended for four league matches and fined ¥40,000. After the 2024 season, Guangzhou finished in third place, with Huo Shenping featuring in 22 league matches. On 6 January 2025, Guangzhou ceased its operations following heavy historical debts, and Huo was subsequently released.

On 13 February 2025, Huo joined Chinese Super League side Zhejiang FC, for a rumoured transfer fee of ¥2,400,000. On 6 April 2025, Huo made his debut for Zhejiang in a 2–0 away defeat to Beijing Guoan, following an injury to starting goalkeeper Zhao Bo.

== International career ==
On 16 September 2022, he made his debut for China U19 in a 2–1 loss to Uzbekistan during 2023 AFC U-20 Asian Cup qualification.

In February 2023, Huo was selected as part of the China U20 squad for the 2023 AFC U-20 Asian Cup.

== Personal life ==
In 2022, Huo was admitted to the South China University of Technology. In 2025, Huo claimed that Japanese goalkeeper Shūsaku Nishikawa has been his idol while growing up.

== Career statistics ==
=== Club ===
As of 22 June 2025

Appearances and goals by club, season, and competition
Club	Season	League			Cup		Continental		Other		Total	
Club	Season	Division	Apps	Goals	Apps	Goals	Apps	Goals	Apps	Goals	Apps	Goals
Guangxi Huaqiangu	2021	CMCL	3	0	–		–		–		3	0
Guangzhou FC	2022	Chinese Super League	3	0	2	0	0 (Note: Appearances in AFC Champions League)	0	–		5	0
Guangzhou FC	2023	China League One	22	0	1	0	–		–		23	0
Guangzhou FC	2024	China League One	22	0	1	0	–		–		23	0
Guangzhou FC	Total		47	0	4	0	0	0	0	0	51	0
Zhejiang FC	2025	Chinese Super League	2	0	2	0	–		–		4	0
Career total			52	0	6	0	0	0	0	0	58	0

== Honours ==
China U23

- AFC U-23 Asian Cup runner-up: 2026
