= Hayder Abdulkareem =

Iraqi footballer (born 2004)

- Abdulkareem with Al-Zawraa in 2026

Personal information
- Full name: Hayder Abdulkareem Tawfeeq
- Date of birth: 7 August 2004 (age 22)
- Place of birth: Baghdad, Iraq
- Height: 1.91 m (6 ft 3 in)
- Position: Midfielder

Team information
- Current team: Al-Nassr
- Number: 8

Youth career
- –2023: Al-Zawraa

Senior career*
Years	Team	Apps	(Gls)
2023–2026	Al-Zawraa	9	(2)
2025	→ Al-Kahrabaa (loan)	25	(2)
2026–	Al-Nassr	1	(0)

International career^{‡}
2022–2024	Iraq U20	16	(4)
2024–	Iraq U23	2	(0)
2026–	Iraq	1	(0)
Medal record
Men's football
Representing Iraq
AFC U-20 Asian Cup
Second place	2023 Uzbekistan	Team
- * Club domestic league appearances and goals as of 3 April 2026 ‡ National team caps and goals as of 26 September 2026

Hayder Abdulkareem Tawfeeq Tofee (Arabic: حيدر عبدالكريم توفيق توفي; born 7 August 2004) is an Iraqi professional footballer who plays as a midfielder for Saudi club Al-Nassr and the Iraq national team.

== Club career ==
=== Al-Kahrabaa ===
Hayder made his breakthrough in senior football while on loan at Al-Kahrabaa, a Baghdad club renowned for developing future national team players, in 2025, playing a key role in their midfield, scoring twice in the Iraq Stars League.

=== Al-Zawraa ===
Having come up through the youth system of Iraqi giants Al-Zawraa and impressing on loan at Al-Kahrabaa and with the Iraqi youth national teams, Abdulkareem was given a chance in Al-Zawraa's first team ahead of the 2025-26 Iraq Stars League, where he would go on to play a crucial role for his boyhood club, scoring twice and helping them go unbeaten in all but one of the games he participated in the league, as well as making his continental debut in the AFC Champions League Two.

Following intense reported interest from Saudi Pro League club Al-Nassr ever since the two clubs faced each other in the AFC Champions League and especially throughout the winter transfer window, Al-Zawraa accepted an offer from the Saudi side which saw them earn $500,000 and retain a 15% sell-on clause, with Abdulkareem signing a two-and-a-half year contract, with an option for an extra year.

Hayder shared an emotional farewell with the Al-Zawraa fans after his transfer to Al-Nassr was announced, paying tribute to the club he had nurtured his skills at throughout his entire youth career, progressing through Al-Zawraa's academy, and promising to keep the club in his heart as he moves forward.

=== Al-Nassr ===
Al-Nassr manager Jorge Jesus showed interest in Hayder and urged the Saudi giants to sign him in 2026, following the midfielder's impressive performances for Al-Zawraa in the Iraq Stars League and the AFC Champions League Two, where he put down a strong performance against Al-Nassr, despite his side losing. After lengthy negotiations between the two clubs, Al-Nassr reached an agreement to sign Abdulkareem for $500,000 on a two and a half year contract with an option for an extra year.

Initially joining the reserve squad, Hayder scored in his first appearance in the U-21 league and continued training with the reserves, though he joined the first team for their Champions League fixtures against Turkmenistani side Arkadag, where he made his debut for his new club.

In April, with Joao Felix suspended and Kingsley Coman and Inigo Martinez injured, Jorge Jesus called Hayder up from the reserve side to prepare for Al-Nassr's upcoming league match against Al-Najma with the first team, as they looked to maintain their lead at the top of the Saudi league.

Following Iraq's qualification to the 2026 FIFA World Cup in April, Abdulkareem celebrated with his teammates in Riyadh, including Sadio Mane who would be facing Iraq in the group stage which put them and Senegal head to head.

== International career ==
=== Under-20 ===
In 2023, Hayder was called up to Iraq's squads for both the 2023 AFC U-20 Asian Cup, where he played every single match, scoring two goals, as he helped Iraq reach the final, and the 2023 FIFA U-20 World Cup in Argentina.

=== Senior ===
On 26 September 2026, Abdulkareem made his debut for the Iraq national team in an Arabian Gulf Cup game against Kuwait.

== Career Statistics ==
=== Club ===
As of match played 3 April 2026

Appearances and goals by club, season and competition
Club	Season	League			National cup (Note: Includes Iraq FA Cup)		Continental		Total	
Club	Season	Division	Apps	Goals	Apps	Goals	Apps	Goals	Apps	Goals
Al-Kahrabaa (loan)	2024–25	Iraq Stars League	25	2	-	-	-	-	25	2
Al-Zawraa	2025–26	Iraq Stars League	9	2	0	0	3	0	12	2
Al-Nassr	2025–26	Saudi Pro League	1	0	0	0	2	0	3	0
Career total			35	4	0	0	5	0	40	4

== Honours ==
Al-Nassr

- Saudi Pro League: 2025–26

Iraq U20

- AFC U-20 Asian Cup runner-up: 2023
