= Sifi (name) =

Sifi, Seifi, or Saifi (Arabic: سيفي; Persian: سیفی; Urdu: سیفی) can be a given name, a middle name, or a surname. Notable people with the name include:

== Given name ==
- Sifi Ghrieb, prime minister of Algeria

== Middle name ==
- Rahman Seifi Azad, Iranian producer

== Surname ==
- Amari Saifi (born c. 1956) a.k.a. Abou Haidara or Abderrazak le Para, a leader of the Islamist militia Salafist Group for Preaching and Combat (GSPC)
- Euthymios Saifi (1643–1723), Melkite Catholic bishop of Tyre and Sidon
- Khalid Saifi (activist), Indian human rights activist
- Mersad Seifi (born 2003), Iranian football left-back
- Mokdad Sifi, Algerian politician
- Mohammad Gulzar Saifi (born 1983), Indian educator and community organizer
- Mostafa Seifi (born 1985), Iranian football midfielder
- Nadeem Saifi (born 1954), part of the Indian music production duo Nadeem-Shravan
- Rafik Saïfi (born 1975), Algerian football player
- Shahrzad Seifi, Iranian producer and actress
- Tokia Saïfi (born 1959), French politician and Member of the European Parliament
