= Mostafa Essam =

Qatari footballer (born 2003)

Personal information
- Full name: Mostafa Essam Mostafa Abouelela
- Date of birth: 20 May 2003 (age 23)
- Place of birth: Qatar
- Position: Midfielder

Team information
- Current team: Al Rayyan
- Number: 25

Youth career
- Al Rayyan

Senior career*
Years	Team	Apps	(Gls)
2021–	Al Rayyan	3	(0)
2022–2023	→ Júpiter Leonés (loan)	7	(0)

International career
2021–2022	Qatar U19	4	(0)
2023–	Qatar U20	5	(0)
- * Club domestic league appearances and goals as of 1 March 2023

Mostafa Essam Mostafa Abouelela (Arabic: مصطفى عصام; born 20 May 2003) is a Qatari footballer who plays as a midfielder for Al Rayyan.

== Career ==
Essam started his career with Qatari top flight side Al Rayyan, where he made 8 appearances and scored 0 goals. On 17 October 2021, Essam debuted for Al Rayyan during a 0–3 loss to Al Duhail. In 2022, he signed for Júpiter Leonés in the Spanish fifth tier.
