= Xu Bin (footballer) =

Chinese footballer (born 2004)

Xu Bin 徐彬
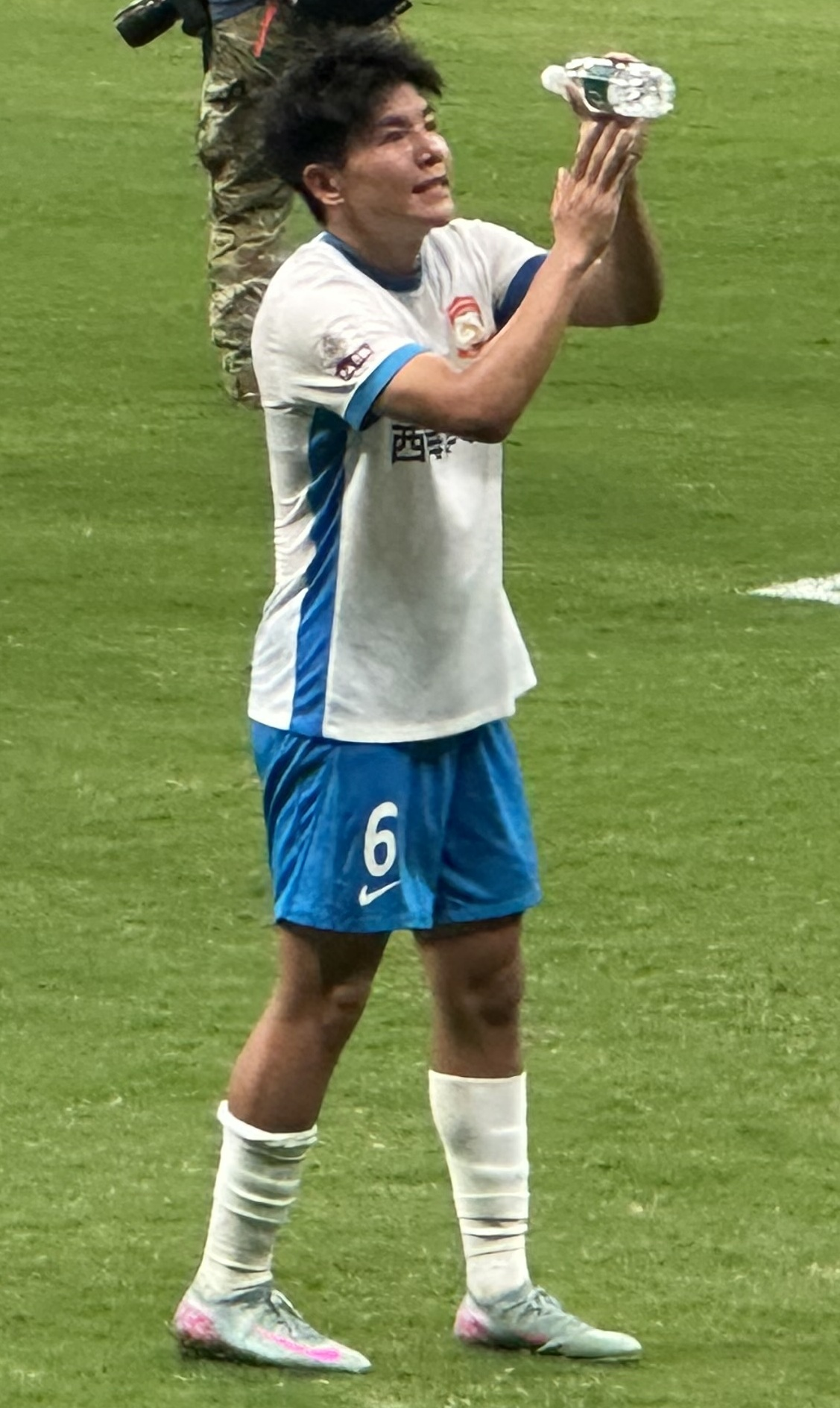
- Xu Bin with Qingdao West Coast in 2025

Personal information
- Full name: Xu Bin
- Date of birth: 2 May 2004 (age 22)
- Place of birth: Nan County, Hunan, China
- Height: 1.75 m (5 ft 9 in)
- Position: Defensive midfielder

Team information
- Current team: Wolverhampton Wanderers

Youth career
- 2014–2023: Guangzhou FC

Senior career*
Years	Team	Apps	(Gls)
2022–2024	Guangzhou FC	40	(0)
2025	Qingdao West Coast	27	(0)
2026–	Wolverhampton Wanderers	0	(0)
2026	→ Barnsley (loan)	0	(0)

International career^{‡}
2022–2023	China U20	8	(1)
2023–2026	China U23	22	(0)
2026–	China	4	(0)
Medal record
Representing China
AFC U-23 Asian Cup
Runner-up	2026 Saudi Arabia	Team
Asian Games
Bronze medal – third place	2026 Aichi–Nagoya	Team
- * Club domestic league appearances and goals as of 28 July 2026 ‡ National team caps and goals as of 13:11, 5 July 2026 (UTC)

Xu Bin (Chinese: 徐彬; pinyin: Xú Bīn; born 2 May 2004) is a Chinese professional footballer who plays as a defensive midfielder for EFL Championship club Wolverhampton Wanderers, and the China national team.

== Club career ==
=== Youth career ===
Xu started his youth career at the Evergrande Football School of Guangzhou Evergrande in 2014, and after winning the U14 Chinese FA Cup with the Evergrande Football School in 2018, he moved abroad to Spain to pursue his studies with a sector of the Evergrande Football School in Spain.

=== Guangzhou FC ===
On 16 November 2022, Xu made his competitive debut when he entered play as an 80th-minute substitute in a 4–2 win over Sichuan Jiuniu in the Chinese FA Cup. He made his league debut a month later on 23 December 2022, starting in a Chinese Super League game against Beijing Guoan. Xu was re-registered as a Guangzhou player in the 2023 summer transfer window, and became a first-team regular.

=== Qingdao West Coast ===
On 26 January 2025, weeks after Guangzhou FC failed to obtain their professional league licence for the 2025 season, Xu Bin joined Chinese Super League side Qingdao West Coast on a free transfer.

=== Wolverhampton Wanderers ===
On 30 January 2026, Xu joined Premier League club Wolverhampton Wanderers on a free transfer.

==== Barnsley (loan) ====
On 6 February 2026, Xu joined EFL League One club Barnsley on loan until the end of the season. He returned to Wolves at the end of the 2025–26 season without having made a first-team appearance for Barnsley.

== International career ==
Xu represented China in various youth levels, including the China U15s and the China U20s.

Xu was selected for the China U20 squad in the 2023 AFC U-20 Asian Cup. He went on to score a goal in a 2–0 win against Saudi Arabia in the group stage, connecting with a Mutellip Iminqari low cross.

In November 2023, Xu was called up to a China U23 training camp to prepare for the 2024 AFC U-23 Asian Cup and qualification to the 2024 Summer Olympics.

In January 2026, Xu was selected for China U23 squad in 2026 AFC U-23 Asian Cup. He was named the captain throughout the tournament and won a silver medal with China.

== Personal life ==
In 2020, Xu Bin identified Casemiro as his footballing idol.

== Career statistics ==
=== Club ===
As of end of 2025–26 season

Appearances and goals by club, season, and competition
Club	Season	League			National cup (Note: Includes Chinese FA Cup, FA Cup)		League cup (Note: Includes EFL Cup)		Continental		Other		Total	
Club	Season	Division	Apps	Goals	Apps	Goals	Apps	Goals	Apps	Goals	Apps	Goals	Apps	Goals
Guangzhou FC	2022	Chinese Super League	2	0	2	0	—		—		—		4	0
Guangzhou FC	2023	China League One	14	0	0	0	—		—		—		14	0
Guangzhou FC	2024	China League One	24	0	1	0	—		—		—		25	0
Guangzhou FC	Total		40	0	3	0	0	0	0	0	0	0	43	0
Qingdao West Coast	2025	Chinese Super League	27	0	3	0	—		—		—		30	0
Wolverhampton Wanderers	2025–26	Premier League	0	0	0	0	0	0	—		—		0	0
Barnsley (loan)	2025–26	League One	0	0	—		—		—		—		0	0
Career total			67	0	6	0	0	0	0	0	0	0	73	0

=== International ===
As of match played 31 March 2026

Appearances and goals by national team and year
National team	Year	Apps	Goals
China	2026	4	0
Total		4	0

== Honours ==
China U23

- AFC U-23 Asian Cup runner-up: 2026
