= Naoki Kumata =

Japanese footballer

Naoki Kumata 熊田 直紀
Personal information
- Full name: Naoki Kumata
- Date of birth: 2 August 2004 (age 22)
- Place of birth: Fukushima, Japan
- Height: 1.81 m (5 ft 11 in)
- Position: Forward

Team information
- Current team: Iwaki FC (on loan from FC Tokyo)
- Number: 38

Youth career
- Midorigaoka SSS
- Estrellas FC
- –2022: FC Tokyo

Senior career*
Years	Team	Apps	(Gls)
2022–	FC Tokyo	8	(1)
2024	→ Jong Genk (loan)	9	(1)
2024–	→ Iwaki FC (loan)	43	(6)

International career^{‡}
2019	Japan U15		
2022–	Japan U19	10	(8)
2023–	Japan U20	3	(0)
- * Club domestic league appearances and goals as of 14 August 2026 ‡ National team caps and goals as of 15 March 2023

Naoki Kumata (熊田 直紀, Kumata Naoki; born 2 August 2004) is a Japanese footballer who plays as a forward for J2 League club Iwaki FC, on loan from FC Tokyo.

== Club career ==
Born in Fukushima Prefecture, Kumata joined FC Tokyo at under-15 level.

On 26 January 2024, Kumata was loaned until the end of 2024 to Genk in Belgium and assigned to their reserve team Jong Genk that plays in the second-tier Challenger Pro League.

On 9 August 2024, Kumata was loaned to Iwaki FC. On 26 December 2024, his loan with the club was extended for the 2025 season.

== International career ==
Kumata was called up to the Japan U-20 squad for the 2023 FIFA U-20 World Cup.

== Career statistics ==
=== Club ===
As of 23 February 2022.

Club	Season	League			National Cup		League Cup		Other		Total	
Club	Season	Division	Apps	Goals	Apps	Goals	Apps	Goals	Apps	Goals	Apps	Goals
FC Tokyo	2022	J1 League	0	0	0	0	2 (Note: Appearances in the J.League Cup)	0	0	0	2	0
Career total			0	0	0	0	2	0	0	0	2	0

== Honours ==
Individual

- AFC U-20 Asian Cup Top Goalscorer: 2023 (5 goals)
