= Muslim Barhai =

Saifi
Regions with significant populations
- India; Nepal

Religion
- Islam

Related ethnic groups
- Barhai; Saifi; Lohar

The Muslim Saifi, or sometimes pronounced Barhai are a Muslim community, found in North India. They are also known as Saifi which denotes the Muslim sub-caste of blacksmiths and carpenters. A small number are also found in the Terai region of Nepal.

They hold the OBC status in Haryana.
