= Kodai Sano (footballer) =

Japanese footballer (born 2003)

Kodai Sano 佐野 航大
Personal information
- Full name: Kodai Sano
- Date of birth: 25 September 2003 (age 23)
- Place of birth: Tsuyama, Okayama, Japan
- Height: 1.76 m (5 ft 9 in)
- Position: Midfielder

Team information
- Current team: PSV
- Number: 24

Youth career
- –2018: FC Viparte
- 2019–2021: Yonago Kita High School

Senior career*
Years	Team	Apps	(Gls)
2022–2023	Fagiano Okayama	50	(5)
2023–2026	NEC	84	(10)
2026–	PSV	10	(2)

International career^{‡}
2023–	Japan U20	11	(2)
2025–	Japan	5	(0)
- * Club domestic league appearances and goals as of 31 October 2026 ‡ National team caps and goals as of 14 November 2026

Kodai Sano (佐野 航大, Sano Kōdai; born 25 September 2003) is a Japanese professional footballer who plays as a midfielder for Eredivisie club PSV and the Japan national team.

== Club career ==
=== Fagiano Okayama ===
A graduate of the Yonago Kita High School, Sano signed his first professional contract with J2 League side Fagiano Okayama in October 2021.

He made his professional debut for the club during the 2022 season, scoring three goals in 28 league matches.

=== NEC ===
On 14 August 2023, Fagiano Okayama announced that they reached an agreement with Dutch side NEC for the transfer of Sano on a permanent deal; the deal was made official three days later, as the player signed a five-year contract with the Eredivisie club. In the process, Sano became NEC's second Japanese-born signing of the season, following Koki Ogawa.

He made his debut for the club on 16 September 2023, coming on as a substitute for Rober in the 59th minute of a 4–0 league loss to PSV.

On 17 Jan 2026, Sano would score a dramatic late winner in the third minute of stoppage time in a 4–3 win over NAC Breda in the Eredivisie. This extended NEC's unbeaten run in all competitions to nine matches; which started on 9 November 2025 with a 2–0 win over Groningen, where Sano also scored the opener.

=== PSV ===
On 8 August 2026, Sano signed a five-year contract with PSV.

== Style of play ==
Sano is a versatile central midfielder capable of operating in several roles, including as a defensive midfielder, a box-to-box midfielder and a more advanced central midfielder. His playing style is characterised by his high work rate, mobility, ball-winning ability and technical quality in possession. His versatility was highlighted by PSV manager Peter Bosz, who noted that Sano could perform in all three midfield positions within the team's system.

His technical ability is also reflected in his creativity under pressure. During PSV's UEFA Champions League match against Shakhtar Donetsk in September 2026, he produced an unexpected backheel-style pass while facing away from goal, creating an attacking opportunity. He has also demonstrated the ability to regain possession and immediately initiate counter-attacks through forward ball carries.

== International career ==
Sano has represented Japan at under-20 level, having taken part in both the 2023 AFC U-20 Asian Cup and the 2023 FIFA U-20 World Cup.

== Personal life ==
Sano is the younger brother of fellow professional footballer Kaishu Sano.

== Career statistics ==
=== Club ===
As of 4 November 2026

Appearances and goals by club, season and competition
Club	Season	League			National cup (Note: Includes Emperor's Cup, KNVB Cup)		League cup		Continental		Other		Total	
Club	Season	Division	Apps	Goals	Apps	Goals	Apps	Goals	Apps	Goals	Apps	Goals	Apps	Goals
Fagiano Okayama	2022	J2 League	28	3	0	0	0	0	—		1 (Note: Appearances in the J1 League promotion-relegation playoffs)	0	29	3
Fagiano Okayama	2023	J2 League	20	2	1	0	—		—		—		21	2
Fagiano Okayama	Total		48	5	1	0	0	0	—		1	0	50	5
NEC	2023–24	Eredivisie	25	5	6	1	—		—		0	0	31	6
NEC	2024–25	Eredivisie	25	2	2	0	—		—		1 (Note: Appearance in Eredivisie European play-offs)	1	28	3
NEC	2025–26	Eredivisie	34	3	5	0	—		—		—		39	3
NEC	Total		84	10	13	1	—		—		1	1	98	12
PSV	2026–27	Eredivisie	10	2	0	0	—		4 (Note: Appearances in UEFA Champions League)	1	—		14	3
Career total			142	17	14	1	0	0	4	1	2	1	162	20

=== International ===
As of match played 14 November 2026

Appearances and goals by national team and year
National team	Year	Apps	Goals
Japan	2025	1	0
Japan	2026	4	0
Total		5	0
