= Otabek Boymurodov =

Uzbekistani association football player

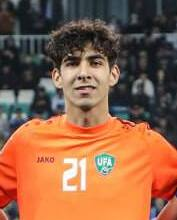

Personal information
- Full name: Otabek Boymurodov
- Date of birth: June 5, 2003 (age 23)
- Place of birth: Tashkent, Uzbekistan
- Height: 1.96 m (6 ft 5 in)
- Position: Goalkeeper

Team information
- Current team: Surkhon
- Number: 25

Youth career
- 2021-2023: Pakhtakor

Senior career*
Years	Team	Apps	(Gls)
2023-2024	Pakhtakor	0	(0)
2025-2026	Bukhara	9	(0)
2026-	Surkhon	7	(0)

International career
2022-2023	Uzbekistan U-20	12	(0)
2023-	Uzbekistan U-23	7	(0)
- * Club domestic league appearances and goals as of 29 July 2026

Otabek Boymurodov (born 5 June 2003 in Tashkent) is an Uzbek footballer who plays as a goalkeeper for Surkhon. Boymurodov participated in the 2023 FIFA U-20 World Cup. Became a champion with the Uzbekistan U-20 national team at the 2023 AFC U-20 Asian Cup.

== Playing career ==
On 7 July 2023, Boymurodov extended his contract with Pakhtakor and signed a new two-year deal.

== Honours ==
=== Club ===
Pakhtakor

- Uzbekistan Super League champion: 2023
- Uzbekistan Super Cup runner-up: 2023

Bukhara

- Uzbekistan Cup runner-up: 2025

=== International ===
- AFC U-20 Asian Cup champion: 2023
- Asian Games bronze medal: 2023

=== Individual ===
- AFC U-20 Asian Cup Best Goalkeeper: 2023

== Awards ==
- "Kelajak bunyodkori" medal
