= Mersad Seifi =

Iranian footballer (born 2003)

Personal information
- Date of birth: 11 August 2003 (age 23)
- Place of birth: Qaem Shahr, Iran
- Height: 1.70 m (5 ft 7 in)
- Position: Left-back

Team information
- Current team: Shabab Al Ahli
- Number: 23

Youth career
- 2021–2023: Nassaji

Senior career*
Years	Team	Apps	(Gls)
2023–2025	Nassaji	33	(1)
2025–	Shabab Al Ahli	4	(0)

International career^{‡}
2022	Iran U19	3	(0)
2022–2023	Iran U20	8	(0)
- * Club domestic league appearances and goals as of 17 April 2025 ‡ National team caps and goals as of 11 March 2023

Mersad Seifi (Persian: مرصاد سیفی; born 11 August 2003) is an Iranian professional footballer who plays as a defender for Shabab Al Ahli in the UAE Pro League.

== Club career ==
=== Nassaji Mazandaran ===
Seifi started football with his hometown team, Nassaji Mazandaran, and he made his debut for the team in the 25th fixtures of 2022–23 Persian Gulf Pro League against Foolad while he substituted in for Ali Shojaei.
