= 2023 AFC U-20 Asian Cup =

2023 yilgi U-20 Osiyo Kubogi

Tournament details
- Host country: Uzbekistan
- Dates: 1–18 March
- Teams: 16 (from 1 confederation)
- Venues: 4 (in 2 host cities)

Final positions
- Champions: Uzbekistan (1st title)
- Runners-up: Iraq

Tournament statistics
- Matches played: 31
- Goals scored: 69 (2.23 per match)
- Attendance: 203,176 (6,554 per match)
- Top scorer(s): (Japan) Naoki Kumata (5 goals)
- Best player: (Uzbekistan) Abbosbek Fayzullaev
- Best goalkeeper: (Uzbekistan) Otabek Boymurodov
- Fair play award: Uzbekistan

The 2023 AFC U-20 Asian Cup was the 41st edition of the AFC U-20 Asian Cup (including previous editions of the AFC Youth Championship and AFC U-19 Championship), the biennial international youth football championship organised by the Asian Football Confederation (AFC) for the men's under-20 national teams of Asia. This edition is the first to be played as an under-20 tournament, as the AFC proposed to switch the tournament from under-19 to under-20 starting from 2023. Moreover, the tournament was also rebranded from the "AFC U-19 Championship" to the "AFC U-20 Asian Cup". On 25 January 2021, the AFC announced that Uzbekistan would retain hosting rights for the 2023 edition after the cancellation of the 2020 AFC U-19 Championship due to the COVID-19 pandemic.

A total of 16 teams are playing in the tournament. The top four teams of the tournament, Japan, Iraq, South Korea and Uzbekistan, qualified for the 2023 FIFA U-20 World Cup as the AFC representatives besides Indonesia who automatically qualified as hosts. However, Indonesia was removed from hosting the tournament on 29 March 2023 and thus could not participate. Subsequently, FIFA awarded Argentina the rights to organize the 2023 FIFA U-20 World Cup in place of the original hosts Indonesia.

Saudi Arabia were the title holders, having won the title in 2018, but were eliminated from the group stage and thus failed to defend the title. Uzbekistan won the first-ever title after a 1–0 win over Iraq in the final.

== Qualification ==
Qualification matches were played between 10 and 18 September 2022.

=== Qualified teams ===
A total of 16 teams including hosts Uzbekistan qualified for the final tournament. Countries that initially qualified for the 2020 AFC U-19 Championship but missed out this edition included Bahrain, Cambodia, Laos, Malaysia, and Yemen. China and Jordan marked their return after initially failed to qualify in the previous edition. Kyrgyzstan qualified for the first time since 2006, Syria returned to the tournament since 2012, and Oman returned after the 2014 edition.

Team	Qualified as	Appearance	Previous best performance
Uzbekistan	Hosts	8th	Runners-up (2008)
Saudi Arabia	Group A winners	15th	Champions (1986, 1992, 2018)
Qatar	Group B winners	15th	Champions (2014)
Japan	Group C winners	38th	Champions (2016)
Jordan	Group D winners	8th	Fourth place (2006)
South Korea	Group E winners	39th	Champions (1959, 1960, 1963, 1978, 1980, 1982, 1990, 1996, 1998, 2002, 2004, 2012)
Indonesia	Group F winners	18th	Champions (1961)
Oman	Group G winners	3rd	Group stage (2000, 2014)
Australia	Group H winners	8th	Runners-up (2010)
Tajikistan	Group I winners	5th	Quarter-finalists (2016, 2018)
Iran	Group J winners	21st	Champions (1973, 1974, 1975, 1976)
Vietnam	Best runners-up	20th (Note: Between 1959 and 1974, Vietnam competed at AFC tournaments as South Vietnam. A separate North Vietnamese state did not join FIFA and they mostly played against other communist and communist-sympathising countries. The team's total appearances included eleven appearances as the South Vietnam national under-20 football team.)	Semi-finalists (2016)
Kyrgyzstan	2nd best runners-up	2nd	Group stage (2006)
China	3rd best runners-up	19th	Champions (1985)
Iraq	4th best runners-up	18th	Champions (1975, 1977, 1978, 1988, 2000)
Syria	5th best runners-up	11th	Champions (1994)

== Venues ==
The matches are being played on four venues at two cities across Uzbekistan.

Tashkent			Fergana
Milliy Stadium	JAR Stadium	Lokomotiv Stadium	Istiqlol Stadium
Capacity: 34,000	Capacity: 8,500	Capacity: 8,000	Capacity: 20,200
Host cities in Uzbekistan		Stadiums in Tashkent	

== Trophy ==
AFC has uploaded pictures of the new AFC U20 Asian Cup 2023 on their social media pages on 18 March 2023.

== Match officials ==
In February 2023, AFC announced a total of 13 referees (including one woman) and 15 assistant referees (including two women) appointed for the tournament.

Referees

- (Australia) Casey Reibelt
- (Bahrain) Ammar Mahfoodh
- (Chinese Taipei) Chen Hsin-chuan
- (Hong Kong) Tam Ping Wun
- (Iraq) Zaid Thamer
- (Kuwait) Abdullah Jamali
- (Malaysia) Nazmi Nasaruddin
- (Oman) Qasim Al-Hatmi
- (Saudi Arabia) Majed Al-Shamrani
- (South Korea) Kim Woo-sung
- (Tajikistan) Sadullo Gulmurodi
- (United Arab Emirates) Yahya Al-Mulla
- (Uzbekistan) Akhrol Risqullaev

Assistant referees

- (Bahrain) Faisal Al-Awi
- (Chinese Taipei) Chen Hsiao-en
- (Hong Kong) So Kai Man
- (Iran) Farhad Moravveji
- (Japan) Yosuke Takebe
- (Kyrgyzstan) Ramina Tsoi
- (Malaysia) Mohammad Bin Tan
- (Oman) Nasser Al-Busaidi
- (Pakistan) Ali Muhammad
- (Palestine) Heba Saadieh
- (Qatar) Faisal Al-Shammari
- (South Korea) Jang Jong-pil
- (Tajikistan) Vafo Karaev
- (United Arab Emirates) Ahmed Al-Rashdi
- (Uzbekistan) Sanjar Shayusupov

== Draw ==
The draw of the final tournament was held on 26 October 2022, 12:00 UZT (UTC+5), in Tashkent, Uzbekistan. The 16 teams were drawn into four groups of four teams, with the teams seeded according to their performance in the 2018 AFC U-19 Championship final tournament and qualification, with the hosts Uzbekistan automatically seeded and assigned to Position A1 in the draw.

Pot 1	Pot 2	Pot 3	Pot 4
1. Uzbekistan (hosts); 2. Saudi Arabia; 3. South Korea; 4. Qatar	5. Japan; 6. Tajikistan; 7. Australia; 8. Indonesia	9. Jordan; 10. China; 11. Iraq; 12. Vietnam	13. Iran; 14. Oman; 15. Syria; 16. Kyrgyzstan

== Squads ==
Players born on or after 1 January 2003 and on or before 31 December 2007 were eligible to compete in the tournament. Each team must register a squad of minimum 18 players and maximum 23 players, minimum three of whom must be goalkeepers.

== Group stage ==
The top two teams of each group advanced to the quarter-finals.

Tiebreakers

Teams were ranked according to points (3 points for a win, 1 point for a draw, 0 points for a loss), and if tied on points, the following tie-breaking criteria were applied, in the order given, to determine the rankings:

1. Points in head-to-head matches among tied teams;
2. Goal difference in head-to-head matches among tied teams;
3. Goals scored in head-to-head matches among tied teams;
4. If more than two teams are tied, and after applying all head-to-head criteria above, a subset of teams are still tied, all head-to-head criteria above are reapplied exclusively to this subset of teams;
5. Goal difference in all group matches;
6. Goals scored in all group matches;
7. Penalty shoot-out if only two teams were tied and they met in the last round of the group;
8. Disciplinary points (yellow card = 1 point, red card as a result of two yellow cards = 3 points, direct red card = 3 points, yellow card followed by direct red card = 4 points);
9. Drawing of lots.

All match times are in local time, UZT (UTC+5), as listed by AFC.

Schedule
Matchday	Dates	Matches
Matchday 1	1–3 March 2023	1 v 4, 2 v 3
Matchday 2	4–6 March 2023	2 v 4, 1 v 3
Matchday 3	7–9 March 2023	1 v 2, 3 v 4

=== Group A ===
Pos	Team	Pld	W	D	L	GF	GA	GD	Pts	Qualification
1	Uzbekistan (H)	3	2	1	0	3	0	+3	7	Knockout stage
2	Iraq	3	1	1	1	3	2	+1	4	Knockout stage
3	Indonesia	3	1	1	1	1	2	−1	4	
4	Syria	3	0	1	2	1	4	−3	1	

Source: AFC
Rules for classification: Group stage tiebreakers
(H) Hosts
1 March 2023
17:00

Indonesia	0–2	Iraq
	Report	Abdulkareem 28'; Jameel 90+6'

Lokomotiv Stadium, Tashkent
Attendance: 120
Referee: Sadullo Gulmurodi (Tajikistan)
1 March 2023
19:00

Uzbekistan	2–0	Syria
Fayzullaev 37'; Al Ramadan 68' (o.g.)	Report

Milliy Stadium, Tashkent
Attendance: 32,757
Referee: Nazmi Nasaruddin (Malaysia)

4 March 2023
17:00

Syria	0–1	Indonesia
	Report	Hokky 35'

Lokomotiv Stadium, Tashkent
Attendance: 95
Referee: Majed Al-Shamrani (Saudi Arabia)
4 March 2023
19:00

Iraq	0–1	Uzbekistan
	Report	Kholdorkhonov 17'

Milliy Stadium, Tashkent
Attendance: 32,218
Referee: Yahya Al-Mulla (United Arab Emirates)

7 March 2023
19:00

Uzbekistan	0–0	Indonesia
	Report

Istiqlol Stadium, Fergana
Attendance: 18,006
Referee: Majed Al-Shamrani (Saudi Arabia)
7 March 2023
19:00

Iraq	1–1	Syria
Abdulkareem 17'	Report	Al Ramadan 90+5'

Lokomotiv Stadium, Tashkent
Attendance: 93
Referee: Ammar Mahfoodh (Bahrain)

=== Group B ===
Pos	Team	Pld	W	D	L	GF	GA	GD	Pts	Qualification
1	Iran	3	2	0	1	6	4	+2	6 (Note: Head-to-head goal differences: Iran +1, Australia 0, Vietnam –1.)	Knockout stage
2	Australia	3	2	0	1	12	4	+8	6	Knockout stage
3	Vietnam	3	2	0	1	4	4	0	6	
4	Qatar	3	0	0	3	2	12	−10	0	

Source: AFC
Rules for classification: Group stage tiebreakers
Notes:
1 March 2023
15:00

Australia	0–1	Vietnam
	Report	Nguyễn Quốc Việt 6'

Istiqlol Stadium, Fergana
Attendance: 5,715
Referee: Chen Hsin-chuan (Chinese Taipei)
1 March 2023
19:00

Qatar	0–1	Iran
	Report	Hazbavi 65' (pen.)

Istiqlol Stadium, Fergana
Attendance: 6,120
Referee: Kim Woo-sung (South Korea)

4 March 2023
15:00

Iran	2–3	Australia
Eslamtalab 25'; Enayatzadeh 80'	Report	Simmons 8'; Segecic 19', 46'

Istiqlol Stadium, Fergana
Attendance: 1,154
Referee: Nazmi Nasaruddin (Malaysia)
4 March 2023
19:00

Vietnam	2–1	Qatar
Nguyễn Quốc Việt 45+2'; Nguyễn Văn Trường 90'	Report	Al-Rawi 84' (pen.)

Istiqlol Stadium, Fergana
Attendance: 1,024
Referee: Akhrol Risqullaev (Uzbekistan)

7 March 2023
15:00

Qatar	1–9	Australia
Asar 2'	Report	Al-Ghareeb 13' (o.g.); Donnell 21'; Raphael 25'; Bernardo 39', 67'; Yull 76'; Popovic 79'; Goodwin 90'; Badolato 90+2'

JAR Stadium, Tashkent
Attendance: 123
Referee: Nazmi Nasaruddin (Malaysia)
7 March 2023
15:00

Vietnam	1–3	Iran
Khuất Văn Khang 56'	Report	Hazbavi 36'; Saharkhizan 75'; Hosseinnezhad 90+4'

Istiqlol Stadium, Fergana
Attendance: 982
Referee: Abdullah Jamali (Kuwait)

=== Group C ===
Pos	Team	Pld	W	D	L	GF	GA	GD	Pts	Qualification
1	South Korea	3	2	1	0	6	0	+6	7	Knockout stage
2	Jordan	3	1	1	1	2	2	0	4	Knockout stage
3	Tajikistan	3	1	1	1	1	2	−1	4	
4	Oman	3	0	1	2	0	5	−5	1	

Source: AFC
Rules for classification: Group stage tiebreakers
2 March 2023
15:00

South Korea	4–0	Oman
Kim Yong-hak 30'; Sung Jin-young 34', 58'; Kang Seong-jin 90+1'	Report

JAR Stadium, Tashkent
Attendance: 53
Referee: Akhrol Risqullaev (Uzbekistan)
2 March 2023
17:00

Tajikistan	0–2	Jordan
	Report	Azaizeh 7'; Darwish 25'

Lokomotiv Stadium, Tashkent
Attendance: 253
Referee: Yahya Al-Mulla (United Arab Emirates)

5 March 2023
15:00

Jordan	0–2	South Korea
	Report	Bae Jun-ho 65'; Kang Seong-jin 71'

JAR Stadium, Tashkent
Attendance: 221
Referee: Casey Reibelt (Australia)
5 March 2023
17:00

Oman	0–1	Tajikistan
	Report	Kamolov 80'

Lokomotiv Stadium, Tashkent
Attendance: 80
Referee: Tam Ping Wun (Hong Kong)

8 March 2023
17:00

South Korea	0–0	Tajikistan
	Report

Milliy Stadium, Tashkent
Attendance: 318
Referee: Chen Hsin-chuan (Chinese Taipei)
8 March 2023
17:00

Jordan	0–0	Oman
	Report

Lokomotiv Stadium, Tashkent
Attendance: 30
Referee: Yahya Al-Mulla (United Arab Emirates)

=== Group D ===
Pos	Team	Pld	W	D	L	GF	GA	GD	Pts	Qualification
1	Japan	3	3	0	0	7	2	+5	9	Knockout stage
2	China	3	1	1	1	4	3	+1	4	Knockout stage
3	Saudi Arabia	3	1	0	2	2	4	−2	3	
4	Kyrgyzstan	3	0	1	2	1	5	−4	1	

Source: AFC
Rules for classification: Group stage tiebreakers
3 March 2023
17:00

Saudi Arabia	1–0	Kyrgyzstan
Radif 50' (pen.)	Report

Milliy Stadium, Tashkent
Attendance: 587
Referee: Qasim Al-Hatmi (Oman)
3 March 2023
15:00

Japan	2–1	China
Kumata 66', 70'	Report	Tanaka 6' (o.g.)

JAR Stadium, Tashkent
Attendance: 251
Referee: Zaid Thamer (Iraq)

6 March 2023
15:00

Kyrgyzstan	0–3	Japan
	Report	Sano 73' (pen.); Kumata 75'; Sakamoto 85'

JAR Stadium, Tashkent
Attendance: 287
Referee: Chen Hsin-chuan (Chinese Taipei)
6 March 2023
17:00

China	2–0	Saudi Arabia
Mutellip 65'; Xu Bin 72'	Report

Milliy Stadium, Tashkent
Attendance: 325
Referee: Yahya Al-Mulla (United Arab Emirates)

9 March 2023
17:00

Saudi Arabia	1–2	Japan
Jawshan 74'	Report	Matsuki 15', 78'

Lokomotiv Stadium, Tashkent
Attendance: 143
Referee: Nazmi Nasaruddin (Malaysia)
9 March 2023
17:00

China	1–1	Kyrgyzstan
M. Bekberdinov 58' (o.g.)	Report	Zhenishbekov 87'

JAR Stadium, Tashkent
Attendance: 235
Referee: Abdullah Jamali (Kuwait)

== Knockout stage ==
In the knockout stage, extra time and penalty shoot-out are used to decide the winner if necessary.

=== Bracket ===
Quarter-finals
11 March – Tashkent (Milliy)
Uzbekistan (p)	1 (5)
Australia	1 (4)
12 March – Tashkent (JAR)
South Korea (a.e.t.)	3
China	1
11 March – Tashkent (JAR)
Iran	0
Iraq	1
12 March – Tashkent (Lokomotiv)
Japan	2
Jordan	0

Semi-finals
15 March – Tashkent (Milliy)
Uzbekistan (p)	0 (3)
South Korea	0 (1)
15 March – Tashkent (JAR)
Iraq (p)	2 (5)
Japan	2 (3)

Final
18 March – Tashkent (Milliy)
Uzbekistan	1
Iraq	0

=== Quarter-finals ===
Winners qualified for the 2023 FIFA U-20 World Cup.

11 March 2023
15:00

Iran	0–1	Iraq
	Report	Jasim 90+1'

JAR Stadium, Tashkent
Attendance: 178
Referee: Nazmi Nasaruddin (Malaysia)

11 March 2023
19:00

Uzbekistan	1–1 (a.e.t.)	Australia
Abdurakhmatov 79'	Report	Popovic 77'
Penalties
Fayzullaev (penalty scored); Kholdorkhonov (penalty scored); Abdurazzoqov (penalty scored); Makhamadjonov (penalty scored); Rahmonaliyev (penalty scored)	5–4	(penalty scored) Triantis; (penalty scored) Goodwin; (penalty scored) Rawlins; (penalty scored) Badolato; (penalty missed) Segecic

Milliy Stadium, Tashkent
Attendance: 33,494
Referee: Ammar Mahfoodh (Bahrain)

12 March 2023
15:00

South Korea	3–1 (a.e.t.)	China
Kim Yong-hak 62' (pen.); Sung Jin-young 100'; Choi Seok-hyun 105'	Report	Mutellip 48'

JAR Stadium, Tashkent
Attendance: 467
Referee: Yahya Al-Mulla (United Arab Emirates)

12 March 2023
19:00

Japan	2–0	Jordan
Sakamoto 54'; Kumata 70'	Report

Lokomotiv Stadium, Tashkent
Attendance: 163
Referee: Majed Al-Shamrani (Saudi Arabia)

=== Semi-finals ===
15 March 2023
15:00

Iraq	2–2 (a.e.t.)	Japan
Jasim 12'; Jameel 103'	Report	Einaga 83'; Kumata 118'
Penalties
Ali (penalty scored); Mahdi (penalty scored); Jasim (penalty scored); Raad (penalty scored); Qasim (penalty scored)	5–3	(penalty scored) Kumata; (penalty missed) Sano; (penalty scored) Takahashi; (penalty scored) Kitano

JAR Stadium, Tashkent
Attendance: 251
Referee: Ammar Mahfoodh (Bahrain)

15 March 2023
19:00

Uzbekistan	0–0 (a.e.t.)	South Korea
	Report
Penalties
Fayzullaev (penalty scored); Makhamadjonov (penalty scored); Abdurakhmatov (penalty scored)	3–1	(penalty missed) Kang Seong-jin; (penalty missed) Kang Sang-yoon; (penalty scored) Park Chang-woo; (penalty missed) Kim Ji-soo

Milliy Stadium, Tashkent
Attendance: 33,977
Referee: Abdullah Jamali (Kuwait)

=== Final ===
18 March 2023
19:00

Uzbekistan	1–0	Iraq
Rahmonaliyev 72' (pen.)	Report

Milliy Stadium, Tashkent
Attendance: 33,834
Referee: Nazmi Nasaruddin (Malaysia)

== Winners ==
2023 AFC U-20 Asian Cup

Uzbekistan
First title

== Awards ==
The following awards were given at the conclusion of the tournament:

Top Goalscorer	Most Valuable Player	Best Goalkeeper
(Japan) Naoki Kumata	(Uzbekistan) Abbosbek Fayzullaev	(Uzbekistan) Otabek Boymurodov

== Goalscorers ==
There were 69 goals scored in 31 matches, for an average of 2.23 goals per match.

5 goals

- (Japan) Naoki Kumata

3 goals

- (South Korea) Sung Jin-young

2 goals

- (Australia) Bernardo Oliveira
- (Australia) Gabriel Popovic
- (Australia) Adrian Segecic
- (China) Mutellip Iminqari
- (Iran) Amin Hazbavi
- (Iraq) Hayder Abdulkareem
- (Iraq) Mohammed Jameel
- (Iraq) Ali Jasim
- (Japan) Kuryu Matsuki
- (Japan) Isa Sakamoto
- (South Korea) Kang Seong-jin
- (South Korea) Kim Yong-hak
- (Vietnam) Nguyễn Quốc Việt

1 goal

- (Australia) Alex Badolato
- (Australia) Raphael Borges Rodrigues
- (Australia) Chris Donnell
- (Australia) Archie Goodwin
- (Australia) Aidan Simmons
- (Australia) Jonny Yull
- (China) Xu Bin
- (Indonesia) Hokky Caraka
- (Iran) Alireza Enayatzadeh
- (Iran) Amirreza Eslamtalab
- (Iran) Mohammadjavad Hosseinnezhad
- (Iran) Saeid Saharkhizan
- (Japan) Takatora Einaga
- (Japan) Kodai Sano
- (Jordan) Ali Azaizeh
- (Jordan) Seif Darwish
- (Kyrgyzstan) Biimyrza Zhenishbekov
- (Qatar) Ahmed Al-Rawi
- (Qatar) Moustafa Asar
- (Saudi Arabia) Yazeed Jawshan
- (Saudi Arabia) Abdullah Radif
- (South Korea) Bae Jun-ho
- (South Korea) Choi Seok-hyun
- (Syria) Zakaria Al Ramadan
- (Tajikistan) Amadoni Kamolov
- (Uzbekistan) Zafarmurod Abdurakhmatov
- (Uzbekistan) Abbosbek Fayzullaev
- (Uzbekistan) Kholdorkhonov
- (Uzbekistan) Umarali Rahmonaliyev
- (Vietnam) Khuất Văn Khang
- (Vietnam) Nguyễn Văn Trường

1 own goal

- (Japan) Hayato Tanaka (against China)
- (Kyrgyzstan) Mirlan Bekberdinov (against China)
- (Qatar) Hassan Al-Ghareeb (against Australia)
- (Syria) Zakaria Al Ramadan (against Uzbekistan)

== Discipline ==
A player or team official was automatically suspended for the next match for the following offences:

- Receiving a red card (red card suspensions could be extended for serious offences)
- Receiving two yellow cards in two matches; yellow cards expired after the completion of the quarter-finals (yellow card suspensions were not carried forward to any other future international matches)

The following suspensions were served during the tournament:

Player/Official	Offence(s)	Suspension(s)
(Iraq) Charbel Shamoon	(red card) in Group A vs Indonesia (matchday 1; 1 March)	Group A vs Uzbekistan (matchday 2; 4 March)
(Jordan) Baker Kalbouneh	(red card) in Group C vs Tajikistan (matchday 1; 2 March)	Group C vs South Korea (matchday 2; 5 March)
(Iran) Erfan Ghorbani	(yellow card) in Group B vs Qatar (matchday 1; 1 March); (yellow card) in Group B vs Australia (matchday 2; 4 March)	Group B vs Vietnam (matchday 3; 7 March)
(Uzbekistan) Shakhzodbek Rahmatullayev	(red card) in Group A vs Iraq (matchday 2; 4 March)	Group A vs Indonesia (matchday 3; 7 March)
(Qatar) Younis Mohammed	(yellow card) in Group B vs Iran (matchday 1; 1 March); (yellow card) in Group B vs Vietnam (matchday 2; 4 March)	Group B vs Australia (matchday 3; 7 March)
(Jordan) Yousef Hassan Hussein	(yellow card) in Group C vs Tajikistan (matchday 1; 2 March); (yellow card) in Group C vs South Korea (matchday 2; 5 March)	Group C vs Oman (matchday 3; 8 March)
(Oman) Turki Bait Rabia	(yellow card) in Group C vs South Korea (matchday 1; 2 March); (yellow card) in Group C vs Tajikistan (matchday 2; 5 March)	Group C vs Jordan (matchday 3; 8 March)
(China) Chen Zhexuan	(yellow card) in Group D vs Japan (matchday 1; 3 March); (yellow card) in Group D vs Kyrgyzstan (matchday 3; 9 March)	Quarter-finals vs South Korea (quarter-finals; 12 March)
(China) Behram Abduweli	(yellow card) in Group D vs Saudi Arabia (matchday 2; 6 March); (yellow card) in Group D vs Kyrgyzstan (matchday 3; 9 March)	Quarter-finals vs South Korea (quarter-finals; 12 March)
(Japan) Kosuke Matsumura	(yellow card) in Group D vs Kyrgyzstan (matchday 2; 6 March); (yellow card) in Group D vs Saudi Arabia (matchday 3; 9 March)	Quarter-finals vs Jordan (quarter-finals; 12 March)

== Qualified teams for FIFA U-20 World Cup ==
The following four teams from AFC qualified for the 2023 FIFA U-20 World Cup in Argentina.

Team	Qualified on	Previous appearances in FIFA U-20 World Cup^{1}
Iraq	11 March 2023	4 (1977, 1989, 2001, 2013)
Uzbekistan	11 March 2023	4 (2003, 2009, 2013, 2015)
South Korea	12 March 2023	15 (1979, 1981, 1983, 1991, 1993, 1997, 1999, 2003, 2005, 2007, 2009, 2011, 2013, 2017, 2019)
Japan	12 March 2023	10 (1979, 1995, 1997, 1999, 2001, 2003, 2005, 2007, 2017, 2019)

^{1} Bold indicates champions for that year. Italic indicates hosts for that year.

== See also ==
- 2023 AFC U-17 Asian Cup
- 2024 AFC U-23 Asian Cup qualification
