= Afghan Women United =

Football club representing the Afghan diaspora

Afghanistan
- Nickname: Afghan Women United
- Confederation: AFC (Asia)
- Sub-confederation: CAFA (Central Asia)
- Head coach: Pauline Hamill
- FIFA code: AFG
Home colours	Away colours

FIFA ranking
- Current: NR (16 June 2026)

First international
- Unofficial (Afghanistan) Afghan Women 1–6 Chad (Berrechid, Morocco; 26 October 2025) As FIFA-recognized national team Cook Islands 1–0 Afghan Women (Afghanistan) (Auckland, New Zealand; 4 June 2026)

Biggest win
- Unofficial; Libya 0–7 Afghan Women (Afghanistan) (Berrechid, Morocco; 1 November 2025) As FIFA-recognized national team None

Biggest defeat
- Unofficial (Afghanistan) Afghan Women 1–6 Chad (Berrechid, Morocco; 26 October 2025) As FIFA-recognized national team Cook Islands 3–0 Afghan Women (Afghanistan) (Auckland, New Zealand; 8 June 2026) Note: Post-Islamic Republic only

Afghan Women United or Afghan Women is a women's football selection team sanctioned by FIFA which represents the Afghan diaspora.

The team was formed following the Taliban takeover of Afghanistan in 2021 and the subsequent abolishment of the official women's national team by the Afghanistan Football Federation.

== History ==
=== 2021 exodus ===
Tha Afghanistan Football Federation (AFF) organized a women's national football team during the Islamic Republic era. That national team played their last official match, a 5–0 loss to Tajikistan, on 1 December 2018 at the 2018 CAFA Women's Championship.

However following the takeover of Afghanistan by the Taliban in August 2021, the national team players were evacuated out of the country. The Taliban has banned women's sports in the country including football.

In March 2022, the exiled national team was admitted into Football Victoria in Australia as Melbourne Victory FC AWT. In May 2022, an Afghan development side played a friendly against non-FIFA team Surrey in Dorking, England.

The Afghanistan Football Federation (AFF) has refused to recognize a women's national team; either consisting of diaspora or local players. Nevertheless, Afghan women has urged FIFA to allow them to play as a national team independent from the AFF.

=== Formation ===
In May 2025, FIFA sanctioned the creation of a Afghanistan women's refugee team which would be allowed to compete in official tournaments. The program was due to run for one year under a pilot phase. Pauline Hamill was appointed as head coach and was tasked to hold three identification camps prior to playing FIFA-approved friendlies in late 2025. Reportedly they were still unable to compete in international competitions.

=== FIFA Unites: Women's Series ===
The Afghanistan refugee team, also known as Afghan Women United, made their debut in the four-nation "FIFA Unites: Women's Series" friendly tournament, originally scheduled to be held in the United Arab Emirates. However, the UAE refused to issue visas to the Afghan players and the tournament was moved to Morocco. They played against Chad, Tunisia, and Libya and finished as third placers.

=== FIFA recognition as a national team ===
The team became eligible to represent Afghanistan starting from April 2026 following a meeting from the FIFA Council. Afghan Women United played two friendly matches against the Cook Islands in June 2026, losing 1–0 and 3–0.

== Results and fixtures ==
=== 2025 ===
26 October 2025 FIFA Unites: Women's Series	Afghan Women (Afghanistan)	1–6	Chad	Berrechid, Morocco
17:00 UTC+1	Noori 4' (pen.)		Djoïtana 44'; Abdoulaye 53'; Dallou 60', 73'; Larkingam 62', 81'	Stadium: Berrechid Municipal Stadium

29 October 2025 FIFA Unites: Women's Series	Tunisia	4–0	(Afghanistan) Afghan Women	Berrechid, Morocco
20:00 UTC+1	Marzouki 7'; Mejri 11'; Abbassi 68'; Ammar 74'			Stadium: Berrechid Municipal Stadium

1 November 2025 FIFA Unites: Women's Series	Libya	0–7	(Afghanistan) Afghan Women	Berrechid, Morocco
17:00 UTC+1			Ali 4', 12'; Amini 18' (pen.); N. Mohammadi 54'; Noori 64'; S. Mohammadi 70'; Haidari 83'	Stadium: Berrechid Municipal Stadium

=== 2026 ===
4 June 2026 Friendly	Cook Islands	1–0	(Afghanistan) Afghan Women	Auckland, New Zealand
	(?) Teupoko Tuariki	Report

8 June 2026 Friendly	Cook Islands	3–0	(Afghanistan) Afghan Women	Auckland, New Zealand
		Report

== Current squad ==
The following players are part of Afghan Women United as of 15 May 2026 and were expected to play in international friendlies against the Cook Islands on 4 and 8 June 2026.

No.	Pos.	Player	Date of birth (age)	Club
	GK	Montaha Moslih		(Football Australia) Bentleigh Greens
	GK	Fatima Yousufi	14 January 2002 (age 24)	(Football Australia) South Melbourne
	GK	Elaha Safdari		(The Football Association) Doncaster Rovers Belles
	DF	Kareshma Abasi		(Football Australia) Bundoora United
	DF	Najma Arefi		(The Football Association) Kiveton Park
	DF	Khursand Azizi		(Football Australia) Southern United
	DF	Susan Khojasta		(Italian Football Federation) Chiesanuova 1975
	DF	Bahara Kohstiani		(Football Australia) Eltham Redbacks
	DF	Sabreya Rajabi		(German Football Association) Sternschanze
	DF	Mursal Sadat		(Football Australia) Eltham Redbacks
	MF	Mina Ahmadi		(Football Australia) Nepean
	MF	Mona Johini		(Football Australia) Nepean
	MF	Maryam Karimyar		(Portuguese Football Federation) São Romão
	MF	Tahera Mohammadi		(Football Australia) Brunswick Juventus
	MF	Zainab Mozaffari		(The Football Association) Retford
	MF	Razia Noori		(Football Australia) Southern United
	MF	Manizah Sadat		(Football Australia) Brunswick Juventus
	MF	Fatema Urfani		(Portuguese Football Federation) Estoril Praia
	FW	Sevin Azimi		Unattached
	FW	Fatima Haidari		Unattached
	FW	Nilab Mohammadi		(Football Australia) Southern United
	FW	Sosan Mohammadi		(The Football Association) Kiveton Park
	FW	Manozh Noori	11 March 2003 (age 23)	(Football Australia) Spring Hills

== Coaching history ==
Name	Period	Matches	Wins	Draws	Losses	Winning %
(Scotland) Pauline Hamill	2025–	5	1	0	4	20%

== Competitive record ==
=== FIFA Women's World Cup ===
FIFA Women's World Cup record									Qualification record					
Year	Round	Position	Pld	W	D	L	GF	GA	Pld	W	D	L	GF	GA
(Brazil) 2027	Ineligible to qualify								Ineligible to qualify					
(Costa Rica) (Jamaica) (Mexico) (United States) 2031	To be determined								To be determined					
(England) (Northern Ireland) (Scotland) (Wales) 2035	To be determined								To be determined					
Total	—	0/10	—	—	—	—	—	—	—	—	—	—	—	—

=== Summer Olympics ===
Summer Olympics record									Qualification record					
Year	Round	Position	Pld	W	D	L	GF	GA	Pld	W	D	L	GF	GA
(United States) 2028	Ineligible to qualify								Ineligible to qualify					
Total	—	0/8	—	—	—	—	—	—	—	—	—	—	—	—

=== AFC Women's Asian Cup ===
AFC Women's Asian Cup record									Qualification record					
Year	Round	Position	Pld	W	D	L	GF	GA	Pld	W	D	L	GF	GA
(Australia) 2026	Ineligible to qualify								Ineligible to qualify					
Total	—	0/21	—	—	—	—	—	—	—	—	—	—	—	—

=== SAFF Women's Championship ===
SAFF Women's Championship record
Year	Result	GP	W	D*	L	GS	GA	GD
(India) 2026	Did not enter							
Total	0/7	—	—	—	—	—	—	—

*Denotes draws includes knockout matches decided on penalty kicks.

== Honours ==
- FIFA Unites Women's Series

(bronze) Third Place: 2025

== See also ==
- Afghan Women's XI, an Afghan refugee cricket team
- Defection of Iran women's national football team
