= 2021 CAFA U-20 Women's Championship =

Tournament details
- Host country: Tajikistan
- City: Dushanbe
- Dates: 11–17 June
- Teams: 5 (from 1 sub-confederation)
- Venue: 1 (in 1 host city)

Final positions
- Champions: Uzbekistan (1st title)
- Runners-up: Iran
- Third place: Kyrgyzstan
- Fourth place: Afghanistan

Tournament statistics
- Matches played: 10
- Goals scored: 50 (5 per match)
- Attendance: 0 (0 per match)
- Top scorer(s): (Uzbekistan) Jasmina Abduganeiva (7 goals)
- Best player: (Iran) Negin Zandi
- Fair play award: Tajikistan

The 2021 CAFA U-20 Women's Championship was the inaugural edition of the CAFA U-20 Women's Championship, the international youth Women's football championship organized by the CAFA contested by the women's under-20 national teams of Central Asia. The tournament was hosted by Tajikistan between 11 and 17 June 2021.

Uzbekistan won the title to become the first CAFA U-20 Women's Championship champion, edging out IR Iran after a dramatic final day which ended by a tie that led the Uzbek Team to top the standing on goal difference.

== Participating nations ==
A total of 5 (out of 6) CAFA member national teams entered the tournament.

| Team | Appearance | Previous best performance |
|---|---|---|
| Afghanistan | 1st | —N/a |
| Iran | 1st | —N/a |
| Kyrgyzstan | 1st | —N/a |
| Tajikistan | 1st | —N/a |
| Uzbekistan | 1st | —N/a |

Did not enter

- Turkmenistan

== Venues ==
Matches were held at the Republican Central Stadium.

| Dushanbe | 2021 CAFA U-20 Women's Championship (Tajikistan) |
| Republic Central Stadium | 2021 CAFA U-20 Women's Championship (Tajikistan) |
| Capacity: 20,000 | 2021 CAFA U-20 Women's Championship (Tajikistan) |

== Match officials ==
Referees

- (Afghanistan) Yasmin Haidari
- (Iran) Fatemeh Nasiri
- (Kyrgyzstan) Malika Kadirova
- (Tajikistan) Nodira Mirzoeva
- (Uzbekistan) Roziabonu Yusupova

Assistant referees

- (Afghanistan) Farishta Shaikhmiri
- (Iran) Habibeh Rabavganjinehketab
- (Kyrgyzstan) Ramina Tsoi
- (Tajikistan) Munisa Mirzoeva

== Main tournament ==
The main tournament schedule was announced on 4 June 2021.

| Pos | Team | Pld | W | D | L | GF | GA | GD | Pts | Final result |
|---|---|---|---|---|---|---|---|---|---|---|
| 1 | Uzbekistan | 4 | 3 | 1 | 0 | 23 | 4 | +19 | 10 | Champions |
| 2 | Iran | 4 | 3 | 1 | 0 | 17 | 3 | +14 | 10 | Runners-up |
| 3 | Kyrgyzstan | 4 | 2 | 0 | 2 | 8 | 7 | +1 | 6 | Third place |
| 4 | Afghanistan | 4 | 1 | 0 | 3 | 1 | 22 | −21 | 3 | |
| 5 | Tajikistan (H) | 4 | 0 | 0 | 4 | 1 | 14 | −13 | 0 | |

Updated to match(es) played on unknown. Source: CAFA
Rules for classification: Tiebreakers
(H) Hosts
11 June 2021
18:00

| Uzbekistan | 11–0 | Afghanistan |
|---|---|---|
| Oktyabryeva 23', 54'; Mamatkarimova 29'; Ibrokhimova 31'; Rashidova 40'; Rustullaeva 57'; Bobokulova 66', 81'; Abduganieva 79', 85', 88' | Report |

Republican Central Stadium, Dushanbe
Attendance: 0
Referee: Nodira Mirzoeva (Tajikistan)
11 June 2021
21:00

| Iran | 3–0 | Tajikistan |
|---|---|---|
| Shaban 2'; Erfani 47'; Zandi 67' | Report |

Republican Central Stadium, Dushanbe
Attendance: 0

12 June 2021
18:00

| Uzbekistan | 3–1 | Kyrgyzstan |
|---|---|---|
| Abduganieva 22', 71'; Rustullaeva 51' | Report | Duishobaeva 45+1' |

Republican Central Stadium, Dushanbe
Attendance: 0
Referee: Yasmin Haidari (Afghanistan)
12 June 2021
21:00

| Tajikistan | 0–1 | Afghanistan |
|---|---|---|
| | Report | Foladi 17' |

Republican Central Stadium, Dushanbe
Attendance: 0
Referee: Fatemeh Nasiri (IR Iran)

14 June 2021
18:00

| Afghanistan | 0–8 | Iran |
|---|---|---|
| | Report | Nasab 15', 86'; Zolfi 24'; Foroozandeh 26'; Katehsari 47'; Didar 55'; Mohammadichenari 71'; Pasandideh 80' |

Republican Central Stadium, Dushanbe
Attendance: 0
14 June 2021
21:00

| Tajikistan | 0–3 | Kyrgyzstan |
|---|---|---|
| | Report | Kaznacheeva 5'; Duishobaeva 23', 45' |

Republican Central Stadium, Dushanbe
Attendance: 0
Referee: Fatemeh Nasiri (IR Iran)

15 June 2021
18:00

| Kyrgyzstan | 3–0 | Afghanistan |
|---|---|---|
| Kaznacheeva 5'; Duishobaeva 72'; Ermamatova 82' | Report |

Republican Central Stadium, Dushanbe
Attendance: 0
15 June 2021
21:00

| Uzbekistan | 2–2 | Iran |
|---|---|---|
| Mamatkarimova 30', 47' | Report | Erfani 20'; Zandi 66' |

Republican Central Stadium, Dushanbe
Attendance: 0
Referee: Malika Kadirova (Kyrgyz Republic)

17 June 2021
18:00

| Iran | 4–1 | Kyrgyzstan |
|---|---|---|
| Foroozandeh 7'; Zandi 30'; Katehsari 58'; Nasab 80' | Report | Duishobaeva 45+1' |

Republican Central Stadium, Dushanbe
Attendance: 0
Referee: Roziabonu Yusupova (Uzbekistan)
17 June 2021
21:00

| Tajikistan | 1–7 | Uzbekistan |
|---|---|---|
| Salimova 88' | Report | Khatamova 3'; Abduganieva 13', 27'; Rustullaeva 35'; Zaynitdinova 45+1', 47'; Rashidova 63' |

Republican Central Stadium, Dushanbe
Attendance: 0
Referee: Fatemeh Nasiri (IR Iran)

== Goalscorers ==
There were 50 goals scored in 10 matches, for an average of 5 goals per match.

7 goals

- (Uzbekistan) Jasmina Abduganieva

5 goals

- (Kyrgyzstan) Adinai Duishobaeva

3 goals

- (Iran) Roghayeh Nasab
- (Iran) Negin Zandi
- (Uzbekistan) Leyla Rustullaeva
- (Uzbekistan) Zarina Mamatkarimova

2 goals

- (Iran) Hasti Foroozandeh
- (Iran) Seyedeh Katehsari
- (Iran) Zohreh Erfani
- (Kyrgyzstan) Tatiana Kaznacheeva
- (Uzbekistan) Shakhrizoda Zaynitdinova
- (Uzbekistan) Sabrina Oktyabryeva
- (Uzbekistan) Albina Bobokulova
- (Uzbekistan) Tojinisokhon Rashidova

1 goal

- (Afghanistan) Zahra Foladi
- (Iran) Fatemeh Shaban Ghohrood
- (Iran) Mohaddeseh Zolfi
- (Iran) Sara Didar
- (Iran) Maryam Mohammadichenari
- (Iran) Fatemeh Pasandideh
- (Kyrgyzstan) Fatima Ermamatova
- (Tajikistan) Sabrina Salimova
- (Uzbekistan) Umida Khatamova
- (Uzbekistan) Gulchiroy Ibrokhimova

Source: CAFA

== Player awards ==
The following awards were given at the conclusion of the tournament:

| Top Goalscorer | Best player | Fair Play award | Special award |
|---|---|---|---|
| (Uzbekistan) Jasmina Abduganieva (7 goals) | (Iran) Negin Zandi | Tajikistan | Afghanistan |
