= 2020 CAFA U-19 Women's Futsal Championship =

CAFA U-19 Women's Futsal Championship 2020
Tournament details
- Host country: Tajikistan
- City: Dushanbe
- Dates: 24–29 January
- Teams: 6 (from 1 confederation)
- Venue: 1 (in 1 host city)

Final positions
- Champions: Iran (1st title)
- Runners-up: Uzbekistan
- Third place: Turkmenistan
- Fourth place: Kyrgyzstan

Tournament statistics
- Matches played: 15
- Goals scored: 110 (7.33 per match)
- Attendance: 1,551 (103 per match)
- Top scorer(s): (Iran) Roghaye Someye (18 goals)
- Best player: (Iran) Maral Torkaman
- Fair play award: Turkmenistan

The 2020 CAFA U-19 Women's Futsal Championship was the first edition of the CAFA U-19 Women's Futsal Championship, the international youth futsal championship organized by the CAFA for the women's under-19 national teams of Central Asia. Tajikistan hosted the tournament from 24 to 29 January 2022. All CAFA six members' teams played in the tournament, with players born on or after 1 January 2001 eligible to participate.

Iran won the title undefeated to become the first CAFA U-19 Women's Futsal Championship champion. Host Tajikistan finished fifth tied on points with sixth-place Afghanistan.

== Participating teams ==
All 6 CAFA nations entered the competition.

Team	Appearance	Previous best performance	Ref.
Afghanistan	1st	—N/a	
Iran	1st	—N/a	
Kyrgyzstan	1st	—N/a	
Tajikistan	1st	—N/a	
Turkmenistan	1st	—N/a	
Uzbekistan	1st	—N/a	

== Match officials ==
The following officials were appointed for the tournament:

Referees

- (Afghanistan) Mohammad Tamim Hussaini
- (Afghanistan) Mohammad Latif Sharifi
- (Iran) Fariba Kaabi Kermanshai
- (Iran) Fahimeh Fatahi
- (Kyrgyzstan) Talantbek Raimberdiev
- (Kyrgyzstan) Eldiiar Keldibekov
- (Tajikistan) Behruz Murtazoev
- (Tajikistan) Suhrob Sattorov
- (Turkmenistan) Timur Ramazanov
- (Turkmenistan) Halida Eshniyazova
- (Uzbekistan) Askarbay Arzibekov
- (Uzbekistan) Nikita Afinogenov

== Main Tournament ==
The tournament schedule was announced on 8 January 2020, with kickoff times confirmed on 20 January 2020.

All times are local TJT (UTC+5).

Pos	Team	Pld	W	D	L	GF	GA	GD	Pts	Final result
1	Iran	5	5	0	0	52	2	+50	15	Champions
2	Uzbekistan	5	4	0	1	22	14	+8	12	Runners-up
3	Turkmenistan	5	3	0	2	15	19	−4	9	Third place
4	Kyrgyzstan	5	2	0	3	10	11	−1	6	
5	Tajikistan (H)	5	0	1	4	7	30	−23	1	
6	Afghanistan	5	0	1	4	4	34	−30	1	

Source: CAFA
Rules for classification: 1) Points; 2) head-to-head matches; 3) Goal difference; 4) Number of goals scored.
(H) Hosts
24 January 2020
12:00

Kyrgyzstan	3–0	Afghanistan
Askarova 12'; Yrysbek Kyzy 33'; Kohistani 33' (o.g.)	Report (CAFA)

Dushanbe Indoor hall, Dushanbe
Attendance: 100
Referee: Behruz Murtazoev (Tajikistan)
Suhrob Sattorov (Tajikistan)
Timur Ramazanov (Turkmenistan)
24 January 2020
15:00

Iran	15–0	Tajikistan
Ghomi 1', 12'; Torkaman 2', 2', 11', 11', 21'; Mohammadzade 4', 26'; Kurbonova 10' (o.g.); Arzani 22', 32'; Someye 33', 33'; Safarova 33' (o.g.)	Report (CAFA)

Dushanbe Indoor hall, Dushanbe
Attendance: 74
Referee: Nikita Afinogenov (Uzbekistan)
Askarbay Arzibekov (Uzbekistan)
Mohammad Latif Sharifi (Afghanistan)
24 January 2020
18:00

Uzbekistan	4–1	Turkmenistan
Kurbonova 6'; Ergasheva 11'; Shodieva 33', 33'	Report (CAFA)	Charyyeva 4'

Dushanbe Indoor hall, Dushanbe
Attendance: 100
Referee: Fahimeh Fatahi (Iran)
Fariba Kaabi Kermanshai (Iran)
Eldiiar Keldibekov (Kyrgyzstan)

25 January 2020
12:00

Iran	16–1	Afghanistan
Arzani 2', 5', 21'; Someye 3', 4', 6', 18', 25', 26', 39'; Torkaman 4', 6', 19'; Ghomi 7'; Afrogh 12', 19'	Report (CAFA)	Haidari 16'

Dushanbe Indoor hall, Dushanbe
Attendance: 79
Referee: Halida Eshniyazova (Turkmenistan)
Timur Ramazanov (Turkmenistan)
Suhrob Sattorov (Tajikistan)
25 January 2020
15:00

Tajikistan	2–3	Turkmenistan
Khudododova 6'; Davlyatova 21'	Report (CAFA)	Charyyeva 13'; Mammedova 22'; Haipova 30'

Dushanbe Indoor hall, Dushanbe
Attendance: 174
Referee: Talantbek Raimberdiev (Kyrgyzstan)
Eldiiar Keldibekov (Kyrgyzstan)
Askarbay Arzibekov (Uzbekistan)
25 January 2020
18:00

Uzbekistan	7–4	Kyrgyzstan
Shodieva 4', 29'; Kurbonova 17', 19', 28', 35'; Ergasheva 36'	Report (CAFA)	Toktobolotova 3'; Ibraimova 23'; Boronbekova 24'; Khikmatova 28' (o.g.)

Dushanbe Indoor hall, Dushanbe
Attendance: 60
Referee: Mohammad Tamim Hussaini (Afghanistan)
Mohammad Latif Sharifi (Afghanistan)
Fariba Kaabi Kermanshai (Iran)

26 January 2020
12:00

Turkmenistan	0–12	Iran
	Report (CAFA)	Ghomi 2'; Torkaman 4', 37'; Someye 5', 7', 18', 20', 23', 29'; Arzani 24', 38'; Yaghobi 32'

Dushanbe Indoor hall, Dushanbe
Attendance: 80
Referee: Suhrob Sattorov (Tajikistan)
Behruz Murtazoev (Tajikistan)
Mohammad Latif Sharifi (Afghanistan)
26 January 2020
15:00

Tajikistan	0–2	Kyrgyzstan
	Report (CAFA)	Yrysbek Kyzy 3'; Askarova 32'

Dushanbe Indoor hall, Dushanbe
Attendance: 220
Referee: Fariba Kaabi Kermanshai (Iran)
Fahimeh Fatahi (Iran)
Nikita Afinogenov (Uzbekistan)
26 January 2020
18:00

Afghanistan	0–3	Uzbekistan
	Report (CAFA)	Zaynitdinova 12'; Kurbonova 13'; Khojieva 39'

Dushanbe Indoor hall, Dushanbe
Attendance: 75
Referee: Eldiiar Keldibekov (Kyrgyzstan)
Talantbek Raimberdiev (Kyrgyzstan)
Halida Eshniyazova (Turkmenistan)

28 January 2020
12:00

Kyrgyzstan	1–2	Turkmenistan
Ibraimova 10'	Report (CAFA)	Haipova 24'; Mammedova 36'

Dushanbe Indoor hall, Dushanbe
Attendance: 82
Referee: Askarbay Arzibekov (Uzbekistan)
Nikita Afinogenov (Uzbekistan)
Fahimeh Fatahi (Iran)
28 January 2020
15:00

Afghanistan	3–3	Tajikistan
Sadat 16'; Noori 34'; Kohistani 38'	Report (CAFA)	Fayzulloeva 3', 9', 33'

Dushanbe Indoor hall, Dushanbe
Attendance: 210
Referee: Timur Ramazanov (Turkmenistan)
Halida Eshniyazova (Turkmenistan)
Fariba Kaabi Kermanshai (Iran)
28 January 2020
18:00

Uzbekistan	1–7	Iran
Ergasheva 21'	Report (CAFA)	Arzani 1', 34'; Someye 4', 7', 14'; Torkaman 16', 36'

Dushanbe Indoor hall, Dushanbe
Attendance: 143
Referee: Behruz Murtazoev (Tajikistan)
Talantbek Raimberdiev (Kyrgyzstan)
Mohammad Tamim Hussaini (Afghanistan)

29 January 2020
12:00

Turkmenistan	9–0	Afghanistan
	[ Report (CAFA)]

Dushanbe Indoor hall, Dushanbe
29 January 2020
15:00

Tajikistan	2–7	Uzbekistan
Fayzulloeva 29', 39'	Report (CAFA)	Allamurodova 8', 29'; Kurbonova 19'; Shodieva 20', 22'; Khikmatova 32'; Zaynitdinova 39'

Dushanbe Indoor hall, Dushanbe
Attendance: 154
29 January 2020
18:00

Iran	2–0	Kyrgyzstan
	[ Report (CAFA)]

Dushanbe Indoor hall, Dushanbe

== Goalscorers ==
There were 110 goals scored in 15 matches, for an average of 7.33 goals per match.

18 goals

- (Iran) Roghaye Someye

12 goals

- (Iran) Maral Torkaman

9 goals

- (Iran) Fahime Arzani

7 goals

- (Uzbekistan) Shakhnoza Kurbonova

6 goals

- (Uzbekistan) Laylo Shodieva

5 goals

- (Tajikistan) Marjona Fayzulloeva

4 goals

- (Iran) Nasrin Ghomi

3 goals

- (Uzbekistan) Nozimakhon Ergasheva

2 goals

- (Iran) Mahdie Mohammadzade
- (Iran) Ziba Afrogh
- (Kyrgyzstan) Aiturgan Askarova
- (Kyrgyzstan) Kenzhebubu Yrysbek Kyzy
- (Kyrgyzstan) Shakhnoza Ibraimova
- (Turkmenistan) Mariya Charyyeva
- (Turkmenistan) Lale Haipova
- (Turkmenistan) Jeren Mammedova
- (Uzbekistan) Shakhrizoda Zaynitdinova
- (Uzbekistan) Sugdiyona Allamurodova

1 goal

- (Afghanistan) Manizha Sadat
- (Afghanistan) Bi Bi Razia Noori
- (Afghanistan) Bahara Kohistani
- (Afghanistan) Fatima Haidari
- (Iran) Negar Yaghobi
- (Kyrgyzstan) Aizhan Boronbekova
- (Kyrgyzstan) Baktygul Toktobolotova
- (Tajikistan) Nekubakht Khudododova
- (Tajikistan) Madina Davlyatova
- (Uzbekistan) Madina Khikmatova
- (Uzbekistan) Ozoda Khojieva

1 own goal

- (Afghanistan) Bahara Kohistani (against Kyrgyzstan)
- (Tajikistan) Matluba Safarova (against Iran)
- (Tajikistan) Dzhonona Kurbonova (against Iran)
- (Uzbekistan) Madina Khikmatova (against Kyrgyzstan)

Source: CAFA

== Awards ==
The following awards were given at the conclusion of the tournament:

Top Goalscorer	Best player	Fair Play award	Special award
(Iran) Roghaye Someye (18 goals)	(Iran) Maral Torkaman	Turkmenistan	Tajikistan
