= Afghanistan women's national football team results (unofficial matches) =

Women's national football team

This page details the match results and statistics of the Afghanistan women's national football team.

== Key ==
Key to matches

- Att.=Match attendance
- (H)=Home ground
- (A)=Away ground
- (N)=Neutral ground

Key to record by opponent

- Pld=Games played
- W=Games won
- D=Games drawn
- L=Games lost
- GF=Goals for
- GA=Goals against

== Results ==
=== As Afghanistan national team ===
20 September 2015 Friendly	Afghanistan	0–14	(Japan) Angeviolet Hiroshima	Hiroshima, Japan
11:00 (UTC+9)		Report		Stadium: Hiroshima Big Arch

31 August 2016 Friendly	Afghanistan	1–3	(United States) Palo Alto 98G	Palo Alto, United States
11:00 (UTC+9)				Stadium: Maloney Field at Laird Q. Cagan Stadium

2 September 2016 2016 AFSO Tournament	Afghanistan	7–6	(Saudi Arabia) Ettifaq	Dublin, California, United States
18:00 (UTC+06:00)				Stadium: Dublin Sports Park

3 September 2016 2016 AFSO Tournament	Afghanistan	12–4	(Iran) Ariya	Dublin, California, United States
15:00 (UTC+03:00)				Stadium: Dublin Sports Park

4 September 2016 2016 AFSO Tournament	Afghanistan	0–18	(Mexico) Selinas	Dublin, California, United States
15:00 (UTC+03:00)				Stadium: Dublin Sports Park

4 September 2016 2016 AFSO Tournament	Afghanistan	1–15	(Mexico) Selinas	Dublin, California, United States
15:30 (UTC+03:30)				Stadium: Dublin Sports Park

=== As Melbourne Victory AWT ===
The Afghanistan women's national team were able to regroup in Australia by early 2022. They secured a partnership with A-League club Melbourne Victory enabling the team to continue operating and train at the Darebin International Sports Centre. It is unclear if they would be allowed by FIFA to play official international matches.

In March 2022, the national team was admitted into Football Victoria's state league. They were placed in State League 4 West, the seventh tier of Australian women's football and sixth in the Victorian structure.

The AWT played their first game of competitive football against ETA Buffalo at Delahey Reserve in April 2022, with the match ending in a 0-0 draw.

Jeff Hopkins, the manager of the Melbourne Victory Women's team, served as the inaugural manager of the AWT. In their inaugural season in the Victorian football league system, the AWT finished in third place, a result which saw them promoted to State League 3 East. Hopkins was succeeded as AWT manager by Jorge Leon for the 2023 State League 3 East season.

The AWT finished the 2023 State League 3 East season in second place, trailing first-placed Manningham United Blues on goal difference. The AWT achieved their second promotion in two years, after defeating Endeavour United 1-0 in the Women's State League 3 Play-Off Final.

==== 2022 ====
24 April FFV State League 4 West	ETA Buffalo (Victoria (state))	3–0	Melbourne Victory AWT	Delahey, Victoria, Australia
11:00 UTC+10		Report		Stadium: Delahey Reserve

1 May FFV State League 4 West	Melbourne Victory AWT	10–0	(Victoria (state)) Melton Phoenix	Docklands, Victoria, Australia
15:00 UTC+10	N. Mohammadi 18', 40', 49', 64'; M. Moslih 22'; M. Noori 43', 58', 60'; B. Samimi 76'; M. Sadat 85'	Report		Stadium: Ron Barassi Senior Reserve

8 May FFV State League 4 West	Gisborne (Victoria (state))	1–0	Melbourne Victory AWT	Gisborne, Victoria, Australia
11:00 UTC+10	B. Amor 77'	Report		Stadium: Dixon Field

15 May FFV State League 4 West	Melbourne Victory AWT	2–1	(Victoria (state)) Sydenham Park	Docklands, Victoria, Australia
15:00 UTC+10	unknown 30', 38'	Report	A. Chok 18'	Stadium: Ron Barassi Senior Reserve

29 May FFV State League 4 West	Melbourne Victory AWT	8–1	(Victoria (state)) Point Cook	Docklands, Victoria, Australia
15:00 UTC+10	unknown 4', 5', 6', 33', 45', 55', 82', 85'	Report	I. Seward 46'	Stadium: Ron Barassi Senior Reserve

5 June FFV State League 4 West	Barnstoneworth United (Victoria (state))	0–12	Melbourne Victory AWT	Williamstown, Victoria, Australia
15:00 UTC+10		Report	N. Ali 49', 68' unknown 10', 11', 13', 19', 40', 55', 65', 76', 83', 86'	Stadium: JT Gray Reserve

19 June FFV State League 4 West	Brimbank Stallions (Victoria (state))	0–8	Melbourne Victory AWT	North Sunshine, Victoria, Australia
15:00 UTC+10		Report	unknown 55', 56', 60', 61', 68', 82', 83', 90'	Stadium: Club Italia Sporting Club

26 June FFV State League 4 West	Melbourne Victory AWT	6–0	(Victoria (state)) ETA Buffalo	Docklands, Victoria, Australia
15:00 UTC+10	unknown 15', 18', 42', 53', 55', 85'	Report		Stadium: Ron Barassi Senior Reserve

3 July FFV State League 4 West	Melton Phoenix (Victoria (state))	0–12	Melbourne Victory AWT	Melton, Victoria, Australia
13:00 UTC+10		Report	A. Haidari 18' unknown 1', 41', 43', 44', 51', 56', 58', 64', 66', 81', 90'	Stadium: MacPherson Park

10 July FFV State League 4 West	Melbourne Victory AWT	2–0	(Victoria (state)) Gisborne	Docklands, Victoria, Australia
15:00 UTC+10	unknown 24', 57'	Report		Stadium: Ron Barassi Senior Reserve

17 July FFV State League 4 West	Sydenham Park (Victoria (state))	1–0	Melbourne Victory AWT	Taylors Lakes, Victoria, Australia
15:00 UTC+10	S. D'Anna 65'	Report		Stadium: Keilor Lodge Reserve

31 July FFV State League 4 West	Point Cook (Victoria (state))	0–3; Awarded	Melbourne Victory AWT	Point Cook, Victoria, Australia
13:30 UTC+10		Report		Stadium: Saltwater Reserve

14 August FFV State League 4 West	Melbourne Victory AWT	0–3; Awarded	(Victoria (state)) Barnstoneworth United	Docklands, Victoria, Australia
15:00 UTC+10		Report		Stadium: Ron Barassi Senior Reserve

28 August FFV State League 4 West	Melbourne Victory AWT	9–0	(Victoria (state)) Brimbank Stallions	Docklands, Victoria, Australia
15:00 UTC+10		Report		Stadium: Ron Barassi Senior Reserve

==== 2023 ====
5 March Nike F.C. Cup	Melbourne Victory AWT	5–0	(Victoria (state)) Hampton East Brighton	Bulleen, Victoria, Australia
18:00 UTC+10		Report		Stadium: Veneto Club

11 March Nike F.C. Cup	Melbourne Victory AWT	0–2	(Victoria (state)) Mill Park	Bulleen, Victoria, Australia
19:30 UTC+10		Report		Stadium: Veneto Club

30 April FFV State League 3 West	Alphington (Victoria (state))	1–7	Melbourne Victory AWT	Alphington, Victoria, Australia
13:15 UTC+10		Report		Stadium: Alphington Park Oval

7 May FFV State League 3 West	Melbourne Srbija (Victoria (state))	1–5	Melbourne Victory AWT	Burnley, Victoria, Australia
13:00 UTC+10		Report		Stadium: Kevin Bartlett Reserve – Bastow 1

14 May FFV State League 3 West	Melbourne Victory AWT	3–0	(Victoria (state)) Melbourne University	Docklands, Victoria, Australia
11:00 UTC+10		Report		Stadium: Ron Barassi Senior Reserve

21 May FFV State League 3 West	Malvern City (Victoria (state))	0–2	Melbourne Victory AWT	Kooyong, Victoria, Australia
12:00 UTC+10		Report		Stadium: Kooyong Park

28 May FFV State League 3 West	Collingwood City (Victoria (state))	1–6	Melbourne Victory AWT	Burnley, Victoria, Australia
13:30 UTC+10		Report		Stadium: Kevin Bartlett Reserve – Bastow 1

4 June FFV State League 3 West	Melbourne Victory AWT	12–0	(Victoria (state)) Yarra Jets	Docklands, Victoria, Australia
15:00 UTC+10		Report		Stadium: Ron Barassi Senior Reserve

9 June FFV State League 3 West	Manningham United Blues (Victoria (state))	1–0	Melbourne Victory AWT	Templestowe, Victoria, Australia
19:00 UTC+10	G. Kapsimallis 27' (pen.)			Stadium: Pettys Reserve – Pitch 1

18 June FFV State League 3 West	Melbourne Victory AWT	1–1	(Victoria (state)) Monash City Villarreal	Docklands, Victoria, Australia
11:00 UTC+10	B. Noori 19'	Report	G. Arraiz 39'	Stadium: Ron Barassi Senior Reserve

9 July FFV State League 3 West	Melbourne Victory AWT	9–0	(Victoria (state)) Alphington	Docklands, Victoria, Australia
15:00 UTC+10		Report		Stadium: Ron Barassi Senior Reserve

16 July FFV State League 3 West	Melbourne Victory AWT	3–1	(Victoria (state)) Melbourne Srbija	Docklands, Victoria, Australia
13:00 UTC+10		Report		Stadium: Ron Barassi Senior Reserve

23 July FFV State League 3 West	Melbourne University (Victoria (state))	0–4	Melbourne Victory AWT	Caulfield South, Victoria, Australia
11:00 UTC+10		Report		Stadium: Princes Park Oval #1

30 July FFV State League 3 West	Melbourne Victory AWT	0–0	(Victoria (state)) Malvern City	Docklands, Victoria, Australia
UTC+10		Report		Stadium: Ron Barassi Senior Reserve

6 August FFV State League 3 West	Melbourne Victory AWT	1–0	(Victoria (state)) Collingwood City	Docklands, Victoria, Australia
15:00 UTC+10		Report		Stadium: Ron Barassi Senior Reserve

13 August FFV State League 3 West	Yarra Jets (Victoria (state))	0–11	Melbourne Victory AWT	Fairfield, Victoria, Australia
13:15 UTC+10		Report		Stadium: Fairfield Park – Senior

27 August FFV State League 3 West	Melbourne Victory AWT	3–1	(Victoria (state)) Manningham United Blues	Docklands, Victoria, Australia
11:00 UTC+10		Report		Stadium: Ron Barassi Senior Reserve

3 September FFV State League 3 West	Monash City Villarreal (Victoria (state))	0–1	Melbourne Victory AWT	Brighton, Victoria, Australia
15:00 UTC+10		Report		Stadium: Mitchell Oval
