= Pasandideh =

Pasandideh (Persian: پسندیده) is a surname. Notable people with the surname include:

- Fatemeh Pasandideh (born 2004), Iranian footballer
- Morteza Pasandideh (1893–1996), brother of Ruhollah Khomeini
