= Libya women's national football team =

Women's national association football team representing Libya

Libya
- Association: Libyan Football Federation
- Confederation: CAF (Africa)
- Sub-confederation: UNAF (North Africa)
- Head coach: Naji Ajbara
- Captain: Hadhom Al-Abed
- FIFA code: LBY
First colours	Second colours

FIFA ranking
- Current: 188 ▼1 (16 June 2026)
- Highest: 187 (December 2025 – April 2026)
- Lowest: 187 (December 2025 – April 2026)

First international
- Libya 0–8 Egypt (Sousse, Tunisia; 6 March 2016)

Biggest defeat
- Tunisia 16–0 Libya (Berrechid, Morocco; 26 October 2025); Chad 16–0 Libya (Berrechid, Morocco; 29 October 2025)

The Libya women's national football team is the national football team of Libya. It does not have FIFA recognition. It is not ranked by FIFA. There are development plans in the country to improve the state of women's football.

== History ==
=== Background and development ===
Early development of the women's game at the time colonial powers brought football to the continent was limited as colonial powers in the region tended to take make concepts of patriarchy and women's participation in sport with them to local cultures that had similar concepts already embedded in them. The lack of later development of the national team on a wider international level symptomatic of all African teams is a result of several factors, including limited access to education, poverty amongst women in the wider society, and fundamental inequality present in the society that occasionally allows for female specific human rights abuses. When quality female football players are developed, they tend to leave for greater opportunities abroad. Continent wide, funding is also an issue, with most development money coming from FIFA, not the national football association. Future success for women's football in Africa is dependent on improved facilities and access by women to these facilities. Attempting to commercialise the game and make it commercially viable is not the solution, as demonstrated by the current existence of many youth and women's football camps held throughout the continent.

The women's game is severely underdeveloped in Libya. A project was in development in 2004 to try to improve the state of the game for women, mirroring a similar project done in Afghanistan. In 2006, there were 0 registered female players in the country. That year, a committee was under development to better register and track female footballers. In 2006, there were no women's teams in the country. Football is played by girls aged 9 to 18 in school. There were 0 registered female futsal players in 2006 though there are some unregistered female futsal players in the country. Rights to broadcast the 2011 Women's World Cup in the country were bought by Al Jazeera and Eurosport.

The national federation was created in 1962 and joined FIFA in 1964. Their kit includes green shirts, white shorts and green socks. In 2006, there were three staff members dedicated to working on women's football in the country.

=== Beginnings ===
On 6 March 2016, the Libya women's national team played its first international match against Egypt during the Africa Cup of Nations qualification, which ended in an 8–0 defeat. In 2021, the Libyan Football Association, headed by Abdul Hakim Al-Shalmani, announced the launch of the first women's league in the country's history, with the actual start would be on the first of September later that year.

== Results and fixtures ==
The following is a list of match results in the last 12 months, as well as any future matches that have been scheduled.

Legend

Win Draw Lose Fixture

=== 2025 ===
26 October 2025 FIFA Unites Women's Series	Tunisia	16–0	Libya	Berrechid, Morocco
20:00 UTC+1	Mejri 5', 53'; Zerelli 13', 43'; Ammar 22', 39', 49'; Abbassi 24', 47'; Ben Kaabia 63', 73', 75', 88'; Nouhaili 66'; Lamti 78'; Khemili 85'	Report		Stadium: Berrechid Municipal Stadium; Referee: Haneen Murad (Jordan)

29 October 2025 FIFA Unites Women's Series	Chad	16–0	Libya	Berrechid, Morocco
20:00 UTC+1	Abdoulaye 6', 32', 59'; Dallou 8', 50', 62'; Larkingam 10', 14', 45+3', 55'; Azinda 45+1'; Tchinsou 68'; Akouya 71'; Dionkane 74'; Menda 81'; Lemta 82'	Report		Stadium: Berrechid Municipal Stadium; Referee: Khuloud Khudoum (UAE)

1 November 2025 FIFA Unites Women's Series	Libya	0–7	(Afghanistan) Afghan Women United	Berrechid, Morocco
17:00 UTC+1			Ali 4', 12'; Amini 18' (pen.); N. Mohammadi 54'; Noori 64'; S. Mohammadi 70'; Haidari 83'	Stadium: Berrechid Municipal Stadium

== Players ==
=== Current squad ===
The following players were called up for the FIFA Unites Women's Series 2025 matches against Afghan Women United, Chad and Tunisia on 26, 29 October and 1 November 2025.

No.	Pos.	Player	Date of birth (age)	Club
1	GK	Naama Barka	28 February 1993 (age 33)	
2		Azeezah Al-Shoushan		
3		Shahid Omrani		
4		Muneerah Al-Ajeeli	4 June 1993 (age 33)	
5		Sundus Al-Ushaylim		
6		Hadhom Al-Abed (Captain)		
7		Maryam El Maemi		
8		Nuwara Al-Firjani		
9		Saeida Al-Birnawi		
10		Bushra Al-Roubaa		
11		Asyaa Al-Hamadi		
12	GK	Salma Al-Zawi		
13		Noura Al-Tajouri		
14		Sarah Al-Alam		
15		Sahar Buhmira		
17		Suhad El Degheili		
18		Fadwa El Bahi		
19		Randa Jalgham		
20		Shahid Al-Boulati		
21		Fatima El Ftimi		
22	GK	Saja El Masri		
23		Feda El Ghobbar		

== Competitive record ==
Champions Runners-up Third place Fourth place

=== FIFA Women's World Cup ===
FIFA Women's World Cup record
Year	Result	Pld	W	D*	L	GS	GA	GD
(China) 1991	did not exist							
(Sweden) 1995	did not exist							
(United States) 1999	did not exist							
(United States) 2003	did not exist							
(China) 2007	did not exist							
(Germany) 2011	did not exist							
(Canada) 2015	did not exist							
(France) 2019	did not qualify							
(Australia) (New Zealand) 2023	did not enter							
(Brazil) 2027	did not enter							
(Costa Rica) (Jamaica) (Mexico) (United States) 2031	to be determined							
(United Kingdom) 2035	to be determined							
Total	0/12	0	0	0	0	0	0	0

*Draws include knockout matches decided on penalty kicks.

=== Olympic Games ===
Summer Olympics record
Year	Result	Pld	W	D*	L	GS	GA	GD
(United States) 1996	did not exist							
(Australia) 2000	did not exist							
(Greece) 2004	did not exist							
(China) 2008	did not exist							
(United Kingdom) 2012	did not exist							
(Brazil) 2016	withdrew							
(Japan) 2020	did not enter							
(France) 2024	did not enter							
Total	0/8	0	0	0	0	0	0	0

*Draws include knockout matches decided on penalty kicks.

=== Africa Women Cup of Nations ===
Africa Women Cup of Nations
Year	Round	GP	W	D*	L	GS	GA	GD
1991 to (Namibia) 2014	did not exit							
(Cameroon) 2016	did not qualify							
(Ghana) 2018	did not qualify							
(Republic of the Congo) 2020	Cancelled due to COVID-19 pandemic in Africa							
(Morocco) 2022	did not enter							
(Morocco) 2024	withdrew							
Total	0/7	0	0	0	0	0	0	0

(The former format was amended as it did not comply with MOS:FLAG as discussed here)

*Draws include knockout matches decided on penalty kicks.

=== African Games ===
African Games record
Year	Result	Matches	Wins	Draws	Losses	GF	GA	GD
(Nigeria) 2003	did not exist							
(Algeria) 2007	did not exist							
(Mozambique) 2011	did not exist							
(Republic of the Congo) 2015	did not exist							
(Morocco) 2019	See Libya women's national under-20 football team							
(Ghana) 2023	See Libya women's national under-20 football team							
(Egypt) 2027	to be determined							
Total	0/5	0	0	0	0	0	0	

=== Regional ===
==== UNAF Women's Tournament ====
UNAF Women's Tournament record
Appearances: 2
Year	Round	Position	Pld	W	D	L	GF	GA	GD
(Tunisia) 2009	withdrew								
(Tunisia) 2020	withdrew								
Total		0/2	0	0	0	0	0	0	0

==== Arab Women's Championship ====
Arab Women's Championship record
Appearances: 1
Year	Round	Position	Pld	W	D	L	GF	GA	GD
(Egypt) 2006	did not enter								
(Egypt) 2021	did not enter								
Total		0/2	0	0	0	0	0	0	0

== All−time record against FIFA-recognized nations ==
The list below presents the all-time international record of the Libyan women's national football team against other nations.

As of 1 November 2025, after the match against Afghanistan.
Key

Positive balance (more wins than losses)
Neutral balance (as many wins as losses)
Negative balance (more losses than wins)

The following table shows Libya’s all-time official international record per opponent:

Opponent	Pld	W	D	L	GF	GA	GD	W%	Confederation
Afghanistan	1	0	0	1	0	7	−7	0	AFC
Chad	1	0	0	1	0	16	−16	0	CAF
Egypt	2	0	0	2	0	12	−12	0	CAF
Ethiopia	2	0	0	2	0	15	−15	0	CAF
Tunisia	1	0	0	1	0	16	−16	0	CAF
Total	7	0	0	7	0	66	−66	0	—

== See also ==
- Sport in Libya
  - Football in Libya
    - Women's football in Libya
- Libya women's national under-20 football team
- Libya women's national under-17 football team
