= Fatima Yousufi =

Afghan footballer (born 2002)

Personal information
- Date of birth: January 14, 2002 (age 24)
- Place of birth: Afghanistan
- Height: 1.78 m (5 ft 10 in)
- Position: Goalkeeper

Team information
- Current team: Melbourne Victory FC AWT

Senior career*
Years	Team	Apps	(Gls)
2022–	Melbourne Victory FC AWT		

International career
- Afghanistan
- * Club domestic league appearances and goals

Fatima Yousufi (born 14 January 2002) is an Afghan women's footballer who plays as a goalkeeper for Melbourne Victory FC AWT and the Afghanistan women's national football team.

== Career ==
Yousufi started playing football after being inspired by watching Cristiano Ronaldo and Lionel Messi on television. Whilst playing with friends, an Afghanistan Football Federation scout spotted her and invited her to try out for the Afghanistan women's under-17 football team. Whilst training, she had to hide her football training from her father and often had to play wearing a hijab which covered most of her face.

In 2022, Yousufi signed for Australian seventh tier side Melbourne Victory FC AWT. Despite the team predominantly consisting of the former Afghanistan women's national team, FIFA refused to recognise them as the national team in 2023. Yousufi led a campaign for official recognition so they could play international football again. In 2026, FIFA changed their position and allowed the Afghan Women United team, that Yousufi was a part of, to be officially recognised as the Afghanistan women's national team despite not being affiliated to the Afghanistan Football Federation.

== Personal life ==
Yousufi fled to Australia following the Fall of Kabul to the Taliban in 2021. She had to bury her football kits and trophies in the garden to hide them after her teammates and coaches had received messages containing threats from the Taliban. She, along with 37 other Afghani women players were granted emergency Australian visas. Her parents and younger sister were able to join her in Australia in November 2025.
