= CAFA U-20 Women's Championship =

- Founded: 2021
- Region: Central Asia (CAFA)
- Number of teams: 5
- Current champions: Uzbekistan (1 title)
- Most successful team(s): Uzbekistan (1 title)
- 2021

The CAFA U-20 Women's Championship is a biennial football championship for women's footballers under the age of 20 and is organized by the Central Asian Football Association (CAFA). The championship was held for the first time in June 2021 in Tajikistan.

== Results ==
Year	Host	Final			Third Place Match
Year	Host	Winner	Score	Runner-up	Third-place	Score	Fourth place
2021; Details	Tajikistan	Uzbekistan	round-robin	Iran	Kyrgyzstan	round-robin	Afghanistan
