= Women's football in Afghanistan =

- Country: Afghanistan
- Governing body: Afghanistan Football Federation
- National team: Women's national team (unrecognized since 2021)

Football in Afghanistan has traditionally been played by men as women were prevented from participating in sports.

During the Islamic Republic era, a women's team was set up to promote the game. Even so, many women experienced prejudice for playing the sport during this period.

In 2019, FIFA imposed a life ban on the Afghanistan Football Federation president Keramuudin Karim from all football-related activity after an investigation found him guilty of “having abused his position and sexually abused various female players”. This underlined the grave challenges that Afghan women athletes faced even before the Taliban takeover.

Following the Taliban takeover of Afghanistan in 2021, women have been banned from participating in any sport, including football.

== See also ==
- Football in Afghanistan
