= Wynnum Wolves FC =

Wynnum Wolves Football Club
- Full name: Wynnum Wolves Football Club
- Founded: 1921
- Ground: Carmichael Park
- Capacity: 4,000
- President: Rabieh Krayem
- Head Coach: Mark Wills
- League: NPL Queensland
- 2025: 8th of 12
- Website: https://wynnumwolvesfc.com.au/
Home colours	Away colours

Wynnum Wolves Football Club, Wolves FC, or WDSC Wolves FC, also known as the Brisbane Wolves FC, is a semi-professional football club with home grounds in Boundary Street, Tingalpa, Brisbane, Queensland, Australia. Founded in 1921, the club has a long tradition and currently competes in the Football Queensland Premier League and promoted in National Premier Leagues Queensland for 2024 seasons.

== Club history ==
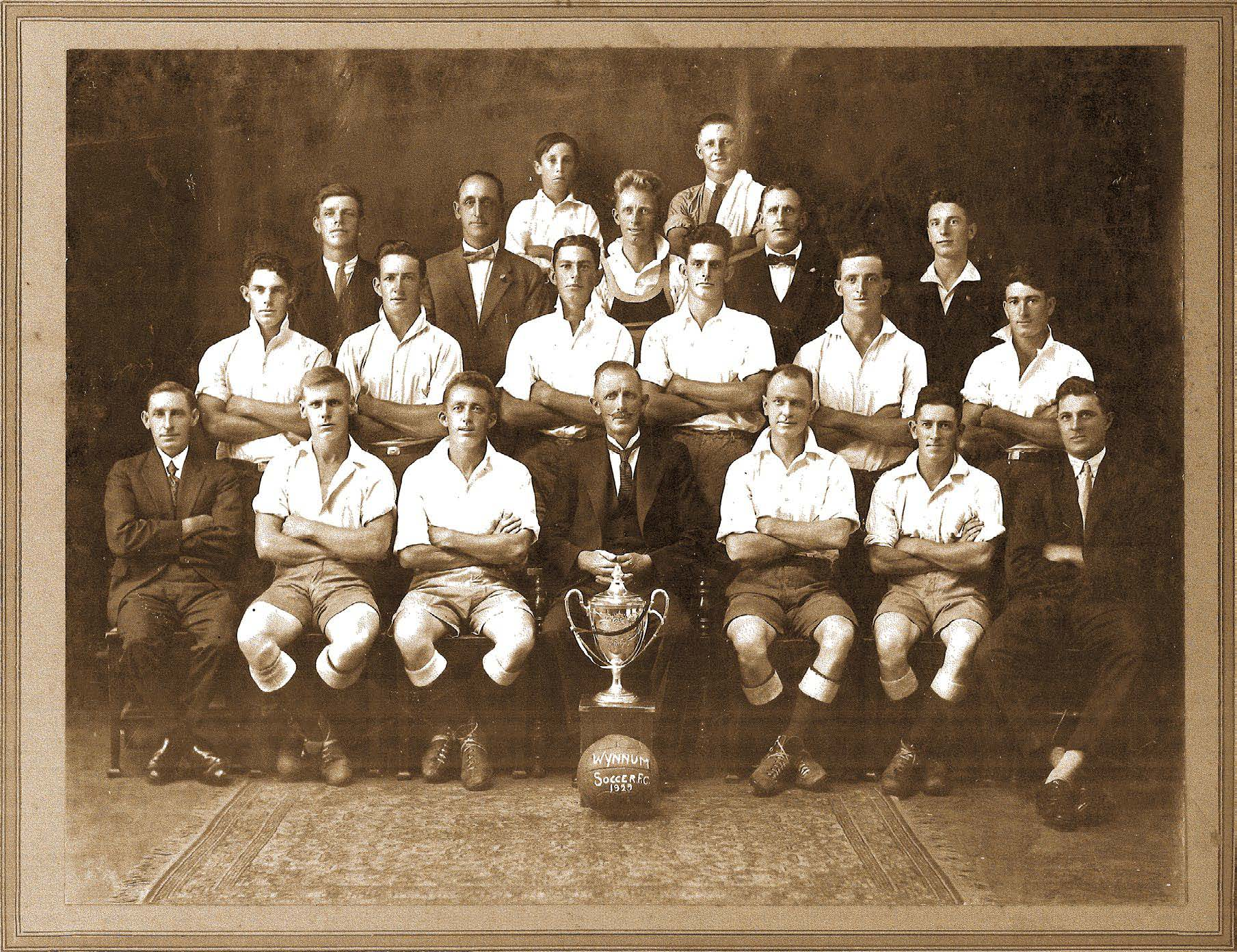
Wynnum Soccer Football Club 1929

=== 1921 to 1950 ===
Wolves FC began in Wynnum in 1921. In very early times matches were played at the Gabba, Wembley Oval at Burke Street Coorparoo and also at Memorial Park, Wynnum.

In 1949 Wynnum played in the QSFA second division.

=== 1960s to 2000 ===
In 1966, the club purchased a house and land in Bognor Street, (on the Wynnum Road side of the Pony Club) Wynnum. They developed a field and called it Maramba Stadium. From this time, the seniors played out of Maramba Stadium, while the juniors remained at Memorial Park, next to the Wynnum High School.

In the 1970s Wynnum played in the Queensland State League.

Up until the 1980s the Wynnum District Soccer Club (WDSC) effectively consisted of two clubs, a senior and a junior club. Seniors played at Maramba Stadium, while the juniors were at Memorial Park. Earlier committees accepted that a split club situation was not healthy, but no alternative was available due to a lack of funds to purchase more land adjacent to Maramba. In 1981 the Wynnum-Manly District Cricket Club (WMDCC) established itself at Boundary Street, Tingalpa with two cricket ovals with turf blocks, a canteen and toilet facilities. With no winter tenant, the cricket club struggled to maintain itself from year to year. The facilities were basic and costs were increasing. In an attempt to secure their survival, the two clubs began talks, requiring the relocation of WDSC to Boundary Street, Tingalpa.

In 1985 Wynnum played in the Queensland Soccer Federation Intermediate League, winning the Premiership, and thereby gaining promotion to Premier League in 1986. In 1986, Wynnum fared poorly and was then relegated back to Division 2 for the 1987 season. In 1987, Wynnum finished second and won the Grand Final defeating Brisbane Croatia. In 1988 Wynnum finished sixth in division 2.

At the end of the 1993 soccer season and with assistance from a grant from the federal government through Brisbane City Council and the proceeds from the sale of Maramba Stadium, and the thousands of volunteer hours, the move was completed in time for the 1994 soccer season. What is now known as "Eddie Wilkins" field and the No. 3 cricket oval were developed at this time. Also included in the works was the extension to the original Besser brick clubhouse to include the upstairs verandah and the complementary addition downstairs.

=== 2000s ===
August 2005 saw the awarding of a grant to the club to resurface the No.1 pitch, install below ground irrigation in field one, build new dressing rooms and carry out further work on field four as well as lighting upgrades and other minor works.

The works commenced on 5 December 2005. Since the facility improvements, Wolves have proved to be extremely and increasingly successful due to the determination of its leadership, team members, and club supporters.

==== 2016 season ====
The 2016 Season began with Mark Youngjohns as Head Coach, tasked to restore the club back into the BPL. After a promising start to the season, the First grade side lost seven fixtures in succession and were in the relegation zone, second last in the competition. Mark Dykman replaced Mark Youngjohns as Head Coach in May 2016 and lifted the team from 11th position to finish 7th at the conclusion of the regular season winning 7 of the remaining 11 games.

The turning point in the season was the dramatic fixture in Round 16 where Wolves FC met Bayside United at Carmichael Park. Bayside came into the fixture in second place on the ladder looking to consolidate their aspirations for promotion, whilst Wolves FC were in the relegation zone in 11th position. In the 13th minute of the match, Wolves FC forward Antonio Murray was forced to be replaced after a challenge left him with a fractured leg. Wolves FC forward Michael Bell scored in the 25th minute to give the Wolves the lead 1–0. However, in the 45th minute, another challenge saw Michael Bell leave the field in an ambulance with a broken leg. Following the half time resumption, two Wolves players were given red cards by the referee, leaving the Wolves with only nine men with twenty minutes still to play. Stoic defence followed, with it looking like the Wolves would hold on to seal to victory. With minutes remaining, Bayside were awarded a penalty which gave them an opportunity to snatch a draw. However Wolves keeper Douglas Blaikie blocked the penalty with a diving save to his right, which was then cleared by the desperate Wolves FC defenders. Wolves FC won the match 1–0.

==== 2018 season ====
On 29 May 2017, Football Queensland announced that Wolves FC had been accepted into the Football Queensland Premier League (FQPL). The winner of this league each year gains promotion into the NPL.

In its first season in the FQPL, Wolves finished the season in 9th place on 28 points with a goal difference of -15. The leading goal scorer was Alejandro Pastor Martinez with 19 goals.

==== 2019 season ====
Kerwin Jean Pierre was appointed as first grade coach to coach Wolves FC's second season in the Football Queensland Premier League replacing Mark Dykman.

=== 2020s ===
==== 2025 season ====
In 2025 the women's team competed in the FQPL 3 League, finishing in the top four and contesting finals for the first time last.

==== 2026 season ====
As of 2026, the women's team is playing in FQPL 3, coached by Peter Merefield, and are aiming for promotion to FQPL 2.

As of September 2026, two Iranian women footballers who had defected from the country after the 2026 AFC Women's Asian Cup in March 2026, Fatemeh Pasandideh ("Pasand") and Atefeh Ramezanizadeh ("Ati"), are training with the Wolves team.

== About the club ==
Wolves FC has men's, women's, and youth teams for girls and boys from the ages of 6 and up. Located at Carmichael Park, Wolves FC provides the opportunity for all ages to enjoy playing competitive football. Wolves FC has a long history in the Brisbane Competition dating back to 1921 when Wynnum entered in the highest division.

The WDSC (Wynnum District Soccer Club) operates in conjunction with the Moreton Bay Sports Club, which facilitates numerous sporting and recreational events for the community. Clubs associated with the Moreton Bay Sports Club are the Wynnum Manly District Cricket Club, Wynnum District Darts Club, and other various organisations that initiate community activities.

As of September 2026 Rabieh Krayem is president of the club.

== Club and player honours ==
=== Football Queensland ===
- Football Queensland Premier League (second tier)
  - Championship Grand final 2023
- Tedman Cup Winners 1929 and 1938
- Queensland Cup (Ampol) Cup Champions 1997
- Queensland Soccer Federation XXXX Premier League Premiers 2001
- Queensland Soccer Federation XXXX Premier League Grand Finalists 2001
- Brisbane Premier League Premiers 2011, 2014
- Brisbane Premier League Champions 2009, 2010, 2012
- Brisbane Premier League Gold Medal Winner – Tony McKinless 1995
- Brisbane Premier League Gold Medal Winner – Kado Aoci 2013
- Brisbane Premier League Golden Boot Winner – Steffen Vroom 2011
- Brisbane Premier League Golden Boot Winner – Kado Aoci 2013
- Brisbane Premier League Golden Boot Winner – Kado Aoci 2014
- Brisbane Premier League Golden Boot Winner – Alistair Davis 2015

== First Grade Squad ==
Correct as of Jan 2019

Note: Flags indicate national team as defined under FIFA eligibility rules; some limited exceptions apply. Players may hold more than one non-FIFA nationality.

No.	Pos.	Nation	Player
3	DF	AUS	Bobby Irving (Captain)
9	FW	ESP	Alejandro Pastor Martinez
10	FW	AUS	Ayden Cinello
?	FW	AUS	Jacob Krayem
