= Atefeh Ramezanizadeh =

Iranian footballer

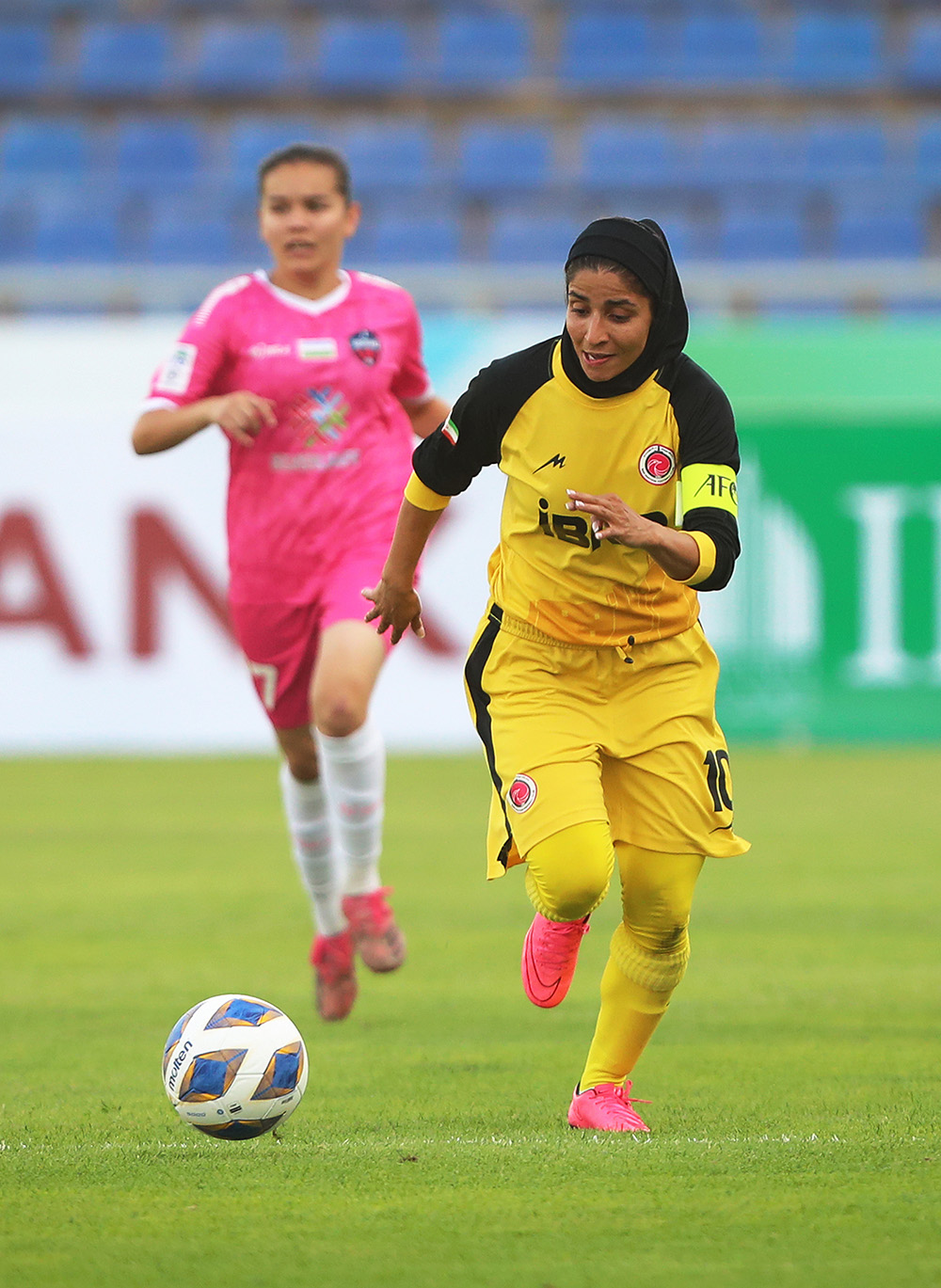
- Ramezanizadeh (right) in 2022

Personal information
- Date of birth: 21 April 1992 (age 34)
- Place of birth: Baft, Iran
- Position: Defender

Senior career*
Years	Team	Apps	(Gls)
2010–2026	Bam Khatoon		

International career
2016–	Iran		
- * Club domestic league appearances and goals

Atefeh Ramezanizadeh (Persian: عاطفه رمضانی‌زاده; born 21 April 1992) is an Iranian-Australian professional footballer who plays as a defender and midfielder. As of September 2026 she is training with Wynnum Wolves FC in Brisbane.

== Early life ==
Atefeh Ramezanizadeh was born in Baft, Iran, on 21 April 1992.

== Career ==
Ramezanizadeh became a professional footballer, playing as a defender and midfielder.

In Iran, she played for the Kowsar Women Football League club Bam Khatoon and, from 2016, for the Iran national team.

In April 2017, she played four games in the AFC Women's Asian Cup Qualification round.

She played for the national team at least 7 times in 2025–2026, including in the 2026 AFC Women's Champions League. She also played for Bam Khatoon against other international club teams three times in 2025.

== Defection and life in Australia ==
In March 2026, Ramezanizadeh, along with several teammates from the Iranian women's national football team, left the team's training camp in Australia during the 2026 AFC Women's Champions League and sought asylum. This was due to fears of retaliation from Iranian authorities, after the team had refrained from singing the Iranian national anthem. Although most of the original group ended up changing their minds and returned to Iran, Fatemeh Pasandideh and Ramezanizadeh chose to remain in Australia, and on 16 March started training with Brisbane Roar. Brisbane Roar's social media post about the women being welcomed to train with them, which included photos, went viral. On 25 March, Ramezanizadeh posted a message to her teammates back in Iran, saying "You were not just teammates to me, you were my family. Thank you for all the laughter and hardships we spent together. You will always be in my heart".

On 5 August 2026 Ramezanisadeh, along with teammate Pasandideh, were sworn in as Australian citizens by Home Affairs Minister Tony Burke.

As of September 2026 Pasandideh and Ramezanisadeh are both training with Wynnum Wolves FC, based at Carmichael Park in Brisbane, and aspire to play professional football in Australia.

== Personal life ==
Ramezanisadeh goes by the name of "Ati".

On 6 September 2026 Ramezanisadeh, along with Pasandideh, told their stories on Nine Network's 60 Minutes. Pasandideh said "We just wanted to stand with our people. I was scared at times, but I just tried to do what was right, and to say that no one should be killed just for protesting".
