= Melbourne Victory FC AWT =

- Full name: Melbourne Victory Football Club Afghan Women's Team
- Short name: AWT
- Founded: March 2022; 4 years ago
- Ground: The Home of the Matildas
- Manager: Jorge Leon
- League: FFV State League 2 South-East
- Last season 2024: FFV State League 2 South-East, 4th of 10
Home colours	Away colours

Melbourne Victory FC AWT is an Afghan Australian women's soccer team affiliated with Melbourne Victory FC and Football Federation Victoria. Founded in March 2022, the club plays in the FFV State League 3 East, which is the sixth tier of football in the country.

== History ==
In August 2021, following the takeover of Afghanistan by the Taliban, former national team captain Khalida Popal who was based in Denmark, urged players to delete their social media accounts, erase public identities and burn their kits for safety's sake as they are again under Taliban rule. On 25 August, the Australian government announced they had evacuated 75 Afghan women athletes including football players. FIFPro and Popal worked with authorities in six countries, including Australia, the US, and the UK, to get athletes and their families airlifted out of Afghanistan. FIFPro general secretary Jonas Baer-Hoffmann described the evacuations as "an incredibly complex process".

=== Establishment ===
The Afghanistan women's national team were able to regroup in Australia by early 2022. They secured a partnership with A-League club Melbourne Victory enabling the team to continue operating and train at the Darebin International Sports Centre. It is unclear if they would be allowed by FIFA to play official international matches.

In March 2022, the national team was admitted into Football Victoria's state league. They were placed in State League 4 West, the seventh tier of Australian women's football and sixth in the Victorian structure.

The AWT played their first game of competitive football against ETA Buffalo at Delahey Reserve in April 2022, with the match ending in a 0–0 draw.

Jeff Hopkins, the manager of the Melbourne Victory Women's team, served as the inaugural manager of the AWT. In their inaugural season in the Victorian football league system, the AWT finished in third place, a result which saw them promoted to State League 3 East. Hopkins was succeeded as AWT manager by Jorge Leon for the 2023 State League 3 East season.

The AWT finished the 2023 State League 3 East season in second place, trailing first-placed Manningham United Blues on goal difference. The AWT achieved their second promotion in two years, after defeating Endeavour United 1–0 in the Women's State League 3 Play-Off Final.

== Players ==
=== Current squad ===
As of March 2022

No.	Pos.	Nation	Player
2	DF	AFG	Adeba Ganji
7	FW	AFG	Nilab Mohammadi
9	DF	AFG	Saleha Rezaei
10		AFG	Manizha Sadat
12	DF	AFG	Bahara Samimi
13	GK	AFG	Fatima Yousufi (captain)
16	DF	AFG	Frishta Shaikhmiri
17	MF	AFG	Shamsia Amiri

No.	Pos.	Nation	Player
18	GK	AFG	Montaha Moslih
20	FW	AFG	Manozh Noori
40	DF	AFG	Fatema Mursal Sadat
42		AFG	Oranos Haidary
44	DF	AFG	Arezo Mohammadi
50	MF	AFG	Farida Mohammadi
—		AFG	Roona Yadegar
