= Laylo Shodieva =

Uzbekistani footballer

Personal information
- Full name: Laylo Ilhom qizi Shodieva
- Date of birth: 26 March 2000 (age 26)
- Place of birth: Chirakchi, Uzbekistan
- Position: Defender

Team information
- Current team: Sevinch

Senior career*
Years	Team	Apps	(Gls)
- Sevinch

International career^{‡}
	Uzbekistan U16	1+	(0)
2018–2019	Uzbekistan U19	7	(5)
2018–	Uzbekistan	2+	(0)
- * Club domestic league appearances and goals ‡ National team caps and goals as of 8 September 2019

Laylo Shodieva (Uzbek: Laylo Shodiyeva; born 26 March 2000) is an Uzbekistani footballer who plays as a defender for Women's Championship club Sevinch and the Uzbekistan women's national team.

== International career ==
Shodieva capped for Uzbekistan at senior level during the 2018 CAFA Women's Championship and the 2019 Hope Cup.

== See also ==
- List of Uzbekistan women's international footballers
