= Khalida Popal =

Afghan footballer and director

Khalida Popal (pashto: خالده پوپل, born in Kabul, Afghanistan in 1987) is an Afghan football player. Popal is the founder and director of Girl Power Organization, the Program and Event Director of the Afghanistan women's national football team, Ambassador to Street Child World Cup, and the Event Manager & Mentor/ Refugee Consultant in COLUM. She is also the former leader of the Afghanistan women's Football Committee, former Finance Officer of the Afghanistan Football Federation, former captain of the Afghan women's national football team, and former football coach of the under-17 and under-15 women's football teams in Afghanistan.

== Early life and education ==
Popal was born in 1987 in Kabul, Afghanistan, in a Popalzai Pashtun family. She attended the Business Academy of Denmark, where she received a degree in international marketing management. Popal was taught how to play football by her mother, who was also a physical education teacher. Her mother focused on the power of sport for women and how it can open up new opportunities for young girls.

As a teenage woman playing soccer, Popal was highly vulnerable to discrimination and oppression as the war in Afghanistan continued and the Taliban began to take over areas around Kabul. Kabul, a major city in Afghanistan, was marred by conflict where women had little to no human rights. During this time, the Taliban banned women from playing sports and attending sporting events. In order to avoid being seen playing football by men, Popal and her friends played after school in an isolated yard. Although forbidden, more and more girls joined Popal in playing football after school. Empowered by the growth in the number of young girls playing, Popal eventually moved the playing area into public fields. Even though the Taliban's reign over Afghanistan ended in 2001, Popal still faced the threat and vision of her local community. Many in her community disapproved of young girls playing football and began throwing stones and declaring them "prostitutes" for playing football.

== Career ==
In 2007, with the approval and support of the Afghan Football Association, Popal formed the Afghan women's football league with her friends. For their safety, the team practised inside a NATO base in Kabul and the team played their first game in Pakistan in 2008. The team's first-ever match was against the International Security Assistance Forces XI. They won 5–0. In December 2010, the team played their first international match, losing 13–0 against Nepal at the South Asian Women's Football Championship in Bangladesh. As the team grew and eventually began to have success in football, Popal became a higher-profile target for extremist and anti-women groups.

== Asylum ==
In 2011, Popal received numerous death threats and decided to leave Afghanistan. She left Kabul and made her way to India. She was constantly on the move in India as she had no visa. From India she made her way to Norway seeking further asylum, due to her lacking a visa for India. Popal eventually landed in Denmark, where she lived in a refugee camp for nearly a year before she was granted residency. Popal sought to play for a local team, but she suffered a serious knee injury that prevented her from playing football again.

Soon after sustaining the injury to her knee, Popal became highly depressed. She turned down opportunities to start swimming and cycling. In an interview in 2017, Popal stated “Suddenly I was losing everything. I’d lost my country, my identity, I was in an asylum centre, I’d lost my family, I couldn’t play. I felt like a doll hanging in the air. I could not fly in the sky and I could not come to the ground." Popal sought help from psychiatrists and began taking antidepressants.

== Girl Power and Street Child World Cup ==
After sustaining a career-ending injury, Popal turned her attention to working with women in refugee camps. She focused on teaching them the power of sports as a therapeutic and empowering practice. She formed the organization titled Girl Power, which focuses heavily on giving women in minority communities the chance to meet others like them and develop better self-esteem and confidence through sport. The organization's goal is to use sport as a way to motivate and empower minority groups in Europe. Such groups include immigrants, refugee women, and members of the LGBT community. The organization strives to create awareness and understanding of different cultures in order to promote religious and racial tolerance in European societies. Girl power finds volunteer instructors to work in all sports with refugees and strives to connect them and with local Danish citizens.

Popal is also an ambassador to Street Child World Cup. Street Child World Cup is an organization that puts together sporting events for children that live in the streets to participate in. Before major world sporting events, including the 2018 World Cup, Street Child World Cup brings together children living in poverty and on the streets to play in organized games and tournaments. These tournaments offer areas of safety and empowerment for the children. Children are able to interact with others, the greater community, and through visual art-work and organized community events, share their stories and experiences with the world.

== Work with Hummel ==
In Denmark, Popal also found work with Hummel, a Danish athletic apparel company that designed uniforms for her team that covered the women head to toe in keeping with cultural norms. She continues to work with Hummel and other international NGOs to fight for women's rights in sports around the world. Hummel recently made a new uniform for the Afghan Women's National Football team, one that covers the head in a way that does not require women to wear a hijab during the games. The model Hummel created seeks to provide a lightweight sports form of a hijab so players do not overheat while wearing one. The goal of working with Hummel is to promote a change of mindset surrounding sport and women, that women playing sports does not go against any certain culture or religion.

== President Trump's travel ban impact ==
Given her time spent in refugee camps, Popal is still able to spot talent in these camps that could help the Afghan Women's National Football Team, with whom she still works with. In addition, she has worked with and recruited American coaches who have played at the highest of levels, even training in the United States. However, this has come to an end recently as United States President Donald Trump employed a ban on Afghan immigrants into the United States. Popal stated: "We cannot continue in America because the president is against Muslims and refugees. If those people inside my country, those haters, couldn’t stop me, Donald Trump or [even] a hundred Trumps will never stop me." Given the circumstances, she has turned her attention to working with more coaches and women in Asia.

== Writing ==
In 2024 Popal published the autobiographical work My Beautiful Sisters, written with Suzanne Wrack of The Guardian. The book covers Popal's family being forced to move to Pakistan in 1996, returning to Afghanistan after the fall of the Taliban in 2001, setting up a women's football team in Kabul, exposing sexual abuse experienced by some of the players, and later moving to Denmark and enabling other players to flee when the Taliban came back to power in 2021. The Times Literary Supplement described the book as brave and compelling. The Daily Telegraph listed it as one of the best sports books of 2024.

== Awards ==
In March 2017, to mark International Women's Day, Theirworld, a global education charity founded by Sarah Brown, recognized Popal's work as part of their #RewritingTheCode campaign. The purpose and mission of the campaign is to protest and challenge the prejudices and ideologies that deny women and young girls equal opportunities. In 2017, in alliance with Theirworld, Popal was given the 2017 Challenge Award.

Popal also received the Peace and Sport Award in 2017 for her efforts to use sport as a way to empower and further women's rights in Afghanistan. The Peace and Sport Award is dedicated to organizations and individuals who work towards peace, social stability, and dialogue through sport.

== Support ==
Support for the Afghan women's football team has grown. It is now legal for both men and women to show support for the team online and on social media. That being said, the team still faces many uphill battles. The team is unable to play matches in Afghanistan, as local officials have stated they can't ensure the safety of the players.

Currently living in Denmark with her family, Popal continues to fight for women's rights and equality in sport. She continues her work with the Afghanistan Women's National Football Team as their Program and Event Director.

After the return of the Talibans in power in Afghanistan in August-September 2021, she helps coordinate the evacuation of young female Afghan football players and their families, who eventually land in the UK on November 18, 2021.
