= Manozh Noori =

Afghan footballer

Personal information
- Position: Striker

Team information
- Current team: Melbourne Victory FC AWT

Senior career*
| Years | Team | Apps | (Gls) |
| 2022– | Melbourne Victory FC AWT | | |

International career
| 2025 | Afghanistan | 2 | (2) |
- * Club domestic league appearances and goals

Manozh Noori (born March 11, 2003) is an Afghan footballer who plays as a striker for Melbourne Victory FC AWT. She hails from Kabul.

== Career ==
Growing up in Kabul, Noori joined local clubs in Afghanistan. She wore a face covering to conceal her identity, specifically her older brother. Over six years she won league titles, national championships and individual awards.

In 2018, a teammate persuaded her to remove her face covering for a television interview. Her brother who was supporting her studies threatened to cut his ties to their family. Noori did stop playing football for a while.

Noori fled Afghanistan with her mother and sister when the Taliban took over following the takeover in 2021. In 2022, Noori signed for Australian seventh tier side Melbourne Victory FC AWT.
