= Pauline Hamill =

Scottish footballer (born 1971)

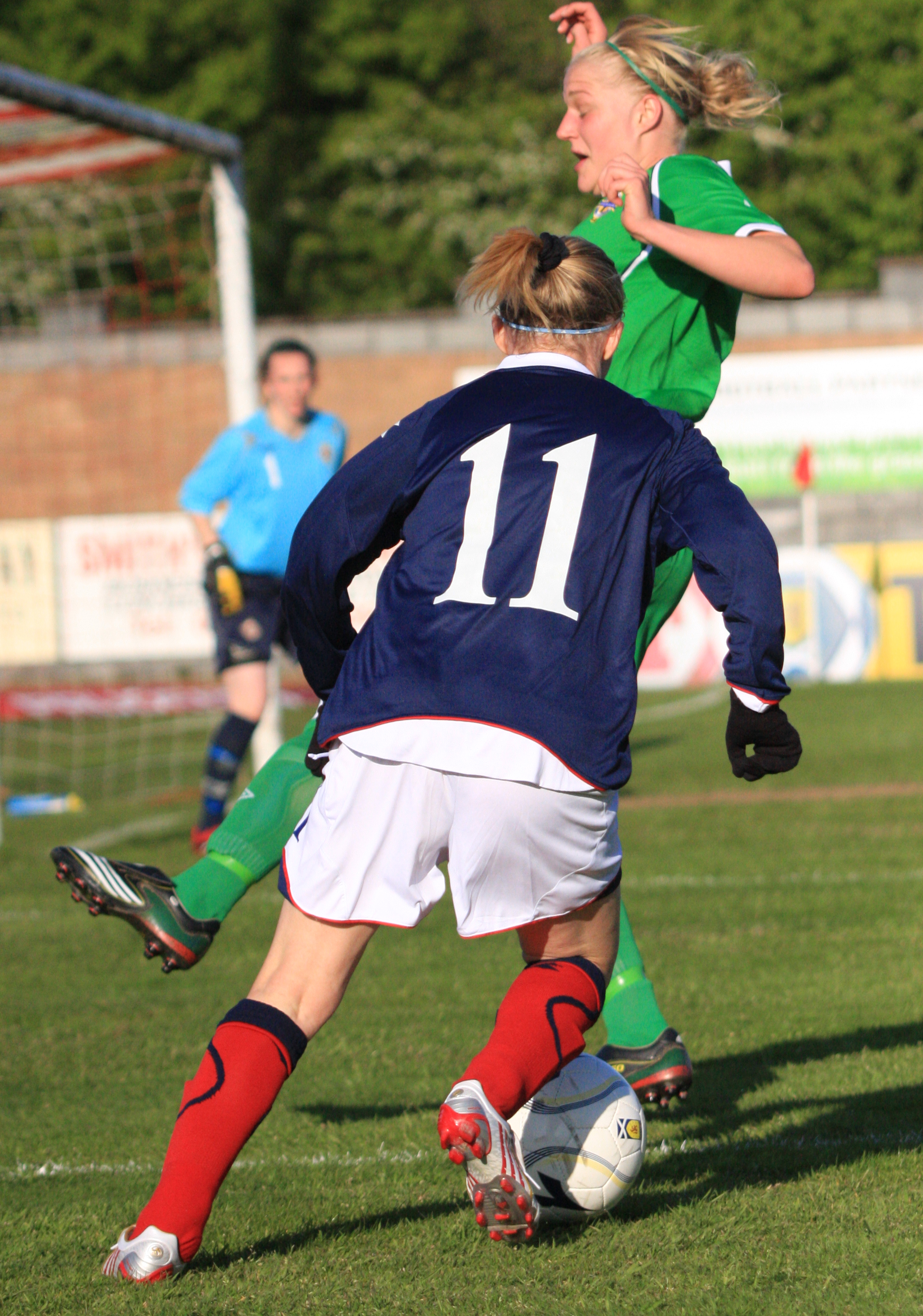
- Hamill (11) playing against Northern Ireland in May 2009

Personal information
- Date of birth: 18 December 1971 (age 54)
- Place of birth: Motherwell, Scotland
- Positions: Winger; striker

Team information
- Current team: Afghan Women United (head coach)

Youth career
- Craigburn Boys Club
- Coltness Ladies

Senior career*
Years	Team	Apps	(Gls)
- Cumbernauld Ladies
- Stenhousemuir Ladies
- Kilmarnock Ladies
2001	ÍBV		
2002–2005	Hibernian Ladies		
2005–2007	Doncaster Rovers Belles		
2007–2008	Hibernian Ladies		
2008	Blackburn Rovers Ladies		
2008–2009	Celtic		
2010	Spartans Women		
2011	Celtic		

International career
1992–2010	Scotland	141	(29)

Managerial career
- 2010–2017: Scotland U17
- 2017–2023: Scotland U19
- 2023–2024: Saudi Arabia U20
- 2025–: Afghan Women United (head coach)
- * Club domestic league appearances and goals

Pauline Hamill (born 18 December 1971) is a Scottish football coach and former international footballer, who currently serves as the head coach of Afghan Women United. She retired in 2011 while playing for Celtic in the Scottish Women's Premier League. A left–sided winger or forward, Hamill enjoyed a long career at club level with spells in Iceland and England.

Hamill made her senior Scotland debut in 1992 and amassed 141 appearances. She was the first woman to reach 100 caps for Scotland and her total was the highest by any Scottish player, male or female, at the time of her retirement.

== Club career ==
Brought up in Airdrie, Hamill played for Craigburn Boys U-12s and Coltness Ladies before commencing her senior career with 13 years at Cumbernauld Ladies.

Playing for Stenhousemuir in 1999–00, Hamill failed to score in a 9–0 Scottish Women's Cup final win over Clyde.

After switching to Kilmarnock Ladies, Hamill spent the 2001 summer season in Iceland with ÍBV and scored 16 goals in the Úrvalsdeild. Back with Kilmarnock for the following season, Hamill scored in the Ayrshire club's 2-0 Women's Scottish Cup final win over local rivals Ayr United.

Hamill then joined Hibernian Ladies and, in July 2004, made her debut in European club competition with the Hibees. In summer 2005 Hamill signed for English Premier League team Doncaster Rovers Belles, where she impressed as a goalscoring midfielder. After a short spell back with Hibernian, Hamill returned to England in January 2008 and finished 2007–08 with Blackburn Rovers Ladies.

Hamill joined Spartans ahead of the 2010 Scottish Women's Premier League season. She had been playing for Celtic in the intervening period. Hamill returned to Celtic for season 2011.

== International career ==
Hamill made her senior Scotland debut in a 1-0 Euro 1993 qualifier defeat to England in Walsall on 17 April 1992. In August 2007 Hamill became the first female player to win 100 caps for Scotland, in a friendly against Belgium at McDiarmid Park. Two months later Hamill won her 103rd cap, scoring in a 3–0 away win over Slovakia, overtaking Kenny Dalglish's record of 102 and becoming Scotland's most capped footballer of all time. Her 141st and last cap for the national team was in an away draw versus Denmark in 2010; her 29th and final goal against Bulgaria two months earlier had set a record as Scotland's oldest goalscorer (aged 38 years, 183 days) which still stands.

=== International goals ===
#	Date	Venue	Opponent	Result	Competition	Scored
1	27 October 2007	Slovakia, NTC Stadion, Senec	Slovakia	3–0	UEFA Women's Euro 2009 qualifying	16'
2	10 March 2008	Cyprus, Alpha Sports Center, Larnaca	Canada	2–0	Friendly	80'
3	28 September 2008	Scotland, McDiarmid Park, Perth	Slovakia	6–0	UEFA Women's Euro 2009 qualifying	38'
4	26 October 2008	Scotland, Tynecastle Stadium, Edinburgh	Russia	2–3	UEFA Women's Euro 2009 qualifying	3', 13'
5	30 October 2008	Russia, Spartak Stadium, Nalchik	Russia	2–1	UEFA Women's Euro 2009 qualifying	64'
6	12 March 2009	Cyprus, GSP Stadium, Nicosia	Russia	2–1	2009 Cyprus Women's Cup	27'

== Coaching career ==
In July 2003 Hamill became the first ever female coach at Rangers FC, when she was appointed to a youth development role at the Murray Park training complex.

In 2010, while still playing at club level, Hamill was appointed head coach of the Scotland women's under-17 squad, a position she held until 2017 when she moved up to the same role with the under 19s. She also headed up the SFA Women's National Academy at the University of Stirling, and holds a UEFA Pro Licence as a coach.

In December 2023, Hamill was appointed as the first head coach of the newly-formed Saudi Arabia women's under-20 team.

In 2025, Hamill was appointed as head coach of the FIFA-sanctioned Afghanistan women's national refugee team which became known as Afghan Women United.

== See also ==
- List of women's footballers with 100 or more caps
- Scottish FA Women's International Roll of Honour
