= Uzbekistan women's national under-20 football team =

National association football team

Uzbekistan
- Association: Uzbekistan Football Federation
- Confederation: AFC (Asia)
- Sub-confederation: CAFA (Central Asia)
- FIFA code: UZB
| First colours | Second colours |

First international
- Uzbekistan 1–5 Myanmar (India; 20 April 2002)

Biggest win
- Uzbekistan 20–0 Maldives (Bishkek, Kyrgyzstan; 24 October 2018)

Biggest defeat
- Uzbekistan 0–13 South Korea (Tashkent, Uzbekistan; 9 March 2024)

AFC U-20 Women's Asian Cup
- Appearances: 5 (first in 2002)
- Best result: Group stage (2002, 2004, 2015, 2017, 2024)

CAFA U-20 Women's Championship
- Appearances: 1 (first in 2021)
- Best result: Champions (2021)

The Uzbekistan women's national under-20 football team represents Uzbekistan in international football competitions at the qualifications of AFC U-19 Women's Championship and possible final tournaments if they qualify, as well as any other under-19 women's international football tournaments. It is governed by the Uzbekistan Football Federation.

== Results and fixtures ==
The following is a list of match results in the last 12 months, as well as any future matches that have been scheduled.

Legend

Win Draw Lose Fixture

== Players ==
=== Current squad ===
- The following players were called up for the 2023 JFA Women's U-20 Trio Tournament matches.
- Match dates: 17 and 19 February 2023
- Opposition: Iran and Jordan

| No. | Pos. | Player | Date of birth (age) | Club |
|---|---|---|---|---|
| 1 | GK | Fotima Bakhriddinova | 5 September 2004 (age 22) | (Uzbekistan Football Association) Pakhtakor |
| 12 | GK | Darya Teleshova | 6 February 2004 (age 22) | (Uzbekistan Football Association) Pakhtakor |
| 21 | GK | Zakhro Anorboeva | 28 November 2003 (age 22) | (Uzbekistan Football Association) Bunyodkor |
| | DF | Sevinch Rakhmatullaeva | 16 March 2005 (age 21) | (Uzbekistan Football Association) AGMK |
| | DF | Sevinch Kuchkorova | 30 November 2003 (age 22) | (Uzbekistan Football Association) AGMK |
| | DF | Sabina Zarubina | 4 February 2005 (age 21) | (Uzbekistan Football Association) Dinamo |
| | DF | Makhzuna Abdukarimova | 19 January 2005 (age 21) | (Uzbekistan Football Association) Lokomotiv |
| | DF | Zukhra Tursunalieva | 7 April 2004 (age 22) | (Uzbekistan Football Association) AGMK |
| | DF | Madina Shovkatova | 28 November 2003 (age 22) | (Uzbekistan Football Association) Sevinch |
| | MF | Alina Almatova | 8 February 2005 (age 21) | (Uzbekistan Football Association) Bunyodkor |
| | MF | Aygerim Otenazarova | 12 February 2004 (age 22) | (Uzbekistan Football Association) AGMK |
| | MF | Rukhsona Saidabbosova | 30 January 2006 (age 20) | (Uzbekistan Football Association) Metallurg |
| | MF | Etibor Shodieva | 30 November 2006 (age 19) | (Uzbekistan Football Association) Sevinch |
| | MF | Rukhshona Olimjonova | 28 November 2005 (age 20) | (Uzbekistan Football Association) AGMK |
| | FW | Leyla Rustullaeva | 14 August 2006 (age 20) | (Uzbekistan Football Association) AGMK |
| | FW | Oydinoy Turgunova | 15 March 2006 (age 20) | (Uzbekistan Football Association) AGMK |
| | FW | Umida Khatamova | 15 June 2004 (age 22) | (Uzbekistan Football Association) Pakhtakor |
| | FW | Leyla Oraniyazova | 18 October 2004 (age 22) | (Uzbekistan Football Association) Sevinch |
| | FW | Diyora Bakhtiyarova | 29 August 2007 (age 19) | (Uzbekistan Football Association) Bunyodkor |
| | FW | Asalkhon Aminjonova | 22 November 2003 (age 22) | (Uzbekistan Football Association) AGMK |
| | FW | Mekhribon Egamberdieva | 9 October 2007 (age 19) | (Uzbekistan Football Association) Sevinch |
| | FW | Sevara Ruzieva | 16 February 2004 (age 22) | (Uzbekistan Football Association) Qizilqum |
| | FW | Madinabonu Ergashalieva | 7 April 2004 (age 22) | (Uzbekistan Football Association) Pakhtakor |

== Competitive record ==
=== AFC U-20 Women's Asian Cup ===
| AFC U-20 Women's Asian Cup record | | | | | | | | | | Qualification record | | | | | | |
| Year | Round | Position | Pld | W | D | L | GS | GA | GD | Pld | W | D | L | GS | GA | GD |
|---|---|---|---|---|---|---|---|---|---|---|---|---|---|---|---|---|
| (India) 2002 | Group stage | 10th | 3 | 0 | 0 | 3 | 1 | 18 | −17 | No qualifying round | | | | | | |
| (China) 2004 | Group stage | 11th | 3 | 1 | 0 | 2 | 4 | 19 | −15 | No qualifying round | | | | | | |
| (Malaysia) 2006 | Did not qualify | | | | | | | | | 2 | 1 | 1 | 0 | 4 | 2 | +2 |
| (China) 2007 | Did not Enter | | | | | | | | | Did not Enter | | | | | | |
| (China) 2009 | Did not Enter | | | | | | | | | Did not Enter | | | | | | |
| (Vietnam) 2011 | Did not qualify | | | | | | | | | 6 | 3 | 1 | 2 | 13 | 9 | +4 |
| (China) 2013 | Did not qualify | | | | | | | | | 5 | 1 | 1 | 3 | 3 | 6 | −3 |
| (China) 2015 | Group stage | 7th | 3 | 0 | 0 | 3 | 0 | 17 | −17 | 3 | 3 | 0 | 0 | 12 | 0 | +12 |
| (China) 2017 | Group stage | 6th | 3 | 0 | 1 | 2 | 2 | 6 | −4 | 3 | 3 | 0 | 0 | 7 | 0 | +7 |
| (Thailand) 2019 | Did not qualify | | | | | | | | | 7 | 5 | 0 | 2 | 39 | 7 | +32 |
| (Uzbekistan) 2024 | Group Stage | 7th | 3 | 0 | 0 | 3 | 0 | 17 | −17 | Qualified as Hosts | | | | | | |
| (Thailand) 2026 | Quarter-finals | 7th | 4 | 1 | 0 | 3 | 5 | 10 | −5 | 3 | 2 | 1 | 0 | 19 | 3 | +16 |
| Total:6/12 | Quarter-finals | 6th | 19 | 2 | 1 | 16 | 12 | 87 | −75 | 29 | 18 | 4 | 7 | 97 | 27 | +54 |

=== CAFA U-20 Women's Championship ===
CAFA U-20 Women's Championship record
| Year | Round | Position | Pld | W | D* | L | GS | GA | GD |
|---|---|---|---|---|---|---|---|---|---|
| (Tajikistan) 2021 | Round-robin | 1st | 4 | 3 | 1 | 0 | 23 | 4 | +19 |
| Appearances | 1/1 | 1st | 4 | 3 | 1 | 0 | 23 | 4 | +19 |

== See also ==
- Sport in Uzbekistan
  - Football in Uzbekistan
    - Women's football in Uzbekistan
- Uzbekistan women's national football team
- Uzbekistan women's national under-17 football team
- Uzbekistan men's national football team
