= Defection of Iran women's national football team =

2026 expatriation event in Australia

During the March 2026 AFC Women's Asian Cup tournament in Australia, members of the Iran women's national football team refused to sing the anthem of the Islamic Republic of Iran before the match against the South Korean team, in a gesture of solidarity with ongoing protests and massacres in Iran. Shortly before the match, the 2026 Iran war began. Following the incident, Islamic Republic officials and figures threatened members of the team and called for the players to be prosecuted as "wartime traitors", an accusation punishable by death in Iran, raising concerns about their safety upon returning to the country.

The team was offered temporary asylum by the Australian government, and five members were extracted from their hotel. An additional three also chose to remain in Australia, while another player and a staff member defected at the airport before their teammates left the country. In total, seven members of the team and affiliated staff applied for asylum in Australia. In the days that followed, five of them withdrew their asylum applications and indicated a wish to return to Iran; three of those who had initially chosen to remain returned on 14 March, and a fifth player withdrew her asylum request on 15 March. IRIB state media stated the women had been subjected to psychological pressure while in Australia. Human rights activists stated that the withdrawals may have been influenced by threats against the players' families in Iran.

Two players, Fatemeh Pasandideh and Atefeh Ramezanizadeh, chose to remain in Australia and began training with the Brisbane Roar on 16 March 2026.

== Background ==
On 28 December 2025, a series of nationwide demonstrations against the Iranian government began, protesting the deepening economic crisis. The protests were triggered by a sharp depreciation of the Iranian rial, soaring inflation, and widespread shortages of essential goods. The unrest quickly spread to more than 100 cities, becoming the largest uprising in Iran since the 1979 Islamic Revolution, The ensuing crackdown, carried out under the orders of Ali Khamenei and senior officials, included an explicit order for government forces to use live ammunition against protesters. This resulted in massacres that left thousands of protesters dead, making them the largest massacres in modern Iranian history. Human Rights Activists News Agency (HRANA) said that at least 7,000 people had been killed. The Iranian government reported 3,117 deaths. Local health officials report the death toll could be as much as 30,000.

On 2 January 2026, US President Donald Trump threatened a "locked and loaded" military intervention in Iran if the government decided to kill those attending peaceful protests. On 13 January, he expressed support for Iranian anti-government protesters and pledged that "help is on the way" for them, and 10 days later he announced that a US "armada" was heading to the Middle East, including the aircraft carrier USS Abraham Lincoln and several guided-missile destroyers. On 13 February, Trump ordered the aircraft carrier USS Gerald R. Ford and its supporting warships to sail to the region. On 28 February, the 2026 Iran war broke out.

=== 2026 AFC Women's Asian Cup ===
In February 2026, ahead of the March 2026 AFC Women's Asian Cup in Australia, after a number of players resigned from the Iran women's national football team and refereeing organisation following the massacres, the Football Federation Islamic Republic of Iran reportedly threatened them with multi-year bans from professional football activities, as well as judicial action and prison sentences.

== National anthem incident ==
The women's tournament thus began against the backdrop of the start of the Iran war. Before Iran's opener against South Korea on 2 March, the Iranian players refused to sing their country's national anthem during their match at Robina Stadium. In response Iranian state media publicly described them as traitors. Paul Power, chief executive of the Refugee Council, stated that based on the available evidence "the women's soccer team are at risk if they're returned", and German-based journalist Ali Bornaei wrote how he believed that "the lives of the Iranian Women's National Football Team are in imminent danger. After their peaceful protest in Australia, Iranian state-linked media has officially labeled them 'wartime traitors'"; he added, "in Iran, 'treason' is a capital offense punishable by death. These athletes face arbitrary detention and execution if forced to return." He called upon the Australian Government to grant protection to the players.

Ahead of the following match against Australia on March 5th, the team were then reportedly forced to sing the national anthem, with threats to players' families if they refused. After the team's last group stage match against the Philippines on 8 March, players gave what appeared to be SOS hand signals from the bus as they were leaving. Trump subsequently also requested that the Australian Government take action and "give asylum" to the athletes, stating that "the US will take them if you won't".

== Asylum requests and rescue ==
According to a source who spoke to SBS News, the team was unable to move freely in their hotel, the RACV Royal Pines Resort, without being watched, being escorted, for example, to a conference room at mealtimes. In an address to the parliament, Home Affairs Minister Tony Burke stated that a police officer was stationed inside the hotel, who was instructed to provide the players with "the maximum amount of opportunities" for assistance.

On 9 March, five players—Fatemeh Pasandideh, Zahra Ghanbari, Zahra Sarbali, Atefeh Ramezanizadeh, and Mona Hamoudi—left the training camp and sought refuge from the Australian authorities. Ghanbari, who joined Persepolis W.F.C, is Iran's all-time top goalscorer, as well as being top scorer for her previous club, Bam Khatoon FC. The four others were also playing for Bam Khatoon, at the time the most titled of the Iranian women's league.

In the early hours of 10 March, it was reported that the women had been helped to escape by the Australian Federal Police (AFP), and had been granted humanitarian visas to stay in Australia. Shortly after their departure, the BBC witnessed the team's "minders" looking for them. Burke had been liaising with the AFP, and Prime Minister Anthony Albanese said that the team were safe in Australia. The government also said that the other players of the team were welcome to also request asylum; it was subsequently stated that another three players had chosen to do so. While the original five players were taken to a safe house by local police, the rest of the team was taken to Gold Coast Airport. As their bus was leaving the hotel, it was held up briefly by dozens of protesters chanting "Save our girls!", and according to The Guardian later, one of the women inside was in tears. Another, Mohaddesh Zolfi, and Zahra Soltan Meshkekar, a member of staff, later defected at Sydney Airport when the rest of the team boarded their connecting flight to their next matches in Malaysia. Albanese stated that it was ultimately "up to them" to ask for asylum. Sources close to the team have stated that for most players, asylum in Australia is not an option, as their families in Iran are "threatened and facing punishment if they do not return", said ABC News.

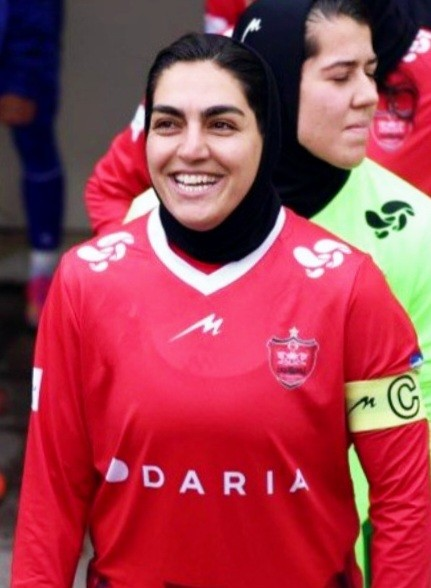
Zahra Ghanbari, Iran women's team's top goalscorer (returned)

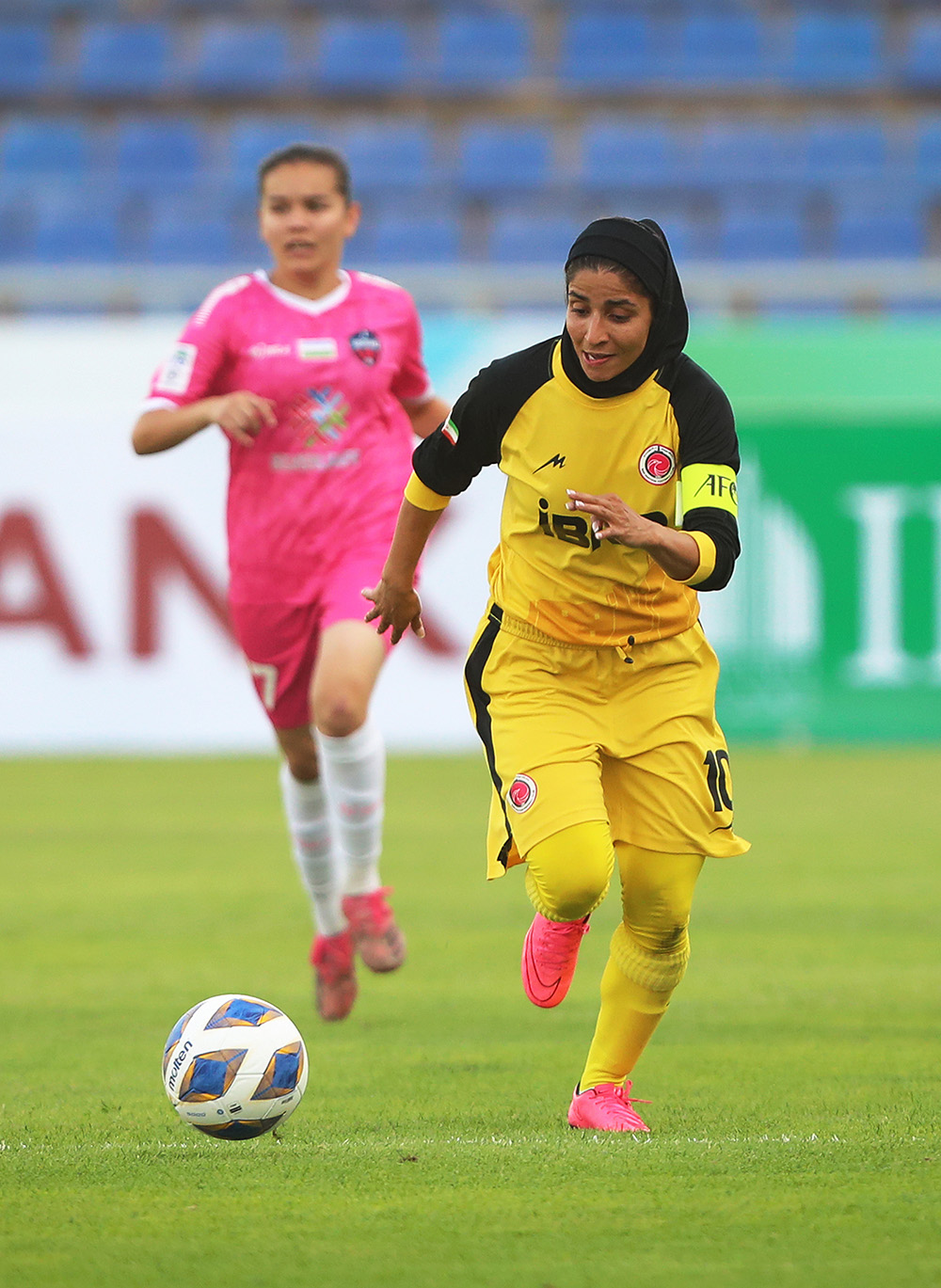
Atefeh Ramezanizadeh, captain of Bam Khatoon

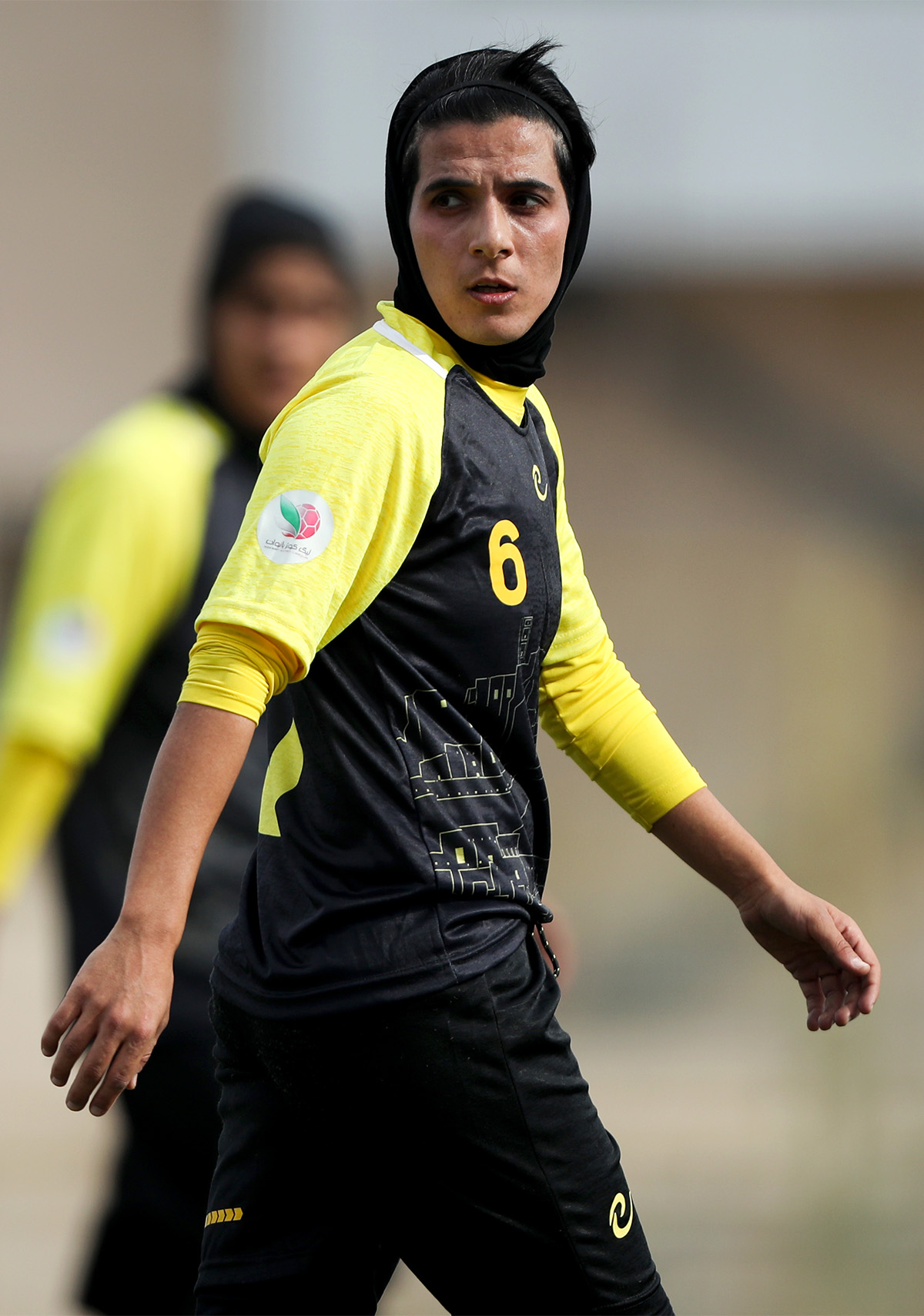
Zahra Sarbali playing for Bam Khatoon (returned)

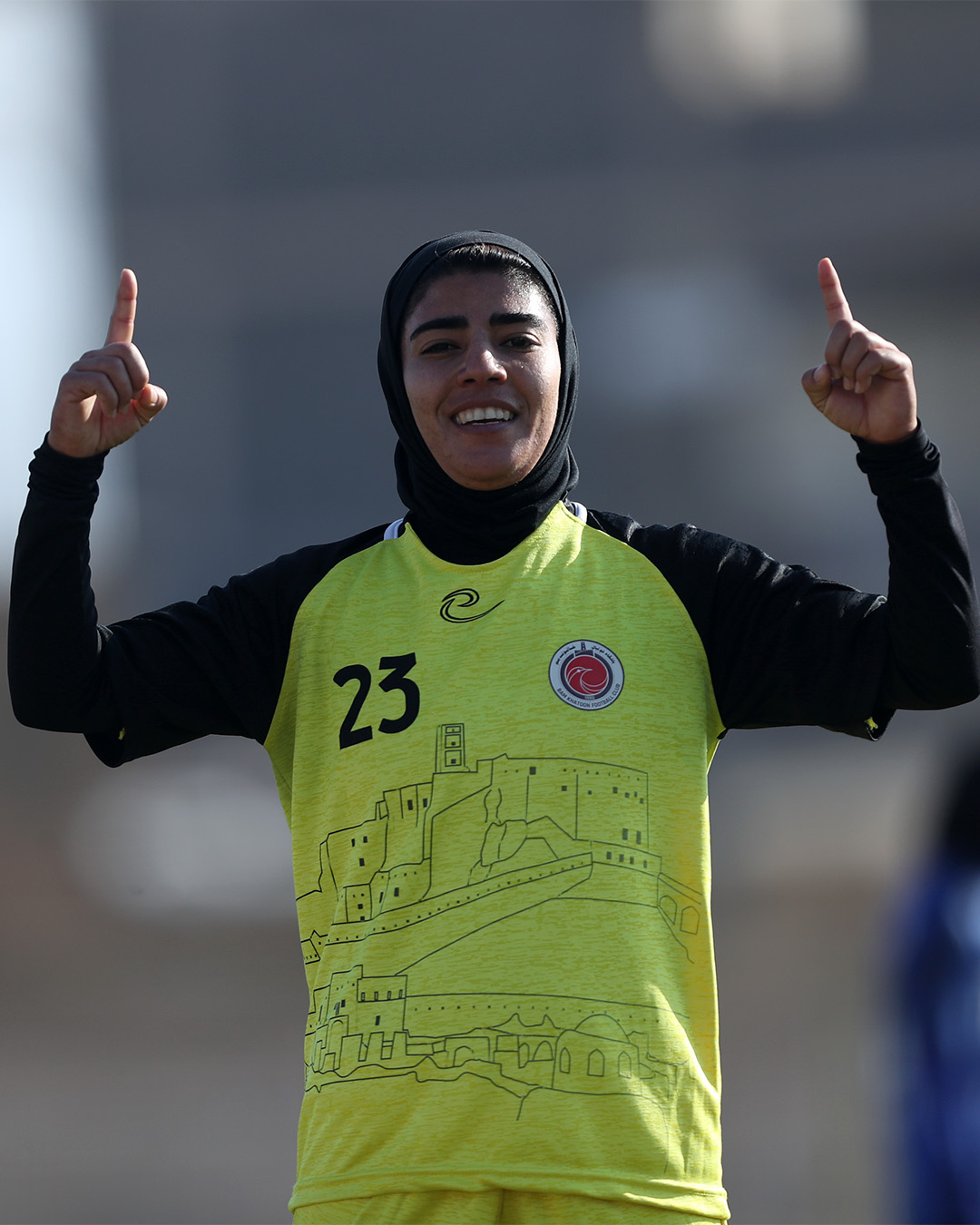
Mona Hamoudi playing for Bam Khatoon (returned)

The defection of the women's team was seen as a factor in the potential men's team's withdrawal from the 2026 FIFA World Cup, where all of their games would be in the United States, due to the risk of similar defections.

Nos Hosseini, a spokesperson for the Iranian Women's Association in Australia, said that even though the women had stated that they were not political, she feared that, based on previous actions by the Iranian Government, they would keep watch on the players who had stayed in Australia through their networks. The Iranian foreign ministry said the women's team would be welcomed back home "with open arms", and Iran's Vice-President Mohammad Reza Aref said the players' security would be guaranteed and accused Trump of interfering in Iranian affairs.

The mother of Zahra Ghanbari, captain of the football team, has been threatened by Iranian security bodies, including the intelligence unit of the Revolutionary Guards.

== Returns ==
By 15 March 2026, four members of the Iranian women's football team had changed their minds and decided to return to Iran. According to the semi-official Iranian outlet Tasnim News, "Mona Hamoudi, Zahra Sarbali, and Zahra Meshkinkar, two players and a member of the technical staff of the Iranian women's national football team, have withdrawn their asylum application in Australia". Three of the six who had accepted asylum remained in Australia. On 15 March, Zahra Ghanbari, another team member, was also reported to have decided to drop her asylum bid and return to Iran via Malaysia, leaving two that remained.

Iranian state media claimed the women had been subjected to psychological pressure while in Australia. Human rights activists said the women were pressured to reverse their asylum application by the government due to threats to their families. Some media reported that Iran was pressuring them to abandon their plans to stay in Australia and to return to Iran. On 16 March, the returning members of the Iranian women's football team travelled from Kuala Lumpur International Airport to Oman, with plans to return to Iran via Turkey.

Less than a month after returning to Iran, Zahra Ghanbari reportedly had her assets seized by the Islamic Republic.

== Players remaining in Australia ==
On 16 March 2026, the two players who chose to stay in Australia, Fatemeh Pasandideh and Atefeh Ramezanizadeh, started training with the Brisbane Roar. The update came as the Iranian women's football team was making its way back from Malaysia to Oman. In an April 2026 BBC interview with the two Iranian footballers, they said that Australia gave them "hope for a future where we can live and compete in safety". The two thanked both the Australian government for providing a safe haven and the support of the Iranian diaspora in Australia, for taking them in, enabling them to rebuild their lives.

== See also ==
- Afghan Women United, a football team of Afghan refugees following the 2021 Fall of Kabul
