= Fatemeh Pasandideh =

Iranian footballer (born 2004)

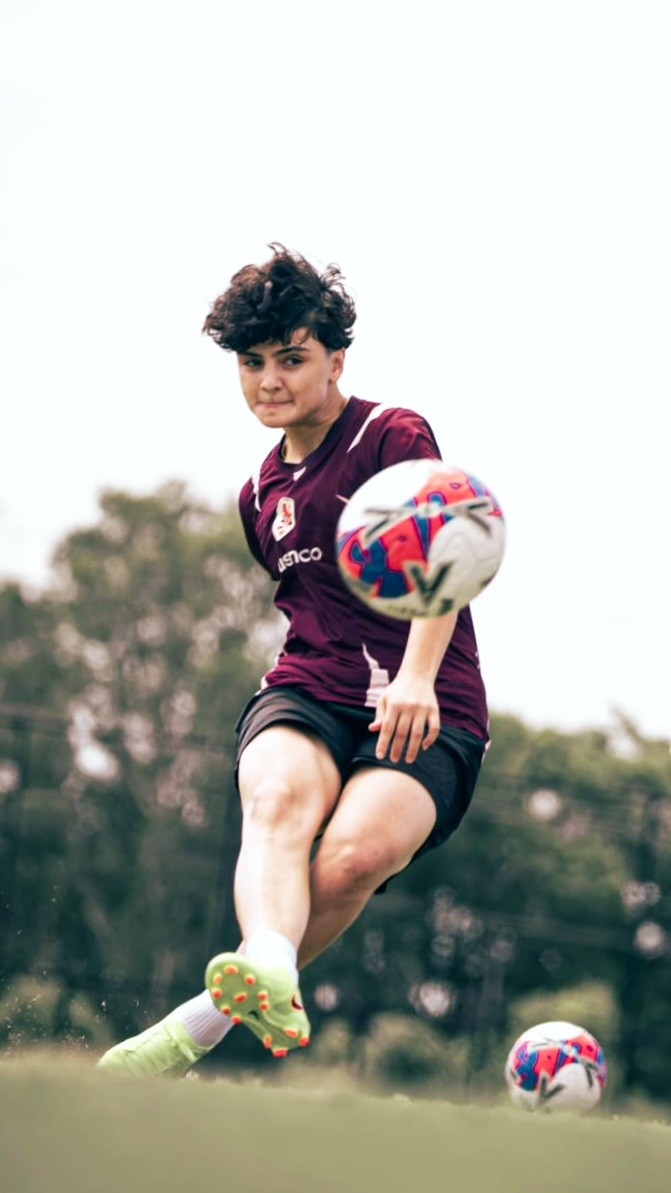

Personal information
- Date of birth: 8 April 2004 (age 22)
- Place of birth: Kermanshah, Iran
- Position: Midfielder

Senior career*
Years	Team	Apps	(Gls)
2024–2026	Bam Khatoon		

International career
2022–2026	Iran		
- * Club domestic league appearances and goals

Fatemeh "Pasand" Pasandideh (Persian: فاطمه پسندیده; born 8 April 2004) is an Iranian-Australian professional footballer who last played as a midfielder for the Kowsar Women Football League club Bam Khatoon and the Iran national team. As of September 2026 she is training with Wynnum Wolves FC in Brisbane.

== Early life and education ==
Fatemeh Pasandideh was born on 8 April 2004 in Kermanshah, Iran.

== Career ==
Pasandideh played as a midfielder for Bam Khatoon, which plays in the Kowsar Women Football League in Iran. She played for the club at the AFC Women's Champions League in its inaugural edition in 2024–5 and 2025–6. She wore number 9 at Bam Khatoon. After the club won the league in February 2026, Pasandideh posted on social media "A championship that found its meaning in the heart of sorrow, alongside the grieving mothers of my land and the noble people of Bam... The result of one year of effort and standing strong, out of respect for the pains that are never forgotten".

She has also played in the Iran's national women's team. In February 2026 she was announced as a member of the squad of 25 players by coach Marzieh Jafari for the 2026 AFC Women's Asian Cup, to be held in Australia. She played as No.10.

== Defection and life in Australia ==
In March 2026, Pasandideh, along with four teammates from the national football team, left the team's training camp in Australia after being eliminated from the tournament, and sought refuge due to fears of retaliation from Iranian authorities. After the start of the 2026 Iran war, the team had refrained from singing the Iranian national anthem before the first game of the tournament, and the Iranian state broadcaster released a video in which they called the women traitors, saying that they would be punished. The Australian Government under Anthony Albanese subsequently granted humanitarian visas to the players. Although most of the original group ended up changing their minds and returned to Iran, Pasandideh and Atefeh Ramezanizadeh chose to remain in Australia, and on 16 March 2026 started training with A-League Women team Brisbane Roar in Queensland.

Brisbane Roar's social media post about the women being welcomed to train with them, which included photos, went viral. Pasandideh posted a picture of herself with Jill Ellis, chief football officer of FIFA, and a peace sign emoji on Instagram, saying "Everything will be fine". British women's football magazine She Kicks wrote that Pasandideh's story is more than the story of a single footballer, but one that "shines a light on the challenges faced by women athletes in Iran and the courage it takes to speak – or stay silent – when the stakes are this high".

On 5 August 2026 Pasandideh, along with teammate Ramezanisadeh, were sworn in as Australian citizens by Home Affairs Minister Tony Burke.

As of September 2026 Pasandideh and Ramezanisadeh are both training with Wynnum Wolves FC, based at Carmichael Park in Brisbane, and aspire to play professional football in Australia.

== Personal life ==
Pasandideh goes by the name of "Pasand" in Australia.

As of September 2026 Pasandideh's mother lives in the Netherlands, while her father and brother remained in Iran. She believes that change will come to Iran one day.

On 6 September 2026 Pasandideh, along with Ramezanisadeh, told their stories on Nine Network's 60 Minutes. Pasandideh said "We just wanted to stand with our people. I was scared at times, but I just tried to do what was right, and to say that no one should be killed just for protesting".
