= Afghanistan women's national football team =

Women's national association football team representing Afghanistan

Afghanistan
- Nickname(s): The Lionesses of Afghanistan (د افغانستان زمریاني) (أسود أنثى أفغانستان)
- Association: Afghanistan Football Federation
- Confederation: AFC (Asia)
- Sub-confederation: CAFA (Central Asia)
- Top scorer: Marjan Haydaree (5)
- FIFA code: AFG
First colours	Second colours

FIFA ranking
- Current: NR (20 October 2026)
- Highest: 106 (December 2017 – March 2018)
- Lowest: 160 (December 2021)

First international
- Nepal 13–0 Afghanistan (Cox's Bazar, Bangladesh; 14 December 2010)

Last international
- Afghanistan 0–5 Tajikistan (Tashkent, Uzbekistan; 1 December 2018)

Biggest win
- Pakistan 0–4 Afghanistan (Colombo, Sri Lanka; 10 September 2012)

Biggest defeat
- Uzbekistan 20–0 Afghanistan (Tashkent, Uzbekistan; 23 November 2018)

CAFA Championship
- Appearances: 1 (first in 2018)
- Best result: Group stage (2018)

SAFF Championship
- Appearances: 4 (first in 2010)
- Best result: Semi-finals (2012)

The Afghanistan women's national football team (Note: Pashto: د افغانستان د ښځو د فوټبال ملي لوبډله Dari: تیم ملی فوتبال زنان افغانستان) was the women's national team of Afghanistan sanctioned by the Afghanistan Football Federation (AFF) until women's football was banned in their home country by the Taliban in 2021, but officially recognized by FIFA on April 2026.

In May 2025, FIFA sanctioned the creation of an Afghan women's refugee team later named Afghan Women United to represent the Afghan diaspora which would later be eligible to represent Afghanistan officially starting in April 2026.

== History ==
=== Islamic Republic (2007–2021) ===
The team was formed in 2007 by the Afghanistan National Olympic Committee with players drawn from among selected school girls in Kabul.

In an attempt to improve the quality of women's football, the team was sent to Germany in 2008 to hold a preparation camp. Later in the year, the Afghan team traveled to Jordan to participate in the Islamic Countries Women's Football Tournament.

In May 2010, Danish sports brand Hummel International sponsored male, female and youth teams of Afghanistan.

The 2010 SAFF Women's Championship in Bangladesh marked the first appearance of Afghanistan in a major international tournament. In it, they played their first official game, against Nepal, where they were defeated by an overwhelming 13–0 scoreline.

2016 marked a big year for the Afghanistan women's national team as they received support from the Afghanistan Football Federation and hired new coaching staff, comprising head coach Kelly Lindsey, assistant coach Haley Carter, and program director Khalida Popal.

In November 2018, male staff of the Afghanistan Football Federation were accused of sexual and physical abuse of Afghanistan women's players. The alleged abusers included the federation's president, Keramuudin Karim. In June 2019, FIFA imposed a life ban on Karim, barring him from all football-related activity after an investigation found him guilty of "having abused his position and sexually abused various female players".

The national team played their last official match, a 0–5 loss to Tajikistan, on December 1, 2018 at the 2018 CAFA Women's Championship

=== 2021 Taliban takeover and disbandment ===
Following the takeover of Afghanistan by the Taliban in August 2021, the national team players were evacuated out of the country. The Taliban has banned women's sports in the country including football. Coordinating with authorities from six countries, captain Khalida Popal and FIFPro facilitated the evacuation of the players and their families.

The AFF now has refused to recognize a women's national team; either consisting of diaspora or local players.

=== Players' exile and formation of Afghan Women United ===
The national team players in exile have played together. Australia-based players organized as Melbourne Victory FC AWT and joined Football Victoria in March 2022. In May 2022, an Afghan development side played a friendly against non-FIFA team Surrey in Dorking.

In 2023, Afghanistan was originally included in Asian qualifying tournament for Women's football in 2024 Summer Olympics, but they were forced to withdraw from the tournament as Afghanistan Football Federation did not plan to organize a women's national team.

There has been also campaign for Afghan women for FIFA to allow them to play as a national team independent from the AFF. In May 2025, FIFA sanctioned the creation of a Afghanistan women's refugee team under a one-year pilot-run basis. The Pauline Hamill-coached team later dubbed as Afghan Women United is still not recognized as formal national team by FIFA but played in the FIFA Unites: Women's Series friendly tournament against the Chad, Tunisia, and Libya national teams held in October to November 2025 in Morocco.

In April 2026, FIFA and AFC announced that Afghan Women United would be eligible to represent Afghanistan for official matches.

== Coaching history ==
Name	Period	Matches	Wins	Draws	Losses	Winning %
(Afghanistan) Abdul Saboor Walizada	2010–2013	10	3	2	5	30%
(Afghanistan) Faqir Zada	2014	3	0	0	3	0%
(Afghanistan) Amin Amini	2015	0	0	0	0	0%
(United States) Kelly Lindsey	2016–2017	2	0	0	2	0%
(Afghanistan) Ali Jawad Ataiee	2018–2021	6	0	0	6	0%

== Competitive record ==
=== FIFA Women's World Cup ===
FIFA Women's World Cup record									Qualification record					
Year	Round	Position	Pld	W	D	L	GF	GA	Pld	W	D	L	GF	GA
(China) 1991 to (China) 2007	Did not exist								Did not exist					
(Germany) 2011 to (France) 2019	Did not enter								Did not enter					
(Australia) (New Zealand) 2023	Withdrew from qualification								Via AFC Women's Asian Cup					
(Brazil) 2027	Did not enter								Did not enter					
Total	—	0/10	—	—	—	—	—	—	—	—	—	—	—	—

=== Summer Olympics ===
Summer Olympics record									Qualification record					
Year	Round	Position	Pld	W	D	L	GF	GA	Pld	W	D	L	GF	GA
(United States) 1996 to (China) 2008	Did not exist								Did not exist					
(United Kingdom) 2012 to (Japan) 2020	Did not enter								Did not enter					
(France) 2024	Withdrew from qualification								Withdrew					
(United States) 2028	Did not enter								Did not enter					
Total	—	0/8	—	—	—	—	—	—	—	—	—	—	—	—

=== AFC Women's Asian Cup ===
AFC Women's Asian Cup record									Qualification record					
Year	Round	Position	Pld	W	D	L	GF	GA	Pld	W	D	L	GF	GA
(Hong Kong) 1975 to (China) 2010	Did not exist								Did not exist					
(Vietnam) 2014 to (Jordan) 2018	Did not enter								Did not enter					
(India) 2022	Withdrew from qualification								Withdrew					
(Australia) 2026	Did not enter								Did not enter					
Total	—	0/21	—	—	—	—	—	—	—	—	—	—	—	—

=== CAFA Women's Championship ===
CAFA Women's Championship record
Year	Result	GP	W	D*	L	GS	GA	GD
(Uzbekistan) 2018	Group stage	4	0	0	4	0	32	−32
(Tajikistan) 2022	Did not enter							
Total	1/2	4	0	0	4	0	32	−32

*Denotes draws includes knockout matches decided on penalty kicks.

=== SAFF Women's Championship ===
SAFF Women's Championship record
Year	Result	GP	W	D*	L	GS	GA	GD
(Bangladesh) 2010	Group stage	3	0	1	2	2	18	−16
(Sri Lanka) 2012	Semi-final	4	1	1	2	6	19	−13
(Pakistan) 2014	Group stage	3	0	0	3	1	19	−18
(India) 2016	Group stage	2	0	0	2	1	11	−10
(Nepal) 2019	Did not enter							
(Nepal) 2022	Did not enter							
(Nepal) 2024	Did not enter							
(India) 2026	Did not enter							
Total	4/7	12	1	2	9	10	67	−57

*Denotes draws includes knockout matches decided on penalty kicks.

== Head-to-head record ==
Opponent	Pld	W	D	L	GF	GA	GD	W%	Confederation
Bangladesh	2	0	0	2	1	12	−13	0	AFC
India	3	0	0	3	1	28	−27	0	AFC
Iran	1	0	0	1	0	6	−6	0	AFC
Jordan	2	0	0	2	0	11	−11	0	AFC
Kazakhstan	1	0	0	1	0	2	−2	0	UEFA
Kyrgyzstan	2	1	0	1	1	1	0	50	AFC
Maldives	3	0	2	1	3	4	−1	0	AFC
Nepal	2	0	0	2	1	20	−19	0	AFC
Pakistan	2	1	0	1	4	3	+1	50	AFC
Qatar	1	1	0	0	2	0	+2	100	AFC
Tajikistan	1	0	0	1	0	5	−5	0	AFC
Uzbekistan	1	0	0	1	0	20	−20	0	AFC
Total	21	3	2	16	13	112	−99		—

== See also ==
- Afghanistan men's national football team
- Sport in Afghanistan
  - Football in Afghanistan
    - Women's football in Afghanistan
