= Afghanistan Football Federation =

Governing body of football in Afghanistan

AFC
- Short name: AFF
- Founded: 1933; 93 years ago
- Headquarters: Kabul, Afghanistan
- FIFA affiliation: 1948 (77 years ago)
- AFC affiliation: 1954 (71 years ago)
- CAFA affiliation: 2015 (10 years ago)
- President: Mohammad Kargar
- Website: the-aff.org

The Afghanistan Football Federation (Note: Pashto: د افغانستان د فوټبال فدراسیون Dari: فدراسيون فوتبال افغانستان) (abbreviated as AFF) is the governing body of football in Afghanistan, overseeing the organization, promotion, and regulation of all national teams and leagues. Established in 1933, the AFF joined FIFA in 1948 and became a member of the Asian Football Confederation (AFC) in 1954. The organization is headquartered in Kabul, Afghanistan.

== History ==
The AFF has played a pivotal role in the development and popularization of football in Afghanistan, despite significant challenges posed by decades of political instability and conflict.

One of its most notable achievements came in 2013 when the Afghanistan national football team won the South Asian Football Federation Championship, marking the country’s first-ever international football trophy. This victory was widely celebrated as a unifying moment for the nation.

In recognition of its efforts to promote fair play and sportsmanship amidst adversity, the AFF was awarded the FIFA Fair Play Award for 2013. The award was presented at the prestigious FIFA Ballon d'Or ceremony in early 2014.

== Women's football ==
The AFF during the Islamic Republic era organized an Afghanistan women's national team. However, women's football was banned after the Taliban takeover in 2021.

== League system and domestic competitions ==
The AFF operates Afghanistan's domestic football league system, including the Afghanistan Champions League, which was founded in 2021. The ACL features teams representing various regions of Afghanistan, aiming to foster talent at the grassroots level and promote unity through sport.

In addition to the Champions League, the AFF organizes tournaments and programs to support youth development and engage local communities in football activities. These initiatives are part of the federation's broader strategy to rebuild and strengthen football infrastructure in Afghanistan.

== Board members ==
Name	Position	Source
(Afghanistan) Mohammad Kargar	President	
(Afghanistan) Behram Siddiqui	General Secretary	
(Afghanistan) Abdul Haq Faizi	Treasurer	
(Afghanistan) Mohammed Hashimi	Media And Communication Manager	
(Afghanistan) Hamed Maiwand	Technical Director	
(Uzbekistan) Usmon Toshev	Team Coach (Men's)	
(Afghanistan) Delawar Khaled	Chairperson of the Referees Committee	
(Afghanistan) Walid Allah Habibi	Team Coach (Men's)	
(Afghanistan) Delawar Khaled	Head/Director of the Referees Department	
(Afghanistan) Hamed Maiwand	Referee Coordinator	
(South Korea) Kim Jae Seok	Team Coach (Men's)	

== Asian Football Confederation executive member ==
Term	Name	Elected	Until
1	(Afghanistan) Sayed Ali Reza Aghazada	2019	

== Membership ==
Organization	Affiliation	Notes
FIFA	since 1948; 78 years ago	—N/a
AFC	since 1954; 72 years ago	—N/a
SAFF	2005–2015; 10 years	—N/a
CAFA	since 2015; 11 years ago	Founding member

== Presidents ==
Presidency	President	Took office	Left office	Note
1	Mohammad Yousef Kargar	2019	present	winner of 2013 SAFF Championship winner of FIFA Fair Play Award 2013
