= 2024 CAFA U-18 Women's Championship =

Tournament details
- Host country: Tajikistan
- City: Dushanbe
- Dates: 19 – 28 April 2024
- Teams: 5 (from 1 sub-confederation)
- Venue: 1 (in 1 host city)

Final positions
- Champions: Iran (2nd title)
- Runners-up: Uzbekistan
- Third place: Kyrgyz Republic

Tournament statistics
- Matches played: 10
- Goals scored: 55 (5.5 per match)
- Top scorer(s): (Uzbekistan) Shahnoza Dekanbaeva (8 goals)
- Best player: (Iran) Somayeh Esmaeili
- Fair play award: Turkmenistan

The 2024 CAFA U-18 Women's Championship was the 2nd edition of CAFA U-18 Women's Championship, the biennial international youth football championship organised by CAFA for the women's under-19 national teams of Central Asia. The tournament was held in Dushanbe, Tajikistan.

A total of five teams participated in the tournament, with players born on or after 1 January 2006 eligible to participate.

Iran were the defending champions, and successfully defended the title after finishing top of the standing unbeaten.

== Participating nations ==
5 (out of 6) CAFA nations entered the final tournament. with Turkmenistan debuting in the tournament after missing the inaugural edition.

Team	Appearance	Last appearance	Previous best performance
Iran	2nd	2022 (Champions)	Champions (2022)
Kyrgyz Republic	2nd	2022 (Third place)	Third place (2022)
Tajikistan	2nd	2022 (Fourth place)	Fourth place (2022)
Turkmenistan	1st	Debut	
Uzbekistan	2nd	2022 (Runners-up)	Runners-up (2022)

== Venues ==
Matches were held at the Republic Central Stadium.

Dushanbe	2024 CAFA U-18 Women's Championship (Tajikistan)
Republic Central Stadium	2024 CAFA U-18 Women's Championship (Tajikistan)
Capacity: 20,000	2024 CAFA U-18 Women's Championship (Tajikistan)

== Main tournament ==
The main tournament schedule was announced on 12 April 2024.

Pos	Team	Pld	W	D	L	GF	GA	GD	Pts	Final result
1	Iran	4	3	1	0	17	3	+14	10	Champions
2	Uzbekistan	4	3	0	1	24	6	+18	9	Runners-up
3	Kyrgyz Republic	4	2	1	1	8	8	0	7	Third place
4	Tajikistan (H)	4	1	0	3	4	15	−11	3	
5	Turkmenistan	4	0	0	4	2	23	−21	0	

Source: CAFA
Rules for classification: Tiebreakers
(H) Hosts
21 April 2024
13:00

Turkmenistan	1–3	Kyrgyz Republic
Haipova 67'	Report	A. Turgunbaeva 22'; F. Turgunbaeva 47' (pen.); Gaparova 90+4'

Republic Central Stadium, Dushanbe
Attendance: 83
Referee: Nodira Mirzoeva (Tajikistan)
21 April 2024
16:00

Iran	4–2	Uzbekistan
Birang Kivaj 42'; Dini 48'; Esmaeili 58'; Jahanshahi 84'	Report	Dekanbaeva 5'; Bakhtiyarova 25' (pen.)

Republic Central Stadium, Dushanbe
Referee: Arslan Goshanov (Turkmenistan)

22 April 2024
15:00

Turkmenistan	0–7	Iran
	Report	Esmaeili 10', 21'; Jahanshahi 14'; Khanlarzadehmirkolaei 27'; Dini 45', 74'; Mansoralvares 65'

Republic Central Stadium, Dushanbe
Attendance: 30
Referee: Keremet Ismailova (Kyrgyz Republic)
22 April 2024
18:00

Kyrgyz Republic	3–0	Tajikistan
Gaparova 4', 34', 74'	Report

Republic Central Stadium, Dushanbe
Referee: Nasibabonu Toshmuhammedova (Uzbekistan)

24 April 2024
15:00

Uzbekistan	6–1	Kyrgyz Republic
Aminjonova 22', 40', 59'; Jumaboeva 29'; Bakhtiyarova 44'; Mamtkulova 86'	Report	Kanatbekova 54'

Republic Central Stadium, Dushanbe
Attendance: 25
Referee: Arslan Goshanov (Turkmenistan)
24 April 2024
18:00

Tajikistan	4–0	Turkmenistan
Normurodova 19'; Elmuratova 32'; Ustoeva 43'; Saidova 75'	Report

Republic Central Stadium, Dushanbe
Referee: Mahnaz Zokaee (Iran)

26 April 2024
15:00

Uzbekistan	9–1	Turkmenistan
Dekanbaeva 1', 7', 38', 48'; Aminjonova 10'; Norboeva 18', 53'; Bakhtiyarova 32'; Eshtemirova 87'	Report	Alymjanova 12'

Republic Central Stadium, Dushanbe
Attendance: 35
Referee: Nodira Mirzoeva (Tajikistan)
26 April 2024
18:00

Iran	5–0	Tajikistan
Dini 16', 75'; Esmaeili 30', 88'; Jahanshahi 83'	Report

Republic Central Stadium, Dushanbe
Attendance: 45
Referee: Keremet Ismailova (Kyrgyzstan)

28 April 2024
15:00

Kyrgyz Republic	1–1	Iran
Karataeva 90+2'	Report	Rahmani Khoshgod 66'

Republic Central Stadium, Dushanbe
Attendance: 60
Referee: Nasibabonu Toshmuhammedova (Uzbekistan)
28 April 2024
18:00

Tajikistan	0–7	Uzbekistan
	Report	Dekanbaeva 17', 31' (pen.), 37'; Norboeva 34', 36'; Aminjonova 48'; Akramova 89'

Republic Central Stadium, Dushanbe
Referee: Mahnaz Zokaee (Iran)

== Player awards ==
The following awards were given at the conclusion of the tournament:

Top Goalscorer	Best player	Fair Play award	Special award
(Uzbekistan) Shahnoza Dekanbaeva	(Iran) Somayeh Esmaeili	Turkmenistan	Tajikistan

== Goalscorers ==
There were 55 goals scored in 10 matches, for an average of 5.5 goals per match.

8 goals

- (Uzbekistan) Shahnoza Dekanbaeva

5 goals

- (Iran) Somayeh Esmaeili
- (Iran) Maryam Dini
- (Uzbekistan) Asalkhona Aminjonova

4 goals

- (Kyrgyzstan) Alina Gaparova
- (Uzbekistan) Zarina Norboeva

3 goals

- (Iran) Tania Jahanshahi
- (Uzbekistan) Diyora Bakhtiyarova

1 goal

- (Iran) Maedeh Birang Kivaj
- (Iran) Seyedehzahra Khanlarzadehmirkolaei
- (Iran) Nazaninzahra Mansoralvares
- (Iran) Parina Rahmani Khoshgod
- (Kyrgyzstan) Asem Turgunbaeva
- (Kyrgyzstan) Fatima Turgunbaeva
- (Kyrgyzstan) Nurmira Kanatbekova
- (Kyrgyzstan) Aiana Karataeva
- (Tajikistan) Charoskhon Normurodova
- (Tajikistan) Uljamol Elmuratova
- (Tajikistan) Shukrona Ustoeva
- (Tajikistan) Marjona Saidova
- (Turkmenistan) Lale Haipova
- (Turkmenistan) Lachyn Alymjanova
- (Uzbekistan) Nargiza Eshtemirova
- (Uzbekistan) Laziza Jumaboeva
- (Uzbekistan) Dilnura Mamtkulova
- (Uzbekistan) Durdona Akramova

Source: CAFA
