= 2026 AFC U-17 Women's Asian Cup qualification =

International football tournament

Tournament details
- Host countries: Tajikistan (Group A); Saudi Arabia (Group B); Myanmar (Group C); Vietnam (Group D); Singapore (Group E); Thailand (Group F); Kyrgyzstan (Group G); Jordan (Group H)
- Dates: 13–17 October 2025
- Teams: 27 (from 1 confederation)

Tournament statistics
- Matches played: 30
- Goals scored: 173 (5.77 per match)

The 2026 AFC U-17 Women's Asian Cup qualification was the qualification process organized by the Asian Football Confederation (AFC) to determine the participating teams for the 2026 AFC U-17 Women's Asian Cup, the 10th edition of the international women's under-17 football championship of Asia. Therefore, players born on or after 1 January 2009 were eligible to participate.

A total of 12 teams qualified to play in the final tournament in China. The host country China and the top three teams of the previous tournament (North Korea, Japan, and South Korea) qualified automatically, while the other eight teams were decided by qualification, with the matches played between 13 and 17 October 2025 in centralised venues.

== Draw ==
Of the 47 Asian Football Confederation (AFC) member associations, a total of 27 teams entered the competition. The four teams, including the hosts China who qualified for the 2025 FIFA U-17 Women's World Cup, automatically qualified for the final tournament.

The draw was held on 7 August 2025 at Kuala Lumpur, Malaysia at 14:00 local time (UTC+8).

The 27 teams were allocated to three groups of four teams and five groups of three teams, with teams seeded based on a points system derived from their final rankings across the previous three editions (overall ranking shown in parentheses). A further restriction was also applied, with the eight teams serving as qualification group hosts drawn into separate groups.

Bye to the final tournament
1. **North Korea**
2. **Japan**
3. **South Korea**
4. **China** (final tournament hosts)

Teams entering the qualification round
	Pot 1	Pot 2	Pot 3	Pot 4
Host teams	**Thailand** (1) **(H)**; **Vietnam** (4) **(H)**	**Myanmar** (10) **(H)**; Singapore (11) **(H)**	Jordan (17) **(H)**; Kyrgyzstan (18) **(H)**; Tajikistan (22) **(H)**	Saudi Arabia (24) **(H)**
Remaining teams	**Australia** (2); **Philippines** (3); Bangladesh (5); **India** (6); Iran (7); Indonesia (8)	**Chinese Taipei (9)**; Malaysia (16); Uzbekistan (12); Hong Kong (15); **Lebanon** (13); Nepal (14)	Mongolia (20) **(W)**; Turkmenistan (23); Guam (19); Northern Mariana Islands (21)	Kuwait (24); Macau (24); Syria (24)

Notes

- Teams in **bold** advanced to the final tournament.
- (H): Qualification group hosts.
- (W): Withdrew after draw.

Did not enter

- Afghanistan
- Bahrain
- Bhutan
- Brunei
- Cambodia
- Iraq
- Laos
- Maldives
- Oman
- Pakistan
- Palestine
- Qatar
- Sri Lanka
- Timor-Leste
- United Arab Emirates
- Yemen

== Groups ==
=== Group A ===
- All matches were held in Tajikistan.
- Times listed are UTC+5.

Pos	Team	Pld	W	D	L	GF	GA	GD	Pts	Qualification
1	Philippines	3	3	0	0	11	0	+11	9	Final tournament
2	Malaysia	3	2	0	1	3	4	−1	6	
3	Syria	3	1	0	2	1	6	−5	3	
4	Tajikistan (H)	3	0	0	3	0	5	−5	0	

Source: AFC
Rules for classification: Qualification tiebreakers
(H) Hosts
13 October 2025
14:00

Philippines	5–0	Syria
Enderes 4', 44'; K. Mizzo 50'; Evangelista 52'; Muros 72'	Report

Pamir Stadium, Dushanbe
13 October 2025
17:00

Malaysia	2–0	Tajikistan
Laila 15'; Dishanna 84' (pen.)	Report

Pamir Stadium, Dushanbe

15 October 2025
14:00

Syria	0–1	Malaysia
	Report	Zafirah 9'

Pamir Stadium, Dushanbe
15 October 2025
17:00

Tajikistan	0–2	Philippines
	Report	Evangelista 11'; Dagpin 90+5'

Pamir Stadium, Dushanbe
Referee: Yang Shu-ting (Chinese Taipei)

17 October 2025
14:00

Philippines	4–0	Malaysia
Rivera 6'; C. Mizzo 23'; Sia 59'; Dania 68' (o.g.)	Report

Pamir Stadium, Dushanbe
17 October 2025
17:00

Tajikistan	0–1	Syria
	Report	Nivin Baddour 47'

Pamir Stadium, Dushanbe

=== Group B ===
- All matches were held in Saudi Arabia.
- Times listed are UTC+3.

Pos	Team	Pld	W	D	L	GF	GA	GD	Pts	Qualification
1	Lebanon	3	2	1	0	13	2	+11	7	Final tournament
2	Iran	3	2	0	1	12	2	+10	6	
3	Saudi Arabia (H)	3	1	1	1	13	4	+9	4	
4	Kuwait	3	0	0	3	0	30	−30	0	

Source: AFC
Rules for classification: Qualification tiebreakers
(H) Hosts
13 October 2025
16:15

Lebanon	9–0	Kuwait
Issa 11', 46', 55'; Abou Melheb 19', 27'; Habbal 24'; Boustany 81'; Geitani 83'; Osman 90+1'	Report

Prince Saud bin Jalawi Stadium, Khobar
13 October 2025
20:15

Iran	2–0	Saudi Arabia
Jarfarnia 41' (pen.); Ghorbani 49'	Report

Prince Saud bin Jalawi Stadium, Khobar

15 October 2025
16:15

Kuwait	0–10	Iran
	Report	Hosseini 4'; Dehghaninia 15'; Ansari 25'; Khalili Far 48', 71', 73', 79'; Jafarnia 76', 83'; Kouravand 81'

Prince Saud bin Jalawi Stadium, Khobar
15 October 2025
20:15

Saudi Arabia	2–2	Lebanon
Al-Dhuhiyan 2', 22'	Report	Geitani 32'; Frangieh 68' (pen.)

Prince Saud bin Jalawi Stadium, Khobar

17 October 2025
16:15

Iran	0–2	Lebanon
	Report	Abou Melheb 61'; Issa 66'

Prince Saud bin Jalawi Stadium, Khobar
17 October 2025
20:15

Kuwait	0–11	Saudi Arabia
	Report	Al-Dhuhiyan 1', 3', 15', 46'; S. Al-Yahya 36', 69', 85'; Al-Shnaifi 45+2', 88'; Zahra Talib 59'; M. Al-Yahya 90+3'

Prince Saud bin Jalawi Stadium, Khobar

=== Group C ===
- All matches were held in Yangon, Myanmar.
- Times listed are UTC+6:30.

Pos	Team	Pld	W	D	L	GF	GA	GD	Pts	Qualification
1	Myanmar (H)	2	2	0	0	8	0	+8	6	Final tournament
2	Indonesia	2	1	0	1	2	1	+1	3	
3	Macau	2	0	0	2	0	9	−9	0	
4	Mongolia	0	0	0	0	0	0	0	0	Withdrew

Source: AFC
Rules for classification: Qualification tiebreakers
(H) Hosts
13 October 2025
15:30

Indonesia	2−0	Macau
Jazlyn 57'; Katarina 60'	Report

Padaythar Football Stadium, Yangon
Referee: Doumouh Al Bakkar (Lebanon)

15 October 2025
16:00

Macau	0−7	Myanmar
	Report	Shin Thant Phyu Sin Pyone 2', 60', 63'; Pin Myint Yan 19', 45'; L L Sai Hwal Nan 42'; Khaing Zin Myint 45+2'

Thuwunna Stadium, Yangon
Referee: Trần Thị Thanh (Vietnam)

17 October 2025
16:00

Indonesia	0−1	Myanmar
	Report	Shin Thant Phyu Sin Pyone 45'

Thuwunna Stadium, Yangon
Referee: Mu Mingxin (China)

=== Group D ===
- All matches were held in Vietnam.
- Times listed are UTC+7.

Pos	Team	Pld	W	D	L	GF	GA	GD	Pts	Qualification
1	Vietnam (H)	2	2	0	0	6	0	+6	6	Final tournament
2	Hong Kong	2	1	0	1	7	2	+5	3	
3	Guam	2	0	0	2	1	12	−11	0	

Source: AFC
Rules for classification: Qualification tiebreakers
(H) Hosts
13 October 2025
16:00

Guam	0–5	Vietnam
	Report	Nguyễn Thị Minh Ánh 21', 41', 73'; Hà Yến Nhi 54'; Lê Thị Hồng Thái 87'

Gò Đậu Stadium, Ho Chi Minh City
Referee: Rawdha Almansoori (United Arab Emirates)

15 October 2025
16:00

Hong Kong	7–1	Guam
Wan Tsz Yau 3'; Cheng Reina 22', 47'; Wong Tsz Yiu 40'; Chong Ching Lam 45'; Chua Sophia 50', 65'	Report	Ettleman 20'

Gò Đậu Stadium, Ho Chi Minh City
Referee: Wang Chieh (Chinese Taipei)

17 October 2025
16:00

Vietnam	1–0	Hong Kong
Ngô Hải Yến 66'	Report

Gò Đậu Stadium, Ho Chi Minh City
Referee: Esra'a Al-Mbaidin (Jordan)

=== Group E ===
- All matches were held in Singapore.
- Times listed are UTC+8.

Pos	Team	Pld	W	D	L	GF	GA	GD	Pts	Qualification
1	Australia	2	1	0	1	11	3	+8	3	Final tournament
2	Singapore (H)	2	1	0	1	11	11	0	3	
3	Northern Mariana Islands	2	1	0	1	3	11	−8	3	

Source: AFC
Rules for classification: Qualification tiebreakers
(H) Hosts
13 October 2025
19:30

Northern Mariana Islands	3–0 Awarded (Note: The Asian Football Confederation stated that Australia fielded an ineligible player, Tyra Bagiante who had previously represented Tonga at the 2024 OFC U-16 Women's Championship and had not completed a change of association to Australia before featuring in this game—a violation of Article 25.1 of the AFC Disciplinary and Ethics Code; therefore, Australia is considered the losing team for this match.)	Australia
	Report	Corbett 1'; Rako 4', 9', 27', 51'; Mouitys-Mickalad 10'; Sullivan 18'; Sarris 35'; Puckett 41'; Calvanese 44', 58', 69'; Leong 45+2'; Nicholas 47', 77'; George 50' (o.g.); Bagiante 52', 56'; Muir 54', 87'; Pearson 67'; Hussein 74'

Bishan Stadium, Singapore

15 October 2025
19:30

Singapore	11–0	Northern Mariana Islands
Qadriyah 3'; Rizqyqa 33', 56'; Ng 40'; Dodson 53'; Suresh 57', 59', 74'; Rickit 67'; Lim 86'; Chin 90+4'	Report

Bishan Stadium, Singapore
Referee: Om Choki (Bhutan)

17 October 2025
19:30

Australia	11–0	Singapore
Mouitys-Mickalad 12', 14', 18', 21'; Corbett 27'; Pearson 29'; Rako 37', 45+2', 75'; Sarris 44'; Nicholas 62'	Report

Bishan Stadium, Singapore

=== Group F ===
- All matches were held in Thailand.
- Times listed are UTC+7.

Pos	Team	Pld	W	D	L	GF	GA	GD	Pts	Qualification
1	Thailand (H)	2	2	0	0	29	0	+29	6	Final tournament
2	Nepal	2	0	1	1	0	12	−12	1	
3	Turkmenistan	2	0	1	1	0	17	−17	1	

Source: AFC
Rules for classification: Qualification tiebreakers
(H) Hosts
13 October 2025
18:30

Turkmenistan	0–17	Thailand
	Report	Pattaramon 5', 42', 50', 75', 85'; Kurisara 8' (pen.), 22', 31', 44'; Charlotte 16', 25'; Monthida 27', 28'; Kawinthida 46'; Arisa 61'; Pattarawee 68', 79'

Chonburi Stadium, Chonburi
Referee: Jon Sol-mi (North Korea)

15 October 2025
18:30

Nepal	0–0	Turkmenistan
	Report

Chonburi Stadium, Chonburi
Referee: Georgia Ghirardello (Australia)

17 October 2025
18:30

Thailand	12–0	Nepal
Monthida 5', 17'; Kurisara 6', 31', 37', 45+1', 52'; Pattaramon 12', 90+2'; Charlotte 18', 62'; Ashika Karki 55' (o.g.)	Report

Chonburi Stadium, Chonburi
Referee: Cha Min-ji (South Korea)

=== Group G ===
- All matches were held in Kyrgyzstan.
- Times listed are UTC+6.

Pos	Team	Pld	W	D	L	GF	GA	GD	Pts	Qualification
1	India	2	2	0	0	4	2	+2	6	Final tournament
2	Kyrgyzstan (H)	2	1	0	1	3	3	0	3	
3	Uzbekistan	2	0	0	2	2	4	−2	0	

Source: AFC
Rules for classification: Qualification tiebreakers
(H) Hosts
13 October 2025
19:00

Kyrgyzstan	1−2	India
Saiakbaeva 34'	Report	P. Fernandes 26'; Nongmaithem 90'

Dolen Omurzakov Stadium, Bishkek
Referee: Haneen Murad (Jordan)

15 October 2025
19:00

Uzbekistan	1−2	Kyrgyzstan
Alikhonova 52'	Report	Makhamatsalieva 35'; Saiakbaeva 49'

Dolen Omurzakov Stadium, Bishkek
Referee: Plong Pich Akara (Cambodia)

17 October 2025
19:00

India	2–1	Uzbekistan
Baskey 55'; Kumari 66'	Report	Alikhonova 38'

Dolen Omurzakov Stadium, Bishkek
Referee: Park Se-jin (South Korea)

=== Group H ===
- All matches were held in Jordan.
- Times listed are UTC+3.

Pos	Team	Pld	W	D	L	GF	GA	GD	Pts	Qualification
1	Chinese Taipei	2	2	0	0	11	1	+10	6	Final tournament
2	Jordan (H)	2	0	1	1	2	7	−5	1	
3	Bangladesh	2	0	1	1	1	6	−5	1	

Source: AFC
Rules for classification: Qualification tiebreakers
(H) Hosts
13 October 2025
19:00

Jordan	1–1	Bangladesh
Jarrar 89'	Report	Prity 3'

Aqaba Stadium, Aqaba
Referee: Gulshoda Saitkulova (Uzbekistan)

15 October 2025
19:00

Chinese Taipei	6–1	Jordan
Chang Hu-Hsin 4', 36', 68'; Wang Yu-Hsin 52'; Fang Yi-Ai 74'; Chen Pin-Yen 84'	Report	Minwer 83'

Aqaba Stadium, Aqaba
Referee: Khin Nyein Chan (Myanmar)

17 October 2025
19:00

Bangladesh	0–5	Chinese Taipei
	Report	Woo Cai-Xuan 6'; Chung Yun-Chien 33'; Yang Yi-Ai 66'; Wu Yen-Yu 90+1'; Hsiao Yu-Hui 90+3'

Aqaba Stadium, Aqaba
Referee: Ananthip Phophan (Thailand)

== Qualified teams ==
The following teams qualified for the 2026 AFC U-17 Women's Asian Cup.

Team	Qualified as	Date qualified	Appearance	Previous best performance
China	Hosts	14 April 2025	10th	Runners-up (2005)
North Korea	2024 champions	16 May 2024	9th	Champions (2007, 2015, 2017, 2024)
Japan	2024 runners-up	16 May 2024	10th	Champions (2005, 2011, 2013, 2019)
South Korea	2024 third place	19 May 2024	10th	Champions (2009)
Philippines	Group A winners	17 October 2025	2nd	Group stage (2024)
Lebanon	Group B winners	17 October 2025	1st	Debut
Myanmar	Group C winners	17 October 2025	2nd	Group stage (2009)
Vietnam	Group D winners	17 October 2025	2nd	Group stage (2019)
Australia	Group E winners	17 October 2025	8th	Fourth place (2009, 2019)
Thailand	Group F winners	17 October 2025	10th	Third place (2005)
India	Group G winners	17 October 2025	2nd	Group stage (2005)
Chinese Taipei	Group H winners	17 October 2025	5th	Group stage (2005, 2009, 2013, 2015)

== See also ==
- 2026 AFC Women's Asian Cup qualification
- 2026 AFC U-20 Women's Asian Cup qualification
- 2026 AFC U-17 Asian Cup qualification
- 2026 AFC U-23 Asian Cup qualification
