= India women's national under-17 football team =

National association football team

India Women's U-17
- Nickname: Young Tigresses
- Association: All India Football Federation
- Confederation: AFC (Asia)
- Sub-confederation: SAFF (South Asia)
- Head coach: Joakim Alexandersson
- Captain: Abhista Basnett
- FIFA code: IND
| First colours | Second colours |

First international
- Thailand 6–4 India (Namhae, South Korea; 16 April 2005)

Biggest win
- India 14–0 Iraq (Kuala Lumpur, Malaysia; 5 October 2026)

Biggest defeat
- India 0–8 United States (Bhubaneswar, India; 11 October 2022); South Korea 8–0 India (Buriram, Thailand; 19 September 2023)

World Cup
- Appearances: 1 (first in 2022)
- Best result: Group stage (2022)

Asian Cup
- Appearances: 2 (first in 2005)
- Best result: Quarter-final (2026)

SAFF Championship
- Appearances: 6 (first in 2017)
- Best result: Champions (2018, 2019, 2025)
Medal record
SAFF U-17 Women's Championship
| Gold medal – first place | 2018 Bhutan |
| Gold medal – first place | 2019 Bhutan |
| Gold medal – first place | 2025 Bhutan |
| Silver medal – second place | 2017 Bangladesh |
| Silver medal – second place | 2024 Nepal |
| Bronze medal – third place | 2023 Bangladesh |

The Indian women's national under-17 football team represents India in international women's under-17 football. The team is controlled by the governing body for football in India, the All India Football Federation (AIFF). The federation is a member of the Asian Football Confederation (AFC) and the regional South Asian Football Federation (SAFF).

The team have only participated twice in the AFC U-17 Women's Asian Cup, back during the tournament's inaugural edition and the 2026 edition, and has qualified for the 2027 edition.

== History ==
=== FIFA U-17 Women's World Cup ===
FIFA first organised the U-17 Women's World Cup in the year 2008 and has since organised it on every even years. From Asia, the top three teams from AFC U-16 Women's Championship used to qualify for the world cup, but India failed to qualify for any of the AFC championships from the 2007 edition to 2017, thus failing to qualify for the first six editions of the World Cup.

India was selected as the host of the 2022 FIFA U-17 Women's World Cup and thus automatically qualified for the tournament. It was supposed to be their first participation in the World Cup, but their participation was under threat after the All India Football Federation was suspended by FIFA and the hosting rights for the tournament were stripped from India. However, the AIFF was later reinstated by FIFA and the tournament rights were given back to India, confirming their participation for the tournament.

India went on to lose all 3 matches in the group stage, scoring 0 goals and finishing with 0 points, bowing out of the tournament.

=== AFC U-17 Women's Asian Cup ===
India women's U17 team first played their international match at the inaugural edition of AFC U-17 Women's Asian Cup in 2005 where they first faced Thailand and got defeated by 6−4 on 16 April 2005. In the second match South Korea defeated them again by 7−0, but in the third match India registered their first win defeating Indonesia by 6−0 but they failed to proceed beyond the group stage.

They returned to the continental championship in 2026 after emerging as Group G winners in the qualifiers. India lost the first match 2–0 against Australia and the second match 3–0 against Japan. But they won their third match 4–0 against Lebanon, and finished 3rd in the group and qualified for the quarter finals as the second best third placed team. In the quarter finals, they lost to China 3–0, ending their journey in the tournament.

=== SAFF U-15 Women's Championship ===
SAFF U15 Women's championship was first organised in 2017, where India became runners-up after being defeated by Bangladesh by a solitary goal. In the next edition in 2018, the final was repeated again, but this time India beat Bangladesh by a solitary goal and become the SAFF champion. In the 2019 SAFF U-15 Women's Championship, India and Bangladesh reached the final for the third time. Both the teams failed to score any goals within the regulation time. Thus penalty shoot-out became the match decider where Bangladesh failed to convert the first spot kick, which resulted in India becoming the champion by a 5−3 result in the shoot-out.

India further finished runner's up in 2024 and third in 2023. They became champions again in 2025, emerging as the most successful team in the tournament.

=== BRICS U-17 Football Cup ===
In 2018, at the second edition of BRICS U-17 Football Cup, which is a U-17 Football tournament played among teams of five BRICS countries, the U17 women's teams of the respective countries were invited to play in the tournament. India played round robin matches, first against South Africa, and suffered a loss by 5−1, then suffered another defeat against Russia by 3−1. In their next match Brazil defeated them by 5−0 and in their last match they lost 2−1 to China.

=== SAFF U-19 Women's Championship ===
SAFF U19 Women's championship was organized in 2026 and was its 7th edition, where India fielded their U17 team as their U19 team is out to Sweden for preparations for 2026 AFC U-20 Women's Asian Cup. They became the champions after being defeated by Bangladesh by a 4-0 goal lead. This was a deciding factor in the final as India already lost against Bangladesh in the group stage of the championship. It came as the team was way younger than all other teams and were also preparing for 2026 AFC U-17 Women's Asian Cup.

== Results and fixtures ==
For past match results of the under-17 team, see the results in Indian football seasons.

Matches in the last 12 months, and future scheduled matches

Legend

Win Draw Loss Fixture

=== 2026 ===
| 31 January 2026 2026 SAFF U19 Gr. Stage | India | 1–0 | Nepal U19 | Pokhara, Nepal |
| 14:45 UTC+5:30 | Fernandes 49' | Report | | Stadium: Pokhara Rangasala; Attendance: 116; Referee: Tshering Yangkhey (Bhutan) |

| 2 February 2026 2026 SAFF U19 Gr. Stage | Bangladesh U19 | 2–0 | India | Pokhara, Nepal |
| 11:45 UTC+5:30 | Biswas 29'; Akhter 40' | Report | | Stadium: Pokhara Rangasala; Attendance: 250; Referee: Choki Om (Bhutan) |

| 4 February 2026 2026 SAFF U19 Gr. Stage | India | 8–0 | Bhutan U19 | Pokhara, Nepal |
| 11:45 UTC+5:30 | Lyngdoh 6'; Basnett 10'; Fernandes 16', 38', 40'; Linda 17'; Barman 25', 89' | Report | | Stadium: Pokhara Rangasala; Attendance: 150; Referee: Saraban Tahura (Bangladesh) |

| 7 February 2026 2026 SAFF U19 Final | Bangladesh U19 | 0–4 | India | Pokhara, Nepal |
| 14:45 UTC+5:30 | | Report | Nongmaithem 42'; Lakra 63' (pen.); P. Fernandes 68'; Raghuraman 83' | Stadium: Pokhara Rangasala; Referee: Om Choki (Bhutan) |

| 12 March 2026 Friendly | Myanmar | 0–2 | India | Yangon. Myanmar |
| 16:00 IST | | Report | Barman 38', 49' | Stadium: Thuwunna Stadium; Referee: Zin Mar Oo (Myanmar) |

| 14 March 2026 Friendly | Myanmar | 2–3 | India | Yangon. Myanmar |
| 16:00 IST | War Kyaw 12'; May Zitar 45' | Report | Senjam 33'; A. Kumari 88'; Joya 90+1' | Stadium: Thuwunna Stadium; Referee: Khin Nyein Chan (Myanmar) |

| 11 April 2026 Friendly | Russia | 4–0 | India | Sochi, Russia |
| 14:30 IST | Menyailova 44'; Dobrovitskaya 57' (pen.); Klimova 72' (pen.); Gulyaeva 88' | RFU; AIFF | | Stadium: Matsesta Football Center |

| 14 April 2026 Friendly | Russia | 3–0 | India | Sochi, Russia |
| 14:30 IST | Svyatnaya 18'; Menyailova 49', 52' | RFU; AIFF | | Stadium: Matsesta Football Center; Referee: Alexandra Ponomareva (Russia) |

| 17 April 2026 Friendly | Russia | 3–0 | India | Sochi, Russia |
| 14:30 IST | Menyailova 46'; Frolova 80'; Bykhanova 90+2' | RFU; AIFF | | Stadium: Matsesta Football Center; Referee: Nadezhda Gorinova (Russia) |

| 2 May 2026 2026 AFC U17 WAC GS | Australia | 2–0 | India | Suzhou, China |
| 17:00 IST | Mouitys-Mickalad 25'; Basnett 59' (o.g.) | Report | | Stadium: Suzhou Taihu Football Sports Centre (Pitch 8); Attendance: 80; Referee: Maïka Vanderstichel (France) |

| 5 May 2026 2026 AFC U17 WAC GS | India | 0–3 | Japan | Suzhou, China |
| 17:00 IST | Hayashi 59'; Ikeda 76', 81' | Report | | Stadium: Suzhou Taihu Football Sports Centre (Pitch 4); Attendance: 124; Referee: Trần Thị Thanh (Vietnam) |

| 8 May 2026 2026 AFC U17 WAC GS | India | 4–0 | Lebanon | Suzhou, China |
| 13:00 IST | Barman 7', 85'; Senjam 36'; Joya 72' | Report | | Stadium: Suzhou Taihu Football Sports Centre (Pitch 8); Attendance: 37; Referee: Sunita Thongthawin (Thailand) |

| 11 May 2026 2026 AFC U17 WAC QF | China | 3–0 | India | Suzhou, China |
| 17:00 IST | Huang Qinyi 38'; Liu Yuxi 45+4' (pen.); Li Qixian 90' | Report | | Stadium: Suzhou Sports Centre Stadium; Attendance: 1,375; Referee: Park Se-jin (South Korea) |

| 27 August 2026 Friendly | Uzbekistan | 0–0 | India | Tashkent, Uzbekistan |
| 17:00 IST | | Report | | Stadium: UFA National Football Centre |

| 30 August 2026 Friendly | Uzbekistan | 0–0 | India | Tashkent, Uzbekistan |
| 17:00 IST | | Report | | Stadium: UFA National Football Centre |

| 26 September 2026 Friendly | India | 2–4 | Philippines | Goa, India |
| 16:00 IST | A. Kumari 85'; Joya 89' | Report | ? 47', 50', 68', 79' | Stadium: Vagator Football Ground |

| 29 September 2026 Friendly | India | 2–0 | Philippines | Goa, India |
| 16:00 IST | A. Kumari 26' (pen.), 50' | Report | | Stadium: Vagator Football Ground |

| 5 October 2026 2027 AFC U17 WACQ | India | 14–0 | Iraq | Selayang, Malaysia |
| 16:00 UTC+8 | A. Kumari 9', 12', 39', 47', 71'; Baskey 14'; Sorokhaibam 21', 30'; Longjam 42'; Barman 49'; Basnett 70', 86'; Hasan 78'; Senjam 90+3' | Report | | Stadium: MP Selayang Stadium; Referee: Lê Thị Ly (Vietnam) |

| 8 October 2026 2027 AFC U17 WACQ | Syria | 0–2 | India | Selayang, Malaysia |
| 16:00 UTC+8 | | Report | A. Kumari 5', 55' | Stadium: MP Selayang Stadium; Referee: Supiree Testhomya (Thailand) |

| 11 October 2026 2027 AFC U17 WACQ | India | 4–0 | Malaysia | Selayang, Malaysia |
| 20:00 UTC+8 | Chingkhamayum 28'; Barman 50'; A. Kumari 56'; Kumar 86' | Report | | Stadium: MP Selayang Stadium; Referee: Hanine Merhi (Lebanon) |

== Team staff ==
As of 2026

| Position | Name |
|---|---|
| Head coach | (Sweden) Joakim Alexandersson |
| Assistant coaches | (India) Anthony Andrews (India) Nivetha Ramadoss |
| Goalkeeper coach | (India) Fysal K Bappu |
| Performance Analyst | (India) Shrivatsa Joglekar |
| Physiotherapist | (India) Asmin Dsouza |
| Team manager | (India) Hemanshi Gour |
| Media manager | (India) Akhil Rawat |

== Players ==
=== Current squad ===
The following 23 players were called up for the 2027 AFC U-17 Women's Asian Cup qualifiers.

Caps and goals are correct as of 11 October 2026, after the match against Malaysia.

| No. | Pos. | Player | Date of birth (age) | Caps | Goals | Club |
|---|---|---|---|---|---|---|
| | GK | Munni Bhambhu | 2 April 2010 (age 16) | 26 | 0 | (All India Football Federation) Sethu |
| | GK | Sanatombi Devi Irengbam | | 0 | 0 | (All India Football Federation) ICSA Irengbam |
| | GK | Sonam Ghosh | | 0 | 0 | (All India Football Federation) Zinc Football |
| | DF | Abhista Basnett (captain) | 11 March 2011 (age 15) | 24 | 7 | (All India Football Federation) Kickstart |
| | DF | Ambalika Chanu Khundongbam | | 1 | 0 | (All India Football Federation) Nita |
| | DF | Daina Devi Konthoujam | | 1 | 0 | (All India Football Federation) YWC Langthabal |
| | DF | Joyshini Chanu Huidrom | 17 January 2010 (age 16) | 2 | 0 | (All India Football Federation) YWC Thambalkhong |
| | DF | Ritu Badaik | 5 June 2011 (age 15) | 15 | 0 | (All India Football Federation) Nita |
| | DF | Taniya Devi Tonambam | 18 May 2010 (age 16) | 16 | 0 | (All India Football Federation) YWC Thambalkhong |
| | MF | Alva Devi Senjam | 12 November 2010 (age 16) | 15 | 3 | (All India Football Federation) YWC Thambalkhong |
| | MF | Bonifilia Shullai | 2 February 2010 (age 16) | 20 | 2 | (All India Football Federation) Garhwal United |
| | MF | Julan Nongmaithem | 15 February 2011 (age 15) | 24 | 5 | (All India Football Federation) Kickstart |
| | MF | Monika Devi Wairokpam | | 1 | 0 | (All India Football Federation) Youth Welfare Club |
| | MF | Pritika Barman | 11 March 2010 (age 16) | 21 | 9 | (All India Football Federation) West Bengal |
| | MF | Redima Devi Chingkhamayum | 3 March 2011 (age 15) | 16 | 1 | (All India Football Federation) FC Imphal |
| | MF | Silky Devi Sorokhaibam | | 3 | 2 | (All India Football Federation) Youth Welfare Club |
| | MF | Thandamoni Baskey | 9 March 2010 (age 16) | 27 | 2 | (All India Football Federation) East Bengal |
| | MF | Yashica Haribabu | | 2 | 0 | (All India Football Federation) Kickstart |
| | FW | Anushka Kumari | 9 December 2010 (age 15) | 27 | 23 | (All India Football Federation) Kickstart |
| | FW | Deepika Kumari | | 1 | 0 | (All India Football Federation) Nita |
| | FW | Joya Kabul Hasan | 20 February 2011 (age 15) | 11 | 3 | (All India Football Federation) Punjab |
| | FW | Nidhi Kumar | | 1 | 1 | (All India Football Federation) Juba Sangha |
| | FW | Nira Chanu Longjam | | 14 | 5 | (All India Football Federation) Manipur |

=== Recent call-ups ===
The following footballers were part of a national selection in the past twelve months, but are not part of the current squad.

| Pos. | Player | Date of birth (age) | Caps | Goals | Club | Latest call-up |
|---|---|---|---|---|---|---|
| GK | Surajmuni Kumari | 12 March 2009 (age 17) | 4 | 0 | (India) Indian Arrows | 2026 AFC U-17 Asian Cup |
| GK | Tamphasana Devi Konjengbam | 14 May 2009 (age 17) | 0 | 0 | (India) YWC Thambalkhong | 2026 AFC U-17 Asian Cup |
| GK | Shelna Maria Sajit | | 0 | 0 | (India) Kerala | 2026 SAFF U-19 Championship |
| GK | Thameena Fathima | | 0 | 0 | (India) Kerala | 2026 AFC U-17 Asian Cup qualifiers |
| DF | Alena Devi Sarangthem | 20 May 2009 (age 17) | 16 | 0 | (India) Nita | 2026 AFC U-17 Asian Cup |
| DF | Alisha Lyngdoh | 23 November 2009 (age 16) | 13 | 1 | (India) Indian Arrows | 2026 AFC U-17 Asian Cup |
| DF | Divyani Linda | 1 January 2009 (age 17) | 25 | 4 | (India) Indian Arrows | 2026 AFC U-17 Asian Cup |
| DF | Elizabed Lakra | 16 June 2009 (age 17) | 25 | 1 | (India) Indian Arrows | 2026 AFC U-17 Asian Cup |
| DF | Akashi Naik | 27 February 2010 (age 16) | 1 | 0 | (India) Odisha | 2026 SAFF U-19 Championship |
| DF | Binita Horo | | 2 | 0 | (India) Jharkhand | 2026 SAFF U-19 Championship |
| DF | Priya | 15 December 2009 (age 16) | 0 | 0 | (India) Indian Arrows | 2025 SAFF U-17 Championship |
| DF | Sharvari Mane | | 0 | 0 | (India) Maharashtra | Uzbekistan, August 2026 |
| MF | Olivia Chanu Ningthoujam | 2 April 2009 (age 17) | 5 | 0 | (India) Kickstart | 2026 AFC U-17 Asian Cup |
| MF | Shveta Rani | 26 January 2009 (age 17) | 12 | 3 | (India) Indian Arrows | Myanmar, March 2026 |
| MF | Anita Dungdung | 1 January 2009 (age 17) | 6 | 1 | (India) Indian Arrows | 2026 SAFF U-19 Championship |
| MF | Beena Kumari | | 1 | 0 | (India) Jharkhand | 2025 SAFF U-17 Championship |
| FW | Anwita Raghuraman | 17 January 2010 (age 16) | 10 | 2 | (India) Sethu | 2026 AFC U-17 Asian Cup |
| FW | Pearl Fernandes | 9 June 2009 (age 17) | 23 | 14 | (India) Sesa | 2026 AFC U-17 Asian Cup |
| FW | Valaina Fernandes | 3 September 2009 (age 17) | 15 | 1 | (India) Indian Arrows | 2026 AFC U-17 Asian Cup |
^{PRE} Preliminary squad / standby

== Competitive record ==
=== FIFA U-17 Women's World Cup ===
FIFA U-17 Women's World Cup record
| Host/Year | Result | Pld | W | D* | L | GF | GA | GD |
|---|---|---|---|---|---|---|---|---|
| (New Zealand) 2008 | Did not qualify | | | | | | | |
| (Trinidad and Tobago) 2010 | Did not qualify | | | | | | | |
| (Azerbaijan) 2012 | Did not qualify | | | | | | | |
| (Costa Rica) 2014 | Did not qualify | | | | | | | |
| (Jordan) 2016 | Did not qualify | | | | | | | |
| (Uruguay) 2018 | Did not qualify | | | | | | | |
| (India) 2022 | Group stage | 3 | 0 | 0 | 3 | 0 | 16 | −16 |
| (Dominican Republic) 2024 | Did not qualify | | | | | | | |
| (Morocco) 2025 | Did not qualify | | | | | | | |
| (Morocco) 2026 | Did not qualify | | | | | | | |
| Total: 1/9 | Group stage | 3 | 0 | 0 | 3 | 0 | 16 | −16 |

Red border indicates the team played as the host of the tournament.

FIFA U-17 Women's World Cup History
| Year | Round | Score | Result |
|---|---|---|---|
| 2022 | Group Stage | India 0–8 United States | Loss |
| 2022 | Group Stage | India 0–3 Morocco | Loss |
| 2022 | Group Stage | India 0–5 Brazil | Loss |

=== AFC U-17 Women's Asian Cup ===
| AFC U-17 Women's Asian Cup record | | | | | | | | | Qualification record | | | | | | |
| Host/Year | Result | Pld | W | D* | L | GF | GA | GD | Pld | W | D* | L | GF | GA | GD |
|---|---|---|---|---|---|---|---|---|---|---|---|---|---|---|---|
| (South Korea) 2005 | Group stage | 3 | 1 | 0 | 2 | 10 | 13 | −3 | No Qualification | | | | | | |
| (Malaysia) 2007 | Did not participate | | | | | | | | No Qualification | | | | | | |
| (Thailand) 2009 | Did not qualify | | | | | | | | 3 | 1 | 0 | 2 | 4 | 4 | 0 |
| (China) 2011 | Did not qualify | | | | | | | | 2 | 0 | 0 | 2 | 0 | 6 | −6 |
| (China) 2013 | Did not qualify | | | | | | | | 3 | 0 | 2 | 1 | 4 | 7 | –3 |
| (China) 2015 | Did not qualify | | | | | | | | 4 | 3 | 0 | 1 | 21 | 6 | +15 |
| (Thailand) 2017 | Did not qualify | | | | | | | | 4 | 2 | 0 | 2 | 9 | 11 | −2 |
| (Thailand) 2019 | Did not qualify | | | | | | | | 4 | 2 | 1 | 1 | 12 | 4 | +8 |
| (Indonesia) 2022 | Cancelled | | | | | | | | Cancelled | | | | | | |
| (Indonesia) 2024 | Did not qualify | | | | | | | | 5 | 3 | 0 | 2 | 6 | 13 | −7 |
| (China) 2026 | Quarter-finals | 4 | 1 | 0 | 3 | 4 | 8 | −4 | 2 | 2 | 0 | 0 | 4 | 2 | +2 |
| (China) 2027 | Qualified | | | | | | | | 3 | 3 | 0 | 0 | 20 | 0 | +20 |
| (China) 2028 | To be decided | | | | | | | | To be decided | | | | | | |
| Total: 3/11 | Quarter-finals | 7 | 2 | 0 | 5 | 14 | 21 | −7 | 30 | 16 | 3 | 11 | 80 | 53 | +27 |

AFC U-17 Women's Asian Cup History
| Year | Round | Score | Result |
|---|---|---|---|
| 2005 | Group Stage | India 4–6 Thailand | Loss |
| 2005 | Group Stage | India 0–7 South Korea | Loss |
| 2005 | Group Stage | India 6–0 Indonesia | Win |
| 2026 | Group Stage | India 0–2 Australia | Loss |
| 2026 | Group Stage | India 0–3 Japan | Loss |
| 2026 | Group Stage | India 4–0 Lebanon | Win |
| 2026 | Quarter-final | India 0–3 China | Loss |

=== SAFF U-15/U-16/U-17 Women's Championship ===
SAFF U-15/U-16/U-17 Women's Championship record
| Host/Year | Result | Pld | W | D* | L | GF | GA | GD |
|---|---|---|---|---|---|---|---|---|
| (Bangladesh) 2017 | Runners-up | 4 | 2 | 0 | 2 | 13 | 4 | +9 |
| (Bhutan) 2018 | Winners | 4 | 4 | 0 | 0 | 16 | 1 | +15 |
| (Bhutan) 2019 | Winners | 4 | 2 | 2 | 0 | 15 | 3 | +12 |
| (Bangladesh) 2023 | Third | 4 | 2 | 0 | 2 | 13 | 4 | +9 |
| (Nepal) 2024 | Runners-up | 4 | 2 | 1 | 1 | 19 | 4 | +15 |
| (Bhutan) 2025 | Winners | 6 | 5 | 0 | 1 | 30 | 4 | +26 |
| Total: 6/6 | Winners | 26 | 17 | 3 | 6 | 106 | 20 | +86 |

=== SAFF U-18/U-19/U-20 Women's Championship ===
Though the tournament is for U-20 age group, India fielded the U-17 team as a preparatory tournament for the 2026 AFC U-17 Women's Asian Cup. The U-17 team won this edition by defeating Bangladesh U-20 team by 4–0 in the final.

SAFF U-18/U-19/U-20 Women's Championship record
| Host/Year | Result | Pld | W | D* | L | GF | GA | GD | Ref. |
|---|---|---|---|---|---|---|---|---|---|
| (Nepal) 2026 | Winners | 4 | 3 | 0 | 1 | 13 | 2 | 11 | |
| Total: 1/1 | Winners | 4 | 3 | 0 | 1 | 13 | 2 | 11 | — |

== Overall competitive records ==
As of 11 October 2026 vs Malaysia (excluding friendlies & minor tournaments)

| Competition | Pld | W | D | L | GF | GA | GD | Win% |
|---|---|---|---|---|---|---|---|---|
| FIFA U-17 Women's World Cup | 3 | 0 | 0 | 3 | 0 | 16 | −16 | 0.00 |
| AFC U-17 Women's Asian Cup | 7 | 2 | 0 | 5 | 14 | 21 | −7 | 28.57 |
| AFC U-17 Women's Asian Cup Qualification | 30 | 16 | 3 | 11 | 80 | 53 | +27 | 53.33 |
| SAFF U-17 Women's Championship | 26 | 17 | 3 | 6 | 106 | 20 | +86 | 65.38 |
| SAFF U-20 Women's Championship | 4 | 3 | 0 | 1 | 13 | 2 | +11 | 75.00 |
| Total | 70 | 38 | 6 | 26 | 213 | 112 | +101 | 54.29 |

== Head-to-head record ==
As of 11 October 2026 vs Malaysia (excluding friendlies & minor tournaments)

The following table shows India's head-to-head record in the official tournaments of FIFA U-17 Women's World Cup, AFC U-17 Women's Asian Cup (including qualifiers) and SAFF U-17 Women's Championship.

Positive Record Neutral Record Negative Record

| Opponent | Pld | W | D | L | GF | GA | GD | Win % |
|---|---|---|---|---|---|---|---|---|
| Australia | 1 | 0 | 0 | 1 | 0 | 2 | −2 | 0.00 |
| Bangladesh | 11 | 3 | 3 | 5 | 11 | 15 | −4 | 27.27 |
| Bangladesh U20 | 2 | 1 | 0 | 1 | 4 | 2 | +2 | 50.00 |
| Bhutan | 7 | 7 | 0 | 0 | 43 | 1 | +42 | 100.00 |
| Bhutan U20 | 1 | 1 | 0 | 0 | 8 | 0 | +8 | 100.00 |
| Brazil | 1 | 0 | 0 | 1 | 0 | 5 | −5 | 0.00 |
| China | 2 | 0 | 0 | 2 | 0 | 4 | −4 | 0.00 |
| Chinese Taipei | 1 | 0 | 0 | 1 | 1 | 2 | −1 | 0.00 |
| Hong Kong | 1 | 1 | 0 | 0 | 6 | 1 | +5 | 100.00 |
| Indonesia | 1 | 1 | 0 | 0 | 6 | 0 | +6 | 100.00 |
| Iran | 4 | 1 | 0 | 3 | 3 | 6 | −3 | 25.00 |
| Iraq | 1 | 1 | 0 | 0 | 14 | 0 | +14 | 100.00 |
| Japan | 1 | 0 | 0 | 1 | 0 | 3 | −3 | 0.00 |
| Jordan | 2 | 1 | 0 | 1 | 6 | 6 | +0 | 50.00 |
| Kyrgyzstan | 2 | 2 | 0 | 0 | 3 | 1 | +2 | 100.00 |
| Laos | 1 | 0 | 1 | 0 | 1 | 1 | +0 | 0.00 |
| Lebanon | 1 | 1 | 0 | 0 | 4 | 0 | +4 | 100.00 |
| Malaysia | 2 | 2 | 0 | 0 | 9 | 1 | +8 | 100.00 |
| Mongolia | 1 | 0 | 0 | 1 | 1 | 2 | −1 | 0.00 |
| Morocco | 1 | 0 | 0 | 1 | 0 | 3 | −3 | 0.00 |
| Myanmar | 1 | 1 | 0 | 0 | 2 | 1 | +1 | 100.00 |
| Northern Mariana | 1 | 1 | 0 | 0 | 4 | 1 | +3 | 100.00 |
| Nepal | 7 | 7 | 0 | 0 | 42 | 3 | +39 | 100.00 |
| Nepal U20 | 1 | 1 | 0 | 0 | 1 | 0 | +1 | 100.00 |
| Pakistan | 1 | 1 | 0 | 0 | 0 | 4 | −4 | 100.00 |
| Philippines | 1 | 0 | 0 | 1 | 0 | 2 | −2 | 0.00 |
| Russia | 1 | 0 | 0 | 1 | 0 | 2 | −2 | 0.00 |
| South Korea | 3 | 0 | 0 | 3 | 0 | 22 | −22 | 0.00 |
| Sri Lanka | 2 | 1 | 1 | 0 | 13 | 1 | +12 | 50.00 |
| Syria | 1 | 1 | 0 | 0 | 2 | 0 | +2 | 100.00 |
| Thailand | 2 | 0 | 0 | 2 | 4 | 10 | −6 | 0.00 |
| United Arab Emirates | 1 | 1 | 0 | 0 | 12 | 0 | +12 | 100.00 |
| United States | 1 | 0 | 0 | 1 | 0 | 8 | −8 | 0.00 |
| Uzbekistan | 3 | 2 | 1 | 0 | 6 | 3 | +3 | 66.67 |
| Total | 70 | 38 | 6 | 26 | 213 | 112 | +101 | 54.29 |

== See also ==
- India women's national football team
- India women's national under-20 football team
- India national football team
- Indian Women's League
- Women's football in India
- Sport in India
- Football in India
