= Yu Jong-hyang =

North Korean women's football forward (born 2009)

Personal information
- Date of birth: 18 August 2009 (age 17)
- Place of birth: North Korea
- Height: 1.63 m (5 ft 4 in)
- Position: Forward

Youth career
- 2024–: Naegohyang Sports Club

International career^{‡}
Years	Team	Apps	(Gls)
2024	North Korea U15	4	(5)
2025–	North Korea U17	19	(31)
Medal record
Women's football
Representing North Korea
FIFA U-17 Women's World Cup
Winner	2025 Morocco
Third place	2026 Morocco
- ‡ National team caps and goals as of 7 November 2026

Yu Jong-hyang (Korean: 유정향; born 18 August 2009) is a North Korean footballer who plays as a forward for Naegohyang Sports Club. She won both the Golden Ball and the Golden Boot at the 2025 FIFA U-17 Women's World Cup after finishing as the tournament's top scorer with eight goals. She won the Silver Ball at the 2026 FIFA U-17 Women's World Cup.

== Early life ==
Yu Jong-hyang was born in North Korea on 18 August 2009. Her first documented international appearance came at the 2024 EAFF U-15 Women's Championship in Dalian, China, at a 2–2 draw against China on 16 August 2024.. On 20 August 2024, she scored her first goal at under-15 team against South Korea in a 3–0 victory..

At the end of the tournament, she scored 5 goals in four matches, one goal against South Korea, a brace against Chinese Taipei and Japan..

== International career ==
=== North Korea U17 ===
Yu was promoted to the under-17 side for the 2025 FIFA U-17 Women's World Cup in Morocco.

On 24 October 2025, she scored twice in a 5–0 group-stage win over the Netherlands. Four days later, on 28 October, she added two goals in a 6–1 round-of-16 victory over Morocco. She scored both goals in North Korea's semi-final win over Brazil on 5 November. Yu started in the final against the Netherlands on 8 November, which ended in a 3–0 win for North Korea, as the team secured its fourth under-17 world title.

Yu's eight goals earned her the Golden Boot, while coaches and media voted her the tournament's best player, awarding her the Golden Ball.

She was later included in the squad for the 2026 AFC U-17 Women's Asian Cup, scoring five goals in a group-stage match against Chinese Taipei.

== International statistics ==
=== North Korea U15 ===
No.	Date	Venue	Opponent	Score	Result	Competition
1.	20 August 2024	Dalian Football Youth Training Center, Dalian, China	South Korea	3–0	3–0	2024 EAFF U-15 Women's Championship
2.	23 August 2024	Dalian Football Youth Training Center, Dalian, China	Chinese Taipei	1–0	4–0	2024 EAFF U-15 Women's Championship
3.	23 August 2024	Dalian Football Youth Training Center, Dalian, China	Chinese Taipei	3–0	4–0	2024 EAFF U-15 Women's Championship
4.	25 August 2024	Dalian Football Youth Training Center, Dalian, China	Japan	1–0	2–0	2024 EAFF U-15 Women's Championship
5.	25 August 2024	Dalian Football Youth Training Center, Dalian, China	Japan	2–0	2–0	2024 EAFF U-15 Women's Championship

=== North Korea U17 ===
No.	Date	Venue	Opponent	Score	Result	Competition
1.	18 October 2025	Mohammed VI Football Academy, Salé, Morocco	Mexico	1–0	2–0	2025 FIFA U-17 Women's World Cup
2.	24 October 2025	Mohammed VI Football Academy, Salé, Morocco	Netherlands	3–0	5–0	2025 FIFA U-17 Women's World Cup
3.	24 October 2025	Mohammed VI Football Academy, Salé, Morocco	Netherlands	5–0	5–0	2025 FIFA U-17 Women's World Cup
4.	28 October 2025	Rabat Olympic Stadium, Rabat, Morocco	Morocco	1–0	6–1	2025 FIFA U-17 Women's World Cup
5.	28 October 2025	Rabat Olympic Stadium, Rabat, Morocco	Morocco	6–0	6–1	2025 FIFA U-17 Women's World Cup
6.	1 November 2025	Rabat Olympic Stadium, Rabat, Morocco	Japan	3–1	5–1	2025 FIFA U-17 Women's World Cup
7.	5 November 2025	Rabat Olympic Stadium, Rabat, Morocco	Brazil	1–0	2–0	2025 FIFA U-17 Women's World Cup
8.	5 November 2025	Rabat Olympic Stadium, Rabat, Morocco	Brazil	2–0	2–0	2025 FIFA U-17 Women's World Cup
9.	2 May 2026	Suzhou Taihu Football Sports Centre, Suzhou, China	Chinese Taipei	3–0	10–0	2026 AFC U-17 Women's Asian Cup
10.	2 May 2026	Suzhou Taihu Football Sports Centre, Suzhou, China	Chinese Taipei	4–0	10–0	2026 AFC U-17 Women's Asian Cup
11.	2 May 2026	Suzhou Taihu Football Sports Centre, Suzhou, China	Chinese Taipei	7–0	10–0	2026 AFC U-17 Women's Asian Cup
12.	2 May 2026	Suzhou Taihu Football Sports Centre, Suzhou, China	Chinese Taipei	8–0	10–0	2026 AFC U-17 Women's Asian Cup
13.	2 May 2026	Suzhou Taihu Football Sports Centre, Suzhou, China	Chinese Taipei	10–0	10–0	2026 AFC U-17 Women's Asian Cup
14.	5 May 2026	Suzhou Taihu Football Sports Centre, Suzhou, China	Philippines	5–0	8–0	2026 AFC U-17 Women's Asian Cup
15.	11 May 2026	Suzhou Taihu Football Sports Centre, Suzhou, China	Thailand	1–0	6–0	2026 AFC U-17 Women's Asian Cup
16.	11 May 2026	Suzhou Taihu Football Sports Centre, Suzhou, China	Thailand	2–0	6–0	2026 AFC U-17 Women's Asian Cup
17.	14 May 2026	Suzhou Sports Center, Suzhou, China	China	1–0	4–2	2026 AFC U-17 Women's Asian Cup
18.	14 May 2026	Suzhou Sports Center, Suzhou, China	China	3–2	4–2	2026 AFC U-17 Women's Asian Cup
19.	14 May 2026	Suzhou Sports Center, Suzhou, China	China	4–2	4–2	2026 AFC U-17 Women's Asian Cup
20.	17 May 2026	Suzhou Sports Center, Suzhou, China	Japan	1–0	5–1	2026 AFC U-17 Women's Asian Cup
21.	17 May 2026	Suzhou Sports Center, Suzhou, China	Japan	2–0	5–1	2026 AFC U-17 Women's Asian Cup
22.	17 May 2026	Suzhou Sports Center, Suzhou, China	Japan	4–1	5–1	2026 AFC U-17 Women's Asian Cup
23.	17 May 2026	Suzhou Sports Center, Suzhou, China	Japan	5–1	5–1	2026 AFC U-17 Women's Asian Cup
24.	17 October 2026	Mohammed VI Football Academy, Salé, Morocco	Puerto Rico	1–0	6–0	2026 FIFA U-17 Women's World Cup
25.	17 October 2026	Mohammed VI Football Academy, Salé, Morocco	Puerto Rico	4–0	6–0	2026 FIFA U-17 Women's World Cup
26.	20 October 2026	Mohammed VI Football Academy, Salé, Morocco	Poland	2–0	6–1	2026 FIFA U-17 Women's World Cup
27.	20 October 2026	Mohammed VI Football Academy, Salé, Morocco	Poland	5–1	6–1	2026 FIFA U-17 Women's World Cup
28.	23 October 2026	Mohammed VI Football Academy, Salé, Morocco	Nigeria	1–3	1–3	2026 FIFA U-17 Women's World Cup
29.	28 October 2026	Mohammed VI Football Academy, Salé, Morocco	Morocco	1–0	6–0	2026 FIFA U-17 Women's World Cup
30.	28 October 2026	Mohammed VI Football Academy, Salé, Morocco	Morocco	4–0	6–0	2026 FIFA U-17 Women's World Cup
31.	7 November 2026	Mohammed VI Football Academy, Salé, Morocco	Brazil	5–0	6–0	2026 FIFA U-17 Women's World Cup

== Honours ==
North Korea U17

- FIFA U-17 Women's World Cup: 2025; third place: 2026
- AFC U-17 Women's Asian Cup: 2026

Individual

- FIFA U-17 Women's World Cup Golden Ball: 2025
- FIFA U-17 Women's World Cup Silver Ball: 2026
- FIFA U-17 Women's World Cup Golden Boot: 2025
- FIFA U-17 Women's World Cup Silver Boot: 2026
- AFC U-17 Women's Asian Cup Golden Boot: 2026
- AFC U-17 Women's Asian Cup Most Valuable Player: 2026
