= South Korea women's national under-17 football team =

Korea Republic Women's U-17
- Nickname(s): Taegeuk Sonyeo (Taegeuk Girls)
- Association: Korea Football Association
- Confederation: AFC (Asia)
- Sub-confederation: EAFF (East Asia)
- Head coach: Kim Eun-jung
- FIFA code: KOR
First colours	Second colours

AFC U-17 Women's Asian Cup
- Appearances: 10 (first in 2005)
- Best result: Champions (2009)

FIFA U-17 Women's World Cup
- Appearances: 5 (first in 2008)
- Best result: Champions (2010)

The South Korea women's national under-17 football team (recognized as Korea Republic by FIFA) represents South Korea in women's international youth football competitions.

== Results and fixtures ==
Win Draw Lose Fixture

== Coaching staff ==
Current coaching staff
Position	Name
Manager	(South Korea) Kim Eun-jung
Coach	(South Korea) Lee Da-yeong
Goalkeeping coach	(South Korea) Hwang Hee-hoon

== Players ==
=== Current squad ===
The following players were named for the 2024 AFC U-17 Women's Asian Cup.

No.	Pos.	Player	Date of birth (age)	Club
1	GK	Woo Su-min	18 May 2007 (aged 16)	(Korea Football Association) Pohang Girls' Electronic High School
2	DF	Shin Da-in	1 May 2007 (aged 17)	(Korea Football Association) Ulsan Hyundai High School
3	DF	Ryoo Ji-hae	22 February 2008 (aged 16)	(Korea Football Association) Ulsan Hyundai High School
4	DF	Sin Seong-hui	27 June 2007 (aged 16)	(Korea Football Association) Ulsan Hyundai High School
5	DF	Lee Ha-eun	1 October 2007 (aged 16)	(Korea Football Association) Ulsan Hyundai High School
6	DF	Noh Si-eun	24 March 2007 (aged 17)	(Korea Football Association) Ulsan Hyundai High School
7	MF	Kim Ye-eun	25 April 2007 (aged 17)	(Korea Football Association) Ulsan Hyundai High School
8	MF	Beom Ye-joo	12 August 2007 (aged 16)	(Korea Football Association) Gwangyang Girls' High School
9	MF	Baek Ji-eun	16 February 2008 (aged 16)	(Korea Football Association) Ulsan Hyundai High School
10	FW	Won Ju-eun	9 March 2007 (aged 17)	(Korea Football Association) Ulsan Hyundai High School
11	MF	Seo Min-jeong	31 January 2007 (aged 17)	(Korea Football Association) Gyeongnam Robot High School
12	MF	Kwon Da-eun	5 September 2007 (aged 16)	(Korea Football Association) Ulsan Hyundai High School
13	MF	Kim Ji-hyo	25 December 2007 (aged 16)	(Korea Football Association) Gyeongnam Robot High School
14	FW	Kim Hyo-won	24 June 2007 (aged 16)	(Korea Football Association) Gwangyang Girls' High School
15	MF	Park Ju-ha	10 October 2007 (aged 16)	(Korea Football Association) Chungju Yesung Girls' High School
16	DF	Park Ji-yu	6 September 2007 (aged 16)	(Korea Football Association) Chungju Yesung Girls' High School
17	MF	Nam Sa-rang	30 October 2007 (aged 16)	(Korea Football Association) Ulsan Hyundai High School
18	GK	Lee Yeo-eun	18 June 2007 (aged 16)	(Korea Football Association) Hwacheon Information High School
19	FW	Casey Phair	29 June 2007 (aged 16)	(United States Soccer Federation) Angel City
20	DF	Ji Ae	1 May 2007 (aged 17)	(Korea Football Association) Hwacheon Information High School
21	GK	Kim Chae-bin	14 April 2008 (aged 16)	(Korea Football Association) Gwangyang Girls' High School
22	MF	Han Hee	21 August 2009 (aged 14)	(Korea Football Association) Ulsan Hyundai High School
23	FW	Jeong Ye-won	3 June 2008 (aged 15)	(Korea Football Association) Osan Information High School

== Competitive record ==
Champions Runners-up Third place

=== FIFA U-17 Women's World Cup ===
FIFA U-17 Women's World Cup record
Year	Round	Pld	W	D*	L	GF	GA	Squad
(New Zealand) 2008	Quarter-finals	4	2	0	2	8	7	Squad
(Trinidad and Tobago) 2010	Champions	6	4	1	1	18	14	Squad
(Azerbaijan) 2012	Did not qualify							
(Costa Rica) 2014	Did not qualify							
(Jordan) 2016	Did not qualify							
(Uruguay) 2018	Group stage	3	0	1	2	1	7	Squad
(India) 2022	Did not qualify							
(Dominican Republic) 2024	Group stage	3	0	1	2	1	11	Squad
(Morocco) 2025	Group stage	3	0	1	2	1	7	Squad
(Morocco) 2026	Did not qualify							
(Morocco) 2027	To be determined							
(Morocco) 2028	To be determined							
(Morocco) 2029	To be determined							
Total:5/13	1 title	19	6	4	9	29	46	-

* Draws include knockout matches decided by penalty shoot-out.

=== AFC U-17 Women's Asian Cup ===
AFC U-17 Women's Asian Cup record								Qualification record					
Year	Round	Pld	W	D*	L	GF	GA	Pld	W	D	L	GF	GA
(South Korea) 2005	Fourth place	5	3	0	2	26	8	Not held					
(Malaysia) 2007	Third place	4	1	1	2	6	9	Not held					
(Thailand) 2009	Champions	5	4	1	0	23	2	Directly qualified					
(China) 2011	Fourth place	5	2	1	2	7	7	Directly qualified					
(China) 2013	Group stage	2	0	2	0	2	2	Directly qualified					
(China) 2015	Group stage	3	1	1	1	8	4	3	3	0	0	15	0
(Thailand) 2017	Runners-up	5	2	2	1	13	5	4	4	0	0	38	0
(Thailand) 2019	Group stage	3	1	0	2	3	5	Directly qualified					
(Indonesia) 2024	Third place	5	2	1	2	15	12	5	5	0	0	51	2
(China) 2026	Quarter-finals	4	2	0	2	9	4	Directly qualified					
(China) 2027	Qualified							3	3	0	0	31	0
Total:11/11	1 title	41	18	9	14	112	58	15	15	0	0	135	2

* Draws include knockout matches decided by penalty shoot-out.

== Head-to-head record ==
The following table shows South Korea's head-to-head record in the FIFA U-17 Women's World Cup and AFC U-17 Women's Asian Cup.

=== In FIFA U-17 Women's World Cup ===
Opponent	Pld	W	D	L	GF	GA	GD	Win %
Brazil	1	1	0	0	2	1	+1	100.00
Canada	1	0	0	1	0	2	−2	0.00
Colombia	3	0	2	1	2	3	−1	0.00
England	1	1	0	0	3	0	+3	100.00
Germany	1	0	0	1	0	3	−3	0.00
Ivory Coast	1	0	1	0	1	1	+0	0.00
Japan	1	0	1	0	3	3	+0	0.00
Mexico	1	1	0	0	4	1	+3	100.00
Nigeria	2	1	0	1	7	7	+0	50.00
South Africa	1	1	0	0	3	1	+2	100.00
Spain	4	1	0	3	2	15	−13	25.00
United States	2	0	0	2	2	9	−7	0.00
Total	19	6	4	9	29	46	−17	31.58

=== In AFC U-17 Women's Asian Cup ===
Opponent	Pld	W	D	L	GF	GA	GD	Win %
Australia	2	2	0	0	7	1	+6	100.00
China	7	1	4	2	9	12	−3	14.29
Chinese Taipei	1	1	0	0	4	0	+4	100.00
India	1	1	0	0	7	0	+7	100.00
Indonesia	2	2	0	0	27	0	+27	100.00
Iran	1	1	0	0	5	0	+5	100.00
Japan	6	1	1	4	2	12	−10	16.67
Laos	1	1	0	0	7	0	+7	100.00
Myanmar	1	1	0	0	8	0	+8	100.00
North Korea	8	1	1	6	7	25	−18	12.50
Philippines	2	1	1	0	6	1	+5	50.00
Thailand	7	4	1	2	20	7	+13	57.14
Uzbekistan	1	0	1	0	0	0	+0	0.00
Vietnam	1	1	0	0	3	0	+3	100.00
Total	41	18	9	14	112	58	+54	43.90

== See also ==
- Football in South Korea
- South Korea women's national football team
- South Korea women's national under-20 football team
- South Korea national under-17 football team
