= 2026 AFC U-17 Women's Asian Cup =

2026年亞足聯U-17女子亞洲盃

Tournament details
- Host country: China
- City: Suzhou
- Dates: 1–17 May 2026
- Teams: 12 (from 1 confederation)
- Venues: 4 (in 1 host city)

Final positions
- Champions: North Korea (5th title)
- Runners-up: Japan

Tournament statistics
- Matches played: 25
- Goals scored: 110 (4.4 per match)
- Attendance: 19,265 (771 per match)
- Top scorer(s): (North Korea) Yu Jong-hyang (15 goals)
- Best player: (North Korea) Yu Jong-hyang
- Best goalkeeper: (North Korea) Kim Song-gyong
- Fair play award: North Korea

The 2026 AFC U-17 Women's Asian Cup was the 10th edition of the AFC U-17 Women's Asian Cup (including previous editions of the AFC U-17 Women's Championship and AFC U-16 Women's Championship), the annual international youth football championship organised by the Asian Football Confederation (AFC) for the women's under-17 national teams of Asia. It was the first of three consecutive U-17 Women's Asian Cups held in Suzhou, China, preceding the 2027 and 2028.

It was held in China between 1–17 May 2026. For the first time, there were twelve teams competing in the tournament and there would be no third place playoff.

The top four teams of the tournament qualified for the 2026 FIFA U-17 Women's World Cup in Morocco as the AFC representatives. North Korea were the defending champions, having won a record-equalling fourth title in 2024. They successfully retained the title, winning a record fifth trophy.

== Qualification ==
The host country and the top three teams of the previous tournament in 2024 qualified automatically, while the other eight teams were decided by qualification. There was one round of qualification matches, which was held between 13–17 October 2025.

=== Qualified teams ===
The following teams qualified for the tournament.

Team	Qualification method	Date of qualification	Appearance(s)			Previous best performance (Note: Bold text indicates they hosted that edition.)
Team	Qualification method	Date of qualification	Total	First	Last	Previous best performance
China	Hosts	14 April 2024	10th	2005	2024	Runners-up (2005)
North Korea	2024 champions	16 May 2024	9th	2007	2024	**Champions** (2007, 2015, 2017, 2024)
Japan	2024 runners-up	16 May 2024	10th	2005	2024	**Champions** (2005, 2011, 2013, 2019)
South Korea	2024 third place	19 May 2024	10th	2005	2024	**Champions** (2009)
Philippines	Group A winners	17 October 2025	2nd	2024		Group stage (2024)
Lebanon	Group B winners	17 October 2025	1st	Debut		
Myanmar	Group C winners	17 October 2025	2nd	2009		Group stage (2009)
Vietnam	Group D winners	17 October 2025	2nd	2019		Group stage (2019)
Australia	Group E winners	17 October 2025	8th	2007	2024	Fourth place (2009, 2019)
Thailand	Group F winners	17 October 2025	10th	2005	2024	Third place (2005)
India	Group G winners	17 October 2025	2nd	2005		Group stage (2005)
Chinese Taipei	Group H winners	17 October 2025	5th	2005	2015	Group stage (2005, 2009, 2013, 2015)

== Venues ==
The tournament was held in the following venues in Suzhou.

Suzhou		2026 AFC U-17 Women's Asian Cup is located in China
Gusu	Wuzhong	2026 AFC U-17 Women's Asian Cup is located in China
Suzhou Sports Centre Stadium	Suzhou Taihu Football Sports Centre (Pitch 1, 4, and 8)	2026 AFC U-17 Women's Asian Cup is located in China
Capacity: 35,000	Capacity: No information	2026 AFC U-17 Women's Asian Cup is located in China

== Draw ==
The draw took place in Kuala Lumpur, Malaysia on 12 February 2026 at 15:00 MST (UTC+8). The twelve teams were drawn into three groups of four teams. The teams were seeded according to a points system derived from their final rankings across the previous three editions, with the hosts China automatically seeded and assigned to Position A1 in the draw.

Pot 1	Pot 2	Pot 3	Pot 4
1. China (hosts); 2. North Korea; 3. Japan	4. South Korea; 5. Thailand; 6. Australia	7. Philippines; 8. Vietnam; 9. India	10. Chinese Taipei; 11. Myanmar; 12. Lebanon

== Match officials ==
The following referees and assistant referees were appointed for the tournament.

Referees

- (Bhutan) Om Choki
- (China) Yu Hong
- (Chinese Taipei) Wang Chieh
- (France) Maïka Vanderstichel
- (Jordan) Haneen Murad
- (Laos) Keomany Phengmeuangkhoun
- (Nepal) Anjana Rai
- (North Korea) Jon Sol-mi
- (South Korea) Park Se-jin
- (Syria) Alissar Baddour
- (Thailand) Sunita Thongthawin
- (United Arab Emirates) Khuloud Al-Zaabi
- (Uzbekistan) Roziyabonu Yusupova
- (Vietnam) Trần Thị Thanh

Assistant referees

- (Australia) Laura Moya
- (Bangladesh) Salma Akter Mone
- (China) Wen Lili
- (China) Wu Qiaoli
- (France) Mélissa Rossignol
- (India) Riiohlang Dhar
- (India) Debala Devi Elangbam
- (Japan) Saki Nakamoto
- (Jordan) Sabreen Alabadi
- (Laos) Phutsavan Chanthavong
- (Myanmar) Wint War Tun
- (Nepal) Merina Dhimal
- (North Korea) Hyon Un-mi
- (Saudi Arabia) Eman Al-Madany
- (South Korea) Lee Soo-bin
- (Syria) Roba Zarka

== Squads ==
Players born between 1 January 2009 and 31 December 2011 were eligible to compete in the tournament. Each team must register a squad of minimum 18 players and maximum 23 players, minimum three of whom must be goalkeepers (Regulations Articles 22.1 and 26.3).

== Group stage ==
The top two teams of each group and the two best third-placed teams qualified for the quarter-finals.

Tiebreakers

Teams were ranked according to points (3 points for a win, 1 point for a draw, 0 points for a loss), and should they tied on points, the following tiebreaking criteria were applied, in the order given, to determine the rankings (Regulations Article 7.3):

1. Points in head-to-head matches among tied teams;
2. Goal difference in head-to-head matches among tied teams;
3. Goals scored in head-to-head matches among tied teams;
4. Should more than two teams were tied, and after applying all head-to-head criteria above, a subset of teams were still tied, all head-to-head criteria above were reapplied exclusively to this subset of teams;
5. Goal difference in all group matches;
6. Goals scored in all group matches;
7. Penalty shoot-out if only two teams are tied and they meet in the last round of the group;
8. Disciplinary points (yellow card = 1 point, red card as a result of two yellow cards = 3 points, direct red card = 3 points, yellow card followed by direct red card = 4 points);
9. Drawing of lots.

All times are local, CST (UTC+8)

=== Group A ===
Pos	Team	Pld	W	D	L	GF	GA	GD	Pts	Qualification
1	China (H)	3	3	0	0	15	0	+15	9	Knockout stage
2	Vietnam	3	1	1	1	4	6	−2	4	Knockout stage
3	Thailand	3	1	1	1	3	8	−5	4	Knockout stage
4	Myanmar	3	0	0	3	1	9	−8	0	

Source: AFC
Rules for classification: Qualification tiebreakers
(H) Hosts
1 May 2026
15:30

Thailand	2–2	Vietnam
Murdoch 27'; Thidawan 37'	Report	Phan Thị Thu Phương 35'; Nguyễn Thị Thanh Lam 90+1'

Suzhou Taihu Football Sports Centre (Pitch 1), Suzhou
Attendance: 75
Referee: Wang Chieh (Chinese Taipei)
1 May 2026
19:30

China	6–0	Myanmar
Liu Yuxi 7'; Zheng Niman 30'; Huang Qinyi 40'; Wu Yichen 66'; Cheng Wandi 72' (pen.); Ju Zhitong 85'	Report

Suzhou Sports Centre Stadium, Suzhou
Attendance: 10,015
Referee: Jon Sol-mi (North Korea)

4 May 2026
15:30

Myanmar	0–1	Thailand
	Report	Murdoch 24'

Suzhou Taihu Football Sports Centre (Pitch 1), Suzhou
Attendance: 80
Referee: Haneen Murad (Jordan)
4 May 2026
19:30

Vietnam	0–3	China
	Report	Ju Zhitong 16', 32'; Cheng Wandi 49'

Suzhou Taihu Football Sports Centre (Pitch 1), Suzhou
Attendance: 344
Referee: Park Se-jin (South Korea)

7 May 2026
19:30

China	6–0	Thailand
Yang Lan 5'; Li Qixian 20', 54'; Cheng Wandi 23'; Huang Qinyi 59', 60'	Report

Suzhou Taihu Football Sports Centre (Pitch 1), Suzhou
Attendance: 252
Referee: Om Choki (Bhutan)
7 May 2026
19:30

Vietnam	2–1	Myanmar
Nguyễn Thị Linh Chi 18'; Nguyễn Thị Ngọc Ánh 55'	Report	Thaw Dar Hnin 66'

Suzhou Taihu Football Sports Centre (Pitch 8), Suzhou
Attendance: 57
Referee: Khuloud Al-Zaabi (United Arab Emirates)

=== Group B ===
Pos	Team	Pld	W	D	L	GF	GA	GD	Pts	Qualification
1	Japan	3	3	0	0	21	0	+21	9	Knockout stage
2	Australia	3	1	1	1	3	6	−3	4	Knockout stage
3	India	3	1	0	2	4	5	−1	3	Knockout stage
4	Lebanon	3	0	1	2	1	18	−17	1	

Source: AFC
Rules for classification: Qualification tiebreakers
2 May 2026
15:30

Japan	13–0	Lebanon
Kubota 3'; Frangieh 25' (o.g.); Higuchi 27', 34', 64'; Sumiya 28'; Ikeda 37'; Ito 42', 67'; Hanashiro 52', 60'; Ota 70'; Kurita 80'	Report

Suzhou Taihu Football Sports Centre (Pitch 4), Suzhou
Attendance: 100
Referee: Om Choki (Bhutan)
2 May 2026
19:30

Australia	2–0	India
Mouithys 25'; Basnett 59' (o.g.)	Report

Suzhou Taihu Football Sports Centre (Pitch 8), Suzhou
Attendance: 80
Referee: Maïka Vanderstichel (France)

5 May 2026
15:30

Lebanon	1–1	Australia
Karnib 59'	Report	Mouithys 30'

Suzhou Taihu Football Sports Centre (Pitch 8), Suzhou
Attendance: 157
Referee: Roziyabonu Yusupova (Uzbekistan)
5 May 2026
19:30

India	0–3	Japan
	Report	Hayashi 59'; Ikeda 76', 81'

Suzhou Taihu Football Sports Centre (Pitch 4), Suzhou
Attendance: 124
Referee: Trần Thị Thanh (Vietnam)

8 May 2026
15:30

Japan	5–0	Australia
Hanashiro 16', 22'; Tamamura 35'; Kurita 52'; Higuchi 73'	Report

Suzhou Taihu Football Sports Centre (Pitch 4), Suzhou
Attendance: 50
Referee: Yu Hong (China)
8 May 2026
15:30

India	4–0	Lebanon
Barman 7', 85'; Senjam 36'; Joya 72'	Report

Suzhou Taihu Football Sports Centre (Pitch 8), Suzhou
Attendance: 37
Referee: Sunita Thongthawin (Thailand)

=== Group C ===
Pos	Team	Pld	W	D	L	GF	GA	GD	Pts	Qualification
1	North Korea	3	3	0	0	21	0	+21	9	Knockout stage
2	South Korea	3	2	0	1	9	3	+6	6	Knockout stage
3	Philippines	3	0	1	2	0	13	−13	1	
4	Chinese Taipei	3	0	1	2	0	14	−14	1	

Source: AFC
Rules for classification: Qualification tiebreakers
2 May 2026
15:30

South Korea	5–0	Philippines
Baek Seo-yeong 6', 14', 34', 55'; Kim Hee-na 67'	Report

Suzhou Taihu Football Sports Centre (Pitch 8), Suzhou
Attendance: 25
Referee: Yu Hong (China)
2 May 2026
19:30

North Korea	10–0	Chinese Taipei
Kim Ju-gyong 5'; Kim Won-sim 7'; Yu Jong-hyang 8', 20', 68', 70', 90+4'; Ri Ye-rim 47'; Won Sol-gyong 62'; Kim Sol-song 82'	Report

Suzhou Taihu Football Sports Centre (Pitch 4), Suzhou
Attendance: 107
Referee: Anjana Rai (Nepal)

5 May 2026
15:30

Chinese Taipei	0–4	South Korea
	Report	Chen You-yu 36' (o.g.); Lim Ji-hye 38'; Kim Min-seo 82'; Kim Hee-na 83'

Suzhou Taihu Football Sports Centre (Pitch 4), Suzhou
Attendance: 87
Referee: Keomany Phengmeuangkhoun (Laos)
5 May 2026
19:30

Philippines	0–8	North Korea
	Report	Ri Ui-gyong 31'; Eh Chong-gum 45+1'; Kim Won-sim 55', 79'; Won Sol-gyong 60'; Yu Jong-hyang 68'; Ri Kyong-im 70'; Song Won-yong 85'

Suzhou Taihu Football Sports Centre (Pitch 8), Suzhou
Attendance: 30
Referee: Alissar Baddour (Syria)

8 May 2026
19:30

North Korea	3–0	South Korea
Eh Chong-gum 13'; Kim Won-sim 77', 82'	Report

Suzhou Taihu Football Sports Centre (Pitch 4), Suzhou
Attendance: 263
Referee: Maïka Vanderstichel (France)
8 May 2026
19:30

Philippines	0–0	Chinese Taipei
	Report

Suzhou Taihu Football Sports Centre (Pitch 8), Suzhou
Attendance: 117
Referee: Roziyabonu Yusupova (Uzbekistan)

=== Ranking of third-placed teams ===
Pos	Grp	Team	Pld	W	D	L	GF	GA	GD	Pts	Qualification
1	A	Thailand	3	1	1	1	3	8	−5	4	Knockout stage
2	B	India	3	1	0	2	4	5	−1	3	Knockout stage
3	C	Philippines	3	0	1	2	0	13	−13	1	

Source: AFC
Rules for classification: Qualification tiebreakers

== Knockout stage ==
In the knockout stage, extra time and a penalty shoot-out were used to decide the winners should necessary.

=== Bracket ===
Quarter-finals
11 May – Suzhou (SC)
China	3
India	0
11 May – Suzhou (Taihu)
North Korea	6
Thailand	0
11 May – Suzhou (Taihu)
Japan	1
South Korea	0
11 May – Suzhou (SC)
Vietnam	0
Australia	2

Semi-finals
14 May – Suzhou (SC)
China	2
North Korea	4
14 May – Suzhou (SC)
Japan	4
Australia	0

Final
17 May – Suzhou (SC)
North Korea	5
Japan	1

=== Quarter-finals ===
The winners qualified for the 2026 FIFA U-17 Women's World Cup.

11 May 2026
15:00

Japan	1–0	South Korea
Higuchi 74'	Report

Suzhou Taihu Football Sports Centre (Pitch 1), Suzhou
Attendance: 81
Referee: Yu Hong (China)

11 May 2026
15:00

Vietnam	0–2	Australia
	Report	Karaberis 28'; Hussein 31'

Suzhou Sports Centre Stadium, Suzhou
Attendance: 93
Referee: Jon Sol-mi (North Korea)

11 May 2026
19:30

China	3–0	India
Huang Qinyi 38'; Liu Yuxi 45+4' (pen.); Li Qixian 90'	Report

Suzhou Sports Centre Stadium, Suzhou
Attendance: 1,375
Referee: Park Se-jin (South Korea)

11 May 2026
19:30

North Korea	6–0	Thailand
Yu Jong-hyang 17', 20'; Arisa 45' (o.g.); Ri Kyong-im 47'; So Ye-rim 70', 81'	Report

Suzhou Taihu Football Sports Centre (Pitch 1), Suzhou
Attendance: 40
Referee: Alissar Baddour (Syria)

=== Semi-finals ===
14 May 2026
15:00

Japan	4–0	Australia
Bradshaw 3' (o.g.); Kurita 24', 38'; Ota 74'	Report

Suzhou Sports Centre Stadium, Suzhou
Attendance: 175
Referee: Trần Thị Thanh (Vietnam)

14 May 2026
19:30

China	2–4	North Korea
Liu Yuxi 43', 50'	Report	Yu Jong-hyang 28', 65', 75'; Ri Kyong-im 33'

Suzhou Sports Centre Stadium, Suzhou
Attendance: 3,080
Referee: Haneen Murad (Jordan)

=== Final ===
17 May 2026
19:30

North Korea	5–1	Japan
Yu Jong-hyang 30', 50', 81', 89'; Kim Won-sim 55'	Report	Hayashi 53'

Suzhou Sports Centre Stadium, Suzhou
Attendance: 2,421
Referee: Alissar Baddour (Syria)

== Goalscorers ==
There were 110 goals scored in 25 matches, for an average of 4.4 goals per match.

15 goals

- (North Korea) Yu Jong-hyang

6 goals

- (North Korea) Kim Won-sim

5 goals

- (Japan) Rara Higuchi

4 goals

- (China) Huang Qinyi
- (China) Liu Yuxi
- (Japan) Mei Hanashiro
- (Japan) Nanami Kurita
- (South Korea) Baek Seo-yeong

3 goals

- (China) Cheng Wandi
- (China) Ju Zhitong
- (China) Li Qixian
- (Japan) Yuzuha Ikeda
- (North Korea) Ri Kyong-im

2 goals

- (Australia) Theodora Mouithys
- (India) Pritika Barman
- (Japan) Yumi Hayashi
- (Japan) Anri Ito
- (Japan) Arisu Ota
- (North Korea) Eh Chong-gum
- (North Korea) So Ye-rim
- (North Korea) Won Sol-gyong
- (South Korea) Kim Hee-na
- (Thailand) Miricah Murdoch

1 goal

- (Australia) Leyla Hussein
- (Australia) Frideriki Karaberis
- (China) Wu Yichen
- (China) Yang Lan
- (China) Zheng Niman
- (India) Joya
- (India) Alva Devi Senjam
- (Japan) Maho Kubota
- (Japan) Runa Sumiya
- (Japan) Mino Tamamura
- (Lebanon) Sara Karnib
- (Myanmar) Thaw Dar Hnin
- (North Korea) Kim Ju-gyong
- (North Korea) Kim Sol-song
- (North Korea) Ri Ui-gyong
- (North Korea) Ri Ye-rim
- (North Korea) Song Won-yong
- (South Korea) Kim Min-seo
- (South Korea) Lim Ji-hye
- (Thailand) Thidawan Wangchin
- (Vietnam) Nguyễn Thị Linh Chi
- (Vietnam) Nguyễn Thị Ngọc Ánh
- (Vietnam) Nguyễn Thị Thanh Lam
- (Vietnam) Phan Thị Thu Phương

1 own goal

- (Australia) Charlotte Bradshaw (against Japan)
- (Chinese Taipei) Chen You-yu (against South Korea)
- (India) Abhista Basnett (against Australia)
- (Lebanon) Gia Frangieh (against Japan)
- (Thailand) Arisa Tamsakul (against North Korea)

== Qualified teams for FIFA U-17 Women's World Cup ==
The following four teams from AFC qualified for the 2026 FIFA U-17 Women's World Cup.

Team	Qualified on	Previous appearances in FIFA U-17 Women's World Cup^{1}
Japan	11 May 2026	9 (2008, 2010, 2012, **2014**, 2016, 2018, 2022, 2024, 2025)
Australia	11 May 2026	0 (debut)
China	11 May 2026	4 (2012, 2014, 2022, 2025)
North Korea	11 May 2026	8 (**2008**, 2010, 2012, 2014, **2016**, 2018, **2024**, **2025**)

^{1} Bold indicates champions for that year. Italic indicates hosts for that year.

== See also ==
- 2026 AFC U-20 Women's Asian Cup
- 2026 AFC U-17 Asian Cup
