= AFC U-17 Women's Asian Cup =

- Organiser(s): AFC
- Founded: 2005; 21 years ago
- Region: Asia
- Teams: 12
- Current champions: North Korea (5th title)
- Most championships: North Korea (5 titles)
- 2027 AFC U-17 Women's Asian Cup

The AFC U-17 Women's Asian Cup, founded as the AFC U-17 Women's Championship and later the AFC U-16 Women's Championship, before changing to its current name after the 2019 edition, is a biennial women's football tournament for youth teams organised by the Asian Football Confederation. It further serves as the qualifying competition for the FIFA U-17 Women's World Cup. The AFC agreed to the proposal for switching the tournament from under-16 to under-17 starting from 2022. Thus, the tournament was rebranded from the "AFC U-16 Women's Championship" to the "AFC U-17 Women's Asian Cup".

== Format ==
The tournament was first held in 2005 as an under-17 tournament. With only 11 teams entering in the inaugural year, there was no qualification held. In 2007 the tournament switched to the under-16 tournament, again eight teams entered the competition. In 2009 twelve teams entered and thus for a first time a qualifying round was held. The 2011 edition featured two qualification rounds. Here five seeded teams for the finals were joined by an additional 13 teams fighting for a final sixth spot.

From 2026 on, the tournament are held annually, as the FIFA U-17 Women's World Cup are also held annually. Additionally, the tournament would be expanded from 8 to 12 teams.

== Results ==
Tournament names

- 2005: AFC U-17 Women's Championship
- 2007–2019: AFC U-16 Women's Championship
- 2022–present: AFC U-17 Women's Asian Cup

Edition	Year	Hosts	Final			Third place match or losing semi-finalists^{1}		
Edition	Year	Hosts	Champions	Score	Runners-up	Third place	Score	Fourth place
1	2005	South Korea	Japan	1–1 (a.e.t.) (3–1 p)	China	Thailand	2–1	South Korea
2	2007	Malaysia	North Korea	3–0	Japan	South Korea	1–1 (a.e.t.) (4–2 p)	China
3	2009	Thailand	South Korea	4–0	North Korea	Japan	6–2	Australia
4	2011	China	Japan	round-robin	North Korea	China	round-robin	South Korea
5	2013	China	Japan	1–1 (6–5 p)	North Korea	China	2–2 (a.e.t.) (4–2 p)	Thailand
6	2015	China	North Korea	1–0	Japan	China	8–0	Thailand
7	2017	Thailand	North Korea	2–0	South Korea	Japan	1–0	China
8	2019	Thailand	Japan	2–1	North Korea	China	2–1	Australia
—	2022	Indonesia	Cancelled due to the COVID-19 pandemic					
9	2024	Indonesia	North Korea	1–0	Japan	South Korea	2–1	China
10	2026	China	North Korea	5–1	Japan	Australia and China		
11	2027	China						
12	2028	China						

Notes

- ^{1} No third-place match was played after 2024.

== Performances by nation ==
Nation	Title(s)	Runners-up	Third place	Fourth place	Semi-finals	Total
North Korea	5	4	–	–	–	9
Japan	4	4	2	–	–	10
South Korea	1	1	2	2	–	6
China	–	1	4	3	1	9
Thailand	–	–	1	2	–	3
Australia	–	–	–	2	1	3

== Awards ==
Tournament	Most Valuable Player	Top goalscorer(s)	Goals	Fair play award
2005	(Japan) Natsuko Hara	(Japan) Natsuko Hara	12	Not awarded
2007	(North Korea) Yun Hyon-hi	(North Korea) Yun Hyon-hi	7	Not awarded
2009	(South Korea) Kim Da-hye	(South Korea) Yeo Min-ji	10	Not awarded
2011	(Japan) Yui Narumiya	(North Korea) Ri Un-sim	9	Thailand
2013	(Japan) Hina Sugita	(Japan) Rikako Kobayashi	7	North Korea
2015	(North Korea) Ri Hae-yon	(China) Wang Yanwen	6	Japan
2017	(North Korea) Kim Kyong-rong	(North Korea) Kim Kyong-rong	9	Japan
2019	(Japan) Hanon Nishio	(Japan) Maika Hamano	5	North Korea
2024	(Japan) Miharu Shinjo	(North Korea) Jon Il-chong	6	Japan
2026	(North Korea) Yu Jong-hyang	(North Korea) Yu Jong-hyang	15	North Korea

== Comprehensive team results ==
Legend

- 1st – Champions
- 2nd – Runners-up
- 3rd – Third place
- 4th – Fourth place
- SF – Semi-finalists
- QF – Quarter-finals
- GS – Group stage
- • – Did not qualify
- × – Did not enter / Withdrew
- XX – Country did not exist or national team was inactive
- – Hosts
- q – Qualified for upcoming tournament

For each tournament, the flag of the host country and the number of teams in each finals tournament (in brackets) are shown.

Team	2005 (South Korea) (11)	2007 (Malaysia) (6)	2009 (Thailand) (8)	2011 (China) (6)	2013 (China) (12)	2015 (China) (8)	2017 (Thailand) (8)	2019 (Thailand) (8)	2024 (Indonesia) (8)	2026 (China) (12)	2027 (China) (12)	Total
Australia	× (Note: Australia was an OFC member in 2005.)	GS	4th	R1	GS	•	GS	4th	GS	SF	Q	9
Bahrain	×	×	×	×	GS	•	×	•	×	×	•	1
Bangladesh	GS	×	×	×	×	•	GS	GS	•	•	•	3
China	2nd	4th	GS	3rd	3rd	3rd	4th	3rd	4th	SF	Q	11
Chinese Taipei	GS	×	GS	•	GS	GS	•	•	•	GS	Q	6
Guam	GS	×	×	•	GS	×	•	•	•	•	•	2
Hong Kong	GS	×	×	×	•	•	•	•	•	•	•	1
India	GS	×	•	•	•	•	•	•	•	QF	Q	3
Indonesia	GS	×	×	×	×	×	×	•	GS	•	Q	3
Iran	×	×	×	•	GS	GS	•	•	•	•	×	2
Japan	1st	2nd	3rd	1st	1st	2nd	3rd	1st	2nd	2nd	Q	11
Jordan	×	×	×	•	GS	•	•	•	•	•	•	1
Laos	×	×	×	×	×	×	GS	•	×	×	•	1
Lebanon	×	×	×	×	×	×	×	•	•	GS	•	1
Myanmar	×	×	GS	•	•	•	•	•	•	GS	Q	3
North Korea	×	1st	2nd	2nd	2nd	1st	1st	2nd	1st	1st	Q	10
Philippines	×	×	•	•	•	•	•	•	GS	GS	Q	3
Singapore	GS	×	•	•	×	×	•	•	•	•	•	1
South Korea	4th	3rd	1st	4th	GS	GS	2nd	GS	3rd	QF	Q	11
Thailand	3rd	GS	GS	R1	4th	4th	GS	GS	GS	QF	Q	11
Uzbekistan	×	×	•	×	GS	GS	•	•	•	•	•	2
Vietnam	×	×	×	•	×	•	•	GS	•	QF	Q	3

== Summary (2005 ~ 2026) ==
Rank	Team	Part	M	W	D	L	GF	GA	GD	Points
1	Japan	10	49	37	5	7	247	27	+220	116
2	North Korea	9	44	37	3	4	181	23	+158	114
3	China	10	45	23	7	15	155	50	+105	76
4	South Korea	10	41	18	9	14	112	58	+54	63
5	Thailand	10	33	10	2	21	48	133	−85	32
6	Australia	8	30	9	4	17	51	67	−16	31
7	Chinese Taipei	5	13	2	1	10	9	76	−67	7
8	Philippines	2	6	1	2	3	7	21	-14	5
9	Uzbekistan	2	5	1	1	3	3	11	-8	4
10	Hong Kong	1	3	1	1	1	3	24	−21	4
11	Guam	2	5	1	1	3	1	39	−38	4
12	India	1	3	1	0	2	10	13	−3	3
13	Iran	2	5	1	0	4	2	22	−20	3
14	Bangladesh	3	9	0	1	8	6	55	−49	1
15	Jordan	1	2	0	0	2	1	8	−7	0
16	Vietnam	1	3	0	0	3	0	14	−14	0
17	Myanmar	1	3	0	0	3	2	19	−17	0
18	Laos	1	3	0	0	3	0	17	−17	0
19	Bahrain	1	2	0	0	2	0	25	−25	0
20	Singapore	1	3	0	0	3	0	34	−34	0
21	Indonesia	2	6	0	0	6	1	59	−58	0

== FIFA U-17 Women's World Cup results ==
Legend

- 1st – Champions
- 2nd – Runners-up
- 3rd – Third place
- 4th – Fourth place
- QF – Quarter-finals
- R16 – Round of 16
- GS – Group stage
- – Hosts
- q – Qualified for upcoming tournament

For each tournament, the flag of the host country and the number of teams in each finals tournament (in brackets) are shown.

Team	2008 (New Zealand) (16)	2010 (Trinidad and Tobago) (16)	2012 (Azerbaijan) (16)	2014 (Costa Rica) (16)	2016 (Jordan) (16)	2018 (Uruguay) (16)	2022 (India) (16)	2024 (Dominican Republic) (16)	2025 (Morocco) (24)	2026 (Morocco) (24)	Total
Australia										GS	1
China			GS	GS			GS		R16	QF	5
India							GS				1
Japan	QF	2nd	QF	1st	2nd	QF	QF	QF	QF	2nd	10
Jordan					GS						1
North Korea	1st	4th	2nd	GS	1st	QF		1st	1st	3rd	9
South Korea	QF	1st				GS		GS	GS		5

== See also ==
- AFC U-20 Women's Asian Cup
- AFC U-17 Asian Cup
- FIFA U-17 Women's World Cup
