= Japan women's national under-17 football team =

Japan Women's U-17
- Nickname: Little Nadeshiko (リトルなでしこ)
- Association: JFA
- Confederation: AFC
- Sub-confederation: EAFF
- Head coach: Sadayoshi Shirai
First colours	Second colours

AFC U-17 Women's Asian Cup
- Appearances: 10 (first in 2005)
- Best result: Champions (2005, 2011, 2013, 2019)

FIFA U-17 Women's World Cup
- Appearances: 10 (first in 2008)
- Best result: Champions (2014)

The Japan women's national under-17 football team is a national association football youth team of Japan and is controlled by the Japan Football Association. It has reached the World Cup Finals on three times and won the 2014 edition.

== Results and fixtures ==
Legend

Win Draw Lose Fixture

== Coaching staff ==
=== Current coaching staff ===
As of 12 April 2024

Role	Name
Head coach	(Japan) Sadayoshi Shirai
Assistant coach	(Japan) Yuiko Konno
Goalkeeping coach	(Japan) Masaki Ijima
Physical coach	(Japan) Hiroshi Yamada
Technical staff	(Japan) Takumi Sakata

== Players ==
=== Current U-17 squad ===
The following players were called-up for the 2024 AFC U-17 Women's Asian Cup, held in May 2024.

No.	Pos.	Player	Date of birth (age)	Club
1	GK	Airi Nagai	9 June 2007 (age 19)	(Japan Football Association) Tokyo Verdy
2	DF	Yuna Aoki	7 July 2008 (age 18)	(Japan Football Association) Tokyo Verdy
3	DF	Yuka Makiguchi	16 July 2007 (age 19)	(Japan Football Association) Cerezo Osaka Yanmar
4	DF	Mitsuki Ota	20 January 2007 (age 19)	(Japan Football Association) Daisho Gakuen High School
5	MF	Manaka Sakaki	10 October 2007 (age 19)	(Japan Football Association) JFA Academy Fukushima
6	DF	Haruko Suzuki	11 January 2007 (age 19)	(Japan Football Association) Tokyo Verdy
7	MF	Hana Kikuchi	6 September 2007 (age 19)	(Japan Football Association) MyNavi Sendai
8	FW	Hinako Kinoshita	5 January 2007 (age 19)	(Japan Football Association) Cerezo Osaka Yanmar
9	FW	Momo Saruang Ueki Sato	27 July 2007 (age 19)	(Japan Football Association) Daisho Gakuen High School
10	MF	Asako Furuta	23 April 2007 (age 19)	(Japan Football Association) Cerezo Osaka Yanmar
11	FW	Ririka Nezu	10 July 2007 (age 19)	(Japan Football Association) JEF United Chiba
12	FW	Anon Tsuda	8 November 2007 (age 19)	(Japan Football Association) MyNavi Sendai
13	DF	Chihiro Sugawara	25 February 2007 (age 19)	(Japan Football Association) MyNavi Sendai
14	MF	Miharu Shinjo	5 February 2007 (age 19)	(Japan Football Association) Tokyo Verdy
15	MF	Momoka Honda	12 June 2007 (age 19)	(Japan Football Association) Jumonji High School
16	MF	Noa Fukushima	12 December 2008 (age 17)	(Japan Football Association) JFA Academy Fukushima
17	DF	Tamami Aso	26 October 2007 (age 19)	(Japan Football Association) Tokyo Verdy
18	GK	Korin Sakata	19 April 2007 (age 19)	(Japan Football Association) Kaishu Gakuen JSC
19	FW	Amiru Tsuji	8 September 2007 (age 19)	(Japan Football Association) Urawa Red Diamonds
20	FW	Mei Hanashiro	23 June 2009 (age 17)	(Japan Football Association) JFA Academy Fukushima
21	GK	Mao Fukuda	24 June 2007 (age 19)	(Japan Football Association) JFA Academy Fukushima
22	MF	Hina Hirakawa	6 October 2008 (age 18)	(Japan Football Association) Urawa Red Diamonds
23	FW	Meiko Matsuura	23 June 2007 (age 19)	(Japan Football Association) Tokoha University Tachibana High School

=== Previous U-17 squads ===
- 2022 FIFA U-17 Women's World Cup
- 2018 FIFA U-17 Women's World Cup
- 2016 FIFA U-17 Women's World Cup
- 2014 FIFA U-17 Women's World Cup
- 2012 FIFA U-17 Women's World Cup
- 2010 FIFA U-17 Women's World Cup
- 2008 FIFA U-17 Women's World Cup

== Competitive record ==
=== FIFA U-17 Women's World Cup ===
Year	Result	Pld	W	D*	L	GF	GA	Squad
(New Zealand) 2008	Quarter-finals	4	3	1	0	19	7	Squad
(Trinidad and Tobago) 2010	Runners-up	6	4	1	1	20	9	Squad
(Azerbaijan) 2012	Quarter-finals	4	3	0	1	17	1	Squad
(Costa Rica) 2014	Champions	6	6	0	0	23	1	Squad
(Jordan) 2016	Runners-up	6	5	1	0	19	2	Squad
(Uruguay) 2018	Quarter-finals	4	1	3	0	8	2	Squad
(India) 2022	Quarter-finals	4	3	0	1	11	2	Squad
(Dominican Republic) 2024	Quarter-finals	4	2	2	0	8	4	Squad
(Morocco) 2025	Quarter-finals	5	3	1	1	11	6	Squad
(Morocco) 2026	Runners-up	7	5	1	1	15	4	Squad
(Morocco) 2027	To be determined							
(Morocco) 2028	To be determined							
(Morocco) 2029	To be determined							
Total:10/13	1 Title	50	35	10	5	151	38	–

* Draws include knockout matches decided by penalty shoot-out.

=== AFC U-17 Women's Asian Cup ===
Year	Result	Pld	W	D*	L	GF	GA	GD
(South Korea) 2005	Champions	5	4	1	0	69	1	+68
(Malaysia) 2007	Runners-up	4	2	0	2	5	6	–1
(Thailand) 2009	Third place	5	3	0	2	26	7	+19
(China) 2011	Champions	5	5	0	0	18	0	+18
(China) 2013	Champions	4	3	1	0	35	1	+34
(China) 2015	Runners-up	5	3	1	1	19	2	+17
(Thailand) 2017	Third place	5	4	1	0	12	2	+10
(Thailand) 2019	Champions	5	4	1	0	21	1	+20
(Indonesia) 2024	Runners-up	5	4	0	1	15	2	+13
(China) 2026	Runners-up	6	5	0	1	27	5	+22
(China) 2027	Qualified							
(China) 2028	To be determined							
Total:11/12	4 Titles	49	37	5	7	247	27	+220

* Draws include knockout matches decided by penalty shoot-out.

== Head-to-head record ==
The following table shows Japan's head-to-head record in the FIFA U-17 Women's World Cup and AFC U-17 Women's Asian Cup.

=== In FIFA U-17 Women's World Cup ===
Opponent	Pld	W	D	L	GF	GA	GD	Win %
Brazil	3	2	1	0	7	1	+6	66.67
Canada	1	1	0	0	4	0	+4	100.00
Colombia	1	1	0	0	4	0	+4	100.00
England	3	1	2	0	7	4	+3	33.33
France	3	3	0	0	11	1	+10	100.00
Ghana	3	2	0	1	6	1	+5	66.67
Kenya	1	1	0	0	3	1	+2	100.00
Mexico	3	2	1	0	12	1	+11	66.67
New Zealand	5	4	1	0	16	1	+15	80.00
Nigeria	1	0	0	1	1	2	−1	0.00
North Korea	4	1	2	1	4	7	−3	25.00
Paraguay	4	3	1	0	23	3	+20	75.00
Poland	1	0	1	0	0	0	+0	0.00
Republic of Ireland	1	1	0	0	2	1	+1	100.00
South Africa	1	1	0	0	6	0	+6	100.00
South Korea	1	0	1	0	3	3	+0	0.00
Spain	5	3	0	2	9	6	+3	60.00
Tanzania	1	1	0	0	4	0	+4	100.00
United States	2	2	0	0	6	4	+2	100.00
Venezuela	3	3	0	0	12	1	+11	100.00
Zambia	3	3	0	0	11	1	+10	100.00
Total	50	35	10	5	151	38	+113	70.00

=== In AFC U-17 Women's Asian Cup ===
Opponent	Pld	W	D	L	GF	GA	GD	Win %
Australia	8	6	1	1	26	6	+20	75.00
Bangladesh	3	3	0	0	36	0	+36	100.00
China	7	6	1	0	17	3	+14	85.71
Chinese Taipei	2	2	0	0	22	0	+22	100.00
Guam	2	2	0	0	37	0	+37	100.00
Hong Kong	1	1	0	0	22	0	+22	100.00
India	1	1	0	0	3	0	+3	100.00
Iran	1	1	0	0	9	0	+9	100.00
Lebanon	1	1	0	0	13	0	+13	100.00
North Korea	10	3	2	5	8	15	−7	30.00
South Korea	6	4	1	1	12	2	+10	66.67
Thailand	6	6	0	0	38	1	+37	100.00
Uzbekistan	1	1	0	0	4	0	+4	100.00
Total	49	37	5	7	247	27	+220	75.51

== See also ==
Women's

- International footballers
- National football team (Results)
- National under-20 football team
- National under-17 football team
- National futsal team

Men's

- International footballers
- National football team (Results (2020–present))
- National under-23 football team
- National under-20 football team
- National under-17 football team
- National futsal team
- National under-20 futsal team
- National beach soccer team
