= North Korea women's national under-17 football team =

Football team representing North Korea at U17 level

Korea DPR Women's U-17
- Association: DPR Korea Football Association
- Confederation: AFC (Asia)
- Sub-confederation: EAFF (East Asia)
- FIFA code: PRK
First colours	Second colours

First international
- Japan 0–1 North Korea (Petaling Jaya, Malaysia; 8 March 2007)

Biggest win
- North Korea 11–0 Gambia (Baku, Azerbaijan; 22 September 2012)

Biggest defeat
- North Korea 0–4 South Korea (Bangkok, Thailand; 15 November 2009)

FIFA U-17 Women's World Cup
- Appearances: 9 (first in 2008)
- Best result: Champions (2008, 2016, 2024, 2025)

AFC U-17 Women's Asian Cup
- Appearances: 10 (first in 2007)
- Best result: Champions (2007, 2015, 2017, 2024, 2026)

Democratic People's Republic of Korea women's national under-17 football team represents North Korea in international youth women football competitions. It has reached the World Cup on eight occasions and won a record of four titles in 2008, 2016, 2024, and 2025. They have also been the Asian Cup champions a joint-record of five times in 2007, 2015, 2017, 2024, and 2026.

== Competitive Records ==
=== FIFA U-17 Women's World Cup ===
Year	Result	Pld	W	D*	L	GF	GA
(New Zealand) 2008	Champions	6	4	2	0	12	5
(Trinidad and Tobago) 2010	Fourth place	6	3	0	3	8	6
(Azerbaijan) 2012	Runners-up	6	3	3	0	18	5
(Costa Rica) 2014	Group stage	3	1	1	1	5	6
(Jordan) 2016	Champions	6	4	2	0	12	4
(Uruguay) 2018	Quarter-finals	4	2	1	1	7	6
(India) 2022	Withdrew						
(Dominican Republic) 2024	Champions	6	5	1	0	14	2
(Morocco) 2025	Champions	7	7	0	0	25	3
(Morocco) 2026	Third place	7	5	1	1	29	5
(Morocco) 2027	To be determined						
(Morocco) 2028	To be determined						
(Morocco) 2029	To be determined						
Total:9/13	4 Titles	51	34	11	6	130	42

* Draws include knockout matches decided by penalty shoot-out.

=== AFC U-17 Women's Asian Cup ===
Year	Result	Pld	W	D*	L	GF	GA
(South Korea) 2005	Did not enter						
(Malaysia) 2007	Champions	4	4	0	0	15	2
(Thailand) 2009	Runners-up	5	3	1	1	18	9
(China) 2011	Runners-up	5	4	0	1	14	1
(China) 2013	Runners-up	4	3	1	0	20	2
(China) 2015	Champions	5	4	1	0	13	2
(Thailand) 2017	Champions	5	4	0	1	20	2
(Thailand) 2019	Runners-up	5	4	0	1	21	2
(Indonesia) 2024	Champions	5	5	0	0	24	0
(China) 2026	Champions	6	6	0	0	36	3
(China) 2027	Qualified						
(China) 2028	To be determined						
Total:10/12	5 Titles	44	37	3	4	181	23

* Draws include knockout matches decided by penalty shoot-out.

== Current squad ==
Squad for the 2025 FIFA U-17 Women's World Cup

No.	Pos.	Player	Date of birth (age)	Club
1	GK	Kim Song-gyong	19 March 2009 (aged 16)	(DPR Korea Football Association) April 25
2	DF	Yun Jin-a	13 March 2008 (aged 17)	(DPR Korea Football Association) Amnokgang
3	DF	Ri Jin-a	23 September 2008 (aged 17)	(DPR Korea Football Association) Sobaeksu
4	DF	Oh Jin-sim	15 February 2008 (aged 17)	(DPR Korea Football Association) April 25
5	DF	Kim Yon-a	7 February 2008 (aged 17)	(DPR Korea Football Association) Sobaeksu
6	MF	Pak Su-rim	10 January 2008 (aged 17)	(DPR Korea Football Association) April 25
7	MF	Ri Un-gyong	19 July 2009 (aged 16)	(DPR Korea Football Association) April 25
8	MF	Eh Chong-gum	21 January 2009 (aged 16)	(DPR Korea Football Association) Sobaeksu
9	MF	Ri Kyong-im	26 March 2009 (aged 16)	(DPR Korea Football Association) April 25
10	FW	Yu Jong-hyang	18 August 2009 (aged 16)	(DPR Korea Football Association) April 25
11	MF	Pak Rye-yong	20 April 2008 (aged 17)	(DPR Korea Football Association) Sobaeksu 25
12	DF	Ryu Jin-ju	22 April 2008 (aged 17)	(DPR Korea Football Association) Amnokgang
13	DF	Ri Hyo-yang	20 February 2009 (aged 16)	(DPR Korea Football Association) April 25
14	DF	Pak Kum-mi	20 September 2008 (aged 17)	(DPR Korea Football Association) April 25
15	FW	Kim Won-sim	13 May 2010 (aged 15)	(DPR Korea Football Association) Pyongyang International Football School
16	FW	Ri Ye-rim	26 December 2010 (aged 14)	(DPR Korea Football Association) Ryomyong
17	DF	Kim Su-rim	25 May 2008 (aged 17)	(DPR Korea Football Association) Amnokgang
18	GK	Kim Su-jin	4 May 2008 (aged 17)	(DPR Korea Football Association) Sobaeksu
19	FW	Kim Sun-nyp	22 January 2008 (aged 17)	(DPR Korea Football Association) April 25
20	MF	Paek So-hyang	1 January 2008 (aged 17)	(DPR Korea Football Association) Naegohyang
21	GK	Hong Ryu-mi	2 June 2009 (aged 16)	(DPR Korea Football Association) Sobaeksu

=== Previous squads ===
2008 FIFA U-17 Women's World Cup
2010 FIFA U-17 Women's World Cup
2012 FIFA U-17 Women's World Cup
2014 FIFA U-17 Women's World Cup
2016 FIFA U-17 Women's World Cup
2018 FIFA U-17 Women's World Cup

== Head-to-head record ==
The following table shows North Korea's head-to-head record in the FIFA U-17 Women's World Cup and AFC U-17 Women's Asian Cup.

=== In FIFA U-17 Women's World Cup ===
Opponent	Pld	W	D	L	GF	GA	GD	Win %
Brazil	3	3	0	0	9	0	+9	100.00
Cameroon	2	2	0	0	4	2	+2	100.00
Canada	2	1	1	0	3	2	+1	50.00
Chile	1	1	0	0	3	0	+3	100.00
Costa Rica	1	1	0	0	2	1	+1	100.00
Denmark	1	1	0	0	4	0	+4	100.00
England	3	2	1	0	9	4	+5	66.67
France	2	0	2	0	2	2	+0	0.00
Gambia	1	1	0	0	11	0	+11	100.00
Germany	5	3	1	1	9	9	+0	60.00
Ghana	3	1	1	1	3	4	−1	33.33
Japan	4	1	2	1	7	4	+3	25.00
Kenya	1	1	0	0	3	0	+3	100.00
Mexico	2	2	0	0	6	1	+5	100.00
Morocco	2	2	0	0	12	1	+11	100.00
Netherlands	2	2	0	0	8	0	+8	100.00
Nigeria	3	1	0	2	6	6	+0	33.33
Poland	2	2	0	0	7	1	+6	100.00
Puerto Rico	1	1	0	0	6	0	+6	100.00
Spain	3	0	2	1	2	3	−1	0.00
Trinidad and Tobago	1	1	0	0	1	0	+1	100.00
United States	5	4	1	0	10	2	+8	80.00
Venezuela	1	1	0	0	3	0	+3	100.00
Total	51	34	11	6	130	42	+88	66.67

=== In AFC U-17 Women's Asian Cup ===
Opponent	Pld	W	D	L	GF	GA	GD	Win %
Australia	4	4	0	0	15	3	+12	100.00
Bangladesh	1	1	0	0	9	0	+9	100.00
China	7	7	0	0	16	4	+12	100.00
Chinese Taipei	3	3	0	0	25	0	+25	100.00
Indonesia	1	1	0	0	9	0	+9	100.00
Japan	10	5	2	3	15	8	+7	50.00
Jordan	1	1	0	0	6	0	+6	100.00
Myanmar	1	1	0	0	7	0	+7	100.00
Philippines	2	2	0	0	14	0	+14	100.00
South Korea	8	6	1	1	25	7	+18	75.00
Thailand	4	4	0	0	26	1	+25	100.00
Uzbekistan	1	1	0	0	4	0	+4	100.00
Vietnam	1	1	0	0	10	0	+10	100.00
Total	44	37	3	4	181	23	+158	84.09

== Honours ==
FIFA U-17 Women's World Cup

- (gold) Champions: 2008, 2016, 2024, 2025
- (silver) Runners-up: 2012

AFC U-17 Women's Asian Cup

- (gold) Champions: 2007, 2015, 2017, 2024, 2026
- (silver) Runners-up: 2009, 2011, 2013, 2019

== See also ==
- North Korea women's national football team
- North Korea women's national under-20 football team
