= Suzhou Sports Center =

Sports venue in Suzhou, Jiangsu, China

Coordinates: 31.29654°N 120.573084°E

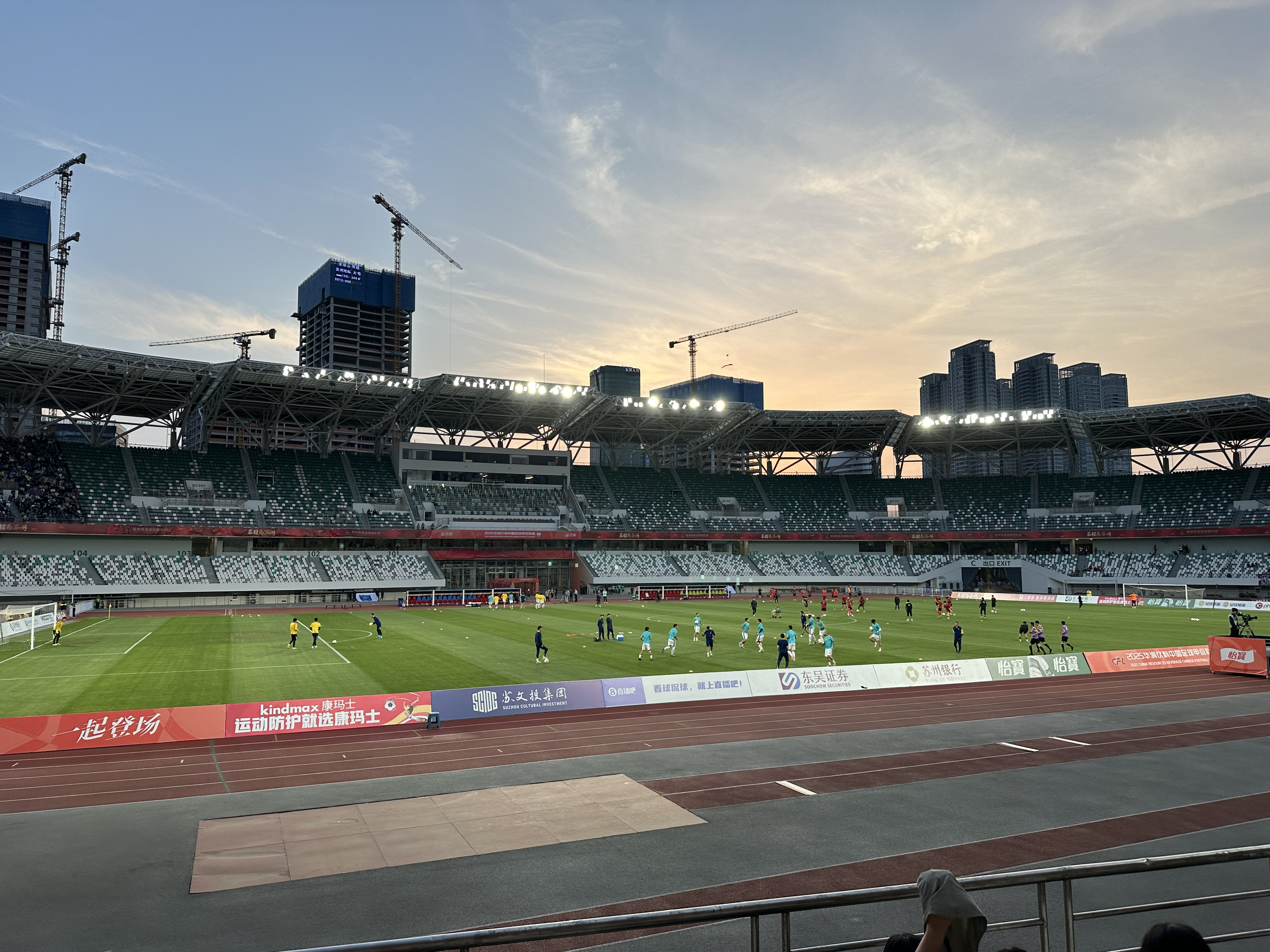
- Interactive map of Suzhou Sports Center
- Location: Suzhou, Jiangsu, China
- Owner: Suzhou Municipal Government
- Capacity: 35,000 (Stadium); 6,000 (Arena)
- Surface: Grass (Stadium); Hardwood (Arena)

Construction
- Opened: 2002

Tenants
- Suzhou Dongwu; Jiangsu Dragons; 2002 FIBA World Championship for Women; 2009 World Women's Handball Championship; 2026 AFC U-17 Women's Asian Cup

The Suzhou Sports Centre Stadium at the Suzhou Sports Centre (Chinese: 苏州市体育中心) is a multi-use sport stadium in Suzhou, Jiangsu, China. It is currently used mostly for soccer and basketball matches. The stadium holds 35,000 people. Association football club Suzhou Dongwu use the Suzhou Sports Centre Stadium for home games. The indoor Arena is used by Jiangsu Dragons, and sits roughly 6,000 people.
