= Chinese Taipei women's national under-17 football team =

National association football team

Chinese Taipei women's U-17
- Association: Chinese Taipei Football Association (Chinese: 中華民國足球協會)
- Confederation: AFC (Asia)
- Sub-confederation: EAFF (East Asia)
- Head coach: (Taiwan) Cheng Ya-hsun
- FIFA code: TPE
First colours	Second colours

First international
- Chinese Taipei 7–0 Singapore (Namhae, South Korea; 19 April 2005)

Biggest win
- Cambodia 0–12 Chinese Taipei (Vientiane, Laos; 5 October 2026)

Biggest defeat
- North Korea 10–0 Chinese Taipei (Suzhou, China; 2 May 2026)

FIFA U-17 World Cup
- Appearances: 0

AFC U-17 Asian Cup
- Appearances: 6 (first in 2005)
- Best result: Group stage (2005, 2009, 2013, 2015, 2026)

The Chinese Taipei women's national under-17 football team is the national women's youth team representing Taiwan in international football competitions at the under-17 age category. The team is controlled by the Chinese Taipei Football Association (CTFA).

Chinese Taipei has qualified for the AFC U-17 Women's Asian Cup 6th in its history, with their first appearance being in 2005.

== Coaching staff ==
Position	Name
Head coach	(Taiwan) Cheng Ya-hsun

== Players ==
=== Current squad ===
Squad for the 2026 AFC U-17 Women's Asian Cup as announced on 2 May 2026.

No.	Pos.	Player	Date of birth (age)	Caps	Goals	Club
1	GK	Lin Pin-yu	1 June 2009 (aged 16)			(Chinese Taipei Football Association) Hualien County Sports Senior High School
2	DF	Wu Yen-yu	3 April 2009 (aged 17)			(Chinese Taipei Football Association) Chung Shan School Foundation
3	DF	Yang Yu-qing	17 November 2009 (aged 16)			(Chinese Taipei Football Association) Hualien County Sports Senior High School
4	DF	Chen Ying-xuan	27 July 2009 (aged 16)			(Chinese Taipei Football Association) Hsing Wu Senior High School
5	DF	Chen Xin-yi	26 December 2009 (aged 16)			(Chinese Taipei Football Association) Yongqing Senior High School
6	DF	Lu Cai-xuan	11 September 2010 (aged 15)			(Chinese Taipei Football Association) Wuquan Junior High School
7	MF	Wang Yu-hsin	27 November 2009 (aged 16)			Unattached
8	MF	Hsiao Yu-chien	23 November 2010 (aged 15)			(Chinese Taipei Football Association) Ziqiang Junior High School
9	FW	Wu Cai-xuan	13 September 2009 (aged 16)			(United States Soccer Federation) James B. Conant High School
10	FW	Chung Yun-chien	15 July 2010 (aged 15)			(Chinese Taipei Football Association) Hualien County Sports Senior High School
11	FW	Chang Yu-hsin	15 February 2011 (aged 15)			(Chinese Taipei Football Association) Hsing Wu Senior High School
12	MF	Yang Yi-ai	3 September 2010 (aged 15)			(Chinese Taipei Football Association) Wuquan Junior High School
13	FW	Pan Ya-ni	27 February 2009 (aged 17)			(Chinese Taipei Football Association) Hualien County Sports Senior High School
14	FW	Hsiao Yu-hui	23 November 2010 (aged 15)			(Chinese Taipei Football Association) Ziqiang Junior High School
15	FW	Chen Pin-yen	9 October 2009 (aged 16)			(Chinese Taipei Football Association) Huiwen Senior High School
16	FW	Chen Jing-yun	9 May 2010 (aged 15)			(Chinese Taipei Football Association) Hualien County Sports Senior High School
17	MF	Lin Ya-cheng	13 October 2011 (aged 14)			(Chinese Taipei Football Association) Ziqiang Junior High School
18	GK	Lai Yi-jen	27 September 2009 (aged 16)			(Japan Football Association) Hyosung International High School
19	FW	Chen You-yu	22 December 2011 (aged 14)			(Chinese Taipei Football Association) Wuquan Junior High School
20	MF	Lin Zi-xuan	21 April 2009 (aged 17)			(Chinese Taipei Football Association) Hualien County Sports Senior High School
21	MF	Chuang Yung-hsin	27 September 2009 (aged 16)			(Chinese Taipei Football Association) Attaker
22	DF	Serena Ho	19 July 2011 (aged 14)			(Chinese Taipei Football Association) Taipei American School
23	GK	Peng Hsiang-chin	18 September 2009 (aged 16)			(Chinese Taipei Football Association) Hualien County Sports Senior High School

== Competitive record ==
=== FIFA U-17 World Cup ===
FIFA U-17 Women's World Cup record
Host/Year	Result	Position	Pld	W	D	L	GF	GA
(New Zealand) 2008	Did not qualify							
(Trinidad and Tobago) 2010	Did not qualify							
(Azerbaijan) 2012	Did not qualify							
(Costa Rica) 2014	Did not qualify							
(Jordan) 2016	Did not qualify							
(Uruguay) 2018	Did not qualify							
(India) 2022	Did not qualify							
(Dominican Republic) 2024	Did not qualify							
(Morocco) 2025	Did not qualify							
(Morocco) 2026	Did not qualify							
Total	–	0/10	0	0	0	0	0	0

=== AFC U-17 Asian Cup ===
AFC U-17 Women's Asian Cup record
Host/Year	Result	Pld	W	D*	L	GF	GA	GD
(South Korea) 2005	Group stage	2	1	0	1	7	7	0
(Malaysia) 2007	Did not participate							
(Thailand) 2009	Group stage	3	0	0	3	0	30	–30
(China) 2011	Did not qualify							
(China) 2013	Group stage	2	1	0	1	2	11	–9
(China) 2015	Group stage	3	0	0	3	0	14	–14
(Thailand) 2017	Did not qualify							
(Thailand) 2019	Did not qualify							
(Indonesia) 2022	Cancelled							
(Indonesia) 2024	Did not qualify							
(China) 2026	Group stage	3	0	1	2	0	14	–14
(China) 2027	Qualified							
Total: 5/11	Group stage	13	2	1	10	9	76	−67

== See also ==
- Chinese Taipei women's football team
- Chinese Taipei women's futsal team
- Chinese Taipei women's under-20 football team
