= 2009 AFC U-16 Women's Championship =

AFC U-16 Women's Championship

Tournament details
- Host country: Thailand
- Dates: 4–15 November
- Teams: 8 (from 1 confederation)
- Venue: 1 (in 1 host city)

Final positions
- Champions: South Korea (1st title)
- Runners-up: North Korea
- Third place: Japan
- Fourth place: Australia

The AFC U-16 Women's Championship 2009 was the 3rd instance of the AFC U-16 Women's Championship. It was held from 4 to 15 November 2009 in Bangkok, Thailand. The top 3 teams qualified for 2010 FIFA U-17 Women's World Cup.

== Venues ==
Bangkok
Suphachalasai National Stadium
Capacity: 35,000
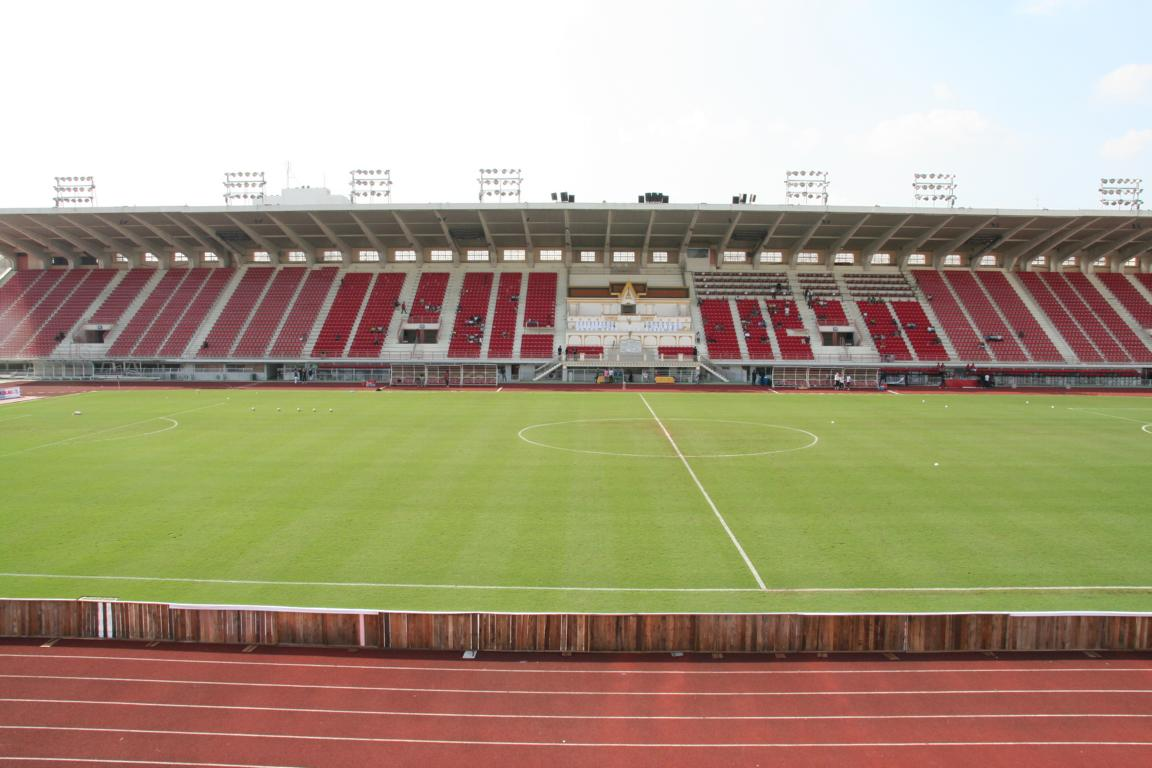

== Seeding ==
1. North Korea
2. Japan
3. South Korea
4. Australia
5. China
6. Chinese Taipei
7. Thailand
8. Myanmar

== Group stage ==
The draw for the AFC U-16 Women's Championship 2009 took place in Bangkok on February 27, 2009.

=== Group A ===
Team	Pts	Pld	W	D	L	GF	GA	GD
South Korea	7	3	2	1	0	18	2	+16
North Korea	7	3	2	1	0	14	2	+12
Thailand	3	3	1	0	2	4	15	−11
Myanmar	0	3	0	0	3	2	19	−17

4 November 2009

North Korea	5–0	Thailand

Supachalasai National Stadium, Bangkok

4 November 2009

South Korea	8–0	Myanmar

Supachalasai National Stadium, Bangkok

6 November 2009

Thailand	0–8	South Korea

Supachalasai National Stadium, Bangkok

6 November 2009

Myanmar	0–7	North Korea

Supachalasai National Stadium, Bangkok

8 November 2009

North Korea	2–2	South Korea

Supachalasai National Stadium, Bangkok

8 November 2009

Myanmar	2–4	Thailand

Supachalasai National Stadium, Bangkok

=== Group B ===
Team	Pts	Pld	W	D	L	GF	GA	GD
Australia	9	3	3	0	0	14	1	+13
Japan	6	3	2	0	1	20	4	+16
China	3	3	1	0	2	8	7	+1
Chinese Taipei	0	3	0	0	3	0	30	−30

5 November 2009

Japan	16–0	Chinese Taipei

Supachalasai National Stadium, Bangkok

5 November 2009

Australia	4–0	China
Andrews 18', 58', 63', 87'	Report

Supachalasai National Stadium, Bangkok

7 November 2009

Chinese Taipei	0–7	Australia
	Report	Stott 3'; Makrillos 5'; Brown 12'; Hatzirodos 19', 33'; Foord 42', 90'

Supachalasai National Stadium, Bangkok

7 November 2009

China	1–3	Japan

Supachalasai National Stadium, Bangkok

9 November 2009

Japan	1–3	Australia
Oda 7'	Report	Whitfield 13'; Allen 28'; Foord 45'

Supachalasai National Stadium, Bangkok

9 November 2009

China	7–0	Chinese Taipei

Supachalasai National Stadium, Bangkok

== Semi-finals ==
12 November 2009

South Korea	1–0	Japan

Supachalasai National Stadium, Bangkok

12 November 2009

Australia	3–4	North Korea
Whitfield 7'; Foord 27'; van Egmond 62'	Report	Kim Kum-jong 17', 77'; Pong Son-hwa 37'; Kim Yun-mi 85'

Supachalasai National Stadium, Bangkok

== Third-place play-off ==
15 November 2009

Japan	6–2	Australia
Kyokawa 31', 52', 69', 87'; Naomoto 45'; Takagi 83'	Report	Andrews 59'; Foord 85'

Supachalasai National Stadium, Bangkok

== Final ==
15 November 2009

South Korea	4–0	North Korea

Supachalasai National Stadium, Bangkok

2009 AFC U-16 Women's Championship

South Korea
First title

== See also ==
- 2009 AFC U-19 Women's Championship
