= China women's national under-17 football team =

China U-17
- Association: Chinese Football Association
- Confederation: AFC (Asia)
- Head coach: Wang Hongliang
- FIFA code: CHN
First colours	Second colours

FIFA U-17 Women's World Cup
- Appearances: 5 (first in 2012)
- Best result: Quarter-finals (2026)

The China women's national under-17 football team represents China in international football competitions such as in the FIFA U-17 Women's World Cup and the AFC U-17 Women's Asian Cup, as well as any other under-17 women's international football tournaments. It is governed by the Chinese Football Association.

== Fixtures and results ==
Legend

Win Draw Lose Fixture

== Coaching staff ==
Position	Name
Head coach	(China) Wang Hongliang
Assistant coach	(China) Yang Guang
Assistant coach	(China) Meng Yali
Goalkeeping coach	(China) Zhu Jianmin
Physical coach	(China) Sun Xiaoxuan
Fitness coach	(China) Zhu Ting
Fitness coach	(China) Jiang Ning
Technical analyst	(China) Feng Wei
Scientific research	(China) Sun Qi
Doctor	(China) Zhang Peng
Doctor	(China) Zhang Baoju
Doctor	(China) Juan Xie Rong
Doctor	(China) Song Yiheng
Equipment manager	(China) Zheng Cheng
Team manager	(China) Shan Liang

== Players ==
=== Current squad ===
Squad for the 2014 Summer Youth Olympics

- 1 Xu Huan
- 2 Zhang Jiayun
- 3 Chen Qiaozhu
- 4 Tu Linli
- 5 Xie Qiwen
- 6 Ma Xiaolan
- 7 Fang Jie
- 8 Chen Xia
- 9 Wang Yanwen
- 10 Zhao Yujie
- 11 Yan Yingying
- 12 Wan Wenting
- 13 Li Qingtong
- 14 Wu Xi
- 15 Zhan Ying
- 16 Tao Zhudan
- 17 Jin Kun
- 18 Zheng Jie

== Competitive record ==
=== FIFA U-17 Women's World Cup ===
Year	Result	Pld	W	D*	L	GS	GA	Squad
(New Zealand) 2008	Did not qualify							
(Trinidad and Tobago) 2010	Did not qualify							
(Azerbaijan) 2012	Group stage	3	1	1	1	5	3	Squad
(Costa Rica) 2014	Group stage	3	1	0	2	4	7	Squad
(Jordan) 2016	Did not qualify							
(Uruguay) 2018	Did not qualify							
(India) 2022	Group stage	3	1	0	2	2	4	Squad
(Dominican Republic) 2024	Did not qualify							
(Morocco) 2025	Round of 16	4	2	0	2	11	8	Squad
(Morocco) 2026	Quarter-finals	5	3	1	1	14	4	Squad
(Morocco) 2027	To be determined							
(Morocco) 2028	To be determined							
(Morocco) 2029	To be determined							
Total:5/13	Quarter-finals	18	8	2	8	36	26	–

* Draws include knockout matches decided via penalty shoot-out.

=== AFC U-17 Women's Asian Cup ===
Year	Result	GP	W	D*	L	GS	GA
(South Korea) 2005	Runners-up	4	3	1	0	41	1
(Malaysia) 2007	Fourth place	4	1	2	1	5	5
(Thailand) 2009	Group stage	3	1	0	2	8	7
(China) 2011	Third place	5	2	1	2	11	4
(China) 2013	Third place	4	2	1	1	22	5
(China) 2015	Third place	5	3	1	1	21	5
(Thailand) 2017	Fourth place	5	2	1	2	15	5
(Thailand) 2019	Third place	5	3	0	2	5	7
(Indonesia) 2024	Fourth place	5	2	0	3	7	7
(China) 2026	Semi-finals	5	4	0	1	20	4
(China) 2027	Qualified						
(China) 2028	Qualified						
Total	12/12	45	23	7	15	155	50

* Draws include knockout matches decided via penalty shoot-out.

=== Youth Olympic Games record ===
- 2010: Did not qualify
- 2014: Champions

== Head-to-head record ==
The following table shows China's head-to-head record in the FIFA U-17 Women's World Cup.

Opponent	Pld	W	D	L	GF	GA	GD	Win %
Brazil	2	0	0	2	1	5	−4	0.00
Colombia	2	1	0	1	3	3	+0	50.00
Ecuador	1	1	0	0	4	0	+4	100.00
France	1	0	1	0	0	0	+0	0.00
Germany	1	0	1	0	1	1	+0	0.00
Ghana	1	0	0	1	0	2	−2	0.00
Kenya	1	1	0	0	3	0	+3	100.00
Mexico	2	1	0	1	2	5	−3	50.00
Nigeria	1	0	0	1	1	2	−1	0.00
Norway	1	1	0	0	5	0	+5	100.00
Samoa	1	1	0	0	7	0	+7	100.00
Spain	1	0	0	1	0	1	−1	0.00
United States	2	1	0	1	5	7	−2	50.00
Uruguay	1	1	0	0	4	0	+4	100.00
Total	18	8	2	8	36	26	+10	44.44

== Honours ==
- Youth Olympic Games

Champions (1): 2014

- AFC U-16 Women's Championship

Runners-up (1): 2005
