= 2016 FIFA U-17 Women's World Cup =

كأس العالم للسيدات تحت 17 سنة 2016

Tournament details
- Host country: Jordan
- Dates: 30 September – 21 October
- Teams: 16 (from 6 confederations)
- Venues: 4 (in 3 host cities)

Final positions
- Champions: North Korea (2nd title)
- Runners-up: Japan
- Third place: Spain
- Fourth place: Venezuela

Tournament statistics
- Matches played: 32
- Goals scored: 104 (3.25 per match)
- Attendance: 104,095 (3,253 per match)
- Top scorer(s): (Spain) Lorena Navarro (8 goals)
- Best player: (Japan) Fuka Nagano
- Best goalkeeper: (Spain) Noelia Ramos
- Fair play award: Japan

The 2016 FIFA U-17 Women's World Cup was the fifth edition of the FIFA U-17 Women's World Cup, the biennial international women's youth football championship contested by the under-17 national teams of the member associations of FIFA. The tournament was held in Jordan from 30 September to 21 October 2016.

While the role of women in sport was regarded as controversial due to cultural and religious conservatism in some countries of the Middle East, this tournament was the first women's FIFA tournament held in the region.

== Host selection ==
The following countries submitted a bid to host the tournament by the May 2013 deadline:

- Bahrain
- Jordan
- Republic of Ireland
- South Africa

On 5 December 2013, the FIFA Executive Committee announced that the tournament would be held in Jordan.

== Qualified teams ==
A total of 16 teams qualified for the final tournament. In addition to Jordan who qualified automatically as hosts, the other 15 teams qualified from six separate continental competitions. The slot allocation was published in June 2014.

Confederation	Qualifying Tournament	Qualifier(s)
AFC (Asia)	Host nation	Jordan^{1}
AFC (Asia)	2015 AFC U-16 Women's Championship	Japan; North Korea
CAF (Africa)	2016 African U-17 Women's World Cup Qualifying Tournament	Cameroon^{1} Ghana; Nigeria
CONCACAF (North, Central America & Caribbean)	2016 CONCACAF Women's U-17 Championship	Canada; Mexico; United States
CONMEBOL (South America)	2016 South American Under-17 Women's Championship	Brazil; Paraguay; Venezuela
OFC (Oceania)	2016 OFC U-17 Women's Championship	New Zealand
UEFA (Europe)	2016 UEFA Women's Under-17 Championship	England; Germany; Spain

1.Teams that made their debut.

== Venues ==
The three host cities were Amman, Irbid, and Zarqa. The infrastructure of the stadiums and surrounding areas in the host cities was developed. Greater Amman Municipality and the Higher Council for Youth were responsible for developing the infrastructure, with 30% under the responsibility of the municipality and 70% under the responsibility of the council.

Amman	2016 FIFA U-17 Women's World Cup is located in Jordan	Amman
Amman International Stadium	2016 FIFA U-17 Women's World Cup is located in Jordan	King Abdullah II Stadium
Capacity: 23,000	2016 FIFA U-17 Women's World Cup is located in Jordan	Capacity: 18,000
Zarqa	2016 FIFA U-17 Women's World Cup is located in Jordan	Irbid
Prince Mohammed Stadium	2016 FIFA U-17 Women's World Cup is located in Jordan	Al-Hassan Stadium
Capacity: 17,000	2016 FIFA U-17 Women's World Cup is located in Jordan	Capacity: 15,000

== Emblem ==
The official emblem was unveiled on 3 May 2015, which was designed to showcase Jordan's most iconic symbols. Visual aspects of the Jordanian culture can be seen on the emblem that has the traditional shape of the FIFA U-17 Women's World Cup Trophy, which include; the distinctive pattern of the Jordanian Keffieh, the Jordanian national flower Black Iris, Pan Arab colors and a star from the Jordanian flag.

== Mascot ==
In a FIFA press conference on 28 May 2016, the tournament mascot, "Aseela", was introduced. Aseela is an Arabian oryx, which is a rare animal that happens to be the national animal of Jordan. The Arabian Oryx was chosen for being a symbol of " strength, gentleness, and athleticism", resembling female football players. The mascot is expected to inspire young women across Jordan and the region to participate in watching the tournament.

== Theme song ==
The official song for the 2016 FIFA Women U-17 World Cup was 'Jordan our Playground' Composed by Lebanese Singer Carole Samaha and her Jordanian counterpart Hussein Al Salman.

== Squads ==
Each team named a squad of 21 players (three of whom must be goalkeepers) by the FIFA deadline. All players must be born on or after 1 January 1999, and on or before 31 December 2001. The official squads were announced on 23 September 2016.

== Match officials ==
A total of 16 referees, 1 reserve referee, and 28 assistant referees were appointed by FIFA for the tournament.

Confederation	Referees	Assistant referees
AFC	(Australia) Kate Jacewicz (South Korea) Park Ji-yeong (Japan) Yoshimi Yamashita (South Korea) Oh Hyeon-jeong (reserve)	(Australia) Renae Coghill (India) Uvena Fernandes (Japan) Maiko Hagio (South Korea) Lee Seul-gi (China) Liang Jianping (Vietnam) Truong Thi Le Trinh
CAF	(Togo) Aissata Ameyo Amegee (Ethiopia) Ledya Tafesse	(Cameroon) Josiane Mbakop (Mali) Fanta Idrissa Kone
CONCACAF	(Canada) Marie-Soleil Beaudoin (United States) Katja Koroleva (El Salvador) Miriam Patricia León Serpas	(El Salvador) Thelma Beltran (Mexico) Yudilia Briones (Jamaica) Princess Brown (United States) Kathryn Nesbitt (United States) Deleana Quan (Jamaica) Stephanie-Dale Yee Sing
CONMEBOL	(Argentina) Laura Fortunato (Brazil) Regildenia de Holanda Moura (Colombia) Viviana Muñoz (Colombia) Yeimy Martinez	(Bolivia) Liliana Bejarano (Paraguay) Nilda Gamarra (Colombia) Luzmila Gonzalez (Argentina) Daiana Milone (Brazil) Tatiane Sacilotti (Chile) Leslie Vasquez
OFC	(Fiji) Finau Vulivuli	–
UEFA	(Malta) Esther Azzopardi (Portugal) Sandra Braz Bastos (Russia) Anastasia Pustovoitova (Czech Republic) Olga Zadinová	(Italy) Lucia Abruzzese (Ukraine) Oleksandra Ardasheva (Germany) Christina Biehl (Switzerland) Susanne Kueng (Russia) Ekaterina Kurochkina (Scotland) Kylie McMullan (Slovakia) Slavomira Majkuthová (Poland) Katarzyna Wojs

== Draw ==
The official draw was held on 30 May 2016, 18:00 EEST (UTC+3), at the Al Hussein Cultural Centre in Amman. The teams were seeded based on their performances in previous U-17 Women's World Cups and confederation tournaments, with the hosts Jordan automatically seeded and assigned to position A1. Teams of the same confederation could not meet in the group stage.

Pot 1	Pot 2	Pot 3	Pot 4
Jordan; Japan; Germany; North Korea	Nigeria; Spain; Venezuela; Ghana	Canada; United States; Mexico; Brazil	New Zealand; England; Paraguay; Cameroon

== Group stage ==
The match schedule was approved by the FIFA Executive Committee on 25 May 2015, and officially announced on 10 August 2015.

The top two teams of each group advance to the quarter-finals. The rankings of teams in each group are determined as follows:

1. points obtained in all group matches;
2. goal difference in all group matches;
3. number of goals scored in all group matches;

If two or more teams are equal on the basis of the above three criteria, their rankings are determined as follows:

4. points obtained in the group matches between the teams concerned;
5. goal difference in the group matches between the teams concerned;
6. number of goals scored in the group matches between the teams concerned;
7. fair play points
  - first yellow card: minus 1 point;
  - indirect red card (second yellow card): minus 3 points;
  - direct red card: minus 4 points;
  - yellow card and direct red card: minus 5 points;
8. drawing of lots by the FIFA Organising Committee.

All times are local, EEST (UTC+3).

=== Group A ===
Pos	Team	Pld	W	D	L	GF	GA	GD	Pts	Qualification
1	Mexico	3	2	1	0	10	2	+8	7	Knockout stage
2	Spain	3	2	1	0	9	1	+8	7	Knockout stage
3	New Zealand	3	1	0	2	5	7	−2	3	
4	Jordan (H)	3	0	0	3	1	15	−14	0	

Source: FIFA
(H) Hosts
30 September 2016
17:00

Mexico	5–0	New Zealand
Espinosa 18'; Ovalle 36'; López 68'; Ávalos 81'; Torres 87'	Report

Amman International Stadium, Amman
Attendance: 7,635
Referee: Yeimy Martinez (Colombia)
30 September 2016
20:00

Jordan	0–6	Spain
	Report	L. Navarro 6', 27', 42', 47' (pen.), 79'; Pina 89'

Amman International Stadium, Amman
Attendance: 14,347
Referee: Marie-Soleil Beaudoin (Canada)

3 October 2016
16:00

Spain	2–0	New Zealand
Aleixandri 80'; Pina 85'	Report

Al-Hassan Stadium, Irbid
Attendance: 698
Referee: Park Ji-Yeong (South Korea)
3 October 2016
19:00

Jordan	1–4	Mexico
Abu-Sabbah 6'	Report	Enrigue 13'; Cázares 17'; Ovalle 54'; Juárez 85'

Al-Hassan Stadium, Irbid
Attendance: 8,250
Referee: Finau Vulivuli (Fiji)

7 October 2016
16:00

New Zealand	5–0	Jordan
Tawharu 5', 90'; Blake 28', 76', 90+2'	Report

Prince Mohammed Stadium, Zarqa
Attendance: 4,493
Referee: Aissata Amegee (Togo)
7 October 2016
16:00

Spain	1–1	Mexico
E. Navarro 58'	Report	Espinosa 56'

King Abdullah Stadium, Amman
Attendance: 1,900
Referee: Ledya Tafesse (Ethiopia)

=== Group B ===
Pos	Team	Pld	W	D	L	GF	GA	GD	Pts	Qualification
1	Germany	3	2	1	0	5	2	+3	7	Knockout stage
2	Venezuela	3	2	0	1	5	3	+2	6	Knockout stage
3	Canada	3	1	1	1	4	5	−1	4	
4	Cameroon	3	0	0	3	3	7	−4	0	

Source: FIFA
30 September 2016
15:00

Venezuela	1–2	Germany
Cazorla 61'	Report	Gwinn 7'; Bühl 74'

Al-Hassan Stadium, Irbid
Attendance: 3,731
Referee: Kate Jacewicz (Australia)
30 September 2016
18:00

Cameroon	2–3	Canada
Djoubi 17'; Dabda 42'	Report	Huitema 3'; Stratigakis 78' (pen.); Taylor 83'

Al-Hassan Stadium, Irbid
Attendance: 4,200
Referee: Sandra Braz (Portugal)

3 October 2016
16:00

Venezuela	2–1	Cameroon
Castellanos 20', 90+4'	Report	Takounda 90+3'

Amman International Stadium, Amman
Attendance: 1,275
Referee: Yoshimi Yamashita (Japan)
3 October 2016
19:00

Germany	1–1	Canada
Gwinn 45+2'	Report	Rose 20'

Amman International Stadium, Amman
Attendance: 3,384
Referee: Regildenia Moura (Brazil)

7 October 2016
19:00

Canada	0–2	Venezuela
	Report	Castellanos 30'; Moreno 74'

King Abdullah Stadium, Amman
Attendance: 2,704
Referee: Olga Zadinová (Czech Republic)
7 October 2016
19:00

Germany	2–0	Cameroon
Gwinn 15'; Oberdorf 72'	Report

Prince Mohammed Stadium, Zarqa
Attendance: 1,130
Referee: Park Ji-Yeong (South Korea)

=== Group C ===
Pos	Team	Pld	W	D	L	GF	GA	GD	Pts	Qualification
1	North Korea	3	2	1	0	7	3	+4	7	Knockout stage
2	England	3	1	2	0	5	4	+1	5	Knockout stage
3	Brazil	3	1	0	2	2	3	−1	3	
4	Nigeria	3	0	1	2	0	4	−4	1	

Source: FIFA
1 October 2016
16:00

Nigeria	0–1	Brazil
	Report	Micaelly 42'

King Abdullah Stadium, Amman
Attendance: 4,500
Referee: Olga Zadinová (Czech Republic)
1 October 2016
19:00

England	3–3	North Korea
Brazil 20'; Stanway 33'; Russo 90+4'	Report	Sung Hyang-sim 29'; Kim Pom-ui 67'; Ko Kyong-hui 84'

King Abdullah Stadium, Amman
Attendance: 2,500
Referee: Ledya Tafesse (Ethiopia)

4 October 2016
16:00

Nigeria	0–0	England
	Report

Prince Mohammed Stadium, Zarqa
Attendance: 664
Referee: Katja Koroleva (United States)
4 October 2016
19:00

Brazil	0–1	North Korea
	Report	Ri Hae-yon 71'

Prince Mohammed Stadium, Zarqa
Attendance: 2,463
Referee: Anastasia Pustovoitova (Russia)

8 October 2016
16:00

North Korea	3–0	Nigeria
Ri Hae-yon 30', 45', 83'	Report

Amman International Stadium, Amman
Attendance: 947
Referee: Marie-Soleil Beaudoin (Canada)
8 October 2016
16:00

Brazil	1–2	England
Kerolin 36'	Report	Stanway 45+3' (pen.), 60' (pen.)

Al-Hassan Stadium, Irbid
Attendance: 1,400
Referee: Kate Jacewicz (Australia)

=== Group D ===
Pos	Team	Pld	W	D	L	GF	GA	GD	Pts	Qualification
1	Japan	3	3	0	0	13	2	+11	9	Knockout stage
2	Ghana	3	2	0	1	3	6	−3	6	Knockout stage
3	United States	3	1	0	2	9	6	+3	3	
4	Paraguay	3	0	0	3	1	12	−11	0	

Source: FIFA
1 October 2016
16:00

Ghana	0–5	Japan
	Report	Ueki 7'; Endō 18', 21'; Takarada 26'; Chiba 83'

Prince Mohammed Stadium, Zarqa
Attendance: 1,083
Referee: Miriam Patricia Leon Serpas (El Salvador)
1 October 2016
19:00

United States	6–1	Paraguay
Tagliaferri 11'; Kuhlmann 14', 49', 87'; Pickett 69'; Sanchez 82'	Report	Fretes 53'

Prince Mohammed Stadium, Zarqa
Attendance: 2,078
Referee: Anastasia Pustovoitova (Russia)

4 October 2016
16:00

United States	1–2	Ghana
Tagliaferri 5'	Report	Gi. Acheampong 63'; Owusu-Ansah 84' (pen.)

King Abdullah Stadium, Amman
Attendance: 2,000
Referee: Laura Fortunato (Argentina)
4 October 2016
19:00

Paraguay	0–5	Japan
	Report	Takahashi 4'; Nojima 29', 39' (pen.), 44'; Takarada 89'

King Abdullah Stadium, Amman
Attendance: 2,600
Referee: Esther Azzopardi (Malta)

8 October 2016
19:00

Japan	3–2	United States
Ueki 53'; Kanno 75'; Miyazawa 77'	Report	Sanchez 33', 90+1' (pen.)

Amman International Stadium, Amman
Attendance: 2,580
Referee: Yeimy Martinez (Colombia)
8 October 2016
19:00

Paraguay	0–1	Ghana
	Report	Owusu-Ansah 68'

Al-Hassan Stadium, Irbid
Attendance: 1,703
Referee: Finau Vulivuli (Fiji)

== Knockout stage ==
In the knockout stages, if a match is level at the end of normal playing time, a penalty shoot-out is used to determine the winner (no extra time is played).

Quarter-finals
12 October – Amman (AIS)
Mexico	1
Venezuela	2
13 October – Irbid
North Korea	2
Ghana	1
12 October – Amman (AIS)
Germany	1
Spain	2
13 October – Irbid
Japan	3
England	0

Semi-finals
17 October – Amman (KAS)
Venezuela	0
North Korea	3
17 October – Amman (KAS)
Spain	0
Japan	3

Final
21 October – Amman (AIS)
North Korea (p)	0 (5)
Japan	0 (4)
Third place
21 October – Amman (AIS)
Venezuela	0
Spain	4

=== Quarter-finals ===
12 October 2016
16:00

Mexico	1–2	Venezuela
Enrigue 34'	Report	Castellanos 35', 39'

Amman International Stadium, Amman
Attendance: 856
Referee: Anastasia Pustovoitova (Russia)

12 October 2016
19:00

Germany	1–2	Spain
Oberdorf 90+4'	Report	Na. Ramos 9'; E. Navarro 36'

Amman International Stadium, Amman
Attendance: 2,225
Referee: Sandra Braz (Portugal)

13 October 2016
16:00

North Korea	2–1	Ghana
Kim Pom-ui 33' (pen.); Ja Un-yong 90+4'	Report	Gi. Acheampong 81'

Al-Hassan Stadium, Irbid
Attendance: 493
Referee: Laura Fortunato (Argentina)

13 October 2016
19:00

Japan	3–0	England
Endō 3'; Ueki 45+1', 80'	Report

Al-Hassan Stadium, Irbid
Attendance: 1,806
Referee: Katja Koroleva (United States)

=== Semi-finals ===
17 October 2016
16:00

Venezuela	0–3	North Korea
	Report	Kim Pom-ui 15'; Ja Un-yong 71'; Ri Hae-yon 89'

King Abdullah II Stadium, Amman
Attendance: 1,200
Referee: Olga Zadinová (Czech Republic)

17 October 2016
19:00

Spain	0–3	Japan
	Report	Takahashi 14', 76' (pen.); Rodríguez 48' (o.g.)

King Abdullah II Stadium, Amman
Attendance: 3,250
Referee: Marie-Soleil Beaudoin (Canada)

=== Third place match ===
21 October 2016
17:00

Venezuela	0–4	Spain
	Report	E. Navarro 17'; L. Navarro 53', 78', 87'

Amman International Stadium, Amman
Attendance: 3,200
Referee: Ledya Tafesse (Ethiopia)

=== Final ===
21 October 2016
20:00

North Korea	0–0	Japan
	Report
Penalties
Ja Un-yong (penalty scored); Kim Pom-ui (penalty scored); Sung Hyang-sim (penalty scored); Ri Hae-yon (penalty scored); Ri Kum-hyang (penalty scored)	5–4	(penalty scored) Ueki; (penalty scored) Wakisaka; (penalty scored) Takahashi; (penalty missed) Kanekatsu; (penalty scored) Nagano

Amman International Stadium, Amman
Attendance: 12,800
Referee: Kate Jacewicz (Australia)

== Winners ==
2016 FIFA U-17 Women's World Cup winners

North Korea
Second title

== Goalscorers ==
8 goals

- (Spain) Lorena Navarro

5 goals

- (North Korea) Ri Hae-yon
- (Venezuela) Deyna Castellanos

4 goals

- (Japan) Riko Ueki

3 goals

- (England) Georgia Stanway
- (Germany) Giulia Gwinn
- (Japan) Jun Endō
- (Japan) Sakura Nojima
- (Japan) Hana Takahashi
- (New Zealand) Hannah Blake
- (North Korea) Kim Pom-ui
- (Spain) Eva Navarro
- (United States) Civana Kuhlmann
- (United States) Ashley Sanchez

2 goals

- (Germany) Lena Oberdorf
- (Ghana) Gifty Acheampong
- (Ghana) Sandra Owusu-Ansah
- (Japan) Saori Takarada
- (Mexico) Jazmín Enrigue
- (Mexico) Daniela Espinosa
- (Mexico) Jacqueline Ovalle
- (New Zealand) Sam Tawharu
- (North Korea) Ja Un-yong
- (Spain) Clàudia Pina
- (United States) Frankie Tagliaferri

1 goal

- (Brazil) Kerolin
- (Brazil) Micaelly
- (Cameroon) Claudia Dabda
- (Cameroon) Soline Djoubi
- (Cameroon) Alexandra Takounda
- (Canada) Jordyn Huitema
- (Canada) Deanne Rose
- (Canada) Sarah Stratigakis
- (Canada) Hannah Taylor
- (England) Ellie Brazil
- (England) Alessia Russo
- (Germany) Klara Bühl
- (Japan) Remina Chiba
- (Japan) Oto Kanno
- (Japan) Hinata Miyazawa
- (Jordan) Sarah Abu-Sabbah
- (Mexico) Verónica Avalos
- (Mexico) Dayana Cázares
- (Mexico) Gabriela Juárez
- (Mexico) Jimena López
- (Mexico) Celiana Torres
- (North Korea) Ko Kyong-hui
- (North Korea) Sung Hyang-sim
- (Paraguay) Limpia Fretes
- (Spain) Laia Aleixandri
- (Spain) Natalia Ramos
- (United States) Kiara Pickett
- (Venezuela) Maria Cazorla
- (Venezuela) Yerliane Moreno

Own goal

- (Spain) Lucía Rodríguez (against Japan)

== Awards ==
The following awards were given for the tournament:

Golden Ball	Silver Ball	Bronze Ball
(Japan) Fuka Nagano	(North Korea) Sung Hyang-sim	(Venezuela) Deyna Castellanos

Golden Shoe	Silver Shoe	Bronze Shoe
(Spain) Lorena Navarro	(North Korea) Ri Hae-yon	(Venezuela) Deyna Castellanos

FIFA Fair Play Award	Golden Glove
Japan	(Spain) Noelia Ramos
