= 2019 AFC U-16 Women's Championship qualification =

Tournament details
- Host countries: First round: Sri Lanka (Group A); Mongolia (Group B); Tajikistan (Group C); Kyrgyzstan (Group D); Nepal (Group E); Bangladesh (Group F); Second round: Laos (Group A); Myanmar (Group B)
- Dates: First round: 15–23 September 2018; Second round: 27 February – 7 March 2019
- Teams: 30 (from 1 confederation)
- Venue: 8 (in 8 host cities)

Tournament statistics
- Matches played: 68
- Goals scored: 397 (5.84 per match)
- Attendance: 32,890 (484 per match)
- Top scorer: (China) Shao Ziqin (16 goals)

The 2019 AFC U-16 Women's Championship qualification is a women's under-16 football competition which decides the participating teams of the 2019 AFC U-16 Women's Championship.

A total of eight teams qualify to play in the final tournament held in Thailand, four of which are decided by qualification.

== Teams ==
Of the 47 AFC member associations, a total of 33 teams entered the competition, with North Korea, South Korea, and Japan, automatically qualified for the final tournament by their position as the top three teams of the 2017 AFC U-16 Women's Championship and thus not participating in qualification. The final tournament hosts Thailand, despite having automatically qualified for the final tournament, entered to participate in qualification. As a result, a total of 30 teams entered qualification. Due to the increased number of teams, two qualification rounds were scheduled for the first time.

The draw for the first round of the qualifiers was held on 30 May 2018, 15:00 MYT (UTC+8), at the AFC House in Kuala Lumpur, Malaysia. For the first round, the 30 teams were drawn into six groups of five teams. The teams were seeded according to their performance in the 2017 AFC U-16 Women's Championship final tournament and qualification. The following restrictions were also applied:

- The six teams which indicated their intention to serve as qualification group hosts prior to the draw were drawn into separate groups.

Top 3 (not participating in qualification)
1. **North Korea**
2. **South Korea**
3. **Japan**

Participating in qualification first round
Pot 1	Pot 2	Pot 3	Pot 4	Pot 5 (unranked)
4. China (4); 5. **Thailand** (5) **(Q)**; 6. Australia (6); 7. Bangladesh (7) **(H)**; 8. Laos (8); 9. Philippines (9)	10. Chinese Taipei (10); 11. Vietnam (11); 12. Myanmar (12); 13. Iran (13); 14. India (14); 15. Uzbekistan (15)	16. Jordan (16); 17. United Arab Emirates (17); 18. Hong Kong (18); 19. Malaysia (19); 20. Kyrgyzstan (20) **(H)**; 21. Northern Mariana Islands (21)	22. Guam (22); 23. Palestine (23); 24. Singapore (24)	Bahrain (NR); Indonesia (NR); Lebanon (NR); Mongolia (NR) **(H)**; Nepal (NR) **(H)**; Pakistan (NR); Sri Lanka (NR) **(H)**; Syria (NR) **(W)**; Tajikistan (NR) **(H)**

Notes

- Teams in **bold** automatically qualified for the final tournament.
- Teams in italics advanced to second round.
- (H): Qualification first round group hosts
- (Q): Automatically qualified for final tournament regardless of first round qualification results, and did not advance to second round
- (W): Withdrew after draw

Did not enter

- Afghanistan
- Bhutan
- Brunei
- Cambodia
- Iraq
- Kuwait
- Macau
- Maldives
- Oman
- Qatar
- Saudi Arabia
- Timor-Leste
- Turkmenistan
- Yemen

== Player eligibility ==
Players born between 1 January 2003 and 31 December 2005 are eligible to compete in the tournament.

== Format ==
In each group, teams play each other once at a centralised venue.

- In the first round, the six group winners and the two best runners-up advance to the second round. However, the final tournament hosts Thailand do not advance to the second round. If they win their group, the runner-up of their group advances to the second round, or if they are among the two best runners-up, the third best runner-up advances to the second round.
- In the second round, the two group winners and the two group runners-up qualify for the final tournament to join the four automatically qualified teams.

=== Tiebreakers ===
Teams are ranked according to points (3 points for a win, 1 point for a draw, 0 points for a loss), and if tied on points, the following tiebreaking criteria are applied, in the order given, to determine the rankings (Regulations Article 9.3):

1. Points in head-to-head matches among tied teams;
2. Goal difference in head-to-head matches among tied teams;
3. Goals scored in head-to-head matches among tied teams;
4. If more than two teams are tied, and after applying all head-to-head criteria above, a subset of teams are still tied, all head-to-head criteria above are reapplied exclusively to this subset of teams;
5. Goal difference in all group matches;
6. Goals scored in all group matches;
7. Penalty shoot-out if only two teams are tied and they met in the last round of the group;
8. Disciplinary points (yellow card = 1 point, red card as a result of two yellow cards = 3 points, direct red card = 3 points, yellow card followed by direct red card = 4 points);
9. Drawing of lots.

== First round ==
The first round was played between 15 and 23 September 2018.

=== Group A ===
- All matches were held in Sri Lanka.
- Times listed are UTC+5:30.

Pos	Team	Pld	W	D	L	GF	GA	GD	Pts	Qualification
1	China	4	4	0	0	54	0	+54	12	Second round
2	Jordan	4	2	1	1	16	9	+7	7	
3	Uzbekistan	4	2	1	1	7	9	−2	7	
4	Guam	4	1	0	3	5	34	−29	3	
5	Sri Lanka (H)	4	0	0	4	2	32	−30	0	

Source: AFC
Rules for classification: Qualification tiebreakers
(H) Hosts
15 September 2018
11:00

Jordan	0–0	Uzbekistan
	Report

CR & FC Grounds, Colombo
Attendance: 50
Referee: Yoshimi Yamashita (Japan)
15 September 2018
15:00

Sri Lanka	2–4	Guam
Kirushanthini 45+1', 67'	Report	Han 10'; Riley 19', 54'; Teria 64'

CR & FC Grounds, Colombo
Attendance: 150
Referee: Bùi Thị Thu Trang (Vietnam)

17 September 2018
11:00

Guam	0–20	China
	Report	Shao Ziqin 2', 22', 42', 61', 63', 90'; Wang Xinling 27'; Wang Jingyi 30', 54'; Guzman 34' (o.g.); Fu Congcong 44', 61', 71', 71', 75'; Jiang Chenjing 45'; Li Lanlan 56'; Chi Shiying 68'; Wang Yuling 90+1'; Shao Zijia 90+4'

CR & FC Grounds, Colombo
Attendance: 50
Referee: Seinn Cho Aung (Myanmar)
17 September 2018
15:00

Sri Lanka	0–7	Jordan
	Report	Hazem 41'; Al-Maiah 45+1'; Al-Jamaeen 52', 79', 90'; Al-Sweilmin 82'; Al-Hadidi 87'

CR & FC Grounds, Colombo
Attendance: 50
Referee: Saltanat Noroozi (Iran)

19 September 2018
11:00

Uzbekistan	3–1	Guam
Suyunova 23'; Oraniyazova 39'; Sodikova 65'	Report	Teria 64'

CR & FC Grounds, Colombo
Attendance: 10
Referee: Seinn Cho Aung (Myanmar)
19 September 2018
15:00

China	17–0	Sri Lanka
Shao Ziqin 4', 41', 81'; Fu Congcong 8', 36', 45+2'; Wang Siqian 16'; Li Lanlan 18'; Chi Shiying 26'; Jiang Chenjing 49', 50'; Huang Mengyu 64'; Wang Minhui 69', 78'; Wang Xinling 71'; Chen Jiayu 82'; Shao Zijia 90+3'	Report

CR & FC Grounds, Colombo
Attendance: 50
Referee: Asmita Manandhar (Nepal)

21 September 2018
11:00

Jordan	0–9	China
	Report	Shao Ziqin 5', 11', 20', 25'; Shi Xiaomin 28'; Wang Jingyi 39', 45+3'; Chi Shiying 45'; Fu Congcong 50'

CR & FC Grounds, Colombo
Attendance: 50
Referee: Yoshimi Yamashita (Japan)
21 September 2018
15:00

Uzbekistan	4–0	Sri Lanka
Oraniyazova 43'; Saydullaeva 59'; Suyunova 62'; Juraboeva 73'	Report

CR & FC Grounds, Colombo
Attendance: 30
Referee: Bùi Thị Thu Trang (Vietnam)

23 September 2018
11:00

Guam	0–9	Jordan
	Report	Al-Jamaeen 18', 32', 77'; Al-Sweilmin 40'; Qaddourah 48'; Al-Maiah 50'; Asfour 67'; Al-Btoosh 82'; Al-Hadidi 87'

CR & FC Grounds, Colombo
Attendance: 50
Referee: Asmita Manandhar (Nepal)
23 September 2018
15:00

China	8–0	Uzbekistan
Chen Jiayu 14'; Shao Ziqin 15', 30'; Wang Yuling 41'; Wang Siqian 45+1'; Shao Zijia 54'; Fu Congcong 59'; Dai Xinyao 62'	Report

CR & FC Grounds, Colombo
Attendance: 50
Referee: Saltanat Noroozi (Iran)

=== Group B ===
- All matches were held in Mongolia.
- Times listed are UTC+8.

Pos	Team	Pld	W	D	L	GF	GA	GD	Pts	Qualification
1	Laos	4	3	1	0	11	2	+9	10	Second round
2	India	4	2	1	1	12	4	+8	7	
3	Hong Kong	4	2	0	2	9	10	−1	6 (Note: Head-to-head result: Mongolia 1–2 Hong Kong.)	
4	Mongolia (H)	4	2	0	2	11	7	+4	6	
5	Pakistan	4	0	0	4	0	20	−20	0	

Source: AFC
Rules for classification: Qualification tiebreakers
(H) Hosts
Notes:
15 September 2018
13:00

Hong Kong	1–6	India
Limbu 86'	Report	Munda 23'; S. Devi 35', 50' (pen.); Kom 41', 73', 90+1'

MFF Football Centre, Ulanbaatar
Attendance: 32
Referee: Pak Un-jong (North Korea)
15 September 2018
17:00

Mongolia	8–0	Pakistan
Temuulen 25', 30'; D. Solongo 29'; Ganchimeg 54'; Udval 57' (pen.), 79'; Enkhmargad 78'; Otgonjargal 90+4'	Report

MFF Football Centre, Ulanbaatar
Attendance: 241
Referee: Thein Thein Aye (Myanmar)

17 September 2018
13:00

Pakistan	0–3	Laos
	Report	Inthida 6'; Pe 15', 62'

MFF Football Centre, Ulanbaatar
Attendance: 30
Referee: Mahnaz Zokaee (Iran)
17 September 2018
17:00

Mongolia	1–2	Hong Kong
Ganchimeg 47'	Report	Hui 11'; Ishikawa 26'

MFF Football Centre, Ulanbaatar
Attendance: 265
Referee: Kim Yu-jeong (South Korea)

19 September 2018
13:00

India	4–0	Pakistan
Singh 21'; Kiran 42'; Munda 81'; S. Devi 88'	Report

MFF Football Centre, Ulanbaatar
Attendance: 30
Referee: Doumouh Al-Bakkar (Lebanon)
19 September 2018
17:00

Laos	4–0	Mongolia
Phimpha 12'; Inthida 20'; Pe 59', 78'	Report

MFF Football Centre, Ulanbaatar
Attendance: 196
Referee: Thein Thein Aye (Myanmar)

21 September 2018
13:00

Hong Kong	1–3	Laos
Ishikawa 90'	Report	Sengdeuan 49'; Inthida 78'; Chaikham 86'

MFF Football Centre, Ulanbaatar
Attendance: 20
Referee: Mahnaz Zokaee (Iran)
21 September 2018
17:00

India	1–2	Mongolia
Singh 7'	Report	Temuulen 29'; Khulangoo 71'

MFF Football Centre, Ulanbaatar
Attendance: 103
Referee: Pak Un-jong (North Korea)

23 September 2018
13:00

Pakistan	0–5	Hong Kong
	Report	Chan Yee Hing 6'; Chan Wing Lam 31' (pen.); Tsang Pak Tung 44'; Karri Chan 77'; Brewster 89'

MFF Football Centre, Ulanbaatar
Attendance: 33
Referee: Doumouh Al-Bakkar (Lebanon)
23 September 2018
17:00

Laos	1–1	India
Pe 81'	Report	Singh 18'

MFF Football Centre, Ulanbaatar
Attendance: 100
Referee: Kim Yu-jeong (South Korea)

=== Group C ===
- All matches were held in Tajikistan.
- Times listed are UTC+5.

Pos	Team	Pld	W	D	L	GF	GA	GD	Pts	Qualification
1	Thailand (Note: Thailand, as final tournament hosts, automatically qualified regardless of first round qualification results, and did not advance to the second round.)	4	4	0	0	25	1	+24	12	
2	Iran	4	3	0	1	25	3	+22	9	Second round
3	Singapore	4	2	0	2	8	11	−3	6	
4	Tajikistan (H)	4	1	0	3	4	20	−16	3	
5	Northern Mariana Islands	4	0	0	4	0	27	−27	0	

Source: AFC
Rules for classification: Qualification tiebreakers
(H) Hosts
Notes:
15 September 2018
16:00

Northern Mariana Islands	0–12	Iran
	Report	Zandi 5', 16', 18', 57'; Soleimanpour 8'; Masoumi 12'; Piltan 35'; Nasab 54', 59', 67'; Gholami 79', 83'

Hisor Central Stadium, Hisor
Attendance: 180
Referee: Lee Yi-chi (Chinese Taipei)
15 September 2018
19:00

Tajikistan	1–4	Singapore
Sobirova 12'	Report	Syaliza 14', 19', 34'; Tan 33'

Hisor Central Stadium, Hisor
Attendance: 200
Referee: Mi Siyu (China)

17 September 2018
16:00

Singapore	0–6	Thailand
	Report	Khwanjira 41', 51'; Janista 44', 90'; Pluemjai 45+1'; Arita 82'

Hisor Central Stadium, Hisor
Attendance: 140
Referee: Rebecca Durcau (Australia)
17 September 2018
19:00

Tajikistan	3–0	Northern Mariana Islands
Sobirova 18', 56', 57'	Report

Hisor Central Stadium, Hisor
Attendance: 350
Referee: Qin Liang (China)

19 September 2018
16:00

Iran	4–0	Singapore
Zandi 11'; Nasab 12', 21', 31' (pen.)	Report

Hisor Central Stadium, Hisor
Attendance: 100
Referee: Oh Hyeon-jeong (South Korea)
19 September 2018
19:00

Thailand	8–0	Tajikistan
Pluemjai 10', 20', 57'; Suchavadee 28'; Janista 36', 39' (pen.); Fasawang 38', 45'	Report

Hisor Central Stadium, Hisor
Attendance: 160
Referee: Lee Yi-chi (Chinese Taipei)

21 September 2018
16:00

Northern Mariana Islands	0–8	Thailand
	Report	Suchada 36', 66', 83', 89'; Nualanong 39'; Janista 48'; Pluemjai 50'; Chattaya 60'

Hisor Central Stadium, Hisor
Attendance: 110
Referee: Mi Siyu (China)
21 September 2018
19:00

Iran	8–0	Tajikistan
Gholami 3', 90'; Nasab 37', 61' (pen.); Masoumi 50', 79'; Zandi 70'; Abbaspour 87'	Report

Hisor Central Stadium, Hisor
Attendance: 350
Referee: Rebecca Durcau (Australia)

23 September 2018
16:00

Singapore	4–0	Northern Mariana Islands
Tan 20' (pen.), 79', 82'; Rosairiani 57'	Report

Hisor Central Stadium, Hisor
Attendance: 30
Referee: Oh Hyeon-jeong (South Korea)
23 September 2018
19:00

Thailand	3–1	Iran
Janista 60'; Suchavadee 70', 89'	Report	Nasab 12'

Hisor Central Stadium, Hisor
Attendance: 165
Referee: Qin Liang (China)

=== Group D ===
- All matches were held in Kyrgyzstan.
- Times listed are UTC+6.

Pos	Team	Pld	W	D	L	GF	GA	GD	Pts	Qualification
1	Australia	4	4	0	0	39	0	+39	12	Second round
2	Chinese Taipei	4	3	0	1	13	9	+4	9	
3	Indonesia	4	2	0	2	7	16	−9	6	
4	Kyrgyzstan (H)	4	1	0	3	3	16	−13	3	
5	Palestine	4	0	0	4	3	24	−21	0	

Source: AFC
Rules for classification: Qualification tiebreakers
(H) Hosts
15 September 2018
13:00

Indonesia	3–2	Palestine
Febiana 8'; Furyzcha 10'; Firanda 58'	Report	Bawatneh 74'; Sarawi 81'

Dolen Omurzakov Stadium, Bishkek
Attendance: 200
Referee: Fusako Kajiyama (Japan)
15 September 2018
17:00

Kyrgyzstan	1–2	Chinese Taipei
Zarodina 71'	Report	Song Yu-ting 68'; Chiang Tzu-shan 69'

Dolen Omurzakov Stadium, Bishkek
Attendance: 420
Referee: Công Thị Dung (Vietnam)

17 September 2018
13:00

Palestine	0–11	Australia
	Report	Beaumont 3', 65'; Stamatopoulos 12', 39', 45+1'; Jancevski 22'; Wallhead 57', 82'; Hunt 88', 90+3', 90+4'

Dolen Omurzakov Stadium, Bishkek
Attendance: 100
Referee: Law Bik Chi (Hong Kong)
17 September 2018
17:00

Indonesia	3–0	Kyrgyzstan
Furyzcha 44', 62'; Firanda 55'	Report

Dolen Omurzakov Stadium, Bishkek
Attendance: 500
Referee: Yu Hong (China)

19 September 2018
13:00

Australia	11–0	Indonesia
Stamatopoulos 5', 39' (pen.); Beaumont 11', 49', 67', 70'; Jancevski 33', 42'; Jasnos 54'; Morley 60', 76'	Report

Dolen Omurzakov Stadium, Bishkek
Attendance: 75
Referee: Fusako Kajiyama (Japan)
19 September 2018
17:00

Chinese Taipei	8–0	Palestine
Wang Shih-han 13'; Wu Dai-ling 23', 68', 85'; Chiang Tzu-shan 53'; Qumseya 75' (o.g.); Chuang Chih-yi 78'; Lin Yu-syuan 90+3'	Report

Dolen Omurzakov Stadium, Bishkek
Attendance: 100
Referee: Ri Hyang-ok (North Korea)

21 September 2018
13:00

Chinese Taipei	3–1	Indonesia
Chen Jin-wen 20'; Song Yu-ting 52'; Wu Dai-ling 57'	Report	Safira 45+2'

Dolen Omurzakov Stadium, Bishkek
Attendance: 80
Referee: Công Thị Dung (Vietnam)
21 September 2018
17:00

Kyrgyzstan	0–10	Australia
	Report	Morley 4', 38', 84'; Jancevski 32'; Zois 57', 63', 65'; Farmer 61'; Jasnos 73'; McKenna 82'

Dolen Omurzakov Stadium, Bishkek
Attendance: 600
Referee: Law Bik Chi (Hong Kong)

23 September 2018
13:00

Australia	7–0	Chinese Taipei
Morley 8', 17', 44'; Beaumont 45+2'; Jancevski 65', 85'; Chen Yu-chi 78' (o.g.)	Report

Dolen Omurzakov Stadium, Bishkek
Attendance: 70
Referee: Ri Hyang-ok (North Korea)
23 September 2018
17:00

Palestine	1–2	Kyrgyzstan
Sarawi 47'	Report	Akhmatkulova 54', 56'

Dolen Omurzakov Stadium, Bishkek
Attendance: 500
Referee: Yu Hong (China)

=== Group E ===
- All matches were held in Nepal.
- Times listed are UTC+5:45.

Pos	Team	Pld	W	D	L	GF	GA	GD	Pts	Qualification
1	Myanmar	3	3	0	0	19	2	+17	9	Second round
2	Philippines	3	2	0	1	6	5	+1	6	Second round
3	Malaysia	3	0	1	2	4	8	−4	1	
4	Nepal (H)	3	0	1	2	5	19	−14	1	
5	Syria	0	0	0	0	0	0	0	0	Withdrew

Source: AFC
Rules for classification: Qualification tiebreakers
(H) Hosts
19 September 2018
11:30

Myanmar	3–0	Malaysia
Myat Noe Khin 75', 87', 89'	Report

Halchowk Stadium, Kathmandu
Attendance: 300
Referee: Cha Min-ji (South Korea)
19 September 2018
15:30

Philippines	4–0	Nepal
Lazo 42', 45+1'; Alamo 76'; Villacin 82'	Report

Halchowk Stadium, Kathmandu
Attendance: 450
Referee: Anna Sidorova (Uzbekistan)

21 September 2018
11:30

Malaysia	0–1	Philippines
	Report	Alamo 80'

Halchowk Stadium, Kathmandu
Attendance: 60
Referee: Mahsa Ghorbani (Iran)
21 September 2018
15:30

Nepal	1–11	Myanmar
N. Thokar 73'	Report	Zin Mar Htwe 4'; Swe Mar Aung 5', 7', 17', 21', 38'; Myat Noe Khin 10', 29', 33'; Wai Phoo Eain 30'; Pont Pont Pyae Maung 62'

Halchowk Stadium, Kathmandu
Attendance: 200
Referee: Casey Reibelt (Australia)

23 September 2018
11:30

Philippines	1–5	Myanmar
Villacin 62'	Report	Zin Mar Htwe 15', 47'; Myat Noe Khin 20'; Swe Mar Aung 45+2', 90+2'

Halchowk Stadium, Kathmandu
Attendance: 50
Referee: Mahsa Ghorbani (Iran)
23 September 2018
15:30

Malaysia	4–4	Nepal
Hellma 25' (pen.), 78'; Arliana 39', 68'	Report	S. Magar 32'; Waitie 45' (o.g.); P. Rai 57' (pen.); Tamang 85'

Halchowk Stadium, Kathmandu
Attendance: 300
Referee: Casey Reibelt (Australia)

=== Group F ===
- All matches were held in Bangladesh.
- Times listed are UTC+6.

Pos	Team	Pld	W	D	L	GF	GA	GD	Pts	Qualification
1	Bangladesh (H)	4	4	0	0	27	0	+27	12	Second round
2	Vietnam	4	3	0	1	25	2	+23	9	Second round
3	Lebanon	4	2	0	2	14	18	−4	6	
4	United Arab Emirates	4	1	0	3	4	17	−13	3	
5	Bahrain	4	0	0	4	0	33	−33	0	

Source: AFC
Rules for classification: Qualification tiebreakers
(H) Hosts
15 September 2018
11:30

United Arab Emirates	0–4	Vietnam
	Report	Phan Thị Ngọc Trâm 15', 25'; Đỗ Thị Nhi 79'; Bùi Thị Thương 90+3'

Bir Sherestha Shaheed Shipahi Mostafa Kamal Stadium, Dhaka
Attendance: 30
Referee: Kate Jacewicz (Australia)
15 September 2018
15:30

Lebanon	8–0	Bahrain
Fayad 30' (pen.), 90+2'; Maalouf 36'; Alabed 38', 47', 71'; Salha 57'; J. Korjieh 68'	Report

Bir Sherestha Shaheed Shipahi Mostafa Kamal Stadium, Dhaka
Attendance: 50
Referee: Pansa Chaisanit (Thailand)

17 September 2018
11:30

Lebanon	6–3	United Arab Emirates
Assaf 10', 42', 47' (pen.), 66' (pen.); El Tayar 20'; Salha 52'	Report	Al-Mahri 39'; Al-Mazrouei 45'; Khaled 53'

Bir Sherestha Shaheed Shipahi Mostafa Kamal Stadium, Dhaka
Attendance: 100
Referee: Wang Chieh (Chinese Taipei)
17 September 2018
15:30

Bahrain	0–10	Bangladesh
	Report	Ana. Mogini 12'; Manda 17', 72'; Anu. Mogini 19', 35'; Shamsunnahar Jr. 45+1', 57'; S. Khatun 56'; Shamsunnahar (#3) 60' (pen.); T. Khatun 81'

Bir Sherestha Shaheed Shipahi Mostafa Kamal Stadium, Dhaka
Attendance: 1,000
Referee: Edita Mirabidova (Uzbekistan)

19 September 2018
11:30

Bangladesh	8–0	Lebanon
S. Khatun 14', 40'; Slim 19' (o.g.); T. Khatun 23'; Ana. Mogini 27'; Shamsunnahar Jr. 47', 63'; Ro. Akhter 75'	Report

Bir Sherestha Shaheed Shipahi Mostafa Kamal Stadium, Dhaka
Attendance: 300
Referee: Jon Sol-mi (North Korea)
19 September 2018
15:30

Vietnam	14–0	Bahrain
Nguyễn Thị Như Quỳnh 12', 15', 52'; Vũ Thị Hòa 21', 36', 38', 51' (pen.); Đặng Thanh Thảo 29', 39', 41', 44', 45', 74'; Ngô Thị Huyền 86'	Report

Bir Sherestha Shaheed Shipahi Mostafa Kamal Stadium, Dhaka
Attendance: 500
Referee: Wang Chieh (Chinese Taipei)

21 September 2018
11:30

Vietnam	7–0	Lebanon
Vũ Thị Hòa 19' (pen.), 24', 35'; Đặng Thanh Thảo 37'; Phan Thị Ngọc Trâm 63'; Trần Nhật Lan 83', 84'	Report

Bir Sherestha Shaheed Shipahi Mostafa Kamal Stadium, Dhaka
Attendance: 300
Referee: Pansa Chaisanit (Thailand)
21 September 2018
15:30

United Arab Emirates	0–7	Bangladesh
	Report	Shamsunnahar (#3) 7' (pen.); Anu. Mogini 27', 35', 37'; Humaid 45+1' (o.g.); Ana. Mogini 72'; Ilamoni 90+1'

Bir Sherestha Shaheed Shipahi Mostafa Kamal Stadium, Dhaka
Attendance: 6,000
Referee: Jon Sol-mi (North Korea)

23 September 2018
11:30

Bahrain	0–1	United Arab Emirates
	Report	Khaled 63'

Bir Sherestha Shaheed Shipahi Mostafa Kamal Stadium, Dhaka
Attendance: 100
Referee: Edita Mirabidova (Uzbekistan)
23 September 2018
15:30

Bangladesh	2–0	Vietnam
T. Khatun 45+1'; A. Khatun 65'	Report

Bir Sherestha Shaheed Shipahi Mostafa Kamal Stadium, Dhaka
Attendance: 7,000
Referee: Kate Jacewicz (Australia)

=== Ranking of second-placed teams ===
Due to groups having different number of teams (after the withdrawal of Syria from Group E), the results against the fifth-placed teams in five-team groups are not considered for this ranking.

Pos	Grp	Team	Pld	W	D	L	GF	GA	GD	Pts	Qualification
1	C	Iran (Note: Iran advanced to the second round as the Group C runners-up as Thailand were the Group C winners, who as final tournament hosts, automatically qualified regardless of first round qualification results, and did not advance to the second round.)	3	2	0	1	13	3	+10	6	Second round
2	F	Vietnam	3	2	0	1	11	2	+9	6	Second round
3	E	Philippines	3	2	0	1	6	5	+1	6	Second round
4	D	Chinese Taipei	3	2	0	1	5	9	−4	6	
5	B	India	3	1	1	1	8	4	+4	4	
6	A	Jordan	3	1	1	1	9	9	0	4	

Source: AFC
Rules for classification: 1) points; 2) goal difference; 3) goals scored; 4) disciplinary points; 5) drawing of lots.

== Second round ==
The draw for the second round of the qualifiers was held on 7 November 2018, 11:00 MYT (UTC+8), at the AFC House in Kuala Lumpur, Malaysia. For the second round, the eight teams were drawn into two groups of four teams. The teams were seeded according to their performance in the 2017 AFC U-16 Women's Championship final tournament and qualification. The following restrictions were also applied:

- The two teams which indicated their intention to serve as qualification group hosts prior to the draw were drawn into separate groups.

Participating in qualification second round
Pot 1	Pot 2	Pot 3	Pot 4
1. **China**; 2. **Australia**	3. **Bangladesh**; 4. Laos **(H)**	5. Philippines; 6. **Vietnam**	7. Myanmar **(H)**; 8. Iran

Notes

- Teams in **bold** qualified for the final tournament.
- (H): Qualification second round group hosts

The second round was played between 27 February – 7 March 2019.

=== Group A ===
- All matches were held in Laos.
- Times listed are UTC+7.

Pos	Team	Pld	W	D	L	GF	GA	GD	Pts	Qualification
1	Australia	3	3	0	0	7	0	+7	**9**	Final tournament
2	Vietnam	3	1	1	1	1	1	0	**4**	Final tournament
3	Laos (H)	3	1	0	2	2	4	−2	**3**	
4	Iran	3	0	1	2	0	5	−5	**1**	

Source: AFC
Rules for classification: Qualification tiebreakers
(H) Hosts
3 March 2019
15:00

Australia	3–0	Iran
Beaumont 20'; Taranto 40'; McKenna 90+3'	Report

New Laos National Stadium, Vientiane
Attendance: 120
Referee: Abirami Naidu (Singapore)
3 March 2019
18:30

Laos	0–1	Vietnam
	Report	Vilayphone 55' (o.g.)

New Laos National Stadium, Vientiane
Attendance: 1,018
Referee: Yu Hong (China)

5 March 2019
15:00

Vietnam	0–1	Australia
	Report	Jasnos 88'

New Laos National Stadium, Vientiane
Attendance: 100
Referee: Pansa Chaisanit (Thailand)
5 March 2019
18:30

Iran	0–2	Laos
	Report	Phimpha 44'; Chaikham 66'

New Laos National Stadium, Vientiane
Attendance: 384
Referee: Thein Thein Aye (Myanmar)

7 March 2019
15:00

Vietnam	0–0	Iran
	Report

New Laos National Stadium, Vientiane
Attendance: 115
Referee: Yu Hong (China)
7 March 2019
18:30

Australia	3–0	Laos
Beaumont 53'; Lowry 58'; McKenna 84' (pen.)	Report

New Laos National Stadium, Vientiane
Attendance: 1,025
Referee: Abirami Naidu (Singapore)

=== Group B ===
- All matches were held in Myanmar.
- Times listed are UTC+6:30.

Pos	Team	Pld	W	D	L	GF	GA	GD	Pts	Qualification
1	China	3	3	0	0	15	0	+15	**9**	Final tournament
2	Bangladesh	3	2	0	1	11	3	+8	**6**	Final tournament
3	Myanmar (H)	3	1	0	2	3	6	−3	**3**	
4	Philippines	3	0	0	3	0	20	−20	**0**	

Source: AFC
Rules for classification: Qualification tiebreakers
(H) Hosts
27 February 2019
15:00

Bangladesh	10–0	Philippines
T. Khatun 2', 17', 24', 36'; Shamsunnahar Jr. (#11) 17'; Shamsunnahar (#3) 42' (pen.); Villacin 46' (o.g.); Anu. Mogini 58', 86'; Manda 64'	Report

Mandalarthiri Stadium, Mandalay
Attendance: 100
Referee: Mahnaz Zokaee (Iran)
27 February 2019
18:00

China	5–0	Myanmar
Shi Xiaomin 11'; Jiang Chenjing 17', 20', 23'; Dai Xinyao 62'	Report

Mandalarthiri Stadium, Mandalay
Attendance: 1,986
Referee: Edita Mirabidova (Uzbekistan)

1 March 2019
15:00

Philippines	0–7	China
	Report	Lim 11' (o.g.); Zou Mengyao 23'; Zhang Hongyan 26', 33', 44', 77'; Fu Congcong 78'

Mandalarthiri Stadium, Mandalay
Attendance: 250
Referee: Pak Un-jong (North Korea)
1 March 2019
18:00

Myanmar	0–1	Bangladesh
	Report	M. Chakma 68'

Mandalarthiri Stadium, Mandalay
Attendance: 4,540
Referee: Bùi Thị Thu Trang (Vietnam)

3 March 2019
15:00

China	3–0	Bangladesh
Dai Xinyao 29'; Shao Ziqin 46'; Wang Xinling 53'	Report

Mandalarthiri Stadium, Mandalay
Attendance: 125
Referee: Edita Mirabidova (Uzbekistan)
3 March 2019
18:00

Philippines	0–3	Myanmar
	Report	Su Pyae Pyae Kyaw 37'; Zin Mar Htwe 88'; Swe Mar Aung 90+2'

Mandalarthiri Stadium, Mandalay
Attendance: 367
Referee: Mahnaz Zokaee (Iran)

== Qualified teams ==
The following eight teams qualified for the final tournament.

Team	Qualified as	Qualified on	Previous appearances in AFC U-16 Women's Championship^{1}
Thailand	Hosts	20 April 2018	7 (2005, 2007, 2009, 2011, 2013, 2015, 2017)
North Korea	2017 champions	30 May 2018	6 (**2007**, 2009, 2011, 2013, **2015**, **2017**)
South Korea	2017 runners-up	30 May 2018	7 (2005, 2007, **2009**, 2011, 2013, 2015, 2017)
Japan	2017 third place	30 May 2018	7 (**2005**, 2007, 2009, **2011**, **2013**, 2015, 2017)
Australia	Second round Group A winners	7 March 2019	5 (2007, 2009, 2011, 2013, 2017)
Vietnam	Second round Group A runners-up	7 March 2019	0 (debut)
China	Second round Group B winners	1 March 2019	7 (2005, 2007, 2009, 2011, 2013, 2015, 2017)
Bangladesh	Second round Group B runners-up	1 March 2019	2 (2005, 2017)

^{1} Bold indicates champions for that year. Italic indicates hosts for that year.

== Goalscorers ==
- First round: There were 358 goals scored in 56 matches, for an average of 6.39 goals per match.
- Second round: There were 39 goals scored in 12 matches, for an average of 3.25 goals per match.

In total there were 397 goals scored in 68 matches, for an average of 5.84 goals per match.

16 goals

- (China) Shao Ziqin

11 goals

- (China) Fu Congcong

9 goals

- (Australia) Georgia Beaumont
- (Iran) Roghayeh Jalal Nasab

8 goals

- (Australia) Josie Morley
- (Myanmar) Swe Mar Aung

7 goals

- (Bangladesh) Tohura Khatun
- (Bangladesh) Anuching Mogini
- (Myanmar) Myat Noe Khin
- (Vietnam) Đặng Thanh Thảo
- (Vietnam) Vũ Thị Hòa

6 goals

- (Australia) Alana Jancevski
- (China) Jiang Chenjing
- (Iran) Negin Zandi
- (Jordan) Enas Al-Jamaeen
- (Thailand) Janista Jinantuya

5 goals

- (Australia) Nia Stamatopoulos
- (Bangladesh) Shamsunnahar
- (Laos) Pe
- (Thailand) Pluemjai Sontisawat

4 goals

- (China) Wang Jingyi
- (China) Zhang Hongyan
- (Chinese Taipei) Wu Dai-ling
- (Iran) Hasti Gholami
- (Lebanon) Zahraa Assaf
- (Myanmar) Zin Mar Htwe
- (Singapore) Danelle Tan
- (Tajikistan) Amina Sobirova
- (Thailand) Suchada Khamjaroen

3 goals

- (Australia) Anna Hunt
- (Australia) Jordan Jasnos
- (Australia) Tijan McKenna
- (Australia) Paige Zois
- (Bangladesh) Anai Mogini
- (Bangladesh) Sajeda Khatun
- (Bangladesh) Maria Manda
- (Bangladesh) Shamsunnahar
- (China) Chi Shiying
- (China) Dai Xinyao
- (China) Shao Zijia
- (China) Wang Xinling
- (India) Aveka Singh
- (India) Lynda Kom
- (India) Shilky Devi
- (Indonesia) Sheva Imut Furyzcha
- (Iran) Zahra Masoumi
- (Laos) Inthida Khounsy
- (Lebanon) Nathalie Alabed
- (Mongolia) Gantumur Temuulen
- (Singapore) Putri Nur Syaliza
- (Thailand) Suchavadee Chompaeng
- (Vietnam) Nguyễn Thị Như Quỳnh
- (Vietnam) Phan Thị Ngọc Trâm

2 goals

- (Australia) Isabella Wallhead
- (China) Chen Jiayu
- (China) Li Lanlan
- (China) Shi Xiaomin
- (China) Wang Minhui
- (China) Wang Siqian
- (China) Wang Yuling
- (Chinese Taipei) Chiang Tzu-shan
- (Chinese Taipei) Song Yu-ting
- (Guam) Jadyn Riley
- (Guam) Jinae Teria
- (Hong Kong) Karin Ishikawa
- (India) Sunita Munda
- (Indonesia) Firanda
- (Jordan) Aleen Al-Sweilmin
- (Jordan) Lina Al-Maiah
- (Jordan) Shaima Al-Hadidi
- (Kyrgyzstan) Zairina Akhmatkulova
- (Laos) Chaikham
- (Laos) Phimpha Thongsavang
- (Lebanon) Sophie Fayad
- (Lebanon) Syntia Salha
- (Malaysia) Arliana Nabila
- (Malaysia) Hellma Emily
- (Mongolia) Tsolmon Ganchimeg
- (Mongolia) Ser-Od Udval
- (Palestine) Hala Sarawi
- (Philippines) Keanne Alamo
- (Philippines) Maria Lazo
- (Philippines) Mikaela Villacin
- (Sri Lanka) Raguthas Kirushanthini
- (Thailand) Fasawang Kaetkeaw
- (Thailand) Khwanjira Ngok-wong
- (United Arab Emirates) Shahd Khaled
- (Uzbekistan) Leyla Oraniyazova
- (Uzbekistan) Oysara Suyunova
- (Vietnam) Trần Nhật Lan

1 goal

- (Australia) Charlie Farmer
- (Australia) Hana Lowry
- (Australia) Grace Taranto
- (Bangladesh) Rojina Akhter
- (Bangladesh) Monika Chakma
- (Bangladesh) Mosammat Ilamoni
- (Bangladesh) Akhi Khatun
- (China) Huang Mengyu
- (China) Zou Mengyao
- (Chinese Taipei) Chen Jin-wen
- (Chinese Taipei) Chuang Chih-yi
- (Chinese Taipei) Lin Yu-syuan
- (Chinese Taipei) Wang Shih-han
- (Guam) Jada Han
- (Hong Kong) Lily Brewster
- (Hong Kong) Karri Chan
- (Hong Kong) Chan Wing Lam
- (Hong Kong) Chan Yee Hing
- (Hong Kong) Amelia Hui
- (Hong Kong) Sneha Limbu
- (Hong Kong) Tsang Pak Tung
- (India) Kiran
- (Indonesia) Anisa Febiana
- (Indonesia) Safira Ika Putri
- (Iran) Helia Piltan
- (Iran) Maryam Soleimanpour
- (Iran) Zeinab Abbaspour
- (Jordan) Jana Asfour
- (Jordan) Joud Qaddourah
- (Jordan) Lujain Al-Btoosh
- (Jordan) Zaina Hazem
- (Kyrgyzstan) Anna Zarodina
- (Laos) Sengdeuan Phongphailath
- (Lebanon) Christy Maalouf
- (Lebanon) Farah El Tayar
- (Lebanon) Jana Korjieh
- (Mongolia) Dashdorj Solongo
- (Mongolia) Enkhbaatar Enkhmargad
- (Mongolia) Gankhuyag Otgonjargal
- (Mongolia) Gurragchaa Khulangoo
- (Myanmar) Pont Pont Pyae Maung
- (Myanmar) Su Pyae Pyae Kyaw
- (Myanmar) Wai Phoo Eain
- (Nepal) Nikita Thokar
- (Nepal) Preeti Rai
- (Nepal) Sabita Rana Magar
- (Nepal) Sushma Tamang
- (Palestine) Dana Bawatneh
- (Singapore) Rosairiani Suhairi
- (Thailand) Arita Matchawanich
- (Thailand) Chattaya Pratumkul
- (Thailand) Nualanong Muensri
- (United Arab Emirates) Reem Al-Mahri
- (United Arab Emirates) Sendya Al-Mazrouei
- (Uzbekistan) Diyora Juraboeva
- (Uzbekistan) Parvina Sodikova
- (Uzbekistan) Ugiloy Saydullaeva
- (Vietnam) Bùi Thị Thương
- (Vietnam) Đỗ Thị Nhi
- (Vietnam) Ngô Thị Huyền

1 own goal

- (Chinese Taipei) Chen Yu-chi (against Australia)
- (Guam) Rylee Guzman (against China)
- (Laos) Vilayphone Phengsana (against Vietnam)
- (Lebanon) Maria Slim (against Bangladesh)
- (Malaysia) Waitie Taming (against Nepal)
- (Palestine) Yuliana Qumseya (against Chinese Taipei)
- (Philippines) Traci Lim (against China)
- (Philippines) Mikaela Villacin (against Bangladesh)
- (United Arab Emirates) Aalya Humaid (against Bangladesh)
