= Vietnam women's national under-17 football team =

- Association: Vietnam Football Federation (VFF)
- Confederation: AFC (Asia)
- Sub-confederation: AFF (South East Asia)
- Head coach: Masahiko Okiyama
- Captain: Đỗ Thị Hà Vi
- Home stadium: Various
- FIFA code: VIE
First colours	Second colours

Biggest win
- Vietnam 20–0 Northern Mariana Islands (Ho Chi Minh City, Vietnam; 8 October 2026)

Biggest defeat
- Vietnam 0–10 North Korea (Chonburi, Thailand; 16 September 2019)

AFC U-17 Women's Asian Cup
- Appearances: 3 (first in 2019)
- Best result: Quarter-finals (2026)

ASEAN U-16 Women's Championship
- Appearances: 5 (first in 2009)
- Best result: 3rd Place (2009, 2018, 2019, 2025)

The Vietnam women's national under-17 football team represents Vietnam in international football competitions at the qualifications of AFC U-17 Women's Asian Cup and final tournaments, as well as any other under-17 women's international football tournaments. It is governed by the Vietnam Football Federation.

== Competition history ==
=== FIFA U-17 Women's World Cup ===
FIFA U-17 Women's World Cup record
Year	Position	Pld	W	D	L	GF	GA
(New Zealand) 2008	Did not enter						
(Trinidad and Tobago) 2010	Did not enter						
(Azerbaijan) 2012	Did not qualify						
(Costa Rica) 2014	Did not enter						
(Jordan) 2016	Did not qualify						
(Uruguay) 2018	Did not qualify						
(India) ~~2021~~	Did not qualify and cancelled						
(India) 2022	Did not qualify						
(Dominican Republic) 2024	Did not qualify						
(Morocco) 2025	Did not qualify						
(Morocco) 2026	Did not qualify						
(Morocco) 2027	To be determined						
(Morocco) 2028	To be determined						
(Morocco) 2029	To be determined						
Total:0/13	TBD	0	0	0	0	0	0

=== AFC U-17 Women's Asian Cup record ===
Hosts / Year	Result	GP	W	D*	L	GS	GA
(South Korea) 2005	Did not enter						
(Malaysia) 2007	Did not enter						
(Thailand) 2009	Did not enter						
(China) 2011	Did not qualify						
(China) 2013	Did not enter						
(China) 2015	Did not qualify						
(Thailand) 2017	Did not qualify						
(Thailand) 2019	Group Stage	3	0	0	3	0	14
(Indonesia) ~~2022~~	Canceled due to COVID-19 pandemic						
(Indonesia) 2024	Did not qualify						
(China) 2026	Quarter-finals	4	1	1	2	4	8
(China) 2027	Qualified						
(China) 2028	To be determined						
Total:3/10	Quarter-finals	7	1	1	7	3	21

AFC U-17 Women's Asian Cup history
Season	Round	Opponent	Scores	Result	Venue
2019	Group stage	North Korea	0–10	Loss	Chonburi, Thailand
2019	Group stage	South Korea	0–3	Loss	Chonburi, Thailand
2019	Group stage	China	0–1	Loss	Chonburi, Thailand
2026	Group stage	Thailand	2–2	Draw	Suzhou, China
2026	Group stage	China	0–3	Loss	Suzhou, China
2026	Group stage	Myanmar	2–1	Won	Suzhou, China
2026	Quarter-finals	Australia	0–2	Loss	Suzhou, China
2027	Group stage	TBD	–		Suzhou, China
2027	Group stage	TBD	–		Suzhou, China
2027	Group stage	TBD	–		Suzhou, China

=== ASEAN U-16 Women's Championship ===
ASEAN U-16 Women's Championship
Year	Round	GP	W	D	L	GF	GA
(Myanmar) 2009	Third place	5	3	0	2	19	8
(Laos) 2017	Group Stage	4	2	0	2	5	4
(Indonesia) 2018	Third place	6	3	3	0	8	0
(Thailand) 2019	Third place	5	4	0	1	21	2
(Indonesia) 2025	Third place	4	2	1	1	9	4
(Myanmar) 2027	To be determined						
Total	Best: Third place	24	14	4	6	62	18

ASEAN U-16 Women's Asian Cup History
Season	Round	Opponent	Scores	Result	Venue
2009	Group stage	Myanmar B	5–0	Won	Yangon, Myanmar
2009	Group stage	Australia	0–5	Loss	Yangon, Myanmar
2009	Group stage	Philippines	17–0	Won	Yangon, Myanmar
2009	Semi-finals	Thailand	0–3	Loss	Yangon, Myanmar
2009	Third place play-off	Myanmar A	3–0	Won	Yangon, Myanmar
2017	Group stage	Thailand	0–1	Loss	Vientiane, Laos
2017	Group stage	Myanmar	1–2	Loss	Vientiane, Laos
2017	Group stage	Malaysia	2–1	Won	Vientiane, Laos
2017	Group stage	Laos	2–0	Won	Vientiane, Laos
2018	Group stage	Myanmar	0–0	Draw	Palembang, Indonesia
2018	Group stage	Singapore	4–0	Won	Palembang, Indonesia
2018	Group stage	Philippines	3–0	Won	Palembang, Indonesia
2018	Group stage	Malaysia	1–0	Won	Palembang, Indonesia
2018	Semi-finals	Thailand	0–0 a.e.t (pens. 4–5)	Loss	Palembang, Indonesia
2018	Third place play-off	Laos	0–0 a.e.t (pens. 3–0)	Won	Palembang, Indonesia
2019	Group stage	Philippines	2–0	Won	Chonburi, Thailand
2019	Group stage	Timor-Leste	16–0	Won	Chonburi, Thailand
2019	Group stage	Myanmar	2–1	Won	Chonburi, Thailand
2019	Semi-finals	Thailand	0–1	Loss	Chonburi, Thailand
2019	Third place play-off	Laos	1–0	Won	Chonburi, Thailand
2025	Group stage	Cambodia	5–0	Won	Surakarta, Indonesia
2025	Group stage	Myanmar	2–0	Won	Surakarta, Indonesia
2025	Semi-finals	Thailand	1–3	Loss	Surakarta, Indonesia
2025	Third place play-off	Indonesia	1–1 a.e.t (pens. 7–6)	Won	Surakarta, Indonesia

== Results and fixtures ==
The following is a list of match results in the last 12 months, as well as any future matches that have been scheduled.

Win Draw Lose

=== 2026 ===
1 May Asian Cup group stage	Thailand	2–2	Vietnam	Suzhou, China
15:30 UTC+8	Miricah 27'; Wangchin 37'	Report	Phan Thị Thu Phương 35'; Nguyễn Thị Thanh Lam 90+1'	Stadium: Suzhou Taihu Football Sports Centre Pitch 1 Attendance: 75; Referee: Wang Chieh (Chinese Taipei)

4 May Asian Cup group stage	Vietnam	0–3	China	Suzhou, China
19:30 UTC+8		Report	Ju Zhitong 16', 32'; Cheng Wandi 49'	Stadium: Suzhou Taihu Football Sports Centre Pitch 1 Attendance: 344; Referee: Park Se-jin (South Korea)

7 May Asian Cup group stage	Vietnam	2–1	Myanmar	Suzhou, China
19:30 UTC+8	Nguyễn Thị Linh Chi 18'; Nguyen Thi Ngoc Ánh 55'	Report	Thaw Dar Hnin 66'	Stadium: Suzhou Taihu Football Sports Centre Pitch 8 Attendance: 57; Referee: Khuloud Al-Zaabi (United Arab Emirates)

11 May Asian Cup quarter-finals	Vietnam	0–2	Australia	Suzhou, China
15:00 UTC+8		Report	Karaberis 28'; Hussein 31'	Stadium: Suzhou Sports Centre Stadium; Attendance: 93; Referee: Jon Sol-mi (North Korea)

5 October 2026 2027 AFC U-17 Women's Asian Cup qualification	Vietnam	6–0	Palestine	Ho Chi Minh City, Vietnam
18:00 UTC+7	Nguyễn Lê Khánh Đan 32', 47'; Đỗ Thị Hà Vi 39'; Nguyễn Thị Ngọc Ánh 42', 69'; Phan Thị Thu Phương 90'	Report		Stadium: Bà Rịa Stadium; Referee: Yang Shu-ting (Chinese Taipei)

8 October 2026 2027 AFC U-17 Women's Asian Cup qualification	Northern Mariana Islands	0–20	Vietnam	Ho Chi Minh City, Vietnam
18:00 UTC+7		Report	Trương Khánh Chi 1', 12', 18', 46', 70', 74'; Nguyễn Quỳnh Lâm 3', 26', 71'; Phan Thị Thu Phương 16', 84'; Nguyễn Thị Ngọc Ánh 21', 57'; Trương Yến Linh 44'; Đỗ Thị Hà Vi 45+3', 84', 89'; Hà Yến Nhi 59'; Nguyễn Thị Thủy 88'; Phạm Hà My 90'	Stadium: Bà Rịa Stadium; Referee: Esra'a Al-Mbaidin (Jordan)

11 October 2026 2027 AFC U-17 Women's Asian Cup qualification	Vietnam	2–0	Kyrgyzstan	Ho Chi Minh City, Vietnam
18:00 UTC+7				Stadium: Bà Rịa Stadium; Referee: Roziyabonu Yusupova (Uzbekistan)

=== 2027 ===
March/April Asian Cup group stage	Vietnam	v	TBD	Suzhou, China
--:-- UTC+8

April Asian Cup group stage	Vietnam	v	TBD	Suzhou, China
--:-- UTC+8

April Asian Cup group stage	Vietnam	v	TBD	Suzhou, China
--:-- UTC+8

== Players ==
The following players were called up to prepare for the 2026 AFC U-17 Women's Asian Cup

No.	Pos.	Player	Date of birth (age)	Caps	Goals	Club
1	GK	Lù Thị Thùy	8 April 2009 (aged 17)			(Vietnam Football Federation) Than KSVN
2	DF	Nguyễn Dương Phương Nghi	9 May 2009 (aged 16)			(Vietnam Football Federation) Ho Chi Minh City WFC
3	DF	Hoàng Thị Giang	1 March 2009 (aged 17)			(Vietnam Football Federation) Ninh Binh FC
4	DF	Trương Yến Linh	14 March 2010 (aged 16)			(Vietnam Football Federation) Ninh Binh FC
5	MF	Hà Yến Nhi	24 June 2010 (aged 15)			(Vietnam Football Federation) Hanoi FC
6	MF	Nguyễn Thị Ngọc Ánh	16 February 2010 (aged 16)			(Vietnam Football Federation) Hanoi FC
7	MF	Phan Thị Thu Phương	13 March 2010 (aged 16)			(Vietnam Football Federation) Hanoi FC
8	DF	Phạm Thị Trang	4 February 2009 (aged 17)			(Vietnam Football Federation) VFF
9	DF	Nguyễn Thị Linh Chi	3 December 2009 (aged 16)			(Vietnam Football Federation) Ninh Binh FC
10	FW	Nguyễn Thị Minh Ánh	29 July 2009 (aged 16)			(Vietnam Football Federation) Ninh Binh FC
11	MF	Nguyễn Thị Ngọc Ánh	28 August 2009 (aged 16)			(Vietnam Football Federation) VFF
12	GK	Trần Thị Cẩm Mỹ	1 July 2009 (aged 16)			(Vietnam Football Federation) Ho Chi Minh City WFC
13	DF	Ngô Hải Yến	17 August 2009 (aged 16)			(Vietnam Football Federation) VFF
14	FW	Nguyễn Thị Thanh Lam	19 May 2009 (aged 16)			(Vietnam Football Federation) Hanoi FC
15	MF	Nguyễn Thị Phương Thảo	11 October 2010 (aged 15)			(Vietnam Football Federation) Ninh Binh FC
16	FW	Đoàn Thị Thu Hướng	2 September 2009 (aged 16)			(Vietnam Football Federation) Than KSVN
17	MF	Lê Thị Hồng Thái	3 March 2010 (aged 16)			(Vietnam Football Federation) Ho Chi Minh City WFC
18	DF	Đặng Hồ Thanh Phương	3 September 2009 (aged 16)			(Vietnam Football Federation) Ho Chi Minh City WFC
19	MF	Đỗ Thị Hạ Vi	9 September 2010 (aged 15)			(Vietnam Football Federation) Hanoi FC
20	MF	Nguyễn Khánh Ly	20 April 2009 (aged 17)			(Vietnam Football Federation) Thai Nguyen
21	GK	Bùi Phương Thảo	19 February 2010 (aged 16)			(Vietnam Football Federation) Ninh Binh FC
22	DF	Nguyễn Anh Thư	20 April 2010 (aged 16)			(Vietnam Football Federation) Hanoi FC
23	DF	Trần Thị An	10 April 2009 (aged 17)			(Vietnam Football Federation) Ninh Binh FC
