= 2018 AFF U-16 Girls' Championship =

Tournament details
- Host country: Indonesia
- City: Palembang
- Dates: 1–13 May
- Teams: 9

Final positions
- Champions: Thailand (2nd title)
- Runners-up: Myanmar
- Third place: Vietnam
- Fourth place: Laos

Tournament statistics
- Matches played: 20
- Goals scored: 58 (2.9 per match)
- Top scorer: (Myanmar) Myat Noe Khin (9 goals)

The 2018 AFF U-16 Girls' Championship was the 3rd edition of the AFF U-16 Girl's Championship, an international women's football tournament organised by the ASEAN Football Federation (AFF). The tournament was hosted by Indonesia from 1 to 13 May 2018. The defending champion was Thailand. They managed to retain their title.

== Venue ==
(Indonesia) Palembang		2018 AFF U-16 Girls' Championship is located in Palembang
Bumi Sriwijaya Stadium	Gelora Sriwijaya Stadium	2018 AFF U-16 Girls' Championship is located in Palembang
Capacity: 15,000	Capacity: 23,000	2018 AFF U-16 Girls' Championship is located in Palembang

== Group stage ==
The top two teams of each group advanced to the semi-finals. All times listed are Indonesia Western Standard Time (UTC+07:00)

=== Group A ===
Pos	Team	Pld	W	D	L	GF	GA	GD	Pts	Qualification
1	Myanmar	4	3	1	0	16	3	+13	10	Knockout stage
2	Vietnam	4	3	1	0	8	0	+8	10	Knockout stage
3	Malaysia	4	1	1	2	6	6	0	4	
4	Singapore	4	0	2	2	5	15	−10	2	
5	Philippines	4	0	1	3	2	13	−11	1	

Source: AFF
1 May 2018
16:00

Vietnam	0–0	Myanmar
	Report

Bumi Sriwijaya Stadium, Palembang
Referee: Pansa Chaisanit (Thailand)
1 May 2018
16:00

Singapore	3–3	Malaysia
Nurhidayu 56'; Putri 62'; Nur Atikah 77'	Report	Nur Qaseh 3'; Nur Mecca 6'; Ayuna 42'

Gelora Sriwijaya Stadium, Palembang
Attendance: 210
Referee: Thein Thein Aye (Myanmar)

3 May 2018
16:00

Malaysia	2–0	Philippines
Nur Qaseh 10', 13'	Report

Bumi Sriwijaya Stadium, Palembang
Attendance: 300
Referee: Sunita Thongthawin (Thailand)
3 May 2018
16:00

Singapore	0–4	Vietnam
	Report	Isis 5' (o.g.); Vũ Thị Hoa 18', 38'; Đặng Thanh Thảo 58'

Gelora Sriwijaya Stadium, Palembang
Attendance: 100
Referee: Cristina Martinez Ramos (Philippines)

5 May 2018
16:00

Philippines	1–1	Singapore
Laso 26'	Report	Nurhidayu 65'

Bumi Sriwijaya Stadium, Palembang
Attendance: 220
Referee: Sunita Thongthawin (Thailand)
5 May 2018
16:00

Myanmar	2–1	Malaysia
Myat 8', 31'	Report	Hellma 34' (pen.)

Gelora Sriwijaya Stadium, Palembang
Attendance: 100
Referee: Pansa Chaisanit (Thailand)

7 May 2018
16:00

Myanmar	7–1	Singapore
Swe 3', 18', 26', 41', 55'; Myat 17', 38'	Report	Putri 50'

Bumi Sriwijaya Stadium, Palembang
Attendance: 180
Referee: Pansa Chaisanit (Thailand)
7 May 2018
16:00

Vietnam	3–0	Philippines
Vũ Thị Hoa 49'; Đặng Thanh Thảo 51', 81'	Report

Gelora Sriwijaya Stadium, Palembang
Attendance: 100
Referee: Sunita Thongthawin (Thailand)

9 May 2018
16:00

Malaysia	0–1	Vietnam
	Report	Hồ Thị Kim Yến 44'

Bumi Sriwijaya Stadium, Palembang
Attendance: 100
Referee: Jhesa Mae Kaatz (Philippines)
9 May 2018
16:00

Philippines	1–7	Myanmar
Laso 70'	Report	Swe 4', 20'; Myat 18', 44', 49', 54'; Win 37'

Gelora Sriwijaya Stadium, Palembang
Attendance: 190
Referee: Fatmawati Deliana (Indonesia)

=== Group B ===
Pos	Team	Pld	W	D	L	GF	GA	GD	Pts	Qualification
1	Thailand	3	3	0	0	9	1	+8	9	Knockout stage
2	Laos	3	2	0	1	5	2	+3	6	Knockout stage
3	Indonesia (H)	3	1	0	2	3	6	−3	3	
4	Cambodia	3	0	0	3	1	9	−8	0	

Source: AFF
(H) Hosts
2 May 2018
16:00

Thailand	4–1	Indonesia
Jinantuya 22'; Pratumkul 28'; Sontisawat 68'; Khamjaroen 74'	Report	Jasmine 3'

Bumi Sriwijaya Stadium, Palembang
Attendance: 800
Referee: Bui Thi Thu Trang (Vietnam)
2 May 2018
16:00

Cambodia	1–3	Laos
Y. Raksmey 4'	Report	Khounsy 43', 66'; Pe 68'

Gelora Sriwijaya Stadium, Palembang
Attendance: 100
Referee: Jhesa Mae Kaatz (Philippines)

4 May 2018
16:00

Indonesia	2–0	Cambodia
Firanda 31', 71'	Report

Bumi Sriwijaya Stadium, Palembang
Attendance: 200
Referee: Seinn Cho Aung (Myanmar)
4 May 2018
16:00

Laos	0–1	Thailand
	Report	Jinantuya 80'

Gelora Sriwijaya Stadium, Palembang
Attendance: 200
Referee: Abirami Apbai Naidu (Singapore)

6 May 2018
16:00

Thailand	4–0	Cambodia
Meelun 25'; Jinantuya 41', 55', 78'	Report

Bumi Sriwijaya Stadium, Palembang
Attendance: 100
Referee: Bui Thi Thu Trang (Vietnam)
6 May 2018
16:00

Laos	2–0	Indonesia
Pe 4'; Khounsy 51'	Report

Gelora Sriwijaya Stadium, Palembang
Attendance: 820
Referee: Thein Thein Aye (Myanmar)

== Knockout stage ==
In the knockout stage, the penalty shoot-outs are used to decide the winner if necessary (extra time is not used).

Semi-finals
11 May 2018 – Palembang
Thailand (p)	0 (5)
Vietnam	0 (4)
11 May 2018 – Palembang
Myanmar (p)	1 (5)
Laos	1 (4)

Final
13 May 2018 – Palembang
Thailand	1
Myanmar	0
Third place
13 May 2018 – Palembang
Vietnam (p)	0 (3)
Laos	0 (0)

=== Semi-finals ===
11 May 2018
15:00

Thailand	0–0	Vietnam
	Report
Penalties
Sontisawat (penalty scored); Chompaeng (penalty missed); Jinantuya (penalty scored); Khamjaroen (penalty scored); Tonwattanapaiboon (penalty scored); Intaraprasit (penalty scored)	5–4	(penalty scored) Ung Thị Mỹ Trinh; (penalty scored) Trần Thị Hạnh; (penalty scored) Vũ Thị Hoa; (penalty missed) Đặng Thanh Thảo; (penalty scored) Trần Thị Hương Trà; (penalty missed) Lê Thị Bảo Trâm

Bumi Sriwijaya Stadium, Palembang
Attendance: 100
Referee: Abirami Apbai Naidu (Singapore)
11 May 2018
15:00

Myanmar	1–1	Laos
Myat 28'	Report	Thongsavang 57'
Penalties
Myat (penalty missed); Su (penalty scored); Swe (penalty scored); Pont (penalty scored); May (penalty missed); Khaing (penalty missed); Phyu (penalty scored); Zin (penalty scored)	5–4	(penalty scored) Phengsana; (penalty scored) Khounsy; (penalty missed) Thongsavang; (penalty missed) Inthaphone; (penalty scored) Pe; (penalty missed) Phonesavanh; (penalty scored) Chaikham; (penalty missed) Phongphailath

Gelora Sriwijaya Stadium, Palembang
Attendance: 250
Referee: Jhesa Mae Kaatz (Philippines)

=== Third place match ===
13 May 2018
15:00

Vietnam	0–0	Laos
	Report
Penalties
Vũ Thị Hoa (penalty scored); Trần Thị Hạnh (penalty scored); Trần Thị Hương Trà (penalty scored)	3–0	(penalty missed) Phengsana; (penalty missed) Syvonglath; (penalty missed) Khounsy

Bumi Sriwijaya Stadium, Palembang
Attendance: 100
Referee: Thein Thein Aye (Myanmar)

=== Final ===
13 May 2018
19:30

Thailand	1–0	Myanmar
Jinantuya 46'	Report

Bumi Sriwijaya Stadium, Palembang
Attendance: 600
Referee: Abirami Apbai Naidu (Singapore)

== Winner ==
2018 AFF U-16 Girls' Championship Winners

Thailand
2nd title

== Goalscorers ==
9 goals

- (Myanmar) Myat Noe Khin

7 goals

- (Myanmar) Swe Mar Aung

6 goals

- (Thailand) Janista Jinantuya

3 goals

- (Laos) Inthida Khounsy
- (Malaysia) Nur Qaseh Azman
- (Vietnam) Đặng Thanh Thảo
- (Vietnam) Vũ Thị Hoa

2 goals

- (Indonesia) Firanda
- (Laos) Pe Pe
- (Philippines) Maria Diaz Laso
- (Singapore) Nurhidayu Naszri
- (Singapore) Putri Nur Syaliza Sazali

1 goals

- (Cambodia) Y. Raksmey
- (Indonesia) Jasmine Sefia Waynie Cahyono
- (Laos) Pimpha Thongsavang
- (Malaysia) Ayuna Anjani Lamsin
- (Malaysia) Hellma Melly
- (Malaysia) Nur Mecca Rania Mohd Hazri
- (Myanmar) Win Win
- (Singapore) Nur Atikah Ardini Salleh
- (Thailand) Chattaya Pratumkul
- (Thailand) Pluemjai Sontisawat
- (Thailand) Suchada Khamjaroen
- (Thailand) Yadaporn Meelun
- (Vietnam) Hồ Thị Kim Yến

Own goal

- (Singapore) Isis Ang (playing against Vietnam)
