= Vũ Thị Hoa =

Vietnamese footballer

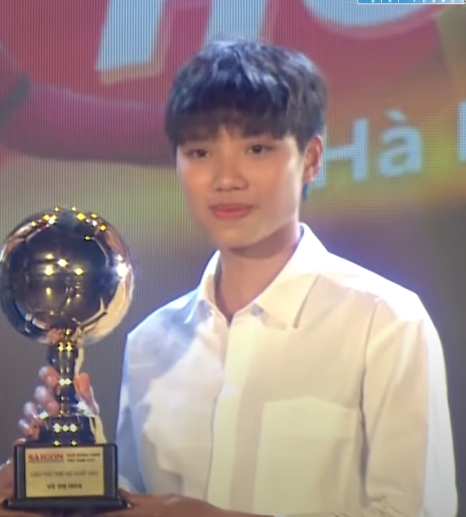
- Vũ Thị Hoa in 2022

Personal information
- Date of birth: 6 November 2003 (age 23)
- Place of birth: Đô Lương, Nghệ An, Vietnam
- Height: 1.62 m (5 ft 4 in)
- Position: Forward

Team information
- Current team: Hà Nội I
- Number: 9

Senior career*
Years	Team	Apps	(Gls)
2020–2021	Hà Nội II	8	(2)
2022–	Hà Nội I	6	(12)

International career^{‡}
2018–2019	Vietnam U17	16	(10)
2020–2022	Vietnam U20	6	(1)
2023–	Vietnam	6	(0)
- * Club domestic league appearances and goals ‡ National team caps and goals as of 1 July 2023

Vũ Thị Hoa (born 6 November 2003) is a Vietnamese footballer who plays as a forward for Women's Championship club Hà Nội I and the Vietnam women's national team. Hoa won the best Vietnamese Young Women Player of the Year in 2022.

== Club career ==
At the age of 11, Hoa participated in the entry test of her local club Sông Lam Nghệ An but was refused by the club because they didn't have a women's sector. In 2015, she joined the youth academy of Hà Nội WFC. She made her league debut with the reserves team of Hà Nội in 2020 at the age of 16.

== International career ==
Making her debut with Vietnam in 2023, Hoa won a gold medal at the 2023 SEA Games in Cambodia and represented Vietnam at the 2023 FIFA Women's World Cup.

Hoa was named as part of Vietnam's squad for the 2026 AFC Asian Cup. She was substituted on in the team's opening match against India and contributed to a 2–1 win, having assisted the late winning goal of Ngân Thị Vạn Sự.

=== International Apps ===
As of match played 10 July 2023

Appearances and goals by national team and year
National Team	Year	Apps	Goals
Vietnam	2023	6	0
Total		6	0

== Honours ==
=== Hanoi Youth ===
- Vietnam National U-19 Women's Championship: 2019, 2020, 2022

=== Hanoi I ===
- Vietnamese Women's National League Runner-up: 2022

=== Vietnam ===
- SEA Games Gold Medal: (gold) 2023

=== Vietnam U16 ===
- AFF U-16 Women's Championship Bronze Medal: 2018

=== Individual ===
- Best Vietnamese Young Women Player of the Year: 2022
- Vietnamese Women's National League Top Scorer: 2022
