= 2025 ASEAN U-16 Women's Championship =

Tournament details
- Host country: Indonesia
- Dates: 20–29 August
- Teams: 9
- Venues: 2 (in 1 host city)

Final positions
- Champions: Australia (2nd title)
- Runners-up: Thailand
- Third place: Vietnam
- Fourth place: Indonesia

Tournament statistics
- Matches played: 13
- Goals scored: 52 (4 per match)
- Top scorer(s): (Indonesia) Nasywa Salsabilla Fattah (Malaysia) Nur Laila Syamila (Thailand) Phatthamon Saengta (4 goals)
- Best player: (Australia) Kaya Jugović
- Best goalkeeper: (Australia) Annabelle Croll

The 2025 ASEAN U-16 Women's Championship was the 5th edition of the ASEAN U-16 Women's Championship, an international women's youth football tournament organised by ASEAN Football Federation (AFF), and hosted by Indonesia.

== Participant teams ==
There was no qualification phase. The following teams, from 9 out of 12 member associations of the AFF, entered the tournament:

Team	Association	Appearance	Previous best performance
Australia	Football Australia	2nd	Winners (2009)
Cambodia	FF Cambodia	4th	4th place (2017)
Indonesia	FA Indonesia	4th	Group Stage (2009, 2017, 2018)
Malaysia	FA Malaysia	5th	Group stage (2009, 2017, 2018, 2019)
Myanmar	Myanmar FF	5th	Runner-up (2018)
Timor-Leste	FF Timor-Leste	2nd	Group Stage (2019)
Singapore	Singapore FA	4th	Group Stage (2017, 2018, 2019)
Thailand	FA Thailand	5th	Winners (2017, 2018, 2019)
Vietnam	Vietnam FF	5th	Third place (2009, 2018, 2019)

Did not enter
Laos
Brunei
Philippines

== Draw ==
The group stage draw was held on Indonesia

Pot 1	Pot 2	Pot 3
1. Indonesia (H); 2. Thailand; 3. Vietnam	4. Malaysia; 5. Myanmar; 6. Singapore	7. Cambodia; 8. Timor-Leste; 9. Australia

== Venues ==
In July 2025, the ASEAN Football Federation officially announced the 2 venues for the tournament which was located in Surakarta, Central Java.

Surakarta
Manahan Stadium	Sriwedari Stadium
Capacity: 20,000	Capacity: 10,000
2025 ASEAN U-16 Women's Championship is located in Java

== Format ==
=== Tiebreakers ===
Teams were ranked according to points (3 points for a win, 1 point for a draw, 0 points for a loss), and if tied on points, the following tiebreaking criteria were applied, in the order given, to determine the rankings (Regulations Article 7.2)

1. Points in head-to-head matches among tied teams;
2. Goal difference in head-to-head matches among tied teams;
3. Goals scored in head-to-head matches among tied teams;
4. If two or more teams are tied, and after applying all head-to-head criteria above, a subset of teams are still tied, all head-to-head criteria above are reapplied exclusively to this subset of teams;
5. Goal difference in all group matches;
6. Goals scored in all group matches;
7. Penalty shoot-out if only two teams are tied and they meet in the last round of the group;
8. Disciplinary points (yellow card = 1 point, red card as a result of two yellow cards = 3 points, direct red card = 3 points, yellow card followed by direct red card = 4 points);
9. Drawing of lots.

== Group stage ==
- All times are local (UTC+7).

=== Group A ===
Pos	Team	Pld	W	D	L	GF	GA	GD	Pts	Qualification
1	Indonesia (H)	2	2	0	0	9	1	+8	6	Advance to knockout stage
2	Malaysia	2	1	0	1	7	4	+3	3	
3	Timor-Leste	2	0	0	2	1	12	−11	0	

Rules for classification: Qualification tiebreakers
(H) Hosts
20 August 2025
19:30

Timor-Leste	0–6	Indonesia
		Nasywa 15', 24', 36'; Jazlyn 20'; Jezlyn 25'; Chorlienka 62'

Manahan Stadium, Surakarta
Referee: Cha Min-ji (South Korea)

22 August 2025
19:30

Malaysia	6–1	Timor-Leste
Qistina 16'; Ummairah 49'; Laila 59', 66', 67'; Mia 83'		Leliana 79'

Manahan Stadium, Surakarta
Referee: Pansa Chaisanit (Thailand)

24 August 2025
19:30

Indonesia	3–1	Malaysia
Nasywa 4'; Jazlyn 15' (pen.); Vivi 82'		Laila 81'

Manahan Stadium, Surakarta
Referee: Asaka Koizumi (Japan)

=== Group B ===
Pos	Team	Pld	W	D	L	GF	GA	GD	Pts	Qualification
1	Vietnam	2	2	0	0	7	0	+7	6	Advance to knockout stage
2	Myanmar	2	1	0	1	4	3	+1	3	
3	Cambodia	2	0	0	2	1	9	−8	0	

Rules for classification: Qualification tiebreakers
21 August 2025
19:30

Cambodia	0–5	Vietnam
		Nguyễn Thị Linh Chi 6'; Nguyễn Thị Minh Ánh 37', 80', 89'; Phan Thị Thu Phương 75'

Sriwedari Stadium, Surakarta
Referee: Wang Chieh (Chinese Taipei)

23 August 2025
15:30

Myanmar	4–1	Cambodia
Pin Myint Yan 26', 55'; L L Sai Hwal Nan 58'; Shin Thant Phyu Sin Pyone 90+3'		Thida Rith 63'

Sriwedari Stadium, Surakarta
Referee: Cha Min-ji (South Korea)

25 August 2025
19:30

Vietnam	2–0	Myanmar
Lê Thị Hồng Thái 69' (pen.); Nguyễn Thị Ngọc Ánh 85' (pen.)

Manahan Stadium, Surakarta
Referee: Wang Chieh (Chinese Taipei)

=== Group C ===
Pos	Team	Pld	W	D	L	GF	GA	GD	Pts	Qualification
1	Australia	2	2	0	0	5	1	+4	6	Advance to knockout stage
2	Thailand	2	1	0	1	8	2	+6	3	Advance to knockout stage
3	Singapore	2	0	0	2	0	10	−10	0	

Rules for classification: Qualification tiebreakers
21 August 2025
15:30

Australia	2–1	Thailand
Nicholas 16'; Jugovic 67'		Nattatida 87'

Sriwedari Stadium, Surakarta
Referee: Trần Thị Thanh (Vietnam)

23 August 2025
19:30

Singapore	0–3	Australia
		Mouitys-Mickalad 25', 82'; Gavranic 53'

Sriwedari Stadium, Surakarta
Referee: Keomany Phengmeuangkhoun (Laos)

25 August 2025
19:30

Thailand	7–0	Singapore
Phatthamon 30', 33', 45+2' (pen.), 55'; Monthida 58'; Kawinthida 85' (pen.); Ellari 90+1'

Sriwedari Stadium, Surakarta
Referee: Cha Min-ji (South Korea)

== Ranking of second-placed teams ==
Only best second-placed team will qualify for the semi-finals.

Pos	Grp	Team	Pld	W	D	L	GF	GA	GD	Pts	Qualification
1	C	Thailand	2	1	0	1	8	2	+6	3	Advance to knockout stage
2	A	Malaysia	2	1	0	1	7	4	+3	3	
3	B	Myanmar	2	1	0	1	4	3	+1	3	

First match(es) will be played: 20 August 2025. Source:
Rules for classification: Qualification tiebreakers

== Knockout stage ==
All times are local, ICT (UTC+7).

In the knockout stage, extra time and a penalty shoot-out will be used to decide the winner if necessary.

=== Bracket ===
Semi-finals
27 August
Vietnam	1
Thailand	3
27 August
Indonesia	0
Australia	3

Final
29 August
Thailand	0
Australia	1
Third place play-off
29 August
Vietnam	1 (7)
Indonesia	1 (6)

=== Semi-finals ===
27 August 2025
15:30

Vietnam	1–3	Thailand
Suracha 16' (o.g.)		Kawinthida 6'; Monthida 42'; Ellari 45+2'

Manahan Stadium, Surakarta
Referee: Wang Chieh (Chinese Taipei)
27 August 2025
19:30

Indonesia	0–3	Australia
		Puckett 22', 27'; Jugovic 59'

Manahan Stadium, Surakarta
Referee: Asaka Koizumi (Japan)

=== Third place play-off ===
29 August 2025
15:30

Vietnam	1–1	Indonesia
Nazwa 2' (o.g.)		Naffeza 15'
Penalties
Nguyễn Thị Ngọc Ánh (penalty scored); Trần Thị An (penalty scored); Nguyễn Thị Linh Chi (penalty scored); Hà Yến Nhi (penalty scored); Lê Thị Hồng Thái (penalty scored); Nguyễn Dương Phương Nghi (penalty scored); Nguyễn Thị Minh Ánh (penalty scored)	7–6	(penalty scored) Naffeza; (penalty scored) Shifana; (penalty scored) Indira; (penalty scored) Febri; (penalty scored) Jazlyn; (penalty scored) Syafia; (penalty missed) Vivi

Manahan Stadium, Surakarta
Referee: Pansa Chaisanit (Thailand)

=== Final ===
29 August 2025
19:30

Thailand	0–1	Australia
		Mouitys-Mickalad 49'

Manahan Stadium, Surakarta
Referee: Cha Min-ji (South Korea)

== Tournament teams ranking ==
Pos	Team	Pld	W	D	L	GF	GA	GD	Pts	Final result
1	Australia	4	4	0	0	9	1	+8	12	Champion
2	Thailand	4	2	0	2	11	4	+7	6	Runner-up
3	Vietnam	4	2	1	1	9	4	+5	7	Third place
4	Indonesia	4	2	1	1	10	5	+5	7	Fourth place
5	Malaysia	2	1	0	1	7	4	+3	3	Eliminated in group stage
6	Myanmar	2	1	0	1	4	3	+1	3	Eliminated in group stage
7	Cambodia	2	0	0	2	1	9	−8	0	Eliminated in group stage
8	Singapore	2	0	0	2	0	10	−10	0	Eliminated in group stage
9	Timor-Leste	2	0	0	2	1	12	−11	0	Eliminated in group stage

== Winner ==
2025 ASEAN U-16 Women's Championship

Australia
2nd title
