= ASEAN U-16 Women's Championship =

- Organiser(s): AFF
- Founded: 2009; 17 years ago
- Region: Southeast Asia
- Teams: 9
- Current champions: Australia (2nd title)
- Most championships: Thailand (3 titles)
- 2025 ASEAN U-16 Women's Championship

The ASEAN U-16 Women's Championship is association football tournament for women's national teams under the age of 15. It was first conducted in 2009 as the AFF U-16 Women's Championship with an upper age limit of 16. It is organised by the ASEAN Football Federation every two years. The official tournament started in 2009, hosted by Myanmar and won by Australia.

== History ==
=== 2009 ===
The first women's ASEAN championship at the youth level, held as the 2009 AFF U-16 Women's Championship was held in Myanmar from 9 October through 18 October 2009. The competition was held at the Thuwunna Stadium and Aung San Stadium.

In the final, Australia defeated Thailand by 8–0.

=== 2017 ===
The second women's ASEAN championship at the youth level, held as the 2017 AFF U-16 Girls' Championship was held in Laos from 8 May through 20 May 2017. The competition was held at the New Laos National Stadium.

In the final, Thailand defeated Philippines by 6–2.

== Results ==
Year	Host	Final			Third Place Match
Year	Host	Champion	Score	Runner-up	Third Place	Score	Fourth Place
2009; Details	Myanmar	Australia	8–0	Thailand	Vietnam	3–0	Myanmar A
2017; Details	Laos	Thailand	6–2	Philippines	Myanmar	3–1	Cambodia
2018; Details	Indonesia	Thailand	1–0	Myanmar	Vietnam	0–0 (a.e.t.) (3–0) p	Laos
2019; Details	Thailand	Thailand	0–0 (a.e.t.) (5–3) p	Laos	Vietnam	1–0	Philippines
2025; Details	Indonesia	Australia	1–0	Thailand	Vietnam	1–1 (a.e.t.) (7–6) p	Indonesia
2027; Details	Myanmar

== Records and statistics ==
=== Total wins ===
Team	Champions	Runners-up	Third-place	Fourth-place
Thailand	3 (2017, 2018, 2019)	2 (2009, 2025)	–	–
Australia	2 (2009, 2025)	–	–	–
Myanmar	–	1 (2018)	1 (2017)	1 (2009)
Philippines	–	1 (2017)	–	1 (2019)
Laos	–	1 (2019)	–	1 (2018)
Vietnam	–	–	4 (2009, 2018, 2019, 2025)	–
Cambodia	–	–	–	1 (2017)
Indonesia	–	–	–	1 (2025)

== Participating nations ==
Team	(Myanmar) 2009 (8)	(Laos) 2017 (9)	(Indonesia) 2018 (9)	(Thailand) 2019 (9)	(Indonesia) 2025 (9)	Total
Australia	1st	×	×	×	1st	2
Cambodia	×	4th	GS	GS	GS	4
Indonesia	GS	GS	GS	×	4th	4
Laos	×	GS	4th	2nd	×	3
Malaysia	GS	GS	GS	GS	GS	5
Myanmar	4th	3rd	2nd	GS	GS	5
Myanmar B	GS	×	×	×	×	1
Philippines	GS	2nd	GS	4th	×	4
Singapore	×	GS	GS	GS	GS	4
Thailand	2nd	1st	1st	1st	2nd	5
Timor-Leste	×	×	×	GS	GS	2
Vietnam	3rd	GS	3rd	3rd	3rd	5

Legend

- 1st — Champions
- 2nd — Runners-up
- 3rd — Third place
- 4th — Fourth place
- GS — Group stage
- q — Qualified for the current tournament
- × — Did not enter / Withdrew / Banned
- — Hosts

== Overall team records ==
As per statistical convention in football, matches decided in extra time are counted as wins and losses, while matches decided by penalty shoot-outs are counted as draws. 3 points per win, 1 point per draw and 0 points per loss.

As end of 2025 ASEAN U-16 Women's Championship

Rank	Team	Part	Pld	W	D	L	GF	GA	Dif	Pts
1	Thailand	5	26	19	3	4	103	20	+83	60
2	Vietnam	5	24	14	4	6	62	18	+44	46
3	Myanmar	5	23	11	3	9	85	33	+52	36
4	Laos	3	15	8	3	4	33	15	+18	28
5	Australia	2	9	9	0	0	51	2	+49	27
6	Philippines	4	17	6	1	10	34	57	−23	19
7	Malaysia	5	17	5	1	11	23	77	−54	16
8	Indonesia	4	13	3	2	8	16	41	−25	11
9	Singapore	4	13	2	2	9	10	45	−35	8
10	Cambodia	4	14	1	1	12	8	42	−34	4
11	Myanmar B	1	3	1	0	2	5	18	−13	3
12	Timor-Leste	2	5	0	0	5	1	66	−65	0

== Awards ==
Tournament	Top scorer(s)	Goals	Fair play award	Best player	Best goalkeeper
2009			Thailand		
2017	(Myanmar) Myat Noe Khin (Thailand) Ploychompoo Somnuek	6	Thailand		
2018	(Myanmar) Myat Noe Khin	9			
2019	(Laos) Pe	12			
2025	(Indonesia) Nasywa Salsabilla Fattah (Malaysia) Nur Laila Syamila (Thailand) Phatthamon Saengta	4		(Australia) Kaya Jugovic	(Australia) Annabelle Croll

=== Winning coaches ===
Year	Team	Tournament
2009	Australia	
2017	Thailand	(Thailand) Cheewathan Krueawan
2018	Thailand	(Thailand) Naruephon Kaenson
2019	Thailand	(Thailand) Naruephon Kaenson
2025	Australia	(Australia) Michael Cooper

== See also ==
- AFF Women's Championship
- AFF U-19 Women's Championship
