= 2019 AFF U-16 Girls' Championship =

2019 AFF U-15 Women's Championship
Tournament details
- Host country: Thailand
- City: Chonburi
- Dates: 9–21 May
- Teams: 9

Final positions
- Champions: Thailand (3rd title)
- Runners-up: Laos
- Third place: Vietnam
- Fourth place: Philippines

Tournament statistics
- Matches played: 20
- Goals scored: 117 (5.85 per match)
- Top scorer(s): (Laos) Pe (12 goals)

The 2019 AFF U-15 Women's Championship was the 4th edition of the AFF U-16 Women's Championship, an international women's football tournament organised by the ASEAN Football Federation (AFF). The tournament was hosted by Thailand from 9 to 21 May 2019. The defending champion was Thailand. They managed to retain their title.

== Venue ==
Chonburi Province

Chonburi Campus Stadium
13°24′41″N 100°59′34″E
Capacity: 11,000
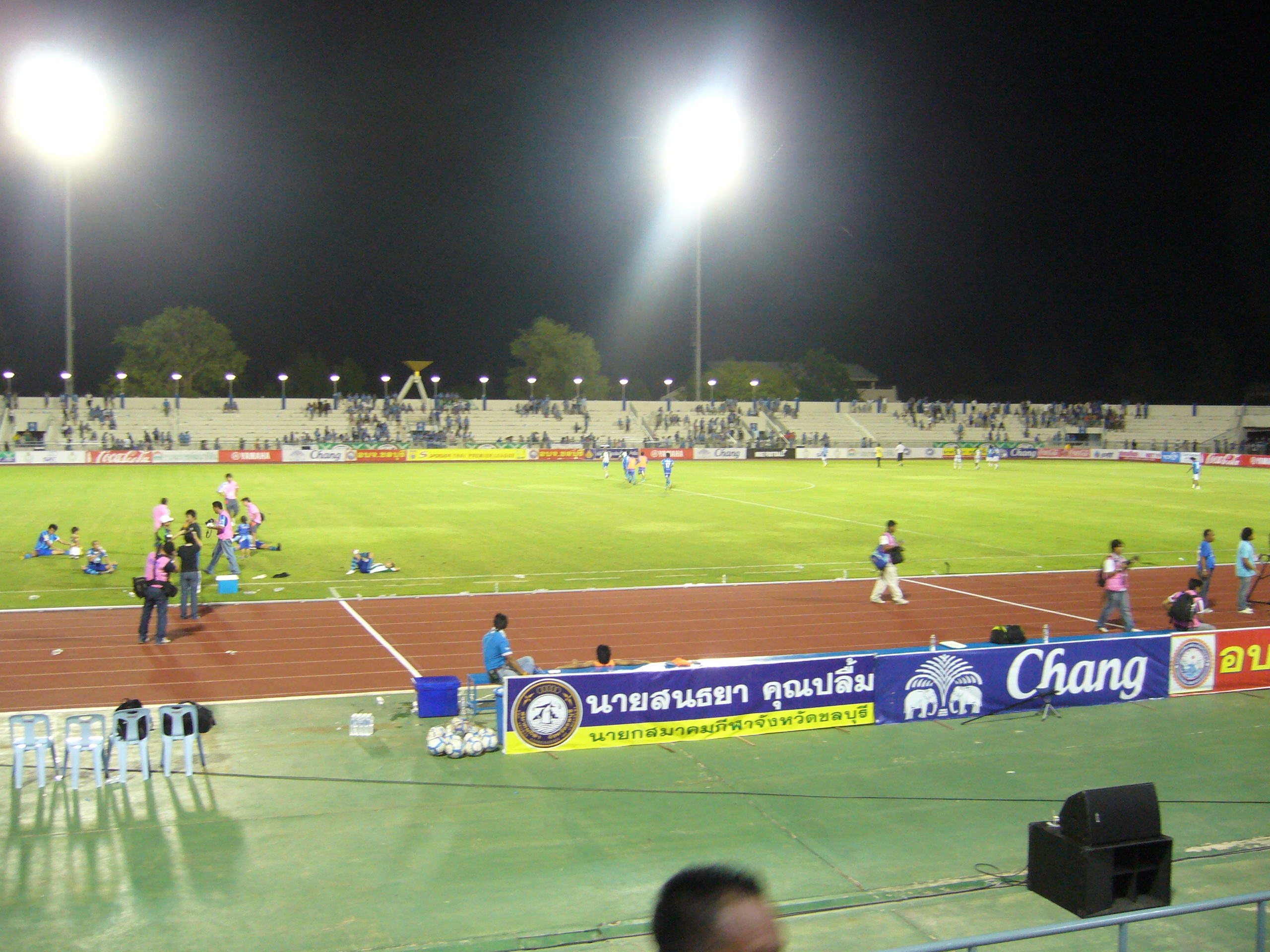

== Group stage ==
The top two teams of each group advanced to the semi-finals. All times listed are Thai Standard Time (UTC+07:00)

=== Group A ===
Pos	Team	Pld	W	D	L	GF	GA	GD	Pts	Qualification
1	Vietnam	3	3	0	0	20	1	+19	9	Knockout stage
2	Philippines	3	2	0	1	17	2	+15	6	Knockout stage
3	Myanmar	3	1	0	2	27	7	+20	3	
4	Timor-Leste	3	0	0	3	0	54	−54	0	

Source: AFF
10 May 2019
15:00

Myanmar	26–0	Timor-Leste
Than Than Soe 3', 19', 21', 24'; Yu Yu Naing 5', 27', 40+1', 44', 86'; Zin Moe Pyae 7', 28', 36'; Su Myat Noe 17', 30', 38', 57', 58', 62', 77'; Htoo Theingi Naing 23', 34'; Nan Cho Hmwe 59'; Paing Pyo Hsu 65'; Aye Hiet Hiet Paing 67'; X. Pinto 68' (o.g.); Wai Hin Phyo 80+1'	Report

Chonburi Campus Stadium 1, Chonburi
Attendance: 20
10 May 2019
18:00

Vietnam	2–0	Philippines
Bùi Thị Thương 36'; Trần Nhật Lan 62'	Report

Chonburi Campus Stadium 1, Chonburi
Attendance: 60

12 May 2019
15:00

Timor-Leste	0–16	Vietnam
	Report	Trần Nhật Lan 1', 57', 61', 77', 80+1'; Nguyễn Thị Như Quỳnh 2', 8', 10', 18', 32'; Bùi Thị Thương 5', 26'; Hồ Ngọc Bảo Hân 22'; Ngô Thị Thanh Trúc 30'; Nguyễn Thanh Thúy 58'; Tạ Thị Thủy 67'

Chonburi Campus Stadium 1, Chonburi
Attendance: 20
12 May 2019
18:00

Philippines	5–0	Myanmar
Villacin 2'; Perez 21'; Danoso 46' (pen.); Alforque 52'; Tolentino 67'	Report

Chonburi Campus Stadium 1, Chonburi
Attendance: 75

14 May 2019
15:00

Myanmar	1–2	Vietnam
Zin Moe Pyae 18'	Report	Trần Nhật Lan 53', 69' (pen.)

Chonburi Campus Stadium 1, Chonburi
Attendance: 50
Referee: Sunita Thongthawin (Thailand)
14 May 2019
18:00

Philippines	12–0	Timor-Leste
Sy 7', 18', 49', 51', 56'; Danoso 23'; Lucban 35', 70'; Alforque 38'; Ortillo 54', 80'; Luna 65'	Report

Chonburi Campus Stadium 1, Chonburi
Attendance: 50

=== Group B ===
Pos	Team	Pld	W	D	L	GF	GA	GD	Pts	Qualification
1	Laos	4	4	0	0	18	2	+16	12	Knockout stage
2	Thailand (H)	4	3	0	1	22	5	+17	9	Knockout stage
3	Malaysia	4	2	0	2	3	16	−13	6	
4	Singapore	4	1	0	3	2	14	−12	3	
5	Cambodia	4	0	0	4	2	10	−8	0	

Source: AFF
(H) Hosts
9 May 2019
1500

Malaysia	0–4	Laos
	Report	Pe 21', 30', 35'; Chinda 38'

Chonburi Campus Stadium
Attendance: 120
Referee: Thein Thein Aye (Myanmar)
9 May 2019
18:00

Cambodia	1–2	Singapore
Sokkheang 70'	Report	Alwydia 75'; Danelle 80'

Chonburi Campus Stadium
Attendance: 50

11 May 2019
15:00

Cambodia	1–2	Malaysia
Sokkheang 23'	Report	Qaseh 40+1'; Celine 71'

Chonburi Campus Stadium
Attendance: 60
11 May 2019
1800

Singapore	0–5	Thailand
	Report	Thawanrat 12' (pen.), 14'; Chattaya 25'; Thanchanok 61'; Kantisa 73'

Chonburi Campus Stadium
Attendance: 100

13 May 2019
15:00

Laos	7–0	Singapore
Souphaphone 5'; Pe 16', 21', 25'; Chaikham 56', 67'; Chinda 60'	Report

Chonburi Campus Stadium
Attendance: 50
13 May 2019
1800

Thailand	4–0	Cambodia
Kantisa 8'; Sasithon 18', 30'; Chattaya 28'	Report

Chonburi Campus Stadium
Attendance: 100
Referee: Bùi Thị Thu Trang (Vietnam)

15 May 2019
15:00

Laos	2–0	Cambodia
Chinda 29'; Seungdeuan 49'	Report

Chonburi Campus Stadium
Attendance: 50
Referee: Jhesa Mae Kaatz (Philippines)
15 May 2019
18:00

Malaysia	0–11	Thailand
	Report	Phinyada 1', 12'; Nualanong 3'; Thawanrat 33'; Thanatphat 47', 72'; Thanchanok 57'; Chattaya 63', 69'; Saranya 70'; Yadaporn 80+1'

Chonburi Campus Stadium
Attendance: 100

17 May 2019
15:00

Singapore	0–1	Malaysia
	Report	Nurfarisya 22'

Chonburi Campus Stadium
Attendance: 50
17 May 2019
18:00

Thailand	2–5	Laos
Phinyada 30'; Thawanrat 38' (pen.)	Report	Pe 1', 6', 15', 80'; Souphaphone 26'

Chonburi Campus Stadium
Attendance: 200

== Knockout stage ==
In the knockout stage, the penalty shoot-outs are used to decide the winner if necessary (extra time is not used).

Semi-finals
19 May 2019 – Chonburi
Vietnam	0
Thailand	1
19 May 2019 – Chonburi
Laos	3
Philippines	1

Final
21 May 2019 – Chonburi
Thailand(p)	0 (5)
Laos	0 (3)
Third place match
21 May 2019 – Chonburi
Vietnam	1
Philippines	0

=== Semi-finals ===
19 May 2019
15:00

Vietnam	0–1	Thailand
	Report	Chattaya 20'

Chonburi Campus Stadium
Attendance: 200
Referee: Rita Gani (Malaysia)
19 May 2019
18:00

Laos	3–1	Philippines
Pe 1', 43'; Thippakone 22'	Report	Alferez 59'

Chonburi Campus Stadium
Attendance: 80

=== Third place match ===
21 May 2019
15:00

Vietnam	1–0	Philippines
Trần Nhật Lan 36'	Report

Chonburi Campus Stadium
Attendance: 50

=== Final ===
21 May 2019
18:00

Thailand	0–0	Laos
	Report
Penalties
Thawanrat (penalty scored); Nualanong (penalty scored); Janyaporn (penalty scored); Kanyarat (penalty scored); Supapron (penalty scored)	5–3	(penalty scored) Pe; (penalty missed) Chaikham; (penalty scored) Vilayphone; (penalty scored) Chinda

Chonburi Campus Stadium
Attendance: 250
Referee: Thein Thein Aye (Myanmar)

== Winner ==
2019 AFF U-15 Girls' Championship Winners

Thailand
3rd title

== Goalscorers ==
There were 117 goals scored in 20 matches, for an average of 5.85 goals per match.

12 goals

- (Laos) Pe

9 goals

- (Vietnam) Trần Nhật Lan

7 goals

- (Myanmar) Su Myat Noe

5 goals

- (Myanmar) Yu Yu Naing
- (Philippines) Bianca Ellaine Remis Sy
- (Thailand) Chattaya Pratumkul
- (Vietnam) Nguyễn Thị Như Quỳnh

4 goals

- (Myanmar) Than Than Soe
- (Myanmar) Zin Moe Pyae
- (Thailand) Thawanrat Promthongmee

3 goals

- (Laos) Chinda Sihalath
- (Thailand) Phinyada Phathakor
- (Vietnam) Bùi Thị Thương

2 goals

- (Cambodia) Chroung Sokkheang
- (Laos) Chaikham
- (Laos) Souphaphone Xaysoula
- (Myanmar) Htoo Theingi Naing
- (Philippines) Chenny Mae Danoso
- (Philippines) Jonalyn Culaban Lucban
- (Philippines) Lanie Payongayon Ortillo
- (Philippines) Maegan Andrea Gacho Alforque
- (Thailand) Kantisa Imchamnan
- (Thailand) Sasithon Dima
- (Thailand) Thanatphat Bungthong
- (Thailand) Thanchanok Jansri

1 goal

- (Laos) Seungdeuan Phongphailath
- (Laos) Thippakone Syvonglath
- (Malaysia) Nur Qaseh Azman
- (Malaysia) Celine Chuang
- (Malaysia) Nurfarisya Hanim Muhamad Zaki
- (Myanmar) Aye Hiet Hiet Paing
- (Myanmar) Nan Cho Hmwe
- (Myanmar) Paing Pyo Hsu
- (Myanmar) Wai Hin Phyo
- (Philippines) Angely Bebanco Alferez
- (Philippines) Celestine Beatrice Bravo Luna
- (Philippines) Jenny Porteza Perez
- (Philippines) Mikaela Jacqueline Vinalon Villacin
- (Philippines) Rae Mikella Puno Tolentino
- (Singapore) Alwydia Mohammad Faizal
- (Singapore) Danelle Tan
- (Thailand) Nualanong Muensri
- (Thailand) Saranya Lamee
- (Thailand) Yadaporn Meelun
- (Vietnam) Hồ Ngọc Bảo Hân
- (Vietnam) Nguyễn Thanh Thúy
- (Vietnam) Ngô Thị Thanh Trúc
- (Vietnam) Tạ Thị Thủy

1 own goal

- (Timor-Leste) Xenia Maria Soares Pinto (against Myanmar)

== Tournament teams ranking ==
This table will show the ranking of teams throughout the tournament.

Pos	Team	Pld	W	D	L	GF	GA	GD	Pts	Final result
1	Thailand	6	4	1	1	23	5	+18	13	Champion
2	Laos	6	5	1	0	21	3	+18	16	Runner-up
3	Vietnam	5	4	0	1	21	2	+19	12	Third place
4	Philippines	5	2	0	3	18	6	+12	6	Fourth place
5	Myanmar	3	1	0	2	27	7	+20	3	Eliminated in group stage
6	Malaysia	4	2	0	2	3	16	−13	6	Eliminated in group stage
7	Singapore	4	1	0	3	2	14	−12	3	Eliminated in group stage
8	Cambodia	4	0	0	4	2	10	−8	0	Eliminated in group stage
9	Timor-Leste	3	0	0	3	0	54	−54	0	Eliminated in group stage

Updated to match(es) played on unknown. Source:
