= Australia women's national under-17 soccer team =

Australian under-17 women's soccer team

Australia under-17
- Nickname: Junior Matildas
- Association: Football Federation Australia
- Confederation: AFC (Asia)
- Sub-confederation: AFF (Southeast Asia)
- Head coach: Michael Cooper
- FIFA code: AUS
First colours	Second colours

First international
- Australia 1–2 South Korea (Sydney, Australia; 17 January 2007)

Biggest win
- Australia 28–0 Palestine (Hanoi, Vietnam; 25 August 2016)

Biggest defeat
- Australia 0–7 North Korea (Chonburi, Thailand; 14 September 2017)

FIFA U-17 Women's World Cup
- Appearances: 1 (first in 2026)
- Best result: Group Stage (2026)

The Australian women's national under-17 soccer team represents Australia in international women's under-17 soccer. The team is controlled by Football Australia (FA), the governing body for soccer in Australia, which is currently a member of the Asian Football Confederation (AFC) and the regional ASEAN Football Federation (AFF) since leaving the Oceania Football Confederation (OFC) in 2006. The team's official nickname is the Junior Matildas (previously Mini Matildas).

== History ==
The first Australian women's national under-17 team was assembled in January 2007 following Australia's entry into the Asian Football Confederation. Australia U17's first game was a 1–2 loss against South Korea at the Australian Youth Olympic Festival in Sydney under inaugural coach Mike Mulvey. In March they competed at the 2007 AFC U-16 Women's Championship in Malaysia, finishing fifth.

== Coaching staff ==
Position	Name
Head coach	(Australia) Michael Cooper

=== Manager history ===
- Mike Mulvey (2007)
- Robbie Hooker (2009)
- Vicky Linton (2011–2013)
- Ante Juric (2013–2016)
- Raeanne Dower (2017–2025)
- Michael Cooper (2025–2026)
- Emily Husband (November 2026–)

== Players ==
=== Current squad ===
The following 21 players were named for the 2026 FIFA U-17 Women's World Cup on 17 October – 7 November 2026.

Caps and goals are current as of 25 October 2026 after the match against Mexico.

No.	Pos.	Player	Date of birth (age)	Caps	Goals	Club
1	GK	Annabelle Croll	7 July 2009 (age 17)	5	0	(Football Australia) Sydney FC
12	GK	Alyse Oppedisano	26 February 2009 (age 17)	4	0	(Football Australia) Sydney FC
18	GK	Dali Gorr-Burchmore	1 March 2010 (age 16)	11	0	(Football Australia) Melbourne City
2	DF	Willa Pearson (captain)	24 December 2010 (age 15)	12	2	(Football Australia) Sydney FC
3	DF	Charlotte Bradshaw	17 April 2009 (age 17)	8	1	(Football Australia) Western Sydney Wanderers
13	DF	Maeve Nicholas	3 May 2009 (age 17)	13	4	(Football Australia) Adelaide United
15	DF	Rubi Sullivan	7 January 2009 (age 17)	5	1	(Football Australia) Sydney FC
16	DF	Tehya Aspland	7 April 2009 (age 17)	11	0	(Football Australia) Canberra United
17	DF	Mary dal Broi	5 May 2010 (age 16)	7	0	(Football Australia) Western Sydney Wanderers
19	DF	Harper Pell	6 March 2010 (age 16)	5	0	(Football Australia) NWS Spirit
20	DF	Sakura Leong	25 May 2009 (age 17)	14	1	(Football Australia) Perth Glory
21	DF	Hayley Muir	9 January 2009 (age 17)	9	2	(Football Australia) Perth Glory
4	MF	Keira Sarris	24 September 2009 (age 17)	13	2	(Football Australia) Melbourne City
5	MF	Abbie Puckett	2 June 2009 (age 17)	7	3	(Football Australia) Sydney FC
6	MF	Frida Karaberis	7 March 2011 (age 15)	9	2	(Football Australia) Western Sydney Wanderers
7	MF	Claire Corbett	18 February 2010 (age 16)	13	2	(Football Australia) Sydney FC
8	MF	Kaya Jugovic	23 January 2009 (age 17)	13	2	(Football Australia) Melbourne City
9	FW	Sienna Calvanese	16 December 2009 (age 16)	5	3	(Football Australia) Melbourne City
10	FW	Leyla Hussein	29 March 2009 (age 17)	10	2	(Football Australia) Melbourne Victory
11	FW	Matilda Diaz-Wadewitz	20 May 2009 (age 17)	9	0	(Football Australia) Macarthur Rams
14	FW	Jada Taylor	31 July 2010 (age 16)	13	0	(Football Australia) Sydney FC

=== Recent call-ups ===
The following players have been called up to the squad within the last 12 months and still remain eligible for selection.

Pos.	Player	Date of birth (age)	Caps	Goals	Club	Latest call-up
GK	Aleisha Manthey		1	0	(Australia) Queensland Academy of Sport	v. Thailand, 28 November 2025
GK	Zoe Reader		0	0	(Australia) Eastern Suburbs	v. Thailand, 28 November 2025
DF	Liana Luong		8	0	(Australia) Macarthur Rams	2026 AFC U-17 Women's Asian Cup
DF	Mya Andrews		0	0	(Australia) Football West Academy	v. Thailand, 28 November 2025
DF	Zoe Dumont		2	0	(Australia) Football West Academy	v. Thailand, 28 November 2025
DF	Madison Gabila		2	0	(Australia) Western Sydney Wanderers	v. Thailand, 28 November 2025
DF	Aeryn Tarrant		4	0	(Australia) Melbourne Victory	v. Thailand, 28 November 2025
DF	Lucy Wicks		2	0	(Australia) Queensland Academy of Sport	v. Thailand, 28 November 2025
DF	Tessa Young		3	0	(Australia) Western Sydney Wanderers	v. Thailand, 28 November 2025
MF	Izabella Rako		5	7	(Australia) Melbourne City	2026 AFC U-17 Women's Asian Cup
MF	Milla Butler		1	0	(Australia) Football West Academy	v. Thailand, 28 November 2025
MF	Lauren Disney		2	0	(Australia) FFSA NTC	v. Thailand, 28 November 2025
MF	Layla Habib		1	0	(Australia) Melbourne City	v. Thailand, 28 November 2025
MF	Chelsea Harpur		2	0	(Australia) Bulls FC Academy	v. Thailand, 28 November 2025
MF	Annie O'Farrell		2	0	(Australia) Queensland Academy of Sport	v. Thailand, 28 November 2025
MF	Adriana Tustonjic		1	0	(Australia) Melbourne City	v. Thailand, 28 November 2025
MF	Natalia Webbe		0	0	(Australia) Queensland Academy of Sport	v. Thailand, 28 November 2025
FW	Theodora Mouithys-Mickalad		8	10	(Australia) Perth Glory	2026 FIFA U-17 Women's World Cup^{PRE}
FW	Tyra Bagiante		3	2	(Australia) Macarthur Rams	2026 AFC U-17 Women's Asian Cup
FW	Zahra Ahmed		2	0	(Australia) Queensland Academy of Sport	v. Thailand, 28 November 2025
FW	Anika Driscoll		1	0	(Australia) Western Sydney Wanderers	v. Thailand, 28 November 2025
FW	Ruby King		1	0	(Australia) FFSA NTC	v. Thailand, 28 November 2025
FW	Alara Turkkan		3	1	(Australia) Western Sydney Wanderers	v. Thailand, 28 November 2025
FW	Holly Tweedale		2	0	(Australia) Manly United	v. Thailand, 28 November 2025

Notes:

- ^{PRE} Preliminary squad / on stand-by.

== Results and fixtures ==
The following is a list of recent match results, as well as any future matches that have been scheduled.

Legend

Win Draw Loss Fixture

=== 2025 ===
25 November Friendly	Australia	0–2	Thailand	Sydney, Australia
19:00 AEDT		Report	Prawnapa 12'; Kawinthida 44'	Stadium: Wanderers Football Park

28 November Friendly	Australia	1–1	Thailand	Gosford, Australia
16:00 AEDT	Turkkan 3'	Report	Nattatida 86'	Stadium: polytec Stadium

=== 2026 ===
2 May 2026 AFC U-17 Women's Asian Cup GS	Australia	2–0	India	Suzhou, China
19:30 CST	Mouithys-Mickalad 25'; Basnett 59' (o.g.)	Report		Stadium: Suzhou Taihu Football Sports Centre; Attendance: 80; Referee: Maïka Vanderstichel (France)

5 May 2026 AFC U-17 Women's Asian Cup GS	Lebanon	1–1	Australia	Suzhou, China
15:30 CST	Karnib 59'	Report	Mouithys-Mickalad 30'	Stadium: Suzhou Taihu Football Sports Centre; Attendance: 157; Referee: Roziyabonu Yusupova (Uzbekistan)

8 May 2026 AFC U-17 Women's Asian Cup GS	Japan	5–0	Australia	Suzhou, China
15:30 CST	Hanashiro 16', 22'; Tamamura 35'; Kurita 52'; Higuchi 73'	Report		Stadium: Suzhou Taihu Football Sports Centre; Attendance: 50; Referee: Yu Hong (China)

11 May 2026 AFC U-17 Women's Asian Cup QF	Vietnam	0–2	Australia	Suzhou, China
15:30 CST		Report	Karaberis 28'; Hussein 31'	Stadium: Suzhou Sports Centre Stadium; Attendance: 93; Referee: Jon Sol-mi (North Korea)

14 May 2026 AFC U-17 Women's Asian Cup SF	Japan	4–0	Australia	Suzhou, China
15:00 CST	Bradshaw 3' (o.g.); Kurita 24', 38'; Ota 74'	Report		Stadium: Suzhou Sports Centre Stadium; Attendance: 175; Referee: Trần Thị Thanh (Vietnam)

19 October 2026 FIFA U-17 Women's World Cup GS	Australia	1–1	Chile	Salé, Morocco
18:00 MST	Bradshaw 63'	Report	Concha 33'	Stadium: Mohammed VI Football Academy; Attendance: 171; Referee: Josephine Wanjiru (Kenya)

22 October 2026 FIFA U-17 Women's World Cup GS	Spain	3–1	Australia	Salé, Morocco
15:00 MST	Gálvez 10', 66' (pen.); Vizuete 16'	Report	Karaberis 68'	Stadium: Mohammed VI Football Academy; Attendance: 200; Referee: Alejandra Quisbert (Bolivia)

25 October 2026 FIFA U-17 Women's World Cup GS	Mexico	1–0	Australia	Salé, Morocco
15:00 MST	Reyes 35'	Report		Stadium: Mohammed VI Football Academy; Attendance: 310; Referee: Emanuela Rusta (Albania)

== Competitive record ==
=== FIFA U-17 Women's World Cup ===
Year	Result	Pld	W	D	L	GF	GA
(New Zealand) 2008	Did not qualify						
(Trinidad and Tobago) 2010	Did not qualify						
(Azerbaijan) 2012	Did not qualify						
(Costa Rica) 2014	Did not qualify						
(Jordan) 2016	Did not qualify						
(Uruguay) 2018	Did not qualify						
(India) 2022	Did not qualify						
(Dominican Republic) 2024	Did not qualify						
(Morocco) 2025	Did not qualify						
(Morocco) 2026	Group stage	3	0	1	2	2	5
(Morocco) 2027	To be determined						
(Morocco) 2028	To be determined						
(Morocco) 2029	To be determined						
Total	1/13	3	0	1	2	2	5

=== AFC U-16 Women's Championship/AFC U-17 Women's Asian Cup ===
AFC U-16/U-17 Women's Asian Cup record
Year	Result	Position	Pld	W	D	L	GF	GA
(South Korea) 2005	was not a member of the Asian Football Confederation							
(Malaysia) 2007	Group stage	5th	2	0	1	1	1	3
(Thailand) 2009	Fourth place	4th	5	3	0	2	19	11
(China) 2011	Fifth place	5th	5	1	0	4	4	9
(China) 2013	Group stage	5th	2	1	0	1	8	2
(China) 2015	did not qualify							
(Thailand) 2017	Group stage	6th	3	1	0	2	3	14
(Thailand) 2019	Fourth place	4th	5	1	2	2	9	8
(Indonesia) ~~2022~~	Competition cancelled							
(Indonesia) 2024	Group Stage	7th	3	0	0	3	2	10
(China) 2026	Semi-finals	4th	5	2	1	2	5	10
(China) 2027	qualfied							
Total:8/10	Semi-finals	4th	30	9	4	17	51	67

=== ASEAN U-16 Women's Championship ===
ASEAN U-16 Women's Championship record
Year	Result	Position	Pld	W	D	L	GF	GA
(Myanmar) 2009	Champions	1st	5	5	0	0	45	1
(Indonesia) 2025	Champions	1st	4	4	0	0	9	1
Total	2/2	2 titles	9	9	0	0	54	2

=== ASEAN U-19 Women's Championship ===
ASEAN U-19 Women's Championship record
Year	Result	Position	Pld	W	D	L	GF	GA
(Indonesia) 2022	Champions	1st	5	5	0	0	17	1
(Indonesia) 2023	See Australia under-20 soccer team							
(Vietnam) 2025	See Australia under-20 soccer team							
Total	1/1	1 title	5	5	0	0	17	1

== See also ==
- Soccer in Australia
- Australia women's national soccer team
- Australia women's national under-23 soccer team
- Australia women's national under-20 soccer team
