= Philippines women's national under-17 football team =

Philippines Women's U-17
- Association: Philippine Football Federation
- Confederation: AFC (Asia)
- Sub-confederation: AFF (Southeast Asia)
- FIFA code: PHI

Asian Cup
- Appearances: 2 (first in 2024)
- Best result: Group stage (2024, 2026)

ASEAN Championship
- Appearances: 4 (first in 2009)
- Best result: Runners-up (2017)

The Philippines women's national under-17 football team is a national association football youth team of the Philippines and is controlled by the Philippine Football Federation.

The Philippines has qualified for the AFC U-17 Women's Asian Cup for the first time in its history on September 24, 2023 and made their first appearance in the 2024 edition.

== Results and fixtures ==
The following is a list of match results in the last 12 months, as well as any future matches that have been scheduled.

Win Draw Loss Fixture

=== 2026 ===
April Unofficial Friendly	Myanmar	v	Philippines	China
--:-- UTC+8		Report

May 2 2026 AFC U-17 Women's Asian Cup	South Korea	5–0	Philippines	Suzhou, China
15:30 UTC+8	Baek Seo-yeong 6', 14', 34', 55'; Kim Hee-na 67'	Report		Stadium: Suzhou Taihu Football Sports Centre Pitch 8 Attendance: 25; Referee: Yu Hong (China)

May 5 2026 AFC U-17 Women's Asian Cup	Philippines	0–8	North Korea	Suzhou, China
19:30 UTC+8		Report	Ri Ui-gyong 31'; Ri Yu-song 45+1'; Kim Won-sim 55', 79'; Won Sol-syong 60'; Yu Jong-hyang 68'; Ri Kyong-im 70'; Song Won-yong 85'	Stadium: Suzhou Taihu Football Sports Centre Pitch 8 Referee: Alissar Baddour (Syria)

May 8 2026 AFC U-17 Women's Asian Cup	Philippines	0–0	Chinese Taipei	Suzhou, China
19:30 UTC+8		Report		Stadium: Suzhou Taihu Football Sports Centre Pitch 8 Referee: Roziyabonu Yusupova (Uzbekistan)

September 26 Friendly	India	2–4	Philippines	Goa, India
--:-- UTC+5:30	A. Kumari 85'; Joya 89'	Report	? 47', 50', 68', 79'

September 29 Friendly	India	2–0	Philippines	Goa, India
--:-- UTC+5:30	A. Kumari 26' (pen.), 50'	Report

October 5 2027 AFC U-17 Women's Asian Cup qualification	Uzbekistan	0–4	Philippines	Tashkent, Uzbekistan
19:00 UTC+5		Report	Granger 51', 63', 65'; Chheng 68'	Stadium: Do'stlik Stadium Training Pitch 1 Referee: Tian Jin (China)

October 11 2027 AFC U-17 Women's Asian Cup qualification	Philippines	3–0	Bangladesh	Tashkent, Uzbekistan
19:00 UTC+5	Bascara 73'; Granger 90', 90+1'	Report		Stadium: Do'stlik Stadium Training Pitch 1 Referee: Nodira Mirzoeva (Tajikistan)

== Coaching staff ==
=== Current coaching staff ===
As of April 29, 2026

Position	Name
Head coach	(Australia) Nahuel Arrarte
Assistant coaches	(Philippines) Let Dimzon
Assistant coaches	(Philippines) Jim Ashley Flores
Goalkeeping coach	(Spain) (Australia) José Bello Amigo
Team manager	(Philippines) Selu Lozano

== Players ==
=== Current squad ===
The following 23 players were named to the squad for the 2026 AFC U-17 Women's Asian Cup.

Caps and goals updated as of May 8, 2026, after the match against Chinese Taipei.

No.	Pos.	Player	Date of birth (age)	Caps	Goals	Club
1	GK	Leah Bradley	April 7, 2009 (aged 16)	7	0	(United States Soccer Federation) Wilmington Hammerheads
18	GK	Ava Strauss	October 14, 2009 (aged 16)	0	0	(Canadian Soccer Association) Semiahmoo Secondary School
22	GK	Brooke Solis	September 29, 2009 (aged 16)	1	0	(Philippine Football Federation) Makati
2	DF	Brooklin Gleason	May 27, 2010 (aged 15)	0	0	(United States Soccer Federation) Classical Academy High School
3	DF	Maeva Javier	October 10, 2010 (aged 15)	5	0	(Philippine Football Federation) Makati
7	DF	Alyssa Cromwell	June 23, 2009 (aged 16)	3	0	(United States Soccer Federation) Kentwood High School
8	DF	Addison Subala	January 21, 2010 (aged 16)	3	0	(United States Soccer Federation) Pioneer High School
10	DF	Luna Rivera	December 10, 2009 (aged 16)	16	1	(Canadian Soccer Association) Surrey United SC
13	DF	Zada Goslee	August 10, 2009 (aged 16)	2	0	(United States Soccer Federation) LaGuardia High School
14	DF	Zayla Lintag	August 31, 2009 (aged 16)	3	0	(United States Soccer Federation) Elite Academic Academy
16	DF	Bethany Kingsbury	May 27, 2009 (aged 16)	0	0	(United States Soccer Federation) Mountain View High School
17	DF	Aiselyn Sia	February 23, 2009 (aged 17)	11	1	(United States Soccer Federation) Legends FC
4	MF	Khloe Rivera	August 23, 2010 (aged 15)	3	0	(United States Soccer Federation) Valley Christian High School
5	MF	Yurika Valdeviesco	July 27, 2009 (aged 16)	2	0	(Philippine Football Federation) Tuloy
6	MF	Kaida Mizzo	February 16, 2009 (aged 17)	6	1	(United States Soccer Federation) The Potomac School
21	MF	Savannah Chheng	October 16, 2011 (aged 14)	3	0	(United States Soccer Federation) Oak Valley Middle School
9	FW	Chiara Mizzo	February 16, 2009 (aged 17)	6	1	(United States Soccer Federation) The Potomac School
11	FW	Sachiko Davis	April 13, 2010 (aged 16)	3	0	(United States Soccer Federation) Tahoma High School
12	FW	Ariana Enderes	April 10, 2010 (aged 16)	6	2	(United States Soccer Federation) VDA
15	FW	Ava Garcia	June 29, 2009 (aged 16)	3	0	(United States Soccer Federation) Washington High School
19	FW	Maya Penetrante	February 10, 2009 (aged 17)	0	0	(United States Soccer Federation) St. Paul VI Catholic High School
20	FW	Quinn Kellogg	December 17, 2009 (aged 16)	0	0	(United States Soccer Federation) Del Oro High School
23	FW	Louraine Evangelista	January 7, 2009 (aged 17)	11	2	(Philippine Football Federation) Tuloy

=== Recent call-ups ===
The following players have been called up to the squad within the last 12 months.

Pos.	Player	Date of birth (age)	Caps	Goals	Club	Latest call-up
GK	Richelle Matondo		0	0	(Philippines) Beach Hut	2026 AFC U-17 Women's Asian Cup Qualifiers
DF	Jilliana Dagpin		3	1	(Philippines) Makati	2026 AFC U-17 Women's Asian Cup Qualifiers
DF	Ellie Deleon		3	0	(United States) Legends FC San Diego	2026 AFC U-17 Women's Asian Cup Qualifiers
DF	Adriana Bautista		1	0	(Philippines) Makati	2026 AFC U-17 Women's Asian Cup Qualifiers
DF	Sonia Del Rosario		1	0	(Philippines) Beach Hut	2026 AFC U-17 Women's Asian Cup Qualifiers
DF	Carlene Dy		1	0	(Philippines) Makati	2026 AFC U-17 Women's Asian Cup Qualifiers
MF	Audrey Alviar		2	0	(Philippines) Makati	2026 AFC U-17 Women's Asian Cup Qualifiers
MF	Aryanna Capsa		2	0	(Norway) Stabæk	2026 AFC U-17 Women's Asian Cup Qualifiers
MF	Ashly Hughes		1	0	(Philippines) Makati	2026 AFC U-17 Women's Asian Cup Qualifiers
MF	Candice Salas		1	0	(Philippines) Beach Hut	2026 AFC U-17 Women's Asian Cup Qualifiers

=== Previous squad ===
- 2024 AFC U-17 Women's Asian Cup

== Competitive record ==
=== FIFA U-17 Women's World Cup ===
FIFA U-17 Women's World Cup record
Host/Year	Result	Position	Pld	W	D	L	GF	GA
(New Zealand) 2008	Did not qualify							
(Trinidad and Tobago) 2010	Did not qualify							
(Azerbaijan) 2012	Did not qualify							
(Costa Rica) 2014	Did not qualify							
(Jordan) 2016	Did not qualify							
(Uruguay) 2018	Did not qualify							
(India) 2022	Did not qualify							
(Dominican Republic) 2024	Did not qualify							
(Morocco) 2025	Did not qualify							
(Morocco) 2026	Did not qualify							
(Morocco) 2027	To be determined							
(Morocco) 2028	To be determined							
Total:0/10	0	0	0	0	0	0	0	0

=== AFC U-17 Women's Asian Cup ===
AFC U-17 Women's Asian Cup record
Host/Year	Result	Position	Pld	W	D	L	GF	GA
(South Korea) 2005	Did not qualify							
(Malaysia) 2007	Did not qualify							
(Thailand) 2009	Did not qualify							
(China) 2011	Did not qualify							
(China) 2013	Did not qualify							
(China) 2015	Did not qualify							
(Thailand) 2017	Did not qualify							
(Thailand) 2019	Did not qualify							
(Indonesia) 2024	Group stage	5th	3	1	1	1	7	8
(China) 2026	Group stage	9th	3	0	1	2	0	13
(China) 2027	Qualified							
(China) 2028	To be determined							
Total:2/10	Group stage	5th	6	1	2	3	7	21

=== ASEAN U-16 Women's Championship ===
Champions Runners-up Third place

ASEAN U-16 Women's Championship record
Host/Year	Result	Position	Pld	W	D	L	GF	GA
(Myanmar) 2009	Group stage	8/8	3	0	0	3	1	30
(Laos) 2017	Runners-up	2/9	5	4	0	1	13	8
(Indonesia) 2018	Group stage	8/9	4	0	1	3	2	13
(Thailand) 2019	Third place match	4/9	5	2	0	3	18	6
(Indonesia) 2025	Did not enter							
Total	Runners-up	4/5	17	6	1	10	34	57

== See also ==
- Football in the Philippines
- Philippines women's national football team
- Philippines women's national under-20 football team
