= Timor-Leste women's national under-17 football team =

Timor Leste women's U-17
- Association: FFTL
- Confederation: AFC
- Head coach: Emral Abus
- Captain: Angela
- Most caps: 9 players (4)
- FIFA code: TLS
| First colours | Second colours |

First international
- Timor-Leste 0–4 Guam (Makati, Philippines; 15 October 2010)

Biggest win
- None

Biggest defeat
- Myanmar 26–0 Timor-Leste (Chonburi, Thailand; 10 May 2019)

The Timor-Leste women's national under-17 football team is a national women's association football youth team of Timor Leste and is controlled by the Federação de Futebol de Timor-Leste (FFTL), represents Timor-Leste in international women's under-17 or under-17 tournament.

== History ==
Their international debut came in October 2010 when they participated in the qualifying campaign for the 2011 AFC U-16 Women's Championship in China, with their opening match against Guam women's national under-16 football team ended with a 0–4 defeat. Given their history, it was no surprise that they crashed out with defeats against the likes of Guam, Vietnam, Philippines and Singapore.

== Tournament Record ==
=== FIFA U-17 Women's World Cup record ===
FIFA U-17 Women's World Cup
| Hosts / Year | Result | GP | W | D | L | GS | GA |
|---|---|---|---|---|---|---|---|
| (New Zealand) 2008- (Morocco) 2025 | Did not enter | | | | | | |
| (Morocco) 2026- 2029 | To be determined | | | | | | |
| Total | N/A | 0 | 0 | 0 | 0 | 0 | 0 |

=== AFC U-17 Women's Asian Cup record ===
| AFC U-17 Women's Asian Cup Finals | | | | | | | | AFC U-16 Women's Championship Qualifications | | | | | |
| Year | Result | Pld | W | D* | L | GF | GA | GP | W | D* | L | GS | GA |
|---|---|---|---|---|---|---|---|---|---|---|---|---|---|
| (South Korea) 2005- (Thailand) 2009 | Did not enter | 0 | 0 | 0 | 0 | 0 | 0 | 0 | 0 | 0 | 0 | 0 | 0 |
| (China) 2011 | Did not qualify | 0 | 0 | 0 | 0 | 0 | 0 | 4 | 0 | 0 | 4 | 0 | 33 |
| (China) 2013- (Indonesia) 2024 | Did not enter | 0 | 0 | 0 | 0 | 0 | 0 | 0 | 0 | 0 | 0 | 0 | 0 |
| Total | N/A | 0 | 0 | 0 | 0 | 0 | 0 | 4 | 0 | 0 | 4 | 0 | 33 |

=== AFF U-16 Women's Championship record ===
AFF U-16 Women's Championship
| Year | Result | Pld | W | D | L | Gs | GA | GD | P |
|---|---|---|---|---|---|---|---|---|---|
| (Myanmar) 2009 | Did not Enter | | | | | | | | |
| (Laos) 2017 | Did not Enter | | | | | | | | |
| (Indonesia) 2018 | Did not Enter | | | | | | | | |
| (Thailand) 2019 | Group Stage | 3 | 0 | 0 | 3 | 0 | 54 | –54 | 0 |
| (Indonesia) 2025 | Group Stage | 2 | 0 | 0 | 2 | 1 | 12 | –11 | 0 |
| Total | 2/5 | 5 | 0 | 0 | 5 | 1 | 66 | –65 | 0 |

== Current staff ==
As of October 2010

| Position | Name | Nationality |
|---|---|---|
| Manager | | |
| Head coach | | |
| Assistant coach | | |
| Goalkeeping coach | | |
| Team Doctor | | |

== List of Coaches ==
| Coach | Coaching period | Pld | W | D | L | Achievements |
|---|---|---|---|---|---|---|
| (Timor-Leste) Filomeno Cabral Fernandes | 2010 | 4 | 0 | 0 | 4 | 2011 AFC U-16 Women's Championship qualification – Did not qualify (First Time) |
