= Indonesia women's national under-17 football team =

Indonesian junior national association football team

Indonesia women's U-17
- Nickname: Garuda Pertiwi
- Association: PSSI (Football Association of Indonesia)
- Confederation: AFC (Asia)
- Sub-confederation: AFF (Southeast Asia)
- Head coach: Timo Scheunemann
- FIFA code: IDN
First colours	Second colours

AFC U-17 Women's Asian Cup
- Appearances: 3 (first in 2005)
- Best result: Group stage (2005, 2024)

ASEAN U-16 Women's Championship
- Appearances: 4 (first in 2009)
- Best result: Fourth place (2025)

The Indonesia women's national under-17 football team is a national association football youth team of Indonesia and is controlled by the Football Association of Indonesia.

Indonesia has qualified for the AFC U-17 Women's Asian Cup only three time in its history, with their first appearance being in 2005 and the second appearance being in 2024 as hosts.

== Results and fixtures ==
The following is a list of match results in the last 12 months, as well as any future matches that have been scheduled.

Win Draw Loss Fixture

=== 2026 ===
14 August 2026 Srikandi Merdeka Cup 2026 GS	Indonesia	7–0	Saudi Arabia	Kudus, Indonesia
16:00 UTC+7	Arabela 5'; Nori 23'; Kayla 37' (pen.), 40'; Nadifa 49'; Fadilla 78'; Hegazy 90' (o.g.)	Report		Stadium: Supersoccer Arena

16 August 2026 Srikandi Merdeka Cup 2026 GS	Malaysia	0–3	Indonesia	Kudus, Indonesia
16:00 UTC+7				Stadium: Supersoccer Arena

18 August 2026 Srikandi Merdeka Cup 2026 GS	Indonesia	1–0	Hong Kong	Kudus, Indonesia
20:00 UTC+7				Stadium: Supersoccer Arena

21 August 2026 Srikandi Merdeka Cup 2026 Semi Finals	Indonesia	3–0	Jordan	Kudus, Indonesia
20:00 UTC+7				Stadium: Supersoccer Arena

23 August 2026 Srikandi Merdeka Cup 2026 F	Thailand	1–0	Indonesia	Kudus, Indonesia
15:00 UTC+7				Stadium: Supersoccer Arena

5 October 2026 2027 Asian Cup qualification	Indonesia	2–0	Bahrain	Bishan, Singapore
17:00 UTC+8	Arabela 19', 21'	Report		Stadium: Bishan Stadium; Referee: Yu Hong (China)

8 October 2026 2027 Asian Cup qualification	Saudi Arabia	1–3	Indonesia	Bishan, Singapore
17:00 UTC+8	Elsadany 70'	Report	Nori 66', 88'; Fadilla 89'	Stadium: Bishan Stadium

11 October 2026 2027 Asian Cup qualification	Indonesia	5–0	Singapore	Bishan, Singapore
20:00 UTC+8				Stadium: Bishan Stadium

== Coaching staff ==
As of August 2025

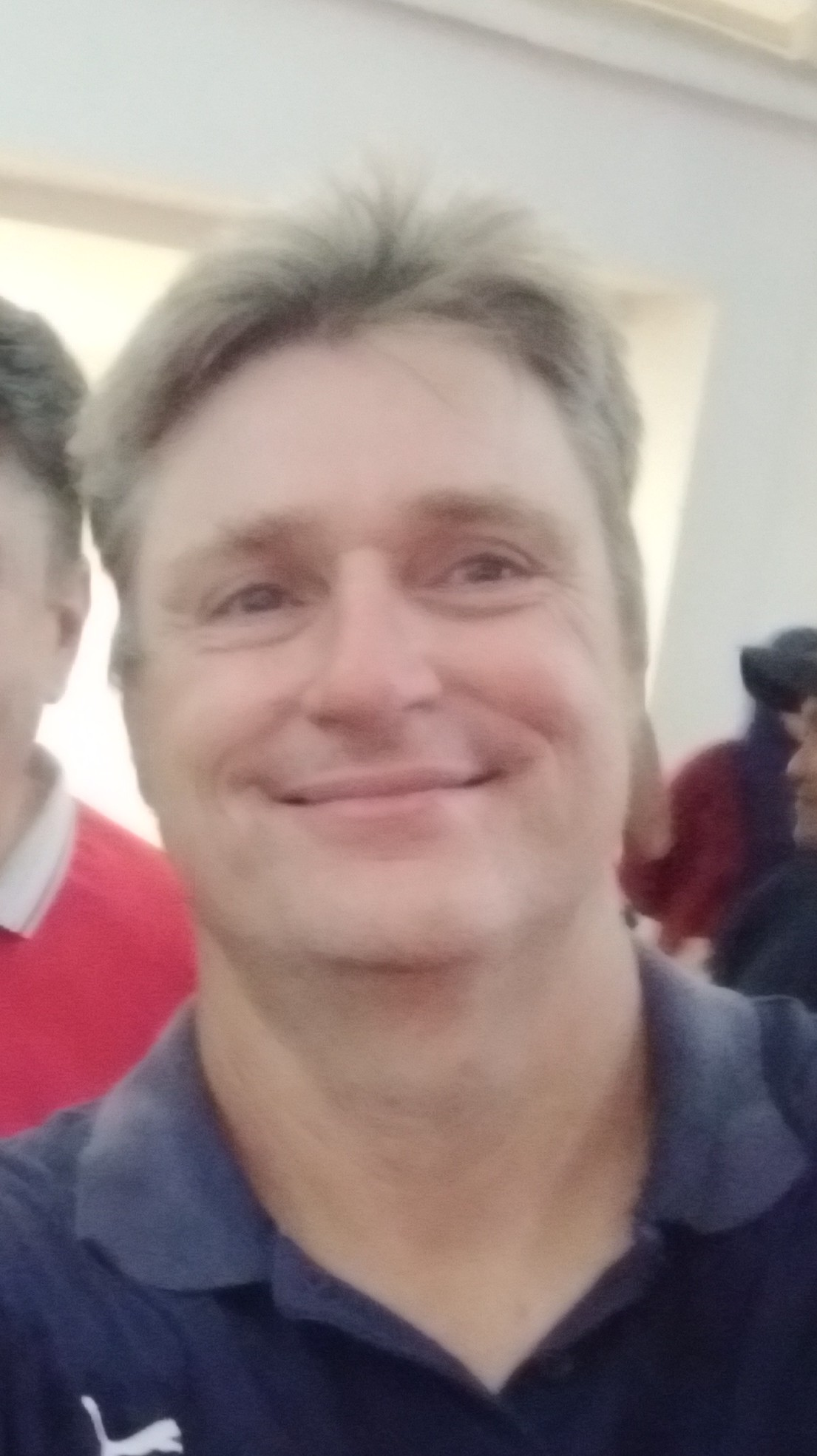
Timo Scheunemann, the head coach of the Indonesia women's national under-17 football team

Position	Name
Head coach	Timo Scheunemann
Assistant coaches	Heri
Assistant coaches	Dian Nadia Mutiara
Assistant coaches	Maya Susmita
Goalkeeping coach	Ferdiansyah
Fitness coaches	Ryo Ikehara
Fitness coaches	Shojiro Ida
Fitness coaches	Gaselly Jun Panam
Analysts	Ichiro Wada
Analysts	Octavery Krisnandana
Doctors	Kihiro Ikeda
Doctors	Takanori Teraoka
Doctors	Leksolie Lirodon Foes
Physiotherapists	Ester Lita Maratade
Physiotherapists	Lulu Indah Prawira
Interpreter	Shuichiro Hara
Team manager	Galih Dimuntur Kartasasmita

== Competitive record ==
=== FIFA U-17 Women's World Cup ===
FIFA U-17 Women's World Cup record
Host/Year	Result	Position	Pld	W	D	L	GF	GA
(New Zealand) 2008	Did not qualify							
(Trinidad and Tobago) 2010	Did not qualify							
(Azerbaijan) 2012	Did not qualify							
(Costa Rica) 2014	Did not qualify							
(Jordan) 2016	Did not qualify							
(Uruguay) 2018	Did not qualify							
(India) 2022	Did not qualify							
(Dominican Republic) 2024	Did not qualify							
(Morocco) 2025	Did not qualify							
(Morocco) 2026	Did not qualify							
Total	–	0/9	0	0	0	0	0	0

=== AFC U-17 Women's Asian Cup ===
AFC U-17 Women's Asian Cup record
Host/Year	Result	Position	Pld	W	D	L	GF	GA
(South Korea) 2005	Group stage	10th	3	0	0	3	0	32
(Malaysia) 2007	Did not enter							
(Thailand) 2009	Did not enter							
(China) 2011	Did not enter							
(China) 2013	Did not enter							
(China) 2015	Did not enter							
(Thailand) 2017	Did not enter							
(Thailand) 2019	Did not qualify							
(Indonesia) 2024	Group stage	8th	3	0	0	3	1	27
(China) 2026	Did not qualify							
(China) 2027	Qualified							
Total	Best: Group stage	2/9	6	0	0	6	1	59

AFC U-17 Women's Asian Cup history
Year	Round	Score	Result
2005	Group stage	South Korea 15–0 Indonesia	Loss
2005	Group stage	Indonesia 0–11 Thailand	Loss
2005	Group stage	India 6–0 Indonesia	Loss
2024	Group stage	Indonesia 1–6 Philippines	Loss
2024	Group stage	South Korea 12–0 Indonesia	Loss
2024	Group stage	Indonesia 0–9 North Korea	Loss

== See also ==
- Indonesia women's national football team
- Indonesia women's national under-20 football team
