= 2028 AFC U-17 Women's Asian Cup =

Tournament details
- Host country: China
- Dates: 20 April–7 May 2028
- Teams: 12 (from 1 confederation)

The 2028 AFC U-17 Women's Asian Cup will be the 12th edition of the AFC U-17 Women's Asian Cup (including previous editions of the AFC U-17 Women's Championship and AFC U-16 Women's Championship), the annual international youth football championship organised by the Asian Football Confederation (AFC) for the women's under-17 national teams of Asia. It will be the last of three consecutive AFC U-17 Women's Asian Cup hosted in China (also in Suzhou), following the 2026 and 2027 tournament.

It will be held in China between 20 April–7 May 2028. A total of twelve teams will compete in the tournament.

The top four teams of the tournament will qualify for the 2028 FIFA U-17 Women's World Cup in Morocco as the AFC representatives.

== Qualification ==
Starting in 2028, only the host country will gain automatic qualification, while the top three teams from the previous tournament (2027) will have to enter the qualification phase. Qualification for the Finals will be organized through the regional qualifying tournaments. Following the meeting of the AFC Women's Football Committee on 20 March 2026, the approved slot allocation are as follows:

- Host - 1 team (China)
- AFF (ASEAN) - 4 teams
- CAFA (Central Asia) - 1 team
- EAFF (East Asia) - 4 teams
- SAFF (South Asia) - 1 team
- WAFF (West Asia) - 1 team

=== Qualified teams ===
The following teams qualified for the tournament.

| Team | Qualified as | Appearance | Previous best performance |
|---|---|---|---|
| China | Host | 12th | Runners-up (2005) |
| TBD | AFF qualifier 1 | | |
| TBD | AFF qualifier 2 | | |
| TBD | AFF qualifier 3 | | |
| TBD | AFF qualifier 4 | | |
| TBD | CAFA qualifier | | |
| TBD | EAFF qualifier 1 | | |
| TBD | EAFF qualifier 2 | | |
| TBD | EAFF qualifier 3 | | |
| TBD | EAFF qualifier 4 | | |
| TBD | SAFF qualifier | | |
| TBD | WAFF qualifier | | |

== Venues ==
The tournament will be held in Suzhou.

== Qualified teams for FIFA U-17 Women's World Cup ==
The following four teams from AFC qualify for the 2028 FIFA U-17 Women's World Cup.

| Team | Qualified on | Previous appearances in FIFA U-17 Women's World Cup^{1} |
|---|---|---|
| TBD | May 2028 | |
| TBD | May 2028 | |
| TBD | May 2028 | |
| TBD | May 2028 | |

^{1} Bold indicates champions for that year. Italic indicates hosts for that year.
