= Thailand women's national under-17 football team =

Thailand U-17
- Association: FA Thailand
- Confederation: AFC (Asia)
- Sub-confederation: AFF (Southeast Asia)
- Head coach: Thidarat Wiwasukhu
- FIFA code: THA
First colours	Second colours	Third colours

Asian Cup
- Appearances: 7 (first in 2005)
- Best result: Third Place (2005)

Thailand women's national under-17 football team is a Thailand women's association football youth team for women soccer player aged under 17 or 16.

== Results and fixtures ==
Win Draw Lose

=== 2026 ===
15 August 2026 Srikandi Merdeka Cup 2026 GS	Thailand	2–0	PUTRI NUSANTARA	Kudus, Indonesia
10:00 UTC+7		Report		Stadium: Supersoccer Arena

17 August 2026 Srikandi Merdeka Cup 2026 GS	Jordan	0–2	Thailand	Kudus, Indonesia
15:00 UTC+7		Report		Stadium: Supersoccer Arena

19 August 2026 Srikandi Merdeka Cup 2026 GS	Thailand	6–0	Singapore	Kudus, Indonesia
10:00 UTC+7		Report		Stadium: Supersoccer Arena

21 August 2026 Srikandi Merdeka Cup 2026 SF	Thailand	5–1	Malaysia	Kudus, Indonesia
15:00 UTC+7		Report		Stadium: Supersoccer Arena

23 August 2026 Srikandi Merdeka Cup 2026 F	Thailand	1–0	Indonesia	Kudus, Indonesia
15:00 UTC+7				Stadium: Supersoccer Arena

5 October 2026 2027 Asian Cup qualification	Thailand	4–0	Bhutan	Chonburi Stadium, Chonburi
19:00 UTC+7	Sunisa 18'; Chanthima 45+1'; Thitirat 90'; Phonnapat 90+4'	Report		Referee: Trần Thị Thanh (Vietnam)

8 October 2026 2027 Asian Cup qualification	Macau	–	Thailand	Chonburi, Thailand
19:00 UTC+7				Stadium: Chonburi Stadium

11 October 2026 2027 Asian Cup qualification	Thailand	–	Lebanon	Chonburi, Thailand
19:00 UTC+7				Stadium: Chonburi Stadium

== Competitive record ==
=== FIFA U-17 Women's World Cup ===
FIFA U-17 Women's World Cup record
Host/Year	Result	Position	Pld	W	D	L	GF	GA
(New Zealand) 2008	Did not qualify							
(Trinidad and Tobago) 2010	Did not qualify							
(Azerbaijan) 2012	Did not qualify							
(Costa Rica) 2014	Did not qualify							
(Jordan) 2016	Did not qualify							
(Uruguay) 2018	Did not qualify							
(India) 2022	Did not qualify							
(Dominican Republic) 2024	Did not qualify							
(Morocco) 2025	Did not qualify							
(Morocco) 2026	Did not qualify							
Total:0/8	TBD	TBD	0	0	0	0	0	0

=== AFC U-17 Women's Asian Cup ===
AFC U-17 Women's Asian Cup record
Year	Round	GP	W	D	L	GF	GA
(South Korea) 2005	Third Place	5	3	0	2	27	14
(Malaysia) 2007	Group Stage	2	0	0	2	2	9
(Thailand) 2009	Group Stage	3	1	0	2	4	15
(China) 2011	Group Stage	5	0	0	5	0	33
(China) 2013	Fourth Place	4	1	1	2	7	10
(China) 2015	Fourth Place	5	2	0	3	5	21
(Thailand) 2017	Group Stage	3	1	0	2	4	9
(Thailand) 2019	Group Stage	3	1	0	2	2	14
(Indonesia) 2024	Group Stage	3	1	0	2	3	8
(China) 2026	Quarter-finals	4	1	1	2	3	14
(China) 2027	Qualified						
Total:10/10	Third Place	37	11	2	24	57	147

=== ASEAN U-16 Women's Championship ===
ASEAN U-16 Women's Championship record
Year	Round	GP	W	D	L	GF	GA
(Myanmar) 2009	Runners-up	5	3	1	1	35	8
(Laos) 2017	Champions	6	6	0	0	24	2
(Indonesia) 2018	Champions	5	4	1	0	10	1
(Thailand) 2019	Champions	6	4	1	1	23	5
(Indonesia) 2025	Runners-up	4	3	0	1	11	4
Total	Best: Champions	26	20	3	3	103	20

== See also ==
- Thailand women's national football team
- Thailand women's national under-20 football team
