= 2009 AFF U-16 Women's Championship =

Tournament details
- Host country: Myanmar
- City: Yangon
- Dates: 9–18 October
- Teams: 8
- Venues: 2 (in 1 host city)

Final positions
- Champions: Australia (1st title)
- Runners-up: Thailand
- Third place: Vietnam
- Fourth place: Myanmar

Tournament statistics
- Matches played: 16
- Goals scored: 122 (7.63 per match)

The 2009 AFF U-16 Women's Championship was held from 9 to 18 October 2009, hosted by Myanmar. All games were played at the Thuwunna Stadium and Aung San Stadium. It was the first tournament held for this age bracket amongst the group of annual AFF Women's Championship events.

== Tournament ==
- All times are Myanmar Standard Time – UTC+6:30.

=== Group stage ===
==== Group A ====
Team	Pld	W	D	L	GF	GA	GD	Pts
Thailand	3	2	1	0	32	0	+32	7
Myanmar A	3	2	1	0	23	0	+23	7
Malaysia	3	1	0	2	2	33	−31	3
Indonesia	3	0	0	3	1	25	−24	0

9 October 2009
15:30

Malaysia	0–15	Myanmar A

Thuwunna Stadium, Yangon
9 October 2009
18:00

Thailand	15–0	Indonesia

Thuwunna Stadium, Yangon

11 October 2009
15:30

Myanmar A	0–0	Thailand

Aung San Stadium, Yangon
11 October 2009
18:00

Indonesia	1–2	Malaysia

Aung San Stadium, Yangon

13 October 2009
16:00

Myanmar A	8–0	Indonesia

Thuwunna Stadium, Yangon
13 October 2009
16:00

Malaysia	0–17	Thailand

Thuwunna Stadium, Yangon

==== Group B ====
Team	Pld	W	D	L	GF	GA	GD	Pts
Australia	3	3	0	0	31	0	+31	9
Vietnam	3	2	0	1	16	5	+11	6
Myanmar B	3	1	0	2	5	18	−13	3
Philippines	3	0	0	3	1	30	−29	0

10 October 2009
15:30

Vietnam	5–0	Myanmar B

Aung San Stadium, Yangon
10 October 2009
18:00

Philippines	0–14	Australia

Aung San Stadium, Yangon

12 October 2009
15:30

Myanmar B	5–1	Philippines

Thuwunna Stadium, Yangon
12 October 2009
18:00

Australia	5–0	Vietnam

Thuwunna Stadium, Yangon

14 October 2009
15:30

Myanmar B	0–12	Australia

Thuwunna Stadium, Yangon
14 October 2009
18:00

Vietnam	11–0	Philippines

Thuwunna Stadium, Yangon

=== Knockout stage ===
==== Bracket ====
Semi-finals
16 October – Yangon
Thailand	3
Vietnam	0
16 October – Yangon
Australia	6
Myanmar A	1

Final
18 October – Yangon
Thailand	0
Australia	8
Third place
18 October – Yangon
Vietnam	3
Myanmar A	0

==== Semi-finals ====
16 October 2009
15:30

Thailand	3–0	Vietnam

Thuwunna Stadium, Yangon
16 October 2009
18:00

Australia	6–1	Myanmar A

Thuwunna Stadium, Yangon

==== Third place play-off ====
18 October 2009
15:30

Vietnam	3–0	Myanmar A
	Report

Thuwunna Stadium, Yangon

==== Final ====
18 October 2009
18:00

Thailand	0–8	Australia
	Report	Whitfield 45+2'; Foord 65', 90'; Kerr 67', 83'; Makrillos 75'; Allen 88' van Egmond 90+2'

Thuwunna Stadium, Yangon

== Awards ==
Thailand won the fair-play award.
