= Lao Football Federation =

Governing body of association football in Laos

AFC
- Founded: 1951; 75 years ago
- Headquarters: Vientiane
- FIFA affiliation: 1952
- AFC affiliation: 1968
- President: Viphet Sihachakr
- Website: http://www.laoff.org.la/

The Lao Football Federation is the governing body of association football in Laos.

== Roster ==
| Name | Position | Source |
|---|---|---|
| (Laos) Viphet Sihachakr | President | |
| (Laos) Kanya Keomany | Senior vice president | |
| (Laos) Pasatxay Philaphandeth | 2nd vice president | |
| (Laos) Khampheng Vongkhanty | 3rd vice president | |
| (Laos) Khamphay Paseuth | 4th vice president | |
| (Laos) Chanthavong Sirimanotham | General secretary | |
| (Laos) Somsanouk Liensavanh | Treasurer | |
| (Singapore) Varadaraju Sundramoorthy | Technical director | |
| (Japan) Nayuha Toyoda | Team coach (women's) | |
| (Serbia) Vladica Grujic | Team coach (men's) | |
| (Laos) Anoulack Chanthavisouk | Media/Communications manager | |
| (Laos) Sysaveuy Saysanasy | Futsal coordinator | |
| (Laos) Khamsing Xayavongsy | Head/Director of the referees department | |
| (Laos) Souei Vongkham | Referee coordinator | |

=== Presidents ===
- (Laos) Phouvanh Vongsouthi (2008–2010)

== Leagues ==
=== Women's ===
- Lao Women's League

=== Men's ===
- Lao League 1
- Lao League 2
