= Myanmar women's national under-17 football team =

National under-17 association football team representing Myanmar

Myanmar women's U-17
- Association: Myanmar Football Federation
- Confederation: AFC (Asia)
- FIFA code: MYA
First colours	Second colours

AFC U-17 Women's Asian Cup
- Appearances: 1 (first in 2009)
- Best result: Group stage (2009)

ASEAN U-16 Women's Championship
- Appearances: 5 (first in 2009)
- Best result: Runners-up (2018)

Myanmar women's national under-17 football team is a national association football youth team of Myanmar and is controlled by the Myanmar Football Federation.

== Competitive record ==
=== FIFA U-17 Women's World Cup ===
- (New Zealand) 2008 = Did not Participate
- (Trinidad and Tobago) 2010 to (Morocco) 2026 = Did not qualify

=== AFC U-17 Women's Asian Cup ===
AFC U-17 Women's Asian Cup record
Year	Round	GP	W	D	L	GF	GA
(South Korea) 2005	Did not enter						
(Malaysia) 2007	Did not enter						
(Thailand) 2009	Group stage	3	0	0	3	2	19
(China) 2011	Did not qualify						
(China) 2013	Did not qualify						
(China) 2015	Did not qualify						
(Thailand) 2017	Did not qualify						
(Thailand) 2019	Did not qualify						
(Indonesia) 2024	Did not qualify						
(China) 2026	Group Stage	3	0	0	3	1	9
(China) 2027	Qualified						
Total: 2/10	Group stage	6	0	0	6	3	28

=== AFF U-15 Women's Championship ===
- (Myanmar) 2009 = Fourth Place
- (Laos) 2017 = Third Place
- (Indonesia) 2018 = Runner's Up
- (Thailand) 2019 = Group Stage

=== Myanmar ===
Head coach: (Japan) Kumiko Tashiro

Myanmar announced their final squad.

No.	Pos.	Player	Date of birth (age)	Caps	Goals	Club
1	GK	Saung Pwint Phyu	6 June 2011 (aged 14)			(Myanmar Football Federation) Young Lionesses
2	DF	Thae Ei Hlaing	18 June 2009 (aged 16)			(Myanmar Football Federation) Ayeyawady
3	FW	Chit Pwint Aung	1 December 2009 (aged 16)			(Myanmar Football Federation) Young Lionesses
4	FW	Myat Moe San	21 April 2011 (aged 15)			(Myanmar Football Federation) Young Lionesses
5	FW	Win Yupar	4 January 2011 (aged 15)			(Myanmar Football Federation) Young Lionesses
6	DF	Pin Myint Yan	10 January 2009 (aged 17)			(Myanmar Football Federation) Young Lionesses
7	MF	Min Htone May Zitar	28 September 2009 (aged 16)			(Myanmar Football Federation) Ayeyawady
8	MF	San San Htwe	21 August 2011 (aged 14)			(Myanmar Football Federation) Young Lionesses
9	FW	Saung Thazin Oo	5 September 2010 (aged 15)			(Myanmar Football Federation) Young Lionesses
10	FW	Shin Thant Phyu Sin Pyone	6 June 2010 (aged 15)			(Myanmar Football Federation) Ayeyawady
11	FW	Yee Yee Phyo	27 December 2010 (aged 15)			(Myanmar Football Federation) Young Lionesses
12	MF	Hnin Wint War Kyaw	21 March 2009 (aged 17)			(Myanmar Football Federation) Young Lionesses
13	FW	Khin Myat Bhone Htut	7 February 2011 (aged 15)			(Myanmar Football Federation) Young Lionesses
14	DF	Pyae Paing Hmue Eain	21 January 2010 (aged 16)			(Myanmar Football Federation) Young Lionesses
15	DF	Thaw Dar Hnin	12 September 2009 (aged 16)			(Myanmar Football Federation) Young Lionesses
16	FW	L L Sai Hwal Nan	3 February 2009 (aged 17)			(Myanmar Football Federation) Ayeyawady
17	MF	May Thinzar	29 June 2009 (aged 16)			(Myanmar Football Federation) Young Lionesses
18	GK	Aye Wathan Toe	10 January 2010 (aged 16)			(Myanmar Football Federation) Young Lionesses
19	MF	Honey Phoo Wai	18 April 2010 (aged 16)			(Myanmar Football Federation) Young Lionesses
20	MF	Nang Khaing Zin Myint	8 February 2009 (aged 17)			(Myanmar Football Federation) Ayeyawady
21	MF	Thet Thet Wai	8 March 2011 (aged 15)			(Myanmar Football Federation) Young Lionesses
22	GK	Kyawt Kay Khine	11 October 2010 (aged 15)			(Myanmar Football Federation) Young Lionesses
23	FW	Ingyin May	18 May 2010 (aged 15)			(Myanmar Football Federation) Young Lionesses

== Honours ==
=== AFF Competitions ===
- AFF U16 Girls' Championship
  - Runners-up (1): 2018
  - Third Place (1): 2017

=== Invitation ===
- Vietnam International U15 Girls' Football Tournament
  - Runners-up (1): 2019
