= 2024 AFC U-17 Women's Asian Cup qualification =

Tournament details
- Host countries: First round: Thailand (Group A); Mongolia (Group B); Vietnam (Group C); Singapore (Group D); Tajikistan (Group E); Kyrgyzstan (Group F); Guam (Group G); Jordan (Group H); Second round: Thailand (Group A); Vietnam (Group B)
- Dates: First round: 22–30 April 2023; Second round: 19–24 September 2023
- Teams: 24 (from 1 confederation)

Tournament statistics
- Matches played: 36
- Goals scored: 195 (5.42 per match)
- Top scorer(s): (South Korea) Won Ju-eun (8 goals)

The 2024 AFC U-17 Women's Asian Cup qualification was the qualification process organized by the Asian Football Confederation (AFC) to determine the participating teams for the 2024 AFC U-17 Women's Asian Cup, the 9th edition of the international women's under-17 football championship of Asia. Therefore, players born on or after 1 January 2007 were eligible to participate.

A total of eight teams qualified to play in the final tournament in Indonesia. The host country Indonesia and the top three teams of the previous tournament (Japan, North Korea and China) qualified automatically, while the other four teams were decided by qualification, with the matches played between 22 and 30 April 2023 (first round) and 19–24 September 2023 (second round) in centralised venues.

This tournament also served as the first stage of Asian qualification for the 2024 FIFA U-17 Women's World Cup, where three teams from the U-17 Women's Asian Cup qualify directly for the World Cup.

== Teams ==
The 42 AFC member associations were eligible to enter the qualification after Indonesia plus the top three teams of the previous tournament (Japan, North Korea and China) automatically qualified for the final tournament and Sri Lanka was barred from participating in international competitions due to FIFA suspension after the draw. The Northern Mariana Islands, whose association are not FIFA members, were not be eligible to qualify for the 2024 FIFA U-17 Women's World Cup.

Only 24 teams including Turkmenistan who did not participate in the previous edition, entered the competition. The final host Indonesia initially decided to also participate in the qualifying competition but withdrew after the draw. 18 teams including Bahrain, Bhutan, Iraq and United Arab Emirates who withdrew after the draw plus Laos, Pakistan and Syria who did participate in the previous edition, did not enter to the qualification and were listed below. The following teams with asterisks are the teams never entered the qualification.

- Afghanistan*
- Bahrain (withdrew after the draw)
- Bhutan* (withdrew after the draw)
- Brunei*
- Cambodia*
- Iraq (withdrew after the draw)
- Kuwait*
- Laos
- Macau*
- Maldives*
- Oman*
- Pakistan
- Qatar*
- Saudi Arabia*
- Sri Lanka (suspended after the draw)
- Syria*
- Timor-Leste
- UAE (withdrew after the draw)
- Yemen*

=== First draw ===
The draw for the first round was held on 3 November 2022 at the AFC House in Kuala Lumpur, Malaysia.

29 teams including Bahrain, Bhutan, Iraq plus United Arab Emirates who withdrew after the draw and Indonesia who automatically qualified as hosts but withdrew from participation after the draw, were seeded into four pots based on their performance at the qualification and the final tournament of the previous edition. The eight hosts of the qualification were placed into the host pots.

==== Seeding ====
Teams who participated in the final tournament of the previous edition were ranked from the 1st to the 8th by their performance at that tournament and other teams who participated in the qualification of the previous edition were ranked from the 9th to 28th by their performance at that tournament. Bahrain, Bhutan, Indonesia, Iraq, Turkmenistan and United Arab Emirates who did not participate in the previous edition, were unranked.

Final rankings

Pos	Team	Pld	W	D	L	GF	GA	GD	Pts	Final results
1	Japan	5	4	1	0	21	1	+20	13	Champions
2	North Korea	5	4	0	1	21	2	+19	12	Runners-up
3	China	5	3	0	2	5	7	−2	9	Third place
4	Australia	5	1	2	2	9	8	+1	5	Fourth place
5	South Korea	3	1	0	2	3	5	−2	3	Eliminated in group stage (Note: Teams are ranked in descending order as follows: position in the group stage, points, goal difference, goals scored and disciplinary points in all group matches and drawing of lots.)
6	Thailand	3	1	0	2	2	14	−12	3	Eliminated in group stage
7	Bangladesh	3	0	1	2	2	12	−10	1	Eliminated in group stage
8	Vietnam	3	0	0	3	0	14	−14	0	Eliminated in group stage

Source: AFC

Qualification rankings

Pos	Team	Pld	W	D	L	GF	GA	GD	Pts	Final results
1	China	7	7	0	0	69	0	+69	21	Qualify for final tournament (Note: Teams are ranked in descending order as follows: position in the second round group, points in same number of second round group matches among the teams with same second round group position, goal difference in same number of second round group matches among the teams with same second round group position, goals scored in same number of second round group matches among the teams with same second round group position, disciplinary points in same number of second round group matches among the teams with same second round group position and the procedure used same as the teams eliminated in the first round.)
2	Australia	7	7	0	0	46	0	+46	21	Qualify for final tournament
3	Bangladesh	7	6	0	1	38	3	+35	18	Qualify for final tournament
4	Vietnam	7	4	1	2	26	3	+23	13	Qualify for final tournament
5	Laos	7	4	1	2	13	6	+7	13	Eliminated in qualification second round
6	**Myanmar**	6	4	0	2	22	8	+14	12	Eliminated in qualification second round
7	**Iran**	7	4	1	2	28	9	+19	13	Eliminated in qualification second round
8	**Philippines**	6	2	0	4	6	25	−19	6	Eliminated in qualification second round
9	Thailand	4	4	0	0	25	1	+24	12	
10	**Chinese Taipei**	4	3	0	1	13	9	+4	9	Eliminated in qualification first round
11	**India**	4	2	1	1	12	4	+8	7	Eliminated in qualification first round
12	**Jordan**	4	2	1	1	16	9	+7	7	Eliminated in qualification first round

Source: AFC

==== Pots ====
The 29 teams including Bahrain, Bhutan, Iraq plus United Arab Emirates who withdrew after the draw and Indonesia who automatically qualified as hosts but withdrew from participation after the draw, were drawn into five groups of four teams and three groups of three teams.

Bye to the final tournament
1. Japan
2. North Korea
3. China
4. Indonesia (final tournament hosts)

Teams entering the qualification first round
	Pot 1	Pot 2	Pot 3	Pot 4
Host teams	7. **Thailand** **(H)**; 9. **Vietnam** **(H)**	15. Jordan **(H)**; 17. Singapore **(H)**	21. Mongolia **(H)**; 24. Kyrgyzstan **(H)**; 25. Tajikistan **(H)**; 26. Guam **(H)**	
Remaining teams	5. **Australia**; 6. **South Korea**; 8. **Bangladesh**; 10. Myanmar; 11. **Iran**; 12. **Philippines**	13. Chinese Taipei; 14. **India**; 16. Uzbekistan; 18. Hong Kong; 19. Lebanon; 20. Malaysia	22. Nepal; 23. UAE **(W)**; 27. Palestine; 28. NMI	29. Bahrain **(W)**; 29. Bhutan **(W)**; 29. Iraq **(W)**; 29. Turkmenistan

Notes

- Teams in **bold** advanced to the qualification second round.
- (H): Qualification first round group hosts.
- (Q): Final tournament hosts, automatically qualified for the final tournament regardless of qualification results.
- (W): Withdrew after the draw.

== Player eligibility ==
Players born between 1 January 2007 and 31 December 2009 are eligible to compete in the tournament.

== Format ==
In each group, teams played each other once at a centralised venue.

- In the first round, the eight group winners advanced to the second round. However, the final tournament hosts Indonesia did not advance to the second round. Their matches were not taken into account when calculating the group ranking.
- In the second round, the two group winners and the two group runners-up qualified for the final tournament to join the four automatically qualified teams.

=== Tiebreakers ===
Teams were ranked according to points (3 points for a win, 1 point for a draw, 0 points for a loss), and if tied on points, the following tiebreaking criteria were applied: (Regulations Article 7.3):

1. Points in head-to-head matches among tied teams;
2. Goal difference in head-to-head matches among tied teams;
3. Goals scored in head-to-head matches among tied teams;
4. If more than two teams are tied, and after applying all head-to-head criteria above, a subset of teams are still tied, all head-to-head criteria above are reapplied exclusively to this subset of teams;
5. Goal difference in all group matches;
6. Goals scored in all group matches;
7. Penalty shoot-out if only two teams are tied and they met in the last round of the group;
8. Disciplinary points (yellow card = 1 point, red card as a result of two yellow cards = 3 points, direct red card = 3 points, yellow card followed by direct red card = 4 points);
9. Drawing of lots.

== First round ==
The first round was played from 22 to 30 April 2023.

=== Group A ===
- All matches were held in Thailand.
- Times listed are UTC+7.

Pos	Team	Pld	W	D	L	GF	GA	GD	Pts	Qualification
1	Thailand (H)	2	2	0	0	22	0	+22	6	Second round
2	Malaysia	2	1	0	1	5	12	−7	3	
3	Northern Mariana Islands	2	0	0	2	1	16	−15	0	

Rules for classification: Qualification tiebreakers
(H) Hosts
26 April 2023
18:00

Northern Mariana Islands	0–11	Thailand
	Report	Chirarak 7'; Rinyaphat 14', 40', 44', 81'; Sasi 17', 24', 45+2', 56'; Matika 74'; Aunchidtha 90+3'

Buriram City Stadium, Buriram
Referee: Cha Min-ji (South Korea)

28 April 2023
18:00

Malaysia	5–1	Northern Mariana Islands
Lole 11', 35', 81', 84'; Adlin 89'	Report	A. Chavez 29'

Buriram City Stadium, Buriram
Referee: Choki Om (Bhutan)

30 April 2023
18:00

Thailand	11–0	Malaysia
Rinyaphat 7'; Chirarak 11', 58'; Prichakorn 16', 19', 47'; Achiraya 39'; Madison 49'; Pinyaphat 65', 74'; Phatcharaphorn 84'	Report

Buriram City Stadium, Buriram
Referee: Rebecca Durcau (Australia)

=== Group B ===
- All matches were held in Mongolia.
- Times listed are UTC+8.

Pos	Team	Pld	W	D	L	GF	GA	GD	Pts	Qualification
1	Australia	2	2	0	0	14	0	+14	6	Second round
2	Chinese Taipei	2	1	0	1	3	3	0	3	
3	Mongolia (H)	2	0	0	2	0	14	−14	0	
4	Bhutan	0	0	0	0	0	0	0	0	Withdrew

Rules for classification: Qualification tiebreakers
(H) Hosts
24 April 2023
15:00

Mongolia	0–11	Australia
	Report	Groidis 1'; Kuilamu 19'; Younis 24'; Meyers 45+1', 87'; McMahon 45+2'; Fuller 49', 69' (pen.), 83', 90+4'; Kiceec 89'

MFF Football Centre, Ulaanbaatar
Referee: Supiree Testhomya (Thailand)

26 April 2023
15:00

Chinese Taipei	3–0	Mongolia
Wu Ya-yu 40' (pen.); Chen Yu-chin 55'; Chuan Tzu-yu 72'	Report

MFF Football Centre, Ulaanbaatar
Referee: Esra'a Al-Mbaidin (Jordan)

28 April 2023
15:00

Australia	3–0	Chinese Taipei
Brooking 26'; Williams 58' (pen.); Dale 90+3'	Report

MFF Football Centre, Ulaanbaatar
Referee: Asaka Koizumi (Japan)

=== Group C ===
- All matches were held in Vietnam.
- Times listed are UTC+7.

Pos	Team	Pld	W	D	L	GF	GA	GD	Pts	Qualification
1	Vietnam (H)	2	2	0	0	8	0	+8	6	Second round
2	Uzbekistan	2	1	0	1	2	4	−2	3	
3	Palestine	2	0	0	2	1	7	−6	0	
4	Bahrain	0	0	0	0	0	0	0	0	Withdrew

Rules for classification: Qualification tiebreakers
(H) Hosts
22 April 2023
16:00

Palestine	0–5	Vietnam
	Report	Đỗ Thị Thúy Nga 10'; Đậu Nguyễn Quỳnh Anh 36'; Nguyễn Thu Trang 39'; Nguyễn Ngô Thảo Nguyên 53'; Nguyễn Thị Quỳnh Anh 60'

Vietnam YFTC Field No. 3, Hanoi
Referee: Thein Thein Aye (Myanmar)

24 April 2023
16:00

Uzbekistan	2–1	Palestine
Aminjonova 7'; Egamberdieva 26'	Report	Khoury 45+3'

Vietnam YFTC Field No. 3, Hanoi
Referee: Haneen Murad (Jordan)

26 April 2023
16:00

Vietnam	3–0	Uzbekistan
Ngân Thị Thanh Hiếu 10'; Trương Thị Hoài Trinh 72'; Nguyễn Thị Thương 76'	Report

Vietnam YFTC Field No. 3, Hanoi
Referee: Pansa Chaisanit (Thailand)

=== Group D ===
- All matches were held in Singapore.
- Times listed are UTC+8.

Pos	Team	Pld	W	D	L	GF	GA	GD	Pts	Qualification
1	Bangladesh	2	2	0	0	9	0	+9	6	Second round
2	Singapore (H)	2	1	0	1	7	3	+4	3	
3	Turkmenistan	2	0	0	2	0	13	−13	0	
4	United Arab Emirates	0	0	0	0	0	0	0	0	Withdrew

Rules for classification: Qualification tiebreakers
(H) Hosts
26 April 2023
20:00

Turkmenistan	0–6	Bangladesh
	Report	P. Das 2'; Rita 5'; Ru. Akter 38'; T. Marma 52'; Prity 60' (pen.); Rani 82' (pen.)

Jalan Besar Stadium, Kallang
Referee: Doumouh Al Bakkar (Lebanon)

28 April 2023
20:00

Singapore	7–0	Turkmenistan
Ayu 10'; Ying 28', 60'; Nahwah 62', 83'; Chang 64', 90+3'	Report

Jalan Besar Stadium, Kallang
Referee: Jhesa Kaatz (Philippines)

30 April 2023
20:00

Bangladesh	3–0	Singapore
Prity 21' (pen.), 55' (pen.); S. Akter 63'	Report

Jalan Besar Stadium, Kallang
Referee: Park Se-jin (South Korea)

=== Group E ===
- All matches were held in Tajikistan.
- Times listed are UTC+5.

Pos	Team	Pld	W	D	L	GF	GA	GD	Pts	Qualification
1	South Korea	2	2	0	0	28	0	+28	6	Second round
2	Hong Kong	2	1	0	1	3	12	−9	3	
3	Tajikistan (H)	2	0	0	2	0	19	−19	0	
4	Iraq	0	0	0	0	0	0	0	0	Withdrew

Rules for classification: Qualification tiebreakers
(H) Hosts
26 April 2023
18:00

Tajikistan	0–16	South Korea
	Report	Phair 8', 22'; Seo Min-jeong 11'; Won Ju-eun 15', 25', 42' (pen.), 43'; Kwon Da-eun 21'; Kim Ye-eun 48', 59', 84'; Beom Ye-ju 51'; Park Ga-yun 66'; Kim Hyo-won 82', 87'; Jang Ye-rin 90+3' (pen.)

Hisor Central Stadium, Hisor
Referee: Sunita Thongthawin (Thailand)

28 April 2023
18:00

Hong Kong	3–0	Tajikistan
Wong Hiu Ting 18'; Ko 55', 89'	Report

Hisor Central Stadium, Hisor
Referee: Tian Jin (China)

30 April 2023
18:00

South Korea	12–0	Hong Kong
Seo Min-jeong 3', 40'; Phair 8', 14', 64'; Lee Ha-eun 18'; Jang Ye-yun 47'; Kwon Da-eun 55', 66', 87'; Beom Ye-ju 58'; Ji Ae 83'	Report

Hisor Central Stadium, Hisor
Referee: Yang Shu-ting (Chinese Taipei)

=== Group F ===
- All matches were held in Kyrgyzstan.
- Times listed are UTC+6.

Pos	Team	Pld	W	D	L	GF	GA	GD	Pts	Qualification
1	India	2	2	0	0	3	1	+2	6	Second round
2	Myanmar	2	1	0	1	2	2	0	3	
3	Kyrgyzstan (H)	2	0	0	2	0	2	−2	0	

Rules for classification: Qualification tiebreakers
(H) Hosts
24 April 2023
20:00

Kyrgyzstan	0–1	Myanmar
	Report	Yu Ya Naing 4'

Dolen Omurzakov Stadium, Bishkek
Referee: Anjana Rai (Nepal)

26 April 2023
20:00

India	1–0	Kyrgyzstan
Nongmeikapam 77'	Report

Dolen Omurzakov Stadium, Bishkek
Referee: Saltanat Noroozi (Iran)

28 April 2023
20:00

Myanmar	1–2	India
Ya Min Phyu 76'	Report	Raul 27'; Pooja 33'

Dolen Omurzakov Stadium, Bishkek
Referee: Bùi Thị Thu Trang (Vietnam)

=== Group G ===
- All matches were held in Guam.
- Times listed are UTC+10.

Pos	Team	Pld	W	D	L	GF	GA	GD	Pts	Qualification
1	Philippines	2	2	0	0	5	1	+4	6	Second round
2	Lebanon	2	1	0	1	5	4	+1	3	
3	Guam (H)	2	0	0	2	3	8	−5	0	

Rules for classification: Qualification tiebreakers
(H) Hosts
22 April 2023
19:00

Guam	1–3	Philippines
Kukahiko 71'	Report	Mathelus 29', 47', 76'

GFA National Training Center, Dededo
Referee: Haruna Kanematsu (Japan)

24 April 2023
19:00

Lebanon	5–2	Guam
Iskandar 2'; Bitar 21'; Hariri 35'; Hamdar 56'; Karam 59'	Report	San Nicolas 6'; Wusstig 52'

GFA National Training Center, Dededo
Referee: Wang Chi-eh (Chinese Taipei)

26 April 2023
19:00

Philippines	2–0	Lebanon
Alamo 68'; Mathelus 90' (pen.)	Report

GFA National Training Center, Dededo
Referee: Lara Lee (Australia)

=== Group H ===
- All matches were held in Jordan.
- Times listed are UTC+3.

Pos	Team	Pld	W	D	L	GF	GA	GD	Pts	Qualification
1	Iran	2	2	0	0	8	1	+7	6	Second round
2	Nepal	2	1	0	1	4	2	+2	3	
3	Jordan (H)	2	0	0	2	2	11	−9	0	

Rules for classification: Qualification tiebreakers
(H) Hosts
26 April 2023
16:00

Nepal	0–1	Iran
	Report	Kooh Gard 81'

Prince Mohammed Stadium, Zarqa
Referee: Công Thị Dung (Vietnam)

28 April 2023
16:00

Jordan	1–4	Nepal
Al Saheli 90+3'	Report	B. Oli 13'; Miya 32', 55'; Maske 44' (pen.)

Prince Mohammed Stadium, Zarqa
Referee: Khuloud Al Zaabi (United Arab Emirates)

30 April 2023
16:00

Iran	7–1	Jordan
Ghajarian 14' (pen.); Bahmani 24'; Awadallah 35' (o.g.); Dini 40', 81'; Khoshgoo 76'; Kooh Gard 88'	Report	Batayneh 45+1'

Prince Mohammed Stadium, Zarqa
Referee: Dong Fangyu (China)

== Second round ==
The draw for the second round of the qualifiers was held on 18 May 2023. Eight teams were drawn into two groups of four teams, seeded according to their performance in the 2019 AFC U-16 Women's Championship final tournament and qualification.

Participating in qualification second round
Pot 1	Pot 2	Pot 3	Pot 4
1. **Australia** (4); 2. **South Korea** (5)	3. **Thailand** (6) **(H)**; 4. Bangladesh (7)	5. Vietnam (8) **(H)**; 6. Iran (10)	7. **Philippines** (11); 8. India (13)

Notes

- Teams in **bold** qualified for the final tournament.
- (H): Qualification second round group hosts

The second round was played between 19 and 24 September 2023.

=== Group A ===
- All matches were held in Thailand.
- Times listed are UTC+7:00.

Pos	Team	Pld	W	D	L	GF	GA	GD	Pts	Qualification
1	South Korea	3	3	0	0	23	2	+21	**9**	Final tournament
2	Thailand (H)	3	2	0	1	12	7	+5	**6**	Final tournament
3	India	3	1	0	2	3	12	−9	**3**	
4	Iran	3	0	0	3	0	17	−17	**0**	

Rules for classification: Qualification tiebreakers
(H) Hosts
19 September 2023
16:30

South Korea	8–0	India
Park Ju-ha 13'; Won Ju-eun 28' (pen.), 47', 65'; Han Guk-hee 76'; Toppo 83' (o.g.); Seo Min-jeong 84', 89'	Report

Buriram City Stadium, Buriram
Referee: Roziyabonu Yusupova (Uzbekistan)
19 September 2023
20:30

Thailand	6–0	Iran
Rinyaphat 7' (pen.); Phatcharaphorn 8', 22'; Pinyaphat 64'; Pattharatida 69'; Chirarak 90+2'	Report

Buriram City Stadium, Buriram
Referee: Sabreen Al A'badi (Jordan)

21 September 2023
16:30

Iran	0–8	South Korea
	Report	Won Ju-eun 7' (pen.); Kwon Da-eun 32'; Han Guk-hee 45', 76'; Mina Babouyeh 50' (o.g.); Kim Ye-eun 70'; Park Ju-ha 74'; Seo Min-jeong 87'

Buriram City Stadium, Buriram
Referee: Rebecca Durcau (Australia)
21 September 2023
20:30

India	0–4	Thailand
	Report	Rinyaphat 17' (pen.); Julaiporn 19'; Madison 23' (pen.), 71'

Buriram City Stadium, Buriram

23 September 2023
16:30

Iran	0–3	India
	Report	Raul 37', 44', 88'

Buriram City Stadium, Buriram
23 September 2023
20:30

South Korea	7–2	Thailand
Park Ju-ha 6'; Beom Ye-ju 27', 50', 71'; Seo Min-jeong 56' (pen.); Ryoo Ji-hae 60' (pen.); Kwon Da-eun 75'	Report	Chirarak 13'; Madison 77'

Buriram City Stadium, Buriram

=== Group B ===
- All matches were held in Vietnam.
- Times listed are UTC+7:00.

Pos	Team	Pld	W	D	L	GF	GA	GD	Pts	Qualification
1	Australia	3	3	0	0	12	3	+9	**9**	Final tournament
2	Philippines	3	2	0	1	6	7	−1	**6**	Final tournament
3	Vietnam (H)	3	1	0	2	3	3	0	**3**	
4	Bangladesh	3	0	0	3	1	9	−8	**0**	

Rules for classification: Qualification tiebreakers
(H) Hosts
20 September 2023
16:00

Australia	6–2	Philippines
Kuilamu 30'; Cuthbert 42'; McMahon 46'; Skelly 55'; Younis 75'; Duong 86' (pen.)	Report	Mathelus 14' (pen.), 17'

Vietnam Youth Football Training Center, Hanoi
Referee: Mahsa Ghorbani (Iran)
20 September 2023
19:00

Bangladesh	0–2	Vietnam
	Report	Nguyễn Ngô Thảo Nguyên 41'; Ngân Thị Thanh Hiếu 64'

Vietnam Youth Football Training Center, Hanoi

22 September 2023
16:00

Philippines	3–1	Bangladesh
Preston 3'; Mathelus 32'; Soon 90+5'	Report	Sagorika 4'

Vietnam Youth Football Training Center, Hanoi
22 September 2023
19:00

Vietnam	1–2	Australia
Ngân Thị Thanh Hiếu 28'	Report	Dale 41', 45'

Vietnam Youth Football Training Center, Hanoi

24 September 2023
16:00

Australia	4–0	Bangladesh
Dale 2', 57', 61', 74'

Vietnam Youth Football Training Center, Hanoi
24 September 2023
19:00

Vietnam	0–1	Philippines
		Preston 56'

Vietnam Youth Football Training Center, Hanoi

== Qualified teams ==
The following eight teams qualified for the final tournament.

Team	Qualified as	Qualified on	Previous appearances in AFC U-17 Women's Asian Cup^{1}
Indonesia	Hosts	5 July 2021	1 (2005)
Japan	2019 champions	5 July 2021	8 (**2005**, 2007, 2009, **2011**, **2013**, 2015, 2017, **2019**)
North Korea	2019 runners-up	5 July 2021	7 (**2007**, 2009, 2011, 2013, **2015**, **2017**, 2019)
China	2019 third place	5 July 2021	8 (2005, 2007, 2009, 2011, 2013, 2015, 2017, 2019)
South Korea	Second round Group A winners	21 September 2023	8 (2005, 2007, **2009**, 2011, 2013, 2015, 2017, 2019)
Thailand	Second round Group A runners-up	21 September 2023	8 (2005, 2007, 2009, 2011, 2013, 2015, 2017, 2019)
Australia	Second round Group B winners	22 September 2023	6 (2007, 2009, 2011, 2013, 2017, 2019)
Philippines	Second round Group B runners-up	24 September 2023	0 (debut)

^{1} Bold indicates champions for that year. Italic indicates hosts for that year.

== Goalscorers ==
There have been 195 goals scored in 36 matches, for an average of 5.42 goals per match (as of 24 September 2023).

8 goals

- (South Korea) Won Ju-eun

7 goals

- (Australia) Sienna Dale
- (Philippines) Nina Mathelus
- (South Korea) Seo Min-jeong
- (Thailand) Rinyaphat Moondong

6 goals

- (South Korea) Kwon Da-eun

5 goals

- (South Korea) Casey Phair
- (South Korea) Beom Ye-ju
- (Thailand) Chirarak Khamtan

4 goals

- (Australia) Tiana Fuller
- (India) Sulanjana Raul
- (Malaysia) Rocillyeka Lole
- (South Korea) Kim Ye-eun
- (Thailand) Sasi Lekphetr
- (Thailand) Madison Casteen

3 goals

- (Bangladesh) Sauravi Akanda Prity
- (South Korea) Han Guk-hee
- (South Korea) Park Ju-ha
- (Thailand) Prichakorn Kruechuenchom
- (Thailand) Phatcharaphorn Khuchuea
- (Thailand) Pinyaphat Klinklai
- (Vietnam) Ngân Thị Thanh Hiếu

2 goals

- (Australia) Grace Kuilamu
- (Australia) Shelby McMahon
- (Australia) Kiera Meyers
- (Australia) Talia Younis
- (Hong Kong) Lucia Ko
- (Iran) Maryam Dini
- (Iran) Arisa Kooh Gard
- (Nepal) Sukriya Miya
- (Philippines) Isabella Preston
- (Singapore) Cara Chang
- (Singapore) Chloe Ying
- (Singapore) Nahwah Mohammed
- (South Korea) Kim Hyo-won
- (Vietnam) Nguyễn Ngô Thảo Nguyên

1 goal

- (Australia) Ischia Brooking
- (Australia) Ruby Cuthbert
- (Australia) Mikayla Duong
- (Australia) Georgia Groidis
- (Australia) Christina Kiceec
- (Australia) Lillian Skelly
- (Australia) Shayla Williams
- (Bangladesh) Ruma Akter
- (Bangladesh) Sultana Akter
- (Bangladesh) Puja Das
- (Bangladesh) Thuinuye Marma
- (Bangladesh) Trishna Rani
- (Bangladesh) Joynob Bibi Rita
- (Bangladesh) Mst. Sagorika
- (Guam) Melia Kukahiko
- (Guam) Hinengi San Nicolas
- (Guam) Serenity Wusstig
- (Hong Kong) Wong Hiu Ting
- (India) Sibani Devi Nongmeikapam
- (India) Pooja
- (Iran) Arina Bahmani
- (Iran) Asal Ghajarian
- (Iran) Parnia Khoshgoo
- (Jordan) Arwa Batayneh
- (Jordan) Lylia Al Saheli
- (Lebanon) Celine Bitar
- (Lebanon) Yasmine Hamdar
- (Lebanon) Elissa Hariri
- (Lebanon) Cecile Iskandar
- (Lebanon) Paula Karam
- (Malaysia) Adlin Bandi
- (Myanmar) Ya Min Phyu
- (Myanmar) Yu Ya Naing
- (Nepal) Maya Maske
- (Nepal) Barsha Oli
- (Northern Mariana Islands) Andrei Chavez
- (Palestine) Leen Khoury
- (Philippines) Isabella Alamo
- (Philippines) Jelena Soon
- (Singapore) Ayu Natasha
- (South Korea) Jang Ye-rin
- (South Korea) Jang Ye-yun
- (South Korea) Ji Ae
- (South Korea) Lee Ha-eun
- (South Korea) Park Ga-yun
- (South Korea) Ryoo Ji-hae
- (Thailand) Aunchidtha Homtago
- (Thailand) Pattharatida Saenglaeb
- (Thailand) Matika Thaprik
- (Thailand) Achiraya Yingsakul
- (Thailand) Julaiporn Jaimulwong
- (Chinese Taipei) Chen Yu-chin
- (Chinese Taipei) Chuan Tzu-yu
- (Chinese Taipei) Wu Ya-yu
- (Uzbekistan) Asalkhon Aminjonova
- (Uzbekistan) Mehribon Egamberdieva
- (Vietnam) Đậu Nguyễn Quỳnh Anh
- (Vietnam) Đỗ Thị Thúy Nga
- (Vietnam) Nguyễn Thu Trang
- (Vietnam) Nguyễn Thị Quỳnh Anh
- (Vietnam) Nguyễn Thị Thương
- (Vietnam) Trương Thị Hoài Trinh

1 own goal

- (Jordan) Maya Awadallah (against Iran)
- (India) Shivani Toppo (against South Korea)
- (Iran) Mina Babouyeh (against South Korea)

== See also ==
- 2024 AFC U-20 Women's Asian Cup qualification
- 2024 AFC Women's Olympic Qualifying Tournament
- 2024 AFC U-23 Asian Cup qualification
