= 2013 AFC U-16 Women's Championship qualification =

Tournament details
- Dates: 7 November – 30 November 2012
- Teams: 11 (from 1 confederation)

The 2013 AFC U-16 Women's Championship qualification is the qualification stage of 2013 AFC U-16 Women's Championship. The first matches were played on 6 November 2012.

== Format ==
There is only one qualification round. Teams are divided into four regional groups. After playing each other once the group winners and second placed teams qualify for final tournament.

If two or more teams are equal on points on completion of the group matches, the following criteria were applied to determine the rankings.

1. Greater number of points obtained in the group matches between the teams concerned;
2. Goal difference resulting from the group matches between the teams concerned;
3. Greater number of goals scored in the group matches between the teams concerned;
4. Goal difference in all the group matches;
5. Greater number of goals scored in all the group matches;
6. Kicks from the penalty mark if only two teams are involved and they are both on the field of play;
7. Fewer score calculated according to the number of yellow and red cards received in the group matches;
8. Drawing of lots.

== Results ==
=== Group A ===
- All matches are held in Amman, Jordan (UTC+2).

Team	Pld	W	D	L	GF	GA	GD	Pts
Jordan	2	2	0	0	13	0	+9	6
Bahrain	2	1	0	1	1	4	–3	3
Palestine	2	0	0	2	0	10	–10	0

† Kuwait pulled out of the AFC U16 qualifiers.

7 November 2012
17:00

Palestine	0 – 9	Jordan
	Report	Al-Hayeek 14', 63'; Lanaber 35', 38'; Al-Oqaily 49'; Isleem 53', 57', 68'; Amer 56'

Petra Stadium, Amman, Jordan
Attendance: 850
Referee: Maria Piedade Rebello (India)

9 November 2012
17:00

Bahrain	1 – 0	Palestine
Il Alhadwa 4' (o.g.)	Report

Petra Stadium, Amman, Jordan
Attendance: 150
Referee: Shiva Yari (I.R. Iran)

11 November 2012
17:00

Jordan	4 – 0	Bahrain
Lanaber 40'; Al-Hayeek 50'; Isleem 79', 88'	Report

Petra Stadium, Amman, Jordan
Attendance: 350
Referee: Pannipar Kamneung (Thailand)

=== Group B ===
- All matches are held in Colombo, Sri Lanka (UTC+5:30).

Team	Pld	W	D	L	GF	GA	GD	Pts
Uzbekistan	3	2	1	0	10	1	+9	7
Iran	3	2	0	1	8	5	+3	6
India	3	0	2	1	4	7	–3	2
Sri Lanka	3	0	1	2	1	10	–9	1

26 November 2012
11:00

Sri Lanka	0 – 6	Uzbekistan
	Report	Ergasheva 16'; Radjabova 35'; Kudratova 46', 90+2'; Nozimova 51'; Zoirova 82'

City Football Complex, Colombo, Sri Lanka
Attendance: 500
Referee: Mai Hoang Trang (Vietnam)
26 November 2012
15:00

Iran	5 – 2	India
Banaei 11', 59'; Ahmadizadeh 6', 51'; Aminehborazjani 87'	Report	Fernandes 22', 84'

City Football Complex, Colombo, Sri Lanka
Attendance: 100
Referee: Li Juan (China P.R.)

28 November 2012
11:00

Uzbekistan	3 – 0	Iran
Nozimova 6', 42'; Kudratova 83'	Report

City Football Complex, Colombo, Sri Lanka
Attendance: 50
Referee: Thein Thein Aye (Myanmar)
28 November 2012
15:00

India	1 – 1	Sri Lanka
Colaco 2'	Report	Dissanayake 90+2'

City Football Complex, Colombo, Sri Lanka
Attendance: 250
Referee: Cong Thi Dung (Vietnam)

30 November 2012
11:00

India	1 – 1	Uzbekistan
Fernandes 45'	Report	Ergasheva 85'

City Football Complex, Colombo, Sri Lanka
Attendance: 75
Referee: Cong Thi Dung (Vietnam)
30 November 2012
15:00

Sri Lanka	0 – 3	Iran
	Report	Gharehbeglou 34'; Geraeli 54'; Aminehborazjani 90+2'

City Football Complex, Colombo, Sri Lanka
Attendance: 500
Referee: Li Juan (China P.R.)

=== Group C ===
- All matches are held in Manila, Philippines (UTC+8).

Team	Pld	W	D	L	GF	GA	GD	Pts
Australia	3	3	0	0	18	2	+16	9
Thailand	3	2	0	1	10	8	+2	6
Myanmar	3	1	0	2	4	9	–5	3
Philippines	3	0	0	3	3	16	–13	0

7 November 2012
15:00

Australia	5 – 1	Thailand
Cantrill 3'; Franco 37'; Gavin 44', 82'; Methawi 65' (o.g.)	Report	Sudarat 19'

Rizal Memorial Stadium, Manila
Attendance: 300
Referee: Qin Liang (China)
7 November 2012
18:00

Philippines	1 – 2	Myanmar
Arthur 89'	Report	Zin Hnin 50'; Hnin Thwe 59'

Rizal Memorial Stadium, Manila
Attendance: 800
Referee: Mai Hoang Trang (Vietnam)

9 November 2012
15:00

Myanmar	0 – 5	Australia
	Report	Dalton 35'; Waterhouse 40'; Franco 45', 89'; Kirby 79'

Rizal Memorial Stadium, Manila
Attendance: 300
Referee: Saltanat Noroozi (I.R. Iran)
9 November 2012
18:00

Thailand	6 – 1	Philippines
Sojirat 6', 13', 80'; Sudarat 35'; Tuangporn 38'; Passanan 86'	Report	Adriano 24'

Rizal Memorial Stadium, Manila
Attendance: 500
Referee: Ri Hyang Ok (Korea DPR)

11 November 2012
15:00

Thailand	3 – 2	Myanmar
Sangrawee 12'; Sandar 57' (o.g.); Sudarat 60' (pen.)	Report	Htwe 3'; Hnin 71'

Rizal Memorial Stadium, Manila
Attendance: 200
Referee: Qin Liang (China)
11 November 2012
18:00

Philippines	1 – 8	Australia
Arthur 24'	Report	Kirby 10'; MacQueen 12'; Waterhouse 20'; Cantrill 26', 63', 73'; Palozzi 33', 84'

Rizal Memorial Stadium, Manila
Attendance: 500
Referee: Ri Hyang Ok (Korea DPR)

=== Group D ===
- All matches are held in Guam (UTC+10).

Team	Pld	W	D	L	GF	GA	GD	Pts
Chinese Taipei	2	2	0	0	16	0	+16	6
Guam	2	1	0	1	1	9	–8	3
Hong Kong	2	0	0	2	0	8	–8	0

6 November 2012
16:30

Hong Kong	0 – 1	Guam
	Report	Iriarte 67'

Guam FA Field, Guam
Attendance: 380
Referee: Praew Semaksuk (Thailand)

8 November 2012
16:00

Chinese Taipei	7 – 0	Hong Kong
Chia-Ling 11'; Ching-Hui 20'; Chia-Hui 25', 41'; Chuan-Ting 31'; Mei-Huan 85'; Shih-Chuan 87'	Report

Guam FA Field, Guam
Attendance: 90
Referee: Li Juan (China PR)

10 November 2012
16:00

Guam	0 – 9	Chinese Taipei
	Report	Chuan-Ting 1'; Chia-Hui 12', 15', 58'; Shin-Yu 40', 45', 82'; Yi-Yun 56', 69'

Guam FA Field, Guam
Attendance: 300
Referee: Nami Sato (Japan)
