= 2027 AFC U-17 Women's Asian Cup qualification =

International football tournament

Tournament details
- Host countries: Tajikistan (Group A); Singapore (Group B); Laos (Group C); Vietnam (Group D); Malaysia (Group E); Thailand (Group F); Myanmar (Group G); Uzbekistan (Group H)
- Dates: 5–11 October 2026
- Teams: 30 (from 1 confederation)

Tournament statistics
- Matches played: 39
- Goals scored: 231 (5.92 per match)
- Top scorer(s): (India) Anushka Kumari (South Korea) Kim Hee-jin (8 goals each)

The 2027 AFC U-17 Women's Asian Cup qualification was the qualification process organized by the Asian Football Confederation (AFC) to determine the participating teams for the 2027 AFC U-17 Women's Asian Cup, the 11th edition of the international women's under-17 football championship of Asia. Therefore, players born on or after 1 January 2010 were eligible to participate.

A total of twelve teams qualified to play in the final tournament in China. The host country China and the top three teams of the previous tournament (North Korea, Japan and Australia) in 2026 qualified automatically, while the other eight teams were decided by qualification, with the matches played between 5 and 11 October 2026.

== Draw ==
Of the 47 Asian Football Confederation (AFC) member associations, a total of 30 teams entered the competition. The top four teams from the last edition, including the hosts China who qualified for the 2026 FIFA U-17 Women's World Cup, automatically qualified for the final tournament.

The draw was held on 16 July 2026, 15:00 MYT (UTC+8), at the AFC House in Kuala Lumpur, Malaysia.

The 30 teams were allocated to six groups of four teams and two groups of three teams, with teams seeded based on a points system derived from their final rankings across the previous three editions (overall ranking shown in parentheses). A further restriction was also applied, with the eight teams serving as qualification group hosts drawn into separate groups.

Bye to the final tournament
1. **North Korea**
2. **Japan**
3. **China** (final tournament hosts)
4. **Australia**

Teams entering the qualification round
Pot 1	Pot 2	Pot 3	Pot 4
1. **South Korea** (1); 2. **Thailand** (2) **(H)**; 3. **Vietnam** (3) **(H)**; 4. **Philippines** (4); 5. **India** (5); 6. **Chinese Taipei** (6); 7. **Indonesia** (7); 8. **Myanmar** (8) **(H)**	9. Lebanon (9); 10. Iran (10) **(W)**; 11. Singapore (11) **(H)**; 12. Hong Kong (12); 13. Bangladesh (13); 14. Kyrgyzstan (14); 15. Malaysia (15) **(H)**; 16. Jordan (16)	17. Uzbekistan (17) **(H)**; 18. Northern Mariana Islands (18); 19. Saudi Arabia (19); 20. Guam (20); 21. Laos (21) **(H)**; 22. Syria (22); 23. Tajikistan (23) **(H)**; 24. Macau (24)	25. Palestine (25); 26. United Arab Emirates (26); 27. Bahrain (27); 28. Bhutan (28); 29. Cambodia (28); 30. Iraq (28)

Notes

- Teams in **bold** advanced to the final tournament.
- (H): Qualification group hosts.
- (W): Withdrew after draw.

Did not enter

- Afghanistan
- Brunei
- Kuwait
- Maldives
- Mongolia
- Nepal
- Oman
- Pakistan
- Qatar
- Sri Lanka
- Timor-Leste
- Turkmenistan
- Yemen

== Groups ==
=== Group A ===
- All matches were held in Tajikistan.
- Times listed are UTC+5.

Pos	Team	Pld	W	D	L	GF	GA	GD	Pts	Qualification
1	South Korea	3	3	0	0	31	0	+31	9	Final tournament
2	Tajikistan (H)	3	1	1	1	6	7	−1	4	
3	Jordan	3	1	1	1	7	10	−3	4	
4	United Arab Emirates	3	0	0	3	0	27	−27	0	

Source: AFC
Rules for classification: Qualification tiebreakers
(H) Hosts
5 October 2026
15:00

South Korea	16–0	United Arab Emirates
Ban Hyo-rin 6'; Park Ye-sol 8'; Kim Hee-jin 16', 17', 30', 70', 77', 83', 89'; Ko Ji-eun 25', 74', 75', 87'; Song Chae-hee 57', 68'; Kwon Hyo-ri 60'	Report

TALCO Arena, Tursonzoda
Referee: Pansa Chaisanit (Thailand)
5 October 2026
20:00

Jordan	1–1	Tajikistan
Dweik 69'	Report	Abdikarimova 80'

TALCO Arena, Tursonzoda
Referee: Keomany Phengmeuangkhoun (Laos)

8 October 2026
15:00

United Arab Emirates	0–6	Jordan
	Report	Haqrous 21', 35'; Dweik 47', 80', 87'; Abu-Helweh 13'

TALCO Arena, Tursonzoda
Referee: Ranjita Devi Tekcham (India)
8 October 2026
20:00

Tajikistan	0–6	South Korea
	Report	Kwon Hyo-ri 15', 42'; Kim Hee-jin 16'; Ochildieva 25' (o.g.); Park Na-young 55'; Ko Ji-eun 82'

TALCO Arena, Tursonzoda
Referee: Wang Yuran (China)

11 October 2026
15:00

South Korea	9–0	Jordan
Shin So-eun 11', 40'; Lim Ji-hye 22'; Cho An 28', 57', 80'; Choi Min-seo 60'; Park Na-young 67'; Kwon Hyo-ri 77'	Report

TALCO Arena, Tursonzoda
Referee: Wang Yuran (China)
11 October 2026
20:00

Tajikistan	5–0	United Arab Emirates
Husainova 17', 56', 70', 74'; Nurova 90+5'	Report

TALCO Arena, Tursonzoda
Referee: Gulshoda Saitkulova (Uzbekistan)

=== Group B ===
- All matches were held in Singapore.
- Times listed are UTC+8.

Pos	Team	Pld	W	D	L	GF	GA	GD	Pts	Qualification
1	Indonesia	3	3	0	0	10	1	+9	9	Final tournament
2	Singapore (H)	3	2	0	1	5	5	0	6	
3	Saudi Arabia	3	1	0	2	3	5	−2	3	
4	Bahrain	3	0	0	3	1	8	−7	0	

Source: AFC
Rules for classification: Qualification tiebreakers
(H) Hosts
5 October 2026
17:00

Indonesia	2–0	Bahrain
Arabela 19', 21'	Report

Bishan Stadium, Singapore
Referee: Yu Hong (China)
5 October 2026
20:00

Singapore	1–0	Saudi Arabia
Tan 23'	Report

Bishan Stadium, Singapore
Referee: Wang Chieh (Chinese Taipei)

8 October 2026
17:00

Saudi Arabia	1–3	Indonesia
El-Sadany 70'	Report	Nori 66', 88'; Fadilla 89'

Bishan Stadium, Singapore
Referee: Plong Pich Akara (Cambodia)
8 October 2026
20:00

Bahrain	0–4	Singapore
	Report	Tan 16', 67'; Lim 42'; Loo 85'

Bishan Stadium, Singapore
Referee: Salma Akter Mone (Bangladesh)

11 October 2026
17:00

Saudi Arabia	2–1	Bahrain
Al-Sharaf 51'; Al-Otaibi 88'	Report	Mohamed 66'

Bishan Stadium, Singapore
Referee: Mahnaz Zokaee (Iran)
11 October 2026
20:00

Indonesia	5–0	Singapore
Febri 5'; Fadilla 10', 14'; Arabela 42'; Ayla 83'	Report

Bishan Stadium, Singapore
Referee: Plong Pich Akara (Cambodia)

=== Group C ===
- All matches were held in Laos.
- Times listed are UTC+7.

Pos	Team	Pld	W	D	L	GF	GA	GD	Pts	Qualification
1	Chinese Taipei	2	2	0	0	18	0	+18	6	Final tournament
2	Laos (H)	2	1	0	1	3	7	−4	3	
3	Cambodia	2	0	0	2	1	15	−14	0	
4	Iran	0	0	0	0	0	0	0	0	Withdrew

Source: AFC
Rules for classification: Qualification tiebreakers
(H) Hosts
5 October 2026
18:00

Cambodia	0–12	Chinese Taipei
	Report	Lin Zi-xun 4'; Chang Yu-hsin 11', 13', 54', 74', 76', 79'; Chang Yi-hsuan 24'; Yang Yi-ai 35'; Ho Serena Vera 48', 71'; Chung Yun-chien 90+1'

New Laos National Stadium, Vientiane
Referee: Jon Sol-mi (North Korea)

8 October 2026
18:00

Laos	3–1	Cambodia
Anna 26', 68'; Phonsavan 47'	Report	Roeun 77'

New Laos National Stadium, Vientiane
Referee: Mu Mingxin (China)

11 October 2026
18:00

Chinese Taipei	6–0	Laos
Ho Serena Vera 4', 10'; Lu Cai-xuan 24', 87'; Chang Yu-hsin 42'; Yang Yi-ai 57'	Report

New Laos National Stadium, Vientiane
Referee: Rebecca Mackie (Australia)

=== Group D ===
- All matches were held in Vietnam.
- Times listed are UTC+7.

Pos	Team	Pld	W	D	L	GF	GA	GD	Pts	Qualification
1	Vietnam (H)	3	3	0	0	28	0	+28	9	Final tournament
2	Kyrgyzstan	3	2	0	1	20	3	+17	6	
3	Palestine	3	1	0	2	9	8	+1	3	
4	Northern Mariana Islands	3	0	0	3	0	46	−46	0	

Source: AFC
Rules for classification: Qualification tiebreakers
(H) Hosts
5 October 2026
15:00

Kyrgyzstan	18–0	Northern Mariana Islands
Flores 3', 31' (o.g.); Iliasova 10', 37'; Asanbekova 28'; Razakbaeva 33', 38', 63'; Zairbekova 41', 42', 50', 81'; George 48' (o.g.); Cholponbekova 51', 62', 77'; Ishembieva 71'; Sabyrbekova 75'	Report

Bà Rịa Stadium, Ho Chi Minh City
Referee: Sunita Thongthawin (Thailand)
5 October 2026
18:00

Vietnam	6–0	Palestine
Nguyễn Lê Khánh Đan 32', 47'; Đỗ Thị Hà Vi 39'; Nguyễn Thị Ngọc Ánh 42', 69'; Phan Thị Thu Phương 90'	Report

Bà Rịa Stadium, Ho Chi Minh City
Referee: Yang Shu-ting (Chinese Taipei)

8 October 2026
15:00

Palestine	1–2	Kyrgyzstan
Abu-Sarhan 11'	Report	Zairbekova 44'; Bakytbekova 67'

Bà Rịa Stadium, Ho Chi Minh City
Referee: Roziyabonu Yusupova (Uzbekistan)
8 October 2026
18:00

Northern Mariana Islands	0–20	Vietnam
	Report	Trương Khánh Chi 1', 12', 18', 46', 70', 74'; Nguyễn Quỳnh Lâm 3', 26', 71'; Phan Thị Thu Phương 16', 84'; Nguyễn Thị Ngọc Ánh 21', 57'; Trương Yến Linh 44'; Đỗ Thị Hà Vi 45+3', 84', 89'; Hà Yến Nhi 59'; Nguyễn Thị Thủy 88'; Phạm Hà My 90'

Bà Rịa Stadium, Ho Chi Minh City
Referee: Esra'a Al-Mbaidin (Jordan)

11 October 2026
15:00

Northern Mariana Islands	0–8	Palestine
	Report	Abu-Sarhan 4', 16', 71'; Asad 12'; Ghneim 21' (pen.), 40'; Phillips 59'; Balousha 87'

Bà Rịa Stadium, Ho Chi Minh City
Referee: Omura Kotomi (Japan)
11 October 2026
18:00

Vietnam	2–0	Kyrgyzstan
Nguyễn Thị Huyền Trang 25'; Đỗ Thị Hà Vi 55'	Report

Bà Rịa Stadium, Ho Chi Minh City
Referee: Roziyabonu Yusupova (Uzbekistan)

=== Group E ===
- All matches were held in Malaysia.
- Times listed are UTC+8.

Pos	Team	Pld	W	D	L	GF	GA	GD	Pts	Qualification
1	India	3	3	0	0	20	0	+20	9	Final tournament
2	Malaysia (H)	3	2	0	1	5	4	+1	6	
3	Syria	3	1	0	2	1	3	−2	3	
4	Iraq	3	0	0	3	0	19	−19	0	

Source: AFC
Rules for classification: Qualification tiebreakers
(H) Hosts
5 October 2026
15:30

India	14–0	Iraq
A. Kumari 9', 12', 39', 47', 71'; Baskey 14'; Sorokhaibam 21', 30'; Longjam 42'; Barman 49'; Basnett 70', 86'; Hasan 78'; Senjam 90+3'	Report

MP Selayang Stadium, Selayang
Referee: Lê Thị Ly (Vietnam)
5 October 2026
21:00

Malaysia	1–0	Syria
Qaseh Riana 80'	Report

MP Selayang Stadium, Selayang
Referee: Hanine Merhi (Lebanon)

8 October 2026
15:30

Syria	0–2	India
	Report	A. Kumari 5', 55'

MP Selayang Stadium, Selayang
Referee: Supiree Testhomya (Thailand)
8 October 2026
21:00

Iraq	0–4	Malaysia
	Report	Aisyah 19'; Qaseh Riana 45+'; Lim You 58'; Aisha 85'

MP Selayang Stadium, Selayang
Referee: Natalia Sotnikova (Tajikistan)

11 October 2026
15:30

Syria	1–0	Iraq
Ato 53'	Report

MP Selayang Stadium, Selayang
Referee: Wong Joki Christie (Hong Kong)
11 October 2026
21:00

India	4–0	Malaysia
Chingkhamayum 28'; Barman 50'; A. Kumari 56'; Kumar 86'	Report

MP Selayang Stadium, Selayang
Referee: Hanine Merhi (Lebanon)

=== Group F ===
- All matches were held in Thailand.
- Times listed are UTC+7.

Pos	Team	Pld	W	D	L	GF	GA	GD	Pts	Qualification
1	Thailand (H)	3	3	0	0	18	0	+18	9	Final tournament
2	Lebanon	3	2	0	1	11	5	+6	6	
3	Bhutan	3	1	0	2	3	9	−6	3	
4	Macau	3	0	0	3	0	18	−18	0	

Source: AFC
Rules for classification: Qualification tiebreakers
(H) Hosts
5 October 2026
15:00

Lebanon	6–0	Macau
Geitani 5', 66'; Tong Hoi Lam 40' (o.g.); Karnib 63'; Boustany 80'; Hajj 88'	Report

Chonburi Stadium, Chonburi
Referee: Haneen Murad (Jordan)
5 October 2026
19:00

Thailand	4–0	Bhutan
Sunisa 18'; Chanthima 45+1'; Thitirat 90'; Phonnapat 90+4'	Report

Chonburi Stadium, Chonburi
Referee: Trần Thị Thanh (Vietnam)

8 October 2026
15:00

Bhutan	0–5	Lebanon
	Report	Karnib 10', 47'; Geitani 44', 45+2', 50'

Chonburi Stadium, Chonburi
Referee: Fatemeh Nasiri Looshani (Iran)
8 October 2026
19:00

Macau	0–9	Thailand
	Report	Pawitchayada 32', 53', 62', 83'; Murdoch 53'; Paweesuda 67'; Kalyaphat 73'; Nanthiya 77'; Warantorn 89'

Chonburi Stadium, Chonburi
Referee: Pak Un-jong (North Korea)

11 October 2026
15:00

Macau	0–3	Bhutan
	Report	Choden 19'; Choeden 65'; Tshogyel 90+4'

Chonburi Stadium, Chonburi
Referee: Haneen Murad (Jordan)
11 October 2026
19:00

Thailand	5–0	Lebanon
Wanthong 21'; Pawitchayada 34', 45+1'; Murdoch 56'; Nanthiya 65'	Report

Chonburi Stadium, Chonburi
Referee: Khin Nyein Chan (Myanmar)

=== Group G ===
- All matches were held in Myanmar.
- Times listed are UTC+6:30.

Pos	Team	Pld	W	D	L	GF	GA	GD	Pts	Qualification
1	Myanmar (H)	2	2	0	0	11	1	+10	6	Final tournament
2	Hong Kong	2	1	0	1	10	2	+8	3	
3	Guam	2	0	0	2	0	18	−18	0	

Source: AFC
Rules for classification: Qualification tiebreakers
(H) Hosts
5 October 2026
16:00

Guam	0–9	Myanmar
	Report	Win Yupar 30', 51', 53', 71'; Nan Kham Hwan 41'; Honey Phoo Wai 43'; Saung Thazin Oo 58'; Shin Thant Phyu Sin Pyone 60'; Nay Myo Thu Thu Aung 62'

Thuwunna Stadium, Yangon
Referee: Pawarin Chukong (Thailand)

8 October 2026
16:00

Hong Kong	9–0	Guam
Sophia 8', 45'; Cheung Ching Yan 10', 64'; Cheng Siu Ying 34'; Chau Tsz Yuet 42'; Leung Danielle Lok Yu 85'; Chow Pui Kei 89', 90'	Report

Thuwunna Stadium, Yangon
Referee: Park Ye-bin (South Korea)

11 October 2026
16:00

Myanmar	2–1	Hong Kong
Shin Thant Phyu Sin Pyone 41'; Thet Thet Wai 60'	Report	Wong Tsz Yiu 28'

Thuwunna Stadium, Yangon
Referee: Bùi Thị Thu Trang (Vietnam)

=== Group H ===
- All matches were held in Uzbekistan.
- Times listed are UTC+5.

Pos	Team	Pld	W	D	L	GF	GA	GD	Pts	Qualification
1	Philippines	2	2	0	0	7	0	+7	6	Final tournament
2	Bangladesh	2	1	0	1	2	4	−2	3	
3	Uzbekistan (H)	2	0	0	2	1	6	−5	0	

Source: AFC
Rules for classification: Qualification tiebreakers
(H) Hosts
5 October 2026
16:00

Uzbekistan	0–4	Philippines
	Report	Granger 51', 63', 65'; Chheng 68'

Do'stlik Stadium Training Pitch 1, Tashkent
Referee: Tian Jin (China)

8 October 2026
16:00

Bangladesh	2–1	Uzbekistan
Purnima 4'; Runa 90+3'	Report	Lakaeva 17'

Do'stlik Stadium Training Pitch 1, Tashkent
Referee: Elaheh Sinakaei (Iran)

11 October 2026
16:00

Philippines	3–0	Bangladesh
Bascara 73'; Granger 90', 90+2'	Report

Do'stlik Stadium Training Pitch 1, Tashkent
Referee: Nodira Mirzoeva (Tajikistan)

== Qualified teams ==
The following teams qualified for the 2027 AFC U-17 Women's Asian Cup.

Team	Qualified as	Date qualified	Appearance	Previous best performance
China	Hosts	14 April 2025	11th	Runners-up (2005)
North Korea	2026 champions	14 May 2026	10th	Champions (2007, 2015, 2017, 2024, 2026)
Japan	2026 runners-up	14 May 2026	11th	Champions (2005, 2011, 2013, 2019)
Australia	2026 fourth place	14 May 2026	9th	Fourth place (2009, 2019, 2026)
South Korea	Group A winners	11 October 2026	11th	Champions (2009)
Indonesia	Group B winners	11 October 2026	3rd	Group stage (2005, 2024)
Chinese Taipei	Group C winners	11 October 2026	6th	Group stage (2005, 2009, 2013, 2015, 2026)
Vietnam	Group D winners	11 October 2026	3rd	Quarter-finals (2026)
India	Group E winners	11 October 2026	3rd	Quarter-finals (2026)
Thailand	Group F winners	11 October 2026	11th	Third place (2005)
Myanmar	Group G winners	11 October 2026	3rd	Group stage (2009, 2026)
Philippines	Group H winners	11 October 2026	3rd	Group stage (2024, 2026)

== Goalscorers ==
There were 231 goals scored in 39 matches, for an average of 5.92 goals per match.

8 goals

- (South Korea) Kim Hee-jin
- (India) Anushka Kumari

7 goals

- (Chinese Taipei) Chang Yu-hsin

6 goals

- (Thailand) Pawitchayada Yodthawari
- (Vietnam) Trương Khánh Chi

5 goals

- (Philippines) Noelle Granger
- (Vietnam) Đỗ Thị Hà Vi
- (Lebanon) Yara El Gitani
- (Kyrgyzstan) Perizat Zairbekova
- (South Korea) Ko Ji-eun

4 goals

- (Tajikistan) Omina Husainova
- (Chinese Taipei) Ho Serena Vera
- (South Korea) Kwon Hyo-ri
- (Palestine) Reetal Abu-Sarhan
- (Vietnam) Nguyễn Thị Ngọc Ánh
- (Jordan) Yena Dweik
- (Myanmar) Win Yupar

3 goals

- (Indonesia) Tiny Fadilla
- (Indonesia) Kesya Arabela
- (South Korea) Cho An
- (Vietnam) Phan Thị Thu Phương
- (Vietnam) Nguyễn Quỳnh Lâm
- (Singapore) Amelia Tan
- (Lebanon) Sara Karnib
- (Kyrgyzstan) Nuraiym Razakbaeva
- (Kyrgyzstan) Esmina Cholponbekova

2 goals

- (Thailand) Nanthiya Meepho
- (Thailand) Miricah Shealagh Murdoch
- (Chinese Taipei) Yang Yi-ai
- (Chinese Taipei) Lu Cai-Xuan
- (South Korea) Park Na-young
- (South Korea) Shin So-eun
- (Myanmar) Shin Thant Phyu Sin Pyone
- (Palestine) Selina Ghneim
- (Malaysia) Qaseh Riana Dafira Rafiuddin
- (Laos) Anna Keo Onsy
- (Hong Kong) Chow Pui Kei
- (Hong Kong) Sophia Chua
- (Hong Kong) Cheung Ching Yan
- (Indonesia) Nafeeza Ayasha Nori
- (Jordan) Ragad Haqrous
- (Vietnam) Nguyễn Lê Khánh Đan
- (India) Abhista Basnett
- (India) Pritika Barman
- (India) Silky Devi Sorokhaibam
- (Kyrgyzstan) Narselia Iliasova
- (South Korea) Song Chae-hee

1 goal

- (Indonesia) Ayla Dva
- (Indonesia) Febri Arum
- (Bhutan) Kuenden Tshogyel
- (Bhutan) Rinzin Choeden
- (Bhutan) Sonam Choden
- (Syria) Bayan Ato
- (Palestine) Rama Asad
- (Palestine) Violetlina Phillips
- (Palestine) Elena Balousha
- (Bahrain) Aljoory Mohamed
- (Malaysia) Aisha Lynn Faris
- (Malaysia) Lim You
- (Malaysia) Aisyah Nur Iman Fuad
- (Vietnam) Phạm Hà My
- (Vietnam) Nguyễn Thị Thủy
- (Vietnam) Hà Yến Nhi
- (Vietnam) Trương Yến Linh
- (Singapore) Verona Lim
- (Singapore) Kylie Loo
- (Bangladesh) Purnima Marma
- (Bangladesh) Runa Akter
- (Uzbekistan) Larangiz Lakaeva
- (Cambodia) Sreypich Roeun
- (Laos) Phonsavan Sayavong
- (Hong Kong) Chau Tsz Yuet
- (Hong Kong) Cheng Siu Ying
- (Hong Kong) Leung Danielle Lok Yu
- (Hong Kong) Wong Tsz Yiu
- (Kyrgyzstan) Ademi Bakytbekova
- (Kyrgyzstan) Anelia Asanbekova
- (Kyrgyzstan) Zhanara Sabyrbekova
- (Kyrgyzstan) Akak Ishembieva
- (Saudi Arabia) Kenzy El-Sadany
- (Saudi Arabia) Ghaday Al-Otaibi
- (Saudi Arabia) Zaenab Al-Sharaf
- (Jordan) Leen Abuhelweh
- (Tajikistan) Mahinoz Nurova
- (Tajikistan) Dilafruz Abdikarimova
- (Thailand) Sunisa Prathumwan
- (Thailand) Chanthima Taoue
- (Thailand) Thitirat Samrong
- (Thailand) Phonnapat Phapyai
- (Thailand) Warantorn Pongkoksi
- (Thailand) Kalyaphat Muangoon
- (Thailand) Kanokporn Wanthong
- (Thailand) Paweesuda Ouanlam
- (Philippines) Savannah Chheng
- (Philippines) Maya Bascara
- (Chinese Taipei) Lin Zi-xun
- (Chinese Taipei) Chang Yi-hsuan
- (Chinese Taipei) Chung Yun-chien
- (South Korea) Ban Hyo-rin
- (South Korea) Choi Min-seo
- (South Korea) Lim Ji-hye
- (South Korea) Park Ye-sol
- (Myanmar) Nay Myo Thu Thu Aung
- (Myanmar) Saung Thazin Oo
- (Myanmar) Honey Phoo Wai
- (Myanmar) Nan Kham Hwan
- (Myanmar) Thet Thet Wai
- (Lebanon) Acil Hajj
- (Lebanon) Angy Boustany
- (India) Alva Devi Senjam
- (India) Joya Kabul Hasan
- (India) Nidhi Kumar
- (India) Nira Chanu Longjam
- (India) Redima Devi Chingkhamayum
- (India) Thandamoni Baskey

1 own goal

- (Macau) Tong Hoi Lam (against Lebanon)
- (Northern Mariana Islands) Orica George (against Kyrgyzstan)
- (Tajikistan) Sakhzoda Ochildieva (against South Korea)

2 own goals

- (Northern Mariana Islands) Cassidee Flores (against Kyrgyzstan)

== See also ==
- 2026 AFC Women's Asian Cup qualification
- 2026 AFC U-20 Women's Asian Cup qualification
- 2027 AFC U-17 Asian Cup qualification
- 2026 AFC U-23 Asian Cup qualification
