= Nina Mathelus =

Filipino footballer (born 2008)

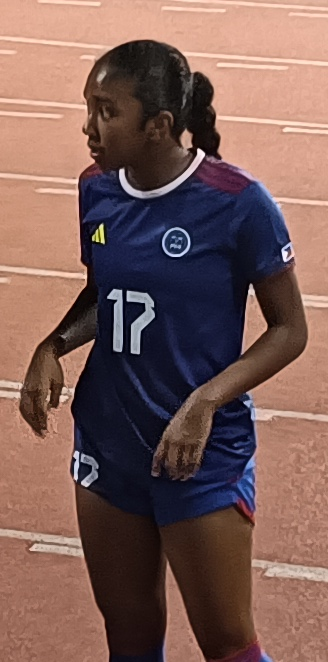
- Mathelus with the Philippines in 2025

Personal information
- Full name: Nina Carmelie Mathelus
- Date of birth: September 12, 2008 (age 18)
- Place of birth: Boston, Massachusetts, U.S.
- Height: 5 ft 7 in (1.70 m)
- Position: Forward

Team information
- Current team: California Golden Bears

Youth career
- Scorpions SC
- South Shore Select
- Thayer Academy Tigers

College career
Years	Team	Apps	(Gls)
2026–	California Golden Bears		

International career^{‡}
2023	Philippines U17	10	(7)
2024–	Philippines	9	(1)
Medal record
Women's football
Representing the Philippines
Southeast Asian Games
Gold medal – first place	2025 Thailand	Team
- ‡ National team caps and goals as of December 5, 2025

Nina Carmelie Mathelus (born September 12, 2008) is a professional footballer who plays as a forward for the California Golden Bears. Born in the United States, she represents the Philippines at international level.

== International career ==
In April 2023, Mathelus made her debut for the Philippines under-17 team in the 2024 AFC U-17 Women's Asian Cup qualifiers. She scored a hat-trick in a 3–1 win over Guam, and added another goal in a 2–0 victory against Lebanon, helping the team advance to the second round. In September 2023, she was named in the squad for the second round held in Vietnam. Mathelus scored a brace in a 6–2 loss to Australia and scored again in a 3–0 win over Bangladesh. She featured in all five matches during the qualifiers as the Philippines secured qualification for the AFC U-17 Women's Asian Cup for the first time in history.

In February 2024, she featured in friendlies against England U-17 and Sweden U-17 at the 2024 MIMA Cup in Spain. She was later named in the final squad for the 2024 AFC U-17 Women's Asian Cup in Bali, Indonesia, where she played in all three group stage matches against Indonesia, North Korea, and South Korea.

Mathelus received her first senior call-up in March 2024 at age 15. She made her senior international debut on April 5, 2024, coming on as a substitute in a 3–0 loss to South Korea. She later joined the squad for the 2024 Pink Ladies Cup, appearing in matches against Jordan and Kenya.

She made her competitive senior debut at the 2026 AFC Women's Asian Cup qualifiers, coming on as a substitute in a 6–0 win against Cambodia, where she was sent off in the 90th minute for a late challenge on Hea Sreylas. The Philippines went on to qualify for the AFC Women's Asian Cup.

== Career statistics ==
=== International ===
As of match played December 5, 2025

Appearances and goals by national team and year
National team	Year	Apps	Goals
Philippines	2024	4	0
Philippines	2025	5	1
Total		9	1

List of international goals scored by Nina Mathelus
No.	Date	Venue	Opponent	Score	Result	Competition
1.	August 13, 2025	Lạch Tray Stadium, Hải Phòng, Vietnam	Myanmar	1–1	1–1	2025 ASEAN Women's Championship

== Personal life ==
Born in the United States, Mathelus is of Haitian and Filipino descent through her father and mother, respectively.

== Honors ==
Philippines

- Southeast Asian Games: 2025
