= Hong Kong women's national under-17 football team =

Women's national association football team representing Hong Kong

Hong Kong Women's U-17
- Nickname: The Strength (勁揪)
- Association: Hong Kong Football Association
- Confederation: AFC (Asia)
- Sub-confederation: EAFF (East Asia)
- Head coach: (Hong Kong) Lo Yiu Hung
- Captain: Chan Wing Lam
- Home stadium: Mong Kok Stadium
- FIFA code: HKG
First colors	Second colors

First international
- Hong Kong 0–22 Japan (Namhae, South Korea; 16 April 2005)

Biggest win
- Mongolia 0–9 Hong Kong (Ulaanbaatar, Mongolia; 8 April 2023)

Biggest defeat
- Hong Kong 0–22 Japan (Namhae, South Korea; 16 April 2005)

AFC U-17 Women's Asian Cup
- Appearances: 1 (first in 2005)
- Best result: Group stage (2005)

The Hong Kong women's national U-17 football team is the female representative football team for Hong Kong in under-17 women's competitions. The team plays once in AFC U-17 Women's Asian Cup. The nation has yet to qualify for the FIFA U-17 Women's World Cup.

== Team image ==
=== Nicknames ===
The Hong Kong women's national under-17 football team has been known or nicknamed as "The Strength"

=== Home stadium ===
Hong Kong plays its home matches at the Mong Kok Stadium and others stadiums.

== History ==
The Hong Kong women's national under-17 football team have played their debut game on 16 April 2005 at Namhae, South Korea versus Japan which the team lost by 0–22 goals. The team have once played in the AFC U-17 Women's Asian Cup in 2005 and they exited from the group stage. The nation has not qualified for the FIFA Women's U-17 World Cup.

== Current squad ==
The following squad was announced for the 2019 AFC U-16 Women's Championship qualification.

As of 30 December 2022

No.	Pos.	Player	Date of birth (age)	Caps	Goals	Club
1	GK	Jade Lau	3 June 2004	0	0	(Football Association of Hong Kong, China)
2	DF	Tsang Pak Tung	25 January 2004	0	0	(Football Association of Hong Kong, China)
3	DF	Hong Ching	9 February 2003	0	0	(Football Association of Hong Kong, China)
4		Natalie Sum	18 February 2004	0	0	(Football Association of Hong Kong, China)
5	DF	So Ching Long	17 July 2004	0	0	(Football Association of Hong Kong, China)
6	MF	Chan Yee Hing	27 May 2004	0	0	(Football Association of Hong Kong, China)
7	MF	Chan Wing Lam (Captain)	2 December 2004	0	0	(Football Association of Hong Kong, China)
8	FW	Anya Shuper	30 June 2004	0	0	(Football Association of Hong Kong, China)
9	FW	Karin Ishikawa	20 January 2004	0	0	(Football Association of Hong Kong, China)
10	FW	Sneha Limbu	17 September 2004	0	0	(Football Association of Hong Kong, China)
11	FW	Kwan Wing Yu	9 November 2003	0	0	(Football Association of Hong Kong, China)
12	FW	Fong Lok Ching	28 August 2004	0	0	(Football Association of Hong Kong, China)
13	MF	Wu Choi Yiu	12 May 2005	0	0	(Football Association of Hong Kong, China)
14	DF	Yung Hiu Yau	30 September 2004	0	0	(Football Association of Hong Kong, China)
15	MF	Lily Brewster	2 April 2004	0	0	(Football Association of Hong Kong, China) Kitchee
16	MF	Ng Yeuk Ching	11 April 2004	0	0	(Football Association of Hong Kong, China)
17	MF	Chu So Kwan	03 March 2004	0	0	(Football Association of Hong Kong, China)
18	GK	Allyson Shick	14 September 2004	0	0	(Football Association of Hong Kong, China)
19	DF	Chu Po Yan	18 February 2004	0	0	(Football Association of Hong Kong, China)
20	FW	Karri Chan	8 July 2004	0	0	(The Football Association) Blackburn Rovers W.F.C.
21	DF	Tse Wing Chin	7 June 2005	0	0	(Football Association of Hong Kong, China)
22	MF	Amelia Hui	21 April 2005	0	0	(Football Association of Hong Kong, China)
23	MF	Ching Ka Yam	31 January 2005	0	0	(Football Association of Hong Kong, China)

== Fixtures and results ==
Legend

Win Draw Loss Fixtures

=== 2026 ===
14 August Srikandi Merdeka Cup 2026 GS	Hong Kong	0–0	Malaysia	Kudus, Indonesia
16:00 UTC+7				Stadium: Supersoccer Arena

16 August Srikandi Merdeka Cup 2026 GS	Saudi Arabia	0–7	Hong Kong	Kudus, Indonesia
15:00 UTC+7				Stadium: Supersoccer Arena

18 August Srikandi Merdeka Cup 2026 GS	Indonesia	1–0	Hong Kong	Kudus, Indonesia
20:00 UTC+7				Stadium: Supersoccer Arena

8 October 2027 AFC U-17 WACQ	Hong Kong	v	Guam	Yangon, Myanmar
16:00 UTC+6:30				Stadium: Thuwunna Stadium

11 October 2027 AFC U-17 WACQ	Myanmar	v	Hong Kong	Yangon, Myanmar
16:00 UTC+6:30				Stadium: Thuwunna Stadium

== Competitive records ==
Champions Runners-up Third place Fourth place

=== FIFA U-17 Women's World Cup ===
FIFA U-17 Women's World Cup record
Year	Result	Position	Pld	W	D	L	GF	GA
(New Zealand) 2008	Did not qualify							
(Trinidad and Tobago) 2010	Did not qualify							
(Azerbaijan) 2012	Did not qualify							
(Costa Rica) 2014	Did not qualify							
(Jordan) 2016	Did not qualify							
(Uruguay) 2018	Did not qualify							
(India) 2022	Did not qualify							
(Dominican Republic) 2024	Did not qualify							
(Morocco) 2025	Did not qualify							
(Morocco) 2026	Did not qualify							
(Morocco) 2027	TBD							
Total	0/10	0 Titles	0	0	0	0	0	0

*Draws include knockout matches decided on penalty kicks.

=== AFC U-17 Women's Asian Cup ===
AFC U-17 Women's Asian Cup record
Year	Round	Position	MP	W	D*	L	GF	GA
(Japan) 2005	Group stages	–	3	1	1	1	3	24
(Malaysia) 2007 to (Thailand) 2019	Did not qualify							
(Indonesia) ~~2022~~	Cancelled							
(Indonesia) 2024	Did not qualify							
(China) 2026	Did not qualify							
(China) 2027	TBD							
Total	1/9	–	3	1	1	1	3	24

*Draws include knockout matches decided on penalty kicks.

=== AFC U-17 Women's Asian Cup qualification ===
AFC U-17 Women's Asian Cup qualification record
Year	Round	Position	MP	W	D*	L	GF	GA
(Japan) 2005	Directly enter							
(Malaysia) 2007	Did not enter							
(Thailand) 2009	Did not enter							
(China) 2011	Did not enter							
(China) 2013	DNQ	–	2	0	0	2	0	8
(China) 2015	DNQ	–	3	0	0	3	0	28
(Thailand) 2017	DNQ	–	5	1	1	3	4	24
(Thailand) 2019	DNQ	–	4	2	0	2	9	10
(Indonesia) ~~2022~~	Cancelled							
(Indonesia) 2024	DNQ	–	2	1	0	1	3	12
(China) 2026	DNQ	–	2	1	0	1	7	22
(China) 2027	TBD							
Total	1/9	–	16	4	1	11	20	72

*Draws include knockout matches decided on penalty kicks.
