= Natsuko Hara =

Japanese footballer

Natsuko Hara 原 菜摘子
Personal information
- Full name: Natsuko Hara
- Date of birth: March 1, 1989 (age 37)
- Place of birth: Ome, Tokyo, Japan
- Height: 1.55 m (5 ft 1 in)
- Position: Midfielder

Youth career
- 2001–2006: Nippon TV Beleza

Senior career*
Years	Team	Apps	(Gls)
2006–2015	Nippon TV Beleza	149	(5)
Total		149	(5)

International career
2008	Japan U-20	3	(0)
2010	Japan	2	(0)
Medal record
Nippon TV Beleza
Winner	Nadeshiko League	2006
Winner	Nadeshiko League	2007
Winner	Nadeshiko League	2008
Winner	Nadeshiko League	2010
Winner	Nadeshiko League	2015
Runner-up	Nadeshiko League	2009
Runner-up	Nadeshiko League	2011
Runner-up	Nadeshiko League	2012
Runner-up	Nadeshiko League	2013
Runner-up	Nadeshiko League	2014
Winner	Nadeshiko League Cup	2007
Winner	Nadeshiko League Cup	2010
Winner	Nadeshiko League Cup	2012
Winner	Empress's Cup	2007
Winner	Empress's Cup	2008
Winner	Empress's Cup	2009
Winner	Empress's Cup	2014
Representing Japan
AFC U-19 Women's Championship
Silver medal – second place	2007 China
AFC U-16 Women's Championship
Gold medal – first place	2005 South Korea
- * Club domestic league appearances and goals

Natsuko Hara (原 菜摘子, Hara Natsuko; born March 1, 1989) is a former Japanese football player. She played for Japan national team.

== Club career ==
Hara was born in Ome on March 1, 1989. She was promoted to Nippon TV Beleza from youth team in 2006. Especially since 2009, she played in many games as a successor of Japan national team player Homare Sawa moved to United States. She played until 2015. In 10 seasons, she played 149 matches in L.League and she was selected Best Eleven in 2015.

== National team career ==
In April 2005, when Hara was 16 years old, she was selected Japan U-17 national team for 2005 AFC U-17 Championship. At the tournament, she played as captain and she became top scorer with 12 goals. She was named Asian Footballer of the Year. In November 2008, Natsuko Hara was selected for the Japan U-20 national team for the 2008 U-20 World Cup. On January 13, 2010, she played for the Japan national team for the first time against Denmark. She played two games for Japan in 2010.

== National team statistics ==
Japan national team
Year	Apps	Goals
2010	2	0
Total	2	0
