= 2027 AFC U-17 Women's Asian Cup =

Tournament details
- Host country: China
- Dates: 31 March–17 April 2027
- Teams: 12 (from 1 confederation)

The 2027 AFC U-17 Women's Asian Cup will be the 11th edition of the AFC U-17 Women's Asian Cup (including previous editions of the AFC U-17 Women's Championship and AFC U-16 Women's Championship), the annual international youth football championship organised by the Asian Football Confederation (AFC) for the women's under-17 national teams of Asia. The 2027 tournament were the second of three consecutive AFC U-17 Women's Asian Cup to be held in China (also in Suzhou), following the 2026 tournament and preceding the 2028 tournament.

It will be held in China between 31 March–17 April 2027. A total of twelve teams will compete in the tournament.

The top four teams of the tournament will qualify for the 2027 FIFA U-17 Women's World Cup in Morocco as the AFC representatives.

== Qualification ==
The host country and the top three teams of the previous tournament in 2026 qualified automatically, while the other eight teams were decided by qualification. There was one round of qualification matches, which was held between 3–11 October 2026.

=== Qualified teams ===
The following twelve teams qualified for the tournament:

Team	Qualification method	Date of qualification	Appearance(s)				Previous best performance (Note: Bold text indicates they hosted that edition.)
Team	Qualification method	Date of qualification	Total	First	Last	Streak	Previous best performance
China	Host nation & 2026 3rd place	14 April 2025	11th	2005	2026	11	Runners-up (2005)
North Korea	2026 champions	14 May 2026	10th	2007	2026	10	Champions (2007, 2015, 2017, 2024, 2026)
Japan	2026 runners-up	14 May 2026	11th	2005	2026	11	Champions (2005, 2011, 2013, 2019)
Australia	2026 fourth place	14 May 2026	9th	2005	2026	5	Fourth place (2009, 2019, 2026)
South Korea	Group A winners	11 October 2026	11th	2005	2026	11	Champions (2009)
Indonesia	Group B winners	11 October 2026	3rd	2005	2024	1	Group stage (2005, 2024)
Chinese Taipei	Group C winners	11 October 2026	6th	2005	2026	2	Group stage (2005, 2009, 2013, 2015, 2026)
Vietnam	Group D winners	11 October 2026	3rd	2019	2026	2	Quarterfinals (2026)
India	Group E winners	11 October 2026	3rd	2005	2026	2	Quarterfinals (2026)
Thailand	Group F winners	11 October 2026	11th	2005	2026	11	Third place (2005)
Myanmar	Group G winners	11 October 2026	3rd	2009	2026	2	Group stage (2009, 2026)
Philippines	Group H winners	11 October 2026	3rd	2024	2026	3	Group stage (2024, 2026)

== Venues ==
To be confirmed.

== Draw ==
Following the conclusion of the qualifiers, a final draw will be held in December 2026 to determine the Group Stage fate of the 12 participating teams.

The twelve teams were drawn into three groups of four teams. The teams were seeded according to a points system derived from their final rankings across the previous three editions, with the hosts China automatically seeded and assigned to Position A1 in the draw.

Pot 1	Pot 2	Pot 3	Pot 4
1. China (hosts); 2. North Korea; 3. Japan	4. Australia; 5. South Korea; 6. Thailand	7. Vietnam; 8. Philippines; 9. India	10. Chinese Taipei; 11. Indonesia; 12. Myanmar

== Match officials ==
The match officials will be announced closer to the start of the tournament.

Referees

TBD

Assistant referees

TBD

== Squads ==
Players born between 1 January 2010 and 31 December 2012 were eligible to compete in the tournament. Each team must register a squad of minimum 18 players and maximum 23 players, minimum three of whom must be goalkeepers (Regulations Articles 22.1 and 26.3).

== Group stage ==
The top two teams of each group and two best third-placed teams advanced to the quarter-finals.

Tiebreakers

Teams are ranked according to points (3 points for a win, 1 point for a draw, 0 points for a loss), and should they be tied on points, the following tiebreaking criteria are applied, in the order given, to determine the rankings (Regulations Article 7.3):

1. Points in head-to-head matches among tied teams;
2. Goal difference in head-to-head matches among tied teams;
3. Goals scored in head-to-head matches among tied teams;
4. Should more than two teams be tied, and after applying all head-to-head criteria above, a subset of teams are still tied, all head-to-head criteria above are reapplied exclusively to this subset of teams;
5. Goal difference in all group matches;
6. Goals scored in all group matches;
7. Penalty shoot-out if only two teams are tied and they meet in the last round of the group;
8. Disciplinary points (yellow card = 1 point, red card as a result of two yellow cards = 3 points, direct red card = 3 points, yellow card followed by direct red card = 4 points);
9. Drawing of lots.

All times are local, CST (UTC+8).

=== Group A ===
TBD

=== Group B ===
TBD

=== Group C ===
TBD

=== Ranking of third-placed teams ===
Pos	Grp	Team	Pld	W	D	L	GF	GA	GD	Pts	Qualification
1	A	To be determined	0	0	0	0	0	0	0	0	Knockout stage
2	B	To be determined	0	0	0	0	0	0	0	0	Knockout stage
3	C	To be determined	0	0	0	0	0	0	0	0	

First match(es) will be played: unknown. Source: AFC
Rules for classification: Qualification tiebreakers

== Knockout stage ==
In the knockout stage, extra time and a penalty shoot-out are used to decide the winners if necessary.

=== Bracket ===
Quarter-finals
TBD
To be determined
To be determined
TBD
To be determined
To be determined
TBD
To be determined
To be determined
TBD
To be determined
To be determined

Semi-finals
TBD
To be determined
To be determined
TBD
To be determined
To be determined

Final
TBD
To be determined
To be determined

=== Quarter-finals ===
The winners qualify for the 2027 FIFA U-17 Women's World Cup.

TBD

To be determined	v	To be determined

TBD

To be determined	v	To be determined

TBD

To be determined	v	To be determined

TBD

To be determined	v	To be determined

=== Semi-finals ===
TBD

To be determined	v	To be determined

TBD

To be determined	v	To be determined

=== Final ===
TBD

To be determined	v	To be determined

== Goalscorers ==
TBD

== Qualified teams for FIFA U-17 Women's World Cup ==
The following four teams from AFC qualify for the 2027 FIFA U-17 Women's World Cup.

Team	Qualified on	Previous appearances in FIFA U-17 Women's World Cup (Note: Bold indicates champions for that year. Italic indicates hosts for that year.)
TBD	April 2027	
TBD	April 2027	
TBD	April 2027	
TBD	April 2027	

== See also ==
- 2028 AFC U-20 Women's Asian Cup
- 2027 AFC U-17 Asian Cup
