= Singapore women's national under-20 football team =

Singapore U-20
- Association: Football Association of Singapore (FAS)
- Confederation: AFC (Asia)
- Sub-confederation: AFF (Southeast Asia)
- Head coach: Manisha Tailor (U20); Katerina Falida (U16)
- FIFA code: SIN
First colours	Second colours

The Singapore women's national under-20 football team most recently participated at the 2024 AFC U-20 Women's Asian Cup qualification.

The team will also take part in the 2023 AFF Under-19 Women's Championship in July 2023.

The Singapore women's national under-17 football team most recent participated at the AFC Cup U17 Qualifying and also took part in the JENESYS Japan-ASEAN 50th Memorial Cup for U-17 Women's Football U-17 Women's Football Memorial Cup in 2023.

== History ==
=== U20 ===
In 2023, the U20 national women's team which participated at the 2024 AFC U-20 Women's Asian Cup qualification. The Singapore U-20 Women's National Football team suffered a crushing defeat in their first qualifying match for the AFC U-20 Women's Asian Cup 2024, losing 7–0 to India. The team suffered a heavy defeat against Vietnam in the AFC U20 Women's Asian Cup qualifiers, losing 11-0 and placing last in Group F.

=== U17 ===
In 2022, the U17 team was selected by FIFA to participate in the UEFA Assist U-17 Girls Competition. This international exposure serves as crucial preparation for the upcoming AFF U-19 Women's Championship in Indonesia. The team, featuring both rising stars and an experienced player like Siti Nurerwadah, is excited to compete and gain valuable experience on the international stage. This participation bodes well for the future of Singapore's women's football, fostering team chemistry and confidence ahead of the regional championship. However, they failed to win any of the 3 matches they played, drawing 1 match against Mongolia.

In 2023, the U17 national women's team which participated at the AFC Cup U17 Qualifying and they dominated their first ever home international match, crushing Turkmenistan 7–0 with a commanding performance. This victory puts them in first place in their qualifying group and needing just a draw to advance to the next round. However, fell short in their final qualifying match but showcased promise for the future. Despite the 3–0 defeat, the team displayed strong defensive play and Coach Falida Aikaterini remains optimistic about their continued development.

== Coaching staff ==
Position	Name
Technical Director	(England) Michael Browne
National Coach	(Japan) Mihoko Ishida
National U20 Coach	(Singapore) Fazrul Nawaz
National U19 Coach	(Singapore) Fazrul Nawaz
National U16 Coach	(Australia) Matias Martinez

== Results and fixtures (U17) ==
=== 2026 ===
15 August 2026 Srikandi Merdeka Cup 2026 GS	Singapore	1–3	Jordan	Kudus, Indonesia
15:00 UTC+7		Report		Stadium: Supersoccer Arena

17 August 2026 Srikandi Merdeka Cup 2026 GS	PUTRI NUSANTARA	0–2	Singapore	Kudus, Indonesia
10:00 UTC+7		Report		Stadium: Supersoccer Arena

19 August 2026 Srikandi Merdeka Cup 2026 GS	Thailand	6–0	Singapore	Kudus, Indonesia
10:00 UTC+7		Report		Stadium: Supersoccer Arena

5 October 2026 2027 Asian Cup qualification	Singapore	1–0	Saudi Arabia	Bishan, Singapore
20:00 UTC+8	Tan 23'	Report		Stadium: Bishan Stadium; Referee: Wang Chieh (Chinese Taipei)

8 October 2026 2027 Asian Cup qualification	Bahrain	0–4	Singapore	Bishan, Singapore
20:00 UTC+8				Stadium: Bishan Stadium

11 October 2026 2027 Asian Cup qualification	Indonesia	5–0	Singapore	Bishan, Singapore
20:00 UTC+8				Stadium: Bishan Stadium

== Players ==
=== Current squad (U20) ===
The following 23 players are named for the announced for AFC Under-20 Women's Asian Cup Qualifiers.

Caps and goals to be updated.

No.	Pos.	Player	Date of birth (age)	Caps	Goals	Club
1	GK	Chantale Lamasan	11 January 2009 (age 17)	2	0	(United States Soccer Federation) IMG Academy (USA)
21	GK	Alysha Nasrina	23 October 2007 (age 19)	0	0	(Football Association of Singapore) Geylang International
23	GK	Aaliya Rosman	19 January 2008 (age 18)	0	0	(Football Association of Singapore) Albirex Niigata (S)
2	DF	Irsalina Irwan	1 January 2007 (age 19)	0	0	unattached
3	DF	Aqilah Salihin	24 January 2008 (age 18)	1	0	(Football Association of Singapore) BG Tampines Rovers
4	DF	Yasmine Zaharin	19 March 2007 (age 19)	2	0	unattached
5	DF	Crystal Wu	13 September 2006 (age 20)	0	0	(Football Association of Singapore) Tanjong Pagar United
8	DF	Seri Nurinsyirah	29 January 2009 (age 17)	2	0	(United States Soccer Federation) IMG Academy (USA)
14	DF	Nurzaherra Maisarah	21 October 2006 (age 20)	2	0	(Football Association of Singapore) Albirex Niigata (S)
15	DF	Qarissa Putri	24 September 2008 (age 18)	2	0	(Football Association of Singapore) Lion City Sailors
18	DF	Siti Nurfarah	22 August 2006 (age 20)	0	0	(Football Association of Singapore) Hougang United
6	MF	Natasha Naszri	19 December 2007 (age 18)	2	0	(Royal Spanish Football Federation) Madrid CFF
9	MF	Nadila Affendey	28 April 2008 (age 18)	0	0	(Royal Spanish Football Federation) Madrid CFF
11	MF	Liyana Rickit	14 October 2009 (age 17)	1	0	(United States Soccer Federation) IMG Academy (USA)
13	MF	Sarah Hobrecht	11 June 2007 (age 19)	1	0	(United States Soccer Federation) Southwestern College
16	MF	Sarah Zu’risqha	24 July 2006 (age 20)	2	0	(Football Association of Singapore) Lion City Sailors
17	MF	Yuvika Suresh	11 March 2009 (age 17)	2	0	(United States Soccer Federation) IMG Academy (USA)
19	MF	Kyra Taylor	19 June 2006 (age 20)	2	0	(Football Association of Singapore) Geylang International
7	FW	Cara Chang	28 November 2008 (age 17)	2	0	(Football Association of Singapore) Lion City Sailors
10	FW	Mulan Ayliffe	10 May 2008 (age 18)	2	0	(Football Association of Serbia) Red Star Belgrade
12	FW	Nahwah Aidilreza	4 May 2007 (age 19)	1	0	(Football Association of Singapore) BG Tampines Rovers
20	FW	Zoey Chua	26 March 2006 (age 20)	0	0	(Football Association of Singapore) Hougang United
22	FW	Chloe Koh	18 December 2007 (age 18)	1	0	(Football Association of Singapore) Geylang International

=== Current squad (U18/19) ===
The following 23 players are named for the announced for AFF U19 Women's Cup.

Caps and goals to be updated.

No.	Pos.	Player	Date of birth (age)	Caps	Goals	Club
1	GK	Nurul Atiqah	22 September 2006 (age 20)	0	0	(Football Association of Singapore) JSSL FC
22	GK	Nur Izairida Shakira	2 June 2007 (age 19)	1	0	(Football Association of Singapore) Lion City Sailors
23	GK	Alyssha Hannah	18 October 2004 (age 22)	0	0	(Football Association of Singapore) Ayer Rajah Gryphon
2	DF	Dhaniyah Qasimah	7 July 2004 (age 22)	1	0	(Football Association of Singapore) Tanjong Pagar United
3	DF	Siti Nurerwadah Erwan	26 June 2006 (age 20)	1	0	(Football Association of Singapore) Balestier Khalsa
4	DF	Nadia Mohammad Nuraffendi	14 April 2006 (age 20)	0	0	(Football Association of Singapore) Mattar Sailors
5	DF	Nur Adrianna Hazeri	3 July 2006 (age 20)	0	0	(Football Association of Singapore) Tanjong Pagar United
6	DF	Seri Nurinsyirah Indra Saharen	29 January 2009 (age 17)	0	0	(Football Association of Singapore) Lion City Sailors
8	DF	Ariesa Zahran	23 May 2006 (age 20)	0	0	(Football Association of Singapore) Still Aerion FC
15	DF	Irsalina Binte Irwan	1 January 2007 (age 19)	3		(Japan Football Association) Albirex Niigata (W)
18	DF	Ardhra Arul Ganeswaran	25 July 2007 (age 19)	0	0	(Football Association of Singapore) Lion City Sailors
20	DF	Qarissa Putri Ramadhani Zahary	24 September 2008 (age 18)	1	0	(Football Association of Singapore) Tanjong Pagar United
21	DF	Yasmine Zaharin	19 March 2007 (age 19)	1	0	(Football Association of Singapore) Geylang International
10	MF	Nasriah Ibrahim	1 September 2004 (age 22)	1	0	(Football Association of Singapore) Balestier Khalsa
11	MF	Kyra Elise Taylor	19 June 2006 (age 20)	1	0	(Football Association of Singapore) Police SA
12	MF	Liyana Indah Rickit	14 October 2009 (age 17)	0	0	(Football Association of Singapore) Lion City Sailors
14	MF	Nurzaherra Maisarah	21 October 2006 (age 20)	0	0	(Football Association of Singapore) Police SA
16	MF	Nur Sarah Zu’risqha Zul’kepli	24 July 2006 (age 20)	1	0	(Japan Football Association) Albirex Niigata (W)
17	MF	Cara Ming-Yan Chang	28 November 2008 (age 17)	1	0	(Football Association of Singapore) Lion City Sailors
19	MF	Seri Ayu Natasha Naszri	19 December 2007 (age 18)	0	0	(Football Association of Singapore) Lion City Sailors
7	FW	Chloe Koh Ke Ying	18 February 2007 (age 19)	0	0	(Football Association of Singapore) Lion City Sailors
9	FW	Farah Nurzahirah	13 January 2004 (age 22)	1	0	(Football Association of Singapore) Tanjong Pagar United
13	FW	Josephine Ang Kaile	26 September 2006 (age 20)	0	0	(Football Association of Singapore) Lion City Sailors

=== Recent call-ups (U18/19) ===
The following players have also been called up to the squad in the last 12 months.

Pos.	Player	Date of birth (age)	Caps	Goals	Club	Latest call-up

=== Current squad (U16) ===
The following players were selected for AFC U17 Women’s Asian Cup Qualifiers.

Caps and goals to be updated.

No.	Pos.	Player	Date of birth (age)	Caps	Goals	Club
1	GK	Nur Umairah	4 September 2010 (age 16)	0	0	(Football Association of Singapore) SFA Combined Girls
2	GK	Adra Faiz	4 September 2010 (age 16)	0	0	(Football Association of Singapore) Balestier Khalsa
3	GK	Sophie Chan	10 April 2011 (age 15)	0	0	(Football Association of Singapore) SFA Combined Girls
4	DF	Tessa Ng	15 May 2011 (age 15)	0	0	(Football Association of Singapore) Lion City Sailors/NDC
5	DF	Ayla Chin	19 August 2010 (age 16)	0	0	(Football Association of Singapore) Still Aerion/NDC
6	DF	Sofea Ayu	6 March 2011 (age 15)	0	0	(Football Association of Singapore) Balestier Khalsa
7	DF	Auni Shellah	3 January 2011 (age 15)	0	0	(Football Association of Singapore) Lion City Sailors
8	DF	Syahirah Issaka	15 September 2010 (age 16)	0	0	(Football Association of Singapore) Lion City Sailors
9	DF	Rasyiqah Miza	16 October 2010 (age 16)	0	0	(Football Association of Singapore) Lion City Sailors
10	DF	Chloe Boulliung	20 June 2010 (age 16)	0	0	(United States Soccer Federation) Millburn High School
11	DF	Kylie Loo	27 April 2010 (age 16)	0	0	(United States Soccer Federation) So Cal Blues Soccer Club
12	MF	Putri Alyssa	26 November 2011 (age 14)	0	0	(Football Association of Singapore) Still Aerion/NDC
13	MF	Qhalisah Arysha	22 November 2011 (age 14)	0	0	(Football Association of Singapore) Lion City Sailors
14	MF	Verona Lim	20 January 2010 (age 16)	0	0	(Football Association of Singapore) FC Jurong
15	MF	Ain Salleh	7 January 2010 (age 16)	0	0	(Football Association of Singapore) Lion City Sailors
16	MF	Puteri Qisya	13 February 2011 (age 15)	0	0	(Football Association of Singapore) Balestier Khalsa
17	MF	Ho Ray-En	20 April 2011 (age 15)	0	0	(United States Soccer Federation) Penn Fusion Soccer Academy
18	MF	Celine Koh	5 May 2010 (age 16)	0	0	(United States Soccer Federation) IMG Academy
19	MF	Aria Romano	12 August 2011 (age 15)	0	0	(United States Soccer Federation) IMG Academy
20	FW	Sophie Ong	18 August 2011 (age 15)	0	0	(Football Association of Singapore) JSSL FC
20	FW	Sophie Ong	18 August 2011 (age 15)	0	0	(Football Association of Singapore) JSSL FC
21	FW	Amelia Tan	3 October 2011 (age 15)	0	0	(Football Association of Singapore) Lion City Sailors
22	FW	Myra Wang	19 July 2011 (age 15)	0	0	(Luxembourg Football Federation) FC Kehlen
23	FW	Amelia Ng Jing Xuan	16 August 2010 (age 16)	0	0	(Football Association of Singapore) Lion City Sailors

=== Recent call-ups (U16) ===
The following players have also been called up to the squad in the last 12 months.

Pos.	Player	Date of birth (age)	Caps	Goals	Club	Latest call-up
GK	Chantale Lamasan	11 January 2009 (age 17)	0	0	(United States) IMG Academy	v. Australia, 18 October 2025
GK	Talia Sachet	10 July 2009 (age 17)	0	0	(Singapore) Balestier Khalsa	v. Australia, 18 October 2025
GK	Julia Huss	29 September 2011 (age 15)	0	0	(Singapore) Mattar Sailors/NDC	v. Thailand, 19 Aug 2026
DF	Daania Alodia	28 January 2011 (age 15)	0	0	(Singapore) Mattar Sailors/NDC	v. Thailand, 19 Aug 2026
DF	Vafa Dhabitah	2 April 2010 (age 16)	0	0	(Singapore) Balestier Khalsa	v. Thailand, 19 Aug 2026
DF	Syaizta Ohorella Izan	10 February 2009 (age 17)	0	0	(Singapore) Mattar Sailors	v. Australia, 18 October 2025
DF	Seri Nurinsyirah	29 January 2009 (age 17)	0	0	(United States) IMG Academy	v. Australia, 18 October 2025
DF	Natasha Kaur	15 June 2009 (age 17)	0	0	(Singapore) Geylang International	v. Australia, 18 October 2025
DF	Calista Dodson	20 November 2009 (age 17)	0	0	(Singapore) National Development Centre	v. Australia, 18 October 2025
DF	Sophie Lee		0	0	(Singapore) JSSL	v. Thailand, 25 August 2025
MF	Nur Hannah	5 October 2011 (age 15)	0	0	(Singapore) Frenz Circuit GDT/NDC	v. Thailand, 19 Aug 2026
MF	Hani Raisha	22 November 2011 (age 14)	0	0	(Singapore) Lion City Sailors	v. Thailand, 19 Aug 2026
MF	Nayli Elvira	1 October 2010 (age 16)	0	0	(Singapore) Frenz Circuit GDT/NDC	v. Thailand, 19 Aug 2026
MF	Liyana Indah Rickit	14 October 2009 (age 17)	0	0	(United States) IMG Academy	v. Australia, 18 October 2025
MF	Nayli Elvira Sha'aril	1 October 2010 (age 16)	0	0	(Singapore) Mattar Sailors	v. Australia, 18 October 2025
MF	Rayna Balqis	15 July 2009 (age 17)	0	0	(Singapore) National Development Centre	v. Australia, 18 October 2025
FW	Svea Hertzman	26 August 2010 (age 16)	0	0	(Singapore) Geylang International	v. Thailand, 19 Aug 2026
FW	Nur Amelia	14 September 2010 (age 16)	0	0	(Singapore) SFA Combined Girls	v. Thailand, 19 Aug 2026
FW	Ain Salleh	7 January 2010 (age 16)	0	0	(Spain) Madrid CFF	v. Australia, 18 October 2025
FW	Yuvika Suresh	1 March 2009 (age 17)	0	0	(United States) IMG Academy	v. Australia, 18 October 2025
FW	Risya Rizqyqa	14 January 2011 (age 15)	0	0	(Singapore) National Development Centre	v. Australia, 18 October 2025
FW	Naureen Qadriyah	9 June 2009 (age 17)	0	0	(Singapore) Tiong Bahru FC	v. Australia, 18 October 2025
FW	Aliyah Imarsha		0	0	(Singapore)	v. Thailand, 25 August 2025

== Competitive record ==
Match correct as at May 2023.

=== AFC Women's U20 Asian Cup ===
Qualification								AFC Women's U20 Asian Cup						
Year	GP	W	D*	L	GS	GA	GD	GP	W	D	L	GS	GA	GD
(Uzbekistan) 2024	3	0	0	3	0	22	−22	Did not qualify						

=== AFC U-19 Women's Championship ===
Qualification								AFC U-19 Women's Championship						
Year	GP	W	D*	L	GS	GA	GD	GP	W	D	L	GS	GA	GD
(India) 2002	NA							3	1	0	2	2	34	-32
(China) 2004	NA							3	0	0	3	0	8	-8
(Malaysia) 2006	2	0	0	2	0	4	−4	Did not qualify						
(China) 2007	4	0	0	4	1	42	−41	Did not qualify						
(China) 2009	5	0	0	5	2	62	−60	Did not qualify						
(Vietnam) 2011	Did not participate							Did not qualify						
(China) 2013	Did not participate							Did not qualify						
(China) 2015	3	0	0	3	1	32	−31	Did not qualify						
(China) 2017	Withdrawn							Did not qualify						
(Thailand) 2019	3	0	1	2	0	19	−19	Did not qualify						

=== AFF U-19 Women's Championship ===
Qualification								AFF U-19 Women's Championship						
Year	GP	W	D*	L	GS	GA	GD	GP	W	D	L	GS	GA	GD
(Thailand) 2014	NA							4	1	0	3	4	34	-30

=== AFF U-18 Women's Championship ===
Qualification								AFF U-18 Women's Championship						
Year	GP	W	D*	L	GS	GA	GD	GP	W	D	L	GS	GA	GD
(Indonesia) 2022	NA							4	0	1	3	1	17	-16

=== AFC U17 Women's Asian Cup ===
Qualification								AFC U17 Women's Asian Cup						
Year	GP	W	D*	L	GS	GA	GD	GP	W	D	L	GS	GA	GD
(Indonesia) 2024	2	1	0	1	7	3	4	Did not qualify						
(China) 2026	To be determined							TBD						

=== AFC U-17 Women's Championship ===
Qualification								AFC U-17 Women's Championship						
Year	GP	W	D*	L	GS	GA	GD	GP	W	D	L	GS	GA	GD
(South Korea) 2005	NA							2	0	0	2	0	34	-34

=== AFC U-16 Women's Championship ===
Qualification								AFC U-16 Women's Championship						
Year	GP	W	D*	L	GS	GA	GD	GP	W	D	L	GS	GA	GD
(Malaysia) 2007	NA							Did not participate						
(Thailand) 2009	4	0	0	4	1	44	-43	Did not qualify						
(China) 2011	4	1	0	3	7	13	-6	Did not qualify						
(China) 2013	Did not participate							Did not qualify						
(China) 2015	Did not participate							Did not qualify						
(Thailand) 2017	5	0	1	4	3	29	-26	Did not qualify						
(Thailand) 2019	4	2	0	2	8	11	-3	Did not qualify						

=== AFF U-16 Girls' Championship ===
Qualification								AFF U-16 Girls' Championship						
Year	GP	W	D*	L	GS	GA	GD	GP	W	D	L	GS	GA	GD
(Myanmar) 2009	NA							Did not participate						
(Laos) 2017	NA							3	1	0	2	3	6	-3
(Indonesia) 2018	NA							4	0	2	2	5	15	-10
(Thailand) 2019	NA							4	1	0	3	2	14	-12

== See also ==
- Singapore women's national football team
