= Wajee Kertsombun =

Thai footballer (born 1988)

Personal information
- Date of birth: 2 April 1988 (age 38)
- Position: Midfielder

International career^{‡}
Years	Team	Apps	(Gls)
2005	Thailand U17	1+	(1)
2007	Thailand U19	0+	(0)
2007–2011	Thailand	3+	(0)
- ‡ National team caps and goals as of 24 May 2010.

Wajee Kertsombun (Thai: วาจี เกิดสมบูรณ์; born 2 April 1988) is a Thai footballer who plays as a midfielder. She has been a member of the Thailand women's national team.

== International career ==
Wajee represented Thailand at the 2005 AFC U-17 Women's Championship and the 2007 AFC U-19 Women's Championship. She capped at senior level during three AFC Women's Asian Cup editions (2006, 2008 and 2010), two Asian Games editions (2006 and 2010), the 2007 Southeast Asian Games, and the 2012 AFC Women's Olympic Qualifying Tournament.
