= Mari Kawamura =

Japanese footballer

Mari Kawamura 川村 真理
Personal information
- Full name: Mari Kawamura
- Date of birth: December 19, 1988 (age 37)
- Place of birth: Fukuoka, Japan
- Height: 1.60 m (5 ft 3 in)
- Position: Midfielder

Youth career
- 2004–2006: Fukuoka Jogakuin High School

Senior career*
Years	Team	Apps	(Gls)
2006–2013	Fukuoka J. Anclas	122	(100)
2013–2015	JEF United Chiba	66	(9)
Total		188	(109)

International career
2008	Japan U-20	4	(0)
2013	Japan	2	(0)
Medal record
Representing Japan
AFC U-16 Women's Championship
Gold medal – first place	2005 South Korea
- * Club domestic league appearances and goals

Mari Kawamura (川村 真理, Kawamura Mari; born December 19, 1988) is a Japanese former who played for the Japan national team footballer as a midfielder.

== Club career ==
Kawamura was born in Fukuoka Prefecture on December 19, 1988. She joined the L.League Division 2 club Fukuoka J. Anclas in 2006. She played 77 games and scored 90 goals in Division 2 until 2009. In April 2013, she moved to JEF United Chiba. She retired at the end of the 2015 season.

== National team career ==
In November 2008, Kawamura was selected for the Japan U-20 national team for the 2008 U-20 World Cup. In March 2013, she was selected by the Japan national team for the 2013 Algarve Cup. At this competition, she debuted against Norway on March 6. She played two games for Japan in 2013.

== National team statistics ==
Japan national team
Year	Apps	Goals
2013	2	0
Total	2	0
