= Park Cho-rong (footballer) =

South Korean footballer (born 1988)

Personal information
- Full name: Park Cho-rong
- Date of birth: 20 February 1988 (age 38)
- Place of birth: South Korea
- Height: 1.58 m (5 ft 2 in)
- Position: Defender

Senior career*
Years	Team	Apps	(Gls)
2008–2010	Seoul WFC	39	(4)
2011–2012	Chungnam Ilhwa Chunma	37	(7)
2013–2020	Hwacheon KSPO		
2021	Sejong Sportstoto		

International career
2005	South Korea U17	1	(2)
2017–2018	South Korea	4	(0)
- * Club domestic league appearances and goals

Park Cho-rong (Korean: 박초롱; born 20 February 1988) is a former South Korean footballer who played as a defender. She was a member of the South Korea women's national team.

== Club career ==
A graduate of the girls' football academies at Osan Girls' Middle School and Osan I.C.T. Industry High School, Park went on to play for Yeoju University. She played for Seoul City in the inaugural season of the WK League, recording an assist and a goal in the league's first ever match, in which Seoul beat Busan Sangmu 2–0. Park went on to play for Chungnam Ilhwa and Hwacheon KSPO, helping the latter progress to the championship final in 2017. She also played in the 2017 WK League all-star match.

== International career ==
Park received her first senior call-up for South Korea in 2017 at the age of 29, under manager Yoon Deok-yeo. She played in a pair of friendlies against the United States and was part of the squad for the EAFF E-1 Championship later the same year.

== Style of play ==
Park previously played as a forward but began playing in defence after joining Hwacheon KSPO. She was left-footed and was known for her accurate crossing.

== Honours ==
Yeoju University

- National Women's Football Championship winner: 2006

Seoul City Amazones

- National Women's Football Championship runner-up: 2010
- National Sports Festival runner-up: 2010

Hwacheon KSPO

- National Sports Festival runner-up: 2013
- WK League runner-up: 2017
