= Shivani Toppo =

Indian footballer

Personal information
- Date of birth: 17 October 2007 (age 19)
- Place of birth: Hutup, Ranchi district, Jharkhand, India
- Position: Midfielder

Team information
- Current team: HOPS

Senior career*
Years	Team	Apps	(Gls)
- FC United Kanke
2022–2023	East Bengal		
2024–2025	Sribhumi		
2025–2026	Garhwal United		
2026–	HOPS		

International career^{‡}
2023	India U17		
2024	India U20		
2024–	India	2	(0)
- * Club domestic league appearances and goals ‡ National team caps and goals as of 2 January 2025

Shivani Toppo (born 17 October 2007) is an Indian professional footballer from Jharkhand, who plays as a defender for the Indian Women's League club HOPS and the India women's national football team. She has also represented the Jharkhand state team in the domestic tournaments.

== Early life and career ==
Toppo was born in Hutup village, Ranchi district, Jharkhand. She is born in a poor family but her mother Jhari Devi and grandfather Dukhan Pathan encouraged her to play football. She was trained under Franz Gastler who runs Yuwa India, a non-government organisation which trains rural girls in football with an aim to bring social development through football.

== Career ==
Toppo began football as a 13-year old and played her first international tour was to Spain with her NGO team. Later, she went to Sri Lanka in June 2016. Two girls from Yuwa were selected for the India under-14 team's Lanka tour and she was one of them.

She was selected in the 23-player Indian squad by Indian coach Joakim Alexandersson and she played the two FIFA international friendlies against Maldives on 30 December and 2 January at the Padukone-Dravid Centre for Sports Excellence in Bengaluru. She also represented the SAAF Under-17 Women's Football Championship games at Dhaka in March 2023. She also played the women Asia Cup qualifiers in April 2023 at Indonesia.

== Career statistics ==
=== International ===
As of 2 January 2025

National team	Year	Caps	Goals
India	2024	1	0
India	2025	1	0
Total		2	0
