= Fuka Kono =

Japanese association football player

Personal information
- Date of birth: 15 January 1998 (age 28)
- Place of birth: Aichi Prefecture, Japan,
- Height: 1.54 m (5 ft 1 in)
- Position: Forward

Team information
- Current team: Albirex Niigata
- Number: 9

Senior career*
Years	Team	Apps	(Gls)
	Albirex Niigata	2	(0)
- * Club domestic league appearances and goals

Fuka Kono (born 15 January 1998) is a Japanese professional footballer who plays as a forward for WE League club Albirex Niigata.

== Club career ==
Kono made her WE League debut on 12 September 2021.
