= Fatemeh Geraeli =

Iranian footballer (born 1999)

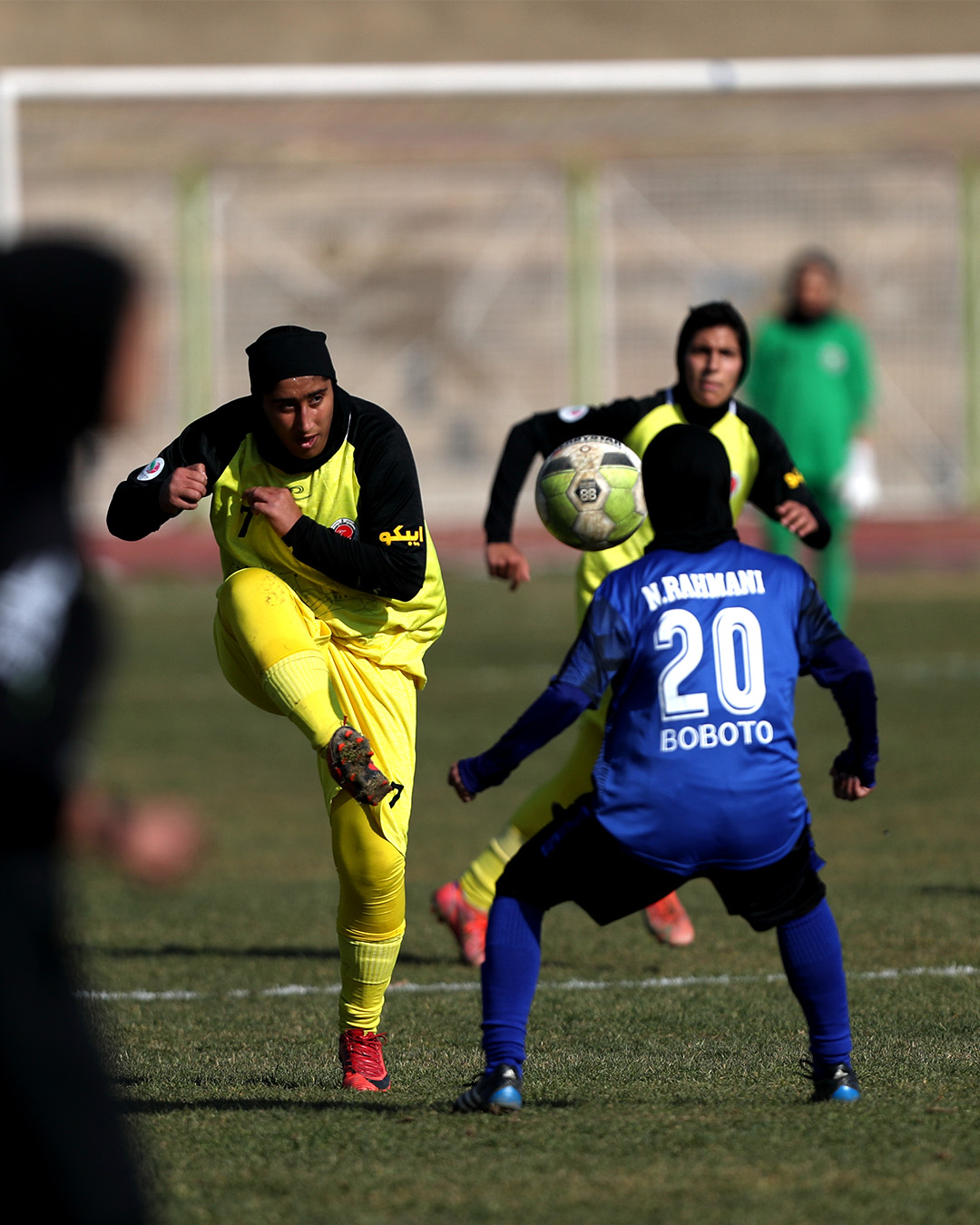
- Geraeli plays for Bam Khatoon F.C

Personal information
- Full name: Fatemeh Geraeli Sheikh
- Date of birth: 30 January 1999 (age 27)
- Place of birth: Qaem Shahr, Iran
- Position: Midfielder

Team information
- Current team: Bam Khatoon F.C
- Number: 77

Senior career*
Years	Team	Apps	(Gls)
- Bam Khatoon F.C

International career^{‡}
2012	Iran U13		(8)
2013	Iran U14		(1)
2013–2015	Iran U16		(10)
2014	Iran U19		(0)
2017	Iran	3	(0)
- * Club domestic league appearances and goals ‡ National team caps and goals as of 18 November 2018

Fatemeh Geraeli Sheikh (born 30 January 1999), known as Fatemeh Geraeli (Persian: فاطمه گرائیلی), is an Iranian footballer who plays as a midfielder for Kowsar Women Football League club Bam Khatoon F.C. She has been a member of the Iran women's national team.

== International goals ==
No.	Date	Venue	Opponent	Score	Result	Competition
1.	25 November 2018	Milliy Stadium, Tashkent, Uzbekistan	Afghanistan	6–0	6–0	2018 CAFA Women's Championship
