= 2013 AFC U-16 Women's Championship =

Tournament details
- Host country: China
- City: Nanjing
- Dates: 26 September – 6 October
- Teams: 12 (From 1 Confederation)
- Venue: Jiangning Sports Center

Final positions
- Champions: Japan (3rd title)
- Runners-up: North Korea
- Third place: China
- Fourth place: Thailand

Tournament statistics
- Top scorer: (Japan) Rikako Kobayashi (7 goals)
- Best player: (Japan) Hina Sugita
- Fair play award: North Korea

The 2013 AFC U-16 Women's Championship was the 5th edition of the tournament. The tournament was held from 26 September to 6 October 2013.

The tournament was played in Nanjing, China, just as the 2011 edition. The top three teams qualify for the 2014 FIFA U-17 Women's World Cup.

== Venues ==
Nanjing
Jiangning Sports Center	Jiangsu Football Training Centre Stadium
Capacity: 30,000	Capacity: 3,000
2013 AFC U-16 Women's Championship is located in China

== Qualification ==
Four teams were directly qualified by their 2011 performance, the others had to enter qualifying.

Country	Qualified as	Date qualification was secured
Japan	2011 AFC U-16 Women's Championship Champion	10 July 2012
North Korea	2011 AFC U-16 Women's Championship Runner-up	10 July 2012
China	2011 AFC U-16 Women's Championship Third Place, later confirmed as hosts	10 July 2012
South Korea	2011 AFC U-16 Women's Championship Fourth Place	10 July 2012
Chinese Taipei	Qualification Group D Winner	8 November 2012
Guam	Qualification Group D Runner-up	8 November 2012
Australia	Qualification Group C Winner	9 November 2012
Jordan	Qualification Group A Winner	9 November 2012
Bahrain	Qualification Group A Runner-up	9 November 2012
Thailand	Qualification Group C Runner-up	11 November 2012
Uzbekistan	Qualification Group B Winner	28 November 2012
Iran	Qualification Group B Runner-up	30 November 2012

== Format ==
The twelve teams are drawn into four groups of three teams. After playing each other once the group winner advances to the semi-finals. The draw was held on 26 April 2013.

If two or more teams are equal on points on completion of the group matches, the following criteria were applied to determine the rankings.

1. Greater number of points obtained in the group matches between the teams concerned;
2. Goal difference resulting from the group matches between the teams concerned;
3. Greater number of goals scored in the group matches between the teams concerned;
4. Goal difference in all the group matches;
5. Greater number of goals scored in all the group matches;
6. Kicks from the penalty mark if only two teams are involved and they are both on the field of play;
7. Fewer score calculated according to the number of yellow and red cards received in the group matches;
8. Drawing of lots.

== Group stage ==
All kick-off times are China Standard time (UTC+08:00).

=== Group A ===
Team	Pld	W	D	L	GF	GA	GD	Pts
China	2	2	0	0	19	0	+19	6
Australia	2	1	0	1	8	2	+6	3
Bahrain	2	0	0	2	0	25	−25	0

26 September 2013
16:30

Bahrain	0–17	China
	Report	Chen Yudan 3', 36'; Wu Yue 11', 19', 21'; Liu Yan 15', 32', 57', 68', 85'; Hessa Alzayani 46' (o.g.); Qin Manman 50', 51'; Cui Yuhan 53', 60', 89'; Shen Lufan 90+2'

Jiangning Sports Centre, Nanjing
Attendance: 200
Referee: Nami Sato (Japan)

28 September 2013
16:30

Australia	8–0	Bahrain
Rhianna Pollicina 19'; Madeline Stockdale 22'; Jessica Pitts 24'; Afrikah Mcgladrigan 35'; Sunny Franco 64', 74', 85'; Alexandra Chidiac 83'	Report

Jiangning Sports Centre, Nanjing
Attendance: 100
Referee: Kim Sookhee (South Korea)

30 September 2013
16:30

China	2–0	Australia
Cui Yuhan 31'; Fan Yuqiu 35'	Report

Jiangning Sports Centre, Nanjing
Attendance: 126
Referee: Fusako Kajiyama (Japan)

=== Group B ===
Team	Pld	W	D	L	GF	GA	GD	Pts
North Korea	2	2	0	0	16	0	+16	6
Chinese Taipei	2	1	0	1	2	11	−9	3
Jordan	2	0	0	2	1	8	−7	0

26 September 2013
14:00

Jordan	0–6	North Korea
	Report	Wi Jong-sim 10'; Mun Kyong-yong 21' (pen.); Ri Hae-yon 34', 45', 57'; Kim Pom-ui 67'

Jiangsu Football Training Centre Stadium, Nanjing
Attendance: 100
Referee: Edita Mirabidova (Uzbekistan)

28 September 2013
16:30

Chinese Taipei	2–1	Jordan
Pan Shin-yu 39'; Yang Chia-hui 42'	Report	Manar Mohammad 88'

Jiangning Sports Centre, Nanjing
Attendance: 50
Referee: Mai Hoang Trang (Vietnam)

30 September 2013
16:30

North Korea	10–0	Chinese Taipei
Ri Pom-hwang 8'; Wi Jong-sim 20', 24'; An Song-ok 22'; Sung Hyang-sim 39', 41', 85'; Kim Pom-ui 50'; Ri Hae-yon 54'; Ri Un-yong 77'	Report

Jiangsu Football Training Centre Stadium, Nanjing
Attendance: 50
Referee: Cong Thi Dung (Vietnam)

=== Group C ===
Team	Pld	W	D	L	GF	GA	GD	Pts
Thailand	2	1	1	0	5	2	+3	4
South Korea	2	0	2	0	2	2	0	2
Uzbekistan	2	0	1	1	0	3	−3	1

26 September 2013
16:30

Uzbekistan	0–0	South Korea
	Report

Jiangning Sports Centre, Nanjing
Attendance: 120
Referee: Cong Thi Dung (Vietnam)

28 September 2013
14:00

Thailand	3–0	Uzbekistan
Sojirat 15'; Sudarat 37'; Jiraporn 68'	Report

Jiangsu Football Training Centre Stadium, Nanjing
Attendance: 20
Referee: He Jin (China PR)

30 September 2013
14:00

South Korea	2–2	Thailand
Lee So-hee 67' (pen.), 85'	Report	Sudarat 80', 90+3'

Jiangsu Football Training Centre Stadium, Nanjing
Attendance: 50
Referee: Wang Jia (China PR)

=== Group D ===
Team	Pld	W	D	L	GF	GA	GD	Pts
Japan	2	2	0	0	28	0	+28	6
Iran	2	1	0	1	2	9	−7	3
Guam	2	0	0	2	0	21	−21	0

26 September 2013
14:00

Guam	0–19	Japan
	Report	Kamogawa 16', 18', 46'; Kobayashi 17', 20', 27', 37', 52'; Sugita 32', 40'; Kanda 39'; Kitagawa 55', 68', 72', 87'; Abe 59'; Kono 63'; Imai 75'; Miura 83'

Jiangsu Football Training Centre Stadium, Nanjing
Attendance: 100
Referee: Pannipar Kamnueng (Thailand)

28 September 2013
14:00

Iran	2–0	Guam
Shabnam Behesht 45+2'; Fatemeh Geraeli 55'	Report

Jiangning Sports Centre, Nanjing
Attendance: 55
Referee: Katherine Jacewicz (Australia)

30 September 2013
14:00

Japan	9–0	Iran
Nishida 4', 5'; Minami 10'; Kitagawa 12', 70'; Sugita 27'; Nagano 45+1', 90'; Kono 63'	Report

Jiangning Sports Centre, Nanjing
Attendance: 50
Referee: Edita Mirabidova (Uzbekistan)

== Knockout stage ==
Semi-finals
China	1
North Korea	3
Thailand	0
Japan	6

Final
North Korea	1 (5)
Japan	1 (6)
Third place
China	2 (4)
Thailand	2 (2)

=== Semifinals ===
3 October 2013
16:00

China	1–3	North Korea
Qin Manman 66'	Report	Ju Hyo-sim 35'; Ri Hae-yon 41', 83'

Jiangning Sports Centre, Nanjing
Attendance: 500
Referee: Kate Jacewicz (Australia)

3 October 2013
19:00

Thailand	0–6	Japan
	Report	Kobayashi 12', 63'; Sugita 31', 85', 90'; Kamogawa 88'

Jiangning Sports Centre, Nanjing
Attendance: 100
Referee: Kim Sookhee (South Korea)

=== Third place play-off ===
6 October 2013
16:00

China	2–2	Thailand
Liu Yan 18'; Wu Yue 90+4'	Report	Janthawan Thanakorn 49'; Sudarat 67'
Penalties
	4–2

Jiangning Sports Centre, Nanjing
Attendance: 100
Referee: Fusako Kajiyama (Japan)

=== Final ===
6 October 2013
19:00

North Korea	1–1	Japan
Sung Hyang-sim 71'	Report	Miura 63'
Penalties
	5–6

Jiangning Sports Centre, Nanjing
Attendance: 50
Referee: Wang Jia (China PR)

== Awards ==
The following awards were given.

Most Valuable Player	Top Scorer	Fair Play Award
(Japan) Hina Sugita	(Japan) Rikako Kobayashi (7 goals)	North Korea

Winners 2013 AFC U-16 Women's Championship

Japan
Third title

== Goalscorers ==
7 goals

- (Japan) Rikako Kobayashi

6 goals

- (China) Liu Yan
- (Japan) Hikaru Kitagawa
- (Japan) Hina Sugita
- (North Korea) Ri Hae-yon

4 goals

- (China) Cui Yuhan
- (China) Wu Yue
- (Japan) Miho Kamogawa
- (North Korea) Sung Hyang-sim
- (Thailand) Sudarat Chuchuen

3 goals

- (Australia) Sunny Franco
- (China) Qin Manman
- (North Korea) Wi Jong-sim

2 goals

- (China) Chen Yudan
- (Japan) Fuka Kono
- (Japan) Fuka Nagano
- (Japan) Meika Nishida
- (Japan) Narumi Miura
- (North Korea) Kim Pom-ui
- (South Korea) Lee So-hee

1 goals

- (Australia) Afrikah Mcgladrigan
- (Australia) Alexandra Chidiac
- (Australia) Jessica Pitts
- (Australia) Madeline Stockdale
- (Australia) Rhianna Pollicina
- (China) Fan Yuqiu
- (China) Shen Lufan
- (Iran) Fatemeh Geraeli
- (Iran) Shabnam Behesht
- (Jordan) Manar Mohammad Mahmoud Isleem
- (Japan) Moeka Minami
- (Japan) Yukiko Abe
- (Japan) Yurina Imai
- (Japan) Wakaho Kanda
- (North Korea) An Song-ok
- (North Korea) Ju Hyo-sim
- (North Korea) Mun Kyong-yong
- (North Korea) Ri Pom-hwang
- (North Korea) Ri Un-yong
- (Thailand) Janthawan Thanakorn
- (Thailand) Jiraporn
- (Thailand) Sojirat
- (Chinese Taipei) Pan Shin-yu
- (Chinese Taipei) Yang Chia-hui

Own goal

- (Bahrain) Hessa Alzayani (playing against China PR)
