= 2005 AFC U-17 Women's Championship =

Tournament details
- Host country: South Korea
- Dates: 16–27 April
- Teams: 11 (from 1 confederation)
- Venues: 2 (in 1 host city)

Final positions
- Champions: Japan (1st title)
- Runners-up: China
- Third place: Thailand
- Fourth place: South Korea

The 2005 AFC U-17 Women's Championship was the first instance of the AFC U-16 Women's Championship. It was held from 16 to 27 April 2005 in Namhae, South Korea.

== Venues ==
Namhae
Namhae Sports Park	Namhae Public Stadium
Capacity: 10,000	Capacity: 6,000

== Group stage ==
=== Group A ===
Team	Pld	W	D	L	GF	GA	GD	Pts
South Korea	3	3	0	0	25	2	+23	9
Thailand	3	2	0	1	19	7	+12	6
India	3	1	0	2	10	13	−3	3
Indonesia	3	0	0	3	0	32	−32	0

16 April 2005
14:00

South Korea	15–0	Indonesia
Choi Hae-sook 2', 37'; Jeon Ga-eul 9', 13', 21'; Park Ji-young 10', 66'; Kim Soo-jin 15', 39'; Kim Cho-hee 19'; Kwon Hah-nul 41'; Jung Won-jung 47', 52'; Park Cho-rong 80+1', 80+3'	Report

Namhae Sports Park, Namhae
Attendance: 3,500
Referee: Bentla D'Coth (India)

16 April 2005
16:00

Thailand	6–4	India
Sornsai 6', 71', 76'; Chawong 13'; Nampeng 17'; Peangthem 65'	Report	B. Devi 40+1', 41', 51'; Suganya 46'

Namhae Sports Park, Namhae
Attendance: 1,000
Referee: Sachiko Baba (Japan)

18 April 2005
14:10

India	0–7	South Korea
	Report	Kwon Hah-nul 28', 37'; Park Ji-young 35', 52'; Jeon Ga-eul 45'; Cho So-hyun 74'; Lee Ye-eun 79'

Namhae Sports Park, Namhae
Attendance: 2,000
Referee: Li Hong (China PR)

18 April 2005
16:10

Indonesia	0–11	Thailand
	Report	Thongchon 8', 55'; Nampeng 11'; Kertsombun 12'; Sornsai 22', 30', 38', 41', 66'; Panratsamee 24'; Ngoendi 73'

Namhae Sports Park, Namhae
Attendance: 1,500
Referee: Sachiko Baba (Japan)

20 April 2005
14:10

South Korea	3–2	Thailand
Lee Ye-eun 13'; Park Ji-young 46'; Yoo Young-a 70'	Report	Sornsai 31'; Chawong 75'

Namhae Sports Park, Namhae
Attendance: 2,000
Referee: Li Hong (China PR)

20 April 2005
16:10

India	6–0	Indonesia
B. Devi 26', 54'; Hmar 41'; Thangjam 52'; Chingtham 75'; Maibam 80+1'	Report

Namhae Sports Park, Namhae
Attendance: 500
Referee: Hong Eun-Ah (South Korea)

=== Group B ===
Team	Pld	W	D	L	GF	GA	GD	Pts
Japan	3	3	0	0	64	0	+64	9
Guam	3	1	1	1	1	18	−17	4
Hong Kong	3	1	1	1	3	24	−21	4
Bangladesh	3	0	0	3	2	28	−26	0

16 April 2005
14:00

Hong Kong	0–22	Japan
	Report	Hara 5', 30', 35'; Nagasato 6', 17', 23', 29', 39', 57'; Ono 19', 33', 38'; Ataeyama 32', 53'; Tanaka 45'; Kawamura 45', 62'; Uchibori 47', 56', 65'; Hori 80+2', 80+3'

Namhae Public Stadium, Namhae
Attendance: 1,000
Referee: Hong Eun-Ah (South Korea)

16 April 2005
16:00

Bangladesh	0–1	Guam
	Report	Atkinson 38'

Namhae Public Stadium, Namhae
Attendance: 1,000
Referee: Hsieh Li Chuan (Chinese Taipei)

18 April 2005
14:00

Japan	24–0	Bangladesh
Hara 5', 31', 37', 45', 49', 54', 70'; Hatsumi 11', 60'; Matsubara 19', 40'; Kakazu 24', 31', 71', 80+1'; Kawamura 36', 41+', 41+'; Hori 57', 61', 75', 76'; Ataeyama 65'; Akthar 73' (o.g.)	Report

Namhae Public Stadium, Namhae
Attendance: 300
Referee: Praew Semaksuk (Thailand)

18 April 2005
16:00

Guam	0–0	Hong Kong
	Report

Namhae Public Stadium, Namhae
Attendance: 300
Referee: Myint Daw San San (Myanmar)

20 April 2005
14:00

Guam	0–18	Japan
	Report	Tanaka 9', 57', 82'; Hara 22'; Ono 25', 43'; Hori 28', 38', 67'; Uchibori 40', 41', 80+1'; Ataeyama 45', 50'; Nagasato 59', 64', 69'; Kawamura 65'

Namhae Public Stadium, Namhae
Attendance: 1,000
Referee: Hsieh Li Chuan (Chinese Taipei)

20 April 2005
16:00

Hong Kong	3–2	Bangladesh
Yiu Hei Man 37'; Pinki 71' (o.g.); Cheung Wai Ki 80'	Report	Bolu 34'; Bagum 74'

Namhae Public Stadium, Namhae
Attendance: 500
Referee: Myint Daw San San (Myanmar)

=== Group C ===
Team	Pld	W	D	L	GF	GA	GD	Pts
China	2	2	0	0	34	0	+34	6
Chinese Taipei	2	1	0	1	7	7	0	3
Singapore	2	0	0	2	0	34	−34	0

17 April 2005
14:00

China	7–0	Chinese Taipei
Ma Xiaoxu 11', 14'; Li Lin 32', 38'; Li Nan 58', 76', 80+'	Report

Namhae Sports Park, Namhae
Attendance: 500
Referee: Han Kyung-Hwa (South Korea)

19 April 2005
14:00

Chinese Taipei	7–0	Singapore
Lin Man-Ting 19'; Lai Li-Chin 35', 56', 62', 76'; Hung Chia-Chun 38'; Chen Hsiao-Chuan 58'	Report

Namhae Sports Park, Namhae
Attendance: 1,000
Referee: Han Kyung-Hwa (South Korea)

21 April 2005
14:00

Singapore	0–27	China
	Report	Wang Ni 3'; Li Nan 4', 13', 30', 38', 42', 46'; Li Wen 6', 15'; Lu Aixue 11', 44', 69'; Li Lin 14', 18', 20', 49', 68', 80', 80+1'; Joleen 24' (o.g.); Mao Aihong 36', 70'; He Zhen 40', 71'; Wang Lingling 73'; Xu Wenjia 75'; Thangarajoo 77' (o.g.)

Namhae Sports Park, Namhae
Attendance: 2,000
Referee: Praew Semaksuk (Thailand)

=== Ranking of second-placed teams ===
Group	Team	Pld	W	D	L	GF	GA	GD	Pts
A	Thailand	2	1	0	1	8	7	+1	3
C	Chinese Taipei	2	1	0	1	7	7	0	3
B	Guam	2	0	1	1	0	18	−18	1

- Note: Group A and B's match against fourth-placed team was excluded.

== Knockout stage ==
=== Bracket ===
Semi-finals
24 April
South Korea	0
Japan	4
24 April
China	6
Thailand	0

Final
27 April
Japan	1(3)
China	1(1)
Third place match
27 April
South Korea	1
Thailand	2

=== Semi-finals ===
24 April 2005
14:00

South Korea	0–4	Japan
	Report	Nagasato 46', 52'; Ataeyama 64'; Hori 78'

Namhae Sports Park, Namhae
Attendance: 4,000
Referee: Bentla D'Coth (India)

24 April 2005
16:45

China	6–0	Thailand
Ma Xiaoxu 9', 16', 74', 77'; Sarian 29' (o.g.); Li Lin 46'	Report

Namhae Sports Park, Namhae
Attendance: 1,000
Referee: Myint Daw San San (Myanmar)

=== Third place match ===
27 April 2005
14:00

South Korea	1–2	Thailand
Jung Won-jung 68'	Report	Chawong 17'; Peangthem 65'

Namhae Sports Park, Namhae
Attendance: 1,500
Referee: Li Hong (China PR)

=== Final ===
27 April 2005
16:30

Japan	1–1 (a.e.t.)	China
Hara 51'	Report	Ma Xiaoxu 41'
Penalties
	3–1

Namhae Sports Park, Namhae
Attendance: 2,500
Referee: Praew Semaksuk (Thailand)

== Winners ==
2005 AFC U-17 Women's Championship

Japan
First title

== Goalscorers ==
12 goals

- (Japan) Natsuko Hara

11 goals

- (Japan) Asano Nagasato

10 goals

- (China) Li Lin
- (Japan) Yoshie Hori

9 goals

- (China) Li Nan
- (Thailand) Pitsamai Sornsai

7 goals

- (China) Ma Xiaoxu

6 goals

- (Japan) Konomi Ataeyama
- (Japan) Mari Kawamura
- (Japan) Ritsuko Uchibori

5 goals

- (India) Ngangom Bala Devi
- (Japan) Hitomi Ono
- (South Korea) Park Ji-young

4 goals

- (Japan) Asuka Kakazu
- (Japan) Asuna Tanaka
- (South Korea) Jeon Ga-eul
- (Chinese Taipei) Lai Li-Chin

3 goals

- (China) Lu Aixue
- (South Korea) Jung Won-jung
- (South Korea) Kwon Hah-nul
- (Thailand) Thanatta Chawong

2 goals

- (China) He Zhen
- (China) Li Wen
- (China) Mao Aihong
- (Japan) Naomi Hatsumi
- (Japan) Megumi Matsubara
- (South Korea) Choi Hae-sook
- (South Korea) Kim Soo-jin
- (South Korea) Lee Ye-eun
- (South Korea) Park Cho-rong
- (Thailand) Prangthip Nampeng
- (Thailand) Sukunya Peangthem
- (Thailand) Uthumphon Thongchon

1 goal

- (Bangladesh) Hasina Bagum
- (Bangladesh) Rouson Bolu
- (China) Wang Lingling
- (China) Wang Ni
- (China) Xu Wenjia
- (Guam) Amy Atkinson
- (Hong Kong) Cheung Wai Ki
- (Hong Kong) Yiu Hei Man
- (India) Chanu Sanathoi Chingtham
- (India) Maibam Bembem Devi
- (India) Lalvarmoi Hmar
- (India) Suganya Raju
- (India) Ranjita Devi Thangjam
- (South Korea) Cho So-hyun
- (South Korea) Kim Cho-hee
- (South Korea) Yoo Young-a
- (Chinese Taipei) Chen Hsiao-Chuan
- (Chinese Taipei) Hung Chia-Chun
- (Chinese Taipei) Lin Man-Ting
- (Thailand) Wajee Kertsombun
- (Thailand) Phumphuang Ngoendi
- (Thailand) Sasima Panratsamee

Own goal

- (Bangladesh) Ayesha Akthar (for Japan)
- (Bangladesh) Shameema Pinki (for Hong Kong)
- (Singapore) Joleen Tan (for China)
- (Singapore) Suhanthi Thangarajoo (for China)
- (Thailand) Sirirat Sarian (for China)

== See also ==
- 2002 AFC U-19 Women's Championship
