= Sudarat Chuchuen =

Thai footballer (born 1997)

Personal information
- Date of birth: 19 June 1997 (age 29)
- Place of birth: Sisaket, Thailand
- Height: 1.64 m (5 ft 5 in)
- Position: Defender

Senior career*
Years	Team	Apps	(Gls)
–2023	BG Bundit Asia		

International career
	Thailand	12	(0)
- * Club domestic league appearances and goals

Sudarat Chuchuen (Thai: สุดารัตน์ ชูชื่น; born 19 June 1997) is a Thai footballer who plays as a defender for the Thailand women's national team.

She was selected for the 2019 FIFA Women's World Cup.

== International goals ==
No.	Date	Venue	Opponent	Score	Result	Competition
1.	27 May 2018	Gelora Sriwijaya Stadium, Palembang, Indonesia	Indonesia	13–0	13–0	Friendly
2.	4 July 2018	Bumi Sriwijaya Stadium, Palembang, Indonesia	Cambodia	4–0	11–0	2018 AFF Women's Championship
3.	6 July 2018	Bumi Sriwijaya Stadium, Palembang, Indonesia	Malaysia	1–0	8–0	2018 AFF Women's Championship
4.	6 July 2018	Bumi Sriwijaya Stadium, Palembang, Indonesia	Malaysia	6–0	8–0	2018 AFF Women's Championship
