= Guam women's national under-17 football team =

Guamanian women's football team

Guam Women's U-17
- Nickname: Masakåda
- Association: Guam Football Association
- Confederation: AFC (Asia)
- Sub-confederation: EAFF (East Asia)
- Head coach: (Guam) Kim Sherman
- Captain: Lauren Phillips
- Home stadium: GFA National Training Center
- FIFA code: GUM
First colors	Second colors

First international
- Bangladesh 0–1 Guam (Namhae, South Korea; 16 April 2005)

Biggest win
- Timor-Leste 0–4 Guam (Makati, Philippines; 15 October 2010)

Biggest defeat
- Guam 0–20 China (Colombo, Sri Lanka; 17 September 2018)

AFC U-17 Women's Asian Cup
- Appearances: 2 (first in 2005)
- Best result: Group stage (2005, 2013)

The Guam women's national under-17 football team is the representative football team for Guam at the age of women's under-17 . The team plays at the AFC U-17 Women's Asian Cup. They have yet to qualified in the FIFA U-17 Women's World Cup.

== Team image ==
=== Nicknames ===
The Guam women's national under-17 football team has been known or nicknamed as the Masakåda.

=== Home stadium ===
Guam plays their home matches on the GFA National Training Center and others stadiums.

== History ==
The Guam women's national under-17 football team have played their debut game on 16 April 2005 at Namhae, South Korea versus Bangladesh which won by 1-0 goal. The team have qualified two times in the AFC U-17 Women's Asian Cup first in 2005 and second in 2013 both of are finished in the group stages. The nation have not yet qualified in the FIFA U-17 Women's World Cup.

== Current squad ==
The following squad was announced for 2019 AFC U-16 Women's Championship qualification.

As of 20 February 2018

No.	Pos.	Player	Date of birth (age)	Caps	Goals	Club
1	GK	Kiarra Hutcherson	5 June 2004	0	0	(Guam Football Association)
2	MF	Rylee Guzman	13 January 2004	0	0	(Guam Football Association)
3	DF	Samantha Kenney	9 November 2004	0	0	(Guam Football Association)
4	DF	Lola Martin	20 May 2004	0	0	(Guam Football Association)
5	DF	Kaia Malakooti	21 February 2004	0	0	(Guam Football Association)
6	DF	Olivia Leon Guerrero	3 February 2004	0	0	(Guam Football Association)
7	MF	Jada Han	29 December 2004	0	0	(Guam Football Association)
8	FW	Yesmin Lopez	4 June 2004	0	0	(Guam Football Association)
9	FW	Jinae Teria	10 September 2004	0	0	(Guam Football Association)
10	FW	Jaydn Palomares	3 August 2004	0	0	(Guam Football Association)
11	FW	Lauren Phillips (Captain)	7 January 2004	0	0	(Guam Football Association)
12	DF	Candie Cura	4 September 2004	0	0	(Guam Football Association)
13	MF	Olivia Haddock	23 February 2006	0	0	(Guam Football Association)
14	MF	Maria Taitano	12 November 2004	0	0	(Guam Football Association)
15	MF	Kini Arroyo	18 May 2004	0	0	(Guam Football Association)
16	MF	Annika Almario	3 January 2004	0	0	(Guam Football Association)
17	FW	Isabella Clement	19 May 2004	0	0	(Guam Football Association)
18	GK	Haley Salas	29 December 2004	0	0	(Guam Football Association)
19	FW	Cassandra Kido	8 November 2004	0	0	(Guam Football Association)
20	GK	Anna George Jones	20 September 2005	0	0	(Guam Football Association)
21	MF	Samantha Santos	30 March 2005	0	0	(Guam Football Association)
22	FW	Danni Jo Santos	28 March 2004	0	0	(Guam Football Association)
23	GK	Gabrielle Moser	15 September 2005	0	0	(Guam Football Association)

== Fixtures and results ==
Legend

Win Draw Loss Fixtures

== Competitive records ==
Champions Runners-up Third place Fourth place

=== FIFA U-17 Women's World Cup ===
FIFA U-17 Women's World Cup record
Year	Result	Position	Pld	W	D	L	GF	GA
(New Zealand) 2008	Did not qualify							
(Trinidad and Tobago) 2010	Did not qualify							
(Azerbaijan) 2012	Did not qualify							
(Costa Rica) 2014	Did not qualify							
(Jordan) 2016	Did not qualify							
(Uruguay) 2018	Did not qualify							
(India) 2022	Did not qualify							
(Dominican Republic) 2024	Did not qualify							
(Morocco) 2025	Did not qualify							
(Morocco) 2026	Did not qualify							
(Morocco) 2027	Did not qualify							
Total	0/9	0 Titles	0	0	0	0	0	0

*Draws include knockout matches decided on penalty kicks.

=== AFC U-17 Women's Asian Cup ===
AFC U-17 Women's Asian Cup record
Year	Round	Position	MP	W	D*	L	GF	GA
(Japan) 2005	Group stages	–	3	1	1	1	1	18
(Malaysia) 2007 to (China) 2011	Did not enter							
(China) 2013	Group stages	–	2	0	0	2	0	21
(China) 2015	Did not enter							
(Thailand) 2017	Did not qualify							
(Thailand) 2019	Did not qualify							
(Indonesia) ~~2022~~	Cancelled							
(Indonesia) 2024	Did not qualify							
(China) 2026	Did not qualify							
(China) 2027	Did not qualify							
Total	2/8	–	5	1	1	3	1	49

*Draws include knockout matches decided on penalty kicks.

=== AFC U-17 Women's Asian Cup qualification ===
AFC U-17 Women's Championship qualification record
Year	Round	Position	MP	W	D*	L	GF	GA
(Japan) 2005	Directly enter							
(Malaysia) 2007	Did not enter							
(Thailand) 2009	Did not enter							
(China) 2011	DNQ	–	4	3	0	1	8	6
(China) 2013	QFD	–	2	1	0	1	1	9
(China) 2015	Did not enter							
(Thailand) 2017	DNQ	–	4	0	0	4	2	33
(Thailand) 2019	DNQ	–	4	1	0	3	5	34
(Indonesia) ~~2022~~	Cancelled							
(Indonesia) 2024	DNQ	–	2	0	0	2	3	8
Total	2/9	–	16	4	0	11	19	90

*Draws include knockout matches decided on penalty kicks.
