= BRICS U-17 Football Cup =

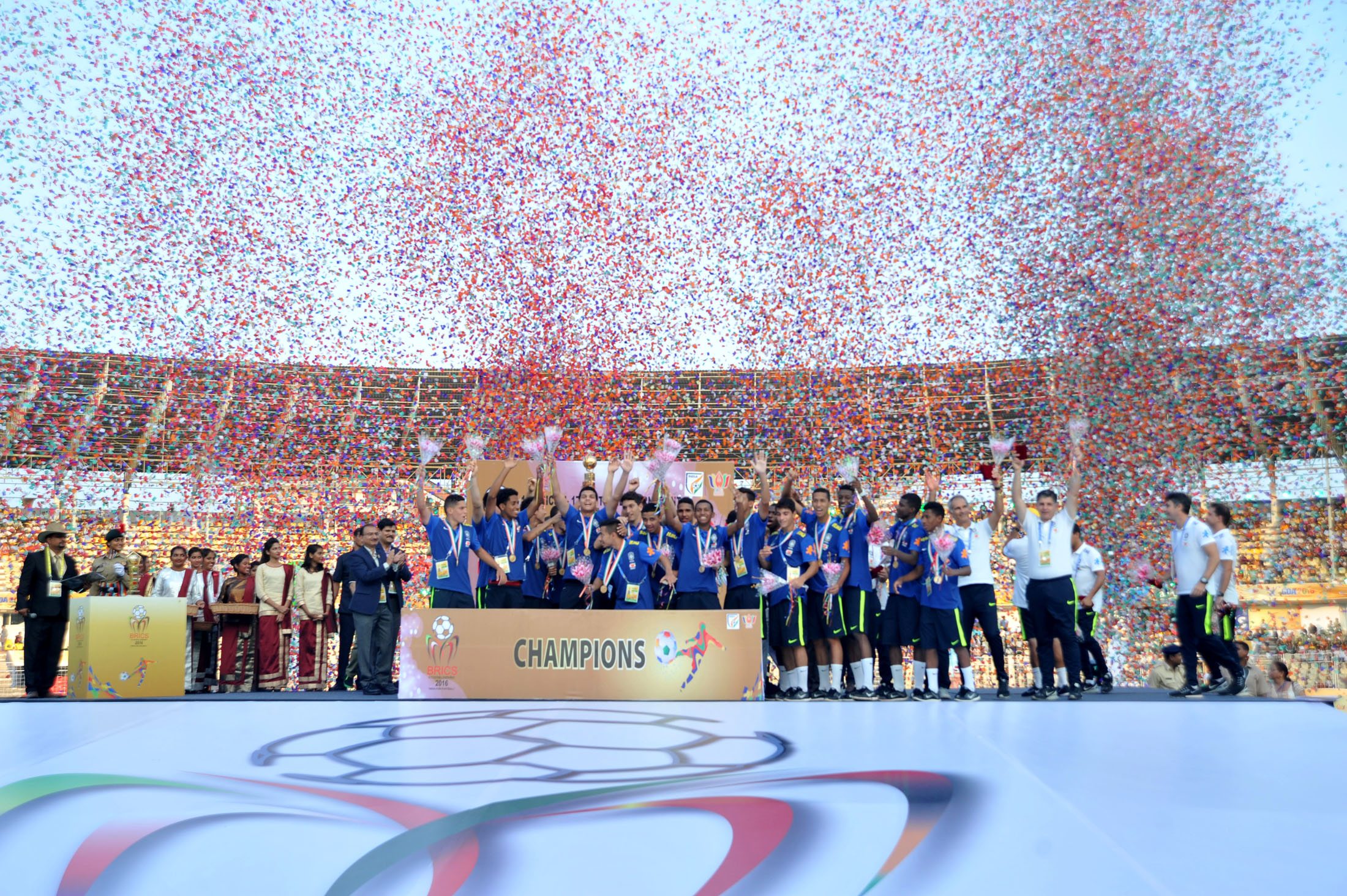
- Brazilian team celebrating with the trophy at the Pandit Jawaharlal Nehru Stadium in 2016
- Founded: 2016
- Region: BRICS Nations
- Teams: 5 Brazil; Russia; India; China; South Africa
- Current champions: Brazil (2nd title)
- Most championships: Brazil (2 titles)
- Website: www.bricsfootballcup.com.br

The BRICS U-17 Football Cup is a U-17 Football tournament played among teams of five BRICS countries - economic block formed by Brazil, Russia, India, China and South Africa. The first historic edition was played in Goa, India in 2016 on the occasion of the 8th BRICS summit that was held in India. The Tournament will take place once every year with 10-day and following the lines of the tournaments under-17 FIFA. Each edition will be held in a BRICS nation. On 1 October 2016 The Prime Minister of India Shri Narendra Modi, unveiled the Trophy for the 2016 BRICS U-17 Football Tournament in London.

Brics Football Cup was not held in 2017 during the Xiamen Summit, but the tournament come back for the second edition for Johannesburg Summit, 2018. In this edition Women's U-17 teams of respective countries competed for the cup.

== Format ==
On the very first tournament, held in Goa, India a round-robin stage was played. From this round, 1st and 2nd teams of points table entered final and on the other hand 3rd and 4th teams of points table entered 3rd place game respectively. 5th team was directly eliminated after first round.

In the second edition, only round-robin stage was played in Johannesburg, South Africa. The teams were given awards according to their places in points table after round-robin stage.

== Teams ==
Team	Confederation
Brazil	CONMEBOL
China	AFC
India	AFC
Russia	UEFA
South Africa	CAF

== Results ==
Season	Host country	Final match date	Winner	Final match result	Runners-up	Third place	Highest goal scorer
2016	India	15 October 2016	Brazil	5–1	South Africa	Russia	(Brazil) Vinícius Júnior (4 goals)
2018	South Africa	22 July 2018	Brazil	‡	China	South Africa	

‡ There was no knock-out match played, the tournament was played as league tournament, team with highest point won the cup, in this case Brazil.

== Team performance ==
Hosts→ Teams↓	2016 (India)	2018 (South Africa)	Apps.
Brazil	1st	1st	2
Russia	3rd	4th	2
India	5th	5th	2
China PR	4th	2nd	2
South Africa	2nd	3rd	2

== See also ==
- BRICS Games
