= 2016 BRICS U-17 Football Cup =

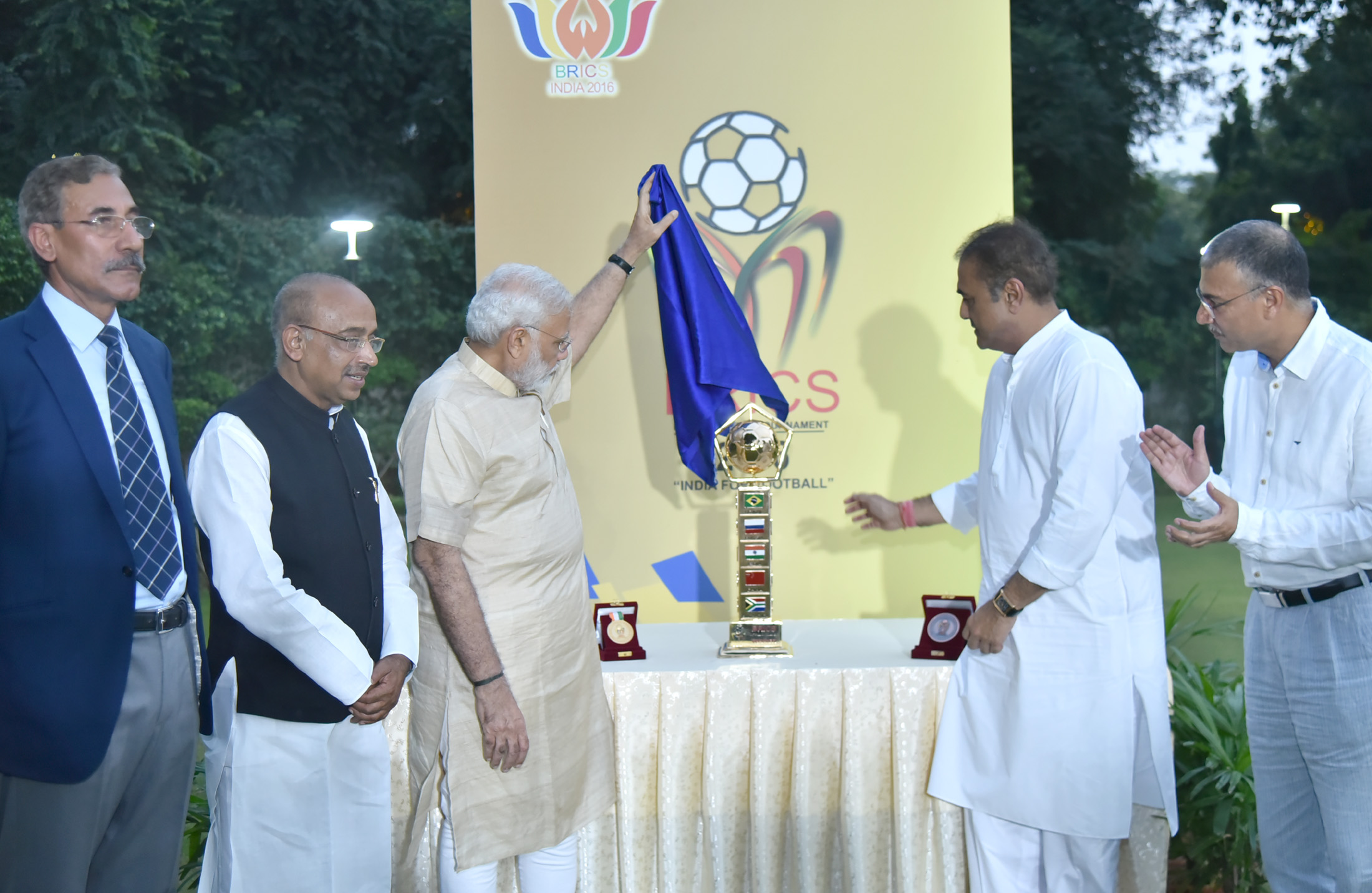
- Prime Minister of India, Narendra Modi, unveiling the trophy in New Delhi, 2016.

Tournament details
- Host country: India
- Dates: 5–15 October 2016
- Teams: 5 (from BRICS confederations)
- Venue: 2 (in 2 host cities)

Final positions
- Champions: Brazil (1st title)
- Runners-up: South Africa
- Third place: Russia
- Fourth place: China

Tournament statistics
- Matches played: 12
- Goals scored: 32 (2.67 per match)

The 2016 BRICS U-17 Football Cup was the first edition of the BRICS U-17 Football Cup. It took place in the Indian state of Goa during the 8th BRICS summit which was also held in India. It began on 5 October and concluded with the final on 15 October. Brazil won the cup defeating South Africa in the final. The tournament featured the under-17 teams of all five members of BRICS with the final taking place at the Pandit Jawaharlal Nehru Stadium.

== Teams ==
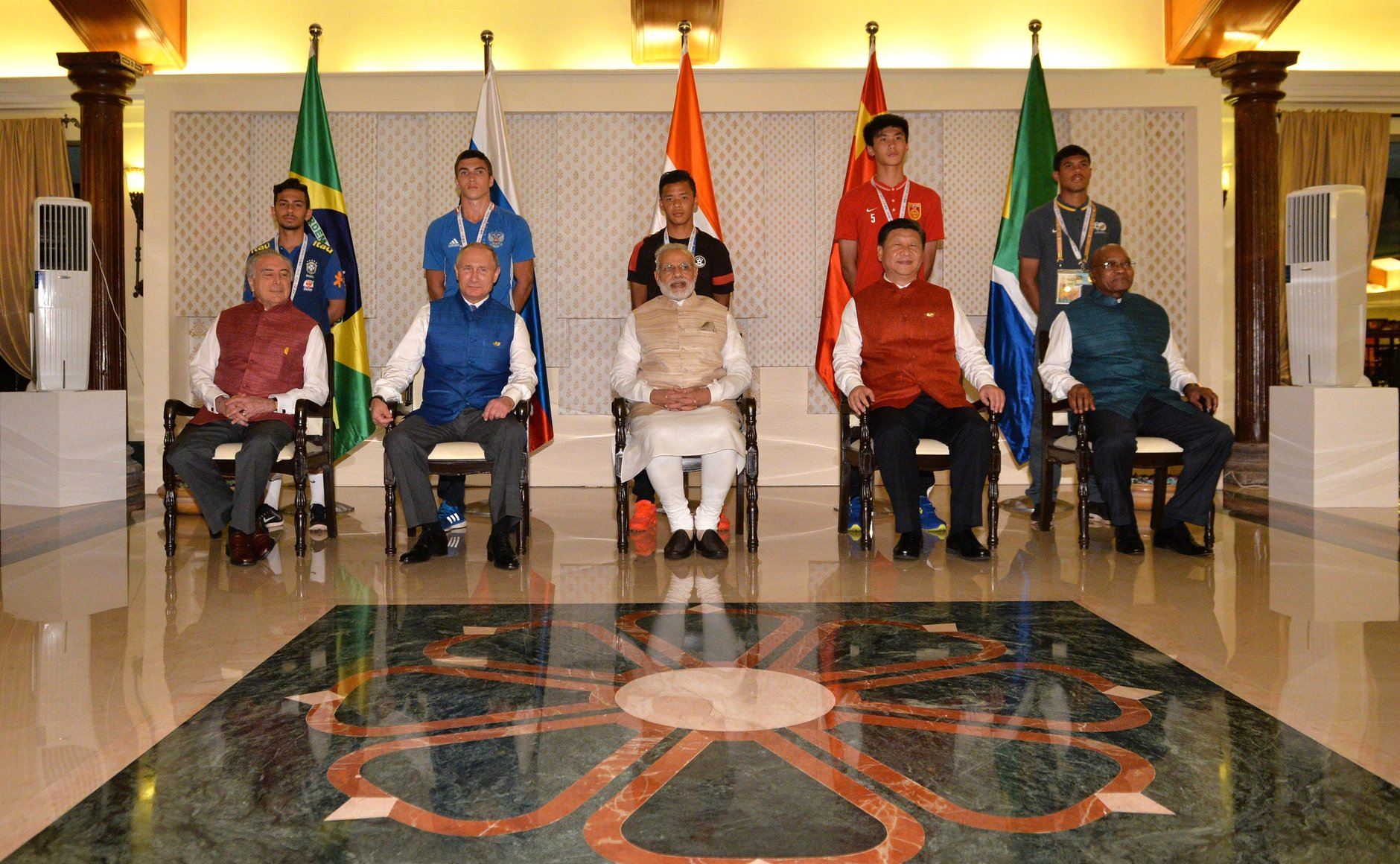
BRICS leaders with captains of the U-17 football teams.

Team	Confederation
Brazil	CONMEBOL
China	AFC
India	AFC
Russia	UEFA
South Africa	CAF

== Venues ==
Margao	2016 BRICS U-17 Football Cup (India)
Pandit Jawaharlal Nehru Stadium	2016 BRICS U-17 Football Cup (India)
Capacity: 19,000	2016 BRICS U-17 Football Cup (India)
Bambolim	2016 BRICS U-17 Football Cup (India)
GMC Athletic Stadium	2016 BRICS U-17 Football Cup (India)
Capacity: 3,600	2016 BRICS U-17 Football Cup (India)

== Format ==
All five teams in the tournament shall play each other in a round-robin before the top two teams qualify for the final and the third and fourth place teams play in the third-place match.

== Group stage ==
=== Table ===
Pos	Team	Pld	W	D	L	GF	GA	GD	Pts	Qualification
1	Brazil	4	4	0	0	10	1	+9	12	Final
2	South Africa	4	2	1	1	4	4	0	7	Final
3	Russia	4	2	0	2	6	6	0	6	Third place match
4	China	4	1	1	2	2	6	−4	4	Third place match
5	India	4	0	0	4	1	6	−5	0	

Source: BRICS U-17
Rules for classification: 1) points; 2) goal difference; 3) goals scored; 4) head-to-head result .

=== Fixtures & results ===
5 October 2016
16:00 IST

China	0–2	Brazil
	Report	Gabriel 1'; Matos 65'

GMC Athletic Stadium, Bambolim
5 October 2016
20:00 IST

Russia	1–0	India
Lopatin 3'	Report

GMC Athletic Stadium, Bambolim

7 October 2016
16:00 IST

South Africa	1–0	India
Radzilani 23'	Report

GMC Athletic Stadium, Bambolim
7 October 2016
20:00 IST

China	1–4	Russia
Qianglong 90'	Report	Kolesnichenko 6', 69'; Lopatin 60', 74'

GMC Athletic Stadium, Bambolim

9 October 2016
16:00 IST

Brazil	2–0	Russia
Victor Oliviera 38'; Vinícius Júnior 78'	Report

GMC Athletic Stadium, Bambolim
9 October 2016
20:00 IST

South Africa	0–0	China
	Report

GMC Athletic Stadium, Bambolim

11 October 2016
16:00 IST

India	0–1	China
	Report	Cong 90+5'

GMC Athletic Stadium, Bambolim
11 October 2016
20:00 IST

Brazil	3–0	South Africa
Nestor 8'; Franco 74'; Vinícius Júnior 82'	Report

GMC Athletic Stadium, Bambolim

13 October 2016
16:00 IST

Russia	1–3	South Africa
Skrobotov 45'	Report	Foster 22'; Mavuso 54'; Le Roux 84'

GMC Athletic Stadium, Bambolim
13 October 2016
20:00 IST

India	1–3	Brazil
Thatal 19'	Report	Brenner 2'; Santos 30'; Vinícius Júnior 82'

GMC Athletic Stadium, Bambolim

== Final and Third place match ==
=== Third-place match ===
15 October 2016
10:00 IST

Russia	2–1	China
Kolesnichenko 66'; Chelidze 84'	Report	Qianglong 34'

Pandit Jawaharlal Nehru Stadium, Margao

=== Final ===
15 October 2016
15:30 IST

Brazil	5–1	South Africa
Paulinho 24'; Vinícius Júnior 35'; Victor Oliveira 40', 60'; Alan de Souza 90+3'	Report	Bophela 89'

Pandit Jawaharlal Nehru Stadium, Margao

== Winner ==
2016 BRICS U-17 Football Cup

Brazil
First title

== Goalscorers ==
4 goals

- (Brazil) Vinícius Júnior

3 goals

- (Brazil) Victor Oliviera
- (Russia) Kirill Kolesnichenko
- (Russia) Daniil Lopatin

2 goals

- (China) Tao Qianglong

1 goal

- (China) Cong
- (Brazil) Alan de Souza
- (Brazil) Paulinho
- (Brazil) Leonardo Franco
- (Brazil) Victor Gabriel
- (Brazil) Vitor Matos
- (Brazil) Rodrigo Nestor
- (Brazil) Vinicius Oliviera
- (Brazil) Marcos Santos
- (Brazil) Brenner
- (India) Komal Thatal
- (Russia) Georgy Chelidze
- (South Africa) Bophela
- (South Africa) Lyle Foster
- (South Africa) Luke Le Roux
- (South Africa) Mswati Mavuso
- (South Africa) Ndamalelo Radzilani
