= 2018 BRICS U-17 Football Cup =

Tournament details
- Host country: South Africa
- Dates: 18–22 July 2018
- Teams: 5 (from BRICS confederations)
- Venue: 1 (in 1 host city)

Final positions
- Champions: Brazil
- Runners-up: China
- Third place: South Africa
- Fourth place: Russia

Tournament statistics
- Matches played: 10
- Goals scored: 39 (3.9 per match)

The 2018 BRICS U-17 Football Cup was the second edition of the BRICS U-17 Football Cup. It took place under the 2018 BRICS Games in Johannesburg, South Africa during the 10th BRICS summit which was held in South Africa. It had begun on 18 July and concluded with the final on 22 July. The tournament featured the women's under-17 teams of all five members of BRICS making it first women's under 17 tournament between BRICS nation. Brazil topped the group and win the tournament on basis of match points as it was organised as league tournament. This was Brazil second BRICS cup title as they had also won men's edition in 2016.

== Teams ==
Team	Confederation
Brazil	CONMEBOL
China	AFC
India	AFC
Russia	UEFA
South Africa	CAF

== Venues ==
The tournament held at Wits Rugby Stadium in Johannesburg, South Africa.

== Format ==
All five teams in the tournament played each other in a round-robin once.

== Group stage ==
=== Table ===
Pos	Team	Pld	W	D	L	GF	GA	GD	Pts
1	Brazil	4	3	1	0	13	1	+12	10
2	China	4	3	0	1	9	6	+3	9
3	South Africa	4	1	2	1	8	5	+3	5
4	Russia	4	1	1	2	6	12	−6	4
5	India	4	0	0	4	3	15	−12	0

Source: BRICS U-17
Rules for classification: 1) points; 2) goal difference; 3) goals scored; 4) head-to-head result .

=== Matches ===
18 July 2018
SAST

Brazil	3–1	China

Wits Rugby Stadium, Johannesburg
18 July 2018
SAST

South Africa	5−1	India
	Report	Vanlalhriattiri 40'

Wits Rugby Stadium, Johannesburg

19 July 2018
SAST

Brazil	0–0	South Africa

Wits Rugby Stadium, Johannesburg
19 July 2018
SAST

India	1−3	Russia
Guguloth 6'	Report

Wits Rugby Stadium, Johannesburg

20 July 2018
SAST

Russia	0−5	Brazil

Wits Rugby Stadium, Johannesburg
20 July 2018
SAST

South Africa	1−2	China

Wits Rugby Stadium, Johannesburg

21 July 2018
SAST

Russia	1−4	China

Wits Rugby Stadium, Johannesburg
21 July 2018
SAST

India	0−5	Brazil
	Report

Wits Rugby Stadium, Johannesburg

22 July 2018
SAST

South Africa	2–2	Russia

Wits Rugby Stadium, Johannesburg
22 July 2018
SAST

China	2−1	India
	Report	Manisha 25'

Wits Rugby Stadium, Johannesburg
