= Vinícius Júnior =

Brazilian footballer (born 2000)

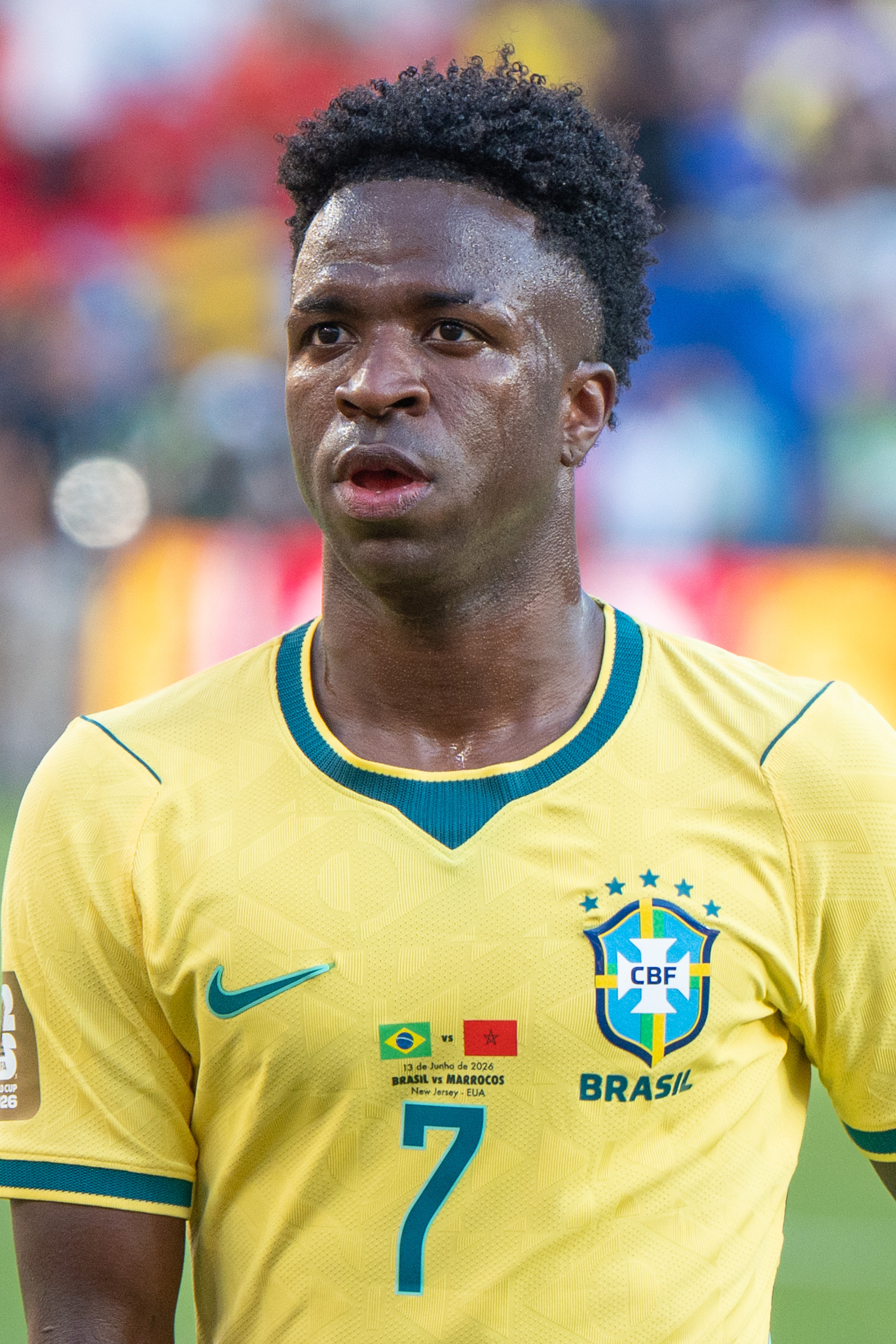
- Vinícius with Brazil in 2026

Personal information
- Full name: Vinícius José Paixão de Oliveira Júnior
- Date of birth: 12 July 2000 (age 26)
- Place of birth: São Gonçalo, Rio de Janeiro, Brazil
- Height: 1.76 m (5 ft 9 in)
- Positions: Forward; left winger

Team information
- Current team: Real Madrid
- Number: 7

Youth career
- 2006–2017: Flamengo

Senior career*
Years	Team	Apps	(Gls)
2017–2018	Flamengo	50	(11)
2018	Real Madrid B	5	(4)
2018–	Real Madrid	251	(78)

International career^{‡}
2015–2016	Brazil U15	10	(7)
2016–2017	Brazil U17	19	(17)
2018–2019	Brazil U20	4	(0)
2019–	Brazil	59	(19)
Medal record
Men's football
Representing Brazil
Copa América
Runner-up	2021 Brazil
South American U-17 Championship
Winner	2017 Chile
South American U-15 Championship
Winner	2015 Colombia
- * Club domestic league appearances and goals as of 22:07, 21 November 2026 (UTC) ‡ National team caps and goals as of 12:23, 17 November 2026 (UTC)

Vinícius José Paixão de Oliveira Júnior (Brazilian Portuguese: [viˈnisjuz ʒoˈzɛ pajˈʃɐ̃w̃ dʒi oliˈvejɾɐ ˈʒunjoʁ]; born 12 July 2000), known mononymously as Vinícius, is a Brazilian professional footballer who plays as a forward for La Liga club Real Madrid and the Brazil national team.

Born in São Gonçalo, Vinícius began his professional career at Flamengo, where he made his senior debut in 2017, at age 16. A few weeks later, Vinícius was the subject of a transfer to La Liga club Real Madrid, for whom he signed in a £38 million deal, which was a national record for a player under 18. The transfer was made effective after his 18th birthday, with Vinícius debuting for the club in 2018–19. Over the following seasons, Vinícius established himself as a prominent member in Real Madrid's squad, helping the club win two La Liga–Champions League doubles, scoring the winning goal in the 2022 final, as well as the second goal in the 2024 final, being named the tournament's Player of the Season in 2024. Vinícius was included in the FIFPRO World 11 in 2023 and 2024, and was named The Best FIFA Men's Player in 2024. He also finished runner-up in the 2024 Ballon d'Or voting.

At his youth stage for Brazil, Vinícius was a key player in the victory at the 2015 South American U-15 Championship and 2017 South American U-17 Championship, finishing as the leading goalscorer in the latter competition. He made his senior debut in 2021 and helped his nation to a runner-up finish at the 2021 Copa América, also representing Brazil at the 2022 FIFA World Cup in Qatar and the 2024 Copa América and 2026 World Cup, both in the United States.

== Club career ==
=== Early career ===
His footballing career began in 2006, when his father took him to the branch offices of Flamengo, in the neighborhood of Mutuá, in São Gonçalo, where he lived. His club document described him as a left-back.

Hailing from a poor Catholic family, Vinícius went to live in Abolição with his uncle, Ulisses, to shorten the distance to Ninho do Urubu (the "Vultures' Nest"). He started to receive financial aid from Flamengo as well as aid from entrepreneurs.

Between 2007 and 2010, Vinícius attended futsal classes at Flamengo's school in São Gonçalo at the Canto do Rio, a famous club located in the centre of Niterói. Flamengo noted his potential, and he decided he wanted to play football, not futsal. In August 2010, Vinícius had a trial to play for the Flamengo youth team, and he accepted an invitation to play for their football team. Before, in 2009, when Vinícius was nine, he took a futsal trial for Flamengo, he was asked to come back the following year.

=== Flamengo ===
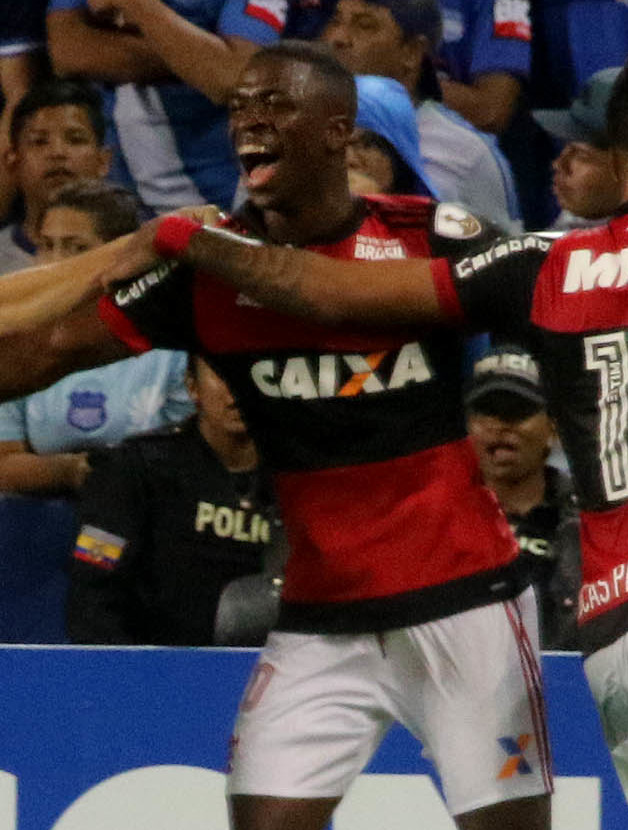
Vinícius playing for Flamengo in 2018

Vinícius debuted for Flamengo on 13 May 2017 as an 82nd-minute substitute in a Brazilian Série A 1–1 draw against Atlético Mineiro. Two days later, he extended his contract with the club from 2019 until 2022, with a significant salary increase and a buyout clause increase from €30 million to €45 million. This contract renewal was reported as being part of the transfer process of Vinícius to Real Madrid, an agreement reached between the two clubs in Gávea that week with an obligation to sell the young player in July 2018.

On 10 August 2017, Vinícius scored the first professional goal of his career in a Copa Sudamericana second round leg 2 match against Palestino in a 5–0 win for Flamengo. He scored one goal, 30 seconds after being substituted on in the 72nd minute. On 19 August, he scored his first Brazilian Série A goals for Flamengo, in a 2–0 win against Atlético Goianiense.

=== Real Madrid ===
On 23 May 2017, La Liga club Real Madrid signed a contract to acquire Vinícius, effective after his 18th birthday on 12 July 2018 (as age 18 is the minimum age for international transfer). He transferred for a reported fee of €46 million, which was at the time, the second most expensive sale of a player in the history of Brazilian football (behind only Neymar), the largest amount received by a Brazilian club for a transfer, and the highest amount ever paid by a club for a footballer under the age of 19. He was originally scheduled to return to Brazil on loan in July 2018.

==== 2018–21: Development and adaptation in Spain ====
On 20 July 2018, he was officially presented as a Real Madrid player. He was issued squad number 28. He made his debut on 29 September, coming in as an 87th-minute substitute in a goalless draw against Atlético Madrid. Vinícius made his first start on 31 October in a 4–0 Copa del Rey away victory against Melilla, contributing with assists for both Marco Asensio and Álvaro Odriozola in what Marca recognised as a Man of the Match performance. He scored his first goal on 3 November 10 minutes after coming on as a substitute in a 2–0 victory against Real Valladolid. He scored four goals between his debut on 29 September and 7 February 2019. On 6 March, he tore a ligament during a loss to Ajax, which ended his season.

On 11 December 2019, he scored his first UEFA Champions League goal in a 3–1 away win over Club Brugge in the 2019–20 season. On 1 March 2020, he scored the first goal in a 2–0 win for Real in El Clásico against Barcelona. He made 29 appearances during the league season, while scoring three goals, as Real Madrid won the 2019–20 La Liga. On 6 April 2021, Vinícius scored two goals in a 3–1 win against Liverpool in the first leg of the 2020–21 UEFA Champions League quarter-finals. Real Madrid would advance to the semi-finals where they lost to eventual champions Chelsea.

==== 2021–22: Breakthrough, second league title, and UEFA Champions League victory ====
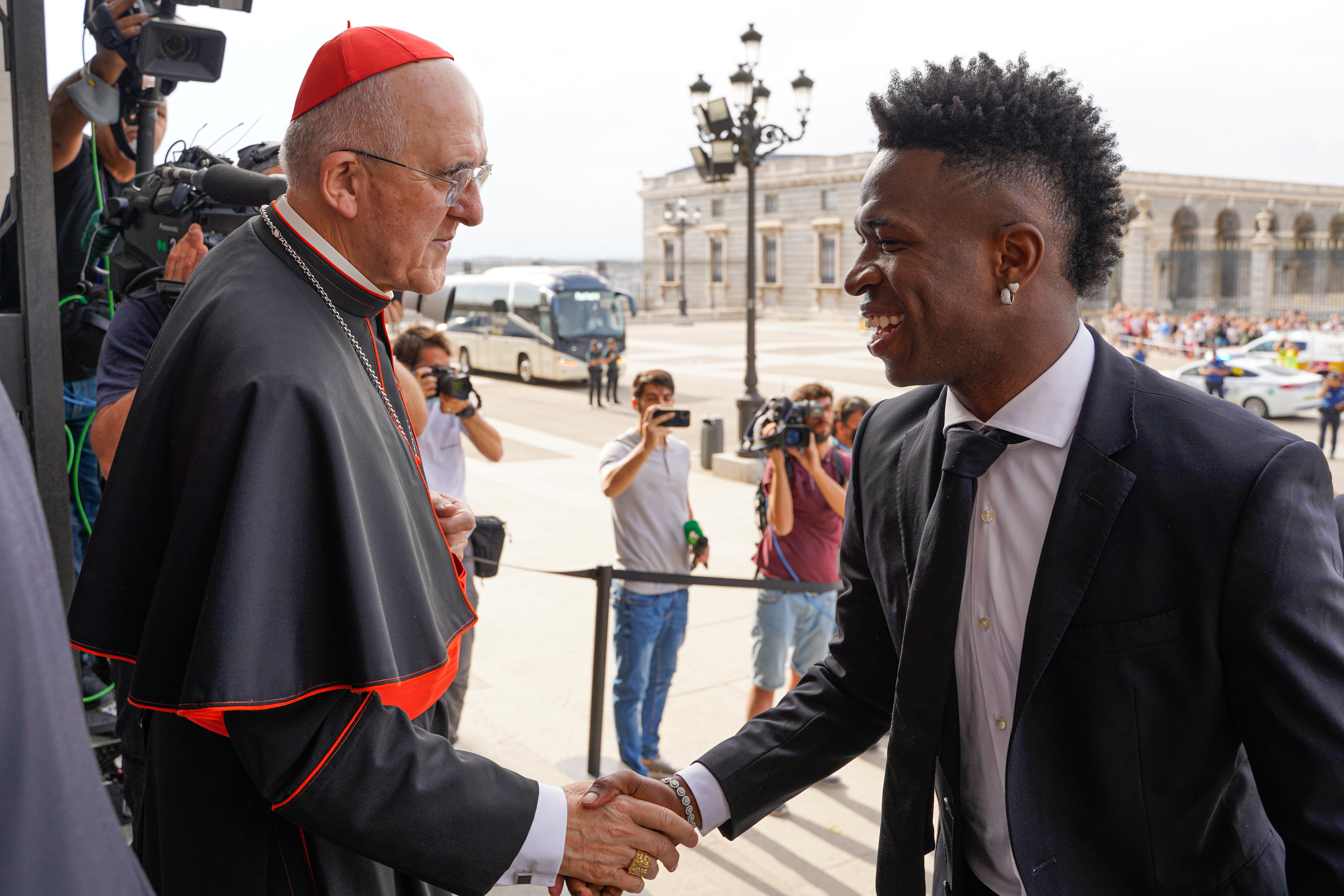
Vinícius Jr. in a trophy presentation ceremony at Virgin of Almudena in 2022

Vinícius started the 2021–22 season by scoring Real Madrid's fourth goal in a 4–1 away victory over Alavés on the opening day of the La Liga campaign. On 22 August, he scored a brace in a 3–3 draw against Levante coming off the bench, which earned him a first-team place, ahead of Eden Hazard. On 30 October, he scored twice as Real Madrid won 2–1 at Elche to go top of the La Liga table. The goals were his sixth and seventh of the league season and his eighth and ninth overall, surpassing his total output of six goals in all competitions during the 2020–21 season in just 14 matches. On 12 May 2022, he scored his first hat-trick for Real Madrid in a 6–0 victory over Levante.

On 28 May, he scored the only goal in a 1–0 win over Liverpool in the Champions League final to clinch Madrid their record 14th UEFA Champions League title. Vinícius ended the 2021–22 season as Real Madrid's second-best goalscorer with 22 goals in all competitions, only behind his attacking partner Karim Benzema. For his performances Vinícius was named the inaugural Champions League young player of the season and included in the 2021–22 UEFA Champions League team of the season.

==== 2022–23: No. 7 shirt and Club World Cup title ====
On 11 February, Real Madrid defeated Al-Hilal 5–3 in the 2022 FIFA Club World Cup final as Vinícius scored a brace to claim the tournament's best player award and his second Club World Cup title. On 21 February 2023, Vinícius scored two first-half goals to power Real Madrid's 5–2 comeback win at Anfield against Liverpool in the first leg of their Champions League knockout stage round of 16 tie.

On 9 May 2023, Vinícius made a significant contribution to Real Madrid's performance in the first leg of the semi-final against Manchester City, scoring a remarkable long-range goal in the 36th minute. Alongside teammates Rodrygo and Karim Benzema, he created numerous opportunities, showcasing Real Madrid's counter-attacking prowess against Manchester City's dominant possession. The match ultimately ended in a 1–1 draw. However, in the second leg of the semi-final, Real Madrid suffered a crushing 4–0 defeat against City, thereby ending their campaign for the Champions League title. He was selected in the 2022–23 UEFA Champions League team of the tournament.

In the aftermath of Hazard's departure, Real Madrid confirmed that Vinícius, who previously wore the No. 20 shirt, would be sporting the club's iconic No. 7 jersey, once worn by Cristiano Ronaldo and Raúl, from 2023–24 season onwards.

==== 2023–24: Third La Liga title, second Champions League trophy, and becoming club talisman ====
On 19 August 2023, Vinícius scored the decisive goal in a La Liga match against Almería, contributing to Real Madrid's victory alongside teammate Jude Bellingham, who netted the previous two goals. On 25 August 2023, Vinícius sustained an injury to his right biceps femoris muscle during a league match against Celta, a game that Real Madrid ultimately won 1–0. On 27 September 2023, Vinícius made his return to play in a league fixture against Las Palmas after recovering from his injury. On 3 October, he got his first Champions League goal of the season, netting the 1–1 equaliser in Madrid's away game against Napoli, which eventually ended in a 3–2 win.

Real Madrid announced on 31 October 2023 that they had extended Vinícius' contract until 30 June 2027. On 14 January 2024, he scored a hat-trick in a 4–1 victory over Barcelona in the Supercopa de España final. Throughout the month of March, Vinícius went on a rich goalscoring run, scoring six goals in four matches across all competitions, including a brace against Valencia at the Mestalla, and the tie winning goal against RB Leipzig in the Champions League last 16 to help Real Madrid advance to the quarter-finals. On 21 April, he scored another goal against Barcelona in Real Madrid's 3–2 home win to help Los Blancos virtually seal the league title. On 30 April, he netted a brace in a 2–2 away draw against Bayern Munich in the Champions League semi-final first leg; hence, he managed to score at that round for the third consecutive season, in addition to reaching at least 20 goals in all competitions for the third straight season. He then followed up this performance with another man of the match performance against Bayern in the second leg, helping Real Madrid win 2–1 and advance to the final.

On 1 June, Vinícius scored in Real Madrid's 2–0 win over Borussia Dortmund in the 2024 UEFA Champions League Final, winning his second trophy in the competition. Aged 23 years and 325 days, he became the youngest player to score in two Champions League finals, beating Lionel Messi's record by thirteen days. Two days later, Vinícius was named the UEFA Champions League Player of the Season, registering six goals and five assists in Madrid's trophy-winning campaign.

==== 2024–25: Best FIFA Men's Player and 100th club goal ====
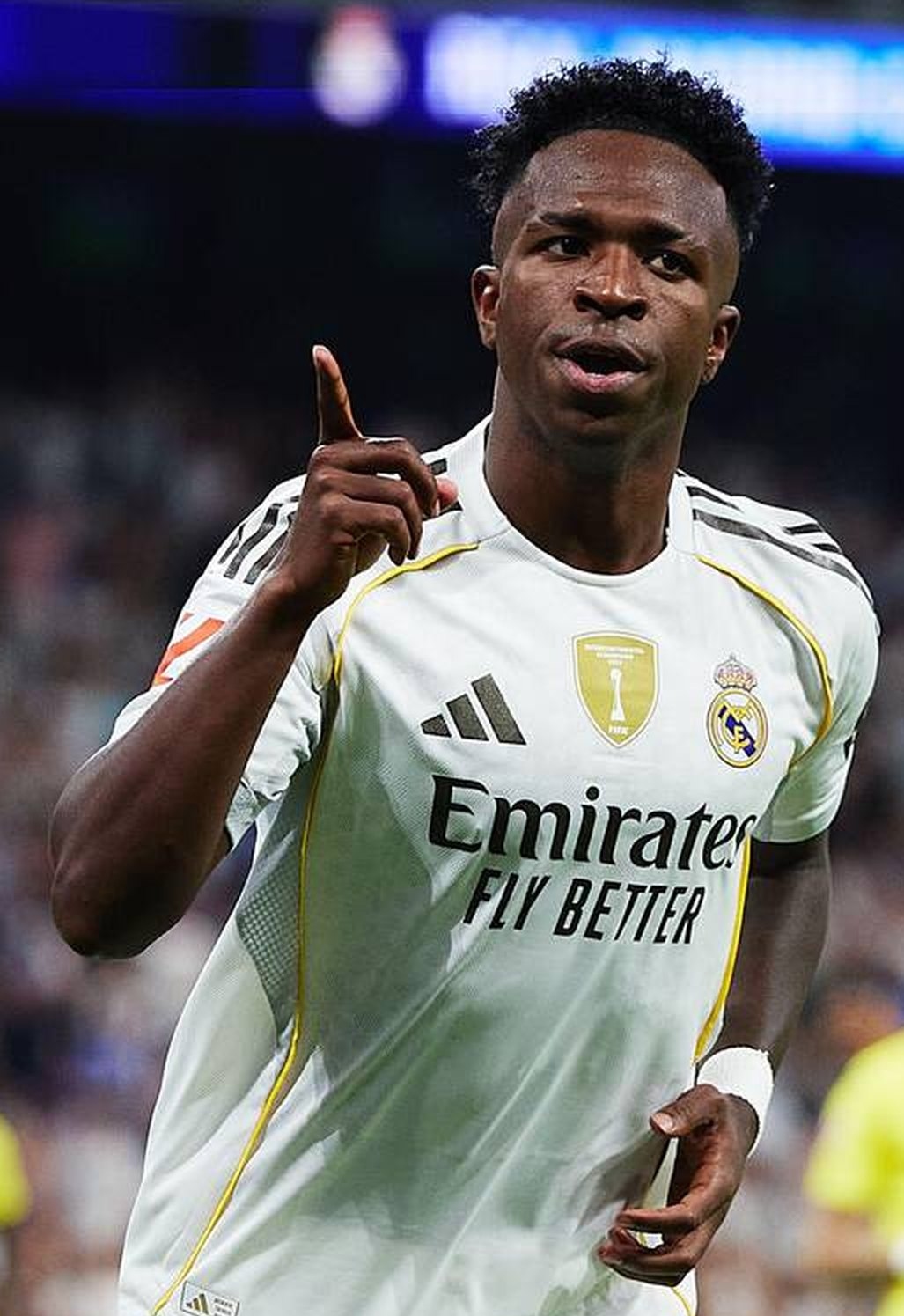
Vinícius Jr. playing for Real Madrid in 2025

On 22 October 2024, Vinícius scored his first continental hat-trick in a 5–2 comeback win against Borussia Dortmund. He finished second in the 2024 Ballon d'Or behind Rodri. On 17 December, Vinícius was named The Best FIFA Men's Player for 2024. The following day, he assisted Kylian Mbappé's opener and converted a penalty in a 3–0 final win over Pachuca, as Madrid were crowned the inaugural FIFA Intercontinental Cup champions. With this performance, Vinícius received the Player of the Tournament and Golden Ball awards. On 22 January 2025, Vinícius scored his 100th and 101st goals for Real Madrid in a 5–1 Champions League win over Red Bull Salzburg, becoming the 23rd player to achieve this feat for the club. On 26 February, he took to the pitch at the Reale Arena wearing Real Madrid's captain armband for the first time in his career, as the first leg of the Copa del Rey semi-finals against Real Sociedad ended 1–0 in the favor of Los Blancos.

==== 2025–present: Contract extension ====
On 17 February 2026, Vinícius scored the only goal in a 1–0 away win over Benfica in the Champions League knockout phase play-offs, reaching his 31st goal in the competition to become the second-highest Brazilian scorer, overtaking Kaká and trailing only Neymar. A month later, on 11 March, he provided an assist in a 3–0 win over Manchester City, reaching his 31st assist in the Champions League and equaling his club's record in the competition set by Cristiano Ronaldo. On 3 May, he scored a brace in a 2–0 away win over Espanyol, reaching 21 goals in the 2025–26 season and becoming the eighth player in the club's history to score more than 20 goals in five consecutive campaigns.

On 6 August 2026, Vinícius extended his contract with the club until 30 June 2032. On 10 October 2026, Vinícius was suspended for four games after being handed a red card for hair-pulling Nathan Saliba during a 1-0 win against Villarreal.

== International career ==
=== 2015–2019: Success at youth level ===
On 30 October 2015, Vinícius was called up for Brazil by coach Guilherme Dalla Déa for the South American U-15 Championship. Vinícius and Brazil won the U-15 title, and he was the 2nd top-scorer of the tournament with seven goals. He was named player of the tournament and continued to perform, which helped him convince Flamengo to sign him by the age of 16. On 24 June 2016, Vinícius was called up for a friendly against Chile U-17 and scored two goals and provided two assists in the 4–2 victory.

In March 2017, Vinícius debuted in the South American U-17 Championship for Brazil with a goal in a 3–0 victory over Peru. In the final stage, he scored two goals in a 3–0 win over Ecuador and two goals in a 3–0 victory over Colombia, securing Brazil's place in the 2017 FIFA U-17 World Cup in India, where Brazil (without Vinícius) eventually would finish third. After leading Brazil to win the South American U-17 Championship, he was named the tournament's best player and was top goal-scorer with seven goals.

=== 2019–2026: Senior and World Cup debuts ===
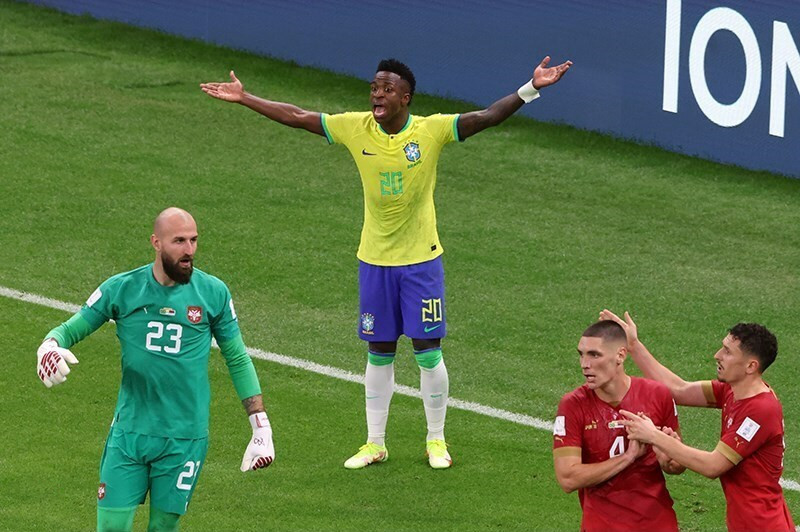
Vinícius with Brazil in 2022 FIFA World Cup group stage match against Serbia

On 28 February 2019, Vinícius was called up to the Brazil national team for the first time for friendlies against Panama and the Czech Republic. However, he suffered an injury while playing for Real Madrid, and David Neres was called up in his place in March. In May, he was excluded from Brazil's final 23-man squad for the 2019 Copa América by manager Tite. The same year on 10 September, he debuted as a 72nd-minute substitute in Brazil's 1–0 defeat against Peru.

Vinícius was named in Brazil's 2021 Copa América squad by Tite on 9 June 2021, which was held on home soil. He made a substitute appearance in his country's 1–0 defeat against rivals Argentina in the final on 10 July.

On 24 March 2022, Vinícius scored his debut goal for the national team, in a 4–0 home victory against Chile in a 2022 FIFA World Cup qualification match at the Maracanã Stadium. On 7 November 2022, Vinícius was named in the Brazil squad for the 2022 FIFA World Cup by Tite. In the opening group match against Serbia on 24 November, he set-up Richarlison's second goal to help Brazil to a 2–0 victory. He scored his first FIFA World Cup goal in a 4–1 victory against South Korea in the round of 16 on 5 December, also setting up Lucas Paquetá's goal, helping Brazil qualify for the quarter-finals, where they were eliminated by Croatia four days later following a 4–2 penalty shoot-out loss after a 1–1 draw.

On 26 March 2024, Vinícius served as captain of the national team for the first time in a friendly match against Spain at the Santiago Bernabéu, his club's home ground. At the 2024 Copa América, Vinícius scored his first two goals in the tournament in Brazil's second group match, a 4–1 win against Paraguay, also picking up a yellow card; he picked up another booking in his nation's final group match, a 1–1 draw against Colombia, which ruled him out of the quarter-finals. In his absence, Brazil were eliminated following a 4–2 penalty shoot-out defeat after a goalless draw against Uruguay.

In May 2026, Vinícius was selected for Brazil's squad for the 2026 FIFA World Cup. He secured his 50th cap and celebrated this achievement with his 10th international goal, in Brazil's opening game of the 2026 FIFA World Cup against Morocco. After the game, he was named player of the match. In Brazil's second group match on 19 June, he assisted Matheus Cunha's second goal and later scored his team's third in a 3–0 victory over Haiti. On 24 June, he netted a brace and was named Man of the Match in a 3–0 victory over Scotland, becoming the fifth Brazilian player to score in all three group-stage matches of a FIFA World Cup, after Jairzinho, Romário, Ronaldo, and Rivaldo.

== Player profile ==
=== Style of play ===
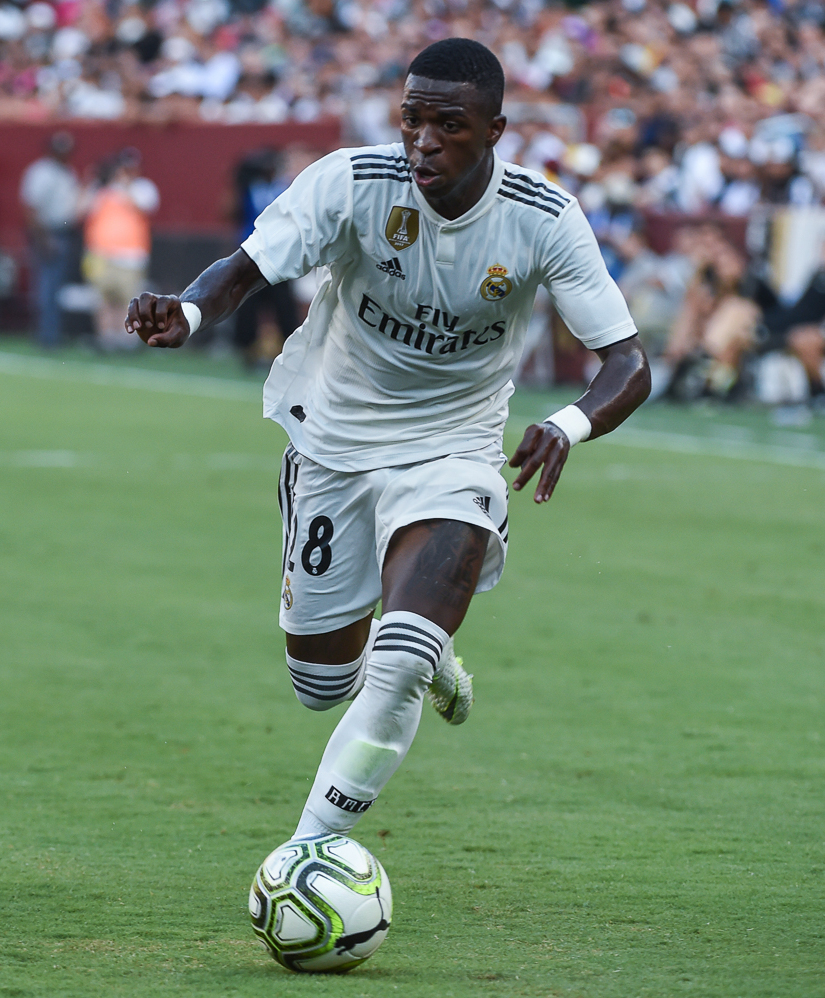
Vinícius playing for Real Madrid in 2018

Shortly after his arrival at Real Madrid in July 2018, ESPN journalist Dermot Corrigan described Vinícius as a "zippy left winger or second striker". A versatile player, although he is usually deployed on the left flank, he is capable of playing anywhere along the front line, and has also been used on the right or in the centre. Possessing explosive acceleration, and excellent pace, agility, balance, technique, flair, dribbling skills, and close control at speed, as well as significant power, physical strength, and trickery on the ball, despite his slender build, he is known for his movement, energy, ability to run at defences, change direction quickly, and beat opponents in one on one situations while in possession of the ball.

Regarded as a promising young player, he is considered to be a dynamic, intelligent, hard-working, and nimble winger, with a low centre of gravity, as well as impressive passing and awareness. Moreover, he is known for his eye for the final ball and ability to provide assists to teammates, which makes him an effective playmaker. Although he is also capable of scoring goals himself, his shooting and goalscoring were initially cited by pundits as areas in need of improvement, as his lack of end product was often a source of criticism in the media in his first few seasons at Real Madrid. In June 2017, Vinícius appeared at 39th place on The Telegraph's list of the best under-21 players in the world. He was the only player playing in South America at the time to appear on the list. In November 2018, former Argentina international frontman José Luis Calderón credited Vinícius' "general enthusiasm, his ability to make things happen, the joy and good vibrations he transmits, his speed, the fact he's different and the fact he's daring. To sum up, he has a spark that could be used by a team that has been plain in recent matches". In his youth with Flamengo, he was criticised, however, by several football figures, fans, and the press for "doing too many tricks", and for "[t]oo much individualism, not enough teamwork".

During the 2021–22 season, Vinícius had a breakthrough season with Real Madrid, and his goal scoring and assist output increased dramatically, enabling him to form an effective offensive partnership from the left wing with striker Karim Benzema. Regarding his change in form, Vinícius commented in December 2021: "I think I've improved in many things, but above all in my calmness in my play, I'm doing things with more tranquillity and more quality too." The club's manager Carlo Ancelotti also praised him for his defensive work-rate and positioning, in addition to his creative abilities and talent, noting that he was able to improve upon his tactical knowledge and physical condition throughout the course of the season, as well as his finishing. His performances led the Spanish press to compare him to compatriot Neymar. Following his goal in Real Madrid's victory in the 2022 Champions League final, Neymar himself described Vinícius as "the best player in the world." Later that month, Ed McCambridge of FourFourTwo ranked Vinícius as the second–best left winger in the world. Vinícius was also used in a free role as a left-sided forward or striker in a 4–3–1–2 formation during the 2023–24 season by manager Carlo Ancelotti; in this position, although he operated in more central areas, he was still given the freedom to move out wide or switch positions and link-up with Rodrygo on the other side of the pitch.

=== Criticisms ===
During his spell at Real Madrid, Vinícius has been criticised for his perceived lack of discipline and sportsmanship on the field. His behavior has resulted in him often receiving bookings for verbal dissent to referees and physical confrontations with opposing players. Following an incident in March 2024, in which he pushed RB Leipzig player Willi Orbán in the neck, Vinícius was criticised by former Real Madrid player Predrag Mijatović, who said that if Vinícius does not "calm down", he "will never become a legendary player, regardless of the good he does in terms of football". Vinícius has also been criticised for his provocative behaviour and celebrations, with former Brazil coach Vanderlei Luxemburgo claiming that Vinícius provokes a lot of the treatment he receives on the field. Real Madrid head coach Carlo Ancelotti admitted in March 2024 that Vinícius should "control himself a little better", with reports from SPORT claiming that Real Madrid believed that Vinícius was hurting the club's image.

=== On-field racism incidents and reactions ===
La Liga has reported 26 incidents of racist abuse directed at Vinícius since October 2021. These have included racist chants by fans and the hanging of a mannequin made to look like Vinícius from a bridge near his team's training grounds.

On 17 February 2026, during a Champions League match against Benfica, Vinícius scored the winning goal but was booked for excessive celebration toward the home crowd, before becoming involved in a heated confrontation that led to play being halted for around 10 minutes after he reported an alleged racist remark from Gianluca Prestianni, prompting UEFA's anti-racism protocol to be activated. Several Real Madrid teammates publicly supported him after the match, while Vinícius later reiterated his stance against racism and thanked supporters for their backing. UEFA announced the following day that it had opened an investigation to examine allegations of discriminatory behaviour. A racist remark carries a mandatory ten-game ban. Prestianni claimed he used a homophobic slur, rather than a racist one, toward Vinícius. In April 2026, UEFA banned Prestianni for six matches, with Prestianni to serve three. Prestianni covered his mouth with his shirt during the incident. FIFA president Gianni Infantino said players who do so should be sent off.

=== Anti-racism activism ===
In some incidents in 2023, Vinícius was subjected to racist slurs and chants from football fans in Spain, including an effigy of him being hanged from a bridge in Madrid. On 23 May 2023, four men were arrested by the Spanish Police in connection with the effigy. In response, Vinícius condemned La Liga for what he perceived as normalisation of racism, and advocated for more stringent measures and penalties to combat racist behaviour. On 22 May 2023, Real Madrid released an official statement strongly condemning the racist abuse against Vinícius, viewing it as a direct attack on the democratic coexistence model of Spain; the club reported the incident as a "hate crime" to the Attorney General's Office, reserving its right to act as a private prosecutor in any ensuing proceedings. On 15 June 2023, Vinícius was selected by FIFA president Gianni Infantino to lead a special FIFA anti-racism committee composed of players.

==== Response ====
Some commentators believe the global outrage and outpouring of support for Vinícius following his stand against racism could mark a turning point in the fight against racism in football and Spain in general. Guy Hedgecoe of BBC News said that the issue has transcended the borders of Spain and of sport, as public figures from around the world are acknowledging that for which he stands. Brazilian president Luiz Inácio Lula da Silva condemned racism and expressed his solidarity towards Vinícius while urging FIFA and other responsible football bodies to take the strongest actions possible. Brazil's iconic Christ the Redeemer statue switched off its lights in a show of support for Vinícius following racial slurs from Valencia fans at the Mestalla Stadium in Spain. Sean Gregory, writing for Time said: "The effects of racist abuse in the world's most popular game are felt far beyond the stadium walls, that the ugliness persists in 2023 also on full, terrible display, at stadiums around the world is a forever stain on the so-called beautiful game." In Rio de Janeiro, representatives of more than 150 activist groups and non-profits delivered a letter to Spain's consulate, demanding an investigation into the league and its president. Flávio Dino, Brazil's minister of justice, threatened Spain with applying the principle of extraterritoriality over Vinícius' case.

Various sporting figures from around the world, including seven-time Formula One world champion Lewis Hamilton, coaches Xavi and Carlo Ancelotti, pundit Rio Ferdinand, the Real Madrid Femenino and Real Madrid Baloncesto teams, as well as footballers Didier Drogba, Kylian Mbappé, Iñaki Williams, Raphinha, Ronaldo, Neymar, and Rafael Leão, offered him praise and support. Anti-racism legislation called "Vini Jr. laws" were approved in the Brazilian states Rio de Janeiro and Rio Grande do Sul, which will see sporting events stopped or suspended in the event of racist conduct. He also received awards from Rio's legislative assembly and city council and his footprints were added to the stadium's walk of fame, beside those of Brazilian greats such as Pelé, Garrincha and Ronaldo. Vinícius received the Sócrates Award at the 2023 Ballon d'Or ceremony for his humanitarian projects and fight against racism.

== Outside football ==
Vinicius is an owner of Alverca, who play in Primeira Liga in Portugal.

=== Advocacy ===
In 2021, Vinícius founded the Instituto Vini Jr., an organisation to facilitate access to school for Brazilian children and teenagers from disadvantaged neighbourhoods, aiming to help alleviate educational inequality in Brazil. In 2023, he was awarded the Sócrates Award. In 2024, UNESCO appointed Vinícius Goodwill Ambassador for Education for All. He is the second footballer after Pelé to become a UNESCO ambassador.

=== Media ===
In May 2025, Netflix released a documentary film titled Vini Jr, directed by Emílio Domingos and Andrucha Waddington. The film chronicles his life and career, including his response to racism on and off the pitch.

== Personal life ==
Vinícius is a Roman Catholic.

In November 2024, Vinícius received his genetic results from African Ancestry, and learned that his maternal lineage was traced to the Tikar people of Cameroon. The Brazilian Football Confederation presented him with the certificate in front of a stadium full of supporters.

In October 2025, Vinícius publicly confirmed his relationship with influencer and content creator Virginia Fonseca through an Instagram post. They had an on-off relationship. On 11 October 2026, Fonseca confirmed to CNN Brasil that her relationship with Vinícius had ended.

Vinícius underwent a non-surgical cosmetic chin procedure at a clinic in Goiânia in 2026.

== Career statistics ==
=== Club ===
As of match played 21 November 2026

Appearances and goals by club, season, and competition
Club	Season	League			National cup (Note: Includes Copa do Brasil, Copa del Rey)		Continental		Other		Total	
Club	Season	Division	Apps	Goals	Apps	Goals	Apps	Goals	Apps	Goals	Apps	Goals
Flamengo	2017	Série A	25	3	4	0	7 (Note: Appearances in Copa Sudamericana)	1	1 (Note: Appearance in Primeira Liga)	0	37	4
Flamengo	2018	Série A	12	4	2	0	5 (Note: Appearances in Copa Libertadores)	2	13 (Note: Appearances in Campeonato Carioca)	4	32	10
Flamengo	Total		37	7	6	0	12	3	14	4	69	14
Real Madrid Castilla	2018–19	Segunda División B	5	4	—		—		—		5	4
Real Madrid	2018–19	La Liga	18	2	8	2	4 (Note: Appearances in UEFA Champions League)	0	1 (Note: Appearance in FIFA Club World Cup)	0	31	4
Real Madrid	2019–20	La Liga	29	3	3	1	5	1	1 (Note: Appearance(s) in Supercopa de España)	0	38	5
Real Madrid	2020–21	La Liga	35	3	1	0	12	3	1	0	49	6
Real Madrid	2021–22	La Liga	35	17	2	0	13	4	2	1	52	22
Real Madrid	2022–23	La Liga	33	10	5	3	12	7	5 (Note: Two appearances in Supercopa de España, one appearance in UEFA Super Cup, two appearances and three goals in FIFA Club World Cup)	3	55	23
Real Madrid	2023–24	La Liga	26	15	1	0	10	6	2	3	39	24
Real Madrid	2024–25	La Liga	30	11	6	1	12	8	10 (Note: Two appearances in Supercopa de España, one appearance in UEFA Super Cup, one appearance and one goal in FIFA Intercontinental Cup, six appearances and one goal in FIFA Club World Cup)	2	58	22
Real Madrid	2025–26	La Liga	36	16	1	0	14	5	2	1	53	22
Real Madrid	2026–27	La Liga	9	1	0	0	4	0	0	0	13	1
Real Madrid	Total		251	78	27	7	86	34	24	10	389	129
Career total			293	89	33	7	98	37	38	14	463	147

=== International ===
As of match played 17 November 2026

Appearances and goals by national team and year
National team	Year	Apps	Goals
Brazil	2019	1	0
Brazil	2020	0	0
Brazil	2021	8	0
Brazil	2022	11	2
Brazil	2023	6	1
Brazil	2024	11	2
Brazil	2025	8	3
Brazil	2026	14	11
Total		59	19

As of match played 17 November 2026
Scores and results list Brazil's goal tally first, score column indicates score after each Vinícius goal.

List of international goals scored by Vinícius Júnior
No.	Date	Venue	Cap	Opponent	Score	Result	Competition
1	24 March 2022	Maracanã Stadium, Rio de Janeiro, Brazil	12	Chile	2–0	4–0	2022 FIFA World Cup qualification
2	5 December 2022	Stadium 974, Doha, Qatar	19	South Korea	1–0	4–1	2022 FIFA World Cup
3	17 June 2023	RCDE Stadium, Barcelona, Spain	22	Guinea	4–1	4–1	Friendly
4	28 June 2024	Allegiant Stadium, Las Vegas, United States	32	Paraguay	1–0	4–1	2024 Copa América
5	28 June 2024	Allegiant Stadium, Las Vegas, United States	32	Paraguay	3–0	4–1	2024 Copa América
6	20 March 2025	Estádio Nacional Mané Garrincha, Brasília, Brazil	38	Colombia	2–1	2–1	2026 FIFA World Cup qualification
7	10 June 2025	Neo Química Arena, São Paulo, Brazil	41	Paraguay	1–0	1–0	2026 FIFA World Cup qualification
8	10 October 2025	Seoul World Cup Stadium, Seoul, South Korea	42	South Korea	5–0	5–0	Friendly
9	31 May 2026	Maracanã Stadium, Rio de Janeiro, Brazil	48	Panama	1–0	6–2	Friendly
10	13 June 2026	MetLife Stadium, East Rutherford, United States	50	Morocco	1–1	1–1	2026 FIFA World Cup
11	19 June 2026	Lincoln Financial Field, Philadelphia, United States	51	Haiti	3–0	3–0	2026 FIFA World Cup
12	24 June 2026	Hard Rock Stadium, Miami Gardens, United States	52	Scotland	1–0	3–0	2026 FIFA World Cup
13	24 June 2026	Hard Rock Stadium, Miami Gardens, United States	52	Scotland	2–0	3–0	2026 FIFA World Cup
14	29 September 2026	Lang Park, Brisbane, Australia	56	Australia	4–2	4–2	Friendly
15	14 November 2026	National Stadium, Kallang, Singapore	58	Japan	1–2	2–3	Friendly
16	14 November 2026	National Stadium, Kallang, Singapore	58	Japan	2–2	2–3	Friendly
17	17 November 2026	National Stadium, Kallang, Singapore	59	Singapore	1–0	7–0	Friendly
18	17 November 2026	National Stadium, Kallang, Singapore	59	Singapore	2–0	7–0	Friendly
19	17 November 2026	National Stadium, Kallang, Singapore	59	Singapore	3–0	7–0	Friendly

== Honours ==
Real Madrid

- La Liga: 2019–20, 2021–22, 2023–24
- Copa del Rey: 2022–23; runner-up: 2024–25
- Supercopa de España: 2020, 2022, 2024
- UEFA Champions League: 2021–22, 2023–24
- UEFA Super Cup: 2022, 2024
- FIFA Club World Cup: 2018, 2022
- FIFA Intercontinental Cup: 2024

Brazil U15

- South American U-15 Championship: 2015

Brazil U17

- South American U-17 Championship: 2017
- BRICS U-17 Football Cup: 2016

Brazil

- Copa América runner-up: 2021

Individual

- Copa São Paulo de Futebol Júnior Best Left Winger: 2017
- South American U-17 Championship Best Player: 2017
- La Liga Player of the Month: November 2021, March 2024, November 2024
- La Liga Team of the Season: 2021–22, 2022–23, 2023–24, 2024–25
- UEFA Champions League Team of the Season: 2021–22, 2022–23, 2023–24
- UEFA Champions League Young Player of the Season: 2021–22
- IFFHS Men's CONMEBOL Team: 2022, 2023, 2024
- UEFA Champions League Player of the Season: 2023–24
- ESM Team of the Year: 2023–24
- FIFA Club World Cup Golden Ball: 2022
- FIFA Intercontinental Cup Golden Ball: 2024
- FIFPRO Men's World 11: 2023, 2024
- Sócrates Award: 2023
- Samba Gold: 2023, 2024
- Ballon d'Or runner-up: 2024
- The Best FIFA Men's Player: 2024
- FIFA Men's World 11: 2024
- IFFHS Men's World Team: 2024
- Globe Soccer Best Player of the Year: 2024
- Globe Soccer Best Forward: 2024

== See also ==
- List of FIFA World Cup top goalscorers
