= 8th BRICS summit =

2016 international summit in Goa, India

- 15–16 October 2016
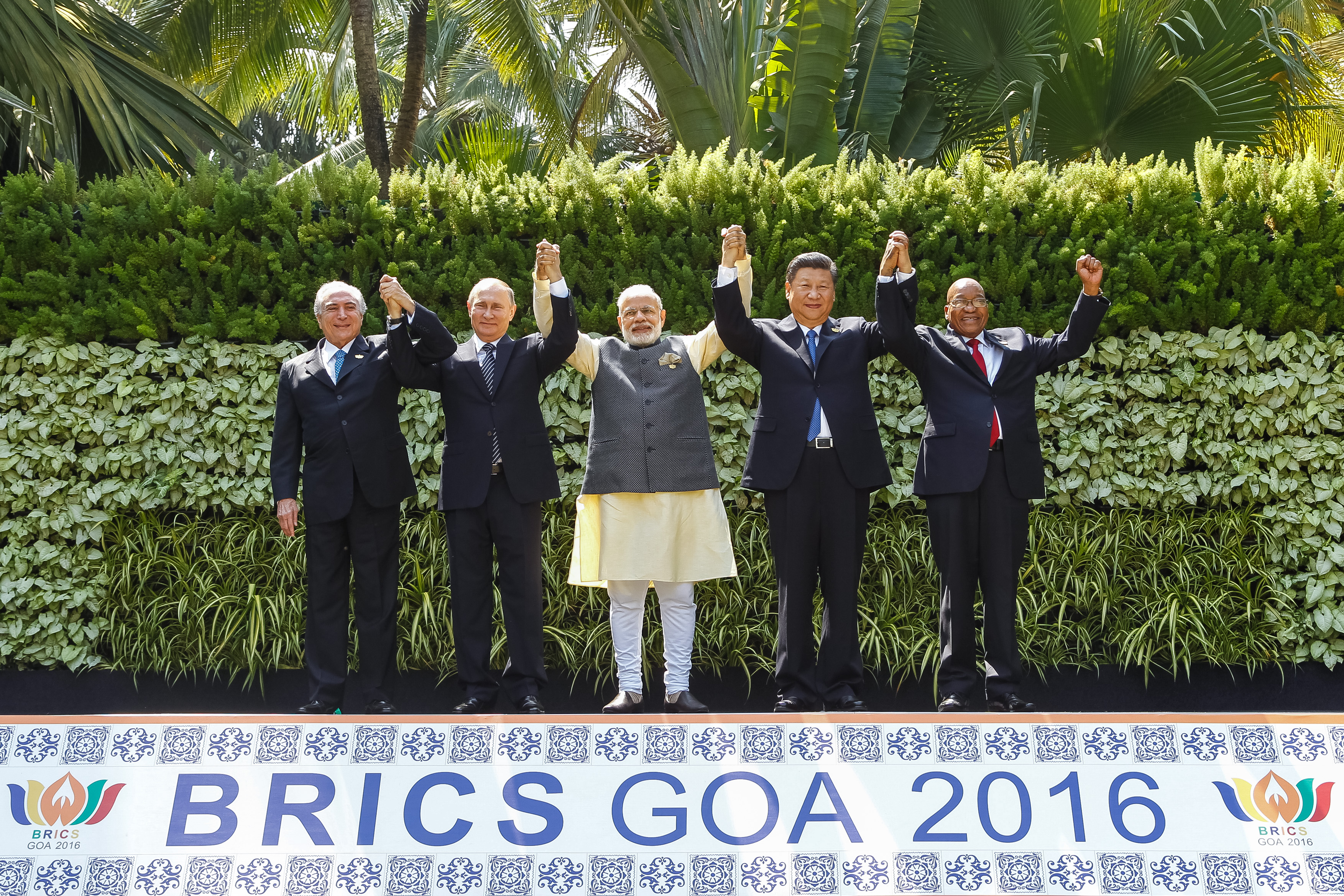
- Host country: India
- Cities: Benaulim, Goa
- Venues: Taj Exotica
- Participants: Brazil; Russia; India; China; South Africa; Guest invitees: BIMSTEC members
- Chair: Narendra Modi, prime minister of India

The 2016 BRICS summit was the eighth annual BRICS summit, an international relations conference attended by the heads of country or heads of government of the five member countries Brazil, Russia, India, China and South Africa. The summit was held from 15 to 16 October 2016 at the Taj Exotica hotel in Benaulim, Goa, India. India holds the chair of the BRICS from February 2016 to December 2016.

== Background ==
In July 2015, during the 7th BRICS summit, it was announced that India will host the 8th BRICS summit in 2016. In March 2016, Goa was announced as the venue of the summit.

== Participants ==
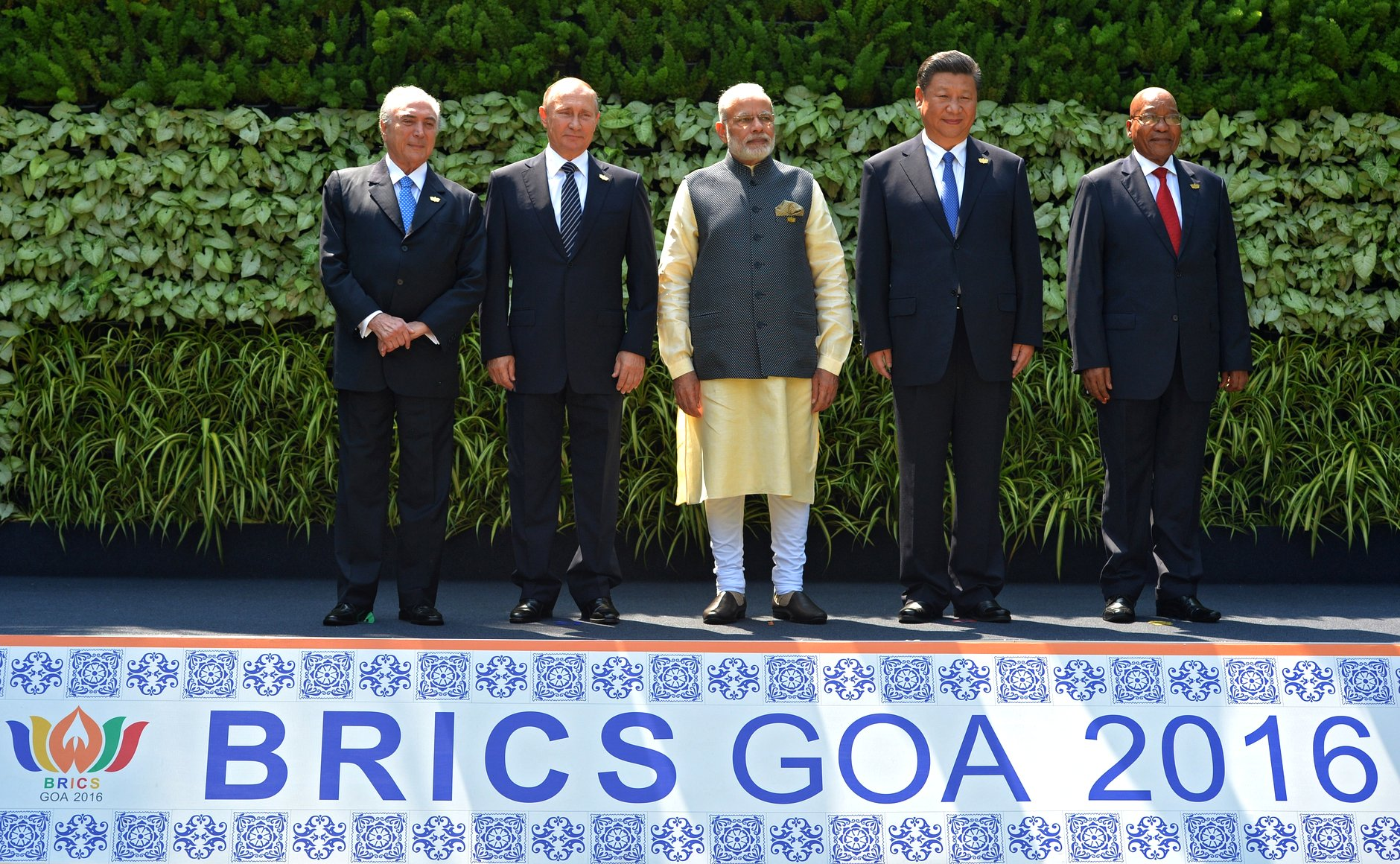
Group photo of BRICS leaders before the start of the summit.

**BRICS members** Host state and leader are shown in bold text.
Member		Represented by	Title
(Brazil)	Brazil	Michel Temer	President
(Russia)	Russia	Vladimir Putin	President
(India)	**India**	**Narendra Modi**	**Prime Minister**
(China)	China	Xi Jinping	CCP General Secretary; President
(South Africa)	South Africa	Jacob Zuma	President

== Sideline events ==
The first BRICS film festival was held at New Delhi from 2 to 6 September 2016. The five-day film festival screened four films each from the participating States.

The environment ministers of BRICS states held a meeting on 16 September in Goa and they agreed on a memorandum of understanding and announced the setting up of a joint working group institutionalising their mutual cooperation on environment related issues. The agriculture ministers of BRICS nations held a meeting on 23 September in New Delhi.

The first trade fair of the BRICS countries, was held at Pragati Maidan exhibition ground, New Delhi from 12 to 14 October. Controversially, China skipped the event over trade barriers, but was read in the media in India as a snub amidst a diplomatic row following the latter's veto over India's request to name JeM leader Masood Azhar to the UN as a "designated terrorist."

The first BRICS U-17 Football Cup was held at Goa from 5 to 15 October.

== Summit ==
A statement was issued that read the member states "strongly condemn terrorism in all its forms and manifestations and stressed that there can be no justification whatsoever." The group had also decided to set up a credit rating agency at some point in the future. They also called on the BRICS' New Development Bank to focus on funding specific development priorities and to create a network of angel investors. Other agreements included to set up research centres in the fields of agriculture, railways and a BRICS sports council.

The final communique focused on promoting "international norms that promote stability and inclusion in common spaces." It suggested that with "mega-regional trading agreements have significantly altered the discourse on cross-border trade, the summit stressed the need for co-operation in crucial matters relating to intellectual property rights and the digital economy." They also highlighted the "centrality" to the WTO trading system, but their endorsement this year is significant. It further reflected a moment in the group's history, which has seen "alternative" powers weighing on the side of liberal, multilateral trading institutions that were conceived by the West. Digital spaces were referred to beyond Internet governance alone, but also to keep cyberspace open for commerce and prevent its "stratification" by exclusive trading regimes.

Amongst other independent statements, Xi Jinping issued a statement that read: "The global economy is still going through a treacherous recovery. Because of the impact of both internal and external factors, BRICS countries have somewhat slowed down in economic growth and have faced a number of new challenges in development." He further warned against a backlash to globalisation: "At present the deep-seated impact of the international financial crisis is still unfolding...deep-seated imbalances that triggered the financial crisis. Some countries are getting more inward-looking in their policies. Protectionism is rising and forces against globalisation are posing an emerging risk." Modi also stated that BRICS were a beacon of peace and promise.

== BRICS-BIMSTEC Summit ==
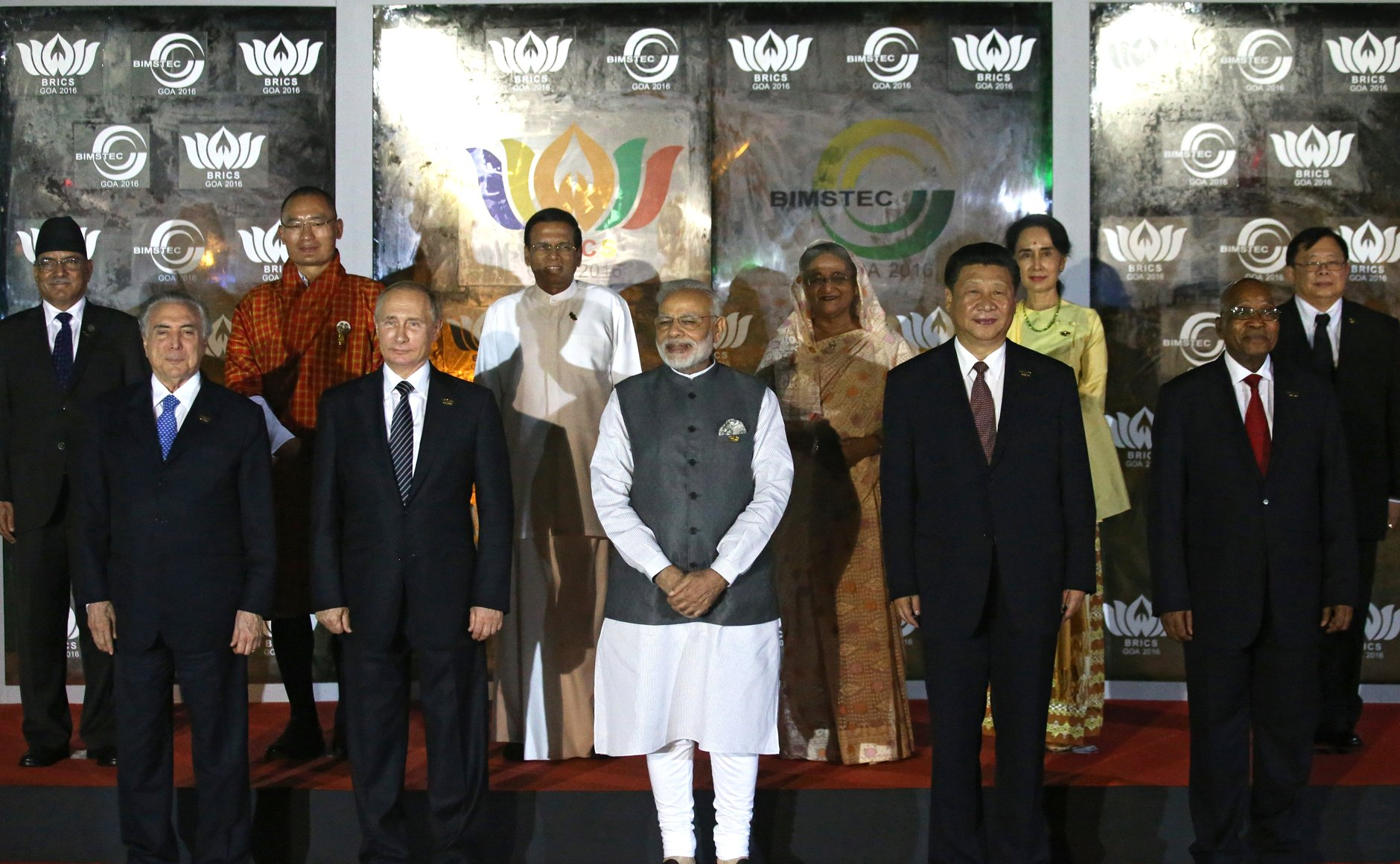
Group photo of BRICS leaders with heads of delegations of BIMSTEC member states before their meeting.

Leaders of BIMSTEC member countries were invited by India, to hold a joint summit with the BRICS for the latter's regional outreach.

Representatives of the BIMSTEC states in attendance

- Bangladesh - Sheikh Hasina, Prime minister
- Bhutan – Tshering Tobgay, Prime minister
- Myanmar – Aung San Suu Kyi, State Counsellor
- Nepal – Pushpa Kamal Dahal, Prime minister
- Sri Lanka – Maithripala Sirisena, President
- Thailand – Virasakdi Futrakul, Vice-Minister

== Bilateral meetings ==
Modi was due to meet Putin and Xi Jinping the day before the summit started.

On the way to the summit, Xi Jinping stopped in Bangladesh and oversaw deals worth US$13.6 billion being signed, as well as US$20 billion in loan agreements.

Following the summit, India and Myanmar's representatives met in New Delhi and signed three MOUs: on cooperation in the power sector; on banking supervision between the Reserve Bank of India and the Central Bank of Myanmar; and on designing an academic and professional building programme for the insurance industry of Myanmar.

== Controversy ==
On the issue of militancy there was controversy, particularly in light of the aftermath of the 2016 Uri attack and the 2016 Kashmir unrest. While Modi said that BRICS members "agreed that those who nurture, shelter, support and sponsor such forces of violence and terror are as much a threat to us as the terrorists themselves." The final communique did not mention such a consensus or the words "nurture," "shelter" or "sponsor." China also did not budge on its stance over both rejecting India's bid for membership in the Nuclear Suppliers Group and over the UNSC veto. Pakistan said that Indian leaders were misleading BRICS members. China's Foreign Ministry spokeswoman Hua Chunying said that China would support its "all-weather ally" amid a campaign by India to isolate Pakistan.

Social media in India also called for a boycott of China amid the controversies over the UNSC veto, but Modi sought to further trade. The Tibetan Youth Congress also protested outside China's embassy in New Delhi. Its President Tenzin Jigme issued a statement that read: "As long as the occupation continues, as long as the communist government continues with their hardline stance and policies, ignoring the cries of the Tibetan people, the struggle and resistance of Tibetans will continue. [China must stop its] illegal occupation [of Tibet]." He also expressed concern over the "current critical situation."

== Leaders ==
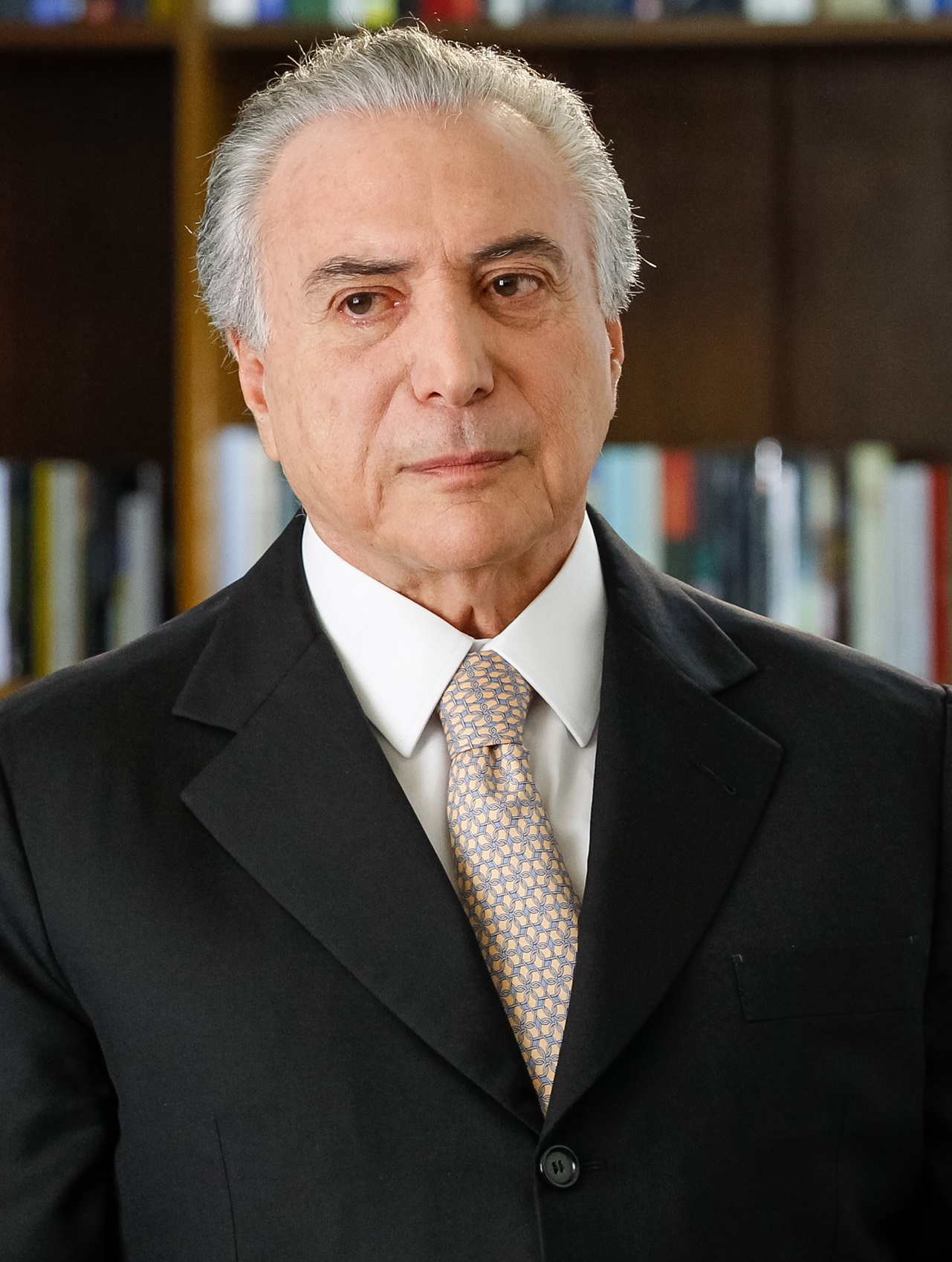
(Brazil) **Brazil**
Michel Temer, President

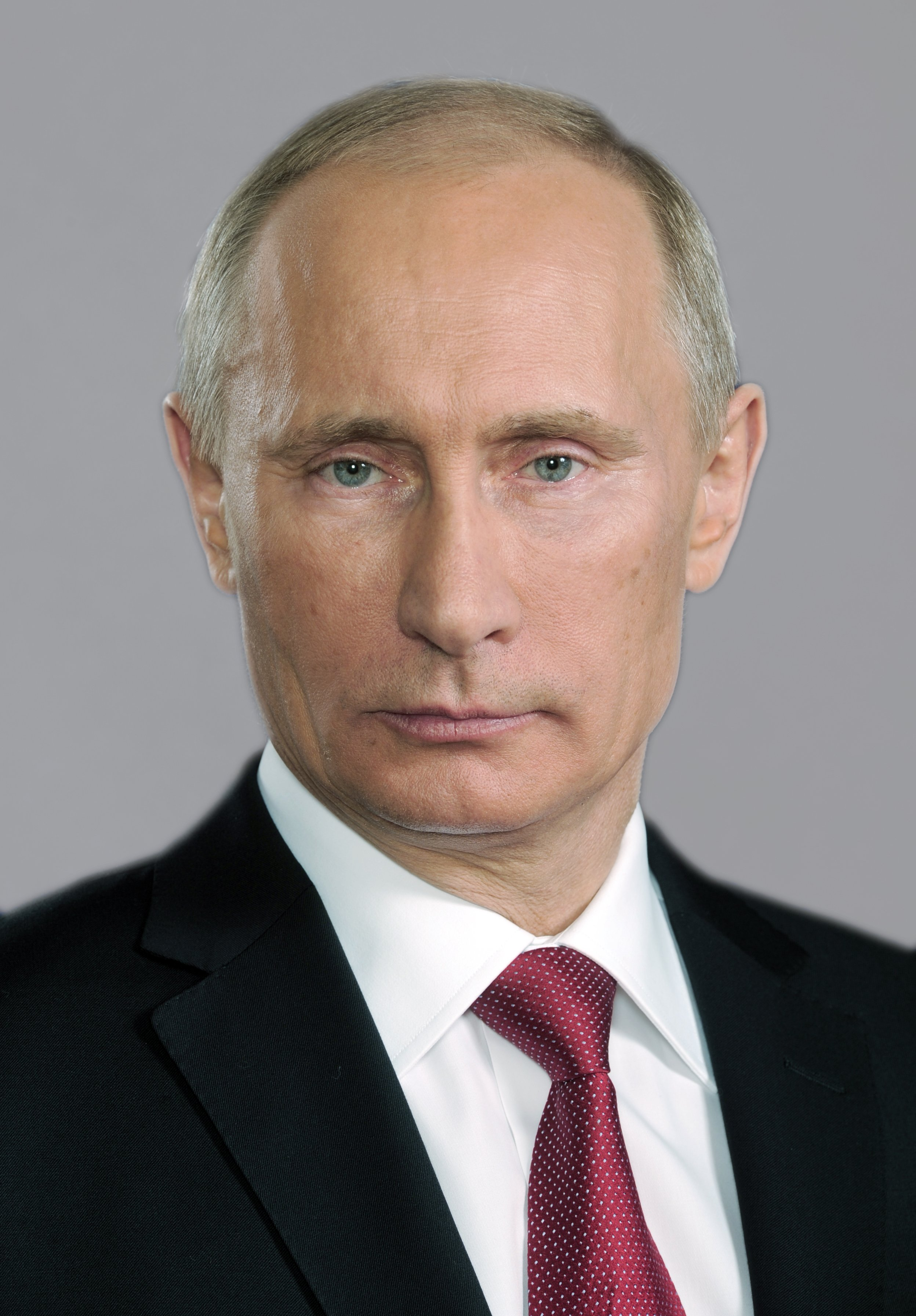
(Russia) **Russia**
Vladimir Putin, President

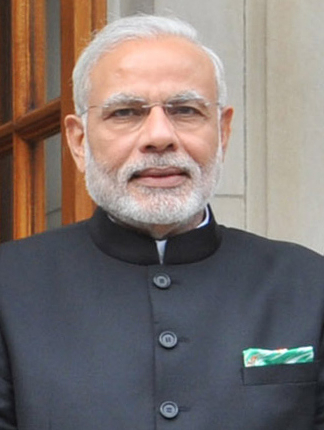
(India) **India**
**Narendra Modi,**
**Prime Minister (Host)**

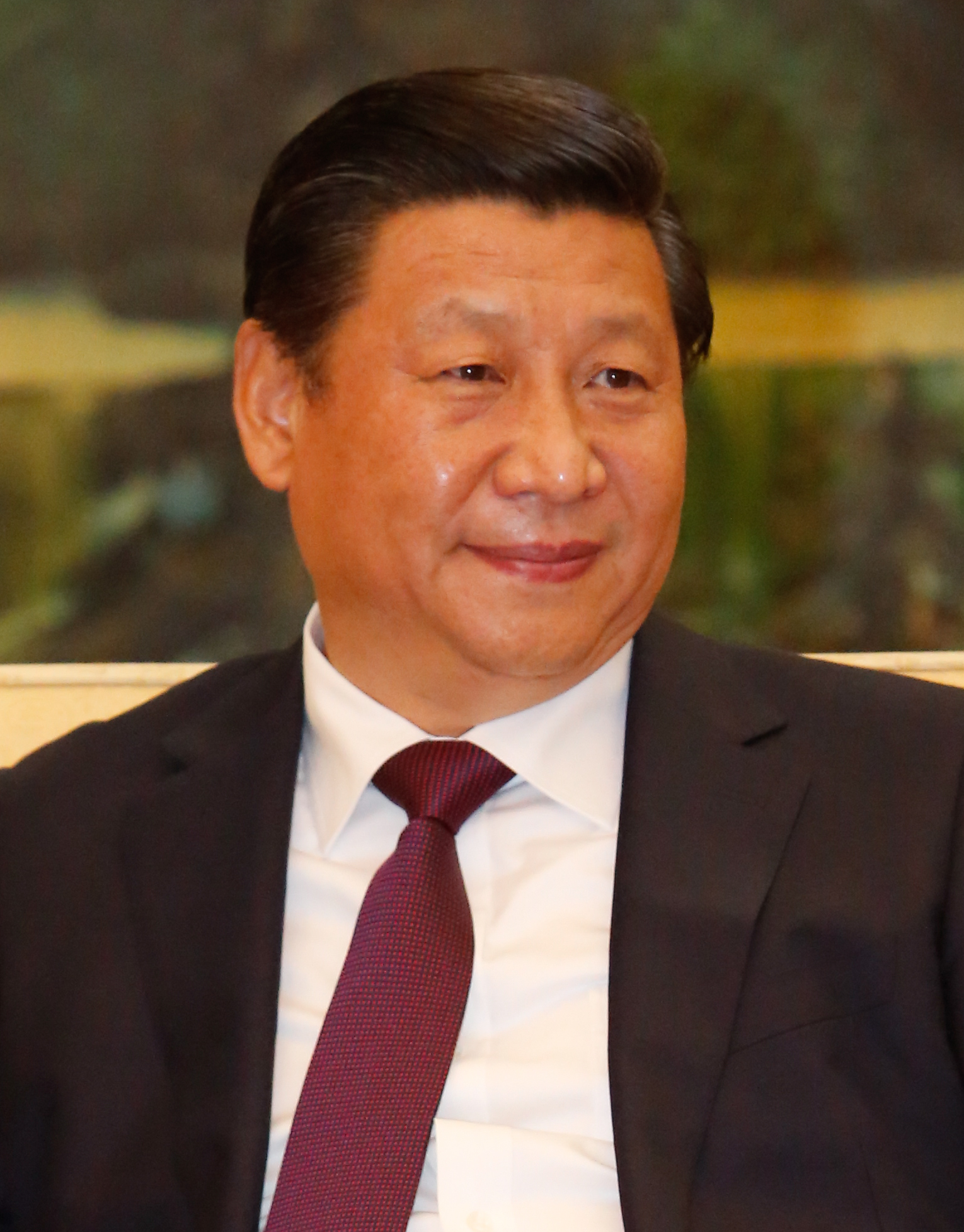
(China) **China**
Xi Jinping, CCP General Secretary and President

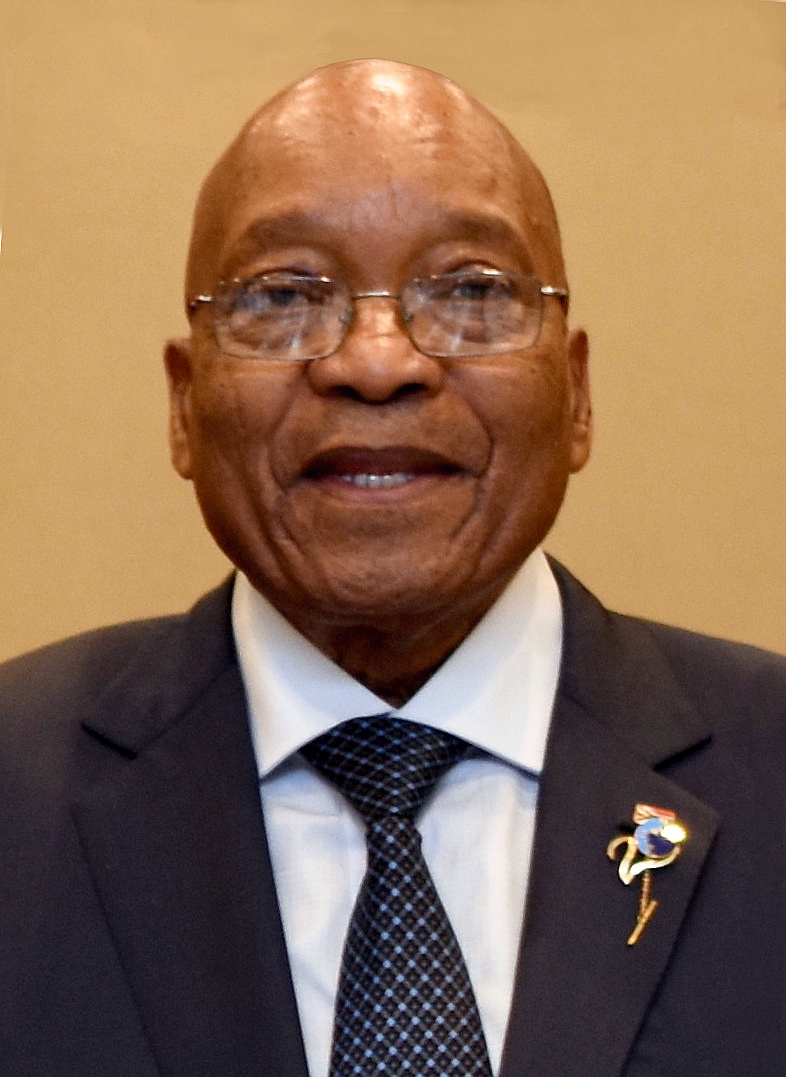
(South Africa) **South Africa**
Jacob Zuma, President
