= Daniil Lopatin =

Russian footballer (born 2000)

Personal information
- Full name: Daniil Aleksandrovich Lopatin
- Date of birth: 20 December 2000 (age 25)
- Place of birth: Izhevsk, Russia
- Height: 1.78 m (5 ft 10 in)
- Position: Forward

Youth career
- FC Zenit-Izhevsk
- –2014: FC Rubin Kazan
- 2014–2019: FC Spartak Moscow

Senior career*
| Years | Team | Apps | (Gls) |
| 2018–2019 | FC Spartak-2 Moscow | 7 | (0) |
| 2019–2020 | FC Rodina Moscow | 19 | (3) |
| 2021 | FC Veles Moscow | 27 | (4) |
| 2022 | FC KAMAZ Naberezhnye Chelny | 9 | (0) |
| 2022–2024 | FC Dynamo Bryansk | 42 | (9) |
| 2025 | FC Dynamo Bryansk | 4 | (0) |
| 2026 | FC Molodechno | 0 | (0) |

International career^{‡}
| 2015–2016 | Russia U-16 | 11 | (4) |
| 2016–2017 | Russia U-17 | 18 | (5) |
| 2017 | Russia U-18 | 1 | (0) |
- * Club domestic league appearances and goals as of 25 May 2026 ‡ National team caps and goals as of 4 October 2017

Daniil Aleksandrovich Lopatin (Russian: Даниил Александрович Лопатин; born 20 December 2000) is a Russian footballer.

== Club career ==
He made his debut in the Russian Football National League for FC Spartak-2 Moscow on 8 September 2018 in a game against FC Nizhny Novgorod.
