= Jawaharlal Nehru Stadium (Margao) =

Multi-purpose stadium in Margao, Goa

Fatorda Stadium
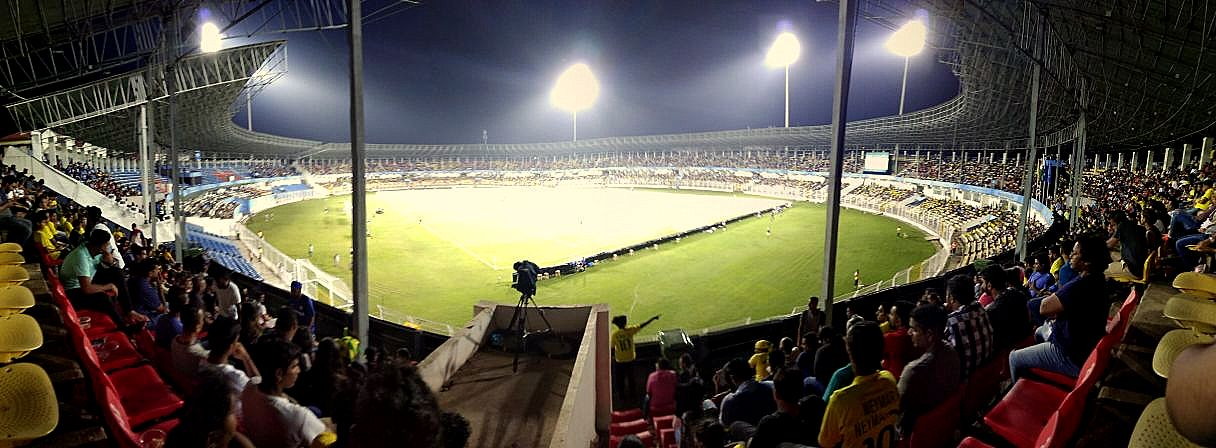
- Fatorda Stadium, Margao at night on a matchday in 2017
- Interactive map of Fatorda Stadium
- Location: Don Bosco Road, Margao, Goa
- Coordinates: 15°17′21″N 73°57′44″E
- Owner: Sports Authority of Goa
- Capacity: 19,000
- Surface: GrassMaster
- Field size: 105 m × 68 m (344 ft × 223 ft)

Construction
- Opened: 1989
- Renovated: 2017

Tenant
- India national football team (1989–present) Goa football team (selected matches) Goa women's football team (selected matches) Churchill Brothers (selected matches) FC Goa (2014–present) Dempo SC (selected matches) Salgaocar FC (selected matches) Vasco SC (selected matches) Sporting Clube de Goa (selected matches)

Fatorda Stadium, officially known as Jawaharlal Nehru Stadium, is a multi-purpose stadium in Margao, Goa, India. The venue has been used to host both football and cricket matches.

It is Goa's only international stadium and has a seating capacity of 19,000. It has hosted 9 One Day Internationals (ODIs) in cricket and hosted various football tournaments, including multiple Indian Super League finals, I-League, I-League 2, AFC Cup, and AFC Champions League. The venue was established in 1989 and is owned and operated by the Sports Authority of Goa. It is currently the home stadium of FC Goa. In the 2020–21 Indian Super League, it was used as one of the centralized home grounds because of the COVID-19 pandemic.

== History ==
=== Beginning ===
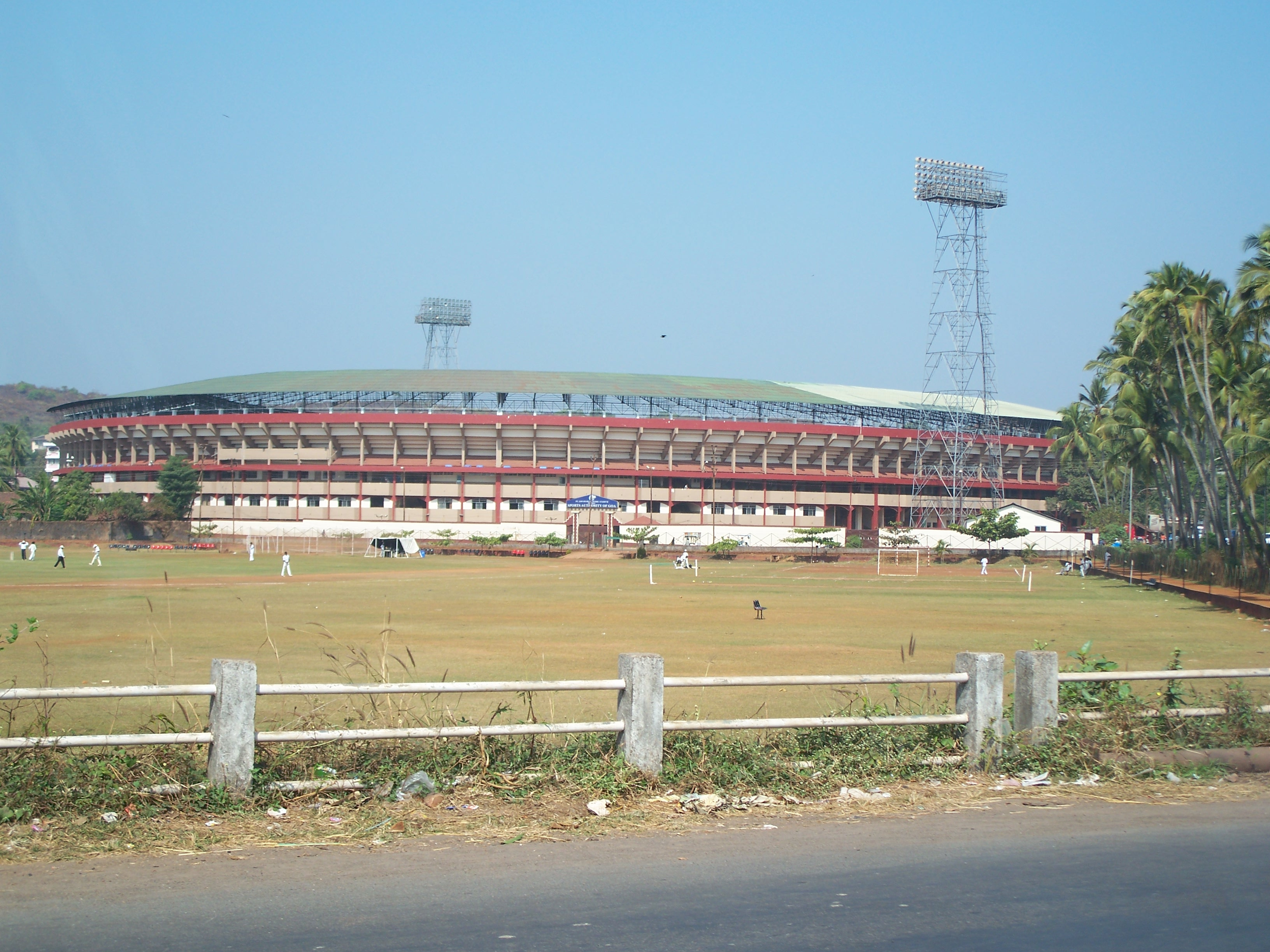
Exterior of the stadium

Fatorda stadium was built in a record six months by the then Sports Minister Monte (D') Cruz. It was opened in 1989 as a football-only stadium but in less than a year was redeveloped to include cricket. On 25 October 1989 the first cricket ODI was played between Australia and Sri Lanka in Nehru Cup.

=== Football clubs using the stadium ===
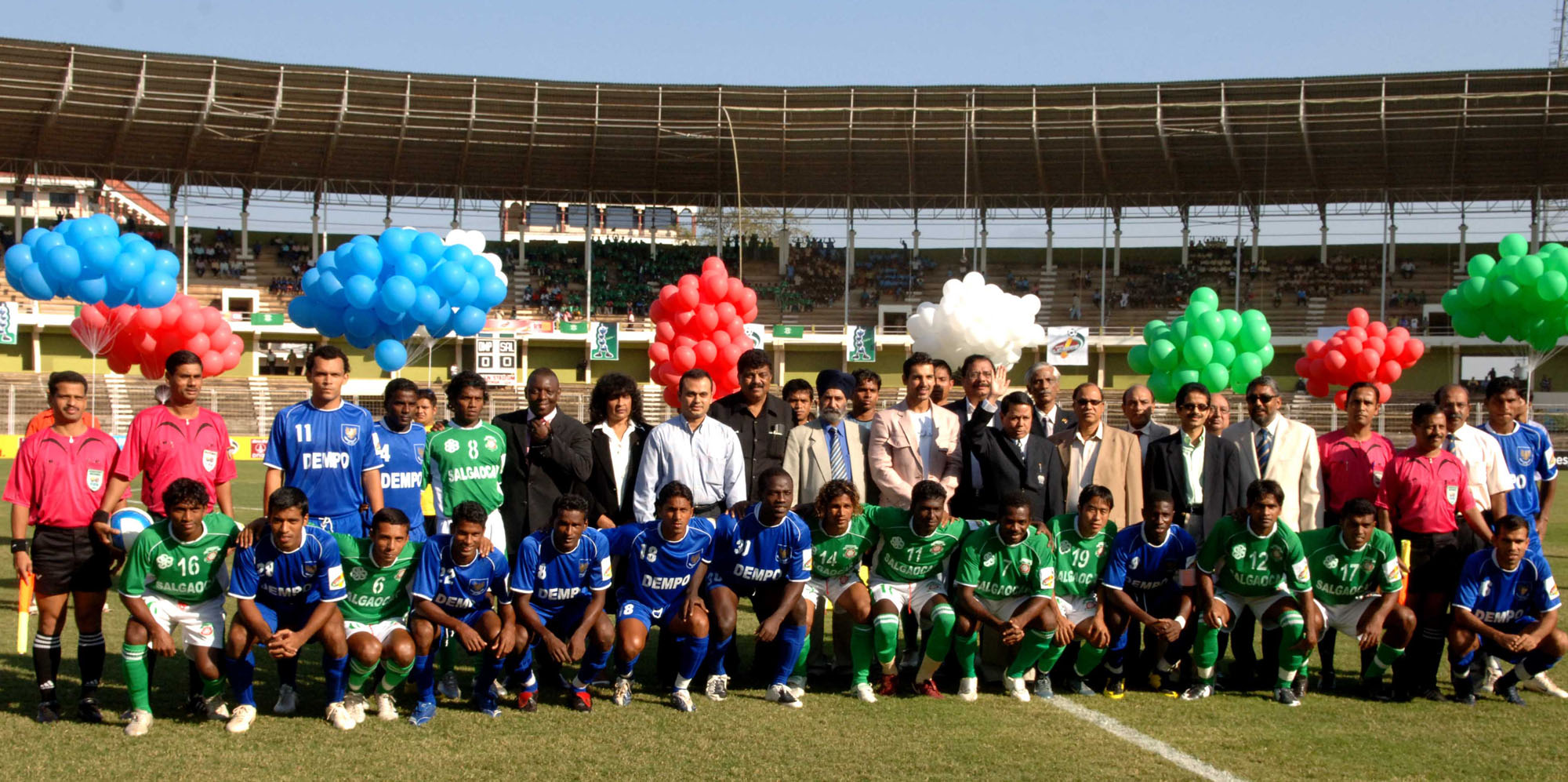
The stadium during a 2007–08 I-League match between Salgaocar and Dempo.

In 2006, before the 2007–08 I-League, all four Goan clubs (Dempo, Churchill Brothers, Salgaocar, and Sporting Clube de Goa) announced that The Fatorda would be used as the home for all four teams' I-League matches. In the next season of I-League, Vasco too used the stadium as home ground. The Indian Super League club FC Goa have been tenants of the stadium since 2014.

== Facilities ==
In 2014 it was upgraded according to the latest FIFA specifications. It is designed with a 20,000 seating capacity. The stadium complex provides two levels of fan seating arrangement along with a VIP area. Facilities include arena lighting, natural turf, broadcast room, TV studio, player dressing rooms, match delegates area, doping control rooms, medical rooms for players and spectators, VIP lounge, corporate boxes, media tribune and media working stations, press conference area, mixed zone area, CCTV cameras, a swimming pool, multipurpose gymnasium and parking facilities. It is regarded as one of the most well maintained football grounds in the Indian subcontinent.

On 1 October 2022, it was announced that India's First Hybrid Pitch will be installed in this Stadium ahead of FIFA U-17 Women's World Cup 2022.

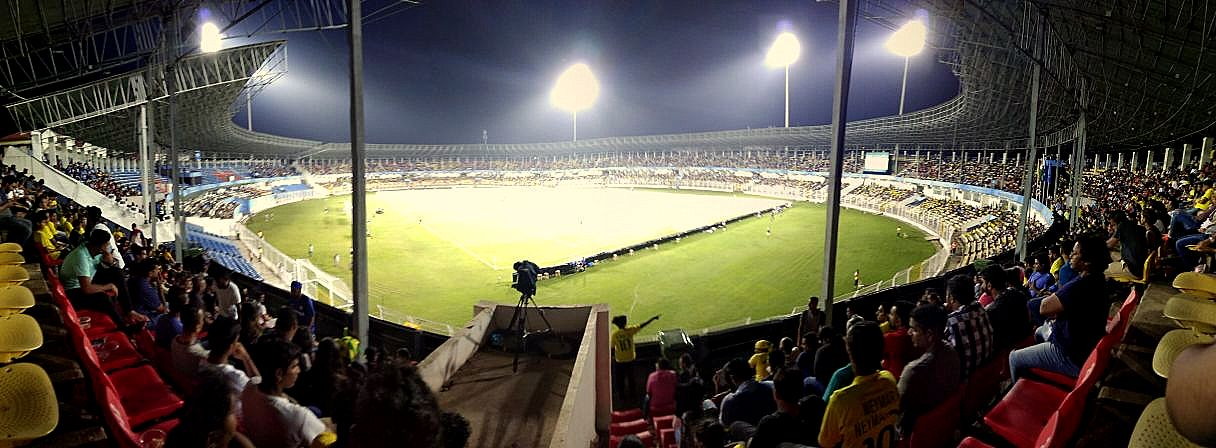
A panoramic view of the stadium

== List of centuries ==
=== Key ===
- * denotes that the batsman was not out.
- Inns. denotes the number of the innings in the match.
- Balls denotes the number of balls faced in an innings.
- NR denotes that the number of balls was not recorded.
- Parentheses next to the player's score denotes his century number at Edgbaston.
- The column title Date refers to the date the match started.
- The column title Result refers to the player's team result.

=== One Day Internationals ===
No.	Score	Player	Team	Balls	Inns.	Opposing team	Date	Result
1	101	V. V. S. Laxman	India	107	1	Australia	6 April 2001	Lost
2	103	Yuvraj Singh	India	76	1	England	3 April 2006	Won

== International cricket five-wicket hauls ==
=== Key ===
Symbol	Meaning
†	The bowler was man of the match
‡	10 or more wickets taken in the match
§	One of two five-wicket hauls by the bowler in the match
Date	Day the Test started or ODI was held
Inn	Innings in which five-wicket haul was taken
Overs	Number of overs bowled
Runs	Number of runs conceded
Wkts	Number of wickets taken
Econ	Runs conceded per over
Batsmen	Batsmen whose wickets were taken
Result	Result of the match

=== ODIs ===
Five-wicket hauls in ODI matches at Fatorda Stadium
No.	Bowler	Date	Team	Opposing team	Inn	Overs	Runs	Wkts	Econ	Batsmen	Result
1	Matthew Hart	26 October 1994	New Zealand	West Indies	1	10	22	5	2.20	Brian Lara; Carl Hooper; Phil Simmons; Jimmy Adams; Courtney Walsh	No result
2	Zaheer Khan	14 February 2007	India	Sri Lanka	1	10	42	5	4.20	Sanath Jayasuriya; Upul Tharanga; Kumar Sangakkara; Farveez Maharoof; Malinga Bandara	India won

== Football ==
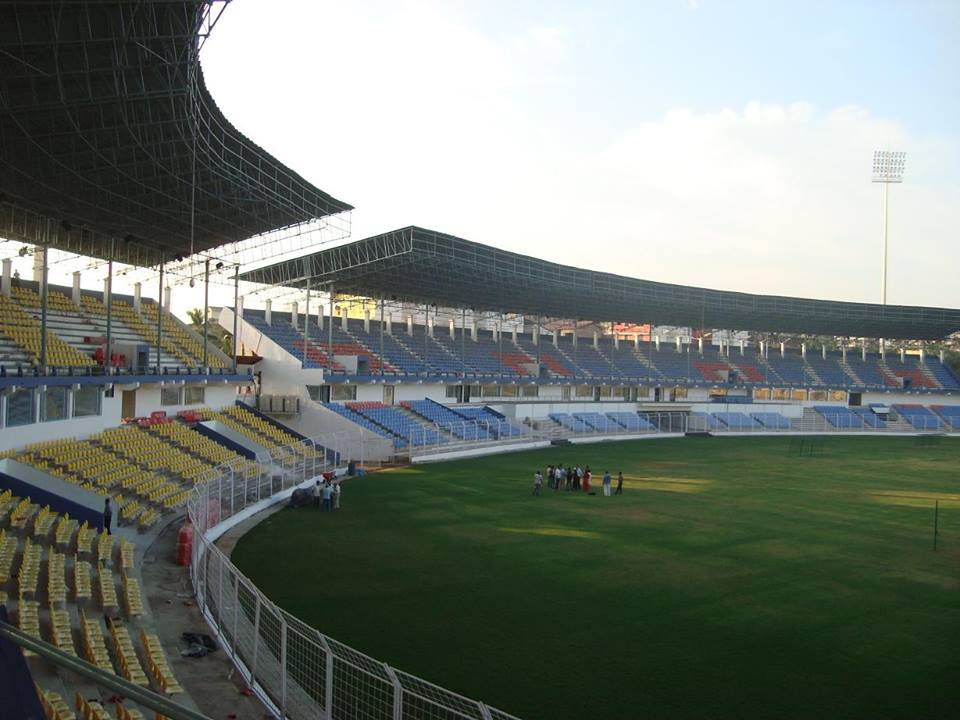
South side of the Stadium

This venue has long been a mainstay of Indian football, having played host to many international games, including India's qualifiers for both the FIFA World Cup and AFC Asian Cup. The stadium has also been used as a home venue for the Goan clubs in AIFF competitions: Churchill Brothers, Dempo, FC Goa, Salgaocar, Sporting Clube de Goa and Vasco

It hosted the semifinals and final of the football event during the 2014 Lusofonia Games.

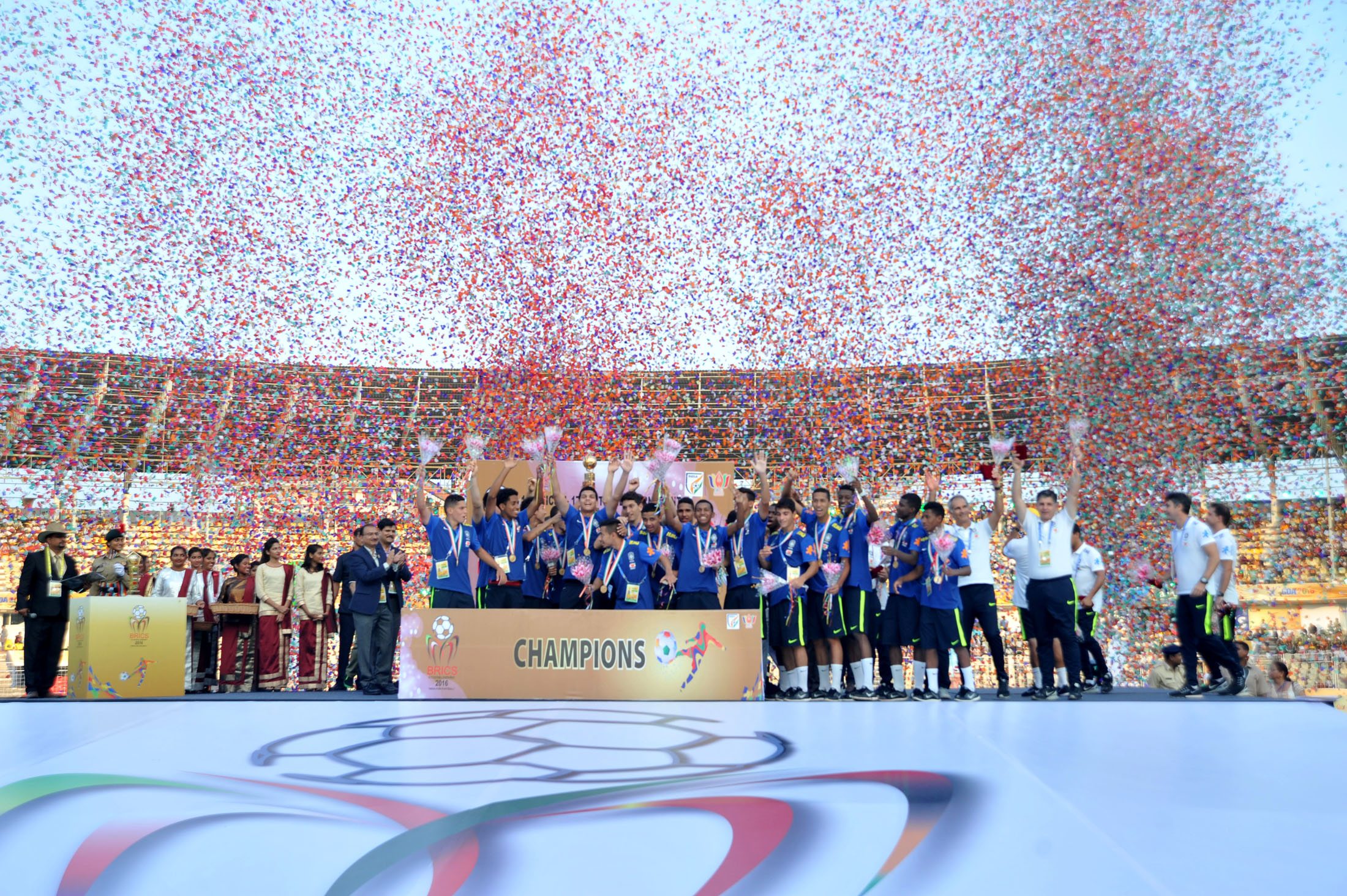
Brazilian team celebrating with the BRICS U-17 Cup trophy at the Fatorda Stadium in 2016.

The matches of 2016 BRICS U-17 Football Cup, the first edition of the tournament, were played at the stadium and Brazilian U-17 team won the trophy.

It was chosen one of the six stadiums to host the 2017 FIFA U-17 World Cup matches in India.

It has hosted the finals of Indian Super League twice in 2015 and 2020. In 2021, the stadium hosted the Group E matches of the AFC Champions League, in which FC Goa competed.

== Cricket ==
Although the stadium was originally built to be a football venue, over the past few years it has been increasingly used to host international cricket matches. Since hosting its first ever international in 1989 between Australia and Sri Lanka, it has played host to seven further One Day Internationals, the most recent being between India and Sri Lanka in 2007. The allocation of cricket matches to the stadium has often upset the Goan football community as it renders them unable to use the venue for hosting football.

== Lusofonia Games ==
The Stadium was renovated for the 2014 Lusofonia Games, which was conducted in Goa. The opening and closing ceremonies of these Games were held at this venue. Football matches of the Lusofonia Games were also held here.

== Average attendances ==
Tenants	League season	Home games	Average attendance
FC Goa	2022–23	10	10,220
FC Goa	2023–24	11	8,642

== See also ==
- List of football stadiums in India
