= 2022 North Bengal International Gold Cup =

International club football tournament by the Bangladesh Football Federation

Tournament details
- Host country: Bangladesh
- Dates: 4–18 November 2022
- Teams: 6 (from 2 countries)
- Venue: 6 (in 6 host cities)

The 2022 North Bengal International Gold Cup was the inaugural edition of the North Bengal International Gold Cup, an international club football tournament, from 4 to 18 November. The draw ceremony was held in Siliguri, West Bengal on 26 October.

== Participant ==
Six clubs contested the tournament.

Club	Appearance
(Bangladesh) FC Uttarbango	1st
(Bangladesh) Rangpur United	1st
(Bangladesh) Kirtankhola FC	1st
(India) Jaigaon FC	1st
(India) United Sikkim FC	1st
(India) United Kurseong FC	1st

== Venues ==
The matches were played at the following six venues.

Nilphamari	Panchagarh	Kurigram
Sheikh Kamal Stadium	Panchagarh District Stadium	Kurigram District Stadium
Capacity: 20,000	Capacity: 10,000	Capacity: 5,000
Location of the stadiums of 2022 North Bengal International Gold Cup
Parbatipur	Bogura	Dinajpur
Parbatipur Football Stadium	Gabtali Football Stadium	Dinajpur District Stadium
Capacity: 5,000	Capacity: 18,000	Capacity: 10,000

== Match dates ==
Phase	Date
Group stage	4–8 November
Semi finals	11–13 November
Third place match	15 November
Final	18 November
