= 2025–26 Women's Futsal League Bangladesh =

Tournament details
- City: 1
- Venue: 1
- Dates: First Leg: 14 – 23 May 2026; Second Leg: 31 July 2026 – 13 September 2026
- Teams: 11

Tournament statistics
- Matches played: 59
- Goals scored: 642 (10.88 per match)

The 2025–26 Women's Futsal League Bangladesh is the inaugural season of top tier women's futsal league in Bangladesh. Its organised by the Bangladesh Football Federation (BFF). The tournament started from 14 May. A total of 11 teams participate.

== Venue ==
Venue in Bangladesh
Mirpur, Dhaka
Shaheed Suhrawardy Indoor Stadium
Capacity: 4,123

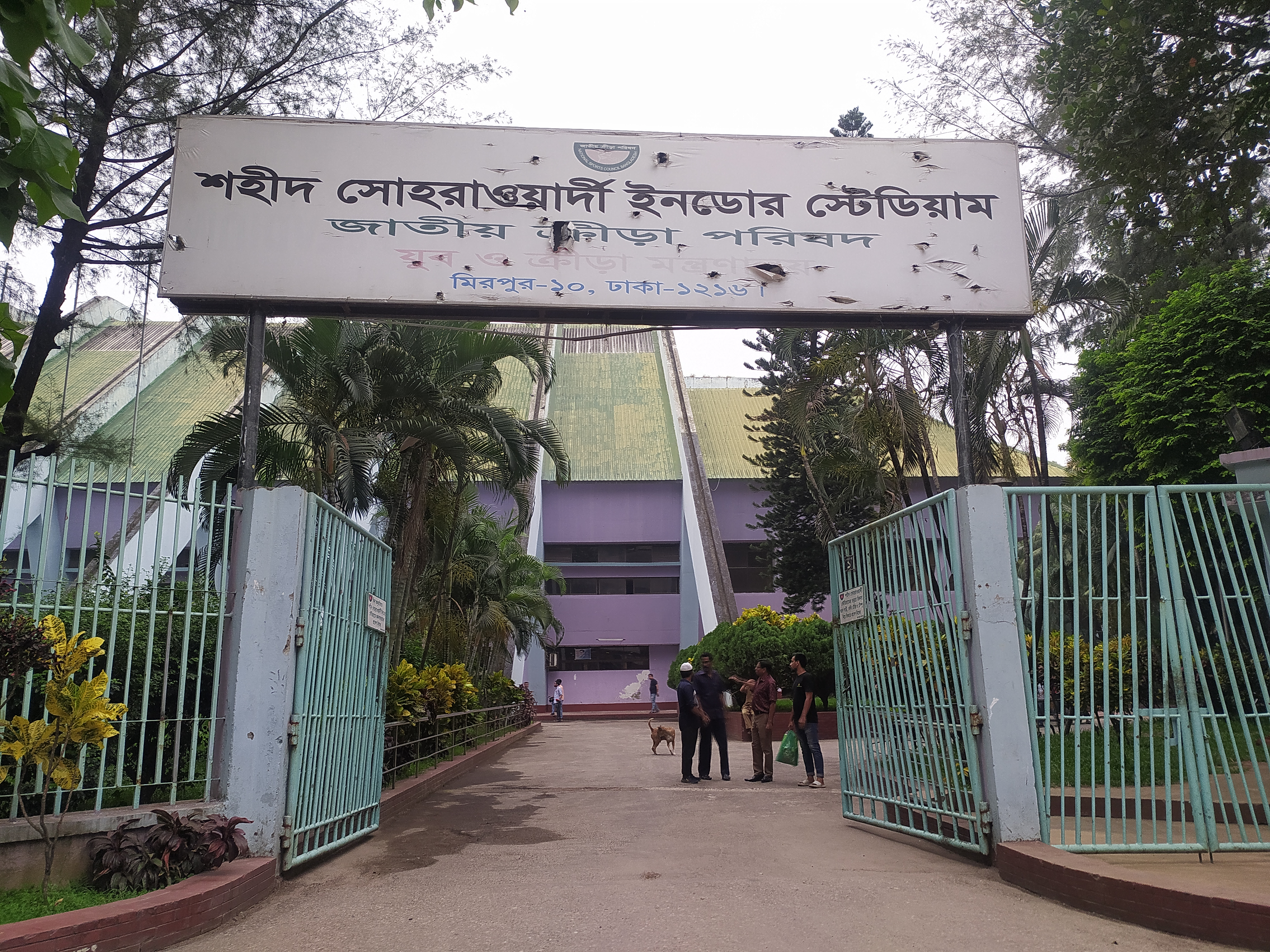
Main entrance of the Shaheed Suhrawardy Indoor Stadium

== Participating teams ==
No.	Team	Appearance	Previous best
1	Ansar & VDP Football Club	1st	—N/a
2	BKSP Football Club	1st	—N/a
3	Dhaka Athletic Club	1st	—N/a
4	IM 10 FC	1st	—N/a
5	Techvill Futsal Club	1st	—N/a
6	Bangladesh Army Sports Club Limited (BASCL)	1st	—N/a
7	Xenon FC	1st	—N/a
8	Chandpur Football Club	1st	—N/a
9	Fakir FC	1st	—N/a
10	Sports Field Logistics	1st	—N/a
11	Warrior Sports Academy	1st	—N/a

== Match officials ==
Referee 1

- Sohana Khatun

Referee 2

- Srabonty Akhter

Referee 3

- Hasnat Jaman

Time keeper

- Abul Kalam Rumon

Second referee

- Saraban Tahura (†)

Assistant referee

- Srabonti (†)

Fourth official / timekeeper

- Aleya Begum (†)
- Afrin (†)

Match commissioner

- Azad Rahman
- Bharat Chandra Gour

(†): Performed as referee & assistant referee.

== Standings ==
Pos	Team	Pld	W	D	L	GF	GA	GD	Pts
1	IM 10 FC	12	12	0	0	137	16	+121	36
2	Bangladesh Army	13	9	1	3	124	41	+83	28
3	Techvill FC	11	8	0	3	68	18	+50	24
4	BKSP	10	7	1	2	87	26	+61	22
5	Ansar & VDP	10	6	0	4	53	49	+4	18
6	Warrior Sports	10	5	0	5	52	50	+2	15
7	Fakir FC	10	3	0	7	31	48	−17	9
8	Xenon FC	10	3	0	7	27	58	−31	9
9	Chandpur FC	10	1	1	8	13	66	−53	4
10	Sports Field	10	1	1	8	18	99	−81	4
11	Dhaka AC	10	1	0	9	15	154	−139	3

Source: BFF

== Matches ==
- All times are local UTC+6.

=== 1st leg ===
14 May 2026
17:00
Match 1

Bangladesh Army Sports Club Limited (BASCL)	3–3	BKSP Football Club
Nowshon 3'; Eite Akter 24'; Mitu 33'	Report	Runa 2'24"; Moni 22'

Shaheed Suhrawardy Indoor Stadium, Mirpur, Dhaka
15 May 2026
15:00
Match 2

Techvill Futsal Club	8–1	Chandpur Football Club
	Report

Shaheed Suhrawardy Indoor Stadium, Mirpur, Dhaka
Referee: Shohana Khatun
15 May 2026
19:00
Match 3

IM 10 FC	14–3	Ansar & VDP Football Club
	Report

Shaheed Suhrawardy Indoor Stadium, Mirpur, Dhaka
Referee: Shohana Khatun
16 May 2026
15:00
Match 4

Warrior Sports Academy	21–0	Dhaka Athletic Club
	Report

Shaheed Suhrawardy Indoor Stadium, Mirpur, Dhaka
Referee: Shohana Khatun
16 May 2026
19:00
Match 5

Fakir FC	1–3	Xenon FC
	Report

Shaheed Suhrawardy Indoor Stadium, Mirpur, Dhaka
17 May 2026
18:00
Match 6

BKSP Football Club	13–0	Sports Field Logistics
Ritu 2'; Runa 9'25" (30), 35'37"; Nurjahan 10'15"; Anamika 16'; Reya 19'20" (25); Mishu 36'	Report

Shaheed Suhrawardy Indoor Stadium, Mirpur, Dhaka
18 May 2026
18:00
Match 7

Bangladesh Army Sports Club Limited (BASCL)	12–3	Ansar & VDP Football Club
	Report

Shaheed Suhrawardy Indoor Stadium, Mirpur, Dhaka
19 May 2026
18:00
Match 8

IM 10 FC	18–0	Chandpur Football Club
	Report

Shaheed Suhrawardy Indoor Stadium, Mirpur, Dhaka
20 May 2026
18:00
Match 9

Techvill Futsal Club	2–1	Warrior Sports Academy
	Report

Shaheed Suhrawardy Indoor Stadium, Mirpur, Dhaka
21 May 2026
17:00
Match 10

Xenon FC	3–4	Dhaka Athletic Club
	Report

Shaheed Suhrawardy Indoor Stadium, Mirpur, Dhaka
21 May 2026
19:00
Match 11

Fakir FC	8–1	Sports Field Logistics
	Report

Shaheed Suhrawardy Indoor Stadium, Mirpur, Dhaka
22 May 2026
15:00
Match 12

IM 10 FC	9–4	BKSP Football Club
	Report

Shaheed Suhrawardy Indoor Stadium, Mirpur, Dhaka
22 May 2026
19:00
Match 13

Techvill Futsal Club	5–2	Ansar & VDP Football Club
	Report

Shaheed Suhrawardy Indoor Stadium, Mirpur, Dhaka
23 May 2026
15:00
Match 14

Xenon FC	3–5	Warrior Sports Academy
	Report

Shaheed Suhrawardy Indoor Stadium, Mirpur, Dhaka
23 May 2026
19:00
Match 15

Bangladesh Army Sports Club Limited (BASCL)	10–1	Fakir FC
	Report

Shaheed Suhrawardy Indoor Stadium, Mirpur, Dhaka

=== 2nd leg ===
31 July 2026
15:00
Match 1

Fakir FC	10–2	Dhaka Athletic Club
	Report

Shaheed Suhrawardy Indoor Stadium, Mirpur, Dhaka
Referee: Sohana Khatun
31 July 2026
19:00
Match 2

IM 10 FC	26–0	Sports Field Logistics
	Report

Shaheed Suhrawardy Indoor Stadium, Mirpur, Dhaka
Referee: Saraban Tahura
1 August 2026
15:00
Match 3

Xenon FC	1–8	Ansar & VDP Football Club
	Report

Shaheed Suhrawardy Indoor Stadium, Mirpur, Dhaka
1 August 2026
19:00
Match 4

Bangladesh Army Sports Club Limited (BASCL)	5–2	Warrior Sports Academy
	Report

Shaheed Suhrawardy Indoor Stadium, Mirpur, Dhaka
2 August 2026
15:00
Match 5

Chandpur Football Club	5–3	Dhaka Athletic Club
	Report

Shaheed Suhrawardy Indoor Stadium, Mirpur, Dhaka
2 August 2026
19:00
Match 6

Techvill Futsal Club	5–1	BKSP Football Club
	Report

Shaheed Suhrawardy Indoor Stadium, Mirpur, Dhaka
3 August 2026
14:30
Match 7

Sports Field Logistics	4–11	Xenon FC
	Report

Shaheed Suhrawardy Indoor Stadium, Mirpur, Dhaka
3 August 2026
19:00
Match 8

Fakir FC	3–6	Ansar & VDP Football Club
	Report

Shaheed Suhrawardy Indoor Stadium, Mirpur, Dhaka
4 August 2026
14:30
Match 9

Bangladesh Army Sports Club Limited (BASCL)	16–0	Chandpur Football Club
	Report

Shaheed Suhrawardy Indoor Stadium, Mirpur, Dhaka
4 August 2026
19:00
Match 10

IM10 FC	10–2	Warrior Sports Academy
	Report

Shaheed Suhrawardy Indoor Stadium, Mirpur, Dhaka
5 August 2026
14:30
Match 11

Ansar & VDP Football Club	1–9	BKSP Football Club
	Report

Shaheed Suhrawardy Indoor Stadium, Mirpur, Dhaka
5 August 2026
19:00
Match 12

Techvill Futsal Club	4–0	Xenon FC
	Report

Shaheed Suhrawardy Indoor Stadium, Mirpur, Dhaka
6 August 2026
14:30
Match 13

Bangladesh Army Sports Club Limited (BASCL)	13–1	Sports Field Logistics
	Report

Shaheed Suhrawardy Indoor Stadium, Mirpur, Dhaka
6 August 2026
19:00
Match 14

Dhaka Athletic Club	0–19	IM 10 FC
	Report

Shaheed Suhrawardy Indoor Stadium, Mirpur, Dhaka
9 August 2026
14:30
Match 15

Techvill Futsal Club	20–1	Dhaka Athletic Club
	Report

Shaheed Suhrawardy Indoor Stadium, Mirpur, Dhaka
9 August 2026
19:00
Match 16

Fakir FC	2–10	BKSP Football Club
	Report

Shaheed Suhrawardy Indoor Stadium, Mirpur, Dhaka
10 August 2026
14:30
Match 17

Sports Field Logistics	1–8	Ansar & VDP Football Club
	Report

Shaheed Suhrawardy Indoor Stadium, Mirpur, Dhaka
10 August 2026
19:00
Match 18

Xenon FC	3–2	Chandpur Football Club
	Report

Shaheed Suhrawardy Indoor Stadium, Mirpur, Dhaka
11 August 2026
14:30
Match 19

BKSP Football Club	6–3	Warrior Sports Academy
	Report

Shaheed Suhrawardy Indoor Stadium, Mirpur, Dhaka
11 August 2026
19:00
Match 20

IM 10 FC	7–2	Bangladesh Army Sports Club Limited
	Report

Shaheed Suhrawardy Indoor Stadium, Mirpur, Dhaka
12 August 2026
14:30
Match 21

Sports Field Logistics	1–1	Chandpur Football Club
	Report

Shaheed Suhrawardy Indoor Stadium, Mirpur, Dhaka
12 August 2026
19:00
Match 22

Techvill Futsal Club	4–1	Fakir FC
	Report

Shaheed Suhrawardy Indoor Stadium, Mirpur, Dhaka
13 August 2026
14:30
Match 23

Warrior Sports Academy	3–4	Ansar & VDP Football Club
	Report

Shaheed Suhrawardy Indoor Stadium, Mirpur, Dhaka
13 August 2026
19:00
Match 24

Bangladesh Army Sports Club Limited	19–1	Xenon FC
	Report

Shaheed Suhrawardy Indoor Stadium, Mirpur, Dhaka
14 August 2026
14:30
Match 25

BKSP Football Club	29–1	Dhaka Athletic Club
	Report

Shaheed Suhrawardy Indoor Stadium, Mirpur, Dhaka
14 August 2026
19:00
Match 26

IM 10 FC	4–0	Techvill Futsal Club
	Report

Shaheed Suhrawardy Indoor Stadium, Mirpur, Dhaka
15 August 2026
14:30
Match 27

Ansar & VDP Football Club	4–1	Chandpur Football Club
	Report

Shaheed Suhrawardy Indoor Stadium, Mirpur, Dhaka
15 August 2026
19:00
Match 28

Fakir FC	2–3	Warrior Sports Academy
	Report

Shaheed Suhrawardy Indoor Stadium, Mirpur, Dhaka
16 August 2026
19:00
Match 29

Bangladesh Army Sports Club Limited	25–1	Dhaka Athletic Club
	Report

Shaheed Suhrawardy Indoor Stadium, Mirpur, Dhaka
17 August 2026
14:30
Match 30

Warrior Sports Academy	2–1	Chandpur Football Club
	Report

Shaheed Suhrawardy Indoor Stadium, Mirpur, Dhaka
17 August 2026
19:00
Match 31

Techvill Futsal Club	9–1	Sports Field Logistics
	Report

Shaheed Suhrawardy Indoor Stadium, Mirpur, Dhaka
18 August 2026
19:00
Match 32

IM 10 FC	7–1	Xenon FC
	Report

Shaheed Suhrawardy Indoor Stadium, Mirpur, Dhaka
19 August 2026
14:30
Match 33

Dhaka Athletic Club	3–8	Sports Field Logistics
	Report

Shaheed Suhrawardy Indoor Stadium, Mirpur, Dhaka
19 August 2026
19:00
Match 34

Fakir FC	3–1	Chandpur Football Club
	Report

Shaheed Suhrawardy Indoor Stadium, Mirpur, Dhaka
20 August 2026
14:30
Match 35

BKSP Football Club	4–1	Xenon FC
	Report

Shaheed Suhrawardy Indoor Stadium, Mirpur, Dhaka
20 August 2026
19:00
Match 36

Techvill Futsal Club	4–6	Bangladesh Army Sports Club Limited
	Report

Shaheed Suhrawardy Indoor Stadium, Mirpur, Dhaka
21 August 2026
14:30
Match 37

Warrior Sports Academy	10–1	Sports Field Logistics
	Report

Shaheed Suhrawardy Indoor Stadium, Mirpur, Dhaka
21 August 2026
19:00
Match 38

IM 10 FC	8–0	Fakir FC
	Report

Shaheed Suhrawardy Indoor Stadium, Mirpur, Dhaka
22 August 2026
14:30
Match 39

BKSP Football Club	8–1	Chandpur Football Club
	Report

Shaheed Suhrawardy Indoor Stadium, Mirpur, Dhaka
22 August 2026
19:00
Match 40

Dhaka Athletic Club	0–14	Ansar & VDP Football Club
	Report

Shaheed Suhrawardy Indoor Stadium, Mirpur, Dhaka

== Playoffs ==
9 September 2026
6:00 PM
Match 41 Women's Semifinal 1

IM 10 FC	10–1	Bangladesh Army Sports Club Limited (BASCL)
	Report

Shaheed Suhrawardy Indoor Stadium, Mirpur, Dhaka
10 September 2026
6:00 PM
Match 42 Women's Eliminator

Techvill Futsal Club	3–4	BKSP Football Club
	Report

Shaheed Suhrawardy Indoor Stadium, Mirpur, Dhaka
11 September 2026
6:00 PM
Match 43 Semifinal 2

BKSP Football Club	4-13	Bangladesh Army Sports Club Limited (BASCL)
	Report

Shaheed Suhrawardy Indoor Stadium, Mirpur, Dhaka

== Grand Final ==
13 September 2026
5:30 PM
Match 44 Grand Final

IM 10 FC	5–3	Bangladesh Army Sports Club Limited (BASCL)
	Report

Shaheed Suhrawardy Indoor Stadium, Mirpur, Dhaka

== Awards ==
Champion	Runner-up	3rd place	4th place
IM 10 FC	Bangladesh Army Sports Club Limited (BASCL)	Techvill Futsal Club	BKSP

== Broadcasting ==
Broadcaster	Territory
T Sports	Bangladesh
BFF TV (worldwide)	Bangladesh

== See also ==
- Men's Futsal League Bangladesh
- Women's Futsal League Bangladesh
- 2025–26 Men's Futsal League Bangladesh
