= Mishrat Jahan Moushumi =

Bangladeshi footballer (born 2001)

Personal information
- Full name: Mosammat Mishrat Jahan Moushumi
- Date of birth: 8 June 2001 (age 25)
- Place of birth: Palichara, Rangpur, Bangladesh
- Position: Midfielder

Youth career
- 2011–2013: Palichara Primary Government School

Senior career*
Years	Team	Apps	(Gls)
2020–2022	Bashundhara Kings	20	(4)

International career^{‡}
2013–2015	Bangladesh U14	8	(4)
2014–2017	Bangladesh U16	11	(3)
2018–2020	Bangladesh U19	10	(3)
2014–2019	Bangladesh	20	(1)
Medal record
Women's football
Representing Bangladesh
SAFF Women's Championship
Runner-up	2016 India
South Asian Games
Bronze medal – third place	2016 India
SAFF U-20 Women's Championship
Winner	2018 Bhutan
Bangamata U-19 Women's International Gold Cup
Winner	2019 Bangladesh
AFC U-14 Girls' Regional C'ship – South and Central
Winner	2015 Bangladesh	Bangladesh U14
- * Club domestic league appearances and goals as of 9 December 2020 ‡ National team caps and goals as of 26 September 2021

Mosammat Mishrat Jahan Moushumi (Bengali: মোসাম্মত মিসরাত জাহাঁ মৌসুমী, Bengali pronunciation: [mosamːɔt misrat dʒaɦã mouʃumi]; born 8 June 2001) is a Bangladeshi professional women's footballer who plays as a midfielder or winger.

Moushumi has captained the Bangladesh women's national U19 team which won the 2018 SAFF U-18 Women's Championship. She was also the member of AFC U-14 Girls' Regional Championship – South and Central winning Bangladesh U-14 team in Nepal in 2015. She played all matches at 2017 AFC U-16 Women's Championship qualification, which held in Dhaka, Bangladesh.

== Early years ==
Mishrat Jahan Moushumi was born on 8 June 2001 in Palichara, Rangpur.

== Early career ==
Moushumi made her debut in the Bangamata Sheikh Fazilatunnesa Mujib Gold Cup Football Tournament in 2011, representing No. 1 Palichara Government Primary School in Rangpur, with her team finishing as runners-up. She returned to the tournament in 2012, when her school won the title. Her performances subsequently earned her selection for the Bangladesh under-14 national team.

== Club career ==
Bashundhara Kings signed Moushumi in January 2020 ahead of the 2020 Bangladesh Women's Football League. At the time, she was a midfielder for the Bangladesh national team and captain of the Bangladesh U20 team. The league marked her first experience playing in a domestic or overseas club competition.

Moushumi made her debut for Bashundhara Kings as a starter against Begum Anowara on 22 February 2020. She scored twice in the 12–0 victory, finding the net in the 40th and 41st minutes. On 16 March, the BFF suspended the Bangladesh Premier League and Women's Football League until 31 March due to the COVID-19 pandemic. The women's league subsequently resumed later that year.

On 24 November, Moushumi scored twice in a match against MK Gallactico Sylhet, in the fifth and 18th minutes. Although primarily deployed as a midfielder, she also occasionally played as a winger during the season. She featured in every match of the 2020 Women's Football League campaign as Bashundhara Kings completed an unbeaten title-winning season. The competition's return, after a six-year hiatus, marked the resumption of the league following its previous edition in 2013.

== International career ==
=== 2013–17: Success at youth level ===
Moushumi was selected to the Bangladesh U16 team for the 2015 AFC U-16 Women's Championship qualification – Group B matches in 2014. Bangladesh participated in the AFC U-14 Girls' Regional Championship – South and Central held in Nepal in 2015. Moushumi was selected to the Bangladesh U14 women's team for that coming tournament.

"Moushumi is a type of player who will serve whenever the team requires. Whenever there is a defensive counter-attack, then only Moushumi knows how to handle the situation."

— Head coach Golam Robbani outlines Moushumi's importance to the team.

She also played all the matches of AFC U-14 Girls' Regional Championship – South and Central, which held in Nepal in 2015, where Bangladesh U-14 Girls' became Champion. Bangladesh women's national U16 football team played the qualifier for the 2017 AFC U-16 Women's Championship. And, she played all the matches in 2017 AFC U-16 Women's Championship qualification – Group C, where Bangladesh became group C champion. Being group C champion, Bangladesh U16 team have qualified for the 2017 AFC U-16 Women's Championship, which held in Thailand in September 2017.

=== 2018–19: SAFF U-18 Women's & Bangamata U-19 Women's International Gold Cup ===
Mishrat Jahan Moushumi was named the captain of the Bangladesh women's national U19 team. Under her captaincy they won the 2018 SAFF U-18 Women's Championship and Bangamata U-19 Women's International Gold Cup in 2019. She later played in the 2019 AFC U-19 Women's Championship qualification.

=== 2014: Senior team debut, SAFF Women's Championship semi-final ===
In recognition of her achievements with the age level, Moushumi was selected to Bangladesh women's national football team for 2014 SAFF Women's Championship. Bangladesh were in the Group A, where they became the Group A runners-up, so they entered the Knockout stage and end as a semi-finalist.

=== 2016–2018: South Asian Games - Bronze and SAFF final ===
Moushumi was selected to Bangladesh women's national football team for 2016 South Asian Games, where they became third in the women's football category and won Bronze. Also she was in the team for 2016 SAFF Women's Championship.Bangladesh were in the Group B. She played two of the group B matches and being group B unbeaten champion, Bangladesh demolish Maldives 6–0 to barge in the semi-final into SAFF Championship final where they lost against India and became Runner-up. And in 2018, she also played in the 2020 AFC Women's Olympic Qualifying Tournament.

=== 2019 and later: SAFF Women's Championship semi-final ===
Moushumi was selected for 2019 SAFF Women's Championship. Bangladesh were in the Group A. She played two of the group A matches. Moushumi scored the first goal for Bangladesh in the 46th minute from a header win against Bhutan by 2–0 in 2019 SAFF Women's Championship which advanced Bangladesh through to the semi-finals with a match in hand. She also played the second group match against Nepal as a starter. In semi-final Bangladesh did face India where they lost that match.

== Career statistics ==
=== International goals ===
No.	Date	Venue	Opponent	Score	Result	Competition	Ref
1	14 March 2019	Sahid Rangsala, Nepal	Bhutan	1–0	2–0	SAFF Women's Championship	

== Honours ==
=== Club ===
Bashundhara Kings Women

- Bangladesh Women's Football League
  - Winners (3): 2019–20, 2020–21, 2021-22

=== International ===
- SAFF Women's Championship

Runner-up : 2016

- South Asian Games

Bronze : 2016

- SAFF U-20 Women's Championship

Champion (1): 2018

- Bangamata U-19 Women's International Gold Cup

Champion trophy shared (1): 2019

- AFC U-14 Girls' Regional C'ship – South and Central

Bangladesh U-14 Girls'
Champion : 2015
