= Bangladesh Super League =

- Founded: 18 January 2016
- Country: Bangladesh
- Confederation: AFC
- Number of clubs: 12
- Level on pyramid: 1
- Relegation to: BFL
- Domestic cup: Fed Cup
- International cup: ACL
- Broadcaster(s): BTV

Bangladesh Super League (BSL) was a planned professional football league, sanctioned by Bangladesh Football Federation, that was meant to represent the sport's highest level in Bangladesh. The league was inaugurated by Bangladesh Football Federation on 18 January 2016. The league was to be contested by eight clubs, with the first season scheduled for 2017.

The tournament was cancelled due to few stadiums and problems with infrastructure.

== Foundation ==
On 18 January 2016, the Bangladesh Football Federation entered a 15-year deal with Saif Powertech and Celebrity Management Group. The 70-crores deal gave Powertech-CMG exclusive commercial rights to sponsorship, advertising, broadcasting, merchandising, video, franchising and rights to create a new football league.

The league will get technical assistance from Bangladesh Football Federation, which is in talks with Union of European Football Associations and South American Football Confederation for assistance with foreign coaches and management staff. Each team will have minimum five foreign players in playing eleven.

== Teams ==
Proposed Teams
Team	City	Stadium	Capacity
Dhaka City	Dhaka	Bangabandhu National Stadium	36,000
Comilla City	Comilla	Shaheed Dhirendranath Datta Stadium	18,000
Rajshahi Silk City	Rajshahi	Muktijuddho Sriti Stadium	15,000
Khulna Sundarban FC	Khulna	Khulna District Stadium	12,000
FC Barisal	Barisal	Sraheed Abdur Rab Serniabad Stadium	30,000
Sylhet United	Sylhet	Sylhet District Stadium	18,500
Rangpur United	Rangpur	Sheikh Rasel Stadium	25,000
FC Mymensingh	Mymensingh	Rafiq Uddin Bhuiyan Stadium	25,000
Chittagong Port FC	Chittagong	M. A. Aziz Stadium	30,000
Faridpur Padma FC	Faridpur	Sheikh Jamal Stadium	30,000

== Rights holder ==
Saif Powertec Ltd. along with CMG have already bought the tournament rights for 15 years.

== Logo ==
On 28 February 2016, the BSL logo was unveiled at a grand ceremony at the Bangabandhu National Stadium, Dhaka.
