= North Bengal International Gold Cup =

International club football tournament held in Bangladesh

- Founded: 2022; 4 years ago
- Teams: 6
- 2022 North Bengal International Gold Cup

North Bengal International Gold Cup is an international club football tournament held in Bangladesh. The inaugural edition took place in 2022. It is hosted by FC Uttor Bongo and Bangladesh Football Federation (BFF), under supervision of the Centre for Bangladesh India Friendship. The matches were held across six venues.

== Participants ==
Club	Country	Year
(Bangladesh) FC Uttarbango	Dinajpur	2022
(Bangladesh) Rangpur United	Rangpur	2022
(Bangladesh) Kirtankhola FC	Barisal	2022
(India) Jaigaon FC	Jaigaon	2022
(India) United Sikkim FC	Gangtok	2022
(India) United Kurseong FC	Jolpaiguri	2022

== Winners and finalists ==
Year	Winners	Score	Runners-up	Ref.
2022	FC Uttor Bongo		United Sikkim FC	
