= Bashundhara Kings Women =

Bangladeshi association football club

- Full name: Bashundhara Kings Women
- Nickname: The Kings
- Founded: 2019; 7 years ago
- Ground: Bir Sherestha Shaheed Shipahi Mostafa Kamal Stadium
- Capacity: 25,000
- Owner: Bashundhara Group
- President: Imrul Hassan
- Head coach: Abu Ahmed Faysal
- League: Bangladesh Women's Football League
- 2021–22: Champions
- Website: http://www.bashundharakings.com/
Home colours	Away colours

Bashundhara Kings Women (Bengali: বসুন্ধরা কিংস নারী দল) is a Bangladeshi women's professional football club affiliated with Bashundhara Kings. The club last played in the Bangladesh Women's Football League.

== History ==
=== Inception ===
On 7 September 2019, the club officially announced the former national player Mahmuda Sharifa Oditi as their women's coach. In October 2019, Bashundhara Kings informed the Bangladesh Football Federation that they want to participate in the women's league.

=== 2019–20 season ===
Bashundhara Kings formed a strong team for the 3rd edition of the Women's Football League, including 19 national players. On 22 February 2020, Bashundhara Kings officially introduced their star-studded squad. On 1 March, Bashundhar when the title-contenders handed a 13–0 defeat on Spartan MK Gallactico Sylhet FC. On 5 March 2020, Sabina netted her third hat-trick in a row to guide Bashundhara Kings to their third consecutive victory with a 9–0 win over Nasrin Sporting Academy. Tohura and Krishna scored two while Sanjida and Munni scored one goal each for the winners. On 7 November, Kings resumed from where they had left off before the COVID-19 pandemic as they thrashed FC Uttar Bongo by 7–0. On 6 December, Kings continued their utter dominance in the domestic football arena by clinching the Women's Football League with a match to spare.

== Shirt sponsors ==
Period	Shirt sponsor
2020 – 2022	Bashundhara Group

== Players (2022) ==
Note: Flags indicate national team as defined under FIFA eligibility rules; some limited exceptions apply. Players may hold more than one non-FIFA nationality.

No.	Pos.	Nation	Player
1	GK	BAN	Rupna Chakma
2	DF	BAN	Sheuli Azim
3	DF	BAN	Shamsunnahar
4	DF	BAN	Mossammat Nargis Khatun
5	DF	BAN	Masura Parvin (3rd captain)
6	MF	BAN	Monika Chakma
7	FW	BAN	Sanjida Akhter
8	MF	BAN	Mishrat Jahan Moushumi (vice-captain)
9	FW	BAN	Tohura Khatun
10	FW	BAN	Krishna Rani Sarkar
11	FW	BAN	Sabina Khatun (captain)
12	DF	BAN	Anai Mogini
13	DF	BAN	Nilufa Yesmin Nila
15	MF	BAN	Maria Manda

No.	Pos.	Nation	Player
17	MF	BAN	Nabiran Khatun
18	DF	BAN	Akhi Khatun
19	MF	BAN	Ritu Porna Chakma
20	FW	BAN	Shamsunnahar Jr.
22	GK	BAN	Yasmin Akhter Joba
24	MF	BAN	Amy Akter
26	FW	BAN	Anuching Mogini
27	FW	BAN	Sirat Jahan Shopna
28	FW	BAN	Nasrin Akter
29	FW	BAN	Marzia
32	GK	BAN	Etie Rani
36	GK	BAN	Mimi Akter
77	MF	BAN	Matsushima Sumaya

== Competitive record ==
As of 30 December 2022

Season	Division	League								League top scorer(s)	
Season	Division	P	W	D	L	GF	GA	Pts	Position	Players	Goals
2019–20	BWFL	12	12	0	0	119	0	36	1	(Bangladesh) Sabina Khatun	35
2020–21	BWFL	14	14	0	0	123	1	42	1	(Bangladesh) Krishna Rani Sarkar	28
2021–22	BWFL	11	11	0	0	100	1	33	1	(Bangladesh) Sabina Khatun	19

== Coaching staff ==
Position	Staff
Team manager	(Bangladesh) Umme Bakhtiar Sanowar
Head coach	(Bangladesh) Abu Ahmed Faysal
Assistant coach	(Bangladesh) Mahmuda Khatun
Goalkeeping coach	(Bangladesh) Mohammad Salim Miah
Physio	(Bangladesh) Laizu Yeasmin Lipa
Kitman	(Bangladesh) SM Wasimuzzaman

Last updated: 5 November 2022

== Team records ==
=== Head coach's record ===
As of 31 December 2022

Head coach	From	To	P	W	D	L	GF	GA	%W
(Bangladesh) Mahmuda Sharifa Oditi	September 2019	December 2020	12	12	0	0	119	3	100.00
(Bangladesh) Abu Ahmed Faysal	March 2021	October 2022	14	14	0	0	123	1	100.00
(Bangladesh) Syed Golam Jilani	November 2022	Present	11	11	0	0	100	1	100.00

=== Top scorers ===
As of 31 December 2022

Season	Player	Goals
2019–20	(Bangladesh) Sabina Khatun	35
2020–21	(Bangladesh) Krishna Rani Sarkar	28
2021–22	(Bangladesh) Sabina Khatun	19

== Honours ==
=== League ===
- Bangladesh Women's Football League
  - Winners (3): 2019–20, 2020–21, 2021–22
