= 2025–26 Men's Futsal League Bangladesh =

Tournament details
- City: 1
- Venue: 1
- Dates: First Leg: 14 – 23 May 2026; Second Leg: 31 July 2026 – 13 September 2026
- Teams: 11

Tournament statistics
- Matches played: 59
- Goals scored: 501 (8.49 per match)

The 2025–26 Men's Futsal League Bangladesh is the inaugural edition of the top-tier men's futsal league in Bangladesh organized by the Bangladesh Football Federation (BFF). The tournament is being played from 14 May. A total of 11 teams participate.

== Venue ==
Venue in Bangladesh
Mirpur, Dhaka
Shaheed Suhrawardy Indoor Stadium
Capacity: 4,123

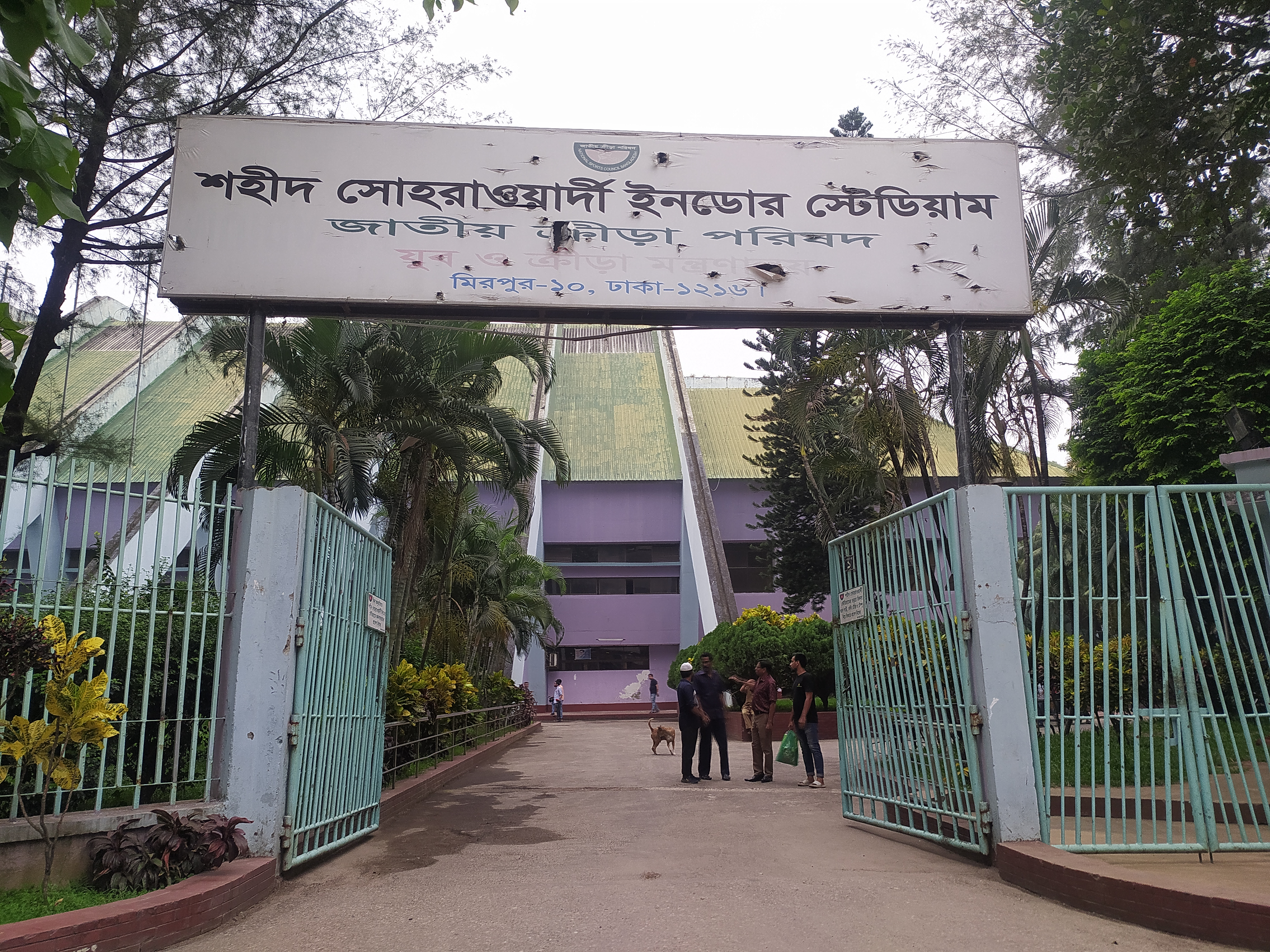
Main entrance of the Shaheed Suhrawardy Indoor Stadium

== Participating teams ==
No.	Team	Appearance	Previous best
1	Ansar & VDP Football Club	1st	—N/a
2	BKSP Football Club	1st	—N/a
3	Dhaka Athletic Club	1st	—N/a
4	IM 10 FC	1st	—N/a
5	Techvill Futsal Club	1st	—N/a
6	Bangladesh Army Sports Club Limited (BASCL)	1st	—N/a
7	Xenon FC	1st	—N/a
8	Chandpur Football Club	1st	—N/a
9	Fakir FC	1st	—N/a
10	Sports Field Logistics	1st	—N/a
11	Warrior Sports Academy	1st	—N/a

== Match officials ==
First referee

- Abul Kalam Rumon (†)

Second referee

- Sobuj Das (†)
- Rofik Hasan (†)
- Alamgir Sarker (†)
- Bikash Sarker (†)
- Anisur Rahman (†)

Assistant referee

- Rofik Hasan (†)
- Shafiqul Islam Emon (†)
- Bayezid Mondol (†)

Fourth official / timekeeper

- Rimon Mahmud (†)
- Jasim Aktar (†)
- Hasnat Zaman (†)
- Ashadul Islam (†)

Match commissioner

- Sujit Banarjee
- Bharat Chandra Gour

(†): Performed as referee & assistant referee.

== Standings ==
Pos	Team	Pld	W	D	L	GF	GA	GD	Pts
1	IM 10 FC	12	10	2	0	76	23	+53	32
2	Fakir FC	13	10	1	2	87	40	+47	31
3	Techvill FC	12	9	1	2	67	27	+40	28
4	Bangladesh Army	11	6	1	4	50	25	+25	19
5	Xenon FC	10	6	0	4	38	33	+5	18
6	Chandpur FC	10	3	2	5	48	50	−2	11
7	BKSP	10	3	2	5	41	50	−9	11
8	Sports Field	10	4	0	6	36	51	−15	12
9	Dhaka AC	10	1	2	7	22	54	−32	5
10	Ansar & VDP	10	1	1	8	21	61	−40	4
11	Warrior Sports	10	0	0	10	17	89	−72	0

Source: BFF

== Matches ==
- All times are local UTC+6.

=== 1st leg ===
14 May 2026
19:00
Match 1

Bangladesh Army Sports Club Limited (BASCL)	6–1	BKSP Football Club
Maruf 16'; Swopon 17'; Sabbir 21'; Atik 23'26"; Jahidul 34'	Report	Raisul 35'

Shaheed Suhrawardy Indoor Stadium, Mirpur, Dhaka
14 May 2026
21:00
Match 2

Xenon FC	3–2	Dhaka Athletic Club
Riaz 10'23"; Sajol 35'	Report	Abdullah 22'29"

Shaheed Suhrawardy Indoor Stadium, Mirpur, Dhaka
15 May 2026
17:00
Match 3

Techvill Futsal Club	8–3	Chandpur Football Club
Mashiur 4', 20'; Masud Rana 6', 23'; Tuhin 16', 19', 29'; Akash 37'	Report	Sohel Rana 14', 30'; Jamal 37'

Shaheed Suhrawardy Indoor Stadium, Mirpur, Dhaka
Referee: Abul Kalam Rumon
15 May 2026
21:00
Match 4

IM 10 FC	7–0	Ansar & VDP Football Club
Moin 7', pen.', 20', 35', 39'; Joy 14'; Srabon 20'; Tazwarz 25'; Touhidul 31'	Report

Shaheed Suhrawardy Indoor Stadium, Mirpur, Dhaka
Referee: Abul Kalam Rumon
16 May 2026
17:00
Match 5

Warrior Sports Academy	4–5	Dhaka Athletic Club
	Report

Shaheed Suhrawardy Indoor Stadium, Mirpur, Dhaka
16 May 2026
21:00
Match 6

Fakir FC	4–3	Xenon FC
	Report

Shaheed Suhrawardy Indoor Stadium, Mirpur, Dhaka
Referee: Sobuj Das
17 May 2026
20:00
Match 7

BKSP Football Club	7–0	Sports Field Logistics
Mohibullah 3'; Nasrullah 27'; Akash 27'; Nahiyan 28'; Raisul 33'; Rahat 35'; Saed 37'	Report

Shaheed Suhrawardy Indoor Stadium, Mirpur, Dhaka
18 May 2026
20:00
Match 8

Bangladesh Army Sports Club Limited (BASCL)	6–3	Ansar & VDP Football Club
	Report

Shaheed Suhrawardy Indoor Stadium, Mirpur, Dhaka
19 May 2026
20:00
Match 9

IM 10 FC	8–2	Chandpur Football Club
	Report

Shaheed Suhrawardy Indoor Stadium, Mirpur, Dhaka
20 May 2026
20:00
Match 10

Techvill Futsal Club	7–0	Warrior Sports Academy
Milon 7'; Foyej 7'; Jewel 16'20"; Masud 31'; Mashiur 32'; Saief 34'	Report

Shaheed Suhrawardy Indoor Stadium, Mirpur, Dhaka
21 May 2026
21:00
Match 11

Fakir FC	10–1	Sports Field Logistics
	Report

Shaheed Suhrawardy Indoor Stadium, Mirpur, Dhaka
Referee: Sabuj Das
22 May 2026
17:00
Match 12

IM 10 FC	6–3	BKSP Football Club
	Report

Shaheed Suhrawardy Indoor Stadium, Mirpur, Dhaka
22 May 2026
21:00
Match 13

Techvill Futsal Club	13–1	Ansar & VDP Football Club
	Report

Shaheed Suhrawardy Indoor Stadium, Mirpur, Dhaka
23 May 2026
17:00
Match 14

Xenon FC	6–1	Warrior Sports Academy
	Report

Shaheed Suhrawardy Indoor Stadium, Mirpur, Dhaka
23 May 2026
21:00
Match 15

Bangladesh Army Sports Club Limited (BASCL)	1–2	Fakir FC
	Report

Shaheed Suhrawardy Indoor Stadium, Mirpur, Dhaka

=== 2nd leg ===
31 July 2026
15:00
Match 1

Fakir FC	12–1	Dhaka Athletic Club
	Report

Shaheed Suhrawardy Indoor Stadium, Mirpur, Dhaka
Referee: Sabuj Das
31 July 2026
19:00
Match 2

IM 10 FC	10–3	Sports Field Logistics
	Report

Shaheed Suhrawardy Indoor Stadium, Mirpur, Dhaka
Referee: Sabuj Das
1 August 2026
17:00
Match 3

Xenon FC	3–1	Ansar & VDP Football Club
	Report

Shaheed Suhrawardy Indoor Stadium, Mirpur, Dhaka
1 August 2026
21:00
Match 4

Bangladesh Army Sports Club Limited (BASCL)	7–1	Warrior Sports Academy
	Report

Shaheed Suhrawardy Indoor Stadium, Mirpur, Dhaka
2 August 2026
17:00
Match 5

Chandpur Football Club	5–3	Dhaka Athletic Club
	Report

Shaheed Suhrawardy Indoor Stadium, Mirpur, Dhaka
2 August 2026
21:00
Match 6

Techvill Futsal Club	11–1	BKSP Football Club
	Report

Shaheed Suhrawardy Indoor Stadium, Mirpur, Dhaka
3 August 2026
16:45
Match 7

Sports Field Logistics	3–4	Xenon FC
	Report

Shaheed Suhrawardy Indoor Stadium, Mirpur, Dhaka
3 August 2026
21:15
Match 8

Fakir FC	14–3	Ansar & VDP Football Club
	Report

Shaheed Suhrawardy Indoor Stadium, Mirpur, Dhaka
4 August 2026
16:45
Match 9

Bangladesh Army Sports Club Limited (BASCL)	3–3	Chandpur Football Club
	Report

Shaheed Suhrawardy Indoor Stadium, Mirpur, Dhaka
4 August 2026
21:15
Match 10

IM10 FC	13–1	Warrior Sports Academy
	Report

Shaheed Suhrawardy Indoor Stadium, Mirpur, Dhaka
5 August 2026
16:45
Match 11

Ansar & VDP Football Club	2–3	BKSP Football Club
	Report

Shaheed Suhrawardy Indoor Stadium, Mirpur, Dhaka
5 August 2026
21:15
Match 12

Techvill Futsal Club	3–2	Xenon FC
	Report

Shaheed Suhrawardy Indoor Stadium, Mirpur, Dhaka
6 August 2026
16:45
Match 13

Bangladesh Army Sports Club Limited (BASCL)	8–4	Sports Field Logistics
	Report

Shaheed Suhrawardy Indoor Stadium, Mirpur, Dhaka
6 August 2026
21:15
Match 14

Dhaka Athletic Club	0–6	IM 10 FC
	Report

Shaheed Suhrawardy Indoor Stadium, Mirpur, Dhaka
9 August 2026
16:45
Match 15

Techvill Futsal Club	6–2	Dhaka Athletic Club
	Report

Shaheed Suhrawardy Indoor Stadium, Mirpur, Dhaka
9 August 2026
21:15
Match 16

Fakir FC	5–3	BKSP Football Club
	Report

Shaheed Suhrawardy Indoor Stadium, Mirpur, Dhaka
10 August 2026
16:45
Match 17

Sports Field Logistics	5–2	Ansar & VDP Football Club
	Report

Shaheed Suhrawardy Indoor Stadium, Mirpur, Dhaka
10 August 2026
21:15
Match 18

Xenon FC	8–1	Chandpur Football Club
	Report

Shaheed Suhrawardy Indoor Stadium, Mirpur, Dhaka
11 August 2026
16:45
Match 19

BKSP Football Club	10–5	Warrior Sports Academy
	Report

Shaheed Suhrawardy Indoor Stadium, Mirpur, Dhaka
11 August 2026
21:15
Match 20

IM 10 FC	2–0	Bangladesh Army Sports Club Limited
	Report

Shaheed Suhrawardy Indoor Stadium, Mirpur, Dhaka
12 August 2026
16:45
Match 21

Sports Field Logistics	6–4	Chandpur Football Club
	Report

Shaheed Suhrawardy Indoor Stadium, Mirpur, Dhaka
12 August 2026
21:15
Match 22

Techvill Futsal Club	2–3	Fakir FC
	Report

Shaheed Suhrawardy Indoor Stadium, Mirpur, Dhaka
13 August 2026
16:45
Match 23

Warrior Sports Academy	1–5	Ansar & VDP Football Club
	Report

Shaheed Suhrawardy Indoor Stadium, Mirpur, Dhaka
13 August 2026
21:15
Match 24

Bangladesh Army Sports Club Limited	7–1	Xenon FC
	Report

Shaheed Suhrawardy Indoor Stadium, Mirpur, Dhaka
14 August 2026
16:45
Match 25

BKSP Football Club	3–3	Dhaka Athletic Club
	Report

Shaheed Suhrawardy Indoor Stadium, Mirpur, Dhaka
14 August 2026
21:15
Match 26

IM 10 FC	3–3	Techvill Futsal Club
	Report

Shaheed Suhrawardy Indoor Stadium, Mirpur, Dhaka
15 August 2026
16:45
Match 27

Ansar & VDP Football Club	0–4	Chandpur Football Club
	Report

Shaheed Suhrawardy Indoor Stadium, Mirpur, Dhaka
15 August 2026
21:15
Match 28

Fakir FC	11–2	Warrior Sports Academy
	Report

Shaheed Suhrawardy Indoor Stadium, Mirpur, Dhaka
16 August 2026
21:15
Match 29

Bangladesh Army Sports Club Limited	8–0	Dhaka Athletic Club
	Report

Shaheed Suhrawardy Indoor Stadium, Mirpur, Dhaka
17 August 2026
16:45
Match 30

Warrior Sports Academy	0–15	Chandpur Football Club
	Report

Shaheed Suhrawardy Indoor Stadium, Mirpur, Dhaka
17 August 2026
21:15
Match 31

Techvill Futsal Club	3–2	Sports Field Logistics
	Report

Shaheed Suhrawardy Indoor Stadium, Mirpur, Dhaka
18 August 2026
21:15
Match 32

IM 10 FC	6–1	Xenon FC
	Report

Shaheed Suhrawardy Indoor Stadium, Mirpur, Dhaka
19 August 2026
16:45
Match 33

Dhaka Athletic Club	1–2	Sports Field Logistics
	Report

Shaheed Suhrawardy Indoor Stadium, Mirpur, Dhaka
19 August 2026
21:15
Match 34

Fakir FC	9–6	Chandpur Football Club
	Report

Shaheed Suhrawardy Indoor Stadium, Mirpur, Dhaka
20 August 2026
16:45
Match 35

BKSP Football Club	5–7	Xenon FC
	Report

Shaheed Suhrawardy Indoor Stadium, Mirpur, Dhaka
20 August 2026
21:15
Match 36

Techvill Futsal Club	4–1	Bangladesh Army Sports Club Limited
	Report

Shaheed Suhrawardy Indoor Stadium, Mirpur, Dhaka
21 August 2026
16:45
Match 37

Warrior Sports Academy	2–10	Sports Field Logistics
	Report

Shaheed Suhrawardy Indoor Stadium, Mirpur, Dhaka
21 August 2026
21:15
Match 38

IM 10 FC	5–5	Fakir FC
	Report

Shaheed Suhrawardy Indoor Stadium, Mirpur, Dhaka
22 August 2026
16:45
Match 39

BKSP Football Club	5–5	Chandpur Football Club
	Report

Shaheed Suhrawardy Indoor Stadium, Mirpur, Dhaka
22 August 2026
21:15
Match 40

Dhaka Athletic Club	5–5	Ansar & VDP Football Club
	Report

Shaheed Suhrawardy Indoor Stadium, Mirpur, Dhaka

== Playoffs ==
9 September 2026
8:30 PM
Match 41 Semifinal 1

Fakir FC	4–8	IM 10 FC
	Report

Shaheed Suhrawardy Indoor Stadium, Mirpur, Dhaka
10 September 2026
8:30 PM
Match 42 Eliminator

Techvill Futsal Club	4–2	Bangladesh Army Sports Club Limited (BASCL)
	Report

Shaheed Suhrawardy Indoor Stadium, Mirpur, Dhaka
11 September 2026
8:30 PM
Match 43 Semifinal 2

Techvill Futsal Club	3–7	Fakir FC
	Report

Shaheed Suhrawardy Indoor Stadium, Mirpur, Dhaka

== Grand Final ==
13 September 2026
8:00 PM
Match 44 Grand Final

IM 10 FC	2–1	Fakir FC
	Report

Shaheed Suhrawardy Indoor Stadium, Mirpur, Dhaka

== Awards ==
Champion	Runner-up	3rd place	4th place
IM 10 FC	Fakir FC	Techvill Futsal Club	Bangladesh Army Sports Club Limited (BASCL)

== Broadcasting ==
Broadcaster	Territory
T Sports	Bangladesh
BFF TV (worldwide)	Bangladesh

== See also ==
- Men's Futsal League Bangladesh
- Women's Futsal League Bangladesh
- 2025–26 Women's Futsal League Bangladesh
