= BSL =

BSL may refer to:

== Businesses ==
- Black Star Line, a former shipping line owned by Marcus Garvey
- BlueScope Steel Limited, Australian-based flat product steel producer
- Bokaro Steel Plant, a steel plant in Bokaro district, Jharkhand, India
- Boyne Smelters Limited, Australian-based aluminium smelter company
- Brookdale Senior Living, a U.S. company that operates senior residences
- Tata Steel BSL, formerly Bhushan Steel Limited, a defunct manufacturer of auto-grade steel in India

== Education ==
- Bachelor of Science in Law, an academic degree
- British School of Lomé, Togo, a school in Togo, West Africa

== Languages ==
- British Sign Language, United Kingdom
- Bhutanese Sign Language, Bhutan
- Brazilian Sign Language, Brazil
- Bulgarian Sign Language, Bulgaria

== Publications ==
- Bulletin de la Société de Linguistique de Paris, a French journal of linguistics (since 1869)
- Bulletin of Symbolic Logic, American journal of the Association for Symbolic Logic (since 1995)
- Transport Phenomena (book), a 1960 chemical engineering textbook by Bird, Stewart, and Lightfoot

== Science and computing ==
- Biosafety level or biohazard safety level, a set of biocontainment precautions
- Blood sugar level
- Boost Software License, a license popular for C++ projects
- Bootstrap loader, the software involved in booting a computer
- Business Source License, a source-available software license

== Sports ==
- Basketball Super League, Turkey
- Basketball Super League (North America)
- Israeli Basketball Super League
- Brunei Super League, a football league
- Bangladesh Super League, a football league

== Transportation ==
- EuroAirport Basel Mulhouse Freiburg (IATA airport code)
- Broad Street Line, a subway line in Philadelphia, Pennsylvania, US
- Bhusaval Junction railway station (station code: BSL), Maharashtra, India

== Other uses ==
- Bangladesh Student League, a students' political organisation in Bangladesh
- Biologic Space Laboratories, the location of the Metroid Fusion video game
- Beam stage loader, a machine that forms part of a longwall mine
- Breed-specific legislation, a type of law to prohibit or restrict the keeping of particular breeds or types of dog
