= Begum Anowara SC =

Bangladeshi Women's Football club

Begum Anowara Sporting Club
- Full name: Begum Anowara Sporting Club
- Short name: BASC
- Founded: July 5, 2005; 20 years ago
- Ground: Various
- President: A. R. Moniruzzaman
- Head coach: Monir
- League: Bangladesh Women's Football League
- 2019–20: BWFL, 5th of 7

Begum Anowara Sporting Club (Bengali: বেগম আনোয়ারা স্পোর্টি ক্লাব) was a Bangladeshi women's football club based in Dhaka that competed in the Bangladesh Women's Football League, the top flight of women's football in Bangladesh.

== History ==
The Begum Anowara Sporting Club was established on 7 February 2020. The club took part in the 2019–20 Bangladesh Women's Football League. They played debut match against Bashundhara Kings Women, getting defeated by 12–0. They finished fifth out of seven in the league.

== Squad (2020) ==
Note: Flags indicate national team as defined under FIFA eligibility rules; some limited exceptions apply. Players may hold more than one non-FIFA nationality.

No.	Pos.	Nation	Player
1	GK	BAN	Mariyam Talukder
2	FW	BAN	Riji Akter (Captain)
3	MF	BAN	Khaleda Akter
4	FW	BAN	Iti Dewan
5	MF	BAN	Shibalika Khan
6	MF	BAN	Mst Sadia Chokdar Akter
7	MF	BAN	Swapna Islam
8	FW	BAN	Kulsom Akter
9	FW	BAN	Elamoni
10	MF	BAN	Kolpona Akter
11	FW	BAN	Hafsa Akter

No.	Pos.	Nation	Player
12	DF	BAN	Piya Mohona
13	DF	BAN	Sumaiya Akter
14	MF	BAN	Hena Akter
15	MF	BAN	Jamila Mitra
16	FW	BAN	Lopa Ganguly
17	MF	BAN	Sathi Akter
18	GK	BAN	Hasina Akter
19	DF	BAN	Aklima Molla
20	FW	BAN	Labiba Akter
26	DF	BAN	Tania Akter
32	GK	BAN	Mitu Sheikh

== BWFL performance by year ==
Years	Played	Won	Draw	Loss	Goals for	Goals against
2019–20	12	4	0	8	13	38
2020–21	Did not participate					
2021–22	Did not participate					
Overall	12	4	0	8	13	38

== Top goalscorers by season ==
As of 8 July 2021

Season	Player	Matches	Goals	Ref
2019–20	(Bangladesh) Riji Akter	12	3	

== Head coach's record ==
As of 19 July 2021

Head coach	From	To	P	W	D	L	GF	GA	%W
(Bangladesh) Monir	23 January 2021	N/A	12	4	0	8	13	38	33.33
