= List of football stadiums in Bangladesh =

The following is a list of football stadiums in Bangladesh. Stadiums with a capacity of 5,000 or more are included.

== Current stadiums ==
#	Image	Stadium	Capacity	City	Home team	Opened
1		M. A. Aziz Stadium	40,000	Chittagong	Chittagong Abahani	1955
2		Faridpur Stadium	30,000	Faridpur		1960
3		Barisal Divisional Stadium	30,000	Barisal		1966
4		Rafiq Uddin Bhuiyan Stadium	25,000	Mymensingh	Bangladesh Police; Chittagong Abahani	1961
5		Sheikh Kamal Stadium	25,000	Nilphamari		1984
6		Mostafa Kamal Stadium	25,000	Kamalapur, Dhaka	Bangladesh Championship League; Dhaka Senior Division League; Dhaka Second Division League; Dhaka Third Division League	2001
7		Tangail Stadium	25,000	Tangail	Tangail Football Team	1998
8		Rangpur Stadium	25,000	Rangpur	Rangpur Football Team	1968
9		National Stadium, Dhaka	22,085	Motijheel, Dhaka	Bangladesh national football team Bangladesh women's national football team	1954
10		Bangladesh Army Stadium	20,000	Dhaka	Bangladesh Army Football Team	1970
11		Saifur Rahman Stadium	20,000	Moulvibazar		2005
12		Shaheed Dhirendranath Datta Stadium	18,000	Comilla	Dhaka Mohamedan; Dhaka Abahani	
13		Jamalpur Stadium	15,000	Jamalpur	Jamalpur Football Team; Jamalpur Jagarani Club	1952
14		Niaz Mohammad Stadium	15,000	Brahmanbaria	FC Brahmanbaria Women	1934
15		Netrakona Stadium	15,000	Netrakona	Netrakona Football Team	
16		Sylhet District Stadium	15,000	Sylhet	Bangladesh national football team	1965
17		Muktijuddho Sriti Stadium	15,000	Rajshahi		1990
18		Madaripur Stadium	14,975	Madaripur	Madaripur Football Team	2013
19		Bashundhara Kings Arena	14,000	Bashundhara, Dhaka	Bashundhara Kings; Fortis FC; Bangladesh national football team	2022
20		Ghaznavi Stadium	12,000	Bhola		1993
21		Shamsul Huda Stadium	12,000	Jessore	Shamsul Huda Football Academy	2000
22		Khulna District Stadium	12,000	Khulna	Khulna Football Team; Khulna Mohammedan	1958
23		Habiganj Jalal Stadium	11,000	Habiganj	Habiganj Football Team	1956–57
24		Kurigram Stadium	10,000	Kurigram	FC Uttar Bongo; FC Uttar Bongo Women; Kurigram Football Team	
25		Bir Fl. Lt. Matiur Rahman Stadium	10,000	Munshiganj	Rahmatganj MFS; Brothers Union	1998
26		Shaheed Bulu Stadium	10,000	Noakhali	NoFeL SC	1973
27		Chinglah Moung Chowdhury Stadium	6,000	Rangamati	Rangamati Football Team; Rangamati Mohammedan	1980
28		Cox's Bazar Stadium	5,000	Cox's Bazar		2013
29		Shaheed Salam Stadium	5,000	Feni		
30		Shaheed Barkat Stadium	5,000	Gazipur	Dhaka Wanderers; Fakirerpool YMC	
31		Shaheed Ahsan Ullah Master Stadium	5,000	Tongi, Gazipur		2013
32		Shaheed Miraj–Tapan Stadium	5,000	Manikganj	Manikganj Football Team	1963
33		Sheikh Fazlul Haque Mani Stadium	5,000	Gopalganj		

== See also ==
- List of Asian stadiums by capacity
- List of association football stadiums by capacity
- List of association football stadiums by country
- Lists of stadiums
