= Saifur Rahman Stadium =

Multi-use stadium in Moulvibazar, Bangladesh

Coordinates: 24°28′23.34″N 91°46′27.58″E

- সাইফুর রহমান স্টেডিয়াম
- Interactive map of Saifur Rahman Stadium
- Former names: Moulvibazar District Stadium
- Location: Moulvibazar, Bangladesh
- Owner: National Sports Council
- Operator: Moulvibazar District Sports Association
- Capacity: 20,000
- Surface: Grass

Construction
- Opened: 2005

Tenant
- Sylhet Division

Moulvibazar District Stadium, also known as Saifur Rahman Stadium (Bengali: সাইফুর রহমান স্টেডিয়াম), is a multi-use stadium in Moulvibazar, Bangladesh. It is currently used mostly for cricket and association football matches and is named after former Finance Minister Saifur Rahman. Horse racing is also a common sport held in the stadium as well. The stadium has the capacity to accommodate 20,000 spectators. It was built in 2001 and opened in 2005. The complex also contains an indoor stadium, gallery, VIP gallery, dressing room, bathroom and a collapsible gate. The indoor stadium, known as Sheikh Russel Indoor Stadium, opened on 21 September 2018 and is predominantly used for kabaddi and badminton.

== See also ==
- List of football stadiums in Bangladesh
- Stadiums in Bangladesh
- Tangail Stadium
