= Women's football in Bangladesh =

- Country: Bangladesh
- Governing body: Bangladesh Football Federation (BFF)
- National team: Women's national team
- Nicknames: Bengal Tigresses (বাংলার বাঘিনী); Red and Green (লাল-সবুজ)
- First played: Bangladesh 0–1 Nepal (Dhaka, Bangladesh; 29 January 2010)
- Clubs: 11 (2025–26 Season)

National competitions
- SAFF Women's Championship

Club competitions
- Bangladesh Women's Football League

International competitions
- AFC Women's Asian Cup; Asian Games; SAFF Women's Club Championship

Women's football in Bangladesh is a growing sport. The Bangladesh Women's Football League is the only domestic football league dedicated to women's football in Bangladesh. The national team has achieved significant sub-continental success, winning the SAFF Women's Championship in both 2022 and 2024, which has helped grow the popularity of women's football.

== History ==
The introduction of women's football in Bangladesh came in 1977, when football coach Sheikh Shaheb Ali arranged a training camp at Viqarunnisa Noon School and College. The camp was arranged for an eventually cancelled exhibition match against a team from West Bengal, India.

Eventually, in 2003, the Bangladesh Football Federation (BFF) formed the BFF XI in preparation for three exhibition matches against West Bengal. Although matches were played in both Dhaka and Jessore, the fixture in Netrokona could not be held due to security threats. In the same year, a women's wing was established within the BFF, with Sirajul Islam Bacchu serving as chairman. In 2004, the first ever women's football tournament was organised by the BFF at the Kamalapur Stadium.

In 2005, the BFF formed the Bangladesh women's national under-17 team and participated in the 2005 AFC U-17 Women's Championship held in Namhae, South Korea under the invitation of the Asian Football Confederation (AFC). The Bangladesh women's national team made their international debut at the 2010 South Asian Games in Dhaka. Eventually, women's football academies were established throughout the country, notably in Dhaka, Rangamati and Rajshahi. The BFF also launched the BFF Elite Female Academy and received a One Star Recognition as part of the AFC Elite Youth Scheme. The Bangamata U-19 Women's International Gold Cup was also established in 2019, as the country's first international women's football tournament.

== Cultural impact ==
Women's football has served as a significant force for social change in Bangladesh, particularly in rural and remote regions. This sport has been challenging traditional gender roles and providing a high platform for women.

=== The Kolsindur phenomenon ===
The village of Kolsindur has played an important role in the development of this sport. Kolsindur is located in Mymensingh District, and in the early 2010s, a group of young girls attended primary school and participated in an inter-school football tournament, even though they had no electricity or proper shoes to play football. This grassroots program has produced more than half of the national team players. For example, Maria Manda and Sanjida Akhter two bright stars of the national team are from Kolsindur. Sociologists and historians of sport frequently refer to the Kolsindur Model as an example of how sports can influence rural development and improve access to school for girls in Bangladesh.

=== National identity and public reception ===
The success of the 2022 South Asia Football Federation Women's Championship has led to a cultural shift by making a new identity for the sport in Bangladesh. When the players returned home to Dhaka, they were met with thousands of fans who welcomed them back to the capital city through an open-street bus parade. This was the first time a sporting team from Bangladesh had received a public celebration in this style.

=== Social hurdles ===
In Bangladesh, sexist people have always opposed women's football. Many players deal with social walls from sexist people of the community related to their clothing and the way they participate as women in an outdoor sport. On October 20, 2003, an exhibition match was scheduled to take place in Netrokona, Bangladesh, but it was cancelled because of security concerns brought on by local leader protests.

The January 29, 2025, women's friendly football match between Rangpur and Joypurhat was cancelled because religious school students and teachers attacked the venue and began violent protests, claiming that football is not Islamic. A similar match in Dinajpur was also cancelled the day before, making the protest the second incident of the week. The Bangladesh Football Federation declared clearly that women have the right to play football and criticised both games.

== National competition ==
A professional national league, a secondary national championship for districts, and a vast grassroots school system make up Bangladesh's women's football competitions.

=== Women's Football League of Bangladesh ===
The top professional competition in the country is the Bangladesh Women's Football League (BWFL). It launched in 2011 and is run by the Bangladesh Football Federation. The league was revived in 2020 following a seven-year break after its second season. Currently, it has eight to twelve clubs, including Nasrin Sporting Club, one of the major sporting clubs. The BWFL champion is able to compete for Bangladesh in both the AFC Women's Champions League and the SAFF Women's Club Championship.

=== National Women's Football Championship ===
District-based and school teams participate in the semi-professional National Women's Football Championship. Teams from Bangladesh's districts and government departments, like the Bangladesh Army and Bangladesh Ansar, play in this competition, compared to the club-based tournament, BWFL. Before the club-based football, this tournament was the top tier in the past, but it is still an important tournament to identify talented players all over the nation.

Grassroots and school competitions

The foundation of the women's game in Bangladesh is built on large-scale youth tournaments:

Bangamata Sheikh Fazilatunnesa Mujib Gold is one of the biggest football competitions for elementary school girls in the world. The Cup was introduced in 2011. Every year, it serves as the main conduit for the national youth academies, involving more than a million students from thousands of schools.

The BFF hosts the Bangamata U-19 International Gold Cup, an invitational competition that gives the country's under-19 and under-20 teams access to elite international games at home.

Inter-School and Inter-College Championships happen between schools and colleges to promote involvement among urban youth. Regional competitions are held in major cities, particularly Dhaka.

Eight teams from various districts across the nation competed in the first women's inter-district football tournament, the Inter-district Women's Football Tournament 2006. The tournament was cancelled after 2007.

The Districts and government institutions competed in the National Women's Championship from 2009–2016, with Citycell sponsoring the first season.

Schools in Dhaka participated in an interschool football competition called the Dhaka Metropolis Women's School Football Championship 2008. The tournament was cancelled after 2010.

== National teams ==
Since 2010, the Bangladesh Football Federation, which is in charge of the national teams, has witnessed a notable increase in both regional influence and international recognition.

Senior National Team: Known as the Bangladeshi women's national football team. They won their first major international trophy at the SAFF Women's Championship in 2022 and successfully defended the title in 2024.

Youth Teams: Bangladesh's Under-20, Under-17, and Under-15 national teams are very active. In the past, these teams have been the most successful in South Asia, frequently winning regional age-level titles and making it to the final stages of the AFC Asian Cup.

BFF Elite Female Academy: The core of the pool of potential players for the national team is formed by the Elite Academy, a program where the best young prospects stay and train every year under professional coaching.

== Notable people ==
Golam Robbani Choton: He served as the head coach of the national football program from 2009 to 2023. Under his guidance, the national team saw significant changes and growth.

Rituporna Chakma: She is the first person in history to receive a prestigious Begum Rokeya Padak as a footballer in 2025.

Maria Manda: The captain of the youth teams that won several regional championships and also a midfield player. According to Prothom Alo, she is a symbol of the Golden Generation of athletes who made the transition from youth dominance to senior global level recognition.

Rupna Chakma: A goalkeeper who won both the 2022 and 2024 SAFF Women's Championships, being the "best goalkeeper".
