= 2019–20 Bangladesh Women's Football League =

3rd season of the Bangladesh Women's Football League

Bangladesh Women's Football League
- Season: 2019–20
- Dates: 22 February 2020 – 13 December 2020
- Champions: Bashundhara Kings
- Matches: 42
- Goals: 259 (6.17 per match)
- Best player: (Bangladesh) Tohura Khatun (Bashundhara Kings)
- Top goalscorer: (Bangladesh) Sabina Khatun (35 goals) (Bashundhara Kings)
- Highest scoring: Bashundhara Kings 15-0 Cumilla United (1 December 2020)
- Longest winning run: Bashundhara Kings (12 Matches)
- Longest unbeaten run: Bashundhara Kings (12 Matches)
- Longest winless run: Cumilla United (10 Matches)

The 2019–20 Bangladesh Women's Football League, also known as the Tricotex Bangladesh Women's Football League 2019–20 due to sponsorship reason, it was the 3rd season of domestic women's club football competition in Bangladesh hosted and organized by Bangladesh Football Federation (BFF). In this edition, seven teams were participated.

The league has begun from 22 February 2020. On 16 March Bangladesh suspended all competition due to the coronavirus pandemic. However, BFF said that the league season will resume in early November.

== Effects of the 2020 coronavirus pandemic ==
On 16 March 2020, All sorts of sports activities in Bangladesh were postponed until 31 March as a precaution to combat the spread of coronavirus in the country, according to a press release issued by the Ministry of Youth and Sports.

Bangladesh Football Federation (BFF) postponed all Bangladesh Premier League and Women's Football League matches until 31 March.

In August 2020, BFF's women's football committee chairman Mahfuza Akter Kiron stated that the postponed season of Bangladesh Women's Football League will resume in the first week of November. They also asked the clubs to start preparation through letters.

== Venue ==
All matches were held at the BSSS Mostafa Kamal Stadium in Dhaka, Bangladesh.

Dhaka	2019–20 Bangladesh Women's Football League is located in Bangladesh
BSSS Mostafa Kamal Stadium	2019–20 Bangladesh Women's Football League is located in Bangladesh
Capacity: 25,000	2019–20 Bangladesh Women's Football League is located in Bangladesh

== Teams ==
=== Clubs and locations ===
Seven teams participated in the league. Former champions Abahani Limited Dhaka not participating in this edition. Every team will play for first time in the league. Begum Anowara SC first time participate of women football league. Bashundhara Kings is the only team from men's premier league to participate. Sheikh Jamal Dhanmondi Club & Sheikh Russel KC were about to participate but withdrew their name just before the transfer window ends while Cumilla United & MK Gallactico Sylhet confirmed their participation lately.

Locations of the 2019–20 Bangladesh Women's Football League teams

Team	Location
Begum Anowara SC	Dhaka
Bashundhara Kings	Dhaka
FC Uttar Bongo	Nilphamari
Nasrin Sporting Academy	Dhaka
Cumilla United	Comilla
Jamalpur Kacharipara Akadas	Jamalpur
Spartan MK Gallactico Sylhet FC	Sylhet

=== Personnel and sponsoring ===
Team	Head coach	Captain	Shirt sponsor
Begum Anowara SC	(Bangladesh) UnKnown/Vola	(Bangladesh) Kolpona Akter	Begum Anowara SC Authority
Bashundhara Kings	(Bangladesh) Mahmuda Khatun	(Bangladesh) Sabina Khatun	Bashundhara Group
FC Uttar Bongo	(Bangladesh) Milon Khan	(Bangladesh) Israt Jahan Ratna	Rongdhanu Group
Nasrin Sporting Academy	(Bangladesh) MD Didarul Alam Dipu		
Cumilla United	(Bangladesh) Nazrul Islam Belal	(Bangladesh) Rumki	
Jamalpur Kacharipara Akadas	(Bangladesh) Asia khatun Bithi	(Bangladesh) Sadia Akhter	
MK Gallactico Sylhet	(Bangladesh) Liakot Ali		

== League table ==
Pos	Team	Pld	W	D	L	GF	GA	GD	Pts	Qualification
1	Bashundhara Kings (C)	12	12	0	0	119	0	+119	36	Champion
2	Nasrin Sporting Academy	12	10	0	2	53	15	+38	30	Runner-up
3	Jamalpur Kacharipara Akadas	12	6	1	5	30	39	−9	19	
4	FC Uttar Bongo	12	5	1	6	27	40	−13	16	
5	Begum Anowara SC	12	4	0	8	13	38	−25	12	
6	MK Gallactico Sylhet	12	2	1	9	9	61	−52	7	
7	Cumilla United	12	1	1	10	8	63	−55	4	

Source: SofaScore
(C) Champions

== Goalscorers ==
- 35 goals
  - (Bangladesh) Sabina Khatun (Bashundhara Kings)
- 22 goals
  - (Bangladesh) Krishna Rani Sarkar (Bashundhara Kings)
- 16 goals
  - (Bangladesh) Tohura Khatun (Bashundhara Kings)
- 14 goals
  - (Bangladesh) Sapna Rani (Nasrin Sporting Academy)
- 11 goals
  - (Bangladesh) Mosamat Sultana (FC Uttar Bongo)
- 10 goals
  - (Bangladesh) Sheuli Azim (Bashundhara Kings)
- 7 goals
  - (Bangladesh) Sadia (Jamalpur Kacharipara Akadas)
  - (Bangladesh) Tonima Bishwas (FC Uttar Bongo)
  - (Bangladesh) Aklima Khatun (Nasrin Sporting Academy)
  - (Bangladesh) Jannat Islam Rumi (Jamalpur Kacharipara Akadas)
- 6 goals
  - (Bangladesh) Ritu Porna Chakma (Nasrin Sporting Academy)
- 5 goals
  - (Bangladesh) Shohagi Kisku (Nasrin Sporting Academy)
  - (Bangladesh) Mst Nargis Sultana (Bashundhara Kings)
  - (Bangladesh) Maria Manda (Bashundhara Kings)
  - (Bangladesh) Monika Chakma (Bashundhara Kings)
- 4 goals
  - (Bangladesh) Noushin Jahan (Nasrin Sporting Academy)
  - (Bangladesh) Mishrat Jahan Moushumi (Bashundhara Kings)
  - (Bangladesh) Anika Akter (Jamalpur Kacharipara Akadas)
- 3 goals
  - (Bangladesh) Razia Khatun (Nasrin Sporting Academy)
  - (Bangladesh) Roksana ( MK Gallactico Sylhet FC)
  - (Bangladesh) Sanjida Akhter (Bashundhara Kings)
  - (Bangladesh) Unnoti Khatun (Nasrin Sporting Academy)
  - (Bangladesh) Munni (Bashundhara Kings)
  - (Bangladesh) Mst Rekha Aktar (FC Uttar Bongo)
  - (Bangladesh) Ashamoni (Cumilla United)
  - (Bangladesh) Kursia Jannat (Jamalpur Kacharipara Akadas)
  - (Bangladesh) Akhi Khatun (Bashundhara Kings)
  - (Bangladesh) Aasha (Jamalpur Kacharipara Akadas)
  - (Bangladesh) Selina Khatun (Anoara Sporting Club)
  - (Bangladesh) Anuching Mogini (Nasrin Sporting Academy)
- 2 goals
  - (Bangladesh) Nowshan (Nasrin Sporting Academy)
  - (Bangladesh) Sajeda Khatun (Nasrin Sporting Academy)
  - (Bangladesh) Elamoni (Anwara Sporting Club)
  - (Bangladesh) Swapna Islam (Anwara Sporting Club)
  - (Bangladesh) Bipasha ( MK Gallactico Sylhet FC)
  - (Bangladesh) Mosammat Taneya (Jamalpur Kacharipara Akadas)
  - (Bangladesh) Sadia (Anwara Sporting Club)
  - (Bangladesh) Rita (FC Uttar Bongo)
  - (Bangladesh) Borna ( MK Gallactico Sylhet FC)
  - (Bangladesh) Mosammat Sirat Jahan Shopna (Bashundhara Kings)
  - (Bangladesh) Thuinue (Cumilla United)
  - (Bangladesh) Marzia (Nasrin Sporting Academy)
- 1 goal
  - (Bangladesh) Malonee Chakma (FC Uttar Bongo)
  - (Bangladesh) Rehena (Nasrin Sporting Academy)
  - (Bangladesh) Masuda (Cumilla United)
  - (Bangladesh) Chowa Khatun (Jamalpur Kacharipara Akadas)
  - (Bangladesh) Rupa Akter (Bashundhara Kings)
  - (Bangladesh) Subarna (Jamalpur Kacharipara Akadas)
  - (Bangladesh) Shirina (Jamalpur Kacharipara Akadas)
  - (Bangladesh) Anika Tanjum (Jamalpur Kacharipara Akadas)
  - (Bangladesh) Nahar (Cumilla United)
  - (Bangladesh) Anai (Nasrin Sporting Academy)
  - (Bangladesh) Shibalika (Anoara Sporting Club)
  - (Bangladesh) Moni ( MK Gallactico Sylhet FC)
  - (Bangladesh) Kiting (Cumilla United)
  - (Bangladesh) Iti (Anoara Sporting Club)
  - (Bangladesh) Masura (Bashundhara Kings)
  - (Bangladesh) Shamsunnahar (Bashundhara Kings)
  - (Bangladesh) Nusrat Jahan (FC Uttar Bongo)
  - (Bangladesh) Salma Akter (MK Gallactico Sylhet FC)
  - (Bangladesh) Sapna Akter (Anoara Sporting Club)
  - (Bangladesh) Kolpona Akter (Anoara Sporting Club)
  - (Bangladesh) TBC (FC Uttar Bongo)
  - (Bangladesh) TBC (FC Uttar Bongo)
- 1 own goal
  - (Bangladesh) Mukta Das (playing against Bashundhara Kings)
  - (Bangladesh) Unnoti (playing against Bashundhara Kings)
