= Madaripur Stadium =

Multi-purpose stadium located at Madaripur, Bangladesh

Coordinates: 23°10′08.17″N 90°11′56.71″E

- Interactive map of Madaripur Stadium
- Location: Madaripur, Bangladesh
- Owner: National Sports Council
- Operator: National Sports Council
- Capacity: 14,975
- Surface: Grass

Tenants
- Madaripur Cricket Team; Madaripur Football Team

Madaripur Stadium is located by the Madaripur Public Institution, Madaripur, Bangladesh.

== See also ==
- Stadiums in Bangladesh
- List of football stadiums in Bangladesh
- List of cricket grounds in Bangladesh
