= Faridpur Stadium Killing Field =

Mass grave of the Bangladesh genocide

- ফরিদপুর স্টেডিয়াম বধ্যভূমি
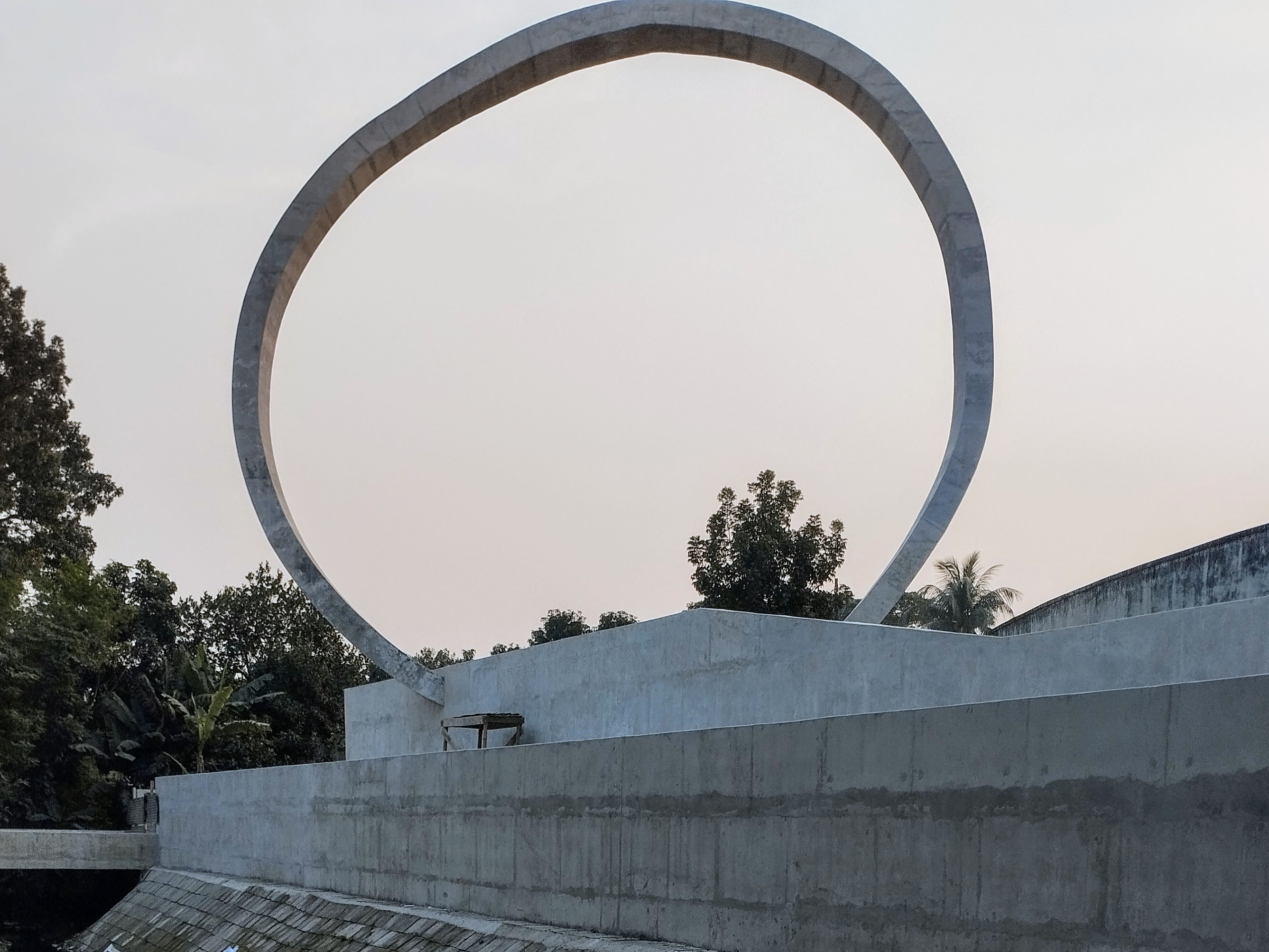
- Interactive map of Faridpur Stadium Killing Field

Details
- Location: Faridpur
- Country: Bangladesh
- Coordinates: 23.604173°N 89.844067°E
- Type: Mass grave

Faridpur Stadium Killing Field (Bengali: ফরিদপুর স্টেডিয়াম বধ্যভূমি) is a mass grave site in Faridpur, Bangladesh, used during the 1971 Bangladesh genocide by the Pakistan Army during the Bangladesh Liberation War.

== Location ==
The killing field is located in the South Kalibari area of Faridpur Municipality, beside the eastern side of the Stadium. To its north lies the Faridpur Judge Court.

== History ==
During the Bangladesh Liberation War, the Pakistani army established a base at Faridpur Stadium. Pro-Independence activists were captured from various parts of the region, detained at the stadium, and later executed. After the executions, the bodies were buried near the pond on the eastern side of the stadium. The exact number of victims remains unknown. A few days after Bangladesh achieved victory in the war, the mass grave site was discovered.

In 1991, freedom fighter and accused in the Agartala Conspiracy Case, Noor Mohammad Babul, identified the location of the mass grave and constructed a small memorial at the site. While digging the ground at the time, human remains including skulls, women's bangles, hair, and skeletons were recovered. Construction of the current memorial began in 2018. Built at a cost of approximately 72.1 million BDT, the memorial complex also includes a lake and two culverts.
