= Women's Futsal League Bangladesh =

- Women's Futsal League Bangladesh 2025-26 official logo
- Organising body: Bangladesh Football Federation (BFF)
- Founded: 2025
- Country: Bangladesh
- Confederation: AFC
- Number of clubs: 11
- Level on pyramid: 1
- Current champions: IM 10 FC
- Website: bff.com.bd
- Current: 2025–26

Women's Futsal League Bangladesh is the premier professional women's futsal competition in Bangladesh. Established in 2025, the league is sanctioned and governed by the Bangladesh Football Federation (BFF). It aims to develop female futsal players for the Bangladesh women's national futsal team, empower female athletes and promote indoor sports.

== Results ==
Ed.	Year	Champions	Runners-up	Third place	Fourth place	No. of clubs
1	2025–26	IM 10 FC	Bangladesh Army	Techvill Futsal Club	BKSP	11

== Overall record ==
Rank	Club	Seasons	Pld	W	D	L	GF	GA	Dif	Pts
1	IM 10 FC	1	12	12	0	0	137	16	+121	36
2	Bangladesh Army	1	13	9	1	3	124	41	+83	28
3	Techvill FC	1	11	8	0	3	68	18	+50	24
4	BKSP	1	10	7	1	2	87	26	+61	22
5	Ansar & VDP	1	10	6	0	4	53	49	+4	18
6	Warrior Sports	1	10	5	0	5	52	50	+2	15
7	Xenon FC	1	10	3	0	7	27	58	−31	9
8	Fakir FC	1	10	3	0	7	31	48	−17	9
9	Chandpur FC	1	10	1	1	8	13	66	−53	4
10	Sports Field	1	10	1	1	8	18	99	−81	4
11	Dhaka AC	1	10	1	0	9	15	154	−139	3

== Participating clubs ==
The following clubs are the founding members of the Women's Futsal League Bangladesh.

No.	Name	Appearance
1	Ansar & VDP FC	1st
2	Bangladesh Army Sports Club Limited (BASCL)	1st
3	BKSP FC	1st
4	Chandpur FC	1st
5	Dhaka Athletic Club	1st
6	Fakir FC	1st
7	IM 10 FC	1st
8	Sports Field Logistics	1st
9	Techvill Futsal Club	1st
10	Warrior Sports Academy	1st
11	Xenon FC	1st

== Awards ==
Edition	Most valuable player	Top scorer(s)	Total goals	Best goalkeeper
2025–26	TBD	Sabina Khatun (33 goals)	642	TBD

== See also ==
- Football in Bangladesh
- Men's Futsal League Bangladesh
- Bangladesh women's national futsal team
