= Netrakona Stadium =

Football stadium located at Netrokona, Bangladesh

Coordinates: 24°53′09.71″N 90°43′25.70″E

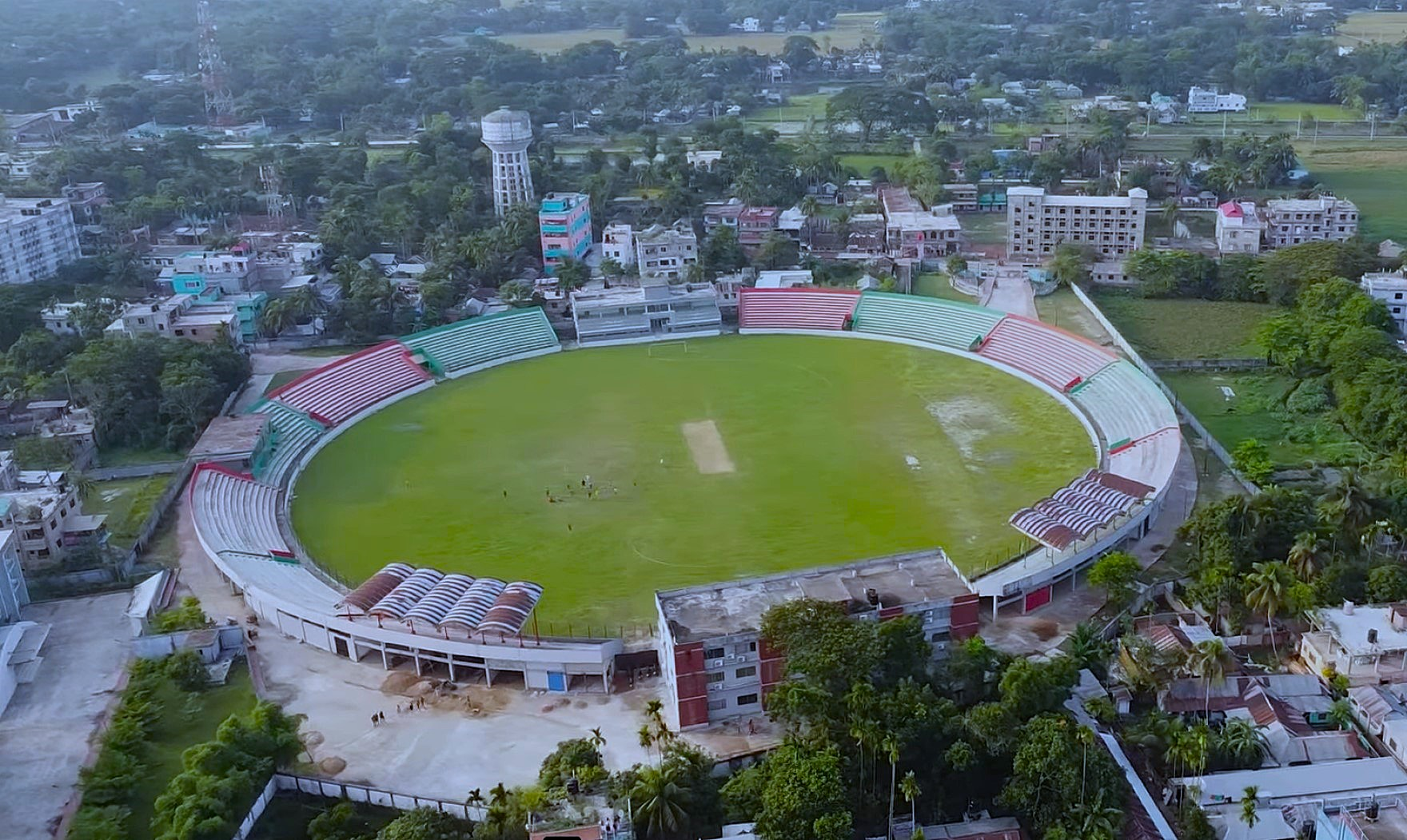
- Interactive map of Netrakona Stadium
- Location: Netrakona, Bangladesh
- Owner: National Sports Council
- Operator: National Sports Council
- Capacity: 15,000
- Surface: Grass

Tenant
- Netrakona Football Team

Netrakona Stadium is a football stadium located by the Alia Madrasha, Netrakona, Bangladesh.

== See also ==
- Stadiums in Bangladesh
- List of football stadiums in Bangladesh
- List of cricket grounds in Bangladesh
