= Ghaznavi Stadium =

Stadium in Bhola, Bangladesh

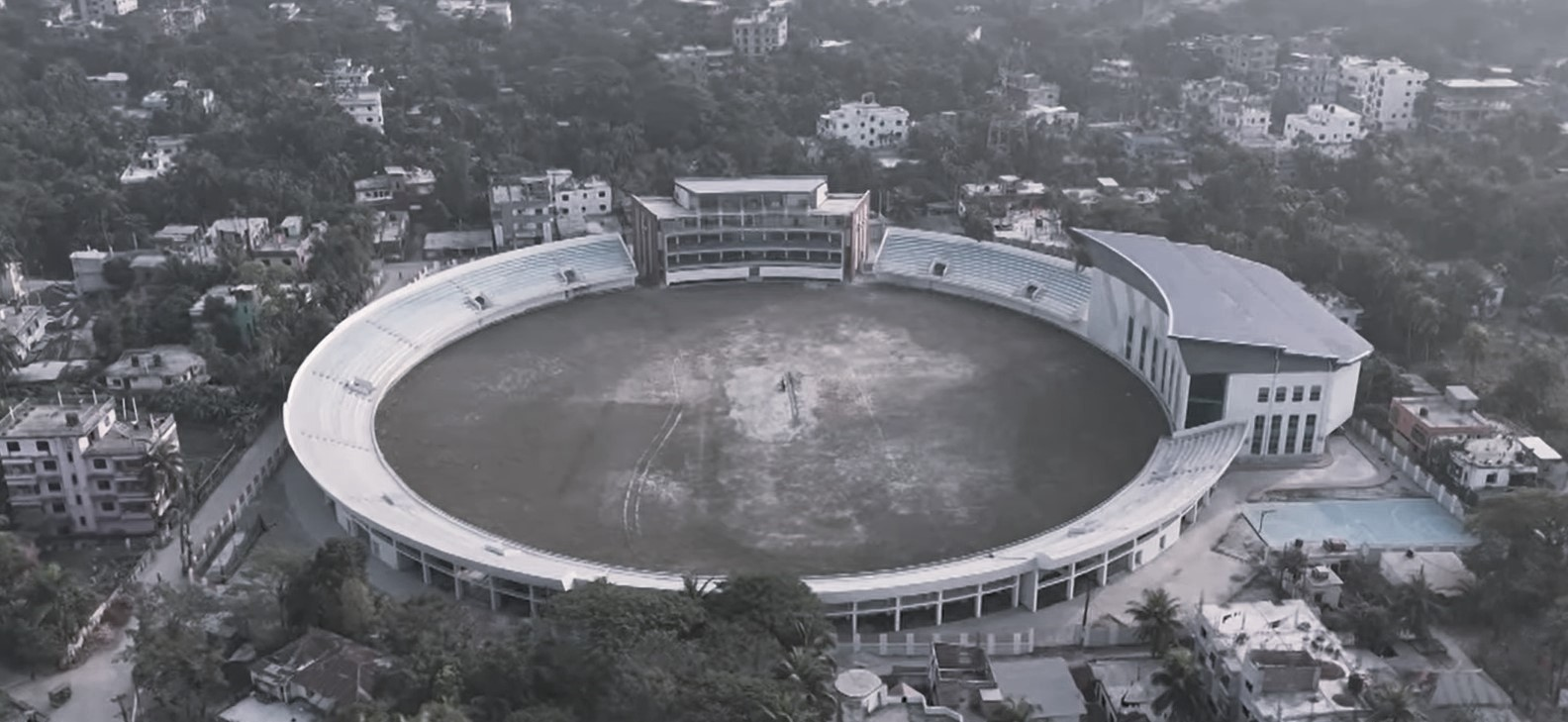
- Interactive map of Ghaznavi Stadium
- Location: Bhola, Bangladesh
- Coordinates: 22°41′25.85″N 90°38′47.58″E
- Owner: National Sports Council
- Operator: National Sports Council
- Capacity: 18,000
- Surface: Grass
- Field shape: Circular

Construction
- Groundbreaking: 1962
- Built: 1992–93
- Renovated: 2025

Ghaznavi Stadium (Bengali: গজনবী স্টেডিয়াম) is a multi-purpose stadium in Bhola, Bangladesh. The field was laid out in 1962 and a proper stadium was built between 1992 and 1993. It is located next to the National Children's Task Force office. Following construction, the stadium was named after Amir Jang Ghaznavi, a renowned footballer from the district.

== Renovation ==
Ghaznavi Stadium underwent renovation between 2021 and 2025 at a cost of Tk 52.39 crore, funded by the National Sports Council and the Ministry of Youth and Sports. The renovation included the addition of modern facilities such as an indoor sports complex, swimming pool, volleyball, basketball and badminton courts, and a gymnasium. Following the renovation, the stadium's seating capacity was increased from 2,000 to 12,000. It was reopned on 4 December 2025.

== See also ==
- Stadiums in Bangladesh
- List of football stadiums in Bangladesh
- List of cricket grounds in Bangladesh
