= Abu Ahmed Faysal =

Bangladeshi footballer and coach

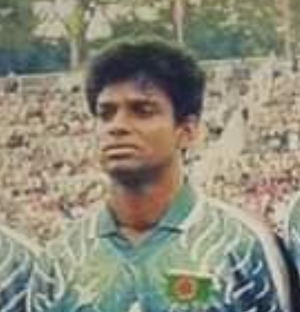
- Faysal with Bangladesh at the 1999 SA Games

Personal information
- Full name: Abu Ahmed Faysal
- Date of birth: 11 June 1972 (age 54)
- Place of birth: Dhaka, Bangladesh
- Height: 1.73 m (5 ft 8 in)
- Positions: Right-back; center-back

Senior career*
Years	Team	Apps	(Gls)
1990–1993	Muktijoddha Sangsad		
1993–1997	Arambagh KS		
1997–2002	Mohammedan SC		
2002–2003	Rahmatganj MFS		
2003–2005	Mohammedan SC		
2005–2010	Farashganj SC		

International career
1999–2006	Bangladesh	16	(1)

Managerial career
- 2015: Farashganj SC
- 2018–2022: Bashundhara Kings (assistant)
- 2021–2022: Bashundhara Kings Women
- 2022: Khilgaon FA
- 2024: Basabo TS
Medal record
Representing Bangladesh
Men's football
South Asian Games
Gold medal – first place	1999 Kathmandu
SAFF Championship
Runner-up	2005 Pakistan
- * Club domestic league appearances and goals

Abu Ahmed Faysal (Bengali: আবু আহমেদ ফয়সাল; born 11 June 1972) is a Bangladeshi football coach and former national player who last served as the head coach of Dhaka Senior Division League club Basabo Tarun Sangha. He was previously the head coach of Bashundhara Kings Women.

== Career statistics ==
=== International ===
Appearances and goals by national team and year
National team	Year	Apps	Goals
Bangladesh
Bangladesh	1999	5	1
Bangladesh	2000	4	0
Bangladesh	2001	5	0
Bangladesh	2006	2	0
Bangladesh	Total	16	1

Scores and results list Bangladesh's goal tally first

List of international goals scored by Abu Ahmed Faysal
#	Date	Venue	Opponent	Score	Result	Competition
1.	25 November 1999	Tahnoun bin Mohammed Stadium, UAE	Sri Lanka	3–1	3–1	2000 AFC Asian Cup qualification

== Honours ==
=== Player ===
Mohammedan SC

- Dhaka Premier Division League: 1999
- National League: 2001–02

Bangladesh

- South Asian Games Gold medal: 1999

=== Manager ===
Bashundhara Kings Women

- Bangladesh Women's League: 2021–22
