= Shaheed Bulu Stadium =

Stadium in Noakhali, Bangladesh

Shaheed Bhulu Stadium
- Interactive map of Shaheed Bhulu Stadium
- Location: Chowmuhuni-Maijdee Road, Noakhali, Bangladesh
- Owner: National Sports Council
- Operator: Noakhali District Sports Association
- Capacity: 10,000
- Surface: Grass

Construction
- Opened: 1973; 53 years ago

Tenants
- NoFeL Sporting Club; Team BJMC

Shaheed Bhulu Stadium (Bengali: শহীদ ভুলু স্টেডিয়াম) is the district stadium of Noakhali, Bangladesh. The Stadium is situated near College Gate in Noakhali municipality.It is the home ground of Bangladesh Premier League team Noakhali Express, Stadium is used for national parade, professional and district level football and cricket leagues,This is the 15th venue used for Bangladesh Football League (BFL) matches.

== Hosting National Sporting Event ==
The venue was the zonal host of 3rd round of National Football League from June 18–29 in 2003

== Cricket ==
During the 2000–01 season, the venue hosted one First-class and one List A match, serving as one of the home venues for Chattogram Division.

== Current status ==
This is as the home ground for NoFeL Sporting Club and Team BJMC, the football team which plays in the Bangladesh Football Premier League 2018–2019.

== See also ==
- Stadiums in Bangladesh
- Tangail Stadium
- List of football stadiums in Bangladesh
- List of cricket grounds in Bangladesh
