= Paul Smalley =

English footballer and manager

Personal information
- Full name: Paul Thomas Smalley
- Date of birth: 17 November 1966 (age 59)
- Place of birth: Nottingham, England
- Height: 5 ft 11 in (1.80 m)
- Position: Right back

Youth career
- Notts County

Senior career*
Years	Team	Apps	(Gls)
1984–1988	Notts County	118	(0)
1988–1990	Scunthorpe United	86	(1)
1990	→ Blackpool (loan)	6	(0)
1990–1991	Leeds United	0	(0)
1991	Doncaster Rovers	14	(0)
- Sutton Town
1992–1996	Hucknall Town		
- Shepshed Dynamo

Managerial career
- 2019–2020: Brunei
- 2022: Bangladesh U20
- * Club domestic league appearances and goals

Paul Thomas Smalley (born 17 November 1966) is an English former footballer and coach. He is currently the technical director of Football Association of Maldives.

== Club career ==
Born in Nottingham, Smalley began his career in the academy of hometown club Notts County. Over the course of four years, Smalley made 118 Football League appearances for the club, before leaving to sign for Scunthorpe United in 1988, scoring one goal in 86 league games. In 1990, Smalley signed for Leeds United, however failed to make an appearance for the club, signing for Doncaster Rovers in 1991, making 14 league appearances. Following his time at Doncaster, Smalley dropped into Non-League football, playing for Sutton Town, Hucknall Town and Shepshed Dynamo.

== Coaching career ==
Following his retirement, Smalley entered coaching, becoming a coach and regional director for The Football Association. In 2002, Smalley was appointed technical director for New Zealand Football. In 2008, after a stint in the United States, Smalley was named director of youth at Portsmouth. Following his spell at Portsmouth, Smalley took up roles in Oceania, working with clubs Northern Fury and Waitakere United, as well as working with the Football Federation Victoria and Football Federation Australia. In 2016, he was appointed technical and strategic director of the Bangladesh Football Federation. In November 2019, Smalley was appointed manager of Brunei. He left his post by mutual consent in May 2020. In July 2020 he was reappointed as the technical director of the Bangladesh Football Federation. Smalley was given the duty of guiding the Bangladesh national under-20 football team during the 2022 SAFF U-20 Championship, while still being the technical director of BFF. In July 2023, he was appointed as the technical director of Football Association of Maldives, following his departure from Bangladesh.
