= Kirtankhola FC =

Association football club based in Barisal, Bangladesh

Kirtankhola কীর্তণখোলা এফসি
- Full name: Kirtankhola Football Club
- Nickname: KFC
- Founded: 2010; 16 years ago
- Ground: Barisal District Stadium
- Capacity: 30,000
- Owner(s): Md Farid Hossain; Md Razzakul Islam
- Chairman: Md Farid Hossain
- Head Coach: Md Monir Hossain
- League: North Bengal International Gold Cup

Kirtankhola Football Club (Bengali: কীর্তণখোলা এফসি) is a Bangladeshi football club based in Barisal. It last competed in the North Bengal International Gold Cup.
