= Rangpur United =

Association football club based in Rangpur, Bangladesh

Rangpur United রংপুর ইউনাইটেড
- Nickname(s): RU
- Founded: 25 April 2015; 10 years ago
- Ground: Rangpur Stadium
- Capacity: 25,000
- Owner: Md Firoz Sarker
- President: Md Rezaul Karim
- Head Coach: Hridoy Dewan
- League: North Bengal International Gold Cup

Rangpur United (Bengali: রংপুর ইউনাইটেড) is a Bangladeshi football club based in Rangpur. It last competed in the North Bengal International Gold Cup.

== History ==
Rangpur United club from Rangpur which was established on 25 April 2015 by Md Reazaul Karim. The club competed in the inaugural edition of the North Bengal International Gold Cup, as well as several district and divisional football leagues.
