= Kurigram Stadium =

Coordinates: 25°48′21.63″N 89°38′20.24″E

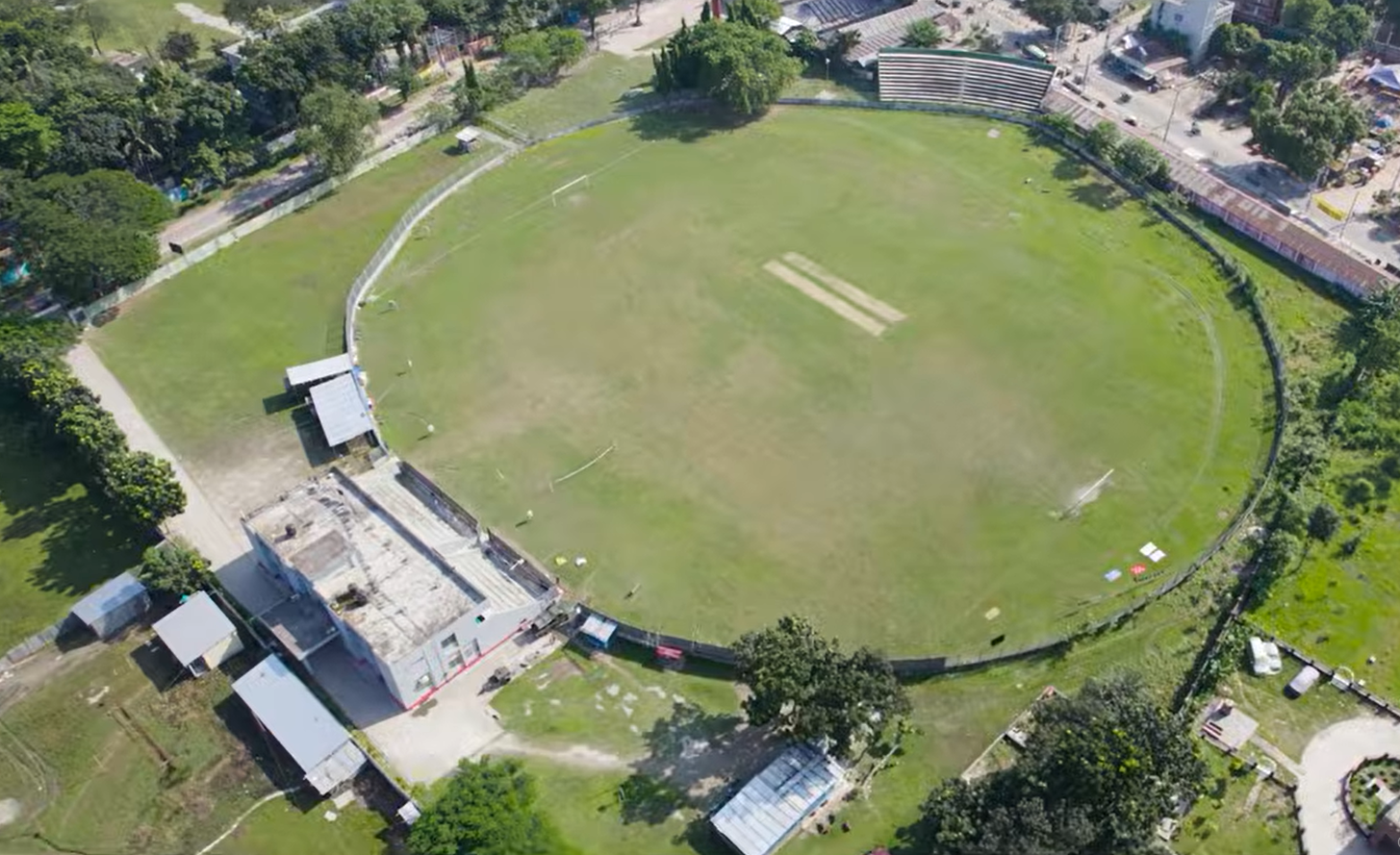
- Interactive map of Kurigram Stadium
- Location: Kurigram, Bangladesh
- Owner: National Sports Council
- Operator: National Sports Council
- Capacity: 10,000
- Surface: Grass

Tenants
- Kurigram Football Team; FC Uttar Bongo; FC Uttar Bongo Women

Kurigram Stadium is located by the Kurigram-Chilmari Rd, Kurigram, Bangladesh.

== See also ==
- Stadiums in Bangladesh
- List of football stadiums in Bangladesh
- List of cricket grounds in Bangladesh
