= Men's Futsal League Bangladesh =

- Men's Futsal League Bangladesh 2025-26 official logo
- Organising body: Bangladesh Football Federation (BFF)
- Founded: 2026
- Country: Bangladesh
- Confederation: AFC
- Number of clubs: 11
- Level on pyramid: 1
- Current champions: IM 10 FC
- Website: bff.com.bd
- Current: 2025–26

The Men's Futsal League Bangladesh is the premier professional men's futsal competition in Bangladesh. Established in 2026, the league is sanctioned by the Bangladesh Football Federation (BFF). It serves as the top-tier domestic futsal tournament, aiming to select players for the Bangladesh national futsal team and kickstart a new era of indoor sports in the country.

== Results ==
Ed.	Year	Champions	Runners-up	Third place	Fourth place	No. of clubs
1	2025–26	IM 10 FC	Fakir FC	Techvill Futsal Club	Bangladesh Army Sports Club Limited (BASCL)	11

== Overall records ==
As of 13 September 2026

Rank	Club	Seasons	Pld	W	D	L	GF	GA	Dif	Pts
1	IM 10 FC	1	12	10	2	0	76	23	+53	32
2	Fakir FC	1	13	10	1	2	87	40	+47	31
3	Techvill FC	1	12	9	1	2	67	27	+40	28
4	Bangladesh Army	1	11	6	1	4	50	25	+25	19
5	Xenon FC	1	10	6	0	4	38	33	+5	18
6	Sports Field	1	10	4	0	6	36	51	−15	12
7	Chandpur FC	1	10	3	2	5	48	50	−2	11
8	BKSP	1	10	3	2	5	41	50	−9	11
9	Dhaka AC	1	10	1	2	7	22	54	−32	5
10	Ansar & VDP	1	10	1	1	8	21	61	−40	4
11	Warrior Sports	1	10	0	0	10	17	89	−72	0

== Participating clubs ==
The following clubs are the founding members of the Men's Futsal League Bangladesh.

No.	Name	Appearance
1	Ansar & VDP FC	1st
2	Bangladesh Army Sports Club Limited (BASCL)	1st
3	BKSP Football Club	1st
4	Chandpur FC	1st
5	Dhaka Athletic Club	1st
6	Fakir FC	1st
7	IM 10 FC	1st
8	Sports Field Logistics	1st
9	Techvill Futsal Club	1st
10	Warrior Sports Academy	1st
11	Xenon FC	1st

== Awards ==
Edition	Most valuable player	Top scorer(s)	Total goals	Best goalkeeper
2025–26	TBD	Moin Ahmed (39 goals)	501	TBD

== See also ==
- Football in Bangladesh
- Women's Futsal League Bangladesh
- Bangladesh national futsal team
- AFC Futsal Club Championship
