= Faridpur Stadium =

Cricket and football stadium in Faridpur, Bangladesh

Sheikh Jamal Stadium
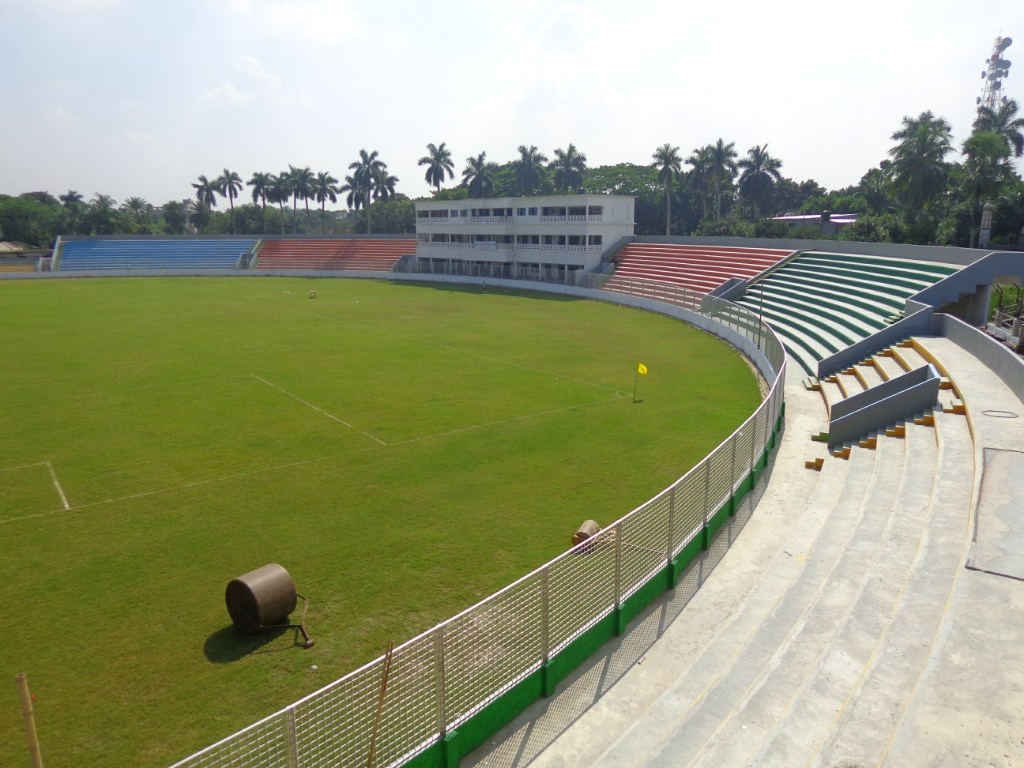
- Interactive map of Sheikh Jamal Stadium
- Location: Faridpur, Bangladesh
- Coordinates: 23°36′16.07″N 89°50′36.15″E
- Owner: National Sports Council
- Operator: National Sports Council
- Capacity: 30,000
- Surface: Grass
- Field size: 145 m x 130 m

Construction
- Opened: 1960

Tenants
- Faridpur Cricket Team; Faridpur Football Team; Sheikh Jamal Dhanmondi Club

Sheikh Jamal Stadium is a cricket and football stadium in Faridpur, Bangladesh. It has hosted first class and list A cricket since 2000.

== See also ==
- Stadiums in Bangladesh
- Faridpur Stadium Killing Field
- List of football stadiums in Bangladesh
- List of cricket grounds in Bangladesh

== First Class Cricket ==
- 8 December 2000: Dhaka Division v Rajshahi Division (2000-01 National Cricket League)
- 20 December: Dhaka Division v Biman Bangladesh Airlines (2000-01 National Cricket League)
- 16 January: Dhaka Division v Barisal Division (2001-02 National Cricket League)

== List A Cricket ==
- 11 December 2000: Dhaka Division v Rajshahi Division (2000-01 National Cricket League One Day)
- 23 December 2000: Dhaka Division v Biman Bangladesh Airlines (2000-01 National Cricket League One Day)
- 18 January 2002: Dhaka Division v Barisal Division (2001-02 National Cricket League One Day)
