= Kobi Jibanananda Das Stadium =

Sports stadium

- কবি জীবনানন্দ দাশ স্টেডিয়াম
- Barisal Cricket Stadium
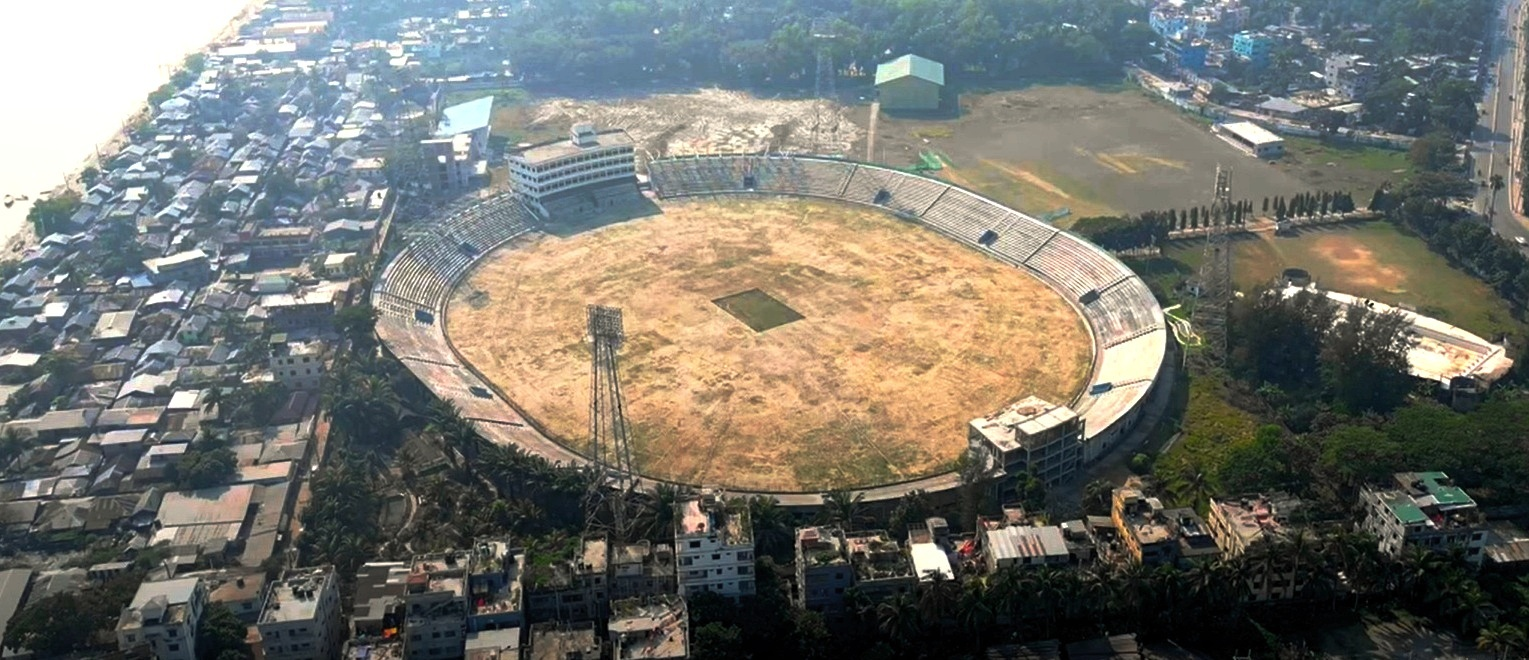
- Interactive map of Kobi Jibanananda Das Stadium
- Location: Barisal, Bangladesh
- Coordinates: 22°41′11.24″N 90°22′5.44″E
- Owner: National Sports Council
- Operator: National Sports Council
- Capacity: 30,000
- Surface: Grass
- Acreage: 29.15

Construction
- Built: 1966

Tenants
- Barisal Division; Fortune Barishal; Kirtankhola FC

Kobi Jibanananda Das Stadium is a multi-purpose district stadium in Barisal, Bangladesh. It is currently used mostly for football and cricket matches. The stadium can hold up to 30,000 people. District and national level cricket and football games are usually organized here. Its area of 29.15 acres, makes it the largest stadium in Bangladesh by size.

== History ==
In 1966, a facility called 'Barisal District Stadium' was started on Band Road in Barisal city for organizing sports events.

In 2006, the venue was developed into a multi-purpose stadium by constructing a gallery for spectators, a five-storey pavilion, and a media center alongside installing floodlights at a cost of ৳23 crore (equivalent to ৳82 crore or US$6.7 million in 2024) and the venue was renamed as Shaheed Abdur Rab Serniabat Stadium. In 2025, The Interim Government renamed the venue as Kobi Jibanananda Das Stadium

The stadium hosted its first youth international cricket match between Bangladesh U-19 and Sri Lanka U-19 on 26 October 2019.

In September 2021, ৳65 crore (US$5.3 million) were granted to renovate the stadium in line with international standards.

== Usage ==
This stadium is most commonly used for playing football and cricket. It is used for The District Gold Cup, Premier League Football, and District Premier League to Third Division Cricket League.

== See also ==
- Stadiums in Bangladesh
- List of football stadiums in Bangladesh
- List of cricket grounds in Bangladesh
- List of international cricket grounds in Bangladesh
