= Nilphamari International Stadium =

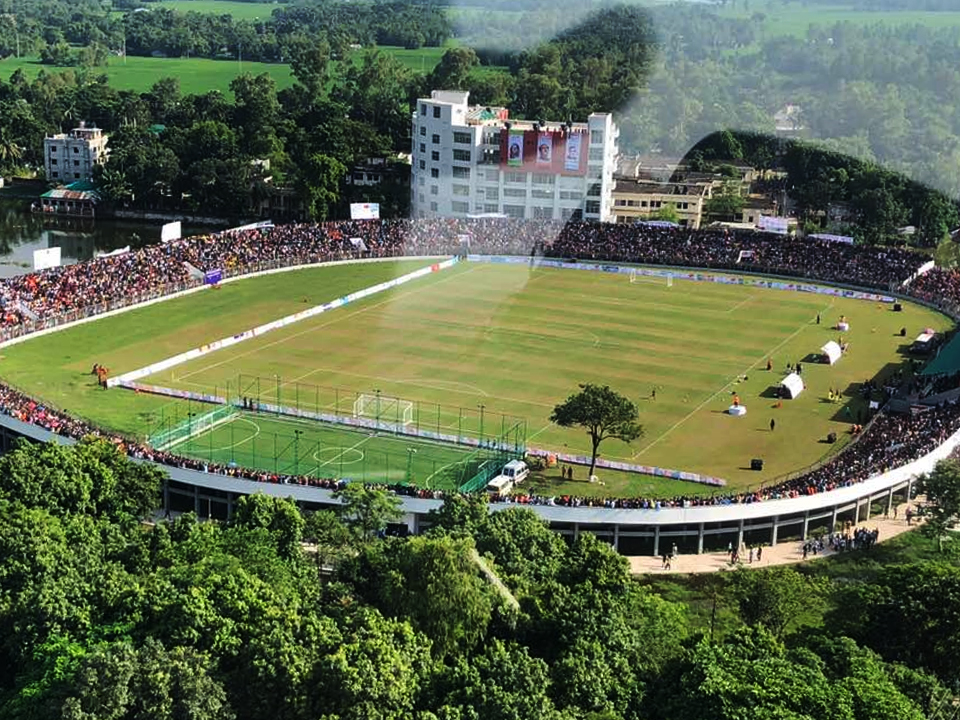
- The crowded stadium on a matchday
- Interactive map of Nilphamari International Stadium
- Former names: Nilphamari District Stadium (1984–2017)
- Location: Nilphamari, Bangladesh
- Coordinates: 25°55′55″N 88°50′44″E
- Owner: National Sports Council
- Operator: District Sports Association, Nilphamari
- Capacity: 20,000
- Record attendance: 21,359
- Field size: 145 × 125 metres (476 × 410 feet)
- Surface: Mini Astro Turf (2018–present); Natural Grass (1984–present)

Tenants
- Bangladesh national football team Bashundhara Kings

Nilphamari International Stadium (Bengali: নীলফামারী আন্তর্জাতিক স্টেডিয়াম) or Nilphamari District Stadium is a multipurpose stadium in Nilphamari, Bangladesh which is mainly used for domestic and international football. It is located on the opposite of Nilphamari Government College and is occasionally used for national day parade and handball games. The stadium, built in 1984, took on a new look after huge renovation works were completed in 2018 with approximately Taka 14 crore being spent on building up nearly 750 square-feet of gallery, a new VIP stand, earth filling, and planting fresh grass among other tasks. The seating capacity of the stadium has been subsequently increased to 20,000. Like other public stadiums, this venue is also owned by National Sports Council (NSC) of Bangladesh, and managed by District Sports Association of Nilphamari. This is the 14th venue used for Bangladesh Premier League (BPL) matches.

== Hosting international events ==
- The Bangladesh national football team played a FIFA international friendly on 29 August 2018 against Sri Lanka national football team in front of a packed stadium. It was the first ever international friendly hosted by this stadium.
- On 21 September 2018, The venue hosted the international club friendly match between Bashundhara Kings and New Radiant SC of Maldives.

== Current status (2018–present) ==
The stadium served as the home ground of Bashundhara Kings, a football team which plays in the Bangladesh Premier League in 2018.

== Attendance record ==
Although the stadium has the capacity for 20,000; but 21,359 tickets were sold for Bangladesh versus Sri Lanka international friendly match. As of 2021 it remains the highest capacity crowd in the stadium's history.

== See also ==
- List of football stadiums in Bangladesh
- Stadiums in Bangladesh
