= Shaheed Suhrawardi Indoor Stadium =

Sports venue in Dhaka, Bangladesh

- শহীদ সোহরাওয়ার্দী ইনডোর স্টেডিয়াম
- Mirpur Indoor Stadium
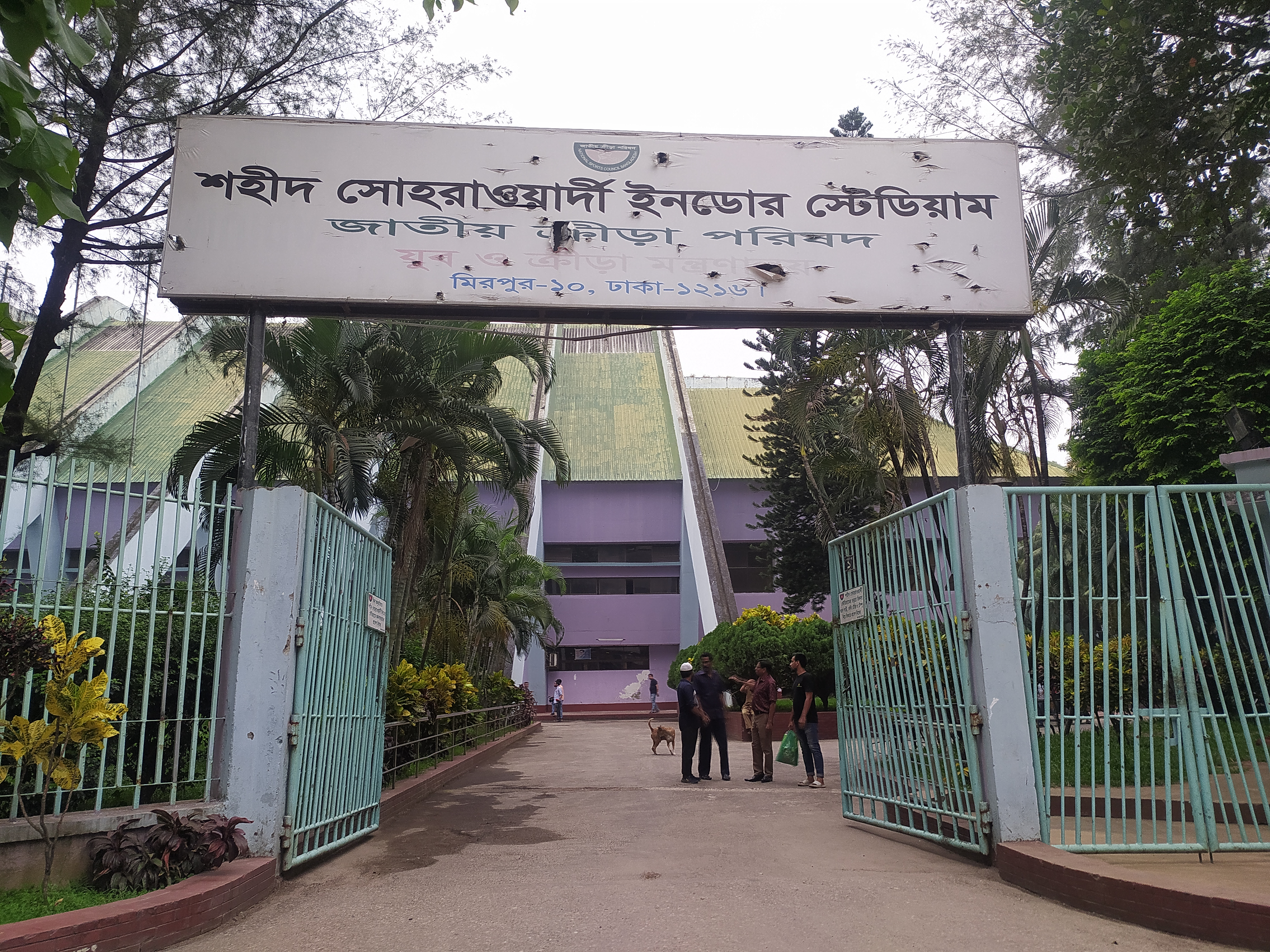
- Interactive map of Shaheed Suhrawardi Indoor Stadium
- Location: Mirpur 10 Roundabout, Mirpur, Dhaka, Bangladesh
- Coordinates: 23°48′41.88″N 90°21′59.27″E
- Owner: National Sports Council
- Operator: National Sports Council
- Capacity: 5,000

Shaheed Suhrawardi Indoor Stadium is an indoor stadium located in Mirpur, Dhaka, the capital of Bangladesh. It is also known as Mirpur Indoor Stadium. Indoor games including volleyball, tennis and martial arts are held in this stadium.

In 2015, 3 lakh taka was allocated for various developments. During the Bangabandhu International Volleyball Tournament in 2016, the stadium suffered some damage.

== See also ==
- List of stadiums in Bangladesh

== Gallery ==
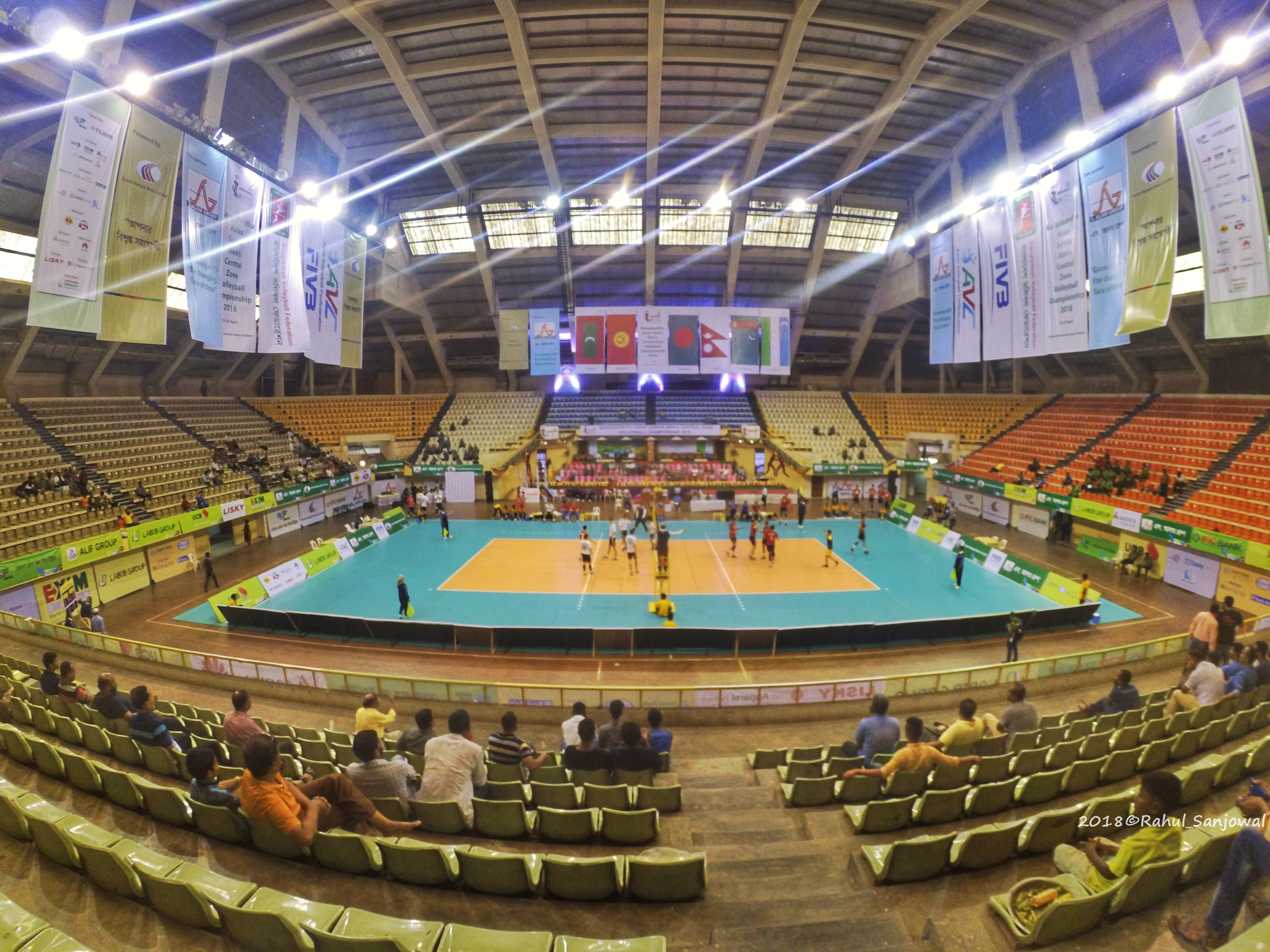
Indoor stadium interior
