= Spartan MK Gallactico Sylhet FC =

Bangladeshi association football club

MK Gallactico Sylhet
- Full name: Spartan MK Gallactico Sylhet FC
- Nickname(s): Sylhet Spartans
- Founded: 2014; 11 years ago
- Ground: Bir Sherestha Shaheed Shipahi Mostafa Kamal Stadium; Dhaka, Bangladesh
- Capacity: 25,000
- President: Nurul Hoque
- Head coach: Liakot Ali
- League: Bangladesh Women's Football League
- b2020: 7 of 8

Spartan MK Gallactico Sylhet FC (Bengali: স্পার্টান এমকে গ্যালাক্টিকো সিলেট এফসি), simply known as MK Gallactico Sylhet, was a Bangladeshi football club based in Sylhet. It was mainly known for its women's team which competed in country's top-tier league Bangladesh Women's Football League. However, they didn't participate in the league after 2019-20 season. It was a Bangladesh-England joint venture club. The club was associated with MK Gallacticos FC, which is situated in Milton Keynes. In January 2020, the academy announced that they will participate in the 2020 Bangladesh Women's League. The women's team name will be 'Spartan MK Gallactico Sylhet FC'. They announced Liakot Ali, an AFC 'A' license holder, as head coach of the women's team.

== Board of directors (2020) ==
Position	Name
President	(Bangladesh) Nurul Hoque
Vice-president	(Bangladesh) Habibur Rahman
General secretary	(Bangladesh) Sohel Ahmed
Director of football	(Bangladesh) Alam Miah
Chief co-ordinator	(Bangladesh) Md Murshed Hossain
