= Tangail Stadium =

Sports venue in Tangail, Bangladesh

Shahid Maruf Stadium
- শহীদ মারুফ স্টেডিয়াম
- Interactive map of Shahid Maruf Stadium
- Former names: Tangail Zilla Stadium
- Location: Club road, Tangail, Bangladesh
- Coordinates: 24°15′11.36″N 89°54′44.74″E
- Owner: National Sports Council
- Operator: National Sports Council
- Capacity: 25,000
- Surface: Grass
- Field size: 185 × 140 m (607 × 459 ft)
- Field shape: Oval

Construction
- Groundbreaking: 1938

Tenants
- Tangail Football Team; Tangail Cricket Team

Shahid Maruf Stadium also called Tangail Zila Stadium (Bengali: শহীদ মারুফ স্টেডিয়াম) is located at Club Road, north side of Bhashani Hall and Tangail Eid-gah, 200 metres away and west side of Shaheed Sriti Poura Uddan in the district of Tangail, Bangladesh. It is a multipurpose stadium. Football, Cricket, concerts and cultural programs take place here. Until 2013 the stadium was the home ground of Team BJMC which played in Bangladesh Premier League Football. It is the 3rd biggest stadium in the Dhaka division.

== Football ==
Different local teams play among each other and it's a venue of inter district football matches. National football also played here from 2014.

== Cricket ==
The stadium is used mostly for cricket, the most popular sport in Bangladesh. The stadium has become a venue of inter district cricket events as well as local events.

== See also ==
- Stadiums in Bangladesh
- List of football stadiums in Bangladesh
- List of cricket grounds in Bangladesh
- Tangail Bus Stand, Mohakhali
- Tangail Railway Station
