= FC Uttar Bongo Women =

Association football club

Uttar Bongo Women
- Full name: Football Club Uttar Bongo Women
- Founded: 2019; 6 years ago
- Ground: Kurigram District Stadium; Kurigram, Bangladesh
- Capacity: 10,000
- President: Jalal Hoissain Laizu
- Head coach: Md. Shohidul Islam
- League: Bangladesh Women's Football League
- 2020: BWFL, 4th of 7

FC Uttar Bongo Women (Bengali: এফসি উত্তরবঙ্গ নারী দল) was a Bangladeshi football club based in Kurigram. It last competed in country's top-tier league, the Bangladesh Women's Football League. They couldn't participate in 2020–21 BFL due to registration issues.

== History ==
Established in 2019, the club announced taking part in the 2020 Bangladesh Women's League. In January 2020, they announced Milon Khan as head coach. They signed nine international players of Bangladesh U-17, Bangladesh U-20 and Bangladesh.

== Squad (2020) ==
Note: Flags indicate national team as defined under FIFA eligibility rules; some limited exceptions apply. Players may hold more than one non-FIFA nationality.

No.	Pos.	Nation	Player
1	GK	BAN	Mayuri Aktar
2	DF	BAN	Runa Akthar
3	DF	BAN	Mowrashi Begum
4	DF	BAN	Joynob Bibi Rita
5	DF	BAN	Rekha Aktar Rima
6	MF	BAN	Rekha Aktar
7	MF	BAN	Mossammat Ishrat Jahan Ratna
8	MF	BAN	Tonima Biswas
9	MF	BAN	Nusrat Jahan Brishti
10	FW	BAN	Nashrin Nahar
11	MF	BAN	Mosamat Sultana

No.	Pos.	Nation	Player
12	MF	BAN	Tonni Bishwas
13	FW	BAN	Airin
14	FW	BAN	Rozina Akhter
15	MF	BAN	Shila Aktar
17	FW	BAN	Molanee Chakma
18	MF	BAN	Bithi Chakma
19	MF	BAN	Soma Akter
20	MF	BAN	Sumaiya
21	MF	BAN	Rubina Akter
23	GK	BAN	Shurovi Aktar
25	GK	BAN	Shammi Aktar

== All-time top scorers ==
Name	Years	Goals
(Bangladesh) Mosammat Sultana	2020	11

== Personnel ==
=== Technical staff (2019) ===
Position	Name
Head coach	(Bangladesh) Md. Milon Miah
Team manager	(Bangladesh) Rupa Hossain
Physio	(Bangladesh) Jameatul Islam Ritika

=== Board of directors (2019) ===
Position	Name
President	(Bangladesh) Jalal Hossain Laizu
General secretary	(Bangladesh) Saidul Abedin Dollar
Chief co-ordinator	(Bangladesh) Manos Das Dholu
Football secretary	(Bangladesh) Rayhan Kobir Nomi Noman
Media manager	(Bangladesh) Ehteshamul Haque Sany
