= Bangladesh Football Federation =

Governing body of association football in Bangladesh

AFC
- Short name: BFF, বাফুফে (Bafufe)
- Founded: 15 July 1972; 54 years ago
- Headquarters: BFF House, 14/B, Toyenbee Circular Road, Dhaka-1000, Bangladesh
- FIFA affiliation: 1976; 50 years ago
- AFC affiliation: 1974; 52 years ago
- SAFF affiliation: 1997; 29 years ago
- President: Tabith Awal
- General Secretary: Imran Hossain Tushar
- Website: bff.com.bd

The Bangladesh Football Federation (Bengali: বাংলাদেশ ফুটবল ফেডারেশন) is the governing body for association football in Bangladesh. Established in 1972 following the country's independence, the federation is responsible for managing the men's national team and women's national teams, as well as the management of domestic professional and amateur competitions, including the Bangladesh Football League.

The BFF became a member of the Asian Football Confederation (AFC) in 1974, and two years later, they became a member of FIFA in 1976. BFF is also a founding member of the South Asian Football Federation (SAFF). Headquartered at the BFF Bhaban in Motijheel, Dhaka, the federation governs all aspects of the sport, from grassroots development to international representation, and is currently led by President Tabith Awal.

== History ==
The Bangladesh Football Federation (BFF) was officially founded on 15 July 1972. Md. Yousuf Ali, the former Minister for Education and Cultural Affairs, established the federation; he also served as its first president. The general secretary under Ali was Abul Hashem of Wari Club. The BFF quickly sought international legitimacy, gaining membership in the Asian Football Confederation (AFC) in 1974, (Note: The Bangladesh Football Federation (BFF) attained provisional membership in the Asian Football Confederation (AFC) in 1973, making them eligible to participate in AFC-administered competitions. Their membership was eventually ratified on 14 September 1974.) and becoming a member of FIFA in 1976. It later became one of the founding members of the South Asian Football Federation (SAFF) in 1997.

Through the FIFA Goal Project, the federation secured the necessary resources to construct a dedicated headquarters. On 10 April 2005, AFC President Mohammed bin Hammam inaugurated the BFF Bhaban, the Federation's FIFA-financed office in Motijheel, Dhaka.

=== International football ===
In 1973, the federation sent the first national team to the Merdeka Cup in Malaysia. In 1978, Dhaka hosted the 1978 AFC Youth Championship, the first major football tournament to take place in the country. In 1980, Bangladesh made its first and only appearance to date in the AFC Asian Cup. The nation's best results came at South Asian level where it won the 2003 SAFF Gold Cup and were gold medalists at the 1999 South Asian Games. Under the federation's management, the Bangladesh women's national team won the SAFF Women's Championship in 2022 and 2024, marking a shift in the federation's focus toward gender inclusivity and grassroots development.

=== Domestic football ===
The BFF immediately took over the Dhaka Football League, which had existed since at least 1911, from the EPSF. In 1993, the federation restructured the domestic football pyramid by creating the Dhaka Premier Division League as the top-tier competition, replacing the old First Division, which in turn became the second-tier. It inaugurated the Independence Cup in 1972, which became the first football competition held after the independence of Bangladesh.

From 1975 to 1982, the BFF operated the Aga Khan Gold Cup, an invitational club cup competition, often regarded as the predecessor of the AFC Champions League. It was shut down following the introduction of the President's Gold Cup in 1981, which was also replaced by the Bangabandhu Cup in 1996.

The BFF launched the Federation Cup in 1980, a knockout club cup tournament that grew to be the country's top national cup competition.

By the early 2000s, the BFF faced growing pressure from AFC to modernize its league structure, which was largely centered around Dhaka clubs. In response to the AFC's Vision Asia initiative, the federation began to change the process of transitioning from a regional amateur setup to a national system. It first introduced the National League in 2000, which, although it functioned outside the domestic league pyramid, granted clubs eligibility to participate in AFC club competitions, a right that the Premier Division clubs of the Dhaka Football League lost following the turn of the century.

The transition concluded in 2007 with the launch of the B. League, currently the Bangladesh Football League, which replaced the old Dhaka-focused league with a professional national competition. In 2012, the BFF launched the second-tier professional national league, the Bangladesh Championship League, which saw the regional Dhaka Football League make up the third, fourth, and fifth tiers of the country's football league pyramid.

In 2009, it launched the Super Cup tournament, with a prize money of Tk1 million. In 2013, the prize money for winning the competition was Tk10 million. In the inaugural competition, Mohammedan SC beat arch-rivals Abahani Limited Dhaka.

== Criticism ==
=== FIFA Suspension (2002) ===
On 26 November 2001, Sultan, a member of the BNP-led coalition government, was appointed as BFF president, replacing AM Azizul Haque, who had been initially elected by the previous Caretaker government. On 20 December 2001, Sultan replaced the elected body of the BFF, which was led by general secretary, Harunur Rashid, with an ad-hoc committee. On 10 January 2002, FIFA banned the BFF for violating FIFA and Asian Football Confederation (AFC) laws that only recognize a democratically elected committee to run a member's football authority. The ban was lifted on 11 February 2002, after the original elected committee was reinstated. Eventually, Rashid resigned, allegedly forced by Sultan, who remained in the president's seat after being unopposed in the 26 April 2003 BFF elections.

=== FIFA sanctions (2023–2024) ===
On 14 April 2023, FIFA issued a two-year ban to the BFF general secretary, Abu Nayeem Shohag. A FIFA report revealed that Shohag had made quotations and unauthorized signatures to facilitate payments for items such as footballs, grass-cutting machinery, and air travel for the national team. He was found guilty of breaching several provisions of the FIFA Code of Ethics, also regarding the duty of loyalty, and general duties.

The investigation was expanded in May 2024, leading to more sanctions against four other high-ranking officials. Former chief financial officer Abu Hossain and Operations Manager Mizanur Rahman each received two-year bans and fines for their involvement in transactions supported by falsified documents. Abdus Salam Murshedy, the senior vice-president and chairman of the finance committee, was also fined for administrative carelessness and failing to provide proper financial reports, while procurement officer Imrul Hasan Sharif received a warning and was ordered to undergo compliance training.

== Executive Committee Board ==
=== Board of directors ===
As of June 2026

Name	Position	Source
(Bangladesh) Tabith Awal	President	
(Bangladesh) Imrul Hasan	Senior Vice-president	
(Bangladesh) Nasser Shahrear	2nd Vice-president	
(Bangladesh) Wahid Happy	3rd Vice-president	
(Bangladesh) Sabbir Ahmed Arif	4th Vice-president	
(Bangladesh) Fahad Karim	5th Vice-president	
(Bangladesh) Imran Hossain Tushar	General Secretary	
(Bangladesh) Saiful Bari	Technical Director	
(United States) Thomas Dooley	Team Coach (Men's)	
(England) Gerard Jones	Head Youth & Development Coach (Men's), U20 Men's Head Coach	
(England) Peter Butler	Team Coach (Women's)	

=== Presidents ===
President	Took office	Left office	Ref
Muhammad Yusuf Ali	1972	1973	
Gazi Golam Mostafa	1973	1976	
Mir Shawkat Ali	1976	1978	
Siddique Ahmed	1978	1980	
Abdur Raquib Khandaker	1980	1986	
Harun Ahmed Chowdhury	1986	1986	
Hafizuddin Ahmed	1986	1989	
Mahmudul Hasan	1989	1992	
Oli Ahmad	1992	1994	
Mohammad Hanif	1996	2001	
AM Azizul Haque	2001	2001	
SA Sultan	2001	2008	
Kazi Salahuddin	2008	2024	
Tabith Awal	2024	Present	

=== Technical director ===
President	Took office	Left office	Ref
Shahidur Rahman	2008	2010	
Bayazid Alam Zubair Nipu	2010	2015	
Paul Smalley	2016	2019	
Stuart Watkiss	2020	2020	
Paul Smalley	2020	2023	
Saiful Bari	2024	Present	

== Competitions ==
=== Men's club competitions ===
As of February 2026

Competitions currently run by BFF:

Competition	First season	Current champion	Remarks
Bangladesh Football League	2007	Mohammedan SC	The country's top-tier football league.
Federation Cup	1980	Bashundhara Kings	The country's top-tier leagues cup competition.
Independence Cup	1972	Bashundhara Kings	The country's national cup competition.
Challenge Cup	2024	Bashundhara Kings	The country's super cup competition.
Bangladesh Championship League	2012	PWD SC	The country's 2nd tier football league.
Senior Division League	2007	Jatrabari KC	The country's 3rd tier football league.
Second Division League	1948	Saif SC Youth Team	The country's 4th tier football league.
Third Division League	1948	Chawkbazar Kings	The country's 5th tier football league.
Pioneer Football League	1981	Barishal Football Academy	The country's 6th tier football league.
BFF U-18 Football Tournament	2014	NoFeL Sporting Club U-18	The country's U-18 club football tournament.
BFF U-18 Football League	2021–22	Sheikh Jamal DC U-18	The country's top tier U-18 football league.
BFF U-16 Football Tournament	2021–22	Kawran Bazar PS U-16	The country's U-16 football tournament.

=== Other competitions ===
As of May 2024

Competitions currently run by BFF:

Competition	First season	Current Champion	Remarks
Bangabandhu Cup	1996–97	Palestine	International football tournament.
Bangamata U-19 Women's International Gold Cup	2019	Bangladesh & Laos	International U-19 Women's football tournament.
Sheikh Kamal International Club Cup	2015	Terengganu F.C.	International clubs football tournament.
Sheikh Russel U-18 Gold Cup	2021–22	Wari Thana	The country's Metropolis Thanas football competition
National Football Championship	1973	Bangladesh Army	District and institutional cup tournament.
Bangladesh Women's Football League	2011	Rajshahi Stars FC	The country's women's professional clubs football league.
Men's Futsal League Bangladesh	2025–26	TBD	The first men's premier professional futsal league in Bangladesh.
Women's Futsal League Bangladesh	2025–26	TBD	The first women's premier professional futsal league in Bangladesh.

=== Defunct ===
As of June 2023

Competitions previously run by BFF:

Competition	First season	Last season	Last Champion	Remarks
Aga Khan Cup	1958	1981–82	Bangkok Bank F.C. and Brothers Union [Shared after 1–1 draw]	Continental club competition last held in 1982.
President's Gold Cup	1981	1993	Petrolul Ploiești	International football tournament.
First Division League	1948	1992	Rahmatganj MFS	1st tier semi-professional football league last held as top level in 1992.
First Division League (second level)	1993	2004–05	Rahmatganj MFS	2nd tier semi-professional football league last held in 2005.
National Football League	2000	2006	Mohammedan SC	The country's first semi-professional national league last held in 2006.
Super Cup	2009	2013	Mohammedan SC	The country's highest budgeted cup football competition.

== Stadiums ==
- National Stadium, Dhaka
- BSSS Mostafa Kamal Stadium, Dhaka
- District Stadium, Chattogram
- Sylhet District Stadium, Sylhet
- Shamsul Huda Stadium' Jessore
- Rajshahi District Stadium, Rajshahi
- Shaheed Kamruzzaman Stadium, Rajshahi
- Gopalganj Old Stadium, Gopalgonj
- Shaheed Salam Stadium, Feni
- Mymensingh Stadium, Mymensingh
- Shaheed Dhirendranath Stadium, Comilla
- Shaheed Bulu Stadium, Noakhali
- Nilphamari International Stadium, Nilphamari
- Bangladesh Army Stadium, Dhaka
- Munshigonj Stadium, Munshiganj
- Shaheed Ahsan Ullah Master Stadium, Gazipur
- Bashundhara Kings Arena, Dhaka

== Official partners ==
Between 2000 and 2005, Nitol–Tata, the sole distributor of Tata vehicles in Bangladesh, served as the primary sponsor of the BFF's national league. In April 2008, the BFF signed a three-year sponsorship agreement with the mobile phone operator Citycell, valued at BDT 165 million (approximately US$2.28 million), which was reported as the largest sponsorship deal in Bangladeshi football at the time.

In 2010, the federation entered into a multi-year agreement with Grameenphone to sponsor several domestic competitions, including the Super Cup. Following the conclusion of that deal, Nitol–Tata returned as sponsor for the 2013–14 season under a one-year agreement valued at US$70,000.

On 20 November 2018, Dhaka Bank signed a football sponsorship deal with the BFF in support of women's football development and age-level programs..

On 13 March 2022, the BFF signed a two-year agreement with the brand Pusti to serve as the federation's official beverage partner.

In early 2025, following the election of Tabith Awal as president, the federation announced plans to expand its commercial partnerships through longer-term agreements. On 15 March 2025, the BFF signed a five-year strategic partnership with United Commercial Bank (UCB), under which UCB became the title sponsor of the Bangladesh national football team.

After a four-year absence of an official kit supplier, the BFF signed a two-year agreement with DOUR Sportswear on 11 February 2025. In May 2025, the Japan-based Molten Corporation became the federation's official football partner under a three-year agreement, supplying 2,000 footballs annually.

In December 2025, the BFF signed a ten-year agreement with BSRM as its official development partner. The agreement covers support for nationwide scouting and talent identification programmes. In the same month, TikTok announced a year-long partnership with the BFF, becoming its official entertainment partner.

== See also ==
- Bangladesh national football team
- Bangladesh women's national football team
- Bangladesh national futsal team
- Bangladesh women's national futsal team
- East Pakistan Sports Federation
- List of Bangladeshi football champions
- Football in Bangladesh
- Women's football in Bangladesh
