= List of stadiums in Asia =

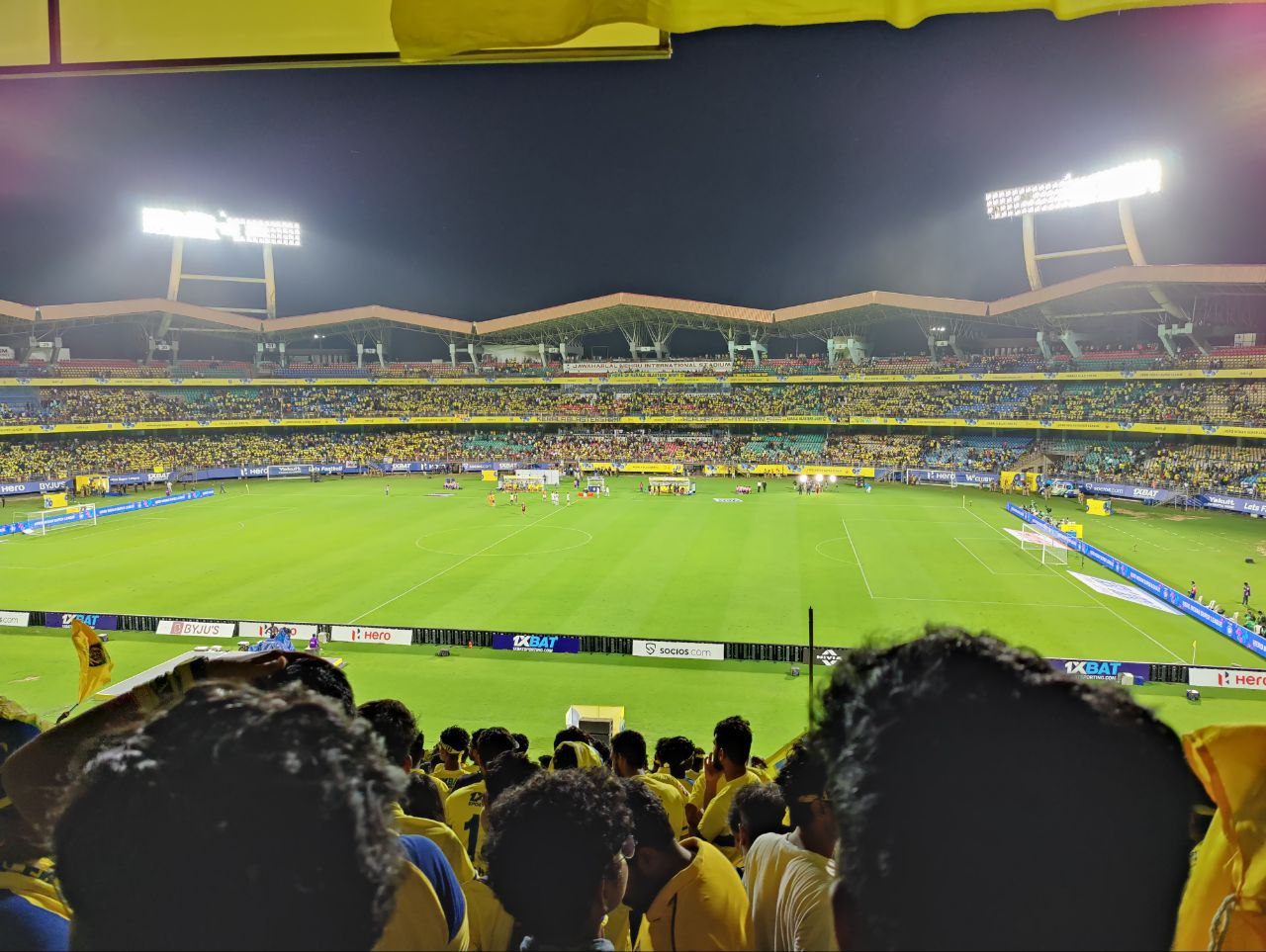
The Jawaharlal Nehru Stadium, the home of the Kerala Blasters, a football club from India.

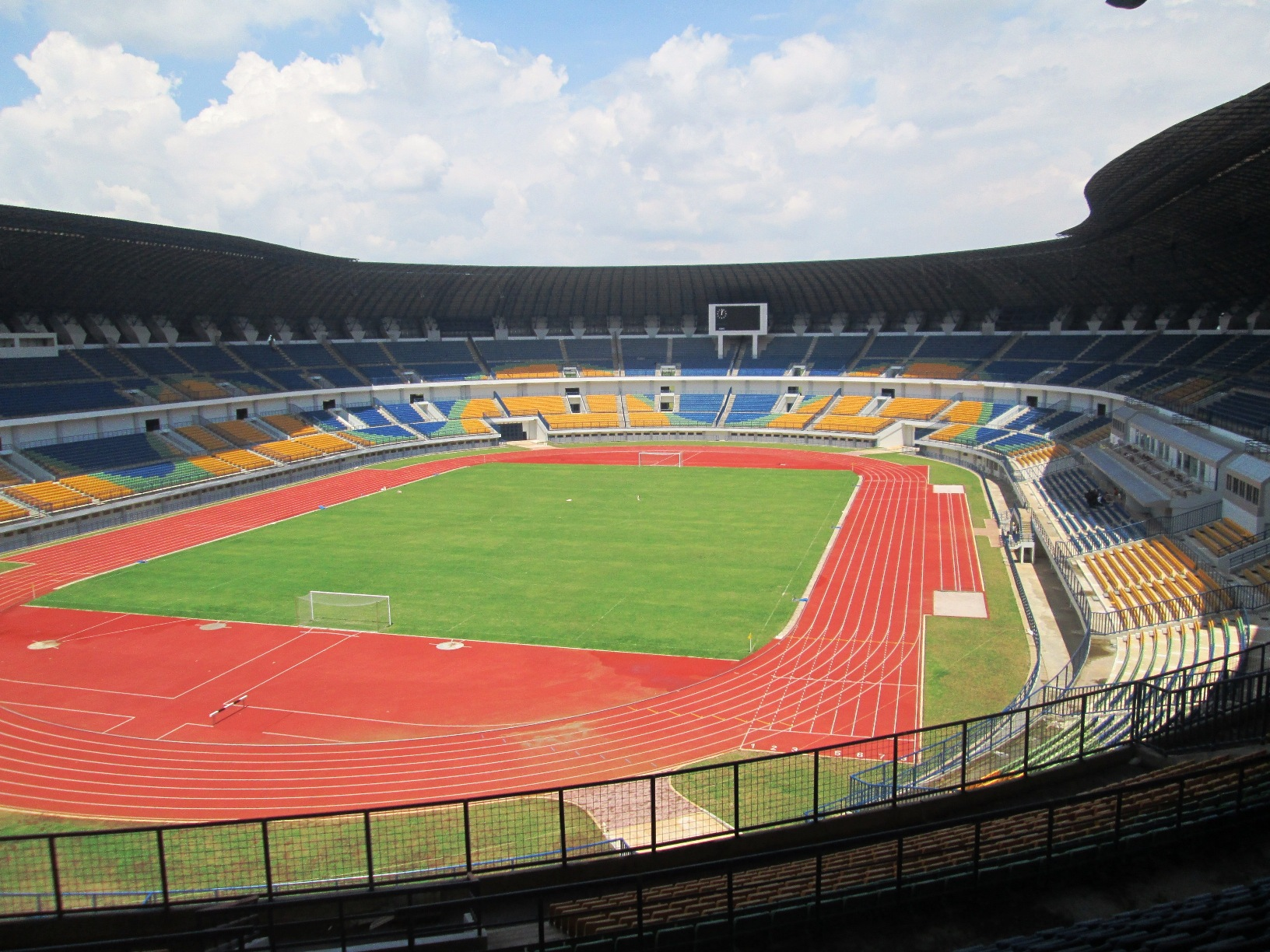
The Gelora Bandung Lautan Api Stadium, the home of the Indonesian club Persib.

The following is a list of stadiums in Central Asia, East Asia, South Asia, Southeast Asia, and West Asia.

== Central Asia ==
=== Afghanistan ===
- National Stadium, Kabul
- Kabul National Cricket Stadium, Kabul
- Ghazi Amanullah Khan International Cricket Stadium, Jalalabad
- Khost City Stadium, Khost City
- Kandahar International Cricket Stadium, Kandahar
- Ghazi Stadium, Kabul
- Afghanistan Football Federation Stadium, Kabul

=== Kazakhstan ===
- Astana Arena, Astana
- Kazhimukan Munaitpasov Stadium (Shymkent), Shymkent

=== Kyrgyzstan ===
- Spartak Stadium, Bishkek

=== Tajikistan ===
- Pamir Stadium, Dushanbe
- National Stadium of Tajikistan, Dushanbe

=== Turkmenistan ===
- Ashgabat Olympic Stadium, Ashgabat
- Köpetdag Stadium, Ashgabat
- Nusaý Stadium, Ashgabat
- Garaşsyzlyk Stadium, Dashoguz
- Sport toplumy (Abadan)
- Sport toplumy (Balkanabat)
- Sport toplumy (Daşoguz)
- Sport toplumy (Mary)
- Türkmenabat Stadium, Türkmenabat
- Zähmet Stadium
- Şagadam Stadium

=== Uzbekistan ===
- Bunyodkor Stadium, Tashkent
- Pakhtakor Markaziy Stadium, Tashkent
- Markaziy Stadium, Bukhoro
- Markaziy Stadium, Kosonsoy
- Markaziy Stadium, Namangan

== East Asia ==
=== China ===
==== Mainland ====
- Anqing Sports Centre Stadium, Anqing
- Baoji City Stadium, Baoji
- Beijing National Stadium, Beijing
- Century Lotus Stadium, Foshan
- Changchun City Stadium, Changchun
- Chengdu Sports Center, Chengdu
- Chengshan Stadium, Weihai
- Chenzhou Olympic Sports Centre Stadium, Chenzhou
- Chongqing Olympic Sports Centre, Chongqing
- Coca-Cola Stadium, Xi'an
- Dalian People's Stadium, Dalian
- Datianwan Stadium, Chongqing
- Fuling Stadium, Chongqing
- Fushun Leifeng Stadium, Fushun
- Fuzhou Stadium, Fuzhou
- Guangdong Olympic Stadium, Guangzhou
- Hanghai Stadium, Zhengzhou
- Hankou Sports Centre, Wuhan
- Helong Stadium, Changsha
- Henan Stadium, Zhengzhou
- Hongchen Stadium, Qingdao
- Hongkou Stadium, Shanghai
- Huanglong Stadium, Hangzhou
- Jiaodaruisun Stadium, Xi'an
- Jinzhou Stadium, Dalian
- Jiujiang Stadium, Jiujiang
- Langfang Stadium, Langfang
- Liuzhou Sports Center, Beijing
- Nanjing Olympic Sports Center, Nanjing
- Olympic Green Tennis Centre, Beijing
- Olympic Sports Centre, Beijing
- Qilihe Stadium, Lanzhou
- Qinhuangdao Olympic Sport Stadium, Qinhuangdao
- Shandong Stadium, Jinan
- Shanghai Stadium, Shanghai
- Shangri-La County Stadium, Shangri-La County
- Shaoguan City Stadium, Shaoguan
- Shenyang Sports Center, Shenyang
- Shenzhen Stadium, Shenzhen
- South Lake Sports Center, Zigong
- Sichuan Stadium, Chengdu
- Skydome of Shhijiashunang, Xi'an
- Suzhou City Stadium, Suzhou
- Taizhou Sports Center, Taizhou
- TEDA Football Stadium, Tianjin
- Tianhe Stadium, Guangzhou
- Tuodong Stadium, Kunming
- Ulanqab Stadium, Ulanqab
- Weihai Stadium, Weihai
- Workers Stadium, Beijing
- Wuhan Stadium, Wuhan
- Wuhu Olympic Stadium, Wuhu
- Wulihe Stadium, Shenyang
- Wutaisha Stadium, Nanjing
- Xiamen Stadium, Xiamen
- Xiangtan City Stadium, Xiangtan
- Xinhua Road Sports Center, Wuhan
- Xining Stadium, Xining
- Xinxiang Stadium, Luoyang
- Xinyu Stadium, Xinyu
- Xuzhou Olympic Sports Centre Stadium, Xuzhou
- Yangquan Stadium, Yangquan
- Yanji People's Stadium, Yanji
- Yellow Dragon Stadium, Hangzhou
- Yingkou Olympic Sports Centre Stadium, Yingkou
- Yizhong Center, Qingdao
- Yuexiu Mountain Stadium, Guangzhou
- Yulin Stadium, Yulin

==== Hong Kong ====
- Hong Kong Stadium, So Kon Po, Hong Kong Island
- Kai Tak Stadium, Kai Tak, Kowloon
- Ma On Shan Sports Ground, Ma On Shan, Sha Tin, New Territories
- Mong Kok Stadium, Mong Kok, Kowloon
- Queen Elizabeth Stadium, Happy Valley, Hong Kong Island
- Sha Tin Sport Ground, Sha Tin, Sha Tin, New Territories
- Siu Sai Wan Sports Ground, Eastern District, Hong Kong Island
- Wan Chai Sports Ground, Wan Chai, Hong Kong Island

==== Macau ====
- Estádio Campo Desportivo, Taipa, Municipality of the Islands

=== Republic of China ===
- Chungcheng Stadium, Kaohsiung
- Taichung Stadium, Taichung
- Tainan Municipal Xinying Stadium, Tainan
- Banqiao Stadium, New Taipei
- Taipei Dome, Taipei
- Tainan Dome, Tainan
- Taichung Municipal Stadium, Taichung
- Taoyuan City Stadium, Taoyuan
- National Stadium, Kaohsiung
- Yunlin County Stadium, Yunlin

=== Japan ===
- Botchan Stadium, Matsuyama
- Ecopa Stadium, Shizuoka
- Iwaki Baseball Stadium, Fukushima
- Iwate Prefectural Sports Park Athletic Stadium, Morioka
- Kagawa Stadium, Takamatsu
- Kashima Soccer Stadium, Ibaraki
- Kitakami Stadium, Kitakami
- Kiyohara Baseball Stadium, Utsunomiya
- KKWing Stadium, Kumamoto
- Kobe Universiade Memorial Stadium, Kobe
- Meiji Jingu Stadium, Tokyo
- Miyagi Baseball Stadium, Sendai
- Miyagi Stadium, Miyagi
- Muscat Stadium, Kurashiki
- Nagai Stadium, Osaka
- Nagano Olympic Stadium, Nagano
- National Stadium, Tokyo
- Nissan Stadium, Yokohama
- Saitama Stadium, Saitama
- Sapporo Dome, Sapporo
- Sendai City Athletic Stadium, Sendai
- Sendai Stadium, Sendai
- Stadium Big Eye, Ōita
- Sun Marine Stadium, Miyazaki
- Tohoku Denryoku Big Swan Stadium, Niigata
- Tokyo Dome, Tokyo
- Toyama Municipal Baseball Stadium Alpen Stadium, Toyama
- Toyota Stadium, Toyota City
- Wing Stadium, Kobe
- Yokohama Stadium, Yokohama

=== North Korea ===
- Chandongcha Park, Chongjin
- Haeju Stadium, Haeju
- Kim Il-sung Stadium, Pyongyang
- May Day Stadium, Pyongyang
- Nampo Stadium, Nampo
- Pyongyang Arena, Pyongyang
- Seosan Stadium, Pyongyang
- Sinuiju Stadium, Sinuiju
- Western Kaesong Park, Kaesong
- Wonsan Stadium, Wonsan
- Yanggakdo Stadium, Pyongyang

=== South Korea ===
- Ansan Stadium, Ansan
- Bucheon Stadium, Bucheon
- Busan Asiad Stadium, Busan
- Changwon Civil Stadium, Changwon
- Cheonan Baekseok Stadium, Cheonan
- Chuncheon Civil Stadium, Chuncheon
- Daegu Stadium, Daegu
- Daejeon World Cup Stadium. Daejeon
- Dongdaemun Stadium, Seoul
- Duryu Park Stadium, Daegu
- Gangneung Stadium, Gangneung
- Gimcheon Stadium, Gimcheon
- Gimhae Stadium, Gimhae
- Goyang Stadium, Goyang
- Gumi Civil Stadium, Gumi
- Gwangyang Football Stadium, Gwangyang
- Gwangju City Public Stadium, Gwangju
- Guus Hiddink Stadium, Gwangju
- Hanbat Stadium, Daejeon
- Incheon Civic Stadium, Incheon
- Incheon Football Stadium, Incheon
- Incheon Munhak Stadium, Incheon
- Incheon Munhak Baseball Stadium, Incheon
- Jasmil Baseball Stadium, Seoul
- Jecheon Stadium, Jecheon
- Jeju Stadium, Jeju
- Jeju World Cup Stadium, Jeju
- Jeonju Stadium, Jeonju
- Jeonju Civil Stadium, Jeonju
- Jeonju World Cup Stadium, Jeonju
- Masan Stadium, Masan
- Munsu Cup Stadium, Ulsan
- Opo Public Stadium, Seoul
- Paju Public Stadium, Paju
- Sangju Stadium, Sangju
- Seongnam 2 Stadium, Seongnam
- Seoul Olympic Stadium, Seoul
- Seoul World Cup Stadium, Seoul
- Shilchon Public Stadium, Gwangju
- Steelyard Stadium, Pohang
- Suwon Civic Stadium, Suwon
- Suwon World Cup Stadium, Suwon
- Toichon Public Stadium, Gwangju
- Uijeongbu Stadium, Uijeongbu

=== Mongolia ===
- National Sports Stadium, Ulaanbaatar

== South Asia ==
=== Bangladesh ===
- Bangabandhu National Stadium, Dhaka
- Bangladesh Army Stadium, Dhaka
- Barisal Divisional Stadium, Barisal
- Bir Muktijoddha Sirajul Islam Stadium, Panchagarh
- Bir Shrestha Hamidur Rahman Stadium, Jhenaidah
- Bir Sherestha Mostafa Kamal Stadium, Dhaka
- Chandpur Stadium, Chandpur
- Chapai Nawabganj Stadium, Nawabganj
- Comilla Stadium, Comilla
- Cox's Bazar Stadium, Cox's Bazar
- Dhanmondi Cricket Stadium, Dhaka
- Dinajpur Stadium, Dinajpur
- Faridpur Stadium, Faridpur
- Fatullah Osmani Stadium, Narayanganj
- Habiganj Jalal Stadium, Habiganj
- Jamalpur Stadium, Jamalpur
- Joypurhat Stadium, Joypurhat
- Khagrachhari Stadium, Khagrachhari
- Khulna District Stadium, Khulna
- Khulna Divisional Stadium, Khulna
- Kushtia Stadium, Kushtia
- Lakshmipur Stadium, Lakshmipur
- Lalmonirhat Stadium, Lalmonirhat
- MA Aziz Stadium, Chittagong
- Magura Stadium, Magura
- Manikganj Stadium, Manikganj
- Munshiganj Stadium, Munshiganj
- Mymensingh Stadium, Mymensingh
- Narayanganj Osmani Stadium, Narayanganj
- Natore Stadium, Natore
- Niaz Mohammad Stadium, Brahmanbaria
- Nur Mohammad Stadium, Narail
- Pabna Stadium, Pabna
- Patuakhali Stadium, Patuakhali
- Rajshahi District Stadium, Rajshahi
- Rangamati Stadium, Rangamati
- Rangpur Cricket Garden, Rangpur
- Rangpur Stadium, Rangpur
- Saifur Rahman Stadium, Moulvibazar
- Shaeed Samsuddin Stadium, Sirajganj
- Shah Abdul Hamid Stadium, Gaibandha
- Shaheed Barkat Stadium, Gazipur
- Shaheed Bulu Stadium, Noakhali
- Shaheed Chandu Stadium, Bogra
- Shaheed Kamruzzaman Stadium, Rajshahi
- Shaheed Salam Stadium, Feni
- Shamsul Huda Stadium, Jessore
- Sheikh Fazlul Haque Mani Stadium, Gopalganj
- Sher-e-Bangla Cricket Stadium, Dhaka
- Sunamganj Stadium, Sunamganj
- Sylhet District Stadium, Sylhet
- Sylhet Divisional Stadium, Sylhet
- Lusail Mini Stadium,Sylhet
- Tangail Stadium, Tangail
- Thakurgaon Stadium, Thakurgaon
- Zohur Ahmed Chowdhury Stadium, Chittagong

=== Bhutan ===
- Changlimithang Stadium, Thimphu

=== India ===
- Anna Stadium for Hockey, Tiruchirappalli
- Bangalore Hockey Stadium, Bengaluru
- Barabati Stadium, Cuttack
- Brabourne Stadium, Mumbai
- Chandrasekharan Nair Stadium, Thiruvananthapuram
- Chhatrasal Stadium, New Delhi
- Dadaji Kondadev Stadium, Mumbai
- Dhyan Chand National Stadium, New Delhi
- Dr. Y. S. Rajasekhara Reddy ACA–VDCA Cricket Stadium, Visakhapatnam
- DY Patil Stadium, Navi Mumbai
- Eden Gardens, Kolkata
- Fateh Maidan Tennis Complex, Hyderabad
- Feroz Shah Kotla, New Delhi
- Gachibowli Athletic Stadium, Hyderabad
- Gachibowli Hockey Stadium, Hyderabad
- Green Park Stadium, Kanpur
- Holkar Stadium, Indore
- Indira Gandhi Athletic Stadium, Guwahati
- Jawaharlal Nehru Stadium, Chennai
- Jawaharlal Nehru Stadium, Delhi
- Jawaharlal Nehru Stadium, Kochi
- Jawaharlal Nehru Stadium, Indore
- Jawaharlal Municipal Stadium, Kannur
- JRD Tata Sports Complex, Jamshedpur
- Kalinga Stadium, Bhubaneswar
- Kanchenjunga Stadium, Siliguri
- Khuman Lampak Main Stadium, Imphal
- Kishore Bharati Krirangan, Kolkata
- Lal Bahadur Shastri Stadium, Hyderabad
- M. A. Chidambaram Stadium, Chennai
- M. Chinnaswamy Stadium, Bengaluru
- Maharana Bhupal Stadium, Udaipur
- Mayor Radhakrishnan Stadium, Chennai
- Municipal Corporation Stadium, Kozhikode
- Narendra Modi Stadium, Ahmedabad (World's largest stadium)
- Nehru Stadium, Pune
- Nungambakkam Tennis Complex, Chennai
- Pune International Cricket Centre, Pune
- Punjab Cricket Association Stadium, Chandigarh
- Rajiv Gandhi International Cricket Stadium, Hyderabad
- Rajiv Gandhi Stadium, Delhi
- Roop Singh Stadium, Gwalior
- Sawai Mansingh Stadium, Jaipur
- SDAT Tennis Stadium, Chennai
- Sector 16 Stadium, Chandigarh
- Sector 42 Stadium, Chandigarh
- Shree Shiv Chhatrapati Sports Complex, Pune
- Sree Kanteerava Stadium, Bengaluru
- Srikantadatta Narasimha Raja Wadeyar Ground, Mysuru
- Wankhede Stadium, Mumbai
- Yuva Bharati Krirangan, Kolkata (Salt Lake Stadium)

=== Maldives ===
- Rasmee Dhandu Stadium, Male

=== Nepal ===
- Dasarath Rangasala Stadium, Kathmandu
- Sahid Rangsala, Biratnagar
- Dharan Stadium, Dharan
- Halchowk Stadium, Kathmandu
- Rajbiraj Stadium, Rajbiraj
- Narayani Stadium Birgunj
- Pokhara Rangasala Stadium, Pokhara
- Tillottamma rangasala, Butwal
- Dhangadhi Stadium, Dhangadhi
- Mahakali Rangasala, Mahendranagar

=== Pakistan ===
- Arbab Niaz Stadium, Peshawar
- Ayub National Stadium, Quetta
- Abdul Sattar Edhi Hockey Stadium, Karachi
- Bahawal Stadium, Bahawalpur
- Faisalabad Hockey Stadium, Faisalabad
- Gaddafi Stadium, Lahore
- Hyderabad Football Stadium, Hyderabad
- Ibn-e-Qasim Bagh Stadium, Multan
- Iqbal Stadium, Faisalabad
- Jinnah Sports Stadium, Islamabad
- Jinnah Stadium, Gujranwala
- Jinnah Stadium Sialkot, Sialkot
- KMC Football Stadium, Karachi
- Multan Cricket Stadium, Multan
- National Hockey Stadium, Lahore
- National Stadium, Karachi
- Niaz Stadium, Hyderabad
- Peoples Football Stadium, Karachi
- Pindi Club Ground, Rawalpindi
- Punjab Stadium, Lahore
- Qayyum Stadium, Peshawar
- Quaid-e-Azam Stadium, Mirpur
- Rawalpindi Cricket Stadium, Rawalpindi
- Sheikhupura Stadium, Sheikhupura
- Zafar Ali Stadium, Karachi

=== Sri Lanka ===
- Asgiriya Stadium, Kandy
- Bogambara Stadium, Kandy
- Colombo Cricket Club Ground, Colombo
- Galle International Stadium, Galle
- MRIC Stadium, Hambantota
- Kalutara Stadium, Kalutara
- Nittawela Rugby Stadium, Kandy
- Paikiasothy Saravanamuttu Stadium, Colombo
- Pallekele International Cricket Stadium, Kandy
- Ranasinghe Premadasa Stadium, Colombo
- Rangiri Dumbulla Stadium, Dambulla
- Sinhalese Sports Club Ground, Colombo
- Sugathadasa Stadium, Colombo
- Tyronne Fernando Stadium, Moratuwa
- Uyanwatte Stadium, Matara
- Welagedara Stadium, Kurunegala

== Southeast Asia ==
=== Brunei Darussalam ===
- Hassanal Bolkiah National Stadium, Bandar Seri Begawan

=== Cambodia ===
- Phnom Penh National Olympic Stadium, Phnom Penh
- RCAF Old Stadium Phnom Penh
- Svay Rieng Stadium, Svay Rieng
- RSN Stadium, Phnom Penh
- Morodok Techo National Stadium, Phnom Penh
- Cambodia Airways Stadium Phnom Penh
- SRU Stadium Siem Reap
- Prince Stadium Phnom Penh
- Svay Thnom Stadium Siem Reap

=== East Timor ===
- National Stadium, Dili

=== Indonesia ===
- Abu Bakrin Stadium, Magelang
- Ahmad Yani Stadium, Sumenep
- Aji Imbut Stadium, Kutai Kartanegara
- Andi Mattalatta Stadium, Makassar
- Batakan Stadium, Balikpapan
- Brawijaya Stadium, Kediri
- Bumi Sriwijaya Stadium, Palembang
- Diponegoro University Stadium, Semarang
- Gelora Delta Stadium, Sidoarjo
- Gajayana Stadium, Malang
- Gelora 10 November Stadium, Surabaya
- Gelora Bung Karno Stadium, Jakarta
- Gelora Bung Karno Madya Stadium, Jakarta
- Gelora Bung Tomo Stadium, Surabaya
- Gelora Bandung Lautan Api Stadium, Bandung
- Gelora Sriwijaya Stadium, Palembang
- Gelora Bumi Kartini Stadium, Jepara
- Hoegeng Stadium, Pekalongan
- Indomilk Arena, Tangerang
- Jakabaring Athletic Stadium, Palembang
- Jakarta International Stadium, Jakarta
- Jalak Harupat Soreang Stadium, Bandung
- Jatidiri Stadium, Semarang
- Kaharudin Nasution Rumbai Stadium, Pekanbaru
- Kanjuruhan Stadium, Malang
- Kapten I Wayan Dipta Stadium, Gianyar
- Lagaligo Stadium, Palopo
- Lukas Enembe Stadium, Jayapura
- Manahan Stadium, Solo
- Mandala Stadium, Jayapura
- Menteng Stadium, Jakarta
- Merpati Stadium, Depok
- Moh Sarengat Stadium, Batang
- Mulawarman Stadium, Bontang
- Ngurah Rai Stadium, Denpasar
- Pakansari Stadium, Bogor
- Palaran Stadium, Samarinda
- Pendidikan Stadium, Wamena
- Riau Main Stadium, Pekanbaru
- Riau University Mini Stadium, Pekanbaru
- Satria Stadium, Purwokerto
- Siliwangi Stadium, Bandung
- Soemantri Brodjonegoro Stadium, Jakarta
- Teladan Stadium, Medan
- Tugu Stadium, Jakarta
- University of Indonesia Stadium, Depok

=== Laos ===
- Laos National Stadium, Vientiane
- New Laos National Stadium, Vientiane
- Champasak Stadium, Pakse

=== Malaysia ===
- Batu Kawan Stadium, Penang
- Bukit Jalil Stadium, Kuala Lumpur
- City Stadium, Penang
- Darulaman Stadium, Alor Star
- Darulmakmur Stadium, Kuantan
- DBI Sports Complex, Ipoh
- Hang Jebat Stadium, Melaka
- Hang Tuah Stadium, Melaka
- Langkawi Stadium, Langkawi
- Likas Stadium, Kota Kinabalu
- Merdeka Stadium, Kuala Lumpur
- Perak Stadium, Perak
- Sarawak Stadium, Kuching
- Shah Alam Stadium, Shah Alam
- Sultan Mizan Zainal Abidin Stadium, Kuala Terengganu
- Sultan Mohammad IV Stadium, Kota Bharu
- Tan Sri Hassan Yunus Stadium, Johor Bahru
- Tuanku Abdul Rahman Stadium, Seremban
- Utama Stadium, Kangar
- Sultan Ibrahim Stadium, Iskandar Puteri

=== Myanmar ===
- Bogyoke Aung San Stadium, Yangon
- Thuwanna YTC Stadium, Yangon
- Wunna Theikdi Stadium, Nay Pyi Daw
- Mandalarthiri Stadium, Mandalay
- Zayarthiri Stadium, Nay Pyi Daw

=== Philippines ===
- New Clark City Athletics Stadium, New Clark City, Capas, Tarlac
- Philippine Sports Stadium, Ciudad de Victoria, Bocaue, Bulacan
- Marcos Stadium, Laoag, Ilocos Norte
- Sorsogon Sports Coliseum, Sorsogon City, Sorsogon
- Panaad Stadium, Bacolod, Negros Occidental
- Rizal Memorial Stadium, Manila
- Biñan Football Field, Biñan, Laguna

=== Singapore ===
- Bedok Stadium
- Bishan Stadium
- Bukit Gombak Stadium
- Choa Chu Kang Stadium
- Hougang Stadium
- Jalan Besar Stadium
- Jurong East Stadium
- Jurong Stadium
- Jurong West Stadium
- National Stadium
- Queenstown Stadium
- Singapore Indoor Stadium
- Tampines Stadium
- The Float@Marina Bay
- Toa Payoh Stadium
- Woodlands Stadium
- Yishun Stadium

=== Thailand ===
- Rajmangala Stadium, Bangkok
- Suphachalasai Stadium, Bangkok
- Thai Army Sports Stadium, Bangkok
- Thai-Japanese Stadium, Bangkok
- Thephasadin Stadium, Bangkok
- PAT Stadium, Bangkok
- Nongprue Stadium, Pattaya
- Bira Circuit, Pattaya
- SCG Stadium, Pak Kret Nonthaburi
- United Stadium, Chiang Rai Chiang Rai
- 700th Anniversary Stadium, Mae Rim Chiang Mai
- Nakhon Sawan Stadium, Nakhon Sawan Nakhon Sawan
- 5 December 2007 Stadium, Nakhon Ratchasima Nakhon Ratchasima
- Suphanburi Municipality Stadium, Suphanburi Suphanburi
- Tinasulanon Stadium, Songkhla Songkhla
- Jiranakorn Stadium, Hatyai Songkhla
- Sarakul Stadium, Phuket Phuket
- Surat Thani Stadium, Bandon Surat Thani
- Thammasat Stadium, Khlong Luang Pathum Thani
- Leo Stadium, Thanyaburi Pathum Thani
- Phichit Stadium, Phichit Phichit
- Thunder Castle Stadium, Buriram Buriram
- Chonburi Municipality Stadium, Chonburi Chonburi
- Phrae Stadium, Phrae Phrae
- Thunghong Subdistrict municipality Stadium, Phrae Phrae

=== Vietnam ===
- Biên Hòa Stadium, Biên Hòa
- Cần Thơ Stadium, Cần Thơ
- Cao Lãnh Stadium, Cao Lãnh
- Chi Lăng Stadium, Đà Nẵng
- Đức Trọng Stadium, Đà Lạt
- Gò Đậu Stadium, Thủ Dầu Một
- Lạch Tray Stadium, Hải Phòng
- Lam Sơn Stadium, Hạ Long
- Long An Stadium, Tân An
- Long Xuyên Stadium, Long Xuyên
- Mỹ Đình National Stadium, Hà Nội
- Nha Trang Stadium, Nha Trang
- Pleiku Stadium, Pleiku
- Quân khu 7 Stadium, Ho Chi Minh City
- Quy Nhơn Stadium, Quy Nhơn
- Hàng Đẫy Stadium, Hà Nội
- Rạch Giá Stadium, Rạch Giá
- Tam Kỳ Stadium, Tam Kỳ
- Thanh Hóa Stadium, Thanh Hóa
- Thiên Truong Stadium, Nam Định
- Thống Nhất Stadium, Ho Chi Minh City
- Independence Stadium, Huế

== West Asia ==
=== Iran ===
- Foolad Arena Stadium, Ahvaz
- Azadi Stadium, Tehran
- Shahid Dr. Azodi Stadium, Rasht
- Ghadir Stadium, Ahvaz
- Foolad Shahr Stadium, Isfahan
- Hafezieh Stadium, Shiraz
- Iran Khodro Stadium, Karaj
- Naghsh-e Jahan Stadium, Isfahan
- Shahid Nassiri Stadium, Yazd
- Ekbatan Stadium, Tehran
- Imam Reza Stadium, Mashhad
- Shahid Dastgerdi Stadium, Tehran
- Shahid Shiroudi Stadium, Tehran
- Shohada-ye Nowshahr Stadium, Noshahr
- Takhti Stadium, Abadan
- Takhti Stadium, Bandar-e Anzali
- Takhti Stadium, Tabriz
- Takhti Stadium, Tehran
- Yadegar-e Emam Stadium, Tabriz
- Shahid Rajai Stadium, Qazvin
- Karegaran Stadium, Tehran
- Derafshifar Stadium, Tehran
- Shahid Derakhshan Stadium, Tehran
- Pars Stadium, Shiraz
- Azadi Stadium, Kermanshah

=== Armenia ===
- Banants Stadium, Yerevan
- Gyumri City Stadium, Gyumri
- Hrazdan Stadium, Yerevan
- Kotayk Stadium, Abovyan
- Republican Stadium, Yerevan
- Mika Stadium, Yerevan

=== Azerbaijan ===
- Baku Olympic Stadium, Baku
- Tofig Bahramov Stadium, Baku
- Shafa Stadium, Baku
- Lankaran City Stadium, Lankaran
- Ganja City Stadium, Ganja
- Gabala City Stadium, Gabala
- Ismat Gayibov Stadium, Baku
- Tofig Ismayilov Stadium, Baku
- Bakcell Arena, Baku
- Mehdi Huseynzade Stadium, Sumqayit
- Tovuz City Stadium, Tovuz
- Guzanli Olympic Complex Stadium, Aghdam
- Imarat Stadium, Aghdam
- Zaqatala City Stadium, Zaqatala
- Shovkat Ordukhanov Stadium, Qusar
- Salyan Olympic Sport Complex Stadium, Salyany
- Anatoliy Banishevskiy Stadium, Masally
- MOIK Stadium, Baku
- Zabrat Stadium, Baku
- Heydar Aliyev Stadium, Imishli
- Shamkir City Stadium, Shamkir
- Yevlakh City Stadium, Yevlakh
- AZAL Stadium, Baku
- Yashar Mammadzade Stadium, Mingachevir
- Nariman Narimanov Stadium, Neftçala

=== Bahrain ===
- Bahrain National Stadium, Riffa
- Muharraq Stadium
- Al Ahli Stadium

=== Georgia ===
- Boris Paichadze Stadium, Tbilisi
- Mikheil Meskhi Stadium, Tbilisi
- Givi Kiladze Stadium, Kutaisi
- Tengiz Burjanadze Stadium, Gori
- Erosi Manjgaladze Stadium, Samtredia
- Poladi Stadium, Rustavi
- Municipal Stadium (Zestaponi), Zestaponi
- Gulia Tutberidze Stadium, Zugdidi
- Fazisi Stadium, Poti
- Shevardeni Stadium, Tbilisi
- Tsentral Stadium (Batumi), Batumi
- Tamaz Stephania Stadium, Bolnisi

=== Iraq ===
- Al Shaab Stadium, Baghdad
- Franco Hariri Stadium, Arbil
- Kirkuk Olympic Stadium, Kirkuk
- Basra Sports City, Basra
- Karbala Sports City, Karbala
- Maysan Stadium, Amarah

=== Israel ===
- Teddy Stadium, Jerusalem
- Bloomfield Stadium, Tel Aviv
- Sammy Ofer Stadium, Haifa
- Turner Stadium, Be'er Sheva
- Netanya Stadium, Netanya
- HaMoshava Stadium, Petah Tikva
- Ramat Gan Stadium, Ramat Gan, Tel Aviv District
- Canada Stadium, Ramat HaSharon, Tel Aviv District

=== Jordan ===
- Amman International Stadium (Amman)
- King Abdullah Stadium (Amman)
- Prince Mohammed Stadium (Zarqa)
- Al-Hassan Stadium (Irbid)
- Prince Hashim Stadium (Al-Ramtha)
- Prince Faisal Stadium (Karak)
- Al-Salt Stadium (Al-Salt)
- Petra Stadium (Amman)
- Al-Madaba Field (Madaba)
- Al-Aqaba Field (Aqaba)
- Al-Israa' Field (Amman)
- Prince Ali Stadium (Mafraq)

=== Kuwait ===
- Al-Sadaqua Walsalam Stadium, Kuwait City
- Jaber Al-Ahmad International Stadium, Kuwait City
- Kazma SC Stadium, Kuwait City
- Sabah Al Salem Stadium, Kuwait City
- Al Kuwait Sports Club Stadium, Kuwait City
- Mohammed Al-Hamad Stadium, Hawalli
- Thamir Stadium, Hawalli
- Al Shabab Mubarak Alaiar Stadium, Jahra

=== Lebanon ===
- Camille Chamoun Sports City Stadium, Beirut

=== Oman ===
- Al Saada Stadium, Salalah
- Royal Oman Police Stadium, Muscat
- Salalah Sports Complex, Salalah
- Seeb Stadium, Seeb
- Sultan Qaboos Sports Complex, Muscat
- Sur Sports Complex, Sur

=== Palestine ===
- Palestine Stadium, gaza
- Faisal Al-Husseini International Stadium, A-Ram
- Jericho International Stadium, Jericho

=== Qatar ===
- Al Bayt Stadium, Al Khor
- Ahmed bin Ali Stadium, Al-Rayyan
- Education City Stadium, Al-Rayyan
- Khalifa International Stadium, Al-Wakrah
- Khalifa International Tennis and Squash Complex, Doha
- Lusail Iconic Stadium, Lusail
- Ras Abu Aboud Stadium, Doha
- Al Thumama Stadium, Doha
- West End Park International Cricket Stadium, Doha

=== Saudi Arabia ===
- King Abdul Aziz Stadium, Makkah
- King Abdullah Sports City, Jeddah
- King Fahd International Stadium, Riyadh
- Prince Abdul Aziz bin Musa'ed Stadium, Ha'il
- Prince Abdullah al-Faisal Stadium, Jeddah
- Prince Faisal bin Fahd Stadium, Riyadh
- Prince Mohamed bin Fahd Stadium, Dammam
- Prince Sultan bin Fahd Stadium, Jeddah

=== Syria ===
- Abbasiyyin Stadium, Damascus
- Al-Assad Stadium, Latakia
- Al-Baath Stadium, Jableh
- Al Basil Stadium, Latakia
- Al-Hamadaniah Stadium, Aleppo
- Al-Jalaa Stadium, Damascus
- Aleppo International Stadium, Aleppo
- Khaled Ibn Al Walid Stadium, Homs

=== Turkey ===
- Ankara 19 Mayıs Stadium – Ankara
- Ankara Aktepe Stadium – Ankara
- Bursa Atatürk Stadium – Bursa
- Diyarbakır Atatürk Stadium – Diyarbakır
- Erzurum Cemal Gürsel Stadium – Erzurum
- Eskişehir Atatürk Stadium – Eskişehir
- Gaziantep Kamil Ocak Stadium – Gaziantep
- Hüseyin Avni Aker Stadium – Trabzon
- Istanbul Park – Istanbul
- İzmir Alsancak Stadium – İzmir
- İzmir Atatürk Stadium – İzmir
- Kadir Has Stadium – Kayseri
- Mersin Stadium – Mersin
- Rize Atatürk Stadium – Rize
- Samsun 19 Mayıs Stadium – Samsun
- Şükrü Saracoğlu Stadium – Istanbul

=== United Arab Emirates ===
- Dubai International Cricket Stadium, Dubai
- ICC Academy Ground, Dubai
- Sheikh Khalifa International Stadium, Al Ain
- Sheikh Mohamed Bin Zayed Stadium, Abu Dhabi
- Sheikh Zayed Stadium, Abu Dhabi
- Zabeel Stadium, Dubai
- Hazza bin Zayed Stadium, Al Ain
- Sharjah Cricket Stadium, Sharjah

=== Yemen ===
- Althawra Sports City Stadium, Sanaa

== Gallery ==
Asian stadiums

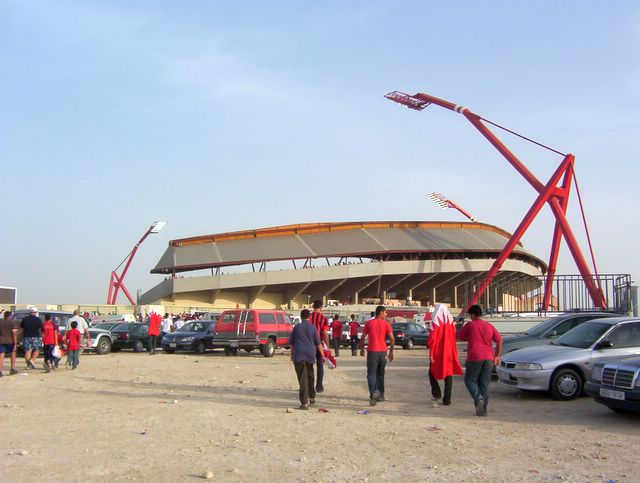
Bahrain National Stadium

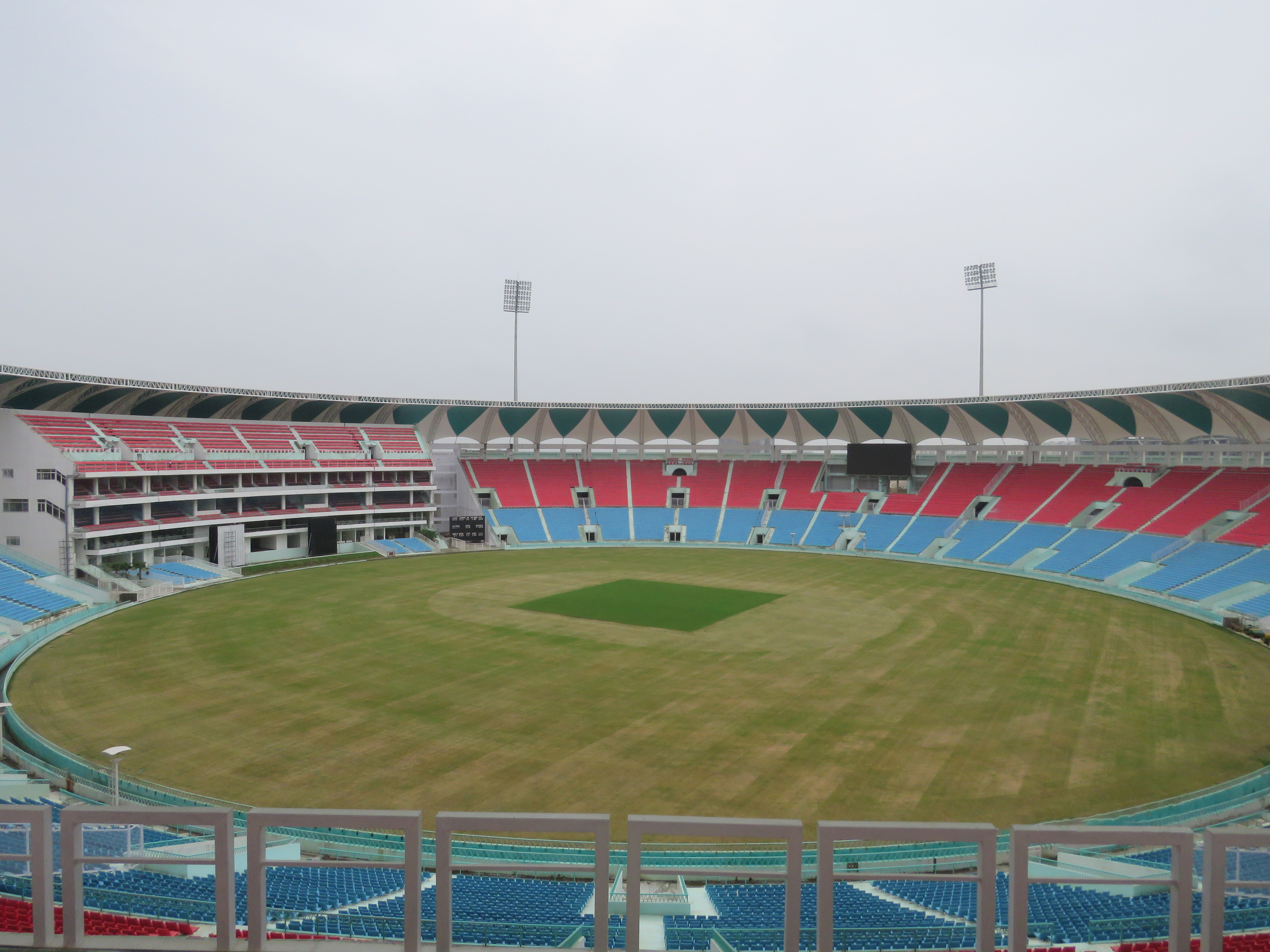
BRSABV Ekana Cricket Stadium

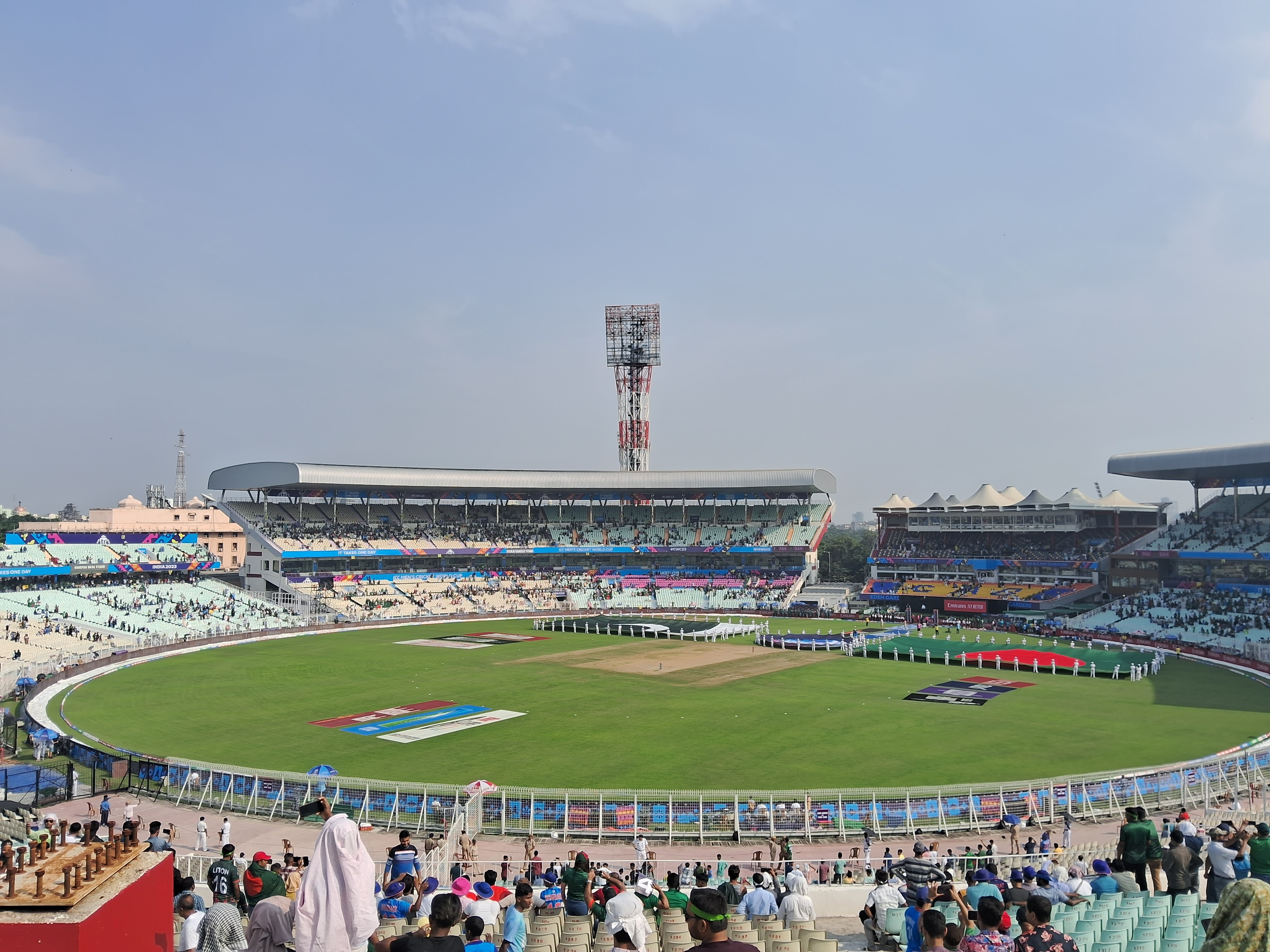
Eden Gardens

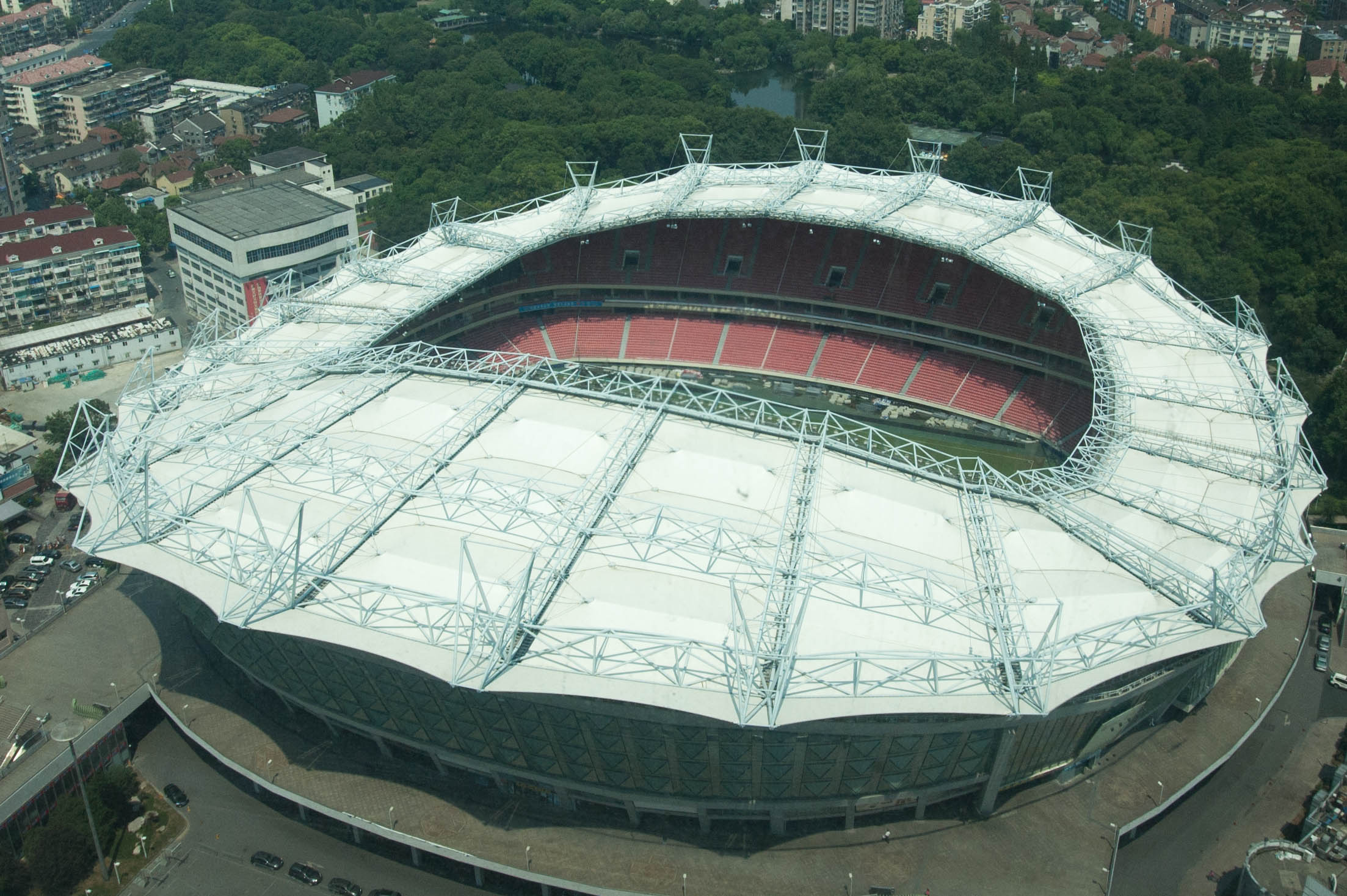
Hongkou Football Stadium

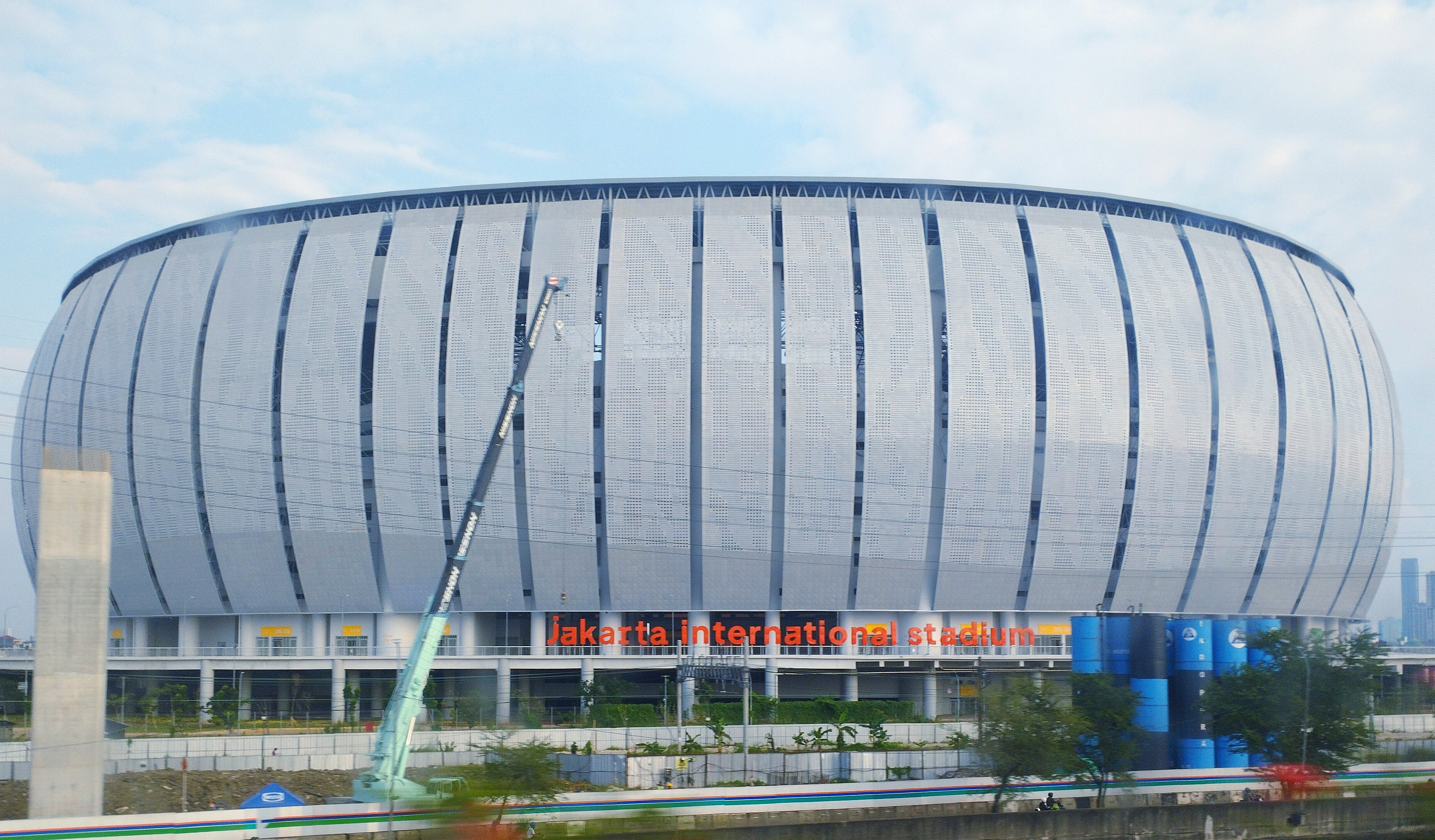
Jakarta International Stadium

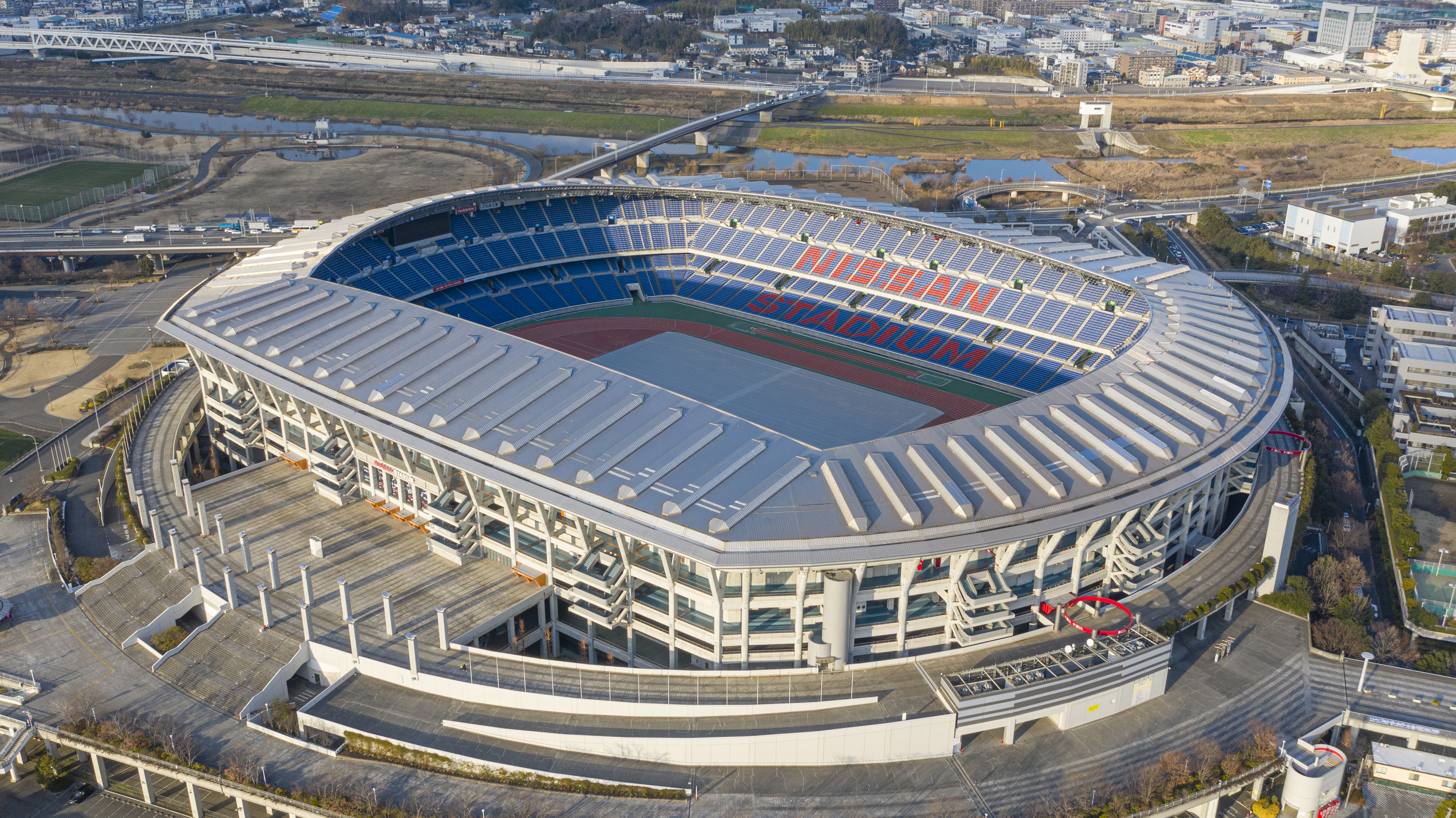
Nissan Stadium

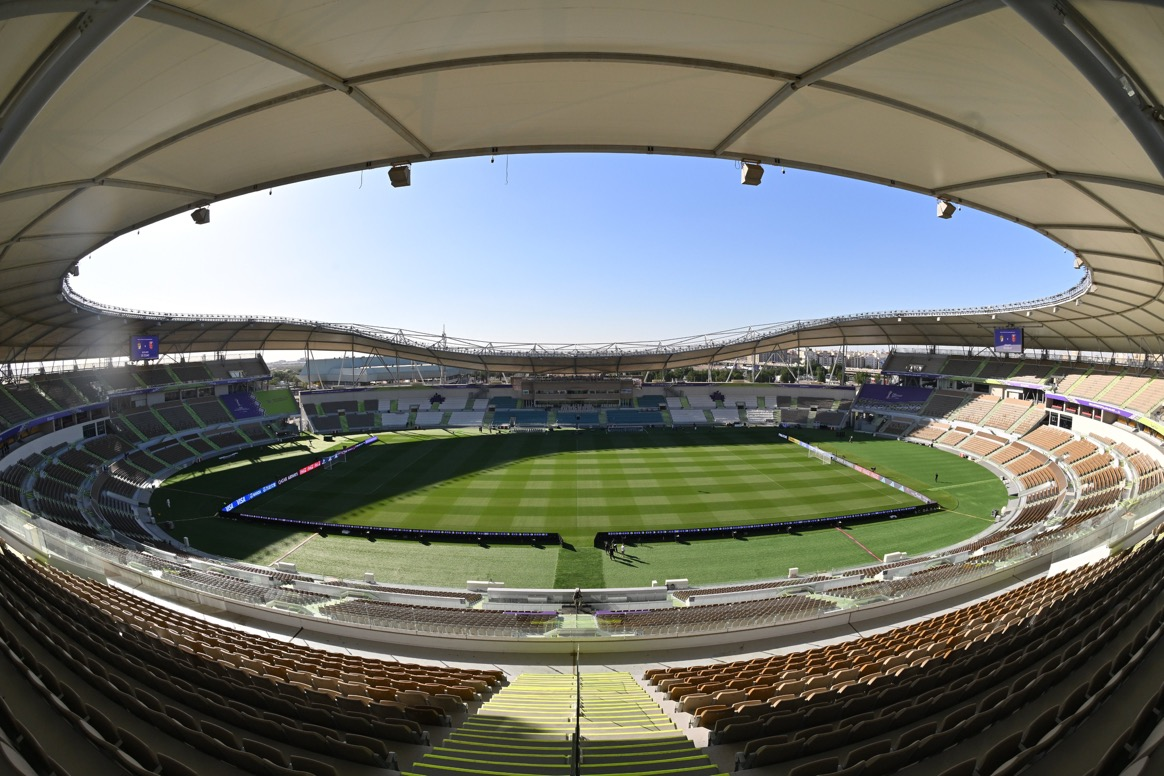
Prince Abdullah al-Faisal Sports City Stadium

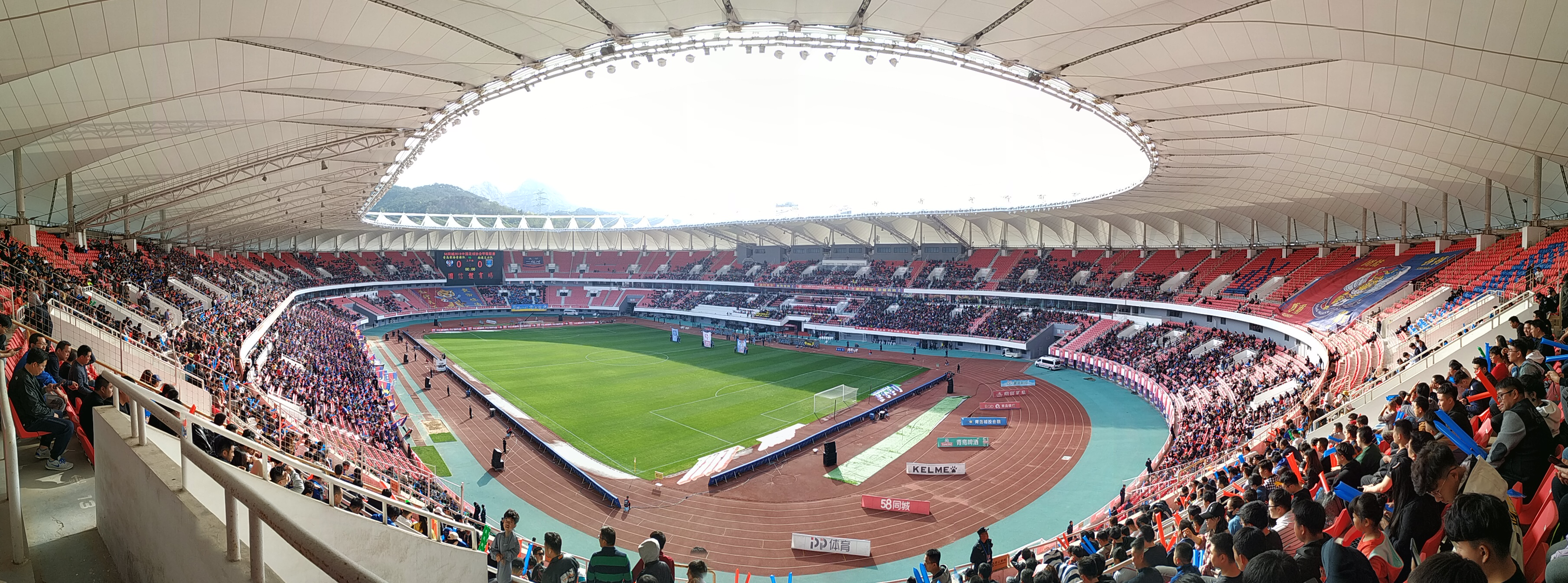
Qingdao Conson Stadium

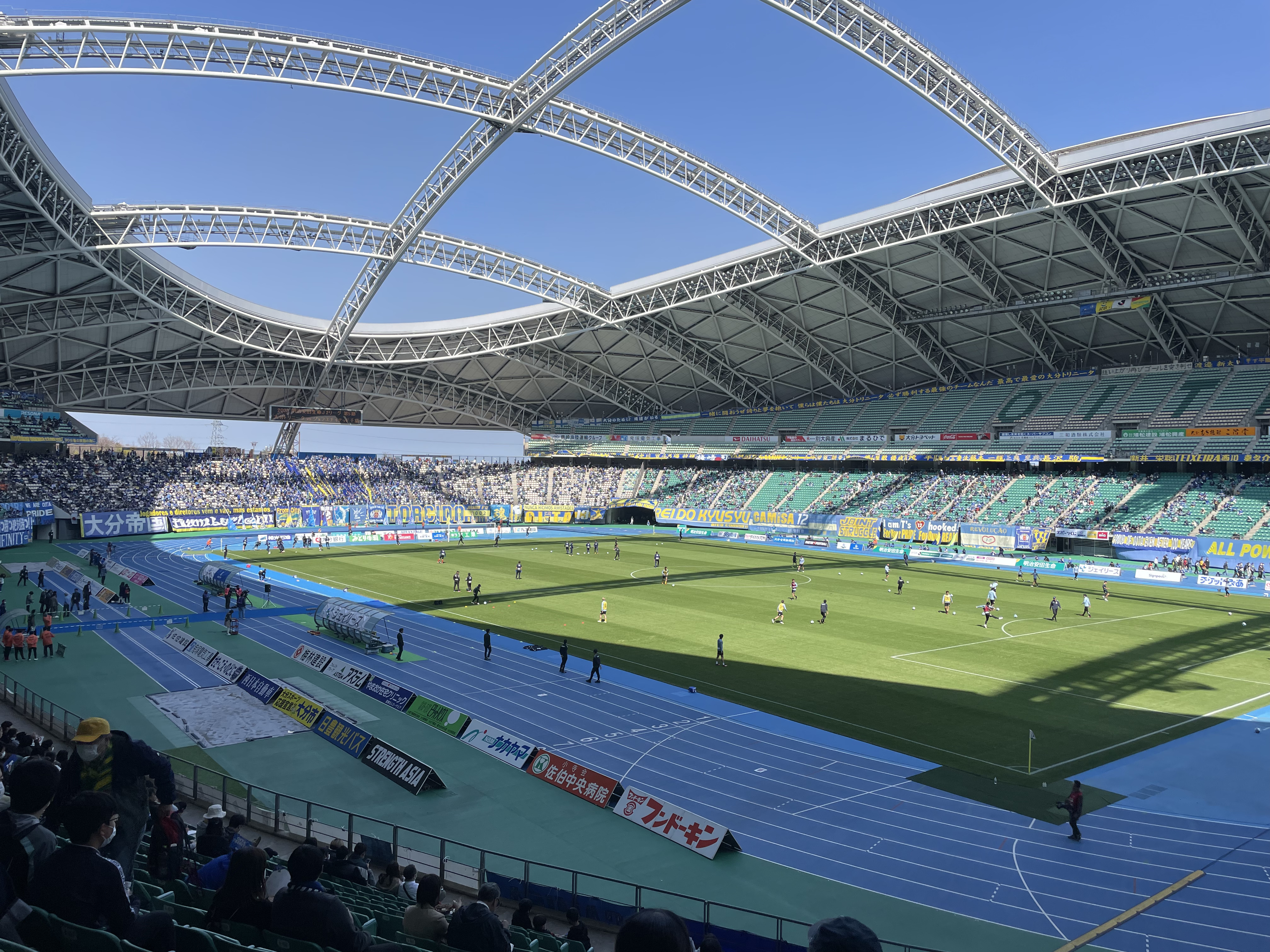
Resonac Dome Oita

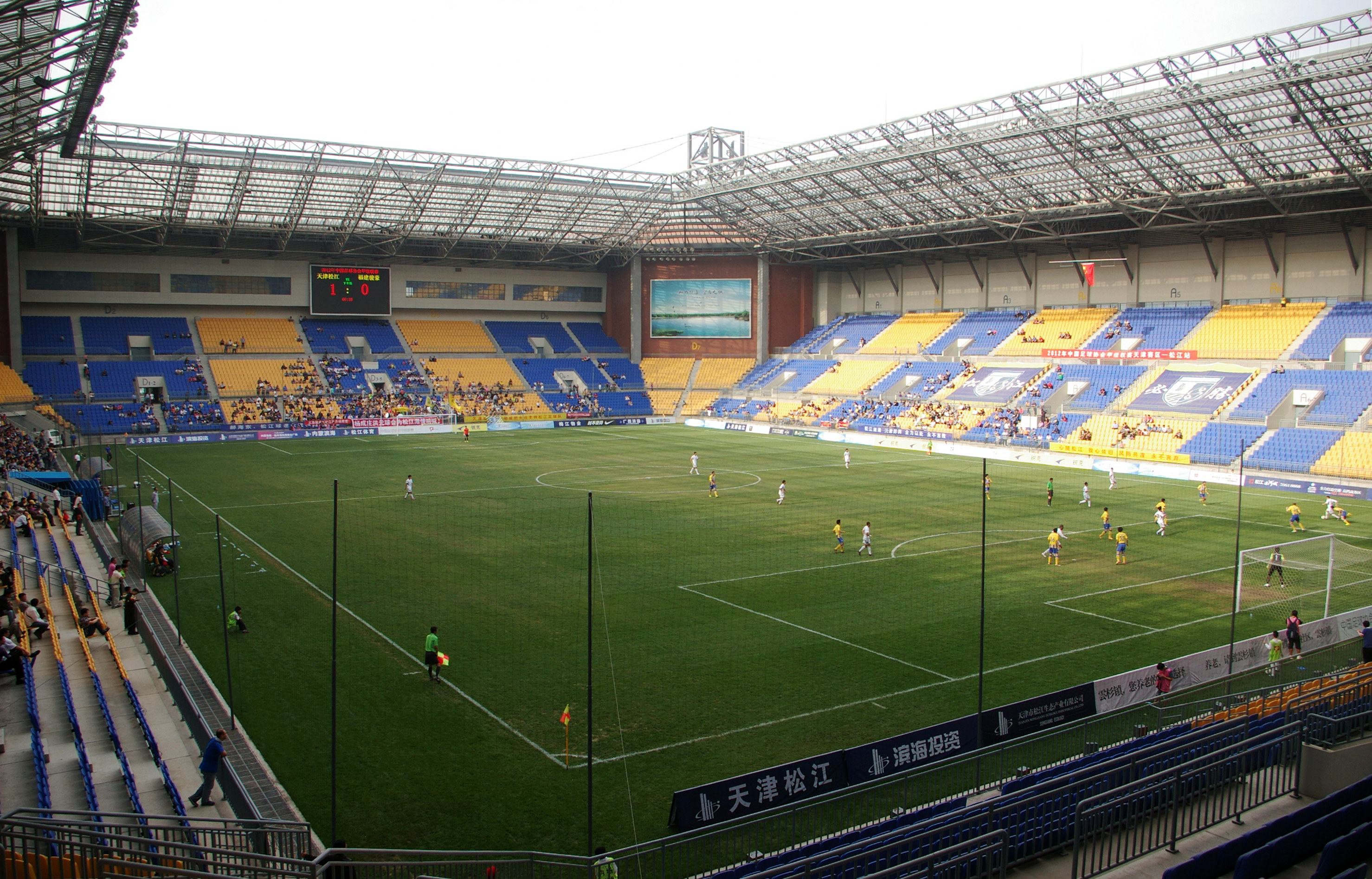
Tianjin Tuanbo Football Stadium

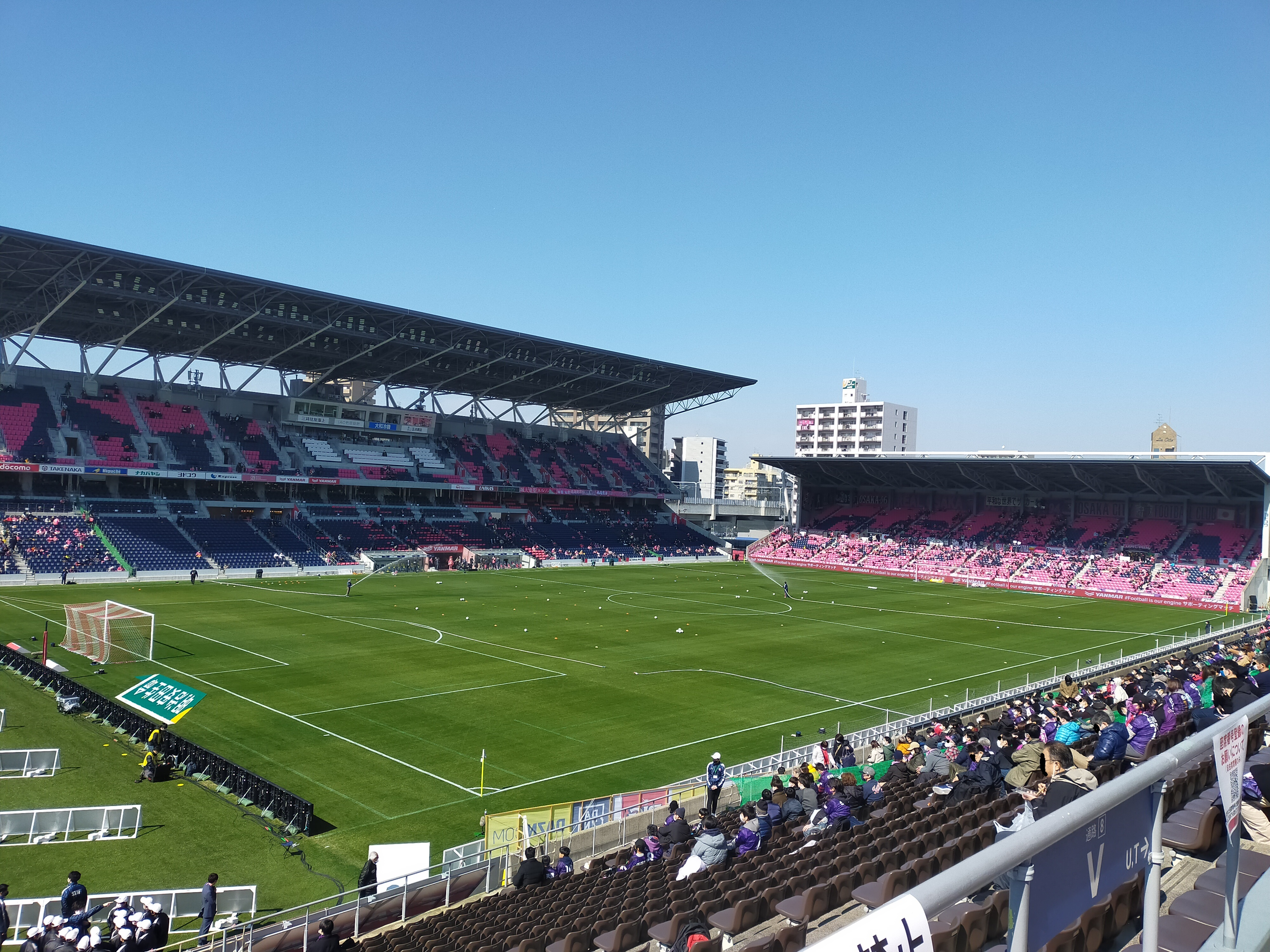
Yodoko Sakura Stadium

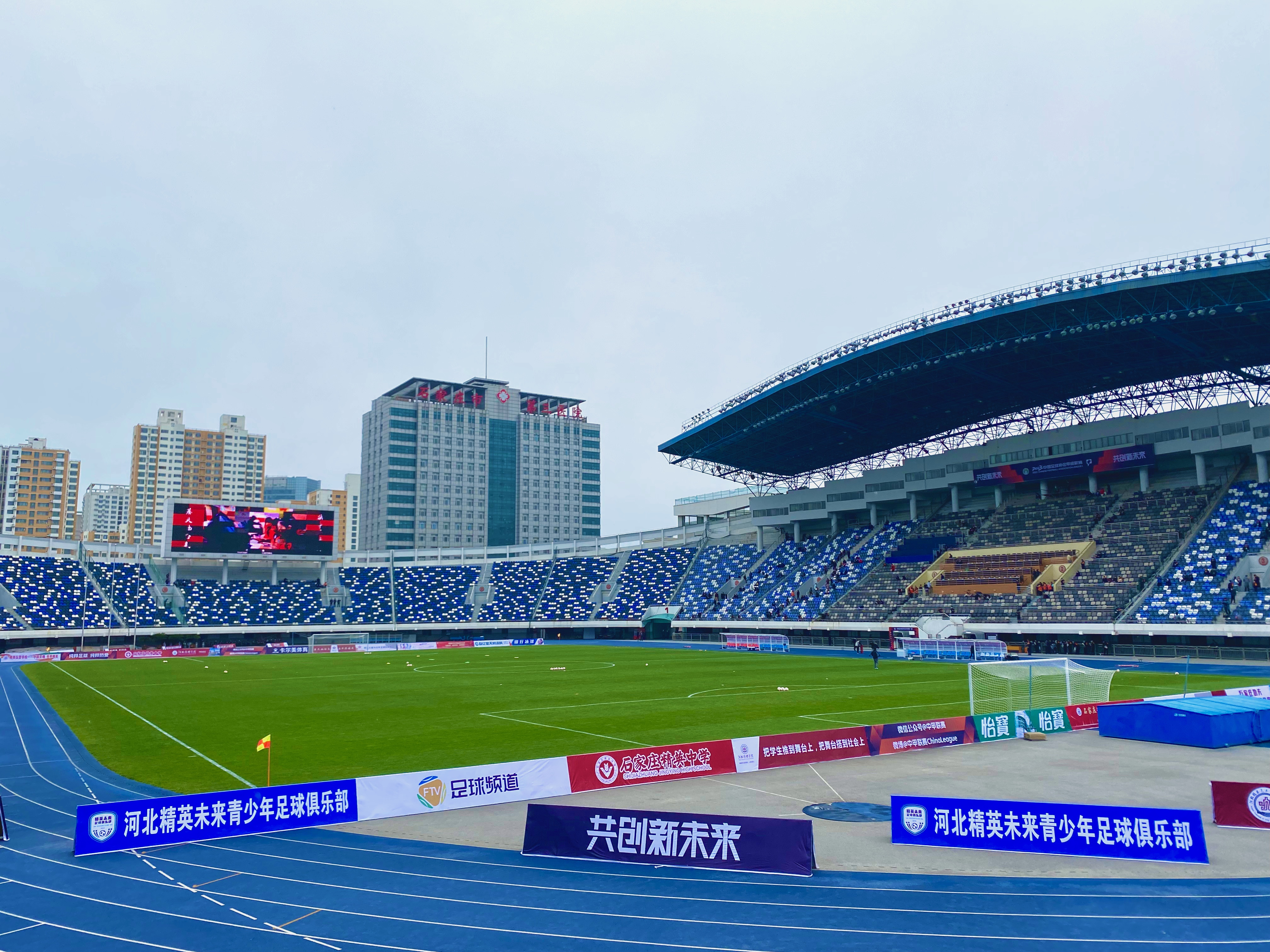
Yutong International Sports Centre Stadium

== See also ==
- List of stadiums in Africa
- List of stadiums in Central America and the Caribbean
- List of stadiums in Europe
- List of stadiums in North America
- List of stadiums in Oceania
- List of stadiums in South America
- List of Asian stadiums by capacity
- List of association football stadiums by country
- Lists of stadiums
