= Satkhira Stadium =

Stadium in Satkhira, Bangladesh

Coordinates: 22°43′11.89″N 89°04′27.92″E

Satkhira District Stadium
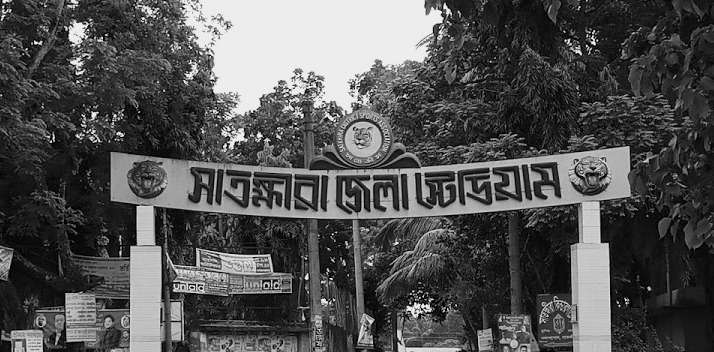
- Gate of Satkhira stadium
- Interactive map of Satkhira District Stadium
- Location: Satkhira, Bangladesh
- Owner: National Sports Council
- Operator: National Sports Council
- Capacity: 5,000
- Surface: Grass

Construction
- Opened: 1972

Tenants
- Satkhira Cricket Team; Satkhira Football Team; Satkhira U-18 Football Team

Satkhira Stadium is located by the Thana Rd, Satkhira, Bangladesh.

== See also ==
- Stadiums in Bangladesh
- List of cricket grounds in Bangladesh
- Sheikh Kamal International Stadium, Cox's Bazar
- Sheikh Kamal International Stadium, Gopalganj
