= Patuakhali Stadium =

Multi-purpose stadium located at Patuakhali, Bangladesh

Coordinates: 22°21′46.01″N 90°19′49.96″E

- Interactive map of Patuakhali Stadium
- Location: Patuakhali, Bangladesh
- Owner: National Sports Council
- Operator: National Sports Council
- Capacity: 10,000
- Surface: Grass

Tenants
- Patuakhali Football Team; Patuakhali Cricket Team

Patuakhali Stadium is located by the District Commissioner Office, Patuakhali, Bangladesh.

== Events ==
=== Yearly ===
- Deputy Gold Cup football
- Volleyball League
- Athletics
- Badminton
- Kabaddi
- Youth Cricket League
- Senior Cricket League and others.

== See also ==
- Stadiums in Bangladesh
- List of cricket grounds in Bangladesh
- Sheikh Kamal International Stadium, Cox's Bazar
- Sheikh Kamal International Stadium, Gopalganj
