= Barguna Stadium =

Stadium in Barguna, Bangladesh

- Interactive map of Barguna Stadium
- Location: Barguna, Bangladesh
- Coordinates: 22°09′38.62″N 90°08′02.74″E
- Owner: National Sports Council
- Operator: National Sports Council
- Surface: Grass
- Field size: 148 m x 120 m
- Field shape: Rectangular

Tenants
- Barguna Cricket Team; Barguna Football Team

Barguna stadium is a multi-purpose stadium located in Barguna, Bangladesh.

== See also ==
- Stadiums in Bangladesh
- List of cricket grounds in Bangladesh
