= Jhalokati Stadium =

Coordinates: 22°39′30.54″N 90°11′55.55″E

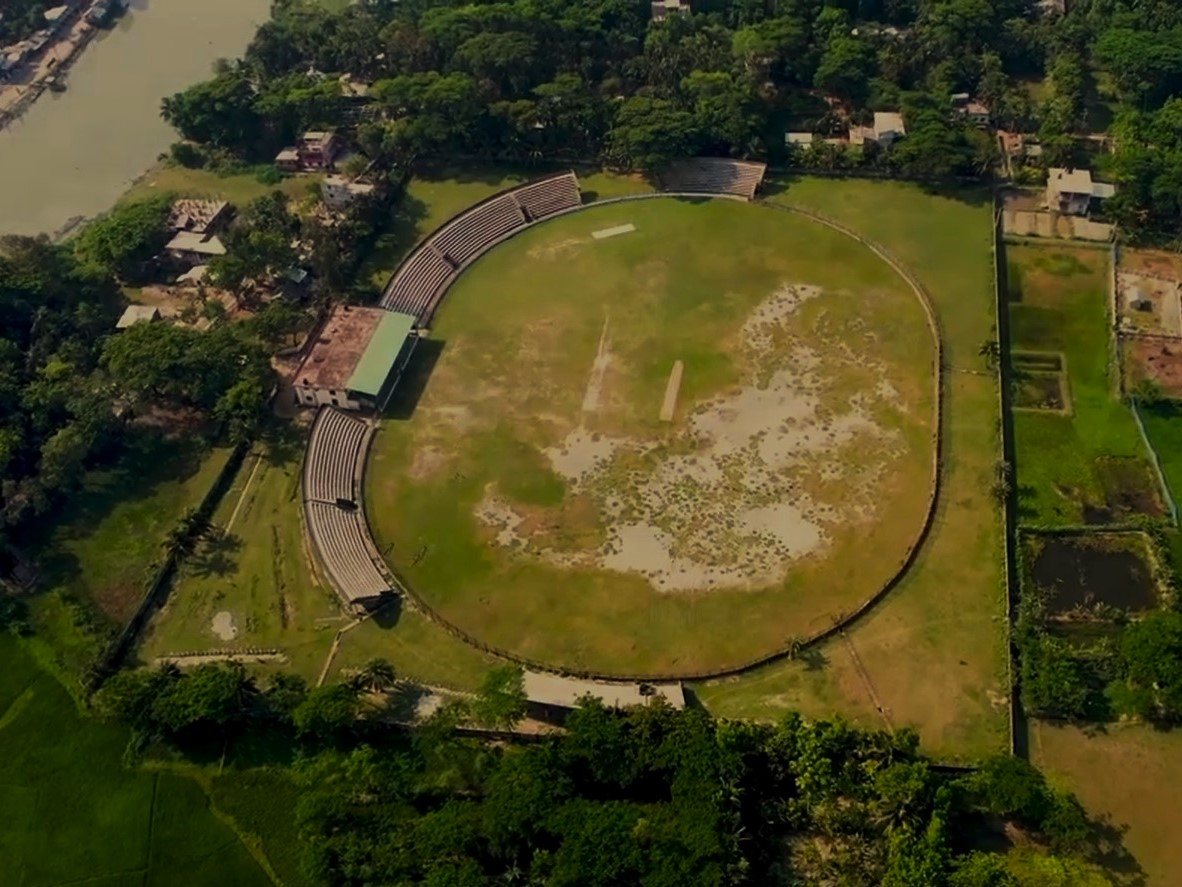
- Interactive map of Jhalokati Stadium
- Location: Jhalokati, Bangladesh
- Owner: National Sports Council
- Operator: National Sports Council
- Surface: Grass

Tenants
- Jhalokati Cricket Team; Jhalokati Football Team

Jhalokati Stadium is located by the Thana Rd, Jhalokati, Bangladesh.

== See also ==
- Stadiums in Bangladesh
- List of cricket grounds in Bangladesh
