= Naogaon Stadium =

Coordinates: 24°48′26.65″N 88°57′02.65″E

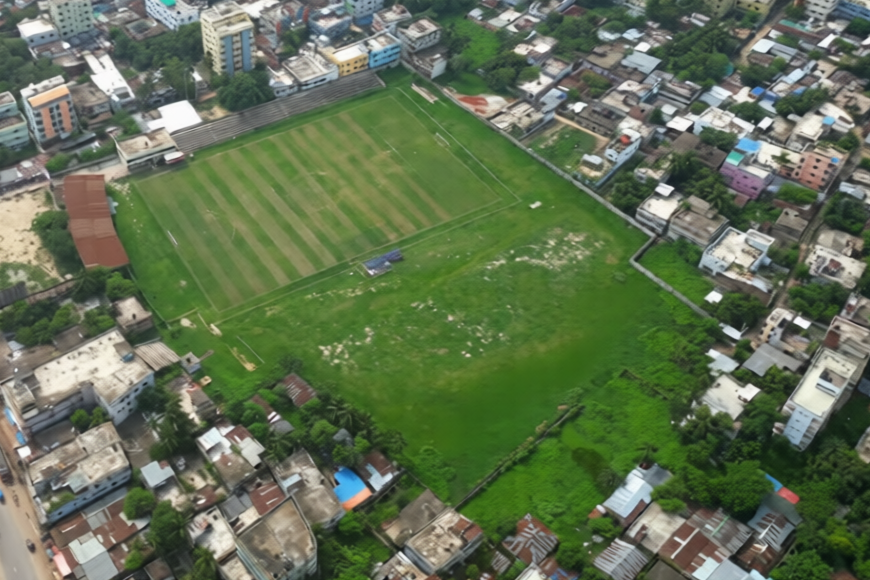
- Interactive map of Naogaon Stadium
- Location: Naogaon, Bangladesh
- Owner: National Sports Council
- Operator: National Sports Council
- Surface: Grass

Tenants
- Naogaon Cricket Team; Naogaon Football Team

Naogaon Stadium is located by the Intercity Bus Stand, Naogaon, Bangladesh.

== See also ==
- Stadiums in Bangladesh
- List of cricket grounds in Bangladesh
