= Chuadanga Stadium =

Stadium in Chuadanga, Bangladesh

- Interactive map of Chuadanga Stadium
- Location: Chuadanga Sadar Upazila, Bangladesh
- Coordinates: 23°37′32.08″N 88°51′34.93″E
- Owner: National Sports Council
- Operator: National Sports Council
- Capacity: 12000
- Surface: Grass

Tenants
- Chuadanga Cricket Team; Chuadanga Football Team

Chuadanga Stadium is an multi-purpose stadium located at Chuadanga Sadar Upazila, Chuadanga, Bangladesh. The stadium was built in 2012.

== See also ==
- Stadiums in Bangladesh
- List of cricket grounds in Bangladesh
