= Natore District Stadium =

Sports stadium in Bangladesh

Coordinates: 24°25′00.64″N 89°00′00.56″E

- Interactive map of Natore District Stadium
- Former names: Sankar Govinda Chowdhury Stadium (1999-2025)
- Location: Natore, Bangladesh
- Owner: National Sports Council
- Operator: National Sports Council
- Surface: Grass

Tenants
- Natore Cricket Team; Natore Football Team

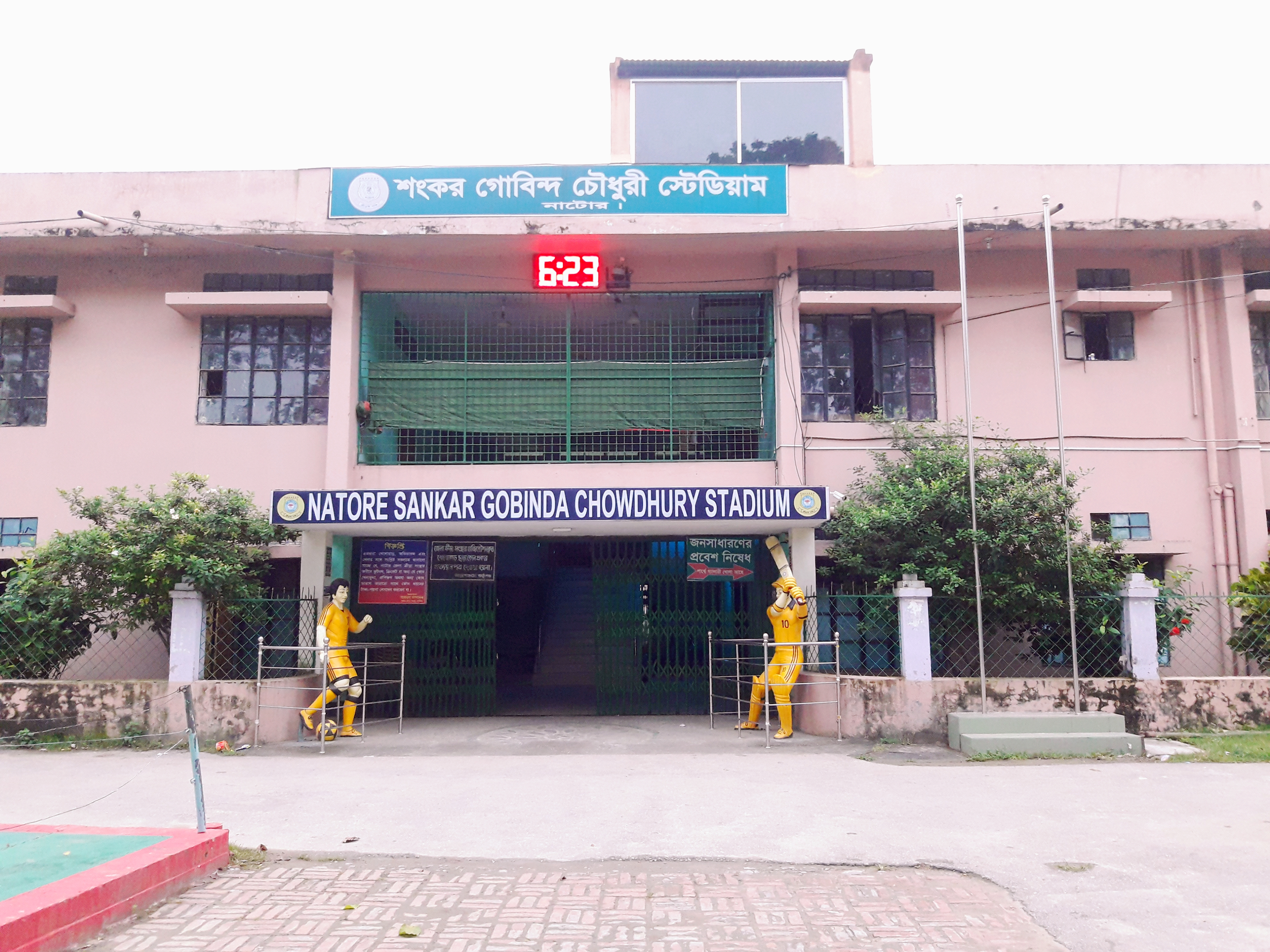
Natore Stadium.jpg

Natore District Stadium (Bengali: নাটোর জেলা স্টেডিয়াম) is the district stadium of Natore, Bangladesh. The stadium is located by the Children's Park of Natore municipality. Stadium is a multi-purpose venue, mainly used for national day parade, district level football completions. Venue was known by the name of Shankar Gobinda Choudhury, On March 23, 2025, the name of the facility was changed back to its original name 'District Stadium, Natore'.

== Hosted events ==
- The zonal host of 4th National Football League from June 25 to July 1 in 2004.
- The zonal host of 5th National Football League from September 15–26 in 2005.

== See also ==
- Stadiums in Bangladesh
- List of cricket grounds in Bangladesh
- Sheikh Kamal Stadium, Nilphamari
