= Shariatpur Stadium =

Sports venue in Bangladesh

Coordinates: 23°12′06.43″N 90°20′25.47″E

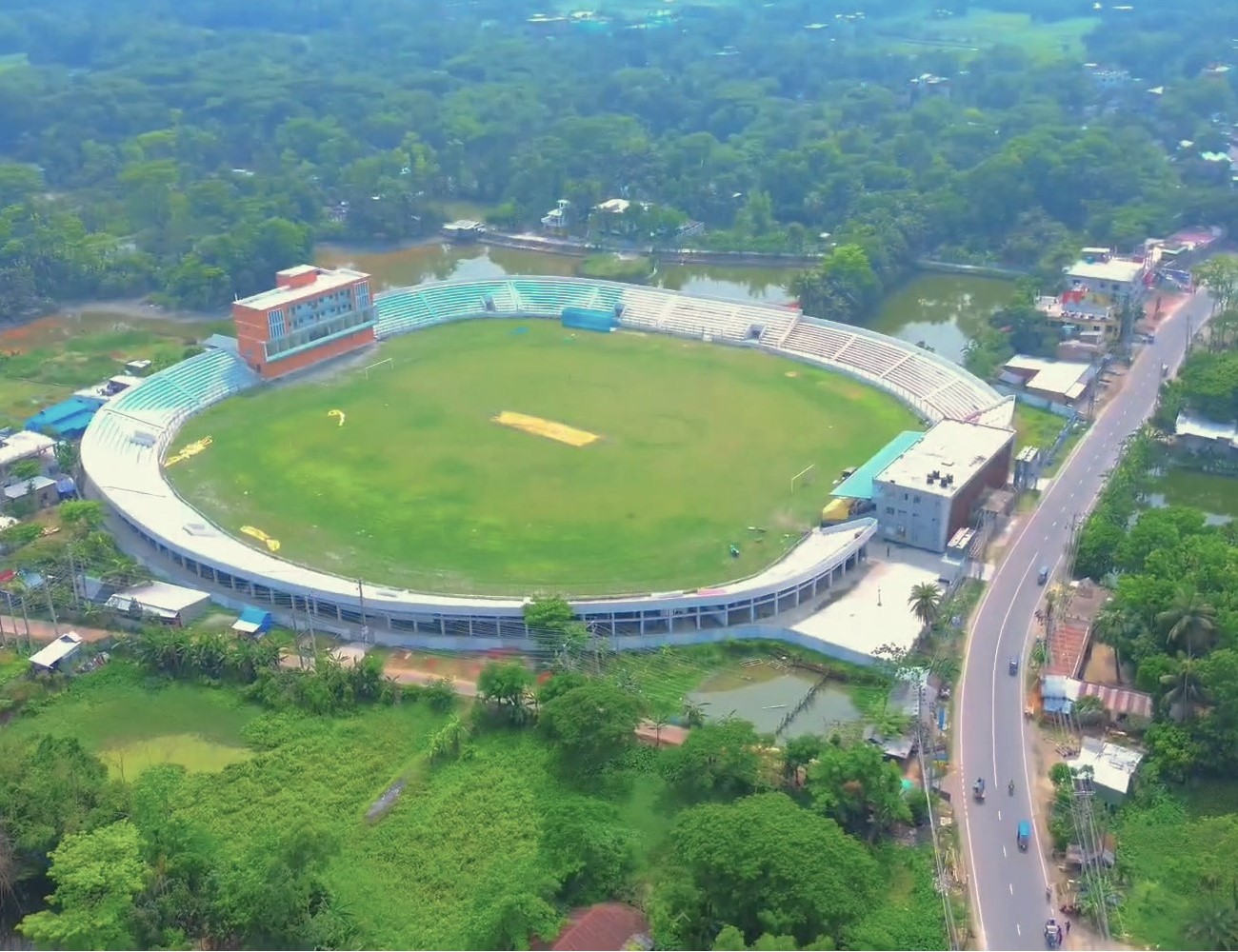
- Interactive map of Shariatpur Stadium
- Location: Shariatpur, Bangladesh
- Owner: National Sports Council
- Operator: National Sports Council
- Surface: Grass

Tenants
- Shariatpur Cricket Team; Shariatpur Football Team

Shariatpur Stadium is located by the Electricity Supply Substation, Shariatpur, Bangladesh.

== See also ==
- Stadiums in Bangladesh
- List of cricket grounds in Bangladesh
