= Jamalpur Stadium =

Stadium in Bangladesh

Coordinates: 24°56′11.19″N 89°56′04.39″E

- Interactive map of Jamalpur Stadium
- Location: Jamalpur, Bangladesh
- Owner: National Sports Council
- Operator: National Sports Council
- Capacity: 15,000
- Surface: Grass

Tenants
- Jamalpur Football Team; Jamalpur Cricket Team; Jamalpur Jagarani Club

Jamalpur Stadium also known as Beer Muktijoddha Advocate Abdul Hakim Stadium (Bangla: বীর মুক্তিযোদ্ধা এডভোকেট আব্দুল হাকিম স্টেডিয়াম) is located by the Jamalpur Police Lines, beside Jamalpur-Melandaha Road, Jamalpur, Bangladesh. The stadium is used mainly for national day parade, domestic football and cricket leagues and other cultural events.

== Hosting national sporting events ==
- The zonal host of 3rd National Football League from June 18 to 26 in 2003
- The zonal host of 5th National Football League from September 15 to 26 in 2005

== See also ==
- Stadiums in Bangladesh
- List of football stadiums in Bangladesh
- List of cricket grounds in Bangladesh
