= Bir Shrestha Hamidur Rahman Stadium =

Stadium in Bangladesh

Coordinates: 23°32′33.45″N 89°10′34.78″E

- Interactive map of Bir Shrestha Hamidur Rahman Stadium
- Location: Jhenaidah, Bangladesh
- Owner: National Sports Council
- Operator: National Sports Council
- Surface: Grass

Tenants
- Jhenaidah Football Team; Jhenaidah Mohamedan SC

Bir Shrestha Hamidur Rahman Stadium (Bangla: বীর শ্রেষ্ঠ হামিদুর রহমান স্টেডিয়াম) is district stadium of Jhenaidah, Bangladesh. The stadium is located by the Pria Cinema Hall of Jhenaidah municipality. The stadium is mostly used for national day parade and district level football and cricket leagues.

== Hosting National Sporting Event ==
The venue was the zonal host of 3rd National Football League from June 18- July 1 in 2003.

== See also ==
- Stadiums in Bangladesh
- List of cricket grounds in Bangladesh
- Sheikh Kamal International Stadium, Cox's Bazar
- Sheikh Kamal International Stadium, Gopalganj
- Sport in Bangladesh
