= Nur Mohammad Stadium =

Coordinates: 23°10′29.34″N 89°30′04.09″E

- Interactive map of Nur Mohammad Stadium
- Location: Narail, Bangladesh
- Owner: National Sports Council
- Operator: National Sports Council
- Surface: Grass

Tenant
- Narail Football Team

Nur Mohammad Stadium is located by the Police Super Office, Narail, Bangladesh.

== See also ==
- Stadiums in Bangladesh
- List of cricket grounds in Bangladesh
