= Dinajpur Stadium =

Stadium in Dinajpur, Bangladesh

- Interactive map of Dinajpur Stadium
- Location: Dinajpur, Bangladesh
- Coordinates: 25°36′38.80″N 88°37′58.97″E
- Owner: National Sports Council
- Operator: National Sports Council
- Surface: Grass
- Field size: 175 m x 165 m (Oval)

Tenants
- Dinajpur Cricket Team; Dinajpur Football Team

Dinajpur Stadium is a multi-purpose stadium in Dinajpur, Bangladesh.

== See also ==
- Stadiums in Bangladesh
- List of cricket grounds in Bangladesh
