= Khagrachhari Stadium =

Stadium in Khagrachhari, Chattogram Division, Bangladesh

Coordinates: 23°07′24.91″N 91°58′03.41″E

- Interactive map of Khagrachhari Stadium
- Location: Khagrachhari, Bangladesh
- Owner: National Sports Council
- Operator: National Sports Council
- Surface: Grass

Tenants
- Khagrachhari Football Team

Khagrachhari Stadium is located by the Khagrachhari-Panchhari Rd, Khagrachhari, Bangladesh.

== See also ==
- Stadiums in Bangladesh
- List of cricket grounds in Bangladesh
- Sport in Bangladesh
- Football in Bangladesh
- Cricket in Bangladesh
