= Shaeed Samsuddin Stadium =

Multi-sport stadium in Sirajganj, Bangladesh

Coordinates: 24°27′20.66″N 89°42′39.32″E

Sirajganj Stadium
- Interactive map of Sirajganj Stadium
- Location: Sirajganj, Bangladesh
- Owner: National Sports Council
- Operator: National Sports Council
- Surface: Grass

Tenants
- Sirajganj Cricket Team; Sirajganj Football Team

Sirajganj Stadium is a multi-sport stadium located by the Medical Assistant Training School in Sirajganj, Bangladesh.

== See also ==
- Stadiums in Bangladesh
- List of cricket grounds in Bangladesh
