= Bir Muktijoddha Sirajul Islam Stadium =

Coordinates: 26°20′26.44″N 88°33′37.73″E

- Interactive map of Bir Muktijoddha Sirajul Islam Stadium
- Location: Stadium Road, Panchagarh, Bangladesh
- Owner: National Sports Council
- Operator: National Sports Council
- Capacity: 1000+
- Surface: Grass

Construction
- Opened: 9-6

Tenants
- Panchagarh Cricket Team; Panchagarh Football Team

Bir Muktijoddha Sirajul Islam Stadium (Bengali: বীর মুক্তিযোদ্ধা সিরাজুল ইসলাম স্টেডিয়াম) is located by the Panchagarh Sadar Upazila Engineer Office in Panchagarh, Bangladesh.

== See also ==
- Stadiums in Bangladesh
- List of cricket grounds in Bangladesh
