= Shah Abdul Hamid Stadium =

Stadium in Bangladesh

- Interactive map of Shah Abdul Hamid Stadium
- Location: Gaibandha, Bangladesh
- Coordinates: 25°19′28.95″N 89°32′38.68″E
- Owner: National Sports Council
- Operator: National Sports Council
- Surface: Grass
- Field size: 180 m x 115 m (Rectangular)

Tenants
- Gaibandha Cricket Team; Gaibandha Football Team

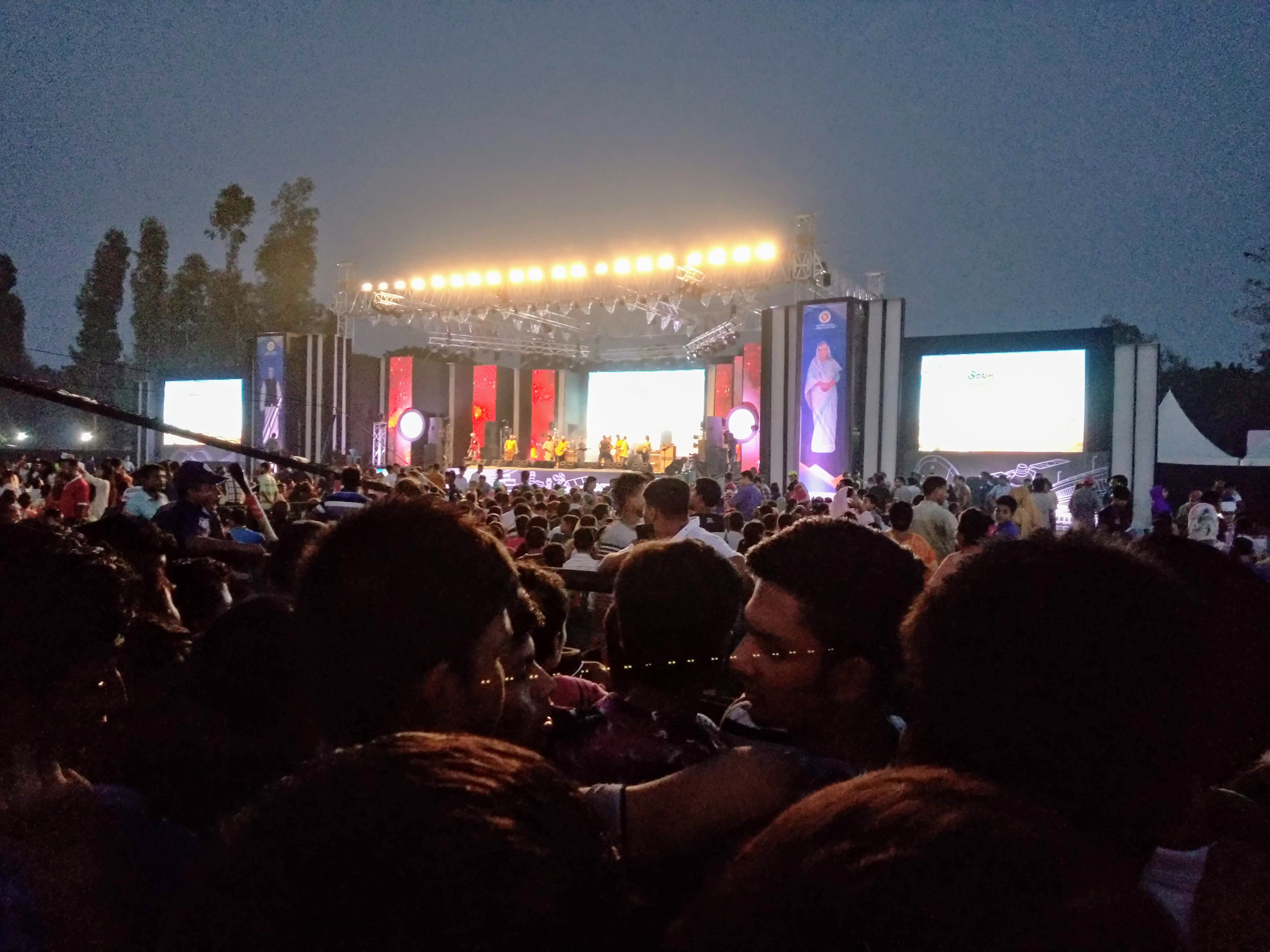
Concert in 2018

Shah Abdul Hamid Stadium is located by the Gaibandha Koborosthan, Gaibandha, Bangladesh.

== See also ==
- Stadiums in Bangladesh
- List of cricket grounds in Bangladesh
