= Shaheed Abu Sayeed Stadium =

Sports venue in Rangpur, Bangladesh

- শহীদ আবু সাঈদ স্টেডিয়াম
- From the new building of Rangpur Government College to Rangpur Stadium
- Interactive map of Shaheed Abu Sayeed Stadium
- Address: Hanumatola; Rangpur; Bangladesh
- Location: Police Lines Road, Rangpur, Bangladesh
- Coordinates: 25°45′33.12″N 89°14′58.95″E
- Owner: National Sports Council
- Operator: National Sports Council
- Capacity: 25,000
- Surface: Grass (Oval)
- Field size: 188 m x 138 m

Tenants
- Bangladesh national cricket team Rangpur Riders

Shaheed Abu Sayeed Stadium (Bengali: শহীদ আবু সাঈদ স্টেডিয়াম) commonly knowns as Rangpur Stadium is a cricket and football ground behind Police Lines School and College, Rangpur in the city of Rangpur, Bangladesh. It is on the north side of Rangpur Cricket Garden ‍and Rangpur Government College. It has a capacity of 25,000.

== History ==
Planning for a stadium in Rangpur began in 1963. In a series of false starts, three foundation stones were laid at three different sites. Finally, 13 acres in the Hanumatola area were acquired for the project. By the middle of May 1968, preliminary work had begun there. Quazi Azhar Ali, deputy commissioner, Rangpur, and chairman of the Stadium Committee, laid a fourth foundation stone on 12 September 1968.

The provincial government contributed 1 million Pakistani rupees ($210,000 as of 1968), while the central government put in Rs 40,000, and public contributions raised Rs 24,000. Construction was projected to cost Rs 1.75 million over 10 years. The first phase budgeted Rs 350,000 to construct a pavilion for spectators. Building proceeded in fits and starts due to shortages of materials and funds.

The partly finished stadium was inaugurated on 16 June 1969. In an exhibition football match that day, Rangpur XI defeated EPG Press XI, Dacca, by four goals to nil.

The stadium is owned by the National Sports Council. The Rangpur District Sports Association manages it and is responsible for maintenance. Long neglected, part of the stadium was derelict by 2015. The Daily Star described it in 2020 as abandoned and overgrown, with large holes in the field.

In 2019, the Ministry of Youth and Sports allocated 411.8 million Bangladeshi taka ($4.9 million as of 2019) for improvements. The work was finished in November 2022. On 28 May 2022, the stadium was renamed Sheikh Russell Stadium.

On 8 September 2025, the stadium was renamed again to Shaheed Abu Sayeed Stadium.

== See also ==
- Stadiums in Bangladesh
- List of football stadiums in Bangladesh
- List of cricket grounds in Bangladesh
