= Saidpur Stadium =

Coordinates: 25°46′30.36″N 88°53′11.50″E

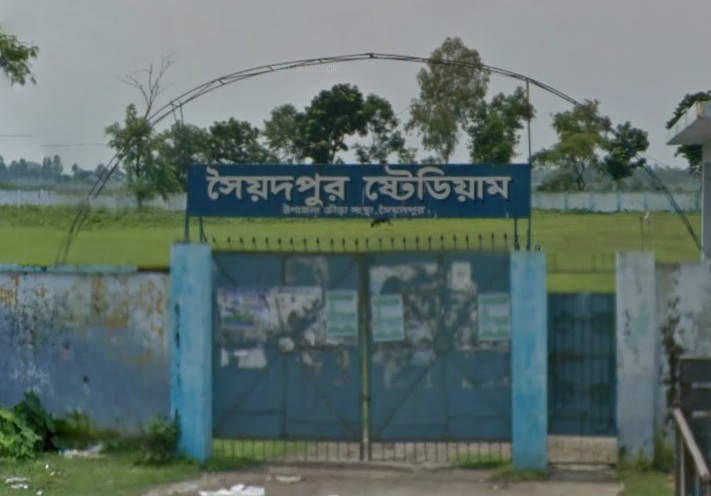
- Interactive map of Saidpur Stadium
- Location: Saidpur, Nilphamari, Bangladesh
- Surface: Grass

Tenants
- Saidpur Cricket team, Saidpur Football team

Saidpur Stadium is located by the Saidpur Hospital, Saidpur, Nilphamari, Bangladesh.

== See also ==
- Stadiums in Bangladesh
- List of cricket grounds in Bangladesh
