= Chapai Nawabganj Stadium =

Sports venue in Nawabganj, Bangladesh

Coordinates: 24°35′38.77″N 88°15′24.86″E

- Interactive map of Chapai Nawabganj Stadium
- Location: Nawabganj, Bangladesh
- Owner: National Sports Council
- Operator: National Sports Council
- Surface: Grass

Tenants
- Chapai Nawabganj Cricket Team; Chapai Nawabganj Football Team

Chapai Nawabganj Stadium is located by the PTI Bishwa Rd, Nawabganj, Bangladesh.

== See also ==
- Stadiums in Bangladesh
- List of cricket grounds in Bangladesh
