= Lakshmipur Stadium =

Cricket stadium in Bangladesh

- Interactive map of Lakshmipur Stadium
- Address: Lakshmipur; Bangladesh
- Coordinates: 22°55′58″N 90°50′24″E
- Owner: National Sports Council
- Operator: National Sports Council
- Surface: Grass

Tenants
- Lakshmipur Cricket Team; Lakshmipur Football Team; Chaser Football Club

Lakshmipur Stadium is located on the south side of Stadium Road, Lakshmipur, Bangladesh.

== See also ==
- Stadiums in Bangladesh
- List of cricket grounds in Bangladesh
