= Thakurgaon Stadium =

Coordinates: 26°01′35.22″N 88°28′30.38″E

- Interactive map of Thakurgaon Stadium
- Location: Thakurgaon, Bangladesh
- Owner: National Sports Council
- Operator: National Sports Council
- Surface: Grass

Tenants
- Thakurgaon Cricket Team; Thakurgaon Football Team

Thakurgaon Stadium is located by the Thakurgaon Inter District Bus Terminal, Thakurgaon, Bangladesh.

== See also ==
- Stadiums in Bangladesh
- List of cricket grounds in Bangladesh
