= Sunamganj Stadium =

Coordinates: 25°04′11.77″N 91°24′07.10″E

Sunamganj District Stadium
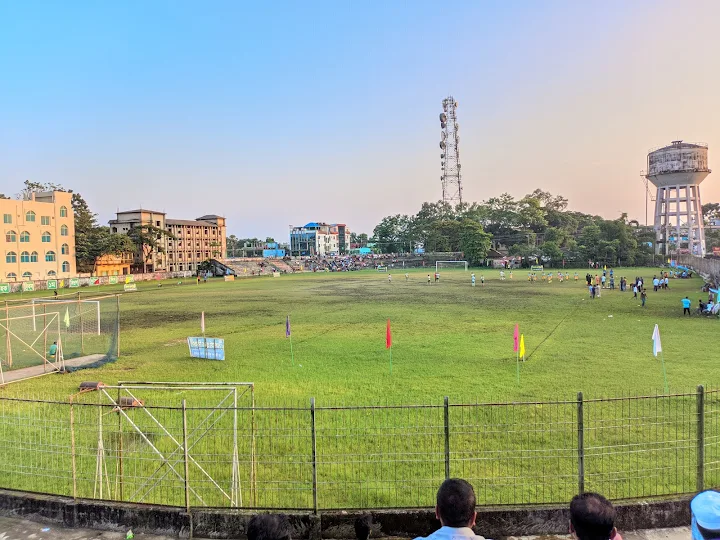
- Interactive map of Sunamganj District Stadium
- Location: Sunamganj, Bangladesh
- Owner: National Sports Council
- Operator: National Sports Council
- Surface: Grass

Tenants
- Sunamganj Football Team, Sunamganj District Cricket Team, Teenager Club Sunamganj

Sunamganj Stadium (Also known as Sunamganj District Stadium, in Bengali সুনামগঞ্জ জেলা স্টেডিয়াম) is a local football and cricket stadium in Sunamganj city of Bangladesh.

== See also ==
- Stadiums in Bangladesh
- List of cricket grounds in Bangladesh
