= Bir Muktijoddha Asaduzzaman Stadium =

Sports venue in Bangladesh

Coordinates: 23°29′01.75″N 89°24′46.42″E

Bir Muktijoddha Asasuzzaman Stadium
- Interactive map of Bir Muktijoddha Asasuzzaman Stadium
- Location: Magura, Bangladesh
- Owner: National Sports Council
- Operator: National Sports Council
- Surface: Grass

Tenants
- Magura Cricket Team; Magura Football Team

Bir Muktijoddha Asaduzzaman Stadium is located in Magura, Bangladesh. It is the home ground of Magura District Cricket Team & Magura District Football Team.

== See also ==
- Stadiums in Bangladesh
- List of cricket grounds in Bangladesh
