= Rangamati Stadium =

Football stadium in Rangamati, Bangladesh

Coordinates: 22°39′36.09″N 92°10′07.40″E

- Interactive map of Rangamati Stadium
- Location: Rangamati, Bangladesh
- Owner: National Sports Council
- Operator: National Sports Council
- Capacity: 6,000
- Surface: Grass

Construction
- Built: 1980
- Renovated: 2014–2019

Tenants
- Rangamati Football Team; Rangamati Mohamedan SC

Rangamati Stadium is football stadium, located by the Hospital Rd, Rangamati, Bangladesh. In 2012, National Sports Council of Bangladesh recommended changing the name of Rangamati stadium to Ching Lah Mong Chowdhury Murruy Rangamati Stadium, to commemorat the late footballer Chinghla Mong Chowdhury Mari. The Stadium has been renamed to Rangamati Chinglah Moung Chowdhury (Mari) Stadium.

== Hosting National Sporting Event ==
The venue was the zonal host of 5th National Football League from September 15–26 in 2005.

== See also ==
- Stadiums in Bangladesh
- List of football stadiums in Bangladesh
- Football in Bangladesh
