= Lalmonirhat Stadium =

- Interactive map of Lalmonirhat Stadium
- Address: Lalmonirhat; Bangladesh
- Coordinates: 25°54′32″N 89°26′15″E
- Owner: National Sports Council
- Operator: National Sports Council
- Surface: Grass

Tenants
- Lalmonirhat Cricket Team; Lalmonirhat Football Team

Lalmonirhat Stadium is located by the Lalmonirhat Jail in Lalmonirhat, Bangladesh.

== See also ==
- Stadiums in Bangladesh
- List of cricket grounds in Bangladesh
