= Habiganj Jalal Stadium =

- Interactive map of Habiganj Jalal Stadium
- Location: Press Club Road, Habiganj, Bangladesh
- Coordinates: 24°22′28.39″N 91°24′50.56″E
- Owner: National Sports Council
- Operator: National Sports Council
- Capacity: 11,000
- Field size: 115 × 90 m (377 × 295 ft)
- Field shape: Rectangular

Tenant
- Habiganj Football Team

Habiganj Jalal Stadium (Bengali: হবিগঞ্জ জালাল স্টেডিয়াম) is a multi-purpose stadium situated in Habiganj, in northeastern Bangladesh. It was built in 1956/1957 and is the first stadium of Habiganj District. The stadium was named after Jalal, the erstwhile administrator of Habiganj subdivision. The stadium has been used for cricket, football and kabaddi.

== See also ==
- Stadiums in Bangladesh
- List of football stadiums in Bangladesh
- List of cricket grounds in Bangladesh
