= Joypurhat Stadium =

Coordinates: 25°06′19.48″N 89°01′18.07″E

- Interactive map of Joypurhat Stadium
- Location: Joypurhat, Bangladesh
- Owner: National Sports Council
- Operator: National Sports Council
- Capacity: 1,000+
- Surface: Grass

Tenant
- Joypurhat Football Team

Joypurhat Stadium is situated at Master Para, Joypurhat, Bangladesh.

== See also ==
- Stadiums in Bangladesh
- List of cricket grounds in Bangladesh
