= Mohammad Aminuddin =

Bangladeshi lawyer (1921–1971)

Mohammad Aminuddin (1921-1971) was a Bangladeshi lawyer, who was killed in the Bangladesh Liberation war and is considered a martyr in Bangladesh.

== Early life ==
Aminuddin was born in 1921 in Gouripur, Rajshahi District, Bengal Presidency, British Raj. He completed his high school in Khanjanpur Mission High School in 1938 and his Bachelor of Arts from Rajshahi Government College in 1942. He joined as an Inspector in Kolkata's Bengal Civil Supplies Department. In 1950 he completed his law degree from the University of Dhaka and started his legal practice in Dhaka.

== Career ==
Aminuddin moved to Pabna and joined the Pabna District Bar Association in 1952. He Joined Awami League, political party next year. He campaigned against General Ayub Khan and was imprisoned by the government. He was elected general secretary of Pabna District Bar Association in 1970. He was elected to the East Pakistan Provincial assembly in 1970 from Awami League. He was involved in the non-cooperation movement in the area and was the convener of Pabna Zilla Mukti Sangram Parishad.

== Death and legacy ==
Aminuddin was arrested on 26 March 1971 by members of Pakistan Army from Pabna. Pakistan army executed him on 29 March 1971. Bangladesh Post Office released commemorative stamps with his pictures on 14 December 1993. In 2001 he was awarded the Independence Day Award by the government of Bangladesh in 2001. He was a founder of Pabna Law college, which was renamed to Shaheed Aminuddin Law College after him.

Pabna stadium is posthumously named after him. After the fall of the Sheikh Hasina led Awami League government, the stadium renamed to 'Pabna District Stadium' in March 23, 2025 for brief time. Later, on May 28 of the same year, it reinstated its previous name.
