= Niaz Mohammad Stadium =

Sports venue in Brahmanbaria, Bangladesh

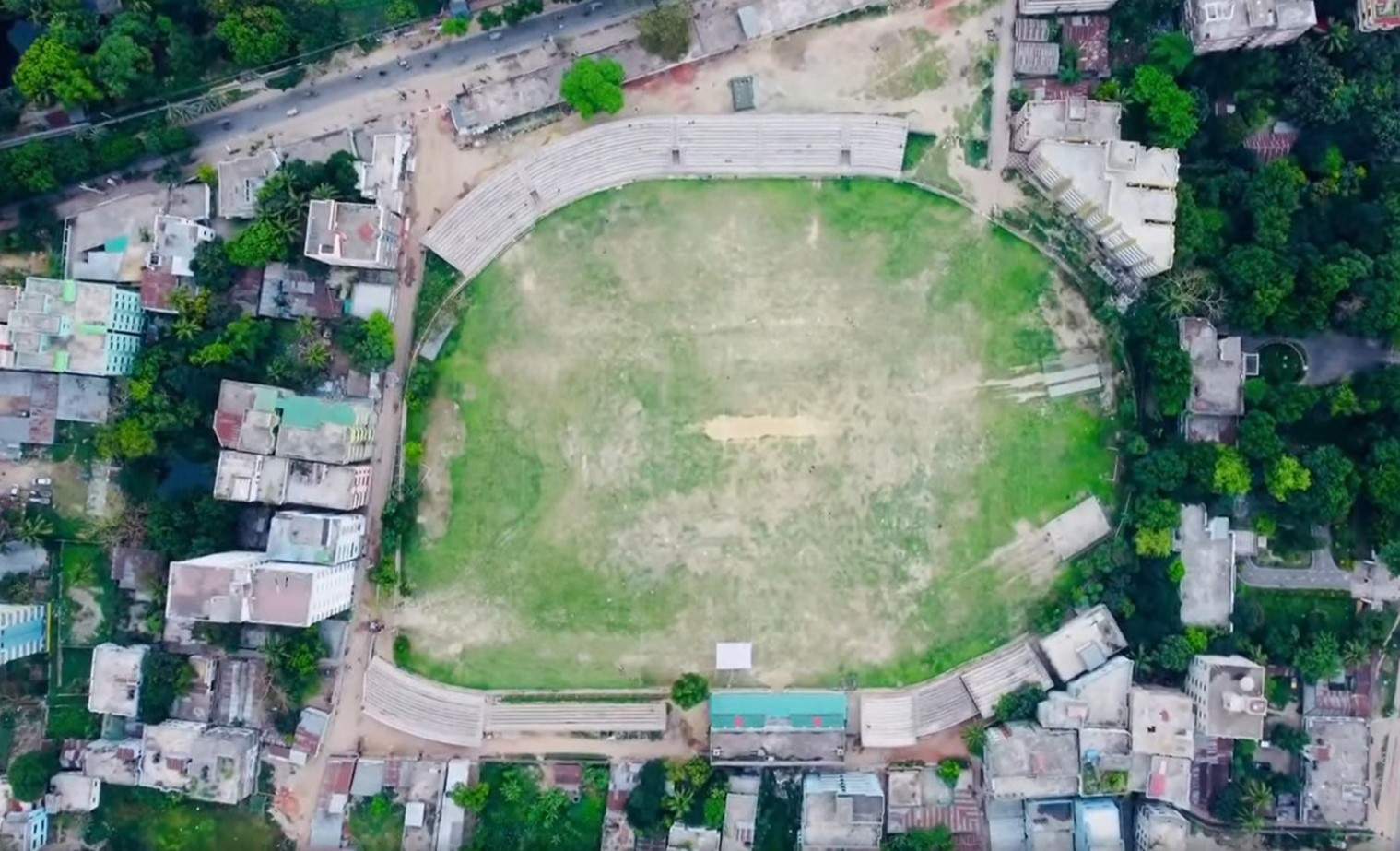
- Niaz Mohammad Stadium Gallery
- Interactive map of Niaz Mohammad Stadium
- Location: Kautali, Brahmanbaria, Bangladesh
- Coordinates: 23°57′33.87″N 91°06′47.95″E
- Owner: National Sports Council
- Operator: National Sports Council
- Surface: Grass
- Scoreboard: Manual Board & Electronic Board
- Field size: 175 × 122 m (574 × 400 ft)
- Field shape: Oval

Construction
- Built: 1934
- Opened: 1934

Tenant
- Brahmanbaria District football team

Niaz Mohammad Stadium (also known as Brahmanbaria District Stadium) is a multi-purpose stadium in Brahmanbaria, Bangladesh. It is primarily used for football and cricket, as well as holiday events.

== See also ==
- Stadiums in Bangladesh
- List of football stadiums in Bangladesh
- List of cricket grounds in Bangladesh

== First Class Cricket ==
- 9 December 1999: Chittagong Division v Rajshahi Division (1999-00 National Cricket League)
