= Pabna Stadium =

Coordinates: 24°00′20.71″N 89°13′40.49″E

- Interactive map of Pabna Stadium
- Location: Pabna, Bangladesh
- Owner: National Sports Council
- Operator: National Sports Council
- Surface: Grass

Tenants
- Pabna Cricket Team; Pabna Football Team

Pabna Stadium is located by the Circuit House, Pabna, Bangladesh.

== See also ==
- Stadiums in Bangladesh
- List of cricket grounds in Bangladesh
