= Rajbari District Stadium =

District level stadium of Bangladesh

- রাজবাড়ী জেলা স্টেডিয়াম
- Interactive map of Rajbari District Stadium
- Former names: Kazi Hedayet Hossain Stadium
- Address: Boropool, Rajbari Municipality; Bangladesh
- Coordinates: 23°45′12.40″N 89°38′31.70″E
- Owner: National Sports Council
- Operator: Goalanda Mahakuma Sports Association (1964 - 1984); Rajbari District Sports Association (1984 - present)
- Surface: Natural turf
- Designation: District level
- Acreage: 13 Acres
- Current use: Multiple

Construction
- Built: 1964
- Opened: 1964
- Renovated: 1993-1994; 2003-2004

Tenant
- Rajbari District Sports Association

Rajbari District Stadium, established in 1964, is a district-level stadium in Bangladesh. The facility is located in the Baropul area of Rajbari Municipality in Rajbari District, beside the Rajbari-Kushtia Regional Highway. Like most stadiums in Bangladesh, this sports facility is under the affiliation of the National Sports Council and is overseen by the local Rajbari District Sports Association. It is the only stadium in the district and, alongside the Railway Ground and Government College Ground, serves as the main venue for municipal sports events. The stadium is used as a host ground for various district and sub-district sports, age-based and educational institution sports competitions, talent searches, and local league matches organized by the district sports association. Additionally, it serves as the primary venue for state programs during national days at the district level in Bangladesh.

== History ==
In 1964, the stadium was opened for sports in Rajbari Municipality, the administrative center of Goalanda Mahakuma, after land acquisition and partial gallery construction. After 1 March 1984, following the administrative conversion of Goalanda Mahakuma into Rajbari District, its official name was made 'Rajbari District Stadium'. The local sports organizer Kazi Hedayet Hossain supervised its construction until his death. In posthumous honor, the venue was named 'Kazi Hedayet Hossain Stadium'. It was renovated twice in 1993-1994 and 2003-2004 fiscal years. During the global COVID-19 pandemic in Bangladesh, the district administration set up a temporary wholesale market here, maintaining social distancing and restrictions on gatherings.

== Infrastructure ==
Rajbari District Stadium is a sports facility built on 13 acres of land. It includes a partially seated gallery for spectators, dressing rooms for players, and is part of the stadium's primary infrastructure. Additionally, the building once housed the office of the District Women's Sports Association, which is now abandoned.

== Usage ==
This is a venue for events organized regularly under the initiative of the Rajbari District Administration and the Sports Association, including football, cricket, rural sports, and school/college-based competitions. Local players from the district practice here.

Various association football competitions take place here. Among them are the regular football competitions organized by the local district administration, such as the Deputy Commissioner's Gold Cup, the First Division Football League organized by the Bangladesh Football Federation and the District Sports Association. In 2017, it served as the venue for the JFA Under-14 Women's National Football Championship, in 2020 for the Under-17 National Gold Cup, and in 2025 it was a regional venue for the National Championship Football.

Beyond sports events, it is also the main venue for the state ceremonies of Bangladesh's national days, such as Independence Day and Victory Day, including national flag hoisting, parades, and physical exercise displays by school and college students.
