= Shaheed Chandu Stadium =

Cricket stadium

Coordinates: 24°50′22.62″N 89°21′54.81″E

Shaheed Chandu Stadium শহীদ চান্দু স্টেডিয়াম
- Bogura Cricket Stadium
- Interactive map of Shaheed Chandu Stadium শহীদ চান্দু স্টেডিয়াম

Ground information
- Location: Khander, Bogura
- Country: Bangladesh
- Establishment: 2002
- Capacity: 18,000
- Owner: Rajshahi Division
- Operator: Bangladesh, Rajshahi Division
- Tenants: Bangladesh cricket team, Duronto Rajshahi, Rangpur Riders

International information
- Only men's Test: 8 Mar - 11 Mar 2006: Bangladesh v Sri Lanka
- First men's ODI: 20 Feb 2006: Bangladesh v Sri Lanka
- Last men's ODI: 5 Dec 2006: Bangladesh v Zimbabwe
- Only women's ODI: 7 February 2009: Pakistan v Sri Lanka
- As of 1 September 2020; Source: Shaheed Chandu Stadium, Cricinfo

Shaheed Chandu Stadium (Bengali: শহীদ চান্দু স্টেডিয়াম), previously known as Bogura Cricket Stadium or Bogura Stadium, is a stadium located in the northwestern side of Bogura district, Bangladesh.

== History ==
The venue got its first international exposure when it hosted three group stage matches of 2004 Under-19 Cricket World Cup.

It became a test cricket venue on 8 March 2006, when it hosted a Test match between Sri Lanka and Bangladesh. It has a total capacity of 18,000. The ground has a field dimensions of 175m x 140m. The last international match played here was between Bangladesh and Zimbabwe in 2006, since then it has hosted domestic cricket .

== Stats ==
Till 2006 the venue has hosted

- Test Matches - 1
- One Day International - 5
- T20I - 0

== International match hosting problem ==
The venue hosted its last international match in 2006. Transportation problems, player's accommodation problems, are a few of problems for which Bangladesh Cricket Board preclude matches being hosted at the venue. Although the city has a domestic airport, it is maintained by the Bangladesh Air Force and needs prior approval for operations which makes it difficult to host international matches. The Bangladesh Cricket Board and the Government of Bangladesh are trying to solve problems related to hosting so that the venue can come back to host international matches as soon as possible.

== See also ==
- List of international five-wicket hauls at Shaheed Chandu Stadium
- Stadiums in Bangladesh
- List of Test cricket grounds
- One-Test wonder
- List of international cricket grounds in Bangladesh
