= Chengshan Stadium =

Sports venue in Weihai, China

Coordinates: 37°31′17″N 122°04′56″E

The Weihai City Commercial Bank Stadium, formerly known as the Gubo Chengshan Stadium (Simplified Chinese: 成山体育场) (also known as the Weihai Stadium) (Simplified Chinese: 威海市体育场) is a multi-use stadium in Weihai, China. It is currently used mostly for football matches and athletics events. It hosts the home games of Weihai Aisen. The stadium has a capacity of 31,800 people and opened in March 2002. It is located on 78 Wenhua Middle Road, Weihai.
