= Gopalganj International Cricket Stadium =

Cricket stadium in Gopalganj, Bangladesh

- গোপালগঞ্জ আন্তর্জাতিক ক্রিকেট স্টেডিয়াম
- Interactive map of Gopalganj International Cricket Stadium
- Former names: Sheikh Kamal International Cricket Stadium
- Location: Gopalganj, Bangladesh
- Coordinates: 23°00′36.23″N 89°49′39.06″E
- Owner: National Sports Council
- Operator: National Sports Council
- Capacity: 28,000
- Surface: Grass
- Field size: 178 × 138 m (584 × 453 ft)
- Field shape: Oval
- Acreage: 10 acres (4.0 ha; 440,000 sq ft)

Construction
- Groundbreaking: 1996
- Built: 1999
- Opened: 1999
- Renovated: 2008
- Expanded: 2013

Tenant
- Bangladesh national cricket team

Gopalganj International Cricket Stadium (Bengali: গোপালগঞ্জ আন্তর্জাতিক ক্রিকেট স্টেডিয়াম, formerly known as Sheikh Kamal International Cricket Stadium) is located beside the Madhumati River, Gopalganj, Bangladesh. Various types of sports events of Gopalganj district take place here. This stadium was redeveloped for the 2014 ICC World Twenty20. The stadium has an underground water drainage system, fully roofed gallery, giant screen, trivision side screen, floodlights and beautiful press box. The stadium complex includes a swimming pool, big gymnasium, separate power station, car parking facility and sports complex for women.

== See also ==
- List of stadiums in Bangladesh
- List of cricket grounds in Bangladesh
- Gopalganj Old Stadium
- Cox's Bazar International Cricket Stadium
