= 2005–06 National Football League (Bangladesh) =

2005–06 Nitol-Tata National Football League
Tournament details
- Country: Bangladesh
- Venue(s): 6
- Dates: 16 September 2005 – 8 January 2006
- Teams: 52

Final positions
- Champions: Dhaka Mohammedan (2nd title)
- Runners-up: Dhaka Abahani

Tournament statistics
- Matches played: 76
- Goals scored: 189 (2.49 per match)

The 2005-06 Nitol-Tata National Football League was the 5th and final season of the annual domestic national football league hosted by the Bangladesh Football Federation. A total of 52 participants including 5 services teams across the country competed for the tournament.

Mohammedan SC were crowned the champions after defeating Abahani Limited Dhaka 2–0 on 8 January 2006 in Dhaka.

== Overview ==
Mohammedan SC won the league.

== First stage ==
Pos	Team	Pld	W	D	L	GF	GA	GD	Pts	Qualification
1	Abahani Limited (Dhaka)	5	3	2	0	9	3	+6	11	Playoff
2	Brothers Union	5	2	3	0	3	2	+1	9	Playoff
3	Mohammedan SC	5	2	2	1	8	1	+7	8	Playoff
4	Muktijoddha SKC	5	2	2	1	9	3	+6	8	Playoff
5	Bangladesh Army	5	1	0	4	0	11	−11	3	
6	Naba Nabin Shamabesh	5	0	1	4	4	13	−9	1	

Source: rsssf.com

=== Super Six Round ===
26 December 2005
15:00 UTC+6:00

Brothers Union	0-0	Dhaka Mohammedan

Bangabandhu National Stadium, Dhaka

27 December 2005
15:00 UTC+6:00

Muktijoddha SKC	5-0	Nobanabin Somabesh

Bangabandhu National Stadium, Dhaka

28 December 2005
15:00 UTC+6:00

Dhaka Abahani	1-0	Bangladesh Army

Bangabandhu National Stadium, Dhaka

29 December 2005
15:00 UTC+6:00

Brothers Union	1-0	Muktijoddha SKC

Bangabandhu National Stadium, Dhaka

30 December 2005
15:00 UTC+6:00

Dhaka Abahani	6-1	Nobanabin Somabesh

Bangabandhu National Stadium, Dhaka

31 December 2005
15:00 UTC+6:00

Dhaka Mohammedan	6-0	Bangladesh Army

Bangabandhu National Stadium, Dhaka

1 January 2006
15:00 UTC+6:00

Dhaka Abahani	2-2	Brothers Union

Bangabandhu National Stadium, Dhaka

2 January 2006
15:00 UTC+6:00

Dhaka Mohammedan	2-1	Nobanabin Somabesh

Bangabandhu National Stadium, Dhaka

3 January 2006
15:00 UTC+6:00

Muktijoddha SKC	4-0	Bangladesh Army

Bangabandhu National Stadium, Dhaka

=== Semi-finals ===
5 January 2006
15:00 UTC+6:00

Dhaka Abahani	2-1	Muktijoddha SKC

Bangabandhu National Stadium, Dhaka

6 January 2006
15:00 UTC+6:00

Dhaka Mohammedan	1-0	Brothers Union

Bangabandhu National Stadium, Dhaka

=== Final ===
8 January 2006
15:00 UTC+6:00

Dhaka Mohammedan	2-0	Dhaka Abahani

Bangabandhu National Stadium, Dhaka
