= List of cricket grounds in Bangladesh =

This is a list of cricket grounds in Bangladesh. The stadiums included in this list have held first-class, List-A and Twenty20 matches. Additionally, some have hosted Test matches, One Day Internationals and Twenty20 Internationals.

== International contribution by Bangladesh grounds ==
Listed in order of match first used for international match

Stadium	City	Capacity	First used	Tests	ODIs	T20Is	Image
District Stadium, Chattogram	Chattogram	40,000	1988	8	10	0	
National Stadium, Dhaka	Dhaka	22,085	1955	17	58	0	
Sher-e-Bangla National Cricket Stadium	Dhaka	26,000	2006	20	113	44	
Shaheed Ria Gope Cricket Stadium	Fatullah	25,000	2006	2	10	4	
Bir Shrestho Flight Lieutenant Matiur Rahman Cricket Stadium	Chattogram	22,000	2006	20	22	20	
Sylhet International Cricket Stadium	Sylhet	18,500	2014	1	4	8	
Shaheed Chandu Stadium	Bogura	18,000	2006	1	5	0	
Khulna Divisional Stadium	Khulna	15,000	2006	3	4	5	

Updated: 7 February 2021

Locations of all stadiums which have hosted an international cricket match within Bangladesh

== Test grounds ==
=== Active Test grounds ===
Listed in order of date first used for Test match

Stadium	City	First-class side(s)	Capacity	First used	Ends	Ref
Sher-e-Bangla National Cricket Stadium	Dhaka	Dhaka Division (2006–present); Chittagong Division (2010)	26,000	25 May 2007	• AKS End • Shah Cements End	
Bir Shrestho Flight Lieutenant Matiur Rahman Cricket Stadium	Chattogram	Chattogram Division (2006–present)	22,000	28 February 2006	• Walton End • Isphani End	
Sylhet International Cricket Stadium	Sylhet	Sylhet Division (2000–present)	18,500	3 November 2018	• UCB End • Runner End	

=== Inactive Test grounds ===
Listed in order of date first used for Test match

Stadium	City	First-class side(s)	Capacity	First used	Ends	Ref
Shaheed Chandu Stadium	Bogura	Rajshahi Division (2005–2007); Sylhet Division (2005); Dhaka Division (2007 & 2010); Barisal Division (2007–2008); Khulna Division (2010); Chittagong Division (2010)	15,000	8 March 2006	Unknown	
Shaheed Ria Gope Cricket Stadium	Fatullah, Narayanganj		25,000	9 April 2006	• Press Box End • Pavilion End	
Khulna Divisional Stadium	Khulna	Khulna Division (2005–2008); Dhaka Division (2010); Barisal Division (2010); Chittagong Division (2010)	15,000	21 November 2012	Unknown	

=== Former Test grounds ===
Official name (known as)	City	First-class side/s	Capacity	First used	Ends	Ref
District Stadium, Chittagong	Chattogram	East Pakistan (1954–1956); Chittagong (1965); Chittagong Division (2001–2002)	40,000	15 November 2001	• Pedrollo End • Ispahani End	
National Stadium, Dhaka	Dhaka	no longer hosts cricket	36,000	1 January 1955	• Pavilion End • Paltan End	

== Non-Test grounds ==
Official name (known as)	City or town	First-class side/s	Capacity	Ends	Ref
Faridpur Stadium	Faridpur	Dhaka Division (2000–2002)	30,000	—	
District Stadium, Mymensingh	Mymensingh	Biman Bangladesh Airlines (2000); Dhaka Division (2000–2002)	25,000	—	
Gopalganj Stadium	Gopalganj	Dhaka Division (1996–2013)	18,000	—	
Barisal Divisional Stadium	Barishal	Barisal Division (2000–2006)	15,000	—	
Shaheed Kamruzzaman Stadium	Rajshahi	Rajshahi Division (2000–2018); Dhaka Division (2010); Chittagong Division (2010)	15,000	—	
Shamsul Huda Stadium	Jashore	Khulna Division (2000–2004)	12,000	—	
Bangladesh Krira Shikkha Protisthan Ground	Savar	Biman Bangladesh Airlines (2000–2001); Dhaka Division (2002 & 2009); Chittagong Division (2009–2010)	10,000	—	
Bangladesh Krira Shikkha Protisthan No 2 Ground	Savar	Chittagong Division (2006); Khulna Division (2007-present); Barisal Division (2007–present); Rajshahi Division (2009); Dhaka Division (2010)	10,000	—	
Dhanmondi Cricket Stadium	Dhaka	Dhaka Metropolis (2000–2001); Dhaka Division (2002–2009); Chittagong Division (2002 & 2009); Khulna Division (2002–2003 & 2006); Barisal Division (2002 & 2006–2009)	10,000	—	
Outer Stadium Ground	Dhaka	Dacca (1965)	10,000		
Shaheed Bulu Stadium	Noakhali	Chittagong Division (2000-2001)	10,000	—	-
Niaz Mohammad Stadium	Brahmanbaria	Chittagong Division (1999-2000)	15,000	—	-
Cricket Garden	Rangpur	Rajshahi Division (2000–2004)	8,000	—	
Shaheed Dhirendranath Datta Stadium	Cumilla	Chittagong Division (2000-2004)	8,000	—	
Cox's Bazar International Cricket Stadium	Cox's Bazar	Chittagong Division (2013–2017)	7,800		

== Under construction ==
Official name (known as)	City or town	Capacity	Construction started	Construction ends
National Cricket Ground	Purbachal New Town, Dhaka	50,000 (estimated)	2019	unknown

== See also ==
- Stadiums in Bangladesh
- Sher-e-Bangla Cricket Stadium
- Lists of stadiums
