= List of stadiums in Bangladesh =

Various types of sports are played in different districts of Bangladesh. The following locations (Absolute location) are sporting grounds (specially football and cricket) across different districts in Bangladesh. Only stadiums with a minimum capacity of 5,000 are included in this list.

== Current stadiums ==
#	Image	Stadium	Capacity	City	District	Sport(s)
1		District Stadium, Chittagong	40,000	Chittagong	Chittagong	Cricket, football & others
2		Abdur Rab Serniabad Stadium	30,000	Barisal Sadar Upazila	Barisal	Cricket, football & others
3		Rajshahi University Stadium	26,000	Rajshahi University Campus	Rajshahi	Cricket, football & others
4		Bir Sherestha Shaheed Shipahi Mostafa Kamal Stadium	25,000	Kamalapur	Dhaka	Football
5		Sher-e-Bangla National Cricket Stadium	25,000	Mirpur Thana	Dhaka	Cricket
6		District Stadium, Mymensingh	25,000	Mymensingh Sadar Upazila	Mymensingh	Cricket, football & others
7		National Stadium, Dhaka	22,085	Motijheel Thana	Dhaka	Football & athletics
8		Bir Shrestho Flight Lieutenant Matiur Rahman Cricket Stadium	22,000	Sagarika	Chittagong	Cricket
9		Rajshahi District Stadium	20,000	Railgate	Rajshahi	Cricket, football & others
10		Bangladesh Army Stadium	20,000	Cantonment Thana	Dhaka	Football
11		Sylhet International Cricket Stadium	18,500	Sylhet	Sylhet	Cricket, football & others
12		Shaheed Dhirendranath Datta Stadium	18,000	Cumilla	Comilla	Cricket, football & others
13		Gopalganj International Cricket Stadium	18,000	Gopalganj Sadar Upazila	Gopalganj	Cricket
14		Shaheed Abrar Fahad Stadium	15,000	Chorhas	Kushtia	Cricket, football & others
15		Shaheed Kamruzzaman Stadium	15,000	Terokhadia	Rajshahi	Cricket, football & others
16		Shaheed Chandu Stadium	15,000	Khandar	Bogra	Cricket, football & others
17		Sheikh Abu Naser Stadium	15,000	Mujgunni	Khulna	Cricket
18		Khan Shaheb Osman Ali Stadium	15,000	Fatullah	Narayanganj	Cricket
19		Sylhet District Stadium	15,000	Sylhet	Sylhet	Cricket, football & others
20		Bashundhara Kings Arena	6,000	Bashundhara	Dhaka	Football
21		Rajshahi Mahila Krira Complex Stadiums	5,000	Rajshahi	Rajshahi	Cricket, football & others
22		Cox's Bazar Stadium	5,000	Cox's Bazar Sadar Upazila	Cox's Bazar	Football
23		Rajbari District Stadium	5,000	Rajbari Sadar Upazila	Rajbari	Cricket, football & others

== See also ==
- List of football stadiums in Bangladesh
- List of cricket grounds in Bangladesh
- Lists of stadiums
