= National Sports Council =

Bangladeshi sports organisation

- জাতীয় ক্রীড়া পরিষদ
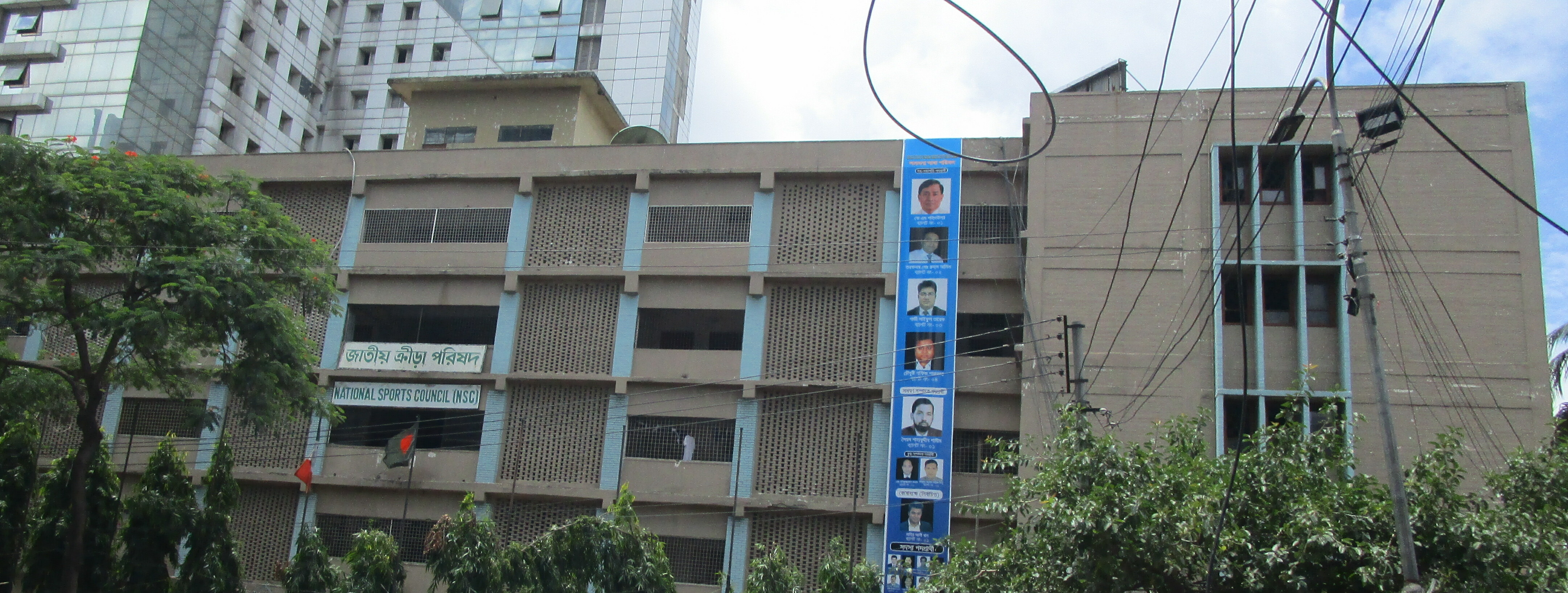
- National Sports Council office

Agency overview
- Formed: 1974; 52 years ago
- Jurisdiction: Government of Bangladesh
- Headquarters: Purana Paltan, Dhaka
- Agency executive: Aminul Haque, Secretary
- Parent department: Ministry of Youth and Sports
- Website: nsc.gov.bd

The National Sports Council (NSC) is the national overseer of the control authorities of 41 different sports in Bangladesh. It is responsible to the Bangladesh Ministry of Youth and Sports and is based in Purana Paltan, Dhaka.

== History ==
Prior to the independence of Bangladesh, the East Pakistan Sports Federation (EPSF), reformed on 20 May 1951, served as the primary sports body in East Pakistan. Habibullah Bahar Chowdhury and Siddikur Rahman were the reformed organization's first president and general secretary, respectively.

After the Bangladesh Liberation War, the Bangladesh Sports Control Board was formed in 1972 in what was once the headquarters of the EPSF. In 1974 it became the National Sports Council. Kazi Anisur Rahman was the first secretary of the National Sports Council from 9 February 1972 to 31 March 1975.

== See also ==
- Bangladesh Olympic Association
