= List of Asian stadiums by capacity =

The following is a complete list of sports stadiums in Central Asia, North Asia, East Asia, South Asia, Southeast Asia, and West Asia. They are ordered by their capacity. Stadiums with a capacity of 30,000 or more are included.

Most large stadiums in the continent of Asia are used for football, cricket, athletics, or baseball, depending on the regions. Capacity, that is the maximum number of spectators the stadium can normally accommodate, therefore excluding temporary extra accommodations.

== Current stadiums ==
ستاديون هاراڤان باڠسا

Rank	Stadium	Capacity	City	Country	Region	Images	Tenants
1	Narendra Modi Stadium નરેન્દ્ર મોદી સ્ટેડિયમ	132,000	Ahmedabad	India	South Asia		Gujarat Titans, Gujarat cricket team, Gujarat women's cricket team, Indian cricket team, India women's national cricket team, India national under-19 cricket team, India women's national under-19 cricket team
2	Rungrado 1st of May Stadium 릉라도 5월1일 경기장	114,000	Pyongyang	North Korea	East Asia	Rŭngrado May First Stadium	Korea DPR national football team
3	Bukit Jalil National Stadium Stadium Nasional Bukit Jalil ستاديوم ناسيونل بوكيت جليل	90,000	Kuala Lumpur	Malaysia	Southeast Asia		Malaysia national football team
4	Lusail Stadium استاد لوسيل	88,966	Lusail	Qatar	West Asia	Lusail Stadium	2022 FIFA World Cup
5	Vivekananda Yuba Bharati Krirangan যুব ভারতী ক্রীড়াঙ্গন	85,000	Kolkata	India	South Asia	Salt Lake Stadium	India national football team, East Bengal FC, Mohammedan SC, Mohun Bagan Super Giant
6	Jakarta International Stadium Stadion Internasional Jakarta	82,000	Jakarta	Indonesia	Southeast Asia	Jakarta International Stadium	Persija Jakarta, Indonesia national football team
7	Shah Alam Stadium (closed since 2023) Stadium Shah Alam ستاديوم شاه عالم	80,372	Shah Alam	Malaysia	Southeast Asia	Shah Alam Stadium	Selangor FA
8	Japan National Stadium 新国立競技場	80,200	Tokyo	Japan	East Asia	New National Stadium	Japan national football team, Japan national rugby union team
9	Guangdong Olympic Stadium 广东奥林匹克体育中心	80,012	Guangzhou	China	East Asia	Guangdong Olympic Stadium	2010 Asian Games
10	Hangzhou Sports Park Stadium 杭州奥体博览城	80,000	Hangzhou	China	East Asia		2022 Asian Games
11	National Stadium 北京国家体育场	80,000	Beijing	China	East Asia	Beijing national stadium	2008 Summer Olympics and 2022 Winter Olympics
12	Azadi Stadium ورزشگاه آزادی	78,116	Tehran	Iran	West Asia		Iran national football team, Esteghlal, Persepolis
13	Gelora Bung Karno Main Stadium Stadion Utama Gelora Bung Karno	77,193	Jakarta	Indonesia	Southeast Asia		Indonesia national football team, Persija Jakarta
14	International Stadium Yokohama 横浜国際総合競技場	72,327	Yokohama	Japan	East Asia	NISSANSTADIUM20080608	Yokohama F. Marinos
15	Shanghai Stadium 上海体育场	72,000	Shanghai	China	East Asia	Shanghai Stadium	Shanghai Shenhua
16	Yadegar-e Emam Stadium ورزشگاه یادگار امام	70,000	Tabriz	Iran	West Asia	Tabriz Yadegar-e Emam Stadium	Tractor Club
17	Seoul Olympic Stadium 서울올림픽주경기장	69,950	Seoul	South Korea	East Asia	:Seoul (Sports Complex) from ASEM Tower - panoramio	
18	Baku Olympic Stadium Bakı Olimpiya stadionu	69,870	Baku	Azerbaijan	West Asia	Baku Olympic Stadium	Azerbaijan national football team
19	Al-Bayt Stadium استاد البيت	68,895	Al Khor	Qatar	West Asia	Al Bayt Stadium	2022 FIFA World Cup
20	King Fahd Sports City Stadium ملعب مدينة الملك فهد الرياضية	68,752	Riyadh	Saudi Arabia	West Asia	King Fahd Stadium	Saudi Arabia national football team
21	Workers' Stadium 工人体育场	68,000	Beijing	China	East Asia	Workers' Stadium	Beijing Guoan
22	Seoul World Cup Stadium 서울월드컵경기장	66,806	Seoul	South Korea	East Asia	Seoul World Cup Stadium (2018) 07	South Korea national football team, FC Seoul, 2002 FIFA World Cup
23	Daegu Stadium 대구스타디움	66,422	Daegu	South Korea	East Asia	Daegu Stadium	Daegu FC, 2002 FIFA World Cup, 2011 World Championships in Athletics
24	Eden Gardens ইডেন গার্ডেন্স	66,349	Kolkata	India	South Asia	Eden Gardens under floodlights during a match	Bengal cricket team, Kolkata Knight Riders
25	Basra International Stadium مدينة البصرة الرياضية	65,227	Basra	Iraq	West Asia	Basra International Stadium	Iraq national football team
26	Shaheed Veer Narayan Singh International Cricket Stadium शहीद वीर नारायण सिंह इंटरनेशनल क्रिकेट स्टेडियम	65,000	Naya Raipur	India	South Asia	Shaheed Veer Narayan Singh International Cricket Stadium	Local sports teams
27	Saitama Stadium 2002 埼玉スタジアム2◯◯2	63,700	Saitama	Japan	East Asia	Saitama stadium	Urawa Red Diamonds
28	King Abdullah Sports City Stadium ملعب مدينة الملك عبدالله الرياضية	62,345	Jeddah	Saudi Arabia	West Asia	King Abdullah stadium	Saudi Arabia national football team, Al-Ahli FC, Al-Ittihad SC
29	Shenzhen Universiade Sports Centre 深圳大运体育中心	60,334	Shenzhen	China	East Asia	Shenzhen Universiade Stadium	2011 Summer Universiade
30	Zhengzhou Olympic Sports Centre Stadium 郑州奥林匹克体育中心体育场	60,000	Zhengzhou	China	East Asia		
31	Dalian Barracuda Bay Stadium 大连梭子鱼湾体育场	60,000	Dalian	China	East Asia		
32	Jawaharlal Nehru Stadium जवाहरलाल नेहरू स्टेडियम	60,000	New Delhi	India	South Asia	Delhi Jawaharlal Nehru Stadium	India national football team, SC Delhi, Punjab FC
33	Longxing Football Stadium 龙兴足球场	60,000	Chongqing	China	East Asia	Longxing Football Stadium	Local sports teams
34	Morodok Techo National Stadium ពហុកីឡដ្ឋានជាតិមរតកតេជោ	60,000	Phnom Penh	Cambodia	Southeast Asia		Cambodia national football team
35	Nanjing Olympic Sports Centre Stadium 南京奥林匹克体育中心	60,000	Nanjing	China	East Asia	Nanjing Olympic Sports Center	
36	Shenyang Olympic Sports Centre Stadium 沈阳奥林匹克体育中心	60,000	Shenyang	China	East Asia		Local football teams, 2008 Summer Olympics football tournament
37	Hefei Olympic Sports Centre Stadium 合肥奥林匹克体育中心	60,000	Hefei	China	East Asia		Local sports teams
38	Lanzhou Olympic Sports Centre Stadium 兰州奥林匹克体育中心体育场	60,000	Lanzhou	China	East Asia		Lanzhou Longyuan Athletic F.C.
39	Guangxi Sports Centre Stadium 广西体育中心	60,000	Nanning	China	East Asia		Local sports teams
40	Naghsh-e Jahan Stadium ورزشگاه نقش جهان	60,000	Isfahan	Iran	West Asia	Naghsh-e-Jahan Stadium3	Sepahan
41	Jaber al-Ahmad International Stadium إستاد جابر الأحمد الدولي	60,000	Kuwait City	Kuwait	West Asia	Jaber al-Ahmad International Stadium	Kuwait national football team
42	Chongqing Olympic Sports Centre Stadium 重庆市奥林匹克体育中心体育场	58,680	Chongqing	China	East Asia	Chongqing Olympic Sports Center	
43	Jinan Olympic Sports Centre Stadium 济南奥林匹克体育中心	56,808	Jinan	China	East Asia	Jinan Olympic Sports Centre Stadium	Shandong Luneng
44	Busan Asiad Main Stadium 부산아시아드주경기장	56,000	Busan	South Korea	East Asia	Busan Asiad Stadium	Busan IPark, 2002 Asian Games
45	Tianhe Stadium 天河体育中心体育场	56,000	Guangzhou	China	East Asia	Tianhe Sports Centre Stadium	
46	Philippine Arena	55,000	Ciudad de Victoria	Philippines	Southeast Asia	Philippine Arena	Philippines national basketball team
47	Greenfield International Stadium തിരുവനന്തപുരം ഗ്രീൻഫീൽഡ് സ്റ്റേഡിയം	55,000	Thiruvananthapuram	India	South Asia	Greenfield International Stadium	Kerala cricket team, India national cricket team
48	He Long Stadium 贺龙体育场	55,000	Changsha	China	East Asia	He Long Stadium	
49	Kaohsiung National Stadium 國家體育場	55,000	Kaohsiung	Taiwan	East Asia	Kaohsiung National Stadium	Taipower FC, Chinese Taipei national football team, Chinese Taipei national rugby union team, World Games 2009
50	Singapore National Stadium 新加坡国家体育场 Stadium Nasional Singapura சிங்கப்பூர் தேசிய அரங்கம்	55,000	Kallang	Singapore	Southeast Asia	Singapore National Stadium	Singapore national football team
51	Dr. DY Patil Sports Stadium डी.वाय. पाटील स्टेडियम	55,000	Navi Mumbai	India	South Asia	DY Patil Stadium	Mumbai Indians
52	Boris Paitchadze Dinamo Arena	54,549	Tbilisi	Georgia	West Asia	Boris Paichadze Dinamo Arena	FC Dinamo Tbilisi, Georgia national football team, Georgia national rugby union team
53	Hrazdan Stadium	54,208	Yerevan	Armenia	West Asia	Hrazdan Stadium	FC Ararat Yerevan, Armenia national football team
54	Tianjin Olympic Centre Stadium 天津奥林匹克中心体育场	54,696	Tianjin	China	East Asia	Tianjin Olympic Centre Stadium	Tianjin Jinmen Tiger, 2008 Summer Olympics football tournament
55	Wuhan Sports Centre Stadium 武汉体育中心体育场	54,000	Wuhan	China	East Asia	Wuhan Sports Centre Stadium	Wuhan Three Towns
56	Aleppo International Stadium ملعب حلب الدولي	53,200	Aleppo	Syria	West Asia	Aleppo International Stadium, day view, 2009 (1)	Al-Ittihad
57	Phoenix Mountain Stadium 凤凰山体育公园专业足球场	52,800	Chengdu	China	East Asia	Phoenix Mountain Stadium	Chengdu Rongcheng
58	Incheon Munhak Stadium 인천문학경기장 주경기장	52,200	Incheon	South Korea	East Asia	Incheon Munhak Stadium	2002 FIFA World Cup
59	Guiyang Olympic Sports Centre Stadium 贵阳奥林匹克体育中心	51,636	Guizhou	China	East Asia	Guiyang Olympic Sports Centre Stadium	Guizhou Zhucheng Athletic F.C.
60	Hohhot City Stadium 呼和浩特市体育场	51,632	Hohhot	China	East Asia	Hohhot City Stadium	Local sports teams
61	Shizuoka Stadium ECOPA 静岡スタジアム・エコパ	51,349	Fukuroi	Japan	East Asia	Shizuoka Stadium ECOPA	Júbilo Iwata, Shimizu S-Pulse
62	İzmir Atatürk Stadium	51,295	İzmir	Turkey	West Asia		
63	Yellow Dragon Sports Center 杭州黄龙体育场	51,139	Hangzhou	China	East Asia	Yellow Dragon Sports Center	Zhejiang
64	Shaanxi Province Stadium 陕西省体育场	51,000	Xi'an	China	East Asia		Local sports teams
65	Ajinomoto Stadium 味の素スタジアム	50,100	Tokyo	Japan	East Asia	Ajinomoto Stadium	FC Tokyo, Tokyo Verdy
66	Wenzhou Olympic Sports Centre Stadium 温州奥林匹克体育中心体育场	50,000	Wenzhou	China	East Asia		
67	Brabourne Stadium	50,000	Mumbai	India	South Asia	Brabourne Stadium	Cricket Club of India
68	EMS Corporation Stadium ഇ എം എസ് കോർപറേഷൻ സ്റ്റേഡിയം	50,000	Kozhikode	India	South Asia	Kozhikode	Gokulam Kerala
69	Pars Shiraz Stadium ورزشگاه پارس شیراز	50,000	Shiraz	Iran	West Asia	Pars Stadium in Shiraz	Fajr Sepasi Shiraz
70	Qingdao Youth Football Stadium 青岛青少年足球场	50,000	Qingdao	China	East Asia	Qingdao Youth Football Stadium	Qingdao Hainiu
71	Yanmar Stadium Nagai ヤンマースタジアム長居	50,000	Osaka	Japan	East Asia	Yanmar Stadium Nagai	Cerezo Osaka
72	Sultan Mizan Zainal Abidin Stadium Stadium Sultan Mizan Zainal Abidin ستاديوم سلطان ميزان زين العابدين	50,000	Kuala Terengganu	Malaysia	Southeast Asia	Sultan Mizan Zainal Abidin Stadium	Terengganu FC
73	Jiangxi Olympic Sports Centre Stadium 江西省奥林匹克中心体育场	50,000	Nanchang	China	East Asia		Local sports teams
74	Ekana International Cricket Stadium इकाना इन्टरनेशनल क्रिकेट स्टेडियम	50,000	Lucknow	India	South Asia	Ekana International Cricket Stadium	Local sports teams
75	Yashwant Stadium	50,000	Nagpur	India	South Asia		
76	Kai Tak Stadium 啟德主場館	50,000	Kowloon	Hong Kong	East Asia	Kai Tak Stadium	Hong Kong national football team
77	Rajamangala National Stadium ราชมังคลากีฬาสถาน	49,722	Bangkok	Thailand	Southeast Asia	Rajamamgala National Stadium	Thailand national football team
78	Camille Chamoun Sports City Stadium ملعب مدينة كميل شمعون الرياضية	49,500	Beirut	Lebanon	West Asia	Camille Chamoun Sports City Stadium	Lebanon national football team
79	Miyagi Stadium 宮城スタジアム	49,133	Rifu	Japan	East Asia	Miyagi Stadium	Vegalta Sendai
80	Jinnah Sports Stadium جناح اسپورٹس اسٹیڈیم	48,700	Islamabad	Pakistan	South Asia		Pakistan national football team
81	Harbin International Convention and Exhibition Centre Stadium 哈尔滨国际会展中心体育场	48,000	Harbin	China	East Asia		Local sports teams
82	Ülker Stadyumu	47,834	Istanbul	Turkey	West Asia		Fenerbahçe SK
83	Hanshin Koshien Stadium 阪神甲子園球場	47,757	Nishinomiya	Japan	East Asia	Koshien Baseball Stadium	Hanshin Tigers, National High School Baseball Championship, National High School Baseball Invitational Tournament
84	Fisht Olympic Stadium Олимпийский стадион «Фишт»	47,659	Sochi	Russia	West Asia	Fisht Olympic Stadium	PFC Sochi
85	Stadion Gelora Bung Tomo Stadion Gelora Bung Tomo	46,806	Surabaya	Indonesia	Southeast Asia	Gelora Bung Tomo Stadium	Persebaya Surabaya
86	Tokyo Dome 東京ドーム	46,314	Tokyo	Japan	East Asia	Tokyo Dome	Yomiuri Giants
87	Assam Cricket Association Stadium	46,000	Guwahati	India	South Asia		Assam cricket team
88	Khalifa International Stadium استاد خليفة الدولي	45,857	Doha	Qatar	West Asia	Khalifa International Stadium	Qatar national football team
89	Ahmad bin Ali Stadium ملعب أحمد بن علي	45,032	Umm Al Afaei	Qatar	West Asia	Ahmad bin Ali Stadium	2022 FIFA World Cup
90	Sanya Sports Centre Egret Stadium 三亚体育中心白鹭体育场场	45,000	Sanya	China	East Asia		
91	Ashgabat Olympic Stadium Saparmyrat Türkmenbaşy adyndaky Olimpiýa Stadiony	45,000	Ashgabat	Turkmenistan	Central Asia		Turkmenistan national football team
92	Latakia Sports City Stadium ملعب المدينة الرياضية باللاذقية	45,000	Latakia	Syria	West Asia		Syria national football team
93	Barabati Stadium ବାରବାଟି ଷ୍ଟାଡିଅମ	45,000	Cuttack	India	South Asia	Barabati Stadium	Odisha cricket team
94	Toyota Stadium 豊田スタジアム	45,000	Toyota City	Japan	East Asia	Toyota Stadium	Nagoya Grampus
95	National Hockey Stadium Lahore نیشنل ہاکی اسٹیڈیم، لاہور	45,000	Lahore	Pakistan	South Asia		Pakistan national field hockey team
96	Qingdao Guoxin Stadium 青岛国信体育A场	45,000	Qingdao	China	East Asia	Qingdao Guoxin Stadium	
97	Kunshan Football Stadium 昆山足球场	45,000	Kunshan	China	East Asia		Local sports teams
98	Zibo Sports Centre Stadium 淄博市体育中心体育场	45,000	Zibo	China	East Asia		Local sports teams
99	Weifang Sports Centre Stadium 潍坊体育中心体育场	45,000	Weifang	China	East Asia		Local sports teams
100	Shenzhen Stadium 深圳体育场	45,000	Shenzhen	China	East Asia	Toyota Stadium	Shenzhen Peng City
101	Vidarbha Cricket Association Stadium विदर्भ क्रिकेट असोसीएशन मैदान	44,904	Nagpur	India	South Asia	Vidarbha Cricket Ground	Vidarbha cricket team
102	Education City Stadium إِسْتَاد المدينة التعليمية	44,667	Al Rayyan	Qatar	West Asia	Education City Stadium	2022 FIFA World Cup
103	Ulsan Munsu Football Stadium 울산문수축구경기장	44,466	Ulsan	South Korea	East Asia		Ulsan HD FC, 2002 FIFA World Cup
104	Al-Thumama Stadium ملعب الثمامة	44,400	Doha	Qatar	West Asia	Al-Thumama Stadium	2022 FIFA World Cup
105	Al-Janoub Stadium استاد الجنوب	44,325	Doha	Qatar	West Asia	|	2022 FIFA World Cup
106	Gwangju World Cup Stadium 광주월드컵경기장	44,118	Gwangju	South Korea	East Asia	Gwanju World Cup Stadium	2002 FIFA World Cup
107	Bao'an Stadium 宝安体育馆	44,050	Shenzhen	China	East Asia	Bao'an Stadium	Shenzhen Juniors
108	Suwon World Cup Stadium 수원월드컵경기장	43,959	Suwon	South Korea	East Asia	Suwon World Cup Stadium	Suwon Samsung Bluewings, 2002 FIFA World Cup
109	Riau Main Stadium Stadion Utama Riau ستاديون أوتاما رياو 廖内主体育场	43,923	Pekanbaru	Indonesia	Southeast Asia	Stadion Utama Riau	PSPS Pekanbaru, Indonesia National Games
110	Centennial Atatürk Stadium	43,761	Bursa	Turkey	West Asia	Yüzüncü Yıl Atatürk Sütaş Stadyumu	Bursaspor
111	Jeonju World Cup Stadium 전주월드컵경기장	43,348	Jeonju	South Korea	East Asia	Jeonju World Cup Stadium	Jeonbuk Hyundai Motors, 2002 FIFA World Cup
112	Resonac Dome Oita レゾナックドーム大分	43,254	Ōita	Japan	East Asia	Resonac Dome Oita	Oita Trinita
113	Zayed Sports City Stadium ستاد مدينة زايد الرياضية	43,206	Abu Dhabi	United Arab Emirates	West Asia	Zayed Sports City Stadium	UAE Emir Cup Finals
114	Jinzhou Binhai Sports Centre Stadium 锦州滨海体育中心体育场	43,000	Jinzhou	China	East Asia		Local sports teams
115	Sapporo Dome 札幌ドーム	42,831	Sapporo	Japan	East Asia	Sapporo Dome	Consadole Sapporo
116	Zhuzhou Stadium 株洲体育中心	42,740	Zhuzhou	China	East Asia		Local sports teams
117	Maharashtra Cricket Association Stadium महाराष्ट्र क्रिकेट असोसिएशन स्टेडियम	42,700	Pune	India	South Asia	Maharashtra Cricket Association Stadium	
118	Perak Stadium Stadium Perak ستاديوم ڤيرق	42,500	Ipoh	Malaysia	Southeast Asia	Stadium Perak	Perak FA
119	Denka Big Swan Stadium デンカビッグスワンスタジアム	42,300	Niigata	Japan	East Asia	Denka Big Swan Stadium	Albirex Niigata
120	Xinjiang Sports Centre 新疆体育中心	42,300	Urumqi	China	East Asia		Local sports teams
121	Goyang Stadium 고양종합운동장	42,055	Goyang	South Korea	East Asia	Goyang Stadium	Goyang KB
122	Mohammed bin Zayed Stadium ستاد محمد بن زايد	42,000	Abu Dhabi	United Arab Emirates	West Asia	Mohammed Bin Zayed Stadium	Al-Jazira Club
123	Darul Makmur Stadium Stadium Darul Makmur ستاديوم دار المعمور	41,873	Kuantan	Malaysia	Southeast Asia		Pahang FA
124	Daejeon World Cup Stadium 대전월드컵경기장	41,295	Daejeon	South Korea	East Asia	Daejeon World Cup Stadium	Daejeon Citizen, 2002 FIFA World Cup
125	Şenol Güneş Sports Complex	41,000	Trabzon	Turkey	West Asia		
126	Dasharath Rangasala (Nepali: दशरथ रङ्गशाला; transl. Dasharath Stadium)	41,000	Kathmandu	Nepal	South Asia	Dasarath Rangasala	Nepal national football team and Kathmandu Rayzrs FC
127	Huainan Sports Stadium 淮南体育场	40,868	Huainan	China	East Asia		Local sports teams
128	Taipei Dome 台北大巨蛋	40,575	Taipei	Taiwan	East Asia	Taipei Dome in 2023	Chinese Taipei national baseball team, Chinese Professional Baseball League
129	Nagoya Dome ナゴヤドーム	40,500	Nagoya	Japan	East Asia	Nagoya Dome	Chunichi Dragons
130	Lukas Enembe Stadium Stadion Lukas Enembe	40,263	Jayapura	Indonesia	Southeast Asia	Stadion Lukas Enembe	Persipura Jayapura
131	Mỹ Đình National Stadium Sân vận động Quốc gia Mỹ Đình	40,192	Hanoi	Vietnam	Southeast Asia	Mỹ Đình National Stadium	Vietnam
132	Mizuho PayPay Dome Fukuoka みずほPayPayドーム福岡	40,142	Fukuoka	Japan	East Asia	Fukuoka Paypay Dome	Fukuoka SoftBank Hawks
133	Shaoxing China Textile City Sports Centre Stadium 绍兴中国轻纺城体育中心	40,000	Shaoxing	China	East Asia		
134	Jawaharlal Nehru Stadium ജവഹർലാൽ നെഹ്റു സ്റ്റേഡിയം	40,000	Kochi	India	South Asia	Jawaharlal Nehru, Kochi	Kerala Blasters
135	Lal Bahadur Shastri Stadium ലാൽ ബഹാദൂർ ശാസ്ത്രി സ്റ്റേഡിയം	40,000	Kollam	India	South Asia	Lal Bahadur Shastri Stadium	
136	Batakan Stadium Stadion Batakan	40,000	Balikpapan	Indonesia	Southeast Asia	Batakan Stadium	Persiba Balikpapan
137	Gelora Joko Samudro Stadium Stadion Gelora Joko Samudro	40,000	Gresik Regency	Indonesia	Southeast Asia	Gelora Joko Samudro Stadium	
138	Yantai Sports Park Stadium 烟台体育公园	40,000	Yantai	China	East Asia		Local sports teams
139	Anyang City Cultural and Sports Centre Stadium 安阳市文体中心体育场	40,000	Anyang	China	East Asia		Local sports teams
140	Chuzhou Olympic Sports Centre Stadium 滁州奥体中心体育场	40,000	Chuzhou	China	East Asia		Local sports teams
141	MA Aziz Stadium	40,000	Chittagong	Bangladesh	South Asia	MA Aziz Stadium	
142	Peoples Football Stadium لوگ فٹ بال اسٹیڈیم	40,000	Karachi	Pakistan	South Asia		Pakistan national football team
143	Chennai Jawaharlal Nehru Stadium ஜவஹர்லால் நேரு விளையாட்டரங்கம்	40,000	Chennai	India	South Asia	Chennai Jawaharlal Nehru Stadium	Indian Bank Recreational Club, Chennayin FC
144	Hang Jebat Stadium Stadium Hang Jebat ستاديوم هڠ جبت	40,000	Malacca	Malaysia	Southeast Asia	Hang Jebat Stadium	
145	Hong Kong Stadium 香港大球場	40,000	So Kon Po	Hong Kong	East Asia	Hong Kong Stadium	Hong Kong National Football Team
146	Olympic Sports Centre Stadium 奥体中心体育场	40,000	Beijing	China	East Asia	Olympic Sports Centre Stadium	Local sports teams
147	Penang State Stadium ستاديوم نڬري ڤولاو ڤينڠ 槟城州立体育场 பினாங்கு மாநில அரங்கம்	40,000	Batu Kawan	Malaysia	Southeast Asia	Penang State Stadium	Penang FC
148	Sarawak Stadium Stadium Sarawak ستاديوم سراوق	40,000	Kuching	Malaysia	Southeast Asia	Sarawak Stadium	Sarawak FA
149	Kanchenjunga Stadium কাঞ্চনজঙ্ঘা স্টেডিয়াম	40,000	Siliguri	India	South Asia	Kanchenjunga Stadium	Local football teams
150	JRD Tata Sports Complex Stadium जेआरडी टाटा खेल परिसर	40,000	Jamshedpur	India	South Asia	JRD Tata Sports Stadium	Jamshedpur FC
151	Bogyoke Aung San Stadium ဗိုလ်ချုပ် အောင်ဆန်း အားကစားကွင်း	40,000	Yangon	Myanmar	Southeast Asia	Aung San Stadium	Local football teams
152	Wuhu Olympic Stadium 芜湖奥林匹克体育场	40,000	Wuhu	China	East Asia		Local sports teams
153	Huizhou Olympic Stadium 惠州奥林匹克体育场	40,000	Huizhou	China	East Asia		Local sports teams
154	Tiexi Stadium 铁西新区体育中心	40,000	Tiexi	China	East Asia	Abbasiyyin Stadium	Liaoning Tieren
155	Kim Il-sung Stadium 김일성경기장	40,000	Pyongyang	North Korea	East Asia	Kim-Il-sung-Stadium-2014	Pyongyang City Sports Group
156	Luoyang Stadium 洛阳体育场	39,888	Luoyang	China	East Asia		Local sports teams
157	Panasonic Stadium Suita パナソニックスタジアム吹田	39,694	Suita	Japan	East Asia	Suita City Football Stadium	Gamba Osaka
158	Guangzhou Higher Education Mega Center Central Stadium 广州大学城中心区体育场	39,346	Guangzhou	China	East Asia	Guangzhou Higher Education Mega Center Central Stadium	Local sports teams
159	Rajiv Gandhi International Cricket Stadium రాజీవ్ గాంధీ ఇంటర్నేషనల్ క్రికెట్ స్టేడియం	39,200	Hyderabad	India	South Asia	Rajiv Gandhi International Cricket Stadium	Hyderabad cricket team, Sunrisers Hyderabad
160	Kashima Football Stadium 県立カシマサッカースタジアム	39,026	Kashima	Japan	East Asia	Kashima Soccer Stadium	Kashima Antlers
161	JSCA International Stadium झारखण्ड स्टेट क्रिकेट एसोसिएशन	39,000	Ranchi	India	South Asia		Jharkhand cricket team
162	Ghadir Stadium ورزشگاه غدیر اهواز	38,960	Ahvaz	Iran	West Asia	Ahvaz Ghadir Stadium	Foolad and Esteghlal Khuzestan
163	Changchun Stadium 长春体育场	38,500	Changchun	China	East Asia	Changchun Stadium	Changchun Yatai
164	MA Chidambaram Stadium எம். ஏ. சிதம்பரம் ஸ்டேடியம்	38,200	Chennai	India	South Asia	MA Chidambaram Stadium	Tamil Nadu cricket team Chennai Super Kings
165	King Abdul Aziz Stadium ستاد الملك عبدالعزيز	38,000	Mecca	Saudi Arabia	West Asia		Al-Wehda Club
166	Gelora Bandung Lautan Api Stadium Stadion Gelora Bandung Lautan Api ᮞ᮪ᮒᮓᮤᮚᮧᮔ᮪ ᮌᮨᮜᮧᮛ ᮘᮔ᮪ᮓᮥᮀ ᮜᮅᮒᮔ᮪ ᮃᮕᮤ	38,000	Bandung	Indonesia	Southeast Asia	Gelora Bandung Lautan Api Stadium	Persib Bandung, 2016 Indonesia National Games
167	Meiji Jingu Stadium 明治神宮野球場	37,933	Tokyo	Japan	East Asia	Meiji Jingu Stadium	Tokyo Yakult Swallows
168	Torku Arena	37,829	Konya	Turkey	West Asia	Torku Arena	Konyaspor
169	TEDA Football Stadium 泰达足球场	37,450	Tianjin	China	East Asia	TEDA Football Stadium	Tianjin Jinmen Tiger
170	Pudong Football Stadium 浦东足球场	37,000	Shanghai	China	East Asia		Shanghai Port
171	Hiroshima Big Arch 広島ビッグアーチ	36,894	Hiroshima	Japan	East Asia	Hiroshima Big Arch	Sanfrecce Hiroshima
172	Kyocera Dome Osaka 京セラドーム大阪	36,627	Osaka	Japan	East Asia	Kyocera Dome Osaka	Orix Buffaloes
173	Saitama Super Arena さいたまスーパーアリーナ	36,500	Saitama	Japan	East Asia	Saitama Super Arena	Basketball
174	Century Lotus Stadium 世纪莲体育场	36,000	Foshan	China	East Asia	Century Lotus Stadium	Local sports teams
175	Kuishan Sports Centre Stadium 奎山体育中心体育场	36,000	Rizhao	China	East Asia		Local sports teams
176	Kobe Universiade Memorial Stadium 神戸総合運動公園ユニバー記念競技場	35,910	Kobe	Japan	East Asia		Vissel Kobe
177	Al-Shaab Stadium ملعب الشعب	35,700	Baghdad	Iraq	West Asia	Al-Shaab Stadium	Baghdad Derbies
178	Yiwu Meihu Sports Centre 义乌梅湖体育中心	35,260	Yiwu	China	East Asia		Local sports teams
179	Arun Jaitley Cricket Stadium फ़िरोज़ शाह कोटला	35,200	Delhi	India	South Asia	Arun Jaitley Cricket Stadium	Delhi cricket team, Delhi Daredevils
180	Ordos Dongsheng Stadium 鄂尔多斯东胜体育场 ᠣᠷᠳᠣᠰᠳᠣᠩᠱᠧᠨᠰᠲ᠋ᠠᠳᠢᠶᠣᠨ	35,107	Ordos	China	East Asia		Local sports teams
181	Central Stadium Центральный стадион	35,696	Yekaterinburg	Russia	North Asia	Central Stadium	FC Ural Yekaterinburg
182	Es Con Field Hokkaido エスコンフィールド北海道	35,000	Kitahiroshia	Japan	East Asia	Es Con Field Hokkaido	Hokkaido Nippon-Ham Fighters
183	Nanyang Sports Centre Stadium 南洋体育中心体育场	35,000	Nanyang	China	East Asia		Local sports teams
184	Pakhtakor Markaziy Stadium Paxtakor Markaziy Stadioni	35,000	Tashkent	Uzbekistan	Central Asia	Tashkent Pakhtakor Markaziy Stadium	Pakhtakor, Uzbekistan national football team
185	Samen al-Aeme Stadium استاديوم ثامن الائمه	35,000	Mashhad	Iran	West Asia	Samen al-Aeme Stadium	Aboumoslem and Padideh
186	Kunming Tuodong Sports Center 昆明拓东体育场	35,000	Kunming	China	East Asia	Kunming Tuodong Sports Center	China national football team, local football teams
187	Ansan Wa~ Stadium 안산 와~ 스타디움	35,000	Ansan	South Korea	East Asia	Ansan Wa~ Stadium	
188	Chuncheon Civic Stadium 춘천공설운동장	35,000	Chuncheon	South Korea	East Asia		Local sports teams
189	Gumi Civic Stadium 구미종합운동장	35,000	Gumi	South Korea	East Asia		Local sports teams
190	Stadion Aji Imbut Stadion Aji Imbut	35,000	Tenggarong	Indonesia	Southeast Asia	Aji Imbut Stadium	Mitra Kukar FC
191	Gelora Delta Stadium Stadion Gelora Delta	35,000	Sidoarjo Regency	Indonesia	Southeast Asia		Persida Sidoarjo
192	Stadion Palaran Stadion Palaran	35,000	Samarinda	Indonesia	Southeast Asia	Stadion Palaran	Borneo FC
193	Suzhou City Stadium 苏州市体育场	35,000	Suzhou	China	East Asia		Local football teams
194	Liuzhou Sports Centre Stadium 柳州体育中心	35,000	Liuzhou	China	East Asia		Local football teams
195	Jiaxing Sports Centre Stadium 嘉兴体育中心体育场	35,000	Jiaxing	China	East Asia		Local sports teams
196	Zhuhai Stadium 珠海市体育中心	35,000	Zhuhai	China	East Asia	Zhuhui Stadium	Local sports teams
197	Hwaseong Stadium 화성종합경기타운	35,000	Hwaseong	South Korea	East Asia		Local sports teams
198	R. Premadasa International Cricket Stadium ආර්. ප්රේමදාස ජාත්යන්තර ක්රිකට් ක්රීඩාංගණය ஆர். பிரேமதாச சர்வதேச கிரிக்கெட் விளையாட்டு மைதானம்	35,000	Colombo	Sri Lanka	South Asia	Premadasa International Cricket Stadium	Sri Lanka national cricket team, Basnahira North cricket team
199	Pallekele International Cricket Stadium පල්ලෙකැලේ ජාත්‍යන්තර ක්‍රිකට් ක්‍රීඩාංගණය பல்லேகலை சர்வதேச கிரிக்கெட் விளையாட்டு மைதானம்	35,000	Kandy	Sri Lanka	South Asia	Pallekele International Cricket Stadium	Sri Lanka national cricket team, Kandurata cricket team
200	Mahinda Rajapaksa International Stadium මහින්ද රාජපක්ෂ ජාත්‍යන්තර ක්‍රීඩාංගනය மஹிந்த ராஜபக்ஷ சர்வதேச மைதானம்	35,000	Hambantota	Sri Lanka	South Asia		Sri Lanka national cricket team
201	Birsa Munda Athletics Stadium बिरसा मुंडा एथलेटिक्स स्टेडियम	35,000	Ranchi	India	South Asia		Local sports teams
202	Sariwon Youth Stadium 사리원 청년 경기장	35,000	Sariwon	North Korea	East Asia		Local sports teams
203	Hamhung Stadium 함흥 경기장	35,000	Hamhung	North Korea	East Asia		Local sports teams
204	Gaeseong Stadium 개성 경기장	35,000	Gaeseong	North Korea	East Asia		Local sports teams
205	New Eskişehir Stadium	34,930	Eskişehir	Turkey	West Asia	New Eskişehir Stadium	Eskişehirspor
206	Izmit Stadyumu	34,712	Izmit	Turkey	West Asia		Kocaelispor
207	Bucheon Stadium 부천종합운동장	34,456	Bucheon	South Korea	East Asia	Bucheon Stadium	Bucheon FC 1995
208	National Stadium, Karachi نیشنل اسٹیڈیم، کراچی	34,228	Karachi	Pakistan	South Asia		Karachi cricket teams, Pakistan International Airlines cricket team, Pakistan national cricket team
209	Qujing City Cultural and Sports Park Stadium 曲靖市文体公园体育场	34,162	Qujing	China	East Asia		Local sports teams
210	Yokohama Stadium 横浜スタジアム	34,046	Yokohama	Japan	East Asia	Yokohama Stadium	Yokohama DeNA Baystars
211	NOEVIR Stadium Kobe ノエビアスタジアム神戸	34,000	Kobe	Japan	East Asia	Noevir Stadium Kobe	Vissel Kobe
212	Quanzhou Sports Centre Stadium 泉州体育中心	34,000	Quanzhou	China	East Asia		Local sports teams
213	Bunyodkor Stadium Bunyodkor Stadioni	34,000	Tashkent	Uzbekistan	Central Asia	Milliy Stadium	Bunyodkor, Uzbekistan national football team
214	Samsun Stadium	33,919	Samsun	Turkey	West Asia	Samsun Stadium	Samsunspor
215	M. Chinnaswamy Stadium ಎಂ ಚಿನ್ನಸ್ವಾಮಿ ಕ್ರೀಡಾಂಗಣ	33,800	Bengaluru	India	South Asia	M. Chinnaswamy Stadium	Karnataka cricket team, Royal Challengers Bangalore
216	Qinhuangdao Olympic Sports Centre Stadium 秦皇岛市奥体中心体育场	33,572	Qinhuangdao	China	East Asia	Qinhuangdao Olympic Sports Centre Stadium	Football at the 2008 Summer Olympics
217	Wankhede Stadium वानखेडे स्टेडियम	33,108	Mumbai	India	South Asia	Wankhede Stadium	Mumbai cricket team, Mumbai Indians
218	Hongkou Football Stadium 虹口足球场	33,060	Shanghai	China	East Asia	Hongkou Football Stadium	Shanghai Shenhua
219	Beijing Fengtai Stadium 丰台体育场	33,000	Beijing	China	East Asia	Beijing Fengtai Stadium	Local sports teams
220	MAZDA Zoom-Zoom Stadium Hiroshima MAZDA Zoom-Zoom スタジアム広島	33,000	Hiroshima	Japan	East Asia	Mazda Zoom-Zoom Stadium Hiroshima	Hiroshima Toyo Carp
221	Chang Arena สนามช้างอารีน่า	33,000	Buriram	Thailand	Southeast Asia	Chang Arena	Buriram United
222	Corendon Airlines Park	33,000	Antalya	Turkey	West Asia	Corendon Airlines Park	Antalyaspor
223	Diyarbakır Stadyumu	33,000	Diyarbakır	Turkey	West Asia	Diyarbakır Stadium	Diyarbekirspor
224	Kadir Has Stadyumu Kadir Has Stadyumu	32,864	Kayseri	Turkey	West Asia	Kayseri Kadir Has Stadium	Kayserispor, Kayseri Erciyesspor
225	Belluna Dome メットライフ西武ドーム	32,725	Tokorozawa	Japan	East Asia	MetLife Seibu Dome	Saitama Seibu Lions
226	Darul Aman Stadium Stadium Darul Aman ستاديوم دار الامن	32,387	Alor Setar	Malaysia	Southeast Asia	Darul Aman Stadium	Kedah FA, Kuala Muda Naza FC
227	Al-Madina Stadium ملعب المدينة الدولي	32,000	Baghdad	Iraq	West Asia		Iraq national football team
228	Fushun Leifeng Stadium 抚顺雷锋体育场	32,000	Fushun	China	East Asia		Local sports teams
229	Thuwunna Stadium သုဝဏ္ဏ လူငယ် လေ့ကျင့်ရေး ကွင်း	32,000	Yangon	Myanmar	Southeast Asia	Thuwunna Stadium	
230	Hailanjiang Stadium 海兰江体育场 해란강체육장	32,000	Longying	China	East Asia		Yanbian Baekdu Tigers
231	Yanghe Stadium 洋河体育场	32,000	Chongqing	China	East Asia		Local sports teams
232	Tai'an Sports Centre Stadium 泰安体育中心体育场	32,000	Tai'an	China	East Asia		Tai'an Tiankuang F.C.
233	Shanxi Provincial Stadium 山西省体育场	32,000	Taiyuan	China	East Asia		Local sports teams
234	Khalid ibn al-Walid Stadium ملعب خالد بن الوليد	32,000	Homs	Syria	West Asia	Khalid ibn al-Walid Stadium	Al-Karamah SC, Al-Wathba SC
235	Cangzhou Stadium 沧州体育场	31,836	Cangzhou	China	East Asia		
236	Xinxiang Stadium 新乡体育场	31,800	Xinxiang	China	East Asia		Local football teams
237	Weihai City Commercial Bank Stadium 威海市商业银行体育馆	31,800	Weihai	China	East Asia		Local sports teams
238	Teddy Stadium אצטדיון טדי	31,733	Jerusalem	Israel	West Asia		Israel national football team, Beitar Jerusalem, Hapoel Jerusalem
239	Tofiq Bahramov Stadium	31,200	Baku	Azerbaijan	West Asia		Qarabağ FK, Azerbaijan national football team
240	New Adana Stadium	30,960	Adana	Turkey	West Asia		
241	Sammy Ofer Stadium אצטדיון סמי עופר	30,950	Haifa	Israel	West Asia		Israel national football team, Maccabi Haifa, Hapoel Haifa
242	Bazhong Stadium 巴中体育场	30,812	Bazhong	China	East Asia		
243	Jinzhou Stadium 金州体育场	30,776	Dalian	China	East Asia		Dalian K'un City F.C.
244	Mandalarthiri Stadium မန္တလာသီရိ အားကစားကွင်း	30,589	Mandalay	Myanmar	Southeast Asia	Mandalarthiri Stadium	Myanmar women's national football team Yadanarbon FC
245	Rakuten Mobile Park Miyagi 楽天モバイルパーク宮城	30,508	Sendai	Japan	East Asia	Rakuten Mobile Park Miyagi	Tohoku Rakuten Eagles
246	Gaziantep Stadium	30,320	Gaziantep	Turkey	West Asia		
247	Jiangyin Stadium 江阴体育场	30,161	Jiangyin	China	East Asia		Local sports teams
248	Zozo Marine Stadium Zozoマリンスタジアム	30,118	Chiba	Japan	East Asia	Zozo Marine Stadium	Chiba Lotte Marines
249	Mersin Stadium	30,090	Mersin	Turkey	West Asia		
250	Langfang Stadium 廊坊体育场	30,040	Langfang	China	East Asia		Local sports teams
251	Chandigarh Hockey Stadium	30,000	Chandigarh	India	South Asia	Chandigarh Hockey Stadium	
252	Takhti Stadium ورزشگاه تختی	30,000	Tehran	Iran	West Asia		Naft Tehran, Iran U-23
253	Tainan County Stadium 新營運動公園田徑場	30,000	Tainan	Taiwan	East Asia	Tainan County Stadium	Local sports teams
254	Paljor Stadium	30,000	Gangtok	India	South Asia		United Sikkim
255	Jeonju Stadium 전주 종합 운동장	30,000	Jeonju	South Korea	East Asia	Jeonju Stadium	Local sports teams
256	Phnom Penh National Olympic Stadium ពហុកីឡាដ្ឋានជាតិអូឡាំពិក	30,000	Phnom Penh	Cambodia	Southeast Asia	A football match at the Olympic Stadium, Phnom Penh (Chetra Chap, 2015). (19104466005)	Cambodia national football team
257	Hagongda Stadium 哈工大体育场	30,000	Harbin	China	East Asia		Local football teams
258	Quzhou Stadium 衢州体育馆	30,000	Quzhou	China	East Asia		Local football teams
259	Xiangtan Sports Centre Stadium 湘潭体育中心	30,000	Xiangtan	China	East Asia		Local football teams
260	Hankou Cultural Sports Centre Stadium 汉口文化体育中心	30,000	Wuhan	China	East Asia		Local football teamss
261	Taizhou Sports Park Stadium 台州体育公园体育场	30,000	Taizhou	China	East Asia		Local football teams
262	Zoucheng Sports Centre Stadium 邹城体育中心体育场	30,000	Zoucheng	China	East Asia		Local football teams
263	Multan Cricket Stadium ملتان کرکٹ اسٹیڈیم	30,000	Multan	Pakistan	South Asia	Multan Cricket Stadium	Pakistan national cricket team, Multan Tigers
264	Tan Sri Dato Hj Hassan Yunos Stadium Stadium Tan Sri Dato' Haji Hassan Yunos ستاديوم سري داتو حاجي حسن يونس	30,000	Johor Bahru	Malaysia	Southeast Asia	Tan Sri Dato Hj Hassan Yunos Stadium	Johor Darul Ta'zim
265	Taoyuan City Stadium 桃園市立體育場	30,000	Taoyuan	Taiwan	East Asia	Taoyuan City Stadium	Local football teams
266	Chungcheng Stadium 中正運動場	30,000	Kaohsiung City	Taiwan	East Asia		Local football teams
267	Danzhou Sports Centre Stadium 儋州市体育中心体育场	30,000	Danzhou	China	East Asia		Local football teams
268	Banqiao Stadium 板橋體育場	30,000	Banciao City	Taiwan	East Asia	Banqiao Stadium	Local football teams
269	Yanggakdo Stadium 양각도경기장	30,000	Pyongyang	North Korea	East Asia		Closed since 2017
270	Karbala International Stadium ملعب كربلاء الدولي	30,000	Karbala	Iraq	West Asia	Karbala International Stadium	Karbala FC
271	Al-Najaf International Stadium ملعب النجف الدولي	30,000	Najaf	Iraq	West Asia		Al-Najaf FC
272	Al-Minaa Olympic Stadium ملعب الميناء الدولي	30,000	Basra	Iraq	West Asia	Al-Minaa Olympic Stadium	Al-Minaa SC
273	GMC Balayogi Athletic Stadium జి. ఎం. సి. బాలయోగి అథ్లెటిక్ స్టేడియం	30,000	Hyderabad	India	South Asia		Local cricket teams and athletics
274	Lal Bahadur Shastri Stadium లాల్ బహదూర్ శాస్త్రి స్టేడియం	30,000	Hyderabad	India	South Asia		Hyderabad cricket team, Hyderabad Heroes, Andhra Pradesh cricket team
275	Cần Thơ Stadium Sân vận động Cần Thơ	30,000	Cần Thơ	Vietnam	Southeast Asia		XSKT Cần Thơ
276	Khuman Lampak Main Stadium খুমন লাম্পাক ম্যান স্টেডিয়াম	30,000	Imphal	India	South Asia		local football teams and athletics
277	Higashiosaka Hanazono Rugby Stadium 東大阪市花園ラグビー場	30,000	Higashiōsaka	Japan	East Asia	Higashiosaka Hanazono Rugby Stadium	Kintetsu Liners, FC Osaka (JFL)
278	Sawai Mansingh Stadium सवाई मान सिंह स्टेडियम	30,000	Jaipur	India	South Asia	Indira Gandhi Athletic Stadium	Rajasthan Royals, Rajasthan cricket team
279	Dadoji Kondadev Stadium दादोजी कोंडदेव स्टेडियम	30,000	Thane	India	South Asia	Dadoji Kondadev Stadium	local football teams
280	Jawaharlal Nehru Stadium ஜவஹர்லால் நேரு ஸ்டேடியம்	30,000	Coimbatore	India	South Asia	Jawaharlal Nehru Stadium	local football teams
281	Al-Thawra Sports City Stadium مدينة الثورة الرياضية	30,000	Sana'a	Yemen	West Asia		Yemen national football team
282	Jinshan Sports Centre Stadium 金山足球场	30,000	Shanghai	China	East Asia		Local sports teams
283	Wuxi Sports Centre Stadium 无锡市体育中心	30,000	Wuxi	China	East Asia		Wuxi Wugo
284	Astana Arena Астана Арена	30,244	Astana	Kazakhstan	Central Asia	Astana Arena	FC Astana
285	Ha Tinh Sân vận động Hà Tĩnh	30,000	Hà Tĩnh	Vietnam	East Asia	Ha Tinh Stadium	Hong Linh Ha Tinh FC
286	Jiangning Sports Centre Stadium 江宁区体育中心	30,000	Nanjing	China	East Asia		Local sports teams
287	Handan City Sports Centre Stadium 邯郸市体育中心体育场	30,000	Handan	China	East Asia		Local sports teams
288	Tengzhou Olympic Centre Stadium 滕州体育中心体育馆	30,000	Tengzhou	China	East Asia		Local sports teams
289	Chiba Central Sports Centre Athletics Stadium 千葉県総合スポーツセンター陸上競技場	30,000	Chiba	Japan	East Asia		Local sports teams
290	Konoike Athletic Stadium 奈良市鴻ノ池陸上競技場	30,000	Nara	Japan	East Asia		Local sports teams
291	Coca-Cola West Sports Athletic Park コカ・コーラウエストスポーツパーク陸上競	30,000	Tottori	Japan	East Asia		Local sports teams
292	Okinawa Cellular Stadium 沖縄セルラースタジアム那覇	30,000	Naha	Japan	East Asia	Okinawa Cellular Stadium	Local sports teams
293	Hard Off Eco Stadium Niigata ハードオフ·エコスタジアム新潟	30,000	Niigata	Japan	East Asia	Hard Off Eco Stadium Niigata	Niigata Albirex Baseball Club
294	Rongcheng Stadium 荣成体育场	30,000	Rongcheng	China	East Asia		Local sports teams
295	Changshu Stadium 常熟体育场	30,000	Changshu	China	East Asia		Local sports teams
296	Kunshan Sports Centre Stadium 昆山体育中心体育场	30,000	Kunshan	China	East Asia	Kunshan Sports Centre Stadium	Local sports teams
297	Xiamen Sports Centre Stadium 厦门体育中心体育场	30,000	Xiamen	China	East Asia		Local sports teams
298	Yiyang Olympic Park 益阳奥林匹克公园	30,000	Yiyang	China	East Asia		Local sports teams
299	Mianyang Nanhe Sports Centre Stadium 绵阳南河体育中心体育场	30,000	Mianyang	China	East Asia		Local sports teams
300	Dazhou Xiwai Stadium 达州西外体育馆	30,000	Dazhou	China	East Asia		Local sports teams
301	Qingyuan Sports Centre Stadium 清远体育中心体育场	30,000	Qingyuan	China	East Asia		Local sports teams
302	Guru Nanak Stadium ਗੁਰੂ ਨਾਨਕ ਸਟੇਡੀਅਮ	30,000	Ludhiana	India	South Asia	Guru Nanak Stadium	
303	Banten International Stadium Banten International Stadium	30,000	Serang	Indonesia	Southeast Asia		Dewa United Banten
304	Moch. Soebroto Stadium Stadion Moch. Soebroto	30,000	Magelang	Indonesia	Southeast Asia	Moch. Soebroto Stadium	PPSM Magelang
305	Pakansari Stadium Stadion Pakansari	30,000	Bogor Regency	Indonesia	Southeast Asia	Pakansari Stadium	Persikabo Bogor
306	Stadion Patriot Chandrabhaga Stadion Patriot Chandrabhaga ᮞ᮪ᮒᮓᮤᮚᮧᮔ᮪ ᮕᮒᮢᮤᮚᮧᮒ᮪ ᮎᮔ᮪ᮓᮢᮘᮌ	30,000	Bekasi	Indonesia	Southeast Asia		Persipasi Bekasi, Bhayangkara FC
307	Sultan Agung Stadium Stadion Sultan Agung	30,000	Bantul	Indonesia	Southeast Asia	Sultan Agung Stadium	Persiba Bantul
308	Wibawa Mukti Stadium Stadion Wibawa Mukti	30,000	Bekasi Regency	Indonesia	Southeast Asia	Wibawa Mukti Stadium	Persikasi Bekasi
309	Abbasiyyin Stadium ملعب العباسيين	30,000	Damascus	Syria	West Asia	Abbasiyyin Stadium	Syria national football team
310	22 May Stadium استاد 22 مايو	30,000	Aden	Yemen	West Asia		Al-Tilal, Al-Shaab Ibb and Al-Ittihad Ibb
311	East Pyongyang Stadium 동 평양 경기장	30,000	Pyongyang	North Korea	East Asia		Local sports teams
312	Wunna Theikdi Stadium ဝဏ္ဏသိဒ္ဒိ အားကစားကွင်း	30,000	Naypyidaw	Myanmar	Southeast Asia	Wunna Theikdi Stadium	Nay Pyi Taw FC
313	Dushanbe Stadium	30,000	Dushanbe	(Tajikistan)			

== See also ==
- List of African stadiums by capacity
- List of European stadiums by capacity
- List of North American stadiums by capacity
- List of Oceanian stadiums by capacity
- List of South American stadiums by capacity
- List of association football stadiums by country
- Lists of stadiums
- Sports in Asia
