= List of association football stadiums by capacity =

The following is a list of football stadiums. They are ordered by their seating capacity, that is the maximum number of spectators that the stadium can accommodate in seated areas. Football stadiums with a capacity of 40,000 or more are included. That is the minimum capacity required for a stadium to host FIFA World Cup finals matches. Note that most sports venues with a capacity of at least 40,000 are used for association football. The list contains both stadiums used solely for football, and those used for other sports as well as football. Some stadiums are only used by a team for certain high attendance matches, like local derbies or cup games.

- List of African stadiums by capacity
- List of Asian stadiums by capacity
- List of European stadiums by capacity
- List of North American stadiums by capacity
- List of Oceanian stadiums by capacity
- List of South American stadiums by capacity

== Football stadiums by capacity ==
bold	Denotes that the stadium is, or was once, the largest association football stadium in the world.
♦	Denotes the largest association football stadium in the country or area.

List of association football stadiums by capacity
Rank	Stadium	Seating capacity	Region	Country	City	Images	Home team(s)
1	Rungrado 1st of May Stadium ♦	113,281	East Asia	North Korea	Pyongyang		Korea DPR national football team, Korea DPR women's national football team, April 25
2	Camp Nou ♦	99,354	Europe	Spain	Barcelona, Catalonia		FC Barcelona
3	FNB Stadium ♦	94,736	Africa	South Africa	Johannesburg, Gauteng		South Africa national football team, Kaizer Chiefs
4	New Administrative Capital Stadium ♦	93,940	Africa	Egypt	New Administrative Capital		Egypt national football team
5	Cotton Bowl Stadium	92,100	North America	United States	Dallas, Texas		Atlético Dallas, Dallas Trinity FC
6	Wembley Stadium ♦	90,000	Europe	England	London, England		England national football team
7	Lusail Stadium ♦	88,966	West Asia	Qatar	Lusail		Qatar national football team
8	Estadio Azteca ♦	87,523	North America	Mexico	Mexico City		América, Cruz Azul, Atlante, Mexico national football team
9	Bukit Jalil National Stadium ♦	87,411	Southeast Asia	Malaysia	Kuala Lumpur		Malaysia national football team
10	Borg El-Arab Stadium	86,000	Africa	Egypt	Alexandria		Egypt national football team, Al Ittihad, Smouha
11	Estadio Mâs Monumental ♦	85,018	South America	Argentina	Buenos Aires		Argentina national football team, River Plate
12	Salt Lake Stadium ♦	85,000	South Asia	India	Kolkata		India national football team, Mohun Bagan Super Giant, East Bengal FC, Mohammedan SC, Atlético de Kolkata
13	Stadium Australia	83,500	Oceania	Australia	Sydney, New South Wales		South Sydney Rabbitohs, Canterbury-Bankstown Bulldogs, New South Wales Blues, New South Wales Waratahs, Australia men's national soccer team, Australia national rugby union team
14	Estadio Santiago Bernabéu	83,186	Europe	Spain	Madrid		Real Madrid
15	Croke Park ♦	82,300	Europe	Ireland	Dublin		Gaelic Athletic Association, Dublin GAA
16	Jakarta International Stadium ♦	82,000	Southeast Asia	Indonesia	Jakarta		Persija Jakarta, Indonesia national football team
17	Signal Iduna Park ♦	81,365	Europe	Germany	Dortmund		Borussia Dortmund
18	Stade de France ♦	81,338	Europe	France	Saint-Denis		France national football team
19	Grand Sports Arena of the Luzhniki Olympic Complex ♦	81,000	Europe	Russia	Moscow		
20	Shah Alam Stadium	80,372	Southeast Asia	Malaysia	Shah Alam, Selangor		Selangor FA
21	Estadio Monumental ♦	80,093	South America	Peru	Lima		Club Universitario de Deportes
22	Stadio Giuseppe Meazza ♦	80,018	Europe	Italy	Milan, Lombardy		AC Milan and Internazionale
23	Guangdong Olympic Stadium ♦	80,012	East Asia	China	Guangzhou, Guangdong		
24	Hangzhou Olympic Sports Expo Centre Stadium	80,000	East Asia	China	Hangzhou, Zhejiang		
25	Stade des Martyrs ♦	80,000	Africa	DR Congo	Kinshasa		Congo DR national football team
26	Beijing National Stadium	80,000	East Asia	China	Beijing		
27	Maracanã ♦	78,838	South America	Brazil	Rio de Janeiro, Rio de Janeiro		CR Flamengo, Fluminense FC, Botafogo FR, CR Vasco da Gama
28	Azadi Stadium ♦	78,116	West Asia	Iran	Tehran		Iran national football team, Esteghlal FC, Persepolis FC
29	Stadion Utama Gelora Bung Karno	77,193	Southeast Asia	Indonesia	Jakarta		Indonesia national football team,
30	Atatürk Olimpiyat Stadyumu ♦	76,092	Europe	Turkey	Istanbul		
31	Old Trafford	76,000	Europe	England	Manchester, North West England		Manchester United
32	Tangier Grand Stadium	75,500	Africa	Morocco	Tangier		IR Tangier, Morocco national team
33	Allianz Arena	75,024	Europe	Germany	Munich		FC Bayern Munich
34	Naghsh-e-Jahan Stadium	75,000	West Asia	Iran	Isfahan		Sepahan FC
35	Bank of America Stadium	74,867	North America	United States	Charlotte, North Carolina		Carolina Panthers, Charlotte FC
36	Principality Stadium ♦	74,500	Europe	Wales	Cardiff		Wales national rugby union team
37	Olympiastadion	74,475	Europe	Germany	Berlin		Hertha BSC
38	Cairo International Stadium	74,100	Africa	Egypt	Cairo		Egypt national football team, Al Ahly, Zamalek
39	Estádio Nacional Mané Garrincha	72,788	South America	Brazil	Brasília, Distrito Federal		Brasília FC, Legião FC
40	Stadio Olimpico	72,698	Europe	Italy	Rome, Lazio		AS Roma, SS Lazio
41	Nissan Stadium ♦	72,327	East Asia	Japan	Yokohama, Kanagawa		Yokohama F. Marinos, Yokohama Eagles
42	Shanghai Stadium	72,000	East Asia	China	Shanghai		Shanghai Shenhua
43	Estadio La Cartuja de Sevilla	71,374	Europe	Spain	Seville		
44	Mercedes-Benz Stadium	71,000	North America	United States	Atlanta, Georgia		Atlanta United FC, Atlanta Falcons
45	Riyadh Air Metropolitano	70,692	Europe	Spain	Madrid		Atlético de Madrid
46	Olympic National Sports Complex Stadium ♦	70,050	Europe	Ukraine	Kyiv		Ukraine national football team, FC Dynamo Kyiv
47	Nou Mestalla	70,044	Europe	Spain	Valencia		Valencia CF
48	Seoul Olympic Stadium ♦	69,950	East Asia	South Korea	Seoul		
49	Bakı Olimpiya stadionu ♦	69,870	West Asia	Azerbaijan	Baku		Azerbaijan national football team
50	Olympic Stadium ♦	69,618	Europe	Greece	Marousi, Attica		Greece national football team
51	Prince Moulay Abdellah Stadium	68,700	Africa	Morocco	Rabat		Morocco national team, AS FAR
52	Olympiastadion München	69,250	Europe	Germany	Munich		
53	Lumen Field	69,000	North America	United States	Seattle, Washington		Seattle Sounders FC, Seattle Seahawks
54	Estadio Olímpico Universitario	68,954	North America	Mexico	Mexico City		UNAM Pumas
55	Gillette Stadium	68,756	North America	United States	Foxborough, Massachusetts		New England Patriots, New England Revolution
56	King Abdullah Sports City Stadium ♦	68,560	West Asia	Saudi Arabia	Jeddah		Saudi Arabia national football team, Al-Ahli Saudi FC, Al-Ittihad Saudi Club
57	Gazprom Arena	68,134	Europe	Russia	Saint Petersburg		FC Zenit Saint Petersburg
58	Estádio do Sport Lisboa e Benfica ♦	68,100	Europe	Portugal	Lisbon		Benfica
59	National Stadium	68,000	East Asia	Japan	Tokyo		
60	Orange Vélodrome	67,394	Europe	France	Marseille		Olympique de Marseille
61	Puskás Aréna ♦	67,215	Europe	Hungary	Budapest		Hungary national football team
62	Scottish Gas Murrayfield Stadium	67,144	Europe	Scotland	Edinburgh		Scotland national rugby union team
63	Stade Mohammed V ♦	67,000	Africa	Morocco	Casablanca		Wydad, Raja, Morocco national team
64	MorumBIS	66,975	South America	Brazil	São Paulo, São Paulo		São Paulo FC
65	Yadegar-e-Emam Stadium	66,833	West Asia	Iran	Tabriz		Tractor S.C.
66	Seoul World Cup Stadium	66,704	East Asia	South Korea	Seoul		FC Seoul
67	Daegu Stadium	66,422	East Asia	South Korea	Daegu		Daegu FC
68	Workers' Stadium	66,161	East Asia	China	Beijing		Beijing Guoan, China national football team
69	London Stadium	66,000	Europe	England	London		West Ham United
70	Olympic Stadium ♦	65,255	North America	Canada	Montreal, Quebec		CF Montréal
71	Basra International Stadium ♦	65,227	West Asia	Iraq	Basra		Iraq national football team
72	Estadio Metropolitano Roberto Meléndez ♦	65,000	South America	Colombia	Barranquilla		Colombia national football team, Atlético Junior
73	Stade du 5 Juillet ♦	64,200	Africa	Algeria	Algiers		Algeria national football team, MC Alger, USM Alger, CR Belouizdad, Paradou AC
74	Castelão	63,903	South America	Brazil	Fortaleza, Ceará		Ceará SC, Fortaleza EC
75	Saitama Stadium 2002	63,700	East Asia	Japan	Saitama		Urawa Red Diamonds, Saitama Wild Knights
76	Dalian Suoyuwan Football Stadium	63,677	Asia	China	Dalian		Dalian Yingbo
77	Oakland–Alameda County Coliseum	63,132	North America	United States	Oakland, California		Oakland Roots SC, Oakland Soul SC, San Francisco Unicorns
78	Ellis Park Stadium	62,567	Africa	South Africa	Johannesburg, Gauteng		Orlando Pirates FC, Emirates Johannesburg Lions
79	Tottenham Hotspur Stadium	62,303	Europe	England	London		Tottenham Hotspur
80	VELTINS-Arena	62,271	Europe	Germany	Gelsenkirchen		FC Schalke 04
81	Yizhong Sports Centre Stadium	62,000	East Asia	China	Qingdao, Shandong		Qingdao Jonoon FC
82	Estádio Governador Magalhães Pinto	61,846	South America	Brazil	Belo Horizonte, Minas Gerais		Atlético Mineiro, Cruzeiro EC
83	King Fahd International Stadium	61,781	West Asia	Saudi Arabia	Riyadh		Saudi Arabia national football team, Al-Hilal, Al-Nassr, Al-Shabab
84	Soldier Field	61,500	North America	United States	Chicago, Illinois		Chicago Bears, Chicago Fire FC
85	Nanjing Olympic Sports Centre Stadium	61,443	East Asia	China	Nanjing, Jiangsu		
86	Anfield	61,276	Europe	England	Liverpool, England		Liverpool FC
87	Estadio Benito Villamarín	60,720	Europe	Spain	Seville		Real Betis
88	Abuja Stadium ♦	60,491	Africa	Nigeria	Abuja		Nigeria national football team
89	MHPArena	60,469	Europe	Germany	Stuttgart		VfB Stuttgart
90	Celtic Park ♦	60,411	Europe	Scotland	Glasgow		Celtic FC
91	Estadio de la UNSA	60,370	South America	Peru	Arequipa		FBC Melgar
92	Emirates Stadium	60,338	Europe	England	London		Arsenal
93	Shenzhen Universiade Sports Centre Stadium	60,334	East Asia	China	Shenzhen, Guangdong		
94	Estadio Centenario ♦	60,235	South America	Uruguay	Montevideo		Uruguay national football team
95	Estádio José do Rego Maciel	60,044	South America	Brazil	Recife, Pernambuco		Santa Cruz FC
96	Stade Léopold Sédar Senghor ♦	60,000	Africa	Senegal	Dakar		Senegal national football team, ASC Jeanne d'Arc
97	Al-Bayt Stadium	60,000	West Asia	Qatar	Al-Khor		
98	Benjamin Mkapa National Stadium ♦	60,000	Africa	Tanzania	Dar es-Salaam		Tanzania national football team, Young Africans
99	Hefei Olympic Sports Centre Stadium	60,000	East Asia	China	Hefei, Anhui		Anhui Jiufang
100	Jaber al-Ahmad International Stadium ♦	60,000	West Asia	Kuwait	Kuwait City		Kuwait national football team
101	Hammadi Agrebi Stadium ♦	60,000	Africa	Tunisia	Tunis		Tunisia national football team
102	Jawaharlal Nehru Stadium	60,000	South Asia	India	New Delhi		SC Delhi, Punjab FC
103	Mogadishu Stadium ♦	60,000	Africa	Somalia	Mogadishu		Somalia national football team
104	National Heroes Stadium ♦	60,000	Africa	Zambia	Lusaka		Zambian national football team
105	Odi Stadium	60,000	Africa	South Africa	Mabopane, Gauteng		
106	Morodok Techo National Stadium	60,000	Southeast Asia	Cambodia	Phnom Penh		Cambodia national football team
107	Shenyang Olympic Sports Centre Stadium	60,000	East Asia	China	Shenyang, Liaoning		
108	Optus Stadium	60,000	Oceania	Australia	Perth, Western Australia		Perth Glory FC, Fremantle Dockers, West Coast Eagles
109	National Sports Stadium ♦	60,000	Africa	Zimbabwe	Harare		Zimbabwe national football team
110	Stade Tata Raphaël ♦	60,000	Africa	DR Congo	Kinshasa		AS Vita Club, DC Motema Pembe
111	Estadio Monumental Isidro Romero Carbo ♦	59,283	South America	Ecuador	Guayaquil		Barcelona Sporting Club
112	Groupama Stadium	59,186	Europe	France	Décines-Charpieu		Olympique Lyonnais
113	Chongqing Olympic Sports Centre Stadium	58,680	East Asia	China	Chongqing		
114	Kazimierz Górski National Stadium ♦	58,580	Europe	Poland	Warsaw		Poland national football team
115	Stadio San Nicola	58,270	Europe	Italy	Bari, Apulia		SSC Bari
116	Deutsche Bank Park	58,000	Europe	Germany	Frankfurt		Eintracht Frankfurt
117	La Bombonera	57,200	South America	Argentina	Buenos Aires		CA Boca Juniors
118	Volksparkstadion	57,030	Europe	Germany	Hamburg		Hamburger SV
119	Estadio Mario Alberto Kempes	57,000	South America	Argentina	Córdoba		Talleres de Córdoba, some Belgrano de Córdoba matches.
120	Jinan Olympic Sports Centre Stadium	56,808	East Asia	China	Jinan, Shandong		Shandong Taishan
121	Estadio Jalisco	56,713	North America	Mexico	Guadalajara, Jalisco		Atlas
122	Commonwealth Stadium	56,302	North America	Canada	Edmonton, Alberta		Edmonton Elks, Canadian men's and women's national teams
123	19 May 1956 Stadium	56,000	Africa	Algeria	Annaba		USM Annaba
124	Estadi Olímpic Lluís Companys	55,926	Europe	Spain	Barcelona, Catalonia		
125	El Cilindro	55,880	South America	Argentina	Avellaneda		Racing
126	Arena do Grêmio	55,662	South America	Brazil	Porto Alegre, Rio Grande do Sul		Grêmio FBPA
127	Arena Națională ♦	55,634	Europe	Romania	Bucharest		Romania national football team
128	Stadion Rajko Mitić ♦	55,538	Europe	Serbia	Belgrade		Red Star Belgrade, Serbia national football team
129	Stadion Śląski	55,211	Europe	Poland	Chorzów		Poland national football team, Ruch Chorzów
130	Etihad Stadium	55,097	Europe	England	Manchester, North West England		Manchester City
131	Moi International Sports Centre ♦	55,000	Africa	Kenya	Nairobi		Kenya national football team
132	National Stadium ♦	55,000	Southeast Asia	Singapore	Singapore		Singapore national football team
133	National Stadium ♦	55,000	East Asia	Taiwan	Kaohsiung		Chinese Taipei national football team
134	He Long Stadium	55,000	East Asia	China	Changsha, Hunan		
135	Cape Town Stadium	55,000	Africa	South Africa	Cape Town, Western Cape		Cape Town City FC, DHL Western Cape Stormers
136	Plovdiv Stadium ♦	55,000	Europe	Bulgaria	Plovdiv		
137	Johan Cruijff Arena ♦	54,990	Europe	Netherlands	Amsterdam		AFC Ajax
138	Tianhe Stadium	54,856	East Asia	China	Guangzhou, Guangdong		
139	Stadio Diego Armando Maradona	54,726	Europe	Italy	Naples		SSC Napoli
140	Tianjin Olympic Sports Centre Stadium	54,696	East Asia	China	Tianjin		Tianjin Teda
141	MERKUR SPIEL-ARENA	54,600	Europe	Germany	Düsseldorf		Fortuna Düsseldorf
142	Boris Paitchadze Dinamo Arena ♦	54,549	West Asia	Georgia	Tbilisi		Georgia national football team, FC Dinamo Tbilisi
143	Wuhan Sports Centre Stadium	54,357	East Asia	China	Wuhan, Hubei		
144	BC Place Stadium	54,320	North America	Canada	Vancouver, British Columbia		Vancouver Whitecaps FC, BC Lions
145	Hrazdan Stadium ♦	54,208	West Asia	Armenia	Yerevan		FC Ararat Yerevan, Ulisses FC
146	War Memorial Stadium	54,120	North America	United States	Little Rock, Arkansas		Little Rock Rangers
147	BORUSSIA-PARK	54,057	Europe	Germany	Mönchengladbach		Borussia Mönchengladbach
148	Moses Mabhida Stadium	54,000	Africa	South Africa	Durban, KwaZulu-Natal		AmaZulu FC, Cell C Durban Sharks
149	RAMS Park	53,978	Europe	Turkey	Istanbul		Galatasaray
150	Busan Asiad Main Stadium	53,864	East Asia	South Korea	Busan		Busan IPark
151	Estádio Estadual Jornalista Edgar Augusto Proença	53,645	South America	Brazil	Belém, Pará		Paysandu SC, Clube do Remo, Tuna Luso Brasileira, SC Belem
152	Estadio Único Diego Armando Maradona	53,600	South America	Argentina	La Plata		
153	Adelaide Oval	53,500	Oceania	Australia	Adelaide, South Australia		Adelaide Crows, Port Adelaide Power
154	Docklands Stadium	53,359	Oceania	Australia	Melbourne, Victoria		Western Bulldogs, Essendon, St. Kilda, Carlton, North Melbourne
155	Estádio Municipal João Havelange	53,350	South America	Brazil	Uberlândia, Minas Gerais		Uberlânia EC
156	San Mamés	53,332	Europe	Spain	Bilbao		Athletic Bilbao
157	Aleppo International Stadium ♦	53,200	West Asia	Syria	Aleppo		Al-Ittihad
158	Estadio Nacional	53,086	South America	Peru	Lima		Peru national football team
159	Hill Dickinson Stadium	52,769	Europe	England	Liverpool		Everton FC
160	Huanglong Stadium	52,672	East Asia	China	Hangzhou, Zhejiang		Zhejiang Professional
161	Suncorp Stadium	52,500	Oceania	Australia	Brisbane, Queensland		Brisbane Broncos, Queensland Maroons, Brisbane Roar FC, Queensland Reds
162	St. James' Park	52,405	Europe	England	Newcastle upon Tyne, North East		Newcastle United
163	Estádio José Alvalade	52,095	Europe	Portugal	Lisbon		Sporting CP
164	Kings Park Stadium	52,000	Africa	South Africa	Durban, KwaZulu-Natal		Lamontville Golden Arrows, Cell C Durban Sharks
165	Newlands Stadium	51,900	Africa	South Africa	Cape Town, Western Cape		
166	Hampden Park	51,866	Europe	Scotland	Glasgow		Scotland national football team, Queen's Park
167	Estadio Monumental de Maturín ♦	51,796	South America	Venezuela	Maturín		Monagas Sport Club
168	Loftus Versfeld Stadium	51,762	Africa	South Africa	Pretoria, Gauteng		SuperSport United and Vodacom Pretoria Bulls
169	Aviva Stadium ♦	51,711	Europe	Ireland	Dublin		Leinster Rugby, Republic of Ireland national football team, Ireland national rugby union team
170	Ibrox Stadium	51,700	Europe	Scotland	Glasgow		Rangers FC
171	Guiyang Olympic Sports Centre Stadium	51,638	East Asia	China	Guiyang, Guizhou		
172	Hohhot City Stadium	51,632	East Asia	China	Hohhot, Inner Mongolia		
173	Rajamangala National Stadium ♦	51,552	Southeast Asia	Thailand	Bangkok		Thailand national football team
174	Donbas Arena	51,504	Europe	Ukraine	Donetsk		
175	İzmir Atatürk Stadyumu	51,295	West Asia	Turkey	İzmir		Altay SK, Göztepe AŞ
176	Stadion Feijenoord	51,117	Europe	Netherlands	Rotterdam		Feyenoord
177	Estadio BBVA	53,529	North America	Mexico	Monterrey		CF Monterrey
178	Ghadir Stadium	51,000	West Asia	Iran	Ahvaz		Foolad FC
179	Estádio José Pinheiro Borda	50,942	South America	Brazil	Porto Alegre. Rio Grande do Sul		SC Internacional
180	Shizuoka Stadium	50,889	East Asia	Japan	Fukuroi, Shizuoka		Júbilo Iwata, Shimizu S-Pulse, Shizuoka Blue Revs
181	Ernst-Happel-Stadion ♦	50,865	Europe	Austria	Vienna		Austria national football team
182	Hocine Ait Ahmed Stadium	50,766	Africa	Algeria	Tizi Ouzou		JS Kabylie
183	Estadio Cuauhtémoc	50,754	North America	Mexico	Puebla		Puebla FC
184	Phoenix Hill Football Stadium	50,695	Asia	China	Chengdu		Chengdu Rongcheng
185	Strawberry Arena ♦	50,653	Europe	Sweden	Solna		Sweden men's national football team, AIK Fotboll
186	Ülker Stadyumu	50,509	West Asia	Turkey	Istanbul		Fenerbahçe
187	Stade Pierre-Mauroy	50,186	Europe	France	Villeneuve-d'Ascq		Lille OSC
188	Stade Roi Baudouin ♦	50,122	Europe	Belgium	Brussels		Belgium national football team
189	Shaanxi Province Stadium	50,100	East Asia	China	Xi'an, Shaanxi		
190	Ajinomoto Stadium	50,100	East Asia	Japan	Chofu, Tokyo		FC Tokyo, Tokyo Verdy, Tokyo Sungoliath, Toshiba Brave Lupus Tokyo
191	Estádio do Dragão	50,033	Europe	Portugal	Porto		FC Porto
192	Casa de Apostas Arena Fonte Nova	50,025	South America	Brazil	Salvador, Bahia		EC Bahia
193	Kai Tak Stadium ♦	50,000	East Asia	Hong Kong	Kowloon City		Hong Kong national football team
194	Stade Olympique de Sousse	50,000	Africa	Tunisia	Sousse		Étoile du Sahel
195	RheinEnergieSTADION	50,000	Europe	Germany	Cologne		1. FC Köln
196	Harbin Sports City Centre Stadium	50,000	East Asia	China	Harbin, Heilongjiang		
197	Greenfield International Stadium	50,000	South Asia	India	Trivandrum		
198	EMS Stadium	50,000	South Asia	India	Kozhikode		India national football team, Gokulam Kerala FC
199	KD Singh Babu Stadium	50,000	South Asia	India	Lucknow		
200	Eden Park ♦	50,000	Oceania	New Zealand	Auckland		Auckland Blues, New Zealand Warriors
201	Estádio 11 de Novembro ♦	50,000	Africa	Angola	Luanda		Angola national football team, Primeiro de Agosto, Petro Luanda
202	Henan Provincial Stadium	50,000	East Asia	China	Zhengzhou, Henan		
203	Jiangxi Olympic Sports Center	50,000	East Asia	China	Nanchang, Jiangxi		
204	Max-Morlock-Stadion	50,000	Europe	Germany	Nuremberg		1. FC Nürnberg
205	June 11 Stadium ♦	50,000	Africa	Libya	Tripoli		Libya, Al-Ahly SC, Al-Ittihad Tripoli, Al-Madina SC
206	Xinjiang Sports Centre Stadium	50,000	East Asia	China	Urumqi, Xinjiang		
207	Kim Il-sung Stadium	50,000	East Asia	North Korea	Pyongyang		Pyongyang City Sports Club
208	EDION Stadium Hiroshima	50,000	East Asia	Japan	Hiroshima		Sanfrecce Hiroshima
209	Pars Shiraz Stadium	50,000	West Asia	Iran	Shiraz		Fajr Sepasi Shiraz FC
210	Stade du 26 mars ♦	50,000	Africa	Mali	Bamako		Stade Malien
211	Stade Abdoulaye Wade	50,000	Africa	Senegal	Dakar		Senegal national football team
212	Sultan Mizan Zainal Abidin Stadium	50,000	Southeast Asia	Malaysia	Kuala Terengganu		Terengganu FA
213	Estadio Akron	49,850	North America	Mexico	Guadalajara		C.D. Guadalajara
214	Levy Mwanawasa Stadium	49,800	Africa	Zambia	Lusaka		Zesco United
215	Fritz-Walter-Stadion	49,780	Europe	Germany	Kaiserslautern		1. FC Kaiserslautern
216	Estadio José Amalfitani	49,540	South America	Argentina	Buenos Aires		CA Vélez Sársfield
217	Camille Chamoun Sports City Stadium ♦	49,500	West Asia	Lebanon	Beirut		Lebanon national football team, Al Ahed FC, Al Ansar FC, Nejmeh SC
218	Mestalla	49,430	Europe	Spain	Valencia		Valencia CF
219	Miyagi Stadium	49,133	East Asia	Japan	Rifu, Miyagi		Vegalta Sendai
220	Incheon Munhak Stadium	49,084	East Asia	South Korea	Incheon		
221	Heinz-von-Heiden-Arena	49,000	Europe	Germany	Hanover		Hannover 96
222	Parc des Princes	48,712	Europe	France	Paris		Paris Saint-Germain
223	Stadium of Light	48,707	Europe	England	Sunderland, Tyne and Wear		Sunderland AFC
224	Estadio Nacional ♦	48,665	South America	Chile	Santiago		Chile national football team, CF Universidad de Chile
225	Nelson Mandela Bay Stadium	48,459	Africa	South Africa	Port Elizabeth, Eastern Cape		Chippa United FC
226	Estadio Tomás Adolfo Ducó	48,314	South America	Argentina	Buenos Aires		CA Huracán
227	Jinnah Sports Stadium ♦	48,200	South Asia	Pakistan	Islamabad		Pakistan national football team
228	Choctaw Stadium	48,114	North America	United States	Arlington, Texas		North Texas SC
229	Estadio Libertadores de América	48,069	South America	Argentina	Avellaneda		Club Atlético Independiente
230	Free State Stadium	48,000	Africa	South Africa	Bloemfontein, Free State		Bloemfontein Celtic, Toyota Cheetahs
231	Nagai Stadium	47,816	East Asia	Japan	Osaka		Cerezo Osaka, NTT DoCoMo Red Hurricanes Osaka
232	Neo Química Arena	47,605	South America	Brazil	São Paulo, São Paulo		Corinthians
233	Rogers Centre	47,568	North America	Canada	Toronto, Ontario		Toronto FC, Toronto Argonauts
234	Estadio Monumental	47,347	South America	Chile	Santiago		Colo-Colo
235	Yankee Stadium	47,309	North America	United States	New York City, New York		New York City FC, New York Yankees
236	Stadio Artemio Franchi	47,282	Europe	Italy	Florence		ACF Fiorentina
237	Protective Stadium	47,100	North America	United States	Birmingham, Alabama		Birmingham Legion FC, Birmingham Stallions, UAB Blazers football
238	Estadio Ciudad de Lanús – Néstor Díaz Pérez	47,027	South America	Argentina	Lanús		CA Lanús
239	Estádio Olímpico Nilton Santos	46,831	South America	Brazil	Rio de Janeiro, Rio de Janeiro		Botafogo FR
240	Itaipava Arena Pernambuco	46,154	South America	Brazil	São Lourenço da Mata, Pernambuco		Náutico
241	Arena MRV	46,000	South America	Brazil	Belo Horizonte, Minas Gerais		C Atlético Mineiro
242	Estádio Paulo Constantino	45,954	South America	Brazil	Presidente Prudente, São Paulo		Grêmio Prudente
243	Estadio Atanasio Girardot	45,739	South America	Colombia	Medellín		Atlético Nacional, Independiente Medellín
244	Amahoro Stadium ♦	45,508	Africa	Rwanda	Kigali		Rwanda national football team
245	Adrar Stadium	45,480	Africa	Morocco	Agadir		Hassania Agadir, Morocco national team
246	Lukoil Arena	45,360	Europe	Russia	Moscow		Spartak Moscow
247	Grand stade de Marrakech	45,240	Africa	Morocco	Marrakesh		Kawkab Marrakech, Morocco national team
248	Mandela National Stadium ♦	45,202	Africa	Uganda	Kampala		Uganda national football team
249	Tarczyński Arena Wrocław	45,105	Europe	Poland	Wrocław		Śląsk Wrocław
250	Kazan Arena	45,105	Europe	Russia	Kazan		Rubin Kazan
251	Estadio Inca Garcilaso de la Vega	45,056	South America	Peru	Cusco		CS Cienciano, Deportivo Garcilaso, Cusco FC
252	Sanya Sports Centre Egret Stadium	45,000	East Asia	China	Sanya		
253	24 February 1956 Stadium	45,000	Africa	Algeria	Sidi Bel Abbès		USM Bel Abbès
254	Estádio da Machava ♦	45,000	Africa	Mozambique	Maputo		Mozambique national football team
255	Stadion Gelora Bung Tomo	45,000	Southeast Asia	Indonesia	Surabaya, East Java		Persebaya Surabaya
256	Stadion Harapan Banga	45,000	Southeast Asia	Indonesia	Banda Aceh, Aceh		Persiraja, Aceh United
257	Estadio General Pablo Rojas ♦	45,000	South America	Paraguay	Asunción		Club Cerro Porteño
258	Latakia Sports City Stadium	45,000	West Asia	Syria	Latakia		
259	Zibo Sports Centre Stadium	45,000	East Asia	China	Zibo, Shandong		
260	Weifang Sports Centre Stadium	45,000	East Asia	China	Weifang, Shandong		
261	Yantai Sports Park Stadium	45,000	East Asia	China	Yantai, Shandong		
262	Stadium Tuanku Abdul Rahman	45,000	Southeast Asia	Malaysia	Seremban		ATM FA, Negeri Sembilan
263	Stade du Complexe sportif de Fès	45,000	Africa	Morocco	Fes		Wydad de Fès, Maghreb de Fès, Morocco national team
264	Lagos National Stadium	45,000	Africa	Nigeria	Lagos		Nigeria national football team
265	Egyptian Army Stadium	45,000	Africa	Egypt	Suez		
266	Toyota Stadium	45,000	East Asia	Japan	Toyota City, Aichi		Nagoya Grampus, Toyota Verblitz
267	Zayed Sports City Stadium	45,000	West Asia	United Arab Emirates	Abu Dhabi		
268	Red Bull Arena	44,345	Europe	Germany	Leipzig		RB Leipzig
269	Estádio Governador Alberto Tavares Silva	44,200	South America	Brazil	Teresina		River AC, EC Flamengo, Piauí EC, SE Tiradentes, Auto EC
270	Estádio Universitário Pedro Pedrossian	44,200	South America	Brazil	Campo Grande, Mato Grosso do Sul		EC Comercial, Operário FC
271	Ulsan Munsu Football Stadium	44,102	East Asia	South Korea	Ulsan		Ulsan HD FC
272	Arena Pantanal	44,097	South America	Brazil	Cuiabá, Mato Grosso		Cuiabá, Mixto EC
273	Arena da Amazônia	44,000	South America	Brazil	Manaus, Amazonas		Nacional FC
274	Suwon World Cup Stadium	43,959	East Asia	South Korea	Suwon		Suwon Samsung Bluewings
275	Stadion Utama Riau	43,923	Southeast Asia	Indonesia	Pekanbaru, Riau		PSPS Pekanbaru
276	Estadio Ramón Sánchez Pizjuán	43,864	Europe	Spain	Seville		Sevilla FC
277	Allianz Parque	43,713	South America	Brazil	São Paulo, São Paulo		SE Palmeiras
278	Shandong Provincial Stadium	43,700	East Asia	China	Jinan, Shandong		
279	Polsat Plus Arena Gdańsk	43,615	Europe	Poland	Gdańsk		Lechia Gdańsk
280	Estadio Pedro Bidegain	43,494	South America	Argentina	Buenos Aires		CA San Lorenzo de Almagro
281	Stadion Miejski w Poznaniu	43,269	Europe	Poland	Poznań		Lech Poznań, Warta Poznań
282	Vasil Levski National Stadium	43,230	Europe	Bulgaria	Sofia		Bulgaria national football team
283	Estadio Universidad San Marcos	43,000	South America	Peru	Lima		Deportivo Universidad San Marcos
284	Ullevi	43,000	Europe	Sweden	Gothenburg		Sweden women's national football team
285	Jinzhou Binhai Sports Centre Stadium	43,000	East Asia	China	Jinzhou		
286	Estadio General Santander	42,901	South America	Colombia	Cúcuta		Cúcuta Deportivo
287	Villa Park	43,205	Europe	England	Birmingham, West Midlands		Aston Villa
288	Perak Stadium	42,500	Southeast Asia	Malaysia	Perak		Perak FA
289	Jeonju World Cup Stadium	42,477	East Asia	South Korea	Jeonju		Jeonbuk Hyundai Motors FC
290	Ligga Arena	42,372	South America	Brazil	Curitiba, Paraná		Athletico Paranaense
291	Weserstadion	42,358	Europe	Germany	Bremen		SV Werder Bremen
292	Denka Big Swan Stadium	42,300	East Asia	Japan	Niigata, Niigata		Albirex Niigata
293	Estadio Olimpico Metropolitano de Mérida	42,200	South America	Venezuela	Mérida		Estudiantes de Mérida
294	Daejeon World Cup Stadium	42,176	East Asia	South Korea	Daejeon		Daejeon Citizen
295	Matmut ATLANTIQUE	42,115	Europe	France	Bordeaux		FC Girondins de Bordeaux
296	Helsingin Olympiastadion ♦	42,062	Europe	Finland	Helsinki		Finland national football team
297	Estádio Serra Dourada	42,000	South America	Brazil	Goiânia, Goiás		Goiás Esporte Clube, Vila Nova, Atlético Goianiense
298	Estadio Deportivo Cali	42,000	South America	Colombia	Cali		Deportivo Cali
299	Estadio Modelo Alberto Spencer	42,000	South America	Ecuador	Guayaquil		Club Sport Patria, Club Deportivo Everest, Panamá Sporting Club, Rocafuerte Fútbol Club
300	Estádio do Zimpeto	42,000	Africa	Mozambique	Maputo		Mozambique national football team
301	Chengdu Sports Centre Stadium	42,000	East Asia	China	Chengdu, Sichuan		
302	Royal Bafokeng Stadium	42,000	Africa	South Africa	Phokeng, North West		
303	Estadio Universitario	42,000	North America	Mexico	San Nicolás de los Garza		Tigres de la UANL
304	Estadio Brigadier General Estanislao López	42,000	South America	Argentina	Santa Fe		Club Atlético Colón
305	Estadio Marcelo Bielsa	42,000	South America	Argentina	Rosario		Newell's Old Boys
306	Stade Geoffroy-Guichard	41,965	Europe	France	Saint-Étienne		AS Saint-Étienne
307	Vodafone Park	41,903	Europe	Turkey	Istanbul		Beşiktaş J.K.
308	Peter Mokaba Stadium	41,733	Africa	South Africa	Polokwane		Polokwane City FC
309	Estadio Gigante de Arroyito	41,654	South America	Argentina	Rosario		Rosario Central
310	Estadio Cachamay	41,600	South America	Venezuela	Ciudad Guayana		Atlético Club Mineros de Guayana, AC Minervén FC
311	Estadio de Liga Deportiva Universitaria	41,596	South America	Ecuador	Quito		LDU
312	Allianz Stadium	41,507	Europe	Italy	Turin, Piedmont		Juventus FC
313	Sapporo Dome	41,484	East Asia	Japan	Sapporo, Hokkaido		Hokkaido Consadole Sapporo
314	Stamford Bridge	41,663	Europe	England	London		Chelsea
315	Goyang Stadium	41,311	East Asia	South Korea	Goyang		
316	Estadio Hernando Siles ♦	41,143	South America	Bolivia	La Paz		La Paz FC, Club Bolívar, The Strongest
317	Bingu National Stadium	41,100	Africa	Malawi	Lilongwe		Flames, Big Bullets FC
318	Mbombela Stadium	40,929	Africa	South Africa	Nelspruit, Mpumalanga		
319	Estadio José Pachencho Romero	40,800	South America	Venezuela	Maracaibo		Deportivo JBL del Zulia, Deportivo Rayo Zuliano
320	Stade Nelson Mandela	40,784	Africa	Algeria	Algiers		Algeria national football team
321	Kashima Football Stadium	40,728	East Asia	Japan	Kashima, Ibaraki		Kashima Antlers
322	Baba Yara Stadium ♦	40,528	Africa	Ghana	Kumasi		Asante Kotoko, King Faisal Babes
323	Estádio Major Antônio Couto Pereira	40,502	South America	Brazil	Curitiba, Paraná		Coritiba Foot Ball Club
324	Stage Front Stadium	40,500	Europe	Spain	Barcelona		RCD Espanyol
325	Estadio Metropolitano de fútbol de Lara	40,312	South America	Venezuela	Barquisimeto		Unión Lara
326	Estadio Malvinas Argentinas	40,268	South America	Argentina	Mendoza		Godoy Cruz Antonio Tomba
327	Stadion Lukas Enembe	40,263	Southeast Asia	Indonesia	Nolokla		Persipura Jayapura
328	Gwangju World Cup Stadium	40,245	East Asia	South Korea	Gwangju		Gwangju FC
329	Sân vận động Quốc gia Mỹ Đình ♦	40,192	Southeast Asia	Vietnam	Hanoi		Vietnam national football team
330	Goodison Park	40,157	Europe	England	Liverpool, North West		Everton FC Women
331	Estádio Governador João Castelo	40,149	South America	Brazil	São Luís, Maranhão		Sampaio Corrêa FC, Moto Club SL, Maranhão AC
332	Miloud Hadefi Stadium	40,143	Africa	Algeria	Oran		Algeria national football team, MC Oran
333	Estadio Campeón del Siglo	40,005	South America	Uruguay	Montevideo		Club Atlético Peñarol
334	Metalist Stadium	40,003	Europe	Ukraine	Kharkiv		FC Metalist Kharkiv, FC Shakhtar Donetsk
335	Anoeta Stadium	40,000	Europe	Spain	San Sebastián		Real Sociedad
336	Al-Janoub Stadium	40,000	West Asia	Qatar	Al-Wakrah		
337	Al-Thumama Stadium	40,000	West Asia	Qatar	Al-Thumama		
338	Ahmed Zabana Stadium	40,000	Africa	Algeria	Oran		MC Oran
339	Stadion Batakan	40,000	Southeast Asia	Indonesia	Balikpapan, East Kalimantan		Persiba Balikpapan
340	Ali La Pointe Stadium	40,000	Africa	Algeria	Algiers		MC Alger
341	Stadion Gelora Joko Samudro	40,000	Southeast Asia	Indonesia	Gresik, East Java		Gresik United
342	Fisht Olympic Stadium	40,000	Europe	Russia	Sochi		
343	Jawaharlal Nehru Stadium	40,000	South Asia	India	Kochi		Kerala Blasters, India national football team
344	Hang Jebat Stadium	40,000	Southeast Asia	Malaysia	Malacca		Melaka United
345	Hong Kong Stadium ♦	40,000	East Asia	Hong Kong	So Kon Po		South China AA
346	Stadium Negeri Pulau Pinang	40,000	Southeast Asia	Malaysia	Batu Kawan		Penang FA
347	Accra Sports Stadium	40,000	Africa	Ghana	Accra		Accra Hearts of Oak SC, Great Olympics
348	Sarawak Stadium	40,000	Southeast Asia	Malaysia	Kuching		Sarawak FA
349	Bogyoke Aung San Stadium ♦	40,000	Southeast Asia	Myanmar	Yangon		Yangon United FC
350	Resonac Dome Ōita	40,000	East Asia	Japan	Ōita		Ōita Trinita
351	Stadium Darul Makmur	40,000	Southeast Asia	Malaysia	Kuantan		Pahang FA
352	Khalifa International Stadium	40,000	West Asia	Qatar	Doha		Qatar national football team
353	Stade de l’Amitié sino-gabonaise ♦	40,000	Africa	Gabon	Libreville		Gabon national football team
354	Peoples Football Stadium	40,000	South Asia	Pakistan	Karachi		Pakistan national football team
355	JRD Tata Sports Complex Stadium	40,000	South Asia	India	Jamshedpur		Jamshedpur FC, Tata Football Academy
356	Bao'an Stadium	40,000	East Asia	China	Shenzhen, Guangdong		
357	Kunming Tuodong Sports Centre Stadium	40,000	East Asia	China	Kunming, Yunnan		China national football team
358	Taizhou Sports Centre Stadium	40,000	East Asia	China	Taizhou, Zhejiang		
359	Wuhu Olympic Stadium	40,000	East Asia	China	Wuhu, Anhui		
360	Huizhou Olympic Stadium	40,000	East Asia	China	Huizhou, Guangdong		

== See also ==
- Lists of stadiums
