= Hoeryong Stadium =

Sports venue in Hoeryong, North Korea

Coordinates: 42°25′41″N 129°45′23″E

Hoeryong Stadium is a stadium in Hoeryong, North Hamgyong Province, North Korea.

== See also ==
- List of football stadiums in North Korea
