= WUSA =

WUSA, Wusa, or wusa may refer to:

- Women's United Soccer Association (defunct), the world's first women's professional association football league, based in the United States
- WUSA (film), a 1970 drama film
- WUSA (TV), a television station (channel 9 digital) broadcasting in Washington, D.C., United States
- Wusa Road Stadium, a stadium in Suzhou, China
- WMTX, a radio station (100.7 FM) licensed to Tampa, Florida, United States, which used the call sign WUSA-FM from June 1986 to December 1996
- KARE (TV), a television station (channel 11 digital) licensed to Minneapolis, Minnesota, United States, which used the call sign WUSA from July 1985 to June 1986
- Wollongong Undergraduate Students' Association, the elected student representative organisation, for undergraduate students, at the University of Wollongong, Australia
- The Windows Update Standalone Installer (wusa.exe)
