= Hwangju Riverside Stadium =

Sports venue in Sariwon, North Korea

- Interactive map of Hwangju Riverside Stadium
- Location: Sariwon, North Korea
- Coordinates: 38°29′48″N 125°45′27″E
- Capacity: 7,500

Hwangju Riverside Stadium(황주강변경기장) is a multi-use stadium in Sariwon, North Korea. It is currently used mostly for football matches and hosts the home matches of Sariwon United. The stadium holds 7,500 people.

== See also ==
- List of football stadiums in North Korea
