= Haeju Stadium =

Stadium in North Korea

Coordinates: 38°02′03″N 125°43′09″E

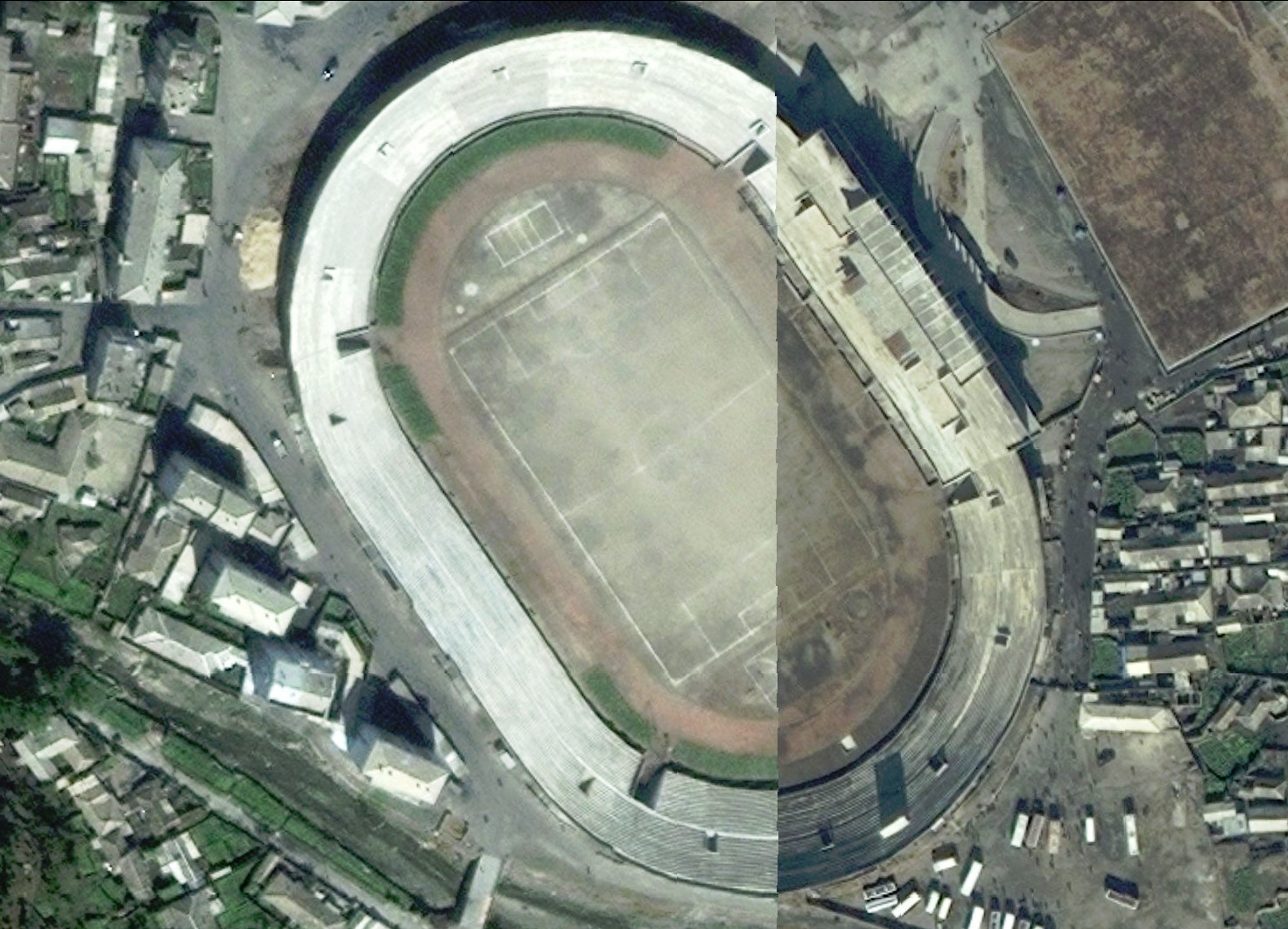
- Interactive map of Haeju Stadium

Haeju Stadium is a multi-use stadium in Haeju, North Korea. It is currently used mostly for football matches. The stadium holds 25,000 spectators.

== See also ==
- List of football stadiums in North Korea
