= Sinpung Stadium =

Sports venue in Wonsan, North Korea

Coordinates: 39°09′18″N 127°25′16″E

Sinp'ung Stadium (신풍경기장) is a multi-use stadium in Wŏnsan, North Korea, built in May 1965, with a capacity of 30,000 spectators.

== See also ==
- List of football stadiums in North Korea
