= Chandongja Park =

Sports venue in Chongjin, North Korea

Coordinates: 41°47′21″N 129°47′13″E

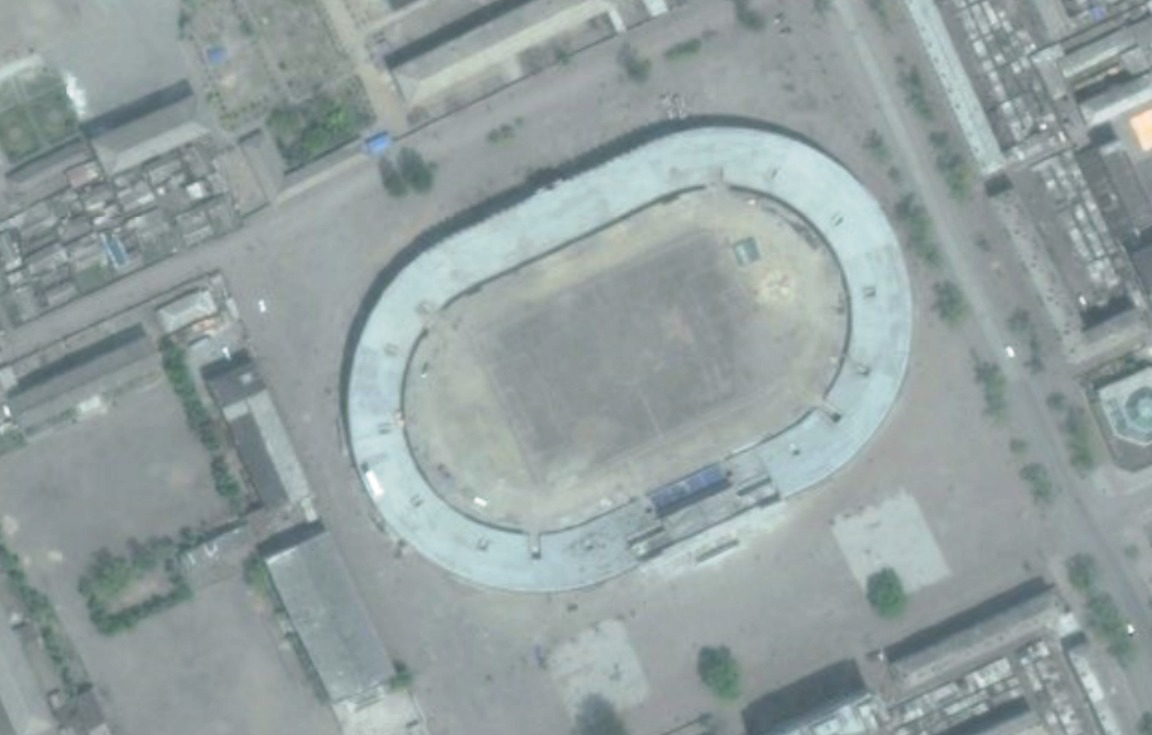
- Satellite view of the stadium
- Interactive map of Chandongja Park

Chandongja Park (Korean: 찬동자구장) is a multi-use stadium in Chongjin, North Korea. It is currently used mostly for football matches and hosts the home matches of Ch'ŏngjin Chandongcha. The stadium holds 15,000 spectators.

== See also ==
- List of football stadiums in North Korea
