= East Pyongyang Stadium =

Sports venue in Pyongyang, North Korea

Coordinates: 39.0016°N 125.8328°E

- Interactive map of East Pyongyang Stadium
- Full name: East Pyongyang Stadium
- Location: Pyongyang, North Korea
- Capacity: 30,000

Construction
- Opened: 1960

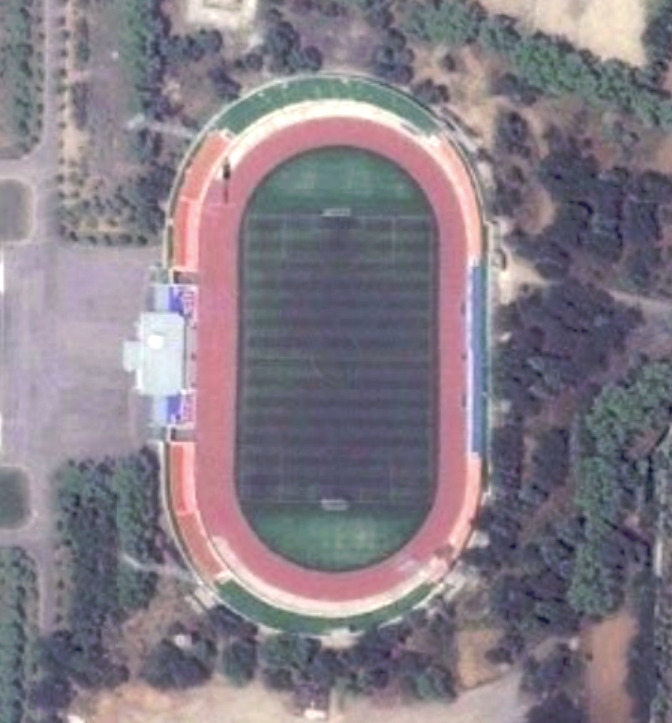
East Pyongyang Stadium JS bin.jpg

East Pyongyang Stadium (Korean: 동평양경기장) is a multi-purpose stadium in Pyongyang, North Korea. It is currently used mostly for football matches. The stadium holds 30,000 spectators and opened in 1960.

== See also ==
- List of football stadiums in North Korea
