= List of South American stadiums by capacity =

The following is an incomplete list of South American stadiums. They are ordered by their total capacity, that is the maximum number of spectators the stadium can accommodate (all-seater). Stadiums with a capacity of 30,000 or more are included.

Most large stadiums in South America are used for association football, with some having running tracks for athletics.

== List ==
Rank	Stadium	Capacity	Country	City	Tenants	Opening	Image
1	Estadio Más Monumental	85,018	Argentina	Buenos Aires	River Plate	1938	
2	Estadio Monumental	80,093	Peru	Lima	Universitario	2000	
3	Estádio Maracana	73,139	Brazil	Rio de Janeiro	Flamengo, Fluminense, Brazil national football team	1950	
4	Estádio Nacional Mané Garrincha	69,910	Brazil	Brasília	Brazil national football team	1974	
5	MorumBIS	66,671	Brazil	São Paulo	São Paulo	1960	
6	Estádio Governador Magalhães Pinto	66,658	Brazil	Belo Horizonte	Cruzeiro	1965	
7	Estadio Metropolitano Roberto Meléndez	65,000	Colombia	Barranquilla	Junior, Colombia national football team	1986	
8	Arena do Grêmio	60,540	Brazil	Porto Alegre	Grêmio	2012	
9	Estadio Centenario	60,235	Uruguay	Montevideo	Uruguay national football team	1930	
10	Estádio José do Rego Maciel	60,044	Brazil	Recife	Santa Cruz	1972	
11	Estadio Alberto José Armando	58,305	Argentina	Buenos Aires	Boca Juniors	1940	
12	Estádio Governador Plácido Castelo	57,876	Brazil	Fortaleza	Ceará, Fortaleza	1973	
13	Estadio Monumental Banco Pichincha	57,267	Ecuador	Guayaquil	Barcelona Sporting Club	1987	
14	Estadio Mario Alberto Kempes	57,000	Argentina	Córdoba	Talleres, Belgrano, Instituto	1978	
15	Estádio Estadual Jornalista Edgar Augusto Proença	53,645	Brazil	Belém	Paysandu, Remo	1978	
16	Estádio Municipal João Havelange	53,350	Brazil	Uberlândia	Uberlândia	1982	
17	Estadio Único Diego Armando Maradona	53,000	Argentina	La Plata	Argentina national football team	2003	
18	Estádio Governador Alberto Tavares Silva	52,296	Brazil	Teresina	Flamengo do Piauí	1951	
19	Estadio Deportivo Cali	52,000	Colombia	Cali	Deportivo Cali	2010	
20	Estadio Monumental de Maturín	51,796	Venezuela	Maturín	Monagas	2007	
21	Estadio Presidente Perón	50,880	Argentina	Avellaneda	Racing	1950	
22	Estádio Serra Dourada	50,049	Brazil	Goiânia	Goiás, Vila Nova	1975	
23	Estadio Libertadores de América	49,592	Argentina	Avellaneda	Independiente	1928	
24	Estadio José Amalfitani	49,540	Argentina	Buenos Aires	Vélez Sársfield	1951	
25	Estádio Beira-Rio	49,055	Brazil	Porto Alegre	Internacional	1969	
26	Estadio Marcelo Bielsa	49,000	Argentina	Rosario	Newell's Old Boys	1911	
27	Estadio Tomás Adolfo Ducó	48,314	Argentina	Buenos Aires	Huracán	1949	
28	Arena Fonte Nova	47,915	Brazil	Salvador	Bahia	1951	
29	Estadio Metropolitano de Fútbol de Lara	47,913	Venezuela	Cabudare	Deportivo Lara	2009	
30	Neo Química Arena	47,252	Brazil	São Paulo	Corinthians	2014	
31	Estadio Gigante de Arroyito	46,955	Argentina	Rosario	Rosario Central	1926	
32	Estadio Nacional Julio Martínez Prádanos	46,190	Chile	Santiago	Universidad de Chile, Chile national football team	1938	
33	Arena MRV	46,000	Brazil	Belo Horizonte	Clube Atlético Mineiro	2023	
34	Estádio Paulo Constantino	45,954	Brazil	Presidente Prudente	Grêmio Prudente	1982	
35	Estádio Governador Carlos Wilson Campos	45,440	Brazil	Recife	Brazil national football team	2013	
36	Estadio Ciudad de Lanús – Néstor Díaz Pérez	45,319	Argentina	Lanús	Lanús	1929	
37	Estadio Atanasio Girardot	44,826	Colombia	Medellín	Atlético Nacional	1953	
38	Estádio Olímpico Nilton Santos	44,661	Brazil	Rio de Janeiro	Botafogo	2007	
39	Estádio Universitário Pedro Pedrossian	44,200	Brazil	Campo Grande	Operário, Comercial	1971	
40	Estadio Nacional	43,661	Peru	Lima	Peru national football team	1927	
41	Estadio Monumental	43,595	Chile	Santiago	Colo-Colo, Chile national football team	1975	
42	Estadio General Pablo Rojas	43,050	Paraguay	Asunción	Cerro Porteño	1970	
43	Arena da Amazônia	42,924	Brazil	Manaus	Manaus, Nacional	2014	
44	Arena Pantanal	42,788	Brazil	Cuiabá	Cuiabá Esporte Clube, Mixto Esporte Clube	2014	
45	Arena da Baixada	42,372	Brazil	Curitiba	Athletico Paranaense	1999	
46	Estadio Metropolitano de Mérida	42,200	Venezuela	Mérida	Estudiantes de Merida	2007	
47	Nubank Parque	42,005	Brazil	São Paulo	Palmeiras	2014	
48	Estadio Rodrigo Paz Delgado	41,823	Ecuador	Quito	Ecuador national football team, LDU	1997	
49	Estadio Cachamay	41,600	Venezuela	Ciudad Guayana	Atlético Club Mineros de Guayana	1980	
50	Estadio Hernando Siles	41,199	Bolivia	La Paz	Bolivia, Club Bolivar, The Strongest	1930	
51	Estádio Couto Pereira	40,502	Brazil	Curitiba	Coritiba	1932	
52	Estadio Monumental de la UNSA	40,370	Peru	Arequipa	FBC Melgar	1993	
53	Estadio Campeón del Siglo	40,172	Uruguay	Montevideo	Peñarol	2016	
54	Estádio Governador João Castelo	40,149	Brazil	São Luís	Sampaio Corrêa	1982	
55	Estadio Banco del Pacífico Capwell	40,020	Ecuador	Guayaquil	CS Emelec	1945	
56	Estadio Monumental de Caracas Simón Bolívar	40,000	Venezuela	Caracas	Leones del Caracas	2023	
57	Estadio Nemesio Camacho El Campín	39,512	Colombia	Bogotá	Millonarios; Santa Fe	1938	
58	Estadio Olímpico Pascual Guerrero	38,588	Colombia	Cali	América; Atlético Fútbol Club; Boca Juniors de Cali	1937	
59	Estadio Polideportivo de Pueblo Nuevo	38,453	Venezuela	San Cristóbal	Deportivo Táchira Fútbol Club	1976	
60	Estadio Malvinas Argentinas	38,300	Argentina	Mendoza	Godoy Cruz	1978	
60	Estadio Ramón Tahuichi Aguilera	38,000	Bolivia	Santa Cruz de la Sierra	Oriente Petrolero, Club Blooming, Club Destroyers	1940	
62	Estadio José Antonio Anzoátegui	37,485	Venezuela	Puerto la Cruz	Deportivo Anzoátegui	1965	
63	Estadio Brigadier General Estanislao López	37,000	Argentina	Santa Fe	Colón	1946	
64	Estadio Eduardo Gallardón	36,542	Argentina	Lomas de Zamora	Los Andes	1940	
65	Estadio Defensores del Chaco	36,000	Paraguay	Asuncion	Paraguay national football team	1917	
66	Estadio Olímpico Atahualpa	35,499	Ecuador	Quito	América de Quito, SD Quito, El Nacional, Universidad Católica del Ecuador	1951	
67	Estadio José María Minella	35,354	Argentina	Mar del Plata	Aldosivi	1978	
68	Estadio Monumental José Fierro	35,200	Argentina	San Miguel de Tucumán	Atlético Tucumán	1922	
69	Estádio Manoel Barradas	35,000	Brazil	Salvador	Vitória	1986	
69	Centro Poliesportivo Pinheiro	35,000	Brazil	Curitiba		1985	
71	Estadio Florencio Sola	34,901	Argentina	Banfield	Banfield	1940	
72	Estadio Inca Garcilaso de la Vega	34,500	Peru	Cusco	Cienciano, Cusco FC, Deportivo Garcilaso	1958	
73	Estadio Jorge Luis Hirschi	34,381	Argentina	La Plata	Estudiantes de La Plata	1907	
74	Estadio Gran Parque Central	34,361	Uruguay	Montevideo	Nacional	1900	
75	Estadio Jesús Bermúdez	33,795	Bolivia	Oruro	Club San José	1955	
76	Estádio Adelmar da Costa Carvalho	32,983	Brazil	Recife	Sport Recife	1937	
77	Estádio Benedito Teixeira	32,936	Brazil	São José do Rio Preto	América FC (SP)	1996	
78	Estadio Nueva España	32,500	Argentina	Buenos Aires	Deportivo Español	1981	
79	Estadio José Pachencho Romero	32,470	Venezuela	Maracaibo	Unión Atlético Maracaibo	1971	
80	Estadio General Santander	32,163	Colombia	Cúcuta	Cúcuta Deportivo	1948	
81	Estádio de Pituaçu	32,157	Brazil	Salvador	Galícia	1979	
82	Estadio Felix Capriles	32,100	Bolivia	Cochabamba	Club Jorge Wilstermann, Club Aurora	1938	
83	Arena das Dunas	32,050	Brazil	Natal	América FC (RN)	2014	
84	Estadio Universidad San Marcos	32,000	Peru	Lima	Universidad San Marcos	1951	
85	Estadio Nuevo Francisco Urbano	32,000	Argentina	Morón	Morón	2013	
85	Estadio Municipal Centenario Manuel Rivera Sánchez	32,000	Peru	Chimbote	José Gálvez	2007	
87	Estadio Pedro Bidegain	31,814	Argentina	Buenos Aires	San Lorenzo	1993	
88	Estadio Palogrande	31,611	Colombia	Manizales	Once Caldas	1994	
89	Arena Barueri	31,452	Brazil	Barueri	Oeste	2007	
90	Estádio Jacy Scaff	31,000	Brazil	Londrina	Londrina	1976	
90	Estadio José Hernández	31,000	Argentina	Jesús María		1966	
92	Estadio Juan Carmelo Zerillo	30,973	Argentina	La Plata	Gimnasia y Esgrima (LP)	1924	
93	Estadio Olímpico Patria	30,700	Bolivia	Sucre	Club Universitario, Independiente Petrolero	1992	
94	Estadio Municipal de Concepción	30,448	Chile	Concepción	Deportes Concepción, Universidad de Concepción, Fernández Vial	1962	
95	Estadio Hernán Ramírez Villegas	30,239	Colombia	Pereira	Deportivo Pereira	1971	
96	Estadio Centenario Dr. José Luis Meiszner	30,200	Argentina	Quilmes	Quilmes	1995	
97	Estadio Alejandro Villanueva	30,000	Peru	Lima	Alianza Lima	1974	
97	Estadio Julio César Villagra	30,000	Argentina	Córdoba	Belgrano	1929	
97	Estadio Único Madre de Ciudades	30,000	Argentina	Santiago del Estero		2020	
97	Estadio Monumental de la UNA	30,000	Peru	Puno	Alfonso Ugarte	2022	
97	Estádio Mário Helênio	30,000	Brazil	Juiz de Fora	Tupi FC	1988	
97	Estadio La Ceiba	30,000	Venezuela	Ciudad Guayana		1998	
97	Estádio Universitário São Paulo	30,000	Brazil	São Paulo		1961	

== See also ==
- List of African stadiums by capacity
- List of Asian stadiums by capacity
- List of European stadiums by capacity
- List of North American stadiums by capacity
- List of Oceanian stadiums by capacity
- List of association football stadiums by country
- Lists of stadiums
- Sport in South America
