= Hamhung Stadium =

Sports venue in Hamhung, North Korea

- Interactive map of Hamhung Stadium
- Full name: Hamhung Stadium
- Location: Hamhung, North Korea
- Coordinates: 39°55′11″N 127°32′20″E
- Capacity: 35,000

Construction
- Opened: 1981
- Renovated: 2025

Hamhung Stadium (Korean: 함흥경기장) is a multi-purpose stadium in Hamhung, North Korea. It is currently used mostly for football matches. The stadium holds 35,000 spectators and opened in 1981.

North Korean state media announced in October 2025 that Hamhung Stadium had been renovated.

== See also ==
- List of football stadiums in North Korea
