= Rongcheng Stadium =

Sports venue in Rongcheng, Shandong, China

Coordinates: 37°08′44″N 122°28′20″E

- Interactive map of Rongcheng Stadium
- Full name: Rongcheng Stadium
- Location: Rongcheng, China
- Capacity: 30,000

Rongcheng Stadium is a multi-purpose stadium in Rongcheng, China. It is currently used mostly for football matches. The stadium holds 30,000 spectators.

== See also ==
- List of football stadiums in China
- List of stadiums in China
- Lists of stadiums
