= Kaesong Youth Stadium =

Sports venue in Kaesong, North Korea

Kaesŏng Youth Stadium
- Interactive map of Kaesŏng Youth Stadium
- Full name: Kaesŏng Youth Stadium
- Location: Kaesŏng, North Korea
- Coordinates: 37°58′51″N 126°33′40″E
- Capacity: 35,000

Construction
- Opened: 1988

The Kaesŏng Youth Stadium (Korean: 개성청년경기장; Hanja: 開城青年競技場) is a multi-use stadium in Kaesŏng, North Korea. It is currently used mostly for football matches. The stadium holds 35,000 spectators and opened in 1988.

== See also ==
- List of football stadiums in North Korea
