= Tengzhou Olympic Center Stadium =

Football stadium in Tengzhou, China

Tengzhou Olympic Centre Stadium
- Interactive map of Tengzhou Olympic Centre Stadium
- Location: Tengzhou, China
- Coordinates: 35.1150°N 117.1771°E
- Capacity: 30,000

Tenant
- Women's Football at the 2009 National Games of China

Tengzhou Olympic Centre Stadium is a football stadium in Tengzhou, China. It hosts football matches and hosted some matches for the Women's Football competition at the 2009 National Games of China. The stadium holds 30,000 spectators.
