= Huainan Sports Stadium =

Stadium in Huainan, China

- Interactive map of Huainan Sports Stadium
- Full name: Huainan Sports Stadium
- Location: Huainan, China
- Coordinates: 32°34′7″N 117°0′33″E
- Capacity: 20,103

Construction
- Opened: 2019

Huainan Sports Stadium is a multi-purpose stadium in Huainan, China. It is currently used mostly for football matches. The stadium holds 20,103 spectators. It opened in 2010.
