= List of North American stadiums by capacity =

The following is an incomplete list of sports stadiums in North America, including Central America and the Caribbean. They are ordered by their seating capacity, that is the maximum number of seated spectators the stadium can accommodate.

Currently all North American stadiums with a capacity of 30,000 or more are included.

Most large stadiums in North America are used for American football, with the rest used for association football, baseball, Canadian football, and one each for bullfighting and cricket.

== List ==
Rank	Stadium	Capacity	City	Country	Tenants	Images
1	Michigan Stadium	107,601	Ann Arbor	United States	Michigan Wolverines football	
2	Beaver Stadium	106,572	University Park	United States	Penn State Nittany Lions football	
3	Ohio Stadium	102,780	Columbus	United States	Ohio State Buckeyes football	
4	Kyle Field	102,512	College Station	United States	Texas A&M Aggies football	
5	Tiger Stadium	102,321	Baton Rouge	United States	LSU Tigers football	
6	Neyland Stadium	101,915	Knoxville	United States	Tennessee Volunteers football	
7	Darrell K Royal–Texas Memorial Stadium	100,119	Austin	United States	Texas Longhorns football	
8	Bryant–Denny Stadium	100,077	Tuscaloosa	United States	Alabama Crimson Tide football	
9	Sanford Stadium	92,756	Athens	United States	Georgia Bulldogs football	
10	Cotton Bowl	92,100	Dallas	United States	Hosts Red River Rivalry (Oklahoma vs. Texas), State Fair Classic (Grambling vs. Prairie View), Heart of Dallas Bowl, Atlético Dallas, Dallas Trinity FC	
11	Rose Bowl	89,702	Pasadena	United States	UCLA Bruins football, hosts Rose Bowl Game annually	
12	Ben Hill Griffin Stadium	88,548	Gainesville	United States	Florida Gators football	
13	Jordan–Hare Stadium	88,043	Auburn	United States	Auburn Tigers football	
14	Estadio Azteca	87,523	Mexico City	Mexico	Club América	
15	Memorial Stadium	85,458	Lincoln	United States	Nebraska Cornhuskers football	
16	MetLife Stadium	82,500	East Rutherford	United States	New York Giants, New York Jets	
17	Memorial Stadium	81,500	Clemson	United States	Clemson Tigers football	
18	Lambeau Field	81,441	Green Bay	United States	Green Bay Packers	
19	Gaylord Family Oklahoma Memorial Stadium	80,126	Norman	United States	Oklahoma Sooners football	
20	AT&T Stadium	80,000	Arlington	United States	Dallas Cowboys, hosts Cotton Bowl Classic	
21	Doak Campbell Stadium	79,560	Tallahassee	United States	Florida State Seminoles football	
22	Notre Dame Stadium	77,662	Notre Dame	United States	Notre Dame Fighting Irish football	
23	Williams-Brice Stadium	77,559	Columbia	United States	South Carolina Gamecocks football	
24	Los Angeles Memorial Coliseum	77,500	Los Angeles	United States	USC Trojans football	
25	Arrowhead Stadium	76,416	Kansas City	United States	Kansas City Chiefs	
26	Donald W. Reynolds Razorback Stadium	76,212	Fayetteville	United States	Arkansas Razorbacks football (primary)	
27	Empower Field	76,125	Denver	United States	Denver Broncos	
28	Camp Randall Stadium	75,822	Madison	United States	Wisconsin Badgers football	
29	Spartan Stadium	75,005	East Lansing	United States	Michigan State Spartans football	
30	Bank of America Stadium	74,867	Charlotte	United States	Carolina Panthers, Charlotte FC, hosts Duke's Mayo Bowl	
31	Caesars Superdome	73,208	New Orleans	United States	New Orleans Saints; hosts Bayou Classic (Grambling vs. Southern), New Orleans Bowl and Sugar Bowl annually	
32	NRG Stadium	72,220	Houston	United States	Houston Texans, hosts Meineke Car Care Bowl of Texas	
33	Highmark Stadium	71,608	Orchard Park	United States	Buffalo Bills	
34	Legion Field	71,594	Birmingham	United States	Magic City Classic	
35	M&T Bank Stadium	71,008	Baltimore	United States	Baltimore Ravens	
36	Mercedes-Benz Stadium	71,000	Atlanta	United States	Atlanta Falcons, Atlanta United FC, hosts SEC Championship Game, Chick-fil-A Bowl, and Atlanta Football Classic (Florida A&M vs. another HBCU, most often Tennessee State)	
37	SoFi Stadium	70,240	Inglewood	United States	Los Angeles Rams, Los Angeles Chargers, hosts LA Bowl	
38	Husky Stadium	70,083	Seattle	United States	Washington Huskies football	
39	Kinnick Stadium	69,250	Iowa City	United States	Iowa Hawkeyes football	
40	Raymond James Stadium	69,218	Tampa	United States	Tampa Bay Buccaneers, South Florida Bulls football, Tampa Bay Vipers, hosts Outback Bowl	
41	Nissan Stadium	69,143	Nashville	United States	Tennessee Titans, Tennessee State Tigers football, hosts Music City Bowl	
42	Lumen Field	68,740	Seattle	United States	Seattle Seahawks, Seattle Sounders FC	
43	Levi's Stadium	68,500	Santa Clara, California	United States	San Francisco 49ers, Foster Farms Bowl, Pac-12 Football Championship Game	
44	Acrisure Stadium	68,400	Pittsburgh	United States	Pittsburgh Steelers, Pittsburgh Panthers football	
45	EverBank Stadium	67,814	Jacksonville	United States	Jacksonville Jaguars, hosts Gator Bowl	
46	Lincoln Financial Field	67,594	Philadelphia	United States	Philadelphia Eagles, Temple Owls football	
47	Cleveland Browns Stadium	67,431	Cleveland	United States	Cleveland Browns	
48	The Dome at America's Center	67,277	St. Louis	United States	St. Louis BattleHawks	
49	US Bank Stadium	66,655	Minneapolis	United States	Minnesota Vikings	
50	Gillette Stadium	65,878	Foxborough	United States	New England Patriots, New England Revolution	
51	Lane Stadium	65,632	Blacksburg	United States	Virginia Tech Hokies football	
52	Paycor Stadium	65,515	Cincinnati	United States	Cincinnati Bengals	
53	Allegiant Stadium	65,000	Las Vegas	United States	Las Vegas Raiders, UNLV Rebels football, hosts Las Vegas Bowl	
54	Ford Field	65,000	Detroit	United States	Detroit Lions, hosts MAC Championship Game and Little Caesars Pizza Bowl	
55	Hard Rock Stadium	64,767	Miami Gardens	United States	Miami Dolphins; Miami Hurricanes football; hosts Orange Bowl annually	
56	Vaught–Hemingway Stadium	64,038	Oxford	United States	Ole Miss Rebels football	
57	Alamodome	64,000	San Antonio	United States	UTSA Roadrunners football; hosts Alamo Bowl, US Army All-American Bowl	
58	LaVell Edwards Stadium	63,470	Provo	United States	BYU Cougars football	
59	State Farm Stadium	63,400	Glendale	United States	Arizona Cardinals, hosts Fiesta Bowl annually	
60	California Memorial Stadium	63,186	Berkeley	United States	California Golden Bears football	
61	Estadio Olímpico Universitario	63,186	Mexico City	Mexico	Pumas UNAM, Pumas Dorados de la UNAM	
62	Lucas Oil Stadium	63,000	Indianapolis	United States	Indianapolis Colts, Indy Eleven, hosts Big Ten Championship Game, Monster Truck Races and Circle City Classic (annual HBCU event)	
63	Commanders Field	62,000	Landover	United States	Washington Commanders	
64	Faurot Field	61,620	Columbia	United States	Missouri Tigers football	
65	Jack Trice Stadium	61,500	Ames	United States	Iowa State Cyclones football	
66	Scott Stadium	61,500	Charlottesville	United States	Virginia Cavaliers football	
67	Soldier Field	61,500	Chicago	United States	Chicago Bears, Chicago Fire FC	
68	Yale Bowl Stadium	61,446	New Haven	United States	Yale Bulldogs football	
69	Ross–Ade Stadium	61,441	West Lafayette	United States	Purdue Boilermakers football	
70	Davis Wade Stadium	61,337	Starkville	United States	Mississippi State Bulldogs football	
71	Kroger Field	61,000	Lexington	United States	Kentucky Wildcats football	
72	L&N Federal Credit Union Stadium	60,800	Louisville	United States	Louisville Cardinals football	
73	Memorial Stadium	60,670	Champaign	United States	Illinois Fighting Illini football	
74	Mississippi Veterans Memorial Stadium	60,492	Jackson	United States	Jackson State Tigers football	
75	Galaxy Stadium	60,454	Lubbock	United States	Texas Tech Red Raiders football	
76	Camping World Stadium	60,219	Orlando	United States	Jones High School; also hosts Capital One Bowl, Champs Sports Bowl, and Florida Classic (Florida A&M v Bethune-Cookman)	
77	Mountaineer Field at Milan Puskar Stadium	60,000	Morgantown	United States	West Virginia Mountaineers football	
78	Arizona Stadium	57,803	Tucson	United States	Arizona Wildcats football	
79	Carter–Finley Stadium	57,583	Raleigh	United States	NC State Wolfpack football	
80	Estadio Jalisco	56,713	Guadalajara	Mexico	Club Atlas	
81	Commonwealth Stadium	56,302	Edmonton	Canada	Edmonton Elks	
82	Olympic Stadium	56,040	Montreal	Canada	CF Montréal (occasional use only)	
83	Dodger Stadium	56,000	Los Angeles	United States	Los Angeles Dodgers	
84	Boone Pickens Stadium	55,509	Stillwater	United States	Oklahoma State Cowboys football	
85	BC Place	55,000	Vancouver	Canada	BC Lions, Vancouver Whitecaps FC	
86	Bobby Dodd Stadium	55,000	Atlanta	United States	Georgia Tech Yellow Jackets football, temporary home to Atlanta United FC (2017)	
87	Estadio Latinoamericano	55,000	Havana	Cuba	Industriales, Metropolitanos	
88	Autzen Stadium	54,000	Eugene	United States	Oregon Ducks football	
89	Mountain America Stadium	53,599	Tempe	United States	Arizona State Sun Devils football	
90	Folsom Field	53,500	Boulder	United States	Colorado Buffaloes football	
91	Estadio BBVA	53,500	Monterrey	Mexico	CF Monterrey	
92	War Memorial Stadium	53,727	Little Rock	United States	Arkansas Razorbacks football (secondary to Razorback Stadium), Little Rock Rangers	
93	Independence Stadium	53,000	Shreveport	United States	none, hosts annual Independence Bowl game	
94	Memorial Stadium	52,929	Bloomington	United States	Indiana Hoosiers football	
95	Franklin Field	52,593	Philadelphia	United States	Penn Quakers football	
96	SHI Stadium	52,454	Piscataway	United States	Rutgers Scarlet Knights football	
97	SECU Stadium	51,602	College Park	United States	Maryland Terrapins football	
98	Sun Bowl	51,500	El Paso	United States	UTEP Miners football, hosts Sun Bowl	
99	Rice-Eccles Stadium	51,444	Salt Lake City	United States	Utah Utes football	
100	Huntington Bank Stadium	50,805	Minneapolis	United States	Minnesota Golden Gophers football, temporary home to Minnesota United FC (2017–2018)	
101	Estadio Cuauhtémoc	50,754	Puebla	Mexico	Puebla FC	
102	Kenan Memorial Stadium	50,500	Chapel Hill	United States	North Carolina Tar Heels football	
103	Coors Field	50,445	Denver	United States	Colorado Rockies	
104	University of Kansas Memorial Stadium	50,071	Lawrence	United States	Kansas Jayhawks football	
105	Liberty Bowl Memorial Stadium	50,000	Memphis	United States	Memphis Tigers football, hosts Liberty Bowl game	
106	Bill Snyder Family Football Stadium	50,000	Manhattan	United States	Kansas State Wildcats football	
107	Dowdy–Ficklen Stadium	50,000	Greenville	United States	East Carolina Pirates football	
108	Stanford Stadium	50,000	Stanford	United States	Stanford Cardinal football	
109	JMA Wireless Dome	49,262	Syracuse	United States	Syracuse Orange football, men's and women's basketball, men's and women's lacrosse	
110	Chase Field	49,033	Phoenix	United States	Arizona Diamondbacks	
111	Oriole Park	48,876	Baltimore	United States	Baltimore Orioles	
112	Choctaw Stadium	48,000	Arlington	United States	Dallas Jackals, Dallas Renegades, North Texas SC	
113	Oakland Coliseum	46,847	Oakland	United States	Oakland Roots SC	
114	T-Mobile Park	47,116	Seattle	United States	Seattle Mariners	
115	Protective Stadium	47,100	Birmingham	United States	Birmingham Legion FC, Birmingham Stallions, UAB Blazers	
116	Rice Stadium	47,000	Houston	United States	Rice Owls football	
117	Busch Stadium	46,861	St. Louis	United States	St. Louis Cardinals	
118	Falcon Stadium	46,692	Colorado Springs	United States	Air Force Falcons football	
119	Yankee Stadium	46,537	New York City	United States	New York Yankees, New York City FC, hosts Pinstripe Bowl	
120	Reser Stadium	45,674	Corvallis	United States	Oregon State Beavers football	
121	Estadio Omnilife	45,500	Guadalajara	Mexico	CD Guadalajara	
122	McLane Stadium	45,140	Waco	United States	Baylor Bears football	
123	Angel Stadium of Anaheim	45,050	Anaheim	United States	Los Angeles Angels of Anaheim	
124	Amon G. Carter Stadium	45,000	Fort Worth	United States	TCU Horned Frogs football, host of the Armed Forces Bowl	
125	Estadio Cuscatlán	44,836	San Salvador	El Salvador	El Salvador national football team, Alianza FC	
126	Alumni Stadium	44,500	Chestnut Hill	United States	Boston College Eagles football	
127	FBC Mortgage Stadium	44,206	Orlando	United States	UCF Knights football	
128	Citizens Bank Park	43,647	Philadelphia	United States	Philadelphia Phillies	
129	Tropicana Field	42,735	St. Petersburg	United States	Tampa Bay Rays, hosts Beef 'O' Brady's Bowl	
130	Petco Park	42,445	San Diego	United States	San Diego Padres	
131	Great American Ball Park	42,059	Cincinnati	United States	Cincinnati Reds	
132	American Family Field	41,900	Milwaukee	United States	Milwaukee Brewers	
133	Nationals Park	41,888	Washington	United States	Washington Nationals	
134	Citi Field	41,800	New York City	United States	New York Mets	
135	Comerica Park	41,782	Detroit	United States	Detroit Tigers	
136	Oracle Park	41,503	San Francisco	United States	San Francisco Giants	
137	Rogers Centre	39,150	Toronto	Canada	Toronto Blue Jays	
138	Canvas Stadium	41,200	Fort Collins	United States	Colorado State Rams football	
139	Wrigley Field	41,160	Chicago	United States	Chicago Cubs	
140	Truist Park	41,149	Cumberland	United States	Atlanta Braves	
141	Estadio Morelos	41,056	Morelia	Mexico	Morelia	
142	Valley Children's Stadium	41,031	Fresno	United States	Fresno State Bulldogs football	
143	Daikin Park	40,950	Houston	United States	Houston Astros	
144	Ladd–Peebles Stadium	40,646	Mobile	United States	South Alabama Jaguars football, hosts Senior Bowl and GoDaddy.com Bowl	
145	Guaranteed Rate Field	40,615	Chicago	United States	Chicago White Sox	
146	Globe Life Field	40,300	Arlington	United States	Texas Rangers	
147	Pratt & Whitney Stadium	40,000	East Hartford	United States	UConn Huskies football	
148	Estadio Olímpico Metropolitano	40,000	San Pedro Sula	Honduras	Marathón	
149	Plaza México	40,000	Mexico City	Mexico	Bullfighting	
150	Michie Stadium	40,000	West Point	United States	Army Black Knights football	
151	TDECU Stadium	40,000	Houston	United States	Houston Cougars football, Houston Roughnecks	
152	Estadio Universitario	39,997	San Nicolás de los Garza	Mexico	Tigres de la UANL	
153	Vanderbilt Stadium	39,790	Nashville	United States	Vanderbilt Commodores football	
154	Target Field	39,504	Minneapolis	United States	Minnesota Twins	
155	Dreamstyle Stadium	39,224	Albuquerque	United States	New Mexico Lobos football, hosts New Mexico Bowl	
156	Kauffman Stadium	39,000	Kansas City	United States	Kansas City Royals	
157	PNC Park	38,496	Pittsburgh	United States	Pittsburgh Pirates	
158	Nippert Stadium	38,088	Cincinnati	United States	Cincinnati Bearcats football, FC Cincinnati	
159	Joan C. Edwards Stadium	38,016	Huntington	United States	Marshall Thundering Herd football	
160	Albertsons Stadium	37,500	Boise	United States	Boise State Broncos football, hosts Famous Idaho Potato Bowl	
161	Fenway Park	37,402	Boston	United States	Boston Red Sox	
162	LoanDepot Park	37,000	Miami	United States	Miami Marlins	
163	Sam Boyd Stadium	36,800	Las Vegas	United States	none	
164	MM Roberts Stadium	36,000	Hattiesburg	United States	Southern Miss Golden Eagles football	
165	McMahon Stadium	35,650	Calgary	Canada	Calgary Stampeders, Calgary Dinos, Calgary Wild FC	
166	Martin Stadium	35,117	Pullman	United States	Washington State Cougars football	
167	Estadio Nacional de Costa Rica	35,093	San José	Costa Rica	Costa Rica national football team	
168	Wallace Wade Stadium	35,018	Durham	United States	Duke Blue Devils football	
169	Estadio Azul	35,000	Mexico City	Mexico	Cruz Azul	
170	Snapdragon Stadium	35,000	San Diego	United States	San Diego State Aztecs football, San Diego FC, San Diego Wave FC	
171	Estadio Nacional Chelato Uclés	35,000	Tegucigalpa	Honduras	Club Deportivo Motagua, Club Deportivo Olimpia	
172	Independence Park	35,000	Kingston	Jamaica	Jamaica national football team	
173	Progressive Field	34,830	Cleveland	United States	Cleveland Guardians	
174	Estadio La Corregidora	34,130	Querétaro	Mexico	Querétaro FC	
175	Estadio Panamericano	34,000	Havana	Cuba		
176	Navy–Marine Corps Memorial Stadium	34,000	Annapolis	United States	Navy Midshipmen football, Chesapeake Bayhawks, Annapolis Blues FC, Military Bowl game	
177	Princess Auto Stadium	33,422	Winnipeg	Canada	Winnipeg Blue Bombers	
178	Mosaic Stadium	33,000	Regina	Canada	Saskatchewan Roughriders, Regina Rams, Regina Thunder, Regina Riot, local high schools	
179	War Memorial Stadium	32,580	Laramie	United States	Wyoming Cowboys football	
180	Gerald J. Ford Stadium	32,000	University Park	United States	SMU Mustangs football	
181	BB&T Field	31,500	Winston-Salem	United States	Wake Forest Demon Deacons football	
182	Estadio Nou Camp	31,297	León	Mexico	Club León	
183	Cajun Field	31,000	Lafayette	United States	Louisiana-Lafayette Ragin' Cajuns football	
184	Huskie Stadium	30,998	DeKalb	United States	Northern Illinois Huskies football	
185	Centennial Bank Stadium	30,964	Jonesboro	United States	Arkansas State Red Wolves football	
186	DATCU Stadium	30,850	Denton	United States	North Texas Mean Green football	
187	Joe Aillet Stadium	30,600	Ruston	United States	Louisiana Tech Bulldogs football	
188	Malone Stadium	30,427	Monroe	United States	ULM Warhawks football	
189	Aggie Memorial Stadium	30,343	Las Cruces	United States	New Mexico State Aggies football	
190	Harvard Stadium	30,323	Boston	United States	Harvard Crimson football	
191	Rynearson Stadium	30,200	Ypsilanti	United States	Eastern Michigan Eagles football	
192	Kelly/Shorts Stadium	30,199	Mount Pleasant	United States	Central Michigan Chippewas football	
193	Waldo Stadium	30,100	Kalamazoo	United States	Western Michigan Broncos football	
194	HA Chapman Stadium	30,000	Tulsa	United States	Tulsa Golden Hurricane football	
195	FAU Stadium	30,000	Boca Raton	United States	Florida Atlantic Owls football	
196	InfoCision Stadium – Summa Field	30,000	Akron	United States	Akron Zips football	
197	Bobcat Stadium	30,000	San Marcos	United States	Texas State Bobcats football	
198	Kidd Brewer Stadium	30,000	Boone	United States	Appalachian State Mountaineers football	
199	Veterans Memorial Stadium	30,000	Troy	United States	Troy Trojans football	
200	William "Dick" Price Stadium	30,000	Norfolk	United States	Norfolk State Spartans	
201	GEODIS Park	30,000	Nashville	United States	Nashville SC	

== See also ==
- List of African stadiums by capacity
- List of Asian stadiums by capacity
- List of European stadiums by capacity
- List of Oceanian stadiums by capacity
- List of South American stadiums by capacity
- List of association football stadiums by country
- Lists of stadiums
- Sports in North America
