= Jinzhou Binhai Sports Centre Stadium =

Sports venue in Jinzhou, Liaoning, China

Coordinates: 40.8722°N 121.0644°E

- 锦州滨海体育中心体育场
- Interactive map of Jinzhou Binhai Sports Centre Stadium
- Location: Jinzhou Economic-Technological Development Zone, Jinzhou, Liaoning, China
- Owner: Jinzhou Municipal Government
- Operator: Jinzhou Sports Bureau
- Capacity: 43,000
- Surface: Natural grass (football field)

Construction
- Groundbreaking: 2010
- Opened: 2017
- Cost: CN¥7 billion
- Architect: Harbin Institute of Technology Architectural Design and Research Institute

Tenant
- China National Youth Games (2017, 2018)

The Jinzhou Binhai Sports Centre Stadium is a multi-purpose stadium in the Jinzhou Economic-Technological Development Zone, Jinzhou, Liaoning, China. Opened in 2017, it was built to host large-scale sports events and serves as a key venue for regional athletics and football competitions.

== Design and architecture ==
The stadium’s design draws inspiration from Jinzhou’s coastal identity:

- Steel Grid Roof: A **273-meter-span steel grid roof** supported by diamond-shaped lattice arches, designed for seismic resilience.
- Wave-Like Lighting: Blue and white LED systems mimic ocean waves for nighttime events.
- Eco-Friendly Systems: Rainwater harvesting and solar panels integrated into the roof.

== Major events ==
- 2017–2018: Hosted athletics championships for the China National Youth Games.

== Recent developments ==
- 2022 Upgrades: Installed energy-efficient LED lighting and improved accessibility.
- Public Access: Part of Jinzhou’s coastal sports tourism initiative, offering free fitness zones.
