= Wusa Road Stadium =

Sports venue in Suzhou, Jiangsu, China

Coordinates: 31.306009°N 120.621685°E

Wusa Road Stadium (Chinese: 五卅路体育场), formerly known as the Suzhou City Stadium (Chinese: 苏州市体育场), is a multi-use stadium in Suzhou, China. Built in 1918, it is one of the oldest stadiums in Suzhou. It is currently used mostly for football matches.
