= Wuhu Olympic Stadium =

Sports venue in Wuhu, China

Coordinates: 31°18′40″N 118°22′33″E

Wuhu Olympic Stadium (Chinese: 芜湖奥林匹克体育场; pinyin: Wúhú Àolínpǐkè Tǐyùchǎng) is a multi-use stadium in Wuhu, Anhui, China. The stadium was constructed to host the 2002 Anhui Provincial Games. The center covers an area of 30.8 hectares, with a total building area of 113,627 square meters. It consists of a stadium with a capacity of 40,000, a gymnasium with a capacity of 5,500, a 6,400-square meter shooting range, external green spaces, as well as supporting facilities and functional rooms.

== History ==
In 2001, the city of Wuhu launched the Olympic Park project to develop a large-scale comprehensive sports center in the city in time for the 2002 Anhui Provincial Games. The project began development in December 2001 and was completed in September 2002, a timeline of just 10 months, setting a new record for speed of sports venue completion. The project was funded through a government investment of 670 million yuan.

From October 12 to 19, 2002, the 10th Annual Anhui Provincial Games were held in Wuhu. After the event, the city was faced with the difficulty of continuing to fund the annual maintenance costs, which exceeded one million yuan a year.

Between 2003 and 2008, the Wuhu Olympic Sports Center was managed by a third-party company. In this period, the sporting facilities were neglected in favor of the commercial aspects of the space, leading to operational decline.

Since 2019, there has been reinvestment in the athletic facilities of the stadium complex. In 2019, comprehensive upgrades were made to the track and field in order to host that year's National U20 Track and Field Championships. In 2022, the stadium underwent its first of multiple major renovations. The renovation included rust removal and repainting of the main stadium's steel structure, replacement of all 42 membrane structures, and the addition of a heating and drainage system. In 2023, Wuhu Shanhai Construction Co., Ltd. won the bid for the renovation and remediation of the sport complex's rainwater and sewage systems.

In 2026, it was announced that the sports complex would be entering into comprehensive upgrade cycle with a focus on upgrading the facilities needed to host professional events. The venue facilities, such as the artificial track and grandstand seating, will be renovated and replaced in order to meet World Athletics certification standards. Entertainment systems will also be upgraded, with investment into lighting, sound, large display screens and an improved HVAC system.

== Operations ==
The Wuhu Olympic Stadium complex hosts over 20 events of various levels and types every year, including mass fitness activities, sports competitions, and cultural performances. The facilities are also open daily for various recreational uses.

In 2013 and 2014, the venue hosted the China Sports Culture & Sports Tourism Expo. In 2018, it planned and organized the 5th China Automobile (RV) Camping Conference.

The stadium complex has hosted games for the Chinese Football League 1 and the National Men's Basketball League (NBL).

=== Sports Events ===
- National Fencing Championships
- National Wushu Sanda Championships
- National Archery Championships
- National U20 Track and Field Championships
- Wuhu Municipal Games
- Chery All-Star Football Invitational Tournament

=== Concerts ===
- 2023 Wuhu Shenshan Music Festival
- Wuhu Classic Sounds 1.0 All-Star Concert
- Happy Wuhu Dragon Rhyme River City Superstar Concert
