= Yantai Sports Park Stadium =

Sports venue in Yantai, China

- 烟台体育公园
- Location: 288 Guanhai Rd, Laishan, Yantai, Shandong, China
- Coordinates: 37°27′47″N 121°27′13″E

The Yantai Sports Park Stadium is a multi-use stadium in Yantai, China. It is currently used mostly for association football matches, and also for athletics and rugby sevens. The stadium has a capacity of 40,000.
