= List of football stadiums in North Korea =

This is a list of football stadiums in North Korea. The minimum capacity is 5,000. The two largest non-football stadiums in North Korea are the 20,100-capacity Pyongyang Indoor Stadium and the 12,309-capacity Ryugyong Chung Ju-yung Gymnasium.

== Current stadiums ==
| # | Image | Stadium | Capacity | City | Home team | Notes |
|---|---|---|---|---|---|---|
| 1 | | Rungrado 1st of May Stadium | 114,000 | P'yŏngyang | April 25 (for international club matches); National team (very rarely used) | Second largest stadium in the world. |
| 2 | | Kim Il-sung Stadium | 40,000 | P'yŏngyang | P'yŏngyang City, National team | Largest league use stadium in North Korea. |
| 3 | | Sunan Stadium | 40,000 | P'yŏngsŏng | – | |
| 4 | | Hamhŭng Stadium | 35,000 | Hamhŭng | Hamnam, Hamhŭng Railway | |
| 5 | | Kaesŏng Stadium | 35,000 | Kaesŏng | Kaesŏng City | |
| 6 | | Sariwŏn Youth Stadium | 35,000 | Sariwŏn | Rimyŏngsu | |
| 7 | | Namp'o Stadium | 30,000 | Namp'o | P'yŏngnam | |
| 8 | | Yanggakdo Stadium | 30,000 | P'yŏngyang | April 25, Sobaeksu | |
| 9 | | East Pyongyang Stadium | 30,000 | P'yŏngyang | – | |
| 10 | | Sinp'ung Stadium | 30,000 | Wŏnsan | Kangwŏn | |
| 11 | | Kimchaek Municipal Stadium | 30,000 | Kimch'aek | Wŏlmido | |
| 12 | | Haeju Stadium | 25,000 | Haeju | Hwangnam | |
| 13 | | Sŏsan Stadium | 25,000 | P'yŏngyang | – | |
| 14 | | Kanggye Stadium | 20,000 | Kanggye | Chagang | |
| 15 | | Rajin Stadium | 20,000 | Rasŏn | Sŏnbong | |
| 16 | | Hyesan Stadium | 18,640 | Hyesan | Ryanggang | |
| 17 | | October Stadium | 17,500 | Sinŭiju | Kigwancha, Amrokkang | |
| 18 | | Ch'ŏngjin Stadium | 15,000 | Ch'ŏngjin | Ch'andongja | |
| 19 | | City Stadium | 10,000 | P'yŏngyang | Kyŏnggong'ŏp | |
| 20 | | Hwaebul Stadium | 5,000 | Poch'ŏn | Hwaebul | |

== See also ==
- Lists of stadiums
