= List of sports venues in South Korea =

This is a list of sports venues in South Korea.

== General stadia ==
These stadia are used for various sports.

- Bucheon Stadium
- Busan Asiad Stadium, in Busan
- Changwon Civic Stadium
- Cheonan Baekseok Stadium
- Chuncheon Civic Stadium, in Chuncheon, Gangwon-do
- Daegu Stadium
- Dongcheon Arena, in Ulsan
- Duryu Park Stadium
- Gangneung Stadium, in Gangneung, Gangwon-do
- Gimcheon Stadium
- Gimhae Stadium, in Gimhae, Gyeongsangnam-do
- Goyang Stadium
- Gwang-Yang Stadium
- Gwangju City Public Stadium, in Gwangju, Gyeonggi-do
- Hanbat Stadium, in Daejeon
- Incheon Civic Stadium, in Incheon
- Jamsil Arena, in Seoul
- Jangchung Gymnasium, in Seoul
- Jecheon Stadium, in Jecheon, Chungcheongbuk-do
- Jeju Stadium, in Jeju City, Jeju-do
- Jeju World Cup Stadium
- Jeonju Stadium
- Masan Stadium, in Masan, Gyeongsangnam-do
- Munsu Cup Stadium
- Olympic Stadium, in Seoul
- Opo Public Stadium, in Gwangju, Gyeonggi-do
- Park Chung Hee Gymnasium
- Paju Public Stadium, in Paju
- Shilchon Public Stadium, in Gwangju, Gyeonggi-do
- Sajik Arena, in Busan
- Sangju Civic Stadium
- Seongnam 2 Stadium
- Seoul World Cup Stadium
- Steelyard Stadium
- Suwon Civic Stadium
- Suwon World Cup Stadium
- Toichon Public Stadium, in Gwangju, Gyeonggi-do
- Uijeongbu Stadium, in Uijeongbu, Gyeonggi-do

== Gymnastics venues ==
These are venues which are dedicated exclusively to gymnastics.

- Olympic Gymnastics Arena

== Tennis venues ==
These are venues which are dedicated exclusively to tennis.

- Seoul Olympic Park Tennis Center

== See also ==
- Sport in South Korea
- List of Asian stadiums by capacity
