= Korea American Football Association =

South Korean sporting organization

- Korea American Football Association's logo
- Formation: 1945
- Type: Non-profit
- Headquarters: Seoul
- Official language: Korean (KR)
- Chairman: Park Kyung-Kyu
- Website: KAFA.org

The Korea American Football Association (KAFA, Korean: 대한미식축구협회; Hanja: 大韓美式蹴球協會) has existed in South Korea for more than 70 years. The popularity of American football in South Korea has been historically low, but with the visit of Hines Ward (a South Korean-born NFL football star with the Pittsburgh Steelers) in 2006, the sport received a modest level of increased appeal. Within South Korea, KAFA is a sports governing body over both traditional football with pads and also flag football.

Traditional football leagues within South Korea is divided between university and senior (KNFL) teams. Three championship bowl games of special note occur at the end of the season. The Tiger Bowl determines the champions of the University league, the Gwanggaeto Bowl determines the champions of the KNFL, and finally, the Kimchi Bowl, the South Korean equivalent of Japan's Rice Bowl, pits the University champion against the KNFL champion.

== College programs ==
Institution	한국어	Location	Founded	Type	Enrollment	Nickname	Colors
Dong-eui University	동의대학교	Busan	1977	Private	22,992	Turtle Fighters	Red and White
Yonsei University	연세대학교	Seoul	1977	Private	38,725	Eagles	Royal Blue
Dankook University	단국대학교	Yongin	2015	Private	31,347	Kodiak	Navy and White

== Korea National Football League ==
In 2015, there were seven teams in the KNFL, divided into two divisions (북부리그 North Division, 남부리그 South Division). The top two seeds of each division played in a four-team semifinal playoff. Winners of the semifinals played in the Gwanggaeto Bowl Championship. The KNFL Champion played the Korean University League Champion in the Kimchi Bowl.

Starting in 2016, the KNFL changed to a full league format, with each of the seven teams playing one another. The two teams with the best regular season records face off in the Gwanggaeto Bowl. The KNFL Champion plays the Korean University League Champion in the Kimchi Bowl.

- Seoul Golden Eagles
- Seoul Carnivores (Sponsored by Seoul National University OB)
- Seoul Vikings
- Daegu Phoenix
- Samsung Geoje Blue Storm
- Busan Gryphons
- KS Bluegons (Sponsored by KyungSung University OB)

=== Gwanggaeto Bowl Finals ===
#	Date	Champions	Score	Runners-up	Venue
1	1996.1.7	Seven Six	20 - 6	Leos	Hyochang Stadium, Seoul
2	1997.1.19	Bluegons	18 - 6	Blue Friends	Sajik Stadium, Busan
3	1998.1.11	Seven Six	6 - 0	Bluegons	Kyungsung University Stadium, Busan
4	1999.1.10	Blue Friends	12 - 6	Caps	Hyochang Stadium, Seoul
5	2000.1.9	Red Stars	32 - 22	Caps	Hyochang Stadium, Seoul
6	2001.1.14	Red Stars	20 - 6	Scholars	Hyochang Stadium, Seoul
7	2002.1.13	Seven Six	18 - 12	Red Stars	Duryu Park Stadium, Daegu
8	2003.1.12	Scholars	18 - 12	Caps	Pusan National University Stadium, Busan
9	2004.1.18	Caps (Seoul Golden Eagles)	17 - 6	Bluegons	Pusan National University Stadium, Busan
10	2005.1.16	Halraes	14 - 7	Seven Six	Hyochang Stadium, Seoul
11	2005.12.18	Seoul Vikings	33 - 21	Caps	Yong In University Stadium, Yongin
12	2006.12.10	Gryphons	19 - 10	Seoul Vikings	Seoul National University Stadium, Seoul
13	2007.12.2	Gryphons	23 - 13	ADT Caps	Yong In University Stadium, Yongin
14	2008.12.7	Seoul Vikings	28 - 3	Seoul Golden Eagles	Namyangju Stadium, Namyangju
15	2009.12.6	ADT Caps	13 - 0	Seoul Vikings	Namyangju Stadium, Namyangju
16	2010.12.12	Daegu Phoenix	14 - 7	ADT Caps	Namyangju Stadium, Namyangju
17	2011.12.4	Seoul Warriors	16 - 13	Domino	Yongsan SIMS Stadium, Seoul
18	2012.12.2	Seoul Vikings	14 - 7	Seoul Warriors	Yongsan SIMS Stadium, Seoul
19	2013.11.24	Seoul Vikings	26 - 23	Seoul Golden Eagles	Yongsan SIMS Stadium, Seoul
20	2014.11.16	Samsung BlueStorm	28 - 13	Daegu Phoenix	Jinyeong Stadium, Gimhae
21	2015.11.15	Seoul Golden Eagles	22 - 14	Daegu Phoenix	Daegu Haany University Stadium, Gyeongsan
22	2016.11.20	Daegu Phoenix	34 - 20	Samsung Bluestorm	Seochang Stadium, Yangsan
23	2017.11.26	Seoul Vikings	13 - 12	Samsung Bluestorm	Seochang Stadium, Yangsan
24	2018.11.18	Seoul Vikings	14–0		
25	2019.11.23	Samsung Bluestorm	21–12	Daegu Phoenix	Kyungpook National University Stadium, Daegu
26	2024.12.8	Samsung Bluestorm	24–21	Incheon Rhinos	
27	2025.12.14	Samsung Bluestorm	37–21	Gunwi Phoenix	

== Tiger Bowl ==
The Tiger Bowl is an annual college football bowl game played in South Korea established in 1994. The game is the championship game for the KFAF's college programs.

=== Finals ===
#	Date	Champions	Score	Runners-up	Venue
1	1995	Dong-a University			
2	1996	Keimyung University			
3	1997	Kyungpook National University			
4	1998	Dong-a University			
5	1999	Dong-a University			
6	2000	Kyungsung University			
7	2001	Kyungsung University			
8	2002	Kumoh National Institute of Technology			
9	2003	Dong-a University			
10	2004	Kumoh National Institute of Technology			
11	2005	Dong-a University			
12	2006	Dong-Eui University			
13	2007	Dong-Eui University			
14	2008	Dong-Eui University			
15	2009	Pusan National University			
16	2010	Pusan National University			
17	2011	Pusan National University			
18	2012	Hanyang University			
19	2013	Pusan National University			
20	2014	Dong-Eui University			
21	2015	Dong-Eui University			
22	2016	Dong-Eui University			
23	2017	Dong-Eui University			
24	2018	Dong-Eui University			
25	2019	Sungkyunkwan University			

== Kimchi Bowl ==
The Kimchi Bowl is the final championship game of KAFA. The game pits the KNFL team that has won the Gwanggaeto Bowl against the university team that has won the Tiger bowl.

=== Finials ===
#	Date	Champions	Score	Runners-up	Venue
1	1996.1.14	DongA University	12 - 7	Seven Six	Sajik Stadium, Busan
2	1997.1.26	Bluegons	28 - 18	Keimyung University	Sajik Stadium, Busan
3	1998.1.18	Kyungpook National University	47 - 6	Seven Six	Hyochang Stadium, Seoul
4	1999.1.17	DongA University	35 - 22	Blue Friends	Hyochang Stadium, Seoul
5	2000.1.16	DongA University	19 - 14	Red Stars	Hyochang Stadium, Seoul
6	2001.1.21	Red Stars	13 - 0	Kyungsung University	Hyochang Stadium, Seoul
7	2002.1.27	Seven Six	27 - 14	Kyungsung University	Duryu Park Stadium, Daegu
8	2003.1.19	Gumoh National University	7 - 6	Scholars	Pusan National University Stadium, Busan
9	2004.1.1	Caps (Seoul Golden Eagles)	23 - 17	DongA University	Pusan National University Stadium, Busan
10	2005.1.30	Halraes	27 - 12	Gumoh National University	Hyochang Stadium, Seoul
11	2006.1.8	DongA University	7 - 6	Seoul Vikings	Keimyung University Stadium, Daegu
12	2007.1.14	Busan Gryphons	37 - 0	DongEui University	Pusan National University Stadium, Busan
13	2008.1.6	Busan Gryphons	21 - 12	DongEui University	Pusan National University Stadium, Busan
14	2009.1.11	Seoul Vikings	20 - 14	DongEui University	Namyangju Stadium, Namyangju
15	2010.1.10	Pusan National University	34 - 13	ADT Caps	Namyangju Stadium, Namyangju
16	2011.1.9	Daegu Phoenix	40 - 24	Busan National University	Kyungpook National University Stadium, Daegu
17	2012.1.8	Seoul Warriors	14 - 0	Busan National University	Seoul Yongsan SIMS Stadium, Seoul
18	2012.12.30	Seoul Vikings	23 - 0	Hanyang University	Pocheon Stadium, Pocheon
19	2013.12.1	Pusan National University	14 - 6	Seoul Vikings	Kyungil University Stadium, Gyeongsan
20	2014.11.30	Samsung BlueStorm	7 - 6	DongEui University	Samsung Heavy Industries Stadium, Geoje
21	2015.12.6	Seoul Golden Eagles	27 - 6	DongEui University	Seoul National University Stadium, Seoul
22	2016.12.4	DongEui University (Turtle Fighters)	17 - 6	Daegu Phoenix	Kyungpook National University Stadium, Daegu
23	2017.12.5	DongEui University (Turtle Fighters)	21 - 14	Seoul Vikings	Pusan National University Stadium, Busan

== See also ==
- South Korea national American football team
- International Federation of American Football (IFAF)
- IFAF Asia
