= Local highways of South Korea =

Highway classification in South Korea

In South Korea, highways that are managed by the provincial governments are called Local highways (Korean: 지방도; Hanja: 地方道; RR: Jibangdo). Usually route numbers have 2~4 digits; the first digit stands for the main province of its manager.

== Route Numbers ==
- State-funded local highways: 2 digits
- Gyeonggi Province: 300s
- Gangwon Province: 400s
- North Chungcheong Province: 500s
- South Chungcheong Province: 600s
- North Jeolla Province: 700s
- South Jeolla Province: 800s
- North Gyeongsang Province: 900s
- South Gyeongsang Province: 1000s
- Jeju Special Self-governing Province: 1100s

== State-funded local highways ==
There are some 2-digits local highways, called State-funded local highways (Korean: 국지도; Hanja: 國支道; RR: Gukjido; short term of Korean: 국가지원지방도; Hanja: 國家支援地方道; RR: Gukga Jiwon Jibangdo). These highways are basically managed by province level, but its routes are designated and controlled by the South Korean government. Also, most of 2-digits Local highways stand for planned extension route of the same-number national highways or candidates for upgrading to national routes.

Sign	Route number	Route name	Korean name	Origin	Terminus	Creation date	Length	Notes
pr 13	13	Sinji–Wando line	신지 ~ 완도선	Sinji-myeon, Wando-gun, Jeonnam	Wando-eup, Wando-gun, Jeonnam	19 July 1996	8.4 km	
pr 14	14	Gyeongsan ~ Yeongcheon line	경산 ~ 영천선	Jungbang-dong, Gyeongsan	Geumho-eup, Yeongcheon	11 July 2025	27.3 km	Former portion of Local Routes 909, 919 and 925
pr 15	15	Oenarodo–Yeonggwang line	외나로도 ~ 영광선	Bongrae-myeon, Goheung-gun, Jeonnam	Hongnong-eup, Yeonggwang-gun, Jeonnam (Hanbit nuclear power plant)	19 July 1996	261.6 km	
pr 17	17	Goheung–Goheung line	고흥 ~ 고흥선	Dohwa-myeon, Goheung-gun, Jeonnam	Podu-myeon, Goheung-gun, Jeonnam	11 July 2025	12.8 km	Former portion of Local Route 855
pr 19	19	Gyeongju–Gyeongju line	경주 ~ 경주선	Dohwa-myeon, Gyeongju	Gangdong-myeon, Gyeongju	11 July 2025	20.6 km	Former portion of Local Route 945
pr 20	20	Pohang–Yeongdeok line	포항 ~ 영덕선	Nam-gu, Pohang	Chuksan-myeon, Yeongdeok-gun, Gyeongbuk	25 August 2001	67.6 km	
pr 22	22	Yeosu–Suncheon line	여수 ~ 순천선	Hwayang-myeon, Yeosu	Jangcheon-dong, Suncheon	19 July 1996	43.4 km	
pr 23	23	Cheonan–Seoul line	천안 ~ 서울선	Dongnam-gu, Cheonan	Mapo-gu, Seoul (Gayang Bridge)	19 July 1996	105 km	
pr 28	28	Yeongju–Donghae line	영주 ~ 동해선	Bonghyeon-myeon, Yeongju	Danbong-dong, Donghae	17 November 2008	135.4 km	Route extended on 28 January 2012
pr 30	30	Sacheon–Daegu line	사천 ~ 대구선	Sacheon-eup, Sacheon	Seo-gu, Daegu	19 July 1996	142.4 km	
pr 32	32	Daejeon–Mungyeong line	대전 ~ 문경선	Yuseong-gu, Daejeon	Mojeon-dong, Mungyeong	19 July 1996	116.8 km	
pr 37	37	Namwon–Geochang line	남원 ~ 거창선	Inwol-myeon, Namwon	Mari-myeon, Geochang-gun, Gyeongnam	25 August 2001	75.4 km	
pr 39	39	Yangju–Dongducheon line	양주 ~ 동두천선	Jangheung-myeon, Yangju	Dongducheon, Gyeonggi	19 July 1996	29.6 km	
pr 49	49	Haenam–Wonju line	해남 ~ 원주선	Hwawon-myeon, Haenam-gun, Jeonnam	Wonju-si, Gangwon	19 July 1996	479 km	Rerouted on 13 July 2016
pr 55	55	Haenam–Geumsan line	해남 ~ 금산선	Bukpyeong-myeon, Haenam-gun, Jeonnam	Geumsan-eup, Geumsan-gun, Chungnam	25 August 2001	279.2 km	Rerouted on 13 July 2016
pr 56	56	Gimpo–Inje line	김포 ~ 인제선	Wolgot-myeon, Gimpo	Buk-myeon, Inje-gun, Gangwon	19 July 1996	230.6 km	
pr 57	57	Daejeon–Anyang line	대전 ~ 안양선	Seo-gu, Daejeon	Dongan-gu, Anyang	19 July 1996	147.4 km	
pr 58	58	Naju–Busan line	나주 ~ 부산선	Geumcheon-myeon, Naju, Jeonnam	Gangseo-gu, Busan	19 July 1996	251.1 km	
pr 60	60	Muan–Busan line	무안 ~ 부산선	Hyeongyeong-myeon, Muan-gun, Jeonnam	Jangan-eup, Gijang-gun, Busan	19 July 1996	316.5 km	
pr 67	67	Tongyeong–Chilgok line	통영 ~ 칠곡선	Tongyeong-si, Gyeongnam	Waegwan-eup, Chilgok-gun, Gyeongbuk	19 July 1996	253.4 km	Rerouted on 13 July 2016
pr 68	68	Seocheon–Gyeongju line	서천 ~ 경주선	Janghang-eup, Seocheon-gun, Chungnam	Gyeongju-si, Gyeongbuk	19 July 1996	386.7 km	
pr 69	69	Busan–Uljin line	부산 ~ 울진선	Gangseo-gu, Busan	Maehwa-myeon, Uljin-gun, Gyeongbuk	19 July 1996	250.7 km	
pr 70	70	Cheongyang–Chuncheon line	청양 ~ 춘천선	Daechi-myeon, Cheongyang-gun, Chungnam	Seo-myeon, Chuncheon	19 July 1996	331 km	Rerouted on 22 June 2021
pr 78	78	Gimpo–Pocheon line	김포 ~ 포천선	Wolgot-myeon, Gimpo	Idong-myeon, Pocheon	25 August 2001	163.7 km	Rerouted on 11 July 2017
pr 79	79	Changnyeong–Andong line	창녕 ~ 안동선	Yueo-myeon, Changnyeong-gun, Gyeongnam	Iljik-myeon, Andong	25 August 2001	183.8 km	Rerouted on 13 July 2016; Route extended on 22 June 2021
pr 82	82	Pyeongtaek–Pyeongchang line	평택 ~ 평창선	Poseung-eup, Pyeongtaek	Pyeongchang-eup, Pyeongchang-gun, Gangwon	19 July 1996	250.3 km	
pr 84	84	Ganghwa–Wonju line	강화 ~ 원주선	Ganghwa-eup, Ganghwa-gun, Incheon	Buron-myeon, Wonju	19 July 1996	143.8 km	
pr 86	86	Namyangju–Chuncheon line	남양주 ~ 춘천선	Jinjeop-eup, Namyangju	Dongsan-myeon, Chuncheon	19 July 1996	71.3 km	Abridged on 25 August 2001
pr 88	88	Hanam–Yeongyang line	하남 ~ 영양선	Baelami-dong, Hanam	Ilwol-myeon, Yeongyang-gun, Gyeongbuk	19 July 1996	269.5 km	
pr 90	90	Ulleungdo ring line	울릉도 순환선	Ulleung-eup, Ulleung-gun, Gyeongbuk	Ulleung-eup, Ulleung-gun, Gyeongbuk	17 November 2008	44.2 km	
pr 96	96	Taean–Cheongwon line	태안 ~ 청원선	Nam-myeon, Taean-gun, Chungnam	Ochang-eup, Cheongwon-gu, Cheongju	25 August 2001	207.1 km	Rerouted on 13 July 2016; Route extended on 22 June 2021
pr 97	97	Seogwipo–Jeju line	서귀포 ~ 제주선	Pyoseon-myeon, Seogwipo	Geonip-dong, Jeju City	19 July 1996	35.3 km	Former Local Route 1113
pr 98	98	Sudogwon ring line	수도권 순환선	Paldal-gu, Suwon	Paldal-gu, Suwon	25 August 2001	264.6 km	
pr 99	99	Seogwipo–Jeju line	서귀포 ~ 제주선	Namwon-eup, Seogwipo	Jocheon-eup, Jeju City	22 June 2021	29.8 km	Former Local Route 1118

=== Abolished State-funded local highway ===
Sign	Route number	Route name	Korean name	Origin	Terminus	Creation date	Abolition date	Notes
pr 19	~~19~~	Wonju–Hongcheon line	원주 ~ 홍천선	Wonju, Gangwon	Hongcheon-gun, Gangwon	19 July 1996	25 August 2001	Became part of National Route 19
pr 27	~~27~~	Goheung–Geumdo line	고흥 ~ 거금도선	Doyang-eup, Goheung-gun, Jeollanam-do	Geumsam-myeon, Goheung-gun, Jeollanam-do	19 July 1996	25 August 2001	Became part of National Route 27
pr 31	~~31~~	Dongnae–Gijang line	동래 ~ 기장선	Dongnae-gu, Busan	Gijang-gun, Busan	19 July 1996	17 November 2008	
pr 33	~~33~~	Gumi–Pyeongchang line	구미 ~ 평창선	Gumi	Pyeongchang-gun, Gangwon-do	19 July 1996	25 August 2001	Became part of National Route 59
pr 40	~~40~~	Taean–Cheongwon line	태안 ~ 청원선	Taean-gun, Chungcheongnam-do	Cheongwon-gun, Chungcheongbuk-do	19 July 1996	25 August 2001	Replaced by Local Route 96
pr 44	~~44~~	Yongin–Yangpyeong line	용인 ~ 양평선	Yongin	Yangpyeong-gun, Gyeonggi-do	19 July 1996	25 August 2001	Became part of Local Route 98
pr 59	~~59~~	Hadong–Seongju line	하동 ~ 성주선	Hadong-gun, Gyeongsangnam-do	Seongju-gun, Gyeongsangbuk-do	19 July 1996	25 August 2001	Became part of National Route 59
pr 95	~~95~~	Jeju–Seogwipo line	제주 ~ 서귀포선	Jeju City	Seogwipo	19 July 1996	25 August 2001	Upgraded to National Route 95 (now Local Route 1135)

== List of the routes ==
These are the list of the routes. For the state-funded local highway, See #State-funded local highways.

=== Gyeonggi Province (300s) ===
A lot of Local highways of Gyeonggi Province were changed in 1996 and 2005.

- ■(#CCDDCC) is origin or terminus that is not located in Gyeonggi Province.

Sign	Number	Name	Korean	Origin	Terminus	Length	Note
lr 301	Local Route 301	Ujeong–Jeongwang Line	우정 ~ 정왕선	Hwasan-ri, Ujeong-eup, Hwaseong	Jeongwang-dong, Siheung	63.908 km	
lr 302	Local Route 302	Ihwa–Geumgwang Line Deoksan–Osan Line	이화 ~ 금광선 덕산 ~ 오산선	Ihwa-ri, Ujeong-eup, Hwaseong	Singye-ri, Iwol-myeon, Jincheon County, North Chungcheong	86.811 km	
lr 305	Local Route 305	Seosin–Choji Line	서신 ~ 초지선	Sangan-ri, Seosin-myeon, Hwaseong	Seonggok-dong, Danwon-gu, Ansan	16.414 km	
lr 306	Local Route 306	Yanggam–Yulmyeon Line Iljuk–Eumseong Line	양감 ~ 율면선 일죽 ~ 음성선	Yodang-ri, Yanggam-myeon, Hwaseong	Eumnae-ri, Eumseong-eup, Eumseong County, North Chungcheong	95.29 km	
lr 309	Local Route 309	Poseung–Gwacheon Line	포승 ~ 과천선	Dogok-ri, Poseung-eup, Pyeongtaek	Juam-dong, Gwacheon	63.506 km	
lr 310	Local Route 310	Geumui–Bongmyeong Line	금의 ~ 봉명선	Hwasu-ri, Ujeong-eup, Hwaseong	Bongmyeong-ri, Namsa-myeon, Cheoin-gu, Yongin	36.497 km	
lr 311	Local Route 311	Galgot–Yeongdeok Line	갈곶 ~ 영덕선	Busan-dog, Osan	Yeongdeok-dong, Giheung-gu, Yongin	13.823 km	
lr 313	Local Route 313	Paengseong–Sasa Line	팽성 ~ 사사선	Songhwa-ri, Paengseong-eup, Pyeongtaek	Sasa-dong, Sangnok-gu, Ansan	65.839 km	
lr 314	Local Route 314	Jeongnam–Anseong Line	정남 ~ 안성선	Goji-ri, Jeongnam-myeon, Hwaseong	Jangseo-ri, Yangseong-myeon, Anseong	27.672 km	
lr 315	Local Route 315	Paengseong–Guseong Line	팽성 ~ 구성선	Gaeksa-ri, Paengseong-eup, Pyeongtaek	Sangha-dong, Giheung-gu, Yongin	52.331 km	
lr 317	Local Route 317	Pyeongtaek–Giheung Line	평택 ~ 기흥선	Segyo-dong, Pyeongtaek	Gongse-dong, Giheung-gu, Yongin	31.143 km	
lr 318	Local Route 318	Seosin–Janghowon Line	서신 ~ 장호원선	Songhwa-ri, Seosin-myeon, Hwaseong	Seoneup-ri, Janghowon-eup, Icheon	102.664 km	
lr 321	Local Route 321	Gongdo–Opo Line	공도 ~ 오포선	Manjeong-ri, Gongdo-eup, Anseong	Chuja-ri, Opo-eup, Gwangju	44.981 km	
lr 322	Local Route 322	Daebu–Annyeong Line	대부 ~ 안녕선	Daebudong-dong, Danwon-gu, Ansan	Annyeong-dong, Hwaseong	48.347 km	
lr 325	Local Route 325	Geumgwang–Toechon Line Jincheon–Anseong Line	금광 ~ 퇴촌선 진천 ~ 안성선	Seokhyeon-ri, Baekgok-myeon, Jincheon County, North Chungcheong	Gwangdong-ri, Toechon-myeon, Gwangju	93.026 km	
lr 329	Local Route 329	Iljuk–Daewol Line Mugeuk–Yongmun Line	일죽 ~ 대월선 무극 ~ 용문선	Naesong-ri, Geumwang-eup, Eumseong County, North Chungcheong	Daepo-dong, Icheon	38.819 km	
lr 330	Local Route 330	Gojan–Mokgam Line (3rd Gyeongin Expressway)	고잔 ~ 목감선	Jeongwang-dong, Siheung	Mokgam-dong, Siheung	13.2 km	Tolled
lr 333	Local Route 333	Yulmyeon–Gangha Line Cheongcheon–Yulmyeon Line	율면 ~ 강하선 청천 ~ 율면선	Deokpyeong-ri, Cheongcheon-myeon, Goesan County, North Chungcheong	Wangchang-ri, Gangha-myeon, Yangpyeong County	78.093 km	
lr 334	Local Route 334	Hagui–Geumgok Line	학의 ~ 금곡선	Hagui-dong, Uiwang	Geumgok-dong, Bundang-gu, Seongnam	10.6 km	
lr 337	Local Route 337	Janghowon–Mohyeon Line	장호원 ~ 모현선	Janghowon-ri, Janghowon-eup, Icheon	Maesan-ri, Mohyeon-myeon, Cheoin-gu, Yongin	61.8 km	Lengthened on 12 November 2007
lr 338	Local Route 338	Seongnam–Toechon Line	성남 ~ 퇴촌선	Hadaewon-dong, Jungwon-gu, Seongnam	Gwaneum-ri, Toechon-myeon, Gwangju	25.022 km	
lr 341	Local Route 341	Ganam–Danwol Line	가남 ~ 단월선	Samgun-ri, Ganam-eup, Yeoju	Hyangso-ri, Danwol-myeon, Yangpyeong County	49.113 km	
lr 342	Local Route 342	Seongnam–Yangdong Line	성남 ~ 양동선	Bokjeong-dong, Sujeong-gu, Seongnam	Geumwang-ri, Yangdong-myeon, Yangpyeong County	87.836 km	
lr 345	Local Route 345	Jeomdong–Danwol Line	점동 ~ 단월선	Cheo-ri, Jeomdong-myeon, Yeoju	Seoksan-ri, Danwol-myeon, Yangpyeong County	70.978 km	
lr 349	Local Route 349	Gangcheon–Cheongun Line Munmak–Danwol Line	강천 ~ 청운선 문막 ~ 단월선	Bangye-ri, Munmak-eup, Wonju, Gangwon Province	Garun-ri, Cheongun-myeon, Yangpyeong County	34.466 km	
lr 352	Local Route 352	Wabu–Okcheon Line	와부 ~ 옥천선	Yangsu-ri, Yangseo-myeon, Yangpyeong County	Sinbok-ri, Okcheon-myeon, Yangpyeong County	21.688 km	
lr 355	Local Route 355	Yangchon–Haseong Line	양촌 ~ 하성선	Daepo-ri, Yangchon-eup, Gimpo	Mageunpo-ri, Haseong-myeon, Gimpo	16.238 km	
lr 356	Local Route 356	Wolgot–Dongsan Line	월곶 ~ 동산선	Ponae-ri, Wolgot-myeon, Gimpo	Gusan-dong, Ilsanseo-gu, Goyang	55.788 km	
lr 357	Local Route 357	Deogyang–Gyoha Line	덕양 ~ 교하선	Deogeun-dong, Deogyang-gu, Goyang	Galhyeon-ri, Tanhyeon-myeon, Paju	32.1 km	
lr 358	Local Route 358	Gimpo–Gwansan Line	김포 ~ 관산선	Chowonji-ri, Daegot-myeon, Gimpo	Gwansan-dong, Deogyang-gu, Goyang	24.8 km	
lr 359	Local Route 359	Ilsan–Munsan Line	일산 ~ 문산선	Daehwa-dong, Ilsanseo-gu, Goyang	Seonyu-ri, Munsan-eup, Paju	27.613 km	
lr 360	Local Route 360	Tongildongsan–Gasan Line	통일동산 ~ 가산선	Seongdong-ri, Tanhyeon-myeon, Paju	Masan-ri, Gasan-myeon, Pocheon	58.282 km	
lr 363	Local Route 363	Hwajeon–Tanhyeon Line	화전 ~ 탄현선	Hyangdong-dong, Deogyang-gu, Goyang	Nakha-ri, Tanhyeon-myeon, Paju	58.282 km	
lr 364	Local Route 364	Munsan–Gapyeong Line	문산 ~ 가평선	Dangdong-ri, Munsan-eup, Paju	Seungan-ri, Gapyeong-eup, Gapyeong County	90.786 km	
lr 367	Local Route 367	Byeokje–Jangnam Line	벽제 ~ 장남선	Byeokje-dong, Deogyang-gu, Goyang	Panbu-ri, Jangnam-myeon, Yeoncheon County	44.804 km	
lr 368	Local Route 368	Cheongsan–Jeo kmok Line	청산 ~ 적목선	Choseong-ri, Cheongsan-myeon, Yeoncheon County	Jeo kmok-ri, Buk-myeon, Gapyeong County	44.897 km	
lr 371	Local Route 371	Ogeum–Jungmyeon Line	오금 ~ 중면선	Ogeum-dong, Deogyang-gu, Goyang	Jeokgeo-ri, Jung-myeon, Yeoncheon County	76.43 km	
lr 372	Local Route 372	Gunnae–Baegun Line Gwangdeok–Maengdae Line	군내 ~ 백운선 광덕 ~ 맹대선	Bangmok-ri, Gunnae-myeon, Paju	Gwangdeok-ri, Sanae-myeon, Hwacheon-gun, Gangwon Province	93.737 km	
lr 375	Local Route 375	Gwangjeok–Misan Line	광적 ~ 미산선	Ganap-ri, Gwangjeok-myeon, Yangju	Majeon-ri, Misan-myeon, Yeoncheon County	30.077 km	
lr 376	Local Route 376	Jungmyeon–Gwanin Line	중면 ~ 관인선	Jeokgeo-ri, Jung-myeon, Yeoncheon County	Sajeong-ri, Gwanin-myeon, Pocheon	26.0 km	
lr 379	Local Route 379	Junae–Sinbuk Line	주내 ~ 신북선	Samsung-dong, Yangju	Deokdun-ri, Sinbuk-myeon, Pocheon	25.772 km	
lr 383	Local Route 383	Jigeum–Jinjeop Line	지금 ~ 진접선	Jigeum-dong, Namyangju	Yeonpyeong-ri, Jinjeop-eup, Namyangju	18.3 km	Shortened in January 2009
lr 387	Local Route 387	Hwado–Gwanin Line Naechon–Cheolwon Line	화도 ~ 관인선 내촌 ~ 철원선	Changhyeon-ri, Hwado-eup, Namyangju	Jangheung-ri, Dongsong-eup, Cheorwon County, Gangwon Province	80.557 km	
lr 391	Local Route 391	Yangseo–Hwaak Line Gyeonggang–Sanae Line	양서 ~ 화악선 경강 ~ 사내선	Munho-ri, Seojong-myeon, Yangpyeong County	Sachang-ri, Sanae-myeon, Hwacheon County, Gangwon Province	84.268 km	

=== Gangwon Province (400s) ===
Sign	Number	Name	Korean	Origin	Terminus	Length	Note
lr 403	Local Route 403	Hongcheon–Yanggu Line	홍천 ~ 양구선	Mogok-ri, Seo-myeon, Hongcheon County	Sang-ri, Yanggu-eup, Yanggu County	98.465 km	
lr 404	Local Route 404	Gwimun-ro (Munmak–Ungye Line)	문막 ~ 운계선	Pojin-ri, Munmak-eup, Wonju	Ungye-ri, Gwirae-myeon, Wonju	14.157 km	
lr 406	Local Route 406	Gonggeun–Hwachon Line	공근 ~ 화촌선	Hakdam-ri, Gongeun-myeon, Hoengseong County	Guneop-ri, Hwachon-myeon, Hongcheon County	37.823 km	
lr 407	Local Route 407	Chunhwa-ro (Yongsan–Hwacheon Line)	용산 ~ 화천선	Yongsan-ri, Sinbuk-eup, Chuncheon County	Ha-ri, Hwachon-eup, Hwacheon County	21.400 km	
lr 408	Local Route 408	Sanggeol–Bongpyeong Line	상걸 ~ 봉평선	Jaeun-ri, Duchon-myeon, Hongcheon County	Baekokpo-ri, Yongpyeong-myeon, Hwacheon County	72.530 km	
lr 409	Local Route 409	Heungup - Seowon Line	상걸 ~ 봉평선	Manjong-ri, Hojeo-myeon, Wonju	Yuhyeon-ri, Seowon-myeon, Hoengseong County	25.308 km	
lr 410	Local Route 410	Hajinbu - Godan Line	하진부 ~ 고단선	Singi-ri, Jinbu-myeon, Pyeongchang County	Godan-ri, Wangsan-myeon, Gangneung	45.600 km	
lr 411	Local Route 411	Sillim - Dunnae Line	신림 ~ 둔내선	Hwangdun-ri, Sillim-myeon, Wonju	Hyeoncheon-ri, Dunnae-myeon, Hoengseong County	39.436 km	
lr 414	Local Route 414	Hambaeksan-ro (Gohan - Hwangji Line)	고한 ~ 황지선	Gohan-ri, Gohan-eup, Jeongseon County	Hyeol-dong, Taebaek	21.800 km	
lr 415	Local Route 415	Yeongwol - Gangneung Line	고한 ~ 황지선	Mungok-ri, Buk-myeon, Yeongwol County	Haengjeong-ri, Yeongok-myeon, Gangneung	111.790 km	Route integrated on 2017-01-06
lr 416	Local Route 416	Gagokcheon-ro (Sinri - Wolcheon Line)	신리 ~ 월천선	Sin-ri, Dogye-eup, Samcheok	Wolcheon-ri, Wondeok-eup, Samcheok	31.204 km	
lr 418	Local Route 418	Hyeonri - Hagwangjeong Line	현리 ~ 하광정선	Hyeon-ri, Kirin-myeon, Inje County	Hagwangjeong-ri, Hyeonbuk-myeon, Yangyang County	68.293 km	
lr 420	Local Route 420	Dongmyeon - Bangrim Line	동면 ~ 방림선	Jwaun-ri, Yeongguimi-myeon, Hongcheon County	Gyechon-ri, Bangrim-myeon, Pyeongchang County	53.640 km	
lr 421	Local Route 421	Noil - Imgye Line	노일 ~ 임계선	Yemi-ri, Sindong-eup, Jeongseon County	Tosan-ri, Hajang-myeon, Samcheok	49.618 km	
lr 424	Local Route 424	Naemyeon - Deoksan Line	내면 ~ 덕산선	Naeyeon Jaun-ri, Hongcheon County	Gyoga-ri, Geundeok-myeon, Samcheok	174.614 km	
lr 426	Local Route 426	Seohwa - Jukwang Line	서화 ~ 죽왕선	Seohwa-ri, Seohwa-myeon, Inje County	Sampo-ri, Jukwang-myeon, Goseong County	41.500 km	
lr 427	Local Route 427	Hwangji - Geundeok Line	황지 ~ 근덕선	Gusa-ri, Dogye-eup, Samcheok	Dongmak-ri, Guendok-myeon, Goseong County	37.800 km	
lr 442	Local Route 442	Hanu-ro (Hoengseong - Anheung Line)	횡성 ~ 안흥선	Chudong-ri, Hoengseong-eup, Hoengseong County	Woohang-ri, Ucheon-myeon, Hoengseong County	6.165 km	
lr 444	Local Route 444	Heongcheon - Sangnam Line	홍천 ~ 상남선	Galmagok-ri, Hongcheon-eup, Hongcheon County	Sangnam-ri, Sangnam-myeon, Inje County	46.461 km	
lr 446	Local Route 446	Shinnam - Jinbu Line	신남 ~ 진부선	Sinnam-ri, Nam-myeon, Inje County	Gwangwon-ri, Nae-myeon, Hongcheon County	57.374 km	
lr 451	Local Route 451	Cheoljeong - Hyeonri Line Ahobsalilo-ro	철정 ~ 현리선	Cheoljeong-ri, Duchon-myeon, Hongcheon County	Sangnam-ri, Sangnam-myeon, Inje County	32.448 km	
lr 453	Local Route 453	Wontong - Imdang Line	원통 ~ 임당선	Wongtong-ri, Buk-myeon, Inje County	Imdang-ri, Dong-myeon, Yanggu	41.500 km	
lr 456	Local Route 456	Jinbu - Gangneung Line Gyeonggang-ro	진부 ~ 강릉선	Ganpyeong-ri, Jinbu-myeon, Pyongcheong County	Gusan-ri, Seongsan-myeon, Gangneung	47.423 km	
lr 460	Local Route 460	Hwacheon - Yanggu Line Pyeonghwa-ro	화천 ~ 양구선	Daei-ri, Hwacheon-eup, Hwacheon County	Dosa-ri, Yanggu-eup, Yanggu	60.450 km	
lr 461	Local Route 461	Sangseo - Gandong Line	상서 ~ 간동선	Damok-ri, Sangseo-myeon, Hwacheon County	Gancheok-ri, Gandong-myeon, Hwacheon County	54.483 km	
lr 463	Local Route 463	Sanae - Icheon Line	사내 ~ 이천선	Gwangdeok-ri, Saesae-myeon, Hwacheon County	Gadan-ri, Cheorwon-eup, Cheorwon County	53.050 km	
lr 464	Local Route 464	Chuncheon - Cheorwon Line	춘천 ~ 철원선	Jieyeong-ri, Galmal-eup, Cheorwon County	Wolha-ri, Cheorwon-eup, Cheorwon County	22.519 km	
lr 494	Local Route 494	Cheongpyeong - Hoengseong Line	청평 ~ 횡성선	Mogok-ri, Seo-myeon, Hongcheon County	Sangchangbong-ri, Gonggeun-myeon, Hoengseong County	42.556 km	

=== North Gyeongsang Province (900s) ===
- ■(#CCDDCC) is origin or terminus that is not located in North Gyeongsang Province.

Sign	Number	Name	Korean	Origin	Terminus	Length	Note
LR 901	Local Route 901	Jirye ~ Bonghyeon Line	지례 ~ 봉현선	Jirye-myeon, Gimcheon	Bonghyeon-myeon, Yeongju	195.68 km	via Yeongdong County
LR 902	Local Route 902	Cheongdo ~ Gakbuk Line	청도 ~ 각북선	Cheongdo-eup, Cheongdo County	Gakbuk-myeon, Cheongdo County	30.71 km	
LR 903	Local Route 903	Seongju ~ Geumsu Line	청도 ~ 각북선	Gacheon-myeon, Seongju County	Geumsu Gangsan-myeon, Seongju County	91.16 km	
LR 904	Local Route 904	Gogyeong ~ Yangnam Line	고경 ~ 양남선	Gogyeong-myeon, Yeongcheon	Yangnam-myeon, Gyeongju	70.55 km	
LR 905	Local Route 905	Seongsan ~ Wonpyeong Line	성산 ~ 원평선	Seongsan-myeon, Goryeong County	Gumi	66.72 km	
LR 908	Local Route 908	Sinnyeong ~ Juwangsan Line	신녕 ~ 주왕산선	Sinnyeong-myeon, Goryeong County	Juwangsan-myeon, Cheongsong County	66.77 km	
LR 909	Local Route 909	Wachon ~ Gogyeong Line	와촌 ~ 고경선	Wachon-myeon, Gyeongsan	Gogyeong-myeon, Yeongcheon	56.26 km	
LR 910	Local Route 910	Seokpo ~ Wondeok Line	석포 ~ 원덕선	Seokpo-myeon, Bonghwa County	Gagok-myeon, Samcheok	18.92 km	
LR 911	Local Route 911	Jipum ~ Ilwol Line	지품 ~ 일월선	Jipum-myeon, Yeongdeok County	Ilwol-myeon, Yeongyang County	42.46 km	
LR 912	Local Route 912	Cheongri ~ Hyeonseo Line	청리 ~ 현서선	Cheongri-myeon, Sangju	Hyeonseo-myeon, Cheongsong County	102.90 km	
LR 913	Local Route 913	Suryun ~ Nakdong Line	수륜 ~ 낙동선	Suryun-myeon, Seongju County	Nakdong-myeon, Sangju	100.39 km	
LR 914	Local Route 914	Pungcheon ~ Yeongdeok Line	풍천 ~ 영덕선	Pungsan-eup, Andong	Yeongdeok-eup, Yeongdeok County	151.90 km	
LR 915	Local Route 915	Pyeong-eun ~ Chunyang Line	평은 ~ 춘양선	Pyeongeun-myeon, Yeongju	Chunyang-myeon, Bonghwa County	45.95 km	
LR 916	Local Route 916	Apo ~ Pungsan Line	아포 ~ 풍산선	Apo-eup, Gimcheon	Pungsan-eup, Andong	92.10 km	
LR 917	Local Route 917	Seokbo ~ Maehwa Line	석보 ~ 매화선	Seokbo-myeon, Yeongyang County	Maehwa-myeon, Uljin County	166.10 km	
LR 918	Local Route 918	Mulya ~ Yeonghae Line	물야 ~ 영해선	Mulya-myeon, Bonghwa County	Yeonghae-myeon, Yeongdeok County	103.39 km	
LR 919	Local Route 919	Maejeon ~ Sinnyeong Line	매전 ~ 신녕선	Maejeon-myeon, Cheongdo County	Sinnyeong-myeon, Yeongcheon	77.47 km	
LR 920	Local Route 920	Yean ~ Yeongyang Line	예안 ~ 영양선	Yean-myeon, Andong	Yeongyang-eup, Yeongyang County	45.64 km	
LR 921	Local Route 921	Sannae ~ Jukjang Line	산내 ~ 죽장선	Sannae-myeon, Gyeongju	Jukjang-myeon, Pohang	92.91 km	
LR 922	Local Route 922	Gaeun ~ Cheongcheon Line	가은 ~ 청천선	Gaeun-eup, Mungyeong	Gaeun-eup, Mungyeong	17.52 km	
LR 923	Local Route 923	Seonnam ~ Mungyeong Line	선남 ~ 문경선	Jicheon-myeon, Chilgok County	Mungyeong-eup, Mungyeong	160.11 km	Gunwi County section excluded
LR 924	Local Route 924	Mojeon ~ Waryong Line	모전 ~ 와룡선	Mojeon-dong, Mungyeong	Waryong-myeon, Andong	79.8 km	
LR 925	Local Route 925	Maejeon ~ Yeongcheon Line	매전 ~ 영천선	Maejeon-myeon, Cheongdo County	Dodong, Yeongcheon	45.47 km	
LR 927	Local Route 927	Gumi ~ Danyang Line	구미 ~ 단양선	Gao-eup, Gumi	Daegang-myeon, Danyang County	114.24 km	Gunwi County section excluded
LR 928	Local Route 928	Dong-ro ~ Dosan Line	동로 ~ 도산선	Dongro-myeon, Mungyeong	Dosan-myeon, Seongju County	85.59 km	
LR 929	Local Route 929	Gampo ~ Guryongpo Line	감포 ~ 구룡포선	Gampo-eup, Gyeongju	Guryongpo-eup, Pohang	73.83 km	
LR 930	Local Route 930	Geumseong ~ Cheongha Line	금성 ~ 청하선	Geumseong-myeon, Uiseong County	Cheongha-myeon, Pohang	116.38 km	
LR 931	Local Route 931	Gamcheon ~ Mulya Line	감천 ~ 물야선	Gamcheon-myeon, Yecheon County	Mulya-myeon, Bonghwa County	46.86 km	
LR 933	Local Route 933	Waryong ~ Socheon Line	와룡 ~ 소천선	Waryong-myeon, Andong	Socheon-myeon, Bonghwa County	46.28 km	
LR 935	Local Route 935	Gilan ~ Yeongchun Line Imdong ~ Yeongchun Line	길안 ~ 영춘선 임동 ~ 영춘선	Imdong-myeon, Andong	Yeongchun-myeon, Danyang County	126.50 km	
LR 945	Local Route 945	Yangnam ~ Gangdong Line	양남 ~ 강동선	Yangnam-myeon, Gyeongju	Gangdong-myeon, Gyeongju	53.07 km	
LR 997	Local Route 997	Gimcheon ~ Sangju Line	김천 ~ 상주선	Gaeryeong-myeon, Gimcheon	Hwabuk-myeon, Sangju	88.46 km	

=== South Gyeongsang Province (1000s) ===
- ■(#CCDDCC) is origin or terminus that is not located in South Gyeongsang Province.

Sign	Number	Name	Korean	Origin	Terminus	Length	Note
LR 1001	Local Route 1001	Hai–Goje Line	하이 ~ 고제선	Deokho-ri, Hai-myeon, Goseong County	Gaemyeong-ri, Goje-myeon, Geochang County	170.14 km	
LR 1002	Local Route 1002	Geunman–Gusan Line	금남 ~ 구산선	Hadong-eup, Hadong County	Gusan-myeon, Masanhappo-gu, Changwon	148.43 km	
LR 1003	Local Route 1003	Daebang–Akyang Line	대방 ~ 악양선	Dongseo-dong, Sacheon	Pyeongsa-ri, Akyang-myeon, Hadong County	68.9 km	
LR 1004	Local Route 1004	Sabong–Naeseo Line	사봉 ~ 내서선	Muchon-ri, Sabong-myeon, Jinju	Jung-ri, Naeseo-eup, Changwon	37.89 km	
LR 1005	Local Route 1005	Seopo–Danseong Line	서포 ~ 단성선	Bitori, Seopo-myeon, Sacheon	Changchon-ri, Danseong-myeon, Sancheong County	47 km	
LR 1006	Local Route 1006	Myeongseok–Chahwang Line	명석 ~ 차황선	Ussuri, Myeongseok-myeon, Jinju	Singi-ri, Chahwang-myeon, Sancheong County	39.5 km	
LR 1007	Local Route 1007	Maam–Sangbong Line	마암 ~ 상봉선	Hwasan-ri, Maam-myeon, Goseong County	Sangbong-dong, Jinju	68.9 km	
LR 1008	Local Route 1008	Burim–Hanan Line	부림 ~ 하남선	Gyeongsan-ri, Burim-myeon, Uiryeong County	Yangdong-ri, Hanam-eup, Miryang	40.268 km	
LR 1009	Local Route 1009	Georyu–Chojeon Line	거류 ~ 초전선	Sinyong-ri, Georyu-myeon, Goseong County	Chojeon-dong, Jinju	52.7 km	
LR 1010	Local Route 1010	Hai–Donghae Line	거류 ~ 초전선	Deokho-ri, Hai-myeon, Goseong County	Yangchon-ri, Donghae-myeon, Goseong County	77.6 km	
LR 1011	Local Route 1011	Gaya–Daeyang Line Burim–Goryeong Line	가야 ~ 대양선 부림 ~ 고령선	Malsan-ri, Gaya-eup, Haman County	Anlim-ri, Ssangnim-myeon, Goryeong County, North Gyeongsang Province	65.6 km	
LR 1013	Local Route 1013	Chojeon–Garye Line		Chojeon-dong, Jinju	Yangseong-ri, Garye-myeon, Uiryeong County	29.206 km	
LR 1014	Local Route 1014	Hwagae–Sugok Line		Yonggang-ri, Hwagae-myeon, Hadong County	Daecheon-ri, Sugok-myeon, Jinju	39.8 km	
LR 1016	Local Route 1016	Seongu–Yeonghyeon Line		Seongu-dong, Sacheon	Daebeop-ri, Yeonghyeon-myeon, Goseong County	29.6 km	
LR 1018	Local Route 1018	Sadeung–Jangmok Line		Deokho-ri, Sadeung-myeon, Geoje	Yuho-ri, Jangmok-myeon, Geoje	106.8 km	
LR 1020	Local Route 1020	Yongho–Bonghwang Line		Yongho-dong, Seongsan-gu, Changwon	Bonghwang-dong, Gimhae	25.4 km	
LR 1021	Local Route 1021	Misu–Namji Line		Misu-dong, Tongyeong	Gogok-ri, Namji-eup, Changnyeong County	174.664 km	
LR 1022	Local Route 1022	Namji–Gyodong Line		Chilhyeon-ri, Namji-eup, Changnyeong County	Gyo-dong, Yangsan	84.19 km	
LR 1089	Local Route 1089	Shindeung–Buhang Line		Danjang-ri, Sindeung-myeon, Sancheong County	Wolgok-ri, Buhang-myeon, Gimcheon, North Gyeongsang Province	83.7 km	
LR 1099	Local Route 1099	Bansan–Daedeok Line Namsang–Daedeok Line		Jeoncheok-ri, Namsang-myeon, Geochang County	Daedeok-myeon, Gimcheon, North Gyeongsang Province	49.28 km	

=== Jeju Special Self-governing Province (1100s) ===
Sign	Number	Name	Korean	Origin	Terminus	Length	Appointed date	Note
LR 1112	Local Route 1112	Bijarim-ro (Pyeongdae–Bonggae Line)	비자림로 (평대 ~ 봉개선)	Pyeongdae-ri, Gujwa-eup, Jeju City	Bonggae-dong, Jeju City	27.3 km	1960-02-22	
LR 1114	Local Route 1114	Chuja-ro	추자로	Daeseo-ri, Chuja-myeon, Jeju City	Yecho-ri, Chuja-myeon, Jeju City	5.9 km	1965-12-27	
LR 1115	Local Route 1115	2nd Sallok Road (Yongsu–Sanghyo Line)	제2산록도로 (용수 ~ 상효선)	Yongsu-ri, Hangyeong-myeon, Jeju City	Sanghyo-dong, Seogwipo	43.9 km	1981-06-17	
LR 1116	Local Route 1116	Hanchang-ro (Changcheon–Hallim Line)	한창로 (창천 ~ 한림선)	Changcheon-ri, Andeok-myeon, Seogwipo	Hallim-ri, Hallim-eup, Jeju City	14.3 km	1979-04-26	
LR 1117	Local Route 1117	1st Sallok Road (Gwakji–Wolpyeong Line)	제1산록도로 (곽지 ~ 월평선)	Gwakji-ri, Aewol-eup, Jeju City	Wolpyeong-dong, Jeju City	20.8 km	1979-04-26	
LR 1119	Local Route 1119	Seoseong-ro (Seogwipo–Seongsan Line)	서성로 (서귀포 ~ 성산선)	Harye-ri, Namwon-eup, Seogwipo	Seongsan-ri, Seongsan-eup, Seogwipo	33.9 km	1995-10-05	
LR 1120	Local Route 1120	Daehan-ro (Daejeong–Hallim Line)	대한로 (대정 ~ 한림선)	Hamo-ri, Daejeong-eup, Seogwipo	Hallim-ri, Hallim-eup, Jeju City	18.0 km	1995-10-05	
LR 1121	Local Route 1121	Jean-ro (Andeok–Jeju Line)	제안로 (안덕 ~ 제주선)	Daeseo-ri, Andeok-myeon, Seogwipo	Nohyeong-dong, Jeju City	41.7 km	2003-04-07	
LR 1122	Local Route 1122	Jeseong-ro (Jeju–Seongsan Line)	제성로 (제주 ~ 성산선)	Seonheul-ri, Jocheon-eup, Jeju City	Onpyeong-ri, Seongsan-eup, Seogwipo	28.2 km	2003-04-07	
LR 1131	Local Route 1131	5·16 Road (Cheonji–Samdoil Line)	5·16도로 (천지 ~ 삼도일선)	Topyeong-dong, Seogwipo	Ildo 1-dong, Jeju City	40.56 km	2007-01-26	Former National Route 11
LR 1132	Local Route 1132	1st Bypass (Ilju Road)	제1우회도로 (일주도로)	Ildo 1-dong, Jeju City	Ildo 1-dong, Jeju City	176.07 km	2007-01-26	Former National Route 12
LR 1135	Local Route 1135	Pyeonghwa-ro (Boseong–Gwangryeong Line)	평화로 (보성 ~ 광령선)	Boseong-ri, Daejeong-eup, Seogwipo	Gwangryeong-ri, Aewol-eup, Jeju City	29.0 km	2007-01-26	Former National Route 95
LR 1136	Local Route 1136	2nd Bypass (Jungsangan Road)	제2우회도로 (중산간도로)	Ara 2-dong, Jeju City	Ara 2-dong, Jeju City	172.28 km	2007-01-26	Former National Route 16
LR 1139	Local Route 1139	1100 Road (Ora–Jungmun Line)	1100도로 (오라 ~ 중문선)	Jungmun-dong, Seogwipo	Nohyeong-dong, Jeju City	35.1 km	2007-01-26	Former National Route 99

=== Abolished local routes ===
Sign	Route number	Route name	Origin	Terminus	Creation date	Decommissioned date	Notes
lr 303	~~303~~	Seokcheon ~ Sihwa Line	Uijeon-myeon, Hwaseong	Jeongwang-dong, Siheung	30 October 1995	28 March 2005	Cancelled; later became a portion of Local Route 301
lr 307	~~307~~	Pungmu ~ Sau Line	Pumgmu-dong, Gimpo	Sau-dong, Gimpo		28 March 2005	Cancelled
lr 308	~~308~~	Seongnam ~ Jungbu Line	Sujeong-gu, Seongnam	Jungbu-myeon, Gwangju		28 March 2005	Renumbered Local Route 342
lr 312	~~312~~	Pyeongseong ~ Gwacheon Line				28 March 2005	Renumbered Local Route 309
lr 319	~~319~~	Neungseo ~ Cheongun Line			30 October 1995	28 March 2005	Cancelled
lr 320	~~320~~	Jinjeop ~ Daeseong Line			30 October 1995	28 March 2005	Cancelled
lr 324	~~324~~	Papyeong ~ Yeoncheon Line				28 March 2005	Cancelled; now part of Local Route 78
lr 326	~~326~~					February 2009	Became a portion of Local Route 318
lr 328	~~328~~	Munmak ~ Danwol Line				11 January 2008	Became a portion of Local Route 349
lr 335	~~335~~	Angseong ~ Oncheon Line				September 2010	Became a portion of Local Route 531
lr 347	~~347~~	Junae ~ Sinbuk Line				28 March 2005	Cancelled; much of route now Local Route 379
lr 348	~~348~~	Onsu ~ Deokpo Line				7 May 1996	Cancelled when Ganghwa County was incorporated into Incheon
lr 390	~~390~~	Toegyewon ~ Migeum Line				28 March 2005	Former portion of Local route 391; cancelled due to reorganization of local routes in Gyeonggi Province
lr 397	~~397~~	Anyang ~ Oryu Line				18 November 1996	Cancelled
lr 402	~~402~~	Baegun ~ Unhak Line				September 2010	Became a portion of Local Route 597
lr 412	~~412~~	Sabuk ~ Dogye Line				27 February 2009	Upgraded to Local Route 28; some sections became a portion of Local Route 424
lr 413	~~413~~	Mungok ~ Changni Line				11 January 2008	Became a portion of Local Route 415
lr 462	~~462~~	Naemulchi ~ Sokcho Line				1993	Cancelled; now a city road
lr 510	~~510~~	Ochang ~ Salmi Line				7 July 2017	One portion became a portion of Local Route 508; remainder cancelled altogether
lr 515	~~515~~	Cheongcheon ~ Yulmyeon Line				3 September 2010	Became a portion of Local Route 333; now part of Local Routes 533 and 513
lr 520	~~520~~	Gamgok ~ Chungju Line				September 2010	Became a portion of Local Route 525
lr 534	~~534~~	Deoksan ~ Olsan Line				7 July 2017	Cancelled due to changes in local routes
lr 581	~~581~~	Muju ~ Yeongdong Line				7 July 2017	Became a portion of Local Route 505 due to changes in local routes
lr 583	~~583~~	Mugeuk ~ Yongmun Line				September 2010	Became a portion of Local Route 329
lr 587	~~587~~	Deoksan ~ Osan Line				September 2010	Became a portion of Local Route 302
lr 591	~~591~~	Hyeondo ~ Jochiwon Line				September 2010	Became a portion of Local Route 604
lr 594	~~594~~	Dongmyeon ~ Cheongju Line				September 2010	Became a portion of Local Route 512
lr 596	~~596~~	Cheonan ~ Cheongju Line				September 2010	Integrated with Local Route 693; renumbered as a portion of Local Route 696 on 7 July 2017
lr 597	~~597~~	Baegun ~ Yeongwol Line				7 July 2017	Became a portion of Local Route 508
lr 614	~~614~~	Gwangcheon ~ Iin Line				25 August 2001	Became a portion of Local Route 96; section cancelled altogether on 20 February 2003
lr 627	~~627~~	Gongju ~ Jeondong Line				1 July 2012	Cancelled when the route was absorbed into Sejong
lr 731	~~731~~	Jangan ~ Namil Line				1995	Became a portion of Local Route 635
lr 807	~~807~~	Samsan ~ Daeheungsa Line			23 December 1985	8 December 1995	Became a portion of Local Route 806 due to reorganization of local routes in South Jeolla Province; section cancelled altogether in 2003
lr 810	~~810~~	Mokpo ~ Samho Line			23 December 1985	5 January 2007	Became a portion of Local Route 806 due to adjustment of short-section local road routes
lr 814	~~814~~	Seongjeon ~ Byeongyeong Line			14 December 1983	5 January 2007	Became a portion of Local Route 830 due to adjustment of short-section local road routes
lr 816	~~816~~	Yeonggwang ~ Jangseong Line			18 September 1984	5 January 2007	Became a portion of Local Route 734 due to adjustment of short-section local road routes
lr 829	~~829~~	Gundong ~ Seongjeon Line			23 December 1985	5 January 2007	Became a portion of Local Route 827 due to adjustment of short-section local road routes
lr 831	~~831~~	Naju ~ Noan Line			8 July 1983	5 January 2007	Became a portion of Local Route 822 due to adjustment of short-section local road routes
lr 832	~~832~~	Jukhak ~ Seonamsa Line			23 December 1985	8 December 1995	Cancelled due to reorganization of local routes in South Jeolla Province
lr 834	~~834~~	Naksu ~ Songgwangsa Line			23 December 1985	27 March 2003	Became a portion of Local Route 897 due to reorganization of local routes in South Jeolla Province
lr 837	~~837~~	Chilryang ~ Gwansan Line			8 July 1983	5 January 2007	Became a portion of Local Route 827 due to adjustment of short-section local road routes
lr 844	~~844~~	Imja ~ Yeonggwang Line			23 December 1985	27 March 2003	Yeonggwang-eup to Baeksu-eup became a portion of Local Route 805, Baeksu-eup to Yeomsan-myeon became a portion of National Route 77 and Imja-myeon to Jido-eup became a portion of Local Route 825 due to reorganization of local road routes
lr 859	~~859~~	Sora ~ Samil Line			23 December 1985	8 December 1995	Cancelled due to reorganization of local routes in South Jeolla Province
lr 862	~~862~~	Jeomam ~ Hwayang Line	Jeomam-myeon, Goheung-gun	Hwayong-myeon, Yeosu	20 August 1997	27 March 2003	One section upgraded to National Route 77 and remainder upgraded to Local Route 22
lr 869	~~869~~	Mangdeok ~ Seomgeo Line			23 December 1985	8 December 1995	Cancelled due to reorganization of local routes in South Jeolla Province; now Gwangwang City Route 6
lr 892	~~892~~	Jeongeup ~ Sunchang Line			23 December 1985	8 December 1995	Became a portion of Local Route 792 due to reorganization of local routes in South Jeolla Province
lr 906	~~906~~	Maegok ~ Ssangnim Line				3 September 2010	Became a portion of Local Route 514
lr 907	~~907~~	Burim-Goryeong Line				2007	Became a portion of Local Route 1011 due to improvements in the local route numbering system
lr 926	~~926~~	Ulleungdo ring line				17 November 2008	Upgraded to Local Route 90
lr 932	~~932~~	Bunam ~ Namjeong				20 February 2003	Renumbered to Local Route 930
lr 998	~~998~~	Yeongwol ~ Hyeondong Line				1995	Became a portion of Local Route 88
lr 1017	~~1017~~	Macheon ~ Sannae Line				20 February 2003	Cancelled
lr 1019	~~1019~~	Songjeong ~ Deokha Coastal Line				1 July 1996	One section became part of National Route 31 and remainder removed altogether
lr 1025	~~1025~~	Beomseo ~ Duseo Line				1998	Cancelled; now Ulju County Routes 31 and 28
lr 1027	~~1027~~	Seobu ~ Beomseo Line				1998	Cancelled; now Ulsan Metropolitan City roads and Ulju County routes
lr 1045	~~1045~~	Jungdong ~ Bugok Line				20 February 2003	Became a portion of National Route 79
lr 1081	~~1081~~	Habuk ~ Cheongnyang Line				1998	Cancelled
lr 1093	~~1093~~	Jeokpo ~ Hyeonpung Line				1989	Cancelled
lr 1111	~~1111~~						Became a portion of Local Route 1135
lr 1113	~~1113~~	Eastern Industrial Road				19 July 1996	Upgraded to Local Route 97
lr 1118	~~1118~~	Namwon ~ Jocheon Line			5 October 1995	22 June 2021	Upgraded to Local Route 99

== Gallery ==
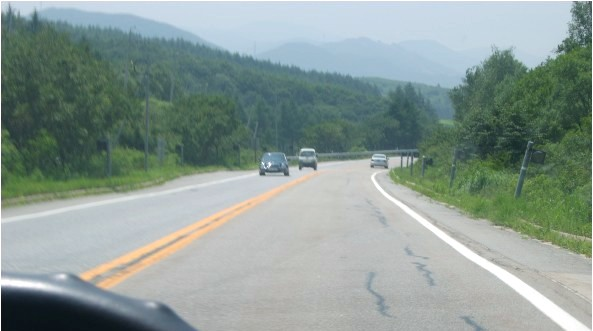
Local route 456

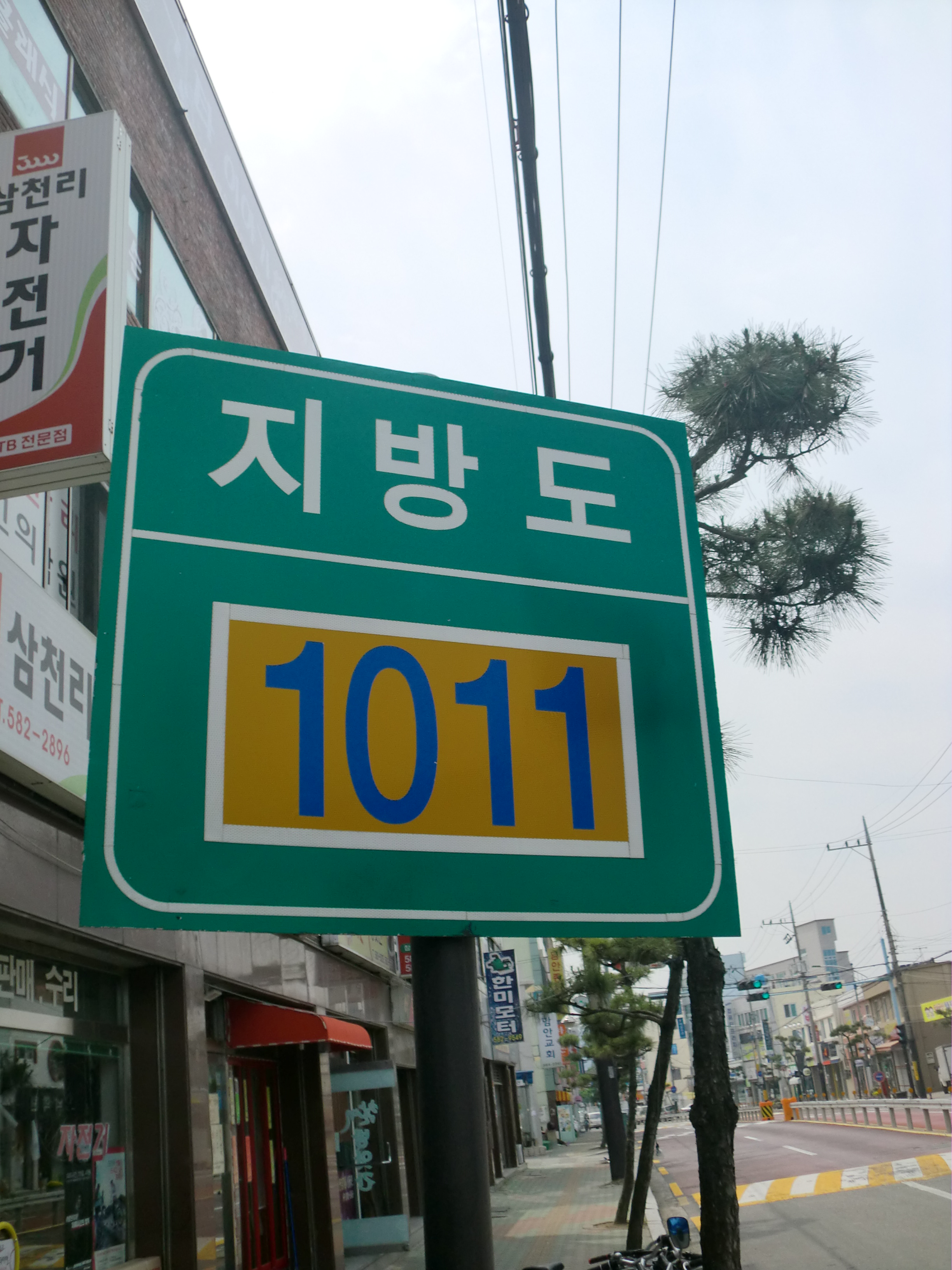
Local route 1011

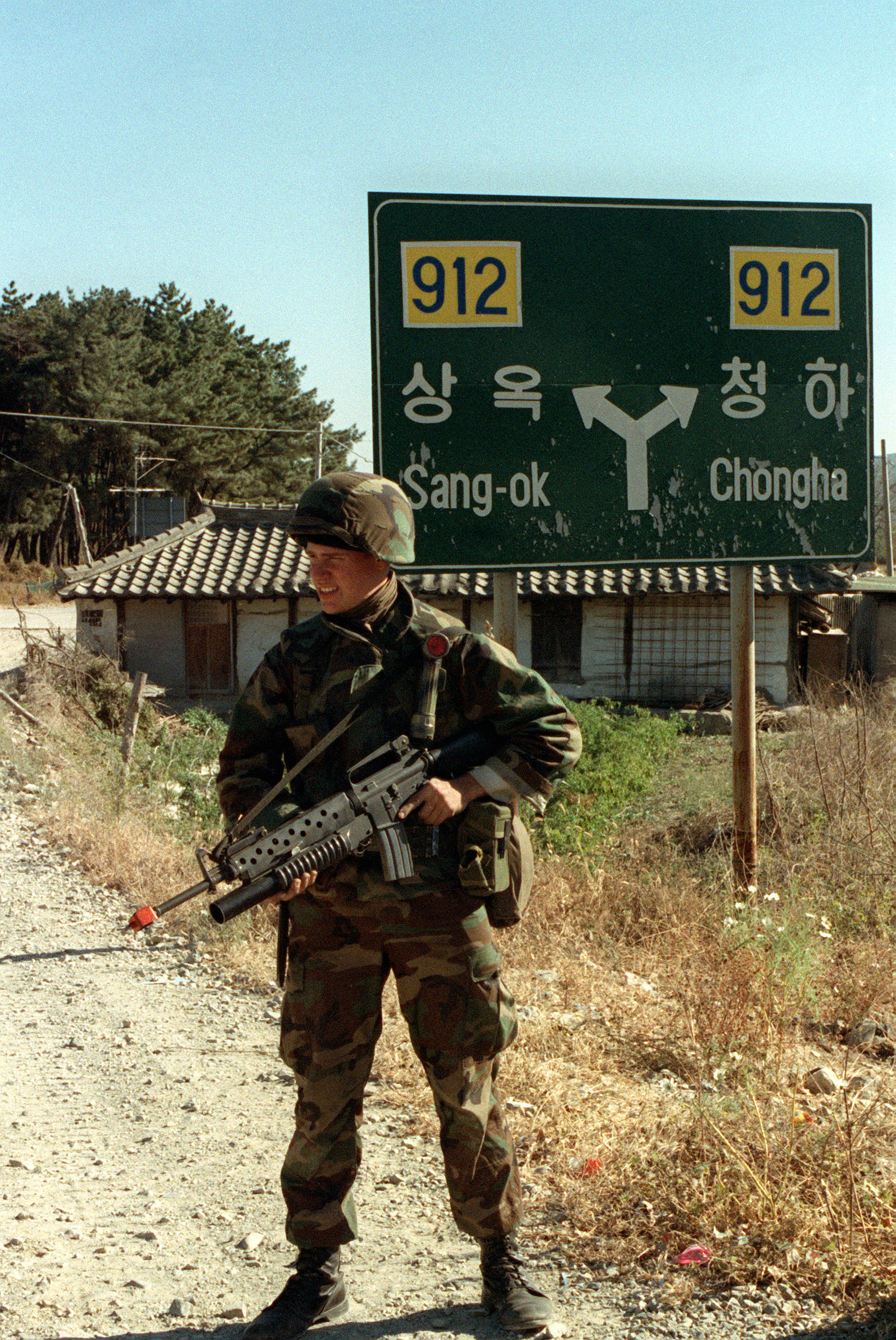
Old Local route 912
(Now Local route 68)

== See also ==
- National highways of South Korea
- Expressways in South Korea
