= Geomdansan =

Geomdansan may refer to:

- Geomdansan (Hanam/Gwangju), a mountain in Gyeonggi Province, South Korea, extending across the cities of Hanam and Gwangju
- Geomdansan (Seongnam/Gwangju), a mountain in Seongnam and Gwangju, Gyeonggi Province, South Korea
