= Gwangju City =

Gwangju City may refer to:

- Gwangju, the capital city of South Jeolla Province, South Korea
  - Gwangju Uprising, 1980
- Gwangju City (Gyeonggi), a city in Gyeonggi Province, South Korea
