= Local Route 1112 (South Korea) =

Road in South Korea

State-Funded Local Highway 1112
- 국가지원지방도 제1112호선
- Bijarim-ro (Pyeongdae–Bonggae Line) 양주 ~ 동두천선

Route information
- Length: 27.3 km (17.0 mi)

Major junctions
- From: Pyeongdae-ri, Gujwa-eup, Jeju City, Jeju Province
- To: Bonggae-dong, Jeju City, Jeju Province

Location
- Country: South Korea

Highway system
- Highway systems of South Korea; Expressways; National; Local

Local Route 1112 Bijarim-ro (Pyeongdae–Bonggae Line) (Korean: 국가지원지방도 제1112호선 비자림로 (평대 ~ 봉개선)) is a local route of South Korea that connects Pyeongdae-ri, Gujwa-eup to Bonggae-dong in Jeju City, Jeju Province. It was nicknamed Bijarim-ro because the area around Pyeongdae-ri, Gujwa-eup is densely populated with zelkova trees.

The local route began in 1967 when the primeval forest was cut down to create an unpaved road for livestock farming. Starting in 1976, some sections of the road were paved, and it began to function as a tourist road. In 1979, it was named the Eastern Livestock Tourism Road and designated as a local route. The name Bijarim-ro was given in 1985.

This route was not developed from an existing road, but rather a new road was created by cutting down a primeval forest, so zelkova trees are spread out like a folding screen on both sides of the road. Because of these characteristics, in 2002, the Ministry of Construction and Transportation (now the Ministry of Land, Infrastructure and Transport) awarded this road the grand prize at the '1st Beautiful Road' contest.

== History ==
Local Route 1112 was first designated on 22 February 1960. On 26 April 1979, as a result of the reorganization of the local route, the terminus was changed from Songdang-ri, Gujwa-myeon, Bukjeju-gun to Bonggae-dong, Jeju-si. Accordingly, the length was increased from 12 km to 27.3 km, and the name was changed from 'Pyeongdae–Songdang Line' to 'Eastern Livestock Tourism Road'. In 1985, the route was given its nickname Bijarim-ro in 1985 and it was made official on 22 February 1990. Local Route 1112 was redesignated on 5 October 1995 and again on 7 April 2003.

== See also ==
- Roads and expressways in South Korea
- Transportation in South Korea
