= Kimchi Bowl =

Final championship game of the Korea American Football Association

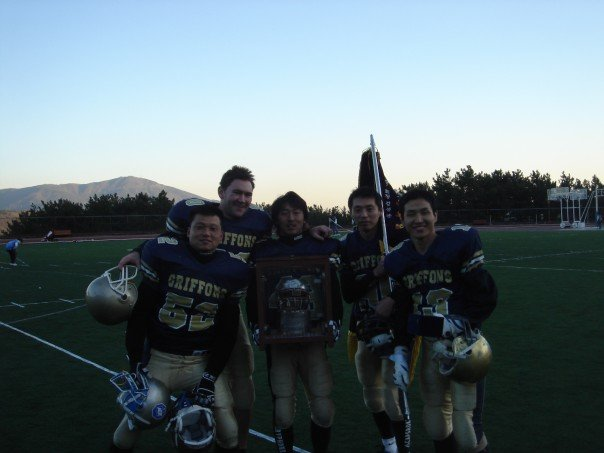
Members of the Samsung Gryphons hold the Kimchi Bowl trophy in 2007 following their victory.

The Kimchi Bowl (Korean: 김치볼) is the final championship game of the Korea American Football Association (KAFA), and was named for kimchi, the national dish of Korea.

The game is considered by players, fans, and organizers to be the Super Bowl of the KAFA. At its conclusion a trophy is awarded to the winning team's coach and passed amongst the players. There is also a game MVP trophy awarded to the game's most valuable player. This honor is decided by the organizers of the game.

The 2007 Kimchi Bowl was won by the Samsung Gryphons.

The 2012 Kimchi Bowl was won by the Seoul Warriors 14–0.

== Game results ==
Game	Date	Winning team		Losing team		Site
Kimchi Bowl 1	January 14, 1996	Dong-a University	12	Seven Six	7	Sagick Stadium • Busan
