= Hwanseongsa =

South Korean Buddhist temple

Hwanseong Temple

Religion
- Affiliation: Buddhism

Location
- Location: Sagi-ri, Hayang-eup, Gyeongsan, Gyeongsangbuk-do
- Country: South Korea
- Interactive map of Hwanseong Temple
- Coordinates: 35.93861°N 128.76694°E

Architecture
- Elevation: 406 m (1,332 ft)

Korean name
- Hangul: 환성사
- Hanja: 環城寺
- RR: Hwanseongsa
- MR: Hwansŏngsa

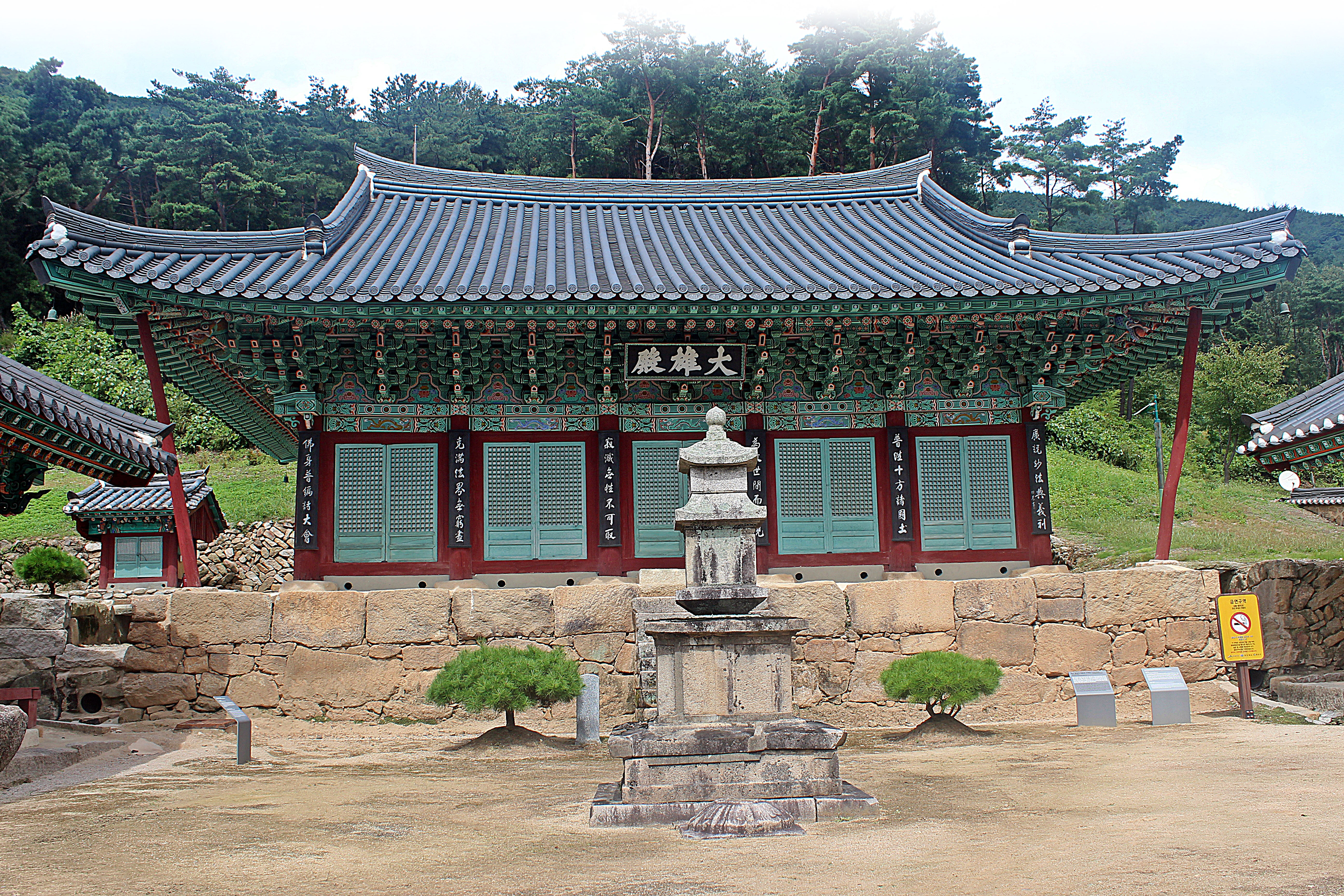
Hwanseongsa Temple's Daeungjeon is located in Hwanseongsa Temple in Hayang-eup, Gyeongsan-si, Gyeongsangbuk-do

Hwanseongsa (Korean: 환성사) is a temple located in Gyeongsan, Gyeongsangbuk-do, South Korea.
