= Dongeui Turtle Fighters football =

South Korean American football team

2017 Dongeui Turtle Fighters football team
- First season: 1982
- Location: Busan, South Korea
- Conference: Korea American Football Association
- Colors: Red and White
- Website: Turtle Fighters

The Dongeui Turtle Fighters football program represents Dong-eui University in college football as members of the Korea American Football Association. Founded in 1982, the Turtle Fighters have won the Korea Collegiate Champions five times. The Turtle Fighters won the Tiger Bowl three times in a row in 2006, 2007, and 2008. Seong-il Baek has been the Turtle Fighters head coach since 2002.
