= Opo Sports Park =

Sports venue

Coordinates: 37°22′15.33″N 127°14′33.02″E

The Opo Sports Park Korean: 오포생활체육공원 is a sports complex in Gwangju, Gyeonggi-do, South Korea. It is located on the bank of Gyeongancheon river, between Opo and Yangbeol bridges. Completed in 2018, the complex consists of an indoor arena, a football stadium and an office building. It replaced the nearby Opo Public Stadium.

== Opo Public Stadium ==
Opo Public Stadium, situated west of the complex's area, was originally a football pitch that hosted the local amateur football games and various events until the Sports Park's completion.

During the construction, the stadium has been simultaneously dismantled and the site now serves as a makeshift car park. The original floodlight towers have survived in place from the former structure.

== See also ==
Gwangju City Public Stadium, Silchon Public Stadium and Toichon Public Stadium are also located in Gwangju, Gyeonggi-do, South Korea.
