= Geomdansan (Seongnam and Gwangju) =

Mountain in Gyeonggi Province, South Korea

Highest point
- Elevation: 534.7 m (1,754 ft)
- Coordinates: 37°27′31″N 127°11′02″E

Geography
- Location: Seongnam & Gwangju, Gyeonggi, South Korea

Korean name
- Hangul: 검단산
- Hanja: 黔丹山
- RR: Geomdansan
- MR: Kŏmdansan

Geomdansan (Korean: 검단산) is a mountain located in Seongnam, and Gwangju, Gyeonggi, South Korea. It has an elevation of 534.7 m (1,754 ft).

== See also ==
- Geography of Korea
- List of mountains in Korea
- List of mountains by elevation
