= Gwangju Public Stadium =

Stadium in Gwangju, South Korea

Coordinates: 37°24′54.71″N 127°15′7.51″E

Gwangju City Public Stadium (Korean: 광주공설운동장) is a multi-purpose stadium in Gwangju, Gyeonggi-do, South Korea. It has currently come to be a popular attraction for Gwangju residents, who attend daily exercise sessions, as well as amateur football games and other activities. The stadium has a capacity of about 4,000 people.

== Other stadia in Gwangju, Gyeonggi-do, South Korea ==
Silchon Public Stadium, Opo Public Stadium and Toichon Public Stadium are also located in Gwangju, Gyeonggi-do, South Korea.
