= Geomdansan (Hanam and Gwangju) =

Mountain in South Korea

Highest point
- Elevation: 657 m (2,156 ft)
- Coordinates: 37°31′16″N 127°14′49″E

Geography
- Location: South Korea

Korean name
- Hangul: 검단산
- Hanja: 黔丹山
- RR: Geomdansan
- MR: Kŏmdansan

Geomdansan (Korean: 검단산) is a mountain in Gyeonggi Province, South Korea. Its area extends across the cities of Hanam and Gwangju. Geomdansan has an elevation of 657 m (2,156 ft).

== See also ==
- List of mountains in Korea
