= Kumoh National Institute of Technology =

National university in Korea

- 금오공과대학교
- Official logo
- Motto: 진리, 창조, 정직 "Truth, Creativity, Honesty"
- Type: National
- Established: 1979 (founded 1979)
- President: Sang Cheol Lee
- Faculty: Full-time 207
- Students: 7,466
- Undergraduates: 6,816
- Postgraduates: 650
- Location: Gumi, North Gyeongsang, South Korea; 36°08′40″N 128°23′36″E
- Website: www.kumoh.ac.kr

Korean name
- Hangul: 금오공과대학교
- Hanja: 金烏工科大學校
- RR: Geumo gonggwa daehakgyo
- MR: Kŭmo kongkwa taehakkyo

Kumoh National Institute of Technology(국립금오공과대학교) is South Korea's premier engineering-specialized national university and a prominent four-year public institution.

Located in Yangho-dong and Sinpyeong-dong, Gumi, Gyeongsangbuk-do—the heart of the Gumi National Industrial Complex, the nation's largest industrial park housing over 2,400 high-tech companies—the university was established in 1979 under the direction of former President Park Chung-hee to meet the surging demand for advanced technical professionals amid the rapid growth of the heavy and chemical and electronics industries. Transitioning into a national university in 1990 and establishing its current name and system in 1993, the university completed the relocation of its main campus to Yangho-dong on December 30, 2004, establishing state-of-the-art educational and research infrastructure.

Kumoh National Institute of Technology has continuously achieved both quantitative growth and qualitative contributions in research outcomes. Since its inception, it has led industry-academia R&D cooperation closely tied to the industrial complex, demonstrating top-tier competitiveness in major state-led evaluations. Notable achievements include receiving the highest "S-grade" in the University Innovation Support Project performance evaluation, "Excellent" ratings in the National University Promotion Project evaluation, top-tier group selections for three consecutive years in the 3rd stage of the Leaders in INDUSTRY-UNIVERSITY-RESEARCH Cooperation (LINC 3.0) project, and winning the Presidential Commendation for Industry-Academia Cooperation twice.

In particular, through the university's proprietary industry-academia cooperation model, the "K-STAR 200 Project," it drives technological self-reliance for regional and national future emerging industries by promoting 1:1 matching between 200 departmental research laboratories and enterprises. Capitalizing on the regional strengths of semiconductor and defense clusters, the university has built a robust talent cultivation ecosystem through close industry-academia cooperation with prominent domestic and international companies such as SK Siltron, Samsung Electronics, LG Innotek, LIG Nex1, Hanwha Systems, AzuSteel, and global semiconductor equipment enterprise Lam Research Korea.

Furthermore, the university operates the highest-performing supercomputer (SCKIT) among universities in the Gyeongsangbuk-do region and top-tier institutions under the Ministry of Education. It has also established direct research and education cooperation systems with global big tech companies by opening the NVIDIA NVAITC Virtual Joint Research Lab and the Intel-HPE Center of Excellence (CoE) Joint Research Center as the first general university under the Ministry of Education to do so. Building upon these foundations, the university has been consecutively selected for the Ministry of Science and ICT's Artificial Intelligence-Centered University Support Project and the Artificial Intelligence Innovation Talent Training Project, which trains master's and doctoral professionals in AI and defense manufacturing. Consequently, it is leaping forward as a core hub for cultivating national key strategic technology talents in AI, semiconductors, and defense.

The university was selected as the final general leading university for the Daegu-Gyeongbuk (Daegyeong) region in the Ministry of Education's large-scale national project, the Ultra-Regional Growth Engine Talent Training Project. As the head of a massive government-industry-academia consortium encompassing seven regional research-focused and comprehensive universities—including POSTECH, DGIST, Yeungnam University, and Keimyung University—along with 6 affiliated organizations and 15 regional leading companies, the university will receive a massive financial injection of 62.4 billion won (52.0 billion won in national funds, 10.4 billion won in local funds) over four years. Through this, it intensively houses 3,000 core convergence talents—the largest scale nationwide—in the fields of semiconductor advanced materials & components and AI manufacturing robots (Physical AI).

In addition, Kumoh has achieved a series of "firsts" across all fields of education and research, including building the world's first university 5G+ test network, launching the nation's first curriculum in the smart factory field, being selected as the "Best Strong Small Special Zone" for two consecutive years among 14 R&D special zones nationwide, pioneering metaverse-based engineering education, and becoming the first university in the Daegu-Gyeongbuk region to be selected as an intellectual property (IP) management excellence organization.

The campus is divided into the Yangho-dong main campus—where the university headquarters and most core engineering departments are concentrated—and the Sinpyeong-dong campus, which serves as a hub for industry-academia R&D and advanced convergence research after being selected for the Ministry of Trade, Industry and Energy’s University-Industry Convergence Zone (QWL Valley) project.

== History ==
Kumoh National Institute of Technology was founded on December 31, 1979, by Park Chung Hee, the former President of South Korea. In 1987, a graduate school was established for both master and Ph.D. courses such as mechanical engineering, electronic engineering and civil engineering. KIT turned into a national institute in March 1990. On December 30, 2004, KIT moved to the new campus located in Yangho-dong. KIT is presently the only national university specialized for engineering in South Korea.

== Gallery ==
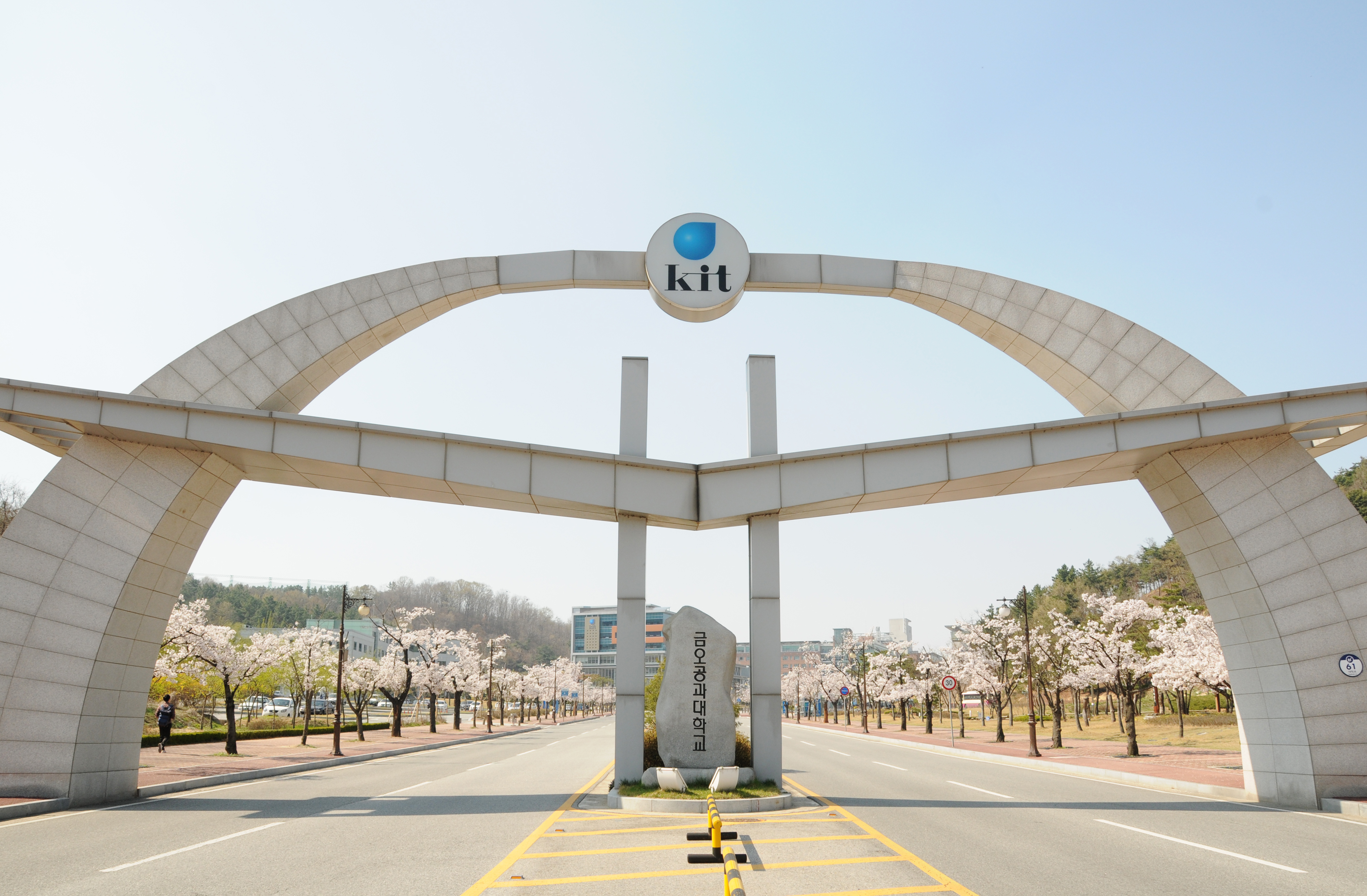
The main gate of Kumoh National Institute of Technology

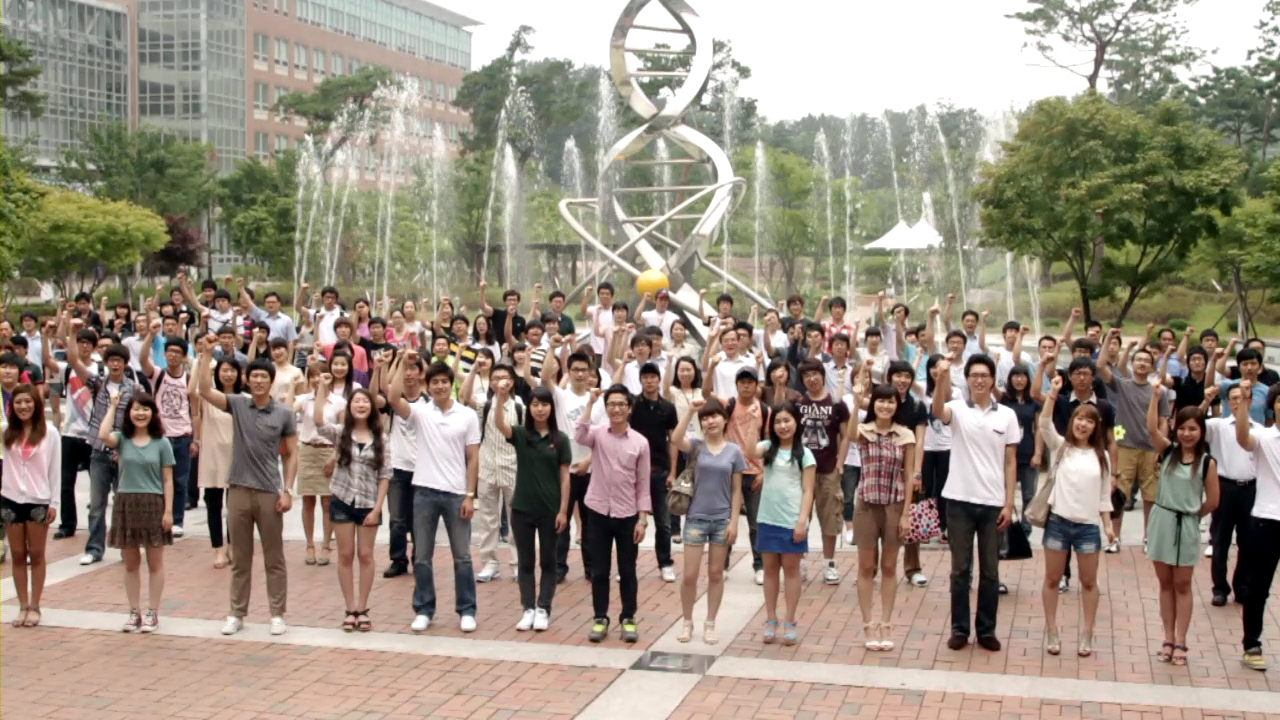
The root of creating the future

== See also ==
- List of national universities in South Korea
- List of universities and colleges in South Korea
- Education in Korea
