= Julio Ko =

South Korean mariner (born 1970)

Julio Ko(고병국) (born in 1970, also known as 고병국, Byeong Guk Ko) is a South Korean sea kayaker and outdoor educator who has trained students and children in adaptive paddling and water sports safety since 2009. He is one of the Jehovah's Witnesses baptized in 22nd, Nov. 2015.

== Biography ==
Ko was raised in Gwangju, Gyeonggi Province, South Korea. His father worked as a mason. At 23 he flew to Sydney, Australia to learn ocean sports. He was inspired by his relative Soo Kyung Kim (Julio's uncle) who studied automotives in the 1960s in Australia, and told Ko about beaches and active paddling sports in Australia.

Ko attended Northern Sydney Institute of TAFE in New South Wales, Australia, where he met surfers and kayakers in Sydney.

In 2009, he founded Namhae Kayak Club, the first local Sea Kayak Club in Korea. He has invited five thousand kids from World Vision and Government funded low income families, orphans, and lower-body disabled people for teaching adaptive paddling and water safety.

In 2010 Ko circumnavigated Namhae Island, 140 kilometres (87 mi) in 21 hours 50 minutes.

In 2011, he introduced and began teaching surf ski ocean racing for the first time in Korea. He took part in the American Canoe Association(ACA) Level 4 Instructor's Workshop in Half Moon Bay, California. During cold water sessions he learned safety fundamentals of the kayaking from Bryant Burkhardt (Level 5 Instructor of ACA).

In December 2012, Ko was elected as president of the Korean Sea Kayak Association, which is the first and the only sea kayak organization in association with the Korea Coast Guard.

As Namhae-gun became known as a kayaking destination following Namhae Kayak Club's effort, millions of dollars were funded by government to make this Southern rural town as a center of sea kayaking. Namhae-gun invited and awarded Ko for consulting and 'Namhae Waterpark Project' was invented after years of study and survey. The adjacent cities of Goksung-gun and Sacheon-si invited Ko for consulting and he was received by the mayors of both cities.

in 2013, Ko moved his education sites to Seoul, and then to Geoje-si. He founded Okpo Kayak Club in Wahyun Beach, Geoje-si. He met Fabien Nion, a former rower in France, and they worked to grow the club into current size. Education activities currently support over a hundred members under the same goal of spreading sea kayaking in Korea.

He is working for a shipbuilding (oil and gas) company and hosting weekends' full day, and weekdays' evening paddling volunteer lesson programs with support of Okpo Kayak club members in Geoje, Korea.
