= Duryu Park Stadium =

South Korean sports stadium

Coordinates: 35°50′59.89″N 128°33′49.78″E

Duryu Park Stadium is a stadium in South Korea.

== See also ==
- Sports in South Korea
- List of sports venues in South Korea
