= Toechon-myeon =

Town in the Republic of Korea

- Hangul: 퇴촌면
- Hanja: 退村面
- RR: Toechon-myeon
- MR: T'oech'on-myŏn

Toechon-myeon (Korean: 퇴촌면) or Toechon-myon or Toichon-myeon is a township (myeon) in the city of Gwangju in the Gyeonggi Province in South Korea.

== Stadium ==
Toechon Public Stadium is a multi-purpose stadium in Gwangju, Gyeonggi-do, South Korea. It is currently used mostly for amateur football matches and other activities.

Other stadia in Gwangju, Gyeonggi-do, South Korea include Gwangju City Public Stadium, Opo Public Stadium and Silchon Public Stadium, which are also located in Gwangju, Gyeonggi-do, South Korea.
