= Daegu Haany University =

South Korean university

Daegu Hanny University
- 대구한의대학교
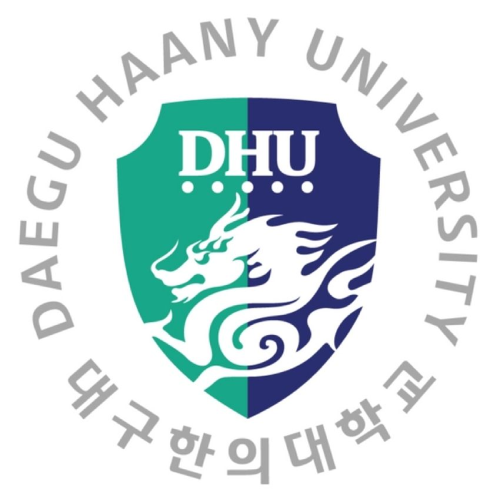
- Motto in English: "Specialized education for cultivating talented professionals with practical competence"
- Type: Private
- Established: 1980
- President: Byeon Chang Hoon
- Academic staff: 468
- Students: 7,134
- Undergraduates: 6,896
- Postgraduates: 134
- Doctoral students: 97
- Location: Daegu and Gyeongsan, South Korea; 35°47′42.0″N 128°46′31.7″E
- Mascot: The Dragon
- Website: www.dhu.ac.kr

Korean name
- Hangul: 대구한의대학교
- Hanja: 大邱韓醫大學校
- RR: Daegu hanui daehakgyo
- MR: Taegu hanŭi taehakkyo

Daegu Haany University is a South Korean university specialized in providing training for practitioners of Oriental medicine. The main campus is located a short distance outside Daegu in Gyeongsan City, North Gyeongsang province. Another campus, along with the university hospital, operates within Daegu. The current president is Chang-Hoon Byeon.

== History ==
The university opened its doors as a college in 1981. The affiliated hospital was opened in 1983. The college gained university status in 1992 and took on the name "Kyungsan University" (경산대학교). In 2003 the current name was adopted.

== Academics ==
Although continuing the university's traditional focus on Traditional Korean Medicine, the current academic offerings cover a wide range of fields, such as child welfare, tourism, and police administration. The undergraduate courses are offered through the university's five colleges: Traditional Korean Medicine, Health and Welfare, Cultural Sciences, Business and Information, and Architecture and Design.

== Sister schools ==
Daegu Haany University maintains international exchange relationships with institutions in six countries: the United States (Cal Poly, Fairleigh Dickinson University, Eastern Kentucky University, University of Georgia), Thailand (Phon Commercial and Technical College), Kazakhstan (Al-Farabi University), Taiwan (China Medical University), China (Beijing University of Chinese Medicine, Hebei Chinese Medical School, Tianjin Chinese Medical School, Yonyung Chinese Medical School), and Australia (Macquarie University).

== See also ==
- List of universities and colleges in South Korea
- Education in Korea
