= Gyeongsan =

City in North Gyeongsang, South Korea

Coordinates: 35°49′N 128°44′E

- Municipal City
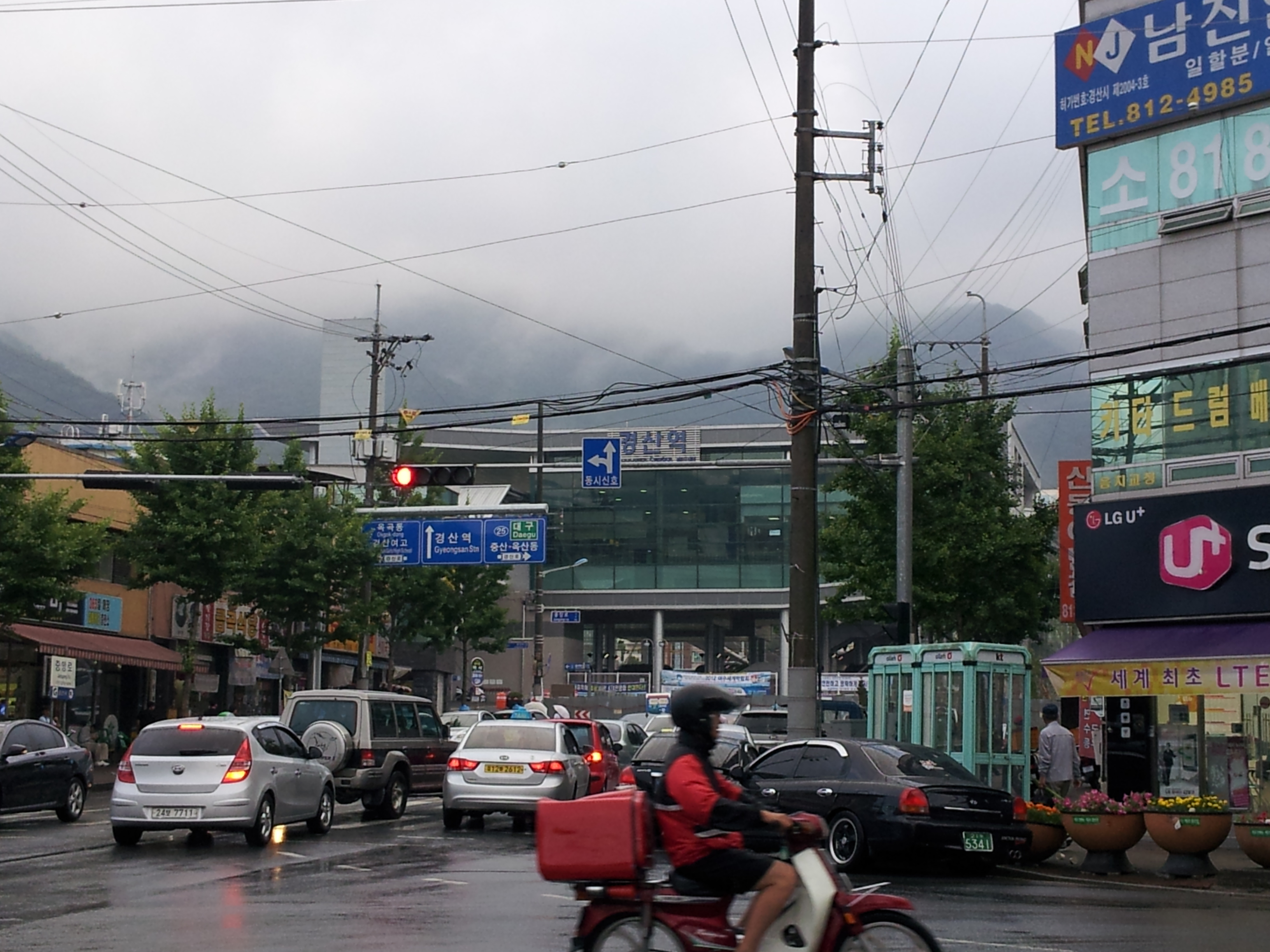

- Flag Emblem of Gyeongsan

- Location in South Korea
- Country: South Korea
- Region: Yeongnam
- Administrative divisions: 2 eup, 6 myeon, 6 dong

Area
  - Total: 411.58 km^{2} (158.91 sq mi)

Population (September 2024)
  - Total: 266,951
  - Density: 574.52/km^{2} (1,488.0/sq mi)
  - Dialect: Gyeongsang
- Area code: +82-53-8xx

Korean name
- Hangul: 경산시
- Hanja: 慶山市
- RR: Gyeongsan-si
- MR: Kyŏngsan-si

Gyeongsan (Korean: 경산; Korean pronunciation: [kjʌŋ.san]) is a satellite city in North Gyeongsang Province, South Korea. Its western border abuts the metropolitan city of Daegu, and much of Gyeongsan lies within the Daegu metropolitan area.

Numerous universities are located in Gyeongsan, such as Yeungnam University, Daegu University, Daekyeung University, Catholic University of Daegu, Daegu Haany University and Gyeongil University.

Gyeongsan was the host for the 38th International Chemistry Olympiad (2 July 2006 – 11 July 2006).

== City symbols ==
The city flower is the magnolia, which grows well in poor soil conditions. The city bird is the magpie. The city tree is the ginkgo.

== Twin towns – sister cities ==
Gyeongsan is twinned with:

- Gangdong (Seoul), South Korea
- Jōyō, Japan
- Sinan, South Korea
- Xihai'an, China

== Administrative districts ==
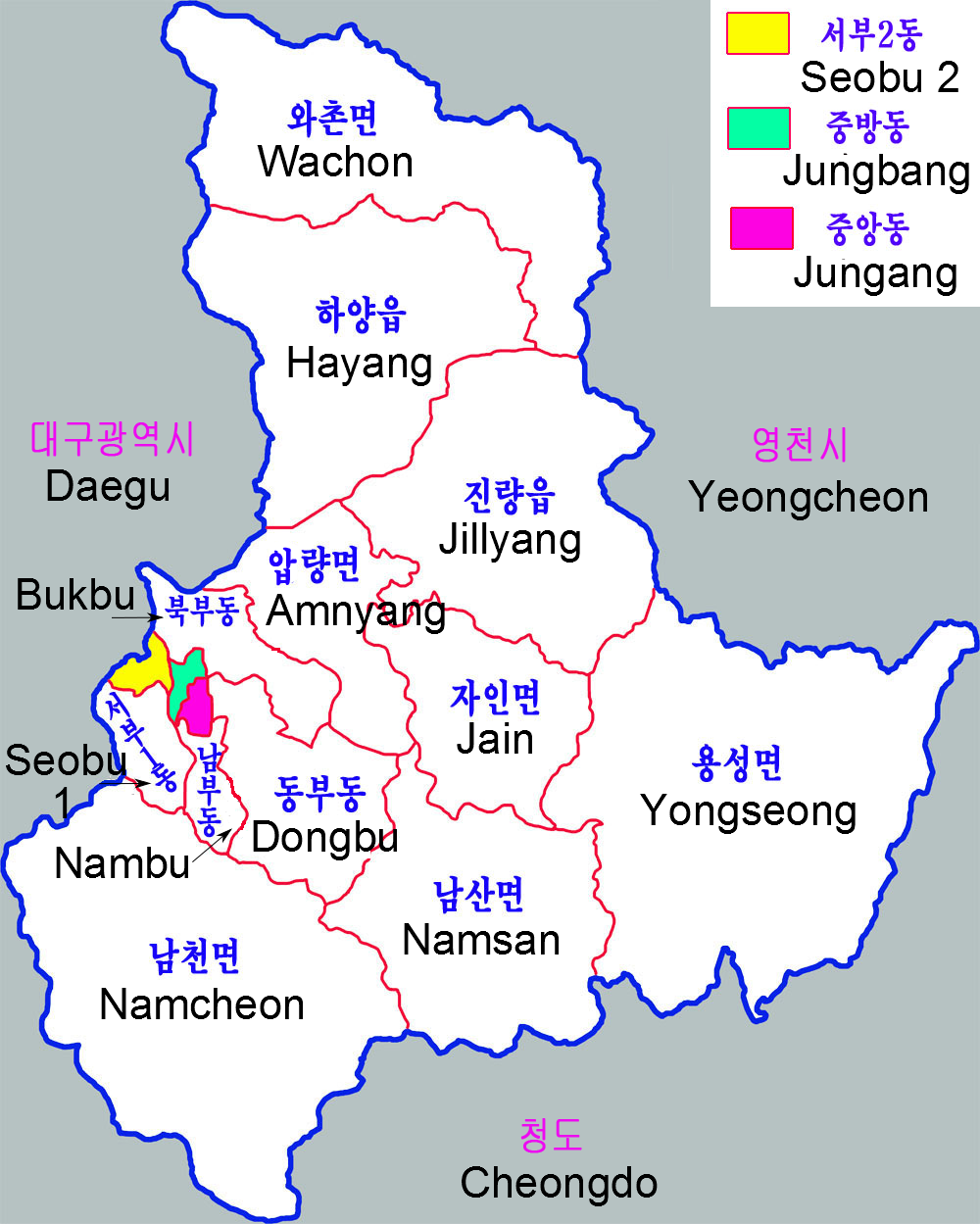
Map of Gyeongsan eup, myeon and dong

Gyeongsan is divided into 3 eup, 5 myeon and 7 dong. Amnyang was promoted to eup status on 1 January 2020.

Name	Hangeul	Hanja
Hayang-eup	하양읍	河陽邑
Jillyang-eup	진량읍	珍良邑
Amnyang-eup	압량읍	押梁邑
Wachon-myeon	와촌면	瓦村面
Jain-myeon	자인면	慈仁面
Yongseong-myeon	용성면	龍城面
Namsan-myeon	남산면	南山面
Namcheon-myeon	남천면	南川面
Jungang-dong	중앙동	中央洞
Dongbu-dong	동부동	東部洞
Seobu 1-dong	서부1동	西部一洞
Seobu 2-dong	서부2동	西部二洞
Nambu-dong	남부동	南部洞
Bukbu-dong	북부동	北部洞
Jungbang-dong	중방동	中方洞

== Climate ==
The climate is mild because of its southern location. However, being landlocked makes its climate continental.

The amount of rainfall is less than the average yearly rainfall of Korea, due to its geographical characteristics.

== Religion ==
- Hwanseongsa, temple

== See also ==
- List of cities in South Korea
