= Gwangju, Gyeonggi =

City in Gyeonggi, South Korea

Coordinates: 37°22′N 127°17′E

Gwangju
- Municipal City
- Panoramic view of Gwangju

- Flag Emblem of Gwangju

- Location in South Korea
- Country: South Korea
- Region: Gyeonggi Province (Sudogwon)
- Administrative divisions: 2 eup, 10 dong, 4 myeon

Government
  - mayor: Park Gwan-yeol (박관열)

Area
  - Total: 430.99 km^{2} (166.41 sq mi)

Population (September 2024)
  - Total: 396,055
  - Density: 918.94/km^{2} (2,380.0/sq mi)
  - Dialect: Seoul

Korean name
- Hangul: 광주시
- Hanja: 廣州市
- RR: Gwangju-si
- MR: Kwangju-si

Gwangju (Note: In the 19th century, Gwangju was sometimes spelled Koang-tsiou.) (Korean: 광주; pronounced [kwaŋ.dʑu]) is a city in Gyeonggi Province, South Korea, a suburb southeast of Seoul.

== History ==
Bunwon-ri in Gwangju took an important role of ceramic production during the Kingdom of Joseon. There had official kilns and produced superb quality of white porcelains for use at the royal court and to export to China.

In 1962, 4 myeons (townships) including 5 ris (villages) were incorporated to Seoul.

In 1973, 6 ris were separated and became a part of Seongnam city. In 1979, Gwangju-myeon was elevated to an eup. Gwangju County became a city in 2001.

== Festival ==
Gwangju Toechon Tomato Festival - Gwangju City, Gyeonggi Province has been holding a festival since 2003 to promote the city's pollution-free tomatoes and sell them to consumers.

== Traditional markets ==
- Gyeongan Market

== Climate ==
Gwangju has a monsoon-influenced humid continental climate (Köppen: Dwa) with cold, dry winters and hot, rainy summers.

Climate data for Gwangju, Gyeonggi (1993–2020 normals)
Month	Jan	Feb	Mar	Apr	May	Jun	Jul	Aug	Sep	Oct	Nov	Dec	Year
Mean daily maximum °C (°F)	2.2 (36.0)	5.4 (41.7)	11.7 (53.1)	18.6 (65.5)	23.9 (75.0)	27.8 (82.0)	29.2 (84.6)	30.2 (86.4)	26.0 (78.8)	20.0 (68.0)	11.9 (53.4)	3.9 (39.0)	17.6 (63.7)
Daily mean °C (°F)	−3.3 (26.1)	−0.4 (31.3)	5.3 (41.5)	11.8 (53.2)	17.2 (63.0)	21.8 (71.2)	24.7 (76.5)	25.2 (77.4)	20.2 (68.4)	13.3 (55.9)	6.1 (43.0)	−1.4 (29.5)	11.7 (53.1)
Mean daily minimum °C (°F)	−8.2 (17.2)	−5.7 (21.7)	−0.5 (31.1)	5.5 (41.9)	11.2 (52.2)	16.8 (62.2)	21.2 (70.2)	21.6 (70.9)	16.0 (60.8)	8.2 (46.8)	1.0 (33.8)	−6.1 (21.0)	6.8 (44.2)
Average precipitation mm (inches)	16.6 (0.65)	25.0 (0.98)	35.5 (1.40)	67.5 (2.66)	91.4 (3.60)	118.1 (4.65)	374.4 (14.74)	317.6 (12.50)	140.5 (5.53)	55.9 (2.20)	45.8 (1.80)	19.8 (0.78)	1,308.1 (51.50)
Average precipitation days (≥ 0.1 mm)	3.4	3.5	5.3	6.8	6.6	7.6	12.9	13.0	7.5	5.2	6.8	4.8	83.4
Source: Korea Meteorological Administration

== Notable people ==
- Ahn Sun-ju (1987), professional golfer
- Choi Soo-young (1990), singer and actress, member of Girls' Generation.
- Lee Hong-gi (1990), singer and actor
- Lee Hye-ri (1994), singer and actress
- Julio Ko (1970), kayaker and educator
- Yoon Shi-yoon (1986), actor and variety entertainer
- Lee Ju-yeon (1998), member of boy group The Boyz

== International relations ==
=== Sister cities ===
- Zibo, Shandong, China

=== Friendship cities ===
- Faku County, Liaoning, China
- Dornogovi Province, Mongolia
- Bathurst, New South Wales, Australia

== See also ==
- Joseon white porcelain
- Korean pottery and porcelain
- List of cities in South Korea
- Geography of South Korea
